= Football at the 2014 Asian Games – Women's team squads =

Below are the squads for the women's football tournament at the 2014 Asian Games, played in South Korea.

== Group A ==
=== India ===
Coach: Tarun Roy

No.	Pos.	Player	Date of birth (age)	Club
1	GK	Aditi Chauhan	20 November 1992 (aged 21)	
2	DF	Gurumayum Radharani Devi	1 March 1991 (aged 23)	
3	DF	Ashem Romi Devi	10 February 1989 (aged 25)	
4	DF	Loitongbam Ashalata Devi	3 July 1993 (aged 21)	
5	DF	Suprava Samal	16 June 1990 (aged 24)	
6	MF	Oinam Bembem Devi	1 March 1980 (aged 34)	(Football Association of Maldives) New Radiant
7	MF	Yumlembam Premi Devi	6 December 1993 (aged 20)	
8	MF	Moirangthem Mandakini Devi	1 March 1991 (aged 23)	
9	FW	Kamala Devi	4 March 1992 (aged 22)	
10	FW	Ngangom Bala Devi	2 February 1990 (aged 24)	(Football Association of Maldives) New Radiant
11	MF	Sasmita Malik	10 April 1989 (aged 25)	
12	FW	Grace Dangmei	5 February 1996 (aged 18)	
13	GK	Pushpa Tirkey	16 March 1996 (aged 18)	
14	MF	Amoolya Kamal	11 July 1984 (aged 30)	
15	GK	Okram Roshini Devi	8 February 1994 (aged 20)	
16	FW	Irom Prameshwori Devi	1 May 1989 (aged 25)	
17	DF	Tuli Goon	21 February 1988 (aged 26)	
18	DF	Thokchom Umapati Devi	10 March 1994 (aged 20)	

=== Maldives ===
Coach: Ibrahim Haleem

No.	Pos.	Player	Date of birth (age)	Club
1	GK	Aminath Leeza	25 November 1986 (aged 27)	(Football Association of Maldives) MNDF
2	DF	Farah Ahmed	25 December 1992 (aged 21)	(Football Association of Maldives) Sun Hotels and Resorts
3	DF	Sheeneez Mohamed	25 November 1985 (aged 28)	(Football Association of Maldives) Sun Hotels and Resorts
4	DF	Shaufa Mahmood	2 March 1988 (aged 26)	(Football Association of Maldives) Sun Hotels and Resorts
5	DF	Sanfa Ibrahim Didi	27 April 1985 (aged 29)	(Football Association of Maldives) Police Club
6	DF	Shiyana Ahmed Zuhair	1 January 1988 (aged 26)	(Football Association of Maldives) New Radiant
7	MF	Fadhuwa Zahir	7 May 1986 (aged 28)	(Football Association of Maldives) New Radiant
8	FW	Mariyam Rifa	29 August 1992 (aged 22)	(Football Association of Maldives) MNDF
9	DF	Aishath Maeesa	16 July 1992 (aged 22)	(Football Association of Maldives) MNDF
10	DF	Fathimath Afza	1 November 1988 (aged 25)	(Football Association of Maldives) MNDF
11	FW	Aishath Samaa	26 March 1994 (aged 20)	(Football Association of Maldives) New Radiant
12	DF	Areesha Riza	30 March 1985 (aged 29)	(Football Association of Maldives) Sun Hotels and Resorts
13	DF	Aminath Azeema	19 October 1984 (aged 29)	(Football Association of Maldives) MNDF
14	DF	Mariyam Mirfath	16 May 1985 (aged 29)	(Football Association of Maldives) MNDF
15	DF	Aminath Zaahiya	11 July 1993 (aged 21)	(Football Association of Maldives) MNDF
16	MF	Sithana Ali	18 March 1987 (aged 27)	(Football Association of Maldives) New Radiant
17	MF	Hawwa Haneefa	31 January 1990 (aged 24)	(Football Association of Maldives) New Radiant
18	GK	Lubna Hussain Maniku	15 March 1987 (aged 27)	(Football Association of Maldives) Sun Hotels and Resorts

=== South Korea ===
Coach: Yoon Deok-yeo

No.	Pos.	Player	Date of birth (age)	Club
1	GK	Jun Min-kyung	16 January 1985 (aged 29)	(Korea Football Association) Goyang Daekyo
2	DF	Song Su-ran	7 September 1990 (aged 24)	(Korea Football Association) Daejeon Sportstoto
3	DF	Kim Hye-ri	25 June 1990 (aged 24)	(Korea Football Association) Hyundai Steel Red Angels
4	DF	Shim Seo-yeon	15 April 1989 (aged 25)	(Korea Football Association) Goyang Daekyo
5	DF	Kim Do-yeon	7 December 1988 (aged 25)	(Korea Football Association) Hyundai Steel Red Angels
6	DF	Lim Seon-joo	27 November 1990 (aged 23)	(Korea Football Association) Hyundai Steel Red Angels
7	MF	Jeon Ga-eul	14 September 1988 (aged 26)	(Korea Football Association) Hyundai Steel Red Angels
8	MF	Cho So-hyun	24 June 1988 (aged 26)	(Korea Football Association) Hyundai Steel Red Angels
9	FW	Jung Seol-bin	6 January 1990 (aged 24)	(Korea Football Association) Hyundai Steel Red Angels
10	FW	Ji So-yun	21 February 1991 (aged 23)	(The Football Association) Chelsea
11	MF	Park Hee-young	21 March 1991 (aged 23)	(Korea Football Association) Daejeon Sportstoto
12	FW	Yoo Young-a	15 April 1988 (aged 26)	(Korea Football Association) Hyundai Steel Red Angels
13	MF	Kwon Hah-nul	7 March 1988 (aged 26)	(Korea Football Association) Busan Sangmu
14	MF	Lee So-dam	12 October 1994 (aged 19)	(Korea Football Association) Ulsan College
15	MF	Choe Yu-ri	16 September 1994 (aged 20)	(Korea Football Association) Ulsan College
16	MF	Lee Young-ju	22 April 1992 (aged 22)	(Korea Football Association) Busan Sangmu
17	DF	Shin Dam-yeong	2 October 1993 (aged 20)	(Korea Football Association) Suwon FMC
18	GK	Kim Jung-mi	16 October 1984 (aged 29)	(Korea Football Association) Hyundai Steel Red Angels

=== Thailand ===
Coach: Nuengrutai Srathongvian

No.	Pos.	Player	Date of birth (age)	Club
1	GK	Waraporn Boonsing	16 February 1990 (aged 24)	(Football Association of Thailand) BG Bundit Asia
2	DF	Darut Changplook	3 February 1988 (aged 26)	(Football Association of Thailand) North Bangkok University
3	DF	Natthakarn Chinwong	15 March 1992 (aged 22)	(Football Association of Thailand) Khon Kaen Sports School
4	DF	Duangnapa Sritala	4 February 1986 (aged 28)	(Football Association of Thailand) Bangkok
5	DF	Supaporn Gaewbaen	4 March 1985 (aged 29)	(Football Association of Thailand) BG Bundit Asia
6	MF	Pikul Khueanpet	20 September 1988 (aged 25)	(Football Association of Thailand) BG Bundit Asia
7	MF	Silawan Intamee	22 January 1994 (aged 20)	(Football Association of Thailand) Chonburi Sriprathum
8	MF	Naphat Seesraum	11 May 1987 (aged 27)	(Football Association of Thailand) BG Bundit Asia
9	DF	Warunee Phetwiset	13 December 1990 (aged 23)	(Football Association of Thailand) Chonburi Sriprathum
10	DF	Sunisa Srangthaisong	6 May 1988 (aged 26)	(Football Association of Thailand) BG Bundit Asia
11	FW	Kanjana Sungngoen	21 September 1986 (aged 27)	(Football Association of Thailand) Bangkok
12	MF	Wilaiporn Boothduang	25 June 1987 (aged 27)	(Football Association of Thailand) Bangkok
13	MF	Orathai Srimanee	12 June 1988 (aged 26)	(Football Association of Thailand) BG Bundit Asia
14	FW	Pitsamai Sornsai	19 January 1989 (aged 25)	(Football Association of Thailand) Chonburi Sriprathum
15	FW	Nisa Romyen	18 January 1990 (aged 24)	(Football Association of Thailand) North Bangkok University
16	MF	Rattikan Thongsombut	7 July 1991 (aged 23)	(Football Association of Thailand) BG Bundit Asia
17	MF	Anootsara Maijarern	14 February 1986 (aged 28)	(Football Association of Thailand) Royal Thai Air Force
18	GK	Yada Sengyong	10 September 1993 (aged 21)	(Football Association of Thailand) North Bangkok University

== Group B ==
=== China ===
Coach: Hao Wei

No.	Pos.	Player	Date of birth (age)	Club
1	GK	Zhang Yue	30 September 1990 (aged 23)	(Chinese Football Association) Beijing Zhaotai
2	DF	Liu Shanshan	16 March 1992 (aged 22)	(Chinese Football Association) Hebei Yuandong
3	DF	Wang Shanshan	27 January 1990 (aged 24)	(Chinese Football Association) Tianjin Huisen
4	DF	Li Jiayue	8 June 1990 (aged 24)	(Chinese Football Association) Shanghai STV
5	DF	Wu Haiyan	26 February 1993 (aged 21)	(Korea Football Association) Daejeon Sportstoto
6	DF	Li Dongna	6 December 1988 (aged 25)	(Chinese Football Association) Tianjin Huisen
7	MF	Xu Yanlu	16 September 1991 (aged 23)	(Chinese Football Association) Jiangsu Huatai
8	MF	Ren Guixin	19 December 1988 (aged 25)	(Chinese Football Association) Changchun Zhuoyue
9	FW	Ma Jun	6 March 1989 (aged 25)	(Korea Football Association) Suwon FMC
10	FW	Li Ying	7 January 1993 (aged 21)	(Korea Football Association) Suwon FMC
11	FW	Yang Li	31 January 1991 (aged 23)	(Chinese Football Association) Jiangsu Huatai
12	GK	Wang Fei	22 March 1990 (aged 24)	(Chinese Football Association) Dalian Aerbin
13	MF	Wang Lisi	28 November 1991 (aged 22)	(Chinese Football Association) Jiangsu Huatai
14	MF	Gu Yasha	28 November 1990 (aged 23)	(Chinese Football Association) Beijing Zhaotai
15	MF	Zhang Rui	17 January 1989 (aged 25)	(Chinese Football Association) Bayi
16	MF	Wang Chen	24 October 1989 (aged 24)	(Chinese Football Association) Beijing Zhaotai
17	DF	Wang Lingling	18 June 1988 (aged 26)	(Chinese Football Association) Beijing Zhaotai
18	MF	Han Peng	20 December 1989 (aged 24)	(Chinese Football Association) Tianjin Huisen

=== Chinese Taipei ===
Coach: (Japan) Masayuki Nagira

No.	Pos.	Player	Date of birth (age)	Club
1	GK	Tsai Ming-jung	23 January 1989 (aged 25)	(Chinese Taipei Football Association) Hsinchu
2	DF	Chen Ying-hui	1 July 1988 (aged 26)	(Chinese Taipei Football Association) Taichung Blue Whale
3	DF	Lin Man-ting	10 July 1990 (aged 24)	(Chinese Taipei Football Association) Taichung Blue Whale
4	DF	Lin Kai-ling	21 September 1991 (aged 22)	(Chinese Taipei Football Association) Hualien Taikai
5	DF	Lin Chiung-ying	2 November 1987 (aged 26)	(Chinese Taipei Football Association) Taichung Blue Whale
6	DF	Lin Ya-han	15 December 1990 (aged 23)	(Chinese Taipei Football Association) Hualien Taikai
7	MF	Chan Pi-han	27 April 1992 (aged 22)	(Chinese Taipei Football Association) Taipei SCSC
8	MF	Wang Hsiang-huei	28 September 1987 (aged 26)	(Chinese Taipei Football Association) Hualien Taikai
9	FW	Lee Hsiu-chin	18 August 1992 (aged 22)	(Chinese Taipei Football Association) Taichung Blue Whale
10	MF	Lan Mei-fen	25 September 1983 (aged 30)	(Chinese Taipei Football Association) Hsinchu
11	FW	Lai Li-chin	15 August 1988 (aged 26)	(Chinese Taipei Football Association) Hualien Taikai
12	MF	Yu Hsiu-chin	1 June 1990 (aged 24)	(Chinese Taipei Football Association) Taipei SCSC
13	MF	Hsieh I-ling	15 January 1988 (aged 26)	(Chinese Taipei Football Association) Taipei SCSC
14	FW	Tsai Hsin-yun	24 June 1984 (aged 30)	(Chinese Taipei Football Association) Hsinchu
15	MF	Tsou Hsin-ni	11 January 1995 (aged 19)	(Chinese Taipei Football Association) Taichung Blue Whale
16	FW	Yang Ya-han	1 March 1991 (aged 23)	(Chinese Taipei Football Association) Hsinchu
17	MF	Tan Wen-lin	26 August 1989 (aged 25)	(Chinese Taipei Football Association) Hualien Taikai
18	GK	Chu Fong-yi	30 August 1989 (aged 25)	(Chinese Taipei Football Association) Taipei SCSC

=== Japan ===
Coach: Norio Sasaki

No.	Pos.	Player	Date of birth (age)	Club
1	GK	Ayumi Kaihori	4 September 1986 (aged 28)	(Japan Football Association) INAC Kobe Leonessa
2	DF	Saori Ariyoshi	1 November 1987 (aged 26)	(Japan Football Association) Nippon TV Beleza
3	DF	Azusa Iwashimizu	14 October 1986 (aged 27)	(Japan Football Association) Nippon TV Beleza
4	DF	Kana Kitahara	17 December 1988 (aged 25)	(Japan Football Association) Albirex Niigata
5	DF	Kana Osafune	16 October 1989 (aged 24)	(Japan Football Association) Vegalta Sendai
6	MF	Mizuho Sakaguchi	15 October 1987 (aged 26)	(Japan Football Association) Nippon TV Beleza
7	MF	Emi Nakajima	27 September 1990 (aged 23)	(Japan Football Association) INAC Kobe Leonessa
8	MF	Aya Miyama	28 January 1985 (aged 29)	(Japan Football Association) Okayama Yunogo Belle
9	MF	Nahomi Kawasumi	23 September 1985 (aged 28)	(United States Soccer Federation) Seattle Reign
10	FW	Megumi Takase	10 November 1990 (aged 23)	(Japan Football Association) INAC Kobe Leonessa
11	FW	Chinatsu Kira	5 July 1991 (aged 23)	(Japan Football Association) Urawa Red Diamonds
12	FW	Rika Masuya	14 September 1995 (aged 19)	(Japan Football Association) INAC Kobe Leonessa
13	FW	Yuika Sugasawa	5 October 1990 (aged 23)	(Japan Football Association) JEF United Chiba
14	MF	Nanase Kiryu	31 October 1989 (aged 24)	(United States Soccer Federation) Sky Blue
15	DF	Rie Usui	28 December 1989 (aged 24)	(Japan Football Association) Urawa Red Diamonds
16	DF	Hisui Haza	16 March 1996 (aged 18)	(Japan Football Association) Nippon Sport Science University
17	MF	Hikaru Naomoto	3 March 1994 (aged 20)	(Japan Football Association) Urawa Red Diamonds
18	GK	Erina Yamane	20 December 1990 (aged 23)	(Japan Football Association) JEF United Chiba

=== Jordan ===
Coach: (Japan) Masahiko Okiyama

No.	Pos.	Player	Date of birth (age)	Club
1	GK	Zina Al-Sadi	22 February 1994 (aged 20)	(Jordan Football Association) Shabab Al-Ordon
2	DF	Haya Khalil	12 September 1994 (aged 20)	(Jordan Football Association) Amman
5	DF	Anfal Al-Sufy	14 October 1995 (aged 18)	(Jordan Football Association) Al-Istiklal
6	DF	Razan Al-Zagha	23 March 1995 (aged 19)	(Jordan Football Association) Amman
7	DF	Yasmeen Khair	27 June 1987 (aged 27)	(Jordan Football Association) Shabab Al-Ordon
8	MF	Stephanie Al-Naber	12 July 1987 (aged 27)	(Jordan Football Association) Shabab Al-Ordon
9	FW	Abeer Al-Nahar	13 February 1991 (aged 23)	(Jordan Football Association) Amman
11	FW	Maysa Jbarah	20 September 1989 (aged 24)	(Jordan Football Association) Amman
12	GK	Tareiza Al-Oudat	3 December 1992 (aged 21)	(Jordan Football Association) Orthodox
13	DF	Ala'a Abu-Kasheh	23 April 1989 (aged 25)	(Jordan Football Association) Shabab Al-Ordon
14	DF	Enshirah Al-Hyasat	25 November 1991 (aged 22)	(Jordan Football Association) Shabab Al-Ordon
15	FW	Mai Sweilem	25 September 1995 (aged 18)	(Jordan Football Association) Amman
16	FW	Shahnaz Jebreen	28 July 1992 (aged 22)	(Jordan Football Association) Amman
17	FW	Sama'a Khraisat	15 August 1991 (aged 23)	(Jordan Football Association) Shabab Al-Ordon
18	DF	Hebah Fakhereddin	19 November 1990 (aged 23)	(Jordan Football Association) Shabab Al-Ordon
19	DF	Ayah Al-Majali	9 March 1992 (aged 22)	(Jordan Football Association) Shabab Al-Ordon
20	MF	Shorooq Shathli	6 January 1987 (aged 27)	(Jordan Football Association) Shabab Al-Ordon
22	MF	Maysam Abu-Khashabeh	17 May 1993 (aged 21)	(Jordan Football Association) Amman

== Group C ==
=== Hong Kong ===
Coach: Chan Shuk Chi

No.	Pos.	Player	Date of birth (age)	Club
1	GK	Leung Wai Nga	24 August 1988 (aged 26)	(Football Association of Hong Kong, China) Koz
2	DF	Ip Yuen Tung	20 September 1991 (aged 22)	(Football Association of Hong Kong, China) Chelsea
3	DF	Pauline Ng	8 March 1980 (aged 34)	(Football Association of Hong Kong, China) Koz
4	MF	Ng Wing Kum	6 May 1984 (aged 30)	(Football Association of Hong Kong, China) Citizen Eastern
5	DF	Chu Ling Ling	15 February 1987 (aged 27)	(Football Association of Hong Kong, China) Citizen Eastern
6	MF	Chan Wing Sze	11 September 1983 (aged 31)	(Football Association of Hong Kong, China) Citizen Eastern
7	FW	Kwong Wing Yan	25 July 1984 (aged 30)	(Football Association of Hong Kong, China) Koz
8	MF	Lau Mung King	4 June 1990 (aged 24)	(Football Association of Hong Kong, China) Citizen Eastern
10	MF	Wong Ka Man	29 July 1985 (aged 29)	(Football Association of Hong Kong, China) Koz
11	MF	Chun Ching Hang	16 July 1989 (aged 25)	(Football Association of Hong Kong, China) Koz
12	MF	Wong Shuk Fan	29 April 1980 (aged 34)	(Football Association of Hong Kong, China) Citizen Eastern
13	DF	Lau Yun Yi	18 February 1990 (aged 24)	(Football Association of Hong Kong, China) Citizen Eastern
14	FW	Sin Chung Yee	8 August 1992 (aged 22)	(Football Association of Hong Kong, China) Chelsea
15	DF	He Ying	5 January 1986 (aged 28)	(Football Association of Hong Kong, China) Koz
16	DF	Wong So Han	26 November 1991 (aged 22)	(Football Association of Hong Kong, China) Chelsea
17	MF	Cheung Wai Ki	22 November 1990 (aged 23)	(Football Association of Hong Kong, China) Citizen Eastern
18	GK	Ng Yuen Ki	20 December 1997 (aged 16)	(Football Association of Hong Kong, China) Chelsea
20	MF	Yiu Hei Man	22 September 1990 (aged 23)	(Football Association of Hong Kong, China) Citizen Eastern

=== North Korea ===
Coach: Kim Kwang-min

No.	Pos.	Player	Date of birth (age)	Club
1	GK	Hong Myong-hui	4 September 1991 (aged 23)	(DPR Korea Football Association) April 25
2	DF	Yun Song-mi	28 January 1992 (aged 22)	(DPR Korea Football Association) Pyongyang
3	FW	Ho Un-byol	19 January 1992 (aged 22)	(DPR Korea Football Association) April 25
4	FW	Choe Mi-gyong	17 January 1991 (aged 23)	(DPR Korea Football Association) Rimyongsu
5	DF	Ri Un-yong	1 September 1996 (aged 18)	(DPR Korea Football Association) Sobaeksu
6	DF	Kim Un-hyang	26 August 1993 (aged 21)	(DPR Korea Football Association) April 25
7	MF	Kim Su-gyong	4 January 1995 (aged 19)	(DPR Korea Football Association) April 25
8	MF	Kim Un-ju	9 April 1993 (aged 21)	(DPR Korea Football Association) April 25
9	MF	Jong Yu-ri	21 June 1992 (aged 22)	(DPR Korea Football Association) Sobaeksu
10	FW	Ra Un-sim	2 July 1988 (aged 26)	(DPR Korea Football Association) Amnokgang
11	MF	Ri Ye-gyong	26 October 1989 (aged 24)	(DPR Korea Football Association) Amnokgang
12	MF	Kim Yun-mi	1 July 1993 (aged 21)	(DPR Korea Football Association) April 25
13	FW	Wi Jong-sim	13 October 1997 (aged 16)	(DPR Korea Football Association) Kalmaegi
14	MF	Jon Myong-hwa	9 August 1993 (aged 21)	(DPR Korea Football Association) April 25
15	DF	Kim Nam-hui	4 March 1994 (aged 20)	(DPR Korea Football Association) April 25
16	DF	Kim Un-ha	23 March 1993 (aged 21)	(DPR Korea Football Association) Sobaeksu
17	GK	Jo Yun-mi	22 May 1989 (aged 25)	(DPR Korea Football Association) April 25
18	GK	Ra Sol-ju	13 January 1994 (aged 20)	(DPR Korea Football Association) April 25

=== Vietnam ===
Coach: Mai Đức Chung

No.	Pos.	Player	Date of birth (age)	Club
1	GK	Đặng Thị Kiều Trinh	19 December 1985 (aged 28)	(Vietnam Football Federation) Thành Phố Hồ Chí Minh
2	DF	Nguyễn Thị Xuyến	6 September 1987 (aged 27)	(Vietnam Football Federation) Hà Nội I
3	DF	Nguyễn Thị Mai	14 June 1990 (aged 24)	(Vietnam Football Federation) Than Khoáng Sản Việt Nam
4	DF	Trần Thị Hồng Nhung	28 October 1992 (aged 21)	(Vietnam Football Federation) Phong Phú Hà Nam
5	DF	Bùi Thị Như	16 June 1990 (aged 24)	(Vietnam Football Federation) Phong Phú Hà Nam
6	MF	Phạm Hoàng Quỳnh	20 September 1992 (aged 21)	(Vietnam Football Federation) Than Khoáng Sản Việt Nam
7	MF	Nguyễn Thị Tuyết Dung	13 December 1993 (aged 20)	(Vietnam Football Federation) Phong Phú Hà Nam
8	MF	Nguyễn Thị Liễu	18 September 1992 (aged 22)	(Vietnam Football Federation) Phong Phú Hà Nam
9	MF	Trần Thị Thùy Trang	8 August 1988 (aged 26)	(Vietnam Football Federation) Thành Phố Hồ Chí Minh
10	FW	Phạm Hải Yến	9 November 1994 (aged 19)	(Vietnam Football Federation) Hà Nội I
11	MF	Nguyễn Thị Nguyệt	5 November 1992 (aged 21)	(Vietnam Football Federation) Phong Phú Hà Nam
12	DF	Vũ Thị Nhung	9 July 1992 (aged 22)	(Vietnam Football Federation) Hà Nội I
13	FW	Nguyễn Thị Muôn	7 October 1988 (aged 25)	(Vietnam Football Federation) Hà Nội I
14	GK	Lê Thị Tuyết Mai	15 February 1985 (aged 29)	(Vietnam Football Federation) Thành Phố Hồ Chí Minh
15	DF	Nguyễn Thị Ngọc Anh	23 February 1985 (aged 29)	(Vietnam Football Federation) Hà Nội I
16	MF	Nguyễn Thị Thành	20 November 1986 (aged 27)	(Vietnam Football Federation) Hà Nội I
17	DF	Nguyễn Hải Hòa	22 December 1989 (aged 24)	(Vietnam Football Federation) TNG Thái Nguyên
18	FW	Nguyễn Thị Minh Nguyệt	16 November 1986 (aged 27)	(Vietnam Football Federation) Hà Nội I
