= Football at the 2014 Asian Games =

International sporting competition

- Venues: Munhak Stadium; Wa~ Stadium; Incheon Football Stadium; Namdong Asiad Rugby Field; Goyang Stadium; Hwaseong Stadium
- Dates: 14 September – 2 October
- Competitors: 770 from 30 nations

Football at the 2014 Asian Games was held in Incheon, South Korea from 14 September to 3 October 2014. The opening match was played 5 days prior to the opening ceremony. In this tournament, 29 teams are playing in the men's competition, and 11 teams are participating in the women's competition.

The age limit for the men teams is under-23; the same as the age limit in football competitions in the Olympic Games, while three overage players are allowed among each squad.

== Venues ==
Incheon
Munhak Stadium	Incheon Football Stadium	Namdong Asiad Rugby Field
Capacity: 49,084	Capacity: 20,891	Capacity: 5,078
Goyang	Ansan	Hwaseong
Goyang Stadium	Wa~ Stadium	Hwaseong Stadium
Capacity: 41,311	Capacity: 35,000	Capacity: 35,270

== Schedule ==
P	Preliminary round	R	Round of 16	¼	Quarterfinals	½	Semifinals	F	Finals

Event↓/Date →	14th Sun	15th Mon	16th Tue	17th Wed	18th Thu	19th Fri	20th Sat	21st Sun	22nd Mon	23rd Tue	24th Wed	25th Thu	26th Fri	27th Sat	28th Sun	29th Mon	30th Tue	1st Wed	2nd Thu
Men	P	P		P	P			P	P			R	R		¼		½		F
Women	P	P	P	P	P		P	P	P	P			¼			½		F	

== Medalists ==
Event	Gold	Silver	Bronze
Men	South Korea; Kim Seung-gyu; Choi Sung-keun; Kim Jin-su; Kim Min-hyeok; Lee Joo-young; Son Jun-ho; An Yong-woo; Park Joo-ho; Lee Yong-jae; Kim Seung-dae; Yun Il-lok; No Dong-geon; Kwak Hae-seong; Kim Young-uk; Rim Chang-woo; Lee Jong-ho; Lee Jae-sung; Kim Shin-wook; Moon Sang-yun; Jang Hyun-soo	North Korea; Ri Myong-guk; Jong Kwang-sok; Jang Song-hyok; Kim Chol-bom; Jang Kuk-chol; Kang Kuk-chol; Jo Kwang; Ju Jong-chol; Rim Kwang-hyok; Kim Ju-song; Jong Il-gwan; Ri Yong-jik; Sim Hyon-jin; Yun Il-gwang; Ri Hyok-chol; Kim Yong-il; So Hyon-uk; An Tae-song; Pak Kwang-ryong; So Kyong-jin	Iraq; Ali Yasin; Mahdi Karim; Ali Bahjat; Mustafa Nadhim; Saad Natiq; Ali Adnan; Saad Abdul-Amir; Saif Salman; Dhurgham Ismail; Younis Mahmoud; Humam Tariq; Jalal Hassan; Sameh Saeed; Amjad Kalaf; Salam Shaker; Marwan Hussein; Farhan Shakor; Bashar Resan; Mahdi Kamil; Mohammed Hameed
Women	North Korea; Hong Myong-hui; Yun Song-mi; Ho Un-byol; Choe Mi-gyong; Ri Un-yong; Kim Un-hyang; Kim Su-gyong; Kim Un-ju; Jong Yu-ri; Ra Un-sim; Ri Ye-gyong; Kim Yun-mi; Wi Jong-sim; Jon Myong-hwa; Kim Nam-hui; Kim Un-ha; Jo Yun-mi; Ra Sol-ju	Japan; Ayumi Kaihori; Saori Ariyoshi; Azusa Iwashimizu; Kana Kitahara; Kana Osafune; Mizuho Sakaguchi; Emi Nakajima; Aya Miyama; Nahomi Kawasumi; Megumi Takase; Chinatsu Kira; Rika Masuya; Yuika Sugasawa; Nanase Kiryu; Rie Usui; Hisui Haza; Hikaru Naomoto; Erina Yamane	South Korea; Jun Min-kyung; Song Su-ran; Kim Hye-ri; Shim Seo-yeon; Kim Do-yeon; Lim Seon-joo; Jeon Ga-eul; Cho So-hyun; Jung Seol-bin; Ji So-yun; Park Hee-young; Yoo Young-a; Kwon Hah-nul; Lee So-dam; Choe Yu-ri; Lee Young-ju; Shin Dam-yeong; Kim Jung-mi

== Medal table ==
Rank	Nation	Gold	Silver	Bronze	Total
1	North Korea (PRK)	1	1	0	2
2	South Korea (KOR)	1	0	1	2
3	Japan (JPN)	0	1	0	1
4	Iraq (IRQ)	0	0	1	1
Totals (4 entries)		2	2	2	6

== Draw ==
A draw ceremony was held on 21 August 2014 to determine the groups for the men's and women's competitions. The teams were seeded based on their final ranking at the 2010 Asian Games.

=== Men ===
Group A

- South Korea
- Malaysia
- Saudi Arabia
- Laos

Group B

- Uzbekistan
- Hong Kong
- Bangladesh
- Afghanistan

Group C

- Oman
- Palestine
- Singapore
- Tajikistan

Group D

- Japan
- Kuwait
- Iraq
- Nepal

Group E

- Thailand
- Maldives
- East Timor
- Indonesia

Group F

- North Korea
- China
- Pakistan

Group G

- United Arab Emirates
- India
- Jordan

Group H

- Iran
- Vietnam
- Kyrgyzstan

=== Women ===
Group A

- South Korea
- Thailand
- India
- Maldives

Group B

- Japan
- China
- Jordan
- Chinese Taipei

Group C

- North Korea
- Vietnam
- Hong Kong

== Final standing ==
=== Men ===
Rank	Team	Pld	W	D	L	GF	GA	GD	Pts
1st place, gold medalist(s)	South Korea	7	7	0	0	13	0	+13	21
2nd place, silver medalist(s)	North Korea	6	5	0	1	11	2	+9	15
3rd place, bronze medalist(s)	Iraq	7	6	0	1	18	4	+14	18
4	Thailand	7	5	0	2	15	3	+12	15
5	Japan	5	3	0	2	13	5	+8	9
6	Saudi Arabia	5	3	0	2	9	6	+3	9
7	Jordan	4	3	0	1	5	2	+3	9
8	Uzbekistan	4	2	1	1	11	4	+7	7
9	Hong Kong	4	2	1	1	5	6	−1	7
10	United Arab Emirates	4	2	0	2	8	3	+5	6
11	Indonesia	4	2	0	2	12	10	+2	6
12	Vietnam	3	2	0	1	6	4	+2	6
13	Tajikistan	4	2	0	2	5	6	−1	6
14	Palestine	4	2	0	2	5	7	−2	6
15	Singapore	3	1	1	1	5	5	0	4
16	Kuwait	3	1	0	2	6	7	−1	3
17	Malaysia	3	1	0	2	4	6	−2	3
18	Bangladesh	3	1	0	2	2	5	−3	3
19	China	3	1	0	2	1	5	−4	3
20	Maldives	3	1	0	2	3	8	−5	3
21	Oman	3	0	1	2	3	6	−3	1
22	Iran	2	0	1	1	2	5	−3	1
23	Kyrgyzstan	3	0	1	2	1	4	−3	1
24	Pakistan	2	0	0	2	0	3	−3	0
25	Afghanistan	3	0	0	3	1	8	−7	0
26	India	2	0	0	2	0	7	−7	0
27	Laos	3	0	0	3	0	9	−9	0
28	East Timor	3	0	0	3	2	13	−11	0
29	Nepal	3	0	0	3	0	13	−13	0

=== Women ===
Rank	Team	Pld	W	D	L	GF	GA	GD	Pts
1st place, gold medalist(s)	North Korea	5	5	0	0	16	2	+14	15
2nd place, silver medalist(s)	Japan	6	4	1	1	28	3	+25	13
3rd place, bronze medalist(s)	South Korea	6	5	0	1	33	2	+31	15
4	Vietnam	5	2	0	3	7	12	−5	6
5	China	4	2	1	1	9	1	+8	7
6	Thailand	4	2	0	2	21	7	+14	6
7	Chinese Taipei	4	0	1	3	2	10	−8	1
8	Hong Kong	3	0	0	3	0	19	−19	0
9	India	3	1	0	2	15	20	−5	3
10	Jordan	3	0	1	2	2	19	−17	1
11	Maldives	3	0	0	3	0	38	−38	0
