= Maldives women's national football team results =

This is a list of the Maldives women's national football team results from 2000 to the present day.

== 2000s ==
=== 2004 ===
| 1 October 2004 AFF C'ship; Group A | Myanmar | 17–0 | Maldives | Ho Chi Minh City, Vietnam |
| Match 1 | Malar Win 4', 7', 15', 18', 51', 56'; Thet Thet Win 6'; Aye Nander 16', 43'; Tha Than 21', 61'; Zin Min War 32', 33', 42'; Thi Da Oo 64'; Khin Kyew 84', 90' | Report |

| 4 October 2004 AFF C'ship; Group A | Vietnam | 14–0 | Maldives | Ho Chi Minh City, Vietnam |
| Match 2 | Do Thi Anh 4'; Nguyen Thi Dieu 19', 30', 35', 38', 46', 61'; Vo Thi Thua 29', 39'; Nguyen Thi Hien 58', 67'; Le Thi Oanh 70', 80', 85' | Report |

=== 2005 ===
| 13 June 2006 AFC Asian Cup; Qualification Group C | Maldives | 0–6 | Uzbekistan | Hanoi, Vietnam |
| Match 3 | | [Report] |

| 19 June 2006 AFC Asian Cup; Qualification Group C | Hong Kong | 4–0 | Maldives | Hanoi, Vietnam |
| Match 4 | | [Report] |

=== 2007 ===
| 19 February 2008 Summer Olympics; Qualification Group B | Maldives | 0–6 | Singapore | Bangkok, Thailand |
| Match 5 | | Report | Noor Azeen Adam 9', 47'; Huraizah Ismail 44' Sheau Shyan Yeong 59'; Shi Ya Lim 68', 72' | Stadium: Thai-Japanese Stadium |

| 21 February 2008 Summer Olympics; Qualification Group B | Vietnam | 5–0 | Maldives | Bangkok, Thailand |
| Match 6 | Thi Thanh Van 15'; Thi Huong Nguyen 18'; Thi Tuyet Mai 32', 59'; Thi Minh Nguyet 49' | Report | | Stadium: Thai-Japanese Stadium |

| 23 February 2008 Summer Olympics; Qualification Group B | Thailand | 9–0 | Maldives | Bangkok, Thailand |
| Match 7 | Sunisa Srangthaisong 12'; Chidtawan Chawong 23'; Junpen Seesrum 29'; Pitsamai Sornsai 42'; Kitiya Thiangtham 45', 46', 76'; Suphaphon Kaeobasen 45' | Report | | Stadium: Thai-Japanese Stadium |

| 22 April International Friendly | Maldives | 0–7 | Bahrain | Male', Maldives |
| Match 8 | | [Report] | | Stadium: Rasmee Dhandu Stadium |

| 25 April International Friendly | Maldives | 1–1 | Bahrain | Male', Maldives |
| Match 9 | Aishath Fazla, jersey 10 | [Report] | | Stadium: Rasmee Dhandu Stadium |

=== 2009 ===
| 25 April 2010 AFC Asian Cup; Qualification First Round | Maldives | 0–4 | Palestine | Kuala Lumpur, Malaysia |
| Match 10 | | Report | Caroline Sohgian 40'; Walaa Hussein 45', 53'; Hamama Jorban 60' | Stadium: KLFA Stadium; Attendance: 100; Referee: Rita Gani (Malaysia) |

| 27 April 2010 AFC Asian Cup; Qualification First Round | Maldives | 0–5 | Uzbekistan | Kuala Lumpur, Malaysia |
| Match 11 | | Report | Makhliyo Sarikova 7'; Komola Usmanova 14'; Nargiza Abdurasulova 28' (pen.), 31', 75' | Stadium: KLFA Stadium; Attendance: 100; Referee: Shen Huangying (China) |

| 29 April 2010 AFC Asian Cup; Qualification First Round | Jordan | 9–0 | Maldives | Kuala Lumpur, Malaysia |
| Match 12 | Abeer Al-Nahar 9', 26', 67'; Maysa Jbarah 15', 27'; Stephanie Al-Naber 52', 60', 71' (pen.), 90+2' | Report | | Stadium: KLFA Stadium; Attendance: 70; Referee: Kamnueng Pannipar (Thailand) |

| 3 May 2010 AFC Asian Cup; Qualification First Round | Kyrgyzstan | 2–0 | Maldives | Kuala Lumpur, Malaysia |
| Match 13 | Svetlana Pokachalova 8', 90+1' | Report | | Stadium: KLFA Stadium; Attendance: 70; Referee: Rita Gani (Malaysia) |

== 2010s ==
=== 2010 ===
| 5 November International Friendly | Sri Lanka | 2–0 | Maldives | Kalutara, Colombo, Sri Lanka |
| Match 14 | | [Report] |

| 7 November International Friendly | Sri Lanka | 3–0 | Maldives | Baddagana, Sri Lanka |
| Match 15 | | [Report] |

| 12 December South Asian Games Group B | Nepal | 6–0 | Maldives | Cox's Bazar, Bangladesh |
| Match 16 | | Report |

| 14 November South Asian Games Group B | Pakistan | 2–1 | Maldives | Cox's Bazar, Bangladesh |
| Match 17 | Mehwish 45'; Malaika 89' (pen.) | Report | Aishath Fazla 4' |

| 18 November South Asian Games Group B | Afghanistan | 2–2 | Maldives | Cox's Bazar, Bangladesh |
| Match 18 | | [Report] |

=== 2012 ===
| 31 March International Friendly | Qatar | 4–1 | Maldives | Doha, Qatar |
| Match 19 | Goal | Report (in English); Report (in Dhivehi) | Shiyana |

| 8 September 2012 SAFF C'ship Group B | Maldives | 1–1 | Afghanistan | Colombo, Sri Lanka |
| Match 20 | Fathimath Afza 30' | Report; Report (in Dhivehi) | 2' Hailai Argharndival | Stadium: CR & FC Grounds |

| 10 September 2012 SAFF C'ship Group B | Nepal | 5–0 | Maldives | Colombo, Sri Lanka |
| Match 21 | Dipa Adhikari 19'; Anu Lama 35'; Jamuna Gurung 59', 88' (90+1) | Report | | Stadium: CR & FC Grounds |

| 12 September 2012 SAFF C'ship Group B | Maldives | 0–3 | Pakistan | Colombo, Sri Lanka |
| Match 22 | | Report | Hajra Khan 12', 85'; Malika Noor 69' | Stadium: CR & FC Grounds |

| 24 November International Friendly | Kuwait | 1–1 | Maldives | Kuwait City, Kuwait |
| Match 23 | Goal | Report (in Dhivehi) | 43' Fathimath Shaliya | Stadium: Kuwait National Stadium |

| 27 November International Friendly | Kuwait | 1–3 | Maldives | Kuwait City, Kuwait |
| Match 24 | Goal | Report (in Dhivehi) | Fathimath Shaliya; Aishath Mahin | Stadium: Kuwait National Stadium |

=== 2013 ===
| 25 June International Friendly | Maldives | 1–0 | Qatar | Male', Maldives |
| Match 25 | Fadhuwa Zahir 27' | Report (in English); Report (in Dhivehi) | | Stadium: Rasmee Dhandu Stadium |

| 27 June International Friendly | Maldives | 3–0 | Qatar | Male', Maldives |
| Match 26 | Fadhuwa Zahir 22', 45'; Mariyam Mirufath 51' | Report (in English) | | Stadium: Rasmee Dhandu Stadium |

=== 2014 ===
| 14 September 2014 Asian Games Group A | India | 15–0 | Maldives | South Korea |
| Match 26 | Sasmita 5', 21', 26', 80', 88'; Kamala 18', 23', 31', 45+2', 65'; Bala 20', 45+1'; Ashalata 53'; Bembem 55'; Prameshwori 90+4' | Report | | Stadium: Namdong Asiad Rugby Field; Referee: Nami Imaizumi (Japan) |

| 17 September 2014 Asian Games Group A | Thailand | 10–0 | Maldives | South Korea |
| Match 27 | Romyen 12', 24', 42'; Sornsai 23', 40', 45+2', 76'; Boothduang 33'; Srimanee 58'; Seesraum 63' | Report | | Stadium: Namdong Asiad Rugby Field; Referee: Nami Imaizumi (Japan) |

| 21 September 2014 Asian Games Group A | Maldives | 0–13 | South Korea | South Korea |
| Match 28 | | Report | Jung Seol-bin 9'; Leeza 24' (o.g.); Lee So-dam 33' (pen.); Song Su-ran 36'; Park Hee-young 38'; Shin Dam-yeong 61'; Jeon Ga-eul 62'; Kwon Hah-nul 66', 84'; Yoo Young-a 69', 82'; Cho So-hyun 75'; Choe Yu-ri 88' | Stadium: Munhak Stadium; Referee: Li Juan (China) |

| 13 November 2014 SAFF C'ship Group A | India | 8–0 | Maldives | Islamabad, Pakistan |
| Match 29 | Ngangom Bala Devi 24', 46', 72', 74'; Yumnam Kamala Devi 64', 85'; Oinam Bembem Devi 76'; Jyoti Ann Burrett 90' | Report | | Stadium: Jinnah Sports Stadium; Attendance: 250 |

| 15 November 2014 SAFF C'ship Group A | Maldives | 1–0 | Afghanistan | Islamabad, Pakistan |
| Match 30 | Mariyam Rifa 34' | Report | | Stadium: Jinnah Sports Stadium; Attendance: 2000 |

| 17 November 2014 SAFF C'ship Group A | Maldives | 1–3 | Bangladesh | Islamabad, Pakistan |
| Match 31 | Aishath Sama 81' | Report | Maynum Rana 18'; Sabina Khatun 35', 87' | Stadium: Jinnah Sports Stadium; Attendance: 900 |

=== 2015 ===
| 31 July 2015 IOIG | Mayotte | 1–1 (4–3 p) | Maldives | Saint-André, Réunion |
| Match 32 | | | | Stadium: Stade Baby-Larivière |

| 2 August 2015 IOIG | Seychelles | 4–1 | Maldives | Réunion |
| Match 33 | Bibi 15', 46', 70'; César 87' | | Areesha 27' |

=== 2016 ===
| 24 January International Friendly | Bahrain | 4–0 | Maldives | Hamad Town, Bahrain |
| Match 34 | Reem Al Hashmi ?', ?'; Manar Jassim ?', ?' | Report | | Stadium: Hamad Town Stadium; Attendance: 150 |

| 28 January International Friendly | Bahrain | 1–0 | Maldives | Riffa, Bahrain |
| Match 35 | Yasmine Fayez | Report | | Stadium: Bahrain National Stadium; Attendance: 150 |

| 5 February 2016 South Asian Games | India | 0–0 | Maldives | Shillong, India |
| Match 36 | | Report | | Stadium: Jawaharlal Nehru Stadium; Attendance: 5000 |

| 7 February 2016 South Asian Games | Nepal | 2–0 | Maldives | Shillong, India |
| Match 37 | Anu Lama 36'; Niru Thapa 89' | | | Stadium: Jawaharlal Nehru Stadium |

| 9 February 2016 South Asian Games | Maldives | 0–2 | Bangladesh | Shillong, India |
| Match 38 | | Report | 48' Marzia Akhter; 73' Sabina Khatun | Stadium: Jawaharlal Nehru Stadium |

| 11 February 2016 South Asian Games | Sri Lanka | 1–2 | Maldives | Shillong, India |
| Match 39 | Hasara Dilrangi 90+1' | | 6', 45' (pen.) Fadhuwa Zahir | Stadium: Jawaharlal Nehru Stadium |

| 3 March International Friendly | United Arab Emirates | 2–1 | Maldives | Dubai, United Arab Emirates |
| Match 40 | Shahad Budebs ?', ?' | | | Stadium: Theyab Awana Stadium |

| 6 March International Friendly | United Arab Emirates | 1–0 | Maldives | Dubai, United Arab Emirates |
| Match 41 | Naeema Ghareeb ?' | | | Stadium: Theyab Awana Stadium |

| 18 December International Friendly | United Arab Emirates | 0–1 | Maldives | Dubai, United Arab Emirates |
| Match 42 | | | | Stadium: Theyab Awana Stadium |

| 21 December International Friendly | United Arab Emirates | 1–0 | Maldives | Dubai, United Arab Emirates |
| Match 43 | Maryam Al Rumaithi ?' | | | Stadium: Theyab Awana Stadium |

| 26 December 2016 SAFF C'ship Group A | Sri Lanka | 2–5 | Maldives | Siliguri, West Bengal |
| Match 44 | Liyanage 43'; Kumudini 45+2' | Report | Rifa 24'; Zahir 27', 64', 80'; Shamila 88' | Stadium: Kanchenjunga Stadium; Attendance: 2613 |

| 28 December 2016 SAFF C'ship Group A | Maldives | 0–9 | Nepal | Siliguri, West Bengal |
| Match 45 | | Report | Bhandari 12', 28', 39', 50', 63'; Yonjan 52'; Lama 71'; Bhujel 74'; BK 90+3' | Stadium: Kanchenjunga Stadium; Attendance: 7462 |

| 30 December 2016 SAFF C'ship Group A | Maldives | 3–1 | Bhutan | Siliguri, West Bengal |
| Match 46 | Zahir 18', 90'; Shamila 36' | Report | Ghalley 81' | Stadium: Kanchenjunga Stadium; Attendance: 6701 |

=== 2017 ===
| 2 January 2016 SAFF C'ship Semi-final | Bangladesh | 6–0 | Maldives | Siliguri, West Bengal |
| Match 47 | Shopna 11', 22', 58'; Sabina Khatun 48', 64' (pen.); Nargis Khatun 52' | Report | | Stadium: Kanchenjunga Stadium; Attendance: 8464; Referee: P.Singh (India) |

| 21 January International Friendly | Bahrain | 5–1 | Maldives | Isa Town, Bahrain |
| Match 48 | Reem Al Hashmi; Yasmine Fayez; Yasmine Fayez; Own goal Al Anood Al Khalifa | Report | | Stadium: Khalifa Sports City Stadium; Attendance: 150 |

| 24 January International Friendly | Bahrain | 3–1 | Maldives | Hamad Town, Bahrain |
| Match 49 | Reem Al Hashmi; Reem Al Hashmi; Al Anood Al Khalifa | Report | | Stadium: Hamad Town Stadium; Attendance: 150 |

=== 2018 ===
| 5 March International Friendly | Singapore | 2–0 | Maldives | Kallang, Singapore |
| Match 50 | Putri Nur Syaliza 51'; Stephanie Gigette A Dominguez 87' | | | Stadium: National Stadium |

| 16 August 2018 Asian Games Group A | Indonesia | 6–0 | Maldives | Palembang, Indonesia |
| Match 51 | Musdalifah 10', 72'; Zp 15' (pen.), 55'; Sada 30'; Sari 61' | Report | | Stadium: Gelora Sriwijaya Stadium; Referee: Thein Thein Aye (Myanmar) |

| 19 August 2018 Asian Games Group A | Maldives | 0–8 | South Korea | Palembang, Indonesia |
| Match 52 | | Report | Ji So-yun 25' (pen.); Shamila 35' (o.g.); Son Hwa-yeon 35', 60', 87'; Moon Mi-ra 45', 54' (pen.); Lee Eun-mi 88' | Stadium: Gelora Sriwijaya Stadium; Referee: Law Bik Chi (Hong Kong) |

| 21 August 2018 Asian Games Group A | Chinese Taipei | 7–0 | Maldives | Palembang, Indonesia |
| Match 53 | Yu Hsiu-chin 6' (pen.); Pan Shin-yu 12', 31'; Zhuo Li-ping 17', 74'; Michelle Pao 55'; Lee Hsiu-chin 63' | Report | | Stadium: Gelora Sriwijaya Stadium; Referee: Pansa Chaisanit (Thailand) |

| 8 November 2020 Olympic Qualification; First round – Group D | Jordan | 6–0 | Maldives | Al-Ram, Palestine |
| Match 54 | Al-Nahar 3'; Jebreen 13'; Al-Sufy 16', 90+2'; Al-Majali 73'; Hina 88' | Report | | Stadium: Faisal Al-Husseini International Stadium; Attendance: 180; Referee: Thein Thein Aye (Myanmar) |

| 11 November 2020 Olympic Qualification; First round – Group D | Maldives | 1–3 | Indonesia | Al-Ram, Palestine |
| Match 55 | Fadhuwa 73' | Report | Sari 22'; Oktafiani 49', 69' | Stadium: Faisal Al-Husseini International Stadium; Attendance: 100; Referee: Cha Min-ji (South Korea) |

| 13 November 2020 Olympic Qualification; First round – Group D | Palestine | 2–1 | Maldives | Al-Ram, Palestine |
| Match 56 | Sohgian 69' (pen.); Kanaaneh 74' | Report | Mariyam 23' | Stadium: Faisal Al-Husseini International Stadium; Attendance: 150; Referee: Law Bik Chi (Hong Kong) |

| 23 November 2018 FAS Quadrangular Tournament; Semi-final | Maldives | 0–1 | Singapore | Kallang, Singapore |
| Match 57 | | Report | Nur Raudhah Binte Kamis 63' | Stadium: Jalan Besar Stadium, Singapore |

| 25 November 2018 FAS Quadrangular Tournament; Third place play-off | Maldives | 0–0 (2–1 p) | Indonesia | Kallang, Singapore |
| Match 58 | | Report | | Stadium: Jalan Besar Stadium, Singapore |

| 3 December International Friendly | Bahrain | 7–0 | Maldives | Bahrain |
| Match 59 | | Report |

| 5 December International Friendly | Bahrain | 4–0 | Maldives | Bahrain |
| Match 60 | | Report |

| 9 December International Friendly | Bahrain | 4–0 | Maldives | Bahrain |
| Match 61 |

=== 2019 ===
| March International Friendly | United Arab Emirates | 2–0 | Maldives | United Arab Emirates |
| Match 62 | | Report |

| March International Friendly | United Arab Emirates | 1–1 | Maldives | United Arab Emirates |
| Match 63 | | Report | Rifa ??' |

| 13 March 2019 SAFF C'ship Group B | India | 6–0 | Maldives | Biratnagar, Nepal |
| Match 64 | Sanju 27', 89'; Grace 8'; Sweety 13'; Indumathi 23'; Ratanbala 45+4' | SAFF AIFF | | Stadium: Sahid Rangsala; Attendance: 1,813; Referee: Ashmita Manandhar (Nepal) |

| 15 March 2019 SAFF C'ship Group B | Maldives | 0–2 | Sri Lanka | Biratnagar, Nepal |
| Match 65 | | SAFF ANFA | Chalini 40', 50' | Stadium: Sahid Rangsala; Attendance: 1,464; Referee: Dulal Mridha (Bangladesh) |

| November International Friendly | United Arab Emirates | 0–0 | Maldives | United Arab Emirates |
| Match 66 | | Report |

| 3 December 2019 South Asian Games | India | 5–0 | Maldives | Pokhara, Nepal |
| Match 67 | Grace 5'; B. Devi 24', 33'; Kalyan 87'; Tudu 88' | Report | | Stadium: Pokhara Rangasala; Attendance: 150 |

| 5 December 2019 South Asian Games | Maldives | 0–3 | Nepal | Pokhara, Nepal |
| Match 68 | | Report | Bhandari 20', 25', 90+1' | Stadium: Pokhara Rangasala; Attendance: 600 |

| 7 December 2019 South Asian Games | Maldives | 2–1 | Sri Lanka | Pokhara, Nepal |
| Match 69 | S. Aminath 37'; F. Saina 54' | Report | C. Ekanayake 85' | Stadium: Pokhara Rangasala; Attendance: 200 |

== 2020s ==
=== 2021 ===
| 23 September 2022 AFC Women's Asian Cup qualification Group B | Maldives | 0–16 | Vietnam | Dushanbe, Tajikistan |
| 18:00 UTC+5 | | Report | Nguyễn Thị Thanh Nhã 11', 62'; Haneefa 13' (o.g.); Nguyễn Thị Tuyết Dung 16', 65'; Nguyễn Thị Tuyết Ngân 33'; Trần Thị Thùy Trang 41'; Chương Thị Kiều 50'; Phạm Hải Yến 51', 58', 67', 73', 79', 84'; Huỳnh Như 56'; Hồ Thị Quỳnh 82' | Stadium: Pamir Stadium; Attendance: 0 Referee: Mahsa Ghorbani (Iran) |

| 26 September 2022 AFC Women's Asian Cup qualification Group B | Tajikistan | 4–0 | Maldives | Dushanbe, Tajikistan |
| 18:00 UTC+5 | Khalimova 2', 24'; Khudododova 14'; Sotnikova 58' | Report | | Stadium: Pamir Stadium; Attendance: 300; Referee: Kim Yu-jeong (South Korea) |

| September 2022 AFC Women's Asian Cup qualification Group B | Maldives | cancelled | Afghanistan | Tajikistan |
| --:-- UTC+5 |

=== 2022 ===
| 15 February Friendly | Maldives | 1–0 | Seychelles | Malé, Maldives |
| 21:00 UTC+5 | Noora 10' | | | Stadium: National Football Stadium |

| 18 February Friendly | Maldives | 0–4 | Seychelles | Malé, Maldives |
| 21:00 UTC+5 | | | Esther 12'; Bibi 71', 88'; Moustache 74' | Stadium: National Football Stadium |

| 24 February Friendly | Maldives | 0–2 | Saudi Arabia | Malé, Maldives |
| --:-- UTC+5 | | Report | Mobarak 62', 82' | Stadium: Galolhu Rasmee Dhandu Stadium; Referee: Javiz Mohamed (Maldives) |

| 7 September 2022 SAFF W GS | Bangladesh | 3–0 | Maldives | Kathmandu, Nepal |
| 17:30 | Sabina 32', 40'; Masura 34' | Report | | Stadium: Dashrath Stadium; Attendance: 240; Referee: Anjana Rai (Nepal) |

| 10 September 2022 SAFF W GS | Maldives | 0–9 | India | Kathmandu, Nepal |
| 17:30 | | Report | Tamang 24', 45+2', 85', 88'; Priyangka 42'; Grace 53', 86'; Guguloth 55'; M.K. Kashmina Devi 84' | Stadium: Dashrath Stadium; Attendance: 180; Referee: Anjana Rai (Nepal) |

| 13 September 2022 SAFF W GS | Maldives | 0–7 | Pakistan | Kathmandu, Nepal |
| 13:00 | | Report | Rameen 39'; Khadija 49' (pen.); Nadia 54', 78', 84', 90'; Anmol 90+5' | Stadium: Dashrath Stadium; Attendance: 97; Referee: Yapa Y.A. Pabasara Minisarani (Sri Lanka) |

=== 2023 ===
| April 2023 2024 AFC Olympic Qualifiers Round 1 | Myanmar | Cancelled | Maldives | TBD |
| --:-- |

| April 2023 2024 AFC Olympic Qualifiers Round 1 | Maldives | Cancelled | Iran | TBD |
| --:-- |

| April 2023 2024 AFC Olympic Qualifiers Round 1 | Bangladesh | Cancelled | Maldives | TBD |
| --:-- |

=== 2024 ===
| 18 October 2024 SAFF W GS | Sri Lanka | 1–0 | Maldives | Kathmandu, Nepal |
| 17:30 | | | | Stadium: Dashrath Stadium |

| 21 October 2024 SAFF W GS | Maldives | 0–11 | Nepal | Kathmandu, Nepal |
| 17:30 | | | Preeti 5', 65', 87' (pen.); Sabita Rana Magar 29'; Rekha 32', 42', 48', 63', 78'; Anita KC 69'; Amisha Karki 88' | Stadium: Dashrath Stadium; Attendance: 6,671; Referee: Y.A. Pabasara Minisaraniyapa (Sri Lanka) |

| 24 October 2024 SAFF W GS | Maldives | 0–13 | Bhutan | Kathmandu, Nepal |
| 13:30 | | | Sonam Choden 5'; Tshering 7', 18'; Lhazom 15', 19', 47', 53', 71' (pen.); Namgyel Dema 41'; Deki Yangdon 48'; Tshering Yanden 65', 80'; Tshering Lhaden 68' | Stadium: Dashrath Stadium; Referee: Jaya Chakma (Bangladesh) |

| 30 December Friendly | India | 14–0 | Maldives | Bengaluru, India |
| 15:30 | Xaxa 7', 8', 15'; Lynda Kom 12', 21', 29', 52'; Neha Sillay 16', 45'; Basfore 51'; Ranjana 54'; Kajol 59', 66'; Rimpa 62' | Report | | Stadium: Padukone – Dravid Centre for Sports Excellence; Referee: Kanika Barman (India) |

=== 2025 ===
| 2 January Friendly | India | 11–1 | Maldives | Bengaluru, India |
| 15:30 | Lhingdeikim 12', 16', 56', 59'; Kajol 15'; Hawwa Haneefa 17' (o.g.); Pooja 41'; Sibani Devi 45+1'; Simran 62', 68'; Bhumika Devi 71' (pen.) | Report | Mariyam Rifa 27' | Stadium: Padukone – Dravid Centre for Sports Excellence; Referee: Ranjita Devi Tekcham (India) |

| 29 June Asian Cup qualifiers | Vietnam | 7–0 | Maldives | Việt Trì, Vietnam |
| --:-- UTC+7 | Ngân Thị Vạn Sự 7', 11'; Nguyễn Thị Bích Thùy 14'; Nguyễn Thị Vạn 25'; Nguyễn Thị Mỹ Anh 30'; Ngọc Minh Chuyên 44'; Phạm Hải Yến 67' | Report | | Stadium: Việt Trì Stadium; Referee: Dong Fangyu (China) |

| 2 July Asian Cup qualifiers | Maldives | 0–3 | Guam | Việt Trì, Vietnam |
| --:-- UTC+7 | | Report | Bartosh 45', 56', 75' | Stadium: Việt Trì Stadium; Referee: Haneen Murad (Jordan) |

| 5 July Asian Cup qualifiers | United Arab Emirates | 5–0 | Maldives | Việt Trì, Vietnam |
| --:-- UTC+7 | Al-Zaabi 28', 45+4', 47'; Al-Hosani 68'; Al-Hazmi 90+1' | Report | | Stadium: Việt Trì Stadium; Referee: Anjana Rai (Nepal) |

=== 2026 ===
| 25 May 2026 2026 SAFF GS | Maldives | 0–11 | India | Margao, India |
| 19:30 (19:00 MVT UTC+5) | | Report | Naorem 11', 17'; Xaxa 28'; A. Singh 34', 66', 70', 86'; Dangmei 40'; Shirvoikar 53', 68'; Basfore 60' | Stadium: Jawaharlal Nehru Stadium; Attendance: 225; Referee: Sharaban Tahura (Bangladesh) |

| 29 May 2026 2026 SAFF GS | Bangladesh | 4–2 | Maldives | Margao, India |
| 19:30 (19:00 MVT UTC+5) | Siddiqui 1'; Marma 34'; Prity 63'; Kisku 90+5'127 | Report | Noora 42'; Fazla 57' | Stadium: Jawaharlal Nehru Stadium; Attendance: 127; Referee: Rachana Kamani (India) |

== Record ==
=== By competition ===
| Competition | Played | Won | Drawn | Lost | For | Against | Diff | Win % | Loss % |
|---|---|---|---|---|---|---|---|---|---|
| FIFA Women's World Cup | − | − | − | − | − | − | − | − | − |
| FIFA Women's World Cup qualification | − | − | − | − | − | − | − | − | − |
| AFC Women's Asian Cup | − | − | − | − | − | − | − | − | − |
| AFC Women's Asian Cup Qualification | 6 | 0 | 0 | 6 | 0 | 30 | −30 | 0% | 100% |
| South Asian Women's Football Tournament | 3 | 0 | 1 | 2 | 3 | 10 | −7 | 0% | 67% |
| Summer Olympics | − | − | − | − | − | − | − | − | − |
| Summer Olympics Qualification | 3 | 0 | 0 | 3 | 0 | 20 | −20 | 0% | 100% |
| AFF Women's Championship | 2 | 0 | 0 | 2 | 0 | 31 | −31 | 0% | 100% |
| International Friendlies | 9 | 3 | 2 | 4 | 10 | 19 | −9 | 33% | 44% |
| Total | 23 | 3 | 3 | 17 | 13 | 110 | −97 | 13% | 74% |

=== By venue ===
| Venue | Played | Won | Drawn | Lost | For | Against | Diff | Win % | Loss % |
|---|---|---|---|---|---|---|---|---|---|
| Home | 7 | 3 | 1 | 3 | 6 | 14 | −8 | 42.85% | 42.85% |
| Away | 33 | 2 | 4 | 27 | 12 | 143 | −131 | 6.06% | 81.82% |
| Neutral | 46 | 5 | 4 | 37 | 21 | 236 | −215 | 10.86% | 80.43% |
| Total | 89 | 10 | 9 | 70 | 42 | 410 | −368 | 11.23% | 78.65% |

=== By opponent ===
| Opponent | Played | Won | Drawn | Lost | For | Against | Diff | Win % | Loss % |
|---|---|---|---|---|---|---|---|---|---|
| (Afghanistan) Afghanistan | 3 | 1 | 2 | 0 | 4 | 3 | +1 | 33.33% | 0% |
| (Bahrain) Bahrain | 9 | 0 | 1 | 8 | 3 | 36 | −33 | 0% | 88.89% |
| (Bangladesh) Bangladesh | 5 | 0 | 0 | 5 | 3 | 18 | −15 | 0% | 100% |
| (Bhutan) Bhutan | 2 | 1 | 0 | 1 | 3 | 14 | −11 | 50% | 50% |
| (Chinese Taipei) Chinese Taipei | 1 | 0 | 0 | 1 | 0 | 7 | −7 | 0% | 100% |
| (Guam) Guam | 1 | 0 | 0 | 1 | 0 | 3 | −3 | 0% | 100% |
| (Hong Kong) Hong Kong | 1 | 0 | 0 | 1 | 0 | 4 | −4 | 0% | 100% |
| (Jordan) Jordan | 3 | 0 | 0 | 3 | 1 | 17 | −16 | 0% | 100% |
| (India) India | 9 | 0 | 1 | 8 | 1 | 79 | −78 | 0% | 88.89% |
| (Indonesia) Indonesia | 3 | 0 | 1 | 2 | 1 | 9 | −8 | 0% | 66.67% |
| (Kuwait) Kuwait | 2 | 1 | 1 | 0 | 4 | 2 | +2 | 50% | 0% |
| (Kyrgyzstan) Kyrgyzstan | 1 | 0 | 0 | 1 | 0 | 2 | −2 | 0% | 100% |
| (Mayotte) Mayotte | 1 | 0 | 1 | 0 | 1 | 1 | 0 | 0% | 0% |
| (Myanmar) Myanmar | 1 | 0 | 0 | 1 | 0 | 17 | −17 | 0% | 100% |
| (Nepal) Nepal | 6 | 0 | 0 | 6 | 0 | 36 | −36 | 0% | 100% |
| (Pakistan) Pakistan | 3 | 0 | 0 | 3 | 1 | 12 | −11 | 0% | 100% |
| (Palestine) Palestine | 2 | 0 | 0 | 2 | 1 | 6 | −5 | 0% | 100% |
| (Qatar) Qatar | 3 | 2 | 0 | 1 | 5 | 4 | +1 | 66.67% | 33.33% |
| (Saudi Arabia) Saudi Arabia | 1 | 0 | 0 | 1 | 0 | 2 | −2 | 0% | 100% |
| (Seychelles) Seychelles | 3 | 1 | 0 | 2 | 2 | 8 | −6 | 33.33% | 66.67% |
| (Singapore) Singapore | 3 | 0 | 0 | 3 | 0 | 9 | −9 | 0% | 100% |
| (South Korea) South Korea | 2 | 0 | 0 | 2 | 0 | 21 | −21 | 0% | 100% |
| (Sri Lanka) Sri Lanka | 7 | 3 | 0 | 4 | 9 | 12 | −3 | 42.85% | 57.14% |
| (Tajikistan) Tajikistan | 1 | 0 | 0 | 1 | 0 | 4 | −4 | 0% | 100% |
| (Thailand) Thailand | 2 | 0 | 0 | 2 | 0 | 19 | −19 | 0% | 100% |
| (United Arab Emirates) Arab Emirates | 8 | 1 | 2 | 5 | 3 | 12 | −9 | 12.5% | 62.5% |
| (Uzbekistan) Uzbekistan | 2 | 0 | 0 | 2 | 0 | 11 | −11 | 0% | 100% |
| (Vietnam) Vietnam | 4 | 0 | 0 | 4 | 0 | 42 | −42 | 0% | 100% |
| Total | 89 | 10 | 9 | 70 | 42 | 410 | -368 | 11.23% | 78.65% |
