= Chinatsu Kira =

Japanese footballer

Chinatsu Kira 吉良 知夏
Personal information
- Full name: Chinatsu Kira
- Date of birth: July 5, 1991 (age 35)
- Place of birth: Usuki, Oita, Japan
- Height: 1.61 m (5 ft 3 1/2 in)
- Position: Forward

Team information
- Current team: SC Telstar
- Number: 10

Youth career
- 2007–2009: Kamimura Gakuen High School

Senior career*
Years	Team	Apps	(Gls)
2010–2020	Urawa Reds	140	(51)
2020–2021	Melbourne City	11	(1)
2021–2022	Orca Kamogawa	2	(0)
2023 Jan-June	SE AEM	8	(0)
2023 -	SC Telstar	11	(1)

International career
2008	Japan U-17	3	(4)
2014	Japan	12	(5)
Medal record
Urawa Reds
Winner	Nadeshiko League	2014
Runner-up	Nadeshiko League	2010
Runner-up	Nadeshiko League Cup	2010
Runner-up	Nadeshiko League Cup	2017
Runner-up	Empress's Cup	2010
Runner-up	Empress's Cup	2014
Representing Japan
AFC Women's Asian Cup
Gold medal – first place	2014 Vietnam
Asian Games
Silver medal – second place	2014 Incheon	Team
AFC U-19 Women's Championship
Silver medal – second place	2007 China
AFC U-16 Women's Championship
Silver medal – second place	2007 Malaysia
- * Club domestic league appearances and goals as of 26 December 2023

Chinatsu Kira (吉良 知夏, Kira Chinatsu; born July 5, 1991) is a Japanese footballer who plays as a forward. She plays for Japanese Nadeshiko League club Orca Kamogawa. She played for the Japanese national team.

== Club career ==
=== Urawa Reds ===
Kira was born in Usuki on July 5, 1991. After graduating from high school, she joined for Urawa Reds in 2010. She was selected Best Young Player awards in 2011 season.

=== Melbourne City ===
In December 2020, Kira joined Australian club Melbourne City to play for the first time outside of her home country.

=== Orca Kamogawa ===
In June 2021, Kira returned to Japan and signed with Nadeshiko League club Orca Kamogawa.

=== SE AEM ===
In January 2023, Kira signed with Liga F club SE AEM

=== SC Telstar VVNH ===
In August 2023, Kira signed with Eredivisie Vrouwen club SC Telstar VVNH. and became the first Japanese female player ever in Eredivisie Vrouwen.

== National team career ==
In August 2008, Kira was selected for the Japan U-17 national team for the 2008 U-17 World Cup. She played three games and scored four goals. On May 8, 2014, she debuted for the Japan national team against New Zealand. She was a member of Japan's squad for the 2014 Asian Cup and the 2014 Asian Games. Japan won the championship at the Asian Cup and second place at the Asian Games. She played 12 games and scored 5 goals for Japan in 2014.

== National team statistics ==
Japan national team
Year	Apps	Goals
2014	12	5
Total	12	5

== International goals ==
No.	Date	Venue	Opponent	Score	Result	Competition
1.	18 May 2014	Gò Đậu Stadium, Thủ Dầu Một, Vietnam	Jordan	1–0	7–0	2014 AFC Women's Asian Cup
2.	18 May 2014	Gò Đậu Stadium, Thủ Dầu Một, Vietnam	Jordan	7–0	7–0	2014 AFC Women's Asian Cup
3.	18 September 2014	Incheon Namdong Asiad Rugby Field, Incheon, South Korea	Jordan	8–0	12–0	2014 Asian Games
4.	18 September 2014	Incheon Namdong Asiad Rugby Field, Incheon, South Korea	Jordan	9–0	12–0	2014 Asian Games
5.	22 September 2014	Incheon Munhak Stadium, Incheon, South Korea	Chinese Taipei	2–0	3–0	2014 Asian Games

== Honours ==
Japan

Winner

- AFC Women's Asian Cup: 2014
