= Football at the 2014 Asian Games – Women's tournament =

Women at the 2014 Asian Games
- Venues: Namdong Asiad Rugby Field; Munhak Stadium; Wa~ Stadium; Goyang Stadium; Hwaseong Stadium; Incheon Football Stadium
- Dates: 14 September – 1 October
- Competitors: 198 from 11 nations

Medalists
gold medal	North Korea
silver medal	Japan
bronze medal	South Korea

The women's football tournament at the 2014 Asian Games was held in Incheon and three other cities in South Korea from September 14 to October 1, 2014. The opening match was played 5 days prior to the opening ceremony. In this tournament, 11 teams participated in women's competition.

North Korea won the gold medal after defeating the title holder; Japan in the final with 3–1 score. The bronze medal was won by the host, South Korea after defeating Vietnam 3–0.

== Venues ==
Incheon
Munhak Stadium	Incheon Football Stadium	Namdong Asiad Rugby Field
Capacity: 49,084	Capacity: 20,891	Capacity: 5,078
Goyang	Ansan	Hwaseong
Goyang Stadium	Wa~ Stadium	Hwaseong Stadium
Capacity: 41,311	Capacity: 35,000	Capacity: 35,270

== Results ==
All times are Korea Standard Time (UTC+09:00)

=== First round ===
==== Group A ====
Pos	Team	Pld	W	D	L	GF	GA	GD	Pts
1	South Korea	3	3	0	0	28	0	+28	9
2	Thailand	3	2	0	1	20	5	+15	6
3	India	3	1	0	2	15	20	−5	3
4	Maldives	3	0	0	3	0	38	−38	0

Source: RSSSF
14 September
14:00

India	15–0	Maldives
Malik 5', 21', 26', 80', 88'; K. Devi 18', 23', 31', 45+2', 65'; N. Devi 20', 45+1'; L.A. Devi 53'; O.B. Devi 55'; I. Devi 90+4'	Report

Namdong Asiad Rugby Field, Incheon
Referee: Nami Imaizumi (Japan)

14 September
20:00

South Korea	5–0	Thailand
Jung Seol-bin 11'; Park Hee-young 25'; Yoo Young-a 60'; Jeon Ga-eul 80'; Choe Yu-ri 90+3'

Namdong Asiad Rugby Field, Incheon
Referee: Wang Jia (China)

17 September
14:00

Thailand	10–0	Maldives
Romyen 12', 24', 42'; Sornsai 23', 40', 45+2', 76'; Boothduang 33'; Srimanee 58'; Seesraum 63'

Namdong Asiad Rugby Field, Incheon
Referee: Kate Jacewicz (Australia)

17 September
20:00

South Korea	10–0	India
Jeon Ga-eul 7', 40', 61' (pen.); Yoo Young-a 9', 45', 63', 65'; Park Hee-young 36'; Jung Seol-bin 49', 79'

Namdong Asiad Rugby Field, Incheon
Referee: Fusako Kajiyama (Japan)

21 September
17:00

Thailand	10–0	India
Romyen 8', 9', 16', 39'; Sungngoen 24' (pen.), 27', 28', 35'; Sornsai 47'; Seesraum 90+2'

Namdong Asiad Rugby Field, Incheon
Referee: Mai Hoàng Trang (Vietnam)

21 September
17:00

Maldives	0–13	South Korea
		Jung Seol-bin 9'; Leeza 24' (o.g.); Lee So-dam 33' (pen.); Song Su-ran 36'; Park Hee-young 38'; Shin Dam-yeong 61'; Jeon Ga-eul 62'; Kwon Hah-nul 66', 84'; Yoo Young-a 69', 82'; Cho So-hyun 75'; Choe Yu-ri 88'

Munhak Stadium, Incheon
Referee: Li Juan (China)

==== Group B ====
Pos	Team	Pld	W	D	L	GF	GA	GD	Pts
1	Japan	3	2	1	0	15	0	+15	7
2	China	3	2	1	0	9	0	+9	7
3	Chinese Taipei	3	0	1	2	2	9	−7	1
4	Jordan	3	0	1	2	2	19	−17	1

Source: RSSSF
15 September
14:00

Jordan	2–2	Chinese Taipei
Al-Naber 45+7'; Jbarah 49'		Lin Ya-han 15'; Wang Hsiang-huei 26'

Namdong Asiad Rugby Field, Incheon
Referee: Shiva Yari (Iran)

15 September
20:00

Japan	0–0	China

Namdong Asiad Rugby Field, Incheon
Referee: Kim Sook-hee (South Korea)

18 September
14:00

China	4–0	Chinese Taipei
Han Peng 6'; Yang Li 12'; Zhang Rui 37'; Ma Jun 46'

Namdong Asiad Rugby Field, Incheon
Referee: Maria Rebello (India)

18 September
20:00

Japan	12–0	Jordan
Kawasumi 5', 81'; Sugasawa 12', 39', 41'; Sakaguchi 20', 32', 71'; Abu-Kasheh 36' (o.g.); Kira 44', 49'; Miyama 60'

Namdong Asiad Rugby Field, Incheon
Referee: Mai Hoàng Trang (Vietnam)

22 September
20:00

Chinese Taipei	0–3	Japan
		Sakaguchi 3'; Kira 32'; Kawasumi 85'

Munhak Stadium, Incheon
Referee: Kate Jacewicz (Australia)

22 September
20:00

China	5–0	Jordan
Yang Li 10', 13', 26', 42'; Li Dongna 36'

Namdong Asiad Rugby Field, Incheon
Referee: Kim Sook-hee (South Korea)

==== Group C ====
Pos	Team	Pld	W	D	L	GF	GA	GD	Pts
1	North Korea	2	2	0	0	10	0	+10	6
2	Vietnam	2	1	0	1	5	5	0	3
3	Hong Kong	2	0	0	2	0	10	−10	0

Source: RSSSF
16 September
17:00

North Korea	5–0	Vietnam
Kim Yun-mi 5', 10'; Kim Un-ju 21' (pen.); Ri Ye-gyong 41'; Jong Yu-ri 84' (pen.)

Namdong Asiad Rugby Field, Incheon
Referee: Li Juan (China)

20 September
17:00

Hong Kong	0–5	North Korea
		Wi Jong-sim 8'; Ri Ye-gyong 57', 64'; Ho Un-byol 67'; Ra Un-sim 83'

Namdong Asiad Rugby Field, Incheon
Referee: Kate Jacewicz (Australia)

23 September
17:00

Vietnam	5–0	Hong Kong
Wong So Han 4' (o.g.); Nguyễn Thị Tuyết Dung 14'; Nguyễn Thị Xuyến 45+1' (pen.); Nguyễn Thị Minh Nguyệt 69'; Phạm Hải Yến 80'

Namdong Asiad Rugby Field, Incheon
Referee: Fusako Kajiyama (Japan)

==== Third-placed teams ====
Pos	Team	Pld	W	D	L	GF	GA	GD	Pts
1	Chinese Taipei	2	0	0	2	0	7	−7	0
2	Hong Kong	2	0	0	2	0	10	−10	0
3	India	2	0	0	2	0	20	−20	0

Source: RSSSF

=== Knockout round ===
Quarterfinals
26 September
South Korea	1
Chinese Taipei	0
26 September
North Korea	1
China	0
26 September
Japan	9
Hong Kong	0
26 September
Thailand	1
Vietnam	2

Semifinals
29 September
South Korea	1
North Korea	2
29 September
Japan	3
Vietnam	0

Gold medal match
1 October
North Korea	3
Japan	1
Bronze medal match
1 October
South Korea	3
Vietnam	0

==== Quarterfinals ====
26 September
16:00

North Korea	1–0	China
Ho Un-byol 73'

Wa~ Stadium, Ansan
Referee: Nami Imaizumi (Japan)

26 September
16:00

Thailand	1–2	Vietnam
Romyen 51'		Nguyễn Thị Liễu 53'; Nguyễn Thị Tuyết Dung 67'

Goyang Stadium, Goyang
Referee: Kim Sook-hee (South Korea)

26 September
20:00

South Korea	1–0	Chinese Taipei
Jeon Ga-eul 73'

Munhak Stadium, Incheon
Referee: Fusako Kajiyama (Japan)

26 September
20:00

Japan	9–0	Hong Kong
Masuya 3', 26'; He Ying 10' (o.g.); Nakajima 14'; Iwashimizu 49'; Kiryu 60', 81'; Takase 66'; Sugasawa 76'

Hwaseong Stadium, Hwaseong
Referee: Li Juan (China)

==== Semifinals ====
29 September
17:00

Japan	3–0	Vietnam
Sakaguchi 24'; Osafune 53'; Sugasawa 74'

Football Stadium, Incheon
Referee: Maria Rebello (India)

29 September
20:00

South Korea	1–2	North Korea
Jung Seol-bin 12'		Ri Ye-gyong 36'; Ho Un-byol 90+3'

Munhak Stadium, Incheon
Referee: Wang Jia (China)

==== Bronze medal match ====
1 October
17:00

South Korea	3–0	Vietnam
Kwon Hah-nul 55'; Jung Seol-bin 57'; Park Hee-young 67'

Football Stadium, Incheon
Referee: Nami Imaizumi (Japan)

==== Gold medal match ====
1 October
20:00

North Korea	3–1	Japan
Kim Yun-mi 12'; Ra Un-sim 52'; Ho Un-byol 87'		Miyama 56'

Munhak Stadium, Incheon
Referee: Kate Jacewicz (Australia)

== Goalscorers ==
8 goals

- Nisa Romyen (THA)

7 goals

- Yoo Young-a (KOR)

6 goals

- Jeon Ga-eul (KOR)
- Jung Seol-bin (KOR)

5 goals

- Yang Li (CHN)
- Kamala Devi (IND)
- Sasmita Malik (IND)
- Mizuho Sakaguchi (JPN)
- Yuika Sugasawa (JPN)
- Pitsamai Sornsai (THA)

4 goals

- Park Hee-young (KOR)
- Ho Un-byol (PRK)
- Ri Ye-gyong (PRK)
- Kanjana Sungngoen (THA)

3 goals

- Nahomi Kawasumi (JPN)
- Chinatsu Kira (JPN)
- Kwon Hah-nul (KOR)
- Kim Yun-mi (PRK)

2 goals

- Ngangom Bala Devi (IND)
- Nanase Kiryu (JPN)
- Rika Masuya (JPN)
- Aya Miyama (JPN)
- Choe Yu-ri (KOR)
- Ra Un-sim (PRK)
- Naphat Seesraum (THA)
- Nguyễn Thị Tuyết Dung (VIE)

1 goal

- Han Peng (CHN)
- Li Dongna (CHN)
- Ma Jun (CHN)
- Zhang Rui (CHN)
- Irom Prameshwori Devi (IND)
- Loitongbam Ashalata Devi (IND)
- Oinam Bembem Devi (IND)
- Stephanie Al-Naber (JOR)
- Maysa Jbarah (JOR)
- Azusa Iwashimizu (JPN)
- Emi Nakajima (JPN)
- Kana Osafune (JPN)
- Megumi Takase (JPN)
- Cho So-hyun (KOR)
- Lee So-dam (KOR)
- Shin Dam-yeong (KOR)
- Song Su-ran (KOR)
- Jong Yu-ri (PRK)
- Kim Un-ju (PRK)
- Wi Jong-sim (PRK)
- Wilaiporn Boothduang (THA)
- Orathai Srimanee (THA)
- Lin Ya-han (TPE)
- Wang Hsiang-huei (TPE)
- Nguyễn Thị Liễu (VIE)
- Nguyễn Thị Minh Nguyệt (VIE)
- Nguyễn Thị Xuyến (VIE)
- Phạm Hải Yến (VIE)

1 own goal

- He Ying (HKG) (against JPN)
- Wong So Han (HKG) (against VIE)
- Ala'a Abu-Kasheh (JOR) (against JPN)
- Aminath Leeza (MDV) (against KOR)

== Final standing ==
Rank	Team	Pld	W	D	L	GF	GA	GD	Pts
1st place, gold medalist(s)	North Korea	5	5	0	0	16	2	+14	15
2nd place, silver medalist(s)	Japan	6	4	1	1	28	3	+25	13
3rd place, bronze medalist(s)	South Korea	6	5	0	1	33	2	+31	15
4	Vietnam	5	2	0	3	7	12	−5	6
5	China	4	2	1	1	9	1	+8	7
6	Thailand	4	2	0	2	21	7	+14	6
7	Chinese Taipei	4	0	1	3	2	10	−8	1
8	Hong Kong	3	0	0	3	0	19	−19	0
9	India	3	1	0	2	15	20	−5	3
10	Jordan	3	0	1	2	2	19	−17	1
11	Maldives	3	0	0	3	0	38	−38	0
