= 2014 Algarve Cup =

International women's football tournament

Tournament details
- Host country: Portugal
- City: Algarve
- Dates: 5–12 March
- Teams: 12 (from 3 confederations)
- Venues: 5 (in 5 host cities)

Final positions
- Champions: Germany (3rd title)
- Runners-up: Japan
- Third place: Iceland
- Fourth place: Sweden

Tournament statistics
- Matches played: 24
- Goals scored: 68 (2.83 per match)
- Top scorer(s): (Germany) Dzsenifer Marozsán (Germany) Anja Mittag (Russia) Elena Morozova (Iceland) Harpa Porsteinsdóttir (3 goals)

The 2014 Algarve Cup was the 21st edition of the Algarve Cup, an invitational women's football tournament held annually in Portugal. It took place between 5–12 March 2014.

== Format ==
The twelve invited teams are split into three groups that played a round-robin tournament.

Since the expansion to 12 teams 13 years ago, the Algarve Cup format has been as follows: Groups A and B, containing the strongest ranked teams, are the only ones in contention to win the title. The group A and B winners contest the final - to win the Algarve Cup. The runners-up play for third place, and those that finish third in the groups play for fifth place. The teams in Group C played for places 7–12. The winner of Group C played the team that finished fourth in Group A or B (whichever has the better record) for seventh place. The Group C runner-up played the team who finishes last in Group A or B (with the worse record) for ninth place. The third and fourth-placed teams in Group C played for the eleventh place.

Points awarded in the group stage followed the standard formula of three points for a win, one point for a draw and zero points for a loss. In the case of two teams being tied on the same number of points in a group, their head-to-head result determined the higher place.

== Teams ==
Listed are the confirmed teams.

Team	FIFA Rankings (December 2013)
United States	1
Germany	2
Japan	3
Sweden	6
Norway	8
North Korea	10
Denmark	13
China	18
Iceland	19
Russia	21
Austria	29
Portugal (hosts)	41

== Match officials ==
The appointed match officials are.

- Teodora Albon (Romania)
- Melissa Borjas (Honduras)
- Sheena Dickson (Canada)
- Cristina Dorcioman (Romania)
- Stéphanie Frappart (France)
- Rita Gani (Malaysia)
- Riem Hussein (Germany)
- Yeimy Martinèz (Colombia)
- Efthalia Mitsi (Greece)
- Olga Miranda (Paraguay)
- Therese Neguel (Cameroon)
- Casey Reibelt (Australia)
- Wang Jia (China)

== Group stage ==
All times are local (WET/UTC+0). The schedule was announced in February 2014.

=== Group A ===
Team	Pld	W	D	L	GF	GA	GD	Pts
Germany	3	3	0	0	9	1	+8	9
Iceland	3	2	0	1	3	6	−3	6
China	3	1	0	2	1	2	−1	3
Norway	3	0	0	3	2	6	−4	0

5 March 2014
16:00

Norway	0–1	China
	Report	Yang Li 75'

Estádio Municipal, Vila Real de Santo António
Attendance: 150
Referee: Yeimy Martinèz (Colombia)
5 March 2014
16:00

Germany	5–0	Iceland
Šašić 7', 45+1' (pen.); Marozsán 23'; Goeßling 59'; Popp 64'	Report

Estádio Municipal, Albufeira
Attendance: 400
Referee: Stéphanie Frappart (France)

7 March 2014
15:00

Norway	1–2	Iceland
Mykjåland 82'	Report	Edvardsdottir 48'; Þorsteinsdóttir 86'

Municipal Stadium, Lagos
Referee: Teodora Albon (Romania)
7 March 2014
17:10

Germany	1–0	China
Mittag 79'	Report

Estádio Municipal, Albufeira
Attendance: 500
Referee: Sheena Dickson (Canada)

10 March 2014
18:30

China	0–1	Iceland
	Report	90+1' (o.g.)

Estádio Municipal, Lagos
Referee: Rita Gani (Malaysia)
10 March 2014
18:30

Norway	1–3	Germany
Mykjåland 2' (pen.)	Report	Laudehr 12'; Mittag 31'; Marozsán 55'

Estádio Municipal, Albufeira
Attendance: 400
Referee: Cristina Dorcioman (Romania)

=== Group B ===
Team	Pld	W	D	L	GF	GA	GD	Pts
Japan	3	2	1	0	4	2	+2	7
Sweden	3	2	0	1	4	2	+2	6
Denmark	3	1	0	2	5	6	−1	3
United States	3	0	1	2	4	7	−3	1

5 March 2014
13:45

Japan	1–1	United States
Miyama 82'	Report	Leroux 76'

Stadium Bela Vista, Parchal
Attendance: 500
Referee: Efthalia Mitsi (Greece)
5 March 2014
19:00

Sweden	2–0	Denmark
Asllani 15'; Rubensson 18'	Report

Estádio Municipal, Albufeira
Referee: Casey Reibelt (Australia)

7 March 2014
14:30

Sweden	1–0	United States
Schelin 23'	Report

Estádio Municipal, Albufeira
Attendance: 2,000
Referee: Yeimy Martinèz (Colombia)
7 March 2014
15:10

Japan	1–0	Denmark
Iwabuchi 43'	Report

Stadium Bela Vista, Parchal
Referee: Cristina Dorcioman (Romania)

10 March 2014
15:40

Japan	2–1	Sweden
Ōgimi 48'; Miyama 89' (pen.)	Report	Sembrant 41'

Estádio Algarve, Faro
Referee: Teodora Albon (Romania)
10 March 2014
15:40

United States	3–5	Denmark
Press 59'; Leroux 65'; Rapinoe 68'	Report	Veje 24'; Nadim 35'; S. Sørensen 39'; Rasmussen 62'; K. Nielsen 90+2'

Estádio Municipal, Albufeira
Attendance: 750
Referee: Riem Hussein (Germany)

=== Group C ===
Team	Pld	W	D	L	GF	GA	GD	Pts
North Korea	3	3	0	0	6	1	+5	9
Russia	3	1	0	2	6	6	0	3
Austria	3	1	0	2	5	7	−2	3
Portugal	3	1	0	2	4	7	−3	3

5 March 2014
16:00

Russia	1–2	North Korea
Morozova 90+2'	Report	Jong Yu-ri 33'; Ra Un-sim 90'

Estádio Municipal, Lagos
Referee: Therese Neguel (Cameroon)
5 March 2014
16:00

Portugal	3–2	Austria
Neto 15', 61'; Silva 27'	Report	Zadrazil 33'; Schnaderbeck 40'

Stadium Bela Vista, Parchal
Referee: Riem Hussein (Germany)

7 March 2014
18:00

Portugal	1–3	Russia
Mendes 11'	Report	Pantyukhina 54', 76'; Korovkina 60'

Stadium Bela Vista, Parchal
Referee: Rita Gani (Malaysia)
7 March 2014
18:00

Austria	0–2	North Korea
	Report	Kim Un-ju 57'; Ho Un-byol 72'

Estádio Municipal, Lagos
Referee: Wang Jia (China)

10 March 2014
18:30

Portugal	0–2	North Korea
	Report	Ho Un-byol 39'; Ra Un-sim 54'

Estádio Algarve, Faro
Referee: Sheena Dickson (Canada)
10 March 2014
18:30

Austria	3–2	Russia
Makas 19'; Prohaska 30'; Burger 88'	Report	Morozova 18', 62' (pen.)

Estádio Municipal, Vila Real de Santo António
Referee: Yeimy Martinèz (Colombia)

== Placement play-offs ==
=== Eleventh place match ===
12 March 2014
11:00

Austria	2–1	Portugal
Prohaska 2'; Zadrazil 27'	Report	Silva 72'

Estádio Algarve, Faro
Referee: Wang Jia (China)

=== Ninth place match ===
12 March 2014
14:30

Russia	1–0	Norway
Sochneva 88'	Report

Stadium Bela Vista, Parchal
Referee: Rita Gani (Malaysia)

=== Seventh place match ===
12 March 2014
11:00

North Korea	0–3	United States
	Report	Wambach 11', 58'; O'Reilly 88'

Stadium Bela Vista, Parchal
Attendance: 250
Referee: Stéphanie Frappart (France)

=== Fifth place match ===
12 March 2014
11:00

China	1–1	Denmark
Yang Li 7'	Report	Troelsgaard 87' (pen.)
Penalties
	5–4

Estádio Municipal, Albufeira
Referee: Sheena Dickson (Canada)

=== Third place match ===
12 March 2014
11:00

Iceland	2–1	Sweden
Þorsteinsdóttir 27', 31'	Report	Göransson 89'

Estádio Municipal, Albufeira
Referee: Casey Reibelt (Australia)

=== Final ===
12 March 2014
14:10

Germany	3–0	Japan
Keßler 46'; Mittag 50'; Marozsán 61'	Report

Estádio Algarve, Faro
Attendance: 600
Referee: Efthalia Mitsi (Greece)

== Final standings ==
Rank	Team
1st place, gold medalist(s)	Germany
2nd place, silver medalist(s)	Japan
3rd place, bronze medalist(s)	Iceland
4	Sweden
5	China
6	Denmark
7	United States
8	North Korea
9	Russia
10	Norway
11	Austria
12	Portugal

2014 Algarve Cup

Germany
Third title
