= Ri Ye-gyong =

North Korean footballer

Personal information
- Date of birth: 26 October 1989 (age 37)
- Place of birth: Pyongyang, North Korea
- Position: Midfielder

Senior career*
| Years | Team | Apps | (Gls) |
| 2012 | Amrokkang | | |

International career
| 2012 | North Korea | 25 (?) | (9) |
- * Club domestic league appearances and goals

- Ri Ye-gyong
- Hangul: 리예경
- RR: Ri Yegyeong
- MR: Ri Yegyŏng

Ri Ye-gyong (born 26 October 1989 in Pyongyang) is a North Korean football midfielder who played for the North Korea women's national football team at the 2012 Summer Olympics. At the club level, she played for Amrokkang.

== International goals ==
| No. | Date | Venue | Opponent | Score | Result | Competition |
|---|---|---|---|---|---|---|
| 1. | 12 June 2012 | Stadionul CNAF, Mogoșoaia, Romania | Romania | 1–1 | 4–2 | Friendly |
| 2. | 12 June 2012 | Stadionul CNAF, Mogoșoaia, Romania | Romania | 2–1 | 4–2 | Friendly |
| 3. | 14 June 2012 | Centrul National De Fotbal Buftea, Mogoșoaia, Romania | Romania | 1–0 | 5–1 | Friendly |
| 4. | 14 June 2012 | Centrul National De Fotbal Buftea, Mogoșoaia, Romania | Romania | 3–0 | 5–1 | Friendly |
| 5. | 14 June 2012 | Centrul National De Fotbal Buftea, Mogoșoaia, Romania | Romania | 4–0 | 5–1 | Friendly |
| 6. | 19 July 2012 | Stebonheath Park, Llanelli, Wales | Wales | 3–1 | 4–2 | Friendly |
| 7. | 16 September 2014 | Namdong Asiad Rugby Field, Incheon, South Korea | Vietnam | 4–0 | 5–0 | 2014 Asian Games |
| 8. | 20 September 2014 | Namdong Asiad Rugby Field, Incheon, South Korea | Hong Kong | 2–0 | 5–0 | 2014 Asian Games |
| 9. | 20 September 2014 | Namdong Asiad Rugby Field, Incheon, South Korea | Hong Kong | 3–0 | 5–0 | 2014 Asian Games |
| 10. | 29 October 2014 | Munhak Stadium, Incheon, South Korea | South Korea | 1–1 | 1–1 | 2014 Asian Games |
| 11. | 1 August 2015 | Wuhan Sports Center Stadium, Wuhan, China | Japan | 1–0 | 4–2 | 2015 EAFF Women's East Asian Cup |
| 12. | 1 August 2015 | Wuhan Sports Center Stadium, Wuhan, China | Japan | 2–1 | 4–2 | 2015 EAFF Women's East Asian Cup |

== See also ==
- North Korea at the 2012 Summer Olympics
