= Hisui Haza =

Japanese footballer (born 1996)

Hisui Haza 羽座 妃粋
Personal information
- Date of birth: March 16, 1996 (age 30)
- Place of birth: Nishinomiya, Japan
- Height: 1.67 m (5 ft 6 in)
- Position: Defender

Team information
- Current team: INAC Kobe Leonessa
- Number: 14

Youth career
- 2011–2013: Hinomoto Gakuen High School
- 2014–2017: Nippon Sport Science University

Senior career*
Years	Team	Apps	(Gls)
2018–2019	INAC Kobe Leonessa	10	(1)
2019–2021	AEM	39	(6)
2021–	INAC Kobe Leonessa	0	(0)
Total		49	(7)

International career
2016	Japan U-20	2	(0)
2014	Japan	4	(0)
Medal record
INAC Kobe Leonessa
Runner-up	Nadeshiko League	2018
Runner-up	Nadeshiko League Cup	2018
Runner-up	Empress's Cup	2018
Representing Japan
Asian Games
Silver medal – second place	2014 Incheon	Team
FIFA U-20 Women's World Cup
Bronze medal – third place	2016 Papua New Guinea
AFC U-19 Women's Championship
Gold medal – first place	2015 China
- * Club domestic league appearances and goals as of August 4, 2019

Hisui Haza (羽座 妃粋, Haza Hisui; born March 16, 1996) is a Japanese footballer who plays as a defender. She plays for INAC Kobe Leonessa in the WE League and for the Japan national team.

== Club career ==
Haza was born in Nishinomiya on March 16, 1996. After graduating from Nippon Sport Science University, she joined her local club INAC Kobe Leonessa in 2018. In August 2019, she moved to Spanish club SE AEM.

== National team career ==
On September 13, 2014, when Haza was 18 years old, she debuted for Japan national team against Ghana. She was a member of Japan for 2014 Asian Games, where she played three games and helped Japan to a second-place finish. She played four games for Japan in 2014. In November 2016, she was selected for Japan U-20 national team for the 2016 U-20 World Cup and Japan won third place.

== National team statistics ==
Japan national team
Year	Apps	Goals
2014	4	0
Total	4	0
