= Rie Usui =

Japanese footballer

Rie Usui 臼井 理恵
Personal information
- Full name: Rie Usui
- Date of birth: December 28, 1989 (age 36)
- Place of birth: Tokyo, Japan
- Height: 1.70 m (5 ft 7 in)
- Position: Defender

Youth career
- 2005–2007: Kichijo Women's High School
- 2008–2011: Waseda University

Senior career*
Years	Team	Apps	(Gls)
2013	Sfida Setagaya FC	17	(4)
2014–2016	Urawa Reds	44	(1)
2017–2018	Nojima Stella Kanagawa Sagamihara	14	(0)
Total		75	(5)

International career
2014	Japan	6	(0)
Medal record
Urawa Reds
Winner	Nadeshiko League	2014
Runner-up	Empress's Cup	2014
Nojima Stella Kanagawa Sagamihara
Runner-up	Empress's Cup	2017
Representing Japan
Asian Games
Silver medal – second place	2014 Incheon	Team
- * Club domestic league appearances and goals as of December 31, 2018

Rie Usui (臼井 理恵, Usui Rie; born December 28, 1989) is a Japanese former football player. She played for Nojima Stella Kanagawa Sagamihara. She played for Japan national team.

== Club career ==
Usui was born in Tokyo on December 28, 1989. After graduating from Waseda University, she retired from playing career. However, after 1 year blank, she restarted playing career at Sfida Setagaya FC in 2013. She moved to Urawa Reds in 2014. In 2017, she moved to Nojima Stella Kanagawa Sagamihara.

== National team career ==
On September 13, 2014, Usui debuted for Japan national team against Ghana. She played for Japan at 2014 Asian Games and Japan won 2nd place. She played 6 games for Japan in 2014.

== National team statistics ==
Japan national team
Year	Apps	Goals
2014	6	0
Total	6	0
