= Nguyễn Thị Xuyến =

Vietnamese footballer

Personal information
- Date of birth: 6 September 1987 (age 39)
- Place of birth: Đông Anh, Hanoi, Vietnam
- Height: 1.60 m (5 ft 3 in)
- Position: Defender

Senior career*
Years	Team	Apps	(Gls)
2004–2021	Hà Nội I	172	(9)

International career^{‡}
2011–2019	Vietnam	85	(5)
- * Club domestic league appearances and goals ‡ National team caps and goals as of 10:07, 22 March 2015 (UTC)

Nguyễn Thị Xuyến (born 6 September 1987) is a Vietnamese women's international footballer who plays as a defender. She is a member of the Vietnam women's national football team. She was part of the team at the 2014 AFC Women's Asian Cup.

== International goals ==
No.	Date	Venue	Opponent	Score	Result	Competition
1.	13 September 2012	Thống Nhất Stadium, Ho Chi Minh City, Vietnam	Singapore	10–0	10–0	2012 AFF Women's Championship
2.	22 May 2013	Bahrain National Stadium, Riffa, Bahrain	Bahrain	3–0	8–0	2014 AFC Women's Asian Cup qualification
3.	24 May 2013	Bahrain National Stadium, Riffa, Bahrain	Kyrgyzstan	4–0	12–0	2014 AFC Women's Asian Cup qualification
4.	23 September 2014	Namdong Asiad Rugby Field, Incheon, South Korea	Hong Kong	3–0	5–0	2014 Asian Games
5.	26 July 2016	Mandalarthiri Stadium, Mandalay, Myanmar	Singapore	1–0	14–0	2016 AFF Women's Championship
