= Jun Min-kyung =

South Korean footballer (born 1985)

Personal information
- Date of birth: 16 January 1985 (age 41)
- Place of birth: South Korea
- Height: 1.72 m (5 ft 7 1/2 in)
- Position: Goalkeeper

Youth career
- Ulsan College

Senior career*
Years	Team	Apps	(Gls)
2004-2017	Daekyo Kangaroos WFC		

International career^{‡}
2004–2015	Korea Republic	45	(0)
Medal record
Asian Games
Bronze medal – third place	2010 Guangzhou	Team
Bronze medal – third place	2014 Incheon	Team
- * Club domestic league appearances and goals ‡ National team caps and goals as of 18:45, 23 June 2015 (UTC)

- Jun Min-kyung
- Hangul: 전민경
- RR: Jeon Mingyeong
- MR: Chŏn Min'gyŏng

Jun Min-kyung (Korean: 전민경, Korean pronunciation: [tɕʌn.min.ɡjʌŋ]; born 16 January 1985) is a South Korean women's former footballer who played as a goalkeeper. She has also represented the South Korean national team.
