= Song Su-ran =

South Korean footballer

Song Su-ran 송수란
Personal information
- Date of birth: 7 September 1990 (age 36)
- Place of birth: Imsil, North Jeolla, South Korea
- Height: 1.69 m (5 ft 6 1/2 in)
- Position: Defender

Senior career*
Years	Team	Apps	(Gls)
2011-2013	Goyang Daekyo		
2014-2016	Daejeon Sportstoto		
2017-2019	Hwacheon KSPO		

International career^{‡}
2014–2015	South Korea	20	(1)
Medal record
Asian Games
Bronze medal – third place	2014 Incheon	Team
- * Club domestic league appearances and goals as of 5 June 2018 ‡ National team caps and goals as of 5 June 2018

Song Su-ran (Korean: 송수란, Korean pronunciation: [soŋ.su.ɾan]; born 7 September 1990) is a South Korean footballer who plays as a defender. She participated at the 2015 FIFA Women's World Cup.

== Early life ==
Song was born in Imsil County, North Jeolla Province. As a child she enjoyed art, but was encouraged to take up football by her father, who himself had dreamed of being an athlete. Her older brother and one of her sisters also played football, but did not pursue it as a career. Song played football at Samrye Girls' Middle School and Hanbyul High School before attending Yeungjin College.

== Club career ==
Song joined Goyang Daekyo, having been selected in the third round of the 2011 WK League new players' draft. In her first year with Daekyo, the team lifted the WK League trophy and also won the women's football competition at the National Sports Festival. In 2012, Song spent a brief spell on loan at Daejeon Sportstoto, before eventually making a permanent transfer to the club in 2014 after the expiration of her contract at Daekyo. Song moved to Hwacheon KSPO in 2017.

== International career ==
Song represented South Korea at the 2011 Summer Universiade in Shenzhen, China. She was called up to the senior team in 2014 and made her debut at the Cyprus Cup, where South Korea finished in third place.

Song played at the 2014 AFC Women's Asian Cup, where South Korea's fourth-place finish secured them a place at the 2015 FIFA Women's World Cup. She also played at the 2014 Asian Games in Incheon, where South Korea won the bronze medal.

She was named in the squad for the 2015 World Cup but did not play at the tournament, at which South Korea progressed to the Round of 16 for the first time.

== Style of play ==
Throughout her youth career, Song played as a forward, switching to defence while at college. She has played on both the left and right wings and is known for her work rate and accurate crossing. Song has also been praised for her determination and dedication to football, even pursuing a refereeing qualifiaction while regularly playing in the WK League.

== Career statistics ==
Scores and results list South Korea's goal tally first.

List of international goals scored by Song Su-ran
No.	Date	Venue	Opponent	Score	Result	Competition	Ref.
1.	21 September 2014	Munhak Stadium, Incheon, South Korea	Maldives	4–0	13–0	2014 Asian Games	

== Honours ==
=== Goyang Daekyo ===
- WK League champions: 2011, 2012
- National Sports Festival champions: 2011

=== South Korea ===
- Cyprus Women's Cup third place: 2014
- Asian Games Bronze medal: 2014
