= Aya Miyama =

Japanese footballer (born 1985)

Aya Miyama 宮間 あや
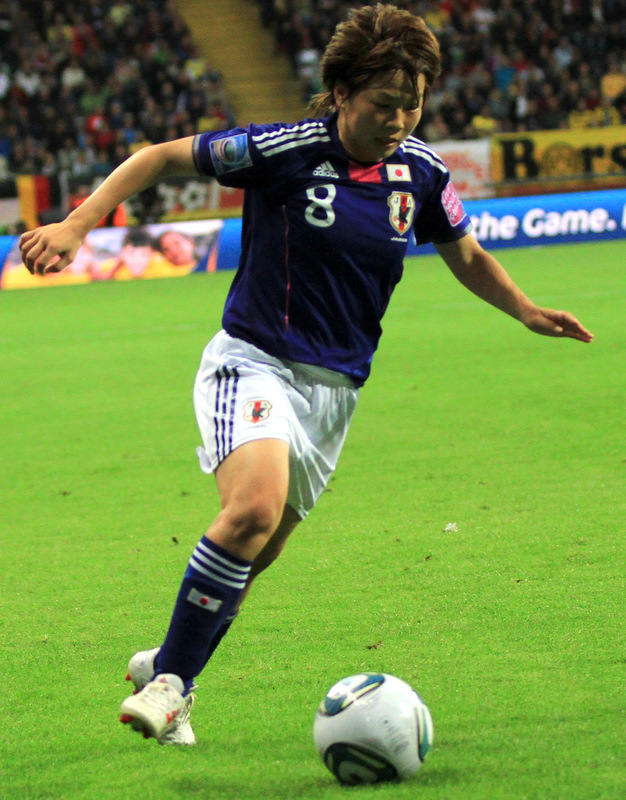
- Miyama playing in the 2011 World Cup

Personal information
- Full name: Aya Miyama
- Date of birth: 28 January 1985 (age 41)
- Place of birth: Oamishirasato, Chiba, Japan
- Height: 1.57 m (5 ft 2 in)
- Position: Midfielder

Senior career*
Years	Team	Apps	(Gls)
1999–2000	Nippon TV Beleza	6	(2)
2001–2008	Okayama Yunogo Belle	110	(62)
2009	Los Angeles Sol	20	(0)
2009	Okayama Yunogo Belle	6	(1)
2010	Saint Louis Athletica	5	(0)
2010	Atlanta Beat	17	(1)
2010–2016	Okayama Yunogo Belle	122	(48)
Total		286	(114)

International career
2003–2016	Japan	162	(38)
Medal record
Nippon TV Beleza
Winner	Nadeshiko League	2000
Runner-up	Nadeshiko League	1999
Winner	Nadeshiko League Cup	1999
Winner	Empress's Cup	2000
Okayama Yunogo Belle
Runner-up	Nadeshiko League Cup	2013
Runner-up	Empress's Cup	2006
Representing Japan
Olympic Games
Silver medal – second place	2012 London	Team
FIFA Women's World Cup
Gold medal – first place	2011 Germany
Silver medal – second place	2015 Canada
AFC Women's Asian Cup
Gold medal – first place	2014 Vietnam
Bronze medal – third place	2008 Vietnam
Bronze medal – third place	2010 China
Asian Games
Gold medal – first place	2010 Guangzhou	Team
Silver medal – second place	2006 Doha	Team
Silver medal – second place	2014 Incheon	Team
AFC U-19 Women's Championship
Gold medal – first place	2002 India
- * Club domestic league appearances and goals

Aya Miyama (宮間 あや, Miyama Aya; born 28 January 1985) is a Japanese former footballer who played for the Japan national team starting in 2003, and from 2012 to 2016 served as captain of the team. She appeared in four World Cups between 2003 and 2015, and was part of the team that won the 2011 World Cup for Japan. Miyama also led Japan to a silver medal at the 2012 Summer Olympics in London.

== Club career ==
=== Early career ===
Miyama was born in Ōamishirasato, Sanbu District, Chiba Prefecture, on 28 January 1985 . She started her career as a football player in the club her father founded. She later joined Nippon TV Beleza in 1999 after playing with their youth team, but when she was in eleventh grade, she left the team and went to the high school football club. Even among male players, she kept playing football.

Miyama joined L.League side Okayama Yunogo Belle in 2001, having received an invitation from Midori Honda, the coach.

=== WPS ===
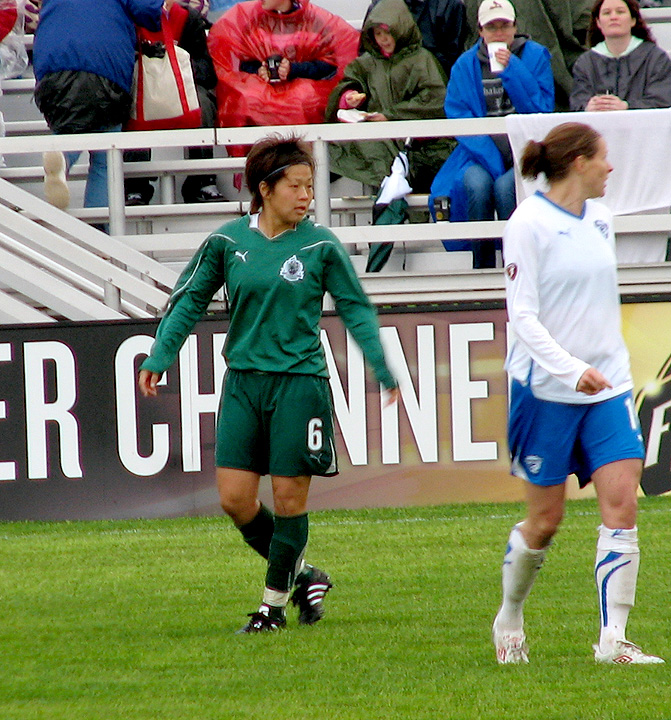
Aya Miyama (Left) playing for Saint Louis Athletica against the Boston Breakers. Kelly Smith is pictured on the right.

On 24 November 2008, Miyama was selected by the Los Angeles Sol of the U.S. Women's Professional Soccer (WPS) in the 2008 WPS International Draft, and joined Sol in 2009. In the 2009 Women's Professional Soccer season, she had 6 assists but no goals. When the Sol disbanded in early 2010, she was taken by Saint Louis Athletica. Miyama signed as a free agent with the Atlanta Beat on 10 June 2010.

=== Return to Japan ===
Miyama returned to Okayama Yunogo Belle in September 2010. She left the club at the end of the 2016 season.

== International career ==
At the 2007 World Cup held in China, Miyama performed brilliantly in Japan's match against England, scoring the team's two goals both from direct free kicks as they held on to a draw. In Japan's first group stage match of the 2011 World Cup, she scored the go-ahead goal in Japan's win against New Zealand from another free kick in the 68th minute, and was named Player of the Match.

At the 2011 World Cup in Germany, Miyama scored the winner – a curling free kick – to help Japan beat New Zealand, and netted Japan's first goal in the final against the USA. Miyama also scored Japan's first penalty of the eventual penalty shoot-out in the final which ended 2–2 after extra time. Her team won 3–1 in the penalty shoot-out, making them the first Asian team to win the World Cup. In the moment of victory, Miyama did not join her teammates in celebration, but instead went to the American players to hug and congratulate them. This has been reported both by Hope Solo and the Japanese media as evidence of Miyama's sportsmanship and respect for her opponents.

Miyama was named the AFC Women's Footballer of the Year in 2011, 2012 and 2015.

At the 2012 Summer Olympics, Miyama led Japan to the silver medal as captain. At the 2015 World Cup, she also captained the team and lost in the final to the USA. At the 2016 AFC Women's Olympic Qualifying Tournament, Japan failed to qualify for the 2016 Summer Olympics. Following the tournament, she retired from the national team. She played 162 matches and scored 38 goals for Japan.

== Career statistics ==
=== Club ===
As of 21 November 2015

Appearances and goals by club, season and competition
Club	Season	League		National cup		League cup		Other (Note: Includes 2009 Women's Professional Soccer Playoffs.)		Total	
Club	Season	Apps	Goals	Apps	Goals	Apps	Goals	Apps	Goals	Apps	Goals
Nippon TV Beleza	1999	0	0					–			
Nippon TV Beleza	2000	6	2			–		–			
Nippon TV Beleza	Total	6	2					–			
Okayama Yunogo Belle	2003	16	13	2	1	–		–		18	14
Okayama Yunogo Belle	2004	14	17			–		–			
Okayama Yunogo Belle	2005	21	8	4	4	–		–		25	12
Okayama Yunogo Belle	2006	17	6	4	0	–		–		21	16
Okayama Yunogo Belle	2007	21	9	2	0	0	0	–		23	9
Okayama Yunogo Belle	2008	21	9	2	1	–		–		23	10
Okayama Yunogo Belle	Total	110	62			0	0	–			
Los Angeles Sol	2009	20	0	–		–		1	0	21	0
Okayama Yunogo Belle	2009	6	1	2	2	–		–		8	3
Saint Louis Athletica	2010	5	0	–		–		–		5	0
Atlanta Beat	2010	17	1	–		–		–		17	1
Okayama Yunogo Belle	2010	7	4	2	0	0	0	–		9	4
Okayama Yunogo Belle	2011	16	9	3	1	–		–		19	10
Okayama Yunogo Belle	2012	18	5	2	2	4	2	–		24	9
Okayama Yunogo Belle	2013	18	6	3	1	10	9	–		31	16
Okayama Yunogo Belle	2014	28	15	2	1	–		–		30	16
Okayama Yunogo Belle	2015	24	6	2	1	–		–		26	7
Okayama Yunogo Belle	Total	111	45	14	6	14	11	–		139	62
Career total		275	111					1	0		

=== International ===
Appearances and goals by national team and year
National team	Year	Apps	Goals
Japan	2003	6	2
Japan	2004	1	2
Japan	2005	9	2
Japan	2006	17	3
Japan	2007	17	6
Japan	2008	18	4
Japan	2009	1	1
Japan	2010	17	2
Japan	2011	18	4
Japan	2012	16	3
Japan	2013	7	1
Japan	2014	17	4
Japan	2015	13	4
Japan	2016	5	0
Total		162	38

Scores and results list Japan's goal tally first, score column indicates score after each Miyama goal.

List of international goals scored by Aya Miyama
No.	Date	Venue	Opponent	Score	Result	Competition
1	9 June 2003	Rajamangala Stadium, Bangkok, Thailand	Philippines	13–0	15–0	2003 AFC Women's Championship
2	22 July 2003	Sendai Stadium, Sendai, Japan	South Korea	4–0	5–0	Friendly
3	18 December 2004	Nishigaoka Soccer Stadium, Tokyo, Japan	Chinese Taipei	2–0	11–0	Friendly
4	18 December 2004	Nishigaoka Soccer Stadium, Tokyo, Japan	Chinese Taipei	4–0	11–0	Friendly
5	29 March 2005	Miranda, Australia	Australia	1–2	1–2	Friendly
6	21 May 2005	Nishigaoka Soccer Stadium, Tokyo, Japan	New Zealand	5–0	6–0	Friendly
7	23 July 2006	Hindmarsh Stadium, Adelaide, Australia	China	1–0	1–0	2006 AFC Women's Asian Cup
8	23 November 2006	Wildparkstadion, Karlsruhe, Germany	Germany	2–6	3–6	Friendly
9	30 November 2006	Grand Hamad Stadium, Doha, Qatar	Jordan	2–0	13–0	2006 Asian Games
10	12 February 2007	GSZ Stadium, Larnaca, Cyprus	Sweden	1–1	2–2	Friendly
11	10 March 2007	National Olympic Stadium, Tokyo, Japan	Mexico	2–0	2–0	2007 FIFA Women's World Cup qualification
12	10 June 2007	Bucheon Stadium, Bucheon, South Korea	South Korea	2–1	2–2	2008 Summer Olympics qualification
13	4 August 2007	Lạch Tray Stadium, Hai Phong, Vietnam	Vietnam	4–0	8–0	2008 Summer Olympics qualification
14	11 September 2007	Hongkou Football Stadium, Shanghai, China	England	1–0	2–2	2007 FIFA Women's World Cup
15	11 September 2007	Hongkou Football Stadium, Shanghai, China	England	2–2	2–2	2007 FIFA Women's World Cup
16	18 February 2008	Yongchuan Stadium, Chongqing, China	North Korea	2–2	3–2	2008 EAFF Women's Football Championship
17	2 June 2008	Thong Nhat Stadium, Ho Chi Minh City, Vietnam	Australia	3–0	3–1	2008 AFC Women's Asian Cup
18	8 June 2008	Thong Nhat Stadium, Ho Chi Minh City, Vietnam	Australia	2–0	3–1	2008 AFC Women's Asian Cup
19	6 August 2008	Qinhuangdao Olympic Stadium, Qinhuangdao, China	New Zealand	1–2	2–2	2008 Summer Olympics
20	14 November 2009	Urawa Komaba Stadium, Saitama, Japan	New Zealand	1–0	2–1	Friendly
21	6 February 2010	Ajinomoto Stadium, Chōfu, Japan	China	1–0	2–0	2010 EAFF Women's Football Championship
22	20 May 2010	Chengdu Sports Centre, Chengdu, China	Myanmar	5–0	8–0	2010 AFC Women's Asian Cup
23	2 March 2011	Vila Real de Santo António, Portugal	United States	1–2	1–2	2011 Algarve Cup
24	18 June 2011	Ningineer Stadium, Matsuyama, Japan	South Korea	1–0	1–1	Friendly
25	27 June 2011	Ruhrstadion, Bochum, Germany	New Zealand	2–1	2–1	2011 FIFA Women's World Cup
26	17 July 2011	Commerzbank-Arena, Frankfurt, Germany	United States	1–1	2–2	2011 FIFA Women's World Cup
27	5 April 2012	Home's Stadium Kobe, Kobe, Japan	Brazil	3–1	4–1	Kirin Challenge Cup
28	11 July 2012	National Olympic Stadium, Tokyo, Japan	Australia	1–0	3–0	Friendly
29	25 July 2012	City of Coventry Stadium, Coventry, England	Canada	2–0	2–1	2012 Summer Olympics
30	26 September 2013	Fukuda Denshi Arena, Chiba, Japan	Nigeria	1–0	2–0	Friendly
31	5 March 2014	Stadium Bela Vista, Parchal, Portugal	United States	1–1	1–1	2014 Algarve Cup
32	10 March 2014	Estádio Algarve, Faro, Portugal	Sweden	2–1	2–1	2014 Algarve Cup
33	18 September 2014	Namdong Asiad Rugby Field, Incheon, South Korea	Jordan	10–0	12–0	2014 Asian Games
34	1 October 2014	Incheon Munhak Stadium, Incheon, South Korea	North Korea	1–2	1–3	2014 Asian Games
35	11 March 2015	Estádio Algarve, Faro, Portugal	Iceland	1–0	2–0	2015 Algarve Cup
36	11 March 2015	Estádio Algarve, Faro, Portugal	Iceland	2–0	2–0	2015 Algarve Cup
37	9 June 2015	BC Place, Vancouver, Canada	Switzerland	1–0	1–0	2015 FIFA Women's World Cup
38	23 June 2015	BC Place, Vancouver, Canada	Netherlands	2–0	2–1	2015 FIFA Women's World Cup

== Honors ==
Japan

- FIFA Women's World Cup: 2011; runner-up: 2015
- Summer Olympics runner-up: 2012
- AFC Women's Asian Cup: 2014
- Asian Games Gold Medal: 2010
- East Asian Football Championship: 2008, 2010

Individual

- FIFA Women's World Cup All-Star Team: 2011
- FIFA Women's World Cup Bronze Ball: 2015
- AFC Women's Asian Cup Best player: 2014
- AFC Women's Player of the Year: 2011, 2012, 2015
- Algarve Cup Best player: 2012
- L.League Division 1 Best Eleven (6): 2007, 2008, 2011, 2012, 2013, 2014
- L.League Division 2 Best Player: 2004
- L.League Division 2 top scorer: 2004
- FIFPro: FIFA FIFPro World XI 2015
- IFFHS AFC Woman Team of the Decade 2011–2020

== See also ==
- List of women's footballers with 100 or more caps
- List of players who have appeared in multiple FIFA Women's World Cups
