= Kim Yun-mi (footballer) =

North Korean footballer (born 1993)

Kim Yun-Mi
Personal information
- Date of birth: 1 July 1993 (age 33)
- Place of birth: Pyongyang, North Korea
- Position: Midfielder

Senior career*
Years	Team	Apps	(Gls)
- April 25 Sports Club

International career^{‡}
2014–	North Korea		
- * Club domestic league appearances and goals ‡ National team caps and goals as of 5 March 2014 (before the 2014 Algarve Cup)

Kim Yun-Mi (Korean: 김윤미; born 1 July 1993) is a North Korean footballer who plays as a midfielder for the North Korea women's national football team. She was part of the team at the 2014 Algarve Cup, 2014 Asian Games and 2015 EAFF Women's East Asian Cup. At the club level, she played for April 25 Sports Club in North Korea.

== International goals ==
=== National team ===
No.	Date	Venue	Opponent	Score	Result	Competition
1.	11 February 2014	Chongqing, China	Mexico	1–0	2–0	2014 Four Nations Tournament
2.	16 September 2014	Incheon, South Korea	Vietnam	1–0	5–0	2014 Asian Games
3.	16 September 2014	Incheon, South Korea	Vietnam	2–0	5–0	2014 Asian Games
4.	1 October 2014	Incheon, South Korea	Japan	1–0	3–1	2014 Asian Games
5.	10 February 2015	Auckland, New Zealand	Australia	1–1	1–2	Friendly
6.	4 August 2015	Wuhan, China	China	1–0	3–2	2015 EAFF Women's East Asian Cup
7.	5 April 2017	Pyongyang, North Korea	Hong Kong	2–0	5–0	2018 AFC Women's Asian Cup qualification
8.	5 April 2017	Pyongyang, North Korea	Hong Kong	3–0	5–0	2018 AFC Women's Asian Cup qualification
9.	9 April 2017	Pyongyang, North Korea	Uzbekistan	1–0	4–0	2018 AFC Women's Asian Cup qualification
10.	9 April 2017	Pyongyang, North Korea	Uzbekistan	4–0	4–0	2018 AFC Women's Asian Cup qualification
11.	19 October 2017	Chongqing, China	China	2–1	2–1	2017 Yongchuan International Tournament
12.	8 December 2017	Chiba, Japan	China	1–0	2–0	2017 EAFF E-1 Football Championship
13.	8 December 2017	Chiba, Japan	China	2–0	2–0	2017 EAFF E-1 Football Championship
14.	11 December 2017	Chiba, Japan	South Korea	1–0	1–0	2017 EAFF E-1 Football Championship
15.	15 December 2017	Chiba, Japan	Japan	1–0	1–0	2017 EAFF E-1 Football Championship
16.	28 February 2018	Paralimni, Cyprus	Hungary	1–0	2–0	2018 Cyprus Women's Cup
17.	28 February 2018	Paralimni, Cyprus	Hungary	2–0	2–0	2018 Cyprus Women's Cup
18.	7 March 2018	Paralimni, Cyprus	Switzerland	2–1	2–1	2018 Cyprus Women's Cup
19.	17 August 2018	Palembang, Indonesia	Tajikistan	3–0	16–0	2018 Asian Games
20.	17 August 2018	Palembang, Indonesia	Tajikistan	4–0	16–0	2018 Asian Games
21.	17 August 2018	Palembang, Indonesia	Tajikistan	10–0	16–0	2018 Asian Games
22.	20 August 2018	Palembang, Indonesia	Hong Kong	3–0	8–0	2018 Asian Games
23.	27 February 2019	Pyla, Cyprus	Czech Republic	2–0	4–2	2019 Cyprus Women's Cup
24.	27 February 2019	Pyla, Cyprus	Czech Republic	4–2	4–2	2019 Cyprus Women's Cup
25.	1 March 2019	Larnaca, Cyprus	South Africa	1–0	4–1	2019 Cyprus Women's Cup
26.	1 March 2019	Larnaca, Cyprus	South Africa	3–0	4–1	2019 Cyprus Women's Cup
27.	6 March 2019	Larnaca, Cyprus	Italy	1–1	3–3 (a.e.t.) (7–6 p)	2019 Cyprus Women's Cup
