= Shin Dam-yeong =

South Korean footballer

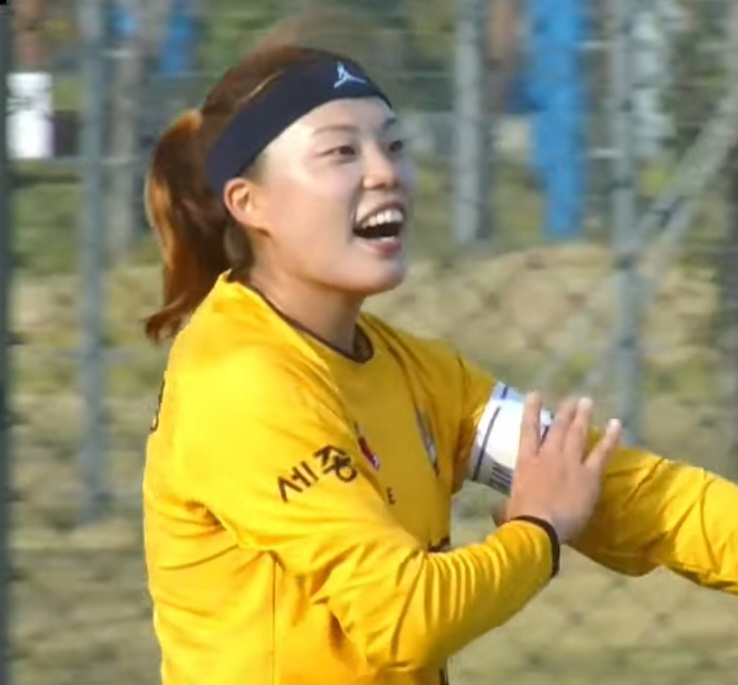
- 2022

Personal information
- Date of birth: 2 October 1993 (age 33)
- Height: 1.70 m (5 ft 7 in)
- Position: Defender

Team information
- Current team: Sejong Sportstoto WFC
- Number: 5

Senior career*
| Years | Team | Apps | (Gls) |
| 2014-2018 | Suwon UDC | | |
| 2019–2021 | Hyundai Steel Red Angels | | |
| 2022- | Sejong Sportstoto WFC | 22 | (1) |

International career^{‡}
| 2009–2010 | South Korea U17 | 12 | (1) |
| 2012 | South Korea U20 | 4 | (0) |
| 2014– | South Korea | 39 | (1) |
- * Club domestic league appearances and goals ‡ National team caps and goals as of 01:02, 24 June 2026 (UTC)

- Shin Dam-yeong
- Hangul: 신담영
- RR: Sin Damyeong
- MR: Sin Tamyŏng

Shin Dam-yeong (Korean pronunciation: [ɕin.da.mjʌŋ] or [ɕin] [ta.mjʌŋ]; born 2 October 1993) is a South Korean footballer who plays for Sejong Sportstoto WFC and the South Korean national team.

== Early life ==
Shin was born in Geoje as the second of three children. She started playing football in the second grade at Sangin Elementary School in Daegu, and continued to train at Sangwon Elementary School, following in the footsteps of her older sister, Shin Soo-yeon, who also played football. Shin continued her youth career at Dongbu High School in Daegu and Ulsan College.

== Club career ==
Shin was signed by Suwon FMC in the first round of the 2014 WK League new players draft. She transferred to Incheon Hyundai Steel Red Angels ahead of the 2019 WK League season. Having won three WK League titles with the Red Angels, Shin later moved to Sejong Sportstoto, reuniting with former national team manager Yoon Deok-yeo. Shin is one of Sportstoto's vice-captains in 2026.

== International career ==
Shin was part of the South Korea under-17 squad that won the 2010 FIFA U-17 Women's World Cup. She went on to play at the 2011 AFC U-19 Women's Championship and the 2012 FIFA U-20 Women's World Cup.

Shin made her full international debut at the 2014 Cyprus Women's Cup, where South Korea finished in third place; Shin was sent off in the third-place playoff match against Scotland.

Shin was originally selected to represent South Korea at the 2015 FIFA Women's World Cup, but sustained an ankle injury during preparation for the tournament and was replaced in the final squad by Kim Hye-yeong. Goalkeeper and Suwon teammate Yoon Young-geul wrote Shin's name on her gloves to mark her absence from the tournament.

She was included in South Korea's squad for the 2018 Asian Games and the 2019 FIFA Women's World Cup.

== International goals ==
Scores and results list South Korea's goal tally first.

| No. | Date | Venue | Opponent | Score | Result | Competition | Ref. |
|---|---|---|---|---|---|---|---|
| 1. | 21 September 2014 | Munhak Stadium, Incheon, South Korea | Maldives | 6–0 | 13–0 | 2014 Asian Games | |

== Honours ==
=== Incheon Hyundai Steel Red Angels ===
- WK League
  - Champions: 2019, 2020, 2021

=== South Korea U-17 ===
- FIFA U-17 Women's World Cup
  - Winners: 2010
