= Naphat Seesraum =

Thai footballer (born 1987)

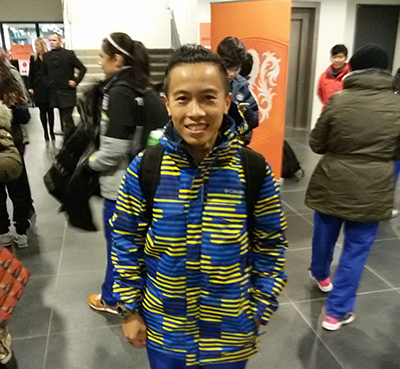

Personal information
- Full name: Naphat Seesraum
- Birth name: Junpen Seesraum
- Date of birth: 11 May 1987 (age 39)
- Place of birth: Nong Bua Lamphu, Thailand
- Height: 1.51 m (4 ft 11 1/2 in)
- Position: Midfielder

Senior career*
Years	Team	Apps	(Gls)
2009–2010	G.H. Bank RBAC		
2011	BG-Bandit Asia		
2013	Speranza F.C. Osaka-Takatsuki		
2013–????	BG-Bandit Asia		

International career^{‡}
2007–2015	Thailand	84	(32)
Medal record
Women's football
Representing Thailand
Southeast Asian Games
Gold medal – first place	2007 Kuala Lumpur	Team
Gold medal – first place	2013	Team
Silver medal – second place	2009 Vientiane	Team
Silver medal – second place	2017 Kuala Lumpur	Team
- * Club domestic league appearances and goals as of 21 June 2013 ‡ National team caps and goals as of 22:29, 17 June 2015 (UTC)

Naphat Seesraum (Thai: นภัทร สีเสริม, born 11 May 1987), formerly known as Junpen Seesraum (Thai: จันทร์เพ็ญ สีเสริม), is a former Thai football midfielder.

== International goals ==
No.	Date	Venue	Opponent	Score	Result	Competition
1.	4 July 2009	Rajamangala Stadium, Bangkok, Thailand	Uzbekistan	5–1	6–1	2010 AFC Women's Asian Cup qualification
2.	4 July 2009	Rajamangala Stadium, Bangkok, Thailand	Uzbekistan	6–1	6–1	2010 AFC Women's Asian Cup qualification
3.	8 July 2009	Rajamangala Stadium, Bangkok, Thailand	Iran	7–1	8–1	2010 AFC Women's Asian Cup qualification
4.	24 May 2010	Shuangliu Sports Center, Chengdu, China	Myanmar	1–0	2–0	2010 AFC Women's Asian Cup
5.	14 September 2012	Thống Nhất Stadium, Ho Chi Minh City, Vietnam	Malaysia	1–0	4–0	2012 AFF Women's Championship
6.	21 May 2013	Bangabandhu National Stadium, Dhaka, Bangladesh	Bangladesh	2–0	9–0	2014 AFC Women's Asian Cup qualification
7.	25 May 2013	Bangabandhu National Stadium, Dhaka, Bangladesh	Iran	4–0	5–1	2014 AFC Women's Asian Cup qualification
8.	20 December 2013	Mandalarthiri Stadium, Mandalay, Myanmar	Vietnam	1–1	2–1	2013 Southeast Asian Games
9.	17 September 2014	Incheon Namdong Asiad Rugby Field, Incheon, South Korea	Maldives	9–0	10–0	2014 Asian Games
10.	21 September 2014	Incheon Namdong Asiad Rugby Field, Incheon, South Korea	India	10–0	10–0	2014 Asian Games
11.	20 August 2017	UiTM Stadium, Shah Alam, Malaysia	Malaysia	4–0	6–0	2017 Southeast Asian Games

== Honours ==
=== Club ===
RBAC

- Thai Women's Premier League: 2009, 2010

BG-Bandit Asia

- Thai Women's Premier League: 2011, 2013

=== International ===
- AFC Women's Championship: Fifth place: 2014
- AFF Women's Championship: 2011, 2015; runner-up: 2007; third place: 2008, 2012.
- Southeast Asian Games: Gold medal: 2007, 2013; silver medal: 2009, 2017
