= Ulsan College =

- 울산과학대학교
- Seal of Ulsan College
- Former names: Ulsan Industrial Technology Institute; Ulsan Industrial Technical College
- Motto: 성실, 창의, 봉사
- Motto in English: Sincerity, Creativity, Service
- Type: Private college
- Established: 8 April 1960
- President: Dr. Heo Jeongseok (허정석)
- Academic staff: 304 (2012)
- Students: 5,717 (2012)
- Location: Ulsan, South Korea; 35.49578°N 129.41568°E (East Campus)
- Campus: urban, multiple campuses
- Colors: Main color: Green Other colors:
- Website: eng.uc.ac.kr

- Ulsan College
- Hangul: 울산과학대학교
- Hanja: 蔚山科學大學校
- RR: Ulsan gwahak daehakgyo
- MR: Ulsan kwahak taehakkyo

Ulsan College (Korean: 울산과학대학교; lit. 'Ulsan College of Science') is a private college with two campuses in Ulsan, South Korea. The East Campus is in Dong-gu and the West Campus in Nam-gu. It was founded on 8 April 1960 as the Ulsan Industrial Technology Institute. Hyundai Heavy Industries is the college's owner and financial sponsor.

== History ==
The Ulsan Industrial Technology Institute was founded as an affiliate of the College of Engineering at the University of Ulsan. The opening ceremony for the first school year was on 10 March 1973. The college was renamed the Ulsan Industrial Technical College on 1 March 1985, then renamed Ulsan College on 11 November 1998. The East Campus was opened on 17 March 2000.

== Academics ==
The college's four departments currently offer the following programs. All programs are offered at the East Campus, except where noted.

=== Engineering ===
- Environment & Building Design (3-year program)
- Information Technology (3-year program)
- Digital Content Design
- Mechanical Engineering (3-year program, West Campus)
- Electricity & Electronics (3-year program, West Campus)
- Industrial Management (West Campus)
- Environmental & Chemical Industry (West Campus)

=== Liberal arts and science ===
- Early Childhood Education (3-year program)
- Social Welfare
- Tax Accounting
- Distribution Management
- Business & Foreign Languages

=== Natural science ===
- Nursing (4-year program)
- Physical Therapy (3-year program)
- Dental Hygiene (3-year program)
- Food & Nutrition (3-year program)
- Hotel Food Service & Culinary Arts

=== Sports and leisure ===
- Athletic Training

== Notable people ==
- Jung Jung-suk (정정숙), a former South Korean women's football player, attended Ulsan College
- Jun Min-kyung (전민경), a South Korean women's football goalkeeper, attended Ulsan College
- Kim Ki-hoon (김기훈), a retired short track speed skater and Olympic gold medal, is a professor at Ulsan College
- Kim Soon-ja (김순자), an independent candidate in the 2012 South Korean legislative election, previously worked as a manager of the Korean Confederation of Trade Unions at Ulsan College
- Mun Sori (문소리), a South Korean football goalkeeper who won a bronze medal at the 2010 Asian Games, attended Ulsan College

== See also ==
- List of universities and colleges in South Korea
