= Ho Un-byol =

North Korean footballer (born 1992)

Personal information
- Date of birth: 19 January 1992 (age 34)
- Position: Defender

Senior career*
Years	Team	Apps	(Gls)
- 25 April

International career^{‡}
	North Korea	1	(0)
- * Club domestic league appearances and goals ‡ National team caps and goals as of 26 June 2011 (before the 2011 FIFA Women's World Cup)

Ho Un-byol (Korean: 허은별; born 19 January 1992) is a North Korean football defender for the North Korea women's national football team and for the April 25 Sports Club in the DPR Korea Women's League in North Korea. She was part of the team at the 2007 FIFA Women's World Cup and 2011 FIFA Women's World Cup. In December 2013 she was given the title of "Merited Athlete" after becoming top scorer in the 2013 EAFF Women's East Asian Cup, and in February 2014, she was named North Korean Female Footballer of the Year for 2013.

== International goals ==
=== Under-16 ===
No.	Date	Venue	Opponent	Score	Result	Competition
1.	10 March 2007	Petaling Jaya, Malaysia	Thailand	1–1	7–1	2007 AFC U-16 Women's Championship
2.	10 March 2007	Petaling Jaya, Malaysia	Thailand	4–1	7–1	2007 AFC U-16 Women's Championship
3.	14 March 2007	Shah Alam, Malaysia	South Korea	2–1	4–1	2007 AFC U-16 Women's Championship
4.	29 October 2008	Christchurch, New Zealand	Ghana	1–0	1–1	2008 FIFA U-17 Women's World Cup

=== Under 19 ===
No.	Date	Venue	Opponent	Score	Result	Competition
1.	2 August 2009	Wuhan, China	Thailand	1–0	4–0	2009 AFC U-19 Women's Championship
2.	6 August 2009	Wuhan, China	South Korea	1–0	3–0	2009 AFC U-19 Women's Championship
3.	12 August 2009	Wuhan, China	China	1–0	1–0	2009 AFC U-19 Women's Championship
4.	13 July 2010	Bielefeld, Germany	Brazil	1–0	1–0	2010 FIFA U-20 Women's World Cup

=== National team ===
No.	Date	Venue	Opponent	Score	Result	Competition
1.	21 July 2013	Seoul, South Korea	South Korea	1–1	2–1	2013 EAFF Women's East Asian Cup
2.	21 July 2013	Seoul, South Korea	South Korea	2–1	2–1	2013 EAFF Women's East Asian Cup
3.	7 March 2014	Lagos, Portugal	Austria	2–0	2–0	2014 Algarve Cup
4.	10 March 2014	Faro, Portugal	Portugal	1–0	2–0	2014 Algarve Cup
5.	20 September 2014	Incheon, South Korea	Hong Kong	4–0	5–0	2014 Asian Games
6.	26 September 2014	Ansan, South Korea	China	1–0	1–0	2014 Asian Games
7.	29 September 2014	Incheon, South Korea	South Korea	2–1	2–1	2014 Asian Games
8.	1 October 2014	Incheon, South Korea	Japan	3–1	3–1	2014 Asian Games
9.	1 March 2017	Larnaca, Cyprus	Italy	3–0	3–0	2017 Cyprus Women's Cup
10.	6 March 2017	Larnaca, Cyprus	Belgium	2–0	4–1	2017 Cyprus Women's Cup
