= Ra Un-sim =

North Korean footballer

Personal information
- Date of birth: July 2, 1988 (age 38)
- Place of birth: Kyongsong County, North Korea
- Position: Forward

Team information
- Current team: April 25

International career^{‡}
Years	Team	Apps	(Gls)
2006–2008	North Korea U20		
2010–2016	North Korea	10	(4)
- ‡ National team caps and goals as of 03:39, 7 March 2016 (UTC)

- Ra Un-sim
- Hangul: 라은심
- RR: Ra Eunsim
- MR: Ra Ŭnsim

Ra Un-sim (Korean pronunciation: [ɾa.ɯn.ɕim]; born 2 July 1988), Hero of Labor, is a North Korean female international football player.

She plays club football with April 25 of the Korea DPR Women's League. In January 2016, she was named number one of the DPRK's ten best athletes of 2015. In the 2017 edition of the women's Paektusan Prize tournament she was the top goalscorer with 8 goals.

== International goals ==
=== Under 19 ===
No.	Date	Venue	Opponent	Score	Result	Competition
1.	6 October 2007	Chongqing Olympic Sports Centre, Chongqing, China	Myanmar	2–0	3–0	2007 AFC U-19 Women's Championship
2.	8 October 2007	Chongqing Olympic Sports Centre, Chongqing, China	Australia	2–1	2–1	2007 AFC U-19 Women's Championship
3.	10 October 2007	Chongqing Olympic Sports Centre, Chongqing, China	Japan	2–1	3–1	2007 AFC U-19 Women's Championship
4.	16 October 2007	Chongqing Olympic Sports Centre, Chongqing, China	Japan	1–0	1–0	2007 AFC U-19 Women's Championship

=== National team ===
No.	Date	Venue	Opponent	Score	Result	Competition
1.	24 May 2010	Chengdu, China	Japan	1–2	1–2	2010 AFC Women's Asian Cup
2.	16 November 2010	Guangzhou, China	Thailand	2–0	2–0	2010 Asian Games
3.	20 November 2010	Guangzhou, China	South Korea	2–1	3–1	2010 Asian Games
4.	20 November 2010	Guangzhou, China	South Korea	3–1	3–1	2010 Asian Games
5.	18 May 2011	Venlo, Netherlands	Netherlands	1–0	1–1	Friendly
6.	5 September 2011	Jinan, China	South Korea	1–0	3–2	2012 Summer Olympics qualification
7.	11 September 2011	Jinan, China	Thailand	3–0	5–0	2012 Summer Olympics qualification
8.	11 September 2011	Jinan, China	Thailand	5–0	5–0	2012 Summer Olympics qualification
9.	11 February 2014	Chongqing, China	Mexico	2–0	2–0	2014 Four Nations Tournament
10.	5 March 2014	Lagos, Portugal	Russia	2–0	2–1	2014 Algarve Cup
11.	9 March 2014	Faro, Portugal	Portugal	2–0	2–0	2014 Algarve Cup
12.	20 September 2014	Incheon, South Korea	Hong Kong	5–0	5–0	2014 Asian Games
13.	1 October 2014	Incheon, South Korea	Japan	2–0	3–1	2014 Asian Games
14.	1 August 2015	Wuhan, China	Japan	3–2	4–2	2015 EAFF Women's East Asian Cup
15.	1 August 2015	Wuhan, China	Japan	4–2	4–2	2015 EAFF Women's East Asian Cup
16.	8 August 2015	Wuhan, China	South Korea	1–0	2–0	2015 EAFF Women's East Asian Cup
17.	2 March 2016	Osaka, Japan	China	1–0	1–1	2016 AFC Women's Olympic Qualifying Tournament

== Honours ==
North Korea

Winner

- EAFF Women's East Asian Cup: 2015

Runners-up

- AFC Women's Asian Cup: 2010
