= Kim Un-ju (footballer, born 1993) =

North Korean footballer

- Hangul: 김은주
- RR: Gim Eunju
- MR: Kim Ŭnju

Kim Un-ju (Korean pronunciation: [ki.mɯn.dzu] or [kim] [ɯn.dzu]; born 9 April 1993 in Pyongyang) is a North Korean football player that plays for the North Korea women's national football team. She played in the 2011 FIFA Women's World Cup.

== International goals ==
No.	Date	Venue	Opponent	Score	Result	Competition
1.	16 September 2014	Namdong Asiad Rugby Field, Incheon, South Korea	Vietnam	3–0	5–0	2014 Asian Games
