= Jong Yu-ri =

North Korean footballer (born 1992)

Jong Yu-Ri
Personal information
- Date of birth: 21 June 1992 (age 34)
- Position: Midfielder

Senior career*
Years	Team	Apps	(Gls)
- Sobaeksu Sports Club

International career^{‡}
2014–	North Korea		
- * Club domestic league appearances and goals ‡ National team caps and goals as of 5 March 2014

Jong Yu-Ri (Korean: 정유리; born 21 June 1992) is a North Korean footballer who plays as a midfielder who plays for the North Korea women's national football team. She was part of the team at the 2014 Asian Games and 2014 Algarve Cup. At the club level, she played for Sobaeksu Sports Club in North Korea.
