= Aminath Leeza =

Maldivian footballer (born 1986)

Personal information
- Date of birth: 25 November 1986 (age 39)
- Place of birth: Maldives
- Position: Goalkeeper

International career
Years	Team	Apps	(Gls)
2010 –	Maldives		

Aminath Leeza (Dhivehi: އާމިނަތު ލީޒާ; born 25 November 1986) is a Maldivian football footballer who plays as a goalkeeper.

== Early life ==
Leeza was born on 25 November 1986 in the Maldives. Initially, she played basketball before switching to football in 2009 after playing in a tournament.

== Career ==
Leeza started playing for the Maldives women's national football team in 2010 and played for the team in the 2024 SAFF Women's Championship, where she was regarded as one of their experienced veteran players. However, the team finished fourth in their group so did not progress to the knockout stage. Previously, she helped the Maldives women's national football team achieve third place at the 2019 South Asian Games. In 2023, she was awarded the 2022 Maldives Football Awards Best Women's Player.

== Personal life ==
Leeza worked in forensics for the Maldives Police Service. Altogether, she has been married twice.
