= Park Hee-young (footballer, born 1991) =

South Korean footballer

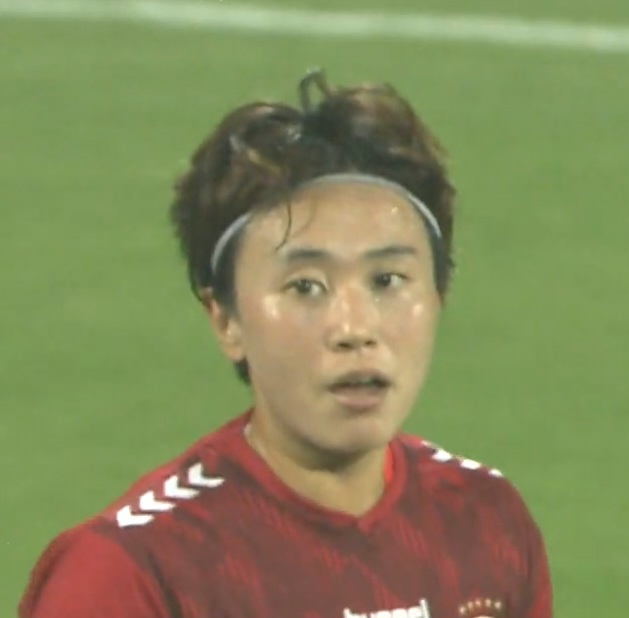

Personal information
- Date of birth: 21 March 1991 (age 35)
- Height: 1.60 m (5 ft 3 in)
- Position: Midfielder

Team information
- Current team: Sejong Sportstoto WFC
- Number: 9

Senior career*
Years	Team	Apps	(Gls)
2015–2022	Hyundai Steel Red Angels	5	(11)
2023–2025	Seoul WFC	31	(2)
2026–	Sejong Sportstoto WFC	5	(2)

International career
2007–2008	South Korea U17	14	(5)
2009–2010	South Korea U20	8	(2)
2010–2015	South Korea	41	(7)
- * Club domestic league appearances and goals

- Park Hee-young
- Hangul: 박희영
- RR: Bak Huiyeong
- MR: Pak Hŭiyŏng

Park Hee-young (Korean pronunciation: [pa.kʰi.jʌŋ] or [pak̚] [hi.jʌŋ]; born 21 March 1991) is a South Korean women's football midfielder who plays for Sejong Sportstoto WFC.
