= Incheon Munhak Stadium =

Sports stadium in Incheon, South Korea

Coordinates: 37°26′06.5″N 126°41′26.9″E

- Interactive map of Incheon Munhak Stadium
- Former names: Incheon World Cup Stadium
- Location: 482, Munhak-dong, Nam-gu, Incheon, South Korea
- Owner: Incheon Metropolitan City Hall
- Operator: SK Wyverns
- Capacity: 49,084
- Surface: Grass
- Public transit: Incheon Subway: at Munhak Sports Complex

Construction
- Groundbreaking: July 20, 1994; 32 years ago
- Opened: February 25, 2002; 24 years ago
- Cost: 125.2 billion won
- Architects: Adome Architects & Engineers Inc.

Tenants
- Incheon United (2004–2011); Incheon Korail (2012–2013)

The Incheon Munhak Stadium (a.k.a. Incheon World Cup Stadium or Munhak Stadium) is a sports complex in Incheon, South Korea and includes a multi-purpose stadium, a baseball park, and other sports facilities.

== Facilities ==
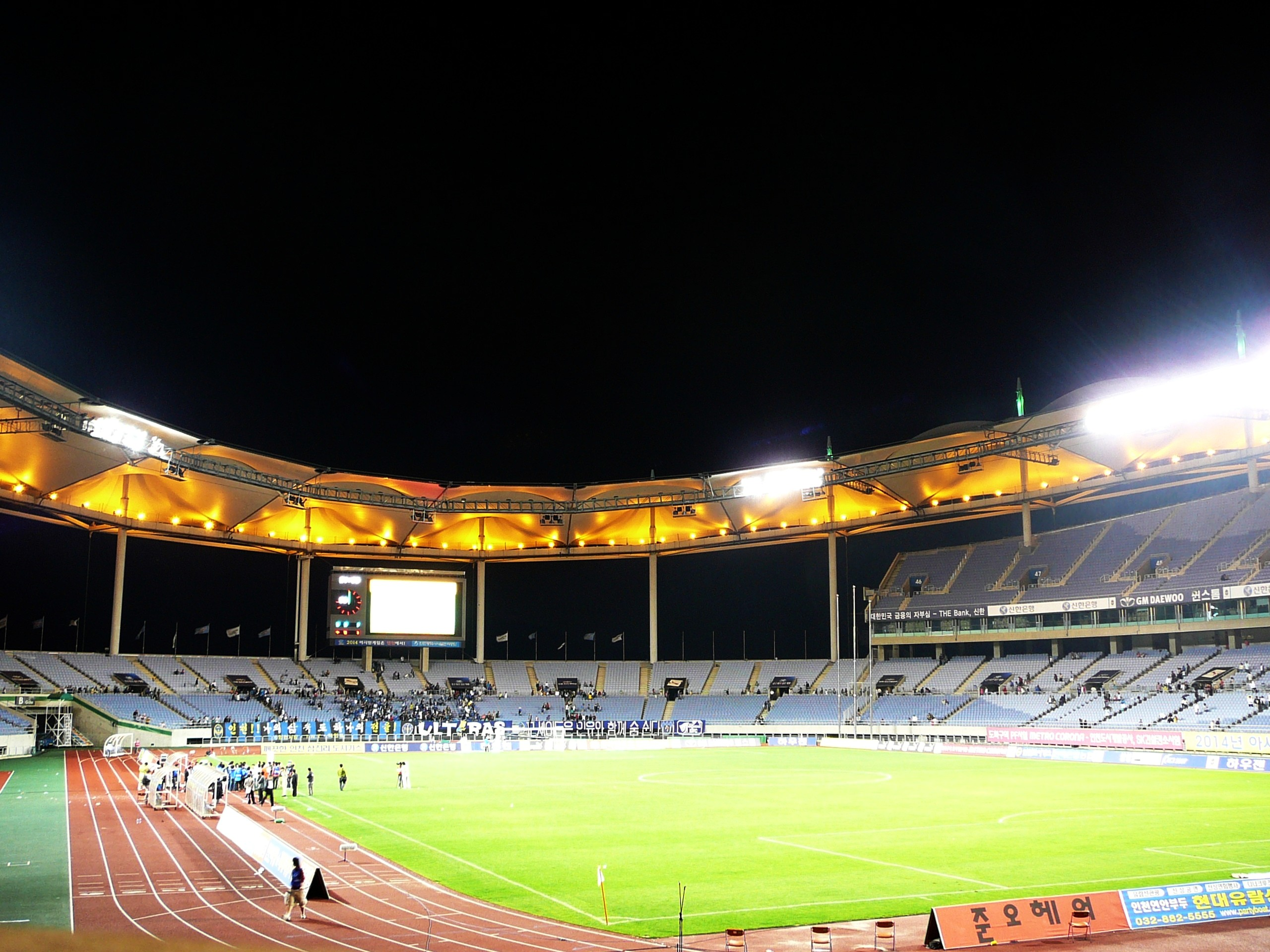
Field of the stadium

=== Incheon Munhak Stadium ===
Incheon Munhak Stadium, initially named Incheon World Cup Stadium, was Incheon United's home stadium from 2004 to 2011. It hosted three group stage matches at the 2002 FIFA World Cup. It also hosted the 2005 Asian Athletics Championships and the football matches during the 2014 Asian Games, as well as the opening and closing ceremonies of the 2014 Asian Para Games. In November 2018, the stadium hosted the 2018 League of Legends World Championship final.

==== 2002 World Cup matches played in Munhak Stadium ====
Date	Team 1	Result	Team 2	Round	Attendance
9 June 2002	Costa Rica	1–1	Turkey	Group C	42,299
11 June 2002	Denmark	2–0	France	Group A	48,100
14 June 2002	Portugal	0–1	South Korea	Group D	50,239

=== Munhak Baseball Stadium ===
The Munhak Baseball Stadium is the home baseball stadium of the SSG Landers and lies adjacent to the Incheon Munhak Stadium.

Preceded by Rizal Memorial Stadium; Manila	Asian Athletics Championships; Venue; 2005	Succeeded by Amman International Stadium; Amman
Preceded by Tianhe Stadium; Guangzhou	Asian Games Men's Football tournament Final Venue; 2014	Succeeded by Pakansari Stadium; Bogor
Preceded by Tianhe Stadium; Guangzhou	Asian Games Women's Football tournament Final Venue; 2014	Succeeded by Gelora Sriwijaya Stadium; Palembang
Preceded by Beijing National Stadium; Beijing	League of Legends World Championship; Final Venue; 2018	Succeeded by AccorHotels Arena; Paris
