= Incheon Namdong Asiad Rugby Field =

Rugby stadium in Incheon, South Korea

Namdong Asiad Rugby Field
- Interactive map of Namdong Asiad Rugby Field
- Location: 403-1 Namchondorim-dong, Namdong-gu, Incheon, South Korea
- Coordinates: 37°26′16″N 126°44′02″E
- Owner: Incheon City Hall
- Operator: Incheon Metropolitan Sports Association
- Capacity: 4,968
- Surface: Grass

Construction
- Opened: 27 September 2013

Tenants
- South Korea national rugby union team Incheon Hyundai Steel Red Angels; Hyundai Glovis Rugby

Incheon Namdong Asiad Rugby Field (Korean: 남동아시아드럭비경기장) is a multi-purpose stadium located in Incheon, South Korea. It is used for rugby and football matches, and is the home ground of the South Korea national rugby union team and Incheon Hyundai Steel Red Angels of the WK League.

== History ==
The stadium opened in September 2013, having been built as a venue for the rugby sevens events at the 2014 Asian Games. In late 2014, it was announced that Incheon Hyundai Steel Red Angels would use the stadium as their home ground from the 2015 WK League season.

== Structure and facilities ==
The stadium consists of a main field and an auxiliary pitch. The main field is flanked by two stands: the main stand in the west and an uncovered stand to the east. The two stands are linked by an elevated pathway, which also connects to the Namdong Gymnasium.
