= 2019 in Japanese football =

Football in Japan
- Season: 2019

Men's football
- J1 League: Yokohama F. Marinos
- J2 League: Kashiwa Reysol
- J3 League: Giravanz Kitakyushu
- Japan Football League: Honda FC
- Emperor's Cup: Vissel Kobe
- J.League Cup: Kawasaki Frontale
- Japanese Super Cup: Kawasaki Frontale

Japanese football in 2019.

== Promotion and relegation ==
Teams relegated from J1 League

- Kashiwa Reysol
- V-Varen Nagasaki

Teams promoted to J1 League

- Matsumoto Yamaga
- Oita Trinita

Teams relegated from J2 League

- Roasso Kumamoto
- Kamatamare Sanuki

Teams promoted to J2 League

- FC Ryukyu
- Kagoshima United FC

Teams relegated from J3 League

No relegation to the Japan Football League

Teams promoted to J3 League

- Vanraure Hachinohe

Teams relegated from Japan Football League

- Cobaltore Onagawa

Teams promoted to Japan Football League

- Matsue City
- Suzuka Unlimited

== J1 League ==
Pos	Team	Pld	W	D	L	GF	GA	GD	Pts	Qualification or relegation
1	Yokohama F. Marinos (C)	34	22	4	8	68	38	+30	70	Qualification for the Champions League group stage
2	FC Tokyo	34	19	7	8	46	29	+17	64	Qualification for the Champions League play-off round
3	Kashima Antlers	34	18	9	7	54	30	+24	63	Qualification for the Champions League play-off round
4	Kawasaki Frontale	34	16	12	6	57	34	+23	60	
5	Cerezo Osaka	34	18	5	11	39	25	+14	59	
6	Sanfrecce Hiroshima	34	15	10	9	45	29	+16	55	
7	Gamba Osaka	34	12	11	11	54	48	+6	47	
8	Vissel Kobe	34	14	5	15	61	59	+2	47	Qualification for the Champions League group stage (Note: Vissel Kobe qualified for the 2020 AFC Champions League group stage as 2019 Emperor's Cup winners.)
9	Oita Trinita	34	12	11	11	35	35	0	47	
10	Hokkaido Consadole Sapporo	34	13	7	14	54	49	+5	46	
11	Vegalta Sendai	34	12	5	17	38	45	−7	41	
12	Shimizu S-Pulse	34	11	6	17	45	69	−24	39	
13	Nagoya Grampus	34	9	10	15	45	50	−5	37	
14	Urawa Red Diamonds	34	9	10	15	34	50	−16	37	
15	Sagan Tosu	34	10	6	18	32	53	−21	36	
16	Shonan Bellmare (O)	34	10	6	18	40	63	−23	36	Qualification for the Relegation play-off
17	Matsumoto Yamaga (R)	34	6	13	15	21	40	−19	31	Relegation to J2 League
18	Júbilo Iwata (R)	34	8	7	19	29	51	−22	31	Relegation to J2 League

Source: Meiji Yasuda J1 League
Rules for classification: 1) Points; 2) Goal difference; 3) Goals scored.
(C) Champions; (O) Play-off winners; (R) Relegated

== J2 League ==
Pos	Team	Pld	W	D	L	GF	GA	GD	Pts	Promotion, qualification or relegation
1	Kashiwa Reysol (C, P)	42	25	9	8	85	33	+52	84	Promotion to 2020 J1 League
2	Yokohama FC (P)	42	23	10	9	66	40	+26	79	Promotion to 2020 J1 League
3	Omiya Ardija	42	20	15	7	62	40	+22	75	Qualification for promotion play-offs (Note: Only teams that meet J1 license criteria can participate in promotion play-offs. If one or more teams fail to meet the criteria, only eligible teams that finished 3rd to 6th will participate and no replacement teams will be added.)
4	Tokushima Vortis	42	21	10	11	67	45	+22	73	Qualification for promotion play-offs
5	Ventforet Kofu	42	20	11	11	64	40	+24	71	Qualification for promotion play-offs
6	Montedio Yamagata	42	20	10	12	59	40	+19	70	Qualification for promotion play-offs
7	Mito HollyHock	42	19	13	10	56	37	+19	70	
8	Kyoto Sanga	42	19	11	12	59	56	+3	68	
9	Fagiano Okayama	42	18	11	13	49	47	+2	65	
10	Albirex Niigata	42	17	11	14	71	52	+19	62	
11	Zweigen Kanazawa	42	15	16	11	58	46	+12	61	
12	V-Varen Nagasaki	42	17	5	20	57	61	−4	56	
13	Tokyo Verdy	42	14	13	15	59	59	0	55	
14	FC Ryukyu	42	13	10	19	57	80	−23	49	
15	Renofa Yamaguchi	42	13	8	21	54	70	−16	47	
16	Avispa Fukuoka	42	12	8	22	39	62	−23	44	
17	JEF United Chiba	42	10	13	19	46	64	−18	43	
18	Machida Zelvia	42	9	16	17	36	59	−23	43	
19	Ehime FC	42	12	6	24	46	62	−16	42	
20	Tochigi SC	42	8	16	18	33	53	−20	40	
21	Kagoshima United (R)	42	11	7	24	41	73	−32	40	Relegation to 2020 J3 League (Note: Direct exchange between J2 and J3 is subject to eligibility of J2-licensed teams in top 2 of 2019 J3 League.)
22	FC Gifu (R)	42	7	9	26	33	78	−45	30	Relegation to 2020 J3 League

Source: Meiji Yasuda J2 League
Rules for classification: 1) Points; 2) Goal difference; 3) Goals scored
(C) Champions; (P) Promoted; (R) Relegated

== J3 League ==
Pos	Team	Pld	W	D	L	GF	GA	GD	Pts	Promotion
1	Giravanz Kitakyushu (C, P)	34	19	9	6	51	27	+24	66	Promotion to 2020 J2 League (Note: Only teams that hold a J2 license are eligible for promotion.)
2	Thespakusatsu Gunma (P)	34	18	9	7	59	34	+25	63	Promotion to 2020 J2 League
3	Fujieda MYFC	34	18	9	7	42	31	+11	63	Ineligible for promotion
4	Kataller Toyama	34	16	10	8	54	31	+23	58	
5	Roasso Kumamoto	34	16	9	9	45	39	+6	57	
6	Cerezo Osaka U-23	34	16	4	14	49	56	−7	52	Ineligible for promotion
7	Gainare Tottori	34	14	8	12	49	59	−10	50	
8	Blaublitz Akita	34	13	10	11	45	35	+10	49	
9	Nagano Parceiro	34	13	10	11	35	34	+1	49	
10	Vanraure Hachinohe	34	14	6	14	49	42	+7	48	Ineligible for promotion
11	Fukushima United	34	13	4	17	45	53	−8	43	Ineligible for promotion
12	Azul Claro Numazu	34	11	6	17	35	43	−8	39	Ineligible for promotion
13	YSCC Yokohama	34	12	3	19	53	65	−12	39	Ineligible for promotion
14	Kamatamare Sanuki	34	10	9	15	33	49	−16	39	
15	SC Sagamihara	34	10	8	16	36	45	−9	38	Ineligible for promotion
16	FC Tokyo U-23	34	9	9	16	43	52	−9	36	Ineligible for promotion
17	Gamba Osaka U-23	34	9	8	17	54	55	−1	35	Ineligible for promotion
18	Iwate Grulla Morioka	34	7	5	22	36	63	−27	26	Ineligible for promotion

Source: 2019 MEIJI YASUDA J3 LEAGUE League table
Rules for classification: 1) Points; 2) Goal difference; 3) Goals scored; 4th) head-to-head results; 5th) disciplinary points; 6th) draw
(C) Champions; (P) Promoted

== Japan Football League ==
Pos	Team	Pld	W	D	L	GF	GA	GD	Pts	Promotion
1	Honda FC (C)	30	19	6	5	59	30	+29	63	
2	Sony Sendai	30	16	7	7	60	34	+26	55	
3	**FC Imabari** (P)	30	13	12	5	41	26	+15	51	Promotion to 2020 J3 League (Note: To qualify for promotion, a club must hold a 100 Year Plan status, obtain a J3 license (marked in bold in the table), and finish both in the top 4 of the JFL, and either 1st or 2nd among the promotion-eligible clubs. Average home attendance of at least 2,000 is also required.)
4	**Tokyo Musashino City**	30	13	9	8	44	39	+5	48	
5	**Tegevajaro Miyazaki**	30	11	8	11	37	34	+3	41	
6	Honda Lock	30	10	11	9	41	39	+2	41	
7	Verspah Oita	30	10	10	10	42	36	+6	40	
8	FC Osaka	30	10	10	10	33	32	+1	40	
9	MIO Biwako Shiga	30	11	7	12	27	40	−13	40	
10	Veertien Mie	30	10	9	11	38	34	+4	39	
11	Maruyasu Okazaki	30	9	11	10	30	30	0	38	
12	Suzuka Unlimited FC	30	9	9	12	43	47	−4	36	
13	**ReinMeer Aomori**	30	9	9	12	40	44	−4	36	
14	**Nara Club**	30	8	10	12	27	32	−5	34	
15	Matsue City FC	30	5	10	15	26	51	−25	25	
16	Ryutsu Keizai Dragons (R)	30	5	6	19	35	75	−40	21	Relegation to regional leagues

Source: JFL website (in Japanese)
Rules for classification: 1) Points; 2) Goal difference; 3) Goals scored; 4) Head-to-head results; 5) Disciplinary points; 6) Draw
(C) Champions; (P) Promoted; (R) Relegated

== National team (Men) ==
=== Results ===
2019.01.09	Japan	3–2	Turkmenistan	United Arab Emirates
	Osako 56', 60'; Doan 71'	JFA	? 26' ? 79'

2019.01.13	Japan	1–0	Oman	United Arab Emirates
	Haraguchi 28'	JFA

2019.01.17	Japan	2–1	Uzbekistan	United Arab Emirates
	Muto 43'; Shiotani 58'	JFA	? 40'

2019.01.21	Japan	1–0	Saudi Arabia	United Arab Emirates
	Tomiyasu 20'	JFA

2019.01.24	Japan	1–0	Vietnam	United Arab Emirates
	Doan 57'	JFA

2019.01.28	Japan	3–0	Iran	United Arab Emirates
	Osako 56', 67'; Haraguchi 90'	JFA

2019.02.01	Japan	1–3	Qatar	United Arab Emirates
	Minamino 69'	JFA	? 12' ? 27' ? 83'

2019.03.22	Japan	0–1	Colombia	Kanagawa
		JFA	? 64'

2019.03.26	Japan	1–0	Bolivia	Hyogo
	Nakajima 76'	JFA

2019.06.05	Japan	0–0	Trinidad and Tobago	Aichi
		JFA

2019.06.09	Japan	2–0	El Salvador	Miyagi
	Nagai 19', 41'	JFA

2019.06.17	Japan	0–4	Chile	Brazil
		JFA	? 41' ? 54' ? 82' ? 83'

2019.06.20	Japan	2–2	Uruguay	Brazil
	Miyoshi 25', 59'	JFA	? 32' ? 66'

2019.06.24	Japan	1–1	Ecuador	Brazil
	Nakajima 15'	JFA	? 35'

2019.09.05	Japan	2–0	Paraguay	Ibaraki
	Osako 23'; Minamino 30'	JFA

2019.09.10	Japan	2–0	Myanmar	Myanmar
	Nakajima 16'; Minamino 26'	JFA

2019.10.10	Japan	6–0	Mongolia	Saitama
	Minamino 22'; Yoshida 29'; Nagatomo 33'; Nagai 40'; Endo 56'; Kamada 82'	JFA

2019.10.15	Japan	3–0	Tajikistan	Tajikistan
	Minamino 53', 56'; Asano 82'	JFA

2019.11.14	Japan	2–0	Kyrgyzstan	Kyrgyzstan
	Minamino 41'; Haraguchi 54'	JFA

2019.11.19	Japan	1–4	Venezuela	Osaka
	Yamaguchi 69'	JFA	? 8' ? 30' ? 33' ? 38'

2019.12.10	Japan	2–1	China	South Korea
	Suzuki 29'; Miura 70'	JFA	? 90'

2019.12.14	Japan	5–0	Hong Kong	South Korea
	Suga 8'; Tagawa 14'; Ogawa 26', 45', 58'	JFA

2019.12.18	Japan	0–1	South Korea	South Korea
		JFA	? 28'

=== Players statistics ===
Player	-2018	01.09	01.13	01.17	01.21	01.24	01.28	02.01	03.22	03.26	06.05	06.09	06.17	06.20	06.24	09.05	09.10	10.10	10.15	11.14	11.19	12.10	12.14	12.18	2019	Total
Shinji Okazaki	116(50)	-	-	-	-	-	-	-	-	-	-	-	O	O	O	-	-	-	-	-	-	-	-	-	3(0)	119(50)
Yuto Nagatomo	110(3)	O	O	-	O	O	O	O	-	-	O	-	-	-	-	O	O	O(1)	O	O	-	-	-	-	12(1)	122(4)
Shinji Kagawa	95(31)	-	-	-	-	-	-	-	O	O	-	-	-	-	-	-	-	-	-	-	-	-	-	-	2(0)	97(31)
Maya Yoshida	89(10)	O	O	-	O	O	O	O	-	-	-	-	-	-	-	O	O	O(1)	O	O	-	-	-	-	11(1)	100(11)
Eiji Kawashima	88(0)	-	-	-	-	-	-	-	-	-	-	-	-	O	O	-	-	-	-	-	O	-	-	-	3(0)	91(0)
Hiroki Sakai	49(1)	O	O	-	O	O	O	O	-	-	O	-	-	-	-	O	O	O	O	O	-	-	-	-	12(0)	61(1)
Hotaru Yamaguchi	45(2)	-	-	-	-	-	-	-	O	-	-	-	-	-	-	-	-	-	-	O	O(1)	-	-	-	3(1)	48(3)
Genki Haraguchi	40(8)	O	O(1)	O	O	O	O(1)	O	-	-	O	O	-	-	-	O	-	O	-	O(1)	O	-	-	-	13(3)	53(11)
Yuya Osako	37(10)	O(2)	-	-	-	O	O(2)	O	-	-	O	O	-	-	-	O(1)	O	-	-	-	-	-	-	-	8(5)	45(15)
Tomoaki Makino	36(4)	O	-	O	-	-	-	-	-	-	-	-	-	-	-	-	-	-	-	-	-	-	-	-	2(0)	38(4)
Takashi Inui	31(6)	-	-	O	-	O	-	O	O	O	-	-	-	-	-	-	-	-	-	-	-	-	-	-	5(0)	36(6)
Gaku Shibasaki	26(3)	O	O	-	O	O	O	O	O	O	O	O	O	O	O	O	O	O	O	O	O	-	-	-	19(0)	45(3)
Takashi Usami	26(3)	-	-	-	-	-	-	-	-	O	-	-	-	-	-	-	-	-	-	-	-	-	-	-	1(0)	27(3)
Yoshinori Muto	25(2)	-	O	O(1)	O	-	-	O	-	-	-	-	-	-	-	-	-	-	-	-	-	-	-	-	4(1)	29(3)
Takuma Asano	18(3)	-	-	-	-	-	-	-	-	-	-	-	-	-	-	-	-	-	O(1)	-	O	-	-	-	2(1)	20(4)
Gen Shoji	15(1)	-	-	-	-	-	-	-	O	-	O	O	-	-	-	-	-	-	-	-	-	-	-	-	3(0)	18(1)
Wataru Endo	15(0)	-	O	O	O	O	O	-	-	-	-	-	-	-	-	-	-	O(1)	-	O	-	-	-	-	7(1)	22(1)
Yosuke Ideguchi	12(2)	-	-	-	-	-	-	-	-	-	-	-	-	-	-	-	-	-	-	-	O	O	-	O	3(0)	15(2)
Toshihiro Aoyama	11(1)	-	-	O	-	-	-	-	-	-	-	-	-	-	-	-	-	-	-	-	-	-	-	-	1(0)	12(1)
Takumi Minamino	7(4)	O	O	-	O	O	O	O(1)	O	O	O	O	-	-	-	O(1)	O(1)	O(1)	O(2)	O(1)	-	-	-	-	15(7)	22(11)
Junya Ito	7(2)	-	O	O	O	-	O	O	-	-	O	O	-	-	-	-	O	O	-	O	-	-	-	-	10(0)	17(2)
Masaaki Higashiguchi	7(0)	-	-	-	-	-	-	-	O	-	-	-	-	-	-	-	-	-	-	-	-	-	-	-	1(0)	8(0)
Shoya Nakajima	6(2)	-	-	-	-	-	-	-	O	O(1)	O	O	O	O	O(1)	O	O(1)	O	O	O	O	-	-	-	13(3)	19(5)
Kensuke Nagai	6(0)	-	-	-	-	-	-	-	-	-	-	O(2)	-	-	-	O	-	O(1)	O	O	O	-	-	-	6(3)	12(3)
Ritsu Doan	5(1)	O(1)	O	-	O	O(1)	O	O	O	O	O	O	-	-	-	O	O	-	O	-	-	-	-	-	13(2)	18(3)
Shuichi Gonda	5(0)	O	O	-	O	O	O	O	-	-	-	-	-	-	-	O	O	O	O	O	-	-	-	-	11(0)	16(0)
Genta Miura	5(0)	-	-	O	-	-	-	-	-	O	-	-	-	-	-	-	-	-	-	-	O	O(1)	-	O	5(1)	10(1)
Ryota Oshima	5(0)	-	-	-	-	-	-	-	-	-	-	-	-	-	-	-	-	-	-	-	-	-	O	O	2(0)	7(0)
Yuki Kobayashi	4(1)	-	-	-	-	-	-	-	O	O	O	O	-	-	-	-	-	-	-	-	-	-	-	-	4(0)	8(1)
Naomichi Ueda	4(0)	-	-	-	-	-	-	-	-	-	-	-	O	O	O	O	-	-	O	O	O	-	-	-	7(0)	11(0)
Sei Muroya	4(0)	-	-	O	-	-	O	-	O	-	O	O	-	-	-	-	-	-	-	-	O	-	-	-	6(0)	10(0)
Kosuke Nakamura	4(0)	-	-	-	-	-	-	-	-	-	-	-	-	-	-	-	-	-	-	-	-	O	-	O	2(0)	6(0)
Sho Sasaki	3(0)	-	-	O	-	-	-	-	O	O	-	-	-	-	-	-	-	-	-	-	O	O	-	O	6(0)	9(0)
Koya Kitagawa	3(0)	O	O	O	O	O	-	-	-	-	-	-	-	-	-	-	-	-	-	-	-	-	-	-	5(0)	8(0)
Takehiro Tomiyasu	2(0)	O	O	O	O(1)	O	O	O	O	-	O	O	O	O	O	O	O	O	-	-	-	-	-	-	16(1)	18(1)
Tsukasa Shiotani	2(0)	-	-	O(1)	O	O	O	O	-	-	-	-	-	-	-	-	-	-	-	-	-	-	-	-	5(1)	7(1)
Hidemasa Morita	2(0)	-	-	-	-	-	-	-	-	-	O	-	-	-	-	-	-	-	-	-	-	-	-	-	1(0)	3(0)
Ryosuke Yamanaka	1(1)	-	-	-	-	-	-	-	-	-	-	O	-	-	-	-	-	-	-	-	-	-	-	-	1(0)	2(1)
Daniel Schmidt	1(0)	-	-	O	-	-	-	-	-	O	O	O	-	-	-	-	-	-	-	-	-	-	-	-	4(0)	5(0)
Daigo Nishi	1(0)	-	-	-	-	-	-	-	-	O	-	-	-	-	-	-	-	-	-	-	-	-	-	-	1(0)	2(0)
Musashi Suzuki	0(0)	-	-	-	-	-	-	-	O	O	-	-	-	-	-	-	O	-	-	O	O	O(1)	-	O	7(1)	7(1)
Shinnosuke Hatanaka	0(0)	-	-	-	-	-	-	-	-	O	O	O	-	-	-	-	-	-	-	-	O	O	O	O	7(0)	7(0)
Kento Hashimoto	0(0)	-	-	-	-	-	-	-	-	O	-	O	-	-	-	O	O	-	O	-	O	O	-	-	7(0)	7(0)
Takefusa Kubo	0(0)	-	-	-	-	-	-	-	-	-	-	O	O	O	O	O	O	-	O	-	-	-	-	-	7(0)	7(0)
Ayase Ueda	0(0)	-	-	-	-	-	-	-	-	-	-	-	O	O	O	-	-	-	-	-	-	O	O	O	6(0)	6(0)
Daichi Kamada	0(0)	-	-	-	-	-	-	-	O	O	-	-	-	-	-	-	-	O(1)	O	-	-	-	-	-	4(1)	4(1)
Koki Anzai	0(0)	-	-	-	-	-	-	-	O	O	-	-	-	-	-	O	-	O	-	-	-	-	-	-	4(0)	4(0)
Koji Miyoshi	0(0)	-	-	-	-	-	-	-	-	-	-	-	O	O(2)	O	-	-	-	-	-	-	-	-	-	3(2)	3(2)
Daiki Sugioka	0(0)	-	-	-	-	-	-	-	-	-	-	-	O	O	O	-	-	-	-	-	-	-	-	-	3(0)	3(0)
Hiroki Abe	0(0)	-	-	-	-	-	-	-	-	-	-	-	O	O	O	-	-	-	-	-	-	-	-	-	3(0)	3(0)
Ko Itakura	0(0)	-	-	-	-	-	-	-	-	-	-	-	-	O	O	O	-	-	-	-	-	-	-	-	3(0)	3(0)
Yuki Soma	0(0)	-	-	-	-	-	-	-	-	-	-	-	-	-	-	-	-	-	-	-	-	O	O	O	3(0)	3(0)
Kyosuke Tagawa	0(0)	-	-	-	-	-	-	-	-	-	-	-	-	-	-	-	-	-	-	-	-	O	O(1)	-	2(1)	2(1)
Daizen Maeda	0(0)	-	-	-	-	-	-	-	-	-	-	-	O	-	O	-	-	-	-	-	-	-	-	-	2(0)	2(0)
Keisuke Osako	0(0)	-	-	-	-	-	-	-	-	-	-	-	O	-	-	-	-	-	-	-	-	-	O	-	2(0)	2(0)
Tomoki Iwata	0(0)	-	-	-	-	-	-	-	-	-	-	-	-	O	O	-	-	-	-	-	-	-	-	-	2(0)	2(0)
Daiki Hashioka	0(0)	-	-	-	-	-	-	-	-	-	-	-	-	-	-	-	-	-	-	-	-	O	-	O	2(0)	2(0)
Keita Endo	0(0)	-	-	-	-	-	-	-	-	-	-	-	-	-	-	-	-	-	-	-	-	O	-	O	2(0)	2(0)
Tsukasa Morishima	0(0)	-	-	-	-	-	-	-	-	-	-	-	-	-	-	-	-	-	-	-	-	O	-	O	2(0)	2(0)
Ao Tanaka	0(0)	-	-	-	-	-	-	-	-	-	-	-	-	-	-	-	-	-	-	-	-	-	O	O	2(0)	2(0)
Teruhito Nakagawa	0(0)	-	-	-	-	-	-	-	-	-	-	-	-	-	-	-	-	-	-	-	-	-	O	O	2(0)	2(0)
Koki Ogawa	0(0)	-	-	-	-	-	-	-	-	-	-	-	-	-	-	-	-	-	-	-	-	-	O(3)	-	1(3)	1(3)
Daiki Suga	0(0)	-	-	-	-	-	-	-	-	-	-	-	-	-	-	-	-	-	-	-	-	-	O(1)	-	1(1)	1(1)
Teruki Hara	0(0)	-	-	-	-	-	-	-	-	-	-	-	O	-	-	-	-	-	-	-	-	-	-	-	1(0)	1(0)
Yuta Nakayama	0(0)	-	-	-	-	-	-	-	-	-	-	-	O	-	-	-	-	-	-	-	-	-	-	-	1(0)	1(0)
Yugo Tatsuta	0(0)	-	-	-	-	-	-	-	-	-	-	-	-	O	-	-	-	-	-	-	-	-	-	-	1(0)	1(0)
Kyogo Furuhashi	0(0)	-	-	-	-	-	-	-	-	-	-	-	-	-	-	-	-	-	-	-	O	-	-	-	1(0)	1(0)
Tsuyoshi Watanabe	0(0)	-	-	-	-	-	-	-	-	-	-	-	-	-	-	-	-	-	-	-	-	-	O	-	1(0)	1(0)
Shunta Tanaka	0(0)	-	-	-	-	-	-	-	-	-	-	-	-	-	-	-	-	-	-	-	-	-	O	-	1(0)	1(0)
Taiyo Koga	0(0)	-	-	-	-	-	-	-	-	-	-	-	-	-	-	-	-	-	-	-	-	-	O	-	1(0)	1(0)

== National team (Women) ==
=== Results ===
2019.02.27	Japan	2–2	United States	United States
	Nakajima 67'; Momiki 90'	JFA	? 23' ? 76'

2019.03.02	Japan	3–1	Brazil	United States
	Momiki 44'; Kobayashi 81'; Hasegawa 85'	JFA	? 57'

2019.03.05	Japan	0–3	England	United States
		JFA	? 12' ? 23' ? 30'

2019.04.04	Japan	1–3	France	France
	Kobayashi 24'	JFA	? 3' ? 33' ? 82'

2019.04.09	Japan	2–2	Germany	Germany
	Hasegawa 35'; Yokoyama 69'	JFA	? 53' ? 72'

2019.06.02	Japan	1–1	Spain	France
	Sugasawa 86'	JFA	? 22'

2019.06.10	Japan	0–0	Argentina	France
		JFA

2019.06.14	Japan	2–1	Scotland	France
	Iwabuchi 23'; Sugasawa 37'	JFA	? 88'

2019.06.19	Japan	0–2	England	France
		JFA	? 14' ? 84'

2019.06.25	Japan	1–2	Netherlands	France
	Hasegawa 43'	JFA	? 17' ? 90'

2019.10.06	Japan	4–0	Canada	Shizuoka
	Iwabuchi 6'; Momiki 65'; Hasegawa 72'; Kobayashi 90'	JFA

2019.11.10	Japan	2–0	South Africa	Fukuoka
	Kumagai 20'; Sugasawa 41'	JFA

2019.12.11	Japan	9–0	Chinese Taipei	South Korea
	Iwabuchi 7', 71'; Tanaka 9', 38'; Kobayashi 16'; Matsubara 44'; Ikejiri 54', 90'; Seike 66'	JFA

2019.12.14	Japan	3–0	China	South Korea
	Iwabuchi 9', 44', 55'	JFA

2019.12.17	Japan	1–0	South Korea	South Korea
	Momiki 88'	JFA

=== Players statistics ===
Player	-2018	02.27	03.02	03.05	04.04	04.09	06.02	06.10	06.14	06.19	06.25	10.06	11.10	12.11	12.14	12.17	2019	Total
Rumi Utsugi	111(6)	-	O	-	-	-	O	-	-	-	-	-	-	-	-	-	2(0)	113(6)
Aya Sameshima	103(5)	O	O	O	O	O	O	O	O	O	O	-	-	-	-	-	10(0)	113(5)
Saki Kumagai	100(0)	O	-	-	O	O	O	O	O	O	O	O	O(1)	-	-	-	10(1)	110(1)
Emi Nakajima	65(13)	O(1)	O	-	O	O	O	O	O	O	O	O	O	O	-	O	13(1)	78(14)
Saori Ariyoshi	63(1)	O	O	-	-	-	-	-	-	-	-	-	-	-	-	-	2(0)	65(1)
Mana Iwabuchi	61(20)	-	-	-	-	-	-	O	O(1)	O	O	O(1)	O	O(2)	O(3)	-	8(7)	69(27)
Yuika Sugasawa	60(17)	-	-	-	O	O	O(1)	O	O(1)	O	O	O	O(1)	-	-	-	9(3)	69(20)
Kumi Yokoyama	35(16)	O	O	O	O	O(1)	O	O	-	O	-	-	-	-	-	-	8(1)	43(17)
Mina Tanaka	35(14)	-	-	-	-	-	-	-	-	-	-	O	-	O(2)	O	O	4(2)	39(16)
Yui Hasegawa	30(4)	O	O(1)	O	O	O(1)	O	O	O	-	O(1)	O(1)	O	-	O	-	12(4)	42(8)
Ayaka Yamashita	25(0)	-	-	-	O	-	O	O	O	O	O	O	O	-	O	O	10(0)	35(0)
Erina Yamane	23(0)	O	O	O	-	-	-	-	-	-	-	-	-	-	-	-	3(0)	26(0)
Yuka Momiki	21(6)	O(1)	O(1)	O	-	-	O	-	-	-	O	O(1)	O	-	O	O(1)	9(4)	30(10)
Risa Shimizu	19(0)	O	-	O	O	O	O	O	O	O	O	O	O	-	O	-	12(0)	31(0)
Hikaru Naomoto	18(0)	-	-	-	-	O	-	-	-	-	-	-	O	-	-	-	2(0)	20(0)
Shiori Miyake	17(0)	-	-	-	-	-	O	-	-	-	-	-	O	O	-	O	4(0)	21(0)
Nana Ichise	15(0)	-	-	-	-	-	O	-	O	O	O	-	-	-	-	-	4(0)	19(0)
Sakiko Ikeda	14(0)	-	-	-	-	-	-	-	-	-	-	-	-	O	-	-	1(0)	15(0)
Moeno Sakaguchi	10(1)	-	O	O	-	-	-	-	-	-	-	-	-	-	-	-	2(0)	12(1)
Narumi Miura	5(0)	-	-	O	O	O	O	O	O	O	O	O	O	-	O	O	12(0)	17(0)
Mami Ueno	3(0)	-	-	-	-	-	-	-	-	-	-	-	-	O	O	O	3(0)	6(0)
Hina Sugita	1(0)	O	O	O	O	O	O	O	O	O	O	O	O	-	O	O	14(0)	15(0)
Hinata Miyazawa	1(0)	-	-	-	O	-	-	-	-	-	-	-	-	-	-	-	1(0)	2(0)
Chika Hirao	1(0)	-	-	-	-	O	-	-	-	-	-	-	-	-	-	-	1(0)	2(0)
Mayo Doko	1(0)	-	-	-	-	-	-	-	-	-	-	-	O	-	-	-	1(0)	2(0)
Rikako Kobayashi	0(0)	O	O(1)	O	O(1)	O	-	-	O	O	-	O(1)	O	O(1)	O	O	12(4)	12(4)
Jun Endo	0(0)	O	O	O	-	O	O	O	O	O	-	O	O	O	-	O	12(0)	12(0)
Moeka Minami	0(0)	-	O	O	O	O	O	O	-	-	-	O	-	O	O	O	10(0)	10(0)
Asato Miyagawa	0(0)	-	O	O	O	O	O	-	-	-	-	O	O	-	O	O	9(0)	9(0)
Mayu Ikejiri	0(0)	O	O	O	-	-	-	-	-	-	-	-	-	O(2)	O	O	6(2)	6(2)
Arisa Matsubara	0(0)	O	-	O	-	-	-	-	-	-	-	-	-	O(1)	O	-	4(1)	4(1)
Risako Oga	0(0)	O	O	O	-	-	-	-	-	-	-	-	-	-	-	-	3(0)	3(0)
Riko Ueki	0(0)	-	-	-	O	O	-	-	-	-	-	-	O	-	-	-	3(0)	3(0)
Saori Takarada	0(0)	-	-	-	-	-	-	O	-	O	O	-	-	-	-	-	3(0)	3(0)
Kiko Seike	0(0)	-	-	-	-	-	-	-	-	-	-	-	-	O(1)	-	O	2(1)	2(1)
Hana Takahashi	0(0)	-	-	-	-	-	-	-	-	-	-	O	-	-	-	-	1(0)	1(0)
Akari Kurishima	0(0)	-	-	-	-	-	-	-	-	-	-	-	-	O	-	-	1(0)	1(0)
Honoka Hayashi	0(0)	-	-	-	-	-	-	-	-	-	-	-	-	O	-	-	1(0)	1(0)
