= 2014 in Japanese football =

2014 season

Japanese football in 2014.

== J.League Division 1 ==
| Pos | Team | Pld | W | D | L | GF | GA | GD | Pts | Qualification or relegation |
|---|---|---|---|---|---|---|---|---|---|---|
| 1 | Gamba Osaka (C) | 34 | 19 | 6 | 9 | 59 | 31 | +28 | 63 | Qualification for 2015 AFC Champions League group stage (Note: Because Gamba Osaka also won the 2014 Emperor's Cup, the group stage spot has been given to third-placed Kashima Antlers, while ACL qualification spot was awarded to the fourth-placed Kashiwa Reysol.) |
| 2 | Urawa Red Diamonds | 34 | 18 | 8 | 8 | 52 | 32 | +20 | 62 | Qualification for 2015 AFC Champions League group stage |
| 3 | Kashima Antlers | 34 | 18 | 6 | 10 | 64 | 39 | +25 | 60 | Qualification for 2015 AFC Champions League group stage |
| 4 | Kashiwa Reysol | 34 | 17 | 9 | 8 | 48 | 40 | +8 | 60 | Qualification for 2015 AFC Champions League Third qualifying round |
| 5 | Sagan Tosu | 34 | 19 | 3 | 12 | 41 | 33 | +8 | 60 | |
| 6 | Kawasaki Frontale | 34 | 16 | 7 | 11 | 56 | 43 | +13 | 55 | |
| 7 | Yokohama F. Marinos | 34 | 14 | 9 | 11 | 37 | 29 | +8 | 51 | |
| 8 | Sanfrecce Hiroshima | 34 | 13 | 11 | 10 | 44 | 37 | +7 | 50 | |
| 9 | FC Tokyo | 34 | 12 | 12 | 10 | 47 | 33 | +14 | 48 | |
| 10 | Nagoya Grampus | 34 | 13 | 9 | 12 | 47 | 48 | −1 | 48 | |
| 11 | Vissel Kobe | 34 | 11 | 12 | 11 | 49 | 50 | −1 | 45 | |
| 12 | Albirex Niigata | 34 | 12 | 8 | 14 | 30 | 36 | −6 | 44 | |
| 13 | Ventforet Kofu | 34 | 9 | 14 | 11 | 27 | 31 | −4 | 41 | |
| 14 | Vegalta Sendai | 34 | 9 | 11 | 14 | 35 | 50 | −15 | 38 | |
| 15 | Shimizu S-Pulse | 34 | 10 | 6 | 18 | 42 | 60 | −18 | 36 | |
| 16 | Omiya Ardija (R) | 34 | 9 | 8 | 17 | 44 | 60 | −16 | 35 | Relegation to 2015 J2 League |
| 17 | Cerezo Osaka (R) | 34 | 7 | 10 | 17 | 36 | 48 | −12 | 31 | Relegation to 2015 J2 League |
| 18 | Tokushima Vortis (R) | 34 | 3 | 5 | 26 | 16 | 74 | −58 | 14 | Relegation to 2015 J2 League |

Updated to match(es) played on 8 December 2014. Source: J.League Data
Rules for classification: 1) points; 2) goal difference; 3) number of goals scored.
(C) Champions; (R) Relegated

== J.League Division 2 ==
| Pos | Team | Pld | W | D | L | GF | GA | GD | Pts | Promotion or relegation |
|---|---|---|---|---|---|---|---|---|---|---|
| 1 | Shonan Bellmare (C, P) | 42 | 31 | 8 | 3 | 86 | 25 | +61 | 101 | Qualification for 2015 J1 League |
| 2 | Matsumoto Yamaga (P) | 42 | 24 | 11 | 7 | 65 | 35 | +30 | 83 | Qualification for 2015 J1 League |
| 3 | JEF United Chiba | 42 | 18 | 14 | 10 | 55 | 44 | +11 | 68 | Qualification for Promotion Playoffs (Note: Only teams that meet J1 license criteria can participate in promotion playoffs. If one or more teams fail to meet the criteria, only eligible teams that finished 3rd to 6th will participate and no replacement teams will be added.) |
| 4 | Júbilo Iwata | 42 | 18 | 13 | 11 | 67 | 55 | +12 | 67 | Qualification for Promotion Playoffs |
| 5 | Giravanz Kitakyushu | 42 | 18 | 11 | 13 | 50 | 50 | 0 | 65 | Ineligible for promotion |
| 6 | Montedio Yamagata (P) | 42 | 18 | 10 | 14 | 57 | 44 | +13 | 64 | Qualification for Promotion Playoffs |
| 7 | Oita Trinita | 42 | 17 | 12 | 13 | 52 | 55 | −3 | 63 | |
| 8 | Fagiano Okayama | 42 | 15 | 16 | 11 | 52 | 48 | +4 | 61 | |
| 9 | Kyoto Sanga | 42 | 14 | 18 | 10 | 57 | 52 | +5 | 60 | |
| 10 | Consadole Sapporo | 42 | 15 | 14 | 13 | 48 | 44 | +4 | 59 | |
| 11 | Yokohama FC | 42 | 14 | 13 | 15 | 49 | 47 | +2 | 55 | |
| 12 | Tochigi SC | 42 | 15 | 10 | 17 | 52 | 58 | −6 | 55 | |
| 13 | Roasso Kumamoto | 42 | 13 | 15 | 14 | 45 | 53 | −8 | 54 | |
| 14 | V-Varen Nagasaki | 42 | 12 | 16 | 14 | 45 | 42 | +3 | 52 | |
| 15 | Mito HollyHock | 42 | 12 | 14 | 16 | 46 | 46 | 0 | 50 | Ineligible for promotion |
| 16 | Avispa Fukuoka | 42 | 13 | 11 | 18 | 52 | 60 | −8 | 50 | |
| 17 | FC Gifu | 42 | 13 | 10 | 19 | 54 | 61 | −7 | 49 | Ineligible for promotion |
| 18 | Thespakusatsu Gunma | 42 | 14 | 7 | 21 | 45 | 54 | −9 | 49 | |
| 19 | Ehime FC | 42 | 12 | 12 | 18 | 54 | 58 | −4 | 48 | |
| 20 | Tokyo Verdy | 42 | 9 | 15 | 18 | 31 | 48 | −17 | 42 | |
| 21 | Kamatamare Sanuki | 42 | 7 | 12 | 23 | 34 | 71 | −37 | 33 | Qualification for Relegation Playoffs (Note: The playoffs and direct exchange between J2 and J3 are subject to eligibility of J2-licensed teams in top 2 of 2014 J3 League) |
| 22 | Kataller Toyama (R) | 42 | 5 | 8 | 29 | 28 | 74 | −46 | 23 | Relegation to 2015 J3 League |

Updated to match(es) played on 23 November 2014. Source: J.League data
Rules for classification: 1) points; 2) goal difference; 3) number of goals scored.
(C) Champions; (P) Promoted; (R) Relegated

== J3 League ==
| Pos | Team | Pld | W | D | L | GF | GA | GD | Pts | Promotion or relegation |
|---|---|---|---|---|---|---|---|---|---|---|
| 1 | Zweigen Kanazawa (C, P) | 33 | 23 | 6 | 4 | 56 | 20 | +36 | 75 | Promotion to 2015 J2 League (Note: Only clubs that hold J2 licence are eligible for promotion.) |
| 2 | Nagano Parceiro | 33 | 20 | 9 | 4 | 58 | 23 | +35 | 69 | Qualification for J2 promotion playoffs |
| 3 | Machida Zelvia | 33 | 20 | 8 | 5 | 59 | 22 | +37 | 68 | |
| 4 | Gainare Tottori | 33 | 14 | 11 | 8 | 34 | 25 | +9 | 53 | |
| 5 | Grulla Morioka | 33 | 12 | 9 | 12 | 43 | 39 | +4 | 45 | |
| 6 | SC Sagamihara | 33 | 12 | 7 | 14 | 44 | 48 | −4 | 43 | |
| 7 | Fukushima United | 33 | 9 | 9 | 15 | 30 | 38 | −8 | 36 | |
| 8 | Blaublitz Akita | 33 | 10 | 4 | 19 | 38 | 57 | −19 | 34 | |
| 9 | FC Ryukyu | 33 | 8 | 10 | 15 | 31 | 50 | −19 | 34 | |
| 10 | J.League U-22 Selection | 33 | 9 | 6 | 18 | 37 | 63 | −26 | 33 | |
| 11 | Fujieda MYFC | 33 | 7 | 9 | 17 | 36 | 52 | −16 | 30 | |
| 12 | YSCC Yokohama | 33 | 4 | 12 | 17 | 29 | 58 | −29 | 24 | |

Source: J.League
Rules for classification: 1) Points; 2) Goal differential; 3) Goals scored; 4) Head-to-head results; 5) Disciplinary points; 6) Draw.
(C) Champions; (P) Promoted

== Japan Football League ==
| Pos | Team | Pld | W | D | L | GF | GA | GD | Pts | Promotion or relegation |
|---|---|---|---|---|---|---|---|---|---|---|
| 1 | Honda FC (C) | 26 | 16 | 5 | 5 | 58 | 28 | +30 | 53 | |
| 2 | SP Kyoto FC | 26 | 20 | 1 | 5 | 58 | 20 | +38 | 61 | |
| 3 | Kagoshima United | 26 | 18 | 3 | 5 | 45 | 19 | +26 | 57 | |
| 4 | Renofa Yamaguchi (P) | 26 | 16 | 3 | 7 | 51 | 27 | +24 | 51 | Promotion to 2015 J3 League |
| 5 | Sony Sendai | 26 | 13 | 7 | 6 | 45 | 29 | +16 | 46 | |
| 6 | Yokogawa Musashino | 26 | 9 | 8 | 9 | 31 | 31 | 0 | 35 | |
| 7 | Verspah Oita | 26 | 8 | 9 | 9 | 30 | 28 | +2 | 33 | |
| 8 | Azul Claro Numazu | 26 | 8 | 8 | 10 | 26 | 35 | −9 | 32 | |
| 9 | Vanraure Hachinohe | 26 | 8 | 6 | 12 | 30 | 32 | −2 | 30 | |
| 10 | Honda Lock | 26 | 7 | 6 | 13 | 31 | 52 | −21 | 27 | |
| 11 | Fagiano Okayama Next | 26 | 5 | 8 | 13 | 24 | 46 | −22 | 23 | |
| 12 | MIO Biwako Shiga | 26 | 6 | 4 | 16 | 24 | 50 | −26 | 22 | |
| 13 | Tochigi Uva | 26 | 4 | 7 | 15 | 16 | 37 | −21 | 19 | |
| 14 | Maruyasu Okazaki | 26 | 3 | 7 | 16 | 23 | 58 | −35 | 16 | |

Updated to match(es) played on 30 November 2014. Source: Japan Football League
Rules for classification: 1) Points; 2) Goal differential; 3) Goals scored; 4) Head-to-head results; 5) Disciplinary points; 6) Draw.
(C) Champions; (P) Promoted

== National team (Men) ==
=== Results ===
| 5 March | Japan | 4–2 | New Zealand | Tokyo, Japan |
| 19:40 JST | Okazaki 4', 17'; Kagawa 7' (pen.); Morishige 11' | JFA Report | Wood 39', 80' | Stadium: National Stadium; Attendance: 47,670; Referee: Alan Milliner (Australia) |

| 27 May | Japan | 1–0 | Cyprus | Saitama, Japan |
| 19:30 JST | Uchida 43' | JFA Report | | Stadium: Saitama Stadium; Attendance: 58,564; Referee: Paweł Raczkowski (Poland) |

| 2 June | Costa Rica | 1–3 | Japan | Tampa, United States |
| 21:00 UTC−4 | Ruiz 31' | JFA Report | Endo 60'; Kagawa 80'; Kakitani 90+2' | Stadium: Raymond James Stadium; Attendance: 7,106; Referee: Chris Penso (USA) |

| 6 June | Zambia | 3–4 | Japan | Tampa, United States |
| 19:30 UTC−4 | Katongo 9'; Sinkala 29'; Musonda 89' | JFA Report | Honda 40' (pen.), 75'; Kagawa 73'; Okubo 90+1' | Stadium: Raymond James Stadium; Attendance: 7,275; Referee: Edvin Jurisevic (USA) |

| 14 June Group C | Ivory Coast | 2–1 | Japan | Recife, Brazil |
| 22:00 UTC−3 | Bony 64'; Gervinho 66' | FIFA Report | Honda 16' | Stadium: Arena Pernambuco; Attendance: 40,267; Referee: Enrique Osses (Chile) |

| 19 June Group C | Japan | 0–0 | Greece | Natal, Brazil |
| 19:00 UTC−3 | | FIFA Report | | Stadium: Arena das Dunas; Attendance: 39,485; Referee: Joel Aguilar (El Salvador) |

| 24 June Group C | Japan | 1–4 | Colombia | Cuiabá, Brazil |
| 16:00 UTC−4 | Okazaki 45+1' | FIFA Report | Cuadrado 17' (pen.); Martínez 55', 82'; Rodríguez 90' | Stadium: Arena Pantanal; Attendance: 40,340; Referee: Pedro Proença (Portugal) |

| 5 September | Japan | 0–2 | Uruguay | Sapporo, Japan |
| 19:30 JST | | JFA Report | Cavani 34'; Hernández 71' | Stadium: Sapporo Dome; Attendance: 39,294; Referee: Kim Sang-woo (South Korea) |

| 9 September | Japan | 2–2 | Venezuela | Yokohama, Japan |
| 19:20 JST | Muto 51'; Shibasaki 66' | FIFA Listing | Rondon 61' (pen.); Cichero 71' | Stadium: International Stadium Yokohama; Attendance: 64,007; Referee: Chris Beath (Australia) |

| 10 October | Japan | 1–0 | Jamaica | Niigata, Japan |
| 19:25 JST | Nosworthy 16' (o.g.) | JFA Report | | Stadium: Denka Big Swan Stadium; Attendance: 39,628; Referee: Ma Ning (China) |

| 14 October | Japan | 0–4 | Brazil | Singapore |
| 18:45 UTC+8 | | JFA Report | Neymar 18', 48', 77', 81' | Stadium: Singapore National Stadium; Attendance: 51,577; Referee: Ahmad A'Qashah (Singapore) |

| 14 November | Japan | 6–0 | Honduras | Toyota, Japan |
| 19:35 JST | Yoshida 9'; Honda 40'; Endō 44'; Inui 47', 74'; Toyoda 69' | Report | | Stadium: Toyota Stadium; Attendance: 42,126; Referee: Bartosz Frankowski (Poland) |

| 18 November | Japan | 2–1 | Australia | Osaka, Japan |
| 19:25 JST | Konno 61'; Okazaki 68' | JFA Report | Cahill 90+2' | Stadium: Nagai Stadium; Attendance: 46,312; Referee: Paweł Gil (Poland) |

Win Draw Loss

=== Players statistics ===
| Player | -2013 | 03.05 | 05.27 | 06.02 | 06.06 | 06.14 | 06.19 | 06.24 | 09.05 | 09.09 | 10.10 | 10.14 | 11.14 | 11.18 | 2014 | Total |
| Yasuhito Endo | 140(12) | O | O | O(1) | O | O | O | - | - | - | - | - | O(1) | O | 8(2) | 148(14) |
| Yasuyuki Konno | 78(1) | - | O | O | O | - | O | O | - | - | - | - | - | O(1) | 6(1) | 84(2) |
| Makoto Hasebe | 77(2) | - | O | - | - | O | O | O | - | - | - | - | O | O | 6(0) | 83(2) |
| Shinji Okazaki | 72(36) | O(2) | O | O | O | O | O | O(1) | O | O | O | O | O | O(1) | 13(4) | 85(40) |
| Yuto Nagatomo | 66(3) | O | O | O | O | O | O | O | O | O | O | - | - | - | 10(0) | 76(3) |
| Atsuto Uchida | 65(1) | - | O(1) | O | O | O | O | O | - | - | - | - | O | - | 7(1) | 72(2) |
| Yoshito Okubo | 54(5) | - | O | O | O(1) | O | O | O | - | - | - | - | - | - | 6(1) | 60(6) |
| Shinji Kagawa | 53(16) | O(1) | O | O(1) | O(1) | O | O | O | - | - | O | - | O | O | 10(3) | 63(19) |
| Eiji Kawashima | 53(0) | O | O | O | - | O | O | O | O | O | - | O | O | O | 11(0) | 64(0) |
| Keisuke Honda | 52(20) | O | O | O | O(2) | O(1) | O | O | O | O | O | O | O(1) | O | 13(4) | 65(24) |
| Maya Yoshida | 37(2) | O | O | O | O | O | O | O | O | O | - | - | O(1) | O | 11(1) | 48(3) |
| Hajime Hosogai | 25(1) | O | - | - | - | - | - | - | O | O | O | O | - | - | 5(0) | 30(1) |
| Hiroshi Kiyotake | 23(1) | O | O | - | - | - | - | O | - | - | - | - | - | - | 3(0) | 26(1) |
| Masahiko Inoha | 20(1) | - | O | - | - | - | - | - | - | - | - | - | - | - | 1(0) | 21(1) |
| Hiroki Sakai | 14(0) | O | O | O | O | - | - | - | O | - | - | - | - | - | 5(0) | 19(0) |
| Shusaku Nishikawa | 12(0) | - | - | - | O | - | - | - | - | - | O | - | O | - | 3(0) | 15(0) |
| Takashi Inui | 12(0) | - | - | - | - | - | - | - | - | - | - | - | O(2) | O | 2(2) | 14(2) |
| Gotoku Sakai | 11(0) | O | - | - | - | - | - | - | O | O | O | O | O | O | 7(0) | 18(0) |
| Yoichiro Kakitani | 9(4) | - | O | O(1) | O | O | - | O | O | O | O | O | - | - | 9(1) | 18(5) |
| Hotaru Yamaguchi | 8(0) | O | O | O | O | O | O | O | - | - | - | - | - | - | 7(0) | 15(0) |
| Yuya Osako | 6(3) | O | - | O | O | O | O | - | - | O | - | - | - | - | 6(0) | 12(3) |
| Masato Morishige | 6(0) | O(1) | O | O | O | O | - | - | O | O | O | O | O | O | 11(1) | 17(1) |
| Hiroki Mizumoto | 5(0) | - | - | - | - | - | - | - | - | O | - | - | - | - | 1(0) | 6(0) |
| Manabu Saito | 3(1) | O | - | - | O | - | - | - | - | - | - | - | - | - | 2(0) | 5(1) |
| Toshihiro Aoyama | 3(0) | O | - | O | O | - | - | O | - | - | - | - | - | - | 4(0) | 7(0) |
| Yohei Toyoda | 3(0) | O | - | - | - | - | - | - | - | - | - | - | O(1) | O | 3(1) | 6(1) |
| Junya Tanaka | 1(0) | - | - | - | - | - | - | - | O | O | - | O | - | - | 3(0) | 4(0) |
| Kosuke Ota | 1(0) | - | - | - | - | - | - | - | - | - | O | O | - | O | 3(0) | 4(0) |
| Daisuke Suzuki | 1(0) | - | - | - | - | - | - | - | - | - | - | O | - | - | 1(0) | 2(0) |
| Yoshinori Muto | 0(0) | - | - | - | - | - | - | - | O | O(1) | O | O | O | O | 6(1) | 6(1) |
| Gaku Shibasaki | 0(0) | - | - | - | - | - | - | - | - | O(1) | O | O | O | - | 4(1) | 4(1) |
| Taishi Taguchi | 0(0) | - | - | - | - | - | - | - | - | - | O | O | O | - | 3(0) | 3(0) |
| Ryota Morioka | 0(0) | - | - | - | - | - | - | - | O | - | - | O | - | - | 2(0) | 2(0) |
| Tsukasa Shiotani | 0(0) | - | - | - | - | - | - | - | - | - | O | O | - | - | 2(0) | 2(0) |
| Yu Kobayashi | 0(0) | - | - | - | - | - | - | - | - | - | O | O | - | - | 2(0) | 2(0) |
| Tatsuya Sakai | 0(0) | - | - | - | - | - | - | - | O | - | - | - | - | - | 1(0) | 1(0) |
| Yusuke Minagawa | 0(0) | - | - | - | - | - | - | - | O | - | - | - | - | - | 1(0) | 1(0) |

== National team (Women) ==
=== Results ===
| 2014.03.05 | Japan | 1–1 | United States | Portugal |
| | Miyama (?) | | ? (?) |

| 2014.03.07 | Japan | 1–0 | Denmark | Portugal |
| | Iwabuchi (?) |

| 2014.03.10 | Japan | 2–1 | Sweden | Portugal |
| | Ogimi (?); Miyama (?) | | ? (?) |

| 2014.03.12 | Japan | 0–3 | Germany | Portugal |
| | | | ? (?) ? (?) ? (?) |

| 2014.05.08 | Japan | 2–1 | New Zealand | Osaka, Japan |
| | Takase (?); Sugasawa (?) | | ? (?) | Stadium: Nagai Football Stadium |

| 2014.05.14 | Japan | 2–2 | Australia | Vietnam |
| | (?); Ogimi (?) | | ? (?) ? (?) |

| 2014.05.16 | Japan | 4–0 | Vietnam | Vietnam |
| | Kawasumi (?); Kiryu (?); Ogimi (?) |

| 2014.05.18 | Japan | 7–0 | Jordan | Vietnam |
| | Kira (?); Nakajima (?); Sakaguchi (?) (?) |

| 2014.05.22 | Japan | 2–1 | China | Vietnam |
| | Sawa (?); Iwashimizu (?) | | ? (?) |

| 2014.05.25 | Japan | 1–0 | Australia | Vietnam |
| | Iwashimizu (?) |

| 2014.09.13 | Japan | 5–0 | Ghana | Yamagata, Japan |
| | Takase (?); Sakaguchi (?); Osafune (?); Nakajima (?) | | | Stadium: Yamagata Park Stadium |

| 2014.09.15 | Japan | 0–0 | China | South Korea |

| 2014.09.18 | Japan | 12–0 | Jordan | South Korea |
| | Kawasumi (?); Sugasawa (?); Sakaguchi (?) (?); Kira (?); Miyama (?) |

| 2014.09.22 | Japan | 3–0 | Chinese Taipei | South Korea |
| | Sakaguchi (?); Kira (?); Kawasumi (?) |

| 2014.09.26 | Japan | 9–0 | Hong Kong | South Korea |
| | Masuya (?) (?); Nakajima (?); Iwashimizu (?); Kiryu (?); Takase (?); Sugasawa (?) |

| 2014.09.29 | Japan | 3–0 | Vietnam | South Korea |
| | Sakaguchi (?); Osafune (?); Sugasawa (?) |

| 2014.10.01 | Japan | 1–3 | North Korea | South Korea |
| | Miyama (?) | | ? (?) ? (?) ? (?) |

| 2014.10.25 | Japan | 3–0 | Canada | Canada |
| | Ogimi (?); Kawamura (?); Kawasumi (?) |

| 2014.10.28 | Japan | 3–2 | Canada | Canada |
| | Nagasato (?); Ogimi (?); Sameshima (?) | | ? (?) ? (?) |

=== Players statistics ===
| Player | -2013 | 03.05 | 03.07 | 03.10 | 03.12 | 05.08 | 05.14 | 05.16 | 05.18 | 05.22 | 05.25 | 09.13 | 09.15 | 09.18 | 09.22 | 09.26 | 09.29 | 10.01 | 10.25 | 10.28 | 2014 | Total |
| Homare Sawa | 189(81) | O | - | O | O | O | - | O | O | O(1) | O | - | - | - | - | - | - | - | - | - | 8(1) | 197(82) |
| Aya Miyama | 127(30) | O(1) | O | O(1) | O | O | O | O | - | O | O | O | O | O(1) | O | - | O | O(1) | O | O | 17(4) | 144(34) |
| Shinobu Ono | 119(39) | O | O | O | O | - | - | - | - | - | - | - | - | - | - | - | - | - | O | O | 6(0) | 125(39) |
| Kozue Ando | 115(18) | - | O | O | O | - | - | - | - | - | - | - | - | - | - | - | - | - | O | - | 4(0) | 119(18) |
| Yuki Ogimi | 103(47) | O | O | O(1) | O | - | O(1) | O(1) | O | - | - | - | - | - | - | - | - | - | O(1) | O(1) | 9(5) | 112(52) |
| Azusa Iwashimizu | 95(8) | O | O | O | O | O | O | O | - | O(1) | O(1) | - | - | O | O | O(1) | - | O | - | O | 14(3) | 109(11) |
| Yukari Kinga | 88(5) | O | - | O | O | - | - | - | - | - | - | - | - | - | - | - | - | - | O | - | 4(0) | 92(5) |
| Karina Maruyama | 77(14) | - | - | - | - | O | - | O | - | - | - | - | - | - | - | - | - | - | - | - | 2(0) | 79(14) |
| Miho Fukumoto | 70(0) | - | O | - | - | - | - | O | - | O | O | - | - | - | - | - | - | - | - | O | 5(0) | 75(0) |
| Mizuho Sakaguchi | 68(18) | O | - | O | O | O | O | - | O(2) | O | O | O(1) | O | O(3) | O(1) | O | O(1) | O | O | O | 17(8) | 85(26) |
| Rumi Utsugi | 62(5) | O | O | O | O | O | O | O | O | O | O | - | - | - | - | - | - | - | O | O | 12(0) | 74(5) |
| Saki Kumagai | 58(0) | O | - | O | O | - | - | - | - | - | - | - | - | - | - | - | - | - | O | O | 5(0) | 63(0) |
| Aya Sameshima | 55(2) | - | - | - | - | - | - | - | - | - | - | - | - | - | - | - | - | - | O | O(1) | 2(1) | 57(3) |
| Nahomi Kawasumi | 50(12) | O | O | O | O | O | O | O(2) | - | O | O | O | O | O(2) | O(1) | O | O | O | O(1) | - | 17(6) | 67(18) |
| Ayumi Kaihori | 40(0) | - | - | O | - | - | - | - | O | - | - | O | O | - | - | O | - | O | - | - | 6(0) | 46(0) |
| Megumi Takase | 35(5) | O | O | O | O | O(1) | O | O | O | O | O | O(2) | O | - | - | O(1) | O | O | O | O | 17(4) | 52(9) |
| Asuna Tanaka | 28(3) | - | O | - | - | - | - | - | - | - | - | - | - | - | - | - | - | - | - | O | 2(0) | 30(3) |
| Megumi Kamionobe | 23(2) | O | O | - | - | - | - | O | - | - | - | - | - | - | - | - | - | - | - | O | 4(0) | 27(2) |
| Mana Iwabuchi | 20(2) | O | O(1) | O | O | - | - | - | - | - | - | - | - | - | - | - | - | - | - | O | 5(1) | 25(3) |
| Saori Ariyoshi | 13(0) | O | O | O | O | O | O | O | - | O | O | O | O | O | O | - | O | O | O | O | 17(0) | 30(0) |
| Yuika Sugasawa | 12(2) | - | - | - | - | O(1) | - | O | - | O | O | O | O | O(3) | - | O(1) | O(1) | O | O | O | 12(6) | 24(8) |
| Emi Nakajima | 9(1) | - | O | - | - | O | O | - | O(2) | O | O | O(1) | O | O | O | O(1) | O | - | - | - | 12(4) | 21(5) |
| Kana Osafune | 8(0) | - | - | - | - | - | - | - | - | - | - | O(1) | O | O | - | O | O(1) | O | - | - | 6(2) | 14(2) |
| Nanase Kiryu | 6(0) | O | O | - | - | - | O | O(1) | - | O | - | O | O | O | O | O(2) | - | - | - | - | 10(3) | 16(3) |
| Asano Nagasato | 6(0) | - | - | - | - | - | - | - | - | - | - | - | - | - | - | - | - | - | - | O(1) | 1(1) | 7(1) |
| Erina Yamane | 4(0) | O | - | - | O | O | O | - | - | - | - | O | - | O | O | - | O | - | O | - | 9(0) | 13(0) |
| Yuri Kawamura | 4(0) | - | - | - | - | O | O | O | - | O | O | - | - | - | - | - | - | - | O(1) | O | 7(1) | 11(1) |
| Michi Goto | 3(2) | - | - | - | - | O | O | - | O | - | O | - | - | - | - | - | - | - | - | - | 4(0) | 7(2) |
| Kana Kitahara | 1(0) | - | O | - | - | - | - | - | - | - | - | O | O | O | O | - | O | - | - | - | 6(0) | 7(0) |
| Chinatsu Kira | 0(0) | - | - | - | - | O | O | - | O(2) | O | O | O | O | O(2) | O(1) | O | O | O | - | - | 12(5) | 12(5) |
| Rika Masuya | 0(0) | - | - | - | - | - | - | - | - | - | - | O | O | O | O | O(2) | O | O | - | - | 7(2) | 7(2) |
| Hikaru Naomoto | 0(0) | - | - | - | - | O | - | - | O | - | - | O | - | - | O | O | O | - | - | - | 6(0) | 6(0) |
| Rie Usui | 0(0) | - | - | - | - | - | - | - | - | - | - | O | O | O | O | O | - | O | - | - | 6(0) | 6(0) |
| Hisui Haza | 0(0) | - | - | - | - | - | - | - | - | - | - | O | - | - | O | O | O | - | - | - | 4(0) | 4(0) |
| Ruka Norimatsu | 0(0) | - | - | - | - | O | - | - | O | - | - | - | - | - | - | - | - | - | - | - | 2(0) | 2(0) |
| Yuria Obara | 0(0) | - | - | - | - | - | - | - | O | - | - | - | - | - | - | - | - | - | - | - | 1(0) | 1(0) |
| Shiho Kohata | 0(0) | - | - | - | - | - | - | - | O | - | - | - | - | - | - | - | - | - | - | - | 1(0) | 1(0) |
| Ami Sugita | 0(0) | - | - | - | - | - | - | - | O | - | - | - | - | - | - | - | - | - | - | - | 1(0) | 1(0) |
