= 2023 SheBelieves Cup squads =

List of players competing at the 8th edition of the SheBelieves Cup

This article lists the squads for the 2023 SheBelieves Cup, the 8th edition of the SheBelieves Cup. The cup consisted of a series of friendly games, and was held in the United States from 16 to 22 February 2023. The four national teams involved in the tournament registered a squad of 23 players.

The age listed for each player is on 16 February 2023, the first day of the tournament. The number of caps and goals listed for each player excludes any matches played after the tournament began. The club listed is the club for which the player last played a competitive match prior to the tournament. The nationality for each club reflects the national association (not the league) to which the club is affiliated. A flag is included for coaches that are of a different nationality than their own national team.

== Squads ==
=== Brazil ===
Coach: (Sweden) Pia Sundhage

The final 23-player squad was announced on 31 January 2023.

No.	Pos.	Player	Date of birth (age)	Club
1	GK	Lorena	6 May 1997 (aged 25)	(Brazilian Football Confederation) Grêmio
2	DF	Bruninha	16 June 2002 (aged 20)	(United States Soccer Federation) NJ/NY Gotham
3	DF	Kathellen	26 April 1996 (aged 26)	(Royal Spanish Football Federation) Real Madrid
4	DF	Rafaelle	18 June 1991 (aged 31)	(The Football Association) Arsenal
5	DF	Tainara	21 April 1999 (aged 23)	(German Football Association) Bayern Munich
6	DF	Tamires	10 October 1987 (aged 35)	(Brazilian Football Confederation) Corinthians
7	FW	Ludmila	1 December 1994 (aged 28)	(Royal Spanish Football Federation) Atlético Madrid
8	MF	Ana Vitória	6 March 2000 (aged 22)	(Portuguese Football Federation) Benfica
9	FW	Debinha	20 October 1991 (aged 31)	(United States Soccer Federation) Kansas City Current
10	FW	Marta	19 December 1986 (aged 36)	(United States Soccer Federation) Orlando Pride
11	MF	Adriana	17 November 1996 (aged 26)	(United States Soccer Federation) Orlando Pride
12	GK	Letícia Izidoro	13 August 1994 (aged 28)	(Brazilian Football Confederation) Corinthians
13	DF	Tarciane	27 May 2003 (aged 19)	(Brazilian Football Confederation) Corinthians
14	DF	Lauren	13 September 2002 (aged 20)	(Royal Spanish Football Federation) Madrid CFF
15	MF	Júlia Bianchi	7 October 1997 (aged 25)	(United States Soccer Federation) Chicago Red Stars
16	FW	Bia Zaneratto	17 December 1993 (aged 29)	(Brazilian Football Confederation) Palmeiras
17	MF	Ary	28 December 1999 (aged 23)	(United States Soccer Federation) Racing Louisville
18	FW	Geyse	27 March 1998 (aged 24)	(Royal Spanish Football Federation) Barcelona
19	DF	Yasmim	28 October 1996 (aged 26)	(Brazilian Football Confederation) Corinthians
20	FW	Nycole Raysla	26 March 2000 (aged 22)	(Portuguese Football Federation) Benfica
21	MF	Kerolin	17 November 1999 (aged 23)	(United States Soccer Federation) North Carolina Courage
22	GK	Luciana	24 July 1987 (aged 35)	(Brazilian Football Confederation) Ferroviária
23	FW	Gabi Nunes	10 March 1997 (aged 25)	(Royal Spanish Football Federation) Madrid CFF

=== Canada ===
Coach: (England) Bev Priestman

A preliminary squad was announced on 1 February 2023. The final 23-player squad was announced on 13 February 2023.

No.	Pos.	Player	Date of birth (age)	Caps	Goals	Club
1	GK	Kailen Sheridan	July 16, 1995 (aged 27)	31	0	(United States Soccer Federation) San Diego Wave
2	DF	Allysha Chapman	January 25, 1989 (aged 34)	93	2	(United States Soccer Federation) Houston Dash
3	DF	Kadeisha Buchanan	November 5, 1995 (aged 27)	128	4	(The Football Association) Chelsea
4	DF	Shelina Zadorsky	October 24, 1992 (aged 30)	87	4	(The Football Association) Tottenham Hotspur
5	MF	Quinn	August 11, 1995 (aged 27)	84	5	(United States Soccer Federation) OL Reign
6	DF	Gabrielle Carle	October 12, 1998 (aged 24)	35	1	(United States Soccer Federation) Washington Spirit
7	MF	Julia Grosso	August 29, 2000 (aged 22)	46	3	(Italian Football Federation) Juventus
8	MF	Simi Awujo	September 23, 2003 (aged 19)	3	0	(United States Soccer Federation) USC Trojans
9	FW	Jordyn Huitema	May 8, 2001 (aged 21)	60	15	(United States Soccer Federation) OL Reign
10	DF	Ashley Lawrence	June 11, 1995 (aged 27)	113	8	(French Football Federation) Paris Saint-Germain
11	FW	Clarissa Larisey	July 2, 1999 (aged 23)	4	1	(Swedish Football Association) Häcken
12	MF	Christine Sinclair	June 12, 1983 (aged 39)	319	190	(United States Soccer Federation) Portland Thorns
13	MF	Sophie Schmidt	June 28, 1988 (aged 34)	218	20	(United States Soccer Federation) Houston Dash
14	DF	Vanessa Gilles	March 11, 1996 (aged 26)	22	2	(French Football Federation) Lyon
15	FW	Evelyne Viens	February 6, 1997 (aged 26)	14	3	(Swedish Football Association) Kristianstad
16	FW	Janine Beckie	August 20, 1994 (aged 28)	98	36	(United States Soccer Federation) Portland Thorns
17	MF	Jessie Fleming	March 11, 1998 (aged 24)	111	19	(The Football Association) Chelsea
18	GK	Sabrina D'Angelo	May 11, 1993 (aged 29)	12	0	(The Football Association) Arsenal
19	FW	Adriana Leon	October 2, 1992 (aged 30)	92	28	(The Football Association) Manchester United
20	FW	Cloé Lacasse	July 7, 1993 (aged 29)	15	1	(Portuguese Football Federation) Benfica
21	DF	Jade Rose	February 12, 2003 (aged 20)	4	0	(United States Soccer Federation) Harvard Crimson
22	GK	Lysianne Proulx	April 17, 1999 (aged 23)	1	0	(Portuguese Football Federation) Torreense
23	FW	Jenna Hellstrom	April 2, 1995 (aged 27)	5	0	(French Football Federation) Dijon

=== Japan ===
Coach: Futoshi Ikeda

The final 23-player squad was announced on 8 February 2023. On 16 February 2023, Miyabi Moriya withdrew due to injury and was replaced by Shu Ohba.

No.	Pos.	Player	Date of birth (age)	Club
1	GK	Ayaka Yamashita	29 September 1995 (aged 27)	(Japan Football Association) INAC Kobe Leonessa
2	DF	Risa Shimizu	15 June 1996 (aged 26)	(The Football Association) West Ham United
3	DF	Moeka Minami	7 December 1998 (aged 24)	(Italian Football Federation) Roma
4	DF	Saki Kumagai	17 October 1990 (aged 32)	(German Football Association) Bayern Munich
5	DF	Shiori Miyake	13 October 1995 (aged 27)	(Japan Football Association) INAC Kobe Leonessa
6	DF	Rion Ishikawa	4 July 2003 (aged 19)	(Japan Football Association) Urawa Reds
7	MF	Hinata Miyazawa	28 November 1999 (aged 23)	(Japan Football Association) MyNavi Sendai
8	MF	Fuka Nagano	9 March 1999 (aged 23)	(The Football Association) Liverpool
9	FW	Riko Ueki	30 July 1999 (aged 23)	(Japan Football Association) Tokyo Verdy Beleza
10	FW	Mana Iwabuchi	18 March 1993 (aged 29)	(The Football Association) Tottenham Hotspur
11	FW	Rikako Kobayashi	30 July 1999 (aged 23)	(Japan Football Association) Tokyo Verdy Beleza
12	DF	Ruka Norimatsu	30 January 1996 (aged 27)	(Japan Football Association) Omiya Ardija Ventus
13	MF	Jun Endo	24 May 2000 (aged 22)	(United States Soccer Federation) Angel City
14	MF	Yui Hasegawa	29 January 1997 (aged 26)	(The Football Association) Manchester City
15	MF	Hina Sugita	31 January 1997 (aged 26)	(United States Soccer Federation) Portland Thorns
16	MF	Honoka Hayashi	19 May 1998 (aged 24)	(The Football Association) West Ham United
17	GK	Shu Ohba	11 July 2002 (aged 20)	(United States Soccer Federation) East Tennessee State Buccaneers
18	GK	Momoko Tanaka	17 March 2000 (aged 22)	(Japan Football Association) Tokyo Verdy Beleza
19	DF	Saori Takarada	27 December 1999 (aged 23)	(Swedish Football Association) Linköping
20	MF	Aoba Fujino	27 January 2004 (aged 19)	(Japan Football Association) Tokyo Verdy Beleza
21	GK	Chika Hirao	31 December 1996 (aged 26)	(Japan Football Association) Albirex Niigata
22	DF	Kiko Seike	8 August 1996 (aged 26)	(Japan Football Association) Urawa Reds
23	FW	Maika Hamano	9 May 2004 (aged 18)	(Swedish Football Association) Hammarby IF

=== United States ===
Coach: (North Macedonia) Vlatko Andonovski

The final 23-player squad was announced on 1 February 2023.

No.	Pos.	Player	Date of birth (age)	Caps	Goals	Club
1	GK	Alyssa Naeher	April 20, 1988 (aged 34)	87	0	(United States Soccer Federation) Chicago Red Stars
2	MF	Ashley Sanchez	March 16, 1999 (aged 23)	19	3	(United States Soccer Federation) Washington Spirit
3	DF	Alana Cook	April 11, 1997 (aged 25)	21	0	(United States Soccer Federation) OL Reign
4	DF	Becky Sauerbrunn	June 6, 1985 (aged 37)	212	0	(United States Soccer Federation) Portland Thorns
5	FW	Trinity Rodman	May 20, 2002 (aged 20)	12	2	(United States Soccer Federation) Washington Spirit
6	FW	Lynn Williams	May 21, 1993 (aged 29)	49	15	(United States Soccer Federation) NJ/NY Gotham
7	FW	Ashley Hatch	May 25, 1995 (aged 27)	15	5	(United States Soccer Federation) Washington Spirit
8	DF	Sofia Huerta	December 14, 1992 (aged 30)	27	0	(United States Soccer Federation) OL Reign
9	FW	Mallory Swanson	April 29, 1998 (aged 24)	84	28	(United States Soccer Federation) Chicago Red Stars
10	MF	Lindsey Horan	May 26, 1994 (aged 28)	123	26	(French Football Federation) Lyon
11	FW	Margaret Purce	September 18, 1995 (aged 27)	22	4	(United States Soccer Federation) NJ/NY Gotham
12	DF	Naomi Girma	June 14, 2000 (aged 22)	12	0	(United States Soccer Federation) San Diego Wave
13	FW	Alex Morgan	July 2, 1989 (aged 33)	201	120	(United States Soccer Federation) San Diego Wave
14	DF	Emily Sonnett	November 25, 1993 (aged 29)	70	1	(United States Soccer Federation) OL Reign
15	FW	Megan Rapinoe	July 5, 1985 (aged 37)	197	63	(United States Soccer Federation) OL Reign
16	MF	Rose Lavelle	May 14, 1995 (aged 27)	86	24	(United States Soccer Federation) OL Reign
17	MF	Andi Sullivan	December 20, 1995 (aged 27)	39	3	(United States Soccer Federation) Washington Spirit
18	GK	Casey Murphy	April 25, 1996 (aged 26)	12	0	(United States Soccer Federation) North Carolina Courage
19	DF	Crystal Dunn	July 3, 1992 (aged 30)	128	24	(United States Soccer Federation) Portland Thorns
20	MF	Taylor Kornieck	November 22, 1998 (aged 24)	9	2	(United States Soccer Federation) San Diego Wave
21	GK	Adrianna Franch	November 12, 1990 (aged 32)	10	0	(United States Soccer Federation) Kansas City Current
22	MF	Kristie Mewis	February 25, 1991 (aged 31)	47	7	(United States Soccer Federation) NJ/NY Gotham
23	DF	Emily Fox	July 5, 1998 (aged 24)	24	0	(United States Soccer Federation) North Carolina Courage

== Player representation ==
=== By club ===
Clubs with 3 or more players represented are listed.

Players	Club(s)
7	(United States) OL Reign
5	(United States) Portland Thorns, (United States) Washington Spirit
4	(Brazil) Corinthians, (Japan) Tokyo Verdy Beleza, (United States) NJ/NY Gotham, (United States) San Diego Wave
3	(Portugal) Benfica, (United States) Chicago Red Stars, (United States) North Carolina Courage

=== By club nationality ===
Players	Club(s)
42	United States
11	England, Japan
7	Brazil
5	Spain
4	France, Portugal, Sweden
2	Germany, Italy

=== By club federation ===
Players	Federation
42	CONCACAF
32	UEFA
11	AFC
7	CONMEBOL

=== By representatives of domestic league ===
Players	National squad
22	United States
11	Japan
7	Brazil
0	Canada
