= Hirao (surname) =

Hirao (written: 平尾) is a Japanese surname. Notable people with the surname include:

- Chika Hirao (平尾 知佳, born 1996), Japanese women's footballer
- Hiroshi Hirao (平尾 博嗣, born 1975), Japanese baseball player
- Seiji Hirao (平尾 誠二, 1963–2016), Japanese rugby union player and coach
- So Hirao (平尾 壮, born 1996), Japanese footballer
- Takayuki Hirao (平尾 隆之, born 1979), Japanese anime director
