= Chika Hirao =

Japanese footballer (born 1996)

Chika Hirao 平尾 知佳
Personal information
- Date of birth: 31 December 1996 (age 29)
- Place of birth: Matsudo, Chiba, Japan
- Height: 1.72 m (5 ft 8 in)
- Position: Goalkeeper

Team information
- Current team: Albirex Niigata
- Number: 1

Youth career
- 2009–2014: JFA Academy Fukushima

Senior career*
Years	Team	Apps	(Gls)
2014–2017	Urawa Reds	34	(0)
2018–2025	Albirex Niigata	123	(0)
2025–2026	Granada	9	(0)
2026–	Albirex Niigata	0	(0)

International career^{‡}
2012	Japan U-17	3	(0)
2016	Japan U-20	5	(0)
2018–	Japan	14	(0)
Medal record
Urawa Reds
Winner	Nadeshiko League	2014
Runner-up	Nadeshiko League Cup	2017
Runner-up	Empress's Cup	2014
Representing Japan
AFC Women's Asian Cup
Gold medal – first place	2018 Jordan
FIFA U-20 Women's World Cup
Bronze medal – third place	2016 Papua New Guinea
AFC U-19 Women's Championship
Gold medal – first place	2015 China
AFC U-16 Women's Championship
Gold medal – first place	2011 China
- * Club domestic league appearances and goals as of 02:52, 9 March 2026 (UTC) ‡ National team caps and goals as of 02:52, 9 March 2026 (UTC)

Chika Hirao (平尾 知佳, Hirao Chika; born 31 December 1996) is a Japanese professional footballer who plays as a goalkeeper for WE League club Albirex Niigata and the Japan national team.

== Club career ==
Hirao was born in Matsudo, Chiba on 31 December 1996. She joined L.League club Urawa Reds from JFA Academy Fukushima in 2014. She played many matches as a regular goalkeeper, helping the club become the champions in the first season. However her opportunity to play decreased behind Sakiko Ikeda from 2015 season. In 2018, she moved to Albirex Niigata.

== International career ==
In September 2012, when Hirao was 15 years old, she was selected Japan U-17 national team for 2012 U-17 Women's World Cup and she played 3 matches as regular goalkeeper. In November 2016, she was selected Japan U-20 national team for 2016 U-20 Women's World Cup. She played 5 matches and Japan won the 3rd place.

In April 2018, Hirao was selected Japan national team for 2018 Women's Asian Cup. Although she did not play in any matches, Japan won the championship after two tournaments in a row. On 2 August, she debuted against Australia.

On 10 May 2019, Hirao was included in the 23-player squad for the 2019 FIFA Women's World Cup.

On 18 June 2021, she was included in the Japan squad for the 2020 Summer Olympics.

On 13 June 2023, she was included in the 23-player squad for the FIFA Women's World Cup 2023.

On 14 June 2024, Hirao was included in the Japan squad for the 2024 Summer Olympics.

Hirao was part of the Japan squad that won the 2025 SheBelieves Cup.

== Career statistics ==
=== Club ===
As of match played 22 February 2026

Appearances and goals by club, season and competition
Club	Season	League			National cup (Note: Includes Empress's Cup, Copa de la Reina)		League cup (Note: Includes Nadeshiko League Cup, WE League Cup)		Total	
Club	Season	Division	Apps	Goals	Apps	Goals	Apps	Goals	Apps	Goals
Urawa Reds	2014	Nadeshiko League	22	0	0	0	0	0	22	0
Urawa Reds	2015	Nadeshiko League	7	0	0	0	0	0	7	0
Urawa Reds	2016	Nadeshiko League	5	0	1	0	7	0	13	0
Urawa Reds	2017	Nadeshiko League	0	0	0	0	8	0	8	0
Urawa Reds	Total		34	0	1	0	15	0	50	0
Albirex Niigata	2018	Nadeshiko League	18	0	2	0	4	0	24	0
Albirex Niigata	2019	Nadeshiko League	17	0	2	0	0	0	19	0
Albirex Niigata	2020	Nadeshiko League	12	0	0	0	—		12	0
Albirex Niigata	2021–22	WE League	14	0	2	0	—		16	0
Albirex Niigata	2022–23	WE League	19	0	3	0	3	0	25	0
Albirex Niigata	2023–24	WE League	21	0	2	0	5	0	28	0
Albirex Niigata	2024–25	WE League	22	0	4	0	5	0	31	0
Albirex Niigata	Total		123	0	15	0	17	0	155	0
Granada	2025–26	Liga F	8	0	1	0	—		9	0
Career total			131	0	16	0	17	0	164	0

=== International ===
As of match played 7 March 2026

Appearances and goals by national team and year
National team	Year	Apps	Goals
Japan	2018	1	0
Japan	2019	1	0
Japan	2020	0	0
Japan	2021	0	0
Japan	2022	2	0
Japan	2023	3	0
Japan	2024	2	0
Japan	2025	4	0
Japan	2026	1	0
Total		14	0
