= Shiho Kohata =

Japanese footballer

Shiho Kohata 高畑 志帆
Personal information
- Full name: Shiho Kohata
- Date of birth: November 12, 1989 (age 37)
- Place of birth: Hiroshima, Japan
- Height: 1.65 m (5 ft 5 in)
- Position: Defender

Team information
- Current team: AS Harima Albion
- Number: 37

Youth career
- 2005–2007: Fujieda Junshin High School
- 2008–2011: Waseda University

Senior career*
Years	Team	Apps	(Gls)
2012–2018	Urawa Reds	124	(9)
2019–	AS Harima Albion		
Total		124	(9)

International career
2014–2015	Japan	2	(0)
Medal record
Urawa Reds
Winner	Nadeshiko League	2014
Runner-up	Nadeshiko League Cup	2017
Runner-up	Empress's Cup	2014
Representing Japan
AFC Women's Asian Cup
Gold medal – first place	2014 Vietnam
- * Club domestic league appearances and goals as of December 31, 2018

Shiho Kohata (高畑 志帆, Kohata Shiho; born November 12, 1989) is a Japanese footballer who has played a defender for club sides as well the Japan national team.

== Club career ==
Kohata was born in Hiroshima Prefecture on November 12, 1989. After graduating from Waseda University, she joined Urawa Reds in 2012. She was selected Best Young Player awards in 2012 season. She was also selected Best Eleven in 2014 season. She played 124 matches for the club in L.League until 2018 season. She left the club end of 2018 season. In February 2019, she joined AS Harima Albion.

== National team career ==
In May 2014, Kohata was selected by the Japan national team for the 2014 Asian Cup. She debuted on May 18 against Jordan. Japan won the championship. She played two games for Japan until 2015.

== National team statistics ==
Japan national team
Year	Apps	Goals
2014	1	0
2015	1	0
Total	2	0
