= Ruka Norimatsu =

Japanese footballer

Ruka Norimatsu 乗松 瑠華
Personal information
- Full name: Ruka Norimatsu
- Date of birth: January 30, 1996 (age 30)
- Place of birth: Ageo, Saitama, Japan
- Height: 1.64 m (5 ft 4 1/2 in)
- Position: Defender

Team information
- Current team: Omiya Ardija Ventus
- Number: 5

Youth career
- 2008–2013: JFA Academy Fukushima

Senior career*
Years	Team	Apps	(Gls)
2014–2020	Urawa Reds	65	(1)
2021–	Omiya Ardija Ventus	0	(0)
Total		65	(1)

International career^{‡}
2012	Japan U-17	3	(0)
2016	Japan U-20	5	(0)
2014–	Japan	10	(0)
Medal record
Urawa Reds
Winner	Nadeshiko League	2014
Runner-up	Nadeshiko League Cup	2017
Runner-up	Empress's Cup	2014
Representing Japan
AFC Women's Asian Cup
Gold medal – first place	2014 Vietnam
FIFA U-20 Women's World Cup
Bronze medal – third place	2016 Papua New Guinea
AFC U-19 Women's Championship
Gold medal – first place	2015 China
AFC U-16 Women's Championship
Gold medal – first place	2011 China
- * Club domestic league appearances and goals as of December 31, 2018 ‡ National team caps and goals as of March 27, 2023

Ruka Norimatsu (乗松 瑠華, Norimatsu Ruka; born January 30, 1996) is a Japanese footballer who plays as a defender. She plays for Omiya Ardija Ventus. She has played for the Japan national team.

== Club career ==
Norimatsu was born in Ageo on January 30, 1996. After graduating from JFA Academy Fukushima, she joined Urawa Reds in 2014. She was selected Best Young Player awards and Best Eleven in 2014 season.

== National team career ==
In September 2012, Norimatsu was selected Japan U-17 national team for 2012 U-17 World Cup. On May 8, 2014, when Norimatsu was 18 years old, she debuted for Japan national team against New Zealand. She played for Japan at 2014 Asian Cup and Japan won the championship. In 2016, she played as captain for U-20 team at 2016 U-20 World Cup and Japan won 3rd place.

== National team statistics ==
Japan national team
Year	Apps	Goals
2014	2	0
2015	0	0
2016	0	0
2017	0	0
2018	0	0
2019	0	0
2020	0	0
2021	1	0
2022	6	0
2023	1	0
Total	10	0
