= Sakiko Ikeda =

Japanese footballer (born 1992)

Sakiko Ikeda 池田 咲紀子
Personal information
- Full name: Sakiko Ikeda
- Date of birth: September 8, 1992 (age 34)
- Place of birth: Saitama, Saitama, Japan
- Height: 1.68 m (5 ft 6 in)
- Position: Goalkeeper

Team information
- Current team: Urawa Reds
- Number: 1

Youth career
- 2008–2010: Urawa Reds

Senior career*
Years	Team	Apps	(Gls)
2011–	Urawa Reds	97	(0)
Total		97	(0)

International career
2008	Japan U-17	2	(0)
2012	Japan U-20	6	(0)
2017–2021	Japan	20	(0)
Medal record
Urawa Reds
Winner	Nadeshiko League	2014
Runner-up	Nadeshiko League Cup	2017
Runner-up	Empress's Cup	2014
Representing Japan
AFC Women's Asian Cup
Gold medal – first place	2018 Jordan
Asian Games
Gold medal – first place	2018 Jakarta-Palembang	Team
FIFA U-20 Women's World Cup
Bronze medal – third place	2012 Japan
AFC U-19 Women's Championship
Gold medal – first place	2011 Vietnam
- * Club domestic league appearances and goals as of December 31, 2018

Sakiko Ikeda (池田 咲紀子, Ikeda Sakiko; born September 8, 1992) is a Japanese football player who plays as a goalkeeper for Urawa Reds and the Japan national team.

== Club career ==
Ikeda was born in Saitama on September 8, 1992. In 2011, she was promoted to Urawa Reds from youth team.

== National team career ==
In 2008, Ikeda played for the Japan U-17 national team at the 2008 U-17 World Cup. In 2012, she also played for the Japan U-20 national team at the 2012 U-20 World Cup, and Japan won third place. In 2017, she was selected for the Japan national team, when they played in the 2017 Algarve Cup. At this competition, on March 6, she played against Norway.

On 19 March 2018, she was called up to the 2018 AFC Women's Asian Cup, where Japan won the championship.

On 10 May 2019, Ikeda was included in the 23-player squad for the 2019 FIFA Women's World Cup.

On 18 June 2021, she was included in the Japan squad for the 2020 Summer Olympics.

On 7 January 2022, Ikeda was called up to the 2022 AFC Women's Asian Cup squad.

== National team statistics ==
Japan national team
Year	Apps	Goals
2017	8	0
2018	6	0
2019	1	0
2020	1	0
2021	4	0
Total	20	0
