= 2012 Nadeshiko League =

Nadeshiko League
- Season: 2012
- Champions: INAC Kobe Leonessa; 2nd Nadeshiko League title
- Relegated: Fukuoka J. Anclas; AS Elfen Sayama FC
- Top goalscorer: Megumi Takase (20 goals)

The 2012 Nadeshiko League season was won by INAC Kobe Leonessa, who went undefeated the whole season and defended their 2011 title.

== Nadeshiko League (Division 1) ==
=== Result ===
Pos	Team	Pld	W	D	L	GF	GA	GD	Pts	Qualification or relegation
1	INAC Kobe Leonessa	18	17	1	0	69	12	+57	52	Champions
2	NTV Beleza	18	11	4	3	44	17	+27	37	
3	Okayama Yunogo Belle	18	10	2	6	36	22	+14	32	
4	Urawa Red Diamonds Ladies	18	8	4	6	31	22	+9	28	
5	Albirex Niigata Ladies	18	6	5	7	26	28	−2	23	
6	JEF United Ichihara Chiba Ladies	18	6	4	8	25	36	−11	22	
7	Iga F.C. Kunoichi	18	5	6	7	20	26	−6	21	
8	Speranza F.C. Osaka-Takatsuki	18	4	4	10	18	44	−26	16	
9	AS Elfen Sayama F.C.	18	3	2	13	19	50	−31	11	Division 1 promotion/relegation Series
10	Fukuoka J. Anclas	18	2	4	12	11	42	−31	10	Relegated to Division 2

=== League awards ===
==== Best player ====
Player	Club
(Japan) Megumi Takase	INAC Kobe Leonessa

==== Top scorers ====
Rank	Scorer	Club	Goals
1	(Japan) Megumi Takase	INAC Kobe Leonessa	20
2	(Japan) Asano Nagasato	NTV Beleza	19
3	(Japan) Shinobu Ono	INAC Kobe Leonessa	13
4	(Japan) Chinatsu Kira	Urawa Reds Ladies	10
5	(Japan) Nahomi Kawasumi	INAC Kobe Leonessa	8
5	(Japan) Marumi Yamazaki	Albirex Niigata Ladies	8

==== Best eleven ====
Pos	Player	Club
GK	(Japan) Miho Fukumoto	Okayama Yunogo Belle
DF	(Japan) Yukari Kinga	INAC Kobe Leonessa
DF	(Japan) Kyoko Yano	Urawa Reds Ladies
DF	(Japan) Azusa Iwashimizu	NTV Beleza
DF	(Japan) Asuna Tanaka	INAC Kobe Leonessa
MF	(Japan) Aya Miyama	Okayama Yunogo Belle
MF	(South Korea) Ji So-Yun	INAC Kobe Leonessa
MF	(Japan) Homare Sawa	INAC Kobe Leonessa
FW	(Japan) Megumi Takase	INAC Kobe Leonessa
FW	(Japan) Nahomi Kawasumi	INAC Kobe Leonessa
FW	(Japan) Asano Nagasato	NTV Beleza

==== Best young player ====
Player	Club
(Japan) Shiho Kohata	Urawa Reds Ladies

== Challenge League (Division 2) ==
=== Result ===
Pos	Team	Pld	W	D	L	GF	GA	GD	Pts	Promotion or relegation
1	Vegalta Sendai Ladies	22	20	2	0	88	12	+76	62	Promoted for Division 1
2	F.C. Takahashi Kibi International University Charme	22	16	2	4	75	26	+49	50	Division 1 promotion/relegation Series
3	Sfida Setagaya F.C.	22	14	1	7	59	37	+22	43	
4	Nippon Sport Science University	22	14	1	7	45	23	+22	43	
5	JFA Academy Fukushima	22	13	2	7	52	20	+32	41	
6	Tokiwagi Gakuen High School	22	12	2	8	59	37	+22	38	
7	Ehime F.C. Ladies	22	7	5	10	43	49	−6	26	
8	Shizuoka Sangyo University Iwata Bonita	22	7	5	10	29	51	−22	26	
9	Je Vrille Kagoshima	22	5	3	14	24	52	−28	18	
10	Bunnys Kyoto S.C.	22	3	3	16	18	78	−60	12	
11	AC Nagano Parceiro Ladies	12	2	4	6	14	63	−49	10	Division 2 promotion/relegation Series
12	Japan Soccer College Ladies	12	2	4	6	26	84	−58	10	Division 2 promotion/relegation Series

- Best Player: Minako Ito, Vegalta Sendai Ladies
- Top scorers: Ayaka Michigami, Tokiwagi Gakuen High School L.S.C.

== Promotion/relegation series ==
=== Division 1 promotion/relegation series ===
2012-11-17
14:00

F.C. Takahashi Kibi International University Charme	1 - 0	AS Elfen Sayama F.C.
	Report

Kasaoka, Okayama

2012-11-23
18:30

AS Elfen Sayama F.C.	2 - 3	F.C. Takahashi Kibi International University Charme
	Report

Kumagaya Athletic Stadium, Kumagaya, Saitama
- F.C. Takahashi Kibi International University Charme Promoted for Division 1 in 2013 Season.
- AS Elfen Sayama F.C. Relegated to Division 2 in 2014 Season.

=== Division 2 Promotion series ===
==== Promotion games ====
2012-11-02
11:00

Shimizudaihachi Pleiades	3 - 2	Mashiki Renaissance Kumamoto F.C.
	Report

Susono, Shizuoka

2012-11-02
11:00

Cerezo Osaka Ladies	2 - 1	Norddea Hokkaido
	Report

Susono, Shizuoka

2012-11-02
14:00

Hoyo Sukarabu F.C.	2 - 1 (a.e.t.)	NGU Nagoya F.C. Ladies
	Report

Susono, Shizuoka
- ShimizuDaihachi Pleiades, Cerezo Osaka Ladies, HOYO Sukarabu F.C.Promoted for Division 2 in 2013 Season.

==== Repechage games ====
2012-11-03
11:00

Mashiki Renaissance Kumamoto F.C.	0 - 1	Norddea Hokkaido
	Report

Susono, Shizuoka

2012-11-03
14:00

NGU Nagoya F.C. Ladies	1 - 5	Nojima Stella Kanagawa
	Report

Susono, Shizuoka

2012-11-04
11:00

Mashiki Renaissance Kumamoto F.C.	0 - 0 (a.e.t.)	NGU Nagoya F.C. Ladies
	Report
Penalties
	8 – 9

Susono, Shizuoka

2012-11-04
14:00

Norddea Hokkaido	0 - 4	Nojima Stella Kanagawa
	Report

Susono, Shizuoka
- Nojima Stella Kanagawa Promoted for Division 2 in 2013 Season.
- Norddea Hokkaido, NGU Nagoya F.C. Ladies play to Division 2 promotion/relegation Series.

=== Division 2 promotion/relegation series ===
2012-11-10
13:00

Norddea Hokkaido	0 - 3	Japan Soccer College Ladies
	Report

Muroran Irie Stadium, Muroran, Hokkaido
2012-11-18
13:00

Japan Soccer College Ladies	1 - 0	Norddea Hokkaido
	Report

Seirō, Niigata

2012-11-10
14:00

NGU Nagoya F.C. Ladies	1 - 2	AC Nagano Parceiro Ladies
	Report

Seto, Aichi
2012-11-17
13:00

AC Nagano Parceiro Ladies	5 - 0	NGU Nagoya F.C. Ladies
	Report

Nagano, Nagano
- AC Nagano Parceiro Ladies, Japan Soccer College Ladies stay Division 2 in 2013 Season

== See also ==
- Empress's Cup
