= Yuika Sugasawa =

Japanese footballer (born 1990)

Yuika Sugasawa 菅澤 優衣香
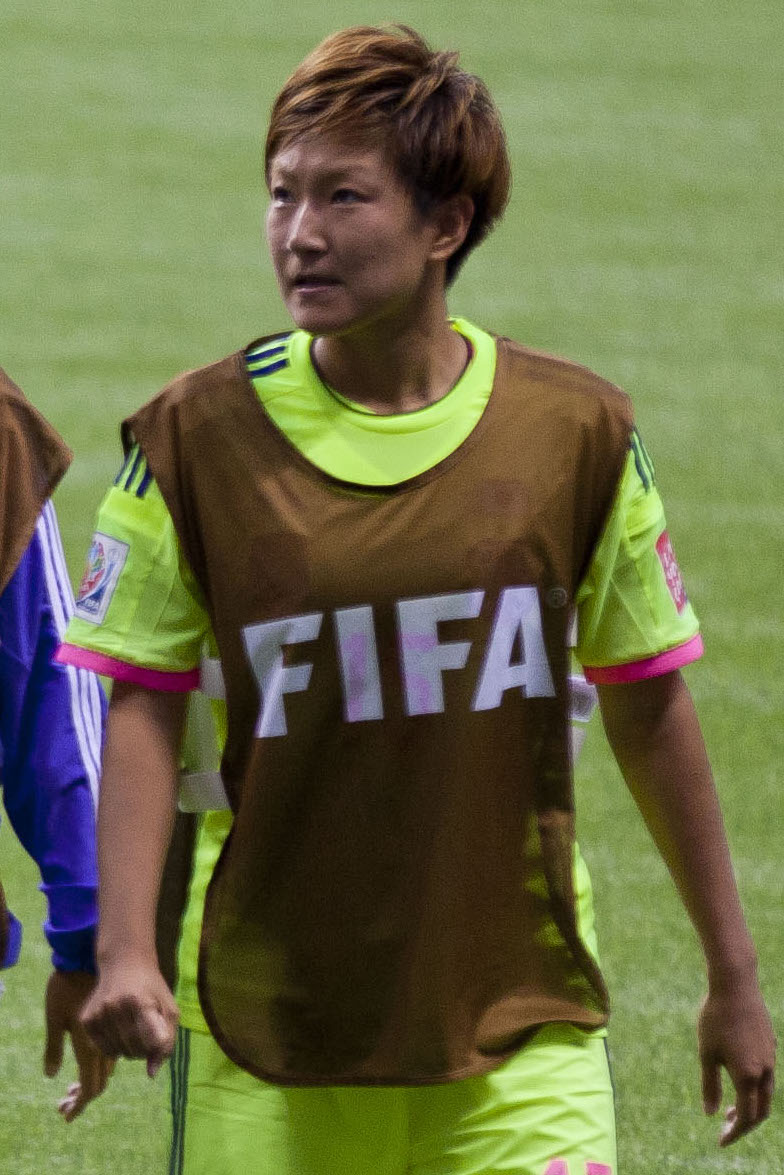
- Sugasawa in 2015

Personal information
- Full name: Yuika Sugasawa
- Date of birth: October 5, 1990 (age 36)
- Place of birth: Chiba, Chiba, Japan
- Height: 1.68 m (5 ft 6 in)
- Position: Forward

Team information
- Current team: Urawa Reds
- Number: 9

Youth career
- 2006–2008: JFA Academy Fukushima

Senior career*
Years	Team	Apps	(Gls)
2008–2012	Albirex Niigata	60	(19)
2013–2016	JEF United Chiba	79	(44)
2017–	Urawa Reds	109	(82)
Total		248	(145)

International career^{‡}
2010	Japan U-20	2	(0)
2010–	Japan	84	(29)
Medal record
Albirex Niigata
Runner-up	Empress's Cup	2011
JEF United Chiba
Runner-up	Nadeshiko League Cup	2016
Urawa Reds
Runner-up	Nadeshiko League Cup	2017
Representing Japan
FIFA Women's World Cup
Silver medal – second place	2015 Canada
AFC Women's Asian Cup
Gold medal – first place	2014 Vietnam
Gold medal – first place	2018 Jordan
Bronze medal – third place	2010 China
Asian Games
Gold medal – first place	2018 Jakarta-Palembang	Team
Silver medal – second place	2014 Incheon	Team
AFC U-19 Women's Championship
Gold medal – first place	2009 China
- * Club domestic league appearances and goals as of 9 September 2022 (UTC) ‡ National team caps and goals as of 9bSeptember 2022

Yuika Sugasawa (菅澤 優衣香, Sugasawa Yuika; born October 5, 1990) is a Japanese women's professional footballer who plays as a forward for Urawa Reds. She also plays for Japan national team.

== Club career ==
Sugasawa was born in Chiba on October 5, 1990. She joined Albirex Niigata from JFA Academy Fukushima in 2008. In 2013, she moved to her local club JEF United Chiba. She became top scorer in 2014 and 2015. In 2017, she moved to Urawa Reds. She was selected Best Eleven 3 times (2014, 2015 and 2017).

== National team career ==
On January 13, 2010, Sugasawa debuted for Japan national team against Denmark. In July, she was selected Japan U-20 national team for 2010 U-20 World Cup and she played 2 matches. She then scored the first goal for Japan senior team in a 2–0 victory over Denmark on March 2, 2012 which won the 2012 Algarve Cup. She was a member of Japan for 2015 World Cup and Japan won 2nd place. In Asia, she was also a member for 2014 and 2018 Asian Cup. Japan won the championship at both tournaments. She has played 84 games and scored 29 goals for Japan.

On 19 March 2018, she was called up to the 2018 AFC Women's Asian Cup, where Japan won the championship.

On 10 May 2019, Sugasawa was included in the 23-player squad for the 2019 FIFA Women's World Cup.

On 18 June 2021, she was included in the Japan squad for the 2020 Summer Olympics.

On 7 January 2022, Sugasawa was called up to the 2022 AFC Women's Asian Cup squad.

== Career statistics ==
=== Club ===
As of 2 June 2024

Appearances and goals by club, season and competition
Club	Season	League			National Cup		League Cup		Total	
Club	Season	Division	Apps	Goals	Apps	Goals	Apps	Goals	Apps	Goals
Albirex Niigata	2008	Nadeshiko League	11	2	-		-		11	2
Albirex Niigata	2009	Nadeshiko League	17	2	1	0	-		18	2
Albirex Niigata	2010	Nadeshiko League	18	10	3	4	1	1	22	15
Albirex Niigata	2011	Nadeshiko League	14	5	4	3	-		18	8
Albirex Niigata	2012	Nadeshiko League	0	0	1	0	0	0	1	0
Albirex Niigata	Total		60	19	9	7	1	1	70	27
JEF United Chiba	2013	Nadeshiko League	11	4	2	2	9	5	22	11
JEF United Chiba	2014	Nadeshiko League	28	20	3	1	-		31	21
JEF United Chiba	2015	Nadeshiko League	23	15	3	0	-		26	15
JEF United Chiba	2016	Nadeshiko League	17	5	3	1	10	3	30	9
JEF United Chiba	Total		79	44	11	4	14	8	104	56
Urawa Reds	2017	Nadeshiko League	18	9	4	2	7	3	29	14
Urawa Reds	2018	Nadeshiko League	18	11	4	5	4	1	26	17
Urawa Reds	2019	Nadeshiko League	17	15	3	0	4	4	24	19
Urawa Reds	2020	Nadeshiko League	16	17	-		4	1	20	18
Urawa Reds	2021-22	WE League	20	14	-		4	3	24	17
Urawa Reds	2022-23	WE League	20	12	6	3	0	0	26	15
Urawa Reds	Total		109	82	17	10	23	12	149	100
Career Total			248	145	37	21	38	21	323	183

=== International ===
As of match played 15 November 2022

Japan national team
Year	Apps	Goals
2010	6	0
2011	0	0
2012	4	2
2013	2	0
2014	12	6
2015	14	2
2016	1	0
2017	4	1
2018	17	6
2019	9	3
2020	2	0
2021	7	4
2022	6	5
Total	84	29

=== International goals ===
Scores and results list Japan's goal tally first.

No.	Date	Venue	Opponent	Score	Result	Competition
1.	2 March 2012	Estádio Municipal, Parchal, Portugal	Denmark	1-0	2-0	2012 Algarve Cup
2.	5 April 2012	Home's Stadium Kobe, Kobe, Japan	Brazil	4-1	4-1	Kirin Challenge Cup
3.	8 May 2014	Kincho Stadium, Osaka, Japan	New Zealand	2-1	2-1	Friendly
4.	18 September 2014	Namdong Asiad Rugby Field, Incheon, South Korea	Jordan	2-0	12-0	2014 Asian Games
5.	18 September 2014	Namdong Asiad Rugby Field, Incheon, South Korea	Jordan	6-0	12-0	2014 Asian Games
6.	18 September 2014	Namdong Asiad Rugby Field, Incheon, South Korea	Jordan	7-0	12-0	2014 Asian Games
7.	26 September 2014	Hwaseong Stadium, Hwaseong, South Korea	Hong Kong	8-0	9-0	2014 Asian Games
8.	29 September 2014	Incheon Football Stadium, Incheon, South Korea	Vietnam	3-0	3-0	2014 Asian Games
9.	6 March 2015	Stadium Bela Vista, Parchal, Portugal	Portugal	3-0	3-0	2015 Algarve Cup
10.	12 June 2015	BC Place, Vancouver, Canada	Cameroon	2-0	2-1	2015 Women's World Cup
11.	13 June 2017	Den Dreef, Oud-Heverlee Leuven, Belgium	Belgium	0-1	1-1	Friendly
12.	2 March 2018	Bela Vista Municipal Stadium, Parchal, Portugal	Iceland	1-0	2-1	2018 Algarve Cup
13.	1 April 2018	Transcosmos Stadium Nagasaki, Isahaya, Japan	Ghana	6-1	7-1	Friendly
14.	21 August 2018	Gelora Sriwijaya Stadium, Palembang, Indonesia	Vietnam	1-0	7-0	2018 Asian Games
15.	21 August 2018	Gelora Sriwijaya Stadium, Palembang, Indonesia	Vietnam	6-0	7-0	2018 Asian Games
16.	28 August 2018	Gelora Sriwijaya Stadium, Palembang, Indonesia	South Korea	0-1	1-2	2018 Asian Games
17.	31 August 2018	Gelora Sriwijaya Stadium, Palembang, Indonesia	China	1-0	1-0	2018 Asian Games
18.	2 June 2019	Stade Gérard Houllier, Le Touquet, France	Spain	1-1	1-1	Friendly
19.	14 June 2019	Roazhon Park, Rennes, France	Scotland	2-0	2-1	2019 Women's World Cup
20.	10 November 2019	Mikuni World Stadium, Kitakyushu, Japan	South Africa	2-0	2-0	2019 MS&AD Cup
21.	8 April 2021	Yurtec Stadium Sendai, Sendai, Japan	Paraguay	4–0	7–0	Friendly
22.	11 April 2021	Japan National Stadium, Tokyo, Japan	Panama	1–0	7–0	Friendly
23.	11 April 2021	Japan National Stadium, Tokyo, Japan	Panama	4–0	7–0	Friendly
24.	11 April 2021	Japan National Stadium, Tokyo, Japan	Panama	6–0	7–0	Friendly
25.	30 January 2022	DY Patil Stadium, Navi Mumbai, India	Thailand	1–0	7–0	2022 AFC Women's Asian Cup
26.	30 January 2022	DY Patil Stadium, Navi Mumbai, India	Thailand	4–0	7–0	2022 AFC Women's Asian Cup
27.	30 January 2022	DY Patil Stadium, Navi Mumbai, India	Thailand	6–0	7–0	2022 AFC Women's Asian Cup
28.	30 January 2022	DY Patil Stadium, Navi Mumbai, India	Thailand	7–0	7–0	2022 AFC Women's Asian Cup
29.	23 July 2022	Kashima Soccer Stadium, Kashima, Japan	Chinese Taipei	4–1	4-1	2022 EAFF E-1 Football Championship

== Honors ==
- FIFA Women's World Cup

Runner-Up: 2015

- AFC Women's Asian Cup

Champion: 2014, 2018

- Asian Games

Gold medal: 2018
Silver medal: 2014

- L.League

Top scorers: 2014, 2015
Best eleven: 2014, 2015
