= Kumi Yokoyama =

Japanese footballer

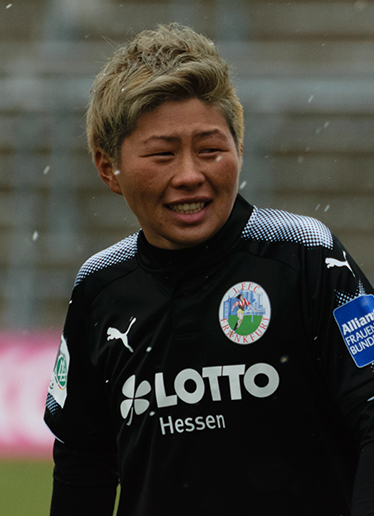
- Yokoyama with Frankfurt in 2017

Personal information
- Full name: Kumi Yokoyama
- Date of birth: 13 August 1993 (age 33)
- Place of birth: Tama, Tokyo, Japan
- Height: 1.55 m (5 ft 1 in)
- Position: Forward

Team information
- Current team: Okayama Yunogo Belle
- Number: 10

Youth career
- 2009–2011: Jumonji High School

Senior career*
Years	Team	Apps	(Gls)
2012–2013	Okayama Yunogo Belle	31	(3)
2014–2017	AC Nagano Parceiro	74	(87)
2017–2018	Frankfurt	22	(4)
2018–2019	AC Nagano Parceiro	9	(6)
2020–2021	Washington Spirit	12	(0)
2022	NJ/NY Gotham FC	8	(0)
2023–	Okayama Yunogo Belle	0	(0)

International career^{‡}
2010	Japan U-17	6	(6)
2012	Japan U-20	6	(1)
2015–2019	Japan	43	(17)
Medal record
Okayama Yunogo Belle
Runner-up	Nadeshiko League Cup	2013
Representing Japan
AFC Women's Asian Cup
Gold medal – first place	2018 Jordan
FIFA U-20 Women's World Cup
Bronze medal – third place	2012 Japan
AFC U-19 Women's Championship
Gold medal – first place	2011 Vietnam
FIFA U-17 Women's World Cup
Silver medal – second place	2010 Trinidad and Tobago
- * Club domestic league appearances and goals as of 17 October 2021 ‡ National team caps and goals as of 19 June 2019

Kumi Yokoyama (横山 久美, Yokoyama Kumi; born 13 August 1993) is a Japanese footballer who plays as a forward for Okayama Yunogo Belle and formerly played for the Japan women's national team.

== Club career ==
Yokoyama was born in Tama, Tokyo, on 13 August 1993. After graduating from high school, they joined Okayama Yunogo Belle in 2012. In 2014, they moved to L.League Division 2 club AC Nagano Parceiro. They became top scorer in 2014 and 2015. The club was also promoted to Division 1 from 2016. In 2016 season, they were selected Best Eleven. In July 2017, they moved to German Bundesliga club Frankfurt. In July 2018, Yokoyama returned to AC Nagano Parceiro. In December 2019, they signed with the Washington Spirit.

== National team career ==
In 2010, Yokoyama was selected for Japan U-17 national team for 2010 U-17 World Cup. They played 6 games and scored 6 goals, and Japan won 2nd place. They received one of the ten 2010 FIFA Puskás Awards nominations for his winning goal in the semifinals against North Korea, which made the headlines and was compared to Diego Maradona's second goal against England in the 1986 World Cup. In 2012 they were also a member of Japan women's U-20 national team for 2012 U-20 World Cup where Japan won 3rd place. In March 2015, they were selected for Japan women's national team for 2015 Algarve Cup. At this competition, on 6 March, they debuted and scored a goal against Portugal. In 2018, they played at 2018 Asian Cup. They scored 4 goals include 2 goals at semifinal and a goal at final, and Japan won the championship.

== Personal life ==
In June 2021, Yokoyama came out as a transgender man in a video interview conducted by former Nadeshiko striker Yuki Nagasato; Yokoyama decided to come out publicly after encouragement from their girlfriend. Kumi Yokoyama uses he/they pronouns.

== Career statistics ==
=== Club ===
As of 24 June 2017

Club	Season	League			Cup		League Cup		Total	
Club	Season	Division	Apps	Goals	Apps	Goals	Apps	Goals	Apps	Goals
Jumonji HS	2011	-	-		2	2	-		2	2
Jumonji HS	Total		0	0	2	2	0	0	2	2
Okayama Yunogo Belle	2012	1st	13	1	0	0	3	0	16	1
Okayama Yunogo Belle	2013	1st	18	2	3	0	10	2	31	4
Okayama Yunogo Belle	Total		31	3	3	0	13	2	47	5
AC Nagano Parceiro	2014	3rd	21	30	-		-		21	30
AC Nagano Parceiro	2015	2nd	25	35	-		2	2	27	37
AC Nagano Parceiro	2016	1st	18	16	6	9	3	2	27	27
AC Nagano Parceiro	2017	1st	10	6	2	4	0	0	12	10
AC Nagano Parceiro	Total		74	87	8	13	5	4	87	104
Career total			105	90	13	15	18	6	136	111

=== International ===
As of 19 June 2019

Appearances and goals by national team and year
National team	Year	Apps	Goals
Japan	2015	5	2
Japan	2016	8	3
Japan	2017	11	6
Japan	2018	11	5
Japan	2019	8	1
Total		43	17

Scores and results list Japan's goal tally first, score column indicates score after each Kumi Yokoyama goal.

List of international goals scored by Kumi Yokoyama
No.	Date	Venue	Opponent	Score	Result	Competition
1.	6 March 2015	Faro, Portugal	Portugal	2–0	3–0	2015 Algarve Cup
2.	8 August 2015	Wuhan, China	China	1–0	2–0	2015 EAFF East Asian Cup
3.	4 March 2016	Osaka, Japan	China	1–2	1–2	2016 AFC Women's Olympic Qualifying Tournament
4.	7 March 2016	Osaka, Japan	Vietnam	5–1	6–1	2016 AFC Women's Olympic Qualifying Tournament
5.	2 June 2016	Commerce City, United States	United States	3–3	3–3	Friendly
6.	1 March 2017	Parchal, Portugal	Spain	1–2	1–2	2017 Algarve Cup
7.	6 March 2017	Faro, Portugal	Norway	1–0	2–0	2017 Algarve Cup
8.	6 March 2017	Faro, Portugal	Norway	2–0	2–0	2017 Algarve Cup
9.	8 March 2017	Faro, Portugal	Netherlands	1–2	2–3	2017 Algarve Cup
10.	9 April 2017	Kumamoto, Japan	Costa Rica	1–0	3–0	Friendly
11.	10 June 2017	Breda, Netherlands	Netherlands	1–0	1–0	Friendly
12.	7 April 2018	Amman, Jordan	Vietnam	1–0	4–0	2018 AFC Women's Asian Cup
13.	17 April 2018	Amman, Jordan	China	2–0	3–1	2018 AFC Women's Asian Cup
14.	17 April 2018	Amman, Jordan	China	3–0	3–1	2018 AFC Women's Asian Cup
15.	20 April 2018	Amman, Jordan	Australia	1–0	1–0	2018 AFC Women's Asian Cup
16.	11 November 2018	Tottori, Japan	Norway	1–0	4–1	Friendly
17.	9 April 2019	Paderborn, Germany	Germany	2–1	2–2	Friendly

== Honors ==
Japan U20

- AFC U-19 Women's Championship

Champion (1) : 2011

Individual

- 2010 FIFA U-17 Women's World Cup : Silver Ball, Bronze Shoe
- 2014 L.League Division 2 : Top scorers

Japan

- AFC Women's Asian Cup: 2018
