= Hikaru Naomoto =

Japanese footballer (born 1994)

Hikaru Naomoto 猶本 光
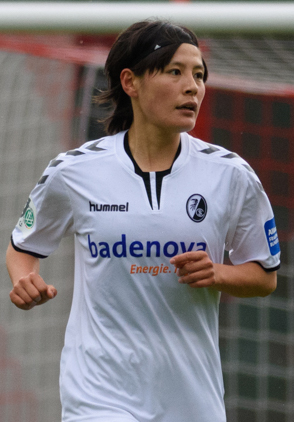
- Naomoto with SC Freiburg in 2019

Personal information
- Date of birth: March 3, 1994 (age 32)
- Place of birth: Ogori, Fukuoka, Japan
- Height: 1.58 m (5 ft 2 in)
- Position: Midfielder

Team information
- Current team: Tokyo Verdy Beleza
- Number: 8

Senior career*
Years	Team	Apps	(Gls)
2007–2011	Fukuoka J. Anclas	26	(0)
2012–2018	Urawa Reds	110	(9)
2018–2020	SC Freiburg	23	(0)
2020–2025	Urawa Reds	66	(20)
2025–	Tokyo Verdy Beleza		

International career^{‡}
2010	Japan U-17	6	(2)
2012	Japan U-20	6	(2)
2014–	Japan	40	(4)
Medal record
Urawa Reds
Winner	Nadeshiko League	2014
Runner-up	Nadeshiko League Cup	2017
Runner-up	Empress's Cup	2014
Representing Japan
AFC Women's Asian Cup
Gold medal – first place	2014 Vietnam
Gold medal – first place	2018 Jordan
Asian Games
Silver medal – second place	2014 Incheon	Team
FIFA U-20 Women's World Cup
Bronze medal – third place	2012 Japan
AFC U-19 Women's Championship
Gold medal – first place	2011 Vietnam
FIFA U-17 Women's World Cup
Silver medal – second place	2010 Trinidad and Tobago
AFC U-16 Women's Championship
Bronze medal – third place	2009 Thailand
- * Club domestic league appearances and goals as of 16：00, 30 June 2025 (UTC) ‡ National team caps and goals as of 14:19, 26 October 2023 (UTC)

Hikaru Naomoto (猶本 光, Naomoto Hikaru; born March 3, 1994) is a Japanese professional footballer who plays as a midfielder for WE League club Tokyo Verdy Beleza and the Japan women's national team.

== Club career ==
Naomoto was born in Ogori on March 3, 1994. In 2007, she joined her local club Fukuoka J. Anclas. After graduating from high school, she joined Urawa Reds in 2012. She was selected Best Eleven in 2014 season.On June 30, 2025, she announced her departure and transferred to Nippon TV Tokyo Verdy Beleza.

== National team career ==
Naomoto played for the Japan U-17 team at 2010 U-17 World Cup where Japan won 2nd place and for the U-20 team at 2012 U-20 World Cup, where Japan won 3rd place. On May 8, 2014, she debuted for the Japan national team against New Zealand. She was a member of Japan's 2014 Asian Cup and 2014 Asian Games squads. Japan won the championship at Asian Cup and 2nd place at Asian Games. In 2018, she played at 2018 Asian Cup and Japan won their second consecutive title. She played 18 games for Japan.

On 13 June 2023, she was included in the 23-player squad for the FIFA Women's World Cup 2023.

On July 26, she scored the opening goal in the 2023 FIFA Women's World Cup Group C Round 2 match against Costa Rica and contributed to the victory, and was named VISA Player of the Match.

== Career statistics ==
=== International ===
As of match played 26 October 2023

Appearances and goals by national team and year
National Team	Year	Apps	Goals
Japan	2014	6	0
Japan	2015	2	0
Japan	2016	0	0
Japan	2017	7	0
Japan	2018	3	0
Japan	2019	2	0
Japan	2020	0	0
Japan	2021	1	0
Japan	2022	10	2
Japan	2023	7	2
Total		38	4

Scores and results list Japan's goal tally first, score column indicates score after each Noamoto goal.

List of international goals scored by Hikaru Noamoto
No.	Date	Venue	Opponent	Score	Result	Competition
1	21 January 2022	Shree Shiv Chhatrapati Sports Complex, Pune, India	Myanmar	3–0	5–0	2022 AFC Women's Asian Cup
2	24 June 2022	Sport Center FAS, Stara Pazova, Serbia	Serbia	2–0	5–0	Friendly
3	26 July 2023	Forsyth Barr Stadium, Dunedin, New Zealand	Costa Rica	1–0	2–0	2023 FIFA Women's World Cup
4	26 October 2023	Lokomotiv Stadium, Tashkent, Uzbekistan	India	7–0	7–0	2024 AFC Women's Olympic Qualifying Tournament

== Honours ==
Japan

- AFC Women's Asian Cup: 2014, 2018

=== Individual ===
- Nadeshiko League Best XI: 2014
- WE League Valuable Player Award: 2021–22, 2022–23
- WE League Best XI: 2022–23
- 2023 FIFA Women's World Cup VISA Player of the Match: against Costa Rica
