= 2014 Nadeshiko League =

Nadeshiko League
- Season: 2014
- Champions: Urawa Red Diamonds Ladies; 3rd Nadeshiko League title
- Relegated: F.C. Kibi International University Charme
- Top goalscorer: Yuika Sugasawa (20 goals)

The 2014 Nadeshiko League season was won by Urawa Red Diamonds Ladies, and was their third title.

== Nadeshiko League (Division 1) ==
=== First stage : Regular series ===
Pos	Team	Pld	W	D	L	GF	GA	GD	Pts	2nd Stage : Ex.Pts
1	Okayama Yunogo Belle	18	11	3	4	37	25	+12	36	Championship League : 6
2	NTV Beleza	18	10	5	3	36	14	+22	35	Championship League : 5
3	Urawa Red Diamonds Ladies	18	10	5	3	30	11	+19	35	Championship League : 4
4	Albirex Niigata Ladies	18	10	2	6	30	18	+12	32	Championship League : 3
5	INAC Kobe Leonessa	18	9	2	7	33	18	+15	29	Championship League : 2
6	JEF United Ichihara Chiba Ladies	18	8	4	6	27	23	+4	28	Championship League : 1
7	Vegalta Sendai Ladies	18	7	4	7	23	17	+6	25	Position Playoff : 8
8	AS Elfen Saitama	18	5	2	11	30	47	−17	17	Position Playoff : 6
9	Iga F.C. Kunoichi	18	4	4	10	24	29	−5	16	Position Playoff : 5
10	F.C. Kibi International University Charme	18	0	1	17	11	79	−68	1	Position Playoff : 0

=== Second stage : Exciting series ===
==== Championship league ====
Pos	Team	Pld	W	D	L	GF	GA	GD	BP	Pts	Qualification
1	Urawa Red Diamonds Ladies	10	6	2	2	17	8	+9	4	24	Season Champions
2	NTV Beleza	10	6	1	3	13	10	+3	5	24	
3	Albirex Niigata Ladies	10	4	3	3	14	13	+1	3	18	
4	Okayama Yunogo Belle	10	3	2	5	12	20	−8	6	17	Regular Series Winner
5	JEF United Ichihara Chiba Ladies	10	3	1	6	18	19	−1	1	11	
6	INAC Kobe Leonessa	10	1	5	4	11	15	−4	2	10	

==== Position playoff ====
Pos	Team	Pld	W	D	L	GF	GA	GD	BP	Pts	Qualification or relegation
7	Vegalta Sendai Ladies	6	5	0	1	18	4	+14	8	23	
8	AS Elfen Saitama	6	4	0	2	10	9	+1	6	18	
9	Iga F.C. Kunoichi	6	3	0	3	7	7	0	5	14	Division 1 promotion/relegation Series
10	F.C. Kibi International University Charme	6	0	0	6	1	16	−15	0	0	Relegated for Division 2

=== League awards ===
==== Best player ====
Player	Club
(Japan) Michi Gotō	Urawa Red Diamonds Ladies

==== Top scorers ====
Rank	Scorer	Club	Goals
1	(Japan) Yuika Sugasawa	JEF United Ichihara Chiba Ladies	20
2	(Japan) Megumi Takase	INAC Kobe Leonessa	19
3	(Japan) Aya Miyama	Okayama Yunogo Belle	16
4	(Japan) Miki Matsuoka	Okayama Yunogo Belle	13
4	(Japan) Mizuho Sakaguchi	NTV Beleza	13

==== Best eleven ====
Pos	Player	Club
GK	(Japan) Miho Fukumoto	Okayama Yunogo Belle
DF	(Japan) Shiho Kohata	Urawa Reds Ladies
DF	(Japan) Ruka Norimatsu	Urawa Reds Ladies
DF	(Japan) Azusa Iwashimizu	NTV Beleza
MF	(Japan) Aya Miyama	Okayama Yunogo Belle
MF	(Japan) Hikaru Naomoto	Urawa Reds Ladies
MF	(Japan) Mizuho Sakaguchi	NTV Beleza
MF	(Japan) Saori Ariyoshi	NTV Beleza
MF	(Japan) Megumi Kamionobe	Albirex Niigata Ladies
FW	(Japan) Megumi Takase	INAC Kobe Leonessa
FW	(Japan) Yuika Sugasawa	JEF United Ichihara Chiba Ladies

==== Best young player ====
Player	Club
(Japan) Ruka Norimatsu	Urawa Red Diamonds Ladies

== Challenge League (Division 2) ==
=== Result ===
Pos	Team	Pld	W	D	L	GF	GA	GD	Pts	Promotion or relegation
1	Speranza F.C. Osaka-Takatsuki	22	16	5	1	53	16	+37	53	Promoted for Division 1
2	Nippon Sport Science University L.S.C.	22	16	3	3	60	19	+41	51	Division 1 promotion/relegation Series
3	Nojima Stella Kanagawa	22	16	2	4	54	26	+28	50	
4	AC Nagano Parceiro Ladies	22	13	3	6	70	37	+33	42	
5	AS Harima ALBION	22	12	5	5	26	16	+10	41	
6	Sfida Setagaya F.C.	22	11	5	6	45	30	+15	38	
7	JFA Academy Fukushima L.S.C.	22	11	3	8	42	31	+11	36	Moved to Division 3
8	Tokiwagi Gakuen High School L.S.C.	22	10	4	8	53	39	+14	34	Moved to Division 3
9	Ehime F.C. Ladies	22	8	3	11	41	39	+2	27	
10	Angeviolet Hiroshima	22	7	5	10	29	35	−6	26	
11	Japan Soccer College Ladies	22	6	5	11	25	42	−17	23	
12	Fukuoka J. Anclas	22	7	2	13	21	41	−20	23	
13	Shizuoka Sangyo University Iwata Bonita	22	5	6	11	27	47	−20	21	Relegated to Division 3
14	Cerezo Osaka Sakai Ladies	22	5	3	14	34	55	−21	18	Relegated to Division 3
15	Bunnys Kyoto S.C.	22	3	4	15	23	51	−28	13	Division 3 promotion/relegation Series
16	Shimizudaihachi Pleiades	22	1	0	21	9	88	−79	3	Division 3 promotion/relegation Series

- Best Player: Yui Narumiya, Speranza F.C. Osaka-Takatsuki
- Top scorers: Kumi Yokoyama, AC Nagano Parceiro Ladies
- Best young player: Arisa Minamino, Nojima Stella Kanagawa

== Promotion/relegation series ==
=== Division 1 promotion/relegation series ===
2014-11-15
13:00

Nippon Sport Science University L.S.C.	1 - 2	Iga F.C. Kunoichi

Hodogaya Park Soccer Field

2014-11-23
13:00

Iga F.C. Kunoichi	2 - 0	Nippon Sport Science University L.S.C.

Ueno Undo Koen Stadium
- Iga F.C. Kunoichi stay Division 1 in 2015 Season.
- Nippon Sport Science University L.S.C. stay Division 2 in 2015 Season.

=== Division 3 Promotion series ===
==== Block A ====
2014-11-01
10:00

Niigata University of Health and Welfare L.S.C.	1 - 0	Mashiki Renaissance Kumamoto F.C.

Tokinosumika Sports Center

2014-11-02
10:00

Yokohama F.C. Seagulls	2 - 0	Niigata University of Health and Welfare L.S.C.

Tokinosumika Sports Center

2014-11-03
10:00

Mashiki Renaissance Kumamoto F.C.	2 - 0	Yokohama F.C. Seagulls

Tokinosumika Sports Center
- Yokohama F.C. Seagulls, Niigata University of Health and Welfare L.S.C. Promoted for Division 3 in 2015 Season.
- Mashiki Renaissance Kumamoto F.C. play to Division 3 promotion/relegation Series Qualifiers.

==== Block B ====
2014-11-01
13:00

Yamato Sylphid	5 - 0	Diosa Izumo F.C.

Tokinosumika Sports Center

2014-11-02
13:00

NGU Nagoya F.C. Ladies	1 - 3	Yamato Sylphid

Tokinosumika Sports Center

2014-11-03
13:00

Diosa Izumo F.C.	0 - 12	NGU Nagoya F.C. Ladies

Tokinosumika Sports Center
- Yamato Sylphid, NGU Nagoya F.C. Ladies Promoted for Division 3 in 2015 Season.
- Diosa Izumo F.C. play to Division 3 promotion/relegation Series Qualifiers.

==== Block C ====
2014-11-01
10:00

Tsukuba F.C. Ladies	3 - 0	Je Vrille Kagoshima

Tokinosumika Sports Center

2014-11-02
10:00

Norddea Hokkaido	2 - 1	Tsukuba F.C. Ladies

Tokinosumika Sports Center

2014-11-03
10:00

Je Vrille Kagoshima	0 - 1	Norddea Hokkaido

Tokinosumika Sports Center
- Norddea Hokkaido, Tsukuba F.C. Ladies Promoted for Division 3 in 2015 Season.
- Je Vrille Kagoshima play to Division 3 promotion/relegation Series Qualifiers.

==== Final ====
2014-11-07
13:00

Mashiki Renaissance Kumamoto F.C.	13 - 0	Diosa Izumo F.C.

Tokinosumika Sports Center

2014-11-08
13:00

Je Vrille Kagoshima	0 - 2	Mashiki Renaissance Kumamoto F.C.

Tokinosumika Sports Center

2014-11-09
13:00

Diosa Izumo F.C.	0 - 3	Je Vrille Kagoshima

Tokinosumika Sports Center
- Mashiki Renaissance Kumamoto F.C., Je Vrille Kagoshima play to Division 3 promotion/relegation Series.
- Diosa Izumo F.C. Stay Regional League in 2015 Season.

=== Division 3 promotion/relegation series ===
2014-11-16
12:00

Je Vrille Kagoshima	0 - 2	Bunnys Kyoto S.C.

Shibushi Undo Koen, Shibushi, Kagoshima

2014-11-16
13:00

Mashiki Renaissance Kumamoto F.C.	4 - 0	Shimizudaihachi Pleiades

Yatsushiro Undo Koen, Yatsushiro, Kumamoto

2014-11-23
13:00

Shimizudaihachi Pleiades	0 - 1	Mashiki Renaissance Kumamoto F.C.

IAI Stadium Nihondaira, Shimizu, Shizuoka

2014-11-23
12:00

Bunnys Kyoto S.C.	2 - 0	Je Vrille Kagoshima

Nishikyogoku Sogo Undo Koen, Kyoto
- Bunnys Kyoto S.C. Stay Division 2 in 2015 Season.
- Mashiki Renaissance Kumamoto F.C. Promoted to Division 2 in 2015 Season.
- Shimizudaihachi Pleiades Relegated to Regional League (Tokai League) in 2015 Season.
- Je Vrille Kagoshima Stay Regional League (Kyushu, Q League) in 2015 Season.

== See also ==
- Empress's Cup
