= Hiroshi Hirao =

Japanese baseball player (born 1975)

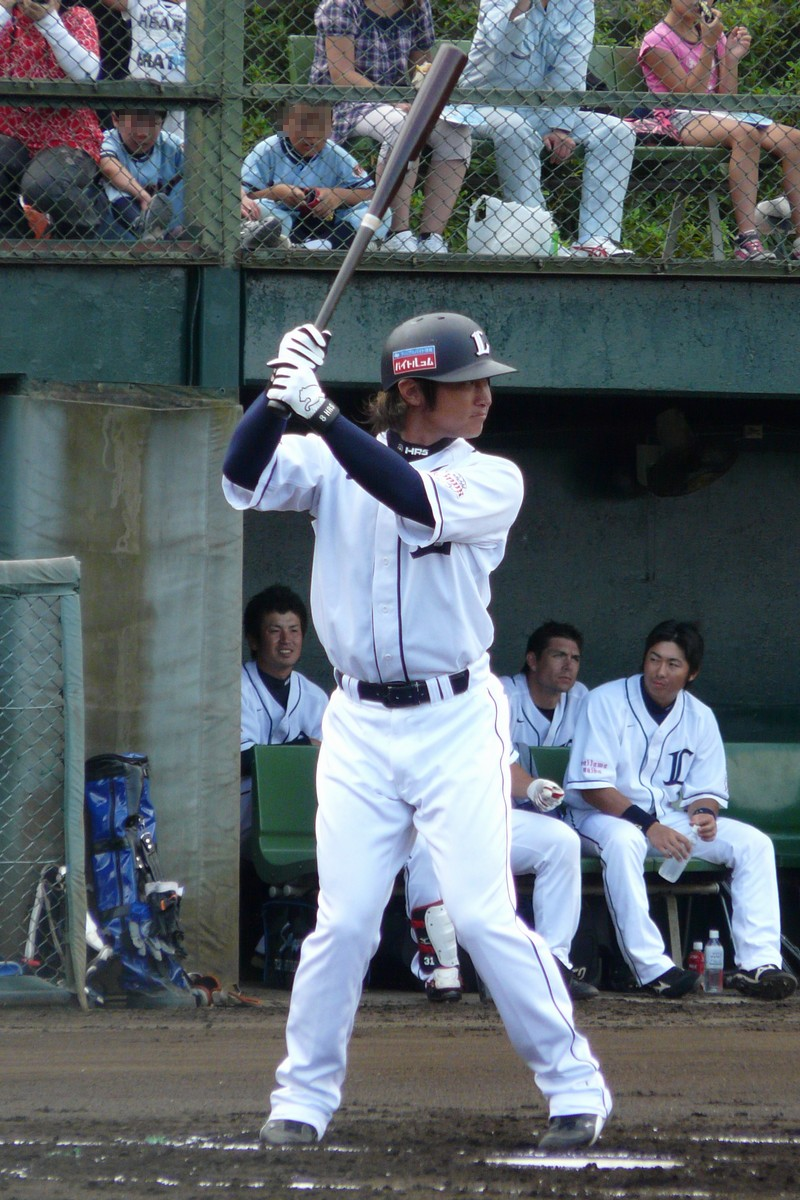
- Infielder / Coach
- Born: December 31, 1975 (age 50); Saitama, Japan
- Bats: Right Throws: Right

NPB debut
- April 11, 1995, for the Hanshin Tigers

NPB statistics (through 2008 season)
- Batting average: .245
- Hits: 315
- RBIs: 147
- Stats at Baseball Reference

Teams
- As player: Hanshin Tigers (1995–2000); Seibu Lions/Saitama Seibu Lions (2001–2012); As coach: Saitama Seibu Lions (2019–2020)
- Last updated on: December 28, 2018

Hiroshi Hirao (平尾 博嗣, Hirao Hiroshi; born December 31, 1975) is a Japanese Nippon Professional Baseball player. He is currently with the Saitama Seibu Lions in Japan's Pacific League. Before playing for the Lions, he was a member of the Hanshin Tigers.
