= Hana Takahashi =

Japanese footballer (born 2000)

Hana Takahashi 高橋 はな
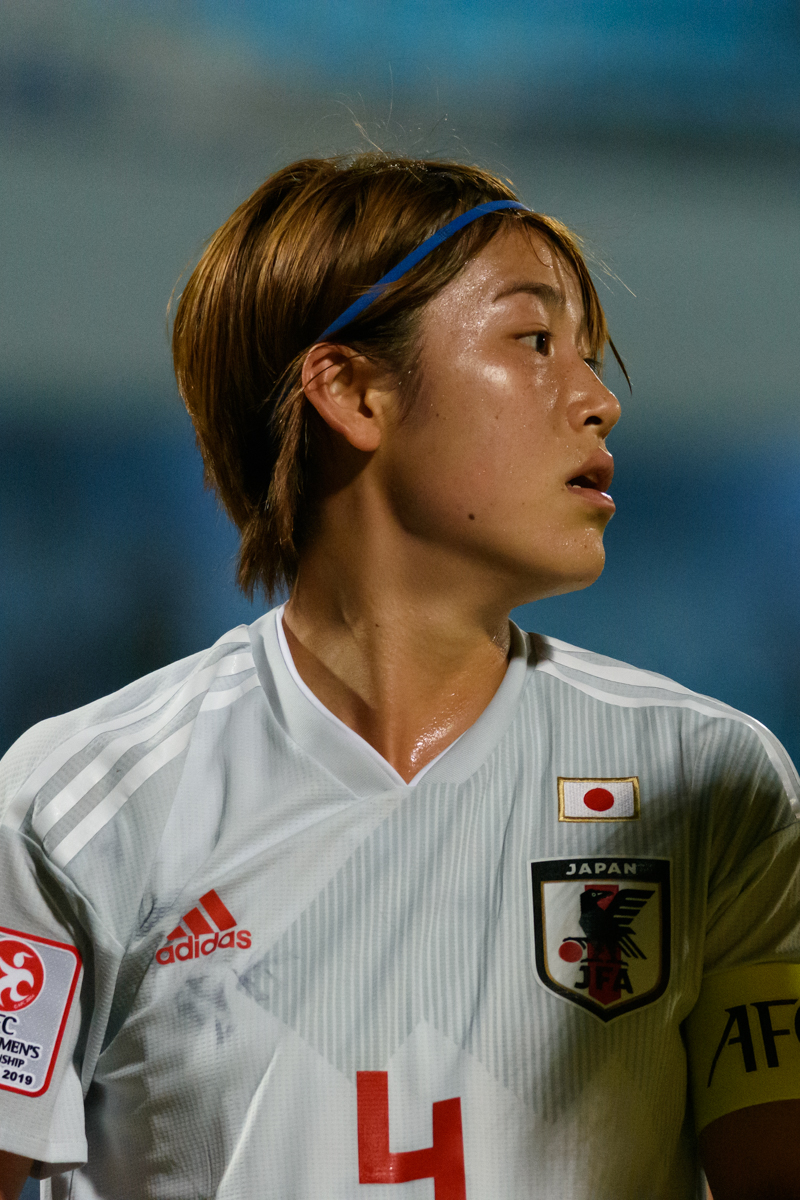
- Takahashi with Japan in 2019

Personal information
- Date of birth: 19 February 2000 (age 26)
- Place of birth: Kawaguchi, Saitama, Japan
- Height: 1.69 m (5 ft 7 in)
- Position: Defender

Team information
- Current team: Urawa Reds
- Number: 7

Youth career
- Urawa Reds

Senior career*
Years	Team	Apps	(Gls)
2018–	Urawa Reds	113	(22)

International career^{‡}
2013	Japan U14	4	(1)
2015	Japan U16	5	(3)
2016	Japan U17	4	(3)
2017–2019	Japan U19	10	(1)
2018	Japan U20	6	(0)
2019–	Japan	47	(5)
Medal record
Women's football
Representing Japan
AFC Women's Asian Cup
Winner	2026 Australia
- * Club domestic league appearances and goals as of 01:48, 13 April 2026 (UTC) ‡ National team caps and goals as of 01:48, 13 April 2026 (UTC)

Hana Takahashi (高橋 はな, Takahashi Hana; born 19 February 2000) is a Japanese professional footballer who plays as a defender for WE League club Urawa Reds Ladies and the Japan women's national team.

== International career ==
On 7 January 2022, Takahashi was called up to the 2022 AFC Women's Asian Cup squad.

On 13 June 2023, she was included in Japan's 23-player squad for the FIFA Women's World Cup 2023. She made her first World Cup appearance in the 2023 FIFA Women's World Cup Group C Round 3 match victory against Spain.

On 14 June 2024, Takahashi was included in the Japan squad for the 2024 Summer Olympics.

Takahashi was part of the Japan squad that won the 2025 SheBelieves Cup.

== Career statistics ==
=== International ===
As of match played 11 April 2026

Appearances and goals by national team and year
National Team	Year	Apps	Goals
Japan	2019	1	0
Japan	2020	0	0
Japan	2021	3	0
Japan	2022	9	1
Japan	2023	8	1
Japan	2024	9	1
Japan	2025	12	2
Japan	2026	5	0
Total		47	5

Scores and results list Japan's goal tally first, score column indicates score after each Takahashi goal.

List of international goals scored by Hana Takahashi
No.	Date	Venue	Opponent	Score	Result	Competition
1	27 June 2022	Veritas Stadion, Turku, Finland	Finland	3–1	5–1	Friendly
2	23 September 2023	Kitakyushu Stadium, Kitakyushu, Japan	Argentina	3–0	8–0	Friendly
3	28 February 2024	Japan National Stadium, Tokyo, Japan	North Korea	1–0	2–1	2024 AFC Women's Olympic Qualifying Tournament
4	6 April 2025	Yodoko Sakura Stadium, Osaka, Japan	Colombia	1–1	1–1	Friendly
5	9 July 2025	Suwon World Cup Stadium, Suwon, South Korea	Chinese Taipei	3–0	4–0	2025 EAFF E-1 Football Championship

== Honours ==
Mitsubishi Heavy Industries Urawa Reds Ladies

- WE League: 2022–23, 2023–24
- Nadeshiko League: 2020
- Empress's Cup: 2021
- WE League Cup: 2022–23

Japan U20

- FIFA U-20 Women's World Cup: 2018

Japan

- AFC Women's Asian Cup: 2026
- EAFF E-1 Football Championship: 2022

Individual

- WE League Best XI: 2021–22
- AFC Women’s Player of the Year: 2025
