= Je Vrille Kagoshima =

Je Vrille Kagoshima ジュ ブリーレ 鹿児島
- Full name: Je Vrille Kagoshima
- Nickname: Je Vrille
- Founded: 1992
- Ground: Kagoshima Kamoike Stadium
- Capacity: 19,952
- Manager: Izumi Deguchi
- League: Kyushu.League / Div.4
- 2016: 4th
- Website: http://jevrille.net/index.html
Home colours	Away colours

Je Vrille Kagoshima (ジュ ブリーレ 鹿児島) is a women's football club playing in Japan's football league, Challenge League. Its hometown is the city of Kagoshima, Kagoshima.

== Squad ==
=== Current squad ===
As of June 7, 2015 Note: Flags indicate national team as defined under FIFA eligibility rules; some limited exceptions apply. Players may hold more than one non-FIFA nationality.

No.	Pos.	Nation	Player
2	DF	JPN	Rio Shibako
3	DF	JPN	Misato Kumamoto
4	DF	JPN	Juri Wakida
5	DF	JPN	Kaori Yamada
6	MF	JPN	Kanna Sakamoto
7	DF	JPN	Wato Sasayama
8	DF	JPN	Konan Fukuishi

No.	Pos.	Nation	Player
9	FW	JPN	Megumi Tanaka
13	FW	JPN	Kanami Mitsudome
14	FW	JPN	Maiko Sasaki
15	MF	JPN	Karin Maeda
16	MF	JPN	Airi Iwakiri
18	GK	KOR	Mok Sun-Jung
19	MF	JPN	Aiyu Nitta

== Results ==
Season	Domestic League				National Cup	League Cup	League Note
Season	League	Level	Place	Tms.	National Cup	League Cup	League Note
2005	Kyushu	3	2nd	8	DNQ	-	
2006	Kyushu	3	1st	8	2nd Stage	-	
2007	Kyushu	3	1st	8	2nd Stage	-	Promoted for L.League
2008	Nadeshiko; Div.2	2	8th	9	DNQ	-	
2009	Nadeshiko; Div.2	2	7th	8	1st Stage	-	
2010	Challenge (West)	2	5th	6	2nd Stage	-	
2011	Challenge (West)	2	3rd	6	2nd Stage	-	
2012	Challenge	2	9th	12	DNQ	-	
2013	Challenge	2	15th	16	DNQ	-	Relegated to Regional League
2014	Kyushu	3	2nd	13	DNQ	-	
2015	Kyushu	4	12th	12	-	-	
2016	Kyushu Div.2	5	4th	8	DNQ	-	
2017	Kyushu Div.2	5		8	DNQ	-	

== Transition of team name ==
- FC Asahina : 1992 - 2002
- Kagoshima Kamoike FC Asahina : 2003 - 2008
- Je Vrille Kagoshima : 2009 – Present
