= 2017 Nadeshiko League Cup =

Statistics of Nadeshiko League Cup in the 2017 season.

== Overview ==
JEF United Chiba Ladies won the championship.

== Results ==
=== Division 1 ===
==== Qualifying round ====
===== Group A =====
Pos	Team	Pld	W	D	L	GF	GA	GD	Pts
1	Nippon TV Beleza	8	7	0	1	28	7	+21	21
2	JEF United Chiba Ladies	8	4	1	3	11	9	+2	13
3	AC Nagano Parceiro Ladies	8	3	1	4	16	18	−2	10
4	Nojima Stella Kanagawa Sagamihara	8	2	1	5	10	20	−10	7
5	Albirex Niigata Ladies	8	2	1	5	8	19	−11	7

===== Group B =====
Pos	Team	Pld	W	D	L	GF	GA	GD	Pts
1	INAC Kobe Leonessa	8	5	1	2	19	10	+9	16
2	Urawa Reds Ladies	8	4	4	0	10	6	+4	16
3	Mynavi Vegalta Sendai Ladies	8	2	3	3	9	10	−1	9
4	Chifure AS Elfen Saitama	8	2	1	5	6	15	−9	7
5	Iga FC Kunoichi	8	1	3	4	8	11	−3	6

==== Final round ====
===== Semifinals =====
- Nippon TV Beleza 2-2 (pen 4-5) Urawa Reds Ladies
- INAC Kobe Leonessa 0-1 JEF United Chiba Ladies

===== Final =====
- Urawa Reds Ladies 0-1 JEF United Chiba Ladies

=== Division 2 ===
==== Qualifying round ====
===== Group A =====
Pos	Team	Pld	W	D	L	GF	GA	GD	Pts
1	Nippon Sport Science University Fields Yokohama	8	6	0	2	26	11	+15	18
2	Sfida Setagaya FC	8	5	2	1	20	10	+10	17
3	Orca Kamogawa FC	8	2	3	3	4	7	−3	9
4	Nippatsu Yokohama FC Seagulls	8	2	1	5	5	10	−5	7
5	Konomiya Speranza Osaka-Takatsuki	8	1	2	5	3	20	−17	5

===== Group B =====
Pos	Team	Pld	W	D	L	GF	GA	GD	Pts
1	Cerezo Osaka Sakai Ladies	8	7	0	1	24	5	+19	21
2	Okayama Yunogo Belle	8	4	1	3	13	12	+1	13
3	AS Harima ALBION	8	4	0	4	12	11	+1	12
4	Ehime FC Ladies	8	3	0	5	14	13	+1	9
5	FC Kibi International University Charme	8	1	1	6	5	27	−22	4

==== Final ====
- Nippon Sport Science University Fields Yokohama 1-1 (pen 4-5) Cerezo Osaka Sakai Ladies
