= Urawa Red Diamonds Ladies =

Urawa Red Diamonds Ladies 浦和レッドダイヤモンズ・レディース
- Full name: Mitsubishi Heavy Industries Urawa Reds Ladies
- Founded: 1998; 28 years ago
- Ground: Urawa Komaba Stadium
- Capacity: 21,500
- Owner: Urawa Red Diamonds
- Chairman: Mitsuo Hashimoto (ja)
- Manager: Takafumi Hori
- League: WE League
- 2025–26: WE League, 2nd of 12
- Website: www.urawa-reds.co.jp/ladies
Home colours	Away colours

The Urawa Red Diamonds Ladies (浦和レッドダイヤモンズ・レディース, Urawa Reddo Daiyamonzu Redīsu), known for sponsorship reasons as Mitsubishi Heavy Industries Urawa Reds Ladies, is a professional women's football club playing in Japan's football league, WE League. Its hometown is the city of Saitama in Saitama Prefecture.

== Kits ==
=== Kit suppliers and shirt sponsors ===
Period	Kit manufacturer	Shirt sponsor (chest)	Shirt sponsor (sleeve)
2021–2022	Nike	Polus	Mitsubishi Motors
2022–2023	Nike	Polus	Mitsubishi Motors
2023–2024	Nike	Mitsubishi Heavy Industries	Mitsubishi Motors
2024-2025	Nike	Mitsubishi Heavy Industries	Mitsubishi Motors
2025-2026	Nike	Mitsubishi Heavy Industries	Mitsubishi Motors

== Other teams ==
- Men's: Urawa Red Diamonds play in J1 League.
- Youth: Urawa Red Diamonds Ladies Youth (Under-18) play in Kantō League.
- Junior Youth: Urawa Red Diamonds Ladies Junior Youth (Under-14) play in Saitama League.

== Players ==
=== Current squad ===
As of 3 July 2026.

Note: Flags indicate national team as defined under FIFA eligibility rules; some limited exceptions apply. Players may hold more than one non-FIFA nationality.

No.	Pos.	Nation	Player
1	GK	JPN	Sakiko Ikeda
2	DF	CMR	Easther Mayi Kith
3	DF	JPN	Raika Okamura
4	DF	JPN	Wakaba Goto
5	MF	JPN	Miki Ito
6	MF	JPN	Chika Kato
7	DF	JPN	Hana Takahashi
8	MF	JPN	Kotono Sakakibara
9	FW	JPN	Yuika Sugasawa
10	FW	JPN	Kozue Ando
13	DF	JPN	Reina Nagashima
14	MF	JPN	Makoto Harada
16	MF	JPN	Yuki Mizutani
17	DF	JPN	Ena Koizumi
18	MF	JPN	Hanae Shibata (captain)

No.	Pos.	Nation	Player
19	FW	USA	Sunshine Fontes
20	MF	JPN	Ena Takatsuka
21	MF	FRA	Laurie Teinturier
22	DF	JPN	Yoshion Akimoto
23	GK	JPN	Maya Ino
24	FW	JPN	Satoko Fujisaki
25	FW	JPN	Yoshino Maehara
26	MF	JPN	Ririka Tanno
28	MF	JPN	Madoka Sakurai
29	GK	JPN	Kaho Kubo
30	DF	JPN	Nonoka Nagao
31	GK	JPN	Kaho Kumazawa
33	DF	JPN	Ise Hana
34	MF	JPN	Hina Hirakawa
37	FW	JPN	Yuna Takahashi

=== Out on loan ===
Note: Flags indicate national team as defined under FIFA eligibility rules; some limited exceptions apply. Players may hold more than one non-FIFA nationality.

No.	Pos.	Nation	Player
—	GK	JPN	Shiori Fukuda (at RB Omiya Ardija until 30 June 2026)
—	FW	JPN	Nishio Hane (at RB Omiya Ardija until 30 June 2026)

=== Notable players ===
- GK
  - (Japan) Nozomi Yamago (2005–2012)
- DF
  - (Japan) Kyoko Yano (2007–2012)
  - (Japan) Saki Kumagai (2009–2011)
  - (Japan) Moeka Minami (2017–2022)
- MF
  - (Japan) Fuka Nagano (2014–2017)
  - (Japan) Kiko Seike (2014-2024)

== Club officials ==
As of 14 February 2026.

Role	Name
Manager	(Japan) Takafumi Hori
Assistant manager	(Japan) Kensuke Teraguchi (Japan) Takashi Kurokawa
Goalkeeper coach	(Japan) Eiichiro Yamada (Japan) Hiromi Naito
Physical coach	(Japan) Naoto Nakaichi
Trainer	(Japan) Yutaka Kawaguchi (Japan) Mizuki Nii (Japan) Rei Nagakubo

== Season-by-season records ==
Seasons of Urawa Red Diamonds Ladies
Season	Domestic League				National Cup	League Cup	Asia
Season	League	Level	Pos.	Tms.	National Cup	League Cup	Asia
1999	L.League	1	7th	8	Quarter-finals	Group stage	
2000	L.League	1	6th	9	Quarter-finals	—	
2001	L.League	1	5th	10	Quarter-finals	—	
2002	L.League	1	3rd	11	Semi-finals	—	
2003	L.League	1	4th	13	Semi-finals	—	
2004	L.League (L1)	1	Champions	8	Runners-up	—	
2005	L.League (L1)	1	5th	8	Semi-finals	—	
2006	Nadeshiko League Division 1	1	2nd	8	Semi-finals	—	
2007	Nadeshiko League Division 1	1	3rd	8	Semi-finals	Runners-up	
2008	Nadeshiko League Division 1	1	3rd	8	Quarter-finals	—	
2009	Nadeshiko League Division 1	1	Champions	8	Runners-up	—	
2010	Nadeshiko League	1	2nd	10	Runners-up	Runners-up	
2011	Nadeshiko League	1	3rd	9	Quarter-finals	—	
2012	Nadeshiko League	1	4th	10	Semi-finals	Group stage	
2013	Nadeshiko League	1	6th	10	Third stage	Group stage	
2014	Nadeshiko League	1	Champions	10	Runners-up	—	
2015	Nadeshiko League Division 1	1	6th	10	Quarter-finals	—	
2016	Nadeshiko League Division 1	1	8th	10	Quarter-finals	Semi-finals	
2017	Nadeshiko League Division 1	1	3rd	10	Semi-finals	Runners-up	
2018	Nadeshiko League Division 1	1	4th	10	Semi-finals	Group stage	
2019	Nadeshiko League Division 1	1	2nd	10	Runners-up	Semi-finals	
2020	Nadeshiko League Division 1	1	Champions	10	Runners-up	Not held	
2021–22	WE League	1	2nd	11	Winners	Not held	
2022–23	WE League	1	Champions	11	Quarter-finals	Winners	Winners
2023–24	WE League	1	Champions	12	Runners-up	Group stage	Winners
2024–25	WE League	1	3rd	12	Champions	Semi-finals	Quarter-finals
2025–26	WE League	1		12	Third stage	Group stage	

== Continental record ==
All results list Urawa Red Diamonds' goal tally first.

Season	Round	Club	Score
2023	Group A	(India) Gokulam Kerala	8–0
2023	Group A	(Thailand) Bangkok	6–1
2023	Group A	(Chinese Taipei) Hualien	6–0
2023	Final	(South Korea) Incheon Hyundai Steel Red Angels	2–1
2024–25	Group C	(India) Odisha	17–0
2024–25	Group C	(Chinese Taipei) Taichung Blue Whale	2–0
2024–25	Group C	(Vietnam) Hồ Chí Minh City	2–0
2024–25	Quarter-finals	(China) Wuhan Jiangda	0–0 (5–6 p)

== Honours ==
=== Domestic ===
- WE League
  - Winners (2) : 2022–23, 2023–24
  - Runners-up (1): 2021–22
- Nadeshiko League Division 1
  - Champions (4): 2004, 2009, 2014, 2020
  - Runners-up (3): 2006, 2010, 2019
- Empress's Cup
  - Champions (2): 2021, 2024
  - Runners-up (5): 2004, 2009, 2010, 2014, 2019, 2020
- WE League Cup
  - Champions (1): 2022–23
- Nadeshiko League Cup
  - Runners-up (3): 2007, 2010, 2017
- Nadeshiko Super Cup
  - Runners-up (1): 2005

=== International ===
- AFC Women's Club Championship
  - Champions (1): 2023
- Japan/Korea Women's League Championship
  - Champions (1): 2010

== Transition of team name ==
- Urawa Reinas FC: 1999–2001
- Saitama Reinas FC: 2002–2004
- Urawa Red Diamonds Ladies: 2005–present

== See also ==
- Japan Football Association (JFA)
- List of women's football clubs in Japan
