= AFC Annual Awards =

Asian football awards

- Current: 2025 AFC Annual Awards
- Location: Various
- Presented by: Asian Football Confederation
- First award: 1994; 32 years ago
- Website: www.the-afc.com/en/about_afc/afc_annual_awards.html

The AFC Annual Awards are awards given by the Asian Football Confederation (AFC) to the most outstanding performers of the Asian football season. The awards are presented at the end of each year at a special gala.

== Player awards ==
=== Player of the Year ===
For Player of the Year or Asian International Player of the Year (Men), see Asian Footballer of the Year.

=== Youth Player of the Year ===
For Youth Player of the Year, see Asian Young Footballer of the Year.

=== Women's Player of the Year ===
==== Continental winners ====
Year	Player	Club	Ref.
1999	(China) Sun Wen	(China) Shanghai SVA	
2000	Not awarded		
2001	Not awarded		
2002	Not awarded		
2003	(China) Bai Jie	(United States) Washington Freedom	
2004	(Japan) Homare Sawa	(Japan) NTV Beleza	
2005	(Japan) Natsuko Hara	(Japan) NTV Beleza	
2006	(China) Ma Xiaoxu	(China) Dalian Shide	
2007	(North Korea) Ri Kum-suk	(North Korea) April 25	
2008	(Japan) Homare Sawa	(Japan) NTV Beleza	
2009	Not awarded		
2010	(Australia) Kate Gill	(Australia) Perth Glory	
2011	(Japan) Aya Miyama	(Japan) Okayama Yunogo Belle	
2012	(Japan) Aya Miyama	(Japan) Okayama Yunogo Belle	
2013	Not awarded		
2014	(Australia) Katrina Gorry	(United States) Kansas City	
2015	(Japan) Aya Miyama	(Japan) Okayama Yunogo Belle	
2016	(Australia) Caitlin Foord	(Australia) Sydney FC	
2017	(Australia) Sam Kerr	(Australia) Perth Glory	
2018	(China) Wang Shuang	(France) Paris Saint-Germain	
2019	(Japan) Saki Kumagai	(France) Lyon	
2020	Not awarded		
2021	Not awarded		
2022	(Australia) Sam Kerr	(England) Chelsea	
2023	(Japan) Kiko Seike	(Japan) Urawa Red Diamonds	
2024	Not awarded		
2025	(Japan) Hana Takahashi	(Japan) Urawa Red Diamonds	
2026	(North Korea) Kim Kyong-yong	(North Korea) Naegohyang	

==== International winners ====
Year	Player	Club	Ref.
2023	(Australia) Ellie Carpenter	(France) Lyon	
2024	Not awarded		
2025	(Japan) Maika Hamano	(England) Chelsea	
2026	(Australia) Caitlin Foord	(England) Arsenal	

=== Foreign Player of the Year ===
Year	Player	Club	Ref.
2012	(Brazil) Rogerinho	Al Kuwait	
2013	(Brazil) Muriqui	(China) Guangzhou Evergrande	
2014	(Ghana) Asamoah Gyan	(United Arab Emirates) Al Ain	
2015	(Brazil) Ricardo Goulart	(China) Guangzhou Evergrande	

=== Asian All Stars ===
==== Former selections ====
The players from 1965 to 1982 were selected for the All-Star Games.

Year	Goalkeepers	Defenders	Midfielders	Forwards	Ref.
1965	(Thailand) Aswin Thong-innet	(South Korea) Kim Jung-suk (South Korea) Cha Tae-sung (India) Jarnail Singh (Taiwan) Kwok Kam-hung	(India) Yousuf Khan (South Vietnam) Nguyen Ngoc Thanh (Myanmar) Khin Maung Tun	(Taiwan) Wong Chi-keung (Taiwan) Cheung Chi Doy (South Vietnam) Nguyen Van Ngon (South Vietnam) Đỗ Thới Vinh (South Korea) Cho Yoon-ok (Japan) Yasuyuki Kuwahara (Singapore) Majid Ariff (Myanmar) Suk Bahadur	
1966	(South Vietnam) Pham Van Rang (Myanmar) Khim Maung Tun	(South Korea) Kim Jung-suk (South Korea) Cha Tae-sung (India) Jarnail Singh	(India) Yousuf Khan (South Vietnam) Nguyen Ngoc Thanh	(Taiwan) Wong Chi-keung (Taiwan) Cheung Chi Wai (Taiwan) Cheung Chi Doy (South Vietnam) Đỗ Thới Vinh (South Vietnam) Nguyen Van Ngon (Singapore) Majid Ariff (South Korea) Cho Yoon-ok (Myanmar) Suk Bahadur	
1967	(India) Peter Thangaraj (Myanmar) Tin Aung	(South Korea) Kim Jung-suk (India) Jarnail Singh	(Israel) Shmuel Rosenthal (Israel) Giora Spiegel (Myanmar) Maung Maung (Japan) Aritatsu Ogi (Iran) Parviz Ghelichkhani	(Taiwan) Leung Wai-hung (Taiwan) Cheung Chi Doy (Taiwan) Wong Chi-keung (Japan) Kunishige Kamamoto (Japan) Ryuichi Sugiyama (Iran) Homayoun Behzadi (Myanmar) Suk Bahadur (Indonesia) Soetjipto Soentoro (South Vietnam) Đỗ Thới Vinh (South Korea) Cho Yoon-ok (Singapore) Majid Ariff	
1968	(Malaysia) Chow Chee Keong (Myanmar) Tin Aung	(South Korea) Kim Jung-suk (Japan) Hiroshi Katayama (Malaysia) M. Chandran (Thailand) Narong Sangkasuwan (Pakistan) Turab Ali (Indonesia) Anwar Udjang	(Myanmar) Suk Bahadur (Israel) Shmuel Rosenthal (Japan) Aritatsu Ogi	(Japan) Kunishige Kamamoto (Japan) Ryuichi Sugiyama (South Vietnam) Đỗ Thới Vinh (South Vietnam) Nguyen Van Ngon (India) Inder Singh (Taiwan) Wong Chi-keung (Indonesia) Soetjipto Soentoro	
1982	(Malaysia) R. Arumugam	(Kuwait) Mahboub Juma'a (South Korea) Park Kyung-hoon (Thailand) Amnart Chalermchaowarit (Malaysia) Soh Chin Ann (Malaysia) Wong Hong Nung (Singapore) Terry Pathmanathan	(India) Prasun Banerjee (India) Parminder Singh (Malaysia) Khalid Ali (Malaysia) Reduan Abdullah (Malaysia) Jamaluddin Norbit	(Kuwait) Abdulaziz Al-Anberi (South Korea) Chung Hae-won (Thailand) Piyapong Pue-on (Malaysia) Zainal Abidin Hassan (Malaysia) Hassan Sani (Malaysia) Mokhtar Dahari	
1985	(Saudi Arabia) Abdullah Al-Deayea (Malaysia) R. Arumugam (India) Atanu Bhattacharya	(China) Lin Lefeng (China) Jia Xiuquan (Kuwait) Mahboub Juma'a (Iran) Mohammad Panjali (Syria) Radwan Al-Sheikh Hassan (South Korea) Park Sung-hwa	(Kuwait) Faisal Al-Dakhil (South Korea) Lee Tae-ho (Saudi Arabia) Saleh Khalifa Al-Dosari (Japan) Kazushi Kimura	(Saudi Arabia) Mohaisen Al-Jam'an (Saudi Arabia) Majed Abdullah (Syria) Marwan Madarati (Qatar) Mansour Muftah (Qatar) Mohammed Al-Mohanadi (Iraq) Hussein Saeed (Thailand) Piyapong Pue-on (Malaysia) Zainal Abidin Hassan (Iran) Nasser Mohammadkhani (China) Gu Guangming	
1993	(Japan) Shigetatsu Matsunaga	(Saudi Arabia) Mohammed Al-Khilaiwi (South Korea) Hong Myung-bo (Japan) Tetsuji Hashiratani (Iran) Javad Zarincheh	(Saudi Arabia) Fuad Anwar (Saudi Arabia) Khaled Massad (South Korea) Shin Hong-gi (Japan) Ruy Ramos	(Japan) Kazuyoshi Miura (Iran) Ali Daei	

==== Annual award ====
Year	Goalkeepers	Defenders	Midfielders	Forwards	Ref.
1997	(Saudi Arabia) Mohamed Al-Deayea	(China) Zhang Enhua (Japan) Naoki Soma (South Korea) Hong Myung-bo (Saudi Arabia) Mohammed Al-Jahani (Saudi Arabia) Abdullah Zubromawi	(Iran) Karim Bagheri (Japan) Hidetoshi Nakata (South Korea) Ha Seok-ju	(Iran) Khodadad Azizi (South Korea) Choi Yong-soo	
1998	(China) Jiang Jin	(China) Fan Zhiyi (Japan) Yutaka Akita (Saudi Arabia) Abdullah Zubromawi (Uzbekistan) Nikolay Shirshov	(Iran) Mehdi Mahdavikia (Japan) Hidetoshi Nakata (Japan) Hiroshi Nanami (South Korea) Yoo Sang-chul	(Iran) Ali Daei (Kuwait) Jasem Al Huwaidi	
1999	(Uzbekistan) Pavel Bugalo	(China) Zhang Enhua (Japan) Yuji Nakazawa (Saudi Arabia) Mohammed Al-Khilaiwi (Saudi Arabia) Hussein Sulaimani (Iraq) Radhi Shenaishil	(Japan) Hidetoshi Nakata (South Korea) Kim Do-kyun (United Arab Emirates) Sultan Rashid	(Iran) Ali Daei (Japan) Masashi Nakayama	
2000	(China) Jiang Jin (Indonesia) Hendro Kartiko (Saudi Arabia) Mohamed Al-Deayea	(China) Fan Zhiyi (Japan) Ryuzo Morioka (South Korea) Hong Myung-bo (Kuwait) Jamal Mubarak (Saudi Arabia) Mohammed Al-Khilaiwi (Qatar) Saoud Fath	(Iran) Karim Bagheri (Iraq) Abbas Obeid (Japan) Shunsuke Nakamura (Japan) Hiroshi Nanami (Saudi Arabia) Nawaf Al-Temyat (Thailand) Kiatisuk Senamuang	(Japan) Naohiro Takahara (South Korea) Lee Dong-gook	

=== Futsal Player of the Year ===
Year	Player	Club	Ref.
2006	Kenichiro Kogure	(Japan) Nagoya Oceans	
2007	Vahid Shamsaei	Tam Iran Khodro Tehran	
2008	Vahid Shamsaei	(Iran) Foolad Mahan	
2009	Not awarded		
2010	Mohammad Taheri	(Iran) Foolad Mahan	
2011	Mohammad Keshavarz	(Iran) Giti Pasand Isfahan	
2012	Rafael Henmi	(Japan) Nagoya Oceans	
2013	Suphawut Thueanklang	(Thailand) Chonburi Bluewave	
2014	Ali Asghar Hassanzadeh	(Russia) MFK Norilsk Nickel	
2015	Vahid Shamsaei	(Iran) Tasisat Daryaei	
2016	Ali Asghar Hassanzadeh	(Iran) Giti Pasand	
2017	Ali Asghar Hassanzadeh	(Iran) Giti Pasand	
2018	Ali Asghar Hassanzadeh	(China) Shenzhen Nanling Tielang	
2019	Tomoki Yoshikawa	(Japan) Nagoya Oceans	
2020	Not awarded		
2021	Not awarded		
2022	Moslem Oladghobad	(Spain) Palma	
2023	(Iran) Saeid Ahmadabbasi	(Spain) Valdepeñas	
2024	Not awarded		
2025	(Iran) Salar Aghapour	(Iran) Gohar Zamin	
2026	(Thailand) Muhammad Osamanmusa	(Spain) Cartagena	

== Coach awards ==
=== Coach of the Year ===
Year	Coach	Team	Ref.
1994	(Thailand) Charnwit Polcheewin	(Thailand) Thai Farmers Bank	
1995	(South Korea) Park Jong-hwan	(South Korea) Cheonan Ilhwa Chunma	
1996	(China) Ma Yuanan	China (women)	
1997	(South Korea) Cha Bum-kun	South Korea	
1998	(Japan) Takashi Kuwahara	(Japan) Júbilo Iwata	
1999	(Uzbekistan) Mahmoud Rakhimov	Uzbekistan	
2000	(France) Philippe Troussier	Japan	
2001	(Saudi Arabia) Nasser Al-Johar	Saudi Arabia	
2002	(Netherlands) Guus Hiddink	South Korea	
2003	(South Korea) Cha Kyung-bok	(South Korea) Seongnam Ilhwa Chunma	
2004	(Iraq) Adnan Hamad	Iraq	
2005			
2006	(North Korea) Choe Kwang-sok	North Korea U20 (women)	
2007	(Uzbekistan) Rauf Inileev	Uzbekistan	
2008	(Japan) Akira Nishino	(Japan) Gamba Osaka	
2009	(South Korea) Huh Jung-moo	South Korea	
2010	(Japan) Takeshi Okada	Japan	
2011	(Japan) Norio Sasaki	Japan (women)	
2012	(South Korea) Kim Ho-kon	(South Korea) Ulsan Hyundai	
2013	(South Korea) Choi Yong-soo	(South Korea) FC Seoul	
2014	(Australia) Tony Popovic	(Australia) Western Sydney Wanderers	
2015	(Australia) Ange Postecoglou	Australia	
2016	(South Korea) Choi Kang-hee	(South Korea) Jeonbuk Hyundai Motors	
2017	(Japan) Takafumi Hori	(Japan) Urawa Red Diamonds	
2018	(Japan) Go Oiwa	(Japan) Kashima Antlers	
2019	(South Korea) Chung Jung-yong	South Korea U20	
2020	Not awarded		
2021	Not awarded		
2022	(Japan) Hajime Moriyasu	Japan	
2023	(Japan) Go Oiwa	Japan U23	
2024	Not awarded		
2025	(North Korea) Ri Song-ho	North Korea U20 (women)	
2026	(Japan) Go Kuroda	(Japan) Machida Zelvia	

=== Women's Coach of the Year ===
Year	Coach	Team	Ref,
2007	(Scotland) Tom Sermanni	Australia	
2008	(North Korea) Kim Kwang-min	North Korea	
2009			
2010	(South Korea) Kim Tae-hee	South Korea U17	
2011	(Japan) Takako Tezuka		
2012	(Japan) Asako Takakura		
2013	(Japan) Asako Takakura	Japan U16	
2014	(Japan) Asako Takakura	Japan U17	
2015	(Japan) Asako Takakura	Japan U20	
2016	(Hong Kong) Chan Yuen-ting	(Hong Kong) Eastern Sports	
2017	(Japan) Asako Takakura	Japan	
2018	(Japan) Asako Takakura	Japan	
2019	(Japan) Asako Takakura	Japan	
2020	Not awarded		
2021	Not awarded		
2022	(China) Shui Qingxia	China	
2023	(South Korea) Park Youn-jeong	South Korea U20	
2024	Not awarded		
2025	(Iran) Marziyeh Jafari	(Iran) Bam Khatoon	
2026	(Iran) Marziyeh Jafari	(Iran) Bam Khatoon	

== Team awards ==
=== Club of the Year ===
Year	Club	Ref.
1996	(South Korea) Cheonan Ilhwa Chunma	
Not awarded from 1997 to 1999
2000	(Saudi Arabia) Al-Hilal	
2001	(South Korea) Suwon Samsung Bluewings	
2002	(Uzbekistan) Pakhtakor Tashkent	
2003	(United Arab Emirates) Al-Ain	
2004	(Saudi Arabia) Al-Ittihad	
2005	(Saudi Arabia) Al-Ittihad	
2006	(South Korea) Jeonbuk Hyundai Motors	
2007	(Japan) Urawa Red Diamonds	
2008	(Japan) Gamba Osaka	
2009	(South Korea) Pohang Steelers	
2010	(South Korea) Seongnam Ilhwa Chunma	
2011	(Qatar) Al-Sadd	
2012	(South Korea) Ulsan Hyundai	
2013	(China) Guangzhou Evergrande	
2014	(Australia) Western Sydney Wanderers	
2015	(China) Guangzhou Evergrande	

=== National Team of the Year ===
Year	Men's team	Ref.	Women's team	Ref.
1996	Saudi Arabia		China	
Not awarded from 1997 to 1999
2000	Japan		Not awarded	
2001	China		Not awarded	
2002	South Korea		Not awarded	
2003	Iraq		China	
2004	Japan		China U19	
2005	Japan		Japan U17	
2006	Australia		North Korea U20	
2007	Iraq		North Korea	
2008	Japan		North Korea	
2009	South Korea		Japan U20	
2010	Japan		Australia	
2011	Japan		Japan	
2012	South Korea U23		Japan	
2013	Iraq U20		South Korea U19	
2014	Palestine		Japan U17	
2015	Australia		Japan	

=== Futsal Team of the Year ===
Year	Team	Ref.
2002	Iran	
2003	Iran	
2004	Iran	
2005	Iran	
2006	Japan	
2007		
2008	Iran	
2009		
2010	Iran	
2011	(Japan) Nagoya Oceans	
2012	Japan	
2013	(Thailand) Chonburi Bluewave	
2014	Japan	
2015	(Iran) Tasisat Daryaei	

== Referee awards ==
=== Referee of the Year ===
Year	Referee	Ref.	Assistant referee	Ref.
1996	(Thailand) Pirom Un-prasert		(Oman) Al Musawi Mohamed Ahmed	
2002	(Japan) Toru Kamikawa		(Saudi Arabia) Ali Al Traifi	
2003	(Iran) Masoud Moradi		Not awarded	
2004	(China) Lu Jun		Not awarded	
2005	(Singapore) Shamsul Maidin		Not awarded	
2006	(Singapore) Shamsul Maidin		Not awarded	
2007	(Australia) Mark Shield		(Saudi Arabia) Mohamed Hamad Al Ghamdi	
2008	(Uzbekistan) Ravshan Irmatov		(Syria) Tammam Hamdoun	
2009	(Uzbekistan) Ravshan Irmatov		(Australia) Matthew Cream	
2010	(Uzbekistan) Ravshan Irmatov		(Japan) Toru Sagara	
2011	(Uzbekistan) Ravshan Irmatov		(Uzbekistan) Abdukhamidullo Rasulov	
2012	(Japan) Yuichi Nishimura		(Uzbekistan) Abdukhamidullo Rasulov	
2013	(Australia) Ben Williams		(Japan) Toshiyuki Nagi	
2014	(Uzbekistan) Ravshan Irmatov		(Australia) Matthew Cream	
2015	(Saudi Arabia) Fahad Al-Mirdasi		(Saudi Arabia) Abdulah Al-Shalwai (Oman) Abu Bakar Al-Amri	
2016	(Iran) Alireza Faghani		(Iran) Reza Sokhandan (Iran) Mohammad Reza Mansouri	
2017	(Uzbekistan) Bakhtiyor Namazov		Not awarded	
2018	(Iran) Alireza Faghani		(Iran) Reza Sokhandan	
2019				
2020	Not awarded		Not awarded	
2021	Not awarded		Not awarded	

Year	Referee	Ref.	Assistant referee	Ref.	Video assistant referee	Ref.
2022	(Australia) Chris Beath		(Australia) Ashley Beecham (Australia) Anton Schetinin		(United Arab Emirates) Ammar Al-Jneibi	

Year	Referees	Ref.
2023	(Japan) Yuichi Hatano (Oman) Abdullah Al-Salehi (United Arab Emirates) Ibrahim Yousif Al Raeesi	
2024	Not awarded	
2025	(Iran) Alireza Faghani (Australia) Anton Shchetinin (Australia) Ashley Beecham	

=== Women's Referee of the Year ===
Year	Referee	Ref.	Assistant referee	Ref.
2007	(Australia) Tammy Ogston		(Chinese Taipei) Liu Hsiu-mei	
2008	(Japan) Sachiko Baba		(Japan) Hisae Yoshizawa	
2009	(South Korea) Hong Eun-ah		(China) Zhang Lingling	
2010	(Japan) Sachiko Yamagishi		(Japan) Shiho Ayukai	
2011	(Japan) Sachiko Yamagishi		(Australia) Sarah Ho	
2012	(Japan) Sachiko Yamagishi		(South Korea) Kim Kyoung-min	
2013	(Japan) Sachiko Yamagishi		(Australia) Allyson Flynn	
2014	(Malaysia) Rita Gani		(South Korea) Kim Kyoung-min	
2015				
2016	(Australia) Kate Jacewicz		(Australia) Renae Coghill (India) Uvena Fernandes	

== Association awards ==
=== Fair Play Award ===
Year	Nation	Ref.
1996	Iran	
2002	South Korea	
2003	South Korea	
2004	China	
2005	Hong Kong	
2006	South Korea	
2007	Japan; South Korea	
2008	Japan; Chinese Taipei	
2009	Japan	
2010	Japan	
2011	South Korea	
2012	Uzbekistan	
2013	China	
2014	South Korea	
2015	Japan	

=== Member Association of the Year ===
Year	Nation	Ref.
2005	Qatar	
2006	North Korea	
2007	China; Japan	
2008	Iran; Australia	
2009	North Korea; Japan	
2010	Japan	
2011	Japan	
2012	Iran	

Year	Inspiring MA	Ref.	Developing MA	Ref.	Aspiring MA	Ref.
2013	China		Jordan		Pakistan	
2014	Japan		North Korea		Kyrgyzstan	
2015	Japan		Hong Kong		Bangladesh	
2016	Japan		India		Bhutan	
2017	Iran		Vietnam		Afghanistan	
2018	Japan		North Korea		Mongolia	
2019	Japan		Hong Kong		Guam	

Year	Platinum	Diamond	Gold	Ruby	Ref.
2022	Uzbekistan	Lebanon	Hong Kong	Guam	
2023	Japan	Thailand	Nepal	Laos	
2024	Not awarded				
2025	Saudi Arabia	Thailand	Hong Kong	Laos	
2026	Japan	Thailand	India	Bangladesh	

=== President Recognition Award ===
==== For Grassroots Football ====
Year	Nations			Ref.
2013	Japan			
2014	India	Philippines	Tajikistan	
2015	Vietnam	Japan	Brunei	
2016	Australia	Philippines	Brunei	

Year	Inspiring MA	Developing MA	Aspiring MA	Ref.
2017	China	Singapore	Bhutan	
2018	China	Singapore	Palestine	
2019	China	Singapore	Brunei	

Year	Gold	Silver	Bronze	Ref.
2022	Australia	Guam	India	
2023	Australia	India	Vietnam	
2024	Not awarded			
2025	United Arab Emirates	Malaysia	Bangladesh	
2026	Japan	Bangladesh	Myanmar	

==== For Outstanding Achievement ====
Year	Nation	Ref.
2025	North Korea	

=== Dream Asia Award ===
Year	Nation	Ref.
2010	Australia	
2011	Qatar	
2012	United Arab Emirates	
2013	Myanmar	
2014	Qatar	
2015	Japan	
2016	Qatar	
2017	Japan	
2018	China (Inspiring)	
2018	Malaysia (Developing)	
2018	Mongolia (Aspring)	

=== Regional Association of the Year ===
Year	Association	Ref.
2022	Central Asian Football Association	
2023	Central Asian Football Association	
2024	Not awarded	
2025	ASEAN Football Federation	
2026	ASEAN Football Federation	

== Other awards ==
=== Diamond of Asia ===
Year	Name	Ref.
2004	(Saudi Arabia) Abdul Rahman bin Saud Al Saud	
2005	(Japan) Saburō Kawabuchi	
2006	(Switzerland) Sepp Blatter	
2007	(Sweden) Lennart Johansson	
2008	(Japan) Ken Naganuma	
2009	(Syria) Farouk Bouzo	
2010	(Malaysia) Najib Razak	
2011	(Malaysia) Ahmad Shah of Pahang	
2012	(Malaysia) Hamzah Abu Samah	
2013	(South Korea) Chung Mong-joon	
2014	(Japan) Junji Ogura	
2015	(Saudi Arabia) Abdullah Khalid Al Dabal	
2016	(Cameroon) Issa Hayatou	
2017	(United Arab Emirates) Yousuf al-Serkal	
2018	(China) Zhang Jilong	
2019	(Malaysia) Abdullah of Pahang	
2020	Not awarded	
2021	Not awarded	
2022	(Qatar) Saoud Al-Mohannadi	
2023	(Switzerland) Gianni Infantino	
2024	Not awarded	
2025	(Hong Kong) Timothy Fok	
2026	(Singapore) Lim Kia Tong	

=== Match Commissioner of the Year ===
Year	Name	Ref.
2008	(Malaysia) Kamarudin Sakhari (Philippines) Mary Catherine Rivilla	
2009	(Lebanon) Mazen Ramadan (Laos) Kanya Keomany	
2010	(Maldives) Abdul Ghafoor Abdul Hameed (Hong Kong) Emily Lau Cheuk-chi	

=== Special Recognition Award ===
Year	Name	Ref.
2018	(Thailand) Wild Boars FC (Japan) Futoshi Ikeda	

=== Corporate Icon Award ===
Year	Name	Ref.
2014	(Japan) TV Asahi (Japan) NHK	

=== Sportswriter of the Year ===
Year	Name	Ref.
1996	(Bangladesh) Azam Mahmood	

== See also ==
- Asian Football Hall of Fame
