= Asian Young Footballer of the Year =

Asian football award

The Asian Young Footballer of the Year award, officially known as the AFC Youth Player of the Year award, is presented to the best young football player in Asia. It has been awarded by the Asian Football Confederation (AFC) since 1995. It is usually presented during the AFC Annual Awards in November or December.

== Overall winners (1995–2007) ==
Year	Player	Gender	Nation	Club	Ref.
1995	Mohammed Al-Kathiri	Man	Oman		
1996	Bamrung Boonprom	Man	Thailand	(Thailand) Bangkok Bank	
1997	Mehdi Mahdavikia	Man	Iran	(Iran) Persepolis	
1998	Shinji Ono	Man	Japan	(Japan) Urawa Red Diamonds	
1999	Waleed Hamzah	Man	Qatar	(Qatar) Al-Arabi	
2000	Ryoichi Maeda	Man	Japan	(Japan) Jubilo Iwata	
2001	Du Wei	Man	China	(China) Shanghai Shenhua	
2002	Lee Chun-soo	Man	South Korea	(South Korea) Ulsan Hyundai Horang-i	
2003	Yoshito Okubo	Man	Japan	(Japan) Cerezo Osaka	
2004	Park Chu-young	Man	South Korea	(South Korea) Korea University	
2005	Choe Myong-ho	Man	North Korea	(North Korea) Kyonggongop	
2006	Ma Xiaoxu	Woman	China	(China) Dalian Shide	
2007	Kim Kum-il	Man	North Korea	(North Korea) April 25	

== Men's winners ==
Year	Player	Nation	Club	Ref.
2008	Ahmad Khalil	United Arab Emirates	(United Arab Emirates) Al-Ahli	
2009	Ki Sung-yueng	South Korea	(South Korea) FC Seoul	
2010	Jong Il-gwan	North Korea	(North Korea) Rimyongsu	
2011	Hideki Ishige	Japan	(Japan) Shimizu S-Pulse	
2012	Mohannad Abdul-Raheem	Iraq	(Iraq) Duhok SC	
2013	Ali Adnan Kadhim	Iraq	(Turkey) Çaykur Rizespor	
2014	Ahmed Moein	Qatar	(Belgium) Eupen	
2015	Dostonbek Khamdamov	Uzbekistan	(Uzbekistan) Bunyodkor	
2016	Ritsu Dōan	Japan	(Japan) Gamba Osaka	
2017	Lee Seung-woo	South Korea	(Italy) Hellas Verona	
2018	Turki Al-Ammar	Saudi Arabia	(Saudi Arabia) Al-Shabab	
2019	Lee Kang-in	South Korea	(Spain) Valencia	
2020	Not awarded			
2021	Not awarded			
2022	Kuryu Matsuki	Japan	(Japan) FC Tokyo	
2023	Abbosbek Fayzullaev	Uzbekistan	(Russia) CSKA Moscow	
2024	Not awarded			
2025	Alexander Badolato	Australia	(Australia) Newcastle Jets	
2026	Ryūnosuke Satō	Japan	(Spain) Valencia	

== Women's winners ==
Year	Player	Nation	Club	Ref.
2008	Mana Iwabuchi	Japan	(Japan) Nippon TV Beleza	
2009	Mana Iwabuchi	Japan	(Japan) Nippon TV Beleza	
2010	Yeo Min-ji	South Korea	(South Korea) Haman Daesan High School	
2011	Caitlin Foord	Australia	(Australia) Sydney FC	
2012	Hanae Shibata	Japan	(Japan) Urawa Red Diamonds	
2013	Jang Sel-gi	South Korea	(South Korea) Gangwon State University	
2014	Hina Sugita	Japan	(Japan) Fujieda Junshin High School	
2015	Rikako Kobayashi	Japan	(Japan) Tokiwagi Gakuen High School	
2016	Fuka Nagano	Japan	(Japan) Urawa Red Diamonds	
2017	Sung Hyang-sim	North Korea	(North Korea) Pyongyang City	
2018	Saori Takarada	Japan	(Japan) Cerezo Osaka Sakai	
2019	Jun Endo	Japan	(Japan) Nippon TV Beleza	
2020	Not awarded			
2021	Not awarded			
2022	Maika Hamano	Japan	(Japan) INAC Kobe Leonessa	
2023	Chae Un-yong	North Korea	(North Korea) Wolmido SC	
2024	Not awarded			
2025	Choe Il-son	North Korea	(North Korea) April 25	
2026	Yu Jong-hyang	North Korea	(North Korea) April 25	

== Wins by nationality ==
Nation	Overall	Men	Women	Total
Japan	3	4	9	16
South Korea	2	3	2	7
North Korea	2	1	4	7
Australia	0	1	1	2
China	2	0	0	2
Iraq	0	2	0	2
Qatar	1	1	0	2
Uzbekistan	0	2	0	2
Iran	1	0	0	1
Oman	1	0	0	1
Saudi Arabia	0	1	0	1
Thailand	1	0	0	1
United Arab Emirates	0	1	0	1

== See also ==
- AFC Annual Awards
