= Asian Footballer of the Year =

Annual association football award

The Asian Footballer of the Year award is an annual prize awarded to the best Asian player in a calendar year.

== History ==
A football handbook took a poll about who was the best Asian footballer in 1985, and this poll is regarded as the origin of the Asian footballer award. However, it was not a selection of clear process or official organization, and is generally excluded from the list. The award began in 1988 through International Federation of Football History & Statistics (IFFHS) with sport magazines and journalists, then the presenter was changed to the Asian Football Confederation (AFC) in 1994.

Since 2005, the award gives its qualification to nominees who attend the awards ceremony, and so the rule caused much controversy about excluding players who could not attend the ceremony by playing for European clubs. Among them, Park Ji-sung and Shunsuke Nakamura were nominated for Ballon d'Or. The AFC is awarding the "Asian International Player of the Year" award to reduce the controversy since 2012, but AFC awards were still having problems that the process and criteria of selection were obscure. Eventually, the "Best Footballer in Asia" award inspired by Ballon d'Or was made in 2013.

When continental confederations including AFC cancelled their awards ceremony due to the COVID-19 pandemic in 2020, IFFHS restarted to select the Players of the Year about the world and each continent.

== Winners ==
=== IFFHS award ===
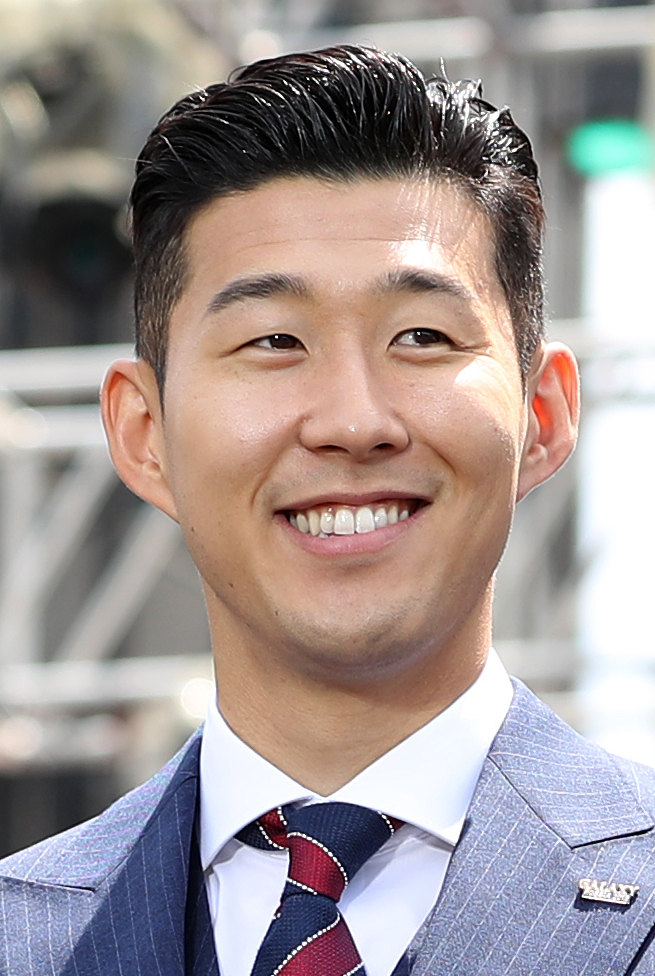
Son Heung-min won the IFFHS Asian Player of the Year award in 2020, 2021 and 2022.

The IFFHS Asian Player of the Year is an annual prize presented by International Federation of Football History & Statistics (IFFHS). It had originally been the predecessor of the AFC Player of the Year, and was revived when the AFC award was halted between 2020 and 2022.

Year	Rank	Player	Team	Points	Ref.
1988	1st	(Iraq) Ahmed Radhi	(Iraq) Al-Rasheed	26	
1988	2nd	(South Korea) Kim Joo-sung	(South Korea) Daewoo Royals	16	
1988	3rd	(Saudi Arabia) Majed Abdullah	(Saudi Arabia) Al Nassr	14	
1989	1st	(South Korea) Kim Joo-sung	(South Korea) Daewoo Royals	38	
1989	2nd	(Saudi Arabia) Majed Abdullah	(Saudi Arabia) Al Nassr	12	
1989	3rd	(Iraq) Ahmed Radhi	(Iraq) Al-Rasheed	6	
1990	1st	(South Korea) Kim Joo-sung	(South Korea) Daewoo Royals	36	
1990	2nd	(Iran) Farshad Pious	(Iran) Persepolis	28	
1990	3rd	(United Arab Emirates) Adnan Al-Talyani	(United Arab Emirates) Al-Shaab	16	
1991	1st	(South Korea) Kim Joo-sung	(South Korea) Daewoo Royals	31	
1991	2nd	(South Korea) Chung Yong-hwan	(South Korea) Daewoo Royals	28	
1991	3rd	(Iran) Samad Marfavi	(Iran) Esteghlal	16	
1992	1st	(Japan) Kazuyoshi Miura	(Japan) Verdy Kawasaki	30	
1992	2nd	(Saudi Arabia) Fahad Al-Bishi	(Saudi Arabia) Al Nassr	17	
1992	3rd	(Iran) Mehdi Fonounizadeh	(Iran) Esteghlal	13	
Not awarded from 1993 to 2019
2020	1st	(South Korea) Son Heung-min	(England) Tottenham Hotspur	—	
2020	—	(Iran) Sardar Azmoun	(Russia) Zenit Saint Petersburg	—	
2020	—	(Japan) Takumi Minamino	(England) Liverpool	—	
2021	1st	(South Korea) Son Heung-min	(England) Tottenham Hotspur	—	
2022	1st	(South Korea) Son Heung-min	(England) Tottenham Hotspur	—	

=== AFC award ===
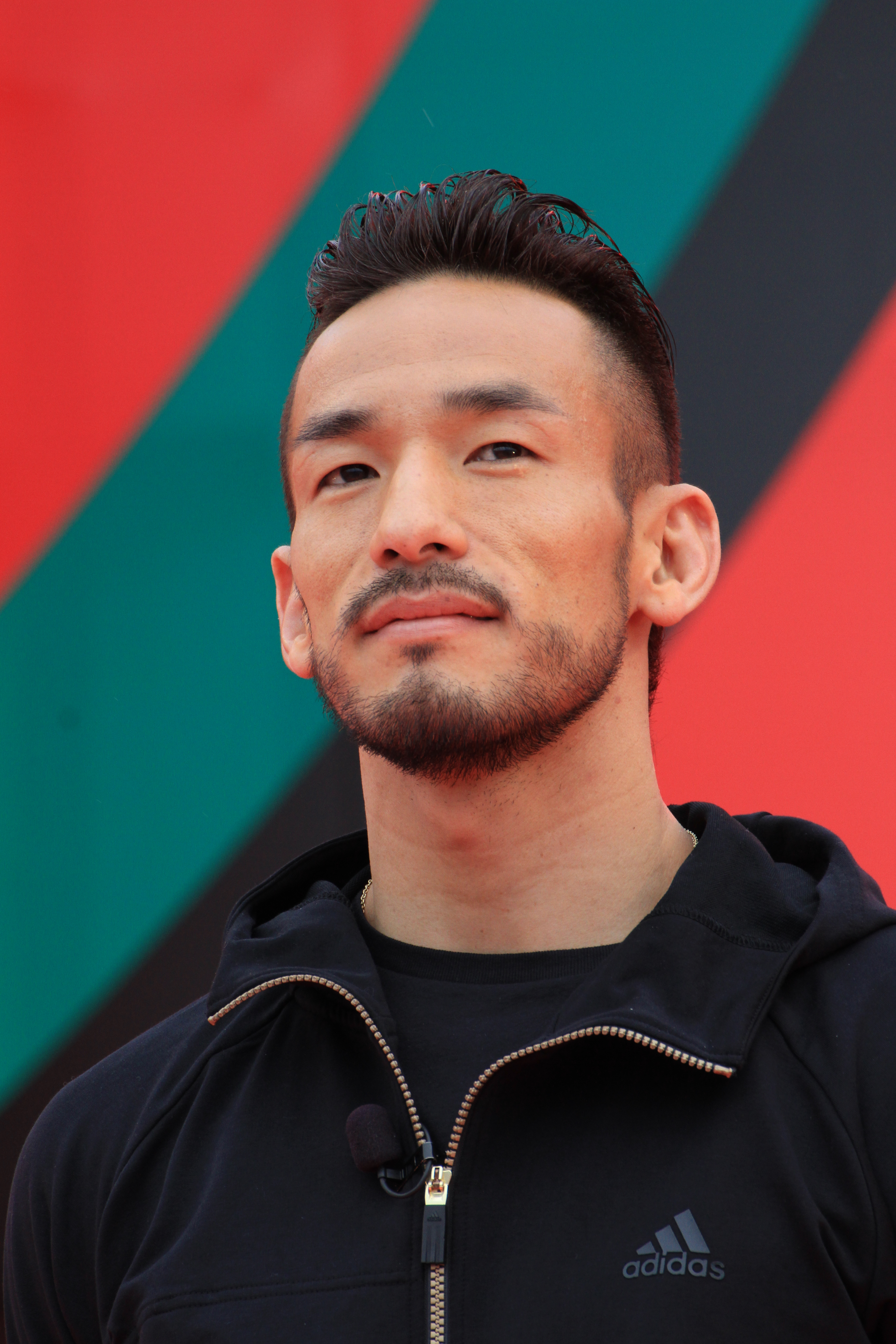
Hidetoshi Nakata won the AFC Player of the Year award in 1997 and 1998.

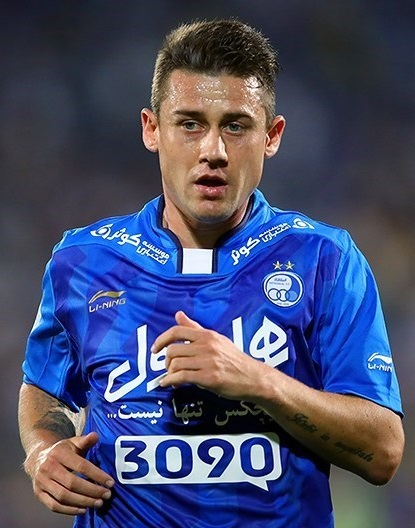
Server Djeparov won the AFC Player of the Year award in 2008 and 2011.

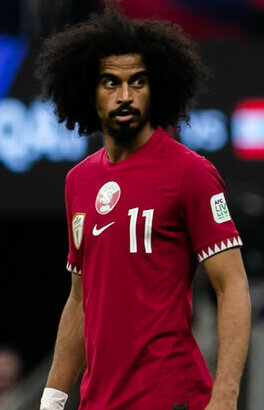
Akram Afif won the AFC Player of the Year award in 2019 and 2023.

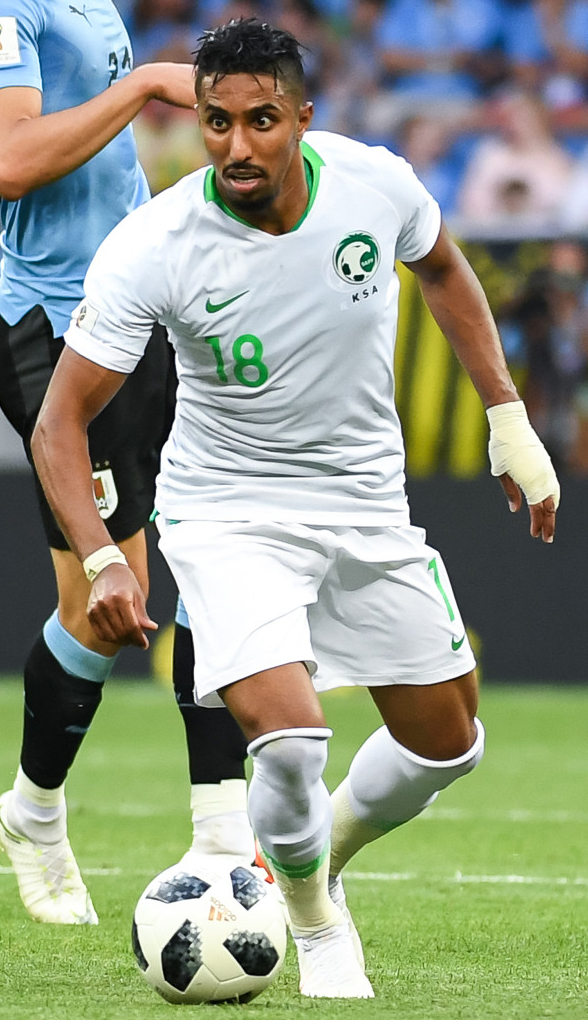
Salem Al-Dawsari won the AFC Player of the Year award in 2022 and 2025.

The AFC Player of the Year is an annual prize presented by Asian Football Confederation (AFC). It is awarded to the Asian player who has the best performance at AFC club(s) in a calendar year.

Year	Rank	Player	Team	Ref.
1994	1st	(Saudi Arabia) Saeed Owairan	(Saudi Arabia) Al Shabab	
1995	1st	(Japan) Masami Ihara	(Japan) Yokohama Marinos	
1996	1st	(Iran) Khodadad Azizi	(Iran) Bahman	
1996	—	(Iran) Ali Daei	(Qatar) Al Sadd	
1996	—	(South Korea) Ko Jeong-woon	(South Korea) Cheonan Ilhwa Chunma	
1996	—	(Saudi Arabia) Mohamed Al-Deayea	(Saudi Arabia) Al-Tai	
1996	—	(Saudi Arabia) Yousuf Al-Thunayan	(Saudi Arabia) Al Hilal	
1997	1st	(Japan) Hidetoshi Nakata	(Japan) Shonan Bellmare	
1997	—	(South Korea) Choi Yong-soo	(South Korea) Sangmu FC	
1997	—	(Iran) Karim Bagheri	(Germany) Arminia Bielefeld	
1997	—	(Iran) Khodadad Azizi	(Germany) 1. FC Köln	
1998	1st	(Japan) Hidetoshi Nakata	(Italy) Perugia	
1998	—	(Iran) Ali Daei	(Germany) Bayern Munich	
1998	—	(China) Fan Zhiyi	(England) Crystal Palace	
1998	—	(Kuwait) Jasem Al Huwaidi	(Kuwait) Al-Salmiya	
1999	1st	(Iran) Ali Daei	(Germany) Hertha BSC	
1999	—	(Kuwait) Bashar Abdullah	(Kuwait) Al-Salmiya	
1999	—	(Japan) Hidetoshi Nakata	(Italy) Perugia	
1999	—	(South Korea) Hwang Sun-hong	(Japan) Cerezo Osaka	
1999	—	(Japan) Masashi Nakayama	(Japan) Júbilo Iwata	
1999	—	(China) Sun Wen (Note: The only woman player to be nominated for the award.)	(China) Shanghai SVA	
2000	1st	(Saudi Arabia) Nawaf Al-Temyat	(Saudi Arabia) Al Hilal	
2000	—	(Japan) Hiroshi Nanami	(Japan) Júbilo Iwata	
2000	—	(South Korea) Lee Dong-gook	(South Korea) Pohang Steelers	
2000	—	(Japan) Ryuzo Morioka	(Japan) Shimizu S-Pulse	
2001	1st	(China) Fan Zhiyi	(Scotland) Dundee	
2001	—	(Saudi Arabia) Abdullah Al-Shehan	(Saudi Arabia) Al Shabab	
2001	—	(Iran) Ali Karimi	(United Arab Emirates) Al Ahli	
2001	—	(China) Li Tie	(China) Liaoning Fushun Tegang	
2001	—	(Uzbekistan) Mirjalol Qosimov	(Russia) Krylia Sovetov Samara	
2002	1st	(Japan) Shinji Ono	(Netherlands) Feyenoord	
2002	—	(South Korea) Ahn Jung-hwan	(Italy) Perugia	
2002	—	(Japan) Junichi Inamoto	(England) Fulham	
2002	—	(China) Li Tie	(England) Everton	
2003	1st	(Iran) Mehdi Mahdavikia	(Germany) Hamburger SV	
2003	—	(Uzbekistan) Maxim Shatskikh	(Ukraine) Dynamo Kyiv	
2003	—	(Thailand) Therdsak Chaiman	(Thailand) BEC Tero Sasana	
2004	1st	(Iran) Ali Karimi	(United Arab Emirates) Al Ahli	
2004	—	(Bahrain) A'ala Hubail	(Bahrain) Al-Ahli	
2004	—	(Japan) Shunsuke Nakamura	(Italy) Reggina	
2005	1st	(Saudi Arabia) Hamad Al-Montashari	(Saudi Arabia) Al-Ittihad	
2005	2nd	(Uzbekistan) Maxim Shatskikh (Note: Only two players of the shortlist competed for the award under a new rule to omit nominees who didn't attend the ceremony.)	(Ukraine) Dynamo Kyiv	
2006	1st	(Qatar) Khalfan Ibrahim	(Qatar) Al Sadd	
2006	—	(Kuwait) Bader Al-Mutawa	(Kuwait) Qadsia	
2006	—	(Saudi Arabia) Mohammad Al-Shalhoub	(Saudi Arabia) Al Hilal	
2007	1st	(Saudi Arabia) Yasser Al-Qahtani	(Saudi Arabia) Al Hilal	
2007	—	(Iraq) Nashat Akram	(United Arab Emirates) Al Ain	
2007	—	(Iraq) Younis Mahmoud	(Qatar) Al-Gharafa	
2008	1st	(Uzbekistan) Server Djeparov	(Uzbekistan) Bunyodkor	
2008	—	(United Arab Emirates) Ismail Matar	(United Arab Emirates) Al Wahda	
2008	—	(Qatar) Sebastián Soria	Qatar SC	
2008	—	(Japan) Yasuhito Endō	(Japan) Gamba Osaka	
2008	—	(Japan) Yuji Nakazawa	(Japan) Yokohama F. Marinos	
2009	1st	(Japan) Yasuhito Endō	(Japan) Gamba Osaka	
2009	2nd	(Japan) Kengo Nakamura (Note: Points of the AFC were exceptionally released in this year. Nakamura and Adnan were tied for second with 100 points each behind Endō who received 120 points.)	(Japan) Kawasaki Frontale	
2009	2nd	(Bahrain) Sayed Mohamed Adnan	(Qatar) Al-Khor	
2010	1st	(Australia) Saša Ognenovski	(South Korea) Seongnam Ilhwa Chunma	
2010	—	(Kuwait) Bader Al-Mutawa	(Kuwait) Qadsia	
2010	—	(Iran) Farhad Majidi	(Iran) Esteghlal	
2010	—	(Iran) Farshid Talebi	(Iran) Zob Ahan	
2010	—	(Bahrain) Hussain Salman	(Bahrain) Al-Riffa	
2011	1st	(Uzbekistan) Server Djeparov	(Saudi Arabia) Al Shabab	
2011	2nd	(Iran) Hadi Aghily	(Qatar) Al-Arabi	
2012	1st	(South Korea) Lee Keun-ho	(South Korea) Ulsan Hyundai	
2012	—	(Iran) Ali Karimi	(Iran) Persepolis	
2012	—	(China) Zheng Zhi	(China) Guangzhou Evergrande	
2013	1st	(China) Zheng Zhi	(China) Guangzhou Evergrande	
2013	—	(South Korea) Ha Dae-sung	(South Korea) FC Seoul	
2013	—	(Iran) Javad Nekounam	(Iran) Esteghlal	
2014	1st	(Saudi Arabia) Nasser Al-Shamrani	(Saudi Arabia) Al Hilal	
2014	—	(United Arab Emirates) Ismail Ahmed	(United Arab Emirates) Al Ain	
2014	—	(Qatar) Khalfan Ibrahim	(Qatar) Al Sadd	
2015	1st	(United Arab Emirates) Ahmed Khalil	(United Arab Emirates) Al Ahli	
2015	—	(United Arab Emirates) Omar Abdulrahman	(United Arab Emirates) Al Ain	
2015	—	(China) Zheng Zhi	(China) Guangzhou Evergrande	
2016	1st	(United Arab Emirates) Omar Abdulrahman	(United Arab Emirates) Al Ain	
2016	—	(Iraq) Hammadi Ahmed	(Iraq) Al-Quwa Al-Jawiya	
2016	—	(China) Wu Lei	(China) Shanghai SIPG	
2017	1st	(Syria) Omar Kharbin	(Saudi Arabia) Al Hilal	
2017	—	(United Arab Emirates) Omar Abdulrahman	(United Arab Emirates) Al Ain	
2017	—	(China) Wu Lei	(China) Shanghai SIPG	
2018	1st	(Qatar) Abdelkarim Hassan	(Qatar) Al Sadd	
2018	—	(Japan) Kento Misao	(Japan) Kashima Antlers	
2018	—	(Japan) Yuma Suzuki	(Japan) Kashima Antlers	
2019	1st	(Qatar) Akram Afif	(Qatar) Al Sadd	
2019	—	(Iran) Alireza Beiranvand	(Iran) Persepolis	
2019	—	(Japan) Tomoaki Makino	(Japan) Urawa Red Diamonds	
2020	Not awarded			
2021	Not awarded			
2022	1st	(Saudi Arabia) Salem Al-Dawsari	(Saudi Arabia) Al Hilal	
2022	—	(Qatar) Almoez Ali	(Qatar) Al-Duhail	
2022	—	(Australia) Mathew Leckie	(Australia) Melbourne City	
2023	1st	(Qatar) Akram Afif	(Qatar) Al Sadd	
2023	—	(South Korea) Seol Young-woo	(South Korea) Ulsan HD	
2023	—	(Jordan) Yazan Al-Naimat	(Qatar) Al Ahli	
2024	Not awarded			
2025	1st	(Saudi Arabia) Salem Al-Dawsari	(Saudi Arabia) Al Hilal	
2025	—	(Qatar) Akram Afif	(Qatar) Al Sadd	
2025	—	(Malaysia) Arif Aiman	(Malaysia) Johor Darul Ta'zim	
2026	1st	(Iran) Alireza Beiranvand	(Iran) Tractor s.c	
2026	—	(Saudi Arabia) Firas Al-Buraikan	(Saudi Arabia) Al-Ahli	
2026	—	(Saudi Arabia) Salem Al-Dawsari	(Saudi Arabia) Al Hilal	

=== AFC award (international) ===
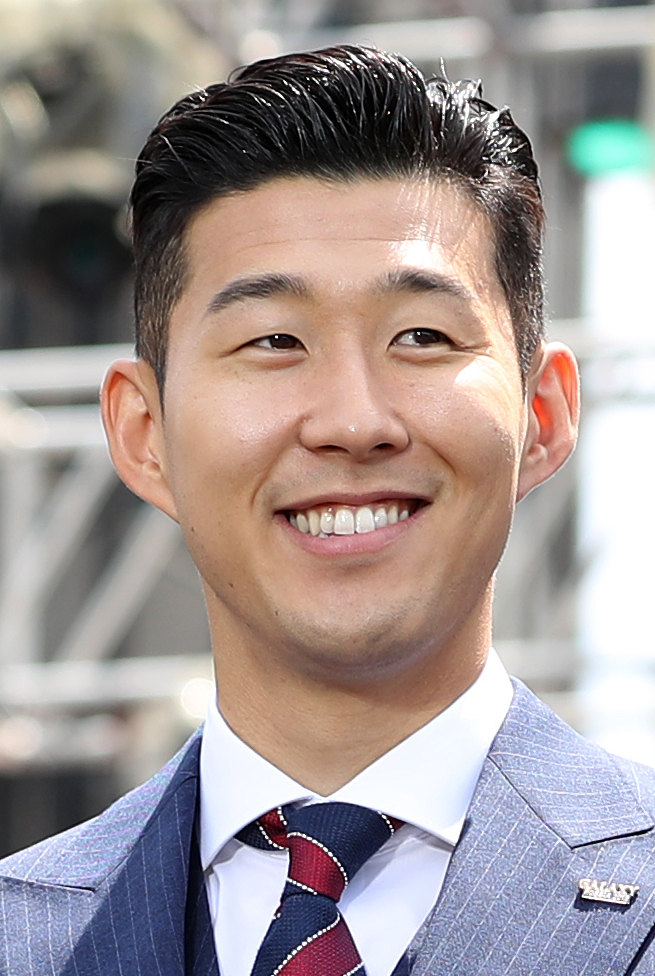
Son Heung-min won the AFC Asian International Player of the Year award in 2015, 2017, 2019 and 2023.

The AFC Asian International Player of the Year is an annual prize presented by Asian Football Confederation (AFC). It is awarded to the Asian player who has the best performance outside Asia in a calendar year.

Year	Rank	Player	Team	Ref.
2012	1st	(Japan) Shinji Kagawa	(England) Manchester United	
2012	—	(Australia) Mark Schwarzer	(England) Fulham	
2012	—	(Japan) Yuto Nagatomo	(Italy) Internazionale	
2013	1st	(Japan) Yuto Nagatomo	(Italy) Internazionale	
2013	—	(Japan) Keisuke Honda	(Russia) CSKA Moscow	
2013	—	(South Korea) Son Heung-min	(Germany) Bayer Leverkusen	
2014	1st	(Australia) Mile Jedinak	(England) Crystal Palace	
2014	—	(South Korea) Ki Sung-yueng	(England) Swansea City	
2014	—	(Australia) Tim Cahill	(United States) New York Red Bulls	
2015	1st	(South Korea) Son Heung-min	(England) Tottenham Hotspur	
2015	—	(South Korea) Ki Sung-yueng	(England) Swansea City	
2015	—	(Australia) Massimo Luongo	(England) Queens Park Rangers	
2016	1st	(Japan) Shinji Okazaki	(England) Leicester City	
2016	—	(Japan) Shinji Kagawa	(Germany) Borussia Dortmund	
2016	—	(South Korea) Son Heung-min	(England) Tottenham Hotspur	
2017	1st	(South Korea) Son Heung-min	(England) Tottenham Hotspur	
2017	—	(Australia) Aaron Mooy	(England) Huddersfield Town	
2017	—	(Japan) Shinji Kagawa	(Germany) Borussia Dortmund	
2018	1st	(Japan) Makoto Hasebe	(Germany) Eintracht Frankfurt	
2019	1st	(South Korea) Son Heung-min	(England) Tottenham Hotspur	
2019	—	(Japan) Makoto Hasebe	(Germany) Eintracht Frankfurt	
2019	—	(Iran) Sardar Azmoun	(Russia) Zenit Saint Petersburg	
2020	Not awarded			
2021	Not awarded			
2022	1st	(South Korea) Kim Min-jae	(Italy) Napoli	
2022	—	(Japan) Kaoru Mitoma	(England) Brighton & Hove Albion	
2022	—	(Iran) Mehdi Taremi	(Portugal) Porto	
2023	1st	(South Korea) Son Heung-min	(England) Tottenham Hotspur	
2023	—	(Iran) Mehdi Taremi	(Portugal) Porto	
2023	—	(Jordan) Musa Al-Taamari	(France) Montpellier	
2024	Not awarded			
2025	1st	(South Korea) Lee Kang-in	(France) Paris Saint-Germain	
2025	—	(Iran) Mehdi Taremi	(Greece) Olympiacos	
2025	—	(Japan) Takefusa Kubo	(Spain) Real Sociedad	
2026	1st	(South Korea) Lee Kang-in	(Spain) Atlético Madrid	
2026	—	(Japan) Ayase Ueda	(France) Lille	
2026	—	(South Korea) Hwang In-beom	(Portugal) Porto	

== Statistics ==
=== Wins by player ===
The IFFHS award is marked with an asterisk (*).

Player	Wins	Years won
(South Korea) Son Heung-min	7	2015, 2017, 2019, 2020*, 2021*, 2022*, 2023
(South Korea) Kim Joo-sung	3	1989*, 1990*, 1991*
(Japan) Hidetoshi Nakata	2	1997, 1998
(Uzbekistan) Server Djeparov	2	2008, 2011
(Qatar) Akram Afif	2	2019, 2023
(Saudi Arabia) Salem Al-Dawsari	2	2022, 2025
(South Korea) Lee Kang-in	2	2025, 2026
(Iraq) Ahmed Radhi	1	1988*
(Japan) Kazuyoshi Miura	1	1992*
(Saudi Arabia) Saeed Owairan	1	1994
(Japan) Masami Ihara	1	1995
(Iran) Khodadad Azizi	1	1996
(Iran) Ali Daei	1	1999
(Saudi Arabia) Nawaf Al-Temyat	1	2000
(China) Fan Zhiyi	1	2001
(Japan) Shinji Ono	1	2002
(Iran) Mehdi Mahdavikia	1	2003
(Iran) Ali Karimi	1	2004
(Saudi Arabia) Hamad Al-Montashari	1	2005
(Qatar) Khalfan Ibrahim	1	2006
(Saudi Arabia) Yasser Al-Qahtani	1	2007
(Japan) Yasuhito Endō	1	2009
(Australia) Sasa Ognenovski	1	2010
(South Korea) Lee Keun-ho	1	2012
(Japan) Shinji Kagawa	1	2012
(Japan) Yuto Nagatomo	1	2013
(China) Zheng Zhi	1	2013
(Australia) Mile Jedinak	1	2014
(Saudi Arabia) Nasser Al-Shamrani	1	2014
(United Arab Emirates) Ahmed Khalil	1	2015
(United Arab Emirates) Omar Abdulrahman	1	2016
(Japan) Shinji Okazaki	1	2016
(Syria) Omar Kharbin	1	2017
(Qatar) Abdelkarim Hassan	1	2018
(Japan) Makoto Hasebe	1	2018
(South Korea) Kim Min-jae	1	2022
(Iran) Alireza Beiranvand	1	2026

=== Wins by nationality ===
Country	Wins	Players
South Korea	14	5
Japan	10	9
Saudi Arabia	7	6
Iran	5	5
Qatar	4	3
Australia	2	2
China	2	2
United Arab Emirates	2	2
Uzbekistan	2	1
Iraq	1	1
Syria	1	1

== See also ==
- Best Footballer in Asia
- International Federation of Football History & Statistics
- Asian Football Confederation
- AFC Annual Awards
