= Asian Football Hall of Fame =

Hall of fame for Asian professional footballers

AFC Hall of Fame
- Established: 30 November 2014
- Founder: Asian Football Confederation
- Inductees: 10

The Asian Football Hall of Fame, officially known as AFC Hall of Fame, is a hall of fame for Asian professional footballers maintained by Asian Football Confederation. AFC officially created it for 60th anniversary of its foundation on 30 November 2014.

== Inductees ==
A total of 10 players were inaugural inductees in 2014. Inductees are listed according to the date of their induction and then sorted according to last name alphabetically.

Year	Inductee	Nationality	Position	Gender	Career (Note: The years of the player's first and last appearance for a professional club or national team.)	AFC awards (Note: Other individual achievements awarded by Asian Football Confederation.)
2014	Homayoun Behzadi	Iran	Midfielder; Forward	Man	1958–1972	Asian Cup top scorer: 1968; Asian All-Star: 1967
2014	Bhaichung Bhutia	India	Forward	Man	1993–2013	—
2014	Ali Daei	Iran	Forward	Man	1988–2007	Player of the Year: 1999; Asian Cup top scorer: 1996; Asian Cup All-Star Team: 1996; Asian All-Star: 1993, 1998, 1999
2014	Myung-bo Hong	South Korea	Defender	Man	1992–2004	Asian Cup All-Star Team: 2000; Asian All-Star: 1993, 1997, 2000
2014	Sami Jaber	Saudi Arabia	Forward	Man	1988–2008	—
2014	Harry Kewell	Australia	Midfielder; Forward	Man	1996–2014	Asian Cup All-Star Team: 2007
2014	Yasuhiko Okudera	Japan	Midfielder	Man	1970–1988	—
2014	Homare Sawa	Japan	Midfielder	Woman	1991–2015	Women's Asian Cup MVP: 2008; Women's Player of the Year: 2004, 2009
2014	Chin Ann Soh	Malaysia	Defender	Man	1968–1988	Asian Cup All-Star Team: 1980; Asian All-Star: 1982
2014	Wen Sun	China	Forward	Woman	1989–2006	Women's Player of the Year: 1999

== Statistics ==
=== Inductees by country ===
Rank	Country	Inductees		
Rank	Country	Men	Women	Total
1	Iran	2	0	2
1	Japan	1	1	2
3	Australia	1	0	1
3	China	0	1	1
3	India	1	0	1
3	Malaysia	1	0	1
3	Saudi Arabia	1	0	1
3	South Korea	1	0	1

== See also ==
- AFC Annual Awards
