= 2012 AFC Annual Awards =

- Date: 29 November 2012
- Location: Kuala Lumpur, Malaysia
- Presented by: Asian Football Confederation

Highlights
- AFC Player of the Year: Men's: (South Korea) Lee Keun-ho; Women's: (Japan) Aya Miyama
- AFC Coach of the Year: Men's: (South Korea) Kim Ho-kon; Women's: (Japan) Asako Takakura
- AFC Youth Player of the Year: Men's: (Iraq) Mohannad Abdul-Raheem; Women's: (Japan) Hanae Shibata
- AFC International Player of the Year: (Japan) Shinji Kagawa
- AFC Futsal Player of the Year: (Japan) Rafael Henmi
- Website: www.the-afc.com

The 2012 AFC Annual Awards was the top football players and coaches of the year in Asia.

Among five candidates, Lee Keun-Ho win the Asian Footballer of the Year award for his role in winning AFC Champions League for his club team.

Aya Miyama, Japan women's football team player which won 2011 FIFA Women's World Cup was awarded Asian Women Footballer of the Year for the second time in a row.

Hanae Shibata and Mohannad Abdul-Raheem becomes the Youth Player of the Year. Ulsan Hyundai which won 2012 AFC Champions League was named as the Club of the Year. Both Japan and South Korea's Olympic teams was named as women's and men's team was named as National Team of the Year.

Yuichi Nishimura and Sachiko Yamagishi were named as men's referee of the year. Kim Ho-Kon was awarded as the Coach of the Year. Rafael Henmi was awarded as Futsal Player of the Year. Giti Pasand, winner of the 2012 AFC Futsal Club Championship was named as Futsal Club of the Year. Fair Play Award was given to the Uzbekistan national football team. Football Federation of Iran was awarded as the Best Football Federation in Asia.

== Winners ==
=== Men ===
==== Asian Footballer of the Year ====
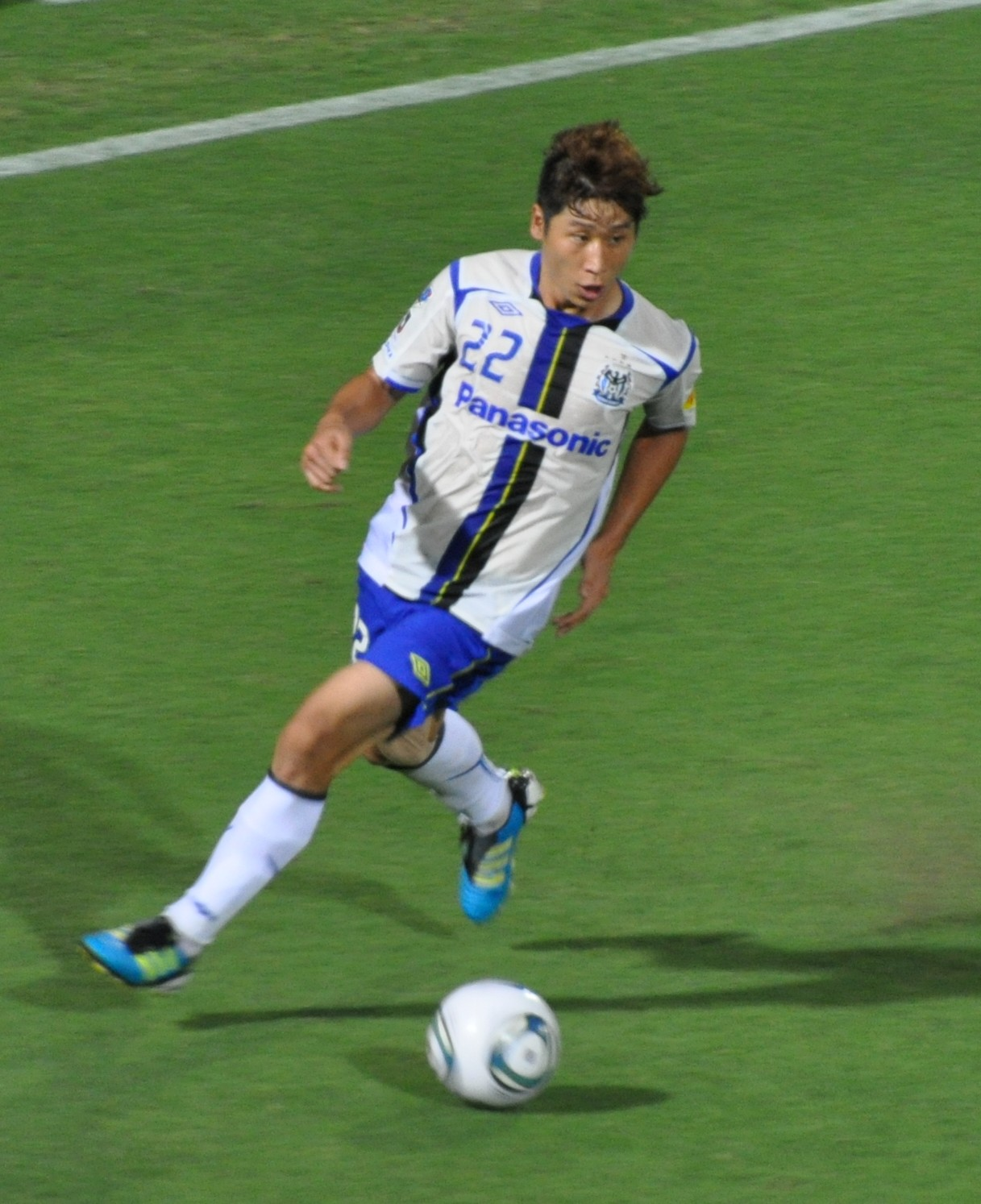
Lee Keun-Ho

Rank	Player	Nationality	Club	Notes
1st	Lee Keun-Ho	South Korea	(South Korea) Ulsan Hyundai	
—	Ali Karimi	Iran	(Iran) Persepolis	
—	Zheng Zhi	China	(China) Guangzhou Evergrande	

==== International players ====
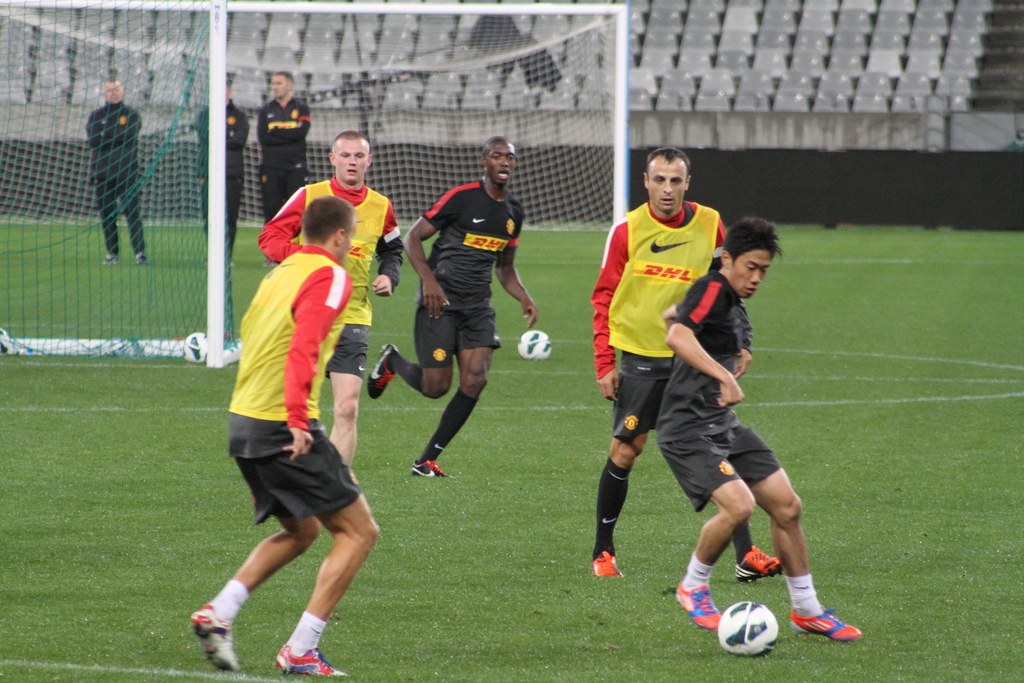
Shinji Kagawa

Rank	Player	Nationality	Club	Notes
1st	Shinji Kagawa	Japan	(Germany) Borussia Dortmund/ (England) Manchester United	
—	Mark Schwarzer	Australia	(England) Fulham	
—	Yuto Nagatomo	Japan	(Italy) Inter Milan	

==== Foreign players ====
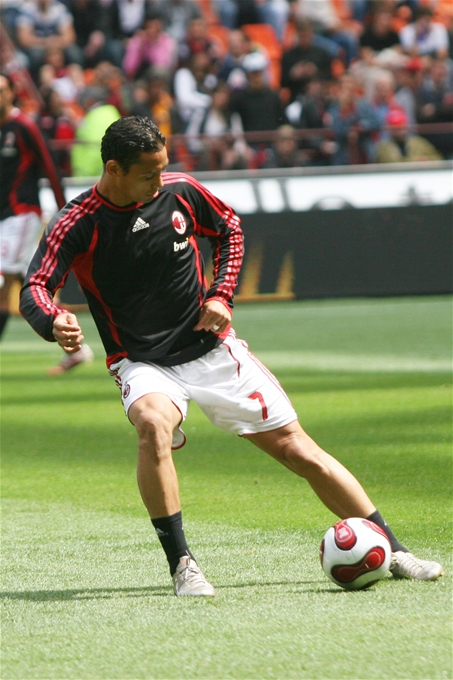
Ricardo Oliveira

Rank	Player	Nationality	Club	Notes
1st	Rogerinho	Brazil	Kuwait SC	
—	Ricardo Oliveira	Brazil	(United Arab Emirates) Al Jazira	
—	Bruno Correa	Brazil	(Iran) Sepahan/ (United Arab Emirates) Al Nasr	

=== Coach of the year ===
Rank	Coach	Nationality	Club	Notes
1st	Kim Ho-Kon	South Korea	(South Korea) Ulsan Hyundai	

=== National team of the year ===
Gender	Team	Nationality	Notes
Men	South Korea national under-23 football team	South Korea	
Women	Japan women's national football team	Japan	

=== Club of the year ===
Rank	Club	Nationality	Notea
1st	(South Korea) Ulsan Hyundai	South Korea	

=== Women ===
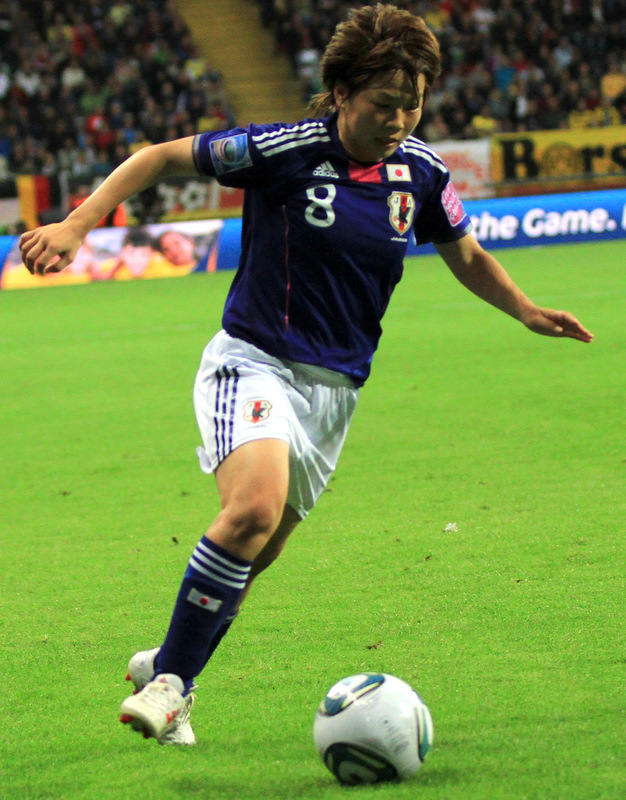
Aya Miyama

Rank	Player	Nationality	Club	Notes
1st	Aya Miyama	Japan	(Japan) Okayama Yunogo Belle	
—	Yuki Ogimi	Japan	(Germany) 1. FFC Turbine Potsdam	
—	Homare Sawa	Japan	(Japan) INAC Leonessa	

=== Young Player ===
Gender	Player	Nationality	Club
Men	Mohannad Abdul-Raheem	Iraq	(Iraq) Duhok SC
Women	Hanae Shibata	Japan	(Japan) Urawa Red Diamonds

=== Futsal Player ===
Player	Nationality	Club
Katsutoshi Rafael Henmi	Japan	(Japan) Nagoya Oceans

== See also ==
- Asian Footballer of the Year
- Asian Young Footballer of the Year
