= Hideki Ishige =

Japanese footballer

Hideki Ishige 石毛 秀樹
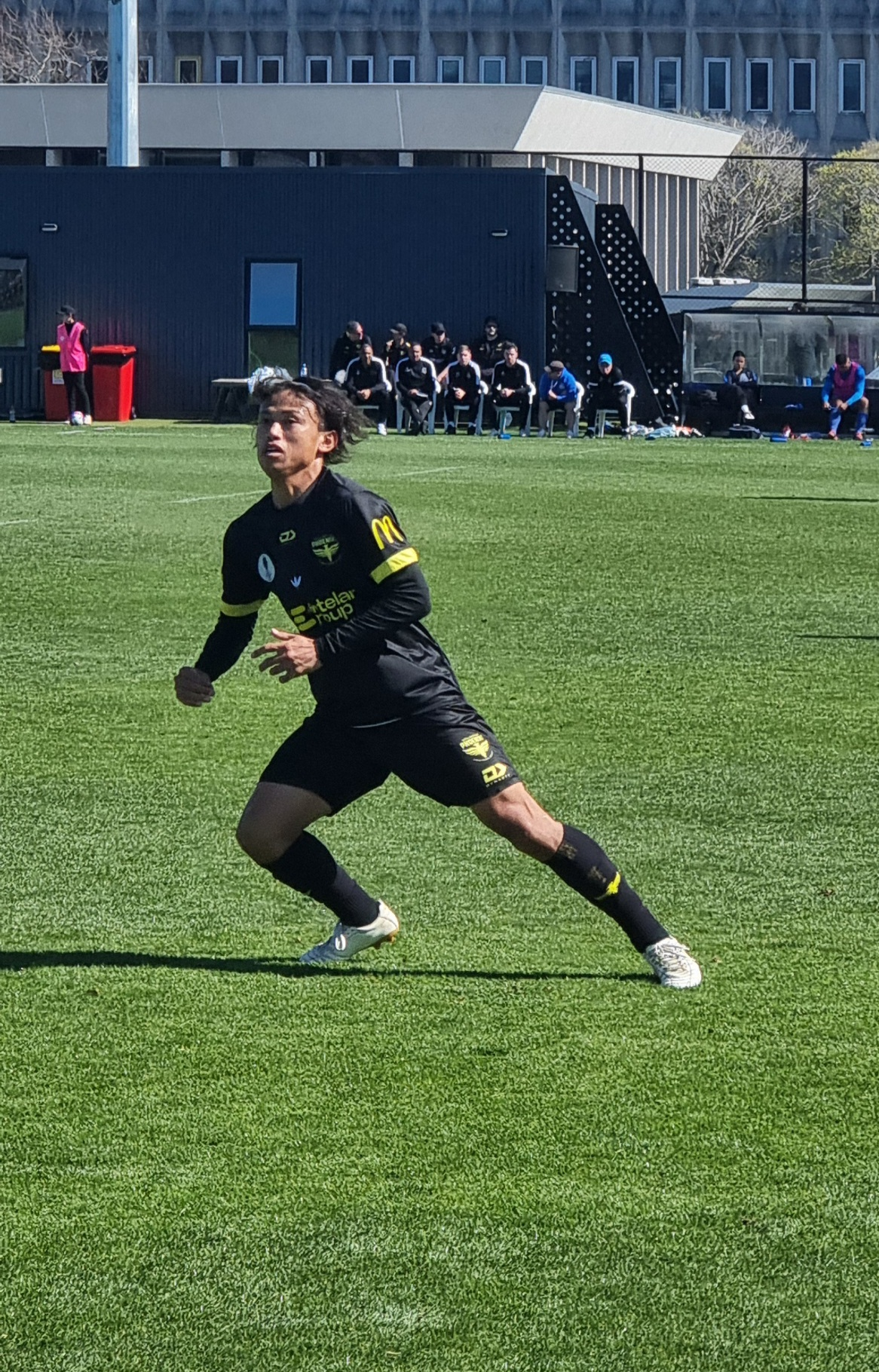
- Ishige playing for the Wellington Phoenix in 2025

Personal information
- Full name: Hideki Ishige
- Date of birth: 21 September 1994 (age 32)
- Place of birth: Fuji, Shizuoka, Japan
- Height: 1.70 m (5 ft 7 in)
- Position: Winger

Youth career
- –2011: Shimizu S-Pulse

Senior career*
Years	Team	Apps	(Gls)
2012–2021	Shimizu S-Pulse	141	(10)
2014–2015	→ J. League U-22 (loan)	8	(2)
2017	→ Fagiano Okayama (loan)	31	(2)
2021	→ Fagiano Okayama (loan)	14	(6)
2022–2024	Gamba Osaka	46	(3)
2024–2026	Wellington Phoenix	29	(2)

International career
2011	Japan U17	4	(3)
Medal record
Shimizu S-Pulse
Runner-up	J.League Cup	2012
- * Club domestic league appearances and goals as of 9 May 2025

Hideki Ishige (石毛 秀樹, Ishige Hideki; pronounced [iɕiɡe çideki]; born 21 September 1994) is a Japanese professional footballer who last played as a winger for A-League club Wellington Phoenix.

Primarily known for his time at Shimizu S-Pulse, Ishige has over 250 league appearances in his career.

== Career ==
=== Shimizu S-Pulse and loans ===
In November 2011, Ishige became the fifth Japanese player and the first Shimizu S-Pulse player to win the Asian Youth Player of the Year award. On 30 March 2012, he signed a professional C contract as a type-2 player with Shimizu S-Pulse. Ishige scored his first league goal against RB Omiya Ardija on 2 March 2013, scoring in the 74th minute.

On 14 March 2015, Ishige was announced at the J.League Under-22 team on a temporary loan spell.

On 30 December 2016, Ishige was announced at Fagiano Okayama on a one year loan spell.

On 25 July 2021, Ishige was announced on a second loan spell at Fagiano Okayama. He made 14 league appearances and scored 6 goals during his second loan spell with the club.

=== Gamba Osaka ===
On 27 December 2021, Ishige was announced at Gamba Osaka on a permanent transfer.

=== Wellington Phoenix ===
On 2 September 2024, Ishige was announced at Wellington Phoenix on a two year contract. On 22 December 2024, he scored his second league goal, a bicycle kick against Western Sydney Wanderers in the 59th minute.

On 2 November 2025, in a match against the Central Coast Mariners, Ishige suffered an ACL rupture. On 7 November, the Phoenix confirmed the injury ruled him out for the remainder of the 2025–26 season. Ishige had featured in all 29 A-League Men matches for the Phoenix since joining the club in 2024, and led the season with eight assists in his first campaign with the club. On 16 January 2026, Ishige's contract with the Wellington Phoenix was mutually terminated.

== International career ==
In June 2011, Ishige was called up to the Japan U-17 national team for the 2011 U-17 World Cup. He scored two goals and assisted the third in a win over New Zealand.

On 2 June 2014, Ishige was called up to the Japan U21 national team for a training camp.

== Career statistics ==
As of match played 23 March 2022

Appearances and goals by club, season and competition
Club	Season	League			National cup		League cup		Total	
Club	Season	Division	Apps	Goals	Apps	Goals	Apps	Goals	Apps	Goals
Japan			League		Emperor's Cup		J. League Cup		Total	
Shimizu S-Pulse	2012	J1 League	16	0	3	0	9	1	28	1
Shimizu S-Pulse	2013	J1 League	32	2	3	0	6	2	41	4
Shimizu S-Pulse	2014	J1 League	22	2	5	0	2	0	29	2
Shimizu S-Pulse	2015	J1 League	11	3	1	1	3	0	15	4
Shimizu S-Pulse	2016	J2 League	23	1	3	0	–		26	1
Shimizu S-Pulse	2018	J1 League	29	2	2	0	0	0	31	2
Shimizu S-Pulse	2019	J1 League	6	0	0	0	3	0	9	0
Shimizu S-Pulse	2020	J1 League	2	0	0	0	1	1	3	1
Shimizu S-Pulse	2021	J1 League	0	0	0	0	1	0	1	0
Shimizu S-Pulse	Total		141	10	17	1	25	4	183	15
J.League U-22 Selection (loan)	2014	J3 League	2	1	0	0	–		2	1
J.League U-22 Selection (loan)	2015	J3 League	6	1	0	0	–		6	1
J.League U-22 Selection (loan)	Total		8	2	0	0	0	0	8	2
Fagiano Okayama (loan)	2017	J2 League	31	2	0	0	–		31	2
Fagiano Okayama (loan)	2021	J2 League	14	6	1	0	–		15	6
Fagiano Okayama (loan)	Total		45	8	1	0	0	0	46	8
Gamba Osaka	2022	J1 League	4	0	0	0	2	0	6	0
Career total			198	20	18	1	27	4	243	25

== Honours ==
=== Individual ===
- Asian Young Footballer of the Year (1) : 2011
- J. League Cup New Hero Award (1) : 2012
