= Zainal Abidin Hassan =

Malaysian former footballer

Personal information
- Full name: Zainal Abidin Hassan bin Mohd Ali
- Date of birth: 9 November 1961 (age 64)
- Place of birth: Kuala Lumpur, Selangor, Federation of Malaya
- Positions: Defender; forward

Managerial career
- Years: Team
- 2001: Malaysia U17
- 2004–2006: Pahang FA (coach)
- 2006–2008: Pahang FA
- 2009–2010: Shahzan Muda
- 2011–2013: Pahang FA
- 2013–2014: Pahang FA (assistant head coach)
- 2014–2015: Pahang FA
- 2016: Selangor
- 2017–2018: Penang
- 2019–2021: Melaka United
- 2022: Penang
- 2025–: Immigration FC (technical director)

Datuk Zainal Abidin Hassan bin Mohd Ali (born 9 November 1961) is a Malaysian football coach and former player.

== Playing career ==
A versatile footballer who could play in multiple positions, Zainal Abidin is considered one of the best Malaysian footballers in the 80's and 90's. He began his football career in 1980 as a defender at Selangor FA. At only 18 years of age, Zainal made his international debut in the 1980 Merdeka Tournament against Indonesia. He played alongside legendary Malaysian footballers Mokhtar Dahari, R Arumugam, Soh Chin Aun and other recognised faces in Malaysian football. In 1983 Pahang FA head coach Frank Lord changed Zainal's position to a striker. This is where his career began to blossom, becoming one of the most respected strikers at the local and international level.

From the late 80's to early 90's, he regularly partnered with Dollah Salleh in front as they became a fierce striker partnership for Selangor FA and Pahang FA in M-League and also the national team in SEA Games, Asian Games and Merdeka Tournament. In the 1996 AFF Championship, Zainal Abidin was awarded the title of MVP of the tournament, captaining the national team from the centre-back position instead of his usual striking role. Three years later he was awarded the AFC Century Club Award.

During his international career, Zainal scored a total of 78 goals in 180 appearances for Malaysia (including non-FIFA 'A' international matches), according to Globe Soccer Awards in 2020. Against other nations' national 'A' teams, he scored 50 goals in 129 appearances.

He also played for the Malaysia national futsal team, and was in the squad that took part in the 1996 FIFA Futsal World Championship in Spain.

On 3 August 2021, he was inducted into the FIFA Century Club.

== Coaching career ==
He retired from football in 1999 and was selected to coach the Malaysian youth in 2001. In 2002, he was selected as the assistant coach for the Malaysia senior team. He later coached Pahang FA and brought them their first Malaysia Super League title. In 2006, he guided Pahang FA to win the Malaysian FA Cup. After the contract with Pahang FA ended, he reunited with his former striker partner Dollah Salleh while serving as manager and coach for Shahzan Muda FC.

In 2011, at age of 50 he returned to Pahang FA as assistant manager, where he worked again with Dollah, who was the current head coach. The partnership lasted until the end of 2013, when they helped Pahang win the 2013 Malaysia Cup; Pahang's first Malaysia Cup in 21 years. After Dollah left Pahang to coach PDRM FA and Ron Smith was appointed as the new Pahang head coach at the end of 2013, Zainal was appointed as his assistant head coach. But after Smith's contract was not renewed in March 2014, Zainal Abidin was appointed as Smith's replacement. With Pahang, he won the Malaysia Cup in 2014 and also the Malaysia FA Cup in the same year.

In 2016, Zainal Abidin made his return to Selangor as head coach, replacing Mehmet Durakovic. This was not without controversy, as negotiations between Zainal and Selangor was made public when Durakovic was still Selangor coach, and Durakovic's contract was terminated even after he won the 33rd Malaysia Cup title with Selangor in 2015. Zainal, however, was sacked in August the same year, after poor performances by the team in the Super League and Malaysia Cup.

Zainal Abidin then coached Penang FA from May 2017 until September 2018. In November 2018, he was unveiled as the new head coach of Melaka United. After two years with Melaka, he returned to coach Penang for a short period of time in the 2022 season.

== Personal life ==
Zainal Abidin's father is of Kenyan descent. His oldest brother Khalid Ali and oldest son Mohd Zaiza are also Malaysian footballers.

Zainal has been married to Zalina binti Zaini since 1985 and they have five children. In 2023, he married his second wife, Malaysian singer Fyna Jebat. However, their marriage only lasted a few months as Zainal divorced his second wife and ended their marriage later this year.

== Career statistics ==
=== International ===
Scores and results list Malaysia's goal tally first, score column indicates score after each Zainal Abidin Hassan goal.

List of international goals scored by Zainal Abidin Hassan
No.	Date	Venue	Opponent	Score	Result	Competition
1	13 November 1981	Bangkok, Thailand	Pakistan		2–3	1981 King's Cup
2	4 June 1983	Singapore	Thailand		1–1	1983 SEA Games
3	5 June 1983	Singapore	Brunei		5–0	1983 SEA Games
4	5 June 1983	Singapore	Brunei		5–0	1983 SEA Games
5	19 September 1983	Kota Bharu, Malaysia	Nepal		7–0	1983 Pestabola Merdeka
6	19 September 1983	Kota Bharu, Malaysia	Nepal		7–0	1983 Pestabola Merdeka
7	19 September 1983	Kota Bharu, Malaysia	Nepal		7–0	1983 Pestabola Merdeka
8	10 October 1983	Kuala Lumpur, Malaysia	Saudi Arabia		3–1	1984 Olympic Games qualification
9	10 October 1983	Kuala Lumpur, Malaysia	Saudi Arabia		3–1	1984 Olympic Games qualification
10	16 October 1983	Singapore	Indonesia		1–1	1984 Olympic Games qualification
11	20 October 1983	Singapore	Singapore		2–0	1984 Olympic Games qualification
12	28 October 1983	Kuala Lumpur, Malaysia	Indonesia		2–0	1984 Olympic Games qualification
13	18 April 1984	Singapore	Japan		2–1	1984 Olympic Games qualification
14	12 August 1984	Kuala Lumpur, Malaysia	Singapore		1–0	Ovaltine Cup
15	18 August 1984	Singapore	Singapore		1–1	Ovaltine Cup
16	24 August 1984	Kuala Lumpur, Malaysia	Thailand		1–0	1984 Pestabola Merdeka
17	26 August 1984	Kuala Lumpur, Malaysia	Indonesia		2–2	1984 Pestabola Merdeka
18	29 August 1984	Kota Bharu, Malaysia	Liberia		3–1	1984 Pestabola Merdeka
19	29 August 1984	Kota Bharu, Malaysia	Liberia		3–1	1984 Pestabola Merdeka
20	29 August 1984	Kota Bharu, Malaysia	Liberia		3–1	1984 Pestabola Merdeka
21	4 September 1984	Kuala Lumpur, Malaysia	Papua New Guinea		5–1	1984 Pestabola Merdeka
22	11 October 1984	Calcutta, India	Pakistan		5–0	1984 AFC Asian Cup qualification
23	11 October 1984	Calcutta, India	Pakistan		5–0	1984 AFC Asian Cup qualification
24	14 October 1984	Calcutta, India	India		1–2	1984 AFC Asian Cup qualification
25	18 October 1984	Calcutta, India	North Yemen		4–1	1984 AFC Asian Cup qualification
26	18 October 1984	Calcutta, India	North Yemen		4–1	1984 AFC Asian Cup qualification
27	31 March 1985	Kuala Lumpur, Malaysia	Nepal		5–0	1986 FIFA World Cup qualification
28	31 March 1985	Kuala Lumpur, Malaysia	Nepal		5–0	1986 FIFA World Cup qualification
29	31 March 1985	Kuala Lumpur, Malaysia	Nepal		5–0	1986 FIFA World Cup qualification
30	13 October 1985	Singapore	Brunei		4–0	1985 Merlion Cup
31	10 December 1985	Bangkok, Thailand	Philippines		6–0	1985 SEA Games
32	10 December 1985	Bangkok, Thailand	Philippines		6–0	1985 SEA Games
33	14 December 1985	Bangkok, Thailand	Singapore		2–2	1985 SEA Games
34	24 July 1986	Kuala Lumpur, Malaysia	India		3–0	1986 Pestabola Merdeka
35	24 July 1986	Kuala Lumpur, Malaysia	India		3–0	1986 Pestabola Merdeka
36	27 July 1986	Kuala Lumpur, Malaysia	Thailand		2–0	1986 Pestabola Merdeka
37	1 August 1986	Kuala Lumpur, Malaysia	Japan		2–1	1986 Pestabola Merdeka
38	7 April 1988	Kuala Lumpur, Malaysia	Pakistan		4–0	1988 AFC Asian Cup qualification
39	7 April 1988	Kuala Lumpur, Malaysia	Pakistan		4–0	1988 AFC Asian Cup qualification
40	7 June 1989	Singapore	Nepal		3–0	1990 FIFA World Cup qualification
41	28 August 1989	Kuala Lumpur, Malaysia	Thailand		1–0	1989 SEA Games
42	8 August 1992	Jakarta, Indonesia	Indonesia		1–1	1992 Independence Cup
43	5 May 1993	Kuala Lumpur, Malaysia	Macau		9–0	1994 FIFA World Cup qualification
44	5 June 1993	Singapore	Brunei		3–1	1993 SEA Games
45	11 June 1993	Singapore	Laos		9–0	1993 SEA Games
46	10 December 1995	Lamphun, Thailand	Cambodia		9–0	1995 SEA Games
47	6 June 1996	Shah Alam, Malaysia	India		5–2	1996 AFC Asian Cup qualification
48	6 June 1996	Shah Alam, Malaysia	India		5–2	1996 AFC Asian Cup qualification
49	8 September 1996	Singapore	Thailand		1–1	1996 AFF Championship
50	31 March 1997	Jeddah, Saudi Arabia	Bangladesh		1–0	1998 FIFA World Cup qualification

== Honours ==
=== As a player ===
Selangor FA

- Malaysia Super League: 1989, 1990
- Malaysia Premier League runner-up: 1999
- Malaysia Cup: 1981, 1982, 1986, 1997; runner-up 1980
- Malaysia FA Cup: 1991, 1997; runner-up 1990
- Malaysia President Cup (as Selangor Youth Team): 1988; runner-up 1987, 1999
- Malaysia Charity Shield: 1985, 1987, 1990, 1997; runner-up 1998

Pahang FA

- Malaysia Super League: 1992, 1995
- Malaysia Cup: 1983, 1992
- Malaysia Charity Shield: 1992, 1993

Malaysia

- Pestabola Merdeka: 1986,1993
- SEA Games: (gold) gold 1989 ; (silver) Silver 1981 ; (bronze) bronze 1983 ; 1985
- Indonesian Independence Cup: 1992
- Tiger Cup: 1996 runner-up

Individual

- AFC Asian All Stars: 1982, 1985
- Pestabola Merdeka Top Scorer : 1986
- Malaysian League Golden Boot: 1983, 1986, 1989, 1992
- AFF Championship Most Valuable Player : 1996
- AFC Century Club Awards: 1999

=== As a head coach ===
Pahang FA

- Malaysia FA Cup: 2006, 2014
- Malaysia Cup: 2014
- Malaysia Charity Shield: 2014

Selangor FA

- Malaysia Charity Shield runner-up: 2016

Individual

- FAM Football Awards – Best Coach Award: 2014

== Filmography ==
=== Film ===
Year	Title	Role
1989	Kolej 56	Footballer

=== Television series ===
Year	Title	Role	TV channel	Notes
2000	Pi Mai Pi Mai Tang Tu (Season 29)	Himself	TV3	

== See also ==
- List of men's footballers with 100 or more international caps
- List of men's footballers with 50 or more international goals
- Depeche Mode
