= Atanu Bhattacharya =

Indian footballer and coach

Personal information
- Place of birth: India
- Position: Goalkeeper

Senior career*
Years	Team	Apps	(Gls)
- Mohammedan SC
- East Bengal
- Mohun Bagan

International career
- India
- * Club domestic league appearances and goals

Atanu Bhattacharya is an Indian former footballer, Asian All Star Goalkeeper and captain of the India national team. He has played for India in the 1984 Asian Cup alongside many other tournaments. During his playing career, he has represented all the three giants - East Bengal, Mohun Bagan and Mohammedan Sporting Club (Kolkata) for 4 years each. He has played for the India national team for over 12 years. He has also captained the National team in the 1986 Nehru Gold Cup. He is remembered for his immense contribution to the India national team and also for his selection into the Asian All Star team. He is one of those footballers who has played for all the three clubs. A fun fact being that he first played for India and then got a call for the Bengal team that later won the Santosh Trophy. He was only at BNR when he got selected for the India national team unlike most who were playing at big clubs. His performance in the game against Argentina in the year 1984 is highly recognised.He worked as deputy general manager and joint director–food in Food Corporation of India.

His biggest achievement is his selection in the 1986 Asian All Star team for his stellar performance under the sticks in the 1984 AFC ASIA CUP Qualifiers and Group stage of the tournament where his heroics and exceptional goalkeeping earned him the spot.

In the Asian All Star match held in Doha, Qatar, the ASIA 11 team played two matches against the Hungary National team which were preparing for the historic FIFA World Cup of 1986 which the same Argentina team (except Maradona) that faced India in the Nehru cup of 1984 won. Atanu was highly praised for his outstanding performance against the Hungary national team in the second match.

== Early life ==
Atanu was born in a family of sportsmen in Dhakuria, Kolkata. His father was a well known sports personality in Kolkata Maidan back in the 60s representing Aryan club. He graduated from South City College.

== The Beginning ==
Atanu started his Maidaan career with Howrah Union 1978-79. Due to a lack of playing time in the club, he decided to move to Salkia friends the next season 1979-80. He showed his mettle in the matches that season with outstanding performances in his early games. Ever since playing district, he was a follower of Pratap Ghosh, his idol. Similar to how Pratap entered the limelight after representing railways, Atanu took the same route. He joined BN Railways for 2 consecutive seasons 1980-82. The All India Railways team had gone for an invitational tournament in Nigeria. The team won all 6 matches beating the team Mighty Jet, a top level club in Nigeria, in the final, where Atanu saved 2 penalties in regulation time. He received an offer to join there, but he denied. As soon as he returned from the tour, he was called up for the Indian team camp. This was the beginning of this memorable journey.

== International Representation ==
As an Indian team player, he had the honour of representing the country in multiple tournaments. Here below are a list of tournaments that he was a prominent figure for the Blue Tigers.

1. Asian All Star (1986) held @ Qatar - Represented the country at a global platform, being the only Indian after Jarnail Singh (footballer), Peter Thangaraj, and Yousuf Khan (footballer)

2. Nehru Cup (1982–87) held @ India

3. Great Wall Cup (1984) held @ China

4. Pre-Olympic (1983) held @ Indonesia, Malaysia, Saudi Arabia, Singapore & India.

5. Asian Games (1982) held @ India

6. Pre World Cup (1985) held @ Indonesia, Bangladesh, Thailand, Malaysia

7. Asia Cup (1984) in Singapore

8. SAFF Games (1985) - held @ Bangladesh

9. Asian Games (1986) - held @ South Korea

10. Supper Soccer Tournament (1983–86) held @ India.

11. President's Gold Cup Tournament (1983) held @ Bangladesh.

12. Merdeka Cup (1981 & 86) - held @ Malaysia

Having over 50 caps for the country with 10 clean sheets, his record speaks volumes of his contribution to Indian football. Some of his best performances were against the best teams in the world - Argentina national football team, Morocco National Football team, South Korea, PSV, Sao Paolo FC, Bokum, Russia, Poland, Hungary, China, Iran, Saudi Arabia.

== Coaching career ==
His contributions don't just end at the national team as a player. He was selected as the Goalkeeper coach for over 3 seasons at Mohun Bagan, in the late 1990s and early 2000's where they won the National Football league and the IFA Shield.

He was also selected as the GK coach of the Indian team alongside Syed Nayeemuddin in 2005-06.They won the SAFF Gold Cup held in Karachi.

From the year 2009 to 2013 he was again selected as the Goalkeeper coach of East Bengal where he helped the club win 9 trophies in just 4 seasons.Federation Cup (3), CFL (2), Indian Super Cup (1), Platinum Jubilee Cup (1), IFA Shield (1)

Alongside his accolades as a player, he is also regarded as one of the finest goalkeeper coach in the country.

== Honours ==
Individual

- AFC Asian All Stars: 1985
- Shaan-e-Mohammedan : 2025
- Banglar Gourav : 2015-16

TEAM

- SAFF Games Gold in 1985
- Federation Cup winner in 1982, 1983 & 1984
- Durand Cup 3 time winner
- Sikkim Gold Cup 1 time winner
- Nizam Gold Cup 1 time winner
- Calcutta Football League 1 time winner
- Rovers Cup 3 time winner
- IFA Shield 2 time winner
- Bordoloi Cup 1 time winner
- Santosh Trophy 1 time winner
- Peerless Trophy 1 time winner
- Nagzi Gold Cup 1 time winner
- DCM 1 time winner

== See also ==
- List of India national football team captains
