= 2019 AFC Annual Awards =

Award ceremony presented for achievement in football in 2019

- Date: 2 December 2019
- Location: Hong Kong
- Presented by: Asian Football Confederation

Highlights
- AFC Player of the Year: Men's: (Qatar) Akram Afif; Women's: (Japan) Saki Kumagai
- AFC Coach of the Year: Men's: (South Korea) Chung Jung-yong; Women's: (Japan) Asako Takakura
- AFC Youth Player of the Year: Men's: (South Korea) Lee Kang-in; Women's: (Japan) Jun Endō
- AFC International Player of the Year: (South Korea) Son Heung-min
- AFC Futsal Player of the Year: (Japan) Tomoki Yoshikawa
- Website: www.the-afc.com

The 2019 AFC Annual Awards were the awards for football players and coaches of the year in Asia. The award ceremony was held in Hong Kong on 2 December 2019.

== Winners ==
The nominees were announced on 15 November 2019.

=== Men ===
==== Asian Footballer of the Year ====
Rank	Player	National team	Club	Ref.
1st	Akram Afif	Qatar	(Qatar) Al Sadd	
	Alireza Beiranvand	Iran	(Iran) Persepolis	
	Tomoaki Makino	Japan	(Japan) Urawa Red Diamonds	

==== International players ====
Rank	Player	National team	Club	Ref.
1st	Son Heung-min	South Korea	(England) Tottenham Hotspur	
	Sardar Azmoun	Iran	(Russia) Zenit Saint Petersburg	
	Makoto Hasebe	Japan	(Germany) Eintracht Frankfurt	

==== Coach of the Year ====
Rank	Coach	Team	Ref.
1st	(South Korea) Chung Jung-yong	South Korea U20	
	(Japan) Tsuyoshi Otsuki	(Japan) Urawa Red Diamonds	
	(Japan) Go Oiwa	(Japan) Kashima Antlers	

==== Futsal Player ====
Rank	Player	National team	Club	Ref.
1st	Tomoki Yoshikawa	Japan	(Japan) Nagoya Oceans	
	Mahdi Javid	Iran	(Iran) Mes Sungun	
	Yushi Sekiguchi	Japan	(Japan) Nagoya Oceans	

==== Young Player ====
Rank	Player	National team	Club	Ref.
1st	Lee Kang-in	South Korea	(Spain) Valencia	
	Hiroki Abe	Japan	(Spain) Barcelona B	
	Ghassan Al-Habahbeh	Jordan	(Jordan) Al-Ahli SC (Amman)	

=== Women ===
==== Asian Footballer of the Year ====
Rank	Player	National team	Club	Ref.
1st	Saki Kumagai	Japan	(France) Lyon	
	Loitongbam Ashalata Devi	India	(India) Sethu FC	
	Li Ying	China	(China) Guangdong Huijun	

==== Coach of the Year ====
Rank	Coach	Team	Ref.
1st	(Japan) Asako Takakura	Japan	
	(Iran) Katayoun Khosrowyar	Iran U20	
	(Thailand) Nuengrutai Srathongvian	(Thailand) Ratchaburi Mitr Phol	

==== Young Player ====
Rank	Player	National team	Club	Ref.
1st	Jun Endo	Japan	(Japan) Nippon TV Beleza	
	Karly Roestbakken	Australia	(Australia) Canberra United	
	Wang Linlin	China	N/A	

=== Other Awards ===
==== AFC Member Association of the Year (Inspiring) ====
Rank	Nationality	Ref.
1st	Japan	
	Iran	
	South Korea	

==== AFC Member Association of the Year (Developing) ====
Rank	Nationality	Ref.
1st	Hong Kong	
	North Korea	
	Singapore	

==== AFC Member Association of the Year (Aspiring) ====
Rank	Nationality	Ref.
1st	Guam	
	Mongolia	
	Yemen	

==== AFC President Recognition Awards for Grassroots Football (Inspiring) ====
Rank	Nationality	Ref.
1st	China	
	Japan	
	Malaysia	

==== AFC President Recognition Awards for Grassroots Football (Developing) ====
Rank	Nationality	Ref.
1st	Singapore	
	Hong Kong	
	India	

==== AFC President Recognition Awards for Grassroots Football (Aspiring) ====
Rank	Nationality	Ref.
1st	Brunei	
	Guam	
	Palestine	

== See also ==
- Asian Footballer of the Year
- Asian Young Footballer of the Year
