= Abd Mohd Khalid Mohd Ali =

Malaysian footballer (1957–2024)

Personal information
- Full name: Abd Mohd Khalid Bin Mohd Ali
- Date of birth: 1 May 1957
- Place of birth: Ampang, Federation of Malaya
- Date of death: 6 February 2024 (aged 66)
- Place of death: University of Malaya Medical Centre
- Height: 1.73 m (5 ft 8 in)
- Positions: Right back; defensive midfielder

Senior career*
Years	Team	Apps	(Gls)
1976–1980	Selangor FA		
1981–1982	Kuala Lumpur FA		
1983–1985	Selangor FA		

International career
1976–1983	Malaysia		(8)
- * Club domestic league appearances and goals

Abd Mohd Khalid Mohd Ali (Jawi: عبد محمد خالد بن محمد علي, IPA: [abdul mohd khalɪd bɪn mohd alɪ]; 1 May 1957 – 6 February 2024), better known as Khalid Ali, was a Malaysian footballer who played for Selangor FA and Kuala Lumpur as a right back and defensive midfielder in the late 1970s and in the 1980s. He was also a football critic.

== International career ==
Khalid Ali played for Malaysia from 1976 to 1983. He made his debut in the 1976 President's Cup in Korea. He was brought into the senior team by Karl-Heinz Weigang. He was a key player to the Malaysian team who qualified to the 1980 Olympic games Moscow which Malaysia boycotted. He also scored a hat-trick in a 6–1 win against Indonesia in the qualifying round for the 1980 Olympics. Malaysia won the play-off against South Korea with a 2–1 score in the Merdeka Stadium. He made his last appearances for Malaysia at the 1983 Southeast Asian Games.

== Personal life ==
His younger brother, Zainal Abidin Hassan, also played football professionally, winning six Malaysia Cups and four league titles with Selangor and Pahang.

Khalid Ali died from lung cancer on 6 February 2024, at the age of 66.

== Honours ==
Selangor FA

- First Division: 1984
- Malaysia Cup: 1976, 1978, 1979, 1984
- Charity Cup (Sultan Haji Ahmad Shah Cup): 1985

Malaysia

- SEA Games: Silver (1981), Bronze (1983)
- King's Cup: Champion (1976)

Individual

- AFC Asian All Stars: 1982
