= Kim Hye-ri (footballer) =

South Korean footballer (born 1990)

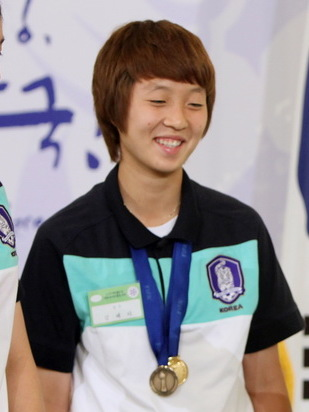
- Kim Hye-ri in 2010

Personal information
- Date of birth: 25 June 1990 (age 36)
- Place of birth: South Korea
- Height: 1.65 m (5 ft 5 in)
- Position: Defender

Team information
- Current team: Suwon FC
- Number: 20

Senior career*
Years	Team	Apps	(Gls)
2011–2013	Seoul WFC		
2014–2024	Hyundai Steel Red Angels		
2025	Wuhan Jiangda		
2026–	Suwon FC		

International career^{‡}
2008–2010	South Korea U20	18	(4)
2010–	South Korea	148	(3)
- * Club domestic league appearances and goals ‡ National team caps and goals as of 2 October 2026

Kim Hye-ri (Korean: 김혜리, Korean pronunciation: [kim.ɦje̞.ɾi] or [kim] [hje̞.ɾi]; born 25 June 1990) is a South Korean footballer who plays as a defender for Suwon FC and the South Korea women's national team.

== Youth career ==
At Oju Middle School, Kim trained in the girls' football academy alongside Ji So-yun. As the team dominated successive domestic U-15 tournaments, Kim and Ji were recognised as generational talents, with Kim sometimes referred to as the 'female Hong Myung-bo'. Having served as captain at Oju Middle School, Kim went on to play at Seoul Dongsan I.C.T. Industry High School and later at Yeoju Institute of Technology.

== Club career ==
=== WK League ===
Kim was selected by Seoul City Amazones WFC in the first round of the 2011 WK League draft. She made her league debut in the opening game of the 2011 season, establishing herself as a key part of Seoul's defensive line. After completing her three-year contract in the capital, Kim was signed by Incheon Hyundai Steel Red Angels ahead of the 2014 season as the club sought to defend their first league title. Kim played for Incheon from 2014 to 2024, lifting the WK League trophy for ten consecutive seasons. Kim's individual performances saw her named the league's best defender by the Korea Women's Football Federation in 2023 and 2024. She was also nominated for the Women's Player of the Year award at the 2023 AFC Annual Awards.

=== Wuhan Jiangda ===
After the end of the 2024 season, Kim announced her move to Chinese side Wuhan Jiangda, becoming the first South Korean woman to play in the Chinese Women's Super League. Shortly after her arrival in Wuhan, the city hosted the final knockout stages of the inaugural season of the AFC Women's Champions League. Kim was a key member of Jiangda's squad, playing all 120 minutes of the final against Melbourne City, which finished as a draw. Wuhan Jiangda won the penalty shoot-out that followed to win the tournament, making Kim the first South Korean woman to lift the AWCL trophy. The victory earned Wuhan qualification for the 2026 FIFA Women's Champions Cup, the inaugural edition of the competition. Wuhan became the first ever team to win a match at the FIFA Women's Champions Cup when they beat Auckland United FC, with Kim providing an assist for the only goal of the match.

== International career ==
=== South Korea U-20 ===
Kim was captain of the South Korean squad that came in third place at the 2010 FIFA U-20 Women's World Cup, becoming the first South Korean national team to finish third in a FIFA tournament. The achievement was considered a milestone in the country's football history and brought a flurry of media attention to the women's game in South Korea.

=== South Korea ===
Kim went on to represent her country at the Women's World Cup in 2015, 2019 and 2023. She became South Korea's captain in 2019, succeeding Cho So-hyun in the role as the squad underwent a period of reorganisation following the departure of former manager Yoon Deok-yeo.

When Kim made her 100th international appearance in a 2022 friendly match against Canada, the Canadian Soccer Association honoured her with a pre-match ceremony alongside three Canadian players marking the same milestone. Kim provided an assist against Chinese Taipei in South Korea's final match at the 2025 EAFF E-1 Football Championship, helping the team claim the title for the first time in 20 years.

== Honours ==
Incheon Hyundai Steel Red Angels

- WK League: 2014, 2015, 2016, 2017, 2018, 2019, 2020, 2021, 2022, 2023

Wuhan Jiangda

- AFC Women's Champions League: 2024–25

South Korea U-20

- FIFA U-20 Women's World Cup third place: 2010

South Korea

- Asian Games third place: 2010, 2014, 2018, 2026
- AFC Women's Asian Cup runners up: 2022
- EAFF E-1 Football Championship: 2025

Individual

- Korea Women's Football Federation Awards Defender of the year: 2023, 2024
- KPFA WK League Awards Best XI: 2024
