= Aswin Thong-innet =

Thai footballer (1937–1965)

Personal information
- Full name: Aswin Thong-innet
- Date of birth: 28 January 1937
- Place of birth: Pathum Thani, Siam
- Date of death: 26 November 1965 (aged 28)
- Place of death: Bangkok, Thailand
- Height: 1.80 m (5 ft 11 in)
- Position: Goalkeeper

Senior career*
| Years | Team | Apps | (Gls) |
| 1962–1965 | Bangkok Bank | ? | (0) |

International career
| 1962–1965 | Thailand | ? | (0) |
- * Club domestic league appearances and goals

Aswin Thong-innet, also spelled Asvin Thonginnetr (Thai: อัศวิน ธงอินเนตร (Note: also spelled "ธงอินทรเนตร" RTGS: Thong-innet); 28 January 1937 – 26 November 1965), known by the footballing nickname as The Flying King or Jom Hern Hao (Thai: จอมเหินหาว (Note: Formerly spelled in Thai as "จอมเหิรหาว".); RTGS: Chom Hoen Hao), was a Thai footballer who played as a goalkeeper for Thailand national team.

== Early life ==
Aswin Thong-innet was born in 28 January 1937, in Pathum Thani province. He was the second son of his father Pisit and his mother Bang-orn Thong-innet.

His younger brother, Artorn (Thai: อาธร ธงอินเนตร) who was also a footballer played for Bangkok Bank.

== Career ==
Aswin originally as an athlete, he converted to football and represent Thammasat University team. As Viwat Milintajinda, a former Thai footballer and Thammasat University team coach (1959-1965) has said to Aswin before he become a footballer, "If Aswin not going to play football in that era, He will be remain an athlete."

In 1962, Aswin joined Bangkok Bank F.C., where his performance quickly earned him a place in the Thailand national team.

In 1965, him and the Thailand national team players touring to Europe, playing against clubs and representative sides in West Germany and Norway.

Following the 1965 Merdeka Tournament in Malaysia, the AFC selected him as the goalkeeper of the Asian All-Stars, making him the first Thai footballer to receive an Asian All-Star selection.

== Death ==
On November 26, 1965, Aswin died after a collision with Bangkok Bank F.C. player during the practice match in Bang Na Stadium in Bangkok, a home ground of Bangkok Bank. He suffered fatal injuries from the on-field accident and passed away at just 28 years old.

In November 28, 1965 two days after his death, Thairath published with their headline "A huge sad news for Thai football, Thai player [Aswin] has left out of the Asian All-stars"
