= 2022 AFC Annual Awards =

Award ceremony presented for achievement in football in 2022

- Date: 31 October 2023
- Location: Doha, Qatar
- Presented by: Asian Football Confederation
- Hosted by: John Dykes; Seema Jaswal

Highlights
- AFC Player of the Year: Men's: (Saudi Arabia) Salem Al-Dawsari; Women's: (Australia) Samantha Kerr
- AFC Coach of the Year: Men's: (Japan) Hajime Moriyasu; Women's: (China) Shui Qingxia
- AFC Youth Player of the Year: Men's: (Japan) Kuryu Matsuki; Women's: (Japan) Maika Hamano
- AFC International Player of the Year: (South Korea) Kim Min-jae
- AFC Futsal Player of the Year: (Iran) Moslem Oladghobad
- Website: www.the-afc.com

The 2022 AFC Annual Awards was the 27th edition of the AFC Annual Awards; an awards ceremony for football players, coaches, members and other practitioners of the year in Asia. The award ceremony was held at the Al Mayassa Theatre, part of the Qatar National Convention Centre in Doha, Qatar on 31 October 2023.

The awards were held for the first time since 2019 as the ceremonies were cancelled chiefly due to the COVID-19.

== Winners ==
The nominees were announced on 13 October 2023.

=== Men ===
==== Player of the Year ====
Rank	Player	National team	Club	Ref.
1st	Salem Al-Dawsari	Saudi Arabia	(Saudi Arabia) Al Hilal	
	Almoez Ali	Qatar	(Qatar) Al-Duhail	
	Mathew Leckie	Australia	(Australia) Melbourne City FC	

==== Asian International Player of the Year ====
Rank	Player	National team	Club	Ref.
1st	Kim Min-jae	South Korea	(Turkey) Fenerbahçe (Italy) Napoli	
	Mehdi Taremi	Iran	(Portugal) Porto	
	Kaoru Mitoma	Japan	(Belgium) Union Saint-Gilloise (England) Brighton & Hove Albion	

==== Coach of the Year ====
Rank	Player	National team	Ref.
1st	Hajime Moriyasu	Japan	
	Graham Arnold	Australia	
	Saad Al-Shehri	Saudi Arabia U23	

==== Futsal Player of the Year ====
Rank	Player	National team	Ref.
1st	Moslem Oladghobad	Iran	
	Saeid Ahmadabbasi	Iran	
	Guilherme Kuromoto	Japan	

==== Youth Player of the Year ====
Rank	Player	National team	Club	Ref.
1st	Kuryu Matsuki	Japan	(Japan) FC Tokyo	
	Amin Hazbavi	Iran	(Iran) Foolad	
	Lee Seung-won	South Korea	(South Korea) Dankook University	

=== Women ===
==== Player of the Year ====
Rank	Player	National team	Club	Ref.
1st	Samantha Kerr	Australia	(England) Chelsea	
	Zhang Linyan	China	(China) Wuhan Jianghan University; (England) Tottenham Hotspur	
	Saki Kumagai	Japan	(Germany) Bayern Munich	

==== Coach of the Year ====
Rank	Player	National team	Ref.
1st	Shui Qingxia	China	
	Tomomi Miyamoto	Japan	
	Kim Eun-jung	South Korea	

==== Youth Player of the Year ====
Rank	Player	National team	Club	Ref.
1st	Maika Hamano	Japan	(Japan) INAC Kobe; (England) Chelsea	
	Mary Fowler	Australia	(England) Manchester City	
	Huo Yuexin	China	(China) Jiangsu Youth	

=== Referees ===
==== AFC Referees Special Award ====
	Name	Association	Ref.
Referee	Chris Beath	Australia	
Assistant Referee	Ashley Beecham	Australia	
Assistant Referee	Anton Schetinin	Australia	
Support video assistant Referee	Ammar Al-Jneibi	United Arab Emirates	

=== Other awards ===
==== AFC Member Association of the Year (Platinum) ====
Rank	National association	Ref.
1st	Uzbekistan	
	Iran	
	Japan	

==== AFC Member Association of the Year (Diamond) ====
Rank	National association	Ref.
1st	Lebanon	
	Kyrgyzstan	
	Vietnam	

==== AFC Member Association of the Year (Gold) ====
Rank	National association	Ref.
1st	Hong Kong	
	Kuwait	
	Nepal	

==== AFC Member Association of the Year (Ruby) ====
Rank	National association	Ref.
1st	Guam	

==== AFC Regional Association of the Year ====
Rank	National association	Ref.
1st	CAFA	
	ASEAN	
	SAFF	

==== AFC President Recognition Awards for Grassroots Football (Gold) ====
Rank	National association	Ref.
1st	Australia	
	China	
	Japan	

==== AFC President Recognition Awards for Grassroots Football (Silver) ====
Rank	National association	Ref.
1st	Guam	
	Philippines	
	Thailand	

==== AFC President Recognition Awards for Grassroots Football (Bronze) ====
Rank	National association	Ref.
1st	India	
	Brunei	
	Iran	
	Syria	

==== AFC Diamond of Asia ====
Winner	Ref.
(Qatar) Saoud Al-Mohannadi †	
