= Mohannad Abdul-Raheem =

Iraqi footballer

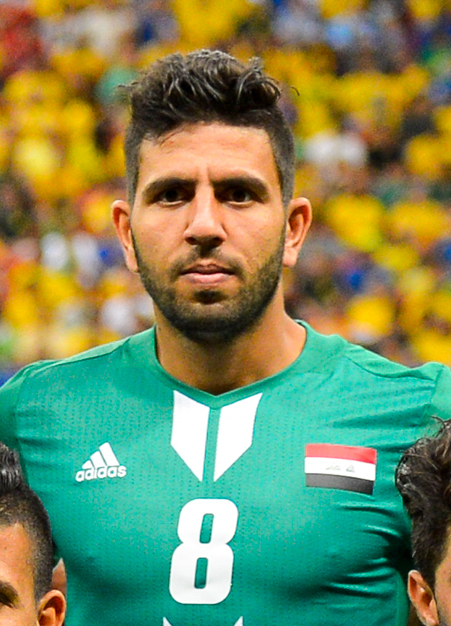
- Abdul-Raheem at the 2016 Summer Olympics

Personal information
- Full name: Mohannad Abdul-Raheem Karrar
- Date of birth: 22 September 1993 (age 33)
- Place of birth: Baghdad, Iraq
- Height: 1.84 m (6 ft 0 in)
- Position: Forward

Team information
- Current team: Al-Kahraba

Youth career
- 2008–2009: Al-Karkh

Senior career*
Years	Team	Apps	(Gls)
2009–2012	Al-Karkh		(16)
2012–2014	Duhok		(22)
2014–2015	JS Kabylie	12	(4)
2015–2016	Al-Zawraa	27	(14)
2016	Al-Nasr	10	(4)
2017	Al-Zawraa	14	(5)
2017	Al Dhafra	11	(3)
2018–2021	Al-Zawraa		(35)
2021–2022	Naft Al-Wasat		(12)
2022–2024	Al-Quwa Al-Jawiya		(21)
2024–2026	Al-Minaa		(12)
2026–	Al-Kahraba		

International career^{‡}
2011–2013	Iraq U20	15	(9)
2011–2016	Iraq U23	18	(3)
2012–2022	Iraq	50	(11)
- * Club domestic league appearances and goals as of 28 May 2026 ‡ National team caps and goals as of 25 July 2026

Mohannad Abdul-Raheem Karrar (Arabic: مُهَنَّد عَبْد الرَّحِيم كَرَّار; born 22 September 1993), is an Iraqi footballer who plays as a striker for Iraq Stars League club Al-Kahraba and the Iraq national team. An Olympian, Mohannad is the 2012 Asian Young Footballer of the Year, and the 2012 AFC U-19 Championship's MVP.

== Club career ==
=== Early career ===
From a young age, the childhood Al-Zawraa supporter and son of a tribal Sheikh would spend his free time on the concrete pitches in his local neighbourhood kicking a ball with friends. It was his late uncle Razzaq who encouraged him to take up the game and coached him with his first shaabiya teams at Najoum Al-Mualameen and Iskan Al-Shaabi, the two main football teams in his local area between Iskan and Mualameen where both sides wanted the talented youngster in their team.

Abdul-Raheem had trials with a local club Khutout under Ismail Saleem however he was overlooked and instead started in the Al-Karkh youth system and had a season at Al-Shabab in the second division after he returned from living in Syria to escape the instability of the Iraqi capital – after losing his uncle and brother Mohammed to the violence in Baghdad. His life changed when his late coach Nasrat Nassir at Baghdad's Al-Karkh SC switched him from playing as a wide forward to play upfront in the centre forward position while he was breaking into the Al-Karkh first team.

=== Al Karkh ===
Abdul-Raheem began his youth career at his native Al Karkh FC in 2006 and graduated to the first team in 2009. On his debut in the Iraqi league one playoff, Mohannad scored a hat trick and helped Al-Karkh qualify to the Iraqi Premier League. In 2012 Mohannad left Al-Karkh and joined Duhok SC.

=== Duhok ===
Three years following his competitive debut, Abdul-Raheem moved to Duhok where he spent two seasons from 2012 to 2014. There he showcased his abilities which led him to be an important part of Iraqi youth setups.

=== JS Kabylie ===
Mohannad signed for JS Kabylie in Algeria. He scored his first goal in the 87th minute of the league match against MC El Eulma, and scored his second a minute later. He ended the season with 4 goals in 12 appearances in the league. The team finished the 13th position, surviving relegation by just one point. The team was knocked out in the quarter-final of the cup competition, with a 2–1 loss against ES Sétif. He suffered an Injury and failed to adjust to life in Algeria due to the death of teammate Albert Ebossé Bodjongo. In an interview with Soccer Iraq, the player stated that he decided to cut his time short with the Algerian club due to the incident.

=== Al Zawraa ===
Abdul-Raheem returned to Iraq for the 2015/16 season with Al Zawraa, he was the standout player as he finished the season with 12 goals, being the joint top goal scorer, as well as winning the league with Al Zawraa. He also reached the final of the Iraqi cup with his team, losing to rivals Al Quwa Al Jawiya.

=== Al Nasr ===
On 19 October 2016, Abdulraheem signed for Al-Nasr Dubai as the Asian player. He was there to replace the suspended Wanderley but upon his return from suspension Al Nasr deemed Mohannad surplus to requirements and replaced him with Lebanese Joan Oumari who took the Asian foreign slot. Mohannad left the club after only playing 10 games, scoring 4 goals.

=== Return to Al Zawraa ===
Mohannad returned to Al Zawraa on 20 January 2017. He made his debut on 10 February Vs Al Quwa Al Jawiya, receiving a yellow card in the first half. He was fouled in the penalty box later on in the match but his penalty was saved by Fahad Talib, Al Quwa Al Jawiya scored 30 seconds after his penalty miss and the match ended 1–1. He scored his first goal after his return on 2 March against Al Talaba in a 2–1 win.

=== Al Dhafra ===
On 19 July 2017, Mohannad signed for Al-Dhafra in the UAE Pro-League. He made his debut on 8 September, scoring against Al Jazira in the UAE League Cup. He returned again to Al Zawraa in January 2018.

== International career ==
Mohannad Abdul-Raheem was called into the Iraq U-19s team becoming the main striker in Hakeem Shaker’s ‘young’ team, scoring a goal in the AFC Youth Championship final and going onto be awarded the 2012 Asian Young Footballer of the Year award.

There has been some controversy regarding the player's change of name from Mohanad Abdul-Rahman Kazar to Mohanad Abdul-Rahim Karrar in April 2011 just before he called into the Iraqi youth side, with claims that the player had altered his date of birth from 1989.

He was called by Iraq coach Hakeem Shaker to represent Iraq national team first team in the 21st Arabian Gulf Cup replacing Iraq super star Younis Mahmoud, but stating that he would like to play alongside Younis Mahmoud.

On 18 January 2013 he played alongside Younis Mahmoud in the Arabian Gulf Cup finale against UAE. Mohannad assisted the equalizer to Younis Mahmoud. however, the match ended 1–2 in the extra time for UAE. He scored his first and second goal for Iraq in a friendly match against Malaysia on 1 February 2013.

Mohannad was called up to Iraq's Olympic squad for the 2016 Olympic games in Rio de Janeiro, Brazil. Iraq finished third in their group behind hosts Brazil, and Denmark with 3 points from 3 draws and thus were eliminated at the group stage.

=== Iraq U-23 ===
#	Date	Venue	Opponent	Score	Result	Competition
1.	26 January 2014	Seeb Stadium, Seeb, Oman	Saudi Arabia	0–1	0–1	2013 AFC U-22 Championship
2.	23 January 2016	Grand Hamad Stadium, Doha, Qatar	United Arab Emirates	1–2 (a.e.t.)	1–3	2016 AFC U-23 Championship

=== National team goals ===
Scores and results list Iraq's goal tally first.

#	Date	Venue	Opponent	Score	Result	Competition
	1 February 2013	Rashid Stadium, Dubai	Malaysia	2–0	3–0	Friendly^{1}
	1 February 2013	Rashid Stadium, Dubai	Malaysia	3–0	3–0	Friendly^{1}
1.	21 February 2014	Zabeel Stadium, Dubai	North Korea	2–0	2–0	Friendly
2.	26 August 2015	Saida Municipal Stadium, Saida	Lebanon	1–0	3–2	Friendly
3.	29 March 2016	PAS Stadium, Tehran	Vietnam	1–0	1–0	2018 FIFA World Cup qualification
4.	21 August 2016	STAR Stadium, Kuala Lumpur	North Korea	1–1	1–1	Friendly
5.	6 September 2016	Shah Alam Stadium, Shah Alam	Saudi Arabia	1–0	1–2	2018 FIFA World Cup qualification
6.	11 October 2016	PAS Stadium, Tehran	Thailand	1–0	4–0	2018 FIFA World Cup qualification
7.	11 October 2016	PAS Stadium, Tehran	Thailand	2–0	4–0	2018 FIFA World Cup qualification
8.	11 October 2016	PAS Stadium, Tehran	Thailand	3–0	4–0	2018 FIFA World Cup qualification
9.	11 October 2016	PAS Stadium, Tehran	Thailand	4–0	4–0	2018 FIFA World Cup qualification
10.	23 December 2017	Al Kuwait Sports Club Stadium, Kuwait City	Bahrain	1–1	1–1	23rd Arabian Gulf Cup
11.	2 August 2019	Karbala Sports City, Karbala	Palestine	1–1	2–1	2019 WAFF Championship
1:Non FIFA 'A' international match

== Style of play ==
Abdulraheem is a physically strong and aggressive lone striker with good skills, tactical intelligence, and confidence in going at opponents with numerical superiority.

== Name change ==
There has been some controversy regarding the player's change of name from Mohanad Abdul-Rahman Kazar to Mohanad Abdul-Rahim Karrar in April 2011 just before he called into the Iraqi youth side, with claims that the player had altered his date of birth from 1989. In 2011 his name changed from Muhanned Abdulrahman to Mohannad Abdul-Raheem as noted by his page on Kooora's English website Goalzz.com.

== Honours ==
=== Club ===
Al-Zawraa

- Iraqi Premier League: 2015–16, 2017–18
- Iraq FA Cup: 2016–17, 2018–19

Al-Quwa Al-Jawiya

- Iraq FA Cup: 2022–23

=== International ===
Youth team

- 2012 AFC U-19 Championship: Runners-up
- 2013 FIFA U-20 World Cup: Fourth place
- 2013 AFC U-22 Championship: Winner

National team

- 21st Arabian Gulf Cup: Runners-up

=== Individual ===
- 2012 AFC U-19 Championship: MVP
- 2012 Asian Young Footballer of the Year: Winner
- 2015–16 Iraqi Premier League joint top-scorer (12 goals)
- 2022–23 Iraqi Premier League top-scorer (18 goals)
