= Maika Hamano =

Japanese footballer (born 2004)

Maika Hamano 浜野 まいか
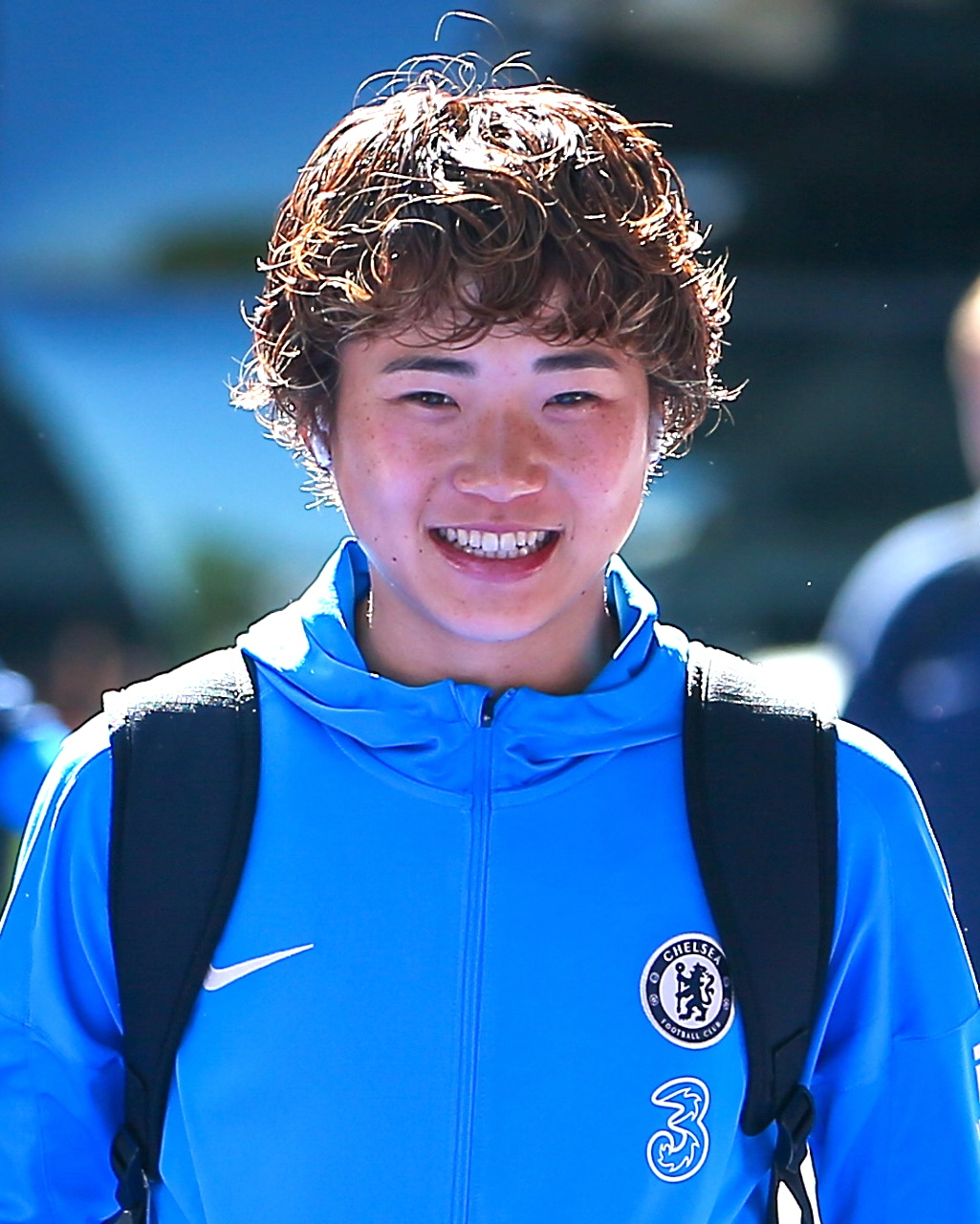
- Hamano in 2025

Personal information
- Date of birth: 9 May 2004 (age 22)
- Place of birth: Takaishi, Osaka, Japan
- Height: 1.65 m (5 ft 5 in)
- Position: Forward

Team information
- Current team: Chelsea
- Number: 23

Youth career
- FFC Selecao
- Cerezo Osaka Sakai Ladies

Senior career*
Years	Team	Apps	(Gls)
2018–2021	Cerezo Osaka Sakai Ladies	37	(14)
2021–2022	INAC Kobe Leonessa	20	(3)
2023–	Chelsea	34	(7)
2023	→ Hammarby IF (loan)	17	(7)
2026	→ Tottenham Hotspur (loan)	8	(1)

International career^{‡}
2022	Japan U20	6	(4)
2022–	Japan	36	(11)
- * Club domestic league appearances and goals as of 14 November 2026 ‡ National team caps and goals as of 13 October 2026

Maika Hamano (Japanese: 浜野 まいか, Hamano Maika, pronounced [ha̠ma̠no̞ ma̠i̥ka̠]; born 9 May 2004) is a Japanese professional footballer who plays as a forward for Women's Super League club Chelsea and the Japan national team.

== Club career ==
Hamano made her WE League debut for INAC Kobe Leonessa on 12 September 2021 in a 5–0 victory over Omiya Ardija Ventus.

On 13 January 2023, Hamano signed for Chelsea and was immediately loaned to Swedish side Hammarby IF. There, she made 17 league appearances and scored 7 goals during the 2023 Damallsvenskan season, before being recalled in September after sustaining a shoulder injury.

After recovering from injury, Hamano made her Women's Super League debut for Chelsea on 17 December 2023 in a 3–0 away win over Bristol City, replacing Lauren James in the second half.

On 4 January 2026, Hamano joined fellow Women's Super League side Tottenham Hotspur on loan for the remainder of the season.

== International career ==
In July 2022, Hamano was included in the Japan under-20 team for the 2022 U-20 World Cup, where they finished as runners-up after losing to Spain in the final. She won the Golden Ball as the tournament's best player, and the Silver Boot as the second-best goalscorer behind Inma Gabarro.

Hamano made her senior team debut on 6 October 2022, when she came on as a substitute for Mina Tanaka in the 69th minute of a 2–0 friendly win over Nigeria. On 13 June 2023, she was included in Japan's 23-player squad for the 2023 World Cup.

In June 2024, Hamano was included in the Japan squad for the 2024 Summer Olympics.

Hamano was part of the Japan squad that won the 2025 SheBelieves Cup. A year later, she won the 2026 AFC Women's Asian Cup with Japan, the country's third continental title and first since 2018, scoring the only goal of the match in a 1–0 final victory over Australia.

== Career statistics ==
=== Club ===
As of match played 18 November 2026

Appearances and goals by club, season and competition
Club	Season	League			National cup (Note: Includes Empress's Cup, Svenska Cupen, Women's FA Cup)		League cup (Note: Includes Nadeshiko League Cup, WE League Cup, Women's League Cup)		Continental (Note: Includes UEFA Women's Champions League)		Total	
Club	Season	Division	Apps	Goals	Apps	Goals	Apps	Goals	Apps	Goals	Apps	Goals
Cerezo Osaka Sakai	2018	Nadeshiko League	1	0	0	0	0	0	—		1	0
Cerezo Osaka Sakai	2019	Nadeshiko League 2	4	3	2	0	4	1	—		10	4
Cerezo Osaka Sakai	2020	Nadeshiko League	18	6	3	2	—		—		21	8
Cerezo Osaka Sakai	2021	Nadeshiko League	14	5	—		—		—		14	5
Cerezo Osaka Sakai	Total		37	14	5	2	4	1	—		46	17
INAC Kobe Leonessa	2021–22	WE League	16	2	1	1	—		—		17	3
INAC Kobe Leonessa	2022–23	WE League	4	1	1	1	2	0	—		7	2
INAC Kobe Leonessa	Total		20	3	2	2	2	0	—		24	5
Chelsea	2022–23	Women's Super League	0	0	0	0	0	0	0	0	0	0
Chelsea	2023–24	Women's Super League	6	2	1	0	1	0	0	0	8	2
Chelsea	2024–25	Women's Super League	17	2	3	1	3	1	7	2	30	6
Chelsea	2025–26	Women's Super League	4	1	0	0	1	0	3	1	8	2
Chelsea	2026–27	Women's Super League	7	2	0	0	—		6	0	13	2
Chelsea	Total		34	7	4	1	5	1	16	3	59	12
Hammarby IF (loan)	2023	Damallsvenskan	17	7	5	4	—		—		22	11
Tottenham Hotspur (loan)	2025–26	Women's Super League	8	1	2	0	—		—		10	1
Career total			116	32	18	9	11	2	16	3	161	46

=== International ===
As of match played 13 October 2026

Appearances and goals by national team and year
National team	Year	Apps	Goals
Japan	2022	1	0
Japan	2023	5	0
Japan	2024	10	4
Japan	2025	10	2
Japan	2026	10	5
Total		36	11

Scores and results list Japan's goal tally first, score column indicates score after each Hamano goal.

List of international goals scored by Maika Hamano
No.	Date	Venue	Opponent	Score	Result	Competition
1	3 June 2024	Estadio Nueva Condomina, Murcia, Spain	New Zealand	1–1	4–1	Friendly
2	3 June 2024	Estadio Nueva Condomina, Murcia, Spain	New Zealand	2–1	4–1	Friendly
3	13 July 2024	Kanazawa Stadium, Kanazawa, Ishikawa, Japan	Ghana	2–0	4–0	MS&AD Cup
4	31 July 2024	Stade de la Beaujoire, Nantes, France	Nigeria	1–0	3–1	2024 Summer Olympics
5	20 February 2025	Shell Energy Stadium, Houston, Texas, United States	Australia	3–0	4–0	2025 SheBelieves Cup
6	23 February 2025	State Farm Stadium, Glendale, Arizona, United States	Colombia	3–1	4–1	2025 SheBelieves Cup
7	10 March 2026	Perth Rectangular Stadium, Perth, Australia	Vietnam	2–0	4–0	2026 AFC Women's Asian Cup
8	18 March 2026	Stadium Australia, Sydney, Australia	South Korea	2–0	4–1	2026 AFC Women's Asian Cup
9	21 March 2026	Stadium Australia, Sydney, Australia	Australia	1–0	1–0	2026 AFC Women's Asian Cup
10	15 April 2026	Lumen Field, Seattle, Washington, United States	United States	1–0	1–0	Friendly
11	9 October 2026	Stade Bauer, Saint-Ouen-sur-Seine, France	Haiti	2–0	5–1	Friendly

== Honours ==
INAC Kobe Leonessa

- WE League: 2021–22

Hammarby IF

- Swedish Cup: 2022–23

Chelsea

- Women's Super League: 2023–24, 2024–25
- Women's FA Cup: 2024–25
- Women's League Cup: 2024–25

Japan U16

- AFC U-16 Women's Championship: 2019

Japan

- AFC Women's Asian Cup: 2026
- SheBelieves Cup: 2025

Individual

- AFC U-16 Women's Championship top scorer: 2019
- FIFA U-20 Women's World Cup Golden Ball: 2022
- AFC Asian International Player of the Year: 2025
- AFC Youth Player of the Year: 2022
- FIFPRO Asia/Oceania Team of the Tournament: Australia 2026
