= 2023 AFC Annual Awards =

Award ceremony presented for achievement in football in 2023

- Date: 29 October 2024
- Location: Seoul, South Korea
- Presented by: Asian Football Confederation
- Hosted by: Michelle Lee; Jae-Min Park

Highlights
- AFC Player of the Year: Men's: (Qatar) Akram Afif; Women's: (Japan) Seike Kiko
- AFC Coach of the Year: Men's: (Japan) Gō Ōiwa; Women's: (South Korea) Park Youn-jeong
- AFC Youth Player of the Year: Men's: (Uzbekistan) Abbosbek Fayzullaev; Women's: (North Korea) Chae Un-Yong
- AFC International Player of the Year: Men's: (South Korea) Son Heung-min; Women's: (Australia) Ellie Carpenter
- AFC Futsal Player of the Year: (Iran) Saeid Ahmad Abbasi
- Website: www.the-afc.com

The 2023 AFC Annual Awards was the 28th edition of the AFC Annual Awards; an awards ceremony for football players, coaches, members and other practitioners of the year in Asia. The award ceremony was held at the Grand Peace Palace, part of Kyung Hee University campus in Seoul, South Korea on 29 October 2024.

== Winners ==
=== Men ===
==== Player of the Year ====
Rank	Player	National team	Club	Ref.
1st	Akram Afif	Qatar	(Qatar) Al Sadd	
	Seol Young-woo	South Korea	(South Korea) Ulsan HD (Serbia) Crvena Zvezda	
	Yazan Al Naimat	Jordan	(Qatar) Al Ahli (Qatar) Al-Arabi	

==== Asian International Player of the Year ====
Rank	Player	National team	Club	Ref.
1st	Son Heung-min	South Korea	(England) Tottenham	
	Mehdi Taremi	Iran	(Portugal) Porto (Italy) Inter Milan	
	Mousa Al Tamari	Jordan	(France) Montpellier	

==== Coach of the Year ====
Rank	Player	National team	Ref.
1st	Gō Ōiwa	Japan U23	
	Graham Arnold	Australia	
	Hwang Sun-hong	South Korea U23	

==== Futsal Player of the Year ====
Rank	Player	National team	Ref.
1st	Saeid Ahmadabbasi	Iran	
	Fayzali Sardorov	Tajikistan	
	Dilshod Rakhmatov	Uzbekistan	

==== Youth Player of the Year ====
Rank	Player	National team	Club	Ref.
1st	Abbosbek Fayzullaev	Uzbekistan	(Russia) CSKA Moscow	
	Bae Jun-ho	South Korea	(South Korea) Daejeon Hana Citizen (England) Stoke City	
	Gaku Nawata	Japan U17	(Japan) Kamimura Gakuen High School	

=== Women ===
==== Player of the Year ====
Rank	Player	National team	Club	Ref.
1st	Kiko Seike	Japan	(South Korea) Urawa Reds (England) Brighton & Hove Albion	
	Cortnee Vine	Australia	(Australia) Sydney FC (United States) North Carolina Courage	
	Kim Hye-ri	South Korea	(South Korea) Incheon HD	

==== Asian International Player of the Year ====
Rank	Player	National team	Club	Ref.
1st	Ellie Carpenter	Australia	(France) Lyon	
	Yui Hasegawa	Japan	(England) Manchester City	

==== Coach of the Year ====
Rank	Player	National team	Ref.
1st	Park Youn-jeong	South Korea U20	
	Tomomi Miyamoto	Japan	
	Leah Blayney	Australia U20	

==== Youth Player of the Year ====
Rank	Player	National team	Club	Ref.
1st	Chae Un-yong	North Korea U20	(North Korea) Wolmido SC	
	Daniela Galic	Australia	(Australia) Melbourne City (Netherlands) Twente	
	Casey Phair	South Korea	(United States) Angel City	

=== Referees ===
==== AFC Referees Special Award ====
	Name	Association	Ref.
Referee	Yuichi Hatano	Japan	
Referee	Abdullah Al-Salehi	Oman	
Referee	Ibrahim Yousif Al Raeesi	United Arab Emirates	

=== Other awards ===
==== AFC Member Association of the Year (Platinum) ====
National association	Ref.
Japan	

==== AFC Member Association of the Year (Diamond) ====
National association	Ref.
Thailand	

==== AFC Member Association of the Year (Gold) ====
National association	Ref.
Nepal	

==== AFC Member Association of the Year (Ruby) ====
National association	Ref.
Laos	

==== AFC Regional Association of the Year ====
National association	Ref.
CAFA	

==== AFC President's Recognition Awards for Grassroots Football (Gold) ====
National association	Ref.
Australia	

==== AFC President's Recognition Awards for Grassroots Football (Silver) ====
National association	Ref.
India	

==== AFC President's Recognition Awards for Grassroots Football (Bronze) ====
National association	Ref.
Vietnam	

==== AFC President's Recognition Award for Outstanding Contribution ====
Winner	Ref.
Saudi Arabia	

==== AFC Asian Cup Host Appreciation Award ====
Winner	Ref.
Qatar	

==== AFC Diamond of Asia ====
Winner	Ref.
(Italy) Gianni Infantino	
