= Saoud Al-Mohannadi =

Vice president of Qatar Football Association and Asian Football Confederation

Saud Abdul Aziz Al Mohannadi

Vice President of the Qatar Football Association
- In office 2013–2023

Vice President of the Asian Football Confederation
- In office 2015–2023

Member of the FIFA Council
- In office 7 April 2019 – 10 January 2023

Personal details
- Born: 1 January 1957 Qatar
- Died: 10 January 2023 (aged 66) Doha, Qatar
- Occupation: Sports administrator, Fifa council member

Saoud Abdul Aziz M. Al Mohannadi (1 January 1957 – 10 January 2023), was the vice president of Qatar Football Association and vice president of the Asian Football Confederation. He was a member in the FIFA Council.

He was elected into the FIFA council during the Asia Football Confederation held in Lampur, Malaysia on 6 April 2019 for the sessions of 2019 to 2023 and was elected with a vote of 37 out of 46, along with three member of Asia Football to represent Asia in FIFA council.

== Career ==
Saoud since joining the AFC and QFA had been part of the committee organizing the AFC Asian Cup tournament during the 2011 Qatar tournament and 2015 Australian tournament. He had also served as secretary general of Qatar FA from 2001 to 2012.

Saoud died on 10 January 2023.
