= 2011 AFC Annual Awards =

- Date: 23 November 2011
- Location: Kuala Lumpur, Malaysia
- Presented by: Asian Football Confederation

Highlights
- AFC Player of the Year: Men's: (Uzbekistan) Server Djeparov; Women's: (Japan) Aya Miyama
- AFC Coach of the Year: Men's: (Japan) Norio Sasaki; Women's: (Japan) Takako Tezuka
- AFC Youth Player of the Year: Men's: (Japan) Hideki Ishige; Women's: (Australia) Caitlin Foord
- AFC Futsal Player of the Year: (Iran) Mohammad Keshavarz
- Website: www.the-afc.com

The 2011 AFC Annual Awards was the top football players and coaches of the year in Asia.

Among six candidates, Server Djeparov win the Asian Footballer of the Year award for the second time.

Aya Miyama, Japan women's football team player which won 2011 FIFA Women's World Cup was awarded Asian Women Footballer of the Year.

Hideki Ishige and Caitlin Foord becomes the Youth Player of the Year. Al-Sadd which won 2011 AFC Champions League was named as the Club of the Year. Both Japan's men and women's team was named as National Team of the Year.

Ravshan Irmatov and . Norio Sasaki was awarded as the Coach of the Year. Mohammad Keshavarz, MVP of the 2011 AFC Futsal Club Championship was awarded as Futsal Player of the Year. Nagoya Oceans, winner of the 2011 AFC Futsal Club Championship was named as Futsal Club of the Year. Fair Play Award was given to the South Korea national football team.

== Winners ==
=== Men ===
Only two players of shortlist competed for the award under a rule, which omitted nominees who didn't attend the ceremony.

| Rank | Player | Nationality | Club |
|---|---|---|---|
| Winner | Server Djeparov | Uzbekistan | (Saudi Arabia) Al-Shabab |
| Shortlist | Hadi Aghily | Iran | (Qatar) Al-Arabi |
| Shortlist | ~~Keisuke Honda~~ | ~~Japan~~ | (Russia) ~~CSKA Moscow~~ |
| Shortlist | ~~Koo Ja-Cheol~~ | ~~South Korea~~ | (Germany) ~~VfL Wolfsburg~~ |
| Shortlist | ~~Shinji Kagawa~~ | ~~Japan~~ | (Germany) ~~Borussia Dortmund~~ |
| Shortlist | ~~Yeom Ki-hun~~ | ~~South Korea~~ | (South Korea) ~~Suwon Samsung Bluewings~~ |

=== Women ===
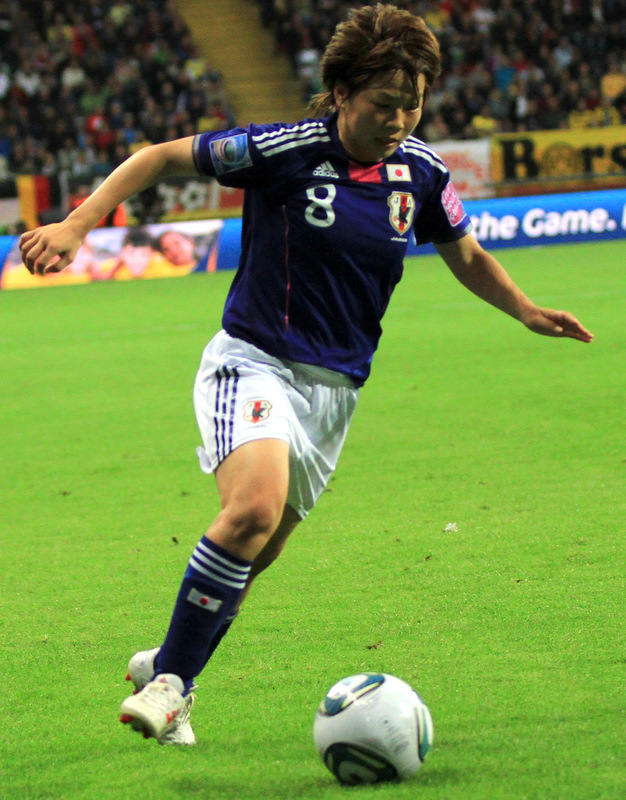
Aya Miyama, winner in 2011

| Rank | Player | Nationality | Club |
|---|---|---|---|
| Winner | Aya Miyama | Japan | (Japan) Okayama Yunogo Belle |
| Shortlist | Homare Sawa | Japan | (Japan) INAC Leonessa |
| Shortlist | Ayumi Kaihori | Japan | (Japan) INAC Leonessa |
| Shortlist | Melissa Barbieri | Australia | (Australia) Newcastle |
| Shortlist | Aya Sameshima | Japan | (France) Montpellier |
| Shortlist | Song Jong-Sun | North Korea | (North Korea) Rimyongsu |

=== Coach ===
| Rank | Coach | Nationality | Team |
|---|---|---|---|
| Winner | Norio Sasaki | Japan | Japan Women |
| Shortlist | Cho Kwang-rae | South Korea | South Korea |
| Shortlist | Vadim Abramov | Uzbekistan | Uzbekistan |
| Shortlist | Afshin Ghotbi | Iran | Iran |
| Shortlist | Gao Hongbo | China | China |
| Shortlist | Amir Ghalenoei | Iran | (Iran) Tractor Sazi |

=== Young Player ===
| Gender | Player | Nationality | Club |
|---|---|---|---|
| Men | Hideki Ishige | Japan | (Japan) Shimizu S-Pulse |
| Women | Caitlin Foord | Australia | (Australia) Sydney FC |

=== Futsal Player ===
| Player | Nationality | Club |
|---|---|---|
| Mohammad Keshavarz | Iran | (Iran) Giti Pasand |
