= 2014 AFC Annual Awards =

- Date: 30 November 2014
- Location: Manila, Philippines
- Presented by: Asian Football Confederation

Highlights
- AFC Player of the Year: Men's: (Saudi Arabia) Nasser Al-Shamrani; Women's: (Australia) Katrina Gorry
- AFC Coach of the Year: Men's: (Australia) Tony Popovic; Women's: (Japan) Asako Takakura
- AFC Youth Player of the Year: Men's: (Qatar) Ahmed Moein; Women's: (Japan) Hina Sugita
- AFC International Player of the Year: (Australia) Mile Jedinak
- AFC Futsal Player of the Year: (Iran) Ali Asghar Hassanzadeh
- Website: www.the-afc.com

The 2014 AFC Annual Awards was the fourth year for AFC's awards for the top football players and coaches of the year. The awards were given out in Manila on 30 November 2014.
