= 2019 EAFF E-1 Football Championship Final squads (women) =

The following is a list of squads for each nation competing in 2019 EAFF E-1 Football Championship (women) in Busan, South Korea. Each nation must submit a squad of 23 players, including 3 goalkeepers.

Age, caps and goals as of the start of the tournament, 10 December 2019.

== China ==
Head coach: Jia Xiuquan

No.	Pos.	Player	Date of birth (age)	Caps	Goals	Club
1	GK	Zhu Yu (朱钰)	23 July 1997 (age 27)			(China) Wuhan Jianghan University
2	DF	Liu Shanshan (刘杉杉)	16 March 1992 (age 33)			(China) Beijing BG Phoenix
3	DF	Lin Yuping (林宇萍)	28 February 1992 (age 33)			(China) Wuhan Jianghan University
4	DF	Li Mengwen (李梦雯)	28 March 1995 (age 29)			(China) Jiangsu Suning
5	DF	Wu Haiyan (吴海燕)	26 February 1993 (age 32)			(China) Wuhan Jianghan University
6	DF	Zhai Qingwei (翟晴苇)	24 September 1996 (age 28)			(China) Jiangsu Suning
7	FW	Wang Shuang (王霜)	23 January 1995 (age 30)			(China) Wuhan Jianghan University
8	MF	Ma Jun (马君)	6 March 1989 (age 36)			(China) Jiangsu Suning
9	MF	Tang Jiali (唐佳丽)	16 March 1995 (age 30)			(China) Jiangsu Suning
10	FW	Li Ying (李影)	7 January 1993 (age 32)			(China) Meizhou Huijun
11	FW	Yang Li (杨丽)	26 February 1993 (age 32)			(China) Jiangsu Suning
12	GK	Peng Shimeng (彭诗梦)	12 May 1998 (age 26)			(China) Jiangsu Suning
13	FW	Song Duan (宋端)	2 August 1995 (age 29)			(China) Dalian
14	DF	Wang Ying (王莹)	18 November 1997 (age 27)			(China) Wuhan Jianghan University
15	MF	Fang Jie (方洁)	11 November 1999 (age 25)			(China) Shanghai Shengli
16	FW	Yang Man (杨曼)	2 November 1995 (age 29)			(China) Shandong Sports Lottery
17	FW	Gu Yasha (古雅沙)	28 November 1990 (age 34)			(China) Beijing BG Phoenix
18	GK	Bi Xiaolin (毕晓琳)	18 September 1989 (age 35)			(China) Dalian
19	MF	Pang Fengyue (庞丰月)	19 January 1989 (age 36)			(China) Changchun Zhuoyue
20	MF	Zhang Rui (张睿)	17 January 1989 (age 36)			(China) Changchun Zhuoyue
21	MF	Yao Wei (姚伟)	1 September 1997 (age 27)			(China) Wuhan Jianghan University
22	DF	Luo Guiping (罗桂平)	20 April 1993 (age 31)			(China) Meizhou Huijun
23	FW	Zhang Xin (张馨)	23 May 1992 (age 32)			(China) Shanghai Shengli

== Chinese Taipei ==
Head coach: (Japan) Kazuo Echigo

No.	Pos.	Player	Date of birth (age)	Caps	Goals	Club
1	GK	Tsai Ming-jung (蔡明容)	23 January 1989 (age 36)		0	(Japan) FC Fujizakura
18	GK	Cheng Ssu-yu (程思瑜)	25 September 1989 (age 35)		0	(Chinese Taipei) Taichung Blue Whale
21	GK	Liao Wen-chi (廖玟淇)	8 August 1997 (age 27)		0	(Chinese Taipei) New Tapei Hang Yuen
23	GK	Chen Chiao-lun (陳巧倫)	24 December 1998 (age 26)		0	(Chinese Taipei) Kaohsiung Sunny Bank
5	DF	Li Pei-jung (李佩容)	25 April 2000 (age 24)		0	(Chinese Taipei) Taichung Blue Whale
6	DF	Pan Yen-hsin (潘彥昕)	18 February 1996 (age 29)		0	(Chinese Taipei) Taipei Bravo
16	DF	Chang Su-hsin (張愫心)	4 October 1990 (age 34)		0	(Chinese Taipei) Hualien
20	DF	Lee Wan-chen (李宛珍)	22 November 1997 (age 27)		0	(United States) UC Riverside
2	MF	Zhuo Li-ping (卓莉萍)	29 September 1999 (age 25)		3	(Chinese Taipei) Hualien
3	MF	Jhuo Li-shan (卓莉珊)	20 October 1996 (age 28)		0	(Chinese Taipei) Hualien
4	MF	Pao Hsin-hsuan (包欣玄)	1 September 1992 (age 32)		16	(Chinese Taipei) Taichung Blue Whale
8	MF	Wang Hsiang-huei (王湘惠)	28 September 1987 (age 37)		7	(Chinese Taipei) Hualien
11	MF	Lin Ya-hui (林雅惠)	27 November 1991 (age 33)		1	(Chinese Taipei) Taipei Bravo
12	MF	Chang Chi-lan (張季蘭)	18 September 1996 (age 28)		0	(Chinese Taipei) Taichung Blue Whale
14	MF	Lan Yu-chieh (藍昱絜)	16 November 2000 (age 24)		0	(Chinese Taipei) Kaohsiung Sunny Bank
15	MF	Nien Ching-yun (粘菁云)	18 February 2002 (age 23)		0	(Chinese Taipei) Taipei Bravo
22	MF	Ting Chia-ying (丁家英)	25 January 2002 (age 23)		0	(Chinese Taipei) Kaohsiung Sunny Bank
7	FW	Chen Yen-ping (陳燕萍)	20 August 1991 (age 33)		8	(Chinese Taipei) Hualien
9	FW	Lee Hsiu-chin (李綉琴)	18 August 1992 (age 32)		19	(Chinese Taipei) Taichung Blue Whale
10	FW	Tseng Shu-o (曾淑娥)	6 September 1984 (age 40)			Unattached
13	FW	Lin Hsin-hui (林欣卉)	6 February 2002 (age 23)		4	(Chinese Taipei) Taipei Bravo
17	FW	Ting Chi (丁旗)	2 June 1995 (age 29)		3	(Chinese Taipei) Hualien
19	FW	Su Yu-hsuan (蘇育萱)	21 February 2001 (age 24)		0	(Chinese Taipei) Taichung Blue Whale

== Japan ==
Head coach: Asako Takakura

No.	Pos.	Player	Date of birth (age)	Caps	Goals	Club
1	GK	Sakiko Ikeda (池田 咲紀子)	8 September 1992 (age 32)	14	0	(Japan) Urawa Red Diamonds
18	GK	Ayaka Yamashita (山下 杏也加)	29 September 1995 (age 29)	33	0	(Japan) Nippon TV Beleza
21	GK	Chika Hirao (平尾 知佳)	31 December 1996 (age 28)	2	0	(Japan) Albirex Niigata
20	DF	Arisa Matsubara (松原 有沙)	1 May 1995 (age 29)	2	0	(Japan) Nojima Stella
4	DF	Shiori Miyake (三宅 史織)	13 October 1995 (age 29)	19	0	(Japan) INAC Kobe Leonessa
22	DF	Mayo Doko (土光 真代)	3 May 1996 (age 28)	2	0	(Japan) Nippon TV Beleza
2	DF	Risa Shimizu (清水 梨紗)	15 June 1996 (age 28)	30	0	(Japan) Nippon TV Beleza
13	DF	Kiko Seike (清家 貴子)	8 August 1996 (age 28)	0	0	(Japan) Urawa Red Diamonds
16	DF	Asato Miyagawa (宮川 麻都)	24 February 1998 (age 27)	7	0	(Japan) Nippon TV Beleza
5	DF	Moeka Minami (南 萌華)	7 December 1998 (age 26)	7	0	(Japan) Urawa Red Diamonds
7	MF	Emi Nakajima (中島 依美)	27 September 1990 (age 34)	76	14	(Japan) INAC Kobe Leonessa
3	MF	Akari Kurishima (栗島 朱里)	14 September 1994 (age 30)	0	0	(Japan) Urawa Red Diamonds
10	MF	Yuka Momiki (籾木 結花)	9 April 1996 (age 28)	28	9	(Japan) Nippon TV Beleza
14	MF	Yui Hasegawa (長谷川 唯)	29 January 1997 (age 28)	41	8	(Japan) Nippon TV Beleza
6	MF	Hina Sugita (杉田 妃和)	31 January 1997 (age 28)	13	0	(Japan) INAC Kobe Leonessa
17	MF	Narumi Miura (三浦 成美)	3 July 1997 (age 27)	15	0	(Japan) Nippon TV Beleza
19	MF	Jun Endo (遠藤 純)	24 May 2000 (age 24)	10	0	(Japan) Nippon TV Beleza
23	MF	Honoka Hayashi (林 穂之香)	19 May 1998 (age 26)	0	0	(Japan) Cerezo Osaka Sakai
9	FW	Yuika Sugasawa (菅澤 優衣香)	5 October 1990 (age 34)	69	20	(Japan) Urawa Red Diamonds
8	FW	Mana Iwabuchi (岩渕 真奈)	18 March 1993 (age 32)	67	22	(Japan) INAC Kobe Leonessa
15	FW	Mina Tanaka (田中 美南)	28 April 1994 (age 30)	36	14	(Japan) Nippon TV Beleza
12	FW	Mayu Ikejiri (池尻 茉由)	19 December 1996 (age 28)	3	0	(South Korea) Suwon UDC
11	FW	Rikako Kobayashi (小林 里歌子)	21 July 1997 (age 27)	9	3	(Japan) Nippon TV Beleza

== South Korea ==
Head coach: (England) Colin Bell

No.	Pos.	Player	Date of birth (age)	Caps	Goals	Club
1	GK	Jeon Ha-neul (전하늘)	6 July 1992 (age 32)	0	0	(South Korea) Suwon UDC
2	DF	Lee Eun-mi (이은미)	18 August 1988 (age 36)	89	14	(South Korea) Suwon UDC
3	DF	Eo Hee-jin (어희진)	21 March 1991 (age 33)	4	0	(South Korea) Gumi Sportstoto
4	DF	Shim Seo-yeon (심서연)	15 April 1989 (age 35)	57	0	(South Korea) Incheon Hyundai Steel Red Angels
5	DF	Hong Hye-ji (홍혜지)	25 August 1996 (age 28)	20	1	(South Korea) Changnyeong
6	MF	Park Ye-eun (박예은)	17 October 1996 (age 28)	2	0	(South Korea) Gyeongju KHNP
7	MF	Lee Young-ju (이영주)	22 April 1992 (age 32)	32	2	(South Korea) Incheon Hyundai Steel Red Angels
8	MF	Lee So-dam (이소담)	12 October 1994 (age 30)	53	5	(South Korea) Incheon Hyundai Steel Red Angels
9	MF	Jung Seol-bin (정설빈)	6 January 1990 (age 35)	77	21	(South Korea) Incheon Hyundai Steel Red Angels
10	FW	Yeo Min-ji (여민지)	27 April 1993 (age 31)	38	13	(South Korea) Suwon UDC
11	DF	Park Se-ra (박세라)	24 February 1990 (age 35)	7	0	(South Korea) Gyeongju KHNP
12	FW	Kim Sang-eun (김상은)	31 December 1991 (age 33)	8	3	(South Korea) Gumi Sportstoto
13	MF	Jang Chang (장창)	21 June 1996 (age 28)	17	0	(South Korea) Seoul
14	MF	Kwon Eun-som (권은솜)	13 November 1990 (age 34)	15	4	(South Korea) Suwon UDC
15	MF	Jeon Eun-ha (전은하)	28 January 1993 (age 32)	9	0	(South Korea) Gyeongju KHNP
16	DF	Jang Sel-gi (장슬기)	31 May 1994 (age 30)	60	11	(South Korea) Incheon Hyundai Steel Red Angels
17	FW	Choe Yu-ri (최유리)	16 September 1994 (age 30)	24	4	(South Korea) Gumi Sportstoto
18	GK	Yoon Young-geul (윤영글)	28 October 1987 (age 37)	14	0	(South Korea) Gyeongju KHNP
19	FW	Son Hwa-yeon (손화연)	15 March 1997 (age 28)	21	7	(South Korea) Changnyeong
20	DF	Kim Hye-ri (김혜리)	25 June 1990 (age 34)	85	1	(South Korea) Incheon Hyundai Steel Red Angels
21	GK	Oh Eun-ah (오은아)	17 January 1994 (age 31)	0	0	(South Korea) Seoul
22	FW	Kang Chae-rim (강채림)	23 March 1998 (age 26)	6	0	(South Korea) Incheon Hyundai Steel Red Angels
23	FW	Choo Hyo-ju (추효주)	29 July 2000 (age 24)	0	0	(South Korea) Ulsan College
