= 2017 EAFF E-1 Football Championship Final squads (women) =

The following is a list of squads for each nation competing in 2017 EAFF E-1 Football Championship Final Women in Chiba, Japan. Each nation must submit a squad of 23 players, including 3 goalkeepers.

Age, caps and goals as of the start of the tournament, 8 December 2017.

== China ==
Head coach: (Iceland) Sigurður Ragnar Eyjólfsson

No.	Pos.	Player	Date of birth (age)	Caps	Goals	Club
1	GK	Zhao Lina	18 September 1991 (aged 26)			(Chinese Football Association) Shanghai WFC
18	GK	Li Xueyan	23 February 1994 (aged 23)			(Chinese Football Association) Changchun Rural Commercial Bank
22	GK	Lu Feifei	10 November 1995 (aged 22)			(Chinese Football Association) Jiangsu Suning
2	DF	Liu Shanshan	16 March 1992 (aged 25)			(Chinese Football Association) Hebei China Fortune
3	DF	Li Danyang	8 April 1990 (aged 27)			(Chinese Football Association) Dalian Quanjian
4	DF	Xue Jiao	30 January 1993 (aged 24)			(Chinese Football Association) Dalian Quanjian
5	DF	Wu Haiyan	26 February 1993 (aged 24)			(Chinese Football Association) Shandong Sports Lottery
6	DF	Li Dongna	6 December 1988 (aged 29)			(Chinese Football Association) Dalian Quanjian
8	DF	Ma Jun (captain)	6 March 1989 (aged 28)			(Chinese Football Association) Jiangsu Suning
19	DF	Wang Yan	22 August 1991 (aged 26)			(Chinese Football Association) Dalian Quanjian
12	MF	Jin Kun	4 October 1999 (aged 18)			(Chinese Football Association) Jiangsu Suning
13	MF	Pang Fengyue	19 January 1989 (aged 28)			(Chinese Football Association) Dalian Quanjian
14	MF	Xu Yanlu	16 September 1991 (aged 26)			(Chinese Football Association) Jiangsu Suning
15	MF	Song Duan	2 August 1995 (aged 22)			(Chinese Football Association) Dalian Quanjian
16	MF	Han Peng	20 December 1989 (aged 27)			(Chinese Football Association) Tianjin Huisen
17	MF	Li Ying	7 January 1993 (aged 24)			(Chinese Football Association) Shandong Sports Lottery
20	MF	Zhang Rui	17 January 1989 (aged 28)			(Chinese Football Association) Changchun Rural Commercial Bank
21	MF	Xiao Yuyi	10 January 1996 (aged 21)			(Chinese Football Association) Shanghai WFC
23	MF	Ren Guixin	19 December 1988 (aged 28)			(Chinese Football Association) Changchun Rural Commercial Bank
7	FW	Wang Shuang	23 January 1995 (aged 22)			(Chinese Football Association) Dalian Quanjian
9	FW	Tang Jiali	16 March 1995 (aged 22)			(Chinese Football Association) Shanghai WFC
10	FW	Yao Lingwei	5 December 1995 (aged 22)			(Chinese Football Association) Jiangsu Suning
11	FW	Wang Shanshan	27 January 1990 (aged 27)			(Chinese Football Association) Tianjin Huisen

== Japan ==
Head coach: (Japan) Asako Takakura

No.	Pos.	Player	Date of birth (age)	Caps	Goals	Club
1	GK	Sakiko Ikeda	8 September 1992 (aged 25)			(Japan Football Association) Urawa Red Diamonds
18	GK	Ayaka Yamashita	29 September 1995 (aged 22)			(Japan Football Association) NTV Beleza
21	GK	Mamiko Matsumoto	9 October 1997 (aged 20)			(Japan Football Association) Urawa Red Diamonds
2	DF	Ayumi Oya	8 November 1994 (aged 23)			(Japan Football Association) Ehime FC
3	DF	Aya Sameshima	16 June 1987 (aged 30)			(Japan Football Association) INAC Kobe Leonessa
4	DF	Riho Sakamoto	7 July 1992 (aged 25)			(Japan Football Association) AC Nagano Parceiro
6	DF	Rumi Utsugi (captain)	5 December 1988 (aged 29)			(United States Soccer Federation) Seattle Reign
19	DF	Hikaru Kitagawa	10 May 1997 (aged 20)			(Japan Football Association) Urawa Red Diamonds
20	DF	Miho Manya	5 November 1996 (aged 21)			(Japan Football Association) Vegalta Sendai
22	DF	Hikari Takagi	21 May 1993 (aged 24)			(Japan Football Association) Kanagawa Sagamihara
23	DF	Shiori Miyake	13 October 1995 (aged 22)			(Japan Football Association) INAC Kobe Leonessa
7	MF	Emi Nakajima	27 September 1990 (aged 27)			(Japan Football Association) INAC Kobe Leonessa
10	MF	Mizuho Sakaguchi	15 October 1987 (aged 30)			(Japan Football Association) NTV Beleza
12	MF	Hikaru Naomoto	3 March 1994 (aged 23)			(Japan Football Association) Urawa Red Diamonds
14	MF	Yu Nakasato	14 July 1994 (aged 23)			(Japan Football Association) NTV Beleza
16	MF	Rin Sumida	12 January 1996 (aged 21)			(Japan Football Association) NTV Beleza
17	MF	Yui Hasegawa	29 January 1997 (aged 20)			(Japan Football Association) NTV Beleza
5	FW	Madoka Haji	8 July 1988 (aged 29)			(Japan Football Association) Iga Kunoichi
8	FW	Mana Iwabuchi	18 March 1993 (aged 24)			(Japan Football Association) INAC Kobe Leonessa
9	FW	Yuika Sugasawa	5 October 1990 (aged 27)			(Japan Football Association) Urawa Red Diamonds
11	FW	Mina Tanaka	28 April 1994 (aged 23)			(Japan Football Association) NTV Beleza
13	FW	Mami Ueno	27 September 1996 (aged 21)			(Japan Football Association) Ehime FC
15	FW	Yuka Momiki	9 April 1996 (aged 21)			(Japan Football Association) NTV Beleza

== North Korea ==
Head coach: (North Korea) Kim Kwang-min

No.	Pos.	Player	Date of birth (age)	Caps	Goals	Club
1	GK	Ra Sol-ju	13 January 1994 (aged 23)			(DPR Korea Football Association) April 25
18	GK	Kim Myong-sun	6 March 1997 (aged 20)			(DPR Korea Football Association) Sobaeksu
21	GK	Paek Yong-hui	16 April 1990 (aged 27)			(DPR Korea Football Association) Pyongyang City
2	DF	Ri Un-yong	1 September 1996 (aged 21)			(DPR Korea Football Association) Sobaeksu
3	DF	Pak Hye-gyong	7 November 2001 (aged 16)			(DPR Korea Football Association) April 25
15	DF	Kim Nam-hui (captain)	4 March 1994 (aged 23)			(DPR Korea Football Association) April 25
16	DF	Kim Un-ha	23 March 1993 (aged 24)			(DPR Korea Football Association) Sobaeksu
17	DF	Son Ok-ju	7 March 2000 (aged 17)			(DPR Korea Football Association) Rimyongsu
22	DF	Ri Un-jong	6 November 1999 (aged 18)			(DPR Korea Football Association) Sobaeksu
4	MF	Pak Sin-jong	27 July 1997 (aged 20)			(DPR Korea Football Association) Amrokkang
5	MF	Wi Jong-sim	13 October 1997 (aged 20)			(DPR Korea Football Association) Kalmaegi
6	MF	Ju Hyo-sim	21 June 1998 (aged 19)			(DPR Korea Football Association) April 25
7	MF	Kim Un-hwa	30 September 1992 (aged 25)			(DPR Korea Football Association) Wolmido
8	MF	Yu Jong-im	6 December 1993 (aged 24)			(DPR Korea Football Association) Amrokkang
13	MF	Kim Phyong-hwa	28 November 1996 (aged 21)			(DPR Korea Football Association) Sobaeksu
14	MF	Ri Hyang-sim	23 March 1996 (aged 21)			(DPR Korea Football Association) Amrokkang
19	MF	Kim Su-gyong	4 January 1995 (aged 22)			(DPR Korea Football Association) April 25
23	MF	Pang Un-sim	29 June 2001 (aged 16)			(DPR Korea Football Association) Naegohyang
9	FW	Jang Hyon-sun	1 July 1991 (aged 26)			(DPR Korea Football Association) Wolmido
10	FW	Ri Kyong-hyang	10 June 1996 (aged 21)			(DPR Korea Football Association) April 25
11	FW	Sung Hyang-sim	2 December 1999 (aged 18)			(DPR Korea Football Association) Pyongyang City
12	FW	Kim Yun-mi	1 July 1993 (aged 24)			(DPR Korea Football Association) Amrokkang
20	FW	Ri Hae-yon	10 January 1999 (aged 18)			(DPR Korea Football Association) April 25

== South Korea ==
Head coach: (South Korea) Yoon Deok-yeo

No.	Pos.	Player	Date of birth (age)	Caps	Goals	Club
1	GK	Kang Ga-ae	10 December 1990 (aged 26)	9	0	(Korea Football Association) Gumi Sportstoto
18	GK	Kim Jung-mi	16 October 1984 (aged 33)	110	0	(Korea Football Association) Incheon Hyundai Steel Red Angels
21	GK	Kim Min-jung	12 September 1996 (aged 21)	2	0	(Korea Football Association) Suwon FMC
2	DF	Lee Eun-mi	18 August 1988 (aged 29)	77	13	(Korea Football Association) Suwon FMC
3	DF	Park Cho-rong	20 February 1988 (aged 29)	2	0	(Korea Football Association) Hwacheon KSPO
4	DF	Shin Dam-yeong	2 October 1993 (aged 24)	26	1	(Korea Football Association) Suwon FMC
5	DF	Kim Do-yeon	7 December 1988 (aged 29)	74	1	(Korea Football Association) Incheon Hyundai Steel Red Angels
6	DF	Lim Seon-joo	27 November 1990 (aged 27)	61	3	(Korea Football Association) Incheon Hyundai Steel Red Angels
16	DF	Jang Sel-gi	31 May 1994 (aged 23)	32	8	(Korea Football Association) Incheon Hyundai Steel Red Angels
20	DF	Kim Hye-ri	25 June 1990 (aged 27)	64	1	(Korea Football Association) Incheon Hyundai Steel Red Angels
7	MF	Son Yun-hee	29 December 1989 (aged 27)	2	0	(Korea Football Association) Hwacheon KSPO
8	MF	Cho So-hyun (captain)	24 June 1988 (aged 29)	102	16	(Korea Football Association) Incheon Hyundai Steel Red Angels
9	MF	Kang Yu-mi	5 October 1991 (aged 26)	21	7	(Korea Football Association) Hwacheon KSPO
10	MF	Lee Min-a	8 November 1991 (aged 26)	35	6	(Korea Football Association) Incheon Hyundai Steel Red Angels
13	MF	Lee Young-ju	22 April 1992 (aged 25)	19	2	(Korea Football Association) Incheon Hyundai Steel Red Angels
14	MF	Lee Jung-eun	15 December 1993 (aged 23)	8	6	(Korea Football Association) Hwacheon KSPO
15	MF	Lee So-dam	12 October 1994 (aged 23)	38	4	(Korea Football Association) Gumi Sportstoto
17	MF	Jang Chang	21 June 1996 (aged 21)	4	0	(Korea Football Association) Korea University
19	MF	Choe Yu-ri	16 September 1994 (aged 23)	17	4	(Korea Football Association) Gumi Sportstoto
11	FW	Jung Seol-bin	6 January 1990 (aged 27)	62	19	(Korea Football Association) Incheon Hyundai Steel Red Angels
12	FW	Yoo Young-a	15 April 1988 (aged 29)	84	32	(Korea Football Association) Gumi Sportstoto
22	FW	Han Chae-rin	2 September 1996 (aged 21)	2	1	(Korea Football Association) Uiduk University
23	FW	Son Hwa-yeon	15 March 1997 (aged 20)	3	2	(Korea Football Association) Korea University
