= 2015 EAFF Women's East Asian Cup Final squads =

Below are the squads for the 2015 EAFF Women's East Asian Cup tournament, held in China on August 1 to 8, 2015. There were 23 players in each squad, including 3 goalkeepers.

== North Korea ==
Head coach: Kim Kwang-Min

No.	Pos.	Player	Date of birth (age)	Caps	Goals	Club
1	GK	Hong Myong-hui	4 September 1991 (aged 23)			
18	GK	Ra Sol-ju	13 January 1994 (aged 21)			
21	GK	Choe Kyong-im	25 July 1993 (aged 22)			
2	DF	Yun Song-mi	28 January 1992 (aged 23)			
3	DF	Ri Hui-jong	20 February 1998 (aged 17)			
4	DF	Pak Sin-jong	27 July 1997 (aged 18)			
5	DF	Ri Un-yong	1 September 1996 (aged 18)			
6	DF	Kim Un-hyang	26 August 1993 (aged 21)			
15	DF	Kim Nan-hui	4 March 1994 (aged 21)			
16	DF	Kim Un-ha	23 March 1993 (aged 22)			
20	DF	Jon So-yon	25 July 1996 (aged 19)			
7	MF	Kim Su-Gyong	4 January 1995 (aged 20)			
8	MF	Kim Un-ju	9 March 1993 (aged 22)			
11	MF	Ri Ye-Gyong	26 October 1989 (aged 25)			
13	MF	Wi Jong-sim	13 October 1997 (aged 17)			
14	MF	Ju Hyo-sim	21 June 1998 (aged 17)			
17	MF	Ri Hyang-sim	26 March 1996 (aged 19)			
19	MF	Kim Phyong-hwa	28 November 1996 (aged 18)			
9	FW	Ri Un-sim	20 May 1996 (aged 19)			
10	FW	Ra Un-sim	2 July 1988 (aged 27)			
12	FW	Kim Yun-mi	1 July 1993 (aged 22)			

== Japan ==
Head coach: Norio Sasaki

No.	Pos.	Player	Date of birth (age)	Caps	Goals	Club
1	GK	Erina Yamane	20 December 1990 (aged 24)	15	0	(Japan Football Association) JEF United Ichihara Chiba Ladies
18	GK	Rei Takenaka	18 May 1992 (aged 23)	0	0	(Japan Football Association) Vegalta Sendai Ladies
21	GK	Ayaka Yamashita	29 September 1995 (aged 19)	0	0	(Japan Football Association) NTV Beleza
3	DF	Kana Kitahara	17 December 1988 (aged 26)	8	0	(Japan Football Association) Albirex Niigata Ladies
4	DF	Tomoko Muramatsu	23 October 1994 (aged 20)	0	0	(Japan Football Association) NTV Beleza
5	DF	Ryoko Takara	9 April 1990 (aged 25)	1	0	(Japan Football Association) Vegalta Sendai Ladies
14	DF	Asuna Tanaka	23 April 1988 (aged 27)	34	3	(Japan Football Association) INAC Kobe Leonessa
19	DF	Rie Azami	11 January 1989 (aged 26)	1	0	(Japan Football Association) AS Elfen Saitama
20	DF	Shiho Kohata	12 November 1989 (aged 25)	1	0	(Japan Football Association) Urawa Reds Ladies
2	MF	Emi Nakajima	27 September 1990 (aged 24)	21	5	(Japan Football Association) INAC Kobe Leonessa
6	MF	Yuri Kawamura (c)	17 May 1989 (aged 26)	15	2	(Japan Football Association) Vegalta Sendai Ladies
7	MF	Yumi Uetsuji	30 November 1987 (aged 27)	3	0	(Japan Football Association) NTV Beleza
8	MF	Hikaru Naomoto	3 March 1994 (aged 21)	6	0	(Japan Football Association) Urawa Reds Ladies
10	MF	Megumi Kamionobe	15 March 1986 (aged 29)	31	2	(Japan Football Association) Albirex Niigata Ladies
12	MF	Rika Masuya	14 September 1995 (aged 19)	7	2	(Japan Football Association) INAC Kobe Leonessa
13	MF	Mai Kyokawa	28 December 1993 (aged 21)	2	0	(Japan Football Association) INAC Kobe Leonessa
16	MF	Kumi Yokoyama	13 August 1993 (aged 21)	1	1	(Japan Football Association) AC Nagano Parceiro Ladies
22	MF	Ami Sugita	14 March 1992 (aged 23)	1	0	(Japan Football Association) Iga Football Club Kunoichi
23	MF	Hanae Shibata	27 July 1992 (aged 23)	0	0	(Japan Football Association) Urawa Reds Ladies
9	FW	Yuika Sugasawa	5 October 1990 (aged 24)	32	10	(Japan Football Association) JEF United Ichihara Chiba Ladies
11	FW	Megumi Takase	10 November 1990 (aged 24)	56	9	(Japan Football Association) INAC Kobe Leonessa
15	FW	Mina Tanaka	28 April 1994 (aged 21)	4	1	(Japan Football Association) NTV Beleza
17	FW	Saori Arimachi	12 July 1988 (aged 27)	1	0	(Japan Football Association) Vegalta Sendai Ladies

== China ==
Head coach: Hao Wei

== South Korea ==
Head coach: Yoon Deok-yeo

No.	Pos.	Player	Date of birth (age)	Caps	Goals	Club
1	GK	Jun Min-kyung	16 January 1985 (aged 30)	45	0	(Korea Football Association) Icheon Daekyo
18	GK	Kim Jung-mi	16 October 1984 (aged 30)	93	0	(Korea Football Association) Incheon Hyundai Steel
2	DF	Lee Eun-mi	18 August 1988 (aged 26)	63	12	(Korea Football Association) Icheon Daekyo
3	DF	Lim Seon-joo	27 November 1990 (aged 24)	44	1	(Korea Football Association) Incheon Hyundai Steel
4	DF	Shim Seo-yeon	15 April 1989 (aged 26)	53	0	(Korea Football Association) Icheon Daekyo
5	DF	Kim Do-yeon	7 December 1988 (aged 26)	62	1	(Korea Football Association) Incheon Hyundai Steel
6	DF	Hwang Bo-ram	6 October 1987 (aged 27)	35	0	(Korea Football Association) Icheon Daekyo
7	DF	Kim Soo-yun	30 August 1989 (aged 25)	45	10	(Korea Football Association) Hwacheon KSPO
16	DF	Seo Hyun-sook	6 January 1992 (aged 23)	17	0	(Korea Football Association) Icheon Daekyo
20	DF	Kim Hye-ri	25 June 1990 (aged 25)	48	1	(Korea Football Association) Incheon Hyundai Steel
8	MF	Cho So-hyun	24 June 1988 (aged 27)	82	9	(Korea Football Association) Incheon Hyundai Steel
9	MF	Kang Yu-mi	5 October 1991 (aged 23)	7	0	(Korea Football Association) Hwacheon KSPO
10	MF	Jeon Ga-eul	14 September 1988 (aged 26)	70	33	(Korea Football Association) Incheon Hyundai Steel
14	MF	Son Yun-hee	29 December 1989 (aged 25)	1	0	(Korea Football Association) Hwacheon KSPO
15	MF	Kim Sang-eun	31 December 1991 (aged 23)	7	3	(Korea Football Association) Icheon Daekyo
22	MF	Lee So-dam	12 October 1994 (aged 20)	20	1	(Korea Football Association) Daejeon Sportstoto
23	MF	Lee Geum-min	7 April 1994 (aged 21)	9	1	(Korea Football Association) Seoul
11	FW	Jung Seol-bin	6 January 1990 (aged 25)	43	11	(Korea Football Association) Incheon Hyundai Steel
13	FW	Kwon Hah-nul	7 March 1988 (aged 27)	98	15	(Korea Football Association) Busan Sangmu
19	FW	Jang Sel-gi	31 May 1994 (aged 21)	8	0	(Japan Football Association) INAC Kobe Leonessa
