= Ichihara =

Ichihara may refer to:

- Ichihara (surname), a Japanese surname
- Ichihara, Chiba, a city in Japan
  - JEF United Ichihara Chiba, the city's football club
- Ichihara Station, a train station in Kyoto, Japan
