= Japan women's national football team =

Women's national association football team representing Japan

Japan
- Nickname: なでしこジャパン (Nadeshiko Japan)
- Association: Japan Football Association (JFA)
- Confederation: AFC (Asia)
- Sub-confederation: EAFF (East Asia)
- Head coach: Michihisa Kano
- Captain: Yui Hasegawa
- Most caps: Homare Sawa (205)
- Top scorer: Homare Sawa (83)
- FIFA code: JPN
First colours	Second colours

FIFA ranking
- Current: 5 (20 October 2026)
- Highest: 3 (December 2011 – September 2014)
- Lowest: 14 (July 2003 – March 2004)

First international
- Chinese Taipei 1–0 Japan (British Hong Kong; 7 June 1981)

Biggest win
- Japan 21–0 Guam (Guangzhou, China; 5 December 1997)

Biggest defeat
- Italy 9–0 Japan (Tokyo, Japan; 9 September 1981); United States 9–0 Japan (Charlotte, United States; 29 April 1999)

World Cup
- Appearances: 10 (first in 1991)
- Best result: Champions (2011)

Olympic Games
- Appearances: 6 (first in 1996)
- Best result: Runners-up (2012)

Asian Cup
- Appearances: 18 (first in 1977)
- Best result: Champions (2014, 2018, 2026)
Medal record
World Cup
Gold medal – first place	2011 Germany	Team
Silver medal – second place	2015 Canada	Team
Olympic Games
Silver medal – second place	2012 London	Team
Asian Cup
Gold medal – first place	2014 Vietnam	Team
Gold medal – first place	2018 Jordan	Team
Gold medal – first place	2026 Australia	Team
Silver medal – second place	1986 Hong Kong	Team
Silver medal – second place	1991 Japan	Team
Silver medal – second place	1995 Malaysia	Team
Silver medal – second place	2001 Taiwan	Team
Bronze medal – third place	1989 Hong Kong	Team
Bronze medal – third place	1993 Malaysia	Team
Bronze medal – third place	1997 China	Team
Bronze medal – third place	2008 Vietnam	Team
Bronze medal – third place	2010 China	Team
Bronze medal – third place	2022 India	Team
Asian Games
Gold medal – first place	2010 Guangzhou	Team
Gold medal – first place	2018 Jakarta-Palembang	Team
Gold medal – first place	2022 Hangzhou	Team
Gold medal – first place	2026 Nagoya	Team
Silver medal – second place	1990 Beijing	Team
Silver medal – second place	1994 Hiroshima	Team
Silver medal – second place	2006 Doha	Team
Silver medal – second place	2014 Incheon	Team
Bronze medal – third place	1998 Bangkok	Team
Bronze medal – third place	2002 Busan	Team
- Website: jfa.jp/eng/nadeshikojapan/

The Japan women's national football team (Japanese: サッカー日本女子代表, Hepburn: Sakkā Nippon Joshi Daihyō), commonly known as Nadeshiko Japan (なでしこジャパン), represents Japan in women's association football and is run by the Japan Football Association (JFA). One of the two countries to win every FIFA competition and the most successful women's national team in the Asian Football Confederation, its highest ranking in the FIFA Women's World Rankings is 3rd, achieved in December 2011.

Japan participated at every FIFA Women's World Cup in history, reaching the final twice; they defeated the United States in the 2011 FIFA Women's World Cup Final, claiming their first World Cup title, and becoming the first Asian team to do so and only the fourth women's world champions. It won silver medals at the 2012 Summer Olympics and the 2015 FIFA Women's World Cup, making it the only Asian team to have three combined medals from international championships. Japan were the Asian Cup champions three times, in 2014, 2018 and 2026. They also won gold medals at the Asian Games in 2010, 2018, 2022, and 2026, and at the EAFF Football Championships in 2008, 2010, 2019 and 2022.

== History ==
=== 1970s and 1980s ===
During the 1970s, the number of women football players and teams increased in Japan, and teams made up regional leagues in various parts of Japan. In 1977, a team representing Japan participated in its first international tournament, the 1977 AFC Women's Championship. But this team was not actually a national team, since the Japan Football Association dispatched a club team, FC Jinnan as its representative. In 1980, "All-Japan Women's Football Championship" was held. In 1981, the Japan Football Association formed the first national team for the 1981 AFC Women's Championship and Seiki Ichihara managed as the first Japan national team manager. The first match against Chinese Taipei on 7 June at this tournament was the first match for a Japan national team. In 1984, a national team was gathered for the first time in three years for a China expedition, with Takao Orii managing the squad.

In January 1986, Ryohei Suzuki became the first full-time manager for the national team. In December, Japan won 2nd place at the 1986 AFC Women's Championship. In 1989, the "Japan Women's Football League" (abbreviated to "L. League") was established, and the women's national team qualified for the "1991 FIFA Women's World Cup" in China.

=== Verge of decline (1990s) ===
Japan women's national football team attended various championship tournaments such as the 1996 Summer Olympics and the 1995 FIFA Women's World Cup which had made the national team and the L.League very popular. However, in 1999, Japan failed to qualify for the 2000 Summer Olympics, and along with economic stagnation (Lost Decade) this helped cause the withdrawal of a series of teams from the L. League. Japanese women's football was on the verge of decline.

=== Regeneration (2002–2008) ===
In August 2002, the Japan Football Association appointed Eiji Ueda, who had been coach for the Macau national football team, as the new head coach. Officials expected a revitalization of women's football and planned a team reorganization, aiming for the 2004 Summer Olympics. The team at first went through a losing streak, but Ueda gradually improved the team, and it eventually gained wide support in Japan. In particular, a game against Korea DPR, which decided who would participate in the 2004 Olympics, not only made fans rush to the National Stadium but also was widely watched on TV.

Following the increase in public interest in women's football in Japan, the JFA organized a public contest to select a nickname for the team. "Nadeshiko Japan" was chosen from among about 2,700 entries and was announced on 7 July 2004. "Nadeshiko", a kind of dianthus, comes from the phrase "Yamato Nadeshiko" (大和撫子, "ideal Japanese woman").

==== 2003 and 2007 World Cup ====
Japan faced Germany, Canada and Argentina for the 2003 FIFA Women's World Cup. Beginning with a 6–0 thrashing of newcomer Argentina, Japan subsequently fell 0–3 to the eventual champions Germany, followed by a loss of 1–3 to Canada, the team that ultimately finished 4th.

In the 2007 FIFA Women's World Cup held in China, they again faced Germany and Argentina, with England making up the group. They started with a 2–2 draw against England, before beating Argentina 1–0. A 0–2 defeat to reigning champion Germany again eliminated Japan from the group stage.

==== 2008 Summer Olympics ====
After qualifying from the preliminary round, Nadeshiko faced the United States, Norway and New Zealand in Group C of the Women's Olympic Football Tournament in Beijing.

In the first match, they drew 2-2 with the Football Ferns of New Zealand and then lost 1-0 to the Americans in the second match. However, as the two best third-placed teams progressed, Japan secured qualification for the quarter-finals with a 5-1 win over Norway in the final match of the group phase.

In the quarter-finals, the Japanese eliminated the host China with a 2-0 victory thanks to goals from Homare Sawa and Yuki Nagasato. It was the first time that Japan had advanced beyond the quarter-finals in any international women's football competition.

At the semifinals, Japan met the United States again, but just like in the group stage, the Americans came out on top, winning 4-2. In the bronze medal match, Nadeshiko ended up being defeated by Germany 2-0.

==== 2010 AFC Women's Asian Cup ====
Like the 2008 Women's Olympic Football Tournament, the 2010 AFC Women's Asian Cup was also held in China. Japan was drawn in Group A with North Korea, Thailand and Myanmar.

After two thrashings against Myanmar (7-0) and Thailand (4-0), Nadeshiko finished the group stage as leaders, beating North Korea 2-1. In the semi-finals, however, they were defeated by Australia thanks to a goal by Kate Gill before the end of the first half. The Matildas would go on to win the tournament.

In the third-place play-off, Japan defeated hosts China 2-0 and secured the last Asian spot in the 2011 FIFA Women's World Cup (Australia and North Korea also qualified as finalists in that tournament).

=== Golden period and World Champions (2011–2015) ===
==== 2011 World Cup ====
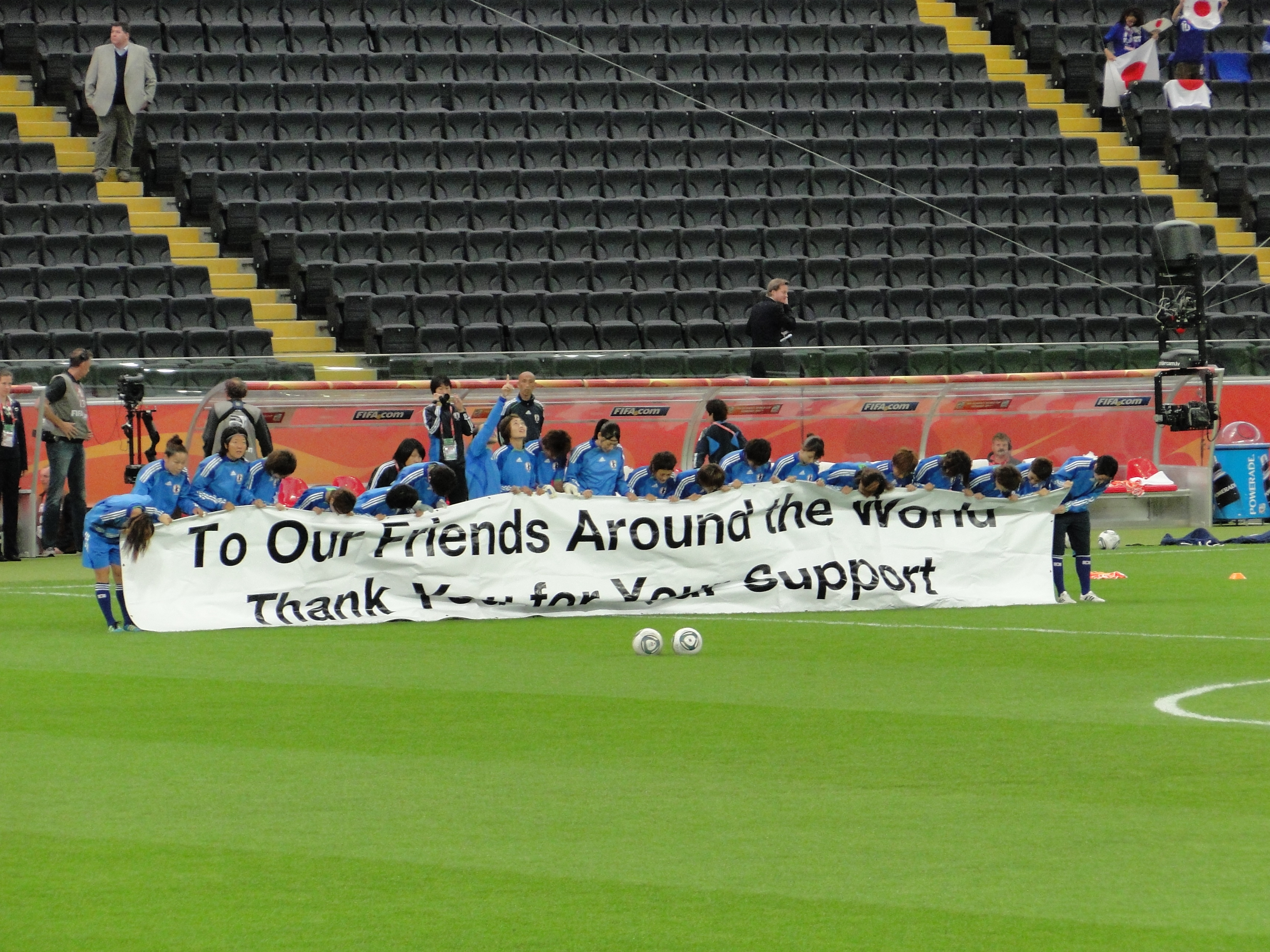
The Japan team thanking fans for their support for the humanitarian response to the 2011 Tōhoku earthquake and tsunami after their World Cup win

After finishing third in the 2010 AFC Women's Asian Cup, Japan qualified for the FIFA Women's World Cup 2011 finals in Germany. There were certain doubts whether Nadeshiko would play in that tournament due to the 2011 Tohoku earthquake and tsunami which happened a couple of months before, but the participation was confirmed at the last minute.

After finishing second in their group behind England, Japan shocked the world beating two-time defending champion and host nation Germany 1–0 in the quarterfinals, before easily defeating Sweden 3–1 to reach the final.

After the final game finished 2–2 after extra time, Japan beat the United States 3–1 in a penalty shootout, becoming the first Asian team to win the FIFA Women's World Cup, and the first Asian team to win a senior FIFA title. It came right after men's team won the 2011 AFC Asian Cup, marked their most successful year in Japanese football.

==== 2012 Summer Olympics ====
Japan qualified for the 2012 Summer Olympics by finishing first in the Asian qualifier in September 2011, only 6 weeks after winning the Women's World Cup. At the Olympics, after finishing second in their group behind Sweden, Nadeshiko Japan defeated Brazil 2–0 in the quarterfinals, followed by a 2–1 victory over France, whom Nadeshiko had lost to in a friendly match right before the Olympics, to reach the final.

In a rematch of the World Cup final, Japan was defeated in the Olympic final by a score of 1–2 against the United States, allowing two goals to Carli Lloyd in the 8th and 54th minutes. Yūki Ōgimi scored the lone goal for Japan.

The Japan Football Association (JFA) was accused of sexism, after flying the men's Olympic team on business class and the women's team on economy class.

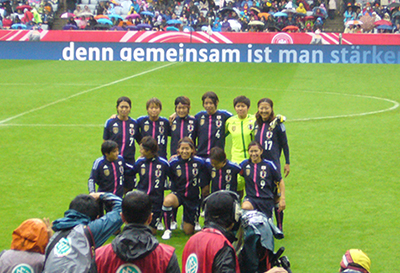
Nadeshiko, 2013

==== 2014 AFC Women's Asian Cup ====
Despite having won a FIFA Women's World Cup in 2011, Japan entered the 2014 Asian Cup having never previously won the tournament. They were drawn with defending champions Australia, host Vietnam and newcomer Jordan. Their first match in the group stage of the tournament resulted in a 2–2 draw against the Matildas. Also in the group stage, Japan upset host Vietnam by a 4–0 win before defeating Jordan with a 7–0 win to finish first with a higher goal difference.

In the semi-final, Japan beat eight-time champions China 2–1 after 120'. In the final, they met Australia once again and successfully earned a 1–0 win with Azusa Iwashimizu's goal. This marked the first time for Japan to become "Queen of Asia". They became the first Asian team to subsequently win both the FIFA Women's World Cup and AFC Women's Asian Cup. Because of their top placement in the tournament, Japan, Australia, China, South Korea and newcomer Thailand secured their spot at the 2015 FIFA Women's World Cup to be played in Canada the following year.

==== 2015 World Cup ====
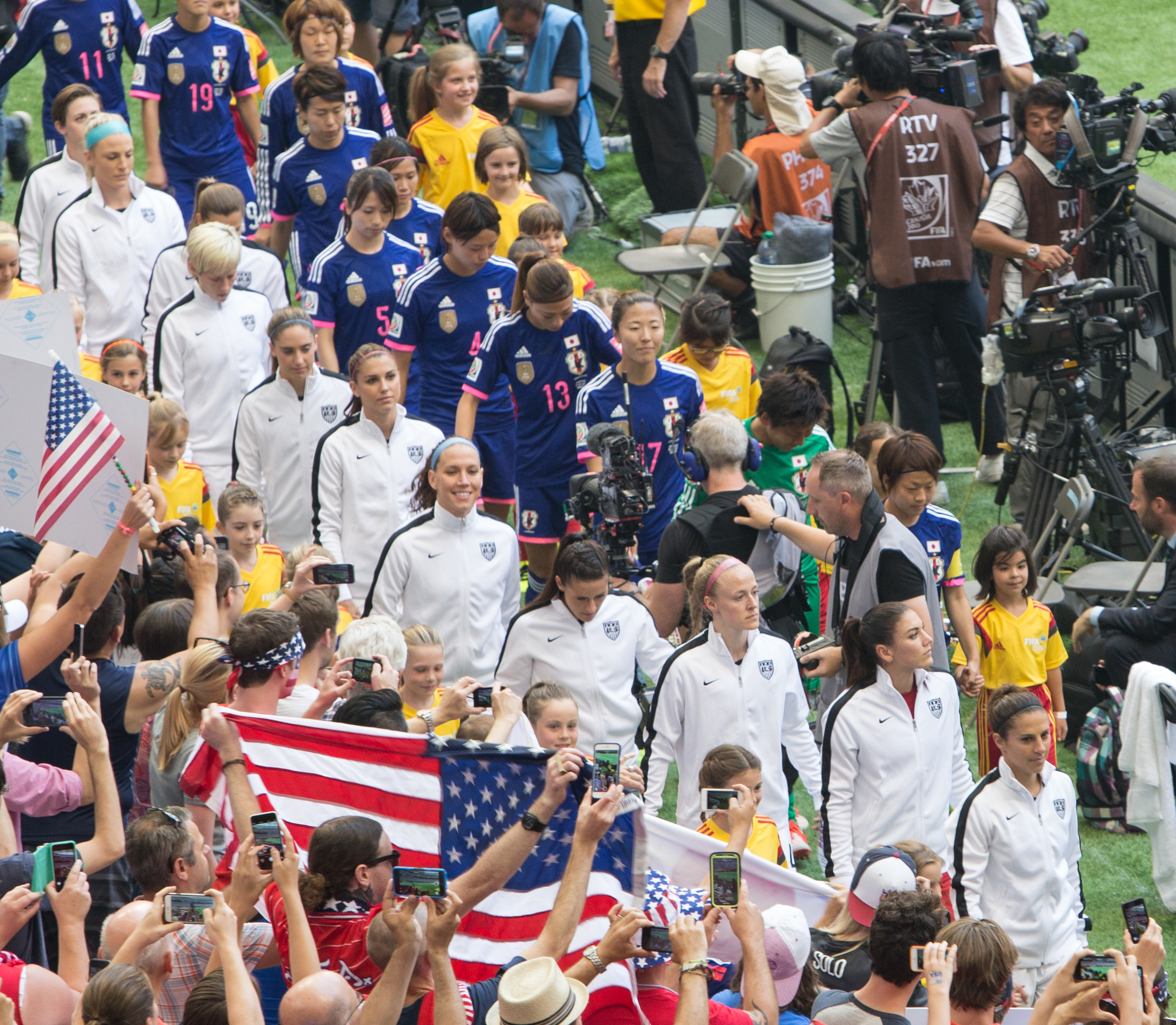
The national teams of Japan and the United States at the 2015 FIFA Women's World Cup

Japan, then fourth in the world, was drawn into Group C for the 2015 FIFA Women's World Cup, with tournament debutants Ecuador, Switzerland, and Cameroon. Japan won all three games, securing passage into the Round of 16, where they drew yet another tournament debutant in the Netherlands. Saori Ariyoshi and Mizuho Sakaguchi scored goals for Japan, and they ultimately survived a couple of nervy moments to get into the quarterfinals.

In a all-Asian quarterfinal against Australia, Japan once again used their technical possession game to frustrate the Matildas and negate their speed. Mana Iwabuchi notched the only goal of the game three minutes from time to send Japan to the semifinals.

Against England in the semifinals, Nadeshiko Japan was able to survive against the Lionesses, as the two teams traded goals from the penalty spot (Aya Miyama for Japan, Fara Williams for England). Deadlocked from the 40th minute on, Japan got abreak as English centre back Laura Bassett, in trying to clear out a Japan cross, ended up scoring an own-goal at the death. This set up a rematch with the United States from the 2011 Women's World Cup.

Unfortunately for Japan, the Americans came out flying and scored four goals in the first 16 minutes of the match, with American midfielder Carli Lloyd scoring a hat trick in the process. Yuki Ogimi brought Japan one back in the 27th minute, and an own goal from Julie Johnston halved the American lead, but Tobin Heath put the final touch on the United States' third Women's World Cup victory.

=== Asian domination and brief decline (2016–2022) ===
==== 2018 AFC Women's Asian Cup ====
Defending champions Japan won in 2014 and played in the continental competition held in Jordan in a group with then-runners-up Australia, South Korea and Vietnam. In Group C, Nadeshiko beat the Vietnamese 4-0 and drew the following two games against the South Koreans and the Australians. As Japan, Australia and South Korea each finished with 5 points, the tiebreaker was goal difference and the Japanese finished second behind Australia (the goal difference was also decisive for Japan to secure a direct spot in the 2019 FIFA Women's World Cup over South Korea).

In the semi-finals, Japan defeated again China by 3–1 with a goal from Mana Iwabuchi and two goals from Kumi Yokoyama. The final match in Amman was a repeat of the 2014 final between Japan and Australia, in which Nadeshiko defeated the Matildas again thanks to a goal scored by Yokoyama in the 84th minute. It was Japan's second continental title and their second title in a row.

==== 2019 World Cup ====
While Japan remains on a title and a runners-up spot at the last two editions of the World Cup as well as a runner-up spot at the 2012 Olympics, it failed to qualify for the 2016 Olympics while the World Cup 2019 sees the country of the Rising Sun being knocked out pretty quickly. Nadeshiko Japan, who no longer benefit from the surprise effect unlike previous tournaments, passed the first round without glory, with a narrow victory over Scotland (2–1) a goalless draw against Argentina (0–0) as well as a defeat against England (0–2) in the last group match for first place in group D. The Japanese find the Netherlands at the same stage of the competition as 4 years earlier, but the confrontation this time turns to the advantage of the Oranje who take their revenge and eliminated Japan by the same score by which they had lost in 2015 (1–2).

==== Olympic Games in 2021 at home ====
Japan is encountering the same difficulties during the 2020 Olympic Games organized at home and postponed by a year due to the COVID-19 pandemic. In front of their public, Japan passed the first round with difficulty, with a victory snatched in extremis on the edge of the last quarter of an hour of the game on the last day against Chile (1–0) to finish among the 2 best 3rd in the group, having had a few scares with a header from the Chilean Francisca Lara having rebounded on the goal line without crossing it just after hitting the bar, and this shortly before the saving Japanese goal. Japan, which had in the meantime struggled against the other top names in the group (1–1 draw against Canada after being behind and missing a penalty, 0–1 defeat against Great Britain), confirms its difficulties against to the big teams like this first round and the 2019 World Cup by falling in the next round against Sweden (1–3).

==== 2022 AFC Women's Asian Cup ====
Still suffering from the effects of the COVID-19 pandemic, Japan was seeking its third consecutive continental title in India. In the first phase, Nadeshiko beat Myanmar (5-0) and Vietnam (3-0) and drew 1-1 with South Korea, finishing first in the group.

In the quarterfinals, they secured a direct spot in the 2023 FIFA Women's World Cup by beating Thailand 7-0. However, their dream of a third consecutive championship ended when they were defeated by China in the semifinals on penalties by 4-3 after a 2-2 draw that lasted until 120 minutes of extra time.

=== The new era (2023–2024) ===
==== 2023 World Cup ====
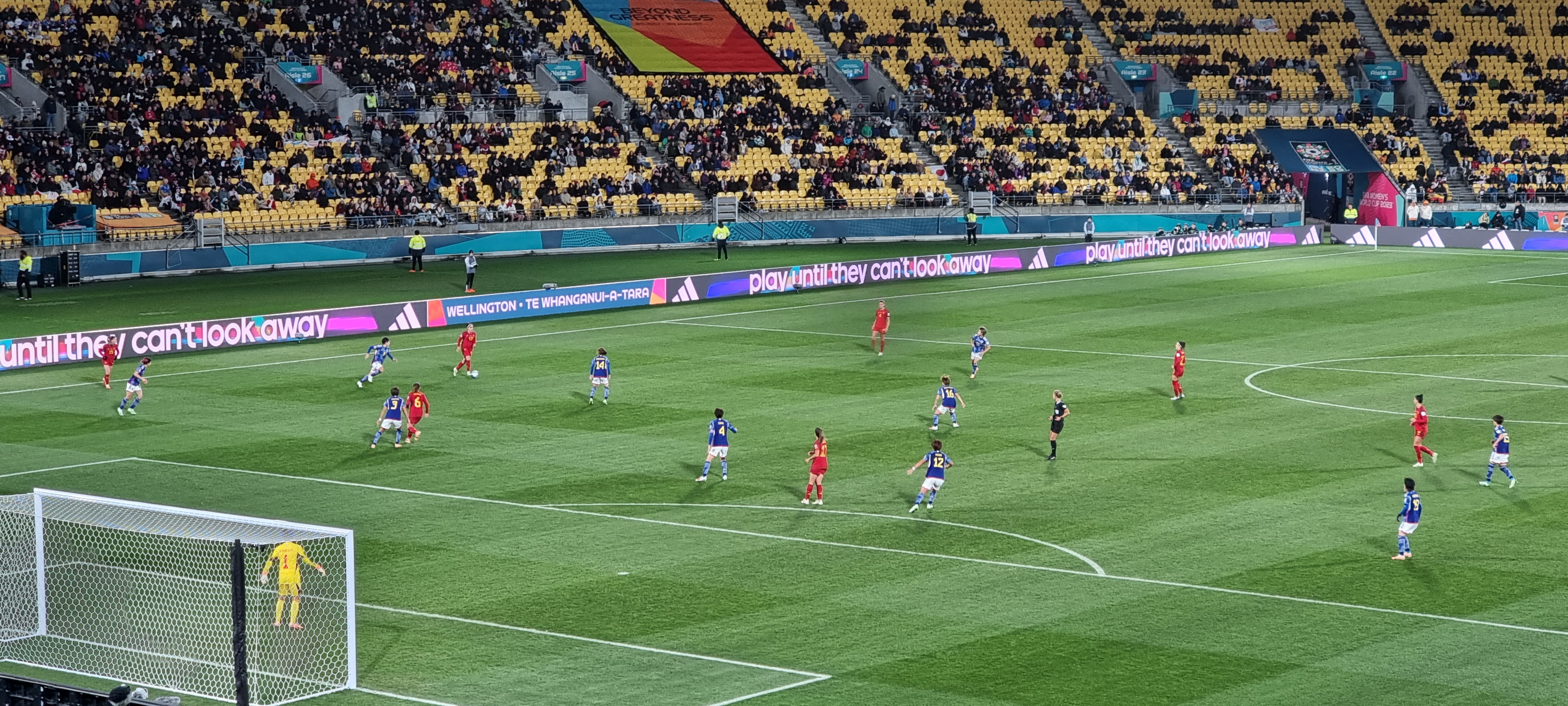
Japan playing against Spain at the 2023 FIFA Women's World Cup in Wellington, New Zealand

Japan finished first in Group C with Spain, Zambia and Costa Rica, winning all three group games, scoring 11 goals and conceded none. Japan's technical mastery made a strong impression in particular in her 4–0 victory against Spain, the eventual champion. That was a landmark match that broke long-held FIFA records. Japan women's 23% of possession is the lowest for a winning side at the FIFA Women's World Cup since 2011. This is often compared to Japan 2-1 Spain in 2022 FIFA World Cup Group E, which Japan's 18% of possession is the lowest for a winning side at the FIFA World Cup since 1966. Match statistics reflected Japan women was more incisive and efficient, with only 23% possession, their expected goal (xG) was 0.9 vs 0.7, shots attempted were 7 vs 10, shots on target were 5 vs 2, and goals scored were 4 vs 0.

In the knockout stage, Japan was able to beat Norway 3–1 and advanced to the quarter-finals for the first time since 2015. Facing Sweden, another Scandinavian in the quarter-finals, Japan was hailed as favorite due to their four consecutive wins at this World Cup, but, unfortunately for the Nadeshiko, they were unable to create as many chances as they did against Norway. Japan found themselves trailing by 2 goals to nothing at halftime, and Honoka Hayashi's goal in the 87th minute ended as the only effort Japan could effectively turn into a goal. Losing by 2–1, they were eliminated from the World Cup, and the second time in succession that Japan fell to Sweden in a major competition, as they were also eliminated at the quarter-finals of the Tokyo Olympics just two years prior, on 2021.

==== 2024 Summer Olympics ====
After eliminating North Korea in the third round of the 2024 AFC Women's Olympic Qualifying Tournament, the Nadeshiko Japan returned to qualify for an Olympic Games for the first time since London 2012 (they failed to qualify for the Rio 2016 Games). In the first match against Spain, they opened the score with a beautiful free-kick shoot from Aoba Fujino, but the Spanish came back by winning 2-1 with the goals of Aitana Bonmatí and Mariona Caldentey. Against Brazil in the second match, the Nadeshiko was losing the match by 1-0 until the final stoppage time when a penalty kick of Saki Kumagai and a 40-meter goal shot from Momoko Tanikawa turned the match around and prevented Japan from being eliminated in the group stage until then.

In the last match of the group phase against Nigeria, the Japanese qualified to the quarter-finals winning the Nigerians by 3-1 with goals from Maika Hamano, Mina Tanaka and a free-kick from Hikaru Kitagawa. Although they made a great match against United States in the quarter-finals, Japan was eliminated losing to the Americans by 1-0 due to a goal of Trinity Rodman in extra time. At the end, Nadeshiko Japan end the Paris campaign in the fifth place, the best of the non-semifinalists.

=== Nils Nielsen era (2025–2026) ===
In mid-December 2024, JFA head coach Futoshi Ikeda stepped down, and Greenland-born Danish coach Nils Nielsen took over as head coach for the Nadeshikos. Nielsen also brought in Australian U-20 coach Leah Blayney as one of the assistant managers of the JFA. His style of play included bringing out the ruthlessness needed from the Japanese to win games.

==== 2025 SheBelieves Cup and first title won ====
Japan was invited alongside Australia and Colombia to the 2025 SheBelievesCup in the United States. As the tournament reverted back to the round-robin style format, the top-placed team was the winner. Japan started against Australia and easily dominated the game with a 4-0 thrashing of the Matildas with goals by Mina Tanaka (2), Maika Hamano, and Moeka Minami. Japan went on to win against Colombia 4-1 with an instant super goal from Momoko Tanikawa eighteen seconds into the game. Mina Tanaka then scored the second from a corner kick by Tanikawa. Japan conceded from a counterattack by the Colombians, however in the second half, a goal from Maika Hamano and a penalty kick finished by Mina Tanaka sealed it for the Nadeshikos.

Japan headed into the final game of the tournament with the United States. With their goal difference higher than the Americans, a draw was needed for them to win the competition. One minute into the game, Yuka Momiki scored the first goal, however in the 14th minute, Ally Sentnor scored the equalizer which leveled the game. After half-time, Aoba Fujino won a foul outside the American box, and Yui Hasegawa took the subsequent free kick, which the American goalkeeper initially saved, but then Toko Koga followed up and puts the loose ball into the net. Nielsen's Japan sees out the game with the win, lifting their first SheBelieves Cup trophy. They defeated the United States for the first time since 2013 Algarve Cup, and ended their 22-game unbeaten run.

=== Mid-year drop of form ===
==== First set of international friendlies ====
Fresh from their SheBelievesCup win, Japan faced against Colombia in two back-to-back games, drawing against them 1-1 in the first, and then winning against them in an unofficial match 6-1. However, their form started to drop when they lost two back-to-back matches against Brazil, whose pace and power dominated the Japanese. They also played a send-off game against Spain for the 2025 UEFA Women's Euros, where despite Mina Tanaka scoring the opening goal, the Spanish turned the game around, with the final score being 1-3 to Spain.

==== 2025 EAFF E-1 Women's Football Championship ====
With the EAFF E-1 Football Championship upcoming, Japan fielded a rotated squad of entirely WE League players. They easily win against Chinese Taipei 4-0, before suffering two consecutive draws against China and South Korea 1-1 and 0-0 respectively. Despite Japan having a higher goal difference than the other teams, they ended up in third place, since they had lower head-to-head goals than China and South Korea.

==== Last four friendlies ====
In October Japan played two friendlies against European opposition namely Italy and Norway. They were behind Italy after half-time, but Yui Hasegawa scored a chip which ties the game and eventually the game ended 1-1. Against Norway, they lost 2-0 with Norway's Signe Gaupset scoring a brace.

Japan ended their winless drought against Canada in two back-to-back games, which saw them win 3-0 and 1-0 in both of those games.

==== 2026 AFC Women's Asian Cup ====
Finishing top three in the previous tournament, Japan automatically qualified for the 2026 AFC Women's Asian Cup which took place in Australia as the favorites to win the title and was placed in a relatively easy Group C along with Chinese Taipei, India and Vietnam. They beat Taiwan 2–0 in their game, as their opponents played with a very low block which the Japanese broke through in the 61st minute with a goal from Momoko Tanikawa and another one later by Kiko Seike. In their next game, the Nadeshikos dismantle India, putting eleven past the net, which was the match with the most goals scored in the tournament including hat-tricks from Riko Ueki and Hinata Miyazawa. Their final group stage game against Vietnam had them cruise to a 4–0 victory, topping their group and sending them to the quarter-finals.

In the quarter-finals, Japan eliminated the Philippines with a dominating 7–0 victory, automatically booking their ticket to the 2027 FIFA Women's World Cup. Japan advanced to the semi-finals against South Korea, where they won 4–1 and conceded their first and only goal of the tournament.

Japan faced off against Australia in the final, whose team eliminated North Korea and then previous champions China from the tournament. In front of a record crowd of mainly Australian fans, the Japanese scored the only goal of the match with a shot outside of the box from Maika Hamano. After a cagey battle and repelling a last-ditch Australian attack in the last minutes, Japan lived up to the expectations and reclaimed their title, winning their third continental trophy. They were by all means the best team of the tournament, with 29 goals scored across all six games, six wins and five clean sheets.

== Team image ==
=== Nicknames ===
The Japan women's national football team has been known or nicknamed as the "Nadeshiko Japan". The word Nadeshiko has several meanings.

The term “Yamato nadeshiko” (which came the expression) was an old expression often used to describe the traditional Japanese woman as a woman who was beautiful and delicate on the outside but strong and determined on the inside, although she was often submissive to men. In fact, the word Yamato is the name given to the race and ethnicity of people from which Japan was formed (as it is also the name of the Japanese imperial dynasty that rules the country to this day). In modern times, the term “Yamato Nadeshiko” has been updated to mean “a modest woman” who is both strong, mature and determined, as well as beautiful, delicate and graceful.

The nickname was coined by the Japan Football Association in 2004 after a fan vote during the Athens 2004 Olympic Games, which was intended to convey that the Japanese female player was strong and brave like an athlete, feminine like a woman and Japanese with both a patriotic and nationalistic character. At first, it was not widely accepted by the public and the media until the 2011 Women’s World Cup. After the 2011 World Cup title, the expression Nadeshiko completely changed to “the female football player from Japan”.

=== Home stadium ===
Japan play its home matches among various stadiums, in rotation, around the country.

=== Rivalries ===
==== China ====
In the 1970s, Nadeshiko Japan and China’s Steel Roses became the first Asian continental powerhouses in women's football. While the Steel Roses dominated in the 1980s, 1990s, and 2000s, Nadeshiko Japan began dominating the rivalry in the early 2010s. It is the biggest women's football rivalry in Asia.

==== Australia ====
Although the first match between both national teams started in 1984, since the Australians came to AFC in 2006 both Nadeshiko Japan and the Matildas created the most significant women's football rivalry in Asia with a lot of AFC Women's Asian Cup title matches and a FIFA Women's World Cup quarterfinal.

==== North Korea ====
Another big rival of Nadeshiko Japan, the Azaleas from North Korea created this rivalry at the same time than the rivalry of Japan with China. Although the North Koreans don't play a lot of recently matches against the Japanese in professional terms, in the U-20 and U-17 competitions is the biggest rivalry of the continent.

==== South Korea ====
Unlike men's football, the rivalry between Japan and South Korea in women's football is still recent (created in the 1990s). But it's not a rivalry below due to the history of the two countries.

==== United States ====
Outside Asia, the biggest rival of Nadeshiko Japan is United States. Both teams created the rivalry in the 1980s and both teams have always faced each other in decisive instances, including two consecutive FIFA Women's World Cup finals recently in 2011 and 2015.

== Overall competitive record ==
- All results list Japan goal tally first.
- Goal scorers are sorted alphabetically.
- Colors gold, silver, and bronze indicate first-, second-, and third-place finishes.

=== Overall record ===
Competition	Stage	Result	Opponent	Position	Scorers
(Hong Kong) 1981 Asian Championship	Round 1	0–1	Chinese Taipei	3 / 4	
(Hong Kong) 1981 Asian Championship	Round 1	0–2	Thailand	3 / 4	
(Hong Kong) 1981 Asian Championship	Round 1	1–0	Indonesia	3 / 4	Handa
(Hong Kong) 1986 Asian Championship	Round 1	0–2	China	2 / 3	
(Hong Kong) 1986 Asian Championship	Round 1	10–0	Malaysia	2 / 3	Takakura (2), Nagamine (4), Kioka (2), Tezuka, Matsuda
(Hong Kong) 1986 Asian Championship	Semifinals	4–0	Thailand		Kioka, Nagamine, Noda, Matsuda
(Hong Kong) 1986 Asian Championship	Final	0–2	China		
(Hong Kong) 1989 Asian Championship	Round 1	3–0	Hong Kong	1 / 4	
(Hong Kong) 1989 Asian Championship	Round 1	11–0	Indonesia	1 / 4	
(Hong Kong) 1989 Asian Championship	Round 1	14–0	Nepal	1 / 4	
(Hong Kong) 1989 Asian Championship	Semifinals	0–1	Chinese Taipei		
(Hong Kong) 1989 Asian Championship	Third place	9–0	Hong Kong		
(China) 1990 Asian Games	Main Round	0–5	China		
(China) 1990 Asian Games	Main Round	5–0	Hong Kong		
(China) 1990 Asian Games	Main Round	8–1	South Korea		
(China) 1990 Asian Games	Main Round	1–1	North Korea		
(China) 1990 Asian Games	Main Round	3–1	Chinese Taipei	2 / 6	
(Hong Kong) 1991 Asian Championship	Round 1	1–0	North Korea	1 / 5	
(Hong Kong) 1991 Asian Championship	Round 1	4–1	Hong Kong	1 / 5	
(Hong Kong) 1991 Asian Championship	Round 1	12–0	Malaysia	1 / 5	
(Hong Kong) 1991 Asian Championship	Round 1	12–0	Singapore	1 / 5	
(Hong Kong) 1991 Asian Championship	Semifinals	0–0 (PSO: 5–4)	Chinese Taipei		
(Hong Kong) 1991 Asian Championship	Final	0–5	China		
(China) 1991 World Cup	Round 1	0–1	Brazil	4 / 4	
(China) 1991 World Cup	Round 1	0–8	Sweden	4 / 4	
(China) 1991 World Cup	Round 1	0–3	United States	4 / 4	
(Malaysia) 1993 Asian Championship	Round 1	6–1	Chinese Taipei	1 / 4	
(Malaysia) 1993 Asian Championship	Round 1	15–0	Philippines	1 / 4	
(Malaysia) 1993 Asian Championship	Round 1	4–0	Hong Kong	1 / 4	
(Malaysia) 1993 Asian Championship	Semifinals	1–3	China		
(Malaysia) 1993 Asian Championship	Final	3–0	Chinese Taipei		
(China) 1994 Asian Games	Round 1	1–1	China	2 / 4	
(China) 1994 Asian Games	Round 1	3–0	Chinese Taipei	2 / 4	
(China) 1994 Asian Games	Round 1	5–0	South Korea	2 / 4	
(China) 1994 Asian Games	Final	0–2	China		
(Sweden) 1995 World Cup	Round 1	0–1	Germany	3 / 4	
(Sweden) 1995 World Cup	Round 1	2–1	Brazil	3 / 4	
(Sweden) 1995 World Cup	Round 1	0–2	Sweden	3 / 4	
(Sweden) 1995 World Cup	Quarterfinals	0–4	United States		
(Malaysia) 1995 Asian Championship	Round 1	1–0	South Korea	1 / 4	
(Malaysia) 1995 Asian Championship	Round 1	6–0	India	1 / 4	
(Malaysia) 1995 Asian Championship	Round 1	17–0	Uzbekistan	1 / 4	
(Malaysia) 1995 Asian Championship	Semifinals	3–0	Chinese Taipei		
(Malaysia) 1995 Asian Championship	Final	0–2	China		
(United States) 1996 Summer Olympics	Round 1	2–3	Germany	4 / 4	
(United States) 1996 Summer Olympics	Round 1	0–2	Brazil	4 / 4	
(United States) 1996 Summer Olympics	Round 1	0–4	Norway	4 / 4	
(China) 1997 Asian Championship	Round 1	21–0	Guam	1 / 4	
(China) 1997 Asian Championship	Round 1	1–0	India	1 / 4	
(China) 1997 Asian Championship	Round 1	9–0	Hong Kong	1 / 4	
(China) 1997 Asian Championship	Semifinals	0–1	North Korea		
(China) 1997 Asian Championship	Third place	2–0	Chinese Taipei		
(China) 1998 Asian Games	Round 1	6–0	Thailand	2 / 4	
(China) 1998 Asian Games	Round 1	2–3	North Korea	2 / 4	
(China) 1998 Asian Games	Round 1	8–0	Vietnam	2 / 4	
(China) 1998 Asian Games	Semifinals	0–3	China		
(China) 1998 Asian Games	Third place	2–1	Chinese Taipei		
(United States) 1999 World Cup	Round 1	1–1	Canada	4 / 4	
(United States) 1999 World Cup	Round 1	0–5	Russia	4 / 4	
(United States) 1999 World Cup	Round 1	0–4	Norway	4 / 4	
(Philippines) 1999 Asian Championship	Round 1	9–0	Thailand	1 / 5	
(Philippines) 1999 Asian Championship	Round 1	5–1	Uzbekistan	1 / 5	
(Philippines) 1999 Asian Championship	Round 1	14–0	Nepal	1 / 5	
(Philippines) 1999 Asian Championship	Round 1	6–0	Philippines	1 / 5	
(Philippines) 1999 Asian Championship	Semifinals	0–2	Chinese Taipei		
(Philippines) 1999 Asian Championship	Third place	2–3	North Korea		
(Chinese Taipei) 2001 Asian Championship	Round 1	14–0	Singapore	2 / 5	
(Chinese Taipei) 2001 Asian Championship	Round 1	11–0	Guam	2 / 5	
(Chinese Taipei) 2001 Asian Championship	Round 1	0–1	North Korea	2 / 5	
(Chinese Taipei) 2001 Asian Championship	Round 1	3–1	Vietnam	2 / 5	
(Chinese Taipei) 2001 Asian Championship	Semifinals	2–1	South Korea		
(Chinese Taipei) 2001 Asian Championship	Final	0–2	North Korea		
(Chinese Taipei) 2002 Asian Games	Main round	0–1	North Korea		
(Chinese Taipei) 2002 Asian Games	Main round	3–0	Vietnam		
(Chinese Taipei) 2002 Asian Games	Main round	1–0	South Korea		
(Chinese Taipei) 2002 Asian Games	Main round	2–2	China		
(Chinese Taipei) 2002 Asian Games	Main round	2–0	Chinese Taipei	3 / 6	
(Thailand) 2003 Asian Championship	Round 1	15–0	Philippines	1 / 5	
(Thailand) 2003 Asian Championship	Round 1	7–0	Guam	1 / 5	
(Thailand) 2003 Asian Championship	Round 1	7–0	Myanmar	1 / 5	
(Thailand) 2003 Asian Championship	Round 1	5–0	Chinese Taipei	1 / 5	
(Thailand) 2003 Asian Championship	Semifinals	0–3	North Korea		
(Thailand) 2003 Asian Championship	Third place	0–1	South Korea		
(United States) 2003 World Cup	Round 1	6–0	Argentina	3 / 4	
(United States) 2003 World Cup	Round 1	0–3	Germany	3 / 4	
(United States) 2003 World Cup	Round 1	1–3	Canada	3 / 4	
(Greece) 2004 Summer Olympics	Round 1	1–0	Sweden	3 / 3	
(Greece) 2004 Summer Olympics	Round 1	0–1	Nigeria	3 / 3	
(Greece) 2004 Summer Olympics	Quarterfinals	1–2	United States		Awarded the Fair Play Award
(South Korea) 2005 East Asian Championship	Main Round	0–1	North Korea		
(South Korea) 2005 East Asian Championship	Main Round	0–0	China		
(South Korea) 2005 East Asian Championship	Main Round	0–0	South Korea	3 / 4	Awarded the Fair Play Award
(Qatar) 2006 Asian Games	Round 1	13–0	Jordan	1 / 4	
(Qatar) 2006 Asian Games	Round 1	4–0	Thailand	1 / 4	
(Qatar) 2006 Asian Games	Round 1	1–0	China	1 / 4	
(Qatar) 2006 Asian Games	Semifinals	3–1	South Korea		
(Qatar) 2006 Asian Games	Final	0–0 (PSO: 2–4)	(North Korea) South Korea		
(Australia) 2006 Asian Championship	Round 1	5–0	Vietnam	1 / 4	
(Australia) 2006 Asian Championship	Round 1	11–1	Chinese Taipei	1 / 4	
(Australia) 2006 Asian Championship	Round 1	1–0	China	1 / 4	
(Australia) 2006 Asian Championship	Semifinals	0–2	Australia		
(Australia) 2006 Asian Championship	Third place	2–3	North Korea		
(China) 2007 World Cup	Round 1	2–2	England	3 / 4	
(China) 2007 World Cup	Round 1	1–0	Argentina	3 / 4	
(China) 2007 World Cup	Round 1	0–2	Germany	3 / 4	
(China) 2008 East Asian Championship	Main Round	3–2	North Korea		
(China) 2008 East Asian Championship	Main Round	2–0	South Korea		
(China) 2008 East Asian Championship	Main Round	3–0	China	1 / 4	
(Vietnam) 2008 Asian Cup	Round 1	1–3	South Korea	1 / 4	
(Vietnam) 2008 Asian Cup	Round 1	11–0	Chinese Taipei	1 / 4	
(Vietnam) 2008 Asian Cup	Round 1	3–1	Australia	1 / 4	
(Vietnam) 2008 Asian Cup	Semifinals	1–3	China		
(Vietnam) 2008 Asian Cup	Third place	3–0	Australia		
2008 Summer Olympics qualification	Final round	2–0	Vietnam	1 / 4	
2008 Summer Olympics qualification	Final round	4–0	Thailand	1 / 4	
2008 Summer Olympics qualification	Final round	6–1	South Korea	1 / 4	
(China) 2008 Summer Olympics	Round 1	2–2	New Zealand	3 / 4	
(China) 2008 Summer Olympics	Round 1	0–1	United States	3 / 4	
(China) 2008 Summer Olympics	Round 1	5–1	Norway	3 / 4	
(China) 2008 Summer Olympics	Quarterfinals	2–0	China		
(China) 2008 Summer Olympics	Semifinals	2–4	United States		
(China) 2008 Summer Olympics	Third place	0–2	Germany		
(Japan) 2010 East Asian Championship	Round 1	2–0	China		
(Japan) 2010 East Asian Championship	Round 1	3–0	Chinese Taipei		
(Japan) 2010 East Asian Championship	Round 1	2–1	South Korea	1 / 4	
(China) 2010 Asian Cup	Round 1	8–0	Myanmar	1 / 4	
(China) 2010 Asian Cup	Round 1	4–0	Thailand	1 / 4	
(China) 2010 Asian Cup	Round 1	2–1	North Korea	1 / 4	
(China) 2010 Asian Cup	Semifinals	0–1	Australia		
(China) 2010 Asian Cup	Third place	2–0	China		
(China) 2010 Asian Games	Round 1	4–0	Thailand	1 / 3	
(China) 2010 Asian Games	Round 1	0–0	North Korea	1 / 3	
(China) 2010 Asian Games	Semifinals	1–0	China		
(China) 2010 Asian Games	Final	1–0	North Korea		
(Germany) 2011 World Cup	Round 1	2–1	New Zealand	2 / 4	
(Germany) 2011 World Cup		4–0	Mexico	2 / 4	
(Germany) 2011 World Cup		0–2	England	2 / 4	
(Germany) 2011 World Cup	Quarterfinals	1–0	Germany		
(Germany) 2011 World Cup	Semifinals	3–1	Sweden		
(Germany) 2011 World Cup	Final	2–2 (PSO: 3–1)	United States		Awarded the Fair Play Award
2012 Summer Olympics qualification	Final round	3–0	Thailand		
2012 Summer Olympics qualification	Final round	2–1	South Korea		
2012 Summer Olympics qualification	Final round	1–0	Australia		
2012 Summer Olympics qualification	Final round	1–1	North Korea		
2012 Summer Olympics qualification	Final round	1–0	China		
(United Kingdom) 2012 Summer Olympics	Round 1	2–1	Canada	2 / 4	
(United Kingdom) 2012 Summer Olympics	Round 1	0–0	Sweden	2 / 4	
(United Kingdom) 2012 Summer Olympics	Round 1	0–0	South Africa	2 / 4	
(United Kingdom) 2012 Summer Olympics	Quarterfinals	2–0	Brazil		
(United Kingdom) 2012 Summer Olympics	Semifinals	2–1	France		
(United Kingdom) 2012 Summer Olympics	Finals	1–2	United States		
(South Korea) 2013 EAFF Women's East Asian Cup	Final round	2–0	China		
(South Korea) 2013 EAFF Women's East Asian Cup	Final round	0–0	North Korea		
(South Korea) 2013 EAFF Women's East Asian Cup	Final round	1–2	South Korea		
(Vietnam) 2014 AFC Women's Asian Cup	Round 1	2–2	Australia	1 / 4	
(Vietnam) 2014 AFC Women's Asian Cup		4–0	Vietnam	1 / 4	
(Vietnam) 2014 AFC Women's Asian Cup		7–0	Jordan	1 / 4	
(Vietnam) 2014 AFC Women's Asian Cup	Semifinals	2–1	China PR		
(Vietnam) 2014 AFC Women's Asian Cup	Final	1–0	Australia		Awarded the Fair Play Award
(Canada) 2015 World Cup	Round 1	1–0	Switzerland	1 / 4	
(Canada) 2015 World Cup	Round 1	2–1	Cameroon	1 / 4	
(Canada) 2015 World Cup	Round 1	1–0	Ecuador	1 / 4	
(Canada) 2015 World Cup	Round of 16	2–1	Netherlands		
(Canada) 2015 World Cup	Quarterfinals	1–0	Australia		
(Canada) 2015 World Cup	Semifinals	2–1	England		
(Canada) 2015 World Cup	Final	2–5	United States		
(Jordan) 2018 AFC Women's Asian Cup	Round 1	4–0	Vietnam	2 / 4	
(Jordan) 2018 AFC Women's Asian Cup	Round 1	0–0	South Korea	2 / 4	
(Jordan) 2018 AFC Women's Asian Cup	Round 1	1–1	Australia	2 / 4	
(Jordan) 2018 AFC Women's Asian Cup	Semi-finals	3–1	China		
(Jordan) 2018 AFC Women's Asian Cup	Final	1–0	Australia		Awarded the Fair Play Award
(Indonesia) 2018 Asian Games	Round 1	2–0	Thailand	1 / 3	
(Indonesia) 2018 Asian Games	Round 1	7–0	Vietnam	1 / 3	
(Indonesia) 2018 Asian Games	Quarter-finals	2–1	North Korea		
(Indonesia) 2018 Asian Games	Semi-finals	2–1	South Korea		
(Indonesia) 2018 Asian Games	Final	1–0	China		
(France) 2019 World Cup	Round 1	0–0	Argentina	2 / 4	
(France) 2019 World Cup	Round 1	2–1	Scotland	2 / 4	
(France) 2019 World Cup	Round 1	0–2	England	2 / 4	
(France) 2019 World Cup	Round of 16	1–2	Netherlands		
(Japan) 2020 Summer Olympics	Round 1	1–1	Canada	3 / 4	
(Japan) 2020 Summer Olympics	Round 1	0–1	(United Kingdom) Great Britain	3 / 4	
(Japan) 2020 Summer Olympics	Round 1	1–0	Chile	3 / 4	
(Japan) 2020 Summer Olympics	Quarterfinals	1–3	Sweden		
(India) 2022 AFC Women's Asian Cup	Round 1	5–0	Myanmar	1 / 4	
(India) 2022 AFC Women's Asian Cup	Round 1	3–0	Vietnam	1 / 4	
(India) 2022 AFC Women's Asian Cup	Round 1	1–1	South Korea	1 / 4	
(India) 2022 AFC Women's Asian Cup	Quarterfinals	7–0	Thailand		
(India) 2022 AFC Women's Asian Cup	Semifinals	2–2 (PSO: 3–4)	China		
(Japan) 2022 EAFF E-1 Football Championship (women)	Final round	2–1	South Korea		
(Japan) 2022 EAFF E-1 Football Championship (women)	Final round	4–1	Chinese Taipei		
(Japan) 2022 EAFF E-1 Football Championship (women)	Final round	0–0	China	1 / 4	

== Results and fixtures ==
The following is a list of match results in the last 12 months, as well as any future matches that have been scheduled.

Legend

Win Draw Loss Fixture Void or Postponed

=== 2025 ===
29 November MS&AD Cup	Japan	3–0	Canada	Nagasaki, Japan
15:30 UTC+9	Tanikawa 43'; Tanaka 51'; Fujino 68'	Report		Stadium: Peace Stadium

2 December Friendly	Japan	1–0	Canada	Isahaya, Japan
	Tanaka 45'	Report		Stadium: Transcosmos Stadium Nagasaki

- Fixtures and Results (2025) – JFA.jp

=== 2026 ===
4 March AFC Women's Asian Cup GS	Japan	2–0	Chinese Taipei	Perth, Australia
13:00 UTC+8	Tanikawa 61'; Seike 90+2'	Report (AFC); Report (FIFA)		Stadium: Perth Rectangular Stadium; Referee: Oh Hyeon-jeong (South Korea)

7 March AFC Women's Asian Cup GS	India	0–11	Japan	Perth, Australia
16:30 (IST)		Report (AFC); Report (FIFA)	Yamamoto 4'; Hasegawa 13'; Miyazawa 20', 35', 81'; Seike 45+5', 55'; Ueki 47', 50', 65'; Hijikata 62'	Stadium: Perth Rectangular Stadium; Attendance: 3,233; Referee: Veronika Bernatskaia (Kyrgyzstan)

10 March AFC Women's Asian Cup GS	Japan	4–0	Vietnam	Perth, Australia
17:00 UTC+8	Ueki 21'; Hamano 51'; Fujino 64'; Seike 67'	Report (AFC); Report (FIFA)		Stadium: HBF Park; Referee: Kim Yu-jeong (South Korea)

15 March AFC Women's Asian Cup QF	Japan	7–0	Philippines	Sydney, Australia
16:00 UTC+11	Tanaka 45'; Koga 45+3', 76'; Chiba 65'; Matsukubo 67'; Tanikawa 86'; Ueki 90'	Report (AFC); Report (FIFA)		Stadium: Stadium Australia; Referee: Dong Fangyu (China)

18 March AFC Women's Asian Cup SF	South Korea	1–4	Japan	Sydney, Australia
20:00 UTC+11	Kang Chae-rim 78'	Report (AFC); Report (FIFA)	Ueki 15'; Hamano 25'; Kumagai 75'; Chiba 81'	Stadium: Stadium Australia; Attendance: 17,367; Referee: Veronika Bernatskaia (Kyrgyzstan)

21 March AFC Women's Asian Cup F	Japan	1–0	Australia	Sydney, Australia
20:00 UTC+11	Hamano 17'	Report (AFC); Report (FIFA)		Stadium: Stadium Australia; Attendance: 74,397; Referee: Kim Yu-jeong (South Korea)

11 April Friendly	United States	2–1	Japan	San Jose, United States
17:30 ET	Lavelle 9'; Heaps 48'	Report	Ueki 61'	Stadium: PayPal Park; Attendance: 17,435; Referee: Karen Andrade (Mexico)

14 April Friendly	United States	0–1	Japan	Seattle, United States
22:00 ET		Report	Hamano 27'	Stadium: Lumen Field; Attendance: 36,128; Referee: Janeishka Caban (Puerto Rico)

17 April Friendly	United States	3–0	Japan	Commerce City, United States
21:00 ET	Girma 47'; Lavelle 56'; Wesley 64'	Report		Stadium: Dick's Sporting Goods Park; Attendance: 17,589; Referee: Myriam Marcotte (Canada)

6 June Friendly	Japan	5–0	South Africa	Osaka, Japan
15:50 UTC+9	Seike 1', 19'; Tanikawa 29'; Fujino 49', 60'	Report		Stadium: Yodoko Sakura Stadium; Attendance: 8,755; Referee: Wang Choki Christie (Hong Kong)

9 June Friendly	Japan	0–1	South Africa	Osaka, Japan
15:30 UTC+9			Motlhalo 9'	Stadium: Natural Grass Main Field S1; Referee: Om Choki (Bhutan)

14 September Asian Games GS	Japan	8–0	Thailand	Fukuroi, Japan
	Nakashima 3', 37', 41'; Kamiya 30'; Takarada 70', 74', 79'; Sakakibara 88'	Report		Stadium: Shizuoka Stadium ECOPA; Attendance: 1,202; Referee: Nurul Ain Izatty Zainal (Malaysia)

17 September Asian Games GS	Vietnam	0–8	Japan	Fukuroi, Japan
19:30 UTC+9		Report	Kamiya 12', 52'; Shiokoshi 19'; Cù Thị Huỳnh Như 43' (o.g.); Hamada 45+3'; Nishio 78'; Narumiya 81'; Yumura 90+2'	Stadium: Shizuoka Stadium ECOPA; Attendance: 1,029; Referee: Esra'a Al-Mbaiden (Jordan)

21 September Asian Games GS	Japan	4–0	Chinese Taipei	Fukuroi, Japan
19:30 UTC+9	Takarada 7' (pen.); Kamiya 20'; Ueno 51'; Ikuta 58'	Report		Stadium: Shizuoka Stadium ECOPA; Attendance: 3,679; Referee: Khin Nyein Chan (Myanmar)

25 September Asian Games QF	Japan	4–0	Philippines	Fukuroi, Japan
19:30 UTC+9	Takarada 2', 36'; Ueno 26'; Kamiya 45+2'	Report		Stadium: Shizuoka Stadium ECOPA; Attendance: 1,084; Referee: Esra'a Al-Mbaiden (Jordan)

29 September Asian Games SF	Japan	2–0	South Korea	Fukuroi, Japan
19:30 UTC+9	Kamiya 54', 63'	Report		Stadium: Shizuoka Stadium ECOPA; Attendance: 998; Referee: Lê Thị Ly (Vietnam)

2 October Asian Games F	North Korea	2–2 (a.e.t.) (3–5 p)	Japan	Fukuroi, Japan
19:30 UTC+9	Jong Kum 47'; Jon Ryong-jong 69'	Report	Ueno 32'; Nishio 86'	Stadium: Shizuoka Stadium ECOPA; Attendance: 6,243; Referee: Supiree Testhomya (Thailand)
	Penalties
	Myong Yu-jong (penalty scored); Jon Ryong-jong (penalty scored); Jong Kum (penalty missed); Ri Hye-gyong (penalty scored)		(penalty scored) Takarada; (penalty scored) Mizuno; (penalty scored) Kuwahara; (penalty scored) Nishio; (penalty scored) Shiokoshi

9 October Friendly	Haiti	1–5	Japan	Saint-Ouen-sur-Seine, France
20:00 UTC+1	B. Louis 45+3'	Source	Seike 26'; Hamano 33'; Hasegawa 38'; Chiba 57'; Hijikata 81'	Stadium: Stade Bauer

13 October Friendly	Germany	2–1	Japan	Bremen, Germany
17:45	Dallmann 28'; Bühl 73'	Report	Tanikawa 15'	Stadium: Weserstadion; Attendance: 26,574; Referee: Karoline Marie Jensen (Norway)

29 November Friendly	Japan	v	Brazil	Hiroshima, Japan
		Report		Stadium: Edion Peace Wing Hiroshima

5 December Friendly	Japan	v	Brazil	Okayama, Japan
		Report		Stadium: JFE Harenokuni Stadium

=== 2027 ===
19 April 2028 Olympic Qualifiers	Japan	v	Uzbekistan	Japan
		Report

24 April 2028 Olympic Qualifiers	Australia	v	Japan	Australia
		Report

June 2027 World Cup GS	Japan	v	TBD	Brazil

June/July 2027 World Cup GS	Japan	v	TBD	Brazil

July 2027 World Cup GS	Japan	v	TBD	Brazil

7 October 2028 Olympic Qualifiers	Japan	v	Chinese Taipei	Japan
		Report

12 October 2028 Olympic Qualifiers	Chinese Taipei	v	Japan	Taiwan
		Report

29 November 2028 Olympic Qualifiers	Uzbekistan	v	Japan	Uzbekistan
		Report

4 December 2028 Olympic Qualifiers	Japan	v	Australia	Japan
		Report

- Fixtures and Results (2026) – JFA.jp

== All-time results ==
As of 2 June 2025, after the match against Brazil.

Results by year						FIFA ranking by year				
Year	Pld	W	D	L	Win %	FR	BR	WR	BC	BF
Total	18	10	3	5	55.56	7	3	14	▲5	▼4
2025	6	3	1	2	50.00					
2024	12	7	2	3	58.33					

== Head-to-head record ==
As of 2 June 2025, after the match against Brazil.

Head-to-head record
AFC (Asia)
Team (nation)	Pld	W	D	L
South Korea	34	19	11	4
North Korea	30	10	8	12
China	44	17	10	17
Chinese Taipei	25	18	1	6
Thailand	14	13	0	0
Vietnam	14	14	0	0
Philippines	4	4	0	0
Australia	28	12	8	8
Hong Kong	8	8	0	0
Indonesia	2	2	0	0
India	5	4	0	1
Malaysia	2	2	0	0
Nepal	2	2	0	0
Singapore	2	2	0	0
Uzbekistan	3	3	0	0
Guam	3	3	0	0
Myanmar	3	3	0	0
Jordan	4	4	0	0
Total	223	138	37	48
CAF (Africa)
Team (nation)	Pld	W	D	L
Nigeria	6	5	0	1
South Africa	2	1	1	0
Ghana	2	2	0	0
Cameroon	1	1	0	0
Zambia	1	1	0	0
Total	12	10	1	1
CONCACAF (North and Central America)
Team (nation)	Pld	W	D	L
United States	41	2	8	31
Canada	16	8	4	4
Mexico	8	6	1	1
Costa Rica	2	2	0	0
Panama	2	2	0	0
Total	67	19	13	35

Head-to-head record
CONMEBOL (South America)
Team (nation)	Pld	W	D	L
Brazil	18	7	3	8
Argentina	6	5	1	0
Colombia	3	2	1	0
Chile	2	1	1	0
Ecuador	1	1	0	0
Paraguay	1	1	0	0
	31	17	6	8
OFC (Oceania)
Team (nation)	Pld	W	D	L
New Zealand	13	11	2	0
Total	13	11	2	0
UEFA (Europe)
Team (nation)	Pld	W	D	L
Italy	8	1	0	7
Germany	14	1	2	11
France	8	3	0	5
Sweden	15	5	3	7
Russia	6	4	0	2
England	10	1	2	7
Norway	10	7	0	3
Czech Republic	1	0	0	1
Slovakia	1	1	0	0
Finland	3	2	0	1
Great Britain	1	0	0	1
Hungary	1	1	0	0
Austria	1	1	0	0
Denmark	9	5	1	3
Netherlands	9	4	1	4
Scotland	3	3	0	0
Portugal	2	2	0	0
Iceland	4	3	0	1
Switzerland	2	2	0	0
Spain	6	1	1	4
Belgium	1	0	1	0
Serbia	1	1	0	0
Total	116	48	11	57
	462	243	70	149

== Staff ==
=== Coaching staff ===
As of 18 May 2026

Role	Name	Start date	Ref.
Manager	(Japan) Michihisa Kano	14 May 2026	
Assistant coach	(Japan) Masatada Ishii	18 September 2026	
Assistant coach	(Japan) Yukari Kinga	18 May 2026	
Assistant coach	(Japan) Atsuto Uchida	18 May 2026	
Goalkeeper coach	(Japan) Tomoyuki Sano	18 May 2026	

- Players & Staffs (2026), JFA.jp

=== Head coach history ===
Name	Years	Matches	Won	Drawn	Lost	Win %
(Japan) Seiki Ichihara (市原 聖曠)	1981	0	0	0	0	0%
(Japan) Takao Orii (折井 孝男)	1984	0	0	0	0	0%
(Japan) Ryohei Suzuki (鈴木 良平)	1986–1989	0	0	0	0	0%
(Japan) Satoshi Miyauchi (宮内 聡)	1997–1999	0	0	0	0	0%
(Japan) Shinobu Ikeda (池田 司信)	2000–2001	0	0	0	0	0%
(Japan) Eiji Ueda (上田 栄治)	2002–2004	0	0	0	0	0%
(Japan) Hiroshi Ohashi (大橋 浩司)	2004–2008	0	0	0	0	0%
(Japan) Norio Sasaki (佐々木 則夫)	2008–2016	0	0	0	0	0%
(Japan) Asako Takakura (高倉 麻子)	2016–2021	0	0	0	0	0%
(Japan) Futoshi Ikeda (池田 太)	2021–2024	33	21	4	8	55.56%
(Japan) Norio Sasaki (佐々木 則夫)	2024 (interim)	1	1	0	0	100%
(Denmark) Nils Nielsen (ニルス・ニールセン)	2024–2026	6	3	1	2	50%
(Japan) Michihisa Kano (狩野倫久)	2026–present					

As of 2 June 2025, after the match against Brazil.

== Players ==
=== Current squad ===
The following players were called up for the MIZUHO BLUE CHALLENGE NADESHIKO 2026 matches against Brazil on 29 November and 5 December 2026, respectively.

Caps and goals correct as of 14 October 2026, after the match against Germany.

No.	Pos.	Player	Date of birth (age)	Caps	Goals	Club
1	GK	Ayaka Yamashita	29 September 1995 (age 31)	91	0	(The Football Association) Manchester City
12	GK	Shū Ohba	11 July 2002 (age 24)	5	0	(Scottish Football Association) Rangers
23	GK	Akane Ōkuma	15 September 2004 (age 22)	5	0	(The Football Association) Aston Villa
2	DF	Risa Shimizu	15 June 1996 (age 30)	91	4	(The Football Association) Manchester City
3	DF	Rion Ishikawa	4 July 2003 (age 23)	16	0	(The Football Association) Everton
4	DF	Miyabi Moriya	22 August 1996 (age 30)	30	2	(United States Soccer Federation) Utah Royals
5	DF	Hana Takahashi	19 February 2000 (age 26)	50	5	(Japan Football Association) Urawa Reds
6	DF	Tōko Koga	6 January 2006 (age 20)	33	4	(The Football Association) Tottenham Hotspur
13	DF	Hikaru Kitagawa	10 May 1997 (age 29)	34	2	(The Football Association) Everton
20	DF	Yu Endō	29 October 1997 (age 29)	3	0	(The Football Association) West Ham United
21	DF	Uno Shiragaki	11 October 2005 (age 21)	3	0	(United States Soccer Federation) North Carolina Courage
7	MF	Hinata Miyazawa	28 November 1999 (age 26)	66	12	(The Football Association) Manchester United
8	MF	Kiko Seike	8 August 1996 (age 30)	41	16	(The Football Association) Brighton & Hove Albion
10	MF	Fūka Nagano	9 March 1999 (age 27)	63	1	(The Football Association) Liverpool
14	MF	Yui Hasegawa	29 January 1997 (age 29)	109	23	(The Football Association) Manchester City
15	MF	Aoba Fujino	27 January 2004 (age 22)	48	12	(The Football Association) Manchester City
16	MF	Yuzuki Yamamoto	1 September 2002 (age 24)	12	1	(United States Soccer Federation) Denver Summit
17	MF	Maika Hamano	9 May 2004 (age 22)	36	11	(The Football Association) Chelsea
18	MF	Narumi Miura	3 July 1997 (age 29)	37	1	(United States Soccer Federation) Utah Royals
19	MF	Momoko Tanikawa	7 May 2005 (age 21)	25	8	(German Football Association) Bayern Munich
22	MF	Remina Chiba	30 April 1999 (age 27)	32	7	(Italian Football Federation) Juventus
9	FW	Riko Ueki	30 July 1999 (age 27)	54	19	(The Football Association) West Ham United
11	FW	Manaka Matsukubo	28 July 2004 (age 22)	18	1	(The Football Association) Chelsea

=== Recent call-ups ===
The following players have also been called up to the squad within the past 12 months.

Pos.	Player	Date of birth (age)	Caps	Goals	Club	Latest call-up
GK	Mamiko Matsumoto ^{INJ}	9 October 1997 (age 29)	0	0	(Germany) Mainz 05	v. Haiti, 9 October 2026
GK	Natsumi Asano	14 April 1997 (age 29)	2	0	(Japan) Chifure AS Elfen Saitama	2026 Asian Games
GK	Shiori Fukuda	13 June 2002 (age 24)	1	0	(Japan) Urawa Reds	2026 Asian Games
GK	Chika Hirao	31 December 1996 (age 29)	17	0	(Japan) Albirex Niigata	v. South Africa, 9 June 2026
DF	Sumire Suzuki	24 January 2004 (age 22)	2	0	(Japan) JEF United Chiba	2026 Asian Games
DF	Sakurako Ōhashi	8 April 2004 (age 22)	5	0	(Japan) Toyo University	2026 Asian Games
DF	Gotō Wakaba	4 June 2001 (age 25)	5	0	(Japan) Urawa Reds	2026 Asian Games
DF	Yūki Seno	30 December 1996 (age 29)	5	0	(Japan) Chifure AS Elfen Saitama	2026 Asian Games
DF	Ai Kuwahara	18 August 2004 (age 22)	5	0	(Japan) INAC Kobe Leonessa	2026 Asian Games
DF	Fukina Mizuno	31 January 2001 (age 25)	5	0	(Japan) INAC Kobe Leonessa	2026 Asian Games
DF	Chisato Ichinose ^{INJ}	7 June 1999 (age 27)	1	0	(Japan) Sanfrecce Hiroshima Regina	2026 Asian Games
DF	Moeka Minami	7 December 1998 (age 27)	74	5	(England) Brighton & Hove Albion	v. South Africa, 9 June 2026
DF	Saki Kumagai	17 October 1990 (age 36)	173	4	(England) West Ham United	v. South Africa, 9 June 2026
DF	Akari Takeshige	15 January 2003 (age 23)	2	0	(Netherlands) Feyenoord	v. South Africa, 9 June 2026
MF	Honoka Hayashi	19 May 1998 (age 28)	47	2	(England) Everton	v. Germany, 14 October 2026
MF	Yui Narumiya	22 February 1995 (age 31)	20	6	(Japan) INAC Kobe Leonessa	v. Germany, 14 October 2026
MF	Fūka Tsunoda	24 October 2004 (age 22)	0	0	(England) Crystal Palace	v. Germany, 14 October 2026
MF	Fūna Yanase	6 June 2002 (age 24)	4	0	(Japan) Sanfrecce Hiroshima Regina	2026 Asian Games
MF	Kotono Sakakibara	11 October 2004 (age 22)	2	1	(Japan) Urawa Reds	2026 Asian Games
MF	Yuzuho Shiokoshi	1 November 1997 (age 29)	14	3	(Japan) Tokyo Verdy Beleza	2026 Asian Games
MF	Juri Ito	2 October 2002 (age 24)	8	0	(Japan) Nojima Stella Kanagawa Sagamihara	2026 Asian Games
MF	Saori Takarada	27 December 1999 (age 26)	30	7	(Japan) Cerezo Osaka	2026 Asian Games
MF	Hikaru Yūmura	18 October 1997 (age 29)	3	1	(Japan) Nojima Stella Kanagawa Sagamihara	2026 Asian Games
MF	Yoshino Nakashima	27 July 1999 (age 27)	15	5	(Japan) Sanfrecce Hiroshima Regina	2026 Asian Games
MF	Yūka Momiki	9 April 1996 (age 30)	50	15	(England) Everton	v. South Africa, 9 June 2026
FW	Maya Hijikata	13 April 2004 (age 22)	7	2	(England) Aston Villa	v. Germany, 14 October 2026
FW	Mei Shimada	8 May 2002 (age 24)	1	0	(Germany) Werder Bremen	v. Germany, 14 October 2026
FW	Mina Tanaka ^{INJ}	28 April 1994 (age 32)	105	47	(United States) Utah Royals	v. Haiti, 9 October 2026
FW	Megu Hamada	27 December 2000 (age 25)	7	1	(Japan) RB Omiya Ardija	2026 Asian Games
FW	Mami Ueno	27 September 1996 (age 30)	21	4	(Japan) Sanfrecce Hiroshima Regina	2026 Asian Games
FW	Chiina Kamiya	29 March 2001 (age 25)	6	7	(Japan) Sanfrecce Hiroshima Regina	2026 Asian Games
FW	Nanasa Ikuta	14 September 2003 (age 23)	4	1	(Japan) Chifure AS Elfen Saitama	2026 Asian Games
FW	Ai Tsujisawa	17 December 2005 (age 20)	2	0	(Japan) INAC Kobe Leonessa	2026 Asian Games
FW	Hanon Nishio	27 April 2003 (age 23)	4	2	(Japan) RB Omiya Ardija	2026 Asian Games
FW	Riko Yoshida ^{INJ}	18 June 2002 (age 24)	4	0	(Japan) INAC Kobe Leonessa	2026 Asian Games
Notes: ^{INJ} = Withdrew due to injury; ^{PRE} = Preliminary squad / standby; ^{RET} = Retired from the national team

=== Previous squads ===
Bold indicates winning squads

FIFA Women's World Cup

- 1991 FIFA Women's World Cup
- 1995 FIFA Women's World Cup
- 1999 FIFA Women's World Cup
- 2003 FIFA Women's World Cup
- 2007 FIFA Women's World Cup
- **2011 FIFA Women's World Cup**
- 2015 FIFA Women's World Cup
- 2019 FIFA Women's World Cup
- 2023 FIFA Women's World Cup

Olympic Games

- 1996 Summer Olympics
- 2004 Summer Olympics
- 2008 Summer Olympics
- 2012 Summer Olympics
- 2020 Summer Olympics
- 2024 Summer Olympics

AFC Women's Asian Cup

- 2010 Women's AFC Asian Cup
- **2014 Women's AFC Asian Cup**
- **2018 Women's AFC Asian Cup**
- 2022 Women's AFC Asian Cup
- **2026 Women's AFC Asian Cup**

Asian Games

- 1990 Asian Games
- 1994 Asian Games
- 1998 Asian Games
- 2002 Asian Games
- 2006 Asian Games
- **2010 Asian Games**
- 2014 Asian Games
- **2018 Asian Games**
- **2022 Asian Games**
- **2026 Asian Games**

EAFF E-1 Football Championship

- 2015 EAFF Women's East Asian Cup
- 2017 EAFF E-1 Football Championship
- **2019 EAFF E-1 Football Championship**

=== Captains ===
Bold indicates current captain

- Yumi Obe (?–2004)
- Hiromi Ikeda (2004–2008)
- Homare Sawa (2008–2012)
- Aya Miyama (2012–2016)
- Saki Kumagai (2016–2025)
- **Yui Hasegawa** (2025–present)

== Records ==
As of 9 June 2026

Players in bold are still active with the national team.

=== Most appearances ===
Rank	Player	Career	Caps	Goals
1	Homare Sawa	1993–2015	205	83
2	**Saki Kumagai**	2008–present	173	4
3	Aya Miyama	2003–2016	162	38
4	Shinobu Ohno	2003–2016	139	40
5	Yuki Nagasato	2004–2016	132	58
6	Kozue Ando	1999–2015	126	19
7	Mizuho Sakaguchi	2006–2019	124	29
8	Azusa Iwashimizu	2006–2016	122	11
9	Hiromi Ikeda	1997–2008	119	4
10	Tomoe Kato	1997–2008	114	8
10	Aya Sameshima	2008–2021	114	5

=== Top goalscorers ===
Rank	Player	Career	Goals	Caps	Avg.
1	Homare Sawa	1993–2015	83	205	0.40
2	Yuki Nagasato	2004–2016	58	132	0.44
3	Kaori Nagamine	1984–1996	48	64	0.75
4	**Mina Tanaka**	2013–present	47	105	0.45
5	Shinobu Ohno	2003–2016	40	139	0.29
6	Aya Miyama	2003–2016	38	162	0.23
7	Mana Iwabuchi	2010–2023	36	89	0.40
8	Mio Otani	2000–2007	31	73	0.42
9	Futaba Kioka	1981–1996	30	75	0.40
10	Asako Takakura	1984–1999	29	79	0.37
10	Mizuho Sakaguchi	2006–2019	29	124	0.23

== Honours ==
=== Intercontinental ===
- FIFA Women's World Cup

(gold) Champions: 2011
(silver) Runners-up: 2015

- Olympic Games

(silver) Runners-up: 2012

=== Continental ===
- AFC Women's Asian Cup

(gold) Champions: 2014, 2018, 2026
(silver) Runners-up: 1986, 1991, 1995, 2001

- Asian Games

(gold) Champions: 2010, 2018, 2022, 2026
(silver) Runners-up: 1990, 1994, 2006, 2014

=== Regional ===
- EAFF E-1 Football Championship

Champions: 2008, 2010, 2019, 2022
Runners-up: 2013, 2017

=== Other tournaments ===
- Algarve Cup

Runners-up: 2012, 2014

- SheBelieves Cup

Champions: 2025
Runners-up: 2023

== Competitive record ==
Champions Runners-up Third place Fourth place

=== FIFA Women's World Cup ===
FIFA Women's World Cup record
Year	Result	Pld	W	D*	L	GF	GA	GD	Squad	Coach
(China) 1991	Group stage	3	0	0	3	0	12	−12	Squad	Tamotsu Suzuki
(Sweden) 1995	Quarter-finals	4	1	0	3	2	8	−6	Squad	Tamotsu Suzuki
(United States) 1999	Group stage	3	0	1	2	1	10	−9	Squad	Satoshi Miyauchi
(United States) 2003	Group stage	3	1	0	2	7	6	+1	Squad	Eiji Ueda
(China) 2007	Group stage	3	1	1	1	3	4	−1	Squad	Hiroshi Ohashi
(Germany) 2011	Champions	6	4	1	1	12	6	+6	Squad	Norio Sasaki
(Canada) 2015	Runners-up	7	6	0	1	11	8	+3	Squad	Norio Sasaki
(France) 2019	Round of 16	4	1	1	2	3	5	−2	Squad	Asako Takakura
(Australia) (New Zealand) 2023	Quarter-finals	5	4	0	1	15	3	+12	Squad	Futoshi Ikeda
(Brazil) 2027	Qualified									
(Costa Rica) (Jamaica) (Mexico) (United States) 2031	To be determined									
(United Kingdom) 2035	To be determined									
Total:10/10	1 Title	38	18	4	16	54	62	−8		

*Draws include knockout matches decided on penalty kicks.

FIFA Women's World Cup history
Year	Round	Date	Opponent	Result	Stadium
(China) 1991	Group stage	17 November	Brazil	L 0–1	New Plaza Stadium, Foshan
(China) 1991	Group stage	19 November	Sweden	L 0–8	New Plaza Stadium, Foshan
(China) 1991	Group stage	21 November	United States	L 0–3	New Plaza Stadium, Foshan
(Sweden) 1995	Group stage	5 June	Germany	L 0–1	Tingvallen, Karlstad
(Sweden) 1995	Group stage	7 June	Brazil	W 2–1	Tingvallen, Karlstad
(Sweden) 1995	Group stage	9 June	Sweden	L 0–2	Arosvallen, Västerås
(Sweden) 1995	Quarter-finals	13 June	United States	L 0–4	Strömvallen, Gävle
(United States) 1999	Group stage	19 June	Canada	D 1–1	Spartan Stadium, San Jose
(United States) 1999	Group stage	23 June	Russia	L 0–5	Civic Stadium, Portland
(United States) 1999	Group stage	26 June	Norway	L 0–4	Soldier Field, Chicago
(United States) 2003	Group stage	20 September	Argentina	W 6–0	Columbus Crew Stadium, Columbus
(United States) 2003	Group stage	24 September	Germany	L 0–3	Columbus Crew Stadium, Columbus
(United States) 2003	Group stage	27 September	Canada	L 1–3	Gillette Stadium, Foxborough
(China) 2007	Group stage	11 September	England	D 2–2	Hongkou Stadium, Shanghai
(China) 2007	Group stage	14 September	Argentina	W 1–0	Hongkou Stadium, Shanghai
(China) 2007	Group stage	17 September	Germany	L 0–2	Yellow Dragon Sports Center, Hangzhou
(Germany) 2011	Group stage	27 June	New Zealand	W 2–1	Ruhrstadion, Bochum
(Germany) 2011	Group stage	1 July	Mexico	W 4–0	BayArena, Leverkusen
(Germany) 2011	Group stage	5 July	England	L 0–2	Impuls Arena, Augsburg
(Germany) 2011	Quarter-finals	9 July	Germany	W 1–0	Volkswagen-Arena, Wolfsburg
(Germany) 2011	Semi-finals	13 July	Sweden	W 3–1	Commerzbank-Arena, Frankfurt
(Germany) 2011	Final	17 July	United States	D 2–2 (3–1 p)	Commerzbank-Arena, Frankfurt
(Canada) 2015	Group stage	8 June	Switzerland	W 1–0	BC Place, Vancouver
(Canada) 2015	Group stage	12 June	Cameroon	W 2–1	BC Place, Vancouver
(Canada) 2015	Group stage	16 June	Ecuador	W 1–0	Winnipeg Stadium, Winnipeg
(Canada) 2015	Round of 16	23 June	Netherlands	W 2–1	BC Place, Vancouver
(Canada) 2015	Quarter-finals	27 June	Australia	W 1–0	Commonwealth Stadium, Edmonton
(Canada) 2015	Semi-finals	1 July	England	W 2–1	Commonwealth Stadium, Edmonton
(Canada) 2015	Final	5 July	United States	L 2–5	BC Place, Vancouver
(France) 2019	Group stage	10 June	Argentina	D 0–0	Parc des Princes, Paris
(France) 2019	Group stage	14 June	Scotland	W 2–1	Roazhon Park, Rennes
(France) 2019	Group stage	19 June	England	L 0–2	Allianz Riviera, Nice
(France) 2019	Round of 16	25 June	Netherlands	L 1–2	Roazhon Park, Rennes
(Australia) (New Zealand) 2023	Group stage	22 July	Zambia	W 5–0	Waikato Stadium, Hamilton
(Australia) (New Zealand) 2023	Group stage	26 July	Costa Rica	W 2–0	Forsyth Barr Stadium, Dunedin
(Australia) (New Zealand) 2023	Group stage	31 July	Spain	W 4–0	Wellington Regional Stadium, Wellington
(Australia) (New Zealand) 2023	Round of 16	5 August	Norway	W 3–1	Wellington Regional Stadium, Wellington
(Australia) (New Zealand) 2023	Quarter-finals	11 August	Sweden	L 1–2	Eden Park, Auckland

=== Olympic Games ===
(International Olympic Committee) Summer Olympics record
Year	Result	Pld	W	D*	L	GF	GA	GD	Squad	Coach
(United States) 1996	Round 1	3	0	0	3	2	9	−7	Squad	Tamotsu Suzuki
(Australia) 2000	Did not qualify									
(Greece) 2004	Quarter-finals	3	1	0	2	2	3	−1	Squad	Eiji Ueda
(China) 2008	Fourth place	6	2	1	3	11	10	+1	Squad	Norio Sasaki
(United Kingdom) 2012	Runners-up	6	3	2	1	7	4	+3	Squad	Norio Sasaki
(Brazil) 2016	Did not qualify									
(Japan) 2020	Quarter-finals	4	1	1	2	3	5	−2	Squad	Asako Takakura
(France) 2024	Quarter-finals	4	2	0	2	6	5	+1	Squad	Futoshi Ikeda
Total:6/8	Runners-up	26	9	4	13	31	36	−5	—	—

*Draws include knockout matches decided via penalty shoot-out.

Summer Olympics history
Year	Round	Date	Opponent	Result	Stadium
(United States) 1996	Group stage	21 July	Germany	L 2–3	Legion Field, Birmingham
(United States) 1996	Group stage	23 July	Brazil	L 0–2	Legion Field, Birmingham
(United States) 1996	Group stage	25 July	Norway	L 0–4	RFK Stadium, Washington, D.C.
(Greece) 2004	Group stage	11 August	Sweden	W 1–0	Panthessaliko Stadium, Volos
(Greece) 2004	Group stage	14 August	Nigeria	L 0–1	Karaiskaki Stadium, Athens
(Greece) 2004	Quarter-finals	20 August	United States	L 1–2	Kaftanzoglio Stadium, Thessaloniki
(China) 2008	Group stage	6 August	New Zealand	D 2–2	Qinhuangdao Olympic Sports Center Stadium, Qinhuangdao
(China) 2008	Group stage	9 August	United States	L 0–1	Qinhuangdao Olympic Sports Center Stadium, Qinhuangdao
(China) 2008	Group stage	12 August	Norway	W 5–1	Shanghai Stadium, Shanghai
(China) 2008	Quarter-finals	15 August	China	W 2–0	Qinhuangdao Olympic Sports Center Stadium, Qinhuangdao
(China) 2008	Semi-finals	18 August	United States	L 2–4	Workers Stadium, Beijing
(China) 2008	Bronze medal	21 August	Germany	L 0–2	Workers Stadium, Beijing
(United Kingdom) 2012	Group stage	25 July	Canada	W 2–1	City of Coventry Stadium, Coventry
(United Kingdom) 2012	Group stage	28 July	Sweden	D 0–0	City of Coventry Stadium, Coventry
(United Kingdom) 2012	Group stage	31 July	South Africa	D 0–0	Millennium Stadium, Cardiff
(United Kingdom) 2012	Quarter-finals	3 August	Brazil	W 2–0	Millennium Stadium, Cardiff
(United Kingdom) 2012	Semi-finals	6 August	France	W 2–1	Wembley Stadium, London
(United Kingdom) 2012	Gold medal	9 August	United States	L 1–2	Wembley Stadium, London
(Japan) 2020	Group stage	21 July	Canada	D 1–1	Sapporo Dome, Sapporo
(Japan) 2020	Group stage	24 July	Great Britain	L 0–1	Sapporo Dome, Sapporo
(Japan) 2020	Group stage	27 July	Chile	W 1–0	Miyagi Stadium, Rifu
(Japan) 2020	Quarter-finals	30 July	Sweden	L 1–3	Saitama Stadium 2002, Saitama
(France) 2024	Group stage	25 July	Spain	L 1–2	Stade de la Beaujoire, Nantes
(France) 2024	Group stage	28 July	Brazil	W 2–1	Parc des Princes, Paris
(France) 2024	Group stage	31 July	Nigeria	W 3–1	Stade de la Beaujoire, Nantes
(France) 2024	Quarter-finals	3 August	United States	L 0–1 (a.e.t.)	Parc des Princes, Paris

=== AFC Women's Asian Cup ===
AFC Women's Asian Cup											Qualification						
Hosts / Year	Result	M	W	D	L	GF	GA	GD	Squad	Coach	M	W	D	L	GF	GA	GD
(Hong Kong) 1975	Did not enter										No Qualification						
(Taiwan) 1977	Group Stage	2	0	0	2	0	8	−8	Squad		No Qualification						
(India) 1980	Did not enter										No Qualification						
(Hong Kong) 1981	Group stage	3	1	0	2	1	3	−2	Squad		No Qualification						
1983	Did not enter										No Qualification						
(Hong Kong) 1986	Runners-up	4	2	0	2	14	4	+10	Squad		No Qualification						
(Hong Kong) 1989	Third place	5	4	0	1	37	1	+36	Squad		No Qualification						
(Japan) 1991	Runners-up	6	4	1	1	27	6	+21	Squad		No Qualification						
(Malaysia) 1993	Third place	5	4	0	1	29	4	+25	Squad		No Qualification						
(Malaysia) 1995	Runners-up	5	4	0	1	27	3	+24	Squad		No Qualification						
(China) 1997	Third place	5	4	0	1	33	1	+32	Squad		No Qualification						
(Philippines) 1999	Fourth place	6	4	0	2	36	6	+30	Squad		No Qualification						
(Taiwan) 2001	Runners-up	6	4	0	2	30	5	+25	Squad		No Qualification						
2003	Fourth place	6	4	0	2	34	4	+30	Squad		No Qualification						
(Australia) 2006	Fourth place	5	3	0	2	19	6	+13	Squad		Directly Qualified						
(Vietnam) 2008	Third place	5	3	0	2	19	7	+12	Squad		Directly Qualified						
(China) 2010	Third place	5	4	0	1	16	2	+14	Squad	Norio Sasaki	Directly Qualified						
(Vietnam) 2014	Champions	5	4	1	0	16	3	+13	Squad	Norio Sasaki	Directly Qualified						
(Jordan) 2018	Champions	5	3	2	0	9	2	+7	Squad	Asako Takakura	Directly Qualified						
(India) 2022	Semi-finals	5	3	2	0	18	3	+15	Squad	Futoshi Ikeda	Directly Qualified						
(Australia) 2026	Champions	6	6	0	0	29	1	+28	Squad	Nils Nielsen	Directly Qualified						
Total:18/21	3 Titles	89	61	6	22	394	69	+325	—	—	0	0	0	0	0	0	0

- Draws include knockout matches decided on penalty kicks.
- A Japanese representative side FC Jinnan representing Japan participated in the 1977 AFC Women's Championship.

=== Asian Games ===
Asian Games record
Host	Result	M	W	D	L	GF	GA	GD	Squad	Coach
(China) 1990	Runners-up	5	3	1	1	17	8	+9	Squad	Tamotsu Suzuki
(Japan) 1994	Runners-up	4	2	1	1	9	3	+6	Squad	Tamotsu Suzuki
1998	Third place	5	3	0	2	18	7	+11	Squad	Satoshi Miyauchi
(South Korea) 2002	Third place	5	3	1	1	8	3	+5	Squad	Eiji Ueda
(Qatar) 2006	Runners-up	5	4	1	0	21	1	+20	Squad	Hiroshi Ohashi
(China) 2010	Champions	4	3	1	0	6	0	+6	Squad	Norio Sasaki
(South Korea) 2014	Runners-up	6	4	1	1	28	3	+25	Squad	Norio Sasaki
(Indonesia) 2018	Champions	5	5	0	0	14	2	+12	Squad	Asako Takakura
(China) 2022	Champions	6	6	0	0	39	5	+34	Squad	Michihisa Kano
(Japan) 2026	Champions	6	5	1	0	28	2	+26	Squad	Michihisa Kano
(Qatar) 2030
Total	10/10	51	38	7	6	188	34	+154	—	—

*Draws include knockout matches decided on penalty kicks.

- The 2022 edition was rescheduled to September–October 2023; as a result, Japan sent a B team with a separate coaching staff while the senior team competed in its regularly scheduled matches in the September 2023 FIFA international window.

=== EAFF E-1 Football Championship ===
EAFF E-1 Football Championship record
Host	Result	M	W	D	L	GF	GA	GD	Squad	Coach
(South Korea) 2005	Third place	3	0	2	1	0	1	−1	Squad	
(China) 2008	Champions	3	3	0	0	8	2	+6	Squad	
(Japan) 2010	Champions	3	3	0	0	7	1	+6	Squad	
(South Korea) 2013	Runners-up	3	1	1	1	3	2	+1	Squad	
(China) 2015	Third place	3	1	0	2	5	6	−1	Squad	Norio Sasaki
(Japan) 2017	Runners-up	3	2	0	1	4	4	0	Squad	Asako Takakura
(South Korea) 2019	Champions	3	3	0	0	13	0	+13	Squad	Asako Takakura
(Japan) 2022	Champions	3	2	1	0	6	2	+4	Squad	Futoshi Ikeda
(South Korea) 2025	Third place	3	1	2	0	5	1	+4	Squad	Nils Nilsen
Total	9/9	27	16	6	5	51	19	+32	—	—

*Draws include knockout matches decided on penalty kicks.

EAFF E-1 Football Championship history
Year	Round	Opponent	Score	Result
2005	First match	North Korea	0–1	Loss
2005	Second match	China	0–0	Draw
2005	Third match	South Korea	0–0	Draw
2008	First match	North Korea	3–2	Win
2008	Second match	South Korea	2–0	Win
2008	Third match	South Korea	3–0	Win
2010	First match	China	2–0	Win
2010	Second match	Chinese Taipei	3–0	Win
2010	Third match	South Korea	2–1	Win
2013	First match	China	2–0	Win
2013	Second match	North Korea	0–0	Draw
2013	Third match	South Korea	1–2	Loss
2015	First match	North Korea	2–4	Loss
2015	Second match	South Korea	1–2	Loss
2015	Third match	China	2–0	Win
2017	First match	South Korea	3–2	Win
2017	Second match	China	1–0	Win
2017	Third match	North Korea	0–2	Loss
2019	First match	Chinese Taipei	7–0	Win
2019	Second match	China	3–0	Win
2019	Third match	South Korea	1–0	Win
2022	First match	South Korea	2–1	Win
2022	Second match	Chinese Taipei	4–1	Win
2022	Third match	China	0–0	Draw
2025	First match	Chinese Taipei	4–0	Win
2025	Second match	South Korea	1–1	Draw
2025	Third match	China	0–0	Draw

=== Algarve Cup ===
The Algarve Cup was an invitational international tournament, hosted by the Portuguese Football Federation (FPF). Held annually in the Algarve region of Portugal from 1994 to 2022, it was one of the most prestigious and longest-running women's international football events and has been nicknamed the "Mini FIFA Women's World Cup."

(Portugal) Algarve Cup record
Year	Result	Matches	Wins	Draws	Losses	GF	GA	GD	Squad	Coach
1994–2010	Did not enter									
2011	3rd place	4	3	0	1	9	3	+6	Squad	
2012	2nd place	4	3	0	1	8	5	+3	Squad	Norio Sasaki
2013	5th place	4	2	0	2	4	4	0	Squad	Norio Sasaki
2014	2nd place	4	2	1	1	4	5	−1	Squad	Norio Sasaki
2015	9th place	4	2	0	2	7	5	+2	Squad	Norio Sasaki
2016	Did not enter									
2017	6th place	4	2	0	2	7	5	+2	Squad	Asako Takakura
2018	6th place	4	2	0	2	6	9	−3	Squad	Asako Takakura
2019–2023	Did not enter									
Total	7/27	28	16	1	11	45	36	+9	—	—

=== Cyprus Women's Cup ===
Cyprus Women's Cup record
Year	Result	GP	W	D	L	GF	GA	GD
2008	Third place	3	1	1	1	5	5	0
2009—2023	Did not enter							
Total	1/13	3	1	1	1	5	5	0

=== SheBelieves Cup ===
The SheBelieves Cup is a global invitational tournament hosted in the United States.

(United States) SheBelieves Cup record
Year	Result	Matches	Wins	Draws	Losses	GF	GA	Squad	Coach
2016–2018	Did not enter								
2019	Third place	3	1	1	1	5	6	Squad	Asako Takakura
2020	Fourth place	3	0	0	3	2	7	Squad	Asako Takakura
2021	Withdrew due to the COVID-19 pandemic								
2022	Did not enter								
2023	Runners-up	3	1	0	2	3	2	Squad	Futoshi Ikeda
2024	Fourth place	2	0	1	1	2	3	Squad	Futoshi Ikeda
2025	Champions	3	3	0	0	10	2	Squad	Nils Nielsen
2026	Did not enter								
Total	5/11	14	5	2	7	22	20		

SheBelieves Cup history
Year	Round	Opponent	Score	Result
2019	First match	United States	2–2	Draw
2019	Second match	Brazil	3–1	Win
2019	Third match	England	0–3	Loss
2020	First match	Spain	1–3	Loss
2020	Second match	England	0–1	Loss
2020	Third match	United States	1–3	Loss
2023	First match	Brazil	0–1	Loss
2023	Second match	United States	0–1	Loss
2023	Third match	Canada	3–0	Win
2024	First match	United States	1–2	Loss
2024	Second match	Brazil	2–2 (0–3 (p))	Draw
2025	First match	Australia	4–0	Win
2025	Second match	Colombia	4–1	Win
2025	Third match	United States	2–1	Win

=== Tournament of Nations ===
The Tournament of Nations was a global invitational tournament for national teams in non-World Cup and non-Olympic years hosted by the United States Soccer Federation (USSF) in several American cities. The inaugural tournament was held in 2017.

The 2021 edition would have been a pre-Olympics tournament due to the rescheduling of the Tokyo Olympics. On May 6, 2021, however, the USSF announced that it would no longer hold Tournament of Nations because recent changes in international windows by FIFA made a round-robin tournament unfeasible.

(United States) Tournament of Nations record
Year	Result	Matches	Wins	Draws	Losses	GF	GA	Squad	Coach
2017	Third place	3	0	1	2	3	8	Squad	Asako Takakura
2018	Fourth place	3	0	0	3	3	8	Squad	Asako Takakura
Total	2/2	6	0	1	5	6	16	—	—

Tournament of Nations history
Year	Round	Opponent	Score	Result
2017	First match	Brazil	1–1	Draw
2017	Second match	Australia	2–4	Loss
2017	Third match	United States	0–3	Loss
2018	First match	United States	2–4	Loss
2018	Second match	Brazil	1–2	Loss
2018	Third match	Australia	0–2	Loss

== See also ==
Men's national teams

- Japan national football team
- Japan national under-23 football team
- Japan national under-20 football team
- Japan national under-17 football team
- Japan national futsal team
- Japan national under-20 futsal team
- Japan national beach soccer team

Women's national teams

- Japan women's national under-20 football team
- Japan women's national under-17 football team
- Japan women's national futsal team

Sporting positions
Preceded by 2007 Germany	World Champions; 2011	Succeeded by 2015 United States
Preceded by 2010 Australia	Asian Champions; 2014 (first title); 2018 (second title)	Succeeded by 2022 China
Preceded by 2022 China	Asian Champions; 2026 (third title) (Defending champions)	Succeeded by TBD
