= 2018 Tournament of Nations squads =

List of players competing at the 2nd edition of the Tournament of Nations

This article lists the squads for the 2018 Tournament of Nations, the 2nd edition of the Tournament of Nations. The cup consisted of a series of friendly games, and was held in the United States from 26 July to 2 August 2018. The four national teams involved in the tournament registered a squad of 23 players.

The age listed for each player is on 26 July 2018, the first day of the tournament. The club listed is the club for which the player last played a competitive match prior to the tournament. The nationality for each club reflects the national association (not the league) to which the club is affiliated. A flag is included for coaches that are of a different nationality than their own national team.

== Squads ==
=== Australia ===
Coach: Alen Stajcic

The final squad was announced on 17 July 2018. A day later, teenage bolter Mary Fowler was added to the squad. On 24 July 2018, Steph Catley withdrew from the squad due to family reasons and was replaced by Laura Alleway.

No.	Pos.	Player	Date of birth (age)	Caps	Goals	Club
1	GK	Lydia Williams	13 May 1988 (aged 30)	69	0	(United States Soccer Federation) Seattle Reign
2	MF	Amy Sayer	30 November 2001 (aged 16)	0	0	(Football Australia) North Shore Mariners
4	DF	Clare Polkinghorne	1 February 1989 (aged 29)	105	8	(United States Soccer Federation) Houston Dash
5	FW	Mary Fowler	14 February 2003 (aged 15)	0	0	(Football Australia) Bankstown City
6	MF	Chloe Logarzo	22 December 1994 (aged 23)	30	4	(Football Australia) Blacktown Spartans
7	DF	Laura Alleway	28 November 1989 (aged 28)	55	2	(Football Australia) Melbourne Victory
8	MF	Elise Kellond-Knight	10 August 1990 (aged 27)	95	1	(Swedish Football Association) Hammarby
9	FW	Caitlin Foord	11 November 1994 (aged 23)	60	11	(United States Soccer Federation) Portland Thorns
10	MF	Emily van Egmond	12 July 1993 (aged 25)	75	15	(United States Soccer Federation) Orlando Pride
11	FW	Lisa De Vanna	14 November 1984 (aged 33)	137	45	(Football Australia) Sydney FC
13	MF	Tameka Butt	16 June 1991 (aged 27)	68	9	(Norwegian Football Federation) Klepp
14	DF	Alanna Kennedy	21 January 1995 (aged 23)	69	5	(United States Soccer Federation) Orlando Pride
15	FW	Emily Gielnik	13 May 1992 (aged 26)	18	4	(Football Australia) Brisbane Roar
16	FW	Hayley Raso	5 September 1994 (aged 23)	25	2	(United States Soccer Federation) Portland Thorns
17	FW	Kyah Simon	25 June 1991 (aged 27)	83	22	(United States Soccer Federation) Houston Dash
18	GK	Mackenzie Arnold	25 February 1994 (aged 24)	19	0	(Norwegian Football Federation) Arna-Bjørnar
19	MF	Katrina Gorry	13 August 1992 (aged 25)	68	14	(United States Soccer Federation) Utah Royals
20	FW	Sam Kerr	10 September 1993 (aged 24)	67	24	(United States Soccer Federation) Chicago Red Stars
21	DF	Ellie Carpenter	28 April 2000 (aged 18)	21	1	(United States Soccer Federation) Portland Thorns
22	FW	Larissa Crummer	10 January 1996 (aged 22)	20	4	(Football Australia) Newcastle Jets
23	MF	Alex Chidiac	15 January 1999 (aged 19)	10	1	(Royal Spanish Football Federation) Atlético Madrid

=== Brazil ===
Coach: Vadão

The final squad was announced on 21 July 2018.

No.	Pos.	Player	Date of birth (age)	Caps	Goals	Club
1	GK	Bárbara	4 July 1988 (aged 30)			(Brazilian Football Confederation) Kindermann
2	FW	Millene	13 December 1994 (aged 23)			(Brazilian Football Confederation) Corinthians
3	DF	Daiane	7 September 1997 (aged 20)			(Norwegian Football Federation) Avaldsnes
4	DF	Kathellen	26 April 1996 (aged 22)			(French Football Federation) Bordeaux
5	MF	Thaisa	17 December 1988 (aged 29)			(United States Soccer Federation) Sky Blue
6	DF	Tamires	10 October 1987 (aged 30)			(Danish Football Association) Fortuna Hjørring
7	MF	Camila	10 October 1994 (aged 23)			(United States Soccer Federation) Orlando Pride
8	MF	Juliana	22 December 1991 (aged 26)			(Brazilian Football Confederation) Flamengo
9	FW	Debinha	20 October 1991 (aged 26)			(United States Soccer Federation) North Carolina Courage
10	FW	Marta	19 February 1986 (aged 32)			(United States Soccer Federation) Orlando Pride
11	FW	Adriana	17 November 1996 (aged 21)			(Brazilian Football Confederation) Corinthians
12	GK	Aline	15 April 1989 (aged 29)			(Royal Spanish Football Federation) Tenerife
13	DF	Rilany	26 June 1986 (aged 32)			(Royal Spanish Football Federation) Atlético Madrid
14	DF	Poliana	6 February 1991 (aged 27)			(United States Soccer Federation) Orlando Pride
15	DF	Tayla	9 May 1992 (aged 26)			(Brazilian Football Confederation) Santos
16	FW	Beatriz	17 December 1993 (aged 24)			(Korea Football Association) Incheon Hyundai Steel Red Angels
17	MF	Andressinha	1 May 1995 (aged 23)			(United States Soccer Federation) Portland Thorns
18	FW	Thaís	20 January 1993 (aged 25)			(Korea Football Association) Incheon Hyundai Steel Red Angels
19	DF	Joyce	22 March 1988 (aged 30)			(Royal Spanish Football Federation) Tenerife
20	FW	Raquel	21 March 1991 (aged 27)			(Brazilian Football Confederation) Ferroviária
21	DF	Mônica	21 April 1987 (aged 31)			(United States Soccer Federation) Orlando Pride
22	GK	Letícia Izidoro	13 August 1994 (aged 23)			(Brazilian Football Confederation) Corinthians
23	MF	Rayanne	16 June 1994 (aged 24)			(Brazilian Football Confederation) Flamengo

=== Japan ===
Coach: Asako Takakura

The final squad was announced on 13 July 2018. On 23 July 2018, Rumi Utsugi, Nana Ichise, and Hikaru Naomoto withdrew from the squad due to injuries and were replaced with Mayo Doko and Hina Sugita.

No.	Pos.	Player	Date of birth (age)	Caps	Goals	Club
1	GK	Sakiko Ikeda	8 September 1992 (aged 25)			(Japan Football Association) Urawa Red Diamonds
2	DF	Mayo Doko	3 May 1996 (aged 22)			(Japan Football Association) Nippon TV Beleza
3	DF	Aya Sameshima	16 June 1987 (aged 31)			(Japan Football Association) INAC Kobe Leonessa
4	DF	Shiori Miyake	13 October 1995 (aged 22)			(Japan Football Association) INAC Kobe Leonessa
6	DF	Saori Ariyoshi	1 November 1987 (aged 30)			(Japan Football Association) Nippon TV Beleza
7	MF	Emi Nakajima	27 September 1990 (aged 27)			(Japan Football Association) INAC Kobe Leonessa
8	FW	Mana Iwabuchi	18 March 1993 (aged 25)			(Japan Football Association) INAC Kobe Leonessa
9	FW	Nahomi Kawasumi	23 September 1985 (aged 32)			(United States Soccer Federation) Seattle Reign
11	FW	Mina Tanaka	28 April 1994 (aged 24)			(Japan Football Association) Nippon TV Beleza
12	MF	Hina Sugita	31 January 1997 (aged 21)			(Japan Football Association) INAC Kobe Leonessa
13	FW	Yuika Sugasawa	5 October 1990 (aged 27)			(Japan Football Association) Urawa Red Diamonds
14	MF	Yui Hasegawa	29 January 1997 (aged 21)			(Japan Football Association) Nippon TV Beleza
15	MF	Moeno Sakaguchi	4 June 1992 (aged 26)			(Japan Football Association) Albirex Niigata
16	MF	Rin Sumida	12 January 1996 (aged 22)			(Japan Football Association) Nippon TV Beleza
17	MF	Yuka Momiki	9 April 1996 (aged 22)			(Japan Football Association) Nippon TV Beleza
18	GK	Ayaka Yamashita	29 September 1995 (aged 22)			(Japan Football Association) Nippon TV Beleza
19	MF	Rika Masuya	14 September 1995 (aged 22)			(Japan Football Association) INAC Kobe Leonessa
20	FW	Kumi Yokoyama	13 August 1993 (aged 24)			(Japan Football Association) AC Nagano Parceiro
21	GK	Chika Hirao	31 December 1996 (aged 21)			(Japan Football Association) Albirex Niigata
22	DF	Risa Shimizu	15 June 1996 (aged 22)			(Japan Football Association) Nippon TV Beleza
23	DF	Aimi Kunitake	10 January 1997 (aged 21)	0	0	(Japan Football Association) Nojima Stella Kanagawa Sagamihara
24	MF	Narumi Miura	3 July 1997 (aged 21)			(Japan Football Association) Nippon TV Beleza

=== United States ===
Coach: Jill Ellis

The final squad was announced on 23 July 2018.

No.	Pos.	Player	Date of birth (age)	Caps	Goals	Club
1	GK	Alyssa Naeher	April 20, 1988 (aged 30)	29	0	(United States Soccer Federation) Chicago Red Stars
2	MF	Julie Ertz	April 6, 1992 (aged 26)	61	15	(United States Soccer Federation) Chicago Red Stars
3	MF	Sam Mewis	October 9, 1992 (aged 25)	36	7	(United States Soccer Federation) North Carolina Courage
4	DF	Becky Sauerbrunn	June 6, 1985 (aged 33)	139	0	(United States Soccer Federation) Utah Royals
5	MF	McCall Zerboni	December 13, 1986 (aged 31)	2	0	(United States Soccer Federation) North Carolina Courage
6	MF	Morgan Brian	February 26, 1993 (aged 25)	75	6	(United States Soccer Federation) Chicago Red Stars
7	DF	Abby Dahlkemper	May 13, 1993 (aged 25)	19	0	(United States Soccer Federation) North Carolina Courage
8	FW	Amy Rodriguez	February 17, 1987 (aged 31)	131	30	(United States Soccer Federation) Utah Royals
9	MF	Lindsey Horan	May 26, 1994 (aged 24)	51	5	(United States Soccer Federation) Portland Thorns
10	MF	Carli Lloyd	July 16, 1982 (aged 36)	254	100	(United States Soccer Federation) Sky Blue
11	DF	Merritt Mathias	July 2, 1990 (aged 28)	1	0	(United States Soccer Federation) North Carolina Courage
12	DF	Tierna Davidson	September 19, 1998 (aged 19)	8	0	(United States Soccer Federation) Stanford Cardinal
13	FW	Alex Morgan	July 2, 1989 (aged 29)	142	86	(United States Soccer Federation) Orlando Pride
14	DF	Casey Short	August 23, 1990 (aged 27)	21	0	(United States Soccer Federation) Chicago Red Stars
15	FW	Megan Rapinoe	July 5, 1985 (aged 33)	137	37	(United States Soccer Federation) Seattle Reign
16	MF	Rose Lavelle	May 14, 1995 (aged 23)	8	2	(United States Soccer Federation) Washington Spirit
17	FW	Tobin Heath	May 29, 1988 (aged 30)	133	19	(United States Soccer Federation) Portland Thorns
19	FW	Crystal Dunn	July 3, 1992 (aged 26)	64	23	(United States Soccer Federation) North Carolina Courage
20	MF	Allie Long	August 13, 1987 (aged 30)	39	6	(United States Soccer Federation) Seattle Reign
21	GK	Adrianna Franch	November 12, 1990 (aged 27)	0	0	(United States Soccer Federation) Portland Thorns
22	DF	Emily Sonnett	November 25, 1993 (aged 24)	17	0	(United States Soccer Federation) Portland Thorns
23	FW	Christen Press	December 29, 1988 (aged 29)	100	44	(United States Soccer Federation) Utah Royals
24	GK	Ashlyn Harris	October 19, 1985 (aged 32)	16	0	(United States Soccer Federation) Orlando Pride

== Player representation ==
=== By club ===
Clubs with 3 or more players represented are listed.

Players	Club
9	(Japan) Nippon TV Beleza
8	(United States) Orlando Pride, (United States) Portland Thorns
6	(Japan) INAC Kobe Leonessa, (United States) North Carolina Courage
5	(United States) Chicago Red Stars
4	(United States) Seattle Reign, (United States) Utah Royals
3	(Brazil) Corinthians

=== By club nationality ===
Players	Clubs
41	United States
21	Japan
8	Brazil
7	Australia
4	Spain
3	Norway
2	South Korea
1	Denmark, France, Sweden

=== By club federation ===
Players	Federation
41	CONCACAF
30	AFC
10	UEFA
8	CONMEBOL

=== By representatives of domestic league ===
National squad	Players
United States	23
Japan	21
Brazil	8
Australia	7
