= Ichihara (surname) =

Ichihara (written: 市原) is a Japanese surname. Notable people with the surname include:

- Etsuko Ichihara (市原 悦子, 1936–2019), Japanese actress
- Hayato Ichihara (市原 隼人, born 1987), Japanese actor
- Hiroshi Ichihara (市原 大嗣, born 1987), Japanese footballer
- Kodai Ichihara (市原 弘大, born 1982), Japanese golfer
- Masao Ichihara (市原 正雄, born 1913), Japanese sprinter
- Mitsuki Ichihara (市原 充喜, born 1986), Japanese footballer
- Seiki Ichihara (市原 聖曠), Japanese football and manager
- Takayuki Ichihara (市原 孝行), Japanese sumo wrestler
- Taro Ichihara (市原 多朗, born 1950), Japanese opera singer
- Tatsuhiko Ichihara (市原 建彦, born 1978), Japanese golfer

== Fictional characters ==
- Yūko Ichihara (壱原 侑子), a character in the manga series xxxHolic
