= Ryohei Suzuki (footballer) =

Japanese footballer and manager

Ryohei Suzuki 鈴木 良平
Personal information
- Full name: Ryohei Suzuki
- Date of birth: June 12, 1949 (age 77)
- Place of birth: Japan

Youth career
- Years: Team
- Tokai University

Managerial career
- 1986–1989: Japan Women
- 1990–1991: Nikko Securities Dream Ladies

Ryohei Suzuki (鈴木 良平, Suzuki Ryōhei; born June 12, 1949) is a former Japanese football player and manager. He managed Japan women's national team.

== Coaching career ==
Suzuki was born on June 12, 1949. After graduating from Tokai University, he went to West Germany in 1973 and became a coach. In January 1986, he became a manager for Japan women's national team. In December, Japan participated in 1986 AFC Women's Championship in Hong Kong and won the 2nd place. He managed Japan until January 1989. In 1990, he became a manager for new club Nikko Securities Dream Ladies. The club won the champions at 1990 Empress's Cup. The club participated L.League from 1991. The club was 4th place in 1991 season and he resigned end of the season.
