= Takao Orii =

Japanese footballer and manager

Takao Orii 折井 孝男
Personal information
- Full name: Takao Orii
- Place of birth: Japan

Managerial career
- Years: Team
- 1984: Japan Women

Takao Orii (折井 孝男, Orii Takao) is a former Japanese football player and manager. He managed Japan women's national team.

== Coaching career ==
In October 1984, Japan women's national team was formed for the first time in three years for a China expedition, and Japan Football Association appointed Orii as Japan national team manager. Japan played 3 matches against Italy and Australia in Xi'an. However Japan lost in all matches.

== Result ==
Date	Venue	Opponent	Result
Oct 17, 1984	Xi'an, China	Italy	0–6
Oct 22, 1984	Xi'an, China	Australia	2–6
Oct 24, 1984	Xi'an, China	Italy	1–5
