= Jhuo Li-shan =

Taiwanese footballer (born 1996)

Personal information
- Date of birth: 20 October 1996 (age 30)
- Place of birth: Hualien, Taiwan
- Height: 1.64 m (5 ft 5 in)
- Position: Midfielder

Team information
- Current team: Hualien
- Number: 6

Senior career*
Years	Team	Apps	(Gls)
- Hualien

International career^{‡}
2016–	Chinese Taipei	19	(0)
- * Club domestic league appearances and goals ‡ National team caps and goals as of 10 February 2020

Jhuo Li-shan (Chinese: 卓莉珊; born 20 October 1996) is a Taiwanese footballer who plays as a midfielder for Taiwan Mulan Football League club Hualien FC and the Chinese Taipei women's national team.

== International career ==
Jhuo Li-shan represented Chinese Taipei at two AFC U-19 Women's Championship editions (2013 and 2015). She capped at senior level during two EAFF E-1 Football Championship editions (2017 and 2019), the 2018 AFC Women's Asian Cup qualification, the 2018 Asian Games and the 2020 AFC Women's Olympic Qualifying Tournament.
