= Seiki Ichihara =

Japanese footballer and manager

Seiki Ichihara 市原 聖曠
Personal information
- Full name: Seiki Ichihara
- Place of birth: Japan

Managerial career
- Years: Team
- 1981: Japan Women

Seiki Ichihara (市原 聖曠, Ichihara Seiki) is a former Japanese football player and manager. He managed Japan women's national team.

== Coaching career ==
In June 1981, the Japan Football Association formed the first Japan women's national team for the 1981 AFC Women's Championship in Hong Kong. The Japan Football Association appointed Ichihara as the first Japan national team manager. The first match of this tournament was on June 7, and Japan played against Chinese Taipei. This match was the Japan team's first match in an International A Match. However, Japan lost this match (0–1) and its second match, against Thailand (0–2), on June 11. The third match, against Indonesia, was on June 13, and Japan won 1–0 with Etsuko Handa's goal. This was the Japan team's first victory.

In September, the team played two matches in Japan. However, they lost in both games, against England (0–4) and Italy (0–9). The match against Italy was the greatest loss in the history of the Japan national team.

== Result ==
Date	Venue	Opponent	Result	Tournament
Jun 7, 1981	Hong Kong	Chinese Taipei	0–1	1981 AFC Women's Championship
Jun 11, 1981	Hong Kong	Thailand	0–2	1981 AFC Women's Championship
Jun 13, 1981	Hong Kong	Indonesia	1–0	1981 AFC Women's Championship
Sep 6, 1981	Kobe Central Football Stadium, Kobe, Japan	England	0–4	Portopia'81
Sep 9, 1981	Ajinomoto Field Nishigaoka, Tokyo, Japan	Italy	0–9	Portopia'81
