= Isabella Lee =

Taiwanese footballer

Personal information
- Full name: Lee Wan-chen
- Date of birth: 22 November 1997 (age 28)
- Place of birth: Kaohsiung City, Taiwan
- Height: 1.57 m (5 ft 2 in)
- Position: Defender

Team information
- Current team: Kaohsiung Sunny Bank

Youth career
- Morrison Academy Taichung IMG Academy

College career
Years	Team	Apps	(Gls)
2016–2019	UC Riverside Highlanders	32	(1)

Senior career*
Years	Team	Apps	(Gls)
2020–	Kaohsiung Sunny Bank		

International career^{‡}
2019–	Chinese Taipei	3	(0)
- * Club domestic league appearances and goals as of 20 October 2019 ‡ National team caps and goals as of 10 February 2020

Lee Wan-chen (Chinese: 李宛珍; born 22 November 1997), known as Isabella Lee, is a Taiwanese footballer who plays as a defender for Taiwan Mulan Football League club Kaohsiung Sunny Bank and the Chinese Taipei women's national team.
