= Lee Eun-mi (footballer) =

South Korean footballer

Lee Eun-mi 이은미
Personal information
- Date of birth: 18 August 1988 (age 38)
- Place of birth: South Korea,
- Height: 1.70 m (5 ft 7 in)
- Position: Defender

College career
| Years | Team | Apps | (Gls) |
- Gangwon Provincial College

Senior career*
| Years | Team | Apps | (Gls) |
| 2009-2017 | Icheon Daekyo | | |
| 2018–2025 | Suwon FC | 18 | (2) |

International career^{‡}
| 2007–2019 | South Korea | 91 | (14) |
- * Club domestic league appearances and goals ‡ National team caps and goals as of 02:58, 29 April 2026 (UTC)

- Lee Eun-mi
- Hangul: 이은미
- RR: I Eunmi
- MR: I Ŭnmi

Lee Eun-mi (Korean pronunciation: [i.ɯn.mi]; born 18 August 1988) is a South Korean former professional footballer who played as a defender. She represented South Korea at several major tournaments, including two World Cups, two Asian Games, and three Asian Cups. Lee currently works as a coach for Suwon FC Women.

== Club career ==
Lee joined Daekyo Kangaroos (later Icheon Daekyo) in 2009 and won three WK League titles with the club between 2009 and 2012.

Following the disbandment of Icheon Daekyo in 2017, Lee joined Suwon UDC. On 23 April 2018, she made her debut for the club in a 1–0 victory against Changnyeong. Lee retired from football at the end of the 2025 season, having made 280 WK League appearances over 16 seasons in the league.

== International career ==
During her career, Lee made 91 appearances for South Korea, scoring 14 international goals. She was part of the country's bronze medal-winning squad at both the 2010 and 2018 Asian Games, as well as appearing at two World Cups, in 2015 and 2019. Following her retirement from international football, in 2025 she was honoured with a retirement ceremony alongside Yoo Young-a.

== Coaching career ==
In 2025, Lee was a playing coach at Suwon FC. After fully retiring from playing at the end of the season, she remained at the club as a coach for the 2026 WK League season.

== Honours ==
=== Icheon Daekyo ===
- WK League
  - Champions: 2009, 2011, 2012

=== Suwon FC ===
- WK League
  - Champions: 2024

=== South Korea ===
- Asian Games
  - Bronze medal: 2010, 2018
