= United States women's national soccer team results (2020–present) =

== 2020s ==
=== 2020 ===
January 28 Olympic Qualifying	United States	4–0	Haiti	Houston, TX
19:30 CT	Press 2'; Lavelle (yellow card) 62'; Williams 67'; Horan 73'; Lloyd 90+3'	Report		Stadium: BBVA Stadium; Attendance: 4,363; Referee: Odette Hamilton (Jamaica)

January 31 Olympic Qualifying	Panama	0–8	United States	Houston, TX
19:30 CT		Report	Horan 3', 18', 81'; Williams 16'; Lavelle 21'; Press 70'; McDonald 72'; Heath 79'	Stadium: BBVA Stadium; Attendance: 14,121; Referee: Myriam Marcotte (Canada)

February 3 Olympic Qualifying	United States	6–0	Costa Rica	Houston, TX
19:30 CT	Press 4', 36'; Horan 10'; Mewis 63', 82'; McDonald 77'	Report	Elizondo (yellow card) 61'	Stadium: BBVA Stadium; Attendance: 7,082; Referee: Francia González (Mexico)

February 7 Olympic Qualifying Semifinal	United States	4–0	Mexico	Carson, CA
22:00 ET	Lavelle 5'; Mewis 14', 67'; Press 74'	Report	Sierra (yellow card) 65'	Stadium: Dignity Health Sports Park; Attendance: 11,292; Referee: Melissa Borjas (Honduras)

February 9 Olympic Qualifying Final	Canada	0–3	United States	Carson, CA
18:00 ET		Report	Williams 60'; Horan 71'; Rapinoe 87'	Stadium: Dignity Health Sports Park; Attendance: 17,489; Referee: Tatiana Guzmán (Nicaragua)

March 5 SheBelieves Cup	United States	2–0	England	Orlando, FL
19:00 ET	Press 53'; Lloyd 55'	Report		Stadium: Exploria Stadium; Attendance: 16,531; Referee: Odette Hamilton (Jamaica)

March 8 SheBelieves Cup	United States	1–0	Spain	Harrison, NJ
17:00 ET	Ertz 87'	Report		Stadium: Red Bull Arena; Attendance: 26,500; Referee: Katia García (Mexico)

March 11 SheBelieves Cup	United States	3–1	Japan	Frisco, TX
18:00 CT	Rapinoe 7'; Press 26'; Heath (yellow card) 50'; Horan 83'	Report	Tanaka (yellow card) 5'; Iwabuchi 58'; Ueki (yellow card) 90+2'	Stadium: Toyota Stadium; Attendance: 19,096; Referee: Melissa Borjas (Honduras)

April 10 Friendly	United States	Cancelled	Australia	Sandy, UT
19:30 MT		Report		Stadium: Rio Tinto Stadium

April 14 Friendly	United States	Cancelled	Brazil	San Jose, CA
19:00 PT		Report		Stadium: Earthquakes Stadium

November 27 Friendly	Netherlands	0–2	United States	Breda, Netherlands
12:35 ET		Report	Lavelle 41'; Mewis 70'	Stadium: Rat Verlegh Stadion; Attendance: 0 (played behind closed doors); Referee: Julia Demetrescu (Romania)

=== 2021 ===
January 18 Friendly	United States	4–0	Colombia	Orlando, FL
19:00 ET	S. Mewis 4', 33', 46' (pen.); K. Mewis 85'	Report	Pavi (yellow card) 23'; Romero (yellow card) 40'	Stadium: Exploria Stadium; Attendance: 2,042; Referee: Karen Abt (United States)

January 22 Friendly	United States	6–0	Colombia	Orlando, FL
19:00 ET	Macario 3'; Rapinoe 35', 44' (pen.); Williams 60'; Horan 73'; Krieger (yellow card) 78'; Purce 86'	Report	Velásquez (yellow card) 39'; Romero (yellow card) 54'	Stadium: Exploria Stadium; Attendance: 3,202; Referee: Danielle Chesky (United States)

February 18 SheBelieves Cup	United States	1–0	Canada	Orlando, FL
19:00 ET	Lavelle 79'	Report		Stadium: Exploria Stadium; Attendance: 3,104; Referee: Francia Gonzalez (Mexico)

February 21 SheBelieves Cup	United States	2–0	Brazil	Orlando, FL
15:00 ET	Press 11'; Horan (yellow card) 52'; Rapinoe 88'	Report	Bruna (yellow card) 33'; Tamires (yellow card) 58'; Ludmila (yellow card) 80'	Stadium: Exploria Stadium; Attendance: 4,000; Referee: Melissa Borjas (Honduras)

February 24 SheBelieves Cup	United States	6–0	Argentina	Orlando, FL
19:00 ET	Rapinoe 16', 26'; Lloyd 35'; Mewis 41'; Morgan 84'; Press 88'	Report	Núñez (yellow card) 27'; Santana (yellow card) 72'; Ippólito (yellow card) 90'	Stadium: Exploria Stadium; Attendance: 3,702; Referee: Marianela Araya Cruz (Costa Rica)

April 10 Friendly	Sweden	1–1	United States	Stockholm, Sweden
13:00 ET	Hurtig 38'	Report	O'Hara (yellow card) 69'; Rapinoe 87' (pen.)	Stadium: Friends Arena; Attendance: 0 (no fans allowed); Referee: Lina Lehtovaara (Finland)

April 13 Friendly	France	0–2	United States	Le Havre, France
15:00 ET	Torrent (yellow card) 36'; Kazadi (yellow card) 73'	Report	Rapinoe 5' (pen.); Morgan 19'; Lloyd (yellow card) 83'	Stadium: Stade Océane; Attendance: 0 (no fans allowed); Referee: Riem Hussein (Germany)

June 10 Friendly	United States	1–0	Portugal	Houston, TX
20:30 ET	S. Mewis 76'	Report	Silva (yellow card) 49'	Stadium: BBVA Stadium; Attendance: 9,951; Referee: Danielle Chesky (United States)

June 13 Friendly	United States	4–0	Jamaica	Houston, TX
22:00 ET	Lloyd 1'; Horan 7' (pen.); Purce 22'; Morgan 90+2'	Report	Campbell (yellow card) 61'	Stadium: BBVA Stadium; Attendance: 8,737; Referee: Karen Abt (United States)

June 16 Friendly	United States	2–0	Nigeria	Austin, TX
21:00 ET	K. Mewis (yellow card) 26'; Press 45+2'; Sonnett (yellow card) 79'; Williams 90+4'	Report	Okoronkwo (yellow card) 49'; Okeke (yellow card) 57'	Stadium: Q2 Stadium; Attendance: 20,500; Referee: Katja Koroleva (United States)

July 1 Friendly	United States	4–0	Mexico	East Hartford, CT
20:00 ET	S. Mewis 21'; Press 39', 85'; Heath 74'	Report		Stadium: Pratt & Whitney Stadium at Rentschler Field; Attendance: 21,637; Referee: Katja Koroleva (United States)

July 5 Friendly	United States	4–0	Mexico	East Hartford, CT
18:00 ET	Horan 6'; Lloyd 11'; Reyes 37' (o.g.); Heath 39'	Report	Reyes (yellow card) 60'	Stadium: Pratt & Whitney Stadium at Rentschler Field; Attendance: 27,758; Referee: Danielle Chesky (United States)

July 21 Olympics	Sweden	3–0	United States	Tokyo, Japan
04:30 ET	Blackstenius 25', 54'; Hurtig 72'	Report		Stadium: Tokyo Stadium; Attendance: 0 (behind closed doors); Referee: Yoshimi Yamashita (Japan)

July 24 Olympics	New Zealand	1–6	United States	Saitama, Japan
07:30 ET	Hassett 72'	Report	Lavelle 9'; Horan 45'; Erceg 63' (o.g.); Press 80'; Morgan 88'; Bott 90+3' (o.g.)	Stadium: Saitama Stadium; Attendance: None; Referee: Stéphanie Frappart (France)

July 27 Olympics	United States	0–0	Australia	Kashima, Japan
04:00 ET	Rapinoe (yellow card) 38'; Lavelle (yellow card) 72'	Report	Cooney-Cross (yellow card) 69'	Stadium: Kashima Stadium; Attendance: None; Referee: Anastasia Pustovoitova (Russia)

July 30 Olympics Quarterfinal	Netherlands	2–2 (a.e.t.) (2–4 p)	United States	Yokohama, Japan
07:00 ET	Miedema 18', 54'; Van de Donk (yellow card) 90+4'	Report	S. Mewis 28'; Williams 31'; Horan (yellow card) 77'; O'Hara (yellow card) 115'	Stadium: International Stadium Yokohama; Attendance: None; Referee: Kate Jacewicz (Australia)
	Penalties
	Miedema (penalty missed); Janssen (penalty scored); Van der Gragt (penalty scored); Nouwen (penalty missed)		(penalty scored) Lavelle; (penalty scored) Morgan; (penalty scored) Press; (penalty scored) Rapinoe

August 2 Olympics Semifinal	United States	0–1	Canada	Kashima, Japan
04:00 ET	O'Hara (yellow card) 32'	Report	Fleming 75' (pen.)	Stadium: Kashima Stadium; Attendance: None; Referee: Kateryna Monzul (Ukraine)

August 5 Olympics Bronze Medal Match	Australia	3–4	United States	Kashima, Japan
04:00 ET	Kerr 17'; Foord 54'; Gielnik 90'	Report	Rapinoe 8', 21'; Lloyd 45+1', 51'	Stadium: Kashima Stadium; Attendance: None; Referee: Laura Fortunato (Argentina)

September 16 Friendly	United States	9–0	Paraguay	Cleveland, OH
19:30 ET	Lloyd 3', 6', 34', 38', 61'; Sullivan 25', 49'; Williams 30'; Heath 86'	Report		Stadium: FirstEnergy Stadium; Attendance: 14,117; Referee: Karen Abt (United States)

September 21 Friendly	United States	8–0	Paraguay	Cincinnati, OH
19:30 ET	Lavelle 4'; Smith 6'; Morgan 8', 14', 53'; Macario 15', 82'; Lloyd 78'	Report		Stadium: TQL Stadium; Attendance: 22,515; Referee: Danielle Chesky (United States)

October 21 Friendly	United States	0–0	South Korea	Kansas City, KS
20:00 ET	Horan (yellow card) 77'	Report		Stadium: Children's Mercy Park; Attendance: 18,467; Referee: Katja Koroleva (United States)

October 26 Friendly	United States	6–0	South Korea	Saint Paul, MN
20:00 ET	Horan 9'; Sullivan (yellow card) 41'; Cho So-hyun 45' (o.g.); Morgan 70'; Rapinoe 85'; Lavelle 89'; Williams 90+2'	Report		Stadium: Allianz Field; Attendance: 18,115; Referee: Karen Abt (United States)

November 26 Friendly	Australia	0–3	United States	Sydney, Australia
23:00 ET		Report	Hatch 1' (yellow card) 74'; Lavelle 49'; Horan 68' (pen.)	Stadium: Stadium Australia; Attendance: 36,109; Referee: Hyeon Jeong Oh (South Korea)

November 30 Friendly	Australia	1–1	United States	Newcastle, Australia
04:05 ET	Simon 88'	Report	Hatch 4'; Horan (yellow card) 81'	Stadium: McDonald Jones Stadium; Attendance: 20,495; Referee: Seijin Park (South Korea)

=== 2022 ===
February 17 SheBelieves Cup	United States	0–0	Czech Republic	Carson, CA
23:00 ET		Report	Cahynová (yellow card) 58'	Stadium: Dignity Health Sports Park; Attendance: 7,333; Referee: Laura Fortunato (Argentina)

February 20 SheBelieves Cup	United States	5–0	New Zealand	Carson, CA
15:00 ET	Moore 5', 6', 36' (o.g.); Hatch 51'; Pugh 90+3'	Report	Bott (yellow card) 12'; Bunge (yellow card) 70'	Stadium: Dignity Health Sports Park; Attendance: 16,587; Referee: María Carvajal (Chile)

February 23 SheBelieves Cup	United States	5–0	Iceland	Frisco, TX
21:00 ET	Macario 37', 45'; Pugh 60', 75'; K. Mewis 88'	Report	Vilhjálmsdóttir (yellow card) 87'	Stadium: Toyota Stadium; Attendance: 7,444; Referee: Edina Alves Batista (Brazil)

April 9 Friendly	United States	9–1	Uzbekistan	Columbus, OH
17:30 ET	Sullivan 26'; Pugh 27'; Smith 33', 35', 56'; Macario 46'; Macario (yellow card) 53'; Howell 64'; Hatch 86'; Sanchez 90'	Report	Norboeva 70'	Stadium: Lower.com Field; Attendance: 12,071; Referee: Katja Koroleva (United States)

April 12 Friendly	United States	9–0	Uzbekistan	Chester, PA
19:00 ET	Zaripova 1' (o.g.); Macario 12', 47'; Pugh 14'; Lavelle 25', 27'; Rodman 71'; Purce 84'; Sanchez 90'	Report	Zaripova (yellow card) 62'; Kamoltoeva (yellow card) 84'	Stadium: Subaru Park; Attendance: 11,373; Referee: Natalie Simon (United States)

June 25 Friendly	United States	3–0	Colombia	Commerce City, CO
19:30 ET	Smith 54', 60'; Kornieck 90'	Report		Stadium: Dick's Sporting Goods Park; Attendance: 17,143; Referee: Carly Shaw-Maclaren (Canada)

June 28 Friendly	United States	2–0	Colombia	Sandy, UT
22:00 ET	Vanegas 22' (o.g.); Lavelle (yellow card) 60'; O'Hara 77'; Hatch (yellow card) 90+3'	Report		Stadium: Rio Tinto Stadium; Attendance: 16,077; Referee: Katja Koroleva (United States)

July 4 CONCACAF Championship	United States	3–0	Haiti	San Nicolás de los Garza, Mexico
19:00 ET	Morgan 16', 23'; Fox (yellow card) 40'; Purce 84'	Report	Roselord Borgella (yellow card) 45'	Stadium: Estadio Universitario; Attendance: 5,345; Referee: Marie-Soleil Beaudoin (Canada)

July 7 CONCACAF Championship	Jamaica	0–5	United States	Guadalupe, Mexico
19:00 ET	Blackwood (yellow card) 43'; Swaby (yellow card) 90+4'	Report	Smith 5', 8'; Sanchez (yellow card) 45+4'; Lavelle 59'; Mewis 83' (pen.); Rodman 86'	Stadium: Estadio BBVA; Attendance: 3,150; Referee: Melissa Borjas (Honduras)

July 11 CONCACAF Championship	United States	1–0	Mexico	San Nicolás de los Garza, Mexico
22:00 ET	Mewis 89'	Report	Ferral (yellow card) 34'; Robles (yellow card) 68'; Ovalle (red card) 73'	Stadium: Estadio Universitario; Attendance: 20,522; Referee: Myriam Marcotte (Canada)

July 14 CONCACAF Championship Semifinal	United States	3–0	Costa Rica	San Nicolás de los Garza, Mexico
19:00 ET	Sonnett 34'; Pugh 45+3'; Lavelle (yellow card) 70'; Rapinoe (yellow card) 84'; Sanchez 90+5'	Report	Cruz (yellow card) 53'	Stadium: Estadio Universitario; Attendance: 2,537; Referee: Astrid Gramajo (Guatemala)

July 18 CONCACAF Championship Final	United States	1–0	Canada	Guadalupe, Mexico
22:00 ET	Horan (yellow card) 41'; Morgan 78' (pen.)	Report	Sinclair (yellow card) 46'	Stadium: Estadio BBVA; Attendance: 17,247; Referee: Katia García (Mexico)

September 3 Friendly	United States	4–0	Nigeria	Kansas City, KS
13:00 ET	Smith 14', 45+1'; Horan 25'; Morgan 52' (pen.)	Report	Abiodun (yellow card) 28'; Ohale (yellow card) 40'	Stadium: Children's Mercy Park; Attendance: 14,502; Referee: Melissa Borjas (Honduras)

September 6 Friendly	United States	2–1	Nigeria	Washington, D.C.
18:00 ET	Demehin 24' (o.g.); Lavelle 66'	Report	Kanu 50'; Ajibade (yellow card) 85'	Stadium: Audi Field; Attendance: 18,869; Referee: Odette Hamilton (Jamaica)

October 7 Friendly	England	2–1	United States	London, England
15:00 ET	Hemp 10'; Stanway 33' (pen.); Bright (yellow card) 45'	Report	Smith 28'; Mace (yellow card) 32'; Rodman (yellow card) 48'	Stadium: Wembley Stadium; Attendance: 76,893; Referee: Riem Hussein (Germany)

October 11 Friendly	Spain	2–0	United States	Pamplona, Spain
14:30 ET	Codina 39'; González 72'	Report	Rapinoe (yellow card) 53'; Thompson (yellow card) 74'	Stadium: El Sadar Stadium; Attendance: 11,209; Referee: Deborah Bianchi (Italy)

November 10 Friendly	United States	1–2	Germany	Fort Lauderdale, FL
19:00 ET	Rapinoe 85'	Report	Murphy 52' (o.g.); Krumbiegel 89'	Stadium: DRV PNK Stadium; Attendance: 16,917; Referee: Odette Hamilton (Jamaica)

November 13 Friendly	United States	2–1	Germany	Harrison, NJ
17:00 ET	Smith 54'; Pugh 56'	Report	Kleinherne (yellow card) 15'; Brand 18'; Hendrich (yellow card) 84'	Stadium: Red Bull Arena; Attendance: 26,317; Referee: Marianela Araya Cruz (Costa Rica)

=== 2023 ===
January 17 Friendly	New Zealand	0–4	United States	Wellington, New Zealand
22:00 ET		Report	Swanson 52', 63'; Morgan 60'; Williams 74'	Stadium: Wellington Regional Stadium; Attendance: 12,508; Referee: Kate Jacewicz (Australia)

January 20 Friendly	New Zealand	0–5	United States	Auckland, New Zealand
22:00 ET		Report	Hatch 22'; Lavelle 39', 74'; Swanson 53'; Williams (yellow card) 71'; Kornieck 80'	Stadium: Eden Park; Attendance: 12,721; Referee: Lara Lee (Australia)

February 16 SheBelieves Cup	United States	2–0	Canada	Orlando, FL
19:00 ET	Swanson 7', 34'	Report	Fleming (yellow card) 64'; Hellstrom (yellow card) 82'	Stadium: Exploria Stadium; Attendance: 14,697; Referee: Katia Garcia (Mexico}

February 19 SheBelieves Cup	United States	1–0	Japan	Nashville, TN
15:30 ET	Swanson 45'; Kornieck (yellow card) 85'	Report		Stadium: Geodis Park; Attendance: 25,471; Referee: Myriam Marcotte (Canada)

February 22 SheBelieves Cup	United States	2–1	Brazil	Frisco, TX
19:00 ET	Sullivan (yellow card) 41'; Morgan 45+3'; Swanson 63'	Report	Kerolin (yellow card) 34'; Adriana (yellow card) 70'; Ludmila 90'	Stadium: Toyota Stadium; Attendance: 17,784; Referee: Marie-Soleil Beaudoin (Canada)

April 8 Friendly	United States	2–0	Republic of Ireland	Austin, TX
14:30 ET	Fox 37'; Ertz (yellow card) 72'; Horan 80' (pen.)	Report	Mannion (yellow card) 25'	Stadium: Q2 Stadium; Attendance: 20,593; Referee: Carly Shaw-MacLaren (Canada)

April 11 Friendly	United States	1–0	Republic of Ireland	St. Louis, MO
19:30 ET	Cook 43'	Report	Littlejohn (yellow card) 57'; Connolly (yellow card) 90+7'	Stadium: CityPark; Attendance: 22,294; Referee: Crystal Sobers (Trinidad and Tobago)

July 9 Friendly	United States	2–0	Wales	San Jose, CA
16:00 ET	Rodman 76', 87'	Report	Green (yellow card) 53'; Holland (yellow card) 82'	Stadium: PayPal Park; Attendance: 18,000; Referee: Karen Hernández (Mexico)

July 21 World Cup	United States	3–0	Vietnam	Auckland, New Zealand
21:00 ET	Smith 15', 45+7'; Horan (yellow card) 56', (goal) 77'	Report	Huỳnh (yellow card) 75'	Stadium: Eden Park; Attendance: 41,107; Referee: Bouchra Karboubi (Morocco)

July 26 World Cup	United States	1–1	Netherlands	Wellington, New Zealand
21:00 ET	Lavelle (yellow card) 51'; Horan 62'	Report	Roord 17'	Stadium: Sky Stadium; Attendance: 27,312; Referee: Yoshimi Yamashita (Japan)

August 1 World Cup	Portugal	0–0	United States	Auckland, New Zealand
03:00 ET	Costa (yellow card) 56'; Gomes (yellow card) 72'; Amado (yellow card) 86'	Report	Lavelle (yellow card) 39'; Smith (yellow card) 52'; Girma (yellow card) 81'	Stadium: Eden Park; Attendance: 42,958; Referee: Rebecca Welch (England)

August 6 World Cup Round of 16	Sweden	0–0 (a.e.t.) (5–4 p)	United States	Melbourne, Australia
03:00 ET	Asllani (yellow card) 49'	Report	Ertz (yellow card) 119'	Stadium: Melbourne Rectangular Stadium; Attendance: 27,706; Referee: Stéphanie Frappart (France)
	Penalties
	Rolfö (penalty scored); Rubensson (penalty scored); Björn (penalty missed); Blomqvist (penalty missed); Bennison (penalty scored); Eriksson (penalty scored); Hurtig (penalty scored)		(penalty scored) Sullivan; (penalty scored) Horan; (penalty scored) Mewis; (penalty missed) Rapinoe; (penalty missed) Smith; (penalty scored) Naeher; (penalty missed) O'Hara

September 21 Friendly	United States	3–0	South Africa	Cincinnati, OH
19:30 ET	Williams 32', 41'; Rodman 34'; Andi Sullivan (yellow card) 85'	Report	Jermaine Seoposenwe (yellow card) 38'; Kholosa Biyana (yellow card) 45+3'	Stadium: TQL Stadium; Attendance: 22,016; Referee: Katia Garcia (Mexico)

September 24 Friendly	United States	2–0	South Africa	Chicago, IL
17:30 ET	Rodman 18'; Sonnett 49'	Report		Stadium: Soldier Field; Attendance: 25,622; Referee: Carly Shaw-MacLaren (Canada)

October 26 Friendly	United States	0–0	Colombia	Sandy, UT
21:00 ET	Horan (yellow card) 83'	Report	Chacón (yellow card) 42'; Carabalí (yellow card) 47'	Stadium: America First Field; Attendance: 13,058; Referee: Melissa Borjas (Honduras)

October 29 Friendly	United States	3–0	Colombia	San Diego, CA
17:30 ET	Morgan (yellow card) 39'; Fishel 56'; Horan 62'; Shaw 83'	Report	Montoya (yellow card) 41'; Arias (yellow card) 66'; Chacón (yellow card) 72'; Caracas (yellow card) 86'	Stadium: Snapdragon Stadium; Attendance: 16,202; Referee: Odette Hamilton (Jamaica)

December 2 Friendly	United States	3–0	China	Fort Lauderdale, FL
15:00 ET	Smith 8'; Horan 52'; Rodman 77'	Report		Stadium: DRV PNK Stadium; Attendance: 8,768; Referee: Marie-Soleil Beaudoin (Canada)

December 5 Friendly	United States	2–1	China	Frisco, TX
20:00 ET	Coffey 62'; Shaw 79'	Report	Shen 45+1'; Huo (yellow card) 77'; Wurigumula (yellow card) 87'	Stadium: Toyota Stadium; Attendance: 11,024; Referee: Lizzet Garcia (Mexico)

=== 2024 ===
February 20 Gold Cup	United States	5–0	Dominican Republic	Carson, CA
22:15 ET	Moultrie 7', 58'; Williams 30'; Nighswonger 86' (pen.); Morgan 90+2' (pen.)	Report	Reed (yellow card) 85'	Stadium: Dignity Health Sports Park; Attendance: 3,242; Referee: Astrid Gramajo (Guatemala)

February 23 Gold Cup	Argentina	0–4	United States	Carson, CA
22:15 ET	Mayorga (yellow card) 45+5' (yellow-red card) 75'; Cometti (yellow card) 65'	Report	Shaw 10', 17', (yellow card) 58'; Morgan 19'; Horan 77' (pen.)	Stadium: Dignity Health Sports Park; Attendance: 8,315; Referee: Marie-Soleil Beaudoin (Canada)

February 26 Gold Cup	United States	0–2	Mexico	Carson, CA
22:15 ET		Report	Ovalle (yellow card) 29', (goal) 38'; Luna (yellow card) 88'; Pelayo-Bernal 90+2'	Stadium: Dignity Health Sports Park; Attendance: 11,612; Referee: Melissa Borjas (Honduras)

March 3 Gold Cup Quarterfinal	United States	3–0	Colombia	Los Angeles, CA
20:15 ET	Horan 13' (pen.), (yellow card) 67'; Morgan (yellow card) 18'; Rodman (yellow card) 21'; Nighswonger 22'; Shaw 45+2'	Report	Carabalí (yellow card) 11'; Usme (yellow card) 15'; Restrepo (yellow card) 68'; Paví (yellow card) 76'	Stadium: BMO Stadium; Attendance: 16,746; Referee: Marianela Araya (Costa Rica)

March 6 Gold Cup Semifinal	Canada	2–2 (a.e.t.) (1–3 p)	United States	San Diego, CA
22:15 ET	Huitema 82'; Leon (yellow card) 90+2', (goal) 120+7' (pen.)	Report	Shaw 20'; Smith 99'; Naeher (yellow card) 120+5'	Stadium: Snapdragon Stadium; Attendance: 15,245; Referee: Katia García (Mexico)
	Penalties
	Leon (penalty missed); Huitema (penalty missed); Quinn (penalty scored); Fleming (penalty missed)		(penalty scored) Smith; (penalty missed) Albert; (penalty scored) Naeher; (penalty scored) Horan

March 10 Gold Cup Final	United States	1–0	Brazil	San Diego, CA
20:15 ET	Horan 45+1'; Morgan (yellow card) 55'	Report		Stadium: Snapdragon Stadium; Attendance: 31,528; Referee: Melissa Borjas (Honduras)

April 6 SheBelieves Cup Semifinal	United States	2–1	Japan	Atlanta, GA
12:30 ET	Shaw 21'; Horan 77' (pen.)	Report	Seike 1'; Minami (yellow card) 29'; Ueki (yellow card) 45+1'	Stadium: Mercedes-Benz Stadium; Attendance: 50,644; Referee: Myriam Marcotte (Canada)

April 9 SheBelieves Cup Final	United States	2–2 (5–4 p)	Canada	Columbus, OH
19:00 ET	Smith 50', 68'	Report	Fleming (yellow card) 23'; Leon 40', 86' (pen.)	Stadium: Lower.com Field; Attendance: 19,049; Referee: Crystal Sobers (Trinidad and Tobago)
	Penalties
	Rodman (penalty missed); Smith (penalty scored); Naeher (penalty scored); Horan (penalty scored); Sonnett (penalty missed); Dahlkemper (penalty scored); Fox (penalty scored)		(penalty scored) Fleming; (penalty scored) Leon; (penalty missed) Rose; (penalty missed) Lacasse; (penalty scored) Grosso; (penalty scored) Lawrence; (penalty missed) Viens

June 1 Friendly	United States	4–0	South Korea	Commerce City, CO
17:00 ET	Swanson 34', 74'; Davidson 38', 48'	Report	Choo (yellow card) 43'	Stadium: Dick's Sporting Goods Park; Attendance: 19,010; Referee: Carly Shaw-MacLaren (Canada)

June 4 Friendly	United States	3–0	South Korea	Saint Paul, MN
20:00 ET	Dunn 13'; Smith 67'; Yohannes 82'	Report		Stadium: Allianz Field; Attendance: 19,169; Referee: Astrid Gramajo (Guatemala)

July 13 Friendly	United States	1–0	Mexico	Harrison, NJ
15:30 ET	Coffey (yellow card) 31'; Smith 64'	Report	Ovalle (yellow card) 45+1'	Stadium: Red Bull Arena; Attendance: 26,376; Referee: Deily Maria Gomez Espinoza (Costa Rica)

July 16 Friendly	United States	0–0	Costa Rica	Washington, D.C.
19:30 ET		Report	Chinchilla (yellow card) 17'	Stadium: Audi Field; Attendance: 18,972; Referee: Lizzet Amairany Garcia Olvera (Mexico)

July 25 Olympics	United States	3–0	Zambia	Nice, France
15:00 ET	Rodman 17' (yellow card) 44'; Swanson 24', 25'	Report	Zulu (red card) 34'; Tembo (yellow card) 45'	Stadium: Allianz Riviera; Attendance: 5,550; Referee: Ramon Abatti (Brazil)

July 28 Olympics	United States	4–1	Germany	Marseille, France
15:00 ET	Smith 10', 44'; Coffey (yellow card) 22'; Swanson 26'; Williams 89'	Report	Hendrich (yellow card) 18'; Gwinn 22'	Stadium: Stade Vélodrome; Attendance: 9,379; Referee: Yael Falcón (Argentina)

July 31 Olympics	Australia	1–2	United States	Marseille, France
13:00 ET	Gustavsson (coach) (yellow card) 45+2'; Kennedy 90+1'	Report	Coffey (yellow card) 3'; Rodman 43'; Albert (yellow card) 67' (goal) 77'	Stadium: Stade Vélodrome; Attendance: 9,610; Referee: François Letexier (France)

August 3 Olympics Quarterfinal	United States	1–0 (a.e.t.)	Japan	Paris, France
09:00 ET	Sonnett (yellow card) 57'; Rodman 105+2'	Report		Stadium: Parc des Princes; Attendance: 43,004; Referee: Tess Olofsson (Sweden)

August 6 Olympics Semifinal	United States	1–0 (a.e.t.)	Germany	Décines-Charpieu, France
12:00 ET	Smith 95'	Report	Hegering (yellow card) 44'; Brand (yellow card) 108'	Stadium: Parc Olympique Lyonnais; Attendance: 15,107; Referee: Bouchra Karboubi (Morocco)

August 10 Olympics Final	Brazil	0–1	United States	Paris, France
11:00 ET	Tarciane (yellow card) 81'	Report	Swanson 57'	Stadium: Parc des Princes; Attendance: 43,813; Referee: Tess Olofsson (Sweden)

October 24 Friendly	United States	3–1	Iceland	Austin, TX
19:30 ET	Thompson 39'; Shaw 85'; Smith 88'	Report	Magnúsdóttir 56'	Stadium: Q2 Stadium; Attendance: 18,580; Referee: Odette Hamilton (Jamaica)

October 27 Friendly	United States	3–1	Iceland	Nashville, TN
17:30 ET	Williams 72'; Sonnett (yellow card) 73'; Horan (yellow card) 75' (goal) 76'; Sears 90+3'	Report	Vilhjálmsdóttir 31'; Antonsdóttir (yellow card) 51'	Stadium: Geodis Park; Attendance: 17,018; Referee: Melissa Borjas (Honduras)

October 30 Friendly	United States	3–0	Argentina	Louisville, KY
19:00 ET	Girma 37', 49'; Cometti 44' (o.g.)	Report		Stadium: Lynn Family Stadium; Attendance: 13,543; Referee: Karen Hernández Andrade (Mexico)

November 30 Friendly	England	0–0	United States	London, England
12:20 ET	Kelly (yellow card) 90+4'	Report	Coffey (yellow card) 15'	Stadium: Wembley Stadium; Attendance: 78,346; Referee: Lina Lehtovaara (Finland)

December 3 Friendly	Netherlands	1–2	United States	The Hague, Netherlands
15:45 ET	Buurman 15'	Report	Ryan (yellow card) 26'; Buurman 44' (o.g.); Williams 71'; Coffey (yellow card) 80'	Stadium: ADO Den Haag Stadium; Attendance: 12,503; Referee: María Eugenia Gil Soriano (Spain)

=== 2025 ===
February 20 SheBelieves Cup	United States	2–0	Colombia	Houston, TX
20:00 ET	Macario 33'; Sentnor 60'	Report	Arias (yellow card) 58'; Chacón (yellow card) 88'; Reyes (yellow card) 90+1'	Stadium: Shell Energy Stadium; Attendance: 15,043; Referee: Karen Hernández (Mexico)

February 23 SheBelieves Cup	United States	2–1	Australia	Glendale, AZ
17:00 ET	Biyendolo 1'; Cooper 68'	Report	Grant (yellow card) 73'; Heyman 80'	Stadium: State Farm Stadium; Attendance: 23,503; Referee: Amairany Garcia (Mexico)

February 26 SheBelieves Cup	United States	1–2	Japan	San Diego, CA
22:30 ET	Sentnor 14'	Report	Momiki 2'; Koga 50'	Stadium: Snapdragon Stadium; Attendance: 17,188; Referee: Carly Shaw-MacLaren (Canada)

April 5 Friendly	United States	2–0	Brazil	Inglewood, CA
17:00 ET	Rodman 6'; Sonnett (yellow card) 45+2'; Heaps 66'; Cooper (yellow card) 72'	Report	Tarciane (yellow card) 50'; Queiroz (yellow card) 58'; Haas (yellow card) 68'; Adriana (yellow card) 72'; Antônia (yellow card) 83'	Stadium: SoFi Stadium; Attendance: 32,303; Referee: Katia Itzel García (Mexico)

April 8 Friendly	United States	1–2	Brazil	San Jose, CA
22:30 ET	Macario 1'; Cook (yellow card) 59'	Report	Kerolin 24'; Gutierres 90+5'	Stadium: PayPal Park; Attendance: 18,000; Referee: Marianela Araya (Costa Rica)

May 31 Friendly	United States	3–0	China	Saint Paul, MN
17:30 ET	Macario 28'; Coffey 35'; Heaps 54'	Report	Wu (yellow card) 65'; Wang (yellow card) 83'	Stadium: Allianz Field; Attendance: 17,046; Referee: Carly Shaw-MacLaren (Canada)

June 3 Friendly	United States	4–0	Jamaica	St. Louis, MO
20:00 ET	Sentnor 18', 29'; Biyendolo 60', 88'	Report	Blackwood (yellow card) 62'	Stadium: Energizer Park; Attendance: 17,689; Referee: Astrid Gramajo (Guatemala)

June 26 Friendly	United States	4–0	Republic of Ireland	Commerce City, CO
21:00 ET	Patterson 18'; Coffey 45+4'; Lavelle 53'; A. Thompson 63'	Report	Stapleton (yellow card) 62'	Stadium: Dick's Sporting Goods Park; Attendance: 18,504; Referee: Vimarest Diaz (Dominican Republic)

June 29 Friendly	United States	4–0	Republic of Ireland	Cincinnati, OH
15:00 ET	Biyendolo 11'; Rodriguez 42' (yellow card) 69'; Ryan 66'; A. Thompson 86'	Report	Quinn (yellow card) 62'	Stadium: TQL Stadium; Attendance: 24,016; Referee: Janeishka Caban (Puerto Rico)

July 2 Friendly	United States	3–0	Canada	Washington, D.C.
19:30 ET	Coffey 17'; Hutton 36'; Ryan 89'	Report	Lawrence (yellow card) 55'	Stadium: Audi Field; Attendance: 19,215; Referee: Marianela Araya (Costa Rica)

October 23 Friendly	United States	1–2	Portugal	Chester, PA
19:00 ET	Lavelle 1'	Report	Gomes 41' (yellow card) 59'; Alves (yellow card) 43'; Pinto 72'	Stadium: Subaru Park; Attendance: 17,297; Referee: Merlin Soto (Honduras)

October 26 Friendly	United States	3–1	Portugal	East Hartford, CT
16:00 ET	Moultrie 1', 10'; Bugg (yellow card) 19'; Coffey 82'	Report	Silva 5'; Fonseca (yellow card) 13'	Stadium: Pratt & Whitney Stadium at Rentschler Field; Attendance: 26,492; Referee: Karen Hernández (Mexico)

October 29 Friendly	United States	6–0	New Zealand	Kansas City, MO
20:00 ET	Sears 8', 55', 84'; Macario 34', 66'; Lavelle 44'	Report	Wall (yellow card) 49'; Pijnenburg (yellow card) 81'	Stadium: CPKC Stadium; Attendance: 11,044; Referee: Saphire Stockman (Costa Rica)

November 28 Friendly	United States	3–0	Italy	Orlando, FL
19:00 ET	Moultrie 2'; Macario 64', 76'	Report	Bergamaschi (yellow card) 89'	Stadium: Inter&Co Stadium; Attendance: 14,199; Referee: Sandra Benitez (El Salvador)

December 1 Friendly	United States	2–0	Italy	Fort Lauderdale, FL
19:00 ET	Macario 20'; Shaw 41'	Report	Oliviero (yellow card) 90+3'	Stadium: Chase Stadium; Attendance: 9,471; Referee: Priscilla Perez (Mexico)

=== 2026 ===
January 24 Friendly	United States	6–0	Paraguay	Carson, CA
17:30 ET	Turner 45+3'; Sentnor 47', 57'; Martinez 53' (o.g.); Rodman 56'; Sears 72'	Report		Stadium: Dignity Health Sports Park; Attendance: 19,397; Referee: Marianela Araya (Costa Rica)

January 27 Friendly	United States	5–0	Chile	Santa Barbara, CA
22:00 ET	Bethune 18'; Joseph 26'; Sams 33'; Sears 46'; Rodman 68'	Report	Aedo (yellow card) 90'	Stadium: Harder Stadium; Attendance: 14,797; Referee: Timothy Derry (Trinidad and Tobago)

March 1 SheBelieves Cup	United States	2–0	Argentina	Nashville, TN
17:00 ET	Heaps 19'; Shaw 56'	Report	Domínguez (yellow card) 39'; Martín (yellow card) 90+1'	Stadium: Geodis Park; Attendance: 17,125; Referee: Timothy Derry (Trinidad and Tobago)

March 4 SheBelieves Cup	United States	1–0	Canada	Columbus, OH
18:45 ET	Sentnor 55'	Report	Alidou (yellow card) 77'; Carle (yellow card) 88'	Stadium: ScottsMiracle-Gro Field; Attendance: 18,545; Referee: Lizzet Garcia (Mexico)

March 7 SheBelieves Cup	United States	1–0	Colombia	Harrison, NJ
15:30 ET	A. Thompson 82'; Patterson (yellow card) 90'	Report		Stadium: Sports Illustrated Stadium; Attendance: 22,385; Referee: Vimarest Diaz (Dominican Republic)

April 11 Friendly	United States	2–1	Japan	San Jose, CA
17:30 ET	Lavelle 9'; Heaps 48'	Report	Ueki 61'	Stadium: PayPal Park; Attendance: 17,435; Referee: Karen Andrade (Mexico)

April 14 Friendly	United States	0–1	Japan	Seattle, Washington
22:00 ET		Report	Hamano 27'; Moriya (yellow card) 37'	Stadium: Lumen Field; Attendance: 36,128; Referee: Janeishka Caban (Puerto Rico)

April 17 Friendly	United States	3–0	Japan	Commerce City, Colorado
21:00 ET	Girma 47'; Lavelle 56'; Wesley 64'	Report		Stadium: Dick's Sporting Goods Park; Attendance: 17,589; Referee: Myriam Marcotte (Canada)

June 6 Friendly	Brazil	2–1	United States	São Paulo, Brazil
17:30 ET	Maranhão 11' (yellow card) 27'; Zaneratto 14'; Garbelini (yellow card) 84'; Lorena (yellow card) 90+8'	Report	Wilson 2'; Rodman (yellow card) 84'	Stadium: Neo Química Arena; Attendance: 31,336; Referee: María Eugenia Gil Soriano (Spain)

June 9 Friendly	Brazil	0–1	United States	Fortaleza, Brazil
20:30 ET	Garbelini (yellow card) 23'; Elias (coach) (yellow card) 37' (red card) 77'; Zaneratto (yellow card) 43' (yellow-red card) 90+4'; Maranhão (yellow card) 48'; Kerolin (yellow card) 89' (red card) FT; Tarciane (red card) 90+9'; Marta (yellow card) 90+9'; Ludmila (red card) FT	Report	Lavelle (yellow card) 17'; Heaps (yellow card) 43'; Isabela 63' (o.g.); Hutton (yellow card) 82'; Dickey (yellow card) 90+5'; Sears (yellow card) 90+8'	Stadium: Arena Castelão; Attendance: 55,744; Referee: Paola Cebollada Lopez (Spain)

October 10 Friendly	United States	0–2	Spain	Washington, D.C.
14:30 ET	Rodman (yellow card) 31'; Yohannes (yellow card) 71'	Report	Guijarro 3'; Navarro 14'; Paralluelo (yellow card) 24'; Corrales (yellow card) 40'; del Castillo (red card) 90+1'	Stadium: Audi Field; Attendance: 19,220; Referee: Diana Pérez (Mexico)

October 13 Friendly	United States	2–2	Spain	Chester, Pennsylvania
19:00 ET	Sanchez 49'; Swanson 86'	Report	Putellas 27'; Paralluelo 32'; Ramos (yellow card) 80'; Vignola (yellow card) 90+3'	Stadium: Subaru Park; Attendance: 18,648; Referee: Myriam Marcotte (Canada)

November 27 2026 CONCACAF W Championship QF	United States	v	El Salvador	Mansfield, Texas
				Stadium: Texas Health Mansfield Stadium

=== 2027 ===
January 12 Friendly	United States	v	Panama	Carson, California
				Stadium: Dignity Health Sports Park
