= Football at the 2024 Summer Olympics – Women's tournament – Knockout stage =

The knockout stage of the women's football tournament at the 2024 Summer Olympics was played from 3 to 10 August 2024. The top two teams and the two best-ranked third-placed teams from each group in the group stage qualified for the knockout stage.

== Format ==
In the knockout stage, if a match was level at the end of regulation time, extra time was played (two periods of 15 minutes each), and followed, if necessary, by a penalty shoot-out to determine the winner.

== Qualified teams ==
The top two placed teams and the two best-ranked third-placed teams from each of the four groups qualified for the knockout stage.

Group	Winners	Runners-up	Third-placed teams (Best two qualify)
A	France	Canada	Colombia
B	United States	Germany	—N/a
C	Spain	Japan	Brazil

== Combinations of matches in the quarter-finals ==
The specific match-ups involving the third-placed teams depended on which two third-placed teams qualified for the quarter-finals:

Combination according to the two qualified teams

Third-placed teams qualify from groups			1A vs	1C vs
A	B		3B	3A
A		C	3C	3A
	B	C	3C	3B

== Bracket ==
Quarter-finals
3 August – Nantes
France	0
Brazil	1
3 August – Décines-Charpieu
Spain (p)	2 (4)
Colombia	2 (2)
3 August – Paris
United States (a.e.t.)	1
Japan	0
3 August – Marseille
Canada	0 (2)
Germany (p)	0 (4)

Semi-finals
6 August – Marseille
Brazil	4
Spain	2
6 August – Décines-Charpieu
United States (a.e.t.)	1
Germany	0

Gold medal match
10 August – Paris
Brazil	0
United States	1
Bronze medal match
9 August – Décines-Charpieu
Spain	0
Germany	1

== Quarter-finals ==
=== United States vs Japan ===
This was a repeat of the 2012 Olympic final, when the U.S. prevailed 2–1. They also met in the 2011 and 2015 FIFA Women's World Cup finals, Japan won the former 3–1 on penalties following a 2–2 draw and the U.S. won the latter 5–2.

3 August 2024
15:00

United States	1–0 (a.e.t.)	Japan
Rodman 105+2'	Report

Parc des Princes, Paris
Attendance: 43,004
Referee: Tess Olofsson (Sweden)

United States	Japan

GK	1	Alyssa Naeher
RB	2	Emily Fox		(substituted off) 120+1'
CB	4	Naomi Girma
CB	14	Emily Sonnett	(yellow card) 57'
LB	7	Crystal Dunn
DM	3	Korbin Albert
CM	16	Rose Lavelle		(substituted off) 106'
CM	10	Lindsey Horan (c)
RF	5	Trinity Rodman
CF	9	Mallory Swanson		(substituted off) 91'
LF	11	Sophia Smith
Substitutes:
GK	18	Casey Murphy
DF	6	Casey Krueger		(substituted on) 120+1'
DF	13	Jenna Nighswonger		(substituted on) 106'
DF	21	Emily Sams
FW	8	Lynn Williams		(substituted on) 91'
FW	15	Jaedyn Shaw
Manager:
(United Kingdom) Emma Hayes

GK	1	Ayaka Yamashita
CB	6	Tōko Koga	(substituted off) 91'
CB	4	Saki Kumagai (c)
CB	3	Moeka Minami
RM	20	Miyabi Moriya
CM	14	Yui Hasegawa	(substituted off) 106'
CM	10	Fuka Nagano
LM	13	Hikaru Kitagawa	(substituted off) 106'
RF	8	Kiko Seike	(substituted off) 46'
CF	11	Mina Tanaka	(substituted off) 70'
LF	15	Aoba Fujino	(substituted off) 81'
Substitutes:
GK	22	Shu Ohba
DF	5	Hana Takahashi	(substituted on) 91'
MF	7	Hinata Miyazawa	(substituted on) 81'
MF	16	Honoka Hayashi	(substituted on) 106'
FW	9	Riko Ueki	(substituted on) 70'
FW	17	Maika Hamano	(substituted on) 46'
FW	19	Remina Chiba	(substituted on) 106'
Manager:
Futoshi Ikeda

Assistant referees:
Almira Spahić (Sweden)
Francesca Di Monte (Italy)
Fourth official:
Espen Eskås (Norway)
Reserve assistant referee:
Jan Erik Engan (Norway)
Video assistant referee:
Ivan Bebek (Croatia)
Assistant video assistant referees:
David Coote (Great Britain)
Ovidiu Hațegan (Romania)

=== Spain vs Colombia ===
3 August 2024
17:00

Spain	2–2 (a.e.t.)	Colombia
Hermoso 79'; Paredes 90+7'	Report	Ramírez 12'; Santos 52'
Penalties
Caldentey (penalty scored); Navarro (penalty scored); Paralluelo (penalty scored); Bonmatí (penalty scored)	4–2	(penalty missed) Usme; (penalty scored) Vanegas; (penalty missed) Salazar; (penalty scored) Carabalí

Stade de Lyon, Décines-Charpieu
Attendance: 10,355
Referee: Katia García (Mexico)

Spain	Colombia

GK	13	Cata Coll
RB	2	Ona Batlle
CB	4	Irene Paredes (c)
CB	14	Laia Aleixandri	(yellow card) 8'	(substituted off) 79'
LB	18	Olga Carmona		(substituted off) 65'
DM	12	Patricia Guijarro		(substituted off) 52'
CM	6	Aitana Bonmatí
CM	11	Alexia Putellas		(substituted off) 65'
RF	7	Athenea del Castillo		(substituted off) 79'
CF	9	Salma Paralluelo
LF	8	Mariona Caldentey
Substitutes:
GK	1	Misa Rodríguez
DF	16	Laia Codina		(substituted on) 79'
MF	3	Teresa Abelleira		(substituted on) 52'
FW	10	Jenni Hermoso		(substituted on) 65'
FW	15	Eva Navarro		(substituted on) 79'
FW	17	Lucía García
FW	21	Alba Redondo		(substituted on) 65'
Manager:
Montserrat Tomé

GK	12	Katherine Tapia
RB	17	Carolina Arias
CB	3	Daniela Arias	(yellow card) 30'
CB	16	Jorelyn Carabalí
LB	2	Manuela Vanegas
CM	8	Marcela Restrepo		(substituted off) 98'
CM	11	Catalina Usme (c)
RW	7	Manuela Paví		(substituted off) 45+2'
AM	10	Leicy Santos		(substituted off) 86'
LW	18	Linda Caicedo		(substituted off) 66'
CF	9	Mayra Ramírez		(substituted off) 86'
Substitutes:
GK	22	Sandra Sepúlveda
DF	4	Daniela Caracas		(substituted on) 86'
DF	5	Yirleidis Minota		(substituted on) 98'
DF	14	Ángela Barón
MF	6	Daniela Montoya		(substituted on) 66'
MF	13	Ilana Izquierdo		(substituted on) 45+2'
MF	15	Liana Salazar		(substituted on) 86'
Manager:
Ángelo Marsiglia

Assistant referees:
Sandra Ramírez (Mexico)
Karen Díaz (Mexico)
Fourth official:
Kim Yu-jeong (South Korea)
Reserve assistant referee:
Park Mi-suk (South Korea)
Video assistant referee:
Tatiana Guzmán (Nicaragua)
Assistant video assistant referees:
Guillermo Pacheco (Mexico)
Sivakorn Pu-udom (Thailand)

=== Canada vs Germany ===
3 August 2024
19:00

Canada	0–0 (a.e.t.)	Germany
	Report
Penalties
Quinn (penalty scored); Lawrence (penalty missed); Leon (penalty missed); Beckie (penalty scored)	2–4	(penalty scored) Gwinn; (penalty scored) Minge; (penalty missed) Lohmann; (penalty scored) Rauch; (penalty scored) Berger

Stade de Marseille, Marseille
Attendance: 12,517
Referee: Edina Alves Batista (Brazil)

Canada	Germany

GK	1	Kailen Sheridan
RB	12	Jade Rose
CB	14	Vanessa Gilles
CB	3	Kadeisha Buchanan
LB	2	Gabrielle Carle	(substituted off) 57'
CM	13	Simi Awujo	(substituted off) 109'
CM	5	Quinn
RW	10	Ashley Lawrence
AM	17	Jessie Fleming (c)	(substituted off) 46'
LW	9	Jordyn Huitema	(substituted off) 57'
CF	15	Nichelle Prince	(substituted off) 57'
Substitutes:
GK	18	Sabrina D'Angelo
DF	20	Shelina Zadorsky
MF	7	Julia Grosso	(substituted on) 109'
FW	4	Evelyne Viens	(substituted on) 57'
FW	6	Cloé Lacasse	(substituted on) 57'
FW	11	Adriana Leon	(substituted on) 57'
FW	16	Janine Beckie	(substituted on) 46'
Interim manager:
(United Kingdom) Andy Spence

GK	12	Ann-Katrin Berger
RB	15	Giulia Gwinn	(yellow card) 107'
CB	3	Kathrin Hendrich
CB	5	Marina Hegering
LB	19	Felicitas Rauch	(yellow card) 102'
DM	9	Sjoeke Nüsken		(substituted off) 65'
RM	16	Jule Brand	(yellow card) 79'
CM	6	Janina Minge
LM	17	Klara Bühl		(substituted off) 65'
CF	11	Alexandra Popp (c)
CF	7	Lea Schüller		(substituted off) 114'
Substitutions:
GK	1	Merle Frohms
DF	4	Bibiane Schulze
DF	13	Sara Doorsoun
MF	8	Sydney Lohmann		(substituted on) 65'
MF	14	Elisa Senß		(substituted on) 104'
FW	10	Laura Freigang		(substituted on) 114'
FW	18	Vivien Endemann		(substituted on) 65'	(substituted off) 104'
Interim manager:
Horst Hrubesch

Assistant referees:
Neuza Back (Brazil)
Fabrini Bevilaqua (Brazil)
Fourth official:
Emikar Calderas (Venezuela)
Reserve assistant referee:
Migdalia Rodríguez (Venezuela)
Video assistant referee:
Daiane Muniz (Brazil)
Assistant video assistant referees:
Leodán González (Uruguay)
Carlos del Cerro Grande (Spain)

=== France vs Brazil ===
3 August 2024
21:00

France	0–1	Brazil
	Report	Gabi Portilho 82'

Stade de la Beaujoire, Nantes
Attendance: 32,280
Referee: Tori Penso (United States)

France	Brazil

GK	1	Constance Picaud
RB	5	Élisa De Almeida		(substituted off) 90+5'
CB	18	Griedge Mbock Bathy
CB	3	Wendie Renard (c)
LB	13	Selma Bacha
DM	14	Sandie Toletti		(substituted off) 85'
CM	8	Grace Geyoro
CM	7	Sakina Karchaoui
RF	10	Delphine Cascarino	(yellow card) 90+10'
CF	12	Marie-Antoinette Katoto	(yellow card) 28'
LF	17	Sandy Baltimore		(substituted off) 69'
Substitutes:
GK	16	Pauline Peyraud-Magnin
DF	2	Maëlle Lakrar
DF	4	Estelle Cascarino
MF	6	Amandine Henry
MF	15	Kenza Dali		(substituted on) 90+5'
FW	9	Eugénie Le Sommer		(substituted on) 85'
FW	11	Kadidiatou Diani	(yellow card) 90+4'	(substituted on) 69'
Manager:
Hervé Renard

GK	1	Lorena
RB	15	Thaís		(substituted off) 88'
CB	3	Tarciane
CB	4	Rafaelle Souza (c)		(substituted off) 54'
LB	13	Yasmim
RM	11	Jheniffer	(yellow card) 1'	(substituted off) 87'
CM	5	Duda Sampaio		(substituted off) 63'
CM	17	Ana Vitória
LM	9	Adriana
CF	16	Gabi Nunes		(substituted off) 62'
CF	18	Gabi Portilho	(yellow card) 90+4'
Substitutes:
GK	12	Tainá
DF	6	Tamires	(yellow card) 79'	(substituted on) 54'
DF	21	Lauren		(substituted on) 88'
MF	20	Angelina	(yellow card) 90+9'	(substituted on) 62'
FW	7	Kerolin	(yellow card) 79'	(substituted on) 62'
FW	14	Ludmila		(substituted on) 87'
Manager:
Arthur Elias

Assistant referees:
Brooke Mayo (United States)
Kathryn Nesbitt (United States)
Fourth official:
Yoshimi Yamashita (Japan)
Reserve assistant referee:
Makoto Bozono (Japan)
Video assistant referee:
Rob Dieperink (Netherlands)
Assistant video assistant referees:
Rodrigo Carvajal (Chile)
Khamis Al-Marri (Qatar)

== Semi-finals ==
=== United States vs Germany ===
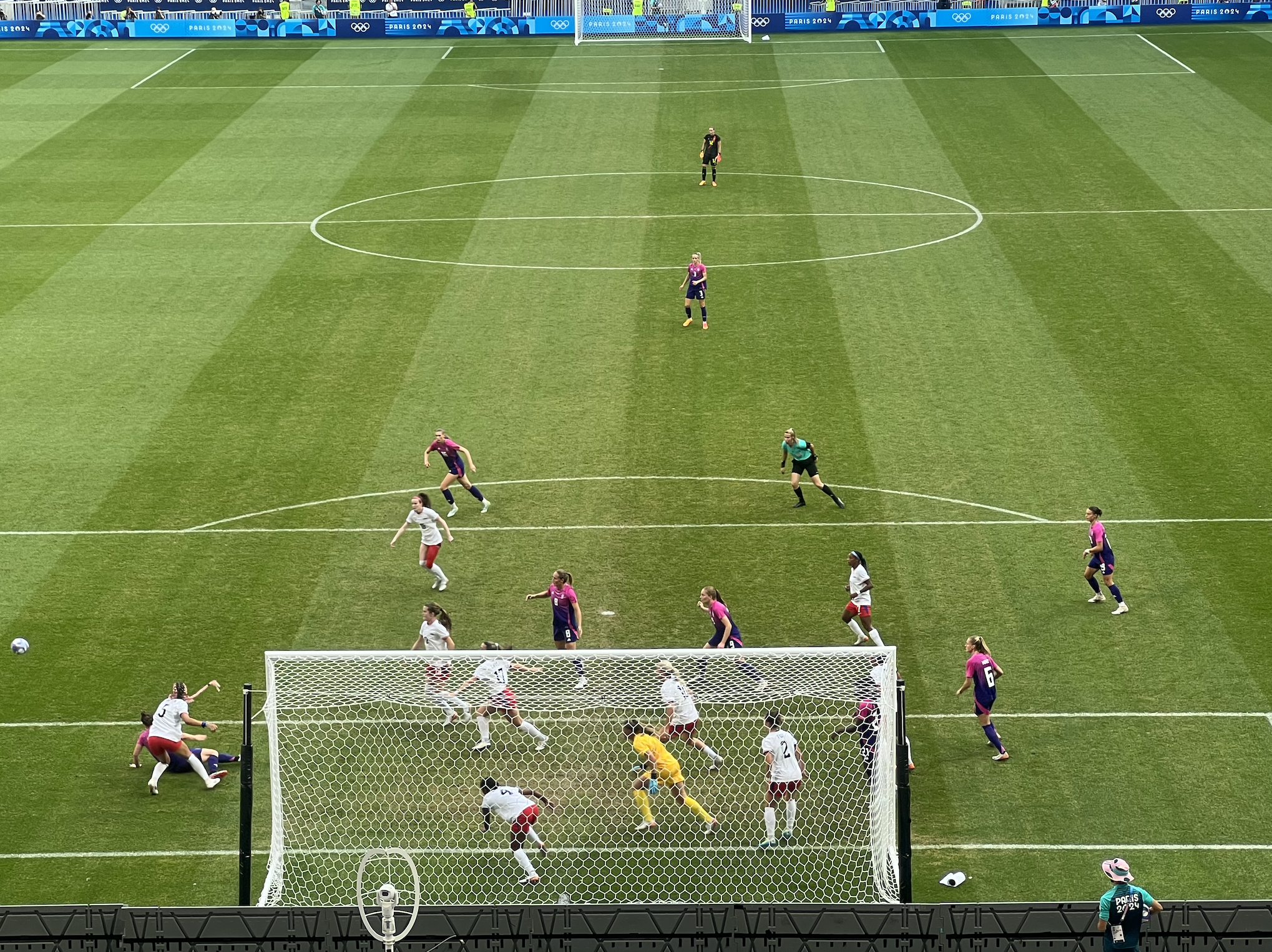

6 August 2024
18:00

United States	1–0 (a.e.t.)	Germany
Smith 95'	Report

Stade de Lyon, Décines-Charpieu
Attendance: 11,716
Referee: Bouchra Karboubi (Morocco)

United States	Germany

GK	1	Alyssa Naeher
RB	2	Emily Fox
CB	4	Naomi Girma
CB	12	Tierna Davidson	(substituted off) 46'
LB	7	Crystal Dunn	(substituted off) 91'
DM	17	Sam Coffey
CM	10	Lindsey Horan (c)	(substituted off) 91'
CM	16	Rose Lavelle	(substituted off) 60'
RF	5	Trinity Rodman
CF	9	Mallory Swanson	(substituted off) 110'
LF	11	Sophia Smith
Substitutes:
GK	18	Casey Murphy
DF	6	Casey Krueger	(substituted on) 110'
DF	13	Jenna Nighswonger	(substituted on) 91'
MF	3	Korbin Albert	(substituted on) 91'
MF	14	Emily Sonnett	(substituted on) 46'
FW	8	Lynn Williams	(substituted on) 60'
FW	15	Jaedyn Shaw
Manager:
(United Kingdom) Emma Hayes

GK	12	Ann-Katrin Berger
RB	15	Giulia Gwinn (c)
CB	3	Kathrin Hendrich
CB	5	Marina Hegering	(yellow card) 44'	(substituted off) 78'
LB	19	Felicitas Rauch		(substituted off) 106'
DM	9	Sjoeke Nüsken
CM	8	Sydney Lohmann		(substituted off) 91'
CM	6	Janina Minge
AM	16	Jule Brand	(yellow card) 108'
CF	21	Nicole Anyomi		(substituted off) 69'
CF	17	Klara Bühl
Substitutes:
GK	1	Merle Frohms
DF	2	Sarai Linder
DF	4	Bibiane Schulze		(substituted on) 78'
DF	13	Sara Doorsoun		(substituted on) 106'
MF	14	Elisa Senß		(substituted on) 91'
FW	10	Laura Freigang		(substituted on) 69'
FW	18	Vivien Endemann
Interim manager:
Horst Hrubesch

Assistant referees:
Fatiha Jermoumi (Morocco)
Diana Chikotesha (Zambia)
Fourth official:
Kim Yu-jeong (South Korea)
Reserve assistant referee:
Park Mi-suk (South Korea)
Video assistant referee:
Ivan Bebek (Croatia)
Assistant video assistant referees:
Tatiana Guzmán (Nicaragua)
Khamis Al-Marri (Qatar)

=== Brazil vs Spain ===
6 August 2024
21:00

Brazil	4–2	Spain
Paredes 6' (o.g.); Gabi Portilho 45+4'; Adriana 71'; Kerolin 90+1'	Report	Duda Sampaio 85' (o.g.); Paralluelo 90+12'

Stade de Marseille, Marseille
Attendance: 14,201
Referee: Rebecca Welch (Great Britain)

Brazil	Spain

GK	1	Lorena
CB	15	Thaís
CB	21	Lauren		(substituted off) 76'
CB	3	Tarciane
RM	14	Ludmila		(substituted off) 56'
CM	20	Angelina (c)		(substituted off) 56'
CM	8	Vitória Yaya
LM	13	Yasmim
RF	19	Priscila		(substituted off) 76'
CF	18	Gabi Portilho	(yellow card) 90'
LF	11	Jheniffer		(substituted off) 69'
Substitutes:
GK	22	Luciana
MF	17	Ana Vitória		(substituted on) 69'
MF	5	Duda Sampaio		(substituted on) 56'
FW	7	Kerolin		(substituted on) 76'
FW	9	Adriana	(yellow card) 90+8'	(substituted on) 56'
FW	16	Gabi Nunes		(substituted on) 76'
Manager:
Arthur Elias

GK	13	Cata Coll	(yellow card) 90'
RB	2	Ona Batlle
CB	4	Irene Paredes (c)		(substituted off) 51'
CB	16	Laia Codina		(substituted off) 77'
LB	18	Olga Carmona		(substituted off) 46'
DM	3	Teresa Abelleira	(yellow card) 45+3'	(substituted off) 64'
CM	6	Aitana Bonmatí
CM	10	Jenni Hermoso
RF	15	Eva Navarro		(substituted off) 46'
CF	9	Salma Paralluelo
LF	8	Mariona Caldentey
Substitutes:
GK	1	Misa Rodríguez
DF	5	Oihane Hernández		(substituted on) 46'
DF	14	Laia Aleixandri		(substituted on) 51'
MF	11	Alexia Putellas		(substituted on) 77'
MF	12	Patricia Guijarro		(substituted on) 64'
MF	7	Athenea del Castillo		(substituted on) 46'
FW	17	Lucía García
Manager:
Montserrat Tomé

Assistant referees:
Emily Carney (Great Britain)
Franca Overtoom (Netherlands)
Fourth official:
Yoshimi Yamashita (Japan)
Reserve assistant referee:
Makoto Bozono (Japan)
Video assistant referee:
Jérôme Brisard (France)
Assistant video assistant referees:
Rodrigo Carvajal (Chile)
Rob Dieperink (Netherlands)

== Bronze medal match ==
9 August 2024
15:00

Spain	0–1	Germany
	Report	Gwinn 65' (pen.)

Stade de Lyon, Décines-Charpieu
Attendance: 10,995
Referee: Katia García (Mexico)

Spain	Germany

GK	13	Cata Coll	(yellow card) 63'
RB	2	Ona Batlle
CB	16	Laia Codina		(substituted off) 85'
CB	14	Laia Aleixandri
LB	5	Oihane Hernández		(substituted off) 72'
DM	3	Teresa Abelleira		(substituted off) 85'
CM	6	Aitana Bonmatí
CM	11	Alexia Putellas (c)
RF	7	Athenea del Castillo		(substituted off) 72'
CF	10	Jenni Hermoso
LF	9	Salma Paralluelo
Substitutes:
GK	22	Elene Lete
DF	18	Olga Carmona		(substituted on) 72'
DF	20	María Méndez
MF	12	Patricia Guijarro		(substituted on) 85'
MF	19	Vicky López
FW	8	Mariona Caldentey		(substituted on) 72'
FW	17	Lucía García		(substituted on) 85'
Manager:
Montserrat Tomé

GK	12	Ann-Katrin Berger
RB	2	Sarai Linder	(substituted off) 90+6'
CB	3	Kathrin Hendrich
CB	5	Marina Hegering
LB	19	Felicitas Rauch
CM	9	Sjoeke Nüsken	(substituted off) 46'
CM	6	Janina Minge
RW	15	Giulia Gwinn
AM	16	Jule Brand
LW	17	Klara Bühl
CF	11	Alexandra Popp (c)
Substitutes:
GK	1	Merle Frohms
DF	4	Bibiane Schulze
DF	13	Sara Doorsoun	(substituted on) 90+6'
MF	14	Elisa Senß
FW	7	Lea Schüller	(substituted on) 46'
FW	10	Laura Freigang
FW	18	Vivien Endemann
Interim manager:
Horst Hrubesch

Assistant referees:
Sandra Ramírez (Mexico)
Karen Díaz (Mexico)
Fourth official:
Tori Penso (United States)
Reserve assistant referee:
Brooke Mayo (United States)
Video assistant referee:
Khamis Al-Marri (Qatar)
Assistant video assistant referees:
Daiane Muniz (Brazil)
Guillermo Pacheco (Mexico)

== Gold medal match ==
10 August 2024
17:00

Brazil	0–1	United States
	Report	Swanson 57'

Parc des Princes, Paris
Attendance: 43,813
Referee: Tess Olofsson (Sweden)

Brazil	United States

GK	1	Lorena
CB	15	Thaís
CB	21	Lauren		(substituted off) 84'
CB	3	Tarciane	(yellow card) 81'
RM	9	Adriana (c)
CM	8	Vitória Yaya		(substituted off) 50'
CM	5	Duda Sampaio		(substituted off) 61'
LM	13	Yasmim
RF	18	Gabi Portilho
CF	11	Jheniffer		(substituted off) 61'
LF	14	Ludmila		(substituted off) 61'
Substitutes:
GK	12	Tainá
DF	4	Rafaelle Souza		(substituted on) 84'
MF	17	Ana Vitória		(substituted on) 50'
MF	20	Angelina		(substituted on) 61'
FW	10	Marta		(substituted on) 61'
FW	16	Gabi Nunes
FW	19	Priscila		(substituted on) 61'
Manager:
Arthur Elias

GK	1	Alyssa Naeher
RB	2	Emily Fox
CB	4	Naomi Girma
CB	12	Tierna Davidson	(substituted off) 74'
LB	7	Crystal Dunn
DM	3	Korbin Albert
CM	17	Sam Coffey
CM	10	Lindsey Horan (c)
RF	5	Trinity Rodman
CF	9	Mallory Swanson	(substituted off) 90+5'
LF	11	Sophia Smith	(substituted off) 84'
Substitutes:
GK	18	Casey Murphy
DF	6	Casey Krueger	(substituted on) 90+5'
DF	13	Jenna Nighswonger
MF	14	Emily Sonnett	(substituted on) 74'
MF	16	Rose Lavelle
FW	8	Lynn Williams	(substituted on) 84'
FW	15	Jaedyn Shaw
Manager:
(United Kingdom) Emma Hayes

Assistant referees:
Almira Spahić (Sweden)
Francesca Di Monte (Italy)
Fourth official:
Rebecca Welch (Great Britain)
Reserve assistant referee:
Franca Overtoom (Netherlands)
Video assistant referee:
Ivan Bebek (Croatia)
Assistant video assistant referees:
Carlos del Cerro Grande (Spain)
Jérôme Brisard (France)
