= Football at the 2024 Summer Olympics – Women's tournament – Group C =

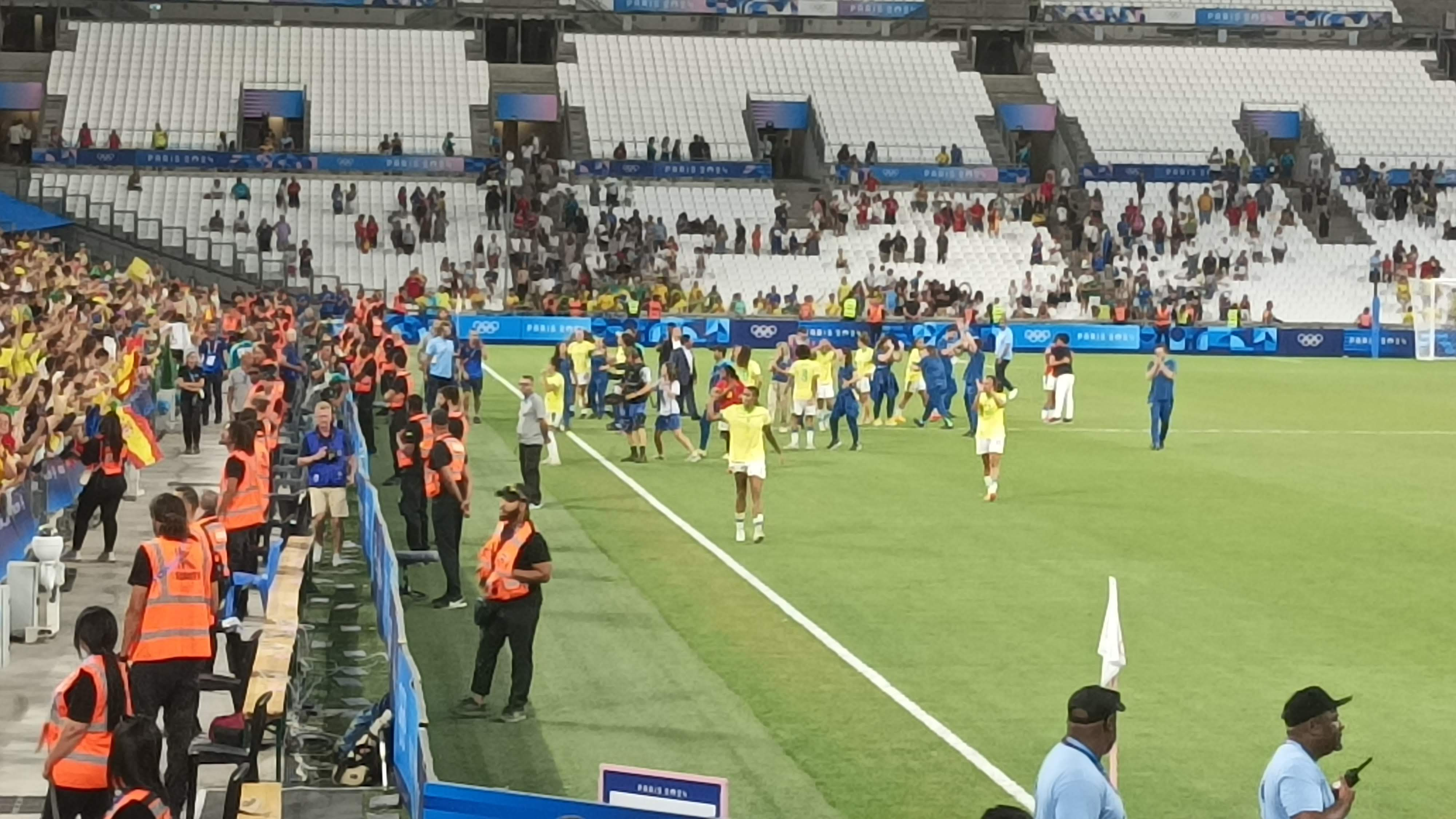
Football at the 2024 Summer Olympics – Women's tournament in Group C - Brazil v Spain

Group C of the women's football tournament at the 2024 Summer Olympics was played from 25 to 31 July 2024. The group, one of three 4-team groups competing in the group stage of the Olympic tournament, consisted of Brazil, Japan, Spain and Nigeria. The top two teams, Spain and Japan, advanced to the knockout stage, along with third-placed Brazil as one of the two best third-placed teams among all three groups.

== Teams ==
Draw position	Team	Pot	Confederation	Method of qualification	Date of qualification	Olympic appearance	Last appearance	Previous best performance
C1	Spain	1	UEFA	2024 UEFA Women's Nations League Finals top two	23 February 2024	1st	Debut	
C2	Japan	2	AFC	2024 AFC Women's Olympic Qualifying Tournament top two	28 February 2024	6th	2020	Silver medalists (2012)
C3	Nigeria	4	CAF	2024 CAF Women's Olympic qualifying tournament top two	9 April 2024	4th	2008	Sixth place (2004)
C4	Brazil	3	CONMEBOL	2022 Copa América Femenina top two	26 July 2022	8th	2020	Silver medalists (2004, 2008)

== Standings ==
Pos	Team	Pld	W	D	L	GF	GA	GD	Pts	Qualification
1	Spain	3	3	0	0	5	1	+4	9	Advance to knockout stage
2	Japan	3	2	0	1	6	4	+2	6	Advance to knockout stage
3	Brazil	3	1	0	2	2	4	−2	3	Advance to knockout stage
4	Nigeria	3	0	0	3	1	5	−4	0	

Source: FIFA
Rules for classification: Group stage tiebreakers

In the quarter-finals:

- The winners of Group C, Spain, advanced to play the third-placed team of Group A, Colombia.
- The runners-up of Group C, Japan, advanced to play the winners of Group B, the United States.
- The third-placed team of Group C, Brazil, advanced to play the winners of Group A, France.

== Matches ==
=== Spain vs Japan ===
25 July 2024
17:00

Spain	2–1	Japan
Bonmatí 22'; Caldentey 74'	Report	Fujino 13'

Stade de la Beaujoire, Nantes
Attendance: 10,377
Referee: Bouchra Karboubi (Morocco)

Spain	Japan

GK	13	Cata Coll
RB	2	Ona Batlle
CB	4	Irene Paredes (c)	(yellow card) 42'
CB	14	Laia Aleixandri
LB	18	Olga Carmona		(substituted off) 60'
DM	12	Patricia Guijarro	(yellow card) 11'	(substituted off) 82'
CM	6	Aitana Bonmatí
CM	11	Alexia Putellas		(substituted off) 68'
RF	7	Athenea del Castillo		(substituted off) 82'
CF	9	Salma Paralluelo
LF	8	Mariona Caldentey
Substitutes:
GK	1	Misa Rodríguez
DF	5	Oihane Hernández		(substituted on) 60'
DF	16	Laia Codina
MF	3	Teresa Abelleira		(substituted on) 82'
FW	10	Jenni Hermoso		(substituted on) 68'
FW	15	Eva Navarro
FW	17	Lucía García		(substituted on) 82'
Manager:
Montserrat Tomé

GK	1	Ayaka Yamashita
CB	3	Moeka Minami
CB	4	Saki Kumagai (c)
CB	6	Tōko Koga	(substituted off) 90'
RM	2	Risa Shimizu	(substituted off) 69'
CM	7	Hinata Miyazawa
CM	15	Aoba Fujino
LM	8	Kiko Seike	(substituted off) 46'
RF	14	Yui Hasegawa
CF	11	Mina Tanaka	(substituted off) 80'
LF	10	Fuka Nagano
Substitutes:
GK	18	Chika Hirao
DF	5	Hana Takahashi	(substituted on) 69'
DF	20	Miyabi Moriya	(substituted on) 90'
MF	12	Momoko Tanikawa
FW	9	Riko Ueki
FW	17	Maika Hamano	(substituted on) 46'
FW	19	Remina Chiba	(substituted on) 80'
Manager:
Futoshi Ikeda

Assistant referees:
Fatiha Jermoumi (Morocco)
Diana Chikotesha (Zambia)
Fourth official:
Odette Hamilton (Jamaica)
Video assistant referee:
Jérôme Brisard (France)
Assistant video assistant referee:
Mahmoud Ashour (Egypt)

=== Nigeria vs Brazil ===
25 July 2024
19:00

Nigeria	0–1	Brazil
	Report	Gabi Nunes 37'

Stade de Bordeaux, Bordeaux
Attendance: 6,244
Referee: Kim Yu-jeong (South Korea)

Nigeria	Brazil

GK	16	Chiamaka Nnadozie
RB	2	Michelle Alozie
CB	14	Oluwatosin Demehin
CB	3	Osinachi Ohale
LB	5	Chidinma Okeke	(substituted off) 74'
CM	13	Deborah Abiodun
CM	10	Christy Ucheibe
RW	7	Toni Payne	(substituted off) 67'
AM	11	Jennifer Echegini	(substituted off) 67'
LW	15	Rasheedat Ajibade (c)
CF	17	Chinwendu Ihezuo	(substituted off) 46'
Substitutes:
GK	1	Tochukwu Oluehi
DF	4	Nicole Payne	(substituted on) 74'
FW	6	Esther Okoronkwo	(substituted on) 46'
FW	8	Asisat Oshoala
FW	9	Chinonyerem Macleans
FW	12	Uchenna Kanu	(substituted on) 67'
FW	18	Ifeoma Onumonu	(substituted on) 67'
Manager:
(United States) Randy Waldrum

GK	1	Lorena
RB	2	Antônia
CB	4	Rafaelle Souza
CB	3	Tarciane
LB	6	Tamires		(substituted off) 36'
RM	14	Ludmila		(substituted off) 64'
CM	8	Vitória Yaya	(yellow card) 28'	(substituted off) 64'
CM	5	Duda Sampaio
LM	10	Marta (c)
CF	16	Gabi Nunes		(substituted off) 82'
CF	18	Gabi Portilho
Substitutes:
GK	12	Tainá
DF	13	Yasmim		(substituted on) 36'
DF	15	Thaís
MF	17	Ana Vitória		(substituted on) 64'
FW	7	Kerolin		(substituted on) 82'
FW	9	Adriana
FW	11	Jheniffer		(substituted on) 64'
Manager:
Arthur Elias

Assistant referees:
Park Mi-suk (South Korea)
Joanna Charaktis (Australia)
Fourth official:
Jelena Cvetković (Serbia)
Video assistant referee:
Kate Jacewicz (Australia)
Assistant video assistant referee:
Ivan Bebek (Croatia)

=== Brazil vs Japan ===
28 July 2024
17:00

Brazil	1–2	Japan
Jheniffer 56'	Report	Kumagai 90+2' (pen.); Tanikawa 90+6'

Parc des Princes, Paris
Attendance: 40,918
Referee: Rebecca Welch (Great Britain)

Brazil	Japan

GK	1	Lorena
RB	2	Antônia
CB	15	Thaís
CB	21	Lauren	(yellow card) 2'	(substituted off) 46'
CB	4	Rafaelle Souza
LB	13	Yasmim
CM	20	Angelina		(substituted off) 70'
CM	17	Ana Vitória
RF	19	Priscila		(substituted off) 46'
CF	16	Gabi Nunes		(substituted off) 46'
LF	10	Marta (c)	(yellow card) 44'	(substituted off) 85'
Substitutes:
GK	12	Tainá
DF	3	Tarciane		(substituted on) 46'
MF	5	Duda Sampaio		(substituted on) 70'
FW	7	Kerolin		(substituted on) 85'
FW	11	Jheniffer		(substituted on) 46'
FW	14	Ludmila		(substituted on) 46'
FW	18	Gabi Portilho
Manager:
Arthur Elias

GK	1	Ayaka Yamashita
RB	20	Miyabi Moriya		(substituted off) 80'
CB	5	Hana Takahashi
CB	4	Saki Kumagai (c)
CB	3	Moeka Minami	(yellow card) 71'
LB	6	Tōko Koga		(substituted off) 70'
CM	14	Yui Hasegawa
CM	10	Fuka Nagano
CM	7	Hinata Miyazawa		(substituted off) 80'
CF	17	Maika Hamano		(substituted off) 57'
CF	11	Mina Tanaka
Substitutes:
GK	18	Chika Hirao
DF	21	Rion Ishikawa
MF	8	Kiko Seike		(substituted on) 70'
MF	12	Momoko Tanikawa		(substituted on) 80'
MF	16	Honoka Hayashi
FW	9	Riko Ueki		(substituted on) 57'
FW	19	Remina Chiba		(substituted on) 80'
Manager:
Futoshi Ikeda

Assistant referees:
Emily Carney (Great Britain)
Franca Overtoom (Netherlands)
Fourth official:
Tess Olofsson (Sweden)
Video assistant referee:
David Coote (Great Britain)
Assistant video assistant referee:
Jérôme Brisard (France)

=== Spain vs Nigeria ===
28 July 2024
19:00

Spain	1–0	Nigeria
Putellas 85'	Report

Stade de la Beaujoire, Nantes
Attendance: 11,079
Referee: Tori Penso (United States)

Spain	Nigeria

GK	13	Cata Coll
RB	5	Oihane Hernández	(substituted off) 46'
CB	4	Irene Paredes (c)
CB	14	Laia Aleixandri
LB	2	Ona Batlle
DM	3	Teresa Abelleira	(substituted off) 59'
CM	6	Aitana Bonmatí
CM	11	Alexia Putellas
RF	17	Lucía García	(substituted off) 46'
CF	9	Salma Paralluelo
LF	8	Mariona Caldentey
Substitutes:
GK	1	Misa Rodríguez
DF	16	Laia Codina
DF	18	Olga Carmona	(substituted on) 46'
MF	12	Patri Guijarro	(substituted on) 59'
MF	7	Athenea del Castillo	(substituted on) 46'
FW	10	Jenni Hermoso
FW	15	Eva Navarro
Manager:
Montserrat Tomé

GK	16	Chiamaka Nnadozie
RB	2	Michelle Alozie		(substituted off) 72'
CB	3	Osinachi Ohale
CB	14	Oluwatosin Demehin
LB	5	Chidinma Okeke
CM	13	Deborah Abiodun
CM	10	Christy Ucheibe		(substituted off) 85'
RW	15	Rasheedat Ajibade (c)
AM	7	Toni Payne
LW	8	Asisat Oshoala	(yellow card) 37'	(substituted off) 73'
CF	6	Esther Okoronkwo		(substituted off) 61'
Substitutes:
GK	1	Tochukwu Oluehi
DF	4	Nicole Payne		(substituted on) 72'
MF	11	Jennifer Echegini
FW	9	Chinonyerem Macleans
FW	12	Uchenna Kanu		(substituted on) 85'
FW	17	Chinwendu Ihezuo		(substituted on) 73'
FW	18	Ifeoma Onumonu		(substituted on) 61'
Manager:
(United States) Randy Waldrum

Assistant referees:
Brooke Mayo (United States)
Kathryn Nesbitt (United States)
Fourth official:
Odette Hamilton (Jamaica)
Video assistant referee:
Paolo Valeri (Italy)
Assistant video assistant referee:
Lahlou Benbraham (Algeria)

=== Brazil vs Spain ===
31 July 2024
17:00

Brazil	0–2	Spain
	Report	Del Castillo 68'; Putellas 90+17'

Stade de Bordeaux, Bordeaux
Attendance: 14,497
Referee: Espen Eskås (Norway)

Brazil	Spain

GK	1	Lorena
RB	2	Antônia
CB	3	Tarciane
CB	21	Lauren
LB	6	Tamires		(substituted off) 61'
RM	14	Ludmila		(substituted off) 55'
CM	5	Duda Sampaio		(substituted off) 61'
CM	8	Vitória Yaya		(substituted off) 87'
LM	10	Marta (c)	(red card) 45+6'
CF	7	Kerolin		(substituted off) 62'
CF	9	Adriana
Substitutes:
GK	12	Tainá
DF	13	Yasmim		(substituted on) 61'
DF	15	Thaís
MF	17	Ana Vitória		(substituted on) 61'
FW	11	Jheniffer		(substituted on) 62'
FW	16	Gabi Nunes		(substituted on) 87'
FW	18	Gabi Portilho		(substituted on) 55'
Manager:
Arthur Elias			(yellow card) 81'

GK	13	Cata Coll		(substituted off) 75'
RB	2	Ona Batlle
CB	16	Laia Codina
CB	14	Laia Aleixandri
LB	18	Olga Carmona (c)
DM	3	Teresa Abelleira
CM	12	Patricia Guijarro		(substituted off) 59'
CM	15	Eva Navarro		(substituted off) 46'
RF	7	Athenea del Castillo
CF	10	Jenni Hermoso		(substituted off) 59'
LF	17	Lucía García		(substituted off) 46'
Substitutes:
GK	1	Misa Rodríguez		(substituted on) 75'
DF	20	María Méndez
MF	6	Aitana Bonmatí		(substituted on) 59'
MF	11	Alexia Putellas		(substituted on) 59'
FW	8	Mariona Caldentey		(substituted on) 46'
FW	9	Salma Paralluelo		(substituted on) 46'
FW	21	Alba Redondo
Manager:
Montserrat Tomé			(yellow card) 84'

Assistant referees:
Jan Erik Engan (Norway)
Isaak Bashevkin (Norway)
Fourth official:
Jelena Cvetković (Serbia)
Video assistant referee:
Rob Dieperink (Netherlands)
Assistant video assistant referee:
Rodrigo Carvajal (Chile)

=== Japan vs Nigeria ===
31 July 2024
17:00

Japan	3–1	Nigeria
Hamano 22'; Tanaka 32'; Kitagawa 45+5'	Report	Echegini 42'

Stade de la Beaujoire, Nantes
Attendance: 6,480
Referee: Emikar Calderas (Venezuela)

Japan	Nigeria

GK	1	Ayaka Yamashita
RB	20	Miyabi Moriya	(substituted off) 80'
CB	5	Hana Takahashi
CB	4	Saki Kumagai (c)
CB	21	Rion Ishikawa
LB	13	Hikaru Kitagawa	(substituted off) 60'
CM	17	Maika Hamano
CM	14	Yui Hasegawa	(substituted off) 60'
CM	16	Honoka Hayashi
CF	11	Mina Tanaka	(substituted off) 46'
CF	9	Riko Ueki	(substituted off) 90+3'
Substitutes:
GK	18	Chika Hirao
DF	3	Moeka Minami
MF	7	Hinata Miyazawa	(substituted on) 60'
MF	8	Kiko Seike	(substituted on) 46'
MF	10	Fuka Nagano	(substituted on) 60'
MF	12	Momoko Tanikawa	(substituted on) 90+3'
FW	19	Remina Chiba	(substituted on) 80'
Manager:
Futoshi Ikeda

GK	16	Chiamaka Nnadozie
RB	2	Michelle Alozie
CB	3	Osinachi Ohale		(substituted off) 90+1'
CB	14	Oluwatosin Demehin	(yellow card) 45+4'
LB	5	Chidinma Okeke		(substituted off) 46'
CM	10	Christy Ucheibe
CM	13	Deborah Abiodun		(substituted off) 75'
RW	15	Rasheedat Ajibade (c)
AM	11	Jennifer Echegini
LW	7	Toni Payne
CF	8	Asisat Oshoala		(substituted off) 60'
Substitutes:
GK	1	Tochukwu Oluehi
DF	4	Nicole Payne		(substituted on) 46'
FW	6	Esther Okoronkwo		(substituted on) 75'
FW	9	Chinonyerem Macleans
FW	12	Uchenna Kanu		(substituted on) 90+1'
FW	17	Chinwendu Ihezuo		(substituted on) 60'
FW	18	Ifeoma Onumonu
Manager:
(United States) Randy Waldrum

Assistant referees:
Migdalia Rodríguez (Venezuela)
Mary Blanco (Colombia)
Fourth official:
Odette Hamilton (Jamaica)
Video assistant referee:
Tatiana Guzmán (Nicaragua)
Assistant video assistant referee:
Guillermo Pacheco (Mexico)

== Discipline ==
Fair play points would have been used as a tiebreaker if the overall and head-to-head records of teams were tied. These were calculated based on yellow and red cards received in all group matches as follows:

- first yellow card: minus 1 point;
- indirect red card (second yellow card): minus 3 points;
- direct red card: minus 4 points;
- yellow card and direct red card: minus 5 points;

Only one of the above deductions could be applied to a player in a single match.

Team	Match 1				Match 2				Match 3				Points
Team	Booked	(yellow card) (yellow-red card)	Sent off (straight red)	(yellow card) (red card)	Booked	(yellow card) (yellow-red card)	Sent off (straight red)	(yellow card) (red card)	Booked	(yellow card) (yellow-red card)	Sent off (straight red)	(yellow card) (red card)	Points
Nigeria									1				–1
Japan					1								–1
Spain	2								1				–3
Brazil	1				2				1		1		–8
