= Football at the 2024 Summer Olympics – Women's tournament final =

2024 Summer Olympic women's football final
- Parc des Princes in Paris hosted the final
- Event: Football at the 2024 Summer Olympics – Women's tournament
Brazil	United States
(Brazil)	(United States)
0	1
- Date: 10 August 2024
- Venue: Parc des Princes, Paris
- Referee: Tess Olofsson (Sweden)
- Attendance: 43,813
- Weather: Sunny; 26 °C (79 °F); 53% humidity

The 2024 Summer Olympic women's football gold medal match was a football match to determine the winners of the women's football tournament at the 2024 Summer Olympics. The match was the eighth final of the women's football tournament at the Olympics, a quadrennial tournament contested by the women's national teams of the member associations of FIFA to decide the Olympic champions. The match took place at Parc des Princes in Paris, France, on 10 August 2024. This was the first Olympic women's football final to take place after the men's tournament final.

== Background ==
This was Brazil's third Olympic final, having lost both the 2004 and 2008 finals to the United States after extra time. Overall, this was their fourth major tournament final, having lost the 2007 Women's World Cup final to Germany.

This was the sixth Olympic final for the U.S., with them winning four of the first five Olympic women's football tournament finals dating back to 1996. Their most recent final was in 2012 victory against Japan and their previous final loss was suffered against Norway in 2000. Overall, this was their 11th major tournament final, having won in the 1991, 1999, 2015, and 2019 Women's World Cup finals and lost to Japan in 2011.

== Venue ==
The final was held at the Parc des Princes in Paris.

The stadium first opened in 1897, and had been refurbished twice since 1972, first for the 1998 FIFA World Cup, and then for the UEFA Euro 2016. It hosted the UEFA Euro finals in 1960 and 1984. It also hosted some matches for the 1938 and 1998 World Cups, the 2019 Women's World Cup, and the three aforementioned UEFA Euros.

== Route to the final ==
Brazil
Round
United States
Opponent
Result
Group stage
Opponent
Result
Nigeria
1–0
Match 1
Zambia
3–0
Japan
1–2
Match 2
Germany
4–1
Spain
0–2
Match 3
Australia
2–1
Group C third place

Pos	Team	Pld	Pts
1	Spain	3	9
2	Japan	3	6
3	Brazil	3	3
4	Nigeria	3	0

Source: FIFA
Final standings
Group B winners

Pos	Team	Pld	Pts
1	United States	3	9
2	Germany	3	6
3	Australia	3	3
4	Zambia	3	0

Source: FIFA
Opponent
Result
Knockout stage
Opponent
Result
France
1–0
Quarter-finals
Japan
1–0 (a.e.t.)
Spain
4–2
Semi-finals
Germany
1–0 (a.e.t.)

== Match ==
=== Details ===
10 August 2024
17:00

Brazil	0–1	United States
	Report	Swanson 57'

Parc des Princes, Paris
Attendance: 43,813
Referee: Tess Olofsson (Sweden)

Brazil	United States

GK	1	Lorena
CB	15	Thaís
CB	21	Lauren		(substituted off) 84'
CB	3	Tarciane	(yellow card) 81'
RM	9	Adriana (c)
CM	8	Vitória Yaya		(substituted off) 50'
CM	5	Duda Sampaio		(substituted off) 61'
LM	13	Yasmim
RF	18	Gabi Portilho
CF	11	Jheniffer		(substituted off) 61'
LF	14	Ludmila		(substituted off) 61'
Substitutes:
GK	12	Tainá
DF	4	Rafaelle Souza		(substituted on) 84'
MF	17	Ana Vitória		(substituted on) 50'
MF	20	Angelina		(substituted on) 61'
FW	10	Marta		(substituted on) 61'
FW	16	Gabi Nunes
FW	19	Priscila		(substituted on) 61'
Manager:
Arthur Elias

GK	1	Alyssa Naeher
RB	2	Emily Fox
CB	4	Naomi Girma
CB	12	Tierna Davidson	(substituted off) 74'
LB	7	Crystal Dunn
DM	3	Korbin Albert
CM	17	Sam Coffey
CM	10	Lindsey Horan (c)
RF	5	Trinity Rodman
CF	9	Mallory Swanson	(substituted off) 90+5'
LF	11	Sophia Smith	(substituted off) 84'
Substitutes:
GK	18	Casey Murphy
DF	6	Casey Krueger	(substituted on) 90+5'
DF	13	Jenna Nighswonger
MF	14	Emily Sonnett	(substituted on) 74'
MF	16	Rose Lavelle
FW	8	Lynn Williams	(substituted on) 84'
FW	15	Jaedyn Shaw
Manager:
(United Kingdom) Emma Hayes

Assistant referees:
Almira Spahić (Sweden)
Francesca Di Monte (Italy)
Fourth official:
Rebecca Welch (Great Britain)
Reserve assistant referee:
Franca Overtoom (Netherlands)
Video assistant referee:
Ivan Bebek (Croatia)
Assistant video assistant referees:
Carlos del Cerro Grande (Spain)
Jérôme Brisard (France)

Match rules

- 90 minutes
- 30 minutes of extra time if necessary
- Penalty shoot-out if scores still level
- Maximum of seven named substitutes
- Maximum of five substitutions, with a sixth allowed in extra time
- Maximum of three substitution opportunities, with a fourth allowed in extra time
