= Football at the 2024 Summer Olympics – Women's tournament =

2024 Women's Olympic Football Tournament

Tournament details
- Host country: France
- Dates: 25 July – 10 August
- Teams: 12 (from 6 confederations)
- Venues: 7 (in 7 host cities)

Final positions
- Champions: United States (5th title)
- Runners-up: Brazil
- Third place: Germany
- Fourth place: Spain

Tournament statistics
- Matches played: 26
- Goals scored: 76 (2.92 per match)
- Attendance: 398,699 (15,335 per match)
- Top scorer(s): (France) Marie-Antoinette Katoto (5 goals)

The women's football tournament at the 2024 Summer Olympics was held from 25 July to 10 August 2024. It was the eighth edition of the women's Olympic football tournament. Together with the men's competition, the 2024 Summer Olympics football tournament was held at seven stadiums in seven cities in France.

The United States won a record-extending fifth gold medal, and their first since 2012, defeating Brazil 1–0 in the final, held at Parc des Princes in Paris.

== Schedule ==
The schedule was as follows.

Legend
G	Group stage	¼	Quarter-finals	½	Semi-finals	B	Bronze medal match	F	Gold medal match

Thu 25	Fri 26	Sat 27	Sun 28	Mon 29	Tue 30	Wed 31	Thu 1	Fri 2	Sat 3	Sun 4	Mon 5	Tue 6	Wed 7	Thu 8	Fri 9	Sat 10
GS			GS			GS			QF			SF			B	F

== Qualification ==
In addition to host nation France, eleven women's national teams qualified from six separate continental confederations. The Organising Committee for FIFA Competitions ratified the distribution of spots at their meeting on 24 February 2022.

Means of qualification	Dates (Note: Dates and venues are those of final tournaments (or final round of qualification tournaments); various qualification stages may precede these matches.)	Venue(s)	Berth(s)	Qualified
Host nation	—N/a	—N/a	1	France
2022 CONCACAF W Championship	4–18 July 2022	Mexico	1	United States
2022 Copa América Femenina	8–30 July 2022	Colombia	2	Brazil; Colombia
CONCACAF play-off	22–26 September 2023	Jamaica; Canada	1	Canada
2024 OFC Olympic Qualifying Tournament	7–19 February 2024	Samoa	1	New Zealand
2024 UEFA Women's Nations League Finals	23–28 February 2024	Multiple	2	Spain; Germany
2024 AFC Olympic Qualifying Tournament	24–28 February 2024	Multiple	2	Australia; Japan
2024 CAF Olympic Qualifying Tournament	5–9 April 2024	Multiple	2	Nigeria; Zambia
Total			12	

Sweden, runners-up of the 2016 and 2020 Olympic tournaments, failed to qualify for the 2024 tournament after being eliminated in the group stage of the 2023–24 UEFA Women's Nations League.

== Venues ==
Marseille	Décines-Charpieu (Lyon Area)	Paris
Stade de Marseille	Stade de Lyon	Parc des Princes
Capacity: 67,394	Capacity: 59,186	Capacity: 47,929
Location of the host cities of the women's football tournament of the 2024 Summer Olympics.		Bordeaux
Location of the host cities of the women's football tournament of the 2024 Summer Olympics.		Stade de Bordeaux
Location of the host cities of the women's football tournament of the 2024 Summer Olympics.		Capacity: 42,115
Saint-Étienne	Nice	Nantes
Stade Geoffroy-Guichard	Stade de Nice	Stade de la Beaujoire
Capacity: 41,965	Capacity: 36,178	Capacity: 35,322

== Squads ==
The women's tournament was a full international tournament with no restrictions on age. Each team had to submit a squad of 18 players, two of whom had to be goalkeepers. Each team could also name a list of four alternate players, who could replace any player in the squad in case of injury during the tournament.

== Match officials ==
On 3 April 2024, FIFA released the list of match referees that would officiate at the Olympic Games.

Match officials (Note: Female field referees are shown in the table. During the tournament, mixed officials were appointed for some matches.)
Confederation	Referee	Assistant referees
AFC	Yoshimi Yamashita (Japan)	Makoto Bozono (Japan); Naomi Teshirogi (Japan)
AFC	Kim Yu-jeong (South Korea)	Joanna Charaktis (Australia); Park Mi-suk (South Korea)
CAF	Bouchra Karboubi (Morocco)	Fatiha Jermoumi (Morocco); Diana Chikotesha (Zambia)
CONCACAF	Katia García (Mexico)	Karen Díaz (Mexico); Sandra Ramírez (Mexico)
CONCACAF	Tori Penso (United States)	Brooke Mayo (United States); Kathryn Nesbitt (United States)
CONMEBOL	Edina Alves Batista (Brazil)	Neuza Back (Brazil); Fabrini Bevilaqua (Brazil)
CONMEBOL	Emikar Calderas (Venezuela)	Mary Blanco (Colombia); Migdalia Rodríguez (Venezuela)
UEFA	Rebecca Welch (Great Britain)	Emily Carney (Great Britain); Franca Overtoom (Netherlands)
UEFA	Tess Olofsson (Sweden)	Francesca Di Monte (Italy); Almira Spahić (Sweden)

Support officials
Confederation	Referee
AFC	Veronika Bernatskaia (Kyrgyzstan)
CAF	Shamirah Nabadda (Uganda)
CONCACAF	Odette Hamilton (Jamaica)
CONMEBOL	Anahí Fernández (Uruguay)
UEFA	Frida Klarlund (Denmark)
UEFA	Jelena Cvetković (Serbia)

Video assistant referees
Confederation	Video assistant referee
Male officials
AFC	Khamis Al-Marri (Qatar)
AFC	Sivakorn Pu-udom (Thailand)
CAF	Lahlou Benbraham (Algeria)
CAF	Mahmoud Ashour (Egypt)
CONCACAF	Daneon Parchment (Jamaica)
CONCACAF	Guillermo Pacheco (Mexico)
CONMEBOL	Héctor Paletta (Argentina)
CONMEBOL	Rodrigo Carvajal (Chile)
CONMEBOL	Leodán González (Uruguay)
UEFA	Ivan Bebek (Croatia)
UEFA	David Coote (Great Britain)
UEFA	Jérôme Brisard (France)
UEFA	Paolo Valeri (Italy)
UEFA	Rob Dieperink (Netherlands)
UEFA	Ovidiu Hațegan (Romania)
UEFA	Carlos del Cerro Grande (Spain)
Female officials
AFC	Kate Jacewicz (Australia)
CONCACAF	Tatiana Guzmán (Nicaragua)
CONMEBOL	Daiane Muniz (Brazil)
UEFA	Katalin Kulcsár (Hungary)

== Draw ==
The draw for the tournament was held on 20 March 2024, 20:00 CET (UTC+1), at the Pulse building in Saint-Denis, France.

The 12 teams were drawn into three groups of four teams. The hosts France were automatically seeded into Pot 1 and assigned to position A1 while the remaining teams were seeded into their respective pots based on the FIFA Women's World Ranking released on 15 March 2024 (shown in parentheses below). No group could contain more than one team from each confederation.

Pot 1	Pot 2	Pot 3	Pot 4 (Note: Teams from CAF were in the qualifying phase and were not known at the time of the draw, they were drawn originally as CAF 1 and CAF 2.)
France (3) (assigned to A1); Spain (1); United States (4)	Germany (5); Japan (7); Canada (9)	Brazil (10); Australia (12); Colombia (23)	New Zealand (28); Nigeria (36); Zambia (65)

== Group stage ==
The competing countries were divided into three groups of four teams, denoted as groups A, B, and C. Teams in each group played one another in a round-robin basis, with the top two teams of each group and the two best third-placed teams advancing to the quarter-finals.

All times are local, CEST (UTC+2).

=== Tiebreakers ===
The ranking of teams in the group stage was determined as follows:

1. Points obtained in all group matches (three points for a win, one for a draw, none for a defeat);
2. Goal difference in all group matches;
3. Number of goals scored in all group matches;
4. Points obtained in the matches played between the teams in question;
5. Goal difference in the matches played between the teams in question;
6. Number of goals scored in the matches played between the teams in question;
7. Fair play points in all group matches (only one deduction could be applied to a player in a single match):
  - Yellow card: −1 point;
  - Indirect red card (second yellow card): −3 points;
  - Direct red card: −4 points;
  - Yellow card and direct red card: −5 points;
8. Drawing of lots.

=== Group A ===
Pos	Team	Pld	W	D	L	GF	GA	GD	Pts	Qualification
1	France (H)	3	2	0	1	6	5	+1	6	Advance to knockout stage
2	Canada	3	3	0	0	5	2	+3	3 (Note: On 27 July 2024, Canada was penalized 6 points by FIFA for their coaching staff's involvement in illegal drone spying at an official training venue. The decision was upheld by CAS on 31 July.)	Advance to knockout stage
3	Colombia	3	1	0	2	4	4	0	3	Advance to knockout stage
4	New Zealand	3	0	0	3	2	6	−4	0	

Source: FIFA
(H) Hosts
Notes:
25 July 2024
17:00

Canada	2–1	New Zealand
Lacasse 45+4'; Viens 79'	Report	Barry 13'

Stade Geoffroy-Guichard, Saint-Étienne
Attendance: 2,674
Referee: Tess Olofsson (Sweden)
25 July 2024
21:00

France	3–2	Colombia
Katoto 6', 42'; Dali 18'	Report	Usme 54' (pen.); Paví 64'

Stade de Lyon, Décines-Charpieu
Attendance: 29,208
Referee: Tori Penso (United States)

28 July 2024
17:00

New Zealand	0–2	Colombia
	Report	Restrepo 27'; Santos 72'

Stade de Lyon, Décines-Charpieu
Attendance: 5,212
Referee: Kim Yu-jeong (South Korea)
28 July 2024
21:00

France	1–2	Canada
Katoto 42'	Report	Fleming 58'; Gilles 90+12'

Stade Geoffroy-Guichard, Saint-Étienne
Attendance: 17,550
Referee: Bouchra Karboubi (Morocco)

31 July 2024
21:00

New Zealand	1–2	France
Taylor 43'	Report	Katoto 22', 49'

Stade de Lyon, Décines-Charpieu
Attendance: 21,946
Referee: Edina Alves Batista (Brazil)
31 July 2024
21:00

Colombia	0–1	Canada
	Report	Gilles 61'

Stade de Nice, Nice
Attendance: 5,388
Referee: Rebecca Welch (Great Britain)

=== Group B ===
Pos	Team	Pld	W	D	L	GF	GA	GD	Pts	Qualification
1	United States	3	3	0	0	9	2	+7	9	Advance to knockout stage
2	Germany	3	2	0	1	8	5	+3	6	Advance to knockout stage
3	Australia	3	1	0	2	7	10	−3	3	
4	Zambia	3	0	0	3	6	13	−7	0	

Source: FIFA
25 July 2024
19:00

Germany	3–0	Australia
Hegering 24'; Schüller 64'; Brand 68'	Report

Stade de Marseille, Marseille
Attendance: 9,731
Referee: Katia García (Mexico)
25 July 2024
21:00

United States	3–0	Zambia
Rodman 17'; Swanson 24', 25'	Report

Stade de Nice, Nice
Attendance: 5,550
Referee: Ramon Abatti (Brazil)

28 July 2024
19:00

Australia	6–5	Zambia
Kennedy 7'; Raso 35'; Musole 58' (o.g.); Catley 65', 78' (pen.); Heyman 90'	Report	B. Banda 1', 33', 45+2'; Kundananji 21', 56'

Stade de Nice, Nice
Attendance: 4,441
Referee: Emikar Calderas (Venezuela)
28 July 2024
21:00

United States	4–1	Germany
Smith 11', 44'; Swanson 26'; Williams 89'	Report	Gwinn 22'

Stade de Marseille, Marseille
Attendance: 12,845
Referee: Yael Falcón (Argentina)

31 July 2024
19:00

Australia	1–2	United States
Kennedy 90+2'	Report	Rodman 43'; Albert 77'

Stade de Marseille, Marseille
Attendance: 13,036
Referee: François Letexier (France)
31 July 2024
19:00

Zambia	1–4	Germany
B. Banda 49'	Report	Schüller 10', 61'; Bühl 47'; Senß 90+5'

Stade Geoffroy-Guichard, Saint-Étienne
Attendance: 2,642
Referee: Yoshimi Yamashita (Japan)

=== Group C ===
Pos	Team	Pld	W	D	L	GF	GA	GD	Pts	Qualification
1	Spain	3	3	0	0	5	1	+4	9	Advance to knockout stage
2	Japan	3	2	0	1	6	4	+2	6	Advance to knockout stage
3	Brazil	3	1	0	2	2	4	−2	3	Advance to knockout stage
4	Nigeria	3	0	0	3	1	5	−4	0	

Source: FIFA
25 July 2024
17:00

Spain	2–1	Japan
Bonmatí 22'; Caldentey 74'	Report	Fujino 13'

Stade de la Beaujoire, Nantes
Attendance: 10,377
Referee: Bouchra Karboubi (Morocco)
25 July 2024
19:00

Nigeria	0–1	Brazil
	Report	Gabi Nunes 37'

Stade de Bordeaux, Bordeaux
Attendance: 6,244
Referee: Kim Yu-jeong (South Korea)

28 July 2024
17:00

Brazil	1–2	Japan
Jheniffer 56'	Report	Kumagai 90+2' (pen.); Tanikawa 90+6'

Parc des Princes, Paris
Attendance: 40,918
Referee: Rebecca Welch (Great Britain)
28 July 2024
19:00

Spain	1–0	Nigeria
Putellas 85'	Report

Stade de la Beaujoire, Nantes
Attendance: 11,079
Referee: Tori Penso (United States)

31 July 2024
17:00

Brazil	0–2	Spain
	Report	Del Castillo 68'; Putellas 90+17'

Stade de Bordeaux, Bordeaux
Attendance: 14,497
Referee: Espen Eskås (Norway)
31 July 2024
17:00

Japan	3–1	Nigeria
Hamano 22'; Tanaka 32'; Kitagawa 45+5'	Report	Echegini 42'

Stade de la Beaujoire, Nantes
Attendance: 6,480
Referee: Emikar Calderas (Venezuela)

=== Ranking of third-placed teams ===
Pos	Grp	Team	Pld	W	D	L	GF	GA	GD	Pts	Qualification
1	A	Colombia	3	1	0	2	4	4	0	3	Advance to knockout stage
2	C	Brazil	3	1	0	2	2	4	−2	3	Advance to knockout stage
3	B	Australia	3	1	0	2	7	10	−3	3	

Source: FIFA
Rules for classification: 1) Points; 2) Goal difference; 3) Goals scored; 4) Fair play points in all group matches; 5) Drawing of lots.

== Knockout stage ==
In the knockout stage, if a match was level at the end of regulation time, extra time was played (two periods of 15 minutes each), and followed, if necessary, by a penalty shoot-out to determine the winner.

=== Bracket ===
Quarter-finals
3 August – Nantes
France	0
Brazil	1
3 August – Décines-Charpieu
Spain (p)	2 (4)
Colombia	2 (2)
3 August – Paris
United States (a.e.t.)	1
Japan	0
3 August – Marseille
Canada	0 (2)
Germany (p)	0 (4)

Semi-finals
6 August – Marseille
Brazil	4
Spain	2
6 August – Décines-Charpieu
United States (a.e.t.)	1
Germany	0

Gold medal match
10 August – Paris
Brazil	0
United States	1
Bronze medal match
9 August – Décines-Charpieu
Spain	0
Germany	1

=== Quarter-finals ===
3 August 2024
15:00

United States	1–0 (a.e.t.)	Japan
Rodman 105+2'	Report

Parc des Princes, Paris
Attendance: 43,004
Referee: Tess Olofsson (Sweden)

3 August 2024
17:00

Spain	2–2 (a.e.t.)	Colombia
Hermoso 79'; Paredes 90+7'	Report	Ramírez 12'; Santos 52'
Penalties
Caldentey (penalty scored); Navarro (penalty scored); Paralluelo (penalty scored); Bonmatí (penalty scored)	4–2	(penalty missed) Usme; (penalty scored) Vanegas; (penalty missed) Salazar; (penalty scored) Carabalí

Stade de Lyon, Décines-Charpieu
Attendance: 10,355
Referee: Katia García (Mexico)

3 August 2024
19:00

Canada	0–0 (a.e.t.)	Germany
	Report
Penalties
Quinn (penalty scored); Lawrence (penalty missed); Leon (penalty missed); Beckie (penalty scored)	2–4	(penalty scored) Gwinn; (penalty scored) Minge; (penalty missed) Lohmann; (penalty scored) Rauch; (penalty scored) Berger

Stade de Marseille, Marseille
Attendance: 12,517
Referee: Edina Alves Batista (Brazil)

3 August 2024
21:00

France	0–1	Brazil
	Report	Gabi Portilho 82'

Stade de la Beaujoire, Nantes
Attendance: 32,280
Referee: Tori Penso (United States)

=== Semi-finals ===
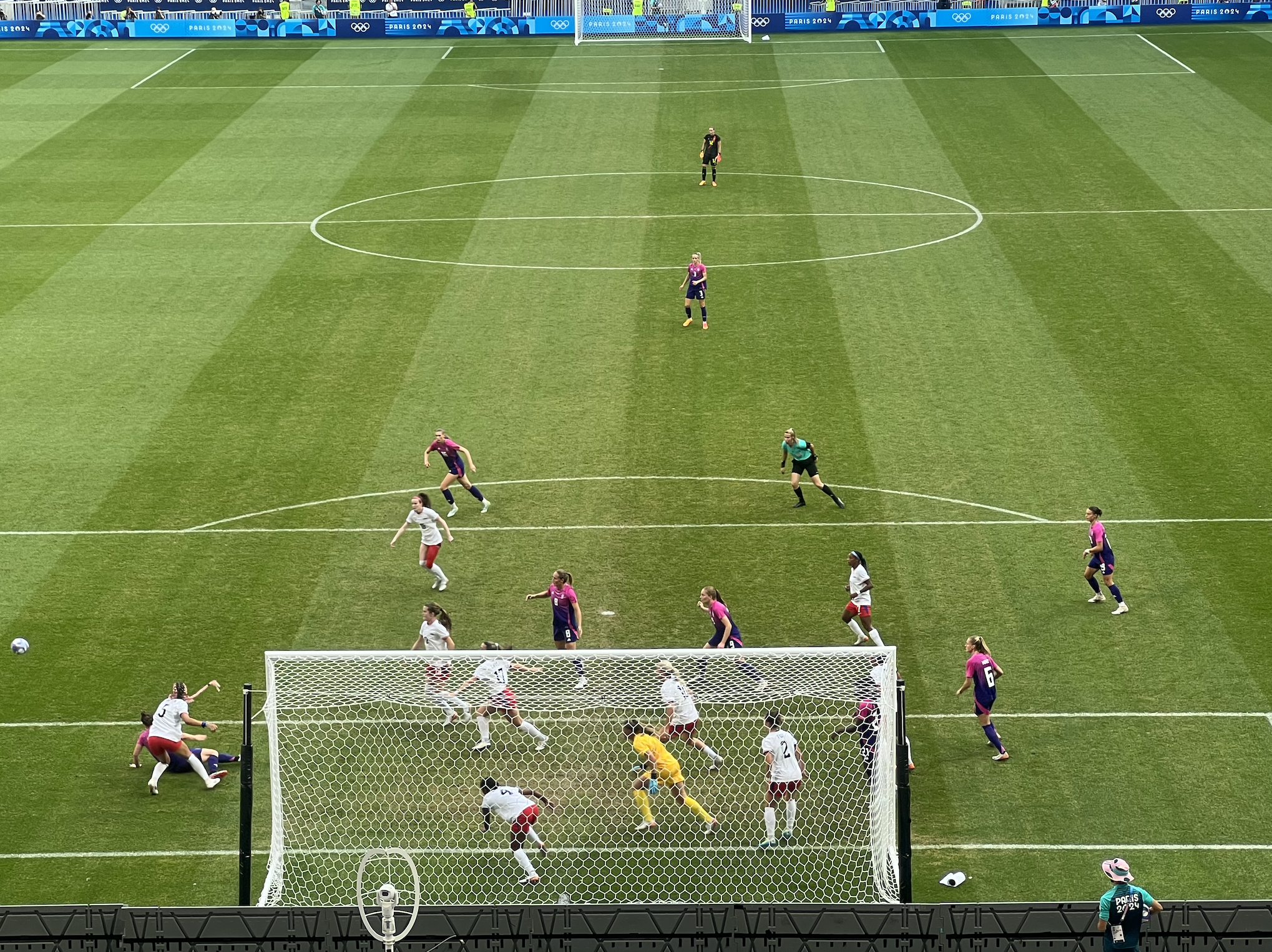
United States – Germany

6 August 2024
18:00

United States	1–0 (a.e.t.)	Germany
Smith 95'	Report

Stade de Lyon, Décines-Charpieu
Attendance: 11,716
Referee: Bouchra Karboubi (Morocco)

6 August 2024
21:00

Brazil	4–2	Spain
Paredes 6' (o.g.); Gabi Portilho 45+4'; Adriana 71'; Kerolin 90+1'	Report	Duda Sampaio 85' (o.g.); Paralluelo 90+12'

Stade de Marseille, Marseille
Attendance: 14,201
Referee: Rebecca Welch (Great Britain)

=== Bronze medal match ===
9 August 2024
15:00

Spain	0–1	Germany
	Report	Gwinn 65' (pen.)

Stade de Lyon, Décines-Charpieu
Attendance: 10,995
Referee: Katia García (Mexico)

=== Gold medal match ===
10 August 2024
17:00

Brazil	0–1	United States
	Report	Swanson 57'

Parc des Princes, Paris
Attendance: 43,813
Referee: Tess Olofsson (Sweden)

== Statistics ==
=== Goalscorers ===
There were 76 goals scored in 26 matches, for an average of 2.92 goals per match.

5 goals

- (France) Marie-Antoinette Katoto

4 goals

- (United States) Mallory Swanson
- (Zambia) Barbra Banda

3 goals

- (Germany) Lea Schüller
- (United States) Trinity Rodman
- (United States) Sophia Smith

2 goals

- (Australia) Steph Catley
- (Australia) Alanna Kennedy
- (Brazil) Gabi Portilho
- (Canada) Vanessa Gilles
- (Colombia) Leicy Santos
- (Germany) Giulia Gwinn
- (Spain) Alexia Putellas
- (Zambia) Racheal Kundananji

1 goal

- (Australia) Michelle Heyman
- (Australia) Hayley Raso
- (Brazil) Adriana
- (Brazil) Gabi Nunes
- (Brazil) Jheniffer
- (Brazil) Kerolin
- (Canada) Jessie Fleming
- (Canada) Cloé Lacasse
- (Canada) Evelyne Viens
- (Colombia) Manuela Paví
- (Colombia) Mayra Ramírez
- (Colombia) Marcela Restrepo
- (Colombia) Catalina Usme
- (France) Kenza Dali
- (Germany) Jule Brand
- (Germany) Klara Bühl
- (Germany) Marina Hegering
- (Germany) Elisa Senß
- (Japan) Aoba Fujino
- (Japan) Maika Hamano
- (Japan) Hikaru Kitagawa
- (Japan) Saki Kumagai
- (Japan) Mina Tanaka
- (Japan) Momoko Tanikawa
- (New Zealand) Mackenzie Barry
- (New Zealand) Kate Taylor
- (Nigeria) Jennifer Echegini
- (Spain) Aitana Bonmatí
- (Spain) Mariona Caldentey
- (Spain) Athenea del Castillo
- (Spain) Jenni Hermoso
- (Spain) Salma Paralluelo
- (Spain) Irene Paredes
- (United States) Korbin Albert
- (United States) Lynn Williams

1 own goal

- (Brazil) Duda Sampaio (against Spain)
- (Spain) Irene Paredes (against Brazil)
- (Zambia) Ngambo Musole (against Australia)

Source: IOC

== Final ranking ==
As per statistical convention in football, matches decided in extra time are counted as wins and losses, while matches decided by penalty shoot-outs are counted as draws.

Pos	Team	Pld	W	D	L	GF	GA	GD	Pts	Final result
1st place, gold medalist(s)	United States	6	6	0	0	12	2	+10	18	Gold medal
2nd place, silver medalist(s)	Brazil	6	3	0	3	7	7	0	9	Silver medal
3rd place, bronze medalist(s)	Germany	6	3	1	2	9	6	+3	10	Bronze medal
4	Spain	6	3	1	2	9	8	+1	10	Fourth place
5	Japan	4	2	0	2	6	5	+1	6	Eliminated in quarter-finals
6	France (H)	4	2	0	2	6	6	0	6	Eliminated in quarter-finals
7	Canada	4	3	1	0	5	2	+3	4 (Note: On 27 July 2024, Canada were penalized 6 points by FIFA for their coaching staff's involvement in illegal drone spying at an official training venue. The decision was upheld by CAS on 31 July.)	Eliminated in quarter-finals
8	Colombia	4	1	1	2	6	6	0	4	Eliminated in quarter-finals
9	Australia	3	1	0	2	7	10	−3	3	Eliminated in group stage
10	New Zealand	3	0	0	3	2	6	−4	0	Eliminated in group stage
11	Nigeria	3	0	0	3	1	5	−4	0	Eliminated in group stage
12	Zambia	3	0	0	3	6	13	−7	0	Eliminated in group stage

Source: IOC
(H) Hosts

== See also ==
- Football at the 2024 Summer Olympics – Men's tournament
