= Elisa Senß =

German footballer (born 1997)

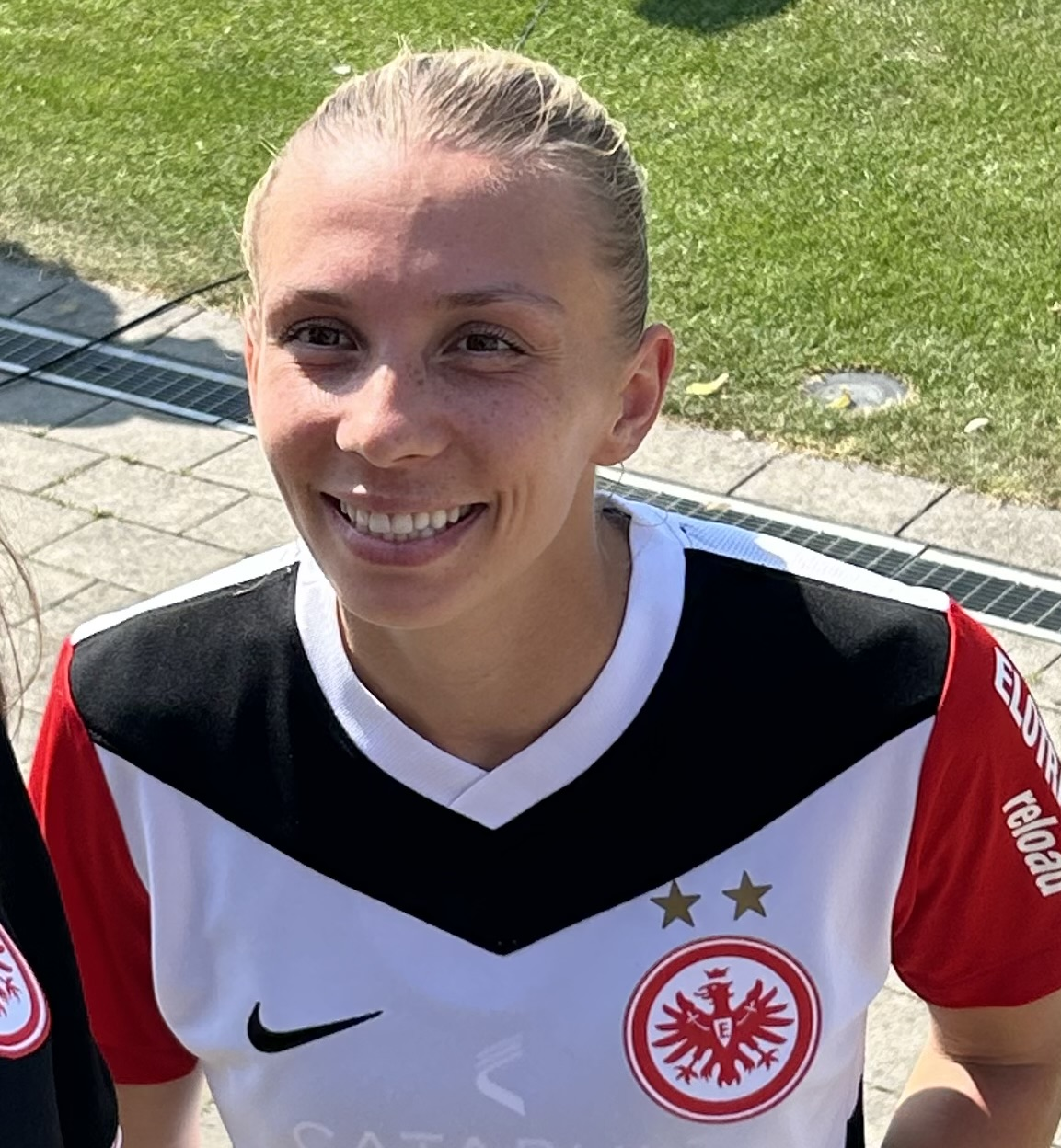
- Senß with Eintracht Frankfurt in 2024

Personal information
- Full name: Elisa Malin Senß
- Date of birth: 1 October 1997 (age 29)
- Place of birth: Oldenburg, Germany
- Height: 1.61 m (5 ft 3 in)
- Position: Midfielder

Team information
- Current team: Real Madrid
- Number: 20

Youth career
- 2002–2011: Ahlhorner SV
- 2011–2012: VfL Wittekind Wildeshausen
- 2012–2014: SV Meppen

Senior career*
Years	Team	Apps	(Gls)
2014–2019	SV Meppen	96	(30)
2019–2022	SGS Essen	62	(4)
2022–2024	Bayer Leverkusen	43	(1)
2024–2026	Eintracht Frankfurt	45	(8)
2026–	Real Madrid	10	(1)

International career^{‡}
2023–	Germany	38	(4)
Medal record
Women's football
Representing Germany
Olympic Games
Bronze medal – third place	2024 Paris	Team
UEFA Women's Nations League
Runner-up	2025
Third place	2024
- * Club domestic league appearances and goals as of 17:10, 21 November 2026 (UTC) ‡ National team caps and goals as of 19:20, 13 October 2026 (UTC)

Elisa Malin Senß (born 1 October 1997) is a German professional footballer who plays as a midfielder for Liga F club Real Madrid and the Germany national team.

== Club career ==
Senß is a youth academy graduate of SV Meppen. In May 2019, she joined SGS Essen on a two-year deal until June 2021. During her first season, Senß started 20 of 22 games in the league and played the entire 120 minutes of the DFB-Pokal final which Essen lost to Wolfsburg. Senß partook in 21 matches the following year and scored her first league goal for the club against her old club Meppen in a 3–1 victory. On 14 April 2021, she signed a contract extension with the club until June 2023. By the end of the 2021–22 season, Senß had played 62 league games for Essen, with four goals in the Bundesliga and three in the German cup.

On 23 May 2022, Bayer Leverkusen announced the signing of Senß on a three-year deal until June 2025. She was named as team's new captain in September 2022 and became a consistent performer — playing the eighth-most minutes of any Bundesliga player in 2022–23 — as Leverkusen finished fifth. Senß featured in 21 matches the following campaign, one that Leverkusen ended sixth overall.

On 11 March 2024, Eintracht Frankfurt announced the signing of Senß on a three-year contract, effective from July 2024. In 2024–25, Frankfurt finished third in the league, with Senß playing a pivotal role: she was the player with the fourth-most won tackles in the division, became an offensive threat with three goals and four assists, and became part of a midfield duo alongside Lisanne Gräwe. On 14 May 2026, Eintracht Frankfurt announced the departure of Senß after two seasons with the club.

On 11 June 2026, Senß joined Liga F side Real Madrid on a contract running until 2030.

== International career ==
Senß made her international debut for Germany on 1 December 2023 in a 3–0 win against Denmark. In July 2024, Senß was named in the squad for the 2024 Olympics. She won the Goal of the Month award in Germany for her volley against Zambia during the tournament, which was her first goal for the national team. The following year, Senß took part in the 2025 Euros. Playing alongside Sjoeke Nüsken as part of a double pivot, Senß helped Germany to reach the semi-final.

== Playing style ==
The holding midfielder has been described as a "tackling machine" by Der Spiegel and as a "small helper", owing to her short stature, by Sportschau.

Sometimes I am also underestimated physically. That's just my playing style, which my opponents don't account for, so I can surprise them.

— Senß in 2025 commenting on her robust style of play

== Personal life ==
Senß used to work as a medical assistant at Essen University Hospital when she was a SGS Essen player. She considers Lionel Messi as her idol.

== Career statistics ==
=== International ===
As of match played 13 October 2026

Appearances and goals by national team and year
National team	Year	Apps	Goals
Germany	2023	2	0
Germany	2024	13	1
Germany	2025	15	1
Germany	2026	8	2
Total		38	4

Scores and results list Germany's goal tally first, score column indicates score after each Senß goal.

List of international goals scored by Elisa Senß
No.	Date	Venue	Opponent	Score	Result	Competition
1	31 July 2024	Stade Geoffroy-Guichard, Saint-Étienne, France	Zambia	4–1	4–1	2024 Summer Olympics
2	4 April 2025	Tannadice Park, Dundee, Scotland	Scotland	1–0	4–0	2025 UEFA Women's Nations League
3	3 March 2026	Rudolf-Harbig-Stadion, Dresden, Germany	Slovenia	2–0	5–0	2027 FIFA World Cup qualification
4	7 March 2026	Lyse Arena, Stavanger, Norway	Norway	1–0	4–0	2027 FIFA World Cup qualification

== Honours ==
SGS Essen

- DFB-Pokal Frauen runner-up: 2019–20

Germany

- Summer Olympics bronze medal: 2024
- UEFA Women's Nations League third place: 2023–24

Individual

- Silbernes Lorbeerblatt: 2024
