= Montse Tomé =

Spanish footballer (born 1982)

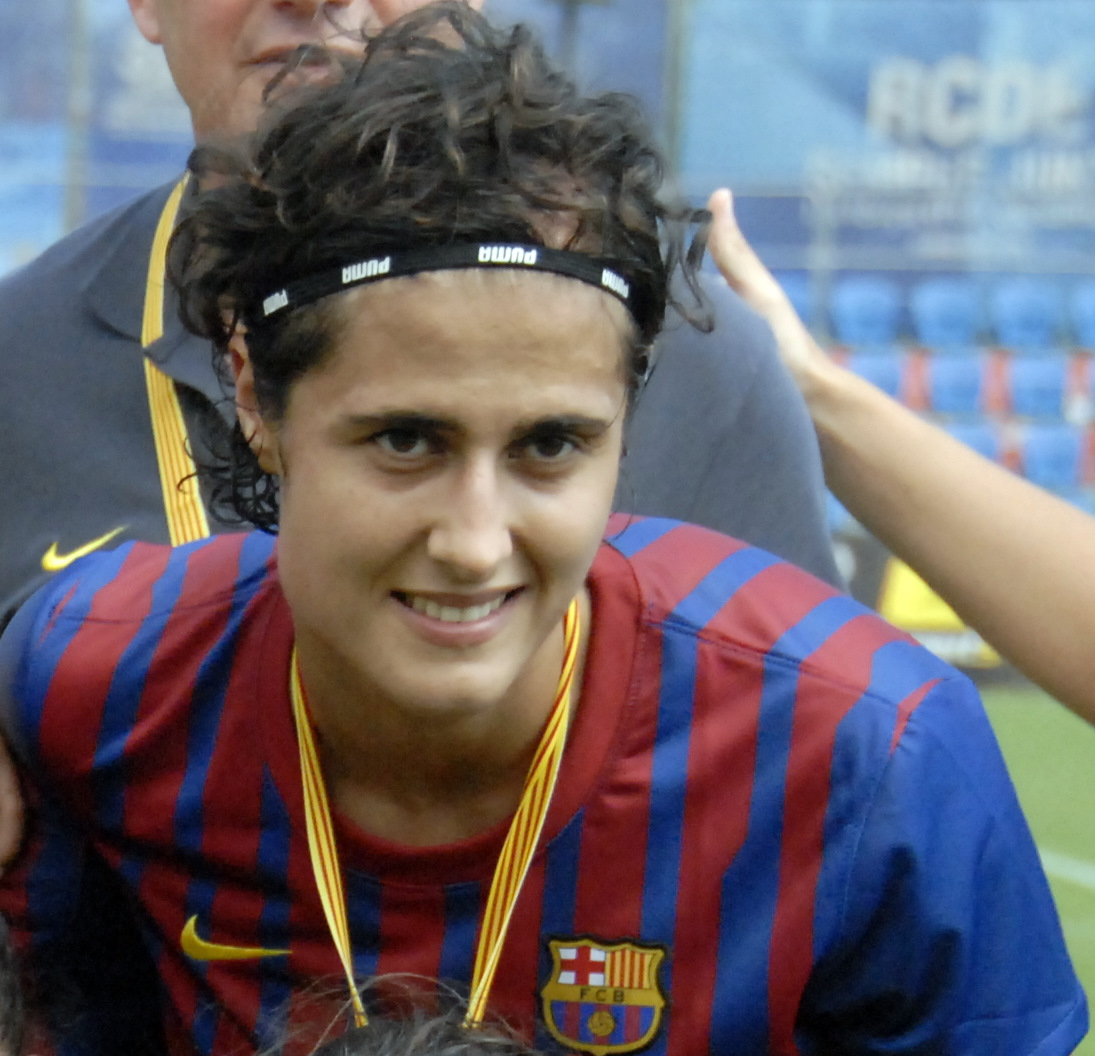
- 2011 Copa Catalunya

Personal information
- Full name: Montserrat Tomé Vázquez
- Date of birth: 11 May 1982 (age 44)
- Place of birth: Oviedo, Spain
- Height: 1.75 m (5 ft 9 in)
- Position: Midfielder

Team information
- Current team: Pachuca (Manager)

Senior career*
| Years | Team | Apps | (Gls) |
| 2002–2007 | Oviedo Moderno | 88+ | (22+) |
| 2007–2010 | Levante | 64 | (2) |
| 2010–2012 | Barcelona | 46 | (3) |
| 2012–2013 | Oviedo Moderno | | |

International career
| 2000–2001 | Spain U19 | | |
| 2003–2005 | Spain | 4 | (0) |

Managerial career
- 2023–2025: Spain
- 2026–: Pachuca
Medal record
Women's football
Representing Spain (as manager)
UEFA Women's Championship
| Runner-up | 2025 Switzerland |
UEFA Women's Nations League
| Winner | 2024 France–Netherlands–Spain |
- * Club domestic league appearances and goals

Montserrat Tomé Vázquez (born 11 May 1982) is a Spanish football manager and former footballer who is the current manager of Liga Femenil club Pachuca.

== Playing career ==
Tomé played for Oviedo Moderno, Levante and Barcelona in the Primera División, winning the championship with the latter two teams.

A former U-19 Euro runner-up, Tomé was a member of the senior national team during the 2005 Euro qualifying.

== Coaching career ==
On 5 September 2023, following the announcement of the departure of Jorge Vilda, Tomé, who served as assistant coach under Vilda at the 2023 FIFA Women's World Cup, was announced as the new head coach of the Spanish women's national team.

Tomé coached Spain to win the UEFA Women's Nations League in its inaugural year, defeating France 2–0 in the tournament's final.

Under Tomé's coaching, Spain finished as runners-up in the 2025 UEFA Women's Championship, losing 1–1 (3–1 on penalties) against England in the final.

On 11 August 2025, the Spanish Football Federation said Tomé's contract would not be renewed when it expires on 31 August, with the (RFEF) thanking Tomé for "her work, professionalism and dedication".

On 25 September 2026, Liga Femenil club Pachuca announced that Tome was being appointed as manager of the team, after previous manager Óscar Torres was sacked.

== Managerial statistics ==
As of match played 26 September 2026

Managerial record by team and tenure
| Team | Nat | From | To | Record | | | | | | | |
| Team | Nat | From | To | G | W | D | L | GF | GA | GD | Win % |
|---|---|---|---|---|---|---|---|---|---|---|---|
| Spain | (Spain) | 5 September 2023 | 11 August 2025 | 37 | 28 | 4 | 5 | 108 | 39 | +69 | 75.68 |
| Pachuca | (Mexico) | 24 September 2026 | | 1 | 1 | 0 | 0 | 4 | 1 | +3 | 100.00 |
| Total | | | | 38 | 29 | 4 | 5 | 112 | 40 | +72 | 76.32 |

== Honours ==
=== Player ===
Levante

- Primera División: 2007–08

Barcelona

- Primera División: 2011–12
- Copa de la Reina: 2011

=== Assistant manager ===
Spain

- FIFA Women's World Cup: 2023

=== Manager ===
Spain

- UEFA Women's Championship runner-up: 2025
- UEFA Women's Nations League: 2023–24
