= Bouchra Karboubi =

Moroccan association football referee

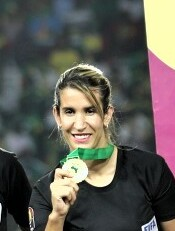
- Born: 15 May 1987 (age 39); Taza, Fez-Meknes, Morocco
- Other occupation: Police officer

Domestic
Years	League	Role
2020–	Botola	Referee

International
Years	League	Role
2015–	FIFA listed	Referee

Bouchra Karboubi (Arabic: بشرى كربوبي; born on 15 May 1987) is a Moroccan international association football referee, who has officiated in several matches during the final phase of both men's and women's continental competitions.

== Biography ==
She was born in 1987 in Taza in the northeast of Morocco, the youngest of five siblings. She started playing football in the youth category for a small team. In 2001, an arbitration school for men and women opened in her city. She became interested, stating: "I loved football, but I thought to myself: why not? It allowed me not to give up my passion, to learn the rules of the game...", even though her brothers initially reacted negatively. She mentioned: "I lived in a city where it's hchouma (shameful) for a girl to wear shorts to go on the field and mingle with men".

In 2007, Morocco created a national women's football championship. She had the opportunity to become a national referee, leaving Taza for Meknes, a much larger city neighboring Fes. "My family understood that it was serious and professional for me. One day my father came to see me at training in Meknes. That's when he ordered my brothers to respect my choice." She started refereeing in the first and second Moroccan women's divisions at the age of 19. Almost 10 years later, in 2016, she reached a new level by becoming an international referee.

In 2018, she participated in refereeing a continental competition for the first time, with a match in the final tournament of the 2018 Women's Africa Cup of Nations, held in Ghana, opposing Zambia to Equatorial Guinea. In 2020, she became the first woman to officiate a match in the top division of the men's professional championship in Morocco (Botola Pro). Later, she was designated as a member of the refereeing staff in the final match of the 2021 AFCON between Senegal and Egypt in Cameroon as a video assistant referee, and also officiated the final of the Moroccan Throne Cup.

Selected as one of the referees for the 2023 AFCON, in January 2024 she became the first woman from North Africa and the Arab world to officiate a men's AFCON match by refereeing the match between Guinea-Bissau and Nigeria in the third day of the group stage.

On April 3, 2024, FIFA announced that Karboubi was appointed to officiating pool for the 2024 Summer Olympics in Paris. She was assigned the opening round Group C match between Spain and Japan.
