= Ludmila (footballer) =

Brazilian footballer (born 1994)

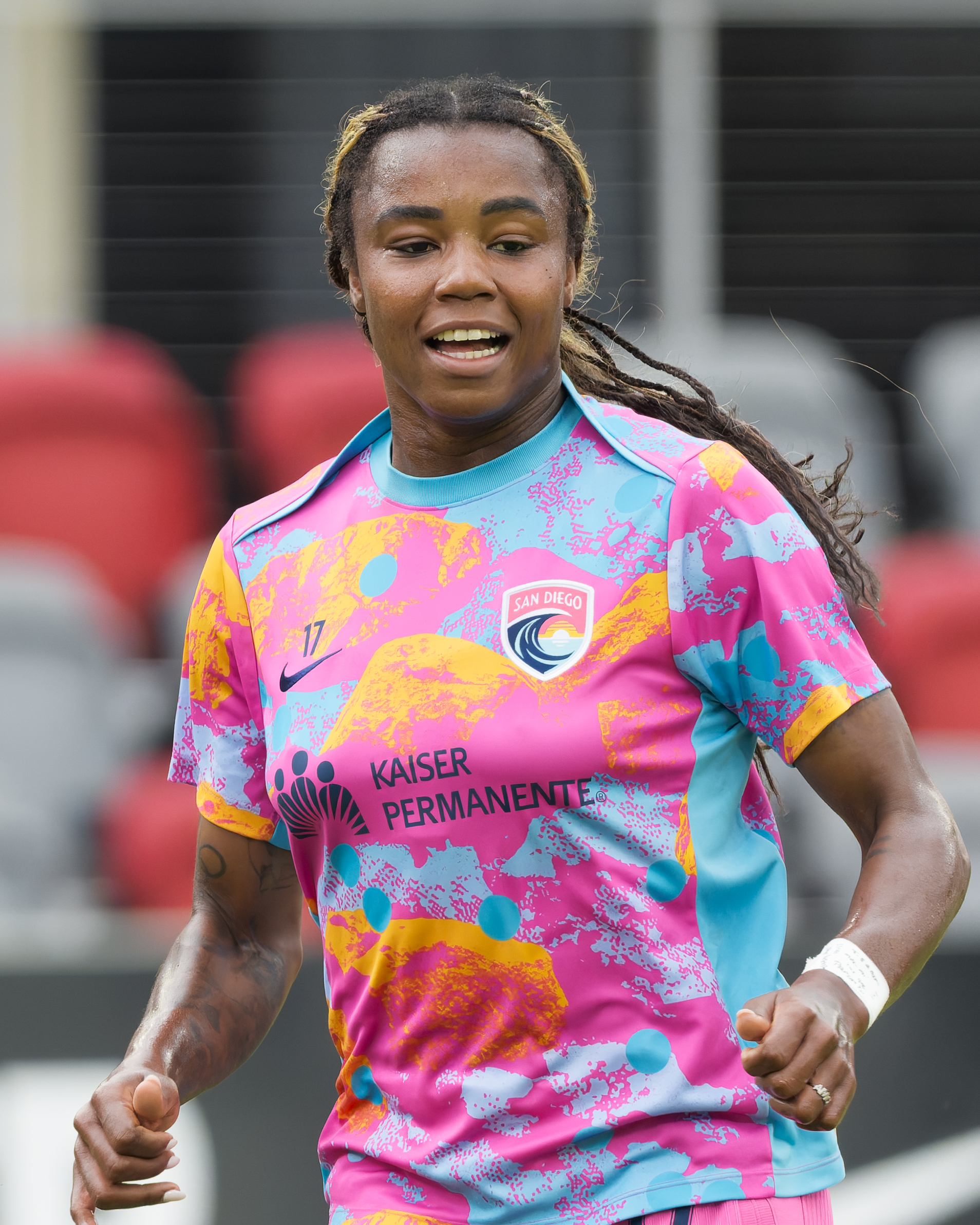
- Ludmila with San Diego Wave FC in 2026

Personal information
- Full name: Ludmila da Silva
- Date of birth: 1 December 1994 (age 31)
- Place of birth: Guarulhos, Brazil
- Height: 1.60 m (5 ft 3 in)
- Position: Forward

Team information
- Current team: San Diego Wave
- Number: 17

Youth career
- CA Juventus

Senior career*
Years	Team	Apps	(Gls)
2011	CA Juventus		
2012	São Caetano		
2013	Portuguesa		
2013	Rio Preto	6	(3)
2015–2017	São José	15	(6)
2017–2024	Atlético Madrid	137	(59)
2024–2025	Chicago Stars	31	(13)
2026–	San Diego Wave	28	(3)

International career^{‡}
2017–	Brazil	62	(6)
Medal record
Women's football
Representing Brazil
Olympic Games
Silver medal – second place	2024 Paris
- * Club domestic league appearances and goals as of 16:37, 15 November 2026 (UTC) ‡ National team caps and goals as of 23:10, 29 July 2024 (UTC)

Ludmila da Silva (born 1 December 1994), commonly known as Ludmila, is a Brazilian professional footballer who plays as a forward for San Diego Wave FC of the National Women's Soccer League (NWSL) and the Brazil national team.

== Club career ==
A high school athletics champion, Ludmila took up organized football at the relatively late age of 15. She was noticed by a scout from CA Juventus and then moved on to play for São Caetano, Portuguesa, Rio Preto and São José as a fast and strong winger.

=== Atlético Madrid ===
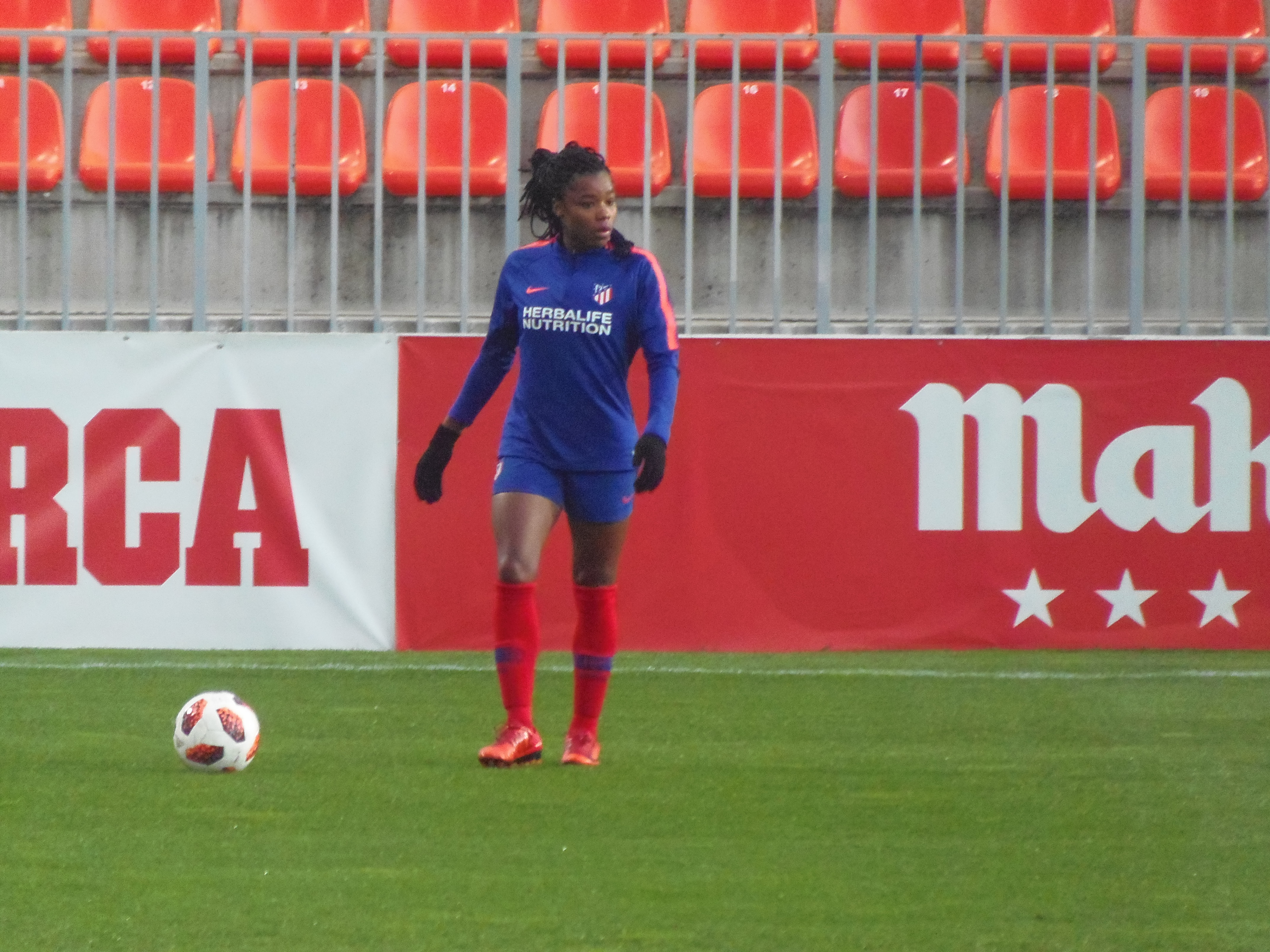
Ludmila playing for Atlético Madrid in November 2018

In August 2017, Ludmila agreed to a transfer to Spanish Primera División club Atlético Madrid. Her exceptional pace led her to be dubbed: "Road Runner". Good performances and six goals in the first half season prompted Atlético to extend her initial two-year contract by another year in December 2017.

In September 2018, Ludmila assisted the first goal and scored the second to eliminate Manchester City from the 2018–19 UEFA Women's Champions League Round of 32, securing Atlético's place in the Round of 16.

=== Chicago Stars ===
On 29 July 2024, the Chicago Red Stars (later named Chicago Stars FC) announced that they had signed Ludmila to a three-year contract through the 2026 season. She scored her first NWSL goal on September 21, 2024, lifting the team to a 1–0 victory over the San Diego Wave. The Red Stars would go on to qualify for the playoffs, where they lost to the Orlando Pride 4–1 in the first round. Ludmila was unable to play in the match, instead serving a three-game suspension following an altercation with Washington Spirit forward Rosemonde Kouassi during the penultimate game of the Red Stars' 2024 regular season.

In a 3–3 draw with the North Carolina Courage on 22 August 2025, Ludmila scored a ten-minute hat-trick to help the Stars come back from a 2–0 deficit and tie the game; her flurry of goals set an NWSL record for fastest hat-trick in league history. She was subsequently named the NWSL Player of the Week for the first time in her career.

=== San Diego Wave ===
On 13 January 2026, Ludmila was traded to San Diego Wave FC in exchange for $800,000 in intraleague transfer funds with a possible additional $200,000, a price that set the record for second-highest intraleague fee in NWSL history. She made her Wave debut on 14 March 2026, starting and playing the entirety of San Diego's season-opening loss to the Houston Dash. On 3 April, she scored her first goal for her new club, netting the lone goal in a 1–0 win over Boston Legacy FC. In a home match against the Denver Summit on 14 August, Ludmila made her 50th NWSL appearance.

== International career ==
Ludmila was part of the Brazilian under-20 selection at the 2014 South American U-20 Women's Championship in Uruguay, scoring three goals at the tournament. In the 2–0 final win over Paraguay, she won a penalty which Andressa converted, and then scored the second goal herself.

In June 2017, Ludmila was called up to the senior Brazil squad for the first time for a friendly match against Germany in Sandhausen. She reportedly did not have a passport and had to urgently obtain one to accept the call-up. She stated that national coach Emily Lima, previously her boss at Juventus and São José, was a mother figure to her. In Germany, Brazil fielded a weakened team as the match was outside FIFA-specified international dates and some regular players were unable to attend. Ludmila capitalised on an error by German goalkeeper Almuth Schult to mark her debut with a goal, but Brazil lost 3–1.

In previous training sessions with the national team, Ludmila had been stung by criticism from a team official who suggested she was good at running but did not know when to release the ball. Ludmila scored the only goal in a behind closed doors training match against Canada in Ottawa on 4 September 2018.

Ludmila was named to the Brazil roster that competed in the 2024 Paris Olympics. She started the tournament final against the United States and appeared to have scored the opening goal in the 16th minute, only to have the strike ruled as offside. The United States would go on to beat Ludmila and Brazil 1–0 on a goal from Mallory Swanson.

=== International goals ===
No.	Date	Venue	Opponent	Score	Result	Competition
1.	4 July 2017	BWT-Stadion am Hardtwald, Sandhausen, Germany	Germany	1–1	1–3	Friendly
2.	29 August 2019	Pacaembu Stadium, São Paulo, Brazil	Argentina	1–0	5–0	2019 Torneio Internacional de Futebol Feminino
3.	10 March 2020	Stade de l'Épopée, Calais, France	Canada	2–0	2–2	2020 Tournoi de France
4.	24 July 2021	Miyagi Stadium, Rifu, Japan	Netherlands	3–2	3–3	2020 Summer Olympics
5.	22 February 2023	Toyota Stadium, Frisco, United States	United States	1–2	1–2	2023 SheBelieves Cup
6.	2 December 2025	Estádio Municipal de Aveiro, Aveiro, Portugal	Portugal	2–0	5–0	Friendly
7.	12 April 2026	Arena Pantanal, Cuiabá, Brazil	South Korea	2–0	5–1	2026 FIFA Series

== Personal life ==
Ludmila is Afro-Brazilian and was brought up in a favela by her aunt, as her mother left the family and her father died during her childhood. In 2016, her older sister also died.

== Honours ==
Brazil

- Summer Olympics silver medal: 2024
