= Tess Olofsson =

Swedish football referee (born 1988)

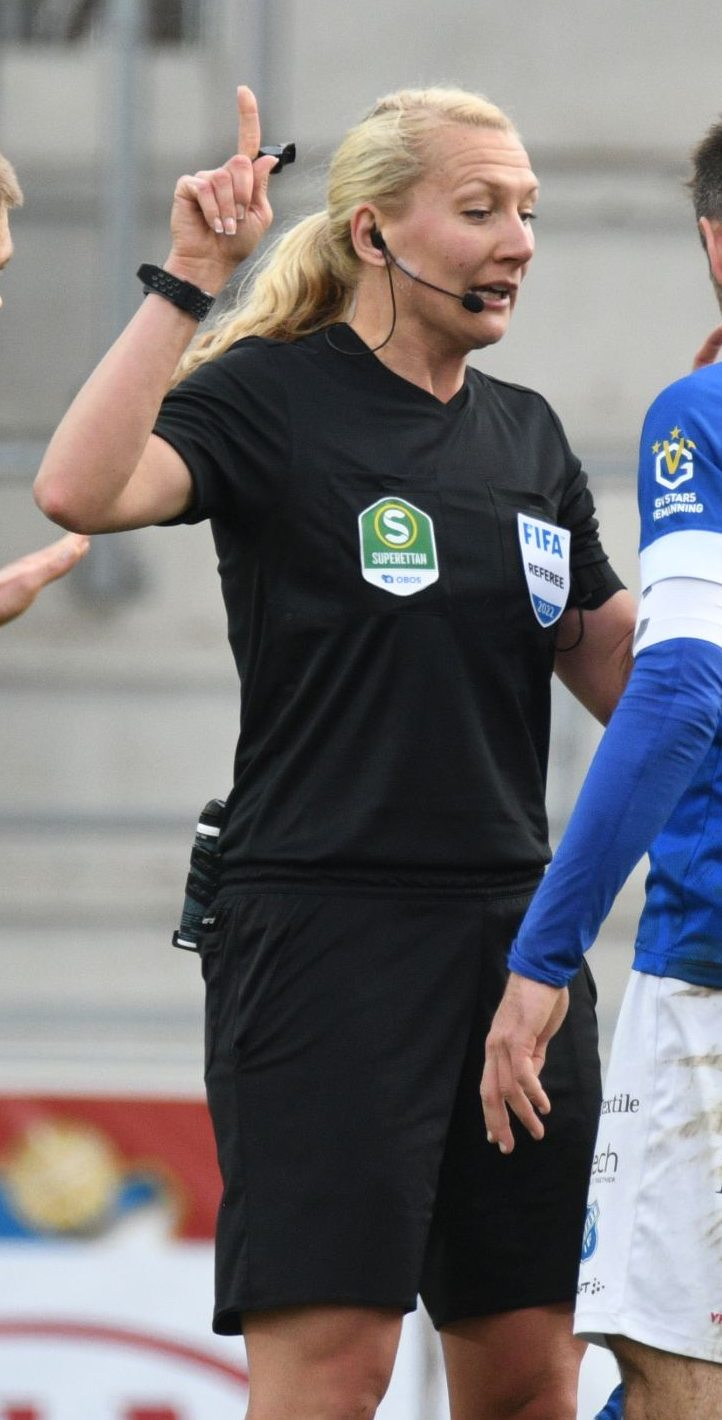
- Olofsson in 2022
- Born: 24 January 1988 (age 38)

Domestic
Years	League	Role
2018–	Svenska Cupen	Referee
2020–	Superettan	Referee
2020–	Women Damallsvenskan	Referee

International
Years	League	Role
2016–	FIFA listed	Referee

Tess Olofsson (born 24 January 1988) is a Swedish international football referee. She has been an international football referee since 2016.

== Career ==
Since 2018, Olofsson has been a referee in the Swedish Svenska Cupen.

Olofsson was appointed to be a referee at the UEFA Women's Euro 2022 in England.

On 9 January 2023, FIFA appointed her to the officiating pool for the 2023 FIFA Women's World Cup in Australia and New Zealand.

In April 2024, she was named to the squad of referees for the 2024 Summer Olympics. Olofsson was assigned the opening round Group A match between Canada and New Zealand, as well as the quarterfinal match between the United States and Japan. Olofsson was also eventually selected to officiate the Gold Medal match between the United States and Brazil.

On 11 May 2026, UEFA announced Olofsson would take charge of 2026 UEFA Women's Champions League final between Barcelona and Lyon on 23 May.
