= 2015 FIFA Women's World Cup Group E =

Football tournament group stage

Group E of the 2015 FIFA Women's World Cup consisted of Brazil, South Korea, Spain and Costa Rica. Matches were played from 9 to 17 June 2015.

== Teams ==
Draw position	Team	Confederation	Method of qualification	Date of qualification	Finals appearance	Last appearance	Previous best performance	FIFA Rankings at start of event
E1 (seed)	Brazil	CONMEBOL	Copa América Femenina winners	26 September 2014	7th	2011	Runners-up (2007)	7
E2	South Korea	AFC	AFC Women's Asian Cup 4th place	17 May 2014	2nd	2003	Group stage (2003)	18
E3	Spain	UEFA	UEFA Group 2 winners	13 September 2014	1st	—	—	14
E4	Costa Rica	CONCACAF	CONCACAF Women's Championship runners-up	24 October 2014	1st	—	—	37

== Standings ==
Pos	Team	Pld	W	D	L	GF	GA	GD	Pts	Qualification
1	Brazil	3	3	0	0	4	0	+4	9	Advance to knockout stage
2	South Korea	3	1	1	1	4	5	−1	4	Advance to knockout stage
3	Costa Rica	3	0	2	1	3	4	−1	2	
4	Spain	3	0	1	2	2	4	−2	1	

Source: FIFA
Rules for classification: Group stage tiebreakers

In the round of 16:

- Brazil advanced to play Australia (runner-up of Group D).
- South Korea advanced to play France (winner of Group F).

== Matches ==
=== Spain vs Costa Rica ===
9 June 2015
16:00 EDT (UTC−4)

Spain	1–1	Costa Rica
Losada 13'	Report	R. Rodríguez 14'

Olympic Stadium, Montreal
Attendance: 10,175
Referee: Salomé di Iorio (Argentina)

Spain	Costa Rica

GK	1	Ainhoa Tirapu
RB	2	Celia Jiménez	(yellow card) 44'	(substituted off) 62'
CB	18	Marta Torrejón
CB	20	Irene Paredes
LB	3	Leire Landa
CM	14	Vicky Losada
CM	21	Alexia Putellas
RW	7	Natalia Pablos
AM	9	Verónica Boquete (c)
LW	8	Sonia Bermúdez		(substituted off) 72'
CF	10	Jennifer Hermoso		(substituted off) 84'
Substitutions:
DF	5	Ruth García		(substituted on) 62'
MF	12	Marta Corredera		(substituted on) 72'
FW	11	Priscila Borja		(substituted on) 84'
Manager:
Ignacio Quereda

GK	1	Dinnia Díaz
RB	5	Diana Sáenz
CB	6	Carol Sánchez
CB	20	Wendy Acosta
LB	12	Lixy Rodríguez
DM	16	Katherine Alvarado
CM	10	Shirley Cruz Traña (c)
CM	11	Raquel Rodríguez
RW	7	Melissa Herrera	(substituted off) 88'
LW	14	María Barrantes	(substituted off) 74'
CF	9	Carolina Venegas	(substituted off) 80'
Substitutions:
FW	17	Karla Villalobos	(substituted on) 74'
MF	15	Cristín Granados	(substituted on) 80'
DF	2	Gabriela Guillén	(substituted on) 88'
Manager:
Amelia Valverde

Player of the Match:
Raquel Rodríguez (Costa Rica)

Assistant referees:
Maria Rocco (Argentina)
Mariana de Almeida (Argentina)
Fourth official:
Olga Miranda (Paraguay)
Fifth official:
Allyson Flynn (Australia)

=== Brazil vs South Korea ===
9 June 2015
19:00 EDT (UTC−4)

Brazil	2–0	South Korea
Formiga 33'; Marta 53' (pen.)	Report

Olympic Stadium, Montreal
Attendance: 10,175
Referee: Esther Staubli (Switzerland)

Brazil	South Korea

GK	1	Luciana
RB	2	Fabiana
CB	3	Mônica Alves
CB	16	Rafaelle Souza	(substituted off) 82'
LB	6	Tamires
CM	20	Formiga
CM	8	Thaísa Moreno
AM	5	Andressinha	(substituted off) 81'
RF	10	Marta (c)
CF	11	Cristiane
LF	9	Andressa Alves	(substituted off) 90+1'
Substitutions:
MF	18	Raquel Fernandes	(substituted on) 81'
DF	14	Géssica do Nascimento	(substituted on) 82'
FW	4	Rafinha Travalão	(substituted on) 90+1'
Manager:
Vadão

GK	18	Kim Jung-mi
RB	20	Kim Hye-ri
CB	5	Kim Do-yeon
CB	4	Shim Seo-yeon
LB	2	Lee Eun-mi
CM	13	Kwon Hah-nul		(substituted off) 77'
CM	8	Cho So-hyun (c)	(yellow card) 52'
RW	16	Kang Yu-mi		(substituted off) 90+1'
AM	10	Ji So-yun
LW	7	Jeon Ga-eul
CF	12	Yoo Young-a		(substituted off) 67'
Substitutions:
FW	11	Jung Seol-bin		(substituted on) 67'
MF	22	Lee So-dam		(substituted on) 77'
MF	15	Park Hee-young		(substituted on) 90+1'
Manager:
Yoon Deok-yeo

Player of the Match:
Formiga (Brazil)

Assistant referees:
Ella de Vries (Belgium)
Lucie Ratajová (Czech Republic)
Fourth official:
Carina Vitulano (Italy)
Fifth official:
Tonja Paavola (Finland)

=== Brazil vs Spain ===
13 June 2015
16:00 EDT (UTC−4)

Brazil	1–0	Spain
Andressa Alves 44'	Report

Olympic Stadium, Montreal
Attendance: 28,623
Referee: Carol Anne Chenard (Canada)

Brazil	Spain

GK	1	Luciana
RB	2	Fabiana		(substituted off) 77'
CB	3	Mônica Alves
CB	16	Rafaelle Souza
LB	6	Tamires
CM	8	Thaísa Moreno		(substituted off) 60'
CM	5	Andressinha
AM	20	Formiga
RF	10	Marta (c)
CF	11	Cristiane		(substituted off) 89'
LF	9	Andressa Alves
Substitutions:
FW	22	Darlene		(substituted on) 60'
DF	13	Poliana		(substituted on) 77'
FW	18	Raquel Fernandes	(yellow card) 90+2'	(substituted on) 89'
Manager:
Vadão

GK	1	Ainhoa Tirapu
RB	2	Celia Jiménez
CB	18	Marta Torrejón
CB	20	Irene Paredes
LB	3	Leire Landa	(yellow card) 23'
DM	6	Virginia Torrecilla		(substituted off) 77'
CM	14	Vicky Losada
CM	9	Verónica Boquete (c)
RW	12	Marta Corredera		(substituted off) 70'
LW	21	Alexia Putellas
CF	7	Natalia Pablos		(substituted off) 71'
Substitutions:
FW	11	Priscila Borja		(substituted on) 70'
MF	15	Silvia Meseguer		(substituted on) 71'
FW	8	Sonia Bermúdez		(substituted on) 77'
Manager:
Ignacio Quereda

Player of the Match:
Andressa Alves (Brazil)

Assistant referees:
Marie-Josée Charbonneau (Canada)
Suzanne Morisset (Canada)
Fourth official:
Margaret Domka (United States)
Fifth official:
Princess Brown (Jamaica)

=== South Korea vs Costa Rica ===
13 June 2015
19:00 EDT (UTC−4)

South Korea	2–2	Costa Rica
Ji So-yun 21' (pen.); Jeon Ga-eul 25'	Report	Herrera 17'; K. Villalobos 89'

Olympic Stadium, Montreal
Attendance: 28,623
Referee: Carina Vitulano (Italy)

South Korea	Costa Rica

GK	18	Kim Jung-mi
RB	20	Kim Hye-ri	(yellow card) 69'	(substituted off) 84'
CB	6	Hwang Bo-ram	(yellow card) 86'
CB	4	Shim Seo-yeon
LB	2	Lee Eun-mi
CM	13	Kwon Hah-nul
CM	8	Cho So-hyun (c)
RW	16	Kang Yu-mi		(substituted off) 63'
AM	10	Ji So-yun
LW	7	Jeon Ga-eul
CF	12	Yoo Young-a		(substituted off) 77'
Substitutions:
FW	11	Jung Seol-bin		(substituted on) 63'
FW	23	Lee Geum-min	(yellow card) 81'	(substituted on) 77'
DF	3	Lim Seon-joo		(substituted on) 84'
Manager:
Yoon Deok-yeo

GK	1	Dinnia Díaz
RB	5	Diana Sáenz
CB	6	Carol Sánchez
CB	20	Wendy Acosta
LB	12	Lixy Rodríguez
DM	16	Katherine Alvarado
CM	10	Shirley Cruz Traña (c)
CM	11	Raquel Rodríguez
RW	7	Melissa Herrera
LW	14	María Barrantes	(substituted off) 76'
CF	15	Cristín Granados
Substitutions:
FW	17	Karla Villalobos	(substituted on) 76'
Manager:
Amelia Valverde

Player of the Match:
Cristín Granados (Costa Rica)

Assistant referees:
Michelle O'Neill (Republic of Ireland)
Tonja Paavola (Finland)
Fourth official:
Olga Miranda (Paraguay)
Fifth official:
Chrysoula Kourompylia (Greece)

=== Costa Rica vs Brazil ===
17 June 2015
20:00 ADT (UTC−3)

Costa Rica	0–1	Brazil
	Report	Raquel 83'

Moncton Stadium, Moncton
Attendance: 9,543
Referee: Efthalia Mitsi (Greece)

Costa Rica	Brazil

GK	1	Dinnia Díaz
RB	5	Diana Sáenz
CB	6	Carol Sánchez
CB	20	Wendy Acosta
LB	12	Lixy Rodríguez
DM	16	Katherine Alvarado	(substituted off) 86'
RM	7	Melissa Herrera
CM	10	Shirley Cruz Traña (c)
CM	11	Raquel Rodríguez
LM	14	María Barrantes	(substituted off) 72'
CF	15	Cristín Granados	(substituted off) 57'
Substitutions:
FW	9	Adriana Venegas	(substituted on) 57'
FW	17	Karla Villalobos	(substituted on) 72'
DF	19	Fabiola Sánchez	(substituted on) 86'
Manager:
Amelia Valverde

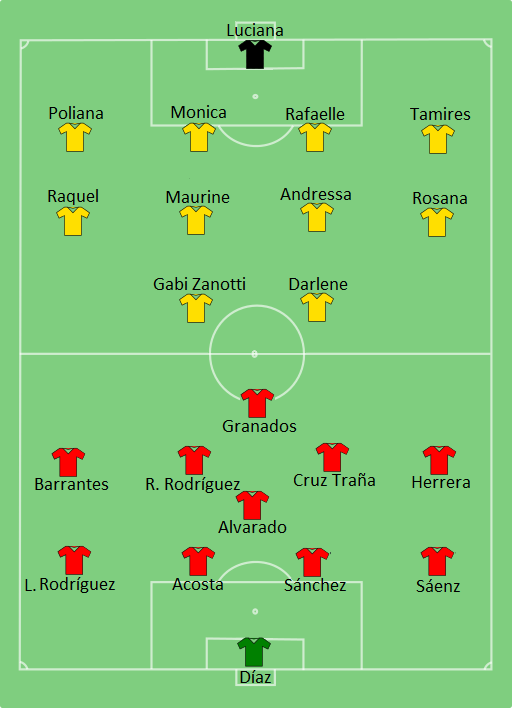

GK	1	Luciana
RB	13	Poliana
CB	3	Mônica Alves	(substituted off) 66'
CB	16	Rafaelle Souza
LB	6	Tamires
CM	19	Maurine (c)
CM	5	Andressinha
RW	18	Raquel Fernandes
LW	17	Rosana
CF	21	Gabi Zanotti	(substituted off) 78'
CF	22	Darlene	(substituted off) 59'
Substitutions:
FW	7	Bia Zaneratto	(substituted on) 59'
DF	14	Géssica do Nascimento	(substituted on) 66'
FW	4	Rafinha Travalão	(substituted on) 78'
Manager:
Vadão

Player of the Match:
Andressa (Brazil)

Assistant referees:
Chrysoula Kourompylia (Greece)
Angela Kyriakou (Cyprus)
Fourth official:
Olga Miranda (Paraguay)
Fifth official:
Souad Oulhaj (Morocco)

=== South Korea vs Spain ===
17 June 2015
19:00 EDT (UTC−4)

South Korea	2–1	Spain
Cho So-hyun 53'; Kim Soo-yun 78'	Report	Boquete 29'

TD Place Stadium, Ottawa
Attendance: 21,562
Referee: Anna-Marie Keighley (New Zealand)

South Korea	Spain

GK	18	Kim Jung-mi
RB	20	Kim Hye-ri		(substituted off) 46'
CB	4	Shim Seo-yeon
CB	6	Hwang Bo-ram	(yellow card) 69'
LB	2	Lee Eun-mi
CM	13	Kwon Hah-nul
CM	8	Cho So-hyun (c)
RW	16	Kang Yu-mi		(substituted off) 77'
AM	10	Ji So-yun
LW	7	Jeon Ga-eul
CF	9	Park Eun-sun		(substituted off) 59'
Substitutions:
DF	19	Kim Soo-yun		(substituted on) 46'
FW	12	Yoo Young-a		(substituted on) 59'
MF	15	Park Hee-young		(substituted on) 77'
Manager:
Yoon Deok-yeo

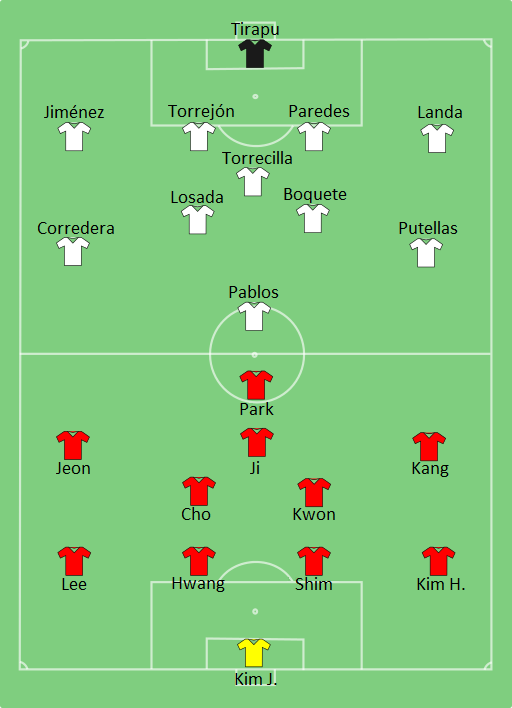

GK	1	Ainhoa Tirapu
RB	2	Celia Jiménez
CB	18	Marta Torrejón
CB	20	Irene Paredes
LB	3	Leire Landa
DM	6	Virginia Torrecilla	(yellow card) 56'
CM	14	Vicky Losada		(substituted off) 57'
CM	9	Verónica Boquete (c)
RW	12	Marta Corredera		(substituted off) 75'
LW	21	Alexia Putellas
CF	7	Natalia Pablos		(substituted off) 63'
Substitutions:
MF	15	Silvia Meseguer		(substituted on) 57'
FW	8	Sonia Bermúdez		(substituted on) 63'
FW	19	Erika Vázquez		(substituted on) 75'
Manager:
Ignacio Quereda

Player of the Match:
Ji So-yun (South Korea)

Assistant referees:
Sarah Walker (New Zealand)
Allyson Flynn (Australia)
Fourth official:
Margaret Domka (United States)
Fifth official:
Cui Yongmei (China)

== See also ==
- Brazil at the FIFA Women's World Cup
- Costa Rica at the FIFA Women's World Cup
- South Korea at the FIFA Women's World Cup
- Spain at the FIFA Women's World Cup
