= 2015 in South Korean football =

Football in South Korea
- Season: 2015

Men's football
- K League Classic: Jeonbuk Hyundai Motors
- K League Challenge: Sangju Sangmu
- National League: Hyundai Mipo Dockyard
- K3 League: Pocheon Citizen
- Korean FA Cup: FC Seoul

Women's football
- WK League: Incheon Hyundai Steel Red Angels

This article shows a summary of the 2015 football season in South Korea.

== National teams ==
=== AFC Asian Cup ===
Under the leadership of manager Uli Stielike, the South Korean players underperformed in the first two matches against Oman and Kuwait. They won both matches, but expressed dissatisfaction with Stielike, who then handed over command to assistant manager Shin Tae-yong for the rest of the tournament. Goalkeeper Kim Jin-hyeon then kept a clean sheet in every match until the final, as the team eliminated Uzbekistan and Iraq in the quarter-finals and semi-finals, respectively. Their opponent in the final was Australia, which they had already beaten 1–0 in the group stage. However, South Korea lost the final 2–1 after extra time, evoking the 1980 final between them and Kuwait.

10 January Group A	South Korea	1–0	Oman	Canberra, Australia
16:00 UTC+11	Cho Young-cheol 45+2'	Report		Stadium: Canberra Stadium; Attendance: 12,552; Referee: Peter O'Leary (New Zealand)

13 January Group A	Kuwait	0–1	South Korea	Canberra, Australia
18:00 UTC+11		Report	Nam Tae-hee 36'	Stadium: Canberra Stadium; Attendance: 8,795; Referee: Alireza Faghani (Iran)

17 January Group A	Australia	0–1	South Korea	Brisbane, Australia
19:00 UTC+11		Report	Lee Jung-hyup 33'	Stadium: Suncorp Stadium; Attendance: 48,513; Referee: Nawaf Shukralla (Bahrain)

Group A table
Pos	Team	Pld	W	D	L	GF	GA	GD	Pts	Qualification
1	South Korea	3	3	0	0	3	0	+3	9	Advance to knockout stage
2	Australia (H)	3	2	0	1	8	2	+6	6	Advance to knockout stage
3	Oman	3	1	0	2	1	5	−4	3	
4	Kuwait	3	0	0	3	1	6	−5	0	

22 January Quarter-finals	South Korea	2–0 (a.e.t.)	Uzbekistan	Melbourne, Australia
18:30 UTC+11	Son Heung-min 104', 119'	Report		Stadium: Melbourne Rectangular Stadium; Attendance: 23,381; Referee: Fahad Al-Mirdasi (Saudi Arabia)

26 January Semi-finals	South Korea	2–0	Iraq	Sydney, Australia
20:00 UTC+11	Lee Jung-hyup 20'; Kim Young-gwon 50'	Report		Stadium: Stadium Australia; Attendance: 36,053; Referee: Ryuji Sato (Japan)

31 January Final	South Korea	1–2 (a.e.t.)	Australia	Sydney, Australia
20:00 (UTC+11)	Son Heung-min 90+1'	Report	Luongo 45'; Troisi 105'	Stadium: Stadium Australia; Attendance: 76,385; Referee: Alireza Faghani (Iran)

=== FIFA World Cup qualification ===
16 June AFC second round, Group G	South Korea	2–0	Myanmar	Bangkok, Thailand
19:00	Lee Jae-sung 35'; Son Heung-min 67'	Report (FIFA); Report (AFC)		Stadium: Rajamangala Stadium; Attendance: 1,090; Referee: Ahmed Al-Kaf (Oman)

3 September AFC second round, Group G	South Korea	8–0	Laos	Hwaseong, South Korea
20:00 UTC+9	Lee Chung-yong 9'; Son Heung-min 12', 74', 89'; Kwon Chang-hoon 30', 75'; Suk Hyun-jun 58'; Lee Jae-sung 90+4'	Report (FIFA); Report (AFC)		Stadium: Hwaseong Stadium; Attendance: 30,205; Referee: Jumpei Iida (Japan)

8 September AFC second round, Group G	Lebanon	0–3	South Korea	Sidon, Lebanon
17:00 UTC+3		Report (FIFA); Report (AFC)	Jang Hyun-soo 22' (pen.); Ali Hamam 26' (o.g.); Kwon Chang-hoon 60'	Stadium: Saida Municipal Stadium; Attendance: 5,500; Referee: Dmitriy Mashentsev (Kyrgyzstan)

8 October AFC second round, Group G	Kuwait	0–1	South Korea	Kuwait City, Kuwait
17:50 UTC+3		Report (FIFA); Report (AFC)	Koo Ja-cheol 12'	Stadium: Al Kuwait Sports Club Stadium; Attendance: 12,350; Referee: Alireza Faghani (Iran)

12 November AFC second round, Group G	South Korea	4–0	Myanmar	Suwon, South Korea
20:00 UTC+9	Lee Jae-sung 18'; Koo Ja-cheol 30'; Jang Hyun-soo 82'; Nam Tae-hee 86'	Report (FIFA); Report (AFC)		Stadium: Suwon World Cup Stadium; Attendance: 24,270; Referee: Khamis Al-Marri (Qatar)

17 November AFC second round, Group G	Laos	0–5	South Korea	Vientiane, Laos
19:00 UTC+7		Report (FIFA); Report (AFC)	Ki Sung-yueng 3' (pen.), 33'; Son Heung-min 35', 67'; Suk Hyun-jun 43'	Stadium: New Laos National Stadium; Attendance: 3,000; Referee: Turki Al-Khudhayr (Saudi Arabia)

=== EAFF Championship ===
2 August	China	0–2	South Korea	Wuhan, China
21:00 UTC+8		Report	Kim Seung-dae 45'; Lee Jong-ho 57'	Stadium: Wuhan Sports Center Stadium; Attendance: ? Referee: Fahad Al-Mirdasi (Saudi Arabia)

5 August	South Korea	1–1	Japan	Wuhan, China
18:20 UTC+8	Jang Hyun-soo 26' (pen.)	Report	Yamaguchi 39'	Stadium: Wuhan Sports Center Stadium; Attendance: ? Referee: Muhammad Taqi Aljaafari (Singapore)

9 August	South Korea	0–0	North Korea	Wuhan, China
17:10 UTC+8		Report		Stadium: Wuhan Sports Center Stadium; Attendance: ? Referee: Alireza Faghani (Iran)

Pos	Team	Pld	W	D	L	GF	GA	GD	Pts
1	South Korea (C)	3	1	2	0	3	1	+2	5
2	China (H)	3	1	1	1	3	3	0	4
3	North Korea	3	1	1	1	2	3	−1	4
4	Japan	3	0	2	1	3	4	−1	2

Source: EAFF
(C) Champions; (H) Hosts

=== AFC U-23 Championship qualification ===
27 March Group H	South Korea	5–0	Brunei	Central Jakarta, Indonesia
17:30 WIB (UTC+07)	Lee Yeong-jae 3'; Jung Seung-hyun 29'; Kim Hyun 39' (pen.); Kwon Chang-hoon 57' (pen.); Jang Hyun-soo 76'	Report		Stadium: Gelora Bung Karno Stadium, Central Jakarta; Attendance: 600; Referee: Jumpei Iida (JPN)

29 March Group H	Timor-Leste	0–3	South Korea	Central Jakarta, Indonesia
19:00 WIB (UTC+07)		Report	Moon Chang-jin 17' (pen.), 47', 74'; Kim Seung-jun 44'	Stadium: Gelora Bung Karno Stadium, Central Jakarta; Attendance: 555; Referee: Sivakorn Pu-Udom (THA)

31 March Group H	South Korea	4–0	Indonesia	Central Jakarta, Indonesia
15:30 WIB (UTC+07)	Jung Seung-hyun 52'; Lee Chan-dong 71'; Kim Seung-jun 83'; Lee Chang-min 87'	Report		Stadium: Gelora Bung Karno Stadium, Central Jakarta; Attendance: 16,422; Referee: Mohammed Abdulla Hassan Mohamed (UAE)

Group H table
Pos	Team	Pld	W	D	L	GF	GA	GD	Pts	Qualification
1	South Korea	3	3	0	0	12	0	+12	9	Qualification for AFC U-23 Championship
2	Indonesia (H)	3	2	0	1	7	4	+3	6	
3	Timor-Leste	3	1	0	2	3	8	−5	3	
4	Brunei	3	0	0	3	0	10	−10	0	

Source: AFC
Rules for classification: Tiebreakers
(H) Hosts

=== FIFA Women's World Cup ===
South Korea finished in fourth place at the 2014 AFC Women's Asian Cup and qualified for the 2015 FIFA Women's World Cup, where they made it out of the group stage for the first time. They were drawn in Group E with Brazil, Spain and Costa Rica. South Korea lost 2–0 to Brazil, but a 2–2 draw with Costa Rica and a 2–1 victory against Spain were enough for them to progress for the first time ever at a World Cup. They went on to lose 3–0 to France in the round of 16.

9 June Group E	Brazil	2–0	South Korea	Montreal, Canada
19:00 EDT (UTC−4)	Formiga 33'; Marta 53' (pen.)	Report		Stadium: Olympic Stadium; Attendance: 10,175; Referee: Esther Staubli (Switzerland)

13 June Group E	South Korea	2–2	Costa Rica	Montreal, Canada
19:00 EDT (UTC−4)	Ji So-yun 21' (pen.); Jeon Ga-eul 25'	Report	Herrera 17'; K. Villalobos 89'	Stadium: Olympic Stadium; Attendance: 28,623; Referee: Carina Vitulano (Italy)

17 June Group E	South Korea	2–1	Spain	Ottawa, Canada
19:00 EDT (UTC−4)	Cho So-hyun 53'; Kim Soo-yun 78'	Report	Boquete 29'	Stadium: TD Place Stadium; Attendance: 21,562; Referee: Anna-Marie Keighley (New Zealand)

Group E table
Pos	Team	Pld	W	D	L	GF	GA	GD	Pts	Qualification
1	Brazil	3	3	0	0	4	0	+4	9	Advance to knockout stage
2	South Korea	3	1	1	1	4	5	−1	4	Advance to knockout stage
3	Costa Rica	3	0	2	1	3	4	−1	2	
4	Spain	3	0	1	2	2	4	−2	1	

21 June Round of 16	France	3–0	South Korea	Montreal, Canada
16:00 EDT (UTC−4)	Delie 4', 48'; Thomis 8'	Report		Stadium: Olympic Stadium; Attendance: 15,518; Referee: Salomé di Iorio (Argentina)

=== Friendlies ===
==== Senior team ====
4 January	South Korea	2–0 (Note: The friendly match against Saudi Arabia was not regarded as the official match organized by FIFA because FIFA received the pre-exhibition match document from the Australian Football Association late.)	Saudi Arabia	Sydney, Australia
20:00	Hawsawi 67' (o.g.); Lee Jeong-hyeop 90+2'	Report		Stadium: Parramatta Stadium; Attendance: 6,320; Referee: Jarred Gillett (Australia)

27 March	South Korea	1–1	Uzbekistan	Daejeon, South Korea
20:00	Koo Ja-cheol 15'	Report	Zokhir Kuziboyev 31'	Stadium: Daejeon World Cup Stadium; Attendance: 38,680; Referee: Ryuji Sato (Japan)

31 March	South Korea	1–0	New Zealand	Seoul, South Korea
20:00	Lee Jae-sung 86'	Report		Stadium: Seoul World Cup Stadium; Attendance: 33,514; Referee: Mohd Amirul Izwan Bin Yaacob (Malaysia)

11 June	South Korea	3–0	United Arab Emirates	Kuala Lumpur, Malaysia
20:00	Yeom Ki-hun 45'; Lee Yong-jae 60'; Lee Jeong-hyeop 90'	Report		Stadium: Shah Alam Stadium; Attendance: 1,080; Referee: Võ Minh Trí (Vietnam)

13 October	South Korea	3–0	Jamaica	Seoul, South Korea
20:00 UTC+9	Ji Dong-won 35'; Ki Sung-yueng 55' (pen.); Hwang Ui-jo 63'	Report		Stadium: Seoul World Cup Stadium; Attendance: 28,105; Referee: Ryuji Sato (Japan)

==== Under-23 team ====
1 February	South Korea	1–0	Uzbekistan	Nakhon Ratchasima, Thailand
16:00 TST (UTC+07)	Song Ju-hun 23'			Stadium: 80th Birthday Stadium, Nakhon Ratchasima; Attendance: 3,000; Referee: Sivakorn Pu-Udom (THA)

4 February	Honduras U20	0–2	South Korea	Nakhon Ratchasima, Thailand
16:00 TST (UTC+07)			Lee Chang-min 26'; Lee Woo-hyeok 83'	Stadium: 80th Birthday Stadium, Nakhon Ratchasima; Attendance: 1,000; Referee: Alongkorn Feemuechang (THA)

7 February	Thailand A	0–0	South Korea	Nakhon Ratchasima, Thailand
19:00 TST (UTC+07)				Stadium: 80th Birthday Stadium, Nakhon Ratchasima; Attendance: 20,000; Referee: Phung Dinh Dung (VIE)

9 May	Vietnam	0–0	South Korea	Hanoi, Vietnam
19:00 VST (UTC+07)		Report		Stadium: Mỹ Đình National Stadium; Referee: Suhaizi Shukri (Malaysia)

13 May	Cambodia	0–1	South Korea	Ho Chi Minh City, Vietnam
15:00 VST (UTC+07)		Report	Lee Yeong-jae 50'	Stadium: Thống Nhất Stadium

11 June	France	1–1	South Korea	Gueugnon, France
21:00 CEST (UTC+02)	Haller 29'	Report	Moon Chang-jin 62'	Stadium: Stade Jean Laville; Attendance: 8,000; Referee: Padraigh Sutton (Republic of Ireland)

14 June	Tunisia	0–2	South Korea	Tunis, Tunisia
18:00 CET (UTC+01)		Report	Moon Chang-jin 37'; Saidani 60' (o.g.)	Stadium: Stade El Menzah; Attendance: 200

9 October	South Korea	2–0	Australia	Hwaseong, South Korea
17:10 KST (UTC+09)	Ji Eon-hak 8'; Yeon Jei-min 27'	Report		Stadium: Hwaseong Stadium; Attendance: 8,561; Referee: Võ Minh Trí (Vietnam)

12 October	South Korea	2–1	Australia	Icheon, South Korea
19:00 KST (UTC+09)	Ryu Seung-woo 49'; Lennox 82' (o.g.)	Report	Hoole 88'	Stadium: Icheon City Stadium; Attendance: 19,100; Referee: Sivakorn Pu-Udom (Thailand)

11 November	Morocco	1–0	South Korea	Wuhan, China
16:00 CST (UTC+08)	Achahbar 28'	Report		Stadium: Wuhan Sports Center Stadium, Wuhan; Referee: Zhou Gang (China)

13 November	Colombia	2–2	South Korea	Wuhan, China
16:00 CST (UTC+08)	Nieto 68'; Martínez 81'	Report	Ji Eon-hak 17'; Park Yong-woo 37'	Stadium: Wuhan Sports Center Stadium, Wuhan; Referee: Fan Qi (China)

15 November	China	1–1	South Korea	Wuhan, China
19:30 CST (UTC+08)	Mi Haolun 85'	Report	Park Yong-woo 76'	Stadium: Wuhan Sports Center Stadium, Wuhan; Referee: Võ Minh Trí (Vietnam)

== Leagues ==
=== K League Classic ===
Pos	Team	Pld	W	D	L	GF	GA	GD	Pts	Qualification or relegation
1	Jeonbuk Hyundai Motors (C)	38	22	7	9	57	39	+18	73	Qualification for Champions League group stage
2	Suwon Samsung Bluewings	38	19	10	9	60	43	+17	67	Qualification for Champions League group stage
3	Pohang Steelers	38	18	12	8	49	32	+17	66	Qualification for Champions League playoff round
4	FC Seoul	38	17	11	10	52	44	+8	62	Qualification for Champions League group stage (Note: Qualified as champions of FA Cup.)
5	Seongnam FC	38	15	15	8	41	33	+8	60	
6	Jeju United	38	14	8	16	55	56	−1	50	
7	Ulsan Hyundai	38	13	14	11	54	45	+9	53	
8	Incheon United	38	13	12	13	35	32	+3	51	
9	Jeonnam Dragons	38	12	13	13	46	51	−5	49	
10	Gwangju FC	38	10	12	16	35	44	−9	42	
11	Busan IPark (R)	38	5	11	22	30	55	−25	26	Qualification for relegation playoffs
12	Daejeon Citizen (R)	38	4	7	27	32	72	−40	19	Relegation to K League Challenge

Source: K League
Rules for classification: 1) Points; 2) Goal difference; 3) Goals scored; 4) Wins
(C) Champions; (R) Relegated

=== K League Challenge ===
==== Regular season ====
Pos	Team	Pld	W	D	L	GF	GA	GD	Pts	Qualification
1	Sangju Sangmu (C, P)	40	20	7	13	77	57	+20	67	Promotion to K League Classic
2	Daegu FC	40	18	13	9	67	47	+20	67	Qualification for promotion playoffs semi-final
3	Suwon FC (O, P)	40	18	11	11	64	54	+10	65	Qualification for promotion playoffs first round
4	Seoul E-Land	40	16	13	11	69	58	+11	61	Qualification for promotion playoffs first round
5	Bucheon FC 1995	40	15	10	15	43	45	−2	55	
6	FC Anyang	40	13	15	12	53	52	+1	54	
7	Gangwon FC	40	13	12	15	64	56	+8	51	
8	Goyang Hi FC	40	13	10	17	46	68	−22	49	
9	Gyeongnam FC	40	10	13	17	30	43	−13	43	
10	Ansan Police	40	9	15	16	31	48	−17	42	
11	Chungju Hummel	40	10	11	19	49	65	−16	41	

Source: K League
Rules for classification: 1) Points; 2) Goal difference; 3) Goals scored
(C) Champions; (O) Play-off winners; (P) Promoted

==== Promotion playoffs ====
When the first round and semi-final match were finished as draws, their winners were decided on the regular season rankings without extra time and the penalty shoot-out. Suwon FC was promoted to the K League Classic, while Busan IPark was relegated to the K League Challenge.

First round
3	Suwon FC	3
4	Seoul E-Land	3

Semi-final
2	Daegu FC	1
3	Suwon FC	2

Final
Suwon FC	1	2	3
Busan IPark	0	0	0

=== Korea National League ===
==== Regular season ====
Pos	Team	Pld	W	D	L	GF	GA	GD	Pts	Qualification or relegation
1	Hyundai Mipo Dockyard (C)	27	13	11	3	47	24	+23	50	Qualification for playoffs final
2	Changwon City	27	13	7	7	37	33	+4	46	Qualification for playoffs semi-final
3	Gyeongju KHNP	27	12	9	6	39	27	+12	45	Qualification for playoffs first round
4	Mokpo City	27	12	8	7	30	21	+9	44	Qualification for playoffs first round
5	Daejeon Korail	27	8	9	10	36	27	+9	33	
6	Yongin City	27	8	9	10	25	29	−4	33	
7	Gimhae City	27	6	11	10	29	39	−10	29	
8	Cheonan City	27	6	10	11	27	39	−12	28	
9	Gangneung City	27	5	12	10	20	29	−9	27	
10	Busan Transportation Corporation	27	5	8	14	24	46	−22	23	

Source: Korea National League
Rules for classification: 1) Points; 2) Goal difference; 3) Goals scored
(C) Champions

==== Championship playoffs ====
First round
3	Gyeongju KHNP	2
4	Mokpo City	0

Semi-final
2	Changwon City	0 (5)
Gyeongju KHNP (p)	0 (6)

Final
Gyeongju KHNP	0	0	0
1	Hyundai Mipo Dockyard	1	1	2

=== K3 League ===
==== Group A ====
Pos	Team	Pld	W	D*	LP	L	GF	GA	GD	Pts	Qualification
1	Pocheon Citizen (C)	25	22	2	1	0	104	17	+87	68.5	Qualification for playoffs final
2	Gyeongju Citizen	25	16	2	1	6	73	28	+45	50.5	Qualification for playoffs first round
3	Paju Citizen	25	15	3	1	6	56	22	+34	48.5	Qualification for playoffs first round
4	Icheon Citizen	25	14	4	0	7	58	23	+35	46	
5	Cheonan FC	25	9	5	0	11	61	43	+18	32	
6	Jeonju FC	25	8	1	2	14	43	54	−11	26	
7	Pyeongchang FC	25	8	0	2	15	37	47	−10	25	
8	Uijeongbu	25	7	1	0	17	46	62	−16	22	
9	Seoul FC Martyrs	25	0	0	0	25	9	284	−275	−3	

Source: JoinKFA Soccerway
Rules for classification: 1) Points; 2) Goal difference; 3) Goals scored
(C) Champion

==== Group B ====
Pos	Team	Pld	W	D*	LP	L	GF	GA	GD	Pts	Qualification
1	Gimpo Citizen	25	17	5	0	3	81	22	+59	56	Qualification for playoffs semi-final
2	Hwaseong FC	25	18	2	0	5	65	36	+29	56	Qualification for playoffs first round
3	Yangju Citizen	25	12	5	0	8	65	37	+28	41	Qualification for playoffs first round
4	Jungnang Chorus Mustang	25	12	1	1	11	48	37	+11	37.5	
5	Chuncheon FC	25	11	3	1	10	46	42	+4	36.5	
6	Cheongju FC	25	10	4	0	11	52	51	+1	34	
7	Yeonggwang FC	25	6	4	0	15	37	42	−5	22	
8	Goyang Citizen	25	7	1	0	17	31	57	−26	22	
9	Seoul United	25	5	4	0	16	51	59	−8	19	

Source: JoinKFA Soccerway
Rules for classification: 1) Points; 2) Goal difference; 3) Goals scored

==== Championship playoffs ====
First round
A2	Gyeongju Citizen	3
B3	Yangju Citizen	2
B2	Hwaseong FC	2
A3	Paju Citizen	1

Second round
Hwaseong FC	0 (7)
Gyeongju Citizen (p)	0 (8)

Semifinal
B1	Gimpo Citizen	2 (3)
Gyeongju Citizen (p)	2 (5)

Final
A1	Pocheon Citizen	1
Gyeongju Citizen	0

=== WK League ===
==== Regular season ====
Pos	Team	Pld	W	D	L	GF	GA	GD	Pts	Qualification
1	Incheon Hyundai Steel Red Angels (C)	24	19	4	1	57	16	+41	61	Qualification for playoffs final
2	Icheon Daekyo	24	12	7	5	43	23	+20	43	Qualification for playoffs semi-final
3	Suwon FMC	24	10	7	7	36	30	+6	37	Qualification for playoffs semi-final
4	Hwacheon KSPO	24	8	10	6	34	28	+6	34	
5	Daejeon Sportstoto	24	8	6	10	30	26	+4	30	
6	Seoul WFC	24	3	6	15	28	61	−33	15	
7	Busan Sangmu	24	3	2	19	22	66	−44	11	

Source: RSSSF
(C) Champions

==== Championship playoffs ====
Semi-final			Final
			1	Incheon Hyundai Steel Red Angels (p)	0	1	1 (4)
2	Icheon Daekyo	2		Icheon Daekyo	0	1	1 (3)
3	Suwon FMC	1

== Domestic cups ==
=== Korean FA Cup ===
Round of 32
Suwon Samsung Bluewings	3 (3)
Jeonnam Dragons (p)	3 (4)
Ansan Police	1 (3)
Chungju Hummel (p)	1 (4)
Busan IPark	2
Gangwon FC	3
Hyundai Mipo Dockyard	2
Gimpo Citizen	0
Jeju United	4
FC Anyang	1
Daejeon Korail	1
Yongin City	0
Incheon United	2
Bucheon FC 1995	0
Cheonan City	4
Korea University	1
Seongnam FC (a.e.t.)	1
Busan Transportation Corporation	0
Sangji University	1
Yeungnam University	2
Ulsan Hyundai (p)	1 (6)
Seoul E-Land	1 (5)
Gwangju FC	0
Daejeon Citizen	1
FC Seoul	3
Gyeongju KHNP	0
Changwon City	1
Hwaseong FC	2
Pohang Steelers	3
Daegu FC	1
Jeonbuk Hyundai Motors (a.e.t.)	1
Goyang Hi FC	0

Round of 16
Jeonnam Dragons	4
Chungju Hummel	1
Gangwon FC	0
Hyundai Mipo Dockyard	1
Jeju United	2
Daejeon Korail	1
Incheon United	1
Cheonan City	0
Seongnam FC (a.e.t.)	2
Yeungnam University	1
Ulsan Hyundai (a.e.t.)	3
Daejeon Citizen	2
FC Seoul	2
Hwaseong FC	1
Pohang Steelers	2
Jeonbuk Hyundai Motors	1

Quarter-finals
Jeonnam Dragons	1
Hyundai Mipo Dockyard	0
Jeju United	0
Incheon United (a.e.t.)	2
Seongnam FC	1
Ulsan Hyundai (a.e.t.)	2
FC Seoul	2
Pohang Steelers	1

Semi-finals
14 October – Incheon
Jeonnam Dragons	0
Incheon United (a.e.t.)	2
14 October – Seoul
Ulsan Hyundai	1
FC Seoul	2

Final
31 October – Seoul
Incheon United	1
FC Seoul	3

=== Korea National League Championship ===
==== Group stage ====
Group A
Pos	Team	Pld	Pts
1	Daejeon Korail	4	7
2	Gyeongju KHNP	4	6
3	Mokpo City	4	5
4	Changwon City	4	5
5	Yongin City	4	3

Group B
Pos	Team	Pld	Pts
1	Hyundai Mipo Dockyard	4	10
2	Gimhae City	4	7
3	Cheonan City	4	5
4	Gangneung City	4	4
5	Busan Transportation Corporation	4	1

==== Knockout stage ====
Semifinals
A1	Daejeon Korail	2
B2	Gimhae City	1
B1	Hyundai Mipo Dockyard	3
A2	Gyeongju KHNP	2

Final
Daejeon Korail	2
Hyundai Mipo Dockyard	1

== International cups ==
=== AFC Champions League ===
Team	Result	Round	Aggregate	Score	Venue	Opponent
FC Seoul	Round of 16	Qualifying play-offs	7–0	7–0	—	(Vietnam) Hanoi
FC Seoul	Round of 16	Group H	Runners-up	0–1	Away	(China) Guangzhou Evergrande
FC Seoul	Round of 16	Group H	Runners-up	0–0	Home	(China) Guangzhou Evergrande
FC Seoul	Round of 16	Group H	Runners-up	1–0	Home	(Japan) Kashima Antlers
FC Seoul	Round of 16	Group H	Runners-up	3–2	Away	(Japan) Kashima Antlers
FC Seoul	Round of 16	Group H	Runners-up	0–0	Home	(Australia) Western Sydney Wanderers
FC Seoul	Round of 16	Group H	Runners-up	1–1	Away	(Australia) Western Sydney Wanderers
FC Seoul	Round of 16	Round of 16	3–6	1–3	Home	(Japan) Gamba Osaka
FC Seoul	Round of 16	Round of 16	3–6	2–3	Away	(Japan) Gamba Osaka
Jeonbuk Hyundai Motors	Quarter-finals	Group E	Runners-up	0–0	Home	(Japan) Kashiwa Reysol
Jeonbuk Hyundai Motors	Quarter-finals	Group E	Runners-up	2–3	Away	(Japan) Kashiwa Reysol
Jeonbuk Hyundai Motors	Quarter-finals	Group E	Runners-up	4–1	Away	(China) Shandong Luneng
Jeonbuk Hyundai Motors	Quarter-finals	Group E	Runners-up	4–1	Home	(China) Shandong Luneng
Jeonbuk Hyundai Motors	Quarter-finals	Group E	Runners-up	3–0	Home	(Vietnam) Becamex Binh Duong
Jeonbuk Hyundai Motors	Quarter-finals	Group E	Runners-up	1–1	Away	(Vietnam) Becamex Binh Duong
Jeonbuk Hyundai Motors	Quarter-finals	Round of 16	2–1	1–1	Home	(China) Beijing Guoan
Jeonbuk Hyundai Motors	Quarter-finals	Round of 16	2–1	1–0	Away	(China) Beijing Guoan
Jeonbuk Hyundai Motors	Quarter-finals	Quarter-finals	2–3	0–0	Home	(Japan) Gamba Osaka
Jeonbuk Hyundai Motors	Quarter-finals	Quarter-finals	2–3	2–3	Away	(Japan) Gamba Osaka
Seongnam FC	Round of 16	Group F	Runners-up	1–2	Away	(Thailand) Buriram United
Seongnam FC	Round of 16	Group F	Runners-up	2–1	Home	(Thailand) Buriram United
Seongnam FC	Round of 16	Group F	Runners-up	2–0	Home	(Japan) Gamba Osaka
Seongnam FC	Round of 16	Group F	Runners-up	1–2	Away	(Japan) Gamba Osaka
Seongnam FC	Round of 16	Group F	Runners-up	1–0	Away	(China) Guangzhou R&F
Seongnam FC	Round of 16	Group F	Runners-up	0–0	Home	(China) Guangzhou R&F
Seongnam FC	Round of 16	Round of 16	2–3	2–1	Home	(China) Guangzhou Evergrande
Seongnam FC	Round of 16	Round of 16	2–3	0–2	Away	(China) Guangzhou Evergrande
Suwon Samsung Bluewings	Round of 16	Group G	Runners-up	2–1	Home	(Japan) Urawa Red Diamonds
Suwon Samsung Bluewings	Round of 16	Group G	Runners-up	2–1	Away	(Japan) Urawa Red Diamonds
Suwon Samsung Bluewings	Round of 16	Group G	Runners-up	1–1	Home	(China) Beijing Guoan
Suwon Samsung Bluewings	Round of 16	Group G	Runners-up	0–1	Away	(China) Beijing Guoan
Suwon Samsung Bluewings	Round of 16	Group G	Runners-up	3–1	Home	(Australia) Brisbane Roar
Suwon Samsung Bluewings	Round of 16	Group G	Runners-up	3–3	Away	(Australia) Brisbane Roar
Suwon Samsung Bluewings	Round of 16	Round of 16	4–4 (a)	2–3	Home	(Japan) Kashiwa Reysol
Suwon Samsung Bluewings	Round of 16	Round of 16	4–4 (a)	2–1	Away	(Japan) Kashiwa Reysol

== See also ==
- Football in South Korea
