= Zambia at the FIFA Women's World Cup =

FIFA Women's World Cup

Zambia has qualified for the FIFA Women's World Cup on one occasion, the 2023 FIFA Women's World Cup which was also the country's debut, making the country the first landlocked nation in Africa to qualify for a senior World Cup in either gender. Previously, Zambia has come close to qualifying for the FIFA Women's World Cup, but fell short in two occasions, which occurred in 2014 and 2018.

== FIFA Women's World Cup ==
FIFA Women's World Cup record
Year	Result	Matches	Wins	Draws	Losses	GF	GA
(China) 1991	Did not enter						
(Sweden) 1995	Did not qualify						
(United States) 1999	Did not enter						
(United States) 2003	Did not qualify						
(China) 2007	Did not qualify						
(Germany) 2011	Did not enter						
(Canada) 2015	Did not qualify						
(France) 2019	Did not qualify						
(Australia) (New Zealand) 2023	Group stage	3	1	0	2	3	11
(Brazil) 2027	Did not qualify						
(Costa Rica) (Jamaica) (Mexico) (United States) 2031	To be determined						
(United Kingdom) 2035	To be determined						
Total	1/12	3	1	0	2	3	11

FIFA Women's World Cup history
Year	Round	Date	Opponent	Result	Stadium
(Australia) (New Zealand) 2023	Group stage	22 July	Japan	L 5–0	Waikato Stadium, Hamilton
(Australia) (New Zealand) 2023	Group stage	26 July	Spain	L 5–0	Eden Park, Auckland
(Australia) (New Zealand) 2023	Group stage	31 July	Costa Rica	W 3–1	Waikato Stadium, Hamilton

== Record by opponent ==
FIFA Women's World Cup matches (by team)
Opponent	Pld	W	D	L	GF	GA	GD
Costa Rica	1	1	0	0	3	1	2
Japan	1	0	0	1	0	5	-5
Spain	1	0	0	1	0	5	-5

== World Cup participation ==
=== 2023 FIFA Women's World Cup ===
==== Group C ====
Pos	Team	Pld	W	D	L	GF	GA	GD	Pts	Qualification
1	Japan	3	3	0	0	11	0	+11	9	Advance to knockout stage
2	Spain	3	2	0	1	8	4	+4	6	Advance to knockout stage
3	Zambia	3	1	0	2	3	11	−8	3	
4	Costa Rica	3	0	0	3	1	8	−7	0	

Source: FIFA
Rules for classification: Group stage tiebreakers
22 July 2023
19:00 UTC+12

Zambia	0–5	Japan
	Report	Miyazawa 43', 62'; Mi. Tanaka 55'; Endō 71'; Ueki 90+11' (pen.)

Waikato Stadium, Hamilton
Attendance: 16,111
Referee: Tess Olofsson (Sweden)

26 July 2023
19:30 UTC+12

Spain	5–0	Zambia
Abelleira 9'; Hermoso 13', 70'; Redondo 69', 85'	Report

Eden Park, Auckland
Attendance: 20,983
Referee: Oh Hyeon-jeong (South Korea)

31 July 2023
19:00 UTC+12

Costa Rica	1–3	Zambia
Herrera 47'	Report	Mweemba 3'; B. Banda 31' (pen.); Kundananji 90+3'

Waikato Stadium, Hamilton
Attendance: 8,117
Referee: Bouchra Karboubi (Morocco)

== Goalscorers ==
Player	Goals	2023
Barbra Banda	1	1
Racheal Kundananji	1	1
Lushomo Mweemba	1	1
Total	3	3
