= 2023 FIFA Women's World Cup Group C =

Football tournament teams

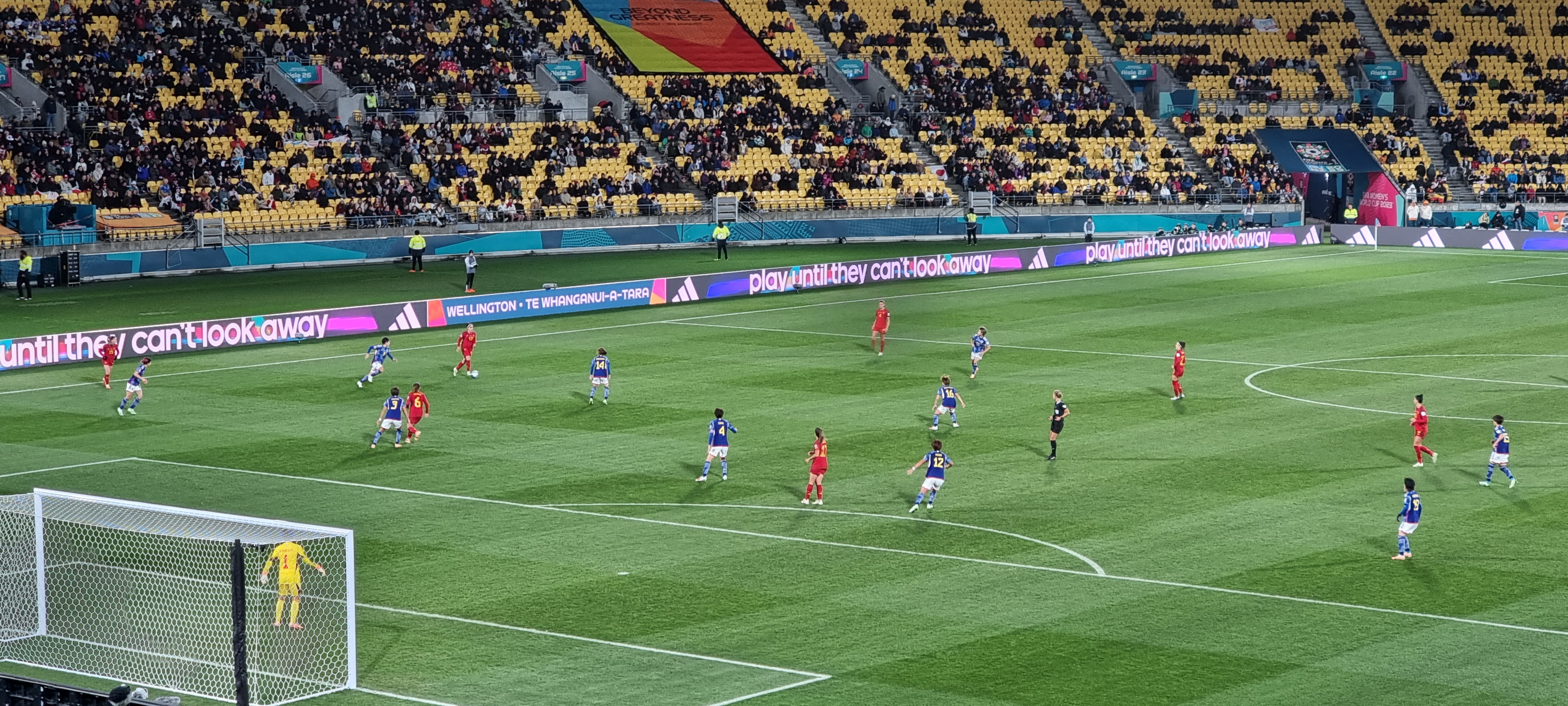
Japan playing against Spain at Wellington Regional Stadium on 31 July 2023.

Group C of the 2023 FIFA Women's World Cup was one of eight groups that formed the opening round of the tournament with the matches played from 21 to 31 July 2023. The group consisted of Spain, Costa Rica, Zambia and Japan. The top two teams, Japan and Spain, advanced to the round of 16.

Japan secured their place in the knockout stage with wins in all three group games without conceding, a first for the country. With six points, Spain earned more points this year than in their previous Women's World Cups combined; a total of five across two editions. Despite being eliminated, debutants Zambia secured their first and only win in their last match against faltering Costa Rica, finishing third in the group.

== Teams ==
Draw position	Team	Pot	Confederation	Method of qualification	Date of qualification	Finals appearance	Last appearance	Previous best performance	FIFA Rankings	
Draw position	Team	Pot	Confederation	Method of qualification	Date of qualification	Finals appearance	Last appearance	Previous best performance	October 2022 (Note: The rankings of October 2022 were used for seeding for the final draw.)	June 2023
C1	Spain	1	UEFA	UEFA Group B winners	12 April 2022	3rd	2019	Round of 16 (2019)	6	6
C2	Costa Rica	3	CONCACAF	2022 CONCACAF W Championship fourth place	8 July 2022	2nd	2015	Group stage (2015)	37	36
C3	Zambia	4	CAF	2022 Women's Africa Cup of Nations third place	13 July 2022	1st	—	Debut	81	77
C4	Japan	2	AFC	2022 AFC Women's Asian Cup semi-finalists	30 January 2022	9th	2019	Winners (2011)	11	11

== Standings ==
Pos	Team	Pld	W	D	L	GF	GA	GD	Pts	Qualification
1	Japan	3	3	0	0	11	0	+11	9	Advance to knockout stage
2	Spain	3	2	0	1	8	4	+4	6	Advance to knockout stage
3	Zambia	3	1	0	2	3	11	−8	3	
4	Costa Rica	3	0	0	3	1	8	−7	0	

Source: FIFA
Rules for classification: Group stage tiebreakers

In the round of 16:

- The winners of Group C, Japan, advanced to play the runners-up of Group A, Norway.
- The runners-up of Group C, Spain, advanced to play the winners of Group A, Switzerland.

== Matches ==
All times listed are local, NZST (UTC+12).

=== Spain vs Costa Rica ===
21 July 2023
19:30

Spain	3–0	Costa Rica
Del Campo 21' (o.g.); Bonmatí 23'; González 27'	Report

Wellington Regional Stadium, Wellington
Attendance: 22,966
Referee: Casey Reibelt (Australia)

Spain	Costa Rica

GK	1	Misa Rodríguez
RB	2	Ona Batlle	(substituted off) 88'
CB	4	Irene Paredes
CB	5	Ivana Andrés (c)
LB	19	Olga Carmona
DM	3	Teresa Abelleira	(substituted off) 77'
CM	6	Aitana Bonmatí
CM	10	Jennifer Hermoso
RF	22	Athenea del Castillo	(substituted off) 63'
CF	9	Esther González	(substituted off) 63'
LF	18	Salma Paralluelo	(substituted off) 77'
Substitutions:
FW	8	Mariona Caldentey	(substituted in) 63'
FW	17	Alba Redondo	(substituted in) 63'
MF	21	Claudia Zornoza	(substituted in) 77'
MF	11	Alexia Putellas	(substituted in) 77'
DF	12	Oihane Hernández	(substituted in) 88'
Manager:
Jorge Vilda

GK	23	Daniela Solera
CB	20	Fabiola Villalobos
CB	4	Mariana Benavides
CB	5	Valeria del Campo
RM	3	María Coto
CM	10	Gloriana Villalobos	(substituted off) 73'
CM	16	Katherine Alvarado (c)
LM	12	María Paula Elizondo	(substituted off) 58'
RF	7	Melissa Herrera
CF	9	María Paula Salas	(substituted off) 73'
LF	14	Priscila Chinchilla
Substitutions:
MF	15	Cristín Granados	(substituted in) 58'
MF	19	Alexandra Pinell	(substituted in) 73'
MF	21	Sheika Scott	(substituted in) 73'
Manager:
Amelia Valverde

Player of the Match:
Aitana Bonmatí (Spain)

Assistant referees:
Ramina Tsoi (Kyrgyzstan)
Xie Lijun (China)
Fourth official:
Kim Yu-jeong (South Korea)
Video assistant referee:
Marco Fritz (Germany)
Assistant video assistant referee:
Armando Villarreal (United States)
Offside video assistant referee:
Sian Massey-Ellis (England)

=== Zambia vs Japan ===
22 July 2023
19:00

Zambia	0–5	Japan
	Report	Miyazawa 43', 62'; Mi. Tanaka 55'; Endō 71'; Ueki 90+11' (pen.)

Waikato Stadium, Hamilton
Attendance: 16,111
Referee: Tess Olofsson (Sweden)

Zambia	Japan

GK	1	Catherine Musonda	(yellow card) 51' (yellow-red card) 90+7'
RB	8	Margaret Belemu
CB	15	Agness Musase
CB	3	Lushomo Mweemba		(substituted off) 82'
LB	13	Martha Tembo
DM	4	Susan Banda
CM	14	Ireen Lungu		(substituted off) 72'
CM	12	Evarine Katongo
RF	17	Racheal Kundananji
CF	11	Barbra Banda (c)
LF	19	Siomala Mapepa		(substituted off) 72'
Substitutions:
FW	7	Lubandji Ochumba		(substituted in) 72'
MF	21	Avell Chitundu		(substituted in) 72' (substituted off) 90+9'
DF	23	Vast Phiri		(substituted in) 82'
GK	18	Eunice Sakala		(substituted in) 90+9'
Manager:
Bruce Mwape

GK	1	Ayaka Yamashita
CB	23	Rion Ishikawa
CB	4	Saki Kumagai (c)
CB	3	Moeka Minami
RM	2	Risa Shimizu
CM	10	Fūka Nagano
CM	14	Yui Hasegawa
LM	13	Jun Endō	(substituted off) 77'
RF	15	Aoba Fujino	(substituted off) 77'
CF	11	Mina Tanaka	(substituted off) 66'
LF	7	Hinata Miyazawa	(substituted off) 90+3'
Substitutions:
FW	9	Riko Ueki	(substituted in) 66'
MF	8	Hikaru Naomoto	(substituted in) 77'
DF	17	Kiko Seike	(substituted in) 77'
FW	22	Remina Chiba	(substituted in) 90+3'
Manager:
Futoshi Ikeda

Player of the Match:
Hinata Miyazawa (Japan)

Assistant referees:
Lucie Ratajová (Czech Republic)
Polyxeni Irodotou (Cyprus)
Fourth official:
Anahí Fernández (Uruguay)
Video assistant referee:
Massimiliano Irrati (Italy)
Assistant video assistant referee:
Salomé Di Iorio (Argentina)
Offside video assistant referee:
Franca Overtoom (Netherlands)

=== Japan vs Costa Rica ===
26 July 2023
17:00

Japan	2–0	Costa Rica
Naomoto 25'; Fujino 27'	Report

Forsyth Barr Stadium, Dunedin
Attendance: 6,992
Referee: Maria Sole Ferrieri Caputi (Italy)

Japan	Costa Rica

GK	1	Ayaka Yamashita
CB	5	Shiori Miyake
CB	4	Saki Kumagai (c)
CB	3	Moeka Minami
RM	2	Risa Shimizu	(substituted off) 90+1'
CM	14	Yui Hasegawa
CM	16	Honoka Hayashi	(substituted off) 74'
LM	6	Hina Sugita
RF	15	Aoba Fujino	(substituted off) 59'
CF	11	Mina Tanaka	(substituted off) 59'
LF	8	Hikaru Naomoto	(substituted off) 74'
Substitutions:
MF	7	Hinata Miyazawa	(substituted in) 59'
FW	9	Riko Ueki	(substituted in) 59'
MF	10	Fūka Nagano	(substituted in) 74'
DF	17	Kiko Seike	(substituted in) 74'
DF	19	Miyabi Moriya	(substituted in) 90+1'
Manager:
Futoshi Ikeda

GK	23	Daniela Solera
RB	3	María Coto
CB	20	Fabiola Villalobos
CB	4	Mariana Benavides
LB	12	María Paula Elizondo
RM	7	Melissa Herrera
CM	16	Katherine Alvarado (c)
CM	15	Cristín Granados		(substituted off) 64'
LM	2	Gabriela Guillén		(substituted off) 46'
CF	9	María Paula Salas		(substituted off) 76'
CF	14	Priscila Chinchilla	(yellow card) 86'
Substitutions:
MF	10	Gloriana Villalobos		(substituted in) 46'
MF	11	Raquel Rodríguez		(substituted in) 64'
MF	21	Sheika Scott		(substituted in) 76'
Manager:
Amelia Valverde

Player of the Match:
Hikaru Naomoto (Japan)

Assistant referees:
Francesca Di Monte (Italy)
Mihaela Țepușă (Romania)
Fourth official:
Myriam Marcotte (Canada)
Video assistant referee:
Massimiliano Irrati (Italy)
Assistant video assistant referee:
Salomé di Iorio (Argentina)
Offside video assistant referee:
Sian Massey-Ellis (England)

=== Spain vs Zambia ===
26 July 2023
19:30

Spain	5–0	Zambia
Abelleira 9'; Hermoso 13', 70'; Redondo 69', 85'	Report

Eden Park, Auckland
Attendance: 20,983
Referee: Oh Hyeon-jeong (South Korea)

Spain	Zambia

GK	1	Misa Rodríguez
RB	2	Ona Batlle	(substituted off) 46'
CB	4	Irene Paredes
CB	5	Ivana Andrés (c)
LB	19	Olga Carmona
DM	3	Teresa Abelleira
CM	6	Aitana Bonmatí	(substituted off) 61'
CM	11	Alexia Putellas	(substituted off) 46'
RF	18	Salma Paralluelo	(substituted off) 46'
CF	10	Jennifer Hermoso
LF	8	Mariona Caldentey	(substituted off) 83'
Substitutions:
FW	17	Alba Redondo	(substituted in) 46'
DF	12	Oihane Hernández	(substituted in) 46'
FW	15	Eva Navarro	(substituted in) 46'
MF	7	Irene Guerrero	(substituted in) 61'
FW	22	Athenea del Castillo	(substituted in) 83'
Manager:
Jorge Vilda

GK	18	Eunice Sakala
RB	8	Margaret Belemu
CB	15	Agness Musase
CB	3	Lushomo Mweemba		(substituted off) 76'
LB	13	Martha Tembo	(yellow card) 90+10'
DM	4	Susan Banda		(substituted off) 37'
CM	14	Ireen Lungu
CM	12	Evarine Katongo		(substituted off) 76'
RF	19	Siomala Mapepa		(substituted off) 37'
CF	11	Barbra Banda (c)
LF	17	Racheal Kundananji
Substitutions:
MF	6	Mary Wilombe		(substituted in) 37'
MF	21	Avell Chitundu		(substituted in) 37'
FW	7	Ochumba Lubandji	(yellow card) 90+1'	(substituted in) 76'
DF	23	Vast Phiri		(substituted in) 76'
Manager:
Bruce Mwape

Player of the Match:
Jennifer Hermoso (Spain)

Assistant referees:
Lee Seul-gi (South Korea)
Park Mi-suk (South Korea)
Fourth official:
Ivana Martinčić (Croatia)
Video assistant referee:
Muhammad Taqi (Singapore)
Assistant video assistant referee:
Abdulla Al-Marri (Qatar)
Offside video assistant referee:
Ella De Vries (Belgium)

=== Japan vs Spain ===
Japan's 23% of possession was the lowest for a winning side at the Women's World Cup since this stat began being recorded in 2011. This match was compared to the Japan men's team's victory against Spain at the 2022 World Cup, in which Japan's 18% of possession was also the lowest for a winning side at the men's World Cup since recording began in 1966.

31 July 2023
19:00

Japan	4–0	Spain
Miyazawa 12', 40'; Ueki 29'; Mi. Tanaka 82'	Report

Wellington Regional Stadium, Wellington
Attendance: 20,957
Referee: Ekaterina Koroleva (United States)

Japan	Spain

GK	1	Ayaka Yamashita
CB	12	Hana Takahashi
CB	4	Saki Kumagai (c)
CB	3	Moeka Minami
RM	2	Risa Shimizu	(substituted off) 59'
CM	10	Fūka Nagano	(substituted off) 59'
CM	16	Honoka Hayashi
LM	13	Jun Endō	(substituted off) 85'
RF	7	Hinata Miyazawa	(substituted off) 46'
CF	9	Riko Ueki	(substituted off) 67'
LF	8	Hikaru Naomoto
Substitutions:
MF	15	Aoba Fujino	(substituted in) 46'
DF	19	Miyabi Moriya	(substituted in) 59'
MF	14	Yui Hasegawa	(substituted in) 59'
FW	11	Mina Tanaka	(substituted in) 67'
MF	6	Hina Sugita	(substituted in) 85'
Manager:
Futoshi Ikeda

GK	1	Misa Rodríguez
RB	2	Ona Batlle
CB	4	Irene Paredes
CB	20	Rocío Gálvez
LB	19	Olga Carmona (c)	(yellow card) 45+1'	(substituted off) 46'
DM	3	Teresa Abelleira		(substituted off) 72'
CM	6	Aitana Bonmatí
CM	11	Alexia Putellas		(substituted off) 62'
RF	18	Salma Paralluelo		(substituted off) 82'
CF	10	Jennifer Hermoso
LF	8	Mariona Caldentey		(substituted off) 62'
Substitutions:
DF	12	Oihane Hernández	(yellow card) 89'	(substituted in) 46'
FW	15	Eva Navarro		(substituted in) 62'
FW	17	Alba Redondo		(substituted in) 62'
MF	21	Claudia Zornoza		(substituted in) 72'
FW	9	Esther González		(substituted in) 82'
Manager:
Jorge Vilda

Player of the Match:
Hinata Miyazawa (Japan)

Assistant referees:
Kathryn Nesbitt (United States)
Felisha Mariscal (United States)
Fourth official:
Myriam Marcotte (Canada)
Video assistant referee:
Drew Fischer (Canada)
Assistant video assistant referee:
Armando Villarreal (United States)
Offside video assistant referee:
Mariana de Almeida (Argentina)

=== Costa Rica vs Zambia ===
31 July 2023
19:00

Costa Rica	1–3	Zambia
Herrera 47'	Report	Mweemba 3'; B. Banda 31' (pen.); Kundananji 90+3'

Waikato Stadium, Hamilton
Attendance: 8,117
Referee: Bouchra Karboubi (Morocco)

Costa Rica	Zambia

GK	23	Daniela Solera
RB	5	Valeria del Campo	(yellow card) 23'
CB	20	Fabiola Villalobos
CB	4	Mariana Benavides	(yellow card) 21'
LB	3	María Coto
CM	16	Katherine Alvarado (c)	(yellow card) 6'	(substituted off) 90+1'
CM	11	Raquel Rodríguez
RW	7	Melissa Herrera
AM	10	Gloriana Villalobos		(substituted off) 72'
LW	14	Priscila Chinchilla
CF	21	Sheika Scott		(substituted off) 85'
Substitutions:
FW	9	María Paula Salas		(substituted in) 72'
MF	13	Emilie Valenciano		(substituted in) 85'
MF	19	Alexandra Pinell		(substituted in) 90+1'
Manager:
Amelia Valverde

GK	1	Catherine Musonda
RB	8	Margaret Belemu
CB	15	Agness Musase
CB	3	Lushomo Mweemba
LB	13	Martha Tembo	(yellow card) 40'
DM	4	Susan Banda
CM	20	Hellen Chanda		(substituted off) 90+9'
CM	12	Evarine Katongo		(substituted off) 74'
RF	21	Avell Chitundu		(substituted off) 85'
CF	11	Barbra Banda (c)	(yellow card) 66'
LF	17	Racheal Kundananji
Substitutions:
MF	6	Mary Wilombe		(substituted in) 74'
MF	19	Siomala Mapepa		(substituted in) 85'
MF	9	Hellen Mubanga		(substituted in) 90+9'
Manager:
Bruce Mwape

Player of the Match:
Barbra Banda (Zambia)

Assistant referees:
Fatiha Jermoumi (Morocco)
Soukaina Hamdi (Morocco)
Fourth official:
Kim Yu-jeong (South Korea)
Video assistant referee:
Adil Zourak (Morocco)
Assistant video assistant referee:
Abdulla Al-Marri (Qatar)
Offside video assistant referee:
Sian Massey-Ellis (England)

== Discipline ==
Fair play points would have been used as tiebreakers in the group should the overall and head-to-head records of teams were tied. These were calculated based on yellow and red cards received in all group matches as follows:

- first yellow card: minus 1 point;
- indirect red card (second yellow card): minus 3 points;
- direct red card: minus 4 points;
- yellow card and direct red card: minus 5 points;

Only one of the above deductions was applied to a player in a single match.

Team	Match 1				Match 2				Match 3				Points
Team	Booked	(yellow card) (yellow-red card)	Sent off (straight red)	(yellow card) (red card)	Booked	(yellow card) (yellow-red card)	Sent off (straight red)	(yellow card) (red card)	Booked	(yellow card) (yellow-red card)	Sent off (straight red)	(yellow card) (red card)	Points
Japan													0
Spain									2				–2
Costa Rica					1				3				–4
Zambia		1			2				2				–7

== See also ==
- Costa Rica at the FIFA Women's World Cup
- Japan at the FIFA Women's World Cup
- Spain at the FIFA Women's World Cup
- Zambia at the FIFA Women's World Cup
