= Costa Rica at the FIFA Women's World Cup =

The Costa Rica women's national football team has represented Costa Rica at the FIFA Women's World Cup on two occasions, in 2015 and 2023.

== FIFA Women's World Cup record ==
World Cup Finals
Year	Result	Position	Pld	W	D	L	GF	GA
(China) 1991	Did not qualify							
(Sweden) 1995	Did not enter							
(United States) 1999	Did not qualify							
(United States) 2003	Did not qualify							
(China) 2007	Did not qualify							
(Germany) 2011	Did not qualify							
(Canada) 2015	Group stage	18th	3	0	2	1	3	4
(France) 2019	Did not qualify							
(Australia) (New Zealand) 2023	Group stage	30th	3	0	0	3	1	8
(Brazil) 2027	To be determined							
(Costa Rica) (Jamaica) (Mexico) (United States) 2031	Qualified							
(United Kingdom) 2035	To be determined							
Total	3/12	18th	6	0	2	4	4	12

*Draws include knockout matches decided on penalty kicks.

FIFA Women's World Cup history
Year	Round	Date	Opponent	Result	Stadium
(Canada) 2015	Group stage	9 June	Spain	D 1–1	Olympic Stadium, Montreal
(Canada) 2015	Group stage	13 June	South Korea	D 2–2	Olympic Stadium, Montreal
(Canada) 2015	Group stage	17 June	Brazil	L 0–1	Moncton Stadium, Moncton
(Australia) (New Zealand) 2023	Group stage	21 July	Spain	L 0–3	Wellington Regional Stadium, Wellington
(Australia) (New Zealand) 2023	Group stage	26 July	Japan	L 0–2	Forsyth Barr Stadium, Dunedin
(Australia) (New Zealand) 2023	Group stage	31 July	Zambia	L 1–3	Waikato Stadium, Hamilton

== Head-to-head record ==
Opponent	Pld	W	D	L	GF	GA	GD	Win %
Brazil	1	0	0	1	0	1	−1	0.00
Japan	1	0	0	1	0	2	−2	0.00
South Korea	1	0	1	0	2	2	+0	0.00
Spain	2	0	1	1	1	4	−3	0.00
Zambia	1	0	0	1	1	3	−2	0.00
Total	6	0	2	4	4	12	−8	0.00

== 2015 FIFA Women's World Cup ==
=== Group E ===
Pos	Team	Pld	W	D	L	GF	GA	GD	Pts	Qualification
1	Brazil	3	3	0	0	4	0	+4	9	Advance to knockout stage
2	South Korea	3	1	1	1	4	5	−1	4	Advance to knockout stage
3	Costa Rica	3	0	2	1	3	4	−1	2	
4	Spain	3	0	1	2	2	4	−2	1	

Source: FIFA
Rules for classification: Group stage tiebreakers
9 June 2015
16:00 EDT (UTC−4)

Spain	1–1	Costa Rica
Losada 13'	Report	R. Rodríguez 14'

Olympic Stadium, Montreal
Attendance: 10,175
Referee: Salomé di Iorio (Argentina)
13 June 2015
19:00 EDT (UTC−4)

South Korea	2–2	Costa Rica
Ji So-yun 21' (pen.); Jeon Ga-eul 25'	Report	Herrera 17'; K. Villalobos 89'

Olympic Stadium, Montreal
Attendance: 28,623
Referee: Carina Vitulano (Italy)
17 June 2015
20:00 ADT (UTC−3)

Costa Rica	0–1	Brazil
	Report	Raquel 83'

Moncton Stadium, Moncton
Attendance: 9,543
Referee: Efthalia Mitsi (Greece)

== 2023 FIFA Women's World Cup ==
=== Group C ===
Pos	Team	Pld	W	D	L	GF	GA	GD	Pts	Qualification
1	Japan	3	3	0	0	11	0	+11	9	Advance to knockout stage
2	Spain	3	2	0	1	8	4	+4	6	Advance to knockout stage
3	Zambia	3	1	0	2	3	11	−8	3	
4	Costa Rica	3	0	0	3	1	8	−7	0	

Source: FIFA
Rules for classification: Group stage tiebreakers
21 July 2023
19:30 UTC+12

Spain	3–0	Costa Rica
Del Campo 21' (o.g.); Bonmatí 23'; González 27'	Report

Wellington Regional Stadium, Wellington
Attendance: 22,966
Referee: Casey Reibelt (Australia)

26 July 2023
17:00 UTC+12

Japan	2–0	Costa Rica
Naomoto 25'; Fujino 27'	Report

Forsyth Barr Stadium, Dunedin
Attendance: 6,992
Referee: Maria Sole Ferrieri Caputi (Italy)

31 July 2023
19:00 UTC+12

Costa Rica	1–3	Zambia
Herrera 47'	Report	Mweemba 3'; B. Banda 31' (pen.); Kundananji 90+3'

Waikato Stadium, Hamilton
Attendance: 8,117
Referee: Bouchra Karboubi (Morocco)

== Goalscorers ==
Player	Goals	2015	2023
Melissa Herrera	2	1	1
Raquel Rodríguez	1	1	
Karla Villalobos	1	1	
Total	4	3	1

Own goals scored for opponents

- Valeria del Campo (scored for Spain in 2023)
