= List of Brazil women's international footballers =

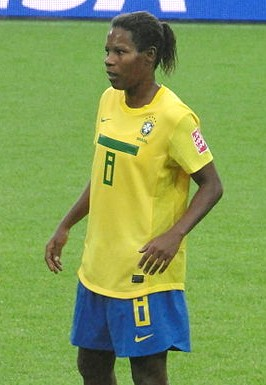
Formiga is the women's overall record holder, with 234 caps.

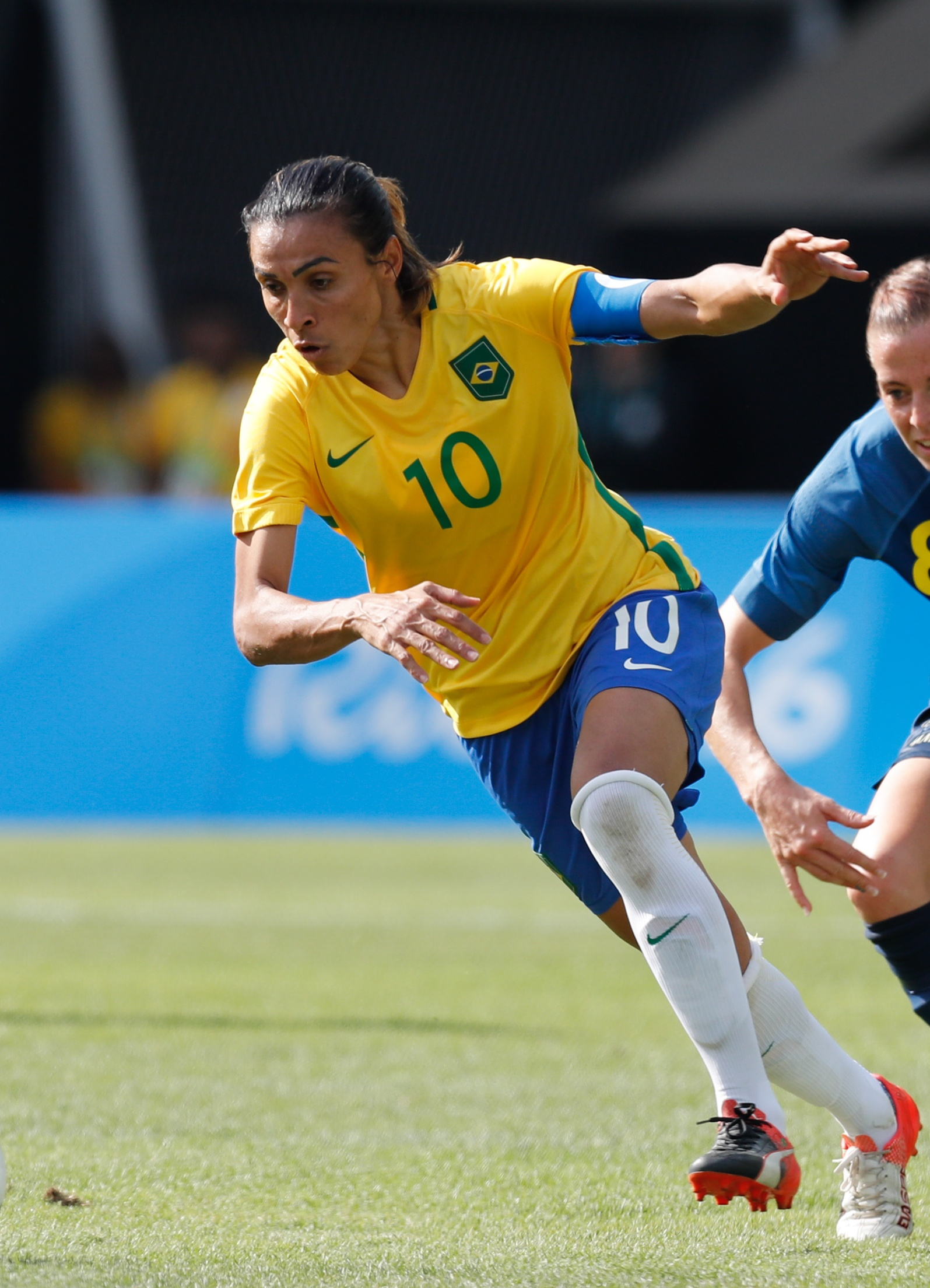
Marta is the all-time top scorer, having scored 116 goals in 186 matches.

The Brazil women's national football team has represented Brazil in international women's football matches since 1986. The women's national team is controlled by the Brazilian Football Confederation (CBF), the governing body for football in Brazil, which is a part of CONMEBOL, under the jurisdiction of FIFA.

Formiga is the player with the most appearances for the Brazilian women's national team with 234 caps since her debut at the 1995 FIFA Women's World Cup. She was a member of the Brazil national team for 26 years (the longest in football history) and is the most capped football player in the history of the Brazil national teams (men's or women's), gaining her 234th and final cap in a 6–1 win over India at the 2021 International Women's Football Tournament of Manaus. Marta holds the record for being the all-time leading goal scorer, with an impressive tally of 119 goals in 204 appearances.

The following list of Brazil women's international footballers covers all football players with 30 or more official caps for the Brazilian women's national football team as recorded by the Brazilian Football Confederation. The players are listed here sorted first by the total number of caps, and then by the number of goals.

== Key ==
Player
Bold indicate that the player was active at club level as at the date specified above.

Positions key
Pre-1960s		1960s–	
GK	Goalkeeper		
FB	Full back	DF	Defender
HB	Half back	MF	Midfielder
FW	Forward		

Position
Playing positions are listed according to the tactical formations that were employed at the time. Thus the change in the names of defensive and midfield positions reflects the tactical evolution that occurred from the 1960s onwards.
Caps and goals
Caps and goals comprise those in the FIFA Women's World Cup and Copa América Femenina, their associated qualification matches, and international friendly tournaments and matches.

== List of players ==
As of 1 December 2024

Name	Pos.	Caps	Goals	National team career
Formiga	MF	234	29	1995–2021
**Marta**	FW	204	119	2003–2024
**Cristiane**	FW	165	97	2003–present
**Tamires**	DF	148	7	2013–present
**Debinha**	FW	146	61	2011–present
**Bia Zaneratto**	FW	124	42	2011–present
Rosana Augusto	DF	114	21	2000–2017
**Andressa Alves**	MF	107	21	2012–present
Andréia Suntaque	GK	96	0	1999–2015
**Rafaelle**	DF	94	9	2011–present
Fabiana	DF	89	8	2006–2019
**Thaísa Moreno**	MF	87	6	2013–2023
**Bruna Benites**	DF	77	9	2012–2021
Renata Costa	MF	71	25	2003–2012
Bárbara	GK	69	0	2007–2023
Pretinha	MF	68	42	1991–2014
**Adriana**	FW	65	16	2017–present
Simone	DF	57	4	2000–2008
**Geyse**	FW	56	9	2017–present
**Ludmila**	FW	56	6	2017–present
Ester	MF	56	1	2003–2012
**Raquel**	FW	52	8	2013–2023
Aline	DF	49	7	2004–2012
Sissi	FW	47	33	1988–2000
Kátia Cilene	FW	47	29	1995–2007
Roseli	FW	45	42	1988–2004
Maurine	MF	45	11	2007–2017
**Kerolin**	FW	45	6	2018–present
**Antônia**	DF	45	1	2020–present
**Luciana**	GK	44	0	2013–present
**Andressinha**	MF	43	10	2012–2023
**Mônica**	DF	42	6	2014–2023
**Poliana**	DF	41	2	2012–2023
**Ary Borges**	MF	40	8	2020–present
**Gabi Nunes**	FW	39	8	2016–present
**Luana**	MF	38	2	2012–present
Tânia	DF	37	3	1995–2008
**Angelina**	MF	33	1	2021–present
**Darlene**	FW	32	4	2013–2023
**Lorena**	GK	32	0	2021–present
**Duda Sampaio**	MF	31	2	2022–present
**Tayla**	DF	31	1	2014–2020

== See also ==
- List of Brazil international footballers
