= FK Kosonsoy =

- Full name: Kosonsoy futbol klubi
- Ground: Markaziy Stadium, Kosonsoy
- Capacity: 22,000
- Manager: Mehmon Solikhodjaev
- League: Uzbekistan First League
- 2013: 13th

FK Kosonsoy (Uzbek: Косонсой футбол клуби) is an Uzbekistani football club based in Kosonsoy, Namangan Province. Currently it plays in Uzbekistan First League

== History ==
FK Kosonsoy played in first Oliy League season in 1992 under name Kosonsoychi Kosonsoy. The club changed its name several times. Kosonsoy completed 5 seasons in top league of uzbek football. The last season club played in Uzbek League is 1998. In 2013, club played in Uzbekistan First League, Zone "East".

=== Name changes history ===
- 1992: Kosonsoychi Kosonsoy
- 1993: Kosonsoychi
- 1994: Kosonsoychi
- 1995: Kosonsoychi
- 1996–2012: FK Kosonsoy
- 2013: FK Kosonsoy ZK
- 2014: KOSONSOY
- 2015: FC KOSONSOY
- 2016: KOSONSOY
