= 2013 Uzbekistan First League =

Uzbekistan First League
- Season: 2013
- Champions: Mash'al Mubarek

The 2013 Uzbekistan First League was the 22nd season of 2nd level football in Uzbekistan since independence in 1992. It is split in an Eastern and Western zone, each featuring 12 teams.

== Teams and locations ==
Locations of the 2013 Uzbekistan First League Teams

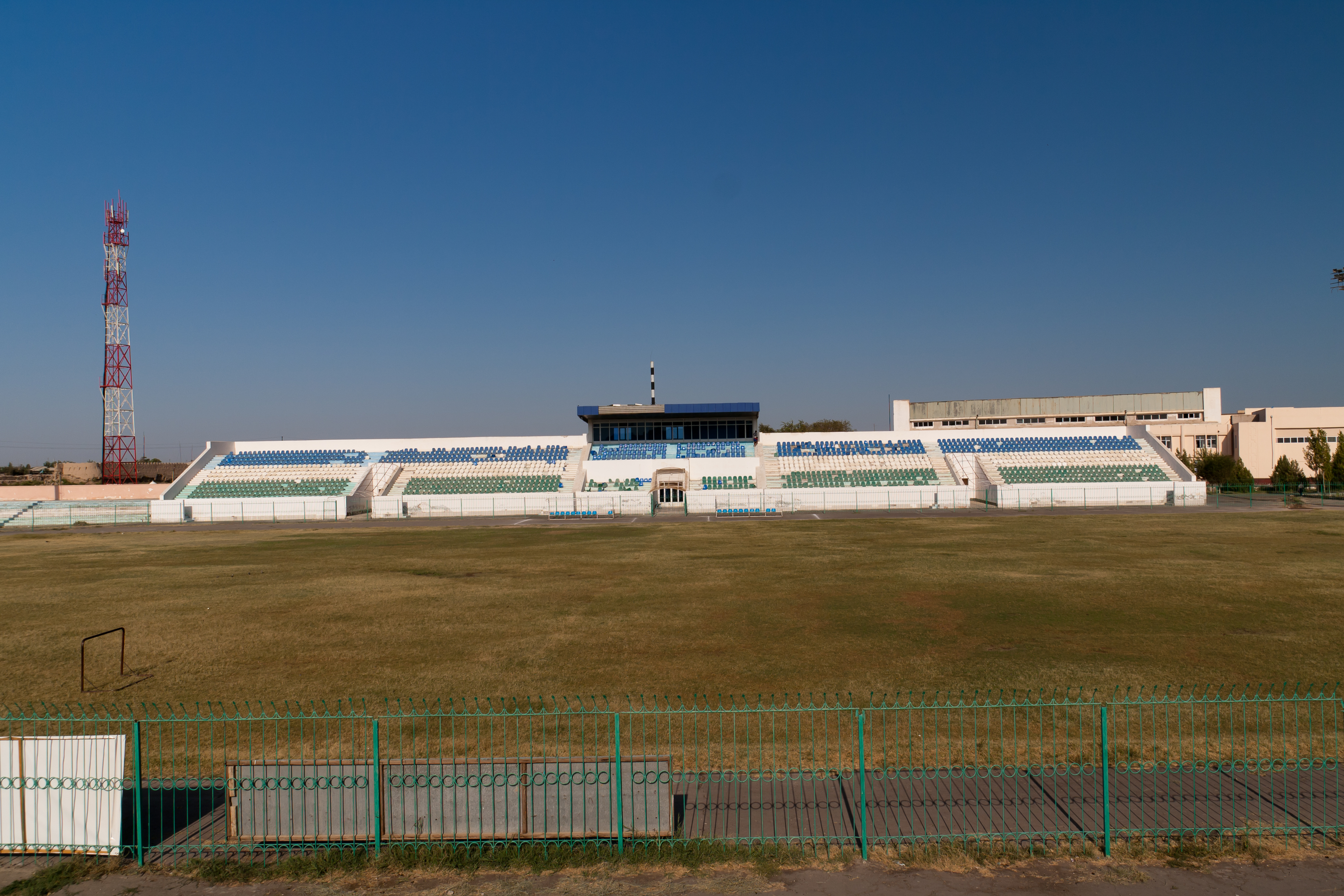
Stadium of FK Khiva

Team	Location	Stadium	Stadium capacity
FK Andijan	Andijan	Soghlom Avlod Stadium	18,360
Hotira-79	Namangan Province		
Chust-Pakhtakor	Chust		
FK Kosonsoy	Kosonsoy		
Ghallakor-Avtomobilchi	Ghallaorol		
Kokand 1912	Kokand		
Neftchi Tinchlik	Fergana Province		
Bunyodkor-2	Tashkent		
Istiqlol	Tashkent		
Lokomotiv BFK	Tashkent		
NBU Osiyo	Tashkent	NBU Stadium	9,100
Oqtepa	Tashkent	Oq-Tepa Stadium	2,000
Pakhtakor-2	Tashkent		
FK Yangiyer	Yangiyer	Yangiyer Stadium	6,000
FK Zaamin	Jizzakh Province		
FK Bukhoro-2	Bukhoro		
Registon	Samarkand		
Sherdor-Presstizh	Samarkand		
Zarafshon PFC	Navoi		
Spartak Bukhoro	Bukhoro		
Mash'al Mubarek	Muborak	Bahrom Vafoev Stadium	10,000
Alanga	Qarshi		
Surkhon	Termez		
FK Khiva	Khiva	Spartak Stadium	8,000
FK Orol Nukus	Nukus		9,300
Xorazm FK Urganch	Urganch	Xorazm Stadium	12,000

== Competition format ==
League consists of two regional groups: conference "East" and "West". The season comprises two phases. The first phase consists of a regular home-and-away schedule: each team plays the other teams twice. The top eight teams of the first phase from each zone will be merged in one tournament and compete for the championship. The bottom four teams of each zone after first phase will play each other to remain in first league.

The draw of the 2013 season was held on 14 March 2013. First League joined Sherdor-Presstizh, Spartak Bukhoro, Alanga Qarshi, Istiqlol Toshkent, Hotira-79 and Lokomotiv BFK.

On 22 March 2013, Uzbek PFL authority announced that FK Khiva and Neftchi Tinchlik are replaced by Bunyodkor-2 and Bukhoro-2 because of lack of the financial support. Bunyodkor-2 to play in East zone and Bukhoro-2 in West zone.

== First phase ==
=== Zone "East" ===
Pos	Team	Pld	W	D	L	GF	GA	GF	Pts	Qualification or relegation
1	FK Andijan	20	17	1	2	46	16	+30	52	Promotion to the 2nd phase of championship
2	Kokand 1912	20	12	3	5	28	22	+6	39	.
3	NBU Osiyo	20	11	3	6	29	16	+7	36	.
4	Oqtepa	20	9	3	6	30	30	0	30	.
5	Chust-Pakhtakor	20	8	6	6	25	29	-4	30	.
6	FK Kosonsoy	20	7	4	9	27	25	+2	25	.
7	FK Yangiyer	20	7	3	10	25	26	-1	24	.
8	Pakhtakor-2	20	7	3	10	25	26	-1	24	.
9	Istiqlol	20	6	5	9	25	29	-4	24	.
10	Hotira-79	20	6	2	12	23	37	-14	20	.
11	Lokomotiv BFK	20	5	5	10	20	36	-16	20	.
12	Bunyodkor-2	20	5	2	13	27	38	-11	17	.

=== Top goalscorers ===
#	Scorer	Goals (Pen.)	Team
1	(Uzbekistan) Husniddin Gafurov	13 (1)	NBU Osiyo
2	(Uzbekistan) Nodir Davlatov	11 (2)	FK Yangiyer
3	(Uzbekistan) Doston Toshmatov	8 (2)	FK Zaamin

=== Zone "West" ===
Pos	Team	Pld	W	D	L	GF	GA	GF	Pts	Qualification or relegation
1	Mash'al Mubarek	20	18	2	0	52	4	+48	56	Promotion to the 2nd phase of championship
2	Zarafshon Navoi	20	12	3	5	28	15	+13	39	.
3	Spartak Bukhoro	20	11	3	6	34	19	+15	36	.
4	Registon	20	9	4	7	26	30	-4	31	.
5	FK Orol Nukus	20	9	2	9	32	26	+6	29	.
6	Sherdor-Presstizh	20	9	2	9	32	34	-2	29	.
7	Surkhon	20	7	7	6	19	22	-3	28	.
8	Xorazm FK Urganch	20	8	2	10	27	26	+1	28	.
9	Alanga Qarshi	20	8	2	10	30	38	-8	26	.
10	FK Zaamin	20	7	2	11	32	35	-3	23	.
11	Ghallakor-Avtomobilchi	20	4	5	11	20	33	-13	17	.
12	Bukhoro-2	20	0	2	18	12	62	-50	2	.

=== Top goalscorers ===
#	Scorer	Goals (Pen.)	Team
1	(Uzbekistan) Jamshid Khasanov	12 (2)	Mash'al Mubarek
2	(Uzbekistan) Firdavs Asadov	11 (0)	Spartak Bukhoro
3	(Uzbekistan) Mansur Abdullaev	10 (0)	FK Orol Nukus
4	(Uzbekistan) Murod Bobojonov	9 (0)	Xorazm FK Urganch
5	(Uzbekistan) E.Saidov	8 (0)	Xorazm FK Urganch

== Second phase ==
=== Championship group ===
==== Table before start ====
League table before start of second phase of championship. The matches of second round start on 11–12 August 2013

Pos	Team	Pld	W	D	L	GF	GA	GF	Pts	Qualification or relegation
1	Mash'al Mubarek	14	12	2	0	35	6	+29	38	Promotion to Uzbek League
2	FK Andijan	14	10	2	2	29	14	+15	32	.
3	Kokand 1912	14	9	1	4	20	16	+4	28	.
4	Zarafshon Navoi	14	8	3	3	18	10	+8	27	.
5	NBU Osiyo	14	7	2	5	21	11	+10	23	.
6	Spartak Bukhoro	14	6	3	5	22	17	+5	21	.
7	Chust-Pakhtakor	14	6	2	6	18	20	-2	20	.
8	Sherdor-Presstizh	14	6	1	7	17	21	-4	19	.
9	Oqtepa	14	5	2	7	16	22	-4	17	.
10	FK Kosonsoy	14	4	3	7	14	21	-7	15	.
11	Xorazm FK Urganch	14	4	2	8	13	19	-6	14	.
12	Registon	14	4	2	8	9	25	-16	14	.
13	FK Orol Nukus	14	4	2	8	18	19	-1	14	.
14	FK Yangiyer	14	4	1	9	17	24	-7	13	.
15	Alanga Qarshi	14	4	1	9	15	30	-15	13	.
16	Pakhtakor-2	14	3	3	8	13	20	-7	12	.

==== League table ====
In 2nd, championship phase Istiqlol Tashkent replaced FK Yangiyer in the tournament.

Pos	Team	Pld	W	D	L	GF	GA	GF	Pts	Qualification or relegation
1	Mash'al Mubarek	30	24	3	3	76	16	+50	75	Promotion to Uzbek League
2	FK Andijan	30	23	2	5	76	24	+52	71	.
3	Kokand 1912	30	18	5	7	49	31	+18	59	.
4	Zarafshon Navoi	30	15	7	8	53	43	+10	52	.
5	Spartak Bukhoro	30	15	3	12	51	45	+6	48	.
6	Xorazm FK Urganch	30	14	5	11	41	34	+7	47	.
7	NBU Osiyo	30	13	4	13	42	42	0	43	.
8	Chust-Pakhtakor	30	12	4	14	42	57	-15	40	.
9	Sherdor-Presstizh	30	12	3	15	39	49	-10	39	.
10	Oqtepa	30	10	7	12	39	48	-9	37	.
11	Istiqlol	30	9	8	13	31	40	-9	35	replaced FK Yangiyer
12	Registon	30	9	5	16	34	58	-24	32	.
13	FK Kosonsoy	30	9	4	17	37	55	-18	31	.
14	Alanga Qarshi	30	7	5	18	32	54	-22	26	.
15	Pakhtakor-2	30	7	4	19	30	55	-25	25	.
16	FK Orol Nukus	30	7	3	20	32	53	-21	24	.

Final standings, updated: 28 October 2013
Source: Soccerway

=== Top goalscorers ===
#	Scorer	Goals (Pen.)	Team
1	(Uzbekistan) Firdavs Asadov	21	Spartak Bukhoro
2	(Uzbekistan) Zokhir Kuziboyev	20	Mash'al Mubarek
3	(Uzbekistan) Murod Bobojonov	19	Xorazm FK Urganch
4	(Uzbekistan) Nizom Norov	18	Chust-Pakhtakor
5	(Uzbekistan) Maruf Akhmadjonov	16	Oqtepa
