= Yoon Deok-yeo =

South Korean footballer (born 1961)

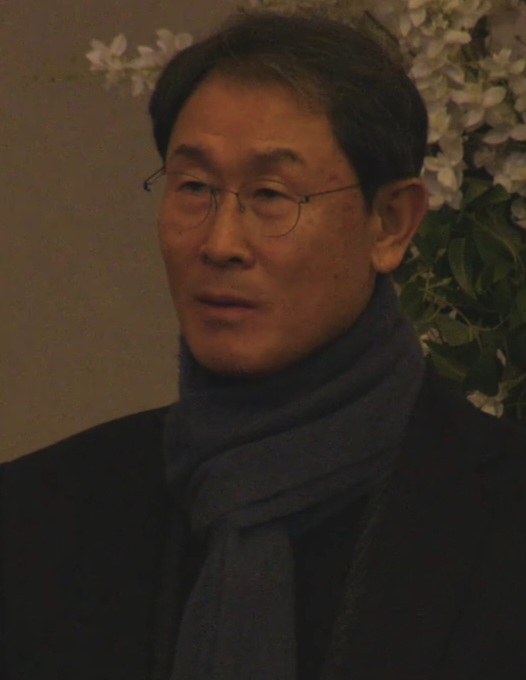
- Yoon in 2022

Personal information
- Date of birth: 25 March 1961 (age 65)
- Height: 1.78 m (5 ft 10 in)
- Position: Defender

Team information
- Current team: Sejong Sportstoto (Manager)

Youth career
- Sungkyunkwan University

Senior career*
Years	Team	Apps	(Gls)
1984–1985	Hanil Bank	45	(0)
1986–1991	Hyundai Horang-i	71	(3)
1992	POSCO Atoms	7	(0)
Total		123	(3)

International career
1989–1991	South Korea	31	(0)

Managerial career
- 1993–1995: Pohang Jecheol Middle School
- 1996–1999: Pohang Steelers (Coach)
- 2001–2003: South Korea U-17
- 2004–2005: Ulsan Hyundai Horang-i (Coach)
- 2005–2011: Gyeongnam FC (Coach)
- 2012: Chunnam Dragons (Technical Coordinator)
- 2012: Chunnam Dragons (Caretaker)
- 2013–2019: South Korea women's
- 2020-: Sejong Sportstoto (Manager)
Medal record
Asian Games
Bronze medal – third place	1990 Beijing	Team
- * Club domestic league appearances and goals

- Yoon Deok-yeo
- Hangul: 윤덕여
- Hanja: 尹德汝
- RR: Yun Deokyeo
- MR: Yun Tŏgyŏ

Yoon Deok-yeo (Korean: 윤덕여; born 25 March 1961) is a South Korean football coach and former player who currently coaches for Sejong Sportstoto. He formerly coached the South Korean women's national team.

== Career ==
Yoon played for the South Korean men's national team at the 1990 FIFA World Cup in Italy, where he was sent off in their final group game against Uruguay.

== Career statistics ==
Appearances and goals by club, season and competition
Club	Season	League		League Cup		AFC Champions League		Total	
Club	Season	Apps	Goals	Apps	Goals	Apps	Goals	Apps	Goals
Hanil Bank	1984	26	0	—		—		26	0
Hanil Bank	1985	19	0	—		—		19	0
Hanil Bank	Total	45	0	—		—		45	0
Hyundai Horang-i	1986	4	0	1	0	—		5	0
Hyundai Horang-i	1987	18	1	—		—		18	1
Hyundai Horang-i	1988	17	1	—		—		17	1
Hyundai Horang-i	1989	8	1	—		—		8	1
Hyundai Horang-i	1990	10	0	—		—		10	0
Hyundai Horang-i	1991	14	0	—		—		14	0
Hyundai Horang-i	Total	71	3	1	0	—		72	3
POSCO Atoms	1992	7	0	5	0	—		12	0
Career total		123	3	6	0	—		129	3
