= Dinnia Díaz =

Costa Rican footballer (born 1988)

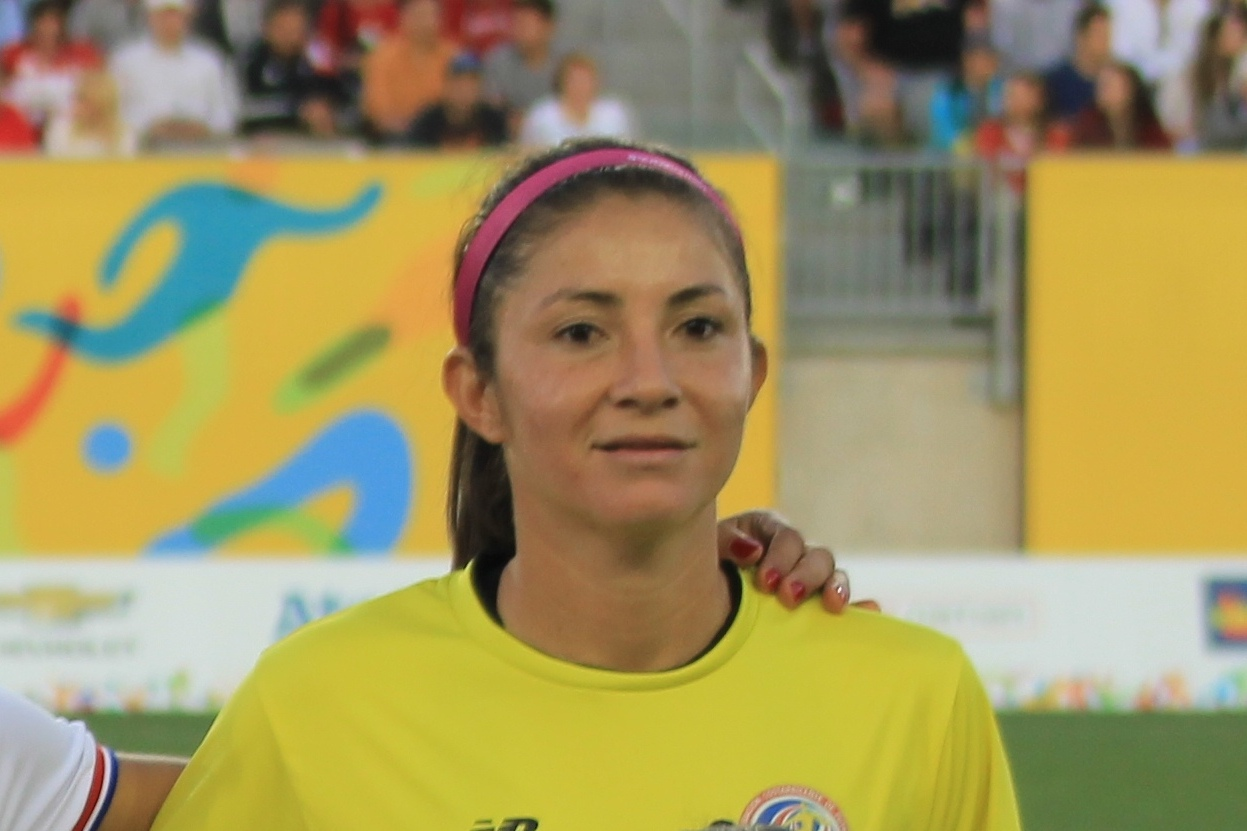

Personal information
- Full name: Dinnia Cecilia Díaz Artavia
- Date of birth: 14 January 1988 (age 38)
- Place of birth: Sámara, Costa Rica
- Height: 1.70 m (5 ft 7 in)
- Position: Goalkeeper

Team information
- Current team: Dimas Escazu

Senior career*
Years	Team	Apps	(Gls)
- UD Moravia
-2023	Saprissa		
2023-	Dimas Escazu		

International career^{‡}
2010–2023	Costa Rica	24	(0)
- * Club domestic league appearances and goals ‡ National team caps and goals as of 16:50, 18 June 2015 (UTC)

Dinnia Cecilia Díaz Artavia (born 14 January 1988) is a Costa Rican footballer who plays as a goalkeeper for Dimas Escazu.
