= Ji Eon-hak =

South Korean footballer (born 1994)

Personal information
- Full name: Ji Eon-hak
- Date of birth: 22 March 1994 (age 32)
- Place of birth: Gumi, South Korea
- Height: 1.78 m (5 ft 10 in)
- Position: Winger

Team information
- Current team: Chungbuk Cheongju
- Number: 27

Youth career
- CIA

Senior career*
Years	Team	Apps	(Gls)
2013–2014	Cristo Atlético	?	(3)
2014–2016	Alcorcón B	50	(7)
2014	Alcorcón	0	(0)
2016	Gyeongju KHNP	9	(0)
2017–2018	Gimhae FC	45	(12)
2019–2021	Incheon United	47	(3)
2021-2022	Gimcheon Sangmu	9	(0)
2023	Asan Mugunghwa FC	10	(2)
2024	Incheon United	6	(1)
2025–	Chungbuk Cheongju	14	(0)

International career
2013–	South Korea U20		
2015–	South Korea U23	5	(2)
- * Club domestic league appearances and goals as of 7 January 2026

Ji Eon-hak (Korean: 지언학; born 22 March 1994), known as Álvaro in Spain, is a South Korean footballer who plays for Chungbuk Cheongju as a left winger.

== Football career ==
Eon-hak was born in Gumi, North Gyeongsang, and began his footballing career at Club Internacional de la Amistad. In October 2013 he moved to CD Cristo Atlético,

Eon-hak joined AD Alcorcón on 25 June 2014, being assigned to the reserves also in the fourth level. He was presented on 2 July, and made his debut for the Madrid side's first team on 11 September, starting in a 0–1 away loss against CD Lugo, for the season's Copa del Rey.
