= Agness Musase =

Zambian footballer (born 1997)

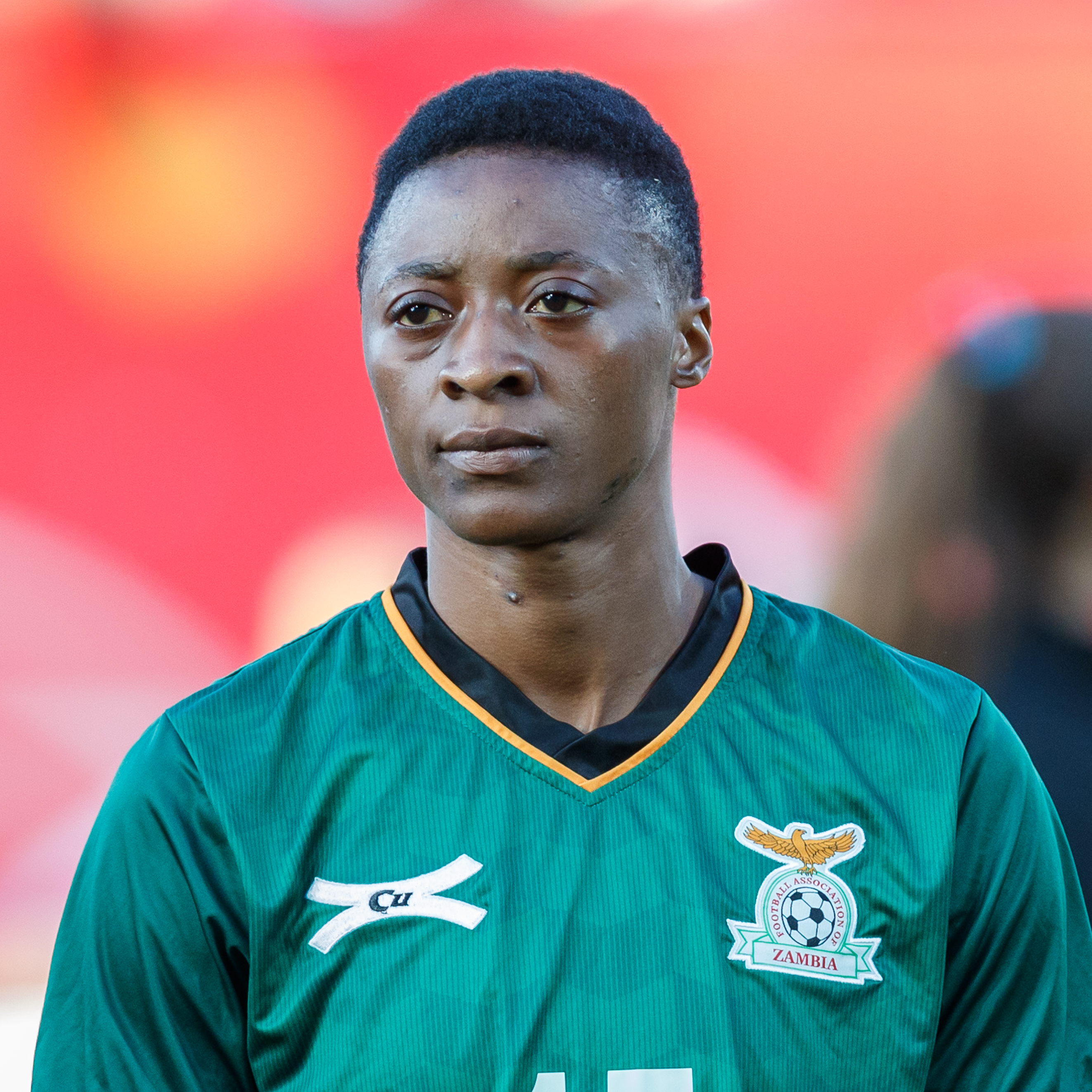

Personal information
- Date of birth: 11 July 1997 (age 29)
- Height: 1.60 m (5 ft 3 in)
- Position: Defender

Team information
- Current team: Green Buffaloes
- Number: 15

Senior career*
Years	Team	Apps	(Gls)
- Green Buffaloes

International career^{‡}
2018–	Zambia	20	(0)
Medal record
Representing Zambia
Women's Africa Cup of Nations
Third place	2022 Morocco
- * Club domestic league appearances and goals ‡ National team caps and goals as of 15 June 2023

Agness Musase (born 11 July 1997) is a Zambian footballer who plays as a defender for the Zambia women's national team. She competed for Zambia at the 2018 Africa Women Cup of Nations, playing in three matches.

Musase was named to the Zambia squad for the 2023 FIFA Women's World Cup.

== Honours ==
Zambia

- COSAFA Women's Championship: 2022
