= Zokhir Kuziboyev =

Uzbek footballer (born 1986)

Personal information
- Date of birth: 11 March 1986 (age 40)
- Place of birth: Uzbekistan
- Position: Forward

Team information
- Current team: Nasaf Qarshi

Senior career*
Years	Team	Apps	(Gls)
2012	Nasaf-2		(13)
2013–2015	Mash'al Mubarek		
2016–	Nasaf Qarshi		

International career^{‡}
2015–	Uzbekistan	3	(1)
- * Club domestic league appearances and goals as of 22 November 2015 ‡ National team caps and goals as of 12 June 2015

Zokhir Kuziboyev (born 11 March 1986) is an Uzbek footballer who plays as a forward for Nasaf Qarshi in the Uzbek League.

== Career ==
He played in 2012 for Nasaf-2. Since 2013 he plays for Mash'al Mubarek. At the end of the season Mash'al promoted to Uzbek League and Kuziboyev became club best goalscorer and 2nd best First League topscorer with 20 goals. In 2014 season he scored 14 goals in Uzbek League and became 2nd best goalscorer with 14 goals after Artur Gevorkyan. He is Mash'al's top goalscorer in 2013-14.

In January 2016 he moved to Nasaf Qarshi.

== International career ==
On 24 March 2015 Kuziboyev was called up for the first time to national team to play against South Korea on 27 March 2015 in Daejeon. He scored his first goal for national team in debut match against South Korea. Kuziboyev's goal ensured Uzbekistan held South Korea to a 1-1 draw.

== Honours ==
- Uzbekistan First League (1): 2013
- UzPFL Cup (1): 2014

== Career statistics ==
=== Club ===
As of 22 November 2015

Club	Season	League		Cup		AFC		Total	
Club	Season	Apps	Goals	Apps	Goals	Apps	Goals	Apps	Goals
Nasaf-2	2012		13	-					13
Mash'al Mubarek	2013		20	4	3	-			23
Mash'al Mubarek	2014	23	14	-				23	14
Mash'al Mubarek	2015	26	4	-				2	0
Total for Mash'al		49	38	4	3	-		53	41
Career total		49	51	4	3	-		53	54

=== International ===
Goals for Senior National Team

#	Date	Venue	Opponent	Score	Result	Competition
1.	27 March 2015	Daejeon, South Korea	South Korea	1–1	1–1	Friendly
Correct as of 27 March 2015
