= Martha Tembo =

Zambian footballer (born 1998)

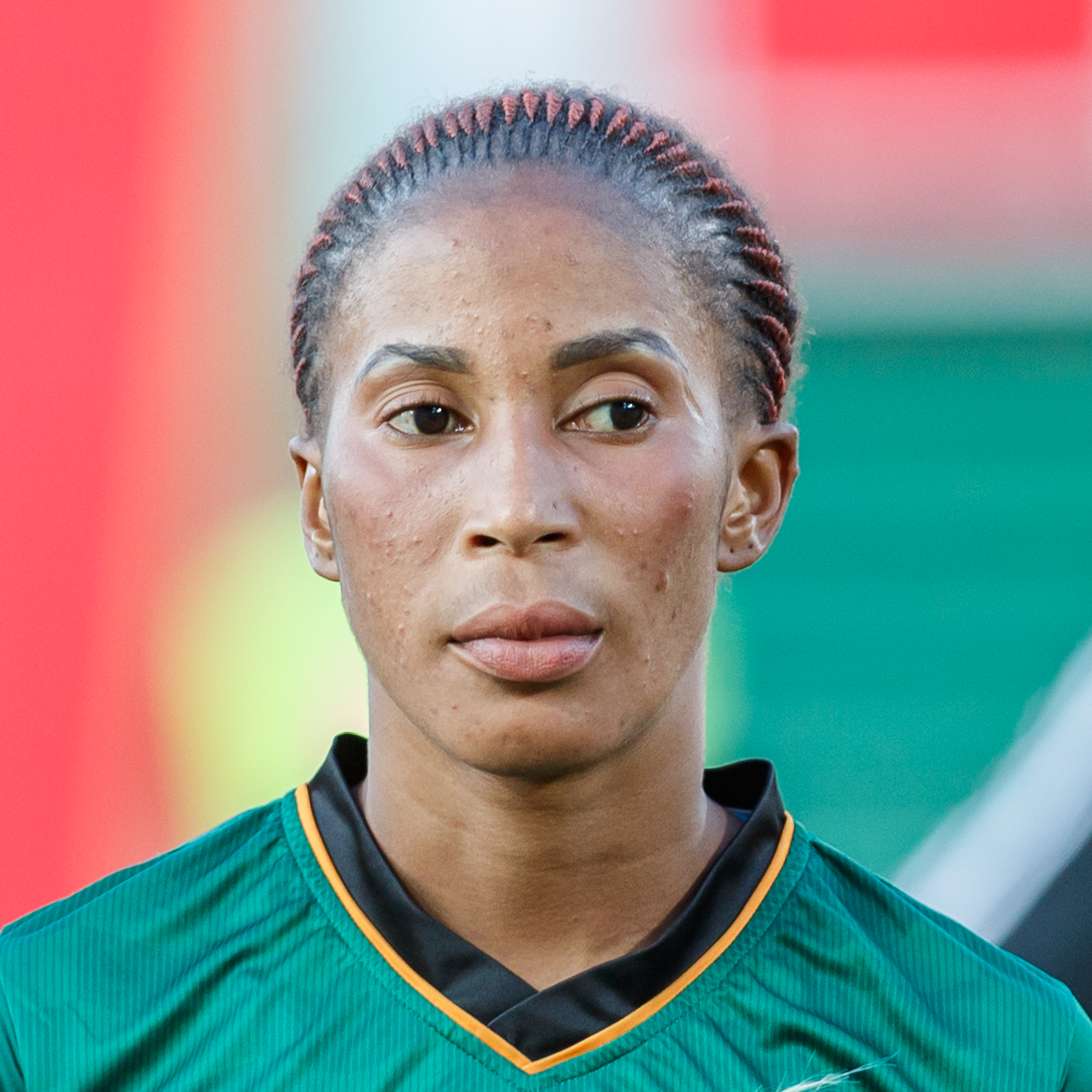

Personal information
- Date of birth: 8 March 1998 (age 28)
- Place of birth: Zambia
- Height: 1.58 m (5 ft 2 in)
- Position: Defender

Team information
- Current team: Hakkarigücü
- Number: 13

Senior career*
Years	Team	Apps	(Gls)
- Green Buffaloes
- BIIK Kazygurt
2024–	Hakkarigücü	26	(1)

International career
2018–	Zambia	23	(0)
Medal record
Representing Zambia
Women's Africa Cup of Nations
Third place	2022 Morocco
- * Club domestic league appearances and goals

Martha Tembo (born 8 March 1998) is a Zambian professional footballer who plays as a defender for Hakkarigücü in the Turkish Super League and Zambia women's national team.

== Club career ==
In September 2024, Tembo moved to Turkey and signed with Hakkarigücü to play in the Super League. She joined Turkish side, Hakkarigucu Spor in 2024 alongside fellow Zambian Lushomo Mweemba.

== International career ==
Tembo was called up to the Zambia squad for the 2018 Women's Africa Cup of Nations. Tembo competed for Zambia at the 2018 Africa Women Cup of Nations, playing in three matches.

On 2 July 2021, Tembo was called up to the 23-player Zambia squad for the delayed 2020 Summer Olympics.

Tembo was called up to the Zambia squad for the 2022 Women's Africa Cup of Nations, where they finished in third place.

Tembo was named to the Zambia squad for the 2023 FIFA Women's World Cup.

On 3 July 2024, Tembo was called up to the Zambia squad for the 2024 Summer Olympics.

== Honours ==
Zambia

COSAFA Women's Championship
Champions (1): 2022
