= Thaisa =

Thaisa may refer to:

- Thaisa Storchi Bergmann (born 1959), Brazilian astrophysicist
- Thaisa Erwin (born 1980), Australian equestrian athlete
- Thaisa Serafini (born 1985), Brazilian squash player
- Thaísa Daher de Menezes (born 1987), Brazilian volleyball player
- Thaisa Moreno (born 1998), Thaisa de Moraes Rosa Moreno, Brazilian football midfielder
- Thaísa Grana Pedretti (born 1999), Brazilian tennis player
