= Lushomo Mweemba =

Zambian footballer (born 2001)

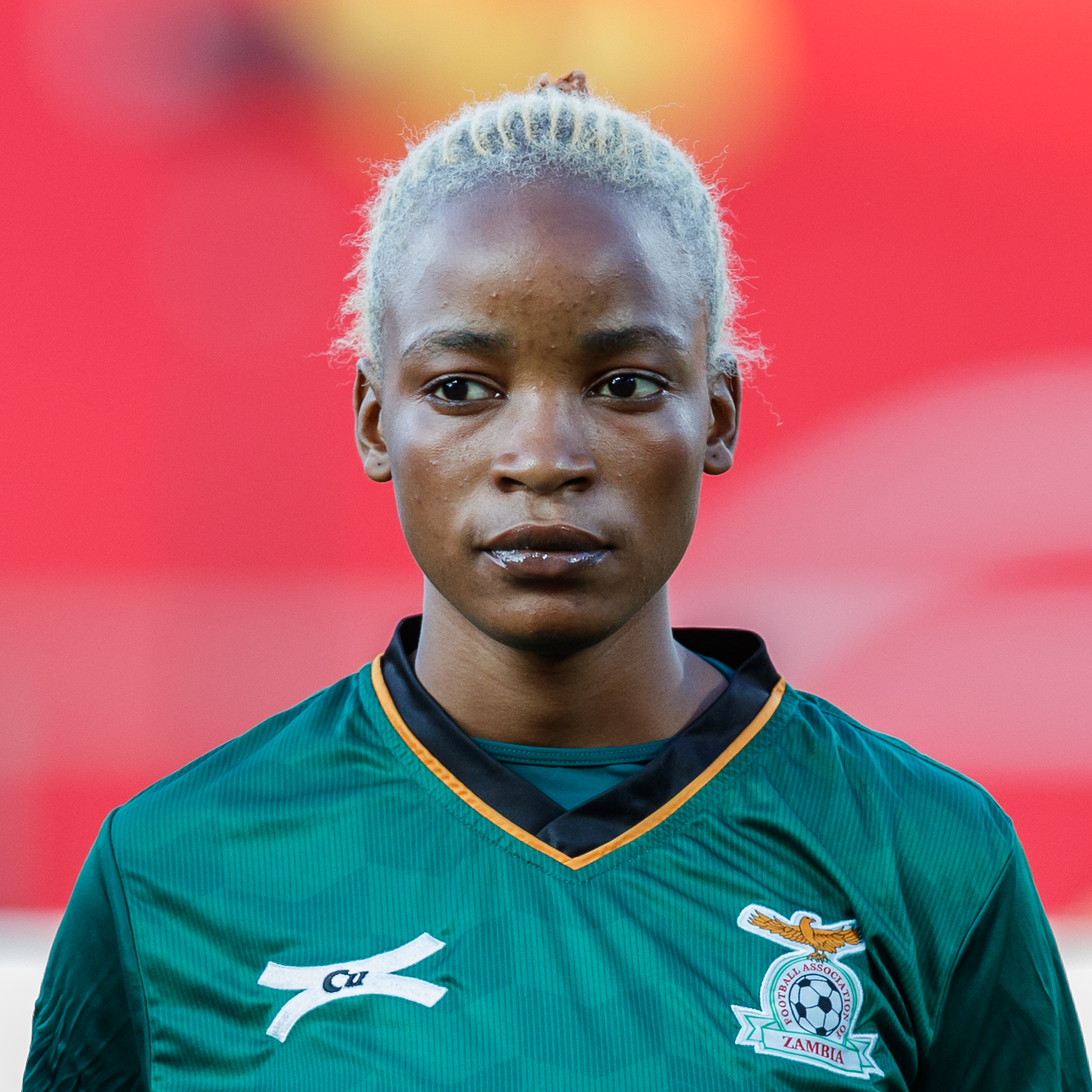

Personal information
- Date of birth: 10 April 2001 (age 25)
- Place of birth: Zambia
- Height: 1.60 m (5 ft 3 in)
- Position: Defender

Team information
- Current team: Hakkarigücü
- Number: 15

Senior career*
Years	Team	Apps	(Gls)
2018–2020	Nkwazi		
2021–	Green Buffaloes		
2024–	Hakkarigücü	25	(2)

International career^{‡}
2018–	Zambia	27	(1)
Medal record
Representing Zambia
Women's Africa Cup of Nations
Third place	2022 Morocco
- * Club domestic league appearances and goals as of 15 October 025 ‡ National team caps and goals as of 31 June 2023

Lushomo Mweemba (born 10 April 2001) is a Zambian professional women's football defender who plays for Hakkarigücü in the Turkish Super League, and the Zambia women's national team.

== Club career ==
In September 2024, she moved to Turkey, and signed with Hakkarigücü to play in the Super League, alongside fellow Zambian Martha Tembo.

== International career ==
Mweemba was called up to the Zambia squad for the 2018 Women's Africa Cup of Nations.

On 2 July 2021, Mweemba was called up to the 23-player Zambia squad for the delayed 2020 Summer Olympics.

Mweemba was called up to the Zambia squad for the 2022 Women's Africa Cup of Nations, where they finished in third place.

Mweemba was named to the Zambia squad for the 2023 FIFA Women's World Cup.

Lushomo Mweemba is the first Zambian to score a goal at a world cup (for both men's and women's seniors teams - scored in 2023 against Costa Rica).

On 3 July 2024, Mweemba was called up to the Zambia squad for the 2024 Summer Olympics.

== International goals ==
Scores and results list Zambia's goal tally first.

No.	Date	Venue	Opponent	Score	Result	Competition
1.	15 September 2018	Wolfson Stadium, Ibhayi, South Africa	Cameroon	1–0	1–0	2018 COSAFA Women's Championship
2.	11 November 2019	Nkoloma Stadium, Lusaka, Zambia	Kenya	1–0	1–0	2020 CAF Women's Olympic Qualifying Tournament
3.	2 May 2021	Nkoloma Stadium, Lusaka, Zambia	Botswana	1–1	1–1	Friendly
4.	26 October 2021	Nkoloma Stadium, Lusaka, Zambia	Malawi	3–2	3–2	2022 Women's Africa Cup of Nations qualification
5.	31 July 2023	Waikato Stadium, Hamilton, New Zealand	Costa Rica	1–0	3–1	2023 FIFA Women's World Cup
6.	29 November 2023	Estádio 22 de Junho, Luanda, Angola	Angola	1–0	6–0	2024 Women's Africa Cup of Nations qualification
7.	5 April 2024	Levy Mwanawasa Stadium, Ndola, Zambia	Morocco	1–1	1–2	2024 CAF Women's Olympic qualifying tournament

== Honours ==
Zambia

COSAFA Women's Championship
Champions (1): 2022
