= Luciana (footballer) =

Brazilian footballer (born 1987)

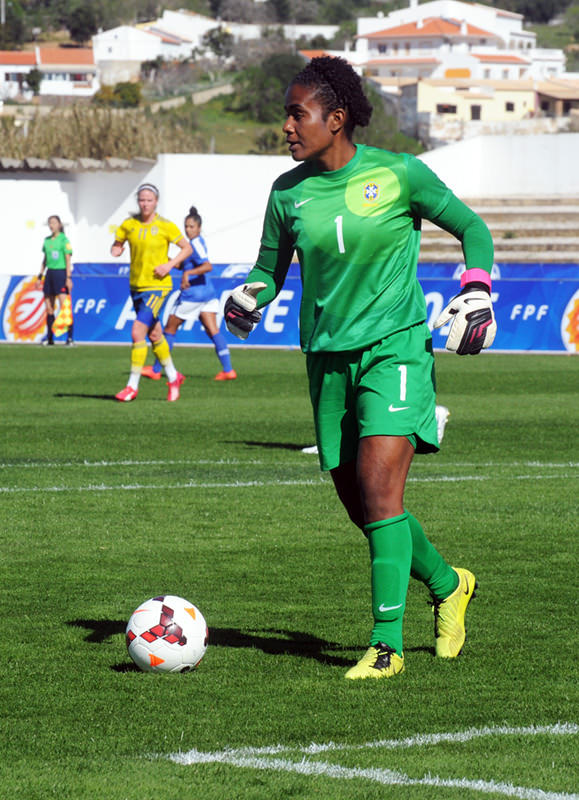
- Luciana at the 2015 Algarve Cup

Personal information
- Full name: Luciana Maria Dionizio
- Date of birth: 24 July 1987 (age 39)
- Place of birth: Belo Horizonte, Minas Gerais, Brazil
- Height: 1.73 m (5 ft 8 in)
- Position: Goalkeeper

Team information
- Current team: Ferroviária
- Number: 1

Senior career*
Years	Team	Apps	(Gls)
- Corinthians
- Atlético Mineiro
2007–2012	Francana		
2013–	Ferroviária	82	(0)

International career^{‡}
2013–	Brazil	37	(0)
Medal record
Women's football
Representing Brazil
Olympic Games
Silver medal – second place	2024 Paris
Pan American Games
Gold medal – first place	2015 Toronto	Team
- * Club domestic league appearances and goals ‡ National team caps and goals as of 17:27, 23 June 2015 (UTC)

Luciana Maria Dionizio (born 24 July 1987), commonly known as Luciana, is a Brazilian professional footballer who plays as a goalkeeper for Ferroviária and the Brazilian national team. She participated at the 2015 FIFA Women's World Cup.

== Early life ==
Luciana was born in Belo Horizonte, Minas Gerais, Brazil. She began playing football as a child with her brothers, but became a goalkeeper because she did not enjoy running. She admired the calmness and serenity displayed by her football role model, male Brazilian goalkeeper Dida.

== Club career ==
In the early part of her career Luciana had spells with Corinthians and Atlético Mineiro. She played for Francana from 2007 until 2012, then joined local rivals Ferroviária ahead of the 2013 season. In April 2014, Luciana saved three penalties in Ferroviária's shootout win over São José in the 2014 Copa do Brasil final.

== International career ==
At the 2006 FIFA U-20 Women's World Championship, Atlético Mineiro player Luciana was part of the Brazilian squad which finished third. After appearing in the senior Brazil squad in 2009, Luciana was not selected again until May 2013 when good form with her club led to a recall for a friendly in Sweden.

She made her senior international debut in December 2013, starting Brazil's 2–0 win over Chile at the 2013 Torneio Internacional de Brasília de Futebol Feminino. After getting a second chance in the national team, Luciana was keen to become the number one goalkeeper ahead of experienced rivals Bárbara and Andréia Suntaque.

Luciana was called up to the Brazil squad for the 2022 Copa América Femenina, which Brazil finished as winners.

At the 2015 FIFA Women's World Cup, Luciana kept clean sheets in all three matches as Brazil qualified from their group without conceding a goal. In the second round match against Australia, Luciana took responsibility for Brazil's defeat when she spilled a shot to Kyah Simon, who scored Australia's winning goal.

Luciana remained in Canada as part of the Brazilian selection for the 2015 Pan American Games in Toronto.

On 1 February 2024, Luciana was called up to the Brazil squad for the 2024 CONCACAF W Gold Cup.

On 2 July 2024, Luciana was called up to the Brazil squad for the 2024 Summer Olympics.

== Honours ==
Brazil

- Summer Olympics silver medal: 2024
