= Melissa Herrera =

Costa Rican footballer (born 1996)

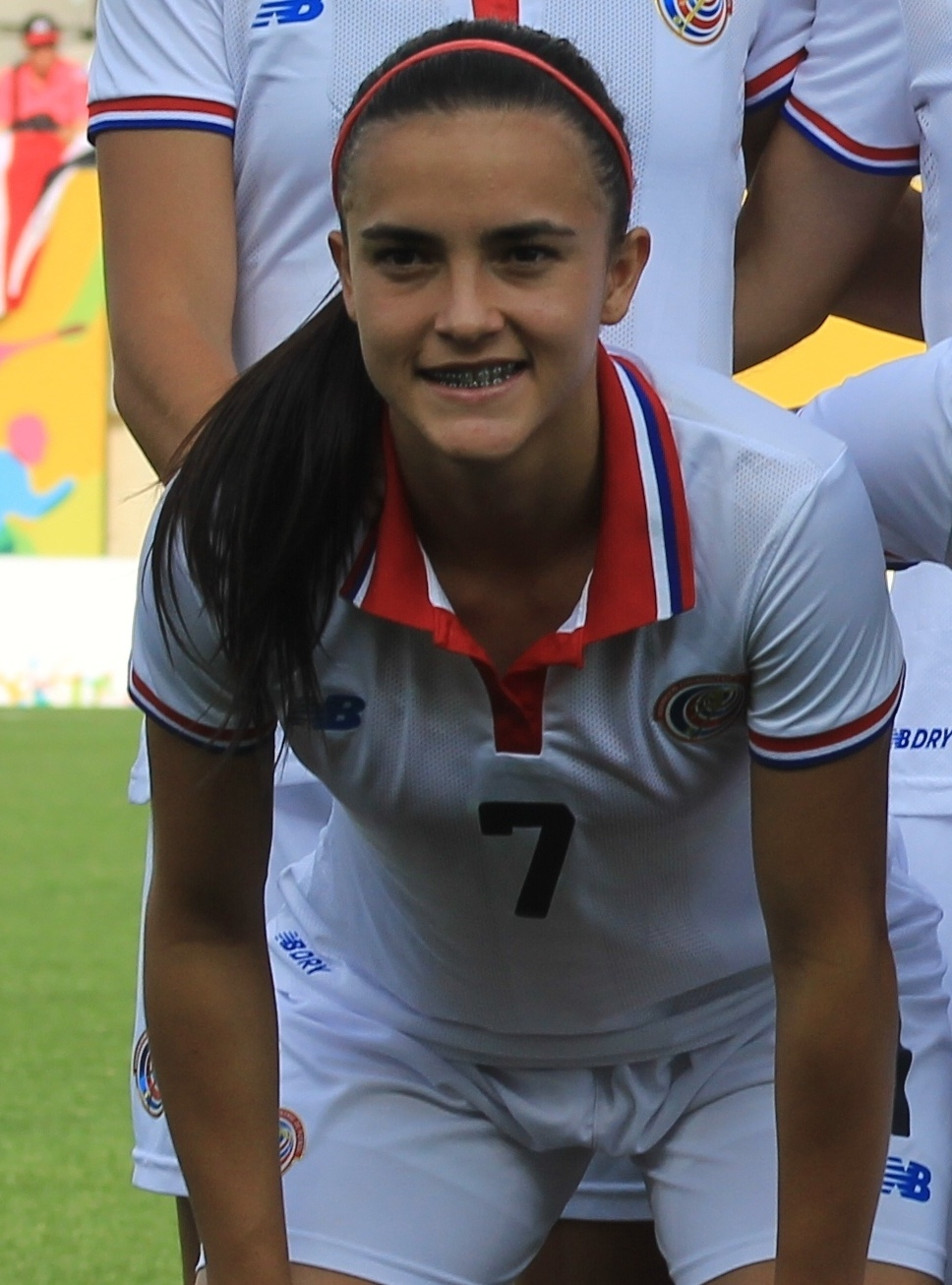
- Herrera with Costa Rica in 2015

Personal information
- Full name: Daphne Melissa Herrera Monge
- Date of birth: 10 October 1996 (age 30)
- Place of birth: San Isidro de El General, Costa Rica
- Height: 1.60 m (5 ft 3 in)
- Position: Forward

Team information
- Current team: Juárez
- Number: 9

Senior career*
Years	Team	Apps	(Gls)
- Deportivo Saprissa
2012–2016	AD Moravia		
2016	F.C. Indiana		
2017–2018	Santa Fe	29	(10)
2018–2021	Reims	47	(18)
2021–2023	Bordeaux	23	(2)
2023–2025	Tijuana	38	(6)
2025–2026	Marseille	14	(4)
2026–	Juárez	0	(0)

International career^{‡}
2013–2015	Costa Rica U20	3	(1)
2014–	Costa Rica	50	(13)
- * Club domestic league appearances and goals as of 21:20, 29 June 2026 (UTC) ‡ National team caps and goals as of 8:05, 12 February (UTC)

Daphne Melissa Herrera Monge (born 10 October 1996), known as Melissa Herrera, is a Costa Rican footballer who plays as a forward for Première Ligue club Les Marseillaises and the Costa Rica women's national team.

== Club career ==
Herrera went through the youth ranks of Deportivo Saprissa in Costa Rica, and played her first senior career season there. She then joined AD Moravia in Costa Rica, too. Herrera then played in United Women's Soccer for FC Indiana for a short time in 2016. From May 2017 to July 2018 she played for Colombian club Independiente Santa Fe.

In July 2018, she moved to France to join Reims.

On 8 June 2021, it was announced that she had reached an agreement to sign for FC Girondins de Bordeaux.

== International career ==
She started playing with Costa Rica U20 in 2013. She played all three of Costa Rica's matches at the 2015 FIFA Women's World Cup. On 13 June 2015, during Costa Rica's second match in the tournament against South Korea, she scored the opening goal of the match which ended 2–2. Herrera continued to play for Costa Rica in the 2023 FIFA Women's World Cup. She scored in their Group C match against Zambia.

== International goals ==
No.	Date	Venue	Opponent	Score	Result	Competition
1	13 June 2015	Olympic Stadium, Montreal, Canada	South Korea	1–0	2–2	2015 FIFA Women's World Cup
2	13 February 2016	Toyota Stadium, Frisco, United States	Puerto Rico	3–0	9–0	2016 CONCACAF Women's Olympic Qualifying Championship
3	14 December 2016	Arena da Amazônia, Manaus, Brazil	Russia	1–2	1–3	2016 International Women's Football Tournament of Manaus
4	12 June 2018	Estadio El Teniente, Rancagua, Chile	Chile	2–2	2–2	Friendly
5	27 August 2018	IMG Academy Field 11, Bradenton, United States	El Salvador	1–0	11–0	2018 CONCACAF Women's Championship qualification
6	27 August 2018	IMG Academy Field 11, Bradenton, United States	El Salvador	7–0	11–0	2018 CONCACAF Women's Championship qualification
7	27 August 2018	IMG Academy Field 11, Bradenton, United States	El Salvador	8–0	11–0	2018 CONCACAF Women's Championship qualification
8	5 October 2018	H-E-B Park, Edinburg, United States	Cuba	1–0	8–0	2018 CONCACAF Women's Championship
9	1 September 2019	Pacaembu Stadium, São Paulo, Brazil	Argentina	3–1	3–1	Friendly
10	29 January 2020	BBVA Stadium, Houston, Texas, United States	Panama	1–0	6–1	2020 CONCACAF Women's Olympic Qualifying Championship
11	29 January 2020	BBVA Stadium, Houston, Texas, United States	Panama	5–1	6–1	2020 CONCACAF Women's Olympic Qualifying Championship
12	20 February 2022	Bethlehem Soccer Stadium, Saint Croix, U.S. Virgin Islands	U.S. Virgin Islands	5–0	6–0	2022 CONCACAF W Championship qualification
13	31 July 2023	Waikato Stadium, Hamilton, New Zealand	Zambia	1–2	1–3	2023 FIFA Women's World Cup
14	25 September 2023	Estadio Alejandro Morera Soto, Alajuela, Costa Rica	Saint Kitts and Nevis	2–0	11–0	2024 CONCACAF W Gold Cup qualification
15	25 September 2023	Estadio Alejandro Morera Soto, Alajuela, Costa Rica	Saint Kitts and Nevis	10–0	11–0	2024 CONCACAF W Gold Cup qualification
16	25 September 2023	Estadio Alejandro Morera Soto, Alajuela, Costa Rica	Saint Kitts and Nevis	11–0	11–0	2024 CONCACAF W Gold Cup qualification
17	4 December 2023	SKNFA Technical Center, Basseterre, Saint Kitts and Nevis	Saint Kitts and Nevis	14–0	19–0	2024 CONCACAF W Gold Cup qualification
18	10 April 2026	Estadio Alejandro Morera Soto, Alajuela, Costa Rica	Cayman Islands	13–0	21–0	2026 CONCACAF W Championship qualification

== Honours ==
Costa Rica

- Central American Games: 2013

Individual

- Première Ligue Player of the Month: March 2021, April 2021

== See also ==
- List of women's footballers with 100 or more international caps
