= Waikato Stadium =

New Zealand sports stadium

FMG Stadium Waikato

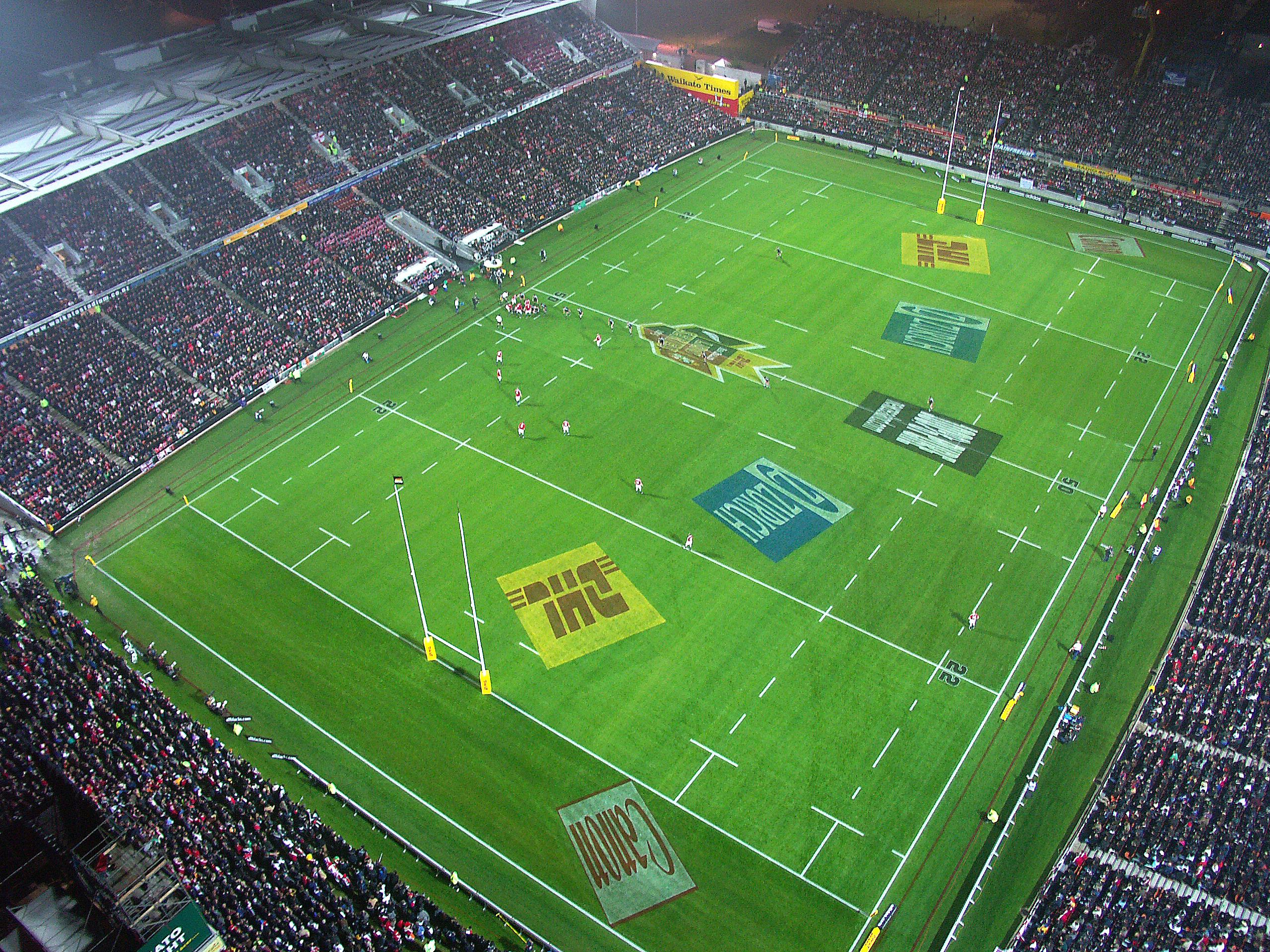
- Interactive map of FMG Stadium Waikato
- Former names: Rugby Park (1925–99)
- Location: Hamilton, New Zealand
- Coordinates: 37°46′52″S 175°16′6″E
- Owner: Hamilton City Council
- Capacity: 25,800
- Surface: Grass

Construction
- Groundbreaking: 2000
- Opened: 1 March 2002

Tenants
- Waikato Rugby Union (2002–present); Chiefs (2002–present); WaiBop United (2015–2016); New Zealand 7s (2018–present)

FMG Stadium Waikato is a major sporting and cultural events venue in Hamilton, New Zealand, with a total capacity of 25,800. Four areas contribute to this capacity: The Brian Perry Stand holding 12,000, the WEL Networks Stand holding 8,000, the Goal Line Terrace holding 800 and the Greenzone can hold up to 5,000 people. The capacity can be extended, however, by temporarily adding 5,000 seats to the Goal Line Terrace area. The stadium, owned by the Hamilton City Council, regularly hosts two rugby union teams:

- The Chiefs in the Southern Hemisphere Super Rugby competition.
- The Waikato side in the country's top provincial rugby competition, the Bunnings NPC.

== History ==
In 1925, Rugby Park opened. In 1930, a rugby union match between Waikato and Great Britain was first broadcast on the radio in Hamilton. In 1937, South Africa visited Hamilton in front of a then record crowd of 13,000. One of the most memorable games at the ground was in 1956 when Waikato beat the visiting Springboks Rugby team with over 31,000 people in attendance. In 1958, Rugby Park commenced the upgrade of a new grandstand which opened in 1959. In 1981, Rugby Park hosted part of the infamous 1981 Springbok tour where the match was cancelled due to the pitch being invaded by protesters. 1987 saw Rugby Park host its first Rugby World Cup match, Fiji v Argentina.

In 1996, the Waikato Regional Sports and Event Centre Trust were formed as it was decided that the city required a new sports stadium to attract more sports fixtures and events. The city of Hamilton announced plans to replace both Rugby Park and the city's premier cricket venue, Westpac Park, with a single large oval stadium at the Rugby Park site. However, this was reconsidered upon a funding of only NZ$270 million in funding, far short of the estimated NZ$520 million cost. It then decided instead to rebuild and modernise both stadiums on a smaller scale, reducing the total cost to NZ$30 million. In 2000, the construction of Waikato Stadium commenced, and in 2002, Waikato Stadium officially opened with a Super 12 rugby match between the Chiefs and Crusaders.

On 1 October 2015 Waikato Stadium became known as FMG Stadium Waikato after a 10-year naming rights agreement was approved.

== Facilities ==
FMG Stadium Waikato is a multi-purpose facility, though used mainly for rugby union. As many sports fields in New Zealand are multi-purpose (namely serving rugby union and cricket), the stadium is often regarded as one of the best pure rectangular stadia for football-based sporting codes in New Zealand. It is the home field of the Waikato Mitre 10 Cup team, the Chiefs team in the Super Rugby competition and, on occasion, has hosted international fixtures for the New Zealand All Blacks. It has also been the home ground for Waikato FC in New Zealand Football Championship (NZFC) and has been used for FIFA age-group World Cups. It has infrequently hosted matches for the New Zealand Warriors rugby league team in the National Rugby League (NRL) competition. The stadium also caters for private functions and events within its many different facilities. Such services include: Gallagher Lounge, Bronze Lounge, Genesis Energy Lounge, Radio Sport Lounge, Clarke Lounge, Network Lounge, Boardroom and TV Commentary Room.

== Notable events ==
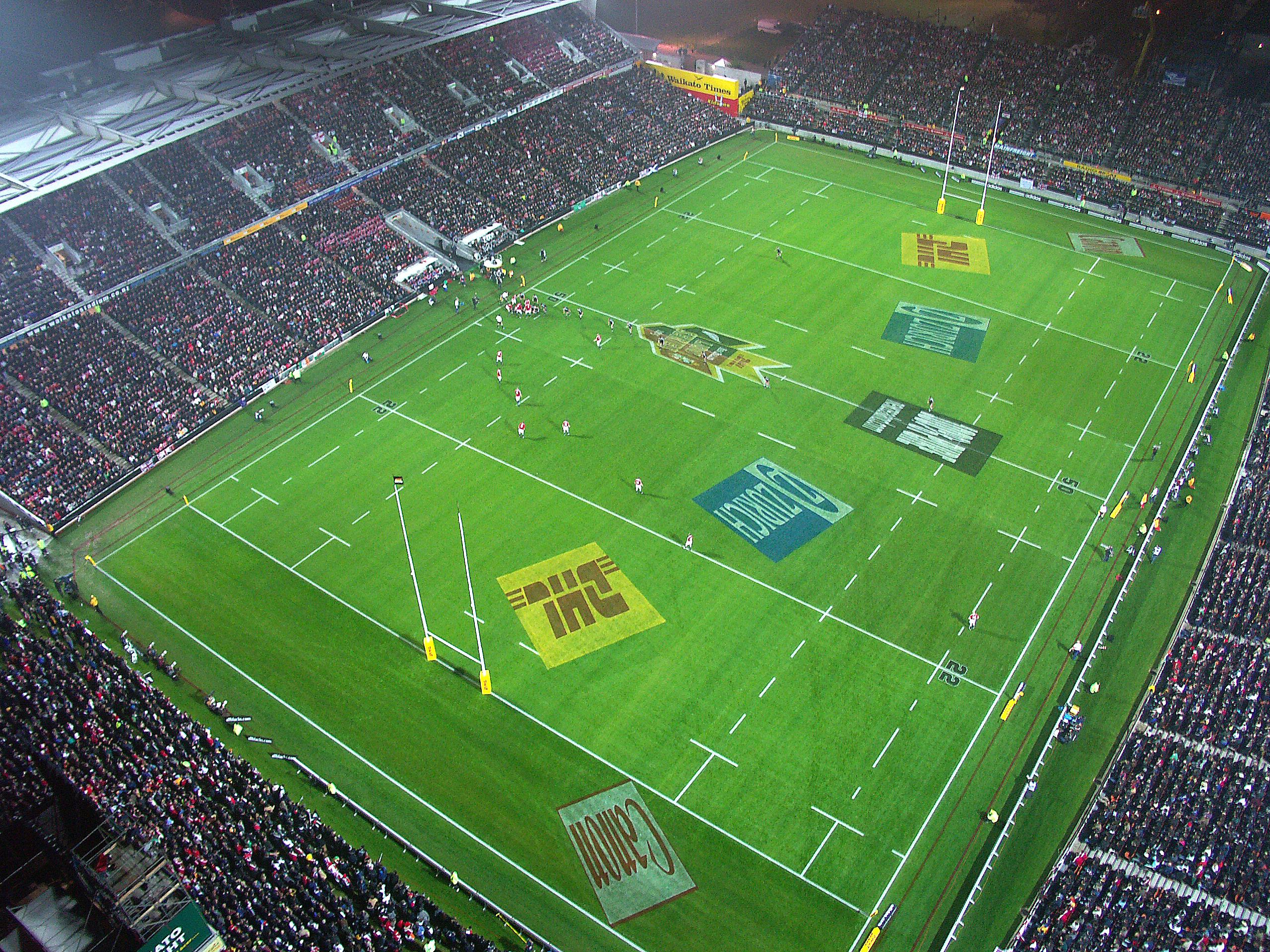
Waikato Stadium, New Zealand Māori v British & Irish Lions, 2005

FMG Stadium Waikato (then known as Rugby Park) was host to one of the matches during the 1981 Springbok Tour. However, the game against Waikato was called off in front of a full house at Rugby Park. A pitch invasion by several hundred anti-tour protestors and rumours that a light aircraft had been stolen from Taupo and was headed for Rugby Park proved too much for the authorities.

Since 2002, the stadium has been host to a variety of events ranging from sporting events to cultural events. This includes: Men’s and Women’s International rugby, Super Rugby, Mitre 10 Cup rugby, Kingz and Wellington Phoenix football, Impact World Tour, Habitat for Humanity, Summer Jam, Volcanic Paintball, Crusty Demons, WIPSEC Cultural Concert, Regional/National Marching Championship, NRL matches involving the New Zealand Warriors, Waikato FC NZFC matches, Kiwi Bowl Gridiron and International football.

On 11 June 2005, Waikato Stadium was host to a historic, first ever win by the New Zealand Māori Rugby Union Team (later renamed Māori All Blacks), over the touring British & Irish Lions.

It was one of four host stadiums of the 2008 FIFA U-17 Women's World Cup, hosting six group matches and two quarter-finals. FMG Waikato Stadium also hosted three pool matches for the Rugby World Cup 2011 – Wales vs. Samoa, Wales vs. Fiji, and New Zealand vs. Japan.

On 4 August 2012, the stadium hosted the 2012 Super Rugby Final between the Chiefs and the Sharks.

In 2017, Waikato Stadium hosted their first ever rugby league test matches with two 2017 Rugby League World Cup Group B games – Samoa vs. Tonga (18,156 spectators), and New Zealand vs. Tonga (24,041 spectators).

In 2018 New Zealand Sevens was held on the 3–4 Feb.

in 2019, the Tongan rugby league team defeated the Great Britain Lions 14–6 in the 2019 Great Britain Lions tour at the ground.

In 2023, it was used as one of the venues for the 2023 FIFA Women's World Cup, hosting five matches. Waikato Stadium was also one of two venues to host the inter-confederation play-offs.

Date	Team #1	Res.	Team #2	Stage	Attendance
21 July 2023	Zambia	0–5	Japan	Group C	16,111
25 July 2023	Switzerland	0–0	Norway	Group A	10,769
27 July 2023	Portugal	2–0	Vietnam	Group E	6,645
31 July 2023	Costa Rica	1–3	Zambia	Group C	8,117
2 August 2023	Argentina	0–2	Sweden	Group G	17,907

On 15 March 2026, Waikato Stadium will host both the men's and women's Rugby League All Stars match, a match played between Australian Aboriginal and Torres Strait and New Zealand Maori rugby league players.
