= Football at the 2024 Summer Olympics – Women's team squads =

List of footballers

The women's football tournament at the 2024 Summer Olympics was held from 25 July to 10 August 2024. The women's tournament was a full international tournament with no restrictions on age. The twelve national teams involved in the tournament were required to register a squad of 18 players, including two goalkeepers. Additionally, teams could name a maximum of four alternate players, numbered from 19 to 22. The alternative list could contain at most three outfielders, as at least one slot was reserved for a goalkeeper. In the event of serious injury during the tournament, an injured player would be able to be replaced by one of the players in the alternate list. Only players in these squads were eligible to take part in the tournament.

The final squad lists with kit numbers were published by FIFA on 11 July 2024.

The position listed for each player is per the official squad lists published by FIFA. The age listed for each player is on 25 July 2024, the first day of the tournament. The numbers of caps and goals listed for each player do not include any matches played after the start of the tournament. The club listed is the club for which the player last played a competitive match prior to the tournament. The nationality for each club reflects the national association (not the league) to which the club is affiliated. A flag is included for coaches who are of a different nationality than their own national team.

== Group A ==
=== Canada ===
Canada named a squad of 18 players and 4 alternates for the tournament on 1 July 2024. On 20 July, Sydney Collins withdrew from the squad due to injury and was replaced by Gabrielle Carle. Desiree Scott was added to the alternate list. Acting head coach: (United Kingdom) Andy Spence

No.	Pos.	Player	Date of birth (age)	Caps	Goals	Club
1	GK	Kailen Sheridan	16 July 1995 (aged 29)	50	0	(United States Soccer Federation) San Diego Wave
2	DF	Gabrielle Carle	12 October 1998 (aged 25)	46	1	(United States Soccer Federation) Washington Spirit
3	DF	Kadeisha Buchanan	5 November 1995 (aged 28)	149	6	(The Football Association) Chelsea
4	FW	Evelyne Viens	6 February 1997 (aged 27)	31	5	(Italian Football Federation) Roma
5	MF	Quinn	11 August 1995 (aged 28)	100	6	(United States Soccer Federation) Seattle Reign
6	FW	Cloé Lacasse	7 July 1993 (aged 31)	36	5	(The Football Association) Arsenal
7	MF	Julia Grosso	29 August 2000 (aged 23)	63	3	(Italian Football Federation) Juventus
8	DF	Jayde Riviere	22 January 2001 (aged 23)	45	1	(The Football Association) Manchester United
9	FW	Jordyn Huitema	8 May 2001 (aged 23)	81	21	(United States Soccer Federation) Seattle Reign
10	DF	Ashley Lawrence	11 June 1995 (aged 29)	134	8	(The Football Association) Chelsea
11	FW	Adriana Leon	2 October 1992 (aged 31)	114	40	(The Football Association) Aston Villa
12	DF	Jade Rose	12 February 2003 (aged 21)	21	0	(United States Soccer Federation) Harvard Crimson
13	MF	Simi Awujo	23 September 2003 (aged 20)	17	1	(United States Soccer Federation) USC Trojans
14	DF	Vanessa Gilles	11 March 1996 (aged 28)	41	4	(French Football Federation) Lyon
15	FW	Nichelle Prince	19 February 1995 (aged 29)	97	16	(United States Soccer Federation) Kansas City Current
16	FW	Janine Beckie	20 August 1994 (aged 29)	105	36	(United States Soccer Federation) Portland Thorns
17	MF	Jessie Fleming (captain)	11 March 1998 (aged 26)	132	19	(United States Soccer Federation) Portland Thorns
18	GK	Sabrina D'Angelo	11 May 1993 (aged 31)	16	0	(The Football Association) Arsenal
20	DF	Shelina Zadorsky	24 October 1992 (aged 31)	100	6	(The Football Association) West Ham United

Unenrolled alternate players
No.	Pos.	Player	Date of birth (age)	Caps	Goals	Club
19	FW	Deanne Rose	3 March 1999 (aged 25)	84	11	(The Football Association) Leicester City
21	DF	Desiree Scott	31 July 1987 (aged 36)	187	0	(United States Soccer Federation) Kansas City Current
22	GK	Lysianne Proulx	17 April 1999 (aged 25)	0	0	(United States Soccer Federation) Bay FC

=== Colombia ===
Colombia named a squad of 18 players and 4 alternates for the tournament on 5 July 2024.

Head coach: Ángelo Marsiglia

No.	Pos.	Player	Date of birth (age)	Caps	Goals	Club
1	GK	Catalina Pérez	8 November 1994 (aged 29)	39	0	(German Football Association) Werder Bremen
2	DF	Manuela Vanegas	9 November 2000 (aged 23)	45	9	(Royal Spanish Football Federation) Real Sociedad
3	DF	Daniela Arias	31 August 1994 (aged 29)	45	4	(Brazilian Football Confederation) Corinthians
4	DF	Daniela Caracas	25 April 1997 (aged 27)	50	0	(Royal Spanish Football Federation) Espanyol
5	DF	Yirleidis Minota	10 November 2002 (aged 21)	2	0	(Mexican Football Federation) Pachuca
6	MF	Daniela Montoya (captain)	22 August 1990 (aged 33)	92	13	(Colombian Football Federation) Atlético Nacional
7	FW	Manuela Paví	23 December 2000 (aged 23)	16	4	(Colombian Football Federation) Deportivo Cali
8	MF	Marcela Restrepo	10 November 1995 (aged 28)	27	2	(Colombian Football Federation) Atlético Nacional
9	FW	Mayra Ramírez	25 March 1999 (aged 25)	38	6	(The Football Association) Chelsea
10	MF	Leicy Santos	16 May 1996 (aged 28)	71	15	(Royal Spanish Football Federation) Atlético Madrid
11	FW	Catalina Usme	25 December 1989 (aged 34)	113	56	(Mexican Football Federation) Pachuca
12	GK	Katherine Tapia	7 December 1992 (aged 31)	8	0	(Brazilian Football Confederation) Palmeiras
13	MF	Ilana Izquierdo	14 June 2002 (aged 22)	8	0	(United States Soccer Federation) Mississippi State Bulldogs
14	DF	Ángela Barón	18 September 2003 (aged 20)	8	0	(Colombian Football Federation) Atlético Nacional
15	MF	Liana Salazar	16 September 1992 (aged 31)	30	2	(Colombian Football Federation) Millonarios
16	DF	Jorelyn Carabalí	18 May 1997 (aged 27)	42	0	(The Football Association) Brighton & Hove Albion
17	DF	Carolina Arias	2 September 1990 (aged 33)	106	0	(Colombian Football Federation) América de Cali
18	FW	Linda Caicedo	22 February 2005 (aged 19)	33	11	(Royal Spanish Football Federation) Real Madrid
22	GK	Sandra Sepúlveda	3 March 1988 (aged 36)	75	0	(Colombian Football Federation) Llaneros

Unenrolled alternate players
No.	Pos.	Player	Date of birth (age)	Caps	Goals	Club
19	MF	Wendy Bonilla	8 July 2002 (aged 22)	6	1	(Colombian Football Federation) América de Cali
20	MF	Lady Andrade	10 January 1992 (aged 32)	63	18	(Brazilian Football Confederation) Real Brasília
21	MF	María Camila Reyes	11 May 2002 (aged 22)	12	0	(Colombian Football Federation) Santa Fe

=== France ===
France named a squad of 18 players and 4 alternates for the tournament on 8 July 2024.

Head coach: Hervé Renard

No.	Pos.	Player	Date of birth (age)	Caps	Goals	Club
1	GK	Constance Picaud	5 July 1998 (aged 26)	7	0	(French Football Federation) Paris Saint-Germain
2	DF	Maëlle Lakrar	27 May 2000 (aged 24)	18	3	(French Football Federation) Montpellier
3	DF	Wendie Renard (captain)	20 July 1990 (aged 34)	160	38	(French Football Federation) Lyon
4	DF	Estelle Cascarino	5 February 1997 (aged 27)	16	1	(Italian Football Federation) Juventus
5	DF	Élisa De Almeida	11 January 1998 (aged 26)	34	4	(French Football Federation) Paris Saint-Germain
6	MF	Amandine Henry	28 September 1989 (aged 34)	106	14	(United States Soccer Federation) Utah Royals
7	DF	Sakina Karchaoui	26 January 1996 (aged 28)	75	2	(French Football Federation) Paris Saint-Germain
8	MF	Grace Geyoro	2 July 1997 (aged 27)	82	18	(French Football Federation) Paris Saint-Germain
9	FW	Eugénie Le Sommer	18 May 1989 (aged 35)	192	93	(French Football Federation) Lyon
10	FW	Delphine Cascarino	5 February 1997 (aged 27)	64	14	(French Football Federation) Lyon
11	FW	Kadidiatou Diani	1 April 1995 (aged 29)	101	29	(French Football Federation) Lyon
12	FW	Marie-Antoinette Katoto	1 November 1998 (aged 25)	41	30	(French Football Federation) Paris Saint-Germain
13	DF	Selma Bacha	9 November 2000 (aged 23)	32	2	(French Football Federation) Lyon
14	MF	Sandie Toletti	13 July 1995 (aged 29)	56	3	(Royal Spanish Football Federation) Real Madrid
15	MF	Kenza Dali	31 July 1991 (aged 32)	68	12	(The Football Association) Aston Villa
16	GK	Pauline Peyraud-Magnin	17 March 1992 (aged 32)	54	0	(Italian Football Federation) Juventus
17	FW	Sandy Baltimore	19 February 2000 (aged 24)	30	3	(French Football Federation) Paris Saint-Germain
18	DF	Griedge Mbock Bathy	26 February 1995 (aged 29)	81	8	(French Football Federation) Lyon
20	FW	Vicki Bècho	3 October 2003 (aged 20)	16	2	(French Football Federation) Lyon
21	DF	Ève Périsset	24 December 1994 (aged 29)	60	4	(The Football Association) Chelsea

Unenrolled alternate players
No.	Pos.	Player	Date of birth (age)	Caps	Goals	Club
19	MF	Léa Le Garrec	9 July 1993 (aged 31)	15	2	(French Football Federation) Fleury
22	GK	Solène Durand	20 November 1994 (aged 29)	4	0	(Italian Football Federation) Sassuolo

=== New Zealand ===
On 28 June 2024, Jitka Klimková opted to stand down from her role as head coach for the Olympics. In her absence, assistant coach Michael Mayne was appointed as acting head coach. New Zealand named a squad of 18 players and 4 alternates for the tournament on 4 July. On 24 July, Ali Riley withdrew from the squad due to injury and was replaced by Michaela Foster. Grace Neville was added to the alternate list.

Acting head coach: Michael Mayne

No.	Pos.	Player	Date of birth (age)	Caps	Goals	Club
1	GK	Anna Leat	26 June 2001 (aged 23)	19	0	(The Football Association) Aston Villa
2	DF	Kate Taylor	21 October 2003 (aged 20)	17	1	(New Zealand Football) Wellington Phoenix
3	DF	Mackenzie Barry	11 April 2001 (aged 23)	17	0	(New Zealand Football) Wellington Phoenix
4	DF	CJ Bott	22 April 1995 (aged 29)	47	3	(The Football Association) Leicester City
5	DF	Meikayla Moore	4 June 1996 (aged 28)	66	4	(Scottish Football Association) Glasgow City
6	MF	Malia Steinmetz	18 January 1999 (aged 25)	32	0	(Danish Football Association) Nordsjælland
7	DF	Michaela Foster	9 January 1999 (aged 25)	19	1	(New Zealand Football) Wellington Phoenix
8	MF	Macey Fraser	11 July 2002 (aged 22)	5	2	(United States Soccer Federation) Utah Royals
9	FW	Gabi Rennie	7 July 2001 (aged 23)	38	2	(Football Association of Finland) Åland United
10	FW	Indiah-Paige Riley	20 December 2001 (aged 22)	24	6	(Royal Dutch Football Association) PSV
11	MF	Katie Kitching	6 September 1998 (aged 25)	11	5	(The Football Association) Sunderland
12	GK	Victoria Esson	6 March 1991 (aged 33)	24	0	(Scottish Football Association) Rangers
13	DF	Rebekah Stott	17 June 1993 (aged 31)	103	4	(Football Australia) Melbourne City
14	MF	Katie Bowen	15 April 1994 (aged 30)	110	4	(Italian Football Federation) Inter Milan
15	FW	Ally Green	17 August 1998 (aged 25)	15	2	(Danish Football Association) AGF
16	FW	Jacqui Hand	19 February 1999 (aged 25)	28	8	(The Football Association) Lewes
17	FW	Milly Clegg	1 November 2005 (aged 18)	9	1	(United States Soccer Federation) Racing Louisville
18	MF	Grace Jale	10 April 1999 (aged 25)	31	9	(Football Australia) Perth Glory
20	MF	Annalie Longo	1 July 1991 (aged 33)	134	15	(New Zealand Football) Wellington Phoenix

Unenrolled alternate players
No.	Pos.	Player	Date of birth (age)	Caps	Goals	Club
19	DF	Claudia Bunge	21 September 1999 (aged 24)	31	0	(Danish Football Association) HB Køge
21	DF	Grace Neville	9 April 2000 (aged 24)	8	0	(The Football Association) London City Lionesses
22	GK	Murphy Sheaff	12 September 2003 (aged 20)	0	0	(United States Soccer Federation) Kansas State Wildcats

== Group B ==
=== Australia ===
Australia named a squad of 18 players and 4 alternates for the tournament on 4 June 2024.

Head coach: (Sweden) Tony Gustavsson

No.	Pos.	Player	Date of birth (age)	Caps	Goals	Club
1	GK	Mackenzie Arnold	25 February 1994 (aged 30)	49	0	(The Football Association) West Ham United
2	FW	Michelle Heyman	4 July 1988 (aged 36)	66	26	(Football Australia) Canberra United
3	DF	Kaitlyn Torpey	17 March 2000 (aged 24)	5	1	(United States Soccer Federation) San Diego Wave
4	DF	Clare Polkinghorne	1 February 1989 (aged 35)	167	16	(Swedish Football Association) Kristianstad
5	FW	Cortnee Vine	9 April 1998 (aged 26)	29	3	(Football Australia) Sydney FC
6	MF	Katrina Gorry	13 August 1992 (aged 31)	107	17	(The Football Association) West Ham United
7	DF	Steph Catley (interim captain)	26 January 1994 (aged 30)	126	5	(The Football Association) Arsenal
8	MF	Kyra Cooney-Cross	15 February 2002 (aged 22)	45	0	(The Football Association) Arsenal
9	FW	Caitlin Foord	11 November 1994 (aged 29)	123	36	(The Football Association) Arsenal
10	MF	Emily van Egmond	12 July 1993 (aged 31)	144	31	(United States Soccer Federation) San Diego Wave
11	MF	Mary Fowler	14 February 2003 (aged 21)	53	15	(The Football Association) Manchester City
12	DF	Ellie Carpenter	28 April 2000 (aged 24)	77	4	(French Football Federation) Lyon
13	MF	Tameka Yallop	16 June 1991 (aged 33)	123	13	(Football Australia) Brisbane Roar
14	DF	Alanna Kennedy	21 January 1995 (aged 29)	124	9	(The Football Association) Manchester City
15	DF	Clare Hunt	12 March 1999 (aged 25)	20	0	(French Football Federation) Paris Saint-Germain
16	FW	Hayley Raso	5 September 1994 (aged 29)	87	18	(Royal Spanish Football Federation) Real Madrid
17	MF	Clare Wheeler	14 January 1998 (aged 26)	21	2	(The Football Association) Everton
18	GK	Teagan Micah	20 October 1997 (aged 26)	17	0	(The Football Association) Liverpool
19	FW	Sharn Freier	24 July 2001 (aged 23)	2	0	(Football Australia) Brisbane Roar

Unenrolled alternate players
No.	Pos.	Player	Date of birth (age)	Caps	Goals	Club
20	DF	Charlotte Grant	20 September 2001 (aged 22)	25	1	(The Football Association) Tottenham Hotspur
21	DF	Courtney Nevin	12 February 2002 (aged 22)	27	0	(The Football Association) Leicester City
22	GK	Lydia Williams	13 May 1988 (aged 36)	104	0	(Football Australia) Melbourne Victory

=== Germany ===
Germany named a squad of 18 players and 4 alternates for the tournament on 3 July 2024. On 17 July, Lena Oberdorf withdrew from the squad due to injury and was replaced by Janina Minge. Pia-Sophie Wolter was added to the alternate list.

Interim head coach: Horst Hrubesch

No.	Pos.	Player	Date of birth (age)	Caps	Goals	Club
1	GK	Merle Frohms	28 January 1995 (aged 29)	52	0	(German Football Association) VfL Wolfsburg
2	DF	Sarai Linder	26 October 1999 (aged 24)	16	0	(German Football Association) TSG Hoffenheim
3	DF	Kathrin Hendrich	6 April 1992 (aged 32)	75	5	(German Football Association) VfL Wolfsburg
4	DF	Bibiane Schulze	12 November 1998 (aged 25)	4	0	(Royal Spanish Football Federation) Athletic Bilbao
5	DF	Marina Hegering	17 April 1990 (aged 34)	37	4	(German Football Association) VfL Wolfsburg
6	MF	Janina Minge	11 June 1999 (aged 25)	5	1	(German Football Association) SC Freiburg
7	FW	Lea Schüller	12 November 1997 (aged 26)	62	42	(German Football Association) Bayern Munich
8	MF	Sydney Lohmann	19 June 2000 (aged 24)	31	4	(German Football Association) Bayern Munich
9	MF	Sjoeke Nüsken	22 January 2001 (aged 23)	30	3	(The Football Association) Chelsea
10	FW	Laura Freigang	1 February 1998 (aged 26)	29	12	(German Football Association) Eintracht Frankfurt
11	FW	Alexandra Popp	6 April 1991 (aged 33)	139	67	(German Football Association) VfL Wolfsburg
12	GK	Ann-Katrin Berger	9 October 1990 (aged 33)	10	0	(United States Soccer Federation) Gotham FC
13	DF	Sara Doorsoun	17 November 1991 (aged 32)	53	1	(German Football Association) Eintracht Frankfurt
14	MF	Elisa Senß	1 October 1997 (aged 26)	7	0	(German Football Association) Bayer Leverkusen
15	DF	Giulia Gwinn	2 July 1999 (aged 25)	47	10	(German Football Association) Bayern Munich
16	MF	Jule Brand	16 October 2002 (aged 21)	47	8	(German Football Association) VfL Wolfsburg
17	FW	Klara Bühl	7 December 2000 (aged 23)	52	25	(German Football Association) Bayern Munich
18	FW	Vivien Endemann	7 August 2001 (aged 22)	6	0	(German Football Association) VfL Wolfsburg
19	DF	Felicitas Rauch	30 April 1996 (aged 28)	40	4	(United States Soccer Federation) North Carolina Courage
21	FW	Nicole Anyomi	10 February 2000 (aged 24)	25	2	(German Football Association) Eintracht Frankfurt

Unenrolled alternate players
No.	Pos.	Player	Date of birth (age)	Caps	Goals	Club
20	DF	Pia-Sophie Wolter	13 November 1997 (aged 26)	3	0	(German Football Association) Eintracht Frankfurt
22	GK	Stina Johannes	23 January 2000 (aged 24)	1	0	(German Football Association) Eintracht Frankfurt

=== United States ===
The United States named a squad of 18 players and 4 alternates for the tournament on 26 June 2024. This their first major tournament since the 2008 Summer Olympics to not feature Alex Morgan.

The numbers were announced on 3 July. On 12 July, Catarina Macario withdrew from the squad due to injury and was replaced by Lynn Williams. Emily Sams was added to the alternate list.

Head coach: (United Kingdom) Emma Hayes

No.	Pos.	Player	Date of birth (age)	Caps	Goals	Club
1	GK	Alyssa Naeher	20 April 1988 (aged 36)	106	0	(United States Soccer Federation) Chicago Red Stars
2	DF	Emily Fox	5 July 1998 (aged 26)	51	1	(The Football Association) Arsenal
3	MF	Korbin Albert	13 October 2003 (aged 20)	13	0	(French Football Federation) Paris Saint-Germain
4	DF	Naomi Girma	14 June 2000 (aged 24)	34	0	(United States Soccer Federation) San Diego Wave
5	FW	Trinity Rodman	20 May 2002 (aged 22)	40	7	(United States Soccer Federation) Washington Spirit
6	DF	Casey Krueger	23 August 1990 (aged 33)	50	0	(United States Soccer Federation) Washington Spirit
7	FW	Crystal Dunn	3 July 1992 (aged 32)	149	25	(United States Soccer Federation) Gotham FC
8	FW	Lynn Williams	21 May 1993 (aged 31)	65	18	(United States Soccer Federation) Gotham FC
9	FW	Mallory Swanson	29 April 1998 (aged 26)	94	34	(United States Soccer Federation) Chicago Red Stars
10	MF	Lindsey Horan	26 May 1994 (aged 30)	150	35	(French Football Federation) Lyon
11	FW	Sophia Smith	10 August 2000 (aged 23)	50	20	(United States Soccer Federation) Portland Thorns
12	DF	Tierna Davidson	19 September 1998 (aged 25)	60	3	(United States Soccer Federation) Gotham FC
13	DF	Jenna Nighswonger	28 November 2000 (aged 23)	10	2	(United States Soccer Federation) Gotham FC
14	MF	Emily Sonnett	25 November 1993 (aged 30)	93	2	(United States Soccer Federation) Gotham FC
15	FW	Jaedyn Shaw	20 November 2004 (aged 19)	16	7	(United States Soccer Federation) San Diego Wave
16	MF	Rose Lavelle	14 May 1995 (aged 29)	101	24	(United States Soccer Federation) Gotham FC
17	MF	Sam Coffey	31 December 1998 (aged 25)	19	1	(United States Soccer Federation) Portland Thorns
18	GK	Casey Murphy	25 April 1996 (aged 28)	19	0	(United States Soccer Federation) North Carolina Courage
20	MF	Croix Bethune	14 March 2001 (aged 23)	2	0	(United States Soccer Federation) Washington Spirit
21	DF	Emily Sams	1 July 1999 (aged 25)	0	0	(United States Soccer Federation) Orlando Pride

Unenrolled alternate players
No.	Pos.	Player	Date of birth (age)	Caps	Goals	Club
19	MF	Hal Hershfelt	3 October 2002 (aged 21)	0	0	(United States Soccer Federation) Washington Spirit
22	GK	Jane Campbell	17 February 1995 (aged 29)	8	0	(United States Soccer Federation) Houston Dash

=== Zambia ===
Zambia named a squad of 22 players for the tournament on 3 July 2024.

Head coach: Bruce Mwape

No.	Pos.	Player	Date of birth (age)	Caps	Goals	Club
1	GK	Catherine Musonda	20 February 1998 (aged 26)	3	0	(Israel Football Association) Hapoel Ra'anana
2	DF	Diana Banda	5 September 2002 (aged 21)	1	0	(Football Association of Zambia) Green Buffaloes
3	DF	Lushomo Mweemba	10 April 2001 (aged 23)	28	1	(Kazakhstan Football Federation) BIIK Shymkent
4	DF	Esther Siamfuko	8 August 2004 (aged 19)	7	0	(Football Association of Zambia) Green Buffaloes
5	DF	Pauline Zulu	3 October 2004 (aged 19)	1	0	(Football Association of Zambia) Lusaka Dynamos
6	MF	Rhoda Chileshe	8 May 1998 (aged 26)	1	1	(Football Association of Zambia) Indeni
7	MF	Misozi Zulu	11 October 1994 (aged 29)	13	0	(Turkish Football Federation) Hakkarigücü Spor
8	MF	Ochumba Lubandji	1 July 2001 (aged 23)	21	4	(Football Association of Zambia) Red Arrows
9	MF	Kabange Mupopo	21 September 1992 (aged 31)	1	0	(Football Association of Zambia) Green Buffaloes
10	MF	Grace Chanda	11 June 1997 (aged 27)	28	10	(United States Soccer Federation) Orlando Pride
11	FW	Barbra Banda	20 March 2000 (aged 24)	61	53	(United States Soccer Federation) Orlando Pride
12	MF	Avell Chitundu	30 July 1997 (aged 26)	20	3	(Football Association of Zambia) ZESCO United
13	DF	Martha Tembo	8 March 1998 (aged 26)	22	0	(Kazakhstan Football Federation) BIIK Shymkent
14	MF	Prisca Chilufya	8 June 1999 (aged 25)	0	0	(Mexican Football Federation) Juárez
15	FW	Hellen Chanda	19 June 1998 (aged 26)	1	0	(Turkish Football Federation) Hakkarigücü Spor
16	DF	Esther Muchinga	16 November 2002 (aged 21)	1	0	(Football Association of Zambia) Zanaco
17	FW	Racheal Kundananji	3 June 2000 (aged 24)	19	10	(United States Soccer Federation) Bay FC
18	GK	Ngambo Musole	26 June 1998 (aged 26)	1	0	(Football Association of Zambia) Green Buffaloes
20	FW	Racheal Nachula	14 January 1986 (aged 38)		14	(Israel Football Association) Hapoel Katamon
21	MF	Mary Wilombe	22 September 1997 (aged 26)	23	1	(Football Association of Zambia) Red Arrows

Unenrolled alternate players
No.	Pos.	Player	Date of birth (age)	Caps	Goals	Club
19	DF	Vast Phiri	3 February 1996 (aged 28)	1	0	(Football Association of Zambia) ZESCO United
22	GK	Eunice Sakala	23 May 2002 (aged 22)	0	0	(Football Association of Zambia) Nkwazi

== Group C ==
=== Brazil ===
Brazil named a squad of 18 players and 4 alternates for the tournament on 2 July 2024.

Head coach: Arthur Elias

No.	Pos.	Player	Date of birth (age)	Caps	Goals	Club
1	GK	Lorena	6 May 1997 (aged 27)	22	0	(Brazilian Football Confederation) Grêmio
2	DF	Antônia	26 April 1994 (aged 30)	40	1	(Royal Spanish Football Federation) Levante
3	DF	Tarciane	27 May 2003 (aged 21)	7	1	(United States Soccer Federation) Houston Dash
4	DF	Rafaelle Souza	18 June 1991 (aged 33)	94	9	(United States Soccer Federation) Orlando Pride
5	MF	Duda Sampaio	18 May 2001 (aged 23)	19	2	(Brazilian Football Confederation) Corinthians
6	DF	Tamires	10 October 1987 (aged 36)	148	7	(Brazilian Football Confederation) Corinthians
7	FW	Kerolin	17 November 1999 (aged 24)	37	5	(United States Soccer Federation) North Carolina Courage
8	MF	Vitória Yaya	23 January 2000 (aged 24)	7	1	(Brazilian Football Confederation) Corinthians
9	FW	Adriana	17 November 1996 (aged 27)	56	13	(United States Soccer Federation) Orlando Pride
10	FW	Marta	19 February 1986 (aged 38)	186	119	(United States Soccer Federation) Orlando Pride
11	FW	Jheniffer	6 November 2001 (aged 22)	1	0	(Brazilian Football Confederation) Corinthians
12	GK	Tainá	1 May 1995 (aged 29)	1	0	(Brazilian Football Confederation) América Mineiro
13	DF	Yasmim	28 October 1996 (aged 27)	13	3	(Brazilian Football Confederation) Corinthians
14	FW	Ludmila	1 December 1994 (aged 29)	47	6	(Royal Spanish Football Federation) Atlético Madrid
15	DF	Thaís	1 May 1996 (aged 28)	10	0	(Royal Spanish Football Federation) Tenerife
16	FW	Gabi Nunes	10 March 1997 (aged 27)	32	7	(Royal Spanish Football Federation) Levante
17	MF	Ana Vitória	6 March 2000 (aged 24)	17	2	(Royal Spanish Football Federation) Atlético Madrid
18	FW	Gabi Portilho	18 July 1995 (aged 29)	20	1	(Brazilian Football Confederation) Corinthians
19	FW	Priscila	22 August 2004 (aged 19)	5	1	(Brazilian Football Confederation) Internacional
20	MF	Angelina	26 January 2000 (aged 24)	27	1	(United States Soccer Federation) Orlando Pride
21	DF	Lauren	13 September 2002 (aged 21)	21	0	(United States Soccer Federation) Kansas City Current
22	GK	Luciana	24 July 1987 (aged 37)	44	0	(Brazilian Football Confederation) Ferroviária

=== Japan ===
Japan named a squad of 18 players and 4 alternates for the tournament on 14 June 2024.

Head coach: Futoshi Ikeda

No.	Pos.	Player	Date of birth (age)	Caps	Goals	Club
1	GK	Ayaka Yamashita	29 September 1995 (aged 28)	71	0	(Japan Football Association) INAC Kobe Leonessa
2	DF	Risa Shimizu	15 June 1996 (aged 28)	79	4	(The Football Association) West Ham United
3	DF	Moeka Minami	7 December 1998 (aged 25)	53	4	(Italian Football Federation) Roma
4	DF	Saki Kumagai (captain)	17 October 1990 (aged 33)	152	2	(Italian Football Federation) Roma
5	DF	Hana Takahashi	19 February 2000 (aged 24)	27	3	(Japan Football Association) Urawa Reds
6	DF	Tōko Koga	6 January 2006 (aged 18)	8	1	(Royal Dutch Football Association) Feyenoord
7	MF	Hinata Miyazawa	28 November 1999 (aged 24)	38	9	(The Football Association) Manchester United
8	MF	Kiko Seike	8 August 1996 (aged 27)	21	7	(Japan Football Association) Urawa Reds
9	FW	Riko Ueki	30 July 1999 (aged 24)	35	12	(The Football Association) West Ham United
10	MF	Fuka Nagano	9 March 1999 (aged 25)	40	1	(The Football Association) Liverpool
11	FW	Mina Tanaka	28 April 1994 (aged 30)	81	37	(Japan Football Association) INAC Kobe Leonessa
12	MF	Momoko Tanikawa	7 May 2005 (aged 19)	5	0	(Swedish Football Association) Rosengård
13	DF	Hikaru Kitagawa	10 May 1997 (aged 27)	11	0	(Japan Football Association) INAC Kobe Leonessa
14	MF	Yui Hasegawa	29 January 1997 (aged 27)	85	20	(The Football Association) Manchester City
15	MF	Aoba Fujino	27 January 2004 (aged 20)	23	6	(Japan Football Association) Tokyo Verdy Beleza
16	MF	Honoka Hayashi	19 May 1998 (aged 26)	33	2	(The Football Association) West Ham United
17	FW	Maika Hamano	9 May 2004 (aged 20)	10	3	(The Football Association) Chelsea
18	GK	Chika Hirao	31 December 1996 (aged 27)	8	0	(Japan Football Association) Albirex Niigata
19	FW	Remina Chiba	30 April 1999 (aged 25)	11	4	(German Football Association) Eintracht Frankfurt
20	DF	Miyabi Moriya	22 August 1996 (aged 27)	10	2	(Japan Football Association) INAC Kobe Leonessa
21	DF	Rion Ishikawa	4 July 2003 (aged 21)	8	0	(Japan Football Association) Urawa Reds
22	GK	Shu Ohba	11 July 2002 (aged 22)	1	0	(United States Soccer Federation) Ole Miss Rebels

=== Nigeria ===
Nigeria named a squad of 18 players and 4 alternates for the tournament on 3 July 2024. On 10 July, Halimatu Ayinde withdrew from the squad due to injury and was replaced by Ifeoma Onumonu. Regina Otu was added to the alternate list.

Head coach: (United States) Randy Waldrum

No.	Pos.	Player	Date of birth (age)	Caps	Goals	Club
1	GK	Tochukwu Oluehi	2 May 1987 (aged 37)			(Saudi Arabian Football Federation) Eastern Flames
2	DF	Michelle Alozie	28 April 1997 (aged 27)			(United States Soccer Federation) Houston Dash
3	DF	Osinachi Ohale	21 December 1991 (aged 32)			(Mexican Football Federation) Pachuca
4	DF	Nicole Payne	18 January 2001 (aged 23)			(United States Soccer Federation) Portland Thorns
5	DF	Chidinma Okeke	11 August 2000 (aged 23)			(Japan Football Association) Mynavi Sendai
6	FW	Esther Okoronkwo	27 March 1997 (aged 27)			(Chinese Football Association) Changchun
7	MF	Toni Payne	22 April 1995 (aged 29)			(Royal Spanish Football Federation) Sevilla
8	FW	Asisat Oshoala	9 October 1994 (aged 29)			(United States Soccer Federation) Bay FC
9	FW	Chinonyerem Macleans	1 October 1999 (aged 24)			(Russian Football Union) Lokomotiv Moscow
10	MF	Christy Ucheibe	25 December 2000 (aged 23)			(Portuguese Football Federation) Benfica
11	MF	Jennifer Echegini	22 March 2001 (aged 23)			(Italian Football Federation) Juventus
12	FW	Uchenna Kanu	20 June 1997 (aged 27)			(United States Soccer Federation) Racing Louisville
13	MF	Deborah Abiodun	2 November 2003 (aged 20)			(United States Soccer Federation) Pittsburgh Panthers
14	DF	Oluwatosin Demehin	13 March 2002 (aged 22)			(French Football Federation) Reims
15	FW	Rasheedat Ajibade	8 December 1999 (aged 24)			(Royal Spanish Football Federation) Atlético Madrid
16	GK	Chiamaka Nnadozie	8 December 2000 (aged 23)			(French Football Federation) Paris FC
17	FW	Chinwendu Ihezuo	30 April 1997 (aged 27)			(Mexican Football Federation) Pachuca
18	FW	Ifeoma Onumonu	25 February 1994 (aged 30)			(United States Soccer Federation) Utah Royals

Unenrolled alternate players
No.	Pos.	Player	Date of birth (age)	Caps	Goals	Club
19	FW	Gift Monday	9 December 2001 (aged 22)			(Royal Spanish Football Federation) Tenerife
20	DF	Jumoke Alani	17 July 2005 (aged 19)			(Nigeria Football Federation) Nasarawa Amazons
21	MF	Regina Otu	5 August 1996 (aged 27)			(French Football Federation) Saint-Étienne
22	GK	Morufa Ademola	3 May 1999 (aged 25)			(Nigeria Football Federation) Rivers Angels

=== Spain ===
Spain named a squad of 18 players and 4 alternates for the tournament on 3 July 2024.

Head coach: Montserrat Tomé

No.	Pos.	Player	Date of birth (age)	Caps	Goals	Club
1	GK	Misa Rodríguez	23 July 1999 (aged 25)	23	0	(Royal Spanish Football Federation) Real Madrid
2	DF	Ona Batlle	10 June 1999 (aged 25)	48	2	(Royal Spanish Football Federation) Barcelona
3	MF	Teresa Abelleira	9 January 2000 (aged 24)	33	3	(Royal Spanish Football Federation) Real Madrid
4	DF	Irene Paredes (captain)	4 July 1991 (aged 33)	107	12	(Royal Spanish Football Federation) Barcelona
5	DF	Oihane Hernández	4 May 2000 (aged 24)	23	1	(Royal Spanish Football Federation) Real Madrid
6	MF	Aitana Bonmatí	18 January 1998 (aged 26)	64	25	(Royal Spanish Football Federation) Barcelona
7	MF	Athenea del Castillo	24 October 2000 (aged 23)	45	12	(Royal Spanish Football Federation) Real Madrid
8	FW	Mariona Caldentey	19 March 1996 (aged 28)	73	26	(Royal Spanish Football Federation) Barcelona
9	FW	Salma Paralluelo	13 November 2003 (aged 20)	26	12	(Royal Spanish Football Federation) Barcelona
10	FW	Jenni Hermoso	9 May 1990 (aged 34)	117	56	(Mexican Football Federation) Tigres UANL
11	MF	Alexia Putellas	4 February 1994 (aged 30)	119	30	(Royal Spanish Football Federation) Barcelona
12	MF	Patricia Guijarro	17 May 1998 (aged 26)	54	11	(Royal Spanish Football Federation) Barcelona
13	GK	Cata Coll	23 April 2001 (aged 23)	12	0	(Royal Spanish Football Federation) Barcelona
14	DF	Laia Aleixandri	25 August 2000 (aged 23)	29	2	(The Football Association) Manchester City
15	MF	Eva Navarro	27 January 2001 (aged 23)	23	5	(Royal Spanish Football Federation) Atlético Madrid
16	DF	Laia Codina	22 January 2000 (aged 24)	15	2	(The Football Association) Arsenal
17	FW	Lucía García	14 July 1998 (aged 26)	48	11	(The Football Association) Manchester United
18	DF	Olga Carmona	12 June 2000 (aged 24)	42	3	(Royal Spanish Football Federation) Real Madrid
19	MF	Vicky López	26 July 2006 (aged 17)	4	0	(Royal Spanish Football Federation) Barcelona
20	DF	María Méndez	10 April 2001 (aged 23)	8	2	(Royal Spanish Football Federation) Levante
21	FW	Alba Redondo	27 August 1996 (aged 27)	37	14	(Royal Spanish Football Federation) Levante
22	GK	Elene Lete	7 May 2002 (aged 22)	1	0	(Royal Spanish Football Federation) Real Sociedad
