= Football at the 2024 Summer Olympics – Women's tournament – Group B =

Group B of the women's football tournament at the 2024 Summer Olympics was played from 25 to 31 July 2024. The group, one of three 4-team groups competing in the group stage of the Olympic tournament, consisted of Australia, Germany, the United States and Zambia. The top two teams, the United States and Germany, advanced to the knockout stage.

== Teams ==
Draw position	Team	Pot	Confederation	Method of qualification	Date of qualification	Olympic appearance	Last appearance	Previous best performance
B1	United States	1	CONCACAF	2022 CONCACAF W Championship winner	18 July 2022	8th	2020	Gold medalists (1996, 2004, 2008, 2012)
B2	Zambia	4	CAF	2024 CAF Women's Olympic qualifying tournament top two	10 April 2024	2nd	2020	Ninth place (2020)
B3	Germany	2	UEFA	2024 UEFA Women's Nations League Finals top two	28 February 2024	6th	2016	Gold medalists (2016)
B4	Australia	3	AFC	2024 AFC Women's Olympic Qualifying Tournament top two	28 February 2024	5th	2020	Fourth place (2020)

== Standings ==
Pos	Team	Pld	W	D	L	GF	GA	GD	Pts	Qualification
1	United States	3	3	0	0	9	2	+7	9	Advance to knockout stage
2	Germany	3	2	0	1	8	5	+3	6	Advance to knockout stage
3	Australia	3	1	0	2	7	10	−3	3	
4	Zambia	3	0	0	3	6	13	−7	0	

Source: FIFA
Rules for classification: Group stage tiebreakers

In the quarter-finals:

- The winners of Group B, the United States, advanced to play the runners-up of Group C, Japan.
- The runners-up of Group B, Germany, advanced to play the runners-up of Group A, Canada.

== Matches ==
=== Germany vs Australia ===
25 July 2024
19:00

Germany	3–0	Australia
Hegering 24'; Schüller 64'; Brand 68'	Report

Stade de Marseille, Marseille
Attendance: 9,731
Referee: Katia García (Mexico)

Germany	Australia

GK	12	Ann-Katrin Berger
RB	15	Giulia Gwinn
CB	3	Kathrin Hendrich
CB	5	Marina Hegering		(substituted off) 73'
LB	2	Sarai Linder
DM	9	Sjoeke Nüsken		(substituted off) 46'
RM	16	Jule Brand
CM	6	Janina Minge	(yellow card) 45+1'	(substituted off) 73'
LM	17	Klara Bühl		(substituted off) 89'
CF	11	Alexandra Popp (c)
CF	7	Lea Schüller
Substitutes:
GK	1	Merle Frohms
DF	4	Bibiane Schulze		(substituted on) 73'
DF	13	Sara Doorsoun
MF	8	Sydney Lohmann		(substituted on) 46'
MF	14	Elisa Senß		(substituted on) 73'
FW	10	Laura Freigang
FW	18	Vivien Endemann		(substituted on) 89'
Interim manager:
Horst Hrubesch

GK	1	Mackenzie Arnold
RB	12	Ellie Carpenter
CB	14	Alanna Kennedy
CB	15	Clare Hunt
LB	7	Steph Catley (c)		(substituted off) 77'
RM	5	Cortnee Vine		(substituted off) 59'
CM	8	Kyra Cooney-Cross
CM	6	Katrina Gorry		(substituted off) 59'
LM	11	Mary Fowler
CF	16	Hayley Raso		(substituted off) 77'
CF	9	Caitlin Foord	(yellow card) 22'	(substituted off) 77'
Substitutes:
GK	18	Teagan Micah
DF	3	Kaitlyn Torpey		(substituted on) 77'
DF	4	Clare Polkinghorne
MF	10	Emily van Egmond		(substituted on) 77'
MF	17	Clare Wheeler		(substituted on) 59'
FW	2	Michelle Heyman		(substituted on) 77'
FW	19	Sharn Freier		(substituted on) 59'
Manager:
(Sweden) Tony Gustavsson

Assistant referees:
Sandra Ramírez (Mexico)
Karen Díaz (Mexico)
Fourth official:
Anahí Fernández (Uruguay)
Video assistant referee:
Carlos del Cerro Grande (Spain)
Assistant video assistant referee:
Sivakorn Pu-udom (Thailand)

=== United States vs Zambia ===
25 July 2024
21:00

United States	3–0	Zambia
Rodman 17'; Swanson 24', 25'	Report

Stade de Nice, Nice
Attendance: 5,550
Referee: Ramon Abatti (Brazil)

United States	Zambia

GK	1	Alyssa Naeher
RB	2	Emily Fox
CB	4	Naomi Girma
CB	12	Tierna Davidson
LB	7	Crystal Dunn
DM	17	Sam Coffey
CM	10	Lindsey Horan (c)		(substituted off) 65'
CM	16	Rose Lavelle		(substituted off) 46'
RF	5	Trinity Rodman	(yellow card) 44'	(substituted off) 65'
CF	9	Mallory Swanson		(substituted off) 65'
LF	11	Sophia Smith		(substituted off) 43'
Substitutes:
GK	18	Casey Murphy
DF	6	Casey Krueger		(substituted on) 65'
DF	13	Jenna Nighswonger		(substituted on) 65'
MF	3	Korbin Albert		(substituted on) 46'
MF	14	Emily Sonnett		(substituted on) 65'
MF	20	Croix Bethune
FW	8	Lynn Williams		(substituted on) 43'
Manager:
(United Kingdom) Emma Hayes

GK	18	Ngambo Musole
RB	4	Esther Siamfuko
CB	5	Pauline Zulu	(red card) 34'
CB	3	Lushomo Mweemba
LB	13	Martha Tembo	(yellow card) 45'
CM	14	Prisca Chilufya		(substituted off) 37'
CM	9	Kabange Mupopo
CM	10	Grace Chanda		(substituted off) 37'
RF	15	Hellen Chanda
CF	11	Barbra Banda (c)
LF	17	Racheal Kundananji
Substitutes:
GK	1	Catherine Musonda
DF	2	Diana Banda
MF	6	Rhoda Chileshe
MF	7	Misozi Zulu
MF	8	Ochumba Lubandji
MF	12	Avell Chitundu		(substituted on) 37'
DF	16	Esther Muchinga		(substituted on) 37'
Manager:
Bruce Mwape

Assistant referees:
Rafael Alves (Brazil)
Guillerme Camilo (Brazil)
Fourth official:
Veronika Bernatskaia (Kyrgyzstan)
Video assistant referee:
Daiane Muniz (Brazil)
Assistant video assistant referee:
Rodrigo Carvajal (Chile)

=== Australia vs Zambia ===
28 July 2024
19:00

Australia	6–5	Zambia
Kennedy 7'; Raso 35'; Musole 58' (o.g.); Catley 65', 78' (pen.); Heyman 90'	Report	B. Banda 1', 33', 45+2'; Kundananji 21', 56'

Stade de Nice, Nice
Attendance: 4,441
Referee: Emikar Calderas (Venezuela)

Australia	Zambia

GK	1	Mackenzie Arnold
RB	12	Ellie Carpenter
CB	14	Alanna Kennedy	(yellow card) 87'
CB	15	Clare Hunt
LB	7	Steph Catley (c)
CM	8	Kyra Cooney-Cross
CM	10	Emily van Egmond		(substituted off) 57'
CM	6	Katrina Gorry		(substituted off) 57'
RF	16	Hayley Raso		(substituted off) 57'
CF	11	Mary Fowler
LF	9	Caitlin Foord
Substitutes:
GK	18	Teagan Micah
DF	3	Kaitlyn Torpey		(substituted on) 57'
DF	4	Clare Polkinghorne
MF	13	Tameka Yallop
MF	17	Clare Wheeler		(substituted on) 57'
FW	2	Michelle Heyman		(substituted on) 57'
FW	5	Cortnee Vine
Manager:
(Sweden) Tony Gustavsson

GK	18	Ngambo Musole
RB	4	Esther Siamfuko
CB	16	Esther Muchinga	(yellow card) 77'
CB	3	Lushomo Mweemba
LB	13	Martha Tembo
RM	15	Hellen Chanda
CM	9	Kabange Mupopo		(substituted off) 83'
LM	17	Racheal Kundananji
AM	20	Racheal Nachula		(substituted off) 83'
AM	7	Misozi Zulu		(substituted off) 66'
CF	11	Barbra Banda (c)
Substitutes:
GK	1	Catherine Musonda
DF	2	Diana Banda
MF	6	Rhoda Chileshe		(substituted on) 66'
MF	8	Ochumba Lubandji
MF	12	Avell Chitundu		(substituted on) 83'
MF	14	Prisca Chilufya		(substituted on) 83'
Manager:
Bruce Mwape

Assistant referees:
Migdalia Rodríguez (Venezuela)
Mary Blanco (Colombia)
Fourth official:
Veronika Bernatskaia (Kyrgyzstan)
Video assistant referee:
Leodán González (Uruguay)
Assistant video assistant referee:
Héctor Paletta (Argentina)

=== United States vs Germany ===
28 July 2024
21:00

United States	4–1	Germany
Smith 11', 44'; Swanson 26'; Williams 89'	Report	Gwinn 22'

Stade de Marseille, Marseille
Attendance: 12,845
Referee: Yael Falcón (Argentina)

United States	Germany

GK	1	Alyssa Naeher
RB	2	Emily Fox		(substituted off) 90+2'
CB	4	Naomi Girma
CB	12	Tierna Davidson		(substituted off) 44'
LB	7	Crystal Dunn
DM	17	Sam Coffey	(yellow card) 22'
CM	10	Lindsey Horan (c)
CM	16	Rose Lavelle
RF	5	Trinity Rodman		(substituted off) 90+2'
CF	9	Mallory Swanson
LF	11	Sophia Smith		(substituted off) 85'
Substitutes:
GK	18	Casey Murphy
DF	6	Casey Krueger		(substituted on) 90+2'
DF	13	Jenna Nighswonger		(substituted on) 90+2'
MF	3	Korbin Albert
MF	14	Emily Sonnett		(substituted on) 44'
MF	20	Croix Bethune
FW	8	Lynn Williams		(substituted on) 85'
Manager:
(United Kingdom) Emma Hayes

GK	12	Ann-Katrin Berger
RB	15	Giulia Gwinn
CB	3	Kathrin Hendrich	(yellow card) 18'
CB	5	Marina Hegering
LB	19	Felicitas Rauch
DM	9	Sjoeke Nüsken		(substituted off) 68'
RM	16	Jule Brand
CM	6	Janina Minge
LM	17	Klara Bühl
CF	11	Alexandra Popp (c)		(substituted off) 77'
CF	7	Lea Schüller
Substitutes:
GK	1	Merle Frohms
DF	4	Bibiane Schulze
DF	13	Sara Doorsoun
MF	8	Sydney Lohmann		(substituted on) 68'
MF	14	Elisa Senß		(substituted on) 77'
FW	10	Laura Freigang
FW	18	Vivien Endemann
Interim manager:
Horst Hrubesch

Assistant referees:
Maximiliano Del Yesso (Argentina)
Facundo Rodríguez (Argentina)
Fourth official:
Anahí Fernández (Uruguay)
Video assistant referee:
Tatiana Guzmán (Nicaragua)
Assistant video assistant referee:
Katalin Kulcsár (Hungary)

=== Australia vs United States ===
31 July 2024
19:00

Australia	1–2	United States
Kennedy 90+2'	Report	Rodman 43'; Albert 77'

Stade de Marseille, Marseille
Attendance: 13,036
Referee: François Letexier (France)

Australia	United States

GK	1	Mackenzie Arnold
RB	12	Ellie Carpenter
CB	14	Alanna Kennedy
CB	15	Clare Hunt
LB	7	Steph Catley (c)
DM	3	Kaitlyn Torpey		(substituted off) 59'
CM	8	Kyra Cooney-Cross		(substituted off) 46'
CM	6	Katrina Gorry		(substituted off) 59'
RF	16	Hayley Raso		(substituted off) 85'
CF	11	Mary Fowler
LF	9	Caitlin Foord
Substitutes:
GK	18	Teagan Micah
DF	4	Clare Polkinghorne
MF	10	Emily van Egmond		(substituted on) 59'
MF	13	Tameka Yallop		(substituted on) 85'
MF	17	Clare Wheeler		(substituted on) 46'
FW	2	Michelle Heyman		(substituted on) 59'
FW	5	Cortnee Vine
Manager:
(Sweden) Tony Gustavsson			(yellow card) 45+1'

GK	1	Alyssa Naeher
RB	2	Emily Fox		(substituted off) 65'
CB	4	Naomi Girma
CB	14	Emily Sonnett
LB	7	Crystal Dunn		(substituted off) 46'
DM	17	Sam Coffey	(yellow card) 3'
CM	10	Lindsey Horan (c)
CM	16	Rose Lavelle		(substituted off) 65'
RF	5	Trinity Rodman		(substituted off) 65'
CF	9	Mallory Swanson		(substituted off) 80'
LF	11	Sophia Smith
Substitutes:
GK	18	Casey Murphy
DF	6	Casey Krueger		(substituted on) 65'
DF	13	Jenna Nighswonger		(substituted on) 46'
DF	21	Emily Sams
MF	3	Korbin Albert	(yellow card) 67'	(substituted on) 65'
MF	20	Croix Bethune		(substituted on) 80'
FW	8	Lynn Williams		(substituted on) 65'
Manager:
(United Kingdom) Emma Hayes

Assistant referees:
Cyril Mugnier (France)
Mehdi Rahmouni (France)
Fourth official:
Anahí Fernández (Uruguay)
Video assistant referee:
Jérôme Brisard (France)
Assistant video assistant referee:
Carlos del Cerro Grande (Spain)

=== Zambia vs Germany ===
31 July 2024
19:00

Zambia	1–4	Germany
B. Banda 49'	Report	Schüller 10', 61'; Bühl 47'; Senß 90+5'

Stade Geoffroy-Guichard, Saint-Étienne
Attendance: 2,642
Referee: Yoshimi Yamashita (Japan)

Zambia	Germany

GK	18	Ngambo Musole
RB	4	Esther Siamfuko
CB	5	Pauline Zulu
CB	3	Lushomo Mweemba
LB	13	Martha Tembo
RM	15	Hellen Chanda	(yellow card) 35'	(substituted off) 65'
CM	9	Kabange Mupopo
LM	17	Racheal Kundananji
AM	20	Racheal Nachula		(substituted off) 46'
AM	8	Ochumba Lubandji
CF	11	Barbra Banda (c)
Substitutes:
GK	1	Catherine Musonda
DF	2	Diana Banda
DF	16	Esther Muchinga
MF	6	Rhoda Chileshe
MF	12	Avell Chitundu
MF	14	Prisca Chilufya		(substituted on) 46'
MF	21	Mary Wilombe		(substituted on) 65'
Manager:
Bruce Mwape

GK	12	Ann-Katrin Berger
RB	15	Giulia Gwinn
CB	3	Kathrin Hendrich	(substituted off) 22'
CB	4	Bibiane Schulze
LB	19	Felicitas Rauch
DM	9	Sjoeke Nüsken	(substituted off) 89'
RM	16	Jule Brand	(substituted off) 46'
CM	6	Janina Minge
LM	17	Klara Bühl
CF	11	Alexandra Popp (c)	(substituted off) 69'
CF	7	Lea Schüller	(substituted off) 69'
Substitutes:
GK	1	Merle Frohms
DF	13	Sara Doorsoun	(substituted on) 22'
FW	18	Vivien Endemann	(substituted on) 46'
FW	10	Laura Freigang	(substituted on) 69'
MF	8	Sydney Lohmann	(substituted on) 69'
MF	14	Elisa Senß	(substituted on) 89'
Interim manager:
Horst Hrubesch

Assistant referees:
Makoto Bozono (Japan)
Naomi Teshirogi (Japan)
Fourth official:
Frida Klarlund (Denmark)
Video assistant referee:
Ivan Bebek (Croatia)
Assistant video assistant referee:
Mahmoud Ashour (Egypt)

== Discipline ==
Fair play points would have been used as a tiebreaker if the overall and head-to-head records of teams were tied. These were calculated based on yellow and red cards received in all group matches as follows:

- first yellow card: minus 1 point;
- indirect red card (second yellow card): minus 3 points;
- direct red card: minus 4 points;
- yellow card and direct red card: minus 5 points;

Only one of the above deductions could be applied to a player in a single match.

Team	Match 1				Match 2				Match 3				Points
Team	Booked	(yellow card) (yellow-red card)	Sent off (straight red)	(yellow card) (red card)	Booked	(yellow card) (yellow-red card)	Sent off (straight red)	(yellow card) (red card)	Booked	(yellow card) (yellow-red card)	Sent off (straight red)	(yellow card) (red card)	Points
Germany	1				1								–2
Australia	1				1				1				–3
United States	1				1				2				–4
Zambia	1		1		1				1				–7
