= Football at the 2020 Summer Olympics – Women's team squads =

The women's football tournament at the 2020 Summer Olympics in Tokyo, Japan was held from 21 July to 6 August 2021. The women's tournament was a full international tournament with no restrictions on age. The twelve national teams involved in the tournament were required to register a squad of 18 players, including two goalkeepers. Additionally, teams could name a maximum of four alternate players, numbered from 19 to 22. The alternate list could contain at most three outfielders, as at least one slot was reserved for a goalkeeper. In the event of serious injury during the tournament, an injured player would be able to be replaced by one of the players in the alternate list. Only players in these squads were planned to be eligible to take part in the tournament. On 2 July, FIFA confirmed that there was a change for the 2020 Olympics, allowing all 22 players named to be available on the roster, with 18 being named for each match. This change was implemented due to the challenges of the COVID-19 pandemic. The official squad lists were released by FIFA on 7 July 2021, with the athletes originally named as alternates assigned the numbers 19 through 22. The IOC also confirmed that a player must appear on at least one 18-player matchday roster to be considered an Olympian and to receive a medal.

The position listed for each player is per the official squad lists published by FIFA. The age listed for each player is on 21 July 2021, the first day of the tournament. The numbers of caps and goals listed for each player do not include any matches played after the start of the tournament. The club listed is the club for which the player last played a competitive match prior to the tournament. The nationality for each club reflects the national association (not the league) to which the club is affiliated. A flag is included for coaches who are of a different nationality than their own national team.

== Group E ==
=== Canada ===
The final squad of 18 athletes and four alternates was announced on 23 June 2021. Those listed with numbers 19 to 22 were the alternates.

Head coach: (United Kingdom) Bev Priestman

No.	Pos.	Player	Date of birth (age)	Caps	Goals	Club
1	GK	Stephanie Labbé	10 October 1986 (aged 34)	73	0	(Swedish Football Association) Rosengård
2	DF	Allysha Chapman	25 January 1989 (aged 32)	79	1	(United States Soccer Federation) Houston Dash
3	DF	Kadeisha Buchanan	5 November 1995 (aged 25)	103	4	(French Football Federation) Lyon
4	DF	Shelina Zadorsky	24 October 1992 (aged 28)	72	2	(The Football Association) Tottenham Hotspur
5	MF	Quinn	11 August 1995 (aged 25)	63	5	(United States Soccer Federation) OL Reign
6	FW	Deanne Rose	3 March 1999 (aged 22)	55	10	(United States Soccer Federation) Florida Gators
7	MF	Julia Grosso	29 August 2000 (aged 20)	24	0	(United States Soccer Federation) Texas Longhorns
8	DF	Jayde Riviere	22 January 2001 (aged 20)	21	1	(United States Soccer Federation) Michigan Wolverines
9	FW	Adriana Leon	2 October 1992 (aged 28)	71	19	(The Football Association) West Ham United
10	DF	Ashley Lawrence	11 June 1995 (aged 26)	95	7	(French Football Federation) Paris Saint-Germain
11	MF	Desiree Scott	31 July 1987 (aged 33)	161	0	(United States Soccer Federation) Kansas City
12	FW	Christine Sinclair (captain)	12 June 1983 (aged 38)	299	186	(United States Soccer Federation) Portland Thorns
13	FW	Évelyne Viens	6 February 1997 (aged 24)	7	2	(United States Soccer Federation) NJ/NY Gotham
14	DF	Vanessa Gilles	11 March 1996 (aged 25)	8	0	(French Football Federation) Bordeaux
15	FW	Nichelle Prince	19 February 1995 (aged 26)	66	12	(United States Soccer Federation) Houston Dash
16	FW	Janine Beckie	20 August 1994 (aged 26)	75	31	(The Football Association) Manchester City
17	MF	Jessie Fleming	11 March 1998 (aged 23)	84	11	(The Football Association) Chelsea
18	GK	Kailen Sheridan	16 July 1995 (aged 26)	10	0	(United States Soccer Federation) NJ/NY Gotham
19	FW	Jordyn Huitema	8 May 2001 (aged 20)	37	13	(French Football Federation) Paris Saint-Germain
20	MF	Sophie Schmidt	28 June 1988 (aged 33)	205	19	(United States Soccer Federation) Houston Dash
21	DF	Gabrielle Carle	12 October 1998 (aged 22)	25	1	(United States Soccer Federation) Florida State Seminoles
22	GK	Erin McLeod	26 February 1983 (aged 38)	118	0	(United States Soccer Federation) Orlando Pride

=== Chile ===
The final squad of 22 athletes was announced on 2 July 2021.

Head coach: José Letelier

No.	Pos.	Player	Date of birth (age)	Caps	Goals	Club
1	GK	Christiane Endler (captain)	23 July 1991 (aged 29)	80	0	(French Football Federation) Paris Saint-Germain
2	MF	Yastin Jiménez	17 October 2000 (aged 20)	2	0	(Football Federation of Chile) Colo-Colo
3	DF	Carla Guerrero	23 December 1987 (aged 33)	71	5	(Football Federation of Chile) Universidad de Chile
4	DF	Francisca Lara	29 July 1990 (aged 30)	71	20	(French Football Federation) Le Havre
5	DF	Fernanda Ramírez	30 August 1992 (aged 28)	1	0	(Football Federation of Chile) Universidad de Chile
6	DF	Nayadet López	5 August 1994 (aged 26)	4	0	(Royal Spanish Football Federation) Santa Teresa
7	FW	Yenny Acuña	18 May 1997 (aged 24)	3	0	(Football Federation of Chile) Santiago Morning
8	MF	Karen Araya	16 October 1990 (aged 30)	67	7	(Football Federation of Chile) Santiago Morning
9	FW	María José Urrutia	17 December 1993 (aged 27)	22	2	(Football Federation of Chile) Colo-Colo
10	FW	Yanara Aedo	5 August 1993 (aged 27)	70	10	(Royal Spanish Football Federation) Rayo Vallecano
11	MF	Yessenia López	20 October 1990 (aged 30)	40	5	(Football Federation of Chile) Universidad de Chile
12	GK	Natalia Campos	12 January 1992 (aged 29)	9	0	(Football Federation of Chile) Universidad de Chile
13	DF	Fernanda Pinilla	6 November 1993 (aged 27)	19	0	(Football Federation of Chile) Universidad de Chile
14	MF	Daniela Pardo	9 May 1988 (aged 33)	35	3	(Football Federation of Chile) Santiago Morning
15	FW	Daniela Zamora	13 November 1990 (aged 30)	51	5	(Swedish Football Association) Djurgårdens IF
16	DF	Rosario Balmaceda	26 March 1999 (aged 22)	17	0	(Football Federation of Chile) Santiago Morning
17	DF	Javiera Toro	22 April 1998 (aged 23)	17	0	(Royal Spanish Football Federation) Sevilla
18	DF	Camila Sáez	17 October 1994 (aged 26)	62	8	(Royal Spanish Football Federation) Rayo Vallecano
19	FW	Javiera Grez	11 July 2000 (aged 21)	14	2	(Football Federation of Chile) Colo-Colo
20	MF	Francisca Mardones	24 March 1989 (aged 32)	39	1	(Football Federation of Chile) Santiago Morning
21	DF	Valentina Díaz	30 March 2001 (aged 20)	4	0	(Football Federation of Chile) Colo-Colo
22	GK	Antonia Canales	16 October 2002 (aged 18)	0	0	(Football Federation of Chile) Universidad Católica

=== Great Britain ===
The final squad of 22 athletes was originally announced on 27 May 2021. Before the tournament, Carly Telford replaced the injured Karen Bardsley on 18 June 2021.

Head coach: (Norway) Hege Riise

No.	Pos.	Player	Date of birth (age)	Caps	Goals	Club
1	GK	(England) Ellie Roebuck	23 September 1999 (aged 21)	0	0	(The Football Association) Manchester City
2	DF	(England) Lucy Bronze	28 October 1991 (aged 29)	0	0	(The Football Association) Manchester City
3	DF	(England) Demi Stokes	12 December 1991 (aged 29)	0	0	(The Football Association) Manchester City
4	MF	(England) Keira Walsh	8 April 1997 (aged 24)	0	0	(The Football Association) Manchester City
5	DF	(England) Steph Houghton	23 April 1988 (aged 33)	5	3	(The Football Association) Manchester City
6	MF	(Wales) Sophie Ingle	2 September 1991 (aged 29)	0	0	(The Football Association) Chelsea
7	FW	(England) Nikita Parris	10 March 1994 (aged 27)	0	0	(French Football Federation) Lyon
8	MF	(Scotland) Kim Little	29 June 1990 (aged 31)	5	0	(The Football Association) Arsenal
9	FW	(England) Ellen White	9 May 1989 (aged 32)	4	0	(The Football Association) Manchester City
10	MF	(England) Fran Kirby	29 June 1993 (aged 28)	0	0	(The Football Association) Chelsea
11	MF	(Scotland) Caroline Weir	20 June 1995 (aged 26)	0	0	(The Football Association) Manchester City
12	DF	(England) Rachel Daly	6 December 1991 (aged 29)	0	0	(United States Soccer Federation) Houston Dash
13	GK	(England) Carly Telford	7 July 1987 (aged 34)	0	0	(The Football Association) Chelsea
14	DF	(England) Millie Bright	21 August 1993 (aged 27)	0	0	(The Football Association) Chelsea
15	FW	(England) Lauren Hemp	7 August 2000 (aged 20)	0	0	(The Football Association) Manchester City
16	DF	(England) Leah Williamson	29 March 1997 (aged 24)	0	0	(The Football Association) Arsenal
17	MF	(England) Georgia Stanway	3 January 1999 (aged 22)	0	0	(The Football Association) Manchester City
18	MF	(England) Jill Scott	2 February 1987 (aged 34)	5	1	(The Football Association) Everton
19	DF	(England) Niamh Charles	21 June 1999 (aged 22)	0	0	(The Football Association) Chelsea
20	FW	(England) Ella Toone	2 September 1999 (aged 21)	0	0	(The Football Association) Manchester United
21	DF	(England) Lotte Wubben-Moy	11 January 1999 (aged 22)	0	0	(The Football Association) Arsenal
22	GK	(England) (Scotland) Sandy MacIver (Note: Sandy MacIver had represented the England senior team once in a friendly at the time of the 2020 Olympics. She subsequently switched to the Scotland national team in October 2023.)	18 June 1998 (aged 23)	0	0	(The Football Association) Everton

=== Japan ===
The final squad of 22 athletes was announced on 18 June 2021.

Head coach: Asako Takakura

No.	Pos.	Player	Date of birth (age)	Caps	Goals	Club
1	GK	Sakiko Ikeda	8 September 1992 (age 34)	18	0	(Japan Football Association) Urawa Reds
2	DF	Risa Shimizu	15 June 1996 (age 30)	37	1	(Japan Football Association) Nippon TV Tokyo Verdy Beleza
3	DF	Saori Takarada	27 December 1999 (age 26)	7	1	(United States Soccer Federation) Washington Spirit
4	DF	Saki Kumagai (captain)	17 October 1990 (age 36)	114	1	(French Football Federation) Lyon
5	DF	Moeka Minami	7 December 1998 (age 27)	15	1	(Japan Football Association) Urawa Reds
6	MF	Hina Sugita	31 January 1997 (age 29)	23	2	(Japan Football Association) INAC Kobe Leonessa
7	MF	Emi Nakajima	27 September 1990 (age 36)	85	14	(Japan Football Association) INAC Kobe Leonessa
8	MF	Narumi Miura	3 July 1997 (age 29)	24	1	(Japan Football Association) Nippon TV Tokyo Verdy Beleza
9	FW	Yuika Sugasawa	5 October 1990 (age 36)	75	24	(Japan Football Association) Urawa Reds
10	FW	Mana Iwabuchi	18 March 1993 (age 33)	77	35	(The Football Association) Aston Villa
11	FW	Mina Tanaka	28 April 1994 (age 32)	47	23	(Japan Football Association) INAC Kobe Leonessa
12	FW	Jun Endo	24 May 2000 (age 26)	17	1	(Japan Football Association) Nippon TV Tokyo Verdy Beleza
13	MF	Yuzuho Shiokoshi	1 November 1997 (age 29)	3	2	(Japan Football Association) Urawa Reds
14	MF	Yui Hasegawa	29 January 1997 (age 29)	46	11	(Italian Football Federation) Milan
15	FW	Yuka Momiki	9 April 1996 (age 30)	38	14	(United States Soccer Federation) OL Reign
16	DF	Asato Miyagawa	24 February 1998 (age 28)	14	0	(Japan Football Association) Nippon TV Tokyo Verdy Beleza
17	DF	Nanami Kitamura	25 November 1999 (age 26)	3	0	(Japan Football Association) Nippon TV Tokyo Verdy Beleza
18	GK	Ayaka Yamashita	29 September 1995 (age 31)	40	0	(Japan Football Association) Nippon TV Tokyo Verdy Beleza
19	DF	Shiori Miyake	13 October 1995 (age 31)	25	0	(Japan Football Association) INAC Kobe Leonessa
20	MF	Honoka Hayashi	19 May 1998 (age 28)	6	0	(Swedish Football Association) AIK
21	MF	Momoka Kinoshita	2 March 2003 (age 23)	4	1	(Japan Football Association) Nippon TV Tokyo Verdy Beleza
22	GK	Chika Hirao	31 December 1996 (age 29)	2	0	(Japan Football Association) Albirex Niigata

== Group F ==
=== Brazil ===
The final squad of 22 athletes was announced on 18 June 2021. On 2 July 2021, Adriana withdrew from the squad due to injury and was replaced by Angelina.

Head coach: (Sweden) Pia Sundhage

No.	Pos.	Player	Date of birth (age)	Caps	Goals	Club
1	GK	Bárbara	4 July 1988 (aged 33)	93	0	(Brazilian Football Confederation) Kindermann
2	DF	Poliana	6 February 1991 (aged 30)	63	5	(Brazilian Football Confederation) Corinthians
3	DF	Érika	4 February 1988 (aged 33)	99	8	(Brazilian Football Confederation) Corinthians
4	DF	Rafaelle	18 June 1991 (aged 30)	58	8	(Brazilian Football Confederation) Palmeiras
5	MF	Julia	7 October 1997 (aged 23)	5	2	(Brazilian Football Confederation) Palmeiras
6	DF	Tamires	10 October 1987 (age 39)	91	5	(Brazilian Football Confederation) Corinthians
7	FW	Duda	18 July 1995 (aged 26)	3	1	(Brazilian Football Confederation) São Paulo
8	MF	Formiga	3 March 1978 (aged 43)	196	67	(Brazilian Football Confederation) São Paulo
9	FW	Debinha	20 October 1991 (aged 29)	87	33	(United States Soccer Federation) North Carolina Courage
10	FW	Marta (captain)	19 February 1986 (aged 35)	151	107	(United States Soccer Federation) Orlando Pride
11	MF	Angelina	26 January 2000 (age 26)	0	0	(United States Soccer Federation) OL Reign
12	FW	Ludmila	1 December 1994 (aged 26)	28	3	(Royal Spanish Football Federation) Atlético Madrid
13	DF	Bruna	16 October 1985 (aged 35)	62	9	(Brazilian Football Confederation) Internacional
14	DF	Jucinara	3 August 1993 (aged 27)	16	0	(Royal Spanish Football Federation) Levante
15	FW	Geyse	27 March 1998 (aged 23)	33	16	(Royal Spanish Football Federation) Madrid CFF
16	FW	Beatriz	17 December 1993 (aged 27)	78	31	(Brazilian Football Confederation) Palmeiras
17	MF	Andressinha	1 May 1995 (aged 26)	76	10	(Brazilian Football Confederation) Corinthians
18	GK	Letícia Izidoro	13 August 1994 (aged 26)	66	0	(Portuguese Football Federation) Benfica
19	DF	Letícia Santos	2 December 1994 (aged 26)	41	0	(German Football Association) Eintracht Frankfurt
20	FW	Gio	21 June 2003 (aged 18)	2	0	(Royal Spanish Football Federation) Barcelona
21	FW	Andressa	10 November 1992 (aged 28)	89	20	(Italian Football Federation) Roma
22	GK	Aline	15 April 1989 (aged 32)	13	0	(Royal Spanish Football Federation) Granadilla

=== China PR ===
A provisional squad of 26 athletes was named on 8 June 2021. The final squad of 22 athletes was announced on 7 July 2021. On 9 July 2021, Chen Qiaozhu replaced Jin Kun.

Head coach: Jia Xiuquan

No.	Pos.	Player	Date of birth (age)	Caps	Goals	Club
1	GK	Zhu Yu	23 July 1997 (aged 23)	1	0	(Chinese Football Association) Wuhan Jianghan University
2	DF	Li Mengwen	28 March 1995 (aged 26)	7	0	(Chinese Football Association) Jiangsu
3	DF	Lin Yuping	28 February 1992 (aged 29)	17	0	(Chinese Football Association) Meizhou Hakka
4	MF	Li Qingtong	14 April 1999 (aged 22)	1	0	(Chinese Football Association) Meizhou Hakka
5	DF	Wu Haiyan	26 February 1993 (aged 28)	120	2	(Chinese Football Association) Wuhan Jianghan University
6	MF	Zhang Xin	23 May 1992 (aged 29)	9	2	(Chinese Football Association) Shanghai Shengli
7	MF	Wang Shuang	23 January 1995 (aged 26)	106	29	(Chinese Football Association) Wuhan Jianghan University
8	MF	Wang Yan	22 August 1991 (aged 29)	30	0	(Chinese Football Association) Beijing BG Phoenix
9	MF	Miao Siwen	24 January 1995 (aged 26)	1	0	(Chinese Football Association) Shanghai Shengli
10	MF	Wang Yanwen	27 March 1999 (aged 22)	0	0	(Chinese Football Association) Beijing BG Phoenix
11	FW	Wang Shanshan (captain)	27 January 1990 (aged 31)	136	52	(Chinese Football Association) Tianjin Shengde
12	GK	Peng Shimeng	12 May 1998 (aged 23)	30	0	(Chinese Football Association) Jiangsu
13	MF	Yang Lina	13 April 1994 (aged 27)	19	2	(Chinese Football Association) Shanghai Shengli
14	MF	Liu Jing	28 April 1998 (aged 23)	0	0	(Chinese Football Association) Changchun Dazhong Zhuoyue
15	FW	Yang Man	2 November 1995 (aged 25)	16	3	(Chinese Football Association) Shandong Sports Lottery
16	DF	Wang Xiaoxue	20 October 1994 (aged 26)	2	0	(Chinese Football Association) Jiangsu
17	DF	Luo Guiping	20 April 1993 (aged 28)	8	0	(Chinese Football Association) Meizhou Hakka
18	FW	Wurigumula	26 August 1996 (aged 24)	0	0	(Chinese Football Association) Changchun Dazhong Zhuoyue
19	MF	Wang Ying	18 November 1997 (aged 23)	3	0	(Chinese Football Association) Wuhan Jianghan University
20	FW	Xiao Yuyi	10 January 1996 (aged 25)	30	4	(Chinese Football Association) Shanghai Shengli
21	MF	Chen Qiaozhu	8 September 1999 (aged 21)	0	0	(Chinese Football Association) Meizhou Hakka
22	GK	Ding Xuan	11 February 1989 (aged 32)	0	0	(Chinese Football Association) Shanghai Shengli

=== Netherlands ===
The final squad of 22 athletes was announced on 16 June 2021. On 20 July 2021, Joëlle Smits replaced Sherida Spitse due to injury.

Head coach: Sarina Wiegman

No.	Pos.	Player	Date of birth (age)	Caps	Goals	Club
1	GK	Sari van Veenendaal (captain)	3 April 1990 (aged 31)	74	0	(Royal Dutch Football Association) PSV
2	DF	Lynn Wilms	3 October 2000 (aged 20)	12	1	(Royal Dutch Football Association) FC Twente
3	DF	Stefanie van der Gragt	16 August 1992 (aged 28)	75	10	(Royal Dutch Football Association) Ajax
4	DF	Aniek Nouwen	9 March 1999 (aged 22)	16	1	(Royal Dutch Football Association) PSV
5	DF	Merel van Dongen	11 February 1993 (aged 28)	51	1	(Royal Spanish Football Federation) Atlético Madrid
6	MF	Jill Roord	22 April 1997 (aged 24)	64	11	(The Football Association) Arsenal
7	FW	Shanice van de Sanden	2 October 1992 (aged 28)	85	19	(German Football Association) VfL Wolfsburg
8	FW	Joëlle Smits	7 February 2000 (aged 21)	4	0	(Royal Dutch Football Association) PSV
9	FW	Vivianne Miedema	15 July 1996 (aged 25)	96	73	(The Football Association) Arsenal
10	MF	Daniëlle van de Donk	5 August 1991 (aged 29)	114	28	(The Football Association) Arsenal
11	FW	Lieke Martens	16 December 1992 (aged 28)	123	49	(Royal Spanish Football Federation) Barcelona
12	FW	Sisca Folkertsma	21 May 1997 (aged 24)	12	0	(Royal Dutch Football Association) FC Twente
13	MF	Victoria Pelova	3 June 1999 (aged 22)	11	0	(Royal Dutch Football Association) Ajax
14	MF	Jackie Groenen	17 December 1994 (aged 26)	71	7	(The Football Association) Manchester United
15	DF	Kika van Es	11 October 1991 (aged 29)	70	0	(Royal Dutch Football Association) FC Twente
16	GK	Lize Kop	17 March 1998 (aged 23)	6	0	(Royal Dutch Football Association) Ajax
17	DF	Dominique Janssen	17 January 1995 (aged 26)	71	2	(German Football Association) VfL Wolfsburg
18	FW	Lineth Beerensteyn	11 October 1996 (aged 24)	66	12	(German Football Association) Bayern Munich
19	FW	Renate Jansen	7 December 1990 (aged 30)	48	4	(Royal Dutch Football Association) FC Twente
20	MF	Inessa Kaagman	17 April 1996 (aged 25)	11	0	(The Football Association) Brighton & Hove Albion
21	DF	Anouk Dekker	15 November 1986 (aged 34)	86	7	(French Football Federation) Montpellier
22	GK	Loes Geurts	12 January 1986 (aged 35)	125	0	(Swedish Football Association) BK Häcken

=== Zambia ===
The following 22 athletes were named on 2 July 2021.

Head coach: Bruce Mwape

No.	Pos.	Player	Date of birth (age)	Caps	Goals	Club
1	GK	Catherine Musonda	20 February 1998 (aged 23)			(Football Association of Zambia) Indeni Roses
2	DF	Fikile Khosa	24 July 1996 (aged 24)			(Football Association of Zambia) Red Arrows
3	DF	Lushomo Mweemba	10 April 2001 (aged 20)			(Football Association of Zambia) Green Buffaloes
4	DF	Esther Siamfuko	8 August 2004 (aged 16)			(Football Association of Zambia) Queens Academy
5	DF	Anita Mulenga	3 May 1995 (aged 26)			(Football Association of Zambia) Green Buffaloes
6	MF	Mary Wilombe	22 September 1997 (aged 23)			(Football Association of Zambia) Red Arrows
7	FW	Lubandji Ochumba	1 July 2001 (aged 20)			(Football Association of Zambia) Red Arrows
8	DF	Margaret Belemu	24 February 1997 (aged 24)			(Football Association of Zambia) Red Arrows
9	FW	Hellen Mubanga	23 May 1995 (aged 26)			(Royal Spanish Football Federation) Zaragoza CFF
10	MF	Grace Chanda	11 June 1997 (aged 24)			(Football Association of Zambia) Red Arrows
11	FW	Barbra Banda (captain)	20 March 2000 (aged 21)	5	9	(Chinese Football Association) Shanghai Shengli
12	FW	Avell Chitundu	30 July 1997 (aged 23)			(Football Association of Zambia) ZESCO United
13	DF	Martha Tembo	8 March 1998 (aged 23)			(Football Association of Zambia) Green Buffaloes
14	MF	Ireen Lungu	6 October 1997 (aged 23)			(Football Association of Zambia) Green Buffaloes
15	DF	Agness Musase	11 July 1997 (aged 24)			(Football Association of Zambia) Green Buffaloes
16	GK	Hazel Nali	4 April 1998 (aged 23)			(Israel Football Association) Hapoel Be'er Sheva
17	MF	Racheal Kundananji	3 June 2000 (aged 21)			(Kazakhstan Football Federation) BIIK Kazygurt
18	DF	Vast Phiri	3 February 1996 (aged 25)			(Football Association of Zambia) ZESCO United
19	MF	Evarine Katongo	29 December 2002 (aged 18)			(Football Association of Zambia) ZISD Queens
20	DF	Esther Mukwasa	24 October 1996 (aged 24)			(Football Association of Zambia) Indeni Roses
21	MF	Hellen Chanda	19 June 1998 (aged 23)			(Football Association of Zambia) Red Arrows
22	GK	Ngambo Musole	26 June 1998 (aged 23)			(Football Association of Zambia) ZESCO United

== Group G ==
=== Australia ===
The following 22 athletes were named on 30 June 2021.

Head coach: (Sweden) Tony Gustavsson

No.	Pos.	Player	Date of birth (age)	Caps	Goals	Club
1	GK	Lydia Williams	13 May 1988 (aged 33)	89	0	(The Football Association) Arsenal
2	FW	Sam Kerr (captain)	10 September 1993 (aged 27)	92	42	(The Football Association) Chelsea
3	MF	Kyra Cooney-Cross	15 February 2002 (aged 19)	2	0	(Football Australia) Melbourne Victory
4	DF	Clare Polkinghorne	1 February 1989 (aged 32)	128	11	(Swedish Football Association) Vittsjö GIK
5	MF	Aivi Luik	18 March 1985 (aged 36)	29	0	(Royal Spanish Football Federation) Sevilla
6	MF	Chloe Logarzo	22 December 1994 (aged 26)	48	8	(United States Soccer Federation) Kansas City
7	DF	Steph Catley	26 January 1994 (aged 27)	84	3	(The Football Association) Arsenal
8	MF	Elise Kellond-Knight	10 August 1990 (aged 30)	113	2	(Swedish Football Association) Hammarby IF
9	FW	Caitlin Foord	11 November 1994 (aged 26)	86	20	(The Football Association) Arsenal
10	MF	Emily van Egmond	12 July 1993 (aged 28)	101	23	(The Football Association) West Ham United
11	MF	Mary Fowler	14 February 2003 (aged 18)	8	1	(French Football Federation) Montpellier
12	DF	Ellie Carpenter	28 April 2000 (aged 21)	44	1	(French Football Federation) Lyon
13	MF	Tameka Yallop	16 June 1991 (aged 30)	89	10	(Football Australia) Brisbane Roar
14	DF	Alanna Kennedy	21 January 1995 (aged 26)	91	7	(The Football Association) Tottenham Hotspur
15	FW	Emily Gielnik	13 May 1992 (aged 29)	41	10	(Swedish Football Association) Vittsjö GIK
16	FW	Hayley Raso	5 September 1994 (aged 26)	50	6	(The Football Association) Everton
17	FW	Kyah Simon	25 June 1991 (aged 30)	94	26	(Royal Dutch Football Association) PSV
18	GK	Teagan Micah	20 October 1997 (aged 23)	1	0	(Norwegian Football Federation) Sandviken
19	DF	Courtney Nevin	12 February 2002 (aged 19)	2	0	(Football Australia) Western Sydney Wanderers
20	DF	Charlotte Grant	20 September 2001 (aged 19)	0	0	(Swedish Football Association) FC Rosengård
21	DF	Laura Brock	28 November 1989 (aged 31)	63	2	(French Football Federation) EA de Guingamp
22	GK	Mackenzie Arnold	25 February 1994 (aged 27)	26	0	(The Football Association) West Ham United

=== New Zealand ===
The final squad of 22 athletes was announced on 25 June 2021.

Head coach: (Scotland) Tom Sermanni

No.	Pos.	Player	Date of birth (age)	Caps	Goals	Club
1	GK	Erin Nayler	17 April 1992 (aged 29)	71	0	(The Football Association) Reading
2	MF	Ria Percival	7 December 1989 (aged 31)	150	14	(The Football Association) Tottenham Hotspur
3	DF	Anna Green	20 August 1990 (aged 30)	77	7	(New Zealand Football) Lower Hutt City
4	DF	C. J. Bott	22 April 1995 (aged 26)	24	1	(Norwegian Football Federation) Vålerenga Fotball Damer
5	DF	Meikayla Moore	4 June 1996 (aged 25)	41	3	(The Football Association) Liverpool
6	DF	Claudia Bunge	21 September 1999 (aged 21)	4	0	(Football Australia) Melbourne Victory
7	DF	Ali Riley (captain)	30 October 1987 (aged 33)	134	1	(United States Soccer Federation) Orlando Pride
8	DF	Abby Erceg	20 November 1989 (aged 31)	141	6	(United States Soccer Federation) North Carolina Courage
9	FW	Gabi Rennie	7 July 2001 (aged 20)	0	0	(United States Soccer Federation) Indiana Hoosiers
10	MF	Annalie Longo	1 July 1991 (aged 30)	123	15	(Football Australia) Melbourne Victory
11	MF	Olivia Chance	5 October 1993 (aged 27)	20	1	(Football Australia) Brisbane Roar
12	MF	Betsy Hassett	4 August 1990 (aged 30)	119	13	(Football Association of Iceland) Stjarnan
13	FW	Paige Satchell	13 April 1998 (aged 23)	18	1	(Football Australia) Canberra United
14	MF	Katie Bowen	15 April 1994 (aged 27)	70	3	(United States Soccer Federation) Kansas City NWSL
15	MF	Daisy Cleverley	30 April 1997 (aged 24)	9	2	(United States Soccer Federation) Georgetown Hoyas
16	MF	Emma Rolston	10 November 1996 (aged 24)	5	6	(New Zealand Football) Northern Lights
17	FW	Hannah Wilkinson	28 May 1992 (aged 29)	97	26	(German Football Association) MSV Duisburg
18	GK	Anna Leat	26 June 2001 (aged 20)	4	0	(New Zealand Football) FFDP
19	DF	Elizabeth Anton	12 December 1998 (aged 22)	5	0	(New Zealand Football) FFDP
20	DF	Marisa van der Meer	27 March 2002 (aged 19)	0	0	(New Zealand Football) FFDP
21	FW	Michaela Robertson	28 August 1996 (aged 24)	0	0	(New Zealand Football) Lower Hutt City
22	GK	Victoria Esson	6 March 1991 (aged 30)	3	0	(Norwegian Football Federation) Avaldsnes

=== Sweden ===
The final squad of 22 athletes was announced on 29 June 2021.

Head coach: Peter Gerhardsson

No.	Pos.	Player	Date of birth (age)	Caps	Goals	Club
1	GK	Hedvig Lindahl	29 April 1983 (aged 38)	172	0	(Royal Spanish Football Federation) Atlético Madrid
2	DF	Jonna Andersson	2 January 1993 (aged 28)	56	1	(The Football Association) Chelsea
3	DF	Emma Kullberg	25 September 1991 (aged 29)	6	0	(Swedish Football Association) Häcken
4	DF	Hanna Glas	16 April 1993 (aged 28)	42	0	(German Football Association) Bayern Munich
5	MF	Hanna Bennison	16 October 2002 (aged 18)	8	0	(Swedish Football Association) Rosengård
6	DF	Magdalena Eriksson	8 September 1993 (aged 27)	70	8	(The Football Association) Chelsea
7	FW	Madelen Janogy	12 November 1995 (aged 25)	17	4	(Swedish Football Association) Hammarby
8	FW	Lina Hurtig	5 September 1995 (aged 25)	38	12	(Italian Football Federation) Juventus
9	FW	Kosovare Asllani	29 July 1989 (aged 31)	148	38	(Royal Spanish Football Federation) Real Madrid
10	FW	Sofia Jakobsson	23 April 1990 (aged 31)	123	23	(Royal Spanish Football Federation) Real Madrid
11	FW	Stina Blackstenius	5 February 1996 (aged 25)	64	17	(Swedish Football Association) Häcken
12	GK	Jennifer Falk	26 April 1993 (aged 28)	8	0	(Swedish Football Association) Häcken
13	DF	Amanda Ilestedt	17 January 1993 (aged 28)	41	4	(German Football Association) Bayern Munich
14	DF	Nathalie Björn	4 May 1997 (aged 24)	26	4	(Swedish Football Association) Rosengård
15	MF	Olivia Schough	11 March 1991 (aged 30)	83	11	(Swedish Football Association) Rosengård
16	MF	Filippa Angeldal	14 July 1997 (aged 24)	11	4	(Swedish Football Association) Häcken
17	MF	Caroline Seger (captain)	19 March 1985 (aged 36)	215	29	(Swedish Football Association) Rosengård
18	FW	Fridolina Rolfö	24 November 1993 (aged 27)	50	14	(German Football Association) VfL Wolfsburg
19	FW	Anna Anvegård	10 May 1997 (aged 24)	19	8	(Swedish Football Association) Rosengård
20	MF	Julia Roddar	16 February 1992 (aged 29)	9	0	(United States Soccer Federation) Washington Spirit
21	FW	Rebecka Blomqvist	24 July 1997 (aged 23)	8	1	(German Football Association) VfL Wolfsburg
22	GK	Zećira Mušović	26 May 1996 (aged 25)	5	0	(The Football Association) Chelsea

=== United States ===
The final squad of 22 was announced on 23 June 2021.

Head coach: (North Macedonia) Vlatko Andonovski

No.	Pos.	Player	Date of birth (age)	Caps	Goals	Club
1	GK	Alyssa Naeher	20 April 1988 (aged 33)	73	0	(United States Soccer Federation) Chicago Red Stars
2	DF	Crystal Dunn	3 July 1992 (aged 29)	116	24	(United States Soccer Federation) Portland Thorns
3	MF	Sam Mewis	9 October 1992 (aged 28)	77	23	(United States Soccer Federation) North Carolina Courage
4	DF	Becky Sauerbrunn (captain)	6 June 1985 (aged 36)	188	0	(United States Soccer Federation) Portland Thorns
5	DF	Kelley O'Hara	4 August 1988 (aged 32)	140	2	(United States Soccer Federation) Washington Spirit
6	MF	Kristie Mewis	25 February 1991 (aged 30)	26	4	(United States Soccer Federation) Houston Dash
7	FW	Tobin Heath	29 May 1988 (aged 33)	171	35	Unattached
8	MF	Julie Ertz	6 April 1992 (aged 29)	110	20	(United States Soccer Federation) Chicago Red Stars
9	MF	Lindsey Horan	26 May 1994 (aged 27)	98	22	(United States Soccer Federation) Portland Thorns
10	FW	Carli Lloyd	16 July 1982 (aged 39)	306	126	(United States Soccer Federation) Gotham FC
11	FW	Christen Press	29 December 1988 (aged 32)	149	63	Unattached
12	DF	Tierna Davidson	19 September 1998 (aged 22)	34	1	(United States Soccer Federation) Chicago Red Stars
13	FW	Alex Morgan	2 July 1989 (aged 32)	180	110	(United States Soccer Federation) Orlando Pride
14	DF	Emily Sonnett	25 November 1993 (aged 27)	56	0	(United States Soccer Federation) Washington Spirit
15	FW	Megan Rapinoe	5 July 1985 (aged 36)	179	59	(United States Soccer Federation) OL Reign
16	MF	Rose Lavelle	14 May 1995 (aged 26)	56	14	(United States Soccer Federation) OL Reign
17	DF	Abby Dahlkemper	13 May 1993 (aged 28)	71	0	(The Football Association) Manchester City
18	GK	Adrianna Franch	12 November 1990 (aged 30)	6	0	(United States Soccer Federation) Portland Thorns
19	MF	Catarina Macario	4 October 1999 (aged 21)	7	1	(French Football Federation) Lyon
20	DF	Casey Krueger	23 August 1990 (aged 30)	34	0	(United States Soccer Federation) Chicago Red Stars
21	FW	Lynn Williams	21 May 1993 (aged 28)	37	11	(United States Soccer Federation) North Carolina Courage
22	GK	Jane Campbell	17 February 1995 (aged 26)	5	0	(United States Soccer Federation) Houston Dash
