= List of Zambia women's international footballers =

This is a list of Zambia women's international soccer players who have played for the Zambia women's national football team.

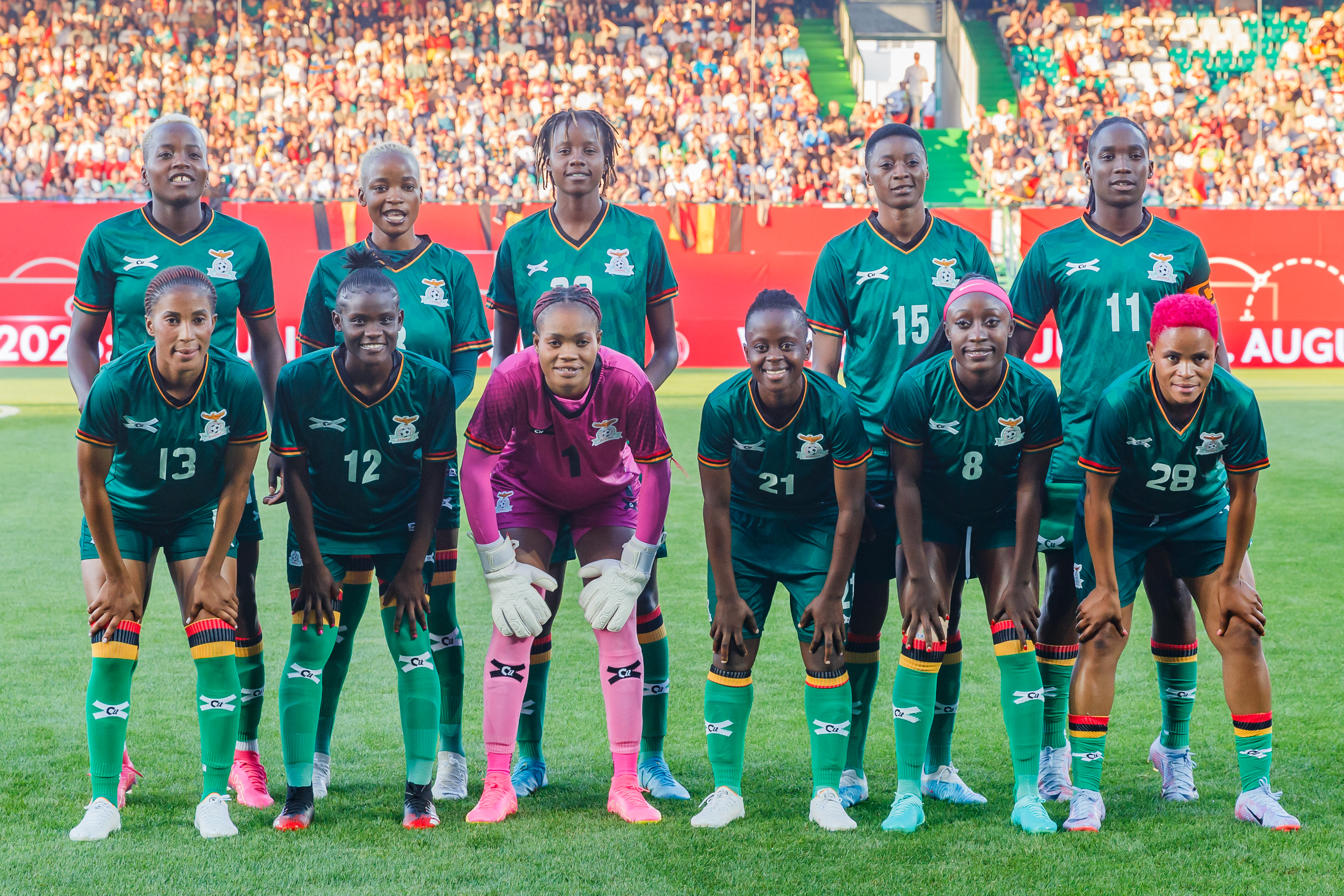
The Copper Queens starting XI in a friendly match against Germany in 2023.

== List of players ==
Positions key
GK	Goalkeeper
DF	Defender
MF	Midfielder
FW	Forward

Player	Position	Years active	Goals
Barbra Banda	FW	2016–	57
Susan Banda	MF		
Margaret Belemu	DF		
Ngosa Chabwe	FW		
Grace Chanda	MK	2018–	19
Regina Chanda	FW		
Maweta Chilenga	FW		
Grace Chilenga	MF		
Rhoda Chileshe	MF		
Prisca Chilufya	FW		
Mercy Chipasula	FW		
Avell Chitundu	MF		
Jackline Chomba	DF		
Magaret Gondwe	DF		
Inonge Kaloustian	FW		
Evarine Katongo	MF		
Racheal Kundananji	FW		
Ireen Lungu	MF		
Blessing Maluba	DF		
Mapalo Maluba	MF		
Xiomara Mapepa	DF		
Chishala Mfunte	GK		
Fridah Mukoma	FW		
Matildah Mukunda	DF		
Penelope Mulubwa	FW		
Abigail Munkombwe	MF		
Kabange Mupopo	FW		
Ngambo Musole	GK		
Catherine Musonda	GK		
Lushomo Mweemba	DF		
Rachael Nachula	DF		
Hazel Nali	GK		
Annie Namonje	GK		
Natasha Nanyangwe	MF		
Memory Nthala	DF		
Lubandji Ochumba	MF		
Eneless Phiri	MF		
Eunice Sakala	GK		
Esther Siamfuko	DF		
Judith Soko	DF		
Martha Tembo	DF		
Mary Wilombe	MF		
Pauline Zulu	DF		

== See also ==
- Zambia women's national football team
