= Fikile =

Fikile is a given name. Notable people with the name include:

- Fikile Khosa, Zambian footballer
- Fikile Magadlela (1952–2003), South African painter
- Fikile Mbalula (born 1971), South African politician
- Fikile Mthwalo (born 1989), Lesotho-born South African actress and script writer
- Fikile Ntshangase, South African environmental activist
