= Inonge Kaloustian =

Zambian footballer (born 1999)

Inonge Kaloustian is a footballer who plays as a midfielder or striker for the Zambia national team. She was born in the United States.

== Early life ==
Kaloustian played basketball. She attended Eleanor Roosevelt High School in the Greenbelt, Maryland, where she was regarded as one of the team's most important players.

== Club career ==
Kaloustian has been described as having "a significant role in promoting football at an educational level in Zambia. Her participation helps foster a strong sports culture among students". She signed for Zambian side ZISD. She made ten appearances and scored one goal for the club as they finished 14th in the league with 35 points.

== International career ==
In 2023, Kaloustian was called up to the Zambia women's national football team for two matches against South Korea. However, her call-up was regarded as controversial by supporters.

== Style of play ==
Kaloustian mainly operates as a midfielder or striker and is known for her "tactical awareness, technical finesse, and leadership qualities".

== Personal life ==
Kaloustian is a native of Prince George's County, United States. She is the daughter of Dr. Monde Muyanga, the USAID Assistant Administrator Bureau for Africa Office.
