= Fikile Khosa =

Zambian footballer (born 1996)

Personal information
- Date of birth: 24 July 1996 (age 30)
- Place of birth: Zambia
- Position: Defender

Team information
- Current team: Red Arrows

Senior career*
Years	Team	Apps	(Gls)
- Red Arrows
- * Club domestic league appearances and goals

Fikile Khosa is a professional Zambian footballer plays as a defender for Red Arrows. She is part of the Zambian Football team in the football competition at the 2020 Summer Olympics.
