= Bibiane Schulze =

German footballer

Personal information
- Full name: Bibiane Gabrielle Schulze Solano
- Date of birth: 12 November 1998 (age 27)
- Place of birth: Bad Soden, Germany
- Height: 1.74 m (5 ft 9 in)
- Position: Centre back

Team information
- Current team: Athletic Club
- Number: 21

Youth career
- 2005–2010: FV 08 Neuenhain
- 2010–2016: 1.FFC Frankfurt

Senior career*
Years	Team	Apps	(Gls)
2016–2019	1.FFC Frankfurt II	36	(3)
2017–2019	1.FFC Frankfurt	7	(0)
2019–2021	Athletic Club B	32	(2)
2019–	Athletic Club	37	(0)

International career^{‡}
2024–	Germany	7	(0)
Medal record
Olympic Games
Bronze medal – third place	2024 Paris	Team
- * Club domestic league appearances and goals as of 25 July 2025 ‡ National team caps and goals as of 18:57, 7 August 2024 (UTC)

Bibiane Gabrielle "Bibi" Schulze Solano (born 12 November 1998) is a German professional footballer who plays as a centre back for Spanish Liga F club Athletic Bilbao (women) and the Germany national team. Born and raised in Germany, she is of Basque heritage on her mother's side and was called up for the Spain national squad in 2023.

== Club career ==
Schulze joined the youth system of 1.FFC Frankfurt from FV 08 Neuenhain and progressed through the ranks to play seven times in the Frauen-Bundesliga for the club. She departed for Athletic Bilbao in July 2019. The move proved controversial, as some Athletic supporters questioned whether Schulze was sufficiently connected to the Basque Country to conform to the club's signing policy. Club president Aitor Elizegi rejected the complaints, attesting to Schulze's "clear Basque origin" (in addition to the family typically spending summer holidays in the region, her great-grandfather Francisco Belauste played for the club in its early years).

In her first two seasons in Spanish football Schulze was predominantly restricted to appearances for the Athletic B team, although she made one Primera División appearance as a substitute against Sevilla in October 2020. In July 2021, Schulze signed a season-long loan deal with Athletic's Primera División rivals Valencia CF. With regular central defenders Garazi Murua and Naroa Uriarte absent through injury, Schulze became an important member of the Athletic side in the first half of the 2022–23 season.

After starting the first two fixtures of the 2024–25 season, Schulze suffered a rupture to the anterior cruciate ligament in her knee; she did not feature again in the campaign.

== International career ==
Overlooked for the Germany selection at the 2015 UEFA Women's Under-17 Championship in Iceland, Schulze made a late, unsuccessful approach through her Frankfurt team-mate Verónica Boquete to represent Spain at the event. Due to her form for Athletic, she was called up for the Spanish squad in February 2023 – but had to withdraw a day later due to injury.

In April 2024, Schulze made her debut for the German national team. Three months later, she was called up to the Germany squad for the 2024 Summer Olympics.

== Career statistics ==
=== International ===
As of 6 August 2024

Appearances and goals by national team and year
National team	Year	Apps	Goals
Germany	2024	7	0
Total		7	0

== Honours ==
Germany

- Summer Olympics bronze medal: 2024

Individual

- Silbernes Lorbeerblatt: 2024
