= Eunice Sakala =

Zambian footballer (born 2002)

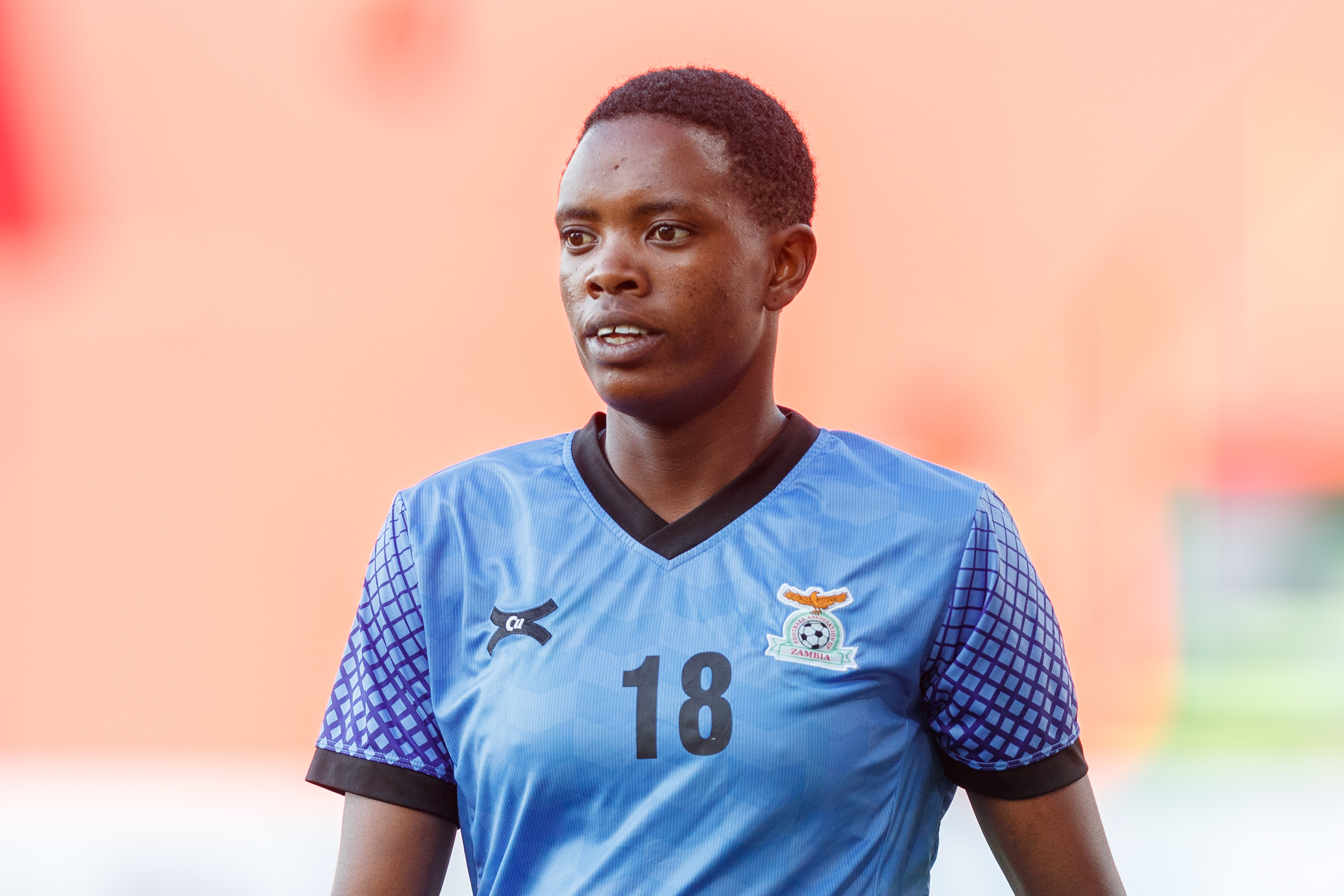
- Sakala with Zambia in 2023

Personal information
- Date of birth: 23 May 2002 (age 24)
- Position: Goalkeeper

Team information
- Current team: Nkwazi Queens

Senior career*
Years	Team	Apps	(Gls)
- Nkwazi Queens

International career
- Zambia
- * Club domestic league appearances and goals

Eunice Sakala (born 23 May 2002) is a Zambian footballer who plays as a goalkeeper for Nkwazi Queens and the Zambia women's national team.

== International career ==
Sakala was part of the Zambia squad for the 2023 FIFA Women's World Cup.

On 3 July 2024, Sakala was called up to the Zambia squad for the 2024 Summer Olympics.

== Honours ==
Zambia

- COSAFA Women's Championship: 2022
