= Hellen Chanda =

Zambian footballer (born 1998)

Personal information
- Full name: Hellen Ng'andwe Chanda
- Date of birth: 19 June 1998 (age 28)
- Place of birth: Lusaka, Zambia
- Height: 1.63 m (5 ft 4 in)
- Position: Forward

Team information
- Current team: Eastern Flames
- Number: 6

Senior career*
Years	Team	Apps	(Gls)
- Red Arrows F.C.
2022–2023	Green Buffaloes		
2023	BIIK Shymkent		
2023–2024	Hakkarigücü Spor		
2025–	Eastern Flames		

International career^{‡}
2018–	Zambia	7	(0)
- * Club domestic league appearances and goals ‡ National team caps and goals as of 20 July 2023

Hellen Ng'andwe Chanda (born 19 June 1998) is a Zambian footballer who plays as a forward for Saudi Women's Premier League club Eastern Flames and the Zambia women's national team.

== International career ==
Chanda was called up to the Zambia squad for the 2018 Women's Africa Cup of Nations. She competed at the 2018 Africa Women Cup of Nations, playing in one match.

On 2 July 2021, Chanda was called up to the 23-player Zambia squad for the delayed 2020 Summer Olympics.

Chanda was named to the Zambia squad for the 2023 FIFA Women's World Cup.

On 3 July 2024, Chanda was called up to the Zambia squad for the 2024 Summer Olympics.
