= Rhoda Chileshe =

Zambian footballer (born 1998)

Personal information
- Date of birth: 8 May 1998 (age 28)
- Position: Defender

Team information
- Current team: Indeni Roses

Youth career
- Bauleni United Sports Academy

Senior career*
Years	Team	Apps	(Gls)
- Zesco Ndola Girls
- Indeni Roses

International career
2016–	Zambia	4+	(0+)
- * Club domestic league appearances and goals

Rhoda Chileshe (born 8 May 1998) is a Zambian footballer who plays as a defender for Indeni Roses and the Zambia women's national team.

== International career ==
Chileshe made her international debut in 2016.

On 3 July 2024, Chileshe was called up to the Zambia squad for the 2024 Summer Olympics.

== International goals ==
No.	Date	Venue	Opponent	Score	Result	Competition
1.	13 July 2024	Stade Louis Darragon, Vichy, France	New Zealand	1–0	1–1	Friendly
