= Bruce Mwape =

Zambian football coach (1959–2026)

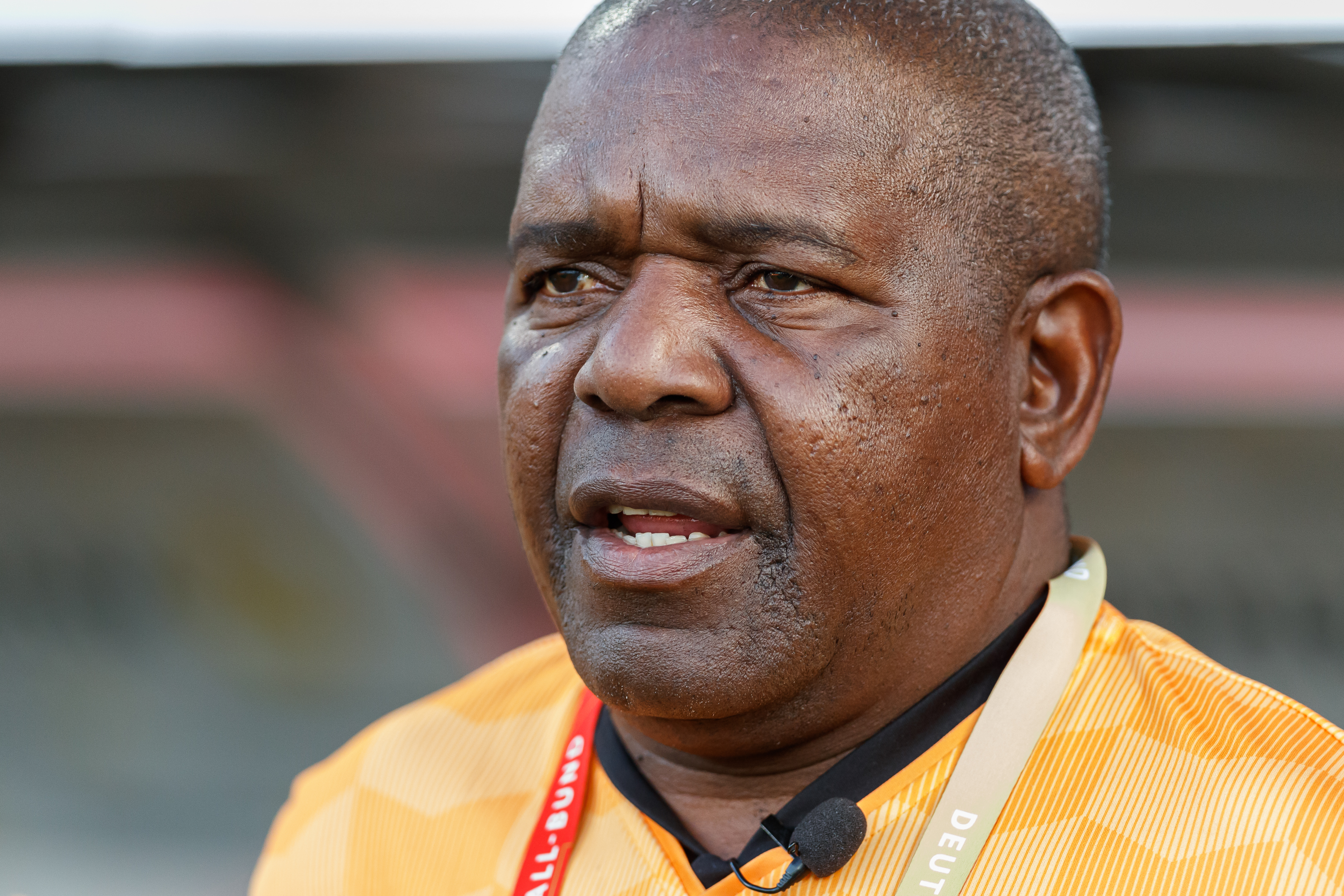
- Mwape in 2023

Personal information
- Date of birth: 26 October 1959
- Date of death: 9 July 2026 (aged 66)
- Place of death: Chingola, Zambia

Managerial career
- Years: Team
- 2018–2025: Zambia women's

Bruce Mwape (26 October 1959 – 9 July 2026) was a Zambian football coach.

== Career ==
Mwape was born on 26 October 1959. He was appointed head coach of the Zambia women's national team in May 2018 succeeding Albert Kachinga who returned to club football. He would lead the team in the 2018 Women's Africa Cup of Nations. The Copper Queens were not able to advance from the group stage. Zambia would qualify for the women's football tournament of the 2020 Summer Olympics in Tokyo which was later postponed to 2021 due to the COVID-19 pandemic. They did not manage to progress to the quarterfinals after losing two and drawing one of its matches in the group stage. Mwape coached the team again in the 2022 Women's Africa Cup of Nations. This time the Zambians finished third, their best ever finish in the continental tournament. They also secured a berth in the 2023 FIFA Women's World Cup after they progressed to the semifinals – their first ever qualification.

== Controversies ==
In July 2023, allegations of sexual misconduct against Mwape surfaced. Mwape denied the accusations. The allegations, reported by The Guardian, accuse the coach of inappropriate behavior towards one of the players before Zambia's Women's World Cup match against Costa Rica. Football Association of Zambia stated that they had not received any complaint from players or officials. In May 2024, Mwape was again accused of sexual assault, this time on a FIFA employee during the World Cup. In July 2024, he was banned from private contact with his players at the 2024 Summer Olympic Games.

== Death ==
Mwape died after a short illness in Chingola, on 9 July 2026, at the age of 66.

== Honours ==
Zambia

- COSAFA Women's Championship: 2022
