= Mary Wilombe =

Zambian footballer (born 1997)

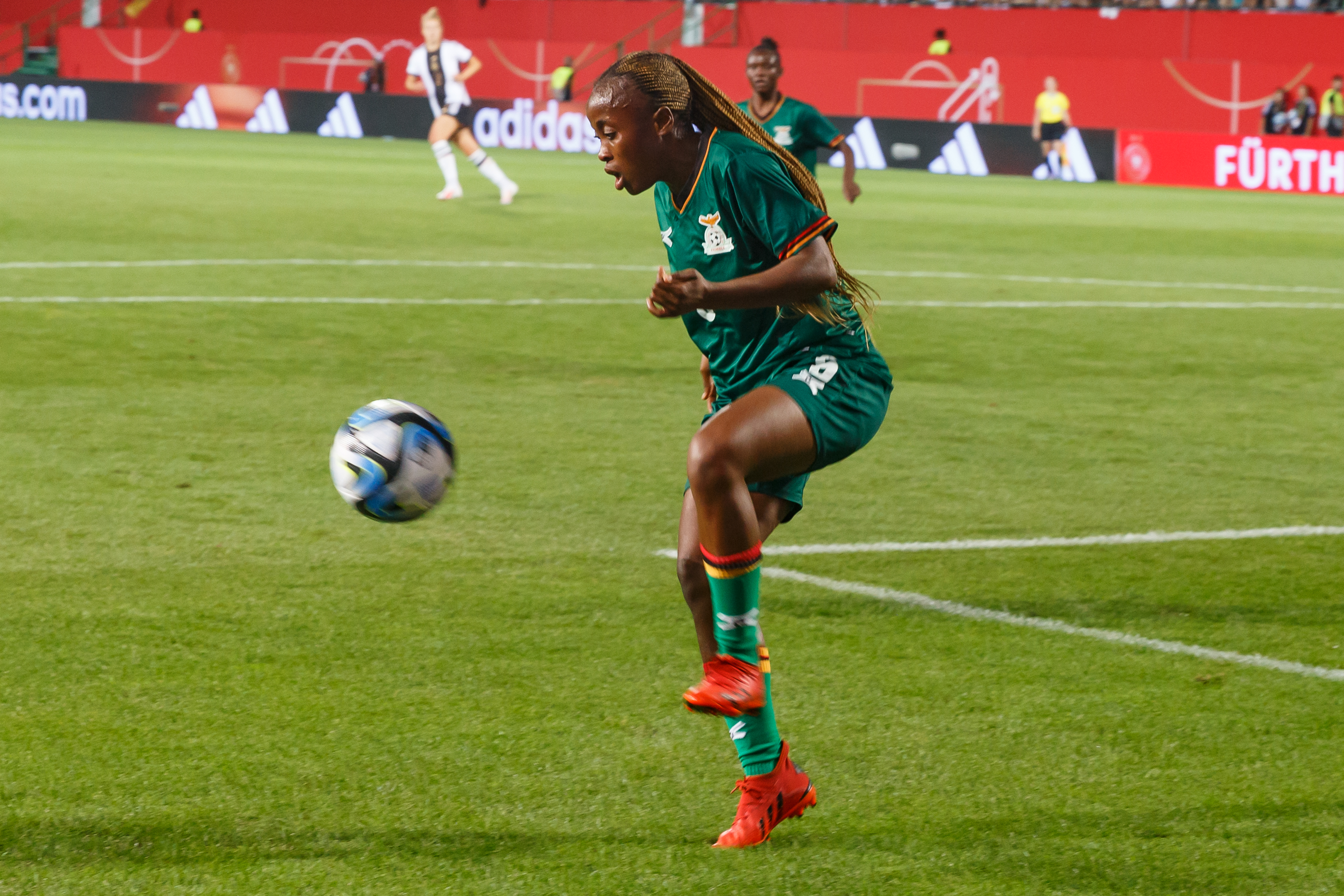

Personal information
- Date of birth: 22 September 1997 (age 29)
- Height: 1.55 m (5 ft 1 in)
- Positions: Midfielder; defender

Team information
- Current team: Red Arrows

Youth career
- 2014: Lusaka Foundation

Senior career*
Years	Team	Apps	(Gls)
- Red Arrows

International career^{‡}
2014	Zambia U17	3	(0)
2015	Zambia U20		
2020–	Zambia	1	(0)
Medal record
Representing Zambia
Women's Africa Cup of Nations
Third place	2022 Morocco
- * Club domestic league appearances and goals ‡ National team caps and goals as of 28 November 2020

Mary Wilombe (born 22 September 1997) is a Zambian footballer who plays as a midfielder for Red Arrows F.C. and the Zambia women's national team.

== International career ==
Wilombe represented Zambia at the 2014 FIFA U-17 Women's World Cup.

On 2 July 2021, Wilombe was called up to the 23-player Zambia squad for the delayed 2020 Summer Olympics.

Wilombe was called up to the Zambia squad for the 2022 Women's Africa Cup of Nations, where they finished in third place.

She was named to the Zambia squad for the 2023 FIFA Women's World Cup.

On 3 July 2024, Wilombe was called up to the Zambia squad for the 2024 Summer Olympics.

== Honours ==
Zambia

- COSAFA Women's Championship: 2022
