= Avell Chitundu =

Zambian footballer (born 1997)

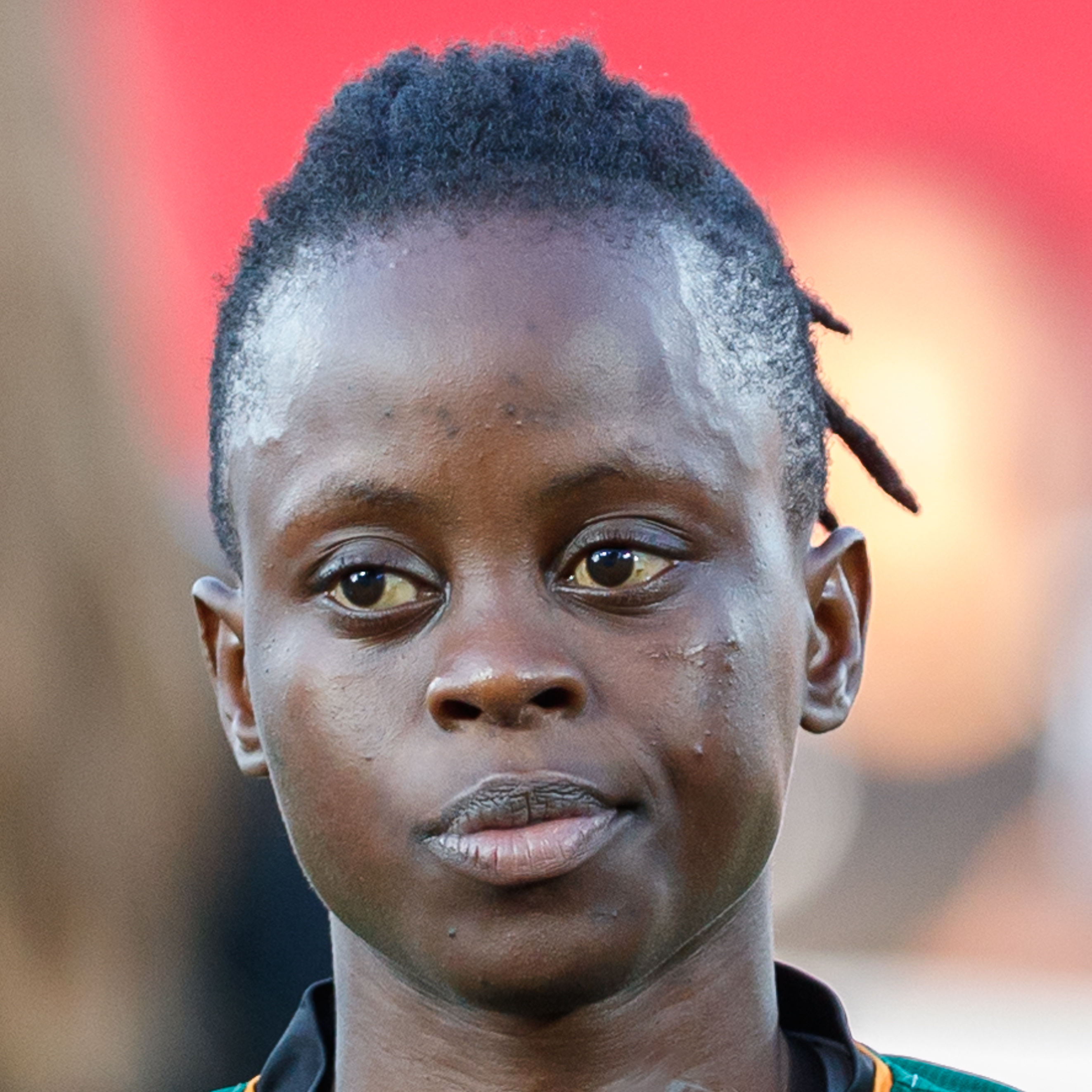

Personal information
- Date of birth: 30 July 1997 (age 29)
- Position: Forward

Team information
- Current team: ZESCO United
- Number: 21

Senior career*
Years	Team	Apps	(Gls)
- ZESCO United

International career^{‡}
2018–	Zambia	19	(3)
Medal record
Representing Zambia
Women's Africa Cup of Nations
Third place	2022 Morocco
- * Club domestic league appearances and goals ‡ National team caps and goals as of 16 June 2019

Avell Chitundu (born 30 July 1997) is a Zambian footballer who plays as a forward for the Zambia women's national team.

== Career ==
Chitundu was called up to the Zambia squad for the 2018 Women's Africa Cup of Nations. She competed for Zambia at the 2018 Africa Women Cup of Nations, playing in one match.

On 2 July 2021, Chitundu was called up to the 23-player Zambia squad for the delayed 2020 Summer Olympics.

Chitundu was called up to the Zambia squad for the 2022 Women's Africa Cup of Nations, where they finished in third place.

Chitundu was named to the Zambia squad for the 2023 FIFA Women's World Cup. This was after she had initially been left out from the squad until Zambian fans complained about her exclusion.

On 3 July 2024, Chitundu was called up to the Zambia squad for the 2024 Summer Olympics.

== International goals ==
No.	Date	Venue	Opponent	Score	Result	Competition
1.	4 December 2023	Nkoloma Stadium, Lusaka, Zambia	Angola	4–0	6–0	2024 Women's Africa Cup of Nations qualification

== Honours ==
Zambia

- COSAFA Women's Championship: 2022
