= Ngambo Musole =

Zambian footballer (born 1998)

Personal information
- Full name: Ng'ambo Petronella Musole
- Date of birth: 26 June 1998 (age 28)
- Height: 1.68 m (5 ft 6 in)
- Position: Goalkeeper

Team information
- Current team: ZESCO United

Senior career*
Years	Team	Apps	(Gls)
- Chiparamba Breakthrough
- ZESCO United

International career^{‡}
2014	Zambia U17		
2020–	Zambia	4	(0)
- * Club domestic league appearances and goals ‡ National team caps and goals as of 28 November 2020

Ng'ambo Petronella Musole (born 26 June 1998) is a Zambian footballer who plays as a goalkeeper for ZESCO United FC and the Zambia women's national team.

== Club career ==
Musole has played for Chiparamba Breakthrough and ZESCO United FC in Zambia.

== International career ==
Musole represented Zambia at the 2014 FIFA U-17 Women's World Cup. She capped at senior level on 28 November 2020 in a 1–0 friendly away win against Chile.

On 2 July 2021, Musole was called up to the 23-player Zambia squad for the delayed 2020 Summer Olympics.

On 3 July 2024, Musole was called up to the Zambia squad for the 2024 Summer Olympics.
