= Racheal Kundananji =

Zambian footballer (born 2000)

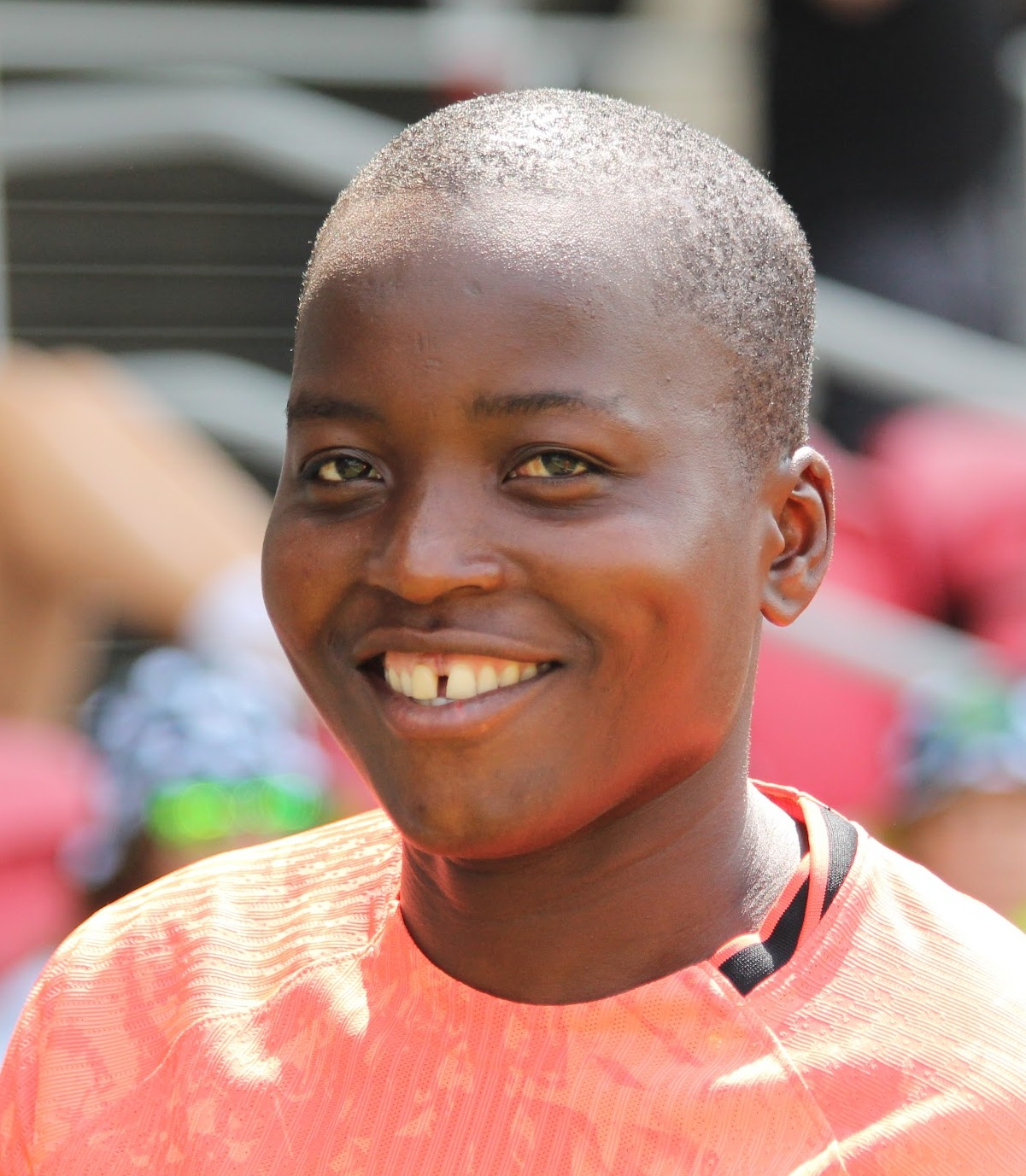
- Kundananji with Bay FC in 2026

Personal information
- Date of birth: 3 June 2000 (age 26)
- Place of birth: Zambia
- Height: 1.70 m (5 ft 7 in)
- Position: Forward

Team information
- Current team: Chicago Stars

Senior career*
Years	Team	Apps	(Gls)
2018	Indeni Roses	18	(21)
2019–2021	BIIK Kazygurt	10	(8)
2021–2022	Eibar	21	(8)
2022–2024	Madrid CFF	43	(33)
2024–2026	Bay FC	63	(12)
2026–	Chicago Stars	0	(0)

International career^{‡}
2018–	Zambia	22	(12)
2020–	Zambia Olympic	4	(3)
- * Club domestic league appearances and goals as of 8 November 2025 ‡ National team caps and goals as of 3 August 2025

Racheal Kundananji (born 3 June 2000) is a Zambian professional footballer who plays as a forward for Chicago Stars FC of the National Women's Soccer League (NWSL) and the Zambia national team. She has previously played for Copperbelt Women League club Indeni Roses, Kazakhstani women's football championship club BIIK Kazygurt, Liga F clubs SD Eibar and Madrid CFF, and Bay FC in the NWSL.

== Club career ==
Kundananji's first team was the Konkola Queens, a Chililabombwe-based club owned by a local mining company. She worked as a welder while playing for the team.

Kundananji then played for Indeni Roses in Zambia's Copperbelt Women League. She scored 21 goals in the 18 games she played helping the team win the league championship.

In 2019 at age 18, Kundananji signed her first professional contract abroad with BIIK Kazygurt in Kazakhstan and helped the team win back-to-back league championships in 2019 and 2020.

Kundananji signed with SD Eibar in the top-tier Spanish league Primera Iberdrola for the 2021–22 season. In April, she scored her first brace in the league during a 3–2 loss to Tenerife. Kundananji scored 8 goals in 21 appearances for the club.

External videos
- Kundananji's 25 goals for Madrid during the 2022–23 Liga F season retrieved 12 July 2023

In August 2022, Kundananji signed with Madrid CFF. In November, she scored a brace against Real Sociedad. Kundananji was named Madrid's Player of the Month in April 2023 after scoring a hat-trick against Alhama CF, a goal against Valencia CF, and a brace in the 2–1 upset against FC Barcelona. In May 2023, she scored a brace against Deportivo Alavés Gloriosas to lift Madrid to a 5–1 win. Kundananji scored 25 goals during the season, ranked second in the league behind only Alba Redondo with 27. Madrid finished the season in fifth place.

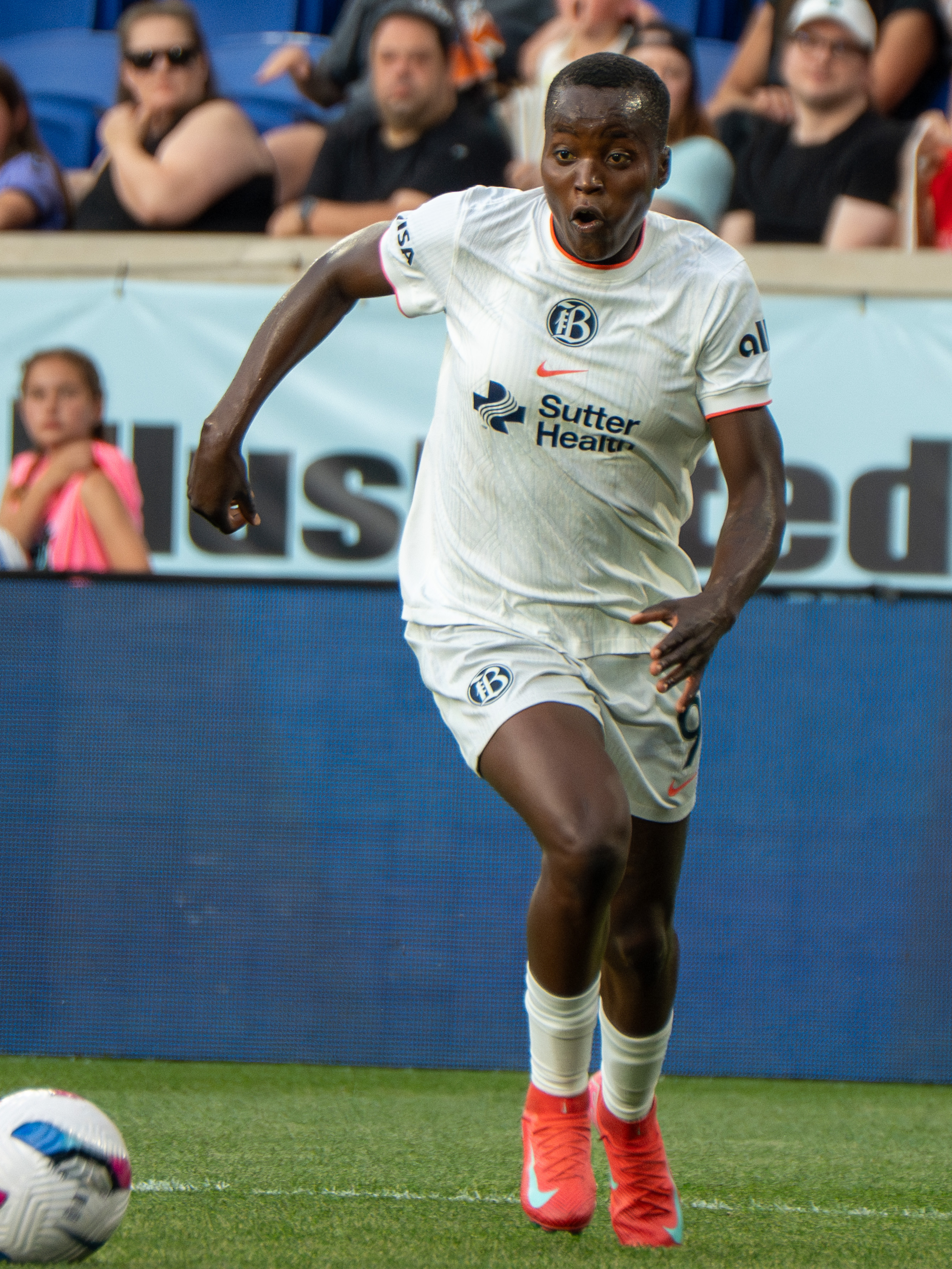
Kundananji with Bay FC in 2025

On 13 February 2024, it was announced that Kundananji had signed with Bay FC for a women's world record transfer fee of £625,000. The deal lasts until 2027, with the option to extend another year. Kundananji made her Bay FC debut as a substitute in the 62nd minute on 30 March 2024, in the team's home debut against the Houston Dash. She scored her first goal for the club in the same match, an equalizer in the 93rd minute of an eventual loss. She was the first Zambian to play in an NWSL match as well as the first to score a goal in NWSL. Over nearly three seasons with Bay FC, Kundananji appeared in 63 NWSL regular-season matches and became the club's leading goalscorer, with 12.

On 8 October 2026, Kundananji was traded to the Chicago Stars in exchange for a transfer fee of US$700,000.

== International career ==
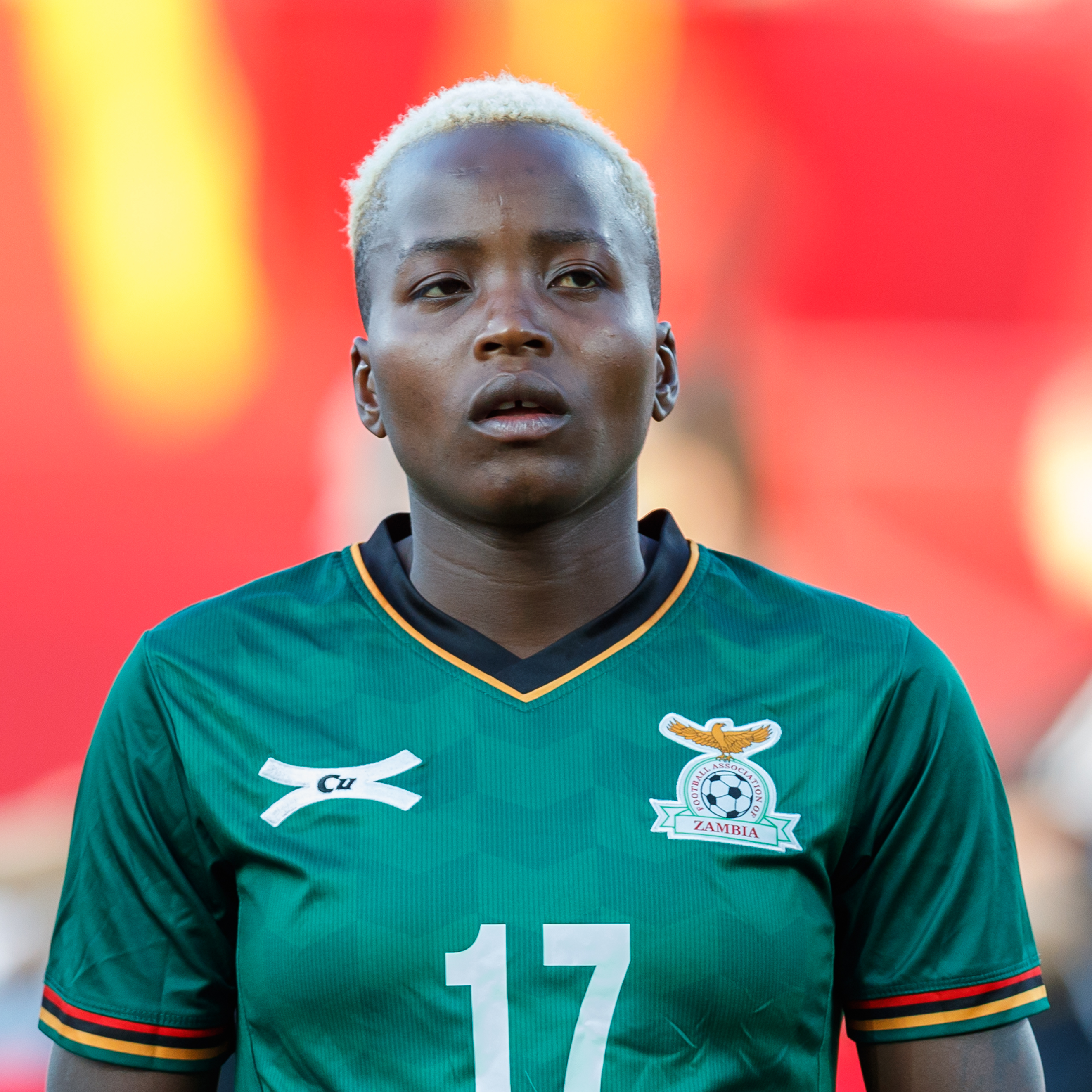
Kundananji with Zambia in 2023

Kundananji represented Zambia at the 2018 Africa Women Cup of Nations, the qualifying tournament for the 2019 FIFA Women's World Cup. She scored three goals at the tournament, including a brace against Equatorial Guinea.

In 2020, Kundananji competed at the CAF Women's Olympic Qualifying Tournament and helped the team secure their first-ever berth to the 2020 Summer Olympics in Japan after winning the tournament. Named to Zambia's roster for the Olympics (delayed to 2021 due to the COVID-19 pandemic), Kundananji scored a goal and provided an assist on Zambia's third goal against China in a thrilling 4–4 draw. Though the team did not advance out of group stage during their first Olympic tournament, Zambian president Edgar Lungu said he was proud of the team: "One word that describes their performance today [Tuesday] is resilience. Despite the red card and a nasty injury to our goalkeeper, the girls remained resilient against a strong opponent. You are the quintessence of hard work, which is the true Zambian spirit."

On 6 July 2022, Kundananji, and three other teammates, including striker Barbra Banda, were ruled ineligible to compete for Zambia in the World Cup-qualifying tournament, Africa Cup of Nations, after a gender verification test found that their natural testosterone levels were above those allowed by the Confederation of African Football, which had stricter gender verification rules than the Olympics. The ruling sparked significant controversy, with Human Rights Watch describing it as a "clear violation" of human rights.

External videos
- Kundananji's goal against Germany in 2–3 upset retrieved 12 July 2023

On 1 July 2023, Kundananji scored a goal and provided an assist in Zambia's 3–3 draw against #20 FIFA-ranked Switzerland. Two days later she was named to Zambia's squad for the 2023 FIFA Women's World Cup in New Zealand and Australia. A few days later, she scored a goal against Germany in a 3–2 upset win against the two-time World Cup champions.

On 3 July 2024, Kundananji was called up to the Zambia squad for the 2024 Summer Olympics.

== Career statistics ==
Scores and results list Zambia's goal tally first, score column indicates score after each Kundananji goal.

List of international goals scored by Racheal Kundananji
No.	Date	Venue	Opponent	Score	Result	Competition
1	3 November 2018	Nkoloma Stadium, Lusaka, Zambia	Ghana	1–2	3–2	Friendly
2	3 November 2018	Nkoloma Stadium, Lusaka, Zambia	Ghana	2–2	3–2	Friendly
3	3 November 2018	Nkoloma Stadium, Lusaka, Zambia	Ghana	3–2	3–2	Friendly
4	18 November 2018	Cape Coast Sports Stadium, Cape Coast, Ghana	Equatorial Guinea	3–0	5–0	2018 Africa Women Cup of Nations
5	18 November 2018	Cape Coast Sports Stadium, Cape Coast, Ghana	Equatorial Guinea	5–0	5–0	2018 Africa Women Cup of Nations
6	24 November 2018	Accra Sports Stadium, Accra, Ghana	South Africa	1–1	1–1	2018 Africa Women Cup of Nations
7	28 August 2019	Nkoloma Stadium, Lusaka, Zambia	Zimbabwe	5–0	5–0	2020 CAF Women's Olympic Qualifying Tournament
8	8 November 2019	Moi International Sports Centre, Kasarani, Kenya	Kenya	2–2	2–2	2020 CAF Women's Olympic Qualifying Tournament
9	24 July 2021	Miyagi Stadium, Rifu, Japan	China	1–1	4–4	2020 Summer Olympics
10	26 October 2021	Nkoloma Stadium, Lusaka, Zambia	Malawi	1–1	3–2	2022 Women's Africa Cup of Nations qualification
11	26 October 2021	Nkoloma Stadium, Lusaka, Zambia	Malawi	2–1	3–2	2022 Women's Africa Cup of Nations qualification
12	22 June 2023	Tallaght Stadium, Dublin, Ireland	Republic of Ireland	2–3	2–3	Friendly
13	30 June 2023	Tissot Arena, Biel/Bienne, Switzerland	Switzerland	3–1	3–3	Friendly
14	7 July 2023	Sportpark Ronhof Thomas Sommer, Fürth, Germany	Germany	2–0	3–2	Friendly
15	31 July 2023	Wellington Regional Stadium, Wellington, New Zealand	Costa Rica	3–1	3–1	2023 FIFA Women's World Cup
16	26 September 2023	Moulay Hassan Stadium, Rabat, Morocco	Morocco	1–0	6–2	Friendly
17	26 September 2023	Moulay Hassan Stadium, Rabat, Morocco	Morocco	2–1	6–2	Friendly
18	26 September 2023	Moulay Hassan Stadium, Rabat, Morocco	Morocco	6–2	6–2	Friendly
19	29 November 2023	Estádio 22 de Junho, Luanda, Angola	Angola	6–0	6–0	2024 Women's Africa Cup of Nations qualification
20	5 December 2023	Nkoloma Stadium, Lusaka, Zambia	Angola	1–0	6–0	2024 Women's Africa Cup of Nations qualification
21	5 December 2023	Nkoloma Stadium, Lusaka, Zambia	Angola	6–0	6–0	2024 Women's Africa Cup of Nations qualification
22	23 February 2024	Accra Sports Stadium, Accra, Ghana	Ghana	1–0	1–0	2024 CAF Women's Olympic Qualifying Tournament
23	28 July 2024	Stade de Nice, Nice, France	Australia	2–1	5–6	2024 Summer Olympics
24	28 July 2024	Stade de Nice, Nice, France	Australia	5–2	5–6	2024 Summer Olympics
25	23 February 2025	REIZ Arena, Lusaka, Zambia	Malawi	2–0	2–0	Friendly
26	25 February 2025	REIZ Arena, Lusaka, Zambia	Malawi	1–0	2–3	Friendly
27	5 July 2025	Olympic Stadium, Rabat, Morocco	Morocco	2–1	2–2	2024 Women's Africa Cup of Nations
28	9 July 2025	Olympic Stadium, Rabat, Morocco	Senegal	2–1	3–2	2024 Women's Africa Cup of Nations
29	12 July 2025	El Bachir Stadium, Mohammedia, Morocco	DR Congo	1–0	1–0	2024 Women's Africa Cup of Nations
30	22 October 2025	Dobsonville Stadium, Johannesburg, South Africa	Namibia	1–0	4–2	2026 Women's Africa Cup of Nations qualification
31	22 October 2025	Dobsonville Stadium, Johannesburg, South Africa	Namibia	3–2	4–2	2026 Women's Africa Cup of Nations qualification
32	22 October 2025	Dobsonville Stadium, Johannesburg, South Africa	Namibia	4–2	4–2	2026 Women's Africa Cup of Nations qualification
33	26 October 2025	Levy Mwanawasa Stadium, Ndola, Zambia	Namibia	1–0	3–0	2026 Women's Africa Cup of Nations qualification

== See also ==
- List of foreign Liga F players
