= Esther Siamfuko =

Zambian footballer (born 2004)

Esther
Personal information
- Full name: Esther Siamfuko
- Date of birth: 8 August 2004 (age 22)
- Place of birth: Choma
- Position: Defender

Team information
- Current team: Queens Academy (on loan from Choma Warriors)
- Number: 10

Senior career*
Years	Team	Apps	(Gls)
	Choma Warriors	20	(40)
2020–	→ Queens Academy (loan)		

International career^{‡}
- Zambia U17
2020–	Zambia	7	(0)
Medal record
Representing Zambia
Women's Africa Cup of Nations
Third place	2022 Morocco
- * Club domestic league appearances and goals ‡ National team caps and goals as of 28 November 2020

Esther Siamfuko (born 8 August 2004) is a Zambian footballer who plays as a defender for Queens Academy, on loan from Choma Warriors, and the Zambia women's national team.

== Club career ==
Siamfuko has played for Choma Warriors and Queens Academy in Zambia.

== International career ==
Siamfuko represented Zambia at the 2020 COSAFA Women's U17 Championship. She capped at senior level on 28 November 2020 in a 1–0 friendly away win against Chile.

On 2 July 2021, Siamfuko was called up to the 23-player Zambia squad for the delayed 2020 Summer Olympics.

Siamfuko was called up to the Zambia squad for the 2022 Women's Africa Cup of Nations, where they finished in third place.

On 3 July 2024, Siamfuko was called up to the Zambia squad for the 2024 Summer Olympics.

== Honours ==
Zambia

- COSAFA Women's Championship: 2022
