= Catherine Musonda =

Zambian footballer (born 1998)

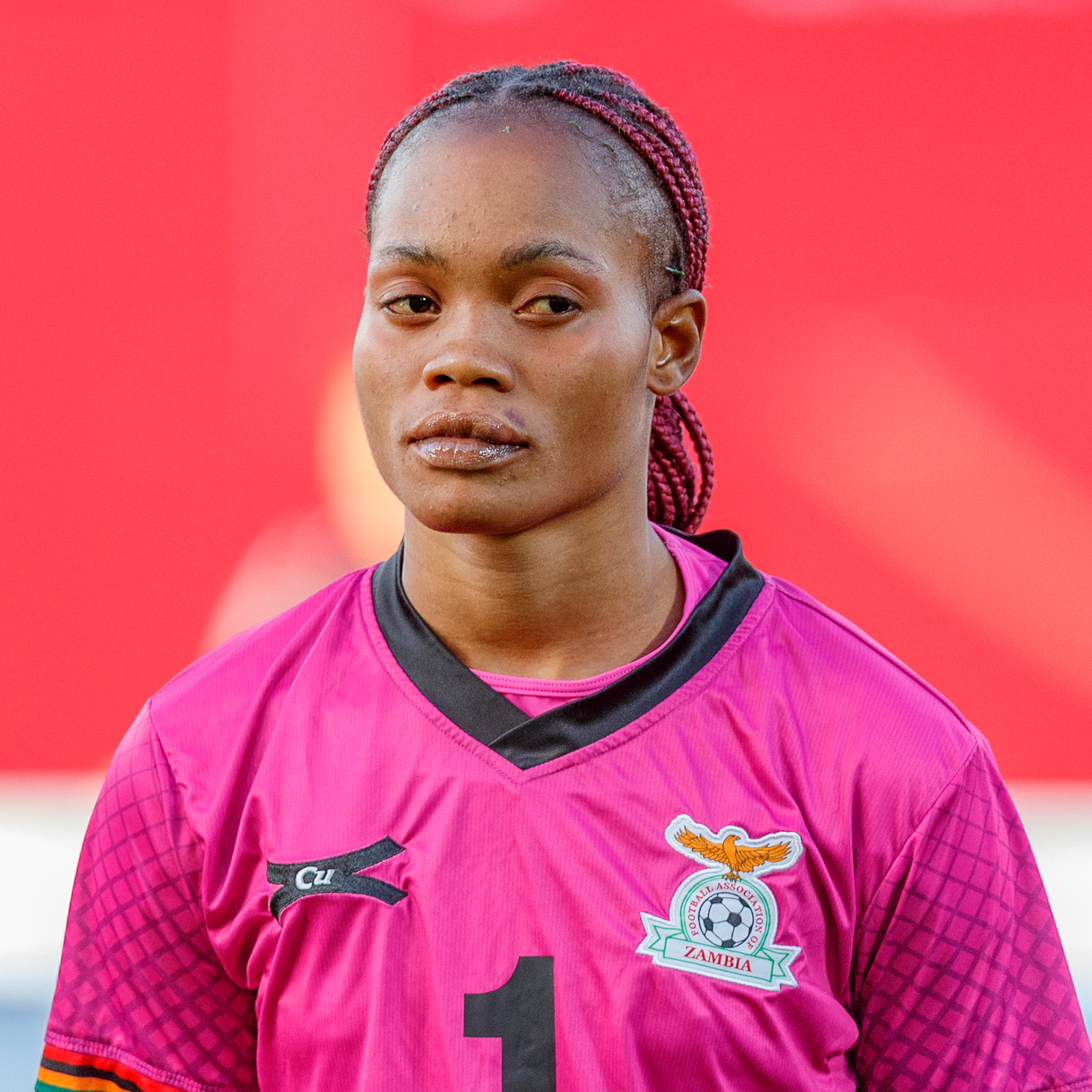

Personal information
- Date of birth: 20 February 1998 (age 28)
- Place of birth: Zambia
- Height: 1.70 m (5 ft 7 in)
- Position: Goalkeeper

Team information
- Current team: Indeni Roses

Senior career*
Years	Team	Apps	(Gls)
2018–2019	ZESCO United		
2020–	Indeni Roses		

International career
2018–	Zambia	8	(0)
Medal record
Representing Zambia
Women's Africa Cup of Nations
Third place	2022 Morocco
- * Club domestic league appearances and goals

Catherine Musonda (born 20 February 1998) is a Zambian women's professional footballer who plays as a goalkeeper for ZESCO United and the Zambia women's national team.

== International career ==
Musonda was called up to the Zambia squad for the 2018 Women's Africa Cup of Nations.

On 2 July 2021, Musonda was called up to the 23-player Zambia squad for the delayed 2020 Summer Olympics.

Musonda was called up to the Zambia squad for the 2022 Women's Africa Cup of Nations, where they finished in third place.

Musonda was part of the Zambia squad for the 2023 FIFA Women's World Cup.

On 3 July 2024, Musonda was called up to the Zambia squad for the 2024 Summer Olympics.

== Honours ==
Zambia

- COSAFA Women's Championship: 2022

Individual

- COSAFA Women's Championship Best Goalkeeper: 2022
