= Lynn Biyendolo =

American soccer player (born 1993)

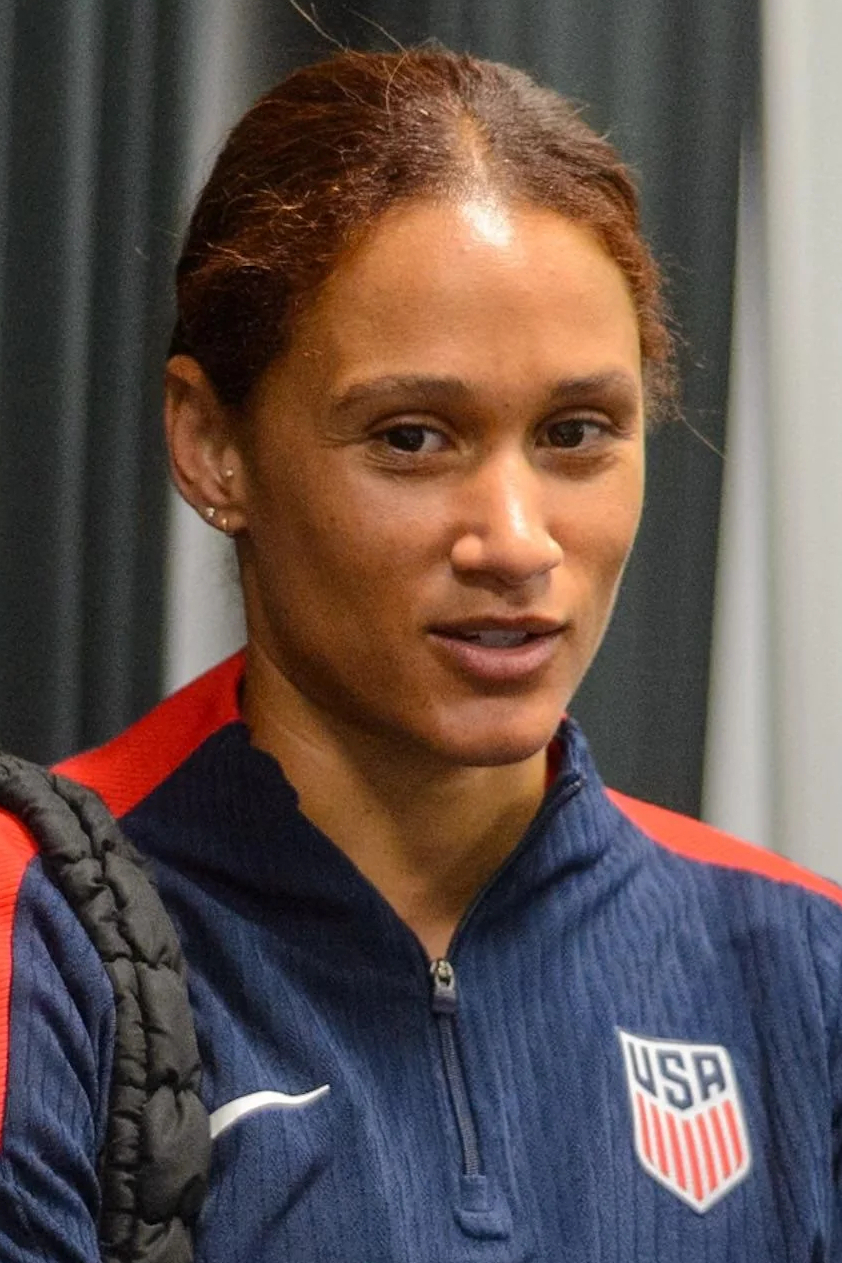
- Biyendolo with the United States in 2025

Personal information
- Birth name: Lynn Raenie Williams
- Date of birth: May 21, 1993 (age 33)
- Place of birth: Fresno, California, United States
- Height: 1.70 m (5 ft 7 in)
- Position: Forward

Team information
- Current team: Seattle Reign
- Number: 6

College career
Years	Team	Apps	(Gls)
2011–2014	Pepperdine Waves	78	(39)

Senior career*
Years	Team	Apps	(Gls)
—2010	Pali Blues		
2015–2016	Western New York Flash	36	(15)
2017–2021	North Carolina Courage	81	(42)
2019–2020	→ Western Sydney Wanderers (loan)	5	(4)
2021–2022	→ Melbourne Victory (loan)	4	(3)
2022	Kansas City Current	0	(0)
2023–2024	NJ/NY Gotham FC	40	(12)
2025–	Seattle Reign	13	(2)

International career^{‡}
2013–2015	United States U23		
2016–	United States	83	(25)
Medal record
Women's soccer
Representing the United States
Olympic Games
Gold medal – first place	2024 Paris	Team
Bronze medal – third place	2020 Tokyo	Team
CONCACAF W Gold Cup
Winner	2024 United States
- * Club domestic league appearances and goals as of November 1, 2025 ‡ National team caps and goals as of July 2, 2025

Lynn Biyendolo /ˌbijɛnˈdoʊloʊ/ (born Lynn Raenie Williams; May 21, 1993) is an American professional soccer player who plays as a forward for Seattle Reign FC of the National Women's Soccer League (NWSL) and the United States national team. The NWSL's all-time leading scorer, she was drafted out of Pepperdine University by the Western New York Flash in 2015.

Biyendolo won the NWSL's Most Valuable Player award and her first NWSL Championship with the Flash in 2016. After the franchise moved to become the North Carolina Courage, she helped lead North Carolina to three consecutive NWSL Shields and two Championships in 2018 and 2019. After five seasons in North Carolina, she was traded to the Kansas City Current and then flipped to NJ/NY Gotham FC, where she won her fourth championship in 2023.

Biyendolo made her international debut for the United States in 2016. She has won two Olympic medals with the team, receiving bronze at Tokyo 2020 and gold at Paris 2024.

== Early life ==
Born in Fresno, California to Christine and David Williams, Biyendolo attended Bullard High School where she played on the varsity team and earned all-league and all-area honors all four years. She set the school record in scoring with 117 career goals (for boys or girls) and finished her high school career with 47 assists. As a senior in 2011, she was named to the ESPN RISE All-American third team and scored 50 goals. The same year, she helped the team to win county and section titles and was the runner-up at the regional final. She was also named Player of the Year by the Fresno Bee.

=== Pepperdine Waves, 2011–2014 ===
Biyendolo attended Pepperdine University from 2011 to 2014 where she played for the Waves. During her freshman season, she started in all 20 games and finished third on the team with six goals and led the Waves with eight assists. Her 20 points ranked second on the team. She was named West Coast Conference (WCC) Freshman of the Year and earned Soccer America Freshman All-American first team, NSCAA All-West Region second team, All-WCC second team and WCC All-Freshman team honors. Biyendolo set a new school record of five consecutive games with a point and tied for second with two multi-assist games.

As a sophomore in 2012, Biyendolo led the Waves ranked third on the team and sixth in the league in goals (8) and points (19). She led the WCC in shots (97) and shots per game (4.6) for the second consecutive season. She scored her first collegiate hat trick on October 23. Her season performance earned her NSCAA All-West Region and All-WCC first team and All-WCC first team honors. In 2013, Biyendolo started the first 15 games of the season and posted 11 goals and 3 assists (25 points) before missing the last few games due to injury. She ranked first in the WCC for goals per game (0.73, also third in the school's history), tied for second in game-winning goals and third in points per game (1.67, also fourth in the school's history). She set a school single-game record for shots with 14 on September 22. Biyendolo earned NSCAA All-West Region first team and All-WCC first team honors and was named the National Player of the Week by the NSCAA and CollegeSoccer360.com after scoring the game-winning goal against Wright State in August and then netting two goals and an assist against Texas A&M in early September. She was also named WCC Player of the Week.

Biyendolo led the Waves with 14 goals and 10 assists in 22 starts during her senior season. Her performance helped lift the team to the third Sweet 16 appearance in the program's history. She was a finalist for the Hermann Trophy, was named first-team All-American by the NSCAA and Soccer America as well as All-WCC first team for the third straight year. Her 14 goals ranked third in the WCC and tied for second highest in the school's history. Her 38 points also ranked second in the school's history. Biyendolo set a new school record for shots with 130 and ranked first in the WCC. She was named WCC Player of the Week three times and Top Drawer Soccer National Player of the Week after scoring two game-winning goals.

== Club career ==
=== Western New York Flash, 2015–2016 ===
Biyendolo was selected sixth overall by the Western New York Flash during the 2015 NWSL College Draft. She made her debut for the club during the team's season opener against the Seattle Reign FC on April 12, 2015. In her 17 appearances during the season, Biyendolo scored four goals. The Flash finished in seventh place with a 6–9–5 record.

Biyendolo was one of the breakout stars of the 2016 NWSL season. She scored 11 goals which was tied with Houston Dash forward Kealia Ohai for most in the league. Biyendolo was awarded the Golden Boot as she had more assists then Ohai. Biyendolo was named the 2016 NWSL Most Valuable Player and was in the 2016 NWSL Best XI. In the playoffs Biyendolo scored two goals in extra time as the Flash upset the Portland Thorns in the semifinal and advanced to the Championship Game. In the 2016 NWSL Championship Biyendolo scored a game-tying header in the last minute of extra time to force the game to penalties. Biyendolo converted her penalty as the Flash went on to defeat the Washington Spirit.

=== North Carolina Courage, 2017–2021 ===
It was announced on January 9, 2017, that the Western New York Flash was officially sold to new ownership, moved to North Carolina, and rebranded as the North Carolina Courage. Biyendolo scored 9 goals for North Carolina in 2017 and was named to the Team of the Month for April. North Carolina won the Shield in 2017 but lost to the Portland Thorns in the NWSL Championship Game.

Biyendolo had a very successful 2018 season. She scored 14 goals, which was tied for second best in the league. She was named Player of the Week twice as was named to the NWSL Second XI. North Carolina won its second straight NWSL Shield and Biyendolo was named a finalist for NWSL Most Valuable Player. She played every minute of North Carolina's playoff games in 2018 as the Courage won the 2018 NWSL Championship by defeating the Portland Thorns 3–0 in the final.

==== Loan to Western Sydney Wanderers ====
In October 2019, Biyendolo travelled to Australia to join W-League club Western Sydney Wanderers on loan. In February 2020, she terminated her contract early to focus on her international career.

==== Loan to Melbourne Victory ====
In December 2021, Biyendolo returned to Australia, signing with Melbourne Victory as a guest player on a month-long loan. Her loan ended on January 13, 2022.

=== Kansas City Current, 2022 ===
On January 10, 2022, Biyendolo was traded to the Kansas City Current from the North Carolina Courage for $200,000 in allocation money, the rights to goalkeeper Katelyn Rowland and a first-round pick in the 2023 NWSL Draft. This reunited Biyendolo with former Courage teammates Sam Mewis, Kristen Hamilton, and Hailie Mace.

Biyendolo was injured on March 18, 2022, suffering a right leg injury, missing the entirety of the 2022 NWSL season.

=== Gotham FC, 2023–2024 ===
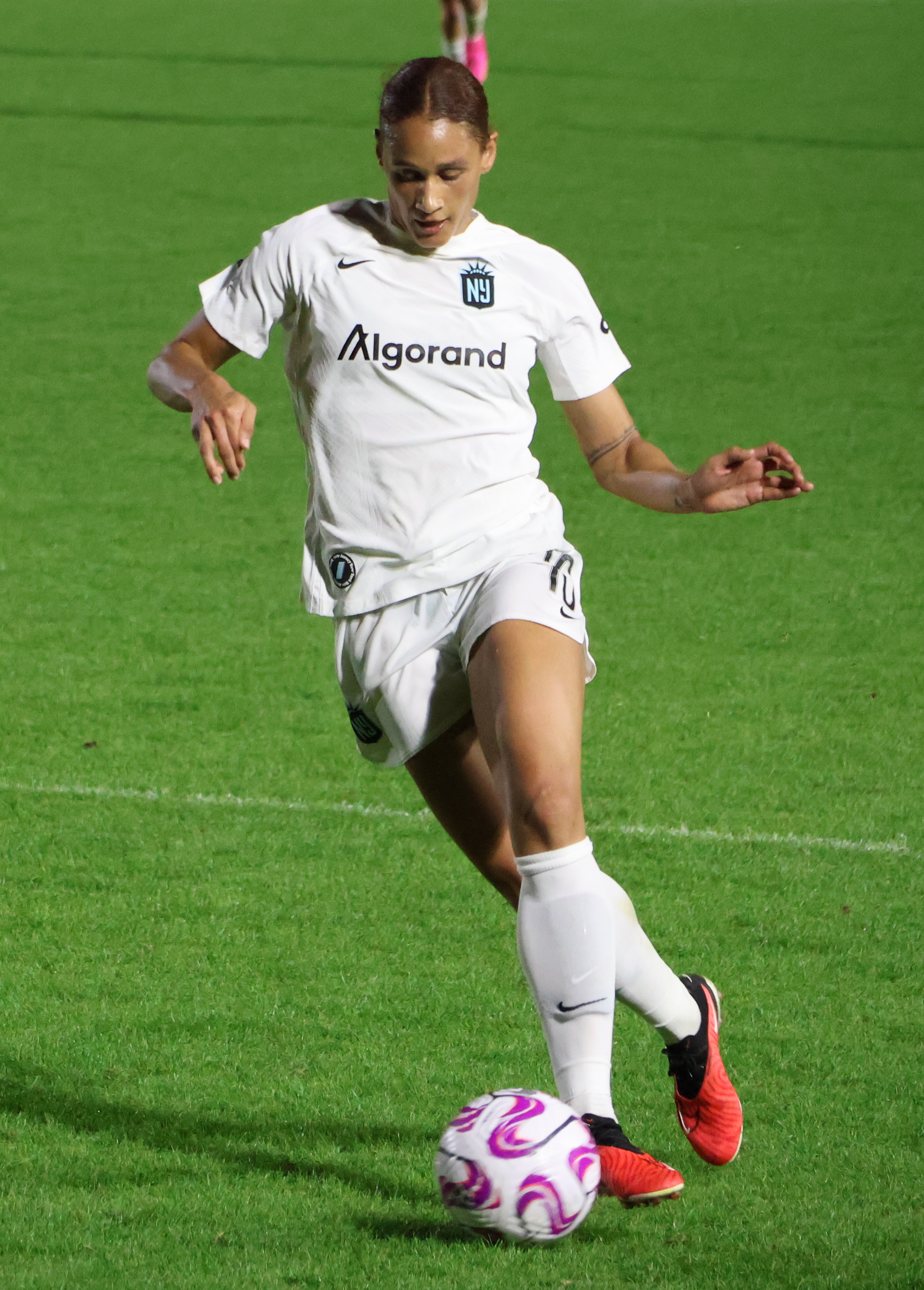
Biyendolo with Gotham in 2023

On January 12, 2023, during the NWSL Draft, Biyendolo was traded by the Kansas City Current to Gotham FC in exchange for the 2nd pick overall pick. She opened scoring against OL Reign in the championship game to help her team win 2–1, becoming the league's first four-time champion.

Biyendolo scored her 79th NWSL goal on May 19, 2024, heading in the ball against the Chicago Red Stars, to pass Sam Kerr as the league's all-time leading scorer.

=== Seattle Reign FC, 2025– ===
On December 20, 2024, Biyendolo joined Seattle Reign as part of a trade that also saw Cassie Miller move to Seattle and Jaelin Howell join Gotham.

== International career ==
After a breakout 2016 NWSL season Biyendolo received her first call-up to the United States women's national team in October 2016 for a pair of friendlies against Switzerland. She earned her first cap on October 19. Biyendolo entered as a substitute at the beginning of the second half and scored the fastest debut goal in team history as she scored 49 seconds after entering the game. Her record was broken four days later when Kealia Ohai scored 48 seconds after entering the game.

In 2017 Biyendolo was named to the roster for the 2017 SheBelieves Cup, where she scored the game-winning goal in a 1–0 win for the U.S. over Germany. Her goal was the only one the U.S. scored in the tournament as they finished in last place. Biyendolo was called up for the 2017 Tournament of Nations.

In 2018 Biyendolo was named to the roster for the 2018 SheBelieves Cup, where the U.S. WNT won the tournament for the second time. Biyendolo played in the team's first four games of the year including all three SheBelieves Cup games, but soon fell off the national team radar. She received a call-up for a pair of friendlies against Mexico in April 2018, but didn't play in either game. Biyendolo was on the 35-player provisional roster for the 2018 CONCACAF Women's Championship but wasn't named to the final 20-player roster.

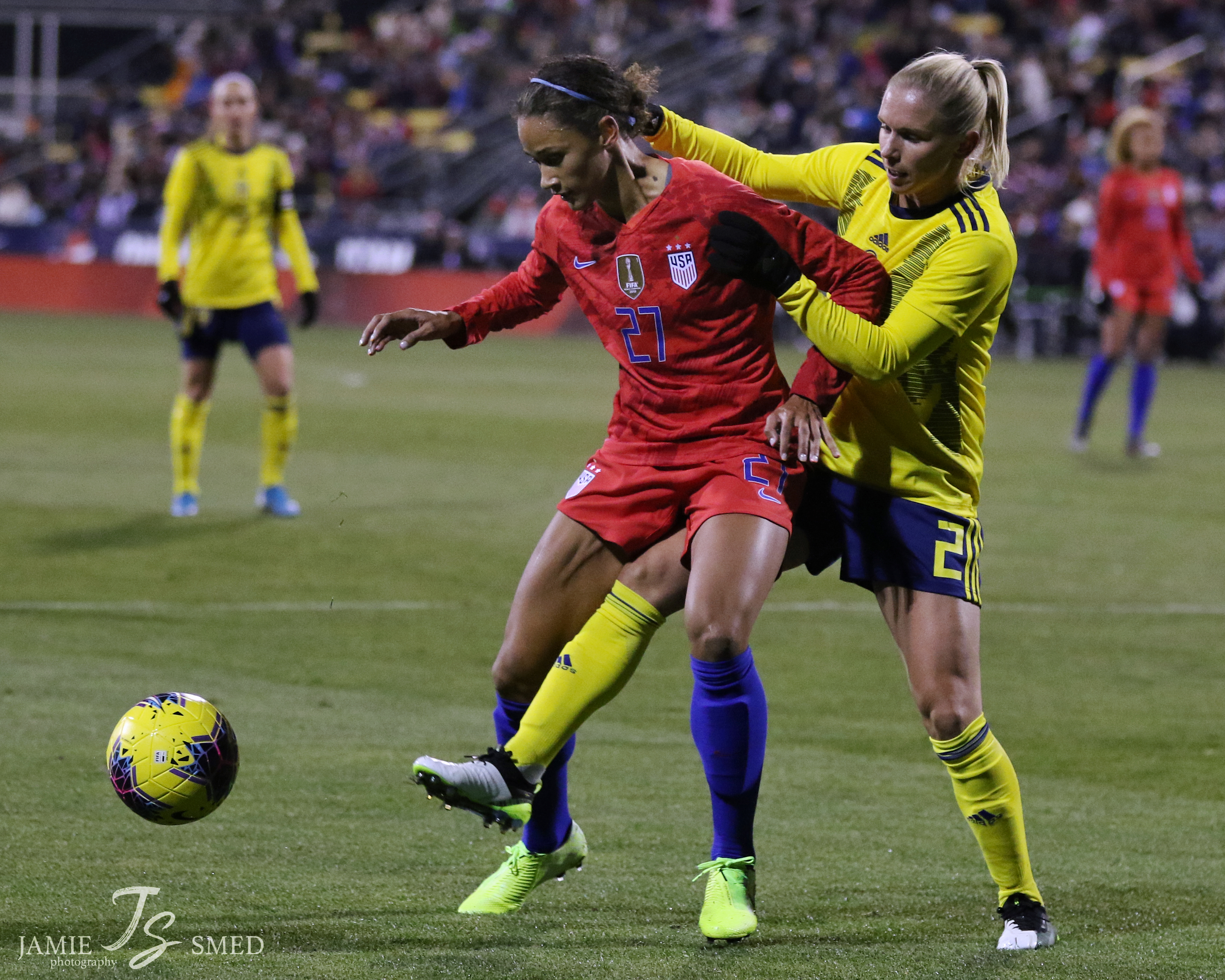
Biyendolo during a match against Sweden, November 2019

In late 2019, after incoming head coach Vlatko Andonovski took over for a retiring Jill Ellis, Biyendolo was again called up to the national team. She played in both of the team's November friendlies against Sweden and Costa Rica, marking her first caps in 20 months. In her first five games back with the team, including the CONCACAF Olympic qualifying tournament, Biyendolo tallied five goals and five assists.

On June 23, 2021, Biyendolo was included on the roster for the United States at the 2020 Summer Olympics.

On July 12, 2024, it was announced that Biyendolo would replace Catarina Macario on the roster for the 2024 Summer Olympics after initially being named an alternate. In USA's 2nd game of the Olympics, facing Germany, Biyendolo was subbed on in the 2nd half where she scored the team's fourth goal of their 4-1 victory. She appeared as a substitute in the gold medal game against Brazil, which the United States won 1–0 on a goal from Mallory Swanson.

== Personal life ==
=== Marriage and family ===
Biyendolo met her husband, Marley Biyendolo, at Pepperdine. They married on December 8, 2024. Lynn started using her married name in 2025.

At NWSL Media Day in January 2025, Biyendolo said about using her married name: "In the Congo, in African culture, sometimes you are gifted a name, you're gifted the last name. Clotaire, my father-in-law, his sister's last name is different than his last name, so moving forward he decided, 'I'm going to continue on and have my family have my same last name,' so Marley, my husband, and his brother have, obviously, Biyendolo as their last name. "I think it's very cool and special. Besides only one other family in the Congo, any Biyendolo out there will be related to me and my husband and my in-laws, so that's very cool, and I do think that as cool as the Williams name is, the history of it – obviously, some slave owners at some point had that, so I think it's a very cool tradition to be able to take such a special name that was gifted to my father-in-law and have it on the back of my jersey but also have it be a part of me and part of my family, and that's the family I chose to be in."

On October 25, 2025, the couple announced on Instagram that they were expecting their first child.

=== Podcast ===
Biyendolo and Sam Mewis hosted a podcast about women's soccer, Snacks, produced by Just Women's Sports, from April 2021 to November 2023.

=== Television and film ===
Biyendolo appeared in a Netflix documentary series that followed the USWNT as they competed in the 2023 FIFA Women's World Cup. The docuseries premiered in the autumn of 2023.

== Career statistics ==
=== Club ===
As of match played May 23, 2025

Club	Season	League			Cup (Note: Includes the NWSL Challenge Cup)		Playoffs (Note: Includes NWSL Playoffs and A-League Finals series)		Other (Note: Includes the CONCACAF W Champions Cup)		Total	
Club	Season	Division	Apps	Goals	Apps	Goals	Apps	Goals	Apps	Goals	Apps	Goals
Western New York Flash	2015	NWSL	17	4	—		—		—		17	4
Western New York Flash	2016	NWSL	19	11	—		2	3	—		21	14
Western New York Flash	Total		36	15	—		2	3	—		38	18
North Carolina Courage	2017	NWSL	21	9	—		2	0	—		23	9
North Carolina Courage	2018	NWSL	21	14	—		2	0	—		23	14
North Carolina Courage	2019	NWSL	22	12	—		2	0	—		24	12
North Carolina Courage	2020	NWSL	—		5	3	—		4 (Note: Includes the NWSL Fall Series)	3	9	6
North Carolina Courage	2021	NWSL	17	7	3	0	1	0	—		21	7
North Carolina Courage	Total		81	42	8	3	7	0	4	3	100	48
Western Sydney Wanderers (loan)	2019–20	A-League	5	4	—		0	0	—		5	4
Melbourne Victory (loan)	2021–22	A-League	4	3	—		0	0	—		4	3
Kansas City Current	2022	NWSL	0	0	1	0	0	0	—		1	0
NJ/NY Gotham FC	2023	NWSL	17	7	2	2	3	1	—		22	10
NJ/NY Gotham FC	2024	NWSL	16	4	0	0	2	0	3	3	21	7
NJ/NY Gotham FC	Total		33	11	2	2	5	1	3	3	43	17
Seattle Reign FC	2025	NWSL	7	1	0	0	0	0	0	0	7	1
Career total			166	76	11	5	14	4	7	6	138	91

=== International ===
As of match played July 2, 2025

National team	Year	Apps	Goals
United States
United States	2016	4	1
United States	2017	11	3
United States	2018	4	0
United States	2019	2	2
United States	2020	8	3
United States	2021	16	5
United States	2022	2	0
United States	2023	12	3
United States	2024	16	4
United States	2025	8	4
Total		83	25

Scores and results list United States's goal tally first, score column indicates score after each Biyendolo goal.

List of international goals scored by Lynn Biyendolo
No.	Date	Venue	Opponent	Score	Result	Competition	Ref.
1	October 19, 2016	Sandy, Utah	Switzerland	1–0	4–0	Friendly	
2	March 1, 2017	Chester, Pennsylvania	Germany	1–0	1–0	2017 SheBelieves Cup	
3	September 19, 2017	Cincinnati, Ohio	New Zealand	4–0	5–0	Friendly	
4	October 22, 2017	Cary, North Carolina	South Korea	5–0	6–0	Friendly	
5	November 10, 2019	Jacksonville, Florida	Costa Rica	3–0	6–0	Friendly	
6	November 10, 2019	Jacksonville, Florida	Costa Rica	5–0	6–0	Friendly	
7	January 28, 2020	Houston, Texas	Haiti	2–0	4–0	2020 CONCACAF Olympic Qualifying – Group Stage	
8	January 31, 2020	Houston, Texas	Panama	2–0	8–0	2020 CONCACAF Olympic Qualifying – Group Stage	
9	February 9, 2020	Carson, California	Canada	1–0	3–0	2020 CONCACAF Olympic Qualifying – Final	
10	January 22, 2021	Orlando, Florida	Colombia	4–0	6–0	Friendly	
11	June 16, 2021	Austin, Texas	Nigeria	2–0	2–0	Friendly	
12	July 30, 2021	Yokohama, Japan	Netherlands	2–1	2–2 (a.e.t.) (4–2 p)	2020 Summer Olympics – Quarterfinal	
13	September 16, 2021	Cleveland, Ohio	Paraguay	4–0	9–0	Friendly	
14	October 26, 2021	Saint Paul, Minnesota	South Korea	6–0	6–0	Friendly	
15	January 18, 2023	Wellington, New Zealand	New Zealand	4–0	4–0	Friendly	
16	September 21, 2023	Cincinnati, Ohio	South Africa	1–0	3–0	Friendly	
17	September 21, 2023	Cincinnati, Ohio	South Africa	3–0	3–0	Friendly	
18	February 20, 2024	Carson, California	Dominican Republic	2–0	5–0	2024 CONCACAF Gold Cup – Group Stage	
19	July 28, 2024	Marseille, France	Germany	4–1	4–1	2024 Summer Olympics – Group Stage	
20	October 27, 2024	Nashville, Tennessee	Iceland	1–1	3–1	Friendly	
21	December 3, 2024	The Hague, Netherlands	Netherlands	2–1	2–1	Friendly	
22	January 23, 2025	Glendale, Arizona	Australia	1–0	2–1	2025 SheBelieves Cup	
23	June 4, 2025	St. Louis, Missouri	Jamaica	3–0	4–0	Friendly	
24	June 4, 2025	St. Louis, Missouri	Jamaica	4–0	4–0	Friendly	
25	June 29, 2025	Cincinnati, Ohio	Republic of Ireland	1–0	4–0	Friendly	

== Honors and awards ==
Western New York Flash

- NWSL Championship: 2016

North Carolina Courage

- NWSL Championship: 2018, 2019
- NWSL Shield: 2017, 2018, 2019

NJ/NY Gotham FC

- NWSL Championship: 2023

United States

- Summer Olympic Games Gold Medal: 2024
- CONCACAF W Gold Cup: 2024
- SheBelieves Cup: 2018; 2020, 2021; 2022, 2023
- CONCACAF Women's Olympic Qualifying Tournament: 2020
- Olympic Bronze Medal: 2020

Individual

- NWSL Golden Boot: 2016
- NWSL Most Valuable Player: 2016
- NWSL Best XI: 2016, 2023
- NWSL Second XI: 2018
- Hermann Trophy finalist: 2014

== See also ==
- List of American and Canadian soccer champions
- List of foreign A-League Women players
