= Sam Mewis =

American soccer player (born 1992)

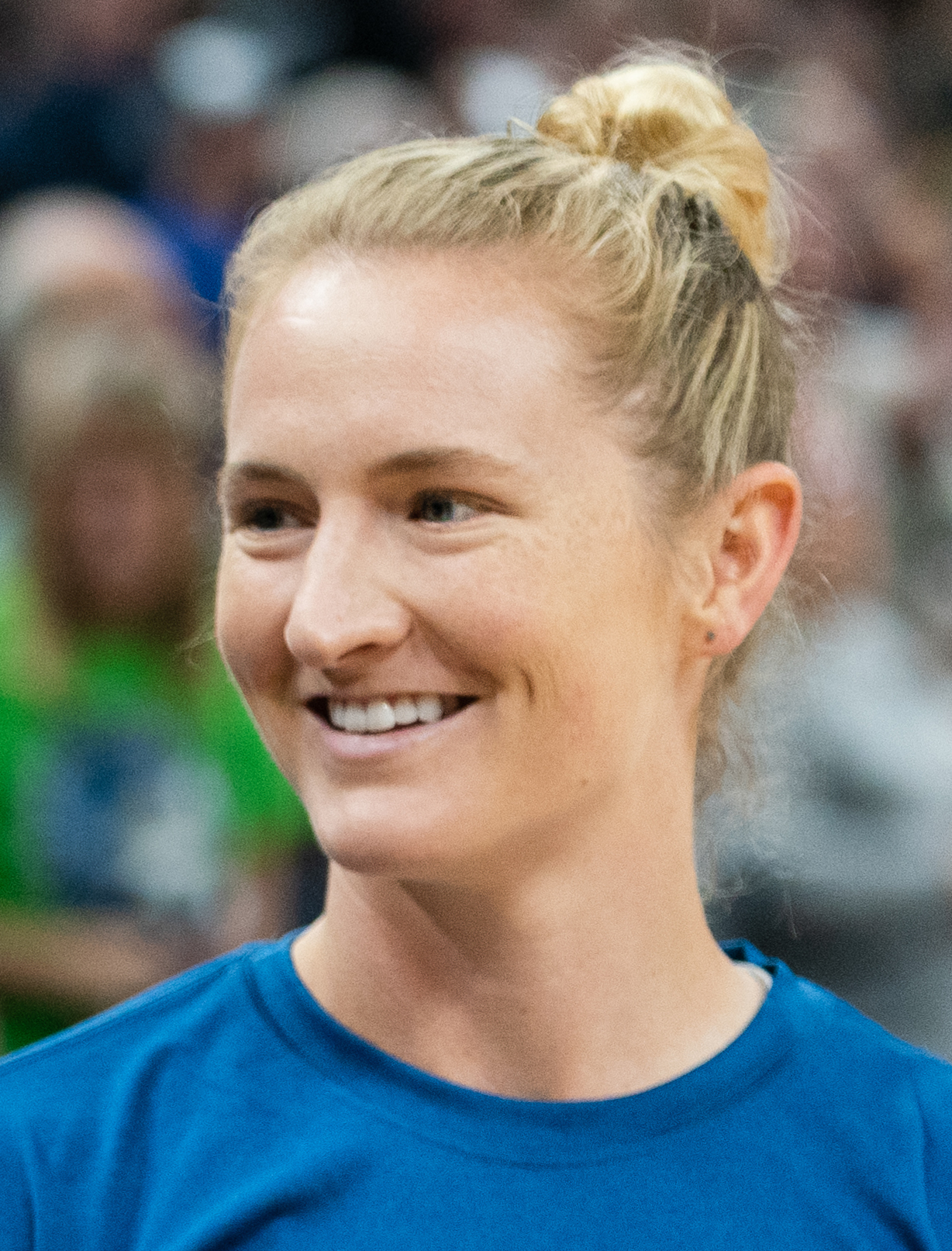
- Mewis in 2019

Personal information
- Full name: Samantha June Mewis
- Date of birth: October 9, 1992 (age 34)
- Place of birth: Weymouth, Massachusetts, United States
- Height: 1.83 m (6 ft 0 in)
- Position: Midfielder

Youth career
- 2005–2010: Scorpions SC
- 2007–2010: Whitman Hanson Regional
- 2014: Boston Breakers Academy

College career
Years	Team	Apps	(Gls)
2011–2014	UCLA Bruins	87	(31)

Senior career*
Years	Team	Apps	(Gls)
2013	Pali Blues	10	(1)
2015–2016	Western New York Flash	34	(9)
2017–2020	North Carolina Courage	53	(11)
2020–2021	Manchester City	17	(7)
2021	North Carolina Courage	5	(1)
2022–2023	Kansas City Current	0	(0)
Total		119	(29)

International career
2008	United States U-17	13	(8)
2010–2012	United States U-20	33	(8)
2013–2015	United States U-23	6	(2)
2014–2021	United States	83	(24)
Medal record
Representing United States
Olympic Games
Bronze medal – third place	2020 Tokyo
FIFA Women's World Cup
Winner	2019 France
CONCACAF Women's Championship
Winner	2018 United States
- * Club domestic league appearances and goals

Samantha June Mewis (born October 9, 1992) is an American former professional soccer player who played as a midfielder. Mewis is the editor-in-chief and podcast host of The Women's Game from Men in Blazers.

Raised in Hanson, Massachusetts, Mewis played college soccer for the UCLA Bruins, winning the 2013 national championship. She was picked fourth overall by the Western New York Flash in the 2015 NWSL College Draft and won her first NWSL Championship with the Flash in 2016. After their relocation to become the North Carolina Courage, she helped the club win three consecutive NWSL Shields and two NWSL Championships in 2018 and 2019. She then joined FA Women's Super League club Manchester City, winning the FA Cup in 2020. ESPN ranked her as the best player in the world after her season with Manchester City in 2021. She made a brief return to the Courage and the Kansas City Current before announcing her retirement due to long-term knee injury in 2024.

Mewis helped the United States win the 2012 FIFA U-20 Women's World Cup before making her senior debut during college in 2014. She made 83 appearances and scored 24 goals for the United States, winning the 2019 FIFA Women's World Cup and earning bronze at the 2020 Tokyo Olympics. She was named the U.S. Soccer Female Player of the Year in 2020.

== Early life ==
Born in Weymouth, Massachusetts, to Robert and Melissa Mewis, Samantha grew up in Hanson, Massachusetts, where she attended Whitman-Hanson Regional High School and played on the soccer team, tallying 77 goals and 34 assists during her time there. She grew up with her older sister Kristie, playing soccer for numerous youth teams, including club team, Scorpions SC, as well as the under-17 and under-20 United States national teams. Mewis earned Parade All-American honors twice during her high school years and was named the National Soccer Coaches Association of America national player of the year in 2010. In 2011, she was named Gatorade Massachusetts Girls Soccer Player of the Year for the second time after receiving the accolade previously for 2009–10. The same year, she was named ESPN RISE All-American after scoring 30 goals and serving 8 assists during her senior year.

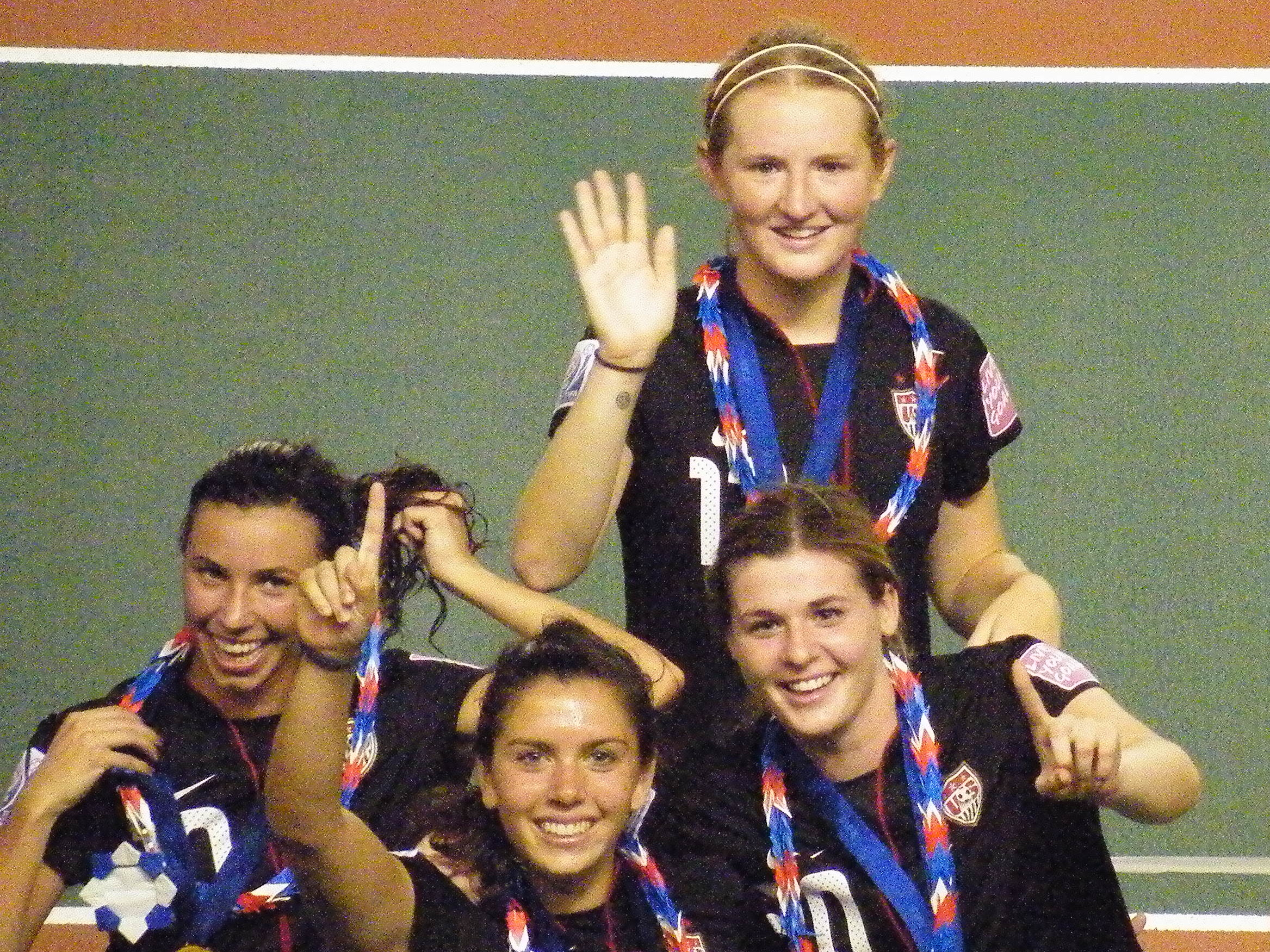
Mewis (top) celebrating the 2012 FIFA U20 Women's World Cup win with Vanessa DiBernardo, Mollie Pathman and Kelly Cobb

=== UCLA Bruins ===
In her first year, Mewis was second on the team in scoring with six goals and seven assists, only bested by current United States women's national soccer team member Sydney Leroux and was named to the Pac-12 All-Freshman Team. Due to national team commitments, Sam missed the first six games of her second season, but finished the year with three goals and three assists in 16 games. In her junior year, Mewis helped UCLA win the Pac-12 championship on the way to its first NCAA championship. In December 2014, she was named the winner of the 2015 Honda Award for soccer by the Collegiate Women Sports Awards (CWSA).

== Club career ==
=== Pali Blues ===
In 2013, Mewis signed with the Pali Blues in the W-League. The team won the western conference title as well as the national championship in July 2013.

=== Western New York Flash, 2015–2016 ===
Mewis was selected fourth overall by the Western New York Flash in the 2015 National Women's Soccer League entry draft. She started all 20 regular-season games for the Flash, scoring 4 goals and providing 4 assists to share the top of the team scoring leaderboard with Lynn Williams. On September 9, 2015, the NWSL announced that Mewis was selected as a finalist for NWSL Rookie of the Year for the 2015 season, along with Sofia Huerta and the eventual winner, Danielle Colaprico.

In the 2016 season, Mewis missed several games as she was away training with the U.S. WNT in preparations for the 2016 Summer Olympics. The Western New York Flash finished fourth in the standings and qualified for the play-offs. In the semi-final, Mewis scored a goal in the 16th minute helping the Western New York Flash to upset the Shield winning Portland Thorns. In the NWSL Championship game Mewis once again scored a goal. The Championship game went to penalties, Mewis missed her penalty but the Flash went on to win the Championship, winning the penalty shootout 3–2.

=== North Carolina Courage, 2017–2020 ===
It was announced on January 9, 2017, that the Western New York Flash was officially sold to new ownership, moved to North Carolina, and rebranded as the North Carolina Courage. Mewis had a very successful 2017 season, as she appeared in every game for the Courage, tallying 6 goals and 3 assists. She was named to the NWSL Best XI and was a finalist for the NWSL Most Valuable Player Award.

Mewis missed the beginning of the 2018 season as she was recovering from a knee injury. She appeared in 17 regular season games, as the Courage won their second consecutive NWSL Shield. In the play-offs, Mewis was in the starting line-up for the semi-final match against the Chicago Red Stars and scored a goal in the 86th minute. North Carolina won 2–0 and advanced to their second straight championship game. She played all 90 minutes in the NWSL Championship game as the Courage defeated the Portland Thorns 3–0. Mewis had now won three NWSL Championships.

Due to her participation in the 2019 World Cup, Mewis only appeared in 12 regular season games for the Courage in 2019. North Carolina won the NWSL Shield for the third consecutive season. They advanced to the final after defeating Reign FC in the semi-final. Mewis scored a goal in the championship game as North Carolina defeated the Chicago Red Stars 4–0 to win their second consecutive NWSL Championship.

With the 2020 season affected by the COVID-19 pandemic, Mewis took part in the 2020 NWSL Challenge Cup, making five appearances and scoring one goal as North Carolina topped the standings in the preliminary round but were eliminated in the first knockout round by #8 seed Portland Thorns FC.

=== Manchester City, 2020–2021 ===
On August 10, 2020, Mewis signed with Manchester City of the English FA WSL ahead of the 2020–21 season. She made her competitive debut for the club at Wembley Stadium on August 29 as a 68th-minute substitute during a 2–0 defeat to Chelsea in the 2020 Women's FA Community Shield. In total, Mewis made 32 appearances and scored 16 goals including the winner against Arsenal in the semi-final of the delayed 2019–20 Women's FA Cup and again in the final as Manchester City beat Everton 3–1 in extra-time to defend their title. City finished second in the league for the fourth consecutive season, this time losing out to Chelsea. Mewis was named to the FA WSL PFA Team of the Year at the end of the season.

=== North Carolina Courage, 2021 ===
On May 17, 2021, Mewis rejoined North Carolina Courage.

=== Kansas City Current, 2022–2023 ===
On November 30, 2021, Mewis was traded to Kansas City Current in exchange for Kiki Pickett and the No. 3 overall pick in the 2022 NWSL Draft. After undergoing arthroscopic surgery following the 2021 Olympics, Mewis played in two Challenge Cup games for the Current in March 2022, but did not play for the remainder of the season. She had a second knee surgery in January 2023 where cartilage donor grafts were placed in her knee, resulting in her missing the full 2023 NWSL season.

Following the 2023 season, Mewis announced her long-term knee injury would result in retirement from professional soccer.

== International career ==
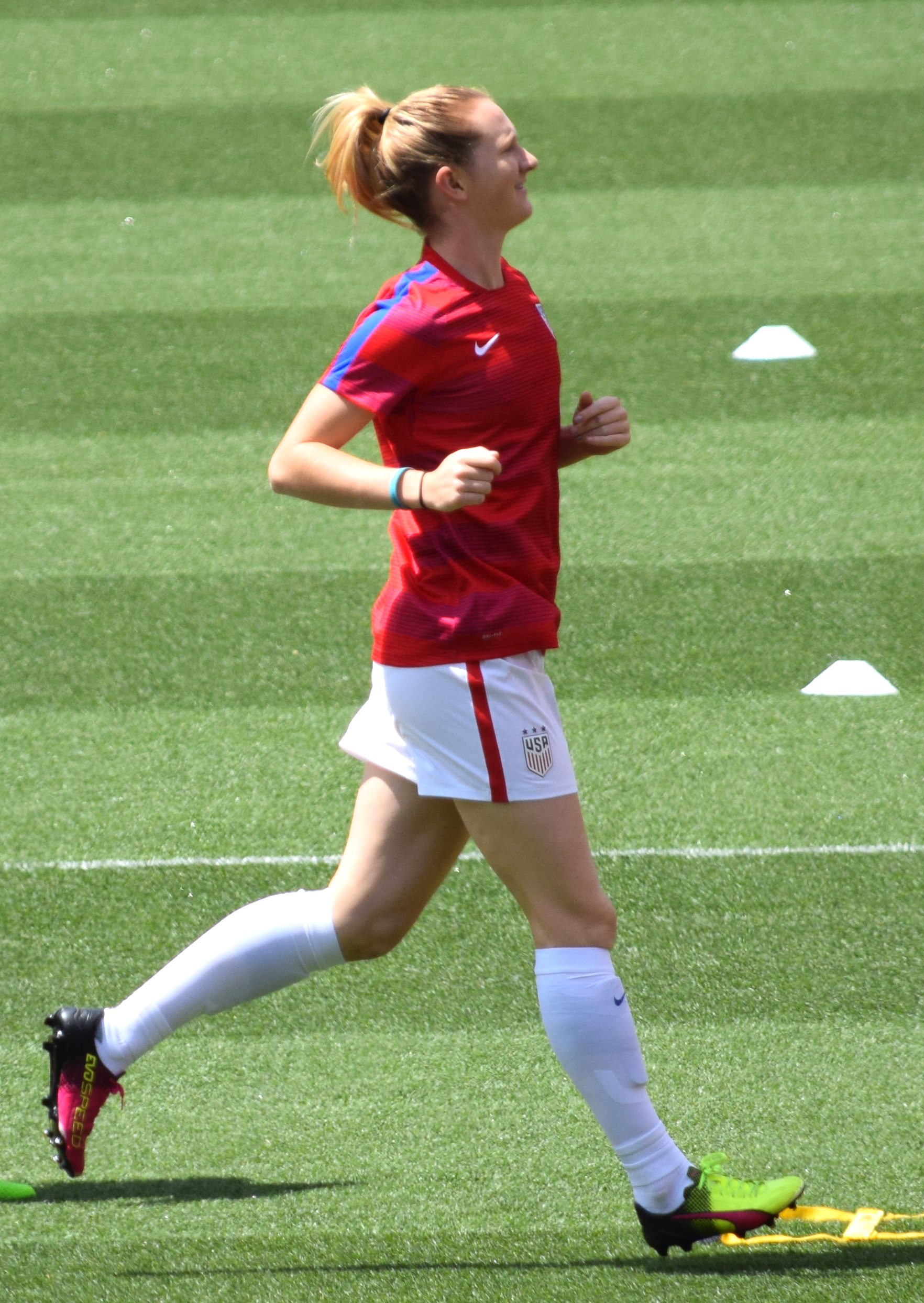
Mewis with the United States women's national soccer team in June 2016

Mewis was a member of the United States under-17 team that was runner-up at the 2008 FIFA U-17 Women's World Cup in New Zealand. As her sister Kristie was also a member of the team, they were the first sisters to represent the United States at a Women's World Cup. They also played together at the 2010 FIFA U-20 Women's World Cup. At the 2012 FIFA U-20 Women's World Cup, Mewis helped the team win the championship after defeating Germany 1–0 in the final.

On January 24, 2014, Mewis was named for the first time to the senior national team roster for friendlies against Canada and Russia. She made her debut for the team at the 2014 Algarve Cup during the team's second match of the tournament, a 1–0 loss to Sweden.

After a spell out of the team, Mewis was invited back to the senior team following their success at the 2015 FIFA Women's World Cup. She continued to get regular playing time, scoring four goals in 2016 including the winning goal against Germany in the 2016 She Believes Cup that won the United States the trophy. Mewis was named as an alternate to the U.S. women's national team for the 2016 Summer Olympics.

In 2017, Mewis was one of three players to appear in every game for the U.S. women's national team. She played 1,242 minutes, which placed her at second highest minutes on the team. She scored three goals and was a finalist for 2017 U.S. Female Player of the Year.

Mewis suffered a knee cartilage injury in a November 2017 game against Canada which sidelined her for six months, forcing her to miss the 2018 SheBelieves Cup. Mewis returned to the field for the U.S. in June 2018 in a friendly against China. In September 2018 she was named to the final 20 player roster of the 2018 CONCACAF Women's Championship.

In May 2019, Mewis was named to the final 23-player roster for the 2019 FIFA Women's World Cup. She played in 6 out of 7 matches, including the final, and scored two goals, both as part of a 13–0 group stage victory over Thailand. The United States won the 2019 World Cup after defeating the Netherlands 2–0.

In 2020, Mewis played in 8 of the 9 matches for the US, started 6 matches, and scored 4 goals. In December 2020, Mewis was named the 2020 U.S. Soccer Female Player of the Year for the first time. She is the 17th player to win the award.

On January 18, 2021, Mewis scored her first career hat-trick for either club or country in a 4–0 friendly win against Colombia. Her sister Kristie scored the only other goal. Mewis was a member of the US team at the 2020 Olympic Games in August 2021, scoring one goal in their quarterfinal win against the Netherlands. She and her team won the bronze medal in a 4–3 victory over Australia.

Mewis underwent knee cartilage surgeries in 2021 and 2023, resulting in an extended absence from the national team. On January 19, 2024, Mewis announced her retirement from professional soccer due to her long-term knee injury.

== Coaching ==
On June 7, 2024, it was announced that Mewis would lead Vermont Green's first-ever women's team in an exhibition game to be played on June 22. She will remain with Vermont as an advisor following the match. It was announced on February 13, 2025, that Mewis would return as head coach of Vermont Green FC's women's side for a second set of exhibition matches, on June 7 and 14 respectively. Mewis' side will face NY-based side Flower City 1872 in their first match, and will face Quebecoise club A.S. Blainville's women's team 7 days later.

== Media career ==
Mewis and Lynn Biyendolo hosted a podcast about women's soccer, Snacks, produced by Just Women's Sports, from April 2021 to November 2023. After announcing her retirement in January 2024, Mewis announced she would join the Men in Blazers Media Network as The Women's Game Editor-in-Chief. Her role would include hosting The Women's Game podcast, which consists of Friendlies, where she interviews soccer stars, and Good Vibes FC with Biyendolo and Becky Sauerbrunn. Mewis also occasionally hosts live post-match coverage for USWNT matches. These Do It Live! streams often feature special guests, such as New Zealand defender Ali Riley or Men in Blazers Editor-In-Chief Roger Bennett.

== Personal life ==
Mewis's older sister, Kristie, also played for the United States women's national soccer team and most recently played professionally for West Ham United. In late December 2018, Mewis married longtime boyfriend Pat Johnson in Boston, Massachusetts.

Following the United States' win at the 2019 FIFA Women's World Cup, Mewis and her teammates were honored with a ticker tape parade in New York City. Each player received a key to the city from Mayor Bill de Blasio. After winning the 2019 FIFA Women's World Cup, Mewis revealed that while she was young, her father, Bob Mewis, would pick up side jobs to be able to afford her and her sister's soccer expenses.

== Career statistics ==
=== Club ===
As of October 21, 2023

Appearances and goals by club, season and competition
Club	Season	League			National cup (Note: Includes NWSL Challenge Cup and FA Cup)		League cup (Note: Includes NWSL Playoffs and FA League Cup)		Continental (Note: Includes UEFA Champions League)		Other		Total	
Club	Season	Division	Apps	Goals	Apps	Goals	Apps	Goals	Apps	Goals	Apps	Goals	Apps	Goals
Western New York Flash	2015	NWSL	20	4	—		—		—		—		20	4
Western New York Flash	2016	NWSL	14	5	—		2	2	—		—		16	7
Western New York Flash	Total		34	9	0	0	2	2	0	0	0	0	36	11
North Carolina Courage	2017	NWSL	24	6	—		2	0	—		—		26	6
North Carolina Courage	2018	NWSL	17	3	—		2	1	—		—		19	4
North Carolina Courage	2019	NWSL	12	2	—		2	1	—		—		14	3
North Carolina Courage	2020	NWSL	—		5	1	—		—		—		5	1
North Carolina Courage	Total		53	11	5	1	6	2	0	0	0	0	64	14
Manchester City	2019–20	FA WSL	—		3	2	—		—		—		3	2
Manchester City	2020–21	FA WSL	17	7	2	2	3	0	6	5	1 (Note: 2020 Women's FA Community Shield)	0	29	14
Manchester City	Total		17	7	5	4	3	0	6	5	1	0	32	16
North Carolina Courage	2021	NWSL	5	1	0	0	0	0	—		—		5	1
Kansas City Current	2022	NWSL	0	0	0	0	2	0	—		—		2	0
Kansas City Current	2023	NWSL	0	0	0	0	—		—		—		0	0
Kansas City Current	Total		5	1	0	0	2	0	0	0	0	0	7	1
Career total			109	28	10	5	11	4	6	5	1	0	137	42

=== International ===
Scores and results list the United States' goal tally first, score column indicates score after each Mewis goal.

List of international goals scored by Sam Mewis
No.	Date	Venue	Opponent	Score	Result	Competition	Ref.
1	February 15, 2016	Toyota Stadium, Frisco, United States	Puerto Rico	10–0	10–0	2016 Olympic qualifying	
2	March 9, 2016	FAU Stadium, Boca Raton, United States	Germany	2–1	2–1	2016 SheBelieves Cup	
3	October 19, 2016	Rio Tinto Stadium, Sandy, United States	Switzerland	4–0	4–0	Friendly	
4	November 13, 2016	StubHub Center, Carson, United States	Romania	5–0	5–0	Friendly	
5	July 30, 2017	Qualcomm Stadium, San Diego, United States	Brazil	1–1	4–3	2017 Tournament of Nations	
6	October 22, 2017	WakeMed Soccer Park, Cary, United States	South Korea	1–0	6–0	Friendly	
7	October 22, 2017	WakeMed Soccer Park, Cary, United States	South Korea	2–0	6–0	Friendly	
8	October 7, 2018	WakeMed Soccer Park, Cary, United States	Panama	1–0	5–0	2018 CONCACAF Championship	
9	April 7, 2019	Banc of California Stadium, Los Angeles, United States	Belgium	4–0	6–0	Friendly	
10	May 12, 2019	Levi's Stadium, Santa Clara, United States	South Africa	1–0	3–0	Friendly	
11	May 12, 2019	Levi's Stadium, Santa Clara, United States	South Africa	2–0	3–0	Friendly	
12	May 16, 2019	Busch Stadium, St. Louis, United States	New Zealand	5–0	5–0	Friendly	
13	June 11, 2019	Stade Auguste-Delaune, Reims, France	Thailand	4–0	13–0	2019 FIFA World Cup	
14	June 11, 2019	Stade Auguste-Delaune, Reims, France	Thailand	6–0	13–0	2019 FIFA World Cup	
15	February 4, 2020	BBVA Stadium, Houston, United States	Costa Rica	4–0	6–0	2020 Olympic qualifying	
16	February 4, 2020	BBVA Stadium, Houston, United States	Costa Rica	6–0	6–0	2020 Olympic qualifying	
17	February 7, 2020	Dignity Health Sports Park, Carson, United States	Mexico	2–0	4–0	2020 Olympic qualifying	
18	February 7, 2020	Dignity Health Sports Park, Carson, United States	Mexico	3–0	4–0	2020 Olympic qualifying	
19	January 18, 2021	Exploria Stadium, Orlando, United States	Colombia	1–0	4–0	Friendly	
20	January 18, 2021	Exploria Stadium, Orlando, United States	Colombia	2–0	4–0	Friendly	
21	January 18, 2021	Exploria Stadium, Orlando, United States	Colombia	3–0	4–0	Friendly	
22	June 10, 2021	BBVA Stadium, Houston, United States	Portugal	1–0	1–0	Friendly	
23	July 1, 2021	Rentschler Field, East Hartford, United States	Mexico	2–0	4–0	Friendly	
24	July 30, 2021	Nissan Stadium, Yokohama, Japan	Netherlands	1–1	2–2 (a.e.t.) (4–2 p)	2020 Summer Olympics	

== Honors ==
UCLA

- NCAA Women's Soccer Championship: 2013

Western New York Flash

- NWSL Champions: 2016

North Carolina Courage

- NWSL Champions: 2018, 2019
- NWSL Shield: 2017, 2018, 2019

Manchester City

- Women's FA Cup: 2019–20

United States U20

- FIFA U20 Women's World Cup: 2012
- CONCACAF Women's U-20 Championship: 2012

United States

- FIFA Women's World Cup: 2019
- CONCACAF Women's Championship: 2018
- CONCACAF Women's Olympic Qualifying Tournament: 2016; 2020
- SheBelieves Cup: 2016; 2020
- Tournament of Nations: 2018
- Olympic Bronze Medal: 2020

Individual

- U.S. Soccer Female Player of the Year: 2020
- NWSL Best XI: 2017
- ESPN FC Women's Rank: #1 on the 2021 list of 50 best women's soccer players
- FA WSL PFA Team of the Year: 2020–21
- Honda Sports Award 2015

== See also ==
- List of UCLA Bruins
- 2012 CONCACAF Women's U-20 Championship squads
- 2010 FIFA U-20 Women's World Cup squads
