= 2025 SheBelieves Cup =

Tournament details
- Host country: United States
- Dates: February 20–26
- Teams: 4 (from 3 confederations)
- Venues: 3 (in 3 host cities)

Final positions
- Champions: Japan (1st title)
- Runners-up: United States
- Third place: Colombia
- Fourth place: Australia

Tournament statistics
- Matches played: 6
- Goals scored: 20 (3.33 per match)
- Attendance: 83,673 (13,946 per match)
- Top scorer(s): (Japan) Mina Tanaka (4 goals)
- Best player: (Japan) Mina Tanaka

The 2025 SheBelieves Cup, named the 2025 SheBelieves Cup Presented by Visa for sponsorship reasons, was the tenth edition of the SheBelieves Cup, an invitational women's soccer tournament held in the United States. Featuring national teams from Australia, Colombia, Japan, and the United States, the tournament was held from February 20 to 26, 2025. These were the debut SheBelieves Cup appearances for Australia and Colombia.

Japan won the tournament for the first time with victories in all three of their games. Mina Tanaka (JPN), who scored the most goals (4), earned the Most Valuable Player award.

== Format ==
The format returned to the traditional six-game, three-match-day format as it was in 2023. On each match day, two of the teams faced each other first, followed by the other two. The teams facing each other rotate from match day to match day in round-robin format.

For each game, 3 points were awarded for a win, 1 for a draw, and 0 for a loss. At the conclusion of the tournament the team with the most points won; if two teams were tied on points, the tie-breakers in order were goal difference, goals scored, head-to-head results, and a fair play ranking based on the number of red and yellow cards.

== Venues ==
Feb. 20: Houston, Texas	Feb. 23: Glendale, Arizona	Feb. 26: San Diego, Calif.
Shell Energy Stadium	State Farm Stadium	Snapdragon Stadium
Capacity: 20,656	Capacity: 63,400	Capacity: 35,000
2025 SheBelieves Cup is located in the United States

== Teams ==
Team	FIFA Ranking (December 2024)
United States	1
Japan	8
Australia	15
Colombia	21

== Standings ==
Pos	Team	Pld	W	D	L	GF	GA	GD	Pts
1st place, gold medalist(s)	Japan (C)	3	3	0	0	10	2	+8	9
2nd place, silver medalist(s)	United States (H)	3	2	0	1	5	3	+2	6
3rd place, bronze medalist(s)	Colombia	3	1	0	2	3	7	−4	3
4	Australia	3	0	0	3	2	8	−6	0

Source: Soccerway
Rules for classification: 1) points; 2) goal difference; 3) goals scored; 4) head-to-head result; 5) fair play ranking.
(C) Champions; (H) Hosts

== Results ==
February 20, 2025
16:00 UTC-6

Japan	4–0	Australia
Tanaka 6', 32'; Hamano 52'; Minami 75'	Report

Shell Energy Stadium, Houston, Texas
Attendance: 5,243
Referee: Natalie Simon (United States)
February 20, 2025
19:00 UTC-6

United States	2–0	Colombia
Macario 33'; Sentnor 60'	Report

Shell Energy Stadium, Houston, Texas
Attendance: 15,043
Referee: Karen Hernández (Mexico)

February 23, 2025
12:00 UTC-7

Colombia	1–4	Japan
Caicedo 45+4'	Report	Tanikawa 1'; Tanaka 8', 80' (pen.); Hamano 57'

State Farm Stadium, Glendale, Arizona
Attendance: 12,624
Referee: Alex Billeter (United States)
February 23, 2025
15:00 UTC-7

United States	2–1	Australia
Biyendolo 1'; Cooper 68'	Report	Heyman 80'

State Farm Stadium, Glendale, Arizona
Attendance: 23,503
Referee: Amairany García (Mexico)

February 26, 2025
16:30 UTC-8

Australia	1–2	Colombia
Raso 69'	Report	Bonilla 15'; Usme 73'

Snapdragon Stadium, San Diego, California
Attendance: 10,072
Referee: Ekaterina Koroleva (United States)
February 26, 2025
19:30 UTC-8

United States	1–2	Japan
Sentnor 14'	Report	Momiki 2'; Koga 50'

Snapdragon Stadium, San Diego, California
Attendance: 17,188
Referee: Carly Shaw-MacLaren (Canada)

== Goalscorers ==
There were 20 goals scored in 6 matches, for an average of 3.33 goals per match.

4 goals

- (Japan) Mina Tanaka

2 goals

- (Japan) Maika Hamano
- (United States) Ally Sentnor

1 goal

- (Australia) Michelle Heyman
- (Australia) Hayley Raso
- (Colombia) Wendy Bonilla
- (Colombia) Linda Caicedo
- (Colombia) Catalina Usme
- (Japan) Moeka Minami
- (Japan) Momoko Tanikawa
- (Japan) Yūka Momiki
- (Japan) Tōko Koga
- (United States) Lynn Biyendolo
- (United States) Michelle Cooper
- (United States) Catarina Macario

Source: Soccerway

At the conclusion of the tournament, the Most Valuable Player award was conferred on Mina Tanaka.

== See also ==
- 2025 Pinatar Cup
- 2025 Pink Ladies Cup
