= Mallory Swanson =

American soccer player (born 1998)

- Swanson with the Chicago Stars in 2026

Personal information
- Full name: Mallory Diane Swanson
- Birth name: Mallory Diane Pugh
- Date of birth: April 29, 1998 (age 28)
- Place of birth: Littleton, Colorado, U.S.
- Height: 5 ft 4 in (1.63 m)
- Position: Forward

Team information
- Current team: Chicago Stars
- Number: 9

Youth career
- 2011–2016: Real Colorado

College career
Years	Team	Apps	(Gls)
2017	UCLA Bruins	0	(0)

Senior career*
Years	Team	Apps	(Gls)
2017–2019	Washington Spirit	40	(10)
2020	Sky Blue FC	0	(0)
2021–	Chicago Stars	80	(25)

International career^{‡}
2013–2014	United States U17	12	(15)
2014–2016	United States U20	23	(17)
2016–	United States	105	(39)
Medal record
Women's soccer
Representing United States
CONCACAF Women's Championship
Winner	2018 United States
Winner	2022 Mexico
Olympic Games
Gold medal – first place	2024 Paris	Team
FIFA Women's World Cup
Gold medal – first place	2019 France
- * Club domestic league appearances and goals as of 05:39, November 2, 2026 (UTC) ‡ National team caps and goals as of October 13, 2026

Mallory Diane Swanson (née Pugh; born April 29, 1998) is an American professional soccer player who plays as a forward for the Chicago Stars of the National Women's Soccer League (NWSL) and the United States women's national team.

After playing extensively at the under-17 and under-20 level, Swanson debuted for the USWNT in 2016 at age 17, becoming the team's youngest player since Heather O'Reilly in 2002. Later that year she represented the United States at the 2016 Summer Olympics in Rio de Janeiro, where she became the youngest Olympic goalscorer for the United States. She won the 2019 FIFA Women's World Cup and gold at the 2024 Paris Olympics, scoring the only goal in the Olympic final.

Swanson elected to forego her college career at UCLA to turn professional in 2017, signing with the Washington Spirit, where she stayed for three seasons before playing at Sky Blue FC. She was then traded to the Chicago Red Stars, playing in the same city as her husband, Chicago Cubs baseball player Dansby Swanson.

== Early life ==
Born in Littleton, Colorado, to Karen and Horace Pugh, Swanson was raised with her older sister Brianna in Highlands Ranch, Colorado. Her mother was a long-distance runner and her father ran track and played football. Growing up, Swanson considered her older sister Brianna a role model and cites her as a reason she got started in soccer. She started playing soccer at the age of four and then followed in her sister's footsteps and played club soccer with Real Colorado in the Elite Clubs National League. She played on the competitive team with the club at the U-11 through U-18 levels; although she started playing recreational soccer at the U-5 level. During her last two years with the team, she often trained with the club's Boys Development Academy team. Swanson helped Real Colorado win state titles in 2010 and 2011. In addition, the team made it to the Elite Clubs National League finals in both 2013 and 2014. At the U-16 level, Real Colorado won state and regional titles and became runner-up at nationals. Swanson was named the MVP of the regional tournament that year.

As her parents, we know how she is. She's not hard on herself; she's just always looking to get better. We go to the games now and we're excited. Like, 'What is she going to do?' That's the fun part of it: What is she going to do?

— Horace Pugh, father

Swanson attended Mountain Vista High School in Highlands Ranch from 2012 to 2016. In her three seasons with the team, Swanson scored 47 goals and recorded 23 assists. As a freshman, Swanson was named to the All-Colorado Team after leading her team to a state title. She was named offensive MVP at Mountain Vista and a NSCAA Youth All-American for 2013. During her sophomore year, despite missing more than half of her high school games due to national team commitments, she helped the team to the state semifinals. As a junior, Swanson scored 24 goals and 12 assists in 18 games and helped the team reach the state semifinals. She was subsequently named the 2014–15 Gatorade National Girls Soccer Player of the Year and Colorado Sports Hall of Fame 2015 High School Female Athlete of the Year. In addition, she was named NSCAA Youth Girls National Player of the Year for 2014 and 2015.

In January 2016, it was reported that Swanson had turned down college in order to turn professional and play for National Women's Soccer League club Portland Thorns FC when she finished high school. Later that week, her father said the reports were false and that Swanson would join the Bruins of the University of California, Los Angeles for the 2016 season as originally planned. In July 2016, it was announced she delayed entrance to UCLA until January 2017, due to national team commitments for the Rio Olympics and the 2016 FIFA U–20 Women's World Cup. She appeared in three non-competitive spring scrimmages in early 2017 before departing UCLA prior to starting her freshman season to pursue a professional career.

== Club career ==
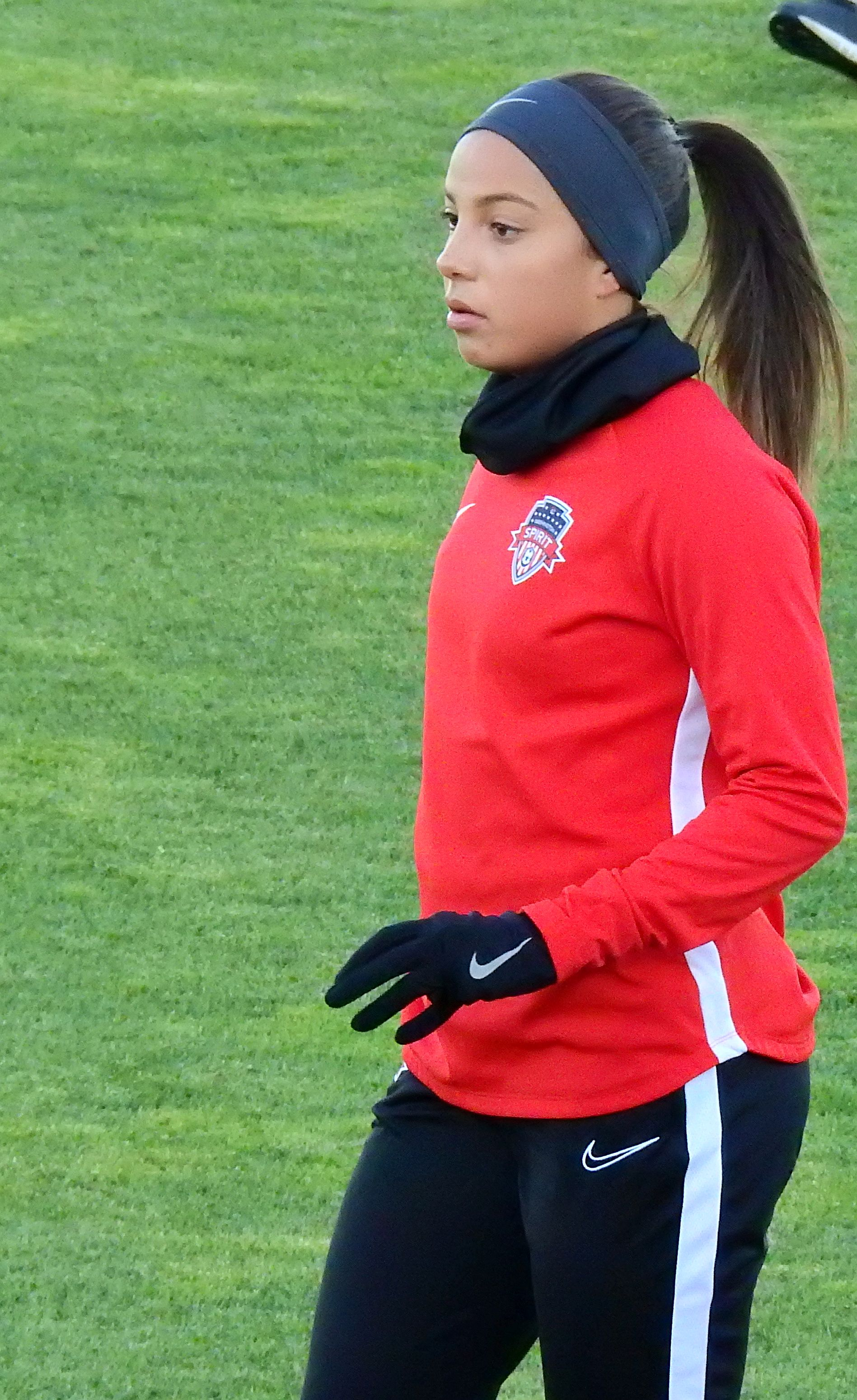
Swanson (then Pugh) with the Washington Spirit in 2019

=== Washington Spirit (2017–2019) ===
After much speculation as to where she would go when she turned pro, Swanson officially joined the Washington Spirit of the NWSL on May 13, 2017. She made her professional debut for the Spirit on May 20, 2017, versus FC Kansas City. Swanson scored her first professional goal on June 3, 2017, against the Houston Dash. Swanson’s first career assist came on August 26, 2017, in a game against the Chicago Red Stars. Swanson recorded her first professional brace later in the season on September 30, 2017, against Seattle Reign FC, where she also became the first teenager in NWSL history to score multiple goals in a single regular-season match. Swanson scored 6 goals in her rookie season and was named a finalist for NWSL Rookie of the Year.

Swanson remained with the Spirit for the 2018 season. She sustained a PCL sprain in her right knee on May 27, forcing her to miss 8 games. She returned to the pitch on August 5 against Seattle Reign FC.

=== Sky Blue FC (2020) ===
On January 16, 2020, at the 2020 NWSL College Draft, the Spirit traded Swanson to Sky Blue FC in exchange for four draft picks. She made her Sky Blue debut on September 5, 2020, in an NWSL Fall Series match against her former club, the Washington Spirit, entering the game in the 61st minute. Sky Blue won 2–1, with Swanson assisting Margaret Purce on the match-winning goal in stoppage time.

=== Chicago Stars (2021–present) ===
In December 2020, Sky Blue traded Swanson and Sarah Woldmoe to the Chicago Red Stars (later named Chicago Stars FC) in exchange for the fourth and eighth overall draft picks in the 2021 NWSL Draft, a conditional first round draft pick in the 2022 NWSL Draft, and an international roster spot for 2021–2022. Swanson made her debut in the 2021 NWSL Challenge Cup, starting the team's game against Kansas City. In 2021, Swanson was voted in second place for the most valuable player in the NWSL behind Jess Fishlock from OL Reign.

On February 18, 2023, Swanson's husband Dansby Swanson noted that the NWSL would have facilitated a trade for Mallory Swanson to another team if the Chicago Cubs had not signed him to a contract. After missing the majority of the 2023 NWSL season due to the knee injury she sustained while on international duty with the USWNT in April 2023, Swanson returned for the beginning of the 2024 NWSL season and started in the season opener against the Utah Royals on March 16, 2024. Swanson scored her first goal since her injury later in the month on March 29, 2024, an equalizer to secure a 1–1 draw against the Orlando Pride.

== International career ==
=== Youth national teams ===
In 2011, Swanson attended the annual United States under–14 girl's national team identification camp from July 13 to August 7 in Portland, Oregon. The camp was used as an evaluation for U–14 training camp held in September. Swanson was then called into the U–14 national team training camp at Home Depot Center in Carson, California, from September 18 to 25. In 2012, Swanson attended a U–15 national team training camp from February 11 to 18. She then joined the team for a second training camp from June 3 to 10 at The Home Depot Center. Also during the summer, the U–14 national team conducted three separate training camps to replace the large identification camp of previous years. Swanson attended the second camp, which ran from August 12 to 19.

==== U-17 WNT ====
In 2013, Swanson attended a U–15 national team training camp from February 24 to March 2 at the Olympic Training Center in Chula Vista, California. She then moved up to the U–17 national team and traveled to San José, Costa Rica for an international tournament in late April. Following the tournament, Swanson joined the U–17 team for a training camp from June 9 to 16. In preparation for the 2013 CONCACAF Women's U–17 Championship, Swanson attended another U–17 training camp from July 21 to 31 in Columbus, Ohio, as well as a camp in Lakewood Ranch, Florida, from September 15 to 22.

In late September 2013, Swanson was named to the roster for the 2013 CONCACAF U–17 Women's Championship held in Jamaica from October 30 to November 9. Before heading to Jamaica, the team trained together once again in Lakewood Ranch for seven days. During the tournament, Swanson was a key player and leading scorer with five goals and three assists. In the semifinal match against Mexico on November 7, the United States fell in penalties after a 1–1 tie in regulation. With a third-place finish in the tournament, the United States did not qualify to the 2014 FIFA U–17 Women's World Cup.

Swanson remained with the U–17 national team for a short time in 2014. She started off the year with the team at a training camp from January 11 to 19 in Carson, California. The camp served as a preparation for an international tournament held in February. Swanson was on the roster for the tournament, which was held at the U.S. National Team Training Center in Carson. In their final match of the tournament on February 9, the United States faced Japan. During the game, Swanson scored her fourth goal of the tournament to help the United States pull away the 2–1 victory and win the tournament title.

==== U-20 WNT ====
At the end of her time with the U–17 national team, Swanson was called up to the U–20 national team for a training camp from February 22 to March 2 that also featured a match against China. Swanson was then on a 25–player roster for a U–20 training camp from April 13 to 20. In preparation for the 2014 FIFA U–20 Women's World Cup in August, the U–20 team also trained in May and July, with a trip to Europe in June. After the team's final camp from July 9 to 23, Swanson was named to the roster for the 2014 FIFA U–20 Women's World Cup. At 16, she was the youngest member of the team. Swanson played all 90 minutes of the team's first match of the tournament against Germany on August 5. In the team's second group match against Brazil on August 8, Swanson suffered a right ankle injury in the 27th minute and was replaced by Taylor Racioppi. Despite the injury, Swanson went on to start the remaining two matches of the tournament. The United States team fell to Korea DPR on August 16, which halted their advancement in the tournament.

Swanson started off 2015 at a U–20 national team training camp in Sanford, Florida, from January 24 to 31. The training camp featured a match against German club Bayern Munich. Swanson started in that match; however, the U–20 team was defeated 4–0. Following the training camp, Swanson was named to the 22–player roster for an invitational tournament in La Manga, Spain. In the first match of the tournament, Swanson scored both goals of the game to help the United States defeat Norway. Swanson wore the captain's armband during the team's second match against the Netherlands on March 7. Swanson played all 90 minutes in the team's last match against Sweden on March 9.

In November 2015, Swanson was named to the roster for the 2015 CONCACAF Women's U–20 Championship in December. Swanson was the most experienced player on the roster and also captained the team. In the first match against Mexico on December 4, Swanson scored on a penalty kick in the 20th minute. The United States qualified for the 2016 FIFA U-20 Women's World Cup after defeating Honduras in the semifinal on December 11. Swanson helped the team win the tournament with a 1–0 win over Canada on December 13. Following the tournament, Swanson was awarded the Golden Boot for most goals scored and the Golden Ball for best player of the tournament. On December 18, Swanson was named the 2015 U.S. Soccer Young Female Player of the Year.

Despite being a member of the senior national team in 2016, Swanson at age 18 was still comfortably age eligible for the 2016 FIFA U-20 Women's World Cup. After returning from the Olympics, Swanson joined the U-20 team at a training camp on September 1, 2016. Swanson captained the U-20 United States team at the 2016 FIFA U-20 Women's World Cup where she was the most experienced player on their team with 23 international matches and 17 goals. In the second group stage game against New Zealand the United States won 3–1, Swanson scoring and receiving player of the match honors.

By participating in the 2016 FIFA U-20 Women's World Cup and the 2016 Summer Olympics, Swanson made history by being the first United States women's player to play in both tournaments in the same year. Swanson would still be age eligible for the 2018 FIFA U-20 Women's World Cup.

=== Senior national team ===
==== 2016 ====
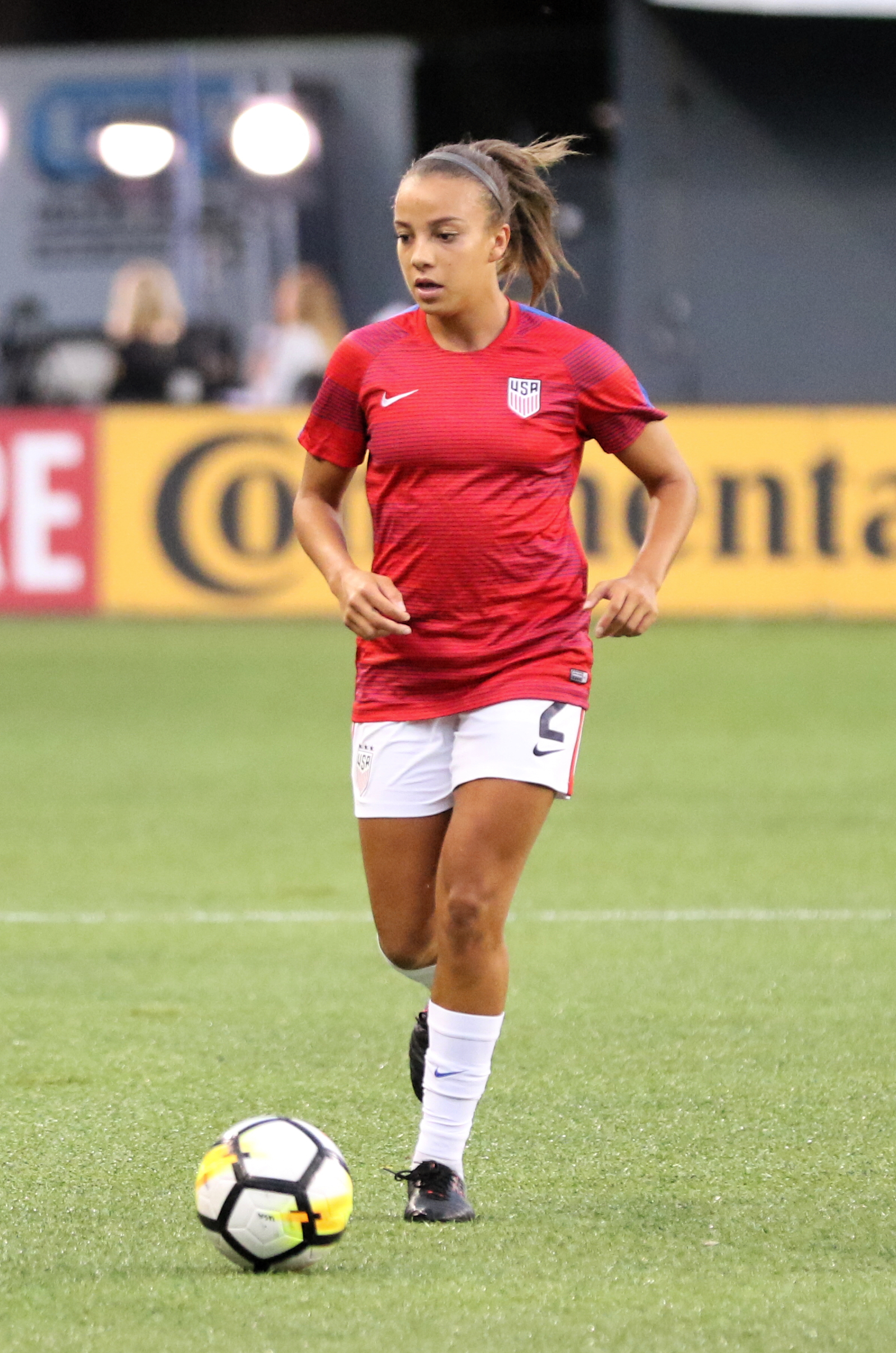
Swanson with the United States against New Zealand on September 19, 2017.

Following a successful run with the U-20 women's national team, Swanson was called up to the senior national team for the first training camp of 2016 from January 5 to 21 leading up to a match against Ireland. At age 17, she was one of the youngest field players to be called up to the team in 15 years. On January 23, 2016, Swanson earned her first cap for the USWNT during the match against Ireland, coming in for Alex Morgan in the 58th minute. She was the youngest player to debut for the national team since Heather O'Reilly's debut in 2002. She then became the 19th United States player to score in her debut when she scored her first international goal in the 83rd minute to secure the United States' 5–0 win.

Following her first appearance, Swanson was named to the 20–player roster for 2016 CONCACAF Women's Olympic Qualifying and became the youngest player to be named to an Olympic qualifying roster for the USWNT. In the team's opening match against Costa Rica on February 10, Swanson replaced Crystal Dunn in the 68th minute. She made her third appearance for the team in their second match of the tournament, coming in for Ali Krieger in the 75th minute to help the USWNT defeat Mexico 1–0. Swanson made her first start in the team's match against Puerto Rico on February 15. During the match, she recorded an assist in the 6th minute. In the 18th minute, Puerto Rico player Selimar Pagan took down Swanson in the penalty box and the USWNT was given a penalty kick, which Carli Lloyd scored. In the 60th minute, Swanson sent a cross towards Alex Morgan, but it was deflected off Puerto Rican defender Ashley Rivera and into her own net. Swanson started in the semifinal match against Trinidad and Tobago on February 19, helping the USWNT qualify to the 2016 Olympic Games in Rio de Janeiro after a 5–0 victory. Swanson also made the start in the final against Canada, helping the USWNT win the tournament after defeating Canada 2–0.

Swanson was named to the roster for the 2016 SheBelieves Cup that took place from March 3 to 9. She started in the team's opening match of the tournament on March 3 against England. In the match against France on March 6, Swanson assisted the only goal of the match in stoppage time, giving the USWNT the win. She also made an appearance in the final match of the tournament against Germany and the USWNT won the 2016 SheBelieves Cup with a 2–1 win.

Swanson joined a 23–player roster for a training camp ahead of two matches against Colombia in early April. On April 6, Swanson scored her second international goal off an assist by Carli Lloyd in the team's first match against Colombia. She then assisted Lloyd's goal six minutes later. She played all 90 minutes in the second match against Colombia on April 10. When Swanson turned 18 on April 29, 2016, she had added her name to a list of records, including fifth all-time for most USWNT caps before the age of 18 with 11, third for most goals before the age of 18 with two, fourth in most starts before the age of 18 with seven, and first for most assists before the age of 18 with five.

Swanson was on the roster for a short training camp ahead of another two–game series against Japan in early June. She played all 90 minutes of the first match on June 2 in Commerce City, Colorado, and made an assist in the 27th minute. Swanson did not dress for the second match on June 5 due to illness.

==== 2016 Summer Olympics ====
On July 12, 2016, Swanson was named to the 18–player team that would represent the United States at the 2016 Olympic Games in Rio de Janeiro. She made her Olympic debut on August 3 in the team's opening group match against New Zealand. On August 9, Swanson came in for Megan Rapinoe in the 33rd minute of the team's final group match against Colombia. She scored in the 59th minute, becoming the youngest United States player to score a goal in the Olympics. She put the United States ahead 2–1 with her goal; however, the match ended in a 2–2 draw. In the quarterfinals, Swanson started in the match against Sweden on August 12. The game was tied 1–1 after regulation time and Swanson was replaced by Lindsey Horan in the 114th minute in extra time. The United States were then defeated by Sweden in penalty kicks.

==== 2017 ====
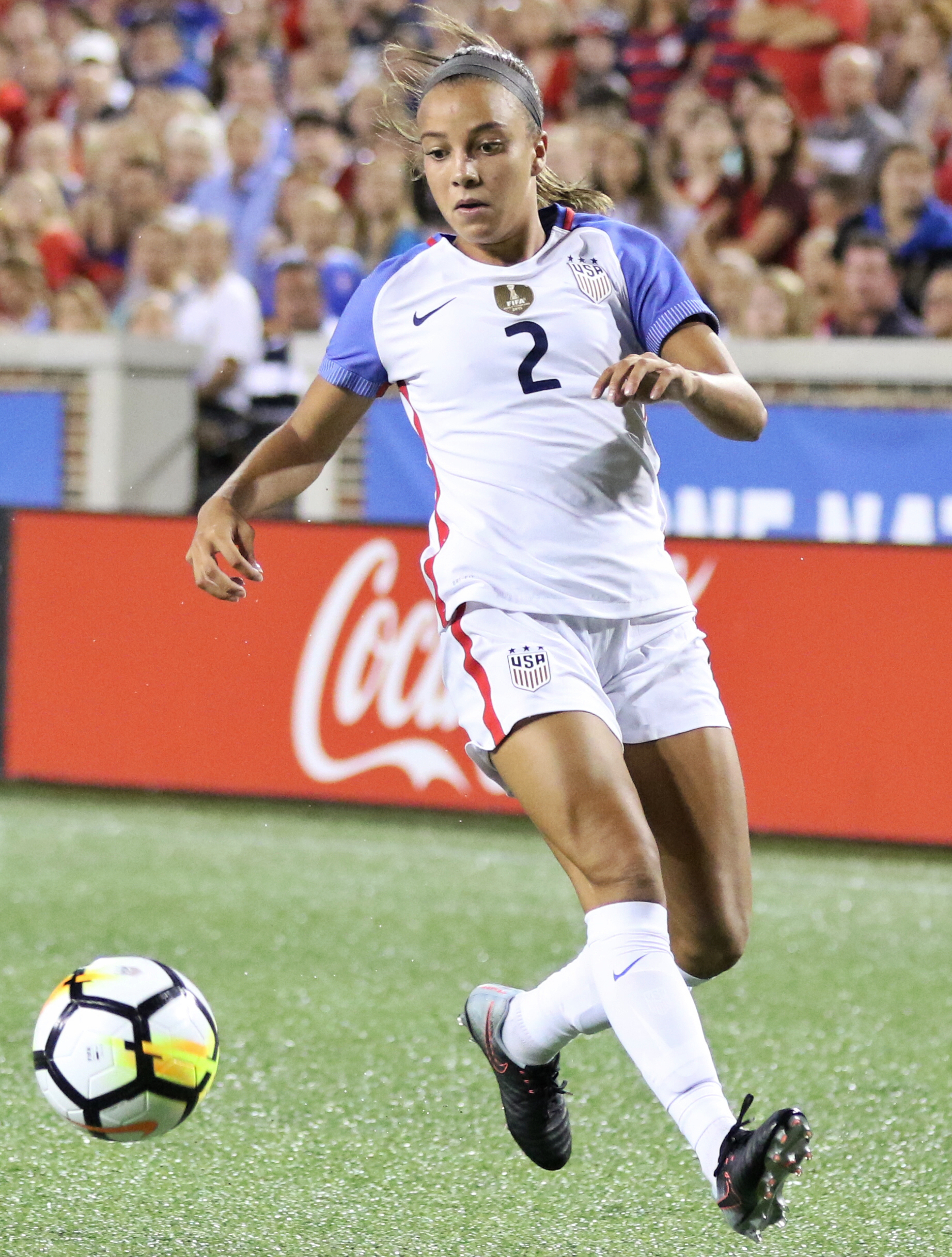
Swanson with the USWNT in 2017

Across the 16 games played by the USWNT in 2017, Swanson played in 12 and started in 9 of them. She was named to the roster for the 2017 SheBelieves Cup. After turning 19 on April 29, 2017, Swanson's records for the USWNT were tied with Mia Hamm for third in USWNT history for goals before age of 19 with four, fourth in caps with 22, and second in starts with 15. In October Swanson sustained a hamstring injury during a match against the South Korean national team when the USWNT was winning 3–1.

==== 2018 ====
Swanson started 2018 off strong with her first career brace on January 21, 2018, against Denmark, the USWNT winning the game 5–1. In her last game as a teenager on April 8, 2018, against Mexico she scored her fifth goal of the calendar year. For her teenage national team stats, Swanson was second all-time in starts before the age of 20 with 27, second all-time in caps before the age of 20 with 35, tied third all-time in goals before the age of 20 with 11, and first all-time in assists before the age of 20 with 12.

On June 8, 2018, Swanson injured her PCL in her right knee. She made her comeback on August 31, 2018, in a game against Chile. The United States won 3–0, Swanson assisting the third goal scored by Christen Press who was being honored that game for 100 national team caps.

==== 2019 ====
Swanson scored the first goal of the year for the United States in a 3–1 loss against France played at Le Havre. She played in the 2019 SheBelieves Cup where the United States finished as runners up. On April 4, Swanson scored her second career brace in a match against Australia, the United States winning 5–3. Her first goal in that game came just 37 seconds after she had subbed onto the pitch in the 67th minute. Swanson also scored against Mexico in the final send off series game for the United States before the 2019 FIFA Women's World Cup.

==== 2019 FIFA Women's World Cup ====
Swanson was one of 23 players called up for the 2019 FIFA Women's World Cup. At 21 she was the second youngest player on the roster behind 20 year old Tierna Davidson. The USWNT played their first game on June 11, 2019, against Thailand, winning by a historic 13–0 margin. Swanson subbed on in the 69th minute, assisting Megan Rapinoe's goal in the 74th minute and later scoring her first FIFA Women's World Cup goal in the 85th minute. She was 21 years and 43 days old when she scored, making her the third youngest USWNT player in history to score at the FIFA Women's World Cup. She appeared in all three group stage games against Thailand, Chile and Sweden. The USWNT went on to win the 2019 FIFA Women's World Cup.

==== 2020 ====
Swanson was named to the roster for the 2020 SheBelieves Cup, marking her fifth appearance at the tournament. In their third and final game of the tournament against Japan, the United States won 3–1, Swanson assisting a goal scored by Lindsey Horan. After the USWNT had a break in international playing due to COVID-19, Swanson was unavailable to participate in the national team camp being held from October 18–28, 2020 due to injury.

==== 2021 ====
Swanson began the year attending the annual January camp for the United States. However, injury and inconsistent play meant she did not see the field for the United States until later that year, in a series of friendlies in September and October versus Paraguay and the South Korean national team. Swanson's return to play was strong, notching three assists in the first game against Paraguay, the most for any United States player in one game since Alex Morgan in the 2019 FIFA Women's World Cup.

==== 2022 ====
Swanson saw a return to normalcy in 2022, playing in 15 of the United States' 18 games and starting 13 of them. She was named to the roster for the United States in the 2022 SheBelieves Cup and finished as the leading goal scorer of the tournament, hitting the back of the net once versus New Zealand and twice versus Iceland. As the year went on, Swanson continued to break records, both those of the United States' and her own. Her goal against Uzbekistan on April 12 marked a four-match scoring streak, overtaking the record from 2021 previously held by Megan Rapinoe. During the 2022 CONCACAF W Championship, Swanson played in her 75th national team cap for the United States, the 49th player to do so and the youngest since Heather O'Reilly in 2008. She had 14 goal involvements, 7 goals and a team-high 7 assists – her career best.

==== 2023 ====
Swanson continued her strong form in early 2023, scoring three times in a pair of friendly games against New Zealand and another three times at the 2023 SheBelieves Cup. This meant she scored in five consecutive USWNT games, a personal best.

On April 9, 2023, the United States Soccer Federation confirmed that during a USWNT friendly against Ireland on April 8, Swanson tore her left patella tendon.

==== 2024 ====
Following her recovery, Swanson returned to the USWNT for the 2024 SheBelieves Cup in April 2024. On June 1, scored a brace against South Korea in a friendly match in her home state of Colorado.

On June 26, 2024, Swanson was selected to the 18-player roster for the 2024 Summer Olympics in France, marking her second Olympic tournament. In the group stage, she scored a brace in the 3–0 win against Zambia and added another goal against Germany. In what was her 100th international appearance, she scored the 57th-minute winning goal to defeat Brazil 1–0 in the Olympic final, earning a gold medal.

== Personal life ==
Swanson is a Christian. In late 2017, she started dating Major League Baseball shortstop Dansby Swanson after meeting him through her brother-in-law and Swanson's former teammate Jace Peterson. The couple married on December 10, 2022. She began using her married name in 2023. On May 7, 2025 the couple announced on Instagram that they were expecting their first child. In November 2025, Swanson gave birth to a baby girl.

== Career statistics ==
=== Club ===
As of match played October 23, 2026

Appearances and goals by club, season and competition
Club	Season	League			National cup		Playoffs		Other		Total	
Club	Season	Division	Apps	Goals	Apps	Goals	Apps	Goals	Apps	Goals	Apps	Goals
Washington Spirit	2017	NWSL	16	6	—		—		—		16	6
Washington Spirit	2018	NWSL	15	2	—		—		—		15	2
Washington Spirit	2019	NWSL	9	2	—		—		—		9	2
Washington Spirit	Total		40	10	—		—		—		40	10
Sky Blue FC	2020	NWSL	—		—		—		1 (Note: Appearance in NWSL Fall Series)	0	1	0
Chicago Stars	2021	NWSL	23	4	—		2	1	2 (Note: Appearances in NWSL Challenge Cup)	1	27	6
Chicago Stars	2022	NWSL	16	11	—		1	0	5	4	22	15
Chicago Stars	2023	NWSL	2	1	—		—		0	0	2	1
Chicago Stars	2024	NWSL	24	7	—		1	0	—		25	7
Chicago Stars	2025	NWSL	Did not play									
Chicago Stars	2026	NWSL	14	2	—		—		—		14	2
Chicago Stars	Total		79	25	—		4	1	7	5	90	31
Career total			119	35	0	0	4	1	8	5	131	41

=== International ===
As of match played October 13, 2026

Appearances and goals by national team and year
National team	Year	Apps	Goals
United States	2016	17	4
United States	2017	12	2
United States	2018	14	6
United States	2019	19	6
United States	2020	1	0
United States	2021	4	0
United States	2022	15	7
United States	2023	6	7
United States	2024	15	6
United States	2025	0	0
United States	2026	2	1
Total		105	39

Scores and results list United States's goal tally first, score column indicates score after each Swanson goal.

List of international goals scored by Mallory Swanson
No.	Date	Venue	Opponent	Score	Result	Competition	Ref.
1	January 23, 2016	San Diego, California, United States	Republic of Ireland	5–0	5–0	Friendly	
2	April 6, 2016	East Hartford, Connecticut, United States	Colombia	3–0	7–0	Friendly	
3	July 22, 2016	Kansas City, Kansas, United States	Costa Rica	2–0	4–0	Friendly	
4	August 9, 2016	Manaus, Brazil	Colombia	2–1	2–2	2016 Summer Olympics	
5	August 3, 2017	Carson, California, United States	Japan	2–0	3–0	2017 Tournament of Nations	
6	September 19, 2017	Cincinnati, Ohio, United States	New Zealand	2–0	5–0	Friendly	
7	January 21, 2018	San Diego, California, United States	Denmark	3–1	5–1	Friendly	
8	January 21, 2018	San Diego, California, United States	Denmark	4–1	5–1	Friendly	
9	March 4, 2018	Harrison, New Jersey, United States	France	1–0	1–1	2018 SheBelieves Cup	
10	April 5, 2018	Jacksonville, Florida, United States	Mexico	1–0	4–1	Friendly	
11	April 8, 2018	Houston, Texas, United States	Mexico	1–0	6–2	Friendly	
12	September 4, 2018	San Jose, California, United States	Chile	1–0	4–0	Friendly	
13	January 19, 2019	Le Havre, France	France	1–3	1–3	Friendly	
14	April 4, 2019	Commerce City, Colorado, United States	Australia	4–2	5–3	Friendly	
15	April 4, 2019	Commerce City, Colorado, United States	Australia	5–3	5–3	Friendly	
16	May 26, 2019	Harrison, New Jersey, United States	Mexico	2–0	3–0	Friendly	
17	June 11, 2019	Reims, France	Thailand	11–0	13–0	2019 FIFA Women's World Cup	
18	October 3, 2019	Charlotte, North Carolina, United States	South Korea	2–0	2–0	Friendly	
19	February 20, 2022	Carson, California, United States	New Zealand	5–0	5–0	2022 SheBelieves Cup	
20	February 23, 2022	Frisco, Texas, United States	Iceland	3–0	5–0	Friendly	
21	February 23, 2022	Frisco, Texas, United States	Iceland	4–0	5–0	Friendly	
22	April 9, 2022	Columbus, Ohio, United States	Uzbekistan	2–0	9–1	Friendly	
23	April 12, 2022	Chester, Pennsylvania, United States	Uzbekistan	3–0	9–0	Friendly	
24	July 14, 2022	San Nicolás de los Garza, Mexico	Costa Rica	2–0	3–0	2022 CONCACAF W Championship	
25	November 13, 2022	Harrison, New Jersey, United States	Germany	2–1	2–1	Friendly	
26	January 18, 2023	Wellington, New Zealand	New Zealand	1–0	4–0	Friendly	
27	January 18, 2023	Wellington, New Zealand	New Zealand	3–0	4–0	Friendly	
28	January 21, 2023	Auckland, New Zealand	New Zealand	3–0	5–0	Friendly	
29	February 16, 2023	Orlando, Florida, United States	Canada	1–0	2–0	2023 SheBelieves Cup	
30	February 16, 2023	Orlando, Florida, United States	Canada	2–0	2–0	2023 SheBelieves Cup	
31	February 19, 2023	Nashville, Tennessee, United States	Japan	1–0	1–0	Friendly	
32	February 22, 2023	Frisco, Texas, United States	Brazil	2–0	2–1	Friendly	
33	June 1, 2024	Commerce City, Colorado, United States	South Korea	1–0	4–0	Friendly	
34	June 1, 2024	Commerce City, Colorado, United States	South Korea	4–0	4–0	Friendly	
35	July 25, 2024	Nice, France	Zambia	2–0	3–0	2024 Summer Olympics	
36	July 25, 2024	Nice, France	Zambia	3–0	3–0	2024 Summer Olympics	
37	July 28, 2024	Marseille, France	Germany	2–1	4–1	2024 Summer Olympics	
38	August 10, 2024	Paris, France	Brazil	1–0	1–0	2024 Summer Olympics	
39	October 13, 2026	Chester, Pennsylvania, United States	Spain	2–2	2–2	Friendly	

== Honors ==
United States

- FIFA Women's World Cup: 2019
- Summer Olympic Games Gold Medal: 2024
- CONCACAF Women's Championship: 2018; 2022
- SheBelieves Cup: 2016; 2018; 2020; 2022; 2023, 2024

Individual

- U.S. Soccer Young Female Athlete of the Year: 2015
- Gatorade National Female Soccer Player of the Year: 2016
- National Soccer Coaches Association of America (NSCAA) Youth Girls National Player of the Year: 2014
- NSCAA Youth All–America Team: 2013
- Sports Illustrated Sports Kid of the Year Top 5 Finalist: 2012
- NWSL Best XI: 2022
- SheBelieves Cup Top scorer: 2023
- ESPN FC Women's Rank: #15 on the 2024 list of 50 best women's soccer players 2024
