= Catarina Macario =

American soccer player (born 1999)

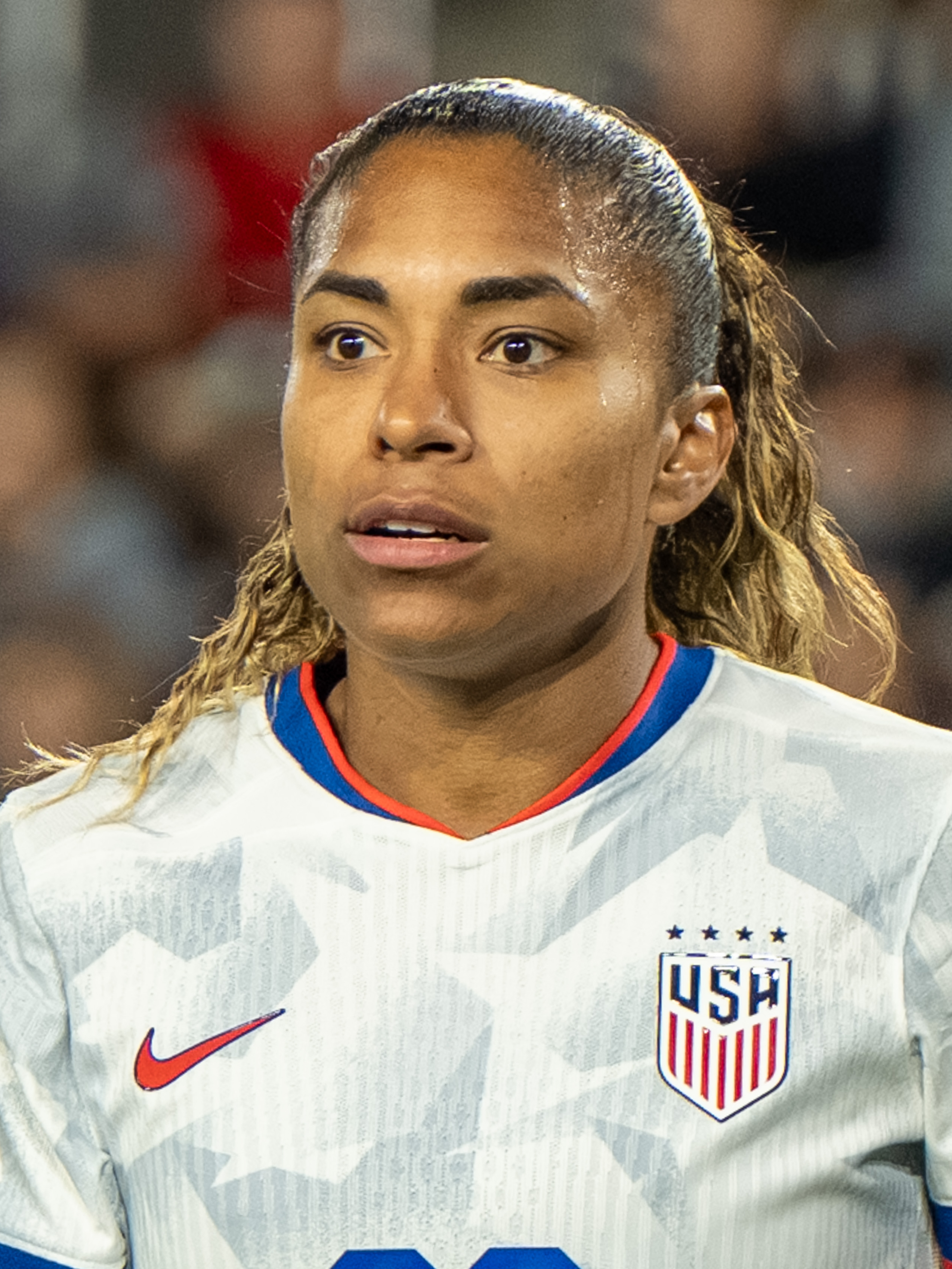
- Macario with the United States in 2025

Personal information
- Full name: Catarina Cantanhede Melônio Macário
- Date of birth: October 4, 1999 (age 27)
- Place of birth: São Luís, Maranhão, Brazil
- Height: 5 ft 5 in (1.65 m)
- Positions: Midfielder; forward

Team information
- Current team: San Diego Wave
- Number: 20

Youth career
- Flamengo
- –2007: Cruzeiro
- 2007–2011: Santos
- 2012–2017: San Diego Surf
- 2014: Torrey Pines Falcons

College career
Years	Team	Apps	(Gls)
2017–2020	Stanford Cardinal	69	(63)

Senior career*
Years	Team	Apps	(Gls)
2021–2023	Lyon	27	(19)
2023–2026	Chelsea	35	(7)
2026–	San Diego Wave	0	(0)

International career^{‡}
2012	United States U14		
2013	United States U15		
2018–2019	United States U23	5	(5)
2021–	United States	29	(16)
Medal record
Olympic Games
Bronze medal – third place	Tokyo 2020	Team
- * Club domestic league appearances and goals as of March 27, 2026 ‡ National team caps and goals as of December 1, 2025

Catarina Cantanhede Melônio Macário (Brazilian Portuguese: [kataˈɾinɐ kɐ̃tɐˈɲedʒi meˈlonju maˈkaɾju]; born October 4, 1999) is a professional soccer player who plays as a midfielder or forward for San Diego Wave FC of the National Women's Soccer League (NWSL). Born in Brazil, she plays for the United States national team.

Macario played college soccer for the Stanford Cardinal, where she won the 2017 and 2019 national championships and was twice awarded the Hermann Trophy, given to college soccer's best player. In 2021, Macario signed with Lyon and won the UEFA Women's Champions League in her first full season. She joined Women's Super League club Chelsea in 2023.

Macario made her senior debut for the United States in 2021. She won a bronze medal with the team at the Tokyo Olympics later that year.

== Early life ==
Macario was born in São Luís, Maranhão, Brazil, to Ana Maria Cantanhede and José Melônio Macário. She started playing football at the age of 4, following the footsteps of her older brother, Estevão (known in the U.S. as Steve). She started playing in the academy of Flamengo in São Luís. She remained there for less than 6 months before switching to the Cruzeiro academy. At the age of 7, she moved with the family to Brasília, the capital of Brazil. In Brasília, Catarina played for the Santos academy, where she remained until she moved to the United States in December 2011. In Brazil, Catarina had always played for boys' teams and only started playing for a girls' team after arriving in the United States. In 2011, at the age of 12 and without speaking any English, Macario relocated with her father and brother to San Diego, California, in order to pursue her dream of playing soccer. Her mother, a doctor, remained in Brazil in order to financially support the family. While playing for the San Diego Surf as a youth player, she broke the all-time goal scoring record in the ECNL with 165 goals.

== College career ==
On February 1, 2017, Macario committed to play collegiately for Stanford University. In her freshman year in 2017, she played 25 matches, scoring 17 goals and clinching 16 assists. As a result of her performance this year she won several awards, including being named "ESPNW Player of the Year", "TopDrawerSoccer.com Freshman of the Year", "Pac-12 Forward of the Year", and "Pac-12 Freshman of the Year".

In her sophomore year in 2018, Macario scored 14 goals with 8 assists in 19 matches played. On December 11, 2018, she received the TopDrawerSoccer.com National Player of the Year Award. On January 4, 2019, Macario won the MAC Hermann Trophy, awarded to the nation's top female and male players. Additionally, she was named "espnW Player of the Year" and "Pac-12 Forward of the Year" for the second year in a row.

In her junior year, Macario was the winner of the Honda Sports Award, given to the nation's top female collegiate soccer player. She was also awarded the MAC Hermann Trophy a second time, becoming the sixth woman to repeat as winner since the award was established in 1988.

Stanford won the NCAA Women's College Cup in her freshman and junior years.

On January 8, 2021, Macario announced that she would be forgoing her senior season at Stanford to start her professional career.

== Club career ==
=== Lyon (2021–2023) ===
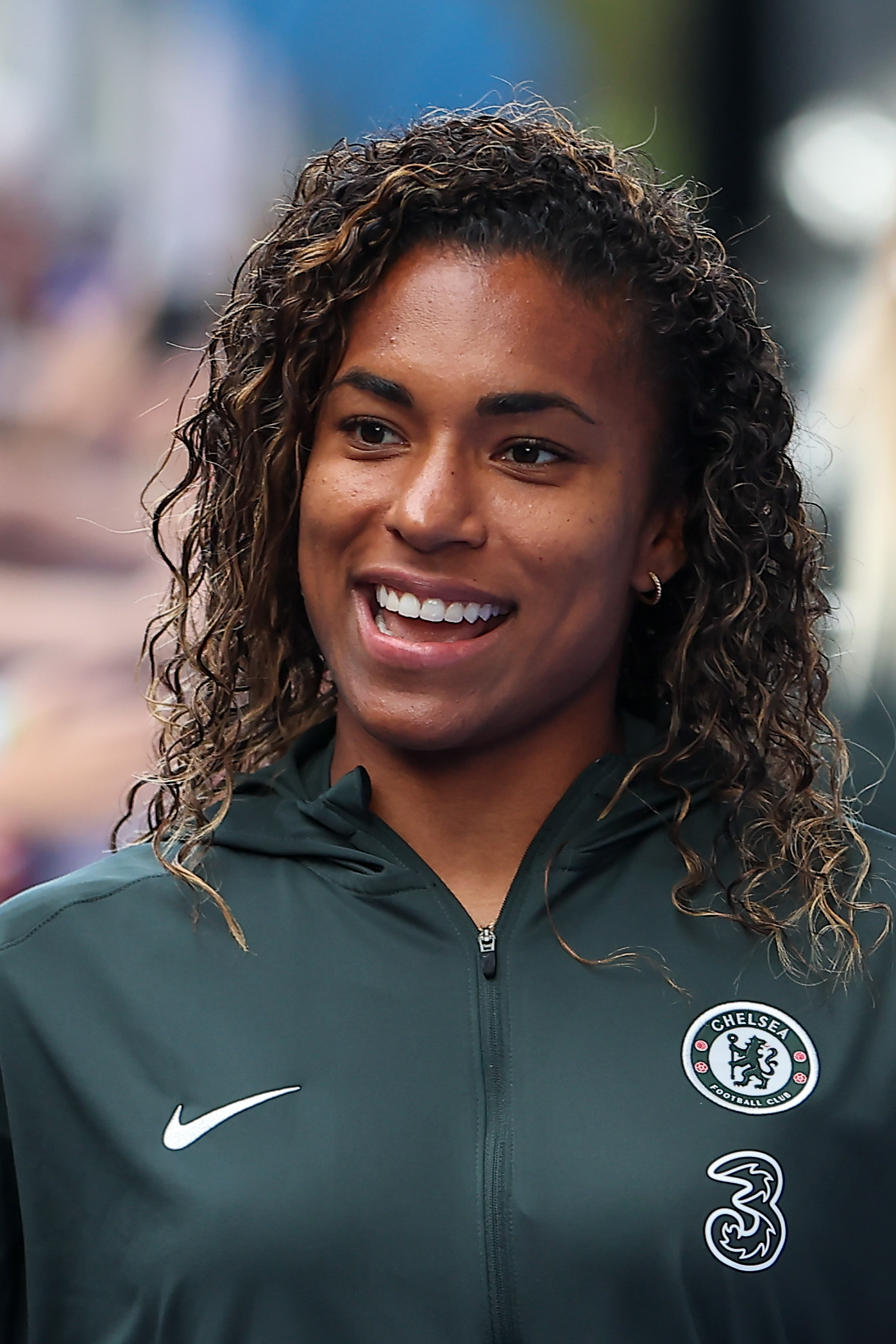
Macario with Chelsea in 2025.

On January 12, 2021, Lyon announced they signed Macario for 2.5 years. She made her debut for Lyon in the Division 1 Féminine on February 6, 2021, coming on as a substitute in the 37th minute for Amandine Henry in a 2–1 win against Montpellier. On May 21, 2022, Macario scored in the UEFA Women's Champions League final to help secure a 3–1 victory against FC Barcelona. Macario along with Lyon teammate Lindsey Horan became the fourth and fifth Americans to win the UEFA Women's Champion League.

=== Chelsea (2023–2026) ===
On June 9, 2023, Chelsea announced they had signed Macario on a free transfer from Lyon on a three-year deal. Macario scored her first goal 6 minutes into her debut for Chelsea on March 3, 2024, during a WSL game against Leicester City after returning from an ACL injury she got in June 2022. In her second game for Chelsea, she scored for a 1–0 victory over Everton in the FA Cup three minutes after being subbed in.

=== San Diego Wave (2026–) ===
In March 2026, Macario signed with NWSL club San Diego Wave FC for a transfer fee of approximately $300,000 paid to Chelsea F.C., and signing a five-year contract through 2030 with her hometown team that will pay her approximately $1.6 million a season.

== International career ==
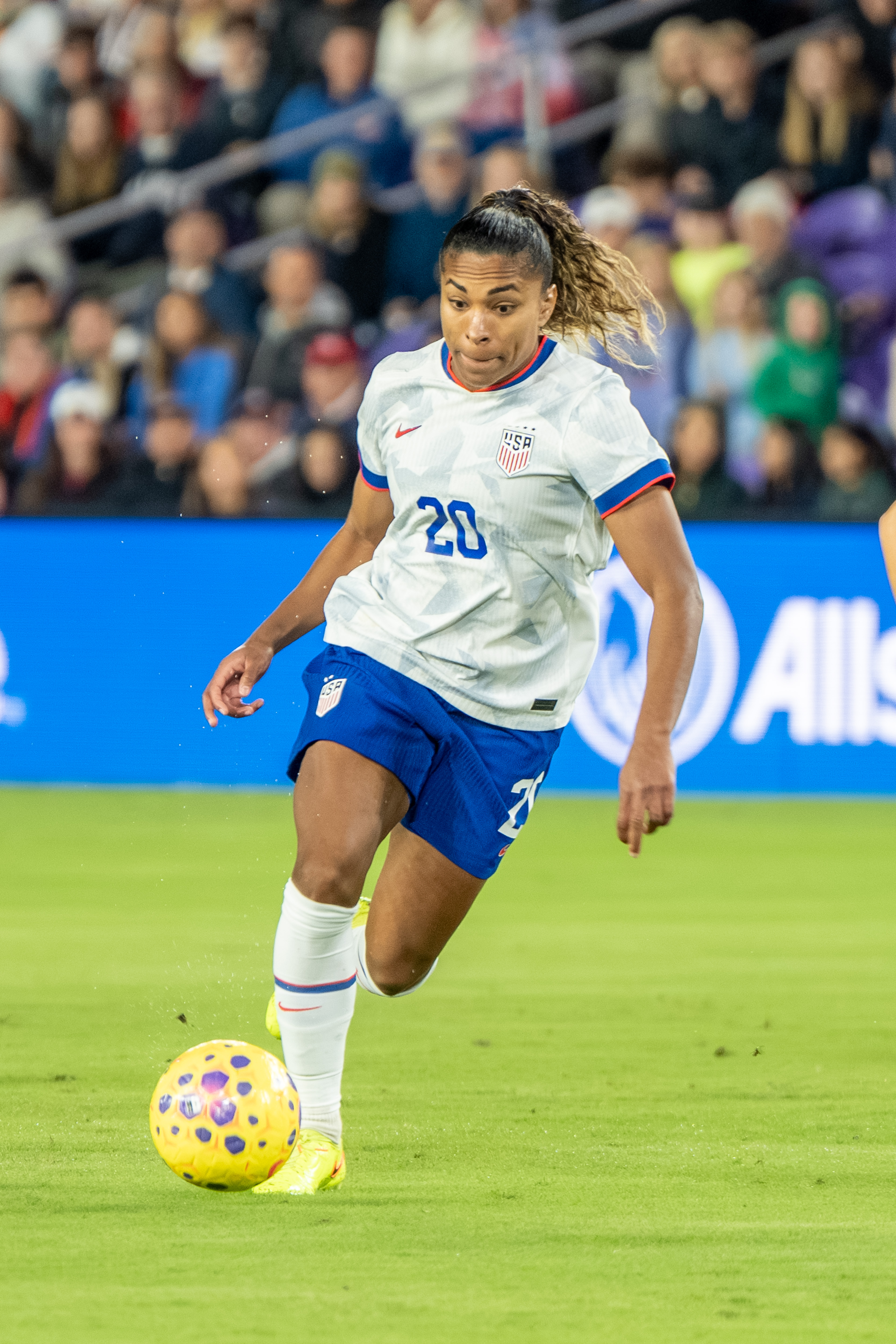
Catarina Macario with the USWNT in 2025

Macario is eligible to play internationally for Brazil and the United States. She was called to represent the United States at several youth levels. Macario stated that she intended to represent the United States at the senior level, turning down several approaches from the Brazilian Football Confederation. She generally plays as a midfielder for the United States, although Vlatko Andonovski has stated she could move to a false nine role in the future.

On October 8, 2020, Macario received her first call up to represent the United States at senior level, though she could not yet do this in games until she received clearance from FIFA. Later the same day, she announced on Twitter that she had acquired American citizenship. On January 13, 2021, U.S. Soccer announced that Macario received clearance from FIFA to represent the United States internationally. On January 18, 2021, Macario debuted for the United States, coming in the half-time of a friendly match against Colombia, thus becoming the first naturalized citizen ever to play for the US senior women's team. In the next game, another friendly against Colombia, she started for the first time, scoring her first international goal, on January 22, 2021.

On June 23, 2021, Macario was included in the United States roster for the 2020 Summer Olympics where they placed 3rd, earning Macario a bronze medal.

After missing the 2023 FIFA Women's World Cup due to an ACL injury she obtained with Lyon in 2022, Macario made her return to the United States national team for the 2024 SheBelieves Cup in April 2024. On June 26, 2024, Macario was selected by her former Chelsea coach Emma Hayes to the 18-player roster for the 2024 Summer Olympics in France. On July 12, it was announced that Macario would be withdrawing from the Olympics due to "knee irritation", and that Lynn Williams would replace her on the roster.

== Personal life ==
Despite declaring herself a fan of Marta, Macario stated that her favorite soccer player is American former forward Mia Hamm.

Macario graduated from Stanford University in 2021 with a BA in communications and minor in psychology.

== Career statistics ==
=== College ===
School	Season	Regular season			College Cup		Total	
School	Season	Division	Apps	Goals	Apps	Goals	Apps	Goals
Stanford Cardinal	2017	Div. I	19	14	6	3	25	17
Stanford Cardinal	2018	Div. I	14	12	5	2	19	14
Stanford Cardinal	2019	Div. I	19	23	6	9	25	32
NCAA Total			52	49	17	14	69	63

=== Club ===
As of match played December 10, 2025

Appearances and goals by club, season and competition
Club	Season	League			Cup (Note: Includes Women's FA Cup, FA Women's League Cup)		Continental (Note: Includes UEFA Women's Champions League)		Total	
Club	Season	Division	Apps	Goals	Apps	Goals	Apps	Goals	Apps	Goals
Lyon	2020–21	Division 1 Féminine	7	5	0	0	4	1	11	6
Lyon	2021–22	Division 1 Féminine	20	14	2	0	13	9	35	23
Lyon	Total		27	19	2	0	17	10	46	29
Chelsea	2023–24	FA WSL	8	1	3	1	4	0	15	2
Chelsea	2024–25	FA WSL	18	6	7	2	7	3	32	11
Chelsea	2025–26	FA WSL	9	0	0	0	3	2	12	2
Chelsea	Total		35	7	10	3	14	5	59	15
Career total			62	26	12	3	31	15	105	44

=== International ===
As of match played November 28, 2025

Appearances and goals by national team and year
National team	Year	Apps	Goals
United States	2021	12	3
United States	2022	5	5
United States	2023	0	0
United States	2024	2	0
United States	2025	10	8
Total		29	16

Scores and results list United States' goal tally first, score column indicates score after each Macario goal.

List of international goals scored by Catarina Macario
No.	Date	Location	Opponent	Score	Result	Competition	Ref.
1	January 22, 2021	Orlando, Florida, United States	Colombia	1–0	6–0	Friendly	
2	September 21, 2021	Cincinnati, Ohio, United States	Paraguay	5–0	8–0	Friendly	
3	September 21, 2021	Cincinnati, Ohio, United States	Paraguay	8–0	8–0	Friendly	
4	February 23, 2022	Frisco, Texas, United States	Iceland	1–0	5–0	2022 SheBelieves Cup	
5	February 23, 2022	Frisco, Texas, United States	Iceland	2–0	5–0	2022 SheBelieves Cup	
6	April 9, 2022	Columbus, Ohio, United States	Uzbekistan	5–0	9–1	Friendly	
7	April 12, 2022	Chester, Pennsylvania, United States	Uzbekistan	2–0	9–0	Friendly	
8	April 12, 2022	Chester, Pennsylvania, United States	Uzbekistan	6–0	9–0	Friendly	
9	February 20, 2025	Houston, Texas, United States	Colombia	1–0	2–0	2025 SheBelieves Cup	
10	April 8, 2025	San Jose, California, United States	Brazil	1–0	1–2	Friendly	
11	May 31, 2025	Saint Paul, Minnesota, United States	China	1–0	3–0	Friendly	
12	October 29, 2025	Kansas City, Missouri, United States	New Zealand	2–0	6–0	Friendly	
13	October 29, 2025	Kansas City, Missouri, United States	New Zealand	2–0	6–0	Friendly	
14	November 28, 2025	Orlando, Florida, United States	Italy	2–0	3–0	Friendly	
15	November 28, 2025	Orlando, Florida, United States	Italy	3–0	3–0	Friendly	
16	December 1, 2025	Fort Lauderdale, Florida, United States	Italy	1–0	2–0	Friendly	

== Honors ==
Stanford Cardinal

- NCAA Division I Women's Soccer Championship: 2017, 2019

Lyon

- Division 1 Féminine: 2021–22
- UEFA Women's Champions League: 2021–22

Chelsea

- Women's Super League: 2023–24, 2024–25
- Women's FA Cup: 2024–25
- FA Women's League Cup: 2024–25, 2025–26

United States

- SheBelieves Cup: 2021; 2022,2024
- Olympic Bronze Medal: 2021

Individual

- ESPNW Player of the Year: 2017, 2018
- Hermann Trophy: 2018, 2019
- CoSIDA Academic All-District 8 first team: 2018
- TopDrawerSoccer.com Freshman of the Year: 2017
- TopDrawerSoccer.com Player of the Year: 2018, 2019
- United Soccer Coaches First-Team All-America: 2017, 2018
- Pac-12 Forward of the Year: 2017, 2018
- Pac-12 Freshman of the Year: 2017
- Honda Sports Award: 2020
- Best Player SheBelieves Cup: 2022
