= 2022 SheBelieves Cup =

Tournament details
- Host country: United States
- Dates: February 17–23
- Teams: 4 (from 3 confederations)
- Venues: 2 (in 2 host cities)

Final positions
- Champions: United States (5th title)
- Runners-up: Iceland
- Third place: Czech Republic
- Fourth place: New Zealand

Tournament statistics
- Matches played: 6
- Goals scored: 14 (2.33 per match)
- Attendance: 38,378 (6,396 per match)
- Top scorer(s): (United States) Mallory Pugh (3 goals)
- Best player: (United States) Catarina Macario

The 2022 SheBelieves Cup, named the 2022 SheBelieves Cup Presented by Visa for sponsorship reasons, was the seventh edition of the SheBelieves Cup, an invitational women's soccer tournament held in the United States. Featuring national teams from Czech Republic, Iceland, New Zealand, and hosts United States, it began on February 17 and ended on February 23, 2022.

The United States defended their title, winning their third straight and fifth overall title. Catarina Macario was named the most valuable player of the tournament.

== Format ==
The four invited teams played a round-robin tournament. Points awarded in the group stage followed the formula of three points for a win, one point for a draw, and zero points for a loss. In the event two teams were tied in points, tie-breakers would be applied in the order of goal difference, goals scored, head-to-head result, and a fair play score based on the number of yellow and red cards.

== Venue ==
Carson (Los Angeles area)	Frisco (Dallas–Fort Worth area)
Dignity Health Sports Park	Toyota Stadium
Capacity: 27,000	Capacity: 20,500
2022 SheBelieves Cup is located in the United States

== Teams ==
Team	FIFA Ranking (December 2021)
United States	1
Iceland	16
New Zealand	22
Czech Republic	24

== Standings ==
Pos	Team	Pld	W	D	L	GF	GA	GD	Pts
1st place, gold medalist(s)	United States (H)	3	2	1	0	10	0	+10	7
2nd place, silver medalist(s)	Iceland	3	2	0	1	3	6	−3	6
3rd place, bronze medalist(s)	Czech Republic	3	0	2	1	1	2	−1	2
4	New Zealand	3	0	1	2	0	6	−6	1

Source: USSoccer
Rules for classification: 1) points; 2) goal difference; 3) goals scored; 4) head-to-head result; 5) fair play ranking.
(H) Hosts

== Results ==
February 17, 2022
17:00 PT

Iceland	1–0	New Zealand
Brynjarsdóttir 1'	Report

Dignity Health Sports Park, Carson, California
Attendance: 2,078
Referee: Katja Koroleva (United States)
February 17, 2022
20:00 PT

United States	0–0	Czech Republic
	Report

Dignity Health Sports Park, Carson, California
Attendance: 7,333
Referee: Laura Fortunato (Argentina)

February 20, 2022
12:00 PT

United States	5–0	New Zealand
Moore 5', 6', 36' (o.g.); Hatch 51'; Pugh 90+3'	Report

Dignity Health Sports Park, Carson, California
Attendance: 16,587
Referee: María Carvajal (Chile)
February 20, 2022
15:00 PT

Czech Republic	1–2	Iceland
Khýrová 85'	Report	Anasi 11'; Magnúsdóttir 18'

Dignity Health Sports Park, Carson, California
Attendance: 3,577
Referee: Natalie Simon (United States)

February 23, 2022
17:00 CT

New Zealand	0–0	Czech Republic
	Report

Toyota Stadium, Frisco, Texas
Attendance: 1,359
Referee: Danielle Chesky (United States)
February 23, 2022
20:00 CT

United States	5–0	Iceland
Macario 37', 45'; Pugh 60', 75'; K. Mewis 88'	Report

Toyota Stadium, Frisco, Texas
Attendance: 7,444
Referee: Edina Alves Batista (Brazil)

== Individual Award ==
Following the final game, the SheBelieves Cup awarded a Most Valuable Player (MVP) award, named the Visa SheBelieves Cup MVP for sponsorship reasons. A five-member selection committee made up of representatives from the four participating nations and one other person nominated four finalists for the award: U.S. forwards Catarina Macario and Sophia Smith, Iceland midfielder Dagný Brynjarsdóttir, and Czech Republic goalkeeper Barbora Votíková. Fans as well as the committee voted for a winner from the list of finalists, with Macario winning the MVP award.

== Goalscorers ==
There were 14 goals scored in 6 matches, for an average of 2.33 goals per match.

3 goals

- (United States) Mallory Pugh

2 goals

- (United States) Catarina Macario

1 goal

- (Czech Republic) Michaela Khýrová
- (Iceland) Natasha Anasi
- (Iceland) Dagný Brynjarsdóttir
- (Iceland) Selma Sól Magnúsdóttir
- (United States) Ashley Hatch
- (United States) Kristie Mewis

3 own goals

- (New Zealand) Meikayla Moore (all against the United States)
