= 2016 SheBelieves Cup =

Inaugural edition of the SheBelieves Cup

Tournament details
- Host country: United States
- Dates: March 3–9
- Teams: 4 (from 2 confederations)
- Venues: 3 (in 3 host cities)

Final positions
- Champions: United States (1st title)
- Runners-up: Germany
- Third place: England
- Fourth place: France

Tournament statistics
- Matches played: 6
- Goals scored: 9 (1.5 per match)
- Top scorer(s): (United States) Alex Morgan (2 goals)
- Best player: (United States) Alex Morgan
- Best goalkeeper: (United States) Hope Solo

The 2016 SheBelieves Cup was the inaugural edition of the SheBelieves Cup, an invitational women's soccer tournament held in the United States. It took place between March 3 and 9, 2016, before the 2016 Summer Olympics.

== Teams ==
Team	FIFA Rankings (December 2015)
United States	1
Germany	2
France	3
England	5

== Format ==
The four invited teams played a round-robin tournament.

Points awarded in the group stage followed the standard formula of three points for a win, one point for a draw and zero points for a loss.

== Venues ==
Tampa	Nashville	Boca Raton (Miami area)
Raymond James Stadium	Nissan Stadium	FAU Stadium
Capacity: 65,618	Capacity: 69,143	Capacity: 29,419
2016 SheBelieves Cup is located in the United States

== Results ==
The schedule was announced in January 2016.

Pos	Team	Pld	W	D	L	GF	GA	GD	Pts
1st place, gold medalist(s)	United States (H, C)	3	3	0	0	4	1	+3	9
2nd place, silver medalist(s)	Germany	3	2	0	1	4	3	+1	6
3rd place, bronze medalist(s)	England	3	0	1	2	1	3	−2	1
4	France	3	0	1	2	0	2	−2	1

Source: US Soccer
Rules for classification: 1) points; 2) Goal difference; 3) Goals scored; 4) head-to-head points; 5) head-to-head goal difference; 6) head-to-head number of goals scored; 7) FIFA ranking.
(C) Champions; (H) Hosts
March 3, 2016
17:00 EST
(UTC−05:00)

Germany	1–0	France
Maier 83'	Report

Raymond James Stadium, Tampa, Florida
Referee: Melissa Borjas (Honduras)
March 3, 2016
19:45 EST
(UTC−05:00)

United States	1–0	England
Dunn 72'	Report

Raymond James Stadium, Tampa, Florida
Attendance: 13,027
Referee: Tatiana Guzman (Nicaragua)

March 6, 2016
14:00 CST
(UTC−06:00)

United States	1–0	France
Morgan 90+1'	Report

Nissan Stadium, Nashville, Tennessee
Attendance: 25,363
Referee: Alondra Sandoval (Mexico)
March 6, 2016
16:30 CST
(UTC−06:00)

Germany	2–1	England
Flaherty 76' (o.g.); Peter 82' (pen.)	Report	Duggan 9'

Nissan Stadium, Nashville, Tennessee
Attendance: 25,363
Referee: Katja Koroleva (United States)

March 9, 2016
17:00 EST
(UTC−05:00)

France	0–0	England
	Report

FAU Stadium, Boca Raton, Florida
Referee: Gillian Martindale (Barbados)
March 9, 2016
19:45 EST
(UTC−05:00)

United States	2–1	Germany
Morgan 35'; Mewis 41'	Report	Mittag 29'

FAU Stadium, Boca Raton, Florida
Attendance: 13,501
Referee: Carol Chenard (Canada)

== Goalscorers ==
2 goals

- (United States) Alex Morgan

1 goal

- (England) Toni Duggan
- (Germany) Leonie Maier
- (Germany) Anja Mittag
- (Germany) Babett Peter
- (United States) Crystal Dunn
- (United States) Samantha Mewis

Own goal

- (England) Gilly Flaherty (playing against Germany)
