= 2023 SheBelieves Cup =

Tournament details
- Host country: United States
- Dates: February 16–22
- Teams: 4 (from 3 confederations)
- Venues: 3 (in 3 host cities)

Final positions
- Champions: United States (6th title)
- Runners-up: Japan
- Third place: Brazil
- Fourth place: Canada

Tournament statistics
- Matches played: 6
- Goals scored: 12 (2 per match)
- Attendance: 77,882 (12,980 per match)
- Top scorer(s): (United States) Mallory Swanson (4 goals)
- Best player: (United States) Mallory Swanson

The 2023 SheBelieves Cup, named the 2023 SheBelieves Cup Presented by Visa for sponsorship reasons, was the eighth edition of the SheBelieves Cup, an invitational women's soccer tournament held in the United States. Featuring national teams from Brazil, Canada, Japan, and the United States, the tournament lasted from February 16 to February 22, 2023. The United States emerged as champion, winning all three of its games.

== Format ==
The four invited teams played in a round-robin tournament. Points awarded in the group stage followed the formula of three points for a win, one point for a draw, and zero points for a loss. In the event two teams were tied in points, tie-breakers would be applied in the order of goal difference, goals scored, head-to-head result, and a fair play score based on the number of yellow and red cards.

== Venue ==
Orlando	Frisco (Dallas–Fort Worth area)	Nashville
Exploria Stadium	Toyota Stadium	Geodis Park
Capacity: 25,500	Capacity: 20,500	Capacity: 30,000
2023 SheBelieves Cup is located in the United States

== Teams ==
Team	FIFA Ranking (December 2022)
United States	1
Canada	6
Brazil	9
Japan	11

== Standings ==
Pos	Team	Pld	W	D	L	GF	GA	GD	Pts
1st place, gold medalist(s)	United States (H, C)	3	3	0	0	5	1	+4	9
2nd place, silver medalist(s)	Japan	3	1	0	2	3	2	+1	3
3rd place, bronze medalist(s)	Brazil	3	1	0	2	2	4	−2	3
4	Canada	3	1	0	2	2	5	−3	3

Source: Soccerway
Rules for classification: 1) points; 2) goal difference; 3) goals scored; 4) head-to-head result; 5) fair play ranking.
(C) Champions; (H) Hosts

== Results ==
All times are local. (The first two matches are UTC−5 and the remaining games are UTC−6.)

February 16, 2023
16:00

Japan	0–1	Brazil
	Report	Debinha 72'

Exploria Stadium, Orlando, Florida
Attendance: 6,453
Referee: Tori Penso (United States)
February 16, 2023
19:00

United States	2–0	Canada
Swanson 7', 34'	Report

Exploria Stadium, Orlando, Florida
Attendance: 14,697
Referee: Katia García (Mexico)

February 19, 2023
14:30

United States	1–0	Japan
Swanson 45'	Report

Geodis Park, Nashville, Tennessee
Attendance: 25,471
Referee: Myriam Marcotte (Canada)
February 19, 2023
17:30

Brazil	0–2	Canada
	Report	Gilles 31'; Viens 71'

Geodis Park, Nashville, Tennessee
Attendance: 6,502
Referee: Katja Koroleva (United States)

February 22, 2023
15:00

Canada	0–3	Japan
	Report	Seike 26'; Hasegawa 41' (pen.); Endo 77'

Toyota Stadium, Frisco, Texas
Attendance: 6,975
Referee: Danielle Chesky (United States)
February 22, 2023
18:00

United States	2–1	Brazil
Morgan 45+2'; Swanson 63'	Report	Ludmila 90'

Toyota Stadium, Frisco, Texas
Attendance: 17,784
Referee: Marie-Soleil Beaudoin (Canada)

== Goalscorers ==
There were 12 goals scored in 6 matches, for an average of 2 goals per match.

4 goals

- (United States) Mallory Swanson

1 goal

- (Brazil) Debinha
- (Brazil) Ludmila
- (Canada) Vanessa Gilles
- (Canada) Evelyne Viens
- (Japan) Jun Endo
- (Japan) Yui Hasegawa
- (Japan) Kiko Seike
- (United States) Alex Morgan
