= 2018 SheBelieves Cup =

Tournament details
- Host country: United States
- Dates: March 1–7
- Teams: 4 (from 2 confederations)
- Venues: 3 (in 3 host cities)

Final positions
- Champions: United States (2nd title)
- Runners-up: England
- Third place: France
- Fourth place: Germany

Tournament statistics
- Matches played: 6
- Goals scored: 16 (2.67 per match)
- Attendance: 74,621 (12,437 per match)
- Top scorer(s): (England) Ellen White (France) Eugénie Le Sommer (2 goals each)

The 2018 SheBelieves Cup was the third edition of the SheBelieves Cup, an invitational women's soccer tournament held in the United States. Featuring national teams from Germany, England, France, and hosts United States, it began on March 1 and ended on March 7, 2018, broadly running in parallel with the 2018 Algarve Cup, 2018 Turkish Women’s Cup, and the 2018 Cyprus Women's Cup.

The United States won the tournament. This marks the last participation of France and Germany to date.

== Format ==
The four invited teams played a round-robin tournament. Points awarded in the group stage followed the standard formula of three points for a win, one point for a draw, and zero points for a loss. A tie in points was decided by goal differential.

== Venues ==
| Columbus | Harrison (New York City area) | Orlando |
|---|---|---|
| MAPFRE Stadium | Red Bull Arena | Orlando City Stadium |
| Capacity: 19,968 | Capacity: 25,000 | Capacity: 25,500 |
2018 SheBelieves Cup is located in the United States

== Teams ==
| Team | FIFA Rankings (December 2017) |
|---|---|
| United States | 1 |
| Germany | 2 |
| England | 3 |
| France | 6 |

== Standings ==
| Pos | Team | Pld | W | D | L | GF | GA | GD | Pts |
|---|---|---|---|---|---|---|---|---|---|
| 1st place, gold medalist(s) | United States (H, C) | 3 | 2 | 1 | 0 | 3 | 1 | +2 | 7 |
| 2nd place, silver medalist(s) | England | 3 | 1 | 1 | 1 | 6 | 4 | +2 | 4 |
| 3rd place, bronze medalist(s) | France | 3 | 1 | 1 | 1 | 5 | 5 | 0 | 4 |
| 4 | Germany | 3 | 0 | 1 | 2 | 2 | 6 | −4 | 1 |

Source: USSoccer
Rules for classification: 1) points; 2) goal difference; 3) goals scored; 4) head-to-head points; 5) head-to-head goal difference; 6) head-to-head number of goals scored; 7) FIFA ranking.
(C) Champions; (H) Hosts

== Results ==
All times are local (UTC−5).

March 1, 2018
16:00

| England | 4–1 | France |
|---|---|---|
| Duggan 7'; Scott 28'; Taylor 39'; Kirby 46' | Report | Thiney 77' |

MAPFRE Stadium, Columbus, Ohio
Attendance: 7,566
Referee: Christina Unkel (United States)
March 1, 2018
19:00

| United States | 1–0 | Germany |
|---|---|---|
| Rapinoe 17' | Report |

MAPFRE Stadium, Columbus, Ohio
Attendance: 14,591
Referee: Melissa Borjas (Honduras)

March 4, 2018
12:00

| United States | 1–1 | France |
|---|---|---|
| Pugh 35' | Report | Le Sommer 38' |

Red Bull Arena, Harrison, New Jersey
Attendance: 25,706
Referee: Lucila Venegas (Mexico)
March 4, 2018
15:00

| Germany | 2–2 | England |
|---|---|---|
| Kayikçi 17'; Bright 51' (o.g.) | Report | White 18', 73' |

Red Bull Arena, Harrison, New Jersey
Attendance: 7,882
Referee: Karen Abt (United States)

March 7, 2018
16:00

| France | 3–0 | Germany |
|---|---|---|
| Henry 10'; Le Sommer 55'; Gauvin 68' | Report |

Orlando City Stadium, Orlando, Florida
Attendance: 6,525
Referee: Christina Unkel (United States)
March 7, 2018
19:00

| United States | 1–0 | England |
|---|---|---|
| Bardsley 58' (o.g.) | Report |

Orlando City Stadium, Orlando, Florida
Attendance: 12,351
Referee: Carol Anne Chenard (Canada)

== Goalscorers ==
There were 16 goals scored in 6 matches, for an average of 2.67 goals per match.

2 goals

- (England) Ellen White
- (France) Eugénie Le Sommer

1 goal

- (England) Toni Duggan
- (England) Fran Kirby
- (England) Jill Scott
- (England) Jodie Taylor
- (France) Valérie Gauvin
- (France) Amandine Henry
- (France) Gaëtane Thiney
- (Germany) Hasret Kayikçi
- (United States) Mallory Pugh
- (United States) Megan Rapinoe

1 own goal

- (England) Millie Bright (vs. Germany)
- (England) Karen Bardsley (vs. United States)
