= SheBelieves Cup =

Football tournament

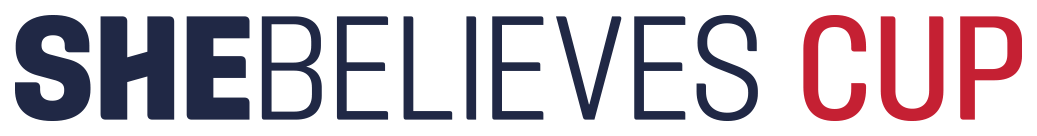
- Organizer(s): United States Soccer Federation
- Founded: 2016; 10 years ago
- Region: United States
- Teams: 4
- Current champion: United States (8th title)
- Most championships: United States (8 titles)
- Website: Official website
- 2026 SheBelieves Cup

The SheBelieves Cup is an invitational women's soccer tournament held in different cities in the United States in late February to early March. In its first three years (2016, 2017, and 2018), it was contested by the same four teams: the United States, England, France, and Germany. Since 2019, the tournament lineup has featured different teams each year.

The SheBelieves Cup is played at the same time of year as other invitational tournaments such as the Algarve Cup, the Arnold Clark Cup, the Cup of Nations, the Cyprus Women's Cup, the Istria Cup, the Pinatar Cup, the Tournoi de France, the Turkish Women's Cup, and the Women's Revelations Cup.

== History ==
The SheBelieves movement was inspired by the US national team in their 2015 run-up to the World Cup. SheBelieves, a US Soccer strategy and marketing campaign, is meant to encourage young women to achieve their dreams, regardless of whether or not they are tied to athletics. SheBelieves is dedicated to women's empowerment, a theme which has evolved into a bond between US Soccer and its fans as the team has spread this message to communities across the country. The United States Soccer Federation serves as SheBelieves Ambassadors, launching a new program to unite and elevate nonprofits, women's sports organizations, and influencers with the shared goal of positively impacting girls and women.

== SheBelieves Summit ==
The SheBelieves Summit is a major component of programming around the tournament itself. Its purpose is to empower young women and girls using the three core pillars of SheBelieves: confidence, career, and community. The summit includes panels, fireside chats, and breakout sessions designed to provide event attendees with hands-on experience and tools for success. Event programming features various female speakers, from women in STEM to professional athletes. It took place virtually in 2021 because of the COVID-19 pandemic.

In its third year in 2021, some notable speakers for the event included

- Abby Wambach
- Sage Steele
- Cindy Parlow Cone
- Tierna Davidson
- Danielle Slaton
- Cathy Engelbert

== Tournament format ==
The four invited teams play in a round-robin tournament, held over three match days in different cities. Points awarded in the group stage followed the formula of three points for a win, one point for a draw, and zero points for a loss. In the 2026 edition, any draw was followed by a penalty shoot-out, with the winner of it receiving an additional point. A tie in points would be decided by goal difference; other tie-breakers are used as needed in the following order: goal difference, goals scored, head-to-head result, and a fair play score based on the number of yellow and red cards.

For the 2024 edition only, due to the change in FIFA competition windows and the staging of the CONCACAF W Gold Cup in February and March, the format was changed, with four matches in a bracket format instead of the usual six in a round-robin format. The teams only played semifinals, a third-place game, and the championship game.

== Results ==
| # | Year | Champion | Runner-up | Third place | Fourth place | Teams |
|---|---|---|---|---|---|---|
| 1 | 2016 | United States | Germany | England | France | 4 |
| 2 | 2017 | France | Germany | England | United States | 4 |
| 3 | 2018 | United States | England | France | Germany | 4 |
| 4 | 2019 | England | United States | Japan | Brazil | 4 |
| 5 | 2020 | United States | Spain | England | Japan | 4 |
| 6 | 2021 | United States | Brazil | Canada | Argentina | 4 |
| 7 | 2022 | United States | Iceland | Czech Republic | New Zealand | 4 |
| 8 | 2023 | United States | Japan | Brazil | Canada | 4 |
| 9 | 2024 | United States | Canada | Brazil | Japan | 4 |
| 10 | 2025 | Japan | United States | Colombia | Australia | 4 |
| 11 | 2026 | United States | Canada | Colombia | Argentina | 4 |

== Medals ==
* Host nation (United States)

| Rank | Nation | Gold | Silver | Bronze | Total |
|---|---|---|---|---|---|
| 1 | United States* | 8 | 2 | 0 | 10 |
| 2 | England | 1 | 1 | 3 | 5 |
| 3 | Japan | 1 | 1 | 1 | 3 |
| 4 | France | 1 | 0 | 1 | 2 |
| 5 | Canada | 0 | 2 | 1 | 3 |
| 6 | Germany | 0 | 2 | 0 | 2 |
| 7 | Brazil | 0 | 1 | 2 | 3 |
| 8 | Iceland | 0 | 1 | 0 | 1 |
| 8 | Spain | 0 | 1 | 0 | 1 |
| 10 | Colombia | 0 | 0 | 2 | 2 |
| 11 | Czech Republic | 0 | 0 | 1 | 1 |
| Totals (11 entries) | | 11 | 11 | 11 | 33 |

== Nations ==
| Team | 2016 | 2017 | 2018 | 2019 | 2020 | 2021 | 2022 | 2023 | 2024 | 2025 | 2026 | Years |
|---|---|---|---|---|---|---|---|---|---|---|---|---|
| Argentina | – | – | – | – | – | 4th | – | – | – | – | 4th | 2 |
| Australia | – | – | – | – | – | – | – | – | – | 4th | – | 1 |
| Brazil | – | – | – | 4th | – | 2nd | – | 3rd | 3rd | – | – | 4 |
| Canada | – | – | – | – | – | 3rd | – | 4th | 2nd | – | 2nd | 4 |
| Colombia | – | – | – | – | – | – | – | – | – | 3rd | 3rd | 2 |
| Czech Republic | – | – | – | – | – | – | 3rd | – | – | – | – | 1 |
| England | 3rd | 3rd | 2nd | 1st | 3rd | – | – | – | – | – | – | 5 |
| France | 4th | 1st | 3rd | – | – | – | – | – | – | – | – | 3 |
| Germany | 2nd | 2nd | 4th | – | – | – | – | – | – | – | – | 3 |
| Iceland | – | – | – | – | – | – | 2nd | – | - | – | – | 1 |
| Japan | – | – | – | 3rd | 4th | – | – | 2nd | 4th | 1st | – | 5 |
| New Zealand | – | – | – | – | – | – | 4th | – | – | – | – | 1 |
| Spain | – | – | – | – | 2nd | – | – | – | – | – | – | 1 |
| United States | 1st | 4th | 1st | 2nd | 1st | 1st | 1st | 1st | 1st | 2nd | 1st | 11 |
| Total (14) | 4 | 4 | 4 | 4 | 4 | 4 | 4 | 4 | 4 | 4 | 4 | |

== Summary ==
As of March 7, 2026

Although the 2024 tournament was played as a bracket and thus did not award points to teams, wins (including penalty shoot-out wins) from that year are given three points here. And in 2026, any drawn game was immediately followed by a penalty shoot-out whose winner received an additional point, indicated here by PSP (penalty shoot-out point).

| Rank | Team | Part | M | W | D | L | PSP | GF | GA | GD | Points |
|---|---|---|---|---|---|---|---|---|---|---|---|
| 1 | United States (host) | 11 | 32 | 24 | 5 | 3 | 0 | 56 | 18 | +38 | 77 |
| 2 | England | 5 | 15 | 5 | 3 | 7 | 0 | 17 | 16 | +1 | 18 |
| 3 | Japan | 5 | 14 | 5 | 2 | 7 | 0 | 22 | 20 | +1 | 17 |
| 4 | Canada | 4 | 11 | 3 | 3 | 5 | 1 | 10 | 13 | −3 | 13 |
| 5 | France | 3 | 9 | 3 | 3 | 3 | 0 | 10 | 8 | +2 | 12 |
| 6 | Brazil | 4 | 11 | 4 | 0 | 7 | 0 | 12 | 15 | −3 | 12 |
| 7 | Germany | 3 | 9 | 3 | 2 | 4 | 0 | 7 | 10 | −3 | 11 |
| 8 | Spain | 1 | 3 | 2 | 0 | 1 | 0 | 4 | 2 | +2 | 6 |
| 9 | Iceland | 1 | 3 | 2 | 0 | 1 | 0 | 3 | 6 | −3 | 6 |
| 10 | Colombia | 2 | 6 | 2 | 0 | 3 | 0 | 5 | 12 | –7 | 6 |
| 11 | Czech Republic | 1 | 3 | 0 | 2 | 1 | 0 | 1 | 2 | −1 | 2 |
| 12 | New Zealand | 1 | 3 | 0 | 1 | 2 | 0 | 0 | 6 | −6 | 1 |
| 13 | Argentina | 2 | 6 | 0 | 1 | 5 | 0 | 1 | 14 | −13 | 1 |
| 14 | Australia | 1 | 3 | 0 | 0 | 3 | 0 | 2 | 8 | –6 | 0 |

== Best player ==
Through 2019, this table shows the player(s) with the most goals. Beginning in 2020, a “Best Player” or “Most Valuable Player” was designated at the conclusion of the tournament.

| Year | Player |
|---|---|
| 2016 | (United States) Alex Morgan |
| 2017 | (France) Camille Abily |
| 2018 | (France) Eugénie Le Sommer (England) Ellen White |
| 2019 | (United States) Tobin Heath (England) Beth Mead (Japan) Yuka Momiki (United States) Megan Rapinoe |
| 2020 | (Spain) Alexia Putellas |
| 2021 | (United States) Rose Lavelle |
| 2022 | (United States) Catarina Macario |
| 2023 | (United States) Mallory Swanson |
| 2024 | (United States) Sophia Smith |
| 2025 | (Japan) Mina Tanaka |
| 2026 | (United States) Alyssa Thompson |

== Top goalscorers ==
As of March 7, 2026Boldface indicates a player who is still active.

| Rank | Name | Total |
|---|---|---|
| 1 | (United States) **Mallory Swanson** | 8 |
| 2 | (United States) Megan Rapinoe | 7 |
| 3 | (England) Ellen White | 5 |
| 3 | (United States) Alex Morgan | 5 |
| 3 | (Japan) **Mina Tanaka** | 5 |
| 6 | (Brazil) **Debinha** | 4 |
| 6 | (United States) Christen Press | 4 |
| 8 | (Canada) **Vanessa Gilles** | 3 |
| 8 | (United States) **Lindsey Heaps** | 3 |
| 8 | (France) **Eugénie Le Sommer** | 3 |
| 8 | (United States) **Catarina Macario** | 3 |
| 8 | (United States) **Ally Sentnor** | 3 |

== Most wins ==
As of 2026, Emily Sonnett has been on the championship team 8 times, the most of any player. She is also the only player to have participated in all 11 editions of the tournament.
