= Madagascar women's national football team results =

This article lists the results and fixtures for the Madagascar women's national football team.

The national team's first activity was in 2015, when they participated in the African games women's qualification against Botswana. They finished second in the 2015 Indian Ocean Games, losing only one game out of four, they participated in the COSAFA Women's Championship annually since 2017 until 2019 where the team got inactive, Madagascar is ranked 181 in the FIFA Women's World Rankings.

== Record per opponent ==
Key

Positive balance (more wins than losses)
Neutral balance (as many wins as losses)
Negative balance (more losses than wins)

The following table shows Madagascar' all-time official international record per opponent:

Opponent	Pld	W	D	L	GF	GA	GD	W%	Confederation
Botswana	3	1	1	1	2	3	−1	50.00	CAF
Comoros	3	3	0	0	13	1	+12	100.00	CAF
Eswatini	1	0	0	1	1	2	-1	00.00	CAF
Malawi	4	0	0	4	4	13	-9	00.00	CAF
Mauritius	1	1	0	0	5	0	+5	100.00	CAF
Réunion	2	0	1	1	3	5	-2	00.00	CAF
Seychelles	1	1	0	0	8	2	+6	100.00	CAF
South Africa	3	0	0	3	2	8	-6	00.00	CAF
Zambia	1	0	0	1	1	7	-6	00.00	CAF
Zimbabwe	1	0	0	1	0	4	-4	00.00	CAF
Total	20	6	2	12	39	45	-6	30.00	—

Last updated: Madagascar vs Malawi, 10 October 2023.

== Results ==
=== 2015 ===
22 February 2015 Football at the 2015 African Games – Women's qualification First Round 1st leg	Madagascar	1–3	Botswana	Antananarivo, Madagascar
14:30	Mamiseheno 26'	Report	Ramafifi 12'; Moahi 33'; Bosa 55'	Stadium: Mahamasina Municipal Stadium; Referee: Maria Rivet (Mauritius)

6 March 2015 Football at the 2015 African Games – Women's qualification First Round 2nd leg	Botswana	0–1	Madagascar	Gaborone, Botswana
18:00		Report	Raharimalala 22'	Stadium: Botswana National Stadium; Referee: Thérèse Sylvie Abou'ou (Cameroon)

31 July 2015 Football at the 2015 Indian Ocean Island Games – Women GS	Madagascar	5–0	Mauritius	Saint-Denis, Réunion
	Farafanirina 4', 25', 60'; Ramiseheno 7', 37'	Report

2 August 2015 Football at the 2015 Indian Ocean Island Games – Women GS	Réunion	2–2 (7–8 p)	Madagascar	Saint-Denis, Réunion
	Gorée 48' (pen.); Grondin 90+3'	Report	Farafanirina 31', 83'

6 August 2015 Football at the 2015 Indian Ocean Island Games – Women SF	Madagascar	8–2	Seychelles	Saint-Benoît, Réunion
	Farafanirina 12' (pen.), 32', 37'; Ravaosoloarimalala 15', 57'; Tshohy 20', 28'; Ramiseheno 78'	Report	Bibi 1' (pen.), 60' (pen.)	Stadium: Stade Jean-Allane

8 August 2015 Football at the 2015 Indian Ocean Island Games – Women Final	Réunion	3–1	Madagascar	Saint-Denis, Réunion
	Lambert 32'; Palma 45+1'; Grondin 55'	Report	Razanampiavy 14'	Stadium: Stade Jean-Ivoula

=== 2016 ===
5 December 2016 Friendly	Madagascar	4–0	Comoros	Mahajanga, Madagascar
	Farafanirina 40', 45+1'; Solonilaina 50'; Razanampiavy 80'	Report		Stadium: Rabemananjara Stadium

8 December 2016 Friendly	Madagascar	4–0	Comoros	Mahajanga, Madagascar
	Farafanirina 19', 60', 77'; Rasoanandrasana 90+2'	Report		Stadium: Rabemananjara Stadium

=== 2017 ===
13 September 2017 2017 COSAFA Women's Championship Group A	Zimbabwe	4–0	Madagascar	Bulawayo, Zimbabwe
16:30	Makore 42', 48', 76', 79'	Report		Stadium: Barbourfields Stadium

15 September 2017 2017 COSAFA Women's Championship Group A	Madagascar	3–6	Malawi	Bulawayo, Zimbabwe
10:30	Farafanirina 54', 69'; Razafindrabe 65'	Report	Ta. Chawinga 22', 37', 87', 90'; Te. Chawinga 45', 49'	Stadium: Barbourfields Stadium

17 September 2017 2017 COSAFA Women's Championship Group A	Zambia	7–1	Madagascar	Bulawayo, Zimbabwe
14:00	M. Zulu 6'; Banda 11', 22'; Chanda 50'; Sosala 68'; Chileshe 80'; Nachula 81'	Report	Farafanirina 20'	Stadium: Barbourfields Stadium

=== 2018 ===
12 September 2018 2018 COSAFA Women's Championship Group A	South Africa	2–1	Madagascar	KwaZakele, South Africa
15:30	Xesi 7'; Vilakazi 20'	Report	Rasoanandrasana 22' (pen.)	Stadium: Wolfson Stadium

14 September 2018 2018 COSAFA Women's Championship Group A	Madagascar	0–2	Malawi	KwaZakele, South Africa
10:00		Report	Kasenda 18'; Kapanda 81'	Stadium: Wolfson Stadium

17 September 2018 2018 COSAFA Women's Championship Group A	Botswana	0–0	Madagascar	Port Elizabeth, South Africa
15:30		Report		Stadium: Gelvandale Stadium

=== 2019 ===
31 July 2019 2019 COSAFA Women's Championship Group A	Malawi	2–0	Madagascar	KwaZakele, South Africa
12:45	Vinkhumbu 81'; Kapanda 88'	Report		Stadium: Wolfson Stadium

2 August 2019 2019 COSAFA Women's Championship Group A	Comoros	1–5	Madagascar	KwaZakele, South Africa
10:00	Mari 41'	Report	Nivonirina 1'; Razanampiavy 3'; Rasoanandrasana 20', 51'; Razananivo 45+2'	Stadium: Wolfson Stadium

5 August 2019 2019 COSAFA Women's Championship Group A	South Africa	3–0	Madagascar	KwaZakele, South Africa
12:45	Fulutudilu 9'; Jane 38'; Razafimanantsoa 77' (o.g.)	Report		Stadium: Wolfson Stadium

=== 2023 ===
4 October 2023 2023 COSAFA WC GS	Madagascar	1–2	Eswatini	Pretoria, South Africa
12:00 UTC+2	Raharimalala 28'	Report	Ngcamphalala 46'; Magagula 81'	Stadium: Lucas Moripe Stadium

10 October 2023 2023 COSAFA WC GS	South Africa	3–1	Madagascar	Johannesburg, South Africa
15:30 UTC+2	T. Shamase 14' (pen.); Selana 65', 78'		Velomanantsolo 43'	Stadium: Dobsonville Stadium; Referee: Vistoria Shangula (Namibia)

12 October 2023 2023 COSAFA WC GS	Madagascar	1–3	Malawi	Johannesburg, South Africa
15:30 UTC+2	Randrianarivelo 33' (pen.)	Report	Chikupira 23'; Chinyamula 25'; Simwaka 35'	Stadium: UJ Stadium; Referee: Antsino Twanyanyukwa (Namibia)

== See also ==
- Madagascar national football team results
