= 2017 in Kenyan football =

Football in Kenya
- Season: 2017

The following article is a summary of the 2017 football season in Kenya, which is the 53rd competitive season in its history.

== Domestic leagues ==
=== Promotion and relegation ===
Relegated from Premier League

- Nairobi City Stars
- Ushuru

Promoted to Premier League

- Kariobangi Sharks
- Nakumatt
- Nzoia Sugar (formerly Nzoia United)
- Zoo Kericho

=== Premier League ===
The 2017 Kenyan Premier League season began on 11 March and is scheduled to end on 18 November.

Pos	Team	Pld	W	D	L	GF	GA	GD	Pts	Qualification or relegation
1	Gor Mahia (C, Q)	34	22	8	4	53	22	+31	74	Qualification for 2018 CAF Champions League
2	Sofapaka	34	15	10	9	48	31	+17	55	
3	Kariobangi Sharks	34	13	13	8	42	26	+16	52	
4	Posta Rangers	34	11	18	5	28	22	+6	51	
5	Kakamega Homeboyz	34	12	14	8	30	23	+7	50	
6	Tusker	34	14	8	12	33	34	−1	50	
7	Ulinzi Stars	34	12	12	10	37	29	+8	48	
8	A.F.C. Leopards (Q)	34	12	9	13	26	28	−2	45	Qualification for 2018 CAF Confederation Cup (Note: A.F.C. Leopards qualified for the 2018 CAF Confederation Cup as winners of the 2017 FKF President's Cup.)
9	Nzoia Sugar	34	11	11	12	41	40	+1	44	
10	Bandari	34	12	7	15	34	33	+1	43	
11	SoNy Sugar	34	10	13	11	31	30	+1	43	
12	Zoo Kericho	34	9	13	12	39	49	−10	40	
13	Mathare United	34	8	15	11	32	36	−4	39	
14	Chemelil Sugar	34	8	15	11	28	34	−6	39	
15	Nakumatt	34	10	9	15	33	41	−8	39	Relegation to National Super League
16	Thika United	34	8	14	12	27	36	−9	38	Relegation to National Super League
17	Western Stima	34	9	11	14	31	41	−10	38	Relegation to National Super League
18	Muhoroni Youth	34	5	10	19	27	65	−38	25	Relegation to National Super League

Updated to match(es) played on 18 November 2017. Source: Soccerway.com
Rules for classification: 1) points; 2) goal difference; 3) goals scored; 4) playoff.
(C) Champions; (Q) Qualified for the phase indicated

== International club competitions ==
=== Champions League ===
The 2017 CAF Champions League began on 10 February and is scheduled to end on 5 November. Tusker represented Kenya in the competition, having won the 2016 Kenyan Premier League.

==== Preliminary round ====
In the preliminary round, Tusker faced 2015–16 Mauritian League winners AS Port-Louis 2000 over two legs, played on 11 and 19 February. They were eliminated after losing 3–2 on aggregate.

11 February 2017	Tusker (Kenya)	1–1	(Mauritius) AS Port-Louis 2000	Kasarani, Nairobi
15:00 UTC+3	Batambuze 29'	Report	Guikan 48'	Stadium: Moi International Sports Centre; Referee: Belay Tadesse (Ethiopia)

19 February 2017	AS Port-Louis 2000 (Mauritius)	2–1	(Kenya) Tusker	Curepipe, Plaines Wilhems
15:15 UTC+4	Guikan 84', 88'	Report	Sempala 37'	Stadium: Stade George V Referee: Andofetra Rakotojaona (Madagascar)

=== Confederation Cup ===
The 2017 CAF Confederation Cup began on 10 February and is scheduled to end on 26 November. Ulinzi Stars represented Kenya in the competition, having lost the 2016 FKF President's Cup final to league champions Tusker.

==== Preliminary round ====
In the preliminary round, Ulinzi Stars faced 2016 Libyan Cup runners-up Al-Hilal Benghazi over two legs, played on 10 and 18 February. They advanced to the first round after winning 5–4 on penalties, having drawn 1–1 on aggregate.

10 February 2017	Al-Hilal Benghazi (Libya)	1–0	(Kenya) Ulinzi Stars	Al Salam City, Cairo (Egypt) (Note: Teams from Libya were not allowed to host their home matches in their country due to security concerns.)
16:00 UTC+2	Al-Abbar 47'	Report		Stadium: Al Salam Stadium; Referee: Haythem Guirat (Tunisia)

18 February 2017	Ulinzi Stars (Kenya)	1–0 (5–4 p)	(Libya) Al-Hilal Benghazi	Kasarani, Nairobi
15:00 UTC+3	Onyango 17'	Report		Stadium: Moi International Sports Centre; Referee: Kabanga Yannick Malala (DR Congo)
	Penalties
	Wamalwa (penalty scored); Oketch (penalty scored); Ochieng (penalty missed); Onyango (penalty scored); Makwatta (penalty scored); Mbongi (penalty scored)		(penalty scored) Al Badri; (penalty scored) Sanogo; (penalty missed) Al-Shaafi; (penalty scored) Maetouq; (penalty scored) Al-Amami; (penalty missed) Al-Amshi

==== First round ====
In the first round, Ulinzi Stars faced 2015–16 Egyptian Premier League second runners-up Smouha over two legs, played on 10 and 18 March. They were eliminated after losing 4–3 on aggregate.

10 March 2017	Smouha (Egypt)	4–0	(Kenya) Ulinzi Stars	Borg El Arab, Alexandria
18:00 UTC+2	Raouf 12'; Mohareb 26', 87'; Abdel Aziz 70'	Report		Stadium: Borg El Arab Stadium; Referee: Mahmood Ali Mahmood Ismail (Sudan)

18 March 2017	Ulinzi Stars (Kenya)	3–0	(Egypt) Smouha	Machakos, Machakos
15:00 UTC+3	Onyango 10', 37'; Mbongi 70'	Report		Stadium: Kenyatta Stadium; Referee: Jean Claude Ishimwe (Rwanda)

== National teams ==
=== Men's senior ===
==== Africa Cup of Nations qualification ====
The men's senior national team is participating in qualification for the 2019 Africa Cup of Nations. They were drawn in Group F alongside Ghana, Ethiopia and Sierra Leone.

Pos	Team	Pld	W	D	L	GF	GA	GD	Pts	Qualification
1	Ghana	4	3	0	1	8	1	+7	9	Final tournament
2	Kenya	4	2	1	1	4	1	+3	7	Final tournament
3	Ethiopia	4	0	1	3	0	10	−10	1	
4	Sierra Leone	0	0	0	0	0	0	0	0	Disqualified (Note: On 30 November 2018, the CAF decided to disqualify Sierra Leone from the qualifiers, and all their matches were annulled, due to FIFA's suspension of the Sierra Leone Football Association on 5 October 2018.)

Source: CAF
Notes:

10 June 2017	Sierra Leone	2–1	Kenya	Congo Town, Freetown
16:30 UTC+0	Wobay 22'; Bangura 69' (pen.)	Report	Olunga 75'	Stadium: National Stadium; Referee: Ferdinand Udoh (Nigeria)

==== Other matches ====
The following is a list of all other matches (to be) played by the men's senior national team in 2017.

23 March 2017 Friendly	Kenya	1–1	Uganda	Machakos, Machakos
12:00 UTC+3	Olunga 35'	Report	Waiswa 87'	Stadium: Kenyatta Stadium

26 March 2017 Friendly	Kenya	2–1	DR Congo	Machakos, Machakos
13:00 UTC+3	Olunga 6', 71'	Report	Kakuta 60'	Stadium: Kenyatta Stadium

2 September 2017 Friendly	Mozambique	1–1	Kenya	Zimpeto, Maputo
19:00 UTC+2	Domingues 59'	Report	Omondi 85'	Stadium: Estádio do Zimpeto

5 October 2017 Friendly	Iraq	2–1	Kenya	Basra, Basra
19:00 UTC+2	Nouri 18' (pen.); Khalaf 45+2'	Report	Olunga 86'	Stadium: Basra Sports City

8 October 2017 Friendly	Thailand	1–0	Kenya	Muang Thong Thani, Nonthaburi
15:30 UTC+7	Dangda 63'	Report		Stadium: SCG Stadium

=== Women's senior ===
==== COSAFA Women's Championship ====
The women's senior national team was invited to participate in the 2017 COSAFA Women's Championship, which took place in Zimbabwe from 13 to 24 September 2017.

===== Group stage =====
Kenya was drawn in Group B alongside Mauritius, Mozambique and Swaziland. They advanced to the knockout stage after finishing top of the group with 9 points from 3 games.

Pos	Team	Pld	W	D	L	GF	GA	GD	Pts	Qualification
1	Kenya (G)	3	3	0	0	17	2	+15	9	Advance to knockout stage
2	Swaziland	3	1	1	1	5	3	+2	4	
3	Mozambique	3	1	1	1	7	7	0	4	
4	Mauritius	3	0	0	3	0	17	−17	0	

(G) Guests

14 September 2017	Kenya	5–2	Mozambique	Bulawayo, Bulawayo
16:30 UTC+2	Okoth 23', 58', 87'; Adam 84'; Owiti 90+1'	Report	Lucia 9'; Cidalia 49'	Stadium: Luveve Stadium

16 September 2017	Kenya	11–0	Mauritius	Bulawayo, Bulawayo
10:30 UTC+2	Adam 9', 85'; Okoth 25', 32', 45+5', 51'; Mukhwana 34', 49'; Avilia 54'; Shikobe 79'; Rassoie 90+2' (o.g.)	Report		Stadium: Luveve Stadium

18 September 2017	Kenya	1–0	Eswatini	Bulawayo, Bulawayo
14:00 UTC+2	Achieng 90'	Report		Stadium: Luveve Stadium

==== Knockout stage ====
Kenya finished the knockout stage in fourth place after losing their semi-final to Zimbabwe and the bronze medal match to Zambia on penalties.

21 September 2017 Semi-final	Kenya	0–4	Zimbabwe	Bulawayo, Bulawayo
16:00 UTC+2		Report	Makore 11'; Kabwe 45'; Nyaumwe 53'; Mupeti 89'	Stadium: Barbourfields Stadium

23 September 2017 Bronze medal match	Zambia	1–1 (4–2 p)	Kenya	Bulawayo, Bulawayo
13:00 UTC+2	Banda 72'	Report	Okoth 30'	Stadium: Barbourfields Stadium
	Penalties
	Lungu (penalty scored); Mulenga (penalty scored); Chisamu (penalty scored); Zulu (penalty scored)		(penalty scored) Shikobe; (penalty missed) Mukhwana; (penalty scored) Okoth; (penalty missed) Msungu
