= Football at the 2015 African Games – Men's qualification =

2015 African Games men's football tournament qualification
Tournament details
- Dates: 21 February – 12 April
- Teams: 24 (from 1 confederation)

Tournament statistics
- Matches played: 24
- Goals scored: 45 (1.88 per match)
- Top scorer(s): (Egypt) Kahraba (4 goals)

The 2015 African Games men's football tournament qualification decided the participating teams of the 2015 African Games men's football tournament. A total of eight teams qualified to play in the men's football tournament, including Congo who qualified automatically as hosts. Both the qualifying rounds and the final tournament were age-restricted and open to men's under-23 national teams only.

== Teams ==
A total of 24 teams entered the qualifying rounds, organized by the Confederation of African Football (CAF).

Round	Teams entering round	No. of teams
First round	Burkina Faso; Burundi; DR Congo; Egypt; Ethiopia; Gabon; Guinea-Bissau; Ivory Coast; Kenya; Libya; Madagascar; Mali; Mozambique; Nigeria; Sudan; Swaziland; Tunisia; Uganda; Zambia; Zimbabwe	20
Second round	Cameroon; Ghana; Senegal; South Africa	4
Qualifying rounds	Total	24
Final tournament	Congo (hosts)	1

Did not enter
- Algeria
- Angola
- Benin
- Botswana
- Cape Verde
- Central African Republic
- Chad
- Comoros
- Djibouti
- Equatorial Guinea
- Eritrea
- Gambia
- Guinea
- Lesotho
- Liberia
- Malawi
- Mauritania
- Mauritius
- Morocco
- Namibia
- Niger
- Rwanda
- São Tomé and Príncipe
- Seychelles
- Sierra Leone
- Somalia
- South Sudan
- Tanzania
- Togo

== Format ==
Qualification ties were played on a home-and-away two-legged basis. If the aggregate score was tied after the second leg, the away goals rule would be applied, and if still level, the penalty shoot-out would be used to determine the winner (no extra time would be played).

The seven winners of the second round qualified for the final tournament.

== Schedule ==
The schedule of the qualifying rounds was as follows.

Round	Leg	Date
First round	First leg	20–22 February 2015
First round	Second leg	6–8 March 2015
Second round	First leg	20–22 March 2015
Second round	Second leg	10–12 April 2015

== Qualification rounds ==
=== First round ===
Team 1	Agg.	Team 2	1st leg	2nd leg
Burkina Faso	w/o	Libya	—	—
Ivory Coast	w/o	Guinea-Bissau	—	—
DR Congo	1–2	Burundi	0–1	1–1
Egypt	4–1	Kenya	3–0	1–1
Gabon	1–6	Nigeria	1–4	0–2
Zambia	w/o	Madagascar	—	—
Mali	w/o	Tunisia	—	—
Mozambique	0–0 (4–1 p)	Uganda	0–0	0–0
Swaziland	w/o	Zimbabwe	—	—
Ethiopia	1–4	Sudan	1–2	0–2

Note: Libya, Guinea-Bissau, Madagascar, Tunisia and Swaziland withdrew.

20 February 2015

Burkina Faso	Cancelled	Libya
	Report

6 March 2015

Libya	Cancelled	Burkina Faso
	Report

Burkina Faso won on walkover.

20 February 2015

Ivory Coast	Cancelled	Guinea-Bissau
	Report

6 March 2015

Guinea-Bissau	Cancelled	Ivory Coast
	Report

Ivory Coast won on walkover.

21 February 2015
15:30 UTC+1

DR Congo	0–1	Burundi
	Report	Nshimirimana 50'

Stade Tata Raphaël, Kinshasa
Referee: Aurélien Juenkou Wandji (Cameroon)
8 March 2015
15:30 UTC+2

Burundi	1–1	DR Congo
Fiston 42'	Report	Ipumbu 36'

Prince Louis Rwagasore Stadium, Bujumbura
Referee: Zekarias Girma Fega (Ethiopia)

Burundi won 2–1 on aggregate.

1 March 2015
18:00 UTC+2

Egypt	3–0	Kenya
Rabia 45'; Kahraba 88', 90+4' (pen.)	Report

Petro Sport Stadium, Cairo
Referee: Mokhtar Amalou (Algeria)
8 March 2015
15:00 UTC+3

Kenya	1–1	Egypt
Omumbo 22' (pen.)	Report	Kahraba 16' (pen.)

Kenyatta Stadium, Machakos
Referee: Wisdom Chewe (Zambia)

Egypt won 4–1 on aggregate.

21 February 2015
15:30 UTC+1

Gabon	1–4	Nigeria
Méyé 53'	Report	Ajayi 2', 47'; Oghenekaro 45+1' (pen.); Onyekachi 90'

Stade Augustin Monédan de Sibang, Libreville
Referee: Denis Dembele (Ivory Coast)
7 March 2015
16:00 UTC+1

Nigeria	2–0	Gabon
Oduduwa 67'; Ajayi 87'	Report

Abuja National Stadium, Abuja
Referee: Jean Ouattara (Burkina Faso)

Nigeria won 6–1 on aggregate.

20 February 2015

Zambia	Cancelled	Madagascar
	Report

6 March 2015

Madagascar	Cancelled	Zambia
	Report

Zambia won on walkover.

20 February 2015

Mali	Cancelled	Tunisia
	Report

6 March 2015

Tunisia	Cancelled	Mali
	Report

Mali won on walkover.

21 February 2015
15:30 UTC+2

Mozambique	0–0	Uganda
	Report

Estádio do Maxaquene, Maputo
Referee: Dennis Nguluwe (Malawi)
7 March 2015
16:00 UTC+3

Uganda	0–0	Mozambique
	Report
Penalties
	1–4

Nakivubo Stadium, Kampala
Referee: Jean Claude Kinamvuidi Fuengi (DR Congo)

0–0 on aggregate. Mozambique won on penalties.

20 February 2015

Swaziland	Cancelled	Zimbabwe
	Report

6 March 2015

Zimbabwe	Cancelled	Swaziland
	Report

Zimbabwe won on walkover.

22 February 2015
16:00 UTC+3

Ethiopia	1–2	Sudan
Hotessa 89' (pen.)	Report	Osman 26'; Gaafar 38'

Dire Dawa Stadium, Dire Dawa
Referee: Sylvester Kirwa (Kenya)
6 March 2015
16:45 UTC+3

Sudan	2–0	Ethiopia
Mukhtar 3'; Osman 56'	Report

El Obeid Stadium, Al-Ubayyid
Referee: Hudu Munyemana (Rwanda)

Sudan won 4–1 on aggregate.

=== Second round ===
Winners qualified for 2015 African Games.

Team 1	Agg.	Team 2	1st leg	2nd leg
Burkina Faso	2–1	Ivory Coast	2–1	0–0
Burundi	0–4	Egypt	0–2	0–2
Nigeria	2–1	Zambia	0–0	2–1
Mali	3–3 (a)	Senegal	2–2	1–1
Mozambique	1–2	Ghana	1–0	0–2
Zimbabwe	2–1	Cameroon	1–0	1–1
Sudan	2–1	South Africa	2–0	0–1

22 March 2015
16:00 UTC±0

Burkina Faso	2–1	Ivory Coast
Ouédraogo 54'; Sango 88'	Report	Kouadio 45+2'

Stade du 4 Août, Ouagadougou
Referee: Ousmane Sidibe (Mali)
11 April 2015
15:30 UTC±0

Ivory Coast	0–0	Burkina Faso
	Report

Stade Robert Champroux, Abidjan
Referee: El Fatih Wadeed Khaleel (Sudan)

Burkina Faso won 2–1 on aggregate.

21 March 2015
15:30 UTC+2

Burundi	0–2	Egypt
	Report	Trezeguet 5'; Fathi 45'

Prince Louis Rwagasore Stadium, Bujumbura
Referee: Hassan Mohamed Hagi (Somalia)
12 April 2015
18:00 UTC+2

Egypt	2–0	Burundi
Kahraba 21'; Salem 62'	Report

Suez Stadium, Suez
Referee: Hicham Tiazi (Morocco)

Egypt won 4–0 on aggregate.

22 March 2015
16:00 UTC+1

Nigeria	0–0	Zambia
	Report

Abuja National Stadium, Abuja
Referee: Med Said Kordi (Tunisia)
12 April 2015
15:00 UTC+2

Zambia	1–2	Nigeria
Samu 76'	Report	Awoniyi 35', 87'

National Heroes Stadium, Lusaka
Referee: Mohamed Hamada (Mauritania)

Nigeria won 2–1 on aggregate.

22 March 2015
17:00 UTC±0

Mali	2–2	Senegal
Sylla 6'; A. Traoré 68'	Report	Diaw 15'; Thiouné 75'

Stade Modibo Kéïta, Bamako
Referee: Daudu Williams (Sierra Leone)
12 April 2015
16:30 UTC±0

Senegal	1–1	Mali
Koné 54'	Report	S. Traoré 15'

Stade Caroline Faye, M'Bour
Referee: Idriss Biani (Chad)

3–3 on aggregate. Senegal won on away goals.

21 March 2015
15:30 UTC+2

Mozambique	1–0	Ghana
Salomão 85'	Report

Campo do Grupo Afrin, Maputo
Referee: Osiase William Koto (Lesotho)
12 April 2015
14:30 UTC±0

Ghana	2–0	Mozambique
Salomão 73' (o.g.); Adjei 83'	Report

Tamale Stadium, Tamale
Referee: Juste Ephrem Zio (Burkina Faso)

Ghana won 2–1 on aggregate.

22 March 2015
15:00 UTC+2

Zimbabwe	1–0	Cameroon
Mutasa 21'	Report

Rufaro Stadium, Harare
Referee: Tinyiko Victor Hlungwani (South Africa)
12 April 2015
15:30 UTC+1

Cameroon	1–1	Zimbabwe
Tchamabo 45'	Report	Moyo 57' (pen.)

Stade Ahmadou Ahidjo, Yaoundé
Referee: Daouda Gueye (Senegal)

Zimbabwe won 2–1 on aggregate.

22 March 2015
16:45 UTC+3

Sudan	2–0	South Africa
Osman 21'; El Tahir 69'	Report

El Obeid Stadium, Al-Ubayyid
Referee: Bruno Andriamiharisoa (Madagascar)
11 April 2015
16:05 UTC+2

South Africa	1–0	Sudan
Masuku 83'	Report

Dobsonville Stadium, Johannesburg
Referee: Allister Barra (Seychelles)

Sudan won 2–1 on aggregate.

== Qualified teams ==
The following eight teams qualified for the final tournament.

Team	Qualified on	Previous appearances in tournament^{1}
Congo (hosts)	14 September 2011	3 (**1965**, 1973, 1995)
Burkina Faso	11 April 2015	1 (1973)
Egypt	12 April 2015	7 (1973, 1978, **1987**, 1991, **1995**, 2003, 2007)
Nigeria	12 April 2015	5 (**1973**, 1978, 1991, 1995, 2003)
Senegal	12 April 2015	3 (1987, 2003, 2011)
Ghana	12 April 2015	5 (1973, 1978, 2003, 2007, **2011**)
Zimbabwe	12 April 2015	2 (1991, 1995)
Sudan	11 April 2015	0 (debut)

^{1} Bold indicates champion for that year. Italic indicates host for that year.

On 26 August 2015, the CAF announced that Egypt had withdrawn from the competition. Burundi, the team eliminated by Egypt in the final round, declined to replace them due to short notice. Therefore, only seven teams competed in the final tournament.

== Goalscorers ==
4 goals

- (Egypt) Kahraba

3 goals

- (Nigeria) Junior Ajayi
- (Sudan) Maher Osman

2 goals

- (Nigeria) Taiwo Awoniyi

1 goal

- (Burkina Faso) Faïçal Ouédraogo
- (Burkina Faso) Allassane Sango
- (Burundi) Abbas Nshimirimana
- (Burundi) Fiston Abdul Razak
- (Cameroon) Brice Tchamabo
- (Democratic Republic of the Congo) Katalay Ipumbu
- (Egypt) Mostafa Fathi
- (Egypt) Ramy Rabia
- (Egypt) Mohamed Salem
- (Egypt) Trezeguet
- (Ethiopia) Dawa Hotessa
- (Gabon) Axel Méyé
- (Ghana) Bright Adjei
- (Ivory Coast) Cédric Khaleb Kouadio
- (Kenya) Vincent Omumbo
- (Mali) Alou Badra Sylla
- (Mali) Abdramane Traoré
- (Mali) Sidi Yaya Traoré
- (Mozambique) Salomão
- (Nigeria) Segun Oduduwa
- (Nigeria) Etebo Oghenekaro
- (Nigeria) Peter Onyekachi
- (Senegal) Elhadji Pape Diaw
- (Senegal) Moussa Koné
- (Senegal) Ousseynou Thiouné
- (South Africa) Menzi Masuku
- (Sudan) Athar El Tahir
- (Sudan) Ibrahim Gaafar
- (Sudan) Mohamed Mukhtar
- (Zambia) Friday Samu
- (Zimbabwe) Blessing Moyo
- (Zimbabwe) Wisdom Mutasa

Own goal

- (Mozambique) Salomão (playing against Ghana)

== See also ==
- Football at the 2015 African Games – Women's qualification
