= 2023 COSAFA Women's Championship =

Association football championship

Tournament details
- Host country: South Africa
- Dates: 4–15 October
- Teams: 12 (from 1 sub-confederation)
- Venues: 3 (in 2 host cities)

Final positions
- Champions: Malawi (1st title)
- Runners-up: Zambia
- Third place: Mozambique
- Fourth place: Zimbabwe

Tournament statistics
- Matches played: 22
- Goals scored: 70 (3.18 per match)
- Top scorer(s): (Malawi) Temwa Chawinga (9 goals)
- Best player: (Malawi) Temwa Chawinga
- Best goalkeeper: (Zimbabwe) Cynthia Shonga
- Fair play award: Zambia

The 2023 COSAFA Women's Championship was the eleventh edition of the COSAFA Women's Championship, also known as the 2023 Hollywoodbets COSAFA Women's Championship for sponsorship purposes, the annual international women's association football championship contested by women's national teams of Southern Africa and organised by COSAFA. The tournament took place from 4 to 15 October 2023 in South Africa.

The opening match was won by Eswatini, beating Madagascar at Lucas Moripe Stadium in Pretoria and achieving their first COSAFA Women's Championship victory since 2020.

Malawi were crowned champions after defeating holders Zambia 2–1 in the final. It was the first time Malawi had won a COSAFA Women's tournament, securing their first major title. Mozambique claimed their first medal at the COSAFA Women's Championship, finishing third. Malawian player Temwa Chawinga achieved a remarkable double, clinching the Golden Boot with nine goals during the tournament and also claiming the Golden Ball award. Zimbabwe goalkeeper Cynthia Shongwe won the Golden Glove, awarded to the best-performing goalkeeper of the tournament.

Of the twelve teams taking part, Zimbabwe and Madagascar returned to the competition after missing last year's edition. 2011 winners Zimbabwe advanced to the semi-finals for the first time since 2019. Host and seven-time champion South Africa were eliminated in the group stage after they failed to beat Malawi, the first time the team failed to reach the semi-finals of the tournament.

== Format ==
In September 2023, during the draw ceremony, the competition format was revealed. The tournament commenced with a group stage comprising three groups, each consisting of four teams. The group winners, along with the highest-ranked second-placed team, advanced to the knockout stage. The winners of each semi-final proceeded to the final, while the losing teams faced off in a third-place match to determine the bronze medalist.

== Venues ==
COSAFA selected three venues within the province of Gauteng, in two cities: one stadium in Pretoria, and two stadiums in Johannesburg.

Lucas Moripe Stadium in Pretoria hosted the opening match between South Africa and Malawi. The same stadium also hosted the third-place match and the final on 15 October.

Pretoria	Johannesburg		2023 COSAFA Women's Championship is located in South Africa
Lucas Moripe Stadium	Dobsonville Stadium	UJ Stadium	2023 COSAFA Women's Championship is located in South Africa
Capacity: 28,900	Capacity: 24,000	Capacity: 8,000	2023 COSAFA Women's Championship is located in South Africa

== Teams ==
=== Participation ===
Twelve member associations of COSAFA confirmed their participation in this year's edition. Out of the twelve participants, ten countries competed at the previous tournament in 2022. Zimbabwe made a comeback after being absent from last year's edition, while Madagascar, whose team had been inactive since 2019, also returned to the international stage.

Note: All appearance statistics exclude the 2008 edition.

Team	App	Last appearance	Previous best performance
Angola	6th	2022	Runner-up (2008)
Botswana	9th	2022	Runners-up (2020)
Comoros	4th	2022	Group stage (2019, 2020, 2022)
Eswatini	9th	2022	Group stage (2002, 2006, 2017, 2018, 2019, 2020, 2021, 2022)
Lesotho	8th	2022	Group stage (2002, 2006, 2011, 2017, 2018, 2020, 2022)
Madagascar	4th	2019	Group stage (2017, 2018, 2019)
Malawi	10th	2022	Runners-up (2021)
Mozambique	9th	2022	Fourth place (2002)
Namibia	7th	2022	Runners-up (2006)
South Africa	10th	2022	Champions (2002, 2006, 2017, 2018, 2019, 2020)
Zambia	10th	2022	Champions (2022)
Zimbabwe	9th	2021	Champions (2011)

Did not enter

- Mauritius
- Seychelles

=== Draw ===
The final draw took place at the COSAFA Headquarters in Johannesburg, South Africa, on 14 September 2023 at 11:00 SAST (UTC+2).

In this edition, three teams were seeded based on their performance in the 2022 COSAFA Women's Championship: Zambia (the 2022 champions, assigned to B1), South Africa (the 2022 runners-up, assigned to A1), and Namibia (the 2022 fourth-place team, assigned to C1). Additionally, two pots were formed for the draw. Pot 1 included the next highest-ranked teams, namely Botswana, Malawi, and Mozambique, while Pot 2 comprised the six remaining lowest-ranked teams, which were Angola, Comoros, Eswatini, Lesotho, Madagascar, and Zimbabwe.

Pot 1	Pot 2
Botswana; Malawi; Mozambique	Angola; Comoros; Eswatini; Lesotho; Madagascar; Zimbabwe

== Officials ==
For the first time in tournament history, Video assistant referees (VAR) were used from the semi-finals onwards.

Referees

- (Botswana) Seonyatseng Tshephe
- (Eswatini) Letticia Viana
- (Lesotho) Nteboheleng Setoko
- (Madagascar) Rosa Hanjavola
- (Madagascar) Rosalie Rosalie
- (Malawi) Eness Gumbo
- (Malawi) Mercy Kayira
- (Mauritius) Maria Rivet
- (Namibia) Antsino Twanyanyukwa
- (Namibia) Vistoria Shangula
- (Rwanda) Salima Mukansanga
- (South Africa) Akhona Makalima
- (Zambia) Gloria Sambumba
- (Zimbabwe) Grace Gimo

Assistant Referees

- (Botswana) Leungo Tsogang
- (Kenya) Mary Njoroge
- (Madagascar) Lidwine Rakotozafinord
- (Madagascar) Herilalaina Razafitsalama
- (Malawi) Bernadettar Kwimbira
- (Mauritius) Windy Rambhoro
- (Mozambique) Olinda Couana
- (Namibia) Eveline Augustinus
- (South Africa) Nandipha Menze
- (Zambia) Diana Chikotesha
- (Zambia) Mercy Zulu
- (Zimbabwe) Claris Simango

Video assistant referees

- (Mauritius) Ahmad Heeralall
- (Angola) Emiliano dos Santos

== Group stage ==
All times are local, SAST (UTC+2).

Tie-breaking criteria for group play
The ranking of teams in the group stage was determined as follows:
1. Points obtained in the matches played between the teams in question (three points for a win, one for a draw, none for a defeat);
2. Goal difference in the matches played between the teams in question;
3. Number of goals scored in the matches played between the teams in question;
4. Goal difference in all group matches;
5. Fair play points in all group matches (only one deduction could be applied to a player in a single match):
  - Yellow card: −1 point;
  - Indirect red card (second yellow card): −3 points;
  - Direct red card: −4 points;
  - Yellow card and direct red card: −5 points;
6. Drawing of lots.

=== Group A ===
Pos	Team	Pld	W	D	L	GF	GA	GD	Pts	Qualification
1	Malawi	3	3	0	0	15	4	+11	9	Qualified for knockout stage
2	South Africa (H)	3	2	0	1	9	5	+4	6	
3	Eswatini	3	1	0	2	2	12	−10	3	
4	Madagascar	3	0	0	3	3	8	−5	0	

Source: COSAFA
Rules for classification: 1) points; 2) head-to-head points; 3) head-to-head goal difference; 4) goal difference; 5) number of goals scored; 6) drawing of lots
(H) Hosts
4 October
12:00

Madagascar	1–2	Eswatini
Raharimalala 28'	Report	Ngcamphalala 46'; Magagula 81'

Lucas Moripe Stadium, Pretoria
Referee: Maria Rivet (Mauritius)
4 October
15:30

South Africa	3–4	Malawi
T. Shamase 44'; Nkuna 79'; S. Shamase 90+3'	Report	Chinyamula 27'; Te. Chawinga 45+5', 64', 76'

Lucas Moripe Stadium, Pretoria
Referee: Antsino Twanyanyukwa (Namibia)

7 October
12:00

Malawi	8–0	Eswatini
Thom 6', 33'; Mathyola 45'; Kadzere 52'; Te. Chawinga 55', 63', 75', 76'	Report

Dobsonville Stadium, Johannesburg
Referee: Grace Gimo (Zimbabwe)
7 October
15:00

South Africa	3–1	Madagascar
T. Shamase 14' (pen.); Selana 65', 78'	Report	Velomanantsolo 43'

Dobsonville Stadium, Johannesburg
Referee: Vistoria Shangula (Namibia)

10 October
15:30

Madagascar	1–3	Malawi
Randrianarivelo 33' (pen.)	Report	Chikupila 23'; Chinyamula 25'; Simwaka 35'

UJ Stadium, Johannesburg
Referee: Antsino Twanyanyukwa (Namibia)
10 October
15:30

South Africa	3–0	Eswatini
T. Shamase 6', 12', 55'	Report

Dobsonville Stadium, Johannesburg
Referee: Rosalie Rosalie (Madagascar)

=== Group B ===
Pos	Team	Pld	W	D	L	GF	GA	GD	Pts	Qualification
1	Zambia	3	2	1	0	8	2	+6	7	Qualified for knockout stage
2	Mozambique	3	2	1	0	4	1	+3	7	Qualified for knockout stage
3	Angola	3	1	0	2	6	4	+2	3	
4	Comoros	3	0	0	3	2	13	−11	0	

Source: COSAFA
Rules for classification: 1) points; 2) head-to-head points; 3) head-to-head goal difference; 4) goal difference; 5) number of goals scored; 6) drawing of lots
5 October
12:00

Angola	5–0	Comoros
Caupe 4'; Luvunga 21'; Matuvova 24'; Nyoca Nsumbo 31'; S. Ali 45+3' (o.g.)	Report

Lucas Moripe Stadium, Pretoria
Referee: Akhona Makalima (South Africa)
5 October
15:30

Zambia	0–0	Mozambique
	Report

Lucas Moripe Stadium, Pretoria
Referee: Eness Gumbo (Malawi)

8 October
12:00

Zambia	3–1	Angola
Jere 3', 85'; Nkole 20'	Report	Luvunga 90+1'

Dobsonville Stadium, Johannesburg
Referee: Nteboheleng Setoko (Lesotho)
8 October
15:30

Mozambique	3–1	Comoros
Gove 18', 51' (pen.); Saene 86'	Report	Hadhirami Ali 4'

Dobsonville Stadium, Johannesburg
Referee: Rosalie Rosalie (Madagascar)

10 October
12:00

Zambia	5–1	Comoros
Kabwe 20', 59', 75'; Mweemba 60'; Jere 87' (pen.)	Report	Mohamed Ahamadi 42'

UJ Stadium, Johannesburg
Referee: Rosa Hanjavola (Madagascar)
10 October
12:00

Angola	0–1	Mozambique
	Report	Banze 73' (pen.)

Dobsonville Stadium, Johannesburg
Referee: Nteboheleng Setoko (Lesotho)

=== Group C ===
Pos	Team	Pld	W	D	L	GF	GA	GD	Pts	Qualification
1	Zimbabwe	3	2	1	0	4	1	+3	7	Qualified for knockout stage
2	Botswana	3	1	2	0	5	2	+3	5	
3	Namibia	3	1	1	1	3	3	0	4	
4	Lesotho	3	0	0	3	0	6	−6	0	

Source: COSAFA
Rules for classification: 1) points; 2) head-to-head points; 3) head-to-head goal difference; 4) goal difference; 5) number of goals scored; 6) drawing of lots
6 October
12:00

Zimbabwe	1–0	Lesotho
Mupeti 58'	Report

Lucas Moripe Stadium, Pretoria
Referee: Seonyatseng Tshephe (Botswana)
6 October
15:30

Namibia	1–1	Botswana
Hikuam 6'	Report	Mochawe 79'

Lucas Moripe Stadium, Pretoria
Referee: Gloria Sambumba (Zambia)

9 October
12:00

Botswana	3–0	Lesotho
Gaofetoge 6'; Johannes 35'; Mochawe 73'	Report

Dobsonville Stadium, Johannesburg
Referee: Akhona Makalima (South Africa)
9 October
15:30

Namibia	0–2	Zimbabwe
	Report	Neshamba 18'; Ncube 57'

Dobsonville Stadium, Johannesburg
Referee: Letticia Viana (Eswatini)

11 October
15:30

Zimbabwe	1–1	Botswana
Chemhere 4'	Report	Johannes 86'

Dobsonville Stadium, Johannesburg
Referee: Salima Mukansanga (Rwanda)
11 October
15:30

Namibia	2–0	Lesotho
Naris 35'; Kooper 74'	Report

UJ Stadium, Johannesburg
Referee: Maria Rivet (Mauritius)

=== Ranking of runner-up teams ===
Pos	Grp	Team	Pld	W	D	L	GF	GA	GD	Pts	Qualification
1	B	Mozambique	3	2	1	0	4	1	+3	7	Advance to knockout stage
2	A	South Africa	3	2	0	1	9	5	+4	6	
3	C	Botswana	3	1	2	0	5	2	+3	5	

Source: COSAFA

== Knockout stage ==
- In the knockout stage, extra time and a penalty shoot-out were used to decide the winner if necessary.

=== Bracket ===
Semi-finals
13 October – Pretoria
Zambia	1
Zimbabwe	0
13 October – Pretoria
Malawi	2
Mozambique	1

Final
15 October – Pretoria
Zambia	1
Malawi	2
Third place match
15 October – Pretoria
Zimbabwe	0
Mozambique	2

=== Semi-finals ===
13 October 2023
12:00

Zambia	1–0	Zimbabwe
Jere 50'	Report

Lucas Moripe Stadium, Pretoria
Referee: Akhona Makalima (South Africa)
13 October 2023
15:30

Malawi	2–1	Mozambique
Te. Chawinga 77', 80'	Report	Mkandawawire 38' (o.g.)

Lucas Moripe Stadium, Pretoria
Referee: Salima Mukansanga (Rwanda)

=== Third-place match ===
15 October 2023
12:00

Zimbabwe	0–2	Mozambique
	Report	Moçambique 87'; Manuel 90+6'

Lucas Moripe Stadium, Pretoria
Referee: Maria Rivet (Mauritius)

=== Final ===
15 October 2023
15:30

Zambia	1–2	Malawi
A. Phiri 84'	Report	Simwaka 34'; Thom 90+1'

Lucas Moripe Stadium, Pretoria
Referee: Antsino Twanyanyukwa (Namibia)

== Awards ==
The following awards were given at the conclusion of the tournament: the Golden Boot (top scorer), Golden Ball (best overall player) and Golden Glove (best goalkeeper).

Golden Boot
(Malawi) Temwa Chawinga
9 goals
Golden Ball
(Malawi) Temwa Chawinga
Golden Glove
(Zimbabwe) Cynthia Shongwe
COSAFA Fair Play Trophy
Zambia

== Statistics ==
=== Goalscorers ===
There were 70 goals scored in 22 matches, for an average of 3.18 goals per match.

9 goals

- (Malawi) Temwa Chawinga

5 goals

- (South Africa) Thubelihle Shamase

4 goals

- (Zambia) Sarah Jere

3 goals

- (Malawi) Sabinah Thom
- (Zambia) Fridah Kabwe

2 goals

- (Angola) Sara Luvunga
- (Botswana) Balothanyi Johannes
- (Botswana) Kesegofetse Mochawe
- (Malawi) Leticia Chinyamula
- (Malawi) Asimenye Simwaka
- (Mozambique) Deolinda Gove
- (South Africa) Samkelisiwe Selana

1 goal

- (Angola) Zeferina Caupe
- (Angola) Matondo Matuvova
- (Angola) Paulina Nyoca Nsumbo
- (Botswana) Lone Gaofetoge
- (Comoros) Anllaouia Hadhirami Ali
- (Comoros) Roukiat Mohamed Ahamadi
- (Eswatini) Sikhanyiso Magagula
- (Eswatini) Tenanile Ngcamphalala
- (Madagascar) Veronique Raharimalala
- (Madagascar) Heliosa Randrianarivelo
- (Madagascar) Anajrasoa Velomanantsolo
- (Malawi) Vanessa Chikupila
- (Malawi) Rose Kadzere
- (Malawi) Carolyn Mathyola
- (Mozambique) Amélia Banze
- (Mozambique) Cina Manuel
- (Mozambique) Lúcia Moçambique
- (Mozambique) Emília Saene
- (Namibia) Millicent Hikuam
- (Namibia) Ivone Kooper
- (Namibia) Emma Naris
- (South Africa) Khesani Nkuna
- (South Africa) Sphumelele Shamase
- (Zambia) Lushomo Mweemba
- (Zambia) Jacqueline Nkole
- (Zambia) Agness Phiri
- (Zimbabwe) Ennety Chemhere
- (Zimbabwe) Priviledge Mupeti
- (Zimbabwe) Nobukhosi Ncube
- (Zimbabwe) Rudo Neshamba

1 own goal

- (Comoros) Samra Ali (against Angola)
- (Malawi) Bernadetta Mkandawawire (against Mozambique)

=== Discipline ===
A player was automatically suspended for the next match for the following offences:

- Receiving a red card (red card suspensions could be extended for serious offences)
- Receiving two yellow cards in two matches; yellow cards expired after the completion of the group stage (yellow card suspensions were not carried forward to any other future international matches)

The following suspensions were served during the tournament:

Player	Offence(s)	Suspension
(Zimbabwe) Vimbai Mharadzi	(yellow card) in Group C vs Lesotho (matchday 1; 6 October); (yellow card) in Group C vs Namibia (matchday 2; 9 October)	Group C vs Botswana (matchday 3; 12 October)

== Final ranking ==
Pos	Team	Pld	W	D	L	GF	GA	GD	Pts	Final result
1	Malawi	5	5	0	0	19	6	+13	15	Champions
2	Zambia	5	3	1	1	10	4	+6	10	Runners-up
3	Mozambique	5	3	1	1	7	3	+4	10	Third place
4	Zimbabwe	5	2	1	2	4	4	0	7	Fourth place
5	South Africa	3	2	0	1	9	5	+4	6	Eliminated in group stage
6	Botswana	3	1	2	0	5	2	+3	5	Eliminated in group stage
7	Namibia	3	1	1	1	3	3	0	4	Eliminated in group stage
8	Angola	3	1	0	2	6	4	+2	3	Eliminated in group stage
9	Eswatini	3	1	0	2	2	12	−10	3	Eliminated in group stage
10	Madagascar	3	0	0	3	3	8	−5	0	Eliminated in group stage
11	Lesotho	3	0	0	3	0	6	−6	0	Eliminated in group stage
12	Comoros	3	0	0	3	2	13	−11	0	Eliminated in group stage

Source: COSAFA
