= Football at the 2015 African Games – Women's qualification =

2015 African Games women's football tournament qualification
Tournament details
- Dates: 22 February – 12 April
- Teams: 17 (from 1 confederation)

Tournament statistics
- Matches played: 14
- Goals scored: 48 (3.43 per match)
- Top scorer: (Tanzania) Asha Rashid (3 goals)

The 2015 African Games women's football tournament qualification decided the participating teams of the 2015 African Games women's football tournament. A total of eight teams qualified to play in the women's football tournament, including Congo who qualified automatically as hosts. Both the qualifying rounds and the final tournament were open to full women's national teams (unlike the men's tournament, which was age-restricted).

== Teams ==
A total of 17 teams entered the qualifying rounds, organized by the Confederation of African Football (CAF).

Round	Teams entering round	No. of teams
First round	Botswana; Gabon; Guinea-Bissau; Libya; Madagascar; Mali	6
Second round	Cameroon; Egypt; Ethiopia; Ghana; Ivory Coast; Nigeria; South Africa; Senegal; Tanzania; Zambia; Zimbabwe	11
Qualifying rounds	Total	17
Final tournament	Congo (hosts)	1

Did not enter
- Algeria
- Angola
- Benin
- Burkina Faso
- Burundi
- Cape Verde
- Central African Republic
- Chad
- Comoros
- Djibouti
- DR Congo
- Equatorial Guinea
- Eritrea
- Gambia
- Guinea
- Kenya
- Lesotho
- Liberia
- Malawi
- Mauritania
- Mauritius
- Morocco
- Mozambique
- Namibia
- Niger
- Rwanda
- São Tomé and Príncipe
- Seychelles
- Sierra Leone
- Somalia
- South Sudan
- Sudan
- Swaziland
- Togo
- Tunisia
- Uganda

== Format ==
Qualification ties were played on a home-and-away two-legged basis. If the aggregate score was tied after the second leg, the away goals rule would be applied, and if still level, the penalty shoot-out would be used to determine the winner (no extra time would be played).

The seven winners of the second round qualified for the final tournament.

== Schedule ==
The schedule of the qualifying rounds was as follows.

Round	Leg	Date
First round	First leg	20–22 February 2015
First round	Second leg	6–8 March 2015
Second round	First leg	20–22 March 2015
Second round	Second leg	10–12 April 2015

== Qualification rounds ==
=== First round ===
Team 1	Agg.	Team 2	1st leg	2nd leg
Mali	w/o	Gabon	—	—
Madagascar	2–3	Botswana	1–3	1–0
Libya	w/o	Guinea-Bissau	—	—

Note: Madagascar played their first FIFA sanctioned international match. Gabon and Libya withdrew. Gabon were not approved to travel by the Ministry of Youth and Sports.

21 February 2015
16:30 UTC±0

Mali	Cancelled	Gabon
	Report

Stade Modibo Kéïta, Bamako
6 March 2015

Gabon	Cancelled	Mali
	Report

Mali won on walkover.

22 February 2015
14:30 UTC+3

Madagascar	1–3	Botswana
Mamiseheno 26'	Report	Ramafifi 12'; Moahi 33'; Bosa 55'

Mahamasina Municipal Stadium, Antananarivo
Referee: Maria Rivet (Mauritius)
6 March 2015
18:00 UTC+2

Botswana	0–1	Madagascar
	Report	Raharimalala 22'

Botswana National Stadium, Gaborone
Referee: Thérèse Sylvie Abou'ou (Cameroon)

Botswana won 3–2 on aggregate.

20 February 2015

Libya	Cancelled	Guinea-Bissau
	Report

6 March 2015

Guinea-Bissau	Cancelled	Libya
	Report

Guinea-Bissau won on walkover.

=== Second round ===
Winners qualified for 2015 African Games.

Team 1	Agg.	Team 2	1st leg	2nd leg
Mali	1–9	Nigeria	1–1	0–8
Botswana	0–6	South Africa	0–1	0–5
Ghana	4–3	Zimbabwe	2–1	2–2
Zambia	5–6	Tanzania	2–4	3–2
Ethiopia	2–4	Cameroon	1–2	1–2
Guinea-Bissau	w/o	Ivory Coast	—	—
Egypt	2–1	Senegal	0–0	2–1

Note: Guinea-Bissau withdrew.

21 March 2015
17:00 UTC±0

Mali	1–1	Nigeria
Tangara 83'	Report	Okobi 52'

Stade Modibo Kéïta, Bamako
Referee: Fatou Thioune (Senegal)
10 April 2015
16:00 UTC+1

Nigeria	8–0	Mali
Oparanozie 3', 45+2'; Ordega 19', 62'; Oshoala 36', 47'; Nwabuoku 69'; Sunday 71'	Report

Abuja National Stadium, Abuja
Referee: Joyce Obenewa Appiah (Ghana)

Nigeria won 9–1 on aggregate.

21 March 2015
15:00 UTC+2

Botswana	0–1	South Africa
	Report	Mollo 28'

Molepolole Stadium, Molepolole
Referee: Rusina Kuda Majo (Zimbabwe)
11 April 2015
14:00 UTC+2

South Africa	5–0	Botswana
Makhabane 8' (pen.); Modise 14'; Dlamini 52'; Matlou 59'; Ngubane 67'	Report

Dobsonville Stadium, Johannesburg
Referee: Gladys Lengwe (Zambia)

South Africa won 6–0 on aggregate.

21 March 2015
15:00 UTC±0

Ghana	2–1	Zimbabwe
Aduako 28' (pen.); Suleman 50'	Report	Mbipa 68'

Accra Sports Stadium, Accra
Referee: Therese Aimee Nteme Zoa (Cameroon)
12 April 2015
15:00 UTC+2

Zimbabwe	2–2	Ghana
Zulu 40'; Neshamba 75'	Report	Boakye 20'; Addo 74'

Rufaro Stadium, Harare
Referee: Grace Natasha Msiska (Malawi)

Ghana won 4–3 on aggregate.

22 March 2015
15:00 UTC+2

Zambia	2–4	Tanzania
Zulu 44'; Chanda 69'	Report	Rashid 50', 77'; Boniface 59'; Mwasikili 89'

Nkoloma Stadium, Lusaka
Referee: Damaris Wangari Kimani (Kenya)
10 April 2015
16:30 UTC+3

Tanzania	2–3	Zambia
Rashid 3'; Shurua 29'	Report	Chanda 53'; Lungu 61' (pen.); Zulu 89'

National Stadium, Dar es Salaam
Referee: Anna Akoyi (Uganda)

Tanzania won 6–5 on aggregate.

21 March 2015
16:00 UTC+3

Ethiopia	1–2	Cameroon
Abera 15'	Report	Meffometou 83'; Ngono Mani 88'

Addis Ababa Stadium, Addis Ababa
Referee: Sara Mohamed Ramadan (Egypt)
11 April 2015
15:30 UTC+1

Cameroon	2–1	Ethiopia
Onguéné 41'; Ngono Mani 77'	Report	Ngo Ndom 2' (o.g.)

Stade Ahmadou Ahidjo, Yaoundé
Referee: Kankou Coulibaly (Mali)

Cameroon won 4–2 on aggregate.

20 March 2015

Guinea-Bissau	Cancelled	Ivory Coast
	Report

10 April 2015

Ivory Coast	Cancelled	Guinea-Bissau
	Report

Ivory Coast won on walkover.

21 March 2015
15:30 UTC+2

Egypt	0–0	Senegal
	Report

Petro Sport Stadium, Cairo
Referee: Zomadre Sonia Kore (Ivory Coast)
11 April 2015
16:30 UTC±0

Senegal	1–2	Egypt
Diakhate 60'	Report	Nasser 37'; Tarik 76'

Stade Caroline Faye, M'Bour
Referee: Aissata Ameyo Amegee (Togo)

Egypt won 2–1 on aggregate.

== Qualified teams ==
The following eight teams qualified for the final tournament.

Team	Qualified on	Previous appearances in tournament^{1}
Congo (hosts)	14 September 2011	0 (debut)
Nigeria	10 April 2015	2 (**2003**, **2007**)
South Africa	11 April 2015	3 (2003, 2007, 2011)
Ghana	12 April 2015	2 (2007, 2011)
Tanzania	10 April 2015	1 (2011)
Cameroon	11 April 2015	2 (2003, **2011**)
Ivory Coast	20 March 2015	0 (debut)
Egypt	11 April 2015	0 (debut)

^{1} Bold indicates champion for that year. Italic indicates host for that year.

On 26 August 2015, the CAF announced that Egypt had withdrawn from the competition. Senegal, the team eliminated by Egypt in the final round, declined to replace them due to short notice. Therefore, only seven teams competed in the final tournament.

== Goalscorers ==
3 goals

- (Tanzania) Asha Rashid

2 goals

- (Cameroon) Madeleine Ngono Mani
- (Nigeria) Desire Oparanozie
- (Nigeria) Francisca Ordega
- (Nigeria) Asisat Oshoala
- (Zambia) Grace Chanda
- (Zambia) Misozi Zulu

1 goal

- (Botswana) Phatshimo Bosa
- (Botswana) Amogelang Moahi
- (Botswana) Thuto Ramafifi
- (Cameroon) Claudine Meffometou
- (Cameroon) Gabrielle Onguéné
- (Egypt) Nada Nasser
- (Egypt) Salma Tarik
- (Ethiopia) Loza Abera
- (Ghana) Elizabeth Addo
- (Ghana) Agnes Aduako
- (Ghana) Portia Boakye
- (Ghana) Samira Suleman
- (Madagascar) Regina Mamiseheno
- (Madagascar) Marie Raharimalala
- (Mali) Awa Tangara
- (Nigeria) Evelyn Nwabuoku
- (Nigeria) Ngozi Okobi
- (Nigeria) Esther Sunday
- (Senegal) Binta Diakhaté
- (South Africa) Amanda Dlamini
- (South Africa) Mamello Makhabane
- (South Africa) Noko Matlou
- (South Africa) Portia Modise
- (South Africa) Sanah Mollo
- (South Africa) Silindile Ngubane
- (Tanzania) Shelder Boniface
- (Tanzania) Sophia Mwasikili
- (Tanzania) Mwanahamisi Shurua
- (Zambia) Ireen Lungu
- (Zimbabwe) Emmaculate Msipa
- (Zimbabwe) Rudo Neshamba
- (Zimbabwe) Samkelisiwe Zulu

Own goal

- (Cameroon) Annette Ngo Ndom (playing against Ethiopia)

== See also ==
- Football at the 2015 African Games – Men's qualification
