= Women's football in Seychelles =

- Country: Seychelles
- Governing body: Seychelles Football Federation
- National team: Women's national team
- Registered players: 185 (as of 2006)
- Clubs: 8 (as of 2009)

Women's football in Seychelles faces several development problems inside the country including a lack of popularity for the sport, and few female players and teams. Women have gained football leadership positions in the country with one coaching a men's team and another umpiring international matches. There are other development issues for the sport that are ones facing the whole of Africa.

== Background and development ==
The Seychelles Football Federation was founded in 1979, and became a FIFA affiliate in 1986. Women's football is represented in the federation by specific mandate and currently they employ one full-time employee to look after the women's game.

Football is the third most-popular women's sport in the country. In 2006, there were overall 185 registered female players (100 adult players and 85 youth players). There are also a few women's clubs, eight senior women's club as of 2009 and a national competition takes place yearly. Girls' football was not played in school based competitions in 2006, but started in 2009. The first woman's football tournament occurred in the late 1990s, with the first tournaments being seven-a-side football before an eleven-a-side tournament started. The Patron's Cup, the major women's competition in the country that is the final for the national league, was won by Olympia Coast in 2001, 2002, 2003 and 2005. The cup was won by Dolphins in 2004. The competition and some of the teams underwent a name change with United Sisters becoming the Lioness and the Patron's Cup becoming the Federation Cup. In 2007, 2009 and 2011, the Lioness won the Federation Cup. In 2002, Cynthia Sanders became the first woman from the country to attain an assistant referee international license. Rights to broadcast the 2011 Women's World Cup in the country were bought by the African Union of Broadcasting and Supersport International. In 2011, Sanders became the first woman from the country to referee an international match when she officiated a match between Malawi and Zimbabwe in Harare, Zimbabwe. In 2012, the country had their first woman sign a contract for and coach a men's team.

Early development of the women's game at the time colonial powers brought football to the African continent was limited, as colonial powers in the region tended to make concepts of patriarchy and women's participation in sports was limited as a result. The lack of later development of the national teams on a wider international level is symptomatic of most of African teams and a result of several factors, including limited access to education, poverty amongst women in the wider society, and fundamental inequality present in the society that occasionally allows for female specific human rights abuses. When quality female football players are developed, they tend to leave for greater opportunities abroad. Continent wide, funding is also an issue, with most development money coming from FIFA, not the national football association. Future success for women's football in Africa is dependent on improved facilities and access by women to these facilities. Attempting to commercialise the game and make it commercially viable is not the solution, as demonstrated by the current existence of many youth and women's football camps held throughout the continent.

== National team ==
The Seychelles played in a single FIFA sanctioned match between 1950 and June 2012.

In 2005, they competed in a three nation tournament hosted by Mauritius, where all games were 80 minutes in length. They lost to Mauritius 1–4 and also to Réunion 0–9. Overall, they finished last, scoring only one goal in the competition. In 2005, Zambia was supposed to host a regional COSAFA women's football tournament, with ten teams agreeing to send teams including South Africa, Zimbabwe, Mozambique, Malawi, Seychelles, Mauritius, Madagascar, Zambia, Botswana, Namibia, Lesotho and Swaziland. Seychelles did not record a match in the event.

In 2006, the country did not have an official FIFA-recognised senior "A" team, a situation unchanged by 2009. However, the country has an official under-17 team, the Seychelles women's national under-17 football team. In 2006, they had two training sessions a week but had yet to record an official FIFA recognised match.

The country did not have a team competing in the 2010 African Women's Championship, or at the 2011 All Africa Games. In March 2012, the team was not ranked in the world by FIFA due to inactivity.

In 2022, Seychelles have entered the FIFA/Coca-Cola Women’s World Ranking for the first time under the Singaporean head coach Angeline Chua. For a team to be ranked on the FIFA list, the team has to play a minimum of six international matches against ranked teams. On 4th April 2022, the Seychelles women's national team played its sixth international match in Singapore.

== See also ==
- Football in Seychelles
