= Prado (footballer, born 1999) =

Angolan footballer (born 1999)

Personal information
- Full name: Sara Bilumbu Luvunga
- Date of birth: 12 September 1999 (age 27)
- Position: Midfielder

Team information
- Current team: TP Mazembe
- Number: 17

Senior career*
Years	Team	Apps	(Gls)
- Progresso do Sambizanga
- 1º de Agosto
- TP Mazembe

International career^{‡}
2020–	Angola	10	(4)
- * Club domestic league appearances and goals ‡ National team caps and goals as of 24 July 2026.

Sara Bilumbu Luvunga (born 12 September 1999), known as Prado, is an Angolan footballer who plays as a midfielder for LINAFF club TP Mazembe and the Angola national team.

== Club career ==
Prado has played for Progresso Associação do Sambizanga and 1º de Agosto in Angola.

== International career ==
Prado capped for Angola at senior level during five COSAFA Women's Championship editions (2020, 2021, 2022, 2023 and 2025)

International goals

No	Date	Venue	Opponent	Score	Result	Competition
1	6 September 2022	Madibaz Stadium, Gqeberha, South Africa	Mauritius	1-0	2-0	2022 COSAFA Women's Championship
2	6 September 2022	Madibaz Stadium, Gqeberha, South Africa	Mauritius	2-0	2-0	2022 COSAFA Women's Championship
3	5 October 2023	Lucas Moripe Stadium, Pretoria, South Africa	Comoros	2-0	5-0	2023 COSAFA Women's Championship
4	8 October 2023	Dobsonville Stadium, Johannesburg, South Africa	Zambia	1-3	1–3	2023 COSAFA Women's Championship

== Honours ==
TP Mazembe

- CAF Women's Champions League: 2024
