= 2017 COSAFA Women's Championship =

Tournament details
- Host country: Zimbabwe
- Dates: 13 – 24 September 2017
- Teams: 12 (from 1 confederation)
- Venue: 2 (in 1 host city)

Final positions
- Champions: South Africa (4th title)
- Runners-up: Zimbabwe
- Third place: Zambia
- Fourth place: Kenya

Tournament statistics
- Matches played: 22
- Goals scored: 101 (4.59 per match)
- Top scorer(s): (Zimbabwe) Rutendo Makore (10 goals)
- Best player: (South Africa) Thembi Kgatlana
- Best goalkeeper: (Zimbabwe) Chido Dzingirai
- Fair play award: Kenya

The 2017 COSAFA Women's Championship was an international football tournament for national teams organised by COSAFA, teams from Southern Africa. The 2017 edition took place between 13 and 24 September 2017 in Bulawayo, Zimbabwe.

The tournament was won by South Africa.

== Participants ==
Twelve teams took part in the competition 11 of the 14 COSAFA members and Kenya as invited guest from East Africa.

- Botswana
- Kenya
- Lesotho
- Madagascar
- Malawi
- Mauritius
- Mozambique
- Namibia
- South Africa
- Swaziland
- Zambia
- Zimbabwe

== Venues ==
Bulawayo
Barbourfields Stadium	Luveve Stadium
Capacity: 32,000	Capacity: 8,000
20.130910410°S 28.569635152°E	20.104379867°S 28.506098985°E

== Draw ==
The draw took place on 23 August 2017 at 2pm.

== Group stage ==
- All times are Central Africa Time (UTC+2).

=== Group A ===
Pos	Team	Pld	W	D	L	GF	GA	GD	Pts	Qualification
1	Zambia	3	2	1	0	14	5	+9	7	Advance to knockout stage
2	Zimbabwe (H)	3	1	2	0	8	4	+4	5 (Note: Zimbabwe advanced to the semi-finals as best runners-up.)	Advance to knockout stage
3	Malawi	3	1	1	1	12	12	0	4	
4	Madagascar	3	0	0	3	4	17	−13	0	

(H) Hosts
Notes:
13 September 2017
14:00

Zambia	6–3	Malawi
Sosala 12'; M. Zulu 17', 54', 76'; Banda 23'; Nachula 90'	Report	Ta. Chawinga 9', 35', 86'

Barbourfields Stadium
13 September 2017
16:30

Zimbabwe	4–0	Madagascar
Makore 42', 48', 76', 79'	Report

Barbourfields Stadium

15 September 2017
10:30

Madagascar	3–6	Malawi
Farafaniaina 54', 69'; Razafindrabe 65'	Report	Ta. Chawinga 22', 37', 87', 90'; Te. Chawinga 45', 49'

Barbourfields Stadium
15 September 2017
14:00

Zimbabwe	1–1	Zambia
Makore 50'	Report	Banda 26'

Barbourfields Stadium

17 September 2017
14:00

Zambia	7–1	Madagascar
M. Zulu 6'; Banda 11', 22'; Chanda 50'; Sosala 68'; Chileshe 80'; Nachula 81'	Report	Farafaniaina 20'

Barbourfields Stadium
17 September 2017
14:00

Zimbabwe	3–3	Malawi
Makore 22', 31', 57'	Report	Te. Chawinga 37'; Ta. Chawinga 60', 89'

Luveve Stadium

=== Group B ===
Pos	Team	Pld	W	D	L	GF	GA	GD	Pts	Qualification
1	Kenya (G)	3	3	0	0	17	2	+15	9	Advance to knockout stage
2	Swaziland	3	1	1	1	5	3	+2	4	
3	Mozambique	3	1	1	1	7	7	0	4	
4	Mauritius	3	0	0	3	0	17	−17	0	

(G) Guests
14 September 2017
10:30

Mauritius	0–3	Swaziland
	Report	Sanga 1'; Mdluli 32'; Nkambule 86'

Luveve Stadium
14 September 2017
14:00

Kenya	5–2	Mozambique
Atieno 23', 58', 87'; Adam 84'; Owiti 90'	Report	Lúcia Leila 9', 49'

Luveve Stadium

16 September 2017
10:30

Kenya	11–0	Mauritius
Adam 9', 85'; Atieno 25', 32', 45+5', 51'; Mukhwana 34', 49'; Salano 54'; Nixon 79'; Rassoie 90+2' (o.g.)	Report

Luveve Stadium
16 September 2017
16:30

Mozambique	2–2	Swaziland
Lúcia Leila 74'; Betinha 90'	Report	Nkambule 49'; Nq. Dlamini 75'

Luveve Stadium

18 September 2017
14:00

Mauritius	0–3	Mozambique
	Report	Lúcia Leila 19'; Ninika 49'; Betinha 54'

Luveve Stadium
18 September 2017
14:00

Kenya	1–0	Swaziland
Achieng 90'	Report

Barbourfields Stadium

=== Group C ===
Pos	Team	Pld	W	D	L	GF	GA	GD	Pts	Qualification
1	South Africa	3	2	1	0	7	2	+5	7	Advance to knockout stage
2	Botswana	3	1	1	1	4	5	−1	4	
3	Lesotho	3	1	0	2	2	7	−5	3	
4	Namibia	3	1	0	2	6	5	+1	3	

13 September 2017
10:30

Namibia	4–0	Botswana
Shangula 16', 43'; Coleman 41' (pen.); Shikusho 87'	Report

Barbourfields Stadium
14 September 2017
16:30

South Africa	3–0	Lesotho
Smeda 28'; Esau 67'; Kgatlana 73'	Report

Luveve Stadium

15 September 2017
16:30

South Africa	3–1	Namibia
Kgatlana 5', 88'; Esau 13'	Report	Blou 37'

Barbourfields Stadium
16 September 2017
14:00

Lesotho	0–3	Botswana
	Report	Gammu 3'; Otlhagile 22', 26'

Luveve Stadium

17 September 2017
16:30

Namibia	1–2	Lesotho
Shikusho 4' (pen.)	Report	Rabale 22', 54'

Barbourfields Stadium
17 September 2017
16:30

South Africa	1–1	Botswana
Esau 87'	Report	Tholakele 84'

Luveve Stadium

== Knockout stage ==
=== Semi-finals ===
21 September 2017
13:00

Zambia	3–3	South Africa
Banda 21'; Chanda 45'; M. Zulu 73'	Report	Smeda 77', 78' (pen.); Jane 84'
Penalties
M. Zulu (penalty scored); G. Zulu (penalty scored); Chisamu (penalty scored); Mukwasa (penalty missed)	3–5	(penalty scored) Smeda; (penalty scored) Mbane; (penalty scored) Matlou; (penalty scored) Nyandeni; (penalty scored) Ramalepe

Barbourfields Stadium

21 September 2017
16:00

Kenya	0–4	Zimbabwe
	Report	Makore 11'; Kabwe 45'; Nyaumwe 53'; Mupeti 89'

Barbourfields Stadium

=== Bronze medal match ===
23 September 2017
13:00

Zambia	1–1	Kenya
Banda 72'	Report	Atieno 30'
Penalties
I. Lungu (penalty scored); Mulenga (penalty scored); Chisamu (penalty scored); M. Zulu (penalty scored)	4–2	(penalty scored) Nixon; (penalty missed) Mukhwana; (penalty scored) Atieno; (penalty missed) Msungu

Barbourfields Stadium

=== Final ===
24 September 2017
15:00

South Africa	2–1	Zimbabwe
Kgatlana 45+1'; Smeda 90'	Report	Makore 73'

Barbourfields Stadium

== Statistics ==
=== Goalscorers ===
There were 101 goals scored in 22 matches, for an average of 4.59 goals per match.

10 goals

- (Zimbabwe) Rutendo Makore

9 goals

- (Malawi) Tabitha Chawinga

8 goals

- (Kenya) Neddy Atieno

5 goals

- (Zambia) Misozi Zulu
- (Zambia) Barbra Banda

4 goals

- (Mozambique) Lúcia Leila
- (South Africa) Thembi Kgatlana
- (South Africa) Leandra Smeda

3 goals

- (Kenya) Mwanalima Adam
- (Madagascar) Sophie Farafaniaina
- (Malawi) Temwa Chawinga
- (South Africa) Chantelle Esau

2 goals

- (Botswana) Bonang Otlhagile
- (Kenya) Lucy Mukhwana
- (Lesotho) Boitumelo Rabale
- (Mozambique) Betinha
- (Namibia) Vistoria Shangula
- (Namibia) Anna-Marie Shikusho
- (Eswatini) Celiwe Nkambule
- (Zambia) Grace Chanda
- (Zambia) Racheal Nachula
- (Zambia) Noria Sosala

1 goal

- (Botswana) Boitumelo Gammu
- (Botswana) Refilwe Tholakele
- (Kenya) Mercy Achieng
- (Kenya) Dorcas Nixon
- (Kenya) Phoeby Owiti
- (Kenya) Cheris Salano
- (Madagascar) Mamy Razafindrabe
- (Mozambique) Ninika
- (Namibia) Juliana Blou
- (Namibia) Zenatha Coleman
- (South Africa) Refiloe Jane
- (Eswatini) Nqobile Dlamini
- (Eswatini) Nobuhle Mdluli
- (Eswatini) Nomvula Sanga
- (Zambia) Rhoda Chileshe
- (Zimbabwe) Berita Kabwe
- (Zimbabwe) Priviledge Mupeti
- (Zimbabwe) Marjory Nyaumwe

1 own goal

- (Mauritius) Marie Rassoie (against Kenya)

=== Awards ===
Player of the Tournament was South Africa's Chrestinah Kgatlana. Golden Boot winner was Zimbabwe's Rutendo Makore with 10 goals. Zimbabwe goalkeeper Chido Dzingirai won the Golden Glove award The Fair Play award was given to Kenya.
