= Agnes Aduako =

Ghanaian footballer

Personal information
- Date of birth: 25 December 1989 (age 36)
- Position: Forward

Senior career*
Years	Team	Apps	(Gls)
- Fabulous Ladies

International career^{‡}
- Ghana
- * Club domestic league appearances and goals ‡ National team caps and goals as of 11 october 2014 (before the 2014 African Women's Championship)

Agnes Aduako (born 25 December 1989) is a Ghanaian footballer who plays as a forward for the Ghana women's national football team. She was part of the team at the 2014 African Women's Championship and at the 2015 African Games scoring a goal against Zimbabwe. At the club level, she played for Fabulous Ladies in Ghana.

== International goals ==
No.	Date	Venue	Opponent	Score	Result	Competition
1.	21 March 2015	Accra Sports Stadium, Accra, Ghana	Zimbabwe	1–0	2–1	2015 African Games qualification

== See also ==
- List of Ghana women's international footballers
