= Joseph Kabwe =

Zimbabwean footballer (born 1980)

Personal information
- Full name: Joseph Kabwe
- Date of birth: August 8, 1980 (age 46)
- Place of birth: Bulawayo, Zimbabwe
- Height: 5 ft 9 in (1.75 m)
- Positions: Midfielder; forward

College career
Years	Team	Apps	(Gls)
2002–2003	Lindsey Wilson Blue Raiders		
2004–2005	Coastal Carolina Chanticleers		

Senior career*
Years	Team	Apps	(Gls)
2003	Des Moines Menace	19	(9)
2004–2005	Michigan Bucks	25	(6)
2006–2008	Charlotte Eagles	43	(7)
2009–2010	Carolina RailHawks	23	(6)
2010	→ Richmond Kickers (loan)	2	(0)
2012	Charlotte Eagles	18	(1)

International career
2001	Zimbabwe U-20		
2003	Zimbabwe U-23		
- * Club domestic league appearances and goals

Joseph Kabwe (born August 8, 1980, in Bulawayo) is a Zimbabwean former footballer.

== Career ==
=== College and amateur ===
Kabwe began his collegiate career at Lindsey Wilson College in the NAIA where he was a 2003 second team All American. In 2004, he transferred to Coastal Carolina University in the NCAA Division I. In 2003, he spent the collegiate off seasons with the Des Moines Menace in the USL Premier Development League. In 2004 and 2005, he played for the Michigan Bucks.

=== Professional ===
In 2006, Kabwe turned professional and moved to the Charlotte Eagles in the USL Second Division. In March 2009, he signed with the Carolina RailHawks in the USL First Division.

Kabwe was not listed on the 2011 roster for Carolina released April 4, 2011.

=== International ===
Kabwe has played for the Zimbabwe U-20 and U-23 national teams in 2001 and 2003.

== Personal life ==
His brothers, Samson and Protasho, as well as his sister Berita were all footballers.
