= Catherine Mbengono =

Cameroonian footballer

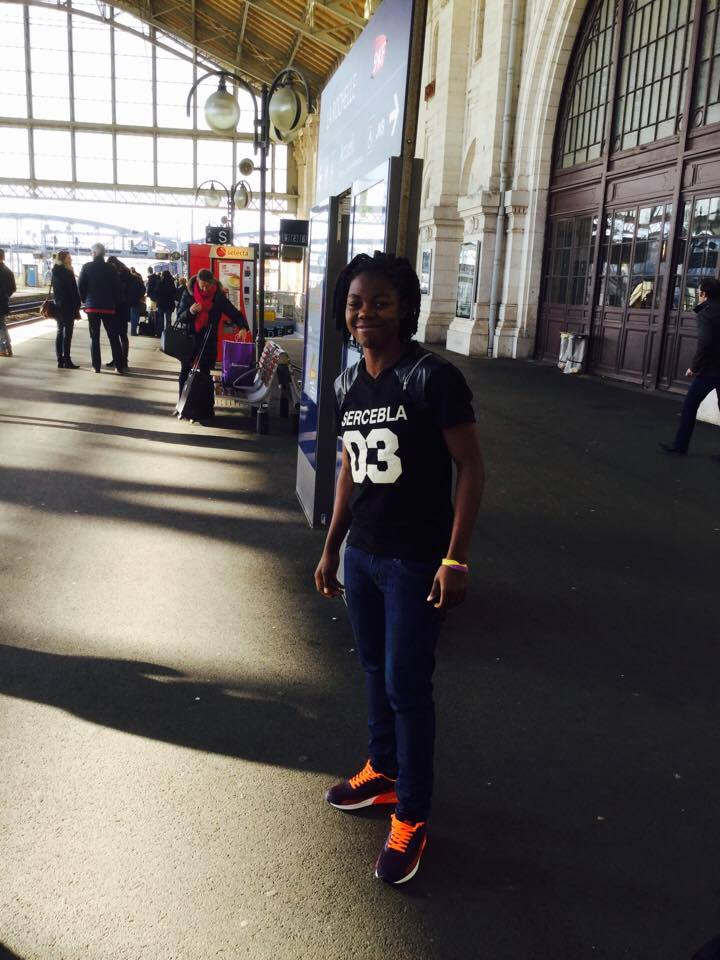

Personal information
- Full name: Catherine Charnelle Mbengono
- Date of birth: 8 September 1996 (age 30)
- Place of birth: Yaoundé, Cameroon
- Height: 1.60 m (5 ft 3 in)
- Positions: Left back; midfielder

Team information
- Current team: Amazone FAP

Senior career*
Years	Team	Apps	(Gls)
2011–2013	Green City Yaoundé		
2014	Lorema Yaoundé		
2015–2016	Green City Yaoundé		
2016–2018	Lorient	24	(2)
2019	Green City Yaoundé		
2019–2020	Éclair de Sa'a		
2020–	Amazone FAP		

International career^{‡}
2015	Cameroon U20	1+	(1)
2018–	Cameroon	3+	(1)
- * Club domestic league appearances and goals ‡ National team caps and goals as of 12 November 2019

Catherine Charnelle Mbengono (born 8 September 1996) is a Cameroonian footballer who plays as a left back for Amazone FAP and the Cameroon women's national team.

== Club career ==
Mbengono played for French Division 2 Féminine club FC Lorient. She joined Éclair de Sa'a on 10 October 2019.

== International career ==
Mbengono represented Cameroon at the 2015 African U-20 Women's World Cup Qualifying Tournament. At senior level, she played the 2018 COSAFA Women's Championship and the 2020 CAF Women's Olympic Qualifying Tournament (fourth round).

== International goals ==
Scores and results list Cameroon's goal tally first

No.	Date	Venue	Opponent	Score	Result	Competition
1	18 September 2018	Gelvandale Stadium, Port Elizabeth, South Africa	Lesotho	6–0	6–0	2018 COSAFA Women's Championship
