= Seychelles women's national football team =

Seychelles
- Association: Seychelles Football Federation
- Confederation: CAF (Africa)
- Sub-confederation: COSAFA (Southern Africa)
- Head coach: Chris Yip-Au
- Top scorer: Natacha Bibi (13+)
- FIFA code: SEY
First colours	Second colours

FIFA ranking
- Current: 175 (16 June 2026)
- Highest: 160 (June 2022)
- Lowest: 176 (December 2025)

First international
- Mozambique 7–3 Seychelles (White River, South Africa; 5 July 2015)

Biggest win
- Maldives 0–4 Seychelles (Malé, Maldives; 18 February 2022)

Biggest defeat
- Malawi 17–0 Seychelles (Blantyre, Malawi; 25 September 2023); Malawi 17–0 Seychelles (Blantyre, Malawi; 28 September 2023)

The Seychelles women's national football team is the national team of the Seychelles.

The national team, captained by Abby Boone, played in two eighty-minute long games in 2005 in a youth tournament hosted by Mauritius, with the Seychelles losing both matches. An official under-17 national team exists and had regular training sessions in 2006.

The sport faces several development problems inside the country including a lack of popularity for the sport, and few female players and teams. Women have gained football leadership positions in the country with one coaching a men's team and another umpiring international matches. There are other development issues for the sport that are ones facing the whole of Africa.

== History ==
The Seychelles Football Federation was founded in 1979, and became a FIFA affiliate in 1986. Women's football is represented in the federation by specific mandate and currently they employ one full-time employee to look after the women's game.

The Seychelles played in a single FIFA sanctioned match between 1950 and June 2012.

In 2005, a youth team from Seychelles competed in a three nation tournament hosted by Mauritius, where all games were 80 minutes in length. They lost to Mauritius 1–4 and also to Réunion 0–9. Overall, they finished last, scoring only one goal in the competition. In 2005, Zambia was supposed to host a regional COSAFA women's football tournament, with ten teams agreeing to participate, including South Africa, Zimbabwe, Mozambique, Malawi, Seychelles, Mauritius, Madagascar, Zambia, Botswana, Namibia, Lesotho and Swaziland. Seychelles did not record a match in the event.

In 2006, the country did not have an official FIFA recognised senior "A" team, a situation unchanged by 2009. However, according to FIFA's Women's Football Today, the country has an official under-17 team, the Seychelles women's national under-17 football team. In 2016, they had two training sessions a week but had yet to record an official FIFA recognised match.

The country did not have a team competing in the 2010 African Women's Championship, or at the 2011 All Africa Games. In March 2012, the team was not ranked in the world by FIFA due to inactivity.

In 2022, Seychelles entered the FIFA/Coca-Cola Women's World Ranking for the first time under the Singaporean head coach Angeline Chua. For a team to be ranked on the FIFA list, the team has to play a minimum of six international matches against ranked teams. On 4 April 2022, the Seychelles women's national team played its sixth international match in Singapore.

In October 2023, Singaporean Chris Yip-Au joined the Seychelles Football Federation as its head of women's football and women's national team coach.

== Results and fixtures ==
The following is a list of match results in the last 12 months, as well as any future matches that have been scheduled.

Legend

Win Draw Lose Fixture

=== 2025 ===
25 November 2025 Friendly match	Singapore	9–0	Seychelles	Bukit Gombak, Singapore
15:30 UTC+4	F. Ruhaizat; S. Zu’risqha; R. Azman; S. Rosielin; (o.g.)	Report		Stadium: Bukit Gombak Stadium; Attendance: 0 (Behind closed doors)

28 November 2025 Friendly match	Singapore	7–0	Seychelles	Bukit Gombak, Singapore
15:30 UTC+4	L.X. Lim 13'; F. Ruhaizat 16'; S. Zu’risqha 36', 40'; D. Tan 51', 71'; S. Nurinsyirah 65'	Report		Stadium: Bukit Gombak Stadium

=== 2026 ===
30 September 2026 Friendly	Ethiopia	16–0	Seychelles	Addis Ababa, Ethiopia
15:00 UTC+3	Mihret Ayele 22'; Turist Lema 24'; Milen Gayim 27'; Nigist Bekele 30', 43'; Estegenet Girma 45'; Tarikuwa Debiso 45+2', 67'; Emush Daniel 48', 79'; Aregash Kalsa 60', 76'; Dagmawit Solomon 69'; Betelhem Mentelo 72', 89'; Mahlet Mitiku 80'			Stadium: Abebe Bikila Stadium; Referee: Emmanuela Akoo (South Sudan)

3 October 2026 Friendly	Ethiopia	10–0	Seychelles	Addis Ababa, Ethiopia
15:00 UTC+3	አሻጓታ ማሪ 3' (o.g.); Emush Daniel 6', 15'; Betelhem Bekele 7'; Dagmawit Solomon 22', 32', 57' (pen.); Betelhem Mentelo 58'; Turist Lema 68'; Rediet Assresahagn 90'			Stadium: Abebe Bikila Stadium

8 October 2026 2028 CAF Women's Olympic Q	Seychelles	0–11	Kenya	Nairobi, Kenya
15:00 UTC+3		Report	Nekesa 8', 43'; Muteshi 25', 54'; Madalina 61', 82'; Amunyolete 83'; Airo 86', 90+1'; Mideva 87', 90+3'	Stadium: Nyayo National Stadium; Referee: Cacilda Fernando (Mozambique)

13 October 2026 2028 CAF Women's Olympic Q	Kenya	v	Seychelles	Nairobi, Kenya
15:00 UTC+3				Stadium: Nyayo National Stadium

== Coaching staff ==
=== Current coaching staff ===
As of September 2023

Position	Name	Ref.
Team Manager	(Seychelles) Peggy Freminot	
Assistant Team Manager	(Seychelles) Militna Marie	
Technical Director	(France) Osama Haroun	
Head coach	(Singapore) Chris Yip-Au	
Assistant coach	(Seychelles) Florence Marie	
Coach	(Seychelles) Michel Renaud	
Goalkeeping coach	(Seychelles) Slim William	

=== Head coaches ===
Caretaker head coaches/managers are listed in italics.

- (Singapore) Angeline Chua (2021–2023)
- (Seychelles) Florence Marie (2023)
- (Singapore) Chris Yip-Au (2023–present)

== Players ==
=== Current squad ===
- This is the selected squad for the two international friendlies vs Singapore on 25 and 28 November 2025.

No.	Pos.	Player	Date of birth (age)	Club
		Kurchia Poris	6 June 2004 (age 22)	(Seychelles Football Federation) Seychelles
		Samira Florentine	20 February 1996 (age 30)	(Seychelles Football Federation) Marine Victoria City
		Sheryl Benoit	23 February 2009 (age 17)	(Seychelles Football Federation) Young Kestrel
		Manuella Accouche	28 November 1998 (age 27)	(Seychelles Football Federation)
		Shannon Malvina	3 March 2008 (age 18)	(Seychelles Football Federation)
		Yara Radafison	11 January 2001 (age 25)	(Seychelles Football Federation)
		Chantina Esparon	9 December 1998 (age 27)	(Seychelles Football Federation) Marine Victoria City
		Janella Moustache	24 May 1991 (age 35)	(Seychelles Football Federation)
		Kimbelly Chang Tak Hue	3 May 2006 (age 20)	Seychelles U17
		Itarra Lagrenade	26 December 2002 (age 23)	(Seychelles Football Federation) Mont Fleuri Rovers
		Elisha Adrienne	3 November 2001 (age 24)	(Seychelles Football Federation)
		Alisha Matatiken	13 March 2003 (age 23)	(Seychelles Football Federation) Seychelles
		Rannia Chetty	7 April 2003 (age 23)	(Seychelles Football Federation) Mont Fleuri Rovers
		Veena Cadeau	10 September 1999 (age 27)	(Seychelles Football Federation)
		Elvina Hoareau	21 July 2008 (age 18)	Seychelles U16
		Lisa Dubois	31 May 2007 (age 19)	(Seychelles Football Federation) Young Kestrel
		Nerlice Fred	18 May 1999 (age 27)	(Seychelles Football Federation) Mont Fleuri Rovers
		Elielle Francoise	5 June 2009 (age 17)	(Seychelles Football Federation) Young Kestrel
		Keisha Moustache	4 May 2009 (age 17)	(Seychelles Football Federation) Young Kestrel
		Pascallina Moustache (Captain)	23 May 1991 (age 35)	(Hellenic Football Federation) Irodotos

=== Recent call-ups ===
The following players have been called up to a Seychelles squad in the past 12 months.

Pos.	Player	Date of birth (age)	Caps	Goals	Club	Latest call-up

=== Previous squads ===
COSAFA Women's Championship

- 2024 COSAFA Women's Championship squad

== Competitive record ==
=== FIFA Women's World Cup ===
FIFA Women's World Cup record
Year	Result	GP	W	D*	L	GF	GA	GD
(China) 1991	did not exist							
(Sweden) 1995	did not exist							
(United States) 1999	did not exist							
(United States) 2003	did not exist							
(China) 2007	did not enter							
(Germany) 2011	did not enter							
(Canada) 2015	did not qualify							
(France) 2019	did not enter							
(Australia) (New Zealand) 2023	did not enter							
(Brazil) 2027	to be determined							
Total	0/10	-	-	-	-	-	-	-

=== Olympic Games ===
Summer Olympics record
Year	Result	Pld	W	D*	L	GS	GA	GD
(United States) 1996	did not exist							
(Australia) 2000	did not exist							
(Greece) 2004	did not exist							
(China) 2008	did not Qualify							
(United Kingdom) 2012	did not enter							
(Brazil) 2016	did not enter							
(Japan) 2020	did not enter							
(France) 2024	did not enter							
Total	0/8	0	0	0	0	0	0	0

*Draws include knockout matches decided on penalty kicks.

=== Africa Women Cup of Nations ===
Africa Women Cup of Nations record
Year	Result	Matches	Wins	Draws	Losses	GF	GA
1991 to (South Africa) 2004	did not exist						
(Nigeria) 2006 to (Equatorial Guinea) 2012	did not enter						
(Namibia) 2014	did not qualify						
(Cameroon) 2016	did not enter						
(Ghana) 2018	did not enter						
(Republic of the Congo) 2020	Cancelled due to COVID-19 pandemic in Africa						
(Morocco) 2022	did not enter						
(Morocco) 2024	Did not enter						
Total	0/12	-	-	-	-	-	-

=== African Games ===
African Games record
Year	Result	Matches	Wins	Draws	Losses	GF	GA	GD
(Nigeria) 2003	Did Not exist							
(Algeria) 2007	Did not enter							
(Mozambique) 2011	Did not enter							
(Republic of the Congo) 2015	Did not enter							
(Morocco) 2019	Did not enter							
(Ghana) 2023	Did not enter							
Total	0/5	0	0	0	0	0	0	0

=== Regional ===
==== COSAFA Women's Championship ====
COSAFA Women's Championship record
Year	Round	Pld	W	D*	L	GS	GA	GD	Squad
(Zimbabwe) 2002	did not exist								
(Zambia) 2006	did not enter								
(Angola) 2008	did not enter								
(Zimbabwe) 2011	did not enter								
(Zimbabwe) 2017	did not enter								
(South Africa) 2018	did not enter								
(South Africa) 2019	did not enter								
(South Africa) 2020	did not enter								
(South Africa) 2021	did not enter								
(South Africa) 2022	did not enter								
(South Africa) 2023	did not enter								
(South Africa) 2024	Group Stage	3	0	0	3	1	21	−20	Squad
Total	Group stage	3	0	0	3	1	21	−20	

*Draws include knockout matches decided on penalty kicks.

== See also ==
- Sport in Seychelles
  - Football in Seychelles
    - Women's football in Seychelles
- Seychelles men's national football team
