= Eliane Bodolo =

Cameroonian footballer (born 1991)

Éliane Manbolamo
Personal information
- Full name: Éliane Manbolamo Bodolo
- Date of birth: 3 July 1991 (age 35)
- Place of birth: Yaoundé, Cameroon
- Height: 1.83 m (6 ft 0 in)
- Position: Centre back

Team information
- Current team: CD Argual

Senior career*
| Years | Team | Apps | (Gls) |
| 2019–2020 | Extremadura | 14 | (2) |
| 2020–2022 | Juan Grande | 38 | (1) |
| 2022–2024 | Getafe Femenino | | |
| 2024–2025 | Odisha | | |
| 2025– | CD Argual | | |

International career
- Cameroon
- * Club domestic league appearances and goals

Éliane Manbolamo Bodolo (born 3 July 1991) is a Cameroonian professional footballer who plays as a centre back for the Spanish club CD Argual and the Cameroon women's national team.

== Club career ==
Manbolamo joined Spanish Primera Nacional club Extremadura UD on 27 September 2019.

== International goals ==
Scores and results list Cameroon's goal tally first

| No. | Date | Venue | Opponent | Score | Result | Competition |
|---|---|---|---|---|---|---|
| 1 | 18 September 2018 | Gelvandale Stadium, Port Elizabeth, South Africa | Lesotho | 1–0 | 6–0 | 2018 COSAFA Women's Championship |
