= Tracy Akiror =

Ugandan footballer

Tracy Jones
Personal information
- Full name: Tracy Jones Akiror
- Date of birth: August 25, 1997
- Place of birth: Mulago, Kampala, Uganda
- Height: 1.65 m (5 ft 5 in)
- Position: Midfielder

Team information
- Current team: AFC Ann Arbor

College career
Years	Team	Apps	(Gls)
2019	Seminole State Trojans	22	(10)
2020-2022	Lindsey Wilson Blue Raiders	19	(1)

Senior career*
Years	Team	Apps	(Gls)
2013-2014	UCU Lady Cardinals		
2014-2018	Kawempe Muslim		
2022	AFC Ann Arbor	5	(1)
2023	AFC Ann Arbor	10	(1)

International career
2013	Uganda U20		
2016-2022	Uganda		
- * Club domestic league appearances and goals

Tracy Jones Akiror, commonly known as Tracy Jones, is a Ugandan footballer who plays as a midfielder for AFC Ann Arbor. She has represented the Uganda women's national team, known as the Crested Cranes.

== Early life ==
Akiror was born on 25 August 1997 at Mulago Hospital in Kampala, Uganda, to James Olongaliya and Robinah Nassali. She grew up in Luzira, a suburb of Kampala.

She joined Luzira Church of Uganda Primary School in 2004 and began playing football in 2006 after watching girls play at the school. She recalled a 10-0 victory by her school against Biira Primary School as one of her happiest early experiences in football.

Akiror later attended St Mary's Secondary School in Nsumba, where she received a football-sponsored bursary. After completing her Ordinary Level studies, she joined St Julian High School in Gayaza for Advanced Level education, also on a bursary.

Her youth football career began at Destiny Soccer Academy in Luzira, where she played with boys. She later joined SMS Academy and Saska Academy. Her youth career at the three academies was recorded as 2005-2007 at Destiny, 2008-2009 at SMS and 2010-2012 at Saska.

Akiror also spoke about training and playing with boys and men in the Butabika area when she was not with her club or the national team. She credited coaches Michael Kalyesubula and Ayub Khalifah with encouraging her to continue playing when she considered giving up. She identified Uganda Cranes midfielder Tonny Mawejje as a football role model, particularly for his style of play.

== College career ==
In 2019, Akiror moved to the United States to pursue college education and continue playing football. She joined Seminole State College in Oklahoma and played for its women's soccer team, the Seminole State Trojans. During the 2019 season, she made 22 appearances and scored 10 goals.

In May 2020, she transferred to Lindsey Wilson College in Kentucky, where she joined the Lindsey Wilson Blue Raiders women's soccer team. She made three appearances during the 2020 season and 16 during the 2021 season, scoring one goal in 2021.

Akiror graduated from Lindsey Wilson College with a bachelor's degree in Human Resource Management in April 2023.

== Club career ==
Akiror began her senior club career with UCU Lady Cardinals, whom she represented from 2013 to 2014. She made 15 appearances and scored eight goals for the team. She subsequently joined Kawempe Muslim after attracting the club's attention through her performances in youth and school football.

Her debut for Kawempe Muslim came in a 13-0 victory against Kakira in 2015. She was deployed as a centre-back and recorded 13 clean sheets in 16 matches during the season. Kawempe won the inaugural FUFA Women Elite League title in the 2014-15 season.

Akiror was part of the Kawempe Muslim side that won four consecutive FUFA Women Elite League titles, from the 2014-15 to the 2017-18 season.

During the 2017-18 season, she scored in the play-offs and netted the winning goal in the final against Olila High School. She was subsequently named the league's Most Valuable Player.

After the 2017-18 season, Akiror left Kawempe Muslim to continue her education and football career in the United States, where she joined Lindsey Wilson College.

In 2022, she joined AFC Ann Arbor, a club competing in the USL W League. She made five appearances and scored one goal during the 2022 season.

She returned to AFC Ann Arbor for the 2023 season, making ten appearances and scoring one goal. She was listed as a midfielder on the club's roster. She was also listed on the club's 2026 roster.

== International career ==
=== Youth ===
Akiror represented Uganda at under-20 level. In 2013, she was part of the Uganda U20 team that eliminated South Sudan from the qualifying competition for the 2014 FIFA U-20 Women's World Cup. Uganda won the two-legged tie 22-0 on aggregate, winning 9-0 away and 13-0 at home. Uganda subsequently withdrew from the qualifying competition because of financial constraints.

=== Senior ===
Akiror became part of the Uganda women's national football team, known as the Crested Cranes. She travelled with the senior team to Kisumu in July 2016 for an international friendly against Kenya, which Uganda lost 4-0.

In 2018, Akiror was named captain of the Crested Cranes. She led Uganda at the 2018 CECAFA Women's Championship in Rwanda, where the team finished as runners-up.

Later that year, she represented Uganda at the 2018 COSAFA Women's Championship in South Africa. Uganda finished third in the tournament. Akiror scored in the team's 2-1 group-stage victory over Zimbabwe and converted the penalty that secured a 1-0 win against Zambia in the third-place play-off.

Akiror was nominated for the 2018 FUFA Female Footballer of the Year award and finished as runner-up to goalkeeper Ruth Aturo.

In June 2022, she was named in Uganda's 26-player squad for the 2022 Women's Africa Cup of Nations in Morocco.

=== International goals ===
Scores and results list Uganda's goal tally first.

No.	Date	Venue	Opponent	Score	Result	Competition
1	17 September 2018	Isaac Wolfson Stadium, Port Elizabeth, South Africa	Zimbabwe	2-0	2-1	2018 COSAFA Women's Championship
2	21 September 2018	Isaac Wolfson Stadium, Port Elizabeth, South Africa	Zambia	1-0	1-0	2018 COSAFA Women's Championship
