= Rutendo Makore =

Zimbabwean footballer (born 1992)

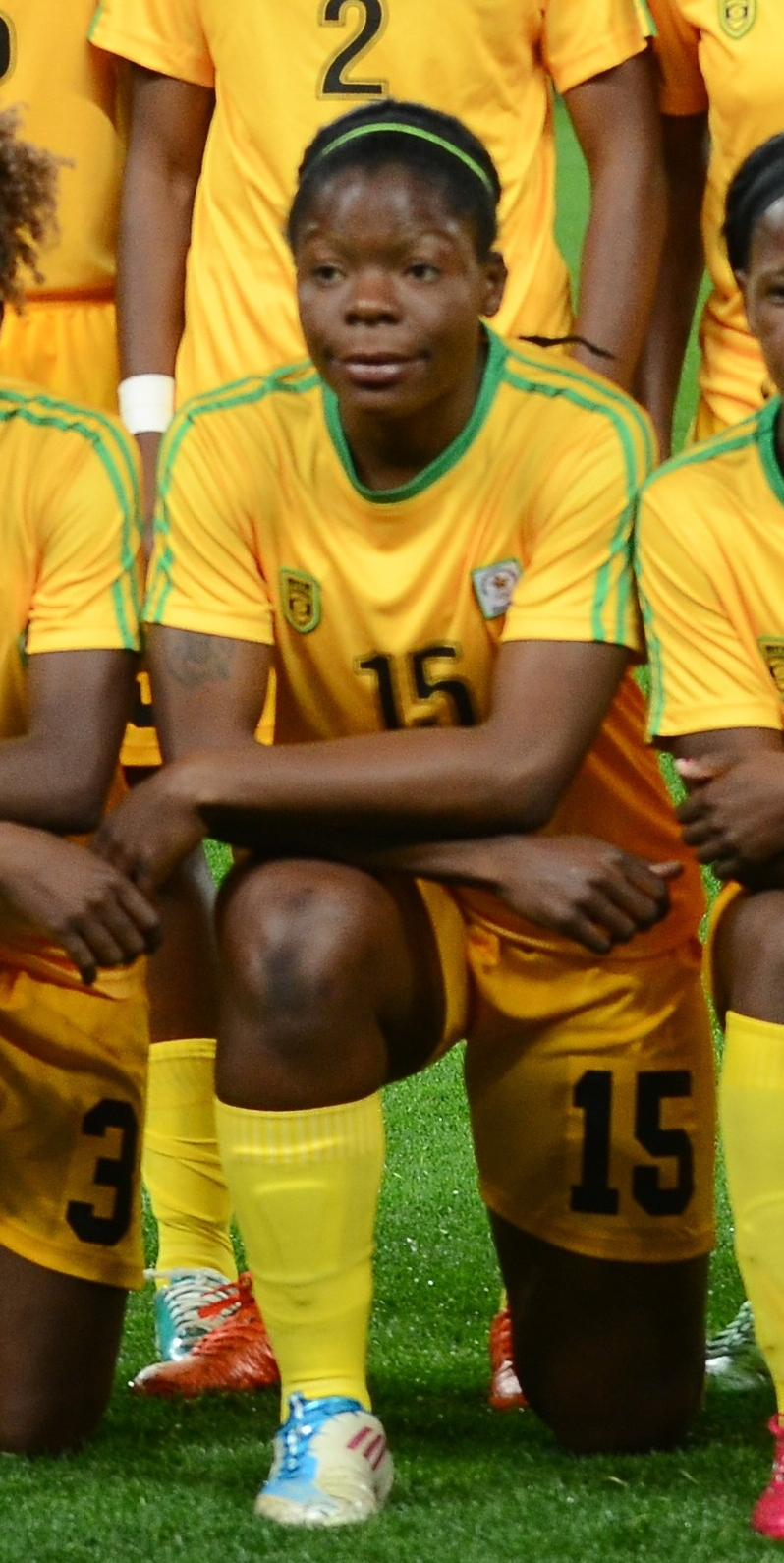
- Makore at the 2016 Olympics

Personal information
- Date of birth: 30 September 1992 (age 34)
- Place of birth: Zimbabwe
- Height: 1.65 m (5 ft 5 in)
- Position: Forward

Senior career*
Years	Team	Apps	(Gls)
2017–2018	Sporting Huelva	9	(3)

International career
- Zimbabwe
- * Club domestic league appearances and goals

Rutendo Makore (born 30 September 1992) is a Zimbabwean footballer who plays as a forward for the Zimbabwe women's national team.

She represented her country in their Olympic debut at the 2016 Summer Olympics.

In the Olympic match versus Germany it was Makore who set up a goal that took their goalkeeper Almuth Schult by surprise. The ball was rebounded but Kudakwashe Basopo made it a goal leaving the score at 6–1 against Zimbabwe.

== International goals ==
No.	Date	Venue	Opponent	Score	Result	Competition
1.	13 September 2017	Barbourfields Stadium, Bulawayo, Zimbabwe	Madagascar	1–0	4–0	2017 COSAFA Women's Championship
2.	13 September 2017	Barbourfields Stadium, Bulawayo, Zimbabwe	Madagascar	2–0	4–0	2017 COSAFA Women's Championship
3.	13 September 2017	Barbourfields Stadium, Bulawayo, Zimbabwe	Madagascar	3–0	4–0	2017 COSAFA Women's Championship
4.	13 September 2017	Barbourfields Stadium, Bulawayo, Zimbabwe	Madagascar	4–0	4–0	2017 COSAFA Women's Championship
5.	15 September 2017	Barbourfields Stadium, Bulawayo, Zimbabwe	Zambia	1–1	1–1	2017 COSAFA Women's Championship
6.	17 September 2017	Luveve Stadium, Bulawayo, Zimbabwe	Malawi	1–0	3–3	2017 COSAFA Women's Championship
7.	17 September 2017	Luveve Stadium, Bulawayo, Zimbabwe	Malawi	2–0	3–3	2017 COSAFA Women's Championship
8.	17 September 2017	Luveve Stadium, Bulawayo, Zimbabwe	Malawi	3–1	3–3	2017 COSAFA Women's Championship
9.	21 September 2017	Barbourfields Stadium, Bulawayo, Zimbabwe	Kenya	1–0	4–0	2017 COSAFA Women's Championship
10.	24 September 2017	Barbourfields Stadium, Bulawayo, Zimbabwe	South Africa	1–1	1–2	2017 COSAFA Women's Championship
11.	17 September 2018	Wolfson Stadium, KwaZakele, South Africa	Uganda	1–2	1–2	2018 COSAFA Women's Championship
