= Jacqueline Nkole =

Zambian footballer (born 1998)

Personal information
- Date of birth: 5 August 1998 (age 28)
- Position: Defender

Team information
- Current team: Indeni Roses
- Number: 20

International career^{‡}
Years	Team	Apps	(Gls)
2018	Zambia	1	(0)
- ‡ National team caps and goals as of 16 June 2019

Jacqueline Nkole (born 5 August 1998) is a Zambian international footballer who plays as a defender for the Zambia women's national football team. She competed for Zambia at the 2018 Africa Women Cup of Nations, playing in one match.
