= Veronique Raharimalala =

Malagasy football player

Personal information
- Full name: Rina Marie Veronique Raharimalala
- Date of birth: 27 August 1987 (age 39)
- Place of birth: Madagascar
- Position: Midfielder

Team information
- Current team: AC SABNAM

International career^{‡}
Years	Team	Apps	(Gls)
2015–	Madagascar		(2)
- ‡ National team caps and goals as of 4 October 2023

Rina Marie Veronique Raharimalala (born 27 August 1987) is a Malagasy football player. she plays for AC SABNAM in the Malagasy Women's Football Championship and Madagascar national football team.

== National team career ==
In February 2015, Raharimalala was selected for the first-ever Madagascar women's team to compete in the 2015 African Games qualification matches against Botswana.

== National team statistics ==
Appearances and goals by national team and year
National team	Year	Apps	Goals
Madagascar	2015	+2	1
Madagascar	2017	+0	0
Madagascar	2023	1	1
Total		+3	2

Scores and results list Madagascar's goal tally first, score column indicates score after each Raharimalala goal.

List of international goals scored by Veronique Raharimalala
No.	Date	Venue	Opponent	Score	Result	Competition
1	6 March 2015	Botswana National Stadium, Gaborone, Botswana	Botswana	1–0	1–0	2015 African Games Qualification
2	4 October 2023	Lucas Moripe Stadium, Pretoria, South Africa	Eswatini	1–0	1–2	2023 COSAFA Women's Championship
