= Berita Kabwe =

Zimbabwean footballer (born 1990)

Personal information
- Date of birth: 17 December 1990 (age 35)
- Position: Midfielder

Team information
- Current team: Rivers Angels

Senior career*
Years	Team	Apps	(Gls)
- Flame lily
- Rivers Angels

International career
- Zimbabwe
- * Club domestic league appearances and goals

Berita Kabwe (born 17 December 1990) is a Zimbabwean footballer who plays as a midfielder for NWFL Premiership club Rivers Angels FC and the Zimbabwe women's national team.

== Club career ==
Kabwe has played for Flame lily in Zimbabwe and for Rivers Angels in Nigeria.

== International career ==
Kabwe capped for Zimbabwe at senior level during the 2017 COSAFA Women's Championship.

== Personal life ==
Her brothers, Samson, Joseph, and Protasho, were all footballers.
