= Lweendo Chisamu =

Zambian footballer (born 1996)

Personal information
- Date of birth: 25 February 1996 (age 30)
- Position: Midfielder

Senior career*
Years	Team	Apps	(Gls)
- Chibolya Queens

International career^{‡}
- Zambia
- * Club domestic league appearances and goals ‡ National team caps and goals as of 11 october 2014 (before the 2014 African Women's Championship)

Lweendo Chisamu (born 25 February 1996) is a Zambian footballer who plays as a midfielder for the Zambia women's national football team. She was part of the team at the 2014 African Women's Championship. At the club level she played for Chibolya Queens in Zambia.
