= Wisdom Mutasa =

Zimbabwean footballer (born 1995)

Personal information
- Full name: Wisdom Munashe Mutasa
- Date of birth: 15 May 1995 (age 31)
- Place of birth: Chitungwiza, Zimbabwe
- Position: Midfielder

Senior career*
Years	Team	Apps	(Gls)
2013	Motor Action F.C.		
2014-2015	F.C. Platinum		
2015	FK Senica	0	(0)
2016	ZPC Kariba F.C.		
2016-2017	Dynamos F.C.		
2017	Singida United F.C.		
2018	CAPS United F.C.		
2019	Manica Diamonds F.C.		
2019	Black Rhinos F.C.		

International career
2014-2015	Zimbabwe	2	(0)
- * Club domestic league appearances and goals

Wisdom Mutasa (born 15 May 1995 in Zimbabwe) is a Zimbabwean footballer.
