= Vincent Omumbo =

Kenyan footballer

Personal information
- Full name: Vincent Omumbo
- Date of birth: 2 February 1990 (age 36)
- Place of birth: Kenya
- Position: Midfielder

International career^{‡}
Years	Team	Apps	(Gls)
2014–	Kenya	1	(0)
- ‡ National team caps and goals as of 21:18, 18 April 2015 (UTC)

Vincent Omumbo (born 2 February 1990) is a Kenyan professional footballer who plays as a midfielder.
