= Angeline Chua =

Singaporean footballer

Personal information
- Full name: Angeline Chua Kai Yi
- Date of birth: 7 November 1988 (age 38)
- Place of birth: Singapore
- Position: Midfielder

International career^{‡}
Years	Team	Apps	(Gls)
2007–2019	Singapore	32	(1)

Managerial career
- 2021–2023: Seychelles
- 2023–2025: Fiji
- 2026: Singapore U16
- ‡ National team caps and goals as of 16 September 2020

Angeline Chua Kai Yi (born 7 November 1988), known as Angeline Chua, is a Singaporean women's football manager who leads the Fiji women's national football team, and a former footballer who played as a midfielder for the Singapore women's national team. She was previously Seychelles Football Federation's director of women's football and head coach of Seychelles women's senior national team.

== Coaching career ==
Chua started coaching when she was a polytechnic student, coaching Arion Football Academy's U-4 to U-8 age groups.

Chua subsequently became the assistant coach of the Singapore women's football team's U-14 and U-16 teams. She would later become the national Under-14 women's head coach.

In April 2021, Chua took up a two-year contract to become Seychelles Football Federation's (SFF) director of women's football and head coach of Seychelles women's senior national team. During her time with, she revitalised women's football in Seychelles, putting together a team that was able to be competitive in the matches played. She was instrumental in putting the team on the FIFA ranking for the first time in 2022.

=== Fiji women's ===
After the expiration of her contract in February 2023, she was appointed head coach of the Fiji women's national football team on 1 March 2023. Since she took over, she started to encourage the players to speak up and communicate in order to improve on the teamwork and team's performance. Her focus was mainly on developing youth players and guiding them into the national team.

In 2024, Chua made history by leading the Under-20 team to their first-ever FIFA U-20 Women's World Cup appearance in Colombia.

In 2025, Chua came under scrutiny following the National team's performance at the 2025 OFC Women's Nations Cup. Fiji FA council expressed their disappointment and would relook at the coaching team. The host team finished in fourth after losing 2-0 to Samoa in the third-place match.

In September 2025, Chua then lead the Under-19 team to a third place after beating Cook Islands on penalties.

In November 2025, Chua announced that she will be stepping down after the 2025 MSG Prime Minister's Cup. In her final assignment, the team finished second in the competition.

On 23 September 2026, Football Association of Singapore announced that Chua will be leading the Singapore U16 team in the 2027 AFC U-17 Women's Asian Cup qualification.

== International goals ==
Scores and results list Singapore's goal tally first.

No.	Date	Venue	Opponent	Score	Result	Competition
1.	6 November 2019	Hisor Central Stadium, Hisor, Tajikistan	Mongolia	1–2	2–2	2020 AFC Women's Olympic Qualifying Tournament
