= Sophie Farafanirina =

Malagasy footballer (born 1992

Sophie Irène Farafanirina (born 19 April 1992) is a Malagasy footballer who plays as a striker.

== Early life ==
Farafanirina started playing football at the age of 13.

== Club career ==
In 2015 she was top scorer of the Madagascar league with 26 goals in six matches playing for AS Sabnam. Farafanirina played for Malagasy side AS Sabnam, helping the club win the league. She then signed for French side AS Pierrots Vauban Strasbourg, becoming the first Malagasy female player to play abroad.

== International career ==
Farafanirina played for the Madagascar women's national football team. She is the top scorer of her national team with 16 goals.

== Style of play ==
Farafanirina mainly operates as a striker and is known for her dribbling ability.
