= Salomão Mondlane =

Mozambican footballer

Personal information
- Full name: Salomão Abílio Mondlane
- Date of birth: 2 October 1995 (age 31)
- Place of birth: Maputo, Mozambique
- Height: 1.87 m (6 ft 2 in)
- Position: Center-back

Team information
- Current team: Costa do Sol
- Number: 30

Senior career*
Years	Team	Apps	(Gls)
2014–	Costa do Sol	25	(1)
2016	→ Ferroviário Nampula (loan)		
2018–2019	→ Vitória Guimarães B (loan)	0	(0)

International career^{‡}
2015–	Mozambique	4	(1)
- * Club domestic league appearances and goals as of 24 July 2020 ‡ National team caps and goals as of 24 July 2020

Salomão Abílio Mondlane (born 2 October 1995) is a Mozambican footballer who plays as a defender for Costa do Sol and the Mozambique national football team.

== Career ==
=== International ===
Mondlane made his senior international debut on 29 March 2015, playing the entirety of a 2-1 friendly victory over Botswana. He scored his first international goal two years later, netting in the 5th minute of a 2–2 draw with Madagascar during African Nations Championship qualifying.

== Career statistics ==
=== International ===
As of matches played 23 July 2017.

National team	Year	Apps	Goals
Mozambique	2015	1	0
Mozambique	2017	3	1
Total		4	1

==== International Goals ====
Scores and results list Mozambique's goal tally first.

Goal	Date	Venue	Opponent	Score	Result	Competition
1.	16 July 2017	Mahamasina Municipal Stadium, Antananarivo, Madagascar	Madagascar	1–0	2–2	2018 African Nations Championship qualification
