= Allassane Sango =

Burkinabé footballer

Personal information
- Date of birth: 7 January 1993 (age 33)
- Place of birth: Burkina Faso
- Position: Defender

Team information
- Current team: ASFA Yennenga

Allassane Sango (born 7 January 1993) is a Burkina Faso professional footballer who plays as a defender for ASFA Yennenga and the Burkina Faso national football team.

== International career ==
In January 2014, coach Brama Traore, invited him to be a part of the Burkina Faso squad for the 2014 African Nations Championship. The team was eliminated in the group stages after losing to Uganda and Zimbabwe and then drawing with Morocco.
