= Friday Samu =

Zambian association football player (born 1995)

Personal information
- Full name: Friday John Samu
- Date of birth: 9 May 1995 (age 31)
- Place of birth: Lusaka, Zambia
- Height: 1.78 m (5 ft 10 in)
- Position: Forward

Team information
- Current team: Maritzburg United
- Number: 20

Senior career*
Years	Team	Apps	(Gls)
2014–2022	Green Buffaloes		
2022–	Maritzburg United	25	(7)

International career^{‡}
2017–	Zambia	6	(0)
- * Club domestic league appearances and goals as of 10 November 2022 ‡ National team caps and goals as of 10 November 2022

Friday Samu (born 9 May 1995) is a Zambian professional football player who plays as a forward for the club Maritzburg United.
