= Anita Mulenga =

Zambian footballer (born 1995)

Personal information
- Date of birth: 3 May 1995 (age 31)
- Position: Defender

Senior career*
Years	Team	Apps	(Gls)
- Green Buffaloes F.C.

International career^{‡}
- Zambia
Medal record
Representing Zambia
Women's Africa Cup of Nations
Third place	2022 Morocco
- * Club domestic league appearances and goals ‡ National team caps and goals as of 11 october 2014 (before the 2014 African Women's Championship)

Anita Mulenga (born 3 May 1995) is a Zambian footballer who plays as a defender for the Zambia women's national team. She was part of the team at the 2014 African Women's Championship. On club level she played for Green Buffaloes F.C. in Zambia.
