= 2018 COSAFA Women's Championship =

Tournament details
- Host country: South Africa
- Dates: 12 – 22 September 2018
- Teams: 12 (from 1 confederation)
- Venues: 2 (in 1 host city)

Final positions
- Champions: South Africa (5th title)
- Runners-up: Cameroon
- Third place: Uganda
- Fourth place: Zambia

Tournament statistics
- Matches played: 22
- Goals scored: 64 (2.91 per match)
- Top scorer(s): (South Africa) Linda Motlhalo (4 goals)
- Best player: (Cameroon) Genevieve Ngo Mbeleck
- Best goalkeeper: (Uganda) Ruth Aturo
- Fair play award: Zambia

The 2018 COSAFA Women's Championship was an international football tournament for national teams organised by COSAFA, teams from Southern Africa. It took place from 12 to 22 September in the Nelson Mandela Bay Metropolitan Municipality, South Africa.

== Participants ==
Twelve teams take part in the competition, 10 of the 14 COSAFA members and also Uganda and Cameroon as invited guest nations. The draw was held on 29 August.

- Botswana
- Cameroon (invite)
- Eswatini
- Lesotho
- Madagascar
- Malawi
- Mozambique
- Namibia
- South Africa
- Uganda (invite)
- Zambia
- Zimbabwe

== Venues ==
Groups A, B, C, Semifinals and Final	Groups A and B	Host location in South Africa.
KwaZakele	Port Elizabeth	Host location in South Africa.
Wolfson Stadium	Gelvandale Stadium	Host location in South Africa.
Capacity: 10,000	Capacity: 3,000	Host location in South Africa.

== Group stage ==
The group stage is composed of three groups of four teams each. Group winners and the best runner-up amongst all groups advance to the semi-finals.

- All times are South African Standard Time (UTC+2).

=== Group A ===
Pos	Team	Pld	W	D	L	GF	GA	GD	Pts	Qualification
1	South Africa (H)	3	3	0	0	9	1	+8	9	Advance to knockout stage
2	Botswana	3	1	1	1	2	1	+1	4	
3	Malawi	3	1	0	2	2	8	−6	3	
4	Madagascar	3	0	1	2	1	4	−3	1	

(H) Hosts
12 September 2018
10:00

Botswana	2–0	Malawi
Keleboge 6'; Radikakanyo 78'	Report

Wolfson Stadium, KwaZakele
12 September 2018
15:30

South Africa	2–1	Madagascar
Xesi 7'; Vilakazi 20'	Report	Rasoanandrasana 22' (pen.)

Wolfson Stadium, KwaZakele

14 September 2018
10:00

Madagascar	0–2	Malawi
	Report	Kasenda 18'; Kapanda 81'

Wolfson Stadium, KwaZakele
14 September 2018
15:30

Botswana	0–1	South Africa
	Report	Seoposenwe 90+5'

Wolfson Stadium, KwaZakele

17 September 2018
15:30

South Africa	6–0	Malawi
Motlhalo 10', 88', 89'; Xesi 31', 45'; Mohlakoana 53'	Report

Wolfson Stadium, KwaZakele
17 September 2018
15:30

Botswana	0–0	Madagascar
	Report

Gelvandale Stadium, Port Elizabeth

=== Group B ===
Pos	Team	Pld	W	D	L	GF	GA	GD	Pts	Qualification
1	Zambia	3	3	0	0	6	0	+6	9	Advance to knockout stage
2	Cameroon	3	2	0	1	14	2	+12	6	Advance to knockout stage as best runner-up
3	Mozambique	3	1	0	2	3	12	−9	3	
4	Lesotho	3	0	0	3	1	10	−9	0	

13 September 2018
13:00

Cameroon	8–1	Mozambique
Mbappé 5', 54'; Mpeh 25', 75', 89'; Abena 58'; Meyong 71'; Nkada 85'	Report	Ninika 53'

Wolfson Stadium, KwaZakele
13 September 2018
15:30

Zambia	2–0	Lesotho
Zulu 36'; Banda 57'	Report

Wolfson Stadium, KwaZakele

15 September 2018
10:00

Lesotho	1–2	Mozambique
Maloro 60'	Report	Ninika 47'; Lúcia Leila 72'

Wolfson Stadium, KwaZakele
15 September 2018
15:30

Zambia	1–0	Cameroon
Mweemba 38'	Report

Wolfson Stadium, KwaZakele

18 September 2018
15:00

Zambia	3–0	Mozambique
Nachula 45+2'; Mwakapila 73'; Banda 84'	Report

Wolfson Stadium, KwaZakele
18 September 2018
15:00

Cameroon	6–0	Lesotho
Manbolamo 2'; Ngo 17'; Ngogo Mani 42', 51'; Guylaine 79'; Mbengono 85'	Report

Gelvandale Stadium, Port Elizabeth

=== Group C ===
Pos	Team	Pld	W	D	L	GF	GA	GD	Pts	Qualification
1	Uganda	3	2	1	0	6	4	+2	7	Advance to knockout stage
2	Zimbabwe	3	2	0	1	5	2	+3	6	
3	Namibia	3	1	1	1	4	2	+2	4	
4	Eswatini	3	0	0	3	4	11	−7	0	

Updated to match(es) played on Complate. Source:
12 September 2018
13:00

Eswatini	3–4	Uganda
Sandiswa 62'; Thandizile 78'; Shongwe 90'	Report	Nassuna 3', 82' (pen.); Alupo 32'; Nanziri 45+2'

Wolfson Stadium, KwaZakele
13 September 2018
10:00

Zimbabwe	1–0	Namibia
Nyaumwe 18'	Report

Wolfson Stadium, KwaZakele

14 September 2018
13:00

Zimbabwe	3–0	Eswatini
Nyama 29'; Muzongondi 59'; Nyaumwe 62'	Report

Wolfson Stadium, KwaZakele
15 September 2018
13:00

Namibia	0–0	Uganda
	Report

Wolfson Stadium, KwaZakele

17 September 2018
13:00

Zimbabwe	1–2	Uganda
Makore 90'	Report	Nalukenge 63'; Akiror 79'

Wolfson Stadium, KwaZakele
17 September 2018
13:00

Eswatini	1–4	Namibia
Nkambule 90'	Report	van Wyk 5'; Katuta 7', 34'; Mulunga 43'

Gelvandale Stadium, Port Elizabeth

== Knockout stage ==
=== Semi-finals ===
20 September 2018
13:00

Zambia	0–1	Cameroon
	Report	Ngo 77'

Wolfson Stadium, KwaZakele
20 September 2018
15:30

South Africa	2–0	Uganda
Motlhalo 7'; Seoposenwe 67'	Report

Wolfson Stadium, KwaZakele

=== Bronze medal match ===
21 September 2018
15:00

Zambia	0–1	Uganda
	Report	Akiror 33' (pen.)

Wolfson Stadium, KwaZakele

=== Final ===
22 September 2018
12:00

Cameroon	1–2	South Africa
Ngo 66'	Report	Jane 42', 90'

Wolfson Stadium, KwaZakele

== Statistics ==
=== Goalscorers ===
There were 64 goals scored in 22 matches, for an average of 2.91 goals per match.

4 goals

- (South Africa) Linda Motlhalo

3 goals

- (Cameroon) Christiane Mpeh
- (Cameroon) Genevieve Ngo Mbeleck
- (South Africa) Khanya Xesi

2 goals

- (Cameroon) Raïssa Mbappé
- (Cameroon) Madeleine Ngono Mani
- (Namibia) Iina Katuta
- (South Africa) Refiloe Jane
- (South Africa) Jermaine Seoposenwe
- (Uganda) Tracy Akiror
- (Uganda) Hasifa Nassuna
- (Zambia) Barbra Banda
- (Zimbabwe) Marjory Nyaumwe

1 goal

- (Botswana) Lesego Keleboge
- (Botswana) Lesego Radikakanyo
- (Cameroon) Ninon Abena
- (Cameroon) Éliane Manbolamo
- (Cameroon) Tchadeu Guylaine
- (Cameroon) Catherine Mbengono
- (Cameroon) Charlène Meyong
- (Cameroon) Agnès Nkada
- (Eswatini) Celiwe Nkambule
- (Eswatini) Tenanile Sandiswa
- (Eswatini) Vebile Shongwe
- (Eswatini) Celiwe Thandizile
- (Lesotho) Litseoana Maloro
- (Madagascar) Sarah Rasoanandrasana
- (Malawi) Zainab Kapanda
- (Malawi) Linda Kasenda
- (Mozambique) Lúcia Leila
- (Mozambique) Ninika
- (Namibia) Lovisa Mulunga
- (Namibia) Kylie van Wyk
- (South Africa) Kgalebane Mohlakoana
- (South Africa) Nothando Vilakazi
- (Uganda) Norah Alupo
- (Uganda) Juliet Nalukenge
- (Uganda) Resty Nanziri
- (Zambia) Mary Mwakapila
- (Zambia) Lushomo Mweemba
- (Zambia) Racheal Nachula
- (Zambia) Misozi Zulu
- (Zimbabwe) Rutendo Makore
- (Zimbabwe) Felistas Muzongondi
- (Zimbabwe) Susan Nyama

=== Awards ===
The winners of the tournament awards were:

- Player of the Tournament – (Cameroon) Genevieve Ngo Mbeleck
- Goalkeeper of the Tournament – (Uganda) Ruth Aturo
- Golden Boot – (South Africa) Linda Motlhalo (4 goals)
- Fair Play award – Zambia
