= Cheris Avilia =

Kenyan footballer (born 1989)

Cheris Salano
Personal information
- Full name: Cheris Salano Avilia
- Date of birth: 11 December 1989 (age 36)
- Place of birth: Kenya
- Position: Midfielder

Team information
- Current team: Spedag

Senior career*
Years	Team	Apps	(Gls)
- Spedag

International career
- Kenya
- * Club domestic league appearances and goals

Cheris Salano Avilia (born 11 December 1989), known as Cheris Salano, is a Kenyan footballer who plays for Spedag and the Kenya national team.

She played for Kenya at the 2016 Africa Women Cup of Nations, scoring for Kenya in the match against Mali.

== See also ==
- List of Kenya women's international footballers
