= Madagascar women's national football team =

Madagascar
- Nickname: Barea
- Association: Malagasy Football Federation
- Confederation: CAF (Africa)
- Sub-confederation: COSAFA (Southern Africa)
- Captain: Sophie Farafanirina
- Top scorer: Sophie Farafanirina (16)
- FIFA code: MAD
First colours	Second colours	Third colours

FIFA ranking
- Current: 191 (16 June 2026)
- Highest: 116 (March 2018)
- Lowest: 192 (December 2025)

First international
- Madagascar 1–3 Botswana (Antananarivo, Madagascar; 22 February 2015)

Biggest win
- Madagascar 8–2 Seychelles (Saint-Benoît, Réunion; 6 August 2015)

Biggest defeat
- Zambia 7–1 Madagascar (Bulawayo, Zimbabwe; 17 September 2017)

The Madagascar women's national football team is the FIFA recognised senior women's A team for Madagascar. The team played their first FIFA matches in 2015. They were runner-up to Réunion in the 2015 Indian Ocean Island Games. They have competed in the COSAFA Women's Championship, in which they won a game against Comoros in 2019.

== History ==
In 2005, Zambia was supposed to host the regional COSAFA Women's Championship, with ten countries agreeing to send teams, including South Africa, Zimbabwe, Mozambique, Malawi, Seychelles, Mauritius, Madagascar, Zambia, Botswana, Namibia, Lesotho and Swaziland. The tournament ultimately did not take place. In 2006, there was a FIFA-recognized Malagasy senior A team that held two training sessions a week, though they had not played a single game between 2000 and 2006. A FIFA-recognized Malagasy senior A team existed in 2009.

In 2015 and 2016, the team played several matches, of which four were recognized by FIFA. Two of those were 4–0 wins against Comoros. The other games were in the Indian Ocean Games, where they were runner-up to Réunion. They made the final by winning a game against Mauritius. The team entered the COSAFA Women's Championship three years in a row from 2017 to 2019. After losing all three games in the group stage in 2017, they drew one game in 2018 against Botswana and won one game in 2019 against Comoros.

== Results and fixtures ==
The following is a list of match results in the last 12 months, as well as any future matches that have been scheduled.

Legend

Win Draw Lose Fixture

=== 2026 ===
23 February 2026 2025 COSAFA Women's Championship	Namibia	0–1	Madagascar	Seshego, South Africa
15:00		Report	Razanampiavy 24'	Stadium: Seshego Stadium; Referee: Hloniphile Msezane (South Africa)

25 February 2026 2025 COSAFA Women's Championship	Mozambique	2–0	Madagascar	Polokwane, South Africa
15:00	Banze 31'; Manuel 68'	Report		Stadium: Old Peter Mokaba Stadium; Referee: Mathapelo Morake (Lesotho)

6 June 2026 2028 Olympic Qualification First round	South Sudan	1–1	Madagascar	Juba, South Sudan
15:00 UTC+2	Albert 56'	Report	Razananivo 18'	Stadium: Juba Stadium; Referee: Josephine Nantongo (Uganda)

9 June 2026 2028 Olympic Qualification First round	Madagascar	1–0 (2–1 agg.)	South Sudan	Juba, South Sudan
15:00 UTC+2	Razanarisoa 90+3'	Report		Stadium: Juba Stadium; Referee: Vistoria Shangula (Namibia)

9 October 2026 2028 Olympic qualifying Second round	Madagascar	v	South Africa	Bloemfontein, South Africa
				Stadium: Free State Stadium

13 October 2026 2028 Olympic qualifying Second round	South Africa	v	Madagascar	Bloemfontein, South Africa
				Stadium: Free State Stadium

== Coaching staff ==
=== Current coaching staff ===
As of 15 July 2026

Position	Name
Head coach	(Madagascar) Johary Rakotomalala
Technical Director	
Assistant coach	
Goalkeeping Coach	
Physical coach	
Team Manager	

=== Manager history ===
Name	Period
(Madagascar) Johary Rakotomalala	2015–???
(Madagascar) Theodore Beatrice	2023–2024
(Madagascar) Hortensia Mamihasina	2024–

== Players ==
=== Current squad ===
- The following is the final squad called up for the 2025 COSAFA Women's Championship February 2026.

No.	Pos.	Player	Date of birth (age)	Club
1	GK	Verasantatra Andrianandrasana	30 June 1993 (aged 32)	(Comoros Football Federation) Olympic de Moroni
2	DF	Tsinjo Rasoanantenaina	24 May 2000 (aged 25)	(Malagasy Football Federation) ASJM
3	DF	Aina Rabemaromanga	18 June 2001 (aged 24)	(Malagasy Football Federation) ASKAM AFA
4	DF	Tantely Raheritiana	26 January 2008 (aged 18)	(Malagasy Football Federation) ASKAM AFA
5	DF	Émilienne Solange	8 May 1993 (aged 32)	(Malagasy Football Federation) ASCUF
6	DF	Rina Raharimalala	27 February 1987 (aged 38)	(Malagasy Football Federation) AC Sabnam
7	FW	Aimée Razanampiavy	25 December 1996 (aged 29)	(Comoros Football Federation) United de Domoni
8	FW	Solomampionona Mamonjy	29 May 2002 (aged 23)	(Malagasy Football Federation) Disciples
9	MF	Hanitriniana Nivonirina	20 June 1993 (aged 32)	(Malagasy Football Federation) AC Sabnam
10	MF	Fitiavana Ramanantsoa	5 August 1998 (aged 27)	(Malagasy Football Federation) FFCA
11	MF	Franca Mbolaniana	17 April 2002 (aged 23)	(Malagasy Football Federation) Disciples
12	MF	Helisoa Randrianarivelo	22 July 2000 (aged 25)	(Malagasy Football Federation) AC Sabnam
13	MF	Njaraniaina Randriamialimanantsoa	25 May 2005 (aged 20)	(Malagasy Football Federation) ASKAM AFA
14	MF	Nomenjanahary Raharimampionona	28 November 1998 (aged 27)	(Comoros Football Federation) United de Domoni
15	DF	Anajrasoa Velomanantsolo	7 September 1993 (aged 32)	(Comoros Football Federation) United de Domoni
16	GK	Anastasie Soanarivo	5 February 2005 (aged 21)	(Malagasy Football Federation) ASCUF
17	FW	Andoniaina Rasamison	31 January 1999 (aged 27)	(Malagasy Football Federation) FFCA
18	MF	Angèle Odilicia	29 July 2008 (aged 17)	(Malagasy Football Federation) FC Riziky
19	FW	Marie-Prisca Volanaharinjannahary	7 March 2001 (aged 24)	(Malagasy Football Federation) ASKAM AFA
20	MF	Nasandratriniaina Andriafanomezana	8 October 2007 (aged 18)	(Malagasy Football Federation) YFOMAC
21	MF	Louisa Nambininjanahary	11 June 2005 (aged 20)	(Malagasy Football Federation) Canon
22	GK	Karen Manitriniaina	9 August 2001 (aged 24)	(Malagasy Football Federation) ASKAM AFA
23	MF	Roxina Razafindravola	1 October 2005 (aged 20)	(Malagasy Football Federation) Samba
24	FW	Sanera Ahamadi	4 May 2002 (aged 23)	(French Football Federation) Le Puy Foot 43 Auvergne

=== Recent call-ups ===
The following players have been called up to a Madagascar squad in the past 12 months.

Pos.	Player	Date of birth (age)	Caps	Goals	Club	Latest call-up

=== Previous squads ===
COSAFA Women's Championship

- 2023 COSAFA Women's Championship squad

== Records ==
As of 14 August 2022

*Players in bold are still active, at least at club level.

=== Most capped players ===
#	Player	Year(s)	Caps	Goals

=== Top goalscorers ===
#	Player	Year(s)	Goals	Caps
1	Sophie Farafanirina	2015–Present	16	??
2	Marie Sarah Rasoanandrasana	??–Present	4	??
3	Regina Ramiseheno	2015–??	3	??
3	Aimée Christina Razanampiavy	2015–Present	3	??
4	Nadia Ravaosoloarimalala	2015–??	2	??
4	Noriaty Nirina Tshohy	2015–??	2	??
5	Regina Mamiseheno	2015–??	1	??
5	Marie Raharimalala	2015–Present	1	??
5	Mamy Razafindrabe	??–??	1	??
5	Hanitriniana Nivonirina	??–??	1	??
5	Solomampionona Razananivo	??–??	1	??
5	Julie Solonilaina	??–??	1	??

== Honours ==
=== Regional ===
- **Football at the Indian Ocean Island Games**

Runners-up: 2015

== Competitive record ==
=== FIFA Women's World Cup ===
FIFA Women's World Cup record
Year	Round	Position	Pld	W	D*	L	GS	GA
(China) 1991	did not exist							
(Sweden) 1995	did not exist							
(United States) 1999	did not exist							
(United States) 2003	did not exist							
(China) 2007	did not enter							
(Germany) 2011	did not enter							
(Canada) 2015	did not enter							
(France) 2019	did not enter							
(Australia) (New Zealand) 2023	did not enter							
(Brazil) 2027	did not enter							
**Appearances**	**0/10**	–	–	–	–	–	–	–

=== Olympic Games ===
Summer Olympics record
Year	Round	Position	Pld	W	D*	L	GS	GA
(United States) 1996	did not exist							
(Australia) 2000	did not exist							
(Greece) 2004	did not exist							
(China) 2008	did not enter							
(United Kingdom) 2012	did not enter							
(Brazil) 2016	did not enter							
(Japan) 2020	did not enter							
(France) 2024	did not enter							
(United States) 2028	to be determined							
**Appearances**	**0/7**	–	–	–	–	–	–	–

*Draws include knockout matches decided on penalty kicks.

=== Africa Women Cup of Nations ===
Africa Women Cup of Nations record
Year	Round	Position	Pld	W	D*	L	GS	GA
1991	did not exist							
1995	did not exist							
(Nigeria) 1998	did not exist							
(South Africa) 2000	did not exist							
(Nigeria) 2002	did not exist							
(South Africa) 2004	did not exist							
(Nigeria) 2006	did not enter							
(Equatorial Guinea) 2008	did not enter							
(South Africa) 2010	did not enter							
(Equatorial Guinea) 2012	did not enter							
(Namibia) 2014	did not enter							
(Cameroon) 2016	did not enter							
(Ghana) 2018	did not enter							
2020	did not enter, tournament was later canceled							
(Morocco) 2022	did not enter							
(Morocco) 2024	**Did not enter**							
**Appearances**	**0/12**	–	–	–	–	–	–	–

=== COSAFA Women's Championship ===
COSAFA Women's Championship record
Year	Round	Position	Pld	W	D*	L	GS	GA	GD
(Zimbabwe) 2002	did not exist								
(Zambia) 2006	did not enter								
(Angola) 2008	did not enter								
(Zimbabwe) 2011	did not enter								
(Zimbabwe) 2017	**Group stage**	11th	3	0	0	3	4	17	-13
(South Africa) 2018	**Group stage**	10th	3	0	1	2	1	4	-3
(South Africa) 2019	**Group stage**	8th	3	1	0	2	5	6	-1
(South Africa) 2020	did not enter								
(South Africa) 2021	did not enter								
(South Africa) 2022	did not enter								
(South Africa) 2023	**Group stage**	10th	3	0	0	3	3	8	-5
**Appearances**	**Group stage**	**8th**	**12**	**1**	**1**	**10**	**13**	**35**	**-22**

*Draws include knockout matches decided on penalty kicks.

Sources: COSAFA, Soccerway

== See also ==
- Sport in Madagascar
  - Football in Madagascar
