= Barbourfields Stadium =

Building in Bulawayo, Zimbabwe

Barbourfields (Peter Ndlovu) Stadium
- Emagumeni
- Interactive map of Barbourfields (Peter Ndlovu) Stadium
- Full name: Barbourfields Stadium
- Location: Bulawayo, Zimbabwe
- Coordinates: 20°07′51″S 28°34′11″E
- Owner: Bulawayo City Council
- Capacity: All-seated: 22,995; Standing: 40,000
- Surface: Grass

Tenants
- Highlanders FC; Zimbabwe national football team

Barbourfields Stadium is a multi-purpose stadium located in Barbourfields Suburb in Bulawayo, Zimbabwe. The stadium is currently used mostly for football matches. It is owned by Bulawayo City Council and it is the home of Highlanders F.C., one of the biggest association football clubs in Zimbabwe. Football fans commonly refer to the stadium as "Emagumeni" meaning "our yard" in iSiNdebele. As of 2017, Barbourfields Stadium may be used as homeground to other football teams in and around Bulawayo including Bantu Rovers FC, How Mine FC and Chicken Inn FC, but mostly, when they play big teams.

The stadium consists of four stands including the most famous ones; the Mpilo End (usually for the away fans), and, of course, the Soweto End (for the 'die hard' home fans). It is the third largest stadium in Zimbabwe after the National Sports Stadium and the Rufaro Stadium.

Highlanders FC drew the highest average home attendance in their domestic league in 2016, with an average attendance of 5,614. The previous year, they drew an average home attendance of 7,276 for domestic league games.
