= Misozi Zulu =

Zambian footballer (born 1994)

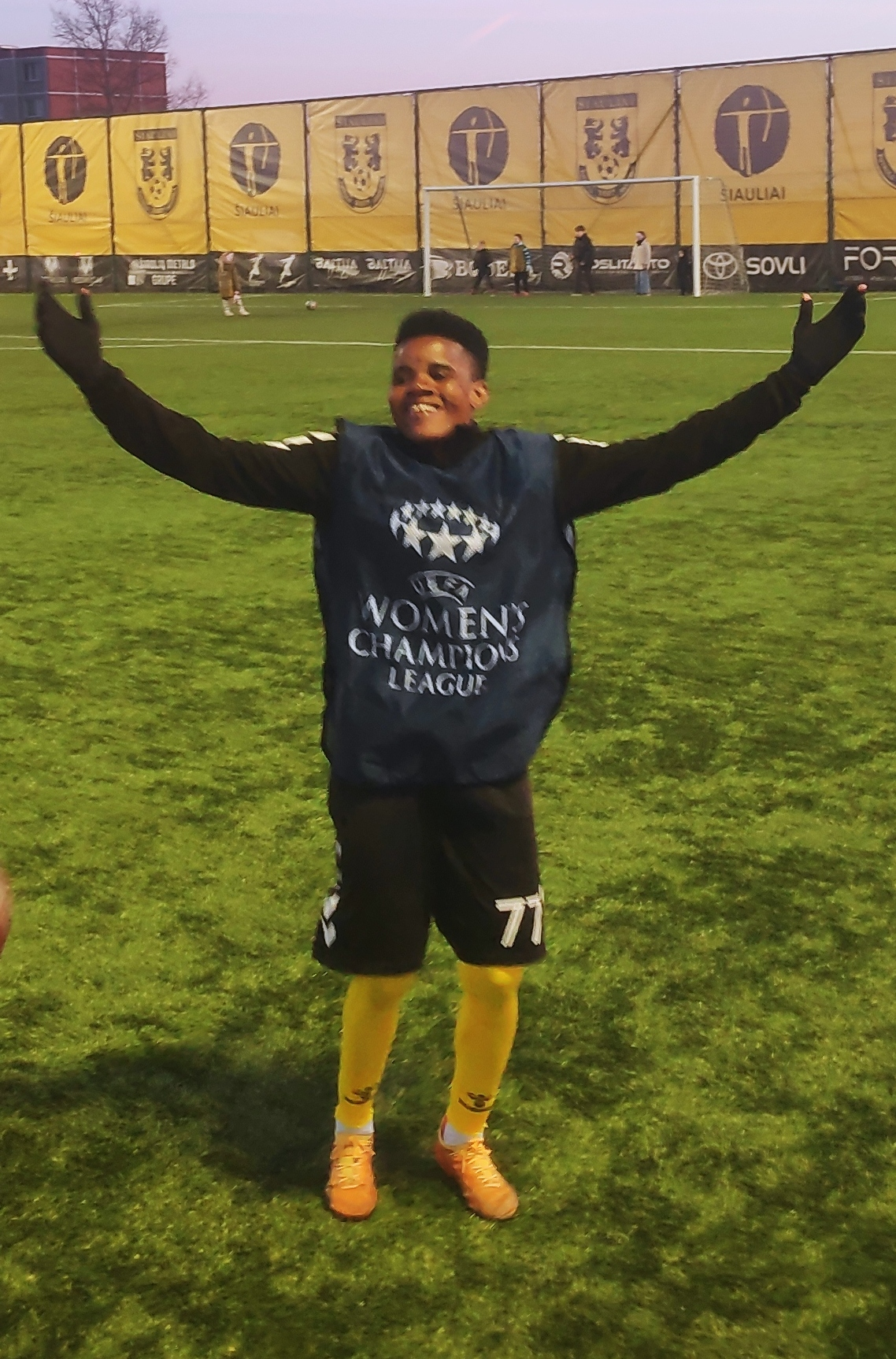

Personal information
- Full name: Misozi Chisha Rachael Zulu
- Date of birth: 11 October 1994 (age 32)
- Place of birth: Lusaka, Zambia
- Position: Midfielder

Team information
- Current team: FC Gintra
- Number: 77

Senior career*
| Years | Team | Apps | (Gls) |
- National Assembly F.C.
| 2019 | BIIK Kazygurt | | |
| 2020–2021 | Green Buffaloes F.C. | | |
| 2021–2025 | Hakkarigücü Spor | 37 | (10) |
| 2026– | FC Gintra | 1 | (0) |

International career
- Zambia
Medal record
Representing Zambia
Women's Africa Cup of Nations
| Third place | 2022 Morocco |
- * Club domestic league appearances and goals as of 5 February 2023

Misozi Chisha Rachael Zulu (born 11 October 1994) is a Zambian footballer who plays as a midfielder for the Turkish Women's Super League club Hakkarigücü Spor and the Zambia women's national team.

== Club career ==
Zulu went to Kazakhstan by July 2019, and joined the Shymkent-based club BIIK Kazygurt on a six-month loan deal. She took part at the 2019–20 UEFA Women's Champions League for the Kazakhi team.

At club level she played for National Assembly F.C. and Green Buffaloes F.C. in Zambia.

By December 2021, she moved to Turkey and joined Hakkarigücü Spor to play in the 2021–22 Turkcell Super League.

=== FC Gintra ===
On 21 March 2026 lithuanian FC Gintra announced about an agreement with Misozi Zulu.

On 22 March 2026 Misozi Zulu made her debut in Moterų A Lyga against FK Transinvest. Gintra won 2–0.

== International career ==
She was a member and captain of the Zambia women's national football team. She was part of the team at the 2014 African Women's Championship.

Zulu was called up to the Zambia squad for the 2022 Women's Africa Cup of Nations, where they finished in third place.

On 3 July 2024, Zulu was called up to the Zambia squad for the 2024 Summer Olympics.

== Honours ==
Zambia

- COSAFA Women's Championship: 2022
