= Dobsonville Stadium =

South African stadium

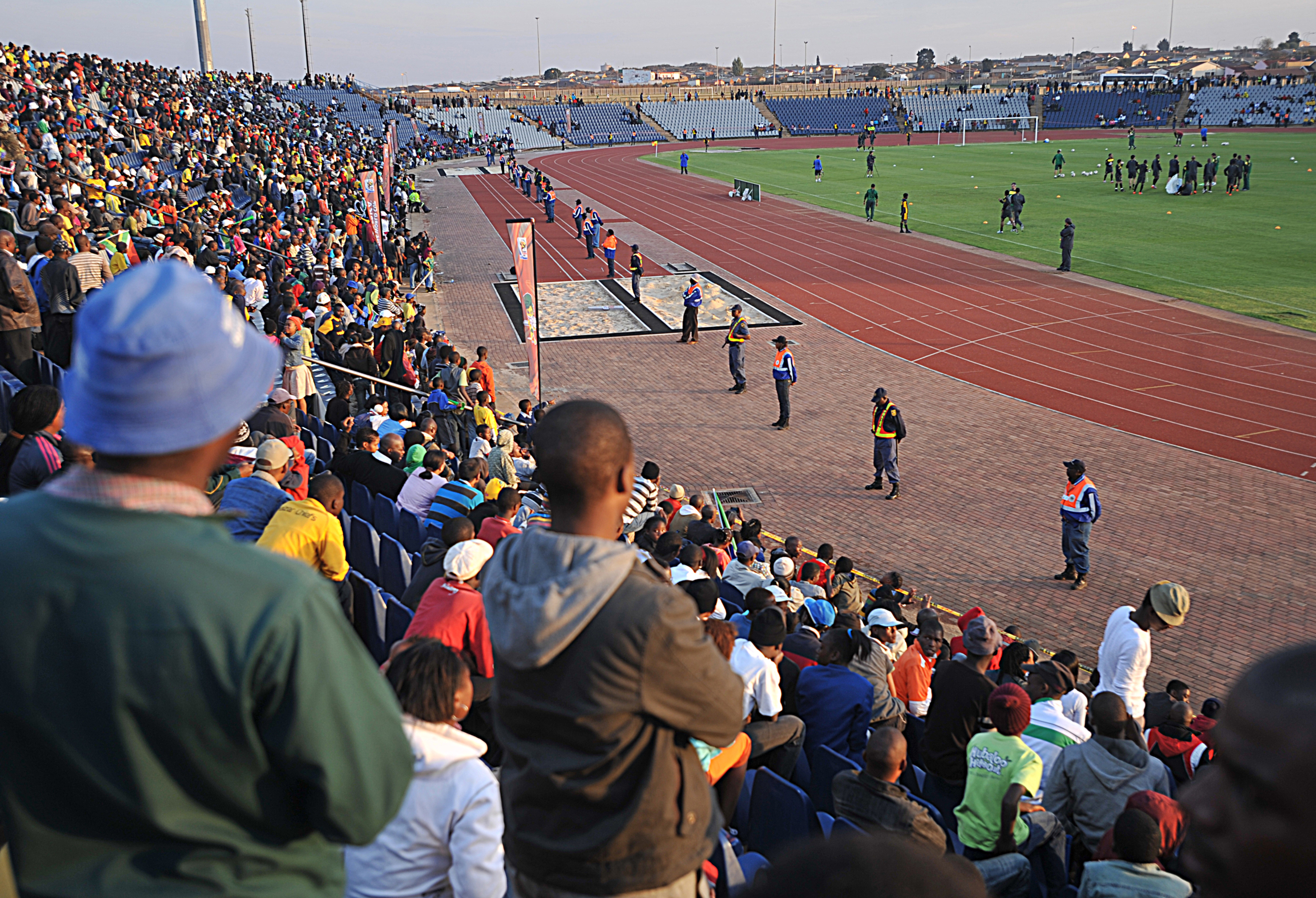
- Interactive map of Dobsonville Stadium
- Former names: Dobsonville Stadium
- Location: off Main Rd (btwn Montlahla and Mojava streets); Dobsonville, Soweto, Johannesburg, South Africa
- Coordinates: 26°13′36″S 27°51′51″E
- Owner: City of Johannesburg
- Operator: Stadium Management SA (SMSA)
- Capacity: 24,000

Construction
- Opened: 1975
- Renovated: 2009
- Cost: R69 million (2009 refurbishment)

The Dobsonville Stadium, formerly Volkswagen Dobsonville Stadium and also referred to as Dobsie Stadium, is a multi-purpose stadium in Soweto, a suburb of Johannesburg, South Africa. The venue is managed by Stadium Management SA (SMSA).

It is mostly used for football matches, but is also equipped with an athletics track. It is the home ground of Moroka Swallows, a football club which played in the Premier Soccer League until relegation at the end of the 2014–15 season. Now it used by Swallows FC as their home ground. It was also utilised as a training field for teams participating in the 2010 FIFA World Cup, after being renovated and upgraded in 2009 to meet FIFA specifications. It also carries one of the best water drainage systems in the country.

Dobsonville Stadium was originally built in 1975 with a capacity of 20,000 and can now accommodate 24,000 spectators, with improved facilities that include a media tribune, a press conference area, improved change rooms, gyms and a main stadium suite along with additional suite areas that can be utilised for corporate events and gatherings.

Dobsonville was established as a playing field in 1957 when people from Roodepoort West were resettled in the area. There were a number of football grounds but the venue off Main Road was the most popular in that period.

While it is always associated with legendary Soweto side, Moroka Swallows, who have the club's memorabilia and history inside the venue - Dobsie Stadium has hosted a number of international class events that include the 2009 African Youth (Under-20) Championship football tournament, the 2010 Gauteng Future Champs as well as a number of South African national football fixtures that include Banyana Banyana (the SA National Women's Football Team) and the SA National Men's Football Team's (Bafana Bafana) international fixture against Mauritius in their 2016 African Nations Championship qualifier in July 2015.
