= Football at the 2016 Summer Olympics – Women's team squads =

The women's football tournament at the 2016 Summer Olympics in Rio de Janeiro was held from 3 to 19 August 2016. The women's tournament was a full international tournament with no restrictions on age. The twelve national teams involved in the tournament were required to register a squad of 18 players, including two goalkeepers. Additionally, teams could name a maximum of four alternate players, numbered from 19 to 22. The alternate list could contain at most three outfielders, as at least one slot was reserved for a goalkeeper. In the event of serious injury during the tournament, an injured player could be replaced by one of the players in the alternate list. Only players in these squads were eligible to take part in the tournament.

The age listed for each player is on 3 August 2016, the first day of the tournament. The numbers of caps and goals listed for each player do not include any matches played after the start of the tournament. The club listed is the club for which the player last played a competitive match prior to the tournament. A flag is included for coaches who are of a different nationality than their own national team.

== Group E ==
=== Brazil ===
Head coach: Vadão

Brazil named a squad of 18 players and 4 alternates for the tournament, which was announced on 12 July 2016.

No.	Pos.	Player	Date of birth (age)	Caps	Goals	Club
1	GK	Bárbara	4 July 1988 (aged 28)	25	0	Unattached
2	DF	Fabiana	4 August 1989 (aged 26)	59	6	(Chinese Football Association) Dalian Quanjian
3	DF	Mônica	21 April 1987 (aged 29)	25	2	(United States Soccer Federation) Orlando Pride
4	DF	Rafaelle	18 June 1991 (aged 25)	8	0	(Chinese Football Association) Changchun Zhuoyue
5	MF	Thaisa	17 December 1988 (aged 27)	29	2	Unattached
6	DF	Tamires	10 October 1987 (aged 28)	35	3	(Danish Football Association) Fortuna Hjørring
7	FW	Debinha	20 October 1991 (aged 24)	6	4	(Chinese Football Association) Dalian Quanjian
8	MF	Formiga	3 March 1978 (aged 38)	138	20	Unattached
9	FW	Andressa Alves	10 November 1992 (aged 23)	39	10	(Royal Spanish Football Federation) FC Barcelona
10	MF	Marta (captain)	19 February 1986 (aged 30)	95	92	(Swedish Football Association) FC Rosengård
11	FW	Cristiane	15 May 1985 (aged 31)	109	75	(French Football Federation) Paris Saint-Germain
12	DF	Poliana	6 February 1991 (aged 25)	34	2	(United States Soccer Federation) Houston Dash
13	DF	Érika	4 February 1988 (aged 28)	49	10	(French Football Federation) Paris Saint-Germain
14	DF	Bruna	16 October 1985 (aged 30)	4	0	Unattached
15	FW	Raquel	21 March 1991 (aged 25)	22	4	(Chinese Football Association) Changchun Zhuoyue
16	FW	Beatriz	17 December 1993 (aged 22)	18	1	(Korea Football Association) Steel Red Angels
17	MF	Andressinha	1 May 1995 (aged 21)	21	7	(United States Soccer Federation) Houston Dash
18	GK	Aline	15 April 1989 (aged 27)	0	0	Unattached

Unenrolled alternate players
No.	Pos.	Player	Date of birth (age)	Caps	Goals	Club
19–21	DF	Camila	10 October 1994 (aged 21)			
19–21	FW	Thaís Guedes	20 January 1993 (aged 23)			
19–21	MF	Darlene	11 January 1990 (aged 26)			
22	GK	Luciana	24 July 1987 (aged 29)			

=== China PR ===
Head coach: (France) Bruno Bini

China PR named a squad of 18 players and 4 alternates for the tournament, which was announced on 7 July 2016. Prior to the tournament, Ren Guixin withdrew injured and was replaced on 18 July 2016 by Li Ying, who was initially selected as an alternate player. Wang Yan subsequently filled the vacant alternate spot.

No.	Pos.	Player	Date of birth (age)	Caps	Goals	Club
1	GK	Zhao Lina	18 September 1991 (aged 24)	31	0	(Chinese Football Association) Shanghai Yongbai
2	DF	Liu Shanshan	16 March 1992 (aged 24)	51	0	(Chinese Football Association) Changchun Zhuoyue
3	DF	Xue Jiao	30 January 1993 (aged 23)	26	0	(Chinese Football Association) Dalian Quanjian
4	DF	Gao Chen	11 August 1992 (aged 23)	2	0	(Chinese Football Association) Dalian Quanjian
5	DF	Wu Haiyan	26 February 1993 (aged 23)	63	0	(Chinese Football Association) Shandong Huangming
6	DF	Li Dongna (captain)	6 December 1988 (aged 27)	81	6	(Chinese Football Association) Dalian Quanjian
7	MF	Li Ying	7 January 1993 (aged 23)	80	13	(Chinese Football Association) Shandong Huangming
8	MF	Tan Ruyin	17 July 1994 (aged 22)	39	0	(Chinese Football Association) Changchun Zhuoyue
9	FW	Ma Xiaoxu	5 June 1988 (aged 28)	147	61	(Chinese Football Association) Dalian Quanjian
10	FW	Yang Li	31 January 1991 (aged 25)	33	17	(Chinese Football Association) Jiangsu Suning
11	FW	Wang Shanshan	27 January 1990 (aged 26)	70	9	(Chinese Football Association) Tianjin Huisen
12	FW	Wang Shuang	23 January 1995 (aged 21)	44	6	(Chinese Football Association) Dalian Quanjian
13	MF	Pang Fengyue	19 January 1989 (aged 27)	80	6	(Chinese Football Association) Dalian Quanjian
14	DF	Zhao Rong	2 August 1991 (aged 25)	52	0	(Chinese Football Association) Changchun Zhuoyue
15	MF	Zhang Rui	17 January 1989 (aged 27)	91	17	(Chinese Football Association) People's Liberation Army
16	MF	Yang Man	2 November 1995 (aged 20)	16	1	(Chinese Football Association) Shandong Ladies
17	FW	Gu Yasha	28 November 1990 (aged 25)	118	10	(Chinese Football Association) Beijing BG
18	GK	Zhang Yue	30 September 1990 (aged 25)	49	0	(Chinese Football Association) Beijing BG

Unenrolled alternate players
No.	Pos.	Player	Date of birth (age)	Caps	Goals	Club
19	MF	Han Peng	20 December 1989 (aged 26)			
20	MF	Wang Yan	22 August 1991 (aged 24)			
21	MF	Lou Jiahui	26 May 1991 (aged 25)			
22	GK	Bi Xiaolin	18 September 1989 (aged 26)			

=== South Africa ===
Head coach: (Netherlands) Vera Pauw

South Africa named a squad of 18 players and 4 alternates for the tournament, which was announced on 14 July 2016. During the tournament, Thembi Kgatlana replaced Shiwe Nogwanya on 6 August 2016 due to injury.

No.	Pos.	Player	Date of birth (age)	Caps	Goals	Club
1	GK	Roxanne Barker	6 May 1991 (aged 25)	28	0	(Football Association of Iceland) Knattspyrnufélag Akureyrar
2	DF	Lebogang Ramalepe	3 December 1991 (aged 24)	27	1	(South African Football Association) MaIndies
3	DF	Nothando Vilakazi	28 October 1988 (aged 27)	86	5	(South African Football Association) Palace Super Falcons
4	DF	Noko Matlou	30 September 1985 (aged 30)	124	63	(South African Football Association) MaIndies
5	DF	Janine van Wyk (captain)	17 April 1987 (aged 29)	131	11	(South African Football Association) JVW
6	MF	Mamello Makhabane	24 February 1988 (aged 28)	71	18	(South African Football Association) JVW
7	MF	Stephanie Malherbe	5 April 1996 (aged 20)	7	0	(United States Soccer Federation) Texas A&M University
8	MF	Robyn Moodaly	16 June 1994 (aged 22)	14	2	(United States Soccer Federation) University of Northwestern Ohio
9	MF	Amanda Dlamini	22 July 1988 (aged 28)	100	24	(South African Football Association) University of Johannesburg
10	MF	Linda Motlhalo	1 July 1998 (aged 18)	8	3	(Slovak Football Association) FKM Nové Zámky
11	FW	Shiwe Nogwanya	7 March 1994 (aged 22)	28	4	(South African Football Association) Bloemfontein Celtic
12	FW	Jermaine Seoposenwe	12 October 1993 (aged 22)	41	10	(United States Soccer Federation) Samford University
13	DF	Bambanani Mbane	12 March 1990 (aged 26)	2	0	(South African Football Association) Bloemfontein Celtic
14	FW	Sanah Mollo	30 January 1987 (aged 29)	69	21	(South African Football Association) Mamelodi Sundowns
15	MF	Refiloe Jane	4 August 1992 (aged 23)	62	5	(South African Football Association) Vaal University of Technology
16	GK	Andile Dlamini	2 September 1992 (aged 23)	19	0	(South African Football Association) Mamelodi Sundowns
17	MF	Leandra Smeda	22 July 1989 (aged 27)	60	13	(South African Football Association) University of the Western Cape
18	MF	Mpumi Nyandeni	19 August 1987 (aged 28)	125	38	(South African Football Association) JVW
20	FW	Thembi Kgatlana	2 May 1996 (aged 20)	0	0	(South African Football Association) University of the Western Cape

Unenrolled alternate players
No.	Pos.	Player	Date of birth (age)	Caps	Goals	Club
19	DF	Nomathemba Ntsibande	19 April 1986 (aged 30)			
21	FW	Chantelle Esau	14 December 1990 (aged 25)			
22	GK	Kaylin Swart	30 September 1994 (aged 21)			

=== Sweden ===
Head coach: Pia Sundhage

Sweden named a squad of 18 players and 4 alternates for the tournament, which was announced on 28 June 2016. During the tournament, Pauline Hammarlund replaced Fridolina Rolfö on 14 August 2016 due to injury.

No.	Pos.	Player	Date of birth (age)	Caps	Goals	Club
1	GK	Hedvig Lindahl	29 April 1983 (aged 33)	122	0	(The Football Association) Chelsea
2	DF	Jonna Andersson	2 January 1993 (aged 23)	4	0	(Swedish Football Association) Linköpings FC
3	DF	Linda Sembrant	15 May 1987 (aged 29)	69	7	(French Football Federation) Montpellier HSC
4	DF	Emma Berglund	19 December 1988 (aged 27)	44	1	(Swedish Football Association) FC Rosengård
5	DF	Nilla Fischer	2 August 1984 (aged 32)	144	20	(German Football Association) VfL Wolfsburg
6	DF	Magdalena Eriksson	8 September 1993 (aged 22)	11	1	(Swedish Football Association) Linköpings FC
7	MF	Lisa Dahlkvist	6 February 1987 (aged 29)	110	11	(Swedish Football Association) KIF Örebro
8	FW	Lotta Schelin (co-captain)	27 February 1984 (aged 32)	165	84	(Swedish Football Association) FC Rosengård
9	MF	Kosovare Asllani	29 July 1989 (aged 27)	83	25	(The Football Association) Manchester City
10	FW	Sofia Jakobsson	23 April 1990 (aged 26)	71	12	(French Football Federation) Montpellier HSC
11	FW	Stina Blackstenius	5 February 1996 (aged 20)	8	1	(Swedish Football Association) Linköpings FC
12	FW	Olivia Schough	11 March 1991 (aged 25)	36	5	(Swedish Football Association) Eskilstuna United
13	FW	Fridolina Rolfö	24 November 1993 (aged 22)	9	4	(Swedish Football Association) Linköpings FC
14	MF	Emilia Appelqvist	11 February 1990 (aged 26)	12	1	(Swedish Football Association) Djurgårdens IF
15	DF	Jessica Samuelsson	30 January 1992 (aged 24)	32	0	(Swedish Football Association) Linköpings FC
16	MF	Elin Rubensson	11 May 1993 (aged 23)	31	0	(Swedish Football Association) Kopparbergs/Göteborg FC
17	MF	Caroline Seger (co-captain)	19 March 1985 (aged 31)	151	23	(French Football Federation) Olympique Lyon
18	GK	Hilda Carlén	13 August 1991 (aged 24)	2	0	(Swedish Football Association) Piteå IF
19	FW	Pauline Hammarlund	7 May 1994 (aged 22)	6	3	(Swedish Football Association) Kopparbergs/Göteborg FC

Unenrolled alternate players
No.	Pos.	Player	Date of birth (age)	Caps	Goals	Club
20–21	DF	Amanda Ilestedt	17 January 1993 (aged 23)			
20–21	MF	Hanne Gråhns	29 August 1992 (aged 23)			
22	GK	Emelie Lundberg	10 March 1993 (aged 23)			

== Group F ==
=== Australia ===
Head coach: Alen Stajcic

Australia named a squad of 18 players and 4 alternates for the tournament, which was announced on 4 July 2016.

No.	Pos.	Player	Date of birth (age)	Caps	Goals	Club
1	GK	Lydia Williams	13 May 1988 (aged 28)	53	0	(United States Soccer Federation) Houston Dash
2	FW	Larissa Crummer	10 January 1996 (aged 20)	10	1	(Football Australia) Melbourne City
3	MF	Katrina Gorry	13 August 1992 (aged 23)	44	13	(Football Australia) Brisbane Roar
4	DF	Clare Polkinghorne (co-captain)	1 February 1989 (aged 27)	87	6	(Football Australia) Brisbane Roar
5	DF	Laura Alleway	28 November 1989 (aged 26)	44	2	(United States Soccer Federation) Orlando Pride
6	MF	Chloe Logarzo	22 December 1994 (aged 21)	8	0	(Swedish Football Association) Eskilstuna United
7	DF	Steph Catley	26 January 1994 (aged 22)	49	2	(United States Soccer Federation) Orlando Pride
8	MF	Elise Kellond-Knight	10 August 1990 (aged 25)	71	1	(German Football Association) 1. FFC Turbine Potsdam
9	MF	Caitlin Foord	11 November 1994 (aged 21)	45	7	(Football Australia) Perth Glory
10	MF	Emily van Egmond	12 July 1993 (aged 23)	53	14	(German Football Association) 1. FFC Frankfurt
11	FW	Lisa De Vanna (co-captain)	14 November 1984 (aged 31)	112	39	(Football Australia) Melbourne City
12	DF	Ellie Carpenter	28 April 2000 (aged 16)	3	0	(Football Australia) Western Sydney Wanderers
13	MF	Tameka Butt	16 June 1991 (aged 25)	55	7	(Swedish Football Association) Mallbacken
14	DF	Alanna Kennedy	21 January 1995 (aged 21)	43	1	(United States Soccer Federation) Western New York Flash
15	FW	Sam Kerr	10 September 1993 (aged 22)	43	7	(United States Soccer Federation) Sky Blue FC
16	FW	Michelle Heyman	4 July 1988 (aged 28)	48	18	(Football Australia) Canberra United
17	FW	Kyah Simon	25 June 1991 (aged 25)	65	20	(United States Soccer Federation) Boston Breakers
18	GK	Mackenzie Arnold	25 February 1994 (aged 22)	10	0	(Football Australia) Perth Glory

Unenrolled alternate players
No.	Pos.	Player	Date of birth (age)	Caps	Goals	Club
19–21	DF	Caitlin Cooper	12 February 1988 (aged 28)			
19–21	MF	Aivi Luik	18 March 1985 (aged 31)			
19–21	FW	Emily Gielnik	13 May 1992 (aged 24)			
22	GK	Casey Dumont	25 January 1992 (aged 24)			

=== Canada ===
Head coach: (United Kingdom) John Herdman

Canada named a squad of 18 players and 4 alternates for the tournament, which was announced on 20 June 2016.

No.	Pos.	Player	Date of birth (age)	Caps	Goals	Club
1	GK	Stephanie Labbé	10 October 1986 (aged 29)	34	0	(United States Soccer Federation) Washington Spirit
2	DF	Allysha Chapman	25 January 1989 (aged 27)	32	1	(United States Soccer Federation) Houston Dash
3	DF	Kadeisha Buchanan	5 November 1995 (aged 20)	60	3	(United States Soccer Federation) West Virginia University
4	DF	Shelina Zadorsky	24 August 1992 (aged 23)	20	3	(United States Soccer Federation) Washington Spirit
5	MF	Quinn (Note: Then known as Rebecca Quinn)	11 August 1995 (aged 20)	25	3	(United States Soccer Federation) Duke University
6	FW	Deanne Rose	3 March 1999 (aged 17)	12	3	(Canadian Soccer Association) Scarborough GS United
7	DF	Rhian Wilkinson	12 May 1982 (aged 34)	175	7	Unattached
8	MF	Diana Matheson	6 April 1984 (aged 32)	183	17	(United States Soccer Federation) Washington Spirit
9	DF	Josée Bélanger	14 May 1986 (aged 30)	50	7	(United States Soccer Federation) Orlando Pride
10	DF	Ashley Lawrence	11 June 1995 (aged 21)	42	4	(United States Soccer Federation) West Virginia University
11	MF	Desiree Scott	31 July 1987 (aged 29)	110	0	(United States Soccer Federation) FC Kansas City
12	FW	Christine Sinclair (captain)	12 June 1983 (aged 33)	243	162	(United States Soccer Federation) Portland Thorns
13	MF	Sophie Schmidt	28 June 1988 (aged 28)	149	16	(German Football Association) 1. FFC Frankfurt
14	FW	Melissa Tancredi	27 December 1981 (aged 34)	118	25	(Swedish Football Association) KIF Örebro
15	FW	Nichelle Prince	19 February 1995 (aged 21)	16	6	(United States Soccer Federation) Ohio State University
16	FW	Janine Beckie	20 August 1994 (aged 21)	23	10	(United States Soccer Federation) Houston Dash
17	MF	Jessie Fleming	11 March 1998 (aged 18)	33	3	(United States Soccer Federation) University of California, Los Angeles
18	GK	Sabrina D'Angelo	11 May 1993 (aged 23)	2	0	(United States Soccer Federation) Western New York Flash

Unenrolled alternate players
No.	Pos.	Player	Date of birth (age)	Caps	Goals	Club
19	FW	Gabrielle Carle	12 October 1998 (aged 17)			
20	DF	Marie-Ève Nault	16 February 1982 (aged 34)			
21	MF	Kaylyn Kyle	6 October 1988 (aged 27)			
22	GK	Kailen Sheridan	16 July 1995 (aged 21)			

=== Germany ===
Head coach: Silvia Neid

Germany named a squad of 18 players and 4 alternates for the tournament, which was announced on 15 July 2016. During the tournament, Svenja Huth replaced Simone Laudehr on 11 August 2016 due to injury.

No.	Pos.	Player	Date of birth (age)	Caps	Goals	Club
1	GK	Almuth Schult	9 February 1991 (aged 25)	28	0	(German Football Association) VfL Wolfsburg
2	DF	Josephine Henning	8 September 1989 (aged 26)	28	0	(The Football Association) Arsenal
3	DF	Saskia Bartusiak (captain)	9 September 1982 (aged 33)	94	1	(German Football Association) 1. FFC Frankfurt
4	DF	Leonie Maier	29 September 1992 (aged 23)	40	6	(German Football Association) Bayern Munich
5	DF	Annike Krahn	1 July 1985 (aged 31)	130	5	(German Football Association) Bayer Leverkusen
6	MF	Simone Laudehr	12 July 1986 (aged 30)	97	26	(German Football Association) Bayern Munich
7	MF	Melanie Behringer	18 November 1985 (aged 30)	116	29	(German Football Association) Bayern Munich
8	MF	Lena Goeßling	8 March 1986 (aged 30)	86	10	(German Football Association) VfL Wolfsburg
9	FW	Alexandra Popp	6 April 1991 (aged 25)	67	33	(German Football Association) VfL Wolfsburg
10	FW	Dzsenifer Marozsán	18 April 1992 (aged 24)	59	27	(French Football Federation) Olympique Lyon
11	FW	Anja Mittag	16 May 1985 (aged 31)	137	42	(French Football Federation) Paris Saint-Germain
12	DF	Tabea Kemme	14 December 1991 (aged 24)	28	1	(German Football Association) Turbine Potsdam
13	MF	Sara Däbritz	15 February 1995 (aged 21)	30	4	(German Football Association) Bayern Munich
14	DF	Babett Peter	12 May 1988 (aged 28)	96	5	(German Football Association) VfL Wolfsburg
15	FW	Mandy Islacker	8 August 1988 (aged 27)	7	2	(German Football Association) 1. FFC Frankfurt
16	MF	Melanie Leupolz	14 April 1994 (aged 22)	41	7	(German Football Association) Bayern Munich
17	MF	Isabel Kerschowski	22 January 1988 (aged 28)	7	3	(German Football Association) VfL Wolfsburg
18	GK	Laura Benkarth	14 October 1992 (aged 23)	2	0	(German Football Association) SC Freiburg
19	MF	Svenja Huth	25 January 1991 (aged 25)	20	0	(German Football Association) Turbine Potsdam

Unenrolled alternate players
No.	Pos.	Player	Date of birth (age)	Caps	Goals	Club
20	MF	Lina Magull	15 August 1994 (aged 21)			
21	DF	Kathrin Hendrich	6 April 1992 (aged 24)			
22	GK	Lisa Weiß	29 October 1987 (aged 28)			

=== Zimbabwe ===
Head coach: Shadreck Mlauzi

Zimbabwe named a squad of 18 players and 4 alternates for the tournament, which was announced on 22 July 2016.

No.	Pos.	Player	Date of birth (age)	Caps	Goals	Club
1	GK	Chido Dzingirai	25 October 1991 (aged 24)			(Zimbabwe Football Association) Flame Lily Queens F.C.
2	DF	Lynett Mutokuto	1 September 1988 (aged 27)			(Zimbabwe Football Association) Black Rhinos F.C.
3	DF	Shiela Makoto	14 January 1990 (aged 26)			(Zimbabwe Football Association) Blue Swallows Queens F.C.
4	DF	Nobuhle Majika	9 May 1991 (aged 25)			(Zimbabwe Football Association) Inline Academy F.C.
5	MF	Emmaculate Msipa	7 June 1992 (aged 24)			(Zimbabwe Football Association) Black Rhinos F.C.
6	MF	Talent Mandaza	11 December 1985 (aged 30)			(Zimbabwe Football Association) Black Rhinos F.C.
7	FW	Rudo Neshamba	10 February 1992 (aged 24)			(Zimbabwe Football Association) Weerams F.C.
8	MF	Rejoice Kapfumvuti	18 November 1991 (aged 24)			(Zimbabwe Football Association) Inline Academy F.C.
9	FW	Samkelisiwe Zulu	14 April 1990 (aged 26)			(Zimbabwe Football Association) Flame Lily Queens F.C.
10	MF	Mavis Chirandu	15 January 1995 (aged 21)			(Zimbabwe Football Association) Weerams F.C.
11	MF	Daisy Kaitano	20 September 1993 (aged 22)			(Zimbabwe Football Association) Black Rhinos F.C.
12	MF	Marjory Nyaumwe	10 July 1987 (aged 29)			(Zimbabwe Football Association) Flame Lily Queens F.C.
13	FW	Erina Jeke	16 September 1990 (aged 25)			(Zimbabwe Football Association) Flame Lily Queens F.C.
14	DF	Eunice Chibanda	26 March 1993 (aged 23)			(Zimbabwe Football Association) Black Rhinos F.C.
15	FW	Rutendo Makore	30 September 1992 (aged 23)			(Zimbabwe Football Association) Black Rhinos F.C.
16	GK	Lindiwe Magwede	1 December 1991 (aged 24)			(Zimbabwe Football Association) Cyclone Stars F.C.
17	FW	Kudakwashe Basopo	18 July 1990 (aged 26)			(Zimbabwe Football Association) Black Rhinos F.C.
18	FW	Felistas Muzongondi (captain)	22 March 1986 (aged 30)			(Zimbabwe Football Association) Mwenezana F.C.

Unenrolled alternate players
No.	Pos.	Player	Date of birth (age)	Caps	Goals	Club
19	DF	Danai Bhobho	1 December 1992 (aged 23)			
20	DF	Ruvimbo Mutyavaviri	8 December 1986 (aged 29)			
21	DF	Nobukhosi Ncube	17 February 1993 (aged 23)			
22	GK	Vanessa Lunga	16 June 1994 (aged 22)			

== Group G ==
=== Colombia ===
Head coach: Fabián Taborda

Colombia named a squad of 18 players and 4 alternates for the tournament, which was announced on 14 July 2016.

No.	Pos.	Player	Date of birth (age)	Caps	Goals	Club
1	GK	Catalina Pérez	8 November 1994 (aged 21)	5	0	(United States Soccer Federation) University of Miami
2	MF	Carolina Arbeláez	8 March 1995 (aged 21)	1	0	(Colombian Football Federation) Formas Íntimas
3	MF	Natalia Gaitán (captain)	3 April 1991 (aged 25)	39	4	(Royal Spanish Football Federation) Valencia CF
4	MF	Diana Ospina	3 March 1989 (aged 27)	33	3	(Colombian Football Federation) Formas Íntimas
5	DF	Isabella Echeverri	16 June 1994 (aged 22)	15	1	(United States Soccer Federation) University of Toledo
6	DF	Liana Salazar	16 September 1992 (aged 23)	13	0	(Colombian Football Federation) Futuro Soccer
7	FW	Ingrid Vidal	22 April 1991 (aged 25)	54	11	(Colombian Football Federation) CD Palmiranas
8	DF	Mildrey Pineda	1 October 1989 (aged 26)	25	2	(Colombian Football Federation) CD Palmiranas
9	DF	Oriánica Velásquez	1 August 1989 (aged 27)	41	2	(Colombian Football Federation) Club Gol Star
10	MF	Leicy Santos	16 May 1996 (aged 20)	15	2	(Colombian Football Federation) Club Gol Star
11	MF	Catalina Usme	25 December 1989 (aged 26)	44	20	(Colombian Football Federation) Formas Íntimas
12	FW	Nicole Regnier	28 February 1995 (aged 21)	1	0	(Royal Spanish Football Federation) Rayo Vallecano
13	DF	Ángela Clavijo	1 September 1993 (aged 22)	19	0	(Colombian Football Federation) Club Kamatsa
14	DF	Nataly Arias	2 April 1986 (aged 30)	58	6	(Colombian Football Federation) Formas Íntimas
15	MF	Tatiana Ariza	21 February 1991 (aged 25)	38	8	(United States Soccer Federation) Houston Aces
16	FW	Lady Andrade	10 January 1992 (aged 24)	45	9	(United States Soccer Federation) Western New York Flash
17	DF	Carolina Arias	2 September 1990 (aged 25)	42	0	(Colombian Football Federation) Orsomarso S.C.
18	GK	Sandra Sepúlveda	3 March 1988 (aged 28)	39	0	(Israel Football Association) F.C. Kiryat Gat

Unenrolled alternate players
No.	Pos.	Player	Date of birth (age)	Caps	Goals	Club
19–21	FW	Melissa Ortiz	24 January 1990 (aged 26)			
19–21	FW	Yisela Cuesta	27 September 1991 (aged 24)			
19–21	FW	Leidy Asprilla	18 April 1997 (aged 19)			
22	GK	Stefany Castaño	11 January 1994 (aged 22)			

=== France ===
Head coach: Philippe Bergeroo

France named a squad of 18 players and 4 alternates for the tournament, which was announced on 7 July 2016. Prior to the tournament, Laura Georges withdrew injured and was replaced on 18 July 2016 by Sakina Karchaoui, who was initially selected as an alternate player. Sandie Toletti subsequently filled the vacant alternate spot.

No.	Pos.	Player	Date of birth (age)	Caps	Goals	Club
1	GK	Méline Gérard	30 May 1990 (aged 26)	4	0	(French Football Federation) Olympique Lyon
2	DF	Griedge Mbock Bathy	26 February 1995 (aged 21)	9	0	(French Football Federation) Olympique Lyon
3	DF	Wendie Renard (captain)	20 July 1990 (aged 26)	71	17	(French Football Federation) Olympique Lyon
4	DF	Sakina Karchaoui	26 January 1996 (aged 20)	1	0	(French Football Federation) Montpellier HSC
5	DF	Sabrina Delannoy	18 May 1986 (aged 30)	26	2	(French Football Federation) Paris Saint-Germain
6	MF	Amandine Henry	28 September 1989 (aged 26)	48	6	(United States Soccer Federation) Portland Thorns
7	DF	Amel Majri	25 January 1993 (aged 23)	20	3	(French Football Federation) Olympique Lyon
8	DF	Jessica Houara	29 September 1987 (aged 28)	41	3	(French Football Federation) Olympique Lyon
9	FW	Eugénie Le Sommer	18 May 1989 (aged 27)	116	52	(French Football Federation) Olympique Lyon
10	MF	Camille Abily	5 December 1984 (aged 31)	145	29	(French Football Federation) Olympique Lyon
11	MF	Claire Lavogez	18 June 1994 (aged 22)	13	1	(French Football Federation) Olympique Lyon
12	FW	Élodie Thomis	13 August 1986 (aged 29)	116	31	(French Football Federation) Olympique Lyon
13	FW	Kadidiatou Diani	1 April 1995 (aged 21)	5	1	(French Football Federation) FCF Juvisy
14	MF	Louisa Cadamuro	23 January 1987 (aged 29)	125	32	(French Football Federation) Olympique Lyon
15	MF	Élise Bussaglia	24 September 1985 (aged 30)	143	26	(German Football Association) VfL Wolfsburg
16	GK	Sarah Bouhaddi	17 October 1986 (aged 29)	93	0	(French Football Federation) Olympique Lyon
17	MF	Kheira Hamraoui	13 January 1990 (aged 26)	22	1	(French Football Federation) Olympique Lyon
18	FW	Marie-Laure Delie	29 January 1988 (aged 28)	90	62	(French Football Federation) Paris Saint-Germain

Unenrolled alternate players
No.	Pos.	Player	Date of birth (age)	Caps	Goals	Club
19–21	MF	Kenza Dali	31 July 1991 (aged 25)			
19–21	FW	Clarisse Le Bihan	14 December 1994 (aged 21)			
19–21	MF	Sandie Toletti	13 July 1995 (aged 21)			
22	GK	Laëtitia Philippe	30 April 1991 (aged 25)			

=== New Zealand ===
Head coach: (United Kingdom) Tony Readings

New Zealand named a squad of 18 players and 4 alternates for the tournament, which was announced on 4 July 2016.

No.	Pos.	Player	Date of birth (age)	Caps	Goals	Club
1	GK	Erin Nayler	17 April 1992 (aged 24)	40	0	(New Zealand Football) Norwest United
2	DF	Ria Percival	7 December 1989 (aged 26)	116	11	(Swiss Football Association) FC Basel
3	DF	Anna Green	20 August 1990 (aged 25)	60	7	(Swedish Football Association) Mallbacken
4	MF	Katie Duncan	1 February 1988 (aged 28)	115	1	(Swiss Football Association) FC Zürich
5	DF	Abby Erceg (captain)	20 November 1989 (aged 26)	126	6	(United States Soccer Federation) Western New York Flash
6	DF	Rebekah Stott	17 June 1993 (aged 23)	49	4	(New Zealand Football) Claudelands Rovers
7	DF	Ali Riley	30 October 1987 (aged 28)	101	1	(Swedish Football Association) FC Rosengård
8	FW	Jasmine Pereira	20 July 1996 (aged 20)	18	0	(New Zealand Football) Three Kings United
9	FW	Amber Hearn	28 November 1984 (aged 31)	112	50	(German Football Association) USV Jena
10	FW	Sarah Gregorius	6 August 1987 (aged 28)	78	24	(Japan Football Association) Speranza FC Osaka-Takatsuki
11	MF	Kirsty Yallop	4 November 1986 (aged 29)	99	12	(Swedish Football Association) Mallbacken
12	MF	Betsy Hassett	4 August 1990 (aged 25)	91	8	(German Football Association) Werder Bremen
13	FW	Rosie White	6 June 1993 (aged 23)	81	14	(The Football Association) Liverpool
14	MF	Katie Bowen	15 April 1994 (aged 22)	37	1	(United States Soccer Federation) FC Kansas City
15	DF	Meikayla Moore	4 June 1996 (aged 20)	14	0	(New Zealand Football) Cashmere Technical
16	MF	Annalie Longo	1 July 1991 (aged 25)	91	8	(New Zealand Football) Cashmere Technical
17	FW	Hannah Wilkinson	28 May 1992 (aged 24)	74	23	(United States Soccer Federation) University of Tennessee
18	GK	Rebecca Rolls	22 August 1975 (aged 40)	22	0	(New Zealand Football) Three Kings United

Unenrolled alternate players
No.	Pos.	Player	Date of birth (age)	Caps	Goals	Club
19	DF	C. J. Bott	22 April 1995 (aged 21)			
20	MF	Daisy Cleverley	30 April 1997 (aged 19)			
21	FW	Paige Satchell	13 April 1998 (aged 18)			
22	GK	Victoria Esson	6 March 1991 (aged 25)			

=== United States ===
Head coach: Jill Ellis

The United States named a squad of 18 players and 4 alternates for the tournament, which was announced on 12 July 2016.

No.	Pos.	Player	Date of birth (age)	Caps	Goals	Club
1	GK	Hope Solo	30 July 1981 (aged 35)	201	0	(United States Soccer Federation) Seattle Reign FC
2	FW	Mallory Pugh	29 April 1998 (aged 18)	16	4	(United States Soccer Federation) Real Colorado
3	MF	Allie Long	13 August 1987 (aged 28)	13	2	(United States Soccer Federation) Portland Thorns FC
4	DF	Becky Sauerbrunn	6 June 1985 (aged 31)	112	0	(United States Soccer Federation) FC Kansas City
5	DF	Kelley O'Hara	4 August 1988 (aged 27)	85	2	(United States Soccer Federation) Sky Blue FC
6	DF	Whitney Engen	28 November 1987 (aged 28)	39	4	(United States Soccer Federation) Boston Breakers
7	DF	Meghan Klingenberg	2 August 1988 (aged 28)	67	3	(United States Soccer Federation) Portland Thorns FC
8	DF	Julie Johnston	6 April 1992 (aged 24)	40	8	(United States Soccer Federation) Chicago Red Stars
9	MF	Lindsey Horan	26 May 1994 (aged 22)	23	3	(United States Soccer Federation) Portland Thorns FC
10	MF	Carli Lloyd (captain)	16 July 1982 (aged 34)	227	90	(United States Soccer Federation) Houston Dash
11	DF	Ali Krieger	28 July 1984 (aged 32)	93	1	(United States Soccer Federation) Washington Spirit
12	FW	Christen Press	29 December 1988 (aged 27)	73	34	(United States Soccer Federation) Chicago Red Stars
13	FW	Alex Morgan	2 July 1989 (aged 27)	115	68	(United States Soccer Federation) Orlando Pride
14	MF	Morgan Brian	26 February 1993 (aged 23)	57	4	(United States Soccer Federation) Houston Dash
15	MF	Megan Rapinoe	5 July 1985 (aged 31)	114	31	(United States Soccer Federation) Seattle Reign FC
16	FW	Crystal Dunn	3 July 1992 (aged 24)	38	15	(United States Soccer Federation) Washington Spirit
17	MF	Tobin Heath	29 May 1988 (aged 28)	121	15	(United States Soccer Federation) Portland Thorns FC
18	GK	Alyssa Naeher	20 April 1988 (aged 28)	7	0	(United States Soccer Federation) Chicago Red Stars

Unenrolled alternate players
No.	Pos.	Player	Date of birth (age)	Caps	Goals	Club
19	MF	Heather O'Reilly	2 January 1985 (aged 31)			
20	MF	Sam Mewis	9 October 1992 (aged 23)			
21	DF	Emily Sonnett	25 November 1993 (aged 22)			
22	GK	Ashlyn Harris	19 October 1985 (aged 30)			
