= Zimbabwe at the 2016 Summer Olympics =

- IOC code: ZIM
- NOC: Zimbabwe Olympic Committee
- Website: www.zoc.co.zw

in Rio de Janeiro
- Competitors: 31 in 7 sports
- Flag bearer: Kirsty Coventry
- Medals: Gold 0 Silver 0 Bronze 0 Total 0

Summer Olympics appearances (overview)
- 1928; 1932–1956; 1960; 1964; 1968–1976; 1980; 1984; 1988; 1992; 1996; 2000; 2004; 2008; 2012; 2016; 2020; 2024

Zimbabwe competed at the 2016 Summer Olympics in Rio de Janeiro, Brazil, from 5 to 21 August 2016. This was the nation's tenth consecutive appearance at the Olympics, after gaining its independence from the former Rhodesia.

The Zimbabwe Olympic Committee (ZOC) fielded a team of 31 athletes, 9 men and 22 women, to compete in seven different sports at the Games. It was the nation's largest ever delegation sent to the Olympics in a non-boycotting edition and the second-largest overall. Among the sports represented by the nation's athletes, Zimbabwe marked its Olympic debut in equestrian eventing and women's football, as well as its return to archery after nearly three decades.

Topping the list of athletes to make the Zimbabwean roster was swimmer Kirsty Coventry. At 32 years old and headed to her fifth Olympic Games, Coventry emerged herself as Zimbabwe's most decorated Olympian of all time, and Africa's most successful female swimmer in history, with a total of seven medals, including two golds in the women's 200 m backstroke. Because of her outstanding achievements in swimming, Coventry was chosen again to carry the Zimbabwean flag at the opening ceremony for the second consecutive Games.

Apart from Coventry, the Zimbabwean team also saw four more athletes competing in more than one edition. Among the returnees were single sculls rower Micheen Thornycroft, marathon runner Wirimai Juwawo, along with his teammate and three-time Olympian Cuthbert Nyasango, and double trap shooter Sean Nicholson, the oldest member of the team (aged 42).

For the second Olympics in a row, Zimbabwe left Rio de Janeiro without a single medal. Before retiring from the sport, Coventry capped off her illustrious Olympic career with a sixth-place finish in the women's 200 m backstroke, the most successful outcome for Zimbabwe at the Games.

== Archery ==
One Zimbabwean archer qualified for the men's individual recurve by obtaining one of the three Olympic places available from the 2016 African Archery Championships in Windhoek, Namibia, anticipating the nation's Olympic return to the sport for the first time since 1988.

Athlete	Event	Ranking round		Round of 64	Round of 32	Round of 16	Quarterfinals	Semifinals	Final / BM	
Athlete	Event	Score	Seed	Opposition Score	Opposition Score	Opposition Score	Opposition Score	Opposition Score	Opposition Score	Rank
Gavin Sutherland	Men's individual	566	64	Kim W-j (KOR); L 0–6	Did not advance					

== Athletics (track and field) ==
Zimbabwean athletes have so far achieved qualifying standards in the following athletics events (up to a maximum of 3 athletes in each event):

Key

- Note–Ranks given for track events are within the athlete's heat only
- Q = Qualified for the next round
- q = Qualified for the next round as a fastest loser or, in field events, by position without achieving the qualifying target
- NR = National record
- N/A = Round not applicable for the event
- Bye = Athlete not required to compete in round
- NM = No mark

Track & road events

Athlete	Event	Heat		Quarterfinal		Semifinal		Final	
Athlete	Event	Result	Rank	Result	Rank	Result	Rank	Result	Rank
Gabriel Mvumvure	Men's 100 m	Bye		10.28	7	Did not advance			
Tatenda Tsumba	Men's 200 m	21.04	6	—N/a		Did not advance			
Wirimai Juwawo	Men's marathon	—N/a						DNF	
Pardon Ndhlovu	Men's marathon	—N/a						2:17:48	41
Cuthbert Nyasango	Men's marathon	—N/a						2:18:58	58
Rutendo Nyahora	Women's marathon	—N/a						2:47:32	92

== Equestrian ==
Zimbabwe has entered one eventing rider into the Olympic equestrian competition by virtue of a top finish from Africa & Middle East in the individual FEI Olympic rankings. This signified the nation's Olympic debut in the sport of equestrian.

=== Eventing ===
Athlete	Horse	Event	Dressage		Cross-country			Jumping						Total	
Athlete	Horse	Event	Dressage		Cross-country			Qualifier			Final			Total	
Athlete	Horse	Event	Penalties	Rank	Penalties	Total	Rank	Penalties	Total	Rank	Penalties	Total	Rank	Penalties	Rank
Camilla Kruger	Biarritz	Individual	59.40	61	40.40	99.80	32	12.00	111.80	35	Did not advance			111.80	35

== Football ==
=== Women's tournament ===
Zimbabwe women's football team qualified for the Olympics by winning the fourth round play-off of the 2015 CAF Women's Olympic Qualifying Tournament.

Team roster

Head coach: Shadreck Mlauzi

Zimbabwe named a squad of 18 players and 4 alternates for the tournament, which was announced on 22 July 2016.

No.	Pos.	Player	Date of birth (age)	Caps	Goals	Club
1	GK	Chido Dzingirai	25 October 1991 (aged 24)			(Zimbabwe Football Association) Flame Lily Queens F.C.
2	DF	Lynett Mutokuto	1 September 1988 (aged 27)			(Zimbabwe Football Association) Black Rhinos F.C.
3	DF	Shiela Makoto	14 January 1990 (aged 26)			(Zimbabwe Football Association) Blue Swallows Queens F.C.
4	DF	Nobuhle Majika	9 May 1991 (aged 25)			(Zimbabwe Football Association) Inline Academy F.C.
5	MF	Emmaculate Msipa	7 June 1992 (aged 24)			(Zimbabwe Football Association) Black Rhinos F.C.
6	MF	Talent Mandaza	11 December 1985 (aged 30)			(Zimbabwe Football Association) Black Rhinos F.C.
7	FW	Rudo Neshamba	10 February 1992 (aged 24)			(Zimbabwe Football Association) Weerams F.C.
8	MF	Rejoice Kapfumvuti	18 November 1991 (aged 24)			(Zimbabwe Football Association) Inline Academy F.C.
9	FW	Samkelisiwe Zulu	14 April 1990 (aged 26)			(Zimbabwe Football Association) Flame Lily Queens F.C.
10	MF	Mavis Chirandu	15 January 1995 (aged 21)			(Zimbabwe Football Association) Weerams F.C.
11	MF	Daisy Kaitano	20 September 1993 (aged 22)			(Zimbabwe Football Association) Black Rhinos F.C.
12	MF	Marjory Nyaumwe	10 July 1987 (aged 29)			(Zimbabwe Football Association) Flame Lily Queens F.C.
13	FW	Erina Jeke	16 September 1990 (aged 25)			(Zimbabwe Football Association) Flame Lily Queens F.C.
14	DF	Eunice Chibanda	26 March 1993 (aged 23)			(Zimbabwe Football Association) Black Rhinos F.C.
15	FW	Rutendo Makore	30 September 1992 (aged 23)			(Zimbabwe Football Association) Black Rhinos F.C.
16	GK	Lindiwe Magwede	1 December 1991 (aged 24)			(Zimbabwe Football Association) Cyclone Stars F.C.
17	FW	Kudakwashe Basopo	18 July 1990 (aged 26)			(Zimbabwe Football Association) Black Rhinos F.C.
18	FW	Felistas Muzongondi (captain)	22 March 1986 (aged 30)			(Zimbabwe Football Association) Mwenezana F.C.

Group play

Pos	Team	Pld	W	D	L	GF	GA	GD	Pts	Qualification
1	Canada	3	3	0	0	7	2	+5	9	Quarter-finals
2	Germany	3	1	1	1	9	5	+4	4	Quarter-finals
3	Australia	3	1	1	1	8	5	+3	4	Quarter-finals
4	Zimbabwe	3	0	0	3	3	15	−12	0	

Source: Rio2016 & FIFA
Rules for classification: Tiebreakers
3 August 2016
18:00

Zimbabwe	1–6	Germany
Basopo 50'	Report (Rio2016); Report (FIFA)	Däbritz 22'; Popp 36'; Behringer 53', 78'; Leupolz 83'; Chibanda 90' (o.g.)

Arena Corinthians, São Paulo
Attendance: 20,521
Referee: Rita Gani (Malaysia)

6 August 2016
15:00

Canada	3–1	Zimbabwe
Beckie 7', 35'; Sinclair 19' (pen.)	Report (Rio2016); Report (FIFA)	Chirandu 86'

Arena Corinthians, São Paulo
Attendance: 30,295
Referee: Olga Miranda (Paraguay)

9 August 2016
16:00

Australia	6–1	Zimbabwe
De Vanna 2'; Polkinghorne 15'; Kennedy 37'; Simon 50'; Heyman 55', 66'	Report (Rio2016); Report (FIFA)	Msipa 90+1'

Itaipava Arena Fonte Nova, Salvador
Attendance: 5,115
Referee: Esther Staubli (Switzerland)

== Rowing ==
Zimbabwe has qualified one boat each in both the men's and women's single sculls for the Games at the 2015 African Continental Qualification Regatta in Tunis, Tunisia.

Athlete	Event	Heats		Repechage		Quarterfinals		Semifinals		Final	
Athlete	Event	Time	Rank	Time	Rank	Time	Rank	Time	Rank	Time	Rank
Andrew Peebles	Men's single sculls	7:25.39	5 R	7:17.19	3 SE/F	Bye		7:45.20	1 FE	7:43.98	25
Micheen Thornycroft	Women's single sculls	8:18.88	2 QF	Bye		7:34.38	2 SA/B	8:00.53	5 FB	7:30.57	11

Qualification Legend: FA=Final A (medal); FB=Final B (non-medal); FC=Final C (non-medal); FD=Final D (non-medal); FE=Final E (non-medal); FF=Final F (non-medal); SA/B=Semifinals A/B; SC/D=Semifinals C/D; SE/F=Semifinals E/F; QF=Quarterfinals; R=Repechage

== Shooting ==
Zimbabwe has qualified one shooter in the men's double trap by securing one of the available Olympic berths at the 2015 African Continental Championships in Cairo, Egypt.

Athlete	Event	Qualification		Semifinal		Final	
Athlete	Event	Points	Rank	Points	Rank	Points	Rank
Sean Nicholson	Men's double trap	119	19	Did not advance			

== Swimming ==
Zimbabwean swimmers have so far achieved qualifying standards in the following events (up to a maximum of 2 swimmers in each event at the Olympic Qualifying Time (OQT), and potentially 1 at the Olympic Selection Time (OST)):

Athlete	Event	Heat		Semifinal		Final	
Athlete	Event	Time	Rank	Time	Rank	Time	Rank
Sean Gunn	Men's 100 m freestyle	50.87	48	Did not advance			
Kirsty Coventry	Women's 100 m backstroke	1:00.13	11 Q	1:00.26	11	Did not advance	
Kirsty Coventry	Women's 200 m backstroke	2:08.91	9 Q	2:08.83	6 Q	2:08.80	6
