= Football at the 2016 Summer Olympics – Women's tournament – Group F =

Group F of the women's football tournament at the 2016 Summer Olympics was played from 3 to 9 August 2016, and included Australia, Canada, Germany and Zimbabwe. The top two teams advanced to the knockout stage, while the third-placed team Australia also advanced because they were among the two best third-placed teams among all three groups.

All times are BRT (UTC−3).

== Teams ==
Draw position	Team	Confederation	Method of qualification	Date of qualification	Olympic appearance	Last appearance	Previous best performance	FIFA Rankings at start of event
F1	Canada	CONCACAF	CONCACAF Qualifying 2nd place	19 February 2016	3rd	2012	Bronze medal (2012)	10
F2	Australia	AFC	AFC Qualifying 1st place	7 March 2016	3rd	2004	Quarter-finals (2004)	5
F3	Zimbabwe	CAF	CAF Qualifying winners	18 October 2015	1st	—	—	93
F4	Germany	UEFA	FIFA World Cup best European team	22 June 2015	5th	2008	Bronze medal (2000, 2004, 2008)	2

== Standings ==
Pos	Team	Pld	W	D	L	GF	GA	GD	Pts	Qualification
1	Canada	3	3	0	0	7	2	+5	9	Quarter-finals
2	Germany	3	1	1	1	9	5	+4	4	Quarter-finals
3	Australia	3	1	1	1	8	5	+3	4	Quarter-finals
4	Zimbabwe	3	0	0	3	3	15	−12	0	

Source: Rio2016 & FIFA
Rules for classification: Tiebreakers

== Matches ==
=== Canada vs Australia ===
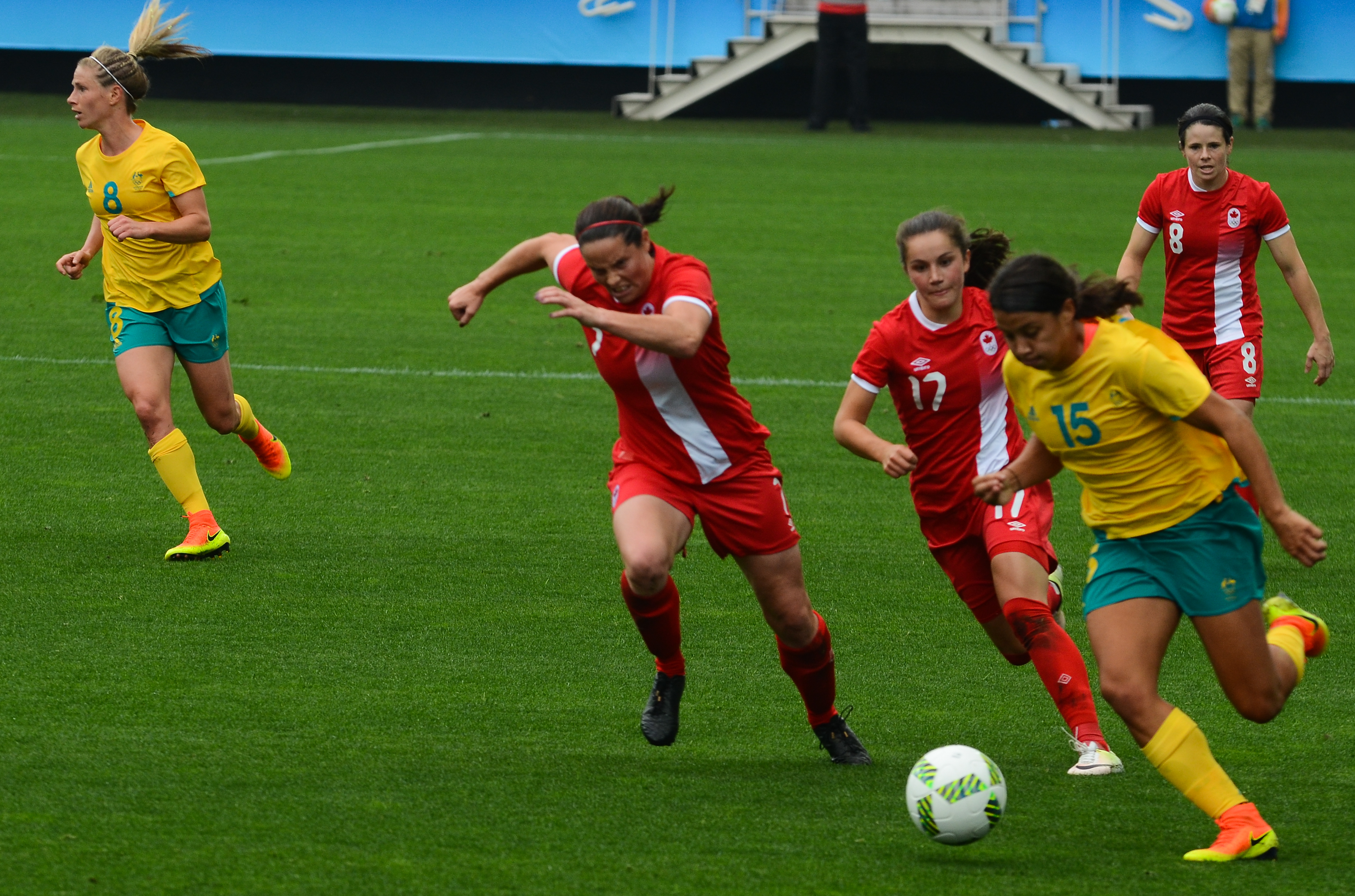

3 August 2016
15:00

Canada	2–0	Australia
Beckie 1'; Sinclair 80'	Report (Rio2016); Report (FIFA)

Arena Corinthians, São Paulo
Attendance: 20,521
Referee: Stéphanie Frappart (France)

Canada	Australia

GK	1	Stephanie Labbé
DF	3	Kadeisha Buchanan	(yellow card) 48'
DF	4	Shelina Zadorsky	(red card) 19'
DF	7	Rhian Wilkinson		(yellow card) 22' (substituted off) 46'
DF	10	Ashley Lawrence
MF	8	Diana Matheson		(substituted off) 69'
MF	11	Desiree Scott
MF	17	Jessie Fleming
FW	12	Christine Sinclair (c)
FW	14	Melissa Tancredi		(substituted off) 23'
FW	16	Janine Beckie
Substitutions:
DF	2	Allysha Chapman		(substituted on) 46'
MF	5	Quinn (Note: Then known as Rebecca Quinn)		(substituted on) 23'
MF	13	Sophie Schmidt		(substituted on) 69'
Manager:
John Herdman

GK	1	Lydia Williams
DF	4	Clare Polkinghorne (c)
DF	5	Laura Alleway
DF	14	Alanna Kennedy
MF	3	Katrina Gorry
MF	6	Chloe Logarzo	(substituted off) 61'
MF	8	Elise Kellond-Knight
MF	10	Emily van Egmond
MF	16	Michelle Heyman	(substituted off) 71'
FW	9	Caitlin Foord
FW	15	Samantha Kerr	(substituted off) 46'
Substitutions:
DF	7	Steph Catley	(substituted on) 46'
FW	11	Lisa De Vanna	(substituted on) 61'
FW	17	Kyah Simon	(substituted on) 71'
Manager:
Alen Stajcic

Assistant referees:
Manuela Nicolosi (France)
Yolanda Parga (Spain)
Fourth official:
Esther Staubli (Switzerland)

=== Zimbabwe vs Germany ===
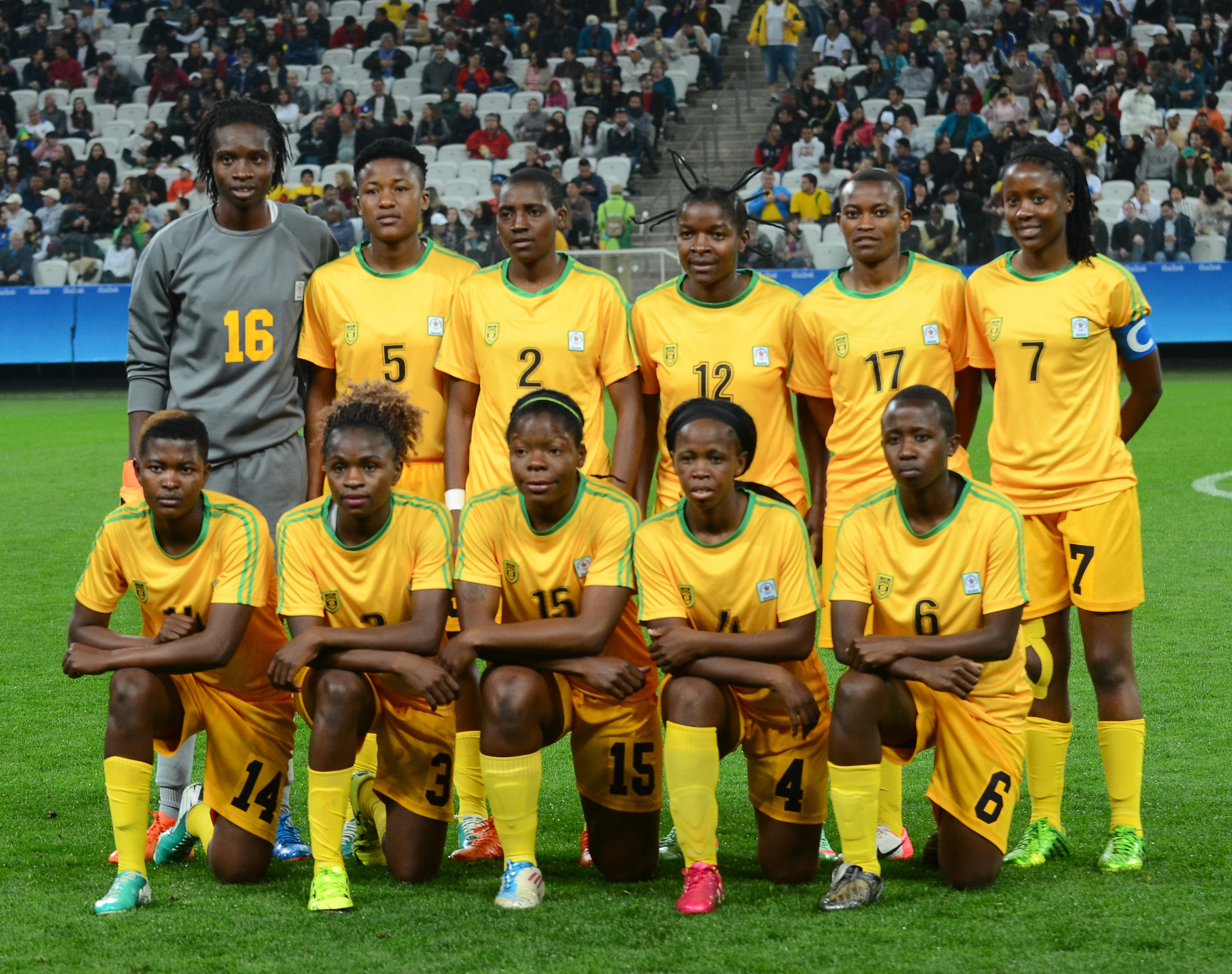
Zimbabwean team at the match

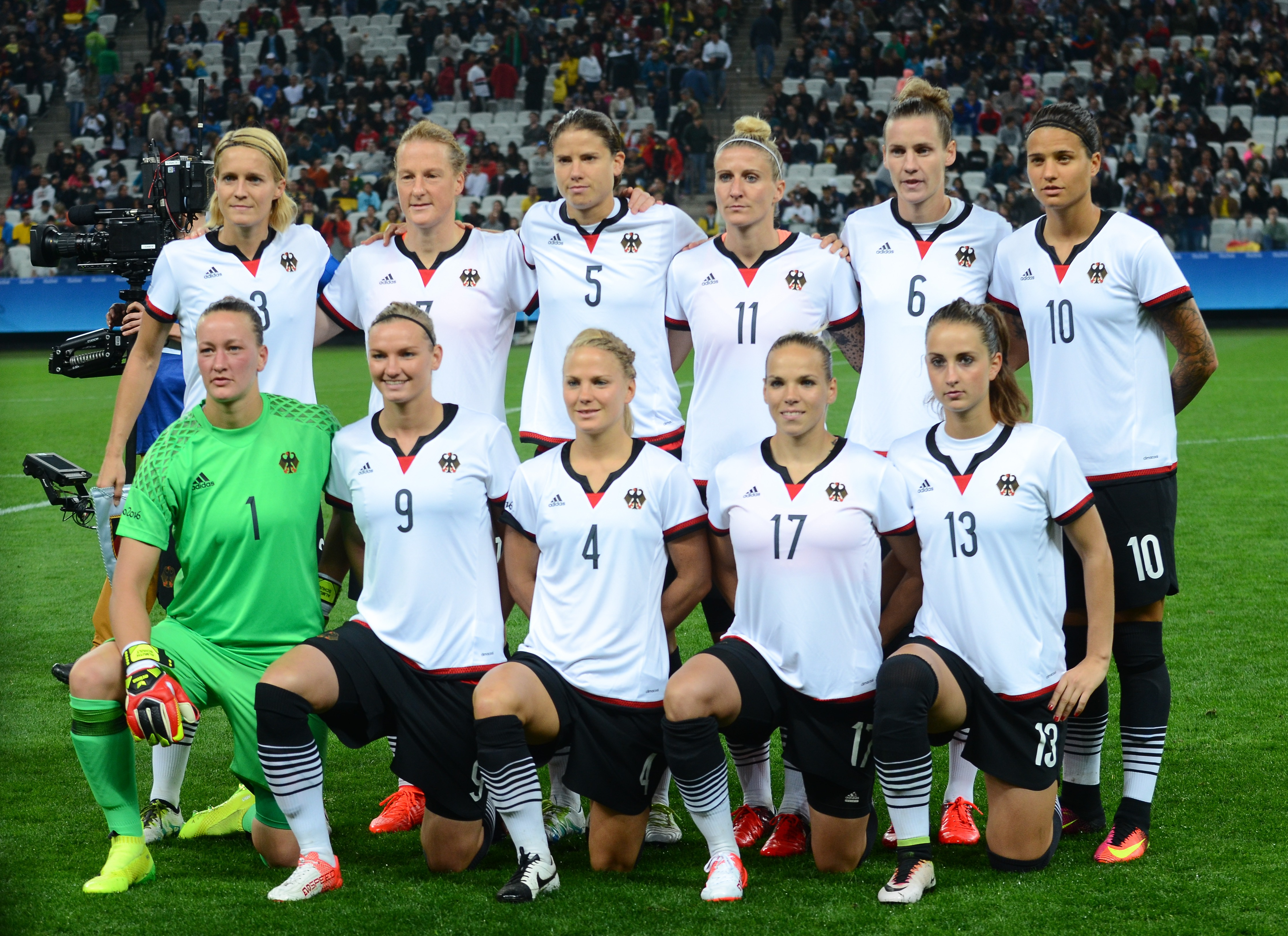
German team at the match

3 August 2016
18:00

Zimbabwe	1–6	Germany
Basopo 50'	Report (Rio2016); Report (FIFA)	Däbritz 22'; Popp 36'; Behringer 53', 78'; Leupolz 83'; Chibanda 90' (o.g.)

Arena Corinthians, São Paulo
Attendance: 20,521
Referee: Rita Gani (Malaysia)

Zimbabwe	Germany

GK	16	Lindiwe Magwede
DF	2	Lynett Mutokuto
DF	3	Shiela Makoto	(yellow card) 41'
DF	4	Nobuhle Majika	(yellow card) 77'
DF	14	Eunice Chibanda
MF	5	Msipa Emmaculate		(substituted off) 81'
MF	6	Talent Mandaza
MF	12	Marjory Nyaumwe
FW	7	Rudo Neshamba (c)		(substituted off) 46'
FW	15	Rutendo Makore	(yellow card) 90+1'
FW	17	Kudakwashe Basopo		(substituted off) 81'
Substitutions:
FW	18	Felistas Muzongondi		(substituted on) 46'
MF	11	Daisy Kaitano		(substituted on) 81'
FW	13	Erina Jeke		(substituted on) 81'
Manager:
Shadreck Mlauzi

GK	1	Almuth Schult
DF	3	Saskia Bartusiak (c)
DF	4	Leonie Maier
DF	5	Annike Krahn
MF	6	Simone Laudehr	(substituted off) 19'
MF	7	Melanie Behringer
MF	13	Sara Däbritz
MF	17	Isabel Kerschowski	(substituted off) 72'
FW	9	Alexandra Popp
FW	10	Dzsenifer Marozsán
FW	11	Anja Mittag	(substituted off) 65'
Substitutions:
MF	16	Melanie Leupolz	(substituted on) 19'
MF	8	Lena Goeßling	(substituted on) 65'
DF	12	Tabea Kemme	(substituted on) 72'
Manager:
Silvia Neid

Assistant referees:
Cui Yongmei (China)
Naomi Teshirogi (Japan)
Fourth official:
Lucila Venegas (Mexico)

=== Canada vs Zimbabwe ===
6 August 2016
15:00

Canada	3–1	Zimbabwe
Beckie 7', 35'; Sinclair 19' (pen.)	Report (Rio2016); Report (FIFA)	Chirandu 86'

Arena Corinthians, São Paulo
Attendance: 30,295
Referee: Olga Miranda (Paraguay)

Canada	Zimbabwe

GK	18	Sabrina D'Angelo
DF	3	Kadeisha Buchanan	(yellow card) 59'
DF	9	Josée Bélanger	(yellow card) 80'
DF	10	Ashley Lawrence
MF	5	Quinn
MF	8	Diana Matheson		(substituted off) 63'
MF	13	Sophie Schmidt
MF	17	Jessie Fleming	(yellow card) 58'	(substituted off) 70'
FW	12	Christine Sinclair (c)
FW	14	Melissa Tancredi		(substituted off) 61'
FW	16	Janine Beckie
Substitutions:
FW	6	Deanne Rose		(substituted on) 61'
DF	2	Allysha Chapman		(substituted on) 63'
FW	15	Nichelle Prince		(substituted on) 70'
Manager:
John Herdman

GK	1	Chido Dringirai	(yellow card) 18'
DF	3	Shiela Makoto
DF	4	Nobuhle Majika
DF	14	Eunice Chibanda
MF	5	Msipa Emmaculate
MF	6	Talent Mandaza
MF	8	Rejoice Kapfumvuti
MF	12	Marjory Nyaumwe
FW	15	Rutendo Makore		(substituted off) 79'
FW	17	Kudakwashe Bhasopo		(substituted off) 88'
FW	18	Felistas Muzongondi (c)		(substituted off) 68'
Substitutions:
MF	10	Mavis Chirandu		(substituted on) 68'
MF	11	Daisy Kaitano		(substituted on) 79'
FW	13	Erina Jeke		(substituted on) 88'
Manager:
Shadreck Mlauzi

Assistant referees:
Mariana de Almeida (Argentina)
Yoleida Lara (Venezuela)
Fourth official:
Teodora Albon (Romania)

=== Germany vs Australia ===
6 August 2016
18:00

Germany	2–2	Australia
Däbritz 45+2'; Bartusiak 88'	Report (Rio2016); Report (FIFA)	Kerr 6'; Foord 45'

Arena Corinthians, São Paulo
Attendance: 37,475
Referee: Anna-Marie Keighley (New Zealand)

Germany	Australia

GK	1	Almuth Schult
DF	3	Saskia Bartusiak (c)
DF	4	Leonie Maier
DF	5	Annike Krahn		(substituted off) 46'
DF	12	Tabea Kemme
MF	7	Melanie Behringer
MF	13	Sara Däbritz
MF	16	Melanie Leupolz
FW	9	Alexandra Popp	(yellow card) 30'
FW	10	Dzsenifer Marozsán		(substituted off) 70'
FW	11	Anja Mittag		(substituted off) 61'
Substitutions:
DF	2	Josephine Henning	(yellow card) 56'	(substituted on) 46'
MF	17	Isabel Kerschowski		(substituted on) 61'
MF	8	Lena Goeßling		(substituted on) 70'
Manager:
Silvia Neid

GK	1	Lydia Williams
DF	4	Clare Polkinghorne
DF	5	Laura Alleway
DF	7	Steph Catley
DF	14	Alanna Kennedy
MF	3	Katrina Gorry
MF	8	Elise Kellond-Knight
MF	11	Lisa De Vanna (c)	(substituted off) 67'
FW	9	Caitlin Foord
FW	15	Samantha Kerr	(substituted off) 83'
FW	17	Kyah Simon
Substitutions:
MF	6	Chloe Logarzo	(substituted on) 67'
FW	16	Michelle Heyman	(substituted on) 83'
Manager:
Alen Stajcic

Assistant referees:
Sarah Jones (New Zealand)
Lata Kaumatule (Tonga)
Fourth official:
Stéphanie Frappart (France)

=== Australia vs Zimbabwe ===
9 August 2016
16:00

Australia	6–1	Zimbabwe
De Vanna 2'; Polkinghorne 15'; Kennedy 37'; Simon 50'; Heyman 55', 66'	Report (Rio2016); Report (FIFA)	Msipa 90+1'

Itaipava Arena Fonte Nova, Salvador
Attendance: 5,115
Referee: Esther Staubli (Switzerland)

Australia	Zimbabwe

GK	18	Mackenzie Arnold
DF	4	Clare Polkinghorne
DF	7	Steph Catley
DF	14	Alanna Kennedy
MF	3	Katrina Gorry		(substituted off) 52'
MF	6	Chloe Logarzo	(yellow card) 90+5'
MF	8	Elise Kellond-Knight
MF	9	Caitlin Foord		(substituted off) 75'
MF	10	Emily van Egmond
FW	11	Lisa De Vanna (c)		(substituted off) 74'
FW	17	Kyah Simon
Substitutions:
FW	16	Michelle Heyman		(substituted on) 52'
FW	2	Larissa Crummer		(substituted on) 74'
DF	12	Ellie Carpenter		(substituted on) 75'
Manager:
Alen Stajcic

GK	1	Chido Dringirai		(substituted off) 58'
DF	2	Lynett Mutokuto
DF	3	Shiela Makoto	(yellow card) 80'
DF	4	Nobuhle Majika (c)
DF	14	Eunice Chibanda
MF	5	Msipa Emmaculate
MF	6	Talent Mandaza
MF	8	Rejoice Kapfumvuti		(substituted off) 75'
MF	10	Mavis Chirandu		(substituted off) 46'
MF	12	Marjory Nyaumwe
FW	17	Kudakwashe Bhasopo
Substitutions:
FW	15	Rutendo Makore		(substituted on) 46'
GK	16	Lindiwe Magwede		(substituted on) 58'
MF	11	Daisy Kaitano		(substituted on) 75'
Manager:
Shadreck Mlauzi

Assistant referees:
Lucie Ratajová (Czech Republic)
Chrysoula Kourompylia (Greece)
Fourth official:
Kateryna Monzul (Ukraine)

=== Germany vs Canada ===
9 August 2016
16:00

Germany	1–2	Canada
Behringer 13' (pen.)	Report (Rio2016); Report (FIFA)	Tancredi 26', 60'

Estádio Nacional Mané Garrincha, Brasília
Attendance: 8,227
Referee: Ri Hyang-ok (North Korea)

Germany	Canada

GK	1	Almuth Schult
DF	2	Josephine Henning		(substituted off) 46'
DF	3	Saskia Bartusiak (c)
DF	12	Tabea Kemme
DF	14	Babett Peter
MF	7	Melanie Behringer
MF	8	Lena Goeßling
MF	17	Isabel Kerschowski		(substituted off) 68'
FW	10	Dzsenifer Marozsán	(yellow card) 59'	(substituted off) 68'
FW	11	Anja Mittag
FW	15	Mandy Islacker
Substitutions:
DF	5	Annike Krahn		(substituted on) 46'
FW	9	Alexandra Popp		(substituted on) 68'
MF	16	Melanie Leupolz		(substituted on) 68'
Manager:
Silvia Neid

GK	1	Stephanie Labbé
DF	2	Allysha Chapman
DF	4	Shelina Zadorsky
DF	7	Rhian Wilkinson
DF	9	Josée Bélanger
MF	5	Quinn
MF	11	Desiree Scott
MF	13	Sophie Schmidt		(substituted off) 64'
MF	17	Jessie Fleming		(substituted off) 46'
FW	6	Deanne Rose		(substituted off) 69'
FW	14	Melissa Tancredi (c)
Substitutions:
DF	10	Ashley Lawrence		(substituted on) 46'
MF	8	Diana Matheson		(substituted on) 64'
FW	15	Nichelle Prince	(yellow card) 90'	(substituted on) 69'
Manager:
John Herdman

Assistant referees:
Hong Kum-nyo (North Korea)
Cui Yongmei (China)
Fourth official:
Gladys Lengwe (Zambia)
