= Zimbabwe at the 2011 All-Africa Games =

- IOC code: ZIM
- NOC: Zimbabwe Olympic Committee

in Maputo
- Medals Ranked 11th: Gold 6 Silver 7 Bronze 2 Total 15

All-Africa Games appearances (overview)
- 1987; 1991; 1995; 1999; 2003; 2007; 2011; 2015; 2019; 2023

Zimbabwe participated at the 2011 All-Africa Games, which took place from 3 to 18 September 2011 in Maputo, Mozambique, sending 170 athletes in 17 disciplines.

Zimbabwean athletes participated in: athletics, badminton, basketball, boxing, chess, cycling, judo, karate, netball, sailing, swimming, table tennis, taekwondo, tennis, and triathlon. The team announcement also included 12 athletes in disabled event categories.

== Medalists ==
- Kirsty Coventry: gold in 100m backstroke, 200m backstroke, 100m Individual Medley; silver in chess
- Takanyi Garanganga: gold in 200m Individual Medley
- Takanyi Garanganga & Mark Fynn: bronze in doubletennis
- Robert Gwaze: gold in singles tennis
- Nicole Horn: silver in 100m butterfly, 100m freestyle
- Nyaradzai Tagarira: silver in 200m freestyle
- Samantha Welch: bronze in 100m breastroke
- Kirsten Lapham, Samantha Welch, Kirsty Coventry, Nicole Horn: silver in 100m (T13)
- Kirsten Lapham, Samantha Welch, Kirsty Coventry, Nicole Horn: silver in 4 × 400 m IM
- Kirsten Lapham, Samantha Welch, Kirsty Coventry, Nicole Horn: silver in 4 × 100 m freestyle
- Kirsten Lapham, Samantha Welch, Kirsty Coventry, Nicole Horn: silver in 4 × 200 m freestyle

== Results ==
=== Athletics ===
- Men - Ngoni Makusha, Gabriel Mvumvure, Kelvin Pangiso, Brian Dzingai, Francis Zimwara, Nelton Ndebele, Connias Mudzingwa, Tinashe Mutanga, David, Tinago, Abdul Simbili, D. Bhebhe, Lewis Masunda
- Women - Letiwe Mharakurwa, Namatirai Mavugara, Grace Gimo, Faith Goremusandu, Thandi Nyathi, Irene Ndoreka

=== Badminton ===
Ngoni Mhinda, Paul Kapolo, Rishi Verma

=== Basketball ===
Women's team - Rachel Makoni, Margret Magwaro, Fadzai Mabasa, Charity Chigumba, Isobel Tengende, Dorcas Marondera, Sharon Chamwarura, Ethel Shaba, Sibongile Mkandla, Alex Maseko, Nobunkosi Ndlovu, Geraldine Chibonda

=== Boxing ===
Josphat Mufayi, Foster Masiyambumbi, Steven Masiyambumbi

=== Chess ===
Robert Gwaze, Rodwell Makoto, Dion Moyo, Leeroy Paratambwa, Spencer Masango

=== Cycling ===
Brighton Chipongo, David Martin, Conway Mohamed, Nkulumo Dube, Alfred Tigere

=== Women's football ===
Onai Chingawo, Chido Dzingirai, Manyara Mandara, Rudo Neshamba, Ruvimbo Mutyavaviri, Eunice Chibanda, Nobuhle Magika, Ntombizodwa Sibanda, Rufaro Machingura, Danai Bhobho, Patience Mujuru, Talent Mandaza, Marjory Nyaumwe, Tsitsi Mairosi, Nokuthula Ndlovu, Violet Bepete, Emmaculate Msipa, Erina Jeke, Kudakwashe Basopo, Ntombiyelanga Ndlovu

=== Judo ===
Bruce Sibanda, Sydney Chibwayi, Simbarashe Mashayi

=== Karate ===
Gondo Gondo, Victor Bhunu, David Dube, Winston Nyanhete, Justin Mashiri, Simba Chihlava, Kuda Chihlava

=== Netball ===
Sukokuhle Nkomo, Tarisai Sesa, Daphine Agere, Paida Pedzisayi, Rudo Karume, Caroline Matura, Pauline Jani, Perpetua Siyachitema, Edzai Nkosana, Patience Chinhoyi, Netsai Muchemwa,

=== Sailing ===
Kegan Stubs, Laphan Dennis, Ryan Kluckow, Pavlo Hiripis, Patrick MacCosh, Androniki Hiripisi, Andrew Faber, Cameron MacCosh

=== Swimming ===
Kirsty Coventry, Nicole Horn, Kirsten Lapham, Samatha Welch, Grant Behan, Tim Ferris, James Lawson, Nicholas Burnett

=== Table Tennis ===
Tinashe Chikaka, Brian Chamboko, Cythia Marisamhuka, Fungai Mashingaidze, Takudzwa Mudonhi, John Muringani (President)

=== Taekwondo ===
Mike Sidija, Knowledge Machakati, Langton Chokwenda, Marylin Mangoto

=== Tennis ===
Mbonisi Ndimande, Takanyi Garanganga, Valeria Bhunu, Pauline Chawafambira

=== Triathlon ===
Chris Felgate, Brendon Mitchell, Cory O'Riorden, Laurelle Brown, Pamela Fulton Sports for People with

=== Disabilities ===
Laina Sithole, Tagarira Nyaradzai, Rodah Bulabula, Brave Pugeni, Peter Chideme, Polite Maradzika, Desire Chivanga, Elliot Mujaji, Clement Nyoni, Kuda Hove, Elford Moyo, Maggie Bangajena
