= Women's football in Zimbabwe =

- Country: Zimbabwe
- Governing body: Zimbabwe Football Association
- National team(s): Women's national team

Women's football in Zimbabwe is popular but women who play the game face stigmatisation.

In 2012, the Zimbabwe Women’s Football Super League was created to improve the Zimbabwe women's national football team. Audience attendances were large for a debut season.

However, the second season of the league did not follow until 2014, after a full year's break. The women's national team qualified for their first Olympic Games in 2016.

== See also ==
- Football in Zimbabwe
- Zimbabwe women's national football team
