= Ntombiyelanga Ndlovu =

Zimbabwean footballer

Personal information
- Position: Forward

Senior career*
Years	Team	Apps	(Gls)
- New Orleans

International career
- Zimbabwe
- * Club domestic league appearances and goals

Ntombiyelanga Ndlovu is a Zimbabwean former footballer who played as a forward. She has been a member of the Zimbabwe women's national team.

== Club career ==
Ndlovu played for New Orleans in Zimbabwe, where she led the league in scoring one season. However, she broke her foot during a training session with the club in October 2011.

== International career ==
Ndlovu capped for Zimbabwe at senior level during the 2008 African Women's Championship qualification.
