= Danai Bhobho =

Zimbabwean footballer (born 1992)

Personal information
- Date of birth: 1 December 1992 (age 33)
- Position: Defender

Senior career*
Years	Team	Apps	(Gls)
- Mwenezana

International career
- Zimbabwe
- * Club domestic league appearances and goals

Danai Bhobho (born 1 December 1992) is a Zimbabwean footballer who plays as a defender. She has been a member of the Zimbabwe women's national team.

== Club career ==
In June 2021, Bhobho joined Tanzanian side Simba S.C. on a two-year contract.

== International career ==
Bhobho capped for Zimbabwe at senior level during the 2016 Africa Women Cup of Nations.
