= Emelie Lundberg =

Swedish footballer

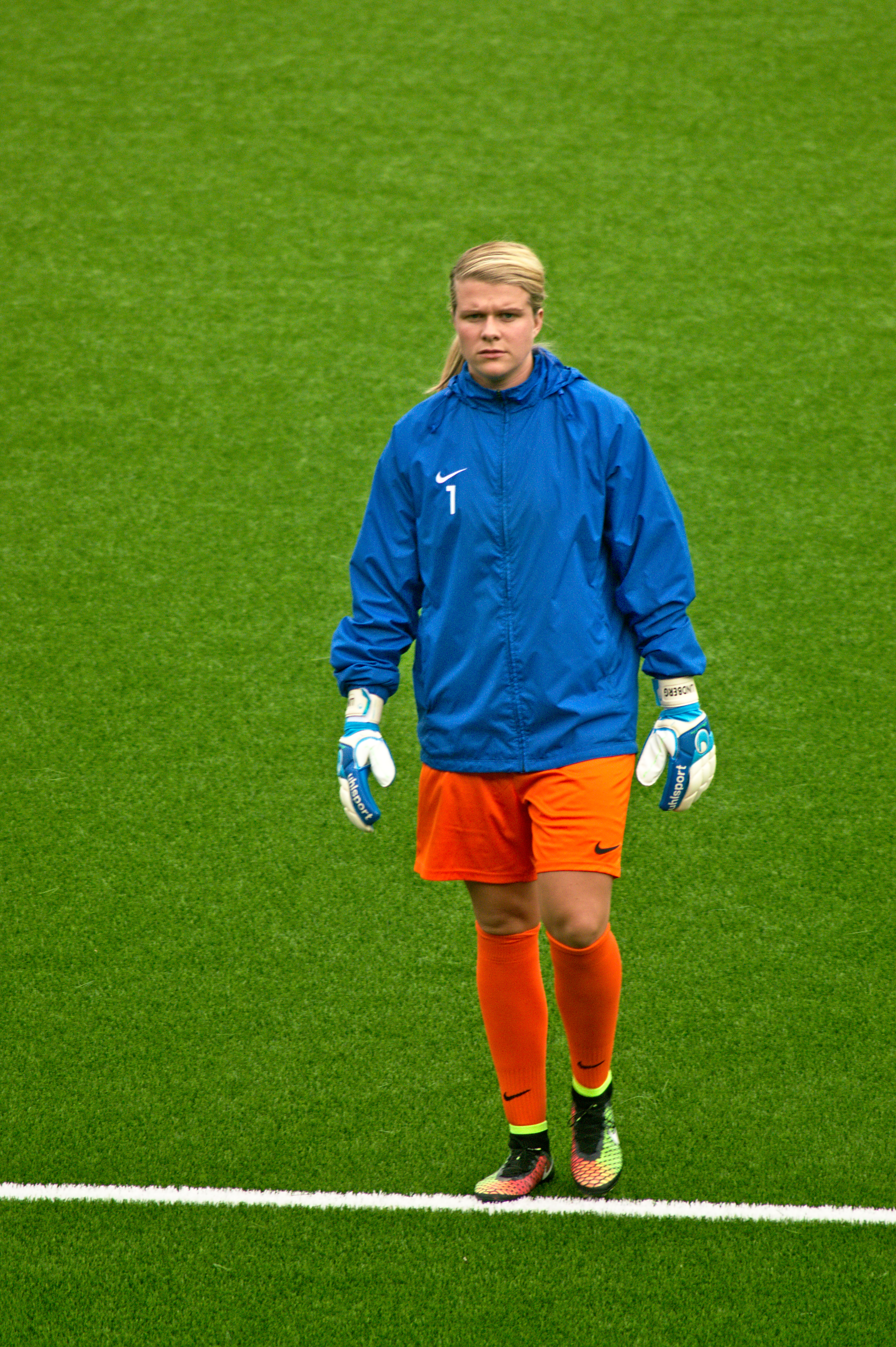
- Lundberg in 2015

Personal information
- Full name: Emelie Mathilda Viktoria Lundberg
- Date of birth: 10 March 1993 (age 33)
- Place of birth: Eskilstuna, Sweden
- Position: Goalkeeper

Senior career*
Years	Team	Apps	(Gls)
2010–2011	Mallbackens IF		
2011	Eskilstuna United DFF	9	(0)
2011–2012	KIF Örebro DFF	1	(0)
2012–2021	Eskilstuna United	165	(0)

International career^{‡}
2010	Sweden U19	1	(0)
- * Club domestic league appearances and goals as of 01:49, 18 May 2016 (UTC) ‡ National team caps and goals as of 01:49, 18 May 2016 (UTC)

Emelie Mathilda Viktoria Lundberg (born 10 March 1993) is a Swedish football goalkeeper.

== Honours ==
Eskilstuna United DFF

Runner-up

- Damallsvenskan: 2015
