= Mavis Chirandu =

Zimbabwean footballer (born 1995)

Personal information
- Date of birth: 15 January 1995 (age 31)
- Place of birth: Harare, Zimbabwe
- Height: 1.57 m (5 ft 2 in)
- Position: Midfielder

Team information
- Current team: Weerams FC

Senior career*
Years	Team	Apps	(Gls)
- Weerams FC

International career^{‡}
2013–	Zimbabwe		
- * Club domestic league appearances and goals as of 12:52, 7 August 2016 (UTC) ‡ National team caps and goals as of 12:52, 7 August 2016 (UTC)

Mavis Chirandu (born 15 January 1995) is a Zimbabwean footballer who plays for Weerams F.C. and the Zimbabwe women's national football team.

== Biography and career ==
As a newborn, Chirandu was abandoned by her mother in some roadside bushes. She was brought up in an SOS Children's Villages orphanage in Bindura. She played for the senior Zimbabwe team for the first time in 2013, against Uruguay. She acquired the nickname "Madam Chair" after Zimbabwe's women's football chairman Mavis Gumbo, and scored her first international goal in a 6–1 win over Lesotho in November 2013.

At 21 years old, left-sided midfielder Chirandu was included in the national squad for the 2016 Summer Olympics. She scored Zimbabwe's late consolation goal in their 3–1 group stage defeat by Canada at Arena Corinthians, São Paulo.
