= Ruvimbo Mutyavaviri =

Zimbabwean footballer (born 1986)

Personal information
- Full name: Ruvimbo Brenda Mutyavaviri
- Date of birth: 8 December 1986 (age 39)
- Position: Defender

Senior career*
Years	Team	Apps	(Gls)
- Mufakose Queens

International career
- Zimbabwe
- * Club domestic league appearances and goals

Ruvimbo Brenda Mutyavaviri (born 8 December 1986) is a Zimbabwean footballer who plays as a defender. She has been a member of the Zimbabwe women's national team.

== International career ==
Mutyavaviri capped for Zimbabwe at senior level during the 2016 Africa Women Cup of Nations.
