= Shadreck Mlauzi =

Zimbabwean football manager and teacher (born 1980)

Personal information
- Date of birth: 6 January 1980 (age 46)

Managerial career
- Years: Team
- 2015–2017: Zimbabwe Women
- 2022-2023: Zimbabwe (assistant coach)
- 2022-2023: Zimbabwe U-20 (assistant coach)
- 2022-2023: Zimbabwe U-23 (assistant coach)
- 2023-2024: Zimbabwe Women

Shadreck Mlauzi (born 6 January 1980) is a Zimbabwean football manager and teacher.

== Career ==
Mlauzi coached the Zimbabwe's women national football team at their first appearance at the Summer Olympics in 2016.

== Personal life ==
Mlauzi studied sports science at Zimbabwe Open University. He works as a physical education teacher at Sikhulile High School.
