= Samkelisiwe Zulu =

Zimbabwean footballer (born 1990)

Samkelisiwe Zulu (born 14 April 1990) is a Zimbabwean footballer. She represented Zimbabwe in the football competition at the 2016 Summer Olympics.
