= Felistas Muzongondi =

Zimbabwean footballer (born 1986)

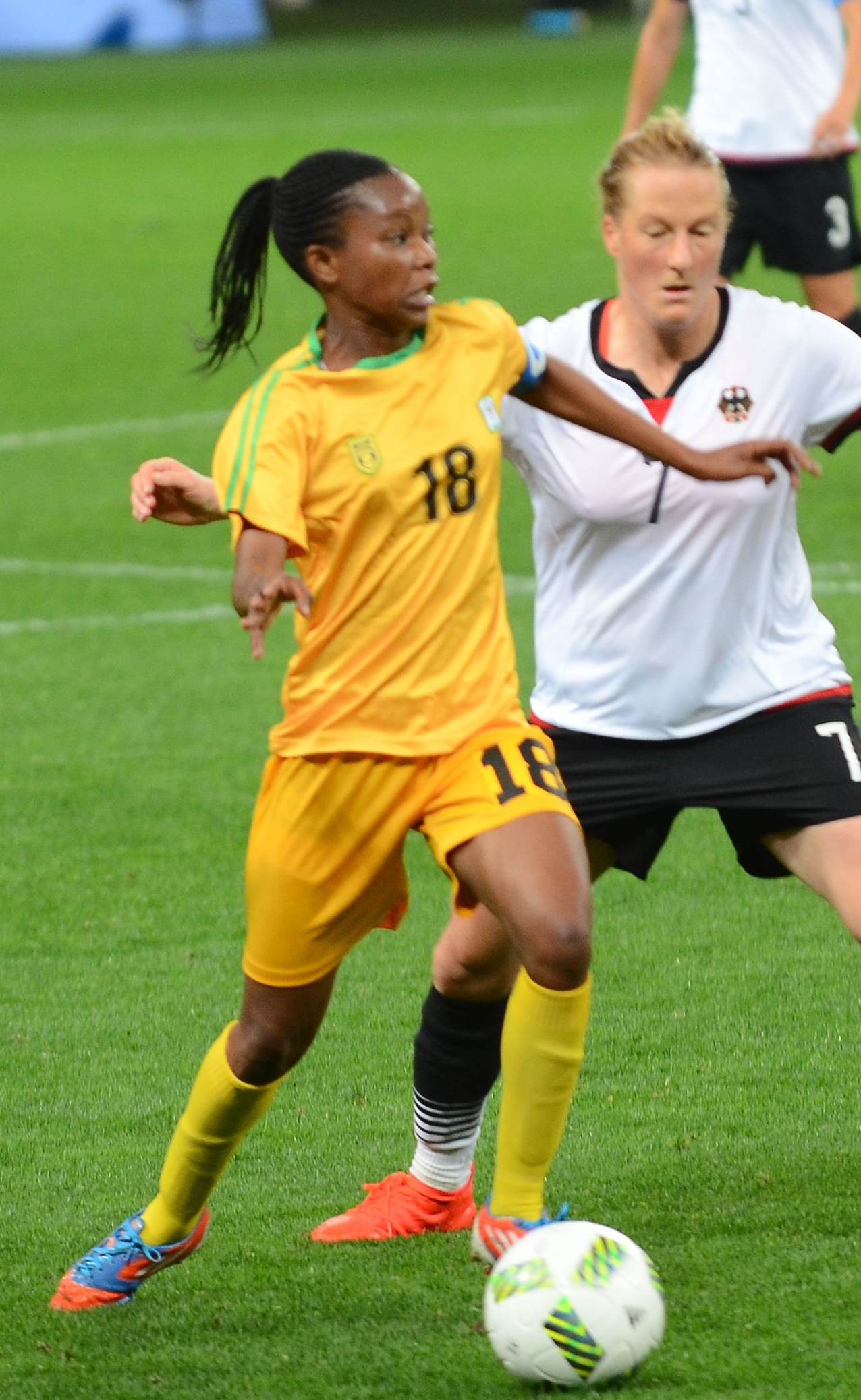
- Muzongondi (left) at the 2016 Olympics

Personal information
- Date of birth: 22 March 1986 (age 40)
- Place of birth: Masvingo, Zimbabwe
- Height: 1.67 m (5 ft 6 in)
- Position: Forward

International career
Years	Team	Apps	(Gls)
- Zimbabwe

Felistas Muzongondi (born 22 March 1986) is a Zimbabwean association football player. She is a member of the Zimbabwe women's national football team and represented the country in their Olympic debut at the 2016 Summer Olympics.
