= Lynett Mutokuto =

Zimbabwean footballer (born 1988)

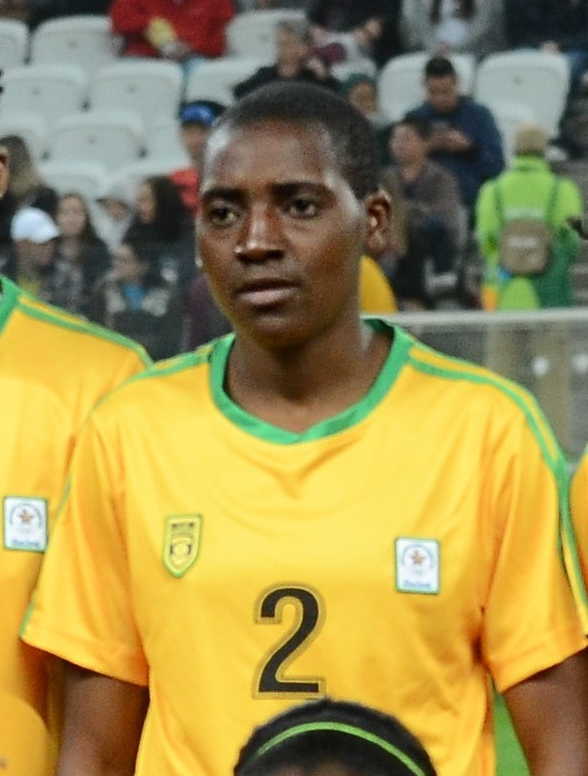
- Mutokuto at the 2016 Olympics

Personal information
- Date of birth: 1 September 1988 (age 38)
- Place of birth: Zimbabwe
- Height: 1.61 m (5 ft 3 in)
- Position: Defender

International career
Years	Team	Apps	(Gls)
- Zimbabwe

Lynett Mutokuto (born 1 September 1988) is a Zimbabwean association football defender. She is a member of the Zimbabwe women's national football team and represented the country in their Olympic debut at the 2016 Summer Olympics.
