= Lindiwe Magwede =

Zimbabwean footballer (born 1991)

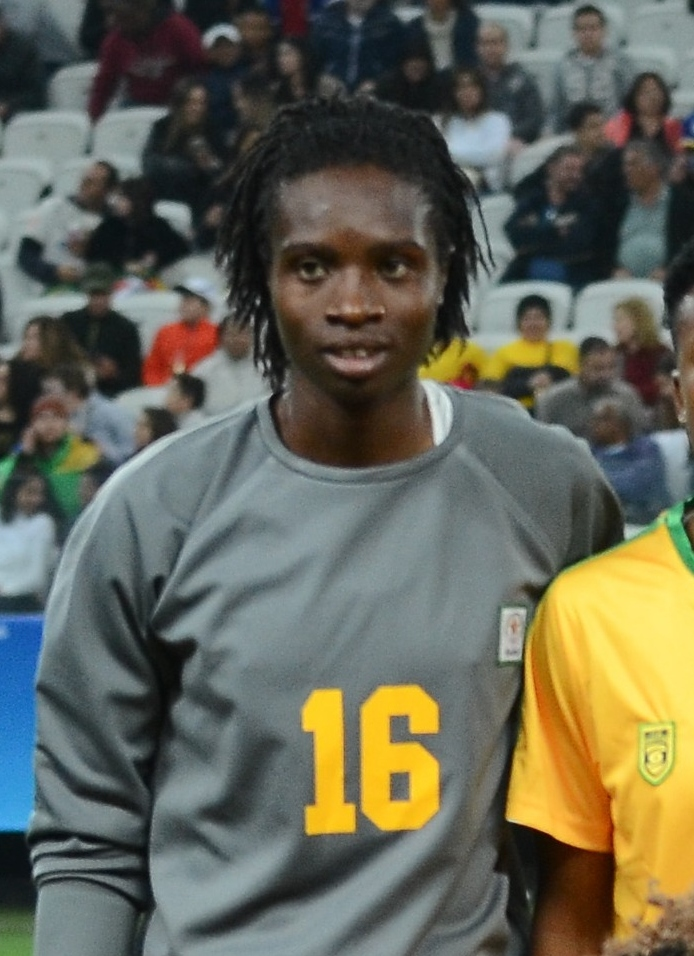
- Magwede at the 2016 Olympics

Personal information
- Date of birth: 1 December 1991 (age 34)
- Place of birth: Zimbabwe
- Height: 1.76 m (5 ft 9 in)
- Position: Goalkeeper

International career
Years	Team	Apps	(Gls)
- Zimbabwe

Lindiwe Magwede (born 1 December 1991) is a Zimbabwean association football goalkeeper. She is a member of the Zimbabwe women's national football team and represented the country in their Olympic debut at the 2016 Summer Olympics.
