= Rejoice Kapfumvuti =

Zimbabwean footballer (born 1991)

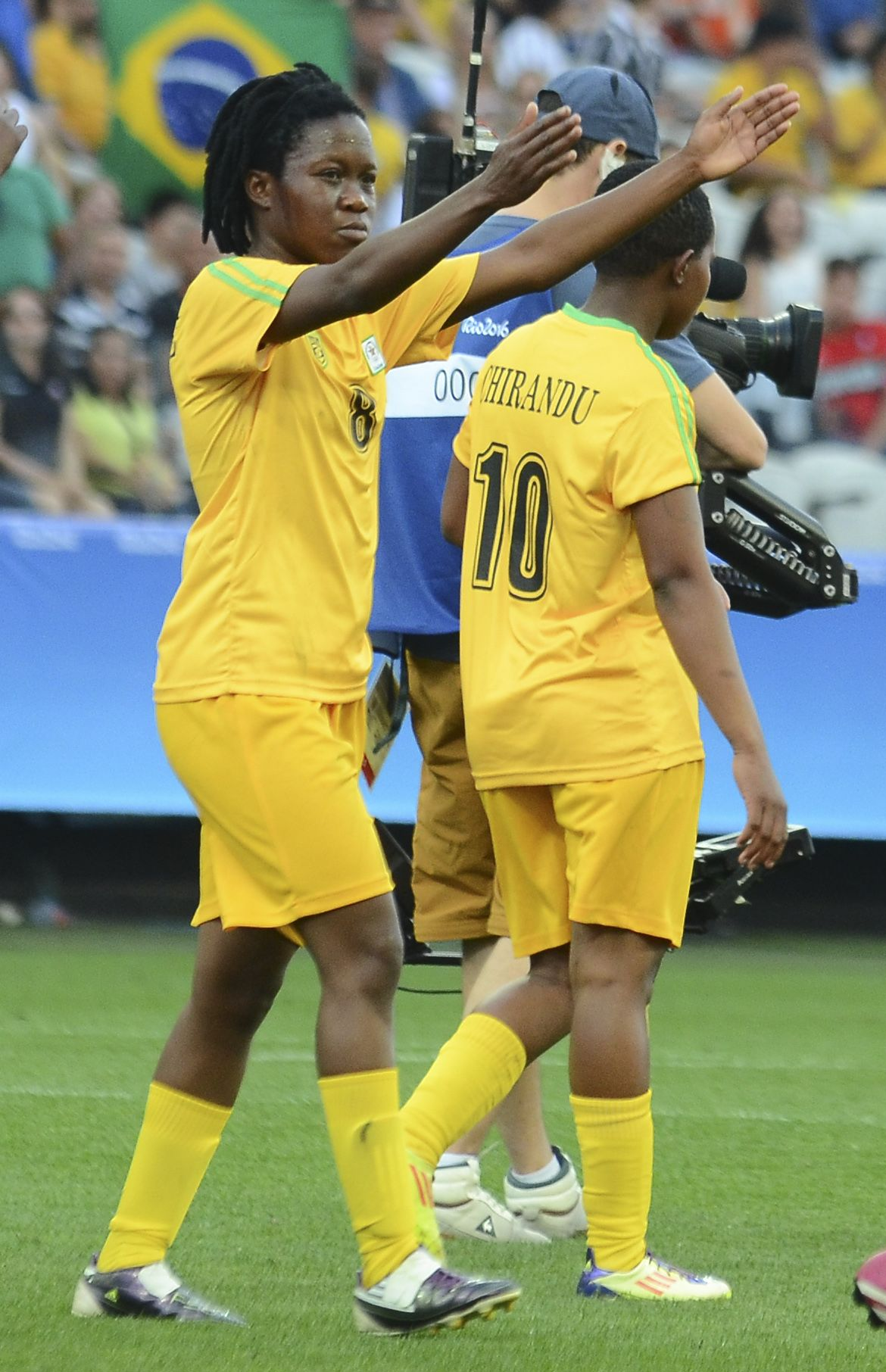
- Kapfumvuti at the 2016 Olympics

Personal information
- Date of birth: 18 November 1991 (age 34)
- Place of birth: Bulawayo, Zimbabwe
- Height: 1.60 m (5 ft 3 in)
- Position: Midfielder

Team information
- Current team: Inline Academy

Senior career*
Years	Team	Apps	(Gls)
- Inline Academy

International career
- Zimbabwe
- * Club domestic league appearances and goals

Rejoice "Joyi" Kapfumvuti (born 18 November 1991) is a Zimbabwean association football player. She is a member of the Zimbabwe women's national football team and represented the country in their Olympic debut at the 2016 Summer Olympics.

Bulawayo-born Kapfumvuti became known as "The Maestro" for her performances for the successful Inline Academy club. Frustration with the level of domestic competition in Zimbabwe meant Kapfumvuti planned to retire from football after the 2016 Olympics.
