= Shiela Makoto =

Zimbabwean footballer (born 1990)

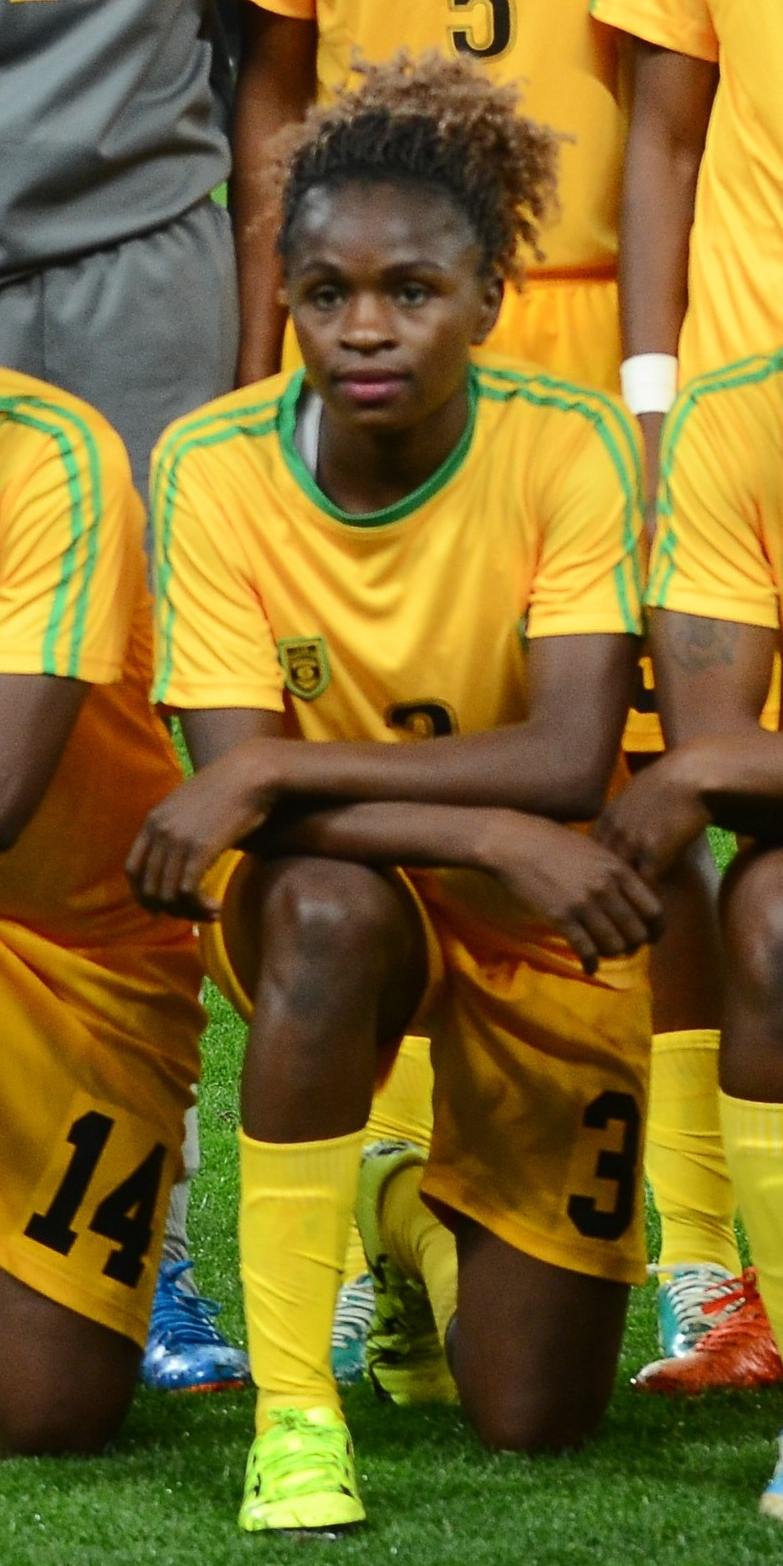
- Makoto at the 2016 Olympics

Personal information
- Date of birth: 14 January 1990 (age 36)
- Place of birth: Zimbabwe
- Height: 1.58 m (5 ft 2 in)
- Position: Defender

International career
Years	Team	Apps	(Gls)
- Zimbabwe

Shiela Makoto (born 14 January 1990) is a Zimbabwean association football defender. She is a member of the Zimbabwe women's national football team and represented the country in their Olympic debut at the 2016 Summer Olympics.

Makoto played for the Blue Swallows Queens in 2016. She was brought up in poverty in a family of seven. She gained a career from her skill at football. She has trained in Switzerland and her education was funded by football.
