= Emmaculate Msipa =

Zimbabwean footballer (born 1992)

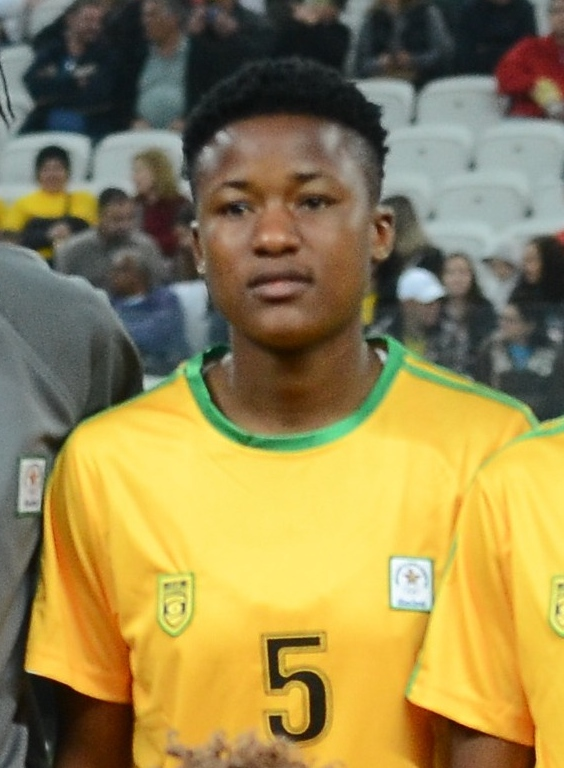
- Msipa at the 2016 Olympics

Personal information
- Date of birth: 7 June 1992 (age 34)
- Place of birth: Harare, Zimbabwe
- Height: 1.68 m (5 ft 6 in)
- Position: Midfielder

Team information
- Current team: Fatih Karagümrük
- Number: 66

Senior career*
Years	Team	Apps	(Gls)
2021	Joventut Almassora	10	(0)
2021–	Fatih Karagümrük	26	(3)
2022–2023	Ramat HaSharon	27	(14)
2023–2024	Ramat HaSharon	27	(5)
2024–2025	Ramat HaSharon	27	(10)

International career
15	Zimbabwe	85	(20)
- * Club domestic league appearances and goals as of 10 July 2025

Emmaculate Msipa (born 7 June 1992) is a Zimbabwean footballer, who plays as a midfielder for Turkish Women's Super League club Fatih Karagümrük and the Zimbabwe women's national team.

== Club career ==
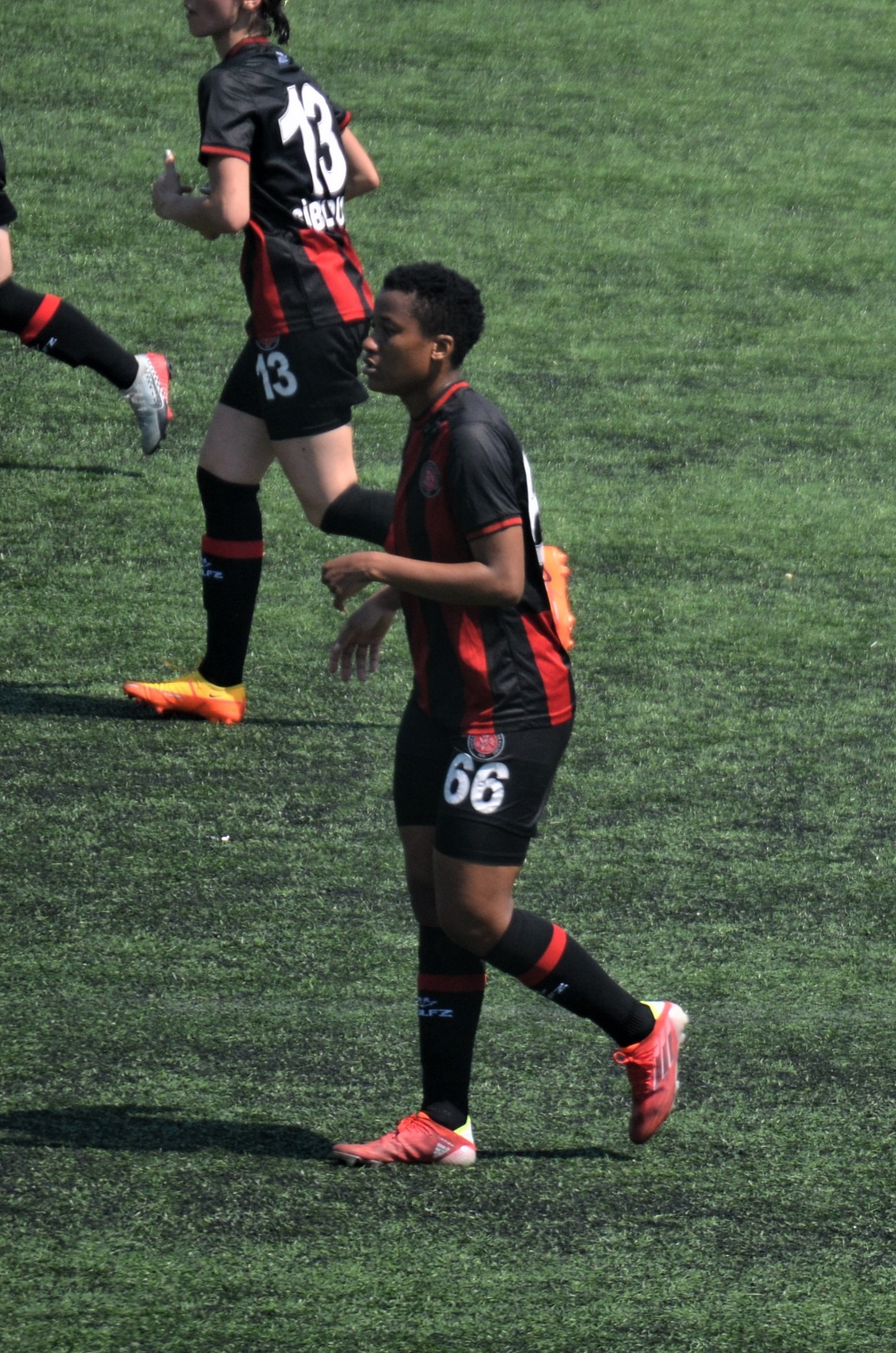
Emmaculate Msipa of Fatih Karagümrük in the 2021-22 Turkish Women's Football Super League play-offs

.

End December 2021, Msipa moved to Turkey and joined the newly established Istanbul club Fatih Karagümrük to play in the 2021-22 Turkcell Women's Super League.

== International career ==
Msipa represented Zimbabwe at the 2016 Summer Olympics. She also played at the 2011 All-Africa Games.
