= Kudakwashe Basopo =

Zimbabwean footballer (born 1990)

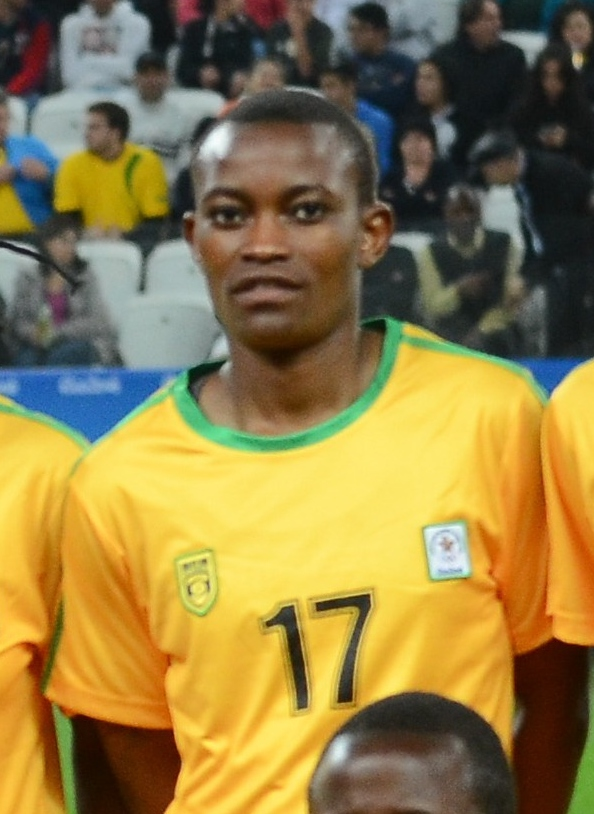
- Basopo at the 2016 Olympics

Personal information
- Date of birth: 18 July 1990 (age 36)
- Place of birth: Harare, Zimbabwe
- Height: 1.62 m (5 ft 4 in)

Team information
- Current team: Nsingizini Hotspur

Senior career*
Years	Team	Apps	(Gls)
2014	Black Rinhos	1	(1)
2023	Harare	1	(1)
2024-2025	Black Mambas	3	(7)
2025	Nsingizini Hotspur	30	(64)

International career
	Zimbabwe	1	(3)
- * Club domestic league appearances and goals

Kudakwashe Basopo (born 18 July 1990) is a Zimbabwean association football player. She is a member of the Zimbabwe women's national football team

She represented her nation in the football competition at the 2016 Summer Olympics.

She scored the nation's first goal in Olympic history against Germany on 3 August. In the match versus Germany it was Rutendo Makore who set up a goal that took the German goalkeeper Almuth Schult by surprise. The ball was rebounded but Basopo made it a goal leaving the score at 6–1 against Zimbabwe.
