= Erina Jeke =

Zimbabwean footballer (born 1990)

Personal information
- Date of birth: 16 September 1990 (age 36)

International career
| Years | Team | Apps | (Gls) |
- Zimbabwe

Erina Jeke (born 16 September 1990) is a Zimbabwean footballer. She represented Zimbabwe in the football competition at the 2016 Summer Olympics.
