= Daisy Kaitano =

Zimbabwean footballer (born 1993)

Personal information
- Date of birth: 20 September 1993 (age 33)
- Place of birth: Harare, Zimbabwe

International career
Years	Team	Apps	(Gls)
- Zimbabwe

Daisy Kaitano (born 20 September 1993) is a Zimbabwean footballer. She represented Zimbabwe in the football competition at the 2016 Summer Olympics.
