= Marjory Nyaumwe =

Zimbabwean footballer (born 1987)

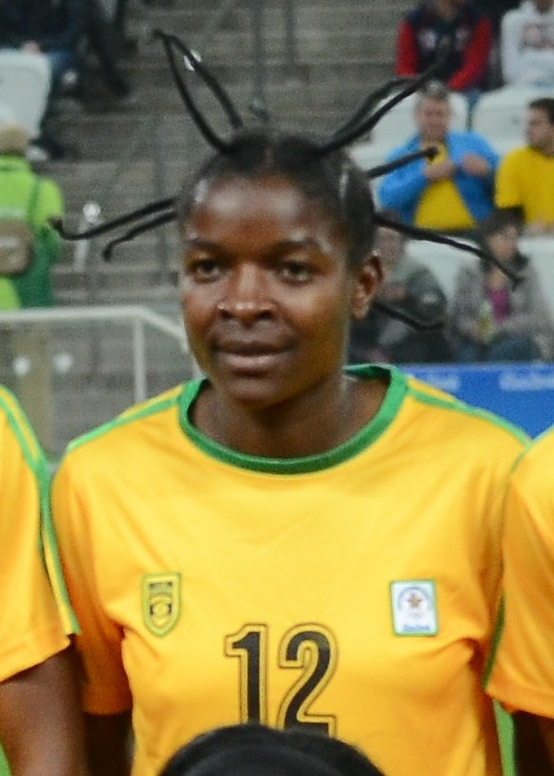
- Nyaumwe at the 2016 Olympics

Personal information
- Date of birth: 10 July 1987 (age 39)
- Place of birth: Zimbabwe
- Height: 1.58 m (5 ft 2 in)
- Position: Midfielder

International career
Years	Team	Apps	(Gls)
- Zimbabwe

Marjory Nyaumwe (born 10 July 1987) is a Zimbabwean association football player.

== Life ==
Nyaumwe was born in 1987. Her strong interest in football was blamed by her parents for her poor school exam results. Nyaumwe agreed to give up the game but a better career was not apparent and she rejoined her team after staying at home for 2010. Her parents saw her success when she was part of the team that won the COSAFA Cup. She received $4,000 from President Robert Mugabe and spent some of this extending her parents' house.

She is a member of the Zimbabwe women's national football team and represented the country in their Olympic debut at the 2016 Summer Olympics.
