= Rudo Neshamba =

Zimbabwean footballer (born 1992)

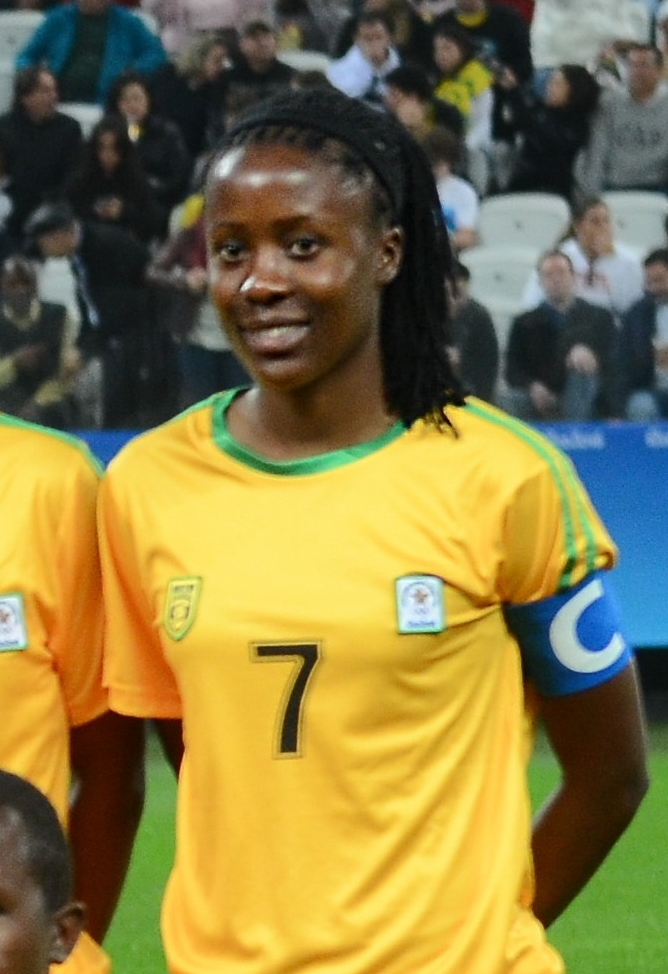
- Neshamba at the 2016 Olympics

Personal information
- Date of birth: 10 February 1992 (age 34)
- Place of birth: Bulawayo, Zimbabwe
- Height: 1.65 m (5 ft 5 in)
- Position: Forward

Team information
- Current team: Ramat HaSharon

Senior career*
Years	Team	Apps	(Gls)
2006–2015	Inline Academy		
2013	→ Double Action Ladies (loan)	6	(14)
2016–2020	Harare City FC		
2021–	Ramat HaSharon		

International career^{‡}
2008–	Zimbabwe		
- * Club domestic league appearances and goals as of 12:05, 30 July 2016 (UTC) ‡ National team caps and goals as of 12:05, 30 July 2016 (UTC)

Rudo Neshamba (born 10 February 1992) is a Zimbabwean footballer who plays for Israeli Ligat Nashim club FC Ramat HaSharon and the Zimbabwe women's national football team.

== Club career ==
Neshamba began playing football in primary school and joined Inline Academy in 2006. In 2013, she spent six months on loan with Double Action Ladies FC in Botswana, where she scored 14 goals in less than half a season.

== International career ==
At the 2008 edition of the Council of Southern Africa Football Associations (COSAFA) Cup, Neshamba made her debut for the Zimbabwe national team. She scored three goals in the 2015 CAF Women's Olympic Qualifying Tournament, including two in the decisive win over Cameroon which clinched Zimbabwe's shock qualification for the final tournament in Brazil.

In March 2016, it was reported that a "chronic" knee injury was jeopardising Neshamba's place at the Olympic games, and that the Zimbabwe Football Association (ZIFA) were failing to pay for her medical care. A London-based expatriate benefactor provided Z$90 for the knee scans she needed.
