= Chido Dzingirai =

Zimbabwean footballer (born 1991)

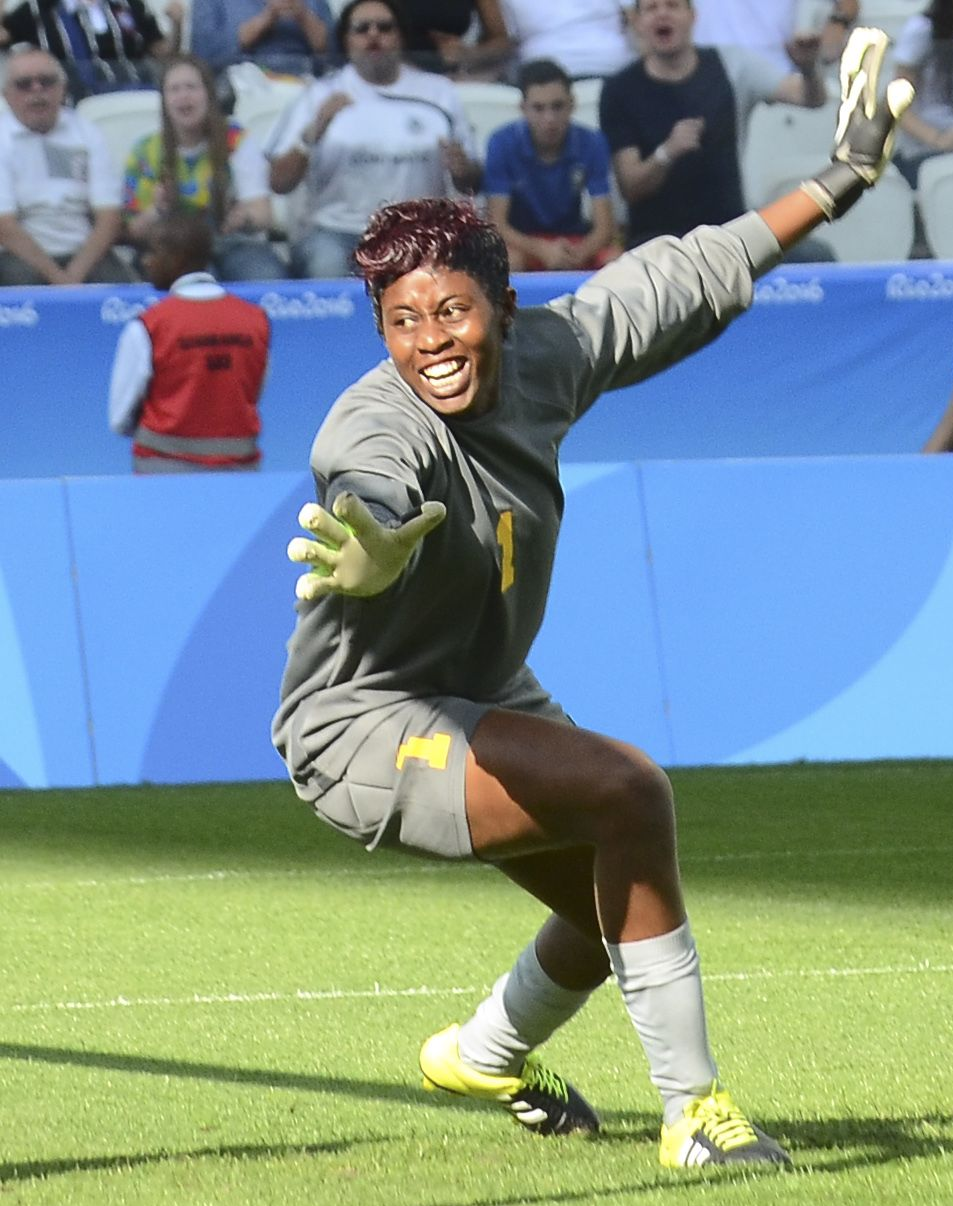

Personal information
- Date of birth: October 25, 1991 (age 35)
- Place of birth: Zimbabwe
- Height: 1.72 m (5 ft 8 in)
- Position: Goalkeeper

Team information
- Current team: Flame Lily Queens

Senior career*
| Years | Team | Apps | (Gls) |
| –2008 | Mbare Queens | | |
| 2008–2011 | Cyclone Stars | | |
| 2011– | Flame Lily Queens | | |

International career^{‡}
| 2008– | Zimbabwe | | |
- * Club domestic league appearances and goals as of 21:56, 2 August 2016 (UTC) ‡ National team caps and goals as of 21:56, 2 August 2016 (UTC)

Chido "Chichie" Dzingirai or Dringirai (born October 25, 1991) is a Zimbabwean footballer who plays for Flame Lily Queens F.C. and the Zimbabwe women's national football team. She began her career as a forward with local team Mbare Queens, before retraining as a goalkeeper and moving to Cyclone Stars in 2008. In 2011, she transferred to Flame Lily Queens, the club of the Zimbabwe Prison Services, who found her a job as a prison officer. She debuted for the Zimbabwe women's national football team ("The Mighty Warriors") in 2008. At the 2015 CAF Women's Olympic Qualifying Tournament, she made multiple saves in the decisive win over Cameroon which clinched Zimbabwe's shock qualification for the final tournament in Brazil.
