= Nobuhle Majika =

Zimbabwean footballer (born 1991)

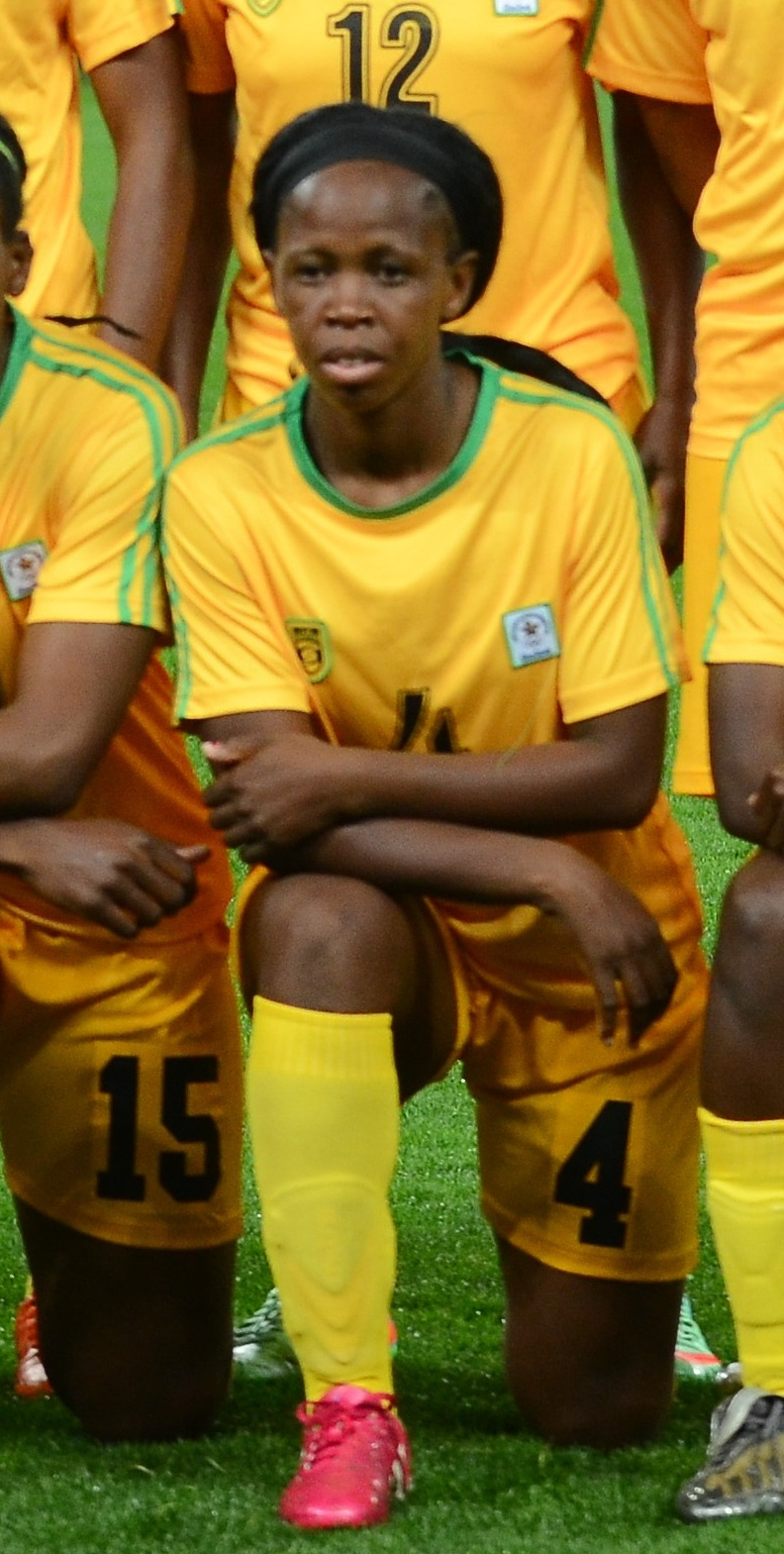
- Majika at the 2016 Olympics

Personal information
- Date of birth: 9 May 1991 (age 35)
- Place of birth: Bulawayo, Zimbabwe
- Height: 1.59 m (5 ft 3 in)
- Position: Defender

International career
| Years | Team | Apps | (Gls) |
- Zimbabwe

Nobuhle Majika (born 9 May 1991) is a Zimbabwean association football defender who plays for the Zimbabwe women's national football team. In 2016, she represented her country in their Olympic debut at the 2016 Summer Olympics in Brazil.

== Personal life ==
She has two brothers George and Moses who also play football. Early in her career she was supported by former footballer Peter Ndlovu who gave her advice and football boots. She is from Bulawayo.
