= Eunice Chibanda =

Zimbabwean footballer (born 1993)

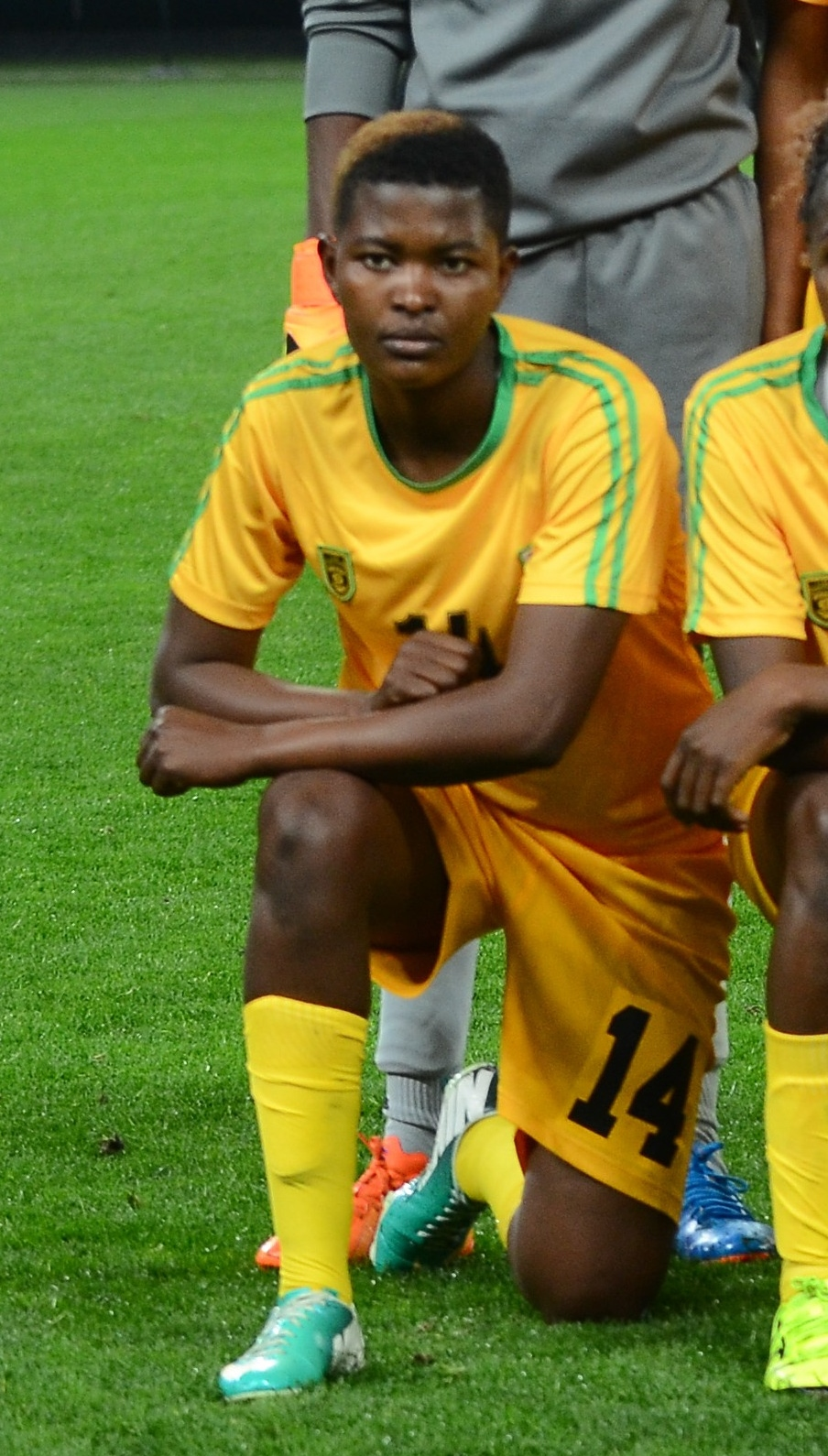
- Chibanda at the 2016 Olympics

Personal information
- Full name: Eunice Chibanda
- Date of birth: 26 March 1993 (age 33)
- Place of birth: Zimbabwe
- Height: 1.63 m (5 ft 4 in)
- Positions: Defender; forward

Team information
- Current team: Black Rhinos

Senior career*
Years	Team	Apps	(Gls)
- Aces Youth Academy
- Black Rhinos

International career
- Zimbabwe
- * Club domestic league appearances and goals

Eunice Chibanda (born 26 March 1993) is a Zimbabwean association football player. She is a member of the Zimbabwe women's national football team and represented the country in their Olympic debut at the 2016 Summer Olympics. She had her debut against Germany in a game the Germans won 6–1.

Chibanda was one of six players to be arrested on suspicion of assaulting the referee after a controversial Cup final in July 2014, which her Black Rhinos team lost to Inline Academy after a penalty shootout. The players were acquitted when the Zimbabwe Football Association failed to bring charges within the required seven-day period.

In May 2015 Chibanda was recalled to the national team after a two-year absence, for a 2015 CAF Women's Olympic Qualifying Tournament fixture against Zambia.
