= Talent Mandaza =

Zimbabwean footballer (born 1985)

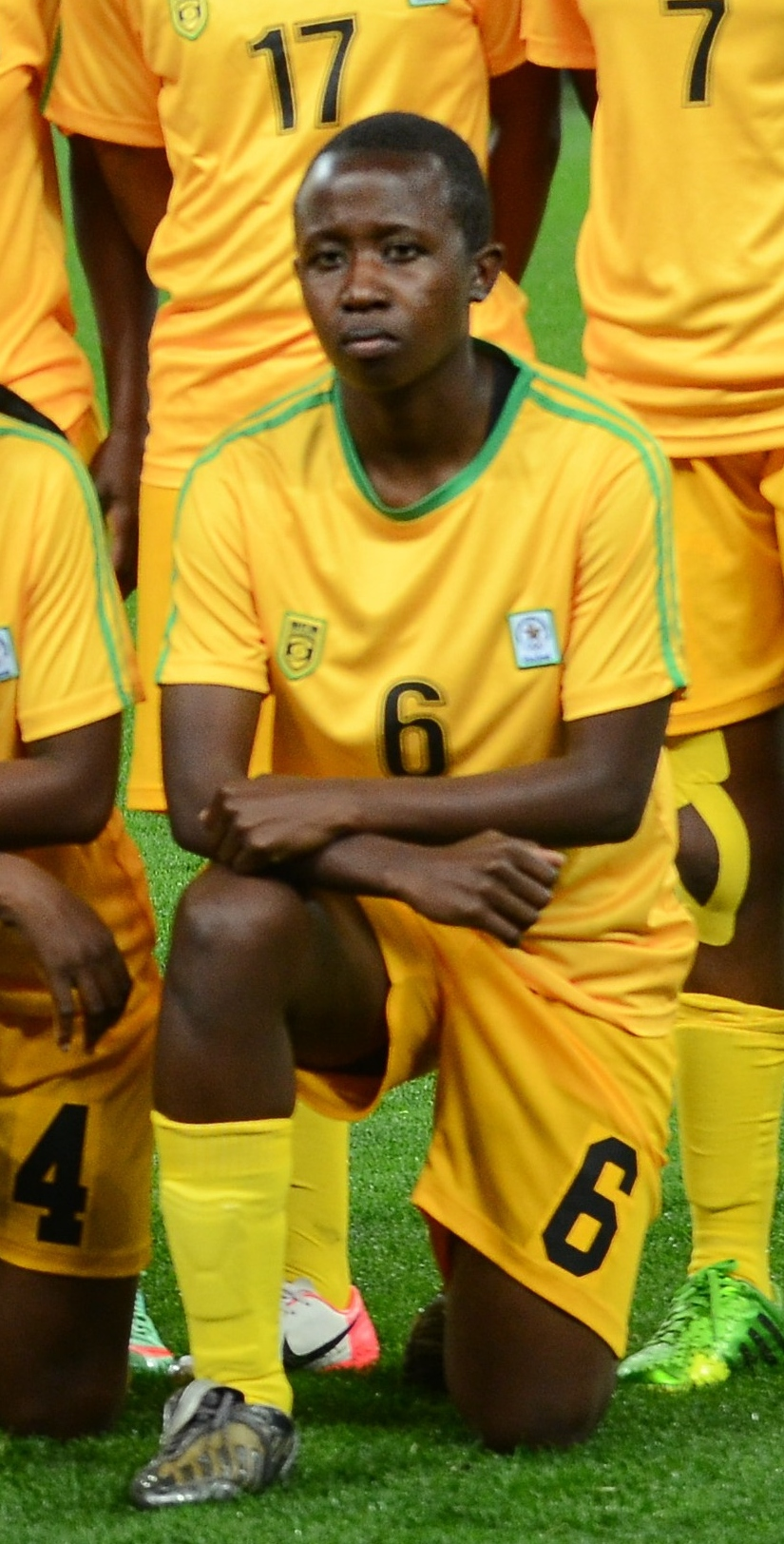
- Mandaza at the 2016 Olympics

Personal information
- Date of birth: 11 December 1985 (age 40)
- Place of birth: Zimbabwe
- Height: 1.58 m (5 ft 2 in)
- Position: Midfielder

International career
Years	Team	Apps	(Gls)
- Zimbabwe

Talent Mandaza (born 11 December 1985) is a Zimbabwean association football player. She is a midfielder who plays for the Black Rhinos Queens. Mandaza is a member of the Zimbabwe women's national football team and represented the country in their Olympic debut at the 2016 Summer Olympics.
