= Zimbabwe women's national football team =

Women's association football team representing Zimbabwe

Zimbabwe
- Nickname: Mighty Warriors
- Association: Zimbabwe Football Association (ZFA)
- Confederation: CAF (Africa)
- Sub-confederation: COSAFA (Southern Africa)
- Head coach: Sithethelelwe Sibanda
- Captain: Nobukhosi Ncube
- FIFA code: ZIM
First colours	Second colours

FIFA ranking
- Current: 127 (16 June 2026)
- Highest: 82 (December 2013)
- Lowest: 130 (March 2025; August 2025)

First international
- Zimbabwe 4–0 Lesotho (Harare, Zimbabwe; 30 July 2000)

Biggest win
- Zimbabwe 15–0 Lesotho (Harare, Zimbabwe; 19 April 2002)

Biggest defeat
- Zimbabwe 0–7 Malawi (Harare, Zimbabwe; 13 October 2026)

African Women's Championship
- Appearances: 4 (first in 1991)
- Best result: 4th (2000)

Summer Olympics
- Appearances: 1 (first in 2016)
- Best result: 12th (2016)

The Zimbabwe women's national football team represents Zimbabwe in international football. It is controlled by the Zimbabwe Football Association (ZFA), the governing body for football in Zimbabwe.

The team represented Zimbabwe at the 2016 Summer Olympics, making it the fourth African country to qualify for the tournament, where they were eliminated in the group stage.

== History ==
Similar to the men's team, the team is known as the "Mighty Warriors", the Zimbabwe women's national team was established in 1991, making it one of the earliest women's national teams on the African continent. They were scheduled to compete in the inaugural African Women's Championship in 1991 but withdrew before the tournament. Their first official match was a 5–2 victory over South Africa in a friendly at FNB Stadium, serving as a curtain-raiser for the men's match between Bafana and Holland.

The team played its first African Women's Championship qualifiers in 2000 against Lesotho, winning 8–0 on aggregate over two legs to qualify for their first continental competition. In Group A, the team drew with Uganda, defeated Réunion 2–1, and lost to South Africa 3–0, advancing to their first-ever semifinals. After losing the next two knockout matches, the team finished fourth.

In 2002, the country hosted the inaugural regional COSAFA Women's Championship. During their first campaign, they topped Group A, recording their biggest win, a 15–0 victory over Lesotho. Another dominant performance, an 11–1 win against Mozambique, saw Zimbabwe reach their first final.

Sixteen years after their first match, Zimbabwe won their first regional title and trophy at the 2011 COSAFA Women's Championship on home soil, defeating three-time defending champions South Africa 1–0 in the final.

After failing to qualify for the Olympics on two occasions, the Mighty Warriors secured their ticket to the 2016 Summer Olympics through the 2015 CAF Women's Olympic qualifying tournament. They defeated rivals Zambia, received a walkover against Ivory Coast, and then triumphed over Cameroon with a 2–2 aggregate score, advancing on away goals. It became the first team, either men's or women's from the country to qualify for the Olympics. In their first tournament, they were defeated in all their matches against Australia, Canada, and Germany, but they were able to score in each of the three games.

== Coaching staff ==
=== Current coaching staff ===
Position	Name	Ref.
Head coach	Sithethelelwe Sibanda	

=== Manager history ===
- Sithethelelwe Sibanda (20??–present)

== Results and fixtures ==
The following is a list of match results in the last 12 months, as well as any future matches that have been scheduled.

Legend

Win Draw Loss Fixture

=== 2025 ===
30 November 2025 3 Nations Tournament	Malawi	1-1	Zambia	Lilongwe, Malawi
15:00	Kabzere 56'		Nanyangwe 65'	Stadium: Bingu National Stadium

2 December 2025 3 Nations Tournament	Zambia	3-1	Zimbabwe	Lilongwe, Malawi
15:00	Phiri 11', 12'; Nanyangwe 43'		Ncube 31'	Stadium: Bingu National Stadium

=== 2026 ===
19 February 2025 COSAFA Women's Championship	Eswatini	0–2	Zimbabwe	Polokwane
12:00		Report	Zvawanda 38'; Makore 53'	Stadium: Old Peter Mokaba Stadium; Referee: Rose Zimba (Malawi)

22 February 2025 COSAFA Women's Championship	Zambia	0–0	Zimbabwe	Seshego, South Africa
15:00		Report		Stadium: Seshego Stadium; Referee: Rose Zimba (Malawi)

24 February 2025 COSAFA Championship	Zimbabwe	1–0	Botswana	Seshego, South Africa
12:00 UTC+2	Makore 70'	Report		Stadium: Seshego Stadium; Referee: Nonjabulo Ndlela (South Africa)

27 February 2025 COSAFA SF	South Africa	1–1 (4–2 p)	Zimbabwe	Polokwane, South Africa
15:00	Majiya 39'	Report	Chinyerere 11'	Stadium: New Peter Mokaba Stadium; Referee: Mathapelo Morake (Lesotho)
	Penalties
	Majiya (penalty scored); Mokoma (penalty scored); Pila (penalty scored); October (penalty scored)		(penalty scored) Chinyerere; (penalty scored) Kondo; (penalty missed) Sipini; (penalty missed) Ndlovu

1 March 2025 COSAFA 3rd	Zambia	3–1	Zimbabwe	Polokwane, South Africa
12:00	A. Phiri 4', 28'; Chipasula 45'	Report	Makore 45+2'	Stadium: New Peter Mokaba Stadium; Referee: Élodie Livaharivony (Madagascar)

== Players ==
=== Current squad ===
- The following is the squad named for the 2025 COSAFA Women's Championship on 16 2026.

No.	Pos.	Player	Date of birth (age)	Club
1	GK	Delight Matigwene	23 April 2005 (aged 20)	(Zimbabwe Football Association) Chapungu Queens
2	DF	Fiona Kabera	10 June 1998 (aged 27)	(Zimbabwe Football Association) Conduit Soccer Academy
3	DF	Melinda Mapasure	25 May 2005 (aged 20)	(Zimbabwe Football Association) Faithdrive Academy
4	DF	Tumbare Egness	31 July 1993 (aged 32)	(Zimbabwe Football Association) Correctional Queens
5	DF	Bridget Mutarwa	19 July 1997 (aged 28)	(Zimbabwe Football Association) Herentals Queens
6	DF	Nokukhanya Ndlovu	4 April 2000 (aged 25)	(Zimbabwe Football Association) Platinum Royals
7	FW	Anitha Ncube	7 January 2006 (aged 20)	(Zimbabwe Football Association) Kwekwe Queens
8	MF	Macgirl Sipini	15 June 2000 (aged 25)	(Zimbabwe Football Association) Harare City Queens
9	DF	Nobukhosi Ncube (Captain)	17 February 1993 (aged 33)	(Zimbabwe Football Association) Chapungu Queens
10	MF	Ennety Chemhere	19 October 2002 (aged 23)	(Zimbabwe Football Association) Platinum Royals
11	MF	Daisy Kaitano	4 July 1995 (aged 30)	(Zimbabwe Football Association) Black Rhinos Queens
12	MF	Caroline Mangwai	7 June 2004 (aged 21)	(Zimbabwe Football Association) Black Rhinos Queens
13	DF	Christobel Katona	13 February 1999 (aged 27)	(Zimbabwe Football Association) Black Rhinos Queens
14	FW	Ethel Chinyere	12 June 1996 (aged 29)	(Zimbabwe Football Association) Chapungu Queens
15	FW	Rutendo Makore	30 September 1992 (aged 33)	(Zimbabwe Football Association) Black Rhinos Queens
16	GK	Vanessa Lunga	16 June 1994 (aged 31)	(Zimbabwe Football Association) Platinum Royals
17	FW	Privilege Mupeti	29 September 1997 (aged 28)	(Zimbabwe Football Association) Black Rhinos Queens
18	DF	Sheila Antonio	27 August 1999 (aged 26)	(Zimbabwe Football Association) Chapungu Queens
19	MF	Shyline Dambamurono	4 April 2000 (aged 25)	(Zimbabwe Football Association) Herentals Queens
20	MF	Bethel Kondo	20 January 2006 (aged 20)	(Zimbabwe Football Association) Herentals Queens
21	DF	Alice Moyo	26 March 1993 (aged 32)	(Zimbabwe Football Association) Herentals Queens
22	GK	Cynthia Shonga	18 June 2000 (aged 25)	(Zimbabwe Football Association) Herentals Queens
23	FW	Praynance Zvawanda	7 February 2003 (aged 23)	(Zimbabwe Football Association) Herentals Queens

=== Recent call-ups ===
The following players had been called up to a squad in 12 months preceding the above draft.

Pos.	Player	Date of birth (age)	Caps	Goals	Club	Latest call-up

^{INJ} Injured player.
^{PRE} Preliminary squad.
^{RET} Retired from international football.
^{SUS} Suspended for the next match.
^{WD} Withdrew from the squad due to non-injury issue.
^{QUA} Placed in quarantine after a contact with COVID-19.

== Competitive record ==
=== FIFA Women's World Cup ===
FIFA Women's World Cup record										Qualification record						
Host nation(s) and year	Round	Pos	Pld	W	D	L	GF	GA	Squad	Outcome	Pld	W	D	L	GF	GA
(China) 1991	Withdrew									Withdrew						
(Sweden) 1995	Did not enter									Did not enter						
(United States) 1999	Did not enter									Did not enter						
(United States) 2003	Did not qualify									The 2002 African Women's Championship served as the qualifying tournament						
(China) 2007	Withdrew									Withdrew						
(Germany) 2011	Did not enter									Did not enter						
(Canada) 2015	Did not qualify									The 2014 African Women's Championship served as the qualifying tournament						
(France) 2019	Did not qualify									The 2018 Women's Africa Cup of Nations served as the qualifying tournament						
(Australia) (New Zealand) 2023	Did not qualify									The 2022 Women's Africa Cup of Nations served as the qualifying tournament						
(Brazil) 2027	To be determined									The 2026 Women's Africa Cup of Nations will serve as the qualifying tournament						
Total	–	0/10	–	–	–	–	–	–	–	Total	–	–	–	–	–	–

=== Summer Olympics ===
Summer Olympics record										Qualification record						
Host nation(s) and year	Round	Pos	Pld	W	D	L	GF	GA	Squad	Outcome	Pld	W	D	L	GF	GA
(United States) 1996	Did not enter									The 1995 FIFA Women's World Cup served as the qualifying tournament						
(Australia) 2000	Did not enter									The 1999 FIFA Women's World Cup served as the qualifying tournament						
(Greece) 2004	Did not qualify									Second round	2	0	1	1	0	1
(China) 2008	Did not qualify									Second round	3	1	0	2	9	6
(United Kingdom) 2012	Did not enter									Did not enter						
(Brazil) 2016	Group stage	12th	3	0	0	3	3	15	squad	Fourth round	6	4	0	2	10	4
(Japan) 2020	Withdrew									Second round	1	0	0	1	0	5
(France) 2024	Suspended									Suspended						
(United States) 2028	To be determined									To be determined						
Total	–	1/8	3	0	0	3	3	15	–	Total	12	5	1	6	19	16

=== Women's Africa Cup of Nations ===
Women's Africa Cup of Nations record										Qualification record						
Host nation(s) and year	Round	Pos	Pld	W	D	L	GF	GA	Squad	Outcome	Pld	W	D	L	GF	GA
1991	Withdrew									No qualifying tournament						
1995	Did not enter									No qualifying tournament						
(Nigeria) 1998	Did not enter									Did not enter						
(South Africa) 2000	Fourth place	4th	5	1	1	3	8	17	squad	Main round	2	2	0	0	4	0
(Nigeria) 2002	Group stage	6th	3	0	2	1	2	4	squad	Main round	2	2	0	0	10	0
(South Africa) 2004	Group stage	5th	3	1	1	1	3	4	squad	Main round	2	2	0	0	7	0
(Nigeria) 2006	Withdrew									Withdrew						
(Equatorial Guinea) 2008	Did not qualify									Second round	4	2	0	2	7	9
(South Africa) 2010	Did not enter									Did not enter						
(Equatorial Guinea) 2012	Did not qualify									First round	4	2	0	2	3	7
(Namibia) 2014	Did not qualify									Second round	4	2	0	2	3	3
(Cameroon) 2016	Group stage	7th	3	0	1	2	0	3	squad	Main round	4	3	1	0	7	4
(Ghana) 2018	Did not qualify									Second round	4	3	0	1	6	2
(Morocco) 2022	Did not qualify									Second round	4	3	0	1	9	4
(Morocco) 2024	Did not enter									Did not enter						
(Morocco) 2026	To be determined									To be determined						
Total	–	4/16	14	2	5	7	13	28	–	Total	30	21	1	8	56	29

== See also ==
- List of women's national association football teams
- Women's football in Zimbabwe
