= West Middle School =

West Middle School may refer to one of several schools:

- West Middle School (Greenwood Village, Colorado), USA
- West Middle School (Lawrence, Kansas), USA
- West Middle School (Liberal, Kansas), USA
- West Middle School (Columbia, Missouri), USA
- West Middle School (West, Texas), USA
- Fort Zumwalt West Middle School (O'Fallon), USA

== See also ==
- Grand Blanc West Middle School, Michigan, USA
- Julius West Middle School, Rockville, Maryland, USA
- Tri-West Middle School, Lizton, Indiana, USA
- DeSoto West Middle School (DeSoto, Texas), USA
- Franklin Township Middle School West, Indianapolis, Indiana, USA
- Wayzata West Middle School, Hennepin County, Minnesota, USA
- Portage West Middle School, Portage, Michigan, USA
- Gosforth West Middle School, Gosforth, Newcastle upon Tyne, England
