= Portage Northern High School =

High school in Portage, Michigan, United States of America

Location
- 1000 Idaho Ave. Portage, Michigan 49024-1233; 42.2345°N 85.6007°W

Information
- School type: Public
- Founded: 1965
- School district: Portage Public Schools
- Superintendent: Johnny Edwards
- Principal: Jason Messenger
- Teaching staff: 60.27 (FTE)
- Grades: 9-12
- Enrollment: 1,212 (2024-25)
- Student to teacher ratio: 20.99
- Language: English
- Area: Urban
- Color
- Mascot: Huskies
- Website: Portage Northern High School

Student assessments
- 2021–22 school year Change vs. prior year

M-STEP 11th grade proficiency rates (Science / Social Studies)
- Advanced %: 21.9 / 12.5
- Proficient %: 24.0 / 27.8
- PR. Proficient %: 13.9 / 44.4
- Not Proficient %: 40.3 / 15.3

Average test scores
- SAT Total: 1034.7 (▼ −21.1)

Portage Northern High School is a high school in Portage, Michigan. Northern High School serves 1,235 students from ninth through twelfth grades. In addition to meeting the regular education needs of students living in the PNHS attendance area, the school also houses several special education programs that address the needs of students throughout the Portage district. In addition, Northern is one of nine Michigan high schools currently authorized to offer the International Baccalaureate Diploma Program, a rigorous curriculum for grades 11 and 12 that focuses on globalism and interdisciplinary study.

== History ==
Portage Northern was built in 1965 to accommodate overcrowding at Portage Central High School, the school's crosstown rival. In 2007, Portage voters approved a bond issue that funded major renovations at Portage Northern as well as an entirely new Central High School. The renovations concluded in 2011.

== Student activities ==
=== Arts ===
Portage Northern has an arts program with a band, choir, orchestra and visual arts program.

== Athletics ==
Portage Northern High School has numerous Varsity and club teams, including: American football, soccer, baseball, softball, swimming, diving, marching band, tennis, golf, volleyball, basketball, wrestling, lacrosse, cross country running, track, competitive cheerleading, hockey, gymnastics, and water polo. Portage Northern competes in the west division of the Southwest Michigan Athletic Conference.

== Notable alumni ==
- Keegan Bach, record producer, songwriter, and producer
- Brandon Bye, member of the New England Revolution, part of Major League Soccer
- Steve Carra, member of the Michigan House of Representatives
- Andrew Evans, competed in the 2016 Summer Olympics in the discus throw event
- Timothy Granaderos, model and actor known for 13 Reasons Why
- Tommy Henry, Major League Baseball player
- Nick Keizer, NFL player for the Kansas City Chiefs
- Scott Oudsema, professional tennis player
- Leon Roberts, Major League Baseball player
- Matthew A. Scogin, president of Hope College in Holland, Michigan
- Max Schuemann, Major League Baseball player
- Anthony Tyus III, NFL running back for the Carolina Panthers
