= Lindsay Tarpley =

American soccer player (born 1983)

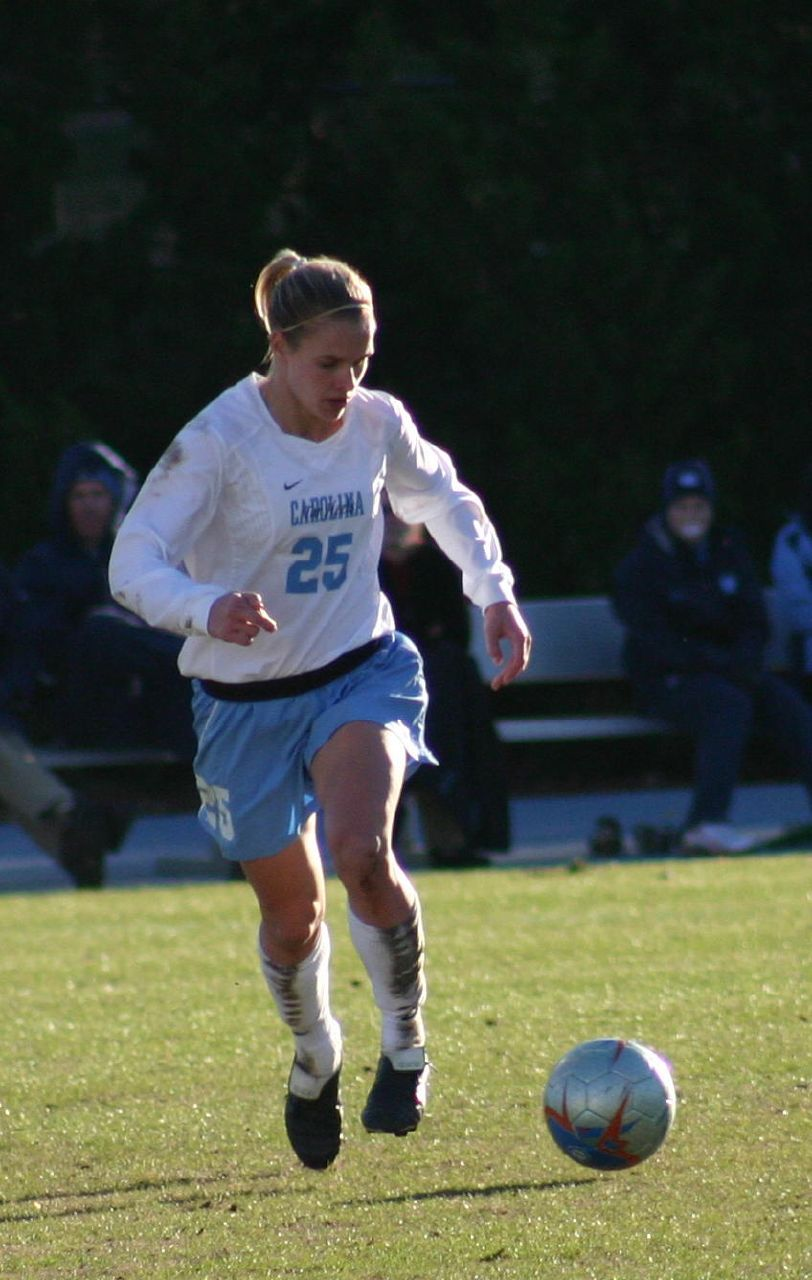
- Tarpley with North Carolina in 2005

Personal information
- Full name: Lindsay Ann Tarpley Snow
- Birth name: Lindsay Ann Tarpley
- Date of birth: September 22, 1983 (age 43)
- Place of birth: Madison, Wisconsin, United States
- Height: 5 ft 6 in (1.68 m)
- Positions: Forward; winger

College career
Years	Team	Apps	(Gls)
2002–2005	North Carolina Tar Heels		

Senior career*
Years	Team	Apps	(Gls)
1998–1999	Kalamazoo Quest		
2005	New Jersey Wildcats	5	(2)
2009	Chicago Red Stars	17	(4)
2010	Saint Louis Athletica	5	(1)
2010	Boston Breakers	17	(3)
2011	magicJack	3	(0)

International career^{‡}
2002	United States U-19	26	(24)
2003	United States U-21	8	(4)
2003–2011	United States	125	(32)
Medal record
Women's soccer
Representing United States
Olympic Games
Gold medal – first place	2004 Athens	Team competition
Gold medal – first place	2008 Beijing	Team competition
World Cup
Bronze medal – third place	2007 China	Team competition
- * Club domestic league appearances and goals as of July 5, 2012 (UTC) ‡ National team caps and goals as of July 5, 2012 (UTC)

Lindsay Ann Tarpley Snow (née Tarpley; born September 22, 1983) is an American former professional soccer forward and midfielder. She is a two-time Olympic gold medalist, winning gold at the 2004 Athens and 2008 Beijing Summer Olympics, and was a member of the United States national team that finished third at the 2007 Women's World Cup in China.

== Early life ==
Born in Madison, Wisconsin, Tarpley grew up in Kalamazoo, Michigan, and attended Portage Central High School from 1998 to 2002. During her freshman season, she helped her school's women's soccer team reach the state semi-finals. In the following spring, she led her team to an undefeated season and the state championship. Against Bishop Foley Catholic High School in the final match, she scored her team's first goal and assisted on her team's other two, including the winning shot in the penalty shootout. She received several honors during her time there, including being named the 2002 Michigan Gatorade Player of the Year and the 2002 U.S. Soccer Chevrolet Young Female Player of the Year, in addition to being a 1999 NSCAA All-American and a Parade All-American in 2001 and 2002. She also played varsity basketball for Portage Central, starting at point guard during all four of her seasons.

While in high school, Tarpley played for W-League side Kalamazoo Quest in 1998 and 1999.

=== North Carolina Tar Heels ===
In the autumn of 2002, Tarpley enrolled at the University of North Carolina. While there, she majored in communications and minored in coaching. She was a student-athlete, and competed with the university's North Carolina Tar Heels women's soccer team. In her first season with the team, she was named ACC Rookie of the Year and the Soccer America and Soccer Buzz National Freshman of the Year.

During her sophomore season, Tarpley led the nation in total points (goals and assists) while leading the Tar Heels to the 2003 NCAA Women's Soccer Championship. Against Connecticut Huskies in the finals, she scored two goals and had two assists en route to winning the title. She received numerous honors for her performance throughout the 2003 season, including ACC Player of the Year and Player of the Tournament, National Player of the Year, and several All-America team honors.

Injuries interfered with Tarpley's junior and senior seasons, which reduced her playing time. Tarpley still managed to be named to the All-ACC and NSCAA All-America teams in both seasons.

Tarpley finished her North Carolina career with 59 goals and 59 assists. Her number 25 jersey was retired by the school in February 2006 during the halftime of a North Carolina Tar Heels men's basketball game.

== Club career ==
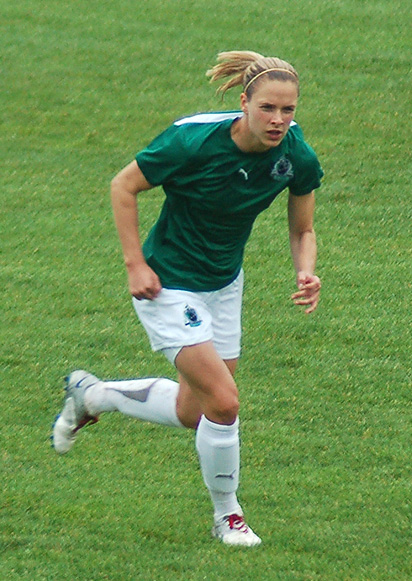
Tarpley with the St.Louis Athletica in 2010.

=== W-League ===
Tarpley played for the New Jersey Wildcats in 2005, where she played alongside Tobin Heath, Christine Latham, Karina LeBlanc, Heather O'Reilly, Cat Whitehill, Rachel Yankey, and a number of other international players. She played in five games (374 minutes) for the club, and scored two goals with two assists.

=== Women's Professional Soccer ===
Upon the creation of a new top-flight women's league in the United States, Tarpley agreed to join Women's Professional Soccer. She was allocated to Chicago Red Stars along with USWNT players Carli Lloyd and Kate Markgraf. In the inaugural 2009 Women's Professional Soccer season, Tarpley appeared in 17 games (16 starts, 1321 total minutes) and scored four goals and four assists.

On January 15, 2010, Lindsay was traded to the Saint Louis Athletica in exchange for goalkeeper Jillian Loyden. With the Athletica, she joined former North Carolina Tar Heel standouts Lori Chalupny, Kendall Fletcher and Kristina Larsen.

She became a free agent on June 1, 2010, with the dissolution of the Saint Louis Athletica. On June 3, it was announced by the Boston Breakers that they had signed Tarpley. She then signed for magicJack ahead of the 2011 Women's Professional Soccer season.

Following her ACL injury in 2011, Tarpley was selected by the Chicago Red Stars in the 2013 NWSL Supplemental Draft but waived by the team in March 2014.

== International career ==
Tarpley began her international career representing the United States on the U-16 Girls National Team. From there, she successfully moved to the United States U-19 team in 2002. She played in the 2002 FIFA U-19 Women's World Championship, the first FIFA-sanctioned youth tournament for women, and scored the title-clinching goal in extra time against Canada. She made 26 total appearances and scored 24 goals.

Tarpley soon moved to the United States U-21 team, where she made 8 appearances and scored 4 goals. Half of her goals were scored at the 2003 Nordic Cup, while the other half was at the 2005 Nordic Cup.

Tarpley first appeared for the senior team on January 12, 2003, against Japan. Her first (and second) goal came a little over a year later on January 30, 2004, against Sweden. She appeared in the 2004 and 2008 editions of the Olympic Games, winning a gold medal on each trip. She has also played in the 2007 FIFA Women's World Cup, in which the United States finished third. She earned her 100th cap on July 16, 2008, against Brazil in the last game before the 2008 Olympics, the 23rd player in USWNT history to reach this feat.

A torn anterior cruciate ligament sustained in a warm-up match with Japan saw Tarpley ruled out of the 2011 FIFA Women's World Cup.

=== International goals ===
Key (expand for notes on "international goals" and sorting)
Location	Geographic location of the venue where the competition occurred Sorted by country name first, then by city name
Lineup	Start – played entire match on minute (off player) – substituted on at the minute indicated, and player was substituted off at the same time off minute (on player) – substituted off at the minute indicated, and player was substituted on at the same time (c) – captain Sorted by minutes played
Goal in match	Goal of total goals by the player in the match Sorted by total goals followed by goal number
#	NumberOfGoals.goalNumber scored by the player in the match (alternate notation to Goal in match)
Min	The minute in the match the goal was scored. For list that include caps, blank indicates played in the match but did not score a goal.
Assist/pass	The ball was passed by the player, which assisted in scoring the goal. This column depends on the availability and source of this information.
penalty or pk	Goal scored on penalty-kick which was awarded due to foul by opponent. (Goals scored in penalty-shoot-out, at the end of a tied match after extra-time, are not included.)
Score	The match score after the goal was scored. Sorted by goal difference, then by goal scored by the player's team
Result	The final score. Sorted by goal difference in the match, then by goal difference in penalty-shoot-out if it is taken, followed by goal scored by the player's team in the match, then by goal scored in the penalty-shoot-out. For matches with identical final scores, match ending in extra-time without penalty-shoot-out is a tougher match, therefore precede matches that ended in regulation
aet	The score at the end of extra-time; the match was tied at the end of 90' regulation
pso	Penalty-shoot-out score shown in parentheses; the match was tied at the end of extra-time
	Green background color – exhibition or closed door international friendly match
	Yellow background color – match at an invitational tournament
	Red background color – Olympic women's football qualification match
	Orange background color – Continental Games or regional tournament
	Pink background color – Olympic women's football tournament
NOTE on background colors: Continental Games or regional tournament are sometimes also qualifier for World Cup or Olympics; information depends on the source such as the player's federation. NOTE: some keys may not apply for a particular football player

goal	Date	Location	Opponent	Lineup	#	Min	Assist/pass	Score	Result	Competition
1	2004-01-30	Shenzhen, China	China	off 75' (on Hucles)	2.1	51	Abby Wambach	2–0	3–0	Four Nations Tournament
2	2004-01-30	Shenzhen, China	China	off 75' (on Hucles)	2.2	66	Kate Markgraf	3–0	3–0	Four Nations Tournament
3	2004-02-03	Shenzhen, China	Canada	Start	1.1	13	Shannon MacMillan	1–0	2–0	Friendly
4	2004-02-27	Heredia, Costa Rica	Haiti	on 46' (off Boxx)	1.1	63	unassisted	5–0	8–0	Olympic qualification
5	2004-03-05	Heredia, Costa Rica	Mexico	off 60' (on Hamm)	1.1	45	Cindy Parlow	1–2	3–2	Olympic qualification
6	2004-03-14	Ferreiras, Portugal	France	on 46' (off Foudy)	1.1	47	Cindy Parlow	5–0	5–1	Algarve Cup
7	2004-03-20	Faro, Portugal	Norway	off 68' (on Wagner)	1.1	42	Abby Wambach	3–1	4–1	Algarve Cup
8	2004-08-26	Athens, Greece	Brazil	off 91' (on O'Reilly)	1.1	39	Brandi Chastain	1–0	2–1	Olympics: final
9	2006-03-13	Faro, Portugal	France	off 56' (on Lloyd)	1.1	50	unassisted	3–0	4–1	Algarve Cup
10	2006-09-13	Rochester, United States	Mexico	off 67' (on Kai)	1.1	22	Aly Wagner	2–1	3–1	Friendly
11	2006-10-01	Carson, United States	Chinese Taipei	off 63' (on Rapinoe)	2.1	22	unassisted	2–0	10–0	Friendly
12	2006-10-01	Carson, United States	Chinese Taipei	off 63' (on Rapinoe)	2.2	27	Aly Wagner	3–0	10–0	Friendly
13	2006-11-02	Suwon, South Korea	Netherlands	on 46' (off Lilly)	1.1	27	Natasha Kai	1–0	2–0	Peace Queen Cup: Group B
14	2007-04-14	Foxborough, United States	Mexico	off 68' (on O'Reilly)	1.1	33	unassisted	2–0	5–0	Friendly
15	2007-05-12	Frisco, United States	Canada	off 62' (on O'Reilly)	1.1	13	Heather Mitts	2–1	6–2	Friendly
16	2007-08-12	Chicago, United States	New Zealand	off 64' (on Kai)	1.1	57	unassisted	4–0	6–1	Friendly
17	2007-08-25	Carson, United States	Finland	Start	1.1	68	Christie Rampone	3–0	4–0	Friendly
18	2008-01-16	Guangzhou, China	Canada	on 64' (off Lloyd)	2.1	71	Heather O'Reilly	3–0	4–0	Four Nations Tournament
19	2008-01-16	Guangzhou, China	Canada	on 64' (off Lloyd)	2.2	78	Amy Rodriguez	4–0	4–0	Four Nations Tournament
20	2008-01-18	Guangzhou, China	Finland	Start	2.1	37	Abby Wambach	1–0	4–1	Four Nations Tournament
21	2008-01-18	Guangzhou, China	Finland	Start	2.2	39	Abby Wambach	2–0	4–1	Four Nations Tournament
22	2008-03-05	Albufeira, Portugal	China	off 45' (on Heath)	1.1	5	Carli Lloyd	1–0	4–0	Algarve Cup: Group B
23	2008-03-07	Alvor, Portugal	Italy	off 45' (on Heath)	1.1	6	Lauren Cheney	1–0	2–0	Algarve Cup: Group B
24	2008-05-03	Birmingham, United States	Australia	off 74' (on O'Reilly)	2.1	28	unassisted	1–1	5–4	Friendly
25	2008-05-03	Birmingham, United States	Australia	off 74' (on O'Reilly)	2.2	42	Natasha Kai	3–1	5–4	Friendly
26	2008-05-10	Washington, United States	Canada	off 70' (on Osborne)	1.1	23	Abby Wambach	1–0	6–0	Friendly
27	2008-07-02	Fredrikstad, Norway	Norway	off 81' (on Rodriguez)	1.1	4	Abby Wambach	1–0	4–0	Friendly
28	2008-08-12	Shenyang, China	New Zealand	Start	1.1	56	unassisted	3–0	4–0	Olympics: Group G
29	2008-11-01	Richmond, United States	Korea Republic	Start	1.1	48	Aly Wagner	3–0	3–1	Friendly
30	2009-05-25	Toronto, Canada	Canada	on 61' (off Rapinoe)	1.1	77	unassisted	3–0	4–0	Friendly
31	2011-01-23	Chongqing, China	Canada	on 31' (off Rapinoe)	1.1	70	Cheney	2–1	2–1	Four Nations Tournament
32	2011-03-04	Santo Antonio, Portugal	Norway	Start	1.1	33	Amy Rodriguez	1–0	2–0	Algarve Cup: Group A

== Honors and awards ==
United States

- Olympic Games Gold Medal: 2004, 2008
- FIFA Women's World Cup:Third Place: 2007 China

North Carolina Tar Heels

- NCAA Women's Soccer Championship: 2003

Individual

- National Freshman of the Year: 2002
- NCAA Division I Scoring Leader: 2003
- College Soccer Player of the Year: 2003

== Personal life ==
Tarpley married B.J. Snow in 2008. In 2011, Snow was hired as the head coach for the UCLA Bruins women's soccer team. In July 2012, Tarpley and Snow had their first child, a son.
