= Kirt Ojala =

American baseball player (born 1968)

- Pitcher
- Born: December 24, 1968 (age 57); Kalamazoo, Michigan, U.S.
- Batted: Left Threw: Left

MLB debut
- August 18, 1997, for the Florida Marlins

Last MLB appearance
- May 4, 1999, for the Florida Marlins

MLB statistics
- Win–loss record: 3–10
- Earned run average: 4.71
- Strikeouts: 99
- Stats at Baseball Reference

Teams
- Florida Marlins (1997–1999)

Kirt Stanley Ojala (born December 24, 1968) is an American former Major League Baseball (MLB) left-handed pitcher who played for the Florida Marlins from 1997 to 1999, and is remembered for being the pitcher who gave up the 400th career home run to Barry Bonds.

== Early life ==
Kirt Stanley Ojala was born on December 24, 1968, in Kalamazoo, Michigan. He attended Portage Central High School in Portage, Michigan, where he excelled in baseball.

== College career ==
Ojala attended University of Michigan. In 1989, he played collegiate summer baseball with the Harwich Mariners of the Cape Cod Baseball League.

== Professional career ==
=== Draft and minor leagues ===
He was selected by the New York Yankees in the 4th round of the 1990 MLB draft.

=== Florida Marlins (1997–1999) ===
A knuckleball specialist, Ojala pitched mostly in long relief, although he made 5 starts for the Marlins in 1997 after being called up from the minor league Charlotte Knights, and 13 the following year. On August 23, 1998, he gave up a solo home run to Bonds in the top of the third inning in Pro Player Stadium, giving Bonds 400 homers for his career.

On September 16, 1998, Ojala became one of only 50 major league pitchers to strike out four batters in a single inning. He spent time in the Cincinnati Reds organization prior to the Marlins. Following his release by Florida, he briefly was a member of the Boston Red Sox. He finished with a career record of 3 wins and 10 losses and a career batting average of .121.

== See also ==
- List of Major League Baseball single-inning strikeout leaders
