= 2010 WPS All-Star Game =

- Event: Women's Professional Soccer All-Star Game
Abby's XI	Marta's XI
2	5
- Date: June 30, 2010
- Venue: KSU Soccer Stadium; Kennesaw, Georgia
- Referee: Margaret Domka
- Attendance: 4,610

The 2010 Women's Professional Soccer All-Star Game was the second WPS All-Star Game, taking place on June 30, 2010. Thirty-six players were divided into two teams with the top US vote-getter (Abby Wambach) and the top international vote-getter (Marta) as captains. Marta's XI defeated Abby's XI by five to two.

== Atlanta Beat named host ==
WPS awarded the 2010 All-Star Game to Atlanta, Georgia in a press release on March 22, 2010. The venue was KSU Soccer Stadium, home of the Atlanta Beat.

Atlanta, with its wonderful new stadium built specifically for WPS, will be a fantastic venue for our second WPS All-Star Game.

— Tonya Antonucci

== WPS All-Stars ==
=== Voting ===
Twenty-two of the thirty-six WPS All-Stars were chosen by vote. 25% of the total vote came from fans voting online, 25% from media, 25% from coaches (who were prohibited from voting for their team's players), and 25% from players. The results of the voting were released on June 9, 2010.

The top three fan picks this year were Wambach, Marta, and Hope Solo. Three players - Wambach, Marta, and Kelly Smith - topped out the coach's voting with 100% of coaches voting for them. Likewise, two players - Sonia Bompastor and Eniola Aluko - got 100% of the media vote. Along with those six players, Shannon Boxx, Christine Sinclair, Lori Lindsey, and Amy LePeilbet rounded out the top ten.

=== At-Large Selections ===
The remaining fourteen players on the All-Star rosters were selected by WPS Commissioner Tonya Antonucci and the two All-Star coaches Albertin Montoya and Paul Riley, who were the coaches of the two teams topping the standings at the time, on June 14.

== 2010 All-Star Rosters ==
Bold indicates Starting XI's from pick-'em results
Italic indicates players who missed the All-Star game due to injury
* replacement player

=== Abby's XI ===
Note: Flags indicate national team as defined under FIFA eligibility rules; some limited exceptions apply. Players may hold more than one non-FIFA nationality.

No.	Pos.	Nation	Player
1	GK	(United States) USA	**Hope Solo**
3	DF	(United States) USA	**Amy LePeilbet**
4	DF	(United States) USA	Angie Kerr
6	MF	(United States) USA	**Lori Lindsey**
7	MF	(United States) USA	**Shannon Boxx**
8	DF	(United States) USA	**Tina Ellertson**
9	FW	(England) ENG	**Eniola Aluko**
10	MF	(United States) USA	**Heather O'Reilly**
11	FW	(United States) USA	**Lauren Cheney**

No.	Pos.	Nation	Player
14	MF	(England) ENG	Karen Carney
17	MF	(United States) USA	**Lori Chalupny**
19	FW	(United States) USA	Kelley O'Hara
20	FW	(United States) USA	**Abby Wambach**
21	MF	(Finland) FIN	Laura Kalmari
66	FW	(United States) USA	Natasha Kai
84	DF	(United States) USA	**Cat Whitehill**
85	GK	(United States) USA	Jillian Loyden
—	DF	(United States) USA	Kate Markgraf

=== Marta's XI ===
Note: Flags indicate national team as defined under FIFA eligibility rules; some limited exceptions apply. Players may hold more than one non-FIFA nationality.

No.	Pos.	Nation	Player
1	GK	(England) ENG	**Karen Bardsley**
7	MF	(England) ENG	**Kelly Smith**
8	MF	(France) FRA	**Sonia Bompastor**
9	FW	(Switzerland) SUI	**Ramona Bachmann**
10	MF	(Brazil) BRA	**Marta**
12	FW	(Canada) CAN	**Christine Sinclair**
13	MF	(United States) USA	**Kristine Lilly**
18	GK	(Canada) CAN	**Erin McLeod**
22	DF	(England) ENG	Alex Scott
24	MF	(Japan) JPN	**Aya Miyama**
—	GK	(United States) USA	Nicole Barnhart*

No.	Pos.	Nation	Player
—	DF	(United States) USA	**Rachel Buehler**
—	DF	(United States) USA	**Allison Falk**
—	DF	(United States) USA	Christie Rampone
—	DF	(United States) USA	Becky Sauerbrunn
—	DF	(United States) USA	**Brittany Taylor**
—	MF	(Brazil) BRA	Cristiane
—	FW	(United States) USA	Amy Rodriguez

== Match details ==
2010-06-30
18:30 CDT

Abby's XI (United States)	2 - 5	(United States) Marta's XI
Aluko 36'; Cheney 79'	Boxscore	Marta 7' 8'; Sinclair 32'; Miyama 75'; Rodriguez 81'

KSU Soccer Stadium, Kennesaw, Georgia
Attendance: 4,610
Referee: Margaret Domka (USA)

Assistant referees:
Amy Mahan
Patrick Baker
Fourth official:
Felisha Mariscal

=== Statistics ===
	ABY	MRT
Goals scored	2	5
Total shots	15	23
Shots on target	6	8
Total Saves	3	4
Fouls	2	5
Offsides	5	5
Corner kicks	3	3
Yellow cards	0	0
Red cards	0	0
