= B. J. Snow =

American soccer coach (born 1977)

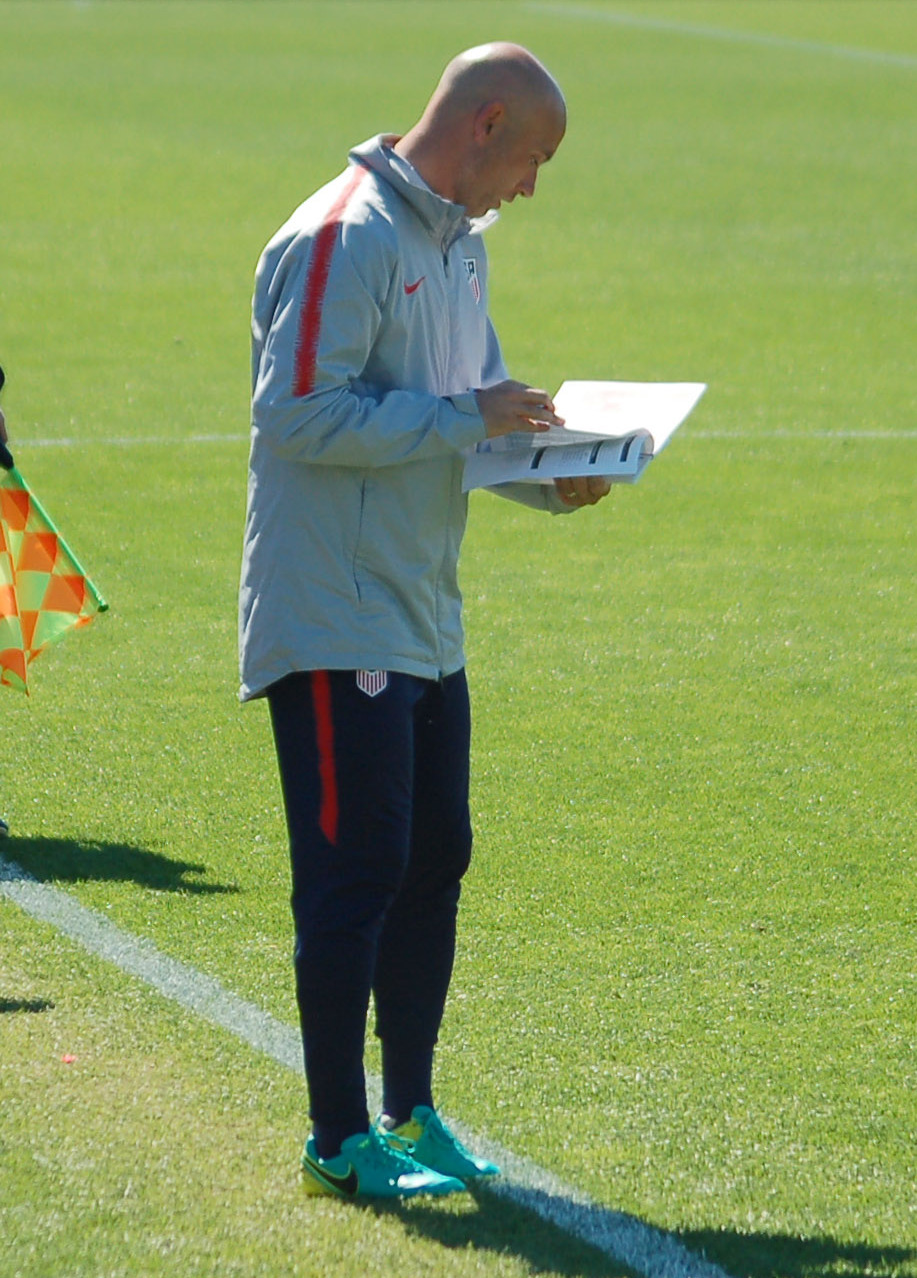
- Snow coaching the United States U-23 team in 2019

Personal information
- Full name: Brian James Snow
- Date of birth: January 30, 1977 (age 49)

College career
Years	Team	Apps	(Gls)
1996–1999	Indiana Hoosiers		

Managerial career
- 2002–2005: Portage Central HS
- 2006–2010: UCLA Bruins (assistant)
- 2011–2012: UCLA Bruins
- 2013–2017: United States U-17
- 2017–2019: United States U-23

Brian James "B. J." Snow (born January 30, 1977) is an American soccer coach who most recently served as the director of talent identification for the United States women's national soccer team and the head coach of the United States women's national under-23 soccer team. He formerly coached the United States under-17 women's national soccer team and the UCLA Bruins women's soccer team.

== Early life ==
Snow attended Portage Central High School in Portage, Michigan, and was later a coach at the school. Snow was an excellent college player; was a four-year starter in defense for Indiana from 1996 to 1999. Snow helped the Indiana Hoosiers capture four-straight Big Ten titles, and back-to-back national championships in 1998 and 1999. Indiana's record during his time in Bloomington was 81 wins, 8 losses, and 3 draws.

== Coaching career ==
=== High school ===
For four years, Snow was the head coach of the boys' soccer team at his former high school, Portage Central in Portage, Michigan. During his tenure, he led the Mustangs to three Southern Michigan Athletic Conference titles, including three district championships. Portage Central set the school record for 2 years, 19 wins in 2004, and 20 in 2005. Snow coached Eric Alexander, a NSCAA National High School Player of the Year, who later went to Indiana, and went on to play in Major League Soccer. During the same period, Snow was also an assistant coach of the girls team at Portage Central.

=== College ===
From managing teams at his former high school, Snow went to coach the UCLA Bruins women's soccer team. Snow arrived at UCLA as a volunteer assistant coach in 2006 and quickly rose through the coaching ranks, going from volunteer assistant to full-time coach in one year. He was promoted to assistant head coach in 2009. During his time at UCLA, the Bruins compiled an impressive record of 131 wins, 22 losses and 13 draws; reaching the NCAA College Cup from 2006 to 2009. UCLA also won three consecutive Pac-10 titles from 2006 to 2008.

In January 2011, the then head coach of UCLA women's soccer team, Jill Ellis, departed for the newly created national development director position of United States Soccer Federation; and Snow was promoted to head coach. In his first year as head coach Snow coached UCLA to 16 wins, 1 loss, and 4 draws, helping the Bruins reach the second round of the NCAA Tournament. UCLA also had 8 wins, 1 loss, and 2 draws in league play to finish in second-place in the highly competitive Pac-12 Conference.

In 2011, Snow recruited 10 players with national youth team experience for UCLA.

=== U.S. Soccer ===
Snow served as an assistant coach of United States women's national under-20 soccer team for Germany 2010 FIFA U-20 Women's World Cup. He also worked with U.S. Soccer as a clinician at a number of coaching seminars.

On January 25, 2013, United States Soccer Federation announced the hiring of Snow as the first full-time head coach of United States women's national under-17 soccer team.

Snow became the director of talent identification for the United States women's national soccer team in 2017. He also coached the United States women's national under-23 soccer team from 2017 to 2019.

== Personal life ==
Snow is married to former United States international and two-time Olympic gold medalist Lindsay Tarpley, a fellow alumnus of Portage Central High School. In July 2012, Snow and Tarpley welcomed their first child, a son.
