= Nick Keizer =

American football player (born 1995)

No. 82, 48
- Position: Tight end

Personal information
- Born: May 2, 1995 (age 31); Portage, Michigan, U.S.
- Listed height: 6 ft 4 in (1.93 m)
- Listed weight: 251 lb (114 kg)

Career information
- High school: Portage Northern
- College: Grand Valley State
- NFL draft: 2018: undrafted

Career history
- Baltimore Ravens (2018–2019)*; Kansas City Chiefs (2019–2021)
- * Offseason or practice squad member only

Awards and highlights
- Super Bowl champion (LIV); First-team All-GLIAC (2017)

Career NFL statistics
- Receptions: 6
- Receiving yards: 63
- Stats at Pro Football Reference

Nick Keizer (born May 2, 1995) is an American former professional football player who was a tight end in the National Football League (NFL). He played college football for the Grand Valley State Lakers.

== Early life ==
Keizer was born to a family of Latvian descent, and grew up in Portage, Michigan. He attended Portage Northern High School where he played baseball and football. As a senior, he had 19 receptions for 353 yards and three touchdowns on offense and 28 tackles, 14.5 tackles for loss and two sacks on defense and was named Division 2 All-State and selected to play in Michigan's East-West All Star Game.

== College career ==
Keizer was a member of the Grand Valley State Lakers, redshirting as a true freshman. As a redshirt senior, Keizer was named first-team All-Great Lakes Intercollegiate Athletic Conference (GLIAC) after leading tight ends in the conference with 29 receptions for 504 yards and nine touchdowns. Keizer finished his collegiate career with 45 receptions for 734 yards and 11 touchdown receptions.

== Professional career ==
=== Baltimore Ravens ===
Keizer was signed by the Baltimore Ravens as an undrafted free agent in 2018. He was cut at the end of training camp but was re-signed to the team's practice squad. He signed a futures deal after the season, but was released.

=== Kansas City Chiefs ===
Keizer was signed by the Kansas City Chiefs on May 31, 2019. He was waived during final roster cuts, but was re-signed to the practice squad and remained there for the rest of the season. He signed a futures contract with the team on February 4, 2020, and made the team coming out of training camp in 2020. Keizer made his NFL debut in the season opener on September 10, 2020, against the Houston Texans, serving as the team's second tight end and making a tackle on special teams in a 34–20 win.

Keizer re-signed to a one-year contract with the Chiefs on March 23, 2021. He announced his retirement on August 8, 2021.
