= 2008 Four Nations Tournament (women's football) =

Tournament details
- Host country: China
- City: Guangzhou
- Dates: 16–20 January 2008
- Teams: 4 (from 3 confederations)
- Venue: Guangdong Olympic Stadium

The 2008 Four Nations Tournament was the eighth edition of the Four Nations Tournament, an invitational women's football tournament held in China. The venue for this edition of the tournament was Guangdong Olympic Stadium, in the city of Guangzhou.

== Participants ==
Team	FIFA Rankings (December 2007)
United States	2
Canada	9
China (host)	13
Finland	16

== Venues ==
Guangzhou	Guangdong Olympic Stadium is located in China
Guangdong Olympic Stadium	Guangdong Olympic Stadium is located in China
23.137656°N 113.403519°E	Guangdong Olympic Stadium is located in China
Capacity: 80,012	Guangdong Olympic Stadium is located in China

== Final standings ==
Team	Pld	W	D	L	GF	GA	GD	Pts
United States	3	3	0	0	9	1	+8	9
China	3	1	1	1	2	1	+1	4
Canada	3	0	2	1	1	5	−4	2
Finland	3	0	1	2	2	7	−5	1

== Match results ==
16 January 2008

China	2–0	Finland
Jie Lie 23'; Liu Yali 43'

Guangdong Olympic Stadium, Guangzhou
16 January 2008

United States	4–0	Canada
Rodriguez 51', 65'; Tarpley 71', 78'

Guangdong Olympic Stadium, Guangzhou
Attendance: 1,000
Referee: Kirsi Savolainen (Finland)

18 January 2008

China	0–0	Canada

Guangdong Olympic Stadium, Guangzhou
18 January 2008

United States	4–1	Finland
Tarpley 37', 39'; Cheney 69'; Woznuk 80'		Sainio 54'

Guangdong Olympic Stadium, Guangzhou
Attendance: 500
Referee: Gu Ying (China)

20 January 2008

Canada	1–1	Finland
Robinson 90+3'		Nokso-Koivisto

Guangdong Olympic Stadium, Guangzhou
20 January 2008

China	0–1	United States
		Boxx 77'

Guangdong Olympic Stadium, Guangzhou
Attendance: 3,000
Referee: Carol Anne Chenard (Canada)
