= List of Los Angeles Sol players =

This list comprises all players who were placed on a regular-season roster for Los Angeles Sol during the team's first, and only, Women's Professional Soccer season in 2009.

== Statistics ==
Name	Nationality	Position	Appearances	Starts	Minutes	Goals	Assists
Camille Abily	France	MF	18	16	1449	8	1
Greer Barnes	United States	DF	0	0	0	0	0
Brittany Bock	United States	DF	20	19	1710	2	0
Liz Bogus	United States	MF	7	2	261	0	0
Shannon Boxx	United States	MF	20	19	1755	3	3
Brittany Cameron	United States	GK	0	0	0	0	0
Stephanie Cox	United States	DF	20	20	1800	0	0
Han Duan	China	FW	17	14	1256	3	2
Allison Falk	United States	DF	17	17	1435	1	0
Kendall Fletcher	United States	DF	1	1	45	0	0
Martina Franko	Canada	DF	10	10	887	0	1
Johanna Frisk	Sweden	DF	1	0	45	0	0
Valerie Henderson	United States	GK	1	1	90	0	0
Katie Larkin	United States	MF	15	5	592	0	0
Karina LeBlanc	Canada	GK	20	20	1800	0	0
Manya Makoski	United States	MF	18	16	1443	0	0
Marta	Brazil	FW	20	20	1800	10	3
Aya Miyama	Japan	MF	21	21	1890	0	6
Sharolta Nonen	Canada	DF	3	2	216	0	0
Lyndsey Patterson	United States	MF	2	0	24	0	0
Keri Sanchez	United States	DF	5	5	365	0	0
Lisa Sari	United States	MF	5	3	251	0	0
Julia Schnugg	United States	FW	0	0	0	0	0
Christie Shaner	United States	DF	1	1	52	0	0
Aly Wagner	United States	MF	16	12	999	0	4
Christie Welsh	United States	FW	3	2	132	0	0
McCall Zerboni	United States	MF	11	5	431	0	1

== Playoff statistics ==
Name	Nationality	Position	Appearances	Starts	Minutes	Goals	Assists
Brittany Bock	United States	DF	1	1	90	0	0
Shannon Boxx	United States	MF	1	1	90	0	0
Stephanie Cox	United States	DF	1	1	90	0	0
Han Duan	China	FW	1	1	78	0	0
Allison Falk	United States	DF	1	1	27	0	0
Katie Larkin	United States	MF	1	0	28	0	0
Karina LeBlanc	Canada	GK	1	1	90	0	0
Manya Makoski	United States	MF	1	1	90	0	0
Marta	Brazil	FW	1	1	90	0	0
Aya Miyama	Japan	MF	1	1	90	0	0
Sharolta Nonen	Canada	DF	1	0	55	0	0
Lyndsey Patterson	United States	MF	1	0	12	0	0
Aly Wagner	United States	MF	1	1	62	0	0
McCall Zerboni	United States	MF	1	1	35	0	0

== Key to positions ==
GK	Goalkeeper	DF	Defender	RB	Right back	SW	Sweeper
CB	Centre back	LB	Left back	MF	Midfielder	W	Winger
RW	Right winger	CM	Central midfielder	DM	Defensive midfielder	AM	Attacking midfielder
LW	Left winger	FW	Forward	SS	Second striker	CF	Centre forward
