= Tommy Henry (baseball) =

American baseball player (born 1997)

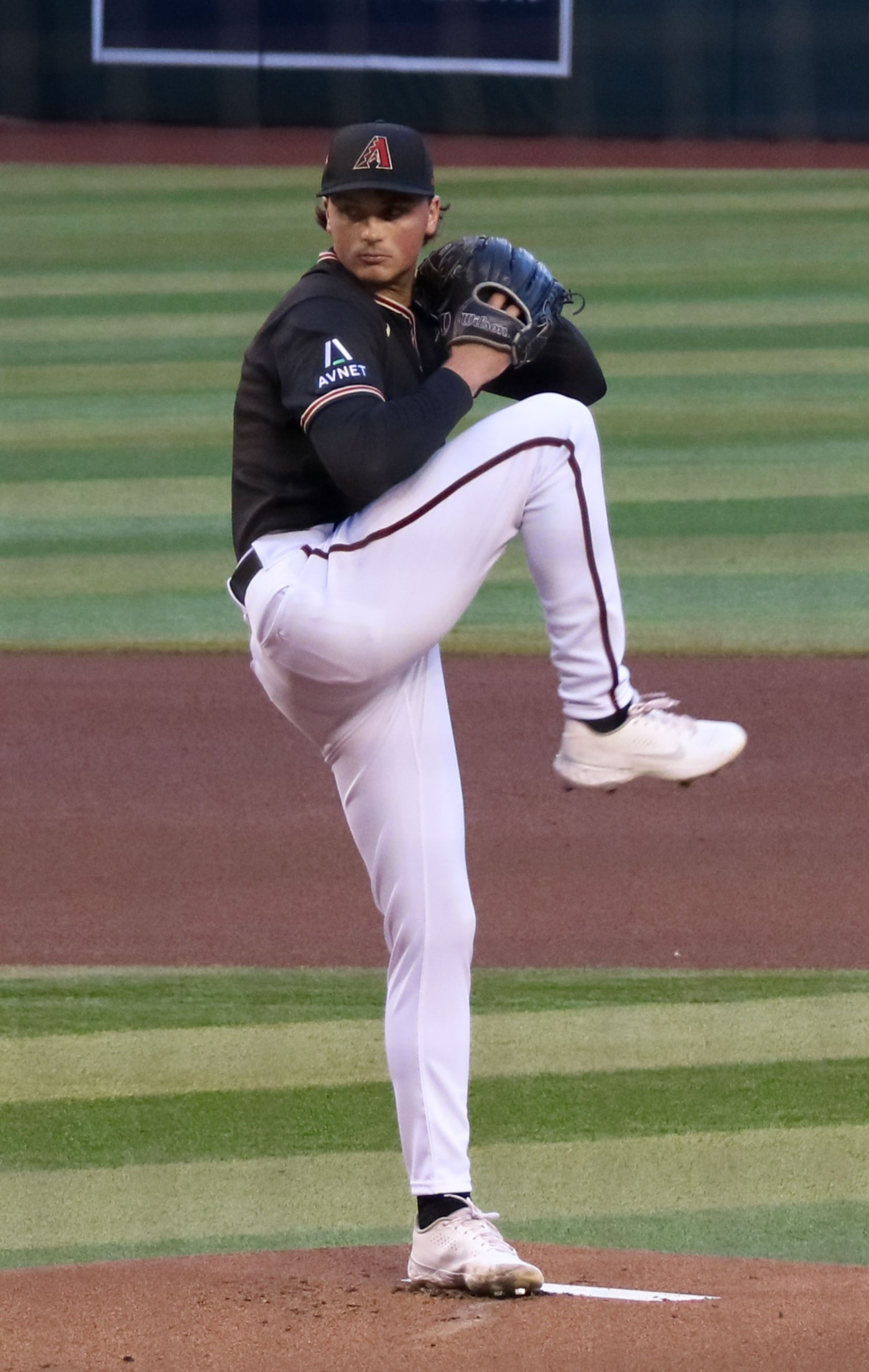
- Henry with the Arizona Diamondbacks

Free agent
- Pitcher
- Born: July 29, 1997 (age 29); Portage, Michigan, U.S.
- Bats: Left Throws: Left

MLB debut
- August 3, 2022, for the Arizona Diamondbacks

MLB statistics (through 2025 season)
- Win–loss record: 10–11
- Earned run average: 5.07
- Strikeouts: 138
- Stats at Baseball Reference

Teams
- Arizona Diamondbacks (2022–2025)

Thomas Jack Henry (born July 29, 1997) is an American professional baseball pitcher who is a free agent. He made his Major League Baseball (MLB) debut in 2022. He played college baseball for the Michigan Wolverines.

== Early life ==
Henry attended Portage Northern High School in Portage, Michigan, where he was the 2016 Mr. Baseball and Gatorade Player of the Year.

== College career ==
In 2017 and 2018, he played collegiate summer baseball for the Yarmouth-Dennis Red Sox of the Cape Cod Baseball League.

As a junior, Henry led the 2019 Michigan Wolverines baseball team to the 2019 College World Series. Despite having been hospitalized with the flu, he was the winning pitcher against No. 1 UCLA in the deciding game of the NCAA Super Regional on June 9.

On June 17, he pitched a three-hit, complete-game shutout with 10 strikeouts against Florida State in the College World Series. Michigan coach Erik Bakich said of Henry's performance: "He was the entire storyline. We needed a strong performance, and he gave us something magical."

On June 24, in the first game of the College World Series finals against Vanderbilt, Henry was the winning pitcher and tallied eight strikeouts.

Overall, Henry compiled a 3–0 record, struck out 31 batters, and allowed eight earned runs in 31 2/3 innings during the 2019 NCAA Tournament.

== Professional career ==
Henry was selected by the Arizona Diamondbacks with the 74th overall pick in the 2019 Major League Baseball draft. Henry made three appearances in 2019 for the Hillsboro Hops after signing, going 0–0 with a 6.00 ERA over 3 innings. Henry did not play in a game in 2020 due to the cancellation of the minor league season because of the COVID-19 pandemic.

Henry returned to action in 2021 with the Double-A Amarillo Sod Poodles, posting a 4-6 record and 5.21 ERA with 135 strikeouts across 23 starts. He began the 2022 season with the Triple-A Reno Aces.

On August 3, 2022, Henry was selected to the 40-man roster and promoted to the major leagues for the first time. On August 9, Henry earned his first career win after pitching seven innings of one-run ball against the Pittsburgh Pirates. In nine appearances for the Diamondbacks, he posted a 3-4 record and 5.36 ERA with 36 strikeouts over 47 innings of work.

Henry was optioned to the Triple-A Reno Aces to begin the 2023 season. On April 24, 2023, he was recalled to the Diamondbacks. After 17 appearances (16 starts), in which he went 5–4 with a 4.15 ERA and 64 strikeouts, Henry was placed on the injured list with left elbow inflammation on July 30, 2023. On August 19, he was transferred to the 60-day injured list.

Henry made 9 appearances (7 starts) for the Diamondbacks during the 2024 campaign, compiling a 2-3 record and 7.04 ERA with 30 strikeouts across 38 1/3 innings pitched.

Henry was optioned to Triple-A Reno to begin the 2025 season. In two appearances for the Diamondbacks, he recorded a 4.05 ERA with eight strikeouts across 6 2/3 innings pitched. On June 20, 2025, it was announced that Henry would require Tommy John surgery, ruling him out for the remainder of the season. He was designated for assignment by the Diamondbacks on November 18. On November 21, Henry was non-tendered by Arizona and became a free agent.

On December 1, 2025, Henry re-signed with the Diamondbacks on a minor league contract. In 2026, he appeared in 23 games (20 starts) across three levels of the minors going 6-10 with a 7.18 ERA and 73 strikeouts. He elected free agency on November 2.

== Personal life ==
Henry and his wife, Brianna, were married in December 2024 in West Bloomfield, Michigan.
