= Pete Metzelaars =

American football player and coach (born 1960)

No. 88, 89
- Position: Tight end

Personal information
- Born: May 24, 1960 (age 66); Three Rivers, Michigan, U.S.
- Listed height: 6 ft 7 in (2.01 m)
- Listed weight: 254 lb (115 kg)

Career information
- High school: Central (Portage, Michigan)
- College: Wabash (1978–1981)
- NFL draft: 1982: 3rd round, 75th overall pick

Career history

Playing
- Seattle Seahawks (1982–1984); Buffalo Bills (1985–1994); Carolina Panthers (1995); Detroit Lions (1996–1997)

Coaching
- Charlotte Christian (1998–2002) Offensive coordinator; Barcelona Dragons (2003) Assistant coach; Wingate (2003) Offensive assistant; Indianapolis Colts (2004–2011) Offensive line coach; Buffalo Bills (2012) Tight ends coach; San Diego Chargers (2014–2015) Tight ends coach; Charlotte Christian (2016–2017) Offensive line coach; Atlanta Legends (2019) Offensive line coach; Helvetic Guards (2023) Special teams coordinator & tight ends coach

Awards and highlights
- As a player: PFWA All-Rookie Team (1982); Buffalo Bills 50th Anniversary Team; As a coach: Super Bowl champion (XLI)

Career NFL statistics
- Receptions: 383
- Receiving yards: 3,686
- Receiving touchdowns: 29
- Stats at Pro Football Reference

Peter Henry Metzelaars (born May 24, 1960) is an American former professional football player who was a tight end for 16 seasons in the National Football League (NFL) with the Seattle Seahawks, Buffalo Bills, Carolina Panthers, and Detroit Lions. He played college football for the Wabash Little Giants and was selected by the Seahawks in the third round of the 1982 NFL draft.

== Early life and college ==
Metzelaars played high school football at Portage Central High School in Portage, Michigan, and played college football at Wabash College, graduating from Wabash in 1982. While at Wabash, he played for an undefeated football team, while also leading the basketball team to the NCAA Division III national championship as a senior and being named the tournament's Most Outstanding Player. During his senior year, he earned Academic All-American honors In football, he was coached by Stan Parrish and in basketball coached by legendary basketball coach Mac Petty.

== Professional career ==
Metzelaars was taken in the third round with the 75th overall pick by Seattle in the 1982 NFL draft. He played for three seasons in Seattle before being traded to the Bills in 1985. When Jim Kelly joined the Bills in 1986, Metzelaars became a productive part of the offense. He played with the Bills in their 4 Super Bowl losses from 1990 to 1993, and scored a touchdown in Super Bowl XXVI. Metzelaars' best season was in 1993, when he caught 68 passes for 609 yards and 4 touchdowns.

Metzelaars was not re-signed by the Bills after the 1994 season. He then signed a three-year, $2.4 million deal with the Carolina Panthers. He caught the first touchdown pass in Carolina franchise history, but only played one season for them. He finished his career by playing two seasons for the Detroit Lions, starting in 17 of the 31 games he appeared in while splitting time with David Sloan. The Lions offensive coordinator in 1996 was Tom Moore. Metzelaars would go on to work alongside Moore later in their careers.

Metzelaars finished his 16 NFL seasons with 383 receptions for 3,686 yards and 29 touchdowns in 235 games. At the time of his retirement, his 235 games were the most ever played by a tight end in NFL history.

== NFL career statistics ==
Legend
**Bold**	Career high

=== Regular season ===
Year	Team	Games		Receiving				
Year	Team	GP	GS	Rec	Yds	Avg	Lng	TD
1982	SEA	9	2	15	152	10.1	26	0
1983	SEA	**16**	7	7	72	10.3	17	1
1984	SEA	9	4	5	80	**16.0**	25	0
1985	BUF	**16**	8	12	80	6.7	13	1
1986	BUF	**16**	**16**	49	485	9.9	44	3
1987	BUF	12	12	28	290	10.4	34	0
1988	BUF	**16**	**16**	33	438	13.3	35	1
1989	BUF	**16**	**16**	18	179	9.9	23	2
1990	BUF	**16**	5	10	60	6.0	12	1
1991	BUF	**16**	1	5	54	10.8	51	2
1992	BUF	**16**	7	30	298	9.9	**53**	**6**
1993	BUF	**16**	**16**	**68**	**609**	9.0	51	4
1994	BUF	**16**	**16**	49	428	8.7	35	5
1995	CAR	14	14	20	171	8.6	27	3
1996	DET	15	11	17	146	8.6	20	0
1997	DET	**16**	6	17	144	8.5	22	0
		235	157	383	3,686	9.6	53	29

=== Playoffs ===
Year	Team	Games		Receiving				
Year	Team	GP	GS	Rec	Yds	Avg	Lng	TD
1983	SEA	3	3	1	5	5.0	5	**1**
1984	SEA	2	0	0	0	0.0	0	0
1988	BUF	2	2	2	21	**10.5**	14	0
1989	BUF	1	1	0	0	0.0	0	0
1990	BUF	3	0	0	0	0.0	0	0
1991	BUF	3	1	2	16	8.0	14	**1**
1992	BUF	**4**	**4**	8	72	9.0	**24**	0
1993	BUF	3	3	**10**	**80**	8.0	17	0
1997	DET	1	0	0	0	0.0	0	0
		22	14	23	194	8.4	24	2

== Coaching career ==
After retiring, Metzelaars moved into the coaching ranks as the offensive coordinator at Charlotte Christian School from 1998 to 2002. In 2003, Metzelaars joined Wingate University as an assistant offensive coach but also coached in NFL Europe with Barcelona during the off-season. He also was an intern with the Indianapolis Colts during their 2003 training camp, assisting with the tight ends under offensive coordinator Tom Moore. In 2004, Metzelaars joined the Colts staff full-time as the offensive quality control coach. After reaching four Super Bowls with the Buffalo Bills as a player, he finally won a ring with the Colts' triumph in Super Bowl XLI. In 2012, Metzelaars joined the Buffalo Bills staff full-time as the tight ends coach. He, along with the entire Bills coaching staff, was dismissed on December 31, 2012. On January 24, 2014, Metzelaars became tight ends coach for the San Diego Chargers, replacing Jason Michael who left to be offensive coordinator for the Tennessee Titans. He was reunited with former Buffalo Bills teammate Frank Reich, who was promoted to be the Chargers' new offensive coordinator.

In 2018, Metzelaars became the offensive line coach for the Atlanta Legends of the newly formed Alliance of American Football.

In 2023 he joined the Helvetic Guards of the European League of Football (ELF) as the special teams coordinator and tight ends coach. However, On 4 April 2024, the team announced the end of operations.

Metzelaars currently works as a Football Evaluation Specialist for SūmerSports, and is a featured scout in SūmerSports’ NFL draft evaluation show, THE EVALUATION.

== Personal life ==
Metzelaars and his wife, Barbara, have two sons: Anthony and Jonathan.

In 2011, Metzelaars was inducted into the Academic All-American Hall of Fame.
