= Lauren Holiday =

American soccer player (born 1987)

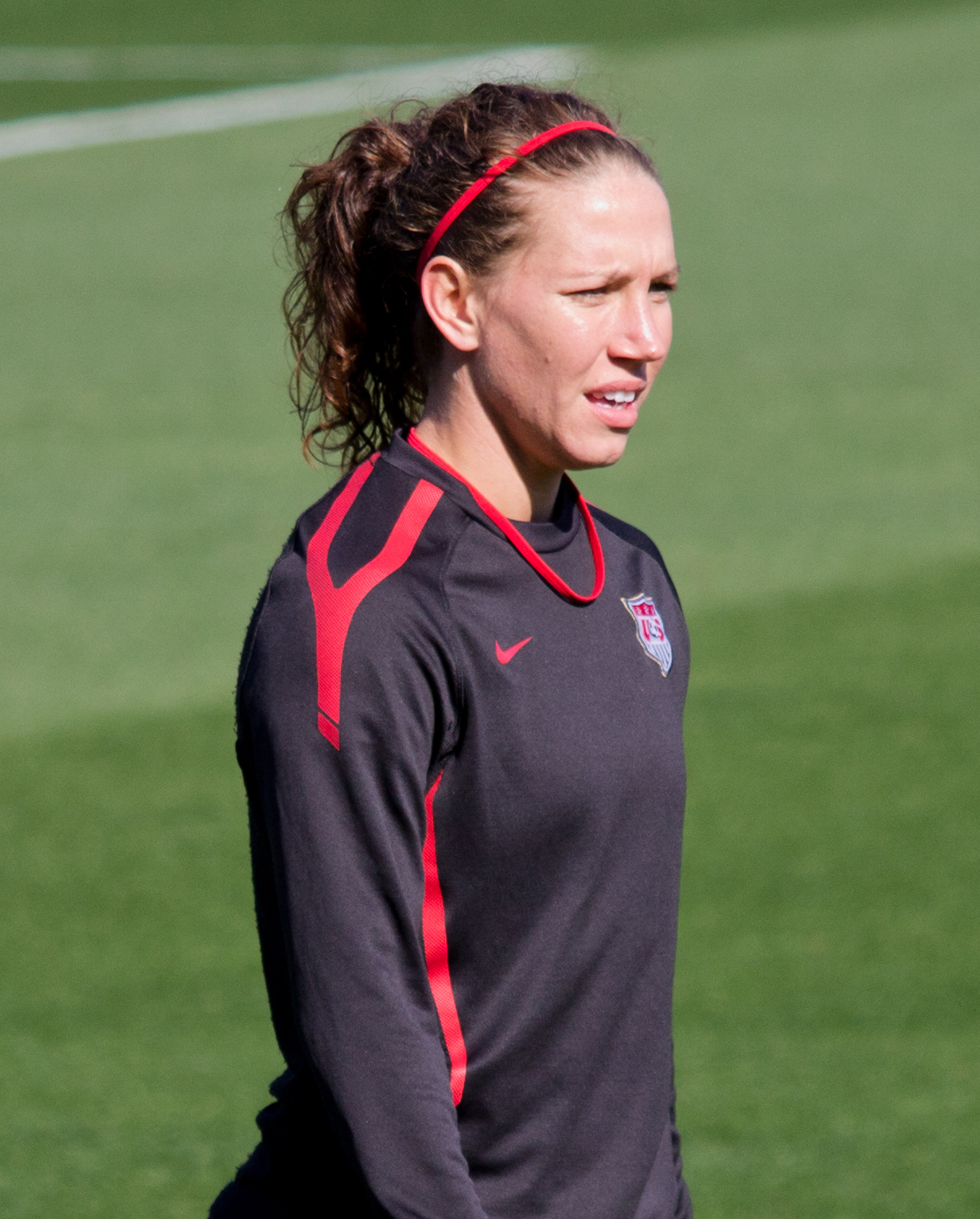
- Holiday in 2012

Personal information
- Full name: Lauren Cheney Holiday
- Birth name: Lauren Nicole Cheney
- Date of birth: September 30, 1987 (age 39)
- Place of birth: Indianapolis, Indiana, United States
- Height: 5 ft 8 in (1.73 m)
- Positions: Forward; midfielder

Youth career
- Ben Davis High School

College career
Years	Team	Apps	(Gls)
2006–2009	UCLA Bruins		(71)

Senior career*
Years	Team	Apps	(Gls)
2009	Pali Blues	10	(2)
2010–2011	Boston Breakers	32	(8)
2013–2015	FC Kansas City	48	(22)

International career^{‡}
2004	United States U17		
2006–2007	United States U20	20	(15)
2005	United States U21		
2007–2015	United States	133	(24)
Medal record
Women's soccer
Representing the United States
Olympic Games
Gold medal – first place	2008 Beijing	Team
Gold medal – first place	2012 London	Team
FIFA Women's World Cup
Silver medal – second place	2011 Germany	Team
Gold medal – first place	2015 Canada	Team
Pan American Games
Silver medal – second place	2007 Rio de Janeiro	Team
- * Club domestic league appearances and goals as of October 5, 2015 ‡ National team caps and goals as of October 25, 2015

Lauren Cheney Holiday (born Lauren Nicole Cheney; September 30, 1987) is an American former professional soccer player who played as a midfielder and forward for the United States women's national soccer team from 2007 to 2015. She is a two-time Olympic gold medalist and FIFA Women's World Cup champion. Holiday played professionally for FC Kansas City in the National Women's Soccer League (NWSL) and the Boston Breakers in the Women's Professional Soccer (WPS). She played collegiate soccer for the UCLA Bruins.

Holiday won gold with the national team at the 2008 Beijing Summer Olympics, 2012 London Summer Olympics, and the 2015 FIFA Women's World Cup in Canada. She played for the team at the 2011 FIFA Women's World Cup where the U.S. were the runners-up and Holiday was named to the tournament's All-Star team.

In 2007, she was named U.S. Soccer Young Female Athlete of the Year. She earned U.S. Soccer Female Athlete of the Year honors in 2014. She was the first player in NWSL history to have her jersey retired after retiring from the league.

== Early life ==
Born in Indianapolis, Indiana to Rita and George Cheney, Holiday began playing soccer as a youth after watching her brother play the sport. She played on boys' teams until age 12. She attended Ben Davis High School in Indianapolis where she was named the school's most valuable offensive player in 2004–05. In 2004, she was named Metro Player of the Year by the Indianapolis Star. In 2006, she was named Parade All-American and was Gatorade Player of the Year in addition to receiving numerous regional awards including first-team All-Conference, All-County and All-State, and Indianapolis Star Super Team Player of the Year. She earned Indiana All-State selection honors each year of her high school career and was named NSCAA All-American three times. Holiday finished her high school career having scored 118 goals and served 67 assists. She graduated mid-year in 2006 to train full-time with the United States U-20 women's national soccer team for the FIFA U-20 Women's World Cup.

=== UCLA Bruins, 2006–2009 ===
In the fall of 2006, Holiday enrolled at UCLA, where she was named a first-team All-American and NSCAA Freshman of the Year. She led the Pac-10 Conference with 19 goals, which also set a new UCLA freshman record with a goals-per-game percentage of .95. As a sophomore in 2007, she was the runner-up for the women's Hermann Trophy and the Pac-10 Player of the Year. She led the conference again in goals scored with 23 and broke the UCLA single-season school records for points (57) and goals (23).

Holiday became the first player in UCLA history to earn NSCAA/adidas First-Team All-America honors all four years of her career. At UCLA, she set new school records for points (173) and game-winning goals (28); and tied the career school record in goals with 71. She had 31 career assists, second place in the record book. During her four years, the Bruins played in consecutive NCAA College Cups.

== Playing career ==
=== Club ===
==== Pali Blues, 2009 ====
During the summer of 2009, Holiday joined Southern California team Pali Blues, in the W-League. Throughout the entire regular season, the Blues did not lose a match and finished first in the Western Conference with a 9–0–3 record. After defeating the Hudson Valley Quickstrike Lady Blues 4–0 in the championship semi-final in which Holiday scored a goal in the 65th minute, the Pali Blues clinched the championship title in a 2–1 defeat of the Washington Freedom Reserves on August 7, 2009.

==== Boston Breakers, 2010–2011 ====
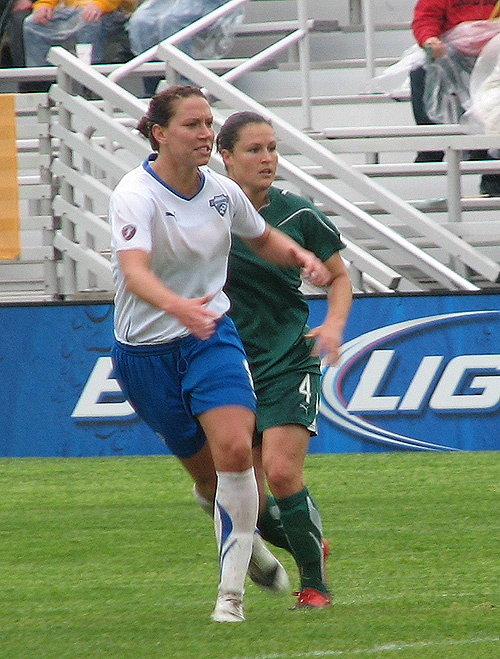
Holiday playing in the rain against Saint Louis Athletica.

On January 15, 2010, Holiday was selected by the Boston Breakers as the second overall pick in the WPS Draft. She played in 23 games for Boston during the 2010 season, starting in 21 matches and scoring five goals with two assists. After Boston finished in second place during the regular season with a 10–8–6, the team advanced to the playoffs. Holiday scored the team's lone goal in the 2–1 playoff loss against the Philadelphia Independence. Holiday was named as a starter in the 2010 WPS All-Star Game and scored in the 79th minute.

During the 2011 WPS season, Holiday made ten appearances for the club. After returning to Boston following the 2011 FIFA Women's World Cup, Holiday's brace during the team's final regular season match helped the Breakers clinch the last remaining spot in the playoffs. She was subsequently named WPS Player of the Week for week 18 of the season. The Breakers finished the regular season in fourth place with a 5–9–4 The team was defeated 3–1 by magicJack during the playoff semifinal.

==== FC Kansas City, 2013–2015 ====
In 2013, Holiday was one of three national team players along with Becky Sauerbrunn and Nicole Barnhart to be allocated to FC Kansas City for the inaugural season of the National Women's Soccer League as part of the NWSL Player Allocation. In June 2013, she was named NWSL Player of the Month after scoring six times in five games and becoming the league's leading scorer with eight goals. FC Kansas City finished second during the regular season with an 11–6–5 record. The team advanced to the playoffs but were defeated 2–3 by Portland Thorns FC during the semi-finals. Following the 2013 NWSL season, Holiday was awarded the Golden Boot, an award given to the player who scores the most goals (12) and was named the league's Most Valuable Player (MVP).

In 2014 NWSL season, FC Kansas City finished the regular season in second place, with Holiday providing a team-leading 7 assists, and finished second in goals scored with 8 behind Amy Rodriguez's 13. In the post-season playoffs, Holiday scored the second goal in a 2–0 victory over the Portland Thorns FC in the semi-final, and provided both the assists for Rodriguez's two goals, as they beat Seattle Reign FC 2–1 in the 2014 Championship game, to clinch the club's first NWSL title. Holiday was voted the match's MVP.

As of 2015, Holiday was the leading goal scorer (20) and assist leader (12) all-time in the NWSL. She retired from the NWSL at the end of the 2015 season as Kansas City repeated as champions, allowing Holiday to retire holding world and league titles. Her number 12 jersey was retired in her honour.

=== International ===
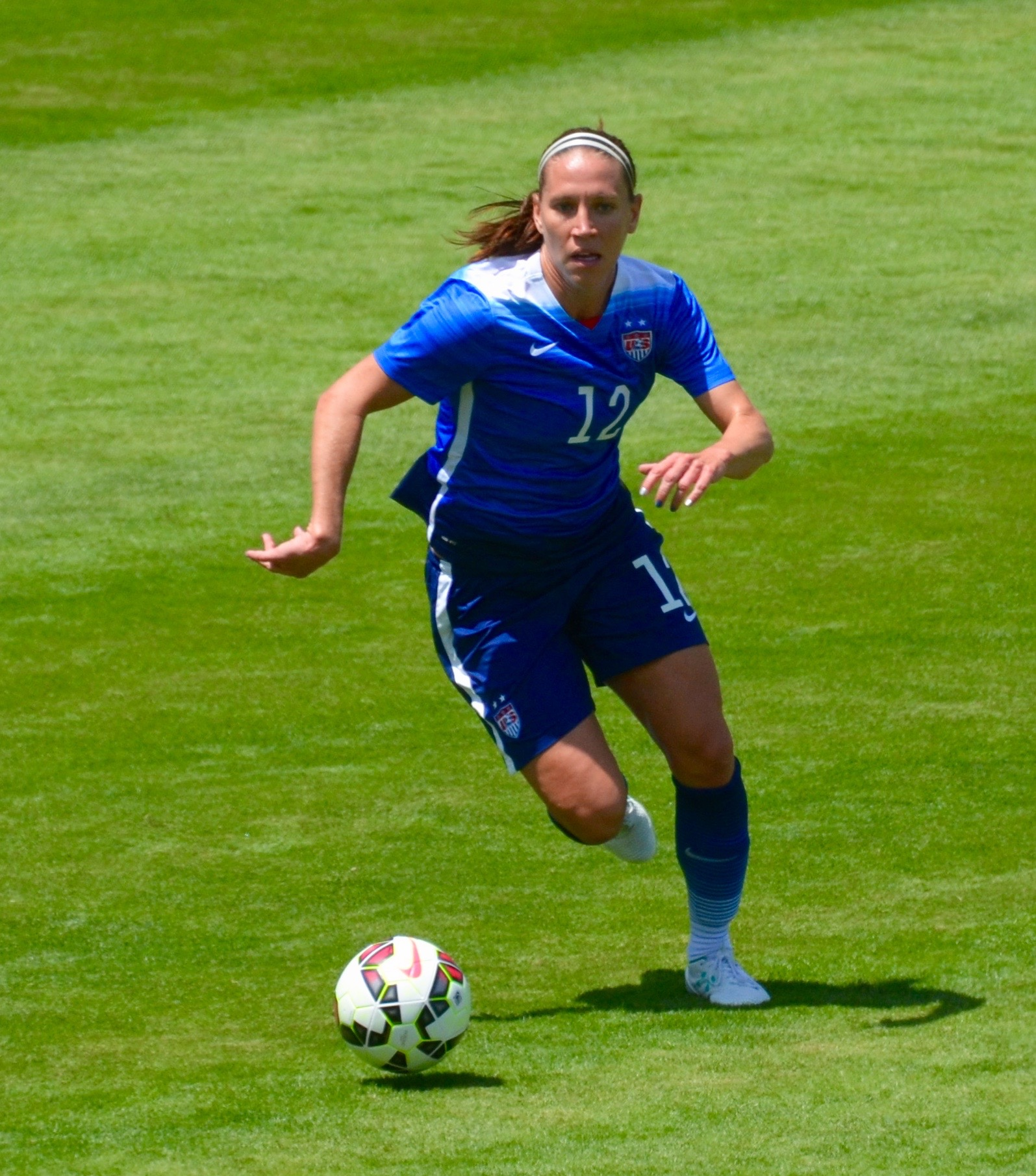
Holiday playing with the United States women's national soccer team in San Jose, California, 2015

Holiday made her first appearance and start for the U.S. women's national soccer team on January 26, 2007, against Germany. She earned her second cap and scored her first goals against Mexico on April 14, 2007. The same year, she was named the U.S. Soccer Young Female Athlete of the Year.

==== 2008 Beijing Olympics ====
Holiday was named to the U.S. roster for the 2008 Summer Olympics in Beijing after Abby Wambach was forced to withdraw with a broken leg. She appeared in three games as a substitute helping the U.S. win gold at the tournament. In 2010, Holiday was the second-leading scorer on the team with seven goals in 13 total matches, starting seven.

==== 2011 FIFA Women's World Cup ====
2011 saw the U.S. team making preparations for the 2011 FIFA Women's World Cup and training starting with the Four Nations Tournament in January. Holiday scored her 12th international goal during the U.S.'s 2–1 win over Canada. The U.S. defeated China 2–0 in the final to clinch the tournament title. At the 2011 Algarve Cup in March, she scored a goal against Iceland during the final helping the U.S. win 4–2 and clinch their 8th title at the tournament.

Holiday started in all six 2011 FIFA Women's World Cup matches, scoring two goals and leading the team with three assists. Her performance earned a spot on the Women's World Cup All-Star Team. Holiday scored the first tournament goal for the U.S. during the team's first group stage against North Korea on June 28 helping the U.S. win 2–0. During the team's next group stage match against Colombia, Cheney served the assist to Megan Rapinoe's first World Cup goal who had just subbed into the match. It was the quickest goal for a U.S. substitute in history of the tournament. Despite losing to Sweden 2–1 during the team's third group stage match, the U.S. advanced to the knockout stage where they faced Brazil on July 10. The U.S. won the dramatic match after equalizing the match in the 120th minute and winning 5–3 in the resulting penalty kick shootout. During the semi-final match against France on July 13, Holiday scored the game-opening goal in the ninth minute. In the 79th minute, her cross to Abby Wambach lifted the score to 2–1 and an eventual 3–1 win to advance to the World Cup final against Japan. In front of a sell-out crowd of 48,817, the United States tied Japan 1–1 during regulation time and 2–2 in overtime advancing to a penalty kick shootout where they were defeated. Despite spraining an ankle early in the first half of the match, Holiday continued playing until being subbed off at the start of the second half.

==== 2012 London Olympics ====
Holiday led the United States team with seven assists in five games at the 2012 CONCACAF Women's Olympic Qualifying Tournament in Vancouver, British Columbia including four assists during the U.S.'s 14–0 rout of the Dominican Republic. She played in all six games at the 2012 Summer Olympics, starting five. She came off the bench in the gold medal match to play the final 23 minutes after suffering a minor injury in the semifinal.

==== 2015 FIFA Women's World Cup ====
In 2015, Holiday scored the third goal of the 2015 FIFA Women's World Cup Final in the 14th minute of the game helping the U.S. defeat previous World Cup champions Japan 5–2.

On July 7, 2015, following the 2015 FIFA Women's World Cup, Holiday announced her retirement from her international career.

=== Career statistics ===
==== International goals ====
Key (expand for notes on "international goals" and sorting)
Location	Geographic location of the venue where the competition occurred Sorted by country name first, then by city name
Lineup	Start – played entire match on minute (off player) – substituted on at the minute indicated, and player was substituted off at the same time off minute (on player) – substituted off at the minute indicated, and player was substituted on at the same time (c) – captain Sorted by minutes played
Goal in match	Goal of total goals by the player in the match Sorted by total goals followed by goal number
#	NumberOfGoals.goalNumber scored by the player in the match (alternate notation to Goal in match)
Min	The minute in the match the goal was scored. For list that include caps, blank indicates played in the match but did not score a goal.
Assist/pass	The ball was passed by the player, which assisted in scoring the goal. This column depends on the availability and source of this information.
penalty or pk	Goal scored on penalty-kick which was awarded due to foul by opponent. (Goals scored in penalty-shoot-out, at the end of a tied match after extra-time, are not included.)
Score	The match score after the goal was scored. Sorted by goal difference, then by goal scored by the player's team
Result	The final score. Sorted by goal difference in the match, then by goal difference in penalty-shoot-out if it is taken, followed by goal scored by the player's team in the match, then by goal scored in the penalty-shoot-out. For matches with identical final scores, match ending in extra-time without penalty-shoot-out is a tougher match, therefore precede matches that ended in regulation
aet	The score at the end of extra-time; the match was tied at the end of 90' regulation
pso	Penalty-shoot-out score shown in parentheses; the match was tied at the end of extra-time
	Green background color – exhibition or closed door international friendly match
	Yellow background color – match at an invitational tournament
	Red background color – Olympic women's football qualification match
	Light-blue background color – FIFA women's world cup qualification match
	Orange background color – Continental Games or regional tournament
	Pink background color – Olympic women's football tournament
	Blue background color – FIFA women's world cup final tournament
NOTE on background colors: Continental Games or regional tournament are sometimes also qualifier for World Cup or Olympics; information depends on the source such as the player's federation. NOTE: some keys may not apply for a particular football player

	Date	Location	Opponent	Lineup	No.	Min	Assist/pass	Score	Result	Competition
1	2007-04-14	Foxborough	Mexico	on 8' (off Lilly)	1.1	88	Heather O'Reilly	5–0	5–0	Friendly
2	2008-01-18	Guangzhou	Finland	on 46' (off Wambach)	1.1	69	Tina DiMartino	3–1	4–1	Four Nations Tournament
3	2008-04-04	Juarez	Jamaica	Start	1.1	21	unassisted	2–0	6–0	Olympic qualifier: final round
4	2009-05-25	Toronto	Canada	on 77' (off Rodriguez)	1.1	80	Heather O'Reilly	4–0	4–0	Friendly
5	2010-02-24	Santo Antonio	Iceland	off 66' (on Rodriguez)	1.1	61	Lori Lindsey	2–0	2–0	Algarve Cup: Group B
6	2010-03-01	Ferreiras	Sweden	on 46' (off Rodriguez)	2.1	56	Casey Nogueira	1–0	2–0	Algarve Cup: Group B
7	2010-03-01	Ferreiras	Sweden	on 46' (off Rodriguez)	2.2	86	Lori Lindsey	2–0	2–0	Algarve Cup: Group B
8	2010-03-03	Faro	Germany	off 84' (on Nogueira)	1.1	69	unassisted	3–1	3–2	Algarve Cup: final
9	2010-03-28	San Diego	Mexico	on 46' (off Rodriguez)	1.1	72	Shannon Boxx	3–0	3–0	Friendly
10	2010-11-01	Cancun	Costa Rica	Start	1.1	68	unassisted	2–0	4–0	World Cup qualifier: Group B
11	2010-11-08	Cancun	Costa Rica	Start	1.1	17	Lori Lindsey	1–0	3–0	World Cup qualifier: third-place match
12	2011-01-23	Chongqing	Canada	on 46' (off Rodriguez)	1.1	54	Lindsay Tarpley	1–0	2–1	Four Nations Tournament
13	2011-03-09	Faro	Iceland	off 46' (on Wambach)	1.1	45+1	Megan Rapinoe	2–2	4–2	Algarve Cup: final
14	2011-06-05	Harrison	Mexico	on 61' (off Rodriguez)	1.1	90+2	Abby Wambach	1–0	1–0	Friendly
15	2011-06-28	Dresden	Korea DPR	Start	1.1	54	Abby Wambach	1–0	2–0	World Cup: Group C
16	2011-07-13	Mönchengladbach	France	Start	1.1	9	Heather O'Reilly	1–0	3–1	World Cup: semifinal
17	2012-01-20	Vancouver	Dominican	Start	1.1	64	Heather O'Reilly	11–0	14–0	Olympic qualifier: Group B
18	2012-01-22	Vancouver	Guatemala	off 46' (on Morgan)	1.1	24	unassisted	3–0	13–0	Olympic qualifier: Group B
19	2013-06-15	Foxborough	Korea Republic	off 77' (on Brian)	1.1	7	Tobin Heath	2–0	4–1	Friendly
20	2013-06-20	Harrison	Korea Republic	off 71' (on Averbuch)	1.1	64	Kelley O'Hara	5–0	5–0	Friendly
21	2013-10-20	San Antonio	Australia	on 64' (off Brian)	1.1	6	unassisted	1–0	4–0	Friendly
22	2014-02-13	Atlanta	Russia	on 68' (off Brian)	1.1	81	penalty	6–0	8–0	Friendly
23	2014-04-06	Commerce	China	off 67' (on Rapinoe)	1.1	39	unassisted	1–0	2–0	Friendly
24	2015-07-05	Vancouver	Japan	Start	1.1	14	unassisted	3–0	5–2	World Cup: final

== Honors and awards ==
=== International ===
- Olympic Gold Medal: 2008, 2012
- FIFA Women's World Cup: 2015
- Algarve Cup: 2008, 2010, 2011, 2013, 2015
- CONCACAF Women's Olympic Qualifying Tournament: 2008, 2012
- CONCACAF Women's Championship: 2014
- Four Nations Tournament: 2007, 2008, 2011

=== Individual ===
- Muhammad Ali Sports Humanitarian Award (2023)
- FIFA Women's World Cup All-Star Team: 2011
- WPS All-Star: 2010
- NWSL Best XI: 2013, 2014
- NWSL Most Valuable Player: 2013
- NWSL Golden Boot: 2013
- NWSL Championship Most Valuable Player: 2014
- U.S. Soccer Young Female Athlete of the Year: 2007
- NCAA All-American First-Team: 2006, 2007, 2008, 2009
- Pac-10 Conference Player of the Year: 2007
- Soccer America Player of the Year Award: 2007
- U.S. Soccer Female Athlete of the Year: 2014
- Sagamore of the Wabash: 2015
- National Soccer Hall of Fame: 2023

=== Team ===
with FC Kansas City

- NWSL championship: 2014, 2015

== Personal life ==
At the age of three, Holiday had open heart surgery to correct a heart defect. She married professional basketball player Jrue Holiday, fellow former UCLA Bruin and NBA point guard, on July 7, 2013. The two first met and began dating in 2008 while they were both attending UCLA. Jrue currently plays for the Portland Trail Blazers.

Holiday is a Christian.

On September 4, 2016, it was announced that Holiday had previously been diagnosed with a brain tumor during her pregnancy. Her husband chose to take a leave of absence to care for her. The tumor, which was benign, was found on the right side of her brain in late June 2016. Holiday gave birth to a daughter, Jrue Tyler Holiday, in September 2016, and the tumor was successfully removed in October. She gave birth to a son, Hendrix, in 2020.

Holiday has signed endorsement deals with Under Armour and Chobani.

In 2020, Holiday joined the ownership group for Angel City FC of the NWSL.

In April 2025, it was announced that Holiday, after divesting from Angel City, had invested in the North Carolina Courage through the Holiday Family Trust. Holiday will serve as an ambassador and advisor for the club.

== In popular culture ==
=== Video games ===
Holiday was featured along with her national teammates in the EA Sports' FIFA video game series in FIFA 16, the first time women players were included in the game.

=== Ticker tape parade and White House honor ===
Following the United States' win at the 2015 FIFA Women's World Cup, Holiday and her teammates became the first women's sports team to be honored with a ticker tape parade in New York City. Each player received a key to the city from Mayor Bill de Blasio. In October of the same year, the team was honored by President Barack Obama at the White House.

== See also ==
- List of American and Canadian soccer champions
- List of Olympic medalists in football
- List of footballers with 100 or more caps
- List of UCLA alumni
