= Betty Lee Ongley =

First woman mayor in Michigan

Betty Lee Clara Ongley (née Sweeney, born January 25, 1926) is an American activist, community leader, educator and mentor who became the first female mayor in the State of Michigan when she was elected in 1973 in Portage, Michigan, a southwestern Michigan city in Kalamazoo County. The Betty Lee Ongley Nature Preserve has been named for Ongley in recognition of her outstanding leadership, mentorships, and service to the city, state and country. In 2023, Ongley was named as the recipient of the Michigan Women Forward's Women of Courage and Achievement Award. The organization describes it as follows: This prestigious award celebrates Michigan women who exemplify commitment to community services, have a proven track record as a mentor and role model for others, and who empower and inspire their community.

== Education ==
Originally from Algonac, Michigan, Ongley attended Algonac High School, where she was the first female sousaphone player in the school band and the first woman in the town's marching band, and graduated in 1943. Ongley attended Western Michigan University where she earned a Bachelor of Science in Biology and Social Science in 1947 and a Master's degree in Social Science in 1958. She also received a designation as an Education Specialist, Counseling and Personnel Study in 1974, a Graduate Certificate in Holistic Health in 1984, and a Graduate Certificate in Gerontology in 1991.

== Career ==
She received Distinguished Service Awards from both the Michigan Association of College Educators and Supervisors (1981) and the Michigan School Counselors Association (1983). The Michigan Association of Women Deans, Administrators and Counselors recognized Ongley in 1990, granting her their Award for Outstanding Contributions to Women and Education. In 1997, the Kalamazoo Area Retired School Personnel issued her their very first "Recognition for Outstanding Contributions to the Community" award. She also received a Distinguished Alumni Award from Western Michigan University's Department of Counselor Education (1987) and the first Holistic Healthcare Outstanding Alumni Award (2002), and the WMU College of Education "Apple" Award in 2011. Ongley had retired from her professional life in school guidance and counseling career in 1986 but continued an active and robust involvement in the community, leading to the numerous awards from educational institutions.

== Elected office ==
In addition to her service on the Portage City Council (1968-1984 and 2001-2005) and as Mayor (1973-1979), local citizens also elected Ongley to the Kalamazoo County Board of Commissioners for two terms 1987-1990. She was also elected a Trustee of the Portage District Library (previously Portage Public Library) in 2007 and again in 2012, where she served two terms as Chair of its Board of Trustees. She was a leader in the original millage campaign to build the library building, as well as reorganizing it as a District Library. In January 2026 Betty received special recognition from the Portage City Council on her 100th birthday, noting her achievements in the City of Portage, Kalamazoo County, and State of Michigan with both career and community service accomplishments.

== Community engagement ==
The American Red Cross honored her more than seventy years of volunteer service with the organization in a January 2021 event. Ongley has been an active Red Cross volunteer since 1950, serving on disaster teams for Hurricanes Hugo and Andrew and serving on the Southwest Michigan Board of Directors. She served as chair of the Board of Directors of the Kalamazoo chapter for two terms.

She also served as president of the Regional Council of the Alzheimer's Association of Southwest Michigan, and as president of Area Agency on Aging from 1989 to 1990.

Ongley has been a longtime member of the Ladies' Library Association of Kalamazoo. The Ladies Library Association undertook an extensive renovation with the help of Betty Ongley's guidance and leadership. She served as its president from 2008 to 2010 and has been a member since 1999, and served on its Board until 2020. Her efforts to help preserve the Ladies Library Association Building were instrumental in its preservation and receipt of the State History Award in Historic Restoration.

Ongley cofounded the Kalamazoo Russian Cultural Association and its partnership between Kalamazoo and Pushkin, Saint Petersburg, and served as a member of many delegations to Pushkin.

Ongley served on the Board of Directors of the Southwest Michigan Land Conservancy from 2002 to 2018 and as its president for three terms.

The University of Michigan included Ongley in their Michigan Veteran Feminist Oral History Project 2003-2004.

In 2016, the Portage City Council honored Ongley on her 90th birthday.

== Other Awards and Honors ==
In 1981, the Michigan House of Representatives and the Michigan State Senate passed House Concurrent Resolution No. 79, Tribute to Betty Lee Ongley, commemorating her outstanding service as Chairperson of the Kalamazoo Alcohol and Drug Abuse Council.

In 1985, Ongley was awarded the YWCA of Kalamazoo's first Lifetime Woman of Achievement Award.

In 2009, Ongley was among eight business people, community leaders, and organizations recognized at the Kalamazoo Institute of Arts.

In 2016, Ongley was awarded the Rotary Club of Kalamazoo's Red Rose Citation.

In 2009, Ongley was awarded the ATHENA International Award, selected by the Kalamazoo Regional Chamber of Commerce with a Special Tribute issued by the State of Michigan and Governor Jennifer Granholm.

In 2017, undeveloped land was donated to the City of Portage by Claudette Reid and Richard Kraas to establish a preserve in Ongley's honor.
