= Portage Central High School =

High school in Portage, Kalamazoo County, Michigan

Location
- 8135 South Westnedge Avenue; Portage, Michigan 49002; United States; 42°11′53″N 85°35′21″W

Information
- School type: Public
- Founded: 1922 (As Portage Agricultural School)
- School district: Portage Public Schools
- Superintendent: Johnny Edwards
- Principal: Eric Alburtus
- Teaching staff: 67.10
- Grades: 9–12
- Enrollment: 1,391 (2024–2025)
- Student to teacher ratio: 20.73
- Area: Urban
- Color
- Team name: Mustangs
- Website: Portage Central website

Student assessments
- 2021–22 school year Change vs. prior year

M-STEP 11th grade proficiency rates (Science / Social Studies)
- Advanced %: 24.3 / 11.6
- Proficient %: 30.1 / 35.6
- PR. Proficient %: 15.8 / 41.6
- Not Proficient %: 29.8 / 11.2

Average test scores
- SAT Total: 1085.7 (▼ −15.1)

Portage Central High School (PCHS) is a high school in Portage, Michigan.

== History ==
The high school has resided in 3 separate building over its history.

=== History 1922-1949 ===
The building of the original high school building was completed in 1922 as Portage Agricultural School. This building was in use through 1949, and was used for a long period of time as the Portage Public Schools (PPS) administration building. In August 2014, it was demolished.

=== History 1949-2011 ===
A new school was constructed during the 1940s and began use in 1949 as Portage Township High School. In 1963, the name was changed to Portage High School when Portage became a city. In 1966 the building became too small with approximately 1,500 students, and the school split into two schools, Portage Central High School and Portage Northern High School. In January 1998 Portage Central High School, along with Portage Northern High School, became an official International Baccalaureate (IB) World School, governed by the International Baccalaureate Organization.

=== History 2011-Present ===
In the summer of 2009, the school district began construction of a new building for the high school, adjacent to the old building. Part of the old building was torn down to make room for the new school, and the new school was built around the old auditorium. During construction, some shop classes were held in Portage Central Middle School. Music and social studies classes were held in the former Waylee Elementary. In the summer of 2011, the old high school was torn down. The grand opening of the new building was August 26, 2011, and it opened for classes on September 6, 2011.

== Notable alumni ==
- Pete Metzelaars - football player for the Seattle Seahawks, Buffalo Bills, Carolina Panthers and Detroit Lions, NFL coach
- Mike Hart - former minor league manager and MLB player (Texas Rangers)
- Kirt Ojala - former MLB player (Florida Marlins)
- Lindsay Tarpley - soccer player, Olympic gold medalist
- Eric Alexander - professional soccer player for the New York Red Bulls
- Shannon Kane - actress in Madea's Big Happy Family (film), The Collection (film), and Hollywood Heights (TV series)
- Michael "Miles" Standish - businessman, author, rare coin expert

== Athletics ==
Central High is a member of the SMAC (Southwestern Michigan Athletic Conference).
