= Shannon Boxx =

American soccer player (born 1977)

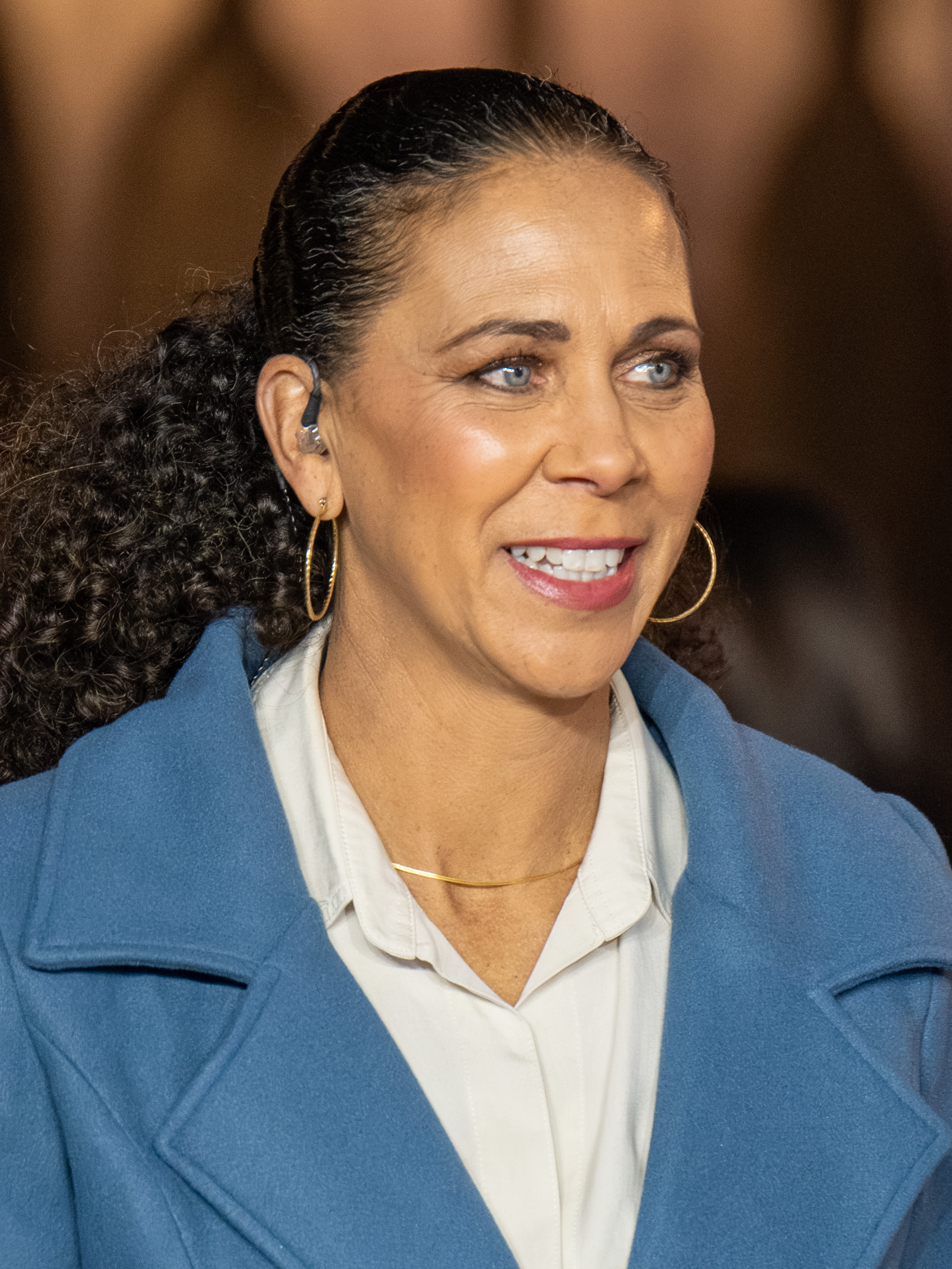
- Boxx in 2025

Personal information
- Full name: Shannon Leigh Boxx Spearman
- Birth name: Shannon Leigh Boxx
- Date of birth: June 29, 1977 (age 49)
- Place of birth: Fontana, California, United States
- Height: 5 ft 8 in (1.73 m)
- Position: Midfielder

College career
Years	Team	Apps	(Gls)
1995–1998	Notre Dame Fighting Irish	101	(39)

Senior career*
Years	Team	Apps	(Gls)
1994	Ajax of Los Angeles		
1999	Boston Renegades		
1999–2000	1. FC Saarbrücken		
2000	Ajax of Los Angeles		
2001–2002	San Diego Spirit	41	(5)
2003	New York Power	21	(1)
2005	Ajax of Los Angeles		
2009	Los Angeles Sol	19	(3)
2010	Saint Louis Athletica	6	(1)
2010	FC Gold Pride	14	(0)
2011	magicJack	10	(0)
2013–2015	Chicago Red Stars	7	(0)

International career
2003–2015	United States	195	(27)
Medal record
Olympic Games
Gold medal – first place	2004 Athens	Team
Gold medal – first place	2008 Beijing	Team
Gold medal – first place	2012 London	Team
FIFA Women's World Cup
Bronze medal – third place	2003 United States	Team
Bronze medal – third place	2007 China	Team
Silver medal – second place	2011 Germany	Team
Gold medal – first place	2015 Canada	Team
- * Club domestic league appearances and goals

Shannon Leigh Boxx Spearman (née Boxx; born June 29, 1977) is an American retired soccer player and former member of the United States women's national soccer team, playing the defensive midfielder position. She last played club soccer for the Chicago Red Stars in the American National Women's Soccer League. She won gold medals with the United States at the 2004 Athens Olympics, 2008 Beijing Olympics, and 2012 London Olympics. She has also finished third place or better with the US at the 2003, 2007, 2011 and 2015 FIFA Women's World Cups. She was a finalist for the 2005 FIFA World Player of the Year award, and won an NCAA Women's Soccer Championship with Notre Dame in 1995. Shannon Boxx announced her retirement from international and club soccer after winning the 2015 FIFA Women's World Cup. She played her last game on October 21, 2015, when the USWNT tied with Brazil as part of their victory tour.

Boxx is the younger sister of Gillian Boxx, who won a gold medal at the 1996 Olympics with the United States softball team.

Boxx was diagnosed with lupus in 2007 when she was 30 years old, and went public with her diagnosis shortly before the 2012 London Olympics at which she won gold with the United States team.

In 2020, Boxx joined the ownership group of Angel City FC of the National Women's Soccer League.

In 2022, Boxx was inducted into the National Soccer Hall of Fame.

== Early life ==
The multiracial Boxx, whose biological father was Black, was raised by her white single mother in Southern California. In a 2008 interview, she remembered that she had little contact with her African American heritage until she went to Notre Dame:

For me, I really learned about my other half. I took African American studies. I majored in it. I think that was one of the best things I could have ever done. My mom couldn't teach me those things. So I went and taught myself and learned those things when I was at Notre Dame.

=== Youth Club ===
From U/12-U/18, Boxx played for the Torrance United Waves Soccer Club, Torrance, California, and helped to lead them to 4 State Cup Championships and two trips to the USYSA National Championship Final Four in 1993 and 1994 at U/17 and U/19.

=== High school ===
From 1991 to 1995, Boxx attended South Torrance High School, where she was a four-sport athlete, playing soccer, volleyball, softball and basketball. She was named to the Parade All-America team for girls' soccer in 1995.

=== College ===
Boxx played for the Notre Dame Fighting Irish from 1995 to 1998. She helped the team win the school's first NCAA Women's Soccer Championship in 1995, beating defending champions North Carolina in the semifinal. Boxx was named to the All-Big East team in 1995, 1996 and 1997, and is tied for the most soccer games played for the Irish at 101 games.

==== College statistics ====
College	GP/GS	Goals	Assists	Total points	Win–loss–tie
Notre Dame 1995	25/21	7	10	24	21–2–2
Notre Dame 1996	26/25	12	16	40	24–2–0
Notre Dame 1997	25/25	13	17	43	23–1–1
Notre Dame 1998	25/25	7	14	28	21–3–1

== Professional career ==
=== 1999–2000 ===
In 1999, Boxx played for the Boston Renegades of the W-League, and then went to Germany to play for 1. FC Saarbrücken in the women's Bundesliga. However, she was unhappy and considered retiring from soccer.

=== WUSA ===
In 2001, Women's United Soccer Association began play, and Boxx was drafted by the San Diego Spirit in the third round of the entry draft, with the 19th pick overall.

In the 2001 season, Boxx started all 21 matches for the Spirit, missing 20 minutes of the entire season, and was named to the All-WUSA team. However, her playing time was reduced the following season, and in September 2002, she was sent to the New York Power, in a six-player trade that gave San Diego the first overall pick in the 2003 draft, used to select Aly Wagner.

With New York, Boxx returned to form, starting all 21 games, scoring once and assisting a career-high eight times, and was named to the 2003 All-WUSA squad. Former women's national team coach and league commissioner Tony DiCicco called Boxx "the best in our league at (defensive midfield) – physical, strong, technical".

WUSA	GP/GS	MIN	Goals	Assists	Total points	Win–loss–tie
San Diego Spirit 2001	21/21	1870	3	5	11	7–7–7
San Diego Spirit 2002	20/15	1349	2	2	6	5–11–5
New York Power 2003	21/21	1868	1	8	10	7–9–5

=== WPS ===
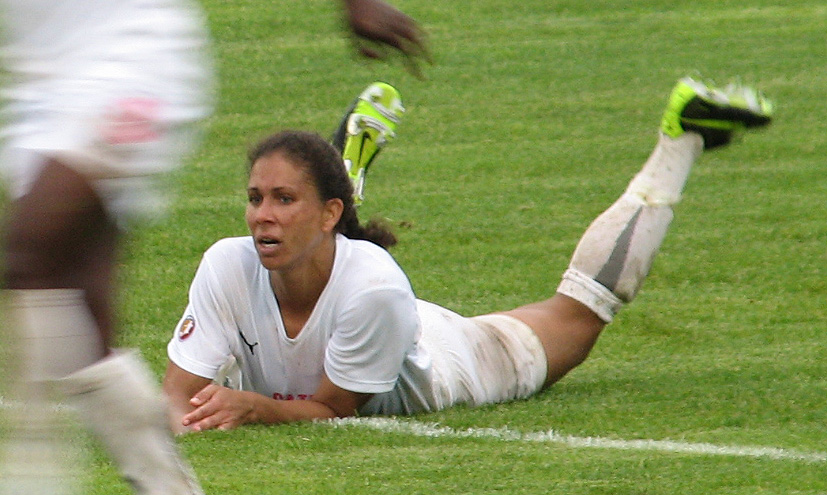
Shannon Boxx with Saint Louis Athletica in 2010.

In 2009, Boxx signed to the Los Angeles Sol for the inaugural season of Women's Professional Soccer and was named team captain. She started in 18 of the 19 matches she played for the Sol, scoring three goals with three assists. Boxx was named to the WPS First Team and played in the WPS All-Star Game. The Sol finished in first place during the regular season with a 12–3–5 record.

In 2010, she was signed to the Saint Louis Athletica during the Los Angeles Sol dispersal draft.

Later in the season after Saint Louis Athletica folded, she was traded to the FC Gold Pride. Boxx helped the team win the WPS regular season title and championship. She started in 19 of the 20 games she played in, while scoring one goal and providing five assists. She was a WPS All-Star Game starter and received the fifth overall votes.

For the 2011 WPS season, Boxx signed with magicJack and played 833 minutes in 10 games starting in them all. She helped the club make a run to the playoffs in the second half of the season and win the quarterfinal match against the Boston Breakers.

=== NWSL ===
In 2013, she joined Chicago Red Stars in the new National Women's Soccer League. Due to injury Boxx played 2 matches in 2013, played in 5 matches in 2014 due to pregnancy and birth of her first child, and in 2015 played 4 times due World Cup duties. On July 27, 2015, Boxx announced retirement from NWSL and Red Stars effective immediately.

== International career ==
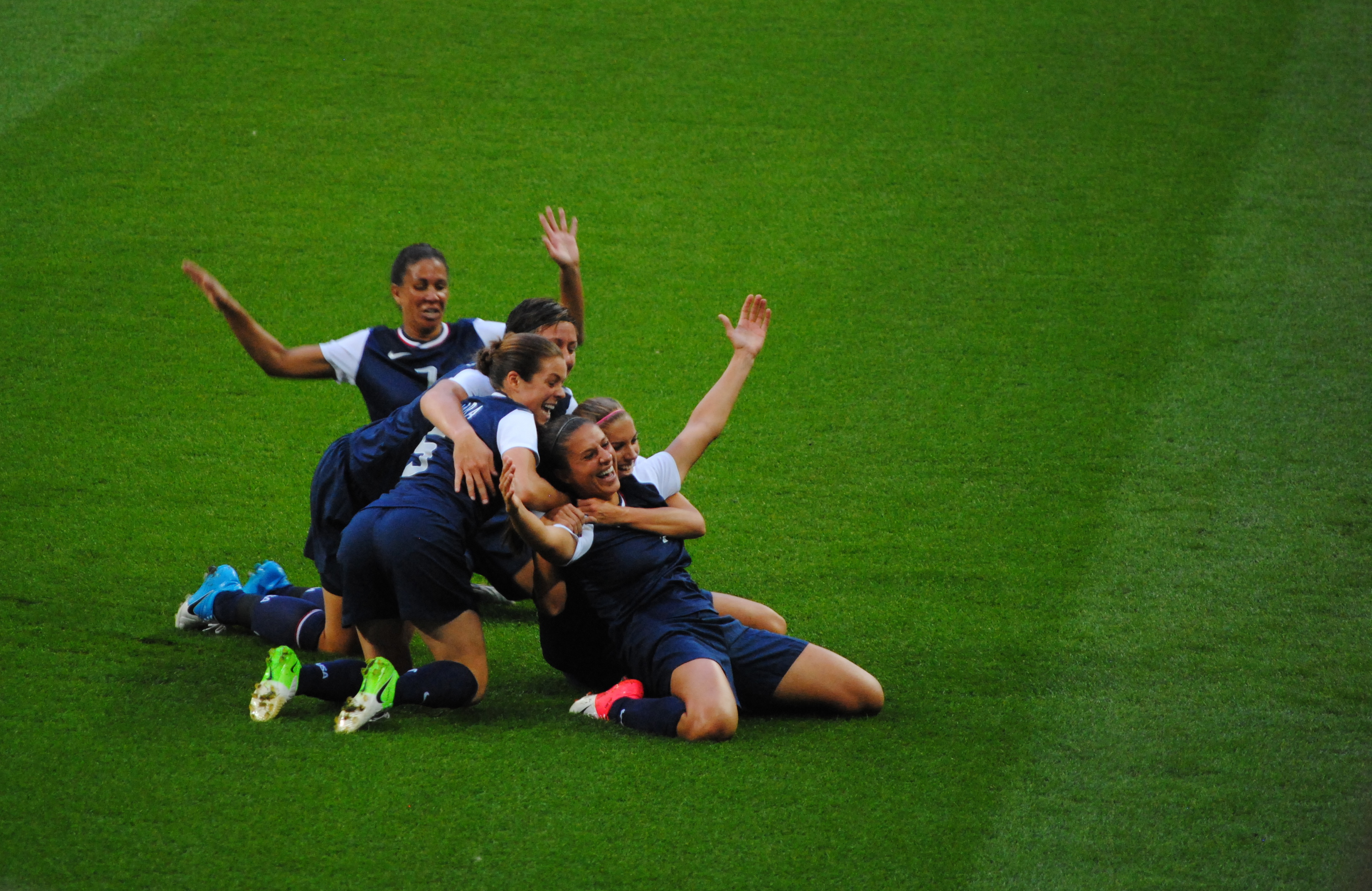
Boxx and the USWNT celebrate after a goal in the Gold medal match against Japan, at the 2012 Summer Olympics. Back to front: Boxx-7, Wambach-14, O'Hara-5, Morgan-13, Lloyd-10

Although Boxx was a member of the United States Under-21 national team pool, she did not receive her first senior cap until August 2003, when U.S. national team coach April Heinrichs named her to the team's 2003 FIFA Women's World Cup squad, making her the first uncapped player to be named to a U.S. Women's World Cup squad. Prior to the call-up, following the suspension of WUSA, Boxx had planned to take a coaching position at Cal State-Dominguez Hills and pursue a graduate degree at Pepperdine University.

Boxx scored a goal in each of the two pre-World Cup friendlies, against Costa Rica and Mexico, and in the opening match of the World Cup against Sweden, Boxx became the first American woman to score three goals in her first three matches with the national team.

Boxx started five matches at the Women's World Cup, scoring again against Canada in the third place match. She was voted the player of the match against Canada by the FIFA Technical Study Group, who said Boxx "seized control of the game, spurred on her team-mates and finally scored the decisive goal in USA's victory".

Boxx started 31 of 32 national team matches she played in 2004, including all six matches at the 2004 Olympics, where she scored a goal, assisted on another and helped the team win a gold medal. She scored eight goals over the course of the year, including a hat trick against Trinidad and Tobago in an Olympic qualifying match. Boxx came in seventh in the voting for the 2004 FIFA World Player of the Year award.

In 2005, Boxx started all nine matches US national team matches, playing all but 23 minutes of all matches played. She was a finalist for the 2005 FIFA World Player of the Year, coming in third behind Birgit Prinz and Marta.

Boxx missed most of 2006, first for surgery to repair torn cartilage in her right hip, and then for torn medial collateral ligaments she suffered on her first day back in training with the national team. She returned in 2007 after an eight-month layoff, and was named to the United States' squad for the 2007 FIFA Women's World Cup. Boxx helped the team reach the semifinal match against Brazil, but she was sent off after receiving two yellow cards, and the United States went on to lose 4–0. Boxx played every minute of all five U.S. games in the 2008 Summer Olympics in Beijing.

In 2011, she played in all but one of the World Cup games, earning defensive team honors for her efforts throughout the tournament. During the World Cup final against Japan, which went to overtime penalty shoot-out, Boxx was one of the Americans elected to take one of the penalty kicks, and had her shot saved by Japan's goalkeeper Ayumi Kaihori.

National team	GP/GS	MIN	Goals	Assists	Total points	Win–loss–tie
2003	9/9	762	4	0	8	7–1–1
2004	32/31	2714	8	5	21	26–2–4
2005	9/9	733	1	1	3	8–0–1
2006	9/9	793	1	1	3	6–0–3
2007	10/8	623	2	2	6	10–0–0
2008	33/33	2747	2	4	8	34–1–1
2009	8/7	614	2	0	4	7–0–1
2010	18/18	1399	1	5	7	7–1–1
2011	17/17	1344	1	2	4	13–3–4
2012	27/23	1836	3	3	9	27–1–3

(*Correct as of December 15, 2012)

=== International goals ===
Key (expand for notes on "international goals" and sorting)
Location	Geographic location of the venue where the competition occurred Sorted by country name first, then by city name
Lineup	Start – played entire match on minute (off player) – substituted on at the minute indicated, and player was substituted off at the same time off minute (on player) – substituted off at the minute indicated, and player was substituted on at the same time (c) – captain Sorted by minutes played
#	NumberOfGoals.goalNumber scored by the player in the match (alternate notation to Goal in match)
Min	The minute in the match the goal was scored. For list that include caps, blank indicates played in the match but did not score a goal.
Assist/pass	The ball was passed by the player, which assisted in scoring the goal. This column depends on the availability and source of this information.
penalty or pk	Goal scored on penalty-kick which was awarded due to foul by opponent. (Goals scored in penalty-shoot-out, at the end of a tied match after extra-time, are not included.)
Score	The match score after the goal was scored. Sorted by goal difference, then by goal scored by the player's team
Result	The final score. Sorted by goal difference in the match, then by goal difference in penalty-shoot-out if it is taken, followed by goal scored by the player's team in the match, then by goal scored in the penalty-shoot-out. For matches with identical final scores, match ending in extra-time without penalty-shoot-out is a tougher match, therefore precede matches that ended in regulation
aet	The score at the end of extra-time; the match was tied at the end of 90' regulation
pso	Penalty-shoot-out score shown in parentheses; the match was tied at the end of extra-time
	Green background color – exhibition or closed door international friendly match
	Yellow background color – match at an invitational tournament
	Red background color – Olympic women's football qualification match
	Pink background color – Olympic women's football tournament
	Blue background color – FIFA women's world cup final tournament
NOTE: some keys may not apply for a particular football player

	Date	Location	Opponent	Lineup	#	Min	Assist/pass	Score	Result	Competition
1	2003-09-01	Carson	Costa Rica	Start	1.1	53	Julie Foudy	3–0	5–0	Friendly
2	2003-09-07	San Jose	Mexico	off 61' (on Hucles)	1.1	10	Julie Foudy	1–0	5–0	Friendly
3	2003-09-21	Washington	Sweden	Start	1.1	78	Mia Hamm	3–1	3–1	World Cup: Group A
4	2003-10-11	Carson	Canada	Start	1.1	51	Mia Hamm	2–1	3–1	World Cup: third place match
5	2004-01-30	Shenzhen	Sweden	Start	1.1	13	Kristine Lilly	1–0	3–0	Four Nations Tournament
6	2004-02-25	San Jose	Trinidad & Tobago	Start	3.1	22	Abby Wambach	1–0	7–0	Olympic qualification
7	2004-02-25	San Jose	Trinidad & Tobago	Start	3.2	37	Mia Hamm	3–0	7–0	Olympic qualification
8	2004-02-25	San Jose	Trinidad & Tobago	Start	3.3	81	Aly Wagner	7–0	7–0	Olympic qualification
9	2004-03-03	San Jose	Costa Rica	off 60' (on Tarpley)	1.1	51	Shannon MacMillan	4–0	4–0	Olympic qualification: semifinal
10	2004-07-21	Blaine	Australia	on 46' (off Chastain)	1.1	56	Mia Hamm	1–1	3–1	Friendly
11	2004-08-11	Heralklio	Greece	Start	1.1	14	Mia Hamm	1–0	3–0	Olympics: Group G
12	2004-12-08	Carson	Mexico	Start	1.1	44	unassisted	4–0	5–0	Friendly
13	2005-07-23	Carson	Iceland	off 82' (on Woznuk)	1.1	69	Abby Wambach	3–0	3–0	Friendly
14	2006-01-18	Guangzhou	Norway	Start	1.1	77	Kristine Lilly	2–0	3–1	Four Nations Tournament
15	2007-07-28	San Jose	Japan	off 85' (on Hucles)	1.1	17	Stephanie Lopez	1–0	4–1	Friendly
16	2007-08-25	Carson	Finland	off 79' (on Wagner)	1.1	30	Kristine Lilly	1–0	4–0	Friendly
17	2007-09-22	Tianjin	England	off 82' (on Lloyd)	1.1	57	Cat Whitehill	2–0	3–0	World Cup: quarterfinal
18	2008-01-20	Guangzhou	China	Start	1.1	77	Becky Sauerbrunn	1–0	1–0	Four Nations Tournament
19	2009-03-11	Faro	Sweden	Start	1.1	90	Megan Rapinoe	1–1	1–1 (pso 3–4)	Algarve Cup: final
20	2009-05-25	Toronto	Canada	Start	1.1	2	Heather Mitts	1–0	4–0	Friendly
21	2010-03-28	San Diego	Mexico	Start; (c)	1.1	43	unassisted	2–0	3–0	Friendly
22	2011-03-07	Quarteira	Finland	off 46' (on Lindsey)	1.1	8	Carli Lloyd	1–0	4–0	Algarve Cup: Group A
23	2012-04-03	Chiba	Brazil	Start	1.1	23	Lauren Holiday	2–0	3–0	Kirin Challenge Cup
24	2012-09-16	Carson	Australia	on 46' (off Lloyd)	1.1	63	penalty	2–1	2–1	Friendly
25	2012-09-19	Commerce	Australia	on 46' (off Holiday)	1.1	63	Megan Rapinoe	5–2	6–2	Friendly
26	2013-02-09	Jacksonville	Scotland	off 66' (on Averbuch)	1.1	52	Christen Press	3–0	4–1	Friendly
27	2013-03-06	Albufeira	Iceland	Start	1.1	62	Christie Rampone	2–0	3–0	Algarve Cup: Group B

== In popular culture ==
=== Video games ===
Boxx was featured along with her national teammates in the EA Sports' FIFA video game series in FIFA 16, the first time women players were included in the game.

=== Ticker-tape parade and White House honor ===
Following the United States' win at the 2015 FIFA Women's World Cup, Boxx and her teammates became the first women's sports team to be honored with a ticker-tape parade in New York City. Each player received a key to the city from Mayor Bill de Blasio. In October of the same year, the team was honored by President Barack Obama at the White House.

== See also ==
- List of footballers with 100 or more caps
- List of Olympic medalists in football
- List of multiple Olympic gold medalists in one event
- List of multiple Olympic gold medalists
- List of 2004 Summer Olympics medal winners
- List of 2008 Summer Olympics medal winners
- All-time Los Angeles Sol roster
- All-time Saint Louis Athletica roster
