= Karina LeBlanc =

Canadian soccer player, coach, and manager (born 1980)

Karina LeBlanc CM
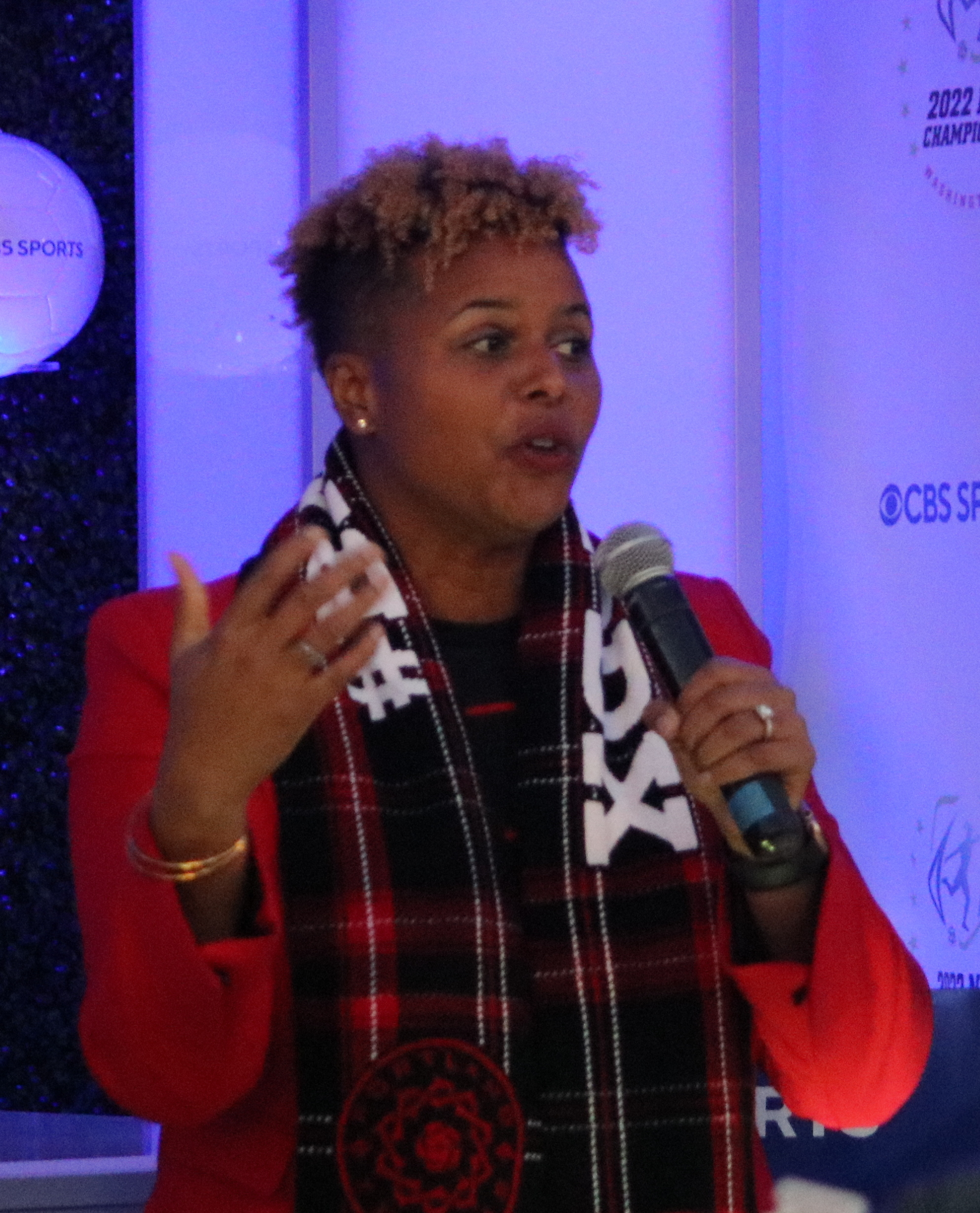
- LeBlanc in 2022

Personal information
- Full name: Karina Chenelle LeBlanc
- Date of birth: March 30, 1980 (age 46)
- Place of birth: Atlanta, Georgia, U.S.
- Height: 1.73 m (5 ft 8 in)
- Position: Goalkeeper

College career
Years	Team	Apps	(Gls)
1997–2000	Nebraska Cornhuskers	80	(0)

Senior career*
Years	Team	Apps	(Gls)
2001–2003	Boston Breakers	2	(0)
2004	Montreal Xtreme	1	(0)
2005–2006	New Jersey Wildcats	18	(0)
2009	Los Angeles Sol	19	(0)
2010	Philadelphia Independence	14	(0)
2011	magicJack	1	(0)
2012	Sky Blue FC	0	(0)
2013	Portland Thorns FC	21	(0)
2014–2015	Chicago Red Stars	29	(0)

International career^{‡}
1998–2015	Canada	110	(0)
Medal record
Women's soccer
Representing Canada
Olympic Games
Bronze medal – third place	2012 London	Team
Pan American Games
Bronze medal – third place	2007 Rio de Janeiro	Team
Gold medal – first place	2011 Guadalajara	Team
- * Club domestic league appearances and goals as of September 6, 2015 ‡ National team caps and goals as of May 31, 2015

Karina Chenelle LeBlanc CM (born March 30, 1980) is an American-born Canadian former professional soccer goalkeeper and former general manager of the Portland Thorns FC. She played for the Canadian national team and multiple professional women's teams in the United States over her fourteen-year career.

== Early life ==
LeBlanc was born in Atlanta, Georgia, to a Dominica father (from Portsmouth) and a Jamaican mother, Vans LeBlanc and Winsome LeBlanc, who had temporarily relocated to Atlanta to avoid the dangers of Hurricane David. LeBlanc grew up in Dominica until age eight when her family moved to Maple Ridge, British Columbia. LeBlanc began playing soccer at age 12 and was named one of the top 20 Division I recruits by USA Today in 1997, even though Maple Ridge Secondary School did not have a girls soccer team. She was also an all-provincial basketball player and was voted British Columbia's Most Defensive Player in basketball in 1997.

=== University of Nebraska ===
LeBlanc attended the University of Nebraska–Lincoln and earned a degree in business administration. She played goalkeeper for the Nebraska Cornhuskers from 1997 to 2000 and became one of the school's most decorated goalkeepers in the history of the program. She was a finalist for the Hermann Trophy in 2000 and named to the 2001 Umbro Select All-Star Classic Women's Elite College Team. She was also a two-time All-Big 12 selection and was named an All-American.

== Club career ==
=== Boston Breakers ===
LeBlanc played for Boston Breakers in the Women's United Soccer Association, the first women's professional soccer league in the United States.

=== Montreal Xtreme, New Jersey wildCat ===
In 2004, she played for the Montreal Xtreme of the W-League followed by the New Jersey Wildcats from 2005 to 2006.

=== Los Angeles Sol ===
In 2009, she was acquired in the first round (fifth overall) of the 2009 WPS General Draft by the Los Angeles Sol. She started and played in 19 regular-season matches for the team, saving 78 of 93 shots. LeBlanc was named to the 2009 WPS All-Star Team Starting XI.

=== Philadelphia Independence ===
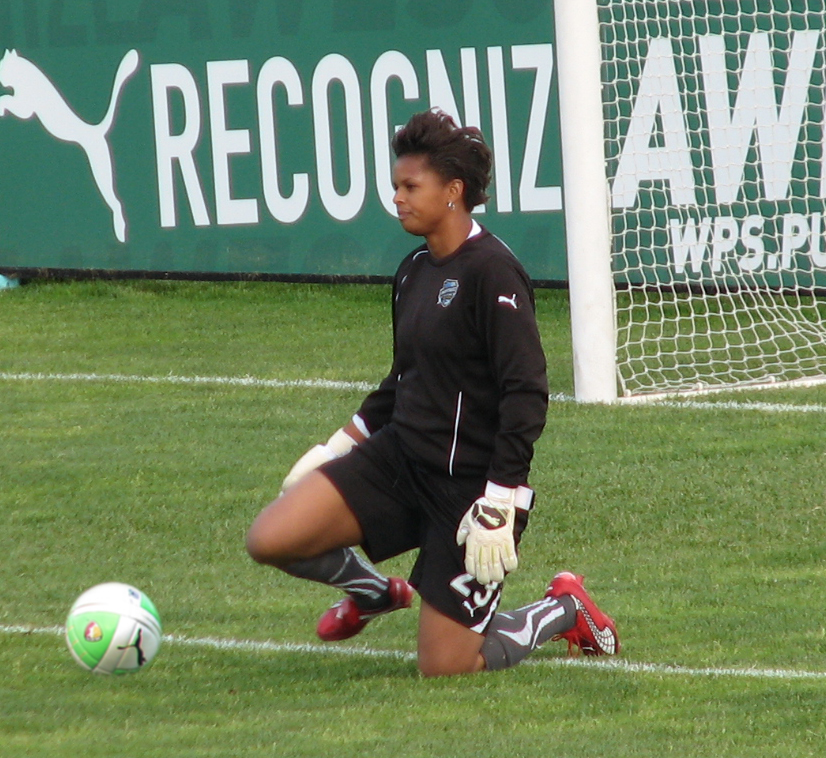
LeBlanc playing for the Philadelphia Independence in 2010

In 2010, she was selected in the first round (second overall) of the 2010 Los Angeles Sol Dispersal Draft by the Philadelphia Independence.

=== magicJack ===
In August 2011, it was reported that LeBlanc had signed with magicJack and stepped in as goalkeeper after Hope Solo was sidelined with an injury.

=== Sky Blue FC ===
In December 2011, she was signed to the Sky Blue FC for the 2012 season; however, the WPS league folded before the season began.

=== Portland Thorns FC ===
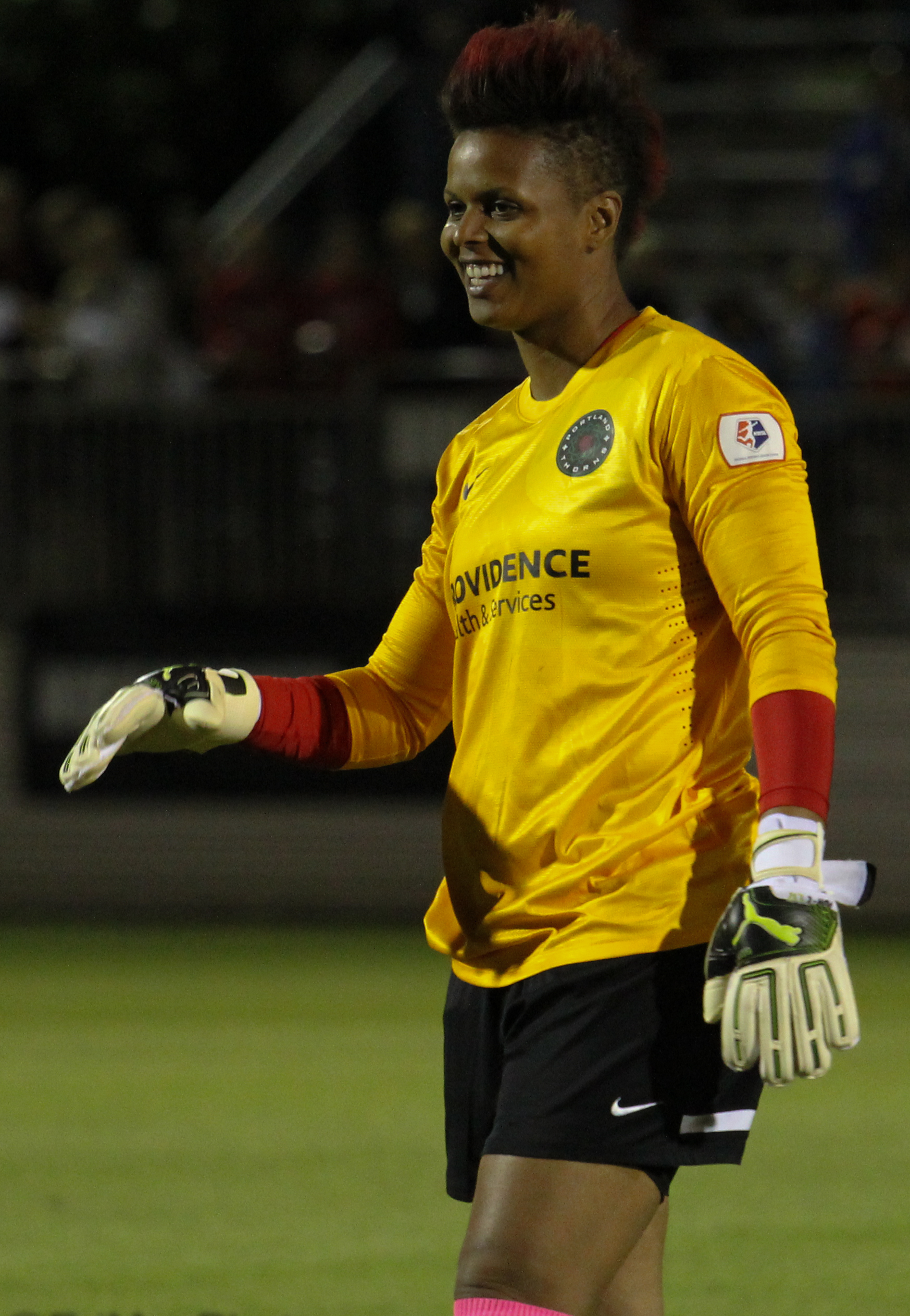
LeBlanc played for the Portland Thorns in 2013, winning the NWSL Championship that year.

On January 11, 2013, it was announced that LeBlanc was one of two Canadian national team members selected to join the Portland Thorns FC by way of weighted allocation. On January 13, 2014, Portland Thorns FC announced that LeBlanc had been traded to the Chicago Red Stars in exchange for the 2nd round draft pick in the 2015 NWSL College Draft.

=== Chicago Red Stars ===
LeBlanc finished her 2014 season with 76 saves and a goal against per game average of 1.0, in 21 matches; just behind league leaders Alyssa Naeher's 106 saves, and Hope Solo's .90 goal against average.

Because of participation in 2015 FIFA Women's World Cup LeBlanc played eight matches for Red Stars in 2015. At the end of 2015 season, LeBlanc called it a career and retired from professional soccer. For her performance in her last professional match LeBlanc was named NWSL Player of the week of week 21.

== International career ==
LeBlanc represented Canada at five FIFA Women's World Cups, at the 2008 Olympics and at two Pan American Games, winning the gold medal with the national team at the 2011 Pan Am Games by stopping two penalty shots in the final. She made her one hundredth appearance for Canada in March 2012 and later that year was part of the Canadian team that won the bronze medal at the 2012 Summer Olympics. She made her 100th start for Canada in a 3–0 win over Finland in the opening game of the 2014 Cyprus Cup, keeping a clean sheet. Prior to 2015 FIFA Women's World Cup, LeBlanc announced her retirement from international soccer at the end of the tournament.

== Coaching career ==
LeBlanc served as an assistant coach at Rutgers University from 2005 to 2009. She has also served as a goalkeeper coach with the Canadian under-15 national team, and developed goalkeeping clinics throughout the United States and Canada.

== Management career ==
CONCACAF hired LeBlanc to be the head of women's soccer in July 2018. She left that position in 2021 to become general manager of the Portland Thorns FC. Her predecessor, Gavin Wilkinson, was removed because of the 2021 NWSL abuse scandal.

On Oct. 9, 2024, RAJ Sports, owner of the Thorns, announced that LeBlanc would transition out of her role as general manager at the end of the 2024 season, and on Oct. 24, announced that she would become Executive Vice President of Strategic Growth Development. She was succeeded as general manager by Jeff Agoos.

== Honours ==
Portland Thorns FC

- NWSL Championship: 2013

Individual

- Canada Soccer Hall of Fame (2022)
- She received the Order of Canada (2022) "for her contributions to the sport of soccer worldwide, and for her use of soccer as a tool for social change."
- She has had a soccer field named after her in her hometown of Maple Ridge

== Personal life ==
LeBlanc was raised Roman Catholic but later became a Baptist while studying in college. LeBlanc married Jason Mathot in October 2016. On March 24, 2020, she gave birth to their daughter, Paris.

== See also ==
- List of Olympic medalists in football
- List of women's footballers with 100 or more international caps
- List of players who have appeared in multiple FIFA Women's World Cups
- List of 2012 Summer Olympics medal winners
- List of UNICEF Goodwill Ambassadors
- List of Canadian sports personalities
- List of Canada women's international soccer players
- List of 2011 Pan American Games medalists
- List of Los Angeles Sol players
- List of Chicago Red Stars players
- List of Philadelphia Independence players
- List of Portland Thorns FC players
