= Portage Public Schools =

School district in Michigan

Address
- 8107 Mustang Drive Portage, Kalamazoo County, Michigan, 49002; United States

District information
- Grades: Pre-Kindergarten-12
- Superintendent: Johnny Edwards
- Schools: 14
- Budget: $138,927,000 2022-2023 expenditures
- NCES District ID: 2628950

Students and staff
- Students: 8,497 (2024-2025)
- Teachers: 499.54 FTE (2024-2025)
- Staff: 1,039.04 FTE (2024-2025)
- Student–teacher ratio: 17.01 (2024-2025)

Other information
- Website: www.portageps.org

Portage Public Schools is a public school district in Kalamazoo County, Michigan. It serves most of Portage and parts of Kalamazoo, Pavilion Township, and Texas Township. Both high schools in the district are certified International Baccalaureate schools.

== History ==
The district was founded in 1922. The campus of Central High School was created that year, with the opening of a six-room school. A new high school was built in 1949. An 800-seat auditorium was added to it around 1972.

Portage Central High School opened in fall 2011. When the previous building was torn down in the summer of 2011, its 1972 auditorium was preserved and renovated as part of the new construction. Portage Northern High School was opened in fall 1965. The architect of Central High was TMP Associates, and the architect of Northern High was Trend Associates of Kalamazoo.

In 2019, Portage North Middle School was rebuilt. Portage Central Middle School, on the Central High School campus, was rebuilt in 2020.

== Schools ==
Schools in Portage Public Schools district
School	Address	Notes
High Schools (Grades 9-12)
Portage Central High School	8135 South Westnedge Avenue, Portage	Built 2011
Portage Northern High School	1000 Idaho Avenue, Portage	Built 1965
Portage Community High	1010 West Milham Avenue, Portage	
Middle Schools (Grades 6-8)
Portage West Middle School	7145 Moorsbridge Road, Portage	
Portage North Middle School	1100 W. Milham, Portage	Built 2019
Portage Central Middle School	8305 South Westnedge Ave., Portage	Built 2020.
Elementary Schools (Grades PreK-5)
Amberly Elementary School	6637 Amberly, Portage	
Angling Rd. Elementary School	5340 Angling Road, Portage	
Central Elementary School	8422 South Westnedge Ave, Portage	
Haverhill Elementary School	6633 Haverhill Ave, Portage	
Lake Center Elementary School	10011 Portage Road, Portage	
Moorsbridge Elementary School	7361 Moorsbridge Rd, Portage	
Woodland Elementary School	1401 Woodland Dr, Portage	
12th St. Elementary School	6501 South 12th Street, Portage	

=== Former schools ===
- Lexington Elementary School
- Milham Elementary School
- Pershing Elementary School
- Ramona Lane Elementary School - This building has been demolished.
- Waylee Elementary School - Now 12th Street. Building has been repurposed as the Administration and Technology building.
