= Kalamazoo Quest =

Defunct North American amateur women's soccer organization

The Kalamazoo Quest was a W-League club based in Kalamazoo, Michigan. The team folded after the 1999 season. The team was coached by Mike Haines.

== Year-by-year ==
Year	Division	League	Reg. season	Playoffs
1998	2	USL W-League W2	4th, Central	
1999	2	USL W-League W2	3rd, Central Division, Midwest Region	
