= Portage, Michigan =

- City
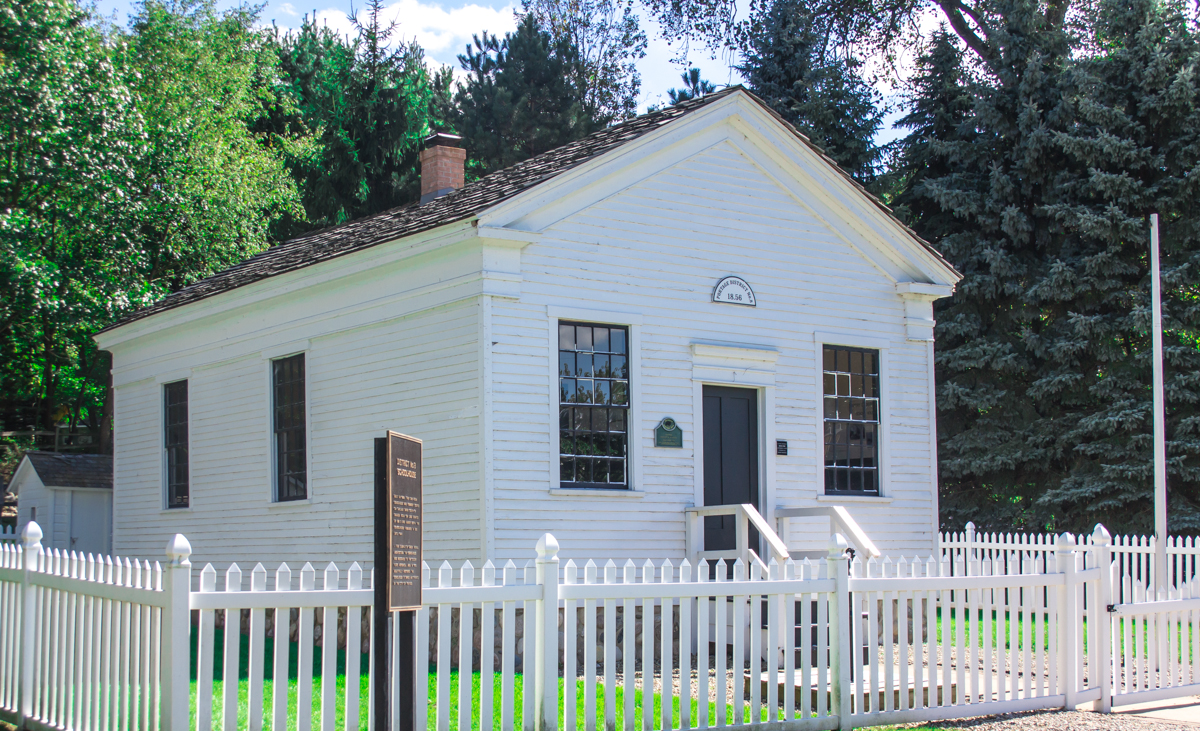
- Portage District No. 8 School
- Interactive map of Portage, Michigan
- Location within Michigan Location within the United States
- Coordinates: 42°12′35″N 85°35′19″W
- Country: United States
- State: Michigan
- County: Kalamazoo
- Settled: 1830
- Established: 1838 (Portage Township)
- Incorporated: 1963 (city)

Government
  - Type: Council-manager
  - Mayor: Patricia Randall
  - Manager: Patrick McGinnis
  - Clerk: Erica Eklov

Area
  - Total: 35.25 sq mi (91.30 km^{2})
  - Land: 32.29 sq mi (83.64 km^{2})
  - Water: 2.96 sq mi (7.66 km^{2})

Population (2020)
  - Total: 48,891
  - Density: 1,514.12/sq mi (584.61/km^{2})
- Time zone: UTC-5 (Eastern (EST))
  - Summer (DST): UTC-4 (EDT)
- ZIP code(s): 49002, 49024, 49081
- Area code: 269
- FIPS code: 26-65560
- GNIS feature ID: 635269
- Website: www.portagemi.gov

Portage is a city in Kalamazoo County, Michigan, United States. The population was 48,891 at the 2020 census. It is the smaller of the two main cities included in the Kalamazoo–Portage metropolitan area, which had a population of 261,670 in 2020.

== History ==
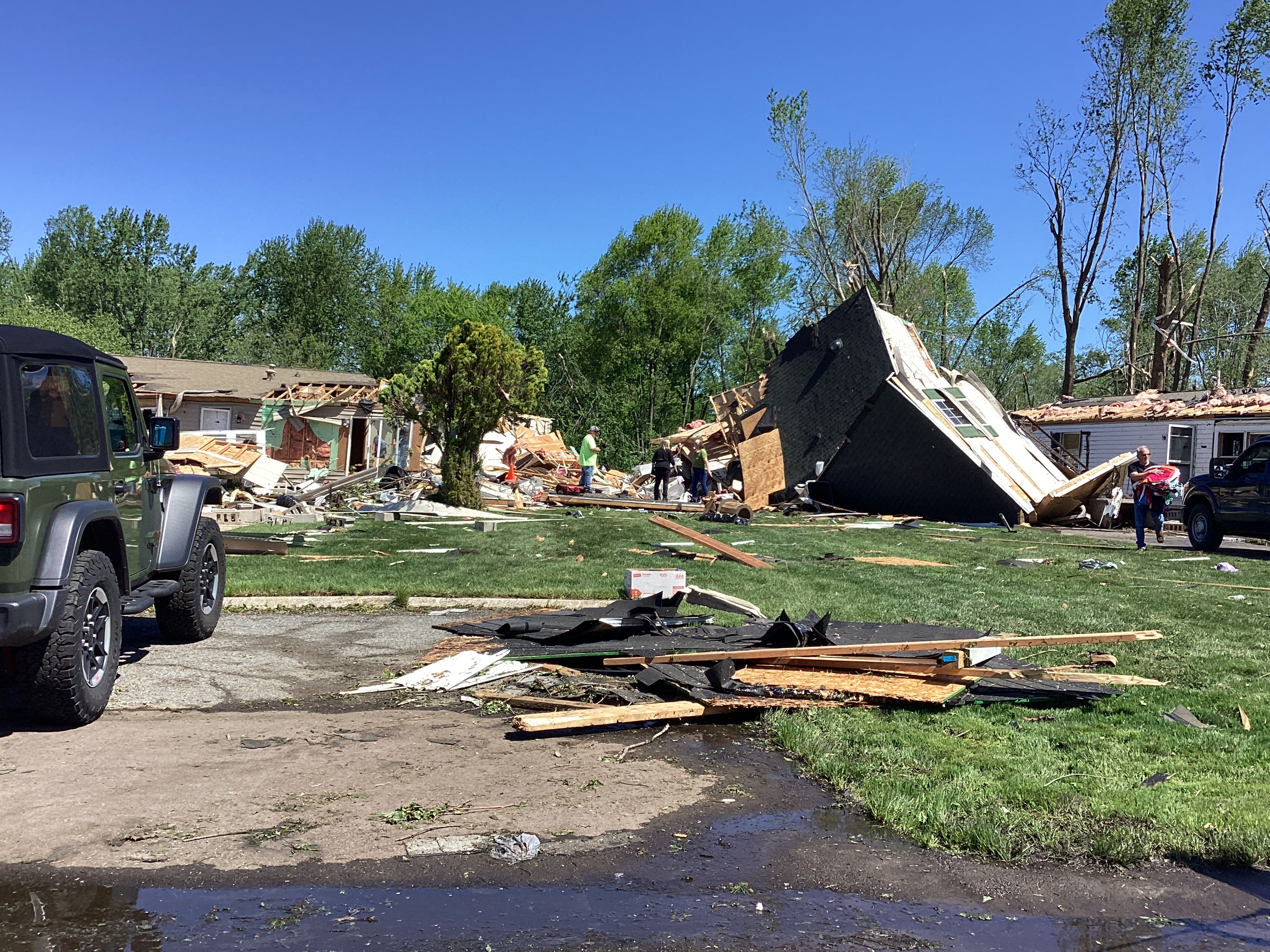
Mobile homes destroyed during high-end EF2 intensity in Portage

Portage was settled in 1830, and incorporated as a city in 1963.

On May 7, 2024, the city was struck by a high-end EF2 tornado, causing significant damage to homes and properties. A FedEx distribution center was severely damaged after the tornado caused part of the roof to collapse. Over 500 buildings were damaged, with 60 being destroyed, including a strip mall.

== Geography ==
According to the United States Census Bureau, the city has a total area of 35.17 square miles (91.09 km^{2}), of which 32.23 square miles (83.48 km^{2}) is land and 2.94 square miles (7.61 km^{2}) is water.

Austin Lake is in the southeast part of the city and was named for Moses Austin, who had emigrated to Portage Township from Genesee County, New York, in 1833. A settlement grew on the north shore of the lake, known as Austin or Austin Lake. A post office named "Austin's Lake" was established on May 18, 1850, with Austin as postmaster, and operated until August 15, 1853. The place was also a station on the Grand Rapids and Indiana Railroad in 1867. West Lake is adjacent to Austin Lake with Portage Road running between the two lakes.

== Demographics ==
Historical population
Census	Pop.	Note	%±
1970	33,590		—
1980	38,157		13.6%
1990	41,042		7.6%
2000	44,897		9.4%
2010	46,292		3.1%
2020	48,891		5.6%
U.S. Decennial Census

=== 2020 census ===
As of the 2020 census, Portage had a population of 48,891. The median age was 39.4 years. 22.1% of residents were under the age of 18 and 18.9% of residents were 65 years of age or older. For every 100 females there were 92.7 males, and for every 100 females age 18 and over there were 90.5 males age 18 and over.

99.4% of residents lived in urban areas, while 0.6% lived in rural areas.

There were 20,660 households in Portage, of which 28.4% had children under the age of 18 living in them. Of all households, 47.6% were married-couple households, 17.6% were households with a male householder and no spouse or partner present, and 27.4% were households with a female householder and no spouse or partner present. About 30.9% of all households were made up of individuals and 13.5% had someone living alone who was 65 years of age or older.

There were 21,714 housing units, of which 4.9% were vacant. The homeowner vacancy rate was 0.9% and the rental vacancy rate was 7.6%.

Racial composition as of the 2020 census
Race	Number	Percent
White	39,775	81.4%
Black or African American	2,549	5.2%
American Indian and Alaska Native	208	0.4%
Asian	2,244	4.6%
Native Hawaiian and Other Pacific Islander	11	0.0%
Some other race	778	1.6%
Two or more races	3,326	6.8%
Hispanic or Latino (of any race)	2,205	4.5%

=== 2010 census ===
At the 2010 census there were 46,292 people, 19,199 households, and 12,426 families living in the city. The population density was 1,436.3 inhabitants per square mile (554.6/km^{2}). There were 20,559 housing units at an average density of 637.9 units per square mile (246.3 units/km^{2}). The racial makeup of the city was 86.9% White, 4.9% African American, 0.4% Native American, 3.8% Asian, 1.0% from other races, and 3.0% from two or more races. Hispanic or Latino of any race were 3.1%.

Of the 19,199 households 32.4% had children under the age of 18 living with them, 50.1% were married couples living together, 10.9% had a female householder with no husband present, 3.8% had a male householder with no wife present, and 35.3% were non-families. 29.1% of households were one person and 10.5% were one person aged 65 or older. The average household size was 2.40 and the average family size was 2.98.

The median age was 38.1 years. 24.8% of residents were under the age of 18; 7.9% were between the ages of 18 and 24; 26.7% were from 25 to 44; 26.9% were from 45 to 64; and 13.6% were 65 or older. The gender makeup of the city was 47.9% male and 52.1% female.

=== 2000 census ===
As of the census of 2000, there were 44,897 people, 18,138 households, and 12,134 families living in the city. The population density was 1,394.2 inhabitants per square mile (538.3/km^{2}). There were 18,880 housing units at an average density of 586.3 units per square mile (226.4 units/km^{2}). The racial makeup of the city was 90.75% White, 3.73% African American, 0.30% Native American, 2.64% Asian, 0.02% Pacific Islander, 0.70% from other races, and 1.84% from two or more races. Hispanic or Latino of any race were 1.93% of the population.

Of the 18,138 households 34.2% had children under the age of 18 living with them, 54.4% were married couples living together, 9.7% had a female householder with no husband present, and 33.1% were non-families. 27.2% of households were one person and 8.4% were one person aged 65 or older. The average household size was 2.45 and the average family size was 3.01.

The age distribution was 26.4% under the age of 18, 8.5% from 18 to 24, 29.9% from 25 to 44, 23.4% from 45 to 64, and 11.8% 65 or older. The median age was 36 years. For every 100 females, there were 92.1 males. For every 100 females age 18 and over, there were 88.8 males.

The median household income was $49,410 and the median family income was $61,285. Males had a median income of $42,377 versus $29,399 for females. The per capita income for the city was $25,414. About 3.1% of families and 4.8% of the population were below the poverty line, including 4.9% of those under age 18 and 4.2% of those age 65 or over.

== Economy ==
Portage is the site of Pfizer's largest manufacturing facility, at 1,300 acres. The U.S. government prepped millions of doses of Pfizer-BioNTech's COVID-19 vaccine on December 13, 2020, for shipment to sites across the nation, a mammoth logistical undertaking in support of the most complex immunization program in history.

Health technology company Stryker Corporation was founded in neighboring Kalamazoo in 1941, and has been headquartered in Portage since 2023. In addition to its headquarters, Stryker operates multiple manufacturing facilities in Portage.

== Education ==
Most of Portage is in the Portage Public Schools school district. Some of Portage is in Comstock Public Schools, some is in Vicksburg Community Schools, and some is in Schoolcraft Community Schools.

== Notable people ==
- Eric Alexander (born 1988) – soccer player
- Phil Bozell (born 1983) – stock car racer
- Robert P. Burke (born 1962) – U.S. Navy admiral
- Lisa Byington (born 1976) – sports announcer
- Jeff Criswell (born 1999) – Major League Baseball (MLB) player
- Andrew Evans (born 1991) – discus thrower
- Timothy Granaderos (born 1986) – actor and model
- Tommy Henry (born 1997) – MLB player
- Carson Hocevar (born 2003) – stock car racer
- Pete Metzelaars (born 1960) – National Football League (NFL) player
- Margaret O'Brien (born 1973) – Michigan state politician
- Betty Lee Ongley – first female mayor in the State of Michigan
- Scott Parse (born 1984) – National Hockey League (NHL) player
- Jacob Peterson (born 1986) – soccer player
- B. J. Snow (born 1977) – soccer coach
- Ronda Stryker (born 1954) – director at Stryker Corporation
- Lindsay Tarpley (born 1983) – soccer player and two-time Olympic gold medalist
