= Japan–United States women's soccer rivalry =

International sports rivalry

Japan–United States women's football rivalry
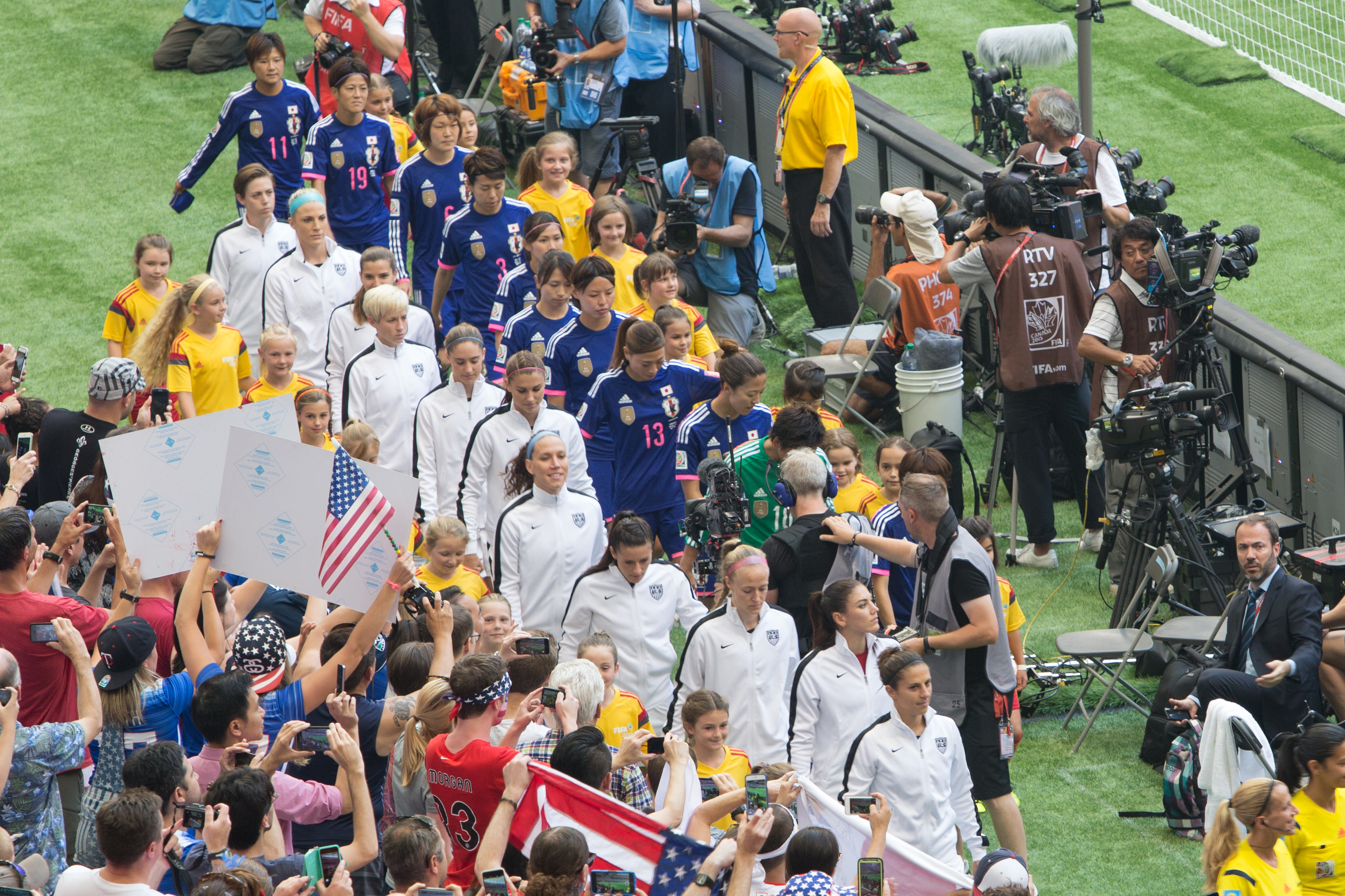
- Japan–United States final match at the 2015 FIFA Women's World Cup.
- Other names: USA vs. Japan; Japan vs. USA; USWNT vs. Nadeshiko Japan
- Teams: Japan; United States
- First meeting: United States 3–1 Japan; 1986 Mundialito; Jesolo, Italy (25 July 1986)
- Latest meeting: United States 0–1 Japan; Friendly; Seattle, Washington (15 April 2026)

Statistics
- Total meetings: 43
- Most wins: United States (32)
- All-time series: United States: 32; Draws: 8 Japan: 3
- Largest victory: United States 9–0 Japan; Friendly; Charlotte, North Carolina (29 April 1999)
- Longest win streak: United States (13)

The Japan–United States women's football rivalry is a sports rivalry between the national women's football teams of Japan and the United States, two of the most successful women's football nations in the world. However, the United States has dominated Japan since 1986, having won 31 of the 40 matches. The U.S. maintained a 13-match winning streak from 1986 through 2000. Japan upsets the U.S. 1–0, their first ever win in regulation for Japan, and subsequently the Algarve Cup final against Germany, but finished as the runners-up after a 4–3 loss.

Japan and the United States have played against each other four times in the Women's World Cup. Most notably, the 2011 World Cup final in which Japan won 3–1 on penalties, after a 2–2 draw in extra time, and the 2015 World Cup final, winning 5–2 by the U.S., as well as the gold medal game at the 2012 Summer Olympics, winning 2–1 also by the U.S., the quarterfinals of the 1995 World Cup, and the final group stage match of the 1991 World Cup. Overall, the U.S. has won four World Cups in 1991, 1999, 2015, and 2019, while Japan has won one World Cup in 2011.

The last meeting was on 14 April 2026 at Lumen Field in Seattle, Washington in the second match of the Women's International Friendlies.

== History ==
=== Early encounters ===
The first meeting of the teams occurred on 25 July 1986 at the Mundialito in Jesolo, Italy. The United States secured a 3–1 win, with one goal from April Heinrichs and a double from substitute Marcia McDermott. Futaba Kioka scored for Japan. At the Women's World Invitational Tournament (known as the Chunghua Cup), staged by Taiwan in December 1987, the United States beat Japan 1–0 with a goal scored by the defender Lori Henry. (Note: Other sources including RSSSF say that the United States was represented by a regional select team from the El Camino Women's Soccer League at this tournament.)

The United States defeated Japan 5–2 at the 1988 FIFA Women's Invitation Tournament in Panyu on 1 June 1988, as Carin Jennings-Gabarra scored a hat-trick. American coach Anson Dorrance characterized the Japan of that era as: "a team that was equally inexperienced like we were but lacking our athleticism and size".

After comfortable wins over Japan at both the 1991 and 1995 editions of the FIFA Women's World Cup, 3–0 and 4–0 respectively, the United States embarked on a three-match tour of Japan in May 1998. Coach Tony DiCicco described Japan as "one of our major Asian challengers" and "one of the most improved teams since the 1991 World Cup". The United States won all three games and when Japan attended Charlotte, North Carolina for another friendly in April 1999 DiCicco's team inflicted a record-equalling 9–0 defeat.

Japan avoided defeat by the United States for the first time on the occasion of their 14th meeting, a 1–1 friendly match at Bank One Ballpark in Phoenix, Arizona on 17 December 2000. The game was arranged as a farewell fixture for the retiring Carla Overbeck. A fatigued United States team, playing in a record 41st match of the year, dominated but conceded an equalizer to Homare Sawa after Brandi Chastain's opener.

The next two friendly fixtures were also drawn as Japan began a gradual transition of "going from pushover to potent rival".

=== Respectful rivalry ===
The formerly one-sided rivalry became closer in the period following Japan's upset penalty shoot-out win in the 2011 FIFA Women's World Cup final. Even while contesting three major tournament finals in four years, the teams' rivalry remained conspicuously respectful. In the immediate aftermath of the 2011 final, Carli Lloyd graciously congratulated the winners. While Aya Miyama delayed her participation in the celebrations to hug her defeated opponents.

Japan's 2011 captain Homare Sawa was particularly well disposed towards the United States as she had enjoyed several years living and playing professional football there. Sawa reflected the culture of the Japanese team, which has been described as "polite restraint" and contrasted with the more forthright culture of the American team. She had formed an enduring friendship with American centre-forward Abby Wambach when the two played together at Washington Freedom.

So while it's easier to get behind a rivalry rooted in bad blood and scores to settle, USA and Japan offers something else: A rematch and rivalry ferocious on the field, but also friendly. A match of disparate styles, but mutual admiration — and a mutual goal: the World Cup crown.

— Cory Collins, Sporting News

In March 2012 Japan secured their first ever win (within regulation time) against the United States, in Faro, Portugal at the 2012 Algarve Cup. Megumi Takase's headed 84th-minute goal secured a 1–0 victory and Japan's progression to the final. In April 2012 the United States travelled to play a friendly match in Japan, where they visited the area affected by the 2011 Tōhoku earthquake and tsunami and left gifts for local schoolchildren. Although the match was drawn, American players including Carli Lloyd and Heather O'Reilly conceded that the Japanese players had superior technique while the Americans relied on fitness and aggression.

== List of matches ==
#	Date	Venue	Competition	Result		
1	25 July 1986	(Italy) Jesolo	1986 Mundialito	United States	3–1	Japan
2	12 December 1987	(Taiwan) Taipei City	1987 Chunghua Cup	United States	1–0	Japan
3	1 June 1988	(China) Panyu	1988 International Women's Football Tournament	United States	5–2	Japan
4	21 November 1991	(China) Foshan	1991 FIFA Women's World Cup	Japan	0–3	United States
5	10 July 1993	(Canada) Hamilton	Friendly	United States	7–0	Japan
6	13 June 1995	(Sweden) Gävle	1995 FIFA Women's World Cup	United States	4–0	Japan
7	16 May 1996	(United States) Horsham	1996 U.S. Cup	United States	4–0	Japan
8	17 May 1998	(Japan) Tokyo	Friendly	Japan	1–2	United States
9	21 May 1998	(Japan) Kobe	Friendly	Japan	0–2	United States
10	24 May 1998	(Japan) Tokyo	Friendly	Japan	0–3	United States
11	29 April 1999	(United States) Charlotte	Friendly	United States	9–0	Japan
12	2 May 1999	(United States) Atlanta	Friendly	United States	7–0	Japan
13	7 June 2000	(Australia) Newcastle	Friendly	United States	4–1	Japan
14	17 December 2000	(United States) Phoenix	Friendly	United States	1–1	Japan
15	12 January 2003	(United States) San Diego	Friendly	United States	0–0	Japan
16	6 June 2004	(United States) Louisville	Friendly	United States	1–1	Japan
17	20 August 2004	(Greece) Thessaloniki	2004 Summer Olympics	United States	2–1	Japan
18	7 May 2006	(Japan) Kumamoto	Friendly	Japan	1–3	United States
19	9 May 2006	(Japan) Osaka	Friendly	Japan	0–1	United States
20	28 July 2007	(United States) San Jose	Friendly	United States	4–1	Japan
21	9 August 2008	(China) Qinhuangdao	2008 Summer Olympics	United States	1–0	Japan
22	18 August 2008	(China) Beijing	2008 Summer Olympics	United States	4–2	Japan
23	2 March 2011	(Portugal) Vila Real de Santo António	2011 Algarve Cup	United States	2–1	Japan
24	14 May 2011	(United States) Columbus	Friendly	United States	2–0	Japan
25	18 May 2011	(United States) Cary	Friendly	United States	2–0	Japan
26	17 July 2011	(Germany) Frankfurt	2011 FIFA Women's World Cup	United States	2–2 (Note: Japan won 3–1 on penalties.)	Japan
27	5 March 2012	(Portugal) Faro	2012 Algarve Cup	Japan	1–0	United States
28	1 April 2012	(Japan) Sendai	Friendly	Japan	1–1	United States
29	18 June 2012	(Sweden) Halmstad	Friendly	United States	4–1	Japan
30	9 August 2012	(United Kingdom) London	2012 Summer Olympics	United States	2–1	Japan
31	5 March 2014	(Portugal) Parchal	2014 Algarve Cup	Japan	1–1	United States
32	5 July 2015	(Canada) Vancouver	2015 FIFA Women's World Cup	United States	5–2	Japan
33	2 June 2016	(United States) Commerce City	Friendly	United States	3–3	Japan
34	5 June 2016	(United States) Cleveland	Friendly	United States	2–0	Japan
35	3 August 2017	(United States) Carson	2017 Tournament of Nations	United States	3–0	Japan
36	26 July 2018	(United States) Kansas City, Kansas	2018 Tournament of Nations	United States	4–2	Japan
37	27 February 2019	(United States) Chester	2019 SheBelieves Cup	United States	2–2	Japan
38	11 March 2020	(United States) Frisco	2020 SheBelieves Cup	United States	3–1	Japan
39	19 February 2023	(United States) Nashville	2023 SheBelieves Cup	United States	1–0	Japan
40	3 August 2024	(France) Paris	2024 Summer Olympics	United States	1–0	Japan
41	26 February 2025	(United States) San Diego	2025 SheBelieves Cup	United States	1–2	Japan
42	11 April 2026	(United States) San Jose	Friendly	United States	2–1	Japan
43	14 April 2026	(United States) Seattle	Friendly	United States	0–1	Japan

== Major tournaments ==
=== 1991 FIFA Women's World Cup ===
21 November 1991
15:30

Japan	0–3	United States
	(Report)	Akers-Stahl 20', 37'; Gebauer 39'

New Plaza Stadium, Foshan
Attendance: 14,000
Referee: John Toro Rendón (Colombia)

=== 1995 FIFA Women's World Cup ===
13 June 1995
17:15

United States	4–0	Japan
Lilly 8', 42'; Milbrett 45'; Venturini 80'	(Report)

Strömvallen, Gävle
Attendance: 3,756
Referee: Gamboa Martinez (Chile)

=== 2011 FIFA Women's World Cup ===
17 July 2011
20:45

Japan	2–2 (a.e.t.)	United States
Miyama 81'; Sawa 117'	Report	Morgan 69'; Wambach 104'
Penalties
Miyama (penalty scored); Nagasato (penalty missed); Sakaguchi (penalty scored); Kumagai (penalty scored)	3–1	(penalty missed) Boxx; (penalty missed) Lloyd; (penalty missed) Heath; (penalty scored) Wambach

Commerzbank-Arena, Frankfurt
Attendance: 48,817
Referee: Bibiana Steinhaus (Germany)

=== 2012 Summer Olympics ===
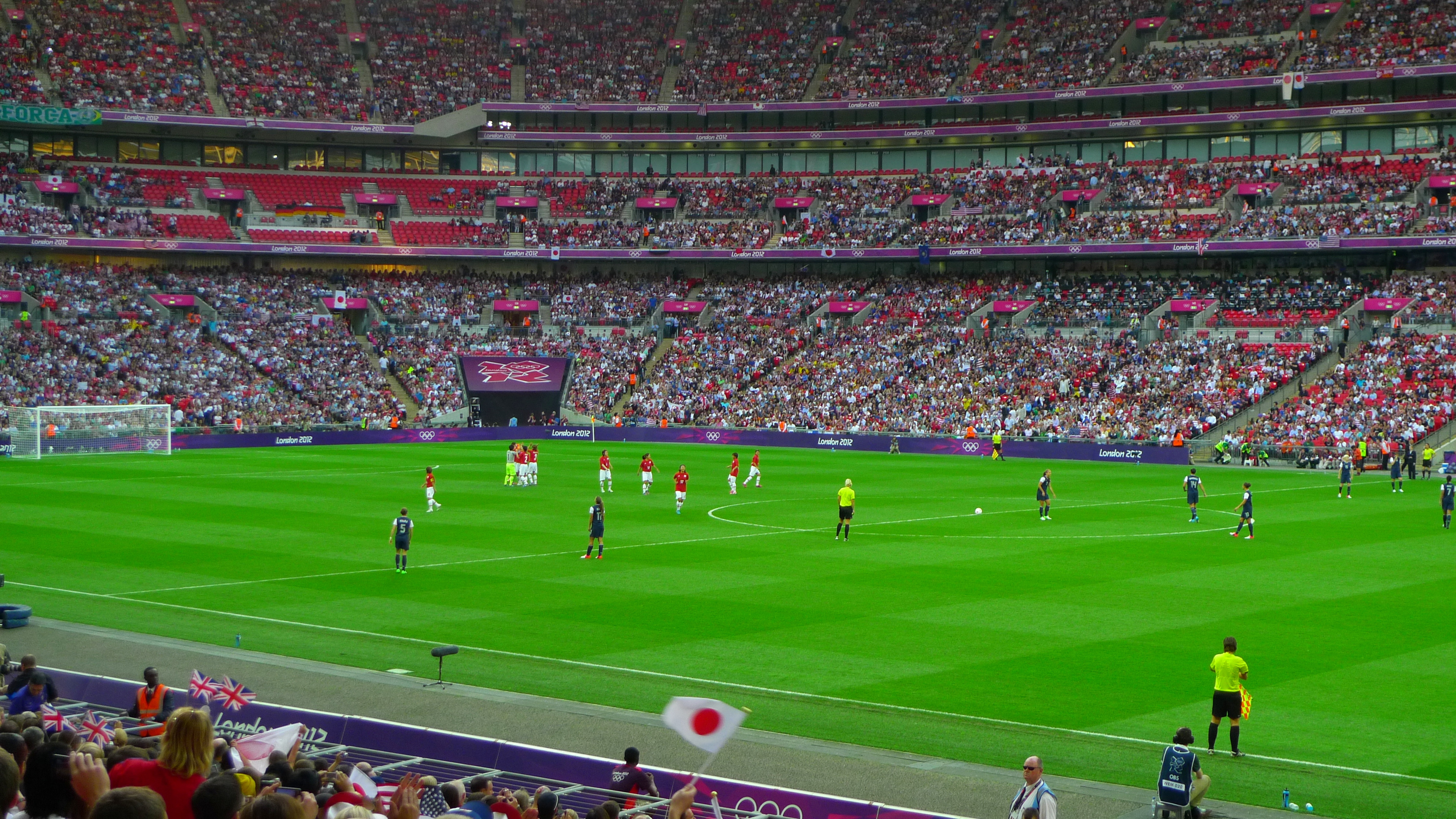
Japan–United States gold medal match at the 2012 Summer Olympics in London.

9 August 2012
19:45

(gold) United States	2–1	Japan (silver)
Lloyd 8', 54'	Report	Ōgimi 63'

Wembley Stadium, London
Attendance: 80,203
Referee: Bibiana Steinhaus (Germany)

=== 2015 FIFA Women's World Cup ===
5 July 2015
16:00 PDT (UTC−7)

United States	5–2	Japan
Lloyd 3', 5', 16'; Holiday 14'; Heath 54'	Report	Ōgimi 27'; Johnston 52' (o.g.)

BC Place, Vancouver
Attendance: 53,341
Referee: Kateryna Monzul (Ukraine)

=== 2024 Summer Olympics ===
3 August 2024
15:00

United States	1–0 (a.e.t.)	Japan
Rodman 105+2'	Report

Parc des Princes, Paris
Attendance: 43,004
Referee: Tess Olofsson (Sweden)

== Statistics ==
	Matches	Wins		Draws	Goals	
	Matches	USA	Japan	Draws	USA	Japan
FIFA Women's World Cup	4	3	0	1 (Note: Note: Japan defeated the United States at the 2011 FIFA Women's World Cup final via penalty shoot-out.)	14	4
Olympic Games	5	4	0	0	10	4
All major tournaments	8	7	0	1	23	8
Friendly	21	15	1	5	60	13
Algarve Cup	4	1	1	1	4	3
Tournament of Nations	2	2	0	0	7	2
International Women's Football Tournament	1	1	0	0	5	2
U.S. Cup	1	1	0	0	4	0
Mundialito	1	1	0	0	3	1
Chunghua Cup	1	1	0	0	1	0
SheBelieves Cup	3	1	1	1	6	5
Total	43	32	3	8	114	34

Matches held in Japan	6
Matches held in neutral venue	18
Matches held in the United States	19
Total matches	43

== See also ==
- Canada–United States sports rivalries#Soccer
- Japan–South Korea football rivalry
- Japan–United States relations
- Mexico–United States soccer rivalry#Women's football
- United States women's national soccer team results
