= United States women's national soccer team results =

The United States women's national soccer team was founded in 1985.

== 1985–1999 ==
=== 1985–1989 ===
1985–1989
Win Draw Defeat
| M | Opponent | Date | Result | Event |
| 1 | Italy | August 18, 1985 | 0–1 | (Italy) Mundialito |
| 2 | Denmark | August 21, 1985 | 2–2 | (Italy) Mundialito |
| 3 | England | August 23, 1985 | 1–3 | (Italy) Mundialito |
| 4 | Denmark | August 24, 1985 | 0–1 | (Italy) Mundialito |
| 5 | Canada | July 7, 1986 | 2–0 | (United States) Friendly |
| 6 | Canada | July 9, 1986 | 1–2 | (United States) Friendly |
| 7 | Canada | July 9, 1986 | 3–0 | (United States) Friendly |
| 8 | China | July 20, 1986 | 2–1 | (Italy) Mundialito |
| 9 | Brazil | July 22, 1986 | 2–1 | (Italy) Mundialito |
| 10 | Japan | July 25, 1986 | 3–1 | (Italy) Mundialito |
| 11 | Italy | July 26, 1986 | 0–1 | (Italy) Mundialito |
| 12 | Norway | July 5, 1987 | 3–0 | (United States) Friendly |
| 13 | Canada | July 7, 1987 | 4–2 | (United States) Friendly |
| 14 | Sweden | July 9, 1987 | 1–2 | (United States) Friendly |
| 15 | Norway | July 11, 1987 | 0–1 | (United States) Friendly |
| 16 | China | August 3, 1987 | 2–0 | (China) Friendly |
| 17 | China | August 13, 1987 | 1–1 | (China) Friendly |
| 18 | Japan | December 12, 1987 | 1–0 | (Taiwan) Women's World Invitational Tournament |
| 19 | New Zealand | December 15, 1987 | 0–1 | (Taiwan) Women's World Invitational Tournament |
| 20 | Australia | December 16, 1987 | 6–0 | (Taiwan) Women's World Invitational Tournament |
| 21 | Canada | December 19, 1987 | 4–0 | (Taiwan) Women's World Invitational Tournament |
| 22 | Chinese Taipei | December 20, 1987 | 1–2 | (Taiwan) Women's World Invitational Tournament |
| 23 | Japan | June 1, 1988 | 5–2 | (China) FIFA Women's Invitation Tournament |
| 24 | Sweden | June 3, 1988 | 1–1 | (China) FIFA Women's Invitation Tournament |
| 25 | Czechoslovakia | June 5, 1988 | 0–0 | (China) FIFA Women's Invitation Tournament |
| 26 | Norway | June 8, 1988 | 0–1 | (China) FIFA Women's Invitation Tournament Quarterfinal |
| 27 | West Germany | July 22, 1988 | 2–1 | (Italy) Mundialito |
| 28 | Italy | July 24, 1988 | 1–2 | (Italy) Mundialito |
| 29 | England | July 27, 1988 | 0–2 | (Italy) Mundialito |
| 30 | France | July 29, 1988 | 1–0 | (Italy) Mundialito |
| 31 | Poland | June 21, 1989 | 0–0 | (Italy) Friendly |

=== 1990–1999 ===
1990–1999
Win Draw Defeat
| M | Opponent | Date | Result | Event |
| 32 | Norway | July 25, 1990 | 4–0 | (Canada) Friendly |
| 33 | Canada | July 27, 1990 | 4–1 | Canada Cup |
| 34 | Norway | July 29, 1990 | 4–2 | Canada Cup |
| 35 | Soviet Union | August 5, 1990 | 8–0 | (United States) North America Cup |
| 36 | England | August 9, 1990 | 3–0 | (United States) North America Cup |
| 37 | West Germany | August 11, 1990 | 3–0 | (United States) North America Cup |
| 38 | Yugoslavia | April 1, 1991 | 8–0 | (Bulgaria) Grand Hotel Varna Tournament |
| 39 | Bulgaria | April 2, 1991 | 3–0 | (Bulgaria) Grand Hotel Varna Tournament |
| 40 | Hungary | April 3, 1991 | 3–0 | (Bulgaria) Grand Hotel Varna Tournament |
| 41 | France | April 5, 1991 | 2–0 | (Bulgaria) Grand Hotel Varna Tournament |
| 42 | Soviet Union | April 7, 1991 | 5–0 | (Bulgaria) Grand Hotel Varna Tournament |
| 43 | Mexico | April 18, 1991 | 12–0 | (Haiti) CONCACAF Championship |
| 44 | Martinique | April 20, 1991 | 12–0 | (Haiti) CONCACAF Championship |
| 45 | Trinidad and Tobago | April 22, 1991 | 10–0 | (Haiti) CONCACAF Championship |
| 46 | Haiti | April 25, 1991 | 10–0 | (Haiti) CONCACAF Championship SF |
| 47 | Canada | April 28, 1991 | 5–0 | (Haiti) CONCACAF Championship Final |
| 48 | France | May 18, 1991 | 4–0 | (France) Friendly |
| 49 | England | May 25, 1991 | 3–1 | (France) Friendly |
| 50 | Netherlands | May 28, 1991 | 3–4 | (Netherlands) Friendly |
| 51 | Germany | May 30, 1991 | 4–2 | (Germany) Friendly |
| 52 | Denmark | June 5, 1991 | 0–1 | (Denmark) Friendly |
| 53 | China | August 4, 1991 | 1–2 | (China) Friendly |
| 54 | China | August 8, 1991 | 2–2 | (China) Friendly |
| 55 | China | August 10, 1991 | 3–0 | (China) Friendly |
| 56 | Norway | August 30, 1991 | 0–1 | (United States) Friendly |
| 57 | Norway | September 1, 1991 | 1–2 | (United States) Friendly |
| 58 | China | October 4, 1991 | 1–2 | (United States) Friendly |
| 59 | China | October 12, 1991 | 2–0 | (United States) Friendly |
| 60 | Sweden | November 17, 1991 | 3–2 | (China) World Cup |
| 61 | Brazil | November 19, 1991 | 5–0 | (China) World Cup |
| 62 | Japan | November 21, 1991 | 3–0 | (China) World Cup |
| 63 | Chinese Taipei | November 24, 1991 | 7–0 | (China) World Cup QF |
| 64 | Germany | November 27, 1991 | 5–2 | (China) World Cup SF |
| 65 | Norway | November 30, 1991 | 2–1 | (China) World Cup F |
| 66 | Norway | August 14, 1992 | 1–3 | (United States) Friendly |
| 67 | Norway | August 16, 1992 | 2–4 | (United States) Friendly |
| 68 | Denmark | March 11, 1993 | 2–0 | Cyprus Tournament |
| 69 | Norway | March 12, 1993 | 0–1 | Cyprus Tournament |
| 70 | Germany | March 14, 1993 | 0–1 | Cyprus Tournament |
| 71 | Germany | April 7, 1993 | 1–2 | (United States) Friendly |
| 72 | Germany | April 10, 1993 | 3–0 | (United States) Friendly |
| 73 | Canada | June 12, 1993 | 7–0 | (United States) Columbus Cup |
| 74 | Italy | June 15, 1993 | 5–0 | (United States) Columbus Cup |
| 75 | Italy | June 19, 1993 | 1–0 | (United States) Columbus Cup |
| 76 | Canada | June 21, 1993 | 3–0 | (United States) Columbus Cup |
| 77 | Australia | July 7, 1993 | 6–0 | (Canada) Friendly |
| 78 | Japan | July 10, 1993 | 7–0 | (Canada) Friendly |
| 79 | Chinese Taipei | July 12, 1993 | 3–1 | (Canada) Friendly |
| 80 | Russia | July 14, 1993 | 2–0 | (Canada) Friendly |
| 81 | China | July 17, 1993 | 1–2 | (Canada) Friendly |
| 82 | New Zealand | August 4, 1993 | 3–0 | (United States) CONCACAF Championship |
| 83 | Trinidad and Tobago | August 6, 1993 | 9–0 | (United States) CONCACAF Championship |
| 84 | Canada | August 8, 1993 | 1–0 | (United States) CONCACAF Championship |
| 85 | Portugal | March 16, 1994 | 5–0 | (Portugal) Algarve Cup |
| 86 | Sweden | March 18, 1994 | 1–0 | (Portugal) Algarve Cup |
| 87 | Norway | March 20, 1994 | 0–1 | (Portugal) Algarve Cup Final |
| 88 | Trinidad and Tobago | April 10, 1994 | 3–1 | (Trinidad and Tobago) Tri-Nations Tournament |
| 89 | Canada | April 14, 1994 | 4–1 | (Trinidad and Tobago) Tri-Nations Tournament |
| 90 | Canada | April 17, 1994 | 3–0 | (Trinidad and Tobago) Tri-Nations Tournament |
| 91 | Germany | July 31, 1994 | 2–1 | (United States) Chiquita Cup |
| 92 | China | August 3, 1994 | 1–0 | (United States) Chiquita Cup |
| 93 | Norway | August 7, 1994 | 4–1 | (United States) Chiquita Cup |
| 94 | Mexico | August 13, 1994 | 9–0 | (Canada) CONCACAF Championship |
| 95 | Trinidad and Tobago | August 17, 1994 | 11–1 | (Canada) CONCACAF Championship |
| 96 | Jamaica | August 19, 1994 | 10–0 | (Canada) CONCACAF Championship |
| 97 | Canada | August 21, 1994 | 6–0 | (Canada) CONCACAF Championship |
| 98 | Denmark | February 24, 1995 | 7–0 | (United States) Friendly |
| 99 | Finland | March 14, 1995 | 2–0 | (Portugal) Algarve Cup |
| 100 | Portugal | March 16, 1995 | 3–0 | (Portugal) Algarve Cup |
| 101 | Denmark | March 17, 1995 | 0–2 | (Portugal) Algarve Cup |
| 102 | Norway | March 19, 1995 | 3(2)–3(4) | (Portugal) Algarve Cup |
| 103 | Italy | April 11, 1995 | 3–0 | (France) Tournoi International Feminin |
| 104 | Canada | April 12, 1995 | 5–0 | (France) Tournoi International Feminin |
| 105 | France | April 15, 1995 | 3–0 | (France) Tournoi International Feminin |
| 106 | Finland | April 28, 1995 | 2–0 | (United States) Friendly |
| 107 | Finland | April 30, 1995 | 6–0 | (United States) Friendly |
| 108 | Brazil | May 12, 1995 | 3–0 | (United States) Friendly |
| 109 | Brazil | May 14, 1995 | 4–1 | (United States) Friendly |
| 110 | Canada | May 19, 1995 | 9–1 | (United States) Friendly |
| 111 | Canada | May 22, 1995 | 2–1 | (United States) Friendly |
| 112 | China | June 6, 1995 | 3–3 | (Sweden) World Cup |
| 113 | Denmark | June 8, 1995 | 2–0 | (Sweden) World Cup |
| 114 | Australia | June 10, 1995 | 4–1 | (Sweden) World Cup |
| 115 | Japan | June 13, 1995 | 4–0 | (Sweden) World Cup QF |
| 116 | Norway | June 15, 1995 | 0–1 | (Sweden) World Cup SF |
| 117 | China | June 17, 1995 | 2–0 | (Sweden) World Cup 3rd Place |
| 118 | Chinese Taipei | July 30, 1995 | 9–0 | (United States) US Cup |
| 119 | Australia | August 3, 1995 | 4–2 | (United States) US Cup |
| 120 | Norway | August 6, 1995 | 2–1 | (United States) US Cup |
| 121 | Russia | January 14, 1996 | 8–1 | (Brazil) Torneio do Brasil |
| 122 | Brazil | January 16, 1996 | 3–2 | (Brazil) Torneio do Brasil |
| 123 | Ukraine | January 18, 1996 | 6–0 | (Brazil) Torneio do Brasil |
| 124 | Brazil | January 20, 1996 | 1(3)–1(2) | (Brazil) Torneio do Brasil |
| 125 | Norway | February 2, 1996 | 3–2 | (United States) Friendly |
| 126 | Norway | February 4, 1996 | 1–2 | (United States) Friendly |
| 127 | Denmark | February 10, 1996 | 2–1 | (United States) Friendly |
| 128 | Sweden | February 15, 1996 | 3–0 | (United States) Friendly |
| 129 | Sweden | February 17, 1996 | 3–0 | (United States) Friendly |
| 130 | Germany | March 14, 1996 | 6–0 | (United States) Friendly |
| 131 | Germany | March 16, 1996 | 2–0 | (United States) Friendly |
| 132 | Netherlands | April 20, 1996 | 6–0 | (United States) Friendly |
| 133 | France | April 26, 1996 | 4–1 | (United States) Friendly |
| 134 | France | April 28, 1996 | 8–2 | (United States) Friendly |
| 135 | Canada | May 12, 1996 | 6–0 | (United States) USA Cup |
| 136 | Japan | May 16, 1996 | 4–0 | (United States) USA Cup |
| 137 | China | May 18, 1996 | 1–0 | (United States) USA Cup |
| 138 | Australia | July 4, 1996 | 2–1 | (United States) Friendly |
| 139 | Australia | July 6, 1996 | 2–1 | (United States) Friendly |
| 140 | Denmark | July 21, 1996 | 3–0 | (United States) Olympics |
| 141 | Sweden | July 23, 1996 | 2–1 | (United States) Olympics |
| 142 | China | July 25, 1996 | 0–0 | (United States) Olympics |
| 143 | Norway | July 28, 1996 | 2–1 AET | (United States) Olympics SF |
| 144 | China | August 1, 1996 | 2–1 | (United States) Olympics F |
| 145 | Australia | February 28, 1997 | 4–0 | (Australia) Friendly |
| 146 | Australia | March 3, 1997 | 3–1 | (Australia) Friendly |
| 147 | Australia | March 5, 1997 | 3–0 | (Australia) Friendly |
| 148 | France | April 24, 1997 | 4–2 | (United States) Friendly |
| 149 | France | April 27, 1997 | 2–1 | (United States) Friendly |
| 150 | South Korea | May 2, 1997 | 7–0 | (United States) Friendly |
| 151 | South Korea | May 4, 1997 | 6–1 | (United States) Friendly |
| 152 | England | May 9, 1997 | 5–0 | (United States) Friendly |
| 153 | England | May 11, 1997 | 6–0 | (United States) Friendly |
| 154 | Canada | May 31, 1997 | 4–0 | (United States) USA Cup |
| 155 | Australia | June 5, 1997 | 9–1 | (United States) USA Cup |
| 156 | Italy | June 8, 1997 | 2–0 | (United States) USA Cup |
| 157 | Germany | October 9, 1997 | 1–3 | (Germany) Friendly |
| 158 | Germany | October 12, 1997 | 3–0 | (Germany) Friendly |
| 159 | Sweden | October 30, 1997 | 3–1 | (United States) Friendly |
| 160 | Sweden | November 1, 1997 | 3–1 | (United States) Friendly |
| 161 | Brazil | December 11, 1997 | 2–1 | (Brazil) Friendly |
| 162 | Brazil | December 13, 1997 | 0–1 | (Brazil) Friendly |
| 163 | Sweden | January 18, 1998 | 3–0 | (China) Four Nations Tournament |
| 164 | China | January 21, 1998 | 0–0 | (China) Four Nations Tournament |
| 165 | Norway | January 24, 1998 | 3–0 | (China) Four Nations Tournament |
| 166 | Finland | March 15, 1998 | 2–0 | (Portugal) Algarve Cup |
| 167 | China | March 17, 1998 | 4–1 | (Portugal) Algarve Cup |
| 168 | Norway | March 19, 1998 | 1–4 | (Portugal) Algarve Cup |
| 169 | Sweden | March 21, 1998 | 3–1 | (Portugal) Algarve Cup |
| 170 | Argentina | April 24, 1998 | 8–1 | (United States) Friendly |
| 171 | Argentina | April 26, 1998 | 7–0 | (United States) Friendly |
| 172 | Iceland | May 8, 1998 | 6–0 | (United States) Friendly |
| 173 | Iceland | May 10, 1998 | 1–0 | (United States) Friendly |
| 174 | Japan | May 17, 1998 | 2–1 | (Japan) Friendly |
| 175 | Japan | May 21, 1998 | 2–0 | (Japan) Friendly |
| 176 | Japan | May 24, 1998 | 3–0 | (Japan) Friendly |
| 177 | New Zealand | May 30, 1998 | 5–0 | (United States) Friendly |
| 178 | Germany | June 25, 1998 | 1–1 | (United States) Friendly |
| 179 | Germany | June 28, 1998 | 4–2 | (United States) Friendly |
| 180 | Denmark | July 25, 1998 | 5–0 | (United States) Goodwill Games SF |
| 181 | China | July 28, 1998 | 2–0 | (United States) Goodwill Games Final |
| 182 | Canada | August 2, 1998 | 4–0 | (United States) Friendly |
| 183 | Mexico | September 12, 1998 | 9–0 | (United States) USA Cup |
| 184 | Russia | September 18, 1998 | 4–0 | (United States) USA Cup |
| 185 | Brazil | September 20, 1998 | 3–0 | (United States) USA Cup |
| 186 | Ukraine | December 16, 1998 | 2–1 | (United States) Friendly |
| 187 | Ukraine | December 20, 1998 | 5–0 | (United States) Friendly |
| 188 | Portugal | January 27, 1999 | 7–0 | (United States) Friendly |
| 189 | Portugal | January 30, 1999 | 6–0 | (United States) Friendly |
| 190 | Finland | February 24, 1999 | 3–1 | (United States) Friendly |
| 191 | Finland | February 27, 1999 | 2–0 | (United States) Friendly |
| 192 | Sweden | March 14, 1999 | 1–1 | (Portugal) Algarve Cup |
| 193 | Finland | March 16, 1999 | 4–0 | (Portugal) Algarve Cup |
| 194 | Norway | March 18, 1999 | 2–1 | (Portugal) Algarve Cup |
| 195 | China | March 20, 1999 | 1–2 | (Portugal) Algarve Cup Final |
| 196 | Mexico | March 28, 1999 | 3–0 | (United States) Friendly |
| 197 | China | April 22, 1999 | 2–1 | (United States) Friendly |
| 198 | China | April 25, 1999 | 1–2 | (United States) Friendly |
| 199 | Japan | April 29, 1999 | 9–0 | (United States) Friendly |
| 200 | Japan | May 2, 1999 | 7–0 | (United States) Friendly |
| 201 | Netherlands | May 13, 1999 | 5–0 | (United States) Friendly |
| 202 | Netherlands | May 16, 1999 | 3–0 | (United States) Friendly |
| 203 | Brazil | May 22, 1999 | 3–0 | (United States) Friendly |
| 204 | Australia | June 3, 1999 | 4–0 | (United States) Friendly |
| 205 | Canada | June 6, 1999 | 4–2 | (United States) Friendly |
| 206 | Denmark | June 19, 1999 | 3–0 | (United States) World Cup |
| 207 | Nigeria | June 24, 1999 | 7–1 | (United States) World Cup |
| 208 | North Korea | June 27, 1999 | 3–0 | (United States) World Cup |
| 209 | Germany | July 1, 1999 | 3–2 | (United States) World Cup QF |
| 210 | Brazil | July 4, 1999 | 2–0 | (United States) World Cup SF |
| 211 | China | July 10, 1999 | 0(5)–0(4) | (United States) World Cup Final |
| 212 | Republic of Ireland | September 4, 1999 | 5–0 | (United States) Friendly |
| 213 | Brazil | September 26, 1999 | 6–0 | (United States) Friendly |
| 214 | South Korea | October 3, 1999 | 5–0 | (United States) Friendly |
| 215 | Finland | October 7, 1999 | 6–0 | (United States) Friendly |
| 216 | Brazil | October 10, 1999 | 4–2 | (United States) Friendly |

== 2000–2019 ==
=== 2000–2009 ===
2000–2009
Win Draw Defeat
| 217 | Czech Republic | January 7, 2000 | 8–1 | Australia Cup |
| 218 | Sweden | January 10, 2000 | 0–0 | Australia Cup |
| 219 | Australia | January 13, 2000 | 3–1 | Australia Cup |
| 220 | Norway | February 6, 2000 | 2–3 | (United States) Friendly |
| 221 | Norway | February 9, 2000 | 1–2 | (United States) Friendly |
| 222 | Portugal | March 12, 2000 | 7–0 | (Portugal) Algarve Cup |
| 223 | Denmark | March 14, 2000 | 2–1 | (Portugal) Algarve Cup |
| 224 | Sweden | March 16, 2000 | 1–0 | (Portugal) Algarve Cup |
| 225 | Norway | March 18, 2000 | 1–0 | (Portugal) Algarve Cup Final |
| 226 | Iceland | April 5, 2000 | 8–0 | (United States) Friendly |
| 227 | Iceland | April 8, 2000 | 0–0 | (United States) Friendly |
| 228 | Mexico | May 5, 2000 | 8–0 | (United States) Friendly |
| 229 | Canada | May 7, 2000 | 4–0 | (United States) Friendly |
| 230 | China | May 31, 2000 | 0–1 | (Australia) Pacific Cup |
| 231 | Canada | June 2, 2000 | 9–1 | (Australia) Pacific Cup |
| 232 | New Zealand | June 4, 2000 | 5–0 | (Australia) Pacific Cup |
| 233 | Japan | June 8, 2000 | 4–1 | (Australia) Pacific Cup |
| 234 | Australia | June 11, 2000 | 1–0 | (Australia) Pacific Cup |
| 235 | Trinidad and Tobago | June 23, 2000 | 11–0 | (United States) Gold Cup |
| 236 | Costa Rica | June 25, 2000 | 8–0 | (United States) Gold Cup |
| 237 | Brazil | June 27, 2000 | 0–0 | (United States) Gold Cup |
| 238 | Canada | July 1, 2000 | 4–1 | (United States) Gold Cup SF |
| 239 | Brazil | July 3, 2000 | 1–0 | (United States) Gold Cup F |
| 240 | Italy | July 7, 2000 | 4–1 | (United States) Friendly |
| 241 | Norway | July 16, 2000 | 1–0 | (Germany) Friendly |
| 242 | China | July 19, 2000 | 1–1 | (Germany) Friendly |
| 243 | Germany | July 22, 2000 | 1–0 | (Germany) Friendly |
| 244 | Norway | July 27, 2000 | 1–1 | (Norway) Friendly |
| 245 | Norway | July 30, 2000 | 1–2 | (Norway) Friendly |
| 246 | Russia | August 13, 2000 | 7–1 | (United States) Friendly |
| 247 | Russia | August 15, 2000 | 1–1 | (United States) Friendly |
| 248 | Canada | August 20, 2000 | 1–1 | (United States) Friendly |
| 249 | Brazil | September 1, 2000 | 4–0 | (United States) Friendly |
| 250 | Norway | September 14, 2000 | 2–0 | (Australia) Olympics |
| 251 | China | September 17, 2000 | 1–1 | (Australia) Olympics |
| 252 | Nigeria | September 20, 2000 | 3–1 | (Australia) Olympics |
| 253 | Brazil | September 24, 2000 | 1–0 | (Australia) Olympics SF |
| 254 | Norway | September 28, 2000 | 2–3 AET | (Australia) Olympics Final |
| 255 | Canada | November 11, 2000 | 1–3 | (United States) Friendly |
| 256 | Mexico | December 10, 2000 | 3–2 | (United States) Friendly |
| 257 | Japan | December 17, 2000 | 1–1 | (United States) Friendly |
| 258 | China | January 11, 2001 | 0–1 | (China) Friendly |
| 259 | China | January 14, 2001 | 1–1 | (China) Friendly |
| 260 | Italy | March 7, 2001 | 0–1 | (Italy) Friendly |
| 261 | Canada | March 11, 2001 | 0–3 | (Portugal) Algarve Cup |
| 262 | Portugal | March 13, 2001 | 2–0 | (Portugal) Algarve Cup |
| 263 | Sweden | March 15, 2001 | 0–2 | (Portugal) Algarve Cup |
| 264 | Norway | March 17, 2001 | 3–4 | (Portugal) Algarve Cup |
| 265 | Canada | June 30, 2001 | 2–2 | (Canada) Friendly |
| 266 | Canada | July 3, 2001 | 1–0 | (United States) Friendly |
| 267 | Germany | September 9, 2001 | 4–1 | (United States) Friendly |
| 268 | Mexico | January 12, 2002 | 7–0 | (United States) Friendly |
| 269 | Norway | January 23, 2002 | 0–1 | (China) Four Nations Tournament |
| 270 | Germany | January 25, 2002 | 0–0 | (China) Four Nations Tournament |
| 271 | China | January 27, 2002 | 2–0 | (China) Four Nations Tournament |
| 272 | Sweden | March 1, 2002 | 1–1 | (Portugal) Algarve Cup |
| 273 | England | March 3, 2002 | 2–0 | (Portugal) Algarve Cup |
| 274 | Norway | March 5, 2002 | 2–3 | (Portugal) Algarve Cup |
| 275 | Denmark | March 7, 2002 | 3–2 | (Portugal) Algarve Cup |
| 276 | Finland | April 27, 2002 | 2–0 | (United States) Friendly |
| 277 | Norway | July 21, 2002 | 4–0 | (United States) Friendly |
| 278 | Scotland | September 8, 2002 | 8–2 | (United States) Friendly |
| 279 | Russia | September 29, 2002 | 5–1 | (United States) Friendly |
| 280 | Australia | October 2, 2002 | 4–0 | (United States) Friendly |
| 281 | Italy | October 6, 2002 | 4–0 | (United States) Friendly |
| 282 | Mexico | October 27, 2002 | 3–0 | (United States) Gold Cup |
| 283 | Trinidad and Tobago | October 29, 2002 | 3–0 | (United States) Gold Cup |
| 284 | Panama | November 2, 2002 | 9–0 | (United States) Gold Cup |
| 285 | Costa Rica | November 6, 2002 | 7–0 | (United States) Gold Cup SF |
| 286 | Canada | November 9, 2002 | 2–1 | (United States) Gold Cup F |
| 287 | Japan | January 12, 2003 | 0–0 | (United States) Friendly |
| 288 | Norway | January 23, 2003 | 3–1 | (China) Four Nations Tournament |
| 289 | China | January 26, 2003 | 0–2 | (China) Four Nations Tournament |
| 290 | Germany | January 29, 2003 | 1–0 | (China) Four Nations Tournament |
| 291 | Iceland | February 16, 2003 | 1–0 | (United States) Friendly |
| 292 | Canada | March 14, 2003 | 1–1 | (Portugal) Algarve Cup |
| 293 | Norway | March 16, 2003 | 1–0 | (Portugal) Algarve Cup |
| 294 | Sweden | March 18, 2003 | 1–1 | (Portugal) Algarve Cup |
| 295 | China | March 20, 2003 | 2–0 | (Portugal) Algarve Cup |
| 296 | Canada | April 26, 2003 | 6–1 | (United States) Friendly |
| 297 | England | May 17, 2003 | 6–0 | (United States) Friendly |
| 298 | Republic of Ireland | June 14, 2003 | 5–0 | (United States) Friendly |
| 299 | Brazil | July 13, 2003 | 1–0 | (United States) Friendly |
| 300 | Costa Rica | September 1, 2003 | 5–0 | (United States) Friendly |
| 301 | Mexico | September 7, 2003 | 5–0 | (United States) Friendly |
| 302 | Sweden | September 21, 2003 | 3–1 | (United States) World Cup |
| 303 | Nigeria | September 25, 2003 | 5–0 | (United States) World Cup |
| 304 | North Korea | September 28, 2003 | 3–0 | (United States) World Cup |
| 305 | Norway | October 1, 2003 | 1–0 | (United States) World Cup QF |
| 306 | Germany | October 5, 2003 | 0–3 | (United States) World Cup SF |
| 307 | Canada | October 11, 2003 | 3–1 | (United States) World Cup 3rd |
| 308 | Italy | October 22, 2003 | 2–2 | (United States) Friendly |
| 309 | Mexico | November 3, 2003 | 3–1 | (United States) Friendly |
| 310 | Sweden | January 30, 2004 | 3–0 | (China) Four Nations Tournament |
| 311 | China | February 1, 2004 | 0–0 | (China) Four Nations Tournament |
| 312 | Canada | February 3, 2004 | 2–0 | (China) Four Nations Tournament |
| 313 | Trinidad and Tobago | February 25, 2004 | 7–0 | (Costa Rica) Olympic Qualifying |
| 314 | Haiti | February 27, 2004 | 8–0 | (Costa Rica) Olympic Qualifying |
| 315 | Mexico | February 29, 2004 | 2–0 | (Costa Rica) Olympic Qualifying |
| 316 | Costa Rica | March 3, 2004 | 4–0 | (Costa Rica) Olympic Qualifying |
| 317 | Mexico | March 5, 2004 | 3–2 | (Costa Rica) Olympic Qualifying |
| 318 | France | March 14, 2004 | 5–1 | (Portugal) Algarve Cup |
| 319 | Denmark | March 16, 2004 | 1–0 | (Portugal) Algarve Cup |
| 320 | Sweden | March 18, 2004 | 1–3 | (Portugal) Algarve Cup |
| 321 | Norway | March 20, 2004 | 4–1 | (Portugal) Algarve Cup Final |
| 322 | Brazil | April 24, 2004 | 5–1 | (United States) Friendly |
| 323 | Mexico | May 9, 2004 | 3–0 | (United States) Friendly |
| 324 | Japan | June 6, 2004 | 1–1 | (United States) Friendly |
| 325 | Canada | July 3, 2004 | 1–0 | (United States) Friendly |
| 326 | Australia | July 21, 2004 | 3–1 | (United States) Friendly |
| 327 | China | August 1, 2004 | 3–1 | (United States) Friendly |
| 328 | Greece | August 11, 2004 | 3–0 | (Greece) Olympics |
| 329 | Brazil | August 14, 2004 | 2–0 | (Greece) Olympics |
| 330 | Australia | August 17, 2004 | 1–1 | (Greece) Olympics |
| 331 | Japan | August 20, 2004 | 2–1 | (Greece) Olympics QF |
| 332 | Germany | August 23, 2004 | 2–1 AET | (Greece) Olympics SF |
| 333 | Brazil | August 26, 2004 | 2–1 AET | (Greece) Olympics F |
| 334 | Iceland | September 25, 2004 | 4–3 | (United States) Friendly |
| 335 | Iceland | September 29, 2004 | 3–0 | (United States) Friendly |
| 336 | New Zealand | October 3, 2004 | 5–0 | (United States) Friendly |
| 337 | New Zealand | October 10, 2004 | 6–0 | (United States) Friendly |
| 338 | Mexico | October 16, 2004 | 1–0 | (United States) Friendly |
| 339 | Republic of Ireland | October 20, 2004 | 5–1 | (United States) Friendly |
| 340 | Republic of Ireland | October 23, 2004 | 5–0 | (United States) Friendly |
| 341 | Denmark | November 3, 2004 | 1–1 | (United States) Friendly |
| 342 | Denmark | November 6, 2004 | 1–3 | (United States) Friendly |
| 343 | Mexico | December 8, 2004 | 5–0 | (United States) Friendly |
| 344 | France | March 9, 2005 | 1–0 | (Portugal) Algarve Cup |
| 345 | Finland | March 11, 2005 | 3–0 | (Portugal) Algarve Cup |
| 346 | Denmark | March 13, 2005 | 4–0 | (Portugal) Algarve Cup |
| 347 | Germany | March 15, 2005 | 1–0 | (Portugal) Algarve Cup Final |
| 348 | Canada | June 28, 2005 | 2–0 | (United States) Friendly |
| 349 | Ukraine | July 10, 2005 | 7–0 | (United States) Friendly |
| 350 | Iceland | July 24, 2005 | 3–0 | (United States) Friendly |
| 351 | Australia | October 16, 2005 | 0–0 | (United States) Friendly |
| 352 | Mexico | October 23, 2005 | 3–0 | (United States) Friendly |
| 353 | Norway | January 18, 2006 | 3–1 | (China) Four Nations Tournament |
| 354 | France | January 20, 2006 | 0–0 | (China) Four Nations Tournament |
| 355 | China | January 22, 2006 | 2–0 | (China) Four Nations Tournament |
| 356 | China | March 9, 2006 | 0–0 | (Portugal) Algarve Cup |
| 357 | Denmark | March 11, 2006 | 5–0 | (Portugal) Algarve Cup |
| 358 | France | March 13, 2006 | 4–1 | (Portugal) Algarve Cup |
| 359 | Germany | March 15, 2006 | 0(3)-0(4) | (Portugal) Algarve Cup |
| 360 | Japan | May 7, 2006 | 3–1 | (Japan) Friendly |
| 361 | Japan | May 9, 2006 | 1–0 | (Japan) Friendly |
| 362 | Sweden | July 1, 2006 | 3–2 | (United States) Friendly |
| 363 | Republic of Ireland | July 23, 2006 | 5–0 | (United States) Friendly |
| 364 | Canada | July 30, 2006 | 2–0 | (United States) Friendly |
| 365 | China | August 27, 2006 | 4–1 | (United States) Friendly |
| 366 | Mexico | September 13, 2006 | 3–1 | (United States) Friendly |
| 367 | Chinese Taipei | October 1, 2006 | 10–0 | (United States) Friendly |
| 368 | Iceland | October 8, 2006 | 2–1 | (United States) Friendly |
| 369 | Denmark | October 29, 2006 | 1–1 | (South Korea) Peace Queen Cup |
| 370 | Australia | October 31, 2006 | 2–0 | (South Korea) Peace Queen Cup |
| 371 | Netherlands | November 2, 2006 | 2–0 | (South Korea) Peace Queen Cup |
| 372 | Canada | November 4, 2006 | 1–0 | (South Korea) Peace Queen Cup Final |
| 373 | Mexico | November 22, 2006 | 2–0 | (United States) Gold Cup SF |
| 374 | Canada | November 26, 2006 | 2–1 AET | (United States) Gold Cup F |
| 375 | Germany | January 26, 2007 | 0–0 | (China) Four Nations Tournament |
| 376 | England | January 28, 2007 | 1–1 | (China) Four Nations Tournament |
| 377 | China | January 30, 2007 | 2–0 | (China) Four Nations Tournament |
| 378 | China | March 7, 2007 | 2–1 | (Portugal) Algarve Cup |
| 379 | Finland | March 9, 2007 | 1–0 | (Portugal) Algarve Cup |
| 380 | Sweden | March 12, 2007 | 3–2 | (Portugal) Algarve Cup |
| 381 | Denmark | March 14, 2007 | 2–0 | (Portugal) Algarve Cup Final |
| 382 | Mexico | April 14, 2007 | 5–0 | (United States) Friendly |
| 383 | Canada | May 12, 2007 | 6–2 | (United States) Friendly |
| 384 | China | June 16, 2007 | 2–0 | (United States) Friendly |
| 385 | Brazil | June 23, 2007 | 2–0 | (United States) Friendly |
| 386 | Norway | July 14, 2007 | 1–0 | (United States) Friendly |
| 387 | Japan | July 28, 2007 | 4–1 | (United States) Friendly |
| 388 | New Zealand | August 12, 2007 | 6–1 | (United States) Friendly |
| 389 | Finland | August 25, 2007 | 4–0 | (United States) Friendly |
| 390 | North Korea | September 11, 2007 | 2–2 | (China) World Cup |
| 391 | Sweden | September 14, 2007 | 2–0 | (China) World Cup |
| 392 | Nigeria | September 18, 2007 | 1–0 | (China) World Cup |
| 393 | England | September 22, 2007 | 3–0 | (China) World Cup QF |
| 394 | Brazil | September 27, 2007 | 0–4 | (China) World Cup SF |
| 395 | Norway | September 30, 2007 | 4–1 | (China) World Cup 3rd Place Match |
| 396 | Mexico | October 13, 2007 | 5–1 | (United States) Friendly |
| 397 | Mexico | October 17, 2007 | 4–0 | (United States) Friendly |
| 398 | Mexico | October 20, 2007 | 1–1 | (United States) Friendly |
| 399 | Canada | January 16, 2008 | 4–0 | (China) Four Nations Tournament |
| 400 | Finland | January 18, 2008 | 4–1 | (China) Four Nations Tournament |
| 401 | China | January 20, 2008 | 1–0 | (China) Four Nations Tournament |
| 402 | China | March 5, 2008 | 4–0 | (Portugal) Algarve Cup |
| 403 | Italy | March 7, 2008 | 2–0 | (Portugal) Algarve Cup |
| 404 | Norway | March 10, 2008 | 4–0 | (Portugal) Algarve Cup |
| 405 | Denmark | March 12, 2008 | 2–1 | (Portugal) Algarve Cup |
| 406 | Jamaica | April 4, 2008 | 6–0 | (Mexico) Olympic Qualifying |
| 407 | Mexico | April 6, 2008 | 3–1 | (Mexico) Olympic Qualifying |
| 408 | Costa Rica | April 9, 2008 | 3–0 | (Mexico) Olympic Qualifying |
| 409 | Canada | April 12, 2008 | 1(6)–1(5) | (Mexico) Olympic Qualifying |
| 410 | Australia | April 27, 2008 | 3–2 | (United States) Friendly |
| 411 | Australia | May 3, 2008 | 5–4 | (United States) Friendly |
| 412 | Canada | May 10, 2008 | 6–0 | (United States) Friendly |
| 413 | Australia | June 15, 2008 | 2–1 | (South Korea) Peace Queen Cup |
| 414 | Brazil | June 17, 2008 | 1–0 | (South Korea) Peace Queen Cup |
| 415 | Italy | June 19, 2008 | 2–0 | (South Korea) Peace Queen Cup |
| 416 | Canada | June 21, 2008 | 1–0 | (South Korea) Peace Queen Cup Final |
| 417 | Norway | July 2, 2008 | 4–0 | (Norway) Friendly |
| 418 | Sweden | July 5, 2008 | 1–0 | (Sweden) Friendly |
| 419 | Brazil | July 13, 2008 | 1–0 | (United States) Friendly |
| 420 | Brazil | July 16, 2008 | 1–0 | (United States) Friendly |
| 421 | Norway | August 6, 2008 | 0–2 | (China) Olympics |
| 422 | Japan | August 9, 2008 | 1–0 | (China) Olympics |
| 423 | New Zealand | August 12, 2008 | 4–0 | (China) Olympics |
| 424 | Canada | August 15, 2008 | 2–1 | (China) Olympics QF |
| 425 | Japan | August 18, 2008 | 4–2 | (China) Olympics SF |
| 426 | Brazil | August 21, 2008 | 1–0 | (China) Olympics F |
| 427 | Republic of Ireland | September 13, 2008 | 2–0 | (United States) Friendly |
| 428 | Republic of Ireland | September 17, 2008 | 1–0 | (United States) Friendly |
| 429 | Republic of Ireland | September 20, 2008 | 2–0 | (United States) Friendly |
| 430 | South Korea | November 1, 2008 | 0–0 | (United States) Friendly |
| 431 | South Korea | November 5, 2008 | 1–0 | (United States) Friendly |
| 432 | South Korea | November 8, 2008 | 1–0 | (United States) Friendly |
| 433 | China | December 13, 2008 | 1–0 | (United States) Friendly |
| 434 | China | December 17, 2008 | 1–0 | (United States) Friendly |
| 435 | Denmark | March 4, 2009 | 2–0 | (Portugal) Algarve Cup |
| 436 | Iceland | March 6, 2009 | 1–0 | (Portugal) Algarve Cup |
| 437 | Norway | March 9, 2009 | 1–0 | (Portugal) Algarve Cup |
| 438 | Sweden | March 11, 2009 | 1(3)–1(4) | (Portugal) Algarve Cup |
| 439 | Canada | May 25, 2009 | 4–0 | (Canada) Friendly |
| 440 | Canada | July 19, 2009 | 1–0 | (United States) Friendly |
| 441 | Canada | July 22, 2009 | 1–0 | (United States) Friendly |
| 442 | Germany | October 29, 2009 | 1–0 | (Germany) Friendly |

=== 2010–2019 ===
2010–2019
Win Draw Defeat
| 443 | Iceland | February 24, 2010 | 2–0 | (Portugal) Algarve Cup |
| 444 | Norway | February 26, 2010 | 2–1 | (Portugal) Algarve Cup |
| 445 | Sweden | March 1, 2010 | 2–0 | (Portugal) Algarve Cup |
| 446 | Germany | March 3, 2010 | 3–2 | (Portugal) Algarve Cup Final |
| 447 | Mexico | March 28, 2010 | 3–0 | (United States) Friendly |
| 448 | Mexico | March 31, 2010 | 1–0 | (United States) Friendly |
| 449 | Germany | May 22, 2010 | 4–0 | (United States) Friendly |
| 450 | Sweden | June 13, 2010 | 1–1 | (United States) Friendly |
| 451 | Sweden | June 17, 2010 | 3–0 | (United States) Friendly |
| 452 | China | October 2, 2010 | 2–1 | (United States) Friendly |
| 453 | China | October 6, 2010 | 1–1 | (United States) Friendly |
| 454 | Haiti | October 28, 2010 | 5–0 | (Mexico) World Cup Qualifying |
| 455 | Guatemala | October 30, 2010 | 9–0 | (Mexico) World Cup Qualifying |
| 456 | Costa Rica | November 1, 2010 | 4–0 | (Mexico) World Cup Qualifying |
| 457 | Mexico | November 5, 2010 | 1–2 | (Mexico) World Cup Qualifying SF |
| 458 | Costa Rica | November 8, 2010 | 0–3 | (Mexico) World Cup Qualifying 3rd |
| 459 | Italy | November 20, 2010 | 1–0 | (Italy) World Cup Qualifying Playoff |
| 460 | Italy | November 27, 2010 | 1–0 | (United States) World Cup Qualifying Playoff |
| 461 | Sweden | January 21, 2011 | 1–2 | (China) Four Nations Tournament |
| 462 | Canada | January 23, 2011 | 2–1 | (China) Four Nations Tournament |
| 463 | China | January 25, 2011 | 2–0 | (China) Four Nations Tournament |
| 464 | Japan | March 2, 2011 | 2–1 | (Portugal) Algarve Cup |
| 465 | Norway | March 4, 2011 | 2–0 | (Portugal) Algarve Cup |
| 466 | Finland | March 7, 2011 | 4–0 | (Portugal) Algarve Cup |
| 467 | Iceland | March 9, 2011 | 4–2 | (Portugal) Algarve Cup Final |
| 468 | England | April 2, 2011 | 1–2 | (England) Friendly |
| 469 | Japan | May 14, 2011 | 2–0 | (United States) Friendly |
| 470 | Japan | May 18, 2011 | 2–0 | (United States) Friendly |
| 471 | Mexico | June 5, 2011 | 1–0 | (United States) Friendly |
| 472 | North Korea | June 28, 2011 | 2–0 | (Germany) World Cup |
| 473 | Colombia | July 2, 2011 | 3–0 | (Germany) World Cup |
| 474 | Sweden | July 6, 2011 | 1–2 | (Germany) World Cup |
| 475 | Brazil | July 10, 2011 | 2(5)–2(3) | (Germany) World Cup QF |
| 476 | France | July 13, 2011 | 3–1 | (Germany) World Cup SF |
| 477 | Japan | July 17, 2011 | 2(1)–2(3) | (Germany) World Cup F |
| 478 | Canada | September 17, 2011 | 1–1 | (United States) Friendly |
| 479 | Canada | September 22, 2011 | 3–0 | (United States) Friendly |
| 480 | Sweden | November 19, 2011 | 1–1 | (Sweden) Friendly |
| 481 | Dominican Republic | January 20, 2012 | 14–0 | (Canada) Olympic Qualifying |
| 482 | Guatemala | January 22, 2012 | 13–0 | (Canada) Olympic Qualifying |
| 483 | Mexico | January 24, 2012 | 4–0 | (Canada) Olympic Qualifying |
| 484 | Costa Rica | January 27, 2012 | 3–0 | (Canada) Olympic Qualifying SF |
| 485 | Canada | January 29, 2012 | 4–0 | (Canada) Olympic Qualifying F |
| 486 | New Zealand | February 11, 2012 | 2–1 | (United States) Friendly |
| 487 | Denmark | February 29, 2012 | 5–0 | (Portugal) Algarve Cup |
| 488 | Norway | March 2, 2012 | 2–1 | (Portugal) Algarve Cup |
| 489 | Japan | March 5, 2012 | 0–1 | (Portugal) Algarve Cup |
| 490 | Sweden | March 7, 2012 | 4–0 | (Portugal) Algarve Cup |
| 491 | Japan | April 1, 2012 | 1–1 | (Japan) Kirin Challenge Cup |
| 492 | Brazil | April 3, 2012 | 3–0 | (Japan) Kirin Challenge Cup |
| 493 | China | May 27, 2012 | 4–1 | (United States) Friendly |
| 494 | Sweden | June 16, 2012 | 3–1 | Sweden Invitational |
| 495 | Japan | June 18, 2012 | 4–1 | Sweden Invitational |
| 496 | Canada | June 30, 2012 | 2–1 | (United States) Friendly |
| 497 | France | July 25, 2012 | 4–2 | (United Kingdom) Olympics |
| 498 | Colombia | July 28, 2012 | 3–0 | (United Kingdom) Olympics |
| 499 | North Korea | July 31, 2012 | 1–0 | (United Kingdom) Olympics |
| 500 | New Zealand | August 3, 2012 | 2–0 | (United Kingdom) Olympics QF |
| 501 | Canada | August 6, 2012 | 4–3 AET | (United Kingdom) Olympics SF |
| 502 | Japan | August 9, 2012 | 2–1 | (United Kingdom) Olympics F |
| 503 | Costa Rica | September 1, 2012 | 8–0 | (United States) Friendly |
| 504 | New Zealand | September 16, 2012 | 2–1 | (United States) Friendly |
| 505 | New Zealand | September 19, 2012 | 6–2 | (United States) Friendly |
| 506 | Germany | OCtober 20, 2012 | 1–1 | (United States) Friendly |
| 507 | Germany | October 23, 2012 | 2–2 | (United States) Friendly |
| 508 | Republic of Ireland | November 28, 2012 | 5–0 | (United States) Friendly |
| 509 | Republic of Ireland | December 1, 2012 | 2–0 | (United States) Friendly |
| 510 | China | December 8, 2012 | 2–0 | (United States) Friendly |
| 511 | China | December 12, 2012 | 4–0 | (United States) Friendly |
| 512 | China | December 15, 2012 | 4–1 | (United States) Friendly |
| 513 | Scotland | February 9, 2013 | 4–1 | (United States) Friendly |
| 514 | Scotland | February 13, 2013 | 3–1 | (United States) Friendly |
| 515 | Iceland | March 6, 2013 | 3–0 | (Portugal) Algarve Cup |
| 516 | China | March 8, 2013 | 5–0 | (Portugal) Algarve Cup |
| 517 | Sweden | March 11, 2013 | 1–1 | (Portugal) Algarve Cup |
| 518 | Germany | March 13, 2013 | 2–0 | (Portugal) Algarve Cup F |
| 519 | Germany | April 5, 2013 | 3–3 | (Germany) Friendly |
| 520 | Netherlands | April 9, 2013 | 3–1 | (Netherlands) Friendly |
| 521 | Canada | June 2, 2013 | 3–0 | (Canada) Friendly |
| 522 | South Korea | June 15, 2013 | 4–1 | (United States) Friendly |
| 523 | South Korea | June 20, 2013 | 5–0 | (United States) Friendly |
| 524 | Mexico | September 3, 2013 | 7–0 | (United States) Friendly |
| 525 | Australia | October 20, 2013 | 4–0 | (United States) Friendly |
| 526 | New Zealand | October 27, 2013 | 4–0 | (United States) Friendly |
| 527 | New Zealand | October 30, 2013 | 1–1 | (United States) Friendly |
| 528 | Brazil | November 10, 2013 | 4–1 | (United States) Friendly |
| 529 | Canada | January 31, 2014 | 1–0 | (United States) Friendly |
| 530 | Russia | February 8, 2014 | 7–0 | (United States) Friendly |
| 531 | Russia | February 13, 2014 | 8–0 | (United States) Friendly |
| 532 | Japan | March 5, 2014 | 1–1 | (Portugal) Algarve Cup |
| 533 | Sweden | March 7, 2014 | 0–1 | (Portugal) Algarve Cup |
| 534 | Denmark | March 10, 2014 | 3–5 | (Portugal) Algarve Cup |
| 535 | North Korea | March 12, 2014 | 3–0 | (Portugal) Algarve Cup |
| 536 | China | April 6, 2014 | 2–0 | (United States) Friendly |
| 537 | China | April 10, 2014 | 3–0 | (United States) Friendly |
| 538 | Canada | May 8, 2014 | 1–1 | (Canada) Friendly |
| 539 | France | June 14, 2014 | 1–0 | (United States) Friendly |
| 540 | France | June 19, 2014 | 2–2 | (United States) Friendly |
| 541 | Switzerland | August 20, 2014 | 4–1 | (United States) Friendly |
| 542 | Mexico | September 13, 2014 | 8–0 | (United States) Friendly |
| 543 | Mexico | September 18, 2014 | 4–0 | (United States) Friendly |
| 544 | Trinidad and Tobago | October 15, 2014 | 1–0 | (United States) Concacaf Championship |
| 545 | Guatemala | October 17, 2014 | 5–0 | (United States) Concacaf Championship |
| 546 | Haiti | October 20, 2014 | 6–0 | (United States) Concacaf Championship |
| 547 | Mexico | October 24, 2014 | 3–0 | (United States) Concacaf Championship SF |
| 548 | Costa Rica | October 26, 2014 | 6–0 | (United States) Concacaf Championship F |
| 549 | China | December 10, 2014 | 1–1 | (Brazil) Brasilia Tournament |
| 550 | Brazil | December 14, 2014 | 2–3 | (Brazil) Brasilia Tournament |
| 551 | Argentina | December 18, 2014 | 7–0 | (Brazil) Brasilia Tournament |
| 552 | Brazil | December 21, 2014 | 0–0 | (Brazil) Brasilia Tournament |
| 553 | France | February 8, 2015 | 0–2 | (France) Friendly |
| 554 | England | February 13, 2015 | 1–0 | (England) Friendly |
| 555 | Norway | March 4, 2015 | 2–1 | (Portugal) Algarve Cup |
| 556 | Switzerland | March 6, 2015 | 3–0 | (Portugal) Algarve Cup |
| 557 | Iceland | March 9, 2015 | 0–0 | (Portugal) Algarve Cup |
| 558 | France | March 11, 2015 | 2–0 | (Portugal) Algarve Cup Final |
| 559 | New Zealand | April 4, 2015 | 4–0 | (United States) Friendly |
| 560 | Republic of Ireland | May 10, 2015 | 3–0 | (United States) Friendly |
| 561 | Mexico | May 17, 2015 | 5–1 | (United States) Friendly |
| 562 | South Korea | May 30, 2015 | 0–0 | (United States) Friendly |
| 563 | Australia | June 8, 2015 | 3–1 | (Canada) World Cup |
| 564 | Sweden | June 12, 2015 | 0–0 | (Canada) World Cup |
| 565 | Nigeria | June 16, 2015 | 1–0 | (Canada) World Cup |
| 566 | Colombia | June 22, 2015 | 2–0 | (Canada) World Cup R16 |
| 567 | China | June 26, 2015 | 1–0 | (Canada) World Cup QF |
| 568 | Germany | June 30, 2015 | 2–0 | (Canada) World Cup SF |
| 569 | Japan | July 5, 2015 | 5–2 | (Canada) World Cup F |
| 570 | Costa Rica | August 16, 2015 | 8–0 | (United States) Friendly |
| 571 | Costa Rica | August 19, 2015 | 7–2 | (United States) Friendly |
| 572 | Haiti | September 17, 2015 | 5–0 | (United States) Friendly |
| 573 | Haiti | September 20, 2015 | 8–0 | (United States) Friendly |
| 574 | Brazil | October 21, 2015 | 1–1 | (United States) Friendly |
| 575 | Brazil | October 25, 2015 | 3–1 | (United States) Friendly |
| 576 | Trinidad and Tobago | December 10, 2015 | 6–0 | (United States) Friendly |
| 577 | China | December 13, 2015 | 2–0 | (United States) Friendly |
| 578 | China | December 16, 2015 | 0–1 | (United States) Friendly |
| 579 | Republic of Ireland | January 23, 2016 | 5–0 | (United States) Friendly |
| 580 | Costa Rica | February 10, 2016 | 5–0 | (United States) Olympic Qualifying |
| 581 | Mexico | February 13, 2016 | 1–0 | (United States) Olympic Qualifying |
| 582 | Puerto Rico | February 15, 2016 | 10–0 | (United States) Olympic Qualifying |
| 583 | Trinidad and Tobago | February 19, 2016 | 5–0 | (United States) Olympic Qualifying SF |
| 584 | Canada | February 21, 2016 | 2–0 | (United States) Olympic Qualifying F |
| 585 | England | March 3, 2016 | 1–0 | (United States) SheBelieves Cup |
| 586 | France | March 6, 2016 | 1–0 | (United States) SheBelieves Cup |
| 587 | Germany | March 9, 2016 | 2–1 | (United States) SheBelieves Cup |
| 588 | Colombia | April 6, 2016 | 7–0 | (United States) Friendly |
| 589 | Colombia | April 10, 2016 | 3–0 | (United States) Friendly |
| 590 | Japan | June 2, 2016 | 3–3 | (United States) Friendly |
| 591 | Japan | June 5, 2016 | 2–0 | (United States) Friendly |
| 592 | South Africa | July 9, 2016 | 1–0 | (United States) Friendly |
| 593 | Costa Rica | July 22, 2016 | 4–0 | (United States) Friendly |
| 594 | New Zealand | August 3, 2016 | 2–0 | (Brazil) Olympics |
| 595 | France | August 6, 2016 | 1–0 | (Brazil) Olympics |
| 596 | Colombia | August 9, 2016 | 2–2 | (Brazil) Olympics |
| 597 | Sweden | August 12, 2016 | 1(3)–1(4) | (Brazil) Olympics QF |
| 598 | Thailand | September 15, 2016 | 9–0 | (United States) Friendly |
| 599 | Netherlands | September 18, 2016 | 3–1 | (United States) Friendly |
| 600 | Switzerland | October 19, 2016 | 4–0 | (United States) Friendly |
| 601 | Switzerland | October 23, 2016 | 5–1 | (United States) Friendly |
| 602 | Romania | November 10, 2016 | 8–1 | (United States) Friendly |
| 603 | Romania | November 13, 2016 | 5–0 | (United States) Friendly |
| 604 | Germany | March 1, 2017 | 1–0 | (United States) SheBelieves Cup |
| 605 | England | March 4, 2017 | 0–1 | (United States) SheBelieves Cup |
| 606 | France | March 7, 2017 | 0–3 | (United States) SheBelieves Cup |
| 607 | Russia | April 6, 2017 | 4–0 | (United States) Friendly |
| 608 | Russia | April 9, 2017 | 5–1 | (United States) Friendly |
| 609 | Sweden | June 8, 2017 | 1–0 | (Sweden) Friendly |
| 610 | Norway | June 11, 2017 | 1–0 | (Norway) Friendly |
| 611 | Australia | July 27, 2017 | 0–1 | (United States) Tournament of Nations |
| 612 | Brazil | July 30, 2017 | 4–3 | (United States) Tournament of Nations |
| 613 | Japan | August 3, 2017 | 3–0 | (United States) Tournament of Nations |
| 614 | New Zealand | September 15, 2017 | 3–1 | (United States) Friendly |
| 615 | New Zealand | September 19, 2017 | 5–0 | (United States) Friendly |
| 616 | South Korea | October 19, 2017 | 3–1 | (United States) Friendly |
| 617 | South Korea | October 22, 2017 | 6–0 | (United States) Friendly |
| 618 | Canada | November 9, 2017 | 1–1 | (Canada) Friendly |
| 619 | Canada | November 12, 2017 | 3–1 | (United States) Friendly |
| 620 | Denmark | January 21, 2018 | 5–1 | (United States) Friendly |
| 621 | Germany | March 1, 2018 | 1–0 | (United States) SheBelieves Cup |
| 622 | France | March 4, 2018 | 1–1 | (United States) SheBelieves Cup |
| 623 | England | March 7, 2018 | 1–0 | (United States) SheBelieves Cup |
| 624 | Mexico | April 5, 2018 | 4–1 | (United States) Friendly |
| 625 | Mexico | April 8, 2018 | 6–2 | (United States) Friendly |
| 626 | China | June 7, 2018 | 1–0 | (United States) Friendly |
| 627 | China | June 12, 2018 | 2–1 | (United States) Friendly |
| 628 | Japan | July 26, 2018 | 4–2 | (United States) Tournament of Nations |
| 629 | Australia | July 29, 2018 | 1–1 | (United States) Tournament of Nations |
| 630 | Brazil | August 2, 2018 | 4–1 | (United States) Tournament of Nations |
| 631 | Chile | August 31, 2018 | 3–0 | (United States) Friendly |
| 632 | Chile | September 4, 2018 | 4–0 | (United States) Friendly |
| 633 | Mexico | October 4, 2018 | 6–0 | (United States) Concacaf Championship |
| 634 | Panama | October 7, 2018 | 5–0 | (United States) Concacaf Championship |
| 635 | Trinidad and Tobago | October 10, 2018 | 7–0 | (United States) Concacaf Championship |
| 636 | Jamaica | October 14, 2018 | 6–0 | (United States) Concacaf Championship |
| 637 | Canada | October 17, 2018 | 2–0 | (United States) Concacaf Championship Final |
| 638 | Portugal | November 8, 2018 | 1–0 | (Portugal) Friendly |
| 639 | Scotland | November 13, 2018 | 1–0 | (Scotland) Friendly |
| 640 | France | January 19, 2019 | 1–3 | (France) Friendly |
| 641 | Spain | January 22, 2019 | 1–0 | (Spain) Friendly |
| 642 | Japan | February 27, 2019 | 2–2 | (United States) SheBelieves Cup |
| 643 | England | March 2, 2019 | 2–2 | (United States) SheBelieves Cup |
| 644 | Brazil | March 5, 2019 | 1–0 | (United States) SheBelieves Cup |
| 645 | Australia | April 4, 2019 | 5–3 | (United States) Friendly |
| 646 | Belgium | April 7, 2019 | 6–0 | (United States) Friendly |
| 647 | South Africa | May 12, 2019 | 3–0 | (United States) Friendly |
| 648 | New Zealand | May 16, 2019 | 5–0 | (United States) Friendly |
| 649 | Mexico | May 26, 2019 | 3–0 | (United States) Friendly |
| 650 | Thailand | June 11, 2019 | 13–0 | (France) World Cup |
| 651 | Chile | June 16, 2019 | 3–0 | (France) World Cup |
| 652 | Sweden | June 20, 2019 | 2–0 | (France) World Cup |
| 653 | Spain | June 24, 2019 | 2–1 | (France) World Cup R16 |
| 654 | France | June 28, 2019 | 2–1 | (France) World Cup QF |
| 655 | England | July 2, 2019 | 2–1 | (France) World Cup SF |
| 656 | Netherlands | July 7, 2019 | 2–0 | (France) World Cup Final |
| 657 | Republic of Ireland | August 3, 2019 | 3–0 | (United States) Friendly |
| 658 | Portugal | August 29, 2019 | 4–0 | (United States) Friendly |
| 659 | Portugal | September 3, 2019 | 3–0 | (United States) Friendly |
| 660 | South Korea | October 3, 2019 | 2–0 | (United States) Friendly |
| 661 | South Korea | October 6, 2019 | 1–1 | (United States) Friendly |
| 662 | Sweden | November 7, 2019 | 3–2 | (United States) Friendly |
| 663 | Costa Rica | November 10, 2019 | 6–0 | (United States) Friendly |

== 2020–2029 ==
=== 2020–2029 ===
2020–2029
Win Draw Defeat
| M | Opponent | Date | Result | Event |
| 664 | Haiti | January 28, 2020 | 4–0 | (United States) Olympic Qualifying |
| 665 | Panama | January 31, 2020 | 8–0 | (United States) Olympic Qualifying |
| 666 | Costa Rica | February 3, 2020 | 6–0 | (United States) Olympic Qualifying |
| 667 | Mexico | February 7, 2020 | 4–0 | (United States) Olympic Qualifying SF |
| 668 | Canada | February 9, 2020 | 3–0 | (United States) Olympic Qualifying F |
| 669 | England | March 5, 2020 | 2–0 | (United States) SheBelieves Cup |
| 670 | Spain | March 8, 2020 | 1–0 | (United States) SheBelieves Cup |
| 671 | Japan | March 11, 2020 | 3–1 | (United States) SheBelieves Cup |
| 672 | Netherlands | November 27, 2020 | 2–0 | (Netherlands) Friendly |
| 673 | Colombia | January 18, 2021 | 4–0 | (United States) Friendly |
| 674 | Colombia | January 22, 2021 | 6–0 | (United States) Friendly |
| 675 | Canada | February 18, 2021 | 1–0 | (United States) SheBelieves Cup |
| 676 | Brazil | February 21, 2021 | 2–0 | (United States) SheBelieves Cup |
| 677 | Argentina | February 24, 2021 | 6–0 | (United States) SheBelieves Cup |
| 678 | Sweden | April 10, 2021 | 1–1 | (Sweden) Friendly |
| 679 | France | April 13, 2021 | 2–0 | (France) Friendly |
| 680 | Portugal | June 10, 2021 | 1–0 | (United States) Friendly |
| 681 | Jamaica | June 13, 2021 | 4–0 | (United States) Friendly |
| 682 | Nigeria | June 16, 2021 | 2–0 | (United States) Friendly |
| 683 | Mexico | July 1, 2021 | 4–0 | (United States) Friendly |
| 684 | Mexico | July 5, 2021 | 4–0 | (United States) Friendly |
| 685 | Sweden | July 21, 2021 | 0–3 | (Japan) Olympics |
| 686 | New Zealand | July 24, 2021 | 6–1 | (Japan) Olympics |
| 687 | Australia | July 27, 2021 | 0–0 | (Japan) Olympics |
| 688 | Netherlands | July 30, 2021 | 2(4)–2(2) | (Japan) Olympics QF |
| 689 | Canada | August 2, 2021 | 0–1 | (Japan) Olympics SF |
| 690 | Australia | August 5, 2021 | 4–3 | (Japan) Olympics 3rd |
| 691 | Paraguay | September 16, 2021 | 9–0 | (United States) Friendly |
| 692 | Paraguay | September 21, 2021 | 8–0 | (United States) Friendly |
| 693 | South Korea | October 21, 2021 | 0–0 | (United States) Friendly |
| 694 | South Korea | October 26, 2021 | 6–0 | (United States) Friendly |
| 695 | Australia | November 26, 2021 | 3–0 | (Australia) Friendly |
| 696 | Australia | November 30, 2021 | 1–1 | (Australia) Friendly |
| 697 | Czech Republic | February 17, 2022 | 0–0 | (United States) SheBelieves Cup |
| 698 | New Zealand | February 20, 2022 | 5–0 | (United States) SheBelieves Cup |
| 699 | Iceland | February 23, 2022 | 5–0 | (United States) SheBelieves Cup |
| 700 | Uzbekistan | April 9, 2022 | 9–1 | (United States) Friendly |
| 701 | Uzbekistan | April 12, 2022 | 9–0 | (United States) Friendly |
| 702 | Colombia | June 25, 2022 | 3–0 | (United States) Friendly |
| 703 | Colombia | June 28, 2022 | 2–0 | (United States) Friendly |
| 704 | Haiti | July 4, 2022 | 3–0 | (Mexico) CONCACAF W Championship |
| 705 | Jamaica | July 7, 2022 | 5–0 | (Mexico) CONCACAF W Championship |
| 706 | Mexico | July 11, 2022 | 1–0 | (Mexico) CONCACAF W Championship |
| 707 | Costa Rica | July 14, 2022 | 3–0 | (Mexico) CONCACAF W Championship SF |
| 708 | Canada | July 18, 2022 | 1–0 | (Mexico) CONCACAF W Championship F |
| 709 | Nigeria | September 3, 2022 | 4–0 | (United States) Friendly |
| 710 | Nigeria | September 6, 2022 | 2–1 | (United States) Friendly |
| 711 | England | October 7, 2022 | 1–2 | (England) Friendly |
| 712 | Spain | October 11, 2022 | 0–2 | (Spain) Friendly |
| 713 | Germany | November 10, 2022 | 1–2 | (United States) Friendly |
| 714 | Germany | November 13, 2022 | 2–1 | (United States) Friendly |
| 715 | New Zealand | January 17, 2023 | 4–0 | (New Zealand) Friendly |
| 716 | New Zealand | January 20, 2023 | 5–0 | (New Zealand) Friendly |
| 717 | Canada | February 16, 2023 | 2–0 | (United States) SheBelieves Cup |
| 718 | Japan | February 19, 2023 | 1–0 | (United States) SheBelieves Cup |
| 719 | Brazil | February 22, 2023 | 2–1 | (United States) SheBelieves Cup |
| 720 | Republic of Ireland | April 8, 2023 | 2–0 | (United States) Friendly |
| 721 | Republic of Ireland | April 11, 2023 | 1–0 | (United States) Friendly |
| 722 | Wales | July 9, 2023 | 2–0 | (United States) Friendly |
| 723 | Vietnam | July 21, 2023 | 3–0 | (New Zealand) World Cup |
| 724 | Netherlands | July 26, 2023 | 1–1 | (New Zealand) World Cup |
| 725 | Portugal | August 1, 2023 | 0–0 | (New Zealand) World Cup |
| 726 | Sweden | August 6, 2023 | 0(4)–0(5) | (Australia) World Cup R16 |
| 727 | South Africa | September 21, 2023 | 3–0 | (United States) Friendly |
| 728 | South Africa | September 24, 2023 | 2–0 | (United States) Friendly |
| 729 | Colombia | October 26, 2023 | 0–0 | (United States) Friendly |
| 730 | Colombia | October 29, 2023 | 3–0 | (United States) Friendly |
| 731 | China | December 2, 2023 | 3–0 | (United States) Friendly |
| 732 | China | December 5, 2023 | 2–1 | (United States) Friendly |
| 733 | Dominican Republic | February 20, 2024 | 5–0 | (United States) Gold Cup |
| 734 | Argentina | February 23, 2024 | 4–0 | (United States) Gold Cup |
| 735 | Mexico | February 26, 2024 | 0–2 | (United States) Gold Cup |
| 736 | Colombia | March 3, 2024 | 3–0 | (United States) Gold Cup QF |
| 737 | Canada | March 6, 2024 | 2(3)–2(1) | (United States) Gold Cup SF |
| 738 | Brazil | March 10, 2024 | 1–0 | (United States) Gold Cup F |
| 739 | Japan | April 6, 2024 | 2–1 | (United States) SheBelieves Cup SF |
| 740 | Canada | April 9, 2024 | 2(5)–2(4) | (United States) SheBelieves Cup F |
| 741 | South Korea | June 1, 2024 | 4–0 | (United States) Friendly |
| 742 | South Korea | June 4, 2024 | 3–0 | (United States) Friendly |
| 743 | Mexico | July 13, 2024 | 1–0 | (United States) Friendly |
| 744 | Costa Rica | July 16, 2024 | 0–0 | (United States) Friendly |
| 745 | Zambia | July 25, 2024 | 3–0 | (France) Olympics |
| 746 | Germany | July 28, 2024 | 4–1 | (France) Olympics |
| 747 | Australia | July 31, 2024 | 2–1 | (France) Olympics |
| 748 | Japan | August 3, 2024 | 1–0 | (France) Olympics QF |
| 749 | Germany | August 6, 2024 | 1–0 | (France) Olympics SF |
| 750 | Brazil | August 10, 2024 | 1–0 | (France) Olympics F |
| 751 | Iceland | October 24, 2024 | 3–1 | (United States) Friendly |
| 752 | Iceland | October 27, 2024 | 3–1 | (United States) Friendly |
| 753 | Argentina | October 30, 2024 | 3–0 | (United States) Friendly |
| 754 | England | November 30, 2024 | 0–0 | (England) Friendly |
| 755 | Netherlands | December 3, 2024 | 2–1 | (Netherlands) Friendly |
| 756 | Colombia | February 20, 2025 | 2–0 | (United States) SheBelieves Cup |
| 757 | Australia | February 23, 2025 | 2–1 | (United States) SheBelieves Cup |
| 758 | Japan | February 26, 2025 | 1–2 | (United States) SheBelieves Cup |
| 759 | Brazil | April 5, 2025 | 2–0 | (United States) Friendly |
| 760 | Brazil | April 8, 2025 | 1–2 | (United States) Friendly |
| 761 | China | May 31, 2025 | 3–0 | (United States) Friendly |
| 762 | Jamaica | June 3, 2025 | 4–0 | (United States) Friendly |
| 763 | Republic of Ireland | June 26, 2025 | 4–0 | (United States) Friendly |
| 764 | Republic of Ireland | June 29, 2025 | 4–0 | (United States) Friendly |
| 765 | Canada | July 2, 2025 | 3–0 | (United States) Friendly |
| 766 | Portugal | October 23, 2025 | 1–2 | (United States) Friendly |
| 767 | Portugal | October 26, 2025 | 3–1 | (United States) Friendly |
| 768 | New Zealand | October 29, 2025 | 6–0 | (United States) Friendly |
| 769 | Italy | November 28, 2025 | 3–0 | (United States) Friendly |
| 770 | Italy | December 1, 2025 | 2–0 | (United States) Friendly |
| 771 | Paraguay | January 24, 2026 | 6–0 | (United States) Friendly |
| 772 | Chile | January 27, 2026 | 5–0 | (United States) Friendly |
| 773 | Argentina | March 1, 2026 | 2–0 | (United States) SheBelieves Cup |
| 774 | Canada | March 4, 2026 | 1–0 | (United States) SheBelieves Cup |
| 775 | Colombia | March 7, 2026 | 1–0 | (United States) SheBelieves Cup |
| 776 | Japan | April 11, 2026 | 2–1 | (United States) Friendly |
| 777 | Japan | April 14, 2026 | 0–1 | (United States) Friendly |
| 778 | Japan | April 17, 2026 | 3–0 | (United States) Friendly |
| 779 | Brazil | June 6, 2026 | 1–2 | (Brazil) Friendly |
| 780 | Brazil | June 9, 2026 | 1–0 | (Brazil) Friendly |
| 781 | Spain | October 10, 2026 | 0–2 | (United States) Friendly |
| 782 | Spain | October 13, 2026 | 2–2 | (United States) Friendly |
| 783 | El Salvador | November 27, 2026 | – | (United States) CONCACAF W Championship |
| 784 | Panama | January 12, 2027 | – | (United States) Friendly |

== Head-to-head records ==
As of October 13, 2026

Key
| Positive balance (more Wins) |
| Neutral balance (Wins = Losses) |
| Negative balance (more Losses) |

| Opponent | GP | W | D | L | GF | GA | GD | First match | Most recent match | Win % |
|---|---|---|---|---|---|---|---|---|---|---|
| Canada | 68 | 55 | 9 | 4 | 195 | 44 | +151 | July 7, 1986 | March 4, 2026 | 0.875 |
| China | 61 | 39 | 13 | 9 | 107 | 38 | +69 | July 20, 1986 | May 31, 2025 | 0.775 |
| Norway | 50 | 29 | 2 | 19 | 93 | 61 | +32 | July 5, 1987 | June 11, 2017 | 0.600 |
| Japan | 45 | 34 | 8 | 3 | 119 | 35 | +84 | July 25, 1986 | April 17, 2026 | 0.844 |
| Brazil | 45 | 35 | 5 | 5 | 95 | 32 | +63 | July 22, 1986 | June 9, 2026 | 0.833 |
| Mexico | 44 | 41 | 1 | 2 | 173 | 17 | +156 | April 18, 1991 | July 13, 2024 | 0.943 |
| Sweden | 43 | 23 | 13 | 7 | 72 | 39 | +33 | July 9, 1987 | August 6, 2023 | 0.686 |
| Germany | 37 | 25 | 7 | 5 | 74 | 34 | +40 | May 30, 1991 | August 6, 2024 | 0.770 |
| Australia | 36 | 30 | 5 | 1 | 104 | 32 | +72 | December 16, 1987 | February 23, 2025 | 0.903 |
| Denmark | 25 | 17 | 3 | 5 | 63 | 22 | +41 | August 21, 1985 | January 21, 2018 | 0.740 |
| France | 25 | 19 | 3 | 3 | 58 | 23 | +35 | July 29, 1988 | April 13, 2021 | 0.820 |
| New Zealand | 22 | 20 | 1 | 1 | 88 | 7 | +81 | December 15, 1987 | October 29, 2025 | 0.932 |
| England | 20 | 12 | 3 | 5 | 41 | 15 | +26 | August 23, 1985 | November 30, 2024 | 0.675 |
| Costa Rica | 18 | 17 | 1 | 0 | 90 | 2 | +88 | June 25, 2000 | July 16, 2024 | 0.972 |
| South Korea | 17 | 13 | 4 | 0 | 56 | 5 | +51 | May 2, 1997 | June 4, 2024 | 0.882 |
| Iceland | 17 | 15 | 2 | 0 | 49 | 8 | +41 | May 8, 1998 | October 27, 2024 | 0.941 |
| Republic of Ireland | 17 | 17 | 0 | 0 | 59 | 1 | +58 | September 4, 1999 | June 29, 2025 | 1.000 |
| Italy | 17 | 12 | 1 | 4 | 33 | 8 | +25 | August 18, 1985 | December 1, 2025 | 0.735 |
| Colombia | 15 | 13 | 2 | 0 | 44 | 2 | +42 | July 2, 2011 | March 7, 2026 | 0.933 |
| Finland | 14 | 14 | 0 | 0 | 46 | 2 | +44 | March 14, 1995 | March 7, 2011 | 1.000 |
| Portugal | 13 | 11 | 1 | 1 | 43 | 3 | +40 | March 16, 1994 | October 26, 2025 | 0.885 |
| Netherlands | 12 | 9 | 2 | 1 | 34 | 10 | +24 | May 28, 1991 | December 3, 2024 | 0.833 |
| Trinidad and Tobago | 11 | 11 | 0 | 0 | 74 | 2 | +72 | April 22, 1991 | October 10, 2018 | 1.000 |
| Russia | 10 | 9 | 1 | 0 | 51 | 8 | +43 | July 14, 1993 | April 9, 2017 | 0.950 |
| Haiti | 8 | 8 | 0 | 0 | 49 | 0 | +49 | April 25, 1991 | July 4, 2022 | 1.000 |
| Nigeria | 8 | 8 | 0 | 0 | 25 | 3 | +22 | June 24, 1999 | September 6, 2022 | 1.000 |
| Argentina | 7 | 7 | 0 | 0 | 37 | 1 | +36 | April 24, 1998 | March 1, 2026 | 1.000 |
| North Korea | 6 | 5 | 1 | 0 | 14 | 2 | +12 | June 27, 1999 | March 12, 2014 | 0.917 |
| Jamaica | 6 | 6 | 0 | 0 | 35 | 0 | +35 | August 19, 1994 | June 3, 2025 | 1.000 |
| Spain | 6 | 3 | 1 | 2 | 6 | 7 | –1 | January 22, 2019 | October 13, 2026 | 0.500 |
| Chinese Taipei | 5 | 4 | 0 | 1 | 30 | 3 | +27 | December 10, 1987 | October 1, 2006 | 0.800 |
| Ukraine | 4 | 4 | 0 | 0 | 20 | 1 | +19 | January 18, 1996 | July 10, 2005 | 1.000 |
| Switzerland | 4 | 4 | 0 | 0 | 16 | 2 | +14 | August 20, 2014 | October 23, 2016 | 1.000 |
| Scotland | 4 | 4 | 0 | 0 | 16 | 4 | +12 | September 8, 2002 | November 13, 2018 | 1.000 |
| South Africa | 4 | 4 | 0 | 0 | 9 | 0 | +9 | July 9, 2016 | September 24, 2023 | 1.000 |
| Chile | 4 | 4 | 0 | 0 | 15 | 0 | +15 | August 31, 2018 | January 27, 2026 | 1.000 |
| Guatemala | 3 | 3 | 0 | 0 | 27 | 0 | +27 | October 30, 2010 | October 17, 2014 | 1.000 |
| Panama | 3 | 3 | 0 | 0 | 22 | 0 | +22 | November 2, 2002 | January 31, 2020 | 1.000 |
| Paraguay | 3 | 3 | 0 | 0 | 23 | 0 | +23 | September 16, 2021 | January 24, 2026 | 1.000 |
| West Germany | 2 | 2 | 0 | 0 | 5 | 1 | +4 | July 22, 1988 | August 11, 1990 | 1.000 |
| Soviet Union | 2 | 2 | 0 | 0 | 13 | 0 | +13 | August 5, 1990 | April 7, 1991 | 1.000 |
| Romania | 2 | 2 | 0 | 0 | 13 | 1 | +12 | November 10, 2016 | November 13, 2016 | 1.000 |
| Thailand | 2 | 2 | 0 | 0 | 22 | 0 | +22 | September 15, 2016 | June 11, 2019 | 1.000 |
| Czech Republic | 2 | 1 | 1 | 0 | 8 | 1 | +7 | January 7, 2000 | February 17, 2022 | 0.750 |
| Uzbekistan | 2 | 2 | 0 | 0 | 18 | 1 | +17 | April 9, 2022 | April 12, 2022 | 1.000 |
| Dominican Republic | 2 | 2 | 0 | 0 | 19 | 0 | +19 | January 20, 2012 | February 20, 2024 | 1.000 |
| Czechoslovakia | 1 | 0 | 1 | 0 | 0 | 0 | 0 | June 5, 1988 | | 0.500 |
| Poland | 1 | 0 | 1 | 0 | 0 | 0 | 0 | June 21, 1989 | | 0.500 |
| (Socialist Federal Republic of Yugoslavia) Yugoslavia | 1 | 1 | 0 | 0 | 8 | 0 | +8 | April 1, 1991 | | 1.000 |
| Bulgaria | 1 | 1 | 0 | 0 | 3 | 0 | +3 | April 2, 1991 | | 1.000 |
| Hungary | 1 | 1 | 0 | 0 | 6 | 0 | +6 | April 3, 1991 | | 1.000 |
| Martinique | 1 | 1 | 0 | 0 | 12 | 0 | +12 | April 20, 1991 | | 1.000 |
| Greece | 1 | 1 | 0 | 0 | 3 | 0 | +3 | August 11, 2004 | | 1.000 |
| Puerto Rico | 1 | 1 | 0 | 0 | 10 | 0 | +10 | February 15, 2016 | | 1.000 |
| Belgium | 1 | 1 | 0 | 0 | 6 | 0 | +6 | April 7, 2019 | | 1.000 |
| Wales | 1 | 1 | 0 | 0 | 2 | 0 | +2 | July 9, 2023 | | 1.000 |
| Vietnam | 1 | 1 | 0 | 0 | 3 | 0 | +3 | July 21, 2023 | | 1.000 |
| Zambia | 1 | 1 | 0 | 0 | 3 | 0 | +3 | July 25, 2024 | | 1.000 |

== Number of matches by state ==
- Includes all matches on U.S. soil, including friendlies, Concacaf Championship, Olympic Qualifying, 1999 World Cup, 1996 Olympics, and others.

As of October 13, 2026

| Rank | State | Matches | Most recent | Opponent |
|---|---|---|---|---|
| 1 | California | 65 | April 11, 2026 | Japan |
| 2 | Florida | 42 | December 1, 2025 | Italy |
| 3 | Texas | 34 | February 20, 2025 | Colombia |
| 4 | Ohio | 26 | March 4, 2026 | Canada |
| 5 | Pennsylvania | 23 | October 13, 2026 | Spain |
| 6 | Minnesota | 19 | May 31, 2024 | China |
| 7 | North Carolina | 17 | October 3, 2019 | South Korea |
| 7 | New Jersey | 17 | March 7, 2026 | Colombia |
| 9 | Illinois | 16 | September 24, 2023 | South Africa |
| 10 | Connecticut | 14 | October 26, 2025 | Portugal |
| 10 | (Washington, D.C.) Washington D.C. | 14 | October 10, 2026 | Spain |
| 11 | (New York (state)) New York | 13 | September 18, 2014 | Mexico |
| 13 | Oregon | 12 | November 28, 2012 | Republic of Ireland |
| 13 | Massachusetts | 12 | June 15, 2013 | South Korea |
| 13 | Missouri | 12 | October 29, 2025 | New Zealand |
| 16 | Colorado | 11 | April 17, 2026 | Japan |
| 17 | (Georgia (U.S. state)) Georgia | 10 | April 6, 2024 | Japan |
| 17 | Tennessee | 10 | March 1, 2026 | Argentina |
| 19 | Utah | 8 | October 26, 2023 | Colombia |
| 20 | Virginia | 6 | November 1, 2008 | South Korea |
| 20 | Kansas | 6 | September 3, 2022 | Nigeria |
| 20 | (Washington (state)) Washington | 6 | April 14, 2026 | Japan |
| 23 | Kentucky | 5 | October 30, 2024 | Argentina |
| 23 | Arizona | 5 | February 23, 2025 | Australia |
| 25 | South Carolina | 4 | July 22, 2009 | Canada |
| 25 | Michigan | 4 | September 17, 2015 | Haiti |
| 25 | Alabama | 4 | September 20, 2015 | Haiti |
| 28 | Maryland | 3 | August 15, 2000 | Russia |
| 28 | Louisiana | 3 | October 19, 2017 | South Korea |
| 30 | Indiana | 2 | May 8, 1998 | Iceland |
| 30 | Wisconsin | 2 | May 13, 1999 | Netherlands |
| 30 | New Mexico | 2 | October 20, 2007 | Mexico |
| 33 | Nebraska | 1 | July 13, 2010 | Sweden |

== Results by home stadium ==
As of October 13, 2026

| Matches | Stadium | Location | Record attendance | First match | Opponent | Score | Most recent match | Opponent | Score | Record (W–L–D) |
|---|---|---|---|---|---|---|---|---|---|---|
| 22 | Dignity Health Sports Park (StubHub Center, Home Depot Center) | Carson, California | 27,000 (sellout) | September 1, 2003 | Costa Rica | 5–0 | January 24, 2026 | Paraguay | 6–0 | 20–1–1 |
| 14 | National Sports Center | Blaine, Minnesota | 10,276 | July 7, 1986 | Canada | 2–0 | July 15, 2006 | Sweden | 3–2 | 11–3–0 |
| 13 | Toyota Stadium (Pizza Hut Park) | Frisco, Texas | 20,862 | May 12, 2007 | Canada | 6–2 | December 5, 2023 | China | 2–1 | 13–0–0 |
| 10 | RFK Stadium | (Washington, D.C.) Washington D.C. | 46,037 (Note: Doubleheader with a D.C. United match) | August 6, 1995 | Norway | 2-1 | March 7, 2017 | France | 0–3 | 9–1–0 |
| 10 | WakeMed Soccer Park (Sahlen's Stadium, SAS Soccer Park) | Cary, North Carolina | 9,992 | October 2, 2002 | Australia | 4–0 | October 10, 2018 | Trinidad and Tobago | 7–0 | 10–0–0 |
| 10 | Shell Energy Stadium (BBVA Stadium, PNC Stadium) | Houston, Texas | 15,543 | December 12, 2012 | China | 4–0 | February 20, 2025 | Colombia | 2–0 | 10–0–0 |
| 10 | Pratt & Whitney Stadium at Rentschler Field | East Hartford, Connecticut | 27,758 | August 1, 2004 | China | 3–1 | October 26, 2025 | Portugal | 3–1 | 7–0–3 |
| 10 | Sports Illustrated Stadium (Red Bull Arena) | Harrison, New Jersey | 26,500 | June 5, 2011 | Mexico | 1–0 | March 7, 2026 | Colombia | 1–0 | 7–1–2 |
| 10 | Dick's Sporting Goods Park | Commerce City, Colorado | 19,010 | July 13, 2008 | Brazil | 1–0 | April 17, 2026 | Japan | 3–0 | 9–0–1 |
| 10 | Subaru Park (Talen Energy Stadium, PPL Park) | Chester, Pennsylvania | 18,573 | October 6, 2010 | China | 1–1 | October 13, 2026 | Spain | 2–2 | 6–1–3 |
| 9 | Mapfre Stadium (Columbus Crew Stadium) | Columbus, Ohio | 23,101 | October 3, 1999 | South Korea | 5–0 | November 7, 2019 | Sweden | 3–2 | 7–1–1 |
| 9 | Soldier Field | Chicago, Illinois | 65,080 | June 28, 1998 | Germany | 4–2 | September 24, 2023 | South Africa | 2–0 | 8–0–1 |
| 9 | Inter&Co Stadium (Exploria Stadium, Orlando City Stadium) | Orlando, Florida | 16,531 | March 7, 2018 | England | 1–0 | November 28, 2025 | Italy | 3–0 | 9–0–0 |
| 8 | Providence Park (Civic Stadium, PGE Park, Jeld-Wen Field) | Portland, Oregon | 27,623 | June 6, 1999 | Canada | 4–2 | November 28, 2012 | Republic of Ireland | 5–0 | 7–1–0 |
| 7 | America First Field (Rio Tinto Stadium) | Sandy, Utah | 16,805 | March 31, 2010 | Mexico | 1–0 | October 26, 2023 | Colombia | 0–0 | 6–0–1 |
| 7 | PayPal Park (Avaya Stadium) | San Jose, California | 18,000 (sellout) | May 10, 2015 | Republic of Ireland | 3–0 | April 11, 2026 | Japan | 2–1 | 6–1–0 |
| 6 | CEFCU Stadium (Spartan Stadium) | San Jose, California | 26,853 | May 9, 1997 | England | 5–0 | July 28, 2007 | Japan | 4–1 | 6–0–0 |
| 6 | Camping World Stadium (Citrus Bowl) | Orlando, Florida | 34,416 (Note: Doubleheader with 1998 MLS All-Star Game) | July 21, 1996 | Denmark | 3–0 | October 25, 2015 | Brazil | 3–1 | 6–0–0 |
| 6 | SeatGeek Stadium (Toyota Park) | Bridgeview, Illinois | 19,522 | August 27, 2006 | China | 4–1 | August 2, 2018 | Brazil | 4–1 | 5–0–1 |
| 6 | Children's Mercy Park (Sporting Park) | Kansas City, Kansas | 18,467 (sellout) | September 17, 2011 | Canada | 1–1 | September 3, 2022 | Nigeria | 4–0 | 4–0–2 |
| 5 | Foxboro Stadium | Foxborough, Massachusetts | 50,484 | September 12, 1998 | Mexico | 9–0 | July 3, 2000 | Brazil | 1–0 | 4–0–1 |
| 5 | Giants Stadium | East Rutherford, New Jersey | 78,972 | April 25, 1999 | China | 1–2 | September 17, 2008 | Republic of Ireland | 1–0 | 3–1–1 |
| 5 | Rose Bowl | Pasadena, California | 90,185 | March 28, 1999 | Mexico | 3–0 | August 3, 2019 | Republic of Ireland | 3–0 | 4–0–1 |
| 5 | FirstEnergy Stadium (Cleveland Browns Stadium) | Cleveland, Ohio | 23,535 | June 16, 2007 | China | 2–0 | September 16, 2021 | Paraguay | 9–0 | 5–0–0 |
| 4 | New Britain Stadium | New Britain, Connecticut | 6,562 | August 30, 1991 | Norway | 0–1 | May 31, 1997 | Canada | 4–0 | 2–2–0 |
| 4 | Cardinal Stadium | Louisville, Kentucky | 35,211 | October 10, 1999 | Brazil | 4–2 | June 6, 2004 | Japan | 1–1 | 3–0–1 |
| 4 | Arrowhead Stadium | Kansas City, Missouri | 36,405 | October 7, 1999 | Finland | 6–0 | October 16, 2004 | Mexico | 1–0 | 2–0–2 |
| 4 | Titan Stadium | Fullerton, California | 10,099 | April 20, 1996 | Netherlands | 6–0 | October 16, 2005 | Australia | 0–0 | 3–0–1 |
| 4 | MUSC Health Stadium (Blackbaud Stadium) | Charleston, South Carolina | 5,634 | January 12, 2002 | Mexico | 7–0 | July 22, 2009 | Canada | 1–0 | 4–0–0 |
| 4 | Torero Stadium | San Diego, California | 7,502 | January 12, 2003 | Japan | 0–0 | March 28, 2010 | Mexico | 3–0 | 3–0–1 |
| 4 | Marina Auto Stadium (PAETEC Park, Sahlen's Stadium) | (New York (state)) Rochester, New York | 13,206 | September 13, 2006 | Mexico | 3–1 | September 18, 2014 | Mexico | 4–0 | 4–0–0 |
| 4 | Legion Field | Birmingham, Alabama | 35,735 | May 17, 2003 | England | 6–0 | September 20, 2015 | Haiti | 8–0 | 4–0–0 |
| 4 | SDCCU Stadium (Qualcomm Stadium) | San Diego, California | 23,309 | April 10, 2014 | China | 3–0 | January 21, 2018 | Denmark | 5–1 | 4–0–0 |
| 4 | Nissan Stadium (The Coliseum, LP Field) | Nashville, Tennessee | 25,363 | July 3, 2004 | Canada | 1–0 | March 2, 2019 | England | 2–2 | 3–0–1 |
| 4 | Raymond James Stadium | Tampa, Florida | 14,009 | November 8, 2008 | South Korea | 1–0 | March 5, 2019 | Brazil | 1–0 | 4–0–0 |
| 4 | Lincoln Financial Field | Philadelphia, Pennsylvania | 31,553 | September 25, 2003 | Nigeria | 5–0 | August 29, 2019 | Portugal | 4–0 | 3–1–0 |
| 4 | TIAA Bank Field (Municipal Stadium, EverBank Field) | Jacksonville, Florida | 18,656 | February 4, 1996 | Norway | 1–2 | November 10, 2019 | Costa Rica | 6–0 | 3–1–0 |
| 4 | State Farm Stadium (University of Phoenix Stadium) | Glendale, Arizona | 23,503 | November 19, 2011 | Sweden | 1–1 | February 23, 2025 | Australia | 2–1 | 3–0–1 |
| 4 | Snapdragon Stadium | San Diego, California | 17,188 | October 29, 2023 | Colombia | 3–0 | February 26, 2025 | Japan | 1–2 | 2–1–1 |
| 4 | Allianz Field | Saint Paul, Minnesota | 19,600 | September 3, 2019 | Portugal | 3–0 | May 31, 2025 | China | 3–0 | 4–0–0 |
| 4 | Audi Field | (Washington, D.C.) Washington, D.C. | 19,220 | September 6, 2022 | Nigeria | 2–1 | October 10, 2026 | Spain | 0–2 | 2–1–1 |
| 3 | New Hyde Park Memorial High School | (New York (state)) New Hyde Park, New York | 1,637 | August 4, 1993 | New Zealand | 3–0 | August 8, 1993 | Canada | 1–0 | 3–0–0 |
| 3 | Decatur High School | (Georgia (U.S. state)) Decatur, Georgia | 5,532 | April 10, 1993 | Germany | 3–0 | March 14, 1996 | Germany | 6–0 | 1–0–0 |
| 3 | Richardson Stadium | Davidson, North Carolina | 3,459 | April 30, 1995 | Finland | 6–0 | April 5, 2000 | Iceland | 8–0 | 3–0–0 |
| 3 | Mitchel Athletic Complex | (New York (state)) Uniondale, New York | 11,307 | July 25, 1998 | Denmark | 5–0 | September 29, 2002 | Russia | 5–1 | 3–0–0 |
| 3 | Merlo Field | Portland, Oregon | 5,039 | May 14, 1995 | Brazil | 4–1 | July 10, 2005 | Ukraine | 7–0 | 3–0–0 |
| 3 | City Stadium (University of Richmond Stadium) | Richmond, Virginia | 9,147 | September 20, 1998 | Brazil | 3–0 | November 1, 2008 | South Korea | 3–1 | 3–0–0 |
| 3 | Gillette Stadium | Foxborough, Massachusetts | 25,106 | October 1, 2003 | Norway | 1–0 | June 15, 2013 | South Korea | 4–1 | 3–0–0 |
| 3 | Ford Field | Detroit, Michigan | 34,538 | December 17, 2008 | China | 1–0 | September 17, 2015 | Haiti | 5–0 | 3–0–0 |
| 3 | FAU Stadium | Boca Raton, Florida | 13,501 | December 15, 2012 | China | 4–1 | March 9, 2016 | Germany | 2–1 | 3–0–0 |
| 3 | Bank of America Stadium (Ericsson Stadium) | Charlotte, North Carolina | 30,071 | April 29, 1999 | Japan | 9–0 | October 3, 2019 | South Korea | 2–0 | 2–0–1 |
| 3 | Q2 Stadium | Austin, Texas | 20,593 (sellout) | June 16, 2021 | Nigeria | 2–0 | October 24, 2024 | Iceland | 3–1 | 3–0–0 |
| 3 | TQL Stadium | Cincinnati, Ohio | 24,016 | September 21, 2021 | Paraguay | 8–0 | June 29, 2025 | Republic of Ireland | 4–0 | 3–0–0 |
| 3 | Geodis Park | Nashville, Tennessee | 25,471 | February 19, 2023 | Japan | 1–0 | March 1, 2026 | Argentina | 2–0 | 3–0–0 |
| 3 | ScottsMiracle-Gro Field (Lower.com Field) | Columbus, Ohio | 19,049 | April 9, 2022 | Uzbekistan | 9–1 | March 4, 2026 | Canada | 1–0 | 2–0–1 |
| 3 | Lumen Field (CenturyLink Field) | (Washington (state)) Seattle, Washington | 36,128 | October 21, 2015 | Brazil | 1–1 | April 14, 2026 | Japan | 0–1 | 0–2–1 |
| 2 | Zimman Field | Medford, Massachusetts | 4,758 | September 1, 1991 | Norway | 1–2 | August 14, 1992 | Norway | 1–3 | 0–2–0 |
| 2 | Bensalem High School | Oakford, Pennsylvania | 3,127 | October 4, 1991 | China | 1–2 | April 7, 1993 | Germany | 1–2 | 0–2–0 |
| 2 | Yurcak Field | Piscataway, New Jersey | 5,826 | August 3, 1994 | China | 1–0 | August 3, 1995 | Australia | 4–2 | 2–0–0 |
| 2 | George Mason Stadium | Fairfax, Virginia | 5,731 | October 12, 1991 | China | 2–0 | July 31, 1994 | Germany | 2–1 | 2–0–0 |
| 2 | Commerce Bank Field at Foley Stadium | Worcester, Massachusetts | 6,511 | August 7, 1994 | Norway | 4–1 | May 12, 1996 | Canada | 6–0 | 2–0–0 |
| 2 | Sanford Stadium | (Georgia (U.S. state)) Athens, Georgia | 76,489 | July 28, 1996 | Norway | 2–1 AET | August 1, 1996 | China | 2–1 | 2–0–0 |
| 2 | Kuntz Memorial Soccer Stadium | Indianapolis, Indiana | 5,123 | April 28, 1996 | France | 8–2 | May 8, 1998 | Iceland | 6–0 | 2–0–0 |
| 2 | World Wide Technology Soccer Park (St. Louis Soccer Park) | Fenton, Missouri | 6,200 | April 26, 1996 | France | 4–1 | June 25, 1998 | Germany | 1–1 | 1–0–1 |
| 2 | Pepin-Rood Stadium | Tampa, Florida | 2,641 | February 2, 1996 | Norway | 3–2 | February 27, 1999 | Finland | 2–0 | 3–0–0 |
| 2 | Uihlein Soccer Park | Milwaukee, Wisconsin | 6,767 | May 2, 1997 | South Korea | 7–0 | May 13, 1999 | Netherlands | 5–0 | 2–0–0 |
| 2 | Seminole County Training Center | Orlando, Florida | 0 (Note: Played behind closed doors) | January 27, 1999 | Portugal | 7–0 | February 24, 1999 | Finland | 3-1 | 2–0–0 |
| 2 | Lockhart Stadium | Ft. Lauderdale, Florida | 12,031 | January 30, 1999 | Portugal | 6–0 | February 6, 2000 | Norway | 2–3 | 1–1–0 |
| 2 | Hersheypark Stadium | Hershey, Pennsylvania | 15,257 | April 22, 1999 | China | 2–1 | June 23, 2000 | Trinidad and Tobago | 11–0 | 2–0–0 |
| 2 | T-Mobile Park (SAFECO Field) | (Washington (state)) Seattle, Washington | 21,522 | November 2, 2002 | Panama | 9–0 | November 6, 2002 | Costa Rica | 7–0 | 2–0–0 |
| 2 | Frontier Field | (New York (state)) Rochester, New York | 14,870 | September 18, 1998 | Russia | 4–0 | September 25, 2004 | Iceland | 4–3 | 2–0–0 |
| 2 | Dreamstyle Stadium (University Stadium) | Albuquerque, New Mexico | 17,805 | May 9, 2004 | Mexico | 3–0 | October 20, 2007 | Mexico | 1–1 | 1–0–1 |
| 2 | Paul Brown Stadium | Cincinnati, Ohio | 18,806 | October 10, 2004 | New Zealand | 6–0 | November 5, 2008 | South Korea | 0–0 | 1–0–1 |
| 2 | Heinz Field | Pittsburgh, Pennsylvania | 44,028 | September 29, 2004 | Iceland | 3–0 | August 16, 2015 | Costa Rica | 8–0 | 2–0–0 |
| 2 | Finley Stadium | Chattanooga, Tennessee | 20,535 | November 1, 1997 | Sweden | 3–1 | August 19, 2015 | Costa Rica | 7–2 | 2–0–0 |
| 2 | Alamodome | San Antonio, Texas | 19,109 | October 20, 2013 | Australia | 4–0 | December 10, 2015 | Trinidad and Tobago | 6–0 | 2–0–0 |
| 2 | Georgia Dome | (Georgia (U.S. state)) Atlanta, Georgia | 16,133 | February 13, 2014 | Russia | 8–0 | September 18, 2016 | Netherlands | 3–1 | 2–0–0 |
| 2 | Mercedes-Benz Superdome | New Orleans, Louisiana | 32,950 | December 16, 2015 | China | 0–1 | October 19, 2017 | South Korea | 3–1 | 1–1–0 |
| 2 | Busch Stadium | St. Louis, Missouri | 35,817 | April 4, 2015 | New Zealand | 4–0 | May 16, 2019 | New Zealand | 5–0 | 2–0–0 |
| 2 | DRV PNK Stadium | Ft. Lauderdale, Florida | 16,917 | November 10, 2022 | Germany | 1–2 | December 2, 2023 | China | 3–0 | 1–1–0 |
| 2 | BMO Stadium (Banc of California Stadium) | Los Angeles, California | 20,941 | April 7, 2019 | Belgium | 6–0 | March 3, 2024 | Colombia | 3–0 | 2–0–0 |
| 2 | Energizer Park (City Park) | St. Louis, Missouri | 22,294 | April 11, 2023 | Republic of Ireland | 1–0 | June 3, 2025 | Jamaica | 4-0 | 2–0–0 |
| 1 | Galbreath Field | Cincinnati, Ohio | 1,100 | June 12, 1993 | Canada | 7–0 | | | | 1–0–0 |
| 1 | Mansfield High School | Mansfield, Ohio | 6,120 | June 15, 1993 | Italy | 5–0 | | | | 1–0–0 |
| 1 | Westerville North High School | Westerville, Ohio | Unknown | June 19, 1993 | Italy | 1–0 | | | | 1–0–0 |
| 1 | Pontiac Silverdome | Pontiac, Michigan | 3,572 | June 21, 1993 | Canada | 3–0 | | | | 1–0–0 |
| 1 | Showalter Field | Orlando, Florida | 2,238 | February 24, 1995 | Denmark | 7–0 | | | | 1–0–0 |
| 1 | Franklin Pierce High School | (Washington (state)) Tacoma, Washington | 3,291 | May 12, 1995 | Brazil | 3–0 | | | | 1–0–0 |
| 1 | Franklin Field | Dallas, Texas | 6,145 | May 19, 1995 | Canada | 9–1 | | | | 1–0–0 |
| 1 | Edgewater High School | Orlando, Florida | 2,130 | February 10, 1996 | Denmark | 2–1 | | | | 1–0–0 |
| 1 | Blossom Field | San Antonio, Texas | 2,192 | February 15, 1996 | Sweden | 3–0 | | | | 1–0–0 |
| 1 | Deer Park Stadium | Houston, Texas | 2,865 | February 17, 1996 | Sweden | 3–0 | | | | 1–0–0 |
| 1 | Hatboro-Horsham Senior High School | Horsham, Pennsylvania | 5,112 | May 16, 1996 | Japan | 4–0 | | | | 1–0–0 |
| 1 | Tampa Stadium | Tampa, Florida | 5,500 | July 4, 1996 | Australia | 2–1 | | | | 1–0–0 |
| 1 | Pensacola Soccer Complex | Pensacola, Florida | 5,234 | July 6, 1996 | Australia | 2–1 | | | | 1–0–0 |
| 1 | Orange Bowl | Miami, Florida | 55,560 | July 25, 1996 | China | 0–0 | | | | 0–0–1 |
| 1 | UNCG Soccer Stadium | Greensboro, North Carolina | 3,376 | April 24, 1997 | France | 4–2 | | | | 1–0–0 |
| 1 | Norris Stadium, St. Charles East High School | St. Charles, Illinois | 4,147 | May 4, 1997 | South Korea | 6–1 | | | | 1–0–0 |
| 1 | Upper Dublin High School | Ambler, Pennsylvania | 4,826 | June 5, 1997 | Australia | 9–1 | | | | 1–0–0 |
| 1 | Baylor School | Chattanooga, Tennessee | 0 | October 30, 1997 | Sweden | 3–1 | | | | 1–0–0 |
| 1 | Murray H. Goodman Stadium | Bethlehem, Pennsylvania | 5,811 | May 10, 1998 | Iceland | 1–0 | | | | 1–0–0 |
| 1 | UCLA North Field | Los Angeles, California | 0 | December 16, 1998 | Ukraine | 2–1 | | | | 1–0–0 |
| 1 | Bulldog Stadium | Fresno, California | 5,392 | December 20, 1998 | Ukraine | 5–0 | | | | 1–0–0 |
| 1 | James R. Hallford Stadium (DeKalb Memorial Stadium) | (Georgia (U.S. state)) Clarkston, Georgia | 14,562 | May 2, 1999 | Japan | 7–0 | | | | 1–0–0 |
| 1 | Nike World Headquarters | Beaverton, Oregon | 0 | June 3, 1999 | Australia | 4–0 | | | | 1–0–0 |
| 1 | FedEx Field (Jack Kent Cooke Stadium) | Landover, Maryland | 54,962 | July 1, 1999 | Germany | 3–2 | | | | 1–0–0 |
| 1 | Stanford Stadium | Palo Alto, California | 73,123 | July 4, 1999 | Brazil | 2–0 | | | | 1–0–0 |
| 1 | Mile High Stadium | Denver, Colorado | 25,099 | September 26, 1999 | Brazil | 6–0 | | | | 1–0–0 |
| 1 | Florida Atlantic University | Boca Raton, Florida | 0 | February 9, 2000 | Norway | 1–0 | | | | 0–1–0 |
| 1 | Bethpage Ballpark (EAB Park) | (New York (state)) Central Islip, New York | 6,500 | July 7, 2000 | Italy | 4–1 | | | | 1–0–0 |
| 1 | Navy–Marine Corps Memorial Stadium | Annapolis, Maryland | 21,278 | August 13, 2000 | Russia | 7–4 | | | | 1–0–0 |
| 1 | Maryland Stadium | College Park, Maryland | 0 | August 15, 2000 | Russia | 1–1 | | | | 0–0–1 |
| 1 | Robertson Stadium | Houston, Texas | 11,121 | December 10, 2000 | Mexico | 3–2 | | | | 1–0–0 |
| 1 | Chase Field (Bank One Ballpark) | Phoenix, Arizona | 12,039 | December 17, 2000 | Japan | 1–1 | | | | 0–0–1 |
| 1 | Rice–Eccles Stadium | Salt Lake City, Utah | 19,584 | June 14, 2003 | Republic of Ireland | 5–0 | | | | 1–0–0 |
| 1 | Tad Gormley Stadium | New Orleans, Louisiana | 15,074 | July 13, 2003 | Brazil | 1–0 | | | | 1–0–0 |
| 1 | Cotton Bowl | Dallas, Texas | 23,176 | November 3, 2003 | Mexico | 3–1 | | | | 1–0–0 |
| 1 | NRG Stadium (Reliant Stadium) | Houston, Texas | 16,991 | October 23, 2004 | Republic of Ireland | 5–0 | | | | 1–0–0 |
| 1 | Virginia Beach Sportsplex | Virginia Beach, Virginia | 3,215 | June 26, 2005 | Canada | 2–0 | | | | 1–0–0 |
| 1 | The Dome at America's Center (Edward Jones Dome) | St. Louis, Missouri | 10,861 | October 13, 2007 | Mexico | 5–1 | | | | 1–0–0 |
| 1 | Morrison Stadium | Omaha, Nebraska | 6,439 | July 13, 2010 | Sweden | 1–1 | | | | 0–0–1 |
| 1 | Fifth Third Bank Stadium (Kennesaw State University Stadium) | (Georgia (U.S. state)) Kennesaw, Georgia | 5,759 | October 2, 2010 | China | 2–1 | | | | 1–0–0 |
| 1 | Candlestick Park | San Francisco, California | 16,315 | October 27, 2013 | New Zealand | 4–1 | | | | 1–0–0 |
| 1 | U.S. Bank Stadium | Minneapolis, Minnesota | 23,400 | October 23, 2016 | Switzerland | 5–1 | | | | 1–0–0 |
| 1 | Nippert Stadium | Cincinnati, Ohio | 30,529 | September 19, 2017 | New Zealand | 5–0 | | | | 1–0–0 |
| 1 | Levi's Stadium | Santa Clara, California | 22,788 | May 12, 2019 | South Africa | 3–0 | | | | 1–0–0 |
| 1 | Mercedes-Benz Stadium | (Georgia (U.S. state)) Atlanta, Georgia | 50,644 | April 6, 2024 | Japan | 2–1 | | | | 1–0–0 |
| 1 | Lynn Family Stadium | Louisville, Kentucky | 13,543 (sellout) | October 30, 2024 | Argentina | 3–0 | | | | 1–0–0 |
| 1 | SoFi Stadium | Inglewood, California | 32,303 | April 5, 2025 | Brazil | 2–0 | | | | 1–0–0 |
| 1 | CPKC Stadium | Kansas City, Missouri | 11,044 | October 29, 2025 | New Zealand | 6–0 | | | | 1–0–0 |
| 1 | Chase Stadium | Fort Lauderdale, Florida | 9,471 | December 1, 2025 | Italy | 2–0 | | | | 1–0–0 |
| 1 | Harder Stadium | Santa Barbara, California | 14,797 (sellout) | January 27, 2026 | Chile | 5–0 | | | | 1–0–0 |
