= 2011 FIFA Women's World Cup final =

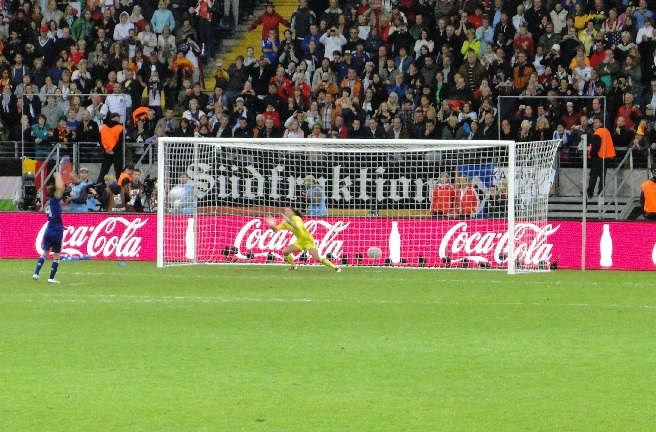
- Saki Kumagai scored the winning penalty
| Japan | United States |
| 2 | 2 |
- After extra time Japan won 3–1 on penalties
- Date: 17 July 2011
- Venue: Waldstadion, Frankfurt
- Player of the Match: Ayumi Kaihori (Japan)
- Referee: Bibiana Steinhaus (Germany)
- Attendance: 48,817
- Weather: Partly cloudy 16 °C (61 °F); 77% humidity

The 2011 FIFA Women's World Cup final was an association football match that took place on 17 July 2011 at Commerzbank-Arena, in Frankfurt, Germany, to determine the winner of 2011 FIFA Women's World Cup. It was played between Japan and the United States. Japan won 3–1 in a penalty shoot-out following a 2–2 draw after extra time, becoming the first Asian team to win a senior—either men's or women's—World Cup final. Japan's victory was a major upset, made even more meaningful for the country as it was still feeling the effects of the 2011 Tōhoku earthquake and tsunami that killed more than 15,000 people prior to the tournament.

The 2011 final was the last major sporting event to be broadcast in Japan prior to the country's digital switchover that took place on 24 July 2011.

== Background ==
The match was between the United States, which had been a major power in women's association football since winning the inaugural World Cup, and Japan, which had never won a major world title, or indeed even reached the final of a major world competition. This was also the first appearance of the United States in the final after 12 years. The United States was bidding to become the first team to win a third World Cup, having won in 1991 and 1999. Japan was bidding to become the fourth team to win the World Cup, joining the United States, Norway and Germany. Before the beginning of the competition, the Japanese side had almost pulled out from the competition due to the disastrous earthquake that happened back in their home country, as the women's league in Japan was suspended and eventually cancelled.

The match was the third between the two teams in World Cup play. The United States beat Japan 3–0 in pool play in 1991, and won 4–0 in a 1995 quarterfinal match. Going into the final, the United States had never lost to Japan, with 22 wins and 3 draws. Prior to the World Cup, the United States was the top-ranked team in the FIFA Women's World Rankings, while Japan was ranked fourth. Despite being ranked fourth, very few people expected Japan to reach the semi-finals, let alone win the tournament.

With both Japan and the United States losing a match in pool play, this marked the first time that a team won the World Cup having done so.

Japan became only the second Asian national team to reach the FIFA Women's World Cup final, following China's final appearance against the United States in 1999. This was also only the second final not involving a European team.

== Route to the final ==
Japan
Round
United States
Opponent
Result
Group stage
Opponent
Result
New Zealand
2–1
Match 1
North Korea
2–0
Mexico
4–0
Match 2
Colombia
3–0
England
0–2
Match 3
Sweden
1–2

| Pos | Team | Pld | Pts |
|---|---|---|---|
| 1 | England | 3 | 7 |
| 2 | Japan | 3 | 6 |
| 3 | Mexico | 3 | 2 |
| 4 | New Zealand | 3 | 1 |

Source: FIFA
Final standing

| Pos | Team | Pld | Pts |
|---|---|---|---|
| 1 | Sweden | 3 | 9 |
| 2 | United States | 3 | 6 |
| 3 | North Korea | 3 | 1 |
| 4 | Colombia | 3 | 1 |

Source: FIFA
Opponent
Result
Knockout stage
Opponent
Result
Germany
1–0 (a.e.t.)
Quarter-finals
Brazil
2–2 (a.e.t.) (5–3 pen.)
Sweden
3–1
Semi-finals
France
3–1

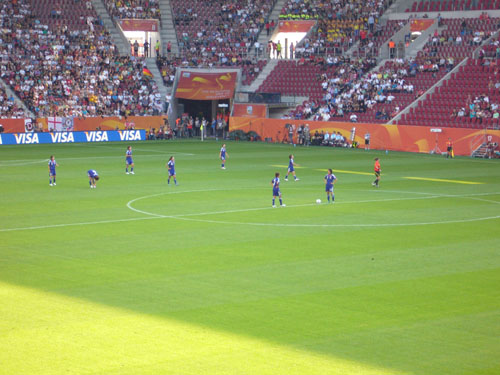
Japan's group stage match against England at Impuls Arena

Despite being ranked 1st in the world by FIFA, the United States was the final team to qualify for the 2011 World Cup. After finishing third in the 2010 CONCACAF Women's Gold Cup, which serves as the CONCACAF qualifier, the United States was forced to defeat Italy in a Home and Away playoff. Japan, ranked 4th, qualified for the tournament by finishing third in the 2010 AFC Women's Asian Cup, which served as the AFC qualifier.

Once at the finals, the United States reached the knockout stage by finishing second in Group C behind Sweden, the only team they lost to in group play. They advanced through the quarterfinals on a penalty shootout with Brazil, in which the United States footballer Abby Wambach scored an equalizer in the 122nd minute of the game – in stoppage time, the latest goal ever scored in Women's World Cup play, – to tie the game 2–2 and bring the game into a penalty shootout. The United States then defeated France 3–1 to reach the final.

Japan reached the knockout stage by finishing second in Group B behind England, which was the only team to defeat Japan in group play. Japan then stunned the host nation, two-time defending champions Germany, 1–0 in extra time. They then defeated Sweden 3–1 to reach the final match.

== Match ==
=== Summary ===
The Americans, the pre-game favorites to win, began strongly and pressured the Japanese for the first 20 minutes. However neither Carli Lloyd, Megan Rapinoe nor Abby Wambach managed to score to take an early lead. In 22', Shinobu Ohno gave Japan its first strike, but to no avail. In 28', Wambach's had a strike hit the bar. The Japanese had a chance in 30' but Ohno's breakthrough was denied by Hope Solo. The Americans resumed pressure and in 44', Christie Rampone almost cleared the Japanese line but was blocked; the Japanese launched an unsuccessful counterattack, ending the first half goalless. Japan had higher possession than the U.S. despite being mostly on the defensive.

The second half also began with American domination. Alex Morgan had a golden chance in 49', as Heather O'Reilly drove a low cross towards the near post which Morgan shot towards the net, beating Japanese keeper Ayumi Kaihori but was denied by the post. Kozue Ando and Ohno made the American defenders hustle from 54' to 56' before Aya Sameshima's corner kick was cleared. In 60', the Japanese almost got a chance to score when Yukari Kinga thrashed Sawa's excellent lofted through pass over the bar. In 69', Alex Morgan reacted first to a deep ball from Rapinoe, held off a challenge from Kumagai before drilling a low left-footed shot past Kaihori to give the U.S. a major breakthrough, giving the U.S. a 1–0 lead. The Japanese side regrouped and attacked the U.S., but Rampone's good defending management proved hard to break. However, in 81', as the U.S. attempted to counterattack, they were caught off guard by quick Japanese response, and while Ali Krieger have cleared the first chance, a mis-touch by Rachel Buehler provided Aya Miyama a golden chance, and she didn't miss it to level 1–1 for Japan. The U.S. attacked hard for the remaining time, but there was no goal to come as the two sides settled 1–1 after 90 minutes.

Extra-time began with Japan enjoying better possession as usual, though they still maintained a defensive approach to fight against strong American attacks. In 104', when it appeared that they would end the first half of extra-time with no goal, Wambach's powerful header from the centre of the area off of Morgan's excellent pass gave the U.S. a 2–1 lead. With the second half of extra-time started, the Japanese looked exhausted and the U.S. appeared to have an advantage. However, mistakes by American defenders allowed Miyama and Homare Sawa to make direct threats, though there was no goal. But in 117', Japan received a corner kick; Miyama sent a low ball to Sawa, who ran towards the near post, made the corner before any U.S. defender and poked the ball over Solo to level it again. The result was kept til the end of extra-time even after Azusa Iwashimizu received a red card, sending the game to a penalty shoot-out.

For the United States, Shannon Boxx, Lloyd, and Tobin Heath missed three straight kicks, while only Yūki Nagasato missed the net out of Japan's first three attempts. Wambach tried to salvage it with a goal, but it went in vain when Saki Kumagai scored the decisive penalty to give Japan the World Cup trophy for the first time.

=== Details ===
17 July 2011
20:45 CEST

| Japan | 2–2 (a.e.t.) | United States |
|---|---|---|
| Miyama 81'; Sawa 117' | Report | Morgan 69'; Wambach 104' |
Penalties
| Miyama (penalty scored); Nagasato (penalty missed); Sakaguchi (penalty scored); Kumagai (penalty scored) | 3–1 | (penalty missed) Boxx; (penalty missed) Lloyd; (penalty missed) Heath; (penalty scored) Wambach |

Waldstadion, Frankfurt
Attendance: 48,817
Referee: Bibiana Steinhaus (Germany)

| Japan | United States |

| GK | 21 | Ayumi Kaihori |
| RB | 2 | Yukari Kinga |
| CB | 3 | Azusa Iwashimizu | (red card) 120+1' |
| CB | 4 | Saki Kumagai |
| LB | 15 | Aya Sameshima |
| CM | 6 | Mizuho Sakaguchi |
| CM | 10 | Homare Sawa (c) |
| RW | 11 | Shinobu Ohno | | (substituted off) 66' |
| AM | 8 | Aya Miyama | (yellow card) 97' |
| LW | 9 | Nahomi Kawasumi |
| CF | 7 | Kozue Ando | | (substituted off) 66' |
Substitutions:
| FW | 18 | Karina Maruyama | | (substituted on) 66' | (substituted off) 119' |
| FW | 17 | Yūki Nagasato | | (substituted on) 66' |
| FW | 20 | Mana Iwabuchi | | | (substituted on) 119' |
Manager:
Norio Sasaki

| GK | 1 | Hope Solo |
| RB | 11 | Ali Krieger |
| CB | 19 | Rachel Buehler |
| CB | 3 | Christie Rampone (c) |
| LB | 6 | Amy LePeilbet |
| RM | 9 | Heather O'Reilly |
| CM | 10 | Carli Lloyd |
| CM | 7 | Shannon Boxx |
| LM | 15 | Megan Rapinoe | (substituted off) 114' |
| SS | 12 | Lauren Cheney | (substituted off) 46' |
| CF | 20 | Abby Wambach |
Substitutions:
| FW | 13 | Alex Morgan | (substituted on) 46' |
| MF | 17 | Tobin Heath | (substituted on) 114' |
Manager:
(Sweden) Pia Sundhage

Player of the Match:
Ayumi Kaihori (Japan)

Assistant referees:
Marina Wozniak (Germany)
Katrin Rafalski (Germany)
Fourth official:
Jenny Palmqvist (Sweden)

=== Statistics ===
Overall
| Statistic | Japan | United States |
|---|---|---|
| Goals scored | 2 | 2 |
| Total shots | 14 | 27 |
| Shots on target | 6 | 5 |
| Ball possession | 52% | 48% |
| Corner kicks | 4 | 8 |
| Fouls committed | 11 | 10 |
| Offsides | 2 | 3 |
| Yellow cards | 1 | 0 |
| Red cards | 1 | 0 |

== Reaction and impact ==
The outcome of the game was so unbelievable that it caused widespread celebration in Japan as the country had just suffered the devastating March earthquake that demoralized the country. The Japanese side received international acclaim for becoming world champions from the background of a catastrophic natural disaster and poor conditions prior to the tournament, as well as referring to Japan's journey as a "fairytale", noting how the Japanese side came off a natural disaster crisis, lacked any sufficient support from the JFA as women's football wasn't the top priority of Japan's football development and had almost pulled out from the tournament owing to the disaster at home. Miho Kajioka, a football fan from Tokyo summed it up "We haven't had a single piece of good news for the past four months. It's as if we had nothing to be hopeful about, so in that sense the result is great. It's incredible."

Tony DiCicco, manager of the victorious American side in the 1999 FIFA Women's World Cup and a commentator in ESPN at the time, expressed the shocking outcome, “They feel they can win. That's almost never been the case before.” Aya Sameshima, who was part of the Japanese side in 2011, expressed that determination was the reason for Japan to overcome the adverse situations.

Following the end of the game, the Japanese raised "thank you" banner to thank for international support to Japan in the difficult time, and was applauded by the majority of fans.

Japanese wheelchair basketball player Akira Toyoshima literally took inspiration to pursue his career from footballer Aya Sameshima who coincidentally happened to be one of Akira Toyoshima's colleagues while working at the Fukushima Daiichi Nuclear Power Plant and the playing style of Sameshima inspired Toyoshima to remain upbeat and play to his potential despite the latter being struck in the negative mindset following the aftermath of the 2011 tsunami. He revealed that he was working as an accountant at the Fukushima Daiichi Nuclear Power Plant when the 2011 Tōhoku earthquake and tsunami struck Japan and the tsunami eventually claimed the lives of thousands of people. Toyoshima insisted that he was focused on organizing a set of important and urgent documents in the main office building of the Fukushima Daiichi Nuclear Power Plant as a member of the accounting team.

== See also ==
- 2007 AFC Asian Cup final, which Iraq won the tournament despite significant adverse situations (Iraq War) at home
- Japan–United States women's soccer rivalry
- Japan at the FIFA Women's World Cup
- United States at the FIFA Women's World Cup
