= Women's World Invitational Tournament =

- Founded: 1978; 48 years ago
- Abolished: 1987
- Region: International
- Last champions: Taiwan WNFT (1st title)
- Most championships: (West Germany) Bergisch Gladbach (2 titles)

The Women's World Invitation Tournament (Chinese: 世界女子足球邀請賽), also known as the Chunghua Cup (Chinese: 中華盃), was a triennial global invitational tournament for national and club teams in women's association football. It was held four times, in Taipei, Taiwan.

== History ==
It was one of the most prestigious women's football events, prior to the advent of the Women's World Cup and Women's Olympic Football. The competitions were organised by the Chinese Taipei Football Association and their success brought pressure on the global governing body FIFA to organise its own women's football tournaments.

SSG Bergisch Gladbach of West Germany was the most successful participant, with two titles. They signed Taiwan's Chou Tai-ying after the 1987 tournament.

== Results ==
Year	Champions	Second	Third	Fourth	Teams
1978	(France) Reims FF & (Finland) HJK Helsinki		Taiwan WNFT	(United States) Sting SC	13
1981	(West Germany) Bergisch Gladbach	New Zealand	Taiwan WNFT	(Norway) IL i BUL	14
1984	(West Germany) Bergisch Gladbach	Taiwan Team A	Taiwan Team B	New Zealand	11
1987	Taiwan WNFT	United States	(West Germany) Bergisch Gladbach	New Zealand	10
