= 2022 Women's Africa Cup of Nations squads =

List of players competing at the 14th edition of the Women's Africa Cup of Nations

This article lists the squads for the 2022 Women's Africa Cup of Nations, the 14th edition of the Women's Africa Cup of Nations, a biennial women's international football tournament for national teams in Africa, organised by the Confederation of African Football and held in Morocco from 2 to 23 July 2022. Due to the impact of the COVID-19 pandemic in Africa, each national team registered a squad of 26 players.

The age listed for each player is on 2 July 2022, the first day of the tournament. The numbers of caps and goals listed for each player do not include any matches played after the start of tournament. The club listed is the club for which the player last played a competitive match prior to the tournament. The nationality for each club reflects the national association (not the league) to which the club is affiliated. A flag is included for coaches that are of a different nationality than their own national team.

== Group A ==
=== Burkina Faso ===
The squad was announced on 27 June 2022. Djamila Derra withdrew from the squad and was replaced by Chantal Zongo.

Head coach: Pascal Sawadogo

No.	Pos.	Player	Date of birth (age)	Club
1	GK	Aminata Korogo	28 October 1999 (aged 22)	(Burkinabé Football Federation) ASO
2	DF	Madina Traoré	16 August 2001 (aged 20)	(Burkinabé Football Federation) Etincelles
3	DF	Assanatou Nako	27 April 1998 (aged 24)	(Burkinabé Football Federation) USFA
4	DF	Jacqueline Sédogo	25 July 2002 (aged 19)	(Burkinabé Football Federation) Sparks
5	DF	Rabiatou Koudougou	20 April 2004 (aged 18)	(Burkinabé Football Federation) RC Bobo Dioulasso
6	MF	Adama Congo	11 April 2004 (aged 18)	(Burkinabé Football Federation) Etincelles
7	FW	Mouniratou Compaoré	26 November 1997 (aged 24)	(Burkinabé Football Federation) USFA
8	MF	Fadiratou Tarnagda	14 September 1998 (aged 23)	(Burkinabé Football Federation) ASO
9	FW	Alimata Bélem	2 September 2004 (aged 17)	(Burkinabé Football Federation) ASO
10	MF	Rasmata Sawadogo	1 January 2003 (aged 19)	(Burkinabé Football Federation) USFA
11	FW	Balkissa Sawadogo	2 October 1998 (aged 23)	(Burkinabé Football Federation) USFA
12	DF	Charlotte Millogo (captain)	14 July 1998 (aged 23)	(Burkinabé Football Federation) USFA
13	DF	Diamilatou Zongo	21 June 2001 (aged 21)	(Burkinabé Football Federation) RC Bobo Dioulasso
14	DF	Madina Rouamba	1 December 2001 (aged 20)	(Burkinabé Football Federation) Etincelles
15	MF	Adèle Kabré	30 December 2004 (aged 17)	(Burkinabé Football Federation) Sparks
16	GK	Mariam Ouattara	31 March 2003 (aged 19)	(Burkinabé Football Federation) USFA
17	FW	Limata Nikiéma	7 June 1995 (aged 27)	(Royal Moroccan Football Federation) Hassania Agadir
18	MF	Juliette Nana	16 August 2000 (aged 21)	(Football Federation of Belarus) Neman
19	FW	Habibou Ouédraogo	18 February 2002 (aged 20)	(Burkinabé Football Federation) Danta AC
20	FW	Justine Zongo	31 December 1998 (aged 23)	(Burkinabé Football Federation) Etincelles
21	MF	Mounifatou Helby	20 November 2005 (aged 16)	(Burkinabé Football Federation) ASO
22	DF	Chantal Zongo	25 November 1997 (aged 24)	(Burkinabé Football Federation) ASO
23	GK	Ami Sanou	31 December 1989 (aged 32)	(Burkinabé Football Federation) Etincelles
24	DF	Stéphanie Sow	2 November 1995 (aged 26)	(Burkinabé Football Federation) USFA
25	DF	Haïmata Nacoulma	27 February 2001 (aged 21)	(Burkinabé Football Federation) ASO
26	MF	Félicité Kafando	17 June 1996 (aged 26)	(Burkinabé Football Federation) Sparks

=== Morocco ===
The squad was announced on 1 July 2022.

Head coach: (France) Reynald Pedros

No.	Pos.	Player	Date of birth (age)	Club
1	GK	Khadija Er-Rmichi	16 September 1989 (aged 32)	(Royal Moroccan Football Federation) AS FAR
2	DF	Zineb Redouani	12 June 2000 (aged 22)	(Royal Moroccan Football Federation) AS FAR
3	DF	Fatima Dahmos	5 August 1992 (aged 29)	(Royal Moroccan Football Federation) AS FAR
4	DF	Siham Boukhami	1 February 1992 (aged 30)	(Royal Moroccan Football Federation) AS FAR
5	DF	Nesryne El Chad	13 March 2003 (aged 19)	(French Football Federation) Saint-Étienne
6	MF	Élodie Nakkach	20 January 1995 (aged 27)	(Swiss Football Association) Servette
7	FW	Ghizlane Chebbak (captain)	19 February 1991 (aged 31)	(Royal Moroccan Football Federation) AS FAR
8	MF	Salma Amani	28 November 1989 (aged 32)	(French Football Federation) Saint-Malo
9	FW	Ibtissam Jraïdi	9 December 1992 (aged 29)	(Royal Moroccan Football Federation) AS FAR
10	MF	Najat Badri	19 May 1988 (aged 34)	(Royal Moroccan Football Federation) AS FAR
11	MF	Fatima Tagnaout	20 January 1999 (aged 23)	(Royal Moroccan Football Federation) AS FAR
12	GK	Assia Zouhair	30 April 1991 (aged 31)	(Royal Moroccan Football Federation) SCC Mohammédia
13	DF	Sabah Seghir	27 September 2000 (aged 21)	(Italian Football Federation) Sampdoria
14	DF	Aziza Rabbah	4 July 1986 (aged 35)	(Royal Moroccan Football Federation) AS FAR
15	DF	Ghizlane Chhiri	11 September 1994 (aged 27)	(Royal Moroccan Football Federation) AS FAR
16	FW	Samya Hassani	3 January 2000 (aged 22)	(Royal Belgian Football Association) Genk
17	FW	Hanane Aït El Haj	2 November 1994 (aged 27)	(Royal Moroccan Football Federation) AS FAR
18	FW	Sanaâ Mssoudy	30 December 1999 (aged 22)	(Royal Moroccan Football Federation) AS FAR
19	DF	Éva Allice	2 January 2002 (aged 20)	(French Football Federation) Montauban
20	MF	Imane Saoud	6 June 2002 (aged 20)	(Swiss Football Association) Basel
21	MF	Yasmin Mrabet	8 August 1999 (aged 22)	(Royal Spanish Football Federation) Levante Las Planas
22	GK	Hind Hasnaoui	13 September 1996 (aged 25)	(Royal Moroccan Football Federation) AS FAR
23	FW	Rosella Ayane	16 March 1996 (aged 26)	(The Football Association) Tottenham Hotspur
24	MF	Sofia Bouftini	25 January 2002 (aged 20)	(Royal Moroccan Football Federation) AS FAR
25	FW	Chaymaa Mourtaji	8 December 1995 (aged 26)	(Royal Moroccan Football Federation) Sporting Casablanca
26	GK	Imane Abdelahad	21 July 1994 (aged 27)	(Royal Moroccan Football Federation) Sporting Casablanca

=== Senegal ===
The squad was announced on 24 June 2022.

Head coach: Mame Moussa Cissé

No.	Pos.	Player	Date of birth (age)	Caps	Goals	Club
1	GK	Thiaba Gueye Séné	14 March 1993 (aged 29)	0	0	(Senegalese Football Federation) Aigles de la Médina
2	DF	Marième Babou	13 April 2003 (aged 19)			(Senegalese Football Federation) US Parcelles Assainie
3	DF	Anta Dembele	15 June 1994 (aged 28)	5	0	(Senegalese Football Federation) US Parcelles Assainie
4	DF	Mame Diarra Diouf	6 August 1994 (aged 27)	2	0	(Senegalese Football Federation) US Parcelles Assainie
5	DF	Ndèye Ndiaye Kané	1 June 1995 (aged 27)	2	0	(Senegalese Football Federation) Sirènes de Grand Yoff
6	MF	Edmée Diagne	1 May 1998 (aged 24)	4	0	(Senegalese Football Federation) Lycée Ameth Fall
7	FW	Mama Diop	9 October 1994 (aged 27)	4	3	(French Football Federation) Lens
8	DF	Mbayang Sow	21 January 1993 (aged 29)	3	0	(Senegalese Football Federation) US Parcelles Assainie
9	FW	Nguenar Ndiaye	10 January 1995 (aged 27)	4	7	(French Football Federation) Bourges
10	FW	Ndeye Awa Diakhaté	2 January 1997 (aged 25)	4	2	(French Football Federation) Le Puy
11	FW	Haby Baldé	1 January 2000 (aged 22)	4	0	(Senegalese Football Federation) US Parcelles Assainie
12	MF	Safiétou Sagna (captain)	11 April 1994 (aged 28)	4	0	(French Football Federation) Bourges
13	MF	Jeannette Sagna	4 August 1999 (aged 22)	5	0	(Senegalese Football Federation) Dakar Sacré-Cœur
14	DF	Salimata Ndiaye	17 February 1995 (aged 27)	5	0	(Senegalese Football Federation) Lycée Ameth Fall
15	MF	Jeanne Niang	5 February 1998 (aged 24)	2	0	(Senegalese Football Federation) Aigles de la Médina
16	GK	Ndeye Meïssa Diaw	10 December 1994 (aged 27)	5	0	(Senegalese Football Federation) Lycée Ameth Fall
17	FW	Hapsatou Malado Diallo	14 April 2005 (aged 17)	1	0	(Senegalese Football Federation) US Parcelles Assainie
18	DF	Meta Camara	14 August 1997 (aged 24)	4	0	(French Football Federation) Bourges
19	MF	Bineta Korkel Seck	11 January 1998 (aged 24)	0	0	(Senegalese Football Federation) Dakar Sacré-Cœur
20	MF	Korka Fall	19 February 1990 (aged 32)	4	0	(Senegalese Football Federation) Aigles de la Médina
21	GK	Tenning Séne	21 January 1990 (aged 32)	0	0	(Senegalese Football Federation) Sirènes de Grand Yoff
22	FW	Gladys Irène Dacosta	21 September 1995 (aged 26)	1	0	(Senegalese Football Federation) US Parcelles Assainie
23	FW	Astou Ngom	6 March 1994 (aged 28)	1	1	(French Football Federation) Cherbourg
24	FW	Coumba Sylla Mbodji	26 August 2003 (aged 18)			(Senegalese Football Federation) Dorades de Mbour
25	MF	Pascaline Bassène	22 October 2002 (aged 19)			(Senegalese Football Federation) US Parcelles Assainie
26	DF	Astou Sy	11 December 1986 (aged 35)			(Senegalese Football Federation) Dakar Sacré-Cœur

=== Uganda ===
The squad was announced on 21 June 2022.

Head coach: George Lutalo

No.	Pos.	Player	Date of birth (age)	Club
1	GK	Ruth Aturo (captain)	19 July 1995 (aged 26)	(Football Association of Finland) Kotkan Työväen Palloilijat
2	DF	Asia Nakibuuka	28 December 2002 (aged 19)	(Federation of Uganda Football Associations) Kawempe Muslims
3	DF	Sumaya Komuntale	3 August 2003 (aged 18)	(Federation of Uganda Football Associations) Tooro Queens
4	DF	Yudaya Nakayenze	26 June 1997 (aged 25)	(United States Soccer Federation) Lindsey Wilson Blue Raiders
5	DF	Aisha Nantongo	6 April 2002 (aged 20)	(Federation of Uganda Football Associations) Kawempe Muslims
6	DF	Margret Namirimu	9 September 1997 (aged 24)	(Federation of Uganda Football Associations) She Corporate
7	FW	Violah Nambi	24 July 1995 (aged 26)	(Austrian Football Association) Dornbirn
8	FW	Sandra Nabweteme	1 November 1996 (aged 25)	(Football Association of Iceland) FH
9	FW	Fazila Ikwaput	15 September 1995 (aged 26)	(Federation of Uganda Football Associations) Lady Doves
10	MF	Hasifah Nassuna	16 February 1998 (aged 24)	(Federation of Uganda Football Associations) UCU Lady Cardinals
11	FW	Ritah Kivumbi	21 June 1995 (aged 27)	(Swedish Football Association) Mallbackens
12	MF	Joan Nabirye	1 July 1993 (aged 29)	(Football Kenya Federation) Vihiga Queens
13	FW	Fauzia Najjemba	7 October 2003 (aged 18)	(Kazakhstan Football Federation) BIIK Kazygurt
14	FW	Joanitah Ainembabazi	3 March 1999 (aged 23)	(Federation of Uganda Football Associations) Rines SS
15	MF	Sheebah Zalwango	10 October 2000 (aged 21)	(Congolese Association Football Federation) FC Amani
16	MF	Phiona Nabbumba	20 July 2000 (aged 21)	(Federation of Uganda Football Associations) She Corporate
17	MF	Riticia Nabbosa	9 October 1997 (aged 24)	(Federation of Uganda Football Associations) Lady Doves
18	GK	Vanessa Karungi	8 November 1999 (aged 22)	(Danish Football Association) B.93
19	GK	Daisy Nakaziro	22 September 1997 (aged 24)	(Federation of Uganda Football Associations) Uganda Martyrs Lubaga
20	FW	Lillian Mutuuzo	22 December 2002 (aged 19)	(Federation of Uganda Football Associations) Kampala Queens
21	MF	Shamirah Nalugya	12 September 2003 (aged 18)	(Federation of Uganda Football Associations) Kampala Queens
22	DF	Biira Nadunga	18 February 2003 (aged 19)	(Federation of Uganda Football Associations) Olila High School
23	DF	Lukiya Namubiru	17 December 1998 (aged 23)	(Federation of Uganda Football Associations) Kampala Queens
24	FW	Margret Kunihira	9 September 2004 (aged 17)	(Federation of Uganda Football Associations) Kampala Queens
25	FW	Zaina Nandede	15 October 2003 (aged 18)	(Federation of Uganda Football Associations) Kampala Queens
26	MF	Tracy Akiror	25 August 1997 (aged 24)	(United States Soccer Federation) AFC Ann Arbor

== Group B ==
=== Cameroon ===
The squad was announced on 20 June 2022.

Head coach: Gabriel Zabo

No.	Pos.	Player	Date of birth (age)	Club
1	GK	Pauline Ayangma	6 August 1992 (aged 29)	(Cameroonian Football Federation) Ebolowa FC
2	DF	Easther Mayi Kith	28 March 1997 (aged 25)	(French Football Federation) Reims
3	FW	Ajara Nchout	12 January 1993 (aged 29)	(Italian Football Federation) Inter Milan
4	DF	Catherine Mbengono	8 September 1996 (aged 25)	(Kazakhstan Football Federation) Okzhetpes
5	DF	Annecy Nguiadem	4 April 1994 (aged 28)	(Kazakhstan Football Federation) Okzhetpes
6	DF	Estelle Johnson	21 July 1988 (aged 33)	(United States Soccer Federation) Gotham FC
7	FW	Gabrielle Onguéné (captain)	25 February 1989 (aged 33)	(Russian Football Union) CSKA Moscow
8	MF	Fadimatou Kome	22 July 2002 (aged 19)	(French Football Federation) Soyaux
9	FW	Flora Kameni	13 November 2001 (aged 20)	(Cameroonian Football Federation) Louves Minproff
10	MF	Jeannette Yango	12 June 1993 (aged 29)	(French Football Federation) Fleury
11	DF	Aurelle Awona	2 February 1993 (aged 29)	(Italian Football Federation) Napoli
12	DF	Claudine Meffometou	1 July 1990 (aged 32)	(French Football Federation) Fleury
13	FW	Rose Bella	5 May 1994 (aged 28)	(Turkish Football Federation) Trabzonspor
14	MF	Monique Ngock	17 September 2004 (aged 17)	(Cameroonian Football Federation) Eclair de Saa
15	DF	Colette Ndzana	19 July 2000 (aged 21)	(Football Federation of Belarus) Dinamo Minsk
16	GK	Ange Bawou	12 February 2000 (aged 22)	(Nigeria Football Federation) Bayelsa Queens
17	MF	Brigitte Omboudou	29 July 1992 (aged 29)	(Nigeria Football Federation) Rivers Angels
18	MF	Claudia Dabda	1 July 2001 (aged 21)	(Football Federation of Belarus) Dinamo Minsk
19	FW	Tatiana Ewodo Ekogo	9 February 1997 (aged 25)	(Russian Football Union) Yenisey Krasnoyarsk
20	MF	Genevieve Ngo Mbeleck	10 March 1993 (aged 29)	(Israel Football Association) Kiryat Gat
21	DF	Eliane Bodolo	3 July 1991 (aged 30)	(Royal Spanish Football Federation) Juan Grande
22	MF	Michaela Abam	12 June 1997 (aged 25)	(United States Soccer Federation) Houston Dash
23	GK	Flore Enyegue	9 July 1991 (aged 30)	(Cameroonian Football Federation) Canon Yaoundé
24	FW	Kévine Ossol	19 August 2000 (aged 21)	(Cameroonian Football Federation) AS Awa
25	DF	Ousmanou Doudou	26 January 1996 (aged 26)	(Cameroonian Football Federation) Amazone Fap
26	FW	Diane Wabeua	9 June 2003 (aged 19)	(Turkish Football Federation) Trabzonspor

=== Togo ===
The squad was announced on 23 June 2022.

Head coach: Kaï Tomety

No.	Pos.	Player	Date of birth (age)	Club
1	GK	Kafui Bagnim	2 May 1991 (aged 31)	(French Football Federation) Racing Club de Saint-Denis
2	DF	Essowè Dowatanti	23 January 1997 (aged 25)	(Togolese Football Federation) Gazelles
3	MF	Riféla Dogli	25 July 1997 (aged 24)	(Togolese Football Federation) Amis du Monde
4	DF	Ella Djankalé	19 February 1989 (aged 33)	(Togolese Football Federation) Amis du Monde
5	DF	Ayawoa Kaglan	31 December 1998 (aged 23)	(Togolese Football Federation) Tempête FC
6	MF	Reine Gake	31 December 2002 (aged 19)	(Togolese Football Federation) Ahe FC
7	MF	Takiyatou Yaya	3 April 2002 (aged 20)	(Turkish Football Federation) İlkadım Belediyesi
8	MF	Odette Gnintegma	22 April 1999 (aged 23)	(Royal Moroccan Football Federation) Raja Ain Harrouda
9	FW	Amiratou N'djambara	10 April 1999 (aged 23)	(Royal Moroccan Football Federation) Raja Ain Harrouda
10	FW	Moussouriéto Adinda-Apko	31 January 1996 (aged 26)	(Ghana Football Association) Soccer Intellectuals FC
11	FW	Mafille Woedikou	15 July 1994 (aged 27)	(French Football Federation) Yzeure
12	MF	Nathalie Badate (captain)	28 August 1991 (aged 30)	(French Football Federation) Tarascon
13	MF	Koudjoukalo Sama	15 September 1996 (aged 25)	(Togolese Football Federation) Amis du Monde
14	DF	Akoko Assigno	8 March 2002 (aged 20)	(Togolese Football Federation) Athlèta
15	DF	Dédé Houndjo-Tete	12 March 1986 (aged 36)	(Togolese Football Federation) Athlèta
16	GK	Amé Amouklou	31 December 1987 (aged 34)	(Togolese Football Federation) Amis du Monde
17	DF	Akossiwa Dogbe	18 April 1993 (aged 29)	(Togolese Football Federation) Athlèta
18	MF	Adjo Ayawo	1 April 1985 (aged 37)	(Togolese Football Federation) Athlèta
19	DF	Yawa Konou	6 November 1986 (aged 35)	(Togolese Football Federation) Amis du Monde
20	FW	Bendukilou Manou	20 June 1990 (aged 32)	(Togolese Football Federation) Athlèta
21	MF	Solim Kadanga	1 April 1998 (aged 24)	(Togolese Football Federation) Gazelles FC
22	MF	Fatima Salou	25 December 2000 (aged 21)	(Togolese Football Federation) Amis du Monde
23	GK	Adjo Hatto	31 December 2001 (aged 20)	(Togolese Football Federation) Ahé FC
24	DF	Afigan Gagban	17 January 1997 (aged 25)	(Togolese Football Federation) Athlèta
25	FW	Lucie Gantim	31 December 2000 (aged 21)	(Togolese Football Federation) Tempête
26	FW	Tayla Gace	13 February 1998 (aged 24)	(French Football Federation) Auxerre

=== Tunisia ===
The squad was announced on 22 June 2022. Neila Chemkhi, Eya Bellaaj, and Meriem Sassi were named in the squad list sent to CAF, but did not travel with the squad due to the Tunisian Football Federation being unwilling to pay for the extra players.

Head coach: Samir Landolsi

No.	Pos.	Player	Date of birth (age)	Club
1	GK	Nesrine Zizi	30 August 1992 (aged 29)	(Tunisian Football Federation) AS Banque de l'Habitat
2	DF	Dhekra Mahfoudh	23 May 1992 (aged 30)	(Tunisian Football Federation) ASF Sbiba
3	DF	Aya Gazahi	26 February 2002 (aged 20)	(French Football Federation) AS Saint Martin
4	DF	Chaima Abbassi (captain)	4 June 1993 (aged 29)	(Tunisian Football Federation) AS Banque de l'Habitat
5	DF	Jasmina Barhoumi	8 September 2002 (aged 19)	(German Football Association) 1. FFC Niederkirchen
6	DF	Rania Aouina	5 May 1994 (aged 28)	(French Football Federation) Thonon Évian
7	FW	Ella Kaabachi	15 May 1992 (aged 30)	(French Football Federation) Soyaux
8	MF	Sabrine Mamay	17 February 1991 (aged 31)	(United Arab Emirates Football Association) Al Ain
9	FW	Sabrine Ellouzi	28 June 1997 (aged 25)	(Royal Dutch Football Association) Feyenoord
10	FW	Meriem Houij	8 August 1994 (aged 27)	(Turkish Football Federation) ALG Spor
11	FW	Imen Mchara	15 February 1995 (aged 27)	(Tunisian Football Federation) ASF Sahel
12	MF	Ibtissem Ben Mohamed	1 July 1997 (aged 25)	(Tunisian Football Federation) AS Banque de l'Habitat
13	MF	Yasmine Jemai	12 June 1999 (aged 23)	(Turkish Football Federation) Fatih Vatan Spor
14	DF	Ghada Ayadi	10 August 1992 (aged 29)	(Jordan Football Association) Amman
15	FW	Hanna Hamdi	26 November 1995 (aged 26)	(German Football Association) VfR Warbeyen
16	GK	Soulaima Jabrani	25 February 1997 (aged 25)	(Turkish Football Federation) Fatih Vatan Spor
17	MF	Imen Troudi	29 March 1989 (aged 33)	(United Arab Emirates Football Association) Abu Dhabi Country Club
18	DF	Samia Aouni	30 May 1992 (aged 30)	(Jordan Football Association) Amman
19	MF	Chirine Lamti	13 September 1994 (aged 27)	(Football Association of the Czech Republic) Slavia Prague
20	FW	Leïla Maknoun	19 January 1992 (aged 30)	(Italian Football Federation) Apulia Trani
21	MF	Soumaya Laamiri	8 September 1995 (aged 26)	(Tunisian Football Federation) AS Banque de l'Habitat
22	GK	Najla Harrathi	20 November 2001 (aged 20)	(Tunisian Football Federation) ASF Bou Hajla
23	MF	Yasmine Klai	15 September 2002 (aged 19)	(French Football Federation) Lyon Youth

=== Zambia ===
The squad was announced on 10 June 2022. Barbra Banda withdrew from the squad for medical reasons, which was rumoured to be high levels of testosterone.

Head coach: Bruce Mwape

No.	Pos.	Player	Date of birth (age)	Club
1	GK	Catherine Musonda	20 February 1998 (aged 24)	(Football Association of Zambia) Indeni Roses
2	DF	Judith Soko	31 March 2004 (aged 18)	(Football Association of Zambia) Green Buffaloes
3	DF	Lushomo Mweemba	10 April 2001 (aged 21)	(Football Association of Zambia) Green Buffaloes
4	DF	Esther Siamfuko	8 August 2004 (aged 17)	(Football Association of Zambia) Queens Academy
5	DF	Anita Mulenga	3 May 1995 (aged 27)	(Football Association of Zambia) Green Buffaloes
6	DF	Mary Wilombe	22 September 1997 (aged 24)	(Football Association of Zambia) Red Arrows
7	FW	Misozi Zulu	11 October 1994 (aged 27)	(Turkish Football Federation) Hakkarigücü
8	DF	Margaret Belemu	24 February 1997 (aged 25)	(Chinese Football Association) Shanghai Shengli
9	MF	Lubandji Ochumba	1 July 2002 (aged 20)	(Football Association of Zambia) Red Arrows
10	MF	Grace Chanda (captain)	11 June 1997 (aged 25)	(Kazakhstan Football Federation) BIIK Kazygurt
11	FW	Siomala Mapepa	4 June 2002 (aged 20)	(Football Association of Zambia) Lusaka Dynamos
12	MF	Evarine Katongo	29 December 2002 (aged 19)	(Football Association of Zambia) ZISD Queens
13	DF	Martha Tembo	8 March 1998 (aged 24)	(Football Association of Zambia) Green Buffaloes
14	MF	Ireen Lungu	6 October 1997 (aged 24)	(Football Association of Zambia) Green Buffaloes
15	DF	Agness Musase	11 July 1997 (aged 24)	(Football Association of Zambia) Green Buffaloes
16	GK	Hazel Nali	4 April 1998 (aged 24)	(Turkish Football Federation) Fatih Vatan
17	DF	Esther Banda	21 November 2004 (aged 17)	(Football Association of Zambia) Bauleni United Sports Academy
18	GK	Letisha Lungu	7 August 2004 (aged 17)	(Football Association of Zambia) ZESCO United
19	MF	Maweta Chilenga	3 August 2003 (aged 18)	(Football Association of Zambia) Bauleni United Sports Academy
20	FW	Noria Sosala	25 December 1988 (aged 33)	(Football Association of Zambia) Indeni Roses
21	FW	Avell Chitundu	30 July 1997 (aged 24)	(Football Association of Zambia) ZESCO United
22	FW	Natasha Nanyangwe	27 June 1999 (aged 23)	(Football Association of Zambia) Green Buffaloes

== Group C ==
=== Botswana ===
The squad was announced on 18 June 2022.

Head coach: Gaoletlhoo Nkutlwisang

No.	Pos.	Player	Date of birth (age)	Club
1	GK	Marilyin John	23 November 1996 (aged 25)	(Botswana Football Association) Botswana Defence Force
2	DF	Kesegofetse Mochawe	30 January 1995 (aged 27)	(Botswana Football Association) Double Action
3	DF	Nancy Baeletsi	21 March 1996 (aged 26)	(Botswana Football Association) Prisons
4	DF	Masego Montsho (captain)	15 June 1991 (aged 31)	(Botswana Football Association) Botswana Defence Force
5	DF	Theo George	30 January 2001 (aged 21)	(Botswana Football Association) Wonder Girls
6	MF	Golebaone Selebatso	22 March 1991 (aged 31)	(Botswana Football Association) Prisons
7	FW	Refilwe Tholakele	26 January 1996 (aged 26)	(Botswana Football Association) Township Rollers
8	DF	Lone Gaofetoge	16 July 2001 (aged 20)	(Botswana Football Association) Geronah
9	MF	Mokgabo Thanda	3 April 1993 (aged 29)	(Football Association of Zambia) Yasa
10	FW	Lesego Radiakanyo	27 June 1999 (aged 23)	(Botswana Football Association) Double Action
11	FW	Thuto Ramafifi	9 January 1992 (aged 30)	(United States Soccer Federation) Albany State Golden Rams
12	DF	Bonang Otlhagile	7 September 1986 (aged 35)	(Botswana Football Association) Double Action
13	MF	Keitumetse Dithebe	17 July 2002 (aged 19)	(Botswana Football Association) Mexican Girls
14	DF	Veronicah Mogotsi	21 August 1992 (aged 29)	(Botswana Football Association) Double Action
15	MF	Balotlhanyi Johannes	28 June 1994 (aged 28)	(Botswana Football Association) Double Action
16	GK	Sedilame Boseja	1 December 1997 (aged 24)	(South African Football Association) Mamelodi Sundowns
17	MF	Leano Busang	20 December 1999 (aged 22)	(Botswana Football Association) Prisons
18	FW	Nondi Mahlasela	25 December 1991 (aged 30)	(Botswana Football Association) Prisons
19	FW	Esalenna Galekhutle	23 January 2001 (aged 21)	(United States Soccer Federation) Tyler Apaches
20	FW	Gaonyadiwe Ontlametse	12 January 2000 (aged 22)	(Botswana Football Association) Double Action
21	MF	Annah Sechane	7 February 2001 (aged 21)	(Botswana Football Association) Township Rollers
22	DF	Goitsemang Tlamma	7 August 1998 (aged 23)	(Botswana Football Association) Botswana Defence Force
23	GK	Lesego Moeng	3 February 1998 (aged 24)	(Botswana Football Association) Botswana Defence Force
24	FW	Michelle Abueng	6 May 2001 (aged 21)	(Botswana Football Association) Botswana Defence Force
25	GK	Refiloe Tshambani	6 March 1994 (aged 28)	(Botswana Football Association) Prisons
26	DF	Laone Moloi	26 November 2000 (aged 21)	(Botswana Football Association) Double Action

=== Burundi ===
The squad was announced on 23 June 2022.

Head coach: Gustave Niyonkuru

No.	Pos.	Player	Date of birth (age)	Club
1	GK	Belinda Ndoreraho	5 August 1991 (aged 30)	(Football Federation of Burundi) La Colombe
2	DF	Charlotte Irankunda	2 April 2000 (aged 22)	(Football Federation of Burundi) Fofila PF
3	FW	Rukiya Bizimana	23 March 2006 (aged 16)	(Football Federation of Burundi) Etoile du Matin
4	FW	Bora Ineza	13 September 2005 (aged 16)	(Football Federation of Burundi) Fofila PF
5	FW	Gloris Gakiza	25 November 2007 (aged 14)	(Football Federation of Burundi) La Colombe
6	DF	Diane Irankunda	17 December 1997 (aged 24)	(Football Federation of Burundi) Fofila PF
7	FW	Aniella Uwimana	17 November 1999 (aged 22)	(Tanzania Football Federation) Yanga Princess
8	MF	Erica Kanyamuneza	11 August 2001 (aged 20)	(Football Federation of Burundi) PVP Buyenzi
9	FW	Sandrine Niyonkuru	1 January 2000 (aged 22)	(Tanzania Football Federation) Fountaingate Schools
10	FW	Falone Sumaili	16 June 2001 (aged 21)	(The Football Association) Huddersfield Town
11	MF	Asha Djafari (captain)	10 July 1998 (aged 23)	(Tanzania Football Federation) Simba Queens
12	DF	Angélique Keza	1 August 2004 (aged 17)	(Football Federation of Burundi) PVP Buyenzi
13	GK	Amissa Inarukundo	8 August 2005 (aged 16)	(Football Federation of Burundi) PVP Buyenzi
14	DF	Suzanne Zilfa	16 March 1998 (aged 24)	(Football Federation of Burundi) PVP Buyenzi
15	MF	Cheilla Ineza	7 July 2000 (aged 21)	(Swedish Football Association) Husqvarna FF
16	GK	Jeanine Irakoze	1 January 2000 (aged 22)	(Football Federation of Burundi) Fofila FF
17	DF	Nasra Nahimana	10 December 1999 (aged 22)	(Football Federation of Burundi) PVP Buyenzi
18	MF	Joëlle Bukuru	13 February 1999 (aged 23)	(Tanzania Football Federation) Simba Queens
19	DF	Rachelle Bukuru	1 January 1998 (aged 24)	(Tanzania Football Federation) The Tigers Queens
20	DF	Annociate Nshimirimana	2 October 2004 (aged 17)	(Football Federation of Burundi) PVP Buyenzi
21	DF	Djazila Uwineza	26 December 1996 (aged 25)	(Football Federation of Burundi) Fofila PF
22	DF	Saffira Guinand	12 September 2000 (aged 21)	(Swiss Football Association) FC Yverdon
23	GK	Ariella Umurerwa	27 February 2005 (aged 17)	(Football Federation of Burundi) La Colombe
24	MF	Peace Olga Niyomwungere	20 December 2005 (aged 16)	(Football Federation of Burundi) La Colombe
25	DF	Salha Nduwayo	12 December 1999 (aged 22)	(Swedish Football Association) Husqvarna FF
26	MF	Espérance Habonimana	12 April 2007 (aged 15)	(Football Federation of Burundi) Inyange Buja Queen

=== Nigeria ===
The squad was announced on 25 June 2022. Chidinma Okeke withdrew from the squad due to injury.

Head coach: (United States) Randy Waldrum

No.	Pos.	Player	Date of birth (age)	Club
1	GK	Tochukwu Oluehi	2 May 1987 (aged 35)	(Israel Football Association) Maccabi Kishronot Hadera
2	FW	Gift Monday	9 December 2001 (aged 20)	(Nigeria Football Federation) Bayelsa Queens
3	DF	Osinachi Ohale	21 December 1991 (aged 30)	(Royal Spanish Football Federation) Alavés
4	DF	Ashleigh Plumptre	8 May 1998 (aged 24)	(The Football Association) Leicester City
5	DF	Onome Ebi (captain)	8 May 1983 (aged 39)	(French Football Federation) Guingamp
6	FW	Uchenna Kanu	20 June 1997 (aged 25)	(Mexican Football Federation) Tigres UANL
7	MF	Toni Payne	22 April 1995 (aged 27)	(Royal Spanish Football Federation) Sevilla
8	FW	Asisat Oshoala	9 October 1994 (aged 27)	(Royal Spanish Football Federation) Barcelona
9	FW	Ifeoma Onumonu	25 February 1994 (aged 28)	(United States Soccer Federation) Gotham FC
10	MF	Rita Chikwelu	6 March 1988 (aged 34)	(Royal Spanish Football Federation) Madrid CFF
11	MF	Regina Otu	5 April 1992 (aged 30)	(Football Federation of Belarus) Minsk
12	DF	Glory Ogbonna	25 December 1998 (aged 23)	(Royal Spanish Football Federation) Santa Teresa
13	MF	Ngozi Okobi	14 December 1993 (aged 28)	(Swedish Football Association) Eskilstuna United
14	FW	Vivian Ikechukwu	10 July 1997 (aged 24)	(Lithuanian Football Federation) Gintra
15	MF	Rasheedat Ajibade	8 December 1999 (aged 22)	(Royal Spanish Football Federation) Atlético Madrid
16	GK	Chiamaka Nnadozie	8 December 2000 (aged 21)	(French Football Federation) Paris FC
17	FW	Francisca Ordega	19 October 1993 (aged 28)	(Russian Football Union) CSKA Moscow
18	MF	Halimatu Ayinde	16 May 1995 (aged 27)	(Swedish Football Association) Eskistuna United
19	DF	Akudo Esther Ogbonna	9 April 2000 (aged 22)	(Nigeria Football Federation) Edo Queens
20	DF	Michelle Alozie	28 April 1997 (aged 25)	(United States Soccer Federation) Houston Dash
21	GK	Yewande Balogun	28 September 1989 (aged 32)	(United States Soccer Federation) Coppermine United
22	MF	Peace Efih	5 August 2000 (age 26)	(Israel Football Association) Kiryat Gat
23	MF	Christy Ucheibe	25 December 2000 (aged 21)	(Portuguese Football Federation) Benfica
24	FW	Chinonyerem Macleans	1 October 1999 (aged 22)	(Polish Football Association) Górnik Łęczna
26	DF	Nicole Payne	18 January 2001 (aged 21)	(United States Soccer Federation) West Virginia Mountaineers

=== South Africa ===
A preliminary squad was announced on 1 June 2022. The squad was announced on 20 June 2022. Kebotseng Moletsane, Tiisetso Makhubela, and Thubelihle Shamase were on standby, but included in the final squad.

Head coach: Desiree Ellis

No.	Pos.	Player	Date of birth (age)	Club
1	GK	Kaylin Swart	30 September 1994 (aged 27)	(South African Football Association) JVW
2	DF	Lebogang Ramalepe	3 December 1991 (aged 30)	(Football Federation of Belarus) Dinamo Minsk
3	DF	Bongeka Gamede	22 May 1999 (aged 23)	(South African Football Association) UWC
4	DF	Noko Matlou	30 September 1985 (aged 36)	(Royal Spanish Football Federation) Eibar
5	DF	Janine van Wyk (captain)	17 April 1987 (aged 35)	(South African Football Association) JVW
6	MF	Thalea Smidt	27 December 1997 (aged 24)	(South African Football Association) Mamelodi Sundowns
7	DF	Karabo Dhlamini	18 September 2001 (aged 20)	(South African Football Association) Mamelodi Sundowns
8	FW	Hildah Magaia	16 December 1994 (aged 27)	(Korea Football Association) Sejong Sportstoto
9	FW	Noxolo Cesane	11 October 2000 (aged 21)	(South African Football Association) UWC
10	MF	Linda Motlhalo	1 July 1998 (aged 24)	(Swedish Football Association) Djurgården
11	FW	Thembi Kgatlana	2 May 1996 (aged 26)	(Royal Spanish Football Federation) Atlético Madrid
12	FW	Jermaine Seoposenwe	12 October 1993 (aged 28)	(Portuguese Football Federation) Braga
13	DF	Bambanani Mbane	12 March 1990 (aged 32)	(South African Football Association) Mamelodi Sundowns
14	MF	Nomvula Kgoale	20 November 1995 (aged 26)	(South African Football Association) TUT
15	MF	Refiloe Jane	4 August 1992 (aged 29)	(Italian Football Federation) Milan
16	GK	Andile Dlamini	2 September 1992 (aged 29)	(South African Football Association) Mamelodi Sundowns
17	FW	Melinda Kgadiete	21 July 1992 (aged 29)	(South African Football Association) Mamelodi Sundowns
18	MF	Sibulele Holweni	28 April 2001 (aged 21)	(South African Football Association) Sophakama/HPC
19	MF	Kholosa Biyana	6 September 1994 (aged 27)	(Royal Spanish Football Federation) Sporting Gijón
20	MF	Robyn Moodaly	16 June 1994 (aged 28)	(South African Football Association) JVW
21	GK	Regirl Ngobeni	29 February 1996 (aged 26)	(South African Football Association) UWC
22	MF	Amogelang Motau	27 February 1997 (aged 25)	(South African Football Association) UWC
23	FW	Nthabiseng Majiya	10 June 2004 (aged 18)	(South African Football Association) Richmond
24	GK	Kebotseng Moletsane	3 March 1995 (aged 27)	(South African Football Association) Bloemfontein Celtic
25	DF	Tiisetso Makhubela	24 April 1997 (aged 25)	(South African Football Association) Mamelodi Sundowns
26	MF	Thubelihle Shamase	16 January 2002 (aged 20)	(South African Football Association) University of Johannesburg

== Player representation ==
=== By club ===
Clubs with 6 or more players represented are listed.

Players	Club
14	(Morocco) AS FAR
8	(Senegal) US Parcelles Assainie
7	(Botswana) Double Action, (Burkina Faso) USFA, (South Africa) Mamelodi Sundowns, (Zambia) Green Buffaloes
6	(Burkina Faso) ASO, (Burundi) PVP Buyenzi, (Togo) Amis du Monde, (Togo) Athlèta

=== By club nationality ===
Players	Clubs
24	Burkina Faso
23	France
22	Botswana
20	Morocco, Senegal
19	South Africa, Zambia
18	Togo
17	Burundi
16	Uganda
11	Spain
10	United States
8	Turkey
7	Tunisia
6	Cameroon, Sweden
5	Belarus, Italy, Tanzania
4	Kazakhstan, Nigeria
3	England, Israel, Russia, Switzerland
2	Germany, Jordan, Portugal, United Arab Emirates
1	Austria, Belgium, China, Czech Republic, (Democratic Republic of the Congo) DR Congo, Denmark, Finland, Ghana, Iceland, Kenya, Lithuania, Mexico, Netherlands, Poland, South Korea

=== By club federation ===
Players	Federation
200	CAF
87	UEFA
11	CONCACAF
6	AFC

=== By representatives of domestic league ===
National squad	Players
Burkina Faso	24
Botswana	22
Senegal	20
South Africa	18
Togo	18
Zambia	18
Burundi	17
Morocco	17
Uganda	16
Tunisia	7
Cameroon	6
Nigeria	2
