= Botswana women's national football team results =

This article lists the results and fixtures for the Botswana women's national football team.

The Botswana women's national football team, known by its official nickname, The Mares, represents Botswana in women's football. Governed by the Botswana Football Association (BFA), the team competes as a member of the Confederation of African Football (CAF).

The team made its international debut in 2002, participating in the inaugural 2002 COSAFA Women's Championship in Zimbabwe. In their first-ever match, they suffered a 14–0 defeat to South Africa on 19 April 2002, which remains their biggest loss to date. They recorded their largest victory on two occasions: the first time on 5 March 2016, at home against Mauritius with a 7–0 win in the first leg of the 2016 Africa Cup of Nations qualifiers (11–0 on aggregate over the two matches), and then a second time on 29 September 2021, when they defeated South Sudan 7–0 at the 2021 2021 COSAFA Women's Championship.

Until 2024, the team only competed against African opponents. Their first match against a non-African team was on 27 February 2024, facing Russia in their first game outside Africa, which ended in a 4–0 loss.

== Results ==
=== 2002 ===
19 April 2002 COSAFA Championship	South Africa	14–0	Botswana	Harare, Zimbabwe

21 April 2002 COSAFA Championship	Botswana	0–3	Lesotho	Harare, Zimbabwe

24 April 2002 COSAFA Championship	Mozambique	7–1	Botswana	Harare, Zimbabwe

=== 2007 ===
30 November 2008 African Championship qualifiying	Botswana	0–3	Namibia
		Report

16 December 2008 African Championship qualifiying	Namibia	6–1 (9–1 agg.)	Botswana
		Report

=== 2008 ===
4 May Friendly	Botswana	2–4	Zambia

=== 2010 ===
7 March 2010 African Championship qualifying	Botswana	0–2	DR Congo	Gaborone
			Malembo 11'; Dianteso 17'	Stadium: University of Botswana Stadium; Referee: Gladys Lengwe (Zambia)

19 March 2010 African Championship qualifying	DR Congo	5–2 (7–2 agg.)	Botswana	Kinshasa, Congo DR
15:30 UTC+2	Malembo 20', 27'; Nzuzi 24', 28'; Mafutu 88'		Ramasi 21', 55'	Stadium: Stade des Martyrs; Referee: Thérèse Sylvie Abou'ou (Cameroon)

2 October 2012 CAF Olympic qualifying tournament	Botswana	1–4	Zambia	Lobatse

23 October 2012 CAF Olympic qualifying tournament	Zambia	2–1 (6–2 agg.)	Botswana	Lusaka, Zambia

25 October Friendly	Botswana	2–3	Tanzania	Gaborone

26 October Friendly	Botswana	1–1	Tanzania	Gaborone

=== 2011 ===
26 March Friendly	Namibia	1–0	Botswana	Windhoek, Namibia

30 April 2011 All-Africa Games qualifying	South Africa	0–1	Botswana	Polokwane, South Africa

15 May 2011 All-Africa Games qualifying	Botswana	0–4 (1–4 agg.)	South Africa	Gaborone

2 July 2011 COSAFA Championship	Botswana	1–3	Tanzania	Harare, Zimbabwe

3 July 2011 COSAFA Championship	Botswana	0–4	South Africa	Harare, Zimbabwe

5 July 2011 COSAFA Championship	Zambia	4–1	Botswana	Harare, Zimbabwe

=== 2012 ===
14 January 2012 African Championship qualifiying	Botswana	0–1	Zimbabwe	Gaborone

29 January 2012 African Championship qualifiying	Zimbabwe	2–1 (3–1 agg.)	Botswana	Harare, Zimbabwe

10 December Friendly	South Africa	3–0	Botswana	Moruleng, South Africa

22 December Friendly	Zimbabwe	5–0	Botswana	Harare, Zimbabwe

=== 2014 ===
7 February Friendly	Eswatini	0–3	Botswana	Manzini, Swaziland

8 February Friendly	Eswatini	1–3	Botswana	Manzini, Swaziland

14 February 2014 African Championship qualifiying	Botswana	0–1	Zimbabwe	Gaborone

2 March 2014 African Championship qualifiying	Zimbabwe	2–1 (3–1 agg.)	Botswana	Harare, Zimbabwe

7 June Friendly	South Africa	4–0	Botswana	Vanderbijlpark, South Africa

20 August Friendly	Namibia	5–2	Botswana	Windhoek, Namibia

13 September Friendly	South Africa	10–0	Botswana	Phokeng, South Africa

=== 2015 ===
22 February 2015 African Games qualifying	Madagascar	1–3	Botswana	Antananarivo, Madagascar

6 March 2015 African Games qualifying	Botswana	0–1 (3–2 agg.)	Madagascar	Gaborone

21 March 2015 African Games qualifying	Botswana	0–1	South Africa	Gaborone

11 April 2015 African Games qualifying	South Africa	5–0 (6–0 agg.)	Botswana	Soweto, South Africa

22 May 2015 CAF Olympic qualifying tournament	Botswana	2–1	Kenya	Lobatse

31 May 2015 CAF Olympic qualifying tournament	Kenya	1–0 (2–2 agg.)	Botswana	Machakos, Kenya

=== 2016 ===
5 March 2016 Africa Cup of Nations qualifying	Botswana	7–0	Mauritius	Lobatse
16:00 UTC+2	Mahlasela 19', 52'; Otlhagile 45'; Motlhale 62'; Ngenda 71'; Selebatso 87'; Mathlo 90'	Report		Stadium: Lobatse Stadium; Referee: Mercy Mziya (Malawi)

31 May 2016 Africa Cup of Nations qualifying	Mauritius	0–4 (0–11 agg.)	Botswana	Curepipe, Mauritius
16:30 UTC+4		Report	Lesaane 27'; Tholakele 28', 74'; Ramafifi 68'	Stadium: Stade George V Referee: Nirinjanahary Raharijaona (Madagascar)

9 April 2016 Africa Cup of Nations qualifying	Botswana	0–2	South Africa	Lobatse
16:00 UTC+2		Report	Mollo 69', 73'	Stadium: Lobatse Stadium; Referee: Rusina Kuda Majo (Zimbabwe)

12 April 2016 Africa Cup of Nations qualifying	South Africa	3–0 (5–0 agg.)	Botswana	Tembisa, South Africa
19:00 UTC+2	Makhabane 19' (pen.); Mollo 27'; Nyandeni 36'	Report		Stadium: Makhulong Stadium; Referee: Mathabo Maria Kolokotoane (Lesotho)

13 August Friendly	Botswana	2–3	Lesotho	Gaborone

14 August Friendly	Botswana	0–3	Lesotho	Gaborone

=== 2017 ===
13 September 2017 COSAFA Championship GS	Namibia	4–0	Botswana	Bulawayo, Zimbabwe
10:30 UTC+2	Shangula 16', 43'; Coleman 41' (pen.); Shikusho 87'	Report		Stadium: Barbourfields Stadium

16 September 2017 COSAFA Championship GS	Lesotho	0–3	Botswana	Bulawayo, Zimbabwe
14:00 UTC+2		Report	Gammu 3'; Otlhagile 22', 26'	Stadium: Luveve Stadium

17 September 2017 COSAFA Championship GS	South Africa	1–1	Botswana	Bulawayo, Zimbabwe
16:30 UTC+2	Esau 87'	Report	Tholakele 84'	Stadium: Luveve Stadium

=== 2018 ===
25 August Friendly	Botswana	5–0	Lesotho	Gaborone
	Johannes; Thanda; Radiakanyo; Own Goal	Report

26 August Friendly	Botswana	2–0	Lesotho	Gaborone
	Selebatso; Johannes	Report

12 September 2018 COSAFA Championship GS	Botswana	2–0	Malawi	iBhayi, South Africa
10:00 UTC+2	Keleboge 6'; Radiakanyo 78'	Report		Stadium: Wolfson Stadium

14 September 2018 COSAFA Championship GS	Botswana	0–1	South Africa	iBhayi, South Africa
15:30 UTC+2		Report	Seoposenwe 90+5'	Stadium: Wolfson Stadium

17 September 2018 COSAFA Championship GS	Botswana	0–0	Madagascar	Port Elizabeth, South Africa
15:30 UTC+2		Report		Stadium: Gelvandale Stadium

=== 2019 ===
5 April 2020 CAF Olympic qualifying tournament	Botswana	1–0	Namibia	Gaborone
18:00 UTC+2	Tholakele 81'	Report		Stadium: Botswana National Stadium

9 April 2020 CAF Olympic qualifying tournament	Namibia	2–2 (2–3 agg.)	Botswana	Windhoek, Namibia
18:30 UTC+2	Mulunga 3'; Coleman 41'	Report	Mahlasela 10', 52'	Stadium: Sam Nujoma Stadium

20 July Practice Match	Eswatini	4–3	Botswana	Nhlangano, Eswatini
				Stadium: King Sobhuza Stadium

21 July Practice Match	Eswatini	0–0	Botswana	Nhlangano, Eswatini
				Stadium: King Sobhuza Stadium

1 August 2019 COSAFA Championship GS	Namibia	0–1	Botswana	iBhayi, South Africa
15:30 UTC+2		Report	Abueng 44'	Stadium: Wolfson Stadium

3 August 2019 COSAFA Championship GS	Mauritius	0–3	Botswana	iBhayi, South Africa
12:45 UTC+2		Report	Galekhutle 21'; Mosotho 37'; Dithebe 77'	Stadium: Wolfson Stadium

6 August 2019 COSAFA Championship GS	Botswana	0–0	Zambia	iBhayi, South Africa
15:30 UTC+2		Report		Stadium: Wolfson Stadium

8 August 2019 COSAFA Championship SF	Zambia	4–0	Botswana	iBhayi, South Africa
12:30 UTC+2	Nachula 12', 78'; Mubanga 26'; Mwakapila 33'	Report		Stadium: Wolfson Stadium

11 August 2019 COSAFA Championship 3rd Place	Botswana	0–3	Zimbabwe	iBhayi, South Africa
15:00 UTC+2		Report	Muzongondi 48', 90'; Chirandu 52'	Stadium: Wolfson Stadium

30 August 2020 CAF Olympic qualifying tournament	Botswana	0–0	South Africa	Gaborone
19:00 UTC+2		Report		Stadium: National Stadium

3 September 2020 CAF Olympic qualifying tournament	South Africa	0–0 (a.e.t.) (0–0 agg.) (2–3 p)	Botswana	Soweto, South Africa
19:00 UTC+2		Report		Stadium: Orlando Stadium
	Penalties
	Smeda (penalty scored); Ramalepe (penalty missed); Makhabane (penalty missed); Mbane (penalty scored); Jane (penalty missed)		(penalty scored) Radiakanyo; (penalty scored) Gaofetoge; (penalty missed) Tholakele; (penalty missed) Thanda; (penalty scored) Boseja

2 October 2020 CAF Olympic qualifying tournament	Zambia	1–0	Botswana	Lusaka, Zambia
15:00 UTC+2	Mwakapila 21'	Report		Stadium: Nkoloma Stadium

8 October 2020 CAF Olympic qualifying tournament	Botswana	0–2 (0–3 agg.)	Zambia	Francistown
19:00 UTC+2		Report	Chanda 18', 53'	Stadium: Francistown Stadium

=== 2020 ===
7 November 2020 COSAFA Championship GS	Botswana	1–0	Tanzania	iBhayi, South Africa
12:30 UTC+2	Thanda 48'	Report		Stadium: Wolfson Stadium

9 November 2020 COSAFA Championship GS	Zimbabwe	0–1	Botswana	Port Elizabeth, South Africa
12:30 UTC+2		Report	Tholekele 73'	Stadium: Gelvandale Stadium

12 November 2020 COSAFA Championship SF	Botswana	2–1	Zambia	iBhayi, South Africa
12:00 UTC+2	Gaofetoge 8'; Tholekele 39' (pen.)	Report	Lungu 45+5'	Stadium: Wolfson Stadium

14 November 2020 COSAFA Championship F	Botswana	1–2	South Africa	iBhayi, South Africa
15:00 UTC+2	Thanda 85'	Report	Holweni 2'; Salgado 66'	Stadium: Wolfson Stadium

=== 2021 ===
13 April Friendly	South Africa	2–0	Botswana	Johannesburg, South Africa
15:00 UTC+2	Kgatlana 51'; Salgado 56'	Report		Stadium: Wits Soccer Stadium

29 September 2021 COSAFA Championship GS	Botswana	7–0	South Sudan	iBhayi, South Africa
12:00 UTC+2	Tholakele 9', 30', 40'; Radiakanyo 15'; Thanda 24'; Johannes 39'; Montsho 87'	Report		Stadium: Wolfson Stadium

2 October 2021 COSAFA Championship GS	Botswana	0–2	Tanzania	Port Elizabeth, South Africa
12:00 UTC+2		Report	Minja 5'; Shurua 79'	Stadium: Gelvandale Stadium; Referee: Mercy Kayria (Malawi)

4 October 2021 COSAFA Championship GS	Botswana	0–3	Zimbabwe	iBhayi, South Africa
12:00 UTC+2		Report	Mupeti 42'; Msipa 65'; Neshamba 83'	Stadium: Wolfson Stadium

20 October 2022 Africa Cup of Nations qualifying	Angola	1–5	Botswana	Luanda, Angola
17:00 UTC+1	Ngonguita 8'	Report	Tholakele 5', 49'; Thanda 42'; Radiakanyo 48', 74'	Stadium: Estádio dos Coqueiros

26 October 2022 Africa Cup of Nations qualifying	Botswana	2–0 (7–1 agg.)	Angola	Francistown
16:00 UTC+2	Thanda 14'; Ramafifi 16'	Report		Stadium: Francistown Stadium

=== 2022 ===
18 February 2022 Africa Cup of Nations qualifying	Zimbabwe	1–3	Botswana	Harare, Zimbabwe
15:00 UTC+2	Mupeti 86'	Report	Tholakele 47'; Radiakanyo 77', 90+5'	Stadium: National Sports Stadium; Referee: Vistoria Shangula (Namibia)

23 February 2022 Africa Cup of Nations qualifying	Botswana	0–2 (3–3 agg.)	Zimbabwe	Francistown
18:00 UTC+2		Report	Msipa 66'; Mupeti 70'	Stadium: Francistown Stadium; Referee: Gloria Sambumba (Zambia)

29 April Friendly	Zambia	1–0	Botswana	Lusaka, Zambia
15:00 UTC+2	Lubandji 84'	Report		Stadium: Woodlands Stadium

2 May Friendly	Zambia	1–1	Botswana	Lusaka, Zambia
15:00 UTC+2	Mweemba 58'	Report	Radiakanyo 27'	Stadium: Nkoloma Stadium

29 June Friendly	Botswana	1–1	Togo	Marrakesh, Morocco
19:00 UTC+1	Mahlasela 70'	Report	Woedikou 52'	Stadium: Marrakesh Stadium

4 July 2022 Africa Cup of Nations GS	Burundi	2–4	Botswana	Rabat, Morocco
21:00 UTC+1	Niyonkuru 52', 81'	Report	Dithebe 43'; Radiakanyo 47'; Tholakele 55', 60'	Stadium: Stade Moulay Hassan; Referee: Mame Faye (Senegal)

7 July 2022 Africa Cup of Nations GS	Botswana	0–2	Nigeria	Rabat, Morocco
21:00 UTC+1		Report	Onumonu 21'; Ucheibe 48'	Stadium: Stade Moulay Hassan; Referee: Letticia Viana (Eswatini)

10 July 2022 Africa Cup of Nations GS	South Africa	1–0	Botswana	Rabat, Morocco
21:00 UTC+1	Majiya 80'	Report		Stadium: Prince Moulay Abdellah Stadium; Referee: Dorsaf Ganouati (Tunisia)

13 July 2022 Africa Cup of Nations QF	Morocco	2–1	Botswana	Rabat, Morocco
21:00 UTC+1	Mssoudy 3'; Mrabet 59'	Report	Dithebe 7'	Stadium: Prince Moulay Abdellah Stadium; Referee: Vincentia Amedome (Togo)

17 July 2022 Africa Cup of Nations Repechage	Botswana	0–1	Cameroon	Rabat, Morocco
21:00 UTC+1		Report	Nchout 45+1'	Stadium: Stade Moulay Hassan; Referee: Suavis Iratunga (Burundi)

2 September 2022 COSAFA Championship GS	Botswana	1–1	Malawi	Gqeberha, South Africa
15:30 UTC+2	Gaonyadiwe 14'	Report	Mvula 7'	Stadium: Madibaz Stadium

5 September 2022 COSAFA Championship GS	Botswana	0–0	Tanzania	Gqeberha, South Africa
15:30 UTC+2		Report		Stadium: Madibaz Stadium

7 September 2022 COSAFA Championship GS	Comoros	0–6	Botswana	Gqeberha, South Africa
15:30 UTC+2		Report	Gaonyadiwe 51', 53', 90'; Radiakanyo 43'; Mosotho 68'	Stadium: Madibaz Stadium

30 September Friendly	Botswana	2–1	Namibia	Gaborone
14:45 UTC+2	Gaonyadiwe 18'; Mahlasela 38'	Report	Kopper 48'	Stadium: Botswana National Stadium

=== 2023 ===
2 July Friendly	South Africa	0–5	Botswana	Tsakane, South Africa
15:00 UTC+2		Report	Gaonyadiwe 5', 13'; Dithebe 24'; Tholakele 27', 79'	Stadium: Tsakani Stadium; Referee: Vistoria Shangula (Namibia)

12 August Friendly	Botswana	1–1	Lesotho	Gaborone
15:00 UTC+2	Dithebe	Report		Stadium: Lekidi Football Centre East Ground

12 August Friendly	Botswana	4–1	Lesotho	Gaborone
	Gaofetoge; Moloi; Dithebe	Report		Stadium: Lekidi Football Centre East Ground

22 September 2024 Africa Cup of Nations qualifying	Gabon	1–4	Botswana	Franceville, Gabon
16:30 UTC+2	Assengone 90+3' (pen.)	Report	Radiakanyo 56'; Ontlametse 76', 89'; Tholakele 90'	Stadium: Stade de Franceville; Referee: Greta Musimu (DR Congo)

26 September 2024 Africa Cup of Nations qualifying	Botswana	6–0 (10–1 agg.)	Gabon	Lobatse
15:00 UTC+2	Radiakanyo 8'; Ontlametse 10', 30'; Baeletsi 40'; Dithebe 45+4'; Gaofetoge 57'	Report		Stadium: Lobatse Stadium

6 October 2023 COSAFA Championship GS	Namibia	1–1	Botswana	Atteridgeville, South Africa
15:30 UTC+2	Hikuam 6'	Report	Mochawe 79'	Stadium: Lucas Moripe Stadium; Referee: Gloria Sambumba (Zambia)

9 October 2023 COSAFA Championship GS	Botswana	3–0	Lesotho	Soweto, South Africa
12:00 UTC+2	Gaofetoge 6'; Johannes 35'; Mochawe 73'	Report		Stadium: Dobsonville Stadium; Referee: Akhona Makalima (South Africa)

11 October 2023 COSAFA Championship GS	Zimbabwe	1–1	Botswana	Soweto, South Africa
15:30 UTC+2	Chemhere 4'	Report	Johannes 86'	Stadium: Dobsonville Stadium; Referee: Salima Mukansanga (Rwanda)

26 October 2024 CAF Olympic qualifying tournament	Tanzania	2–0	Botswana	Chamazi, Tanzania
16:00 UTC+3	Clement 2' (pen.); Masaka 89'	Report		Stadium: Azam Complex Stadium

31 October 2024 CAF Olympic qualifying tournament	Botswana	0–1 (0–3 agg.)	Tanzania	Gaborone
18:00 UTC+2		Report	Masaka 26'	Stadium: Botswana National Stadium

29 November 2024 Africa Cup of Nations qualifying	Kenya	1–1	Botswana	Nairobi, Kenya
15:00 UTC+3	Nekesa 45+4' (pen.)	Report	Dithebe 37'	Stadium: Nyayo National Stadium

5 December 2024 Africa Cup of Nations qualifying	Botswana	1–0 (2–1 agg.)	Kenya	Gaborone
15:00 UTC+2	Dithebe 62'	Report		Stadium: Botswana National Stadium

=== 2024 ===
27 February Friendly	Russia	4–0	Botswana	Kadriye, Turkey
17:00 UTC+3	Belomyttseva 3', 86' (pen.); Fedorova 9'; Smirnova 42'	Report		Stadium: RIU Kaya Hotel Sports Center

6 April Friendly	Botswana	2–1	Lesotho	Tlokweng
16:00 UTC+2	Moloi 32'; Dithebe 48'	Report	Ts'oaeli 73'	Stadium: Royal Aria Stadium

9 April Friendly	Botswana	1–1	Namibia	Tlokweng
16:00 UTC+2	Senwelo 36'	Report	Coleman 38'	Stadium: Royal Aria Stadium

13 July 2024 Tunis Cup	Botswana	0–0	Tanzania	Ariana, Tunisia
17:00 UTC+1		Report		Stadium: Stade Municipal d'Ariana

15 July 2024 Tunis Cup	Tunisia	1–0	Botswana	Ariana, Tunisia
17:00 UTC+1	Shaiek 75'	Report		Stadium: Stade Municipal d'Ariana

23 October 2024 COSAFA Championship GS	Malawi	1–1	Botswana	Ibhayi, South Africa
15:00 UTC+2	Chizimu 28'	Report	Moloi 40'	Stadium: Isaac Wolfson Stadium; Referee: Nteboheleng Setoko (Lesotho)

26 October 2024 COSAFA Championship GS	Botswana	5–0	Mauritius	Gqeberha, South Africa
12:00 UTC+2	Dithebe 5'; Ontlametse 45+4'; Modise 58', 60', 69' (pen.)	Report		Stadium: Madibaz Stadium; Referee: Tania Marisa Duarte (Angola)

28 October 2024 COSAFA Championship GS	Botswana	0–0	Madagascar	Ibhayi, South Africa
12:00 UTC+2		Report		Stadium: Isaac Wolfson Stadium; Referee: Mercy Chipo Mayimbo (Zimbabwe)

28 November Friendly	Morocco	3–1	Botswana	Tétouan, Morocco
18:00 UTC+1	Jraïdi 6', 45'; Kassi 40'	Report	Moloi 71'	Stadium: Saniat Rmel Stadium; Referee: Aida Sy (Senegal)

30 November Friendly	Mali	0–1	Botswana	Tanger, Morocco
16:00 UTC+1		Report	Moloi 61'	Stadium: Tanger Stadium

=== 2025 ===
20 February 2025 2026 WAFCON qualifying	Botswana	0–2	DR Congo	Francistown, Botswana
15:00 UTC+2		Report	Gaofetoge 1' (o.g.); Mabomba 90+8'	Stadium: Francistown Stadium

26 February 2025 2026 WAFCON qualifying	DR Congo	0–0 (2–0 agg.)	Botswana	Kinshasa, Congo DR
17:00 UTC+1		Report		Stadium: Stade des Martyrs; Referee: Shamirah Nabadda (Uganda)
Note: DR Congo won 2–0 on aggregate.

28 May 2025 Nations Challenge	South Africa	3–2	Botswana	Pretoria, South Africa
15:00 UTC+2	Mibe 13'; Seoposenwe 16', 36'	Report	Radiakanyo 41'; Moloi 63'	Stadium: Lucas Moripe Stadium

31 May 2025 Nations Challenge	Botswana	1–1	Zambia	Pretoria, South Africa
15:00 UTC+2	Ontlametse 80'	Report	B. Banda 63'	Stadium: Lucas Moripe Stadium

6 July 2025 2024 WAFCON GS	Algeria	1–0	Botswana	Casablanca, Morocco
20:00 UTC+1	Karchouni 11'			Stadium: Père Jégo Stadium; Referee: Yacine Samassa (Mauritania)

10 July CAF WAFCON 2024 GS	Botswana	0–1	Nigeria	Casablanca, Morocco
20:00 UTC+1		Report	Ihezuo 89'	Stadium: Larbi Zaouli Stadium; Referee: Aline Umutoni (Rwanda)

13 July 2024 WAFCON GS	Tunisia	1–2	Botswana	Casablanca, Morocco
20:00 UTC+0	Khanchouch 12'	Report	Radiakanyo 66'; Ontlametse 90+5'	Stadium: Père Jégo Stadium; Referee: Aline Guimbang Etong (Cameroon)

=== 2026 ===
19 February 2025 COSAFA Championship	Zambia	3–0	Botswana	Polokwane, South Africa
15:00 UTC+2	Chanda 16'; Banda 45+1'; Mupopo 72'	Report		Stadium: Old Peter Mokaba Stadium; Referee: Nonjabulo Ndlela (South Africa)

22 February 2025 COSAFA Championship	Botswana	1–1	Eswatini	Seshego, South Africa
12:00 UTC+2	Mamela 23'	Report	Mokgale 38'	Stadium: Seshego Stadium; Referee: Mathapelo Morake (Lesotho)

24 February 2025 COSAFA Championship	Zimbabwe	1–0	Botswana	Seshego, South Africa
12:00 UTC+2	Makore 70'	Report		Stadium: Seshego Stadium; Referee: Nonjabulo Ndlela (South Africa)

10 April Friendly	Saudi Arabia	1–1	Botswana	Abha, Saudi Arabia
19:00 UTC+3	Tawfiq 90+5'	Report	Moloi 28'	Stadium: Prince Sultan bin Abdulaziz Sports City Stadium; Referee: Husain Al-Showaikh (Bahrain)

12 April Friendly	Saudi Arabia U20	0–3	Botswana	Taif, Saudi Arabia
18:00 UTC+3		Report	Moloi 55', 86', 89'	Stadium: Reserve Stadium (1) at King Fahd Sports City

26 September Friendly	Botswana	1–1	Namibia
15:00		Report

29 September Friendly	Botswana	4–1	Namibia
11:30		Report

9 October 2026 2028 Olympic Qualification 2nd round	Botswana	0–1	Tanzania	Gaborone, Botswana
19:00 UTC+2		Report	Clement 64'	Stadium: National Stadium; Referee: Yemisi Akintoye (Nigeria)

13 October 2026 2028 Olympic Qualification 2nd round	Tanzania	6–0 (7–0 agg.)	Botswana	Chamazi, Tanzania
16:00 UTC+3	Mnunka 39'; Ubamba 44'; Maseke 60'; Clement 69'; Siyame 74'; Lunyamila 90'	Report		Stadium: Azam Complex Stadium; Referee: Rachel Zihindula (DR Congo)

== See also ==
- Botswana women's national football team
- Botswana national football team results (2020 to present)
