= 2022 Women's Africa Cup of Nations Group C =

Football tournament group stage

Group C of 2022 Women's Africa Cup of Nations will be played from 4 to 10 July 2022. The group was made up of Nigeria, South Africa, debutants Burundi and Botswana.

== Teams ==
Draw position	Team	Pot	Federation	Method of qualification	Date of qualification	Finals appearance	Last appearance	Previous best performance	FIFA Rankings										
Draw position	Team	Pot	Federation	Method of qualification	Date of qualification	Finals appearance	Last appearance	Previous best performance	FIFA Rankings	C1	Nigeria	Seed	WAFU	2022 Africa Women Cup of Nations qualification winner	23 February 2022	14th	2018	Champions (1991, 1995, 1998, 2000, 2002, 2004, 2006, 2010, 2014, 2016, 2018)	39
C2	South Africa	1	COSAFA	2022 Africa Women Cup of Nations qualification winner	23 February 2022	13th	2018	Runners-up (1995, 2000, 2008, 2012, 2018)	58										
C3	Burundi	1	CECAFA	2022 Africa Women Cup of Nations qualification winner	21 February 2022	1st	—	Debut	169										
C4	Botswana	1	COSAFA	2022 Africa Women Cup of Nations qualification winner	23 February 2022	1st	—	Debut	152										

== Standings ==
Pos	Team	Pld	W	D	L	GF	GA	GD	Pts	Qualification
1	South Africa	3	3	0	0	6	2	+4	9	Knockout stage
2	Nigeria	3	2	0	1	7	2	+5	6	Knockout stage
3	Botswana	3	1	0	2	4	5	−1	3	Knockout stage
4	Burundi	3	0	0	3	3	11	−8	0	

Source: CAF (archived)
Rules for classification: Group stage tiebreakers

== Matches ==
=== Nigeria vs South Africa ===
4 July 2022
18:00

Nigeria	1–2	South Africa
Ajibade 90+2'	Report (FIFA); Report (CAF)	Seoposenwe 61'; Magaia 63'

Stade Moulay Hassan, Rabat
Referee: Bouchra Karboubi (Morocco)

Nigeria

Team stats
Nigeria	Statistic	South Africa
13	Shots	9
4	Shots on target	2
43%	Possession	57%
271	Passes	350
68%	Pass accuracy	73%
13	Fouls	7
1	Yellow cards	0
0	Red cards	0
1	Offsides	1
5	Corners	7

South Africa

Formation: 4–3–3
GK	1	Tochukwu Oluehi
RB	20	Michelle Alozie	(yellow card) 44'
CB	5	Onome Ebi
CB	3	Osinachi Ohale
LB	4	Ashleigh Plumptre
DM	18	Halimatu Ayinde
CM	10	Rita Chikwelu	(substituted off) 70'
CM	15	Rasheedat Ajibade
RF	7	Toni Payne
CF	8	Asisat Oshoala	(substituted off) 82'
LF	9	Ifeoma Onumonu	(substituted off) 82'
Substitutions:
FW	17	Francisca Ordega	(substituted on) 82'
FW	14	Vivian Ikechukwu	(substituted on) 70'
FW	6	Uchenna Kanu	(substituted on) 82'
Manager:
(United States) Randy Waldrum

Formation: 4–4–2
GK	16	Andile Dlamini
RB	2	Lebogang Ramalepe
CB	13	Bambanani Mbane
CB	4	Noko Matlou
LB	18	Sibulele Holweni	(substituted off) 79'
RM	9	Noxolo Cesane
CM	15	Refiloe Jane
CM	10	Linda Motlhalo
LM	8	Hildah Magaia	(substituted off) 69'
CF	11	Thembi Kgatlana	(substituted off) 90'
CF	12	Jermaine Seoposenwe
Substitutions:
MF	20	Robyn Moodaly	(substituted on) 90'
DF	3	Bongeka Gamede	(substituted on) 79'
MF	22	Amogelang Motau	(substituted on) 69'
Manager:
Desiree Ellis

=== Burundi vs Botswana ===
4 July 2022
21:00

Burundi	2–4	Botswana
Niyonkuru 52', 81'	Report (FIFA); Report (CAF)	Dithebe 43'; Radiakanyo 47'; Tholakele 55', 60'

Stade Moulay Hassan, Rabat
Referee: Mame Faye (Senegal)

Burundi

Team stats
Burundi	Statistic	Botswana
14	Shots	14
7	Shots on target	5
49%	Possession	51%
300	Passes	327
61%	Pass accuracy	60%
12	Fouls	24
2	Yellow cards	3
0	Red cards	0
0	Offsides	0
5	Corners	3

Botswana

Formation: 4–2–3–1
GK	16	Jeanine Irakoze
RB	17	Nasra Nahimana
CB	6	Diane Irankunda
CB	25	Salha Nduwayo	(yellow card) 11'
LB	20	Annociate Nshimirimana	(yellow card) 63'
CM	2	Charlotte Irankunda
CM	18	Joëlle Bukuru
RW	7	Aniella Uwimana
AM	10	Falone Sumaili	(substituted off) 43'
LW	11	Asha Djafari
CF	9	Sandrine Niyonkuru
Substitutions:
MF	15	Cheilla Ineza	(substituted on) 43'
Manager:
Gustave Niyonkuru

Formation: 4–4–2
GK	16	Sedilame Boseja
RB	14	Veronicah Mogotsi
CB	12	Bonang Otlhagile	(substituted off) 79'
CB	4	Masego Montsho
LB	2	Kesegofetse Mochawe
RM	10	Lesego Radiakanyo	(substituted off) 87'
CM	9	Mokgabo Thanda
CM	6	Golebaone Selebatso	(substituted off) 79'
LM	13	Keitumetse Dithebe	(substituted off) 80'
CF	18	Nondi Mahlasela	(yellow card) 54' (substituted off) 87'
CF	7	Refilwe Tholakele
Substitutions:
MF	11	Thuto Ramafifi	(substituted on) 80'
MF	21	Annah Sechane	(yellow card) 90+3' (substituted on) 79'
DF	8	Lone Gaofetoge	(substituted on) 79'
MF	15	Balotlhanyi Johannes	(yellow card) 90' (substituted on) 87'
FW	19	Esalenna Galekhutle	(substituted on) 87'
Manager:
Gaoletlhoo Nkutlwisang

=== South Africa vs Burundi ===
7 July 2022
18:00

South Africa	3–1	Burundi
Kgatlana 20'; Motau 32'; Motlhalo 54' (pen.)	Report (FIFA); Report (CAF)	Uwimana 30'

Stade Moulay Hassan, Rabat
Referee: Shahenda El-Maghrabi (Egypt)

=== Botswana vs Nigeria ===
7 July 2022
21:00

Botswana	0–2	Nigeria
	Report (FIFA); Report (CAF)	Onumonu 21'; Ucheibe 48'

Stade Moulay Hassan, Rabat
Referee: Letticia Viana (Eswatini)

=== South Africa vs Botswana ===
10 July 2022
21:00

South Africa	1–0	Botswana
Majiya 80'	Report (FIFA); Report (CAF)

Prince Moulay Abdellah Stadium, Rabat
Referee: Dorsaf Ganouati (Tunisia)

=== Nigeria vs Burundi ===
10 July 2022
21:00

Nigeria	4–0	Burundi
Ajibade 25' (pen.); Efih 28'; Kanu 29', 46'	Report (FIFA); Report (CAF)

Stade Moulay Hassan, Rabat
Referee: Fatima El Ajjani (Morocco)

== Discipline ==
Fair play points will be used as tiebreakers in the group if the overall and head-to-head records of teams were tied, or if teams had the same record in the ranking of third-placed teams. These are calculated based on yellow and red cards received in all group matches as follows:

- first yellow card: plus 1 point;
- indirect red card (second yellow card): plus 3 points;
- direct red card: plus 4 points;
- yellow card and direct red card: plus 5 points;

Team	Match 1				Match 2				Match 3				Points
Team	Booked	(yellow card) (yellow-red card)	Sent off (straight red)	(yellow card) (red card)	Booked	(yellow card) (yellow-red card)	Sent off (straight red)	(yellow card) (red card)	Booked	(yellow card) (yellow-red card)	Sent off (straight red)	(yellow card) (red card)	Points
Nigeria	1								2				–3
South Africa					1								–1
Botswana	3				3				2				–8
Burundi	2				1		1		2				–9

== Goalscorers ==
There were 20 goals scored in 6 matches, for an average of 3.33 goals per match.

2 goals

- (Botswana) Refilwe Tholakele
- (Burundi) Sandrine Niyonkuru
- (Nigeria) Rasheedat Ajibade
- (Nigeria) Uchenna Kanu

1 goal

- (Botswana) Keitumetse Dithebe
- (Botswana) Lesego Radiakanyo
- (Burundi) Aniella Uwimana
- (Nigeria) Peace Efih
- (Nigeria) Ifeoma Onumonu
- (Nigeria) Christy Ucheibe
- (South Africa) Thembi Kgatlana
- (South Africa) Hildah Magaia
- (South Africa) Nthabiseng Majiya
- (South Africa) Amogelang Motau
- (South Africa) Linda Motlhalo
- (South Africa) Jermaine Seoposenwe
