= List of Botswana women's international footballers =

This is a list of Botswana women's international footballers who have played for the Botswana women's national football team.

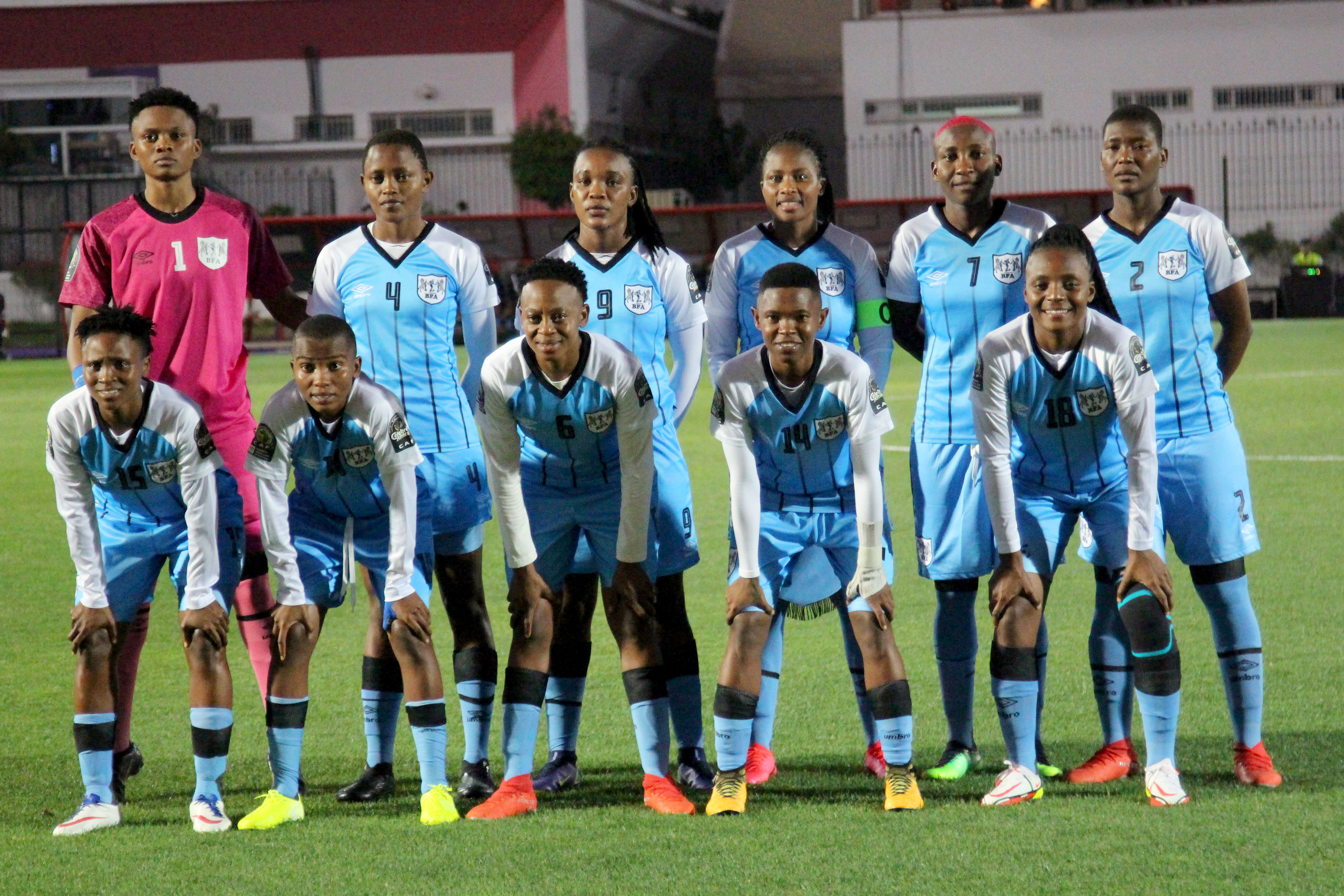
The Mares starting XI at the 2022 Women's Africa Cup of Nations in Morocco against Nigeria.

== Players ==
Player	Position	Years active	Goals
Michelle Abueng	FW		
Nancy Baeletsi	MF		
Oteng Bonang	DF		
Sedilame Boseja	GK		
Atang Busang	FW		
Keitumetse Dithebe	FW		
Esalenna Galekhutle	MF		
Boitumelo Gammu	DF		
Lone Gaofetoge	DF		
Balotlhanyi Johannes	FW		
Lesego Keleboge	FW		
Desiree Kenyaditswe	DF		
Thuso Lesaane			
Nondi Mahlasela	FW		
Nolofatso Mamela	FW		
Peggy Manewe	FW		
Jessica Maponga	FW		
Refilwe Mathlo			
Kesegofetse Mochawe	DF		
Lesego Moeng	GK		
Jessica Modise	FW		
Yaone Modise	FW		
Veronicah Mogotsi	DF		
Bame Mokibe	GK		
Kgomotso Molefe			
Laone Moloi	MF		
Masego Montsho	DF		
Tshegofatso Mosotho	MF		
Tlamelo Motlhale			
Lorato Motlogelwa	DF		
Doris Motshegwe	GK		
Bame Ngenda			
Gaonyadiwe Ontlametse	FW		
Bonang Otlhagile			
Tlamelo Pheresi	GK		
Leungo Senwelo	MF		
Lesego Radiakanyo	FW		
Thuto Ramafifi			
Oratile Rathari	MF		
Obonetse Rathari	MF		
Neo Repito	DF		
Annah Nametso Sechane	MF		
Golebaone Selebatso	MF		
Dimpho Senwelo	FW		
Lebogang Setereke			
Mokgabo Thanda	DF		
Precious Tlhapi	MF		
Refilwe Tholekele	FW		

== See also ==
- Botswana women's national football team
