= Imane Abdelahad =

Moroccan footballer (born 1994)

Personal information
- Date of birth: 21 July 1994 (age 32)
- Place of birth: Fez, Morocco
- Position: Goalkeeper

Team information
- Current team: SC Casablanca
- Number: 21

Senior career*
Years	Team	Apps	(Gls)
2018–	Beşiktaş	6	(0)
2021–	SC Casablanca		

International career
2011–	Morocco		
Medal record
Representing Morocco
Women's Africa Cup of Nations
Second place	2022 Morocco
- * Club domestic league appearances and goals

Imane Abdelahad (Arabic: إيمان عبد الأحد, born 21 July 1994) is a Moroccan footballer who plays as a goalkeeper for SC Casablanca and the Morocco women's national team.

== Club career ==
Abdelahad began her football career at the age of 15 with Wydad AC. She played in the 2017-18 Turkish Women's First League season for Beşiktaş J.K. appearing in six matches of the league's second half. She then returned to Morocco and played a season with Ain Atiq and two seasons with Ittihad Tangiers before joining SC Casablanca. On 14 November 2023, Abdelahad was nominated for the 2023 Goalkeeper of the Year by CAF.

== International career ==
Since 2011, Abdelahad has regularly been called up to the national team as a second or third goalkeeper. She has been called up for a number of training camps and has started several friendlies. She was selected as the reserve goalkeeper for Khadija Ar-Rmchi at the 2021 Aisha Bukhari Cup, as well as the 2022 Women's Africa Cup of Nations. She was selected for several friendlies in the run-up to the 2023 Women's World Cup but did not make the final squad.

== Honours ==
SC Casablanca

- UNAF Women's Champions League: 2023
- CAF Women's Champions League runner-up: 2023

Morocco

- Women's Africa Cup of Nations runner-up: 2022
