= Assia Zouhair =

Moroccan footballer (born 1991)

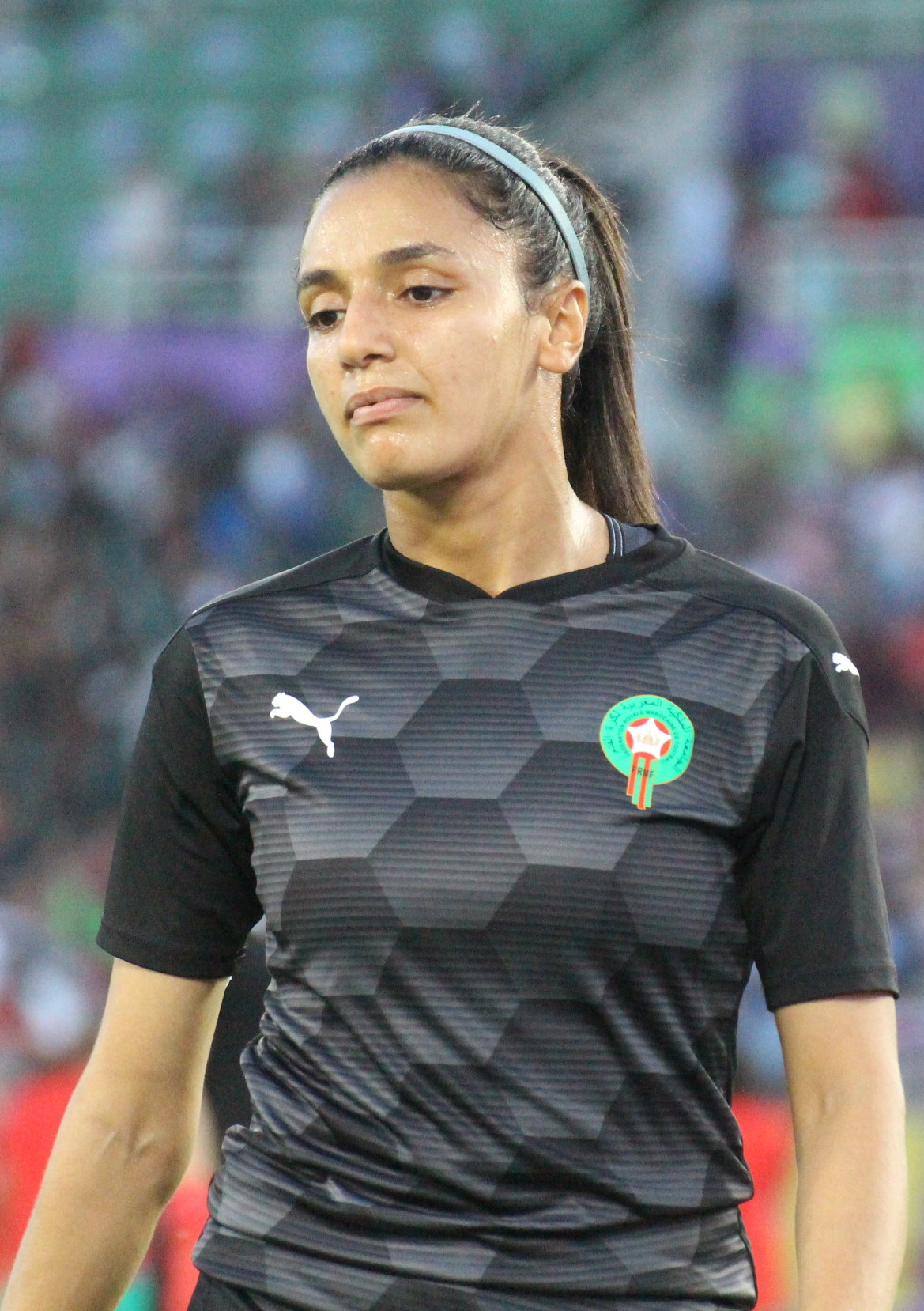
- Zouhair with Morocco at the 2022 Women's Africa Cup of Nations

Personal information
- Date of birth: 30 April 1991 (age 35)
- Place of birth: Rabat, Morocco
- Height: 1.71 m (5 ft 7 in)
- Position: Goalkeeper

Team information
- Current team: Chabab Mohammédia

Senior career*
Years	Team	Apps	(Gls)
2019–2021	CA Khénifra		
2021–	Chabab Mohammédia		

International career^{‡}
2016–	Morocco	10	(0)
Medal record
Representing Morocco
Women's Africa Cup of Nations
Second place	2022 Morocco
- * Club domestic league appearances and goals ‡ National team caps and goals as of 5 December 2023

Assia Zouhair (Arabic: آسِيَة زُهَيْر, born 30 April 1991) is a Moroccan professional footballer who plays as a goalkeeper for Chabab Mohammédia and the Morocco women's national team.

== Club career ==
Zouhair began her career in the Moroccan Women's Championship with AS FAR. She then played three seasons with CA Khénifra in Morocco, beginning in 2009. She won the Throne Cup with CAK in 2010-11 and 2011–12. The team was runners-up in the Championship both years. She then played respectively with Wydad AC, then Raja CA, and CM Layounne, which she joined in 2017. She had a short experience in Turkey with Konak Belediyespor. She returned to CA Khénifra in 2019 and reached the final of the 2018-19 Throne Cup. She joined SCC Mohammedia in the summer of 2021. She was the Player of the Month for the club in November 2022.

== International career ==
Zouhair has capped for Morocco at senior level. She is often the backup goalkeeper for Khadija Er-Rmchi.

Zouhair was selected by Karim Bencherifa for the 2017 COTIF Women's Football Tournament in Spain in which Morocco played against various Spanish and French clubs. She played as a sub against Albi and started against Valencia. She also participated in the 2018 COTIF tournament.

Zouhair was in the list of 26 players that were called up by Reynald Pedros to represent Morocco at the 2022 Africa Cup of Nations, though did not play any matches at the tournament. She started two friendlies against Ireland during Morocco's run-up to the World Cup in November 2022.

She remained with the Morocco national team for both qualifying and the 2023 Women's World Cup. She did not appear in any of Morocco's games in the group stage or in their round of 16 elimination.

== Honours ==
CA Khénifra

- Moroccan Women Throne Cup: 2011, 2012

Morocco

- Women's Africa Cup of Nations runner-up: 2022

== See also ==
- List of Morocco women's international footballers
