= Mariem Chedad =

Mauritanian football referee (born 1995)

Mariem Chedad (Arabic: مريم شداد; born 1995) is a Mauritanian football referee.

Chedad was born in Kherson, Ukraine to a Ukrainian mother and Mauritanian father. Chedad studied logistics at university.

Chedad has been described as "considered as one of the best assistant referees at the Mauritanian level... refereeing of several decisive matches, including the final of the 2021 U-20 Africa Cup of Nations". She also refereed at the 2022 Women's Africa Cup of Nations.
