= Bonang Otlhagile =

Motswana footballer (born 1986)

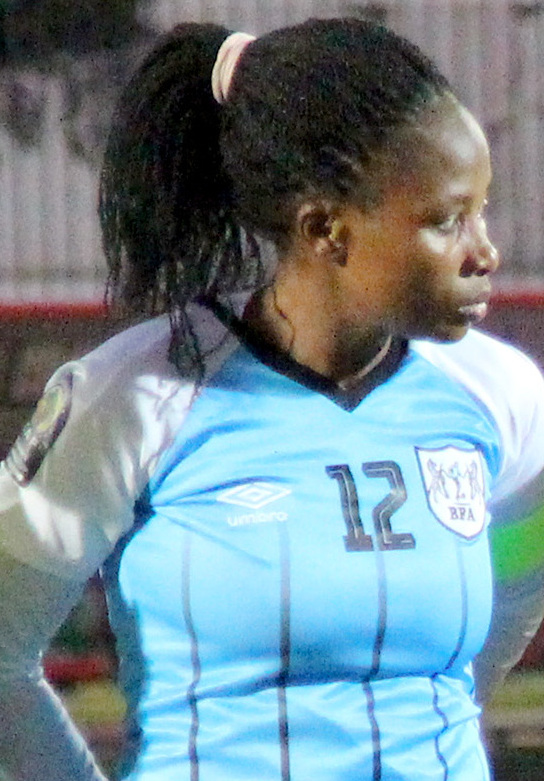
- Otlhagile before Botswana's match against Nigeria at the 2022 Women's Africa Cup of Nations

Personal information
- Full name: Bonang Otlhagile
- Date of birth: 7 August 1986 (age 40)
- Height: 1.60 m (5 ft 3 in)
- Position: Defender

International career
Years	Team	Apps	(Gls)
- Botswana

Bonang Otlhagile (born 7 August 1986) is a Motswana former footballer who played as a defender. She represented the Botswana women's national football team, and spent much of her career playing domestic football. Otlhagile was recognised for her defensive leadership, longevity and commitment to the growth of women's football in Botswana.

A long-serving member of the Botswana national team, Otlhagile represented the country in regional and continental competitions, including the 2022 Women's Africa Cup of Nations, Botswana's first appearance at the tournament. She also captained club sides in the Botswana Women's Championship and became one of the country's most respected women's footballers.

== Early life ==
She was born on 7 August 1986 and developed an interest in football at a young age before establishing herself in Botswana's domestic women's game. Throughout her playing career, Otlhagile became known for balancing football with family life. Following the birth of her child, she returned to competitive football and later spoke publicly about the challenges faced by women footballers who become mothers. She has encouraged clubs and football administrators to provide greater support for players during pregnancy and motherhood.

== Club career ==
Otlhagile played for several clubs in Botswana's women's football league during a career spanning more than two decades. She became one of the country's most experienced defenders and captained her club while helping promote the development of women's football nationally.

In 2021, Otlhagile was named in the squad for the inaugural CAF Women's Champions League COSAFA qualifiers. However, she was unable to travel with her club after suffering an injury shortly before departure, ending hopes of appearing in the historic competition.

Her performances at club level earned repeated national team call-ups and established her as one of Botswana's most dependable defenders. She remained an influential figure both on and off the pitch, mentoring younger players while continuing to compete at the highest level of women's football in Botswana.

== International career ==
Otlhagile made her senior debut for the Botswana women's national team as a teenager. During that period she played in several positions before establishing herself as a central defender, becoming one of Botswana's most experienced internationals and serving as team captain.

As captain, Otlhagile helped lead Botswana through the qualification campaign for the 2022 Women's Africa Cup of Nations, where the Mares secured their first appearance at the continental finals after defeating Zimbabwe on the away goals rule in the final qualifying round. The achievement marked a milestone in the history of women's football in Botswana.

Ahead of the tournament, Otlhagile was named captain of Botswana's squad by head coach Gaoletlhoo Nkutlwisang. At 35 years of age, she was the oldest player in the team and one of its most experienced members.

Otlhagile started all three of Botswana's matches at the tournament, playing 222 minutes as the Mares made their Women's Africa Cup of Nations debut. Botswana recorded a historic 4–2 victory over Burundi, the country's first ever win at the finals, before exiting in the group stage.

Following the tournament, Otlhagile sustained an injury that ruled her out of Double Action Ladies' campaign in the COSAFA qualifying tournament for the CAF Women's Champions League.

In 2023, Otlhagile announced that she would retire from international football after representing Botswana at the 2023 COSAFA Women's Championship. She described the tournament as an opportunity to conclude her national team career while allowing younger players to take on greater responsibility within the squad.

== Post-retirement ==
Away from the pitch, Otlhagile has been involved in the development of women's football in Botswana. She served as head of women's football for the Footballers Union of Botswana (FUB), where she advocated for improved investment, better working conditions and greater opportunities for women players.

In 2026, she was nominated for the Coach of the Year award at the Vunani Botswana Women Sport Awards in recognition of her contribution to football after transitioning into coaching.

== Personal life ==
In 2000 Otlhagile became engaged to Thapelo Mothus, General Manager of Gaborone United. They ended the relationship after two years, in 2022.

Otlhagile is a mother and has spoken publicly about the challenges women footballers face when balancing professional sport with parenthood. In an interview with FIFPRO, she said becoming a mother did not end her football career and encouraged clubs and football authorities to provide greater support for players during pregnancy and after childbirth.

== Honours ==
Botswana

- COSAFA Women's Championship
  - Runner-up: 2019
