= Theo George =

Motswana footballer

Personal information
- Full name: Theo Pearl George
- Date of birth: 2000 or 2001
- Position: Defender

Team information
- Current team: Wonder Girls

Senior career*
Years	Team	Apps	(Gls)
- Wonder Girls

International career^{‡}
2021–	Botswana	3	(0)
- * Club domestic league appearances and goals ‡ National team caps and goals as of 23 February 2022

Theo Pearl George (born 2000 or 2001) is a Motswana footballer who plays as a defender for Wonder Girls and the Botswana women's national team.

== Club career ==
George has played for Wonder Girls, Prisons Ladies Team and Jwaneng Galaxy Ladies Team in Botswana.

== International career ==
George capped for Botswana at senior level during the 2021 COSAFA Women's Championship and the 2022 Africa Women Cup of Nations qualification.
