= 2022 Women's Africa Cup of Nations =

14th edition of the WAFCON

كأس الأمم الإفريقية للسيدات 2022; Coupe d'Afrique des nations féminine 2022
- Official logo

Tournament details
- Host country: Morocco
- Dates: 2–23 July
- Teams: 12
- Venues: 3 (in 2 host cities)

Final positions
- Champions: South Africa (1st title)
- Runners-up: Morocco
- Third place: Zambia
- Fourth place: Nigeria

Tournament statistics
- Matches played: 28
- Goals scored: 63 (2.25 per match)
- Top scorer(s): (Morocco) Ghizlane Chebbak (Nigeria) Rasheedat Ajibade (South Africa) Hildah Magaia (3 goals each)
- Best player: (Morocco) Ghizlane Chebbak
- Best goalkeeper: (South Africa) Andile Dlamini
- Fair play award: South Africa

The 2022 Women's Africa Cup of Nations (Arabic: كأس الأمم الإفريقية للسيدات 2022, French: Coupe d'Afrique des nations féminine 2022), (also referred to as WAFCON 2022) officially known as the 2022 TotalEnergies Women's Africa Cup of Nations for sponsorship purposes, was the 14th edition of the biennial African international women's football tournament organized by the Confederation of African Football (CAF), hosted by Morocco from 2 to 23 July 2022.

The tournament also doubled as the African qualifiers for the 2023 FIFA Women's World Cup. The top four teams qualified for the World Cup, and two more teams advanced to the inter-confederation play-offs.

Nigeria were the three-time defending champions, having won the previous 3 editions in 2014, 2016 and 2018; but had its journey ended in the semi-finals after losing to the hosts Morocco on penalties, making it the first time that neither Nigeria nor Equatorial Guinea featured in the final. The hosts went on to lose in the final to South Africa, which claimed its first ever continental trophy after five previous attempts. With this triumph, South Africa joined Nigeria as the only countries to have won both the men's and women's competition.

This was the first edition to feature 12 teams as the 2020 edition, which would have been the first, was cancelled due to the COVID-19 pandemic in Africa. The Morocco vs Nigeria semi-final broke the WAFCON attendance records with 45,562 spectators.

== Host selection ==
Morocco were announced as hosts on 15 January 2021. This is the first time a North African Arab country has hosted the Women's Africa Cup of Nations.

== Mascot ==
The mascot for this edition of the tournament was unveiled as "TITRIT" (a Moroccan Berber name meaning "star" or "celebrity"), a young lioness clothed with the home jersey of the host nation's national football team, with a traditional Moroccan tiara.

== Qualification ==
Morocco qualified automatically as hosts, while the remaining eleven spots were determined by the qualifying rounds.

=== Qualified teams ===
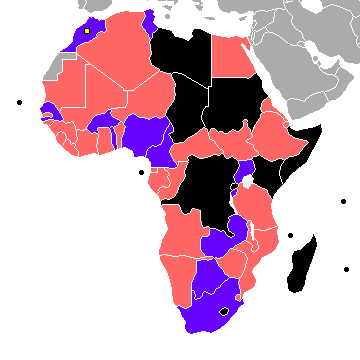
Qualified Did not qualify Did not enter or withdrew Not part of CAF

Team	Finals appearance	Last appearance	Date of qualification	Previous best performance	Previous World Cup appearances	FIFA ranking at start of event
Morocco (hosts)	3rd	2000	15 January 2021	Group stage (1998, 2000)	0	77
Uganda	2nd	2000	28 January 2022	Group stage (2000)	0	156
Burundi	1st	—	21 February 2022	Debut	0	169
Zambia	4th	2018	22 February 2022	Quarter finals (1995)	0	103
Senegal	2nd	2012	22 February 2022	Group stage (2012)	0	89
Togo	1st	—	23 February 2022	Debut	0	118
Nigeria	14th	2018	23 February 2022	Champions (1991, 1995, 1998, 2000, 2002, 2004, 2006, 2010, 2014, 2016, 2018)	8	39
Tunisia	2nd	2008	23 February 2022	Group stage (2008)	0	72
Burkina Faso	1st	—	23 February 2022	Debut	0	138
Botswana	1st	—	23 February 2022	Debut	0	152
Cameroon	13th	2018	23 February 2022	Runners-up (1991, 2004, 2014, 2016)	2	54
South Africa	13th	2018	23 February 2022	Runners-up (1995, 2000, 2008, 2012, 2018)	1	58

== Venues ==
The tournament was held in Casablanca and Rabat.

Morocco	Rabat		Casablanca
2022 Women's Africa Cup of Nations is located in Morocco	Prince Moulay Abdellah Stadium	Stade Moulay Hassan	Stade Mohammed V
2022 Women's Africa Cup of Nations is located in Morocco	Capacity: 50,000	Capacity: 12,000	Capacity: 45,891

== Match officials ==
A total of 16 referees, 16 assistant referees and 8 VAR referees were appointed for the tournament.

Originally, Fatima El Ajjani (Morocco) was assigned as video assistant referee only. However, she was assigned as principal referee during the tournament after Aïssata Boudy Lam (Mauritania) sustained an injury.

Referees

- (Burundi) Suavis Iratunga
- (Ivory Coast) Zomadre Kore
- (Egypt) Shahenda El Maghrabi
- (Eswatini) Letticia Viana
- (Ethiopia) Lidya Tafesse
- (Mauritius) Maria Rivet
- (Mauritania) Aïssata Boudy Lam
- (Morocco) Fatima El Ajjani
- (Morocco) Bouchra Karboubi
- (Namibia) Antsino Twanyanyukwa
- (Nigeria) Patience Ndidi
- (Rwanda) Salima Mukansanga
- (Senegal) Mame Faye
- (South Africa) Akhona Makalima
- (Togo) Vincentia Amedome
- (Tunisia) Dorsaf Ganouati
- (Uganda) Shamirah Nabadda

Assistant referees

- (Algeria) Asma Ouahab
- (Benin) Nafissatou Yekini
- (Cameroon) Carine Atezambong
- (Democratic Republic of the Congo) Kanjinga Mujanayi
- (Egypt) Yara Abdelfattah
- (Egypt) Mona Atallah
- (Madagascar) Lidwine Rakotozafinoro
- (Malawi) Bernadettar Kwimbira
- (Mali) Fanta Kone
- (Mauritius) Queency Victoire
- (Mauritania) Mariem Chedad
- (Morocco) Soukaina Hamdi
- (Morocco) Fatiha Jermoumi
- (Nigeria) Mimisen Iyorhe
- (Tunisia) Afine Houda
- (Zambia) Diana Chikotesha

Video assistant referees

- (Algeria) Lahlou Benbraham
- (Egypt) Ahmed El-Ghandour
- (Egypt) Ahmed Ibrahim
- (Mauritius) Ahmad Heerallal
- (Morocco) Zakaria Brindisi
- (Morocco) Samir Guezzaz
- (Tunisia) Haythem Guirat

== Draw ==
The final draw was held in Rabat, Morocco on 29 April 2022 at 20:30 GMT (UTC±0). The twelve teams were drawn into three groups of four teams, with the hosts Morocco, reigning champions Nigeria, and next-highest-ranked Cameroon assigned to positions A1, C1, and B1, respectively.

Seeds	Pot 1
Morocco (A1); Cameroon (B1); Nigeria (C1)	Togo; Uganda; Zambia; Burundi; Tunisia; Senegal; Botswana; Burkina Faso; South Africa

== Group stage ==
CAF released the official match schedule for the tournament on 29 April 2022. The top two teams of each group, along with the best two third-placed teams, advanced to the quarter-finals.

Tiebreakers

Teams were ranked according to points (3 points for a win, 1 point for a draw, 0 points for a loss).

If two teams were tied on points, the following tiebreaking criteria were applied, in the order given, to determine the rankings (Regulations Article 74):

1. Points in head-to-head matches match between the two tied teams;
2. Goal difference in all group matches;
3. Goals scored in all group matches;
4. Drawing of lots.

If more than two teams were tied, the following criteria were applied instead:

1. Points in matches between the tied teams;
2. Goal difference in matches between the tied teams;
3. Goals scored in matches between the tied teams;
4. If after applying all criteria above, two teams were still tied, the above criteria were again applied to matches played between the two teams in question. If this did not resolve the tie, the next three criteria were applied;
5. Goal difference in all group matches;
6. Goals scored in all group matches;
7. Drawing of lots.

=== Group A ===
Pos	Team	Pld	W	D	L	GF	GA	GD	Pts	Qualification
1	Morocco (H)	3	3	0	0	5	1	+4	9	Knockout stage
2	Senegal	3	2	0	1	3	1	+2	6	Knockout stage
3	Burkina Faso	3	0	1	2	2	4	−2	1	
4	Uganda	3	0	1	2	3	7	−4	1	

Source: CAF (archived)
Rules for classification: Group stage tiebreakers
(H) Hosts
2 July 2022
21:30

Morocco	1–0	Burkina Faso
Chebbak 29'	Report (FIFA); Report (CAF)

Prince Moulay Abdellah Stadium, Rabat
Referee: Salima Mukansanga (Rwanda)
3 July 2022
16:00

Senegal	2–0	Uganda
Diakhaté 39' (pen.); N. Ndiaye 50'	Report (FIFA); Report (CAF)

Prince Moulay Abdellah Stadium, Rabat
Referee: Dorsaf Ganouati (Tunisia)

5 July 2022
18:00

Burkina Faso	0–1	Senegal
	Report (FIFA); Report (CAF)	Fall 84' (pen.)

Prince Moulay Abdellah Stadium, Rabat
Referee: Suavis Iratunga (Burundi)
5 July 2022
21:00

Uganda	1–3	Morocco
Komuntale 32'	Report (FIFA); Report (CAF)	Ayane 14' (pen.); El Chad 68'; Chebbak 84' (pen.)

Prince Moulay Abdellah Stadium, Rabat
Referee: Vincentia Amedome (Togo)

8 July 2022
21:00

Morocco	1–0	Senegal
Chebbak 55' (pen.)	Report (FIFA); Report (CAF)

Prince Moulay Abdellah Stadium, Rabat
Referee: Akhona Makalima (South Africa)
8 July 2022
21:00

Burkina Faso	2–2	Uganda
Congo 35'; Kabré 41'	Report (FIFA); Report (CAF)	Kunihira 8'; Nabweteme 38'

Stade Mohammed V, Casablanca
Referee: Patience Madu (Nigeria)

=== Group B ===
Pos	Team	Pld	W	D	L	GF	GA	GD	Pts	Qualification
1	Zambia	3	2	1	0	5	1	+4	7	Knockout stage
2	Cameroon	3	1	2	0	3	1	+2	5	Knockout stage
3	Tunisia	3	1	0	2	4	4	0	3	Knockout stage
4	Togo	3	0	1	2	3	9	−6	1	

Source: CAF (archived)
Rules for classification: Group stage tiebreakers
3 July 2022
18:00

Cameroon	0–0	Zambia
	Report (FIFA); Report (CAF)

Stade Mohammed V, Casablanca
Referee: Aïssata Boudy Lam (Note: Referee Aïssata Boudy Lam was replaced by fourth official Lidya Tafesse (Ethiopia) due to injury at the 64th minute.) (Mauritania)
3 July 2022
21:00

Tunisia	4–1	Togo
Houij 1'; Ellouzi 12', 60'; Amouklou 71' (o.g.)	Report (FIFA); Report (CAF)	Gnintegma 22' (pen.)

Stade Mohammed V, Casablanca
Referee: Antsino Twanyanyukwa (Namibia)

6 July 2022
18:00

Zambia	1–0	Tunisia
Chitundu 90+2'	Report (FIFA); Report (CAF)

Stade Mohammed V, Casablanca
Referee: Maria Rivet (Mauritius)
6 July 2022
21:00

Togo	1–1	Cameroon
Woedikou 28' (pen.)	Report (FIFA); Report (CAF)	Johnson 38'

Stade Mohammed V, Casablanca
Referee: Zomadre Kore (Ivory Coast)

9 July 2022
21:00

Cameroon	2–0	Tunisia
Abam 3'; Nchout 90'	Report (FIFA); Report (CAF)

Stade Mohammed V, Casablanca
Referee: Lidya Tafesse (Ethiopia)
9 July 2022
21:00

Zambia	4–1	Togo
Chanda 15', 60'; I. Lungu 21'; Mapepa 41'	Report (FIFA); Report (CAF)	Woedikou 35'

Stade Moulay Hassan, Rabat
Referee: Shamira Nabadda (Uganda)

=== Group C ===
Pos	Team	Pld	W	D	L	GF	GA	GD	Pts	Qualification
1	South Africa	3	3	0	0	6	2	+4	9	Knockout stage
2	Nigeria	3	2	0	1	7	2	+5	6	Knockout stage
3	Botswana	3	1	0	2	4	5	−1	3	Knockout stage
4	Burundi	3	0	0	3	3	11	−8	0	

Source: CAF (archived)
Rules for classification: Group stage tiebreakers
4 July 2022
18:00

Nigeria	1–2	South Africa
Ajibade 90+2'	Report (FIFA); Report (CAF)	Seoposenwe 61'; Magaia 63'

Stade Moulay Hassan, Rabat
Referee: Bouchra Karboubi (Morocco)
4 July 2022
21:00

Burundi	2–4	Botswana
Niyonkuru 52', 81'	Report (FIFA); Report (CAF)	Dithebe 43'; Radiakanyo 47'; Tholakele 55', 60'

Stade Moulay Hassan, Rabat
Referee: Mame Faye (Senegal)

7 July 2022
18:00

South Africa	3–1	Burundi
Kgatlana 20'; Motau 32'; Motlhalo 54' (pen.)	Report (FIFA); Report (CAF)	Uwimana 30'

Stade Moulay Hassan, Rabat
Referee: Shahenda El-Maghrabi (Egypt)
7 July 2022
21:00

Botswana	0–2	Nigeria
	Report (FIFA); Report (CAF)	Onumonu 21'; Ucheibe 48'

Stade Moulay Hassan, Rabat
Referee: Letticia Viana (Eswatini)

10 July 2022
21:00

South Africa	1–0	Botswana
Majiya 80'	Report (FIFA); Report (CAF)

Prince Moulay Abdellah Stadium, Rabat
Referee: Dorsaf Ganouati (Tunisia)
10 July 2022
21:00

Nigeria	4–0	Burundi
Ajibade 25' (pen.); Efih 28'; Kanu 29', 46'	Report (FIFA); Report (CAF)

Stade Moulay Hassan, Rabat
Referee: Fatima El Ajjani (Morocco)

=== Ranking of third-placed teams ===
Pos	Grp	Team	Pld	W	D	L	GF	GA	GD	Pts	Qualification
1	B	Tunisia	3	1	0	2	4	4	0	3	Knockout stage
2	C	Botswana	3	1	0	2	4	5	−1	3	Knockout stage
3	A	Burkina Faso	3	0	1	2	2	4	−2	1	

Source: CAF (archived)

== Knockout stage ==
=== Bracket ===
Quarter finals
13 July – Rabat (Moulay Abdellah)
Morocco	2
Botswana	1
14 July – Casablanca
Cameroon	0
Nigeria	1
13 July – Casablanca
Zambia (p)	1 (4)
Senegal	1 (2)
14 July – Rabat (Moulay Hassan)
South Africa	1
Tunisia	0

Semi finals
18 July – Rabat (Moulay Abdellah)
Morocco (p)	1 (5)
Nigeria	1 (4)
18 July – Casablanca
Zambia	0
South Africa	1

Final
23 July – Rabat (Moulay Abdellah)
Morocco	1
South Africa	2
Third place
22 July – Casablanca
Nigeria	0
Zambia	1

Repechage
17 July – Rabat (Moulay Hassan)
Botswana	0
Cameroon	1
17 July – Casablanca
Senegal (p)	0 (4)
Tunisia	0 (2)

=== Quarter-finals ===
The winners qualified for the 2023 FIFA Women's World Cup. The losers entered a repechage round.

13 July 2022
18:00

Zambia	1–1 (a.e.t.)	Senegal
Chitundu 70'	Report (FIFA); Report (CAF)	N. Ndiaye 61'
Penalties
Chanda (penalty scored); Zulu (penalty scored); I. Lungu (penalty scored); Mweemba (penalty missed); Nali (penalty scored)	4–2	(penalty missed) Fall; (penalty scored) Diop; (penalty scored) Baldé; (penalty missed) Diakhaté

Stade Mohammed V, Casablanca
Referee: Bouchra Karboubi (Morocco)

13 July 2022
21:00

Morocco	2–1	Botswana
Mssoudy 3'; Mrabet 59'	Report (FIFA); Report (CAF)	Dithebe 7'

Prince Moulay Abdellah Stadium, Rabat
Referee: Vincentia Amedome (Togo)

14 July 2022
18:00

Cameroon	0–1	Nigeria
	Report (FIFA); Report (CAF)	Ajibade 56'

Stade Mohammed V, Casablanca
Referee: Akhona Makalima (South Africa)

14 July 2022
21:00

South Africa	1–0	Tunisia
Seoposenwe 14'	Report (FIFA); Report (CAF)

Stade Moulay Hassan, Rabat
Referee: Salima Mukansanga (Rwanda)

=== Repechage ===
The winners advanced to the inter-confederation play-offs.

17 July 2022
18:00

Senegal	0–0	Tunisia
	Report (FIFA); Report (CAF)
Penalties
Diop (penalty scored); Diallo (penalty missed); Sow (penalty scored); N. Ndiaye (penalty scored); Fall (penalty scored)	4–2	(penalty scored) Ellouzi; (penalty missed) Houij; (penalty missed) Ayadi; (penalty scored) Aouni

Stade Mohammed V, Casablanca
Referee: Letticia Viana (Eswatini)

17 July 2022
21:00

Botswana	0–1	Cameroon
	Report (FIFA); Report (CAF)	Nchout 45+1'

Stade Moulay Hassan, Rabat
Referee: Suavis Iratunga (Burundi)

=== Semi-finals ===
18 July 2022
18:00

Zambia	0–1	South Africa
	Report (FIFA); Report (CAF)	Motlhalo 90+4' (pen.)

Stade Mohammed V, Casablanca
Referee: Lidya Tafesse (Ethiopia)

18 July 2022
21:00

Morocco	1–1 (a.e.t.)	Nigeria
Mssoudy 66'	Report (FIFA); Report (CAF)	Mrabet 62' (o.g.)
Penalties
Mrabet (penalty scored); Chebbak (penalty scored); Redouani (penalty scored); El Chad (penalty scored); Ayane (penalty scored)	5–4	(penalty scored) Chikwelu; (penalty missed) Onumonu; (penalty scored) Otu; (penalty scored) Plumptre; (penalty scored) Monday

Prince Moulay Abdellah Stadium, Rabat
Attendance: 45,562
Referee: Maria Rivet (Mauritius)

=== Third place play-off ===
22 July 2022
21:00

Nigeria	0–1	Zambia
	Report (FIFA); Report (CAF)	Nnadozie 29' (o.g.)

Stade Mohammed V, Casablanca
Referee: Vincentia Amedome (Togo)

=== Final ===
23 July 2022
21:00

Morocco	1–2	South Africa
Ayane 80'	Report (FIFA); Report (CAF)	Magaia 63', 71'

Prince Moulay Abdellah Stadium, Rabat
Attendance: 50,000
Referee: Salima Mukansanga (Rwanda)

== Goalscorers ==
There were 63 goals scored in 28 matches, for an average of 2.25 goals per match.

3 goals

- (Morocco) Ghizlane Chebbak
- (Nigeria) Rasheedat Ajibade
- (South Africa) Hildah Magaia

2 goals

- (Botswana) Keitumetse Dithebe
- (Botswana) Refilwe Tholakele
- (Burundi) Sandrine Niyonkuru
- (Cameroon) Ajara Nchout
- (Morocco) Rosella Ayane
- (Morocco) Sanaâ Mssoudy
- (Nigeria) Uchenna Kanu
- (Senegal) Nguenar Ndiaye
- (South Africa) Linda Motlhalo
- (South Africa) Jermaine Seoposenwe
- (Togo) Mafille Woedikou
- (Tunisia) Sabrine Ellouzi
- (Zambia) Grace Chanda
- (Zambia) Avell Chitundu

1 goal

- (Botswana) Lesego Radiakanyo
- (Burkina Faso) Adama Congo
- (Burkina Faso) Adèle Kabré
- (Burundi) Aniella Uwimana
- (Cameroon) Michaela Abam
- (Cameroon) Estelle Johnson
- (Morocco) Nesryne El Chad
- (Morocco) Yasmin Mrabet
- (Nigeria) Peace Efih
- (Nigeria) Ifeoma Onumonu
- (Nigeria) Christy Ucheibe
- (Senegal) Ndeye Awa Diakhaté
- (Senegal) Korka Fall
- (South Africa) Thembi Kgatlana
- (South Africa) Nthabiseng Majiya
- (South Africa) Amogelang Motau
- (Togo) Odette Gnintegma
- (Tunisia) Mariem Houij
- (Uganda) Sumaya Komuntale
- (Uganda) Margret Kunihira
- (Uganda) Sandra Nabweteme
- (Zambia) Ireen Lungu
- (Zambia) Siomara Mapepa

1 own goal

- (Morocco) Yasmin Mrabet (against Nigeria)
- (Nigeria) Chiamaka Nnadozie (against Zambia)
- (Togo) Amé Amouklou (against Tunisia)

== Awards ==
The following awards were given at the conclusion of the tournament:

Award	Winner
Best player	(Morocco) Ghizlane Chebbak
Best goalkeeper	(South Africa) Andile Dlamini
Top scorer	(Morocco) Ghizlane Chebbak (Nigeria) Rasheedat Ajibade (South Africa) Hildah Magaia
Fair Play	South Africa

Best XI
Goalkeeper	Defenders	Midfielders	Forwards
(South Africa) Andile Dlamini	(Morocco) Zineb Redouani; (Nigeria) Osinachi Ohale; (South Africa) Bambanani Mbane; (Zambia) Margaret Belemu	(Morocco) Ghizlane Chebbak; (South Africa) Refiloe Jane; (Zambia) Grace Chanda	(Morocco) Fatima Tagnaout; (Nigeria) Rasheedat Ajibade; (South Africa) Jermaine Seoposenwe

== Qualified teams for the 2023 FIFA Women's World Cup ==
The following teams represented Africa directly at the 2023 FIFA Women's World Cup.

Team	Qualified on	Previous appearances in FIFA Women's World Cup^{1}
Zambia	13 July 2022	0 (debut)
Morocco	13 July 2022	0 (debut)
Nigeria	14 July 2022	8 (1991, 1995, 1999, 2003, 2007, 2011, 2015, 2019)
South Africa	14 July 2022	1 (2019)

^{1} Bold indicates champions for that year. Italic indicates hosts for that year.
