= Siomala Mapepa =

Zambian footballer (born 2002)

Personal information
- Full name: Siomala Mapepa
- Date of birth: 4 June 2002 (age 24)
- Place of birth: Zambia
- Position: Forward

Senior career*
Years	Team	Apps	(Gls)
- Elite Ladies
2024	Galatasaray	4	(0)

International career^{‡}
2022–	Zambia	8	(1)
- * Club domestic league appearances and goals ‡ National team caps and goals as of 20 July 2023

Siomala Mapepa (also spelled Xiomala or Ziomala, born 4 June 2002) is a Zambian footballer who plays as a forward for the Galatasaray club and the Zambia women's national football team.

== International career ==
So far, she has made eight appearances for the national team, including five at the 2022 Women's Africa Cup of Nations, where she scored a goal against Togo. She also played at the 2023 FIFA Women's World Cup.

== Honours ==
Zambia

- COSAFA Women's Championship: 2022
