= Sumaya Komuntale =

Ugandan footballer (born 2003)

Personal information
- Date of birth: 3 August 2003 (age 23)
- Position: Left back

Team information
- Current team: Yanga Princess

Senior career*
Years	Team	Apps	(Gls)
- Tooro Queens FC
-2026	KCCA Women FC		
2026	She Corporate FC		
2026-	Yanga Princess		

International career^{‡}
2021–	Uganda	2	(0)
- * Club domestic league appearances and goals ‡ National team caps and goals as of 26 October 2021.

Sumaya Komuntale (born 3 August 2003), also spelled Sumayah Komuntale, is a Ugandan footballer who plays as a left back for Tanzanian club Yanga princess and the Uganda women's national team.

== Early life ==
Komuntale was born and raised in Kyenjojo to Aisha Karungi and Badru Kyakahuma, and belongs to the Tooro people.

== Club career ==
Komuntale has played for Tooro Queens, KCCA Women FC and She Corporate FC in Uganda before joining Yanga Princess in August 2026.

== International career ==
Komuntale capped for Uganda at senior level during the 2022 Africa Women Cup of Nations qualification.
