= Masego Montsho =

Motswana footballer

Personal information
- Date of birth: 15 June 1991 (age 35)
- Height: 1.75 m (5 ft 9 in)
- Position: Defender

Team information
- Current team: BDF XI

Senior career*
| Years | Team | Apps | (Gls) |
- BDF XI

International career
- Botswana
- * Club domestic league appearances and goals

Masego Montsho (born 15 June 1991) is a Motswana footballer who plays as a defender for Botswana Defence Force XI FC and the Botswana women's national team.

== Club career ==
Montsho has played for Botswana Defence Force XI in Botswana.

== International career ==
Montsho capped for Botswana at senior level during the 2016 Africa Women Cup of Nations qualification and the 2021 COSAFA Women's Championship.

== See also ==
- List of Botswana women's international footballers
