= Thuto Ramafifi =

Motswana footballer (born 1992)

Thuto Oaboloka Ramafifi
- Born: 9 January 1992 (age 34)
- Citizenship: Botswana
- Occupation: Motswana Footballer
- Known for: Being the top scorer of the NCAA Division II with twenty-six goals

Thuto Oaboloka Ramafifi (born 9 January 1992) is a Motswana footballer who plays as a striker.

== Early life ==
Ramafifi played netball at a young age.

== Education ==
Ramafifi attended Ledumang Senior Secondary School in Botswana.

== Club career ==
Plying for Albany State University, Ramafifi has been the top scorer of the NCAA Division II with twenty-six goals.

== International career ==
Ramafifi played for the Botswana women's national football team for the 2022 Women's Africa Cup of Nations qualification.

== Style of play ==
Ramafifi mainly operates as a striker and has been described as "modeling her style of play on Portuguese icon Cristiano Ronaldo.

== Managerial career ==
Ramfifi attended a preliminary FIFA coaching course in Namibia and a Premier Skills coaching course in Botswana.

== Personal life ==
Ramfifi is a native of Gaborone, Botswana.
