= Nondi Mahlasela =

Motswana footballer

Personal information
- Full name: Nondi Fingi Mahlasela
- Date of birth: 25 December 1991 (age 34)
- Height: 1.60 m (5 ft 3 in)
- Position: Forward

Team information
- Current team: Prison

Senior career*
| Years | Team | Apps | (Gls) |
- Prison

International career
- Botswana
- * Club domestic league appearances and goals

Nondi Mahlasela (born 25 December 1991) is a Motswana footballer who plays as a forward for Prison and the Botswana women's national team.

== See also ==
- List of Botswana women's international footballers
