= Lone Gaofetoge =

Motswana footballer (born 2001)

Personal information
- Date of birth: 16 July 2001 (age 25)
- Position: Defender

Team information
- Current team: Gaborone United Ladies
- Number: 8

Senior career*
Years	Team	Apps	(Gls)
2015	Wonder Girls		
2016	Geronah		
- Lusaka Dynamos
2024	Hakkarigücü	11	(0)
2025	Amed	11	(1)
2025–	Gaborone United Ladies		

International career
2020–	Botswana	18	(1)
- * Club domestic league appearances and goals as of 4 May 2025

Lone Gaofetoge (born 16 July 2001) is a Botswana women's football defender who plays for Gaborone United Ladies in the Botswana Women's Championship, and the Botswana women's national team.

== Club career ==
In 2015, Gaofetoge made her debut for Wonder Girls at age 14, coming on as a second-half substitute in a league match against Makufa FC and scoring a hat-trick to lead a 3–2 comeback win. She joined Girona FC in 2016 and later signed with Zambian side Lusaka Dynamos.

In September 2024, Lone Gaofetoge moved to Turkey, and joined Hakkarigücü to play in the Super League. In the second half of the |2024–25 Turkish Super League season, she transferred to Amed in Diyarbakır.

== Career statistics ==
As of match played 4 May 2025.

Club	Season	League			Continental		National		Total	
Club	Season	Division	Apps	Goals	Apps	Goals	Apps	Goals	Apps	Goals
Hakkarşgücün	2024–25	Turkish Super League	11	0	–	–			11	0
Amed	2024–25	Turkish Super League	11	1	–	–			11	1
