= Aniella Uwimana =

Burundian footballer

Personal information
- Full name: Aniella Nella Uwimana
- Date of birth: 17 November 1999 (age 27)
- Position: Forward

Team information
- Current team: Yanga Princess

Senior career*
Years	Team	Apps	(Gls)
- Yanga Princess

International career^{‡}
2021–	Burundi	2	(5)
- * Club domestic league appearances and goals ‡ National team caps and goals as of 21 February 2022.

Aniella Nella Uwimana (born 17 November 1999) is a Burundian footballer who plays as a forward for Yanga Princess and Burundi women's national team.
