= Keitumetse Dithebe =

Motswana footballer

Personal information
- Date of birth: 17 July 2002 (age 24)
- Place of birth: Botswana
- Height: 1.70 m (5 ft 7 in)
- Position: Midfielder

Team information
- Current team: Fomget
- Number: 27

Senior career*
Years	Team	Apps	(Gls)
2017–2022	Mexican Girls FC		
2023–2025	Gaborone United		
2025–	Ankara BB Fomget	4	(0)

International career^{‡}
2020–2021	Botswana U20	6	(3)
2021–	Botswana	29	(7)
- * Club domestic league appearances and goals as of 20 April 2025 ‡ National team caps and goals as of 15 July 2024

Keitumetse Dithebe known as Keitumetse 'Ben 10' Dithebe (born 17 July 2002) is a Motswana footballer who plays as a midfielder for Turkish Women's Football Super League club Ankara BB Fomget and the Botswana women's national team.

== Club career ==
On 20 January 2023, Gaborone United announced the signing of Keitumetse Dithebe from Mexican Girls on a two-and-a-half-year contract.

In August 2024, she participated in the club's inaugural COSAFA Women's Champions League campaign. In the final matchday, ahe was named Woman of the Match for her significant contribution to Gaborone's advancement to the semifinals.

In January 2025, she moved to Turkey, and joined Ankara BB Fomget to play in the 2024–25 Super League season. She won the champions title in that season.

== International career ==
Dithebe made Botswana's final squad for the 2022 Women's Africa Cup of Nations. On 4 July 2022, she scored Botswana's first goal in the competition in a 4–2 win over Burundi.

In 2023, Dithebe scored in both legs of the second round against Kenya securing their ticket for the 2024 Women's Africa Cup of Nations for the second consecutive time.

== Career statistics ==
=== International ===
As of 9 August 2024

Appearances and goals by national team and year
National team	Year	Apps	Goals
Botswana	2021	1	0
Botswana	2022	13	2
Botswana	2023	10	4
Botswana	2024	5	1
Total		29	7

Scores and results list Botswana's goal tally first, score column indicates score after each Dithebe goal.

List of international goals scored by Keitumetse Dithebe
No.	Date	Venue	Opponent	Score	Result	Competition
1	4 July 2022	Stade Moulay Hassan, Rabat, Morocco	Burundi	1–0	4–2	2022 Women's Africa Cup of Nations
2	13 July 2022	Prince Moulay Abdellah Stadium, Rabat, Morocco	Morocco	1–1	1–2	2022 Women's Africa Cup of Nations
3	2 July 2023	Tsakane Stadium, Brakpan, South Africa	South Africa	3–0	5–0	Friendly
4	26 September 2023	Lobatse Stadium, Lobatse, Botswana	Gabon	5–0	6–0	2024 Women's Africa Cup of Nations qualification
5	29 November 2023	Nyayo National Stadium, Nairobi, Kenya	Kenya	1–0	1–1	2024 Women's Africa Cup of Nations qualification
6	5 December 2023	Botswana National Stadium, Gaborone, Botswana	Kenya	1–0	1–0	2024 Women's Africa Cup of Nations qualification
7	6 April 2024	Royal Aria Stadium, Tlokweng, Botswana	Lesotho	2–0	2–1	Friendly

== Honours ==
Turkish Women's Football Super League

Ankara BB Fomget
Champions (1): 2024–25
