= Mokgabo Thanda =

Motswana footballer

Personal information
- Full name: Mokgabo Onneille Thanda
- Date of birth: 3 April 1993 (age 33)
- Position: Midfielder

Team information
- Current team: Yasa

Senior career*
Years	Team	Apps	(Gls)
- Yasa

International career
- Botswana
- * Club domestic league appearances and goals

Mokgabo Onneille Thanda (born 3 April 1993) is a Motswana footballer who plays as a midfielder for Green Buffaloes and the Botswana women's national team.

== Club career ==
Thanda has played for Yasa in Zambia.

== International career ==
Thanda capped for Botswana at senior level during two COSAFA Women's Championship editions (2020, 2021, and 2025).

== See also ==
- List of Botswana women's international footballers
