= Sandrine Niyonkuru =

Burundian footballer

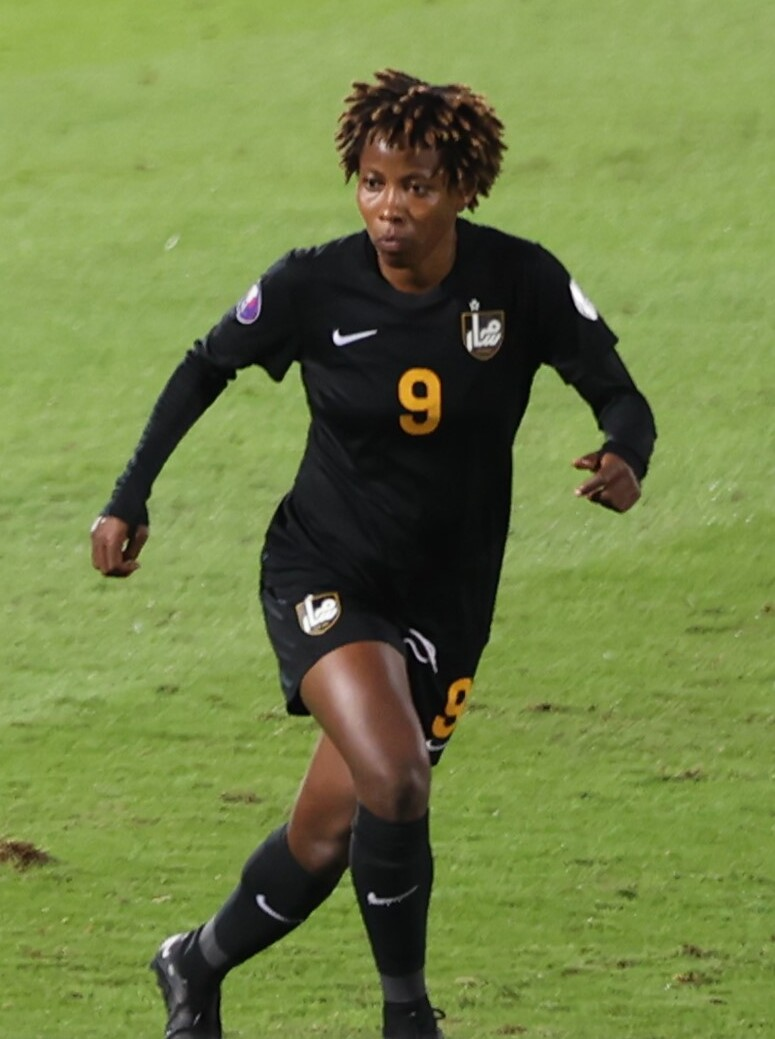
- Niyonkuru with FC Masar during the 2024 CAF Women's Champions League.

Personal information
- Date of birth: 1 January 2000 (age 26)
- Position: Forward

Team information
- Current team: Changchun Dazhong

Senior career*
Years	Team	Apps	(Gls)
- Fofila
- La Colombe
	Fountain Gate Princess	4	(8)
2022–2025	FC Masar	69	(111)
2025–	Changchun Dazhong	32	(16)

International career
2019–	Burundi	16	(12)
- * Club domestic league appearances and goals

Sandrine Niyonkuru (born 1 January 2000) is a Burundian footballer who plays as a forward for Egyptian club Tutankhamun and the Burundi women's national team.

== Club career ==
Niyonkuru has previously played for Tanzanian club Fountaingate Schools. As of 2023, she played for Tutankhamun in the Egyptian Women's Premier League. With Tutankhamun, Niyonkuru scored both goals in the team's 2–1 victory in the 2022/23 Egyptian Ladies FA Cup, the team's first-ever victory in the tournament.

== Career statistics ==
Club	Season	Division	League		Cup		Continental		Others		Total	
Club	Season	Division	Apps	Goals	Apps	Goals	Apps	Goals	Apps	Goals	Apps	Goals
Masar	2022-23	Egyptian Premier League	20	19	3	5					23	24
Masar	2023-24	Egyptian Premier League	30	66							30	66
Masar	2024-25	Egyptian Premier League	19	26			8	7			27	33
Masar	Total		69	111	3	5	8	7			80	123
Changchun Dazhong	2025	Chinese Super League	20	10	2	2					22	12
Changchun Dazhong	2026	Chinese Super League	12	6							12	6
Changchun Dazhong	Total		32	16	2	2					34	18
Total career			101	127	5	7	8	7			115	141

== International career ==
Niyonkuru has capped at a senior level for Burundi. She played with Burundi at the 2019 CECAFA Women's Championship and scored in the opening match, a 5–0 win over Zanzibar. Burundi qualified for the knockout rounds where they lost 5–0 to Kenya.

At the 2022 CECAFA Women's Championship, Niyonkuru scored a brace in her opening match, a 3–0 win over Djibouti, and a second brace in her second match, a 2–1 win over Rwanda. She scored again (on a penalty kick) in Burundi's 2-1 semifinal victory over Tanzania. Burundi lost in the final to Uganda.

She participated in the team's campaign at the 2022 Women's Africa Cup of Nations, their first ever appearance in the tournament. She scored a brace in the final match of the group stage, a 2–4 loss to Botswana.
