= Lesego Radiakanyo =

Motswana footballer

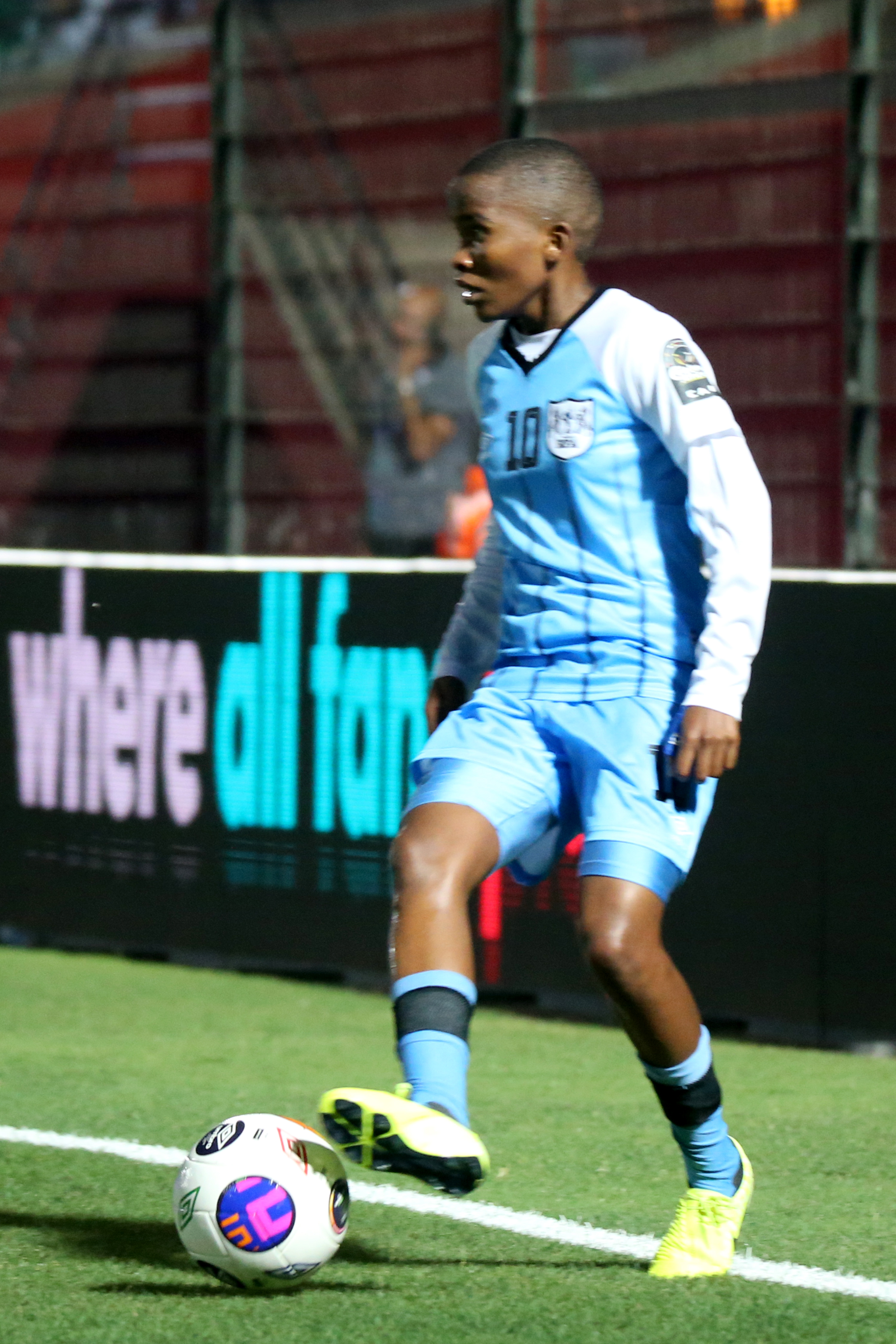
- Radiakanyo in July 2022

Personal information
- Full name: Lesego D. Duduetsang Radiakanyo
- Date of birth: 27 June 1999 (age 27)
- Position: Forward

Team information
- Current team: Double Action

Senior career*
Years	Team	Apps	(Gls)
- Double Action

International career
	Botswana		(1)
- * Club domestic league appearances and goals

Lesego D. Duduetsang Radiakanyo (born 27 June 1999) is a Motswana footballer who plays as a forward for Double Action and the Botswana women's national team.

== International goals ==
No.	Date	Venue	Opponent	Score	Result	Competition
1.	28 May 2025	Lucas Moripe Stadium, Pretoria, South Africa	South Africa	1–3	2–3	Friendly
