= Botswana women's national football team =

Women's national association football team representing Botswana

Botswana
- Nickname(s): The Mares; The Zebras
- Association: Botswana Football Association
- Confederation: CAF (Africa)
- Sub-confederation: COSAFA (Southern Africa)
- Head coach: Basimanebotlhe Malete
- Captain: Sedilame Boseja
- Top scorer: Refilwe Tholakele (16)
- Home stadium: Botswana National Stadium
- FIFA code: BOT
First colours	Second colours	Third colours

FIFA ranking
- Current: 148 ▼1 (16 June 2026)
- Highest: 102 (July 2003)
- Lowest: 154 (December 2021 – March 2022)

First international
- South Africa 14–0 Botswana (Harare, Zimbabwe; April 19, 2002)

Biggest win
- Botswana 7–0 Mauritius (Lobatse, Botswana; March 5, 2016); Botswana 7–0 South Sudan (Port Elizabeth, South Africa; September 29, 2021)

Biggest defeat
- South Africa 14–0 Botswana (Harare, Zimbabwe; April 19, 2002)

World Cup
- Appearances: 0

Olympic Games
- Appearances: 0

Women's Africa Cup of Nations
- Appearances: 2 (first in 2022)
- Best result: Quarter-finals (2022)

The Botswana women's national football team is the women's national football team of Botswana and is controlled by the Botswana Football Association. They qualified for their maiden Women's Africa Cup of Nations tournament 2022 in Morocco where they made it to the quarterfinals.

== History ==
Botswana played their first match in Harare, Zimbabwe on April 19, 2002, against South Africa in a series of friendlies. They lost 14–0. After this match, they lost 3–0 against Swaziland and 7–1 against Mozambique, where they scored their first goal.

Botswana's first major competition was the 2008 African Women's Championship qualification where after 5 years, they played an international match, this time against Namibia. The Mares lost both legs by 3–0 and 6–1.

Botswana played against Zambia on 4 May 2008 and lost 4–2.

With a U20 team, the Zebras played 2010 African Women's Championship qualifiers against Congo DR and again lost both legs, this time by 2–0 and 5–2 and did not qualify for either the 2010 African Women's Championship or the 2011 FIFA Women's World Cup

A series of friendlies occurred in October 2010, against Zambia on 2 and 23 October. They lost 1–4 and 1–2 respectively; against Tanzania on 25 and 26 October, they lost 2–3 and draw 1–1. In the next year, March 2011, they again played against Namibia and lost 1–0.

In 2011, one of the two friendlies in April and May with South Africa marked their first victory, by 1–0. They lost the other match 4–0. In August, they played against Tanzania on 2 August, losing 3–1; South Africa on August 3, losing 4–0 and against Zambia, also losing, 4–1.

They entered the 2012 African Women's Championship qualifiers and played against Zimbabwe, and were eliminated by an aggregate score of 3–1, due to losing the two legs by 1–0 and 2–1. Last friendlies in 2012 included two losses against South Africa (3–0) and Zimbabwe (5–0).

Before the 2014 African Women's Championship qualifiers, the team played the first 2014 matches, against Swaziland on 7 and 8 January and won for the second and third time, by 3–0 and 3–1. The first leg of the qualifiers for the African Championship started on 14 February with a loss against Zimbabwe 1–0 and the second leg was played on 2 March, with another loss, by 2–1. Botswana were eliminated from the African Championship and the World Cup. On June 7 of the same year, they played against South Africa, losing 4–0.

=== Women's Africa Cup of Nations ===
They made their debut at the 2022 Women's Africa Cup of Nations. They won their first match 4-2 against fellow debutants Burundi and lost their next two matches 2-0 against Nigeria and 1-0 against South Africa to finish third in group C. They qualified for the quarterfinals as the second best third ranked team where they lost 2-1 against hosts Morocco.

== Team image ==
=== Home stadium ===
The Botswana women's national football team plays their home matches at the Botswana National Stadium.

== Results and fixtures ==
The following is a list of match results in the last 12 months, as well as any future matches that have been scheduled.

Legend

Win Draw Lose Fixture

=== 2026 ===
19 February 2025 COSAFA Championship	Zambia	3–0	Botswana	Polokwane, South Africa
15:00 UTC+2	Chanda 16'; Banda 45+1'; Mupopo 72'	Report		Stadium: Old Peter Mokaba Stadium; Referee: Nonjabulo Ndlela (South Africa)

22 February 2025 COSAFA Championship	Botswana	1–1	Eswatini	Seshego, South Africa
12:00 UTC+2	Mamela 23'	Report	Mokgale 38'	Stadium: Seshego Stadium; Referee: Mathapelo Morake (Lesotho)

24 February 2025 COSAFA Championship	Zimbabwe	1–0	Botswana	Seshego, South Africa
12:00 UTC+2	Makore 70'	Report		Stadium: Seshego Stadium; Referee: Nonjabulo Ndlela (South Africa)

10 April Friendly	Saudi Arabia	1–1	Botswana	Abha, Saudi Arabia
19:00 UTC+3	Tawfiq 90+5'	Report	Moloi 28'	Stadium: Prince Sultan bin Abdulaziz Sports City Stadium; Referee: Husain Al-Showaikh (Bahrain)

12 April Friendly	Saudi Arabia U20	0–3	Botswana	Taif, Saudi Arabia
18:00 UTC+3		Report	Moloi 55', 86', 89'	Stadium: Reserve Stadium (1) at King Fahd Sports City

26 September Friendly	Botswana	1–1	Namibia
15:00		Report

29 September Friendly	Botswana	4–1	Namibia
11:30		Report

9 October 2026 2028 Olympic Qualification 2nd round	Botswana	0–1	Tanzania	Gaborone, Botswana
19:00 UTC+2		Report	Clement 64'	Stadium: National Stadium; Referee: Yemisi Akintoye (Nigeria)

13 October 2026 2028 Olympic Qualification 2nd round	Tanzania	6–0 (7–0 agg.)	Botswana	Chamazi, Tanzania
16:00 UTC+3	Mnunka 39'; Ubamba 44'; Maseke 60'; Clement 69'; Siyame 74'; Lunyamila 90'	Report		Stadium: Azam Complex Stadium; Referee: Rachel Zihindula (DR Congo)

Source: globalsportsarchive.com

== Coaching staff ==
=== Current coaching staff ===
As of 7 November 2023

Position	Name	Ref.
Head coach	Basimanebotlhe Alex Malete	
Assistant coach	Tapaphiwa Tracy Gaebolae	
Assistant coach	Jacqualine Lorato Gaobinelwe	
Goalkeeper coach	David Puso	
Physician	Kealebogga K. Rakereng	

=== Manager history ===
- (Botswana) Gaoletlhoo Nkutlwisang (2021–2023)
- (Botswana) Basimanebotlhe Alex Malete (2023–)

== Players ==
=== Current squad ===
- The following 24 players were called up for the 2025 COSAFA Women's Championship squads during February 2026.

Caps and goals accurate up to and including 12 July 2025.

No.	Pos.	Player	Date of birth (age)	Club
1	GK	Tshotlhe Mphezulu	3 July 2005 (aged 20)	(Botswana Football Association) Double Action Ladies
2	FW	Mbapeua Hangara	24 September 2006 (aged 19)	(Botswana Football Association) Double Action Ladies
3	DF	Theo George	30 January 2001 (aged 25)	(Botswana Football Association) Jwaneng Galaxy
4	MF	Keotsheohile Kesetse	22 April 2008 (aged 17)	(Botswana Football Association) Double Action Ladies
5	DF	Koketso Molwantwa	12 September 2006 (aged 19)	(Botswana Football Association) Double Action Ladies
6	MF	Dimpho Sedirwa	8 May 2005 (aged 20)	(Botswana Football Association) Double Action Ladies
7	MF	Precious Tlhapi	21 January 2004 (aged 22)	(Botswana Football Association) BDF XI
8	MF	Leungo Senwelo	23 December 2001 (aged 24)	(Botswana Football Association) Mazottie
9	DF	Mokgabo Thanda (Captain)	3 April 1993 (aged 32)	(Football Association of Zambia) Green Buffaloes
10	FW	Peggy Manewe	25 December 2004 (aged 21)	(Botswana Football Association) Double Action Ladies
11	FW	Michelle Abueng	6 May 2001 (aged 24)	(Botswana Football Association) BDF XI
12	FW	Lebogang Dilelo	25 April 2007 (aged 18)	(Botswana Football Association) Dunamis
13	FW	Nolofatso Mamela	21 November 2001 (aged 24)	(Botswana Football Association) Jwaneng Galaxy
14	MF	Bofelo Rantsho	9 April 2003 (aged 22)	(Botswana Football Association) Double Action Ladies
15	DF	Balotlhanyi Johannes	28 June 1994 (aged 31)	(Botswana Football Association) Double Action Ladies
16	GK	Gosego Mokola	22 July 2006 (aged 19)	(Botswana Football Association) Jwaneng Galaxy
17	FW	Oratile Kolobe	28 December 2004 (aged 21)	(Botswana Football Association) Jwaneng Galaxy
18	MF	Hope Lesotlo	15 May 2009 (aged 16)	(Botswana Football Association) Dunamis
19	MF	Laone Moloi	26 November 2000 (aged 25)	(Botswana Football Association) Jwaneng Galaxy
20	DF	Ivy Mankgatau	27 October 2006 (aged 19)	(Botswana Football Association) Orapa All Stars
21	MF	Leano Busang	20 December 1999 (aged 26)	(Botswana Football Association) Gaborone United Ladies
22	DF	Boitumelo Gammu	23 July 1995 (aged 30)	(Namibia Football Association) Ongos
23	GK	Obuisitse Letebele	10 July 1996 (aged 29)	(Botswana Football Association) Security Systems
24	FW	Kelebogile Magaga	8 April 1997 (aged 28)	(Botswana Football Association) Township Rollers

=== Recent call-ups ===
The following players have been called up to a Botswana squad in the past 12 months.

Pos.	Player	Date of birth (age)	Caps	Goals	Club	Latest call-up

=== Previous squads ===
Africa Women Cup of Nations

- 2022 Women's Africa Cup of Nations squads

COSAFA Women's Championship

- 2020 COSAFA Women's Championship squad
- 2022 COSAFA Women's Championship squad
- 2023 COSAFA Women's Championship squad

== Records ==
- Active players in **bold**, statistics correct as of 2020.

=== Most capped players ===
#	Player	Year(s)	Caps

=== Top goalscorers ===
#	Player	Year(s)	Goals	Caps

== Honours ==
=== Regional ===
- **COSAFA Women's Championship**

Runners-up: 2020

== Competitive record ==
=== FIFA Women's World Cup ===
FIFA Women's World Cup record
Year	Result	GP	W	D*	L	GF	GA	GD
(China) 1991	Did not enter							
(Sweden) 1995	Did not enter							
(United States) 1999	Did not enter							
(United States) 2003	Did not enter							
(China) 2007	Did not enter							
(Germany) 2011	Did not qualify							
(Canada) 2015	Did not qualify							
(France) 2019	Did not qualify							
(Australia) (New Zealand) 2023	Did not qualify							
(Brazil) 2027	Did not qualify							
(Mexico) (United States) 2031	To be determined							
(United Kingdom) 2035	To be determined							
**Total**	0/12	-	-	-	-	-	-	-

*Draws include knockout matches decided on penalty kicks.

=== Olympic Games ===
Summer Olympics record
Year	Result	Matches	Wins	Draws	Losses	GF	GA
(United States) 1996	Did Not Enter						
(Australia) 2000	Did Not Enter						
(Greece) 2004	Did Not Enter						
(China) 2008	Did Not Enter						
(United Kingdom) 2012	Did Not Qualify						
(Brazil) 2016	Did Not Qualify						
(Japan) 2021	Did Not Qualify						
(France) 2024	Did Not Qualify						
(United States) 2028	Did Not Qualify						
Total	0/9	0	0	0	0	0	0

=== Africa Women Cup of Nations ===
Africa Women Cup of Nations record
Year	Result	Matches	Wins	Draws	Losses	GF	GA
1991	Did not enter						
1995	Did not enter						
(Nigeria) 1998	Did not enter						
(South Africa) 2000	Did not enter						
(Nigeria) 2002	Withdrew						
(South Africa) 2004	Did not enter						
(Nigeria) 2006	Withdrew						
(Equatorial Guinea) 2008	Did not qualify						
(South Africa) 2010	Did not qualify						
(Equatorial Guinea) 2012	Did not qualify						
(Namibia) 2014	Did not qualify						
(Cameroon) 2016	Did not qualify						
(Ghana) 2018	Did not qualify						
(Republic of the Congo) 2020	Cancelled						
(Morocco) 2022	Quarter-finals	5	1	0	4	5	8
(Morocco) 2024	Group stage	3	1	0	2	2	3
(Morocco) 2026	Did not qualify						
Total	2/16	8	2	0	6	7	11

=== African Games ===
African Games record
Year	Result	Matches	Wins	Draws	Losses	GF	GA
(Nigeria) 2003	Did Not Enter						
(Algeria) 2007	Did Not Enter						
(Mozambique) 2011	Did Not Qualify						
(Republic of the Congo) 2015	Did Not Qualify						
(Morocco) 2019	See Botswana women's national under-20 football team						
(Ghana) 2023	See Botswana women's national under-20 football team						
(Egypt) 2027	TBD						
Total	0/5	0	0	0	0	0	0

=== COSAFA Women's Championship ===
COSAFA Women's Championship record
Year	Round	Pld	W	D*	L	GS	GA	GD
(Zimbabwe) 2002	**Group Stage**	3	0	0	3	1	24	−23
(Zambia) 2006	Did not enter							
(Angola) 2008	----							
(Zimbabwe) 2011	**Group Stage**	3	0	0	3	2	11	−9
(Zimbabwe) 2017	**Group Stage**	3	1	1	1	4	5	−1
(South Africa) 2018	**Group Stage**	3	1	1	1	2	1	+1
(South Africa) 2019	**Fourth**	4	2	1	1	4	4	0
(South Africa) 2020	**Runner -up**	4	3	0	1	5	3	+2
(South Africa) 2021	**Group Stage**	3	1	0	2	7	5	+2
(South Africa) 2022	**Group stage**	3	1	2	0	7	1	+6
(South Africa) 2023	**Group stage**	3	1	2	0	5	2	+3
(South Africa) 2024	**Group stage**	3	1	2	0	6	1	+5
(South Africa) 2025	**Group stage**	3	0	1	2	1	5	−4
Total	Runner-up	30	11	10	14	44	62	-18

*Draws include knockout matches decided on penalty kicks.

== All−time record against FIFA recognized nations ==
The list shown below shows the Botswana women's national football team all−time international record against opposing nations.
*As of xxxxxx after match against xxxx.

Key

Positive balance (more wins than losses)
Neutral balance (as many wins as losses)
Negative balance (more losses than wins)

Against	Pld	W	D	L	GF	GA	GD	Confederation

=== Record per opponent ===
*As ofxxxxx after match against xxxxx.

Key

Positive balance (more wins than losses)
Neutral balance (as many wins as losses)
Negative balance (more losses than wins)

The following table shows Botswana's all-time official international record per opponent:

Opponent	Pld	W	D	L	GF	GA	GD	W%	Confederation
Total									—

== See also ==
- Sport in Botswana
  - Football in Botswana
    - Women's football in Botswana
- Botswana women's national under-20 football team
- Botswana women's national under-17 football team
- Botswana men's national football team
