= 2020 COSAFA Women's Championship squads =

List of players competing at the 8th edition of the COSAFA Women's Championship

This article lists the squads for the 2020 COSAFA Women's Championship, the 8th edition of the COSAFA Women's Championship. The tournament is a women's international football tournament for national teams organised by COSAFA, teams from Southern Africa, and was held in Nelson Mandela Bay from 3 to 14 November 2020. In the tournament were involved ten national teams: nine teams from COSAFA and Tanzania, who were invited as guests. Each national team registered a squad of 20 players.

The age listed for each player is on 3 November 2020, the first day of the tournament. The numbers of caps and goals listed for each player do not include any matches played after the start of tournament. The club listed is the club for which the player last played a competitive match prior to the tournament. The nationality for each club reflects the national association (not the league) to which the club is affiliated. A flag is included for coaches that are of a different nationality than their own national team.

== Group A ==
=== Angola ===
Coach: Lurdes Lutonda

The final squad was announced on 23 October 2020.

No.	Pos.	Player	Date of birth (age)	Club
1	GK	Mimi	2 March 1995 (aged 25)	(Angolan Football Federation) Paulo FC
2	DF	Indira	10 July 2000 (aged 20)	(Angolan Football Federation) 1º de Agosto
3	DF	Lena	19 January 1999 (aged 21)	(Angolan Football Federation) 1º de Agosto
4	MF	Lídia	29 January 1998 (aged 22)	(Angolan Football Federation) Sagrada Esperança
5	DF	Dorcacia		(Angolan Football Federation) Sagrada Esperança
6	MF	Prado	12 September 1999 (aged 21)	(Angolan Football Federation) 1º de Agosto
7	FW	Alegria	14 May 1995 (aged 25)	(Angolan Football Federation) Sagrada Esperança
8	MF	Chiquita	19 September 1997 (aged 23)	(Angolan Football Federation) Kilamba City
9	FW	Laura	3 September 1999 (aged 21)	(Angolan Football Federation) 1º de Agosto
10	MF	Ana Afonso		(Angolan Football Federation) Kilamba City
11	FW	Nsimba Ngoy		(Angolan Football Federation) Sagrada Esperança
12	GK	Rita	20 March 1998 (aged 22)	(Angolan Football Federation) Tchapesseca
13	DF	Fátima Faria		(Angolan Football Federation) Kilamba City
14	FW	Bia	29 April 1997 (aged 23)	(Angolan Football Federation) Kilamba City
15	DF	Lucinda Domingos		(Angolan Football Federation) 1º de Agosto
16	FW	Fernanda Teixeira		(Angolan Football Federation) Paulo FC
17	FW	Marizete	24 April 1999 (aged 21)	(Angolan Football Federation) Paulo FC
18	DF	Henriqueta Serrote		(Angolan Football Federation) 1º de Agosto
19	FW	Argentina Jorge		(Angolan Football Federation) Kilamba City
20	GK	Sandrinha	5 October 1997 (aged 23)	(Angolan Football Federation) Sagrada Esperança

=== Comoros ===
Coach: Choudjay Mahandhi

The final squad was announced on 30 October 2020.

No.	Pos.	Player	Date of birth (age)	Club
1	GK	Rasoafara Solarisse	14 February 1985 (aged 35)	(Comoros Football Federation) Olympique de Moroni
2	DF	Nadia Farid		(Comoros Football Federation) FC Inanga
3	DF	Zalia Mahamdou	1 December 2002 (aged 17)	(Ligue réunionnaise de football) Saint-Denis
5	MF	Wafat Mari	26 September 1994 (aged 26)	(French Football Federation) Paris Elite
6	FW	Roukia Mohamed		(Comoros Football Federation) Belle Lumière
7	FW	Inès Mohamed	14 February 2002 (aged 18)	(French Football Federation) FC Lyon
8	DF	Halima Attoumane	1 December 1995 (aged 24)	(Comoros Football Federation) Ouvanga Espoir
9	FW	Anlaouia Hadhirami		(Comoros Football Federation) Olympique de Moroni
10	MF	Hairyat Abdourahmane	7 April 1994 (aged 26)	(Comoros Football Federation) Olympique de Moroni
11	MF	Bibi Raïssa Housseni	28 January 2002 (aged 18)	(Ligue réunionnaise de football) Saint-Denis
12	DF	Nayma Mouhitou	23 December 1996 (aged 23)	(Ligue réunionnaise de football) Saint-Denis
13	FW	Zaharouna Haoudadji		(French Football Federation) US Vendôme
15	FW	Nakicha Mohamed		(Comoros Football Federation)
16	GK	Mohamed Rafik Faharia		(Comoros Football Federation) Panasco de Malé
18	DF	Asmahani Ahmed	21 November 1988 (aged 31)	(Comoros Football Federation) FC Ouani
19	MF	Anissa Maoulida	26 May 1997 (aged 23)	(French Football Federation) Blois
21	FW	Djamila Dhurari		(French Football Federation) FC Touraine
22	MF	Charline Ould Bamba	10 March 1996 (aged 24)	(Comoros Football Federation) Ouvanga Espoir
	DF	Aliya Saïd	14 February 1998 (aged 22)	(French Football Federation) Thonon Évian
	DF	Dioré Saïd	25 May 2003 (aged 17)	(French Football Federation) Issy-les-Moulineaux

=== Eswatini ===
Coach: Christian Thwala

The final squad was announced on 31 October 2020.

No.	Pos.	Player	Date of birth (age)	Club
1	GK	Nokwanda Mamba		(Eswatini Football Association) Young Buffaloes
2	MF	Tenanile Ngcamphalala	15 February 1998 (aged 22)	(Eswatini Football Association) Young Buffaloes
4	FW	Nomvula Sanga	15 September 1988 (aged 32)	(Eswatini Football Association) Manzini Wanderers
5	DF	Thulisile Dvuba	12 November 1988 (aged 31)	(Eswatini Football Association) Young Buffaloes
6	MF	Tenanile Dube		(Eswatini Football Association) Manzini Wanderers
7	FW	Celiwe Nkambule	19 February 1993 (aged 27)	(Eswatini Football Association) Young Buffaloes
8	DF	Ncedile Dlamini		(Eswatini Football Association) Young Buffaloes
9	FW	Sibonelo Gwebu		(Eswatini Football Association) Mbabane Swallows
10	MF	Simangele Sikhondze		(Eswatini Football Association) Elangeni
11	MF	Phumzile Dlamini		(Eswatini Football Association) Royal Leopards
12	DF	Thandeka Mbatha		(Eswatini Football Association) Manzini Wanderers
13	MF	Nokuthula Dlamini		(Eswatini Football Association) Young Buffaloes
14	DF	Ncedo Gamedze		(Football Federation of Burundi) Inter Star
15	DF	Welile Ndwandwe		(Eswatini Football Association) Manzini Wanderers
16	GK	Gcinile Dlamini		(Football Federation of Burundi) Inter Star
17	FW	Nonjabulo Mokgale		(Eswatini Football Association) Royal Leopards
18	MF	Gcinile Zwane		(Eswatini Football Association) Manzini Wanderers
19	MF	Sikhanyiso Magagula		(Eswatini Football Association) Young Buffaloes
	DF	Futhi Dlamini		(Eswatini Football Association) Royal Leopards
	DF	Lungile Dlamini	25 December 1985 (aged 34)	(Eswatini Football Association) Young Buffaloes

=== South Africa ===
Coach: Desiree Ellis

A provisional 27-woman squad was announced on 15 October 2020. The final squad was announced on 28 October 2020.

No.	Pos.	Player	Date of birth (age)	Club
1	GK	Kaylin Swart	30 September 1994 (aged 26)	Unattached
2	DF	Karabo Makhurubetshi	3 February 1999 (aged 21)	(South African Football Association) Mamelodi Sundowns
3	MF	Oratile Mokwena	21 March 2001 (aged 19)	(South African Football Association) Mamelodi Sundowns
4	DF	Koketso Tlailane	7 December 1992 (aged 27)	(South African Football Association) TUT
5	DF	Bongeka Gamede	22 May 1999 (aged 21)	(South African Football Association) UWC
6	MF	Mamello Makhabane	24 February 1988 (aged 32)	(South African Football Association) JVW
7	MF	Gabriela Salgado	20 February 1998 (aged 22)	(South African Football Association) JVW
8	DF	Sibulele Holweni	28 April 2001 (aged 19)	(South African Football Association) UWC
9	FW	Hildah Magaia	16 December 1994 (aged 25)	(South African Football Association) TUT
10	MF	Robyn Moodaly	16 June 1994 (aged 26)	(South African Football Association) JVW
11	MF	Nomvula Kgoale	20 November 1995 (aged 24)	(South African Football Association) TUT
12	MF	Nonhlanhla Mthandi		(South African Football Association) Mamelodi Sundowns
13	DF	Xiluva Tshabalala		(South African Football Association) Ma-Indies
14	FW	Neliswa Luthuli	10 September 1996 (aged 24)	(South African Football Association) Sunflower
15	MF	Karabo Dhlamini	18 September 2001 (aged 19)	(South African Football Association) Mamelodi Sundowns
16	GK	Andile Dlamini	2 September 1992 (aged 28)	(South African Football Association) Mamelodi Sundowns
17	MF	Lonathemba Mhlongo	23 August 2002 (aged 18)	(South African Football Association) Durban
18	DF	Ongeziwe Ndlangisa	6 April 1994 (aged 26)	(South African Football Association) Sunflower
19	DF	Kaylyn Jordaan	5 April 2001 (aged 19)	(South African Football Association) Spurs
20	FW	Pride Nthite		(South African Football Association) TUT

== Group B ==
=== Lesotho ===
Coach: Lehloenya Nkhasi

The final squad was announced on 28 October 2020. On 30 October 2020, Litšeoane Maloro was ruled out due to an ankle injury and was replaced by Maseeiso Mphubelu.

No.	Pos.	Player	Date of birth (age)	Club
1	GK	Boitumelo Nkeane	26 December 2000 (aged 19)	(South African Football Association) Grassland
2	DF	Mosili Motšoeneng	15 August 1996 (aged 24)	(South African Football Association) Bloemfontein Celtic
3	DF	Tšoanelo Leboka	1 January 1996 (aged 24)	(Lesotho Football Association) Lesotho Defence Force
4	DF	Montšeng Matete	9 July 1993 (aged 27)	(Eswatini Football Association) Simunye
5	DF	Ntsatsi Khakanyo	26 July 1992 (aged 28)	(Lesotho Football Association) Lesotho Defence Force
6	MF	Mosele Pita	26 May 1998 (aged 22)	(Lesotho Football Association) Lesotho Defence Force
7	MF	Maseriti Mohlolo	22 April 1997 (aged 23)	(Lesotho Football Association) Lesotho Defence Force
8	FW	Senate Letsie	30 May 1994 (aged 26)	(Canadian Soccer Association) CBU Capers
9	FW	Mamasoabi Monese	5 March 1999 (aged 21)	(Lesotho Football Association) Lesotho Defence Force
10	MF	Boitumelo Rabale (captain)	5 August 1996 (aged 24)	(Canadian Soccer Association) CBU Capers
11	MF	Palesa Mpeta	23 May 1994 (aged 26)	(Lesotho Football Association) Lesotho Defence Force
12	FW	Kholu Lebakeng	13 October 1986 (aged 34)	(Lesotho Football Association) Lesotho Defence Force
13	DF	Lerato Kheme	11 May 1994 (aged 26)	(Lesotho Football Association) Lesotho Defence Force
14	MF	Ntsabeng Pelea	19 May 1997 (aged 23)	(Lesotho Football Association) Lesotho Defence Force
15	FW	Phuzile Molefe	18 January 1997 (aged 23)	(Lesotho Football Association) Lesotho Defence Force
16	GK	Thuto Maifo	25 May 1995 (aged 25)	(South African Football Association) Metheo
17	FW	Nthabeleng Potsane	20 October 1998 (aged 22)	(Lesotho Football Association) Lesotho Defence Force
18	FW	Maseeiso Mphubelu	20 January 1987 (aged 33)	(Lesotho Football Association) Basetsana United
19	DF	Mamoruti Ntsiki	10 August 1989 (aged 31)	(Lesotho Football Association) Lesotho Defence Force

=== Malawi ===
Coach: McNelbert Kazuwa

A provisional squad was announced on 24 October 2020. The final squad was announced on 3 November 2020.

No.	Pos.	Player	Date of birth (age)	Club
1	GK	Mercy Sikelo	22 December 1997 (aged 22)	(Football Association of Malawi) Ntopwa Super Queens
2	DF	Emily Jossam	18 August 1998 (aged 22)	(Football Association of Malawi) Skippers
3	DF	Ruth Nyirongo	30 December 1995 (aged 24)	(Football Association of Malawi) DD Sunshine
4	DF	Chimwemwe Madise	6 April 1992 (aged 28)	(Football Association of Malawi) DD Sunshine
5	DF	Patricia Nyirenda	8 April 1998 (aged 22)	(Football Association of Malawi) Ntopwa Super Queens
6	DF	Salome Vinkhumbu	9 February 1986 (aged 34)	(Football Association of Malawi) Blantyre Zero
7	FW	Asimenye Simwaka	8 August 1997 (aged 23)	(Football Association of Malawi) Topik Sisters
8	MF	Chikondi Gondwe	19 September 1998 (aged 22)	(Football Association of Malawi) CY Sisters
9	FW	Sabinah Thom	3 March 1996 (aged 24)	(Football Association of Malawi) DD Sunshine
10	FW	Temwa Chawinga	20 September 1998 (aged 22)	(Chinese Football Association) Wuhan Jianghan
11	FW	Tabitha Chawinga	22 May 1996 (aged 24)	(Chinese Football Association) Jiangsu Suning
12	DF	Wezzie Mvula	6 July 1996 (aged 24)	(Football Association of Malawi) DD Sunshine
13	FW	Vanessa Chikupila	2 April 1991 (aged 29)	(Football Association of Malawi) Blantyre Zero
14	MF	Madyina Ngulube	18 June 1996 (aged 24)	(Football Association of Malawi) DD Sunshine
15	DF	Maureen Phiri	19 April 1998 (aged 22)	(Football Association of Malawi) CY Sisters
16	GK	Samir Amidu	29 December 1996 (aged 23)	(Football Association of Malawi) DD Sunshine
17	MF	Zainab Kapanda	12 March 2002 (aged 18)	(Football Association of Malawi) Blantyre Zero
18	MF	Saliva January	21 November 1998 (aged 21)	(Football Association of Malawi) Ntopwa Super Queens
19	FW	Mary Chavinda	27 December 1998 (aged 21)	(Football Association of Malawi) Blantyre Zero
20	DF	Tiwonge Phiri	28 August 2000 (aged 20)	(Football Association of Malawi) DD Sunshine

=== Zambia ===
Coach: Bruce Mwape

A 28-woman provisional squad was announced on 25 September 2020. The final squad was announced on 1 November 2020.

No.	Pos.	Player	Date of birth (age)	Club
1	GK	Catherine Musonda	20 February 1998 (aged 22)	(Football Association of Zambia) Indeni Roses
2	DF	Mary Mulenga	11 April 1998 (aged 22)	(Football Association of Zambia) Red Arrows
3	DF	Lushomo Mweemba	10 April 2001 (aged 19)	(Football Association of Zambia) Green Buffaloes
4	FW	Maylan Mulenga	17 May 2000 (aged 20)	(Football Association of Zambia) Green Buffaloes
5	DF	Anita Mulenga	3 May 1995 (aged 25)	(Football Association of Zambia) Green Buffaloes
6	MF	Mary Wilombe	22 September 1997 (aged 23)	(Football Association of Zambia) Red Arrows
7	MF	Misozi Zulu	11 October 1994 (aged 26)	(Football Association of Zambia) Indeni Roses
8	DF	Margaret Belemu	24 February 1997 (aged 23)	(Football Association of Zambia) Red Arrows
9	FW	Ochumba Oseke	1 July 2002 (aged 18)	(Football Association of Zambia) Red Arrows
10	FW	Grace Chanda	11 June 1997 (aged 23)	(Football Association of Zambia) ZESCO United
11	FW	Barbra Banda	20 March 2000 (aged 20)	(Chinese Football Association) Shanghai Shengli
12	DF	Vast Phiri	3 February 1996 (aged 24)	(Football Association of Zambia) ZESCO United
13	DF	Martha Tembo	8 March 1998 (aged 22)	(Football Association of Zambia) Green Buffaloes
14	MF	Ireen Lungu	6 October 1997 (aged 23)	(Football Association of Zambia) Green Buffaloes
15	DF	Agness Musase	11 July 1997 (aged 23)	(Football Association of Zambia) Green Buffaloes
16	GK	Hazel Nali	4 April 1998 (aged 22)	(Football Association of Zambia) Green Buffaloes
17	MF	Theresa Chewe	27 November 1997 (aged 22)	(Football Association of Zambia) Indeni Roses
18	GK	Ngambo Musole	23 June 1998 (aged 22)	(Football Association of Zambia) ZESCO United
19	DF	Fikile Nkhosa		(Football Association of Zambia) Red Arrows
20	FW	Prisca Chilufya	8 June 1999 (aged 21)	(Football Association of Zambia) Red Arrows

== Group C ==
=== Botswana ===
Coach: Gaoletlhoo Nkutlusang

A provisional squad was announced on 16 October 2020. The final squad was selected prior to the tournament.

No.	Pos.	Player	Date of birth (age)	Club
1	GK	Tlamelo Pheresi	30 November 1996 (aged 23)	(Botswana Football Association) Prisons
2	DF	Kesegofetse Mochawe	30 January 1995 (aged 25)	(Botswana Football Association) Prisons
3	DF	Annah Sechane	7 February 2001 (aged 19)	(Botswana Football Association) Township Rollers
4	DF	Masego Montsho	15 June 1991 (aged 29)	(Botswana Football Association) Botswana Defence Force
5	MF	Gaonyadiwe Ontlametse	12 January 2000 (aged 20)	(Botswana Football Association) Double Action
6	MF	Golebaone Selebatso	22 March 1991 (aged 29)	(Botswana Football Association) Prisons
7	FW	Refilwe Tholekele	26 January 1996 (aged 24)	(Botswana Football Association) Township Rollers
8	MF	Masego Nfandiso		(Botswana Football Association) Geronah
9	FW	Mokgabo Thanda		(Football Association of Zambia) Yasa
10	MF	Lesego Radiakanyo	23 July 1999 (aged 21)	(Botswana Football Association) Double Action
11	DF	Lone Gaofetoge	16 July 2001 (aged 19)	(Botswana Football Association) Geronah
12	DF	Bonang Otlhagile (captain)	7 August 1986 (aged 34)	(Botswana Football Association) Double Action
13	MF	Leungo Senwelo	23 December 2001 (aged 18)	(Botswana Football Association) Double Action
14	FW	Michelle Abueng	6 May 2001 (aged 19)	(Football Association of Zambia) Yasa
15	DF	Theo George	30 January 2001 (aged 19)	(Botswana Football Association) Wonder Sporting
16	GK	Lesedilame Bosija	1 December 1997 (aged 22)	(South African Football Association) Bloemfontein Celtic
17	MF	Leano Busang	20 December 1999 (aged 20)	(Botswana Football Association) Prisons
18	FW	Nondi Mahlasela	25 December 1991 (aged 28)	(Botswana Football Association) Prisons
19	FW	Esalenna Galekhutle	23 January 2001 (aged 19)	(Botswana Football Association) Mexican Girls
20	GK	Lesego Moeng		(Botswana Football Association) Geronah

=== Tanzania ===
Coach: Bakari Shime

A provisional squad was announced on 16 October 2020.

No.	Pos.	Player	Date of birth (age)	Club
1	GK	Neema Majimoto		(Tanzania Football Federation) Evergreen Queens
2	DF	Anastas Katunzi	29 January 1996 (aged 24)	(Tanzania Football Federation) JKT Queens
3	DF	Eva Jackson	2 May 2000 (aged 20)	(Tanzania Football Federation) Ruvuma Queens
4	MF	Amina Bilali (captain)	28 December 1994 (aged 25)	(Tanzania Football Federation) Yanga Princess
5	MF	Lucia Mrema		(Tanzania Football Federation) Yanga Princess
6	DF	Fumukazi Nguruwe		(Tanzania Football Federation) Ruvuma Queens
7	FW	Mwanahamis Omary	16 October 1989 (aged 31)	(Tanzania Football Federation) Simba Queens
8	DF	Stumai Athumani	25 August 1997 (aged 23)	(Tanzania Football Federation) JKT Queens
9		Gladness Kyando		(Tanzania Football Federation) Tanzanite Queens
10	FW	Pheromena Kizima	11 July 2000 (aged 20)	(Tanzania Football Federation) Mlandizi Queens
11	DF	Violeth Thadeo	1 August 2001 (aged 19)	(Tanzania Football Federation) Simba Queens
12	DF	Violeth Nicholaus	9 February 1995 (aged 25)	(Tanzania Football Federation) Simba Queens
13	MF	Kadosho Shekigenda		(Tanzania Football Federation) Simba Queens
14	DF	Julietha Aminael	8 February 2001 (aged 19)	(Tanzania Football Federation) Simba Queens
15	MF	Janeth Pangamwene	27 November 2000 (aged 19)	(Tanzania Football Federation) Mlandizi Queens
16	FW	Opa Clement	14 February 2001 (aged 19)	(Tanzania Football Federation) Simba Queens
17	MF	Enekia Lunyamila	20 April 2002 (aged 18)	(Tanzania Football Federation) Alliance Girls
18	GK	Najiat Idrisa	2 April 1997 (aged 23)	(Tanzania Football Federation) JKT Queens
19	DF	Happiness Mwaipaja	7 May 1996 (aged 24)	(Tanzania Football Federation) Yanga Princess
20	GK	Zubeda Mohamed	20 October 1997 (aged 23)	(Tanzania Football Federation) Simba Queens

=== Zimbabwe ===
Coach: Sithethelelwe Sibanda

The final squad was announced on 2 November 2020.

No.	Pos.	Player	Date of birth (age)	Club
2	DF	Talent Mukwanda	24 April 1993 (aged 27)	(Zimbabwe Football Association) Herentals
3	DF	Sharon Teterai	10 April 2000 (aged 20)	(Zimbabwe Football Association) Black Rhinos
4	DF	Egness Tumbare	31 July 1993 (aged 27)	(Zimbabwe Football Association) Harare City
5	MF	Emmaculate Msipa	7 June 1992 (aged 28)	(Zimbabwe Football Association) Black Rhinos
6	DF	Precious Baison	8 March 2000 (aged 20)	(Zimbabwe Football Association) Auckaland
8	DF	Shiela Makoto	14 January 1990 (aged 30)	(Zimbabwe Football Association) Blue Swallows
9	DF	Nobukhosi Ncube	17 February 1993 (aged 27)	(Zimbabwe Football Association) Correctional Services
10	MF	Mavis Chirandu	15 January 1995 (aged 25)	(Zimbabwe Football Association) Black Rhinos
11	FW	Dinah Banda	27 January 2001 (aged 19)	(Zimbabwe Football Association) Queen Lozikeyi Academy
12	MF	Shamiso Mutasa	9 June 1994 (aged 26)	(Zimbabwe Football Association) Herentals
13	DF	Moreblessing Bwende	1 August 2001 (aged 19)	(Zimbabwe Football Association) Harare City
14	MF	Faith Chezhara	21 May 2001 (aged 19)	(Zimbabwe Football Association) Harare City
15	FW	Rutendo Makore	30 September 1992 (aged 28)	(Zimbabwe Football Association) Black Rhinos
16	GK	Lindiwe Magwede	1 December 1991 (aged 28)	(Zimbabwe Football Association) Herentals
17	MF	Shyline Dambamuromo	4 April 2000 (aged 20)	(Zimbabwe Football Association) Faith Drive
18	FW	Talent Bizeki	9 December 2000 (aged 19)	(Zimbabwe Football Association) Maningi
19	GK	Cynthia Shonga	18 June 2000 (aged 20)	(Zimbabwe Football Association) Harare City
20	MF	Danai Bhobho	1 December 1992 (aged 27)	(Zimbabwe Football Association) Harare City

== Player representation ==
Statistics are per the beginning of the competition.

=== By club ===
Clubs with 5 or more players represented are listed.

Players	Club
11	Lesotho Defence Force
8	(Eswatini) Young Buffaloes
7	(Malawi) DD Sunshine, (Tanzania) Simba, (Zambia) Green Buffaloes
6	(Angola) 1º de Agosto, (Zambia) Red Arrows, (Zimbabwe) Harare City
5	(Angola) Esperança, (Angola) Kilamba City, (Botswana) Prisons, (Eswatini) Manzini Wanderers, (South Africa) Mamelodi Sundowns

=== By club nationality ===
Players	Clubs
24	South Africa
21	Zambia
20	Angola, Tanzania
19	Eswatini
18	Malawi, Zimbabwe
17	Botswana
12	Lesotho
10	Comoros
7	France
3	China, Réunion
2	Burundi, Canada

=== By club federation ===
Players	Federation
184	CAF
7	UEFA
3	AFC
2	CONCACAF

=== By representatives of domestic league ===
National squad	Players
Angola	20
Tanzania	20
South Africa	19
Zambia	19
Eswatini	18
Malawi	18
Zimbabwe	18
Botswana	17
Lesotho	12
Comoros	10
