= Malawi women's national football team results =

This article lists the results and fixtures for the Malawi women's national football team.

Nicknamed the "Scorchers" the team represents Malawi in women's association football. its governed by the Football Association of Malawi (FAM) and it competes as a member of the Confederation of African Football (CAF). The national team's first international activity was in 2002 when they participated in the inaugural 2002 COSAFA Women's Championship in Zimbabwe. the Malawian first game was a 0–8 loss to Zambia. the team currently (as of 25 August 2023) ranks 158th in the FIFA Women's World Ranking.

The team's largest win was against Seychelles team with a score of 17–0. This win occurred in two matches on September 25 and 28, 2023, both hosted in Blantyre.

== Record per opponent ==
Key

Positive balance (more wins than losses)
Neutral balance (as many wins as losses)
Negative balance (more losses than wins)

The following table shows Malawi' all-time official international record per opponent:

| Opponent | Pld | W | D | L | GF | GA | GD | W% | Confederation |
|---|---|---|---|---|---|---|---|---|---|
| Angola | 1 | 1 | 0 | 0 | 2 | 0 | +2 | 100.00 | CAF |
| Benin | 2 | 0 | 1 | 1 | 0 | 1 | −1 | 00.00 | CAF |
| Botswana | 2 | 0 | 1 | 1 | 1 | 3 | −2 | 00.00 | CAF |
| Comoros | 2 | 2 | 0 | 0 | 19 | 0 | +19 | 100.00 | CAF |
| Eswatini | 1 | 1 | 0 | 0 | 8 | 0 | +8 | 100.00 | CAF |
| Ethiopia | 2 | 0 | 0 | 2 | 0 | 9 | −9 | 00.00 | CAF |
| Kenya | 2 | 1 | 0 | 1 | 3 | 5 | −2 | 50.00 | CAF |
| Lesotho | 4 | 4 | 0 | 0 | 20 | 2 | +18 | 100.00 | CAF |
| Madagascar | 4 | 4 | 0 | 0 | 13 | 4 | +9 | 100.00 | CAF |
| Mozambique | 5 | 4 | 1 | 0 | 20 | 5 | +15 | 80.00 | CAF |
| South Africa | 8 | 2 | 0 | 6 | 12 | 30 | −18 | 25.00 | CAF |
| Seychelles | 2 | 2 | 0 | 0 | 34 | 0 | +34 | 100.00 | CAF |
| Tanzania | 4 | 0 | 0 | 4 | 1 | 9 | −8 | 00.00 | CAF |
| Zambia | 9 | 3 | 1 | 5 | 15 | 31 | −16 | 33.33 | CAF |
| Zimbabwe | 3 | 0 | 1 | 2 | 5 | 17 | −12 | 00.00 | CAF |
| Total | 51 | 24 | 5 | 22 | 153 | 116 | +37 | 47.06 | — |

== Results ==
=== 2002 ===
| 20 April 2002 2002 COSAFA WC GS | Zambia | 8–0 | Malawi | Harare, Zimbabwe |
| --:-- UTC+2 |

| 21 April 2002 2002 COSAFA WC GS | Lesotho | 0–3 | Malawi | Harare, Zimbabwe |
| --:-- UTC+2 |

| 24 April 2002 2002 COSAFA WC GS | Malawi | 0–6 | Zimbabwe | Harare, Zimbabwe |
| --:-- UTC+2 |

=== 2004 ===
| 11 July 2004 2004 African Championship Q R1 1st leg | Malawi | 0–4 | Ethiopia | Blantyre, Malawi |
| --:-- UTC+1 | | Report | Addis 6', 87'; Gebrekirstos 27'; Kemal 83' | Referee: Risina Kuda Majo (Zimbabwe) |

| 25 July 2004 2004 African Championship Q R1 2nd leg | Ethiopia | 5–0 (9–0 agg.) | Malawi | Addis Ababa, Ethiopia |
| --:-- UTC+2 | Gebrekirstos 24', 32', 53'; Seifu 57'; Addis 66' | Report | | Referee: Kubingi Margre (Uganda) |
Note: Ethiopia won 9–0 on aggregate.

=== 2006 ===
| 19 February 2006 2006 African Championship Q PR 1st leg | Benin | 1–0 | Malawi | Cotonou, Benin |
| --:-- UTC+1 |

| 26 February 2006 2006 African Championship Q PR 2nd leg | Malawi | 0–0 (0–1 agg.) | Benin | Blantyre, Malawi |
| --:-- UTC+2 |
Note: Benin won 1–0 on aggregate.

| 23 August 2006 2006 COSAFA WC GS | Malawi | 3–0 | Lesotho | Lusaka, Zambia |
| --:-- UTC+2 | Chimaliro 28'; Kasiya 47'; Kazisonga 60' | | | Stadium: Woodlands Stadium |

| 24 August 2006 2006 COSAFA WC GS | Malawi | 0–3 | South Africa | Lusaka, Zambia |
| --:-- UTC+2 | | | Phewa 10'; Modise 27'; Carelse (??) | Stadium: Woodlands Stadium |

=== 2011 ===
| 2 July 2011 2011 COSAFA WC GS | Malawi | 1–1 | Mozambique | Harare, Zimbabwe |
| 13:00 UTC+2 | Ta. Chawinga (??) | | | Stadium: Gwanzura Stadium |

| 4 July 2011 2011 COSAFA WC GS | Malawi | 2–8 | Zimbabwe | Harare, Zimbabwe |
| --:-- UTC+2 | Kasenda (??) | Report | Machingura (??); Ndlovu (??); Mandaza (??) |

| 5 July 2011 2011 COSAFA WC GS | Lesotho | 2–5 | Malawi | Harare, Zimbabwe |
| --:-- UTC+2 | Kepa (??); Rabale (??) | Report | Ta. Chawinga (??); [[]] (??); Sinjani (??); Chombo (??) | Stadium: Rufaro Stadium |

| 6 July 2011 2011 COSAFA WC SF | South Africa | 5–1 | Malawi | Harare, Zimbabwe |
| 12:30 UTC+2 | Vilakazi 21'; Dlamini 24', 62'; Jafta 85'; Matlou 89' (pen.) | Report | Ta. Chawinga 17'; Msiska (red card) 44' | Stadium: Rufaro Stadium; Referee: Bolokonang Lengowe (Botswana) |

| 8 July 2011 2011 COSAFA WC 3rd P | Tanzania | 3–0 | Malawi | Harare, Zimbabwe |
| 12:30 UTC+2 | | | | Stadium: Rufaro Stadium |

=== 2012 ===
| 14 January 2012 2012 African Championship Q PR 1st leg | Zambia | 7–0 | Malawi | Lusaka, Zambia |
| 13:00 UTC+2 | Sosala 2', 28'; Mupopo 4'; Bowa 35', 79'; Kibanji 50'; M.Zulu 57' | Report | | Stadium: Nkoloma Stadium |

| 29 January 2012 2012 African Championship Q PR 2nd leg | Malawi | 4–2 (4–9 agg.) | Zambia | Blantyre, Malawi |
| --:-- UTC+2 | Ta. Chawinga (??); [[]]; [[]]; [[]] | | S. Banda (??); Kawange (??) | Stadium: Kamuzu Stadium |
Note: Zambia won 9–4 on aggregate.

=== 2015 ===
| 7 November 2015 International Friendly | Tanzania | 2–0 | Malawi | Dar es Salaam, Tanzania |
| 15:00 UTC+3 | | Report | | Stadium: National Stadium |

=== 2016 ===
| 30 December 2016 International Friendly | Malawi | 2–3 | Zambia | Lilongwe, Malawi |
| 14:30 UTC+2 | Te. Chawinga 30'; Ta. Chawinga 60' | Report | Sosola 27'; B. Banda 40', 81' | Stadium: Nankhaka Stadium |

=== 2017 ===
| 13 September 2017 2017 COSAFA WC GS | Zambia | 6–3 | Malawi | Bulawayo, Zimbabwe |
| 14:00 UTC+2 | Sosala 12'; M. Zulu 17', 54', 76'; Banda 23'; Nachula 90' | Report | Ta. Chawinga 9', 35', 86' | Stadium: Barbourfields Stadium |

| 15 September 2017 2017 COSAFA WC GS | Madagascar | 3–6 | Malawi | Bulawayo, Zimbabwe |
| 10:30 UTC+2 | Farafanirina 54', 69'; Razafindrabe 65' | Report | Ta. Chawinga 22', 37', 87', 90'; Te. Chawinga 45', 49' | Stadium: Barbourfields Stadium |

| 17 September 2017 2017 COSAFA WC GS | Zimbabwe | 3–3 | Malawi | Bulawayo, Zimbabwe |
| 14:00 UTC+2 | Makore 22', 31', 57' | Report | Te. Chawinga 37'; Ta. Chawinga 60', 89' | Stadium: Luveve Stadium |

=== 2018 ===
| 12 September 2018 2018 COSAFA WC GS | Botswana | 2–0 | Malawi | Port Elizabeth, South Africa |
| 10:00 UTC+2 | Keleboge 6'; Radikakanyo 78' | Report | | Stadium: Wolfson Stadium |

| 14 September 2018 2018 COSAFA WC GS | Madagascar | 0–2 | Malawi | Port Elizabeth, South Africa |
| 10:00 UTC+2 | | Report | Kasenda 18'; Kapanda 81' | Stadium: Wolfson Stadium |

| 17 September 2018 2018 COSAFA WC GS | South Africa | 6–0 | Malawi | Port Elizabeth, South Africa |
| 15:30 UTC+2 | Motlhalo 10', 88', 89'; Xesi 31', 45'; Mohlakoana 53' | Report | | Stadium: Wolfson Stadium |

=== 2019 ===
| 4 April 2019 2020 CAF Olympic QT R1 1st leg | Malawi | 11–1 | Mozambique | Blantyre, Malawi |
| 14:30 UTC+2 | Ta. Chawinga 13', 30', 90+1'; Te. Chawinga 20', 34', 36', 43', 56'; Mvula 39'; Kasenda 52', 53' | Report | Isabel 90+3' | Stadium: Kamuzu Stadium |

| 9 April 2019 2020 CAF Olympic QT R1 2nd leg | Mozambique | 0–3 (1–14 agg.) | Malawi | Maputo, Mozambique |
| 15:00 UTC+2 | | Report | Te. Chawinga 51'; Ta. Chawinga 72'; Thom 82' | Stadium: Estádio do Zimpeto |
Note: Malawi won 14–1 on aggregate.

| 31 July 2019 2019 COSAFA WC GS | Malawi | 2–0 | Madagascar | Port Elizabeth, South Africa |
| 12:45 UTC+2 | Vinkhumbu 81'; Kapanda 88' | Report | | Stadium: Wolfson Stadium |

| 2 August 2019 2019 COSAFA WC GS | South Africa | 3–1 | Malawi | Port Elizabeth, South Africa |
| 15:30 UTC+2 | Ramalepe 36'; Cesane 68'; Mthandi 85' | Report | Simwaka 4' | Stadium: Wolfson Stadium |

| 5 August 2019 2019 COSAFA WC GS | Malawi | 13–0 | Comoros | Port Elizabeth, South Africa |
| 12:45 UTC+2 | Simwaka 17', 17'; Kasenda 31', 43', 44', 48', 62', 67', 88', 90'; Thom 41', 47'; Kapanda 66' | Report | | Stadium: Gelvandale Stadium |

| 28 August 2019 2020 CAF Olympic QT R2 1st leg | Malawi | 3–2 | Kenya | Blantyre, Malawi |
| 14:30 UTC+2 | Nguluwe 13'; Ta. Chawinga 36', 40' (pen.) | Report | Shilwatso 24'; Wambui 81' | Stadium: Kamuzu Stadium; Referee: Thanks Nyahuye (Zimbabwe) |

| 1 September 2019 2020 CAF Olympic QT R1 2nd leg | Kenya | 3–0 (5–3 agg.) | Malawi | Machakos, Kenya |
| 13:00 UTC+3 | Shilwatso 19'; Adam 77', 88' | Report | | Stadium: Kenyatta Stadium |
Note: Kenya won 5–3 on aggregate.

=== 2020 ===
| 7 November 2020 2020 COSAFA WC GS | Malawi | 9–0 | Lesotho | Port Elizabeth, South Africa |
| 15:30 UTC+2 | Kapanda 3'; Ta. Chawinga 5', 23', 45' (pen.), 45', 58', 75'; Te. Chawinga 12'; Simwaka 57' | Report | | Stadium: Wolfson Stadium |

| 9 November 2020 2020 COSAFA WC GS | Zambia | 0–1 | Malawi | Port Elizabeth, South Africa |
| 12:30 UTC+2 | | Report | Te. Chawinga 31' | Stadium: Wolfson Stadium |

| 12 November 2020 2020 COSAFA WC SF | South Africa | 6–2 | Malawi | Port Elizabeth, South Africa |
| 15:30 UTC+2 | Kgoale 51', 64'; Magaia 62', 68', 75'; Holweni 74' | Report | Te. Chawinga 53'; Ta. Chawinga 78' | Stadium: Wolfson Stadium |

=== 2021 ===
| 28 September 2021 2021 COSAFA WC GS | South Africa | 2–1 | Malawi | Port Elizabeth, South Africa |
| 15:30 UTC+2 | Kgadiete 3'; Cesane 37' | Report | Mvula 90' | Stadium: Wolfson Stadium |

| 1 October 2021 2021 COSAFA WC GS | Malawi | 3–2 | Mozambique | Port Elizabeth, South Africa |
| 15:30 UTC+2 | Kapanda 21'; Thom 32'; Khumalo 57' | Report | Cina 12'; Ninika 13' | Stadium: Gelvandale Stadium |

| 4 October 2021 2021 COSAFA WC GS | Angola | 0–2 | Malawi | Port Elizabeth, South Africa |
| 15:30 UTC+2 | | Report | Chikupila 69'; Ngulube 81' | Stadium: Gelvandale Stadium |

| 7 October 2021 2021 COSAFA WC SF | South Africa | 2–3 | Malawi | Port Elizabeth, South Africa |
| 15:30 UTC+2 | Holweni 45', 81' (pen.) | Report | Chiyembekezo 38'; Thom 74', 86' | Stadium: Wolfson Stadium |

| 9 October 2021 2021 COSAFA WC F | Tanzania | 1–0 | Malawi | Port Elizabeth, South Africa |
| 15:00 UTC+2 | Kasonga 64' | Report | | Stadium: Wolfson Stadium; Referee: Antsino Twanyanyukwa (Namibia) |

| 20 October 2021 2022 Africa Cup of Nations Q R1 1st leg | Malawi | 1–1 | Zambia | Lilongwe, Malawi |
| 16:00 UTC+2 | Thom 66' | Report | Chanda 21' | Stadium: Bingu National Stadium; Referee: Itumeleng Methikga (Botswana) |

| 26 October 2021 2022 Africa Cup of Nations Q R1 2nd leg | Zambia | 3–2 (4–3 agg.) | Malawi | Lusaka, Zambia |
| 15:00 UTC+2 | Kundananji 25', 41'; Mweemba 74' | Report | Simwaka 9'; Mvula 70' | Stadium: Nkoloma Stadium |
Note: Zambia won 4–3 on aggregate.

=== 2022 ===
| 2 September 2022 2022 COSAFA WC GS | Botswana | 1–1 | Malawi | Port Elizabeth, South Africa |
| 12:00 UTC+2 | Gaonyadiwe 14' | Report | Mvula 7' | Stadium: Madibaz Stadium |

| 5 September 2022 2022 COSAFA WC GS | Malawi | 6–0 | Comoros | Port Elizabeth, South Africa |
| 12:00 UTC+2 | Chiyembekeza 18'; Kabzere 46'; T. Chawinga 63', 76', 82'; Mvula 90+1' | Report | | Stadium: Madibaz Stadium |

| 7 September 2022 2022 COSAFA WC GS | Tanzania | 3–1 | Malawi | Port Elizabeth, South Africa |
| 15:30 UTC+2 | Minja 20'; Msewa 45'; Clement 59' | Report | Simwaka 65' | Stadium: Madibaz Stadium |

=== 2023 ===
| 25 September 2023 Friendly | Malawi | 17–0 | Seychelles | Blantyre, Malawi |
| 15:00 UTC+2 | Khumalo 9'; Kadzere 16'; Thom 18', 26'; Chikupira 31', 36', 43'; Mlimbika 40'; Mathyola 53'; Chinyamula 55', 84'; Gondwe 60', 81', 87'; Te. Chawinga 62', 76', 78' | Report | | Stadium: Mpira Stadium; Referee: Rose Zimba (Malawi) |

| 28 September 2023 Friendly | Malawi | 17–0 | Seychelles | Blantyre, Malawi |
| 15:00 UTC+2 | Simwaka 6', 41'; Chavinda 7', 21', 44', 50', 79'; Kandodo 9'; Madise 19'; Nyirongo 25'; Sani 28'; Mathyola 53'; Mlimbika 58', 61', 72'; Yosefe 79'; Nyenga 90+2' | Report | | Stadium: Mpira Stadium; Referee: Rose Zimba (Malawi) |

| 4 October 2023 2023 COSAFA WC GS | South Africa | 3–4 | Malawi | Pretoria, South Africa |
| 12:00 UTC+2 | T. Shamase 44'; Nkuna 79'; S. Shamase 90+3' | Report | Chinyamula 27'; Te. Chawinga 45+5', 64', 76' | Stadium: Lucas Moripe Stadium; Referee: Antsino Twanyanyukwa (Namibia) |

| 7 October 2023 2023 COSAFA WC GS | Malawi | 8–0 | Eswatini | Johannesburg, South Africa |
| 12:00 UTC+2 | Thom 6', 33'; Mathyola 45'; Kabzere 52'; Te. Chawinga 55', 63', 75', 76' | Report | | Stadium: Dobsonville Stadium; Referee: Grace Gimo (Zimbabwe) |

| 12 October 2023 2023 COSAFA WC GS | Madagascar | 1–3 | Malawi | Johannesburg, South Africa |
| 15:30 UTC+2 | Randrianarivelo 33' (pen.) | Report | Chikupira 23'; Chinyamula 25'; Simwaka 35' | Stadium: UJ Stadium; Referee: Antsino Twanyanyukwa (Namibia) |

| 13 October 2023 2023 COSAFA WC SF | Malawi | 2–1 | Mozambique | Pretoria, South Africa |
| 15:30 UTC+2 | Te. Chawinga 77', 80' | Report | Mkandawawire 38' (o.g.) | Stadium: Lucas Moripe Stadium; Referee: Salima Mukansanga (Rwanda) |

| 15 October 2023 2023 COSAFA F | Zambia | 1–2 | Malawi | Pretoria, South Africa |
| 15:30 UTC+2 | A. Phiri 84' | Report | Simwaka 34'; Thom 90+1' | Stadium: Lucas Moripe Stadium; Referee: Antsino Twanyanyukwa (Namibia) |

=== 2024 ===
| 23 October 2024 2024 COSAFA WC GS | Malawi | 1–1 | Botswana | Ibhayi, South Africa |
| 15:00 UTC+2 | Chizimu 28' | Report | Moloi 40' | Stadium: Isaac Wolfson Stadium; Referee: Nteboheleng Setoko (Lesotho) |

| 26 October 2024 2024 COSAFA WC GS | Malawi | 1–0 | Madagascar | Gqeberha, South Africa |
| 15:00 UTC+2 | Simwaka 7' | Report | | Stadium: Madibaz Stadium; Referee: Seonyatseng Tshephe (Botswana) |

| 28 October 2024 2024 COSAFA WC GS | Mauritius | 0–9 | Malawi | Gqeberha, South Africa |
| 12:00 UTC+2 | | Report | Chinyamula 8', 51', 79'; Thom 23' (pen.), 70' (pen.), 83'; Simwaka 27'; Kachala 86'; Kenneth 90+13' | Stadium: Madibaz Stadium; Referee: Nteboheleng Setoko (Lesotho) |

| 31 October 2024 2024 COSAFA WC SF | Malawi | 0–2 | Zambia | Ibhayi, South Africa |
| 14:00 UTC+2 | | Report | Lubandji 46'; Mukoma 68' | Stadium: Isaac Wolfson Stadium; Referee: Vistoria Nuusiku Shangula (Namibia) |

=== 2025 ===
| 20 February 2025 2026 WAFCON qualifying | Malawi | Cancelled | Congo | Lilongwe, Malawi |
| 15:00 UTC+2 | | Report | | Stadium: Bingu National Stadium |

| 26 February 2025 2026 WAFCON qualifying | Congo | Cancelled | Malawi | Brazzaville, Congo |
| 15:30 UTC+1 | | Report | | Stadium: Stade Alphonse Massemba-Débat |

| 23 February Friendly | Zambia | 2–0 | Malawi | Lusaka, Zambia |
| 11:00 UTC+2 | Chitundu 20'; Kundananji 79' | Report | | Stadium: REIZ Arena |

| 25 February Friendly | Zambia | 2–3 | Malawi | Lusaka, Zambia |
| 11:30 UTC+2 | Kundananji 6'; Nachula 80' | Report | Kadzere 47'; Chinzimu 56'; Thom 61' | Stadium: REIZ Arena |

| 5 April Friendly | South Africa | 3–0 | Malawi | Johannesburg, South Africa |
| 15:00 CAT | Mthandi 13', 53'; Motlhalo 22' (pen.) | Report | | Stadium: UJ Soweto Campus Sports Complex |

| 8 April Friendly | South Africa | 2–1 | Malawi | Pretoria, South Africa |
| 15:00 CAT | Magaia 75'; Motau 87' | Report | Chikupira 58' | Stadium: Lucas Moripe Stadium |

| 19 June Friendly | Morocco | 4–2 | Malawi | Kenitra, Morocco |
| 21:30 CAT | Mkandawire 40' (o.g.); Ouzraoui 42'; Jraïdi 56'; Chapelle 90+2' | Report | Ta. Chawinga 27' (pen.); Kadzere 35' | Stadium: Kenitra Municipal Stadium; Referee: Aida Sy (Senegal) |

| 21 June Friendly | Ghana | 3–1 | Malawi | Ben Slimane, Morocco |
| 18:00 CAT | Boaduwaa 23' (pen.), 32', 81' | Report | Sani 15' | Stadium: Ziaida Complex |

| 29 August Friendly | Malawi | 3–0 | Lesotho | Blantyre |
| 15:00 CAT | Simwaka 7', 34'; Thom 77' | Report | | Stadium: Mpira Stadium |

| 31 August Friendly | Malawi | 3–0 | Lesotho | Blantyre |
| 15:00 CAT | Simwaka 45+4', 71', 75' | Report | | Stadium: Mpira Stadium |

| 23 October 2026 WAFCON qualifying | Angola | 0–0 | Malawi | Luanda, Angola |
| 17:00 CAT | | Report | | Stadium: Estádio 11 de Novembro; Referee: Aline Umutoni (Rwanda) |

| 28 October 2026 WAFCON qualifying | Malawi | 2–0 | Angola | Lilongwe |
| 15:00 CAT | Chinzimu 82', 84' | Report | | Stadium: Bingu National Stadium; Referee: Rachel Zihindula (DR Congo) |
Note: Malawi won 2–0 on aggregate.

| 28 November 3 Nations Tournament | Zimbabwe | 2–1 | Malawi | Lilongwe |
| 17:00 CAT | Chinyerere 3', 37' | Report | Chinzimu 40' | Stadium: Bingu National Stadium; Referee: Patricia Banda (Zambia) |

| 30 November 3 Nations Tournament | Malawi | 1–1 | Zambia | Lilongwe |
| 17:00 CAT | Kadzere 56' | Report | Nanyangwe 65' | Stadium: Bingu National Stadium |

=== 2026 ===
| 18 February 2025 COSAFA Championship | South Africa | 2–0 | Malawi | Polokwane, South Africa |
| 15:00 CAT | Holweni 63'; Mokoma 90+1' | Report | | Stadium: Old Peter Mokaba Stadium; Referee: Anna Banda (Zambia) |

| 21 February 2025 COSAFA Championship | Malawi | 8–1 | South Africa | Polokwane, South Africa |
| 15:30 CAT | Khumalo 4', 44'; Henry 10', 11', 45+2'; Chikupila 39'; V. Mkandawire 50'; Phikani 57' | Report | | Stadium: Seshego Stadium; Referee: Laurinda Caluvi (Angola) |

| 24 February 2025 COSAFA Championship | Angola | 0–1 | Malawi | Polokwane, South Africa |
| 15:00 CAT | | Report | Khumalo 77' | Stadium: Old Peter Mokaba Stadium; Referee: Anna Banda (Zambia) |

| 11 April 2026 FIFA Series | Australia | 5–0 | Malawi | Nairobi, Kenya |
| 13:00 CAT | Van Egmond 5'; Kerr 41'; Chidiac 60'; McNamara 86'; McKenna 90+4' | Report | | Stadium: Nyayo National Stadium; Referee: Emmanuela Clement (South Sudan) |

| 15 April 2026 FIFA Series | India | 3–2 | Malawi | Nairobi, Kenya |
| 14:00 CAT | Oraon 19'; Singh 45+1'; Selladurai 84' | Report | Khumalo 43'; Henry 60' | Stadium: Nyayo National Stadium; Referee: Yordanos Mulugeta (Ethiopia) |

== See also ==
- Malawi women's national football team
