= 2022 COSAFA Women's Championship squads =

List of players competing at the 9th edition of the COSAFA Women's Championship

This article lists the squads for the 2022 COSAFA Women's Championship, the 10th edition of the COSAFA Women's Championship. The tournament is a women's international football tournament for national teams organised by COSAFA, teams from Southern Africa, and was held in Nelson Mandela Bay from 31 August to 11 September 2022. In the tournament were involved twelve national teams: eleven teams from COSAFA and one team from CECAFA, who were invited as guests. Each national team registered a squad of 20 players.

The age listed for each player is on 31 August 2022, the first day of the tournament. The numbers of caps and goals listed for each player do not include any matches played after the start of tournament. The club listed is the club for which the player last played a competitive match prior to the tournament. The nationality for each club reflects the national association (not the league) to which the club is affiliated. A flag is included for coaches that are of a different nationality than their own national team.

== Group A ==
=== Angola ===
Coach:Souza Garcia

- Caps and goals accurate up to and including 7 April 2021.

No.	Pos.	Player	Date of birth (age)	Caps	Goals	Club
1	GK	Domingas Kananga	2 March 1995 (age 31)		0	(Angolan Football Federation) Paulo
12	GK	Rita Luís José			0	(Angolan Football Federation)
12	GK	Odilia Kaita			0	(Angolan Football Federation)
3	DF	Indira Fernandes Luís			0	(Angolan Football Federation)
3	DF	Manuela Simão	4 April 2002 (age 24)	4	0	(Angolan Football Federation) Sagrada Esperança
3	DF	Emacleny Lando			0	(Angolan Football Federation)
5	DF	Matondo Matuvova		6	0	(Angolan Football Federation) Sagrada Esperança
13	DF	Fátima Faria		2	0	(Angolan Football Federation) Kilamba City
15	DF	Vanuza Francisco		0	0	(Angolan Football Federation)
8	MF	Francisca de Azevedo	19 September 1997 (age 29)	8	0	(Angolan Football Federation) Sagrada Esperança
6	MF	Sara Luvunga	12 September 1999 (age 27)	6	0	(Angolan Football Federation) 1º de Agosto
8	MF	Rosa Ngueve Jamba			0	(Angolan Football Federation)
8	MF	Marlene da Silva			0	(Angolan Football Federation)
14	MF	Beatriz Augusto	29 April 1997 (age 29)	6	1	(Angolan Football Federation) Kilamba City
8	MF	Lourdes Chitandula			0	(Angolan Football Federation)
17	MF	Teresa Evaristo	24 April 1999 (age 27)	7	0	(Angolan Football Federation) Paulo
18	MF	Margarete Salvador	16 August 2002 (age 24)	5	0	(Angolan Football Federation) 1º de Agosto
21	MF	Ana Manuel da Costa		1	0	(Angolan Football Federation) 1º de Agosto
20	MF	Ladaínha Silyomunu Haufiku	4 March 1992 (age 34)	5	0	(Angolan Football Federation) Atlético do Cunene
8	MF	Victorina Muhongo			0	(Angolan Football Federation)
7	FW	Cristina Makua	14 May 1995 (age 31)	7	3	(Angolan Football Federation) Sagrada Esperança
10	FW	Zeferina Caupe	11 July 1999 (age 27)	5	1	(Angolan Football Federation) Exército

=== Mauritius ===
Coach: Anielle Collet

The squad was announced on 22 August 2022.

No.	Pos.	Player	Date of birth (age)	Club
	GK	Nancy Betty		
	GK	Sejal Teeluck		
	GK	Tan Wee Anastasia		
	DF	Anaelle Rassoie		
	DF	Anaelle Auguste		
	DF	Laeticia Dadard		
	DF	Lauricourt Camilla		
	DF	Claudinette Cupidon		
	DF	Jerome Martina		
	MF	Audrey Anthony		
	MF	Elodie Aliphon (captain)		
	MF	Coralie Verloppe		
	MF	Claudina Evenor		
	MF	Nausheen Mamode		
	MF	Macaque Emilie		
	MF	Julie Gopal		
	MF	Quirin Joannie		
	FW	Fiona Felicite		
	FW	Jerusha Ramasawmy		
	FW	Jheemla Brooklyn		
	FW	Orphelie Marianne		
	FW	Tracy Anais Fourneau		

=== Mozambique ===
Coach: Luís Victor Fumo

The squad was announced on 26 August 2022.

No.	Pos.	Player	Date of birth (age)	Caps	Goals	Club
	GK	Assumine Linge				(Mozambican Football Federation) Ferroviario da Beira
	GK	Esperança Matsinhe	8 June 2001 (aged 21)	2	0	(Mozambican Football Federation) Cosmos FC
	GK	Neima Nhamire		0	0	(Mozambican Football Federation) Benfica de Laulane
	DF	Suzana Tiago		0	0	(Mozambican Football Federation) U.D de Lichinga
	DF	Virginia Fernando	24 January 2000 (aged 22)	3	0	(Mozambican Football Federation) U.D de Lichinga
	DF	Eufasia Soto		0	0	(Mozambican Football Federation) Costa do Sol
	DF	Amélia Mazembe			0	(Mozambican Football Federation) Ferroviario da Beira
	DF	Isaura Chidembo			0	(Mozambican Football Federation) Desportivo da Matola
	DF	Amélia Banze	17 March 1993 (aged 29)	2	0	(Mozambican Football Federation) Matchedje
	DF	Rosa Mainque	29 April 1999 (aged 23)	3	0	(Mozambican Football Federation) Costa do Sol
	MF	Laura Mucheluane		0	0	(Mozambican Football Federation) Cocorico da Beira
	MF	Emília Joao	5 November 1997 (aged 24)	2	0	(Mozambican Football Federation) Cocorico da Beira
	MF	Albertina Pondja			0	(Mozambican Football Federation) Costa do Sol
	MF	Deolinda Gove	6 August 1999 (aged 23)	0	0	(Mozambican Football Federation) Benfica de Laulane
	MF	Eunencia Machava			0	(Mozambican Football Federation) Associacao Black Bulls
	MF	Lonica Tsanwane			0	Young Buffaloes
	MF	Isabel Jorge			0	(Mozambican Football Federation) Matchedje
	MF	Amalia Pfumo			0	(Mozambican Football Federation) Clube dos Amigos
	FW	Cina Manuel	9 July 1995 (aged 27)	3	2	(Mozambican Football Federation) Uniao Desportiva De Lichinga
	FW	Cidália Cuta	27 October 1998 (aged 23)	3	2	(Mozambican Football Federation) Costa do Sol
	FW	Ermilinda Guinda		0	0	(Mozambican Football Federation) C Autarquico de chomoio
	FW	Elsa Mulingadale		0	0	(Mozambican Football Federation) Clube Unidos Da Manga

=== South Africa ===
Coach: Simphiwe Dludlu

The squad was announced on 16 August 2022.

No.	Pos.	Player	Date of birth (age)	Club
	GK	Kebotseng Moletsane	3 March 1995 (aged 27)	(South African Football Association) Bloemfontein Celtic
	GK	Dineo Magagula	14 October 1994 (aged 27)	(South African Football Association) University of Johannesburg
	GK	Tshidi Muruoa		(South African Football Association) TUT
	DF	Fikile Magama	19 January 2002 (aged 20)	(South African Football Association) University of the Western Cape
	DF	Cimone Sauls	30 September 2004 (aged 17)	(South African Football Association) JVW
	DF	Koketso Tlailane	7 December 1992 (aged 29)	(South African Football Association) TUT
	DF	Nothando Vilakazi	28 October 1988 (aged 33)	(South African Football Association) TUT
	DF	Tiisetso Makhubela	24 April 1997 (aged 25)	(South African Football Association) Mamelodi Sundowns
	DF	Lonathemba Mhlongo	23 August 2002 (aged 20)	(South African Football Association) University of the Western Cape
	DF	Thato Letsoso	24 August 1996 (aged 26)	(South African Football Association) TUT
	DF	Sharol Ramaoka		(South African Football Association) TUT
	MF	Jamie-Leigh Witbooi		(South African Football Association) Vasco Da Gama
	MF	Mmabatho Mogale		(South African Football Association) University of Pretoria
	MF	Sphumelele Shamase	16 January 2002 (aged 20)	(South African Football Association) University of Johannesburg
	MF	Oratile Mokwena	21 March 2001 (aged 21)	(South African Football Association) Mamelodi Sundowns
	MF	Nonhlanhla Mthandi	19 August 1995 (aged 27)	(South African Football Association) Mamelodi Sundowns
	MF	Sinazo Ntshota		(South African Football Association) City Ladies
	MF	Busisiwe Ndimeni	25 June 1991 (aged 31)	(South African Football Association) TUT
	FW	Lelona Daweti	8 September 1999 (aged 22)	(South African Football Association) Mamelodi Sundowns
	FW	Zethembiso Vilakazi	16 February 2002 (aged 20)	(South African Football Association) Lindelani
	FW	Michelle Sampson		(South African Football Association) Richmond United
	FW	Amanda Mkhize		(South African Football Association) Durban Ladies
	FW	Lithemba Sam		(South African Football Association) Cape Town Roses

== Group B ==
=== Eswatini ===
Coach:Simephi Mamba

No.	Pos.	Player	Date of birth (age)	Club
	GK	Gcinile Dlamini		(Eswatini Football Association)
	GK	Eunice Mbuli		(Eswatini Football Association)
	DF	Samkelisiwe Malinga		(Eswatini Football Association)
	DF	Samkelisiwe Fakudze		(Eswatini Football Association)
	DF	Hyness Shongwe		(Eswatini Football Association)
	DF	Ntobeko Sihlongonyane		(Eswatini Football Association)
	DF	Simangele Sikhondze		(Eswatini Football Association)
	DF	Nonduduzo Mhlanga		(Eswatini Football Association)
	DF	Ciniso Hlatshwako		(Eswatini Football Association)
	DF	Ncedo Gamedze		(Eswatini Football Association)
	MF	Nokuthula Ndlovu(esw)		(Eswatini Football Association) Manzini Wanderers Football Club
	MF	Simile Marks		(Eswatini Football Association)
	MF	Condile Ndzimandze		(Eswatini Football Association)
	MF	Phumzile Dlamini		(Eswatini Football Association)
	MF	Londiwe Maziya		(Eswatini Football Association)
	MF	Nokuthula Dlamini		(Eswatini Football Association)
	MF	Tibonile Dlamini		(Eswatini Football Association)
	MF	Thandolwethu Simelane		(Eswatini Football Association)
	MF	Sisanda Ndzinisa		(Eswatini Football Association)
	FW	Phumlile Kunene		(Eswatini Football Association)
	FW	Welile Shabangu		(Eswatini Football Association)
	FW	Lesego Mokgale		(Eswatini Football Association)
	FW	Nelile Mnisi		(Eswatini Football Association)

=== Lesotho ===
Coach:Pule Khojane

No.	Pos.	Player	Date of birth (age)	Club
	GK	Mpolokeng Mothomots'oanaz		
	GK	Mamakhabane Makibinyane		
	GK	Boitumelo Nkeane		
	DF	Ntsatsi Khakanyo		
	DF	Maqabane Mokhothu		
	DF	Bokang Ntsane		
	DF	Thato Sentje		
	DF	Ts'oanelo Leboka		
	DF	Mosili Mots'oeneng		
	DF	Lerato Mphou		
	DF	Mathebe Ramphielo		
	MF	Mosele Pita		
	MF	Nts'abeng Pelea		
	MF	Molemo Mokhothu		
	MF	Mats'eliso Nts'asa		
	MF	Maseriti Mohlolo		
	MF	Boitumelo Rabale	5 August 1996 (aged 26)	(Football Australia) CBU Capers
	MF	Kefuoe Makoa		
	FW	Lits'eoana Maloro		
	FW	Nteboheleng Mohoshela		
	FW	Nthabeleng Potsane		
	FW	Phuzile Molefe		
	FW	Mats'eliso Makutoane		

=== Namibia ===
Coach:Paulus Shipanga

- Caps and goals accurate up to and including 6 April 2021.

No.	Pos.	Player	Date of birth (age)	Caps	Club
	GK	Melisa Matheus	14 June 1998 (aged 24)		(Namibia) Tura Magic
	GK	Agnes Kauzuu	22 December 1992 (aged 29)		(Namibia) Tura Magic
	GK	Marinskey Vries			
	DF	Veweziwa Kotjipati	28 September 1992 (aged 29)		(Germany) Borussia Mönchengladbach II
	DF	Anna Shaende	27 October 1999 (aged 22)		
	DF	Emma Naris (captain)	8 November 1996 (aged 25)		(Namibia) Tura Magic
	DF	Selma Enkali	22 December 1999 (aged 22)		(Namibia) Tura Magic
	DF	Nicole Philander	30 July 2000 (aged 22)		(Namibia) Tura Magic
	DF	Veronika Van Wyk	6 January 1999 (aged 23)		(Namibia) Tura Magic
	DF	Julia Rutjindo	18 April 2000 (aged 22)		
	MF	Shanice Daries	3 September 2000 (aged 21)		(Namibia) Girls & Goals
	MF	Millicent Hikuam	6 July 1998 (aged 24)		(Namibia) Tura Magic
	MF	Asteria Angula	11 January 1999 (aged 23)		(Namibia) Girls & Goals
	MF	Lilie Kasheeta	4 April 1999 (aged 23)		
	MF	Muhinatjo Hanavi	11 February 2003 (aged 19)		
	FW	Zenatha Coleman	25 September 1993 (aged 28)		(Turkey) Fenerbahçe
	FW	Kylie Van Wyk	1 May 1999 (aged 23)		(Namibia) Girls & Goals
	FW	Albertina Aludhilu	8 January 2000 (aged 22)		
	FW	Beverly Uueziua	26 May 1999 (aged 23)		(Namibia) Girls & Goals
	FW	Ivone Kooper	16 January 1999 (aged 23)		(Namibia) Tura Magic
	FW	Memory Ngonda	11 February 1998 (aged 24)		(Namibia) Tura Magic
	FW	Juliana Blou	17 May 1995 (aged 27)		(Namibia) Tura Magic
	FW	Fiola Vliete	22 October 1998 (aged 23)		(Namibia) V-Power Angels

=== Zambia ===
Coach: Bruce Mwape

No.	Pos.	Player	Date of birth (age)	Caps	Club	
18	GK	Eunice Sakala			0	(Football Association of Zambia) Nkwazi Queens
18	GK	Agness Banda			0	(Football Association of Zambia) National Assembly
1	GK	Catherine Musonda	20 February 1998 (aged 24)	3	0	(Football Association of Zambia) Indeni Roses
	DF	Vast Phiri	3 February 1996 (aged 26)	1	0	(Football Association of Zambia) ZESCO United
17	DF	Esther Banda	21 November 2004 (aged 17)	1	0	(Football Association of Zambia) Bauleni United Sports Academy
4	DF	Esther Siamfuko	8 August 2004 (aged 18)	6	0	(Football Association of Zambia) Queens Academy
4	DF	Agness Musesa			0	(Football Association of Zambia)
3	DF	Lushomo Mweemba	10 April 2001 (aged 21)	27	1	(Football Association of Zambia) Green Buffaloes
13	DF	Martha Tembo	8 March 1998 (aged 24)	21	0	(Football Association of Zambia) Green Buffaloes
4	DF	Judith Soko			0	(Football Association of Zambia) YASA
8	DF	Margaret Belemu	24 February 1997 (aged 25)	26	2	(Chinese Football Association) Shanghai Shengli
14	MF	Ireen Lungu	6 October 1997 (aged 24)	16	4	(Football Association of Zambia) Green Buffaloes
6	MF	Mary Wilombe	22 September 1997 (aged 24)	22	1	(Football Association of Zambia) Red Arrows
12	MF	Evarine Katongo	29 December 2002 (aged 19)	12	0	(Football Association of Zambia) ZISD Queens
12	MF	Natasha Witika			0	(Nigeria Football Federation) Bayelsa Queens
21	MF	Avell Chitundu	30 July 1997 (aged 25)	19	3	(Football Association of Zambia) ZESCO United
12	MF	Maweta Chilenga			0	(Football Association of Zambia) BUSA
7	MF	Misozi Zulu	11 October 1994 (aged 27)	12	0	(Turkish Football Federation) Hakkarigücü Spor
	FW	Barbra Banda	20 March 2000 (aged 22)	10	22	(Chinese Football Association) Shanghai Shengli
22	FW	Natasha Nanyangwe	27 July 1999 (aged 23)	3	0	(Football Association of Zambia) Green Buffaloes
	FW	Ochumba Oseke	1 July 2002 (aged 20)	20	4	(Football Association of Zambia) Red Arrows
	FW	Eneless Phiri				(Football Association of Zambia) Police Doves
11	FW	Xiomara Mapepa	4 July 2002 (aged 20)	11	2	(Football Association of Zambia) Lusaka Dynamos

== Group C ==
=== Botswana ===
Coach:Gaoletlhoo Nkutlwisang

No.	Pos.	Player	Date of birth (age)	Club
23	GK	Lesego Moeng	3 February 1998 (aged 24)	(Botswana Football Association) BDF
	GK	Bame Mokibe		(Botswana Football Association) Double Action
	GK	Doris Motshfgwf		(Botswana Football Association) Wonder Girls
	GK	Tlamelo Peresi	1996 or 1997	(Botswana Football Association) Double Action
12	DF	Bonang Otlhagile	7 September 1986 (aged 35)	(Botswana Football Association) Double Action
	DF	Pearl Sikwane		(Botswana Football Association) Prisons Girls
5	DF	Theo George	2000 or 2001	(Botswana Football Association) Wonder Girls
	DF	Lerato Motlogelwa	2003 or 2004	(Botswana Football Association) Double Action
3	DF	Nancy Baeletsi	21 March 1996 (aged 26)	(Botswana Football Association) Prisons
	DF	Goitsemang Tlamba	7 August 1998 (aged 24)	(Botswana Football Association) BDF
6	MF	Messia Radinonyane		(Botswana Football Association) Orapa All Starts
	MF	Laone Moloi	26 November 2000 (aged 21)	(Botswana Football Association) Double Action
8	MF	Lone Gaofetoge	16 July 2001 (aged 21)	(Botswana Football Association) Geronah
21	MF	Annah Sechane	7 February 2001 (aged 21)	(Botswana Football Association) Township Rollers
6	MF	Isegofatso Mosotho		(Botswana Football Association) Mazottu FC
6	MF	Oratile Rathari		(Botswana Football Association) Double Action
10	MF	Lesego Radiakanyo	27 June 1999 (aged 23)	(Botswana Football Association) Double Action
13	MF	Keitumetse Dithebe	17 July 2002 (aged 20)	(Botswana Football Association) Mexican Girls
20	FW	Ontlametse Gaonyadiwe	12 January 2001 (aged 21)	(Botswana Football Association) Double Action
	FW	Leungo Sengwelo	23 December 2001 (aged 20)	(Botswana Football Association) Ambassadors
24	FW	Michelle Abueng	6 May 2001 (aged 21)	(Botswana Football Association) BDF
24	FW	Piggy Manewe		(Botswana Football Association) T/Rollers

=== Comoros ===
Coach:Mohamed Bouhari

No.	Pos.	Player	Date of birth (age)	Club
	GK	Aïcha Saïd		(French Football Federation) Olympique de Marseille
	GK	Nasrin Tsara Hadharay		(Ligue réunionnaise de football) SDEFA
	GK	Taouhida Soulaimana		(Comoros Football Federation) Ouvanga Espoir
	DF	Eve Moudashy Chadouli		(French Football Federation) US Grigny
	DF	Halima Attoumane		(Comoros Football Federation) Ouvanga Espoir
	DF	Wafat Mari		(French Football Federation) RC Saint-Denis
	DF	Diore Mariame Saïd		(French Football Federation) GPSO Issy
	DF	Aliya Saïd		(French Football Federation) Clermont Foot
	DF	Nourouzamane Ahmed		(Comoros Football Federation) Ouvanga Espoir
	DF	Nousrat Mistoihi		(Comoros Football Federation) FC Ouani
	MF	Soiyfati Ali		(French Football Federation) FC Rousset
	MF	Hairyat Abdourahmane		(Comoros Football Federation) Olympic de Moroni
	MF	Zaharouna Haoudadji		(French Football Federation) AJ Auxerre
	MF	Inès Alina Mohamed		(French Football Federation) FC Lyon
	MF	Bibi Raïssa Housseni		(French Football Federation) NDC Angers
	MF	Anissa Maoulida		(French Football Federation) EFCL Blois
	MF	Salmata Samantha Itrisso		(French Football Federation) Saint Henry FC
	FW	Haloua Ahamada		(French Football Federation) CPB Brequigny
	FW	Faïza Houmadi		(French Football Federation) Clermont Foot
	FW	Anlaouia Hadhirami Ali		(Comoros Football Federation) Olympic de Moroni
	FW	Roukiat Mohamed Ahamadi		(Comoros Football Federation) Belle Lumière de Djoyezi
	FW	Naisha Athoumani		(French Football Federation) Saint Henry FC
	FW	Maltoufa Mchangama		(Comoros Football Federation) Olympic de Moroni

=== Malawi ===
Coach:Thom Mkolongo

No.	Pos.	Player	Date of birth (age)	Caps	Goals	Club
	GK	Ruth Mhango				(Football Association of Malawi) DD Sunshine
	GK	Martha Banda				(Football Association of Malawi) Nyasa Big Bullets Women
	GK	Mercy Sikelo				(Football Association of Malawi) Ntopwa Super Queens
	DF	Ruth Nyirongo				(Football Association of Malawi) DD Sunshine
	DF	Emily Jossam				(Football Association of Malawi) Nyasa Big Bullets
	DF	Chimwemwe Madise				(Football Association of Zambia) Lusaka Dynamos
	DF	Patricia Nyirenda	8 April 1998 (aged 24)			(Football Association of Zambia) Lusaka Dynamos
	DF	Ireen Khumalo				(Football Association of Malawi) Ascent Academy
	DF	Fatsireni Kazembe				(Football Association of Malawi) Civil Service United Women
	DF	Benardetta Mkandawire				(Football Association of Malawi) Nyasa Big Bullets Women
	MF	Rose Kabzele				(Football Association of Malawi) Ascent Academy
	MF	Chikondi Gondwe	19 September 1998 (aged 23)			(Football Association of Malawi) CY
	MF	Mphatso Gondwe				(Football Association of Malawi) all DD Sunshine
	MF	Wezzie Mvula				(Football Association of Malawi) DD Sunshine
	MF	Madyina Nguluwe	18 June 1996 (aged 26)			(Football Association of Malawi) DD Sunshine
	MF	Jessie Joseph				(Football Association of Malawi) Civil Service United Women
	FW	Asimenye Simwaka	8 August 1997 (aged 25)			(Football Association of Malawi) Topik
	FW	Sabinah Thom	13 March 1996 (aged 26)			(Tanzania Football Federation) Simba SC
	FW	Mary Chavinda				(Football Association of Malawi) Nyasa Big Bullets Women
	FW	Fazila Chiyembekeza				(Nigeria Football Federation) Rivers Angels
	FW	Vanesa Chikupira				(Football Association of Malawi) Nyasa Big Bullets Women

=== Tanzania ===
Coach:Bakari Shime

No.	Pos.	Player	Date of birth (age)	Club
8	GK	Zulfa Ally		
8	GK	Husna Mtunda		
8	GK	Najiat Abass		
2	DF	Violeth Mchela	1 August 2001 (age 25)	(Tanzania Football Federation) Simba Queens
5	DF	Fatuma Issa	9 May 1995 (age 31)	(Tanzania Football Federation) Simba Queens
8	DF	Mwamvua Seif		
8	DF	Chirster Bahela		
8	DF	Noela Patrick		
8	DF	Anastazia Katunzi		
4	MF	Amina Bilali (Captain )		(Tanzania Football Federation) Yanga Princess
19	MF	Irene Kisisa		(Tanzania Football Federation) Yanga Princess
8	MF	Donisia Minja		
12	MF	Janeth Pangamwene		(Tanzania Football Federation) Mlandizi Queens
8	MF	Koku Ally		
11	FW	Diana Msewa		(Royal Moroccan Football Federation) AUSFAZ
17	FW	Enekia Kasonga	20 May 2002 (age 24)	(Royal Moroccan Football Federation) AUSFAZ
10	FW	Opa Clement	14 February 2001 (age 25)	(Tanzania Football Federation) Simba Queens
7	FW	Mwanahamis Omary	16 October 1989 (age 36)	(Tanzania Football Federation) Simba Queens
8	FW	Joyce Lema		
22	FW	Aisha Juma		(Tanzania Football Federation) Yanga Princess
8	FW	Neema Paul		
8	FW	Husna Mpanja		
