= 2025 Tanzania Women's Community Shield final =

2025 Tanzania Women's Community Shield
Ngao ya Jamii ya Wanawake
JKT Queens	Simba Queens
2	1
- JKT Queens beat Simba Queens 2-1
- Date: 12 October 2025
- Venue: KMC Complex, Dar es Salaam
- Man of the Match: Winfrida Gerald (JKT Queens)
- Referee: Neema Msangi
- Attendance: 6,000

The 2025 Tanzania Women's Community Shield final was the final match of the 2025 Tanzania Women's Community Shield, the fourth edition of the competition since its establishment, and the second under the new four-team format. It was played between JKT Queens and Simba Queens on 12 October 2025 at KMC Complex Stadium in Dar es Salaam, Tanzania.

JKT Queens beat Simba Queens 2–1 on regular time, winning their second consecutive Community Shield title.

== Route to the final ==
JKT Queens		Round	Simba Queens	
Opponent	Result	2025 Tanzania W-Community Shield	Opponent	Result
Yanga Princess	1–1(6–5 p)	Semi-finals	Mashujaa Queens	2–0

== Match ==
12 October 2025
16:00 UTC

JKT Queens	2–1	Simba Queens

KMC Complex, Dar es Salaam
Attendance: 10,000
Referee: Tatu Malogo

GK	18	(Tanzania) Najiat Abbasi
RB	3	(Tanzania) Lydia Maximillian
CB	26	(Tanzania) Christer Bahera(c)
CB	15	(Tanzania) Ester Kaseke
LB	12	(Tanzania) Sarah Joel
DM	6	(Tanzania) Donisia Minja
CM	25	(Tanzania) Janeth Pangamwene
CM	13	(Tanzania) Elizabeth Chenge
RW	24	(Tanzania) Winfrida Gerald
LW	8	(Tanzania) Stumai Abdallah
CF	23	(Tanzania) Jamila Rajabu
Substitutes:
GK	-	(Tanzania) Christer Brazil
DF	-	(Tanzania) Neema John
MF	-	(Tanzania) Winfrida Mugwa
DF	-	(Tanzania) Asha Rashid
Head Coach:
(Tanzania) Kessy Juma

GK	1	(Uganda) Ruth Aturo
LB	11	(Uganda) Zainah Nandende
CB	23	(Tanzania) Ester Mayala (c)
CB	20	(Kenya) Ruth Ingosi
RB	2	(Tanzania) Doto Tossi
CM	22	(Cameroon) Brice Zanga
CM	4	(Kenya) Elizabeth Wambui
AM	17	(Kenya) Vivian Corazone
LW	27	(Kenya) Cythia Musungu
RW	12	(Tanzania) Asha Juma
CF	10	(Tanzania) Aisha Mnuka
Substitutes:
GK	-	(Tanzania) Elizabeth Naahon
DF	-	(Tanzania) Fatuma Issa
MF	-	(Tanzania) Emiliana Isaya
FW	-	(Kenya) fasila Odhiambo
FW	-	(Kenya) Jentrix Shikangwa
Head Coach:
(Tanzania) Elieneza Nsanganzelu

Man of the Match:
Winfrida Gerald (JKT Queens)

Assistant referees:
Janeth Balama
Glory Tesha
Fourth official:
Amina Kyando

Match rules

- 90 minutes
- Penalty shoot-out if scores level
