= 2025 Tanzania Women's Community Shield =

Tanzania Womens football competition

Ngao ya Jamii ya Wanawake

Tournament details
- Host country: TAN
- City: Dar es Salaam
- Dates: 9–12 October 2025
- Teams: 4

Final positions
- Champions: JKT Queens (2nd title)
- Runners-up: Simba Queens
- Third place: Yanga Princess
- Fourth place: Mashujaa Queens

Tournament statistics
- Matches played: 5
- Goals scored: 10 (2 per match)
- Top scorer(s): Jeanine Mukandiyisenga (Yanga Princess) (3 goals)
- Best player: Winfrida Gerald (JKT Queens)
- Best goalkeeper: Najiat Abbasi (JKT Queens)

The 2025 Tanzania Women's Community Shield, officially Ngao ya Jamii ya Wanawake it's an annual football competition contested by teams that were successful in the preceding season of Tanzania W-Premier League.

JKT Queens were the defending champions. by defeating Yanga Princess 1-0 in a match played at the KMC Stadium, Mwenge, Dar es Salaam.

== Format ==
The tournament consists of four teams: the Champions, Runner-up, Third place and Fourth place of the Tanzanian Women's Premier League Season.

Fixtures were announced on 29 September 2025.

=== Qualified teams ===
following four teams qualified for the tournament.

Team	Method of qualification
JKT Queens	Champions
Simba Queens	Runner-up
Yanga Princess	Third place
Mashujaa Queens	Fourth place

== Bracket ==
Semi-finals
9 October 202
JKT Queens (p)	1 (6)
Yanga Princess	1 (5)
9 October 2025
Simba Queens	1
Mashujaa Queens	0

Final
12 October 2025
JKT Queens	2
Simba Queens	1
Third place match
12 October 2025
Yanga Princess	3
Mashujaa Queens	0

== Matches ==
All times are UTC (UTC+3).

=== Semi-finals ===
20 October 2024	Simba Queens	2–0	Mashujaa Queens	Dar es Salaam
13:00	Asha omary 33'; Aisha Mnuka 71'			Stadium: KMC Complex; Referee: Tatu Malogo

9 October 2025	JKT Queens	1–1 (6–5 p)	Yanga Princess	Dar es Salaam
16:00	Winfrida Gerald		Jeanine Mukandiyisenga	Stadium: KMC Complex

=== Third place match ===
12 October 2025	Yanga Princess	3–0	Mashujaa Queens	Dar es Salaam
13:00				Stadium: KMC Complex

=== Final ===
12 October 2025
16:00 UTC

JKT Queens	2–1	Simba Queens

KMC Complex, Dar es Salaam
Attendance: 10,000
Referee: Tatu Malogo
