= 2025–26 Tanzanian Women's Premier League =

Tanzanian Women's Premier League
- Season: 2025–26
- Dates: 14 November 2025 – 28 May 2026
- Matches: 63
- Goals: 161 (2.56 per match)
- Top goalscorer: Jeanine Mukandayisenga (15 goals)
- Biggest home win: JKT Queens 6–0 Bilo FC (12 December 2025); JKT Queens 6–0 Mashujaa Queens (27 December 2025)
- Biggest away win: Geita Queens 0–4 Fountain Princess (19 November 2025); Ceasiaa Queens 0–4 Yanga Princess (2 January 2026)
- Highest scoring: Fountain Princess 4–5 Yanga Princess (13 January 2026)
- Longest winning run: 6 matches Simba Queens
- Longest unbeaten run: 11 matches Simba Queens
- Longest winless run: 8 matches Ceasiaa Queens
- Longest losing run: 4 matches Ceasiaa Queens
- All statistics correct as of 28 January 2026.

The 2025–26 Tanzanian Women's Premier League is the 10th season of the Tanzanian Women's Premier League, the top flight of women's association football in Tanzania. It is the first season with new format of 12 teams. The competition is run by the Tanzania Football Federation.

JKT Queens entered the season as defending champions.(4st title crown overall) in the previous season.

== Teams ==
The league consisted of 12 teams; the top 10 teams from the previous season, and two promoted.

=== Locations ===
Location of clubs in Tanzania for the 2025–26 Tanzanian Women's Premier League season

=== Stadiums ===
Note: Table lists in alphabetical order.

Team	Location	Stadium	Capacity
Alliance Girls	Mwanza (Nyamagana)	Nyamagana Stadium	20,000
Bilo Queens	Mwanza	CCM Kirumba Stadium	35,000
Bunda Queens	Dar es Salaam (Ilala)	Karume Memorial Stadium	3,000
Ceasiaa Queens	Iringa	Samora Stadium	1,000
Fountain Gate Princess	Manyara (Babati)	Tanzanite Kwaraa	10,000
Geita Queens	Geita	Samora Stadium	10,000
JKT Queens	Dar es Salaam (Mbweni)	Major General Isamuhyo Stadium	15,000
Mashujaa Queens	Dar es Salaam (Kigamboni)	TFF Technical Center	3,000
Ruangwa Queens	Lindi (Ruangwa)	Majaliwa Stadium	20,000
Simba Queens	Dar es Salaam (Kariakoo)	KMC Complex	10,000
Tausi FC	Dar es Salaam	KMC Complex	10,000
Yanga Princess	Dar es Salaam (Kariakoo)	Chamazi Stadium	10,000

== League table ==
Pos	Team	Pld	W	D	L	GF	GA	GD	Pts	Qualification or relegation
1	Simba Queens	11	10	1	0	25	2	+23	31	Qualification for the CAF W–Champions League
2	Yanga Princess	11	10	0	1	34	10	+24	30	Qualification for the Samia Cup
3	JKT Queens	9	6	2	1	24	3	+21	20	Qualification for the Samia Cup
4	Alliance Girls	10	6	1	3	9	8	+1	19	Qualification for the Samia Cup
5	Fountain Gate Princess	11	5	2	4	19	14	+5	17	
6	Mashujaa Queens	10	4	1	5	13	17	−4	13	
7	Tausi FC	11	4	2	5	11	14	−3	11 (Note: Tausi FC were deducted 3 points by TFF as punishment for not play match with Mashujaa Queen, under Women's Premier league regulations article 32.)	
8	Bunda Queens	11	3	3	5	7	15	−8	9 (Note: Bunda Queen were deducted 3 points by TFF as punishment for not play match with JKT Queens, under Women's Premier league regulations article 32.)	
9	Geita Queens	10	3	0	7	7	22	−15	9	
10	Ceasiaa Queens	11	2	2	7	7	16	−9	8	
11	Ruangwa Queens	11	1	1	9	3	18	−15	4	Relegation to the W–Regional Champions league
12	Bilo Queens	10	1	1	8	2	22	−20	4	Relegation to the W–Regional Champions league

Updated to match(es) played on 30 January 2026. Source: Tanzania Football Federation
Rules for classification: 1) Points; 2) Goal difference; 3) Goals scored; 4) Head-to-head goal difference; 5) Head-to-head goals scored 6) Away goals scored

== Results ==
Each team plays each other twice (22 matches each), once at home and once away.

Home \ Away	ALL	BIL	BUN	CEA	FOU	GGW	JKT	MAS	RUA	SIM	TAU	YNG
Alliance Girls	—		0–0	1–0	1–0	2–1						
Bilo Queens		—	1–2		0–3				1–0		0–0	
Bunda Queens			—	1–0					1–0		1–1	
Ceasiaa Queens				—	1–2		0–3			0–1		0–4
Fountain Gate Princess					—		1–1			0–3		4–5
Geita Queens		1–0		1–0		—			3–1			0–4
JKT Queens		6–0	3–0				—	6–0			2–0	
Mashujaa Queens	1–0				2–3	4–1		—				
Ruangwa Queens								1–0	—	0–1		0–3
Simba Queens		4–0	3–0				1–1			—		
Tausi FC	1–2							0–3	3–0		—	2–3
Yanga Princess	4–0					5–0		4–1		0–2		—

Updated to match(es) played on 14 November 2025. Source: Tanzania Football Federation
Legend: Blue = home team win; Yellow = draw; Red = away team win.

=== Results by round ===
Team ╲ Round	1
Alliance Girls	
Bilo Queens	L
Bunda Queens	
Ceasiaa Queens	L
Fountain Gate Princess	
Geita Queens	W
JKT Queens	
Mashujaa Queens	
Ruangwa Queens	L
Simba Queens	W
Tausi FC	
Yanga Princess	W

Updated to match(es) played on 14 November 2025. Source: Tanzania Football Federation
W = Win; D = Draw; L = Loss

== Season statistics ==
=== Top scorers ===
As of 13 January 2026

Rank	Player	Club	Goals
1	(Rwanda) Jeanine Mukandayisenga	Yanga Princess	15
2	(Kenya) Jentrix Shikangwa	Simba Queens	10
3	(Tanzania) Winfrida Gerald	JKT Queens	7
4	(Tanzania) Aisha Mnuka	Simba Queens	6
5	(Ethiopia) Aragesh tadess	Yanga Princess	6
6	(Rwanda) Zawadi Usanase	Simba Queens	6
7	(Tanzania) Neema Paul	Fountain Princess	5
8	(Tanzania) Veronica Mapunda	Mashujaa Queens	5
9	(Tanzania) Donisia Minja	JKT Queens	5
10	(Tanzania) Hellen Hamis	Fountain Princess	5

=== Hat-tricks ===
Key
^{4}	Player scored four goals
^{5}	Player scored five goals
^{6}	Player scored six goals
†	Player scored hat-trick as a substitute

Player	For	Against	Score	Date
(Kenya) Jentrix Shikangwa	Simba Queens	Bilo FC	4–0(H)	14 November 2025
(Tanzania) Veronica Mapunda	Mashujaa Queens	Geita Queens	4–1(H)	17 December 2025
(Tanzania) Winfrida Gerald	JKT Queens	Mashujaa Queens	6–0(H)	27 December 2025
(Rwanda) Jeanine Mukandayisenga	Yanga Princess	Mashujaa Queens	4–1(H)	7 January 2026
(Rwanda) Jeanine Mukandayisenga^{5} (2)	Yanga Princess	Fountain Princess	5–4(A)	13 January 2026
(Kenya) Jentrix Shikangwa (2)	Simba Queens	Geita Queens	4–0(H)	26 January 2026

== TFF Awards ==
=== Monthly awards ===
Month	Coach of the Month		Player of the Month	
Month	Coach	Club	Player	Club
December	(Tanzania) Mussa Mgosi	Simba Queens	(Tanzania) Winfrida Gerald	JKT Queens
January	(Tanzania) Edna Lema	Yanga Princess	(Rwanda) Jeanine Mukandayisenga	Yanga Princess
