= Safiatu Salifu =

Ghanaian footballer (born 2002)

Personal information
- Date of birth: 3 March 2002 (age 24)
- Position: Goalkeeper

Team information
- Current team: Yanga Princess
- Number: 22

Senior career*
Years	Team	Apps	(Gls)
20??–2022	Ampem Darkoa Ladies		
2023–	Yanga Princess		

International career^{‡}
- Ghana U17
- Ghana U20
2023–	Ghana	1	(0)
- * Club domestic league appearances and goals ‡ National team caps and goals as of 19 February 2023

Safiatu Salifu (born 3 March 2002) is a Ghanaian footballer who plays as a goalkeeper for Tanzanian Women's Premier League club Yanga Princess and the Ghana national team.

== Club career ==
Salifu played as a goalkeeper for Ampem Darkoa Ladies, with whom she won the Ghana Women's Premier League in 2023, recording ten clean sheets and allowing just four goals in 14 matches. She earned the title of Most Valuable Player once during the same season. She's currently playing for Tanzanian club Yanga Princess.

== Personal life ==
Salifu is Muslim.
