= Emily Jossam =

Malawian footballer

- Born: 18 August 1998 (age 28)
- Occupation: footballer
- Known for: defender on the national team

Emily Jossam (born 18 August 1998) is a Malawian footballer. She played for Nyasa Big Bullets and the Malawi national side. In 2023 she moved to Zambia's Zesco Ndola team.

== Life ==
Jossam was born in 1998. She became a professional footballer, in 2010, when she joined Blantyre Zero, who were later called Nyasa Bullets.

In November 2020 she was chosen to represent Malawi at the 2020 COSAFA Women's Championship in South Africa.

She was chosen again to represent Malawi in the 2021 COSAFA Women's Championship and she was chosen again in 2022. She was one of five Nyasa Bullets chosen - the others were Vanessa Chikupira, Bernadette Mkandawire, Mary Chavinda and goalkeeper Martha Banda.

In August 2023, she left Nyasa Bullets in Blantyre, where she was the team captain, to move to Zambia's ZESCO United F.C. team. In the following year her new team had a long unbeaten run in the 2024/2025 Eden University Women Super League. Jossam was one of several Malawian women footballers playing in Zambia in 2024. The others included Vanessa Chikupira, Ireen Kumalo and Madyina Ngulube. Wezzy Vitumbiko Mkandawire and Ruth Mhango were also Malawian footballers who played for the Zambian Institute for Sustainable Development Women's Football Club.
