= Chisomo =

Chisomo can be a feminine given name or a middle name. Notable people with the name include:

- Chisomo Kazisonga (born 1985), Malawian football defender and midfielder
- Chisomo Ngulube, Malawian journalist and editor
- Mary Chisomo Thom Navicha, Malawian politician
