= Mwajuma Noty Mirambo =

Tanzanian politician and footballer (born 1967)

- Born: 1967 (age 58–59); Dar es Salaam, Tanzania
- Occupations: Politician, footballer
- Political party: Union for Multiparty Democracy
- Spouse: Omar Farijala Hemed (m. 1994)

Mwajuma Noty Mirambo (born 1967) is a Tanzanian politician and footballer. Born in Dar es Salaam, she entered football in the 1980s and 1990s, eventually becoming manager of Sayari Women's F.C. and Yanga Princess. She was the Union for Multiparty Democracy's nominee for president of Tanzania in the 2025 general election, in which she gained 13,814 (0.04%) votes.

== Early life and career ==
Mwajuma Noty Mirambo was born in Dar es Salaam, Tanzania, in 1967. The youngest of three children, she spent her childhood in the Ilala District. She attended Mzimuni Primary School from 1974 to 1980 before going to Kaole Secondary School in Bagamoyo, completing her Ordinary Level education there in 1984. She took short courses in secretarial studies at Baptist College in Magomeni Ward.

Mirambo began work as a procurement clerk at Tanzania Shoes in 1984. She moved to Ubungo Textile Mills from 1987 to 1990, before opening her own small clothing shop in Magomeni. She managed the shop until 2008, selling kangas, kitenges, and cosmetics.

She became active in football in the 1980s and 1990s. She was selected for the Twiga Stars, playing for several sides including Coastal Union F.C. and African Sports during regional tours. She joined Sayari Women's F.C., eventually becoming team manager. In 2019, she became manager of Yanga Princess. By 2025, she served as secretary of the Association of Retired Women Footballers.

== Political career ==
In the early 1990s, as Tanzania opened to multi-party politics, Mirambo often attended Civic United Front rallies. She entered politics in 2010, when the Union for Multiparty Democracy (UMD) women's wing invited her to contest the councillorship election in Mzimuni ward. When political parties were asked to submit delegates for the Constitutional Assembly of 2014/15, she campaigned for women's inclusion. She was selected as a delegate herself by the UMD.

Mirambo unsuccessfully contested the parliamentary seat for Kinondoni District in the 2015 general election and the 2017 by-election. She ran again in the 2020 general election for Ubungo constituency and was again defeated.

=== 2025 presidential campaign ===
On 11 August 2025, Mirambo and her running mate Mashavu Alawi collected their nomination forms from the Independent National Electoral Commission (INEC) in order to run for the 2025 general election. She was cleared to run for election by the INEC on 27 August. She declared the beginning of her campaign on the weekend of 6–7 September in Muheza.

On 1 November 2025, the results of the election were declared by the INEC. Mirambo received 13,814 (0.04%) votes.

== Political positions ==
In her 2025 presidential campaign, Mirambo focused on healthcare, advocating for better-equipped hospitals and improved working conditions for medical staff. She pledged free health services for women giving birth, with the goal of reducing maternal and infant mortality rates. She stated that her party would also aim to reform education to provide more equitable access.

She promised reforms benefiting Tanzania's citrus and livestock industries and the modernisation of its agricultural sector.

She supports UMD's platform of federalisation.

== Personal life ==
She married Omar Farijala Hemed in 1994.
