= Hasifah Nassuna =

Ugandan footballer (born 1998)

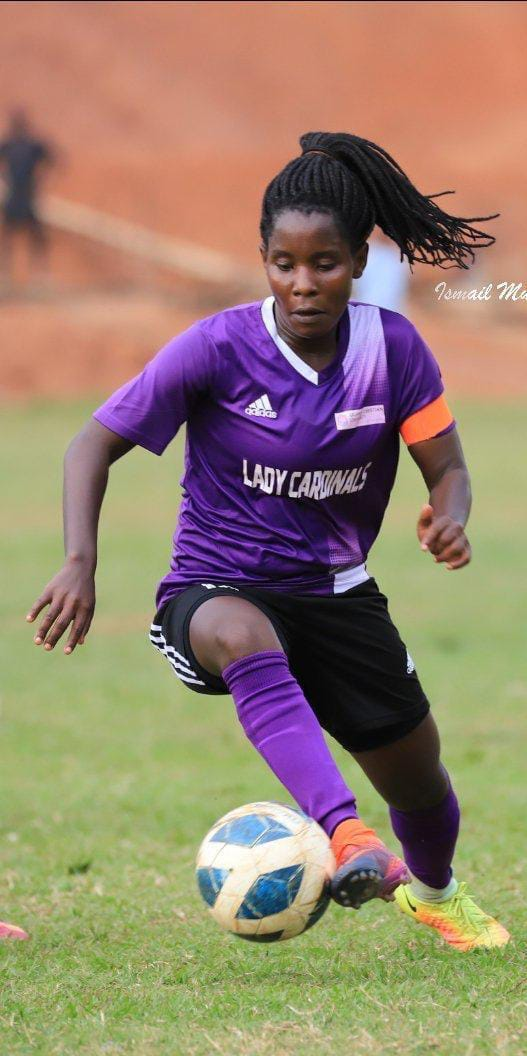
- Hasifah Nassuna

Personal information
- Birth name: Hasifah Nassuna
- Date of birth: 16 February 1998 (age 28)
- Place of birth: Mityana, Uganda
- Height: 1.57 m (5 ft 2 in)
- Positions: Centre attacking midfielder; right winger

Team information
- Current team: Kampala Queens

Senior career*
Years	Team	Apps	(Gls)
2015-2018	Kawempe Muslim Ladies FC	41	(57)
2018-2019	UCU Lady Cardinals	27	(26)
2019- present	Kampala Queens	32	(16)

International career^{‡}
2014-2016	Uganda Women U20	2	(4)
2016– present	Uganda	18	(12)
- * Club domestic league appearances and goals ‡ National team caps and goals as of 5 October 2021.

Hasifah Nassuna (born 16 February 1998) is a Ugandan footballer who plays as an attacking midfielder or Right winger for FUFA Women Super League club Kampala Queens and the Uganda women's national team., Nassuna is one of the 10 young ladies that at Kampala Queens parted ways with earlier this year.

== Early life ==
Nassuna was born in Mityana and raised in the Central Region. Her mother is Annet Nakimbugwe.

== Club career ==
Nassuna has played for Kawempe Muslim Ladies FC and joined UCU Lady Cardinals in Uganda.

== International career ==
Nassuna capped for Uganda Women U20 and Uganda at senior level during the 2021 COSAFA Women's Championship.

=== International goals ===
Scores and results list Uganda goal tally first

No.	Date	Venue	Opponent	Score	Result	Competition
1	12 September 2018	Wolfson Stadium, KwaZakele, South Africa	Eswatini	1–0	4–3	2018 COSAFA Women's Championship
2	12 September 2018	Wolfson Stadium, KwaZakele, South Africa	Eswatini	4–2	4–3	2018 COSAFA Women's Championship
3	3 April 2019	Addis Ababa Stadium, Addis Ababa, Ethiopia	Ethiopia	2–3	2–3	2020 CAF Women's Olympic Qualifying Tournament
4	17 November 2019	Chamazi Stadium, Mbagala, Tanzania	Djibouti	3–0	13–0	2019 CECAFA Women's Championship
5	17 November 2019	Chamazi Stadium, Mbagala, Tanzania	Djibouti	5–0	13–0	2019 CECAFA Women's Championship
6	17 November 2019	Chamazi Stadium, Mbagala, Tanzania	Djibouti	1?–0	13–0	2019 CECAFA Women's Championship
7	3 October 2021	Gelvandale Stadium, Port Elizabeth, South Africa	Eswatini	4–1	5–1	2021 COSAFA Women's Championship
8	3 October 2021	Gelvandale Stadium, Port Elizabeth, South Africa	Eswatini	5–1	5–1	2021 COSAFA Women's Championship

== Honours ==
=== Individual ===
- 2023 Uganda’s most decorated female footballer
- 2022 The first female player to score 100 league goals in the FUFA women’s super league
- 2022 Top Scorer in the 2021-22 FUFA Women Super League
- 2020 Ranked, Top 4 Influential Ugandan Sportswomen
- 2020 All Time National Team Top Goalscorer
- 2019 All Time Ugandan Women's Premier League Top Goalscorer
- Player With the Most Hatricks in the Ugandan Women's Premier League
- 2019 Ugandan Women's Premier League Top Goalscorer and Most Valuable Player
- 2018 Uganda Women's National Team Woman of the Match Award COSAFA Tournament
- 2017 Uganda Sports Press Association (USPA) Award
- 2017 Buzzy Teeniez Sports Personality
- Golden Boot Award CECAFA Top Goalscorer with 6 Goals
- 2017 Ugandan Women's Premier League Top Goalscorer with 26 Goals scored
- 2016 Ugandan Women's Premier League Most Valuable Player Award
- 2015 Nominated Airtel FUFA Female Player of the Year Award
- 2016 Won Airtel FUFA Female Player of the Year Award
- 2017 Nominated Airtel FUFA Female Player of the Year Award
- 2018 Nominated Airtel FUFA Female Player of the Year Award
- 2019 Nominated Airtel FUFA Female Player of the Year Award
