= Sandrinha =

Angolan footballer

Personal information
- Full name: Sandrina Buenatelue António
- Date of birth: 5 October 1997 (age 29)
- Position: Goalkeeper

Team information
- Current team: Sagrada Esperança

Senior career*
Years	Team	Apps	(Gls)
- Sagrada Esperança

International career^{‡}
2021–	Angola	4	(0)
- * Club domestic league appearances and goals ‡ National team caps and goals as of 4 October 2021.

Sandrina Buenatelue António (born 5 October 1997), known as Sandrinha, is an Angolan footballer who plays as a goalkeeper for GD Sagrada Esperança and the Angola women's national team.

== Club career ==
Sandrinha has played for Sagrada Esperança in Angola.

== International career ==
Sandrinha capped for Angola at senior level during the 2021 COSAFA Women's Championship.
