= 2021 COSAFA Women's Championship =

Tournament details
- Host country: South Africa
- Dates: 28 September—9 October 2021
- Teams: 12 (from 1 confederation)
- Venues: 2 (in 1 host city)

Final positions
- Champions: Tanzania (1st title)
- Runners-up: Malawi
- Third place: Zambia
- Fourth place: South Africa

Tournament statistics
- Matches played: 22
- Goals scored: 65 (2.95 per match)
- Top scorer(s): (South Africa) Sibulele Holweni (5 goals)
- Fair play award: Zambia

The 2021 COSAFA Women's Championship was the 9th edition of the COSAFA Women's Championship, a women's international football tournament for national teams organised by COSAFA, teams from Southern Africa. It will take place from 28 September to 9 October 2021 in the Nelson Mandela Bay Metropolitan Municipality, South Africa.

South Africa are the defending champion by having defeated Botswana 1–2 goals on 14 November 2020. They were beaten by Malawi in the semi-finals 3–2.

== Participants ==
Nine of the fourteen COSAFA member took take part in the competition. South Sudan and Tanzania from the CECAFA region entered as guests. Comoros withdrew and were replaced by guests Uganda from the CECAFA region. The draw was held on 12 August 2021.

- Angola
- Botswana
- Eswatini
- Malawi
- Mozambique
- Namibia
- South Africa
- South Sudan (guest)
- Tanzania (guest)
- Uganda (guest)
- Zambia
- Zimbabwe

=== Did not enter ===
- Comoros
- Lesotho
- Madagascar
- Mauritius
- Seychelles

== Venue ==
Matches will be held at the Nelson Mandela Bay Stadium and Wolfson Stadium in Port Elizabeth, South Africa.

Port Elizabeth	Port Elizabeth is located in South Africa	Port Elizabeth
Gelvandale Stadium	Port Elizabeth is located in South Africa	Wolfson Stadium
Capacity: 3,000	Port Elizabeth is located in South Africa	Capacity: 10,000

== Officials ==
Referees

- (Zimbabwe) Chipo Mayimbo Mercy
- (Malawi) Mercy Kayria
- (Namibia) Antsino Twanyanyukwa

Assistant Referees

- (Malawi) Hapinnes Mbandambanda
- (Zimbabwe) Claris Simango
- (Zimbabwe) Faith Mloyi
- (South Africa) Maneo Tau
- (Mozambique) Olinda Couana
- (Zambia) Mercy Zulu

== Group stage ==
The group stage is composed of three groups of four teams each. Group winners and the best runner-up amongst all groups advance to the semi-finals.

All times are South African Standard Time (UTC+2).

Tie-breaking criteria for group play
The ranking of teams in each group was based on the following criteria:
1. Number of points obtained in games between the teams involved
2. Goal difference in games between the teams involved
3. Goals scored in games between the teams involved
4. Away goals scored in games between the teams involved
5. Goal difference in all games
6. Goals scored in all games
7. Drawing of lots

Key to colour in group tables
The top finisher in each group and best runner-up qualified for the Knocokout-stage

=== Group A ===
Pos	Team	Pld	W	D	L	GF	GA	GD	Pts	Qualification
1	South Africa (H)	3	2	1	0	5	2	+3	7	Advance to Knockout stage
2	Malawi	3	2	0	1	6	4	+2	6	Advance to Knockout stage
3	Angola	3	0	2	1	2	4	−2	2	
4	Mozambique	3	0	1	2	5	8	−3	1	

Source: Soccerway
(H) Hosts
28 September 2021
12:00

Angola	2–2	Mozambique
Ngonguinha 40'; Yara 83'	Report	Goia 22'; Ninika 78'

Wolfson Stadium, Port Elizabeth
28 September 2021
15:30

South Africa	2–1	Malawi
Kgadiete 3'; Cesane 37'	Report	Mvula 90'

Wolfson Stadium, Port Elizabeth

1 October 2021
12:00

Malawi	3–2	Mozambique
Kapanda 21'; Thom 32'; Khumalo 57'	Report	Cina 12'; Ninika 13'

Gelvandale Stadium, Port Elizabeth
1 October 2021
15:30

South Africa	0–0	Angola
	Report

Gelvandale Stadium, Port Elizabeth

4 October 2021
15:30

South Africa	3–1	Mozambique
Holweni 24', 77'; Kgadiete 66'	Report	Cina 64'

Wolfson Stadium, Port Elizabeth
4 October 2021
15:30

Angola	0–2	Malawi
	Report	Chikupila 69'; Ngulube 81'

Gelvandale Stadium, Port Elizabeth

=== Group B ===
Pos	Team	Pld	W	D	L	GF	GA	GD	Pts	Qualification
1	Tanzania	3	3	0	0	8	0	+8	9	Advance to Knockout stage
2	Zimbabwe	3	2	0	1	5	4	+1	6	
3	Botswana	3	1	0	2	7	5	+2	3	
4	South Sudan	3	0	0	3	1	12	−11	0	

Source: Soccerway
29 September 2021
12:00

Botswana	7–0	South Sudan
Tholakele 9', 30', 40'; Radiakanyo 15'; Thanda 24'; Johannes 39'; Montsho 87'	Report

Wolfson Stadium, Port Elizabeth
29 September 2021
15:30

Tanzania	3–0	Zimbabwe
Minja 42'; Shurua 51'; Masaka 90'	Report

Wolfson Stadium, Port Elizabeth

2 October 2021
12:00

Botswana	0–2	Tanzania
	Report	Minja 5'; Shurua 79'

Gelvandale Stadium, Port Elizabeth
Referee: Mercy Kayria (Malawi)
2 October 2021
15:30

South Sudan	1–2	Zimbabwe
Riek 77'	Report	Neshamba 12'; Nyaumwe 83'

Gelvandale Stadium, Port Elizabeth

4 October 2021
12:00

Botswana	0–3	Zimbabwe
	Report	Mupeti 42'; Msipa 65'; Neshamba 83'

Wolfson Stadium, Port Elizabeth
4 October 2021
12:00

Tanzania	3–0	South Sudan
S. Athuman 52', 80', 90+1'	Report

Gelvandale Stadium, Port Elizabeth
Referee: Chipo Mayimbo Mercy (Zimbabwe)

=== Group C ===
Pos	Team	Pld	W	D	L	GF	GA	GD	Pts	Qualification
1	Zambia	3	3	0	0	9	0	+9	9	Advance to Knockout stage
2	Uganda	3	1	1	1	5	2	+3	4	
3	Namibia	3	1	1	1	1	3	−2	4	
4	Eswatini	3	0	0	3	1	11	−10	0	

Source: Soccerway
30 September 2021
12:00

Namibia	0–0	Uganda
	Report

Wolfson Stadium, Port Elizabeth
30 September 2021
15:30

Zambia	5–0	Eswatini
Ochumba 24', 75', 77'; Belemu 58'; Mukwasa 81'	Report

Wolfson Stadium, Port Elizabeth

3 October 2021
12:00

Eswatini	1–5	Uganda
Nkambule 56'	Report	Nabirye 15'; Nabbosa 26'; Nabweteme 62'; Nassuna 75', 75'

Gelvandale Stadium, Port Elizabeth
3 October 2021
15:30

Zambia	3–0	Namibia
Belemu 45+1'; Chanda 66'; Wilombe 84'	Report

Gelvandale Stadium, Port Elizabeth

5 October 2021
15:30

Zambia	1–0	Uganda
Chanda 37'	Report

Wolfson Stadium, Port Elizabeth
5 October 2021
15:30

Namibia	1–0	Eswatini
Mulunga 34'	Report

Gelvandale Stadium, Port Elizabeth

=== Ranking of runner-up teams ===
Pos	Grp	Team	Pld	W	D	L	GF	GA	GD	Pts	Qualification
1	A	Malawi	3	2	0	1	6	4	+2	6	Advance to Knockout stage
2	B	Zimbabwe	3	2	0	1	5	4	+1	6	
3	C	Uganda	3	1	1	1	5	2	+3	4	

Source: Soccerway

== Knockout stage ==
=== Bracket ===
- In the knockout stage, extra-time and a penalty shoot-out will be used to decide the winner if necessary.

Semi-finals
7 October—Port Elizabeth
Tanzania (p)	1 (3)
Zambia	1 (2)
7 October—Port Elizabeth
South Africa	2
Malawi	3

Final
9 October—Port Elizabeth
Tanzania	1
Malawi	0
Third Place match
9 October—Port Elizabeth
Zambia (p)	1 (4)
South Africa	1 (3)

=== Semi-finals ===
7 October 2021
12:00

Tanzania	1–1	Zambia
Mweemba 17' (o.g.)	Report	Chanda 69'
Penalties
Lunyamila (penalty scored); Ally (penalty missed); Suleimani (penalty scored); Sanga (penalty scored)	3–2	(penalty scored) Mupeso; (penalty missed) Belemu; (penalty scored) Musase; (penalty missed) Mweemba; (penalty missed) Ochumba

Wolfson Stadium, Port Elizabeth
7 October 2021
15:30

South Africa	2–3	Malawi
Holweni 45', 81' (pen.)	Report	Chiyembekezo 38'; Thom 74', 86'

Wolfson Stadium, Port Elizabeth

=== Third place match ===
9 October 2021
12:00

Zambia	1–1	South Africa
Ochumba 20'	Report	Holweni 76'
Penalties
Mweemba (penalty scored); Lampi (penalty missed); Mukwasa (penalty scored); Ochumba (penalty scored); Limwanya (penalty scored)	4–3	(penalty scored) van Wyk; (penalty missed) Faya; (penalty scored) Salgado; (penalty scored) Mokwena; (penalty missed) Holweni

Wolfson Stadium, Port Elizabeth
Referee: Mercy Kayria (Malawi)

=== Final ===
9 October 2021
15:00

Tanzania	1–0	Malawi
Kasonga 64'	Report

Wolfson Stadium, Port Elizabeth
Referee: Antsino Twanyanyukwa (Namibia)

== Overall ranking ==
Rnk	Grp	Team	Pld	W	D	L	GF	GA	GD	Pts
1	B	Tanzania	5	4	1	0	10	1	+9	13
2	A	Malawi	5	3	0	2	9	7	+2	9
3	C	Zambia	5	3	2	0	11	2	+9	11
4	A	South Africa	5	2	2	1	8	6	+2	8
5	B	Zimbabwe	3	2	0	1	5	4	+1	6
6	C	Uganda	3	1	1	1	5	2	+3	4
7	C	Namibia	3	1	1	1	1	3	−2	4
8	B	Botswana	3	1	0	2	7	5	+2	3
9	A	Angola	3	0	2	1	2	4	−2	2
10	A	Mozambique	3	0	1	2	5	8	−3	1
11	C	Eswatini	3	0	0	3	1	11	−10	0
12	B	South Sudan	3	0	0	3	1	12	−11	0

== Statistics ==
=== Goalscorers ===
There were 65 goals scored in 22 matches, for an average of 2.95 goals per match.

5 goals

- (South Africa) Sibulele Holweni

3 goals

- (Botswana) Refilwe Tholakele
- (Malawi) Sabinah Thom
- (Tanzania) Stumai Athuman
- (Zambia) Grace Chanda
- (Zambia) Lubandji Ochumba

2 goals

- (Mozambique) Cina
- (Mozambique) Ninika
- (South Africa) Melinda Kgadiete
- (Tanzania) Donisia Minja
- (Tanzania) Mwanahamisi Shurua
- (Uganda) Hasifah Nassuna
- (Zambia) Margaret Belemu
- (Zimbabwe) Rudo Neshamba

1 goal

- (Angola) Ngonguinha
- (Angola) Yara
- (Botswana) Balotlhanyi Johannes
- (Botswana) Masego Montsho
- (Botswana) Lesego Radiakanyo
- (Botswana) Mokgabo Thanda
- (Eswatini) Celiwe Nkambule
- (Malawi) Vanessa Chikupila
- (Malawi) Fazila Chiyembekezo
- (Malawi) Zainab Kapanda
- (Malawi) Ireen Khumalo
- (Malawi) Wezzie Mvula
- (Malawi) Madyina Ngulube
- (Mozambique) Goia
- (Namibia) Lovisa Mulunga
- (South Africa) Noxolo Cesane
- (South Sudan) Chieng Riek
- (Tanzania) Enekia Kasonga
- (Tanzania) Aisha Masaka
- (Uganda) Riticia Nabbosa
- (Uganda) Joan Nabirye
- (Uganda) Sandra Nabweteme
- (Zambia) Esther Mukwasa
- (Zambia) Mary Wilombe
- (Zimbabwe) Emmaculate Msipa
- (Zimbabwe) Priviledge Mupeti
- (Zimbabwe) Marjory Nyaumwe
- (Zambia) Ochumba Oseke

1 own goal

- (Zambia) Lushomo Mweemba (against Tanzania)

=== Awards ===
The following awards were given at the conclusion of the tournament.

Player of the tournament	Best goalkeeper	Top scorer
(Tanzania) Amina Bilali	(Zambia) Petronela Musole	(Uganda) Sibulele Holweni
FIFA Fair Play Award
Zambia
