= Silver Strikers Ladies =

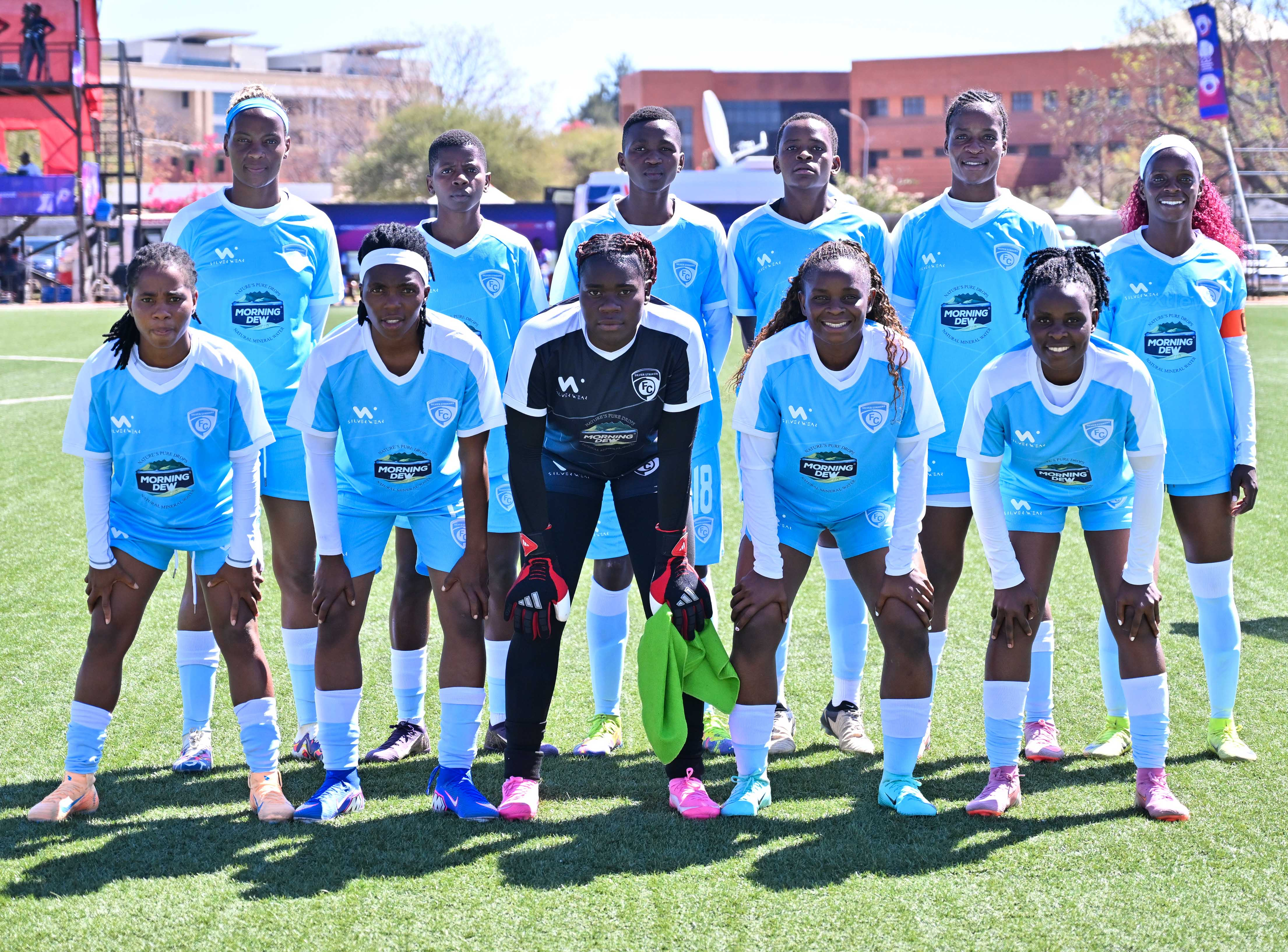
- The Silver Strikers starting XI in 2026
- Nickname: the Bankers
- Founded: 2023; 3 years ago under this name
- Coach: Andrew Chikhos

Silver Strikers Ladies is a leading Malawian women's football team. They took this name in 2023, having previously existed as DD Sunshine.

== History ==
The club was founded as DD Sunshine by David Dube. The former club produced two outstanding players, Tabitha and Temwa Chawinga, who became stars of football in Malawi and at foreign clubs. In 2014, Tabitha Chawinga began to pay for items like school uniforms and food for their young players, citing her passion for the game. When David Dude fell ill, she became a financial supporter. By 2020, while playing in China, she was paying to support three teams at DD Sunshine. It was a substantial donation, and Tabitha was keen to find a sponsor, including looking for one in China.

In 2023, the team became the Silver Strikers Ladies when they joined the Silver Strikers football club.

=== 2025–2026 achievements ===
The Silver Strikers Ladies won the 2025-26 NBM Women’s Premiership league. The players are well regarded, and Ireen Khumalo, Tionge Phiri, Madyina Nguluwe, Chikondi Gondwe, and Deborah Henry were part of the National team in 2026.

In August 2026, several of the Silver Strikers Ladies players were part of the national team which qualified for the World Cup. In the same month, the Silver Strikers Ladies left for Botswana to compete at the CAF Champions League COSAFA Qualifying Tournament, led by Adelaide Migogo of the Football Association of Malawi.

Later in August, the Silver Strikers were in Botswana where they were one of eight teams from Southern Africa competing in the CAF Women’s Champions League qualifier. The Silver Strikers beat Eswatini to make the semi-finals, even though they had lost to Mamelodi Sundowns Ladies.

== Players ==
=== Current squad (2026) ===
As of 25 August 2026

Note: Flags indicate national team as defined under FIFA eligibility rules; some limited exceptions apply. Players may hold more than one non-FIFA nationality.

No.	Pos.	Nation	Player
1	GK	MWI	Ireen Sibande
2	DF	MWI	Chikondi Dube
5	DF	MWI	Ireen Khumalo
6	FW	MWI	Yamikani Mhango
8	MF	MWI	Chikondi Gondwe
14	MF	MWI	Wezzie Mvula
15	DF	MWI	Tionge Phiri
18	MF	MWI	Linda Manda
19	FW	MWI	Grace Kakangula
20	DF	MWI	Ruth Nyirongo (c)
