= Adelaide Migogo =

Adelaide "Adela" Migogo became the President of the Malawian National Women's Football Association in 2023.

== Career ==
In 2020 she joined the Mighty Wanderers FC "Nomads" Executive Committee. She became the vice-General Secretary. She was unopposed in the election and she was the only women on the committee.

Migogo became the President of the Malawi's National Women's Football Association in 2023. She took over from Suzgo Ngwira Simbi. Tsalakunja Chimanga, Winnie Nyondo and Lustica Gondwe were vice-President, treasurer and General Secretary.

In 2026 Malawi's National Women's team were in Rabat in Morocco, making their debut at the Women's Africa Cup of Nations.

Migogo had left Morocco at the end of the group stage and before the team played in the final. Leaving FAM boss Felister Dossi to be credited as leading the Scorcher's delegation. This led to debate about whether Migogo had been given enough credit and whether she had been sent home. This was denied and it was said that this had all been pre-agreed. Malawi The National Council of Sports board chairperson Sunduzwayo Madise advised that her stay should have been extended following the team's success after the group stage. A commentator noted that the FAM Executive football committee in the country had ten members and eight of these were men who held all the senior positions.

Migogo praised the team after the final and noted that they had qualified for the World Cup. In the same month Migogo headed the FAM delegation to Botswana where the Silver Strikers Ladies were to compete at the CAF Champions League Cosafa Qualifying Tournament. She witnessed the Silver Strikers winning through to the semi-finals of the competition. This was the first time for a team from Malawi and Migogo saw this as evidence of the "rising quality" of women's football in Malawi. Carolyn Mathyola scored in the semi-final, but the match was won by ZESCO Ndola Girls F.C. with two goals.
