= Zainab Kapanda =

Malawian footballer

Personal information
- Date of birth: 12 March 2002 (age 24)
- Position: Midfielder

Team information
- Current team: Blantyre Zero

Senior career*
Years	Team	Apps	(Gls)
- Blantyre Zero
- Nyasa Big Bullets

International career^{‡}
2020–	Malawi	7	(2)
- * Club domestic league appearances and goals ‡ National team caps and goals as of 9 October 2021.

Zainab Kapanda (born 12 March 2002) is a Malawian footballer who played as a midfielder for Blantyre Zero and the Malawi women's national team. She transferred to Nyasa Big Bullets and she served as captain of the national team.

== Club career ==
Kapanda has played for Blantyre Zero in Malawi. In 2021 she scored two of the six goals as her team beat the Evirom team 6–0 in Blantyre.

== International career ==
Kapanda capped for Malawi at senior level during two COSAFA Women's Championship editions (2020 and 2021).

In February 2025 she was named by the team coach Lovemore Fazili as a midfielder for the national team to take part of a friendly match against Zambia which they won 3–2. In June she went with the team to Morocco and in December she and Benadetta Mkandawire were in the team during the victory of Malawi over the Lesotho national team. Kapanda was the captain of the team and they took a 3–0 victory in the Mpira stadium in Blantyre. The national team did not include several players who play abroad however there were five core team players besides Kapanda.
