= Milika Limwanya =

Zambian footballer (born 1996)

Personal information
- Date of birth: 8 January 1996 (age 30)
- Position: Defensive midfielder

Senior career*
Years	Team	Apps	(Gls)
- ZESCO United

International career^{‡}
2017	Zambia	1+	(0)
- * Club domestic league appearances and goals ‡ National team caps and goals as of 21 September 2017

Milika Limwanya (born 8 January 1996) is a Zambian footballer who plays as a defensive midfielder. She has been a member of the Zambia women's national team.

== Club career ==
Having been a product of Chiparamba Youth Soccer Academy, Limwanya has played for ZESCO United FC. She also played for Red Arrows women Football Team. She's one of the prospectshaving been identified through the Airtel Rising Stars which also brought to light the likes of Patson Daka, Enoch Mwepu and others.

== International career ==
Limwanya capped for Zambia at the 2017 COSAFA Women's Championship.
