= Chikondi Gondwe =

Malawian footballer

- challenged by Nthabeleng Potsane

Personal information
- Date of birth: 19 September 1998 (age 28)
- Position: Midfielder

Team information
- Current team: Silver Strikers Ladies

Senior career*
Years	Team	Apps	(Gls)
- CY Sisters

International career^{‡}
2020–	Malawi	3	(0)
Medal record
Women's Africa Cup of Nations
Silver medal – second place	2026 Morocco
- * Club domestic league appearances and goals ‡ National team caps and goals as of 9 October 2021.

Chikondi Gondwe (born 19 September 1998) is a Malawian footballer who has played as a midfielder for CY Sisters and then the Silver Strikers Ladies. She played for the Malawi women's national team when they qualified for the World Cup..

== Life ==
She and her twin sister, Mphatso, were born in 1998.

== Club career ==
Gondwe's father, Stereo Gondwe, became a football coach. She played for CY Sisters in Malawi. In 2021 she was one of the highest scorers in Northern Malawi having scored 23 goals and a contender for golden boot. The highest scorer was Chippo Ngwenya of Moyale Sisters who had 26.

In 2023 she was the captain of the CY Sisters.

== International career ==
She was capped for Malawi at senior level during two COSAFA Women's Championship editions (2020 and 2021).

Gondwe was playing for the Silver Strikers Ladies when in August 2026 she was included in the Lovemore Fazili's squad for the Women's Africa Cup of Nations in Rabat, but she was usually sitting on the bench. However she was called into the match when another player, Madyina Ngulube, was suspended and unavailable. Her performance was good on the 9 August, and she appeared to be prepared for the opportunity. She and the squad historically earned a place for the Malawian team in the 2027 World Cup. Malawi has never competed before at that level. Malawi joined Algeria, Morocco and Cameroon to qualify for the 2027 Women's World Cup in Brazil. In the semi final they beat Algeria to qualify for the 2026 Women’s Africa Cup of Nations (Wafcon) final. Gondwe and Asimenye Simwaka were replaced by Vanessa Chikupila and Leticia Chinyamula after each side was down to ten players. Malawi won the match 3-1.
