= Esther Mukwasa =

Zambian footballer (born 1996)

Personal information
- Date of birth: 24 October 1996 (age 30)
- Position: Midfielder

Senior career*
Years	Team	Apps	(Gls)
- Moba Queens

International career^{‡}
- Zambia
- * Club domestic league appearances and goals ‡ National team caps and goals as of 11 october 2014 (before the 2014 African Women's Championship)

Esther Mukwasa (born 24 October 1996) is a Zambian footballer who plays as a midfielder for the Zambia women's national football team. She was part of the team at the 2014 African Women's Championship. On club level she played for Moba Queens in Zambia.
