= Winfrida Gerald =

Tanzanian footballer

Personal information
- Full name: Winfrida Hubert Gerald
- Date of birth: 26 February 2008 (age 18)
- Place of birth: Morogoro, Tanzania
- Position: Midfielder

Team information
- Current team: JKT Queens

Senior career*
Years	Team	Apps	(Gls)
–2022	Fountain Gate Princess		
2023–	JKT Queens		

International career
2023–	Tanzania U18		
- * Club domestic league appearances and goals

Winfrida Hubert Gerald (born 26 February 2008) is a Tanzanian footballer playing as a midfielder or a forward for Tanzanian club JKT Queens and the Tanzania national team.

== Early career ==
Gerald started the football career at the Fountain Gate School based in Dodoma Region, a private institutions that runs specialized schools, including football for girls.

When she was at Fountain Gate she won the CAF African Schools Football Championship in South Africa, held in April 2023; she was the top scorer in the competition.

== International career ==
Gerald started playing for the Tanzania national under-18 team in 2023, with whom she participated in the CECAFA U-18 Women's Championship. She was voted best player of the tournament.

== International goals ==
No.	Date	Venue	Opponent	Score	Result	Competition
1.	28 February 2026	Al Hamriya Sports Club Stadium, Al Hamriyah, United Arab Emirates	Russia	1–4	1–4	2026 Pink Ladies Cup

== Honours ==
Fountain Gate

- CAF African Schools Football Championship: 2022
