= Tanzanian Women's Premier League =

Tanzania W-Premier League
- Founded: 2016; 10 years ago
- Country: Tanzania
- Confederation: CAF
- Number of clubs: 10
- Relegation to: Second Division
- Domestic cup: Tanzania Woman's Community Shield
- International cup: CAF W-Champions League
- Current champions: Simba Queens (5th title) (2025-2026)
- Most championships: Simba Queens (5 titles)
- Current: 2025–26 W-Premier League

The Tanzanian Women's Premier League called Tanzania Women's Premier League or Ligi Kuu Ya Wanawake Tanzania is the top flight of women's association football in Tanzania. The competition is run by the Tanzania Football Federation.

== History ==
The first Tanzanian women's league was contested in 2016-17 season. The winner of the first edition was Mlandizi Queens.

== Champions ==
The list of champions and runners-up:

Year	Champions	Runners-up
2016–17	Mlandizi Queens	JKT Queens
2017–18	JKT Queens	Kigoma Sisterz FC
2018–19	JKT Queens	Alliance Girls
2019–20	Simba Queens	JKT Queens
2020–21	Simba Queens	Yanga Princess
2021–22	Simba Queens	Fountain Gate Princess
2022–23	JKT Queens	Simba Queens
2023-24	Simba Queens	JKT Queens
2024-25	JKT Queens	Simba Queens

== Most successful clubs ==
Rank	Club	Champions	Runners-up	Winning seasons	Runners-up seasons
1	Simba Queens	4	2	2020, 2021, 2022, 2024	2023,2025
2	JKT Queens	4	2	2018, 2019, 2023,2025	2017, 2020
3	Mlandizi Queens	1	0	2017	
4	Kigoma Sisterz FC	0	1		2018
4	Alliance Girls	0	1		2019
4	Yanga Princess	0	1		2021
4	Fountain Gate Princess	0	1		2022
