= Madyina Ngulube =

Malawian footballer

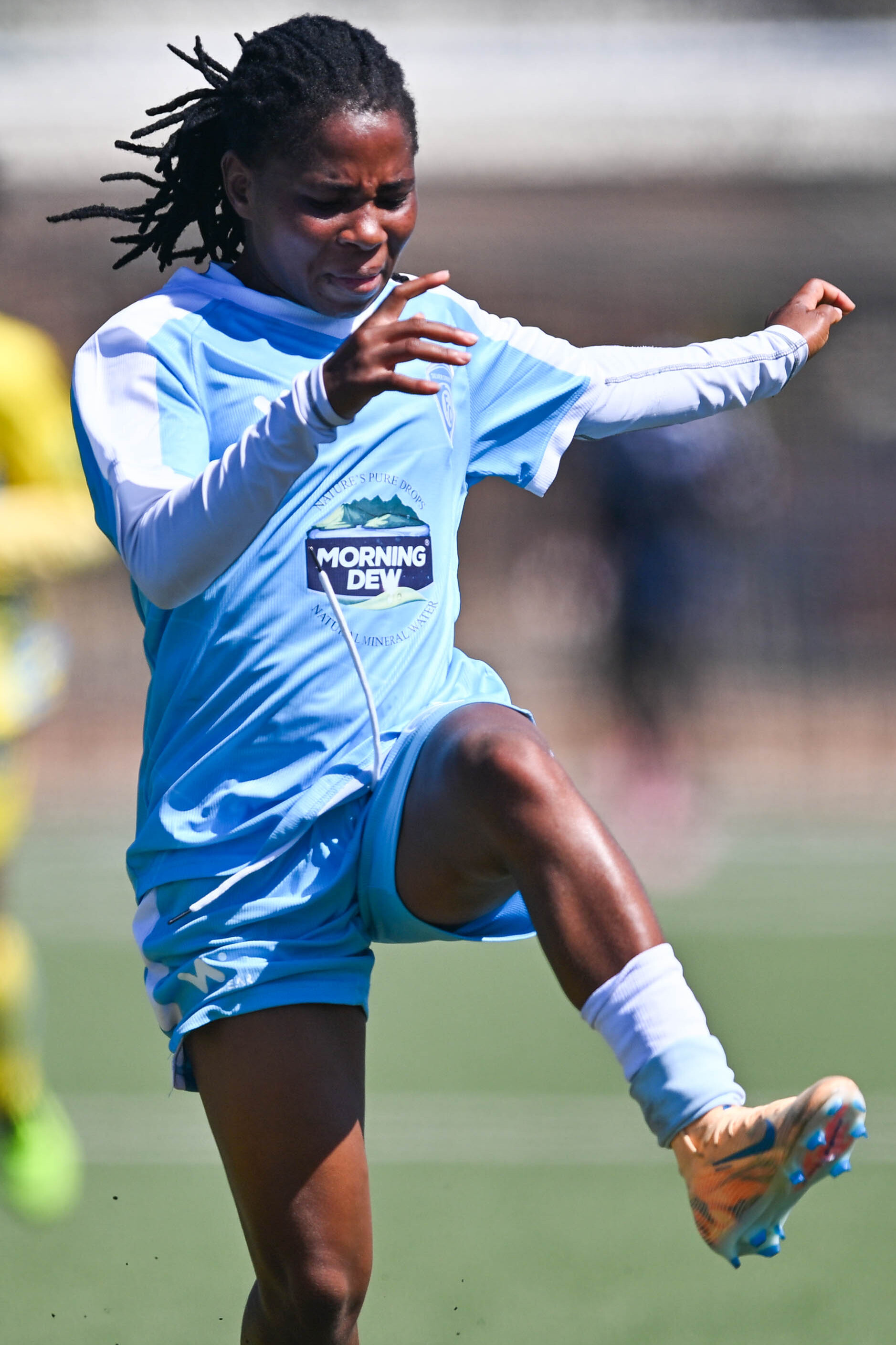
- 21 August 2026

Personal information
- Nickname: The Russian Tank
- Other names: Madyina Nguluwe
- National team: Malawi

Sport
- Country: Malawi (football); Zambia (football)
- Sport: Football
- Position: Midfielder
- Club: Elite Ladies FC; Silver Strikers FC

Madyina Ngulube is a Malawian professional footballer who plays as a midfielder for Elite Ladies FC, the Silver Strikers FC Ladies and the Malawi women's national football team, known as the Scorchers. Ngulube has been nicknamed "the Russian Tank" because of her height and physique.

== Club career ==
In 2023, Ngulube started playing for a Zambian club, Elite Ladies FC, a Lusaka-based football club playing in the FAZ Women Super Division League. Ngulube was nicknamed "the Russian Tank" in Zambia, because of her height and physique, which give her an edge over opposition defenders.

Ngulube was regarded as one of the strongest players in her later club, the Silver Strikers Ladies.

== International career ==
In 2021, Ngulube served as a temporary captain for the Scorchers during their first Cosafa Women's Championship final at Nelson Mandela Bay Stadium in South Africa.

In 2024, Ngulube served as vice captain of the Scorchers, and gave thank-you remarks during a luncheon at the Malawi State House when former President Lazarus Chakwera allocated all the Scorchers' players and officials residential plots in Area 45, Lilongwe. Ngulube said it was a dream come true to receive a plot and that this would motivate the players to keep making the nation proud.

The Scorchers appeared at the Women's Africa Cup of Nations in 2026 for the first time. They were ranked 153rd and were the rank outsiders; they continued to win, taking down Nigeria who were a favourite. The team's performance at WAFCON was described as the most "remarkable by an international team in a major tournament ever".

Ngulube played in the international tournament and was suspended after picking up two yellow cards. Ngulube was replaced by Chikondi Gondwe in the Scorchers' quarterfinal game against Ghana. Malawi won the match 2–1, thereby qualifying for the WAFCON semifinals and the FIFA Women's World Cup of 2027. The team lost Women's Africa Cup of Nations final against Cameroon, but their supporters included Adelaide Migogo, president of the Malawi's National Women's Football Association. Migogo sang their praises and noted that the team had qualified for the World Cup. Malawi's First Lady, Gertrude Mutharika, hosted a luncheon for the returning team at the Kamuzu Presidential Palace on 20 August 2026. It was announced that each player was to receive 5 million kwacha from the President.

== See also ==
- Football Association of Malawi
- List of football clubs in Malawi
- National Women’s Football Association (NWFA) of Malawi
