= Benadetta Mkandawire =

Malawian footballer (born 1992)

Bernadette Mkandawire
Personal information
- Date of birth: 28 September 2003 (age 23)
- Position: Right-back

International career
Years	Team	Apps	(Gls)
2022–	Malawi		
Medal record
Women's Africa Cup of Nations
Silver medal – second place	2026 Morocco

Bernadette Mkandawire (born 28 September 2003) is a Malawian footballer who played as a right-back for Nyasa Big Bullets, in Kazakhstan, Zambia and for the Malawi national team.

== Life ==
Mkandawire had played for Blantyre Zero. In 2022 she was one of five players chosen from the Nyasa Big Bullets team to represent Malawi at the COSAFA Women's Championship by the new coach Lovemore Fazili. It was her first time at this championship. The others were Mary Chavinda, Vanessa Chikupira, Emily Jossam and the goalkeeper Martha Banda.

At the end of 2024 she and Vanessa Chikupira signed to play for the women's top-tier football league club BIIK Kazygurt in Kazakhstan. She left as captain of team after leaving the Bullets at the top of the league after winning sixteen league matches consecutively.

In February 2025, she joined other Malawian players picked to play Zambia. She was one of seven players based abroad who were included in Lovemore Fazili's squad, although she was in Zambia. Chimwemwe Madise and Sabina Thom were in the DRC and Tabitha Chawinga and Rose Kabzere were in France. Vanessa Chikupira was also in Zambia and Temwa Chawinga joined them from America. There were two games in Zambia and Malawi lost the first and won the second with a 3:2 victory. The National team takes pride in the number of its players who play abroad, because they don't play many international competitions so its good to see that their players are noticed.

In June 2026 she was one of four Nyasa Big Bullets players chosen for the 32 string list of contenders for the national team. In the following month the final list of 23 women only included one Nyasa Big Bullets player and that was Mkandawire. These 23 would compete in Morocco for the 2026 CAF Women's Africa Cup of Nations (WAFCON).
