= Chisomo Kazisonga =

Malawian football player

Chisomo Kazisonga-Sauseng
- Born: 10 February 1985 (age 41)
- Citizenship: Malawian
- Occupation: Footballer

Chisomo Kazisonga-Sauseng (born 10 February 1985) is a Malawian footballer who plays as a defender and midfielder for 1. FC Leibnitz.

== Early life ==
At the age of eighteen, Kazisonga started her career with Malawian side DD Sunshine and debuted for the Malawi women's national football team. Thereafter, she received media attention for her leadership ability.

== College career ==
Kazisonga studied sports science at a university in Austria.

== Club career ==
Besides Malawi, Kazisonga has played in Zimbabwe and Austria. In 2013, she signed for the Zimbabwean side Conduit Soccer Academy on a two-year contract, and was made captain of the club. In 2015, she signed for Austrian side SV Neulengbach, becoming the second Malawian women's footballer to ever play in Europe. Besides playing for the club's first team, she played for the reserve team.

== International career ==
Kazisonga has represented the Malawi women's national football team internationally, including during the 2017 COSAFA Women's Championship. She has been captain of the Malawi women's national football team.

== Style of play ==
Kazisonga mainly operates as a midfielder and defender and can operate as a central defender, the position she played while playing for the reserve team of SV Neulengbach. She is also known for her in-game decision-making ability.

== Personal life ==
Kazisonga is married.
