= Vanessa Chikupira =

Malawian footballer

Personal information
- Full name: Vanessa Mbinho Chikupila
- Date of birth: 2 April 1996 (age 30)
- Position: Forward

Team information
- Current team: Gokulam Kerala

Senior career*
Years	Team	Apps	(Gls)
- Blantyre Zero
–2023	FCB Nyasa Big Bullets		
2023–2024	Green Buffaloes		
2024–2025	Biik-Kazygurt		
2025–2026	Palm Hills		
2026–	Gokulam Kerala		

International career^{‡}
2020–	Malawi		(1)
Medal record
Women's Africa Cup of Nations
Silver medal – second place	2026 Morocco
- * Club domestic league appearances and goals ‡ National team caps and goals as of 9 October 2021.

Vanessa Mbinho Chikupila (sometimes spelled Chikupira; born 2 April 1996) is a Malawian footballer who plays as a forward for the Indian Women's League club Gokulam Kerala. She also played for the Green Buffaloes team in Zambia and the Biik-Kazygurt club in Kazakhstan. She represents the Malawi women's national team.

== Club career ==
Chikupira has played for Blantyre Zero in Malawi.

On 2023 she was the leading goalscorer for FCB Nyasa Big Bullets. At the end of the year she signed for the Green Buffaloes team in Zambia.

After a year in Zambia she moved to the Biik-Kazygurt club in Kazakhstan women's top football league. She was accompanied by Bernadette Mkandawire who also joined the same club.

== International career ==
Chikupira capped for Malawi at senior level during two COSAFA Women's Championship editions (2020 and 2021). She was chosen again for the 2022 Championships. She was one of five Nyasa Bullets players chosen the others were rookie Bernadette Mkandawire, Emily Jossam, Mary Chavinda and goalkeeper Martha Banda.

She was one of the players who obtained a hat trick on a 17-0 friendly against the team from the Seychelles in September 2023.

In February 2025 she flew back to Africa to join other players picked to play Zambia. She was one of seven players based abroad who were included in Lovemore Fazili's Zambia squad. Chimwemwe Madise and Sabina Thom are contracted to play in the Democratic Republic of Congo; Tabitha Chawinga and Rose Kabzere are in France. Bernadette Mkandawire was with Chikupira in Zambia and Temwa Chawinga joined them from America.

She was in Lovemore Fazili's squad who went to Morocco in August 2026. They beat Algeria to qualify for the 2026 Women's Africa Cup of Nations (Wafcon) final. She came on as a substitute with Leticia Chinyamula to replace Asimenye Simwaka and Chikondi Gondwe. By that point both sides were down to ten players but Malawi won the match 3–1.
