= Koketso Tlailane =

South African soccer player

Personal information
- Full name: Koketso Mmathabo Mary Tlailane
- Date of birth: 7 December 1992 (age 33)
- Position: Defender

Team information
- Current team: Ramatlaohle
- Number: 7

Senior career*
Years	Team	Apps	(Gls)
–	TUT Ladies		
2024–	Ramatlaohle		

International career^{‡}
2018–	South Africa	2	(0)
- * Club domestic league appearances and goals ‡ National team caps and goals as of 16 June 2019

Koketso Mmathabo Mary Tlailane (born 7 December 1992) is a South African soccer player who plays as a defender for Ramatlaohle and the South Africa women's national team.

== International career ==
Tlailane appeared in two matches for the South Africa women's national soccer team in 2019. She was in the South Africa squad at the 2018 Africa Women Cup of Nations but did not appear in any matches.
