= Chimwemwe Madise =

Malawian footballer (born 1992)

Personal information
- Date of birth: 6 April 1992 (age 34)
- Place of birth: Malawi
- Position: Midfielder

Team information
- Current team: TP Mazembe
- Number: 4

International career
Years	Team	Apps	(Gls)
2020–	Malawi	17	(0)
Medal record
Women's Africa Cup of Nations
Silver medal – second place	2026 Morocco

Chimwemwe Madise (born 6 April 1992) is a Malawian footballer. She played for TP Mazembe in the Democratic Republic of the Congo and the Malawi women's national football team.

== Life ==
Madise was born in 1992.

In 2015, she was a defender for the Malawian National team and DD Sunshine in Blantyre.

Madise was chosen for the Cosafa Women's Championship in September 2021 in South Africa and she and Patricia Nyirenda were the only players included who were not based in Malawi. She and Patricia Nyirenda had both committed to play in Lusaka in Zambia earlier that year.

Madise played in Lusaka for the Elite Ladies FC on a three-year contract. Her last game in Lusaka was in March 2024. She then signed for two years with TP Mazembe in 2024 where Sabina Thom was also playing in the DRC. and in that November when they won the CAF Women's Champions league.

In November 2024 she was playing for TP Mazembe when they won the CAF Women's Champions League.

In February 2025, she joined other Malawian players picked to play Zambia. She was one of seven players based abroad who were included in Lovemore Fazili's squad. She and Sabina Thom were both contracted to play in the Democratic Republic of Congo; Tabitha Chawinga and Rose Kabzere were in France. Bernadette Mkandawire was with Vanessa Chikupira in Zambia and Temwa Chawinga joined them from America. There were two games in Zambia and Malawi lost the first and won the second with a 3:2 victory.

In June the Malawi national squad were in Casablanca for a friendly match against Morocco. Both Madise and Temwa Chawinga had to send their apologies because of commitments to their clubs.

Madise was in the team that made the WAFCON final in 2026. They were defeated 3:0 by Cameroon who became the champions at their fourth time in the WAFCON final. As a result Malawi secured a place in the FIFA Women's World Cup; this will be the country's first appearance. Malawi joined Algeria, Morocco and Cameroon in qualifying for the 2027 games set to be played in Brazil.

The First Lady, Gertrude Mutharika, hosted a luncheon for the team at the Kamuzu Presidential Palace on 20 August. The First Lady announced that each player was to receive 5 million kwacha from the President.
