= Sabinah Thom =

Malawian footballer

Personal information
- Date of birth: 3 March 1996 (age 30)
- Position: Forward

Team information
- Current team: DD Sunshine

Senior career*
Years	Team	Apps	(Gls)
- DD Sunshine

International career^{‡}
2020–	Malawi	8	(3)
Medal record
Women's Africa Cup of Nations
Silver medal – second place	2026 Morocco
- * Club domestic league appearances and goals ‡ National team caps and goals as of 9 October 2021.

Sabinah Thom (born 3 March 1996) is a Malawian footballer who plays as a forward for TP Mazembe and the Malawi women's national football team, The Scorchers. Before joining the TP Mazembe, Sabinah played for KB Lionesses and the Tanzanian side Simba.

== Club career ==
Thom has played for DD Sunshine in Malawi Simba in Tanzanoa and the Kvarnsmederns team in Sweden. She went on to join TP Mazembe in the DRC.

== International career ==
Thom was capped for Malawi at senior level during two COSAFA Women's Championship editions (2020 and 2021).

In February 2025 she was in the DRC and she flew back to Malawi to join other players picked to play Zambia. She was one of seven players based abroad who were included in Lovemore Fazili's Zambia squad. Chimwemwe Madise who also made the team is also contracted to play in the Democratic Republic of Congo while Tabitha Chawinga and Rose Kabzere were in France. Bernadette Mkandawire was with Vanessa Chikupira in Zambia and Temwa Chawinga joined them from America. There were two games in Zambia and Malawi lost the first and won the second with a 3:2 victory with Thom scoring one of the goals.

In August 2026 she was in Morocco with the national team. She, Chimwemwe Madise, and Rose Kadzere were the defence against Zambia. The team made the final where they were defeated 3:0 by Cameroon who became the champions at their fourth time in the WAFCON final.

== International goals ==
No.	Date	Venue	Opponent	Score	Result	Competition
1.	1 October 2021	Gelvandale Stadium, Port Elizabeth, South Africa	Mozambique	2–2	3–2	2021 COSAFA Women's Championship
2.	7 October 2021	Wolfson Stadium, Port Elizabeth, South Africa	South Africa	2–1	3–2	2021 COSAFA Women's Championship
3.	7 October 2021	Wolfson Stadium, Port Elizabeth, South Africa	South Africa	3–2	3–2	2021 COSAFA Women's Championship
4.	20 October 2021	Bingu National Stadium, Lilongwe, Malawi	Zambia	1–1	1–1	2022 Women's Africa Cup of Nations qualification
5.	25 September 2023	Mpira Stadium, Blantyre, Malawi	Seychelles	3–0	17–0	Friendly
6.	25 September 2023	Mpira Stadium, Blantyre, Malawi	Seychelles	4–0	17–0	Friendly
7.	7 October 2023	Dobsonville Stadium, Johannesburg, South Africa	Eswatini	1–0	8–0	2023 COSAFA Women's Championship
8.	7 October 2023	Dobsonville Stadium, Johannesburg, South Africa	Eswatini	2–0	8–0	2023 COSAFA Women's Championship
9.	15 October 2023	Lucas Moripe Stadium, Pretoria, South Africa	Zambia	2–1	2–1	2023 COSAFA Women's Championship
10.	28 October 2024	Madibaz Stadium, Gqeberha, South Africa	Mauritius	2–0	9–0	2024 COSAFA Women's Championship
11.	28 October 2024	Madibaz Stadium, Gqeberha, South Africa	Mauritius	5–0	9–0	2024 COSAFA Women's Championship
12.	28 October 2024	Madibaz Stadium, Gqeberha, South Africa	Mauritius	7–0	9–0	2024 COSAFA Women's Championship
13.	25 February 2025	REIZ Stadium, Lusaka, Zambia	Zambia	3–1	3–2	Friendly
