= Mary Chavinda =

Malawian footballer b.c.1998

- Born: 1998 (age 27–28); Malawi
- Occupation: footballer
- Known for: scoring goals including for the Malawi women's national football team

Mary Chavinda (born c. 1998) is a Malawian footballer. She has played for the Nyasa Big Bullets women's team in Blantyre, in Rwanda and for the Malawi women's national football team.

== Life ==
Chavinda was born in Malawi in about 1998. She is from Euthini in Mzimba. Her first team was Envirom FC, in Blantyre, before she moved to Zomba Super Queens.

In 2016, Chavinda joined Nyasa Bullets - although at the time they were called Blantyre Zero.

She was chosen as a striker for Malawi at the 2020 COSAFA Women's Championship. In 2021 she scored 43 goals in the season and was awarded the golden boot.

On 2022 she returned to play in the COSAFA Women's Championship. She was one of five Nyasa Bullets players chosen in 2022, the others were rookie Bernadette Mkandawire, Emily Jossam, Vanessa Chikupira and goalkeeper Martha Banda. 2022 was a good year for her. At one point she had scored 25 goals on nine games making her the highest scorer for the club and in her league.

The long list of over 40 players for the 2023 COSAFA Women's Championship included Chavinda but she did not make the final cut of 23 players for the contest in South Africa. Three of her teammates are Benardetta Mkandawire, Lyna James and their best goal scorer Vanessa Chikupira. In 2024 Chavida had moved to Rwanda to play for Rayon Sports F.C. where she scored 13 goals. She was the player of the month in January.

She was in the 2024 COSAFA Women's Championship squad joining Sabina Thom and Vanessa Chikupila who played for teams in the DRC and Zambia. Other selected expatriate players, Rose Kabzere and the Chawinga sisters sent apologies.

In 2025 she returned from Rwanda's Rayon Sports Women to rejoin the Bullets on a one-year contract. She had not played for the National team while abroad.
