= Wezzie Mvula =

Malawian footballer

Personal information
- Date of birth: 6 July 1996 (age 30)
- Position: Midfielder

Team information
- Current team: Silver Strikers Ladies

International career
Years	Team	Apps	(Gls)
2020–	Malawi	11	(4)

Wezzie Mvula (born 6 July 1996) is a Malawian footballer who plays as a midfielder for the Silver Strikers Ladies and the Malawi women's national team.

== Life ==
In 2019 she was playing for DD Sunshine when she was chosen for the national team competing to qualify for the 2020 Olympic Games. DD Sunshine was taken over and changed its name to Silver Strikers Ladies.

Mvula was a member of the Silver Strikers Ladies when they became the first NBM champions in 2026.
