= JKT Queens =

Football club in Tanzania

- Full name: Jeshi la Kujenga Taifa Queens Soccer Club
- Ground: Major General Isamuhyo Stadium
- Capacity: 15,000
- Coordinates: 95Q8+9HH, Dar es Salaam
- Coach: Ali Ali
- League: Tanzanian Women's Premier League
- 2024–25: 1st
- Website: https://www.jkt.go.tz/

Jeshi la Kujenga Taifa Queens or simply JKT Queens is a Tanzanian professional women's football club based in Dar es Salaam, Tanzania. The club features in the Tanzanian Women's Premier League.

== Players ==
=== Current squad ===
As of 1 November 2023

Note: Flags indicate national team as defined under FIFA eligibility rules; some limited exceptions apply. Players may hold more than one non-FIFA nationality.

No.	Pos.	Nation	Player
1	GK	TAN	Zulfa Makau
2	DF	TAN	Anastazia Katunzi
3	DF	TAN	Ester Gindulya
4	MF	TAN	Amina Bilali
5	DF	TAN	Anastazia Nyandago
6	MF	TAN	Donisia Minja
7	MF	TAN	Winifrida Hubert
8	FW	TAN	Stumai Athumani
9	FW	TAN	Jamila Mnunduka
10	MF	TAN	Janeth Pangamwene
11	MF	TAN	Violeth Mwamakamba

No.	Pos.	Nation	Player
12	DF	TAN	Diana Mnally
13	MF	TAN	Kadosho Shekigenda
14	MF	TAN	Alia Salum
15	MF	TAN	Joyce Lema
16	MF	TAN	Eto Mlenzi
17	MF	TAN	Fatuma Makusanya
18	GK	TAN	Najiat Abass
19	DF	TAN	Happiness Mwaipaja
20	GK	TAN	Asha Mrisho
21	DF	TAN	Christer Bahera

== Honours ==
=== National titles ===
- Tanzanian Women's Premier League
  - Winners (4): 2018, 2019, 2023, 2025
  - Runners-up (3): 2017, 2020, 2024
