= Yanga Princess =

Football club in Tanzania

- Full name: Yanga Princess Soccer Club
- Owner: Young Africans S.C.
- League: Tanzanian Women's Premier League

Yanga Princess is a Tanzanian professional women's football club based in Jangwani, Dar es Salaam, Tanzania. The club features in the Tanzanian Women's Premier League. The club is affiliated to Young Africans SC who play in the Ligi Kuu Bara.
