= 2025 COSAFA Women's Championship squads =

The 2025 COSAFA Women's Championship is an upcoming international women's association football tournament set to be held in Polokwane, South Africa from 18 February to 1 March 2026. The 11 national teams involved in the tournament were required to register a squad of 23 players, including three goalkeepers. Only players in these squads were eligible to take part in the tournament.

The age listed for each player is on 18 February 2026, the first day of the tournament. The club listed is the club for which the player last played a competitive match prior to the tournament. A flag is included for coaches who are of a different nationality than their own national team.

== Group A ==
=== South Africa ===
Head coach: Desiree Ellis

No.	Pos.	Player	Date of birth (age)	Club
1	GK	Dineo Magagula	14 October 1994 (aged 31)	(South African Football Association) TS Galaxy Queens
2	DF	Asanda Hadebe	13 October 2003 (aged 22)	(South African Football Association) Mamelodi Sundowns
3	DF	Shakira O'Malley	3 January 2003 (aged 23)	(South African Football Association) UWC Ladies
4	MF	Regina Mogolola	17 April 1993 (aged 32)	(South African Football Association) JVW
5	DF	Unathi Simayile	8 February 2001 (aged 25)	(South African Football Association) UWC Ladies
6	MF	Bongiwe Thusi	20 July 1991 (aged 34)	(South African Football Association) JVW
7	DF	Lonathemba Mhlongo	23 August 2002 (aged 23)	(South African Football Association) UWC Ladies
8	MF	Thorisho Mphelo	4 April 2009 (aged 16)	(South African Football Association) JVW
9	MF	Gabriela Salgado	20 February 1998 (aged 27)	(South African Football Association) JVW
10	MF	Zoë October	16 June 2008 (aged 17)	(South African Football Association) Spurs
11	MF	Gugu Dhlamini	9 September 2005 (aged 20)	(South African Football Association) Mamelodi Sundowns
12	MF	Sibahle Maneli	18 March 2000 (aged 25)	(South African Football Association) TS Galaxy Queens
13	FW	Bonolo Mokoma	30 April 2008 (aged 17)	(South African Football Association) JVW
14	MF	Nonhlanhla Mthandi	19 August 1995 (aged 30)	(South African Football Association) Mamelodi Sundowns
15	MF	Khutso Pila	31 May 2000 (aged 25)	(South African Football Association) Mamelodi Sundowns
16	GK	Casey Gordon	3 December 2007 (aged 18)	(South African Football Association) JVW
17	MF	Isabella Ludwig	13 December 2002 (aged 23)	(South African Football Association) Mamelodi Sundowns
18	MF	Sibulele Holweni (Captain)	28 April 2001 (aged 24)	(South African Football Association) UWC Ladies
19	DF	Sinegugu Zondi	6 May 1999 (aged 26)	(South African Football Association) UWC Ladies
20	DF	Antonia Maponya	17 October 1999 (aged 26)	(South African Football Association) UWC Ladies
21	MF	Fiona Namanyana	2 December 2001 (aged 24)	(South African Football Association) Copperbelt Ladies
22	MF	Sibongakonke Mzobe	25 January 2005 (aged 21)	(South African Football Association) UJ
23	FW	Nthabiseng Majiya	10 June 2004 (aged 21)	(South African Football Association) Mamelodi Sundowns

=== Malawi ===
Head coach: Lovemore Fazili

Malawi announced their final 23-player squad on 15 February 2026.

No.	Pos.	Player	Date of birth (age)	Club
1	GK	Mercy Sikelo	22 December 1997 (aged 28)	(Football Association of Malawi) Kukoma Ntopwa
2	DF	Olivia Phikani	20 July 2006 (aged 19)	(Football Association of Malawi) Kukoma Ntopwa
3	DF	Doreen Dickson	22 February 2001 (aged 24)	(Football Association of Malawi) MDF Lioness
4	DF	Chimwemwe Madise (Captain)	6 April 1992 (aged 33)	(Congolese Association Football Federation) TP Mazembe
5	DF	Maureen Kenneth	28 October 2007 (aged 18)	(Football Association of Malawi) Ascent Soccer Academy
6	FW	Chikondi Gondwe	16 September 1998 (aged 27)	(Football Association of Malawi) Silver Strikers Ladies
7	FW	Mary Chavinda	27 December 1998 (aged 27)	(Football Association of Malawi) FCB Nyasa Big Bullets
8	MF	Tendai Sani	11 January 2004 (aged 22)	(Football Association of Zambia) ZISD
9	FW	Vitumbiko Mkandawire	17 December 2000 (aged 25)	(Football Association of Malawi) Civil Service
10	MF	Lyna James	23 November 1998 (aged 27)	(Football Association of Malawi) FCB Nyasa Big Bullets
11	FW	Deborah Henry	28 September 2004 (aged 21)	(Football Association of Malawi) Silver Strikers Ladies
12	MF	Sarah Mulimbika	11 January 2007 (aged 19)	(Football Association of Malawi) Kukoma Ntopwa
13	FW	Vanessa Chikupila	2 April 1996 (aged 29)	(Egyptian Football Association) Palm Hills
14	DF	Maggie Chavula	28 April 2005 (aged 20)	(Football Association of Malawi) Ascent Soccer Academy
15	MF	Leticia Chinyamula	12 June 2006 (aged 19)	(Football Association of Malawi) Ascent Soccer Academy
16	GK	Yamikani Kaonga	11 October 2004 (aged 21)	(Football Association of Malawi) MDF Lioness
17	MF	Madyina Nguluwe	18 June 1996 (aged 29)	(Football Association of Malawi) Silver Strikers Ladies
18	DF	Ireen Khumalo	12 December 2003 (aged 22)	(Football Association of Malawi) Silver Strikers Ladies
19	FW	Chisomo Banda	3 November 2003 (aged 22)	(Football Association of Zambia) Konkola Blades Queens
20	MF	Funny Magombo	5 April 2005 (aged 20)	(Football Association of Malawi) Kukoma Ntopwa
21	DF	Rose Alufandika	4 November 2005 (aged 20)	(Football Association of Malawi) Kukoma Ntopwa
22	DF	Benadetta Mkandawire	28 September 2003 (aged 22)	(Football Association of Malawi) FCB Nyasa Big Bullets
23	GK	Esther Maulidi	3 February 2008 (aged 18)	(Football Association of Malawi) Mighty Wanderers Queens
24	DF	Tionge Phiri	28 August 2000 (aged 25)	(Football Association of Malawi) Silver Strikers Ladies

=== Lesotho ===
Head coach: Shalane Lehohla

Lesotho announced their final 23-player squad on 16 February 2026.

No.	Pos.	Player	Date of birth (age)	Club
1	GK	Nthabiseng Hlao	6 March 2002 (aged 23)	(Lesotho Football Association) Lijabatho Ladies
2	DF	Mats'eliso Mosala	1 April 1997 (aged 28)	(Lesotho Football Association) Kick4Life
3	DF	Mpho Molefe	18 November 2005 (aged 20)	(Lesotho Football Association) Kick4Life
4	DF	Mats'eliso Makeke	10 October 2003 (aged 22)	(Lesotho Football Association) Lijabatho Ladies
5	DF	Limpho Nthako	25 November 2006 (aged 19)	(Lesotho Football Association) Berea Ladies
6	MF	Rapelang Makhetha	13 March 2005 (aged 20)	(Lesotho Football Association) Lijabatho Ladies
7	MF	Molemo Mokhothu	8 October 1998 (aged 27)	(Lesotho Football Association) Kick4Life
8	MF	Mamasoabi Monese	5 March 1999 (aged 26)	(Lesotho Football Association) LDF Ladies
9	MF	Mampona Lekenyane	22 August 2008 (aged 17)	(Lesotho Football Association) Berea Ladies
10	FW	Reitumetse Namane	22 August 2002 (aged 23)	(Lesotho Football Association) Kick4Life
11	FW	Lits'eoane Maloro (Captain)	13 May 1996 (aged 29)	(South African Football Association) UWC Ladies
12	FW	Makhotso Moalosi	4 July 2003 (aged 22)	(Lesotho Football Association) LDF Ladies
13	MF	Ntsoaki Nthethe	2 April 2003 (aged 22)	(Lesotho Football Association) Villa Ladies
14	DF	Nteboheleng Ramatsoku	22 May 2001 (aged 24)	(Lesotho Football Association) Lijabatho Ladies
15	FW	Phuzile Molefe	18 January 1997 (aged 29)	(Lesotho Football Association) Berea Ladies
16	GK	Boelo Lepheana	6 May 1997 (aged 28)	(Lesotho Football Association) Kick4Life
17	FW	Nthabeleng Potsane	29 October 1998 (aged 27)	(Lesotho Football Association) LDF Ladies
18	MF	Maseriti Mohlolo	22 April 1997 (aged 28)	(Lesotho Football Association) LDF Ladies
19	DF	Bokang Ntsane	20 July 2002 (aged 23)	(Lesotho Football Association) LDF Ladies
20	MF	Mpolokeng Liphamamo	31 July 2001 (aged 24)	(Lesotho Football Association) Kick4Life
21	MF	Lerato Tsoinyane	10 February 2004 (aged 22)	(Lesotho Football Association) Kick4Life
22	GK	Lineo Fanyane	23 January 1999 (aged 27)	(Lesotho Football Association) Setoko
23	DF	Liteboho Tjobe	13 October 2003 (aged 22)	(Lesotho Football Association) Berea Ladies

=== Angola ===
Head coach:

Angola announced their final 23-player squad on 13 February 2026.

No.	Pos.	Player	Date of birth (age)	Club
1	GK	Rita José "Rita"	20 March 1998 (aged 27)	(Angolan Football Federation) 4 de Julho
2	DF	Garça dos Santos "Naomi"	19 July 1997 (aged 28)	(Angolan Football Federation) 4 de Julho
3	DF	Manuela Simão "Nela"	4 April 2002 (aged 23)	(Angolan Football Federation) Petro de Luanda
4	DF	Emacleny Lando "Nelma"	27 December 2002 (aged 23)	(Angolan Football Federation) 4 de Julho
5	DF	Victória Fernando	14 September 2003 (aged 22)	(Angolan Football Federation) Petro de Luanda
6	MF	Sara Luvunga "Prado"	12 September 1999 (aged 26)	(Congolese Association Football Federation) TP Mazembe
7	FW	Cristina Makua "Cristina"	14 May 1995 (aged 30)	(Angolan Football Federation) 1° de Agosto
8	MF	Teresa Evaristo "Marizete"	24 April 1999 (aged 26)	(Angolan Football Federation) Petro de Luanda
9	FW	Domingas Luís "Mila"	5 May 2005 (aged 20)	(Angolan Football Federation) Petro de Luanda
10	DF	Paulina Sambo "Pauleta"	4 December 1996 (aged 29)	(Angolan Football Federation) Nacional de Benguela
11	FW	Joicelina Kituto "Joice"	2 April 2003 (aged 22)	(Angolan Football Federation) Petro de Luanda
12	GK	Maria Muecália "Valentina"	3 August 2006 (aged 19)	(Angolan Football Federation) Petro de Luanda
13	DF	Edvirgem de Jesus "Bibi"	4 August 2004 (aged 21)	(Angolan Football Federation) 1° de Agosto
14	MF	Nety Bah "Mamadou"	2 June 2000 (aged 25)	(Angolan Football Federation) 1° de Agosto
15	DF	Cátia Alves "Kecthia"	5 May 2005 (aged 20)	(Angolan Football Federation) Petro de Luanda
16	FW	Maria Viera "Meury"	17 August 2007 (aged 18)	(Angolan Football Federation) Wiliete
17	FW	Arminda Lopes "Ary Papel" (Captain)	10 February 1999 (aged 27)	(Angolan Football Federation) 4 de Julho
18	DF	Margarete Salvador "Margarete"	16 August 2002 (aged 23)	(Angolan Football Federation) 1° de Agosto
20	DF	Henriqueta Luanda "Luanda"	9 June 2002 (aged 23)	(Angolan Football Federation) 1° de Agosto
21	MF	Maria Ponda "Marlene"	3 April 2004 (aged 21)	(Angolan Football Federation) 1° de Agosto
22	GK	Sandrina António "Santa"	5 October 1997 (aged 28)	(Angolan Football Federation) 1° de Agosto
23	DF	Adelina Filipe "Pipi"	15 May 2007 (aged 18)	(Angolan Football Federation) Gloriosos

== Group B ==
=== Zambia ===
Head coach: (Switzerland) Nora Häuptle

Zambia announced their final 23-player squad on 13 February 2026. Rachael Nachula withdrew from the squad due to illness on 18 February and was replaced by Chabwe.

No.	Pos.	Player	Date of birth (age)	Club
1	GK	Catherine Musonda	20 February 1998 (aged 27)	(Football Association of Zambia) Red Arrows
2	DF	Memory Nthala	21 July 1999 (aged 26)	(Football Association of Zambia) Green Buffaloes
3	DF	Judith Soko	31 March 2004 (aged 21)	(Football Association of Zambia) ZESCO Ndola Girls
4	MF	Susan Banda	6 July 1990 (aged 35)	(Turkish Football Federation) Çekmeköy BilgiDoğa Spor
5	DF	Esther Siamfuko	8 August 2004 (aged 21)	(Football Association of Zambia) Green Buffaloes
6	MF	Rhoda Chileshe	8 May 1998 (aged 27)	(Football Association of Zambia) Indeni Roses
7	FW	Eneless Phiri	2 June 2003 (aged 22)	(Football Association of Zambia) ZESCO Ndola Girls
8	DF	Margaret Belemu	24 February 1997 (aged 28)	(Football Association of Zambia) Red Arrows
9	FW	Kabange Mupopo (Captain)	21 September 1992 (aged 33)	(Chinese Football Association) Henan Jianye
10	MF	Sampa Chisanga	13 June 2001 (aged 24)	(Football Association of Zambia) Konkola Blades
11	FW	Regina Chanda	22 June 2002 (aged 23)	(Football Association of Zambia) Zanaco Ladies
12	DF	Margaret Gondwe	1 December 2007 (aged 18)	(Football Association of Zambia) Green Buffaloes
13	FW	Maweta Chilenga	3 August 2003 (aged 22)	(Football Association of Zambia) Green Buffaloes
14	DF	Saliya Mwanza	16 May 2007 (aged 18)	(Football Association of Zambia) Elite Ladies
15	DF	Agness Musesa	11 July 1997 (aged 28)	(Football Association of Zambia) Green Buffaloes
16	GK	Hazel Nali	4 April 1998 (aged 27)	(Football Association of Zambia) ZESCO Ndola Girls
17	FW	Mercy Chipasula	23 March 2008 (aged 17)	(Football Association of Zambia) Kamfinsa Police
18	GK	Mwila Mufunte	7 September 2007 (aged 18)	(Football Association of Zambia) Green Buffaloes
19	FW	Agness Phiri	11 April 2003 (aged 22)	(Football Association of Zambia) Green Buffaloes
20	DF	Ngosa Chabwe	3 March 2001 (aged 24)	(Football Association of Zambia) Indeni Roses
21	MF	Avell Chitundu	30 July 1997 (aged 28)	(Football Association of Zambia) ZESCO Ndola Girls
22	MF	Natasha Witika	6 June 2003 (aged 22)	(Football Association of Zambia) Konkola Blades
23	DF	Blessing Maluba	26 March 2007 (aged 18)	(Football Association of Zambia) Nchanga Queens

=== Botswana ===
Caretaker coach: Gaolethoo Nkutlwisang

Botswana announced their final 24-player squad on 17 February 2026.

No.	Pos.	Player	Date of birth (age)	Club
1	GK	Tshotlhe Mphezulu	3 July 2005 (aged 20)	(Botswana Football Association) Double Action Ladies
2	FW	Mbapeua Hangara	24 September 2006 (aged 19)	(Botswana Football Association) Double Action Ladies
3	DF	Theo George	30 January 2001 (aged 25)	(Botswana Football Association) Jwaneng Galaxy
4	MF	Keotsheohile Kesetse	22 April 2008 (aged 17)	(Botswana Football Association) Double Action Ladies
5	DF	Koketso Molwantwa	12 September 2006 (aged 19)	(Botswana Football Association) Double Action Ladies
6	MF	Dimpho Sedirwa	8 May 2005 (aged 20)	(Botswana Football Association) Double Action Ladies
7	MF	Precious Tlhapi	21 January 2004 (aged 22)	(Botswana Football Association) BDF XI
8	MF	Leungo Senwelo	23 December 2001 (aged 24)	(Botswana Football Association) Mazottie
9	DF	Mokgabo Thanda (Captain)	3 April 1993 (aged 32)	(Football Association of Zambia) Green Buffaloes
10	FW	Peggy Manewe	25 December 2004 (aged 21)	(Botswana Football Association) Double Action Ladies
11	FW	Michelle Abueng	6 May 2001 (aged 24)	(Botswana Football Association) BDF XI
12	FW	Lebogang Dilelo	25 April 2007 (aged 18)	(Botswana Football Association) Dunamis
13	FW	Nolofatso Mamela	21 November 2001 (aged 24)	(Botswana Football Association) Jwaneng Galaxy
14	MF	Bofelo Rantsho	9 April 2003 (aged 22)	(Botswana Football Association) Double Action Ladies
15	DF	Balotlhanyi Johannes	28 June 1994 (aged 31)	(Botswana Football Association) Double Action Ladies
16	GK	Gosego Mokola	22 July 2006 (aged 19)	(Botswana Football Association) Jwaneng Galaxy
17	FW	Oratile Kolobe	28 December 2004 (aged 21)	(Botswana Football Association) Jwaneng Galaxy
18	MF	Hope Lesotlo	15 May 2009 (aged 16)	(Botswana Football Association) Dunamis
19	MF	Laone Moloi	26 November 2000 (aged 25)	(Botswana Football Association) Jwaneng Galaxy
20	DF	Ivy Mankgatau	27 October 2006 (aged 19)	(Botswana Football Association) Orapa All Stars
21	MF	Leano Busang	20 December 1999 (aged 26)	(Botswana Football Association) Gaborone United Ladies
22	DF	Boitumelo Gammu	23 July 1995 (aged 30)	(Namibia Football Association) Ongos
23	GK	Obuisitse Letebele	10 July 1996 (aged 29)	(Botswana Football Association) Security Systems
24	FW	Kelebogile Magaga	8 April 1997 (aged 28)	(Botswana Football Association) Township Rollers

=== Eswatini ===
Head coach: Bongani Makhukhula

Eswatini announced their final 22-player squad on 17 February 2026.

No.	Pos.	Player	Date of birth (age)	Club
1	GK	Nonduduzo Mhlanga (Note: A player named on the official final squad list submitted by their national association did not travel to the tournament. Although registered within the maximum permitted squad, the player remained a non-travelling reserve due to logistical, financial, strategic, or club commitment reasons.)	1 February 2002 (aged 24)	(Eswatini Football Association) Nsingizini Hotspurs
2	MF	Siphelele Mpandza	14 May 2008 (aged 17)	(Eswatini Football Association) Nsingizini Hotspurs
3	MF	Samkelisiwe Fakudze	6 August 2004 (aged 21)	(Eswatini Football Association) Nsingizini Hotspurs
4	DF	Khulekile Mamba	14 May 1999 (aged 26)	(Eswatini Football Association) Green Mamba
5	DF	Siphiwe Mndzebele	24 July 2000 (aged 25)	(Eswatini Football Association) Royal Leopards
6	DF	Ncedo Gamedze	22 March 2000 (aged 25)	(Eswatini Football Association) Nsingizini Hotspurs
7	MF	Bethusile Mathonsi	26 January 2006 (aged 20)	(Eswatini Football Association) Manzini Wanderers
8	MF	Simile Marks	7 May 2002 (aged 23)	(Eswatini Football Association) Young Buffaloes
9	DF	Philisiwe Dlamini	6 November 2004 (aged 21)	(Eswatini Football Association) Nsingizini Hotspurs
10	FW	Nonjabuliso Mokgale	7 July 2003 (aged 22)	(Eswatini Football Association) Young Buffaloes
11	MF	Temasime Sukati	11 June 2006 (aged 19)	(Eswatini Football Association) Nsingizini Hotspurs
12	MF	Samkelisiwe Malinga	20 August 2003 (aged 22)	(Eswatini Football Association) Young Buffaloes
13	DF	Simangele Sikhondze (Captain)	5 February 2002 (aged 24)	(Eswatini Football Association) Young Buffaloes
14	FW	Neliswa Ngcamphalala	25 September 2005 (aged 20)	(Eswatini Football Association) Nsingizini Hotspurs
15	MF	Anele Ngwenya	31 May 2004 (aged 21)	(Eswatini Football Association) Nsingizini Hotspurs
16	GK	Nompilo Dlamini	6 November 2004 (aged 21)	(Eswatini Football Association) Nsingizini Hotspurs
17	MF	Neliswa Msibi	18 April 2004 (aged 21)	(Eswatini Football Association) Manzini Wanderers
18	DF	Badelise Ngozo	27 June 1997 (aged 28)	(Eswatini Football Association) Young Buffaloes
19	MF	Temalangeni Dlamini	18 August 2002 (aged 23)	(Eswatini Football Association) Young Buffaloes
20	MF	Siphilele Masuku	22 February 2005 (aged 20)	(Eswatini Football Association) Green Mamba
21	MF	Nozwelo Shongwe	28 August 2003 (aged 22)	(Eswatini Football Association) AS Interladies
22	FW	Thandolwethu Simelane	23 January 2000 (aged 26)	(Eswatini Football Association) Green Mamba
23	GK	Lindelwa Gwebu	15 May 2006 (aged 19)	(Eswatini Football Association) AS Interladies

=== Zimbabwe ===
Head coach: Sithethelelwe Sibanda

Zimbabwe announced their final 23-player squad on 16 February 2026.

No.	Pos.	Player	Date of birth (age)	Club
1	GK	Delight Matigwene	23 April 2005 (aged 20)	(Zimbabwe Football Association) Chapungu Queens
2	DF	Fiona Kabera	10 June 1998 (aged 27)	(Zimbabwe Football Association) Conduit Soccer Academy
3	DF	Melinda Mapasure	25 May 2005 (aged 20)	(Zimbabwe Football Association) Faithdrive Academy
4	DF	Tumbare Egness	31 July 1993 (aged 32)	(Zimbabwe Football Association) Correctional Queens
5	DF	Bridget Mutarwa	19 July 1997 (aged 28)	(Zimbabwe Football Association) Herentals Queens
6	DF	Nokukhanya Ndlovu	4 April 2000 (aged 25)	(Zimbabwe Football Association) Platinum Royals
7	FW	Anitha Ncube	7 January 2006 (aged 20)	(Zimbabwe Football Association) Kwekwe Queens
8	MF	Macgirl Sipini	15 June 2000 (aged 25)	(Zimbabwe Football Association) Harare City Queens
9	DF	Nobukhosi Ncube (Captain)	17 February 1993 (aged 33)	(Zimbabwe Football Association) Chapungu Queens
10	MF	Ennety Chemhere	19 October 2002 (aged 23)	(Zimbabwe Football Association) Platinum Royals
11	MF	Daisy Kaitano	4 July 1995 (aged 30)	(Zimbabwe Football Association) Black Rhinos Queens
12	MF	Caroline Mangwai	7 June 2004 (aged 21)	(Zimbabwe Football Association) Black Rhinos Queens
13	DF	Christobel Katona	13 February 1999 (aged 27)	(Zimbabwe Football Association) Black Rhinos Queens
14	FW	Ethel Chinyere	12 June 1996 (aged 29)	(Zimbabwe Football Association) Chapungu Queens
15	FW	Rutendo Makore	30 September 1992 (aged 33)	(Zimbabwe Football Association) Black Rhinos Queens
16	GK	Vanessa Lunga	16 June 1994 (aged 31)	(Zimbabwe Football Association) Platinum Royals
17	FW	Privilege Mupeti	29 September 1997 (aged 28)	(Zimbabwe Football Association) Black Rhinos Queens
18	DF	Sheila Antonio	27 August 1999 (aged 26)	(Zimbabwe Football Association) Chapungu Queens
19	MF	Shyline Dambamurono	4 April 2000 (aged 25)	(Zimbabwe Football Association) Herentals Queens
20	MF	Bethel Kondo	20 January 2006 (aged 20)	(Zimbabwe Football Association) Herentals Queens
21	DF	Alice Moyo	26 March 1993 (aged 32)	(Zimbabwe Football Association) Herentals Queens
22	GK	Cynthia Shonga	18 June 2000 (aged 25)	(Zimbabwe Football Association) Herentals Queens
23	FW	Praynance Zvawanda	7 February 2003 (aged 23)	(Zimbabwe Football Association) Herentals Queens

== Group C ==
=== Mozambique ===
Head coach: Luís Fumo

Mozambique announced their final 22-player squad on 17 February 2026.

No.	Pos.	Player	Date of birth (age)	Club
1	GK	Neima Nhamirre	25 January 2002 (aged 24)	(Mozambican Football Federation) CD Costa do Sol
2	DF	Isaura Chidembo	28 February 1999 (aged 26)	(Mozambican Football Federation) Associação Black Bulls
3	DF	Virgínia Fernando	9 November 1999 (aged 26)	(Mozambican Football Federation) UD Songo
4	DF	Hérica Sambo	22 April 2005 (aged 20)	(Mozambican Football Federation) Associação Black Bulls
5	DF	Aurora Ngale	27 January 1992 (aged 34)	(Mozambican Football Federation) Águias Especiais
6	DF	Joana Brenhuze	10 March 2002 (aged 23)	(Mozambican Football Federation) Cocorico da Beira
7	MF	Ilódia Matsinhe	22 February 2007 (aged 18)	(Mozambican Football Federation) Associação Black Bulls
8	MF	Samira Latifo	14 January 1998 (aged 28)	(Mozambican Football Federation) CD Costa do Sol
9	FW	Ângila Mutula	30 December 2004 (aged 21)	(Mozambican Football Federation) CD Costa do Sol
10	MF	Deolinda Gove (Captain)	12 November 1996 (aged 29)	(Mozambican Football Federation) CD Costa do Sol
11	FW	Ermelinda Guinda	5 March 1995 (aged 30)	(Mozambican Football Federation) Matchedje de Chimoio
12	GK	Luísa Machengo	14 November 1998 (aged 27)	(Mozambican Football Federation) Associação Black Bulls
13	DF	Cheila Afonso	28 February 2003 (aged 22)	(Mozambican Football Federation) CD Costa do Sol
14	FW	Marlene Janeiro	5 September 2001 (aged 24)	(Mozambican Football Federation) CD Costa do Sol
15	MF	Cina Manuel	1 September 2001 (aged 24)	(Mozambican Football Federation) UD Lichinga
16	FW	Beatriz Mulangale	11 July 2005 (aged 20)	(Mozambican Football Federation) UD Lichinga
17	DF	Amélia Banze	25 May 1988 (aged 37)	(Mozambican Football Federation) Matchedje de Maputo
18	FW	Marta Miambo	9 July 2004 (aged 21)	(Mozambican Football Federation) Cocorico da Beira
19	MF	Arménia Machava	1 July 2005 (aged 20)	(Mozambican Football Federation) CD Costa do Sol
20	FW	Angélica José	28 November 2003 (aged 22)	(Mozambican Football Federation) Cocorico da Beira
21	FW	Edvânia Enripo	15 October 2004 (aged 21)	(Mozambican Football Federation)
22	GK	Nércia Chilaule	28 September 1998 (aged 27)	(Mozambican Football Federation) CD Costa do Sol

=== Namibia ===
Head coach: Lucky Kakuva

Namibia announced their final 23-player squad on 15 February 2026.

No.	Pos.	Player	Date of birth (age)	Club
1	GK	Tunga Ndiweteko	8 August 2009 (aged 16)	(Namibia Football Association) Arrows Ladies
2	DF	Unondjamo Kaetjavi	5 August 2007 (aged 18)	(Namibia Football Association) Mighty Gunners
3	DF	Iina Katuta	16 December 1986 (aged 39)	(Namibia Football Association) Khomas NAMPOL
4	DF	Julia Rutjindo	18 April 2000 (aged 25)	(Namibia Football Association) Ongos Ladies
5	DF	Emma Naris	8 November 1996 (aged 29)	(Namibia Football Association) Ongos Ladies
6	DF	Utuzuvira Kahiriri	2 December 2004 (aged 21)	(Namibia Football Association) Mighty Gunners
7	DF	Twelikondjela Amukoto	28 July 1991 (aged 34)	(Namibia Football Association) Khomas NAMPOL
8	MF	Zenatha Coleman	25 September 1993 (aged 32)	(Cyprus Turkish Football Association) Doğan Türk Birliği
9	MF	Kylie Van Wyk	1 May 1999 (aged 26)	(Namibia Football Association) Julinho Athletic
10	MF	Millicent Hikuam	6 July 1998 (aged 27)	(Namibia Football Association) Mighty Gunners
11	FW	Leena Alweendo	19 July 2005 (aged 20)	(Namibia Football Association) Mighty Gunners
12	FW	Beverly Uueziua	26 May 1999 (aged 26)	(Namibia Football Association) Julinho Athletic
13	FW	Muhinatjo Hanavi	11 February 2003 (aged 23)	(Namibia Football Association) UNAM Bokkies
14	FW	Ivone Kooper	16 January 1999 (aged 27)	(Namibia Football Association) Ongos Ladies
15	MF	Senoritha Aochamus	3 August 2007 (aged 18)	(Namibia Football Association) Windhoek City Girls
16	GK	Agnes Kauzuu	22 December 1992 (aged 33)	(Namibia Football Association) Ongos Ladies
17	MF	Memory Ngonda	11 February 1998 (aged 28)	(Namibia Football Association) Ongos Ladies
18	FW	Juliana Blou	19 May 1995 (aged 30)	(Namibia Football Association) Ongos Ladies
19	DF	Lorraine Jossob	4 May 1993 (aged 32)	(Namibia Football Association) Mighty Gunners
20	DF	Lovisa Mulunga (Captain)	18 March 1995 (aged 30)	(Namibia Football Association) Ongos Ladies
21	MF	Asteria Angula	11 June 1999 (aged 26)	(Namibia Football Association) Julinho Athletic
22	FW	Nancy Lebang	12 February 2009 (aged 17)	(Namibia Football Association) V-Power Angels
23	GK	Melissa Matheus	14 June 1998 (aged 27)	(Namibia Football Association) Mighty Gunners

=== Madagascar ===
Head coach: Émile Randriamirado

Madagascar announced their final 23-player squad on 20 February 2026.

No.	Pos.	Player	Date of birth (age)	Club
1	GK	Verasantatra Andrianandrasana	30 June 1993 (aged 32)	(Comoros Football Federation) Olympic de Moroni
2	DF	Tsinjo Rasoanantenaina	24 May 2000 (aged 25)	(Malagasy Football Federation) ASJM
3	DF	Aina Rabemaromanga	18 June 2001 (aged 24)	(Malagasy Football Federation) ASKAM AFA
4	DF	Tantely Raheritiana	26 January 2008 (aged 18)	(Malagasy Football Federation) ASKAM AFA
5	DF	Émilienne Solange	8 May 1993 (aged 32)	(Malagasy Football Federation) ASCUF
6	DF	Rina Raharimalala	27 February 1987 (aged 38)	(Malagasy Football Federation) AC Sabnam
7	FW	Aimée Razanampiavy	25 December 1996 (aged 29)	(Comoros Football Federation) United de Domoni
8	FW	Solomampionona Mamonjy	29 May 2002 (aged 23)	(Malagasy Football Federation) Disciples
9	MF	Hanitriniana Nivonirina	20 June 1993 (aged 32)	(Malagasy Football Federation) AC Sabnam
10	MF	Fitiavana Ramanantsoa	5 August 1998 (aged 27)	(Malagasy Football Federation) FFCA
11	MF	Franca Mbolaniana	17 April 2002 (aged 23)	(Malagasy Football Federation) Disciples
12	MF	Helisoa Randrianarivelo	22 July 2000 (aged 25)	(Malagasy Football Federation) AC Sabnam
13	MF	Njaraniaina Randriamialimanantsoa	25 May 2005 (aged 20)	(Malagasy Football Federation) ASKAM AFA
14	MF	Nomenjanahary Raharimampionona	28 November 1998 (aged 27)	(Comoros Football Federation) United de Domoni
15	DF	Anajrasoa Velomanantsolo	7 September 1993 (aged 32)	(Comoros Football Federation) United de Domoni
16	GK	Anastasie Soanarivo	5 February 2005 (aged 21)	(Malagasy Football Federation) ASCUF
17	FW	Andoniaina Rasamison	31 January 1999 (aged 27)	(Malagasy Football Federation) FFCA
18	MF	Angèle Odilicia	29 July 2008 (aged 17)	(Malagasy Football Federation) FC Riziky
19	FW	Marie-Prisca Volanaharinjannahary	7 March 2001 (aged 24)	(Malagasy Football Federation) ASKAM AFA
20	MF	Nasandratriniaina Andriafanomezana	8 October 2007 (aged 18)	(Malagasy Football Federation) YFOMAC
21	MF	Louisa Nambininjanahary	11 June 2005 (aged 20)	(Malagasy Football Federation) Canon
22	GK	Karen Manitriniaina	9 August 2001 (aged 24)	(Malagasy Football Federation) ASKAM AFA
23	MF	Roxina Razafindravola	1 October 2005 (aged 20)	(Malagasy Football Federation) Samba
24	FW	Sanera Ahamadi	4 May 2002 (aged 23)	(French Football Federation) Le Puy Foot 43 Auvergne
