= 2023 COSAFA Women's Championship squads =

2023 COSAFA Women's Championship is an international women's association football tournament set to be held in Gauteng, South Africa from 4 to 15 October 2023. The 12 national teams involved in the tournament were required to register a squad of 23 players. Only players in these squads were eligible to take part in the tournament.

The age listed for each player is on 4 October 2023, the first day of the tournament. The numbers of caps and goals listed for each player do not include any matches played after the start of the tournament. The club listed is the club for which the player last played a competitive match prior to the tournament. A flag is included for coaches who are of a different nationality than their own national team.

== Group A ==
=== Eswatini ===
Head coach: Khoza Zwelibandzi

The final 18-player squad was announced on 30 September 2023.

No.	Pos.	Player	Date of birth (age)	Caps	Goals	Club
1	GK	Tibuyile Ngcamphalala	18 May 1999 (aged 24)			(Eswatini Football Association) Young Buffaloes
2	FW	Tenanile Ngcamphalala	15 February 1998 (aged 25)			(Eswatini Football Association) Young Buffaloes
3	DF	Samkelisiwe Fakedze	6 August 2004 (aged 19)			(Eswatini Football Association) Nsingizini Hotspurs
4	FW	Sebenzile Mavuso	4 February 2000 (aged 23)			(Eswatini Football Association) Young Buffaloes
5	DF	Thulile Dvuba	12 November 1988 (aged 34)			(Eswatini Football Association) Young Buffaloes
6	MF	Mazwi Dube	29 September 1993 (aged 30)			(Eswatini Football Association) Young Buffaloes
7	FW	Celiwe Nkambule	19 February 1993 (aged 30)			(Eswatini Football Association) Young Buffaloes
8	MF	Nokuthula Ndlovu	4 October 2000 (aged 23)			(Eswatini Football Association) Green Mamba
9	FW	Nomfuneko Gamedze	11 September 1998 (aged 25)			(Eswatini Football Association) Mbabane Swallows
12	MF	Sisanda Ndzinisa	31 May 2002 (aged 21)			(Eswatini Football Association) Young Buffaloes
13	DF	Simangele Sikhondze	5 February 2002 (aged 21)			(Eswatini Football Association) Young Buffaloes
14	FW	Thulisile Thring	14 December 1998 (aged 24)			(Eswatini Football Association) Young Buffaloes
15	DF	Welile Ndwandwe	7 November 1998 (aged 24)			(Eswatini Football Association) Young Buffaloes
16	GK	Gcinile Dlamini	10 June 2003 (aged 20)			(Eswatini Football Association) Young Buffaloes
17	DF	Futhi Dlamini	11 July 1993 (aged 30)			(Eswatini Football Association) Young Buffaloes
18	DF	Badelisile Ngozo	27 June 1997 (aged 26)			(Eswatini Football Association) Young Buffaloes
19	MF	Sikhanyiso Magagula	8 March 1997 (aged 26)			(Eswatini Football Association) Young Buffaloes
20	MF	Nondumiso Dlamini	31 January 1999 (aged 24)			(Eswatini Football Association) Young Buffaloes

=== Madagascar ===
Head coach: Beatrice Theodore

The final 23-player squad was announced on 30 September 2023.

No.	Pos.	Player	Date of birth (age)	Caps	Goals	Club
1	GK	Anastasie Rasoanarivo	5 February 2005 (aged 18)			(Malagasy Football Federation) ASCUF
2	MF	Noëlla Razafindrasoa	12 December 2002 (aged 20)			(Malagasy Football Federation) FCF
3	DF	Geneviève Razafindramilina	12 November 1986 (aged 36)			(Malagasy Football Federation) SABNAM
4	DF	Emilienne Solange	8 May 1993 (aged 30)			(Malagasy Football Federation) ASCUF
5	DF	Thérèse Fabiola Tolizafy	26 November 1990 (aged 32)			(Malagasy Football Federation) AFDA
6	MF	Veronique Raharimalala	27 February 1987 (aged 36)			(Malagasy Football Federation) SABNAM
7	FW	Mamisoa Rasoarimalala	27 May 2000 (aged 23)			(Malagasy Football Federation) Disciples FC
8	MF	Nadia Ravaosolonirimanana	4 March 1991 (aged 32)			(Malagasy Football Federation) MIFA
9	MF	Hanitriniaina Nivonirina	20 June 1993 (aged 30)			(Malagasy Football Federation) SABNAM
10	MF	Fitiavana Sitrakiniaina Ramanantsoa	5 August 1998 (aged 25)			(Malagasy Football Federation) Disciples FC
11	MF	Elisa Rasoarimamonjy	27 July 1991 (aged 32)			(Malagasy Football Federation) Disciples FC
12	MF	Heliosa Haingo Randrianarivelo	22 July 2000 (aged 23)			(Malagasy Football Federation) SABNAM
13	FW	Farelle Ravelomanana	17 December 2003 (aged 19)			(Malagasy Football Federation) ASCUF
14	DF	Zirah Adylaya	15 August 2002 (aged 21)			(Malagasy Football Federation) SABNAM
15	DF	Anjarasoa Velomanantsoly	7 September 1993 (aged 30)			(Malagasy Football Federation) MIFA
16	GK	Christina Franiania	4 November 2003 (aged 19)			(Malagasy Football Federation) Disciples FC
17	MF	Andoniaina Rasamison	31 January 1999 (aged 24)			(Malagasy Football Federation) MIFA
18	MF	Razanarisoa Julie Solonilaina	28 January 1995 (aged 28)			(Malagasy Football Federation) ASCUF
19	DF	Irlac Floriette Ramanantenasoa	13 July 1986 (aged 37)			(Malagasy Football Federation) Disciples FC
20	MF	Jackia Bao	24 August 1990 (aged 33)			(Malagasy Football Federation) SOM
21	DF	Florine Mamitine	10 August 1990 (aged 33)			(Malagasy Football Federation) SOM
22	MF	Jacques Novelinah Tombo	15 October 2000 (aged 22)			(Malagasy Football Federation) AFDA
23	DF	Ouarda Ouarda	18 February 1991 (aged 32)			(Malagasy Football Federation) AFDA

=== Malawi ===
Head coach: Lovemore Fazili

The final 23-player squad was announced on 1 October 2023.

No.	Pos.	Player	Date of birth (age)	Caps	Goals	Club
1	GK	Mercy Sikelo	28 November 2000 (aged 22)			(Football Association of Malawi) Ntopwa FC
2	DF	Faith Chinzimu	21 February 2007 (aged 16)			(Football Association of Malawi) Ascent Academy
3	DF	Mary Major	28 June 1998 (aged 25)			(Football Association of Malawi) MDF Lioness
4	DF	Chimwemwe Madise	6 April 1992 (aged 31)			(Football Association of Zambia) Elite Ladies
5	DF	Patricia Nyirenda	8 April 1998 (aged 25)			(Football Association of Malawi) MDF Lioness
6	MF	Rose Kabzere	16 June 2006 (aged 17)			(Football Association of Malawi) Ascent Academy
7	FW	Asimenye Simwaka	8 August 1997 (aged 26)			(Football Association of Malawi) MDF Lioness
8	FW	Chikondi Gondwe	16 September 1998 (aged 25)			(Football Association of Malawi) Silver Strikers Ladies
9	FW	Sabina Thom	3 March 1996 (aged 27)			(Congolese Association Football Federation) TP Mazembe
10	FW	Temwa Chawinga (captain)	20 September 1998 (aged 25)			(Chinese Football Association) Wuhan Jianghan University
11	MF	Sarah Mlimbika	11 January 2007 (aged 16)			(Football Association of Malawi) Ndirande Soccer Giants
12	MF	Lyna James	23 November 1998 (aged 24)			(Football Association of Malawi) Nyasa Big Bullets
13	FW	Vanessa Chikupila	2 April 1991 (aged 32)			(Football Association of Malawi) Nyasa Big Bullets
14	DF	Maggie Chavula	28 April 2005 (aged 18)			(Football Association of Malawi) Ascent Academy
15	MF	Leticia Chinyamula	12 June 2006 (aged 17)			(Football Association of Malawi) Ascent Academy
16	GK	Esther Maulidi	3 February 2008 (aged 15)			(Football Association of Malawi) Mighty Wanderers Queens
17	MF	Madyina Nguluwe	18 June 1996 (aged 27)			(Football Association of Malawi) Silver Strikers Ladies
18	DF	Ireen Khumalo	12 December 2003 (aged 19)			(Football Association of Malawi) Silver Strikers Ladies
19	MF	Carolyn Mathyola	3 May 1999 (aged 24)			(Football Association of Malawi) Silver Strikers Ladies
20	MF	Funny Magombo	5 April 2005 (aged 18)			(Football Association of Malawi) Ntopwa FC
21	DF	Rose Alufandika	4 November 2005 (aged 17)			(Football Association of Malawi) Ntopwa FC
22	DF	Bernadette Mkandawawire	28 September 2003 (aged 20)			(Football Association of Malawi) Nyasa Big Bullets
23	GK	Martha Cosmas	15 March 2001 (aged 22)			(Football Association of Malawi) Civil Service

=== South Africa ===
Head coach: Desiree Ellis

The final 23-player squad was announced on 4 October 2023.

No.	Pos.	Player	Date of birth (age)	Caps	Goals	Club
1	GK	Victoria Tshidi Muroa	3 March 1995 (aged 28)			(South African Football Association) TUT
2	DF	Asanda Hadebe	13 October 2003 (aged 19)			(South African Football Association) Sunflowers
3	DF	Lonathemba Mhlongo	23 August 2002 (aged 21)			(South African Football Association) UWC
4	DF	Boitumelo Rasehlo	18 October 1998 (aged 24)			(South African Football Association) JVW
5	DF	Morongwa Manemela	12 April 2000 (aged 23)			(South African Football Association) Tuks
6	MF	Thubelihle Shamase	16 January 2002 (aged 21)			(South African Football Association) UJ
7	FW	Jade Jones				(South African Football Association) Magic Ladies
8	MF	Sphumelele Shamase	16 January 2002 (aged 21)			(South African Football Association) UJ
9	FW	Tshogofatso Motlogelwa	29 April 2000 (aged 23)			(South African Football Association) TUT
10	MF	Nicole Michael	17 January 2001 (aged 22)			(South African Football Association) TS Galaxy
11	DF	Ntombifikile Ndlovu	23 July 1998 (aged 25)			(South African Football Association) UWC
12	MF	Thalea Smidt	27 December 1997 (aged 25)			(South African Football Association) UJ
13	DF	Unathi Simayile	8 February 2001 (aged 22)			(South African Football Association) UWC
14	FW	Chelsea Daniels	8 April 2002 (aged 21)			(South African Football Association) UWC
15	MF	Ayesha Moosa	30 October 2003 (aged 19)			(South African Football Association) UJ
16	GK	Dineo Magagula	14 October 1994 (aged 28)			(South African Football Association) TUT
17	DF	Raesetja Mogale	12 April 1990 (aged 33)			(South African Football Association) Royal AM
18	FW	Samkelisiwe Selana	7 July 2004 (aged 19)			(South African Football Association) TS Galaxy
19	DF	Khensani Nkuna	23 March 1998 (aged 25)			(South African Football Association) Royal AM
20	FW	Lizza Mokoena	8 April 1997 (aged 26)			(South African Football Association) TUT
21	GK	Kebotseng Moletsane (captain)	3 March 1995 (aged 28)			(South African Football Association) Royal AM
22	MF	Nomfundo Buthelezi	20 February 1999 (aged 24)			(South African Football Association) Durban
23	FW	Wendy Shongwe	18 January 2003 (aged 20)			(South African Football Association) Tuks

== Group B ==
=== Angola ===
Head coach: Sousa Garcia

The final 23-player squad was announced on 21 September 2023.

No.	Pos.	Player	Date of birth (age)	Caps	Goals	Club
1	GK	Odilia Kaita	17 November 2001 (aged 21)			(Angolan Football Federation) Joao de Almeida
2	DF	Cátia Alves	5 May 2005 (aged 18)			(Angolan Football Federation) CD 1º de Agosto
3	DF	Manuela Simão	4 April 2002 (aged 21)			(Angolan Football Federation) Terra Novo
4	DF	Emacleny Lando	27 December 2002 (aged 20)			(Angolan Football Federation) Terra Novo
5	DF	Matondo Matuvova	19 April 2002 (aged 21)			(Angolan Football Federation) CD 1º de Agosto
6	MF	Sara Luvunga	12 September 1999 (aged 24)			(Angolan Football Federation) CD 1º de Agosto
7	FW	Cristina Makua	14 May 1995 (aged 28)			(Angolan Football Federation) CD 1º de Agosto
8	MF	Francisca de Azevedo	10 September 1997 (aged 26)			(Angolan Football Federation) Terra Novo
9	MF	Rosa Ngueve Jamba	7 September 1996 (aged 27)			(Angolan Football Federation) Glorioso FC
10	MF	Zeferina Caupe	11 July 1999 (aged 24)			(Angolan Football Federation) CD Exercito
11	MF	Marlene Ponda	3 April 2004 (aged 19)			(Angolan Football Federation) CD 1º de Agosto
12	GK	Rita Luís José	20 March 1998 (aged 25)			(Angolan Football Federation) 4 de Junho
13	MF	Victoria Fernando	2 June 2002 (aged 21)			(Angolan Football Federation) CD 1º de Agosto
14	MF	Joana Campos	31 May 2003 (aged 20)			(Angolan Football Federation) Atlético Petróleos de Luanda
15	DF	Vanuza Francisco	24 July 2002 (aged 21)			(Angolan Football Federation) CD 1º de Agosto
16	MF	Gullhermina sachlmola	25 October 2003 (aged 19)			(Angolan Football Federation) Nacional BenguelaNacional Benguela
17	MF	Arminda lopes	10 December 1996 (aged 26)			(Angolan Football Federation) 4 de Junho
18	MF	Margarete Mendes	16 August 2002 (aged 21)			(Angolan Football Federation) CD 1º de Agosto
19	MF	Ana Manuel da Costa	13 October 2001 (aged 21)			(Angolan Football Federation) CD 1º de Agosto
20	MF	Ladaínha Silyomunu Haufiku	4 March 1992 (aged 31)			(Angolan Football Federation) Atletico Cunene
21	MF	Pauleta	4 December 1996 (aged 26)			(Angolan Football Federation) Nacional Benguela
22	MF	Luciana Alberto				(Angolan Football Federation)
23	FW	Marcelina Bera	16 June 1995 (aged 28)			(Angolan Football Federation) Guelson FC

=== Comoros ===
Head coach:

The final 23-player squad was announced on 18 September 2023.

No.	Pos.	Player	Date of birth (age)	Caps	Goals	Club
1	GK	Nathanie Anrifou				(Comoros Football Federation) FC Mwalimdjini
2	DF	Naima Kadafi	22 December 2005 (aged 17)			(Comoros Football Federation) Twamaya FC
3	DF	Nourouzamane Ahamed	16 March 2004 (aged 19)			(Comoros Football Federation) FC Mwalimdjini
4	MF	Dalila Damdji Adinane				(Comoros Football Federation) Ouvanga Espoir de Moya
5	DF	Samra Ali				(Comoros Football Federation) FC de Ouani
6	DF	Nourdati Mohamed Boinali	2 October 1999 (aged 24)			(Comoros Football Federation) Ouvanga Espoir de Moya
7	FW	Housnatillah binti Charanfa				(Comoros Football Federation) Volcan Club de Moroni
8	MF	Endjouatiddine Mohamed				(Comoros Football Federation) FC Inanga
9	FW	Anllaouia Hadhirami Ali	9 March 2003 (aged 20)			(Comoros Football Federation) Olympique de Moroni
10	DF	Hairyat Abdourahmane	7 April 1994 (aged 29)			(Comoros Football Federation) Olympique de Moroni
11	FW	Roukiat Mohamed Ahamadi				(Comoros Football Federation) FC Mwalimdjini
12	DF	Souniati Soula Moussa				(Comoros Football Federation) Etoile du Centre de Salamani
13	MF	Houfrane Mistoihi				(Comoros Football Federation) FC de Ouani
14	DF	Zalhata Soilihi	13 September 1999 (aged 24)			(Comoros Football Federation) Olympique de Moroni
15	FW	Nakchat Mohamed				(Comoros Football Federation) Ouvanga Espoir de Moya
16	GK	Zoumroiti Onzadi Halidi				(Comoros Football Federation) FC Mirontsy
17	DF	Chaharzad Mohamed Boinali				(Comoros Football Federation) Ouvanga Espoir de Moya
18	FW	Nasrati Saïd Ali				(Comoros Football Federation) Panasco de Malé
19	MF	Moustaoui Saïd Thoueni				(Comoros Football Federation) FC Domoni
20	MF	Goula Sufati Ainati				(Comoros Football Federation) Twamaya FC
21	MF	Maltoufa Mchangama	7 November 2002 (aged 20)			(Comoros Football Federation) Olympique de Moroni
22	FW	Joséphine Théophile Georges				(Comoros Football Federation) FC de Ouani
23	GK	Amina Ben Ali Abdou	26 April 2005 (aged 18)			(Comoros Football Federation) FC Inanga

=== Mozambique ===
Head coach: Luis Victor Fumo

The final 22-player squad was announced on 2 October 2023.

No.	Pos.	Player	Date of birth (age)	Caps	Goals	Club
1	GK	Neima Nhamirre	25 January 2002 (age 24)			(Mozambican Football Federation) CD Costa do Sol
2	DF	Isaura Chidembo	28 February 1999 (age 27)			(Mozambican Football Federation) Desportivo Da Matola
3	DF	Virgínia Fernando	9 November 1999 (age 26)			(Mozambican Football Federation) União Desportiva de Lichinga
4	DF	Rosa Mainque	29 April 1999 (age 27)			(Mozambican Football Federation) CD Costa do Sol
5	MF	Isabel Jorge	8 April 1999 (age 27)			(Mozambican Football Federation) Águias Especiais
6	DF	Joana Ataíde	10 March 2002 (age 24)			(Mozambican Football Federation) Cocoricó da Beira
7	FW	Lónica Tsanwane	15 April 1996 (age 30)			(Mozambican Football Federation) Black Bulls
8	MF	Albertina Pondja	16 May 1993 (age 33)			(Mozambican Football Federation) CD Costa do Sol
9	MF	Inês Chingueleze	24 February 1990 (age 36)			(Mozambican Football Federation) CD Costa do Sol
10	MF	Deolinda Gove	12 November 1996 (age 29)			(Mozambican Football Federation) Black Bulls
11	FW	Cidália Cuta	27 October 1998 (age 27)			(Tanzania Football Federation) Yanga Princess
12	GK	Fátima Teodoro	7 February 1997 (age 29)			(Mozambican Football Federation) Viveiros de Nampula
13	DF	Amélia Mazembe	2 July 2000 (age 26)			(Mozambican Football Federation) Ferroviário da Beira
14	FW	Roseline Mondlane	13 June 2004 (age 22)			(Mozambican Football Federation) Ferroviário da Beira
15	FW	Cina Manuel	22 June 1993 (age 33)			(Mozambican Football Federation) União Desportiva de Lichinga
16	DF	Emília Saene	18 December 1998 (age 27)			(Mozambican Football Federation) CD Costa do Sol
17	DF	Amélia Banze	25 May 1988 (age 38)			(Mozambican Football Federation) CD Matchedje de Maputo
18	FW	Steiza Sumburane	21 August 1998 (age 27)			(Mozambican Football Federation) Águias Especiais
20	MF	Lúcia Leila	22 December 1993 (age 32)			(Danish Football Association) B.93
21	FW	Esmeralda Davide	12 December 2002 (age 23)			(Mozambican Football Federation) União Desportiva de Lichinga
22	GK	Assumini Linge	11 May 1998 (age 28)			(Mozambican Football Federation) Ferroviário da Beira
23	DF	Elisabeth Chimwaze	15 November 2000 (age 25)			(Mozambican Football Federation) Desportivo de Angónia

=== Zambia ===
Head coach: Florence Nkatya

The final 23-player squad was announced on 29 September 2023.

No.	Pos.	Player	Date of birth (age)	Caps	Goals	Club
1	GK	Ngambo Musole	26 June 1998 (aged 25)			(Football Association of Zambia) Green Buffaloes
2	DF	Judith Soko	31 March 2004 (aged 19)			(Football Association of Zambia) YASA
3	DF	Jacqueline Nkole	5 August 1998 (aged 25)			(Football Association of Zambia) Indeni Roses
4	MF	Susan Banda	6 July 1990 (aged 33)			(Football Association of Zambia) Red Arrows
5	DF	Pauline Zulu	3 March 2003 (age 23)			(Football Association of Zambia) Elite Ladies
6	MF	Regina Chanda	22 June 2002 (aged 21)			(Football Association of Zambia) ZANACO Ladies
7	FW	Fridah Kabwe	21 January 1998 (aged 25)			(Football Association of Zambia) ZESCO Ndola Girls
8	FW	Eneless Phiri	2 June 2003 (aged 20)			(Football Association of Zambia) Green Buffaloes
9	FW	Agness Phiri	11 April 2003 (aged 20)			(Football Association of Zambia) Green Buffaloes
10	MF	Comfort Selemani	28 November 2004 (aged 18)			(Football Association of Zambia) Elite Ladies
11	MF	Salome Phiri	8 December 2002 (aged 20)			(Football Association of Zambia) Green Buffaloes
12	MF	Evarine Katongo	29 December 2002 (aged 20)			(Football Association of Zambia) ZISD Women
13	FW	Sarah Jere	31 October 2000 (aged 22)			(Football Association of Zambia) ZANACO Ladies
14	FW	Rita Mwila Kaoma	5 December 2004 (aged 18)			(Football Association of Zambia) Police Dove Queens
15	DF	Lushomo Mweemba	10 April 2001 (aged 22)			(Football Association of Zambia) Green Buffaloes
16	GK	Leticia Lungu	7 August 2004 (aged 19)			(Football Association of Zambia) ZESCO Ndola Girls
17	DF	Esther Siamfuko	8 August 2004 (aged 19)			(Football Association of Zambia) Green Buffaloes
18	GK	Loveness Tonge	8 November 2003 (aged 19)			(Football Association of Zambia) Green Eagles
19	FW	Natasha Nanyangwe	27 June 1999 (aged 24)			(Football Association of Zambia) Green Buffaloes
20	DF	Thelma Chella	6 February 2005 (age 21)			(Football Association of Zambia) ZANACO Ladies
21	FW	Maylan Mulenga	17 May 2003 (aged 20)			(Football Association of Zambia) Green Buffaloes
22	MF	Esther Banda	21 November 2004 (aged 18)			(Football Association of Zambia) BUSA
23	DF	Vast Phiri	3 February 1996 (aged 27)			(Football Association of Zambia) ZESCO Ndola Girls

== Group C ==
=== Botswana ===
Head coach: Mohambi Saulos

The final 20-player squad was announced on 6 October 2023.

No.	Pos.	Player	Date of birth (age)	Caps	Goals	Club
1	GK	Tlamelo Pheresi	30 November 1996 (aged 26)			(Botswana Football Association) Gaborone United
2	DF	Kesegofetse Mochawe	30 July 1995 (aged 28)			Unattached
3	DF	Nancy Baeletse	21 March 1996 (aged 27)			(Botswana Football Association) Gaborone United
4	DF	Masego Montsho	15 June 1991 (aged 32)			(Botswana Football Association) Security Systems
5	FW	Theo Pearl George	30 January 2000 (aged 23)			(Botswana Football Association) Prisons XI
6	MF	Golebaone Selebatso	22 March 1991 (aged 32)			(Botswana Football Association) Gaborone United
8	MF	Lone Gaofetoge	16 July 2001 (aged 22)			(Botswana Football Association) Gaborone United
9	MF	Mokgabo Thanda	3 April 1993 (aged 30)			(Football Association of Zambia) Yasa Queens
10	MF	Lesego Radiakanyo	27 June 1999 (aged 24)			(Botswana Football Association) Double Action
11	FW	Michelle Abueng	6 May 2001 (aged 22)			(Botswana Football Association) BDF XI
12	MF	Obonetse Rathari	11 November 2002 (aged 20)			(Botswana Football Association) Double Action
13	MF	Keitumetse Dithebe	17 July 2002 (aged 21)			(Botswana Football Association) Gaborone United
14	DF	Veronicah Mogotsi	21 August 1992 (aged 31)			(Botswana Football Association) Double Action
15	MF	Balothanyi Johannes	28 June 1994 (aged 29)			(Botswana Football Association) Double Action
17	MF	Messia Radinonyane	13 February 2001 (aged 22)			(Botswana Football Association) Orapa All Stars
18	FW	Leungo Senwelo	23 December 2001 (aged 21)			(Botswana Football Association) Double Action
19	DF	Lesego Sikwane	19 April 2003 (aged 20)			(Botswana Football Association) Security Systems
20	FW	Goanyadiwe Ontlametse	12 January 2000 (aged 23)			(Botswana Football Association) Double Action
21	MF	Annah Nametso Sechane	7 February 2001 (aged 22)			(Botswana Football Association) Gaborone United
22	MF	Goitsemang Tlamma	7 August 1998 (aged 25)			(Botswana Football Association) Gaborone United

=== Lesotho ===
Head coach: Pule Khojane

The final 23-player squad was announced on 2 October 2023.

No.	Pos.	Player	Date of birth (age)	Caps	Goals	Club
1	GK	Thuto Maifo	25 May 1995 (aged 28)			(Lesotho Football Association) LMPS Ladies
2	DF	Mosili Mots'oeneng	15 August 1996 (aged 27)			(South African Football Association) Royal AM
3	DF	Ts'oanelo Leboka	21 July 1996 (aged 27)			(Lesotho Football Association) LDF Ladies
4	MF	Nthabeleng Makhabane	17 May 2003 (aged 20)			(Lesotho Football Association) LDF Ladies
5	DF	Thato Mapepesa	24 January 2003 (aged 20)			(Lesotho Football Association) LDF Ladies
6	MF	Mosele Pita	25 May 1998 (aged 25)			(Lesotho Football Association) LDF Ladies
7	MF	Molemo Mokhothu	8 October 1998 (aged 24)			(Lesotho Football Association) Kick 4 Life
8	FW	Lits'eoane Maloro				(South African Football Association) Royal AM
9	DF	Lerato Mphou	30 October 1999 (aged 23)			(Lesotho Football Association) LDF Ladies
10	MF	Boitumelo Rabale	5 August 1996 (aged 27)			(South African Football Association) Mamelodi Sundowns
11	FW	Nteboheleng Mohoshela	25 December 2000 (aged 22)			(Lesotho Football Association) Kick 4 Life
12	FW	Makhotso Moalosi	4 July 2003 (aged 20)			(Lesotho Football Association) Berea Ladies
13	DF	Limakatso Matibi	16 January 2000 (aged 23)			(Lesotho Football Association) LMPS Ladies
14	MF	Marsu'ukulu Motloheloa	1 December 2001 (aged 21)			(Lesotho Football Association) Kick 4 Life
15	FW	Phuzile Molefe	18 January 1997 (aged 26)			(Lesotho Football Association) LDF Ladies
16	GK	Mpolokeng Mothomots'oana	11 October 2000 (aged 22)			(Lesotho Football Association) LDF Ladies
17	MF	Nthabeleng Potsane	29 October 1998 (aged 24)			(Lesotho Football Association) LDF Ladies
18	MF	Maseriti Mohlolo	22 April 1997 (aged 26)			(Lesotho Football Association) LDF Ladies
19	DF	Bokang Ntsane	20 July 2002 (aged 21)			(Lesotho Football Association) LDF Ladies
20	DF	Ntsatsi Khakanyo	26 July 1992 (aged 31)			(Lesotho Football Association) LDF Ladies
21	DF	Mathebe Ramphielo	22 June 1996 (aged 27)			(Lesotho Football Association) LMPS Ladies
22	MF	Bohlokoa Mothala	10 September 1999 (aged 24)			(Lesotho Football Association) Stoko
23	GK	Mamakhabane Makibinyane	27 October 2002 (aged 20)			(Lesotho Football Association) LDF Ladies

=== Namibia ===
Head coach: Mervin Mbakera

The final 23-player squad was announced on 3 October 2023.

No.	Pos.	Player	Date of birth (age)	Caps	Goals	Club
1	GK	Queandra Kasume Batista	7 January 1999 (aged 24)			(Namibia Football Association) UNAM Bokkies
2	DF	Lilie Kasheeta	4 April 1999 (aged 24)			(Namibia Football Association) Nampol Ladies
3	DF	Ndapewa Katuta	16 December 1986 (aged 36)			(Namibia Football Association) Nampol Ladies
4	DF	Julia Rutjindo	18 April 2000 (aged 23)			(Namibia Football Association) Girls and Goals
5	DF	Emma Naris	8 November 1996 (aged 26)			(Namibia Football Association) Tura Magic FC
6	DF	Hilma Kanyama	27 September 2000 (aged 23)			(Namibia Football Association) Ongwediva Queens
7	MF	Twelikondjela Amukoto	28 July 1991 (aged 32)			(Namibia Football Association) Nampol Ladies
8	MF	Lorraine Jossob	4 May 1993 (aged 30)			(Namibia Football Association) Arrows Ladies
9	MF	Thomalina Adams	6 July 1993 (aged 30)			(Namibia Football Association) Tura Magic FC
10	MF	Millicent Hikuam	6 July 1998 (aged 25)			(United States Soccer Federation) Capital FC Atletica
11	FW	Anna Shikusho	5 April 1995 (aged 28)			(Namibia Football Association) Tura Magic FC
12	FW	Beverly Uueziua	26 May 1999 (aged 24)			(Namibia Football Association) Girls and Goals
13	DF	Vijakura Tjingaete	27 December 2003 (aged 19)			(Namibia Football Association) Girls and Goals
14	MF	Ivone Kooper	16 January 1999 (aged 24)			(Namibia Football Association) Tura Magic FC
15	DF	Lydiana Nanamus	30 November 1998 (aged 24)			(Namibia Football Association) Tura Magic FC
16	GK	Agnes Kauzuu	22 December 1992 (aged 30)			(Namibia Football Association) Tura Magic FC
17	MF	Memory Ngonda	11 February 1998 (aged 25)			(Namibia Football Association) Tura Magic FC
18	MF	Juliana Blou	19 May 1995 (aged 28)			(Namibia Football Association) Tura Magic FC
19	GK	Melisa Matheus	14 June 1998 (aged 25)			(Namibia Football Association) Beauties
20	DF	Lovisa Mulunga	18 March 1995 (aged 28)			(Namibia Football Association) Tura Magic FC
21	MF	Elina Uulumbu	22 July 1994 (aged 29)			(Namibia Football Association) Nampol Ladies
22	FW	Fiola Vliete	22 October 1998 (aged 24)			(Namibia Football Association) Beauties
23	MF	Meltret Ujamba	30 November 1995 (aged 27)			(Namibia Football Association) UNAM Bokkies

=== Zimbabwe ===
Head coach: Shadreck Mlauzi

The final 21-player squad was announced on 2 October 2023.

No.	Pos.	Player	Date of birth (age)	Caps	Goals	Club
1	GK	Chido Dzingirai	25 October 1991 (aged 31)			(Zimbabwe Football Association) ZISD Queens
3	DF	Edline Mutumbami	13 October 1996 (aged 26)			(Zimbabwe Football Association) Chapungu Queens
5	DF	Thelma Masawi	26 December 2002 (aged 20)			(Zimbabwe Football Association) Platinum Royals
6	DF	Nokukhanya Ndlovu	7 January 2003 (aged 20)			(Zimbabwe Football Association) Black Rhinos Queens
7	FW	Rudo Neshamba	10 February 1992 (aged 31)			(Zimbabwe Football Association) Harare City Queens
8	DF	Vimbai Mharadzi	4 July 1995 (aged 28)			(Zimbabwe Football Association) Black Rhinos Queens
9	DF	Nobukhosi Ncube	17 February 1993 (aged 30)			(Zimbabwe Football Association) Chapungu Queens
10	MF	Ennety Chemhere	19 October 2002 (aged 20)			(Zimbabwe Football Association) Ubuntu Queens
11	DF	Daisy Kaitano	20 September 1993 (aged 30)			(Zimbabwe Football Association) Black Rhinos Queens
12	FW	Praynance Zvawanda	7 February 2003 (aged 20)			(Zimbabwe Football Association) Herentals Queens
13	FW	Christobel Katona	13 February 1999 (aged 24)			(Zimbabwe Football Association) Black Rhinos Queens
14	DF	Eunice Chibanda	26 March 1993 (aged 30)			(Zimbabwe Football Association) Black Rhinos Queens
15	DF	Purity Mugayi	15 December 1998 (aged 24)			(Zimbabwe Football Association) Black Rhinos Queens
16	GK	Lindiwe Magwede	1 December 1991 (aged 31)			(Zimbabwe Football Association) Cyclone
17	MF	Priviledge Mupeti	29 September 1997 (aged 26)			(Zimbabwe Football Association) Black Rhinos Queens
18	FW	Maudy Mafuruse	24 April 1999 (aged 24)			(Zimbabwe Football Association) Herentals Queens
19	FW	Shyline Dambamuromo	4 April 2000 (aged 23)			(Zimbabwe Football Association) Herentals Queens
20	MF	Tanyaradzwa Chihoro	1 December 2004 (aged 18)			(Zimbabwe Football Association) Maningi Queens
21	MF	Alice Moyo	8 January 2000 (aged 23)			(Zimbabwe Football Association) Black Rhinos Queens
22	GK	Cynthia Shonga	18 June 2000 (aged 23)			(Zimbabwe Football Association) Faith Drive
23	MF	Patience Nyarai Ndhlovu	10 February 2006 (aged 17)			(Zimbabwe Football Association) Lozikeyi Queens
