= Olivia Phikani =

Malawian footballer

Personal information
- Place of birth: Malawi
- Position: Defender

Team information
- Current team: Ntopwa

International career
Years	Team	Apps	(Gls)
- Malawi
Medal record
Women's Africa Cup of Nations
Silver medal – second place	2026 Morocco

Olivia Phikani is a Malawian footballer who plays as a defender for the Malawi national team and Ntopwa, with whom she won the 2022 FAM National Women’s Championship. Phikani was in the squad for Malawi's debut at the 2026 Women's Africa Cup of Nations in 2026.

== Career ==
The 2022 FAM National Women’s Championship final was decided when Ntopwa Women’s Football Club defeated Ascent Academy in a penalty shoot-out following a 1-1 draw. Phikani was one of five Ntopwas players to score goals in the penalties.

In August 2023, the team, managed by James Sangala, travelled to Durban, South Africa, to compete in the CAF Women’s Champion’s League COSAFA Qualifiers.

In April 2025, Phikani travelled to South Africa as part of the national team in order to play two matches against the South Africa women's national soccer team. The team was significantly weakened because of administrative complications that led to the absence of key players, such as the Chawinga sisters and Rose Kabzere. Phikani featured in the matches played in Soweto and Pretoria.

In June 2025, Phikani was chosen to play as a defender as part of Lovemore Fazili's 24 strong Malawian National team to play Morocco in Casablanca. She left the Kukoma Ntopwa Women team to join a training session in Blantyre before they left for Casablanca. The teams' manager paid special attention of the defense in this game. Fazili chose her again as a defender in the national women's team in March 2026 for the Four Nations FIFA Series matches in Kenya. She was one of four players from the Kukoma Ntopwa Women team to be called up. The others were the lead goalkeeper Mercy Sikelo, fellow defender Rose Alufandika and midfielder Funny Magombo.

Phikani was part of the squad at the 2026 Women’s Africa Cup of Nations (WAFCON) in August 2026 in Rabat, Morocco. She and the squad earned their first place for the Malawian team in the 2027 World Cup. Malawi has never competed before at that level. Malawi joined Algeria, Morocco and Cameroon to qualify for the 2027 Women's World Cup in Brazil.
