= Ireen Sibande =

Malawian footballer

Personal information
- National team: Malawi National Women's Football Team, The Scorchers

Sport
- Sport: Football
- Position: Goalkeeper

Ireen Sibande or Irene Sibande is a Malawian goalkeeper for the Silver Strikers Ladies. Sibande was the leading goalkeeper in Malawi in 2025 and her team won the national league. As a consequence she went to Botswana to compete in the CAF Women's Champions League in 2026. She has played for the U20 and the National team.

== Club career ==
Sibande started out at Ascent Academy and she moved to the Silver Strikers Ladies in 2022.

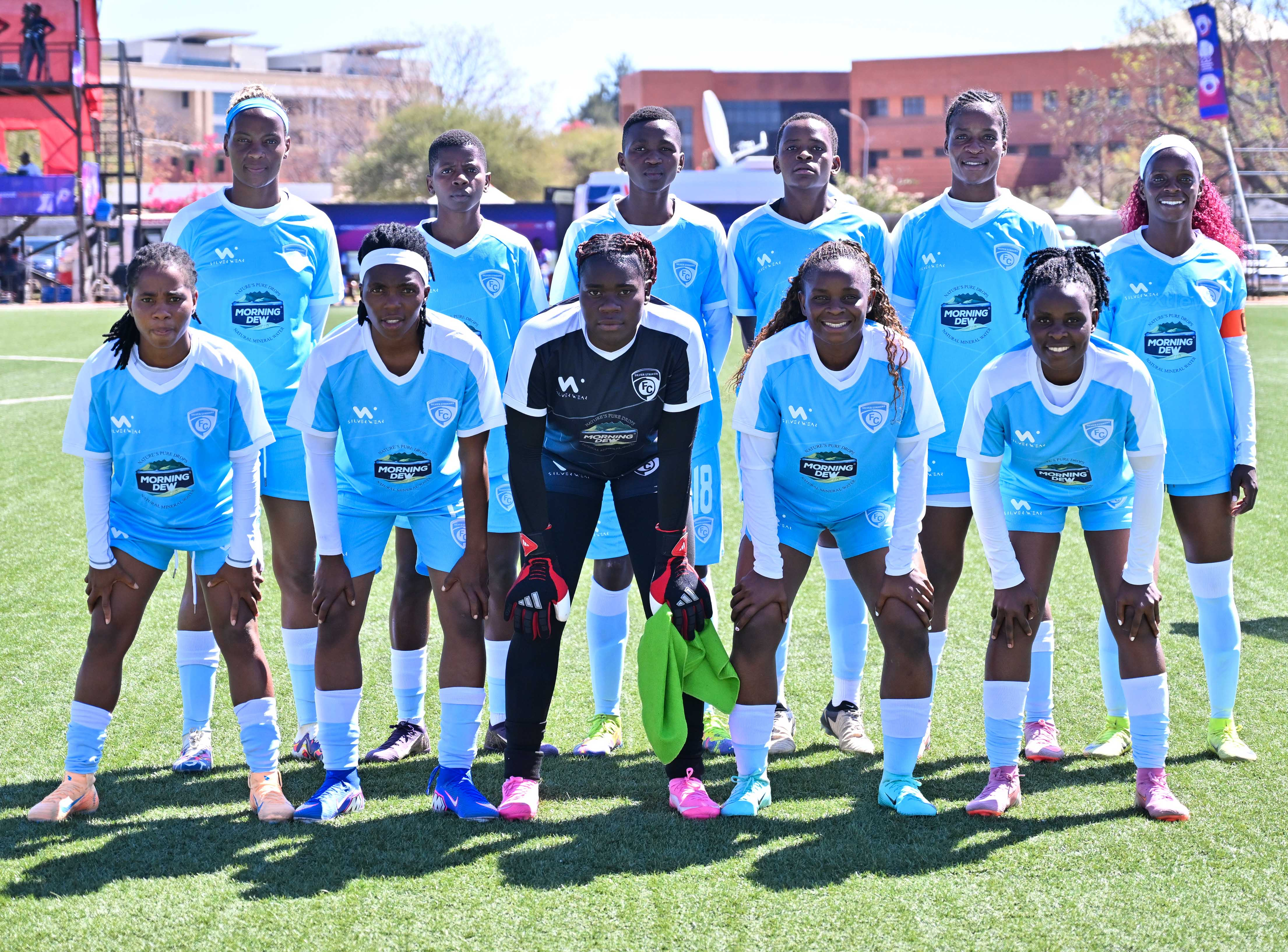
Silver Strikers starting eleven in 2026

She became the first choice goalkeeper for the Silver Strikers Ladies. She was goalkeeper of the tournament in 2025. when the Strikers had won the NBM Women's Premiership. As champions they qualified to complete at the CAF Women's Champions League in Gaborone, Botswana at the end of August 2026. Sibande was included in the final match's squad despite conceding seven goals in four matches. They finished fourth.

== International career ==
In April 2026 she was the first choice goalkeeper chosen by Maggie Chombo for the U20 National team to play Nigeria in the World Cup qualifiers. She was chosen together with fellow Silver Strikers Linda Manda and Grace Mkakangula. Sibande would feature in six matches in the campaign.

The national women's coach, Lovemore Fazili, chose Sibande for the national women's team. In June 2025 she was the first choice goalkeeper Fazili chose in a friendly match against Ghana.

Malawi's women's team competed at the Women's Africa Cup of Nations tournament (WAFCON) in Morocco where they secured a place in the FIFA Women's World Cup. However Sibande was not included in that squad.
