= Malawi women's national football team =

Women's association football team

Malawi
- Nickname: Scorchers
- Association: FAM
- Confederation: CAF
- Sub-confederation: COSAFA (Southern Africa)
- Head coach: (Malawi) Lovemore Fazili
- Captain: Tabitha Chawinga; Chisomo Kazisonga
- Top scorer: Tabitha Chawinga (35+)
- Home stadium: Bingu National Stadium
- FIFA code: MWI
First colours	Second colours

FIFA ranking
- Current: 104 ▲49 (October 20, 2026)
- Highest: 104 (October 20, 2026)
- Lowest: 159 (June – August 2023)

First international
- Zambia 8–0 Malawi (Harare, Zimbabwe; 20 April 2002)

Biggest win
- Malawi 17–0 Seychelles (Blantyre, Malawi; 25 September 2023); Malawi 17–0 Seychelles (Blantyre, Malawi; 28 September 2023)

Biggest defeat
- Zambia 8–0 Malawi (Harare, Zimbabwe; 20 April 2002)

World Cup
- Appearances: 1 (first in 2027)

Africa Cup of Nations
- Appearances: 1 (first in 2026)
- Best result: Runners-up (2026)
Medal record
Women's Africa Cup of Nations
Silver medal – second place	2026 Morocco

The Malawi women's national football team, nicknamed the Scorchers, represents Malawi in international women's association football. Established in the early 2000s and controlled by the Football Association of Malawi (FAM), the team qualified for the Women's Africa Cup of Nations for the first time in 2026, placing second. Its most notable achievements are winning the 2023 COSAFA Women's Championship and qualifying for the 2027 FIFA Women's World Cup.

== History ==
=== 2002–2010: Formation and early years ===
The Malawi women's national football team was established in the early 2000s, during a period when many African nations were forming women's teams. Malawi made its first appearance on the international stage in April 2002, participating in the inaugural COSAFA Women's Championship held in Harare, Zimbabwe. In their first official match on 20 April 2002, they were defeated 8–0 by neighboring Zambia. The team recorded its first victory in the following match, defeating Lesotho 3–0, before losing to the hosts in the final match of the tournament.

In 2004, Malawi took part in its first qualifying campaign for the African Women's Championship, advancing past Uganda by walkover before losing 9–0 on aggregate to Ethiopia. A second attempt in 2006 was unsuccessful, although the team earned its first point with a scoreless draw against Benin in the second leg. From that period until the 2010s, Malawi competed primarily at the regional level, participating in the COSAFA Women's Championship.

=== 2011–2018: Building phase ===
In 2011, during the fourth COSAFA Women's Championship, Malawi made history by qualifying for the semi-finals for the first time. However, losses to South Africa and Tanzania left the team in fourth place. The following year, Malawi participated in the African Women's Championship qualifiers and recorded its first-ever victory in a continental qualifying match by defeating Zambia 4–2, overturning a heavy first-leg defeat. The team then went on a three-year hiatus before returning in 2015, when they played a friendly against Tanzania. A similar situation occurred in 2016, with only a single match played throughout the year.

The return of the COSAFA Women's Championship in 2017, and its transition to an annual event, proved crucial in providing competitive matches for the She-Flames. Although the team was eliminated in the group stage in both 2017 and 2018, the number of games played tripled compared to the previous two years.

=== 2019–present: Breakthrough years ===
In 2019, Malawi participated in its first Olympic Games qualifying tournament, defeating Mozambique 11–1 and 3–0 across the two legs to advance to the first round. At that year's COSAFA Women's Championship, Malawi recorded two wins out of three matches, including a notable 13–0 victory against Comoros. Although the team was eliminated by Kenya in the first round of Olympic qualifying, their performance demonstrated significant progress.

In January 2020, the team's nickname was officially changed to "the Scorchers", distinguishing them from the men's team, known as "the Flames". Increased match experience led to improved results and a narrowing gap with top Southern African sides. In 2021, Malawi reached the final of the COSAFA Championship, narrowly losing to Tanzania. Later that year, the team participated in the 2022 WAFCON qualifiers, facing regional rivals Zambia; although Malawi was eliminated after the second-leg loss, the results reflected continued improvement.

In September 2023, as preparation for that year's regional tournament, Malawi played two friendly matches against Seychelles, winning both 17–0, marking their largest victories to date. During the tournament itself, Malawi went undefeated and captured their first COSAFA Women's Championship title, significantly raising the team's profile and paving the way for more fixtures. While they failed to defend their title in 2024, the federation arranged additional matches, and in 2025 the team played eight international friendlies, a record for the side. In October 2025, Malawi achieved a historic milestone by qualifying for the Women's Africa Cup of Nations for the first time, defeating Angola over a two-leg aggregate in the final qualifying round.

On August 9, 2026, the team were in Rabat in Morocco at the 2026 Women's Africa Cup of Nations. Temwa Chawinga had scored an equaliser against Ghana and Mercy Sikelo's goalkeeping was solid. Rose Kadzere scored Malawi's second goal, which won them a place in the semi-finals. More historically it earned a place for the Malawian team in the FIFA Women's World Cup. Malawi has never competed before at that level. Malawi joined Algeria, Morocco and Cameroon to qualify for the World Cup in Brazil; they were the lowest ranked national team to compete at either a men's or women's World Cup at FIFA rank 153.

The team made the final of the WAFCON competition where they were beaten by Cameroon. As runners-up the team won $750,000. Their debut run was lauded. The First Lady, Gertrude Mutharika, hosted a luncheon at the Kamuzu Presidential Palace on 20 August 2026, where she announced that each player was to receive 5 million kwacha from the President. Airtel also gave each player a router and a year of free data.

Attending the matches of the Scorchers was free. In October 2026 the teams ranking was changed from 153rd to 116th and supporters paid to see the team beat Zimbabwe 2-0 at Bingu National Stadium. The match raised 49 million kwacha which was just short of the tickets sold for a recent match by the male team, even though the tickets were half the price for the Scorchers.

== Coaching staff ==
As of July 2024

Role	Name
Head coach	(Malawi) Lovemore Fazili
Assistant coach	(Malawi) Maggie Chombo

=== Managers history ===
- Temwa Msuku (2012)
- Thom Mkorongo (2015)
- Maggie Chombo-Sadiki (2016–2018)
- Stuart Mbolembole (2018)
- Abel Mkandawire (2019)
- McNebert Kazuwa (2020–2021)
- Lovemore Fazili (2023–)

== Results and fixtures ==
The following is a list of match results in the last 12 months, as well as any future matches that have been scheduled.

Win Draw Lose Fixture

=== 2025 ===
23 October 2026 WAFCON qualifying	Angola	0–0	Malawi	Luanda, Angola
17:00 CAT		Report		Stadium: Estádio 11 de Novembro; Referee: Aline Umutoni (Rwanda)

28 October 2026 WAFCON qualifying	Malawi	2–0	Angola	Lilongwe
15:00 CAT	Chinzimu 82', 84'	Report		Stadium: Bingu National Stadium; Referee: Rachel Zihindula (DR Congo)
Note: Malawi won 2–0 on aggregate.

28 November 3 Nations Tournament	Zimbabwe	2–1	Malawi	Lilongwe
17:00 CAT	Chinyerere 3', 37'	Report	Chinzimu 40'	Stadium: Bingu National Stadium; Referee: Patricia Banda (Zambia)

30 November 3 Nations Tournament	Malawi	1–1	Zambia	Lilongwe
17:00 CAT	Kadzere 56'	Report	Nanyangwe 65'	Stadium: Bingu National Stadium

=== 2026 ===
18 February 2025 COSAFA Championship	South Africa	2–0	Malawi	Polokwane, South Africa
15:00 CAT	Holweni 63'; Mokoma 90+1'	Report		Stadium: Old Peter Mokaba Stadium; Referee: Anna Banda (Zambia)

21 February 2025 COSAFA Championship	Malawi	8–1	Lesotho	Polokwane, South Africa
15:30 CAT	Khumalo 4', 44'; Henry 10', 11', 45+2'; Chikupila 39'; V. Mkandawire 50'; Phikani 57'	Report		Stadium: Seshego Stadium; Referee: Laurinda Caluvi (Angola)

24 February 2025 COSAFA Championship	Angola	0–1	Malawi	Polokwane, South Africa
15:00 CAT		Report	Khumalo 77'	Stadium: Old Peter Mokaba Stadium; Referee: Anna Banda (Zambia)

11 April 2026 FIFA Series	Australia	5–0	Malawi	Nairobi, Kenya
13:00 CAT	Van Egmond 5'; Kerr 41'; Chidiac 60'; McNamara 86'; McKenna 90+4'	Report		Stadium: Nyayo National Stadium; Referee: Emmanuela Clement (South Sudan)

15 April 2026 FIFA Series	India	3–2	Malawi	Nairobi, Kenya
14:00 CAT	Oraon 19'; Singh 45+1'; Selladurai 84'	Report	Khumalo 43'; Henry 60'	Stadium: Nyayo National Stadium; Referee: Yordanos Mulugeta (Ethiopia)

3 June Friendly	Tanzania	1–0	Malawi	Dar es Salaam, Tanzania
15:00 CAT	Katunzi 48'	Report		Stadium: KMC Complex

6 June Friendly	Tanzania	0–0	Malawi	Dar es Salaam, Tanzania
15:00 CAT		Report		Stadium: KMC Complex

16 July Friendly	Morocco	2–1	Malawi	Rabat, Morocco
21:00 CAT				Stadium: Al Medina Stadium

28 July 2026 WAFCON	Nigeria	2–3	Malawi	Rabat, Morocco
22:00 CAT	Ajibade 90+2' (pen.); Kanu 90+9'	Report	Te. Chawinga 73', 90+5'; Ta. Chawinga 79'	Stadium: Al Medina Stadium; Referee: Aline Umutoni (Rwanda)

1 August 2026 WAFCON	Egypt	1–3	Malawi	Rabat, Morocco
19:00 CAT	Hassan 71'	Report	Kadzere 35'; Chinzimu 45+2'; Te. Chawinga 68'	Stadium: Moulay El Hassan Stadium; Referee: Awa Ilboudo (Burkina Faso)

5 August 2026 WAFCON	Malawi	1–2	Zambia	Rabat, Morocco
22:00 CAT	Ta. Chawinga 72'	Report (FIFA)	B. Banda 2'; Chilufya 37'	Stadium: Al Medina Stadium; Referee: Vincentia Amedome (Togo)

9 August 2026 WAFCON QF	Malawi	2–1	Ghana	Rabat, Morocco
21:00 UTC+0	Te. Chawinga 12'; Kadzere 79'	Report	Boye-Hlorkah 7'	Stadium: Al Medina Stadium; Referee: Shahenda El Maghrabi (Egypt)

12 August 2026 2026 WAFCON SF	Algeria	1–3	Malawi	Rabat, Morocco
18:00 UTC+0	Adjabi 60'		Ta. Chawinga 33', 76'; Te. Chawinga 45+1'	Stadium: Moulay El Hassan Stadium; Referee: Eunice Akintoye (Nigeria)

16 August 2026 2026 WAFCON Final	Cameroon	3–0	Malawi	Rabat
20:00	Ngah Manga 20', 45+3'; Eto 29'	Report (FIFA)		Stadium: Moulay El Hassan Stadium; Referee: Shahenda El Maghrabi (Egypt)

28 November Yongchuan International Tournament	Malawi	–	Albania	Chongqing, China
15:00 UTC+8				Stadium: Yongchuan Sports Center

1 December Yongchuan International Tournament	Thailand	–	Malawi	Chongqing, China
15:00 UTC+8				Stadium: Yongchuan Sports Center

4 December Yongchuan International Tournament	China	–	Malawi	Chongqing, China
19:35 UTC+8				Stadium: Yongchuan Sports Center

== Players ==
=== Current squad ===
The following players were called up for the 2026 Women's Africa Cup of Nations from July 26 to August 16 in Morocco.

No.	Pos.	Player	Date of birth (age)	Club
1	GK	Mercy Sikelo	December 22, 1997 (age 28)	(Football Association of Malawi) Civil Service United
23	GK	Esther Maulidi	February 3, 2008 (age 18)	(Football Association of Malawi) Mighty Wanderers Queens
16	GK	Yamikani Kaonga	October 11, 2004 (age 22)	(Football Association of Malawi) MDF Lioness
18	DF	Ireen Khumalo	December 12, 2003 (age 22)	(Football Association of Malawi) Silver Strikers Ladies
21	DF	Rose Alufandika	November 4, 2005 (age 21)	(Football Association of Malawi) Kukoma Ntopwa
2	DF	Olivia Phikani	July 20, 2006 (age 20)	(Football Association of Malawi) Kukoma Ntopwa
5	DF	Tionge Phiri	August 28, 2000 (age 26)	(Football Association of Malawi) Silver Strikers Ladies
22	DF	Benadetta Mkandawire	September 28, 2003 (age 23)	(Football Association of Malawi) FCB Nyasa Big Bullets
4	DF	Chimwemwe Madise	April 6, 1992 (age 34)	(Congolese Association Football Federation) TP Mazembe
14	DF	Maggie Chavula	April 28, 2005 (age 21)	(Football Association of Malawi) Ascent Soccer
	MF	Rose Kadzere	June 16, 2006 (age 20)	(French Football Federation) Montpellier
20	MF	Sara Mlimbika	January 11, 2007 (age 19)	(Football Association of Zambia) Green Buffaloes
	MF	Madyina Ngulube	June 18, 1996 (age 30)	(Football Association of Malawi) Silver Strikers Ladies
	MF	Leticia Chinyamula	June 12, 2006 (age 20)	(Football Association of Malawi) Ascent Soccer
	MF	Faith Chinzimu	February 21, 2007 (age 19)	(Swedish Football Association) BK Häcken
	MF	Chikondi Gondwe	September 16, 1998 (age 28)	(Football Association of Malawi) Silver Strikers Ladies
	FW	Vanessa Chikupira	April 2, 1996 (age 30)	(All India Football Federation) Gokulam Kerala
	FW	Mercy Vitumbiko Mkandawire	December 17, 2000 (age 25)	(Football Association of Zambia) Civil Service
	FW	Deborah Henry	September 28, 2004 (age 22)	(Football Association of Malawi) Silver Strikers
	FW	Asimenye Simwaka	August 8, 1997 (age 29)	(Football Association of Malawi) MDF Lioness
	FW	Sabina Thom	March 3, 1996 (age 30)	(Royal Moroccan Football Federation) Phoenix Marrakesh
11	FW	Tabitha Chaŵinga	May 22, 1996 (age 30)	(French Football Federation) Lyon
	FW	Temwa Chaŵinga	September 20, 1998 (age 28)	(United States Soccer Federation) Kansas City Current

=== Recent call-ups ===
The following players have been called up to a squad within the past 12 months.

Pos.	Player	Date of birth (age)	Caps	Goals	Club	Latest call-up
GK	Thoko Mwase		-	-	(Malawi) FCB Nyasa Big Bullets	v. Zambia, 30 November 2025
GK	Ireen Sibande		-	-	(Malawi) Silver Strikers Ladies	v. Zambia, 30 November 2025
DF	Maureen Kenneth		-	-	(Malawi) Ascent Soccer	v. Zambia, 30 November 2025
DF	Doreen Dickson	February 22, 2001 (age 25)	-	-	(Malawi) MDF Lioness	v. India, 15 April 2026
DF	Doreen Dickson	February 22, 2001 (age 25)	-	-	(Malawi) MDF Lioness	v. Angola, 24 February 2026
DF	Maureen Kenneth	October 28, 2007 (age 19)	-	-	(Malawi) Ascent Soccer	v. Angola, 24 February 2026
MF	Tendai Sani		-	-	(Zambia) ZISD	v. India, 15 April 2026
MF	Funny Magombo	April 5, 2005 (age 21)	-	-	(Malawi) Kukoma Ntopwa	v. Zambia, 30 November 2025
MF	Funny Moyo		-	-	(Malawi) Mighty Wanderers FC	v. Zambia, 30 November 2025
MF	Lyna James	December 23, 1998 (age 27)	-	-	(Malawi) FCB Nyasa Big Bullets	v. India, 15 April 2026
MF	Tendai Sani	January 11, 2004 (age 22)	-	-	(Zambia) ZISD	v. Angola, 24 February 2026
MF	Lyna James	November 23, 1998 (age 27)	-	-	(Malawi) FCB Nyasa Big Bullets	v. Angola, 24 February 2026
MF	Funny Magombo	April 5, 2005 (age 21)	-	-	(Malawi) Kukoma Ntopwa	v. Angola, 24 February 2026
FW	Catherine Kachala		-	-	(Malawi) MDF Lioness	v. Zambia, 30 November 2025
FW	Chisomo Banda		-	-	(Zambia) FCB Nyasa Big Bullets	v. India, 15 April 2026
FW	Sarah Mulimbika	January 11, 2007 (age 19)	-	-	(Malawi) Kukoma Ntopwa	v. India, 15 April 2026
FW	Mary Chavinda	December 27, 1998 (age 27)	-	-	(Malawi) FCB Nyasa Big Bullets	v. Angola, 24 February 2026
FW	Chisomo Banda	November 3, 2003 (age 23)	-	-	(Zambia) Konkola Blades Queens	v. Angola, 24 February 2026

=== Previous squads ===
COSAFA Women's Championship

- 2020 COSAFA Women's Championship squad
- 2022 COSAFA Women's Championship squad
- 2023 COSAFA Women's Championship squad

== Malawi records and statistics ==
- Malawi player sent off: - (2 times)
  - Sungeni Msiska - v South Africa, 6 July 2011 (44th minute)
  - Rose Alufandika - v Egypt, 1 August 2026 (52nd minute)
- Biggest win: 17 - (2 times)
  - v Seychelles, 25 September 2023
  - v Seychelles, 28 September 2023
- Biggest defeat: 8 - v Zambia, 20 April 2002
- Most appearances: 17 - Chimwemwe Madise - 2020–present
- Top goalscorer: 27 - Tabitha Chawinga - 2011–present
- Longest winning streak: 7 - from 25 September 2023 to 15 October 2023
- Longest unbeaten streak: 10 - from 25 September 2023 to 28 October 2024
- Longest losing streak: 4 - (2 times)
  - from 24 April 2002 to 19 February 2006
  - from 5 April 2025 to 21 June 2025
- Longest winless streak: 5 - (2 times)
  - from 24 April 2002 to 26 February 2006
  - from 11 April 2026 to 16 July 2026
- Longest goalless streak: 477 minutes - from 24 April 2002 to 23 August 2006
- Longest clean sheet streak: 371 minute - from 21 June 2025 to 28 November 2025
- Most goals in a match: 17 - (2 times)
  - v Seychelles, 25 September 2023
  - v Seychelles, 28 September 2023
- Most goals in first half: 9 v Seychelles, 28 September 2023
- Most goals in second half: 9 - v Seychelles, 25 September 2023
- Most goals by a player in a match: 8 - Linda Kasenda - v Comoros, 5 August 2019
- Most goals by a player in first half: 4 - Tabitha Chaŵinga - v Lesotho, 7 November 2020
- Most goals by a player in second half: 5 - Linda Kasenda - v Comoros, 5 August 2019
- Most conceded in a match: 8 - (2 times)
  - v Zambia, 20 April 2002
  - v Zimbabwe, 4 July 2011
- Most goals conceded in first half: 4 - v Zambia, 14 January 2012
- Most goals conceded in second half: 6 - v South Africa, 12 November 2020
- Most goals by both teams in a match: 17 - (2 times)
  - v Seychelles, 25 September 2023
  - v Seychelles, 28 September 2023
- Fewest goals by both teams in a match: 0 - (2 times)
  - v Benin, 26 February 2006
  - v Angola, 23 October 2025
- Fastest goals: 115 seconds - Zainabu Kapanda - v Lesotho, 7 November 2020
- Fastest goals by a opponent: 2nd minute - (2 times)
  - Noria Sosala - v Zambia, 14 January 2012
  - 106 seconds - Barbra Banda - v Zambia, 5 August 2026
- Fastest 2 goals: 0 minutes - (2 times)
  - v Comoros, 5 August 2019
  - v Lesotho, 7 November 2020
- Fastest 2 goals by a opponent: 1 minutes - (3 times)
  - v South Africa, 17 September 2018
  - v South Africa, 12 November 2020
  - v Mozambique, 1 October 2021
- Fastest 2 goals to start the match: 5th minute - v Lesotho, 7 November 2020
- Fastest 2 goals to start the match by a opponent: 4th minute - v Zambia, 14 January 2012
- Fastest 3 goals to start the match: 9th minute - v Seychelles, 28 September 2023
- Latest goals scored: 90+13th minute - Maureen Kenneth - v Mauritius, 28 October 2024
- Latest goals scored by a opponent: 90+9th minute - Uchenna Kanu - v Nigeria, 28 July 2026

== Competitive record ==
=== FIFA Women's World Cup ===
FIFA Women's World Cup record
Host	Result	Pld	W	D*	L	GF	GA	Coach
(China) 1991	Did not enter							
(Sweden) 1995	Did not enter							
(United States) 1999	Did not enter							
(United States) 2003	Did not enter							
(China) 2007	Did not qualify							
(Germany) 2011	Did not enter							
(Canada) 2015	Did not enter							
(France) 2019	Did not enter							
(Australia) (New Zealand) 2023	Did not qualify							
(Brazil) 2027	Qualified							
Total	1/10	—	—	—	—	—	—	

*Denotes draws include knockout matches decided via penalty shoot-out.

=== Olympic Games ===
(International Olympic Committee) Olympic Games record
Year	Result	Pld	W	D*	L	GF	GA	Coach
(United States) 1996	Did not enter							
(Australia) 2000	Did not enter							
(Greece) 2004	Did not enter							
(China) 2008	Did not enter							
(United Kingdom) 2012	Did not enter							
(Brazil) 2016	Did not enter							
(Japan) 2020	Did not qualify							
(France) 2024	Did not enter							
(United States) 2028	To be determined							
Total	0/9	—	—	—	—	—	—	

*Denotes draws include knockout matches decided via penalty shoot-out.

=== Africa Cup of Nations ===
Africa Cup of Nations record
Year	Result	Pld	W	D*	L	GF	GA	Coach
(Nigeria) 1998	Did not enter							
(South Africa) 2000	Did not enter							
(Nigeria) 2002	Did not enter							
(South Africa) 2004	Did not qualify							
(Nigeria) 2006	Did not qualify							
(Equatorial Guinea) 2008	Did not enter							
(South Africa) 2010	Did not enter							
(Equatorial Guinea) 2012	Did not qualify							
(Namibia) 2014	Did not enter							
(Cameroon) 2016	Did not enter							
(Ghana) 2018	Did not enter							
(Morocco) 2022	Did not qualify							
(Morocco) 2024	Did not enter							
(Morocco) 2026	Runners-up	6	4	0	2	12	10	Lovemore Fazili
Total:1/14	Runners-up	6	4	0	2	12	10	

=== African Games ===
African Games record
Year	Result	Pld	W	D*	L	GF	GA	Coach
(Nigeria) 2003	did not enter							
(Algeria) 2007	did not enter							
(Mozambique) 2011	did not enter							
(Republic of the Congo) 2015	did not enter							
(Morocco) 2019	See Malawi women's national under-20 football team							
(Ghana) 2023	See Malawi women's national under-20 football team							
(Egypt) 2027	To be determined							
Total:0/6	-	-	-	-	-	-	-	

=== COSAFA Championship ===
COSAFA Championship record
Year	Result	Pld	W	D*	L	GF	GA	Coach
(Zimbabwe) 2002	Group stage	3	1	0	2	3	14	
(Zambia) 2006	Group stage	2	1	0	1	3	3	
(Angola) 2008	Unknown							
(Zimbabwe) 2011	4th place	5	1	1	3	9	19	
(Zimbabwe) 2017	Group stage	3	1	1	1	12	12	Stewart Mbolembole
(South Africa) 2018	Group stage	3	1	0	2	2	8	Maggie Chombo-Sadiki
(South Africa) 2019	Group stage	3	2	0	1	16	3	Abel Mkandawire
(South Africa) 2020	Semi-finals	3	2	0	1	12	6	McNelbert Kazuwa
(South Africa) 2021	Runners-up	5	3	0	2	9	7	McNelbert Kazuwa
(South Africa) 2022	Group stage	3	1	1	1	8	4	Thom Mkolongo
(South Africa) 2023	Champions	5	5	0	0	19	6	Lovemore Fazili
(South Africa) 2024	Semi-finals	4	2	1	1	11	3	Lovemore Fazili
(South Africa) 2025	Group stage	3	2	0	1	9	3	Lovemore Fazili
Total	12/13	42	22	4	16	113	88	
