= Maggie Chavula =

Malawian footballer (born 2005)

Personal information
- Date of birth: 28 April 2005 (age 21)
- Position: Defender

Team information
- Current team: Ascent Academy (2026)

International career
Years	Team	Apps	(Gls)
- Malawi
Medal record
Women's Africa Cup of Nations
Silver medal – second place	2026 Morocco

Maggie Chavula is a Malawian footballer who plays as a defender for Ascent Soccer Academy and the Malawi women's national football team. In 2026, she was named in Malawi's 23-member squad for the Women's Africa Cup of Nations in Morocco, becoming part of the squad for the country's maiden appearance at the continental tournament.

== Early life and development ==
Maggie Chavula, then aged 18, was among the Ascent Soccer players who featured for the Malawi Senior Women's National Team during the 2023 COSAFA Women's Championship. She was part of the Scorchers squad as Malawi won the tournament for the first time in its history, defeating Zambia 2–1 in the final. The achievement marked an early milestone in Chavula's senior international career alongside fellow young Ascent players Rose Kabzere, Leticia Chinyamula and Faith Chinzumu.

== Club career ==
=== Ascent Soccer Academy ===
She was part of the Ascent side that competed in national women's competitions and helped establish the academy as one of the strongest teams in the country.

In 2024, Chavula was part of the Ascent side that represented Malawi in the COSAFA Women's Champions League qualifiers. During Ascent's opening match against Young Buffaloes of Eswatini, she featured in defence as the team secured a 2–1 victory.

In May 2024 Ascent Academy's youth team made the unprecedented occasion of winning a senior champion's league title. In June the National team invited the leading 30 footballing talents to a training camp. Rose Kadzere, Leticia Chinyamula, Faith Chinzimu and Alinafe Majora attended. However Chavula, Marium Mnenula and Maureen Kennet were busy with their exams so they missed on the event.

== International ==
She went to Morocco in 2026 as part of Malawi's squad at the biennial Women's Africa Cup of Nations. They were ranked 153rd and they were the rank outsiders. The team from Malawi included five Ascent Academy players including Chavula. Another of the five was Rose Kadzere and she scored the winning goal against Ghana which qualified the team for FIFA Women's World Cup in Brazil in 2027. The team made the WAFCON final where they were defeated 3:0 by Cameroon who became the champions at their fourth time in a WAFCON final.

As runners up the team won $750,000. The First Lady, Gertrude Mutharika, hosted a luncheon for the team at the Kamuzu Presidential Palace on 20 August. The First Lady announced that each player was to receive 5 million kwacha from the President.
