= Maggie Chombo-Sadiki =

Malawian football coach

Maggie Chombo
- Other name: Maggie Chombo-Sadicki
- Citizenship: Malawi
- Occupations: player and coach
- Known for: pioneer coach of women's football

Maggie Chombo or Maggie Chombo-Sadiki is a Malawian football coach and former player. She was the Malawi women's national football team coach from 2016 to 2018. She was the head coach of Blantyre Zero and the Nyasa Big Bullets Women's team. In 2020 she started to manage the national under-20 team.

== Life ==
In 2013 she was a coach and player with Blantyre Zero as women's football was emerging. She complained that women's teams were facing discrimination as the stadium owners would not let women's teams use their venues. Reasons offered for refusals were thought to be invented and the real reason was blamed on superstition as they thought the women would bring bad luck.

In 2016 she succeeded Thom Mkorongo as the National Women's Coach. She had a two year contract. In 2018 at the COSAFA Women's Championship her team had mixed results. They were beaten by Botswana 2-0 to Botswana but they beat the Madagascar team. Their match against South Africa ended with a 6-0 defeat. She was succeeded as coach by Stuart Mbolembole and she was one of his deputies until he resigned.

The Football Association of Malawi's General Secretary Alfred Gunda announced her as the Head Coach for the national Under 20 Women’s Football Team in January 2020. She was to prepare the team for the 2020 FIFA U20 Women’s World Cup qualifiers which began with a match against Zimbabwe. About ten days before that match she reduced the squad from 40 down to 25 players in order that they could better manage them.

In 2022 she was the head coach of the Nyasa Big Bullets Women's team. In December they had scored 90 goals and they were top of their league.

She has been learning more about coaching from Desiree Ellis in South Africa. At the end of 2023 she went to FIFA's headquarters in Zurich to graduate with a coaching qualification.

Chombo-Sadiki's national under-20 team beat the Central African Republic team in a match played at the Bingu National Stadium in a 3-1 win in May 2025. In January 2026 she named a 27 strong team to take part in the under-20 World Cup qualifiers. Six of then came from the Ascent Academy and five from Kukoma Ntopwa Women.
