= Malawi Women's League =

- Founded: 2020; 6 years ago
- Country: Malawi
- Confederation: CAF
- Number of clubs: 24
- Relegation to: W-League D2
- Domestic cup: W-Presidential Cup
- International cup: CAF W-Champions League
- Current champions: Ntopwa (2nd title) (2024–25)
- Most championships: Ntopwa (2 titles)

The Malawi Women's League called also Elite Women's League was the top flight of women's association football in Malawi in 2020. The competition was run by Malawi's National Women's Football Association which is a member association of the Football Association of Malawi. In 2025 a ten-club national women’s football league was unveiled sponsored by the National Bank of Malawi.

== History ==
Women's football was founded in 1998 in Blantyre. It was formed on first, a Blantyre Women's District League which later had becomes a Blantyre Women's Regional League and layer introduced in other regions. On 2020 was started the first Malawi women's League which is composed of three regions of eight teams each who split into Regional and National phases.

In July 2025 a ten-club national women’s premier football league was unveiled by Fleetwood Haiya sponsored by the National Bank of Malawi. The teams will be the top three teams from the three regions of Malawi with the tench place settled by competition. The initial set included FCB Nyasa Big Bullets Women, Ntopwa F.C., Moyale Sisters, MK Academy, Mighty Wanderers Queens (South); Ascent Soccer, Civil Service Women, Silver Strikers Ladies (Centre) and Topik Sisters (North)

== Champions ==
The list of champions and runners-up:

Year	Champions	Runners-up
2023	Ntopwa Women	Ascent Academy
2024	Ascent Academy	MDF Lionesses
2025	Ntopwa Women	
