= Esther Maulidi =

Malawian footballer (born 2008)

Personal information
- Date of birth: 3 February 2008 (age 18)
- Position: Goalkeeper

Team information
- Current team: Mighty Wanderers Queens

International career
Years	Team	Apps	(Gls)
- Malawi
Medal record
Women's Africa Cup of Nations
Silver medal – second place	2026 Morocco

Esther Maulidi (born 3 February 2008) is a Malawian professional footballer who plays as a goalkeeper for the Mighty Wanderers Queens and the Malawi women's national football team (the Scorchers).

== Club career ==
She plays club football for the Mighty Wanderers Queens in Malawi.

== International career ==
National coach Lovemore Fazili included Maulidi in the 23-woman Scorchers squad that played in the 2023 Hollywood Bets COSAFA Women's Championship that took place in Gauteng, South Africa. This was Maulidi's debut senior team call-up.

In 2024 Maulidi substituted for the main goalkeeper Mercy Sikelo during a COSAFA match against Mauritius that the Scorchers won nine to zero, the substitution was made at 90+6′.

Maulidi was included in the national team as a substitute goalkeeper during the Malawi National Women's Football Team debut appearance at the CAF Women's Africa Cup of Nations (WAFCON) 2026 tournament in Morocco. She was the youngest player in the squad at 18 years old. The team's coach Lovemore Fazili considered Maulidi to be a good goalkeeper although he preferred Mercy Sikelo's experience.

The team were ranked 153rd and they were the rank outsiders. The team's performance at WAFCON was described as the most "remarkable by an international team in a major tournament ever". The team made the WAFCON final where they were defeated 3:0 by Cameroon who became the champions at their fourth try in the WAFCON final in Rabat. All of the semi-finalists in the competition; Cameroon, Malawi,Algeria and Morocco will meet again in 2027 in Brazil - as they all qualified for the FIFA Women's World Cup.
