= Rose Alufandika =

Malawian footballer (born 2005)

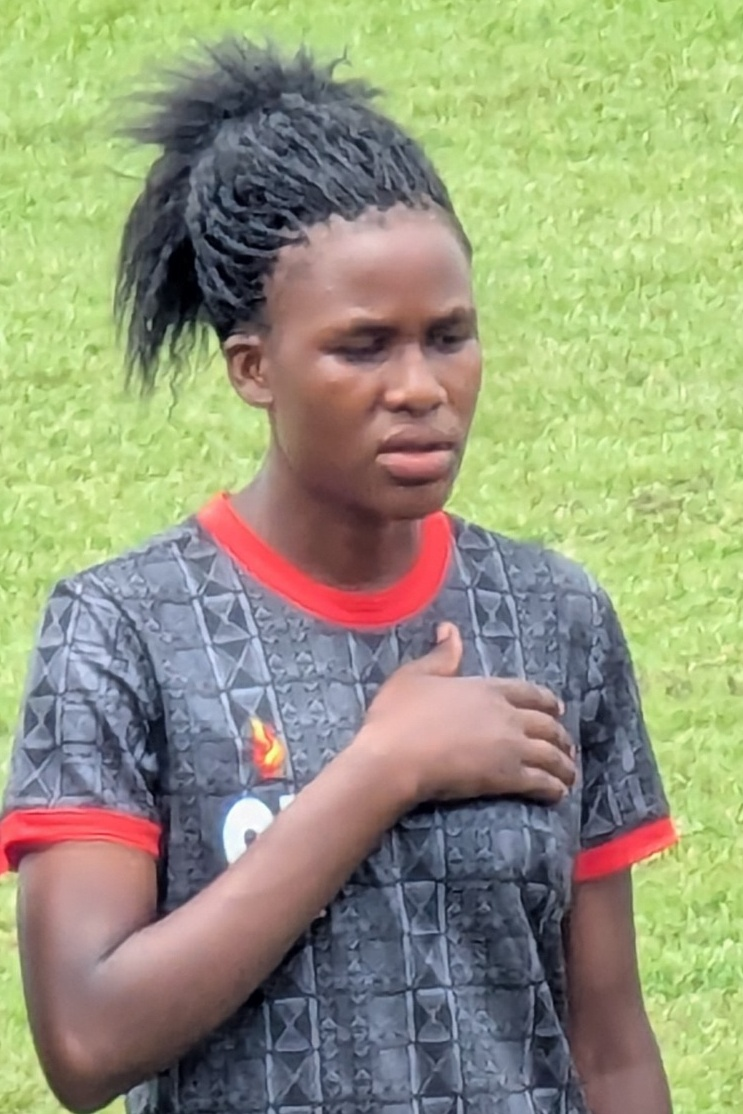
- Alufandika in 2025

Personal information
- Date of birth: 4 November 2005 (age 20)
- Position: Defender

Team information
- Current team: Kukoma Ntopwa

International career
Years	Team	Apps	(Gls)
- Malawi
Medal record
Women's Africa Cup of Nations
Silver medal – second place	2026 Morocco

Rose Alufandika (born 4 November 2005) is a Malawian professional footballer who plays for Malawi Women's League club Ntopwa and the Malawi national team.

== Club career ==
Alufandika plays club football domestically for the Blantyre-based side Ntopwa FC, also known as Kukoma Ntopwa and nicknamed the Ntopwa Queens.

Kukoma Ntopwa fared poorly during the 2025 CAF Women's Champions League COSAFA Qualifiers, losing their last group stage match against Zesco Ndola Girls, with a goal by Alufandika with just ten minutes to go.

== International career ==
Alufandika was one of the twenty-three-member squad for the Malawi National Women's Football Team's (Scorchers) debut at the 2026 Confederation of African Football (CAF) Women's Africa Cup of Nations (WAFCON); she was also one of the core team that played during the qualification campaign and international friendly matches ahead of the finals. Alufandika is a critical part of the Scorchers' defence strategy. They were ranked 153rd and they were the rank outsiders before play started.

Alufandika received a straight red card in the 51st minute of the match between the Scorchers and Egypt during WAFCON; the Scorchers went on to win the game despite playing with ten players after her expulsion. Her suspension also forced Malawi Coach Lovemore Fazili to replace his key defender for the WAFCON game against the Copper Queens of Zambia. The Zambian National Women's Team won the match against the Scorchers two to one but were eliminated from the WAFCON group stage after Nigeria defeated Egypt in the other Group C match; Malawi qualified for the knockout stage of WAFCON as well as for the 2027 FIFA Women's World Cup.

As runners up the team won $750,000. The First Lady, Gertrude Mutharika, hosted a luncheon for the team at the Kamuzu Presidential Palace on 20 August. The First Lady announced that each player was to receive 5 million kwacha from the President.
