= Ireen Khumalo =

Malawian footballer (born 2003)

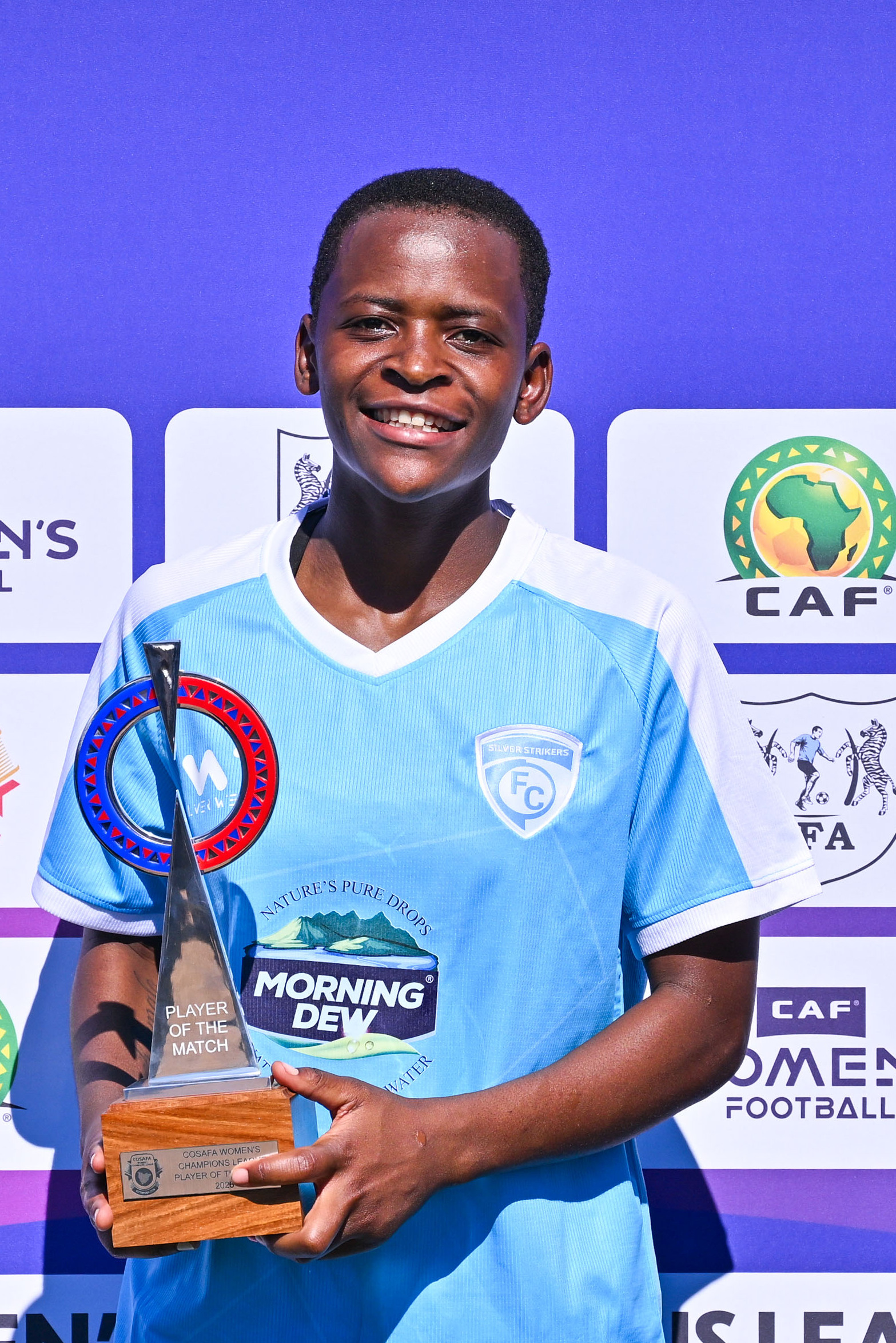
- Khumalo in August 2026

Personal information
- Date of birth: 12 December 2003 (age 22)
- Position: Defender

Team information
- Current team: Silver Strikers Ladies F.C.
- Number: 5

Senior career*
Years	Team	Apps	(Gls)
–	Ascent Academy		
2022–	Silver Strikers Ladies F.C.		
2024	→ Green Buffaloes Women F.C. (loan)		

International career
–	Malawi		
Medal record
Representing Malawi
Women's Africa Cup of Nations
Second place	2026 Morocco
- * Club domestic league appearances and goals

Ireen Khumalo (born 12 December 2003) is a Malawian professional footballer who plays as a defender for the Silver Strikers Ladies as well as the Malawi national women's football team. In 2026 the team's performance was described as the most "remarkable by an international team in a major tournament ever" after finishing as runners-ups in their maiden Women's Africa Cup of Nations tournament.

== Early life and education ==
Khumalo was one of the student-athletes from Ascent Academy; the academy has five players who have gone on to represent Malawi in the senior women's team, including Rose Kadzere. During her time at Ascent, Khumalo captained the Ascent Girls Squad, and in 2019 she travelled to the United States to attend Julie Foudy's Sports Leadership Academy camp.

== Club career ==
Khumalo joined Silver Strikers Ladies (formerly known as DD Sunshine) in 2022 and was part of the squad when the team made their debut appearance at the CAF Women's Champions League COSAFA Qualifier in Gaborone, Botswana.

In 2024, Khumalo joined Green Buffaloes Women in Zambia on loan from Silver Strikers Ladies for a year. Khumalo played as a midfielder for the Zambian club.

At the end of 2025, her club, Silver Strikers Ladies were recognised as the inaugural winners of the National Bank of Malawi (NBM) Women's Premiership. This was an outstanding win as there were still three games to be played but her club's lead made them unbeatable. The winning match was against Kukoma Ntopwa Women and they won by 4–0. Khumalo scored one of the winning goals at the Silver Stadium in Lilongwe.

== International career ==
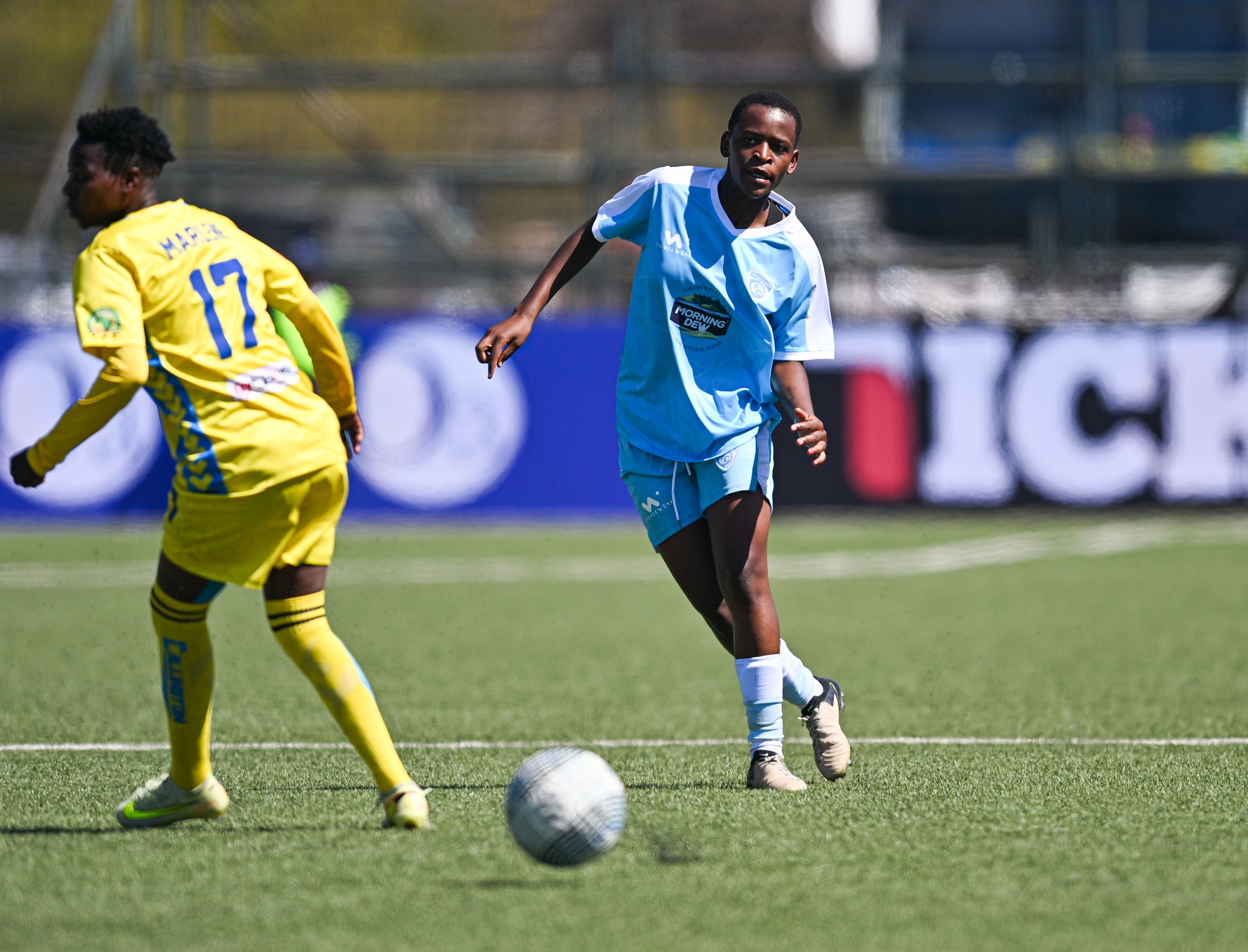
Ireen Khumalo in Gaborone, Botswana in 2026

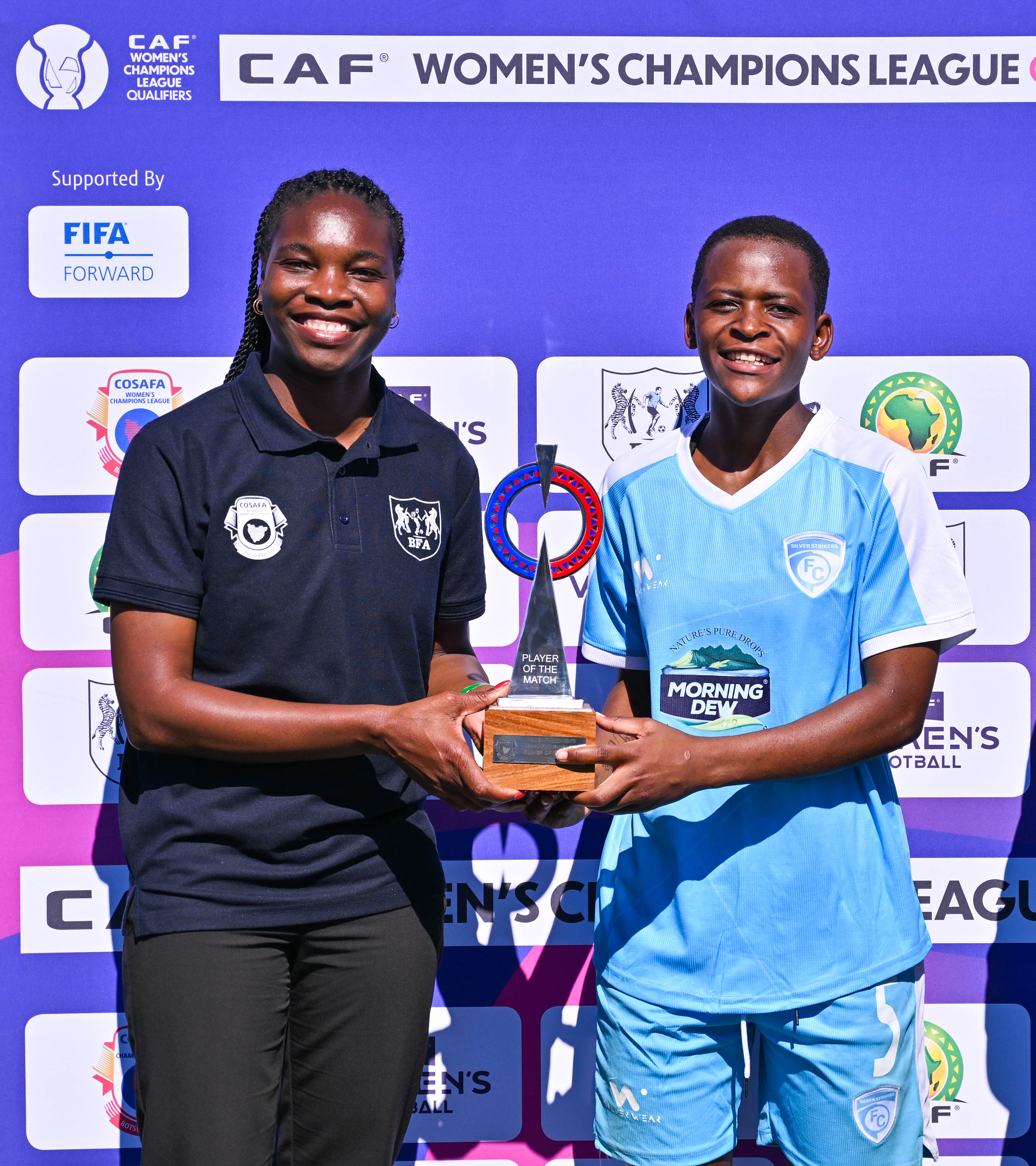
Khumalo of Silver Strikers receives player of the match from Irene Gocalves in Botswana on 21 August 2026

Khumalo emerged as a top scorer during the 2025 COSAFA Women's Championship in South Africa, where she and fellow Scorchers and Silver Strikers Ladies player Deborah Henry, scored 3 goals each during the tournament. Khumalo's strike helped the Scorchers beat Angola 1–0 during the championship.

Khumalo is one of the 23-member squad representing Malawi in their debut appearance at the 2026 Women's Africa Cup of Nations in Morocco. They were ranked 153rd and they were the lowest ranked team to reach the knockout stages after wins over favourites Nigeria. In the semi-final against Algeria they won 3–1, however Khumalo was given a yellow card. The team's performance at WAFCON was described as the most "remarkable by an international team in a major tournament ever". The team made the final where they were defeated 3–0 by Cameroon who became the champions at their fourth time in a WAFCON final.

In August 2026 Temwani Simwaka the NBS bank's CEO announced that they would be rewarding the Malawi women's national football team. The bank announced that it would pay 7 million kwacha direct into each player's bank account.
