= Mighty Wanderers Queens =

Malawian women's football team

The Mighty Wanderers Queens, previously known as the Bangwe Super Queens, are a women's football team in Malawi. They compete in the top tier of Malawian women's football, the National Bank of Malawi Women’s Football League. Based in Blantyre, they gained their current name when they were bought by Mighty Wanderers FC in 2023.

== History ==
In March 2023 the owners of Mighty Wanderers FC announced the acquisition of Bangwe Super Queens FC for an undisclosed sum. The acquisition ensured that the Mighty Wanderers men's team would be eligible to compete in the 2023 Confederation of African Football Interclubs tournament.

In May 2024 Mighty Wanderers Queens faced Civil Service Women in the Goshen FAM Women’s National Championship, competing to represent Malawi in the 2024 CAF Women's Champions League COSAFA Qualifiers.

In 2025 the Mighty Wanderers Queens were one of ten teams chosen to participate in the newly established national Women’s Football League sponsored by the National Bank of Malawi.

== Blantyre derbies ==
The team has a traditional rivalry with FCB Nyasa Big Bullets Women, another Blantyre team. Bullets won the fourth Women's Blantyre Derby in December 2024, with a 3-0 over Wanderers.

== National players ==
The Wanderers Queens goalkeeper is Esther Maulidi, who since 2023 has been included in the squad for the Malawi women's national football team.

In November 2024 several Wanderers Queens players were selected for the Malawi Under-17 national squad: Esther Maulidi, defender Chikondi Benjamin, midfielder Faluni Umali and striker Fatima Lali.
