= Agnes Kauzuu =

Namibian footballer (born 1992)

Personal information
- Date of birth: 22 December 1992 (age 33)
- Height: 1.61 m (5 ft 3 in)
- Position: Goalkeeper

Team information
- Current team: Tura Magic

Senior career*
Years	Team	Apps	(Gls)
- UNAM Bokkies FC
- Tura Magic

International career^{‡}
- Namibia
- * Club domestic league appearances and goals ‡ National team caps and goals as of 11 october 2014 (before the 2014 African Women's Championship)

Agnes Kauzuu (born 22 December 1992) is a Namibian footballer who plays as a goalkeeper for Namibia Women's Super League club Tura Magic FC and the Namibia women's national team. Nicknamed Mashaba, she was part of the team at the 2014 African Women's Championship. On club level she played for UNAM Bokkies FC in Namibia.
