= Faith Chinzimu =

Malawian footballer (born 2007)

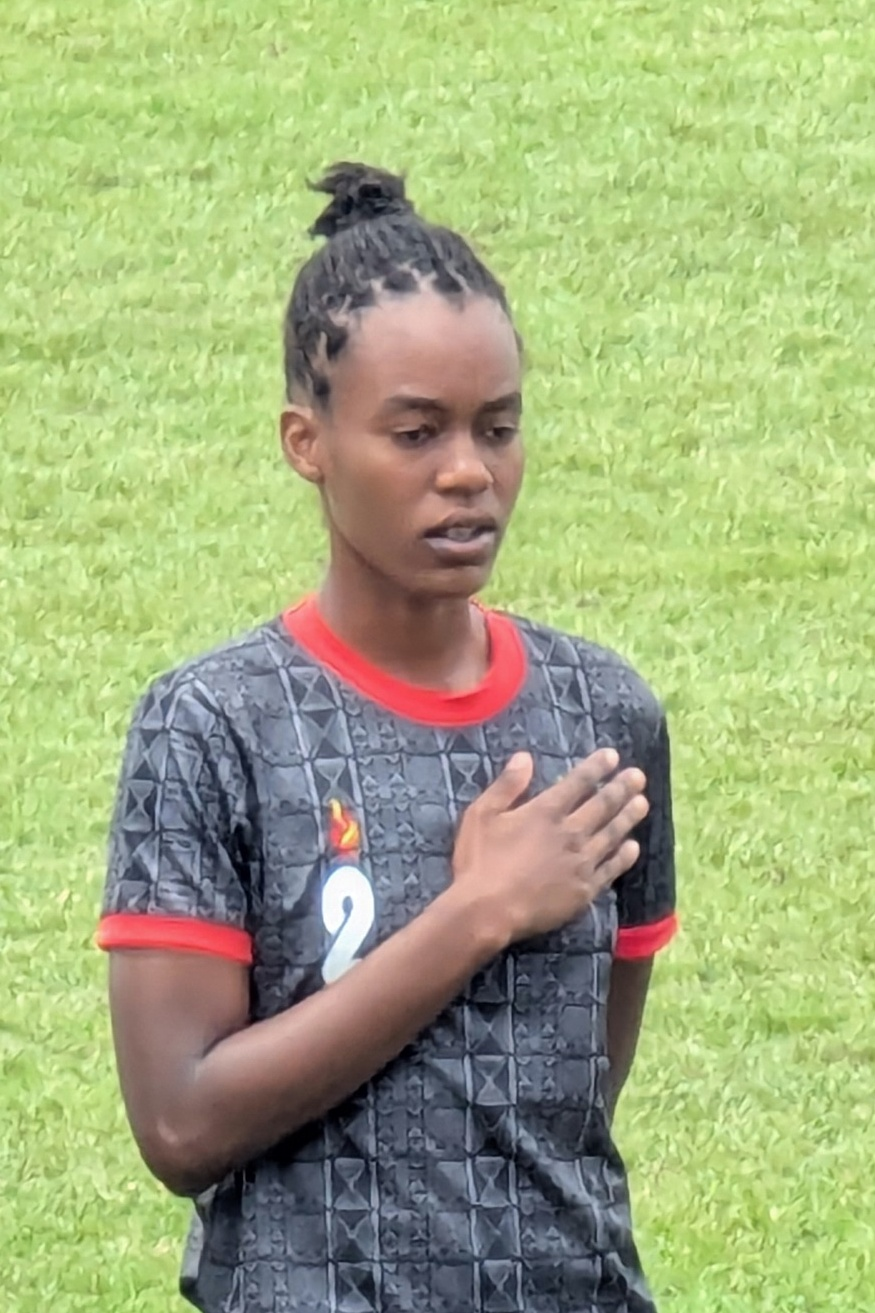
- in 2025

Personal information
- Date of birth: 12 February 2007 (age 19)
- Place of birth: Lilongwe, Malawi
- Height: 1.70 m (5 ft 7 in)
- Positions: Defender; midfielder

Team information
- Current team: BK Häcken FF
- Number: 17

Senior career*
Years	Team	Apps	(Gls)
–2025	Ascent Academy		
2025–	BK Häcken FF	1	(0)

International career^{‡}
2022–2024	Malawi U17	4	(7)
2025–	Malawi U20	1	(0)
2023–	Malawi	10	(2)
Medal record
Women's Africa Cup of Nations
Silver medal – second place	2026 Morocco
- * Club domestic league appearances and goals as of 2 August 2025 ‡ National team caps and goals as of 8 April 2025

Faith Chinzimu (Note: Also written as Faith Chizimu or Faith Chimzimu) (born 21 February 2007) is a Malawian professional footballer who plays as a defensive midfielder for Damallsvenskan club BK Häcken FF and the Malawi national team. She was in the squad that competed in the 2026 Women's Africa Cup of Nations where they went from debutantes to finalists. Chinzumu has been credited with getting the team to qualify for the Africa Cup cometition.

== Club career ==
Chinzimu started playing football with Lilongwe-based Ascent Academy, where she played a key role in securing the club's first domestic title in 2024. She also represented the team in the 2024 COSAFA Women's Champions League, her group stage tally of two goals secured her a place in the Group Stage Best XI. She played a key role in Ascent's title defence the following season, which resulted in a third-place finish.

By the spring of 2025, at the age of 18, Chinzimu underwent professional trials in Europe with Denmark's FC Nordsjælland, Sweden's UEFA Women's Champions League side Häcken, and Italy's AS Roma. In late July 2025, she officially joined Gothenburg-based club on a contract valid until 2028.

In 2026 her youth club Ascent Academy's teams were in Sweden and she arranged for them to play matches against her new club.

== International career ==
Chinzimu began her international career with Malawi at the under-17 level, featuring in the nation's first-ever team in that category during the 2022 COSAFA U-17 Women's Championship held on home soil. She scored seven goals throughout the tournament, finishing as the competition's second-highest goalscorer. In September 2023, She got her maiden call-up to the senior team for friendly matches against Seychelles. and made her debut on 25 September 2023 as a starter, in a 17–0 win in the first match. On 23 October 2024, She scored her first international goal against Botswana in the 2024 COSAFA Women's Championship opener. Chinzimu made her first appearance for the under-20 side in the second leg of the qualifiers against the Central African Republic.

The team were ranked 153rd and they were the rank outsiders at the 2026 Women's Africa Cup of Nations (WAFCON) in Rabat. The team's performance at WAFCON was described as the most "remarkable by an international team in a major tournament ever". Rose Kadzere was given a red card at the Women's Africa Cup of Nations when they were playing Algeria. Her role was taken up by Chinzumu for the final with Cameroon. They were defeated 3:0 by Cameroon who became the champions at their fourth try in the WAFCON final.

One commentator later summarised "how the Scorchers rewrote Malawi’s football story at WAFCON 2026". They noted that the amazing run had begun when the Scorchers qualified for the competition. They qualified for WAFCON in a match in October 2025 when Faith Chinzimu scored two goals against Angola in Lilongwe.

== Career statistics ==
=== International ===
As of match played 8 April 2025

Appearances and goals by national team and year
National team	Year	Apps	Goals
Malawi	2023	4	0
Malawi	2024	4	1
Malawi	2025	2	1
Total		10	2

:Scores and results list Malawi's goal tally first, score column indicates score after each Chinzimu goal.

List of international goals scored by Faith Chinzimu
No.	Date	Venue	Opponent	Score	Result	Competition
1	23 October 2024	Isaac Wolfson Stadium, iBhayi, South Africa	Botswana	1–0	1–1	2024 COSAFA Women's Championship
2	25 February 2025	REIZ Arena, Lusaka, Zambia	Zambia	2–1	3–2	Friendly
3	28 October 2025	Bingu National Stadium, Lilongwe, Malawi	Angola	1–0	2–0	2026 Women's Africa Cup of Nations qualification
4	28 October 2025	Bingu National Stadium, Lilongwe, Malawi	Angola	2–0	2–0	2026 Women's Africa Cup of Nations qualification
5	28 November 2025	Bingu National Stadium, Lilongwe, Malawi	Zimbabwe	1–2	1–2	Friendly
6	1 August 2026	Moulay El Hassan Stadium, Rabat, Morocco	Egypt	2–0	3–1	2026 Women's Africa Cup of Nations

== Honors ==
BK Häcken

- Damallsvenskan: 2025
- UEFA Women's Europa Cup: 2025–26
