= Mercy Sikelo =

Malawian footballer (born 1997)

Personal information
- National team: Malawi National Women's Football Team, The Scorchers
- Born: 22 December 1997 (age 28)

Sport
- Country: Malawi
- Sport: Football
- Position: Goalkeeper
- Club: Kukoma Ntopwa Women's FC, Civil Service United WFC (CIVO Ladies)

Mercy Sikelo (born 22 December 1997) is a Malawian professional footballer who plays as a goalkeeper for the Malawi women's national football team (the Scorchers). The team's performance was described as the most "remarkable by an international team in a major tournament ever" after finishing as runners-ups in their maiden Women's Africa Cup of Nations tournament and each player was awarded five million kwacha by Malawi's president.

== Club career ==
Sikelo was nominated for the COSAFA player of the tournament in 2024. Sikelo plays for Civil Service United WFC (CIVO Ladies) at Club level and previously played for Kukoma Ntopwa Women's FC.

== International career ==
The national coach, Lovemore Fazili, chose her for the national women's team in March 2026 for the Four Nations FIFA Series matches in Kenya. She was one of four players from the Kukoma Ntopwa Women team to be called up. The others were defenders Olivia Phikani and Rose Alufandika and midfielder Funny Magombo.

Sikelo played in Rabat, Morocco, with the Scorchers during their debut appearance at the 2026 Women's Africa Cup of Nations (WAFCON). They were ranked 153rd and they were the rank outsiders. The team's performance at WAFCOM was described as the most "remarkable by an international team in a major tournament ever".

During the match with Zambia, the Copper Queens captain, Barbara Banda, shot on goal, and Sikelo touched but did not clear the ball, resulting in the Zambian National Women's Football Team (the Copper Queens) scoring in the first two minutes of the match. The Scorchers went on to lose the match to Zambia by two goals to one, and Sikelo was targeted with abusive language and body-shaming online.

In the match against Ghana, Sikelo's goalkeeping helped the Scorchers secure a spot in the Women's Africa Cup of Nations (WAFCON) semifinals. Malawi also secured a place in the FIFA Women's World Cup; this will be the country's first appearance. Malawi joined Algeria, Morocco and Cameroon in qualifying for the 2027 games set to be played in Brazil. The team made the final where they were defeated 3:0 by Cameroon who became the champions at their fourth time in the WAFCON final.

As runners up the team won $750,000. The First Lady, Gertrude Mutharika, hosted a luncheon for the team at the Kamuzu Presidential Palace on 20 August. The First Lady announced that each player was to receive 5 million kwacha from the President.
