= Cynthia Shonga =

Zimbabwean footballer (born 2000)

Personal information
- Date of birth: 18 June 2000 (age 26)
- Position: Goalkeeper

Team information
- Current team: Harare City

Senior career*
Years	Team	Apps	(Gls)
- Harare City

International career^{‡}
2020–	Zimbabwe	3+	(0+)
- * Club domestic league appearances and goals ‡ National team caps and goals as of 4 October 2021.

Cynthia Shonga (born 18 June 2000) is a Zimbabwean footballer who plays as a goalkeeper for Harare City Queens FC and the Zimbabwe women's national team.

== Club career ==
Shonga began playing football at the age of 11. She played for Harare City in Zimbabwe.

== International career ==
Shonga capped for Zimbabwe at senior level during two COSAFA Women's Championship editions (2020 and 2021).
