= Judith Soko =

Zambian footballer (born 2004)

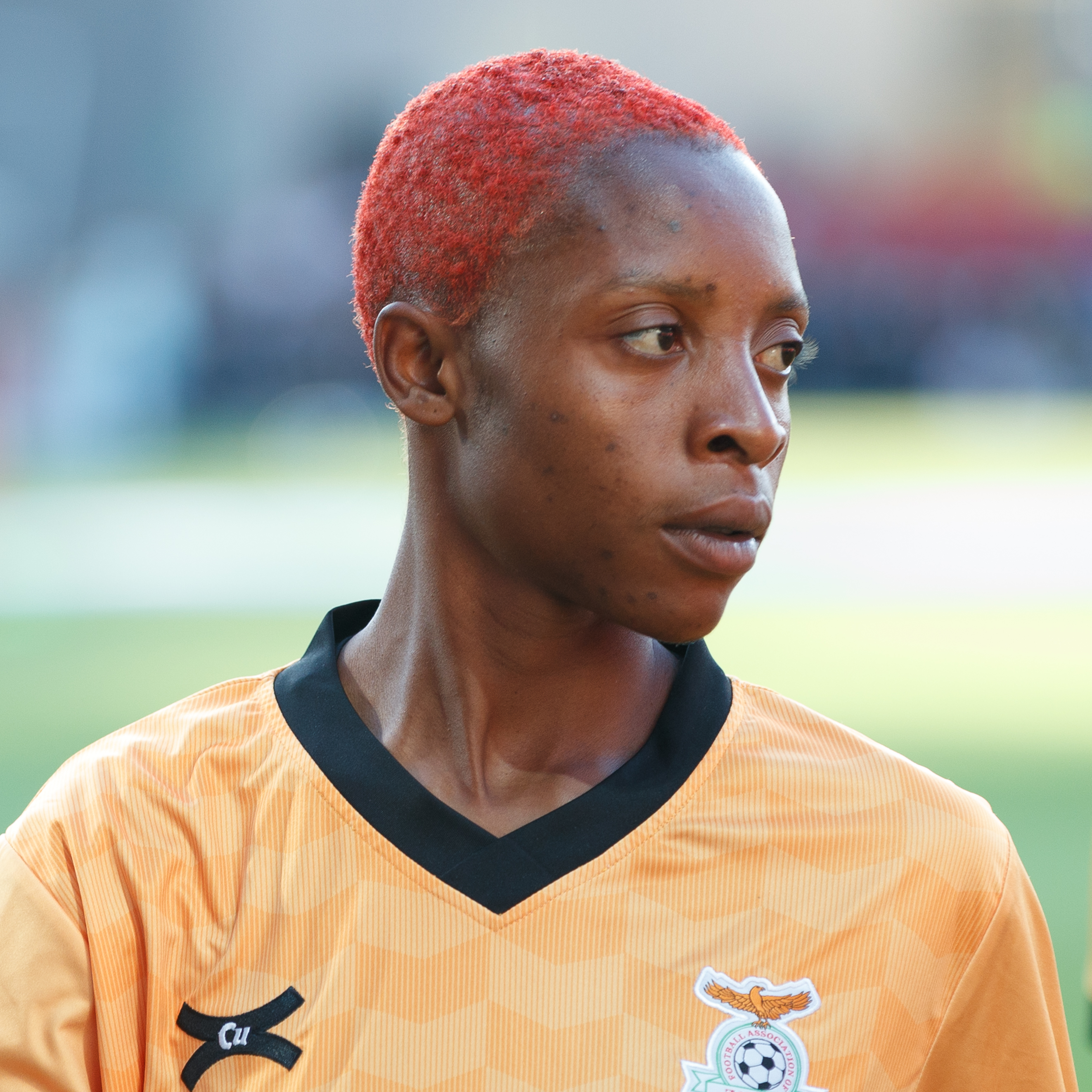

Personal information
- Date of birth: 31 March 2004 (age 22)
- Place of birth: Zambia
- Height: 1.55 m (5 ft 1 in)
- Position: Defender

Team information
- Current team: YASA Queens

International career^{‡}
Years	Team	Apps	(Gls)
2023–	Zambia	2	(0)
- ‡ National team caps and goals as of 20 July 2023

Judith Soko (born 31 March 2004) is a Zambian footballer who plays as a defender for YASA Queens and the Zambia women's national football team. She has appeared in two friendly international matches for Zambia; while she was a member of the squad which competed in the 2022 Women's Africa Cup of Nations, she did not compete in the tournament. She was named to the Zambian squad for the 2023 FIFA Women's World Cup.

== Honours ==
Zambia

- COSAFA Women's Championship: 2022
