= Lovemore Fazili =

Malawian football coach

Personal information
- Full name: Lovemore Kingsley Fazili
- Date of birth: 12 February 1970 (age 56)
- Position: Forward

Team information
- Current team: Malawi Women

Senior career*
Years	Team	Apps	(Gls)
–	Silver Strikers FC		

Managerial career
- 2016–2016: Silver Strikers FC
- 2023–: Malawi Women
- * Club domestic league appearances and goals

Lovemore Kingsly Fazili (born 12 February 1970) is Malawian professional football manager and former player who is coach of the Malawi women's national football team. That team's performance at the Women's Africa Cup of Nations (WAFCON) in 2026 was described as the most "remarkable by an international team in a major tournament ever".

== Career ==
Fazili was a professional footballer credited with five FIFA goals over thirteen matches.

Fazili coached Silver Strikers in the Super League of Malawi from 2016 to 2017.

In 2023, he took charge of the Malawi women’s national football team, guiding the Scorchers to their first-ever COSAFA Women’s Championship title. In 2026, he led the team to another historic milestone by securing qualification for their maiden Women’s Africa Cup of Nations in Morocco.

The team were ranked 153rd and they were the rank outsiders at the 2026 Women's Africa Cup of Nations (WAFCON) in Rabat. However they won matches. The team's performance at WAFCON was described as the most "remarkable by an international team in a major tournament ever". They reached the final after a 3–1 victory over Algeria. Rose Kadzere was given a red card and Faith Chinzimu covered her role for the final with Cameroon. where they were defeated 3:0. Cameroon became the champions at their fourth time in the WAFCON final.

== Honours ==
Manager

- COSAFA Women's Championship: 2023
