= Ntopwa F.C. (women) =

Ntopwa Ladies
- Full name: Kukoma Ntopwa
- Ground: Kamuzu Stadium
- League: Malawi Women's League
- 2024–25: 1st

Ntopwa F.C., also known as Kukoma Ntopwa and nicknamed the Ntopwa Queens, is a Malawian women's football club in Blantyre who plays in the Malawi Women's League, the top tier of Malawian women's football.

== History ==
=== COSAFA Women's Champions League ===
They made their debut in the COSAFA Women's Champions League in the 2023 edition. They opened their account with a 1-all draw against Lesotho Defence Force from Lesotho. The next match was a 1–0 loss to Green Buffaloes from Zambia. Their final match was a 4–0 loss to Double Action from Botswana.

They made their second appearance in the regional qualifiers at the 2025 COSAFA Women's Champions League with a 3–0 loss to Mamelodi Sundowns from South Africa. Their next match was 3–0 to Beauties F.C. from Namibia. Their final group match was a 5–3 loss to ZESCO Ndola Girls from Zambia as they finished bottom of Group A.

== Honours ==
- Malawi Women's League: 2022/23, 2024/25

== Team Statistics ==
=== COSAFA Women's Champions League record ===
Season	Pos	Record						
Season	Pos	P	W	D	L	F	A	GD
2023	Group Stage	3	0	1	2	1	6	(5)
2025	Group Stage	3	0	0	3	3	11	(8)

- Biggest win: no win
- Heaviest defeat: 0-4 vs Double Action Ladies (2023)
- Highest scoring match: 5-3 vs ZESCO Ndola Girls (2025)
- Most goals scored in a competition: 3 (2025)
- Most goals conceded in a competition: 11 (2025)

== See also ==
- Mercy Sikelo, goalkeeper
