= Rose Kadzere =

Malawian footballer (born 2006)

Personal information
- Full name: Rose Smith Kadzere
- Date of birth: 16 June 2006 (age 20)
- Place of birth: Lilongwe, Malawi
- Height: 1.65 m (5 ft 5 in)
- Position: Midfielder

Team information
- Current team: Montpellier
- Number: 99

Youth career
- –2024: Ascent Academy

Senior career*
Years	Team	Apps	(Gls)
2024–	Montpellier	13	(3)
2024	Montpellier B	1	(1)

International career^{‡}
2022	Malawi U17	4	(8)
2022	Malawi U20	2	(1)
2021–	Malawi	11	(3)
Medal record
Women's Africa Cup of Nations
Silver medal – second place	2026 Morocco
- * Club domestic league appearances and goals as of 29 March 2025 ‡ National team caps and goals as of 15 October 2023

Rose Smith Kadzere (born 16 June 2006) is a Malawian professional footballer who plays as a midfielder for Première Ligue club Montpellier and the Malawi national team.

In 2026 she scored the winning goal against Ghana which qualified Malawi to the 2027 FIFA Women's World Cup.

== Club career ==
Kadzere learnt her skills at the Ascent Soccer Academy.

=== Montpellier (2024–present) ===
On October 3, 2024, at 18 years old, Kadzere became the first Malawian, male or female, to transfer directly to one of Europe's top five leagues, joining Montpellier in the French Première Ligue from Ascent Academy in Malawi. On October 16, 2024, she made her debut for the reserve team in the Division 3 Féminine, scoring her first goal in the 60th minute to level the score in a 2–2 draw against Le Puy Foot 43 Auvergne. On November 2, 2024, she made her Première Ligue debut for the first team in a 7–0 victory over EA Guingamp, coming on as a substitute for Ifeoma Onumonu in the 70th minute and scoring her first goal eleven minutes later.

== International career ==
Kadzere is a Malawian youth and senior international. In November 2022, she was selected for Malawi's first-ever under-17 team to compete on the international stage at the 2022 COSAFA U-17 Women's Championship, held on home soil. With 8 goals throughout the tournament, she was named the championship's top scorer. In April 2024, She was nominated for the COSAFA Women's Most Promising Player Award.

In September 2023, she was called up to the senior team for the 2023 COSAFA Women's Championship. On September 25, 2023, she scored her second goal for the team in a historic 17–0 victory against Seychelles. She and the team went on to secure the championship, marking Malawi's first women's trophy.

In 2026 she was in Rabat in Morocco with the national team at the 2026 Women's Africa Cup of Nations. Temwa Chawinga had scored an equaliser against Ghana and Mercy Sikelo's goalkeeping was solid. Kadzere scored Malawi's second goal which won them a place in the semi-finals. More historically it earned a place for the Malawian team in the 2027 World Cup. Malawi has never competed before at that level. Malawi joined Algeria, Morocco and Cameroon to qualify for the 2027 Women's World Cup in Brazil.

== Career statistics ==
=== International ===
As of match played February 25, 2025

Appearances and goals by national team and year
National team	Year	Apps	Goals
Malawi	2021	2	0
Malawi	2022	3	1
Malawi	2023	6	2
Malawi	2025	2	1
Total		13	4

Scores and results list Malawi's goal tally first, score column indicates score after each Kadzere goal.

List of international goals scored by Rose Kadzere
No.	Date	Location	Opponent	Score	Result	Competition	Ref.
1	September 5, 2022	Port Elizabeth, South Africa	Comoros	2–0	6–0	2022 COSAFA Women's Championship	
2	September 25, 2023	Blantyre, Malawi	Seychelles	2–0	17–0	Friendly	
3	October 7, 2023	Johannesburg, South Africa	Eswatini	4–0	8–0	2023 COSAFA Women's Championship	
4	February 25, 2025	Lusaka, Zambia	Zambia	1–1	3–2	Friendly	
5	19 June 2025	Kenitra, Morocco	Morocco	2–0	2–4	Friendly	
5	30 November 2025	Lilongwe, Malawi	Zambia	1–0	1–1	Friendly	
6	1 August 2026	Rabat, Morocco	Egypt	1–0	3–1	2026 Women's Africa Cup of Nations	
7	9 August 2026	Rabat, Morocco	Ghana	1–0	2–1	2026 Women's Africa Cup of Nations	

== Honors ==
Malawi

- COSAFA Women's Championship: 2023

Individual

- COSAFA U-17 Women's Championship Top Scorer: 2022
