= Ascent Academy =

- Founded: 2015; 11 years ago
- Coordinates: 13.946°S 33.725°E
- Website: facebook

Ascent Soccer is a Malawian football academy and club. It was founded in 2015 and several leading international players are alumni.

== History ==
It was founded in 2015, and it was originally named the Chigoli Academy. One of the co-founders, George Maguire had been an aspiring footballer in the UK. He moved to Malawi in 2008 where his father ran an agricultural company. Maguire's ambition was for Malawi to create footballers of the quality associated at that time with Senegal and the Ivory Coast.

The academy started with £300 and ambition. The academy's success story is associated with the Chawinga sisters who were discovered at DD Sunshine and now both play for foreign sides. Maguire believes that achievements in the women's game are easier because the sport is still developing. No other academy in Malawi awards its young players scholarships. 40,000 young players apply in the hope of joining the academy programme of 65 players.

In 2024 the Ascent Academy's team won the Senior Women’s National Championship in Malawi when the average age of the team was eighteen under coach Thom Mkolongo.

In 2024 the academy claimed to have created 30 players who had gone on to play for national teams. Rose Kadzere learnt her skills at the Ascent Soccer Academy and in 2025 she moved to play for Montpellier. Other alumni include Alinafe Majora, Faith Chinzimu, Leticia Chinyamula, Maggie Chavula and Ireen Khumalo.

The academy has boys and girls teams and in July 2026 they were competing in Sweden at the Gothia Cup.
