= Football at the 2020 Summer Olympics – Women's tournament – Group F =

Football at the Olympics

Group F of the women's football tournament at the 2020 Summer Olympics was played from 21 to 27 July 2021 and included Brazil, China PR, the Netherlands and Zambia. The top two teams, the Netherlands and Brazil, advanced to the knockout stage.

== Teams ==
Draw position	Team	Pot	Confederation	Method of qualification	Date of qualification	Olympic appearance	Last appearance	Previous best performance	FIFA Rankings	
Draw position	Team	Pot	Confederation	Method of qualification	Date of qualification	Olympic appearance	Last appearance	Previous best performance	April 2021 (Note: The rankings of April 2021 were used for seeding for the final draw.)	June 2021
F1	China	3	AFC	2020 AFC Women's Olympic Qualifying Tournament play-off round winners	13 April 2021	6th	2016	Silver medalists (1996)	14	15
F2	Brazil	2	CONMEBOL	2018 Copa América Femenina 1st place	22 April 2018	7th	2016	Silver medalists (2004, 2008)	7	7
F3	Zambia	4	CAF	2020 CAF Women's Olympic Qualifying Tournament winners	10 March 2020	1st	—	Debut	104	104
F4	Netherlands	1	UEFA	2019 FIFA Women's World Cup 1st place European team	29 June 2019	1st	—	Debut	3	4

== Standings ==
Pos	Team	Pld	W	D	L	GF	GA	GD	Pts	Qualification
1	Netherlands	3	2	1	0	21	8	+13	7	Advance to knockout stage
2	Brazil	3	2	1	0	9	3	+6	7	Advance to knockout stage
3	Zambia	3	0	1	2	7	15	−8	1	
4	China	3	0	1	2	6	17	−11	1	

Source: TOCOG and FIFA
Rules for classification: Group stage tiebreakers

In the quarter-finals,

- The winners of Group F, the Netherlands, advanced to play the runners-up of Group G, the United States.
- The runners-up of Group F, Brazil, advanced to play the runners-up of Group E, Canada.

== Matches ==
=== China PR vs Brazil ===
21 July 2021
17:00

China	0–5	Brazil
	Report (TOCOG); Report (FIFA)	Marta 9', 74'; Debinha 22'; Andressa 82' (pen.); Beatriz 89'

Miyagi Stadium, Rifu
Attendance: 1,645
Referee: Kateryna Monzul (Ukraine)

China PR	Brazil

GK	12	Peng Shimeng
RB	17	Luo Guiping
CB	13	Yang Lina
CB	16	Wang Xiaoxue
LB	2	Li Mengwen
RM	7	Wang Shuang
CM	8	Wang Yan	(substituted off) 33'
CM	4	Li Qingtong
LM	6	Zhang Xin	(substituted off) 84'
CF	11	Wang Shanshan (c)
CF	9	Miao Siwen	(substituted off) 84'
Substitutions:
FW	18	Wurigumula	(substituted on) 33'
FW	20	Xiao Yuyi	(substituted on) 84'
MF	14	Liu Jing	(substituted on) 84'
Manager:
Jia Xiuquan

GK	1	Bárbara
RB	13	Bruna
CB	3	Érika
CB	4	Rafaelle
LB	6	Tamires
RM	7	Duda	(substituted off) 59'
CM	8	Formiga	(substituted off) 72'
CM	17	Andressinha
LM	9	Debinha
CF	16	Beatriz
CF	10	Marta (c)	(substituted off) 83'
Substitutions:
FW	21	Andressa	(substituted on) 59'
MF	5	Julia	(substituted on) 72'
FW	12	Ludmila	(substituted on) 83'
Manager:
(Sweden) Pia Sundhage

Assistant referees:
Lucie Ratajová (Czech Republic)
Maryna Striletska (Ukraine)
Fourth official:
Stéphanie Frappart (France)
Video assistant referee:
Guillermo Cuadra Fernández (Spain)
Assistant video assistant referee:
Benoît Millot (France)

=== Zambia vs Netherlands ===
This was the highest-scoring women's football match ever at the Olympic Games, with the Netherlands' tally of ten goals is also a women's Olympic record. It was also the highest-scoring match at the Olympics since 1928, when Italy beat Egypt 11–3 in the men's bronze medal match in Amsterdam.

21 July 2021
20:00

Zambia	3–10	Netherlands
Banda 19', 82', 83'	Report (TOCOG); Report (FIFA)	Miedema 9', 15', 29', 59'; Martens 14', 38'; Van de Sanden 44'; Roord 64'; Beerensteyn 75'; Pelova 80'

Miyagi Stadium, Rifu
Attendance: 1,822
Referee: Laura Fortunato (Argentina)

Zambia	Netherlands

GK	16	Hazel Nali
RB	8	Margaret Belemu		(substituted off) 87'
CB	5	Anita Mulenga		(substituted off) 72'
CB	3	Lushomo Mweemba
LB	4	Esther Siamfuko	(yellow card) 66'
CM	14	Ireen Lungu
CM	6	Mary Wilombe
RW	12	Avell Chitundu
AM	10	Grace Chanda
LW	11	Barbra Banda (c)
CF	9	Hellen Mubanga		(substituted off) 73'
Substitutions:
MF	15	Agness Musase		(substituted on) 72'
FW	7	Lubandji Ochumba		(substituted on) 73'
DF	20	Esther Mukwasa		(substituted on) 87'
Manager:
Bruce Mwape

GK	1	Sari van Veenendaal (c)
RB	17	Dominique Janssen
CB	3	Stefanie van der Gragt		(substituted off) 60'
CB	4	Aniek Nouwen		(substituted off) 86'
LB	5	Merel van Dongen
CM	10	Daniëlle van de Donk		(substituted off) 72'
CM	14	Jackie Groenen
CM	6	Jill Roord
RF	7	Shanice van de Sanden		(substituted off) 72'
CF	9	Vivianne Miedema		(substituted off) 60'
LF	11	Lieke Martens
Substitutions:
DF	2	Lynn Wilms		(substituted on) 60'
FW	18	Lineth Beerensteyn		(substituted on) 60'
MF	13	Victoria Pelova		(substituted on) 72'
FW	19	Renate Jansen		(substituted on) 72'
DF	15	Kika van Es	(yellow card) 90'	(substituted on) 86'
Manager:
Sarina Wiegman

Assistant referees:
Mariana De Almeida (Argentina)
Mary Blanco (Colombia)
Fourth official:
Esther Staubli (Switzerland)
Video assistant referee:
Mauro Vigliano (Argentina)
Assistant video assistant referee:
Nicolás Gallo (Colombia)

=== China PR vs Zambia ===
24 July 2021
17:00

China	4–4	Zambia
Wang Shuang 6', 22', 23', 84' (pen.)	Report (TOCOG); Report (FIFA)	Kundananji 15'; Banda 43' (pen.), 46', 69'

Miyagi Stadium, Rifu
Attendance: 2,212
Referee: Melissa Borjas (Honduras)

China PR	Zambia

GK	12	Peng Shimeng
RB	2	Li Mengwen
CB	4	Li Qingtong	(red card) 86'
CB	16	Wang Xiaoxue
LB	17	Luo Guiping
RM	7	Wang Shuang
CM	13	Yang Lina
CM	9	Miao Siwen		(substituted off) 65'
LM	6	Zhang Xin		(substituted off) 65'
CF	15	Yang Man		(substituted off) 34'
CF	11	Wang Shanshan (c)
Substitutions:
FW	18	Wurigumula		(substituted on) 34'
MF	14	Liu Jing		(substituted on) 65'
FW	20	Xiao Yuyi		(substituted on) 65'
Manager:
Jia Xiuquan

GK	16	Hazel Nali
RB	17	Racheal Kundananji
CB	15	Agness Musase
CB	3	Lushomo Mweemba	(yellow card) 83'
LB	4	Esther Siamfuko		(substituted off) 62'
CM	14	Ireen Lungu
CM	6	Mary Wilombe		(substituted off) 38'
RW	12	Avell Chitundu
AM	10	Grace Chanda
LW	7	Lubandji Ochumba		(substituted off) 77'
CF	11	Barbra Banda (c)
Substitutions:
DF	13	Martha Tembo		(substituted on) 38'
DF	8	Margaret Belemu		(substituted on) 62'
FW	9	Hellen Mubanga		(substituted on) 77'
Manager:
Bruce Mwape

Assistant referees:
Shirley Perello (Honduras)
Chantal Boudreau (Canada)
Fourth official:
Lucila Venegas (Mexico)
Video assistant referee:
Abdulkadir Bitigen (Turkey)
Assistant video assistant referee:
Nicolás Gallo (Colombia)

=== Netherlands vs Brazil ===
24 July 2021
20:00

Netherlands	3–3	Brazil
Miedema 3', 59'; Janssen 79'	Report (TOCOG); Report (FIFA)	Debinha 16'; Marta 65' (pen.); Ludmila 68'

Miyagi Stadium, Rifu
Attendance: 2,621
Referee: Kate Jacewicz (Australia)

Netherlands	Brazil

GK	1	Sari van Veenendaal (c)
RB	2	Lynn Wilms
CB	3	Stefanie van der Gragt	(yellow card) 64'
CB	4	Aniek Nouwen
LB	17	Dominique Janssen
CM	6	Jill Roord	(yellow card) 72'
CM	14	Jackie Groenen
CM	10	Daniëlle van de Donk
RF	7	Shanice van de Sanden		(substituted off) 67'
CF	9	Vivianne Miedema		(substituted off) 89'
LF	11	Lieke Martens
Substitutions:
FW	18	Lineth Beerensteyn		(substituted on) 67'
MF	13	Victoria Pelova		(substituted on) 89'
Manager:
Sarina Wiegman

GK	1	Bárbara
RB	13	Bruna
CB	3	Érika
CB	4	Rafaelle
LB	6	Tamires
RM	7	Duda		(substituted off) 46'
CM	8	Formiga		(substituted off) 46'
CM	17	Andressinha
LM	10	Marta (c)		(substituted off) 75'
CF	16	Beatriz		(substituted off) 46'
CF	9	Debinha
Substitutions:
FW	21	Andressa		(substituted on) 46'
FW	12	Ludmila	(yellow card) 78'	(substituted on) 46'
MF	11	Angelina		(substituted on) 46'
FW	15	Geyse		(substituted on) 75'
Manager:
(Sweden) Pia Sundhage

Assistant referees:
Kim Kyong-min (South Korea)
Lee Seul-gi (South Korea)
Fourth official:
Yoshimi Yamashita (Japan)
Video assistant referee:
Erick Miranda (Mexico)
Assistant video assistant referee:
Paweł Raczkowski (Poland)

=== Netherlands vs China PR ===
27 July 2021
20:30

Netherlands	8–2	China
Van de Sanden 12'; Beerensteyn 37', 45+2'; Martens 47', 70'; Miedema 65', 76'; Pelova 71'	Report (TOCOG); Report (FIFA)	Wang Shanshan 28'; Wang Yanwen 69'

International Stadium Yokohama, Yokohama
Attendance: 0
Referee: Salima Mukansanga (Rwanda)

Netherlands	China PR

GK	1	Sari van Veenendaal (c)
RB	2	Lynn Wilms	(substituted off) 46'
CB	17	Dominique Janssen
CB	4	Aniek Nouwen	(substituted off) 76'
LB	5	Merel van Dongen
CM	6	Jill Roord	(substituted off) 46'
CM	14	Jackie Groenen
CM	10	Daniëlle van de Donk	(substituted off) 62'
RF	7	Shanice van de Sanden	(substituted off) 46'
CF	18	Lineth Beerensteyn
LF	11	Lieke Martens
Substitutions:
DF	15	Kika van Es	(substituted on) 46'
MF	13	Victoria Pelova	(substituted on) 46'
FW	19	Renate Jansen	(substituted on) 46'
FW	9	Vivianne Miedema	(substituted on) 62'
DF	21	Anouk Dekker	(substituted on) 76'
Manager:
Sarina Wiegman

GK	12	Peng Shimeng
RB	2	Li Mengwen
CB	3	Lin Yuping	(yellow card) 30'
CB	16	Wang Xiaoxue
LB	17	Luo Guiping		(substituted off) 27'
RM	7	Wang Shuang
CM	13	Yang Lina
CM	8	Wang Yan	(yellow card) 44'	(substituted off) 59'
LM	6	Zhang Xin
CF	11	Wang Shanshan (c)
CF	20	Xiao Yuyi		(substituted off) 59'
Substitutions:
MF	19	Wang Ying	(yellow card) 82'	(substituted on) 27'
MF	14	Liu Jing		(substituted on) 59'
MF	10	Wang Yanwen		(substituted on) 59'
Manager:
Jia Xiuquan

Assistant referees:
Bernadettar Kwimbira (Malawi)
Mary Njorge (Kenya)
Fourth official:
Maria Rivet (Mauritius)
Video assistant referee:
Benoît Millot (France)
Assistant video assistant referee:
Edvin Jurisevic (United States)

=== Brazil vs Zambia ===
27 July 2021
20:30

Brazil	1–0	Zambia
Andressa 19'	Report (TOCOG); Report (FIFA)

Saitama Stadium 2002, Saitama
Attendance: 0
Referee: Yoshimi Yamashita (Japan)

Brazil	Zambia

GK	1	Bárbara
RB	19	Letícia Santos
CB	2	Poliana		(substituted off) 65' (Note: As Bruna came on as a concussion substitute for Poliana, this did not count towards the limit of five substitutions allowed for Brazil.)
CB	4	Rafaelle
LB	14	Jucinara
RM	21	Andressa		(substituted off) 81'
CM	8	Formiga		(substituted off) 46'
CM	11	Angelina	(yellow card) 78'
LM	10	Marta (c)		(substituted off) 46'
CF	16	Beatriz		(substituted off) 28'
CF	12	Ludmila		(substituted off) 65'
Substitutions:
FW	20	Giovana		(substituted on) 28'
FW	7	Duda		(substituted on) 46'
MF	5	Julia		(substituted on) 46'
FW	15	Geyse		(substituted on) 65'
DF	13	Bruna		(substituted on) 65'
FW	9	Debinha		(substituted on) 81'
Manager:
(Sweden) Pia Sundhage

GK	16	Hazel Nali		(substituted off) 18'
RB	8	Margaret Belemu
CB	15	Agness Musase
CB	3	Lushomo Mweemba	(red card) 14'
LB	13	Martha Tembo
CM	10	Grace Chanda
CM	14	Ireen Lungu
RW	12	Avell Chitundu		(substituted off) 18'
AM	11	Barbra Banda (c)
LW	17	Racheal Kundananji		(substituted off) 90+3'
CF	7	Lubandji Ochumba
Substitutions:
GK	22	Ngambo Musole		(substituted on) 18'
DF	18	Vast Phiri	(yellow card) 45+8'	(substituted on) 18'
MF	19	Evarine Katongo		(substituted on) 90+3'
Manager:
Bruce Mwape

Assistant referees:
Makoto Bozono (Japan)
Naomi Teshirogi (Japan)
Fourth official:
Stéphanie Frappart (France)
Video assistant referee:
Tiago Martins (Portugal)
Assistant video assistant referee:
Abdulkadir Bitigen (Turkey)

== Discipline ==
Fair play points would have been used as a tiebreaker if the overall and head-to-head records of teams were tied. These were calculated based on yellow and red cards received in all group matches as follows:

- first yellow card: minus 1 point;
- indirect red card (second yellow card): minus 3 points;
- direct red card: minus 4 points;
- yellow card and direct red card: minus 5 points;

Only one of the above deductions could be applied to a player in a single match.

Team	Match 1				Match 2				Match 3				Points
Team	Booked	(yellow card) (yellow-red card)	Sent off (straight red)	(yellow card) (red card)	Booked	(yellow card) (yellow-red card)	Sent off (straight red)	(yellow card) (red card)	Booked	(yellow card) (yellow-red card)	Sent off (straight red)	(yellow card) (red card)	Points
Brazil					1				1				−2
Netherlands	1				2								−3
China							1		3				−7
Zambia	1				1				1		1		−7
