= 2025 CAF Women's Champions League COSAFA Qualifiers =

Association football championship

Hollywoodbets COSAFA Women's Champions League 2025
Tournament details
- Host country: South Africa
- City: Johannesburg
- Dates: 22 – 31 August 2025
- Teams: 10 (from 1 sub-confederation)
- Venue: 1 (in 1 host city)

Final positions
- Champions: (Botswana) Gaborone United (1st title)
- Runners-up: (Zambia) ZESCO Ndola Girls

Tournament statistics
- Matches played: 15
- Goals scored: 63 (4.2 per match)
- Top scorer(s): (Botswana) Gaonyadiwe Ontlametse (7 goals)
- Best player: (Zambia) Eneless Phiri
- Best goalkeeper: (Botswana) Tlamelo Pheresi
- Fair play award: (Zambia) ZESCO Ndola Girls

The 2025 COSAFA Women's Champions League, officially known as the 2025 Hollywoodbets COSAFA Women's Champions League for sponsorship reasons, was the fifth edition of the annual international women's club football competition organized by COSAFA to decide the region's qualifier for the 2025 CAF Women's Champions League. The tournament was held in Johannesburg, South Africa, from 22 to 31 August 2025.

The University of the Western Cape were defending champions, having won last year's final 9–8 on penalties. They did not qualify for the 2025 edition. Gaborone United Ladies defeated ZESCO Ndola 4–3 on penalties to qualify for the 2025 CAF Women's Champions League.

== Entrants ==
10 of the fourteen COSAFA member associations entered teams for the competition, with Comoros and Lesotho returning after not participating in the previous edition.

Team	App.	Last	Previous best performance
(Botswana) Gaborone United Ladies	2nd	2024	Runners-up (2024)
(Comoros) Olympic de Moroni	3rd	2023	Fourth place (2022
(Eswatini) Young Buffaloes	4th	2024	Semi-finals (2024)
(Lesotho) Kick4Life	1st	Debut	
(Malawi) Ntopwa FC	2nd	2023	Group stage (2023)
(Mozambique) CD Costa do Sol	3rd	2023	Third place (2023)
(Namibia) Beauties FC	1st	Debut	
(South Africa) Mamelodi Sundowns	4th	2023	Champions (2021, 2023)
(Zambia) ZESCO Ndola Girls	1st	Debut	
(Zimbabwe) Herentals Queens	2nd	2024	Semi-finals (2024)

Associations that did not enter a team:

- Angola
- Madagascar
- Mauritius
- Seychelles

== Venue ==
City	Stadium	Capacity
Johannesburg	AW Muller Stadium	~5,000

== Match officials ==
=== Referees ===
- (South Africa) Nonjabulo Nonhle Ndlela
- (Zimbabwe) Chipo MAYIMBO Mercy
- (Lesotho) Nteboheleng Theresia SETOKO
- (Zambia) Gloria keke SAMBUMBA
- (Namibia) Nuusiku Vistoria SHANGULA
- (Botswana) Seonyatseng Joyce Tshephe
- (Malawi) Eness M. GUMBO

=== Assistant Referees ===
- (Namibia) Eveline Lungameni AUGUSTINUS
- (Madagascar) Tahinjanahary Martine Hasiniaina
- (Mozambique) Roda Artimisa MONDLANE
- (Botswana) Leungo Tsogang
- (South Africa) Maneo Evodia TAU
- (Zambia) Lumbizai Musawa
- (South Africa) Nandipha MENZE
- (Madagascar) Hasimbola Rasoloniaina

Video assistant referees

- (Zimbabwe) GIMO Grace
- (Zimbabwe) Claris Sekai SIMANGO
- (Namibia) Nuusiku Vistoria SHANGULA
- (Malawi) Eness M. GUMBO
- (Zambia) Lumbizai Musawa
- (South Africa) Nonjabulo Nonhle Ndlela
- (South Africa) Nandipha MENZE

== Draw ==
The official draw was held on 5 August 2025 in Johannesburg. The seeded teams were:

Seeded	Unseeded
(South Africa) Mamelodi Sundowns Ladies (hosts); (Botswana) Gaborone United Ladies; (Zimbabwe) Herentals Queens	(Malawi) Ntopwa FC; (Namibia) Beauties FC; (Zambia) ZESCO Ndola Girls; (Eswatini) Young Buffaloes; (Lesotho) Kick4Life WFC; (Mozambique) CD Costa do Sol; (Comoros) Olympic de Moroni

== Group stage ==
Tiebreakers

Teams are ranked according to points (3 points for a win, 1 point for a draw, 0 points for a loss), and if tied on points, the following tiebreaking criteria are applied, in the order given, to determine the rankings.

1. Points in head-to-head matches among tied teams;
2. Goal difference in head-to-head matches among tied teams;
3. Goals scored in head-to-head matches among tied teams;
4. If more than two teams are tied, and after applying all head-to-head criteria above, a subset of teams are still tied, all head-to-head criteria above are reapplied exclusively to this subset of teams;
5. Goal difference in all group matches;
6. Goals scored in all group matches;
7. Penalty shoot-out if only two teams are tied and they met in the last round of the group;
8. Disciplinary points (yellow card = 1 point, red card as a result of two yellow cards = 3 points, direct red card = 3 points, yellow card followed by direct red card = 4 points);
9. Drawing of lots.

=== Group A ===
Pos	Team	Pld	W	D	L	GF	GA	GD	Pts	Qualification
1	(South Africa) Mamelodi Sundowns (H)	3	3	0	0	11	0	+11	9	Semi-finals
2	(Zambia) ZESCO Ndola Girls	3	2	0	1	8	4	+4	6	Semi-finals
3	(Namibia) Beauties FC	3	1	0	2	3	10	−7	3	
4	(Malawi) Ntopwa FC	3	0	0	3	3	11	−8	0	

Source: COSAFA
Rules for classification: Tiebreakers
(H) Hosts
22 August 2025
12:00

Beauties FC (Namibia)	0–3	(Zambia) ZESCO Ndola Girls
	Report	Chitundu 21'; Mulubwa 41' (pen.); E. Phiri 45+3' (pen.)

AW Muller Stadium, Johannesburg
Referee: Seonyatseng Tshephe (Botswana)
22 August 2025
15:00

Mamelodi Sundowns (South Africa)	3–0	(Malawi) Ntopwa FC
Tholakele 15', 44'; Majiya 54'	Report

AW Muller Stadium, Johannesburg
Referee: Nteboheleng Setoko (Lesotho)

24 August 2025
12:00

Ntopwa FC (Malawi)	0–3	(Namibia) Beauties FC
	Report	Hikuam 47', 58'; Amukoto 87'

AW Muller Stadium, Johannesburg
Referee: Mercy Mayimbo (Zimbabwe)
24 August 2025
15:00

Mamelodi Sundowns (South Africa)	1–0	(Zambia) ZESCO Ndola Girls
Rabale 18'	Report

AW Muller Stadium, Johannesburg
Referee: Grace Gimo (Zimbabwe)

26 August 2025
12:00

ZESCO Ndola Girls (Zambia)	5–3	(Malawi) Ntopwa FC
Chitundu 6'; E. Phiri 42', 77'; Mubanga 47'; Milambo 65'	Report	Alufandika 80'; Banda 90'; Yosefe 90+6'

AW Muller Stadium, Johannesburg
Referee: Seonyatseng Tshephe (Botswana)
26 August 2025
15:00

Mamelodi Sundowns (South Africa)	7–0	(Namibia) Beauties FC
Mbane 15', 38', 53'; Ramalepe 23'; Makhurubetshi 75'; Tholakele 78'; Mugwara 82'	Report

AW Muller Stadium, Johannesburg
Referee: Mercy Mayimbo (Zimbabwe)

=== Group B ===
Pos	Team	Pld	W	D	L	GF	GA	GD	Pts	Qualification
1	(Botswana) Gaborone United Ladies	2	2	0	0	11	1	+10	6	Semi-finals
2	(Eswatini) Young Buffaloes	2	1	0	1	3	2	+1	3	
3	(Lesotho) Kick4Life	2	0	0	2	2	13	−11	0	

Source: COSAFA
Rules for classification: Tiebreakers
23 August 2025
12:00

Gaborone United Ladies (Botswana)	1–0	(Eswatini) Young Buffaloes
Dithebe 49' (pen.)	Report

AW Muller Stadium, Johannesburg
Referee: Gloria Sambumba (Zambia)

25 August 2025
12:00

Young Buffaloes (Eswatini)	3–1	(Lesotho) Kick4Life
Mokgale 38'; Mosala 66' (o.g.); Dvuba 75'	Report	Mohoshela 10'

AW Muller Stadium, Johannesburg
Referee: Eness Gumbo (Malawi)

27 August 2025
12:00

Gaborone United Ladies (Botswana)	10–1	(Lesotho) Kick4Life
Maponga 1', 6', 29', 56'; Ontlametse 14', 17', 35', 45+', 69'; Kenyaditswe 73'	Report	Tsoinyane 88'

AW Muller Stadium, Johannesburg
Referee: Vistoria Shangula (Namibia)

=== Group C ===
Pos	Team	Pld	W	D	L	GF	GA	GD	Pts	Qualification
1	(Mozambique) CD Costa do Sol	2	1	1	0	4	2	+2	4	Semi-finals
2	(Zimbabwe) Herentals Queens	2	1	0	1	4	4	0	3	
3	(Comoros) Olympic de Moroni	2	0	1	1	4	6	−2	1	

Source: COSAFA
Rules for classification: Tiebreakers
23 August 2025
15:00

Herentals Queens (Zimbabwe)	0–2	(Mozambique) CD Costa do Sol
	Report	Lúcia Leila 29'; Eunência 50'

AW Muller Stadium, Johannesburg
Referee: Vistoria Shangula (Namibia)

25 August 2025
15:00

CD Costa do Sol (Mozambique)	2–2	(Comoros) Olympic de Moroni
Joana 31'; Lúcia Leila 83'	Report	Marlene 11' (o.g.); A. Ali 17'

AW Muller Stadium, Johannesburg
Referee: Vistoria Shangula (Namibia)

27 August 2025
15:00

Herentals Queens (Zimbabwe)	4–2	(Comoros) Olympic de Moroni
Nyagumbo 43', 69', 90+5'; Mabika 90'	Report	S. Ali 45'; Mamonjy 47'

AW Muller Stadium, Johannesburg
Referee: Nteboheleng Setoko (Lesotho)

=== Best runners-up ranking ===
Since Group A only had four teams, the results against fourth-placed teams were omitted for this ranking.

Pos	Grp	Team	Pld	W	D	L	GF	GA	GD	Pts	Qualification
1	A	(Zambia) ZESCO Ndola Girls	2	1	0	1	3	1	+2	3	Semi-finals
2	B	(Eswatini) Young Buffaloes	2	1	0	1	3	2	+1	3	
3	C	(Zimbabwe) Herentals Queens	2	1	0	1	4	4	0	3	

Source: COSAFA
Rules for classification: Tiebreakers

== Knockout stage ==
=== Bracket ===
Semi-finals
29 August – Johannesburg
(Botswana) Gaborone United	3
(Mozambique) CD Costa do Sol	1
29 August – Johannesburg
(South Africa) Mamelodi Sundowns	1
(Zambia) ZESCO Ndola Girls	2

Final
31 August – Johannesburg
(Botswana) Gaborone United (p)	1 (4)
(Zambia) ZESCO Ndola Girls	1 (3)

=== Semi-finals ===
29 August 2025
12:00

Gaborone United (Botswana)	3–1	(Mozambique) CD Costa do Sol
Ontlametse 16', 89'; Maponga 44'	Report	Latifo 45+1'

AW Muller Stadium, Johannesburg
Referee: Vistoria Shangula (Namibia)

29 August 2025
15:00

Mamelodi Sundowns (South Africa)	1–2	(Zambia) ZESCO Ndola Girls
Rabale 45+5'	Report	E. Phiri 53'; Kabwe 89'

AW Muller Stadium, Johannesburg
Referee: Nteboheleng Setoko (Lesotho)

=== Final ===
31 August 2025
15:00

Gaborone United (Botswana)	1–1 (a.e.t.)	(Zambia) ZESCO Ndola Girls
Chomba 45' (o.g.)	Report	Kabwe 90'
Penalties
Mochawe (penalty scored); Modise (penalty missed); Gaofetoge (penalty missed); Baeletsi (penalty scored); Modisenyane (penalty scored); Radiakanyo (penalty scored)	4–3	(penalty scored) Mupeso; (penalty scored) Mulubwa; (penalty scored) E. Phiri; (penalty missed) Nali; (penalty missed) Chomba; (penalty missed) V. Phiri

AW Muller Stadium, Johannesburg
Referee: Nonjabulo Nonhle Ndlela (South Africa)

== Awards and statistics ==
=== Goalscorers ===
There have been 63 goals scored in 15 matches, for an average of 4.2 goals per match (as of 31 August 2025).

Rank	Player	Team	Goals
1	(Botswana) Gaonyadiwe Ontlametse	(Botswana) Gaborone United Ladies	7
2	(Botswana) Maungo Maponga	(Botswana) Gaborone United Ladies	5
3	(South Africa) Bambanani Mbane	(South Africa) Mamelodi Sundowns	3
3	(Zimbabwe) Morelife Nyagumbo	(Zimbabwe) Herentals Queens	3
3	(Zambia) Eneless Phiri	(Zambia) ZESCO Ndola Girls	3
3	(Botswana) Refilwe Tholakele	(South Africa) Mamelodi Sundowns	3
7	(Zambia) Avell Chitundu	(Zambia) ZESCO Ndola Girls	2
7	(Namibia) Millicent Hikuam	(Namibia) Beauties FC	2
7	(Zambia) Fridah Kabwe	(Zambia) ZESCO Ndola Girls	2
7	(Mozambique) Lúcia Moçambique	(Mozambique) CD Costa do Sol	2
7	(Lesotho) Boitumelo Rabale	(South Africa) Mamelodi Sundowns	2
12	(Comoros) Anllaouia Hadhirami Ali	(Comoros) Olympic de Moroni	1
12	(Madagascar) Suraya Ali	(Comoros) Olympic de Moroni	1
12	(Malawi) Rose Alufandika	(Malawi) Ntopwa FC	1
12	(Namibia) Twelikondjele Amukoto	(Namibia) Beauties FC	1
12	(Malawi) Kondawo Banda	(Malawi) Ntopwa FC	1
12	(Botswana) Keitumetse Dithebe	(Botswana) Gaborone United Ladies	1
12	(Eswatini) Nomvuyo Dvuba	(Eswatini) Young Buffaloes	1
12	(Botswana) Desiree Kenyaditswe	(Botswana) Gaborone United Ladies	1
12	(Mozambique) Samira Latifo	(Mozambique) CD Costa do Sol	1
12	(Zimbabwe) Polite Mabika	(Zimbabwe) Herentals Queens	1
12	(Mozambique) Eunência Machava	(Mozambique) CD Costa do Sol	1
12	(South Africa) Karabo Makhurubetshi	(South Africa) Mamelodi Sundowns	1
12	(Madagascar) Solomampionona Mamonjy	(Comoros) Olympic de Moroni	1
12	(Lesotho) Nteboheleng Mohoshela	(Lesotho) Kick4Life	1
12	(South Africa) Nthabiseng Majiya	(South Africa) Mamelodi Sundowns	1
12	(Zambia) Milla Milambo	(Zambia) ZESCO Ndola Girls	1
12	(Zambia) Charity Mubanga	(Zambia) ZESCO Ndola Girls	1
12	(South Africa) Sandra Mugwara	(South Africa) Mamelodi Sundowns	1
12	(Mozambique) Joana Mussuie	(Mozambique) CD Costa do Sol	1
12	(Eswatini) Nonjabuliso Mokgale	(Eswatini) Young Buffaloes	1
12	(Zambia) Penelope Mulubwa	(Zambia) ZESCO Ndola Girls	1
12	(South Africa) Lebohang Ramalepe	(South Africa) Mamelodi Sundowns	1
12	(Lesotho) Lerato Tsoinyane	(Lesotho) Kick4Life	1
12	(Malawi) Jessie Yosefe	(Malawi) Ntopwa FC	1

=== Own goals ===
Rank	Player	Team	Goals
1	(Lesotho) Matšeliso Mosala	(Lesotho) Kick4Life	1
1	(Mozambique) Marlene Janeiro	(Mozambique) CD Costa do Sol	1
1	(Zambia) Jackline Chomba	(Zambia) ZESCO Ndola Girls	1
1	(Malawi) Ruth Nyirongo	(Malawi) Ntopwa FC	1

=== Group Stage Best XI ===
The COSAFA Technical Study Group has announced the group stage Best XI as follows:

Goalkeepers	Defenders	Midfielders	Forwards
Group Stage Best XI
(South Africa) Dlamini	(Zimbabwe) Moyo (South Africa) Mbane (Botswana) Gaofetoge (South Africa) Ramalepe	(Mozambique) Machava (Lesotho) Rabale (Botswana) Radiakanyo	(Botswana) Ontlametse (Botswana) Tholakele (Botswana) Maponga

Coach: (South Africa) Godfrey Sapula

=== Overall Best XI ===
The COSAFA Technical Study Group has announced the tournament's Best XI as follows:

Goalkeepers	Defenders	Midfielders	Forwards
Best XI
(Botswana) Pheresi	(Zambia) Soko (Botswana) Mochawe (Botswana) Gaofetoge (Zambia) Bwalya	(Zambia) Muchinga (Lesotho) Rabale (Botswana) Radiakanyo	(Botswana) Ontlametse (Botswana) Tholakele (Botswana) Maponga

Coach: (Burundi) Khalid Niyonzima

=== Awards ===
The COSAFA Women's Champions League technical study group selected the following as the best of the tournament.

Award	Player	Team
Best Player	(Zambia) Eneless Phiri	(Zambia) ZESCO Ndola Girls
Top Goal scorer	(Botswana) Gaonyadiwe Ontlametse	(Botswana) Gaborone United Ladies
Best Goalkeeper	(Botswana) Tlamelo Pheresi	(Botswana) Gaborone United Ladies
Fairplay team	(Zambia) ZESCO Ndola Girls	
