= ZESCO Ndola Girls F.C. =

ZESCO Ndola Girls
- Nicknames: Zega Mambo; Team Ya Ziko
- Ground: Levy Mwanawasa Stadium
- Capacity: 49800
- Coordinates: 12.5830°S 28.3641°E
- Owner: ZESCO
- Head Coach: (Zambia) William Zulu
- League: FAZ Women's Super Division
- 1st
- Website: http://www.zescounitedfc.co.zm/
| Home colours | Away colours |

ZESCO Ndola Girls is a Zambian women's professional football club affiliated to ZESCO and based in Ndola that competes in the FAZ Women's Super Division, the top tier of Zambian women's football.

== History ==
The club first gained prominence in the Copperbelt Women’s League, finishing second in 2014 behind Moba Queens. They claimed their first regional title the following season, marking their rise as a competitive force in Copperbelt women’s football. In 2016, ZESCO Ndola Girls were runners‑up to Indeni Roses, but reclaimed the regional crown in 2017, continuing a period of strong performances.

=== Transition to National Competition (2020–2024) ===
With the establishment of the FAZ Women’s Super League, ZESCO Ndola Girls became consistent contenders at national level. They finished third in the 2020–21 season, behind Green Buffaloes and Red Arrows. The club improved to second place in 2023–24, again trailing Green Buffaloes, who dominated the league during this period.

=== Breakthrough and First National Title (2024–25) ===
The 2024–25 season marked a historic turning point. The club ended Green Buffaloes’ 36‑match unbeaten run with a 1–0 victory early in the campaign and completed the first round of fixtures unbeaten. They went on to win the FAZ Women’s Super Division for the first time, securing qualification for the CAF Women’s Champions League COSAFA qualifiers.

=== Continental Debut and COSAFA Success (2025) ===
ZESCO Ndola Girls made their continental debut at the 2025 COSAFA Women’s Champions League qualifiers. They opened their campaign with a 3–0 win over Beauties F.C. of Namibia, followed by a narrow 1–0 loss to Mamelodi Sundowns Ladies. A high‑scoring 5–3 victory over Ntopwa F.C. of Malawi secured their place in the semifinals as the best runners‑up. In the semifinal, they achieved a landmark 2–1 win over Mamelodi Sundowns Ladies, then two-time African champions. They reached the final, where they drew 1–1 with Gaborone United of Botswana before losing 4–3 on penalties. Despite the defeat, the team earned the tournament’s Fair Play Award, underscoring their disciplined and competitive performance on debut.

=== COSAFA Finalist (2026) ===
They were defeated 5–0 in the semifinals by Mamelodi Sundowns who went on to win their third title after defeating ZESCO Ndola 2–1 in the final.

=== Rivalries ===
ZESCO Ndola Girls contest the Ndola Derby against Indeni Roses, a long‑standing regional rivalry dating back to their Copperbelt League era.

== Players ==
As of August 2025

ZESCO Ndola Girls F.C. squad for 2025 season.

Note: Flags indicate national team as defined under FIFA eligibility rules; some limited exceptions apply. Players may hold more than one non-FIFA nationality.

| No. | Pos. | Nation | Player |
|---|---|---|---|
| 1 | GK | ZAM | Melody Kipimpi |
| 3 | DF | ZAM | Vast Phiri |
| 4 | DF | ZAM | Abigail Munkombwe |
| 5 | MF | ZAM | Esther Muchinga |
| 6 | MF | ZAM | Dorothy Yamba Yamba |
| 7 | MF | ZAM | Eneless Phiri |
| 8 | FW | ZAM | Charity Mubanga |
| 9 | FW | ZAM | Dorothy Daka |
| 10 | FW | ZAM | Thandiwe Ndhlovu |
| 11 | FW | ZAM | Iless Phiri |
| 12 | DF | ZAM | Theresa Musatila |
| 13 | DF | ZAM | Avell Chitundu |
| 15 | MF | ZAM | Mary Mbewe |

| No. | Pos. | Nation | Player |
|---|---|---|---|
| 16 | FW | ZAM | Leticia Lungu |
| 17 | MF | ZAM | Penelope Mulubwa |
| 18 | DF | ZAM | Annie Namonje |
| 19 | FW | ZAM | Majory Mwila Mulenga |
| 20 | DF | ZAM | Elizabeth Mupeso |
| 20 | DF | ZAM | Mable Bwalya |
| 20 | DF | ZAM | Jackline Chomba |
| 20 | DF | ZAM | Grace Kapansa |
| 20 | DF | ZAM | Fridah Kabwe |
| 20 | DF | ZAM | Roydah Ngandu |
| 20 | DF | ZAM | Hazel Natasha Nali |
| 20 | DF | ZAM | Judith Soko |
| 20 | DF | ZAM | Milla Tyreen Milamba |

== Honours ==
- COSAFA Women's Champions League runners-up: 2025
- FAZ Women's Super Division: 2024/25, 2025/26

Awards

- 2025 COSAFA Women's Champions League: Fair Play
