= Zambia women's national football team =

Association football team

Zambia
- Nickname: Copper Queens
- Association: FAZ
- Confederation: CAF (Africa)
- Sub-confederation: COSAFA (Southern Africa)
- Head coach: Nora Häuptle
- Captain: Barbra Banda
- FIFA code: ZAM
First colours	Second colours	Third colours

FIFA ranking
- Current: 65 ▼1 (16 June 2026)
- Highest: 62 (August – December 2024)
- Lowest: 131 (October – December 2007)

First international
- South Africa 5–3 Zambia (South Africa; 5 November 1994)

Biggest win
- Zambia 15–0 Mauritius (Ibhayi, South Africa; 1 August 2019)

Biggest defeat
- Zambia 3–10 Netherlands (Rifu, Japan; 21 July 2021)

World Cup
- Appearances: 1 (first in 2023)
- Best result: Group stage (2023)

Africa Cup of Nations
- Appearances: 6 (first in 1995)
- Best result: Third place (2022)

Summer Olympics
- Appearances: 2 (first in 2020)
- Best result: Group stage (2020, 2024)

The Zambia women's national association football team represents Zambia in women's association football. Nicknamed the Copper Queens, they debuted in the 2023 FIFA Women's World Cup.

== History ==
Zambia became an official women's national team in 1983, and was one of the first African women's national football teams to exist on the continent.

In 2003, the kit for the team was provided as a result of a sponsorship deal with Umbro who first agreed to sponsor the Zambia national football team. The team's official kit colours include green shorts, a green jersey and green socks.

Some matches were played in 1994, for qualification for 1995 FIFA Women's World Cup. Zambia played in a 5 November 1994 World Cup qualifier against South Africa in South Africa, where Zambia lost 3–5. In the return match in Lusaka, Zambia on 17 November 1994, Zambia lost with a score of 2–6.

Between these games and 2001, it did not play in any FIFA sanctioned matches. It participated in the 2002 COSAFA Cup women's tournament in Harare, Zimbabwe. It was in Group A. It beat the Malawi women's national football team 8–0 on 20 April. It played against Zimbabwe women's national football team on 22 April where Zambia lost 0–4. On 23 April, it beat Lesotho women's national football team 3–1. It finished second in its group. On 26 April, it lost to South Africa women's national football team 1–3 in the semifinals. It went on to beat Mozambique women's national football team 1–0 in the third place game, with Julia Siame scoring the only goal in the 60th minute. Later that year, in a regional qualifying match for a different tournament, on 21 September in Lusaka, Zambia against South Africa, the team lost 1–4 after being down 0–2 at the half. In the return match in South Africa on 12 October 2002, it lost 0–4. By 2003, it was ranked the 106th best women's national team by FIFA.

In 2004, its rank dropped to 113. That year, the team was coached by Cephias Katongo, who was coaching the Zambia national under-17 football team and a top-level club team at the same time. In 2004, Zimbabwe women's national football team had committed to play a match against Zambia before Zimbabwe took on Tanzania in Dar e Salaam and this did not happen because of organizational problems by Zimbabwe Football Association.

In 2005, the team's FIFA ranking was unchanged and remained at 113, with it playing in no FIFA recognised matches. The following year, in 2006, Zambia world ranking dropped down to 126. That year, the head coach was George Chikokola. In March 2006, the team played a home and away set of against Congo DR. On Saturday, 11 March 2006 in a game played in Lubumbashi, Congo DR won 3–0 against Zambia. Congo DR led 1–0 at the half. On Saturday, 25 March 2006 in a game played in Chingola, Zambia lost 2–3, a score that remained the same from half time, against Congo DR.

In 2006, Zambia hosted a regional COSAFA women's football tournament. Originally nine countries were scheduled to participate but Mozambique withdrew and the number was cut to eight. South Africa won the tournament and Zambia came out as third-place winner.

The 2006 team had 20 players. The regional COSAFA championship team was announced on 18 August 2006. The 2006 Confederation of Southern African Football Associations women's tournament was held in Lusaka. It was in Group A. On 22 August, it tied Namibia 2–2 with Noria Sosala scoring in the 15th minute and Charity Mpongo scoring in the 30th minute for Zambia. It beat Swaziland 7–0 on 24 August, with Charity Mpongo scoring in the 23rd, 43rd, 64th and 67th minutes, Susan Banda scoring in the 37th minute, Gift Lishika scoring in the 41st minute, and Martha Kapombo scoring in the 56th minute for Zambia. It finished in the top of its group. On 25 August in a semifinal against Namibia, it tied 1–1 with Martha Kapombo scoring its only goal in the 90th minute. It lost the game in an overtime shoot out by 4–5. On 26 August, it beat Zimbabwe 2–1 to finish third with Noria Sosala scoring both goals in the 67th and 75th minutes.

2007 saw an improvement in rank for Zambia, moving up 9 sports to 117 best team in the world. That year, the team was supported to participate in the 2007 African Games qualifying tournament, opening against the Mozambique women's national football team and Zambia withdrew from the tournament before it played a single game. Later that year, on Sunday, 2 December 2007 in a game played in Harare, Zimbabwe won 3–1 against Zambia. The game was part of the 2008 African Women Championship. In the return match on Sunday, 16 December 2007 in a game played in Lusaka, Zambia won 2–1 against Zimbabwe.

In 2008, the team's ranking again went up, this time to 110. The played 1 FIFA recognised match on Sunday, 4 May 2008 in a game played in Benguela against Botswana. Zambia won 4–2, holding on from a 3–1 score at the half. In 2009, FIFA ranked the country as the 92 in the world. That year, it did not play any FIFA recognised matches. The team's world ranking fell in 2010 to 122. That year, it played in 2 FIFA recognised matches. The first was on Saturday, 2 October 2010 in a game played in Lobatse against Botswana, which Zambia won 4–1, holding on to a 3–0 half time lead. The second game was on Saturday, 23 October 2010 in a game played in Lusaka. Zambia won 2–1 against Botswana holding on to a 1–0 half time lead.

Zambia team's rank fell in 2011, this time to 125th best in the world. It did not make it into the final group qualification round for the CAF region that fought it out to represent Africa in the World Cup. In January, the team played a pair of games against South Africa. It lost 15 January game in Lusaka 1–2, going down with a score of 0–0 at the half. It lost 29 January game in Umlazi 0–3 after being down 0–1 at the half. Later that year, it played 3 games in Harare against South Africa, Tanzania and Botswana. On Saturday, 2 July, South Africa won 4–1 against Zambia. On Sunday, 3 July, Zambia won 4–1 against Tanzania. On Tuesday, 5 July, Botswana lost 1–4 against Zambia. The country did not have a team competing at the 2011 All Africa Games. Going into the 2012 season, the team coach is Enala Phiri-Simbeye, a woman with Deborah Chisanga serving as the team's skipper. On 14 January 2012, it played a game against Malawi that it won 7–0 after being ahead 4–0 at the half. The game was part of the CAF African Women's Championship and was played in the first round and played in Lusaka. Prior to the start of the game, the team danced on the field and sang Chikokishi music. Malawi beat Zambia 4–2 following a 1–0 lead at halftime in the return leg played in Blantyre, Malawi on 29 January 2012. Suzan Banda scored the second goal of the game, and the first for Zambia in the match. Mupopa Kawange scored Zambia's second goal. Zambia had a number of fans, most women, who attended the game in Malawi. In March 2012, the team was ranked the 126th best in the world and the 19th best in CAF.

In the African qualifiers for the 2020 Olympics, it defeated Cameroon in the final round and qualified for the Olympics for the first time. In its Olympics debut, it experienced a 3–10 loss to the Netherlands, the highest-scoring women's soccer match in Olympics history.

=== Olympic team ===
For the 2012 Summer Olympics, there were no age restrictions for players, and Zambia opted to qualify with a U20/U23 side. Zambia competed in the qualifying tournament in an effort to represent the country at the 2012 Summer Olympics. The qualification tournament started in 2010. The team was coached by Enala Phiri-Simbeye. During its campaign, it beat the Botswana women's national football team 4–1 in Gaborone and 2–1 in Lusaka. The performance of the team earned praise from women's groups inside the country. In January 2011, Zambia had to face South Africa in the qualifying tournament for the Olympics. The squad named to play against South Africa included goalkeepers Mirriam Katamanda, Ennie Matukuta, Defenders Meya Banda, Verocia Chiluba, Jessica Chabota, Mulai Wilombe, Deborah Chisenga, Veronica Chisala, Midfielders Misozi Zulu, Susan Banda, Etas Banda, Fostina Sakala, Kabange Mupopo, Rachel Chisha, Chisala Musonda, and Strikers Mwila Bowa, Noria Sosala, Gift Lisaka and Ednasha Mambwe. Chiluba is the second daughter of Zambia's president.

Coached by Enala Simbeya, Zambia's U23 team participated in the 2011 All-Africa Games qualifiers. They played a pair of games against Zimbabwe. On Sunday, 13 February 2011 in a game played at the Rufaro Stadium in Harare, Zimbabwe won 1–0 against Zambia, overcoming a half time score of 0–0. On the return leg played on Sunday, 27 February 2011 in a game played at Nkoloma Stadium in Lusaka, Zambia lost 1–3 to Zimbabwe, scoring a goal in the second half with the first half ending with Zambia down 0–3. Simbeya did not name their 18-woman team until a day before the game. The loss eliminated them, with Zimbabwe going on to play Angola.

=== Homeless World Cup team ===
In 2008, a team represented the country at the Homeless World Cup. In round robin play, it won every game and were Crowned Champions. The tournament was held in Australia Melbourne. It beat Paraguay 6–1, Uganda 6–1, Kyrgyzstan 5–4, Liberia 4–1, Cameroon 17–0, Australia 18–1 and Colombia 10–1. In the half finals, it beat Kyrgyzstan 10–0. In the final, it beat Liberia 7–1.

=== 2023 World Cup ===
Zambia qualified for the 2023 FIFA Women's World Cup, making the country the first landlocked nation in Africa to qualify for a senior World Cup in either gender. By reaching the semi-finals of the 2022 Women's Africa Cup of Nations it secured qualification. It was in Group C along with Spain, Japan and Costa Rica. Its opening match against Japan ended in a 5–0 defeat. Its second match was a loss to Spain by the same 5–0 score, leading to their elimination from the Group Stage alongside Costa Rica. Their final game, which was played against Costa Rica, ended with a 3–1 win to Zambia as they placed third within Group C on three points. In this game Barbra Banda scored Zambia's first World Cup goal, which was also the 1,000th goal in Women's World Cup history.

== Results and fixtures ==
Legend

Win Draw Loss Void and postponed Fixture

=== 2025 ===
22 October 2026 WAFCON qualifying	Namibia	2–4	Zambia	Johannesburg (South Africa)
15:00 UTC+2	Kooper 52'; Coleman 59' (pen.)	Report (FIFA)	Kundananji 13', 71', 90+4'; Nachula 17'	Stadium: Dobsonville Stadium; Referee: Tatu Malogo (Tanzania)

26 October 2026 WAFCON qualifying	Zambia	3–0	Namibia	Ndola, Zambia
15:00 UTC+2	Kundananji 21'; E. Phiri 33'; Chuilufya 47'	Report (FIFA)		Stadium: Levy Mwanawasa Stadium; Referee: Dorsaf Ganouati (Tunisia)
Note: Zambia won 7–2 on aggregate.

30 November 3 Nations Tournament	Malawi	1–1	Zambia	Lilongwe, Malawi
15:00	Kabzere 56'		Nanyangwe 65'	Stadium: Bingu National Stadium

2 December 3 Nations Tournament	Zambia	3–1	Zimbabwe	Lilongwe, Malawi
15:00	Phiri 11', 12'; Nanyangwe 43'		Ncube 31'	Stadium: Bingu National Stadium

=== 2026 ===
19 February 2025 COSAFA Women's Championship	Zambia	3–0	Botswana	Polokwane, South Africa
15:00	Chanda 16'; Banda 45+1'; Mupopo 72'	Report		Stadium: Old Peter Mokaba Stadium; Referee: Nonjabulo Ndlela (South Africa)

22 February 2025 COSAFA Women's Championship	Zambia	0–0	Zimbabwe	Seshego, South Africa
15:00		Report		Stadium: Seshego Stadium; Referee: Rose Zimba (Malawi)

24 February 2025 COSAFA Women's Championship	Zambia	2–1	Eswatini	Polokwane, South Africa
12:00	Musesa 23'; Chitundu 51'	Report	Mokgale 15'	Stadium: Old Peter Mokaba Stadium; Referee: Cacilda Fernando (Mozambique)

27 February 2025 COSAFA SF	Zambia	0–1	Namibia	Polokwane, South Africa
12:00		Report	Blou 90'	Stadium: New Peter Mokaba Stadium; Referee: Nonjabulo Ndlela (South Africa)

1 March 2025 COSAFA 3rd	Zambia	3–1	Zimbabwe	Polokwane, South Africa
12:00	A. Phiri 4', 28'; Chipasula 45'	Report	Makore 45+2'	Stadium: New Peter Mokaba Stadium; Referee: Élodie Livaharivony (Madagascar)

11 April 2026 FIFA Series	Canada	4–0	Zambia	Cuiabá, Brazil
15:30 UTC−4	Prince 41', 45+2'; Chukwu 80', 88'	Report (FIFA)		Stadium: Arena Pantanal; Referee: Emikar Calderas (Venezuela)

14 April 2026 FIFA Series	Brazil	6–1	Zambia	Cuiabá, Brazil
21:30 UTC−4	Yasmim 30'; Taina Maranhão 47'; Angelina 60' (pen.); Raíssa Bahia 77'; Kerolin 90+1'; Vitória Calhau 90+6'	Report	Banda 51'	Stadium: Arena Pantanal; Referee: Emikar Calderas (Venezuela)

18 April 2026 FIFA Series	South Korea	1–1	Zambia	Cuiabá, Brazil
15:30 UTC−4	C. Phair 45+3'	Report	B. Banda 26' (pen.)	Stadium: Arena Pantanal; Referee: Edina Batista (Brazil)

19 July Friendly	Algeria	1–1	Zambia	Blida, Algeria
18:00 UTC+1	Guellati 87' (pen.)		Chipasula 47'; Chanda (yellow card) 59'; Mufunte (yellow card) 86' (yellow-red card) 90+5'	Stadium: Mustapha Tchaker Stadium; Referee: Noura Samir (Egypt)

22 July Friendly	Algeria	1–0	Zambia	Blida, Algeria
18:00 UTC+1	D'Oria (yellow card) 68'; Naïli 83'		Nachula (yellow card) 38'; Lubandji (penalty missed) 88'	Stadium: Mustapha Tchaker Stadium; Referee: Noura Samir (Egypt)

28 July 2026 WAFCON GS	Zambia	6–0	Egypt	Casablanca, Morocco
18:00 UTC+0	Nachula 26' (pen.); Banda (pen.), 32', 47', 87', 90+6'; Phiri 90+2'			Stadium: Larbi Zaouli Stadium

1 August 2026 WAFCON GS	Nigeria	1–0	Zambia	Casablanca, Morocco
21;00 UTC+0	Oshoala 8'	Report (FIFA)		Stadium: Larbi Zaouli Stadium; Referee: Josephine Wanjiku (Kenya)

5 August 2026 WAFCON GS	Malawi	1–2	Zambia	Rabat, Morocco
22:00 CAT	Ta. Chawinga 72'	Report (FIFA)	B. Banda 2'; Chilufya 37'	Stadium: Al Medina Stadium; Referee: Vincentia Amedome (Togo)

8 October 2028 CAF Women's Olympic qualifying tournament	Uganda	2–1	Zambia	Kampala, Uganda
16:00 UTC+3	Nabukenya 34'; Kabene 58'	Report	Chilufya 6'	Stadium: Hamz Stadium; Referee: Zakia El Grini (Morocco)

13 October 2028 CAF Women's Olympic qualifying tournament	Zambia	4–1 (5–3 agg.)	Uganda	Ndola, Zambia
18:00 UTC+2	Nanyangwe 8'; Phiri 21'; B. Banda 51', 85'	Report	Kabene 15'	Stadium: Levy Mwanawasa Stadium; Referee: Zakia El Grini (Morocco)

5 December Friendly	Denmark	v	Zambia	Esbjerg, Denmark
14:00 UTC+1				Stadium: Esbjerg Stadium

- Fixtures and Results – Soccerway.com
- Global sport

== Coaching staff ==
=== Current coaching staff ===
As of 1 February 2025

Position	Name
Head coach	(Switzerland) Nora Häuptle
Assistant coach	(Switzerland) Philippe Hasler

=== Coaching history ===
- (Zambia) Charles Bwale (2014)
- (Zambia) Albert Kachinga (2014–2018)
- (Zambia) Bruce Mwape (2018–2025)
- (Switzerland) Nora Häuptle (2025–)

== Players ==
=== Current squad ===
The following players were called up for the 2026 WAFCON matches from 26 July through 16 August 2026. Caps and goals accurate up to and including 13 July 2025.

No.	Pos.	Player	Date of birth (age)	Club
1	GK	Catherine Musonda	20 February 1998 (aged 28)	(Football Association of Zambia) Red Arrows
2	DF	Saliya Mwanza	16 May 2007 (aged 19)	(Football Association of Zambia) Elite Ladies
3	DF	Lushomo Mweemba	10 April 2001 (aged 25)	(Turkish Football Federation) Hakkarigücü Spor
4	MF	Susan Banda	6 July 1990 (aged 36)	(Football Association of Zambia) Red Arrows
5	DF	Margaret Gondwe	1 December 2007 (aged 18)	(Football Association of Zambia) Green Buffaloes
6	MF	Rhoda Chileshe	8 May 1998 (aged 28)	(Football Association of Zambia) Indeni Roses F.C.
7	FW	Ochumba Lubandji	1 July 2001 (aged 25)	(Chinese Football Association) Fujian Quanzhou Nan'an
8	DF	Margaret Belemu	24 February 1997 (aged 29)	(Football Association of Zambia) Red Arrows
9	FW	Kabange Mupopo	21 September 1992 (aged 33)	(Chinese Football Association) Liaoning Shenbei Hefeng
10	MF	Grace Chanda	11 June 1997 (aged 29)	(Mexican Football Federation) Querétaro
11	FW	Barbra Banda (captain)	20 March 2000 (aged 26)	(United States Soccer Federation) Orlando Pride
12	MF	Evarine Katongo	29 December 2002 (aged 23)	(Israel Football Association) Hapoel Ra'anana
13	DF	Martha Tembo	8 March 1998 (aged 28)	(Israel Football Association) Hapoel Ra'anana
14	MF	Ireen Lungu	6 October 1997 (aged 28)	(Chinese Football Association) Sichuan
15	MF	Hellen Chanda	19 June 1998 (aged 28)	(Saudi Arabian Football Federation) Eastern Flames
16	GK	Hazel Nali	4 April 1998 (aged 28)	(Football Association of Zambia) ZESCO Ndola Girls
17	FW	Racheal Kundananji	3 June 2000 (aged 26)	(United States Soccer Federation) Bay FC
18	GK	Mwila Mufunte	7 September 2007 (aged 18)	(Football Association of Zambia) Green Buffaloes
19	DF	Siomala Mapepa	4 June 2002 (aged 24)	(Saudi Arabian Football Federation) Al-Taraji
20	DF	Racheal Nachula	14 January 1986 (aged 40)	(Football Association of Zambia) Green Buffaloes
21	MF	Avell Chitundu	30 June 1997 (aged 29)	(Football Association of Zambia) ZESCO Ndola Girls
22	FW	Eneless Phiri	2 June 2003 (aged 23)	(Football Association of Zambia) ZESCO Ndola Girls
23	DF	Blessing Maluba	26 March 2007 (aged 19)	(Football Association of Zambia) Nchanga Queens
24	FW	Mercy Chipasula	23 March 2008 (aged 18)	(Football Association of Zambia) ZESCO Ndola Girls
25	FW	Prisca Chilufya	8 June 1999 (aged 27)	(United States Soccer Federation) Angel City
26	FW	Fridah Mukoma	13 October 2006 (aged 19)	(Chinese Football Association) Beijing Jingtan

=== Recent call-ups ===
The following players had been called up to a squad in 12 months preceding the above draft.

Pos.	Player	Date of birth (age)	Caps	Goals	Club	Latest call-up
DF	Pauline Zulu	3 October 2004 (age 22)	3	0	(Zambia) ZANACO	v.Namibia, 26 October 2025
MF	Grace Chilenga	{{{age}}}	-	-	(Zambia)	v.Namibia, 26 October 2025
FW	Ngosa Chabwe	{{{age}}}	-	-	(Zambia)	v.Namibia, 26 October 2025

^{INJ} Injured player.
^{PRE} Preliminary squad.
^{RET} Retired from international football.
^{SUS} Suspended for the next match.
^{WD} Withdrew from the squad due to non-injury issue.
^{QUA} Placed in quarantine after a contact with COVID-19.

=== Previous squads ===
FIFA Women's World Cup

- 2023 FIFA Women's World Cup squads

Africa Women Cup of Nations

- 2022 Women's Africa Cup of Nations squads
- 2024 Women's Africa Cup of Nations squads
- 2026 Women's Africa Cup of Nations squads

COSAFA Women's Championship

- 2020 COSAFA Women's Championship squad
- 2022 COSAFA Women's Championship squad
- 2023 COSAFA Women's Championship squad
- 2024 COSAFA Women's Championship squad

Turkish Women's Cup

- 2023 Turkish Women's Cup squads

== Competitive record ==
=== FIFA Women's World Cup ===
Zambia made its World Cup debut on 22 July 2023.

Year	Round	Pld	W	D	L	GF	GA
(China) 1991	Did not enter						
(Sweden) 1995	Did not qualify						
(United States) 1999	Did not enter						
(United States) 2003	Did not qualify						
(China) 2007	Did not qualify						
(Germany) 2011	Did not enter						
(Canada) 2015	Did not qualify						
(France) 2019	Did not qualify						
(Australia) (New Zealand) 2023	Group stage	3	1	0	2	3	11
(Brazil) 2027	Did not qualify						
(Mexico) (United States) 2031	To be determined						
(United Kingdom) 2035	To be determined						
Total	1/12	3	1	0	2	3	11

=== Olympic Games ===
Year	Round	Pld	W	D	L	GF	GA
(United States) 1996	Did not qualify						
(Australia) 2000	Did not enter						
(Greece) 2004	Did not enter						
(China) 2008	Did not enter						
(United Kingdom) 2012	Did not qualify						
(Brazil) 2016	Did not qualify						
(Japan) 2020	Group stage	3	0	1	2	7	15
(France) 2024	Group stage	3	0	0	3	6	13
(United States) 2028	To be determined						
(Australia) 2032	To be determined						
Total	2/5	6	0	1	5	13	28

=== Africa Women's Cup of Nations ===
Year	Round	Pld	W	D	L	GF	GA
1991	Withdrew						
1995	Quarter-finals	2	0	0	2	5	11
(Nigeria) 1998	Did not enter						
(South Africa) 2000	Did not enter						
(Nigeria) 2002	Did not qualify						
(South Africa) 2004	Did not enter						
(Nigeria) 2006	Did not qualify						
(Equatorial Guinea) 2008	Did not qualify						
(South Africa) 2010	Did not enter						
(Equatorial Guinea) 2012	Did not qualify						
(Namibia) 2014	Group stage	3	0	1	2	1	9
(Cameroon) 2016	Did not qualify						
(Ghana) 2018	Group stage	3	1	1	1	6	5
(Morocco) 2022	Third place	6	3	2	1	7	3
(Morocco) 2024	Quarter-finals	4	2	1	1	6	9
(Morocco) 2026	Group stage	3	2	0	1	8	2
Total:6/16	Third place	21	8	5	8	33	39

=== African Games ===
Year	Round	Pld	W	D	L	GF	GA
(Nigeria) 2003	Did not enter						
(Algeria) 2007	Did not enter						
(Mozambique) 2011	Did not qualify						
(Republic of the Congo) 2015	Did not qualify						
(Morocco) 2019	See Zambia women's national under-20 football team						
(Ghana) 2023	See Zambia women's national under-20 football team						
Total	0/4	0	0	0	0	0	0

=== COSAFA Championship ===
Year	Round	Pld	W	D*	L	GF	GA	GD
(Zimbabwe) 2002	3rd							
(Zambia) 2006	3rd							
(Angola) 2008								
(Zimbabwe) 2011	Group stage	3	1	0	2	5	7	−1
(Zimbabwe) 2017	3rd	5	2	3	0	18	9	+2
(South Africa) 2018	4th	5	3	0	2	6	2	+2
(South Africa) 2019	Runners-up	5	3	1	1	22	3	+19
(South Africa) 2020	3rd	3	1	0	2	9	3	+6
(South Africa) 2021	3rd	5	3	2	0	11	2	+9
(South Africa) 2023	Runners-up	5	3	1	1	10	4	+6
(South Africa) 2025	Third Place	5	3	1	1	8	3	+3
Total		35	18	8	9	89	33	+46

*Draws include knockout matches decided via penalty shoot-out.

=== Turkish Cup ===
Year	Round	Pld	W	D	L	GF	GA	GD
2021	Withdrew							
Total								

== Honours ==
- Women's Africa Cup of Nations

Third place: (1) 2022
