= Eneless Phiri =

Zambian footballer (born 2003)

Personal information
- Date of birth: 2 June 2003 (age 23)
- Position: Midfielder

Team information
- Current team: ZESCO Ndola Girls
- Number: 7

Youth career
- –: Police Doves

Senior career*
Years	Team	Apps	(Gls)
–	Nkwazi Queens		
–	ZESCO Ndola Girls		

International career
–2023	Zambia U/20		
–	Zambia		(2)
- * Club domestic league appearances and goals

Eneless Phiri (born 2 June 2003) is a Zambian footballer who plays as a winger for FAZ Women's Super Division side ZESCO Ndola Girls and the Zambian women's national team.

Phiri was the player of the tournament at the 2025 CAF Women's Champions League COSAFA.

== Club career ==
In 2022 she moved to Nkwazi Queens from Police Doves. In 2025 she appeared with ZESCO Ndola Girls at the 2025 CAF Women's Champions League COSAFA where they finished as runners-up. Phiri was later named the best player the tournament becoming the first Zambian player to be named best player.

== International career ==
In 2021 she was named in the Zambia U/20 squad to take on Malawi. She scored for the senior team against Zimbabwe in the Three Nations Tournament. On 28th July 2026, Eneless made her senior WAFCON debut against Egypt and scored in the 6-0 win.

=== International goals ===
No.	Date	Venue	Opponent	Score	Result	Competition
1.	26 October 2025	Levy Mwanawasa Stadium, Ndola, Zambia	Namibia	2–0	3–0	2026 Women's Africa Cup of Nations qualification
2.	2 December 2025	Bingu National Stadium, Lilongwe, Malawi	Zimbabwe	1–0	3–1	Three Nations Tournament
3.	2 December 2025	Bingu National Stadium, Lilongwe, Malawi	Zimbabwe	2–0	3–1	Three Nations Tournament
4.	28 July 2026	Rabat Olympic Stadium, Rabat, Morocco	Egypt	5–0	6–0	2026 Women's Africa Cup of Nations

== Honours ==
ZESCO Ndola Girls

- COSAFA Women's Champions League runners-up: 2025

Individual

- 2025 CAF Women's Champions League COSAFA Qualifiers: Best Player
