= Susan Banda =

Zambian footballer (born 1990)

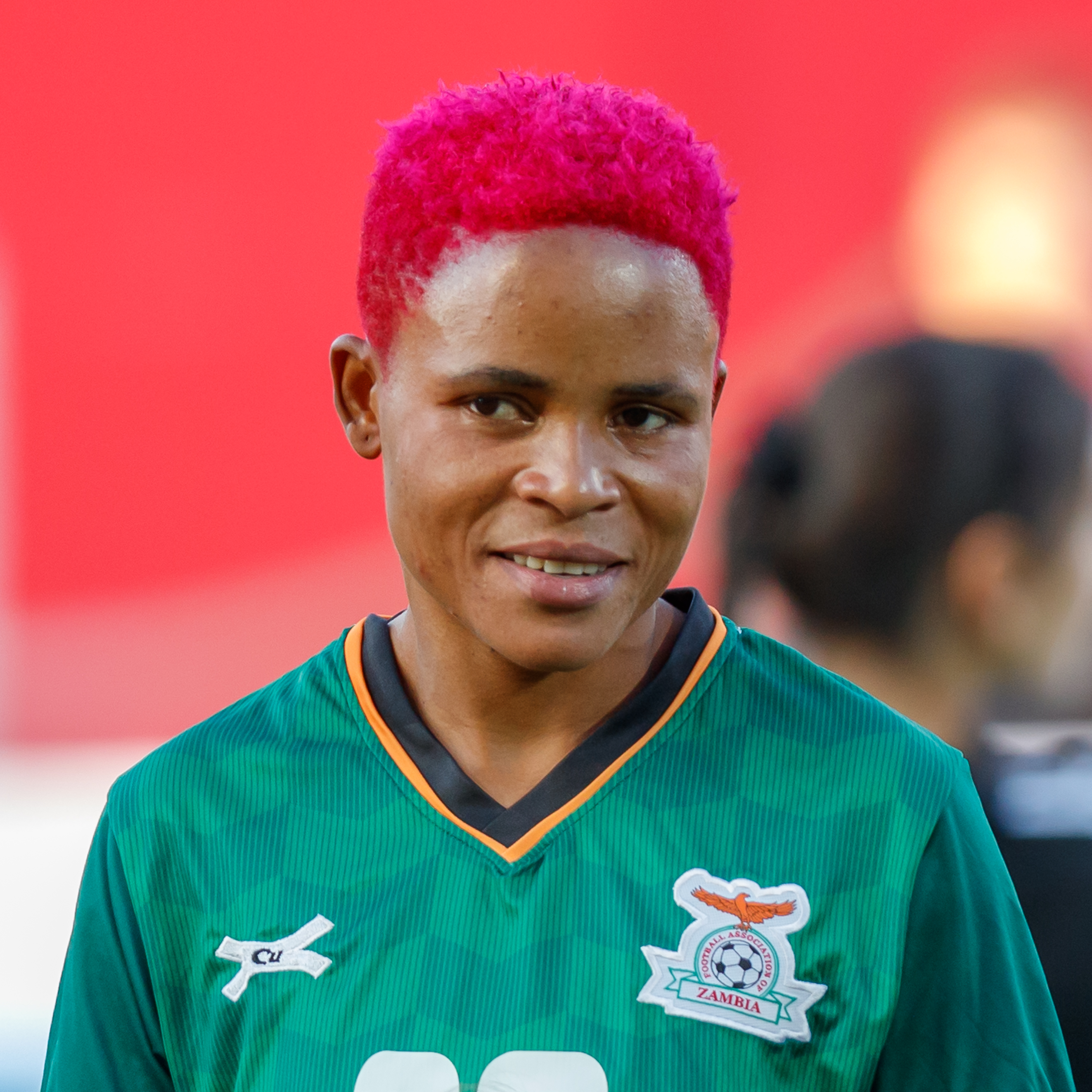
- 2023 at the national team

Personal information
- Date of birth: 6 July 1990 (age 36)
- Height: 1.58 m (5 ft 2 in)
- Position: Midfielder

Team information
- Current team: OFI Crete W.F.C.

Senior career*
Years	Team	Apps	(Gls)
–2024	Red Arrows		
2024–	OFI		

International career^{‡}
2011–	Zambia		
- * Club domestic league appearances and goals ‡ National team caps and goals as of 11 October 2014

Susan Banda (born 6 July 1990) is a Zambian footballer who plays as a midfielder for OFI in the Greek A Division and the Zambia women's national team. She was part of the team at the 2014 African Women's Championship.

Banda was named to the Zambia squad for the 2023 FIFA Women's World Cup.
