= Hazel Nali =

Zambian footballer (born 1998)

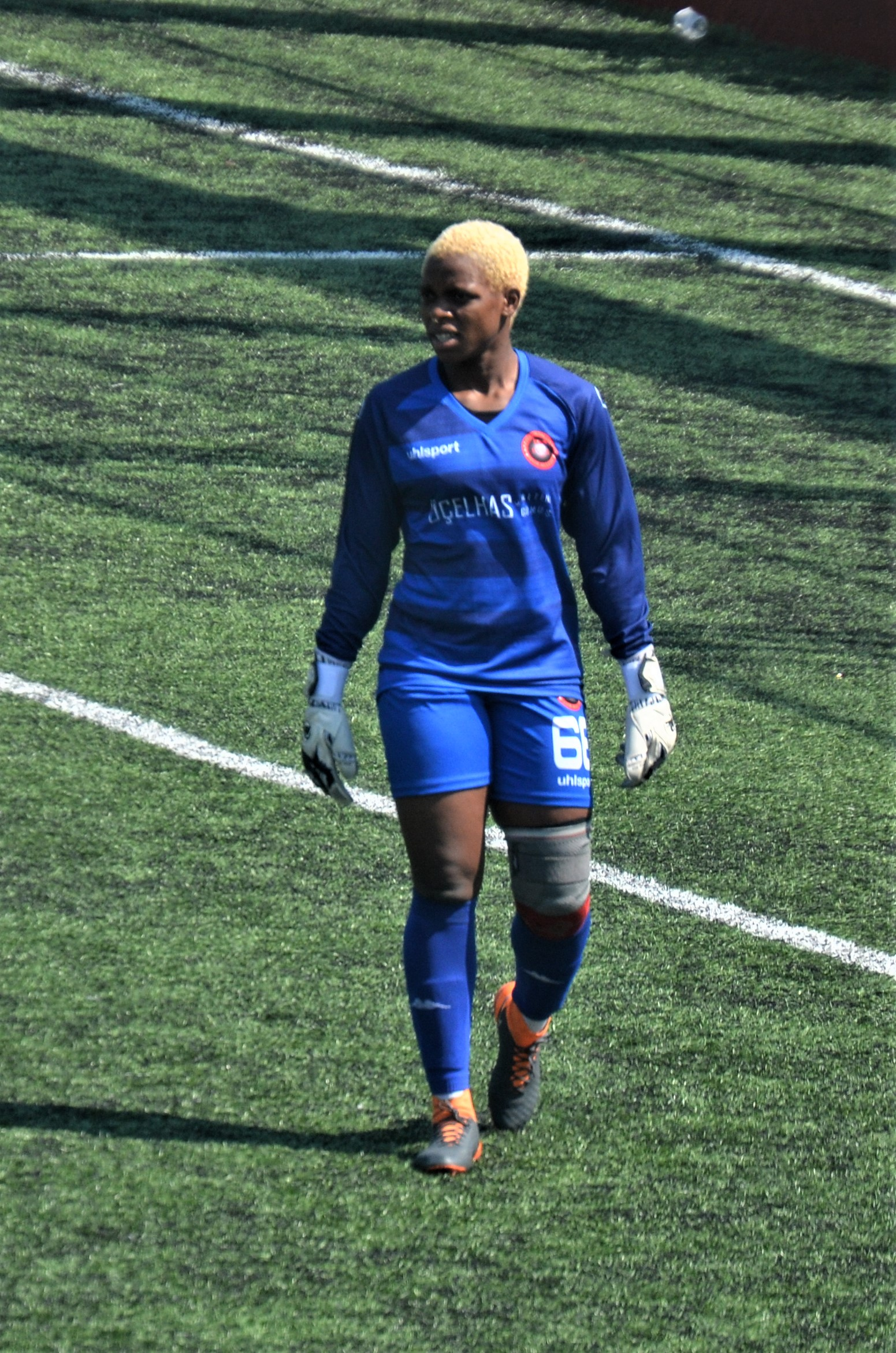
- Nali playing for Fatih Karagümrük SK in 2022

Personal information
- Full name: Hazel Natasha Nali
- Date of birth: 4 April 1998 (age 28)
- Place of birth: Zambia
- Position: Goalkeeper

Team information
- Current team: ZESCO Ndola Girls

Senior career*
Years	Team	Apps	(Gls)
- Chibolya Queens
2014–2015	Nchanga Queens		
2016–2017	Indeni Roses		
2018–2019	Green Buffaloes		
2019–2021	Hapoel Be'er Sheva		
2022–2023	Fatih Vatan Spor	23	(0)
2025–	ZESCO Ndola Girls		

International career
2014	Zambia U-17	3	(0)
2014–	Zambia		
Medal record
Representing Zambia
Women's Africa Cup of Nations
Third place	2022 Morocco
- * Club domestic league appearances and goals

Hazel Natasha Nali (born 4 April 1998) is a Zambian professional women's footballer who plays as a goalkeeper for ZESCO Ndola Girls in the FAZ Super Division and the Zambia women's national team. She played for the senior national team at the 2014 African Women's Championship at the 2018 Africa Women Cup of Nations, at the 2020 COSAFA Women's Championship, and at the 2020 Summer Olympics.

== Club career ==
At club level, Nali has played in Zambia for Chibolya Queens in Lusaka, for Nchanga Queens in Chingola, for Indeni Roses in Ndola, and for Green Buffaloes in Lusaka. In March 2020, she won the FAZ Women Super division with Green Buffaloes.

In November 2020, Nali joined Israeli club Hapoel Be'er Sheva who compete in the Ligat Nashim on a one-year deal. She started every one of the first games of the season and, in their sixth game, kept her first clean sheet to help the club claim their first victory of the season, beating Hapoel Ra'anana 2–0.

In March 2022, she moved to Turkey and joined the Istanbul-based club Fatih Vatan Spor to play in the second half of the 2021-22 Women's Super League season. She suffered an ACL tear and medial collateral ligament injury just days before the 2023 FIFA Women's World Cup and missed out on the next two seasons. In the summer of 2024, she signed for Greek club OFI, but her move fell through after uncertainty caused by her injury.

In July 2025, after being fully rehabilitated, she returned to Zambia to play for ZESCO Ndola Girls.

== International career ==
Nali played for Zambia's under-17 squad in the 2014 FIFA U-17 Women's World Cup. She played all three games for Zambia, losing 2–0 to Italy and 4–0 to Venezuela before beating Costa Rica 2–1.

In October 2014, Nali was named for Zambia's senior squad for the 2014 African Women's Championship.

In November 2018, Nali was called up for the 2018 Africa Women Cup of Nations.

In November 2020, Nali was called up for the 2020 COSAFA Women's Championship.

In July 2021, Nali was called up for Zambia's squad for the 2020 Summer Olympics.
