= Green Buffaloes Women F.C. =

Zambian women's football club

- Nickname: Nyanta Girls
- Founded: 2005
- Ground: Reiz Arena
- Capacity: 10,000
- Coordinates: Latitude: -15.365° Longitude: 28.366°
- Owner: Zambia Army
- President: Col. Lilian Maela
- League: FAZ Women's Super Division
| Home colours | Away colours | Third colours |

Green Buffaloes Women's Football Club is a Zambian women's professional football club affiliated to Green Buffaloes and based in Lusaka that competes in the FAZ Women's Super Division, the top tier of Zambian women's football. Sponsored by the Zambian Army, they play their home games at Arakan Barracks Ground.

== History ==
Domestically, Green Buffaloes has won a record 12 trophies; 7 in the Lusaka League and 5 in the Zambian National Championship. Green Buffaloes won the first two Women's Super Division titles in 2020 and 2021, gaining qualification for the first two editions of the COSAFA Women's Champions League. The finished as semi-finalists in the inaugural edition and won the title in 2022, the latter which gained them qualification for the 2022 CAF Women's Champions League where there they were drawn in Group A with the 2022 host nation's team AS FAR, Simba Queens and Determine Girls.

== Players ==
=== Current squad ===
As of 13 October 2024

Note: Flags indicate national team as defined under FIFA eligibility rules; some limited exceptions apply. Players may hold more than one non-FIFA nationality.

| No. | Pos. | Nation | Player |
|---|---|---|---|
| 1 | GK | ZAM | Aisha Gama |
| 2 | RB | ZAM | Esther Siamfuko |
| 3 | RB | ZAM | Martha Banda |
| 4 | DF | ZAM | Memory Nthala (Captain) |
| 5 | CB | ZAM | Esther Banda |
| 6 | LW | MAW | Sarah Mulimbika |
| 9 | CF | ZIM | Ethel Chinyerere |
| 10 | CAM | ZAM | Maweta Chilenga |
| 11 | RW | ZAM | Agness Phiri |
| 12 | DM | ZAM | Evarine Katongo |
| 13 | CF | ZAM | Regina Kayamboma |
| 14 | CAM | ZAM | Natasha Nanyangwe |
| 27 | CB | ZAM | Patricia Lampi |
| 27 | LB | ZAM | Nana Malanda |
| 27 | CB | ZAM | Esther Banda |
| 11 | RW | ZAM | Maweta Chilenga |
| 47 | CM | ZAM | Margret Chisenga |
| 7 | RW | ZAM | Natasha Kasema |
| 27 | CF | ZAM | Aundra Kashala |
| 27 | DM | ZAM | Agness Musesa |

| No. | Pos. | Nation | Player |
|---|---|---|---|
| 16 | MF | ZAM | Joana Benaya |
| 18 | GK | ZAM | Aisha Mbwana |
| 27 | GK | ZAM | Mwila Chishala Mufunte |
| 18 | CF | ZAM | Agness Ondya |
| 27 | CB | ZAM | Victory Mbali |
| 27 | RW | ZAM | Elizabeth Mofya |
| 19 | CAM | ZAM | Lydia Shamalima |
| 15 | CB | ZAM | Margret Gondwe |
| 20 | LB | ZAM | Rachael Nachula |
| 22 | FW | ZAM | Diana Banda |
| 23 | RB | ZAM | Lweendo Hanongo |
| 24 | CB | BOT | Mokgabo Onneile Thanda |
| 26 | CB | MAW | Vast Phiri |
| 27 | CB | ZAM | Jessy Zulu |
| 28 | FW | ZAM | Theresa Chewe |
| 30 | CF | ZAM | Mary Mbewe |

=== Current technical staff ===
| Position | Staff |
|---|---|
| Head coach | Charles Haalubono |
| Assistant coach | Carol Kanyemba |
| Assistant coach | Lubinda Luwilu |
| Fitness coach | Sydney Lombe |
| Goalkeeping coach | Borniface Banda |

Last updated: 13 September 2022
Source: Official squad line-up picture from Facebook

== Honours ==
=== Domestic ===
- FAZ Women's Super Division: 2019−20
- Lusaka League (7): 2011, 2013, 2015, 2016, 2017, 2018, 2019
- Zambia National Championship (5): 2016, 2018, 2019, 2021, 2022

=== International ===
- COSAFA Women's Champions League (1): 2022

== See also ==
- Green Buffaloes F.C.
- FAZ Women's Super Division
- COSAFA Women's Champions League
