= Nora Häuptle =

Swiss footballer and manager (born 1983)

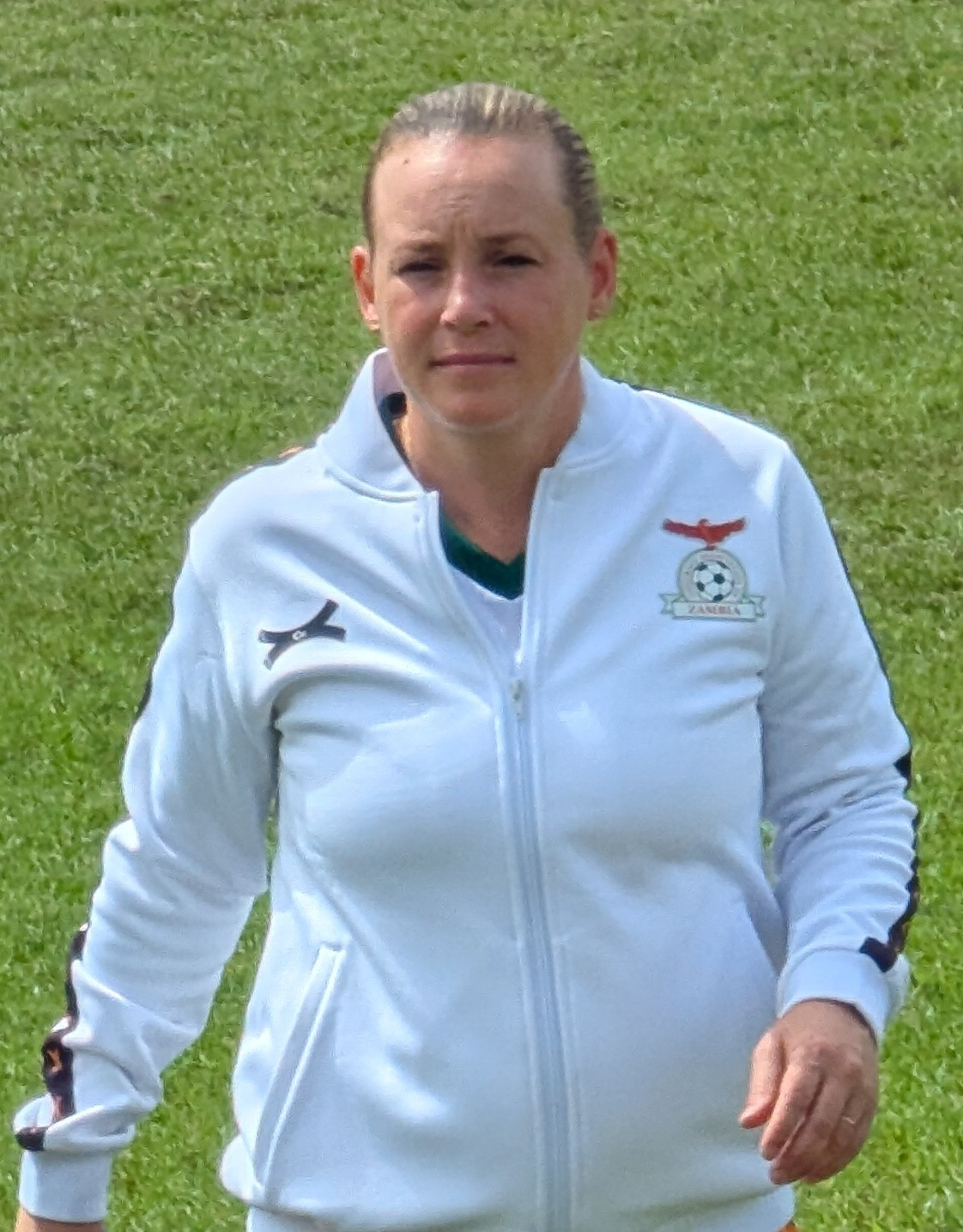
- Häuptle in 2025

Personal information
- Date of birth: 9 September 1983 (age 43)
- Place of birth: Horn, Switzerland
- Height: 1.68 m (5 ft 6 in)
- Position: Defender

Team information
- Current team: Zambia women (head coach)

Youth career
- 1992–1994: FC Steinach
- 1994–1996: FC Goldbach
- 1996–1997: St. Gallen

Senior career*
Years	Team	Apps	(Gls)
1997–2003	St. Gallen		
2003–2005	YB Frauen		
2005–2008	Zuchwil 05		
2008	Twente		
2009–2010	Rot-Schwarz Thun		

International career
2007–2009	Switzerland		

Managerial career
- 2009–2012: Thun (youth)
- 2015–2020: Switzerland U19 women
- 2020–2021: SC Sand
- 2021–2022: Israel women
- 2023–2025: Ghana women
- 2025–: Zambia women
- * Club domestic league appearances and goals

Nora Häuptle (born 9 September 1983) is a Swiss football manager and former player who is in charge of the Zambia women's national team since 4 January 2025.

In her playing career, Häuptle played as a defender. She started out at St. Gallen before moving on to play for BSC YB Frauen and FFC Zuchwil 05, all in Switzerland. She later moved to Netherlands to play for FC Twente Enschede. Returning to the Switzerland, she joined FC Rot-Schwarz Thun in addition to subsequently starting her coaching career with the U14-U15 Boys teams.

Häuptle has also been working as a pundit for SRF zwei.

== Playing career ==
Häuptle grew up in Horn in the canton of Thurgau. She played for FC Staad, BSC YB Frauen, FFC Zuchwil 05, FC Twente Enschede, FC Thun and the Switzerland national football team between 1996 and 2010.

== Coaching career ==
Häuptle went into coaching in her final season at FC Thun. She was assigned as the coach for the U-14 and U-15 boys' teams and an athletic coach for the U-12 to U-18 boys' teams from 2009 to 2012. At the same time, she studied sports and theater studies at the University of Bern. She then worked as a conditioning coach for tennis player Romina Oprandi.

=== Swiss U19 women ===
In July 2015, she was hired by Peter Knäbel, the Technical Director of the Swiss Football Association, as coach of the U19 women's national team. The following year, at the UEFA Women's Under-19 Championship, she led team to the semi-finals of the 2016 UEFA Women's Under-19 Championship, unearthing players including future Swiss internationals; Camille Surdez, Géraldine Reuteler, Naomi Mégroz and Cinzia Zehnder. She led the team during the 2018 UEFA Women's Under-19 Championship. The team missed out on the semi-finals after picking up four points via a win over Norway and a draw with France. Through the competition she helped on unearthing future top players; Alisha Lehmann, Nadine Riesen and Elvira Herzog, among others. She served in that role until September 2020.

=== SC Sand ===
In 2018, Häuptle obtained the UEFA Pro coaching license. On 24 August 2020 she took over the coaching position at SC Sand in the Frauen-Bundesliga. She was the only female coach in the Bundesliga at the time. Four games before the end of the 2020–21 season, Nora Häuptle was released from SC Sand in April 2021 and was succeeded by Alexander Fischinger.

=== Israel women ===
On 1 November 2021, Häuptle took up the position as Israel women's national coach and first-ever technical director of women's football in Israel. She tasked with the responsibility for the growth and development of the women's football for all ages groups, coaching the senior team, managing the Girls Football Academy whilst conducting and spearheading coaching courses in women's football. The appointment also made her the first Swiss woman to take over a national team abroad. She later resigned from this post at the end of January for personal reasons. The Israeli sports media felt that, the Israeli FA did not co-operate or agree with Häuptle on her decisions within that short stint which caused her to request for a termination of her contract.

=== Ghana women ===
In the summer of 2022, she served as technical advisor to the Ghana U-20 national team during the FIFA U-20 Women's World Cup in Costa Rica. Ghana were eliminated after the preliminary round after three defeats and a goal difference of 1:9.

On 5 January 2023, the Ghana Football Association announced the appointment of Häuptle as the manager of the Ghana women's national team, replacing Mercy Tagoe-Quarcoo who had been in charge since 2019. Her immediate task is to take the team through the 2024 Women’s Africa Cup of Nations qualifiers and qualify them for the 2024 Women's Africa Cup of Nations along with winning the 2023 WAFU Zone B Women's Cup.

=== Zambia women ===
On 14 January 2025, the Football Association of Zambia announced Häuptle's appointment as the manager of the Zambia women's national football team, replacing Bruce Mwape who had been in charge since 2018.

== Television and punditry ==
In June 2015, Häuptle joined SRF zwei as a pundit ahead of the 2015 FIFA Women's World Cup. She has since then worked either as a studio or pitch side pundit for their coverage of the FIFA Women's World Cup, UEFA Women's Euro, UEFA European Football Championship, Swiss Women's Super League, FIFA World Cup and UEFA Womens Champions League and qualifiers of the respective competitions. Working with SRF zwei, she has covered major competitions including the 2017 UEFA Women's Euro, 2019 FIFA Women's World Cup, 2020–21 UEFA Women Euro Qualification, UEFA Euro 2020 and UEFA Women's Euro 2022 and 2022 FIFA World Cup.

== Managerial statistics ==
As of 20 January 2025

Managerial record by team and tenure
Team	From	To	Record				
Team	From	To	G	W	D	L	Win %
Switzerland U19	July 2015	September 2020	26	15	5	6	57.69%
SC Sand	August 2020	April 2021	20	3	2	15	15%
Ghana	5 January 2023	January 2025	15	11	0	4	73.33%
Zambia	4 January 2025	Present	0	0	0	0	0%

== Honours ==
=== Player ===
FFC Zuchwil 05

- Swiss Women's Super League: 2006–07
- Swiss Women's Cup runner-up: 2007

FC Rot-Schwarz Thun

- Swiss Women's Cup: 2009

=== Manager ===
Individual

- Swiss Olympic Youth team Coach Award: 2016
