= Mary Mbewe =

Zambian journalist

- Born: Zambia
- Citizenship: Zambia
- Occupation: Journalist
- Awards: Editorial Leadership Award for Africa

Mary Mbewe is a Zambian journalist. She is executive editor of the Daily Nation, and the first woman to serve as editor-in-chief of a major newspaper in Zambia. In 2020 the World Association of News Publishers awarded her the Women in News (WIN) Editorial Leadership Award for Africa.

== Life ==
Mwebe started as a journalist in 1991, working at the Zambia Daily Mail. In 2000 she became editor-in-chief of the Daily Mail, the first woman editor-in-chief in Zambia.

In May 2017 she joined the Daily Nation as executive editor.

Mwebe was a founder member of the Zambia Union of Journalists (ZUJ). She is a member of the Zambia Media Women Association (ZAMWA) and the Zambian Chapter of the Media Institute of Southern Africa (MISA).
