= Luo Guiping =

Chinese footballer

Personal information
- Full name: Luo Guiping
- Date of birth: 20 April 1993 (age 33)
- Height: 1.68 m (5 ft 6 in)
- Position: Midfielder

Team information
- Current team: Guangdong
- Number: 39

Senior career*
Years	Team	Apps	(Gls)
2020-	Guangdong Huijun	15	(1)

International career^{‡}
2012	China U20	3	(0)
2013–	China	2	(0)
- * Club domestic league appearances and goals ‡ National team caps and goals as of 12:22, 8 June 2019 (UTC)

Luo Guiping (born 20 April 1993) is a Chinese footballer who plays as a midfielder for Guangdong and the China women's national football team.

== International career ==
In 2013, Luo was included in China's squad for the 2013 Valais Women's Cup in Switzerland. She appeared as a substitute in both matches, with the team finishing as runners-up to New Zealand.

In May 2019, she was included in the squad for the 2019 FIFA Women's World Cup in France.
