= Football at the 2020 Summer Olympics – Women's tournament =

2020 Women's Olympic Football Tournament

Tournament details
- Host country: Japan
- Dates: 21 July – 6 August 2021
- Teams: 12 (from 6 confederations)
- Venue: 6 (in 6 host cities)

Final positions
- Champions: Canada (1st title)
- Runners-up: Sweden
- Third place: United States
- Fourth place: Australia

Tournament statistics
- Matches played: 26
- Goals scored: 101 (3.88 per match)
- Attendance: 13,913 (535 per match)
- Top scorer: (Netherlands) Vivianne Miedema (10 goals)

The women's football tournament at the 2020 Summer Olympics was held from 21 July to 6 August 2021. Originally, it was to be held from 22 July to 7 August 2020, but the Summer Olympics were postponed to the following year due to the COVID-19 pandemic. However, the official name of the games remains the 2020 Summer Olympics. It was the seventh edition of the women's Olympic football tournament. Together with the men's competition, the 2020 Summer Olympics football tournament was held at six stadiums in six cities in Japan. The final was hosted at the International Stadium in Yokohama. There were no player age restrictions for teams participating in the competition.

Germany, the winners of the previous edition, failed to qualify for the tournament after being eliminated in the quarter-finals of the 2019 FIFA Women's World Cup.

Canada won their first gold medal by defeating Sweden 3–2 in the penalty shoot-out after both teams drew 1–1 after extra time in the final. The United States won bronze, defeating Australia 4–3 in the bronze medal game.

== Schedule ==
Legend
G	Group stage	¼	Quarter-finals	½	Semi-finals	B	Bronze medal match	F	Gold medal match

Wed 21	Thu 22	Fri 23	Sat 24	Sun 25	Mon 26	Tue 27	Wed 28	Thu 29	Fri 30	Sat 31	Sun 1	Mon 2	Tue 3	Wed 4	Thu 5	Fri 6
G			G			G			¼			½			B	F

== Qualification ==
In addition to host nation Japan, eleven women's national teams qualified from six separate continental confederations. The Organising Committee for FIFA Competitions ratified the distribution of spots at their meeting on 14 September 2017.

For the first time, per the agreement between the four British football associations (England, Northern Ireland, Scotland, and Wales) for the women's team, Great Britain attempted to qualify for the Olympics through England's performance in the 2019 FIFA Women's World Cup (a procedure already successfully employed by Team GB in field hockey and rugby sevens). The team's only previous appearance was in the 2012 tournament in which they qualified automatically as hosts. Great Britain succeeded in qualifying as England were among the three best European teams. Scotland also qualified for the World Cup but under the agreement whereby the highest ranked home nation was nominated to compete for the purposes of Olympic qualification, their performance was not taken into account (Scottish, Welsh and Northern Irish players are eligible to be part of the Great Britain team at the Olympics).

Means of qualification	Dates^{2}	Venue(s)^{2}	Berth(s)	Qualified
Host nation	—N/a	—N/a	1	Japan
2018 Copa América	4–22 April 2018	Chile	1	Brazil
2018 OFC Nations Cup	18 November – 1 December 2018	New Caledonia	1	New Zealand
2019 FIFA Women's World Cup (as UEFA qualifying)	7 June – 7 July 2019	France	3	Netherlands; Sweden; Great Britain
2020 CONCACAF Olympic Qualifying Championship	28 January – 9 February 2020	United States	2	United States; Canada
2020 CAF Olympic Qualifying Tournament	5–10 March 2020	Multiple	1	Zambia
2020 AFC Olympic Qualifying Tournament	6–11 March 2020 & 8–13 April 2021	Multiple	2	Australia; China
CAF–CONMEBOL play-off	10–13 April 2021	Turkey	1	Chile
Total			12	

- ^2Dates and venues are those of final tournaments (or final round of qualification tournaments), various qualification stages may precede matches at these specific venues.

== Venues ==
The tournament was held in six venues across six cities:

- Ibaraki Kashima Stadium, Kashima
- Miyagi Stadium, Rifu
- Saitama Stadium 2002, Saitama
- Sapporo Dome, Sapporo
- Tokyo Stadium, Chōfu (Tokio Area)
- International Stadium Yokohama, Yokohama

The gold medal match was originally scheduled to be played at the Olympic Stadium in Tokyo. Both finalists requested a later kick-off time due to concerns about excessive heat; as the National Stadium was already booked for athletics events in the evening, the game was moved to the International Stadium Yokohama in Yokohama. Due to the COVID-19 pandemic in Japan, most matches were played behind closed doors without any spectators. However, Miyagi Stadium allowed a limited audience to attend matches and Kashima Stadium permitted local schoolchildren as part of the school program but Olympic spectators were still not allowed.

== Squads ==
The tournament was a full international tournament with no restrictions on age. Traditionally the roster rules required each team to submit a squad of 18 players, two of whom must be goalkeepers. Each team also named a list of four alternate players who could replace any player in the squad in case of injury during the tournament. In late June 2021, the International Olympic Committee and FIFA announced that all 22 players of each team would be available for selection before each match. Prior to each match, the teams chose from their total of 22 players, a roster of 18 players to be available for play in that match. The IOC also confirmed that a player must appear on at least one 18-player matchday roster to be considered an Olympian and to receive a medal. The rule change was made in regards to the challenges presented by the COVID-19 pandemic.

== Match officials ==
In June 2020, FIFA approved the use of the video assistant referee (VAR) system for the tournament. The match officials were announced on 23 April 2021.

Match officials
Confederation	Referee	Assistant referees
AFC	Kate Jacewicz (Australia)	Kim Kyong-min (South Korea); Lee Seul-gi (South Korea)
AFC	Yoshimi Yamashita (Japan)	Naomi Teshirogi (Japan); Makoto Bozono (Japan)
CAF	Salima Mukansanga (Rwanda)	Bernadettar Kwimbira (Malawi); Mary Njorge (Kenya)
CONCACAF	Melissa Borjas (Honduras)	Shirley Perelló (Honduras); Chantal Boudreau (Canada)
CONCACAF	Lucila Venegas (Mexico)	Mayte Chávez (Mexico); Enedina Caudillo (Mexico)
CONMEBOL	Edina Alves Batista (Brazil)	Neuza Back (Brazil); Mariana De Almeida (Argentina)
CONMEBOL	Laura Fortunato (Argentina)	Mónica Amboya (Ecuador); Mary Blanco (Colombia)
UEFA	Stéphanie Frappart (France)	Manuela Nicolosi (France); Michelle O'Neill (Republic of Ireland)
UEFA	Kateryna Monzul (Ukraine)	Maryna Striletska (Ukraine); Sanja Rodak (Croatia)
UEFA	Anastasia Pustovoitova (Russia)	Ekaterina Kurochkina (Russia); Lucie Ratajová (Czech Republic)
UEFA	Esther Staubli (Switzerland)	Susanne Küng (Switzerland); Katrin Rafalski (Germany)

Fourth officials
Confederation	Referee
CAF	Ndidi Patience Madu (Nigeria)
CAF	Maria Rivet (Mauritius)

Video assistant referees
Confederation	Video assistant referee
Male officials
AFC	Fu Ming (China PR)
AFC	Abdulla Al-Marri (Qatar)
AFC	Muhammad Taqi (Singapore)
CAF	Mahmoud Mohamed Ashour (Egypt)
CAF	Adil Zourak (Morocco)
CONCACAF	Edvin Jurisevic (United States)
CONCACAF	Erick Miranda (Mexico)
CONCACAF	Chris Penso (United States)
CONMEBOL	Andrés Cunha (Uruguay)
CONMEBOL	Nicolás Gallo (Colombia)
CONMEBOL	Wagner Reway (Brazil)
CONMEBOL	Mauro Vigliano (Argentina)
UEFA	Abdulkadir Bitigen (Turkey)
UEFA	Guillermo Cuadra Fernández (Spain)
UEFA	Marco Guida (Italy)
UEFA	Tiago Martins (Portugal)
UEFA	Benoît Millot (France)
UEFA	Paweł Raczkowski (Poland)
UEFA	Roi Reinshreiber (Israel)
Female officials
UEFA	Bibiana Steinhaus (Germany)

== Draw ==
The draw for the tournament was held on 21 April 2021, 10:00 CEST (UTC+2), at the FIFA headquarters in Zürich, Switzerland. It was conducted by Sarai Bareman, FIFA chief women's football officer, while Samantha Johnson presented the ceremony. Lindsay Tarpley and Ryan Nelsen acted as the draw assistants.

The 12 teams were drawn into three groups of four teams. The hosts Japan were automatically seeded into Pot 1 and assigned to position E1 while the remaining teams were seeded into their respective pots based on the FIFA Women's World Rankings released on 16 April 2021 (shown in parentheses below). As Great Britain are not a FIFA member and therefore do not have a ranking, they were seeded based on the FIFA ranking of England who qualified on behalf of Great Britain. However, all Great Britain matches were officially recognized by FIFA. No group could contain more than one team from each confederation.

Pot 1	Pot 2	Pot 3	Pot 4
Japan (11) (assigned to E1); United States (1); Netherlands (3)	Sweden (5); Great Britain (6); Brazil (7)	Canada (8); Australia (9); China (14)	New Zealand (22); Chile (37); Zambia (104)

== Group stage ==
The competing countries were divided into three groups of four teams, denoted as groups E, F and G to avoid confusion with the groups of the men's tournament (which use designations A to D). Teams in each group played one another in a round-robin basis, with the top two teams of each group and the two best third-placed teams advancing to the quarter-finals.

All times are local, JST (UTC+9).

=== Tiebreakers ===
The ranking of teams in the group stage was determined as follows:

1. Points obtained in all group matches (three points for a win, one for a draw, none for a defeat);
2. Goal difference in all group matches;
3. Number of goals scored in all group matches;
4. Points obtained in the matches played between the teams in question;
5. Goal difference in the matches played between the teams in question;
6. Number of goals scored in the matches played between the teams in question;
7. Fair play points in all group matches (only one deduction could be applied to a player in a single match):
  - Yellow card: −1 point;
  - Indirect red card (second yellow card): −3 points;
  - Direct red card: −4 points;
  - Yellow card and direct red card: −5 points;
8. Drawing of lots.

=== Group E ===
Pos	Team	Pld	W	D	L	GF	GA	GD	Pts	Qualification
1	Great Britain	3	2	1	0	4	1	+3	7	Advance to knockout stage
2	Canada	3	1	2	0	4	3	+1	5	Advance to knockout stage
3	Japan (H)	3	1	1	1	2	2	0	4	Advance to knockout stage
4	Chile	3	0	0	3	1	5	−4	0	

Source: TOCOG and FIFA
(H) Hosts
21 July 2021
16:30

Great Britain	2–0	Chile
White 18', 73'	Report (TOCOG); Report (FIFA)

Sapporo Dome, Sapporo
Attendance: 0
Referee: Salima Mukansanga (Rwanda)
21 July 2021
19:30

Japan	1–1	Canada
Iwabuchi 84'	Report (TOCOG); Report (FIFA)	Sinclair 6'

Sapporo Dome, Sapporo
Attendance: 0
Referee: Edina Alves Batista (Brazil)

24 July 2021
16:30

Chile	1–2	Canada
Araya 57' (pen.)	Report (TOCOG); Report (FIFA)	Beckie 39', 47'

Sapporo Dome, Sapporo
Attendance: 0
Referee: Esther Staubli (Switzerland)
24 July 2021
19:30

Japan	0–1	Great Britain
	Report (TOCOG); Report (FIFA)	White 74'

Sapporo Dome, Sapporo
Attendance: 0
Referee: Anastasia Pustovoitova (Russia)

27 July 2021
20:00

Chile	0–1	Japan
	Report (TOCOG); Report (FIFA)	Tanaka 77'

Miyagi Stadium, Rifu
Attendance: 1,326
Referee: Melissa Borjas (Honduras)
27 July 2021
20:00

Canada	1–1	Great Britain
Leon 55'	Report (TOCOG); Report (FIFA)	Prince 85' (o.g.)

Kashima Stadium, Kashima
Attendance: 0
Referee: Kateryna Monzul (Ukraine)

=== Group F ===
Pos	Team	Pld	W	D	L	GF	GA	GD	Pts	Qualification
1	Netherlands	3	2	1	0	21	8	+13	7	Advance to knockout stage
2	Brazil	3	2	1	0	9	3	+6	7	Advance to knockout stage
3	Zambia	3	0	1	2	7	15	−8	1	
4	China	3	0	1	2	6	17	−11	1	

Source: TOCOG and FIFA
21 July 2021
17:00

China	0–5	Brazil
	Report (TOCOG); Report (FIFA)	Marta 9', 74'; Debinha 22'; Andressa 82' (pen.); Beatriz 89'

Miyagi Stadium, Rifu
Attendance: 1,645
Referee: Kateryna Monzul (Ukraine)
21 July 2021
20:00

Zambia	3–10	Netherlands
Banda 19', 82', 83'	Report (TOCOG); Report (FIFA)	Miedema 9', 15', 29', 59'; Martens 14', 38'; Van de Sanden 44'; Roord 64'; Beerensteyn 75'; Pelova 80'

Miyagi Stadium, Rifu
Attendance: 1,822
Referee: Laura Fortunato (Argentina)

24 July 2021
17:00

China	4–4	Zambia
Wang Shuang 6', 22', 23', 84' (pen.)	Report (TOCOG); Report (FIFA)	Kundananji 15'; Banda 43' (pen.), 46', 69'

Miyagi Stadium, Rifu
Attendance: 2,212
Referee: Melissa Borjas (Honduras)
24 July 2021
20:00

Netherlands	3–3	Brazil
Miedema 3', 59'; Janssen 79'	Report (TOCOG); Report (FIFA)	Debinha 16'; Marta 65' (pen.); Ludmila 68'

Miyagi Stadium, Rifu
Attendance: 2,621
Referee: Kate Jacewicz (Australia)

27 July 2021
20:30

Netherlands	8–2	China
Van de Sanden 12'; Beerensteyn 37', 45+2'; Martens 47', 70'; Miedema 65', 76'; Pelova 71'	Report (TOCOG); Report (FIFA)	Wang Shanshan 28'; Wang Yanwen 69'

International Stadium Yokohama, Yokohama
Attendance: 0
Referee: Salima Mukansanga (Rwanda)
27 July 2021
20:30

Brazil	1–0	Zambia
Andressa 19'	Report (TOCOG); Report (FIFA)

Saitama Stadium 2002, Saitama
Attendance: 0
Referee: Yoshimi Yamashita (Japan)

=== Group G ===
Pos	Team	Pld	W	D	L	GF	GA	GD	Pts	Qualification
1	Sweden	3	3	0	0	9	2	+7	9	Advance to knockout stage
2	United States	3	1	1	1	6	4	+2	4	Advance to knockout stage
3	Australia	3	1	1	1	4	5	−1	4	Advance to knockout stage
4	New Zealand	3	0	0	3	2	10	−8	0	

Source: TOCOG and FIFA
21 July 2021
17:30

Sweden	3–0	United States
Blackstenius 25', 54'; Hurtig 72'	Report (TOCOG); Report (FIFA)

Tokyo Stadium, Chōfu
Attendance: 0
Referee: Yoshimi Yamashita (Japan)
21 July 2021
20:30

Australia	2–1	New Zealand
Yallop 20'; Kerr 33'	Report (TOCOG); Report (FIFA)	Rennie 90+1'

Tokyo Stadium, Chōfu
Attendance: 0
Referee: Lucila Venegas (Mexico)

24 July 2021
17:30

Sweden	4–2	Australia
Rolfö 20', 63'; Hurtig 52'; Blackstenius 82'	Report (TOCOG); Report (FIFA)	Kerr 36', 48'

Saitama Stadium 2002, Saitama
Attendance: 0
Referee: Edina Alves Batista (Brazil)
24 July 2021
20:30

New Zealand	1–6	United States
Hassett 72'	Report (TOCOG); Report (FIFA)	Lavelle 9'; Horan 45'; Erceg 63' (o.g.); Press 80'; Morgan 88'; Bott 90+3' (o.g.)

Saitama Stadium 2002, Saitama
Attendance: 0
Referee: Stéphanie Frappart (France)

27 July 2021
17:00

New Zealand	0–2	Sweden
	Report (TOCOG); Report (FIFA)	Anvegård 17'; Janogy 29'

Miyagi Stadium, Rifu
Attendance: 884
Referee: Laura Fortunato (Argentina)
27 July 2021
17:00

United States	0–0	Australia
	Report (TOCOG); Report (FIFA)

Kashima Stadium, Kashima
Attendance: 0
Referee: Anastasia Pustovoitova (Russia)

=== Ranking of third-placed teams ===
Pos	Grp	Team	Pld	W	D	L	GF	GA	GD	Pts	Qualification
1	E	Japan	3	1	1	1	2	2	0	4	Advance to knockout stage
2	G	Australia	3	1	1	1	4	5	−1	4	Advance to knockout stage
3	F	Zambia	3	0	1	2	7	15	−8	1	

Source: TOCOG and FIFA
Rules for classification: 1) Points; 2) Goal difference; 3) Goals scored; 4) Fair play points in all group matches; 5) Drawing of lots.

== Knockout stage ==
In the knockout stage, if a match was level at the end of normal playing time, extra time was played (two periods of 15 minutes each) and followed, if necessary, by a penalty shoot-out to determine the winner.

=== Bracket ===
Quarter-finals
30 July – Kashima
Great Britain	3
Australia (a.e.t.)	4
30 July – Saitama
Sweden	3
Japan	1
30 July – Yokohama
Netherlands	2 (2)
United States (p)	2 (4)
30 July – Rifu
Canada (p)	0 (4)
Brazil	0 (3)

Semi-finals
2 August – Yokohama
Australia	0
Sweden	1
2 August – Kashima
United States	0
Canada	1

Gold medal match
6 August – Yokohama
Sweden	1 (2)
Canada (p)	1 (3)
Bronze medal match
5 August – Kashima
Australia	3
United States	4

=== Quarter-finals ===
30 July 2021
17:00

Canada	0–0 (a.e.t.)	Brazil
	Report (TOCOG); Report (FIFA)
Penalties
Sinclair (penalty missed); Fleming (penalty scored); Lawrence (penalty scored); Leon (penalty scored); Gilles (penalty scored)	4–3	(penalty scored) Marta; (penalty scored) Debinha; (penalty scored) Érika; (penalty missed) Andressa; (penalty missed) Rafaelle

Miyagi Stadium, Rifu
Attendance: 3,403
Referee: Stéphanie Frappart (France)

30 July 2021
18:00

Great Britain	3–4 (a.e.t.)	Australia
White 57', 66', 115'	Report (TOCOG); Report (FIFA)	Kennedy 35'; Kerr 89', 106'; Fowler 103'

Kashima Stadium, Kashima
Attendance: 0
Referee: Salima Mukansanga (Rwanda)

30 July 2021
19:00

Sweden	3–1	Japan
Eriksson 7'; Blackstenius 53'; Asllani 68' (pen.)	Report (TOCOG); Report (FIFA)	Tanaka 23'

Saitama Stadium 2002, Saitama
Attendance: 0
Referee: Lucila Venegas (Mexico)

30 July 2021
20:00

Netherlands	2–2 (a.e.t.)	United States
Miedema 18', 54'	Report (TOCOG); Report (FIFA)	S. Mewis 28'; Williams 31'
Penalties
Miedema (penalty missed); Janssen (penalty scored); Van der Gragt (penalty scored); Nouwen (penalty missed)	2–4	(penalty scored) Lavelle; (penalty scored) Morgan; (penalty scored) Press; (penalty scored) Rapinoe

International Stadium Yokohama, Yokohama
Attendance: 0
Referee: Kate Jacewicz (Australia)

=== Semi-finals ===
2 August 2021
17:00

United States	0–1	Canada
	Report (TOCOG); Report (FIFA)	Fleming 75' (pen.)

Kashima Stadium, Kashima
Attendance: 0
Referee: Kateryna Monzul (Ukraine)

2 August 2021
20:00

Australia	0–1	Sweden
	Report (TOCOG); Report (FIFA)	Rolfö 46'

International Stadium Yokohama, Yokohama
Attendance: 0
Referee: Melissa Borjas (Honduras)

=== Bronze medal match ===
5 August 2021
17:00

Australia	3–4	United States
Kerr 17'; Foord 54'; Gielnik 90'	Report (TOCOG); Report (FIFA)	Rapinoe 8', 21'; Lloyd 45+1', 51'

Kashima Stadium, Kashima
Attendance: 0
Referee: Laura Fortunato (Argentina)

=== Gold medal match ===
6 August 2021
21:00

Sweden	1–1 (a.e.t.)	Canada
Blackstenius 34'	Report (TOCOG); Report (FIFA)	Fleming 68' (pen.)
Penalties
Asllani (penalty missed); Björn (penalty scored); Schough (penalty scored); Anvegård (penalty missed); Seger (penalty missed); Andersson (penalty missed)	2–3	(penalty scored) Fleming; (penalty missed) Lawrence; (penalty missed) Gilles; (penalty missed) Leon; (penalty scored) Rose; (penalty scored) Grosso

International Stadium Yokohama, Yokohama
Referee: Anastasia Pustovoitova (Russia)

== Statistics ==
=== Goalscorers ===
There were 101 goals scored in 26 matches, for an average of 3.88 goals per match.

10 goals

- (Netherlands) Vivianne Miedema

6 goals

- (Australia) Sam Kerr
- (United Kingdom) Ellen White
- (Zambia) Barbra Banda

5 goals

- (Sweden) Stina Blackstenius

4 goals

- (China) Wang Shuang
- (Netherlands) Lieke Martens

3 goals

- (Brazil) Marta
- (Netherlands) Lineth Beerensteyn
- (Sweden) Fridolina Rolfö

2 goals

- (Brazil) Andressa
- (Brazil) Debinha
- (Canada) Janine Beckie
- (Canada) Jessie Fleming
- (Japan) Mina Tanaka
- (Netherlands) Victoria Pelova
- (Netherlands) Shanice van de Sanden
- (Sweden) Lina Hurtig
- (United States) Carli Lloyd
- (United States) Megan Rapinoe

1 goal

- (Australia) Caitlin Foord
- (Australia) Mary Fowler
- (Australia) Emily Gielnik
- (Australia) Alanna Kennedy
- (Australia) Tameka Yallop
- (Brazil) Beatriz
- (Brazil) Ludmila
- (Canada) Adriana Leon
- (Canada) Christine Sinclair
- (Chile) Karen Araya
- (China) Wang Shanshan
- (China) Wang Yanwen
- (Japan) Mana Iwabuchi
- (Netherlands) Dominique Janssen
- (Netherlands) Jill Roord
- (New Zealand) Betsy Hassett
- (New Zealand) Gabi Rennie
- (Sweden) Anna Anvegård
- (Sweden) Kosovare Asllani
- (Sweden) Magdalena Eriksson
- (Sweden) Madelen Janogy
- (United States) Lindsey Horan
- (United States) Rose Lavelle
- (United States) Sam Mewis
- (United States) Alex Morgan
- (United States) Christen Press
- (United States) Lynn Williams
- (Zambia) Racheal Kundananji

1 own goal

- (Canada) Nichelle Prince (against Great Britain)
- (New Zealand) CJ Bott (against United States)
- (New Zealand) Abby Erceg (against United States)

Source: TOCOG

=== Discipline ===
A player was automatically suspended for the next match for the following offences:

- Receiving a red card (red card suspensions could be extended for serious offences)
- Receiving two yellow cards in two matches; yellow cards expired after the completion of the quarter-finals (yellow card suspensions were not carried forward to any other future international matches)

The following offences warranted a suspension during the tournament:

Player	Offence(s)	Suspension
(Zambia) Martha Tembo	(red card) in qualifying vs Cameroon (10 March 2020)	Group F vs Netherlands (matchday 1; 21 July 2021)
(China) Li Qingtong	(red card) in Group F vs Zambia (matchday 2; 24 July 2021)	Group F vs Netherlands (matchday 3; 27 July 2021)
(Zambia) Lushomo Mweemba	(red card) in Group F vs Brazil (matchday 3; 27 July 2021)	Suspension served outside tournament
(Brazil) Ludmila	(yellow card) in Group F vs Netherlands (matchday 2; 24 July 2021); (yellow card) in Quarter-finals vs Canada (30 July 2021)	Team eliminated from tournament
(Canada) Jayde Riviere	(yellow card) in Group E vs Great Britain (matchday 3; 27 July 2021); (yellow card) in Quarter-finals vs Brazil (30 July 2021)	Semi-finals vs United States (2 August 2021)
(Australia) Ellie Carpenter	(red card) in Semi-finals vs Sweden (2 August 2021)	Bronze medal match vs United States (5 August 2021)

=== Tournament ranking ===
Per statistical convention in football, matches decided in extra time are counted as wins and losses, while matches decided by penalty shoot-outs are counted as draws.

Pos	Grp	Team	Pld	W	D	L	GF	GA	GD	Pts	Final result
1	E	Canada	6	2	4	0	6	4	+2	10	Gold medal
2	G	Sweden	6	5	1	0	14	4	+10	16	Silver medal
3	G	United States	6	2	2	2	12	10	+2	8	Bronze medal
4	G	Australia	6	2	1	3	11	13	−2	7	Fourth place
5	F	Netherlands	4	2	2	0	23	10	+13	8	Eliminated in quarter-finals
6	F	Brazil	4	2	2	0	9	3	+6	8	Eliminated in quarter-finals
7	E	Great Britain	4	2	1	1	7	5	+2	7	Eliminated in quarter-finals
8	E	Japan (H)	4	1	1	2	3	5	−2	4	Eliminated in quarter-finals
9	F	Zambia	3	0	1	2	7	15	−8	1	Eliminated in group stage
10	F	China	3	0	1	2	6	17	−11	1	Eliminated in group stage
11	E	Chile	3	0	0	3	1	5	−4	0	Eliminated in group stage
12	G	New Zealand	3	0	0	3	2	10	−8	0	Eliminated in group stage

Source: TOCOG
(H) Hosts
