= Nonjabulo Nonhle Ndlela =

South African referee

- Born: 3 February 1992 (age 34); New Hanover, KwaZulu-Natal, South Africa

Domestic
Years	League	Role
2012-	SAFA Regional League	Referee
2018-	Sasol League	Referee
2019-	SAFA Women's League	Referee

International
Years	League	Role
2022-	FIFA	Referee
2021-	CAF	Referee

Nonjabulo Nonhle Ndlela (born 3 February 1992) is an international football referee from South Africa who is a listed international referee for FIFA since 2022.

Ndlela attended Khanyisani Primary School and Mpolweni Secondary School.

She was voted referee of the tournament at the 2022 Sasol League National Championship. She later made it on the FIFA referees list in 2022.

She officiated the 2024 Women's Africa Cup of Nations qualification match between Rwanda and Ghana.

== Honours ==
- 2022 Sasol League National Championship: Referee of the Tournament
