= FAZ Women's Super Division =

Women football division in Zambia

FAZ Women Super Division
- Founded: 1999
- Country: Zambia
- Confederation: CAF
- Number of clubs: 18
- Level on pyramid: 1-3
- International cup: COSAFA / CAF W-Champions League
- Current champions: Green Buffaloes Ladies FC (2022-2023)
- Most championships: Green Buffaloes Ladies FC (6 titles)
- Current: 2025–26

The FAZ Women Super Division is the highest league of women's football in Zambia. It was established in the beginning of 2021 and is run by FAZ. The inaugural season featured 12 teams from four provinces in Zambia. The super division replaced the 4 regional women's leagues (Copperbelt, Lusaka, North-west and Central) as the highest level of women's football in Zambia, while the regional leagues dropped to the second tier. In November 2022 a new nationalwide division one was created, serving as the second tier and dropping the regional leagues to the third tier.

The teams for the first season of the super division were selected from an application process where FAZ granted spots in the league for fully structured teams that were expected to be able to complete the full season. The creation of the league came from a wider promotion of the women's game in a promising era of Zambian women's football with the Copper Queens qualified for the Tokyo Olympic games. It was also a response to the newly announced CAF Women's Champions League, where the best teams of the continent are competing and started later in 2021.

== Past champions ==
The Women's Football League in Zambia dates back to the beginning of the 1980s when women competed in Copperbelt province. The national league began in January 1984, according to RSSSF, with teams "mostly from Copperbelt towns: Luanshya, Mufulira (Mufulira Flying Queens), Kitwe (Kitwe Flying Angels), Ndola, Kalulushi, Chililabombwe (Konkola Blades) and Chingola."

The Football Association of Zambia became involved in the national league held from 1999 for a few seasons, and the Lusaka Zambia Women Football Championship Cup was held from 2005 to 2007.

In the beginning of the 90s Copperbelt football died out while it instead was introduced in Lusaka at the end of the decade and Kabwata EDUSPORT United was an early dominant of the game. Since then, women have competed in various competitions, predominantly in the Copperbelt and Lusaka, with the following champions:

Year	Copperbelt	Lusaka	Lusaka Cup	National
2002		Lass Connect FC		
2005			Arrows	
2006			National Assembly Women	
2007			National Assembly Women	
2011		Green Buffaloes Women		
2013		Green Buffaloes Women		
2014	Moba Queens			
2015	Zesco Ndola Girls	Green Buffaloes Women		
2016	Indeni Roses	Green Buffaloes Women		Green Buffaloes Women^{a}
2017	Zesco Ndola Girls	Green Buffaloes Women		
2018	Indeni Roses	Green Buffaloes Women		Green Buffaloes Women^{b}
2019	Indeni Roses	Green Buffaloes Women		Green Buffaloes Women^{c}
2019−20	Abandoned due to COVID-19 pandemic			

- ^aFirst national championship final played between Copperbelt champion and Lusaka champion
- ^bGreen Buffaloes Women won the Inaugural Charity Shield 2019 (played between 2018 champions in Copperbelt and Lusaka province league) over Indeni Roses and was announced national champions 2018
- ^cFirst national championship play-offs played between province league champions from Copperbelt, Lusaka, North-west, and Central.

=== Super Division champions ===
Year	National	Notes
2020–21	Green Buffaloes Women	First ever Super Division edition
2021–22	Green Buffaloes Women	Won over Yasa Queens on penalties in play-off Final
2022–23	Green Buffaloes Women	Won after taking the lead from Red Arrows on the final day
2023–24	Green Buffaloes Women	

== Clubs in the 2022-2023 season ==
The third edition of the national league was won by Green Buffaloes and were contested by the following 18 clubs:

Club	Province	Final position current season	Position previous season 2021/22	First season	First season of current spell	Number of seasons in Super Division	Best Finishing position
Bauleni United Sports Academy	Lusaka	15	5 Zone B	2020/21	2020/21	3	6 (2020/21)
Green Buffaloes Women	Lusaka	1	1 Zone A	2020/21	2020/21	3	1 (2022/23)
Green Eagles	Southern	11	7 Zone B	2021/22	2021/22	2	11 (2022/23)
Indeni Roses	Copperbelt	6	2 Zone A	2020/21	2020/21	3	3 (2021/22)
Elite Ladies - Lusaka Dynamos Women	Lusaka	4	4 Zone B	2020/21	2020/21	3	4 (2022/23)
Mufulira Wanderers Women	Copperbelt	18	7 Zone A	2020/21	2020/21	3	12 (2020/21)
National Assembly Women	Lusaka	9	6 Zone A	2020/21	2020/21	3	9 (2022/23)
Nkwazi Queens	Lusaka	12	5 Zone A	2020/21	2020/21	3	8 (2020/21)
Play it Forward Queens	Southern	16	Southern Province 1st	2022/23	2022/23	1	16 (2022/23)
Police Doves Queens	North-Western	8	4 Zone A	2020/21	2020/21	3	8 (2022/23)
Prison Leopards Queens	Central	17	8 Zone B	2021/22	2021/22	2	15 (2021/22)
Queens Academy	Central	13	6 Zone B	2020/21	2020/21	3	10 (2020/21)
Red Arrows Women	Lusaka	2	2 Zone B	2020/21	2020/21	3	2 (2022/23)
Trident Queens	North-Western	10	North-West Province 1st	2022/23	2022/23	1	10 (2022/23)
YASA Queens	Lusaka	7	1 Zone B	2020/21	2020/21	3	2 (2021/22)
Zanaco Ladies	Lusaka	5	Lusaka Province 1st	2022/23	2022/23	1	5 (2022/23)
Zesco Ndola Girls	Copperbelt	3	3 Zone A	2020/21	2020/21	3	3 (2022/23)
ZISD Queens	Lusaka	14	3 Zone B	2020/21	2020/21	3	6 (2021/22)

== Lower tiers of the football piramid ==
=== National League ===
The national division one League was introduced in the 2022–2023 season, and was played in two zones with 8 teams each. The league serves as the second tier of the Zambian football piramid for women.

Champions of the first season was Luyando in the South Zone and Police Blue Eagles in the North Zone.

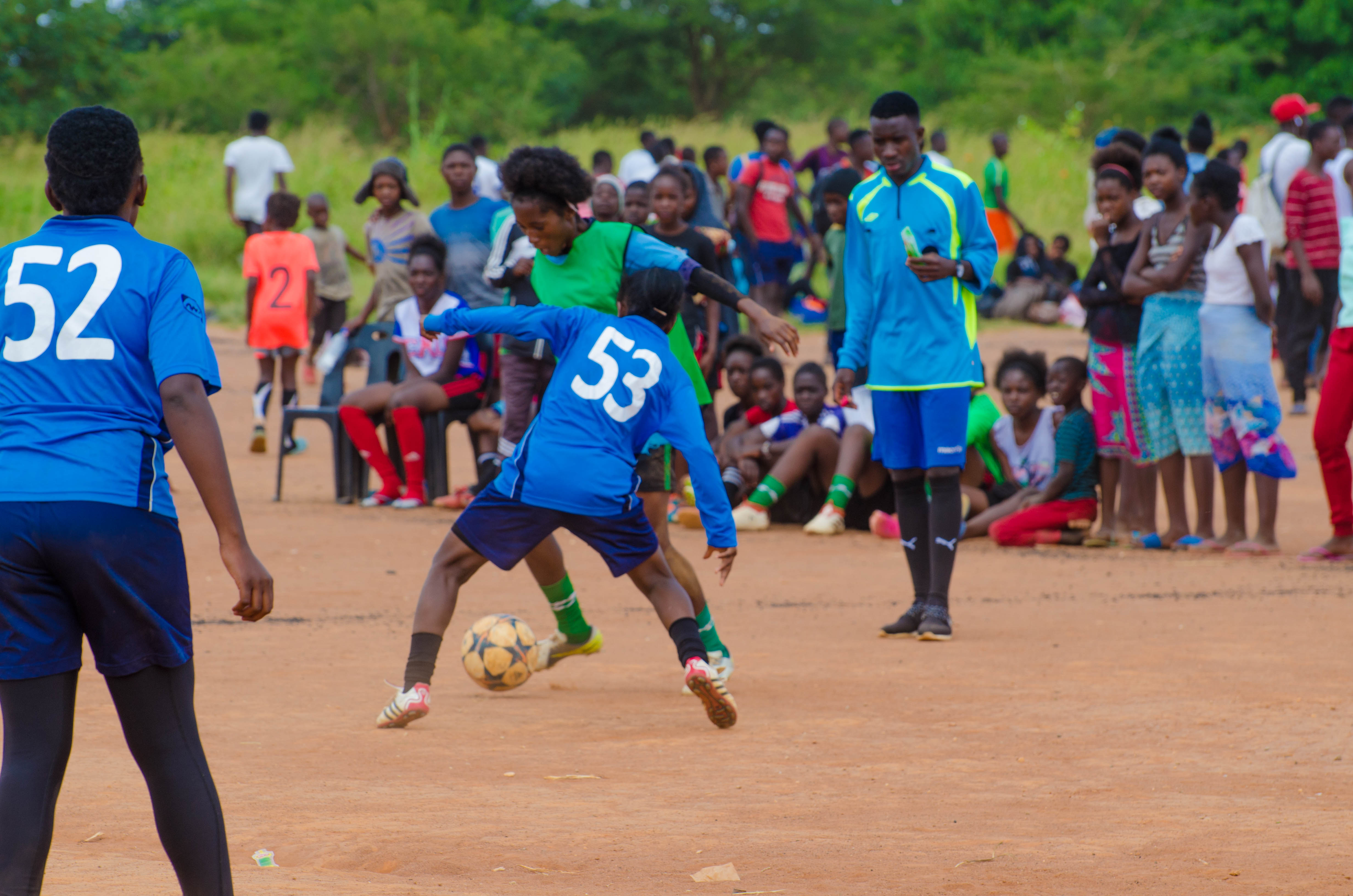
Football training session, 2019

=== Regional Leagues ===
Serving as the third tier of Zambian female football is leagues divided by provinces. Earlier the top tier was organised like this but with the introduction of the Super division and National division one League, the regional football is feeding the nationalwide tiers.
