= Vast Phiri =

Zambian footballer (born 1996)

Personal information
- Date of birth: 3 February 1996 (age 30)
- Height: 1.50 m (4 ft 11 in)
- Position: Defender

Team information
- Current team: ZESCO United
- Number: 19

International career^{‡}
Years	Team	Apps	(Gls)
2018–	Zambia	4	(0)
- ‡ National team caps and goals as of 16 June 2019

Vast Phiri (born 3 February 1996) is a Zambian international footballer who plays as a defender for the Zambia women's national football team. She competed for Zambia at the 2018 Africa Women Cup of Nations, playing in one match.

== International career ==
Phiri was called up to the Zambia squad for the 2018 Women's Africa Cup of Nations.

On 2 July 2021, Phiri was called up to the 23-player Zambia squad for the delayed 2020 Summer Olympics.

Phiri was named to the Zambia squad for the 2023 FIFA Women's World Cup.

On 3 July 2024, Phiri was called up to the Zambia squad for the 2024 Summer Olympics.

== Honours ==
Zambia

- COSAFA Women's Championship: 2022
