= 2024 COSAFA Women's Championship squads =

The 2024 COSAFA Women's Championship is an international women's association football tournament set to be held in Gqeberha, South Africa from 22 October to 2 November 2024. The 14 national teams involved in the tournament were required to register a squad of 23 players. Only players in these squads were eligible to take part in the tournament.

The age listed for each player is on 22 October 2024, the first day of the tournament. The numbers of caps and goals listed for each player do not include any matches played after the start of the tournament. The club listed is the club for which the player last played a competitive match prior to the tournament. A flag is included for coaches who are of a different nationality than their own national team.

== Group A ==
=== South Africa ===
The final 21-player squad was announced on 8 October 2024.

Head coach: Maude Khumalo

No.	Pos.	Player	Date of birth (age)	Club
1	GK	Jessica Williams	2 December 1999 (aged 24)	(South African Football Association) Badgers
2	DF	Asanda Hadebe	13 October 2003 (aged 21)	(South African Football Association) Mamelodi Sundowns
3	DF	Sikelelwa Mhlanga	23 May 2006 (aged 18)	(South African Football Association) City Lads
4	DF	Ntando Phahla	12 March 2006 (aged 18)	(South African Football Association) Tuks
5	DF	Yolanda Nduli	18 January 2003 (aged 21)	(South African Football Association) UJ FC
6	MF	Thalea Smidt	27 December 1997 (aged 26)	(South African Football Association) Tuks
7	MF	Ayesha Moosa	30 October 2003 (aged 20)	(South African Football Association) UJ FC
8	MF	Isabella Ludwig	13 December 2002 (aged 21)	(South African Football Association) Tuks
9	MF	Tshogofatso Motlogelwa	29 April 2000 (aged 24)	(South African Football Association) TUT Matsatsantsa
10	MF	Gugu Dhlamini	9 September 2005 (aged 19)	(South African Football Association) UJ FC
11	MF	Kesha Hendricks	29 November 2005 (aged 18)	(South African Football Association) University of Fort Hare
12	FW	Tanna Hollis	27 November 2005 (aged 18)	(South African Football Association) JVW
13	FW	Nobahle Mdelwa	26 June 2008 (aged 16)	(South African Football Association) Lindelani Ladies
14	MF	Sibongile Ntoane	2 July 2003 (aged 21)	(South African Football Association) TUT Matsatsantsa
15	MF	Mmabatho Mogale	8 July 2005 (aged 19)	(South African Football Association) JVW
16	GK	Matshidiso Masebe	29 September 2003 (aged 21)	(South African Football Association) UJ FC
17	MF	Sinamile Mkhwanazi	6 January 2004 (aged 20)	(South African Football Association) Tuks
18	DF	Shannon Macomo	28 April 2004 (aged 20)	(South African Football Association) UJ FC
19	DF	Khutso Pila	31 May 2000 (aged 24)	(South African Football Association) Tuks
20	FW	Samkelisiwe Selana	7 July 2004 (aged 20)	(South African Football Association) TS Galaxy Queens
21	GK	Nokuphumula Mpatsiyana	17 May 1997 (aged 27)	(South African Football Association) University of Fort Hare

=== Namibia ===
An initial 31-player preliminary squad was named on 4 October 2024. The final 20-player squad was announced on 20 October 2024.

Head coach: Woody Jacobs

No.	Pos.	Player	Date of birth (age)	Club
1	GK	Melissa Matheus	14 June 1998 (aged 26)	(Namibia Football Association) Beauties
3	DF	Iina Katuta	16 December 1986 (aged 37)	(Namibia Football Association) NAMPOL Ladies
4	DF	Julia Rutjindo	18 April 2000 (aged 24)	(Namibia Football Association) Ongos
5	DF	Eddelsisingh Naris	8 November 1996 (aged 27)	(Namibia Football Association) Ongos
6	DF	Utuzuvira Kahiriri	2 December 2004 (aged 19)	(Namibia Football Association) Beauties
7	MF	Twelikondjele Amukoto	28 July 1991 (aged 33)	(Namibia Football Association) NAMPOL Ladies
8	FW	Zenatha Coleman (Captain)	25 September 1993 (aged 31)	(Turkish Football Federation) Beylerbeyi
9	MF	Kylie Van Wyk	1 May 1999 (aged 25)	(Namibia Football Association) Girls & Goals
10	MF	Millicent Hikuam	6 July 1998 (aged 26)	(United States Soccer Federation) Capital
11	MF	Anna Somses	14 August 2005 (aged 19)	(Namibia Football Association) V-Power Angels
12	FW	Shanice Daries	3 September 2000 (aged 24)	(Namibia Football Association) Girls & Goals
14	FW	Ivone Kooper	16 January 1999 (aged 25)	(Namibia Football Association) Ongos
15	DF	Lydiana Nanamus	30 November 1998 (aged 25)	(Namibia Football Association) Ongos
16	GK	Agnes Kauzuu	22 December 1992 (aged 31)	(Namibia Football Association) Ongos
17	MF	Memory Ngonda	11 February 1998 (aged 26)	(Namibia Football Association) Ongos
18	FW	Julliana Blou	19 May 1995 (aged 29)	(Namibia Football Association) Ongos
19	FW	Anna Shikusho	5 April 1995 (aged 29)	(Namibia Football Association) Ongos
20	DF	Lovisa Mulunga	18 March 1995 (aged 29)	(Namibia Football Association) Ongos
21	MF	Asteria Angula	11 June 1999 (aged 25)	(Namibia Football Association) Arrows Ladies
22	FW	Fiola Vliete	22 October 1998 (aged 26)	(Namibia Football Association) Beauties

=== Eswatini ===
The final 19-player squad was announced on 19 October 2024.

Head coach: Bongani Makhukhula

No.	Pos.	Player	Date of birth (age)	Club
1	GK	Gcinile Dlamini	10 June 2003 (aged 21)	(Eswatini Football Association) Young Buffaloes
2	DF	Badelise Ngozo	27 June 1997 (aged 27)	(Eswatini Football Association) Young Buffaloes
3	DF	Khulekile Mamba	14 May 1999 (aged 25)	(Eswatini Football Association) Green Mamba
4	MF	Nokuthula Ndlovu	4 October 2000 (aged 24)	(Eswatini Football Association) Green Mamba
5	DF	Bongekile Nkambule	21 June 2005 (aged 19)	(Eswatini Football Association) Wanderers
6	MF	Sisanda Ndzinisa	31 May 2002 (aged 22)	(Eswatini Football Association) Young Buffaloes
7	DF	Nomvula Sanga	15 September 1988 (aged 36)	(Eswatini Football Association) Young Buffaloes
8	MF	Londiwe Maziya	5 August 2004 (aged 20)	(Eswatini Football Association) Wanderers
9	FW	Nonhle Simelane	16 March 1997 (aged 27)	(Eswatini Football Association) Green Mamba
10	GK	Nonduduzo Mhlanga	1 February 2002 (aged 22)	(Eswatini Football Association) Wanderers
11	DF	Ngimphiwe Cele	3 June 1997 (aged 27)	(Eswatini Football Association) Wanderers
12	FW	Tenanile Ngcamphalala	15 February 1998 (aged 26)	(Eswatini Football Association) Young Buffaloes
13	DF	Simangele Sikhondze	5 February 2002 (aged 22)	(Eswatini Football Association) Young Buffaloes
14	MF	Simile Marks	7 May 2002 (aged 22)	(Eswatini Football Association) Young Buffaloes
16	MF	Gugulethu Mkhabela	25 March 2003 (aged 21)	(Eswatini Football Association) Green Mamba
17	DF	Futhie Dlamini	11 July 1993 (aged 31)	(Eswatini Football Association) Young Buffaloes
18	FW	Celiwe Nkambule (Captain)	19 February 1993 (aged 31)	(Eswatini Football Association) Young Buffaloes
19	MF	Sebenele Shabangu	9 August 1999 (aged 25)	(Eswatini Football Association) Green Mamba
20	DF	Samkelisiwe Fakudze	6 August 2004 (aged 20)	(Eswatini Football Association) Nsingizini

=== Seychelles ===
The final 22-player squad was announced on 19 October 2024.

Head coach: (Singapore) Chris Yip-Au

No.	Pos.	Player	Date of birth (age)	Club
1	GK	Kurchia Poris	6 June 2004 (aged 20)	(Seychelles Football Federation) Seychelles
2	MF	Chatina Esparon	9 December 1998 (aged 25)	(Seychelles Football Federation) Marine Victoria City
3	MF	Paula Moustache	24 May 1991 (aged 33)	(Seychelles Football Federation) Mont Fleuri Rovers
4	MF	Alisha Matatiken	13 March 2003 (aged 21)	(Seychelles Football Federation) Seychelles
5	DF	Nerlice Fred	18 May 1999 (aged 25)	(Seychelles Football Federation) Mont Fleuri Rovers
6	FW	Samira Florentine	20 February 1996 (aged 28)	(Seychelles Football Federation) Marine Victoria City
7	MF	Pascalina Moustache (Captain)	23 May 1991 (aged 33)	(Lithuanian Football Federation) FK Saned
8	MF	Rachel Cadeau	4 August 2008 (aged 16)	(Seychelles Football Federation) Marine Victoria City
9	DF	Sheryl Benoit	23 February 2009 (aged 15)	(Seychelles Football Federation) Young Kestrel
10	DF	Kimbelly Chan-Tak-Hue	3 May 2006 (aged 18)	Seychelles U17
11	DF	Farisha Pierre	11 December 2010 (aged 13)	(Seychelles Football Federation) Young Kestrel
12	DF	Guyra Boniface	4 August 2008 (aged 16)	(Seychelles Football Federation) Mont Fleuri Rovers
13	DF	Elielle Francoise	5 June 2009 (aged 15)	(Seychelles Football Federation) Young Kestrel
14	DF	Itarra Lagrenade	26 December 2002 (aged 21)	(Seychelles Football Federation) Mont Fleuri Rovers
15	FW	Elvina Hoareau	21 July 2008 (aged 16)	Seychelles U16
16	MF	Lisa Dubois	31 May 2007 (aged 17)	(Seychelles Football Federation) Young Kestrel
17	DF	Keisha Moustache	4 May 2009 (aged 15)	(Seychelles Football Federation) Young Kestrel
18	GK	Dinara Julie	4 August 2008 (aged 16)	Seychelles U16
19	DF	Anaelle Dorasamy	9 March 2007 (aged 17)	(Seychelles Football Federation) Marine Victoria City
20	DF	Clara Libanotis	12 May 2009 (aged 15)	Seychelles U16
21	DF	Emma Esparon	1 October 1998 (aged 26)	(Seychelles Football Federation) Young Kestrel
22	DF	Mahasiah Labrosse	12 April 2007 (aged 17)	(Seychelles Football Federation) Mont Fleuri Rovers

== Group B ==
=== Malawi ===
An initial 38-player preliminary squad was named on 9 October 2024. The final 23-player squad was announced on 21 October 2024.

Head coach: Lovemore Fazili

No.	Pos.	Player	Date of birth (age)	Club
1	GK	Mercy Sikelo	22 December 1997 (aged 26)	(Football Association of Malawi) Ntopwa
2	DF	Faith Chimzimu	21 February 2007 (aged 17)	(Football Association of Malawi) Ascent Academy
3	MF	Pililani Malora	23 December 1997 (aged 26)	(Football Association of Malawi) Nyasa Big Bullets
4	FW	Chisomo Banda	3 November 2003 (aged 20)	(Football Association of Malawi) Silver Strikers
5	DF	Patricia Nyirenda (Captain)	8 April 1998 (aged 26)	(Football Association of Malawi) MDF
6	MF	Jessie Yosefe	7 October 2004 (aged 20)	(Football Association of Malawi) CIVO
7	MF	Asimenye Simwaka	8 August 1997 (aged 27)	(Football Association of Malawi) MDF
8	MF	Tendai Saini	11 January 2004 (aged 20)	(Football Association of Malawi) Nyasa Big Bullets
9	FW	Sabina Thom	3 March 1996 (aged 28)	(Congolese Association Football Federation) TP Mazembe
10	DF	Maureen Kenneth	28 October 2007 (aged 16)	(Football Association of Malawi) Ascent Academy
11	FW	Catherine Kachala	21 October 2001 (aged 23)	(Football Association of Malawi) MDF
12	MF	Lyna James	23 November 1998 (aged 25)	(Football Association of Malawi) Nyasa Big Bullets
13	FW	Vanessa Chikupila	2 April 1996 (aged 28)	(Football Association of Zambia) Green Buffaloes
14	DF	Maggie Chavula	28 April 2005 (aged 19)	(Football Association of Malawi) Ascent Academy
15	MF	Leticia Chinyamula	12 June 2006 (aged 18)	(Football Association of Malawi) Ascent Academy
16	GK	Esther Maulidi	3 February 2008 (aged 16)	(Football Association of Malawi) Mighty Mukuru Wanderers
17	MF	Sara Mulimbika	11 January 2007 (aged 17)	(Football Association of Malawi) Ndirande
18	FW	Mary Chavinda	27 December 1998 (aged 25)	(Rwanda Football Federation) Rayon Sports
19	MF	Carolyne Mathyola	3 May 1999 (aged 25)	(Football Association of Malawi) Silver Strikers
20	MF	Funny Magombo	5 April 2005 (aged 19)	(Football Association of Malawi) Ntopwa
21	DF	Rose Alufandika	4 November 2005 (aged 18)	(Football Association of Malawi) Ntopwa
22	DF	Benadetta Mkandawire	28 September 2003 (aged 21)	(Football Association of Malawi) Nyasa Big Bullets
23	GK	Yamikani Kamanga	11 October 2004 (aged 20)	(Football Association of Malawi) MDF

=== Botswana ===
An initial 31-player preliminary squad was named on 9 October 2024.

Head coach: Alex Basimanebotlhe Malete

No.	Pos.	Player	Date of birth (age)	Club
1	GK	Tlamelo Pheresi	30 November 1996 (aged 27)	(Botswana Football Association) Gaborone United
2	DF	Kesegofetse Mochawe	20 July 1996 (aged 28)	(Botswana Football Association) Gaborone United
3	MF	Nancy Baeletsi	21 March 1996 (aged 28)	(Botswana Football Association) Gaborone United
4	DF	Masego Montsho	15 June 1991 (aged 33)	(Chinese Football Association) Henan
5	FW	Leungo Senwelo	23 December 2001 (aged 22)	(Botswana Football Association) Mazöttie
6	MF	Golebaone Selebatso	22 March 1991 (aged 33)	(Botswana Football Association) Gaborone United
7	FW	Yaone Modise	9 December 2005 (aged 18)	(Botswana Football Association) Gaborone United
8	DF	Lone Gaofetoge	16 July 2001 (aged 23)	(Turkish Football Federation) Hakkarigücü Spor
9	DF	Mokgabo Thanda	3 April 1993 (aged 31)	(Football Association of Zambia) Green Buffaloes
10	FW	Lesego Radiakanyo	27 June 1999 (aged 25)	(Botswana Football Association) Double Action
11	FW	Michelle Abueng	6 May 2001 (aged 23)	(Botswana Football Association) BDF XI
12	MF	Obonetse Rathari	11 November 2002 (aged 21)	(Botswana Football Association) Double Action
13	FW	Keitumetse Dithebe	17 July 2002 (aged 22)	(Botswana Football Association) Gaborone United
14	DF	Veronicah Mogotsi	21 August 1992 (aged 32)	(Botswana Football Association) Double Action
15	FW	Balotlhanyi Johannes	28 June 1994 (aged 30)	(Botswana Football Association) Double Action
16	GK	Sedilame Boseja (Captain)	1 December 1997 (aged 26)	(South African Football Association) Mamelodi Sundowns
17	FW	Jessica Maponga	24 February 2004 (aged 20)	(Botswana Football Association) Gaborone United
18	FW	Nondi Mahlasela	25 December 1991 (aged 32)	(Botswana Football Association) Prisons XI
19	MF	Laone Moloi	26 November 2000 (aged 23)	(Botswana Football Association) Gaborone United
20	FW	Gaonyadiwe Ontlametse	12 January 2000 (aged 24)	(Botswana Football Association) Gaborone United
21	MF	Tshegofatso Mosotho	19 June 2002 (aged 22)	(Botswana Football Association) Mazöttie
22	DF	Boitumelo Gammu	23 July 1995 (aged 29)	(Namibia Football Association) FC Ongos
23	GK	Lesego Moeng	3 February 1998 (aged 26)	(Namibia Football Association) FC Ongos

=== Madagascar ===
The final 23-player squad was announced on 17 October 2024.

Head coach: Hortensia Mamihasina

No.	Pos.	Player	Date of birth (age)	Club
1	GK	Verasantatra Andrianandrasana	30 June 1993 (aged 31)	(Comoros Football Federation) Olympic de Moroni
2	DF	Sylvania Nomenjanahary	1 January 2002 (aged 22)	(Malagasy Football Federation) TMT
3	DF	Mamy Razafindrabe	19 March 1993 (aged 31)	(Malagasy Football Federation) SabNam
4	DF	Anajrasoa Velomanantsolo	7 September 1993 (aged 31)	(Comoros Football Federation) Étoile du Centre
5	DF	Thérèse Tolizafy (Captain)	26 November 1990 (aged 33)	(Malagasy Football Federation) Diana
6	DF	Véronique Raharimalala	27 February 1987 (aged 37)	(Malagasy Football Federation) SabNam
7	FW	Suraya Ali	14 June 1996 (aged 28)	(Comoros Football Federation) Olympic de Moroni
8	MF	Solomampionona Mamonjy	29 May 2002 (aged 22)	(Comoros Football Federation) Olympic de Moroni
9	MF	Louisa Nambininjanahary	11 June 2005 (aged 19)	(Malagasy Football Federation) Canon
10	MF	Aimée Razanampiavy	25 December 1996 (aged 27)	(Comoros Football Federation) Olympic de Moroni
11	FW	Mamisoa Rasoarimalala	27 May 2000 (aged 24)	(Malagasy Football Federation) Disciples
12	DF	Haingo Ny Kanto Randrianarivelo	22 July 2000 (aged 24)	(Malagasy Football Federation) SabNam
13	MF	Nomenjanahary Raharimampionona	28 November 1998 (aged 25)	(Comoros Football Federation) Volcan
14	MF	Zira Adilayah	15 August 2002 (aged 22)	(Malagasy Football Federation) SabNam
15	DF	Geneviève Razafindramidina	12 November 1986 (aged 37)	(Malagasy Football Federation) SabNam
16	GK	Anastasie Soanarivo	5 February 2005 (aged 19)	(Malagasy Football Federation) ASCUF
17	DF	Rediny	1 January 2000 (aged 24)	(Malagasy Football Federation) AFC
18	MF	Julie Solonilaina	28 January 1995 (aged 29)	(Malagasy Football Federation) ASCUF
19	MF	Iriko Rakotoarimanana	1 January 2000 (aged 24)	(Malagasy Football Federation) Disciples
20	DF	Jocelyne Zafisambondaoky	1 January 2001 (aged 23)	(Luxembourg Football Federation) Red Star Merl-Belair
21	DF	Finaritra Vololoniaina	20 January 2003 (aged 21)	(Malagasy Football Federation) ASKA/AFA
22	MF	Marie Volanaharinjanahary	1 January 2001 (aged 23)	(Malagasy Football Federation) ASKA/AFA
23	FW	Marie Rasoanandrasana	27 May 1996 (aged 28)	(Comoros Football Federation) Olympic de Moroni

=== Mauritius ===
The final 23-player squad was announced on 18 October 2024.

Head coach: Kersley Levrai

No.	Pos.	Player	Date of birth (age)	Club
1	GK	Chaya Codoychurn	23 March 2004 (aged 20)	(Mauritius Football Association) MFA / SLB HPC U20
2	MF	Marie Laura Bridoux	15 June 1995 (aged 29)	(Mauritius Football Association) Plaisance Spoutnik
3	DF	Marie Anaëlle Rassoie	8 February 1992 (aged 32)	(Mauritius Football Association) Plaisance Spoutnik
4	FW	Jerusha Ramasawmy	8 January 2003 (aged 21)	(Mauritius Football Association) MFA / SLB HPC U20
5	DF	Elsa Laeticia Dadard	5 December 1994 (aged 29)	(Mauritius Football Association) AS Quatre Bornes
6	MF	Julie Gopal	10 April 2006 (aged 18)	(French Football Federation) FC Lorient
7	MF	Clothilde Élodie Aliphon (Captain)	16 October 1992 (aged 32)	(Mauritius Football Association) AS Quatre Bornes
8	DF	Marie Anaïs Fourneu	26 August 1998 (aged 26)	(Mauritius Football Association) AS Quatre Bornes
9	MF	Bibi Nausheen Mamode	18 March 1992 (aged 32)	(Mauritius Football Association) AS Malherbes
10	MF	Marie Ambre Apollon	12 July 2006 (aged 18)	(Mauritius Football Association) MFA / SLB HPC U20
11	MF	Melissa Crins	9 March 1989 (aged 35)	(Royal Belgian Football Association) Royal Wallonia
12	MF	Maelie Lessard	12 July 2007 (aged 17)	(Mauritius Football Association) Futuro FC Academy
13	DF	Eva Pierrot	26 January 2005 (aged 19)	(Mauritius Football Association) MFA / SLB HPC U20
14	MF	Fawellina Fiona Felicite	1 October 2002 (aged 22)	(Mauritius Football Association) AS Quatre Bornes
15	DF	Marie Orphélie Marianne	15 April 2001 (aged 23)	(Mauritius Football Association) Plaisance Spoutnik
16	GK	Marie Noël Edmond	24 December 1992 (aged 31)	(Mauritius Football Association) AS Malherbes
17	MF	Marie Yeuldi Friquin	20 February 2000 (aged 24)	(Mauritius Football Association) Grand Port New Generation
18	DF	Marie Annaëlle Auguste	1 August 2005 (aged 19)	(Mauritius Football Association) MFA / SLB HPC U20
19	MF	Marie Emilie Macaque	5 May 1993 (aged 31)	(Mauritius Football Association) Plaisance Spoutnik
20	DF	Marie Chloé Desveaux	9 September 2006 (aged 18)	(Mauritius Football Association) MFA / SLB HPC U20
21	FW	Marie Adriana Rosette	4 June 2006 (aged 18)	(Mauritius Football Association) MFA / SLB HPC U20
22	MF	Marie Audrey Anthony	15 September 1990 (aged 34)	(Mauritius Football Association) AS Quatre Bornes
23	GK	Noemie Victoria Brasse	20 July 2004 (aged 20)	(Mauritius Football Association) US Trou aux Biches

== Group C ==
=== Zambia ===
An initial 38-player preliminary squad was named on 8 October 2024. The final 23-player squad was announced on 17 October 2024.

Head coach: Florence Mwila

No.	Pos.	Player	Date of birth (age)	Club
1	GK	Chimwemwe Mwale	18 July 1997 (aged 27)	(Football Association of Zambia) Red Arrows
2	DF	Melody Kipimpi	1 December 1996 (aged 27)	(Football Association of Zambia) ZESCO Ndola Girls
3	DF	Martha Katila Banda	6 April 2004 (aged 20)	(Football Association of Zambia) Green Buffaloes
4	DF	Tabo Miselo	20 February 2002 (aged 22)	(Football Association of Zambia) ZANACO Ladies
5	DF	Pauline Zulu	3 October 2004 (aged 20)	(Football Association of Zambia) Elite Ladies
6	MF	Esther Mushota	12 July 1999 (aged 25)	(Football Association of Zambia) Indeni Roses
7	MF	Mary Mambwe	27 October 2002 (aged 21)	(Football Association of Zambia) Red Arrows
8	DF	Margaret Belemu (Captain)	24 February 1997 (aged 27)	(Football Association of Zambia) Red Arrows
9	FW	Lubandji Ochumba	1 July 2001 (aged 23)	(Football Association of Zambia) Red Arrows
10	MF	Regina Chanda	22 June 2002 (aged 22)	(Football Association of Zambia) ZANACO Ladies
11	MF	Fridah Mukoma	13 October 2006 (aged 18)	(Football Association of Zambia) ZESCO Ndola Girls
12	MF	Evarine Katongo	29 December 2002 (aged 21)	(Football Association of Zambia) Green Buffaloes
13	DF	Esther Muchinga	16 November 2000 (aged 23)	(Football Association of Zambia) ZANACO Ladies
14	MF	Bupe Banda	12 December 2006 (aged 17)	(Football Association of Zambia) Red Arrows
15	FW	Natasha Nanyangwe	27 June 1999 (aged 25)	(Football Association of Zambia) Green Buffaloes
16	GK	Annie Namonje	26 April 2000 (aged 24)	(Football Association of Zambia) ZESCO Ndola Girls
17	MF	Majory Mulenga	17 August 2003 (aged 21)	(Football Association of Zambia) ZESCO Ndola Girls
18	GK	Ngambo Musole	26 June 1998 (aged 26)	(Football Association of Zambia) Green Buffaloes
19	DF	Jackline Chomba	6 April 1996 (aged 28)	(Football Association of Zambia) ZISD
20	FW	Charity Mubanga	5 June 2000 (aged 24)	(Football Association of Zambia) ZESCO Ndola Girls
21	MF	Ruth Mukisi	18 September 1992 (aged 32)	(Football Association of Zambia) ZANACO Ladies
22	DF	Diana Banda	5 September 2002 (aged 22)	(Football Association of Zambia) Green Buffaloes
23	FW	Lungowe Namasiku	6 December 2002 (aged 21)	(Football Association of Zambia) ZISD

=== Angola ===
Head coach: Sousa Garcia

No.	Pos.	Player	Date of birth (age)	Club
1	GK	Maria Muecália	3 August 2006 (aged 18)	(Angolan Football Federation) Petro de Luanda
2	MF	Rufina Pedro	8 September 2004 (aged 20)	(Angolan Football Federation) Petro de Luanda
3	DF	Manuela Simão	4 April 2002 (aged 22)	(Angolan Football Federation) CD Terra Nova
4	DF	Catia Alves	5 May 2005 (aged 19)	(Angolan Football Federation) 1º de Agosto
5	MF	Simba Ngoy	7 April 1993 (aged 31)	(Angolan Football Federation) Petro de Luanda
6	DF	Helena Ecundi	23 March 2005 (aged 19)	(Angolan Football Federation) João de Almeida
7	FW	Cristina Makua	14 May 1995 (aged 29)	(Angolan Football Federation) 1º de Agosto
8	MF	Teresa Evaristo	24 April 1999 (aged 25)	(Angolan Football Federation) Sporting De Catabola
9	FW	Ruth Lopes	29 March 2006 (aged 18)	(Angolan Football Federation) 1º de Agosto
10	MF	Zeferina Caupe	11 July 1999 (aged 25)	(Angolan Football Federation) 1º de Agosto
11	MF	Maria Ponda	3 April 2004 (aged 20)	(Angolan Football Federation) 1º de Agosto
12	GK	Rita José	20 March 1998 (aged 26)	(Angolan Football Federation) 4 de Junho
13	FW	Ivone Nhanga	2 April 2002 (aged 22)	(Angolan Football Federation) Malanje Sport Clube
14	MF	Nety Bah	2 June 2000 (aged 24)	(Angolan Football Federation) Petro de Luanda
15	DF	Helena Malungo	8 October 2005 (aged 19)	(Angolan Football Federation) Petro de Luanda
16	FW	Maria Viera	17 August 2007 (aged 17)	(Angolan Football Federation) Carmona SC
17	FW	Arminda Lopes	10 February 1999 (aged 25)	(Angolan Football Federation) 4 de Junho
18	DF	Margarete Salvador (Captain)	16 August 2002 (aged 22)	(Angolan Football Federation) 1º de Agosto
19	MF	Ana Costa	30 October 2001 (aged 22)	(Angolan Football Federation) 1º de Agosto
20	MF	Domingas Luís	5 May 2005 (aged 19)	(Angolan Football Federation) Petro de Luanda
21	MF	Paulina Sambo	4 December 1996 (aged 27)	(Angolan Football Federation) Nacional de Benguela

=== Comoros ===
The final 23-player squad was announced on 15 October 2024. On 22 October 2024, Soiyifati Ali withdrew from the squad and was replaced by Inès Mohamed.

Head coach: Anissa Maoulida

No.	Pos.	Player	Date of birth (age)	Club
1	GK	Aïcha Saïd	25 October 2005 (aged 18)	(French Football Federation) Albi Marssac
2	DF	Alicia Chanfi	28 November 2002 (aged 21)	(French Football Federation) Saint-Maur
3	MF	Yousra Ahamadi	5 October 2003 (aged 21)	(French Football Federation) Olympique de Marseille
4	DF	Dioré Mariame Saïd	23 May 2003 (aged 21)	(French Football Federation) ES Paris 16
5	DF	Nourouzamane Ahmed	16 March 2004 (aged 20)	(Comoros Football Federation) FC Mwalimdjini
6	MF	Fatima Saïd Madjiri	13 January 1999 (aged 25)	(French Football Federation) ES Paris 16
8	FW	Anllaouia Hadhirami Ali	9 March 2003 (aged 21)	(Comoros Football Federation) Olympic de Moroni
9	FW	Haloua Ahamada	24 January 1995 (aged 29)	(French Football Federation) CPB Bréquigny
10	FW	Faïza Houmadi	30 September 2000 (aged 24)	Free agent
11	FW	Esteline Anduma	18 September 2004 (aged 20)	(French Football Federation) FC Talence
12	DF	Natacha Kamal Hamada	10 January 2002 (aged 22)	(Comoros Football Federation) Olympic de Moroni
13	FW	Saminat Abdou Mgomri	8 June 2005 (aged 19)	(French Football Federation) Olympique de Marseille
14	MF	Nourdati Mohamed Boinali	2 October 1999 (aged 25)	(Comoros Football Federation) Ouvanga Espoir de Moya
15	FW	Nasrati Saïd Ali	12 August 2006 (aged 18)	(Comoros Football Federation) Olympic de Moroni
16	GK	Matina Mohamed	28 April 1995 (aged 29)	(French Football Federation) Jumelles de Mzouazia
17	MF	Zaharouna Haoudadji	3 June 2000 (aged 24)	(French Football Federation) Quevilly-Rouen
18	MF	Youmna Zaki	24 February 2002 (aged 22)	Free agent
19	DF	Nasrin Hadharay	18 August 2003 (aged 21)	(French Football Federation) SDEFA
20	DF	Dalila Damdji Adinane	20 November 1997 (aged 26)	(Comoros Football Federation) FC Mwalimdjini
21	DF	Dalila Mohamed	2 July 2005 (aged 19)	(Comoros Football Federation) FC Mwalimdjini
22	DF	Aliya Saïd	14 February 1998 (aged 26)	(French Football Federation) Chassieu-Décines
23	GK	Amina Ben Ali Abdou	26 April 2005 (aged 19)	(Comoros Football Federation) Volcan Club de Moroni
	MF	Inès Mohamed	14 February 2002 (aged 22)	(French Football Federation) Saint-Denis

== Group D ==
=== Mozambique ===
The final 23-player squad was announced on 23 October 2024.

Head coach: Victor Matine

No.	Pos.	Player	Date of birth (age)	Club
1	GK	Neima Nhamire	25 January 2002 (aged 22)	(Mozambican Football Federation) Costa do Sol
2	DF	Isaura Chidembo	28 February 1999 (aged 25)	(Mozambican Football Federation) Associação Black Bulls
3	DF	Virginia Fernando	9 November 1999 (aged 24)	(Mozambican Football Federation) UD Songo
4	DF	Rosa Mainque	29 April 1999 (aged 25)	(Mozambican Football Federation) Costa do Sol
5	DF	Aurora Ngale	27 January 1992 (aged 32)	(Mozambican Football Federation) Águias Especiais Maputo
6	DF	Delicia Assane	28 March 1994 (aged 30)	(Mozambican Football Federation) UD Lichinga
7	FW	Lonica Tsanwane	15 April 1996 (aged 28)	(Football Federation of Belarus) FC Minsk
8	MF	Albertina Pondja	16 May 1993 (aged 31)	(Mozambican Football Federation) Costa do Sol
9	MF	Ines Chingueleze	24 February 1990 (aged 34)	(Mozambican Football Federation) Costa do Sol
10	FW	Celia Miguel	24 May 1999 (aged 25)	(Mozambican Football Federation) UD Lichinga
11	FW	Cidalia Cuta	27 October 1998 (aged 25)	(Football Federation of Belarus) FC Minsk
12	GK	Eva Costa	19 January 1992 (aged 32)	(Mozambican Football Federation) Costa do Sol
13	DF	Ivone Machaieie	28 January 2002 (aged 22)	(Mozambican Football Federation) Associação Black Bulls
14	FW	Angila Mutula	30 December 2004 (aged 19)	(Mozambican Football Federation) Costa do Sol
15	FW	Cina Manuel	1 September 2001 (aged 23)	(Mozambican Football Federation) UD Lichinga
16	DF	Emilia Cazembe	18 December 1998 (aged 25)	(Mozambican Football Federation) Costa do Sol
17	DF	Amelia Banze (Captain)	25 May 1988 (aged 36)	(Mozambican Football Federation) Matchedje de Maputo
18	FW	Ermelinda Guinda	5 March 1995 (aged 29)	(Mozambican Football Federation) Matchedje de Chimoio
19	DF	Eunencia Machava	24 March 2003 (aged 21)	(Mozambican Football Federation) Costa do Sol
20	MF	Joana Mossueie	28 March 2006 (aged 18)	(Mozambican Football Federation) Costa do Sol
21	DF	Teresa Duarte	1 January 2001 (aged 23)	(Mozambican Football Federation) Cocorico da Beira
22	GK	Anselmina Mussa	7 March 2001 (aged 23)	(Mozambican Football Federation) UD Lichinga
23	MF	Isabel Farauane	25 January 2002 (aged 22)	(Mozambican Football Federation) Brera Tchumene

=== Zimbabwe ===
An initial 30-player preliminary squad was named on 11 October 2024. The final 23-player squad was announced on 19 October 2024.

Head coach: Sithethelelwe Sibanda

No.	Pos.	Player	Date of birth (age)	Club
1	GK	Precious Mudyiwa	2 February 1998 (aged 26)	(Zimbabwe Football Association) Black Rhinos Queens
2	DF	Purity Mugayi	15 December 1998 (aged 25)	(Zimbabwe Football Association) Black Rhinos Queens
3	MF	Edline Mutumbami	13 October 1996 (aged 28)	(Zimbabwe Football Association) Chapungu Queens
4	DF	Egness Tumbare	31 July 1993 (aged 31)	(Zimbabwe Football Association) Herentals Queens
5	DF	Shiela Antonio	27 August 1999 (aged 25)	(Zimbabwe Football Association) Chapungu Queens
6	FW	Mitchell John	14 September 2005 (aged 19)	(Zimbabwe Football Association) Harare City Queens
7	MF	Tanyaradzwa Chihoro	1 December 2004 (aged 19)	(Zimbabwe Football Association) Maningi Soccer Academy
8	MF	Morelife Nyagumbo	9 February 2005 (aged 19)	(Zimbabwe Football Association) Faith Drive Academy
9	DF	Nobukhosi Ncube	17 February 1993 (aged 31)	(Zimbabwe Football Association) Chapungu Queens
10	MF	Ennety Chemhere	19 October 2002 (aged 22)	(Zimbabwe Football Association) Platinum Royals
11	MF	Daisy Kaitano	4 July 1995 (aged 29)	(Zimbabwe Football Association) Black Rhinos Queens
12	MF	Nadia Semba	18 March 2006 (aged 18)	(Zimbabwe Football Association) Correctional Queens
13	FW	Christabel Katona	13 February 1999 (aged 25)	(Zimbabwe Football Association) Black Rhinos Queens
14	FW	Ethel Chinyerere	12 June 1996 (aged 28)	(Zimbabwe Football Association) Chapungu Queens
15	MF	Peacemore Kenende	3 March 1997 (aged 27)	(South African Football Association) Richmond United
16	GK	Vanessa Lunga	16 June 1994 (aged 30)	(Zimbabwe Football Association) Chapungu Queens
17	FW	Privilege Mupeti	29 September 1997 (aged 27)	(Zimbabwe Football Association) Black Rhinos Queens
18	FW	Maudy Mafuruse	24 April 1999 (aged 25)	(Zimbabwe Football Association) Herentals Queens
19	MF	Shyline Dambamuromo	4 April 2000 (aged 24)	(Zimbabwe Football Association) Herentals Queens
20	MF	Natasha Ndowa	3 January 1998 (aged 26)	(Zimbabwe Football Association) Chapungu Queens
21	DF	Alice Moyo	26 March 1993 (aged 31)	(Zimbabwe Football Association) Herentals Queens
22	GK	Cynthia Shonga	18 June 2000 (aged 24)	(South African Football Association) Richmond United
23	MF	Patience Ndlovu	10 February 2006 (aged 18)	(Zimbabwe Football Association) Highlanders Royals

=== Lesotho ===
The final 23-player squad was announced on 17 October 2024.

Head coach: Shalane Lehohla

No.	Pos.	Player	Date of birth (age)	Club
1	GK	Thuto Maifo	25 May 1995 (aged 29)	(Lesotho Football Association) Lijabatho FC
2	DF	Mosili Motšoeneng	15 August 1996 (aged 28)	(South African Football Association) Royal AM
3	MF	Tšoanelo Leboka	21 July 1996 (aged 28)	(Lesotho Football Association) LDF Ladies
4	DF	Makhotso Moalosi	4 July 2003 (aged 21)	(Lesotho Football Association) Berea Ladies
5	DF	Thato Mapepesa (Captain)	24 January 2003 (aged 21)	(Lesotho Football Association) LDF Ladies
6	MF	Mats'eliso Ntšasa	17 March 1994 (aged 30)	(Lesotho Football Association) Lijabatho FC
7	MF	Moleboheng Moloi	23 July 2000 (aged 24)	(Lesotho Football Association) LMPS Ladies
8	FW	Litšeoane Maloro	13 May 1996 (aged 28)	(South African Football Association) Royal AM
9	DF	Lerato Mphou	30 October 1999 (aged 24)	(Lesotho Football Association) LDF Ladies
10	FW	Reitumetse Namane	22 August 2002 (aged 22)	(Lesotho Football Association) Kick4Life
11	DF	Nteboheleng Ramatsoku	22 May 2001 (aged 23)	(Lesotho Football Association) Lijabatho FC
12	MF	Lerato Tsoinyane	10 February 2004 (aged 20)	(Lesotho Football Association) Kick4Life
13	DF	Tebello Lekote	1 March 1994 (aged 30)	(Lesotho Football Association) Lijabatho FC
14	DF	Moseme Khashane	5 March 1999 (aged 25)	(Lesotho Football Association) Lijabatho FC
15	FW	Phuzile Molefe	18 January 1997 (aged 27)	(Lesotho Football Association) LDF Ladies
16	GK	'Mamakhabane Makibinyane	27 October 2002 (aged 21)	(Lesotho Football Association)
17	MF	Nthabeleng Potsane	29 October 1998 (aged 25)	(Lesotho Football Association) LDF Ladies
18	MF	Maseriti Mohlolo	22 April 1997 (aged 27)	(Lesotho Football Association) LDF Ladies
19	DF	Bokang Ntsane	20 July 2002 (aged 22)	(Lesotho Football Association) LDF Ladies
20	MF	Nthabeleng Makhabane	17 May 2003 (aged 21)	(Lesotho Football Association) LDF Ladies
21	DF	Itumeleng 'Molotsi	24 November 2001 (aged 22)	(Lesotho Football Association) Berea Ladies
22	GK	Reitumetsi Tuoane	1 December 2004 (aged 19)	(Lesotho Football Association) Kick4Life
23	DF	Ntsatsi Khakanyo	26 July 1992 (aged 32)	(Lesotho Football Association) LDF Ladies
–	DF	Ntaoleng Theletsi	10 January 2000 (aged 24)	(Lesotho Football Association)
–	MF	Boitumelo Rabale	5 August 1996 (aged 28)	(South African Football Association) Mamelodi Sundowns
