= Zambia women's national football team results =

Association football statistics

The Zambia women's national football team represents Zambia in women's association football. The following is a list of match results since 2020.

== 2020 ==
4 November COSAFA Women's Championship	Zambia	8–0	Lesotho	Ibhayi, South Africa
12:30	Banda 30', 52', 70'; Chilufya 57'; May. Mulenga 65'; Chanda 66', 76'; Lungu 84'	Report (COSAFA); Report (SW)		Stadium: Wolfson Stadium

9 November COSAFA Women's Championship	Zambia	0–1	Malawi	Ibhayi, South Africa
12:30		Report (COSAFA); Report (SW)	Te. Chawinga 31'	Stadium: Wolfson Stadium

12 November COSAFA Women's Championship	Botswana	2–1	Zambia	Ibhayi, South Africa
12:00	Gaofetoge 8'; Tholekele 39' (pen.)	Report (COSAFA); Report (SW)	Lungu 45+5'	Stadium: Wolfson Stadium

28 November Friendly	Chile	1–2	Zambia	Santiago, Chile
--:-- UTC−4	Araya 48'	Report (Goal)	Banda 50'; Nachula 60'	Stadium: Estadio San Carlos de Apoquindo; Referee: María Carvajal (Chile)

1 December Friendly	Chile	Cancelled	Zambia	Santiago, Chile
--:-- UTC−4		Report (Goal)

=== 2021 ===
1 July Friendly	Great Britain	Cancelled	Zambia	Stoke-on-Trent, England
				Stadium: Bet365 Stadium

21 July 2020 Summer Olympics GS Group F	Zambia	3–10	Netherlands	Rifu, Japan
20:00 UTC+9	Banda 19', 82', 83'	Report (Tokyo 2020); Report (FIFA); Report (SW)	Miedema 9', 15', 29', 59'; Martens 14', 38'; Van de Sanden 44'; Roord 64'; Beerensteyn 75'; Pelova 80'	Stadium: Miyagi Stadium; Attendance: 0 Referee: Laura Fortunato (Argentina)

24 July 2020 Summer Olympics GS Group F	China	4–4	Zambia	Rifu, Japan
17:00 UTC+9	Wang Shuang 6', 22', 23', 84' (pen.)	Report (Tokyo 2020); Report (FIFA); Report (SW)	Kundananji 15'; Banda 43' (pen.), 46', 69'	Stadium: Miyagi Stadium; Referee: Melissa Borjas (Honduras)

27 July 2020 Summer Olympics GS Group F	Brazil	1–0	Zambia	Saitama, Japan
20:30 UTC+9	Andressa 19'	Report (TOCOG); Report (FIFA)		Stadium: Saitama Stadium 2002; Referee: Yoshimi Yamashita (Japan)

29 September COSAFA Women's Championship GS Group C	Zambia	5–0	Eswatini	Port Elizabeth, South Africa
	Ochumba 24', 75', 77'; Belemu 58'; Mukwasa 81'	Report		Stadium: Wolfson Stadium

3 October COSAFA Women's Championship GS Group C	Zambia	3–0	Namibia	Port Elizabeth, South Africa
				Stadium: Gelvandale Stadium

5 October COSAFA Women's Championship GS Group C	Zambia	1–0	Uganda	Port Elizabeth, South Africa
				Stadium: Wolfson Stadium

7 October COSAFA Women's Championship Semi-finals	Tanzania	1–1 (3–2 p)	Zambia	Port Elizabeth, South Africa
				Stadium: Wolfson Stadium

9 October COSAFA Women's Championship 3rd Place	Zambia	1–1 (4–3 p)	South Africa	Port Elizabeth, South Africa
				Stadium: Wolfson Stadium

20 October 2022 AFWCON qualification First round 1st leg	Malawi	1–1	Zambia	Lilongwe, Malawi
<!- – 20:00 CEST (UTC+2) -->	Thom 66'	Report	Chanda 20'	Stadium: Bingu National Stadium; Referee: Itumeleng Methikga (Botswana)

26 October 2022 AFWCON qualification First round 2nd leg	Zambia	3–2 (4–3 agg.)	Malawi	Lusaka, Zambia
	Kundananji 25', 41'; Mweemba 74'	Report	Simwaka 9'; Mvula 70'	Stadium: Nkoloma Stadium
Note: Zambia won 4–3 on aggregate.

=== 2022 ===
11 February Friendly	Zambia	3–0	South Africa	Lusaka, Zambia
	Banda 6', 38'; Chitundu 30'	Report		Stadium: Nkoloma Stadium

16 February 2022 AFWCON qualification Second round 1st leg	Zambia	0–0	Namibia	Lusaka, Zambia
		Report		Stadium: Nkoloma Stadium; Referee: Letticia Viana (Eswatini)

22 February 2022 AFWCON qualification Second round 2nd leg	Namibia	1–1 (1–1 (a) agg.)	Zambia	Johannesburg (South Africa)
	Naris 6'	Report	Mapepa 70'	Stadium: Dobsonville Stadium; Referee: Akhona Makalima (South Africa)
Note: 1–1 on aggregate. Zambia won on away goals.

29 April Friendly	Zambia	1–0	Botswana	Lusaka
	Ochumba Lubanji 84'	Report		Stadium: Nkoloma Stadium

2 May Friendly	Zambia	1–1	Botswana	Lusaka
	Mweemba 78'		Radiakanyo 27'	Stadium: Nkoloma Stadium

18 June International Friendly	Morocco	1–1	Zambia	Rabat, Morocco
21:00 GMT+1	Zulu 62' (.og)	Report	Chanda 77'	Stadium: Prince Moulay Abdellah Stadium

3 July 2022 2022 AFWCON GS	Cameroon	0–0	Zambia	Casablanca, Morocco
18:00				Stadium: Stade Mohammed V Referee: Aïssata Boudy Lam (Note: Head referee Aïssata Boudy Lam was replaced by 4th official Lidya Tafesse (Ethiopia) due to injury at the 64 minute.) (Mauritania)

6 July 2022 2022 AFWCON GS	Zambia	1–0	Tunisia	Casablanca, Morocco
16:00 UTC+0	Chitundu 90+2'			Stadium: Stade Mohammed V Referee: Maria Rivet (Mauritius)

9 July 2022 2022 AFWCON GS	Zambia	4–1	Togo	Rabat, Morocco
21:00	Chanda 15', 60'; Lungu 21'; Mapepa 41'		Woedikou 35'	Stadium: Stade Moulay Hassan; Referee: Shamira Nabadda (Uganda)

13 July 2022 2022 AFWCON QF	Zambia	1–1 (a.e.t.) (4–2 p)	Senegal	Casablanca, Morocco
18:00	Chitundu 70'	Report (FIFA)	N. Ndiaye 61'	Stadium: Stade Mohammed V Referee: Bouchra Karboubi (Morocco)
	Penalties
	Chanda (penalty scored); Zulu (penalty scored); Lungu (penalty scored); Mweemba (penalty missed); Nali (penalty scored)		(penalty missed) Fall; (penalty scored) Diop; (penalty scored) Baldé; (penalty missed) Diakhaté

18 July 2022 2022 AFWCON SF	Zambia	0–1	South Africa	Casablanca, Morocco
			Motlhalo 90+4' (pen.)	Stadium: Stade Mohammed V Referee: Lidya Tafesse (Ethiopia)

22 July 2022 2022 AFWCON Third place play-off	Nigeria	0–1	Zambia	Casablanca, Morocco
21:00				Stadium: Stade Mohammed V

1 September 2022 COSAFA Women's Championship Group B	Zambia	2–0	Namibia	Gqeberha, South Africa
15:30	Banda 4', 71'	Report		Stadium: Nelson Mandela Bay Stadium

4 September 2022 COSAFA Women's Championship Group B	Zambia	7–0	Lesotho	Port Elizabeth
15:30	Banda 11', 30', 48', 52', 56'; Katongo 45'; Mapepa 66'	Report		Stadium: Madibaz Stadium

6 September 2022 COSAFA Women's Championship Group B	Eswatini	0–2	Zambia	Wolfson Stadium, Gqeberha
12:00			Phiri 40'; Banda 83'

9 September 2022 COSAFA Women's Championship SF	Tanzania	1–2	Zambia	Wolfson Stadium, Gqeberha
12:00	Mweemba 28' (o.g.)		Banda 12'; Zulu 46'

11 September 2022 COSAFA Women's Championship Final	South Africa	0–1	Zambia	Nelson Mandela Bay Stadium, Gqeberha
15:00			Banda 108'

6 October Friendly	Netherlands	v	Zambia	Breda, Netherlands
				Stadium: Rat Verlegh Stadion

12 November Friendly	Colombia	1–0	Zambia	Santiago de Cali
	Ramírez 6'	Report		Stadium: Estadio Olímpico Pascual Guerrero

14 November Friendly	Colombia	1–0	Zambia	Santiago de Cali
	Ramírez 21' (pen.)	Report		Stadium: Estadio Olímpico Pascual Guerrero

=== 2023 ===
7 April Friendly	South Korea	5–2	Zambia	Suwon, South Korea
19:00 UTC+9	Cho So-hyun 24', 84'; Lee Geum-min 58', 62'; Park Eun-sun 90+1'	Report	Kundananji 38'; Banda 45+2'	Stadium: Suwon World Cup Stadium; Referee: Anna-Marie Keighley (New Zealand)

11 April Friendly	South Korea	5–0	Zambia	Yongin, South Korea
--:-- UTC+9	Lee Geum-min 33' (pen.), 53', 77' (pen.); Park Eun-sun 35', 89'	Report		Stadium: Yongin Mireu Stadium; Referee: Anna-Marie Keighley (New Zealand)

11 June Friendly	Zambia	1–0	Tanzania	Lusaka, Zambia
15:00	Selemani 68'			Stadium: Woodlands Stadium

22 June Friendly	Republic of Ireland	3–2	Zambia	Dublin, Ireland
	Barrett 49' (pen.), 72'; O'Riordan 63'	Report	Brosnan 17' (o.g.); Kundananji 79'	Stadium: Tallaght Stadium; Attendance: 5,732

30 June Friendly	Switzerland	3–3	Zambia	Biel, Switzerland
	Crnogorčević 8'; Piubel 54'; Sow 81'	Report	Chanda 13'; Banda 20'; Kundananji 45+7'	Stadium: Tissot Arena; Attendance: 2,542; Referee: Stacey Pearson (England)

7 July Friendly	Germany	2–3	Zambia	Fürth, Germany
	Schüller 90+1'; Popp 90+10'	Report	Banda 48', 90+11'; Kundananji 54'	Stadium: Sportpark Ronhof Thomas Sommer; Attendance: 11,404; Referee: Vivian Peeters (Netherlands)

22 July 2023 FIFA World Cup Group stage	Zambia	0–5	Japan	Hamilton, New Zealand
		Report	Miyazawa 43', 62'; Tanaka 55'; Endō 71'; Ueki 90+11' (pen.)	Stadium: Waikato Stadium; Attendance: 16,111; Referee: Tess Olofsson (Sweden)

26 July 2023 FIFA World Cup Group stage	Spain	5–0	Zambia	Auckland, New Zealand
19:30	Abelleira 9'; Hermoso 13', 70'; Redondo 69', 85'	Report		Stadium: Eden Park; Attendance: 20,983; Referee: Oh Hyeon-jeong (South Korea)

31 July 2023 FIFA World Cup Group stage	Costa Rica	1–3	Zambia	Hamilton, New Zealand
19:00 UTC+12	Herrera 47'	Report	Mweemba 3'; B. Banda 31' (pen.); Kundananji 90+3'	Stadium: Waikato Stadium; Attendance: 8,117; Referee: Bouchra Karboubi (Morocco)

22 September International Friendly	Morocco	0–2	Zambia	Casablanca, Morocco
19:00 UTC+1		Report	B. Banda 50' (pen.), 69'	Stadium: Père Jégo Stadium

26 September International Friendly	Morocco	2–6	Zambia	Rabat, Morocco
19:00 UTC+1	Ouzraoui 38'; Ayane 83'	Report	Kundananji 20', 40', 89'; B. Banda 43' (pen.), 56', 79'	Stadium: Moulay Hassan Stadium

5 October 2023 2023 COSAFA WC GS	Zambia	0–0	Mozambique	Pretoria, South Africa
15:30 UTC+2		Report		Stadium: Lucas Moripe Stadium; Referee: Eness Gumbo (Malawi)

8 October 2023 2023 COSAFA WC GS	Zambia	3–1	Angola	Johannesburg, South Africa
12:00 UTC+2	Jere 3', 85'; Nkole 20'	Report	Luvunga 90+1'	Stadium: Dobsonville Stadium; Referee: Nteboheleng Setoko (Lesotho)

10 October 2023 2023 COSAFA WC GS	Comoros	1–5	Zambia	Johannesburg, South Africa
12:00 UTC+2	Mohamed Ahamadi 42'	Report	Kabwe 20', 59', 75'; Mweemba 60'; Jere 87' (pen.)	Stadium: UJ Stadium; Referee: Rosa Hanjavola (Madagascar)

13 October 2023 COSAFA SF	Zambia	1–0	Zimbabwe	Pretoria, South Africa
12:00 UTC+2	Jere 50'	Report		Stadium: Lucas Moripe Stadium; Referee: Akhona Makalima (South Africa)

15 October 2023 COSAFA F	Zambia	1–2	Malawi	Pretoria, South Africa
15:30 UTC+2	A. Phiri 84'	Report	Simwaka 34'; Thom 90+1'	Stadium: Lucas Moripe Stadium; Referee: Antsino Twanyanyukwa (Namibia)

23–31 October 2024 Olympic qualifying	Zambia	Cancelled	Mali

23–31 October 2024 Olympic qualifying	Mali	Cancelled	Zambia	Bamako, Mali
Note: Zambia won on walkover after Mali withdrew.

29 November 2023 2024 AFWCON qualification Second round 2nd leg	Angola	0–6	Zambia	Luanda, Angola
16:00 UTC+1		Report (CAF)	Mweemba 40'; B. Banda 44' (pen.), 45+2', 64'; Lungu 52'; Kundananji 87'	Stadium: Estádio 22 de Junho

5 December 2023 2024 AFWCON qualification Second round 1st leg	Zambia	6–0 (12–0 agg.)	Angola	Lusaka, Zambia
--:-- UTC+0	B. Banda 14'; S. Banda 46'; Chitundu 71'; E. Banda 76'			Stadium: Nkoloma Stadium
Note: Zambia won 12–0 on aggregate.

=== 2024 ===
23 February 2024 2024 Olympic qualifying	Ghana	0–1	Zambia	Accra, Ghana
			Kundananji 18'	Stadium: Accra Sports Stadium

28 February 2024 2024 Olympic qualifying	Zambia	3–3 (4–3 agg.)	Ghana	Ndola, Zambia
	Banda 10', 90+6'; Assifuah 61' (o.g.)		Assifuah 22'; Boaduwaa 55'; Bugre 64'	Stadium: Levy Mwanawasa Stadium
Note: Zambia won 4–3 on aggregate.

5 April 2024 2024 Olympic qualifying	Zambia	1–2	Morocco	Ndola, Zambia
17:00 UTC+2	Mweemba 80'		Redouani 45'; Ayane 90+4'	Stadium: Levy Mwanawasa Stadium

9 April 2024 2024 Olympic qualifying	Morocco	0–2 (a.e.t.) (2–3 agg.)	Zambia	Rabat
20:00 UTC+0			B. Banda 39', 105+2' (pen.)	Stadium: Moulay Hassan Stadium; Referee: Salima Mukansanga (Rwanda)
Note: Zambia won 3–2 on aggregate.

13 July Friendly	New Zealand	1–1	Zambia	Vichy, France
	Kitching 67' (pen.)		Chileshe 49'	Stadium: Stade Louis Darragon

25 July 2024 Olympics GS	United States	3–0	Zambia	Nice, France
21:00 UTC+2	Rodman 17'; Swanson 24', 25'			Stadium: Stade de Nice; Attendance: 5,550; Referee: Ramon Abatti (Brazil)

28 July 2024 2024 Olympics GS	Australia	6–5	Zambia	Nice, France
19:00		Report		Stadium: Stade de Nice

31 July 2024 Olympics GS	Zambia	1–4	Germany	Saint-Étienne, France
19:00				Stadium: Stade Geoffroy-Guichard

24 October 2024 2024 COSAFA WC GS	Zambia	3–0	Angola	Ibhayi, South Africa
12:00 UTC+2	Ochumba 30'; Namasiku 47'; Chanda 72'	Report		Stadium: Isaac Wolfson Stadium; Referee: Grace Gimo (Zimbabwe)

29 October 2024 2024 COSAFA WC GS	Zambia	7–0	Comoros	Gqeberha, South Africa
12:00 UTC+2	Mukoma 6', 10', 75'; Lubanji 8', 61'; Chanda 45+3'; Mubanga 81'	Report		Stadium: Madibaz Stadium; Referee: Antsino Twanyanyukwa (Namibia)

31 October 2024 2024 COSAFA WC SF	Malawi	0–2	Zambia	Ibhayi, South Africa
12:00 UTC+2		Report	Lubandji 46'; Mukoma 68'	Stadium: Isaac Wolfson Stadium; Referee: Vistoria Nuusiku Shangula (Namibia)

2 November 2024 2024 COSAFA WC F	Zambia	0–0 (a.e.t.) (4–3 p)	South Africa	Ibhayi, South Africa
15:00 UTC+2		Report		Stadium: Isaac Wolfson Stadium; Referee: Antsino Twanyanyukwa (Namibia)
	Penalties
	Namasiku (penalty scored); Chomba (penalty scored); Musole (penalty scored); Mulenga (penalty scored)		(penalty scored) Ludwig; (penalty missed) Pila; (penalty scored) Mdelwa; (penalty scored) Hendricks; (penalty missed) Hadebe

=== 2025 ===
23 February Friendly	Zambia	2–0	Malawi	Lusaka, Zambia
11:00 UTC+2	Chitundu 20'; Kundananji 79'	Report		Stadium: REIZ Arena

25 February Friendly	Zambia	2–3	Malawi	Lusaka, Zambia
11:30 UTC+2	Kundananji 6'; Nachula 80'	Report	Kadzere 47'; Chinzimu 56'; Thom 61'	Stadium: REIZ Arena

5 April Yongchuan International Tournament	Zambia	2–3	Thailand	Chongqing, China
19:35 UTC+8	Nachula 45'; Lubandji 60'		Promthongmee 36'; Phomsri 69'; Peng-ngam 73' (pen.)	Stadium: Yongchuan Sports Center

8 April Yongchuan International Tournament	Zambia	4–3	Uzbekistan	Chongqing, China
--:-- UTC+8				Stadium: Yongchuan Sports Center

31 May 2025 Nations Challenge	Botswana	1–1	Zambia	Pretoria, South Africa
15:00 UTC+2	Ontlametse 80'	Report	B. Banda 63'	Stadium: Lucas Moripe Stadium

3 June Nations Challenge	South Africa	2–0	Zambia	Pretoria, South Africa
15:00 UTC+2	Gamade 74'; Seopesenwe 82'			Stadium: Lucas Moripe Stadium

5 July WAFCON 2024 GS	Morocco	2–2	Zambia	Rabat, Morocco
21:00	Jraïdi 12' (pen.); Chebbak 87'	Report	Banda 1'; Kundananji 27'	Stadium: Olympic Stadium; Referee: Shamirah Nabadda (Uganda)

9 July WAFCON 2024 GS	Zambia	3–2	Senegal	Mohammedia, Morocco
17:00	Banda 12', 73'; Kundananji 51'	Report	N. Ndiaye 5', 80' (pen.)	Stadium: El Bachir Stadium; Referee: Vincentia Amédomé (Togo)

12 July WAFCON 2024 GS	Zambia	1–0	DR Congo	Mohammedia, Morocco
20:00	Kundananji 9'	Report		Stadium: El Bachir Stadium; Referee: Josephine Wanjiku (Kenya)

18 July CAF WAFCON 2024 QF	Nigeria	5–0	Zambia	Casablanca, Morocco
18:00	Ohale 2'; Okoronkwo 33'; Ihezuo 45'; Demehin 68'; Ijamilusi 90+1'	Report		Stadium: Larbi Zaouli Stadium; Referee: Bouchra Karboubi (Morocco)

22 October 2025 2026 WAFCON qualifying	Namibia	2–4	Zambia	Johannesburg (South Africa)
15:00 UTC+2	Kooper 52'; Coleman 59' (pen.)	Report (FIFA)	Kundananji 13', 71', 90+4'; Nachula 17'	Stadium: Dobsonville Stadium; Referee: Tatu Malogo (Tanzania)

26 October 2025 2026 WAFCON qualifying	Zambia	3–0	Namibia	Ndola
15:00 UTC+2	Kundananji 21'; E. Phiri 33'; Chuilufya 47'	Report (FIFA)		Stadium: Levy Mwanawasa Stadium; Referee: Dorsaf Ganouati (Tunisia)
Note: Zambia won 7–2 on aggregate.

30 November 2025 3 Nations Tournament	Malawi	1-1	Zambia	Lilongwe, Malawi
15:00	Kabzere 56'		Nanyangwe 65'	Stadium: Bingu National Stadium

2 December 2025 3 Nations Tournament	Zambia	3-1	Zimbabwe	Lilongwe, Malawi
15:00	Phiri 11', 12'; Nanyangwe 43'		Ncube 31'	Stadium: Bingu National Stadium

== See also ==
- Zambia national football team results (2020–present)
