= Seychelles women's national football team results =

This article lists the results and fixtures for the Seychelles women's national football team.

== Record per opponent ==
Key

Positive balance (more wins than losses)
Neutral balance (as many wins as losses)
Negative balance (more losses than wins)

The following table shows Seychelles' all-time official international record per opponent:

Opponent	Pld	W	D	L	GF	GA	GD	W%	Confederation
Eswatini	1	0	0	1	0	6	−6	0	CAF
Madagascar	1	0	0	1	2	8	−6	0	CAF
Malawi	2	0	0	2	0	34	-34	0	CAF
Maldives	3	2	0	1	8	2	+6	66.67	AFC
Mali	1	0	0	1	0	9	−9	0	CAF
Mauritius	2	0	1	1	2	4	−2	0	CAF
Mayotte	2	0	0	2	2	4	−2	0	CAF
Mozambique	1	0	0	1	3	7	−4	0	CAF
Namibia	1	0	0	1	0	7	−7	0	CAF
Papua New Guinea	1	0	0	1	0	9	−9	0	OFC
Rodrigues	1	1	0	0	5	0	+5	100	—
Saudi Arabia	1	0	0	1	0	2	−2	0	AFC
Singapore	3	0	0	3	2	22	−20	0	AFC
South Africa	1	0	0	1	1	8	−7	0	CAF
South Sudan	1	0	0	1	1	5	−4	0	CAF
Swaziland	1	0	0	1	1	6	−5	0	CAF
United Arab Emirates	2	0	0	2	1	8	−7	0	AFC
Total	16	3	0	13	24	68	−44	18.75	—

Last updated: Singapore vs Seychelles, 28 November 2025.

== Results ==
=== 2015 ===
5 July 2015 Friendly	Mozambique	7–3	Seychelles	White River, South Africa

8 July 2015 Friendly	Swaziland	6–1	Seychelles	Nelspruit, South Africa

2 August 2015 2015 Indian Ocean Island GS	Seychelles	4–1	Maldives	Saint-André, Réunion
	Bibi 15', 46', 70'; César 87'		Areesha 27'	Stadium: Stade Baby-Larivière

4 August 2015 2015 Indian Ocean Island GS	Mayotte	2–1	Seychelles	Saint-Pierre, Réunion
				Stadium: Stade Michel Volnay

6 August 2015 2015 Indian Ocean Island SF	Madagascar	8–2	Seychelles	Saint-Benoît, Réunion
	Farafanirina 12' (pen.), 32', 37'; Ravaosoloarimalala 15', 57'; Tshohy 20', 28'; Ramiseheno 78'		Bibi 1' (pen.), 60' (pen.)	Stadium: Stade Jean-Allane

7 August 2015 2015 Indian Ocean Island 3rd	Mayotte	2–1	Seychelles	Le Port, Réunion
	Hamouza; Abdillah			Stadium: Stade Lambrakis

=== 2021 ===
15 September 2021 Friendly	United Arab Emirates	4–1	Seychelles	Dubai, United Arab Emirates
	Al Muntaser 33'; Al Mheiri 37'; Jassem 80'; Khaled 90'	Report	Bibi 64'	Stadium: Theyab Awana Stadium

18 September 2021 Friendly	United Arab Emirates	4–0	Seychelles	Dubai, United Arab Emirates
	Al Hammadi 14'; Al Adwan 52'; Nouabi 56'; Wael 88' (pen.)	Report		Stadium: Theyab Awana Stadium

=== 2022 ===
15 February 2022 Friendly	Maldives	1–0	Seychelles	Malé, Maldives
--:-- UTC+5	Noora 10'	Report		Stadium: National Football Stadium; Attendance: 150; Referee: Adam Fazeel (Maldives)

18 February 2022 Friendly	Maldives	0–4	Seychelles	Malé, Maldives
--:-- UTC+5		Report	Esther 12'; Bibi 71', 88'; Moustache 74'	Stadium: National Football Stadium; Attendance: 244; Referee: Sinan Hussain (Maldives)

20 February 2022 Friendly	Saudi Arabia	2–0	Seychelles	Malé, Maldives
17:00 UTC+5	Mobarak 15'; Al-Tamimi 49' (pen.)	Report		Stadium: National Football Stadium; Referee: Adam Fazeel (Maldives)

4 April 2022 2022 FAS Tri-Nations Series	Singapore	6–2	Seychelles	Kallang, Singapore
20:30 UTC+8	Gigette 18', 25'; Tan 52', 90+4' (pen.); Chu 72'; Nurerwadah 90+2'	Report	Bibi 30', 71'	Stadium: Jalan Besar Stadium; Attendance: 1,498; Referee: Nathan Chan (Singapore)

8 April 2022 2022 FAS Tri-Nations Series	Seychelles	0–9	Papua New Guinea	Kallang, Singapore
20:30 UTC+8		Report	Cadeau 25' (o.g.); Kaipu 28', 52'; Gabong 45'; Gunemba 55'; Zale 69'; Padio 71', 81' (pen.); Emhabe 85'	Stadium: Jalan Besar Stadium

5 July 2022 2022 Mauritius Triangular	Seychelles	5–0	Rodrigues	Quatre Bornes, Mauritius
18:00 UTC+4	Bibi 4', 5', 45'; Esther 13'; Cesar 53'	Report		Stadium: Mauritius Football Association Stadium

9 July 2022 2022 Mauritius Triangular	Mauritius	1–1	Seychelles	Quatre Bornes, Mauritius
17:00 UTC+4	Ramasawmy 30'		Esther 43'	Stadium: Cote d'Or National Sports Complex

=== 2023 ===
7 July 2023 Friendly	Ethiopia	v	Seychelles	Addis Ababa, Ethiopia
				Stadium: Abebe Bikila Stadium
Note: Cancelled.

25 September 2023 Friendly	Malawi	17–0	Seychelles	Blantyre, Malawi
15:00 UTC+2	Khumalo 9'; Kabzere 16'; Thom 18', 26'; Chikupira 31', 36', 43'; Mlimbika 40'; Mathyola 53'; Chinyamula 55', 84'; Gondwe 60', 81', 87'; Te. Chawinga 62', 76', 78'	Report		Stadium: Mpira Stadium

28 September 2023 Friendly	Malawi	17–0	Seychelles	Blantyre, Malawi
15:00 UTC+2	Simwaka 6', 41'; Chavinda 7', 21', 44', 50', 79'; Kandodo 9'; Madise 19'; Nyirongo 25'; Sani 28'; Mathyola 53'; Mlimbika 58', 61', 72'; Yosefe 79'; Nyenga 90+2'	Report		Stadium: Mpira Stadium; Referee: Rose Zimba (Malawi)

5 December 2023 International Friendly	Mauritius	3–1	Seychelles	Saint Pierre, Mauritius
19:00 UTC+4	Ramasawmy 21'; Pierrot 56'; Lam kam cheung 64'	Report (MFA)	P. Moustache 46'	Stadium: Côte d'Or National Sports Complex

8 December 2023 International Friendly	Mauritius	1–1	Seychelles	Saint Pierre, Mauritius
19:00 UTC+4	Fourneau 17'	Report (MFA)	P. Moustache 89'	Stadium: Côte d'Or National Sports Complex

=== 2024 ===
29 May 2024 Friendly	Mali	9–0	Seychelles	Dar es Salaam, Tanzania
13:00 UTC+0	Traoré S. 9', 32' (pen.), 51'; Konté K. 17'; Baradji H. 55' (pen.); Diarra A. 60', 83'; Diarra N. 86'; Traore A. 89'	Report		Stadium: Azam Complex Stadium

31 May 2024 Friendly	Seychelles	1–5	South Sudan	Dar es Salaam, Tanzania
16:00 UTC+3	Esther 35'	Report	Malili 44', 67'; Bol Kuach 75'; Stephen 82'; Nyoka 85'	Stadium: Azam Complex Stadium

22 October 2024 2024 COSAFA WC GS	Eswatini	6–0	Seychelles	Gqeberha, South Africa
14:00 UTC+2	Nkambule 4', 53'; Ngcamphalala 45+3', 62', 66'; Ndlovu 70'	Report		Stadium: Nelson Mandela Bay Stadium; Referee: Akhona Makalima (South Africa)

25 October 2024 2024 COSAFA WC GS	Namibia	7–0	Seychelles	Ibhayi, South Africa
12:00 UTC+2	Amukoto 6'; Vliete 29', 30', 51'; Kooper 62', 90'; Coleman 76' (pen.)	Report		Stadium: Isaac Wolfson Stadium; Referee: Eness Gumbo (Malawi)

28 October 2024 2024 COSAFA WC GS	South Africa	8–1	Seychelles	Gqeberha, South Africa
15:00 UTC+2	Hendricks 11', 26', 51'; Phahla 24'; Motlogelwa 44'; Mkhwanazi 45+6', 56'; Moosa 52'	Report	Pas. Moustache 74' (pen.)	Stadium: Madibaz Stadium; Referee: Grace Gimo (Zimbabwe)

=== 2025 ===
25 November 2025 Friendly match	Singapore	9–0	Seychelles	Bukit Gombak, Singapore
15:30 UTC+4	F. Ruhaizat; S. Zu’risqha; R. Azman; S. Rosielin; (o.g.)	Report		Stadium: Bukit Gombak Stadium; Attendance: 0 (Behind closed doors)

28 November 2025 Friendly match	Singapore	7–0	Seychelles	Bukit Gombak, Singapore
15:30 UTC+4	L.X. Lim 13'; F. Ruhaizat 16'; S. Zu’risqha 36', 40'; D. Tan 51', 71'; S. Nurinsyirah 65'	Report		Stadium: Bukit Gombak Stadium

=== 2026 ===
October 2026 2028 CAF Women's Olympic Q	Seychelles	v	Kenya
--:-- UTC+4

October 2026 2028 CAF Women's Olympic Q	Kenya	v	Seychelles
--:-- UTC+4

== See also ==
- Seychelles national football team results
