= 2024 COSAFA Women's Championship =

Association football championship

Hollywoodbets COSAFA Women's Championship 2024

Tournament details
- Host country: South Africa
- City: Gqeberha
- Dates: 22 October – 2 November
- Teams: 14 (from 1 sub-confederation)
- Venues: 3 (in 1 host city)

Final positions
- Champions: Zambia (2nd title)
- Runners-up: South Africa

Tournament statistics
- Matches played: 21
- Goals scored: 75 (3.57 per match)
- Top scorer(s): (Zambia) Ochumba Lubandji (Zambia) Fridah Mukoma (4 goals each)
- Best player: (South Africa) Isabella Ludwig
- Best goalkeeper: (South Africa) Jessica Williams
- Fair play award: Zambia

The 2024 COSAFA Women's Championship, also known as the 2024 Hollywoodbets COSAFA Women's Championship, was the twelfth edition of the COSAFA Women's Championship. It was for sponsorship purposes, and the annual international women's association football championship was contested by the women's national teams of Southern Africa and was organized by COSAFA. The tournament took place in Gqeberha, South Africa from 22 October to 2 November 2024. The opening match was won by Eswatini for the second consecutive year, defeating debutant Seychelles 6–0 at the Nelson Mandela Bay Stadium in Gqeberha, achieving their biggest win to date.

Malawi were the defending champions, having claimed their first title in the previous edition. However, their attempt to defend the title fell short in the semi-finals when they were eliminated by the eventual champions Zambia, who went on to clinch their second title after defeating host South Africa in the final 4–3 on penalties following a scoreless draw. Zambian players Ochumba Lubandji and Fridah Mukoma co-jointly won the Golden Boot scoring four goals each throughout the tournament. South Africa's Isabella Ludwig was voted the tournament's best player, winning the Golden Ball, whilst Ludwig's teammate Jessica Williams won the Golden Glove, awarded to the best-performing goalkeeper of the tournament.

Of the fourteen participating teams, Seychelles made their tournament debut, with them and Mauritius scoring their first-ever goals in the competition against South Africa and Madagascar, respectively. Comoros achieved their first win in the tournament after defeating Angola in the group stage.

== Format ==
The competition format was unveiled at the official draw ceremony held in October 2024. The tournament began with a group stage featuring four groups (two groups of four teams and two groups of three teams). The top team from each group progressed to the semifinals. The winners of the semifinals advanced to the final, while, for the first time since 2020, no third-place match was held.

== Teams ==
=== Participation ===
A record 14 COSAFA Member Associations have entered this year's edition, marking the first time all members were participating. Of the 14 teams competing, 12 featured in last year's 2023 edition. Mauritius returned to the tournament after missing the previous edition, while Seychelles made their debut in the competition.

Note: All appearance statistics exclude the 2008 edition.

Team	App	Last appearance	Previous best performance	FIFA ranking August 2024
Angola	7th	2023	Group stage (2006, 2019, 2020, 2021, 2022, 2023)	148
Botswana	10th	2023	Runners-up (2020)	153
Comoros	5th	2023	Group stage (2019, 2020, 2022, 2023)	188
Eswatini	10th	2023	Group stage (2002, 2006, 2017, 2018, 2019, 2020, 2021, 2022, 2023)	182
Lesotho	9th	2023	Group stage (2002, 2006, 2011, 2017, 2018, 2020, 2022, 2023)	176
Madagascar	5th	2023	Group stage (2017, 2018, 2019, 2023)	190
Malawi	11th	2023	Champions (2023)	156
Mauritius	4th	2022	Group stage (2017, 2019, 2022)	194
Mozambique	10th	2023	Third place (2023)	171
Namibia	8th	2023	Runners-up (2006)	125
Seychelles	1st	—N/a	Debut	170
South Africa	11th	2023	Champions (2002, 2006, 2017, 2018, 2019, 2020)	50
Zambia	11th	2023	Champions (2022)	62
Zimbabwe	10th	2023	Champions (2011)	124

=== Draw ===
The final group stage draw took place at COSAFA House in Johannesburg, South Africa, on 8 October 2024 at 12:00 SAST (UTC+2).

For this edition, the top three teams from the previous tournament, along with the host nation, were automatically placed into the following positions. South Africa, the host nation, to position A1; Malawi, the 2023 champions, were assigned to position B1; Zambia, the 2023 runners-up, to position C1; and Mozambique, the 2023 third-place team, to position D1. The remaining teams were seeded into three pots for the draw: Pot 1 included Zimbabwe, Botswana, Namibia, and Angola; Pot 2 featured Eswatini, Madagascar, Comoros, and Lesotho; and Pot 3 contained Seychelles and Mauritius, who did not compete in the previous edition.

Pot 1	Pot 2	Pot 3
Zimbabwe; Botswana; Namibia; Angola	Eswatini; Madagascar; Lesotho; Comoros	Mauritius; Seychelles

== Venues ==
Gqeberha has been selected as the host city for this year's tournament, with two venues located within the city itself and one in the nearby iBhayi township, including the renowned Nelson Mandela Bay Stadium.

Gqeberha		Ibhayi	2024 COSAFA Women's Championship is located in South Africa
Nelson Mandela Bay Stadium	Madibaz Stadium	Wolfson Stadium	2024 COSAFA Women's Championship is located in South Africa
Capacity: 42,486	Capacity: 15,000	Capacity: 10,000	2024 COSAFA Women's Championship is located in South Africa

== Officials ==
COSAFA appointed 11 referees, 11 assistant referees, and 3 video assistant referees for the tournament. VAR was introduced from Matchday Three onward, a shift from the previous edition where it was only implemented starting from the semifinals.

Referees

- (Angola) Tânia Marisa Duarte
- (Botswana) Seonyatseng Tshephe
- (Lesotho) Nteboheleng Setoko
- (Malawi) Eness Gumbo (Note: Main Referee and Video assistant referee)
- (Namibia) Vistoria Shangula
- (Namibia) Antsino Twanyanyukwa
- (South Africa) Akhona Makalima
- (Zambia) Gloria Sambumba
- (Zimbabwe) Mercy Mayimbo
- (Zimbabwe) Grace Gimo
- (Zimbabwe) Thanks Nyahuye

Assistant Referees

- (Botswana) Leungo Tsogang
- (Lesotho) Polotso Maapara (Note: Assistant Referee and Assistant video assistant referee)
- (Malawi) Bernadettar Kwimbira
- (Malawi) Mphatso M'matete
- (Mozambique) Roda Mondlane
- (Namibia) Olivia Amukuu
- (South Africa) Nandipha Menze
- (Zambia) Diana Chikotesha
- (Zambia) Lumbizai Musawa
- (Zambia) Mercy Zulu
- (Zimbabwe) Claris Simango

Video assistant referees

- (Eswatini) Letticia Viana
- (Mauritius) Imtehaz Heeralall
- (South Africa) Abongile Tom

== Group stage ==
All times are local, SAST (UTC+2). The match schedule was announced by COSAFA on 9 October 2024.

Tie-breaking criteria for group play
The ranking of teams in the group stage was determined as follows:
1. Points obtained in the matches played between the teams in question (three points for a win, one for a draw, none for a defeat);
2. Goal difference in the matches played between the teams in question;
3. Number of goals scored in the matches played between the teams in question;
4. Goal difference in all group matches;
5. Fair play points in all group matches (only one deduction could be applied to a player in a single match):
  - Yellow card: −1 point;
  - Indirect red card (second yellow card): −3 points;
  - Direct red card: −4 points;
  - Yellow card and direct red card: −5 points;
6. Drawing of lots.

=== Group A ===
Pos	Team	Pld	W	D	L	GF	GA	GD	Pts	Qualification
1	South Africa (H)	3	3	0	0	12	1	+11	9	Advance to knockout stage
2	Namibia	3	2	0	1	9	1	+8	6	
3	Eswatini	3	1	0	2	6	5	+1	3	
4	Seychelles	3	0	0	3	1	21	−20	0	

Source: Soccerway
Rules for classification: Tiebreakers
(H) Hosts
22 October 2024
14:00

Eswatini	6–0	Seychelles
Nkambule 4', 53'; Ngcamphalala 45+3', 62', 66'; Ndlovu 70'	Report

Nelson Mandela Bay Stadium, Gqeberha
Referee: Akhona Makalima (South Africa)
22 October 2024
17:00

South Africa	1–0	Namibia
Motlogelwa 84'	Report

Nelson Mandela Bay Stadium, Gqeberha
Referee: Thanks Nyahuye (Zimbabwe)

25 October 2024
12:00

Namibia	7–0	Seychelles
Amukoto 6'; Vliete 29', 30', 51'; Kooper 62', 90'; Coleman 76' (pen.)	Report

Isaac Wolfson Stadium, Ibhayi
Referee: Eness Gumbo (Malawi)
25 October 2024
15:00

South Africa	3–0	Eswatini
Mdelwa 41'; Williams 55'; Moosa 87'	Report

Isaac Wolfson Stadium, Ibhayi
Referee: Antsino Twanyanyukwa (Namibia)

28 October 2024
15:00

Eswatini	0–2	Namibia
	Report	Coleman 12', 66'

Isaac Wolfson Stadium, Ibhayi
Referee: Gloria Sambumba (Zambia)
28 October 2024
15:00

South Africa	8–1	Seychelles
Hendricks 11', 26', 51'; Phahla 24'; Motlogelwa 44'; Mkhwanazi 45+6', 56'; Moosa 52'	Report	Pas. Moustache 74' (pen.)

Madibaz Stadium, Gqeberha
Referee: Grace Gimo (Zimbabwe)

=== Group B ===
Pos	Team	Pld	W	D	L	GF	GA	GD	Pts	Qualification
1	Malawi	3	2	1	0	11	1	+10	7	Advance to knockout stage
2	Botswana	3	1	2	0	6	1	+5	5	
3	Madagascar	3	1	1	1	5	2	+3	4	
4	Mauritius	3	0	0	3	1	19	−18	0	

Source: Soccerway
Rules for classification: Tiebreakers
23 October 2024
12:00

Madagascar	5–1	Mauritius
Razananivo Mamonjy 6'; Rasoanandrasana 18', 37'; Randrianarivelo 45+2' (pen.); Nambininjanahary 89'	Report	Gopal 67'

Isaac Wolfson Stadium, Ibhayi
Referee: Gloria Sambumba (Zambia)
23 October 2024
15:00

Malawi	1–1	Botswana
Chinzimu 28'	Report	Moloi 40'

Isaac Wolfson Stadium, Ibhayi
Referee: Nteboheleng Setoko (Lesotho)

26 October 2024
12:00

Botswana	5–0	Mauritius
Dithebe 5'; Ontlametse 45+4'; Modise 58', 60', 69' (pen.)	Report

Madibaz Stadium, Gqeberha
Referee: Tania Marisa Duarte (Angola)
26 October 2024
15:00

Malawi	1–0	Madagascar
Simwaka 7'	Report

Madibaz Stadium, Gqeberha
Referee: Seonyatseng Tshephe (Botswana)

28 October 2024
12:00

Madagascar	0–0	Botswana
	Report

Isaac Wolfson Stadium, Ibhayi
Referee: Mercy Chipo Mayimbo (Zimbabwe)
28 October 2024
12:00

Mauritius	0–9	Malawi
	Report	Chinyamula 8', 51', 79'; Thom 23' (pen.), 70' (pen.), 83'; Simwaka 27'; Kachala 86'; Kenneth 90+13' (pen.)

Madibaz Stadium, Gqeberha
Referee: Nteboheleng Setoko (Lesotho)

=== Group C ===
Pos	Team	Pld	W	D	L	GF	GA	GD	Pts	Qualification
1	Zambia	2	2	0	0	10	0	+10	6	Advance to knockout stage
2	Comoros	2	1	0	1	3	8	−5	3	
3	Angola	2	0	0	2	1	6	−5	0	

Source: Soccerway
Rules for classification: Tiebreakers
24 October 2024
12:00

Zambia	3–0	Angola
Lubandji 30'; Namasiku 47'; Chanda 72'	Report

Isaac Wolfson Stadium, Ibhayi
Referee: Grace Gimo (Zimbabwe)

27 October 2024
12:00

Angola	1–3	Comoros
Marlene 57'	Report	Chanfi 2'; Ahamada 25'; Al. Saïd 49'

Madibaz Stadium, Gqeberha
Referee: Thanks Nyahuye (Zimbabwe)

29 October 2024
12:00

Zambia	7–0	Comoros
Mukoma 6', 10', 75'; Lubanji 8', 61'; Chanda 45+3'; Mubanga 81'	Report

Madibaz Stadium, Gqeberha
Referee: Antsino Twanyanyukwa (Namibia)

=== Group D ===
Pos	Team	Pld	W	D	L	GF	GA	GD	Pts	Qualification
1	Mozambique	2	1	1	0	2	1	+1	4	Advance to knockout stage
2	Zimbabwe	2	1	0	1	3	1	+2	3	
3	Lesotho	2	0	1	1	1	4	−3	1	

Source: Soccerway
Rules for classification: Tiebreakers
24 October 2024
15:00

Mozambique	1–0	Zimbabwe
Aurora 18'	Report

Isaac Wolfson Stadium, Ibhayi
Referee: Vistoria Nuusiku Shangula (Namibia)

27 October 2024
15:00

Zimbabwe	3–0	Lesotho
Chinyerere 60', 90+2'; Katona 69'	Report

Madibaz Stadium, Gqeberha
Referee: Vistoria Nuusiku Shangula (Namibia)

29 October 2024
15:00

Mozambique	1–1	Lesotho
Ninika 87'	Report	Potsane 30'

Madibaz Stadium, Gqeberha
Referee: Akhona Makalima (South Africa)

== Knockout stage ==
- In the knockout stage, extra time and a penalty shoot-out were used to decide the winner if necessary.

=== Bracket ===
Semi-finals
31 October – Ibhayi
Malawi	0
Zambia	2
31 October – Ibhayi
South Africa (p)	1 (4)
Mozambique	1 (1)

Final
2 November – Ibhayi
Zambia (p)	0 (4)
South Africa	0 (3)

=== Semi-finals ===
31 October 2024
12:00

Malawi	0–2	Zambia
	Report	Lubandji 46'; Mukoma 68'

Wolfson Stadium, Ibhayi
Referee: Vistoria Nuusiku Shangula (Namibia)
31 October 2024
15:00

South Africa	1–1	Mozambique
Motlogelwa 45+4' (pen.)	Report	Célia 34'
Penalties
Ludwig (penalty scored); Motlogelwa (penalty scored); Mdelwa (penalty scored); Hendricks (penalty scored)	4–1	(penalty missed) Chingueleze; (penalty scored) Joana; (penalty missed) Aurora

Wolfson Stadium, Ibhayi
Referee: Mercy Mayimbo (Zimbabwe)

=== Final ===
South Africa and Zambia played the final for the third time in the competition's history, following previous encounters in 2019 and 2022, both of which ended 1–0 (one win for South Africa and one for Zambia). the Host Banyana Banyana enters as the record champion with seven titles, while the Copper Queens holds one. The two teams have met six times in the competition's history, with South Africa winning three matches and Zambia one, while the other two encounters ended in draws, each team winning the shootout once.

2 November 2024
15:00

Zambia	0–0 (a.e.t.)	South Africa
	Report
Penalties
Namasiku (penalty scored); Chomba (penalty scored); Musole (penalty scored); Mulenga (penalty scored)	4–3	(penalty scored) Ludwig; (penalty missed) Pila; (penalty scored) Mdelwa; (penalty scored) Hendricks; (penalty missed) Hadebe

Wolfson Stadium, Ibhayi
Referee: Antsino Twanyanyukwa (Namibia)

Zambia	South Africa

Formation: 4–2–3–1
GK	18	Ng'ambo Musole
LB	2	Melody Kapimpi
CB	19	Jackline Chomba
CB	5	Pauline Zulu
RB	8	Margaret Belemu (c)
DM	12	Evarine Katongo
DM	13	Esther Muchinga		(substituted off) 57'
LW	23	Lungowe Namasiku
CM	10	Regina Chanda		(substituted off) 57'
RW	11	Fridah Mukoma	(yellow card) 14'
CF	9	Ochumba Lubandji	(yellow card) 73'
Substitutions:
MF	6	Esther Mushota		(substituted on) 57'
MF	17	Majory Mulenga		(substituted on) 57'
Manager:
Florence Mwila

Formation: 4–3–3
GK	1	Jessica Williams
LB	5	Yolanda Nduli
CB	3	Sikelelwa Mhlanga
CB	4	Ntando Phahla
RB	18	Shannon Macomo
LM	6	Thalea Smidt (c)	(yellow card) 101'
CM	19	Khutso Pila
RM	8	Isabella Ludwig	(yellow card) 93'
LW	2	Asanda Hadebe
CF	13	Nobahle Mdelwa
RW	9	Tshogofatso Motlogelwa		(substituted off) 78'
Substitutions:
MF	11	Kesha Hendricks		(substituted on) 78'
Manager:
Maude Khumalo

Player of the Match:
Evarine Katongo (Zambia)

Assistant referees:
Claris Simango (Zimbabwe)
Leungo Tsogang (Botswana)
Fourth official:
Eness Gumbo (Malawi)
Video assistant referee:
Letticia Viana (Eswatini)
Assistant video assistant referee:
Imtehaz Heeralall (Mauritius)

== Award ==
The following awards were given at the conclusion of the tournament: the Golden Boot (top scorer), Golden Ball (best overall player) and Golden Glove (best goalkeeper).

Golden Boot
(Zambia) Fridah Mukoma	(Zambia) Ochumba Lubandji
Golden Ball
(South Africa) Isabella Ludwig
Golden Glove
(South Africa) Jessica Williams
COSAFA Fair Play Trophy
Zambia

== Statistics ==
=== Goal scorers ===
There were 75 goals scored in 21 matches, for an average of 3.57 goals per match.

4 goals

- (Zambia) Ochumba Lubandji
- (Zambia) Fridah Mukoma

3 goals

- (Botswana) Jessica Modise
- (Eswatini) Tenanile Ngcamphalala
- (Malawi) Leticia Chinyamula
- (Malawi) Sabina Thom
- (Namibia) Zenatha Coleman
- (Namibia) Fiola Vliete
- (South Africa) Kesha Hendricks
- (South Africa) Tshogofatso Motlogelwa

2 goals

- (Eswatini) Celiwe Nkambule
- (Madagascar) Marie Sarah Rasoanandrasana
- (Malawi) Asimenye Simwaka
- (Namibia) Ivone Kooper
- (South Africa) Sinamile Mkhwanazi
- (South Africa) Ayesha Moosa
- (Zambia) Regina Chanda
- (Zimbabwe) Ethel Chinyerere

1 goal

- (Angola) Marlene
- (Botswana) Keitumetse Dithebe
- (Botswana) Laone Moloi
- (Botswana) Gaonyadiwe Ontlametse
- (Comoros) Haloua Ahamada
- (Comoros) Alicia Chanfi
- (Comoros) Aliya Saïd
- (Eswatini) Nokuthula Ndlovu
- (Lesotho) Nthabaleng Potsane
- (Madagascar) Louisa Nambininjanahary
- (Madagascar) Haingo Ny Kanto Randrianarivelo
- (Madagascar) Solomampionona Razananivo Mamonjy
- (Malawi) Faith Chinzimu
- (Malawi) Catherine Kachala
- (Malawi) Maureen Kenneth
- (Mauritius) Julie Gopal
- (Mozambique) Aurora Ngale
- (Mozambique) Célia Miguel
- (Mozambique) Ninika
- (Namibia) Twelikondjele Amukoto
- (Seychelles) Pascalina Moustache
- (South Africa) Nobahle Mdelwa
- (South Africa) Ntando Phahla
- (South Africa) Jessica Williams
- (Zambia) Charity Mubanga
- (Zambia) Lungowe Namasiku
- (Zimbabwe) Christabel Katona

=== Discipline ===
A player was automatically suspended for the next match for the following offences:

- Receiving a red card (red card suspensions may be extended for serious offences)
- Receiving two yellow cards in two matches; yellow cards expire after the completion of the group stage (yellow card suspensions are not carried forward to any other future international matches)

The following suspensions were served during the tournament:

Player	Offence(s)	Suspension
(Madagascar) Marie Sarah Rasoanandrasana	(red card) in Group B vs Botswana (matchday 3; 28 October)	Suspension served outside tournament
(Botswana) Lone Gaofetoge	(yellow card) (yellow-red card) in Group B vs Madagascar (matchday 3; 28 October)	Suspension served outside tournament
(Comoros) Nasrine Hadharay	(red card) in Group C vs Zambia (matchday 3; 29 October)	Suspension served outside tournament
(Lesotho) Moseme Khashane	(yellow card) (yellow-red card) in Group D vs Mozambique (matchday 3; 29 October)	Suspension served outside tournament

=== Final ranking ===
Pos	Grp	Team	Pld	W	D	L	GF	GA	GD	Pts	Final Result
1	C	Zambia	4	3	1	0	12	0	+12	10	Champions
2	A	South Africa	5	3	2	0	13	2	+11	11	Runners-up
3	B	Malawi	4	2	1	1	11	3	+8	7	Eliminated in the Semi-finals
4	D	Mozambique	3	1	2	0	3	2	+1	5	Eliminated in the Semi-finals
5	A	Namibia	3	2	0	1	9	1	+8	6	Eliminated in the Group stage
6	B	Botswana	3	1	2	0	6	1	+5	5	Eliminated in the Group stage
7	D	Zimbabwe	2	1	0	1	3	1	+2	3	Eliminated in the Group stage
8	C	Comoros	2	1	0	1	3	8	−5	3	Eliminated in the Group stage
9	B	Madagascar	3	1	1	1	5	2	+3	4	Eliminated in the Group stage
10	A	Eswatini	3	1	0	2	6	5	+1	3	Eliminated in the Group stage
11	D	Lesotho	2	0	1	1	1	4	−3	1	Eliminated in the Group stage
12	C	Angola	2	0	0	2	1	6	−5	0	Eliminated in the Group stage
13	B	Mauritius	3	0	0	3	1	19	−18	0	Eliminated in the Group stage
14	A	Seychelles	3	0	0	3	1	21	−20	0	Eliminated in the Group stage

Source: COSAFA
Rules for classification: Tiebreakers

== Broadcasting rights ==
Country	Broadcaster	Ref.
South Africa	SABC, SuperSport	
World	FIFA+	
World	COSAFA on YouTube	
