= Zambia national football team results (2020–present) =

This article provides details of international football games played by the Zambia national football team from 2020 to present.

== Results ==
Key
Win
Draw
Defeat

=== 2020 ===
7 October 2020 Friendly	Zambia	1–0	Malawi	Lusaka, Zambia
15:00 UTC+2	Sikombe 14'	Report		Stadium: National Heroes Stadium; Referee: Audrick Nkole (Zambia)

9 October 2020 Friendly	Kenya	2–1	Zambia	Nairobi, Kenya
15:00 UTC+2	Mwape 21' (o.g.); Nyakeya 36'	Report	Chabula 81'	Stadium: Nyayo National Stadium; Referee: Anthony Ogwajo (Kenya)

11 October 2020 Friendly	South Africa	1–2	Zambia	Rustenburg, South Africa
15:00 UTC+2	Dolly 66'	Report	Kampamba 78'; Zulu 82'	Stadium: Royal Bafokeng Stadium; Referee: Thulani Sibandze (Eswatini)

22 October 2020 Friendly	Ethiopia	2–3	Zambia	Addis Ababa, Ethiopia
16:00 UTC+3	Kebede 13'; Tamene 41' (pen.)	Report	Kampamba 40'; Kangwanda 87', 90+3'	Stadium: Addis Ababa Stadium

25 October 2020 Friendly	Ethiopia	1–3	Zambia	Addis Ababa, Ethiopia
16:00 UTC+3	Kebede 87'	Report	Chabula 15', 37'; Sikombe 25'	Stadium: Addis Ababa Stadium

12 November 2020 2021 AFCONQ	Zambia	2–1	Botswana	Lusaka, Zambia
18:00 UTC+2	Mwepu 45+1'; Sikombe 66'	Report	Orebonye 45'	Stadium: National Heroes Stadium; Referee: Jean-Jacques Ngambo (DR Congo)

16 November 2020 2021 AFCONQ	Botswana	1–0	Zambia	Francistown, Botswana
18:00 UTC+2	Gaolaolwe 6'	Report		Stadium: Francistown Stadium; Referee: Ishmael Chizinga (Malawi)

=== 2021 ===
19 January 2021 2020 CHAN	Zambia	2–0	Tanzania	Limbe, Cameroon
17:00 UTC+1	Sikombe 64' (pen.); Chabula 81'	Report		Stadium: Limbe Stadium; Referee: Lahlou Benbraham (Algeria)

23 January 2021 2020 CHAN	Zambia	1–1	Guinea	Limbe, Cameroon
17:00 UTC+1	Sautu 87'	Report	Kantabadouno 58'	Stadium: Limbe Stadium; Referee: Adil Zourak (Morocco)

27 January 2021 2020 CHAN	Namibia	0–0	Zambia	Limbe, Cameroon
20:00 UTC+1		Report		Stadium: Limbe Stadium; Referee: Andofetra Rakotojaona (Madagascar)

31 January 2021 2020 CHAN	Morocco	3–1	Zambia	Douala, Cameroon
17:00 UTC+1	Rahimi 1'; Ali Bemammer 8'; El Kaabi 39' (pen.)	Report	Phiri 80'	Stadium: Stade de la Réunification; Referee: Pacifique Ndabihawenimana (Burundi)

25 March 2021 2021 AFCONQ	Zambia	3–3	Algeria	Lusaka, Zambia
21:00 UTC+2	Daka 34' (pen.), 80' (pen.); C. Chama 52'	Report	Ghezzal 19'; Slimani 25', 55'	Stadium: National Heroes Stadium; Referee: Ali Mohamed Adelaid (Comoros)

29 March 2021 2021 AFCONQ	Zimbabwe	0–2	Zambia	Harare, Zimbabwe
21:00 UTC+2		Report	Daka 21', 90+2'	Stadium: National Sports Stadium; Referee: Molise Retselisitsoe (Lesotho)

5 June 2021 Friendly	Senegal	3–1	Zambia	Thiès, Senegal
19:00 UTC+0	Mané 21' (pen.); Diatta 31'; Sarr 44'	Report	Chanda 54'	Stadium: Stade Lat-Dior; Referee: Babacar Sarr (Mauritania)

8 June 2021 Friendly	Benin	2–2	Zambia	Cotonou, Benin
16:00 UTC+1	Soukou 12'; Roche 80'	Report	Phiri 19'; Mwape 45+1'	Stadium: Stade de l'Amitié; Referee: Komlanvi Aklassou (Togo)

13 June 2021 Friendly	Sudan	0–1	Zambia	Omdurman, Sudan
19:00 UTC+2		Report	Shamende 87'	Stadium: Al-Hilal Stadium; Referee: Samoal Mohamed El Fatih (Sudan)

3 September 2021 2022 World Cup qualification	Mauritania	1–2	Zambia	Nouakchott, Mauritania
16:00 UTC+0	Niass 69'	Report	Mwepu 10'; Mumba 57'	Stadium: Stade Olympique de Nouakchott; Referee: Ibrahim Nour El Din (Egypt)

7 September 2021 2022 World Cup qualification	Zambia	0–2	Tunisia	Ndola, Zambia
15:00 UTC+2		Report	Khazri 8' (pen.); Ben Slimane 90+2'	Stadium: Levy Mwanawasa Stadium; Attendance: 5,000; Referee: Eric Otogo-Castane (Gabon)

7 October 2021 2022 World Cup qualification	Equatorial Guinea	2–0	Zambia	Malabo, Equatorial Guinea
17:00 UTC+1	Coco 35'; Nsue 88'	Report		Stadium: Estadio de Malabo; Referee: Noureddine El Jaafari (Morocco)

10 October 2021 2022 World Cup qualification	Zambia	1–1	Equatorial Guinea	Lusaka, Zambia
18:00 UTC+2	F. Sakala 65'	Report	Bikoro 82'	Stadium: National Heroes Stadium; Referee: Bakary Gassama (Gambia)

13 November 2021 2022 World Cup qualification	Zambia	4–0	Mauritania	Lusaka, Zambia
15:00 UTC+2	Daka 34'; F. Sakala 37', 45+1' (pen.), 63'	Report		Stadium: National Heroes Stadium; Referee: Mahmood Ali Mahmood Ismail (Sudan)

16 November 2021 2022 World Cup qualification	Tunisia	3–1	Zambia	Tunis, Tunisia
20:00 UTC+1	Laïdouni 18'; Dräger 31'; Maâloul 43'	Report	F. Sakala 80'	Stadium: Stade Hammadi Agrebi; Referee: Pacifique Ndabihawenimana (Burundi)

=== 2022 ===
18 March 2022 Friendly	Iraq	3–1	Zambia	Baghdad, Iraq
20:00 UTC+3	Ismail 10' (pen.); Ibrahim 23'; Hussein 78'	Report	Natiq 29' (o.g.)	Stadium: Al-Madina Stadium; Attendance: 25,237; Referee: Yousif Saeed Hasan (Iraq)

25 March 2022 Friendly	Congo	1–3	Zambia	Antalya, Turkey
16:00 UTC+3	Mbenza 34' (pen.)	Report	Mwepu 20' (pen.); Kangwa 24'; Musonda 63'	Stadium: Mardan Sports Complex

27 March 2022 Friendly	Zambia	1–2	Benin	Antalya, Turkey
13:00 UTC+3	Kampamba 23'	Report	Soukou 35'; Aiyegun 83'	Stadium: Mardan Sports Complex; Referee: Batuhan Kolak (Turkey)

3 June 2022 2023 AFCON Q	Ivory Coast	3–1	Zambia	Yamoussoukro, Ivory Coast
19:00 UTC+0	Aurier 67'; Kouamé 76'; Sangaré 89'	Report	Daka 90+4'	Stadium: Stade de Yamoussoukro; Referee: Dahane Beida (Mauritania)

7 June 2022 2023 AFCON Q	Zambia	2–1	Comoros	Lusaka, Zambia
15:00 UTC+2	Mwepu 45+2'; K. Kangwa 88'	Report	Ben Nabouhane 13'	Stadium: National Heroes Stadium; Referee: Samuel Uwikunda (Rwanda)

24 July 2022 2022 African Nations Championship Q	Mozambique	0–0	Zambia	Mabuto, Mozambique
				Stadium: Estádio do Zimpeto

30 July 2022 2022 African Nations Championship Q	Zambia	0–1	Mozambique	Lusaka, Zambia
			Lau King	Stadium: National Heroes Stadium

23 September 2022 Friendly	Mali	1–0	Zambia	Bamako, Mali
19:00 UTC+0	Touré 6'	Report		Stadium: Stade du 26 Mars; Referee: Younoussa Tawel Camara (Guinea)

26 September 2022 Friendly	Mali	Abandoned	Zambia	Bamako, Mali
19:00 UTC+0				Stadium: Stade du 26 Mars
Note: The match was stopped after only 16 minutes due to heavy rain and was eventually abandoned.

=== 2023 ===
23 March 2023 AFCON Q	Zambia	3–1	Lesotho	Ndola, Zambia
18:00 UTC+2	F. Sakala 37'; L. Banda 53', 57'	Report	Bereng 33'	Stadium: Levy Mwanawasa Stadium; Referee: Messie Nkounkou (Congo)

26 March 2023 AFCON Q	Lesotho	0–2	Zambia	Johannesburg, South Africa
15:00 UTC+2		Report	Daka 14', 69'	Stadium: Dobsonville Stadium; Referee: Chelanget Sabila (Uganda)

17 June 2023 AFCON Q	Zambia	3–0	Ivory Coast	Ndola, Zambia
15:00 UTC+2	Aurier 31' (o.g.); Daka 48'; Kangwa 55'	Report		Stadium: Levy Mwanawasa Stadium; Referee: Bamlak Tessema Weyesa (Ethiopia)

9 September 2023 AFCON Q	Comoros	1–1	Zambia	Moroni, Comoros
22:00 UTC+3	B. Youssouf 45'	Report	Daka 71'	Stadium: Stade Omnisports de Malouzini; Referee: Pacifique Ndabihawenimana (Burundi)

17 November 2026 FIFA World Cup qualification	Zambia	4–2	Congo	Ndola, Zambia
18:00 UTC+2	Daka 5', 90+2'; Banda 43'; F. Sakala 69'	Report	Ganvoula 13'; Bassouamina 15'	Stadium: Levy Mwanawasa Stadium; Referee: Mahmoud El Banna (Egypt)

21 November 2026 FIFA World Cup qualification	Niger	2–1	Zambia	Marrakesh, Morocco
20:00 UTC+1	Moutari 6'; Goumey 28'	Report	Daka 50'	Stadium: Marrakesh Stadium; Attendance: 200; Referee: Abdulrazg Ahmed (Libya)

=== 2024 ===
17 January 2023 AFCON	DR Congo	1–1	Zambia	San-Pédro, Ivory Coast
20:00	Wissa 27'	Report	Kangwa 23'	Stadium: Laurent Pokou Stadium; Attendance: 15,478; Referee: Bamlak Tessema Weyesa (Ethiopia)

21 January 2023 AFCON	Zambia	1–1	Tanzania	San-Pédro, Ivory Coast
17:00	Daka 88'	Report	Msuva 11'	Stadium: Laurent Pokou Stadium; Attendance: 13,342; Referee: Djindo Louis Houngnandande (Benin)

24 January 2023 AFCON	Zambia	0–1	Morocco	San-Pédro, Ivory Coast
20:00		Report	Ziyech 37'	Stadium: Laurent Pokou Stadium; Attendance: 15,231; Referee: Patrice Tanguy (Gabon)

23 March Friendly	Zambia	2–2 (5–6 p)	Zimbabwe	Lilongwe, Malawi
08:00 UTC+2	Sunzu 5'; Chama 24'	Report	Bonne 30'; Musona 45+2'	Stadium: Bingu National Stadium; Attendance: 21,000; Referee: Dickens Mimisa
	Penalties
	Daka (penalty scored); Banda (penalty missed); Nsabata (penalty missed); Mphande (penalty scored); Chama (penalty scored); Mashata (penalty scored); Chepeshi (penalty scored); Sunzu (penalty missed)		Musona (penalty missed); Takwara (penalty scored); Lunga (penalty missed); Kadewere (penalty scored); Munetsi (penalty scored); Rinomhota (penalty scored); Donovan (penalty scored); Msendami (penalty scored)

26 March Friendly	Zambia	2–1	Malawi	Lilongwe, Malawi
08:00 UTC+2	Chama 17'; Daka 18'	Report	Bonne 30'	Stadium: Bingu National Stadium; Referee: Israel Mpaima

7 June 2026 FIFA World Cup qualification	Morocco	2–1	Zambia	Agadir, Morocco
20:00 UTC+1	Ziyech 6' (pen.); Ben Seghir 67'	Report	Chilufya 80'	Stadium: Adrar Stadium; Referee: Issa Sy (Senegal)

11 June 2026 FIFA World Cup qualification	Zambia	0–1	Tanzania	Ndola, Zambia
15:00 UTC+2		Report	Waziri 5'	Stadium: Levy Mwanawasa Stadium; Referee: Abdel Aziz Bouh (Mauritania)

27 June 2024 COSAFA Cup	Zambia	0–2	Kenya	Gqeberha, South Africa
18:00		Report	Odhiambo 8' (pen.); Otieno 19'	Stadium: Nelson Mandela Bay Stadium

30 June 2024 COSAFA Cup	Zambia	0–2	Zimbabwe	Gqeberha, South Africa
15:00		Report	Tapera 8'; Benhura 43'	Stadium: Isaac Wolfson Stadium

2 July 2024 COSAFA Cup	Comoros	1–0	Zambia	Gqeberha, South Africa
12:00	Ibroihim 61'	Report		Stadium: Nelson Mandela Bay Stadium

6 September 2025 AFCON Qualification	Ivory Coast	2–0	Zambia	Stade de la Paix, Bouaké
19:00 UTC+0	Krasso 73', 84'	Report		Referee: Mustapha Ghorbal (Algeria)

10 September 2025 AFCON Qualification	Zambia	3–2	Sierra Leone	Levy Mwanawasa Stadium, Ndola
15:00 UTC+2	K. Musonda 28'; Kampamba 70'; Kangwa 85'	Report	Kargbo 33'; Mustapha 73'	Referee: Aklesso Gnama (Togo)

11 October 2025 AFCON Qualification	Zambia	0–0	Chad	Levy Mwanawasa Stadium, Ndola
15:00 UTC+2		Report		Referee: Mahmoud El Banna (Egypt)

15 October 2025 AFCON Qualification	Chad	0–1	Zambia	Ahmadou Ahidjo Stadium, Yaoundé (Cameroon)
14:00 UTC+1		Report	K. Musonda 70'	Referee: Peter Waweru (Kenya)

15 November 2025 AFCON Qualification	Zambia	1–0	Ivory Coast	Levy Mwanawasa Stadium, Ndola
17:00 UTC+2	K. Musonda 43'	Report		Attendance: 49,800; Referee: Omar Artan (Somalia)

19 November 2025 AFCON Qualification	Sierra Leone	0–2	Zambia	Samuel Kanyon Doe Sports Complex, Monrovia (Liberia)
15:00 UTC+0		Report	Banda 54'; K. Musonda 71'	Referee: Yannick Malala (Congo DR)

=== 2025 ===
25 March Friendly	Russia	5–0	Zambia	Moscow, Russia
20:00 UTC+3	Glushenkov 8', 53', 58'; Vakhaniya 44'; Batrakov 73'	Report		Stadium: VTB Arena; Attendance: 20,864; Referee: Adel Al-Naqbi (United Arab Emirates)

6 June 2025 COSAFA Cup	Zambia	0–1	Comoros	Bloemfontein, South Africa
18:00 UTC+2		Report	Madi 31'	Stadium: Free State Stadium; Referee: Brighton Chimene (Zimbabwe)

11 June 2025 COSAFA Cup	Botswana	3–3	Zambia	Bloemfontein, South Africa
15:00 UTC+2	Kgamanyane 2'; Semadi 32' (pen.); Maponda 60'	Report	Zulu 45+3' (pen.); Sinkala 52'; Jo. Phiri 90' (pen.)	Stadium: Dr. Petrus Molemela Stadium; Referee: Akhona Makalima (South Africa)

8 September 2026 FIFA World Cup qualification	Zambia	0–2	Morocco	Ndola, Zambia
15:00 UTC+2		Report	En-Nesyri 7'; Igamane 47'	Stadium: Levy Mwanawasa Stadium; Attendance: 49,800; Referee: Louis Houngnandande (Benin)

8 October 2026 FIFA World Cup qualification	Tanzania	0–1	Zambia	Miburani, Tanzania
21:00 UTC+3		Report	Sakala 75'	Stadium: Benjamin Mkapa Stadium; Referee: Kalilou Traore (Ivory Coast)

12 October 2026 FIFA World Cup qualification	Zambia	0–1	Niger	Lusaka, Zambia
15:00 UTC+2			Sosah 56'	Stadium: National Heroes Stadium; Attendance: 49,800

15 November Friendly	South Africa	3–1	Zambia	Gqeberha, South Africa
15:00 UTC+2	Appollis 43'; Nkota 62'; Sithole 68'	Report	Sabobo 90+2'	Stadium: Nelson Mandela Bay Stadium; Referee: Naftal Negongo (Namibia)

18 November Friendly	Angola	3–2	Zambia	Luanda, Angola
17:00 UTC+1	Milson 5'; Luvumbo 41'; Mabululu 58'	Report	Lahne 21'; F. Sakala 48'	Stadium: Estádio 11 de Novembro; Attendance: 5000; Referee: Luxolo Badi (South Africa)

16 December Friendly	Zambia	0–2	DR Congo	Murcia, Spain
16:00 UTC+1		Report	Masuaku 21'; Bushiri 72'	Stadium: Pinatar Arena; Referee: Javier Alberola Rojas (Spain)

22 December 2025 AFCON Group A	Mali	1–1	Zambia	Casablanca, Morocco
15:00 UTC+1	Sinayoko 61'	Report	Daka 90+2'	Stadium: Mohammed V Stadium; Referee: Omar Artan (Somalia)

26 December 2025 AFCON Group A	Zambia	0–0	Comoros	Casablanca, Morocco
18:30 UTC+1		Report		Stadium: Mohammed V Stadium; Referee: Ahmad Heeralall (Mauritius)

29 December 2025 AFCON Group A	Zambia	0–3	Morocco	Rabat, Morocco
20:00 UTC+1	Kangwa (red card) 90+5'	Report	El Kaabi 9', 50'; Díaz 27'	Stadium: Prince Moulay Abdellah Stadium; Referee: Issa Sy (Senegal)

=== 2026 ===
28 March Friendly	Zambia	0–0 (9–8 p)	Malawi	Francistown, Botswana
15:00 UTC+2				Stadium: Obed Itani Chilume Stadium; Referee: Keabetswe Dintwa (Botswana)
	Penalties
	TBA (penalty scored); TBA (penalty scored); TBA (penalty scored); TBA (penalty scored); TBA (penalty scored); TBA (penalty scored); TBA (penalty scored); TBA (penalty missed); TBA (penalty scored); TBA (penalty scored)		TBA (penalty scored); TBA (penalty scored); TBA (penalty scored); TBA (penalty scored); TBA (penalty scored); TBA (penalty scored); TBA (penalty scored); TBA (penalty missed); TBA (penalty scored); TBA (penalty missed)

31 March Friendly	Argentina	5–0	Zambia	Buenos Aires, Argentina
20:30 ARG (UTC–3)	Alvarez 1'; Messi 43'; Otamendi 50' (pen.); Chanda 68' (own goal); Barco 90+4'	Report		Stadium: La Bombonera; Referee: Alexis Herrera (Venezuela)

31 March Friendly	Zambia	0–1	Zimbabwe	Francistown, Botswana
17:00 UTC+2		Report	Kafunti 88' (o.g.)	Stadium: Obed Itani Chilume Stadium; Referee: Moemedi Thabologang(Botswana)

== Forthcoming fixtures ==
The following matches are scheduled:

TBD 2027 AFCON qualification	Algeria	v	Zambia	TBD, Algeria
TBD				Stadium: TBD

TBD 2027 AFCON qualification	Zambia	v	Algeria	TBD, Zambia
TBD				Stadium: TBD

TBD 2027 AFCON qualification	Zambia	v	Togo	TBD, Zambia
TBD				Stadium: TBD

TBD 2027 AFCON qualification	Togo	v	Zambia	TBD, Togo
TBD				Stadium: TBD

TBD 2027 AFCON qualification	Zambia	v	Burundi	TBD, Zambia
TBD				Stadium: TBD

TBD 2027 AFCON qualification	Burundi	v	Zambia	TBD, Burundi
TBD				Stadium: TBD

== See also ==
- Zambia women's national football team results
