= 2025 Yongchuan International Tournament =

Tournament details
- Host country: China
- City: Chongqing
- Dates: 5–8 April 2025
- Teams: 4 (from 2 confederations)

Final positions
- Champions: China (6th title)
- Runners-up: Thailand
- Third place: Zambia
- Fourth place: Uzbekistan

Tournament statistics
- Matches played: 4
- Goals scored: 23 (5.75 per match)
- Top scorer: (China) Shao Ziqin (4 goals)

The 2025 Yongchuan International Tournament (Chinese: 2025年茶山竹海杯永川国际女子足球邀请赛) was the 7th edition of the Yongchuan International Tournament, an invitational women's football tournament held in Yongchuan District, Chongqing, China. The tournament will take place from 5 to 8 April 2025.

== Teams ==
Team	FIFA Rankings (March 2025)
China (host)	17
Thailand	47
Uzbekistan	50
Zambia	64

Philippines were initially set to compete but withdrew due to logistical issues. They were replaced by Uzbekistan.

== Venues ==
Chongqing	Yongchuan Sports Center is located in China
Yongchuan Sports Center	Yongchuan Sports Center is located in China
29.345833°N 105.933611°E	Yongchuan Sports Center is located in China
Capacity: 25,017	Yongchuan Sports Center is located in China

== Matches ==
All times are local, CST (UTC+8).

=== Semifinals ===
5 April 2025
15:30

China	5–0	Uzbekistan
Zhang Xin 43'; Shao Ziqin 45+2'; Li Mengwen 69'; Liu Jing 88' (pen.); Wang Yanwen 90'	Report

Yongchuan Sports Center, Chongqing
Referee: Azusa Sugino (Japan)
5 April 2025
19:35

Zambia	2–3	Thailand
Nachula 45'; Lubandji 60'		Promthongmee 36'; Phomsri 69'; Peng-ngam 73' (pen.)

Yongchuan Sports Center, Chongqing
Referee: Mu Mingxin (China)

=== Third place match ===
8 April 2025
15:30

Uzbekistan	3–4	Zambia
Turdiboeva 51'; Khabibullaeva 90+3', 90+4'	Report	Lungu 24'; Chipasula 26'; Mukoma 46'; Mupopo 73'

Yongchuan Sports Center, Chongqing
Referee: Tian Jin (China)

=== Final ===
8 April 2025
19:35

China	5–1	Thailand
Shao Ziqin 2', 11', 83'; Zhang Xin 47'; Wang Aifang 84'	Report	Phomsri 48'

Yongchuan Sports Center, Chongqing
Referee: Lê Thị Lý (Vietnam)
