= Jessica Williams (footballer) =

South African soccer player

Personal information
- Full name: Jessica Lemique Williams
- Date of birth: 2 December 1999 (age 26)
- Place of birth: Cape Town, South Africa
- Position: Goalkeeper

Team information
- Current team: Copenhagen
- Number: 31

Youth career
- –: Cape Town Spurs

Senior career*
Years	Team	Apps	(Gls)
2021	Vasco Da Gama		
2022–2023	TUT Matsatsantsa		
2024	Badgers		
2025	University of Cape Town		
2026–	Copenhagen		

International career
2018–2019	South Africa U-20		(2019–)
- * Club domestic league appearances and goals

Jessica Lemique Williams (born 2 December 1999) is a South African soccer player who plays as a goalkeeper for A-Liga club the Copenhagen and the South Africa women's national team.

Williams previously played for Spurs W.F.C and for Sasol Women's League side Badgers. In 2025 she joined SAFA Women's League club the University of Cape Town.

== International career ==
She competed for the South Africa women's U/20 in 2017 against Burundi.

She received her first call up for the women's senior team in 2019 against Jamaica. Williams competed for the senior women's national team at the 2024 COSAFA Women's Championship where she kept a clean sheet against Namibia.

She scored her first international goal when she converted a free-kick against Eswatini in a 3–0 win.

=== International clean sheets ===
No.	Date	Venue	Opponent	Result	Competition
1.	22 October 2024	Nelson Mandela Bay Stadium, Gqeberha, South Africa	Namibia	1–0	2024 COSAFA Women's Championship
2.	25 October 2024	Isaac Wolfson Stadium, Ibhayi, South Africa	Eswatini	3–0	2024 COSAFA Women's Championship
3.	28 October 2024	Madibaz Stadium, Gqeberha, South Africa	Seychelles	8–1	2024 COSAFA Women's Championship

=== International goals ===
No.	Date	Venue	Opponent	Score	Result	Competition
1.	24 October 2024	Isaac Wolfson Stadium, Ibhayi, South Africa	Eswatini	2–0	3–0	2024 COSAFA Women's Championship
