= Maude Khumalo =

South African former soccer player and coach

Personal information
- Full name: Maude Nombuso Khumalo

Team information
- Current team: University of Pretoria (head coach); South Africa U-20 (head coach)

International career
| Years | Team | Apps | (Gls) |
| 2002 | South Africa | | |

Managerial career
- 2018-: University of Pretoria
- 2023-: South Africa U-20
- 2024-2024: South Africa B

Maude Nombuso Khumalo is South African professional soccer manager and former player. She is the current head coach of SAFA Women's League side University of Pretoria and the South Africa women's national under-20 soccer team.

== International career ==
Khumalo competed for the South African women's national team at the 2002 COSAFA Women's Championship.

== Managerial career ==
=== University of Pretoria ===
In 2018 she joined the University of Pretoria as head coach in the Sasol Women's League.

In 2021 her side were runners-up at the 2021 Women's Varsity Football after losing 4-3 via penalties to the University of the Western Cape.

In 2022 she won the Gauteng Sasol Women's League and qualified for her maiden Sasol League National Championship. At the 2022 Sasol League National Championship her side were runners-up after losing 3-2 via penalties to Copperbelt Ladies from Limpopo. Her side gained promotion to the SAFA Women's League.

=== South Africa women's under-20 ===
Her side failed to qualify for the third round of the 2024 African U-20 Women's World Cup qualifiers on away goals after playing to a 2-2 aggregate draw against Burundi.

=== South Africa women's national team ===
Khumalo was appointed head coach for South Africa B team for the 2024 COSAFA Women's Championship.

== Honours ==
- Sasol League National Championship: runners-up: 2022
- Gauteng Sasol Women's League: 2022
- Women's Varsity Football: runners-up: 2021
