= Julie Gopal =

Mauritian footballer (born 2006)

Personal information
- Date of birth: April 10, 2006 (age 20)

International career
Years	Team	Apps	(Gls)
- Mauritius

Julie Gopal (born 10 April 2006) is a Mauritian footballer who plays as a midfielder.

== Early life ==
As a youth player, Gopal joined the Racing Club football school in Mauritius, helping the team win the Port-Louis International Tournament.

== Career ==
Gopal captained Mauritius internationally at youth level and helped the Mauritius women's national football team win their first game in an international tournament, scoring the winning goal against Pakistan.

== International goals ==
No.	Date	Venue	Opponent	Score	Result	Competition
1.	15 January 2023	Prince Saud bin Jalawi Stadium, Khobar, Saudi Arabia	Pakistan	2–1	2–1	2023 SAFF Women's International Friendly Tournament
2.	23 October 2024	Isaac Wolfson Stadium, Ibhayi, South Africa	Madagascar	1–4	1–5	2024 COSAFA Women's Championship
3.	4 June 2026	Côte d'Or National Sports Complex, Saint Pierre, Mauritius	Djibouti	2–1	2–1	2028 CAF Women's Olympic qualifying tournament

== Style of play ==
Gopal mainly operates as a midfielder.

== Personal life ==
Gopal started playing football through her father and grandfather.
