= Ireen Lungu =

Zambian footballer (born 1997)

Personal information
- Date of birth: 6 October 1997 (age 29)
- Height: 1.52 m (5 ft 0 in)
- Position: Midfielder

Team information
- Current team: Jiangsu Wuxi

Senior career*
Years	Team	Apps	(Gls)
–2023	Green Buffaloes		
2023–	BIIK Shymkent		

International career
- Zambia
Medal record
Representing Zambia
Women's Africa Cup of Nations
Third place	2022 Morocco
- * Club domestic league appearances and goals as of January 2023

Ireen Lungu (born 6 October 1997) is a Zambian footballer who plays as a midfielder for Sichuan and the Zambia women's national team.

== International career ==
Lungu represented Zambia at the 2018 Africa Women Cup of Nations. She was named to the Zambia squad for the 2023 FIFA Women's World Cup.

=== International goals ===
Scores and results list Zambia's goal tally first

No.	Date	Venue	Opponent	Score	Result	Competition
1	18 November 2018	Cape Coast Sports Stadium, Cape Coast, Ghana	Equatorial Guinea	2–0	5–0	2018 Africa Women Cup of Nations
2	29 November 2023	Estádio 22 de Junho, Luanda, Angola	Angola	4–0	6–0	2024 Women's Africa Cup of Nations qualification
3	8 April 2025	Yongchuan Sports Center, Chongqing, China	Uzbekistan	1–0	4–3	2025 Yongchuan International Tournament

== Honours ==
Zambia

- COSAFA Women's Championship: 2022
