= Fiola Vliete =

Namibian footballer (born 1998)

Personal information
- Date of birth: 22 October 1998 (age 28)
- Place of birth: Rehoboth, Namibia
- Position: Forward

Team information
- Current team: Beauties
- Number: 10

Senior career*
Years	Team	Apps	(Gls)
2018–2021	V-Power Angels		
2023–	Beauties		

International career
2021–	Namibia	12	(3)
- * Club domestic league appearances and goals

Fiola Vliete (born 22 October 1998) is a Namibian footballer who plays as a forward for Beauties in the FNB Women's Super League and the Namibia national team.

Vliete played as a goalkeeper, then switched to the position of a striker.

== Early life ==
Vliete grew up in Block E, Rehoboth, Namibia She attended Oanob Primary and Rehoboth High School. She started playing Street football at a very young age, eventually leading her to join the local club, Rehoboth Amakrombies FC.

== Club career ==
Since 2023, Vliete has been a player for Beauties Football Club.

== International career ==
In 2021, She got her first call-up to the Namibia national team for two friendly matches against Angola. On 7 April 2021, she made her debut in a 4–0 win over the Angolan team coming on a substitute for Memory Ngonda in the 71st minute. From 2021 onward, Vliete became a regular member of the Namibian squad, representing her country in the COSAFA Women's Championship for four straight years: 2021, 2022, 2023, and 2024. In the 2024 edition, Vliete scored her first goals for the Brave Gladiators, netting a hat-trick against Seychelles on the second matchday.

=== International goals ===
No.	Date	Venue	Opponent	Score	Result	Competition
1.	25 October 2024	Ibhayi, South Africa	Seychelles	2–0	7–0	2024 COSAFA Women's Championship
2.	25 October 2024	Ibhayi, South Africa	Seychelles	3–0	7–0	2024 COSAFA Women's Championship
3.	25 October 2024	Ibhayi, South Africa	Seychelles	4–0	7–0	2024 COSAFA Women's Championship
