= Sinamile Mkhwanazi =

South African soccer player

Personal information
- Date of birth: 6 January 2004 (age 22)
- Position: Midfielder

Team information
- Current team: University of the Western Cape
- Number: 12

College career
Years	Team	Apps	(Gls)
2022-2024	University of Pretoria		
2025-	University of the Western Cape		

International career
2024-	South Africa	1	(2)

Sinamile Mkhwanazi (born 6 January 2004) is a South African soccer player who plays as a midfielder for SAFA Women's League club UWC Ladies and the South Africa women's national team.

== College career ==
She currently plays for Tuks Ladies. At the 2022 Sasol League National Championship final she scored the goal that helped her side to a 1-1 draw against Copperbelt Ladies but her team later lost the final via penalties.

== International career ==
Mkhwanazi competed for the senior women's national team at the 2024 COSAFA Women's Championship.

=== International goals ===
No.	Date	Venue	Opponent	Score	Result	Competition
1.	28 October 2024	Madibaz Stadium, Gqeberha, South Africa	Seychelles	5–0	8–1	2024 COSAFA Women's Championship
2.	28 October 2024	Madibaz Stadium, Gqeberha, South Africa	Seychelles	8–0	8–1	2024 COSAFA Women's Championship

== Honours ==
- Sasol League National Championship: Runners-up: 2022
