= Fridah Mukoma =

Zambian footballer (born 2006)

Personal information
- Date of birth: 13 October 2006 (age 20)
- Position: Forward

Team information
- Current team: Beijing (on loan from the Kansas City Current)
- Number: 71

Senior career*
Years	Team	Apps	(Gls)
2023–2025	Beijing	38	(9)
2025–	Kansas City Current	0	(0)
2025	→ Beijing (loan)		

International career^{‡}
–2023	Zambia U17	2	(0)
2024–	Zambia	4	(4)
- * Club domestic league appearances and goals ‡ National team caps and goals as of 2 November 2024

Fridah Mukoma (born 13 October 2006) is a Zambian footballer who plays a forward for Chinese Women's Super League club Beijing, on loan from National Women's Soccer League (NWSL) side Kansas City Current and the Zambia national team.

== Club career ==
She was awarded Young Player of the Year for the 2023/24 ZPL Women's Super League season on 22 June 2024.

On 12 March 2025, she was announced at Kansas City Current, being immediately loaned to Beijing Jingtan FC.

== International career ==
In April 2024, she received a call-up to the under-17 team to play against Uganda in a doubleheader for the 2024 African U-17 Women's World Cup qualification.

Eighteen-year-old Mukoma earned her maiden call-up to the Zambia senior national team on 17 October 2024, after being named in the preliminary squad nine days earlier to participate in the 2024 COSAFA Women's Championship. On 29 October 2024, she scored her first goals for the team, scoring a hat-trick in a 7–0 victory over Comoros.

=== International goals ===
No.	Date	Venue	Opponent	Score	Result	Competition
1.	29 October 2024	Madibaz Stadium, Gqeberha, South Africa	Comoros	1–0	7–0	2024 COSAFA Women's Championship
2.	29 October 2024	Madibaz Stadium, Gqeberha, South Africa	Comoros	3–0	7–0	2024 COSAFA Women's Championship
3.	29 October 2024	Madibaz Stadium, Gqeberha, South Africa	Comoros	6–0	7–0	2024 COSAFA Women's Championship
4.	31 October 2024	Isaac Wolfson Stadium, Ibhayi, South Africa	Malawi	2–0	2–0	2024 COSAFA Women's Championship
5.	8 April 2025	Yongchuan Sports Center, Chongqing, China	Uzbekistan	3–0	4–3	2025 Yongchuan International Tournament
