= Ayesha Moosa =

South African soccer player

Personal information
- Date of birth: 30 October 2003 (age 22)
- Position: Midfielder

Team information
- Current team: University of Johhanesburg
- Number: 4

Youth career
- 2019-2023: Soweto Fabulous Ladies

College career
Years	Team	Apps	(Gls)
2024-2025	University of Johhanesburg		

Senior career*
Years	Team	Apps	(Gls)
2025-	CD Argual Femenina		

International career
2024-	South Africa		(2)
- * Club domestic league appearances and goals

Ayesha Moosa (born 30 October 2003) is a South African soccer player who plays as a midfielder for Segunda Federación club CD Argual Femenina and the South Africa women's national team.

== Youth career ==
In 2019 she joined Sasol Women's League side Soweto Fabulous Ladies. She was later selected for the Gauteng Future Champions 9-day training camp at the LaLiga Academy in Spain.

== College career ==
Moosa plays for SAFA Women's League side UJ Ladies.

== Club career ==
She joined Segunda Federación club CD Argual Femenina.

== International career ==
Moosa competed for the senior women's national team at the 2024 COSAFA Women's Championship.

=== International goals ===
No.	Date	Venue	Opponent	Score	Result	Competition
1.	25 October 2024	Isaac Wolfson Stadium, Ibhayi, South Africa	Eswatini	3–0	3–0	2024 COSAFA Women's Championship
2.	28 October 2024	Madibaz Stadium, Gqeberha, South Africa	Seychelles	7–0	8–1	2024 COSAFA Women's Championship
