= Isabella Ludwig =

South African soccer player

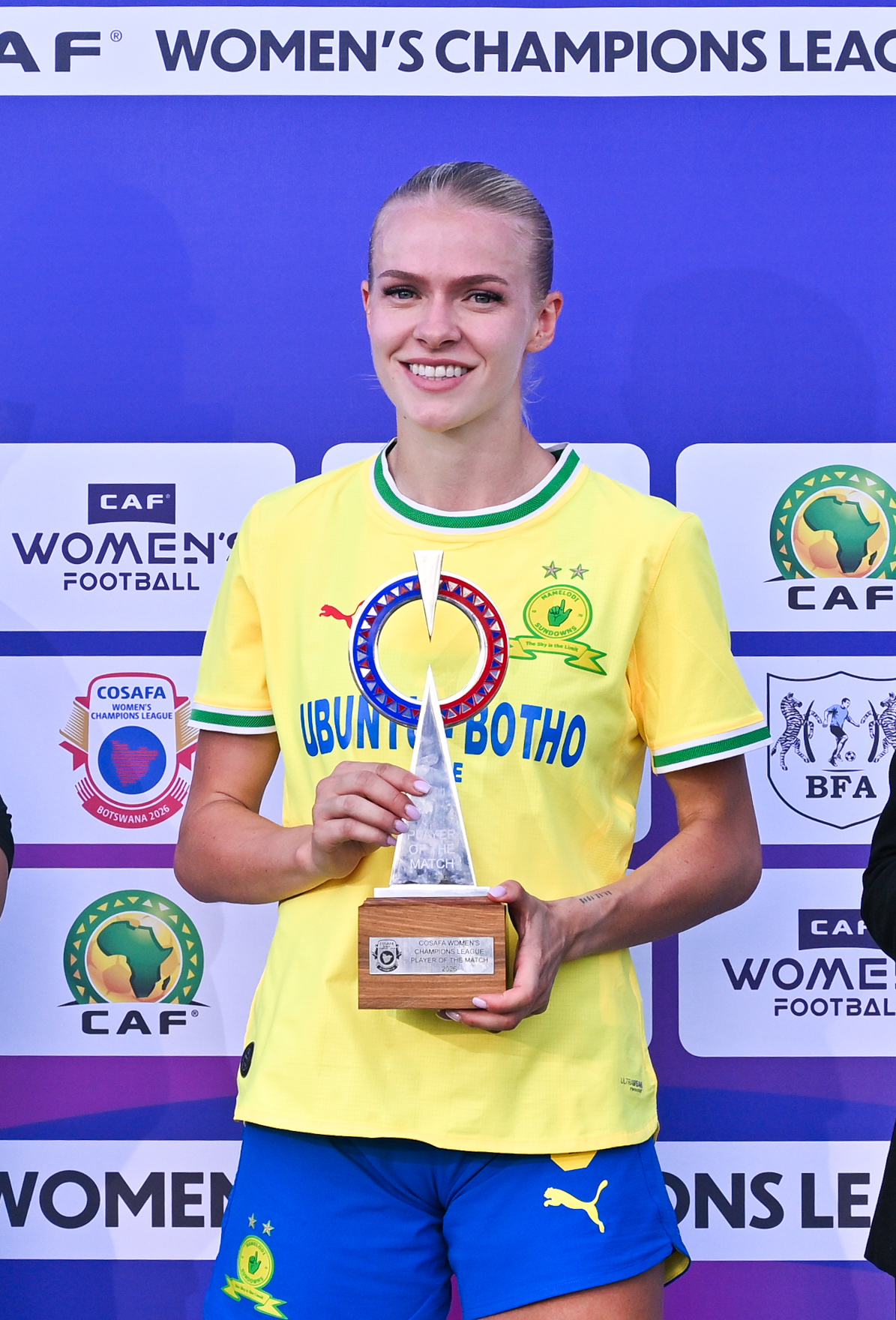
- Ludwig at the 2026 COSAFA WCL

Personal information
- Full name: Isabella Alexa Ludwig
- Date of birth: 13 December 2002 (age 23)
- Position: Midfielder

Team information
- Current team: Mamelodi Sundowns
- Number: 8

College career
Years	Team	Apps	(Gls)
2022–2025	University of Pretoria		

Senior career*
Years	Team	Apps	(Gls)
2025–	Mamelodi Sundowns	27	(9)

International career
2024–	South Africa	2	(0)
- * Club domestic league appearances and goals as of 20 January 2026

Isabella Alexa Ludwig (German: [ˈluːtvɪk]; born 13 December 2002) is a South African soccer player who plays as a midfielder for SAFA Women's League club Mamelodi Sundowns and the South Africa national team.

== College career ==
Ludwig played for Tuks Ladies and was part of the squad that were runners-up at the 2022 Sasol League National Championship.

== Club career ==
In April 2025 she signed with SAFA Women's League side Mamelodi Sundowns Ladies. She scored on debut against UCT Ladies in a 2–0 win on 12 April 2025.

== International career ==
Ludwig competed for the senior women's national team at the 2024 COSAFA Women's Championship. She made her debut on 22 October 2024 against Namibia. She made her Women's Africa Cup of Nations in 2026 against Tanzania in a 2–1 loss when she came on for Noxolo Cesane in th 89th minute.

== Honours ==
South Africa

- COSAFA Women's Championship runners-up: 2024, 2025

University of Pretoria

- Sasol League National Championship: Runners-up: 2022

Mamelodi Sundowns

- SAFA Women's League: 2025

Individual

- 2024 COSAFA Women's Championship: Player of the Tournament
