= Ntando Phahla =

South African soccer player (born 2006)

Personal information
- Date of birth: 12 March 2006 (age 20)
- Place of birth: Chesterville, South Africa
- Position: Defender

Team information
- Current team: University of Pretoria
- Number: 4

College career
Years	Team	Apps	(Gls)
2024–	University of Pretoria		

International career
2022–2023	South Africa U17		(1)
2024–	South Africa		(1)

Ntando Phahla (born 12 March 2006) is a South African soccer player who plays as a defender for SAFA Women's League club Tuks Ladies and the South Africa women's national team.

== College career ==
In 2024 she joined SAFA Women's League side Tuks Ladies.

== International career ==
Phahla competed for the senior women's national team at the 2024 COSAFA Women's Championship.

=== International goals ===
No.	Date	Venue	Opponent	Score	Result	Competition
1.	28 October 2024	Madibaz Stadium, Gqeberha, South Africa	Seychelles	2–0	8–1	2024 COSAFA Women's Championship
