= Celiwe Nkambule =

Liswati footballer

Personal information
- Full name: Celiwe Thandazile Nkambule
- Date of birth: 19 February 1993 (age 33)
- Height: 1.67 m (5 ft 6 in)
- Position: Forward

Team information
- Current team: Young Buffaloes

Senior career*
Years	Team	Apps	(Gls)
2014	Manzini Wanderers	6	(17)
2021	Young Buffaloes	79	(138)

International career
2020–	Eswatini	12	(4)
- * Club domestic league appearances and goals

Celiwe Thandazile Nkambule (born 19 February 1993) is a Liswati footballer who plays as a forward for Young Buffaloes FC and the Eswatini women's national team.

== Club career ==
Nkambule has played for Young Buffaloes in Eswatini.

== International career ==
Nkambule capped for Eswatini at senior level during two COSAFA Women's Championship editions (2020 and 2021).
