= Twelikondjele Amukoto =

Namibian footballer (born 1991)

Personal information
- Full name: Twelikondjele Evilyakondjelua Amukoto
- Date of birth: 28 July 1991 (age 35)
- Place of birth: Omuthiya, Namibia
- Height: 1.67 m (5 ft 6 in)
- Position: Defender

Team information
- Current team: Khomas Nampol (football and futsal)

Senior career*
Years	Team	Apps	(Gls)
- Khomas Nampol
- Khomas Nampol (futsal)

International career^{‡}
- Namibia
- * Club domestic league appearances and goals ‡ National team caps and goals as of 11 october 2014 (before the 2014 African Women's Championship)

Twelikondjele Evilyakondjelua Amukoto (born 28 July 1991) is a Namibian football and futsal player who plays as a defender for Khomas Nampol FC in both sports and for the Namibia women's national football team. She was part of the team at the 2014 African Women's Championship.
