= Kesha Hendricks =

South African soccer player

Personal information
- Date of birth: 29 November 2005 (age 20)
- Place of birth: Cape Town, South Africa
- Position: Forward

Team information
- Current team: University of Fort Hare
- Number: 7

College career
Years	Team	Apps	(Gls)
2023	University of Cape Town		
2024-	University of Fort Hare		

International career^{‡}
2024-	South Africa	2	(4)
- ‡ National team caps and goals as of 31 October 2024

Kesha Hendricks (born 29 November 2005) is a South African soccer player who plays as a forward for SAFA Women's League club UFH Ladies and the South Africa women's national team.

== College career ==
Hendricks is a student-athlete at the University of Fort Hare where she plays soccer for the women's team. She scored a goal on debut for the team in a 2–1 win over TUT Matsatsantsa.

== International career ==
She competed for the senior women's national team at the 2024 COSAFA Women's Championship. She made her debut against Namibia on 22 October 2024. She scored a hattrick against Seychelles in a 8–1 win to help the team top group A.

=== International goals ===
No.	Date	Venue	Opponent	Score	Result	Competition
1.	28 October 2024	Madibaz Stadium, Gqeberha, South Africa	Seychelles	1–0	8–1	2024 COSAFA Women's Championship
2.	28 October 2024	Madibaz Stadium, Gqeberha, South Africa	Seychelles	3–0	8–1	2024 COSAFA Women's Championship
3.	28 October 2024	Madibaz Stadium, Gqeberha, South Africa	Seychelles	7–0	8–1	2024 COSAFA Women's Championship
