= Evarine Katongo =

Zambian footballer (born 2002)

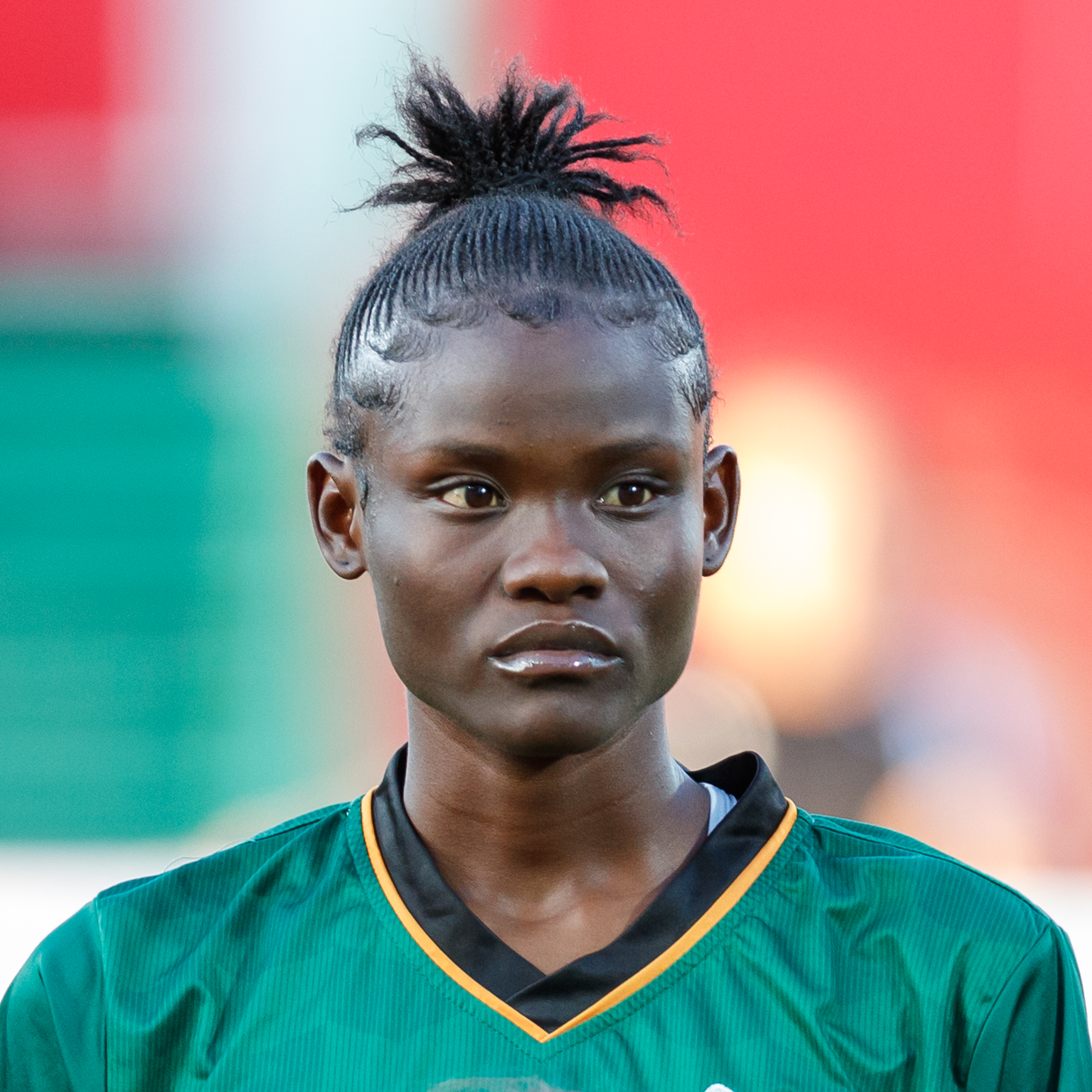

Personal information
- Full name: Evarine Suzeni Katongo
- Date of birth: 29 December 2002 (age 23)
- Height: 1.55 m (5 ft 1 in)
- Position: Midfielder

Team information
- Current team: Green Buffaloes
- Number: 12

Senior career*
Years	Team	Apps	(Gls)
2018–2023	ZISD Queens	50	(8)
2024–	Green Buffaloes		

International career
- Zambia
Medal record
Representing Zambia
Women's Africa Cup of Nations
Third place	2022 Morocco
- * Club domestic league appearances and goals

Evarine Suzeni Katongo (born 29 December 2002) is a Zambian footballer plays as a midfielder for Green Buffaloes and the Zambia women's national team. She was part of the Zambian Football team in the football competition at the 2020 Summer Olympics.

Katongo was named to the Zambia squad for the 2023 FIFA Women's World Cup.

== Honours ==
Zambia

- COSAFA Women's Championship: 2022
