= Margaret Belemu =

Zambian footballer (born 1997)

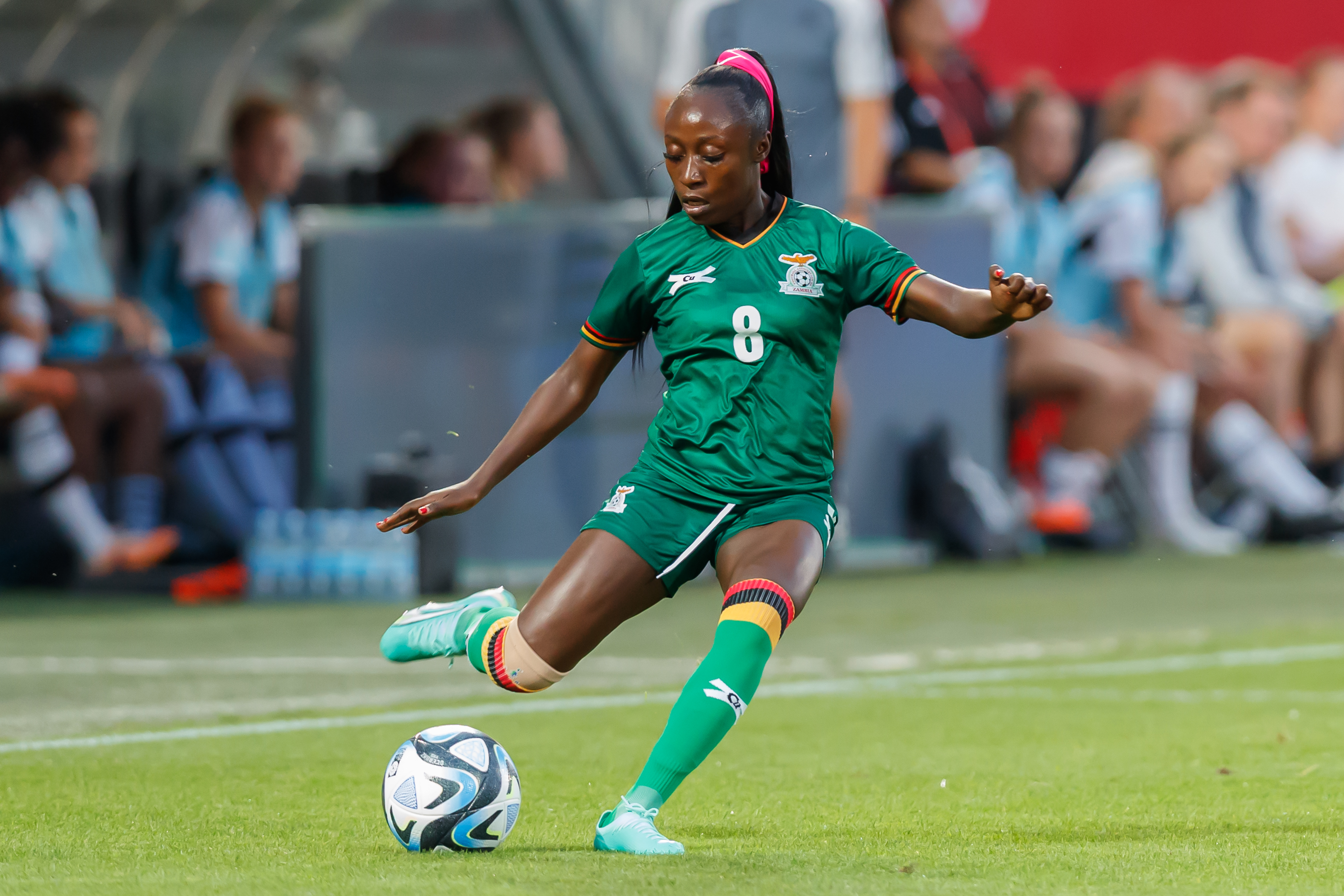

Personal information
- Date of birth: 24 February 1997 (age 29)
- Place of birth: Lusaka, Zambia
- Height: 1.52 m (5 ft 0 in)
- Position: Right-back

Team information
- Current team: Shanghai Shengli

Senior career*
Years	Team	Apps	(Gls)
- National Assembly F.C.
- Lusaka Foundation
- Yacha Girls
- Red Arrows F.C.
2022	Hakkarigücü Spor	13	(2)
2023–	Shanghai Shengli		

International career^{‡}
2014	Zambia U17	3	(0)
	Zambia	32	(0)
Medal record
Representing Zambia
Women's Africa Cup of Nations
Third place	2022 Morocco
- * Club domestic league appearances and goals ‡ National team caps and goals as of 5 February 2023

Margaret Belemu (born 24 February 1997) is a Zambian international footballer who plays as a right-back for Chinese Women's Super League club Shanghai Shengli and the Zambia women's national team.

== Club career ==
In September 2022, Belemu moved to Turkey and joined Hakkarigücü Spor to play in the 2022–23 Super League.

== International career ==
Belemu competed for Zambia at the 2018 Africa Women Cup of Nations, playing in three matches.

== Honours ==
Zambia

- COSAFA Women's Championship: 2022

Individual

- Women's Africa Cup of Nations Team of the Tournament: 2022
- IFFHS CAF Women's Team of The Year: 2022
