= Akhona Makalima =

South African football referee (born 1988)

- Full name: Akhona Zennith Makalima
- Born: 27 March 1988 (age 38); Nqamakwe, South Africa

Domestic
Years	League	Role

International
Years	League	Role
2014-	FIFA 2014 listed	Referee

Akhona Zennith Makalima (born 27 March 1988) is an international football referee from South Africa who has been a listed international referee for FIFA since 2014. She officiates for FIFA, COSAFA, the Premier Soccer League, and the South African Football Association (SAFA). She was the first female referee to officiate in the Premier Soccer League.

She holds a national diploma in human resource management from King Hintsa FET College and currently works as an administrator for the Department of Sport.

On 9 January 2023, FIFA appointed her to the officiating pool for the 2023 FIFA Women's World Cup in Australia.

She officiated the 2023 AFCON as a VAR referee.

She officiated as the VAR referee at the 2024 CAF Super Cup.

She officiated at the 2024 Women's Africa Cup of Nations.
