= Ochumba Lubandji =

Zambian footballer (born 2001)

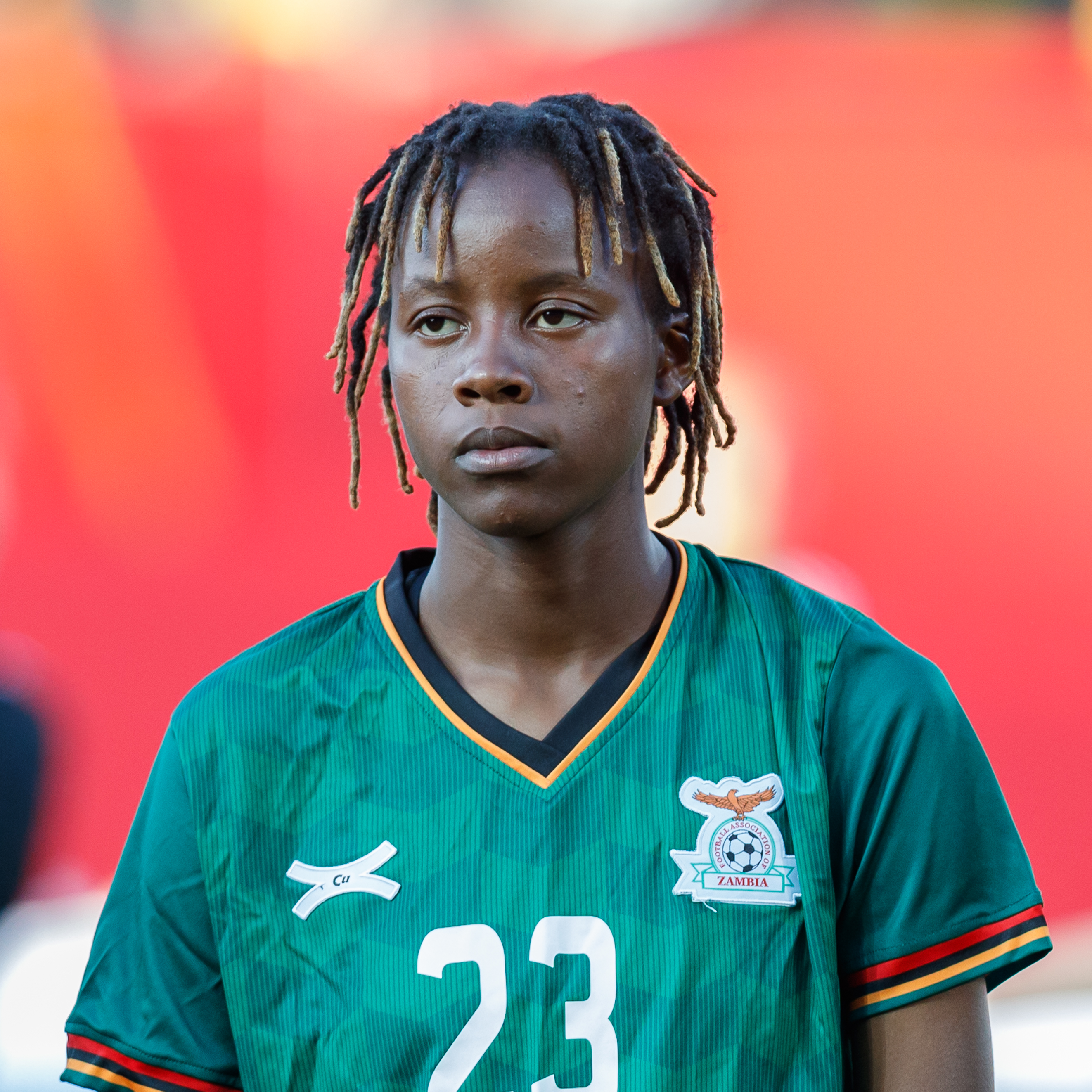

Personal information
- Full name: Ochumba Oseke Lubandji
- Date of birth: 1 July 2001 (age 25)
- Height: 1.73 m (5 ft 8 in)
- Position: Midfielder

Team information
- Current team: Red Arrows
- Number: 7

Senior career*
Years	Team	Apps	(Gls)
- Red Arrows

International career^{‡}
2018–	Zambia	20	(4)
Medal record
Representing Zambia
Women's Africa Cup of Nations
Third place	2022 Morocco
- * Club domestic league appearances and goals ‡ National team caps and goals as of 00:15, 5 October 2022 (UTC)

Ochumba Oseke Lubandji (born 1 July 2001) is a Zambian footballer who plays as a midfielder for Red Arrows F.C. and the Zambia women's national team.

== International career ==
Lubandji was called up to the Zambia squad for the 2018 Women's Africa Cup of Nations. She competed for Zambia at the 2018 Africa Women Cup of Nations, playing in one match.

On 2 July 2021, Lubandji was called up to the 23-player Zambia squad for the delayed 2020 Summer Olympics.

Lubandji was called up to the Zambia squad for the 2022 Women's Africa Cup of Nations, where they finished in third place.

She was named to the Zambia squad for the 2023 FIFA Women's World Cup.

On 3 July 2024, Lubandji was called up to the Zambia squad for the 2024 Summer Olympics.

== Honours ==
Zambia

- COSAFA Women's Championship: 2022
