= Comoros women's national football team results =

The Comoros women's national football team is the representative women's association football team of the Comoros. Its governing body is the Comoros Football Federation and it competes as a member of the Confederation of African Football (CAF). The national team's first match was in 2006.

== Record per opponent ==
Key

Positive balance (more wins than losses)
Neutral balance (as many wins as losses)
Negative balance (more losses than wins)

The following table shows Comoros's all-time official international record per opponent:

Opponent	Pld	W	D	L	GF	GA	GD	W%	Confederation
Angola	3	1	1	1	4	7	–3	33.33	CAF
Botswana	1	0	0	1	0	6	–6	0	CAF
Equatorial Guinea	1	0	0	1	0	4	−4	0	CAF
Eswatini	1	0	0	1	2	4	−2	0	CAF
Lebanon	2	0	1	1	1	5	−4	0	AFC
Madagascar	3	0	0	3	1	13	−12	0	CAF
Malawi	2	0	0	2	0	19	−19	0	CAF
Mauritius	2	2	0	0	5	1	+4	100	CAF
Mozambique	3	0	0	3	6	15	−9	0	CAF
Nigeria	2	0	0	2	0	7	−7	0	CAF
Pakistan	1	0	0	1	0	1	−1	0	AFC
Saudi Arabia	1	0	0	1	0	2	−2	0	AFC
South Africa	3	0	0	3	0	37	−37	0	CAF
Sudan	2	2	0	0	30	0	+30	100	CAF
Tanzania	1	0	0	1	0	3	−3	0	CAF
Tunisia	1	0	0	1	1	2	−1	0	CAF
Zambia	2	0	0	2	1	12	−11	0	CAF
Total	31	5	2	24	51	138	-84	16.12	—

As of 13 October 2026, after the match against Nigeria.

== Results ==
=== 2006 ===
26 October 2006 2008 Olympics qualification	Mozambique	7–2	Comoros	Matola, Mozambique
--:--		Report		Stadium: Estádio da Machava

12 November 2006 2008 Olympics qualification	Comoros	3–5	Mozambique	Comoros
--:--
Note: Also reported as not having been played.

=== 2014 ===
23 May 2014 2014 African Championship qualification	Comoros	0–13	South Africa	Mitsamiouli, Comoros
15:00 UTC+3		Report	Portia 13', 19', 43', 49' (pen.); Smeda 25', 34', 54', 60'; Ntsibande 64'; Mollo 65', 68'; Nogwanya 75' (pen.); Makhabane 85'	Stadium: Stade Said Mohamed Cheikh; Referee: Maria Rivet (Mauritius)

=== 2016 ===
5 December 2016 Friendly	Madagascar	4–0	Comoros	Mahajanga, Madagascar
--:--	Farafanirina 40', 45+1'; Solonilaina 50'; Razanampiavy 80'	Report		Stadium: Rabemananjara Stadium

8 December 2016 Friendly	Madagascar	4–0	Comoros	Mahajanga, Madagascar
--:--	Farafanirina 19', 60', 77'; Rasoanandrasana 90+2'	Report		Stadium: Rabemananjara Stadium

=== 2017 ===
26 November 2017 Friendly	Equatorial Guinea	4–0	Comoros	Malabo, Equatorial Guinea
15:00		Report		Stadium: Estadio de Malabo

=== 2018 ===
17 December 2018 2018 UFFOI Championship	Mauritius	0–3	Comoros	Quatre Bornes, Mauritius
13:00		Report	Attoumane; Abdourahmane; Ali	Stadium: MFA Stadium

=== 2019 ===
31 July 2019 2019 COSAFA Championship	South Africa	17–0	Comoros	Ibhayi, South Africa
15:30 UTC+2	Makhubela 16'; Fulutudilu 20'; Melanie 21' (o.g.); Makhabane 23'; Jane 38', 53', 79', 89'; Ndimeni 44'; Mbane 47', 63'; Mthandi 71', 78', 83'; Magaia 76', 81'; Biyana 81'	Report		Stadium: Isaac Wolfson Stadium

2 August 2019 2019 COSAFA Championship	Comoros	1–5	Madagascar	Ibhayi, South Africa
10:00 UTC+2	Mari 41'	Report	Nivonirina 1'; Razanampiavy 3'; Rasoanandrasana 20', 51'; Razananivo 45+2'	Stadium: Isaac Wolfson Stadium

5 August 2019 2019 COSAFA Championship	Malawi	13–0	Comoros	Port Elizabeth, South Africa
12:45 UTC+2	Simwaka 17', 17'; Kasenda 31', 43', 44', 48', 62', 67', 88', 90'; Thom 41', 47'; Kapanda 66'	Report		Stadium: Gelvandale Stadium

=== 2020 ===
3 November 2020 2020 COSAFA Championship	Eswatini	4–2	Comoros	Ibhayi, South Africa
--:--	Dlamini 65', 90+1'; Ngcamphalala 75'; Mokgale 87'	Report	Abdourahmane 15'; Hadhirami 53'	Stadium: Isaac Wolfson Stadium

6 November 2020 2020 COSAFA Championship	Comoros	1–1	Angola	Ibhayi, South Africa
--:--	Haoudadji 83'	Report	Cristina 66'	Stadium: Isaac Wolfson Stadium

9 November 2020 2020 COSAFA Championship	South Africa	7–0	Comoros	Ibhayi, South Africa
--:--	Holweni 8', 31', 49', 88', 90+2'; Magaia 42'; Kgoale 51'	Report		Stadium: Isaac Wolfson Stadium

=== 2022 ===
2 September 2022 2022 COSAFA Championship	Tanzania	3–0	Comoros	Gqeberha, South Africa
--:--	Minja 14'; Kasonga 42', 51'	Report		Stadium: NMU Stadium; Referee: Vistoria Shangula (Namibia)

5 September 2022 2022 COSAFA Championship	Malawi	6–0	Comoros	Gqeberha, South Africa
--:--	Chembekezo 18'; Kadzere 46'; Chawinga 63', 75', 82'; Mvula 90+1'	Report		Stadium: NMU Stadium; Referee: Nonjabulo Nonhle Ndlela (South Africa)

7 September 2022 2022 COSAFA Championship	Comoros	0–6	Botswana	Ibhayi, South Africa
--:--		Report	Ontlametse 3', 51', 53', 90'; Radiakanyo 43'; Mosotho 68'	Stadium: Isaac Wolfson Stadium; Referee: Mathabo Kolokotoane (Lesotho)

=== 2023 ===
11 January 2023 2023 SAFF Friendly Tournament	Pakistan	1–0	Comoros	Khobar, Saudi Arabia
16:30 UTC+3	Anmol 89'	Report		Stadium: Prince Saud bin Jalawi Sports City; Referee: Anoud Abdullah Al Asmari (Saudi Arabia)

15 January 2023 2023 SAFF Friendly Tournament	Comoros	0–2	Saudi Arabia	Khobar, Saudi Arabia
20:30 UTC+3		Report	Ibrahim 35'; Abu Laban 90+1'	Stadium: Prince Saud bin Jalawi Sports City; Referee: Shahenda El Maghrabi (Egypt)

19 January 2023 2023 SAFF Friendly Tournament	Mauritius	1–2	Comoros	Khobar, Saudi Arabia
16:30 UTC+3	Verloppe 63'	Report	Hadhirami Ali 19', 31'	Stadium: Prince Saud bin Jalawi Sports City; Referee: Shahenda El Maghrabi (Egypt)

5 October 2023 2023 COSAFA Championship	Angola	5–0	Comoros	Pretoria, South Africa
12:00 UTC+2	Caupe 4'; Luvunga 21'; Matuvova 24'; Nyoca Nsumbo 31'; S. Ali 45+3' (o.g.)	Report		Stadium: Lucas Moripe Stadium; Referee: Akhona Makalima (South Africa)

8 October 2023 2023 COSAFA Championship	Mozambique	3–1	Comoros	Johannesburg, South Africa
15:30 UTC+2	Gove 18', 51' (pen.); Saene 86'	Report	Hadhirami Ali 4'	Stadium: Dobsonville Stadium; Referee: Rosalie Rosalie (Madagascar)

10 October 2023 2023 COSAFA Championship	Zambia	5–1	Comoros	Johannesburg, South Africa
12:00 UTC+2	Kabwe 20', 59', 75'; Mweemba 60'; Jere 87' (pen.)	Report	Mohamed Ahamadi 42'	Stadium: UJ Stadium; Referee: Rosa Hanjavola (Madagascar)

=== 2024 ===
27 October 2024 2024 COSAFA Championship	Angola	1–3	Comoros	Gqeberha, South Africa
12:00 UTC+2	Marlene 57'	Report	Chanfi 2'; Ahamada 25'; Al. Saïd 49'	Stadium: Madibaz Stadium; Referee: Thanks Nyahuye (Zimbabwe)

29 October 2024 2024 COSAFA Championship	Zambia	8–0	Comoros	Gqeberha, South Africa
12:00 UTC+2	Mukoma 6', 10', 75'; Lubanji 8', 61'; Chanda 45+3'; Mubanga 81'	Report		Stadium: Madibaz Stadium; Referee: Antsino Twanyanyukwa (Namibia)

=== 2025 ===
5 April 2025 Friendly	Lebanon	1–1	Comoros	Beirut, Lebanon
15:00 UTC+3	Maalouf 74'	Report	Chamsoudine 90+4'	Stadium: Champville Stadium

7 April 2025 Friendly	Lebanon	4–0	Comoros	Jounieh, Lebanon
14:00 UTC+3	Al Kasti 23'; Khoury 28'; Maalouf 37', 65'			Stadium: Fouad Chehab Stadium

=== 2026 ===
16 April 2026 Friendly	Tunisia	2–1	Comoros	Manouba, Tunisia
14:00	Nouhaili 3'; Abbassi 77'		Dahmani 5'	Stadium: Manouba Sports Complex; Referee: Sirine Abdelmalek (Tunisia)

4 June 2026 2028 Olympic Qualification First round	Sudan	0–17	Comoros	Casablanca, Morocco
15:00 UTC+3		Report	Saïd Madjiri 8'; Al. Saïd 17', 42'; Boina Ali 31', 39', 54'; H. Ahamada 33', 49', 66', 89'; Dahmani 37'; Housseni 46'; Maoulida 52'; Anduma 56'; Houmadi 59', 87'; D. Saïd 69'	Stadium: Larbi Zaouli Stadium; Referee: Suzana Semere Yohannes (Eritrea)

8 June 2026 2028 Olympic Qualification First round	Comoros	13–0 (30–0 agg.)	Sudan	Casablanca, Morocco
18:00 UTC+1	Houmadi 12', 26', 67', 71'; Hadhirami Ali 40'; Maoulida 48', 62'; Haoudadji 53'; D. Saïd 57'; Ali 75'; H. Ahamada 85', 90+6'; Hassani 90+4'	Report		Stadium: Larbi Zaouli Stadium; Referee: Seonyatseng Tshephe (Botswana)

9 October 2026 2028 Olympic qualification Second round	Comoros	0–2	Nigeria	Ikenne, Nigeria
18:00 (UTC+01:00)		Report	Alozie 48'; Kanu 60'	Stadium: Remo Stars Stadium; Referee: Henriette Byukusenge (Rwanda)

13 October 2026 2028 Olympic qualification Second round	Nigeria	5–0 (7–0 agg.)	Comoros	Ikenne, Nigeria
16:00 (UTC+01:00)	Payne 41', 63'; Kanu 58', 66'; Ucheibe 71' (pen.)	Report		Stadium: Remo Stars Stadium

== Unofficial ==
19 December 2018 2018 UFFOI Championship	Comoros	6–0	Rodrigues	Quatre Bornes, Mauritius
13:00	Attoumane; Abdourahmane; Boinali	Report		Stadium: MFA Stadium

25 October 2024 Friendly	Comoros	4–0	Mauritius	Gqeberha, South Africa
13:00 UTC+2	Hadhirami; Houmadi; Ahamada	Report
Note: Not an official friendly match; a practice game (less than 90 minutes) with no rules on substitutions or other regulations.

== See also ==
- Comoros national football team results
