= Mauritius women's national football team results =

This article lists the results and fixtures for the Mauritius women's national football team.

== Record per opponent ==
Key

Positive balance (more wins than losses)
Neutral balance (as many wins as losses)
Negative balance (more losses than wins)

The following table shows Mauritius' all-time official international record per opponent:

Opponent	Pld	W	D	L	GF	GA	GD	W%	Confederation
Angola	1	0	0	1	0	3	−3	0.00	CAF
Botswana	4	0	0	4	0	19	−19	0.00	CAF
Comoros	2	0	0	2	1	5	−4	0.00	CAF
Djibouti	2	2	0	0	3	1	−2	100.00	CAF
Ghana	2	0	0	2	0	10	−10	0.00	CAF
Guinea	2	0	0	2	0	11	−11	0.00	CAF
Eswatini	1	0	0	1	0	3	−3	0.00	CAF
Kenya	1	0	0	1	0	11	−11	0.00	CAF
Madagascar	2	0	0	2	1	10	−9	0.00	CAF
Malawi	1	0	0	1	0	9	−9	0.00	CAF
Mayotte	1	0	0	1	0	5	−5	0.00	—
Mozambique	2	0	0	2	0	8	−8	0.00	CAF
Namibia	1	0	0	1	0	8	−8	0.00	CAF
Pakistan	1	1	0	0	2	1	+1	100.00	AFC
Réunion	3	0	0	3	2	8	−6	0.00	CAF
Rodrigues	4	4	0	0	12	1	+11	100.00	—
Saudi Arabia	1	0	0	1	0	1	−1	0.00	AFC
Seychelles	3	1	2	0	5	3	+2	33.33	CAF
South Africa	1	0	0	1	0	4	−4	0.00	CAF
Zambia	1	0	0	1	0	15	−15	0.00	CAF
Total	32	8	2	26	26	136	−110	25.00	—

== Results ==
=== 2012 ===
3 June 2012 Friendly	Réunion	3–0	Mauritius	Saint-Denis, Réunion
	Gorée 10'; Filain 14'; Lambert 24' (pen.)	Report		Stadium: La Redoute Stadium

25 November 2012 Friendly	Mauritius	1–2	Réunion	Bambous, Mauritius
		Report

=== 2015 ===
31 July 2015 2015 Indian Ocean Island GS	Madagascar	5–0	Mauritius	Saint-Denis, Réunion
	Farafanirina 4', 25', 60'; Ramiseheno 7', 37'	Report

4 August 2015 2015 Indian Ocean Island GS	Réunion	3–1	Mauritius	Saint-Denis, Réunion
	Grondin 10'; Palma 47'; Morel 54'	Report	Kelly 40'

=== 2016 ===
5 March 2016 2016 AFWCON qualification First round 1st leg	Botswana	7–0	Mauritius	Lobatse, Botswana
	Mahlasela 19', 52'; Otlhagile 45'; Motlhale 62'; Ngenda 71'; Selebatso 87'; Mathlo 90'	Report		Stadium: Lobatse Stadium; Referee: Mercy Mziya (Malawi)

19 March 2016 2016 AFWCON qualification First round 2nd leg	Mauritius	0–4 (0–11 agg.)	Botswana	Curepipe, Mauritius
		Report	Lesaane 27'; Tholakele 28', 74'; Ramafifi 68'	Stadium: Stade George V Referee: Nirinjanahary Raharijaona (Madagascar)
Note: Botswana won 11–0 on aggregate.

=== 2017 ===
14 September 2017 COSAFA Women's Championship GS Group B	Mauritius	0–3	Swaziland	Bulawayo, Zimbabwe
10:30		Report	Sanga 1'; Mdluli 32'; Nkambule 86'	Stadium: Luveve Stadium

16 September 2017 COSAFA Women's Championship GS Group B	Kenya	11–0	Mauritius	Bulawayo, Zimbabwe
10:30	Adam 9', 85'; Atieno 25', 32', 45+5', 51'; Mukhwana 34', 49'; Salano 54'; Nixon 79'; Rassoie 90+2' (o.g.)	Report		Stadium: Luveve Stadium

18 September 2017 COSAFA Women's Championship GS Group B	Mauritius	0–3	Mozambique	Bulawayo, Zimbabwe
14:00		Report	Lúcia Leila 19'; Ninika 49'; Betinha 54'	Stadium: Luveve Stadium

=== 2018 ===
13 December 2018 Friendly	Mauritius	0–5	Mayotte	Quatre Bornes, Mauritius
		Report

17 December 2018 2018 UFFOI Championship	Mauritius	0–3	Comoros	Quatre Bornes, Mauritius
		Report

=== 2019 ===
1 August 2019 COSAFA Women's Championship GS Group B	Zambia	15–0	Mauritius	KwaZakele, South Africa
12:45	Nachula 8', 27', 35', 53', 59', 68', 74', 85'; G. Chanda 19', 45+3'; Mwakapila 32'; H. Chanda 45'; Jérôme 71' (o.g.); Chileshe 79'; Chewe 84'	Report		Stadium: Wolfson Stadium

3 August 2019 COSAFA Women's Championship GS Group B	Mauritius	0–3	Botswana	KwaZakele, South Africa
12:45		Report	Galekhutle 21'; Mosotho 37'; Dithebe 77'	Stadium: Wolfson Stadium

6 August 2019 COSAFA Women's Championship GS Group B	Namibia	8–0	Mauritius	Port Elizabeth, South Africa
15:30	Coleman 3', 48', 74', 75'; Uueziua 24'; Shikusho 30'; Jossob 45'; Mulunga 88'	Report		Stadium: Gelvandale Stadium

=== 2022 ===
9 July 2022 2022 Mauritius Triangular	Mauritius	1–1	Seychelles	Quatre Bornes, Mauritius
17:00 UTC+4	Ramasawmy 30'		Esther 43'	Stadium: Cote d'Or National Sports Complex

31 August 2022 COSAFA Women's Championship Group A	Mauritius	0–5	Mozambique	Port Elizabeth, South Africa
12:00			Cuta 1', 20'; Tsanwane 29'; Gove 39'; Manuel 72'	Stadium: Madibaz Stadium

3 September 2022 COSAFA Women's Championship Group A	South Africa	4–0	Mauritius	Port Elizabeth, South Africa
15:30	Sam 33', 47'; Maseko 78'; Sampson 90'			Stadium: Madibaz Stadium

6 September 2022 COSAFA Women's Championship Group A	Mauritius	0–3	Angola	Port Elizabeth, South Africa
15:30			Sara Luvunga 10', 81'; Teresa Evaristo 72'	Stadium: Madibaz Stadium

=== 2023 ===
11 January 2023 2023 SAFF Women's Friendly Tournament	Saudi Arabia	1–0	Mauritius	Khobar, Saudi Arabia
20:30 UTC+3	Al-Tamimi 44' (pen.)	Report		Stadium: Prince Saud bin Jalawi Stadium; Referee: Shahenda Saad Ali ElMaghrabi (Egypt)

15 January 2023 2023 SAFF Women's Friendly Tournament	Mauritius	2–1	Pakistan	Khobar, Saudi Arabia
16:30 UTC+3	Jheemla 4'; Gopal 64'	Report	M. Khan 9'	Stadium: Prince Saud bin Jalawi Stadium; Referee: Edita Mirabidova (Uzbekistan)

19 January 2023 2023 SAFF Women's Friendly Tournament	Mauritius	1–2	Comoros	Khobar, Saudi Arabia
16:30 UTC+3	Verloppe 63'	Report	Hadhirami Ali 19', 31'	Stadium: Prince Saud bin Jalawi Stadium

21 September 2023 2024 AFWCON qualification First round 1st leg	Guinea	8–0	Mauritius	Conakry, Guinea
16:00 UTC+0	Kourouma 9', 75'; Fancinandouno 40', 66'; M. Camara 54'; Lamah 59'; A. Camara 77'; N. Camara 90'			Stadium: General Lansana Conté Stadium

26 September 2023 2024 AFWCON qualification First round 2nd leg	Mauritius	0–3 (0–11 agg.)	Guinea	Quatre Bornes, Mauritius
18:00 UTC+4		Report (FGF)	A. Camara 5', 38'; M. Camara 32'	Stadium: Cote d'Or National Sports Complex
Note: Guinea won 11–0 on aggregate.

5 December 2023 International Friendly	Mauritius	3–1	Seychelles	Saint Pierre, Mauritius
19:00 UTC+4	Ramasawmy 21'; Pierrot 56'; Lam kam cheung 64'	Report (MFA)	P. Moustache 46'	Stadium: Côte d'Or National Sports Complex

8 December 2023 International Friendly	Mauritius	1–1	Seychelles	Saint Pierre, Mauritius
19:00 UTC+4	Fourneau 17'	Report (MFA)	P. Moustache 89'	Stadium: Côte d'Or National Sports Complex

=== 2024 ===
23 October 2024 2024 COSAFA WC GS	Madagascar	5–1	Mauritius	Ibhayi, South Africa
14:00 UTC+2	Razananivo Mamonjy 6'; Rasoanandrasana 18', 37'; Randrianarivelo 45+2' (pen.); Nambininjanahary 89'	Report	Gopal 67'	Stadium: Isaac Wolfson Stadium; Referee: Gloria Sambumba (Zambia)

26 October 2024 2024 COSAFA WC GS	Botswana	5–0	Mauritius	Gqeberha, South Africa
12:00 UTC+2	Dithebe 5'; Ontlametse 45+4'; Modise 58', 60', 69' (pen.)	Report		Stadium: Madibaz Stadium; Referee: Tania Marisa Duarte (Angola)

28 October 2024 2024 COSAFA WC GS	Mauritius	0–9	Malawi	Gqeberha, South Africa
12:00 UTC+2		Report	Chinyamula 8', 51', 79'; Thom 23' (pen.), 70' (pen.), 83'; Simwaka 27'; Kachala 86'; Kenneth 90+13'	Stadium: Madibaz Stadium; Referee: Nteboheleng Setoko (Lesotho)

=== 2026 ===
4 June 2026 2028 Olympic Qualification First round	Mauritius	2–1	Djibouti	Saint Pierre
19:00 UTC+4	Clair 1'; Gopal 90+6' (pen.)	Report	Geremew 38'	Stadium: Côte d'Or National Sports Complex; Referee: Nonjabulo Nonhle Ndlela (South Africa)

8 June 2026 2028 Olympic Qualification First round	Djibouti	0–1 (1–3 agg.)	Mauritius	Saint Pierre, Mauritius
17:30 UTC+4		Report	Fourneau 75'	Stadium: Côte d'Or National Sports Complex

8 October 2026 2028 Olympic Qualification Second round	Mauritius	0–3	Ghana	Saint Pierre, Mauritius
18:30 UTC+4		Report	Kim 16'; Kusi 24'; Simon 45+3'	Stadium: Côte d'Or National Sports Complex; Referee: Sisay Raya (Ethiopia)

13 October 2026 2028 Olympic Qualification Second round	Ghana	7–0 (10–0 agg.)	Mauritius	Accra, Ghana
16:00 UTC+0	Badu 9'; Boakye 27'; Zakaria 32'; Abdulai 74', 90+3'; Cudjoe 87' (pen.); Amoh 89'	Report		Stadium: Accra Sports Stadium; Referee: Joselyne Nsabimana (Burundi)

== Unofficial matches ==
3 April 2011 Friendly	Mauritius	3–0	Rodrigues	Bambous, Mauritius
		Report

26 October 2014 Friendly	Mauritius	1–0	Rodrigues	Curepipe, Mauritius
		Report

21 December 2018 2018 UFFOI Championship	Mauritius	3–1	Rodrigues	Quatre Bornes, Mauritius
		Report

7 July 2022 2022 Mauritius Triangular	Mauritius	5–0	Rodrigues	Quatre Bornes, Mauritius
	Aliphon (??); Félicité (??); pierrot (??)	Report		Stadium: Cote d'Or National Sports Complex

25 October 2024 Friendly	Comoros	4–0	Mauritius	Gqeberha, South Africa
13:00 UTC+2	Hadhirami; Houmadi; Ahamada	Report
Note: Not an official friendly match; a practice game (less than 90 minutes) with no rules on substitutions or other regulations.

== See also ==
- Mauritius national football team results
