= South Africa women's national soccer team results =

This article lists the results and fixtures for the South Africa women's national soccer team.

The South Africa women's national football team, known by its official nickname, Banyana Banyana, represents South Africa in women's football. Governed by the South African Football Association (SAFA), the team competes as a member of the Confederation of African Football (CAF).

Their first international match outside of Africa was against China. They played two matches which they lost 8–0 and 13–0 with the latter being the heaviest defeat in their history. The team's first victory over a nation outside of Africa was in 2000, where they beat Scotland by 2–0. This was at the Cyrus Women's Cup.

They won the Women's Africa Cup of Nations once in 2022 and have participated in 14 editions of the tournament. The team has competed at two FIFA Women's World Cup's in 2019 and 2023.

== Results ==
=== 1994 ===
5 November 1995 African Women's Championship	South Africa	5–3	Zambia

20 November 1995 African Women's Championship	Zambia	2–6	South Africa

=== 1995 ===
7 January 1995 African Women's Championship	Angola	1–3	South Africa

21 January 1995 African Women's Championship	South Africa	3–3	Angola

4 March 1995 African Women's Championship	Nigeria	4–1	South Africa

18 March 1995 African Women's Championship	South Africa	1–7	Nigeria

=== 1998 ===
29 March 1998 African Women's Championship qualification	South Africa	9–0	Eswatini

11 April 1998 African Women's Championship qualification	Eswatini	0–6	South Africa

18 October 1998 African Women's Championship	Ghana	4–0	Nigeria

21 October 1998 African Women's Championship	Cameroon	3–2	South Africa

=== 2000 ===
11 November 2000 African Women's Championship	South Africa	3–0	Réunion	Boksburg, South Africa
	Phewa 33'; Ellis 55'; Malaku 69'			Referee: Bola Abidoye(Nigeria)

14 November 2000 African Women's Championship	South Africa	3–0	Uganda	Boksburg, South Africa
	Solomon 27'; Luthuli 32'; Lekalakala 51'			Referee: Scholastica Tetteh (Ghana)

17 November 2000 African Women's Championship	South Africa	2–1	Zimbabwe	Boksburg, South Africa
	Luthili 49'; Phewa 65'		Mpala 44'	Referee: Ondo Akono (Cameroon)

21 November 2000 African Women's Championship	South Africa	1–0	Ghana	Boksburg, South Africa
	Solomon 9'			Referee: Fatou Gaye (Senegal)

25 November 2000 African Women's Championship	Nigeria	2–0 ^{1}	South Africa	Boksburg, South Africa
	Yusuf 30'; Mbachu 72'			Referee: Ondo Akono (Cameroon)

=== 2002 ===
8 December 2002 African Women's Championship	South Africa	2–1	Cameroon	Oghara Township Stadium, Oghara
	Phewa 70'; Carelse 71'		Anounga 72'	Referee: Bola Abidoye (Nigeria)

11 December 2002 African Women's Championship	South Africa	1–1	Angola	Oghara Township Stadium, Oghara
	Monyepao 9'		Ramos 75'	Referee: Constance Adipo (Uganda)

14 December 2002 African Women's Championship	South Africa	3–1	Zimbabwe	Warri Township Stadium, Warri
	Phewa 27', 33', 61'		Talent 50'	Referee: Bola Abidoye (Nigeria)

18 December 2002 African Women's Championship	South Africa	0–5	Nigeria	Warri Township Stadium, Warri
			Yusuf 31'; Chiejine 47'; Mbachu 56', 81'; Nkwocha 69'	Referee: Chimane Nombauli (Congo)

20 December 2002 African Women's Championship	Cameroon	3–0	South Africa	Warri Township Stadium, Warri

=== 2004 ===
18 September 2004 African Women's Championship	South Africa	0–3	Ghana	Caledonian Stadium, Pretoria
		Report	Anokyewaa 36'; Foriwa 51'; Asante 89'

21 September 2004 African Women's Championship	Zimbabwe	2–1	South Africa	Caledonian Stadium, Pretoria
	Moyo 30'; Nyaumwe 50'	Report	Modise 4'

24 September 2004 African Women's Championship	South Africa	1–2	Ethiopia	Germiston Stadium, Germiston
	Phewa 24'	Report	Tutu 7'; Gebrekirstos 45'

=== 2006 ===
28 October 2006 African Women's Championship	South Africa	4–0	Algeria	Warri Stadium, Warri
	Phewa 1', 35'; Nompumelolo 38'; Solomon 90'	Report (BBC)

31 October 2006 African Women's Championship	Equatorial Guinea	0–2	South Africa	Oleh, Delta
		Report (archived)	Nkosi 63'; Solomon 75'

3 November 2006 African Women's Championship	Nigeria	2–0	South Africa	Oleh, Delta
	Uwak 4', 43'	Report (BBC)

7 November 2006 African Women's Championship	Ghana	1–0	South Africa	Township Stadium, Oghara
	Okoe 88' (pen.)	Report (archived)

10 November 2006 African Women's Championship	Cameroon	2–2 (4–5 p)	South Africa	Ughelli Township Stadium Oleh, Delta
	Bella 48' (pen.); Ngono 81'	Report (archived)	Modise 4'; Makhanya 61'

=== 2008 ===
16 November 2008 African Women's Championship	South Africa	2–1	Tunisia	Estadio La Libertad, Bata
15:30	Matlou; H. Ngwane		Guedri

19 November 2008 African Women's Championship	Ghana	0–1	South Africa	Estadio La Libertad, Bata
13:00			24' V. Phewa

22 November 2008 African Women's Championship	Nigeria	1–0	South Africa	Estadio La Libertad, Bata
15:00	Chiejine 16'

25 November 2008 African Women's Championship	South Africa	3–0	Cameroon	Estadio Internacional, Malabo
17:00	Matlou 28' 47' 80'

29 November 2008 African Women's Championship	Equatorial Guinea	2–1	South Africa	Estadio Internacional, Malabo
15:00	Diala 22'; Añonman 68'		Matlou 35'

=== 2010 ===
31 October 2010 African Women's Championship	South Africa	2–1	Tanzania	Sinaba Stadium, Daveyton
13:00	Popela 35'; Mamello 87' (pen.)	Report	Chabruma 43'	Referee: Therese Neguel (Cameroon)

4 November 2010 African Women's Championship	South Africa	1–2	Nigeria	Sinaba Stadium, Daveyton
11:00	van Wyk 44'	Report	Nkwocha 33', 39'	Referee: Fadouma Dia (Senegal)

7 November 2010 African Women's Championship	Mali	0–4	South Africa	Sinaba Stadium, Daveyton
15:30		Report	Amanda 32', 76', 90'; Jermaine 84'	Referee: Fadouma Dia (Senegal)

11 November 2010 African Women's Championship	Equatorial Guinea	3 – 1 (a.e.t.)	South Africa	Sinaba Stadium, Daveyton
15:30	S. Simporé 103', 120+5'; Jade 109'	Report	Dlamini 120+8'	Referee: Aisatta Ameyo Amegee (Togo)

14 November 2010 African Women's Championship	Cameroon	0–2	South Africa	Sinaba Stadium, Daveyton
10:00		Report	Skiti 8'; Dlamini 38'	Referee: Pamela Chiwaya (Zimbabwe)

=== 2011 ===
2 July 2011 COSAFA Women's Championship	South Africa	4–1	Zambia	Gwanzura, Harare

3 July 2011 COSAFA Women's Championship	Botswana	0–4	South Africa	Gwanzura, Harare
		Report	Dlamini 16'; Matlou 46'; Makhabane 70'; Sukazi 90'

5 July 2011 COSAFA Women's Championship	South Africa	1–0	Tanzania	Gwanzura, Harare
	Sukazi 60'	Report

6 July 2011 COSAFA Women's Championship	South Africa	5–1	Malawi	Harare
	Vilakazi 21'; Dlamini 24', 66'; Bafta 85'; Matlou 89' (pen.)		Chawinga 17'

8 July 2011 COSAFA Women's Championship	Zimbabwe	1–0	South Africa	Harare
	Machingara 84'

=== 2012 ===
28 October 2012 African Women's Championship	Equatorial Guinea	1–0	South Africa	Estadio de Malabo, Malabo
14:30	Chinasa 33'	Report		Referee: Therese Sagno (Guinea)

31 October 2012 African Women's Championship	South Africa	1–0	Senegal	Estadio de Malabo, Malabo
14:30	Mgcoyi 70'	Report		Referee: Lidya Tafese (Ethiopia)

3 November 2012 African Women's Championship	South Africa	4–1	DR Congo	Nkoantoma Stadium, Bata
17:30	Smeda 3'; Mgcoyi 10', 48', 57'	Report	Tuzolana 88'	Referee: Gladys Lingwe (Zambia)

7 November 2012 African Women's Championship	Nigeria	0–1	South Africa	Nkoantoma Stadium, Bata
17:30		Report	van Wyk 23'

11 November 2012 African Women's Championship	Equatorial Guinea	4–0	South Africa	Estadio de Malabo, Malabo
17:30	Chinasa 43', 72'; Tiga 66'; Añonman 70'	Report		Attendance: 20 000

=== 2014 ===
12 October 2014 African Women's Championship	South Africa	0–1	Cameroon	Independence Stadium, Windhoek
17:00		Report	Feudjio 86'	Referee: Gladys Lengwe (Zambia)

15 October 2014 African Women's Championship	Ghana	1–1	South Africa	Independence Stadium, Windhoek
20:00	Cudjoe 45'	Report	Nongwanya 19'	Referee: Ledia Tafesa (Ethiopia)

18 October 2014 African Women's Championship	South Africa	5–1	Algeria	Independence Stadium, Windhoek
17:00	Dlamini 36'; Modise 41', 87'; Mollo 70'; Makhabane 82'	Report	Affak 90'	Referee: Aisha Ssemambo (Uganda)

22 October 2014 African Women's Championship	Nigeria	2–1	South Africa	Sam Nujoma Stadium, Windhoek
17:00	Oshoala 38', 45'	Report	Jane 67'	Referee: Damaris Kimani (Kenya)

25 October 2014 African Women's Championship	South Africa	0–1	Ivory Coast	Sam Nujoma Stadium, Windhoek
17:00		Report	Guehai 84'	Referee: Lilia Abdeljaoued (Tunisia)

=== 2016 ===
19 November 2016 Women's Africa Cup of Nations	South Africa	0–0	Zimbabwe	Stade Ahmadou Ahidjo, Yaoundé
18:30		Report		Referee: Caroline Wanjala (Kenya)

22 November 2016 Women's Africa Cup of Nations	Cameroon	1–0	South Africa	Stade Ahmadou Ahidjo, Yaoundé
16:00	Ngo 83'	Report		Referee: Aissata Ameyo Amegee (Togo)

25 November 2016 Women's Africa Cup of Nations	Egypt	0–5	South Africa	Stade Municipal de Limbe, Limbe
16:00		Report	Mgcoyi 27'; Vilakazi 60'; Jane 61'; Seoposenwe 66'; Motlhalo 84'	Referee: Salima Mukansanga (Rwanda)

29 November 2016 Women's Africa Cup of Nations	Nigeria	1–0	South Africa	Limbe Stadium, Limbe
19:00	Oparanozie 54'	Report		Referee: Lidya Tafesse (Ethiopia)

2 December 2016 Women's Africa Cup of Nations	Ghana	1–0	South Africa	Ahmadou Ahidjo Stadium, Yaoundé
15:30	Eshun 48'	Report		Referee: Jonesia Rukyaa Kabakama (Tanzania)

=== 2017 ===
14 September 2017 COSAFA Women's Championship	South Africa	3–0	Lesotho	Luveve Stadium
16:30	Smeda 28'; Esau 67'; Kgatlana 73'	Report

15 September 2017 COSAFA Women's Championship	South Africa	3–1	Namibia	Barbourfields Stadium
16:30	Kgatlana 5', 88'; Esau 13'	Report	Blou 37'

17 September 2017 COSAFA Women's Championship	South Africa	1–1	Botswana	Luveve Stadium
16:30	Esau 87'	Report	Tholakele 84'

21 September 2017 COSAFA Women's Championship	Zambia	3–3 (3–5 p)	South Africa	Barbourfields Stadium
13:00	Banda 21'; Chanda 45'; M. Zulu 73'	Report	Smeda 77', 78' (pen.); Jane 84'
	Penalties
	M. Zulu (penalty scored); G. Zulu (penalty scored); Chisamu (penalty scored); Mukwasa (penalty missed)		(penalty scored) Smeda; (penalty scored) Mbane; (penalty scored) Matlou; (penalty scored) Nyandeni; (penalty scored) Ramalepe

24 September 2017 COSAFA Women's Championship	South Africa	2–1	Zimbabwe	Barbourfields Stadium
15:00	Kgatlana 45+1'; Smeda 90'	Report	Makore 73'

=== 2018 ===
12 September 2018 COSAFA Women's Championship	South Africa	2–1	Madagascar	Wolfson Stadium, KwaZakele
15:30	Xesi 7'; Vilakazi 20'	Report	Rasoanandrasana 22' (pen.)

14 September 2018 COSAFA Women's Championship	Botswana	0–1	South Africa	Wolfson Stadium, KwaZakele
15:30		Report	Seoposenwe 90+5'

17 September 2018 COSAFA Women's Championship	South Africa	6–0	Malawi	Wolfson Stadium, KwaZakele
15:30	Motlhalo 10', 88', 89'; Xesi 31', 45'; Mohlakoana 53'	Report

20 September 2018 COSAFA Women's Championship	South Africa	2–0	Uganda	Wolfson Stadium, KwaZakele
15:30	Motlhalo 7'; Seoposenwe 67'	Report

22 September 2018 COSAFA Women's Championship	Cameroon	1–2	South Africa	Wolfson Stadium, KwaZakele
12:00	Ngo 66'	Report	Jane 42', 90'

18 November 2018 Women's Africa Cup of Nations Group B	Nigeria	0–1	South Africa	Cape Coast Sports Stadium, Cape Coast
15:30		Report	Kgatlana 85'	Referee: Gladys Lengwe (Zambia)

21 November 2018 Women's Africa Cup of Nations Group B	Equatorial Guinea	1–7	South Africa	Cape Coast Sports Stadium, Cape Coast
18:30	E. Obono 45+1'	Report	Motlhalo 19' (pen.); Nyandeni 21'; Jane 56'; Kgatlana 60', 63'; Mthandi 76'; Seoposenwe 79'	Referee: Dorsaf Ganouati (Tunisia)

24 November 2018 Women's Africa Cup of Nations Group B	South Africa	1–1	Zambia	Accra Sports Stadium, Accra
16:00	Kgatlana 8'	Report	Kundananji 10'	Referee: Carolyne Wanjala (Kenya)

27 November 2018 Women's Africa Cup of Nations Semi-final	South Africa	2–0	Mali	Cape Coast Sports Stadium, Cape Coast
18:30	Kgatlana 31'; Ramalepe 81'	Report		Referee: Jonesia Rukyaa Kabakama (Tanzania)

1 December 2018 Women's Africa Cup of Nations Final	Nigeria	0–0 (a.e.t.) (4–3 p)	South Africa	Accra Sports Stadium, Accra
16:00		Report		Referee: Gladys Lengwe (Zambia)
	Penalties
	Ebi (penalty missed); Ebere (penalty scored); Chikwelu (penalty scored); Ihezuo (penalty scored); Uchendu (penalty scored)		(penalty scored) Matlou; (penalty missed) Ramalepe; (penalty scored) Nyandeni; (penalty scored) Makhabane; (penalty missed) Motlhalo

=== 2019 ===
31 July 2019 COSAFA Women's Championship	South Africa	17–0	Comoros	Wolfson Stadium, KwaZakele
15:30	Makhubela 16'; Fulutudilu 20'; Melanie 21' (o.g.); Makhabane 23'; Jane 38', 53', 79', 89'; Ndimeni 44'; Mbane 47', 63'; Mthandi 71', 78', 83'; Magaia 76', 81'; Biyana 81'	Report

2 August 2019 COSAFA Women's Championship	South Africa	3–1	Malawi	Wolfson Stadium, KwaZakele
15:30	Ramalepe 36'; Cesane 68'; Mthandi 85'	Report	Simwaka 4'

5 August 2019 COSAFA Women's Championship	South Africa	3–0	Madagascar	Wolfson Stadium, KwaZakele
12:45	Fulutudilu 9'; Jane 38'; Razafimanantsoa 77' (o.g.)	Report

8 August 2019 COSAFA Women's Championship	South Africa	3–1	Zimbabwe	Wolfson Stadium, KwaZakele
15:30	Mbane 18'; Mthandi 45+2'; Ndimeni 81'	Report	Chirandu 21'

11 August 2019 COSAFA Women's Championship	Zambia	0–1	South Africa	Wolfson Stadium, KwaZakele
15:00		Report	Makhubela 22'

=== 2020 ===
3 November 2020 COSAFA Women's Championship	South Africa	2–0	Angola	Wolfson Stadium, Ibhayi
15:30	Mhlongo 40'; Dhlamini 61'	Report

6 November 2020 COSAFA Women's Championship	Eswatini	0–5	South Africa	Wolfson Stadium, Ibhayi
15:30		Report	Kgoale 3', 60'; Holweni 37'; Salgado 47', 90'

9 November 2020 COSAFA Women's Championship	South Africa	7–0	Comoros	Wolfson Stadium, Ibhayi
15:30	Holweni 8', 31', 49', 88', 90+2'; Magaia 42'; Mthandi 51'	Report

12 November 2020 COSAFA Women's Championship	South Africa	6–2	Malawi	Wolfson Stadium, Ibhayi
15:30	Kgoale 51', 64'; Magaia 62', 68', 75'; Holweni 74'	Report	Te. Chawinga 53'; Ta. Chawinga 78'

14 November 2020 COSAFA Women's Championship	Botswana	1–2	South Africa	Wolfson Stadium, Ibhayi
15:00	Thanda 85'	Report	Holweni 2'; Salgado 66'

=== 2021 ===
28 September 2021 COSAFA Women's Championship	South Africa	2–1	Malawi	Port Elizabeth
15:30	Kgadiete 3'; Cesane 37'	Report	Mvula 90'	Stadium: Wolfson Stadium

1 October 2021 COSAFA Women's Championship	South Africa	0–0	Angola	Port Elizabeth
15:30		Report		Stadium: Gelvandale Stadium

4 October 2021 COSAFA Women's Championship	South Africa	3–1	Mozambique	Port Elizabeth
15:30	Holweni 24', 77'; Kgadiete 66'	Report	Cina 64'	Stadium: Wolfson Stadium

7 October 2021 COSAFA Women's Championship	South Africa	2–3	Malawi	Port Elizabeth
15:30	Holweni 45', 81' (pen.)	Report	Chiyembekezo 38'; Thom 74', 86'	Stadium: Wolfson Stadium

9 October 2021 COSAFA Women's Championship	Zambia	1–1 (4–3 p)	South Africa	Port Elizabeth
12:00	Ochumba 20'	Report	Holweni 76'	Stadium: Wolfson Stadium; Referee: Mercy Kayria (Malawi)
	Penalties
	Mweemba (penalty scored); Lampi (penalty missed); Mukwasa (penalty scored); Ochumba (penalty scored); Limwanya (penalty scored)		(penalty scored) van Wyk; (penalty missed) Faya; (penalty scored) Salgado; (penalty scored) Mokwena; (penalty missed) Holweni

=== 2022 ===
12 April Friendly	Netherlands	5–1	South Africa	's-Gravenhage
	Groenen 12'; Beerensteyn 30'; Miedema 39'; Egurrola 76', 90+1'	Report	Kgatlana 25'	Stadium: Cars Jeans Stadion; Referee: María Dolores Martínez

4 July 2022 2022 AFWCON GS	Nigeria	1–2	South Africa	Rabat, Maroc
18:00	Ajibade 90+2'		Seoposenwe 61'; Magaia 63'	Stadium: Stade Moulay Hassan; Referee: Bouchra Karboubi (Morocco)

7 July 2022 2022 AFWCON GS	South Africa	3–1	Burundi	Rabat, Maroc
18:00	Kgatlana 20'; Motau 32'; Motlhalo 54' (pen.)		Uwimana 30'	Stadium: Stade Moulay Hassan; Referee: Shahenda El-Maghrabi (Egypt)

10 July 2022 2022 AFWCON GS	South Africa	1–0	Botswana	Rabat, Maroc
21:00				Stadium: Prince Moulay Abdellah Stadium

14 July 2022 2022 AFWCON QF	South Africa	1–0	Tunisia	Rabat, Morocco
21:00	Seoposenwe 14'	Report (FIFA)		Stadium: Stade Moulay Hassan; Referee: Salima Mukansanga (Rwanda)

18 July 2022 2022 AFWCON SF	Zambia	0–1	South Africa	Casablanca, Morocco
			Motlhalo 90+4' (pen.)	Stadium: Stade Mohammed V Referee: Lidya Tafesse (Ethiopia)

22 July 2022 2022 AFWCON F	Morocco	1–2	South Africa	Rabat, Morocco
21:00	Ayane 80'		Magaia 63', 71'	Stadium: Prince Moulay Abdellah Stadium

31 August 2022 COSAFA Women's Championship Group A	South Africa	3–0	Angola	Gqeberha
15:30	Maseko 21'; Shamase 35'; Sam 89'			Stadium: Nelson Mandela Bay Stadium

2 September Friendly	South Africa	0–3	Brazil	Soweto, South Africa
18:00			Geyse 43'; Adriana 45'; Tamires 63'	Stadium: Orlando Stadium; Referee: Maria Rivet (Mauritania)

3 September 2022 COSAFA Women's Championship Group A	South Africa	4–0	Mauritius	Port Elizabeth
15:30	Sam 33', 47'; Maseko 78'; Sampson 90'			Stadium: Madibaz Stadium

5 September Friendly	South Africa	0–6	Brazil	South Africa

6 September 2022 COSAFA Women's Championship Group A	Mozambique	1–1	South Africa	Wolfson Stadium, Gqeberha
15:30	Cuta 28'		Shamase 53'

9 September 2022 COSAFA Women's Championship SF	Namibia	0–1	South Africa	Wolfson Stadium, Gqeberha
15:00			Sam 82'

11 September 2022 COSAFA Women's Championship Final	Zambia	1-0	South Africa	Wolfson Stadium, Gqeberha
15:00	Banda (??)

8 October 2022 Friendly	Australia	4–1	South Africa	London, United Kingdom
12:30 UTC+0	Vine 5', 24'; Polkinghorne 42'; Foord 53'	Report	Magaia 87'	Stadium: Kingsmeadow

=== 2023 ===
15 February Turkish Women's Cup	South Africa	v	Turkey	Alanya, Turkey
				Stadium: Miracle Sport Complex

18 February Turkish Women's Cup	South Africa	3–0	Uzbekistan	Alanya, Turkey
	Seoposenwe 10'; Tojiddinova 13' (o.g.); Cesane 25'			Stadium: Goldcity Sport Complex

21 February Turkish Women's Cup	South Africa	1–1	Slovenia	Alanya, Turkey
	Magaia 73'	Report	Mori 13'	Stadium: Goldcity Sport Complex

10 April Friendly	South Africa	2–3	Serbia	Stara Pazova, Serbia
13:30	Magaia 30; Seoposenwe 79	Report	Slović 9; Mijatović 17; Poljak 21	Stadium: Sportski Centar FSS

2 July Friendly	South Africa	0–5	Botswana	Brakpan, South Africa
15:00 UTC+2			Gaonyadiwe 5', 13'; Dithebe 24'; Tholakele 27', 79'	Stadium: Tsakane Stadium; Referee: Vistoria Shangula (Namibia)

15 July Friendly	South Africa	2–0	Costa Rica	Christchurch, New Zealand
	Thembi Kgatlana 33'; Hildah Magaia 55'			Stadium: Ngā Puna Wai Sports Hub

23 July FIFA WC Group	Sweden	2–1	South Africa	Wellington, New Zealand
17:00 UTC+12	Rolfö 65'; Ilestedt 90'	Report	Magaia 48'	Stadium: Wellington Regional Stadium; Attendance: 18,317; Referee: Ekaterina Koroleva (United States)

28 July FIFA WC Group	Argentina	2–2	South Africa	Dunedin, New Zealand
	Braun 74'; Núñez 79'	Report	Motlhalo 30'; Kgatlana 66'	Stadium: Forsyth Barr Stadium; Attendance: 8,834; Referee: Anna-Marie Keighley (New Zealand)

2 August FIFA WC Group	South Africa	3–2	Italy	Wellington, New Zealand
	Orsi 32' (o.g.); Magaia 67'; Kgatlana 90+2'	Report	Caruso 11' (pen.), 74'	Stadium: Wellington Regional Stadium; Attendance: 14,967; Referee: María Carvajal (Chile)

6 August FIFA WC R16	Netherlands	2–0	South Africa	Sydney, Australia
	Roord 9'; Beerensteyn 68'	Report		Stadium: Sydney Football Stadium; Attendance: 40,233; Referee: Yoshimi Yamashita (Japan)

21 September 2023 Friendly	United States	3–0	South Africa	Cincinnati, Ohio
19:30 ET	Williams 32', 40'; Rodman 34'			Stadium: TQL Stadium; Attendance: 22,016; Referee: Katia Garcia (Mexico)

24 September 2023 Friendly	United States	2–0	South Africa	Chicago, Illinois
17:30 ET	Rodman 18'; Sonnett 49'	Report		Stadium: Soldier Field; Attendance: 25,622; Referee: Carly Shaw-MacLaren (Canada)

4 October 2023 2023 COSAFA WC GS	South Africa	3–4	Malawi	Pretoria, South Africa
12:00 UTC+2	T. Shamase 44'; Nkuna 79'; S. Shamase 90+3'	Report	Chinyamula 27'; Te. Chawinga 45+5', 64', 76'	Stadium: Lucas Moripe Stadium; Referee: Antsino Twanyanyukwa (Namibia)

10 October 2023 2023 COSAFA WC GS	South Africa	3–1	Madagascar	Johannesburg, South Africa
15:30 UTC+2	T. Shamase 14' (pen.); Selana 65', 78'		Velomanantsolo 43'	Stadium: Dobsonville Stadium; Referee: Vistoria Shangula (Namibia)

10 October 2023 2023 COSAFA WC GS	Eswatini	0–3	South Africa	Johannesburg, South Africa
15:30 UTC+2		Report	T. Shamase 6', 12', 55'	Stadium: Dobsonville Stadium; Referee: Rosalie Rosalie (Madagascar)

25 October 2023 2024 Olympic qualifying	DR Congo	1–1	South Africa	Kinshasa, DR Congo
15:30 UTC+1	Mfwamba 40'	Report	Kgatlana 48'	Stadium: Stade des Martyrs

30 October 2024 Olympic qualifying	South Africa	2–0 (3–1 agg.)	DR Congo	Pretoria, South Africa
				Stadium: Lucas Moripe Stadium
Note: South Africa won 3–1 on aggregate

30 November 2023 2024 AFWCON qualification Second round 1st leg	Burkina Faso	1–1	South Africa	Yamoussoukro, Ivory Coast
17:00 UTC+1	Konaté 68'	Report (SAFA)	Magaia 60'	Stadium: Charles Konan Banny Stadium

4 December 2023 2024 AFWCON qualification Second round 2nd leg	South Africa	2–0 (3–1 agg.)	Burkina Faso	Pretoria, South Africa
15:00 UTC+1		Report (SAFA)		Stadium: Lucas Moripe Stadium
Note: South Africa won 3–1 on aggregate.

=== 2024 ===
23 February 2024 2024 Olympic qualifying	Tanzania	0–3	South Africa	Dar es Salaam,Tanzania
			Seoposenwe 10'; Kgatlana 58'; Magaia 86'	Stadium: Azam Complex Stadium

27 February 2024 2024 Olympic qualifying	South Africa	1–0 (4–0 agg.)	Tanzania	Mbombela,South Africa
	Kgatlana 58'			Stadium: Mbombela Stadium
Note: South Africa won 4–0 on aggregate.

5 April 2024 2024 Olympic qualifying	Nigeria	1–0	South Africa	Abuja,Nigeria
17:00 UTC+1		Report		Stadium: MKO Abiola Stadium; Referee: Ghada Mehat (Algeria)

9 April 2024 2024 Olympic qualifying	South Africa	0–0 (0–1 agg.)	Nigeria	Pretoria ,South Africa
19:30 UTC+2		Report	Ajibade 43' (pen.)	Stadium: Loftus Versfeld Stadium; Referee: Dorsaf Ganouati (Tunisia)
Note: Nigeria won 1–0 on aggregate.

22 October 2024 2024 COSAFA WC GS	South Africa	1–0	Namibia	Gqeberha, South Africa
17:00 UTC+2	Motlogelwa 84'	Report		Stadium: Nelson Mandela Bay Stadium; Referee: Thanks Nyahuye (Zimbabwe)

25 October 2024 2024 COSAFA WC GS	South Africa	3–0	Eswatini	Ibhayi, South Africa
15:00 UTC+2	Mdelwa 41'; Williams 55'; Moosa 87'	Report		Stadium: Isaac Wolfson Stadium; Referee: Antsino Twanyanyukwa (Namibia)

25 October Friendly	Denmark	5–0	South Africa	Aalborg, Denmark
18:00 UTC+1	Obaze 51'; Bruun 55', 57'; Vangsgaard 64'; Kühl 75'			Stadium: Aalborg Stadium

28 October 2024 2024 COSAFA WC GS	South Africa	8–1	Seychelles	Gqeberha, South Africa
15:00 UTC+2	Hendricks 11', 26', 51'; Phahla 24'; Motlogelwa 44'; Mkhwanazi 45+6', 56'; Moosa 52'	Report	Pas. Moustache 74' (pen.)	Stadium: Madibaz Stadium; Referee: Grace Gimo (Zimbabwe)

29 October Friendly	England	2–1	South Africa	Coventry, England
				Stadium: Coventry Arena

31 October 2024 2024 COSAFA WC SF	South Africa	1–1 (4–1 p)	Mozambique	Ibhayi, South Africa
15:00 UTC+2	Motlogelwa 45+4' (pen.)	Report	Célia 34'	Stadium: Isaac Wolfson Stadium; Referee: Mercy Mayimbo (Zimbabwe)
	Penalties
	Ludwig (penalty scored); Motlogelwa (penalty scored); Mdelwa (penalty scored); Hendricks (penalty scored)		(penalty missed) Chingueleze; (penalty scored) Joana; (penalty missed) Aurora

2 November 2024 2024 COSAFA WC F	Zambia	0–0 (a.e.t.) (4–3 p)	South Africa	Ibhayi, South Africa
15:00 UTC+2		Report		Stadium: Isaac Wolfson Stadium; Referee: Antsino Twanyanyukwa (Namibia)
	Penalties
	Namasiku (penalty scored); Chomba (penalty scored); Musole (penalty scored); Mulenga (penalty scored)		(penalty scored) Ludwig; (penalty missed) Pila; (penalty scored) Mdelwa; (penalty scored) Hendricks; (penalty missed) Hadebe

29 November Friendly	Jamaica	3-0	South Africa	Montego Bay, Jamaica
	Wilson 28'; Shaw 55', 82'

2 December Friendly	Jamaica	3-2	South Africa	Montego Bay, Jamaica
	Sampson 58'; Spence 63'; McKenna 76'		Motlhalo 19'; Motau 90'

=== 2025 ===
22 February Friendly	South Africa	1–0	Lesotho	Johannesburg, South Africa
13:00 UTC+2	Mdelwa 50'	Report		Stadium: UJ Soweto Campus

25 February Friendly	South Africa	2–0	Lesotho	Johannesburg, South Africa
15:00 UTC+2	Ntoane 4'; Simayile 45'	Report		Stadium: UJ Soweto Campus

5 April Friendly	South Africa	3–0	Malawi	Johannesburg, South Africa
15:00 UTC+2	Mthandi 13', 53'; Motlhalo 22'	Report		Stadium: UJ Soweto Campus

8 April Friendly	South Africa	2–1	Malawi	Pretoria, South Africa
15:00 UTC+2	Magaia 74'; Motau 88'	Report	Chikupira 58'	Stadium: Lucas Moripe Stadium

28 May Nations Challenge	South Africa	3–2	Botswana	Pretoria, South Africa
15:00 UTC+2	Mibe 13'; Seoposenwe 16', 36'	Report	Radiakanyo 41'; Moloi 63'	Stadium: Lucas Moripe Stadium; Player of the Match: Karabo Dhlamini (South Africa)

3 June Nations Challenge	South Africa	2–0	Zambia	Pretoria, South Africa
15:00 UTC+2	Gamede 74'; Seoposenwe 82'	Report		Stadium: Lucas Moripe Stadium; Referee: Vistoria Shangula (Namibia)

28 June Unofficial Friendly	South Africa	2–0	Benin	Mohammedia, Morocco
15:30 UTC+1				Stadium: Lanoria Club

7 July CAF WAFCON 2024 GS	South Africa	2–0	Ghana	Oujda, Morocco
17:00	Motlhalo 28' (pen.); Seoposenwe 34'	Report		Stadium: Honneur Stadium; Referee: Bouchra Karboubi (Morocco)

11 July CAF WAFCON 2024 GS	Tanzania	1−1	South Africa	Oujda, Morocco
20:00 UTC+1	Clement 24'; Katunzi (yellow card) 72'; Chenge (yellow card) 75' (yellow-red card) 84'		Mbane (yellow card) 19'; Cesane (yellow card) 24'; Mbane 70'	Stadium: Larbi Zaouli Stadium; Referee: Natacha Konan (Ivory Coast)

14 July CAF WAFCON 2024 GS	South Africa	4−0	Mali	Oujda, Morocco
20:00	Ramalepe 5'; Jane 35'; Magaia 61'; Donnelly 79'	Report		Stadium: Honneur Stadium; Referee: Bouchra Karboubi (Morocco)

19 July CAF WAFCON 2024 QF	South Africa	0−0 (a.e.t.) (4–1 p)	Senegal	Oujda, Morocco
21:00		Report		Stadium: Honneur Stadium; Referee: Shahenda El Maghrabi (Egypt)
	Penalties
	Dhlamini (penalty scored); Makhubela (penalty scored); Salgado (penalty scored); Mbane (penalty scored)		(penalty scored) Diop; (penalty missed) N. Ndiaye; (penalty missed) Kandé

22 July CAF WAFCON 2024 SF	Nigeria	2–1	South Africa	Casablanca, Morocco
18:00	Ajibade 45' (pen.); Alozie 90+4'	Report	Motlhalo 60'	Stadium: Larbi Zaouli Stadium; Referee: Shamirah Nabadda (Uganda)

25 July CAF WAFCON 2024 3rd	Ghana	1–1 (4–3 p)	South Africa	Casablanca, Morocco
21:00	Dlamini 68' (o.g.)	Report	Mthandi 45'	Stadium: Larbi Zaouli Stadium; Referee: Shahenda El Maghrabi (Egypt)
	Penalties
	Chantelle (penalty missed); Kusi (penalty scored); Bonsu (penalty scored); Cudjoe (penalty scored); Amoh (penalty scored)		(penalty scored) Motlhalo; (penalty scored) Mbane; (penalty missed) Holweni; (penalty missed) Magaia; (penalty scored) Seoposenwe

22 October WAFCON 2026 Q	DR Congo	1–1	South Africa	Kinshasa, DR Congo
17:00	Kipoyi 45+1'		Mohlakoana 42'	Stadium: Stade des Martyrs

28 October WAFCON 2026 Q	South Africa	1–0	DR Congo	Johannesburg, South Africa
19:00	Kgatlana 90+1'			Stadium: Dobsonville Stadium

30 November Friendly	Morocco	0–2	South Africa	Rabat, Morocco
			Mthandi 70'; Cesane 86'	Stadium: Stade Prince Moulay Abdallah

=== 2026 ===
18 February 2025 COSAFA Women's Championship	South Africa	2–0	Malawi	Polokwane, South Africa
15:00	Holweni 63'; Mokoma 90+1'	Report		Stadium: Old Peter Mokaba Stadium; Referee: Anna Banda (Zambia)

21 February 2025 COSAFA Women's Championship	South Africa	2–0	Angola	Seshego, South Africa
12:30	Salgado 12'; Mthandi 78'	Report		Stadium: Seshego Stadium; Referee: Grace Gimo (Zimbabwe)

24 February 2025 COSAFA Women's Championship	South Africa	1–1	Lesotho	Seshego, South Africa
15:00	Mphelo 39'	Report	Moalosi 30'	Stadium: Seshego Stadium; Referee: Élodie Livaharivony (Madagascar)

27 February 2025 COSAFA Women's Championship	South Africa	1–1 (4–2 p)	Zimbabwe	Polokwane, South Africa
15:00	Majiya 39'	Report	Chinyerere 11'	Stadium: New Peter Mokaba Stadium; Referee: Mathapelo Morake (Lesotho)
	Penalties
	Majiya (penalty scored); Mokoma (penalty scored); Pila (penalty scored); October (penalty scored)		(penalty scored) Chinyerere; (penalty scored) Kondo; (penalty missed) Sipini; (penalty missed) Ndlovu

1 March 2025 COSAFA Women's Championship	Namibia	2–1 (a.e.t.)	South Africa	Polokwane, South Africa
15:00	Hanavi 54'; Ngonda 92'	Report	Majiya 37'	Stadium: New Peter Mokaba Stadium; Referee: Rose Zimba (Malawi)

14 April Friendly	South Africa	1–0	Algeria	Durban, South Africa
15:00 UTC+2	Majiya 35'	Report (SAFA); Report (FAF)		Stadium: Princess Magogo Stadium; Referee: Vistoria Shangula (Namibia)

17 April Friendly	South Africa	2–0	Algeria	Durban, South Africa
15:00 UTC+2	Majiya 58'; O'Malley 86'	Report (SAFA); Report (FAF)		Stadium: King Zwelithini Stadium; Referee: Seonyatseng Tshephe (Botswana)

6 June Friendly	Japan	5–0	South Africa	Osaka, Japan
15:50 UTC+9	Seike 1', 19'; Tanikawa 29'; Fujino 49', 60'	Report		Stadium: Yodoko Sakura Stadium

9 June Friendly	Japan	0–1	South Africa	Osaka, Japan
15:30 UTC+9			Motlhalo 9'	Stadium: Natural Grass Main Field S1

27 July 2026 Women's Africa Cup of Nations	South Africa	1–2	Tanzania	Casablanca, Morocco
	Mbane 45+2'	Report (FIFA)	Msewa 37'; Ubamba 87'	Stadium: Stade Moulay Rachid

31 July 2026 Women's Africa Cup of Nations	South Africa	2–2	Ivory Coast	Casablanca, Morocco
	Kgatlana 71'; Ubamba 90+9'	Report (FIFA)	Sery 18'; Sery 36'	Stadium: Stade Moulay Rachid

4 August 2026 Women's Africa Cup of Nations	Burkina Faso	0–1	South Africa	Casablanca, Morocco
		Report (FIFA)	Kgatlana 21'	Stadium: Stade Moulay Rachid

8 August 2026 WAFCON QF	Morocco	2–1	South Africa	Rabat, Morocco
21:00 UTC+0	Ouzraoui 31'; Aït El Haj 51' (pen.)	Report (FIFA)	Kgatlana 67'	Stadium: Moulay El Hassan Stadium; Referee: Josephine Wanjiku (Kenya)

13 August 2026 2026 WAFCON Play-in matches	South Africa	v	Nigeria	Casablanca, Morocco
21:00		Report (FIFA)		Stadium: Moulay Rachid Stadium
