= 2019 COSAFA Women's Championship =

Tournament details
- Host country: South Africa
- City: Nelson Mandela Bay Metropolitan Municipality
- Dates: 31 July – 11 August 2019
- Teams: 12 (from 1 confederation)
- Venues: 2 (in 1 host city)

Final positions
- Champions: South Africa (6th title)
- Runners-up: Zambia
- Third place: Zimbabwe
- Fourth place: Botswana

Tournament statistics
- Matches played: 22
- Goals scored: 117 (5.32 per match)
- Top scorer(s): (Zambia) Racheal Nachula (10 goals)
- Best player: (Zambia) Hellen Mubanga
- Best goalkeeper: (South Africa) Andile Dlamini

The 2019 COSAFA Women's Championship was the seventh edition of the COSAFA Women's Championship, a women's international football tournament for national teams organised by COSAFA, teams from Southern Africa. It took place from 31 July to 11 August in the Nelson Mandela Bay Metropolitan Municipality, South Africa.

== Participants ==
Twelve of the fourteen COSAFA member took take part in the competition with Comoros entering the competition for the first time. Also rejoining the competition would be Eswatini who didn't compete in last year's tournament. The draw was held on 3 July.

- Angola
- Botswana
- Comoros
- Eswatini
- Madagascar
- Malawi
- Mauritius
- Mozambique
- Namibia
- South Africa
- Zambia
- Zimbabwe

== Venues ==
Groups A, B, C, Semifinals and Final	Groups A, B, and C	Host location in South Africa.
KwaZakele	Port Elizabeth	Host location in South Africa.
Wolfson Stadium	Gelvandale Stadium	Host location in South Africa.
Capacity: 10,000	Capacity: 3,000	Host location in South Africa.

== Group stage ==
The group stage is composed of three groups of four teams each. Group winners and the best runner-up amongst all groups advance to the semi-finals.

- All times are South African Standard Time (UTC+2).

=== Group A ===
Pos	Team	Pld	W	D	L	GF	GA	GD	Pts	Qualification
1	South Africa (H)	3	3	0	0	23	1	+22	9	Advance to knockout stage
2	Malawi	3	2	0	1	16	3	+13	6	
3	Madagascar	3	1	0	2	5	6	−1	3	
4	Comoros	3	0	0	3	1	35	−34	0	

Updated to match(es) played on 31 July 2019. Source:
(H) Hosts
31 July 2019
12:45

Malawi	2–0	Madagascar
Vinkhumbu 81'; Kapanda 88'	Report

Wolfson Stadium, KwaZakele
31 July 2019
15:30

South Africa	17–0	Comoros
Makhubela 16'; Fulutudilu 20'; Melanie 21' (o.g.); Makhabane 23'; Jane 38', 53', 79', 89'; Ndimeni 44'; Mbane 47', 63'; Mthandi 71', 78', 83'; Magaia 76', 81'; Biyana 81'	Report

Wolfson Stadium, KwaZakele

2 August 2019
10:00

Comoros	1–5	Madagascar
Mari 41'	Report	Nivonirina 1'; Razanampiavy 3'; Rasoanandrasana 20', 51'; Razananivo 45+2'

Wolfson Stadium, KwaZakele
2 August 2019
15:30

South Africa	3–1	Malawi
Ramalepe 36'; Cesane 68'; Mthandi 85'	Report	Simwaka 4'

Wolfson Stadium, KwaZakele

5 August 2019
12:45

South Africa	3–0	Madagascar
Fulutudilu 9'; Jane 38'; Razafimanantsoa 77' (o.g.)	Report

Wolfson Stadium, KwaZakele
5 August 2019
12:45

Malawi	13–0	Comoros
Simwaka 17', 17'; Kasenda 31', 43', 44', 48', 62', 67', 88', 90'; Thom 41', 47'; Kapanda 66'	Report

Gelvandale Stadium, Port Elizabeth

=== Group B ===
Pos	Team	Pld	W	D	L	GF	GA	GD	Pts	Qualification
1	Zambia	3	2	1	0	18	2	+16	7	Advance to knockout stage
2	Botswana	3	2	1	0	4	0	+4	7	Advance to knockout stage as best runner-up
3	Namibia	3	1	0	2	10	4	+6	3	
4	Mauritius	3	0	0	3	0	26	−26	0	

Updated to match(es) played on 1 August 2019. Source:
1 August 2019
12:45

Zambia	15–0	Mauritius
Nachula 8', 27', 35', 53', 59', 68', 74', 85'; G. Chanda 19', 45+3'; Mwakapila 32'; H. Chanda 45'; Jérôme 71' (o.g.); Chileshe 79'; Chewe 84'	Report

Wolfson Stadium, KwaZakele
1 August 2019
15:30

Namibia	0–1	Botswana
	Report	Abueng 44'

Wolfson Stadium, KwaZakele

3 August 2019
10:00

Zambia	3–2	Namibia
Mubanga 37', 76'; Mwakapila 60'	Report	Coleman 42' (pen.); Kordom 79'

Wolfson Stadium, KwaZakele
3 August 2019
12:45

Mauritius	0–3	Botswana
	Report	Galekhutle 21'; Mosotho 37'; Dithebe 77'

Wolfson Stadium, KwaZakele

6 August 2019
15:30

Zambia	0–0	Botswana
	Report

Wolfson Stadium, KwaZakele
6 August 2019
15:30

Namibia	8–0	Mauritius
Coleman 3', 48', 74', 75'; Uueziua 24'; Shikusho 30'; Jossob 45'; Mulunga 88'	Report

Gelvandale Stadium, Port Elizabeth

=== Group C ===
Pos	Team	Pld	W	D	L	GF	GA	GD	Pts	Qualification
1	Zimbabwe	3	3	0	0	15	1	+14	9	Advance to knockout stage
2	Eswatini	3	2	0	1	7	8	−1	6	
3	Angola	3	1	0	2	4	9	−5	3	
4	Mozambique	3	0	0	3	2	10	−8	0	

Updated to match(es) played on 1 August 2019. Source: COSAFA
31 July 2019
10:00

Zimbabwe	4–1	Angola
Msipa 3'; Neshamba 19', 45', 59'	Report	Makua 45'

Wolfson Stadium, KwaZakele
1 August 2019
10:00

Mozambique	1–3	Eswatini
Moçambique 3'	Report	Sanga 53'; Ngcamphalala 58'; P. Dlamini 62'

Wolfson Stadium, KwaZakele

2 August 2019
12:45

Zimbabwe	4–0	Mozambique
Nyaumwe 9', 67'; Msipa 23'; Neshamba 44'	Report

Wolfson Stadium, KwaZakele
3 August 2019
15:30

Angola	0–4	Eswatini
	Report	Ngcamphalala 6'; Gwebu 57'; Sanga 65'; Simelane 90'

Wolfson Stadium, KwaZakele

5 August 2019
15:30

Zimbabwe	7–0	Eswatini
Msipa 3', 9', 42', 78'; Neshamba 25'; Chirandu 32', 64'	Report

Wolfson Stadium, KwaZakele
5 August 2019
15:30

Mozambique	1–3	Angola
David 9'	Report	Maonte 18', 81'; A. Lopes 36'

Gelvandale Stadium, Port Elizabeth

== Knockout stage ==
=== Semi-finals ===
8 August 2019
12:30

Zambia	4–0	Botswana
Nachula 12', 78'; Mubanga 26'; Mwakapila 33'	Report

Wolfson Stadium, KwaZakele
8 August 2019
15:30

South Africa	3–1	Zimbabwe
Mbane 18'; Mthandi 45+2'; Ndimeni 81'	Report	Chirandu 21'

Wolfson Stadium, KwaZakele

=== Bronze medal match ===
10 August 2019
15:00

Botswana	0–3	Zimbabwe
	Report	Muzongondi 48', 90'; Chirandu 52'

Wolfson Stadium, KwaZakele

=== Final ===
11 August 2019
15:00

Zambia	0–1	South Africa
	Report	Makhubela 22'

Wolfson Stadium, KwaZakele

== Statistics ==
=== Goalscorers ===
There were 117 goals scored in 22 matches, for an average of 5.32 goals per match.

10 goals

- (Zambia) Racheal Nachula

8 goals

- (Malawi) Linda Kasenda

6 goals

- (Zimbabwe) Emmaculate Msipa

5 goals

- (Namibia) Zenatha Coleman
- (South Africa) Refiloe Jane
- (South Africa) Amanda Mthandi
- (Zimbabwe) Rudo Neshamba

4 goals

- (Zimbabwe) Mavis Chirandu

3 goals

- (Malawi) Asimenye Simwaka
- (South Africa) Bambanani Mbane
- (Zambia) Hellen Mubanga
- (Zambia) Mary Mwakapila

2 goals

- (Angola) Laurinda Maonte
- (Eswatini) Tenanile Mgcamphalala
- (Eswatini) Nomvula Sanga
- (Madagascar) Marie Rasoanandrasana
- (Malawi) Zainab Kapanda
- (Malawi) Sabinah Thom
- (South Africa) Ode Fulutudilu
- (South Africa) Hildah Magaia
- (South Africa) Tiisetso Makhubela
- (South Africa) Busisiwe Ndimeni
- (Zambia) Grace Chanda
- (Zimbabwe) Felistas Muzongondi
- (Zimbabwe) Marjory Nyaumwe

1 goal

- (Angola) Cristina Makua
- (Angola) Arminda Lopes
- (Botswana) Michelle Abueng
- (Botswana) Keitumetse Dithebe
- (Botswana) Esalenna Galekhutle
- (Botswana) Tshegofatso Mosotho
- (Comoros) Wafat Mari
- (Eswatini) Phumzile Dlamini
- (Eswatini) Sibonelo Gwebu
- (Eswatini) Nonhle Simelane
- (Madagascar) Hanitriniana Nivonirina
- (Madagascar) Aimée Razanampiavy
- (Madagascar) Solomampionona Razananivo
- (Malawi) Salome Vinkhumbu
- (Mozambique) Violeta David
- (Mozambique) Lúcia Leila
- (Namibia) Lorraine Jossob
- (Namibia) Annouscka Kordom
- (Namibia) Anna Shikusho
- (Namibia) Lovisa Mulunga
- (Namibia) Beverly Uueziua
- (South Africa) Kholosa Biyana
- (South Africa) Noxolo Cesane
- (South Africa) Mamello Makhabane
- (South Africa) Lebogang Ramalepe
- (Zambia) Hellen Chanda
- (Zambia) Theresa Chewe
- (Zambia) Rhoda Chileshe

1 own goal

- (Comoros) Hanifa Melanie (against South Africa)
- (Madagascar) Lalaina Razafimanantsoa (against South Africa)
- (Mauritius) Martina Jérôme (against Zambia)
