= Beverly Uueziua =

Namibian footballer (born 1999)

Personal information
- Date of birth: 26 May 1999 (age 27)
- Position: Midfielder

Team information
- Current team: Girls & Goals

Senior career*
| Years | Team | Apps | (Gls) |
- Girls & Goals

International career
- Namibia U15
- Namibia U17
- Namibia
- * Club domestic league appearances and goals

Beverly Uueziua (born 26 May 1999) is a Namibian footballer who plays as a midfielder for Namibia Women's Super League club Girls & Goals and the Namibia women's national team.

== International career ==
Uueziua capped for Namibia at senior level during the 2019 COSAFA Women's Championship.

=== International goals ===
Scores and results list Namibia's goal tally first

| No. | Date | Venue | Opponent | Score | Result | Competition |
|---|---|---|---|---|---|---|
| 1 | 6 August 2019 | Gelvandale Stadium, Port Elizabeth, South Africa | Mauritius | 2–0 | 8–0 | 2019 COSAFA Women's Championship |
