= Tenanile Ngcamphalala =

Liswati footballer

Personal information
- Full name: Tenanile Sandiswa Ngcamphalala
- Date of birth: 15 February 1998 (age 28)
- Height: 1.67 m (5 ft 6 in)
- Position: Forward

Team information
- Current team: Young Buffaloes

Senior career*
Years	Team	Apps	(Gls)
–2021	Young Buffaloes		
2022	Malabo Kings	12	(23)
2023–	Young Buffaloes		

International career
2019–	Eswatini		
- * Club domestic league appearances and goals

Tenanile Sandiswa Ngcamphalala (born 15 February 1998) is a Liswati footballer who plays as a forward for Young Buffaloes FC and the Eswatini women's national team.

== Club career ==
In 2022, Ngcamphalala signed for Equatorial Guinean side Malabo Kings, becoming the first Swazi female player to play abroad. However, the transfer was described as "criticised and marked by allegations of failing to follow player transfer protocol". She helped the club win the league and was the top scorer of the 2021–22 Equatoguinean Primera División femenina season with 23 goals.

== International career ==
Ngcamphalala played for the Eswatini women's national football team at the 2020 COSAFA Women's Championship, where she was third on the top scorers list with three goals. She has captained the Eswatini women's national football team.

== Style of play ==
Ngcamphalala mainly operates as a striker.

== International goals ==
Scores and results list Eswatini's goal tally first, score column indicates score after each Ngcamphalala goal.

List of international goals scored by Tenanile Ngcamphalala
No.	Date	Venue	Opponent	Score	Result	Competition
1	1 August 2019	Wolfson Stadium, Ibhayi, South Africa	Mozambique	2–1	3–1	2019 COSAFA Women's Championship
2	3 August 2019	Wolfson Stadium, Ibhayi, South Africa	Angola	1–0	4–0	2019 COSAFA Women's Championship
3	3 November 2020	Wolfson Stadium, Ibhayi, South Africa	Comoros	2–2	4–2	2020 COSAFA Women's Championship
4	9 November 2020	Gelvandale Stadium, Port Elizabeth, South Africa	Angola	1–1	3–4	2020 COSAFA Women's Championship
5	9 November 2020	Gelvandale Stadium, Port Elizabeth, South Africa	Angola	3–1	3–4	2020 COSAFA Women's Championship
6	23 September 2023	Somhlolo National Stadium, Lobamba, Eswatini	Burkina Faso	2–3	2–3	2024 Women's Africa Cup of Nations qualification
7	4 October 2023	Lucas Moripe Stadium, Pretoria, South Africa	Madagascar	1–1	2–1	2023 COSAFA Women's Championship
8	22 October 2024	Nelson Mandela Bay Stadium, Gqeberha, South Africa	Seychelles	2–0	6–0	2024 COSAFA Women's Championship
9	22 October 2024	Nelson Mandela Bay Stadium, Gqeberha, South Africa	Seychelles	4–0	6–0	2024 COSAFA Women's Championship
10	22 October 2024	Nelson Mandela Bay Stadium, Gqeberha, South Africa	Seychelles	5–0	6–0	2024 COSAFA Women's Championship
