= 2022 COSAFA Women's Championship =

Tournament details
- Host country: South Africa
- Dates: 31 August—11 September 2022
- Teams: 12 (from 1 confederation)
- Venue(s): 2 (in 1 host city)

Final positions
- Champions: Zambia (1st title)
- Runners-up: South Africa
- Third place: Tanzania
- Fourth place: Namibia

Tournament statistics
- Matches played: 22
- Goals scored: 70 (3.18 per match)
- Top scorer(s): (Zambia) Barbra Banda (10 goals)
- Best player(s): (Zambia) Barbra Banda
- Best goalkeeper: (Zambia) Catherine Musonda
- Fair play award: Tanzania
- All statistics correct as of 7 September 2022.

The 2022 COSAFA Women's Championship is the 10th edition of the COSAFA Women's Championship, a women's international football tournament for national teams organised by COSAFA, teams from Southern Africa. It takes place from 31 August to 11 September 2022 in South Africa.

Tanzania are the defending champion by having defeated Malawi 1–0 goals on 9 October 2021 in the final.

== Participating nations ==
Note: All appearance statistics exclude the 2008 edition.

National team	FIFA Ranking	Best Performance
Angola	141	Group stage (2006, 2019, 2020, 2021)
Botswana	151	Runners-up (2020)
Comoros	179	Group stage (2019, 2020)
Eswatini	171	Group stage (2002, 2006, 2017, 2018, 2019, 2020, 2021)
Lesotho	167	Group stage (2002, 2006, 2011, 2017, 2018, 2020)
Tanzania (guest)	155	Champions (2021)
Malawi	158	Runners-up (2021)
Mauritius	185	Group stage (2017, 2019)
Mozambique	170	Fourth place (2002)
Namibia	146	Runners-up (2006)
South Africa B	54	Champions (2002, 2006, 2017, 2018, 2019, 2020)
Zambia	80	Runners-up (2019)

- Note: South Africa entered their B team, as their A team was involved in friendly matches against Brazil at the same time as the tournament. Their matches thus do not count towards the FIFA ranking.

=== Did not enter ===
- Madagascar
- Seychelles
- Zimbabwe

== Venue ==
Matches will be held at the Nelson Mandela Bay Stadium, NMU Stadium and Wolfson Stadium in Port Elizabeth, South Africa.

Port Elizabeth is located in South Africa	Port Elizabeth		
Port Elizabeth is located in South Africa	Nelson Mandela Bay Stadium	Wolfson Stadium	NMU Stadium
Port Elizabeth is located in South Africa	Capacity: 46,000	Capacity: 10,000	Capacity: 15,000

== Officials ==
Referees

- (Botswana) Itumeleng Methikga
- (Lesotho) Mathabo Kolokotoane

Assistant Referees

- (Madagascar) Pélagie Rakotozafinoro
- (South Africa) Maneo Tau
- (Zambia) Mercy Zulu
- (Mozambique) Roda Mondlane

== Group stage ==
- All matches were played at South Africa.
- Times listed are UTC+02:00.

Key to colours in group tables
The top finisher in each group and best runner-up qualified for the Knocokout-stage

=== Group A ===
Pos	Team	Pld	W	D	L	GF	GA	GD	Pts	Qualification
1	South Africa B (H)	3	2	1	0	8	1	+7	7	Qualified for Knockout stage
2	Mozambique	3	1	2	0	7	2	+5	5	
3	Angola	3	1	1	1	4	4	0	4	
4	Mauritius	3	0	0	3	0	12	−12	0	

Source: COSAFA
Rules for classification: 1) points; 2) head-to-head points; 3) head-to-head goal difference; 4) goal difference; 5) number of goals scored; 6) drawing of lots
(H) Hosts
31 August
12:00

Mauritius	0–5	Mozambique
	Report	Ninika 2'; Dadard 20' (o.g.); Tsanwane 29'; Gove 39'; Manuel 72'

Nelson Mandela Bay Stadium, Gqeberha
31 August
15:30

South Africa B	3–0	Angola
Maseko 21'; Shamase 35'; Sam 89'	Report

Nelson Mandela Bay Stadium, Gqeberha

3 September
12:00

Angola	1–1	Mozambique
Makua 27'	Report	Jorge 45+2'

Madibaz Stadium, Port Elizabeth
3 September
15:30

South Africa B	4–0	Mauritius
Sam 33', 47'; Maseko 78'; Sampson 90'	Report

Madibaz Stadium, Port Elizabeth
Referee: Mathabo Kolokotoane (Lesotho)

6 September
15:30

Mauritius	0–3	Angola
	Report	Luvunga 10', 81'; Evaristo 72'

Madibaz Stadium, Port Elizabeth
6 September
15:30

Mozambique	1–1	South Africa B
Cuta 28'	Report	Shamase 53'

Wolfson Stadium, Gqeberha

=== Group B ===
Pos	Team	Pld	W	D	L	GF	GA	GD	Pts	Qualification
1	Zambia	3	3	0	0	11	0	+11	9	Qualified for Knockout stage
2	Namibia	3	2	0	1	7	3	+4	6	Qualified for Knockout stage
3	Lesotho	3	1	0	2	3	9	−6	3	
4	Eswatini	3	0	0	3	1	10	−9	0	

Source: COSAFA
Rules for classification: 1) points; 2) head-to-head points; 3) head-to-head goal difference; 4) goal difference; 5) number of goals scored; 6) drawing of lots
1 September
12:00

Lesotho	3–0	Eswatini
Rabale 7', 33', 88'	Report

Nelson Mandela Bay Stadium, Gqeberha
1 September
15:30

Zambia	2–0	Namibia
Banda 4', 71'	Report

Nelson Mandela Bay Stadium, Gqeberha

4 September
12:00

Namibia	5–1	Eswatini
Kooper 22', 70'; Ngonda 25'; Kotjipati 74'; Coleman 90+5'	Report	Ndzinisa 45'

Madibaz Stadium, Port Elizabeth
4 September
15:30

Zambia	7–0	Lesotho
Banda 11', 30', 48', 52', 56'; Katongo 45'; Mapepa 66'	Report

Madibaz Stadium, Port Elizabeth

6 September
12:00

Lesotho	0–2	Namibia
	Report	Hikuam 17'; Coleman 53'

Madibaz Stadium, Port Elizabeth
6 September
12:00

Eswatini	0–2	Zambia
	Report	Phiri 40'; Banda 83'

Wolfson Stadium, Gqeberha

=== Group C ===
Pos	Team	Pld	W	D	L	GF	GA	GD	Pts	Qualification
1	Tanzania	3	2	1	0	6	1	+5	7	Qualified for Knockout stage
2	Botswana	3	1	2	0	7	1	+6	5	
3	Malawi	3	1	1	1	8	4	+4	4	
4	Comoros	3	0	0	3	0	15	−15	0	

Source: COSAFA
Rules for classification: 1) points; 2) head-to-head points; 3) head-to-head goal difference; 4) goal difference; 5) number of goals scored; 6) drawing of lots
2 September
12:00

Tanzania	3–0	Comoros
Minja 14'; Lunyamila 42', 51'	Report

Madibaz Stadium, Port Elizabeth
2 September
15:30

Botswana	1–1	Malawi
Gaonyadiwe 14'	Report	Mvula 7'

Madibaz Stadium, Port Elizabeth

5 September
12:00

Malawi	6–0	Comoros
Chiyembekeza 18'; Kadzere 46'; T. Chawinga 63', 76', 82'; Mvula 90+1'	Report

Madibaz Stadium, Port Elizabeth
5 September
15:30

Botswana	0–0	Tanzania
	Report

Madibaz Stadium, Port Elizabeth

7 September
15:30

Tanzania	3–1	Malawi
Minja 20'; Msewa 45'; Clement 59'	Report	Simwaka 65'

Madibaz Stadium, Port Elizabeth
7 September
15:30

Comoros	0–6	Botswana
	Report	Gaonyadiwe 51', 53', 90'; Radiakanyo 43'; Mosotho 68'

Wolfson Stadium, Gqeberha

=== Ranking of runner-up teams ===
Pos	Grp	Team	Pld	W	D	L	GF	GA	GD	Pts	Qualification
1	B	Namibia	3	2	0	1	7	3	+4	6	Advance to Knockout stage
2	C	Botswana	3	1	2	0	7	1	+6	5	
3	A	Mozambique	3	1	2	0	7	2	+5	5	

Source: COSAFA

== Knockout stage ==
- In the knockout stage, extra-time and a penalty shoot-out will be used to decide the winner if necessary.

=== Bracket ===
Semi-finals
9 September—Gqeberha
Zambia	2
Tanzania	1
9 September—Gqeberha
South Africa B	1
Namibia	0

Final
11 September—Gqeberha
Zambia	1
South Africa B	0
Third Place match
11 September—Gqeberha
Tanzania	2
Namibia	1

=== Semi-finals ===
9 September 2022
12:00

Zambia	2–1	Tanzania
Banda 12'; Zulu 46'	Report	Mweemba 28' (o.g.)

Wolfson Stadium, Gqeberha
9 September 2022
15:00

South Africa B	1–0	Namibia
Sam 82'	Report

Wolfson Stadium, Gqeberha

=== Third place match ===
11 September 2022
12:00

Tanzania	2–1	Namibia
Bahera 12'; Naris 88' (o.g.)	Report	Mnunka 20' (o.g.)

Wolfson Stadium, Gqeberha

=== Final ===
11 September 2022
15:00

Zambia	1–0 (a.e.t.)	South Africa B
Banda 109'	Report

Wolfson Stadium, Gqeberha
Attendance: 15,000 (disputed)

== Goalscorers ==
There were 70 goals scored in 22 matches, for an average of 3.18 goals per match (as of 11 September 2022).

10 goals

- (Zambia) Barbra Banda

5 goals

- (Botswana) Ontlametse Gaonyadiwe

4 goals

- (South Africa) Lithemba Sam

3 goals

- (Lesotho) Boitumelo Rabale
- (Malawi) Tabitha Chawinga

2 goals

- (Angola) Sara Luvunga
- (Malawi) Wezzie Mvula
- (Mozambique) Cidalia Cuta
- (Namibia) Zenatha Coleman
- (Namibia) Ivone Kooper
- (Namibia) Memory Ngonda
- (South Africa) Refilwe Maseko
- (South Africa) Sphumelele Shamase
- (Tanzania) Enekia Lunyamila
- (Tanzania) Donisia Minja

1 goal

- (Angola) Teresa Evaristo
- (Angola) Cristina Makua
- (Botswana) Tshegofatso Mosotho
- (Botswana) Lesego Radiakanyo
- (Eswatini) Sisanda Ndzinisa
- (Malawi) Fazila Chiyembekeza
- (Malawi) Rose Kadzere
- (Malawi) Asimenye Simwaka
- (Mozambique) Deolinda Gove
- (Mozambique) Isabel Jorge
- (Mozambique) Cina Manuel
- (Mozambique) Lonica Tsanwane
- (Namibia) Veweziwa Kotjipati
- (South Africa) Michelle Sampson
- (Tanzania) Christer Bahera
- (Tanzania) Diana Msewa
- (Tanzania) Opa Tukumbuke
- (Zambia) Evarine Katongo
- (Zambia) Xiomara Mapepa
- (Zambia) Eneless Phiri
- (Zambia) Misozi Zulu

1 own goal

- (Mauritius) Elsa Dadard (against Mozambique)
- (Namibia) Emma Naris (against Tanzania)
- (Tanzania) Aisha Mnunka (against Namibia)
- (Zambia) Lushomo Mweemba (against Tanzania)
