= Arminda Lopes =

Angolan footballer, born 1999

Ary Papel
Personal information
- Full name: Arminda Paulina Lopes
- Date of birth: 10 February 1999 (age 27)
- Position: Forward

Team information
- Current team: 4 de Junho do Huambo
- Number: 7

Senior career*
Years	Team	Apps	(Gls)
- Polivalente do Golf2
- Renascer do Estoril
- 1° de Agosto
2021–	4 de Junho do Huambo		

International career
2019–	Angola	17	(5)
- * Club domestic league appearances and goals

Arminda Paulina Lopes (born 10 February 1999), known as Ary Papel, is an Angolan footballer who plays as a forward for Campeonato Nacional Sénior Feminino club 4 de Junho do Huambo and captains the Angola national team.

== Early life ==
Ary Papel began playing sports at the age of four or five, initially taking up basketball before transitioning to football. Raised in a family where women actively played the sport, she developed a strong passion for the game from an early age despite facing personal hardships. She has since spoken openly about overcoming anxiety and depression during her youth, particularly in the period following her mother's illness.

== Club career ==
Ary Papel began her club career in Angola, representing Polivalente do Golf2 before moving to Renascer do Estoril. She later featured for 1° de Agosto, one of the country's prominent clubs, continuing her development at senior level.

In search of financial stability, she temporarily switched from eleven-a-side football to futsal, noting that futsal in Angola offered remuneration at a time when women's football did not. She subsequently joined 4 de Junho do Huambo, where she further established herself in domestic competition.

On 11 August 2024, Papel was awarded the Golden Boot as the top scorer of the Campeonato Nacional do Torneio Feminino for the third consecutive year, having scored 14 goals this year. She opened the scoring in the final, but her team ultimately fell 2–1 to finish as runners-up.

== International career ==
With the Angola women's national side returning to competition after eight years, Ary Papel earned a call-up for the 2019 COSAFA Women's Championship. Starting the opener against Zimbabwe on 31 July 2019. She went on to score her first international goal against Mozambique on 5 August 2019 in a 3–1 win.

It was in the 2026 Women's Africa Cup of Nations qualification campaign that Ary Papel rose to prominence, scoring three times over two matches against Zimbabwe to secure Angola's place in the final round.

=== International statistics ===
As of match played 21 February 2026

Appearances and goals by national team and year
National team	Year	Apps	Goals
Angola	2019	3	1
Angola	2021	2	0
Angola	2023	4	0
Angola	2024	2	0
Angola	2025	4	3
Angola	2026	2	1
Total		17	5

Scores and results list Angola's goal tally first, score column indicates score after each Ary Papel goal.

List of international goals scored by Ary Papel
No.	Date	Venue	Opponent	Score	Result	Competition
1	5 August 2019	Port Elizabeth, South Africa	Mozambique	2–1	3–1	2019 COSAFA Women's Championship
2	20 February 2025	Luanda, Angola	Zimbabwe	1–0	2–1	2026 Women's Africa Cup of Nations qualification
3	20 February 2025	Luanda, Angola	Zimbabwe	2–1	2–1	2026 Women's Africa Cup of Nations qualification
4	26 February 2025	Pretoria, South Africa	Zimbabwe	1–2	1–2	2026 Women's Africa Cup of Nations qualification
5	18 February 2026	Polokwane, South Africa	Lesotho	3–1	3–1	2025 COSAFA Women's Championship
