= 2020 COSAFA Women's Championship =

Tournament details
- Host country: South Africa
- Dates: 3–14 November 2020
- Teams: 10 (from 1 confederation)
- Venues: 2 (in 1 host city)

Final positions
- Champions: South Africa (7th title)
- Runners-up: Botswana

Tournament statistics
- Matches played: 15
- Goals scored: 64 (4.27 per match)
- Top scorer: (South Africa) Sibulele Holweni (8 goals)

The 2020 COSAFA Women's Championship is the eighth edition of the COSAFA Women's Championship, a women's international football tournament for national teams organised by COSAFA, teams from Southern Africa. It takes place from 3 to 14 November in the Nelson Mandela Bay Metropolitan Municipality, South Africa.

== Participants ==
Nine of the fourteen COSAFA member took take part in the competition. Tanzania from the CECAFA region entered as guests. Eswatini and Lesotho entered late because of uncertainety due to the COVID-19 pandemic. Namibia withdrew on 21 October 2020. The draw then was held on 22 October 2020.

- Angola
- Botswana
- Comoros
- Eswatini
- Lesotho
- Malawi
- South Africa
- Tanzania (guest)
- Zambia
- Zimbabwe

== Venues ==
Groups A, B, C, Semifinals and Final	Groups A, B, and C	Host location in South Africa.
KwaZakele	Port Elizabeth	Host location in South Africa.
Wolfson Stadium	Gelvandale Stadium	Host location in South Africa.
Capacity: 10,000	Capacity: 3,000	Host location in South Africa.

== Group stage ==
The group stage is composed of three groups of four teams each. Group winners and the best runner-up amongst all groups advance to the semi-finals. As Group A has 4 teams, the results against the bottom-placed team in this group are not counted towards the best runner-up calculation.

- All times are South African Standard Time (UTC+2).

=== Group A ===
Pos	Team	Pld	W	D	L	GF	GA	GD	Pts	Qualification
1	South Africa (H)	3	3	0	0	14	0	+14	9	Advance to knockout stage
2	Angola	3	1	1	1	5	6	−1	4	
3	Eswatini	3	1	0	2	7	11	−4	3	
4	Comoros	3	0	1	2	3	12	−9	1	

Updated to match(es) played on 6 November 2020. Source:
(H) Hosts
3 November 2020
12:30

Eswatini	4–2	Comoros
P. Dlamini 65', 90+1'; Mgcamphalala 75'; Nonjabuliso 87'	Report	Abdourahmane 15'; Hadhiroimi 53'

Wolfson Stadium, Ibhayi
3 November 2020
15:30

South Africa	2–0	Angola
Mhlongo 40'; Dhlamini 61'	Report

Wolfson Stadium, Ibhayi

6 November 2020
12:30

Comoros	1–1	Angola
Haoudadji 83'	Report	Makua 66'

Wolfson Stadium, Ibhayi
6 November 2020
15:30

Eswatini	0–5	South Africa
	Report	Kgoale 3', 60'; Holweni 37'; Salgado 47', 90'

Wolfson Stadium, Ibhayi

9 November 2020
15:30

Angola	4–3	Eswatini
Bia 25'; Afonso 45+4' (pen.); Makua 57', 90+3' (pen.)	Report	Mgcamphalala 4', 37'; Nkambule 31'

Gelvandale Stadium, Port Elizabeth
9 November 2020
15:30

South Africa	7–0	Comoros
Holweni 8', 31', 49', 88', 90+2'; Magaia 42'; Mthandi 51'	Report

Wolfson Stadium, Ibhayi

=== Group B ===
Pos	Team	Pld	W	D	L	GF	GA	GD	Pts	Qualification
1	Malawi	2	2	0	0	10	0	+10	6	Advance to knockout stage
2	Zambia	2	1	0	1	8	1	+7	3	Advance to knockout stage as best runner-up
3	Lesotho	2	0	0	2	0	17	−17	0	

Updated to match(es) played on 7 November 2020. Source:
4 November 2020
12:30

Zambia	8–0	Lesotho
Banda 30', 52', 70'; Chilufya 57'; May. Mulenga 65'; Chanda 66', 76'; Lungu 84'	Report

Wolfson Stadium, Ibhayi

7 November 2020
15:30

Malawi	9–0	Lesotho
Kapanda 3'; Ta. Chawinga 5', 23', 45' (pen.), 45', 58', 75'; Te. Chawinga 12'; Simwaka 57'	Report

Wolfson Stadium, Ibhayi

9 November 2020
12:30

Zambia	0–1	Malawi
	Report	Te. Chawinga 31'

Wolfson Stadium, Ibhayi

=== Group C ===
Pos	Team	Pld	W	D	L	GF	GA	GD	Pts	Qualification
1	Botswana	2	2	0	0	2	0	+2	6	Advance to knockout stage
2	Tanzania	2	1	0	1	1	1	0	3	
3	Zimbabwe	2	0	0	2	0	2	−2	0	

Updated to match(es) played on 7 November 2020. Source:
4 November 2020
15:30

Zimbabwe	0–1	Tanzania
	Report	Shekigenda 60'

Wolfson Stadium, Ibhayi

7 November 2020
12:30

Botswana	1–0	Tanzania
Thanda 48'	Report

Wolfson Stadium, Ibhayi

9 November 2020
12:30

Zimbabwe	0–1	Botswana
	Report	Tholekele 73'

Gelvandale Stadium, Port Elizabeth

=== Best runner-up ===
Pos	Team	Pld	W	D	L	GF	GA	GD	Pts	Qualification
1	Zambia	2	1	0	1	8	1	+7	3	Advance to knockout stage
2	Tanzania	2	1	0	1	1	1	0	3	
3	Angola	2	1	0	1	4	5	−1	3	

Updated to match(es) played on 7 November 2020. Source:

== Knockout stage ==
=== Semi-finals ===
12 November 2020
12:00

Botswana	2–1	Zambia
Gaofetoge 8'; Tholekele 39' (pen.)	Report	Lungu 45+5'

Wolfson Stadium, Ibhayi
12 November 2020
15:30

South Africa	6–2	Malawi
Kgoale 51', 64'; Magaia 62', 68', 75'; Holweni 74'	Report	Te. Chawinga 53'; Ta. Chawinga 78'

Wolfson Stadium, Ibhayi

1.Group B winner was originally scheduled to play the best runner-up of the group stage. But the regulations of the tournament didn't allow two teams from the same group to play against each other in the Semi-finals, and therefore the games had to be changed.

=== Final ===
14 November 2020
15:00

Botswana	1–2	South Africa
Thanda 85'	Report	Holweni 2'; Salgado 66'

Wolfson Stadium, Ibhayi

== Goalscorers ==
There were 64 goals scored in 15 matches, for an average of 4.27 goals per match.

8 goals

- (South Africa) Sibulele Holweni

7 goals

- (Malawi) Tabitha Chawinga

4 goals

- (South Africa) Nomvula Kgoale
- (South Africa) Hildah Magaia

3 goals

- (Angola) Alegria
- (Eswatini) Tenanile Mgcamphalala
- (Malawi) Temwa Chawinga
- (South Africa) Gabriela Salgado
- (Zambia) Barbra Banda

2 goals

- (Botswana) Mokgabo Thanda
- (Botswana) Refilwe Tholekele
- (Eswatini) Phumzile Dlamini
- (Zambia) Grace Chanda
- (Zambia) Ireen Lungu

1 goal

- (Angola) Ana Afonso
- (Angola) Bia
- (Botswana) Lone Gaofetoge
- (Comoros) Hairyat Abdourahmane
- (Comoros) Anlaouia Hadhiroimi
- (Comoros) Zaharouna Haoudadji
- (Eswatini) Celiwe Nkambule
- (Eswatini) Mokgale Nonjabuliso
- (Malawi) Zainab Kapanda
- (Malawi) Asimenye Simwaka
- (South Africa) Karabo Dhlamini
- (South Africa) Lonathemba Mhlongo
- (South Africa) Nonhlanhla Mthandi
- (Tanzania) Kadosho Shekigenda
- (Zambia) Prisca Chilufya
- (Zambia) Maylan Mulenga
