= Linda Kasenda =

Malawian footballer

Personal information
- Position: Forward

Senior career*
Years	Team	Apps	(Gls)
2012-2013	DD Sunshine	14+	(90+)
2013-2018	Skippers	18+	(93+)
2018	DD Sunshine	10+	(48+)
2019-2020	Skippers	10+	(25+)
Total		52+	(256+)

International career
2005-2020	Malawi	4	(13)
- * Club domestic league appearances and goals

Linda Kasenda is a Malawian footballer who plays as a forward for the Malawi women's national team.

== Life ==
Kasenda had a long career in football. Her school fees were paid for by the government.

On January 3, 2020, she announced her retirement from the national team after a 15-year career. She continued her work promoting the development of women's football in Malawi as an ambassador for the Malawi Football Association.

== International goals ==
No.	Date	Venue	Opponent	Score	Result	Competition
1.	5 August 2019	Gelvandale Stadium, Port Elizabeth, South Africa	Comoros	3–0	13–0	2019 COSAFA Women's Championship
2.	5 August 2019	Gelvandale Stadium, Port Elizabeth, South Africa	Comoros	5–0	13–0	2019 COSAFA Women's Championship
3.	5 August 2019	Gelvandale Stadium, Port Elizabeth, South Africa	Comoros	6–0	13–0	2019 COSAFA Women's Championship
4.	5 August 2019	Gelvandale Stadium, Port Elizabeth, South Africa	Comoros	8–0	13–0	2019 COSAFA Women's Championship
5.	5 August 2019	Gelvandale Stadium, Port Elizabeth, South Africa	Comoros	10–0	13–0	2019 COSAFA Women's Championship
6.	5 August 2019	Gelvandale Stadium, Port Elizabeth, South Africa	Comoros	11–0	13–0	2019 COSAFA Women's Championship
7.	5 August 2019	Gelvandale Stadium, Port Elizabeth, South Africa	Comoros	12–0	13–0	2019 COSAFA Women's Championship
8.	5 August 2019	Gelvandale Stadium, Port Elizabeth, South Africa	Comoros	13–0	13–0	2019 COSAFA Women's Championship
