= Kersley Levrai =

Mauritian footballer

Personal information
- Full name: Kersley Levrai
- Date of birth: June 21, 1981 (age 45)
- Place of birth: Mauritius
- Position: Defender

Team information
- Current team: AS de Vacoas-Phoenix

Senior career*
Years	Team	Apps	(Gls)
2006–	AS de Vacoas-Phoenix		

International career
2007–	Mauritius	1	(0)
- * Club domestic league appearances and goals

Kersley Levrai (born June 21, 1981) is a Mauritian football player who currently plays for AS de Vacoas-Phoenix in the Mauritian Premier League and for the Mauritius national football team as a defender.
