= Amanda Mthandi =

South African soccer player

Personal information
- Date of birth: 23 May 1996 (age 30)
- Place of birth: Soweto, South Africa
- Position: Forward

Team information
- Current team: JVW
- Number: 3

Senior career*
Years	Team	Apps	(Gls)
- University of Johannesburg
2020–2021	Badajoz		
2021–2023	University of Johannesburg		
2023-	JVW	1	

International career^{‡}
2018–	South Africa	7	(1)
- * Club domestic league appearances and goals ‡ National team caps and goals as of 7 April 2019

Amanda Mthandi (born 23 May 1996) is a South African soccer player who plays as a forward for JVW and the South Africa women's national team.

Mthandi was born in Soweto and studied transportation management at the University of Johannesburg (UJ). She was named the UJ Sportswoman of the Year in 2019.

== International goals ==
Scores and results list South Africa's goal tally first

No.	Date	Venue	Opponent	Score	Result	Competition
1	21 November 2018	Cape Coast Sports Stadium, Cape Coast, Ghana	Equatorial Guinea	6–1	7–1	2018 Africa Women Cup of Nations
2	31 July 2019	Wolfson Stadium, KwaZakele, South Africa	Comoros	10–0	17–0	2019 COSAFA Women's Championship
3	31 July 2019	Wolfson Stadium, KwaZakele, South Africa	Comoros	12–0	17–0	2019 COSAFA Women's Championship
4	31 July 2019	Wolfson Stadium, KwaZakele, South Africa	Comoros	16–0	17–0	2019 COSAFA Women's Championship
5	2 August 2019	Wolfson Stadium, KwaZakele, South Africa	Malawi	3–1	3–1	2019 COSAFA Women's Championship
6	8 August 2019	Wolfson Stadium, KwaZakele, South Africa	Zimbabwe	2–1	3–1	2019 COSAFA Women's Championship
