= Annouscka Kordom =

Namibian footballer (born 1997)

Personal information
- Full name: Annouscka Brummelda Kordom
- Date of birth: 12 August 1997 (age 29)
- Place of birth: Windhoek, Namibia
- Height: 1.65 m (5 ft 5 in)
- Position: Forward

Team information
- Current team: Capital FC Atletica

Youth career
- Young Beauties

College career
Years	Team	Apps	(Gls)
2016–2019	Corban Warriors	56	(17)

Senior career*
Years	Team	Apps	(Gls)
	JS Academy		(10)
- Capital FC Atletica
Total		32	(10)

International career
- Namibia U13
- Namibia U14
- Namibia U16
- Namibia U17
- Namibia U20
- Namibia U23
	Namibia	25	(3)
- * Club domestic league appearances and goals as of 13 November 2019

Annouscka Brummelda Kordom (born 12 August 1997) is a Namibian footballer who plays as a forward for American club Capital FC Atletica and the Namibia women's national team. She was part of the team at the 2014 African Women's Championship. On club level she played for JS Academy in Namibia. She played college soccer for Corban University in the United States.
