= Veweziwa Kotjipati =

Namibian footballer (born 1992)

Personal information
- Date of birth: 28 September 1992 (age 34)
- Place of birth: Epukiro, Namibia
- Height: 1.60 m (5 ft 3 in)
- Position: Left back

Team information
- Current team: Borussia Mönchengladbach II

Youth career
- 2009–2010: JS Academy

Senior career*
| Years | Team | Apps | (Gls) |
| 2010–2012 | JS Academy | | |
| 2012–2013 | SJC Hövelriege | | (12) |
| 2013 | Tus Lipperode | | |
| 2013–2015 | FSV Gütersloh 2009 | | |
| 2015–2018 | Arminia Bielefeld | 43 | (2) |
| 2018–2019 | Herforder SV | 12 | (0) |
| 2019– | Borussia Mönchengladbach | 6 | (0) |
| 2019– | Borussia Mönchengladbach II | 12 | (1) |

International career^{‡}
| 2006–2009 | Namibia U17 | | |
| 2010–2012 | Namibia U20 | | |
| 2010– | Namibia | | |
- * Club domestic league appearances and goals as of 14 May 2023 ‡ National team caps and goals as of 11 March 2013

Veweziwa Kotjipati (born 28 September 1992) is a Namibian footballer who plays as a left back for German Niederrheinliga club Borussia Mönchengladbach II and the Namibia women's national team. She has also been utilised as a midfielder or striker.

Kotjipati formerly played for JS Academy, a team that plays in the Namibia Women's Super League. She started in athletics at her school El Dorado High School in Windhoek before she became a footballer.

== Club career ==
Kotjipati recalls playing her first competitive games in the Nawisa Cup. During the time she was at JS Academy beginning in 2009, her talent was noticed which later allowed her to join the senior national side from 2010 onward. After a couple of good showings with Academy, she then joined the German women's sixth division team, SJC Hövelriege.

Kotjipati joined SJC Hövelriege in 2012, where she managed to score 12 goals in the two seasons that she played for the club. In her first season, she had several difficulties adapting to the new German playing style which resulted in some red card situations. She eventually managed to adapt and became one of the top scorers in the league in her second season.

In 2013, Kotjipati and another Brave Gladiator, Stacy Naris, joined Tus Lipperode, a team that plays in the German fourth-tier league.

== International career ==
In 2009, Kotjipati joined the Namibian national U-17 women's team and later the Young Gladiators U-20 squad. She joined the Brave Gladiators in 2010, whom she currently represents. She is one of the few Namibian women's footballers currently plying their trade overseas.

== Honours ==
JS Academy

- Namibia Women's Super League: 2011/12

Arminia Bielefeld

- Frauen-Regionalliga: 2015/16
