= La Redoute Stadium =

Stadium on Réunion island

Coordinates: 20.8842°S 55.4422°E

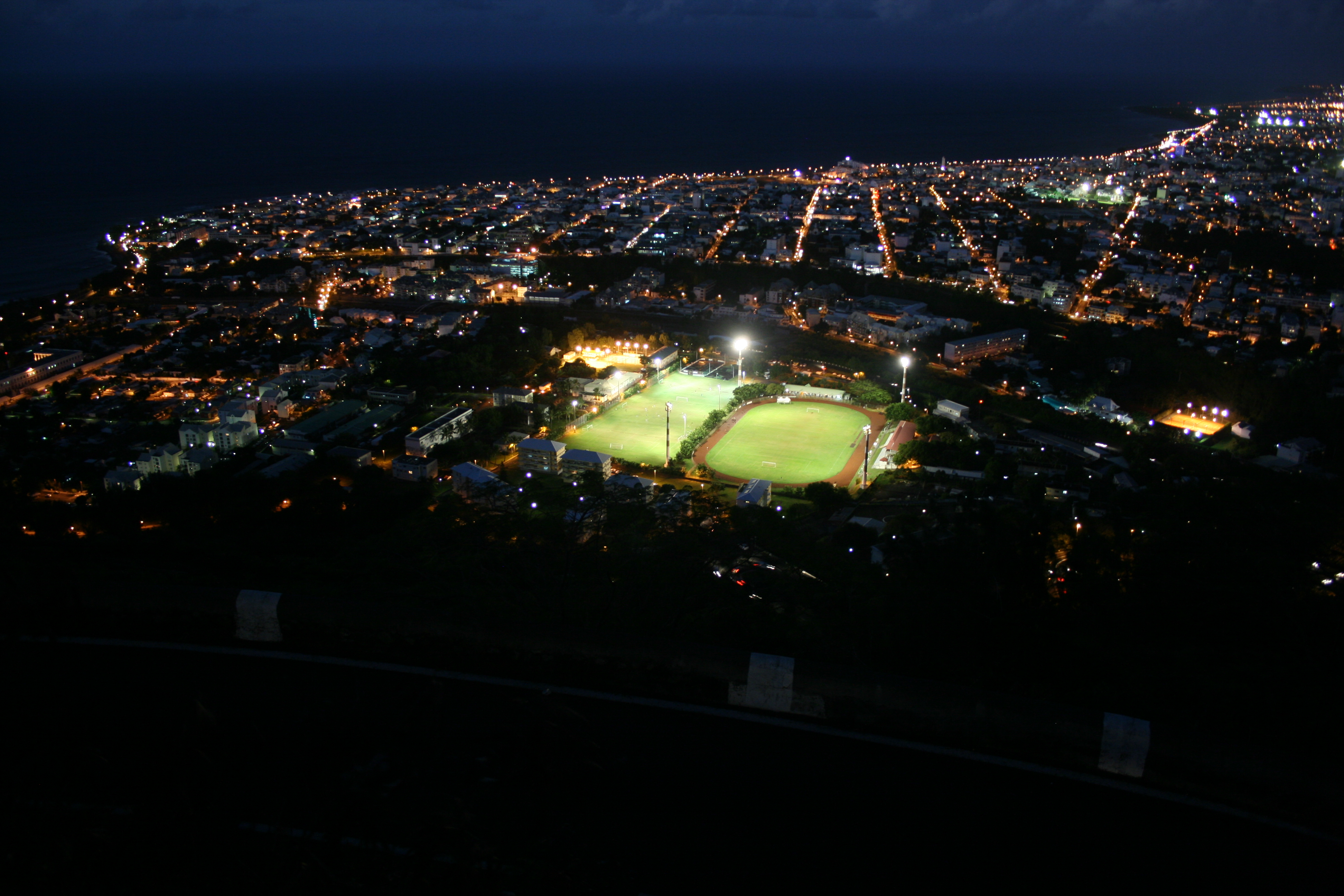
- Address: La Redoute
- Location: Saint Denis, Reunion
- Capacity: 2,000

The La Redoute Stadium (Stade de la Redoute in French) is a French Stadium on the island of Réunion, an overseas department in the south-western Indian Ocean.

It is located in Saint-Denis, the capital, on the small plateau hosting the neighborhood of La Redoute.

== History ==
Frequented by neighborhood joggers, this sports ground welcomes every year the arrival of Grand Raid, a mountain race that crosses the island from the Sud Sauvage. In the past, horse races and races of donkeys and pigs were organized there, and were lively, popular successes; the site supported a hippodrome that has now disappeared. It also had, for a time, a velodrome at the beginning of the 20th century.
