= Ana Afonso =

Portuguese model and actress (1976–2024)

- Born: Ana Carla Coelho Afonso; 24 April 1976; Faro, Portugal
- Died: 3 January 2024 (aged 47); Lisbon, Portugal
- Occupations: Model; actress
- Children: 3

Ana Carla Coelho Afonso (24 April 1976 – 3 January 2024) was a Portuguese model and actress.

== Biography ==
Afonso was part of the cast of the telenovela O Teu Olhar, shown between 2003 and 2004 on TVI, and participated in the reality TV show Quinta das Celebridades, where she had a romance with Brazilian actor and politician Alexandre Frota. Afonso also participated in the series Maré Alta, shown between 2004 and 2005 on SIC. Afonso also participated in numerous national and international advertising shots, as well as appearing in a national film, entitled "Lulu", released in 2022.

== Personal life and death ==
Afonso had three children: Beatriz, Diogo and Alice. In an interview, in 2023, with Júlia Pinheiro, on SIC, Afonso confessed that she had been an alcoholic in the past and revealed that she had a son with autism.

Afonso, who died by suicide at age 47 in Lisbon on 3 January 2024 when she jumped off the 25 de Abril Bridge, had reportedly been depressed.

== Filmography ==
Year	Work	Role	Broadcaster
1997	Abstracto		Film
1998–1999	Os Lobos	Tilde	RTP
1998	Terra Mãe	Friend of Fernanda	RTP
1999	Cromos de Portugal	–	RTP
2000–2001	Ajuste de Contas	Prostitute	RTP
2000–2003	Super Pai	Rosa	TVI
2003	Amanhecer	Sara	TVI
2003–2004	O Teu Olhar	Palmira Lapa	TVI
2004	Quinta das Celebridades	Participant	TVI
2004–2005	Maré Alta	–	SIC
2006	Eu não quero morrer hoje	–	Short film
2007	Dias Escuros	Victória	Short film
2008	1ª Vez, 16mm	Bárbara	Film
2017	Sim, Chef!	Client	RTP
2022	Lulu	Vanessa	
