= Theresa Chewe =

Zambian footballer (born 1997)

Personal information
- Place of birth: 27 November 1997 (age 28)
- Position: Forward

Team information
- Current team: Red Arrows

Senior career*
Years	Team	Apps	(Gls)
2013–2014	Red Arrows		
2015–2018	Indeni Roses		
2019–	Green Buffaloes		

International career^{‡}
2018–	Zambia	2+	(0)
- * Club domestic league appearances and goals ‡ National team caps and goals as of 8 April 2018

Theresa Chewe (born 27 November 1997) is a Zambian footballer who plays as a forward for Red Arrows FC and the Zambia women's national team.

== Honours ==
=== Club ===
Green Buffaloes Women

- COSAFA Women's Champions League: 2022
- FAZ Women's Super Division: 2019−20
