= Lorraine Jossob =

Namibian footballer (born 1993)

Personal information
- Date of birth: 4 May 1993 (age 33)
- Place of birth: Keetmanshoop, Namibia
- Position: Defender

Team information
- Current team: Arrows Ladies

Senior career*
Years	Team	Apps	(Gls)
- Spfr. Neukirch
- Arrows Ladies

International career^{‡}
- Namibia
- * Club domestic league appearances and goals ‡ National team caps and goals as of 11 october 2014 (before the 2014 African Women's Championship)

Lorraine Jossob (born 4 May 1993) is a Namibian footballer who plays as a defender for Namibia Women's Super League club Arrows Ladies FC and the Namibia women's national team. She was part of the team at the 2014 African Women's Championship. On club level she played for Spfr. Neukirch in Germany.
