= Mauritius women's national football team =

Mauritius
- Association: Mauritius Football Association
- Confederation: CAF (Africa)
- Sub-confederation: COSAFA (Southern Africa)
- Head coach: Kersley Levrai
- FIFA code: MRI
First colours	Second colours

FIFA ranking
- Current: 198 (20 October 2026)
- Highest: 117 (March 2018)
- Lowest: 198 (December 2025)

First international
- Unofficial; Mauritius 3–0 Rodrigues (Bambous, Mauritius; 3 April 2011); Official; Réunion 3–0 Mauritius (Saint-Denis, Réunion; 3 June 2012)

Biggest win
- Unofficial; Mauritius 5–0 Rodrigues (Quatre Bornes, Mauritius; 7 July 2022); Official; Mauritius 3–1 Seychelles (Saint Pierre, Mauritius; 5 December 2023)

Biggest defeat
- Zambia 15–0 Mauritius (Ibhayi, South Africa; 1 August 2019)

The Mauritius women's national football team is the first women's association football team that represents the country of Mauritius. They are controlled by the Mauritius Football Association and are members of FIFA, the Confederation of African Football (CAF), and the Council of Southern Africa Football Associations (COSAFA). The development of women's football in the country and in Africa as a whole faces a number of challenges, with a programme for women's football not being created in the country until 1997. FIFA gives money to the Mauritius Football Association, 10% of which is aimed at developing football in the country in areas that include women's football, sport medicine and futsal.

== History ==
In 1985, very few countries had a women's national football team and Mauritius was no exception, with a women's football programme only being established in the country in 1997. Their first match was against Réunion on 3 June 2012 in Saint-Denis. This match ended in a 3–0 defeat. A return match was planned for July 2012 in Mauritius, but this was put back to November 2012. The match was played in Bambous on 25 November 2012, with Réunion winning again, this time by 2 goals to 1.

Mauritius was scheduled to take part in several competitions, which they ended up withdrawing from before playing a single match. The list includes the 2002 Council of Southern Africa Football Associations (COSAFA) women's tournament in Harare, Zimbabwe from which they withdrew. In 2005, Zambia was supposed to host a regional COSAFA women's football tournament, with several countries agreeing to send teams including South Africa, Zimbabwe, Mozambique, Malawi, Seychelles, Mauritius, Madagascar, Zambia, Botswana, Namibia, Lesotho and Swaziland. The tournament eventually took place in 2006, but Mauritius did not send a team. Beyond that, they were scheduled to participate in the 2008 Women's U-20 World Cup qualification, where they were scheduled to play Zimbabwe in the preliminary round; however, Zimbabwe withdrew from the competition giving Mauritius an automatic bye into the first round. In that round Mauritius was supposed to play South Africa, but withdrew from the competition.

They took part in the 2019 COSAFA Women's Championship, losing all three matches in their group.

As of 2012, the head coach was Alain Jules. As of March 2012, the team was not ranked in the world by FIFA, as it had not yet participated in any matches against other FIFA members. By June 2020, they were bottom of the FIFA rankings.

== Recruitment and organisation ==
Women's football in Africa as a whole faces several challenges, including limited access to education, poverty amongst women in the wider society, and fundamental gender inequality present in the society that occasionally allows for female specific human rights abuses. Another problem with the development for the national team, one faced throughout the continent, is if quality female football players are found, many leave the country seeking greater opportunity in Northern Europe or the United States.

Women's football was formally established in Mauritius in 1997. As of 2009, there was no national or regional women's competition but a school competition existed. There are 17 clubs for women over the age of 16 and four youth clubs in the country. The country has three national women's football teams: senior, under-15, and under-19. In the period between 2002 and 2006, none of them played even one international match. 10% of the money from the FIFA Financial Assistance Programme (FAP) is targeted at the technical development of the game, which includes women's football, sport medicine and futsal. This compares to 15% for men's competitions and 4% for youth football development. Between 1991 and 2010 in Mauritius, there was no FIFA FUTURO III regional course for women's coaching, no women's football seminar held in the country and no FIFA MA course held for women/youth football.

== Results and fixtures ==
The following is a list of match results in the last 12 months, as well as any future matches that have been scheduled.

Win Draw Lose Fixture

=== 2026 ===
4 June 2026 2028 Olympic Qualification First round	Mauritius	2–1	Djibouti	Saint Pierre
19:00 UTC+4	Clair 1'; Gopal 90+6' (pen.)	Report	Geremew 38'	Stadium: Côte d'Or National Sports Complex; Referee: Nonjabulo Nonhle Ndlela (South Africa)

8 June 2026 2028 Olympic Qualification First round	Djibouti	0–1 (1–3 agg.)	Mauritius	Saint Pierre (Mauritius)
17:30 UTC+4		Report	Fourneau 75'	Stadium: Côte d'Or National Sports Complex

8 October 2026 2028 Olympic Qualification Second round	Mauritius	0–3	Ghana	Saint Pierre, Mauritius
18:30 UTC+4		Report	Kim 16'; Kusi 24'; Simon 45+3'	Stadium: Côte d'Or National Sports Complex; Referee: Sisay Raya (Ethiopia)

13 October 2026 2028 Olympic Qualification Second round	Ghana	7–0 (10–0 agg.)	Mauritius	Accra, Ghana
16:00 UTC+0	Badu 9'; Boakye 27'; Zakaria 32'; Abdulai 74', 90+3'; Cudjoe 87' (pen.); Amoh 89'	Report		Stadium: Accra Sports Stadium; Referee: Joselyne Nsabimana (Burundi)

== Coaching staff ==
=== Current coaching staff ===
As of 2026

Position	Name	Ref.
Head coach	(Mauritius) Kersley Levrai	
Assistant coach	(Mauritius) Anielle Collet	
Technical Director / MFA Officer	(Mauritius) Anielle Collet	

=== Manager history ===
Name	Period
(France) Pierre-Yves Bodineau	2019-2021
(Mauritius) Anielle Collet	2022–2023
(Mauritius) Kersley Levrai-	2023–present

== Players ==
=== Current squad ===
- The following players were called up for the 2028 Olympic Qualifiers against Djibouti on 4 and 8 June 2026.

No.	Pos.	Player	Date of birth (age)	Club
1	GK	Chaya Codoychurn	23 March 2004 (age 22)	(Mauritius Football Association) MFA HPC
16	GK	Marie Noël Edmond	24 December 1992 (age 33)	(Mauritius Football Association) AS Malherbes
3	DF	Marie Anaëlle Rassoie	8 February 1992 (age 34)	(Mauritius Football Association) Plaisance Spoutnik
5	DF	Elsa Laeticia Dadard	5 December 1994 (age 31)	(Mauritius Football Association) AS Quatre Bornes
8	DF	Marie Anaïs Fourneu	26 August 1998 (age 28)	(Mauritius Football Association) AS Quatre Bornes
13	DF	Eva Pierrot	26 January 2005 (age 21)	(Mauritius Football Association) MFA HPC
15	DF	Marie Orphélie Marianne	15 April 2001 (age 25)	(Mauritius Football Association) Plaisance Spoutnik
6	MF	Julie Gopal	10 April 2006 (age 20)	(French Football Federation) FC Lorient
7	MF	Clothilde Élodie Aliphon (Captain)	16 October 1992 (age 34)	(Mauritius Football Association) AS Quatre Bornes
10	MF	Marie Ambre Apollon	12 July 2006 (age 20)	(Mauritius Football Association) MFA HPC
11	MF	Melissa Crins	9 March 1989 (age 37)	(Royal Belgian Football Association) Royal Wallonia
14	MF	Fawellina Fiona Felicite	1 October 2002 (age 24)	(Mauritius Football Association) AS Quatre Bornes
4	FW	Jerusha Ramasawmy	8 January 2003 (age 23)	(Mauritius Football Association) MFA HPC
9	FW	Tracy Fourneau	11 May 2003 (age 23)	(Mauritius Football Association) AS Quatre Bornes
21	FW	Marie Adriana Rosette	4 June 2006 (age 20)	(Mauritius Football Association) MFA HPC

=== Recent call-ups ===
The following players have been called up to a Mauritius squad in the past 12 months.

Pos.	Player	Date of birth (age)	Caps	Goals	Club	Latest call-up
^{INJ} Player withdrew from the squad due to an injury.^{PRE} Preliminary squad.^{SUS} Player is serving a suspension.^{WD} Player withdrew for personal reasons.

=== Previous squads ===
COSAFA Women's Championship

- 2022 COSAFA Women's Championship squad
- 2024 COSAFA Women's Championship squad

== Records ==
*Active players in bold, statistics correct as of 31 August 2021.

=== Most capped players ===
#	Player	Year(s)	Caps

=== Top goalscorers ===
#	Player	Year(s)	Goals	Caps

== Competitive record ==
=== FIFA Women's World Cup ===
FIFA Women's World Cup record
Year	Round	Position	Pld	W	D*	L	GS	GA
(China) 1991	did not exist							
(Sweden) 1995	did not exist							
(United States) 1999	did not exist							
(United States) 2003	did not exist							
(China) 2007	did not enter							
(Germany) 2011	did not enter							
(Canada) 2015	did not qualify							
(France) 2019	did not enter							
(Australia) (New Zealand) 2023	did not enter							
(Brazil) 2027	to be determined							
**Appearances**	**0/10**	–	–	–	–	–	–	–

=== Olympic Games ===
Summer Olympics record
Year	Round	Position	Pld	W	D*	L	GS	GA
(United States) 1996	did not exist							
(Australia) 2000	did not exist							
(Greece) 2004	did not exist							
(China) 2008	did not enter							
(United Kingdom) 2012	did not enter							
(Brazil) 2016	did not enter							
(Japan) 2020	did not enter							
(France) 2024	did not enter							
(United States) 2028	to be determined							
(Australia) 2032	to be determined							
**Appearances**	**0/9**	–	–	–	–	–	–	–

*Draws include knockout matches decided on penalty kicks.

=== Africa Women Cup of Nations ===
Africa Women Cup of Nations record									Qualification					
Year	Round	Position	Pld	W	D*	L	GF	GA	Pld	W	D	L	GF	GA
1991	did not exist								did not exist					
1995	did not exist								did not exist					
(Nigeria) 1998	did not exist								did not exist					
(South Africa) 2000	did not exist								did not exist					
(Nigeria) 2002	did not exist								did not exist					
(South Africa) 2004	did not exist								did not exist					
(Nigeria) 2006	did not enter								did not enter					
(Equatorial Guinea) 2008	did not enter								did not enter					
(South Africa) 2010	did not enter								did not enter					
(Equatorial Guinea) 2012	did not enter								did not enter					
(Namibia) 2014	did not enter								did not enter					
(Cameroon) 2016	did not qualify								2	0	0	2	0	11
(Ghana) 2018	did not enter								did not enter					
2020	did not enter, tournament was later canceled								did not enter, tournament was later canceled					
(Morocco) 2022	did not enter								did not enter					
(Morocco) 2024	Did not qualify								2	0	0	2	0	11
(Morocco) 2026	did not enter								did not enter					
**Appearances**	**0/17**	–	–	–	–	–	–	–	**4**	**0**	**0**	**4**	**0**	**22**

=== African Games ===
African Games record
Year	Round	Position	Pld	W	D*	L	GS	GA
(Nigeria) 2003	did not exist							
(Algeria) 2007	did not enter							
(Mozambique) 2011	did not enter							
(Republic of the Congo) 2015	did not enter							
(Morocco) 2019	did not enter							
(Ghana) 2023	did not enter							
(Egypt) 2027	to be determined							
**Appearances**	**0/6**	–	–	–	–	–	–	–

=== COSAFA Women's Championship ===
COSAFA Women's Championship record
Year	Round	Position	Pld	W	D*	L	GS	GA
(Zimbabwe) 2002	did not exist							
(Zambia) 2006	did not enter							
(Angola) 2008	did not enter							
(Zimbabwe) 2011	did not enter							
(Zimbabwe) 2017	**Group stage**	12th	3	0	0	3	0	17
(South Africa) 2018	did not enter							
(South Africa) 2019	**Group stage**	11th	3	0	0	3	0	26
(South Africa) 2020	did not enter							
(South Africa) 2021	did not enter							
(South Africa) 2022	**Group stage**	11th	3	0	0	3	0	12
(South Africa) 2023	did not enter							
(South Africa) 2024	**Group stage**	11th	3	0	0	3	1	19
(South Africa) 2025	did not enter							
**Appearances**	**Group Stage**	**11th**	**12**	**0**	**0**	**12**	**1**	**74**

*Draws include knockout matches decided on penalty kicks.

== See also ==
- Sport in Mauritius
  - Football in Mauritius
- Mauritius men's national football team
