= Mary Mwakapila =

Zambian footballer (born 1995)

Personal information
- Date of birth: 5 June 1995 (age 31)
- Position: Midfielder

Senior career*
Years	Team	Apps	(Gls)
- Bauleni Sports Academy
- Hapoel Be'ersheba

International career^{‡}
- Zambia
- * Club domestic league appearances and goals ‡ National team caps and goals as of 11 October 2014 (before the 2014 African Women's Championship)

Mary Mwakapila (born 5 June 1995) is a Zambian footballer who plays as a midfielder for the Zambia women's national football team. She was part of the team at the 2014 African Women's Championship. On club level she played for Bauleni Sports Academy in Zambia.

== International goals ==
Scores and results list Zambia's goal tally first

No.	Date	Venue	Opponent	Score	Result	Competition
1	18 November 2018	Cape Coast Sports Stadium, Cape Coast, Ghana	Equatorial Guinea	4–0	5–0	2018 Africa Women Cup of Nations
2	2 October 2019	Nkoloma Stadium, Lusaka, Zambia	Botswana	1–0	1–0	2020 CAF Women's Olympic Qualifying Tournament – Third round
3	10 March 2020	Nkoloma Stadium, Lusaka, Zambia	Cameroon	1–0	–	2020 CAF Women's Olympic Qualifying Tournament – Fifth round
