= Grace Chanda =

Zambian footballer (born 1997)

Personal information
- Date of birth: 11 June 1997 (age 29)
- Place of birth: Kasama, Zambia
- Height: 1.60 m (5 ft 3 in)
- Position: Midfielder

Team information
- Current team: Querétaro
- Number: 10

Senior career*
Years	Team	Apps	(Gls)
2015–2020	ZESCO United	26+	(86+)
2021	Red Arrows	?	(35)
2022	BIIK Kazygurt	?	(?)
2022–2024	Madrid CFF	28	(4)
2024–2025	Orlando Pride	4	(0)
2026–	Querétaro	3	(0)

International career^{‡}
2014	Zambia U17	3	(1)
2018–	Zambia	31	(19)
Medal record
Representing Zambia
Women's Africa Cup of Nations
Third place	2022 Morocco
- * Club domestic league appearances and goals as of 5 February 2026 ‡ National team caps and goals as of 30 June 2023

Grace Chanda (born 11 June 1997) is a Zambian professional footballer who plays as a midfielder for Liga MX Femenil club Querétaro and the Zambia national team.

Chanda previously played in her native Zambia with ZESCO United and the Red Arrows, as well as in Kazakhstan with BIIK Kazygurt, in Spain for Madrid CFF, and in the United States for the Orlando Pride. She was one of three players shortlisted for African Women's Footballer of the Year in 2022.

== Club career ==
=== Early years ===
In 2018, Chanda scored 86 goals in 26 games for ZESCO United.

Ahead of the newly created FAZ Women's Super Division national championship in 2021, Chanda signed for Red Arrows. Red Arrows finished second behind Green Buffaloes but individually Chanda won the golden boot for the 2021 season, scoring 35 goals in total, and was named FAZ Women's Player of the Year.

=== BIIK Kazygurt, 2022 ===
In March 2022, Chanda signed with BIIK Kazygurt of the Kazakhstani Championship. On 18 August 2022, she scored a hat-trick on her UEFA Women's Champions League debut in a 5–1 victory over ŽNK Split during the 2022–23 UEFA Women's Champions League qualifying stage. She was the first Zambian women's footballer to do so.

=== Madrid CFF, 2022–2024 ===
On 3 September 2022, Chanda signed with Madrid CFF in Spain's top division Liga F on a two-year contract. She made her debut on 24 September during a 3–1 win against FC Levante Las Planas. In October, she scored a goal and provided an assist to help lift Madrid to a 4–0 win over Real Betis. During the team's match against Atlético Madrid, she scored the equalizer goal after subbing in at the half resulting in a 1–1 draw. She finished the 2022–23 season with three goals and two assists. Madrid finished in fifth place. Chanda spent the majority of the 2023–24 season sidelined having been taken ill at the 2023 FIFA Women's World Cup in July 2023. She remained in hospital in New Zealand throughout August, eventually returning to light training with Madrid in September although did not return to playing until May 2024.

=== Orlando Pride, 2024–2025 ===
On 30 May 2024, Orlando Pride of the National Women's Soccer League announced the signing of Chanda as a free agent until 2025 with an option for 2026. She was scheduled to join the club following the conclusion of the 2024 Paris Olympics. However, she was placed on the Season Ending Injury list in August after suffering a ruptured quadriceps tendon in her right leg while on international duty. Orlando filed a grievance with FIFA against the Football Association of Zambia for "failing to provide a reasonable standard of care for player health and safety" after Chanda was asked to continue training and playing during Zambia's opening match of the Olympics while injured.

After recovering from her injury, Chanda made her NWSL debut on 19 April 2025, coming on in a 1–0 loss to the Washington Spirit as a second-half substitute. On 2 September 2025, she recorded her first start with the Pride in a CONCACAF W Champions Cup match against Alajuelense. She made 7 appearances across all competitions in her tenure with Orlando before mutually departing from the club in January 2026.

=== Querétaro, 2026– ===
On 7 January 2026, Mexican club Querétaro announced that they had signed Chanda.

== International career ==
Chanda represented Zambia at the 2018 Africa Women Cup of Nations and 2022 Africa Women Cup of Nations.

Chanda was the top goalscorer with eight goals at the 2020 CAF Women's Olympic Qualifying Tournament, the Olympic-qualifying tournament for Africa and helped Zambia qualify for their first Olympics.

Chanda was one of three players shortlisted for African Women's Footballer of the Year in 2022.

On the eve of Zambia's FIFA Women's World Cup debut in July 2023, Chanda was ruled out of the tournament with illness.

On 3 July 2024, Chanda was called up to the Zambia squad for the 2024 Summer Olympics.

== Personal life ==
Chanda notes American striker Alex Morgan as a football idol.

== Career statistics ==
Scores and results list Zambia's goal tally first

No.	Date	Venue	Opponent	Score	Result	Competition
1	18 November 2018	Cape Coast Sports Stadium, Cape Coast, Ghana	Equatorial Guinea	1–0	5–0	2018 Africa Women Cup of Nations
2	28 August 2019	Nkoloma Stadium, Lusaka, Zambia	Zimbabwe	2–0	5–0	2020 CAF Women's Olympic Qualifying Tournament
3	28 August 2019	Nkoloma Stadium, Lusaka, Zambia	Zimbabwe	3–0	5–0	2020 CAF Women's Olympic Qualifying Tournament
4	28 August 2019	Nkoloma Stadium, Lusaka, Zambia	Zimbabwe	4–0	5–0	2020 CAF Women's Olympic Qualifying Tournament
5	8 October 2019	Francistown Stadium, Francistown, Botswana	Botswana	1–0	2–0	2020 CAF Women's Olympic Qualifying Tournament
6	8 October 2019	Francistown Stadium, Francistown, Botswana	Botswana	2–0	2–0	2020 CAF Women's Olympic Qualifying Tournament
7	8 November 2019	Moi International Sports Centre, Kasarani, Kenya	Kenya	1–0	2–2	2020 CAF Women's Olympic Qualifying Tournament
8	5 March 2020	Stade Ahmadou Ahidjo, Yaoundé, Cameroon	Cameroon	1–0	2–3	2020 CAF Women's Olympic Qualifying Tournament
9	5 March 2020	Stade Ahmadou Ahidjo, Yaoundé, Cameroon	Cameroon	2–2	2–3	2020 CAF Women's Olympic Qualifying Tournament
10	3 October 2021	Gelvandale Stadium, Gqeberha, South Africa	Namibia	2–0	3–0	2021 COSAFA Women's Championship
11	5 October 2021	Wolfson Stadium, Ibhayi, South Africa	Uganda	1–0	1–0	2021 COSAFA Women's Championship
12	7 October 2021	Wolfson Stadium, Ibhayi, South Africa	Tanzania	1–1	1–1 (2–3 p)	2021 COSAFA Women's Championship
13	20 October 2021	Bingu National Stadium, Lilongwe, Malawi	Malawi	1–0	1–1	2022 Women's Africa Cup of Nations qualification
14	18 June 2022	Prince Moulay Abdellah Stadium, Rabat, Morocco	Morocco	1–1	1–1	Friendly
15	9 July 2022	Stade Moulay Hassan, Rabat, Morocco	Togo	1–0	4–1	2022 Women's Africa Cup of Nations
16	9 July 2022	Stade Moulay Hassan, Rabat, Morocco	Togo	4–1	4–1	2022 Women's Africa Cup of Nations
17	15 February 2023	Gold City Sports Complex, Alanya, Turkey	North Macedonia	1–0	1–0	Friendly
18	21 February 2023	Miracle Sports Complex, Alanya, Turkey	Uzbekistan	1–0	4–0	2023 Turkish Women's Cup
19	30 June 2023	Tissot Arena, Biel/Bienne, Switzerland	Switzerland	1–1	3–3	Friendly

== Honours ==
BIIK Kazygurt

- Kazakhstani Championship: 2022

Orlando Pride

- NWSL Shield: 2024
- NWSL Championship: 2024

Zambia

- Women's Africa Cup of Nations third place: 2022

Individual

- Football Association of Zambia Women's Player of the Year: 2021
- FAZ Women's Super Division golden boot: 2021
- Women's Africa Cup of Nations Team of the Tournament: 2022
- IFFHS CAF Women's Team of The Year: 2022

== See also ==
- List of foreign Liga F players
