= Tiisetso Makhubela =

South African soccer player

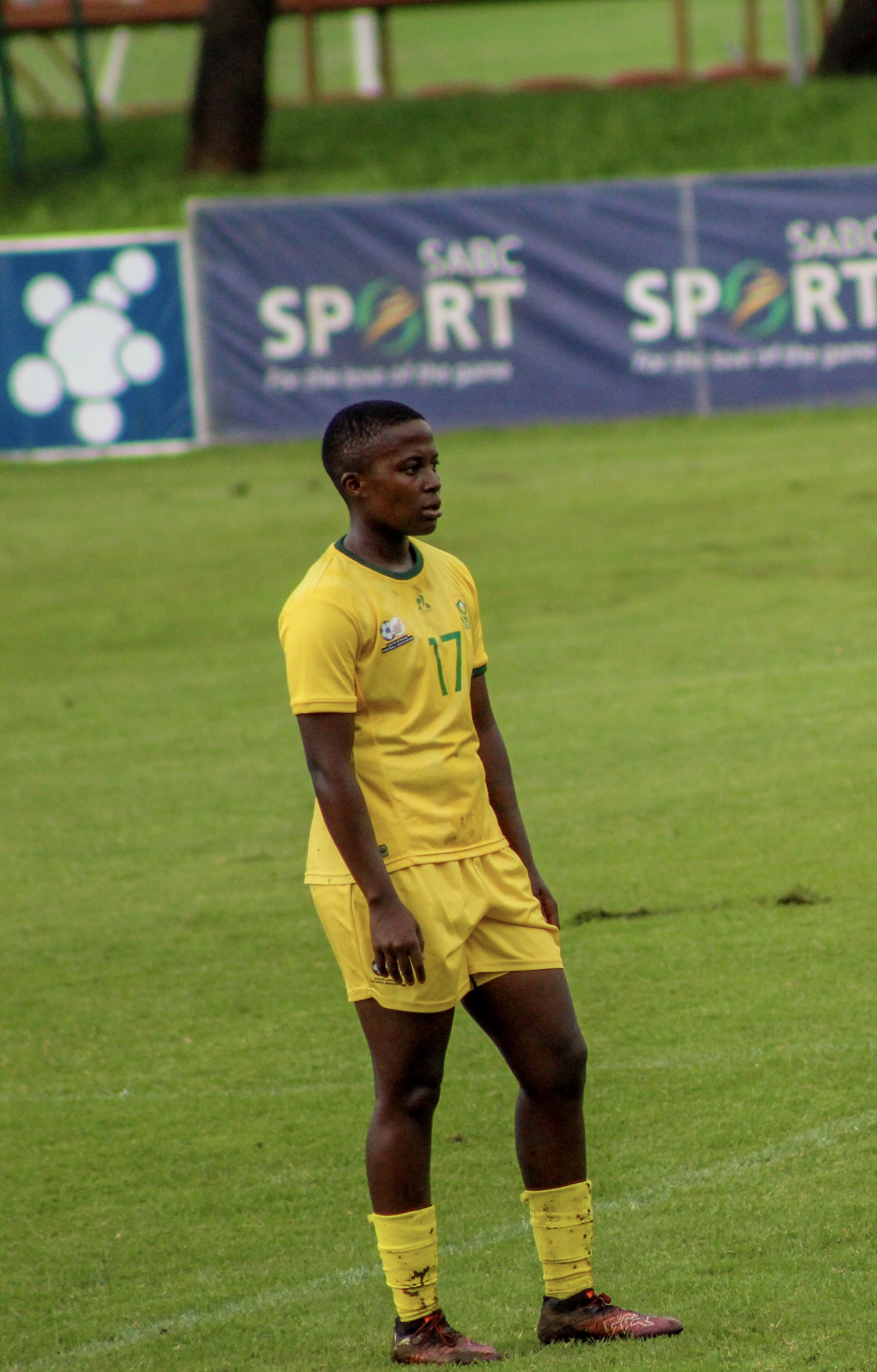
- Makhubela in 2025

Personal information
- Full name: Tiisetso Martha Makhubela
- Date of birth: 24 April 1997 (age 29)
- Place of birth: Mamelodi, South Africa
- Height: 1.61 m (5 ft 3 in)
- Position: Central midfielder

Team information
- Current team: Mamelodi Sundowns Ladies
- Number: 29

Senior career*
Years	Team	Apps	(Gls)
2021–	Mamelodi Sundowns Ladies		

International career^{‡}
2019–	South Africa	24	(2)
Medal record
Representing South Africa
Women's Africa Cup of Nations
Second place	2018 Ghana
First place	2022 Morocco
- * Club domestic league appearances and goals ‡ National team caps and goals as of 20 July 2023 (prior the 2023 FIFA Women's World Cup)

Tiisetso Martha Makhubela (born 24 April 1997) is a South African soccer player who plays as a central midfielder for SAFA Women's League club Mamelodi Sundowns and the South Africa women's national team.

== Club career ==
=== Mamelodi Sundowns Ladies ===
In 2021, she joined Mamelodi Sundowns in South Africa and was part of the team that were runner's up for the 2022 Cosafa Women's Champions League and the 2022 CAF Women's Champions League.

In 2023, she was part of the squad that won the 2023 COSAFA Women's Champions League.

== International career ==
Makhubela was part of the South African women's national team at the 2018 Africa Women Cup of Nations where they finished in second place.

In 2019, she represented the country at the 2019 FIFA Women's World Cup in France.

She was part of the South African women's national team at 2022 Women's Africa Cup of Nations where they won their first continental title in Morocco.

In 2023, she was part of the Banyana Banyana squad that reached the last 16 at the 2023 FIFA Women's World Cup.

== Honours ==
South Africa

- Women's Africa Cup of Nations: 2022, runner-up: 2018

Club

Mamelodi Sundowns

- SAFA Women's League: 2021, 2022, 2023
- CAF Women's Champions League: runner-up: 2022
- COSAFA Women's Champions League: 2023 runner-up: 2022
