= Ode Fulutudilu =

South African soccer player (born 1990)

Personal information
- Date of birth: 6 February 1990 (age 36)
- Place of birth: Kinshasa, Zaire
- Position: Forward

College career
Years	Team	Apps	(Gls)
2010–2013	Lee Flames	19	(4)

Senior career*
Years	Team	Apps	(Gls)
- Lolvido Rapids
- AIS
- Cape Town Angels
- Spurs Ladies
2018	ONS	22	(15)
2019	Málaga	10	(1)
2020	Åland United	16	(7)
2021–2022	Glasgow City	10	(7)
2022–2023	FC Fleury 91	10	(1)
2023	Real Betis	10	(0)

International career^{‡}
2014–2019	South Africa	10	(1)
- * Club domestic league appearances and goals as of 15 March 2023 ‡ National team caps and goals as of 11 October 2014

Ode Fulutudilu (born 6 February 1990) is a professional former soccer player who plays as a forward. She has previously played for clubs in South Africa, Finland, Spain, Scotland, and France. She made her debut for South Africa in 2014 and was a member of their 2019 FIFA Women's World Cup squad. Born in Zaire, she and her family initially arrived in South Africa as refugees.

== Early life ==
Ode Fulutudilu was born in Kinshasa, Zaire, on 6 February 1990. When she was three years old, her family left the country due to unrest and went to neighbouring Angola as refugees, before moving on to Cape Town in South Africa the following year. Fulutudilu's father was unable to find work in South Africa and eventually returned to Angola, but left her behind as he felt she would have a better future there. She subsequently grew up in a children's home. Having become interested in football when she watched the South Africa men's national team playing in the 1998 World Cup, she joined her first organised girls' team. Through this she met a British volunteer (Joelle Holland) who subsequently became her foster mother, and was instrumental in her getting a scholarship to study in the United States at Lee University in Cleveland, Tennessee.

== College career ==
Fulutudilu spent four years playing college soccer for the Lee Flames, the athletic team of Lee University, winning three regular season titles and two national titles.

== Club career ==
When she signed with Málaga in 2019, she became the first South African to play in the top tier of Spanish women's football.

In January 2021, she left Finland to sign with Glasgow City in Scotland, joining fellow South African Janine van Wyk. However, due to COVID-19-related limits on football, she was not able to make her debut for the team until April. She would score hat-tricks in both her debut and second matches for Glasgow.

In February 2023, Fulutudilu returned to Spain, joining Liga F club Real Betis.

== International career ==
She played for the Banyana Banyana at the 2014 African Women's Championship She also represented South Africa at the 2019 World Cup, the country's first appearance in the tournament finals.

== Personal life ==
Fulutudilu has a bachelor's degree in sociology from Lee University.
