= Busisiwe Ndimeni =

South African footballer

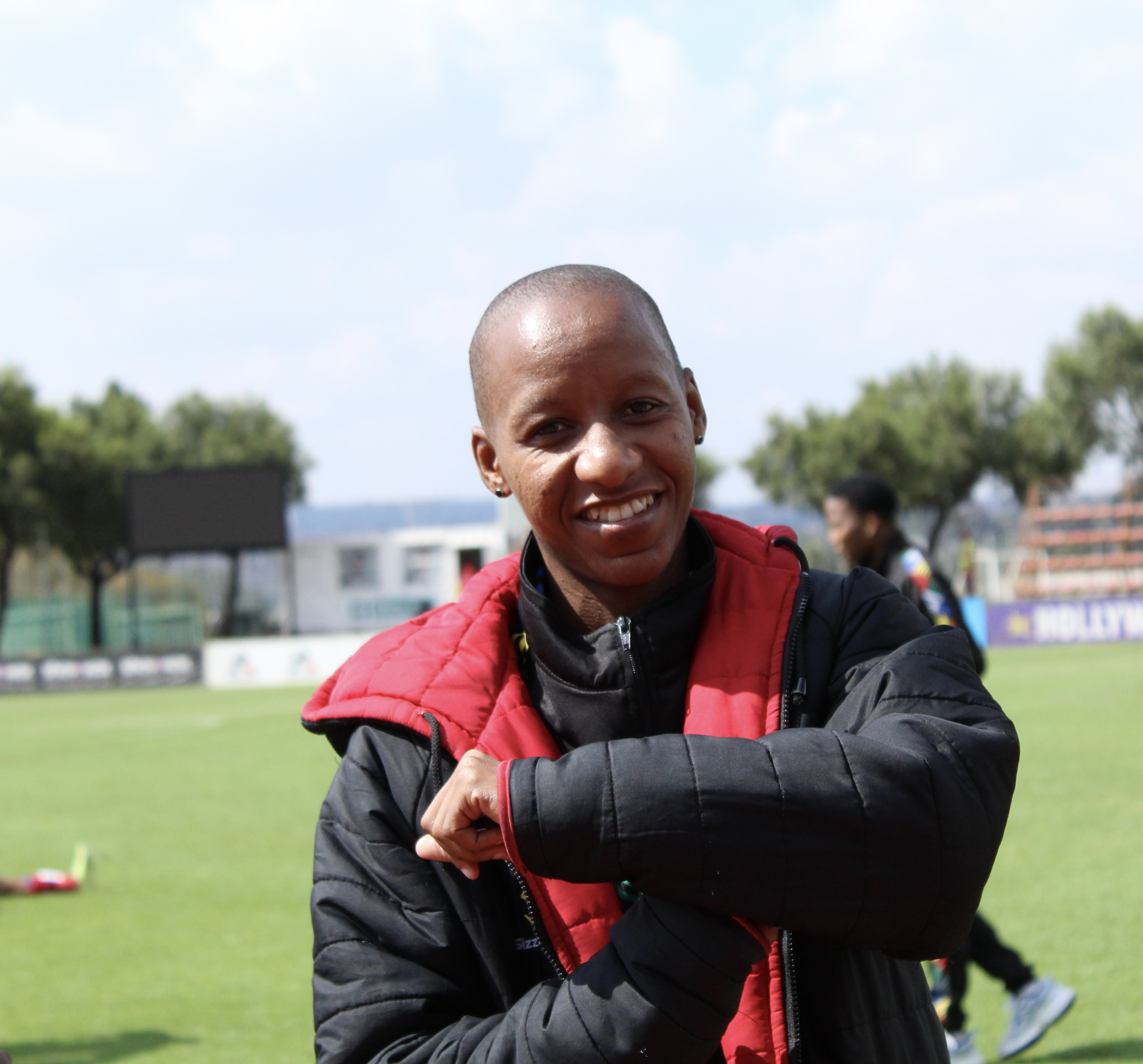
- Ndimeni in 2025

Personal information
- Date of birth: 25 June 1991 (age 35)
- Height: 1.58 m (5 ft 2 in)
- Position: Forward

Senior career*
| Years | Team | Apps | (Gls) |
| – | Mamelodi Sundowns Ladies | | |
| 2010–2011 | Zvezda-2005 Perm | 3 | (0) |
| 2014–2023 | Tshwane University of Technology | 29 | (17) |
| 2023–2025 | TS Galaxy Queens | 81 | (23) |

International career^{‡}
| 2018–2025 | South Africa | 9 | (0) |
- * Club domestic league appearances and goals as of 27 March 2026 ‡ National team caps and goals as of 01:38, 9 June 2019 (UTC)

Busisiwe Ndimeni (born 25 June 1991) is a former South African footballer who played as a forward.

She was part of the South Africa women's national team when they made their debut at the FIFA Women's World Cup in 2019 and was the 2013 Sasol League National Championship diski queen of the tournament (best player).

== Club career ==
Mamelodi Sundowns Ladies

Ndimeni won the 2013 Sasol League National Championship with Mamelodi Sundowns Ladies and won the Diski Queen of the Tournament.

Zvezda-2005 Perm

She signed for Russian Women's Football Championship side Zvezda-2005 Perm and made a start the goalless draw against Olympique Lyonnais in the 2011–12 UEFA Women's Champions League.

Tshwane Uninversity of Technology

She played for Tshwane University of Technology and was part of the squad that won the Women's Varsity Football tournament from 2014–2017.

TS Galaxy Queens

Ndimeni made 81 appeareances for TS Galaxy Queens and scored 23 goals from 2023–2025.

== International career ==
She competed for the South Africa women's national team at the 2019 FIFA Women's World Cup.

== Honours ==
South Africa

- Women's Africa Cup of Nations runners-up: 2018

Tshwane Uninversity of Technology

- Sasol League National Championship: 2018
- Women's Varsity Football: 2014, 2015, 2016, 2017

Individual

- 2013 Sasol League National Championship: Diski Queen of the Tournament
