= Isaac Wolfson Stadium =

Sports stadium in KwaZakele, South Africa

Wolfson Stadium
- The Holy Ground
- Interactive map of Wolfson Stadium
- Full name: Isaac Wolfson Sports Stadium
- Location: KwaZakele, Ibhayi South Africa
- Coordinates: 33.884463°S 25.595285°E
- Capacity: 10,000
- Record attendance: 15,000 (disputed) (Banyana Banyana v Zambia 2022 COSAFA Women's Championship, 11 September 2022)

The Wolfson Stadium is a sports stadium in KwaZakele, Ibhayi just outside Port Elizabeth in South Africa. The stadium is able to hold 10,000 people. and is occasionally used to host rugby union matches by the Eastern Province Elephants and Southern Kings and football matches by Chippa United.

The regular tenants of the stadium are Chippa United Reserves, Peacemakers Football Club, and amateur rugby clubs and schools.

It was also the home of the now-defunct football team Bay United F.C.
