= Gelvandale Stadium =

Sports venue in Port Elizabeth, South Africa

- Interactive map of Gelvandale Stadium
- Location: Liebenberg Road, Gelvandale, Port Elizabeth, South Africa
- Coordinates: 33.914°S 25.560°E
- Owner: Nelson Mandela Bay Municipality
- Capacity: 3,000
- Surface: Grass

Construction
- Opened: March 2010
- Cost: R68 million

Tenants
- Bay United(2010 - 2011); Bay Stars (2011 - 2013)

Gelvandale Stadium is a multi-use stadium located in Port Elizabeth, South Africa. The stadium is equipped with an athletics track, football pitch and floodlights. It is currently used mostly as a community sports ground, and by local amateur football club Swallows.

It is currently used as a part-time home ground for East London based National First Division side, Blackburn Rovers. The stadium was previously used for professional football matches, as the home ground of National First Division club, Bay United. After the relocation of Bay United, it was used as the home ground of Bay Stars in the SAFA Second Division.

It was also utilized as a training field for teams participating in the 2010 FIFA World Cup and 2013 Africa Cup of Nations, after being built and opened in March 2010. It was one of Port Elizabeth's two training venues, along with the Nelson Mandela Metropolitan University Stadium. These training venues were used by the 2010 World Cup participants for practices, practice matches and other training, before their games at the city's Nelson Mandela Bay Stadium.
