= 2025 COSAFA Women's Championship final =

Final of the 13th edition of the COSAFA Women's Championship

COSAFA Women's Championship 2025 final
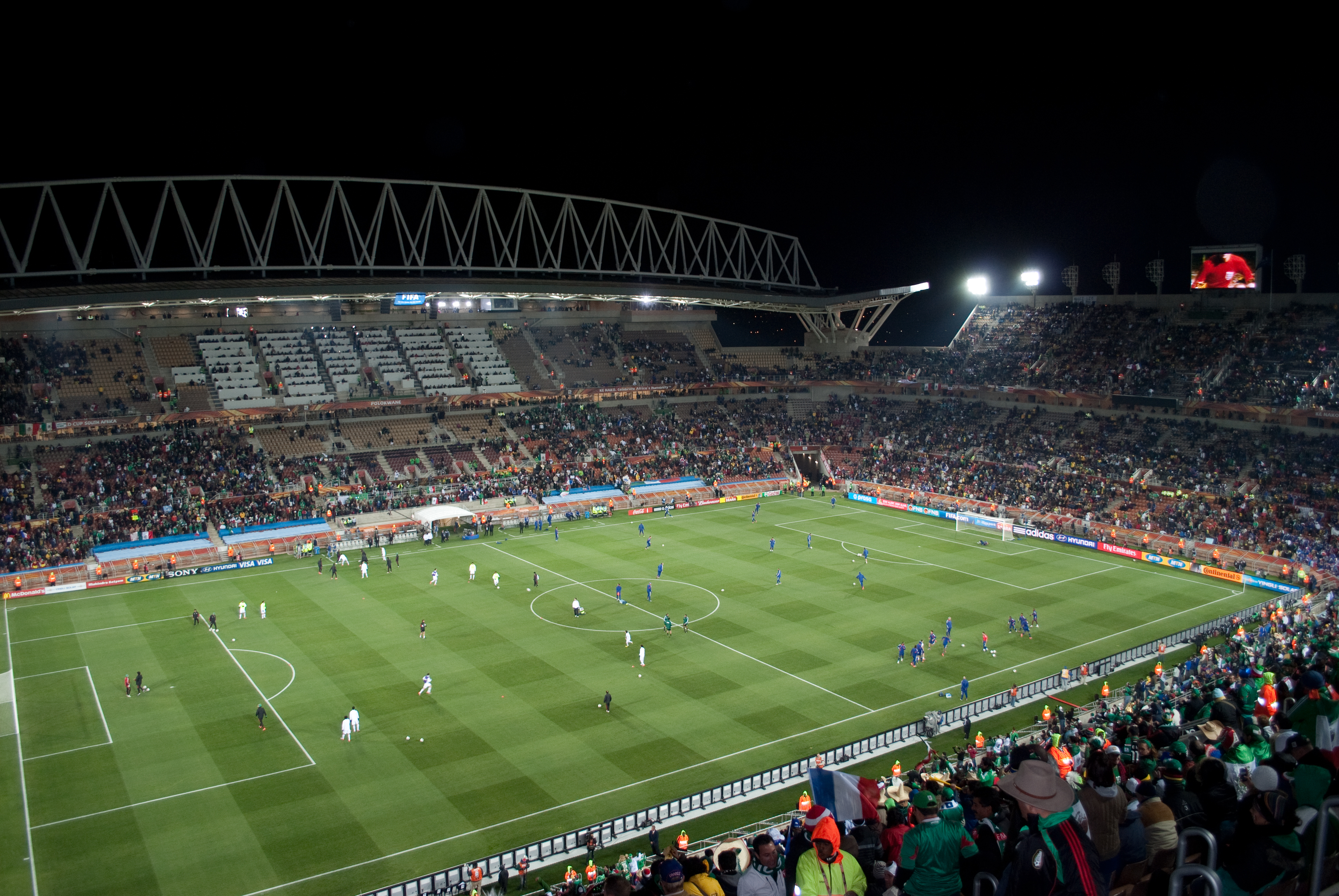
- Peter Mokaba Stadium in Polokwane hosted the final
- Event: 2025 COSAFA Women's Championship
Namibia	South Africa
2	1
- After extra time
- Date: 1 March 2026
- Venue: Peter Mokaba Stadium, Polokwane
- Player of the Match: Zenatha Coleman (Namibia)
- Referee: Rose Zimba (Malawi)
- Weather: Haze; 30 °C (86 °F); 37% humidity

The 2025 COSAFA Women's Championship final was a football match held on 1 March 2026 at the New Peter Mokaba Stadium in Polokwane, South Africa, between hosts and seven-times winners South Africa and Namibia to determine the winners of the 2025 COSAFA Women's Championship. It was the thirteenth final of the COSAFA Women's Championship, a tournament contested by the senior national teams of the member associations of COSAFA to decide the champions of Southern Africa. After a 1–1 draw in regular time, Namibia found the breakthrough early in extra time, as Memory Ngonda struck in the second minute of extra time. Her goal proved decisive, sealing a long-awaited measure of revenge two decades on and securing Namibia's first-ever title.

== Background ==
The final was a replay of the 2006 decider, when South Africa defeated Namibia 3–1 to secure their second title.

For Namibia, this marked their second final appearance, coming 20 years after their first. They have progressed beyond the group stage twice in their last eight participations, excluding the 2006 edition.

In contrast, South Africa have been regular finalists and contested their 11th final. They have won the title on seven occasions and finished runners-up three times, and were seeking to end a title drought dating back to their most recent triumph in 2020. Banyana Banyana were aiming to lift their eighth title.

This was the sixth meeting between the two sides in the tournament, having previously faced each other five times, all of which were won by South Africa, who have scored 10 goals to Namibia's three. Their first encounter came in the 2006 final, while the most recent meeting occurred in the previous edition's group stage, where South Africa recorded a 1–0 victory courtesy of a strike from Tshogofatso Motlogelwa.

== Route to the final ==
=== Namibia ===
Namibia's route to the final
Match	Opponent	Result
1	Mozambique	2–0
2	Madagascar	0–1
SF	Zambia	1–0

Drawn into Group C alongside Madagascar and Mozambique, the only three-team group of this edition, Namibia opened their tournament in style, defeating Mozambique 2–0 at the Old Peter Mokaba Stadium. However, entering their second match as favorites, Namibia were upset by Madagascar, who defeated them 1–0 in the first international meeting between the two sides. On the third matchday, Mozambique beat Madagascar 2–0, which saw Namibia qualify as group winners due to a superior goal difference among the three teams, setting up a semi-final clash against Group B winners Zambia.

In the semi-final, Namibia held Zambia at bay throughout the match before stunning the defending champions in the 90th minute, when Juliana Blou converted a Coleman assist to give the Brave Gladiators their second ever victory against the Copper Queens.

=== South Africa ===
South Africa's route to the final
Match	Opponent	Result
1	Malawi	2–0
2	Angola	2–0
3	Lesotho	1–1
SF	Zimbabwe	1–1 (4–2 p)

Hosts Banyana Banyana were automatically drawn into Group A and kicked off their campaign with a 2–0 victory over 2023 champions Malawi at the Old Peter Mokaba Stadium. They repeated the same scoreline three days later against Angola at Seshego Stadium, securing qualification for the semi-finals with one match to spare. In their final group fixture, South Africa were held to a 1–1 draw by bottom-placed Lesotho. As Group A winners, they advanced to face best runners-up Zimbabwe.

In the semi-final, South Africa came from behind after Zimbabwe had opened the scoring in the 11th minute, equalizing in the 39th minute. The match finished 1–1 after regulation time, with South Africa prevailing 4–2 in the penalty shoot-out to book their second consecutive final and 11th overall.

== Match ==
=== Summary ===
A repeat of the 2006 final won by South Africa, the decider unfolded as a tightly contested encounter, with both teams adopting a cautious approach in the early exchanges and limiting clear-cut chances before the interval. South Africa came closest in the opening half when Mokoma rattled the crossbar with a speculative effort from distance. The deadlock was eventually broken just after the half-hour mark, as Majiya finished from close range following an assist by Sinegugu Zondi, registering her second goal of the tournament to hand Banyana Banyana the advantage at the break.

Namibia emerged with greater urgency in the second half. Substitute Millicent Hikuam tested the defence with an attempt from outside the area, though her effort drifted wide. Coleman then threatened twice in quick succession, first firing over and later forcing goalkeeper Casey Gordon into a decisive goal-line intervention from a set piece. The equaliser arrived nine minutes after the restart, when substitute Hanavi capitalised on Gordon's advanced position to score with a long-range strike, restoring parity and shifting the momentum.

The contest opened up thereafter, with both sides committing numbers forward in search of a winner. Mphelo was denied late in regulation time by the Namibian goalkeeper, while Ngonda's attempt at the other end was comfortably dealt with, sending the final into extra time.

Namibia struck early in the additional period, as Ngonda converted from a Coleman assist inside the opening two minutes to turn the match in her side's favour. South Africa pressed in the closing stages and came close to forcing a penalty shoot-out, but substitute Salgado saw her effort come back off the woodwork, confirming Namibia's triumph at the final whistle.

=== Details ===
1 March 2026
15:00

Namibia	2–1 (a.e.t.)	South Africa
Hanavi 54'; Ngonda 92'	Report	Majiya 37'

New Peter Mokaba Stadium, Polokwane
Referee: Rose Zimba (Malawi)

Namibia	South Africa

Formation: 4–2–3–1
GK	23	Melissa Matheus	(yellow card) 110'
LB	3	Iina Katuta
CB	20	Lovisa Mulunga (c)
CB	6	Utuzuvira Kahiriri
RB	2	Unondjamo Kaetjavi
CM	7	Twelikondjela Amukoto	(yellow card) 27'	(substituted off) 46'
CM	21	Asteria Angula
LW	14	Ivone Kooper		(substituted off) 65'
AM	8	Zenatha Coleman
RW	18	Juliana Blou		(substituted off) 84'
CF	11	Leena Alweendo		(substituted off) 46'
Substitutions:
MF	10	Millicent Hikuam		(substituted on) 46'
FW	13	Muhinatjo Hanavi		(substituted on) 46'
FW	22	Nancy Lebang		(substituted on) 65'
MF	17	Memory Ngonda		(substituted on) 84'
Manager:
Lesley Kakuva

Formation: 4–4–2
GK	16	Casey Gordon
RB	20	Antonia Maponya
CB	15	Khutso Pila
CB	3	Shakira O'Malley		(substituted off) 97'
LB	19	Sinegugu Zondi
LM	22	Sibongakonke Mzobe		(substituted off) 57'
CM	7	Lonathemba Mhlongo
CM	14	Nonhlanhla Mthandi (c)	(yellow card) 64'	(substituted off) 86'
RM	6	Bongiwe Thusi		(substituted off) 57'
CF	23	Nthabiseng Majiya		(substituted off) 86'
CF	13	Bonolo Mokoma	(yellow card) 45+3'	(substituted off) 71'
Substitutions:
MF	8	Thorisho Mphelo		(substituted on) 57'
MF	17	Isabella Ludwig		(substituted on) 57'
DF	2	Asanda Hadebe		(substituted on) 71'
MF	4	Regina Mogolola		(substituted on) 86'
MF	10	Zoe October		(substituted on) 86'
MF	9	Gabriela Salgado		(substituted on) 97'
Manager:
Desiree Ellis

Player of the Match:
Zenatha Coleman (Namibia)

Assistant referees:
Claris Simango (Zimbabwe)
Happiness Mbandambanda (Malawi)
Fourth official:
Anna Banda (Zambia)

Match rules

- 90 minutes
- 30 minutes of extra time if necessary
- Penalty shoot-out if scores still level
- Maximum of twelve named substitutes
- Maximum of five substitutions, with a sixth allowed in extra time
- Maximum of three substitution opportunities, with a fourth allowed in extra time

== Post-match ==
=== Milestone ===
Namibia became the sixth nation overall (and the fifth among COSAFA members) to lift the trophy. In doing so, they secured their maiden women's football title and their third COSAFA honour, following the men's triumph in 2015 and the under-17 success in 2016.

After the final match, Namibia's star and the final Player of the Match, Zenatha Coleman, announced that she will no longer take part in future COSAFA tournaments following Namibia's triumph. She stated that, after lifting the trophy in her sixth COSAFA appearance, she wished to make way for the next generation.

=== Recognition ===
The Namibian team were congratulated in a message from the President of Namibia Netumbo Nandi-Ndaitwah.

On 2 March 2026, a celebratory reception was held at Hosea Kutako International Airport, where supporters, officials, and well-wishers gathered to honour the national women's team in recognition of their outstanding achievement. The following day, the Brave Gladiators were received by the President at State House in further acknowledgement of their accomplishment.
