= Thomalina Adams =

Namibian footballer (born 1993)

Personal information
- Full name: Thomalina Azania Adams
- Date of birth: 6 July 1993 (age 33)
- Place of birth: Lüderitz, Namibia
- Height: 1.55 m (5 ft 1 in)
- Position: Midfielder

Team information
- Current team: Tura Magic

Youth career
- 2008–2010: Buchter Girls

Senior career*
Years	Team	Apps	(Gls)
2010–2011	Okahandja Beauties		
2011–2012	Germania Hauenhorst	9	(2)
2012–2013	unknown		
2013–2014	VfL Bochum II	3	(1)
2013–2014	VfL Bochum	13	(0)
2014–2016	Tura Magic		
2016	Gintra Universitetas		
2017–	Tura Magic		

International career
2010–	Namibia		
Medal record
Okahandja Beauties
Runner-up	Super League	2011–12
Germania Hauenhorst
Runner-up	Verbandsliga Westfalen	2011–12
Tura Magic
Winner	Super League	2015–16
Gintra Universitetas
Winner	A Lyga	2016
Winner	Lithuanian Cup	2016
Winner	Lithuanian Supercup	2016
Tura Magic
Winner	Super League	2018–19
- * Club domestic league appearances and goals

Thomalina Azania Adams (born 6 July 1993) is a Namibian footballer who plays as a midfielder for Namibia Women's Super League club Tura Magic FC and the Namibia women's national team.

== Club career ==
In 2011 Adams and Uerikondjera Kasaona joined Germania Hauenhorst to play in the 2011–12 Verbandsliga Westfalen season. Adams spent the 2012–13 season in Namibia without playing experience as the Super League did not resume until 2015. In 2013 Adams returned to Germany to play for the VfL Bochum in the 2013–14 2. Bundesliga season.

In 2016 Adams and Zenatha Coleman joined to Gintra Universitetas.

== Career statistics ==
Club	Season	League			Cup		Continental		Other		Total	
Club	Season	Division	Apps	Goals	Apps	Goals	Apps	Goals	Apps	Goals	Apps	Goals
Okahandja Beauties	2011–12	Super League			—		—		—			
Germania Hauenhorst	2011–12	Verbandsliga Westfalen	9	2	—		—		—		9	2
VfL Bochum II	2013–14	Regionalliga West	3	1	—		—		—		3	1
VfL Bochum	2013–14	2. Bundesliga	13	0	2	0	—		—		15	0
Tura Magic	2015–16	Super League			—		—		—			
Gintra Universitetas	2016	A Lyga					3	0	(Note: Appearances in the 2016 Lithuanian Supercup.)			
Tura Magic	2018–19	Super League			—		—		—			
Career total							3	0				

== International career ==
Adams is a member of the Namibia women's national football team. She was part of the Namibian team at the 2014 African Women's Championship.
