= Namibia women's national football team =

Women's national association football team representing Namibia

Namibia
- Nickname: Brave Gladiators
- Association: Namibia Football Association (NFA)
- Confederation: CAF (Africa)
- Sub-confederation: COSAFA (Southern Africa)
- Head coach: Uerikondjera Kasaona
- Captain: Zenatha Coleman
- FIFA code: NAM
First colours	Second colours

FIFA ranking
- Current: 125 ▼1 (16 June 2026)
- Highest: 89 (December 2009)
- Lowest: 147 (October 2022 – March 2023)

First international
- South Africa 13–0 Namibia (Pretoria, South Africa; 25 October 2003)

Biggest win
- Namibia 8–0 Mauritius (Port Elizabeth, South Africa; 6 August 2019)

Biggest defeat
- South Africa 13–0 Namibia (Pretoria, South Africa; 25 October 2003)

African Women's Championship
- Appearances: 1 (first in 2014)
- Best result: Group stage (2014)

COSAFA Women's Championship
- Appearances: 9 (first in 2006)
- Best result: (gold) Champions (2025)

The Namibia women's national football team, nicknamed the Brave Gladiators, is the senior national women's football team of Namibia and is overseen by the Namibia Football Association.

== History ==
The Brave Gladiators have made it to two COSAFA Women's Championships finals and won their maiden trophy in 2025.

They made their African Women's Championship debut as hosts in the 2014 African Women's Championship.

== Results and fixtures ==
The following is a list of match results in the last 12 months, as well as any future matches that have been scheduled.

Legend

Win Draw Lose Fixture

=== 2026 ===
20 February 2026 2025 COSAFA Women's Championship	Mozambique	0–2	Namibia	Old Peter Mokaba Stadium, Polokwane
15:00		Report	Alweendo 2'; Hikuam 78'	Referee: Élodie Livaharivony (Madagascar)

23 February 2026 2025 COSAFA Women's Championship	Namibia	0–1	Madagascar	Seshego Stadium, Seshego
15:00		Report	Razanampiavy 24'	Referee: Hloniphile Msezane (South Africa)

27 February 2026 2025 COSAFA SF	Zambia	0–1	Namibia	New Peter Mokaba Stadium, Polokwane
12:00		Report	Blou 90'	Referee: Nonjabulo Ndlela (South Africa)

1 March 2026 2025 COSAFA Women's Championship final	Namibia	2–1 (a.e.t.)	South Africa	New Peter Mokaba Stadium, Polokwane
15:00	Hanavi 54'; Ngonda 92'	Report	Majiya 37'	Referee: Rose Zimba (Malawi)

26 September Friendly	Botswana	1–1	Namibia
15:00		Report

29 September Friendly	Botswana	4–1	Namibia
11:30		Report

9 October 2026 2028 Olympic Qualification 2nd round	Angola	0–0	Namibia	Talatona, Angola
16:00 UTC+1		Report		Stadium: 11 November Stadium; Referee: Leticia Kenga (Central African Republic)

12 October 2026 2028 Olympic Qualification 2nd round	Namibia	0–2 (0–2 agg.)	Angola	Talatona, Angola
16:00 UTC+2		Report	Luís 35'; Da Silva 65' (pen.)	Stadium: 11 November Stadium; Referee: Emmanuela Akoo (South Sudan)

== Coaching staff ==
=== Current coaching staff ===
As of July 2026

Position	Name	Ref.
Head coach	Lucky Kakuva	

=== Manager history ===
- Uerikondjera Kasaona (????–2022)
- Paulus Shipanga(2022-2024)
- Nicolas Woody Jacobs(2024-)

== Players ==
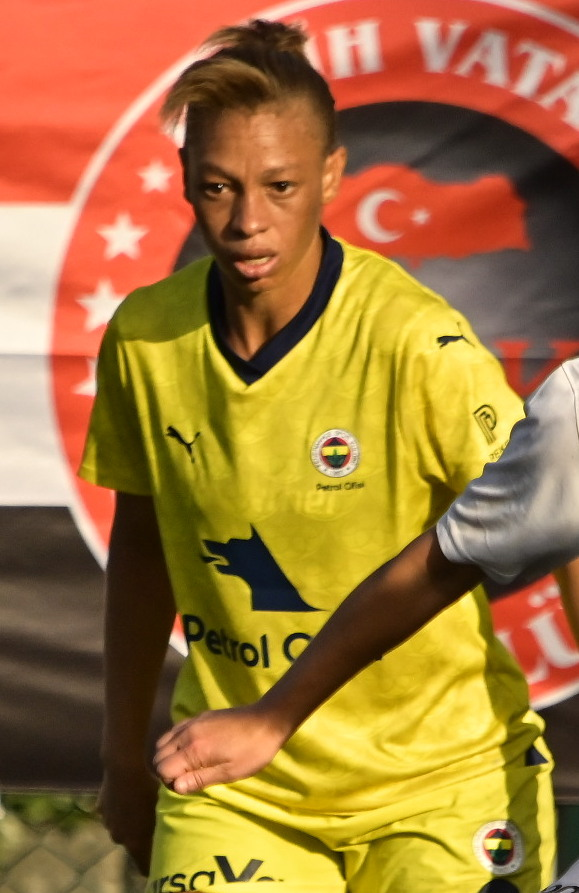
Zenatha Coleman played numerous games for Namibia

=== Current squad ===
- The following is the squad called up for the 2025 COSAFA Women's Championship on February 2026.

No.	Pos.	Player	Date of birth (age)	Club
1	GK	Tunga Ndiweteko	8 August 2009 (aged 16)	(Namibia Football Association) Arrows Ladies
2	DF	Unondjamo Kaetjavi	5 August 2007 (aged 18)	(Namibia Football Association) Mighty Gunners
3	DF	Iina Katuta	16 December 1986 (aged 39)	(Namibia Football Association) Khomas NAMPOL
4	DF	Julia Rutjindo	18 April 2000 (aged 25)	(Namibia Football Association) Ongos Ladies
5	DF	Emma Naris	8 November 1996 (aged 29)	(Namibia Football Association) Ongos Ladies
6	DF	Utuzuvira Kahiriri	2 December 2004 (aged 21)	(Namibia Football Association) Mighty Gunners
7	DF	Twelikondjela Amukoto	28 July 1991 (aged 34)	(Namibia Football Association) Khomas NAMPOL
8	MF	Zenatha Coleman	25 September 1993 (aged 32)	(Cyprus Turkish Football Association) Doğan Türk Birliği
9	MF	Kylie Van Wyk	1 May 1999 (aged 26)	(Namibia Football Association) Julinho Athletic
10	MF	Millicent Hikuam	6 July 1998 (aged 27)	(Namibia Football Association) Mighty Gunners
11	FW	Leena Alweendo	19 July 2005 (aged 20)	(Namibia Football Association) Mighty Gunners
12	FW	Beverly Uueziua	26 May 1999 (aged 26)	(Namibia Football Association) Julinho Athletic
13	FW	Muhinatjo Hanavi	11 February 2003 (aged 23)	(Namibia Football Association) UNAM Bokkies
14	FW	Ivone Kooper	16 January 1999 (aged 27)	(Namibia Football Association) Ongos Ladies
15	MF	Senoritha Aochamus	3 August 2007 (aged 18)	(Namibia Football Association) Windhoek City Girls
16	GK	Agnes Kauzuu	22 December 1992 (aged 33)	(Namibia Football Association) Ongos Ladies
17	MF	Memory Ngonda	11 February 1998 (aged 28)	(Namibia Football Association) Ongos Ladies
18	FW	Juliana Blou	19 May 1995 (aged 30)	(Namibia Football Association) Ongos Ladies
19	DF	Lorraine Jossob	4 May 1993 (aged 32)	(Namibia Football Association) Mighty Gunners
20	DF	Lovisa Mulunga (Captain)	18 March 1995 (aged 30)	(Namibia Football Association) Ongos Ladies
21	MF	Asteria Angula	11 June 1999 (aged 26)	(Namibia Football Association) Julinho Athletic
22	FW	Nancy Lebang	12 February 2009 (aged 17)	(Namibia Football Association) V-Power Angels
23	GK	Melissa Matheus	14 June 1998 (aged 27)	(Namibia Football Association) Mighty Gunners

=== Recent call-ups ===
The following players have been called up to a Namibia squad in the past 12 months.

Pos.	Player	Date of birth (age)	Caps	Goals	Club	Latest call-up
GK	Lydia Eixas				(Namibia)	v. Zambia, 26 October 2025
GK	Joyce Narises				(Namibia) WHK City FC	v. Zambia, 26 October 2025
DF	Lydiana Nanamus				(Namibia) Ongos SC	v. Zambia, 26 October 2025
MF	Hilma Kanyama				(Namibia) Ongwediva Queens	v. Zambia, 26 October 2025
MF	Thomalina Adams				(Namibia)	v. Zambia, 26 October 2025
FW	Veweziwa Kotjipati				(Namibia)	v. Zambia, 26 October 2025

=== Previous squads ===
COSAFA Women's Championship

- 2022 COSAFA Women's Championship squad
- 2023 COSAFA Women's Championship squad

== Records ==
- Active players in **bold**, statistics correct as of 2020.

=== Most capped players ===
#	Player	Year(s)	Caps

=== Top goalscorers ===
#	Player	Year(s)	Goals	Caps

== Honours ==
=== Regional ===
- **COSAFA Women's Championship**

Runners-up: 2006

== Competitive record ==
=== FIFA Women's World Cup ===
FIFA Women's World Cup record
Year	Result	Matches	Wins	Draws	Losses	GF	GA
(China) 1991	Did not enter						
(Sweden) 1995	Did not enter						
(United States) 1999	Did not enter						
(United States) 2003	Did not enter						
(China) 2007	Did not qualify						
(Germany) 2011	Did not qualify						
(Canada) 2015	Did not qualify						
(France) 2019	Did not qualify						
(Australia) (New Zealand) 2023	Did not qualify						
(Brazil) 2027	Did not qualify						
**Total**	0/10	0	0	0	0	0	0

=== Olympic Games ===
Summer Olympics record
Year	Result	Matches	Wins	Draws	Losses	GF	GA
(United States) 1996	Did not enter						
(Australia) 2000	Did not enter						
(Greece) 2004	Did not enter						
(China) 2008	Did not enter						
(United Kingdom) 2012	Did not qualify						
(Brazil) 2016	Did not qualify						
(Japan) 2021	Did not qualify						
Total	0/7	0	0	0	0	0	0

=== Africa Women Cup of Nations ===
Africa Women Cup of Nations record
Year	Result	Matches	Wins	Draws	Losses	GF	GA
1991	Did not enter						
1995	Did not enter						
(Nigeria) 1998	Withdrew						
(South Africa) 2000	Did not enter						
(Nigeria) 2002	Did not enter						
(South Africa) 2004	Did not enter						
(Nigeria) 2006	Did not qualify						
(Equatorial Guinea) 2008	Did not qualify						
(South Africa) 2010	Did not qualify						
(Equatorial Guinea) 2012	Did not qualify						
(Namibia) 2014	Group stage	3	1	0	2	3	5
(Cameroon) 2016	Did not qualify						
(Ghana) 2018	Did not qualify						
2020	Cancelled						
(Morocco) 2022	Did not qualify						
(Morocco) 2024	Did not qualify						
Total	1/12	3	1	0	2	3	5

=== African Games ===
African Games record
Year	Result	Matches	Wins	Draws	Losses	GF	GA
(Nigeria) 2003	Did not enter						
(Algeria) 2007	Did not enter						
(Mozambique) 2011	Did not qualify						
(Republic of the Congo) 2015	Did not qualify						
(Morocco) 2019	See Namibia women's national under-20 football team						
(Ghana) 2023	See Namibia women's national under-20 football team						
(Egypt) 2027	to be determined						
Total	0/4	0	0	0	0	0	0

=== COSAFA Women's Championship ===
COSAFA Women's Championship record
Year	Round	Pld	W	D*	L	GS	GA	GD
(Zimbabwe) 2002	Did not enter							
(Zambia) 2006	**Runner-up**	3	1	1	1	4	6	−2
(Angola) 2008	Did not enter							
(Zimbabwe) 2011	Did not enter							
(Zimbabwe) 2017	**Group stage**	3	1	0	2	6	5	+1
(South Africa) 2018	**Group stage**	3	1	1	1	4	2	+2
(South Africa) 2019	**Group stage**	3	1	0	2	10	4	+6
(South Africa) 2020	Did not enter							
(South Africa) 2021	**Group stage**	3	1	1	1	1	3	−2
(South Africa) 2022	**4th**	5	2	0	2	8	6	+2
(South Africa) 2023	**Group stage**	3	1	1	1	3	3	0
(South Africa) 2024	**Group stage**	3	2	0	1	9	1	+8
(South Africa) 2025	**Champions**	4	3	0	4	3	1	+1
Total	Champions	25	11	4	9	40	25	+15

*Draws include knockout matches decided on penalty kicks.

== All−time record against FIFA recognized nations ==
The list shown below shows the Djibouti national football team all−time international record against opposing nations.
*As of xxxxxx after match against xxxx.

Key

Positive balance (more wins than losses)
Neutral balance (as many wins as losses)
Negative balance (more losses than wins)

Against	Pld	W	D	L	GF	GA	GD	Confederation

=== Record per opponent ===
*As ofxxxxx after match against xxxxx.

Key

Positive balance (more wins than losses)
Neutral balance (as many wins as losses)
Negative balance (more losses than wins)

The following table shows Djibouti's all-time official international record per opponent:

Opponent	Pld	W	D	L	GF	GA	GD	W%	Confederation
Total									—

== See also ==
- Sport in Namibia
  - Football in Namibia
    - Women's football in Namibia
- Namibia women's national under-20 football team
- Namibia women's national under-17 football team
- Namibia men's national football team
