= Angola women's national football team =

Women's national association football team representing Angola

Angola
- Nickname: Welwitschias
- Association: Angolan Football Federation
- Confederation: CAF (Africa)
- Sub-confederation: COSAFA (Southern Africa)
- Head coach: (Angola) Xavier Manuel Da Costa Chapanga
- Captain: Ary Papel
- Top scorer: Irene Gonçalves (33)
- Home stadium: Ombaka National Stadium
- FIFA code: ANG
First colours	Second colours

FIFA ranking
- Current: 155 (16 June 2026)
- Highest: 82 (December 2003)
- Lowest: 155 (December 2025)

First international
- South Africa 3–1 Angola (South Africa; 7 January 1995)

Biggest win
- Angola 5–0 Comoros (Pretoria, South Africa; 5 October 2023)

Biggest defeat
- Angola 0–6 Zambia (Luanda, Angola; 29 November 2023); Zambia 6–0 Angola (Lusaka, Zambia; 5 December 2023)

African Women's Championship
- Appearances: 2 (first in 1995)
- Best result: Semi-Finalist (1995)

COSAFA Women's Championship
- Appearances: 9 (first in 2006)
- Best result: (silver) Runners-Up (2008)

The Angola women's national football team represents Angola in international women's football and it is controlled by the Angolan Football Federation. Their best place on the FIFA Rankings was the 82nd place, in December 2003. The only tournaments that they qualified were the 1995 and 2002 African Women's Championships, and their best finish was as Semi-Finalists in the 1995 tournament. Angola has, in contrast to many other African countries, has never suffered a heavy defeat. They have seldom lost by more than two goals.

Angola finished in third place at the African Championship in 1995. Angola also qualified for the Championship in 2002, where they beat Zimbabwe and South Africa, but lost to Cameroon by one goal. Since then, Angola have not qualified for the championships.

During qualification for the 2008 Olympics, Angola did not get any further than the first round, where they lost to Ghana. However, they did reach the final of the COSAFA Cup, where they met South Africa, who beat them 3–1.

== History ==
=== Beginnings ===
Angola played their first game against South Africa on 7 January 1995, losing 3–1.

=== African Women's Championship/ Women's Africa Cup of Nations ===
Angola entered the 1995 African Women's Championship, against Cameroon, but it withdrew, thus Angola advanced by walkover and in the Second Round, they played their first official match on the first leg of the Second Round, against South Africa on 7 January 1995; in where they lost by 3–1. The second leg, was a 3–3 draw at home. These results provoked the elimination of Angola due to a 6–4 aggregate, but the Welwitschias ended as Semi-Finalists, along with Ghana.

Angola participated in the 2002 African Women's Championship qualifiers, against Equatorial Guinea. Both legs were won 3–0 and 3–1 respectively. Second Round matches where against Congo DR and First leg was won 1–0 and Second leg was lost also by 1–0, but won in penalties by 5–4 and qualified for the tournament who was held in Nigeria.

This time Angola was along with Zimbabwe, South Africa and Cameroon. The first match was against Zimbabwe and ended on a 1–1 draw with goal of the captain Irene Gonçalves at the 16 minutes. The same result occurred on the Second match against South Africa, but this time with goal of Jacinta Ramos at the 75 minutes. Last match was lost against Cameroon by 1–0 in a late Cameroonian goal at the 89 minutes, leaving Angola out of the tournament and the World Cup.

The Welwitschias played the 2006 African Women's Championship/2007 FIFA Women's World Cup qualifiers against Equatorial Guinea in First round, winning 3–2 in the first leg, but losing 3–1 in the second leg, and losing in aggregate by 5–4. Angola did not reach both the 2006 African Women's Championship or the 2007 FIFA Women's World Cup who was held in China PR.

Again, the team entered the 2010 African Women's Championship/2011 FIFA Women's World Cup qualifiers in the CAF first round against Namibia and lost the First leg 2–1, leading 1–0 in the half-time, with goal of Irene Gonçalves at the 37 minutes. The Second leg was a 1–1 draw, when it was winning 1–0, again with a goal of Irene Gonçalves at the 51 minutes. Angola did not qualify for either both tournaments.

Angola did not enter for the 2014 African Women's Championship/2015 FIFA Women's World Cup qualifiers, which was held in Namibia in Autumn 2014.

=== All-Africa Games ===
Angola entered for the first time to the All-Africa Games Football tournament, in the qualifiers for the 2007 edition in Algeria. Their rival was South Africa. They won the first leg by 3–2 and lost the second by 4–0, ending with an aggregate of 6–3, thus being eliminated from the tournament.

Angola failed to qualify to the 2011 All-Africa Games, celebrated in Mozambique, after losing in aggregate to Zimbabwe by 3–1, after drawing 1–1 and lose 2–0. Also these matches were the last matches that Angola played to the date.

=== Olympic Games qualifiers ===
The Welwitschias debuted on the Olympic Games football tournament qualifiers in the edition of 2008 edition, celebrated in China PR. Angola's first rival was Tanzania, but it withdrew; thus Angola advanced by walkover. In the Second Round, Angola played against Ghana, losing both matches by 2–1 and 2–0, ending with an aggregate of 4–1.

Despite being one year after the 2011 All-Africa Games, the 2012 Olympic Games Football Tournament qualification of Africa was held 4 months before the 2011 All-Africa Games qualifiers. Angola was paired with Namibia once again in a qualification round. They draw both matches by 2–2 and 0–0 respectively, but they lost due to the Away goals rule. Angola was eliminated of the tournament who took place in Great Britain

=== COSAFA Women's Championship ===
Angola made their debut in the 2006 edition before hosting the 2008 edition. They have not made it past the group stages in nine edition with their last outing in the 2025 edition.

== Team image ==
=== Home stadium ===
The Angola women's national football team is nicknamed Welwitschias. The name is derived from the Welwitschia mirabilis, a unique plant found in the Namib Desert in southern Angola, which is known for its incredible endurance and ability to survive in harsh conditions.

The team plays their home games at the Estádio Nacional de Ombaka and the Estádio 11 de Novembro.

== Results and fixtures ==
The following is a list of match results in the last 12 months, as well as any future matches that have been scheduled.

Legend

Win Draw Lose Void or Postponement Fixture

=== 2025 ===
23 October 2026 WAFCON qualifying	Angola	0–0	Malawi	Luanda
16:00 UTC+1		Report		Stadium: Estádio 11 de Novembro; Referee: Aline Umutoni (Rwanda)

28 October 2026 WAFCON qualifying	Malawi	2–0 (2–0 agg.)	Angola	Lilongwe, Malawi
15:00 UTC+2	Chinzimu 82', 84'	Report		Stadium: Bingu National Stadium; Referee: Rachel Zihindula (DR Congo)
Note: Malawi won 2–0 on aggregate.

=== 2026 ===
18 February 2025 COSAFA Championship	Lesotho	1–3	Angola	Polokwane, South Africa
12:00 UTC+2	Moalosi 49'	Report	Cristina 39'; Meury 42'; Ary Papel 54'	Stadium: Old Peter Mokaba Stadium; Referee: Grace Gimo (Zimbabwe)

21 February 2025 COSAFA Championship	South Africa	2–0	Angola	Polokwane, South Africa
12:30 UTC+2	Salgado 12'; Mthandi 78'	Report		Stadium: Seshego Stadium; Referee: Grace Gimo (Zimbabwe)

24 February 2025 COSAFA Championship	Angola	0–1	Malawi	Polokwane, South Africa
15:00 UTC+2		Report	Khumalo 77'	Stadium: Old Peter Mokaba Stadium

5 October for 13 October 2028 Olympic games qualifications	Angola	v	Namibia

== Head-to-head record ==
Statistics correct as of 24 February 2026

Opponent	Played	Won	Drawn	Lost	GF	GA	GD
Botswana	2	0	0	2	1	7	-7
Cameroon	1	0	0	1	0	1	−1
DR Congo	2	1	0	1	1	1	0
Comoros	3	1	1	1	7	4	+3
Equatorial Guinea	4	3	0	1	10	6	+4
Ghana	2	0	0	2	1	4	−3
Lesotho	1	1	0	0	3	1	+2
Mozambique	4	1	2	1	7	4	+3
Malawi	4	0	1	3	0	5	-5
Mauritius	1	1	0	0	3	0	+3
Namibia	5	1	3	1	7	5	+2
São Tomé and Príncipe	1	1	0	0	4	2	+2
South Africa	11	2	3	6	13	28	−15
South Africa U20	1	0	0	1	1	3	-2
Eswatini	2	2	0	0	6	3	+3
Zambia	4	0	0	4	1	12	-11
Zimbabwe	10	3	3	4	10	11	−1
Total	58	17	13	28	75	97	−22

== Coaching staff ==
=== Current coaching staff ===
As of January 2025

Position	Name	Ref.
Head coach	(Angola) Xavier Manuel Da Costa Chapanga	

=== Manager history ===
- Lurdes Lutonda (??–2021)
- Souza Garcia(2021–2024)
- Maniho Lóide Feliz(2024–2025)
- Xavier Manuel Da Costa Chapanga (2026–present

== Players ==
=== Current squad ===
- The following is the squad called up for the 2025 COSAFA .

No.	Pos.	Player	Date of birth (age)	Club
1	GK	Rita José "Rita"	20 March 1998 (aged 27)	(Angolan Football Federation) 4 de Julho
2	DF	Garça dos Santos "Naomi"	19 July 1997 (aged 28)	(Angolan Football Federation) 4 de Julho
3	DF	Manuela Simão "Nela"	4 April 2002 (aged 23)	(Angolan Football Federation) Petro de Luanda
4	DF	Emacleny Lando "Nelma"	27 December 2002 (aged 23)	(Angolan Football Federation) 4 de Julho
5	DF	Victória Fernando	14 September 2003 (aged 22)	(Angolan Football Federation) Petro de Luanda
6	MF	Sara Luvunga "Prado"	12 September 1999 (aged 26)	(Congolese Association Football Federation) TP Mazembe
7	FW	Cristina Makua "Cristina"	14 May 1995 (aged 30)	(Angolan Football Federation) 1° de Agosto
8	MF	Teresa Evaristo "Marizete"	24 April 1999 (aged 26)	(Angolan Football Federation) Petro de Luanda
9	FW	Domingas Luís "Mila"	5 May 2005 (aged 20)	(Angolan Football Federation) Petro de Luanda
10	DF	Paulina Sambo "Pauleta"	4 December 1996 (aged 29)	(Angolan Football Federation) Nacional de Benguela
11	FW	Joicelina Kituto "Joice"	2 April 2003 (aged 22)	(Angolan Football Federation) Petro de Luanda
12	GK	Maria Muecália "Valentina"	3 August 2006 (aged 19)	(Angolan Football Federation) Petro de Luanda
13	DF	Edvirgem de Jesus "Bibi"	4 August 2004 (aged 21)	(Angolan Football Federation) 1° de Agosto
14	MF	Nety Bah "Mamadou"	2 June 2000 (aged 25)	(Angolan Football Federation) 1° de Agosto
15	DF	Cátia Alves "Kecthia"	5 May 2005 (aged 20)	(Angolan Football Federation) Petro de Luanda
16	FW	Maria Viera "Meury"	17 August 2007 (aged 18)	(Angolan Football Federation) Wiliete
17	FW	Arminda Lopes "Ary Papel" (Captain)	10 February 1999 (aged 27)	(Angolan Football Federation) 4 de Julho
18	DF	Margarete Salvador "Margarete"	16 August 2002 (aged 23)	(Angolan Football Federation) 1° de Agosto
20	DF	Henriqueta Luanda "Luanda"	9 June 2002 (aged 23)	(Angolan Football Federation) 1° de Agosto
21	MF	Maria Ponda "Marlene"	3 April 2004 (aged 21)	(Angolan Football Federation) 1° de Agosto
22	GK	Sandrina António "Santa"	5 October 1997 (aged 28)	(Angolan Football Federation) 1° de Agosto
23	DF	Adelina Filipe "Pipi"	15 May 2007 (aged 18)	(Angolan Football Federation) Gloriosos

=== Recent call-ups ===
- The following players have been called up to an Angola squad in the past 12 months.

Pos.	Player	Date of birth (age)	Caps	Goals	Club	Latest call-up
DF	Matondo Matuvova	{{{age}}}	-	-	(Democratic Republic of the Congo) FC La Source	v. Malawi, 28 October 2025
DF	Vanuza Francisco	{{{age}}}	-	-	(Angola) C.D. Primeiro de Agosto	v. Malawi, 28 October 2025
DF	Graça Melinda	{{{age}}}	-	-	(Angola) 4 de Junho	v. Malawi, 28 October 2025
MF	Ana Costa	{{{age}}}	-	-	(Angola) C.D. Primeiro de Agosto	v. Malawi, 28 October 2025
MF	Lourdes Chitandula	{{{age}}}	-	-	(Angola) 4 de Junho	v. Malawi, 28 October 2025
FW	Alexandra Soares	{{{age}}}	-	-	(Greece) Asteras Tripolis	v. Malawi, 28 October 2025
FW	Flora Lacho	{{{age}}}	-	-	(Denmark) HB Køge	v. Malawi, 28 October 2025
FW	Patrícia Seteco	{{{age}}}	-	-	(Brazil) Ferroviária	v. Malawi, 28 October 2025

=== Previous squads ===
COSAFA Women's Championship

- 2020 COSAFA Women's Championship squad
- 2021 COSAFA Women's Championship squad
- 2022 COSAFA Women's Championship squad
- 2023 COSAFA Women's Championship squad

== Records ==
- Active players in **bold**, statistics correct **as of 24 February 2026**.

=== Most capped players ===
#	Player	Year(s)	Caps

=== Top goalscorers ===
#	Player	Goals	Caps	Year(s)
1	Irene Gonçalves	33		2002-2010
2	Jacinta Ramos "Guigui"	9		1995-2008
3	Cristina Makua	6	15	2020-present
4	Arminda Lopes " Ary Papel"	5	17	2019-present
5	Sara Luvunga "Prado"	4	10	2020-present
5				
6				
7				
8				
9				
10				

== Honours ==
African Women's Championship

- Semi-Finalist: (1) 1995

COSAFA Women's Championship

- Runners-up: (1) 2008

== Competitive record ==
=== FIFA Women's World Cup ===
FIFA Women's World Cup record
Year	Result	GP	W	D*	L	GF	GA	GD
(China) 1991	Did Not Enter							
(Sweden) 1995	Did not qualify							
(United States) 1999	Did Not Enter							
(United States) 2003	Did not qualify							
(China) 2007	Did not qualify							
(Germany) 2011	Did not qualify							
(Canada) 2015	Did Not Enter							
(France) 2019	Did Not Enter							
(Australia) (New Zealand) 2023	Did not qualify							
(Brazil) 2027	Did not qualify							
(Mexico) (United States) 2031	To be determined							
(United Kingdom) 2035	To be determined							
**Total**	**0/12**	-	-	-	-	-	-	-

*Draws include knockout matches decided on penalty kicks.

=== Olympic Games ===
Summer Olympics record
Year	Result	Matches	Wins	Draws	Losses	GF	GA
(United States) 1996	Did Not Enter						
(Australia) 2000	Did Not Enter						
(Greece) 2004	Did Not Enter						
(China) 2008	Did not qualify						
(United Kingdom) 2012	Did not qualify						
(Brazil) 2016	Did not qualify						
(Japan) 2021	Did not qualify						
(France) 2024	Did not enter						
(United States) 2028	To be continued						
Total	0/8	0	0	0	0	0	0

=== Africa Women Cup of Nations ===
Africa Women Cup of Nations record
Year	Result	Matches	Wins	Draws	Losses	GF	GA
1991	Did Not Enter						
1995	Semi-finals	2	0	1	1	4	6
(Nigeria) 1998	Did Not Enter						
(South Africa) 2000	Did Not Enter						
(Nigeria) 2002	Group Stage	3	0	2	1	2	3
(South Africa) 2004	Did Not Enter						
(Nigeria) 2006	Did not qualify						
(Equatorial Guinea) 2008	Did Not Enter						
(South Africa) 2010	Did not qualify						
(Equatorial Guinea) 2012	Did Not Enter						
(Namibia) 2014	Did Not Enter						
(Cameroon) 2016	Did Not Enter						
(Ghana) 2018	Did Not Enter						
2020	Cancelled						
(Morocco) 2022	Did not qualify						
(Morocco) 2024	Did not qualify						
(Morocco) 2026	Did not qualify						
Total	Semi Finalist	5	0	3	2	6	9

=== African Games ===
African Games record
Year	Result	Matches	Wins	Draws	Losses	GF	GA
(Nigeria) 2003	Did Not Enter						
(Algeria) 2007	Did not qualify						
(Mozambique) 2011	Did not qualify						
(Republic of the Congo) 2015	Did Not Enter						
(Morocco) 2019	See Angola women's national under-20 football team						
(Ghana) 2023	See Angola women's national under-20 football team						
Total	0/4	0	0	0	0	0	0

- 2019 and 2023 editions of the football tournament was played by the U-20 team.

==== COSAFA Women's Championship ====
COSAFA Women's Championship record
Year	Round	Pld	W	D*	L	GS	GA	GD
(Zimbabwe) 2002	did not enter							
(Zambia) 2006	**Group stage**	2	0	0	2	1	4	-3
(Angola) 2008	**Runners-Up**	5	4	0	1	13	1	+12
(Zimbabwe) 2011	did not enter							
(Zimbabwe) 2017	did not enter							
(South Africa) 2018	did not enter							
(South Africa) 2019	**Group stage**	3	1	0	2	4	9	-5
(South Africa) 2020	**Group stage**	3	1	1	1	5	6	−1
(South Africa) 2021	**Group stage**	3	0	2	1	2	4	−2
(South Africa) 2023	**Group stage**	3	1	0	2	6	4	+2
(South Africa) 2024	**Group stage**	2	0	0	2	1	6	-5
(South Africa) 2025	**Group stage**	3	1	0	2	3	4	-1
Total	8/12	24	8	3	13	35	38	-3

*Draws include knockout matches decided on penalty kicks.

== See also ==
- Sport in Angola
  - Football in Angola
    - Women's football in Angola
- Angola women's national under-20 football team
- Angola women's national under-17 football team
- Angola men's national football team
