= 2025 COSAFA Women's Championship =

Association football championship

Hollywoodbets COSAFA Women's Championship 2025

Tournament details
- Host country: South Africa
- City: Polokwane
- Dates: 18 February – 1 March 2026
- Teams: 11 (from 1 sub-confederation)
- Venues: 3 (in 1 host city)

Final positions
- Champions: Namibia (1st title)
- Runners-up: South Africa
- Third place: Zambia
- Fourth place: Zimbabwe

Tournament statistics
- Matches played: 19
- Goals scored: 46 (2.42 per match)
- Top scorer(s): (Lesotho) Makhotso Moalosi (Malawi) Deborah Henry (Malawi) Ireen Khumalo (Zimbabwe) Rutendo Makore (3 goals each)
- Best player: (Namibia) Zenatha Coleman
- Best goalkeeper: (Namibia) Melissa Matheus
- Fair play award: Zambia

The 2025 COSAFA Women's Championship, officially known as the 2025 Hollywoodbets COSAFA Women's Championship for sponsorship purposes, was the thirteenth edition of the COSAFA Women's Championship, the annual international women's association football championship was contested by the women's national teams of Southern Africa. Initially set to be held in the fall of 2025, the tournament was pushed to early 2026 due to the host's unavailability. South Africa hosted the tournament for the eighth straight edition from 18 February to 1 March 2026.

Zambia were the defending champions, having won their second title after beating South Africa 4–3 on penalties following a scoreless draw. However, they were unable to retain the trophy, as they were eliminated by eventual champions Namibia in the semi-finals. The Brave Gladiators went on to secure their maiden women's football title, defeating hosts South Africa 2–1 after extra time in the final. Zimbabwe's Rutendo Makore claimed the Golden Boot after scoring three goals throughout the tournament. Meanwhile, Namibia's forward Zenatha Coleman was awarded the Golden Ball after being voted the competition's best player. Her teammate Melissa Matheus secured the Golden Glove, presented to the tournament's top-performing goalkeeper.

== Postponement and host selection ==
By mid-October 2025, close to the initial scheduled period for the tournament to take place, it was announced that South Africa, which had hosted the previous seven editions, were not willing to host the tournament for an eighth time. With no other country willing to step in as host, COSAFA announced the postponement of the 2025 edition to the early quarter of 2026. With the tournament now pushed to early 2026, ahead of WAFCON taking place in March, the championship will serve as a preparation competition for the three regional body members that had qualified for the continental finals. On 23 January 2026, COSAFA confirmed that South Africa would host the tournament for an eighth time, providing fine-tuning ahead of the continent's finals.

== Location and venues ==
The 2025 edition was hosted in Polokwane, marking the city's first time hosting the tournament among South Africa's eight editions as host.

The following 3 venues were used for the tournament:

Polokwane			2025 COSAFA Women's Championship is located in South Africa
Seshego Stadium	Old Peter Mokaba Stadium	New Peter Mokaba Stadium	2025 COSAFA Women's Championship is located in South Africa
Capacity: 15,000	Capacity: 15,000	Capacity: 45,500	2025 COSAFA Women's Championship is located in South Africa

== Teams ==
=== Pariticpating teams ===
Eligibility for participation in the championship is open to all 14 COSAFA members; however, teams outside the regional body may also be eligible if they receive an invitation.

On 4 February 2026, COSAFA announced that 11 countries would participate in the 2025 edition. Comoros, Mauritius and Seychelles, all of which participated in 2024, decided not to participate in this edition.

Note: All appearance statistics exclude the 2008 edition.

Team	App	Last appearance	Previous best performance	FIFA ranking December 2025	Ref.
Angola	8th	2024	Runners-up (2008)	155	
Botswana	11th	2024	Runners-up (2020)	141	
Eswatini	11th	2024	Group stage (2002, 2006, 2017, 2018, 2019, 2020, 2021, 2022, 2023, 2024)	184	
Lesotho	10th	2024	Group stage (2002, 2006, 2008, 2011, 2017, 2018, 2020, 2022, 2023, 2024)	177	
Madagascar	6th	2024	Group stage (2017, 2018, 2019, 2023, 2024)	192	
Malawi	12th	2024	Champions (2023)	153	
Mozambique	11th	2024	Third place (2023)	172	
Namibia	9th	2024	Runners-up (2006)	124	
South Africa	12th	2024	Champions (2002, 2006, 2017, 2018, 2019, 2020)	55	
Zambia	12th	2024	Champions (2022, 2024)	64	
Zimbabwe	11th	2024	Champions (2011)	129	

=== Squads ===
Each national team had to submit a squad of 23 players, three of whom had to be goalkeepers.

== Draw ==
The final group stage draw took place in Polokwane on 4 February 2026 at 11:00 SAST (UTC+2).

The top three teams from the previous tournament were automatically seeded into the first positions of Groups A–C. Hosts South Africa were placed in A1, defending champions Zambia in B1, and Mozambique in C1. The remaining teams were allocated to two pots for the draw:

Pot 1	Pot 2
Malawi; Namibia; Botswana	Zimbabwe; Madagascar; Eswatini; Lesotho; Angola

== Match officials ==
COSAFA appointed 10 referees and 12 assistant referees for the tournament.

=== Referees ===
- (Angola) Laurinda Caluvi
- (Botswana) Kealeboga Koitsiwe
- (Lesotho) Mathapelo Morake
- (Madagascar) Élodie Livaharivony
- (Malawi) Rose Zimba
- (Mozambique) Cacilda Fernando
- (South Africa) Hloniphile Msezane
- (South Africa) Nonjabulo Ndlela
- (Zambia) Anna Banda
- (Zimbabwe) Grace Gimo

=== Assistant referees ===
- (Botswana) Kakale Mbiko
- (Eswatini) Patricia Mkhaliph
- (Madagascar) Elisane Rafanomezantsoa
- (Madagascar) Herilalaina Razafitsalama
- (Malawi) Happiness Mbandambanda
- (Mozambique) Margarete Gimo
- (Mozambique) Roda Mondlane
- (Namibia) Olivia Amukuu
- (Namibia) Eveline Augustinus
- (South Africa) Nandipha Menze
- (Zambia) Beauty Siatontola
- (Zimbabwe) Claris Simango

== Group stage ==
All times are local, SAST (UTC+2). The match schedule was announced by COSAFA on 5 February 2026.

Tie-breaking criteria for group play
The ranking of teams in the group stage was determined as follows:
1. Points obtained in the matches played between the teams in question (three points for a win, one for a draw, none for a defeat);
2. Goal difference in the matches played between the teams in question;
3. Number of goals scored in the matches played between the teams in question;
4. Goal difference in all group matches;
5. Fair play points in all group matches (only one deduction could be applied to a player in a single match):
  - Yellow card: −1 point;
  - Indirect red card (second yellow card): −3 points;
  - Direct red card: −4 points;
  - Yellow card and direct red card: −5 points;
6. Drawing of lots.

=== Group A ===
Pos	Team	Pld	W	D	L	GF	GA	GD	Pts	Qualification
1	South Africa (H)	3	2	1	0	5	1	+4	7	Advance to knockout stage
2	Malawi	3	2	0	1	9	3	+6	6	
3	Angola	3	1	0	2	3	4	−1	3	
4	Lesotho	3	0	1	2	3	12	−9	1	

Source: COSAFA
Rules for classification: Tiebreakers
(H) Hosts
18 February 2026
12:00

Lesotho	1–3	Angola
Moalosi 49'	Report	Cristina 39'; Meury 42'; Ary Papel 54'

Old Peter Mokaba Stadium, Polokwane
Referee: Grace Gimo (Zimbabwe)
18 February 2026
15:00

South Africa	2–0	Malawi
Holweni 63'; Mokoma 90+1'	Report

Old Peter Mokaba Stadium, Polokwane
Referee: Anna Banda (Zambia)

21 February 2026
12:30

South Africa	2–0	Angola
Salgado 12'; Mthandi 78'	Report

Seshego Stadium, Seshego
Referee: Grace Gimo (Zimbabwe)
21 February 2026
15:30

Malawi	8–1	Lesotho
Khumalo 4', 44'; Henry 10', 11', 45+2'; Chikupila 39'; V. Mkandawire 50'; Phikani 57'	Report	Moalosi 71'

Seshego Stadium, Seshego
Referee: Laurinda Caluvi (Angola)

24 February 2026
15:00

Angola	0–1	Malawi
	Report	Khumalo 77'

Old Peter Mokaba Stadium, Polokwane
Referee: Anna Banda (Zambia)
24 February 2026
15:00

South Africa	1–1	Lesotho
Mphelo 39'	Report	Moalosi 30'

Seshego Stadium, Seshego
Referee: Élodie Livaharivony (Madagascar)

=== Group B ===
Pos	Team	Pld	W	D	L	GF	GA	GD	Pts	Qualification
1	Zambia	3	2	1	0	5	1	+4	7	Advance to knockout stage
2	Zimbabwe	3	2	1	0	3	0	+3	7	Advance to knockout stage
3	Eswatini	3	0	1	2	2	5	−3	1	
4	Botswana	3	0	1	2	1	5	−4	1	

Source: COSAFA
Rules for classification: Tiebreakers
19 February 2026
12:00

Eswatini	0–2	Zimbabwe
	Report	Zvawanda 38'; Makore 53'

Old Peter Mokaba Stadium, Polokwane
Referee: Rose Zimba (Malawi)
19 February 2026
15:00

Zambia	3–0	Botswana
Chanda 16'; Banda 45+1'; Mupopo 72'	Report

Old Peter Mokaba Stadium, Polokwane
Referee: Nonjabulo Ndlela (South Africa)

22 February 2026
12:00

Botswana	1–1	Eswatini
Mamela 23'	Report	Mokgale 38'

Seshego Stadium, Seshego
Referee: Mathapelo Morake (Lesotho)
22 February 2026
15:00

Zambia	0–0	Zimbabwe
	Report

Seshego Stadium, Seshego
Referee: Rose Zimba (Malawi)

24 February 2026
12:00

Zimbabwe	1–0	Botswana
Makore 70'	Report

Seshego Stadium, Seshego
Referee: Nonjabulo Ndlela (South Africa)
24 February 2026
12:00

Zambia	2–1	Eswatini
Musesa 23'; Chitundu 51'	Report	Mokgale 15'

Old Peter Mokaba Stadium, Polokwane
Referee: Cacilda Fernando (Mozambique)

=== Group C ===
Pos	Team	Pld	W	D	L	GF	GA	GD	Pts	Qualification
1	Namibia	2	1	0	1	2	1	+1	3	Advance to knockout stage
2	Mozambique	2	1	0	1	2	2	0	3	
3	Madagascar	2	1	0	1	1	2	−1	3	

Source: COSAFA
Rules for classification: Tiebreakers
20 February 2026
15:00

Mozambique	0–2	Namibia
	Report	Alweendo 2'; Hikuam 78'

Old Peter Mokaba Stadium, Polokwane
Referee: Élodie Livaharivony (Madagascar)

23 February 2026
15:00

Namibia	0–1	Madagascar
	Report	Razanampiavy 24'

Seshego Stadium, Seshego
Referee: Hloniphile Msezane (South Africa)

25 February 2026
15:00

Mozambique	2–0	Madagascar
Banze 31'; Manuel 68'	Report

Old Peter Mokaba Stadium, Polokwane
Referee: Mathapelo Morake (Lesotho)

=== Ranking of second-place teams ===
Due to groups having a different number of teams, the results against the fourth-placed teams in four-team groups were not considered for this ranking.

Pos	Grp	Team	Pld	W	D	L	GF	GA	GD	Pts	Qualification
1	B	Zimbabwe	2	1	1	0	2	0	+2	4	Advance to knockout stage
2	C	Mozambique	2	1	0	1	2	2	0	3	
3	A	Malawi	2	1	0	1	1	2	−1	3	

Source: COSAFA

== Knockout stage ==
In the semi-finals, matches level after 90 minutes were decided by a penalty shoot-out, while extra time (followed by penalties if required) would be used only in the final.

=== Bracket ===
Semi-finals
27 February – Polokwane
Zambia	0
Namibia	1
27 February – Polokwane
South Africa (p)	1 (4)
Zimbabwe	1 (2)

Final
1 March – Polokwane
Namibia (a.e.t.)	2
South Africa	1
Third place play-off
1 March – Polokwane
Zambia	3
Zimbabwe	1

=== Semi-finals ===
27 February 2026
12:00

Zambia	0–1	Namibia
	Report	Blou 90'

New Peter Mokaba Stadium, Polokwane
Referee: Nonjabulo Ndlela (South Africa)

27 February 2026
15:00

South Africa	1–1	Zimbabwe
Majiya 39'	Report	Chinyerere 11'
Penalties
Majiya (penalty scored); Mokoma (penalty scored); Pila (penalty scored); October (penalty scored)	4–2	(penalty scored) Chinyerere; (penalty scored) Kondo; (penalty missed) Sipini; (penalty missed) Ndlovu

New Peter Mokaba Stadium, Polokwane
Referee: Mathapelo Morake (Lesotho)

=== Third place play-off ===
1 March 2026
12:00

Zambia	3–1	Zimbabwe
A. Phiri 4', 28'; Chipasula 45'	Report	Makore 45+2'

New Peter Mokaba Stadium, Polokwane
Referee: Élodie Livaharivony (Madagascar)

=== Final ===
1 March 2026
15:00

Namibia	2–1 (a.e.t.)	South Africa
Hanavi 54'; Ngonda 92'	Report	Majiya 37'

New Peter Mokaba Stadium, Polokwane
Referee: Rose Zimba (Malawi)

== Goalscorers ==
There were 46 goals scored in 19 matches, for an average of 2.42 goals per match.

3 goals

- (Lesotho) Makhotso Moalosi
- (Malawi) Deborah Henry
- (Malawi) Ireen Khumalo
- (Zimbabwe) Rutendo Makore

2 goals

- (Eswatini) Nonjabuliso Mokgale
- (South Africa) Nthabiseng Majiya
- (Zambia) Agness Phiri

1 goal

- (Angola) Arminda Lopes
- (Angola) Cristina Makua
- (Angola) Maria Viera
- (Botswana) Nolofatso Mamela
- (Madagascar) Aimée Razanampiavy
- (Malawi) Vanessa Chikupila
- (Malawi) Vitumbiko Mkandawire
- (Malawi) Olivia Phikani
- (Mozambique) Amélia Banze
- (Mozambique) Cina Manuel
- (Namibia) Leena Alweendo
- (Namibia) Juliana Blou
- (Namibia) Muhinatjo Hanavi
- (Namibia) Millicent Hikuam
- (Namibia) Memory Ngonda
- (South Africa) Sibulele Holweni
- (South Africa) Bonolo Mokoma
- (South Africa) Thoriso Mphelo
- (South Africa) Nonhlanhla Mthandi
- (South Africa) Gabriela Salgado
- (Zambia) Susan Banda
- (Zambia) Regina Chanda
- (Zambia) Mercy Chipasula
- (Zambia) Avell Chitundu
- (Zambia) Kabange Mupopo
- (Zambia) Agness Musesa
- (Zimbabwe) Ethel Chinyerere
- (Zimbabwe) Praynence Zvawanda

Source: COSAFA

== Awards ==
The following awards were given at the conclusion of the tournament: the Golden Boot (top scorer), Golden Ball (best overall player) and Golden Glove (best goalkeeper).

Golden Boot
(Zimbabwe) Rutendo Makore
Golden Ball
(Namibia) Zenatha Coleman
Golden Glove
(Namibia) Melissa Matheus
COSAFA Fair Play Trophy
Zambia

COSAFA Team of the Tournament

Group Stage Best XI and Coach

Goalkeeper	Defenders	Midfielders	Forwards
(Zimbabwe) Cynthia Shonga	(Malawi) Ireen Khumalo (Zimbabwe) Agnes Tumbare (Eswatini) Simangele Sikhondze (Zimbabwe) Nobukhosi Ncube	(Zambia) Eneless Phiri (Namibia) Zenatha Coleman (South Africa) Sbongakonke Mzobe (Angola) Ary Papel	(Malawi) Deborah Henry (Lesotho) Makhotso Moalosi
Coach: Sithethelewe Sibanda (Zimbabwe)

Final Best XI and Coach

Goalkeeper	Defenders	Midfielders	Forwards
(Namibia) Melissa Matheus	(Malawi) Ireen Khumalo (Zimbabwe) Agnes Tumbare (Namibia) Lovisa Mulunga (Zambia) Margaret Belemu	(Zambia) Eneless Phiri (Namibia) Zenatha Coleman (South Africa) Nthabiseng Majiya	(Lesotho) Makhotso Moalosi (Zimbabwe) Rutendo Makore (Malawi) Deborah Henry
Coach: Lesley Kakuva (Namibia)

== Broadcasting rights ==
Country	Broadcaster	Ref.
World	FIFA+	
World	COSAFA on YouTube	
