= Zenatha Coleman =

Namibian footballer (born 1993)

Personal information
- Full name: Zenatha Goeieman Coleman
- Date of birth: 25 September 1993 (age 33)
- Place of birth: Keetmanshoop, Namibia
- Height: 1.60 m (5 ft 3 in)
- Positions: Midfielder; forward

Team information
- Current team: Dogan Türk Birlıgı

Senior career*
Years	Team	Apps	(Gls)
2011–2015	JS Academy		(22+)
2016–2017	Gintra Universitetas	31	(110)
2018	Zaragoza CFF	14	(7)
2018–2020	Valencia	47	(11)
2020–2022	Sevilla	44	(8)
2022–2024	Fenerbahçe	65	(38)
2024-2026	Beylerbeyı	18	(4)
2026	Dogan Türk Birlıgı		

International career
2010–	Namibia	48	(30)
- * Club domestic league appearances and goals

Zenatha Goeieman Coleman (born 25 September 1993) is a Namibian professional footballer who plays as a winger for Dogan Türk Birlıgı and captains the Namibia women's national team.

Coleman was the 2025 COSAFA Women's Championship player of the tournament.

== Club career ==
In October 2022, Coleman moved to Turkey, and signed with the Istanbul-based club Fenerbahçe S.K. to play in the Women's Super League.

== International career ==
Coleman was part of the Namibian team at the 2014 African Women's Championship.

She was named the 2025 COSAFA Women's Championship player of the tournament after picking up two player of the match awards including one in the final when Namibia won their maiden championship.

== International goals ==
No.	Date	Venue	Opponent	Score	Result	Competition
1.	14 October 2014	Sam Nujoma Stadium, Windhoek, Namibia	Ivory Coast	1–1	1–3	2014 African Women's Championship
2.	18 March 2016	Sam Nujoma Stadium, Windhoek, Namibia	Zambia	1–2	2–2	2016 Women's Africa Cup of Nations qualification
3.	18 March 2016	Sam Nujoma Stadium, Windhoek, Namibia	Zambia	2–2	2–2	2016 Women's Africa Cup of Nations qualification
4.	13 September 2017	Barbourfields Stadium, Bulawayo, Zimbabwe	Botswana	2–0	4–0	2017 COSAFA Women's Championship
5.	3 August 2019	Wolfson Stadium, KwaZakele, South Africa	Zambia	1–1	2–3	2019 COSAFA Women's Championship
6.	6 August 2019	Gelvandale Stadium, Port Elizabeth, South Africa	Mauritius	1–0	8–0	2019 COSAFA Women's Championship
7.	6 August 2019	Gelvandale Stadium, Port Elizabeth, South Africa	Mauritius	5–0	8–0	2019 COSAFA Women's Championship
8.	6 August 2019	Gelvandale Stadium, Port Elizabeth, South Africa	Mauritius	6–0	8–0	2019 COSAFA Women's Championship
9.	6 August 2019	Gelvandale Stadium, Port Elizabeth, South Africa	Mauritius	7–0	8–0	2019 COSAFA Women's Championship
10.	20 October 2021	National Stadium, Dar Es Salaam, Tanzania	Tanzania	1–0	2–1	2022 Women's Africa Cup of Nations qualification
11.	20 October 2021	National Stadium, Dar Es Salaam, Tanzania	Tanzania	2–1	2–1	2022 Women's Africa Cup of Nations qualification
12.	23 October 2021	Dobsonville Stadium, Johannesburg, South Africa	Tanzania	1–1	3–2	2022 Women's Africa Cup of Nations qualification
13.	23 October 2021	Dobsonville Stadium, Johannesburg, South Africa	Tanzania	2–1	3–2	2022 Women's Africa Cup of Nations qualification
14.	23 October 2021	Dobsonville Stadium, Johannesburg, South Africa	Tanzania	3–1	3–2	2022 Women's Africa Cup of Nations qualification
15.	4 September 2022	NMU Stadium, Port Elizabeth, South Africa	Eswatini	5–1	5–1	2022 COSAFA Women's Championship
16.	6 September 2022	NMU Stadium, Port Elizabeth, South Africa	Lesotho	2–0	2–0	2022 COSAFA Women's Championship
17.	13 July 2023	FNB Stadium, Johannesburg, South Africa	Equatorial Guinea	1–0	2–0	2024 CAF Women's Olympic Qualifying Tournament
18.	25 October 2024	Isaac Wolfson Stadium, Ibhayi, South Africa	Seychelles	6–0	7–0	2024 COSAFA Women's Championship
19.	28 October 2024	Isaac Wolfson Stadium, Ibhayi, South Africa	Eswatini	1–0	2–0	2024 COSAFA Women's Championship
20.	28 October 2024	Isaac Wolfson Stadium, Ibhayi, South Africa	Eswatini	2–0	2–0	2024 COSAFA Women's Championship
21.	22 October 2025	Dobsonville Stadium, Johannesburg, South Africa	Zambia	2–2	2–4	2026 Women's Africa Cup of Nations qualification

== Honours ==
Namibia

- COSAFA Women's Championship: 2025

Individual

- 2025 COSAFA Women's Championship: Player of the Tournament
