= Gabriela Salgado =

South African soccer player (born 1998)

Personal information
- Full name: Gabriela de Jesus Thomas Salgado
- Date of birth: 20 February 1998 (age 28)
- Place of birth: Johannesburg, South Africa
- Height: 1.58 m (5 ft 2 in)
- Positions: Midfielder; defender

Senior career*
Years	Team	Apps	(Gls)
2015–	JvW		

International career^{‡}
2020–	South Africa	17	(6)
- * Club domestic league appearances and goals ‡ National team caps and goals as of 00:45, 17 July 2022 (UTC)

Gabriela de Jesus Thomas Salgado (European Portuguese: [ɡɐβɾiˈɛlɐ ðɨ ʒɨˈzuʃ tuˈmaʃ salˈɣaðu, -lɐ d ʒɨˈ-]; born 20 February 1998) is a South African soccer player who plays as a midfielder or defender for JvW and the South Africa women's national team.

== Early life ==
Salgado was born in Johannesburg, Gauteng to a Portuguese father and a Lebanese mother.

== Club career ==
Salgado made her club debut with JvW in 2015. With this club, she won the 2019 Sasol League National Championship, scoring one of the goals against Ma-Indies Ladies from Limpopo 2-0 in the final.

== International career ==
Salgado was first called up to the South Africa national team on 22 January 2017, albeit as an unused substitute against France.

Salgado was named to senior women's team at the 2020 COSAFA Women's Championship. She scored the team's winning goal in the 66th minute in the final en route to their seventh COSAFA title.

On 23 June 2023, Salgado was added to the final squad at the 2023 World Cup.

Salgado was named in the South African squad for the 2024 Women's Africa Cup of Nations. On 22 July 2025, she a fractured her mid-shaft in her left leg during the semi-final match against Nigeria, ruling her out for the remainder of the year.

== International goals ==
No.	Date	Venue	Opponent	Score	Result	Competition
1.	6 November 2020	Wolfson Stadium, Ibhayi, South Africa	Eswatini	3–0	5–0	2020 COSAFA Women's Championship
2.	6 November 2020	Wolfson Stadium, Ibhayi, South Africa	Eswatini	5–0	5–0	2020 COSAFA Women's Championship
3.	14 November 2020	Wolfson Stadium, Ibhayi, South Africa	Botswana	2–1	2–1	2020 COSAFA Women's Championship
4.	20 October 2021	Estádio do Zimpeto, Maputo, Mozambique	Mozambique	3–0	7–0	2022 Women's Africa Cup of Nations qualification
5.	20 October 2021	Estádio do Zimpeto, Maputo, Mozambique	Mozambique	5–0	7–0	2022 Women's Africa Cup of Nations qualification
6.	21 February 2026	Seshego Stadium, Seshego, South Africa	Angola	1–0	2–0	2025 COSAFA Women's Championship
7.	13 October 2026	Free State Stadium, Bloemfontein, South Africa	Madagascar	1–0	3–0	2028 CAF Women's Olympic qualifying tournament

== Personal life ==
Salgado is in a relationship with South African soccer player Robyn Moodaly. Having been engaged in December 2024, they married in November 2025.

== Honours ==
South Africa

- COSAFA Women's Championship: 2020: runners-up: 2025

JVW

- SAFA Women's League runners-up: 2025
- Sasol League National Championship: 2019
