= Nothando Vilakazi =

South African soccer player (born 1988)

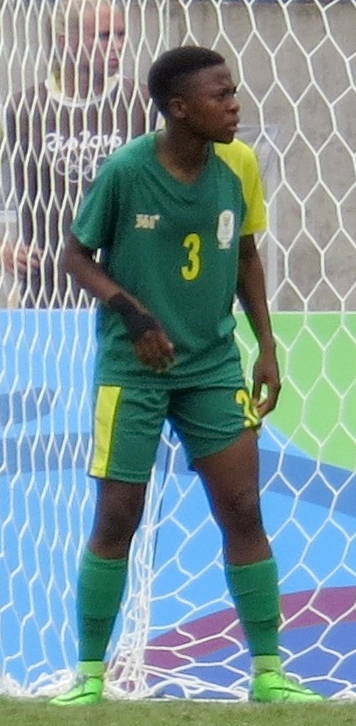
- Vilakazi at the 2016 Olympics

Personal information
- Date of birth: 28 October 1988 (age 38)
- Place of birth: Middelburg, South Africa
- Height: 1.60 m (5 ft 3 in)
- Position: Defender

Team information
- Current team: TS Galaxy Queens
- Number: 11

Senior career*
Years	Team	Apps	(Gls)
- Moroka Swallows
- Palace Super Falcons
2019	Gintra Universitetas	3	(3)
2020–2021	Logroño	6	(0)
2021–2023	TUT Matsatsantsa Ladies		
2023–	TS Galaxy Queens	1	(0)

International career
2007–	South Africa	133	(7)
- * Club domestic league appearances and goals as of 27 June 2021

Nothando "Vivo" Vilakazi (born 28 October 1988) is a South African soccer player who plays as a defender for TS Galaxy Queens and the South Africa women's national team.

== Early life ==
Nothando Vilakazi was born in Middelburg, South Africa, on 28 October 1988. She played for a boys team between the ages of 9 and 14, when she started playing with girls. At the age of 17, she started playing in the Sasol League for the Highlanders team. She completed her schooling at TuksSport High School, associated with the University of Pretoria's High Performance Centre, for which she was selected while representing Mpumalanga at a tournament.

== Career ==
Vilakazi played for Palace Super Falcons, having previously played for Moroka Swallows. In footballing circles, she is nicknamed "Vivo".

=== International career ===
Vilakazi was called up for the first time by the South Africa women's national football team against Ghana in 2007 but did not play. She made her international debut on August 10, 2008 against Netherlands. Vilakazi has been a regular feature of the team as they were managed by Vera Pauw. Vilakazi was part of the team which were runners up in the 2012 African Women's Championship.

As part of the South African team, she has played at both the 2012 Summer Olympics in London, United Kingdom, and the 2016 Summer Olympics in Rio de Janeiro, Brazil. She played in all six of South Africa's games at the 2016 tournament. Vilakazi has continued to feature in the squads for the nation following the transition to the management of Desiree Ellis after the Olympics.

No.	Date	Venue	Opponent	Score	Result	Competition
1.	6 July 2011	Gwanzura, Harare, Zimbabwe	Malawi	1–1	5–1	2011 COSAFA Women's Championship
