= Uerikondjera Kasaona =

Namibian footballer

Personal information
- Date of birth: 13 May 1987 (age 39)
- Place of birth: Sesfontein, Namibia
- Position: Defender

Senior career*
Years	Team	Apps	(Gls)
- 21 Brigade United
2007	Okahandja Beauties.		
- Germania Hauenhorst FC
- Welhelmsfeld
2014-	Khomas Nampol FC		

International career^{‡}
- Namibia

Managerial career
- 2019–: Namibia (women)
- 2025 -2026: Blue Waters FC
- * Club domestic league appearances and goals ‡ National team caps and goals as of 11 october 2014 (before the 2014 African Women's Championship)

Uerikondjera Kasaona (born 13 May 1987) is a Namibian former footballer who played as a defender and the current manager of the Namibia women's national team. She is nicknamed Mamie and also known as the Himba Gladiator. She was second vice president of the Namibian Football Players' Union until November 2016 when she resigned alongside Ronald Ketjijere. She owns the Kasaona Football Academy which she opened in 2017 which produced 3 players at Blue Waters FC. She retired from playing in January 2025.

== Club career ==
Kasanoa has played for the Okahandja Beauties and 21 Brigade United. She has also played for the German teams Germania Hauenhorst FC and Welhelmsfeld. She played for Khomas Nampol FC from 2014, winning the Women Super League Cup in 2017.

== International career ==
Kasaona captained Namibia at the 2014 African Women's Championship.

== Managerial Career ==
Kasaona was appointed interim head coach of the Brave Gladiators and the Young Gladiators in July 2019 ahead of the Cosafa Women's Championship later that year. She took over from Brian Isaacs. Her assistant was Robert Nauseb.

She was invited to participate in the CAF B Diploma Course in Tanzania in 2024.

She was appointed head coach for the Blue Waters FC in 2025. She led the team to victory in the Nedbank Namibian Newspaper Cup, becoming the first female head coach to do so. She was replaced alongside her assistant coach Steven Damaseb with Armando Pedro and Thomas Mvula.
