= Lydia Eixas =

Namibian footballer (born 1986)

Personal information
- Date of birth: 7 November 1986 (age 39)
- Height: 1.70 m (5 ft 7 in)
- Position: Goalkeeper

Team information
- Current team: Girls & Goals

Senior career*
Years	Team	Apps	(Gls)
- Girls & Goals

International career^{‡}
- Namibia
- * Club domestic league appearances and goals ‡ National team caps and goals as of 11 October 2014 (before the 2014 African Women's Championship)

Lydia Eixas (born 7 November 1986) is a Namibian footballer who plays as a goalkeeper for Namibia Women's Super League club Girls & Goals and the Namibia women's national team. Nicknamed Keeparo, she was part of the team at the 2014 African Women's Championship.
