= Deborah Henry (footballer) =

Malawian footballer (born 2004)

- in 2026

Personal information
- Date of birth: 28 September 2004 (age 22)
- Position: Forward

Team information
- Current team: Silver Strikers Ladies
- Number: 14

Senior career*
Years	Team	Apps	(Gls)
2021	Gafu Sisters		
2022–2023	DD Sunshine		
2023–	Silver Strikers Ladies	20	(23)

International career^{‡}
2026–	Malawi	2	(3)
Medal record
Women's Africa Cup of Nations
Silver medal – second place	2026 Morocco
- * Club domestic league appearances and goals ‡ National team caps and goals as of 21 February 2026

Deborah Henry (born 28 September 2004) is an ambidextrous Malawian footballer who plays as a forward for NBM Women's Premiership club Silver Strikers Ladies and the Malawi national team. She was named top goal scorer and player of the year in the 2025/26 history.

== Club career ==
In late 2021, Henry was first identified through the TC11 Investment Women Football Bonanza, a grassroots initiative aimed at discovering and developing emerging female talent in Malawi. Her performances at the tournament highlighted her goalscoring ability and earned her wider recognition, setting her on a path that took her to Gafu Sisters, DD Sunshine which subsequently became Silver Strikers Ladies.

Henry helped Silver Strikers Ladies secure the inaugural NBM Women's Premiership title, scoring 23 goals in 20 appearances and finishing as the league's Golden Boot winner.

Silver Strikers against Gaborone United in 2026

Henry was a prolific goal scorer. In 18 games for the Silver Strikers she scored 24 goals during the 2025/2026 season. She was named top goal scorer and the FAM player of the year.

== International career ==
After being included in Fazili's 32-player provisional squad for the Women's Africa Cup of Nations (WAfCON) qualifying matches against Angola in October 2025, Henry earned her first senior call-up in February 2026 for the 2025 COSAFA Women's Championship. On 18 February 2026, she made her senior debut, coming on as an 85th-minute substitute against South Africa. On 21 February, she scored her first international goals, netting a hat-trick against Lesotho in her first start for the national team. The final score was 8:1 and Henry had scored three of them and assisted in two others. She was made the player of the match.

Henry was one of the 23-member squad representing Malawi in their debut appearance at the 2026 Women's Africa Cup of Nations (WAFCON) in Rabat, Morocco. They were ranked 153rd and they were the rank outsiders, they continued to win taking down Nigeria who were a favourite. In the semi-final against Algeria they won 3:1. The team's performance at WAFCON was described as the most "remarkable by an international team in a major tournament ever". The team made the final where they were defeated 3:0 by Cameroon who became the champions at their fourth time in the WAFCON final.

== Career statistics ==
=== International ===
As of match played 21 February 2026

Appearances and goals by national team and year
National team	Year	Apps	Goals
Malawi	2026	2	3
Total		2	3

Scores and results list Malawi's goal tally first, score column indicates score after each Henry goal.

List of international goals scored by Deborah Henry
No.	Date	Venue	Opponent	Score	Result	Competition
1.	21 February 2026	Seshego Stadium, Seshego, South Africa	Lesotho	2–0	8–1	2025 COSAFA Women's Championship
2.	21 February 2026	Seshego Stadium, Seshego, South Africa	Lesotho	3–0	8–1	2025 COSAFA Women's Championship
3.	21 February 2026	Seshego Stadium, Seshego, South Africa	Lesotho	6–0	8–1	2025 COSAFA Women's Championship
4.	15 April 2026	Nyayo National Stadium, Nairobi, Kenya	India	2–2	2–3	2026 FIFA Series
