= Lesotho women's national football team =

Women's national association football team representing Lesotho

Lesotho
- Nickname: "Mehalalitoe"
- Association: Lesotho Football Association (LeFA)
- Confederation: CAF (Africa)
- Sub-confederation: COSAFA (Southern Africa)
- Head coach: Shalane Lehohla
- Captain: Boitumelo Rabale
- FIFA code: LES
First colours	Second colours

FIFA ranking
- Current: 178 ▼1 (16 June 2026)
- Highest: 111 (December 2017 – March 2018)
- Lowest: 177 (December 2025)

First international
- Mozambique 3–0 Lesotho (Mozambique; 28 March 1998)

Biggest win
- Botswana 0–3 Lesotho (Harare, Zimbabwe;21 April 2002); Botswana 0–3 Lesotho (Gaborone, Botswana; 14 August 2016); Lesotho 3–0 Eswatini (Gqeberha, South Africa; 1 September 2022)

Biggest defeat
- Lesotho 0–15 Zimbabwe (Harare, Zimbabwe; 19 April 2002)

The Lesotho women's national football team, also known affectionately as Mehalalitoe ("The Beautiful Flowers"), represents Lesotho in international women's football. Governed by the Lesotho Football Association (LFA), the team has demonstrated steady progress in recent years, particularly within the regional Council of Southern Africa Football Associations (COSAFA) competitions.

== History ==
The senior team is nicknamed the Beautiful Flowers.

On 28 March 1998, Lesotho played Mozambique in Mozambique. The game was tied 0–0 at the half before Mozambique scored three goals to win the game 3–0. In Maseru on 19 April 1998, Lesotho again played Mozambique. Lesotho was up 2–1 at the half and went on to win the game 4–2. In 2002, the team played 4 games. The country participated in the 2002 COSAFA Women's Championship in Harare, Zimbabwe. They were in Group A. They lost on 19 April to Zimbabwe 0–15, lost to Malawi 0–3 on 21 April, and lost to Zambia 1–3 on 23 April. In 2003, the team played 1 game. In 2004, the team played 1 game. In 2005, the team played 2 games. In 2005, Zambia was supposed to host a regional COSAFA women's football tournament, with ten teams agreeing to send teams including South Africa, Zimbabwe, Mozambique, Malawi, Seychelles, Mauritius, Madagascar, Lesotho, Botswana, Namibia, Lesotho and Swaziland.

In 2006, the team had 3 training sessions a week and played 2 games. The country participated in the 2006 Council of Southern Africa Football Associations women's tournament in Lusaka. They were in Group B. On 22 August, they lost to South Africa 0–9. On 23 August, the team lost to Malawi 0–3. The national team's poor performance was contributed to by the fact that they only held a training camp for the competition a week before it started. In 2006, the national team coach was Lethola Masimong. Masimong wanted a national league created in the country in order to help develop the game and improve the national team's performance. His comments came after the team was eliminated from the 2006 Confederation of Southern African Football Associations tournament.

In 2010, the country did not have a team competing in the African Women's Championships. The country did not have a team competing at the 2011 All Africa Games. In July 2011, the team played several games in Harare. On 2 July 2011, the Lesotho played Zimbabwe, losing 0–4. On 2 July, they played Mozambique. At half time, they were tied 2–2 but went on to win the game 3–2. On 5 July, they lost to Malawi 2–5. The games were part of the 2011 COSAFA Women's Championship. On 17 August 2011, in a game in Maseru, they lost 0–4 to Mozambique.

In 2006, Lesotho women's national football team was ranked 125. In 2007, they were ranked 144. In 2008, they were ranked 117. In 2009, they were ranked 92. In 2010, they were ranked 128. In 2011, they were ranked 136. In March 2012, they were ranked 135th best in the world. In June 2012, the team was ranked the 135th best in the world.

The following years saw a surge in Mehalalitoe's activity. The team consistently competed in the COSAFA Women's Championship, a tournament featuring national teams from Southern Africa.

In the 2023 COSAFA Women's Championship, Mehalalitoe faced strong competition in the group stages. They fell short against Zimbabwe, Namibia, and Botswana, but their performance showcased promising developments.

Looking beyond COSAFA tournaments, Mehalalitoe participated in a friendly match against Botswana on April 6, 2024. Though they faced a narrow defeat, the game served as valuable preparation for upcoming qualifiers.

== Background and development ==
Early development of the women's game at the time colonial powers brought football to the continent was limited as colonial powers in the region tended to take make concepts of patriarchy and women's participation in sport with them to local cultures that had similar concepts already embedded in them. The lack of later development of the national team on a wider international level symptomatic of all African teams is a result of several factors, including limited access to education, poverty amongst women in the wider society, and fundamental inequality present in the society that occasionally allows for female specific human rights abuses. When quality female football players are developed, they tend to leave for greater opportunities abroad. Continent wide, funding is also an issue, with most development money coming from FIFA, not the national football association. Future, success for women's football in Africa is dependent on improved facilities and access by women to these facilities. Attempting to commercialize the game and make it commercially viable is not the solution, as demonstrated by the current existence of many youth and women's football camps held throughout the continent. Nada Grkinic was FIFA's international development manager. In 2007, one of her goals was to work on improving women's football in Africa and included work specifically pertaining to Lesotho.

The national federation was created in 1932. They joined FIFA in 1964. Their kit includes blue, white and green shirts, white shorts, and blue and white socks.

Football is the third most popular sport in the country, behind netball and athletics. Inside Lesotho, football is used to develop women's self-esteem. In 2006, there were 5,200 registered female football players, of which 5,000 were junior players and 200 were senior players. The number of female players has been increasing. In 2000, there were 210 registered players. In 2001, there were 350 registered players. In 2002, there were 480 registered players. In 2003, there were 750 registered players. In 2004, there were 2,180 registered players. In 2005, there were 4,600 registered players. In 2006, there were 5,200 registered players. In 2006, there were 61 total football clubs in the country, with 54 being mixed gendered teams and 7 being all women teams. Rights to broadcast the 2011 Women's World Cup in the country were bought by the African Union of Broadcasting.

== Results and fixtures ==
The following is a list of match results in the last 12 months, as well as any future matches that have been scheduled.

Win Draw Lose Fixture

=== 2025 ===
22 November Friendly	Eswatini	1–1	Lesotho	Lobamba, Eswatini
09:00	Mokgale 58'		Ts'oinyane 45+7' (pen.)	Stadium: Somhlolo National Stadium

22 November Friendly	Lesotho	0–1	Mozambique	Lobamba, Eswatini
14:00			Moçambique 66'	Stadium: Somhlolo National Stadium

=== 2026 ===
18 February 2025 COSAFA Championship	Lesotho	1–3	Angola	Polokwane, South Africa
14:00	Moalosi 49'	Report	Makua 39'; Viera 42'; Lopes 54'	Stadium: Old Peter Mokaba Stadium; Referee: Grace Gimo (Zimbabwe)

21 February 2025 COSAFA Championship	Malawi	8–1	Lesotho	Polokwane, South Africa
15:30	Khumalo 4', 44'; Henry 10', 11', 45+2'; Chikupila 39'; V. Mkandawire 50'; Phikani 57'	Report	Moalosi 71'	Stadium: Seshego Stadium; Referee: Laurinda Caluvi (Angola)

24 February 2025 COSAFA Championship	South Africa	1–1	Lesotho	Polokwane, South Africa
15:00		Report		Stadium: Seshego Stadium

== Coaching staff ==
=== Managerial history ===
- Lehloenya Nkhasi(20xx–2022)
- (Lesotho) Pule Khojane (2022-202?)
- (Lesotho) Shalane Lehohla(202?-)

== Players ==
=== Current squad ===
- The following players were named for the 2025 COSAFA Women's Championship on February 2026.

No.	Pos.	Player	Date of birth (age)	Club
1	GK	Nthabiseng Hlao	6 March 2002 (aged 23)	(Lesotho Football Association) Lijabatho Ladies
2	DF	Mats'eliso Mosala	1 April 1997 (aged 28)	(Lesotho Football Association) Kick4Life
3	DF	Mpho Molefe	18 November 2005 (aged 20)	(Lesotho Football Association) Kick4Life
4	DF	Mats'eliso Makeke	10 October 2003 (aged 22)	(Lesotho Football Association) Lijabatho Ladies
5	DF	Limpho Nthako	25 November 2006 (aged 19)	(Lesotho Football Association) Berea Ladies
6	MF	Rapelang Makhetha	13 March 2005 (aged 20)	(Lesotho Football Association) Lijabatho Ladies
7	MF	Molemo Mokhothu	8 October 1998 (aged 27)	(Lesotho Football Association) Kick4Life
8	MF	Mamasoabi Monese	5 March 1999 (aged 26)	(Lesotho Football Association) LDF Ladies
9	MF	Mampona Lekenyane	22 August 2008 (aged 17)	(Lesotho Football Association) Berea Ladies
10	FW	Reitumetse Namane	22 August 2002 (aged 23)	(Lesotho Football Association) Kick4Life
11	FW	Lits'eoane Maloro (Captain)	13 May 1996 (aged 29)	(South African Football Association) UWC Ladies
12	FW	Makhotso Moalosi	4 July 2003 (aged 22)	(Lesotho Football Association) LDF Ladies
13	MF	Ntsoaki Nthethe	2 April 2003 (aged 22)	(Lesotho Football Association) Villa Ladies
14	DF	Nteboheleng Ramatsoku	22 May 2001 (aged 24)	(Lesotho Football Association) Lijabatho Ladies
15	FW	Phuzile Molefe	18 January 1997 (aged 29)	(Lesotho Football Association) Berea Ladies
16	GK	Boelo Lepheana	6 May 1997 (aged 28)	(Lesotho Football Association) Kick4Life
17	FW	Nthabeleng Potsane	29 October 1998 (aged 27)	(Lesotho Football Association) LDF Ladies
18	MF	Maseriti Mohlolo	22 April 1997 (aged 28)	(Lesotho Football Association) LDF Ladies
19	DF	Bokang Ntsane	20 July 2002 (aged 23)	(Lesotho Football Association) LDF Ladies
20	MF	Mpolokeng Liphamamo	31 July 2001 (aged 24)	(Lesotho Football Association) Kick4Life
21	MF	Lerato Tsoinyane	10 February 2004 (aged 22)	(Lesotho Football Association) Kick4Life
22	GK	Lineo Fanyane	23 January 1999 (aged 27)	(Lesotho Football Association) Setoko
23	DF	Liteboho Tjobe	13 October 2003 (aged 22)	(Lesotho Football Association) Berea Ladies

=== Recent call-ups ===
The following players have been called up to the Lesotho squad in the past 12 months.

Pos.	Player	Date of birth (age)	Caps	Goals	Club	Latest call-up
GK	Nketsetseng Chaole				(Lesotho) Bokamoso Ladies	v. Mozambique, 30 November 2025
GK	Itumeleng Mokherane				(Lesotho) LMPS Ladies	v. Mozambique, 30 November 2025
DF	Khopotso Morapeli				(Lesotho) LCS Ladies	v. Mozambique, 30 November 2025
DF	Mahali Sepiriti				(Lesotho) Kick4Life Women	v. Mozambique, 30 November 2025
DF	Nthabeleng Mathosi				(Lesotho) Lijabatho Ladies	v. Mozambique, 30 November 2025
MF	Moseme Khasane				(Lesotho) Lijabatho Ladies	v. Mozambique, 30 November 2025
MF	Lineo Sekhonyana				(Lesotho) Berea Ladies	v. Mozambique, 30 November 2025
MF	'Makose Sehloho				(Lesotho) Lijabatho Ladies	v. Mozambique, 30 November 2025
MF	'Maphutheho Motati				(Lesotho) Berea Ladies	v. Mozambique, 30 November 2025
FW	Limpho Ralejoe				(Lesotho) Villa Ladies	v. Mozambique, 30 November 2025
FW	Katleho Mafereka	{{{age}}}	-		(Lesotho) Berea Ladies	v. Mozambique, 30 November 2025

=== Previous squads ===
COSAFA Women's Championship

- 2022 COSAFA Women's Championship squad
- 2023 COSAFA Women's Championship squad

== Competitive record ==
=== FIFA Women's World Cup ===
FIFA Women's World Cup record
Year	Result	GP	W	D*	L	GF	GA	GD
(China) 1991	Did not exist							
(Sweden) 1995	Did not exist							
(United States) 1999	Did not exist							
(United States) 2003	Did not exist							
(China) 2007	Did not enter							
(Germany) 2011	Did not enter							
(Canada) 2015	Did not qualify							
(France) 2019	Did not enter							
(Australia) (New Zealand) 2023	Did not enter							
(Brazil) 2027	To be determined							
Total	0/10	-	-	-	-	-	-	-

=== Olympic Games ===
Summer Olympics record
Year	Result	Pld	W	D*	L	GS	GA	GD
(United States) 1996	Did not exist							
(Australia) 2000	Did not exist							
(Greece) 2004	Did not exist							
(China) 2008	Did not Qualify							
(United Kingdom) 2012	Did not enter							
(Brazil) 2016	Did not enter							
(Japan) 2020	Did not enter							
(France) 2024	Did not enter							
Total	0/8	0	0	0	0	0	0	0

*Draws include knockout matches decided on penalty kicks.

=== Africa Women Cup of Nations ===
Africa Women Cup of Nations record
Year	Result	Matches	Wins	Draws	Losses	GF	GA
1991 to (South Africa) 2004	Did not exist						
(Nigeria) 2006 to (Equatorial Guinea) 2012	Did not enter						
(Namibia) 2014	Did not Qualify						
(Cameroon) 2016	Did not enter						
(Ghana) 2018	Did not enter						
(Republic of the Congo) 2020	Cancelled due to COVID-19 pandemic in Africa						
(Morocco) 2022	Did not enter						
(Morocco) 2024	Did not enter						
Total	0/12	-	-	-	-	-	-

=== African Games ===
African Games record
Year	Result	Matches	Wins	Draws	Losses	GF	GA	GD
(Nigeria) 2003	Did Not exist							
(Algeria) 2007	Did Not enter							
(Mozambique) 2011	Did Not enter							
(Republic of the Congo) 2015	Did Not enter							
(Morocco) 2019	Did Not enter							
(Ghana) 2023	Did Not enter							
Total	0/5	0	0	0	0	0	0	

=== Regional ===
==== COSAFA Women's Championship ====
COSAFA Women's Championship record
Year	Round	Pld	W	D*	L	GS	GA	GD
(Zimbabwe) 2002	Group stage							
(Zambia) 2006	Group stage							
(Angola) 2008	Did not enter							
(Zimbabwe) 2011	Group stage	3	1	0	2	5	11	−6
(Zimbabwe) 2017	Group stage	3	1	0	2	2	7	−5
(South Africa) 2018	Group stage	3	0	0	3	1	10	−9
(South Africa) 2019	Did not enter							
(South Africa) 2020	Group stage	2	0	0	2	0	17	−17
(South Africa) 2021	Did not enter							
(South Africa) 2023	Group stage	3	0	0	3	0	6	-6
(South Africa) 2025	Group stage	3	0	1	3	3	12	-9
Total	Group stage	17	2	1	13	11	63	−52

*Draws include knockout matches decided on penalty kicks.

== See also ==
- Sport in Lesotho
  - Football in Lesotho
    - Women's football in Lesotho
- Lesotho women's national under-17 team
- Lesotho women's national under-20 team
- Lesotho men's national football team
