= Melissa Matheus =

Namibian footballer (born 1998)

Melisa Matheus
Personal information
- Date of birth: 14 June 1998 (age 28)
- Position: Goalkeeper

Team information
- Current team: Beauties

Senior career*
Years	Team	Apps	(Gls)
- Tura Magic
- Beauties

International career
- Namibia
- * Club domestic league appearances and goals

Melisa Matheus (born 14 June 1998) is a Namibian footballer who plays as a goalkeeper for Namibia Women's Super League club Beauties and the Namibia women's national team.

Matheus was the 2025 COSAFA Women's Championship goalkeeper of the tournament.

== International career ==
Matheus capped for Namibia at senior level during the 2018 Africa Women Cup of Nations qualification. She was named the 2025 COSAFA Women's Championship goalkeeper of the tournament after assisting Namibia to their maiden championship.
