= Nthabiseng Majiya =

South African soccer player

Personal information
- Full name: Nthabiseng Ronisha Majiya
- Date of birth: 10 June 2004 (age 22)
- Place of birth: Philippolis, Free State, South Africa
- Position: Striker

Team information
- Current team: Mamelodi Sundowns
- Number: 31

Senior career*
Years	Team	Apps	(Gls)
2021–2023	Richmond United		(48)
2024–	Mamelodi Sundowns	17	(10)

International career^{‡}
2020–2022	South Africa U20		
2022–	South Africa	15	(6)
Medal record
Representing South Africa
Women's Africa Cup of Nations
First place	2022 Morocco
- * Club domestic league appearances and goals ‡ National team caps and goals as of 18 April 2026

Nthabiseng Ronisha Majiya (born 10 June 2004) is a South African professional soccer player who plays as a forward for SAFA Women's League club Mamelodi Sundowns and the South African women's national team.

== Personal life ==
She attended Philippolis Secondary School in the Free State.

== Club career ==
=== Richmond United ===
Majiya finished as the second best goal scorer in the 2021 Hollywoodbets Super League, with 20 goals in her maiden season for Richmond United. She was very instrumental in her side's campaign, scoring nearly half of the 44 goals scored by the club in league matches in 2021. She was named the Hollywoodbets Super League Young Player of the Season for the 2021 and 2022 seasons. She also scored 17 goals from 23 appearances in the 2022 Hollywoodbets Super League and was ranked the 3rd highest goal scorer in the league. She scored 11 goals from 24 appearances in the 2023 Hollywoodbets Super League.

=== Mamelodi Sundowns ===
On 15 February 2024, Majiya joined SAFA Women's League side Mamelodi Sundowns Ladies. She scored her first goal on debut against Royal AM on 3 March 2024.

== International career ==
She was part of the South African women's national team at the 2022 Women's Africa Cup of Nations where they won their first continental title in Morocco. She scored the winning goal in a 1–0 victory against Botswana in the final group stage match.She scored winning goal in a friendly against Algeria on 14 April 2026.

=== International goals ===
No.	Date	Venue	Opponent	Score	Result	Competition
1.	10 July 2022	Prince Moulay Abdellah Stadium, Rabat, Morocco	Botswana	1–0	1–0	2022 Women's Africa Cup of Nations
2.	1 June 2024	Stade Lat-Dior, Thiès, Senegal	Senegal	1–1	1–1	Friendly
3.	27 February 2026	New Peter Mokaba Stadium, Polokwane, South Africa	Zimbabwe	1–0	1–1 (4–2 p)	2025 COSAFA Women's Championship
4.	1 March 2026	New Peter Mokaba Stadium, Polokwane, South Africa	Namibia	1–0	1–2 (a.e.t.)	2025 COSAFA Women's Championship
5.	14 April 2026	Princess Magogo Stadium, KwaMashu, South Africa	Algeria	1–0	1–0	Friendly
6.	17 April 2026	King Zwelithini Stadium, Umlazi, South Africa	Algeria	1–0	2–0	Friendly

== Honours ==
South Africa

- Women's Africa Cup of Nations: 2022

Mamelodi Sundowns

- SAFA Women's League: 2024, 2025

Individual

- 2021 SAFA Women's League: Young Player of the Season
- 2021 SAFA Women's League: 2nd best Goal Scorer (20 goals)
- 2022 SAFA Women's League: Young Player of the Season
- 2022 SAFA Women's League: 3rd best Goal Scorer (17 goals)
