= Victor Matine =

Mozambican teacher and football manager

Personal information
- Date of birth: 24 June 1966 (age 60)

Managerial career
- Years: Team
- CD UP Manica
- Mozambique U20
- Mozambique U23
- 2019: Mozambique

Victor Matine (born 24 June 1966) is a Mozambican teacher and football coach who became manager of the Mozambique national football team in July 2019, before being replaced in August 2019. He had previously coached the under-20 and under-23 national teams, as well as club side CD UP Manica.
