= Felizarda Lemos =

Mozambican football manager

Personal information
- Place of birth: Mozambique

Managerial career
- Years: Team
- Mozambique

Felizarda Lemos is a Mozambican football manager who managed the Mozambique women's national football team.

== Early life ==
Lemos has been nicknamed "Tia Fifi" and "Mana Fifi".

== Education ==
Lemos attended Maputo University in Mozambique.

== Career ==
Lemos started her managerial career in 2007. She became the first Mozambican female manager to manage a senior men's club.

== Personal life ==
Lemos has been married. She holds a CAF C Coaching License.
