= CD UP Manica =

- Full name: Clube Desportivo Universidade Pedagógica de Manica
- Ground: Complexo Ferroviário de Gondola, Gondola, Mozambique
- League: Moçambola

Clube Desportivo Universidade Pedagógica de Manica is a football club based in Gondola (near Chimoio), Manica Province, Mozambique, which currently competes in the Moçambola. UP Manica was promoted after winning the 2017 Moçambola 2 (Center Zone) championship, and the club's first season in the top level of Mozambican football will begin in 2018.
