= Lithuanian Women's Supercup =

LFF Supertaurę
- Sport: Football
- Founded: 2005
- No. of teams: 2
- Country: Lithuania
- Most titles: Gintra Universitetas; TexTilite Ukmerge (1 title)

The Lithuanian Women's Supercup (Lietuvos moterų supertaurė) was a one-off fixture in Lithuanian football played between the A Lyga champions and the winners of the Lithuanian Women's Cup. In 2005 and 2006 Gintra Universitetas won the league and the cup thus the supercup was played against cup runners-up.

== Previous winners ==
Previous winners are:

| Season | Winner | Result | Runner-up | Ref. |
|---|---|---|---|---|
| 2005 | TexTilitė Ukmergė | 3–2 | Gintra Universitetas | |
| 2006 | Gintra Universitetas | 4–0 | FK Akmenė | |
