= Ongos SC (women) =

Namibian women's football team

- Full name: Ongos Sports club
- Founded: 2012; 13 years ago, as Tura Magic Sports Club
- League: Namibia Women's Super League

Ongos Sports club is a Namibian professional women's football club in Windhoek who plays in the Namibia Women's Super League, the top tier of Namibian women's football.

== History ==
Ongos SC was founded as Tura Magic Sports Club. In summer 2023 the club was purchased and renamed Ongos FC after the Ongos Valley. At that time, former Brave Warriors coach Ricardo Mannetti was named Sporting Director.

Tura Magic FC is a professional soccer team based in Windhoek, Namibia. The team was founded in 2012 and quickly established itself as one of the top clubs in the country. Known for their fast-paced and attacking style of play, Tura Magic FC has a strong fan base and a reputation for producing talented young players.

The team's colors are blue and white, and they play their home matches at the Sam Nujoma Stadium. Tura Magic FC competes in the Namibia Premier League, the top tier of Namibian football, and has consistently been a contender for the league title. Tura Magic FC is known for their commitment to developing local talent and providing opportunities for young players to showcase their skills. Overall, Tura Magic FC is a respected and competitive team in Namibian football.

In the 2023–2024 season, Ongos secured their fifth Namibia Women's Super League title. With this victory, Ongos earned a spot in the 2024 CAF Women's Champions League COSAFA Qualifiers, where they will represent Namibia in the competition.

== Honours ==
Type	Competition	Titles	Winning Seasons	Runners-up
Domestic	Namibia Women's Super League	5	2016, 2019, 2021, 2023, 2024	
Domestic	Namibia Women's Cup	1	2024	

== See also ==
- Namibia Women's Super League
- CAF Women's Champions League
