= Eswatini women's national football team =

Women's national association football team representing Eswatini

Eswatini
- Nickname: Sitsebe Samhlekazi
- Association: Eswatini Football Association
- Confederation: CAF (Africa)
- Sub-confederation: COSAFA (Southern Africa)
- Head coach: Christian Thwala
- Home stadium: Somhlolo National Stadium
- FIFA code: SWZ
First colours	Second colours	Third colours

FIFA ranking
- Current: 184 (16 June 2026)
- Highest: 97 (June 2009)
- Lowest: 184 (December 2025)

First international
- South Africa 14–0 Swaziland (Johannesburg, South Africa; 30 May 1993)

Biggest win
- Eswatini 6–0 Seychelles (Gqeberha, South Africa; 22 October 2024)

Biggest defeat
- South Africa 14–0 Swaziland (Johannesburg, South Africa; 30 May 1993)

The Eswatini women's national football team, nicknamed Sitsebe Samhlekazi, represents Eswatini, formerly known as Swaziland, in international football and is controlled by the Eswatini Football Association.

== History ==
Eswatini made their competitive debut in the qualification for the 1998 African Championships, where they lost to their neighbours, South Africa. The team has yet to advance out of the group stages of the COSAFA Women's Championship.

== Team image ==
=== Nicknames ===
The Eswatini women's national football team has been known or nicknamed as "Sitsebe Samhlekazi".

== Results and fixtures ==
The following is a list of match results in the last 12 months, as well as any future matches that have been scheduled.

Legend

Win Draw Lose Fixture

=== 2025 ===
23 November 2025 Friendly	Eswatini	1–1	Lesotho	Lobamba, Eswatini
11:00				Stadium: Somhlolo Stadium

24 November 2025 Friendly	Eswatini	0–1	Mozambique	Lobamba, Eswatini
10:00				Stadium: Somhlolo Stadium

=== 2026 ===
19 February 2025 COSAFA Women's Championship	Eswatini	0–2	Zimbabwe	Polokwane
12:00		Report	Zvawanda 38'; Makore 53'	Stadium: Old Peter Mokaba Stadium; Referee: Rose Zimba (Malawi)

22 February 2025 COSAFA Championship	Botswana	1–1	Eswatini	Seshego, South Africa
12:00 UTC+2	Mamela 23'	Report	Mokgale 38'	Stadium: Seshego Stadium; Referee: Mathapelo Morake (Lesotho)

24 February 2025 COSAFA Women's Championship	Zambia	2–1	Eswatini	Polokwane, South Africa
12:00	Musesa 23'; Chitundu 51'	Report	Mokgale 15'	Stadium: Old Peter Mokaba Stadium; Referee: Cacilda Fernando (Mozambique)

== Coaching staff ==
=== Current coaching staff ===
As of October 2024

Position	Name	Ref.
Head coach	Bongani Makhukhula	

=== Manager history ===
- Christian Thwala (????–2022)
- Simephi Mamba(2022–2024)
- Bongani Makhukhula(2024–)

== Players ==
=== Current squad ===
The following is the squad called up for the 2025 COSAFA Women's Championship 22-player squad on 17 February 2026.

No.	Pos.	Player	Date of birth (age)	Club
1	GK	Nonduduzo Mhlanga (Note: A player named on the official final squad list submitted by their national association did not travel to the tournament. Although registered within the maximum permitted squad, the player remained a non-travelling reserve due to logistical, financial, strategic, or club commitment reasons.)	1 February 2002 (aged 24)	(Eswatini Football Association) Nsingizini Hotspurs
2	MF	Siphelele Mpandza	14 May 2008 (aged 17)	(Eswatini Football Association) Nsingizini Hotspurs
3	MF	Samkelisiwe Fakudze	6 August 2004 (aged 21)	(Eswatini Football Association) Nsingizini Hotspurs
4	DF	Khulekile Mamba	14 May 1999 (aged 26)	(Eswatini Football Association) Green Mamba
5	DF	Siphiwe Mndzebele	24 July 2000 (aged 25)	(Eswatini Football Association) Royal Leopards
6	DF	Ncedo Gamedze	22 March 2000 (aged 25)	(Eswatini Football Association) Nsingizini Hotspurs
7	MF	Bethusile Mathonsi	26 January 2006 (aged 20)	(Eswatini Football Association) Manzini Wanderers
8	MF	Simile Marks	7 May 2002 (aged 23)	(Eswatini Football Association) Young Buffaloes
9	DF	Philisiwe Dlamini	6 November 2004 (aged 21)	(Eswatini Football Association) Nsingizini Hotspurs
10	FW	Nonjabuliso Mokgale	7 July 2003 (aged 22)	(Eswatini Football Association) Young Buffaloes
11	MF	Temasime Sukati	11 June 2006 (aged 19)	(Eswatini Football Association) Nsingizini Hotspurs
12	MF	Samkelisiwe Malinga	20 August 2003 (aged 22)	(Eswatini Football Association) Young Buffaloes
13	DF	Simangele Sikhondze (Captain)	5 February 2002 (aged 24)	(Eswatini Football Association) Young Buffaloes
14	FW	Neliswa Ngcamphalala	25 September 2005 (aged 20)	(Eswatini Football Association) Nsingizini Hotspurs
15	MF	Anele Ngwenya	31 May 2004 (aged 21)	(Eswatini Football Association) Nsingizini Hotspurs
16	GK	Nompilo Dlamini	6 November 2004 (aged 21)	(Eswatini Football Association) Nsingizini Hotspurs
17	MF	Neliswa Msibi	18 April 2004 (aged 21)	(Eswatini Football Association) Manzini Wanderers
18	DF	Badelise Ngozo	27 June 1997 (aged 28)	(Eswatini Football Association) Young Buffaloes
19	MF	Temalangeni Dlamini	18 August 2002 (aged 23)	(Eswatini Football Association) Young Buffaloes
20	MF	Siphilele Masuku	22 February 2005 (aged 20)	(Eswatini Football Association) Green Mamba
21	MF	Nozwelo Shongwe	28 August 2003 (aged 22)	(Eswatini Football Association) AS Interladies
22	FW	Thandolwethu Simelane	23 January 2000 (aged 26)	(Eswatini Football Association) Green Mamba
23	GK	Lindelwa Gwebu	15 May 2006 (aged 19)	(Eswatini Football Association) AS Interladies

=== Recent call-ups ===
The following players have been called up to an Eswatini squad in the past 12 months.

Pos.	Player	Date of birth (age)	Caps	Goals	Club	Latest call-up

=== Previous squads ===
COSAFA Women's Championship

- 2020 COSAFA Women's Championship squad
- 2022 COSAFA Women's Championship squad
- 2023 COSAFA Women's Championship squad

== Competitive record ==
=== FIFA Women's World Cup ===
FIFA Women's World Cup record
Year	Result	GP	W	D*	L	GF	GA	GD
(China) 1991	Did Not Enter	-	-	-	-	-	-	-
(Sweden) 1995	Did Not Enter	-	-	-	-	-	-	-
(United States) 1999	Did not qualify	-	-	-	-	-	-	-
(United States) 2003	Did Not Enter	-	-	-	-	-	-	-
(China) 2007	Did Not Enter	-	-	-	-	-	-	-
(Germany) 2011	Did Not Enter	-	-	-	-	-	-	-
(Canada) 2015	Did Not Enter	-	-	-	-	-	-	-
(France) 2019	Did not qualify	-	-	-	-	-	-	-
(Australia) (New Zealand) 2023	Did not qualify	-	-	-	-	-	-	-
Total	0/9	-	-	-	-	-	-	-

*Draws include knockout matches decided on penalty kicks.

=== Olympic Games ===
Summer Olympics record
Year	Result	Matches	Wins	Draws	Losses	GF	GA
(United States) 1996	Did Not Enter						
(Australia) 2000	Did Not Enter						
(Greece) 2004	Did Not Enter						
(China) 2008	Did not qualify						
(United Kingdom) 2012	Did not qualify						
(Brazil) 2016	Did not qualify						
(Japan) 2021	Did not qualify						
Total	0/7	0	0	0	0	0	0

=== Africa Women Cup of Nations ===
Africa Women Cup of Nations record
Year	Round	GP	W	D*	L	GS	GA	GD
1991	Did not enter							
1995	Did not enter							
(Nigeria) 1998	Did not qualify							
(South Africa) 2000	Did not enter							
(Nigeria) 2002	Did not enter							
(South Africa) 2004	Did not enter							
(Nigeria) 2006	Did not enter							
(Equatorial Guinea) 2008	Did not enter							
(South Africa) 2010	Did not enter							
(Equatorial Guinea) 2012	Did not enter							
(Namibia) 2014	Did not enter							
(Cameroon) 2016	Did not enter							
(Ghana) 2018	Did not qualify							
2020	Cancelled							
(Morocco) 2022	Did not qualify							
(Morocco) 2024	Did not qualify							
Total	0/12	-	-	-	-	-	-	-

*Draws include knockout matches decided on penalty kicks.

=== African Games ===
African Games record
Year	Result	Matches	Wins	Draws	Losses	GF	GA
(Nigeria) 2003	Did Not Enter						
(Algeria) 2007	Did not qualify						
(Mozambique) 2011	Did not qualify						
(Republic of the Congo) 2015	Did Not Enter						
(Morocco) 2019	Did not qualify						
(Ghana) 2023	To Be Determined						
Total	0/6	0	0	0	0	0	0

==== COSAFA Women's Championship ====
COSAFA Women's Championship record
Year	Round	Pld	W	D*	L	GS	GA	GD
(Zimbabwe) 2002	Group stage							
(Zambia) 2006	Group stage							
(Angola) 2008	-							
(Zimbabwe) 2011	did not enter							
(Zimbabwe) 2017	Group stage	1	1	1	1	5	3	+2
(South Africa) 2018	Group stage	3	0	0	3	4	11	−7
(South Africa) 2019	Group stage	3	2	0	1	7	8	−1
(South Africa) 2020	Group stage	3	1	0	2	7	11	−4
(South Africa) 2021	Group stage	3	0	0	3	1	11	−10
(South Africa) 2023	Group stage	3	1	0	2	2	12	-10
Total	Group stage	16	5	1	12	26	56	−30

*Draws include knockout matches decided on penalty kicks.

== See also ==
- Sport in Eswatini
  - Football in Eswatini
    - Women's football in Eswatini
- Eswatini men's national football team
