= Gwanzura =

Football stadium in Highfield, Harare

Coordinates: 17.8916°S 30.9931°E

Gwanzura is a football stadium in Highfield, Harare it was built in the 1960s. It is bordered by Mushandirapamwe Hotel, Machipisa council bar, bus station, Jerusalem suburb and by a Zuva station owned by the Emmerson Mnangagwa.It was built by the brothers Eric and Phanuel Gwanzura to defy colonial restrictions on access to sporting infrastructure for black Africans.

Historically, it has been the home ground of CAPS United, Blue line aces and Lions. It hosts Castle Lager premier soccer matches.

There media reports in February 2008 that indicated that the stadium was in a poor state, with one reporter going as far as to compare it to a harvested wheat field. The Harare City Council is charged with the upkeep of the stadium.
