= Namibia Women's Super League =

- Founded: 2005; 21 years ago
- Country: Namibia
- Confederation: CAF
- Number of clubs: 14
- International cup(s): CAF W-Champions League; COSAFA Women's Champions League
- Current champions: Beauties F.C. (13th title) (2024–25)
- Most championships: Beauties F.C. (13th title)
- Website: Facebook
- Current: 2025-26 W-Super League

The Namibia Women's Super League, also called the FNB Women's Super League for sponsorship reasons, is a semi-professional level women's association football league in Namibia. It is organized by the Namibia Football Association.

== History ==
In 2005 women's football was only played informally with very few teams. In November 2006 FIFA granted Namibia the right to host the Football Seminar for South & East Africa Countries to discuss, elaborate and share best practices and establish a plan of action to develop the women's game. A national championship was then contested, consisting of regional leagues and playoffs for the championship. From 2009 to 2011 there was no competition.

In 2011 the Women's Super League was created with six teams. FIFA help starting the league by sponsoring 100,000 Namibian dollars and football attires and training equipment for the teams. The first season was won by Jacqueline Shipanga (JS) Academy.

In 2014 a U20 Super League was created.

In 2023, the league secured N$7.5 million over three years in sponsorship from FNB Namibia.

== Champions ==
The list of champions and runners-up. Okahandja Beauties won at least four championships before creation of the super league. The 2014 season was suspended because funds needed were used for hosting the 2014 African Women's Championship. The second season then was 2015/16.

Year	Champions	Runners-up
2005	Okahandja Beauties	Rehoboth Queens FC
2006–07	Okahandja Beauties	Rehoboth Queens FC
2007–08	Okahandja Beauties	Rehoboth Queens FC
2009	Okahandja Beauties	Rehoboth Queens FC
2010	not played due to financial and organisational problems	
2011–12	Jacqueline Shipanga Academy FC	Okahandja Beauties FC
2013	postponed due to financial and organisational problems	
2014	not played	
2015–16	Tura Magic Ladies	Khomas Nampol Ladies
2016–17	not played	
2017–18	not played	
2018–19	Tura Magic Ladies	Khomas Nampol Ladies
2019–20	cancelled because of the COVID-19 pandemic in Namibia	
2020–21	Tura Magic Ladies	
2021–22	not played	
2022–23	Tura Magic Ladies	Girls & Goals
2023–24	Ongos SC	Okahandja Beauties
2024–25	Okahandja Beauties	Ongos SC

== Most successful clubs ==
Rank	Club	Champions	Runners-up	Championship seasons	Runners-up seasons
1	Okahandja Beauties	5	2	2005, 2007, 2008, 2009, 2024/25	2012, 2023/24
2	Tura Magic Ladies	4	1	2016, 2019, 2021, 2023	2024/25
3	Jacqueline Shipanga Academy FC	1	0	2012	
4	Rehoboth Queens FC	0	4		2005, 2007, 2008, 2009
5	Khomas Nampol Ladies FC	0	2		2016, 2019
6	Girls & Goals FC	0	1		2023
