= Beauties F.C. =

Women's football team in Namibia

- Full name: Okahandja Beauties Football Club
- Stadium: NFA Technical Stadium
- Owner: Salome Iyambo
- Head Coach: (Namibia) Salome Iyambo
- League: Namibia Women's Super League
- 1st

Beauties F.C., also known as Okahandja Beauties, is a women's professional soccer club based in Okahandja, Namibia. The team competes in the Namibia Women's Super League, the top tier women's football league in Namibia.

They are the most successful women's team in Namibia with 13 titles.

== History ==
=== Namibia Women's Super League ===
They won their maiden championship in the 2005 season.

They won their thirteenth title in the 2024/25 season.

=== COSAFA Women's Champions League ===
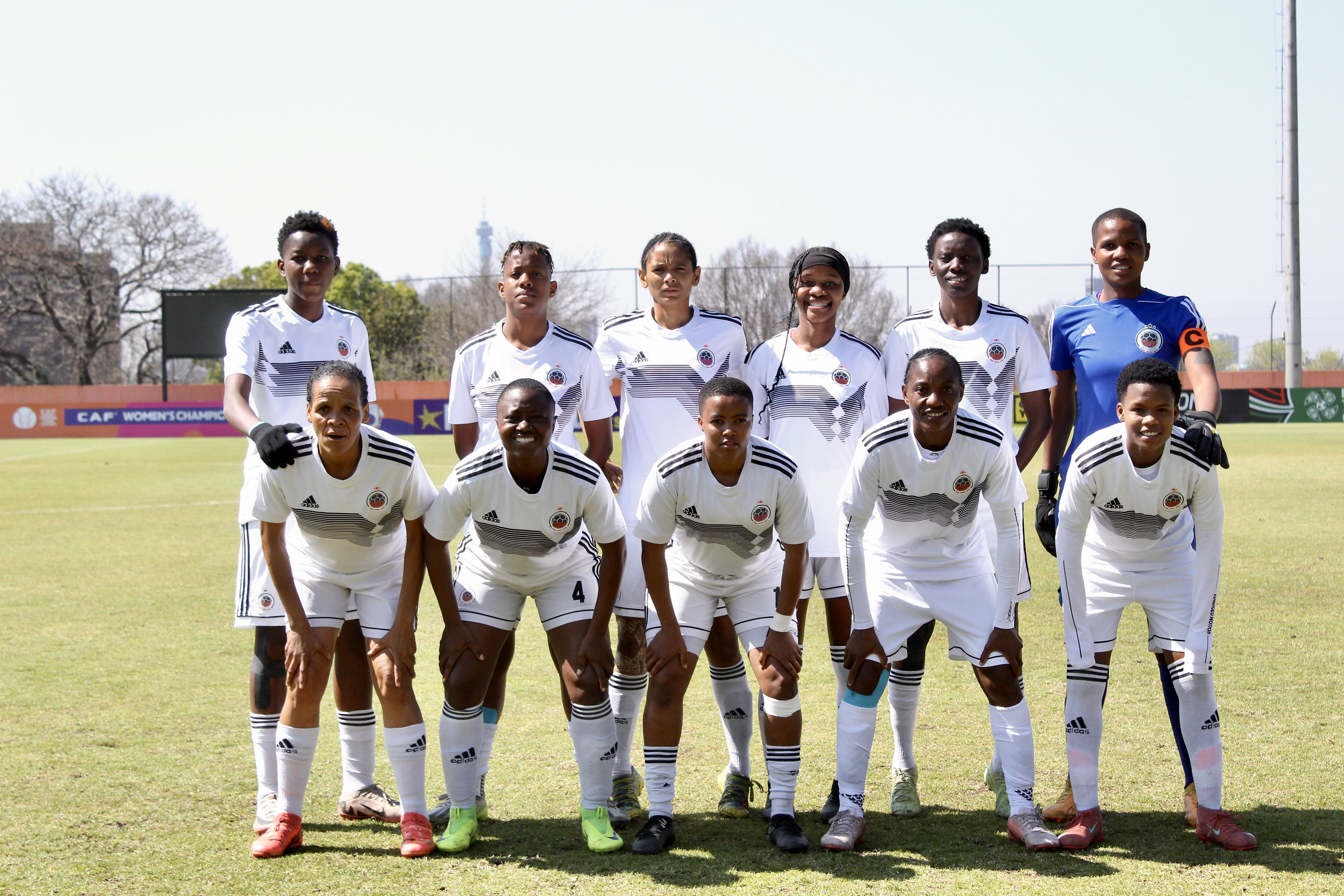
Beauties XI at the 2025 CAF Women's Champions League COSAFA Qualifiers against Ntopwa F.C.

They qualified for the maiden COSAFA Women's Champions League at the 2025 COSAFA Women's Champions League where they were drawn in group A. They lost their opening match 3–0 against ZESCO Ndola Girls from Zambia. They won their second match 3–0 against Ntopwa F.C. from Malawi. They ended the group third after losing their final match 7–0 against Mamelodi Sundowns from South Africa.

== Players ==
As of August 2025

Beauties F.C. squad for 2025 season.

Note: Flags indicate national team as defined under FIFA eligibility rules; some limited exceptions apply. Players may hold more than one non-FIFA nationality.

No.	Pos.	Nation	Player
1	GK	NAM	FENI MWALUNGA
3	DF	NAM	FRANSISKA GOMES
4	DF	NAM	UNONDJAMO KAETJAVI
5	MF	NAM	KAMUNIKIRE TJITUKA
6	MF	NAM	MARINA GAOXAS
7	MF	NAM	UTUZUVIRA MBAKONDJA KAHIRIRI
8	FW	NAM	AUNE AUNE ANDREAS
9	FW	NAM	HELENA NAAPOPYE AMWANDANGI
10	FW	NAM	RITA RIANA WILLIAMS
11	FW	NAM	FIOLA VLIETE
12	DF	NAM	ELVIDA SHAMILLA DAMASES
13	DF	NAM	NANCY BOIPELO LEBANG
15	MF	NAM	IYALOO ELMARY RISTO ROOI

No.	Pos.	Nation	Player
16	FW	NAM	TJINOTJINA GERTHAN TJAIMI
17	MF	NAM	MIRIAM NDAPANDULA MICHAEL
18	DF	NAM	MELISSA MATHEUS
19	FW	NAM	HILMA KANYAMA
20	DF	NAM	LEENA NAMUPALA ALWEENDO
21	MF	NAM	RAUNA NDINOSHISHO LAUDIKA UUGULU
22	MF	NAM	LYDIA MAVANZE SIMUMA
23	MF	NAM	IINA NDAPEWA KATUTA
24	MF	NAM	MILLICENT FEILICITY NATALIE HIKUAM
25	DF	NAM	ALETTA KOCK
26	GK	NAM	LORRAINE JOSSOB
27	FW	NAM	MEMORY NANDOVA

== Honours ==
- Namibia Women's Super League: 2005, 2006/7, 2007/8, 2009, 2024/25 ,runners-up: 2023/2024
