= COSAFA Women's Championship =

Southern African football tournament

- COSAFA Women's Championship logo
- Organiser(s): COSAFA
- Founded: 2002; 24 years ago
- Region: Southern Africa
- Teams: 14
- Related competitions: Women's Africa Cup of Nations
- Current champions: Namibia (1st title)
- Most championships: South Africa (7 titles)
- Broadcaster: COSAFA TV (YouTube)
- Website: www.cosafa.com
- 2026 COSAFA Women's Championship

The COSAFA Women's Championship is an association football tournament for teams from Southern Africa organised by Council of Southern Africa Football Associations (COSAFA). South Africa have won the most titles with seven wins. Namibia are the current champions. The next COSAFA Women's Championship has been moved to 2026 in South Africa from 18 February to 1 March.

== History ==
The following teams fall under the COSAFA region and participate in the tournament: Angola, Botswana, Comoros, Eswatini (Swaziland), Lesotho, Madagascar, Malawi, Mauritius, Mozambique, Namibia, Seychelles, South Africa, Zambia, and Zimbabwe.

== Format ==
The tournament begins with a group stage featuring four groups (two groups of four teams and two groups of three teams). The top team from each group progresses to the semifinals. The winners of the semifinals advanced to the final.

== Results ==
Edition	Year	Host	Final			Third place play-off or losing semi-finalists			Number of teams
Edition	Year	Host	Winner	Score	Runner-up	3rd Place	Score	4th Place	Number of teams
1	2002	Zimbabwe	South Africa	2–1	Zimbabwe	Zambia	1–0	Mozambique	8
2	2006	Zambia	South Africa	3–1	Namibia	Zambia	2–1	Zimbabwe	8
3	2008	Angola	South Africa	3–1	Angola	Namibia and | Zimbabwe			
4	2011; Details	Zimbabwe	Zimbabwe	1–0	South Africa	Tanzania	3–0	Malawi	8
5	2017; Details	Zimbabwe	South Africa	2–1	Zimbabwe	Zambia	1–1 (4–2 p)	Kenya^{G}	12
6	2018; Details	South Africa	South Africa	2–1	Cameroon^{G}	Uganda^{G}	1–0	Zambia	12
7	2019; Details	South Africa	South Africa	1–0	Zambia	Zimbabwe	3–0	Botswana	12
8	2020; Details	South Africa	South Africa	2–1	Botswana	Malawi and Zambia			10
9	2021; Details	South Africa	Tanzania^{G}	1–0	Malawi	Zambia	1–1 (4–3 p)	South Africa	12
10	2022; Details	South Africa	Zambia	1–0	South Africa B	Tanzania^{G}	2–1	Namibia	12
11	2023; Details	South Africa	Malawi	2–1	Zambia	Mozambique	2–0	Zimbabwe	12
12	2024; Details	South Africa	Zambia	0–0 (a.e.t.) (4–3 p)	South Africa	Malawi and Mozambique			14
13	2025; Details	South Africa	Namibia	2–1 (a.e.t.)	South Africa	Zambia	3–1	Zimbabwe	11

^{G}: Invited guest team, non COSAFA member.

== Summary ==
=== Performances by team ===
In most years there has been a match played by the losing semi-finalists to decide third/fourth places. However, in 2020 and 2024 the latter match was not played, so the teams are just shown as "semi-finalists". In 2008, it's unclear whether a third-place match was played.

Team	Winners	Runners-up	Third place	Fourth place	Semi-finalists
South Africa	7 (2002, 2006, 2008, 2017, 2018, 2019, 2020)	4 (2011, 2022, 2024, 2025)		1 (2021)	
Zambia	2 (2022, 2024)	2 (2019, 2023)	5 (2002, 2006, 2017, 2021, 2025)	1 (2018)	1 (2020)
Zimbabwe	1 (2011)	2 (2002, 2017)	1 (2019)	3 (2006, 2023, 2025)	1 (2008)
Malawi	1 (2023)	1 (2021)		1 (2011)	2 (2020, 2024)
Namibia	1 (2025)	1 (2006)		1 (2022)	1 (2008)
Tanzania	1 (2021)		2 (2011, 2022)		
Botswana		1 (2020)		1 (2019)	
Angola		1 (2008)			
Cameroon		1 (2018)			
Mozambique			1 (2023)	1 (2002)	1 (2024)
Uganda			1 (2018)		
Kenya				1 (2017)	

- Italic: hosts

=== Participating nations ===
Legend

- 1st – Champions
- 2nd – Runners-up
- 3rd – Third place
- 4th – Fourth place
- SF – Losing semi-finals, no 3rd-place match
- QF – Quarter-finals
- GS – Group stage
- Q — Qualified for upcoming tournament
- • – Did not qualify
- × – Withdrew
- – Hosts

Team	(Zimbabwe) 2002	(Zambia) 2006	(Angola) 2008	(Zimbabwe) 2011	(Zimbabwe) 2017	(South Africa) 2018	(South Africa) 2019	(South Africa) 2020	(South Africa) 2021	(South Africa) 2022	(South Africa) 2023	(South Africa) 2024	Years
Angola		GS	2nd				GS	GS	GS	GS	GS	GS	8
Botswana	GS			GS	GS	GS	4th	2nd	GS	GS	GS	GS	10
Comoros							GS	GS		GS	GS	GS	5
Eswatini	GS	GS	GS		GS	GS	GS	GS	GS	GS	GS	GS	11
Lesotho	GS	GS		GS	GS	GS		GS		GS	GS	GS	9
Madagascar					GS	GS	GS				GS	GS	5
Malawi	GS	GS		4th	GS	GS	GS	SF	2nd	GS	1st	SF	11
Mauritius					GS		GS			GS		GS	4
Mozambique	4th	GS	GS	GS	GS	GS	GS		GS	GS	3rd	SF	11
Namibia		2nd	SF		GS	GS	GS		GS	4th	GS	GS	9
Seychelles												GS	1
South Africa	1st	1st	1st	2nd	1st	1st	1st	1st	4th	2nd	GS	2nd	12
Zambia	3rd	3rd		GS	3rd	4th	2nd	SF	3rd	1st	2nd	1st	11
Zimbabwe	2nd	4th	SF	1st	2nd	GS	3rd	GS	GS		4th	GS	10
Invitee nations
Cameroon						2nd							1
Kenya					4th								1
South Sudan									GS				1
Tanzania				3rd				GS	1st	3rd			4
Uganda						3rd			GS				2
Total	8	9		8	12	12	12	10	12	12	12	14	

=== Top scorers ===
COSAFA members

Year	Player	Goals
2005	(South Africa) Portia Modise	6
2008	(South Africa) Noko Matlou	12
2011	(Zimbabwe) Rufaro Machingura	8
2017	(Zimbabwe) Rutendo Makore	10
2018	(South Africa) Linda Motlhalo	4
2019	(Zambia) Racheal Nachula	10
2020	(South Africa) Sibulele Holweni	8
2021	(South Africa) Sibulele Holweni	5
2022	(Zambia) Barbra Banda	10
2023	(Malawi) Temwa Chawinga	9
2024	(Zambia) Ochumba Lubandji (Zambia) Fridah Mukoma	4

== See also ==
- Africa Women Cup of Nations
- COSAFA Cup
