= 2011 COSAFA Women's Championship =

Tournament details
- Host country: Zimbabwe
- Dates: 2–8 July 2011
- Teams: 8 (from 1 confederation)

Final positions
- Champions: Zimbabwe (1st title)
- Runners-up: South Africa
- Third place: Tanzania
- Fourth place: Malawi

Tournament statistics
- Matches played: 12
- Goals scored: 52 (4.33 per match)
- Top scorer(s): (Zimbabwe) Rufaro Machingura (8 goals)
- Best player: (South Africa) Janine van Wyk
- Best goalkeeper: (Zimbabwe) Onai Chingawo
- Fair play award: Tanzania

The 2011 COSAFA Women's Championship was the 4th edition of the COSAFA Women's Championship. Zimbabwe and South Africa played in the final.

== Teams ==
Team	FIFA Rankings (March 2011)
Botswana	126
Lesotho	NR
Malawi	NR
Mozambique	NR
South Africa	58
Tanzania	123
Zambia	119
Zimbabwe	100

== Group stage ==
=== Group A ===
Team	Pld	W	D	L	GF	GA	GD	Pts
Zimbabwe	3	3	0	0	15	2	+13	9
Malawi	3	1	1	1	8	11	−3	4
Lesotho	3	1	0	2	5	11	−6	3
Mozambique	3	0	1	2	3	7	−4	1

2 July 2011

Malawi	1–1	Mozambique

Gwanzura, Harare
2 July 2011

Lesotho	0–4	Zimbabwe

Gwanzura, Harare

3 July 2011

Lesotho	3–2	Mozambique

Gwanzura, Harare
4 July 2011

Malawi	2–8	Zimbabwe

Gwanzura, Harare

5 July 2011

Lesotho	2–5	Malawi

Gwanzura, Harare
5 July 2011

Mozambique	0–3	Zimbabwe

Gwanzura, Harare

=== Group B ===
Team	Pld	W	D	L	GF	GA	GD	Pts
South Africa	3	3	0	0	9	1	+8	9
Tanzania	3	2	0	1	5	2	+3	6
Zambia	3	1	0	2	5	7	−2	3
Botswana	3	0	0	3	2	11	−9	0

2 July 2011

South Africa	4–1	Zambia

Gwanzura, Harare
2 July 2011

Botswana	1–3	Tanzania

Gwanzura, Harare

3 July 2011

Tanzania	2–0	Zambia
Rashid 22', 31'	Report

Gwanzura, Harare
3 July 2011

Botswana	0–4	South Africa
	Report	Dlamini 16'; Matlou 46'; Makhabane 70'; Sukazi 90'

Gwanzura, Harare

5 July 2011

Botswana	1–4	Zambia

Gwanzura, Harare
5 July 2011

South Africa	1–0	Tanzania
Sukazi 60'	Report

Gwanzura, Harare

== Knockout stage ==
=== Bracket ===
Semifinals
6 July
Zimbabwe (pen.)	0 (4)
Tanzania	0 (2)
6 July
South Africa	5
Malawi	1

Final
8 July
Zimbabwe	1
South Africa	0
Third place match
8 July
Tanzania	3
Malawi	0

=== Semifinals ===
6 July 2011

Zimbabwe	0–0	Tanzania
Penalties
	4–2

Harare

6 July 2011

South Africa	5–1	Malawi
Vilakazi 21'; Dlamini 24', 66'; Bafta 85'; Matlou 89' (pen.)		Chawinga 17'

Harare

=== Third place playoff ===
8 July 2011

Tanzania	3–0	Malawi

Harare

=== Final ===
8 July 2011

Zimbabwe	1–0	South Africa
Machingara 84'

Harare
