= Peter Mokaba Stadium =

Stadium in Polokwane, South Africa

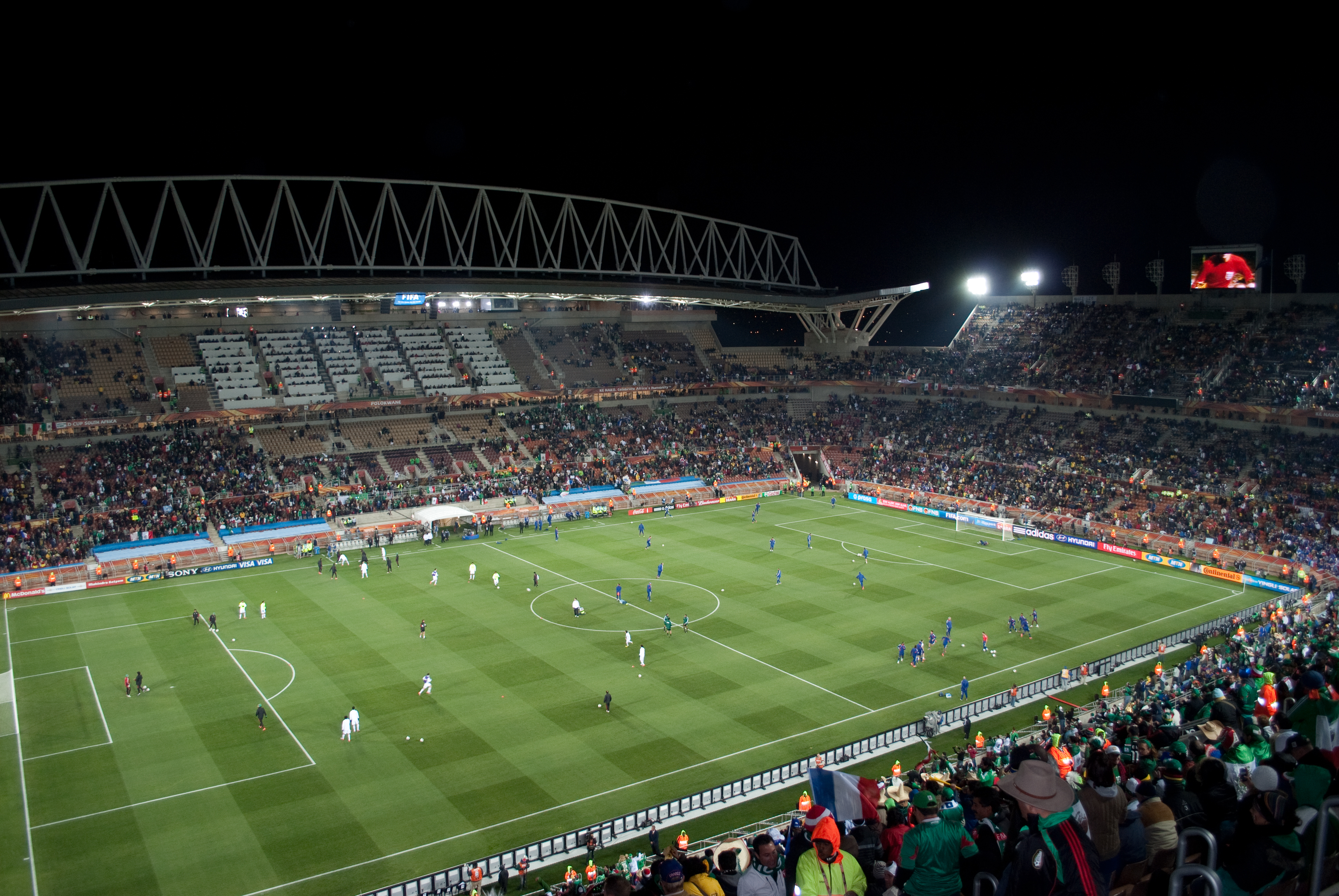
- Interactive map of Peter Mokaba Stadium
- Full name: Peter Mokaba Stadium
- Location: Magazyn St., Polokwane, South Africa
- Coordinates: 23°55′29″S 29°28′08″E
- Owner: City of Polokwane
- Capacity: 45,500
- Surface: Rye Grass with Desso GrassMaster

Construction
- Groundbreaking: 2006
- Built: 2007–2009
- Opened: 23 January 2010; 16 years ago
- Cost: Rand1.245 billion (US$150 million)
- Architect: AFL Architects

Tenant
- Sekhukhune United

The Peter Mokaba Stadium is a football and rugby union stadium in Polokwane (formerly Pietersburg), South Africa, that was used for the 2010 FIFA World Cup. It has a capacity to host 45,500 spectators but for the purposes of the 2010 FIFA World Cup the seating capacity was reduced to 41,733. It is named after Peter Mokaba, a former leader of the ANC Youth League. It is located just east of the older Peter Mokaba Stadium and 3 kilometers from the CBD.

The stadium is one of five stadiums that were built for the 2010 FIFA World Cup. Initial plans to upgrade the existing Old Peter Mokaba Stadium were abandoned in favour of the R1,245,000,000 new Peter Mokaba stadium.

Therefore, the natural grass has been reinforced with artificial fibers, which anchors the field into a stable and a level grass surface of Desso GrassMaster.

Although Peter Mokaba Stadium was completed in time for the 2010 FIFA World Cup, its original design included roof coverage over all spectator stands. Due to budget and construction considerations, only the western stand received full roof coverage, with the remainder of the stadium left with minimal overhead protection rather than the originally planned full canopy.

== 2010 FIFA World Cup ==
The stadium hosted four Group matches during the tournament of the 2010 FIFA World Cup.

Date	Time (SAST)	Team #1	Result	Team #2	Round	Attendance
13 June 2010	13:30	Algeria	0–1	Slovenia	Group C	30,325
17 June 2010	20:30	France	0–2	Mexico	Group A	35,370
22 June 2010	20:30	Greece	0–2	Argentina	Group B	38,891
24 June 2010	16:00	Paraguay	0–0	New Zealand	Group F	34,850

== Soccer ==
The first event at the stadium was the Peter Mokaba Cup, held on 23 January 2010. It was a four-team, friendly tournament, which served as the stadium's opening event. In the first semi-final, SuperSport United beat Danish side Brøndby 2–1. In the second semi-final, Kaizer Chiefs advanced after beating Wits 4–3 on penalties, after a goalless draw. Kaizer Chiefs defeated Supersport United 4–2 in the final.

The first international game played at the stadium was the international friendly between South Africa and Guatemala on 31 May 2010, which South Africa won 5–0. The match was the subject of controversy surrounding match-fixing involving the SAFA, the main referee, Ibrahim Chaibou of Niger and Singaporean criminal Wilson Raj Perumal. In January 2019, FIFA banned Chaibou for life after finding him guilty of corrupting results on behalf of Perumal's private company. Perumal was himself arrested in Finland over similar activities while the SAFA was sanctioned.

The stadium hosted its first competitive football match on 20 November 2010. Kaizer Chiefs opted to host their 2010–11 Telkom Knockout semi-final against Santos at the stadium. The match ended 1–0 to Kaizer Chiefs.

== Rugby ==
The stadium hosted its first rugby union match on 30 January 2010. The match was a Super 14 warm up match, played for the Xerox Cup. It was contested by the Bulls and Lions.

== Drainage ==
The stadium is regarded as having good drainage, with Polokwane Mayor John Mpe stating in April 2026 that the stadium had the best drainage in the country, and the third-best in Africa.

== See also ==
- List of association football stadiums by capacity
- Lists of stadiums
