= Old Peter Mokaba Stadium =

Building in Africa

- Interactive map of Old Peter Mokaba Stadium
- Location: Polokwane, South Africa
- Coordinates: 23°55′27″S 29°27′54″E
- Capacity: 15,000

Construction
- Opened: 1976

Tenants
- Polokwane City FC; Baroka FC; Magesi FC; Copperbelt Ladies FC

Old Peter Mokaba Stadium (previously Pietersburg Stadium) is a multi-purpose stadium in Polokwane (formerly Pietersburg), South Africa. It was the home stadium of Ria Stars football club before they were disbanded. The stadium can host 15,000 spectators and was built in 1976. The Peter Mokaba Stadium was constructed to the east of this stadium for the 2010 World Cup.

In January 2022, the stadium hosted the 110th anniversary celebration of the African National Congress.

== Criticism ==
In April 2025, Orlando Pirates coach José Riveiro criticised the state of the pitch after his club's victory at the ground, stating that "it is not a football ground" and that "it is always an ugly game when you play at the Old Peter Mokaba Stadium [and...] the shape of the field is terrible, slow, and bumpy. ".
