= 2014 African Women's Championship squads =

This article describes about the squads for the 2014 African Women's Championship.

== Group A ==
=== Ivory Coast ===
The squad was announced on 19 September 2014.

Head coach: Clémentine Touré

No.	Pos.	Player	Date of birth (age)	Caps	Club
1	GK	Lydie Saki	22 December 1984 (aged 29)		(Ivory Coast) Juventus Yopuogon
2	DF	Fatou Coulibaly	13 February 1987 (aged 27)		(Ivory Coast) Juventus Yopuogon
3	DF	Djelika Coulibaly	22 February 1984 (aged 30)		(Ivory Coast) Juventus Yopuogon
4	MF	Nina Kpaho	30 December 1996 (aged 17)		(Ivory Coast) Juventus Yopuogon
5	DF	Mariam Diakité	11 April 1995 (aged 19)		(Ivory Coast) ES Abobo
6	MF	Rita Akaffou	5 December 1986 (aged 27)		(Ivory Coast) Juventus Yopuogon
7	FW	Nadege Essoh	5 May 1990 (aged 24)		(Ivory Coast) Juventus Yopuogon
8	FW	Ines Nrehy	1 October 1993 (aged 21)		(Serbia) ŽFK Spartak Subotica
9	MF	Cecile Esmei	20 November 1991 (aged 22)		(Morocco) Subotika
10	FW	Ange N'Guessan	18 November 1990 (aged 23)		(Ivory Coast) Omness Dabou
11	FW	Rebecca Elloh	25 December 1994 (aged 19)		(Ivory Coast) Onze Soeurs Gagnoa
12	MF	Ida Guehai	15 July 1994 (aged 20)		(Ivory Coast) Onze Soeurs Gagnoa
13	DF	Fernande Tchetche	20 June 1988 (aged 26)		(Ivory Coast) Omness Dabou
14	FW	Josée Nahi	29 May 1989 (aged 25)		(Russia) Zvezda 2005 Perm
15	MF	Christine Lohoues	18 October 1992 (aged 21)		(Ivory Coast) Onze Soeurs Gagnoa
16	GK	Dominique Thiamale (c)	20 May 1982 (aged 32)		(Ivory Coast) Omness Dabou
17	MF	Nadège Cissé	4 April 1997 (aged 17)		(Ivory Coast) ES Abobo
18	MF	Sabine Nogbou	8 June 1990 (aged 24)		(France) US Saint-Maur
19	MF	Marie Yassi	7 November 1985 (aged 28)		(Morocco) Atlas 5 FC
20	DF	Chacoum Koutouan	29 October 1990 (aged 23)		(Ivory Coast) Stella Club
21	GK	Cynthia Djohore	2 December 1990 (aged 23)		(Ivory Coast) Onze Soeurs Gagnoa

=== Namibia ===
The squad was announced on 2 October 2014.

Head coach: Jaqueline Shipanga

No.	Pos.	Player	Date of birth (age)	Caps	Club
1	GK	Lydia Eixas	7 November 1986 (aged 27)		
2	GK	Susanna Eises	18 January 1991 (aged 23)		(Namibia) Okahandja Beauties
3	DF	Iina Katuta	16 December 1986 (aged 27)		(Namibia) JS Academy
4	DF	Uerikondjera Kasaona (c)	13 May 1987 (aged 27)		(Namibia) 21 Brigade United
5	MF	Lena Noreses	6 January 1994 (aged 20)		(Germany) Germania Hauenhorst
6	MF	Annouscka Kordom	12 August 1997 (aged 17)		(Namibia) JS Academy
7	DF	Twelikondjela Amukoto	28 July 1991 (aged 23)		
8	MF	Juliana Skrywer	28 December 1987 (aged 26)		(Namibia) Okahandja Beauties FC
9	MF	Thomalina Adams	6 July 1993 (aged 21)		(Germany) VfL Bochum
10	MF	Zenatha Coleman	25 September 1993 (aged 21)		(Namibia) JS Academy
11	FW	Elmarie Fredericks	11 August 1986 (aged 28)		(Namibia) Okahandja Beauties
12	FW	Rita Williams	15 August 1979 (aged 35)		
13	DF	Stacey Naris	24 February 1991 (aged 23)		(Germany) TuS Lipperode
14	DF	Lorraine Jossob	4 May 1993 (aged 21)		(Germany) Spfr. Neukirch
15	FW	Vistoria Shangula	21 April 1992 (aged 22)		(Namibia) JS Academy
16	GK	Agnes Kauzuu	7 July 1979 (aged 35)		(Namibia) UNAM Bokkies FC
17	MF	Memory Ngonda	11 February 1998 (aged 16)		(Namibia) SOS Children's Village FC
18	MF	Shirley Cloete	13 January 1982 (aged 32)		(Namibia) Okahandja Beauties FC
19	DF	Ester Amukwaya	18 January 1988 (aged 26)		(Namibia) UNAM Bokkies FC
20	MF	Lovisa Mulunga	18 March 1995 (aged 19)		(Namibia) JS Academy
21	DF	Veweziwa Kotjipati	28 September 1992 (aged 22)		(Germany) Tus Lipperode

=== Nigeria ===
The squad was announced on 30 September 2014.

Head coach: Edwin Okon

No.	Pos.	Player	Date of birth (age)	Caps	Club
1	GK	Precious Dede	18 January 1980 (aged 34)		(Nigeria) Ibom Queens
2	MF	Evelyn Nwabuoku (c)	14 November 1985 (aged 28)		(Nigeria) Rivers Angels
3	DF	Ngozi Ebere	5 August 1991 (aged 23)		(Nigeria) Rivers Angels
4	FW	Perpetua Nkwocha	3 January 1976 (aged 38)		(Sweden) Sunnanå SK
5	DF	Onome Ebi	5 August 1983 (aged 31)		(Belarus) FC Minsk
6	DF	Josephine Chukwunonye	19 March 1992 (aged 22)		(Nigeria) Rivers Angels
7	FW	Stella Mbachu	16 April 1978 (aged 36)		(Nigeria) Rivers Angels
8	FW	Asisat Oshoala	9 October 1994 (aged 20)		(Nigeria) Rivers Angels
9	FW	Desire Oparanozie	17 December 1993 (aged 20)		(France) En Avant de Guingamp
10	MF	Halimatu Ayinde	16 May 1995 (aged 19)		(Nigeria) Delta Queens
11	FW	Esther Sunday	13 March 1992 (aged 22)		(Belarus) FC Minsk
12	DF	Osinachi Ohale	21 December 1991 (aged 22)		(United States) Houston Dash
13	MF	Cecilia Nku	26 October 1992 (aged 21)		(Nigeria) Rivers Angels
14	FW	Francisca Ordega	19 October 1993 (aged 20)		(Sweden) Piteå IF
15	MF	Glory Iroka	3 January 1990 (aged 24)		(Nigeria) Rivers Angels
16	GK	Ibubeleye Whyte	9 January 1992 (aged 22)		(Nigeria) Rivers Angels
17	DF	Gloria Ofoegbu	3 January 1992 (aged 22)		(Nigeria) Rivers Angels
18	MF	Ngozi Okobi	14 December 1993 (aged 20)		(Nigeria) Delta Queens
19	MF	Martina Ohadugha	5 May 1991 (aged 23)		(Nigeria) Rivers Angels
20	DF	Ugo Njoku	27 November 1994 (aged 19)		(Nigeria) Rivers Angels
21	GK	Christy Ohiaeriaku	13 December 1996 (aged 17)		(Nigeria) Oshogbo Queens

=== Zambia ===
The squad was announced on 5 October 2014.

Head coach: Charles Bwale

No.	Pos.	Player	Date of birth (age)	Caps	Club
1	GK	Mirriam Katamanda	25 October 1991 (aged 22)		(Zambia) Red Arrows F.C.
2	DF	Grace Zulu	3 June 1995 (aged 19)		(Zambia) Bauleni Sports Academy
3	DF	Ethel Chama	7 August 1992 (aged 22)		(Zambia) Green Buffaloes F.C.
4	MF	Susan Banda	6 July 1990 (aged 24)		(Zambia) Red Arrows F.C.
5	MF	Mary Mwakapila	5 June 1995 (aged 19)		(Zambia) Bauleni Sports Academy
6	DF	Meya Banda	3 July 1991 (aged 23)		(Zambia) Green Buffaloes F.C.
7	MF	Misozi Zulu	11 October 1994 (aged 20)		(Zambia) National Assembly F.C.
8	FW	Lweendo Chisamu	25 February 1996 (aged 18)		(Zambia) Chibolya Queens
9	FW	Hellen Mubanga	23 May 1995 (aged 19)		(Zambia) Bauleni Sports Academy
10	FW	Noria Sosala	25 December 1988 (aged 25)		(Zambia) National Assembly F.C.
11	MF	Kabange Mupopo (c)	21 September 1992 (aged 22)		(Zambia) Green Buffaloes F.C.
12	MF	Esther Mukwasa	24 October 1996 (aged 17)		(Zambia) Moba Queens
13	MF	Justina Banda	1 February 1992 (aged 22)		(Zambia) Olympic Centre
14	MF	Racheal Lungu	15 April 1995 (aged 19)		(Zambia) Bauleni Sports Academy
15	MF	Annie Kibanji	13 May 1991 (aged 23)		(Zambia) Green Buffaloes F.C.
16	GK	Hazel Nali	4 April 1998 (aged 16)		(Zambia) Chibolya Queens
17	MF	Carol Howes	8 April 1984 (aged 30)		(Australia) Balcatta FC
18	FW	Nchawaka Saili	2 July 1996 (aged 18)		(Zambia) Bauleni Sports Academy
19	DF	Anita Mulenga	3 May 1995 (aged 19)		(Zambia) Green Buffaloes F.C.
20	DF	Emelda Musonda	29 November 1994 (aged 19)		(Zambia) Red Arrows F.C.
21	GK	Wendy Kunda	23 October 1997 (aged 16)		(Zambia) Mooba Queens

== Group B ==
=== Algeria ===
The squad was announced on 26 September 2014.

Head coach: Azzedine Chih

No.	Pos.	Player	Date of birth (age)	Caps	Club
1	GK	Kahina Takenint	21 May 1991 (aged 23)		(Algeria) AS Sûreté Nationale
2	FW	Houria Affak	11 July 1988 (aged 26)		(Algeria) ASE Alger Centre
3	DF	Houria Sedrati	19 March 1989 (aged 25)		(Algeria) FC Constantine
4	DF	Fatima Sekouane (c)	21 May 1983 (aged 31)		(Algeria) Afak Relizane
5	DF	Fatima Bara	21 February 1990 (aged 24)		(Algeria) ASE Alger Centre
6	DF	Fayrouz Benyoub	12 August 1995 (aged 19)		(France) AS Muret
7	MF	Nachida Laïfa	17 October 1982 (aged 31)		(Algeria) ASE Alger Centre
8	MF	Lydia Mounia Miraoui	24 September 1991 (aged 23)		(France) Claix Football Féminin
9	FW	Imene Merrouche	25 April 1994 (aged 20)		(Algeria) FC Constantine
10	DF	Habiba Sadou	1 November 1986 (aged 27)		(Algeria) AS Sûreté Nationale
11	MF	Kenza Hadjar	24 December 1992 (aged 21)		(Algeria) USF Béjaïa
12	DF	Kelthoum Arbi Aouda	25 September 1987 (aged 27)		(Algeria) Afak Relizane
13	FW	Mahbouba Bakkouche	29 April 1984 (aged 30)		(Algeria) JF Khroub
14	MF	Myriam Yasmine Benlazar	9 June 1995 (aged 19)		(France) Toulouse FC
15	MF	Fethia Bekhedda	9 July 1990 (aged 24)		(Algeria) Afak Relizane
16	GK	Asma Adda Chaïb	23 March 1991 (aged 23)		(Algeria) FC Constantine
17	MF	Siham Boutechiche	6 January 1980 (aged 34)		(Algeria) ASE Alger Centre
18	DF	Khadidja Khelifouche	23 May 1987 (aged 27)		(Algeria) ASE Alger Centre
19	FW	Naïma Bouhenni	23 October 1985 (aged 28)		(Algeria) Afak Relizane
20	FW	Sabrina Labiod	17 June 1986 (aged 28)		(France) AS Muret
21	GK	Nadia Mazouz	26 November 1988 (aged 25)		(Algeria) JF Khroub

=== Cameroon ===
The squad was announced on 4 October 2014.

Head coach: Enow Ngatchou

No.	Pos.	Player	Date of birth (age)	Caps	Club
1	GK	Annette Ngo Ndom	2 June 1985 (aged 29)		(Slovakia) Union Nové Zámky
2	FW	Christine Manie (c)	4 May 1984 (aged 30)		(Romania) CFF Olimpia Cluj
3	FW	Njoya Nkout	12 January 1993 (aged 21)		(Cameroon) AS Police
4	DF	Yvonne Leuko	20 November 1991 (aged 22)		(France) Arras Football
5	DF	Augustine Ejangue	19 January 1989 (aged 25)		(Norway) Amazon Grimstad
6	MF	Francine Zouga	9 November 1987 (aged 26)		(France) Montpellier HSC
7	FW	Gabrielle Onguene	25 February 1989 (aged 25)		(Cameroon) Louves Minproff
8	MF	Raissa Feudjio	29 October 1995 (aged 18)		(Turkey) Trabzonspor
9	FW	Madeleine Ngono Mani	16 October 1983 (aged 30)		(France) Claix Football Féminin
10	MF	Jeannette Yango	12 June 1993 (aged 21)		(France) FF Yzeure
11	MF	Adrienne Iven	9 March 1983 (aged 31)		(Cameroon) Louves Minproff
12	MF	Genevieve Ngo	10 March 1993 (aged 21)		(Cameroon) Caïman
13	DF	Cathy Bou Ndjouh	7 November 1987 (aged 26)		(Nigeria) Rivers Angels
14	MF	Balbine Mendoua	9 August 1993 (aged 21)		(Turkey) Ataşehir Belediyespor
15	DF	Ysis Sonkeng	20 September 1989 (aged 25)		(Cameroon) Louves Minproff
16	GK	Thècle Mbororo	24 September 1989 (aged 25)		(Cameroon) Panther Security
17	FW	Gaëlle Enganamouit	9 June 1992 (aged 22)		(Sweden) Eskilstuna United DFF
18	MF	Henriette Akaba	7 June 1992 (aged 22)		(Cameroon) Louves Minproff
19	DF	Rita Wanki Awachwi	6 January 1994 (aged 20)		(Cameroon) Locomotive FC
20	GK	Flore Enyegue	9 July 1991 (aged 23)		(Cameroon) AS Police
21	FW	Rose Bella	5 May 1994 (aged 20)		(Cameroon) AS Police

=== Ghana ===
The squad was announced on 27 September 2014.

Head coach: Yusif Basigi

No.	Pos.	Player	Date of birth (age)	Caps	Club
1	GK	Fafali Dumehasi	25 December 1993 (aged 20)		(Ghana) Police Accra
2	MF	Hillia Kobblah	7 July 1991 (aged 23)		(Ghana) Faith Ladies
3	MF	Mary Berko	1 June 1988 (aged 26)		(Ghana) Police Accra
4	DF	Janet Egyir	7 May 1992 (aged 22)		(Ghana) Hasaacas Ladies
5	FW	Faiza Ibrahim	22 March 1990 (aged 24)		(Ghana) Police Accra
6	FW	Elizabeth Cudjoe	17 October 1992 (aged 21)		(Ghana) Hasaacas Ladies
7	MF	Agnes Quaye	5 October 1989 (aged 25)		(Ghana) Immigration Accra
8	DF	Juliet Acheampong	11 July 1991 (aged 23)		(Ghana) Ashtown Ladies
9	FW	Samira Suleman	16 August 1991 (aged 23)		(Ghana) Hasaacas Ladies
10	DF	Grace Asare	27 October 1974 (aged 39)		(Ghana) Reformers Ladies
11	DF	Cynthia Adobea	1 August 1990 (aged 24)		(Ghana) Reformers Ladies
12	FW	Agnes Aduako	25 December 1989 (aged 24)		(Ghana) Fabulous Ladies
13	FW	Leticia Zikpi (c)	12 February 1986 (aged 28)		(Ghana) Immigration Accra
14	DF	Mercy Myles	2 May 1992 (aged 22)		(Ghana) Reformers Ladies
15	DF	Rosemary Ampem	27 August 1992 (aged 22)		(Ghana) Immigration Accra
16	GK	Nana Asantewaa	23 December 1993 (aged 20)		(Ghana) Police Accra
17	MF	Portia Boakye	17 April 1989 (aged 25)		(Ghana) Fabulous Ladies
18	MF	Mary Essiful	22 June 1993 (aged 21)		(Ghana) Soccer Intellectuals Ladies
19	FW	Diana Ankomah	19 September 1989 (aged 25)		(Ghana) Police Accra
20	DF	Linda Eshun	5 August 1992 (aged 22)		(Ghana) Hasaacas Ladies
21	GK	Patricia Mantey	27 August 1992 (aged 22)		(Ghana) Immigration Accra

=== South Africa ===
The squad was announced on 30 September 2014.

Head coach: Vera Pauw

No.	Pos.	Player	Date of birth (age)	Caps	Club
1	GK	Andile Dlamini	2 September 1992 (aged 22)		(South Africa) Mamelodi Sundowns F.C.
2	DF	Simphiwe Dludlu	21 September 1987 (aged 27)		(South Africa) TUKS Ladies FC
3	DF	Nothando Vilakazi	28 October 1988 (aged 25)		(South Africa) Palace Super Falcons
4	DF	Noko Matlou	30 September 1985 (aged 29)		(South Africa) Ma-Indies FC
5	DF	Janine Van Wyk (c)	17 April 1987 (aged 27)		(South Africa) JVW FC
6	MF	Mamello Makhabane	24 February 1988 (aged 26)		(South Africa) Palace Super Falcons
7	DF	Lebogang Mabatle	3 March 1992 (aged 22)		(South Africa) University of Pretoria F.C.
8	DF	Lebogang Ramalepe	3 December 1991 (aged 22)		(South Africa) Ma-Indies FC
9	MF	Amanda Dlamini	22 July 1988 (aged 26)		(South Africa) University of Johannesburg
10	FW	Silindile Ngubane	25 March 1987 (aged 27)		(South Africa) Durban Ladies FC
11	FW	Thembi Kgatlana	2 May 1996 (aged 18)		(South Africa) TUT
12	FW	Portia Modise	20 June 1983 (aged 31)		(South Africa) Croesus FC
13	DF	Gloria Thato	11 January 1989 (aged 25)		(South Africa) University of Pretoria F.C.
14	MF	Sanah Mollo	30 January 1987 (aged 27)		(South Africa) Mamelodi Sundowns F.C.
15	MF	Refiloe Jane	4 August 1992 (aged 22)		(South Africa) VUT Ladies
16	GK	Roxanne Barker	6 May 1991 (aged 23)		(Iceland) Þór/KA
17	MF	Leandra Smeda	22 July 1989 (aged 25)		(South Africa) UWC Ladies
18	MF	Mpumi Nyandeni	19 August 1987 (aged 27)		(South Africa) JVW FC
19	FW	Ode Fulutudilu	2 June 1990 (aged 24)		(South Africa) Spurs Ladies FC
20	FW	Shiwe Nongwanya	7 March 1994 (aged 20)		(South Africa) Bloemfontein Celtics Ladies
21	GK	Thokozile Mndaweni	8 August 1981 (aged 33)		(South Africa) Croesus FC
