= Namibia women's national football team results =

This article lists the results and fixtures for the Namibia women's national football team.

Nicknamed the "Brave Gladiators", the national team represents Namibia in international women's football. It is governed by the Namibia Football Association (NFA) and competes in tournaments organized by the Confederation of African Football (CAF) and the Council of Southern Africa Football Associations (COSAFA).

Established in 1992, the team played its first official match in January 1996 against a visiting German Tertiary Institutions side, suffering a 4–1 defeat under coach Rusten Mogane. Namibia's first international fixture came on 25 October 2003, when they were defeated 13–0 by South Africa's Banyana Banyana in the 2004 Olympic Games qualifiers. The team recorded its first victory at the 2006 COSAFA Championship, defeating Swaziland 6–0 on 23 August 2006, a result that remained their largest win for 13 years until an 8–0 victory over Mauritius. As of 7 August 2025, Namibia is ranked 123rd in the FIFA Women's World Rankings.

== Record per opponent ==
Key

Positive balance (more wins than losses)
Neutral balance (as many wins as losses)
Negative balance (more losses than wins)

The following table shows Namibia's all-time official international record per opponent:

Opponent	Pld	W	D	L	GF	GA	GD	Recent	W%
Algeria	2	2	0	0	5	2	+3	4 October 2014	100.0
Angola	7	3	3	1	10	7	+3	10 April 2021	42.9
Botswana	11	5	3	3	23	12	+11	9 April 2024	45.5
DR Congo	2	0	1	1	5	8	−3	10 March 2007	0.0
Equatorial Guinea	3	1	1	1	3	5	−2	18 July 2023	33.3
Eswatini	11	11	0	0	40	6	+34	26 February 2025	100.0
Ethiopia	1	1	0	0	1	0	+1	30 March 2014	100.0
Gambia	2	2	0	0	5	2	+3	24 September 2023	100.0
Ghana	4	1	0	3	3	9	−6	5 December 2023	25.0
Ivory Coast	1	0	0	1	1	3	−2	14 October 2014	0.0
Lesotho	5	3	1	1	10	6	+4	11 October 2023	60.0
Liechtenstein	2	1	1	0	3	1	+2	14 July 2024	50.0
Mauritius	1	1	0	0	8	0	+8	6 August 2019	100.0
Morocco	2	0	0	2	0	4	−4	31 October 2023	0.0
Mozambique	2	1	0	1	4	11	−7	4 May 2008	50.0
Nigeria	5	0	0	5	1	24	−23	17 October 2014	0.0
Seychelles	1	1	0	0	7	0	+7	25 October 2025	100.0
South Africa	9	0	0	9	9	32	−23	22 October 2024	0.0
Tanzania	5	2	0	3	8	12	−5	11 September 2022	40.0
Uganda	2	0	2	0	0	0	±0	30 September 2021	0.0
Zambia	10	1	5	4	11	17	−6	1 September 2022	10.0
Zimbabwe	7	1	0	6	2	12	−10	9 October 2023	14.3
Total	95	37	17	41	159	173	−14	26 February 2025	38.9

== Results ==
This section details the all-time record of the Namibia women's national team against other FIFA member national teams.

=== 2003 ===
25 October 2004 Olympic Games qualifying	South Africa	13–0	Namibia	Pretoria, South Africa
	Veronica Phewa x3; Jo-Anne Solomon x3; Mpumi Nyandeni x2; Lydia Monyepao x2; Jabulile Baloyi; Portia Modise; Antonia Carelse	Report

November 2004 Olympic Games qualifying	Namibia	0–8 (Note: The match result is disputed: South African sources report an 0–8 scoreline, while the article page lists it as 1–13. Namibian sources make no mention of this game, though they do record another encounter against South Africa at the same venue in 2004.)	South Africa	Windhoek
		Report		Stadium: Independence Stadium

=== 2006 ===
19 February 2006 African Championship qualifying	Mozambique	9–0	Namibia	Maputo, Mozambique

21 August 2006 COSAFA Championship GS	Zambia	2–2	Namibia	Lusaka, Zambia
	Noria Sosala 15'; Charity Mpongo 30'	Report	Queen Manga 3'; Mangulukeni Hamata 28'	Stadium: Woodlands Stadium

23 August 2006 COSAFA Championship GS	Namibia	6–0	Eswatini	Lusaka, Zambia
	Rita Williams 11'; Emmerencia Fredricks 21'; Bianca Fredrick 31'; Leandri Lucas : Susanna Eises 76'; Queen Manga 90' (pen.)	Report		Stadium: Woodlands Stadium

25 August 2006 COSAFA Championship SF	Zambia	1–1 (4–5 p)	Namibia	Lusaka, Zambia
	Martha Kapombo 90'	Report	Bianca Fredricks 8'	Stadium: Woodlands Stadium

26 August 2006 COSAFA Championship F	South Africa	3–1	Namibia	Lusaka, Zambia
	Portia Modise 30', 49'; Kylie Louw 38'	Report	Rita Williams 20'	Stadium: Woodlands Stadium

=== 2007 ===
26 January International friendly	Namibia	2–1	Zimbabwe	Windhoek
	Leandri Lucas 29', 51'	Report	Precious Mpala 68'	Stadium: SKW Stadium; Attendance: 500

27 January International friendly	Namibia	0–2	Zimbabwe	Windhoek
		Report	Precious Mpala 43'; Marilyn Magodzore 71'	Stadium: SKW Stadium

17 February 2008 Olympic Games qualifying	Namibia	3–3	DR Congo	Windhoek
	Leandri Lucas 7'; Stella Williams 56'; Juliana Skrywer 86'	Report	Yvonne Malembo 23'; Kiadli Wambo 39', 74'	Stadium: Sam Nujoma Stadium; Attendance: 1,500

10 March 2008 Olympic Games qualifying	DR Congo	5–2	Namibia	Kinshasa, DR Congo
	Yvonne Malembo 2', 76'; Odile Kuyangisa 14'; Youyou Kisita 20' (pen.); Tezi Lelo 23'	Report; Report	Bianca Fredericks 30'; Rita Williams 36'	Stadium: Stade des Martyrs

1 December 2008 African Championship qualifying	Botswana	0–3	Namibia	Gaborone, Botswana
		Report; Report	Leandri Lucas 17', 58'; Rejoice Kasaona 71'	Stadium: University of Botswana Stadium

15 December 2008 African Championship qualifying	Namibia	6–1	Botswana	Windhoek
14:00 CAT	Salame Iyambo 7', 16'; Rita Williams 33' (pen.), 43', 78'; Emma Awises 78'	Report	Tshepo Nkonyane 86'	Stadium: Sam Nujoma Stadium; Referee: Majo Kuda (Zimbabwe)

=== 2008 ===
22 February 2008 African Championship qualifying	Namibia	0–3	Nigeria	Windhoek
		Report	Rita Chikwelu 55'; Ifeanyi Chiejine 58'; Efioanwan Ekpo 65'	Stadium: Sam Nujoma Stadium

8 March 2008 African Championship qualifying	Nigeria	10–1	Namibia	Abuja, Nigeria
	Efioanwan Ekpo 12'; Perpetua Nkwocha 14', 30', 64'; Rita Chikwelu 20', 55'; Cynthia Uwak 46', 89'; Ifeanyi Chiejine 73'; Florence Ajayi 86'	Report	Leandri Lucas 79' (pen.)	Stadium: Abuja National Stadium

3 May 2008 COSAFA Championship GS	Namibia	4–0	Eswatini	Luanda, Angola

4 May 2008 COSAFA Championship GS	Namibia	4–2	Mozambique	Luanda, Angola

6 May 2008 COSAFA Championship GS	Angola	3–0	Namibia	Luanda, Angola

8 May 2008 COSAFA Championship SF	South Africa U20	2–1	Namibia	Luanda, Angola
		Report

=== 2009 ===
23 May International friendly	South Africa	5–3	Namibia	Pretoria, South Africa
		Report

20 June International friendly	Namibia	1–3	South Africa	Windhoek
15:00 CAT		Report		Stadium: Sam Nujoma Stadium

=== 2010 ===
7 March 2010 African Championship qualifying	Namibia	2–1	Angola	Windhoek
17:00 CAT	Thomalina Adams 73'; Lena Fredericks 85'	Report	Irene Gonçalves 37'	Stadium: Sam Nujoma Stadium; Referee: Diedre Mitchell (South Africa)

21 March 2010 African Championship qualifying	Angola	1–1	Namibia	Benguela, Angola
17:00 CAT	Irene Gonçalves 51'	Report	Emerencia Fredericks 87'	Stadium: Ombaka National Stadium; Referee: Pamela Chiwaya (Zimbabwe)

15 May International friendly	South Africa	4–1	Namibia	Katlehong, South Africa
	Noko Matlou 19'; Sana Mollo; Mamphasha Popela; Leandra Smeda	Report	Thomalina Adams	Stadium: Huntersfield Stadium

23 May 2010 African Championship qualifying	Namibia	1–5	Equatorial Guinea	Windhoek
17:00 CAT	Juliana Skrywer 3'	Report	Carol Carioca 19', 36'; Genoveva Añonma 25'; Salimata Simporé 42'; Gloria Chinasa 45+1'	Stadium: Sam Nujoma Stadium; Referee: Gladys Lengwe (Zambia)

=== 2011 ===
15 January 2012 Olympic Games qualifying	Angola	2–2	Namibia	Luanda, Angola
	Patricia x2			Stadium: Estádio dos Coqueiros

29 January 2012 Olympic Games qualifying	Namibia	0–0	Angola	Windhoek
				Stadium: Sam Nujoma Stadium

19 March International friendly	South Africa	2–1	Namibia	Upington, South Africa
	Noko Matlou 60'; Nocawe Skiti	Report; Report	Rejoice Kasaona	Stadium: Danie Kuys Stadium

26 March International friendly	Namibia	1–0	Botswana	Windhoek
	Shirley Cloete 75' (pen.)	Report		Stadium: Independence Stadium

3 April 2012 Olympic Games qualifying	Nigeria	7–0	Namibia	Abuja, Nigeria
17:00 CAT	Desire Oparanozie 3', 43'; Emueje Ogbiagbevha 5', 26'; Perpetua Nkwocha 13', 39'; Rita Chikwelu 50'	Report; Report		Stadium: Abuja National Stadium; Referee: Fadouma Dia (Senegal)

16 April 2012 Olympic Games qualifying	Namibia	0–2	Nigeria	Windhoek
16:00 CAT		Report; Report	Ebere Orji 15'; Stella Mbachu 31' (pen.)	Stadium: Sam Nujoma Stadium

=== 2012 ===
14 January 2012 African Championship qualifying	Namibia	0–2	Tanzania	Windhoek
17:00 CAT		Report	Asha Rashid 64'; Mwanahamisi Shurua 87'	Stadium: Sam Nujoma Stadium

29 January 2012 African Championship qualifying	Tanzania	5–2	Namibia	Dar es Salaam, Tanzania
	Mwanahamisi Shurua 21', 90'; Asha Rashid 47', 88'; Eto Mlenzi 84'	Report	Emmerencia Fredericks 30'; Juliana Skrywer 72'	Stadium: Benjamin Mkapa Stadium; Attendance: 15,000

=== 2013 ===
27 June International friendly	Namibia	2–1	Lesotho	Windhoek
15:00 CAT		Report		Stadium: Sam Nujoma Stadium

29 June International friendly	Namibia	3–3	Lesotho	Windhoek
14:30 CAT		Report		Stadium: Sam Nujoma Stadium

28 September International friendly	Namibia	5–0	Eswatini	Windhoek
	Ndapewa Katuta 23', 48'; Zenatha Coleman 25' (pen.); Anna Shikusho 82', 85'	Report		Stadium: NFA Technical Centre Field; Attendance: 200

29 November International friendly	Ghana U20	1–2	Namibia	Accra, Ghana
17:00 CAT	Unknown 40'	Report	Zenatha Coleman 52'; Thomalina Adams 74'	Stadium: Lizzy Sports Complex

=== 2014 ===
21 March International friendly	Namibia	1–3	Ghana	Windhoek
	Lovisa Mulunga 6'	Report	Samira Suleman x2; Agnes Aduako	Stadium: Hage Geingob Rugby Stadium

25 March International friendly	Namibia	0–3	Ghana	Windhoek
		Report	Agnes Aduako; Portia Boakye x2	Stadium: Sam Nujoma Stadium

30 March International friendly	Namibia	1–0	Ethiopia	Windhoek
16:00 CAT	Twelikondjela Amukoto 2'	Report		Stadium: Sam Nujoma Stadium

5 July International friendly	Namibia	1–2	South Africa	Windhoek
17:00 CAT	Thomalina Adams 84'	Report	Leandra Smeda 28'; Disebo Mametja 60'	Stadium: Sam Nujoma Stadium

10 August International friendly	South Africa	2–0	Namibia	Johannesburg, South Africa
17:00 CAT	Amanda Dlamini 3'; Leandra Smeda 62'	Report		Stadium: Dobsonville Stadium

20 August International friendly	Namibia	5–2	Botswana	Windhoek
17:00 CAT	Thomalina Adams 4' (pen.), 71', 79'; Rita Williams 30'; Lovisa Mulunga 40'	Report	Balothanyi Johannes 84'; Refilwe Tholakele 90+5'	Stadium: Sam Nujoma Stadium

1 October International friendly	Namibia	2–1	Algeria	Windhoek
17:00 CAT	Stella Williams 62'; Juliana Skrywer 87'	Report	Naïma Bouhani 80'	Stadium: Independence Stadium; Attendance: 0 (Behind closed doors)

4 October International friendly	Namibia	3–1	Algeria	Windhoek
17:00 CAT	Rita Williams 28'; Uerikondjera Kasaona 71'; Zenatha Coleman 82' (pen.)	Report	Habiba Sadou 89'	Stadium: NFA Technical Center Field

11 October 2014 African Championship GS	Namibia	2–0	Zambia	Windhoek
17:00 CAT	Rita Williams 4'; Thomalina Adams 21'	Report		Stadium: Sam Nujoma Stadium; Referee: Thérèse Neguel (Cameroon)

14 October 2014 African Championship GS	Ivory Coast	3–1	Namibia	Windhoek
20:00 CAT	Josée Nahi 13'; Ines Nrehy 84', 90'	Report	Zenatha Coleman 20'	Stadium: Sam Nujoma Stadium; Referee: Damaris Kimani (Kenya)

17 October 2014 African Championship GS	Namibia	0–2	Nigeria	Windhoek
17:00 CAT		Report	Gloria Ofoegbu 36'; Francisca Ordega 38'	Stadium: Sam Nujoma Stadium; Referee: Lilia Abdeljaoued (Tunisia)

=== 2015 ===
21 March International friendly	Namibia	6–2	Eswatini	Windhoek
16:00 CAT	Zenatha Coleman 8'; Juliana Skrywer 19'; Anna Shikusho 29'; Lorraine Jossob 56'; Memory Ngonda 72'; Lovisa Mulunga 90+1'	Report	Nobuhle Mdluli 25'; Celiwe Nkambule 75'	Stadium: Independence Stadium

=== 2016 ===
6 March 2016 WAFCON qualifying	Zambia	3–1	Namibia	Lusaka, Zambia
15:00 CAT	Noria Sosala 3', 45+2'; Grace Chanda 22'	Report	Lorraine Jossob 89'	Stadium: Nkoloma Stadium; Referee: Maria Rivet (Mauritius)

18 March 2016 WAFCON qualifying	Namibia	2–2	Zambia	Windhoek
17:00 CAT	Zenatha Coleman 48', 78' (pen.)	Report	Grace Chanda 3', 46'	Stadium: Sam Nujoma Stadium; Referee: Tania Duarte (Angola)

=== 2017 ===
26 August International friendly	Namibia	3–2	Eswatini	Windhoek
15:00 CAT	Anna Shikusho 25', 28'; Twelikondjela Amukoto 39'	Report	Celiwe Nkambule 76'; Nqobile Dlamini 90+3' (pen.)	Stadium: NFA Technical Center Field

13 September 2017 COSAFA Championship GS	Namibia	4–0	Botswana	Bulawayo, Zimbabwe
10:30 CAT	Vistoria Shangula 16', 43'; Zenatha Coleman 41' (pen.); Anna Shikusho 87'	Report		Stadium: Barbourfields Stadium

15 September 2017 COSAFA Championship GS	South Africa	3–1	Namibia	Bulawayo, Zimbabwe
16:30 CAT	Thembi Kgatlana 5', 88'; Chantelle Esau 13'	Report	Juliana Blou 37'	Stadium: Barbourfields Stadium

17 September 2017 COSAFA Championship GS	Namibia	1–2	Lesotho	Bulawayo, Zimbabwe
16:30 CAT	Anna Shikusho 4' (pen.)	Report	Boitumelo Rabale 22', 54'	Stadium: Barbourfields Stadium

=== 2018 ===
5 April 2018 WAFCON qualifying	Namibia	0–2	Zimbabwe	Windhoek
18:00 CAT		Report	Marjory Nyaumwe 21'; Mavis Chirandu 89'	Stadium: Sam Nujoma Stadium; Referee: Chancelle Ngakossa (Congo)

8 April 2018 WAFCON qualifying	Zimbabwe	2–0	Namibia	Harare, Zimbabwe
15:00 CAT	Emmaculate Msipa 73'; Mavis Chirandu 84'	Report		Stadium: Rufaro Stadium; Referee: Carolyne Wanjala (Kenya)

13 September 2018 COSAFA Championship GS	Zimbabwe	1–0	Namibia	Ibhayi, South Africa
10:00 CAT	Marjory Nyaumwe 18'	Report		Stadium: Isaac Wolfson Stadium

15 September 2018 COSAFA Championship GS	Namibia	0–0	Uganda	Ibhayi, South Africa
13:00 CAT		Report		Stadium: Isaac Wolfson Stadium

17 September 2018 COSAFA Championship GS	Eswatini	1–4	Namibia	Port Elizabeth, South Africa
13:00 CAT	Celiwe Nkambule 90'	Report	Kylie van Wyk 5'; Iina Katuta 7', 34'; Lovisa Mulunga 43'	Stadium: Gelvandale Stadium

=== 2019 ===
5 April 2020 Olympic Games qualifying	Botswana	1–0	Namibia	Gaborone, Botswana
18:00 CAT	Refilwe Tholakele 81'	Report		Stadium: Botswana National Stadium

9 April 2020 Olympic Games qualifying	Namibia	2–2	Botswana	Windhoek
18:30 CAT	Lovisa Mulunga 3'; Zenatha Coleman 41'	Report	Nondi Mahlasela 10', 52'	Stadium: Sam Nujoma Stadium

1 August 2019 COSAFA Championship GS	Namibia	0–1	Botswana	Ibhayi, South Africa
15:30 CAT		Report	Michelle Abueng 44'	Stadium: Wolfson Stadium

3 August 2019 COSAFA Championship GS	Zambia	3–2	Namibia	Ibhayi, South Africa
10:00 CAT	Hellen Mubanga 37', 76'; Mary Mwakapila 60'	Report	Zenatha Coleman 42' (pen.); Annouscka Kordom 79'	Stadium: Wolfson Stadium

6 August 2019 COSAFA Championship GS	Namibia	8–0	Mauritius	Port Elizabeth, South Africa
15:30 CAT	Zenatha Coleman 3', 48', 74', 75'; Beverly Uueziua 24'; Anna Shikusho 30'; Lorraine Jossob 45'; Lovisa Mulunga 88'	Report		Stadium: Gelvandale Stadium

=== 2021 ===
7 April International friendly	Namibia	4–0	Angola	Windhoek
15:30 CAT	Thomalina Adams 22' (pen.); Zenatha Coleman 36', 57'; Millicent Hikuam 65'	Report		Stadium: Sam Nujoma Stadium; Referee: Vistoria Shangula (Namibia)

10 April International friendly	Namibia	1–0	Angola	Windhoek
15:30 CAT	Emma Naris 76'	Report		Stadium: Sam Nujoma Stadium; Referee: Antsino Twanyanyukwa (Namibia)

30 September 2021 COSAFA Championship GS	Namibia	0–0	Uganda	Gqeberha, South Africa
12:00 CAT		Report		Stadium: NMU Stadium; Referee: Ema Novo (Mozambique)

5 October 2021 COSAFA Championship GS	Zambia	3–0	Namibia	Gqeberha, South Africa
15:30 CAT	Margaret Belemu 45+1'; Grace Chanda 66'; Mary Wilombe 84'	Report		Stadium: NMU Stadium; Referee: Akhona Makalima (South Africa)

5 October 2021 COSAFA Championship GS	Namibia	1–0	Eswatini	Gqeberha, South Africa
15:30 CAT	Lovisa Mulunga 34'	Report		Stadium: NMU Stadium; Referee: Itumeleng Methikga (Botswana)

20 October 2022 WAFCON qualifying	Tanzania	1–2	Namibia	Dar es Salaam, Tanzania
15:00 CAT	Stumai Athumani 41'	Report	Zenatha Coleman 22', 61'	Stadium: Benjamin Mkapa Stadium; Referee: Lidya Tafesse (Ethiopia)

23 October 2022 WAFCON qualifying	Namibia	3–2	Tanzania	Johannesburg, South Africa
15:30 CAT	Zenatha Coleman 16', 21', 43'	Report	Mwanahamisi Shurua 8'; Opa Clement 58'	Stadium: Dobsonville Stadium; Referee: Nteboheleng Setoko (Lesotho)

=== 2022 ===
16 February 2022 WAFCON qualifying	Zambia	0–0	Namibia	Lusaka, Zambia
15:00 CAT		Report		Stadium: Nkoloma Stadium; Referee: Letticia Viana (Eswatini)

22 February 2022 WAFCON qualifying	Namibia	1–1	Zambia	Johannesburg, South Africa
15:00 CAT	Emma Naris 6'	Report	Siomara Mapepa 70'	Stadium: Dobsonville Stadium; Referee: Akhona Makalima (South Africa)

1 September 2022 COSAFA Championship GS	Zambia	2–0	Namibia	Gqeberha, South Africa
15:30 CAT	Barbra Banda 4', 71'	Report		Stadium: Nelson Mandela Bay Stadium; Referee: Rosalie (Madagascar)

4 September 2022 COSAFA Championship GS	Namibia	5–1	Eswatini	Gqeberha, South Africa
12:00 CAT	Ivone Kooper 22', 70'; Memory Ngonda 25'; Veweziwa Kotjipati 74'; Zenatha Coleman 90+5' (pen.)	Report	Sisanda Ndzinisa 45'	Stadium: Madibaz Stadium; Referee: Itumeleng Methikga (Botswana)

6 September 2022 COSAFA Championship GS	Lesotho	0–2	Namibia	Gqeberha, South Africa
12:00 CAT		Report	Memory Ngonda 17'; Zenatha Coleman 53'	Stadium: Madibaz Stadium; Referee: Rosalie (Madagascar)

9 September 2022 COSAFA Championship SF	South Africa B	1–0	Namibia	Ibhayi, South Africa
15:00 CAT	Lithemba Sam-Sam 82'	Report		Stadium: Isaac Wolfson Stadium; Referee: Itumeleng Methikga (Botswana)

11 September 2022 COSAFA Championship 3rd	Tanzania	2–1	Namibia	Ibhayi, South Africa
12:00 CAT	Christer Bahera 12'; Emma Naris 88' (o.g.)	Report	Aisha Mnunka 20' (o.g.)	Stadium: Isaac Wolfson Stadium; Referee: Rosalie (Madagascar)

30 September International friendly	Botswana	2–1	Namibia	Gaborone, Botswana
16:30 CAT	Gaonyadiwe Ontlametse 18'; Nondi Mahlasela 38'	Report	Ivone Kooper 49'	Stadium: Botswana National Stadium

=== 2023 ===
13 July 2024 Olympic Games qualifying	Namibia	2–0	Equatorial Guinea	Nasrec, South Africa
15:00 CAT	Zenatha Coleman 34'; Ivone Kooper 55'	Report		Stadium: FNB Stadium; Referee: Gloria Sambumba (Zambia)

18 July 2024 Olympic Games qualifying	Equatorial Guinea	0–0	Namibia	Malabo, Equatorial Guinea
17:00 CAT		Report		Stadium: Estadio de Malabo

21 September 2024 WAFCON qualifying	Gambia	2–3	Namibia	El Jadida, Morocco
19:00 CAT	Fatou Kanteh 24', 59' (pen.)	Report	Lovisa Mulunga 14'; Ivone Kooper 19'; Zenatha Coleman 75'	Stadium: Ben M'Hamed El Abdi Stadium

24 September 2024 WAFCON qualifying	Namibia	2–0	Gambia	El Jadida, Morocco
16:00 CAT	Zenatha Coleman 15', 37'	Report		Stadium: Ben M'Hamed El Abdi Stadium

6 October 2023 COSAFA Championship GS	Namibia	1–1	Botswana	Pretoria, South Africa
15:30 CAT	Millicent Hikuam 6'	Report	Kesegofetse Mochawe 79'	Stadium: Lucas Moripe Stadium; Referee: Gloria Sambumba (Zambia)

9 October 2023 COSAFA Championship GS	Namibia	0–2	Zimbabwe	Johannesburg, South Africa
15:30 CAT		Report	Rudo Neshamba 18'; Nobukhosi Ncube 57'	Stadium: Dobsonville Stadium; Referee: Letticia Viana (Eswatini)

11 October 2023 COSAFA Championship GS	Namibia	2–0	Lesotho	Soweto, South Africa
15:30 CAT	Emma Naris 35'; Ivone Kooper 74'	Report		Stadium: UJ Stadium; Referee: Maria Rivet (Mauritius)

26 October 2024 Olympic Games qualifying	Namibia	0–2	Morocco	Marrakesh, Morocco
20:00 CAT		Report	Nesryne El Chad 20'; Anissa Lahmari 78'	Stadium: Stade de Marrakech

31 October 2024 Olympic Games qualifying	Morocco	2–0	Namibia	Rabat, Morocco
20:00 CAT	Imane Saoud 76'; Ghizlane Chebbak 89' (pen.)	Report		Stadium: Moulay Hassan Stadium

1 December 2024 WAFCON qualifying	Ghana	3–1	Namibia	Accra, Ghana
17:30 CAT	Doris Boaduwaa 26', 58'; Portia Boakye 37'	Report	Portia Boakye 69' (o.g.)	Stadium: Accra Sports Stadium; Referee: Ghada Mehat (Algeria)

5 December 2024 WAFCON qualifying	Namibia	1–0	Ghana	Pretoria, South Africa
15:00 CAT	Lydiana Nanamus 15'	Report		Stadium: Lucas Moripe Stadium; Referee: Tatu Malogo (Tanzania)

=== 2024 ===
9 April International friendly	Botswana	1–1	Namibia	Gaborone, Botswana
16:00 CAT	Leungo Senwelo 24'; Mokgabo Thanda (yellow card) 66'	Report	Zenatha Coleman 38'; Lina Katuta (yellow card) 59'; Juliana Blou (yellow card) 62'	Stadium: Royal Aria Stadium

11 July International friendly	Liechtenstein	1–1	Namibia	Ruggell, Liechtenstein
18:00 CAT	Salomé Stampfli 78'	Report	Twelikondjela Amukoto 14'	Stadium: Freizeitpark Widau; Attendance: 200; Referee: Déborah Anex (Switzerland)

14 July International friendly	Liechtenstein	0–2	Namibia	Ruggell, Liechtenstein
10:00 CAT		Report	Utuzuvira Kahiriri 22'; Memory Ngonda 37'	Stadium: Freizeitpark Widau; Attendance: 300; Referee: Désirée Grundbacher (Switzerland)

22 October 2024 COSAFA Championship GS	South Africa B	1–0	Namibia	Gqeberha, South Africa
17:00 CAT	Tshogofatso Motlogelwa 84'	Report		Stadium: Nelson Mandela Bay Stadium; Referee: Thanks Nyahuye (Zimbabwe)

25 October 2024 COSAFA Championship GS	Namibia	7–0	Seychelles	Ibhayi, South Africa
12:00 CAT	Twelikondjele Amukoto 6'; Fiola Vliete 29', 30', 51'; Ivone Kooper 62', 90'; Zenatha Coleman 76' (pen.)	Report		Stadium: Isaac Wolfson Stadium; Referee: Eness Gumbo (Malawi)

28 October 2024 COSAFA Championship GS	Eswatini	0–2	Namibia	Ibhayi, South Africa
15:00 CAT		Report	Zenatha Coleman 12', 66'	Stadium: Isaac Wolfson Stadium; Referee: Gloria Sambumba (Zambia)

=== 2025 ===
21 February 2026 WAFCON qualifying	Eswatini	0–3	Namibia	Lobamba, Eswatini
15:00 CAT		Report	Fiola Vliete 2'; Ivone Kooper 18'; Hilma Kanyama 90+4'	Stadium: Somhlolo National Stadium; Referee: Suavis Iratunga (Burundi)

26 February 2026 WAFCON qualifying	Namibia	1–0	Eswatini	Johannesburg, South Africa
15:00 CAT	Juliana Blou 3'	Report		Stadium: Dobsonville Stadium
