= Meya =

Meya may refer to:

- Anderson Sunda-Meya, Congolese–American physicist
- Avice Meya (born 1994), Ugandan swimmer
- Luis Meya (born 1951), Spanish water polo player
- Meya Banda (born 1991), Zambian football player
- Nicolas Bayona Ba Meya (1938–1998), Congolese jurist
