= Cayuela (surname) =

Cayuela is a Spanish surname. Notable people with the surname include:

- Antonio Cayuela (1917–2006), Spanish footballer
- Aquilino Cayuela (born 1967), Spanish writer, columnist, and professor
- Emilio Sánchez Cayuela (1907–1993), Spanish painter and draftsman
- Jorge Cayuela (born 1944), Spanish footballer
- Javier Cayuela, Spanish sailor
- Pepe Cayuela (born 1950), Spanish football manager
- Vicente Maeso Cayuela (1919–1993), Spanish painter and sculptor

== See also ==
- Cayuela, a municipality located in the province of Burgos, Castile and León, Spain
