= Esty Amukwaya =

Namibian footballer (born 1988)

Personal information
- Date of birth: 1988 (age 37–38)
- Place of birth: Namibia
- Position: Centre-back

Senior career*
Years	Team	Apps	(Gls)
- UNAM Bokkies

International career^{‡}
2012–20??	Namibia	2+	(0+)
- * Club domestic league appearances and goals as of 14 April 2013 ‡ National team caps and goals as of 14 April 2013

Esty Amukwaya (born 1988) is a Namibian footballer who plays as a centre-back. She competed in the Namibia Women's Super League for UNAM Bokkies and was an important member of the Namibia women's national team (The Brave Gladiators).

Amukwaya can also play as a central defender, goalkeeper and central midfielder. She wears number 15 for the Bokkies and number 14 for national games.

Amukwaya is a big fan of former Brave Warriors striker Gerros Witbeen. She played four matches for the Brave Gladiators, two against Tanzania in the 2012 African Women Championship qualifiers and two against the visiting German national student team.

== Club career ==
=== UNAM Bokkies FC ===
In the WSL she was voted as the best defender in the league over the past few years and last season (2011/2012) she was nominated among the best players of the season which was taken by Lovisa Mulunga of JS Academy. Jacqui Shipanga Academy as the team is known are the 2011/12 NFA Women Super League Champions. Esty's UNAM Bokkies finished fifth in the 2011/2012 season, the league had six teams in total, including former dominant champions Okahandja Beauties. Other teams that competed in the NFA Women Super Leagues are Poly Babes, 21 Brigade United and Challengers. The league is said to expand in the 2012/2013 season to make it more competitive.

== Brave Gladiators ==
In 2012, she made her National debut against Tanzania in the African Women Championship qualifiers.
