= Saili =

Saili is both a surname and a given name. Notable people with the name include:

- Francis Saili (born 1991), New Zealand rugby player, centre for Harlequins
- Monica Saili (born 1997), Samoan swimmer
- Nchawaka Saili (born 1996), Zimbabwean football player
- Peter Saili (born 1988), New Zealand rugby player, flanker for Bordeaux
- Sharyce Saili (born 1982), Zimbabwean cricketer
