= Wintertime (disambiguation) =

Wintertime is the coldest season of the year in polar and temperate zones.

Wintertime or winter time may also refer to:

- Standard time, the time without the offset for daylight saving time which is also known as summer time
- Winter time (clock lag), lagging the clock from the standard time during winter
- Wintertime (film), a 1943 American film
- "Wintertime", a single by Kayak from the 1974 album Kayak II
- "Winter Time" (song), from the Sabrina Claudio album Christmas Blues
- "Winter Time", a song on the 1977 Steve Miller Band album Book of Dreams
- several volumes of the manga series Silver Spoon

== See also ==
- Winter (disambiguation)
