= Marie Yassi =

Ivorian footballer (born 1985)

Personal information
- Full name: Marie Claire Yassi
- Date of birth: 7 November 1985 (age 40)
- Place of birth: Cocody, Ivory Coast
- Position: Midfielder

Senior career*
Years	Team	Apps	(Gls)
- Atlas 5 FC

International career^{‡}
- Ivory Coast
- * Club domestic league appearances and goals ‡ National team caps and goals as of 11 october 2014 (before the 2014 African Women's Championship)

Marie Yassi (born 7 November 1985) is an Ivorian footballer who plays as a midfielder for the Ivory Coast women's national football team. She was part of the team at the 2014 African Women's Championship. On club level she played for Atlas 5 FC in Morocco.

== See also ==
- 2014 African Women's Championship squads
- List of Ivory Coast women's international footballers
