= Lena Noreses =

Namibian footballer (born 1994)

Personal information
- Date of birth: 6 January 1994 (age 32)
- Place of birth: Windhoek, Namibia
- Position: Midfielder

Senior career*
Years	Team	Apps	(Gls)
- Germania Hauenhorst

International career^{‡}
- Namibia
- * Club domestic league appearances and goals ‡ National team caps and goals as of 11 october 2014 (before the 2014 African Women's Championship)

Lena Noreses (born 6 January 1994) is a Namibian footballer who plays as a midfielder for the Namibia women's national team. She was part of the team at the 2014 African Women's Championship. On a club level she played for Germania Hauenhorst in Germany.
