= Carol Howes =

Zambian footballer (born 1984)

Personal information
- Date of birth: 8 April 1984 (age 42)
- Position: Forward

Senior career*
Years	Team	Apps	(Gls)
- Balcatta FC

International career^{‡}
- Zambia
- * Club domestic league appearances and goals ‡ National team caps and goals as of 11 october 2014 (before the 2014 African Women's Championship)

Carol Howes (born 8 April 1984) is a Zambian footballer who is a forward for the Zambia women's national football team. She was part of the team at the 2014 African Women's Championship. At the club level, she played for Balcatta FC in Australia.
