= Vistoria Shangula =

Namibian footballer (born 1992)

Personal information
- Date of birth: 21 April 1992 (age 34)
- Position: Forward

Senior career*
Years	Team	Apps	(Gls)
- JS Academy

International career^{‡}
- Namibia
- * Club domestic league appearances and goals ‡ National team caps and goals as of 11 October 2014 (before the 2014 African Women's Championship)

Vistoria Shangula (born 21 April 1992) is a Namibian footballer who plays as a forward for the Namibia women's national team. She was part of the team at the 2014 African Women's Championship. On club level she played for JS Academy in Namibia.
