= Pontifical Gregorian University =

Pontifical university located in Rome, Italy

- Pontificia Università Gregoriana
- Latin: Pontificia Universitas Gregoriana
- Other name: The Greg
- Motto: Religioni et Bonis Artibus
- Motto in English: For Religion and Culture
- Type: Private pontifical university
- Established: 23 February 1551 (475 years ago)
- Religious affiliation: Catholic (Jesuit)
- Chancellor: José Tolentino de Mendonça
- Rector: Mark Lewis, SJ
- Academic staff: 304
- Students: 2,754 (2018–19)
- Location: Rome, Italy; 41°53′56″N 12°29′5″E
- Website: https://unigre.it/

The Pontifical Gregorian University (Italian: Pontificia Università Gregoriana), also known as the Gregorian or Gregoriana, is a private pontifical university in Rome, Italy. Gregorian’s alumni include 17 popes and 72 saints and beatified individuals.

The Gregorian originated as a part of the Roman College, founded in 1551 by Ignatius of Loyola, and included all grades of schooling. Its chairs of philosophy and theology received papal approval in 1556, making it the first institution founded by the Society of Jesus (Jesuits). In 1584, the Roman College was given a new home by Pope Gregory XIII, after whom it was renamed the Gregorian University.

It had distinguished scholars in ecclesiastical fields as well as in natural science and mathematics. Only the theology and philosophy departments of the Gregorian survived the political turmoil in Italy after 1870.

The university's alumni include 17 popes, the highest in comparison to other universities. Today the Gregorian has an international faculty and around 2,750 students from over 150 countries.

== History ==
=== Founding ===
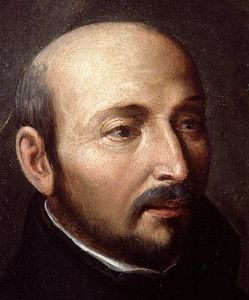
Ignatius of Loyola

Ignatius of Loyola, the founder of the Society of Jesus, established a School of Grammar, Humanities, and Christian Doctrine (Scuola di grammatica, d'umanità e di Dottrina cristiana) in Rome on 18 February 1551. It was located in a building at the base of the Capitoline Hill, on what is today the Piazza d'Aracoeli. Francis Borgia, the viceroy of Catalonia and a Catholic patron, provided financial support for the new school.

With a small library connected to it, the school was called the Roman College (Collegio Romano). In September 1551, due to its increased enrollment, the college moved to a larger facility behind the Santo Stefano del Cacco Church in Rome. After only two years of operation, the Roman College had 250 graduates.

=== Early growth ===
In January 1556, Pope Paul IV authorized the Roman College to confer academic degrees in theology and philosophy, elevating it to the rank of a university. During the following 20 years, ever increasing enrollment forced the college to twice move to larger facilities. During this period, the college added chairs in moral philosophy and Arabic to the existing chairs in Latin, Greek, and Hebrew.

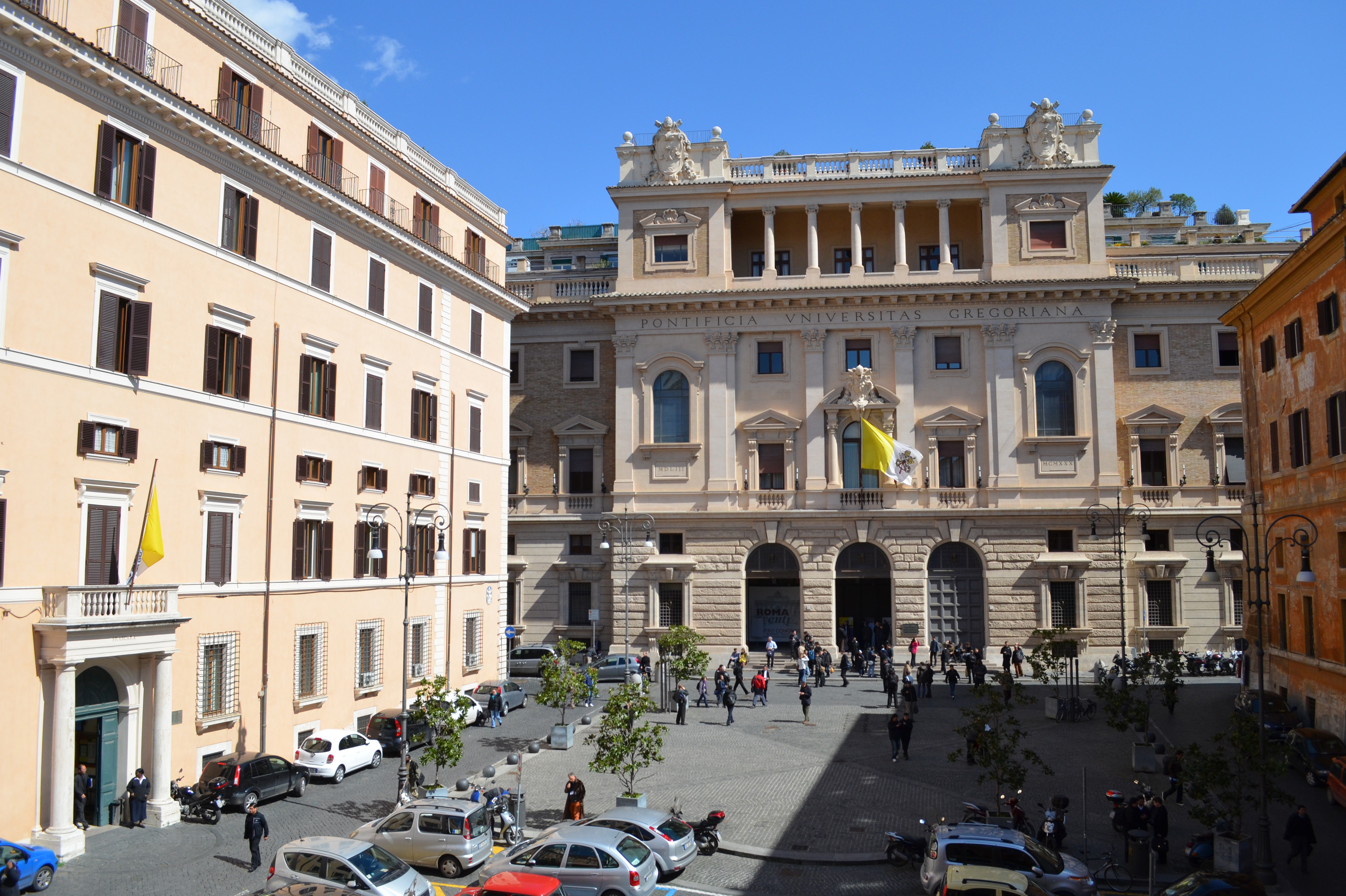
Current site of the Gregorian University

When the college reached an enrollment of 1000 students, Pope Gregory XIII decided to build it a more expansive facility. He expropriated two city blocks in Rome near the Via del Corso and commissioned the architect Bartolomeo Ammannati to design a new building. The new college building was inaugurated in 1584 in what became known as the Piazza Collegio Romano, across from the Palazzo Doria Pamphilj. In gratitude for Gregory XIII's sponsorship, the college administration lauded him as its "founder and father" and renamed the Roman College as the Gregorian University.

The new space at Piazza Collegio Romano allowed the Gregorian University to add chairs of church history and liturgy. The Gregorian soon became known for its work in mathematics, physics and astronomy. Christopher Clavius, then a professor at the Gregorian, developed the Gregorian calendar that is still used worldwide today. The Jesuit mathematician Athanasius Kircher also later taught at the Gregorian. Not long after its Piazza Collegio Romano site opened, the Gregorian had around 2,000 students. Due to the limited size of its chapel, the Gregorian started rebuilding it in 1626 as the Church of Sant'Ignazio. Completed in 1650, the church is considered one of the major Baroque churches in the Rome area.

=== Modern era ===
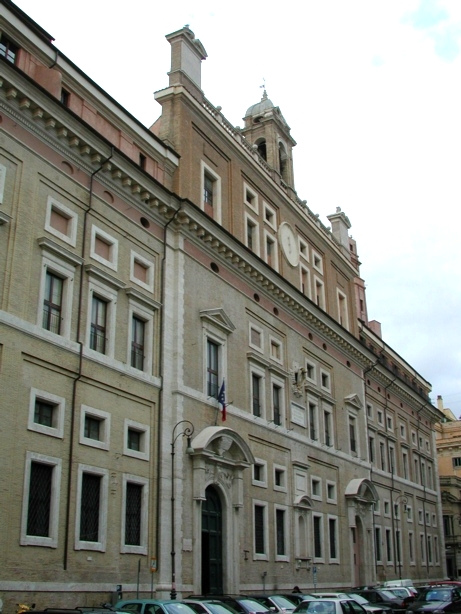
Roman College

In 1773, following the suppression of the Society of Jesus throughout Europe, the Jesuits were forced to cede control over the Gregorian University to the Diocese of Rome. But Pope Leo XII returned the Gregorian to Jesuit control on 17 May 1824 after the reestablishment of the Society of Jesus (the Diocese of Rome then founded the "Pontifical Athenaeum of the Roman Seminary", the current Pontifical Lateran University).

With the Capture of Rome in 1870, Rome and the Papal States were incorporated into the new Kingdom of Italy. The new government of Italy then confiscated the Gregorian property and building, converting it into the Ennio Quirino Visconti Liceo Ginnasio. The Gregorian was forced to move into a much smaller facility at the Palazzo Gabrielli-Borromeo on Via del Seminario in Rome. Due to its lack of space, the Gregorian was forced to drop all of its faculties except for theology and philosophy. Enrollment dropped to under 250 students by 1875.

Pope Pius IX later granted the Gregorian the title "Pontifical University". In 1876, the faculty of canon law was transferred from the University of Rome La Sapienza to the Gregorian, and the university gradually resumed the teaching of other disciplines. After World War I, Pope Benedict XV and his successor, Pope Pius XI, worked to create a new campus for the Gregorian at the base of Quirinal Hill, adjacent to the Pontifical Biblical Institute (Biblicum). Pius XI laid the first stone for the new campus on 27 December 1924. Designed by architect Giulio Barluzzi in Neoclassical style, it was completed by 1930. After moving to the new campus, the Gregorian continued to expand to new faculties and disciplines as well as to add new buildings. The Pontifical Institute Regina Mundi, dedicated to the theological formation of women, opened in 1955 and closed in 2005.

=== Current era ===
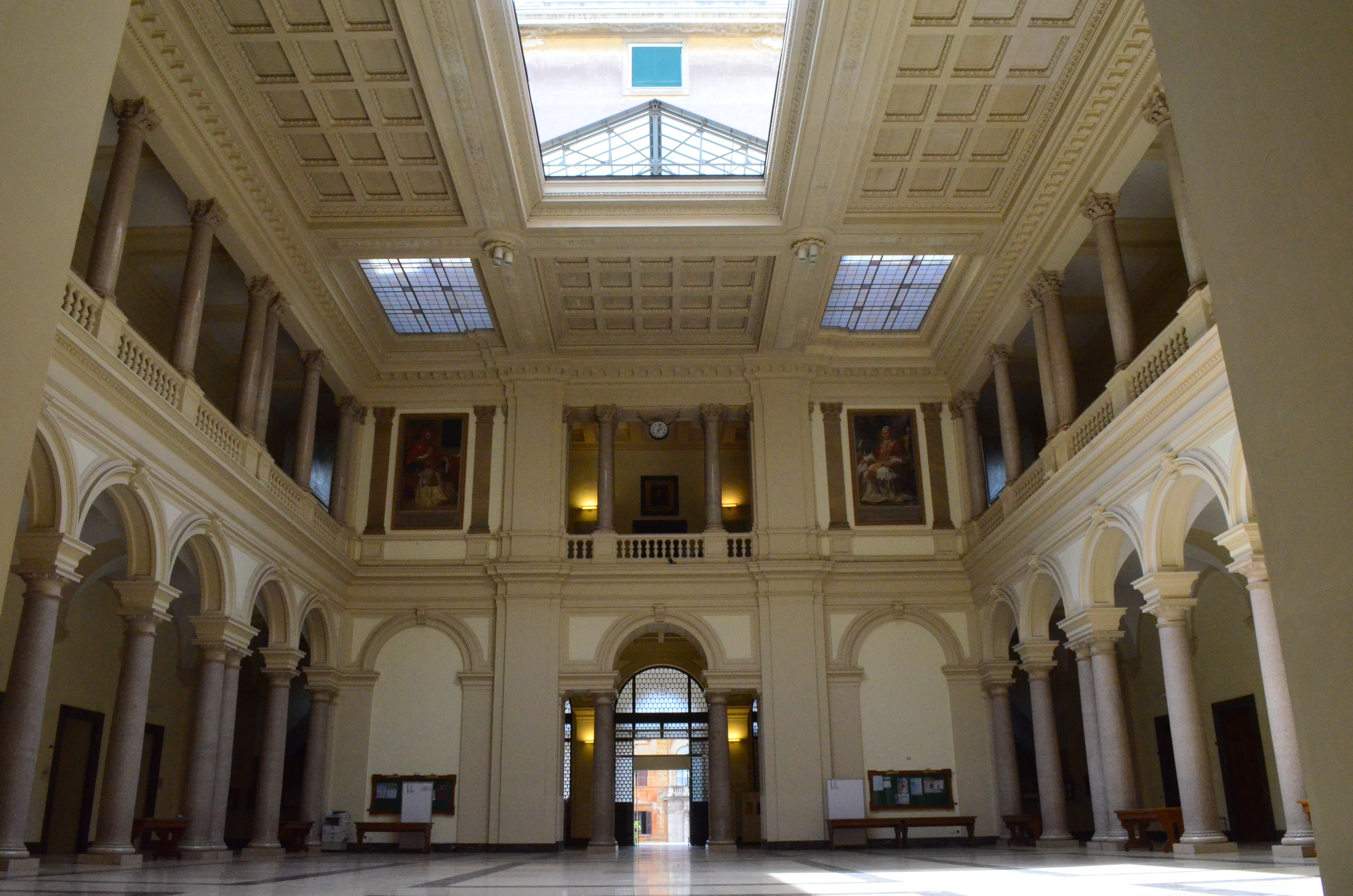
Central atrium of the Gregorian University

Today the Gregorian University has some 2750 students from over 150 countries. About 70% of the students are foreign nationals, with 65% of them coming from non-European Union countries. Most students are priests, seminarians, and members of religious orders. After the Second Vatican Council, the first women to earn doctoral degrees at the university were Sandra Schneiders, IHM and Mary Milligan, RSHM. Both graduates became authorities in New Testament theology and Christian spirituality.

The Gregorian faculties are about 60% Italian and mainly Jesuit priests. In recent years, there has been an increase in laity in both the faculties and the student body; today, diocesan and religious priests represent about 45%, seminarians 25%, lay men and women 22%, and nuns 8% of the student body. Around 1970, the Gregorian discontinued Latin as the principal language of instruction by lecturers and examiners.

Since the Gregorian is a pontifical university, the Holy See accredits its curriculum, and its degrees have full effect in canon law. Its licentiates in philosophy and theology are conferred by some Jesuit universities worldwide, entitling recipients to teach in major seminaries.

With the chirograph of 17 December 2019, Pope Francis decreed that the Pontifical Biblical Institute and the Pontifical Oriental Institute, while retaining their own names and missions, be joined to the Pontifical Gregorian University so as to be part of the same legal entity. The new statutes of the Pontifical Gregorian University with the incorporation of the two pontifical institutes were ratified and approved by the Dicastery for Culture and Education on 11 February 2024, and came into force on 19 May 2024. From 19 May 2024, therefore, the Pontifical Biblical Institute does not have its own rector, being governed by the sole rector of the Pontifical Gregorian University, but is represented by a president. By decree of the Minister of the Interior of the Italian Republic dated 28 September 2024, the canonical measure was given civil effect.

Michael Dougherty, a plagiarism expert of Ohio Dominican University, accused the university of "systematic failure to maintain academic integrity at the doctoral level at the Gregorian University in specific disciplines during a relatively recent period." His 2024 book focused on violations of academic integrity at the university from 1995 to 2014, arguing that nine dissertations were severely deficient. Among the works Dougherty analyzes were dissertations submitted by the bishops Paul Kariuki Njiru, Fintan Gavin, and Stephen Robson. Earlier accounts of plagiarism in published doctoral dissertations were documented in review articles in The Catholic Biblical Quarterly and Analecta Cisterciensia. The university commissioned a special three-member panel, whose unnamed members asserted that Bishop Robson's dissertation was legitimate.

== Academics ==
=== Gregorian Consortium ===
The Gregorian University is one of three member institutes that make up the Gregorian Consortium; the other two institutions are the Pontifical Biblical Institute (founded in 1909) and the Pontifical Oriental Institute (founded in 1917). The consortium was created under Pope Pius XI in 1928. The consortium ceased to exist on 19 May 2024, when both of the institutes were absorbed into the Pontifical Gregorian University.

=== Academic units ===
The university is governed by a single rector, assisted by the three presidents who promote the fulfilment of the missions of the Pontifical Biblical Institute, the Pontifical Oriental Institute and the Collegium Maximum. The latter body represents the academic units previously established at the Gregorian University. The Pontifical Gregorian University has today ten faculties, three institutes and five centres, all of which offer academic degrees.

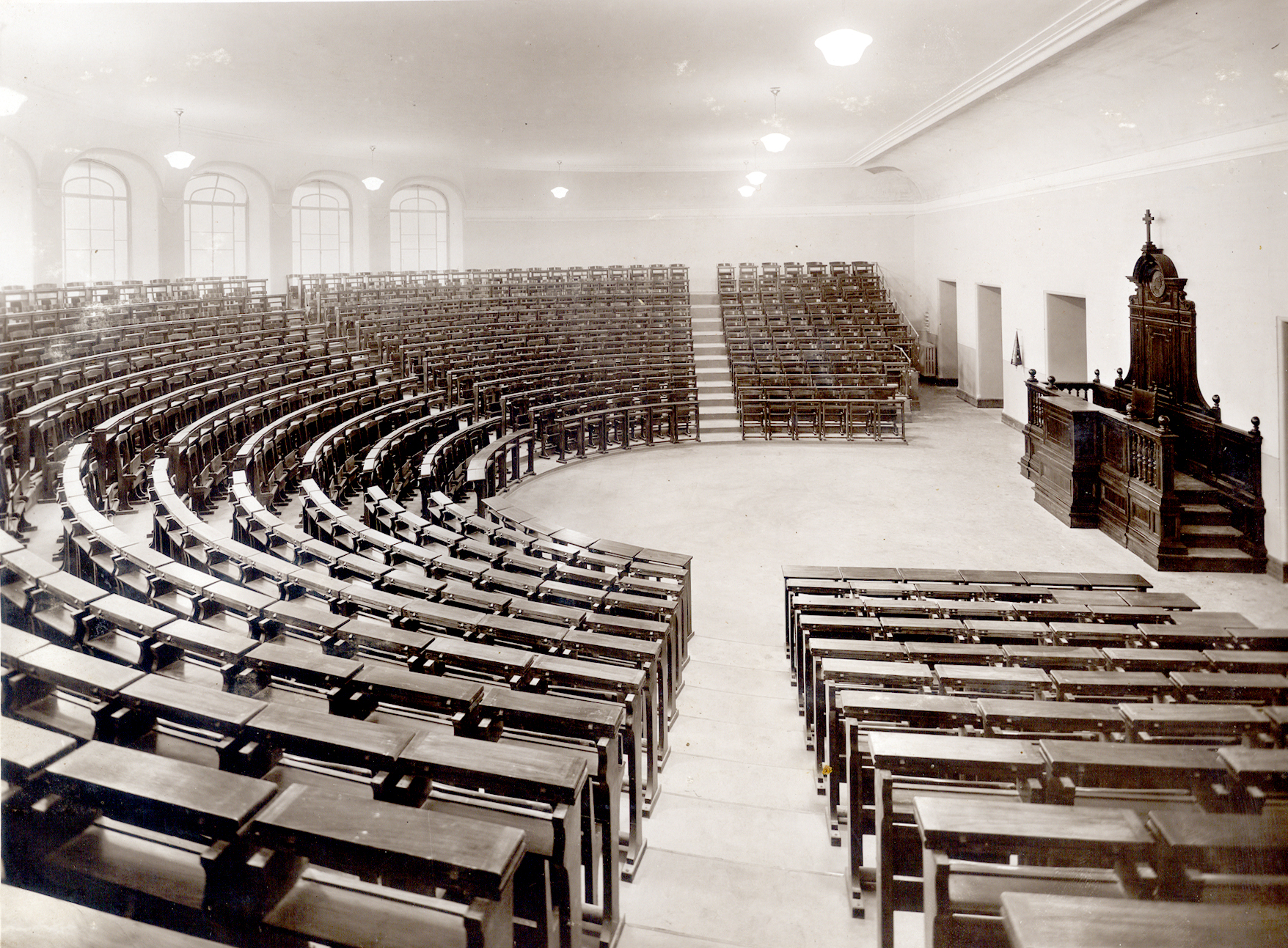
Aula magna (great hall) at Gregorian University (1930)

- Collegium Maximum:
  - Faculty of Theology (majors: Biblical Theology, Dogmatic Theology, Fundamental Theology, Moral Theology, Patristic, Comparative Christian Theology, Spiritual Theology, Vocational Theology)
  - Faculty of Philosophy (minors: Practical Philosophy, Theoretical Philosophy, Philosophy of Religion)
  - Faculty of Canon Law (minors: Matrimonial Jurisprudence, Penal Jurisprudence)
  - Faculty of History and Cultural Heritage of the Church (majors: Cultural Heritage of the Church, History of the Church)
  - Faculty of Missiology (minors: Missio Ad Gentes, New Evangelization, Theology of Religions)
  - Faculty of Social Sciences (majors: Social Communication, Social Doctrine of the Church, Sociology, Leadership and Management)
  - Institute of Psychology
  - Institute of Anthropology (former Centre for Child Protection)
  - Institute of Spirituality
  - Centre "Cardinal Bea" for Judaic Studies
  - Centre "Saint Peter Favre" for Formators to the Priesthood and Religious Life
  - Centre "Alberto Hurtado" for Faith and Culture
  - Gregorian Centre for Interreligious Studies
  - Ignatian Spirituality Centre
- Pontifical Biblical Institute:
  - Faculty of Ancient Near Eastern Studies
  - Faculty of Sacred Scriptures
- Pontifical Oriental Institute:
  - Faculty of Eastern Canon Law
  - Faculty of Eastern Ecclesiastical Sciences (majors: History, Liturgy, Patristics)

=== Libraries ===
The three libraries of the Gregorian Consortium contain nearly 1.2 million volumes, with large collections in the fields of theology, philosophy, culture and literature. The original Roman College library was founded in 1556. In 1872, the Gregorian library's 45,000 volumes, manuscripts, and archives were confiscated by the new Italian state; they were dispersed, with some of the collection going to the new Rome National Central Library.

Since 1928 the Gregorian library has been located on the Gregorian campus at Quirinal Hill. The majority of the library's collection, 820,000 volumes, is housed in a six-floor tower adjacent to the Palazzo Centrale. An additional 60,000 volumes are housed in the six reading rooms, which together seat 400 students. The library's reserve contains many ancient and precious books as well as rare editions, including 80 books from the 16th century.

== Gregorian and Biblical Press (1913–2023) ==
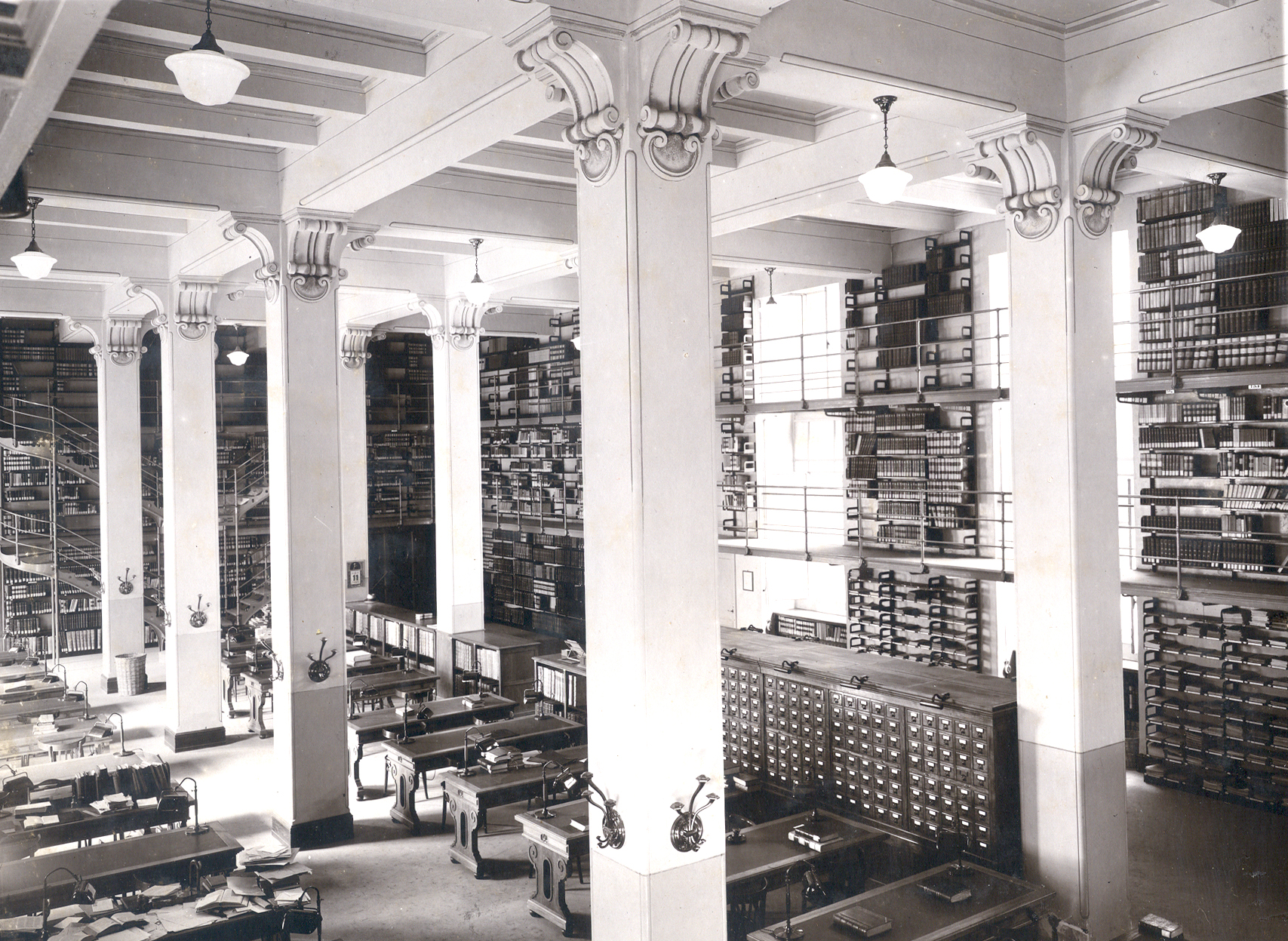
Gregorian library, 1930

The GBPress (Gregorian and Biblical Press) was founded, financed, and run by the Pontifical Gregorian University and the Pontifical Biblical Institute in Rome. Founded in 1913 and closed in 2023, it printed documents and published periodicals and monographs in most major theological subject areas. Many of the dissertations accepted by the university were published there.

== Extraterritoriality ==
According to Article 16 of the Lateran Treaty, a 1929 agreement between the Government of Italy and the Holy See, the Gregorian University enjoys a certain level of extraterritoriality. According to the treaty, Italy can never subject the university to "charges or to expropriation for reasons of public utility, save by previous agreement with the Holy See." The Gregorian is also exempt from all Italian tax and is included among those Roman buildings for which the Holy See has the right to deal "as it may deem fit, without obtaining the authorization or consent of the Italian governmental, provincial, or communal authority."

== Notable alumni and faculty ==
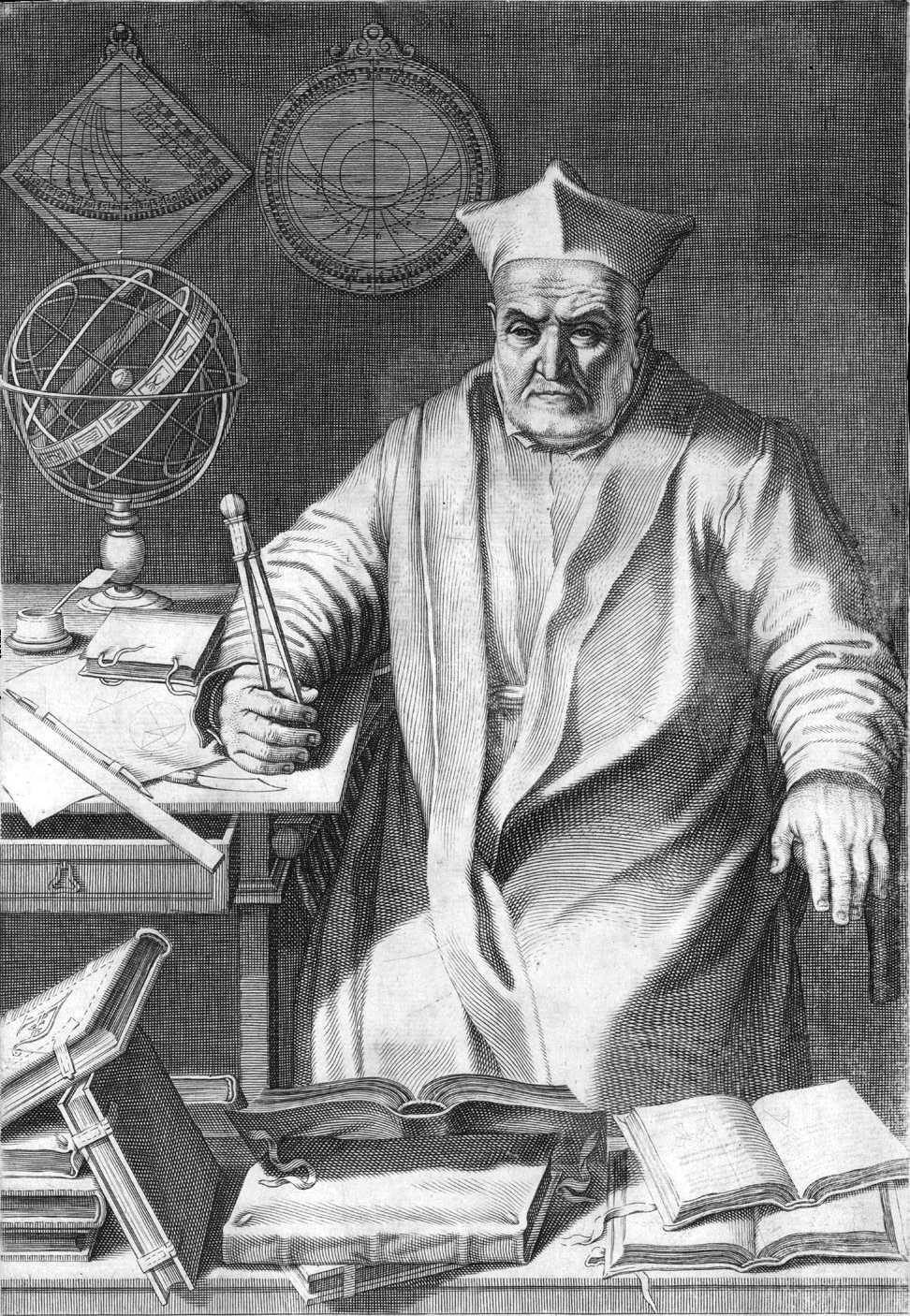
German Jesuit Christopher Clavius, inventor of the Gregorian calendar, alumnus and professor at the Roman College

Gregorian's alumni include 17 popes, such as

- Pope Gregory XV
- Pope Urban VIII
- Pope Innocent X
- Pope Innocent XII
- Pope Innocent XIII
- Pope Clement X
- Pope Clement XI
- Pope Clement XII
- Pope Benedict XV
- Pope Pius XI
- Pope Pius IX
- Pope Leo XIII
- Pope Pius XII
- Pope Paul VI
- Pope John Paul I

Eight of the last eleven popes were alumni of the Gregorian. Other students include 72 saints and beatified persons including Saint Robert Bellarmine, Saint Aloysius Gonzaga and Saint Maximilian Kolbe. Former Gregorian professors include Joseph Ratzinger, later Pope Benedict XVI, a visiting professor in the faculty of theology from 1972 to 1973.

Gregorian alumni and professors include:

- Bartholomew I, Greek Ecumenical Patriarch of Constantinople and New Rome
- Mar Joseph Kallarangatt, Indian theologian and bishop
- Simona Brambilla, Italian nun
- Roger Boscovich, Ragusan Jesuit priest, physicist and mathematician
- David Cairns, Scottish politician
- Christopher Clavius, German Jesuit priest and inventor of the Gregorian calendar
- Friedrich Dörr, German priest, professor and hymnwriter
- Nataša Govekar, Slovenian theologician
- Jules Mazarin, French cardinal and prime minister to the French monarchy
- Joseph Perumthottam, Indian Metropolitan of the Syro-Malabar Catholic Archeparchy of Changanacherry
- Reginald Foster, American priest, Latinist and professor
- Filippo Grandi, Italian Commissioner-General of UNRWA
- Peter Henrici, Swiss Jesuit priest, philosopher and Auxiliary Bishop of Chur
- Wilhelm Imkamp, German priest, theologian and professor
- Francesco Lana de Terzi, Italian Jesuit priest and aeronautics scientist
- Bernard Lonergan, Canadian Jesuit priest, philosopher, theologian and economist
- Heinrich Maier, Austrian priest and resistance fighter against Nazi Germany
- Mary McAleese, former President of Ireland
- John Navone, American Jesuit priest, professor and theologian
- Denis Fahey, Irish priest and theological writer
- Athanasius Kircher, German Jesuit priest, scholar and polymath
- Hans Küng, Swiss priest and theologian
- Charles Curran, American priest and moral theologian
- Vincenzo Riccati, Venetian Jesuit priest and inventor of hyperbolic functions
- Luca Valerio, Italian Jesuit priest and mathematician
- Paul Guldin, Swiss Jesuit priest, mathematician and astronomer
- Óscar Romero, Salvadoran archbishop and activist
- Gian Vittorio Rossi, Italian poet, philologist and historian
- Andrea Salvadori, Italian poet and librettist
- Henricus Smeulders, Belgian Procurator General of the Cistercian Order
- John Wijngaards, Dutch theologian and former priest
- James V. Schall, American Jesuit priest, writer, philosopher and professor
- Francis A. Sullivan, American Jesuit priest, theologian and professor
- Anderson Sunda-Meya, Congolese-American physicist and educator
- David Tracy, American priest, theologian and professor
- Niccolò Zucchi, Italian Jesuit priest, astronomer and physicist
- Patrick Augustine Kalilombe, Malawian theologian and Bishop of Lilongwe
- Samuel Ruiz, Mexican theologian and bishop of San Cristóbal de Las Casas
- Ademar Agostinho Sauthier, Brazilian theologian
- Sandra M. Schneiders, American theologian, writer and professor
- Mary Milligan, theologian and professor. First woman to graduate from the Gregorian
- Paolo Benanti, Franciscan priest, theologian and professor
- Aquilino Cayuela, Spanish theologian and professor
- Giovanni Cesare Pagazzi, titular archbishop of Belcastro
- Anthony Kenny, philosopher

The majority of the church's leaders graduated from the Gregorian; one-third of the current College of Cardinals studied there at one time or another, and more than 900 bishops worldwide are among its 12,000 living alumni.

== See also ==
- List of early modern universities in Europe
- List of Jesuit sites
