= Time in Namibia =

Time in Africa: Light Blue Cape Verde Time^{[a]} (UTC−1) Blue Greenwich Mean Time (UTC) Red: Central European Time; West Africa Time; (UTC+1)^{[b]} Yellow: Central Africa Time; Eastern European Time; South African Standard Time; (UTC+2) Ochre: Egypt Standard Time; (UTC+2): Egypt Summer Time; (UTC+3) Green East Africa Time (UTC+3) Turquoise: Mauritius Time^{[d]}; Seychelles Time^{[d]}; (UTC+4)^{a} The islands of Cape Verde and the Canary Islands lie west of the African mainland.^{b} During Ramadan, Morocco switches to Greenwich Mean Time (UTC) and returns to UTC+1 after it ends.^{d} Mauritius and the Seychelles lie to the east and northeast of Madagascar, respectively.

Namibia since September 2017 is in the Central Africa Time zone at UTC+02:00, congruous with South African Standard Time.

The country kept the time regulations of South Africa when it gained independence in 1990. Triggered by fears for children walking to school before sunrise, in 1993 the Namibian Time Bill was passed, stipulating the switch to Winter time as one of only a few countries in the world. Only the Zambezi Region in the far north-east remained at UTC+02:00. In the 2010s criticism of Namibian time regulations arose, mainly due to incompatibilities with South Africa, Namibia's main trading partner, and the hassle of different time regulations in the Caprivi Strip.

After public consultations the Namibian Time Bill 2017 was tabled in the National Assembly in February 2017 and passed by National Council in August.

== History ==
=== Until 1994 ===
Upon Namibian independence the country used a single time zone, keeping time regulation as previously prescribed by the occupying nation, South Africa. Triggered by fears for school children walking to school before sunrise, discussions in the National Assembly started in 1992, and on 10 November 1993 the Namibian Time Bill (#39 of 1993) was proposed. This bill defined the Namibian Standard Time.

=== 1994–2017 ===
From 1994 until 2017 Namibia used Winter time, the practice of setting clocks back during winter months by one hour. In this period Namibian Standard Time was at UTC+02:00 (derived from South African Standard Time and equivalent to Central Africa Time) in summer, and UTC+01:00 (equivalent to West Africa Time) in winter. Winter time began on the first Sunday in April at 03:00, and lasted until the first Sunday in September, 02:00 hours. In the Zambezi Region in the far north-east of Namibia clocks were not changed and remained on Central Africa Time all year round so that during winter time, Namibia spanned two time zones.

Namibia was one of only a few countries in the world to implement winter time instead of daylight saving time. Ireland still adjusts clocks in Winter since 1971 while Czechoslovakia used the practice only in 1946 and never repeated it. In a regular daylight saving time scheme, the "normal" time is observed in the winter, and clocks are turned forward during the summer. In winter time, normal time is observed in the summer, and clocks are turned back by one hour in the winter. In timekeeping, then, it is equivalent to daylight saving time, differing only in which season is considered the regular time. However, the purpose was not to utilise additional hours of daylight in the evening, but to prevent children from walking to school in darkness in the morning, to decrease the risk of injuries and assaults.

If expressed as summer times, these would have been equivalent to West Africa Summer Time and West Africa Standard Time, however Namibia was the only state in Africa to use the combination of UTC+01:00 and UTC+02:00. Central European Time also uses UTC+01:00 and UTC+02:00, but the northern seasons are opposite to the southern hemisphere.

=== Since 2017 ===
In the 2010s repeated calls from businesses and private individuals were made to abolish winter time, citing incompatibilities with South Africa, Namibia's main trading partner, as well as a "loss of productivity".

This resulted in an official investigation by the Ministry of Home Affairs and Immigration. During the polls, 97% of the 3,507 questioned people were in favour of the +2 difference to Greenwich Mean Time, and about 88% wanted to abolish winter time. After the Cabinet was likewise against changing clocks in autumn and spring, minister Pendukeni Iivula-Ithana proposed a new bill to that effect in February 2017. The Home Affairs ministry stated that winter time would proceed in 2017, as discussions were still ongoing.

The National Council passed the Namibian Time Bill 2017 in August 2017 and repealed the 1993 act, abolishing daylight saving time in the country and setting Central Africa Time as the year-round time zone nationwide.
