= Stacey Naris =

Namibian footballer (born 1991)

Personal information
- Date of birth: 24 February 1991 (age 35)
- Position: Defender

Senior career*
Years	Team	Apps	(Gls)
- TuS Lipperode

International career^{‡}
- Namibia
- * Club domestic league appearances and goals ‡ National team caps and goals as of 11 october 2014 (before the 2014 African Women's Championship)

Stacey Naris (born 24 February 1991) is a Namibian footballer who plays as a defender for the Namibia women's national team. She was part of the team at the 2014 African Women's Championship. At the club level, she played for TuS Lipperode in Germany.

Stacey was appointed as a new board member of Fifpro's Africa Division to represent the entire Africa.
