= Lina Katuta =

Namibian footballer (born 1986)

Ndapewa Katuta
Personal information
- Full name: Iina Ndapewa Katuta
- Date of birth: 16 December 1986 (age 39)
- Position: Defender

Team information
- Current team: Khomas Nampol

Senior career*
Years	Team	Apps	(Gls)
- JS Academy
- Khomas Nampol

International career^{‡}
- Namibia
- * Club domestic league appearances and goals ‡ National team caps and goals as of 11 October 2014 (before the 2014 African Women's Championship)

Iina Ndapewa Katuta (born 16 December 1986), known as Ndapewa Katuta, is a Namibian footballer who plays as a defender for Namibia Women's Super League club Khomas Nampol FC and the Namibia women's national team. She was part of the team at the 2014 African Women's Championship. On club level she played for JS Academy in Namibia.
