= Annie Kibanji =

Zambian footballer (born 1991)

Personal information
- Date of birth: 13 May 1991 (age 35)
- Position: Defender

Senior career*
Years	Team	Apps	(Gls)
- Green Buffaloes F.C.

International career^{‡}
- Zambia
- * Club domestic league appearances and goals ‡ National team caps and goals as of 11 october 2014 (before the 2014 African Women's Championship)

Annie Kibanji (born 13 May 1991) is a Zambian footballer who plays as a defender for the Zambia women's national football team. She was part of the team at the 2014 African Women's Championship. On club level she played for Green Buffaloes F.C. in Zambia.
