= Racheal Lungu =

Zambian footballer (born 1995)

Personal information
- Date of birth: 15 April 1995 (age 31)
- Position: Midfielder

Senior career*
Years	Team	Apps	(Gls)
- Bauleni Sports Academy

International career^{‡}
- Zambia
- * Club domestic league appearances and goals ‡ National team caps and goals as of 11 october 2014 (before the 2014 African Women's Championship)

Racheal Lungu (born 15 April 1995) is a Zambian footballer who plays as a midfielder for the Zambia women's national football team. She was part of the team at the 2014 African Women's Championship. On club level she played for Bauleni Sports Academy in Zambia.
