= Fayrouz Benyoub =

Algerian footballer (born 1995)

Personal information
- Date of birth: 12 August 1995 (age 31)
- Place of birth: Toulouse, France
- Height: 1.65 m (5 ft 5 in)
- Position: Midfielder

Youth career
- 2010–2013: Toulouse

Senior career*
Years	Team	Apps	(Gls)
2013–2014	Toulouse	10	(1)
2014–2018	Muret	15	(0)

International career^{‡}
2014	Algeria	2	(0)
- * Club domestic league appearances and goals as of 24 May 2015. ‡ National team caps and goals as of 18 October 2014.

Fayrouz Benyoub (Arabic: فيروز بنيوب; born 12 August 1995) is an Algerian former footballer who played as a midfielder. Born in France, she was a member of the Algeria national team.

== Club career ==
Benyoub has played for Toulouse FC and AS Muret in France.

== International career ==
Benyoub capped for Algeria at senior level during the 2014 African Women's Championship.
