= Susanna Eises =

Namibian footballer (born 1991)

Personal information
- Full name: Susanna Zelda Eises
- Date of birth: 18 January 1991 (age 35)
- Place of birth: Windhoek, Namibia
- Height: 1.61 m (5 ft 3 in)
- Positions: Goalkeeper; defender

Senior career*
Years	Team	Apps	(Gls)
- Okahandja Beauties FC
- Khomas Nampol Ladies FC

International career^{‡}
- Namibia
- * Club domestic league appearances and goals ‡ National team caps and goals as of 11 october 2014 (before the 2014 African Women's Championship)

Susanna Zelda Eises (born 18 January 1991) is a Namibian footballer who plays as a goalkeeper.

Nicknamed Damara, Eises started to play for the Okahandja Beauties FC. She was selected in 2006 for the Namibia women's national football team as a defender until she became a goalkeeper in mid-2011, a position she kept up to July 2012 until she was suspended.

Eises was part of the team at the 2014 African Women's Championship. On club level she plays for Khomas Nampol Ladies FC in Namibia.
