= Sabrina Labiod =

Algerian footballer (born 1986)

Personal information
- Date of birth: 17 June 1986 (age 40)
- Place of birth: Toulouse, France
- Position: Midfielder

Senior career*
Years	Team	Apps	(Gls)
2000–2001	Toulouse OA B		
2001–2003	Toulouse		
2003–2005	Toulouse B		
2006–2007	Toulouse	3	(0)
2013–2014	Toulouse	23	(5)
2014–2015	Muret	11	(0)

International career^{‡}
2014	Algeria	1	(0)
- * Club domestic league appearances and goals ‡ National team caps and goals as of 18 October 2014.

Sabrina Labiod (Arabic: سابرينا لابيود; born 17 June 1986) is a former footballer who played as a midfielder. Born in France, she was a member of the Algeria national team.

== Club career ==
Labiod has played for Toulouse FC and AS Muret in France.

== International career ==
Labiod capped for Algeria at senior level during the 2014 African Women's Championship.
