= Emelda Musonda =

Zambian footballer (born 1994)

Personal information
- Date of birth: 29 November 1994 (age 31)
- Position: Defender

Senior career*
Years	Team	Apps	(Gls)
- Red Arrows F.C.

International career^{‡}
- Zambia
- * Club domestic league appearances and goals ‡ National team caps and goals as of 11 october 2014 (before the 2014 African Women's Championship)

Emelda Musonda (born 29 November 1994) is a Zambian footballer who plays as a defender for the Zambia women's national football team. She was part of the team at the 2014 African Women's Championship. On club level she played for Red Arrows F.C. in Zambia.
