= Justina Banda =

Zambian footballer (born 1992)

Personal information
- Date of birth: 1 February 1992 (age 34)
- Position: Midfielder

Senior career*
Years	Team	Apps	(Gls)
- Olympic Centre

International career^{‡}
- Zambia
- * Club domestic league appearances and goals ‡ National team caps and goals as of 11 october 2014 (before the 2014 African Women's Championship)

Justina Banda (born 1 February 1992) is a Zambian footballer who plays as a midfielder for the Zambia women's national football team. She was part of the team at the 2014 African Women's Championship. On club level she played for Olympic Centre in Zambia.
