= Shiwe Nogwanya =

South African soccer player

Shiwe Nongwanya
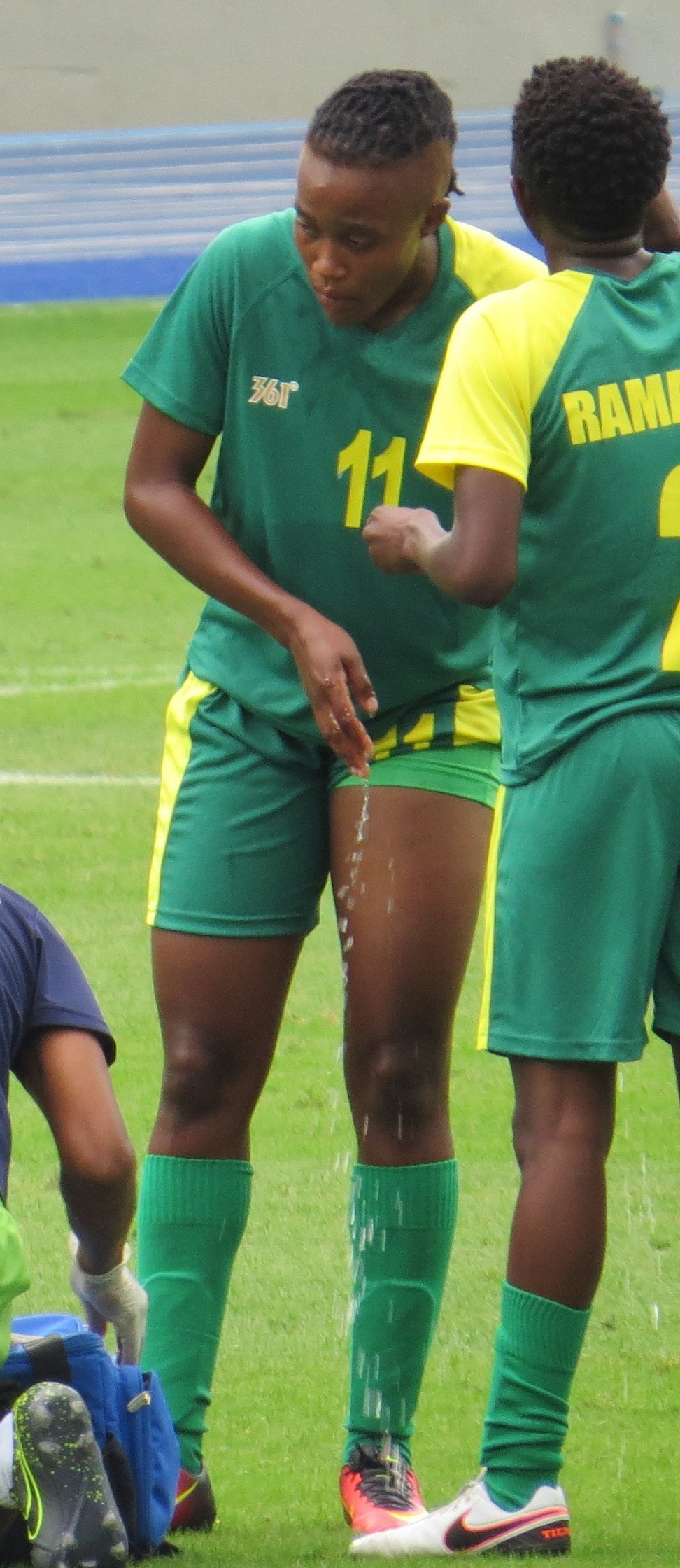
- Nogwanya at the 2016 Olympics

Personal information
- Full name: Shiwe Octavia Nogwanya
- Date of birth: 7 March 1994 (age 32)
- Place of birth: Kroonstad, South Africa
- Height: 1.68 m (5 ft 6 in)
- Position: Striker

Senior career*
| Years | Team | Apps | (Gls) |
- Bloemfontein Celtic Ladies

International career^{‡}
| 2013– | South Africa | 11 | (3) |
- * Club domestic league appearances and goals ‡ National team caps and goals as of 11 October 2014

Shiwe Octovia Nogwanya (also Nongwanya; born 7 March 1994) is a South African football striker. She plays for Bloemfontein Celtic and the South Africa women's national football team.

== Playing career ==
Nongwanya was called up to the senior national team in February 2013 in preparation for the 2013 Cyprus Cup. She made her first appearance for the team during the tournament. In September 2014, Nongwanya was named to the roster for the 2014 African Women's Championship in Namibia.
