= Memory Ngonda =

Namibian footballer (born 1998)

Personal information
- Date of birth: 11 February 1998 (age 28)
- Place of birth: Choto, Namibia
- Position: Midfielder

Team information
- Current team: Tura Magic

Senior career*
Years	Team	Apps	(Gls)
- SOS Children's Village FC
- Tura Magic

International career^{‡}
- Namibia
- * Club domestic league appearances and goals ‡ National team caps and goals as of 11 October 2014 (before the 2014 African Women's Championship)

Memory Ngonda (born 11 February 1998) is a Namibian footballer who plays as a midfielder for Namibia Women's Super League club Tura Magic FC and the Namibia women's national team. She was part of the team at the 2014 African Women's Championship. On club level she played for SOS Children's Village FC in Namibia.
