= Flore Enyegue =

Cameroonian footballer

Personal information
- Date of birth: 9 July 1991 (age 35)
- Height: 1.81 m (5 ft 11 in)
- Position: Goalkeeper

Team information
- Current team: Canon Yaoundé

Senior career*
Years	Team	Apps	(Gls)
- AS Police

International career^{‡}
	Cameroon	9	(0)
- * Club domestic league appearances and goals ‡ National team caps and goals as of 6 June 2015 (before the 2015 FIFA Women's World Cup)

Flore Enyegue (born 9 July 1991) is a Cameroonian footballer who plays as a goalkeeper for Canon Yaoundé. She is a member of the Cameroon women's national football team. She was part of the team at the 2015 FIFA Women's World Cup. On club level she plays for AS Police in Cameroon.
