= Kahina Takenint =

Algerian footballer (born 1991)

Personal information
- Date of birth: 21 May 1991 (age 35)
- Position: Goalkeeper

Team information
- Current team: AS Sûreté Nationale
- Number: 1

International career^{‡}
| Years | Team | Apps | (Gls) |
| 2014– | Algeria | 3 | (0) |
- ‡ National team caps and goals as of 20 June 2019

Kahina Takenint (Arabic: كهينة تاكنبنت, born 21 May 1991) is an Algerian international footballer who plays as a goalkeeper for the Algeria women's national football team. She competed for Algeria at the 2018 Africa Women Cup of Nations, playing in three matches.
