= Antonio Cayuela =

Spanish footballer

Personal information
- Full name: Antonio Cayuela Millán
- Date of birth: 21 September 1917
- Place of birth: La Unión, Spain
- Date of death: 6 February 2006 (aged 88)
- Place of death: Oviedo, Spain
- Position: Forward

Senior career*
Years	Team	Apps	(Gls)
1938–1939	CF Sant Just		
1939–1941	Espanyol		
1941–1942	Mataró		
1942	Martinenc		
- * Club domestic league appearances and goals

Antonio Cayuela Millán (21 September 1917 – 6 February 2006) was a Spanish footballer who played as a forward for Espanyol.

== Playing career ==
Born on 21 September 1917 in La Unión, Murcia, Cayuela played for the Catalonia-based CF Sant Just during the 1938–39 season. In the build-up for a La Liga away fixture against Sevilla FC on 10 March 1940, at least five of Espanyol's undisputed starters were ruled out due to injury, so the club signed both Cayuela and AE Prat's Jaime Arasa as an emergency solution to face Sevilla with minimum guarantees; this turned out to be the only official match that he played for the first team, which ended in a 0–4 loss that knocked out Espanyol from the top of the league table.

While returning to Barcelona, the bus carrying the players suffered an accident near Talavera de la Reina, which resulted in many injuries, with Cayuela losing a left eye. In his only season at Espanyol, the club won the 1940 Copa del Generalísimo, beating Real Madrid 3–2 in the final, but he failed to play a single cup match of that campaign, thus not being considered one of its winners.

Cayuela went on to play for Mataró and Martinenc during the 1941–42 season, after which he retired from football.

== Death ==
Cayuela died in Oviedo on 6 February 2006, at the age of 88.
