= Anna Shikusho =

Namibian footballer (born 1995)

Personal information
- Full name: Anna Marie Ngonde Shikusho
- Date of birth: 5 April 1995 (age 31)
- Position: Forward

Team information
- Current team: FC Ongos

Senior career*
Years	Team	Apps	(Gls)
2015-2023	Tura Magic		(84)
2024-	FC Ongos	18	(32)

International career
- Namibia
- * Club domestic league appearances and goals

Anna Marie Ngonde Shikusho (born 5 April 1995) is a Namibian footballer who plays as a forward for Namibia Women's Super League club Ongos FC and the Namibia women's national team.

== International career ==
Shikusho capped for Namibia at senior level during the 2018 Africa Women Cup of Nations qualification.
