= Emma Naris =

Namibian footballer (born 1996)

Personal information
- Full name: Eddelsisingh Emma Naris
- Date of birth: 8 November 1996 (age 29)
- Position: Defender

Team information
- Current team: Tura Magic

Senior career*
Years	Team	Apps	(Gls)
- Tura Magic

International career
- Namibia
- * Club domestic league appearances and goals

Eddelsisingh Emma Naris (born 8 November 1996), known as Emma Naris, is a Namibian footballer who plays as a defender for Namibia Women's Super League club Tura Magic FC and captains the Namibia women's national team.

== International career ==
Naris capped for Namibia at senior level during the 2018 Africa Women Cup of Nations qualification.
