= Anderson Sunda-Meya =

Congolese–American physicist

Anderson Sunda Meya
- Born: Democratic Republic of the Congo
- Education: North Carolina State University (BS, PhD)
- Scientific career
- Workplaces: Xavier University of Louisiana
- Thesis: Shape and stability of epitaxial nanostructures evolving under growth or annealing (2007)

Anderson Sunda-Meya is a Congolese–American physicist and the Norwood Endowed Professor of Physics at Xavier University in New Orleans. He also holds the position of Associate Dean. Sunda-Meya was awarded the 2021 American Physical Society Excellence in Physics Education Award.

== Early life and education ==
Sunda-Meya was born in the Democratic Republic of the Congo. He studied at Le Collège Bonsomi, where he majored in maths and physics. He earned a laurea in theology at the Pontifical Gregorian University. Sunda-Meya eventually moved to the United States, where he decided that he wanted to pursue a career in science. He first studied physics at North Carolina State University, where he earned a bachelor's degree in 2001 and a doctorate in 2007. His doctoral research considers the shape and stability of nanostructures during their growth and post-deposition processing. After spending twelve years in North Carolina, Sunda-Meya moved to New Orleans, where he was offered a tenure-track position at Xavier University of Louisiana.

== Career ==
Alongside his research on nanomaterials and their application in electronic devices, Sunda-Meya looks to inspire and mentor physics students. He has been honoured with numerous awards for teaching, including the Norman C. Francis Faculty Excellence Awards for Service and Teaching. Beyond his roles at Xavier University of Louisiana, Sunda-Meya directs the Dual Degree Engineering Program and of the Louisiana Engineering Advancement Program. In 2020 Sunda-Meya was elected Associate Dean at Xavier University of Louisiana. He was awarded the 2021 American Physical Society Excellence in Physics Education Award. Together with his wife, Doryne Sunda-Meya, Sunda-Meya looks to support communities in Luila Village in the Congo.

== Select publications ==
- Chilvery, Ashwith; Das, Sanjib; Guggilla, Padmaja; Brantley, Christina; Sunda-Meya, Anderson (2016-12-01). "A perspective on the recent progress in solution-processed methods for highly efficient perovskite solar cells". Science and Technology of Advanced Materials. 17 (1): 650–658. Bibcode:2016STAdM..17..650C. doi:10.1080/14686996.2016.1226120. ISSN 1468-6996. PMC 5101873. PMID 27877911.
- Krishnatreya, Bhaskar Jyoti; Colen-Landy, Arielle; Hasebe, Paige; Bell, Breanna A.; Jones, Jasmine R.; Sunda-Meya, Anderson; Grier, David G. (2013-12-23). "Measuring Boltzmann's constant through holographic video microscopy of a single colloidal sphere". American Journal of Physics. 82 (1): 23–31. doi:10.1119/1.4827275. ISSN 0002-9505.
- Fandio Jubgang, Défi Jr.; Dikandé, Alain M.; Sunda-Meya, A. (2015-11-20). "Elliptic solitons in optical fiber media". Physical Review A. 92 (5) 053850. arXiv:2109.07714. Bibcode:2015PhRvA..92e3850F. doi:10.1103/PhysRevA.92.053850. S2CID 125924429.
