= Shirley Cloete =

Namibian footballer (born 1986)

Personal information
- Date of birth: 2 August 1986 (age 40)
- Height: 1.57 m (5 ft 2 in)
- Position: Midfielder

Senior career*
Years	Team	Apps	(Gls)
- Okahandja Beauties FC

International career^{‡}
- Namibia
- * Club domestic league appearances and goals ‡ National team caps and goals as of 11 october 2014 (before the 2014 African Women's Championship)

Shirley Cloete (born 2 August 1986) is a Namibian footballer who plays as a midfielder for the Namibia women's national team. She was part of the team at the 2014 African Women's Championship. On club level she played for Okahandja Beauties FC in Namibia.
