= Aquilino Cayuela =

Writer and university professor

- Born: 19 January 1967 (age 59); Totana, Region of Murcia

Aquilino Cayuela Cayuela (born 19 January 1967) is a Spanish writer, columnist, and professor. He specializes in moral philosophy, politics, bioethics, and theology. He was awarded the Vicente Blasco Ibáñez Narrative Prize in 2008 for his work El hombre de arena. In 2021 he began working as a columnist on matters of international relations in the digital newspaper El Debate.

== Early life ==
Cayuela was born in Totana, a municipality in the Region of Murcia, in Spain, in 1967.

He graduated in Ecclesiastical Studies at the San Vicente Ferrer Theology Faculty in 1993. He moved to Rome, where he graduated in Sacred Theology from Pontifical Lateran University, specializing in moral theology, marriage and family.

== Career ==
He worked as a tutor professor of philosophy at the San Agustín Higher Institute of Religious Sciences, of the Universidad Pontificia de Comillas, based in Valencia (1999–2003 ). In 2001, parallel to this work, he began as adjunct professor for ethics and anthropology at the Pontifical John Paul II Institute, Spanish section, of the Pontifical Lateran University in Valencia.

In 2003, he earned his PhD in Philosophy and Educational Sciences, specializing in moral and political philosophy, at the University of Valencia. From that year until 2012 he was a tenured professor of moral and political philosophy at Universidad CEU Cardenal Herrera.

In 2012, he moved to Berlin to work as a professor of philosophy and theology at the affiliated institute of the Pontifical Gregorian University. He was appointed professor of moral and political philosophy on 9 August 2018, and academic prefect of the Studium Philo sophicum-Theologicum of the Seminary of Berlin. In 2020 the CEU Institute of Humanities Ángel Ayala, of the San Pablo CEU University Foundation, in Madrid, named him visiting professor.

In 2022, he became a Full Professor of Moral and Political Philosophy at Abat Oliba CEU University.
