= Nchawaka Saili =

Zambian footballer (born 1996)

Personal information
- Date of birth: 2 July 1996 (age 30)
- Position: Forward

Senior career*
Years	Team	Apps	(Gls)
- Bauleni Sports Academy

International career^{‡}
- Zambia
- * Club domestic league appearances and goals ‡ National team caps and goals as of 11 October 2014 (before the 2014 African Women's Championship)

Nchawaka Saili (born 2 July 1996) is a Zambian footballer who plays as a forward for the Zambia women's national football team. She was part of the team at the 2014 African Women's Championship. On club level she played for Bauleni Sports Academy in Zambia.
