= Thècle Mbororo =

Cameroon association football player

Personal information
- Date of birth: 24 September 1989 (age 37)
- Height: 1.70 m (5 ft 7 in)
- Position: Goalkeeper

Senior career*
Years	Team	Apps	(Gls)
2015–????	Panthère de Garoua		

International career^{‡}
??	Cameroon	5	(0)
- * Club domestic league appearances and goals ‡ National team caps and goals as of 27 June 2015 (UTC)

Thècle Mbororo (born 24 September 1989) is a Cameroon footballer who plays as a goalkeeper. As of June 2015, she has made five appearances for the Cameroon women's national football team, and was also part of the Cameroon squad at the 2015 FIFA Women's World Cup but did not make an appearance.
