= Wanki Awachwi =

Cameroonian footballer (born 1994)

Rita Wanki Awachwi
Personal information
- Date of birth: 6 January 1994 (age 32)
- Height: 1.55 m (5 ft 1 in)
- Position: Defender

Senior career*
Years	Team	Apps	(Gls)
- Locomotive Yaoundé

International career^{‡}
	Cameroon	5	(0)
- * Club domestic league appearances and goals ‡ National team caps and goals as of 6 June 2015 (before the 2015 FIFA Women's World Cup)

Rita Wanki Awachwi (born 6 January 1994) is a Cameroonian women's international footballer who plays as a defender. She is a member of the Cameroon women's national football team. She was part of the team at the 2015 FIFA Women's World Cup. On club level she plays for Locomotive Yaoundé in Cameroon.
