= Luis Meya =

Spanish water polo player (born 1951)

Lluís Meya Adrubau
Personal information
- Full name: Lluís Meya Adrubau
- Nationality: Spanish
- Born: 19 January 1951 (age 74); Barcelona, Spain

Sport
- Sport: Water polo

Lluís Meya Adrubau (born 19 January 1951) is a Spanish water polo player. He competed in the men's tournament at the 1968 Summer Olympics.
