= Rita Williams (footballer) =

Namibian footballer (born 1979)

Personal information
- Full name: Rita Riana Williams
- Date of birth: 15 August 1979 (age 47)
- Height: 1.57 m (5 ft 2 in)
- Position: Midfielder

Team information
- Current team: Beauties F.C.
- Number: 9

Senior career*
Years	Team	Apps	(Gls)
- Beauties F.C.

International career^{‡}
- Namibia
- * Club domestic league appearances and goals ‡ National team caps and goals as of 11 October 2014 (before the 2014 African Women's Championship)

Rita Riana Williams (born 15 August 1979) is a Namibian footballer who plays as a forward for the Namibia women's national team.

She was part of the team at the 2014 African Women's Championship.

== Club career ==
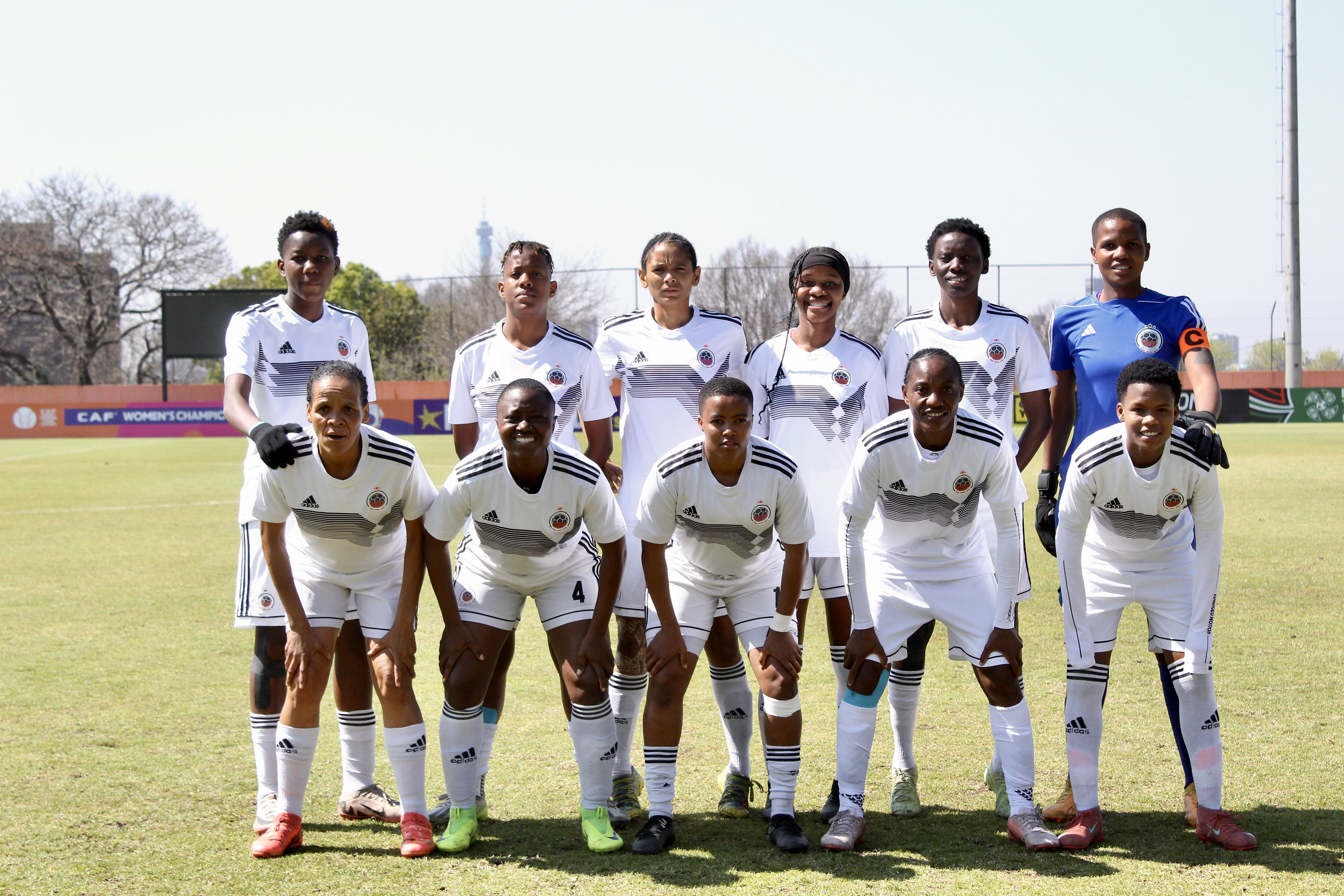
Williams (left, front row) with Beauties F.C. at the 2025 COSAFA Women's Champions League.

She played for Beauties F.C. in the Namibia Women's Super League and was the oldest player at the 2025 COSAFA Women's Champions League at 46 years old.

== International career ==
Williams was part of the players when the Namibia women's national team played their first international against South Africa in 2003.

She scored Namibia's first goal at the Women's Africa Cup of Nations in 2014.

=== International goals ===
No.	Date	Venue	Opponent	Score	Result	Competition
1.	20 August 2014	Sam Nujoma Stadium, Windhoek, Namibia	Botswana	2–0	5–2	Friendly
2.	11 October 2014	Sam Nujoma Stadium, Windhoek, Namibia	Zambia	1–0	2–0	2014 African Women's Championship
