= Winter time (clock lag) =

Aspect of daylight saving time

Facsimile of the original issue of the Czechoslovak public journal with the act 212/1946 Sb. and the government ordinance 213/1946 Sb.

Winter time is the practice of shifting the clock behind standard time during winter months, usually −1 hour. It is the opposite of daylight saving time in that the different time is in effect during winter months, rather than the usual case where the different time is in effect during summer months. However, while summer time is widely applied, use of winter time has been and is very rare.

== Czechoslovakia ==
Winter time was applied in Czechoslovakia by government ordinance no. 213/1946 Sb. from 1 December 1946 (3:00→2:00) to 23 February 1947 (2:00→3:00), authorized by act 212/1946 Sb., o zimním čase ("about the winter time"). This simple two-paragraph act, approved on 21 November 1946 and announced on 27 November 1946, authorised the government to implement winter time by ordinance at any time. The government gave as the main reason for this provision the fact that power plants had approximately 10% lack of capacity in peak hours (07:00–08:00 and 16:00–20:00) and winter time should help to spread the load out.

The act was never cancelled and it theoretically authorises the government in the successor Czech Republic, as well as in the Slovak Republic, which adopted Czechoslovak law, to implement winter time again at any time. However, the experiment has never been repeated.

== Namibia ==
Namibia used winter time since 1994 until 2017. In this period Namibian Standard Time was UTC+02:00 (derived from South African Standard Time) in summer, and UTC+01:00 (equivalent to West Africa Time) in winter. Winter time began on the first Sunday in April at 03:00, and lasted until the first Sunday in September, 02:00 hours. In the Zambezi Region in the far north-east of Namibia clocks were not changed and remained on Central Africa Time all year round so that during winter time, Namibia spanned two time zones.

The purpose was not to utilise additional hours of daylight in the evening, but to prevent children from walking to school in darkness in the morning, to decrease the risk of injuries and assaults.

== Ireland ==
Ireland uses Irish Standard Time (IST, UTC+01:00; Irish: Am Caighdeánach Éireannach) in the summer months and Greenwich Mean Time (UTC+0) in the winter period. Ireland has adjusted clocks in winter since 1971.

The Standard Time Act 1968 legally established that "the time for general purposes in the State (to be known as standard time) shall be one hour in advance of Greenwich mean time throughout the year". This act was amended by the Standard Time (Amendment) Act 1971, which legally established Greenwich Mean Time for a winter time period. Ireland therefore operates one hour behind standard time during the winter period, and reverts to standard time in the summer months. This is defined in contrast to the other states in the European Union, which operate one hour ahead of standard time during the summer period, but produces the same end result.

In Ireland, winter time begins at 02:00 IST on the last Sunday in October (changing to 01:00 GMT), and ends at 01:00 GMT on the last Sunday in March (changing to 02:00 IST).

== Chile ==
Until 2015, Continental Chile used the time offset UTC−04:00 and Easter Island used UTC−06:00 for standard time, with daylight saving time roughly between October and March every year. In January 2015 the Chilean government announced that the entire country will keep the time offset used during daylight saving time permanently. Indeed, there was no time change in 2015, however the annual time change was reinstated in 2016 after feedback from the public about an increase in truancy during the winter months, complaints about older computers and other electronic devices not using the right time zone, and fruit growers reporting a 15% loss in productivity.

Chile returned to UTC−04:00 for winter time for 3 months starting in 2016. This begins the second Saturday of May and ends on the second Saturday of August. Since 2017 a new time zone in the Magallanes and Chilean Antarctica region has been implemented, having 2 different zones in Continental Chile for the first time.

== See also ==
- Daylight saving time
