= Gloria Ofoegbu =

Nigerian footballer

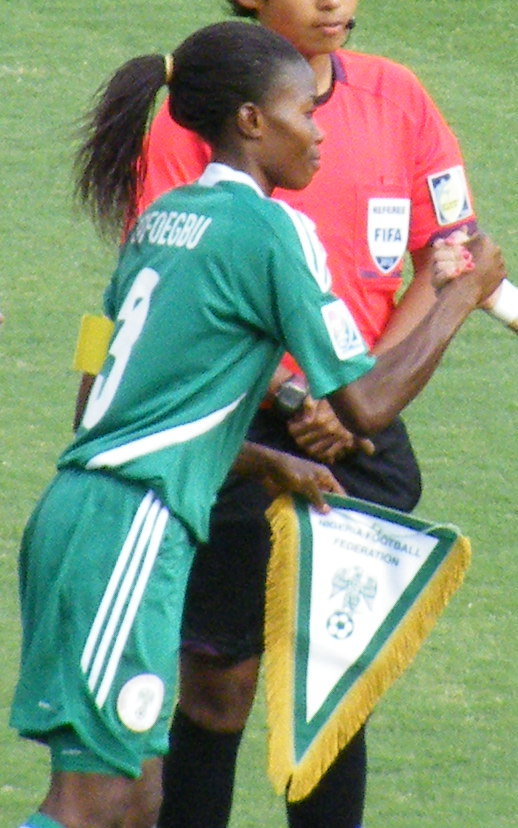

Personal information
- Full name: Gloria Chetachi Ofoegbu
- Date of birth: 3 January 1992 (age 34)
- Place of birth: Calabar, Nigeria
- Height: 1.58 m (5 ft 2 in)
- Positions: Left back; wing back

Team information
- Current team: Rivers Angels

Senior career*
Years	Team	Apps	(Gls)
2007–2010	Nasarawa Amazons		
2011–	Rivers Angels		

International career
2008	Nigeria U-17		
2010–2012	Nigeria U-20		
2014–	Nigeria		
Medal record
FIFA U-20 Women's World Cup
Silver medal – second place	2010 FIFA U-20 Women's World Cup
African Women's Championship
Gold medal – first place	2014 African Women's Championship
- * Club domestic league appearances and goals

Gloria Ofoegbu (born 3 January 1992) is a Nigerian footballer who plays as a left back and wing back for Rivers Angels and the Nigeria women's national football team. She represented Nigeria twice at FIFA U-20 tournaments in 2010 where she won silver after Nigeria finished second and in 2012. She also represented Nigeria at the 2014 African Women's Championship in Namibia.
