= Lovisa Mulunga =

Namibian footballer (born 1995)

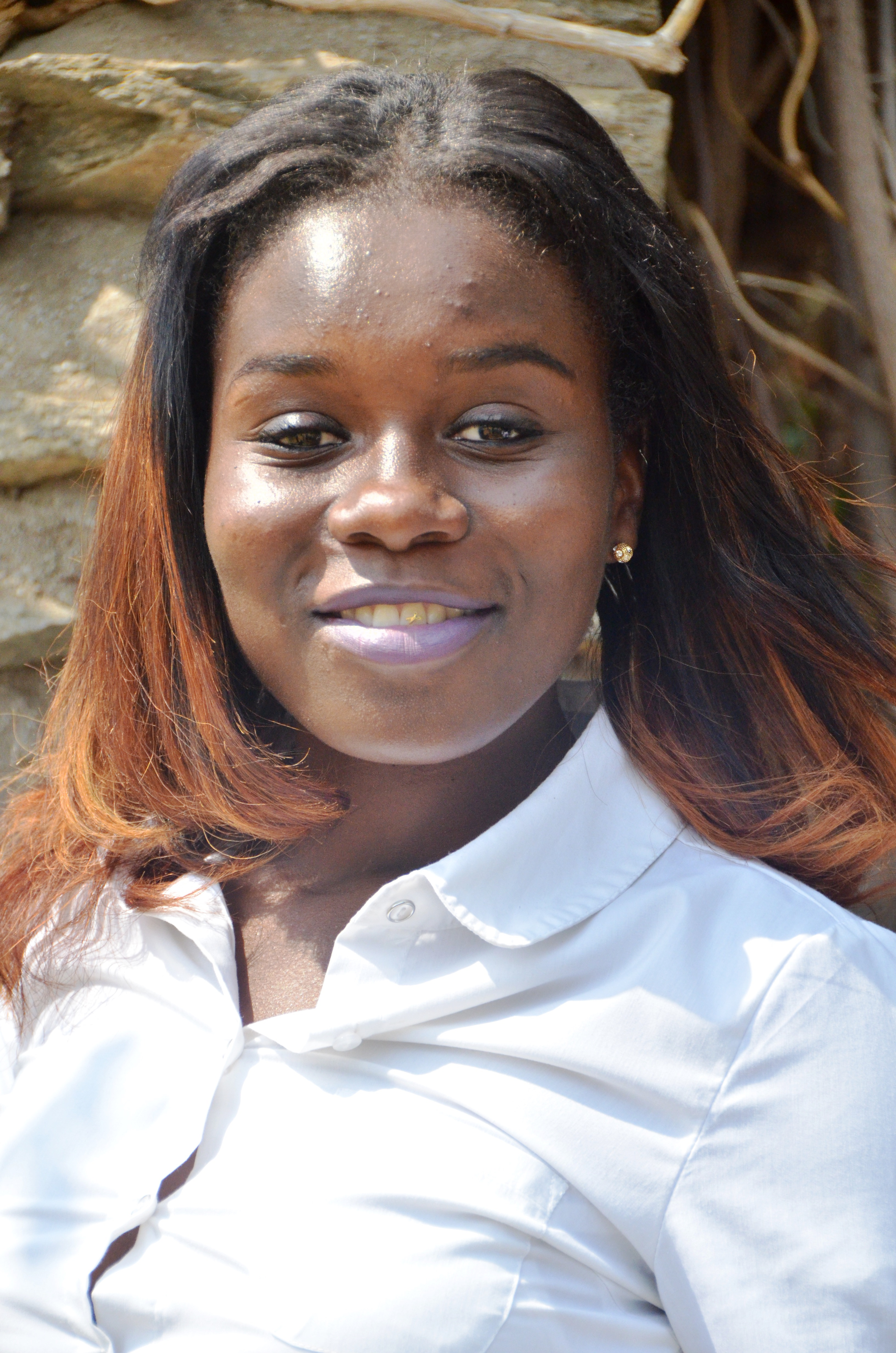
- Mulunga in September 2016

Personal information
- Full name: Lovisa Tuyakula Mulunga
- Date of birth: 18 March 1995 (age 31)
- Place of birth: Windhoek, Namibia
- Position: Defender

Team information
- Current team: Tura Magic

College career
Years	Team	Apps	(Gls)
- Albany State Golden Rams

Senior career*
Years	Team	Apps	(Gls)
- Tura Magic

International career^{‡}
2006–2009	Namibia U17		
2010–2012	Namibia U20		
- Namibia
- * Club domestic league appearances and goals as of 11 March 2013 ‡ National team caps and goals as of 11 March 2013

Lovisa Tuyakula Mulunga (born 18 March 1995) is a Namibian footballer who plays as a defender for Namibia Women's Super League club Tura Magic FC, where she is team captain, and the Namibia women's national team, also known as the Brave Gladiators. She was named the 2011/2012 Namibia Women's Super League Player of the Season.

Mulunga won the NFA Women Super League with JS Academy and was part of the under-20 Zone 6 squad that won the inaugural NFA/DFB Women Super Cup in 2012 after defeating 21 Brigade United by 8–0. Mulunga, captained the Under-17 national women team and has played for the under-20 national team.

Mulunga is considered a versatile player. She was a member of the senior national squad that played in the 2012 African Women Championship qualifiers.

Mulunga has studied at the Albany State University in the United States, playing for the Albany State Golden Rams.
