= JS Academy =

Pakistani non-profit organization

JS Academy for the Deaf is a nonprofit organization in Karachi, Pakistan, aiming at teaching deaf and hearing-impaired children to read and write. It was founded by Laila Dossa in 2004. Presently she is the chairperson.

JS Academy's main supporter is the Mahvash & Jahangir Siddiqui Foundation.

The academy serves 150 families with deaf and hearing impaired children. It has a library, physical education, art, science, sewing.
