= 2014 African Women's Championship =

Tournament details
- Host country: Namibia
- Dates: 11–25 October
- Teams: 8
- Venues: 2 (in 1 host city)

Final positions
- Champions: Nigeria (9th title)
- Runners-up: Cameroon
- Third place: Ivory Coast
- Fourth place: South Africa

Tournament statistics
- Matches played: 16
- Goals scored: 44 (2.75 per match)
- Top scorer(s): (Nigeria) Desire Oparanozie (5 goals)
- Best player: (Nigeria) Asisat Oshoala
- Best goalkeeper: (Cameroon) Annette Ngo Ndom
- Fair play award: South Africa

The 2014 African Women's Championship, the 11th edition of the tournament, was held in Namibia. This tournament, organized by the Confederation of African Football, was also a qualification tournament for the 2015 FIFA Women's World Cup, with top three qualifying for the finals in Canada. It was played on 11–25 October 2014.

The tournament marked the first participation of Namibia in the African championship. Also for the first time the defending champions, Equatorial Guinea, were not taking part after failing to win their last qualifying round match.

Nigeria defeated Cameroon 2–0 in the final to win their record-extending seventh title.

== Host ==
Namibia were awarded the hosting rights in October 2011. This was the first time they would appear in the final tournament.

There was some criticism of the slow preparation and campaigning for the event. The national women's league was suspended this year because all money was used for hosting the continental event.

== Qualification ==
A record 25 teams applied for the 2014 African Women's Championship. The top three teams from the 2012 tournament, Cameroon, Equatorial Guinea and South Africa received a bye to the second round. The preliminary round was held on 13–15 February (first leg) and 28 February–2 March 2014 (second leg), while the final qualifying round was held on 23–25 May (first leg) and 6–8 June (second leg).

Qualified teams

Team	Method of qualification	Previous appearances in tournament
Namibia	Hosts	0
Algeria	Second round winners	3 (2004, 2006, 2010)
Cameroon	Second round winners	10 (1991, 1995, 1998, 2000, 2002, 2004, 2006, 2008, 2010, 2012)
Ghana	Second round winners	9 (1991, 1995, 1998, 2000, 2002, 2004, 2006, 2008, 2010)
Ivory Coast	Second round winners	1 (2012)
Nigeria	Second round winners	10 (1991, 1995, 1998, 2000, 2002, 2004, 2006, 2008, 2010, 2012)
South Africa	Second round winners	9 (1995, 1998, 2000, 2002, 2004, 2006, 2008, 2010, 2012)
Zambia	Second round winners	2 (1991, 1995)

== Venues ==
The final tournament matches were held in two stadium venues located in Windhoek:

Windhoek	Locations of the 2014 African Women's Championship venues	Windhoek
Independence Stadium	Locations of the 2014 African Women's Championship venues	Sam Nujoma Stadium
Capacity: 25,000	Locations of the 2014 African Women's Championship venues	Capacity: 10,300

== Format ==
Eight teams were divided in two groups and play a round-robin tournament. The top two placed teams advanced to the semifinals. The losers of those semifinals played in the third place match, while the winners faced off in the final. The top three placed teams qualified for the 2015 FIFA Women's World Cup.

== Match officials ==
12 referees and 15 assistants were announced on 5 October 2014.

Referees

- (Angola) Maximina Bernado
- (Cameroon) Thérèse Raïssa
- (Ethiopia) Ledia Tafesa
- (Ghana) Christine Ziga
- (Ivory Coast) Aya Irène Ahoua
- (Kenya) Damaris Kimani
- (Mali) Kankou Coulibaly
- (Morocco) Insaf El Harkaoui
- (Senegal) Fadouma Dia
- (Tunisia) Lilia Abdeljaoued
- (Uganda) Aisha Ssemambo
- (Zambia) Gladys Lengwe

Assistant referees

- (Benin) Rosalie Tempa
- (Botswana) Botsalo Mosimanewatlala
- (Burkina Faso) Élodie Bieiginin
- (Egypt) Mona Mahmoud Atallah
- (Ethiopia) Trhas Gebreyohanis
- (Ghana) Emmanuella Aglago
- (Kenya) Mary Njoroge
- (Madagascar) Lidwine Rakotozafinoro
- (Malawi) Bernadette Kwimbira
- (Mali) Fanta Idrissa Koné
- (Morocco) Souad Oulhaj
- (Senegal) Aminata Dialo
- (Togo) Ayawa Dzodope
- (Tunisia) Chafia Hendaoui
- (Zambia) Mercy Zulu

== Group stage ==
The draw was held on 19 July 2014 at 19:00 local time at Windhoek, Namibia.

All times are local (UTC+02:00).

Tiebreakers

The teams are ranked according to points (3 points for a win, 1 point for a tie, 0 points for a loss). If tied on points, tiebreakers are applied in the following order:

1. Greater number of points obtained in the matches between the concerned teams;
2. Best Goal difference resulting from the matches between the concerned teams;
3. Goal difference in all group matches;
4. Greatest number of goals scored in all group matches;
5. Fair Play point system in which the number of yellow and red cards are evaluated;
6. Drawing of lots by CAF Organising Committee.

=== Group A ===
Pos	Team	Pld	W	D	L	GF	GA	GD	Pts	Qualification
1	Nigeria	3	3	0	0	12	2	+10	9	Knockout stage
2	Ivory Coast	3	1	1	1	6	6	0	4	Knockout stage
3	Namibia (H)	3	1	0	2	3	5	−2	3	
4	Zambia	3	0	1	2	1	9	−8	1	

Source: CAF
Rules for classification: Tiebreakers
(H) Hosts
11 October 2014
17:00

Namibia	2–0	Zambia
Williams 4'; Adams 21'	Report

Sam Nujoma Stadium, Windhoek
Referee: Therese Raissa (Cameroon)
11 October 2014
20:00

Nigeria	4–2	Ivory Coast
Sunday 11'; Diakité 54' (o.g.); Oparanozie 74', 86'	Report	F. Coulibaly 21' (pen.); Lohoues 75'

Sam Nujoma Stadium, Windhoek
Referee: Maximina Bernado (Angola)

14 October 2014
17:00

Zambia	0–6	Nigeria
	Report	Okobi 2'; Ohale 6'; Oparanozie 25' (pen.), 81'; Oshoala 64'; Nkwocha 84'

Sam Nujoma Stadium, Windhoek
Referee: Insaf El Harkaoui (Morocco)
14 October 2014
20:00

Ivory Coast	3–1	Namibia
Nahi 13'; Nrehy 84', 90'	Report	Coleman 20'

Sam Nujoma Stadium, Windhoek
Referee: Damaris Kimani (Kenya)

17 October 2014
17:00

Namibia	0–2	Nigeria
	Report	Ofoegbu 36'; Ordega 38'

Sam Nujoma Stadium, Windhoek
Referee: Lilia Abdeljaoued (Tunisia)
17 October 2014
17:00

Zambia	1–1	Ivory Coast
Banda 58'	Report	Nahi 3'

Independence Stadium, Windhoek
Referee: Bolokanang Lekgowe (Botswana)

=== Group B ===
Pos	Team	Pld	W	D	L	GF	GA	GD	Pts	Qualification
1	Cameroon	3	2	0	1	3	1	+2	6	Knockout stage
2	South Africa	3	1	1	1	6	3	+3	4	Knockout stage
3	Ghana	3	1	1	1	2	2	0	4	
4	Algeria	3	1	0	2	2	7	−5	3	

Source: CAF
Rules for classification: Tiebreakers
12 October 2014
17:00

South Africa	0–1	Cameroon
	Report	Feudjio 86'

Independence Stadium, Windhoek
Referee: Gladys Lengwe (Zambia)
12 October 2014
20:00

Algeria	1–0	Ghana
Affak 87'	Report

Independence Stadium, Windhoek
Referee: Aya Irène Ahoua (Ivory Coast)

15 October 2014
17:00

Cameroon	2–0	Algeria
Enganamouit 17', 61' (pen.)	Report

Independence Stadium, Windhoek
Referee: Kankou Coulibaly (Mali)
15 October 2014
20:00

Ghana	1–1	South Africa
Cudjoe 45'	Report	Nongwanya 19'

Independence Stadium, Windhoek
Referee: Ledia Tafesa (Ethiopia)

18 October 2014
17:00

South Africa	5–1	Algeria
Dlamini 36'; Modise 41', 87'; Mollo 70'; Makhabane 82'	Report	Affak 90'

Independence Stadium, Windhoek
Referee: Aisha Ssemambo (Uganda)
18 October 2014
17:00

Cameroon	0–1	Ghana
	Report	Cudjoe 53'

Sam Nujoma Stadium, Windhoek
Referee: Aissata Amegee (Togo)

== Knockout stage ==
In the knockout stage, if a match is level at the end of normal playing time, extra time is played (two periods of 15 minutes each) and followed, if necessary, by kicks from the penalty mark to determine the winner, except for the third place match where no extra time is played.

=== Bracket ===
Semi-finals
22 October - Windhoek
Nigeria	2
South Africa	1
22 October - Windhoek
Cameroon (a.e.t.)	2
Ivory Coast	1

Final
25 October - Windhoek
Nigeria	2
Cameroon	0
Third place play-off
25 October - Windhoek
South Africa	0
Ivory Coast	1

=== Semi-finals ===
Winners qualified for the 2015 FIFA Women's World Cup.

22 October 2014
17:00

Nigeria	2–1	South Africa
Oshoala 38', 45'	Report	Jane 67'

Sam Nujoma Stadium, Windhoek
Referee: Damaris Kimani (Kenya)

22 October 2014
20:00

Cameroon	2–1 (a.e.t.)	Ivory Coast
Enganamouit 60'; Manie 118'	Report	Nrehy 65'

Sam Nujoma Stadium, Windhoek
Referee: Ledia Tafesa (Ethiopia)

=== Third place play-off ===
Winners qualified for the 2015 FIFA Women's World Cup.

25 October 2014
17:00

South Africa	0–1	Ivory Coast
	Report	Guehai 84'

Sam Nujoma Stadium, Windhoek
Referee: Lilia Abdeljaoued (Tunisia)

=== Final ===
25 October 2014
20:00

Nigeria	2–0	Cameroon
Oparanozie 12'; Oshoala 43'	Report

Sam Nujoma Stadium, Windhoek
Referee: Gladys Lengwe (Zambia)

== Statistics ==
=== Awards ===
The following awards were given at the conclusion of the tournament.

Award	Player
Golden Ball	(Nigeria) Asisat Oshoala
Golden Boot	(Nigeria) Desire Oparanozie
Golden Gloves	(Cameroon) Annette Ngo Ndom
Fair Play Award	South Africa

=== Goalscorers ===
5 goals

- (Nigeria) Desire Oparanozie

4 goals

- (Nigeria) Asisat Oshoala

3 goals

- (Cameroon) Gaëlle Enganamouit
- (Ivory Coast) Ines Nrehy

2 goals

- (Algeria) Houria Affak
- (Ghana) Elizabeth Cudjoe
- (Ivory Coast) Josée Nahi
- (South Africa) Portia Modise

1 goal

- (Cameroon) Raissa Feudjio
- (Cameroon) Christine Manie
- (Ivory Coast) Fatou Coulibaly
- (Ivory Coast) Ida Guehai
- (Ivory Coast) Christine Lohoues
- (Namibia) Thomalina Adams
- (Namibia) Zenatha Coleman
- (Namibia) Rita Williams
- (Nigeria) Gloria Ofoegbu
- (Nigeria) Osinachi Ohale
- (Nigeria) Ngozi Okobi
- (Nigeria) Francisca Ordega
- (Nigeria) Perpetua Nkwocha
- (Nigeria) Esther Sunday
- (South Africa) Amanda Dlamini
- (South Africa) Refiloe Jane
- (South Africa) Mamello Makhabane
- (South Africa) Sanah Mollo
- (South Africa) Shiwe Nongwanya
- (Zambia) Susan Banda

Own goal

- (Ivory Coast) Mariam Diakité (playing against Nigeria)

=== Team statistics ===
Pos.	Team	Pld	W	D	L	Pts	GF	GA	GD
1	Nigeria	5	5	0	0	15	16	3	+13
2	Cameroon	5	3	0	2	9	5	4	+1
3	Ivory Coast	5	2	1	2	7	8	8	0
4	South Africa	5	1	1	3	4	7	6	+1
**Eliminated in the group stage**
5	Ghana	3	1	1	1	4	2	2	0
6	Namibia	3	1	0	2	3	3	5	−2
7	Algeria	3	1	0	2	3	2	7	−5
8	Zambia	3	0	1	2	1	1	9	−8
Total		16^{(1)}	14	2^{(2)}	14	46	44	44	0

Team(s) rendered in italics represent(s) the host nation(s). The competition's winning team is rendered in bold.
^{(1)} – Total games lost not counted in total games played (total games lost = total games won)
^{(2)} – Total number of games drawn (tied) for all teams = Total number of games drawn (tied) ÷ 2 (both teams involved)
