= List of 2023 FIFA Women's World Cup controversies =

There were various controversies relating to the 2023 FIFA Women's World Cup; such issues predominantly saw figures within women's football negatively responding to decisions undertaken by FIFA, the world governing body of football, as well as players from several nations taking collective action against their national football associations. Concerns were particularly raised where decisions would clash with LGBT+ rights, something FIFA have acknowledged women's footballers are passionate about, as well as on player welfare and pay. There were also other team-specific issues.

Women's football journalist Suzanne Wrack noted that the types of controversial issues at the Women's World Cup were different to those of the Men's World Cup, and were mainly issues related to the gender gap in professionalism of football; she opined that the 2023 Women's World Cup and the controversies surrounding it were deeply connected, that the on-pitch performances would reflect the progress, or not, made with the off-pitch issues, a situation she described as "fascinating". Sky Sports noted the breadth of the issues, that similar issues affected teams with different backgrounds from all over the world, even if there was greater focus on the "star-heavy" European teams. Some of these issues becoming public controversies ahead of the Women's World Cup was attributed to women's players being vocal about their concerns, due to typically having to advocate for themselves in the sport, with TIME explaining that "female players, it seems, never have the luxury of just sticking to sports".

== Hosting and organisation ==
=== England host bid vote ===
After the 2020 vote on which bid would be awarded hosting rights to the 2023 Women's World Cup, co-winners Football Australia criticised the Football Association (the FA; England). The UEFA Council members, including England, agreed to vote for Colombia together, so the FA had not voted for the Australia-New Zealand bid; Football Australia and media in Australia called England's vote "disrespectful" and "a betrayal". Due to colonial ties, the two nations traditionally have fierce sporting rivalries.

=== Timezones and travel ===
A review of the development of women's football suggested that the location of the tournament so far from the main women's football markets in Europe and the Americas, meaning games will be played at unfavourable times for these audiences (typically overnight or in the early morning), "does cause some problems", but there are ways to still drive engagement through investment. It was noted that a major tournament being held in Australia for the first time meant that it was immensely popular in the host country. Brazil also recorded a different problem with the match schedule: anticipating that people would come to work late in order to watch the team play, the government moved the working hours for the civil service to later in the day for Brazil's group stage games. Morning mass in the hometown of one of the Ireland players was moved earlier so that people could watch their games, while several bars in Washington, D.C. operated 24-hour service during the World Cup after the city approved extended alcohol license hours.

Canadian writer Cathal Kelly was scathing in an opinion piece on the game times, which typically fell in the early morning or late evening in Toronto; Kelly opined that "North America is not the centre of the world, but it is the centre of the women's soccer world", and so should have been prioritised when scheduling matches in Australia and New Zealand. He suggested that many fans would want to watch Spanish star Alexia Putellas play but would not be able to without staying up late on weeknights, though some of the Spain matches were at more reasonable times for viewing in Western Europe. He described the fact not all games were played at appropriate times for North Americans as diminishing the importance of the World Cup, saying it was instead "a half-the-World Cup".

The amount of travel required for teams between host cities was also criticised; due to the size of Australia and the distance between it and New Zealand, all teams playing the group stage in Australia, and all teams from the New Zealand groups that qualify for knock-out stage, will travel over a thousand miles.

=== Broadcasting rights controversy ===
After FIFA president Gianni Infantino had said that comparatively low broadcasting rights bids for the tournament from the "big five" countries was an insult to "all women worldwide", and that FIFA had a "moral and legal obligation" to demand more money, he and FIFA were faced with criticism for causing the issue themselves and then lecturing on it. Former FIFA Council member Moya Dodd and sponsorship partner Ricardo Fort opined that FIFA should invest money from previous combined bids into the women's game (though past bids were for both Men's and Women's World Cups, FIFA attributed it all to the men's). Dave Roberts, who has worked with FIFA's in-house streaming broadcaster FIFA+, suggested that FIFA created the problem so that they could exclusively broadcast the tournament in the biggest markets themselves, while Glen Killane (executive director of Eurovision Sport) and former player Rebecca Sowden blamed FIFA for not discussing growth of women's football with broadcasters to assure them of financial viability.

FIFA also expressed similar dissatisfaction from bids from Japanese broadcasters with FIFA reasoning the low bids are more unreasonable considering that Japan is in a more convenient timezone than in its European counterparts.

FIFA had originally tendered for bids for broadcasting rights in June and July 2022, and had not expressed dissatisfaction with these bids until May 2023, almost a year later and shortly before the tournament was set to begin. Ofcom wrote that late rights acquisition was not the fault of broadcasters.

In a press conference the day before the tournament commenced, Infantino said that he would only talk about positive things until it was over, but still criticised broadcasters.

=== Sydney Football Stadium plaques ===
As part of FIFA's "clean stadium policy", host venues are required to remove their own sponsorship and branding (e.g. taking a neutral name for the tournament duration) from ten days before the tournament begins until 24 hours after it ends, in order to protect the commercial interests of FIFA's sponsorship partners. Sydney Football Stadium, commercially known as Allianz Stadium, fulfilled this but was also told to cover the plaques adjacent to some statues of sports personalities surrounding the stadium. Some of the plaques featured logos, which FIFA may have considered to be a commercial interest. From the start, FIFA advisors had suggested not covering the plaques, but FIFA did it anyway. When the plaques were covered in July 2023, it drew outcry in Australia, with people angered that their sporting heroes were being hidden, especially during a related event; the daughter of Johnny Warren, one of the players whose plaque was covered, said that it was "beyond stupid[,] but it is not the first thing that FIFA has done that is really dumb." FIFA immediately backtracked and said the plaques should be uncovered; however, this revealed that many had been damaged in the process, drawing further complaints.

=== Sponsorship deals ===
Criticism was levelled at FIFA for not giving the tournament "an opportunity to sell itself". FIFA only secured sponsorship deals late before the tournament began, not allowing time for adequate promotion of the tournament with commercial partners: major sponsors like McDonald's and Unilever signed up two months before the World Cup, and a TikTok collaboration was announced only a week before. The late threat of not selling broadcasting rights to major markets also stopped advertisers from partnering, at the risk of significantly fewer people tuning in. It was suggested that the late deals pointed to a lack of planning on FIFA's behalf, not considering that brands need time "to invest and create brilliant campaigns".

=== Wellington public transport ===
Metlink, which operates public transport in Wellington, provided free travel to World Cup ticket-holders. However, they underestimated the number of people who would be using this service; Metlink said that the poor weather in Wellington had caused more people to want to take public transport than typical, which was the reason they were not prepared for the number. Trains were overfilled and there were still fans unable to get on, missing the start of games. The public strongly criticised the planning operations, as well as the effect it had in preventing people accessing the World Cup. A separate bus company stepped in to provide replacement transportation, with Metlink saying that they were reviewing the service and would increase train carriages to the maximum possible from the third game onward, after the first two games demonstrated the demand. Metlink then said they would not run additional bus services if knockout games went to extra time; acknowledging that fans would have to leave the match early in order to travel home, Metlink said that adding buses would require reallocating drivers and the change in scheduling would have a knock-on effect to services the next day.

=== Legacy plan ===
==== Australia ====
The legacy plan, set to capitalise on the presence of the tournament in its host nations and cities, was criticised by Australian sports personalities and particularly Indigenous Australians. During the tournament, critics said that the Legacy 23 plan did not have enough focus on Indigenous groups in sports. Some criticised Football Australia, while the Indigenous Football Australia group wrote to FIFA, Football Australia, and the government. Football Australia responded by saying that the plan did not have a lack of funding for Indigenous football. Critics still felt that there was not enough designated funding in Legacy 23, and that there was no enduring commitment to First Nations football in the plan. Football Australia responded that there were other projects with funding devoted to football programmes "that had a specific First Nations element".

==== New Zealand ====
As part of the legacy plan, host cities were awarded funding to encourage women and girls into football. The New Zealand city of Hamilton spent $170,000 of their $500,000 grant to build a sculpture of a giant football in bright colours. Only $50,000 went to football programmes in the region. Critics alleged that the funding had been misused, and said the sculpture was unlikely to empower female football players. The sculpture was also unveiled at the same time as one of New Zealand's warm-up matches on 10 July, preventing fans from participating. The planners said that girls taking photos with the sculpture would inspire them.

=== Infantino absences ===
While Infantino had spent nearly a year before the 2022 FIFA World Cup in its host country Qatar in order to "fulfill his presidential duties", he had rarely visited Women's World Cup co-host New Zealand in the run-up to the 2023 tournament, and did not visit Australia at all. During the tournament – despite having made a point of attending every match of the 2022 Men's World Cup, and encouraging fans to buy more tickets to Women's World Cup matches by saying "do the right thing, come to watch the matches" – Infantino only watched a few matches in New Zealand at the start of the tournament before leaving for Tahiti. While the distances involved made it impossible to attend every match as he had in Qatar, he was criticised for staying less than a week, avoiding one of the host nations completely, and for cynicism (having said others were disrespectful towards the event).

=== Player payments rescinded ===
After several national associations had not paid their women's team players at previous tournaments, global player union FIFPRO had helped players from around the world organise an open letter requesting FIFA to provide equal pay; though FIFA did not oblige, it did promise ahead of the 2023 Women's World Cup to make sure that some of the prize money would be given to players. Initially stated to be paid separately to the association prize money, it was revealed that the FIFA player payments would instead go to the national associations and FIFA would make sure the associations paid the players. During the tournament, Infantino then further amended this to say that FIFA had "issued recommendations" to the associations and did not have the means to check how much money players received, while also suggesting that different tax situations in various countries could be a cause of some players receiving different amounts.

== Qualification ==
=== Russian participation ===
On 9 December 2019, the World Anti-Doping Agency (WADA) initially handed Russia a four-year ban from all major sporting events, after the Russian Anti-Doping Agency (RUSADA) was found non-compliant for handing over manipulated laboratory data to investigators. However, the Russian national team could have still entered qualification, as the ban only applies to final tournaments to decide the world champions. The WADA ruling allowed athletes who were not involved in doping or the coverup to compete, but not a team representing Russia that uses the Russian flag and anthem. The decision was appealed to the Court of Arbitration for Sport (CAS), which upheld WADA's ban but reduced it to two years. The CAS ruling also allowed the name "Russia" to be displayed on uniforms as long as the words "Neutral Athlete" or "Neutral Team" have equal prominence. Had Russia qualified for the tournament, its female players would have been able to use their country's name, flag and/or anthem at the Women's World Cup, unlike their male counterparts, as the reduced ban expired on 16 December 2022.

However, following the 2022 Russian invasion of Ukraine, FIFA announced a number of sanctions impacting Russia's participation in international football on 27 February 2022. Russia was prohibited from hosting international competitions, and the national team had been ordered to play all home matches behind closed doors in neutral countries. Under these sanctions, Russia would not be allowed to compete under the country's name, flag, or national anthem; like the Russian athletes' participation in events such as the Olympics, the team would compete under the abbreviation of their national federation, the Russian Football Union ("RFU"), rather than "Russia". The women's team had remained largely unaffected with participation in qualifications, albeit suspended "until further notice". On 2 May, UEFA announced further sanctions regarding the ongoing suspension, ruling the women's team ineligible to compete further in the UEFA qualifiers. As a result, the Russian team were automatically unable to qualify, with Denmark automatically qualifying due to no further competition.

=== Qualification process ===
UEFA's qualification process for the Women's World Cup did not include preliminary rounds, and as such each group contained both top and low level teams. Due to goal difference being used as a tie breaker, nations would be encouraged to run up the score when facing a weaker opponent; in November 2021, Belgium defeated Armenia 19–0 and England defeated Latvia 20–0, the latter heavily criticised due to England's high global ranking. People from both the England and Latvia camps said that the qualification process was too uneven, not posing a challenge for stronger teams while serving to demotivate weaker ones. UEFA subsequently changed to the Women's Nations League format as qualifiers for future major tournaments, with nations to compete against others of a similar level and able to move up and down in grouping based on performance.

All other confederations used their continental tournament as the qualifiers for the Women's World Cup, which global player union FIFPRO criticised, saying that they should be held separately to improve participation. It particularly highlighted CONMEBOL for using the Copa América as qualification into three international tournaments.

=== Zambia players eligibility ===
Ahead of the 2022 Women's Africa Cup of Nations (WAFCON), which also served as the Confederation of African Football (CAF) Women's World Cup qualification competition, the CAF requested the participating member associations to perform sex verification (or "gender eligibility") tests on all their players, despite FIFA only requiring such testing if concerns are raised about individuals. Four players for Zambia were ruled out due to failing the test administered by the Football Association of Zambia (FAZ), with the most prominent of them being captain Barbra Banda. What test the FAZ used was unclear, but Banda's agent has suggested it was not suitable. The FAZ offered the players hormone medication, but they reportedly all refused due to hearing of side effects in the case of Caster Semenya; Banda already took testosterone suppressant medication. With supporters of Banda displeased that the fan favourite would not be able to compete, the FAZ and CAF both blamed the other: the CAF said that the FAZ had simply not named the four players to their squad, with the FAZ arguing that they did not do so as they expected the CAF to ban them. The FAZ lodged an appeal against the CAF for the tests; the CAF response was brusque and maintained their same argument. Though Banda and the other players were unable to be involved in WAFCON, they were able to participate in the Women's World Cup.

=== Qualification conditions ===
The qualification series for the Women's World Cup was criticised by FIFPRO in a report published in June 2023 that assessed the different competitions. It said that players were put at risk through a variety of factors, describing many of the conditions as non-elite, and specifically highlighted that 70% of the players had not received an electrocardiogram – a type of heart health check considered routine in men's football – before continental competitions and 54% had not had any form of pre-tournament medical. Among the open responses, many players surveyed indicated that they were worried about mental load.

== Teams ==
=== Sexual misconduct allegations ===
==== Zambia – Bruce Mwape ====
In September 2022, the FAZ announced that it had referred accusations of sexual misconduct made against Bruce Mwape, the head coach of its women's team, to the police and FIFA for investigation. In July 2023, several testimonies were published, and a source close to the players revealed that they were receiving threats saying they would be punished for speaking out; the source also said that FAZ continued to employ Mwape because Zambia was performing well. With FIFA's investigation process being opaque and not acknowledged by the organisation, Human Rights Watch (HRW) criticised FIFA for not having "good governance measures to get sexual abuses out of sport"; a spokesperson also commented on FIFA's hypocrisy of partnering with UN Women for the tournament in a campaign to end violence against women, while not appearing to follow this itself.

When Zambia exited the tournament, players reported Mwape to FIFA with claims that he had groped a player during a training session before their final game; the players had waited until they were leaving to report for fears of repercussions. FIFA confirmed they had received this complaint; the FAZ said they had not received a complaint or heard of any issue, and stated their surprise when media asked them to comment about it. The FAZ provided a statement saying that all their training sessions were filmed but they had no footage to share.

==== Haiti – Yves Jean-Bart ====
The president of the Haitian Football Federation (FHF), Yves Jean-Bart, had been banned from football in 2020 after a FIFA investigation determined he had abused his position to sexually harass and abuse "various female players, including minors". However, this ban was overturned in early 2023 by the CAS. In July 2023, FIFA appealed the decision but was rejected by CAS. The CAS was criticised by HRW, primarily for not offering identity protection for witnesses and so discouraging them from testifying. HRW also criticised FIFA "for not ensuring that harm reduction practices were in place". Haitian players did not want to talk about Jean-Bart when interviewed ahead of the tournament, saying they were united and focused on the present and future to perform well at the World Cup instead.

==== Spain – Luis Rubiales ====
During the medal ceremony after Spain won the World Cup, Royal Spanish Football Federation (RFEF) president Luis Rubiales kissed Jennifer Hermoso on the lips. The action drew criticism, particularly towards the continued sexism in the sport, and calls for Rubiales's resignation. In a separate incident at the end of the match, Rubiales was filmed pointing to the Spain players before grabbing his crotch, with the obscene gesture further criticised as he was standing next to the teenage Infanta Sofía.

After Hermoso had said she did not expect or like the kiss, Rubiales entered the players' dressing room, reportedly throwing his arm around Hermoso and joking about marrying her in Ibiza. While on a layover returning from Australia, Rubiales published an apology video in which he said that he had no bad intentions and was sorry for distracting from the celebration, saying: "I have to apologise, learn from this, and understand that when you are president you have to be more careful."

Rubiales faced heavy criticism for his actions, and calls for him to resign from various Spanish footballing bodies as well as the government. He and Vilda tried to make Hermoso support Rubiales, issuing a fake statement when she would not. Hermoso issued a statement through her union, Futpro, with the union saying the kiss was unacceptable and that they were working on seeing it punished.

The RFEF called an extraordinary general meeting for 25 August.

=== Players' disputes with national associations ===
In the run-up to the Women's World Cup there were multiple instances of disputes between collective players and their national football associations relating to matters of professionalism. The Athletic noted that these disputes, no matter their scope or resolution status, "will all have caused disruption of some degree before the World Cup... It is, to say the least, not ideal."

Overview of public disputes
Team	Focus of dispute	Duration	Withdrawn players
Spain (I)	Conditions	September 2022–August 2023	Laia Aleixandri, Ona Batlle (temporarily returned), Aitana Bonmatí (temporarily returned), Mariona Caldentey (temporarily returned), Nerea Eizagirre, Lola Gallardo, Lucía García, Patricia Guijarro, Mapi León, Ainhoa Moraza, Leila Ouahabi, Sandra Paños, Andrea Pereira, Clàudia Pina, Amaiur Sarriegi; Jennifer Hermoso and Irene Paredes did not withdraw but were excluded from the squad, and were able to return
Canada	Pay	since February 2023	
France	Organisation	March 2023	Kadidiatou Diani, Marie-Antoinette Katoto, Wendie Renard (all returned)
Jamaica	Organisation	since June 2023	
South Africa	Pay, conditions	July 2023	Kholosa Biyana, Noxolo Cesane, Andile Dlamini, Karabo Dhlamini, Bongeka Gamede, Sibulele Holweni, Refiloe Jane, Melinda Kgadiete, Thembi Kgatlana, Nomvula Kgoale, Hildah Magaia, Fikile Magama, Tiisetso Makhubela, Noko Matlou, Bambanani Mbane, Kebotseng Moletsane, Robyn Moodaly, Linda Motlhalo, Lebohang Ramalepe, Gabriela Salgado, Jermaine Seoposenwe, Wendy Shongwe, Kaylin Swart (all returned)
England	Pay	since July 2023	
Nigeria	Pay	since July 2023	
Zambia	Pay, conditions	since July 2023	
Spain (II)	Conditions	since August 2023	81 players, including all above and the entire World Cup squad

==== Spain ====
Ahead of and during the 2022 Women's Euro, Spanish players attempted to express concerns about the quality of their national team training. Experiencing push-back from the RFEF, fifteen players withdrew from selection in September 2022. Spain manager Jorge Vilda recalled three of the fifteen players to the squad for the Women's World Cup, as well as two players, Alexia Putellas and Irene Paredes, who had supported them. When asked about the squad, Vilda did not talk about the extended absence or the missing players. Putellas and Paredes had both been captains of the squad before the dispute; despite their recall, the captaincy was not returned to them, though Vilda said he hoped they would help lead the team. Reportedly, Putellas' leadership was crucial to the players who returned doing so, and to bringing unity back to the Spanish squad.

==== Canada ====
In February 2023, the Canadian team announced they were planning to strike indefinitely due to unpaid salaries from the Canadian Soccer Association (Canada Soccer) as well as other issues with the association. After sitting out of training ahead of the 2023 SheBelieves Cup, the players returned to the team when Canada Soccer threatened to sue them; Canada Soccer then began mediation with the players to resolve many of the other issues, though pay was still a "sticking point" in June 2023.

In June 2023, the Canadian government ordered a financial audit of Canada Soccer, labelling this a requirement to receive future government funds due to concerns over Canada Soccer's financial transparency following the team's strike threat. In reference to the issues, captain Christine Sinclair said on 22 June 2023 that the players were "not at a point where [they're] not getting on a plane, but time's coming where [they] want it done".

On 1 July 2023, Canada Soccer announced that it may need to file bankruptcy, among a list of possible outcomes, as it did not have enough funds to resolve problems, maintain its squads, or develop football in Canada.

==== France ====
In March 2023, senior players in the French team said they would withdraw from the squad because of differences. The French Football Federation (FFF) held its own investigation and found that the issues between players and management had "reached a point of no return", and that the fracture would negatively impact the team's Women's World Cup campaign. As a result, the FFF fired coach Corinne Diacre later that month.

==== Jamaica ====
In June 2023, Jamaican players shared an open letter on social media, criticising the Jamaica Football Federation (JFF) for lack of planning, resources and funding. Indicating that these were longstanding issues, the players highlighted that logistics of training camps should not be their own concern ahead of a World Cup. By the end of June, two online crowdfunding campaigns had been opened to raise a combined $175,000 to fund the training camp and travel expenses. ESPN criticised the attitude of the JFF, which it said gave the sense that the JFF thought the reaction from the players was "out of the blue" despite a similar issue occurring at the previous World Cup, and described the need for players' parents to individually crowd-fund as depressing.

==== South Africa ====
On 2 July 2023, South Africa were scheduled to play their final warm-up match before the Women's World Cup. Due to disputes with the South African Football Association (SAFA) over issues including pay, with SAFA refusing to include salary in contracts, preparation and training quality, and pitch quality, the entire squad withdrew from the match.

Without any World Cup players, the match still went ahead, though was delayed, with SAFA asking local teams to send players so they could field a team; one player was 13. The team lost 0–5 to Botswana, a nation ranked 96 places below South Africa. Coach Desiree Ellis did not comment on the issues in post-match interviews. One SAFA official described the players as unreasonable, saying SAFA did not need to pay them as FIFA was; another official leaked to local press that the organisation thought the players were "mercenaries" and "traitors".

Former captain Portia Modise spoke out against SAFA on 4 July, saying that the same issues had existed when she played and that SAFA always promised to work on them but never did. Modise also criticised Ellis not supporting the players. The next day, the Motsepe Foundation, which had been set up by Confederation of African Football (CAF) president Patrice Motsepe, stepped in to give money to the players. Captain Refiloe Jane later said that the dispute had been settled before the tournament, with the confirmation that the team would receive the standard pay from FIFA and money from the Motsepe Foundation donation.

==== England ====
Media publications on behalf of the England team also expressed frustration towards their association on 2 July 2023, following a breakdown in negotiations between player union the Professional Footballers' Association (PFA), representing players, and the FA: the FA did not want to give bonuses to the players despite having done so at previous tournaments, feeling that they did not need to pay players now that FIFA was, as well as already funding the team's travel and accommodation. FIFA had said that its payments should be "the base level and not a ceiling" for player pay; the England team statement said they felt that the FA was acting like a federation aiming for the bare minimum and not a world leader, with players from other major teams (including the United States, Spain and Australia) at the Women's World Cup set to receive bonuses. The team said they hoped the issue would be resolved before the tournament began and that a collective agreement would be put in place for the future; in 2020, the FA had promised to pay the women's team the same fees and bonuses as the men's team going forward. England head coach Sarina Wiegman said that while she was not part of the payment dispute, and that the players were not letting it affect them during training, she hoped it would be resolved positively before the tournament began.

The dispute came as part of wider frustration regarding commercial opportunities for the team, with the FA having also restricted players from making appearances for sponsors ahead of the Women's World Cup, an important marketing period, further limiting their ability to make money. As part of the media announcement on 2 July, the team said they had been pressured "not to rock the boat" so close to the tournament. Lucy Bronze later explained that they found having to push "frustrating", but said it is the way improvements are achieved in women's sport. Some players had also previously been unhappy at being put in the middle of the release date conflicts between the FA and their clubs, with the commercial strategy said to further strain the relationship.

On 5 July, the FA announced that they would allow players to use social media at certain times during the tournament in order to fulfill sponsorship deals, having previously announced a complete social media blackout stated to be in order to prevent distractions. The relaxed terms were agreed to by the team, though with the understanding that there will be further discussions after the World Cup and before any future tournaments. The discussions around bonus pay resumed, with reports that the FA had made an offer for pay supplements from commercial partners. The team was reportedly considering forms of strike action short of affecting their participation, including potentially boycotting England media duties. The FA did not change their stance on paying players, but acknowledged the wider concern of the commercial strategy needed improvement. On 18 July, four days before their first match, the players themselves published an open letter which said they were pausing the discussions until after the World Cup, with the full intention to resume; it also noted that they had first gone to the FA with their commercial concerns in 2022. The PFA chief executive, Maheta Molango, criticised the FA for underestimating the players and for resisting progress. The FA was reportedly taken by surprise that the players would take the "extraordinary action" of issuing a statement themselves.

==== Nigeria ====
In June 2023, there was controversy when Nigeria coach Randy Waldrum announced his team selection, with suggestion that the Nigeria Football Federation (NFF) had pressured him into choices. The player list remained the same as previous selections, except for the omission of veteran player Ngozi Okobi in favour of teenager Deborah Abiodun; the latter had shortly before committed to join the University of Pittsburgh soccer team, which Waldrum also coaches, so he knew her current fitness. There was suggestion that Waldrum received pressure from the NFF to drop Okobi, but an official said that the squad list was all Waldrum's choices. Waldrum said that he was choosing blind due to lack of national training camps, caused by lack of NFF financial support; the Nigeria team was supposed to begin training for the Women's World Cup in June but were unable to, with Waldrum unable to assess the players before needing to announce a squad list and so going off the fitness of players at previous camps. The Nigeria team began training after arriving in Australia in July 2023. It was later revealed that the NFF had canceled the earlier training camp because they considered it a "waste of resources".

On 7 July, the Nigeria team announced that they were planning to boycott their opening game of the World Cup, set to be against Canada in Group B, due to the NFF informing them that they would not pay the players bonuses, either. The captain later denied rumours that the team had planned to boycott the whole World Cup. Nigeria players had staged a training strike, for the same reasons, in July 2022 ahead of the 2022 Women's Africa Cup of Nations. Upon the team's arrival in Australia, six members of the Nigeria team acted as representatives and held a meeting, during which agreed that they would be prepared to strike, especially as the squad morale "plummeted" when they were told they would not receive bonuses nor the 30% cut of FIFA grant money to the federation that was supposed to be earmarked for players.

Waldrum separately continued speaking out against the NFF, including defending the players and publicly saying that the federation had cut players from the national team unilaterally when they gave feedback that the NFF had requested but did not want to be so negative. He said that his players do not have the same pride in being selected as players for the United States do, as the Nigerians are not treated with respect. The NFF first prevented Waldrum from bringing assistant coach Lauren Gregg to the World Cup, and then gave a statement calling him deficient. Waldrum accused them of stealing money intended for the team, and on 8 July the rumour emerged that the NFF were considering firing him.

==== Zambia ====
On the first day of the World Cup, a media publication for the Zambia team reported that the players had not been paid since the Tokyo Olympics in 2021. The players boycotted training for two days ahead of their World Cup warm-up match against Germany, in which Zambia recorded a surprise victory, and mounted silent protests while at training camp in New Zealand. One expression of this was not singing in usual tradition during travel. On 17 July, the president of Zambia, Hakainde Hichilema, held a video meeting with the team and suggested that the payment issue would be resolved, telling them "Do your part and your government will do its part".

The players were also reportedly made to sign a code of conduct for training camp, imposing restrictions on them.

=== Players' disputes with coaching staff ===
==== Norway ====
In the press room after Norway lost the opening match to New Zealand in a surprise defeat, Norwegian players Caroline Graham Hansen and Ingrid Syrstad Engen spoke about where they felt the approach had been lacking. Ahead of Norway's second match, Graham Hansen missed a training day and a media appearance due to a reported sore throat, though manager Hege Riise said she was fully fit. Reported in the days before, both the players were then removed from the starting lineup for the second match, against Switzerland; there was particular focus on the benching of Graham Hansen, considered one of the best players. News media reported that there were growing tensions between Norway players and coaching staff. Riise received criticism, before and after the match, for benching an important player; she defended it as a tactical decision. Graham Hansen and Syrstad Engen were used as substitutes in the match, but the team still recorded a draw.

After the second game, Graham Hansen answered media questions about how she was frustrated at the benching; that she had felt "stepped on" in the national team for a year; that Law of Jante ideals are strong in the team; and that she was shown no respect, in a series of responses that drew significant attention. Though speaking about her experience, she did not answer questions that would implicate anyone in particular. In response to hearing Graham Hansen's comments, Riise told the media "bluntly" that she was not stepped on.

The next day, Graham Hansen made a surprise appearance in Riise's press conference, reading a statement from a mobile phone to say that she had been too emotional and while she still meant her statements, she was sorry for voicing them and distracting attention from the football. She also gave an explanation for her comment about being "stepped on", saying that one of the first things Riise had done when she took over a year earlier was to remove Graham Hansen from the team's leadership group; Graham Hansen said that she still disagreed with this, but should not have mentioned it, either. Graham Hansen had withdrawn from the team with a heart condition shortly after Riise's appointment, returning months later. Riise said that she forgave her, with Guro Reiten adding that Graham Hansen had sent a message to the team asking for forgiveness. Syrstad Engen then told Norwegian media that she agreed with Graham Hansen and was in the same situation, understanding why her teammate had made the statements. Julie Blakstad said that she and the team were not impressed that Graham Hansen had made the statements; Reuters reported that many of the Norway players sympathise with Graham Hansen, even if they did not want her to talk about it. Before Norway's third match, Norwegian media published "a detailed report" of issues the players have with Riise's management.

Ada Hegerberg also did not play in Norway's second match after being named to the starting lineup, pulling out with a groin injury after the anthems; her absence was considered suspicious by some, though, which noted Hegerberg had previously spent six years away from the team while vocally criticising them. After the match, Riise said she did not know about Hegerberg's injury and had not spoken to either Hegerberg or medical staff about an injury.

==== Republic of Ireland ====
Shortly before the tournament, allegations of the Republic of Ireland's head coach Vera Pauw being abusive while in a former coaching position resurfaced. Whenever this was brought up with Ireland players, they did not give Pauw full support, with their silence reportedly being loud. In July 2023, Ireland captain Katie McCabe admitted that she and Pauw had clashed but kept professional. After Ireland's final game, Pauw admitted that McCabe had asked for changes in the match that Pauw did not allow; McCabe then posted on social media with a zipped face emoji (🤐), with the BBC saying "You can read into that whatever you want", but suggesting that it showed the feud between players and Pauw had been made public. Pauw was also, with Ireland being knocked out after two matches, feuding with the FAI Women over her potential renewal. In her last pre-match press conference of the tournament she criticised the FAI Women for being "unfair", saying she deserved to know her employment future and suggesting that the FAI Women were also harming the players by leaving them uncertain as to their coach and in the position of being asked about the issue.

=== Republic of Ireland chant video ===
Upon winning a match against Scotland that saw the Republic of Ireland qualify for the World Cup, many Irish players performed "Ooh, ahh, up the Ra", a chant that originates from a Scottish football song and which glorifies the guerrilla Irish Republican Army. A video of this was uploaded to social media by one of the players and met with criticism. There was particular criticism from the people of Birmingham; several of the Ireland team play for Birmingham City, and it was the site of the 1974 Birmingham pub bombings. Police Scotland investigated the incident and the Football Association of Ireland, Women's (FAI Women) was fined €20,000 by UEFA for violating rules of decency; the team offered an apology and said they had spoken to the players, with Birmingham City also disciplining players.

=== Kheira Hamraoui exclusion ===
When France's team selection was announced, midfielder Kheira Hamraoui was not included. Manager Hervé Renard said that this was purely a sporting decision, but Hamraoui rejected this, calling her exclusion an injustice; the pair had reportedly had long discussions about the possible selection. In 2021, Hamraoui had been the victim of an attack, with reports the police suspected jealousy from other French players was the motive. The attack and the fallout caused deep fractures between Hamraoui and other players, though former France manager Diacre had included her in the squad in February 2023. Hamraoui and her agent had felt the communication with the team was positive, with the agent giving the example of the United States as a successful team even though "all the players don't like each other."

=== Colombia flight ===
The Colombian Football Federation (FCF) had booked the Colombia staff and players on two flights: the staff and some players to depart Colombia on 8 July, with most of the players following the next day. The players were booked into first or business class (a requirement per FIFA's updated rules on player accommodation) but airline LATAM had overbooked the section and moved the team to a later flight, which would interfere with their camp schedule. The FCF managed to move eleven players to an Avianca flight for the original departure time, but was still criticised for their logistics not being able to include everyone on the same flight.

=== Haka imitations ===
The official social media accounts of two football associations, the RFEF (Spain) and the Royal Dutch Football Association (KNVB; Netherlands), uploaded videos of their training camps in New Zealand that each featured clips of players appearing to imitate haka, specifically the Ka Mate often performed by the New Zealand men's rugby union team (All Blacks). Haka are Māori ritual dances and, while having associations with sports in New Zealand, it is controversial for non-Māori people to perform haka, even when doing so correctly, if they do not have permission. The videos of the Spanish and Dutch players showed them "attempting" the haka and then laughing; the RFEF quickly took down their video, but was still heavily criticised in comments. They did not respond to questions about the video, but the Spanish captain apologised to tribal elders ahead of the tournament on behalf of the players. The KNVB also later took down their video, saying that there was no reference to the haka at all and that the video had shown players doing "an exercise that was focused on channeling your inner strength". Days later, one of the Dutch players made an apology post for her part in the video, while saying she had meant no disrespect. FIFA responded to questions about the videos by saying they would not comment; they had previously sent communications to teams about cultural respect while in Australia and New Zealand.

=== Australia video ===
On 17 July, the players of co-hosts Australia, supported by Football Australia, published a video criticising FIFA for the tournament prize money continuing to be several times less than that of the men's competition. They also noted the positive developments in their own pay since establishing a collective bargaining agreement in 2019, criticising other national associations for not negotiating with players over payment. When Infantino was asked about the video and the wider issue of pay disparity on the day before the tournament, he declined to comment, saying "to focus on the positives" and that "if somebody is still not happy about something then I am so sorry."

=== Zambia kit ===
Zambia arrived in New Zealand without any football boots or shinpads, as the team does not provide custom kit. They expected to be able to purchase these items while in Hamilton, the city they were based in; football is less popular than rugby union in New Zealand, limiting their options and forcing them to go to other cities to find what they needed.

=== Replica goalkeeper shirts ===
On the first day of the World Cup, it was revealed that Nike does not produce replica women's goalkeeper shirts for commercial sale when an interview with Mary Earps, England goalkeeper and The Best FIFA Women's Goalkeeper, was published. In it, Earps said that she had been trying to find a way for the shirts to be produced, including discussing with both the FA and Nike and offering to front production costs herself, for some time. Acknowledging that it sounded frivolous compared to other issues, Earps said she was quite hurt by the fact that fans cannot buy women's goalkeeper shirts and that it sends the wrong message to young players that goalkeeping is not an aspirational position to play. Nike produce replica men's goalkeeper shirts in limited numbers, with Earps saying that a smaller run is very different to not being available at all. In early matches of the tournament, the starring performance of goalkeepers was a particular trend, and cartoonist David Squires illustrated a comic mocking the irony of this in light of Nike's decision.

=== United States national anthem ===
Most of the players of the United States team refused to sing their national anthem before matches, part of wider political U.S. national anthem protests that had been ongoing since 2016. The action, like other anthem protests, was widely criticised by different groups in the United States. American journalist Megyn Kelly said that player Megan Rapinoe had driven the protest, saying Rapinoe had "poisoned" the rest of the team to hate the United States. In 2019, Rapinoe had said she would never sing the anthem again as a protest against injustice in the United States and the response of sports to punish other players protesting the anthem. Kelly called the team "morons" and "shameful", while some American fans called them disrespectful on social media; the squad's two captains and Julie Ertz did sing the anthem.

== Player welfare ==
=== "ACL club" ===
Ahead of the Women's World Cup, concerns of anterior cruciate ligament (ACL) injuries in women's sports grew, with a number of high-profile injuries and noted lack of women-focused research despite the greater likelihood of women suffering the injury. In June 2023 it was reported that there would be at least 36 players likely to have participated in the tournament either missing it with or having just returned from ACL injury, dubbed the "ACL club", including England captain Leah Williamson and striker Beth Mead, Catarina Macario of the United States, and France's Delphine Cascarino. The injury being the cause of so many significant players being unavailable for the World Cup was a cause of controversy over the lack of measures taken around the injury, as well as reportedly creating tensions between national teams and the players' clubs.

With several injuries affecting the England team ahead of the World Cup, Caroline Nokes, a British MP and chair of the Women and Equalities Committee, petitioned major football boot brands and manufacturers to provide information on their approach to design and any women-specific designs they produce. The poor fit of football boots designed for typical male feet has been suggested as one factor increasing the risk of injury to women's players.

Swedish coach and pundit Jonas Eidevall criticised the pitch quality of the Allianz Stadium, suggesting the turf was too dry and so studs getting caught in the ground (which can cause injury) was more likely, during the group stage match between England and Denmark. In the first half, Lauren James had attempted a knee slide after scoring but fell over, and Keira Walsh had caught her boot and had to be taken off with a knee, though not ACL, injury. England players who were asked did not think there was an issue with the pitch.

=== Squad size ===
Due to effects of the COVID-19 pandemic, squads were expanded in 2021 from 23 to 26 players, with the new limit applying to various international tournaments, including the 2022 FIFA World Cup. Despite this, FIFA set the squad size limit for the 2023 Women's World Cup at 23 players again. It did not give a reason for the decision, but sport media said that FIFA preferred fewer players and suggested that it did not see the same fitness concerns at the 2023 World Cup as at the 2022 World Cup, due to the latter taking place in the middle of many domestic football seasons (in Northern Hemisphere winter), while the former will take place during a typical break in the summer. Several top women's team coaches, including 2022 Euro finalists Wiegman and Martina Voss-Tecklenburg, asked FIFA to allow 26-person squads at the 2023 World Cup, with England manager Wiegman saying in November 2022 that larger squad sizes would be "a necessity to safeguard players' welfare". Wiegman reiterated the message when she named her squad in May 2023, saying that a larger squad does not prevent injury, but gives the option to use other players if someone needs rest or has a minor injury. She added that the congested international schedule for women exacerbated the fitness concern, also asking for better scheduling.

=== European mandatory release date conflicts ===
Wiegman also expressed frustration over the European mandatory release date – when clubs must allow players called up to the World Cup to join their national team – proposed by FIFA, considering it too late to adequately prepare for a major tournament, especially one on the opposite side of the world. The mandatory release date is 10 July 2023; there were initial widespread criticisms from various national teams. These national associations, in particular the FA, objected to the late release date for the reason it may have a negative impact on player welfare if they have inadequate training. European clubs were reluctant to release players earlier, as FIFA's protection programme (which compensates clubs if their players are injured on international duty) would only cover from the release date. Due to the criticism, FIFA announced in May 2023 that the protection would be extended to cover "from the moment that players leave their club for their duties with their national team until their return". The European Club Association (ECA), which represents domestic clubs in European leagues, criticised the national associations for ignoring the date and announcing earlier training camps, but acknowledged 10 July was too late. After these criticisms and discussion with the ECA, FIFA announced an extended release window, starting on 23 June 2023. The ECA felt that any earlier and the national teams (several of which did start earlier) could be causing their players mental fatigue.

The release date caused even further conflict and debate in England, with their training camp starting on 19 June. The FA and Wiegman had given extensive criticisms of the late release date, saying that their plans for England's preparation had been made by experts months in advance to benefit player welfare and were at risk of being disrupted, adding that the plans would be hard to change due to FIFA announcing the release date so late. England players were drawn into the conflict by being asked outside of their clubs if they would show up for the planned training camp, and told they would not play a preparation match if they did not; Beth Mead, who was not part of the squad due to injury, said that players "don't want to be the middleman" in club and country disputes, as it causes them unnecessary stress. While Wiegman was said to be reasonable, FA leaders reportedly "burned bridges" with its players' clubs, especially those in the Women's Super League (WSL), by insisting on the earlier release and by involving players; in the hours before the 2023 UEFA Women's Champions League final, the FA held an emergency meeting in Eindhoven (the location of the final) involving representatives from most of the clubs and lead figures in the FA. The clubs were primarily unhappy that they had not been consulted and that the FA was unwilling to compromise, but all WSL clubs as well as Barcelona allowed their players to be released early. Though The Guardian opined that the FA put its World Cup ambition ahead of good club relations, it pointed out that FIFA was ultimately to blame, as it had created "a mess of a calendar" in women's football that was overloaded with tournaments.

=== Netherlands training ground ===
The training ground for the Netherlands team in New Zealand (ahead of travelling to their base camp when the tournament began) was the Bay Oval, a cricket ground. The team had been promised ahead of the tournament that the ground would be made suitable – including removal of the cricket pitch, a hard surface, from the middle of the ground – but this did not happen. Manager Andries Jonker expressed concern for the welfare of his players; highlighting the biomechanical dangers of running from grass onto the hard surface, as well as potential harm if falling onto it, Jonker said the team were unable to do any full pitch practice or play practice games in their training as the pitch would be unavoidable. Other exercises, which could be spaced around the pitch, went ahead. He said the alternative solutions presented to them were to fly to their base camp earlier, which would disrupt the training schedule, or to use a training ground in a city an hour and a half away, which they considered excessive travel.

=== Ireland–Colombia warm-up match ===
Several warm-up matches were played on 14 July 2023 after teams arrived in the host nations. One of these, between the Republic of Ireland and Colombia, was abandoned after 23 minutes of game time due to what the FAI Women called "overly physical" play on behalf of the Colombian team; the FCF responded that their players were trained in the spirit of "healthy competition" but they respected Ireland "prefer[ring] not to continue". The Irish team staff had spoken to match officials about the game being played too physically for a warm-up friendly after several rough challenges and a particularly hard tackle from an unnamed Colombian player that saw Denise O'Sullivan taken to hospital during the early stages of the match. The officials agreed to end the match. Ireland coach Vera Pauw had already asked Colombia coach Nelson Abadía to calm his players after an earlier tackle on Ruesha Littlejohn. After Colombian player Daniela Caracas said that the Ireland players were "just girls" who should "eat shit" for worrying about the rough play, Pauw noted that her team were known for their physical play themselves, but the level of Colombia's physicality had been "outside the rules of the game". Pauw also confirmed that O'Sullivan had not suffered serious injury, but she was still unable to train.

=== Linda Caicedo ===
The Colombia team was criticised first for playing Linda Caicedo in their group stage match against Germany, and then for not taking her off. In training a few days before the match, Caicedo collapsed seemingly unconscious and had to be taken to hospital by ambulance, with the team releasing a statement saying she had only been tired, but had recovered. During the match, in which she scored, Caicedo appeared to collapse again and was attended by medical staff but not substituted until the sixth minute of injury time (90+6').

== Human rights ==
=== Saudi Arabia and Qatar sponsorships ===
On 1 February 2023, it was reported that Visit Saudi, the tourism board of Saudi Arabia, was going to be one of the main sponsors of the tournament. FIFA had pursued the sponsorship without consulting either of Football Australia or New Zealand Football, the host football associations. Shortly after the announcement, the World Cup Organising Committee asked FIFA for clarification on the sponsorship and how the partnership would work. HRW said the decision showed disregard for how Saudi Arabia treats women, with the decision called sportswashing by human rights campaigns. Another major concern was the mixed message of the partnership as many players at the World Cup, as members of the LGBT+ community, would not be able to visit Saudi Arabia without fear of prosecution. Players and coaches including Alex Morgan, Emma Hayes, Becky Sauerbrunn and Megan Rapinoe publicly denounced the deal and urged FIFA not to partner with Visit Saudi. In March 2023, Football Australia and New Zealand Football publicly opposed the potential sponsorship; later in the month, FIFA announced they would drop the sponsorship deal, though this reportedly angered Saudi officials.

Infantino described the reaction from players and associations as a "storm in a teacup", also calling Football Australia hypocrites due to Australia having diplomatic relations with Saudi Arabia.

Some people in Australia criticised the fact that little attention was given to Qatar Airways' late sponsorship of the tournament, especially compared to the backlash for the 2022 men's tournament; Qatar has similar human rights issues to Saudi Arabia and, in 2020, several Australian women were forced at gunpoint to do an invasive gynaecological strip search by the local authorities while on a layover in Doha after an abandoned baby was found in the airport.

=== OneLove armband ===
The FIFA "Unite For Inclusion" armband created for the tournament (top) is notably similar to the OneLove armband (bottom), which FIFA has banned.

Following condemnation of FIFA in the Western world for banning the OneLove rainbow armband at the Men's World Cup in 2022, FIFA agreed to pursue discussion of captains wearing the armband in advance of the Women's World Cup to "have a solution in place" before the start of the tournament. In May 2023, two top-level female executives at FIFA, Fatma Samoura and Sarai Bareman, announced to the media that discussions had begun, including consulting with national teams and their captains. On 30 June 2023, FIFA announced that both OneLove and Stonewall rainbow armbands would be banned at the tournament, with the same regulations as the Men's World Cup. They instead provided eight options of armbands: seven resembled the inclusivity armbands of the Men's World Cup, with the other armband, which bears the slogan "Unite for Inclusion", featuring a heart logo of the same colours and meaning of the OneLove armband. FIFA said that after "open talks with stakeholders" they decided to use the alternative armbands, with the slogans a product of consultation with participating teams and the United Nations. Like the OneLove armband, the Unite for Inclusion armband intentionally does not use the colours of the rainbow pride flag. The Telegraph debated whether to consider the look-a-like armband a "significant compromise" or not, as FIFA's armband regulations were just as restrictive anyway and players would still be sanctioned for wearing the OneLove armband.

In the May 2023 announcement, Samoura and Bareman had conceded that football was an appropriate platform for players to advocate for human rights, with Bareman saying that FIFA wants players to "feel [like] they were able to use their voice" at the tournament and that they "understand, very well, that our female footballers like to use the sport as a platform to speak about issues that they're passionate about and one of those is the rainbow". About 1 in 8 of all players at the tournament were openly LGBTQ+, including a quarter of captains. The host nations also have LGBT rights, with many competing teams having regularly worn rainbow armbands for years.

Samoura opined that there would be less tension around the armband than at the Men's World Cup due to discussions having taken place beforehand. Despite this, The New York Times reported that the discussions between FIFA and the women's teams had not run smoothly, with teams frustrated at times after FIFA indicated as early as March 2023 that OneLove armbands would not be allowed. Days after the May announcement, Football Australia CEO James Johnson said that the talks with FIFA were positive and that he expected there would be players wearing rainbow armbands at the World Cup, but did not comment on if OneLove armbands would be permitted. Australian sport network Optus Sport noted that the cultural differences that were part of the controversy for the Men's World Cup in Qatar, where homosexuality is illegal, should not be a factor in a decision for the Women's World Cup. Still, the spokespersons did not indicate that FIFA would permit the OneLove armband, instead saying they were seeking a solution with "balance". Samoura told Optus in May 2023: "if there is a way for us to promote human rights and the One Love band is a way to do it, we should find common ground with whoever would like to flag issues we don't discuss enough."

Ahead of the announcement of the permitted armbands on 30 June 2023, FIFA sent a letter to all participating nations with the armband rules, intending to prevent the breakdown in relations that occurred at the Men's World Cup when FIFA had declined to communicate and banned the OneLove armband only hours before matches were played. Johnson, who had been part of the discussions, acknowledged that FIFA had made progress since Qatar 2022 but said that FIFA's armband options "didn't go as far" as the representatives wanted or expected.

Outsports was pleased that FIFA had not upheld the complete ban of rainbow symbols as in Qatar, but was still disappointed, while the i opined that FIFA had turned the intended activism into "meaningless 'live laugh love' symbols", saying the armbands matter as a point of symbolism, allyship and visibility. It criticised FIFA on several fronts: for not including any meaningful messaging and instead using buzzword slogans on their approved armbands; for restricting armbands in the first place, saying that minorities cannot use their voice or express choices when they only have pre-selected options; and for not explicitly including an armband that mentions sexuality. The Athletic levelled the same criticisms, and Johnson said he was disappointed in FIFA for banning rainbow armbands and not offering one supportive of LGBTQI. Sam Kerr, the openly lesbian captain of co-host Australia, said ahead of the tournament in July 2023 that every team had wanted to wear the OneLove armband but would not due to FIFA threatening sporting sanctions; Kerr said that they will use their voices in multiple other ways instead.

Actions during the tournament considered to be promoting LGBTQ+ visibility in ways other than an armband, also generally considered criticisms of FIFA's ban, include New Zealand's Ali Riley painting her fingernails in the colours of the transgender flag on one hand and rainbow pride flag on the other; venue Lang Park lighting up in a rainbow at halftime during the England–Haiti match; and South Africa's Thembi Kgatlana dyeing part of her hair in rainbow colours.

=== Transgender inclusion debate ===
While doing publicity for the tournament and in light of FIFA beginning a review into its transgender policy following a 2022 announcement, American player and LGBTQ+ rights advocate Megan Rapinoe said that she would support the inclusion of transgender players in her squad. As well as advocating for the human rights of transgender athletes, Rapinoe also expressed her anger that women's sports, historically inclusive, were being weaponised to discriminate; that people who do not care for women's sports claim they do when they want to remove transgender athletes; and that these people did not try to achieve equity or fairness in other elements of women's sports, but used the concept of fairness as an excuse.

Rapinoe's comments were unpopular among American conservatives, many of whom responded with insults, comments about Rapinoe's impending retirement, and criticisms of the Nike advert describing her as an "All-American hero".

The tournament features Canada's Quinn, the first transgender player at a World Cup; Quinn was assigned female at birth. Broadcaster Piers Morgan, a vocal critic of transgender athletes in women's sport, launched a tirade directed at Quinn after Canada's first match. Occasionally misgendering Quinn, Morgan said that he did not believe someone could be non-binary and transgender, and that people who do not identify as women should not play in the Women's World Cup. Canada Soccer said that there will always be people with closed minds.

=== Iranian protests solidarity ===
The Brazil team travelled to Australia on a Boeing 787 Dreamliner featuring images of Mahsa Amini, who died in custody of the Iranian Morality Police in 2022, and Amir Reza Nasr Azadani, an Iranian men's footballer serving a 26-year prison sentence for protesting Amini's death, on the tail wing. The plane also included decals along the fuselage with messages saying that nobody should be forced to wear a headdress, and nobody should be killed for speaking out against it. After the action drew attention to the team, The Sydney Morning Herald reported that the Brazilian Football Confederation (CBF) had chartered the plane and was not responsible for the decals; the plane reportedly belongs to Argentine aviator and filmmaker Enrique Piñeyro.

== Media incidents ==
=== Pundits and commentators ===
Ahead of Australia's opening match, pundits for free-to-air network Channel 7 in Australia talked over the Welcome to Country speech, an Aboriginal ritual that was performed before the matches held in this nation. A dance from an Aboriginal dance clan accompanying the ritual was not broadcast, with pre-match punditry shown instead. With the World Cup having heavily promoted the inclusion of the native peoples of its hosts, and the hope from the people involved in the performance that it would get more visibility, the network's choice was controversial. Aunty Julie, the speaker for the Welcome to Country, described people speaking over her words as "culturally devastating" and a manner of silencing her culture. Australian viewers on social media said that the move, which was generally found disrespectful, was something they expected of Channel 7.

During this match, viewers in Australia noted that the pundits for Channel 7 were constantly discussing how many mothers were playing, with a journalist noting that how many fathers are on the pitch is not mentioned in men's games. There was particular criticism for Channel 7 commentator David Basheer, who said that "motherhood hasn't blunted [Katrina Gorry's] competitive instincts". Some viewers considered this to have sexist overtones, including other journalists taking to social media to remark that it is insulting to think a woman's skills would be compromised by giving birth. Others responded to criticism of Basheer by saying that his comments were just clunky and he had supported women's football for a long time. When Gorry was asked about it, she said that she does not let that kind of comment get to her personally.

Optus Sport, the main Australian broadcaster and a partner of the Women's World Cup, was criticised for using two male pundits to deliver pitchside commentary, with no women. Optus then made a "fiery" social media post defending the choice, with the male pundits in question also responding negatively to individual social media users who criticised the lack of female pundits.

The New Zealand network Sky Sport received complaints for its lack of New Zealander commentators during matches, especially those contested by the home team, for the opening matches; the broadcaster had not hired any of its own commentators and instead used FIFA's global feed. There was particular criticism that New Zealand viewers could not hear a reaction to the nation's landmark first goal and win from a local. Sky Sport hired Rosie White and Jason Pine as commentators for the remainder of New Zealand's games in response.

=== Morocco press conference ===
At a press conference before Morocco's opening match, a reporter from the BBC World Service asked captain Ghizlane Chebbak if any of her team's players were gay and how they were treated in Morocco, where all same-sex activity is illegal. Chebbak had already refused to answer a different journalist's question about player Nouhaila Benzina wearing a hijab. The moderator encouraged the World Service reporter to retract the question, but he responded that LGBTQ matters are not political and that his question was about players, pushing to ask it again; Chebbak did not answer and the conference was ended after the next question. Other journalists in the room criticised the reporter for, variously, asking something irrelevant and unnecessary; trying to out players; and asking Chebbak to make political comments that could put her at risk. One journalist explained that while it was natural to talk about "the intersection of politics and sports", it was important to do so without causing more harm to people affected by the politics. The BBC apologised and said that the reporter was inappropriate, with The Guardian reporting that "the matter was addressed by Fifa after the conclusion of the press conference."

When footage of the question, and Chebbak's uncomfortable reaction, was shared on social media, it provoked criticism for how journalists report on women's football; a popular channel for women's football content that shared the video added commentary saying that the question was based on the homophobic stereotype that female footballers are all lesbians, as no journalists asked similar questions of men's teams from homophobic nations during the 2022 Men's World Cup.

In various African countries, footballers accused of being lesbians have lost their jobs and homes. Anima Adjepong, a scholar in Queer African Studies, said that the question reflected a culture of focusing on female footballers' sexualities that, in Africa, was often used to cover up "everyday forms of workplace sexual harassment". Based on her cultural research and interviews with Ghanaian national team footballers, players who did not "give in" to sexual demands from coaches were accused of being lesbians; if players complained of harassment, they were accused of being lesbians and the complaints were not taken seriously, leading to fewer complaints. The coaches may also have sought to harm players who reported them by removing them from teams and spreading rumours of their sexuality in homophobic societies. Adjepong did call on the African football associations with a platform at the World Cup to "[champion] the rights of LGBTQ+ citizens" with an aim to create positive change in their countries.

=== Yamila Rodriguez tattoo ===
Argentina player Yamila Rodríguez has a leg tattoo of Portuguese men's player Cristiano Ronaldo, with images of it circulating on social media after she appeared in Argentina's opening match at the World Cup. Ronaldo had a long rivalry with Argentine legend Lionel Messi, with some Argentina fans thinking Rodríguez' tattoo was offensive and insulting to Messi, as well as disloyal, sentiments they posted widely on social media, drawing further attention. Rodríguez then posted to share that the "awful things" her nation's fans were saying about her were troubling her while she was trying to represent them, also noting that she has a tattoo of an Argentine player, Diego Maradona, as well.

=== Zambia press conference ===
Ahead of Zambia's second match, the press conference was cut short when the gathered media would not stop asking about the allegations of sexual misconduct against Zambia coach Bruce Mwape. The conference began with football questions until a Spanish journalist breached the subject, asking what image Zambia was giving to the world that they would keep someone accused of serious misconduct in such a visible role. The moderator requested the next question; the journalists in the room were displeased that it had been completely brushed aside and began to all ask variations on the same question, refactored to relate to football.

=== Australia press conferences ===
In the conference before Australia's second match, coach Tony Gustavsson faced questions about his training methods after two players sustained concussions during training in separate incidents; Gustavsson defended that "it was completely normal training". He had also selected a player still recovering from injury for the tournament, and was asked to defend this choice in light of the squad facing more injuries.

Gustavsson then faced criticism for his response to questions about Sam Kerr in the press conference before Australia's last group match. Kerr had been absent in earlier matches with a calf injury, with Gustavsson having said she would be assessed before the last group match. In the press conference, Mark Schwarzer asked if Kerr was fit and had been training, with Gustavsson first responding as if confused and then giving increasingly bizarre answers and laughing when Schwarzer continued to ask. Kerr had previously confirmed she had been training and would be available for the match, but would not give further details that their opposition, Canada, may be able to use to plan.

=== Spain press conference ===
After Spain's surprise loss to Japan, Spanish media suggested that besieged coach Vilda had lost any remaining supporters except for the RFEF. When Vilda spoke to the press after this match and in advance of their round of 16 tie, he was asked where the team needs to improve and any tactical reflections. Instead of answering, he put on a team scarf and said his team would play for love of Spain and football; noticing "negativity" among the journalists he then led a "let's go" chant. Vilda was twice asked about how the players felt going into the match and refused to answer; instead, player Olga Carmona, who was also in the conference, spoke about how the players would make positional improvements. Vilda was further criticised in the media for lack of tactical nous exhibited in front of the press.

=== Criticisms of the United States team ===
==== Carli Lloyd ====
Following the United States tie with Portugal, former U.S. player and commentator Carli Lloyd criticised the behavior of the team, stating that they were celebrating and partying with fans instead of showing a willingness to improve after their poor group stage performance and near elimination from the tournament. She stated that the goalpost was the player of the match since Ana Capeta's shot had missed and bounced off and then said that she wouldn't have put the United States in the top ten. However, she received backlash from fans, the media, former teammate Ali Krieger and coach Vlatko Andonovski, with some stating that her criticisms were self centered and that the team still had the desire to win. However, some fans and other individuals like fellow former player and commentator Alexi Lalas agreed with her criticisms and stated that he shared her sentiments.

==== Jason Whitlock ====
During the tournament, conservative pundit and former American football player Jason Whitlock went on a lengthy rant on his podcast about Rapinoe specifically, and the United States team generally. Whitlock has disdained feminism and LGBTQ+ rights. He said that Rapinoe "hates America because she hates herself", among other insults, and that the team as a whole have no interest in sports or representing their nation, accusing them of treating the World Cup as a platform "to demonize their investors" and "to go viral and cash in on the feminism pimp game". He blamed this attitude on Rapinoe as a veteran of the squad and supposed toxic influence. He also criticised the team for being ungrateful to the United States and male sportsmen who had "diminished opportunities for boys and men" in order to help the women's team be successful.

==== Donald Trump ====
Following the U.S. team loss on penalties during the knockout stage against Sweden, former U.S. President Donald Trump posted on Truth Social that "many of our players were openly hostile to America - No other country behaved in such a manner, or even close. WOKE EQUALS FAILURE. Nice shot Megan, the USA is going to Hell!!! MAGA"

==== Others ====
Several conservative commentators applauded the fact that the U.S. team lost on penalties during the knockout stage against Sweden. Former Fox News personality Megyn Kelly said she was "thrilled they lost" and that "You don’t support America, I don’t support you." Anti-Islam activist Brigitte Gabriel had written before the tournament that "I love America and that’s why I am rooting against the woke U.S. Women’s National Soccer Team this year." The conservative Washington Examiner accused the team of being "far more concerned pushing a woke agenda regarding equal pay for female athletes and the rights of LGBT citizens than they have been with winning games."

=== Adam Boulton comments ===
British broadcaster Adam Boulton was discussing the World Cup on his podcast when he was told which teams had been knocked out and asked if the tournament was "serious" or "just a kind of random kick around", also belittling the players. A female presenter told him the players were professional athletes. The comments came to light when radio host Scott Bryan shared it, criticising Boulton's comments. Accusing Boulton of sexism, Bryan's listeners then shared the clip with their criticisms of Boulton on social media.
