= Laone Moloi =

Motswana footballer (born 2000)

Personal information
- Full name: Laone Phenyoyaone Moloi
- Date of birth: 26 November 2000 (age 25)
- Place of birth: Botswana
- Height: 1.50 m (4 ft 11 in)
- Position: Midfielder

Team information
- Current team: Gaborone United Ladies
- Number: 10

Senior career*
Years	Team	Apps	(Gls)
2021–2023	Double Action Ladies		
2023	Security Systems Ladies		
2024–	Gaborone United Ladies	+10	(+2)

International career
2022–	Botswana	8	(2)
- * Club domestic league appearances and goals

Laone Phenyoyaone Moloi (born 26 November 2000) is a Motswana athlete and professional footballer who plays as a midfielder for Botswana Women's Championship club Gaborone United Ladies and the Botswana national team.

== Club career ==
While playing for Double Action Ladies, she made history in August 2021 by scoring the first-ever goal of the COSAFA Women's Champions League against Eswatini's Manzini Wanderers.

On 3 February 2023, it was announced that Lottah had joined Security Systems Ladies from Double Action Ladies.

On 25 January 2024, Gaborone United Ladies announced the signing of Moloi from Security Systems Ladies on a two-year contract. In August 2024, she took part in the 2024 COSAFA Women's Champions League, She scored in the final, leveling the match and sending it to penalties.

== International career ==
On 2 May 2022, she made her debut for the team, entering as a substitute in the 80th minute for Lone Gaofetoge during a 1–1 friendly draw against Zambia. Months later, She got selected for Botswana's final squad for the 2022 Women's Africa Cup of Nations. On 6 April 2024, She scored her first goal for the Mares in a friendly against Lesotho.

== Football career statistics ==
Scores and results list Botswana's goal tally first, score column indicates score after each Moloi goal.

List of international goals scored by Laone Moloi
No.	Date	Venue	Opponent	Score	Result	Competition
1.	6 April 2024	Royal Aria Stadium, Tlokweng, Botswana	Lesotho	1–0	2–1	Friendly
2.	23 October 2024	Gelvandale Stadium, Gqeberha, South Africa	Malawi	1–1	1–1	2024 COSAFA Women's Championship
3.	28 November 2024	Saniat Rmel Stadium, Tétouan, Morocco	Morocco	1–3	1–3	Friendly
4.	1 December 2024	Tanger Stadium, Tanger, Morocco	Mali	1–0	1–0	Friendly
5.	28 May 2025	Lucas Moripe Stadium, Pretoria, South Africa	South Africa	2–3	2–3	Friendly

== Athletics personal bests ==
Event	Time	Date	Notes
400 meters	58.83	17 April 2021	
800 meters	2:14.14	20 February 2021	
1500 meters	4:46.95	13 May 2017	
3000 meters	10:17.75	12 December 2018	
