= 2024 CAF Women's Champions League COSAFA Qualifiers =

COSAFA Women's Champions League; Hollywoodbets COSAFA Women's Champions League (sponsored name)

Tournament details
- Host country: Malawi
- City: Blantyre
- Dates: 15–24 August 2024
- Teams: 8 (from 8 associations)
- Venue: 1 (in 1 host city)

Final positions
- Champions: University of the Western Cape
- Runners-up: Gaborone United Ladies

Tournament statistics
- Matches played: 15
- Goals scored: 39 (2.6 per match)
- Top scorer(s): (Eswatini) Siphilisiwe Ndlovu (South Africa) Bongeka Gamede (3 goals)
- Best player: (Botswana) Keitumetse Dithebe
- Best goalkeeper: (South Africa) Siphesihle Dlamini
- Fair play award: University of the Western Cape

The 2024 CAF Women's Champions League COSAFA Qualifiers is the 4th edition of the annual women's association football club championship organized by COSAFA for its nations. This edition will be held from August 15 to 24 in Blantyre, Malawi.

Mamelodi Sundowns entered the 2024 CAF Women’s Champions League as the defending champions, which meant they were already qualified for the tournament. As a result, they did not participate in the COSAFA Women’s Champions League to defend their regional title and were replaced by the University of the Western Cape. The University of the Western Cape defeated Gaborone United 9–8 via penalties in the final.

== Participating clubs ==
The following four teams contested in the qualifying tournament.

Team	Appearances	Previous best performance
(Zambia) Green Buffaloes	4th	Champions (2022)
(Namibia) Ongos SC	2nd	Group stage (2021)
(Botswana) Gaborone United	1st	Debut
(South Africa) University of the Western Cape	1st	Debut
(Zimbabwe) Herentals Queens	1st	Debut
(Mozambique) União Desportiva de Lichinga	1st	Debut
(Malawi) Ascent Soccer Academy	1st	Debut
(Eswatini) Young Buffaloes	3rd	Group stage (2022, 2023)

== Venues ==
One stadium was shosen for the tournament.

Cities	Venues	Capacity
Chiwembe, Blantyre	Mpira Stadium	6,244

== Draw ==
The draw for this edition of the tournament was held on 24 July 2024 at 13:00 UTC+2 (13:00 CAT) in Egypt. The seven teams were drawn into 2 groups with teams finishing first and second in the groups qualifying for the knockout stages.

Seeded	Unseeded
(Malawi) Ascent Soccer Academy(hosts); (Zambia) Green Buffaloes	(Namibia) Ongos SC; (Botswana) Gaborone United; (South Africa) University of the Western Cape; (Zimbabwe) Herentals Queens; (Mozambique) União Desportiva de Lichinga; (Eswatini) Young Buffaloes

== Group stage ==
Tiebreakers

Teams are ranked according to points (3 points for a win, 1 point for a draw, 0 points for a loss), and if tied on points, the following tiebreaking criteria are applied, in the order given, to determine the rankings.

1. Points in head-to-head matches among tied teams;
2. Goal difference in head-to-head matches among tied teams;
3. Goals scored in head-to-head matches among tied teams;
4. If more than two teams are tied, and after applying all head-to-head criteria above, a subset of teams are still tied, all head-to-head criteria above are reapplied exclusively to this subset of teams;
5. Goal difference in all group matches;
6. Goals scored in all group matches;
7. Penalty shoot-out if only two teams are tied and they met in the last round of the group;
8. Disciplinary points (yellow card = 1 point, red card as a result of two yellow cards = 3 points, direct red card = 3 points, yellow card followed by direct red card = 4 points);
9. Drawing of lots.

=== Group A ===
Pos	Team	Pld	W	D	L	GF	GA	GD	Pts	Qualification	UWC	HRQ	FCO	GRB
1	(South Africa) UWC Ladies	3	2	0	1	5	2	+3	6	Semi-finals	—			0–1
2	(Zimbabwe) Herentals Queens	3	2	0	1	5	3	+2	6	Semi-finals	1–2	—	3–1	
3	(Namibia) Ongos SC	3	1	0	2	3	7	−4	3 (Note: Head-to-head points: FC Ongos 3, Green Buffaloes 0.)		0–3		—	
4	(Zambia) Green Buffaloes	3	1	0	2	2	3	−1	3			0–1	1–2	—

Source: cosafa
Notes:
15 August 2024
12:00 UTC+2

Herentals Queens (Zimbabwe)	3–1	(Namibia) Ongos SC
Mafuruse 20'; Tumbare 29'; Chikore 70'	Report	Kateta 90'

Mpira Stadium, Blantyre
15 August 2024
15:00 UTC+2

UWC Ladies (South Africa)	0–1	(Zambia) Green Buffaloes
	Report	Nanyangwe 76'

Mpira Stadium, Blantyre

17 August 2024
12:00 UTC+2

Green Buffaloes (Zambia)	0–1	(Zimbabwe) Herentals Queens
	Report	Mafuruse 60'

Mpira Stadium, Blantyre
17 August 2024
15:00 UTC+2

Ongos SC (Namibia)	0–3	(South Africa) UWC Ladies
	Report	Holweni 20' (pen.); Magama 31'; Gamede 56'

Mpira Stadium, Blantyre

19 August 2024
12:00 UTC+2

Green Buffaloes (Zambia)	1–2	(Namibia) Ongos SC
Chikupila 63'	Report	Uueziua 24'; Amukoto 39'

Mpira Stadium, Blantyre
19 August 2024
15:00 UTC+2

Herentals Queens (Zimbabwe)	1–2	(South Africa) UWC Ladies
Moyo 81'	Report	Cesane 46'; Gamede 61'

Mpira Stadium, Blantyre

=== Group B ===
Pos	Team	Pld	W	D	L	GF	GA	GD	Pts	Qualification	GBU	YBU	UDL	ASA
1	(Botswana) Gaborone United	3	1	2	0	4	3	+1	5	Semi-finals	—	1–1	0–0	3–2
2	(Eswatini) Young Buffaloes	3	1	1	1	6	3	+3	4	Semi-finals		—	4–0	1–2
3	(Mozambique) União Desportiva de Lichinga	3	1	1	1	1	4	−3	4				—	1–0
4	(Malawi) Ascent Soccer Academy (H)	3	1	0	2	4	5	−1	3					—

Source: COSAFA
(H) Hosts
16 August 2024
12:00 UTC+2

Gaborone United (Botswana)	0–0	(Mozambique) UD Lichinga
	Report

Mpira Stadium, Blantyre
16 August 2024
15:00 UTC+2

Ascent Soccer Academy (Malawi)	2–1	(Eswatini) Young Buffaloes
Chinzimu 2'; Chimbeta 45'	Report	Ngcamphalala 12'

Mpira Stadium, Blantyre
Referee: Nonjabulo Nonhle Ndlela (South Africa)

18 August 2024
12:00 UTC+2

Gaborone United (Botswana)	1–1	(Eswatini) Young Buffaloes
Modise 76'	Report	Ngcamphalala 23'

Mpira Stadium, Blantyre
Referee: Cacilda Francisco Fernando (Mozambique)
18 August 2024
15:00 UTC+2

UD Lichinga (Mozambique)	1–0	(Malawi) Ascent Soccer Academy
Miguel 74'	Report

Mpira Stadium, Blantyre
Referee: Chipo Mercy Mayimbo (Zimbabwe)

20 August 2024
12:00 UTC+2

Young Buffaloes (Eswatini)	4–0	(Mozambique) UD Lichinga
Ndlovu 8', 85', 90+1'; Nkambule 12'	Report

Mpira Stadium, Blantyre
Referee: Nonjabulo Nonhle Ndlela (South Africa)
20 August 2024
15:00 UTC+2

Gaborone United (Botswana)	3–2	(Malawi) Ascent Soccer Academy
Dithebe 18'; Maponga 48'; Moloi 76'	Report	Chinzimu 6'; Chimbeta 30'

Mpira Stadium, Blantyre
Referee: Gloria Sambumba (Zambia)

== Knockout stage ==
- In the knockout stage, extra-time and a penalty shoot-out will be used to decide the winner if necessary.

=== Bracket ===
Semi-finals
22 August – Blantyre
(South Africa) UWC Ladies	6
(Eswatini) Young Buffaloes	0
22 August – Blantyre
(Botswana) Gaborone United	1
(Zimbabwe) Herentals Queens	0

Final
24 August – Blantyre
(South Africa) UWC Ladies (p)	1 (9)
(Botswana) Gaborone United	1 (8)

=== Semi-finals ===
22 August 2024
12:00 UTC+2

Gaborone United (Botswana)	1–0	(Zimbabwe) Herentals Queens
Modise 82'	Report

Mpira Stadium, Blantyre
Referee: Vistoria Shangula (Namibia)
22 August 2024
15:00 UTC+2

UWC Ladies (South Africa)	6–0	(Eswatini) Young Buffaloes
Manengela 10' (pen.); Gamede 26'; Ndlovu 61'; Kortjie 74'; Mamabolo 78'; Holweni 90' (pen.)	Report

Mpira Stadium, Blantyre
Referee: Chipo Mayimbo Mercy (Zimbabwe)

=== Final ===
24 August 2024
15:00 UTC+2

UWC Ladies (South Africa)	1–1 (a.e.t.)	(Botswana) Gaborone United
Cesane 71'		Moloi 79'
Penalties
Maponya (penalty scored); Gamede (penalty scored); Cesane (penalty scored); Kortjie (penalty scored); Ndlovu (penalty scored); Dlamini (penalty scored); Magama (penalty scored); Mhlongo (penalty scored); Mhlakaza (penalty scored)	9–8	(penalty scored) Mochawe; (penalty scored) Modise; (penalty scored) Dithebe; (penalty scored) Moloi; (penalty scored) Ontlametse; (penalty scored) Busang; (penalty scored) Baeletsi; (penalty scored) Maponga; (penalty missed) Tlamma

Mpira Stadium, Blantyre
Referee: Nteboheleng Theresia Setoko (Lesotho)

== Awards and statistics ==
=== Goal scorers ===
There have been 39 goals scored in 15 matches, for an average of 2.6 goals per match (as of 23 August 2024).

Rank	Player	Team	Goals
1	(Eswatini) Siphilisiwe Ndlovu	(Eswatini) Young Buffaloes	3
1	(South Africa) Bongeka Gamede	(South Africa) UWC Ladies	3
2	(Eswatini) Tenanile Ngcamphalala	(Eswatini) Young Buffaloes	2
2	(Zimbabwe) Maudy Mafuruse	(Zimbabwe) Herentals Queens	2
2	(Malawi) Alephar Chimbeta	(Malawi) Ascent Soccer Academy	2
2	(Malawi) Faith Chinzimu	(Malawi) Ascent Soccer Academy	2
2	(Botswana) Yaone Modise	(Botswana) Gaborone United	2
2	(Botswana) Laone Moloi	(Botswana) Gaborone United	2
2	(South Africa) Sibulele Holweni	(South Africa) UWC Ladies	2
2	(South Africa) Noxolo Cesane	(South Africa) UWC Ladies	2
8	(Zambia) Natasha Nanyangwe	(Zambia) Green Buffaloes	1
8	(Malawi) Vanessa Chikupila	(Zambia) Green Buffaloes	1
8	(Namibia) Twelikondjela Amukoto	(Namibia) Ongos SC	1
8	(Namibia) Beverly Uueziua	(Namibia) Ongos SC	1
8	(Namibia) Ndapewa Kateta	(Namibia) Ongos SC	1
8	(Zimbabwe) Alice Moyo	(Zimbabwe) Herentals Queens	1
8	(Zimbabwe) Melody Chikore	(Zimbabwe) Herentals Queens	1
8	(Zimbabwe) Egness Tumbare	(Zimbabwe) Herentals Queens	1
8	(Botswana) Maungo Maponga	(Botswana) Gaborone United	1
8	(Botswana) Keitumetse Dithebe	(Botswana) Gaborone United	1
8	(Eswatini) Celiwe Nkambule	(Eswatini) Young Buffaloes	1
8	(Mozambique) Célia Miguel	(Mozambique) União Desportiva de Lichinga	1
8	(South Africa) Fikile Magama	(South Africa) UWC Ladies	1
8	(South Africa) Nondumiso Manengela	(South Africa) UWC Ladies	1
8	(South Africa) Ntombifikile Ndlovu	(South Africa) UWC Ladies	1
8	(South Africa) Tiffany Kortjie	(South Africa) UWC Ladies	1
8	(South Africa) Koketso Mamabolo	(South Africa) UWC Ladies	1

=== Group Stage Best XI ===
Goalkeepers	Defenders	Midfielders	Forwards
Group Stage Best XI
(South Africa) Siphesihle Dlamini	(South Africa) Bongeka Gamede (Zimbabwe) Tumbare Egness (South Africa) Fikile Magama (Zimbabwe) Alice Moyo	(South Africa) Amogelang Motau (Botswana) Keitumetse Dithebe (South Africa) Noxolo Cesane	(Eswatini) Tenanile Ngcamphalala (Malawi) Faith Chinzimu (Eswatini) Siphilisiwe Ndlovu

Group Stage Best XI Coach: Thinasonke Mbuli

=== Overall Best XI ===
Goalkeepers	Defenders	Midfielders	Forwards
Overall Best XI
(South Africa) Siphesihle Dlamini	(South Africa) Bongeka Gamede (Botswana) Kesegofetse Mochawe (South Africa) Fikile Magama (Zimbabwe) Tumbare Egness (Zimbabwe) Alice Moyo	(Botswana) Keitumetse Dithebe (South Africa) Noxolo Cesane	(Eswatini) Tenanile Ngcamphalala (Botswana) Yaone Modise (Eswatini) Siphilisiwe Ndlovu

Overall Best XI Coach: Thinasonke Mbuli

=== Awards ===
The following awards were given at the conclusion of the tournament: the Golden Boot (top scorer), Player of the Tournament (best overall player) and Golden Glove (best goalkeeper).

Golden Boot
(Eswatini) Siphilisiwe Ndlovu	(South Africa) Bongeka Gamede
3 goals	3 goals
Player of the Tournament
(Botswana) Keitumetse Dithebe
Golden Glove
(South Africa) Siphesihle Dlamini
COSAFA WCL Fair Play Trophy
(South Africa) University of the Western Cape
