= Matshidiso Masebe =

South African soccer player

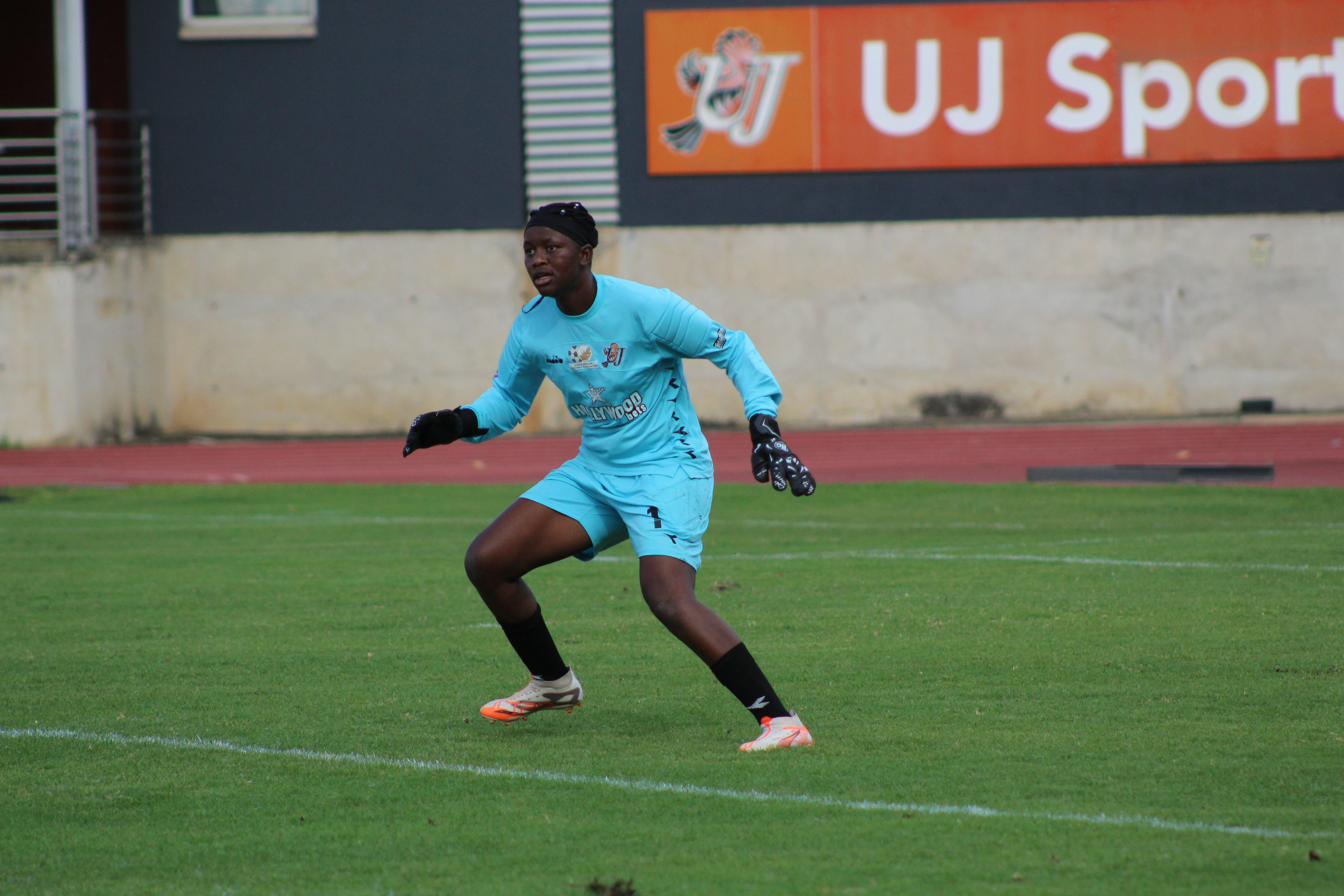
- Masebe in 2025

Personal information
- Full name: Matshidiso Lindiwe Masebe
- Date of birth: 29 September 2003 (age 23)
- Position: Goalkeeper

Team information
- Current team: University of Johannesburg
- Number: 16

College career
Years	Team	Apps	(Gls)
2022-	University of Johannesburg		

International career
2024-	South Africa		(0)
Medal record
Representing South Africa
COSAFA Women's Championship
Silver medal – second place	2024 South Africa

Matshidiso Lindiwe Masebe (born 29 September 2003) is a South African soccer player who plays as a goalkeeper for SAFA Women's League club UJ Ladies and the South Africa women's national team.

Masebe was named the goalkeeper of the season at the SAFA Women's League awards in 2024. She was joint goalkeeper of the tournament at the Women's Varsity Football tournament in 2023.

== College career ==
=== University of Johannesburg ===
Masebe plays for the University of Johannesburg. At the 2023 Women's Varsity Football she led the university to a second-place finish and was awarded the goalkeeper of the tournament with Siphesihle Dlamini from the University of the Western Cape.

She ended the 2024 SAFA Women's League with 14 clean sheets from 30 appearances and was named the goalkeeper of the season.

== International career ==
Masebe competed for the senior women's national team at the 2024 COSAFA Women's Championship where they finished as runners-up to Zambia. She made her debut in a 8-1 win over Seychelles coming in as a substitute for Jessica Williams in the 72nd minute.

== Honours ==
- COSAFA Women's Championship: runners-up: 2024
- Women's Varsity Football: runners-up: 2023

Individual

- 2024 SAFA Women's League: Goalkeeper of the Season
- 2023 Women's Varsity Football: Goalkeeper of the tournament
