= Siphesihle Dlamini =

South African soccer player

Personal information
- Date of birth: 2 May 2002 (age 24)
- Place of birth: Soweto, South Africa
- Position: Goalkeeper

Team information
- Current team: University of the Western Cape
- Number: 16

College career
Years	Team	Apps	(Gls)
2022-	University of the Western Cape		
Medal record
Representing South Africa
COSAFA Women's Champions League
Gold medal – first place	2024 Malawi

Siphesihle Dlamini (born 2 May 2002) is a South African soccer player who plays as a goalkeeper for SAFA Women's League club UWC Ladies.

== College career ==
Dlamini plays for the University of the Western Cape. At the 2023 Women's Varsity Football she led the university to their second title and was awarded the goalkeeper of the tournament with Matshidiso Masebe from the University of Johannesburg.

At the 2024 COSAFA Women's Champions League she helped her side become the first university to qualify for the CAF Women's Champions League when they defeated Gaborone United 9-8 via penalties. Dlamini had saved the last penalty and also converted the 6th penalty for the university. She was voted the goalkeeper for the tournament for her efforts.

Her side defended their Women's Varsity Football title in 2024.

== Honours ==
- COSAFA Women's Champions League: 2024
- Women's Varsity Football: 2023, 2024

Individual

- COSAFA Women's Champions League: Goalkeeper of the tournament: 2024
- Women's Varsity Football: Goalkeeper of the tournament: 2023
