= Sinoxolo Cesane =

South African soccer player

Personal information
- Date of birth: 11 October 2000 (age 26)
- Place of birth: Gugulethu, Western Cape, South Africa
- Height: 1.54 m (5 ft 1 in)
- Position: Midfielder

Team information
- Current team: Club Nacional de Football (women)

Youth career
- –: Cape Town Roses

College career
Years	Team	Apps	(Gls)
–2020	University of the Western Cape		
2020–2023	East Tennessee State Buccaneers	54	(9)

Senior career*
Years	Team	Apps	(Gls)
2024–2025	Mazatlán	55	(14)
2026–	Club Nacional de Football (women)		

International career
2023–	South Africa		
- * Club domestic league appearances and goals as of 23 August 2026

Sinoxolo Cesane (born 11 October 2000) is a South African soccer player who plays as a midfielder for Campeonato Uruguayo Femenino side Club Nacional de Football the South Africa women's national team.

== Personal life ==
She has an identical twin sister named Noxolo who is also a soccer player. She was born in Gugulethu.

== Playing career ==
Cesane played for the Chattanooga Lady Red Wolves of the American USL W League and the East Tennessee State Buccaneers women's soccer team.

=== Mazatlán ===
In January 2024, she signed for Liga MX Femenil side Mazatlán Femenil. On 16 January 2024, she scored a brace in the 2–1 win over Cruz Azul which ended the club's 31-match winless run in Liga MX Femenil.

=== Club Nacional de Football ===
In August 2026 she signed for Campeonato Uruguayo Femenino side Club Nacional de Football. Cesane scored four goals on debut and became the first African player in the Uruguayan women's league.

=== International career ===
In September 2023, she made a senior team debut in a 3–0 defeat to the USA.
