= University of KwaZulu-Natal Women's F.C. =

UKZN Ladies F.C.
- Full name: University of Kwa-Zulu Natal Women's Football Club
- Nickname: "Impi"
- Stadium: Howard College Stadium
- Coordinates: 29.867145 S 30.976453 E
- League: Sasol Women's League
- 2024: 8th Kwazulu Natal Stream A
- Website: ukzn.ac.za

The University of KwaZulu-Natal Women's Football Club, also known as UKZN Ladies F.C. or UKZN W.F.C, is the women's football club representing the University of Kwa-Zulu Natal based in Westville, Kwa-Zulu Natal. The senior team competes in the Sasol Women's League, the second tier women's football league in South Africa.

== History ==
In 2018, they made their Women's Varsity Football debut. In 2019, they made it to the tournaments quarter-finals going down 6-0 to UJ.

== Team management ==
The following manage the team:

Position	Staff
Football Coordinator	(South Africa) Khulekani Mabuza

== Notable players ==
=== FIFA World Cup participants ===
List of players that were called up for a FIFA Women's World Cup while playing for the university. In brackets, the tournament played:

- (South Africa) Kholosa Biyana (2019)
