= Thinasonke Mbuli =

South African soccer coach

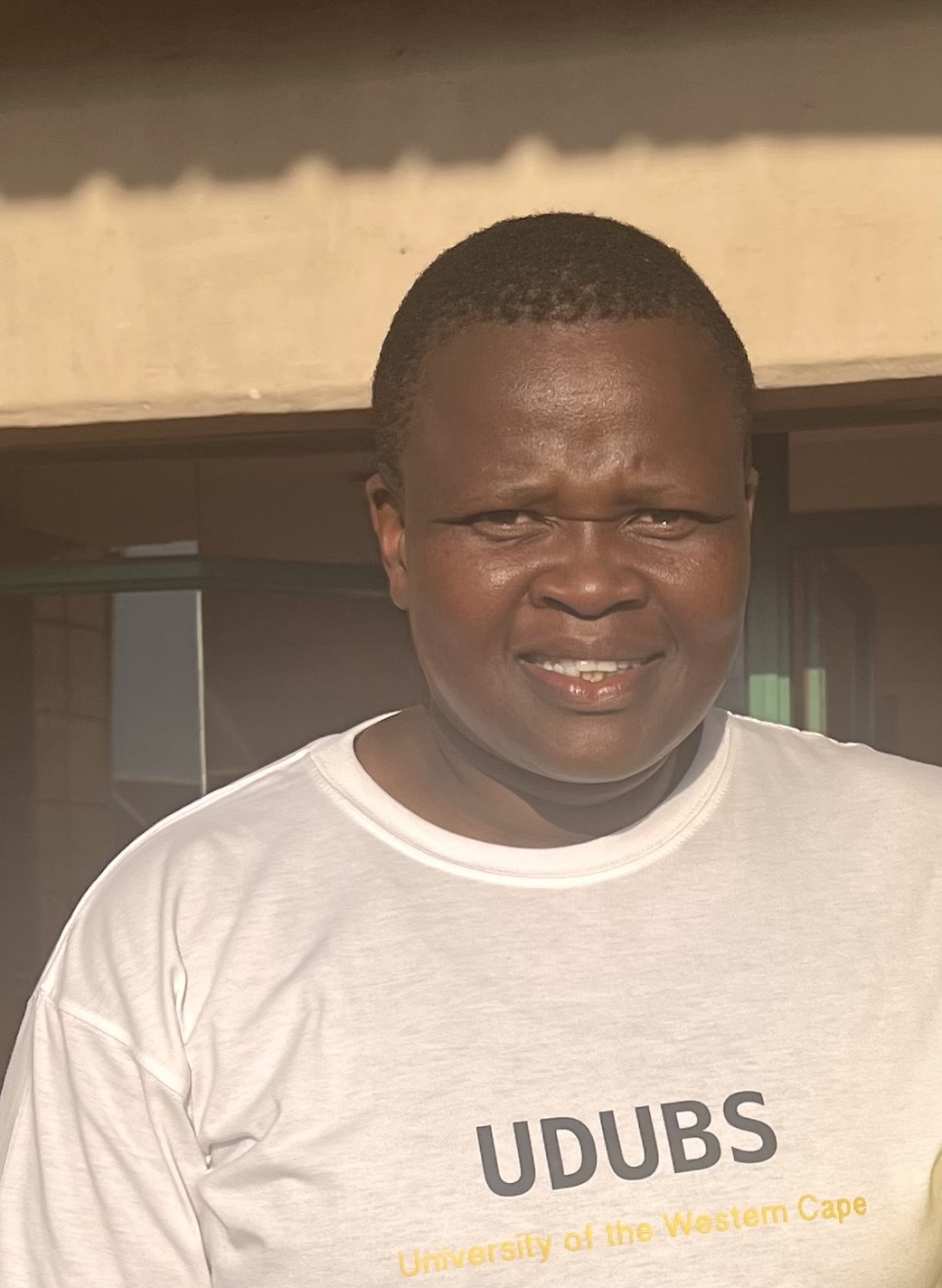
- Mbuli in 2024

Personal information
- Full name: Thinasonke Phakamile Jessica Mbuli
- Date of birth: 18 May

Team information
- Current team: University of the Western Cape (head coach)

Managerial career
- Years: Team
- 2019-: University of the Western Cape
Medal record
Representing South Africa
Women's Africa Cup of Nations
Second place	2018 Ghana
First place	2022 Morocco
COSAFA Women's Champions League
First place	2024 Malawi

Thinasonke Phakamile Jessica Mbuli is South African professional soccer manager and current head coach of SAFA Women's League side University of the Western Cape and the assistant coach of the South Africa women's national soccer team.

Mbuli become the first female South African coach, second overall, to qualify for the CAF Women's Champions League after winning the 2024 COSAFA Women's Champions League. She was nominated for the CAF Women's Coach of the Year award in 2024.

== Coaching career ==
In September 2017, Mbuli was appointed assistant coach of the South Africa women's national soccer team. She was part of the technical team when they won their maiden continental title at the 2022 Women's Africa Cup of Nations and were runner's up at the 2018 Women's Africa Cup of Nations. She was also part of the technical team when they won their first FIFA Women's World Cup match and qualified for their first ever knockout round in 2023.

=== University of the Western Cape ===
In 2019, she was appointed head coach of the University of the Western Cape. She led the team to runners-up position at the Women's Varsity Football with her team losing out to six time consecutive winners TUT Ladies.

In 2021, she led the team to their maiden Women's Varsity Football title.

In 2023, she was named the SAFA Women's League coach of the season Her team also won the 2023 Women's Varsity Football.

In 2024, she defended the Women's Varsity Football title by winning the 2024 Women's Varsity Football tournament. Her team were the first university to qualify for the COSAFA Women's Champions League due to finishing second in the 2023 SAFA Women's League. She won the 2024 COSAFA Women's Champions League with 3 wins, 1 draw (the final) and a single loss. This made her the second South African coach, and first female coach, after Jerry Tshabalala to qualify for the CAF Women's Champions League.

== Honours ==
Manager

- COSAFA Women's Champions League: 2024
- Women's Varsity Football: 2021, 2023, 2024

South Africa (assistant coach)

- Women's Africa Cup of Nations: 2022, runners-up: 2018

Individual

- 2023 SAFA Women's League: Coach of the Season
