= Antonia Maponya =

South African mariner and soccer player

Personal information
- Date of birth: 17 October 1999 (age 27)
- Position: Forward

Team information
- Current team: University of the Western Cape
- Number: 23

Senior career*
Years	Team	Apps	(Gls)
2018-	University of the Western Cape		

International career
- South Africa U-17
- South Africa U-20
2022-	South Africa		
- * Club domestic league appearances and goals

Antonia Maponya (born 17 October 1999) is a South African navy rating and soccer player who plays as a forward for SAFA Women's League club UWC Ladies and the South Africa women's national team.

== Personal life ==
Maponya graduated with a Bachelor of Arts in Business Administration with distinction from the University of the Western Cape in 2021. She holds the rank of Sub Lieutenant in the South African Navy.

== Club career ==
Maponya won the 2024 COSAFA Women's Champions League with the University of the Western Cape.

== International career ==
She made her international debut in a 3-0 loss to Zambia in 2022.

== Honours ==
- COSAFA Women's Champions League: 2024
