= Gaborone United Ladies S.C. =

Women's football club in Botswana

Gaborone United Ladies
- Full name: Gaborone United Ladies Sporting Club
- Nickname: "The Red Roses"
- Director: Nicolas Zakhem
- Head Coach: (Burundi) Khalid Niyonzima
- League: Botswana Women's Championship
- 2024-2025: 1st

Gaborone United Ladies S.C. is a women's professional soccer club based in Gaborone, Botswana. The team competes in the Botswana Women's Championship, the top tier women's football league in Botswana.

The team together with the men's team are owned by Nicolas Zakhem. They won the 2025 COSAFA Women's Champions League becoming the first team from Botswana to win the title.

== History ==
In 2022 they won the Gaborone Central Regional Football division 2 and were promoted to the Botswana Women's Championship.

They were runners up to Double Action Ladies in the 2023 Botswana Women's Championship season losing the final 1–0.

In 2024 they won their maiden Botswana Women's Championship title with a 8–1 win over Tawana Top Girls in the final. The win qualified them for the 2024 COSAFA Women's Champions League.

=== COSAFA Women's Champions League ===
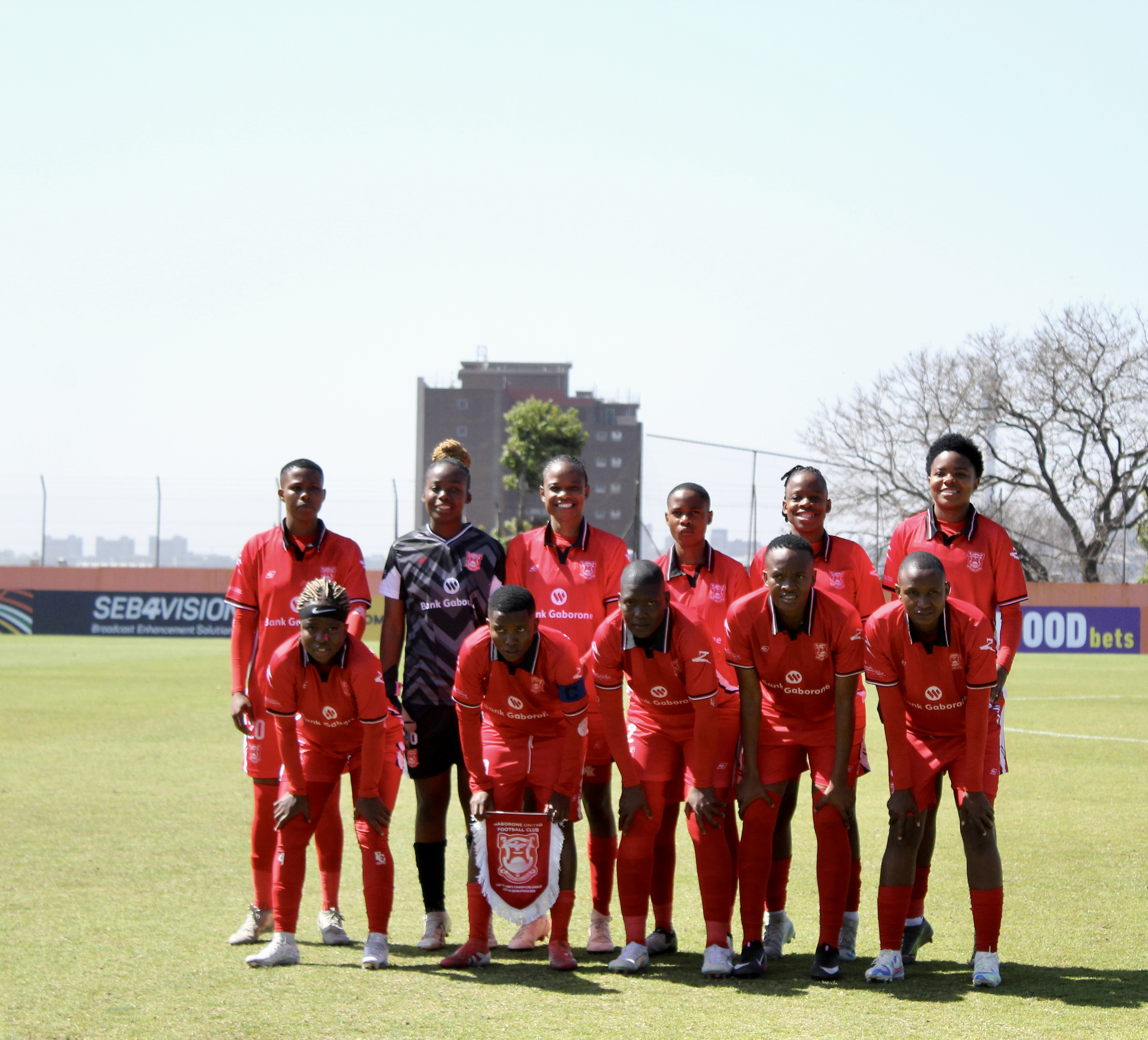
The Gaborone United XI at the 2025 CAF Women's Champions League COSAFA Qualifiers against Young Buffaloes

The team made their COSAFA Women's Champions League debut with a goalless draw against UD Lichinga from Mozambique. Their next match was a 1–1 draw with Young Buffaloes from Eswatini. They topped group B after a 3–2 win over host Ascent Soccer Academy from Malawi to qualify for the knockouts stages of the tournament. In the semi-finals they won 1–0 against Herentals Queens from Zimbabwe. They lost the final 9–8 via penalties against the University of the Western Cape from South Africa after the match ended in a 1–1 draw.

They started the 2025 COSAFA Women's Champions League with a 1–0 win against Young Buffaloes from Eswatini and set the COSAFA Women's Champions League record when they won 10–1 against Kick4Life from Lesotho to advance to the semifinals. In the semi-final they won 3–1 against CD Costa do Sol from Mozambique to set up their second successive final. They won their maiden title 4–3 via penalties after a 1–1 draw with ZESCO Ndola Girls from Zambia.

== Players ==
As of August 2025

Gaborone United Ladies F.C. squad for 2025 season.

Note: Flags indicate national team as defined under FIFA eligibility rules; some limited exceptions apply. Players may hold more than one non-FIFA nationality.

No.	Pos.	Nation	Player
1	GK	BOT	Tlamelo Pheresi
3	DF	BOT	Kesegofetse Mochawe
4	DF	BOT	Nancy Baeletsi
5	MF	BOT	Desiree Kenyaditswe
6	MF	BOT	Oteng Oganeditse Bonang
7	MF	BOT	Golebaone Selebatso
8	FW	BOT	Maungo Jessica Maponga
9	FW	BOT	Lone Gaofetoge
10	FW	BOT	Keitumetse Dithebe
11	FW	BOT	Amogelnag Samantha Sebotho
12	DF	BOT	Yaone Jessica Modise
13	DF	BOT	Gonayamodimo Macha

No.	Pos.	Nation	Player
15	MF	BOT	Thando Kefilwe Boitshepo
16	FW	BOT	Masa Keagakwa
17	MF	BOT	Tshepiso Marogwe
18	DF	BOT	Segakolodi Didukanyane
19	FW	BOT	Serati Modisenyane
20	DF	BOT	Palesa Laura Mokopakgosi
21	MF	BOT	Gaonyadiwe Ontlametse
22	MF	BOT	Botlhe Bagotsi
23	MF	BOT	Goitsemang Tlamma
24	MF	BOT	Obonetse Oratile Rathari
25	DF	BOT	Kefilwe Monty Tafa
26	GK	BOT	Boitshepho Michelle Mpone
27	FW	BOT	Lesego Radiakanyo

== Honours ==
- COSAFA Women's Champions League: 2025 ,Runners-Up: 2024
- Botswana Women's Championship: 2024, 2025, Runners-Up: 2023
- Gaborone Central Regional Football division 2: 2022

== Team Statistics ==
=== COSAFA Women's Champions League record ===
Season	Pos	Record						
Season	Pos	P	W	D	L	F	A	GD
2024	Runners-Up	5	2	2	1	5	2	3
2025	Champions	4	4	0	0	15	3	12
