= Botswana Women's Championship =

Highest division of league competition for Botswana women's football

- Founded: 1999; 27 years ago
- Country: Botswana
- Confederation: CAF
- Number of clubs: 20
- Level on pyramid: 1
- International cup(s): COSAFA Women's Champions League; CAF Women's Champions League
- Current champions: Gaborone United Ladies (3rd title) (2025–26)
- Most championships: Double Action Ladies (14 titles)
- Website: www.bfa.co.bw

The Botswana Women's Championship is the highest level of league competition for women's football in Botswana. It is the women's equivalent of the men's Botswana Premier League.

From the 2021 season the champion qualifies for the COSAFA Women's Champions League.

== History ==
After several years of inactivity, the competition was revived in 2021 with sponsorship from the Diamond Trading Company. In the 2021–22 season, Double Action Ladies secured the title by defeating the Mexican Girls 4–2 in the final.

During the 2022–23 season, Double Action Ladies retained the championship, recording a 1–0 victory over Gaborone United Ladies in the final.

In the 2023–24 season, Gaborone United Ladies claimed their first championship, achieving an emphatic 8–1 win over Tawana Top Girls in the final.

=== New league format: 2025–2026 ===
The BH National Women’s First Division League National Championship is contested using a two‑stream format, comprising the Northern Stream and Southern Stream. Each stream conducts its own league phase, with the respective stream winners advancing to the national final to determine the overall champion. The introduction of this format was supported by FIFA funding amounting to $289,000 (P4 million).

In the 2025–26 season, Gaborone United Ladies, champions of the Southern Stream, defeated the Northern Stream winners Orapa United 5–1 in the championship final to claim the national title.

== Champions ==
The list of champions and runners-up:

Year	Champions	Runners-up
1999	Double Action	
2000	Double Action	
2001	Double Action	
2002–2005	Not held	
2005–2006	Double Action	
2006–2007	Double Action	
2007–2008	Double Action	Untouchable
2008–2009	Double Action	Unknown
2009–2010	Double Action	Township Rollers
2010–2011	Double Action	Township Rollers
2011–2012	Double Action	Township Rollers
2012–2013	Double Action	Township Rollers
2013–2014	Double Action	Unknown
2014–2015	Township Rollers	Double Action
2015–2016	Township Rollers	Double Action
2017–2021	Not held	
2021–2022	Double Action	Mexican Girls
2022–2023	Double Action	Gaborone United
2023–2024	Gaborone United	Tawana Top Girls
2024–2025	Gaborone United	Double Action
2025–2026	Gaborone United	Orapa United
