= Sibulele Holweni =

South African soccer player (born 2001)

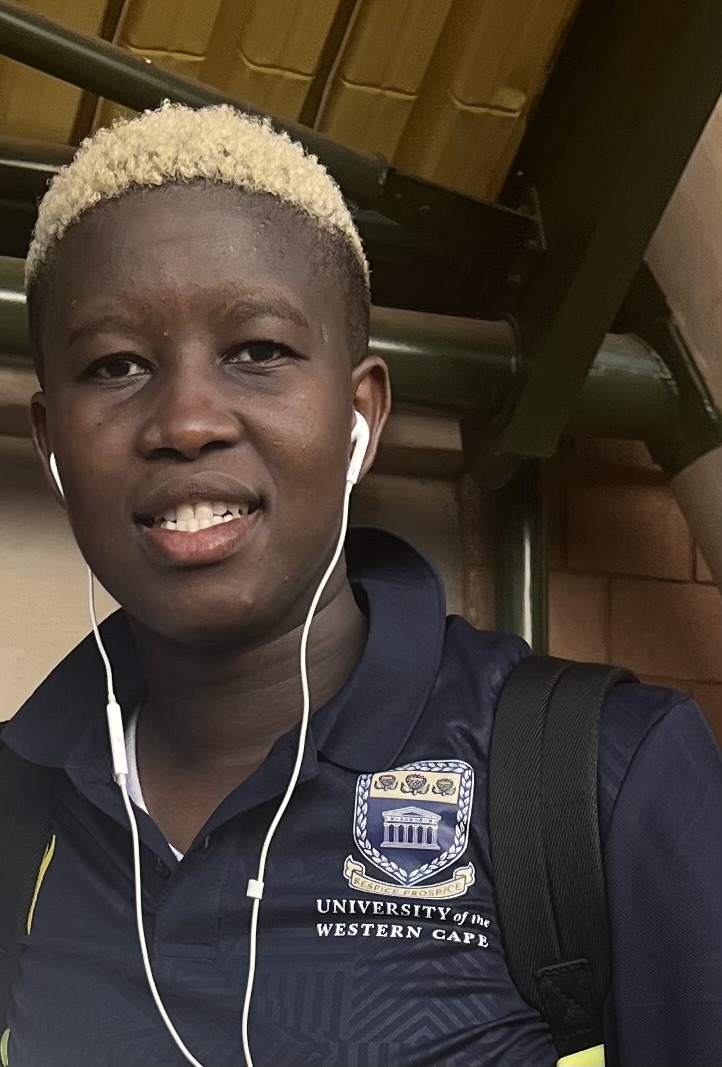
- Holweni in 2024

Personal information
- Full name: Sibulele Cecilia Holweni
- Date of birth: 28 April 2001 (age 25)
- Place of birth: Ibhayi, South Africa
- Height: 1.58 m (5 ft 2 in)
- Position: Midfielder

Team information
- Current team: Nordsjælland

Youth career
- –: Sophakama Ladies
- –2015: High Performace Centre

College career
Years	Team	Apps	(Gls)
2021–2026	UWC		

Senior career*
Years	Team	Apps	(Gls)
2026–	Nordsjælland		

International career^{‡}
2018	South Africa U17	3	(0)
2019–	South Africa	21	(16)
Medal record
Representing South Africa
Women's Africa Cup of Nations
First place	2022 Morocco
COSAFA Women's Champions League
Gold medal – first place	2024 Malawi
- * Club domestic league appearances and goals ‡ National team caps and goals as of 18 February 2022

Sibulele Cecilia Holweni (born 28 April 2001) is a South African soccer player who plays as a midfielder for Nordsjælland and the South African national team. She was part of the national team that won the maiden continental title at the 2022 Women's Africa Cup of Nations.

== Playing career ==
Holweni played for Sophakama Ladies in the Eastern Cape Women's Provincial League where she was scouted to move to the High Performance Centre at Tuks and eventually moved to the University of the Western Cape. She won the COSAFA Women's Champions League with UWC in 2024 and appeared at the 2024 CAF Women's Champions League where the team finished in 5th position overall.

Holweni signed with Danish A-Liga club Nordsjælland in October 2026.

== International career ==
Holweni made her senior debut on 12 May 2019 in a 0–3 friendly loss to the United States. On 9 November 2020, Holweni scored five goals in the team's 7–0 win over Comoros in Group A of the 2020 COSAFA Women's Championship. South Africa finished at the top of their group and advanced to the knockout stage. They won the championship and Holweni was named top goal scorer with 8 goals.

She competed for the national team when they won their maiden continental title at the 2022 Women's Africa Cup of Nations.

== Honours ==
University of the Western Cape

- COSAFA Women's Champions League: 2024

South Africa

- Women's Africa Cup of Nations: 2022
- COSAFA Women's Championship: 2020

Individual

- COSAFA Women's Championship: 2020 Top Goal Scorer

== International goals ==
Scores and results lis South Africa's goals tally first.

No.	Date	Venue	Opponent	Score	Result	Competition
1.	6 November 2020	Wolfson Stadium, Ibhayi, South Africa	Eswatini	2–0	5–0	2020 COSAFA Women's Championship
2.	9 November 2020	Wolfson Stadium, Ibhayi, South Africa	Comoros	1–0	7–0	2020 COSAFA Women's Championship
3.	9 November 2020	Wolfson Stadium, Ibhayi, South Africa	Comoros	2–0	7–0	2020 COSAFA Women's Championship
4.	9 November 2020	Wolfson Stadium, Ibhayi, South Africa	Comoros	5–0	7–0	2020 COSAFA Women's Championship
5.	9 November 2020	Wolfson Stadium, Ibhayi, South Africa	Comoros	6–0	7–0	2020 COSAFA Women's Championship
6.	9 November 2020	Wolfson Stadium, Ibhayi, South Africa	Comoros	7–0	7–0	2020 COSAFA Women's Championship
7.	12 November 2020	Wolfson Stadium, Ibhayi, South Africa	Malawi	5–1	6–2	2020 COSAFA Women's Championship
8.	14 November 2020	Wolfson Stadium, Ibhayi, South Africa	Botswana	1–0	2–1	2020 COSAFA Women's Championship
9.	13 April 2021	Onikan Stadium, Lagos, Nigeria	Ghana	1–0	3–0	Aisha Buhari Cup
10.	4 October 2021	Wolfson Stadium, Ibhayi, South Africa	Mozambique	1–0	3–1	2021 COSAFA Women's Championship
11.	4 October 2021	Wolfson Stadium, Ibhayi, South Africa	Mozambique	3–1	3–1	2021 COSAFA Women's Championship
12.	7 October 2021	Wolfson Stadium, Ibhayi, South Africa	Malawi	1–1	2–3	2021 COSAFA Women's Championship
13.	7 October 2021	Wolfson Stadium, Ibhayi, South Africa	Malawi	2–2	2–3	2021 COSAFA Women's Championship
14.	9 October 2021	Wolfson Stadium, Ibhayi, South Africa	Zambia	1–1	1–1 (3–4 p)	2021 COSAFA Women's Championship
15.	26 October 2021	Orlando Stadium, Johannesburg, South Africa	Mozambique	6–0	6–0	2022 Women's Africa Cup of Nations qualification
16.	18 February 2026	Old Peter Mokaba Stadium, Polokwane, South Africa	Malawi	1–0	2–0	2025 COSAFA Women's Championship
