= Bongeka Gamede =

South African soccer player (born 1999)

Personal information
- Full name: Bongeka S'mangele Gamede
- Date of birth: 22 May 1999 (age 27)
- Place of birth: Ixopo, South Africa
- Height: 1.59 m (5 ft 3 in)
- Position: Defender

Team information
- Current team: Nordsjælland
- Number: 4

College career
Years	Team	Apps	(Gls)
2017–2024	Western Cape U		

Senior career*
Years	Team	Apps	(Gls)
2024–	FC Nordsjælland		

International career^{‡}
- South Africa U17
- South Africa U20
2019–	South Africa	30	(0)
Medal record
Representing South Africa
Women's Africa Cup of Nations
First place	2022 Morocco
COSAFA Women's Champions League
Gold medal – first place	2024 Malawi
- * Club domestic league appearances and goals ‡ National team caps and goals as of 20 July 2023 (prior the 2023 FIFA Women's World Cup)

Bongeka S'mangele Gamede (born 22 May 1999) is a South African soccer player who plays as a defender for Danish A-Liga club FC Nordsjælland and the South Africa women's national team.

Gamede was part of the national team when they won their maiden continental title at the 2022 Women's Africa Cup of Nations.

Gamede was part of the University of the Western Cape team when they became the first university to win the COSAFA Women's Champions League and qualify for the CAF Champions League. She was tied for top goal scorer at the tournament and made it to the Group Stage Best XI as well as the overall Best XI.

== Personal life ==
Gamede's home town is Ixopo in KwaZulu-Natal. In 2024 she graduated from the University of the Western Cape with a Bachelor of Arts in Tourism.

== College career ==
=== University of Western Cape ===
Gamede played for the university while undergoing her studies in Tourism.

In 2023 she was named 2023 Sportswoman of the Year Winner at the university.

She scored 3 goals in the 2024 COSAFA Women's Champions League to help the side win their maiden title and qualify for the CAF Women's Champions League. She named in the 2024 COSAFA Women's Champions League Best XI.

== Club career ==
=== FC Nordsjælland ===
She signed for Danish A-Liga club FC Nordsjælland in 2024.

== International career ==
A former South African under-17 and under-20 international, she was included in the South African squad for the 2019 FIFA Women's World Cup despite having never previously represented the national team at senior level. A tourism student at the University of the Western Cape, she had to postpone her first year exams to appear at the tournament. She made her international debut in a pre-World Cup friendly against Norway on 2 June 2019, coming on as a substitute in South Africa's 7–2 defeat.

== Honours ==
- Women's Africa Cup of Nations: 2022, runner-up: 2018
- COSAFA Women's Champions League: 2024

Individual

- University of the Western Cape Sportswoman of the Year Winner: 2023
- COSAFA Women's Champions League: 2024 Top goal scorer (tied 3 goals)
