= Noxolo Cesane =

South African soccer player (born 2000)

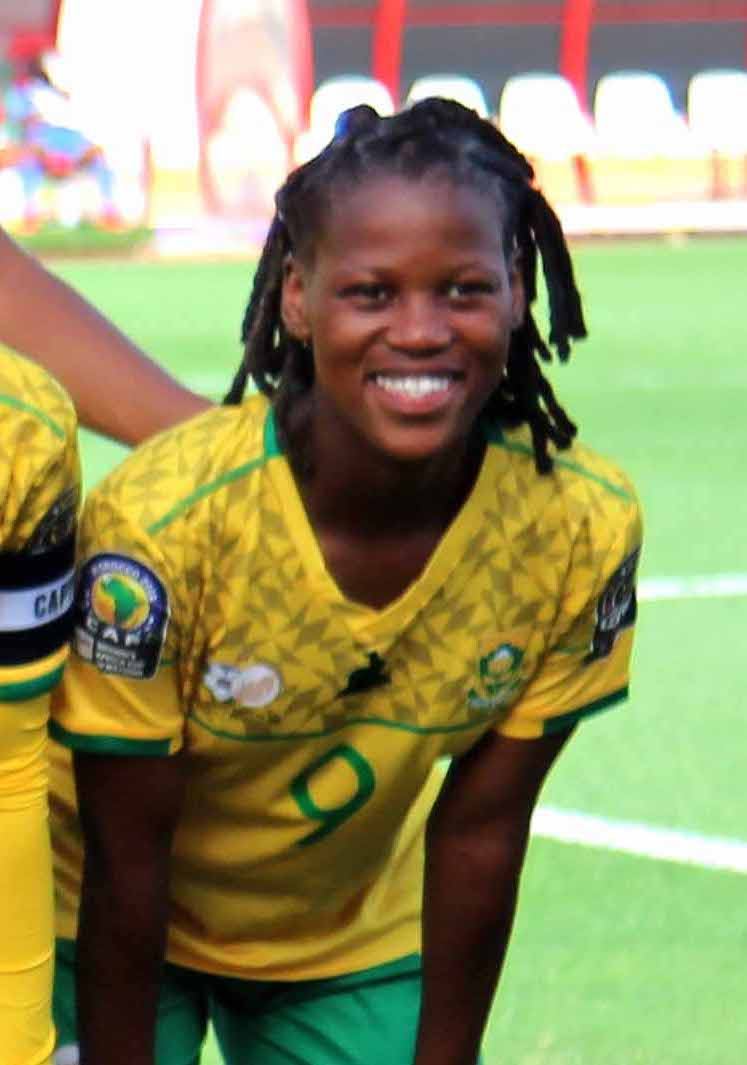
- Cesane with South Africa

Personal information
- Date of birth: 11 October 2000 (age 26)
- Place of birth: Guguletu, Cape Town, South Africa
- Height: 1.73 m (5 ft 8 in)
- Position: Midfielder

Team information
- Current team: Mamelodi Sundowns Ladies

Youth career
- 2012–2018: Cape Town Roses

College career
Years	Team	Apps	(Gls)
2018–2022	University of the Western Cape		

Senior career*
Years	Team	Apps	(Gls)
2022	Stade de Reims	7	(0)
2023	Tigres UANL	6	(0)
2023–2024	University of the Western Cape		
2024	Eastern Flames		
2025–	Mamelodi Sundowns Ladies		

International career^{‡}
2019–	South Africa	40	(4)
Medal record
Women's Africa Cup of Nations
Gold medal – first place	2022 Morocco	Team
COSAFA Women's Champions League
Gold medal – first place	2024 Malawi
- * Club domestic league appearances and goals as of 6 June 2023 ‡ National team caps and goals as of 20 July 2023 (prior the 2023 FIFA Women's World Cup)

Noxolo Cesane (born 11 October 2000) is a South African soccer player who plays as a midfielder for SAFA Women's League club Mamelodi Sundowns Ladies and the South Africa women's national team.

She was part of the national team when they won their maiden continental title at the 2022 Women's Africa Cup of Nations. Cesane was part of the University of the Western Cape team when they became the first university to win the COSAFA Women's Champions League and qualify for the CAF Women's Champions League. She was selected in the tournament Best XI.

== Personal life ==
Cesane has a twin sister, Sinoxolo Cesane.

== Early life ==
Cesane was born in 2000 in Cape Town, South Africa, and grew up in Gugulethu. Cesane grew up playing football with boys before joining girls' club Cape Town Roses with her twin sister Sinoxolo, both rising to the club's senior team by age 12.

== College career ==
Cesane spent four years at the University of the Western Cape, where she played in the SAFA Women's League.

== Club career ==
=== Stade de Reims ===
After participating in the 2022 Women's Africa Cup of Nations, Cesane drew interest from French club Stade de Reims. In September 2022, she signed a one-year contract with the club to play in France's top-flight Division 1 Féminine.

=== Tigres UNAL ===
In February 2023, seeking more playing time, she signed for Liga MX Femenil side Tigres.

=== University of the Western Cape ===
In August 2024 she was part of the team that won the 2024 COSAFA Women's Champions League. Cesane was selected for the Group Stage Best XI as well as the overall tournament Best XI.

=== Eastern Flames ===
In September 2024, she signed for Saudi Women's Premier League side Eastern Flames.

== International career ==
In 2019, Cesane played her first match for the South Africa women's national soccer team. Cesane was part of the South African team that won the 2022 Women's Africa Cup of Nations.

=== International goals ===
No.	Date	Venue	Opponent	Score	Result	Competition
1.	5 August 2019	Wolfson Stadium, KwaZakele, South Africa	Madagascar	2–1	3–1	2019 COSAFA Women's Championship
2.	28 September 2021	Wolfson Stadium, KwaZakele, South Africa	Malawi	2–0	2–1	2021 COSAFA Women's Championship
3.	20 October 2021	Estádio do Zimpeto, Maputo, Mozambique	Mozambique	6–0	7–0	2022 Women's Africa Cup of Nations qualification
4.	18 February 2023	Miracle Sport Complex, Alanya, Turkey	Uzbekistan	3–0	3–0	2023 Turkish Women's Cup
5.	4 June 2024	Stade Lat-Dior, Thiès, Senegal	Senegal	2–0	2–0	Friendly
6.	2 December 2025	Adrar Stadium, Agadir, Morocco	Morocco	2–0	2–0	Friendly

== Style of play ==
Cesane mainly operates as a midfielder and is known for her skill.

== Honours ==
University of the Western Cape

COSAFA Women's Champions League: 2024

South Africa

- Women's Africa Cup of Nations: 2022
