= Moulay Rachid Stadium =

- ملعب مولاي رشيد
- Interactive map of Moulay Rachid Stadium
- Location: Laayoune
- Coordinates: 27°08′46″N 13°11′30″W
- Capacity: 5,000
- Type: Multi-use stadium

Tenant
- JS Massira

Moulay Rachid Stadium (ملعب مولاي رشيد) is a multi-use stadium located in Laayoune, Moroccan-occupied Western Sahara. It is used mostly for football matches. The stadium has a capacity of 5,000 people and is home the JS Massira football club of Laayoune.
