= Fikile Magama =

South African professional soccer player

Personal information
- Full name: Fikile Venessa Magama
- Date of birth: 19 January 2002 (age 24)
- Height: 1.55 m (5 ft 1 in)
- Position: Defender

Team information
- Current team: UWC

Senior career*
Years	Team	Apps	(Gls)
- UWC

International career
	South Africa	8	(0)
- * Club domestic league appearances and goals

Fikile Venessa Magama (born 19 January 2002) is a South African professional soccer player who plays as a defender for SAFA Women's League side UWC Ladies and the South Africa women's national team.

== International career ==
She was part of the Basetsana team at the inaugural COSAFA U-20 Women's Championship held in 2019 when they won a bronze medal.

Magama competed for the South Africa women's national soccer team at the 2023 FIFA Women's World Cup where they reached the Round of 16.

== Honours ==
South Africa

- COSAFA U-20 Women's Championship: third-place:2019
