= South Africa women's national soccer team =

Women's national association football team representing South Africa

South Africa
- Nickname: Banyana Banyana
- Association: South African Football Association
- Confederation: CAF (Africa)
- Sub-confederation: COSAFA (Southern Africa)
- Head coach: Desiree Ellis
- Captain: Refiloe Jane
- Most caps: Janine Van Wyk (185)
- Top scorer: Portia Modise (101)
- FIFA code: RSA
First colours	Second colours

FIFA ranking
- Current: 57 ▲1 (16 June 2026)
- Highest: 45 (August 2023)
- Lowest: 74 (June – September 2005; December 2007)

First international
- South Africa 9–0 Swaziland (Johannesburg, South Africa; 30 May 1993)

Biggest win
- South Africa 17–0 Comoros (Port Elizabeth, South Africa; 31 July 2019)

Biggest defeat
- China 13–0 South Africa (Dalian, China; 7 September 2003)

World Cup
- Appearances: 2 (first in 2019)
- Best result: Round of 16 (2023)

Africa Women Cup of Nations
- Appearances: 13 (first in 1995)
- Best result: (gold) Champions (2022)

Summer Olympics
- Appearances: 2 (first in 2012)
- Best result: 10th (2012)

COSAFA Women's Championship
- Appearances: 10 (first in 2002)
- Best result: (gold) Champions (2002, 2006, 2017, 2018, 2019, 2020)
Medal record
Women's Africa Cup of Nations
First place	2022 Morocco
Second place	2018 Ghana
Second place	2012 Equatorial Guinea
Second place	2008 Equatorial Guinea
Second place	2000 South Africa
Third place	2006 Nigeria
Third place	2010 South Africa
COSAFA Women's Championship
Gold medal – first place	2002 Zimbabwe
Gold medal – first place	2006 Zambia
Gold medal – first place	2017 Zimbabwe
Gold medal – first place	2018 South Africa
Gold medal – first place	2019 South Africa
Gold medal – first place	2020 South Africa
Silver medal – second place	2011 Zimbabwe
Silver medal – second place	2022 South Africa
- Website: https://www.safa.net/

The South Africa women's national football team represents South Africa in women's international soccer and is run by the South African Football Association, the governing body for Soccer in South Africa. Nicknamed Banyana Banyana (The Girls in Sesotho, officially known as Sasol Banyana Banyana for sponsorship reasons).

South Africa competed in two Olympic Games, two FIFA Women's World Cups, and 14 Women's African Cup of Nations, where they were runners up five times before winning once. They also competed at all 10 COSAFA Women's Championships, where they won seven times, came second thrice and finished in fourth place once.

== History ==
Banyana Banyana's first official match was held on 30 May 1993 against Eswatini, which they won 14–0. Future Women's AFCON winning coach Desiree Ellis played in that game and scored three of the goals

Their first international match outside of Africa was against China. They played two matches which they lost 8–0 and 13–0 with the latter being the heaviest defeat in their history. The team's first victory over a nation outside of Africa was in 2000, where they beat Scotland by 2–0. This was at the Cyrus Women's Cup.

South Africa's biggest win came in a COSAFA Women's Championship match in Gqeberha on 31 July 2019, when they beat the Comoros 17–0. Captain Refiloe Jane scored 4 of the goals.

=== Olympic Games ===
They qualified for Olympic football for the first time in 2012, with coach Joseph Mkhonza. Their second Olympic participation was at 2016's Rio Olympics, under coach Vera Pauw.

=== Women's Africa Cup of Nations ===
Banyana appeared in 14 CAF Women's Championships (Now known as Women's AFCON) and were runners up on five occasions (1995, 2000, 2008, 2012 and 2018) and third at two events (2006 and 2010), before eventually winning their first Women's Africa Cup of Nations in 2022, beating Morocco 2–1 in the final.

=== FIFA Women's World Cup ===
Coached by Desiree Ellis, they qualified for their first FIFA Women's World Cup in 2019, in Group B with Germany, Spain and China. However, they lost all matches, and their only goal was against Spain when they went to a 1–0 lead only to lose 3–1.

South Africa qualified for the FIFA Women's World Cup again in 2023, also coached by Desiree Ellis. During the group stages they lost 2–1 to Sweden after leading 1–0, drew 2–2 against Argentina after leading 2–0, but finally defeated Italy 3–2 and advanced to the Round of 16 for the very first time. They eventually lost 2–0 to the Netherlands. Following the team's performance, Desiree Ellis would win the 2023 award for CAF Women's Coach of the Year.

The top goal scorers at world cups are Thembi Kgatlana with 3, Hildah Magaia with 2, while Linda Motlhalo also scored one. South Africa's other goal was an own goal by Italy in 2023.

=== COSAFA Women's Championship ===
South Africa competed in all eleven COSAFA Women's Championships – a tournament featuring nations from the Southern African region – since its inception in 2002. They have won seven titles (in 2002, 2006, 2008, 2017, 2018, 2019, and 2020), finished second twice (in 2011 and 2022) and only failed to win a medal twice, when they finished fourth in 2021 and exited in the group stages 2023.

In later years, because of South Africa's success and increased participation in bigger world events, management started sending newcomers to COSAFA tournaments, to broaden their talent pool. This contributed to a decline in Banyana Banyana's dominance at this event.

== Team image ==
=== Nicknames ===
The South Africa women's national football team has been known or nicknamed as "Banyana Banyana", which literally translates to "Girls Girls", but such double use is often interpreted to mean "all the girls". In the context of sport, it is also understood to mean "go girls, go girls".

This name is derived from the Senior Men's National team being "Bafana Bafana" which also literally means "the boys the boys". The nickname came into existence from fans shouting "bafana bafana" to mean "go boys, go boys" as encouragement during the South Africa men's team's first international game after many years of sporting isolation due to Apartheid policies in 1992, when they beat Cameroon 1–0 in Durban. The name stuck, and the female form was later applied to the women's team as well.

=== Naming rights ===
The team is currently branded as "Sasol Banyana Banyana", based on a multi-year financial investment in the team by Sasol.

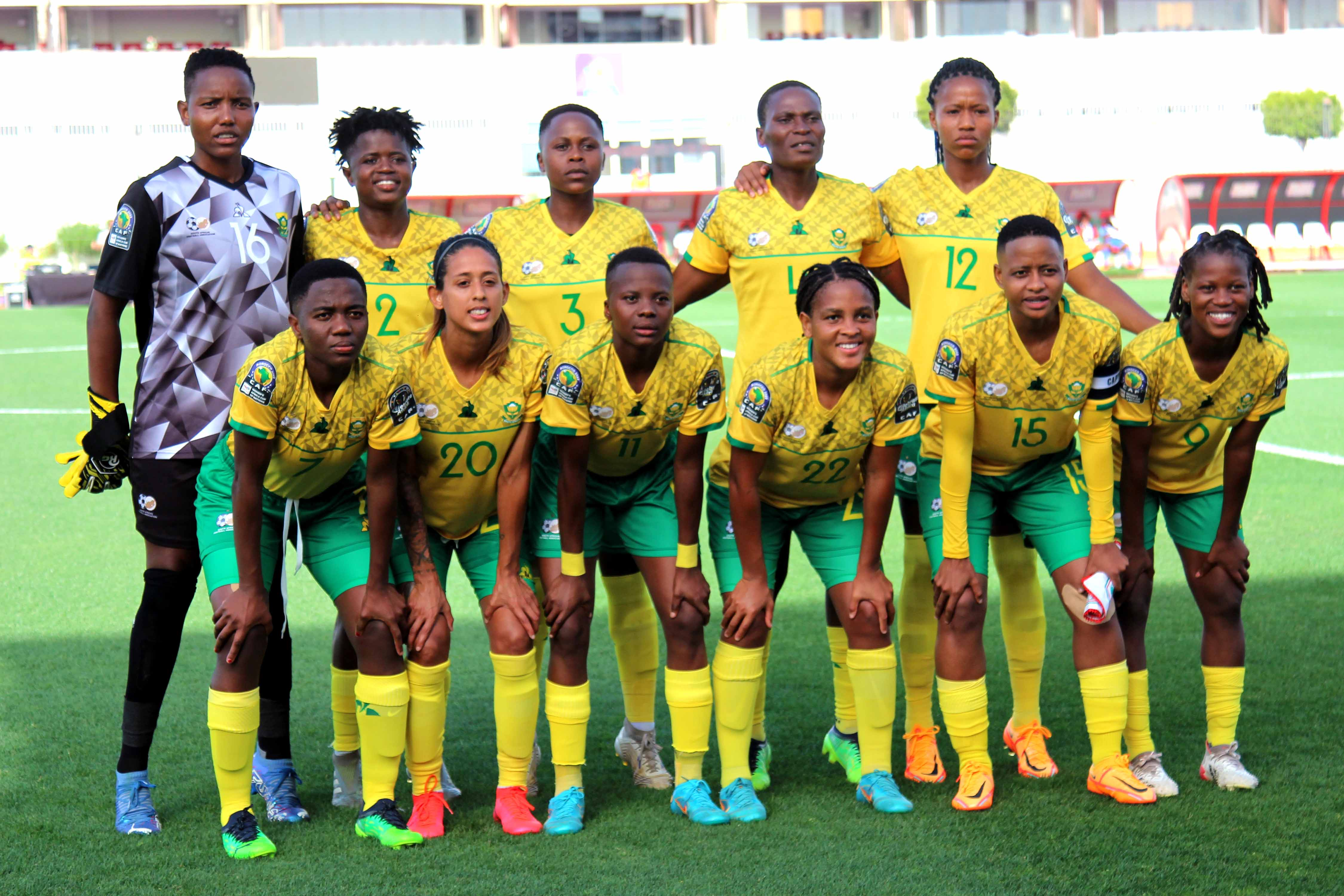
Banyana Banyana starting XI at the 2022 Women's Africa Cup of Nations in Morocco.

== Results and fixtures ==
The following is a list of match results in the last 12 months, as well as any future matches that have been scheduled.

Legend

Win Draw Loss Fixture Void or Postponed

=== 2025 ===
22 October WAFCON 2026 Q	DR Congo	1–1	South Africa	Kinshasa, DR Congo
17:00	Kipoyi 45+1'		Mohlakoana 42'	Stadium: Stade des Martyrs

28 October WAFCON 2026 Q	South Africa	1–0	DR Congo	Johannesburg, South Africa
19:00	Kgatlana 90+1'			Stadium: Dobsonville Stadium

30 November Friendly	Morocco	0–2	South Africa	Rabat, Morocco
			Mthandi 70'; Cesane 86'	Stadium: Stade Prince Moulay Abdallah

=== 2026 ===
18 February 2025 COSAFA Women's Championship	South Africa	2–0	Malawi	Polokwane, South Africa
15:00	Holweni 63'; Mokoma 90+1'	Report		Stadium: Old Peter Mokaba Stadium; Referee: Anna Banda (Zambia)

21 February 2025 COSAFA Women's Championship	South Africa	2–0	Angola	Seshego, South Africa
12:30	Salgado 12'; Mthandi 78'	Report		Stadium: Seshego Stadium; Referee: Grace Gimo (Zimbabwe)

24 February 2025 COSAFA Women's Championship	South Africa	1–1	Lesotho	Seshego, South Africa
15:00	Mphelo 39'	Report	Moalosi 30'	Stadium: Seshego Stadium; Referee: Élodie Livaharivony (Madagascar)

27 February 2025 COSAFA SF	South Africa	1–1 (4–2 p)	Zimbabwe	Polokwane, South Africa
15:00	Majiya 39'	Report	Chinyerere 11'	Stadium: New Peter Mokaba Stadium; Referee: Mathapelo Morake (Lesotho)
	Penalties
	Majiya (penalty scored); Mokoma (penalty scored); Pila (penalty scored); October (penalty scored)		(penalty scored) Chinyerere; (penalty scored) Kondo; (penalty missed) Sipini; (penalty missed) Ndlovu

1 March 2025 COSAFA Final	Namibia	2–1 (a.e.t.)	South Africa	Polokwane, South Africa
15:00	Hanavi 54'; Ngonda 92'	Report	Majiya 37'	Stadium: New Peter Mokaba Stadium; Referee: Rose Zimba (Malawi)

14 April Friendly	South Africa	1–0	Algeria	Durban, South Africa
15:00 UTC+2	Majiya 35'	Report (SAFA); Report (FAF)		Stadium: Princess Magogo Stadium; Referee: Vistoria Shangula (Namibia)

17 April Friendly	South Africa	2–0	Algeria	Durban, South Africa
15:00 UTC+2	Majiya 58'; O'Malley 86'	Report (SAFA); Report (FAF)		Stadium: King Zwelithini Stadium; Referee: Seonyatseng Tshephe (Botswana)

6 June Friendly	Japan	5–0	South Africa	Osaka, Japan
15:50 UTC+9	Seike 1', 19'; Tanikawa 29'; Fujino 49', 60'	Report		Stadium: Yodoko Sakura Stadium

9 June Friendly	Japan	0–1	South Africa	Osaka, Japan
15:30 UTC+9			Motlhalo 9'	Stadium: Natural Grass Main Field S1

27 July 2026 Women's Africa Cup of Nations	South Africa	1–2	Tanzania	Casablanca, Morocco
	Mbane 45+2'	Report (FIFA)	Msewa 37'; Ubamba 87'	Stadium: Stade Moulay Rachid

31 July 2026 Women's Africa Cup of Nations	South Africa	2–2	Ivory Coast	Casablanca, Morocco
	Kgatlana 71'; Ubamba 90+9'	Report (FIFA)	Sery 18'; Sery 36'	Stadium: Stade Moulay Rachid

4 August 2026 Women's Africa Cup of Nations	Burkina Faso	0–1	South Africa	Casablanca, Morocco
		Report (FIFA)	Kgatlana 21'	Stadium: Stade Moulay Rachid

8 August 2026 WAFCON QF	Morocco	2–1	South Africa	Rabat, Morocco
21:00 UTC+0	Ouzraoui 31'; Aït El Haj 51' (pen.)	Report (FIFA)	Kgatlana 67'	Stadium: Moulay El Hassan Stadium; Referee: Josephine Wanjiku (Kenya)

13 August 2026 CAF WAFCON 2026 PIM	South Africa	2–1	Nigeria	Casablanca, Morocco
21:00 (UTC+01:00)	Kgatlana 56'; Jane 77'	Report (FIFA)	Ucheibe 90+3' (pen.)	Stadium: Moulay Rachid Stadium; Referee: Aline Guimbang Etong (Cameroon)

9 October 2026 2028 Summer Olympic qualifying	Madagascar	0–4	South Africa	Bloemfontein, South Africa
15:00 UTC+2		Report	Donnelly 26', 37', 61'; Solange 78' (o.g.)	Stadium: Free State Stadium; Attendance: 0 (Behind closed doors)

13 October 2026 2028 Summer Olympic qualifying	South Africa	3–0	Madagascar	Bloemfontein, South Africa
18:00 UTC+2	Salgado 46'; Donnelly 64', 76'	Report		Stadium: Free State Stadium; Referee: Innocentia Ntangti (Cameroon)

28 November 2027 FIFA Women's World Cup qualification	Chinese Taipei	–	South Africa	Salé, Morocco
14:00 UTC+0				Stadium: Mohammed VI Football Academy

1 December 2027 FIFA Women's World Cup qualification	South Africa	–	Ecuador	Salé, Morocco
19:00 UTC+0				Stadium: Mohammed VI Football Academy

5 December 2027 FIFA Women's World Cup qualification	South Africa	–	Uzbekistan	Salé, Morocco
17:00 UTC+0				Stadium: Mohammed VI Football Academy

== Coaching staff ==
=== Current coaching staff ===
Coach	Name	Ref.
Head coach	(South Africa) Desiree Ellis	
Assistant coach	(South Africa) Thinasonke Mbuli	
Goalkeeper Coach	(South Africa) Cameron Cox	
Performance Analyst	(South Africa) Shilene Booysen	
Physical Trainer	(South Africa) Ridhaa Allie	
Kit Manager	(South Africa) Evah Mokwape	
General Manager	(South Africa) Lauren Duncan	

=== Manager history ===
All-time Banyana Banyana coaching records
Coach	Nat.	Tenure	Reference
Sandile Bali	South Africa	1995	
Nomalungelo Mooi	South Africa	1998	
Fran Hilton-Smith	South Africa	2000	
Greg Mashilo	South Africa	2002 – 2004	
August Makalakalane	South Africa	2006 – 2011	
Joseph Mkhonza	South Africa	2011 – 2014	
Vera Pauw	Netherlands	2014 – 2016	
Desiree Ellis	South Africa	2016 – present	

== Players ==
=== Current squad ===
The following players were called up for the 2026 WAFCON matches from 26 July through 16 August 2026.

Caps and goals correct as of 4 August 2026, after the match against Burkino Faso.

No.	Pos.	Player	Date of birth (age)	Caps	Goals	Club
1	GK	Kaylin Swart	30 September 1994 (age 32)	56	0	(South African Football Association) JVW
16	GK	Andile Dlamini	2 September 1992 (age 34)	87	0	(South African Football Association) Mamelodi Sundowns
21	GK	Kebotseng Moletsane	3 March 1995 (age 31)	5	0	(South African Football Association) UFH Ladies FC
2	DF	Lebohang Ramalepe	3 December 1991 (age 34)	123	5	(South African Football Association) Mamelodi Sundowns
4	DF	Lonathemba Mhlongo	23 August 2002 (age 24)	20	0	(South African Football Association) UWC Ladies FC
5	DF	Fikile Magama	19 January 2002 (age 24)	32	0	(South African Football Association) UWC Ladies FC
7	DF	Karabo Dhlamini	18 September 2001 (age 25)	55	1	(South African Football Association) Mamelodi Sundowns
12	DF	Asanda Hadebe	13 October 2003 (age 23)	20	0	(South African Football Association) Mamelodi Sundowns
13	DF	Bambanani Mbane	12 March 1990 (age 36)	106	6	(South African Football Association) Mamelodi Sundowns
24	DF	Antonia Maponya	17 October 1999 (age 27)	13	0	(South African Football Association) UWC Ladies FC
25	DF	Khutso Pila	31 May 2001 (age 25)	6	0	(South African Football Association) Mamelodi Sundowns
3	MF	Bongeka Gamede	22 May 1999 (age 27)	46	1	(Danish Football Association) Nordsjælland
6	MF	Noxolo Cesane	11 October 2000 (age 26)	63	6	(South African Football Association) Mamelodi Sundowns
9	MF	Gabriela Salgado	20 February 1998 (age 28)	50	8	(South African Football Association) JVW
10	MF	Linda Motlhalo	1 July 1998 (age 28)	102	25	(Scottish Football Association) Glasgow City
14	MF	Nonhlanhla Mthandi	19 August 1995 (age 31)	28	5	(South African Football Association) Mamelodi Sundowns
15	MF	Refiloe Jane (captain)	4 August 1992 (age 34)	153	17	(South African Football Association) TS Galaxy Queens
18	MF	Sibulele Holweni	28 April 2001 (age 25)	43	17	(Danish Football Association) Nordsjælland
19	MF	Isabella Ludwig	13 December 2002 (age 23)	15	0	(South African Football Association) Mamelodi Sundowns
20	MF	Robyn Salgado	16 June 1994 (age 32)	44	2	(South African Football Association) JVW
22	MF	Amogelang Motau	27 February 1997 (age 29)	31	4	(Mexican Football Federation) Club Tijuana
8	FW	Hildah Magaia	16 December 1994 (age 31)	50	24	(Mexican Football Federation) Club Tijuana
11	FW	Thembi Kgatlana	2 May 1996 (age 30)	91	35	(Mexican Football Federation) Tigres UANL
17	FW	Ronnel Donnelly	31 March 2004 (age 22)	7	1	(South African Football Association) UWC Ladies FC
23	FW	Nthabiseng Majiya	10 June 2004 (age 22)	20	6	(South African Football Association) Mamelodi Sundowns
26	FW	Zoe October	16 June 2008 (age 18)	3	0	(South African Football Association) UWC Ladies FC

=== Recent call ups ===
The following players have also been called up to the squad within the past 12 months.

Pos.	Player	Date of birth (age)	Caps	Goals	Club	Latest call-up
GK	Casey Gordon	3 December 2007 (age 18)	3	0	(South Africa) JVW	2025 COSAFA, 1 March 2026
GK	Dineo Magagula	14 October 1994 (age 32)	2	0	(South Africa) TS Galaxy Queens	2025 COSAFA, 1 March 2026
DF	Sinegugu Zondi ^{PRE}	6 May 1999 (age 27)	5	0	(South Africa) UWC Ladies FC	2026 WAFCOM, 26 July 2026
DF	Tiisetso Makhubela ^{PRE}	24 April 1997 (age 29)	40	2	(South Africa) Mamelodi Sundowns	2026 WAFCOM, 26 July 2026
DF	Shakira O'Malley ^{PRE}	3 January 2003 (age 23)	8	0	(South Africa) UWC Ladies FC	2026 WAFCOM, 26 July 2026
DF	Unathi Simayile	8 February 2001 (age 25)	5	0	(South Africa) UWC Ladies FC	2025 COSAFA, 1 March 2026
DF	Sibahle Maneli	18 March 2000 (age 26)	1	0	(South Africa) TS Galaxy Queens	2025 COSAFA, 1 March 2026
DF	Yolanda Nduli	18 January 2002 (age 24)	3	0	(South Africa) UJ Ladies FC	v. DR Congo, 28 October 2025
MF	Cimone Sauls ^{PRE}	30 September 2004 (age 22)	4	0	(South Africa) JVW	2026 WAFCOM, 26 July 2026
MF	Sbongakonke Mzobe	25 January 2005 (age 21)	4	0	(South Africa) UJ Ladies FC	v. Algeria, 17 April 2026
MF	Regina Mogolola	17 April 1993 (age 33)	15	0	(South Africa) JVW	2025 COSAFA, 1 March 2026
MF	Bongiwe Thusi	20 July 1991 (age 35)	6	0	(South Africa) JVW	2025 COSAFA, 1 March 2026
MF	Fiona Namanyana	December 2, 2001 (age 24)	1	0	(South Africa) Copperbelt Ladies	2025 COSAFA, 1 March 2026
MF	Jessica Wade	11 April 2003 (age 23)	1	0	(Denmark) Åland United	v. Morocco, 2 December 2025
FW	Bonolo Mokoma ^{PRE}	30 April 2008 (age 18)	11	1	(South Africa) JVW	2026 WAFCOM, 26 July 2026
FW	Wendy Shongwe	18 January 2003 (age 23)	9	0	(South Africa) Mamelodi Sundowns	v. Japan, 9 June 2026
FW	Thorisho Mphelo	30 April 2008 (age 18)	4	1	(South Africa) JVW	v. Japan, 9 June 2026
FW	Nicole Lauren Michael	17 January 2001 (age 25)	11	1	(South Africa) TS Galaxy Queens	v. Algeria, 17 April 2026
FW	Sinoxolo Cesane	11 October 2000 (age 26)	5	0	(Mexico) Mazatlán FC	v. DR Congo, 28 October 2025
Notes: ^{ALT} = Alternate; ^{INJ} = Withdrew due to injury; ^{MED} = Withdrew due to medical reasons; ^{PRE} = Preliminary squad / standby; ^{RET} = Retired from the national team

=== Previous squads ===
Turkish Women's Cup

- 2023 Turkish Women's Cup squads

== Records ==
As of 4 August 2026

Players in bold are still active with the national team.

=== Most appearances ===
Rank	Player	Career	Caps	Goals
1	Janine van Wyk	2005–2023	185	12
2	Noko Matlou	2007–2025	174	66
3	**Refiloe Jane**	2012–present	153	17
4	Nompumelelo Nyandeni	2002–2025	150	39
5	Nothando Vilakazi	2008–2022	137	7
6	Portia Modise	2000–2015	124	101
7	**Lebogang Ramalepe**	2014–present	123	5
8	Mamello Makhabane	2005–2022	121	22
9	Jermaine Seoposenwe	2010–2025	112	25
10	**Bambanani Mbane**	2016–present	106	6

=== Top goalscorers ===
Rank	Player	Career	Goals	Caps	Avg.
1	Portia Modise	2000–2015	101	124	0.81
2	Noko Matlou	2007–2025	66	174	0.38
3	Nompumelelo Nyandeni	2002–2025	39	150	0.26
4	**Thembi Kgatlana**	2014–present	35	91	0.38
5	**Linda Motlhalo**	2016–present	25	102	0.25
5	Jermaine Seoposenwe	2010–2025	25	112	0.22
7	**Hildah Magaia**	2018–present	24	50	0.48
7	Amanda Dlamini	2007–2017	24	105	0.23
9	Leandra Smeda	2010–2019	22	100	0.22
9	Mamello Makhabane	2005–2022	22	121	0.18

== Honours ==
Type	Competition	Titles	Seasons
Continental	Africa Women Cup of Nations	1	Champions (1): 2022 Runners-up (4): 2000, 2008, 2012, 2018 Third place(2): 2006, 2010
Continental	African Games	0	Runners-up (2): 2003, 2007
Regional	COSAFA Women's Championship	7	Champions (7): 2002, 2006, 2008, 2017, 2018, 2019, 2020 Runners-up (3): 2011, 2022, 2025

- Record
- ^{S} Shared record

=== Awards ===
- CAF National Team of the Year (Women): 2017, 2022
- Women's Africa Cup of Nations Fair play: 2014, 2022, 2024
- African Union Sports Council Region: Team of the Year: 2019

== Competitive record ==
=== FIFA Women's World Cup ===
FIFA Women's World Cup record
Year	Result	Pld	W	D*	L	GF	GA	GD	Squad
(China) 1991	Did not enter								
(Sweden) 1995	Did not qualify								
(United States) 1999	Did not qualify								
(United States) 2003	Did not qualify								
(China) 2007	Did not qualify								
(Germany) 2011	Did not qualify								
(Canada) 2015	Did not qualify								
(France) 2019	Group stage	3	0	0	3	1	8	−7	Squad
(Australia) (New Zealand) 2023	Round of 16	4	1	1	2	6	8	−2	Squad
(Brazil) 2027	To be determined in 2027 FIFA Women's World Cup qualification (inter-confederation play-offs)								
(Costa Rica) (Jamaica) (Mexico) (United States) 2031	To be determined								
(United Kingdom) 2035	To be determined								
Total:2/9	Round of 16	7	1	1	5	7	16	−9	

*Draws include knockout matches decided on penalty kicks.

FIFA Women's World Cup history
Year	Round	Date	Opponent	Result	Stadium
(France) 2019	Group stage	8 June	Spain	L 1–3	Stade Océane, Le Havre
(France) 2019	Group stage	13 June	China	L 0–1	Parc des Princes, Paris
(France) 2019	Group stage	17 June	Germany	L 0–4	Stade de la Mosson, Montpellier
(Australia) (New Zealand) 2023	Group Stage	23 July	Sweden	L 1–2	Wellington Regional Stadium, Wellington
(Australia) (New Zealand) 2023	Group Stage	28 July	Argentina	D 2–2	Forsyth Barr Stadium, Dunedin
(Australia) (New Zealand) 2023	Group Stage	2 August	Italy	W 3–2	Wellington Regional Stadium, Wellington
(Australia) (New Zealand) 2023	Round of 16	6 August	Netherlands	L 0–2	Sydney Football Stadium, Sydney

=== Olympic Games ===
Summer Olympics record
Year	Result	Pld	W	D*	L	GS	GA	GD	Squad
(United States) 1996	Did not qualify								
(Australia) 2000	Did not qualify								
(Greece) 2004	Did not qualify								
(China) 2008	Did not qualify								
(United Kingdom) 2012	Group stage	3	0	1	2	1	7	−6	Squad
(Brazil) 2016	Group stage	3	0	1	2	0	3	−3	Squad
(Japan) 2020	Did not qualify								
(France) 2024	Did not qualify								
Total	2/7	6	0	2	4	1	10	−9	

*Draws include knockout matches decided on penalty kicks.

=== Africa Women Cup of Nations ===
Women's Africa Cup of Nations record
Year	Round	Pld	W	D*	L	GS	GA	GD	Squad
1991	Banned								
1995	Runners-up	6	3	1	2	19	20	−1	
(Nigeria) 1998	Group stage	2	0	0	2	2	7	−5	
(South Africa) 2000	Runners-up	5	4	0	1	9	3	+6	Squad
(Nigeria) 2002	Fourth place	5	2	1	2	6	11	−5	
(South Africa) 2004	Group stage	3	0	0	3	2	7	−5	
(Nigeria) 2006	Third place	5	2	1	2	8	5	+3	
(Equatorial Guinea) 2008	Runners-up	5	3	0	2	7	4	+3	
(South Africa) 2010	Third place	5	3	0	2	10	6	+4	Squad
(Equatorial Guinea) 2012	Runners-up	5	3	0	2	6	6	0	Squad
(Namibia) 2014	Fourth place	5	1	1	3	7	6	+1	Squad
(Cameroon) 2016	Fourth place	5	1	1	3	5	3	+2	Squad
(Ghana) 2018	Runners-up	5	3	2	0	11	2	+9	Squad
2020	Cancelled due to Covid								
(Morocco) 2022	Champions	6	6	0	0	10	3	+7	Squad
(Morocco) 2024	Fourth place	6	2	3	1	9	4	+5	Squad
(Morocco) 2026	Quarter-final	5	2	1	2	7	7	0	Squad
Total	1 Title	73	35	11	27	118	94	+24	

*Draws include knockout matches decided on penalty kicks.

=== African Games ===
African Games record
Year	Result	Matches	Wins	Draws	Losses	GF	GA
(Nigeria) 2003	Runners- up	5	4	0	1	12	3
(Algeria) 2007	Runners- up	4	2	1	1	7	7
(Mozambique) 2011	Fourth place	5	1	2	2	8	10
(Republic of the Congo) 2015	5th	2	0	2	0	1	1
(Morocco) 2019	7th	2	0	0	2	0	4
(Ghana) 2023	Did not qualify						
Total	5/6	18	7	5	6	28	25

=== COSAFA Women's Championship ===
COSAFA Women's Championship record
Year	Round	Pld	W	D*	L	GS	GA	GD	Squad
(Zimbabwe) 2002	Champions	5	5	0	0	36	2	+34	
(Zambia) 2006	Champions	4	4	0	0	19	2	+17	
(Angola) 2008	Champions								
(Zimbabwe) 2011	Runners-up	5	4	0	1	14	3	+11	
(Zimbabwe) 2017	Champions	5	3	2	0	12	3	+9	
(South Africa) 2018	Champions	5	5	0	0	13	2	+11	
(South Africa) 2019	Champions	5	5	0	0	27	2	+25	
(South Africa) 2020	Champions	5	5	0	0	22	3	+19	Squad
(South Africa) 2021	Fourth place	5	2	2	1	8	6	+2	Squad
(South Africa) 2022	Runners-up	5	3	1	1	9	2	+7	Squad
(South Africa) 2023	Group stage	3	2	0	1	9	5	+4	Squad
(South Africa) 2024	Runners-up	5	3	2	0	13	2	+11	Squad
(South Africa) 2025	Runners-up	5	2	2	1	7	4	+3	Squad
Total	Winner	57	43	8	6	189	36	+153	

*Draws include knockout matches decided on penalty kicks.

== All−time record against FIFA recognized nations ==
The list shown below shows the women's South Africa national soccer team's all−time international record against opposing nations.
*As of xxxxxx after match against xxxx.

Key

Positive balance (more wins than losses)
Neutral balance (as many wins as losses)
Negative balance (more losses than wins)

Against	Pld	W	D	L	GF	GA	GD	Confederation

=== Record per opponent ===
*As ofxxxxx after match against xxxxx.

Key

Positive balance (more wins than losses)
Neutral balance (as many wins as losses)
Negative balance (more losses than wins)

The following table shows South Africa's all-time official international record per opponent:

Opponent	Pld	W	D	L	GF	GA	GD	W%	Confederation
Denmark	1	0	0	1	0	5	(5)	0	UEFA
Jamaica	3	0	1	2	3	7	(4)	0	CONCACAF
Japan	4	1	0	3	2	11	(9)	0	AFC
Total									—

== See also ==
- Sport in South Africa
  - Football in South Africa
    - Women's football in South Africa

National teams

- South Africa women's national football team
  - South Africa women's national football team results
- South Africa women's national under-20 soccer team
- South Africa women's national under-17 soccer team
- South Africa women's national under-15 soccer team
