= 2019 FIFA Women's World Cup Group B =

Football tournament group stage

Group B of the 2019 FIFA Women's World Cup took place from 8 to 17 June 2019. The group consisted of China, Germany, South Africa and Spain. The top two teams, Germany and Spain, along with the third-placed team, China (as one of the four best third-placed teams), advanced to the round of 16.

== Teams ==
Draw position	Team	Pot	Confederation	Method of qualification	Date of qualification	Finals appearance	Last appearance	Previous best performance	FIFA Rankings	
Draw position	Team	Pot	Confederation	Method of qualification	Date of qualification	Finals appearance	Last appearance	Previous best performance	December 2018 (Note: The rankings of December 2018 were used for seeding for the final draw.)	March 2019
B1	Germany	1	UEFA	UEFA Group 5 winners	4 September 2018	8th	2015	Winners (2003, 2007)	2	2
B2	China	3	AFC	AFC Women's Asian Cup 3rd place	9 April 2018	7th	2015	Runners-up (1999)	15	16
B3	Spain	2	UEFA	UEFA Group 7 winners	8 June 2018	2nd	2015	Group stage (2015)	12	13
B4	South Africa	4	CAF	Africa Women Cup of Nations runners-up	27 November 2018	1st	—	Debut	48	49

== Standings ==
Pos	Team	Pld	W	D	L	GF	GA	GD	Pts	Qualification
1	Germany	3	3	0	0	6	0	+6	9	Advance to knockout stage
2	Spain	3	1	1	1	3	2	+1	4	Advance to knockout stage
3	China	3	1	1	1	1	1	0	4	Advance to knockout stage
4	South Africa	3	0	0	3	1	8	−7	0	

Source: FIFA
Rules for classification: Group stage tiebreakers

In the round of 16:

- The winners of Group B, Germany, advanced to play the third-placed team of Group A, Nigeria.
- The runners-up of Group B, Spain, advanced to play the winners of Group F, the United States.
- The third-placed team of Group B, China, advanced to play the winners of Group C, Italy (as one of the four best third-placed teams).

== Matches ==
All times listed are local, CEST (UTC+2).

=== Germany vs China ===
8 June 2019
15:00

Germany	1–0	China
Gwinn 66'	Report

Roazhon Park, Rennes
Attendance: 15,283
Referee: Marie-Soleil Beaudoin (Canada)

Germany	China

GK	1	Almuth Schult
RB	3	Kathrin Hendrich
CB	5	Marina Hegering
CB	23	Sara Doorsoun
LB	2	Carolin Simon		(substituted off) 46'
DM	18	Melanie Leupolz		(substituted off) 63'
CM	10	Dzsenifer Marozsán
CM	13	Sara Däbritz
RM	9	Svenja Huth		(substituted off) 85'
LM	15	Giulia Gwinn
CF	11	Alexandra Popp (c)
Substitutions:
MF	6	Lena Oberdorf	(yellow card) 82'	(substituted on) 46'
FW	20	Lina Magull		(substituted on) 63'
MF	7	Lea Schüller		(substituted on) 85'
Manager:
Martina Voss-Tecklenburg

GK	12	Peng Shimeng
RB	3	Lin Yuping
CB	6	Han Peng
CB	5	Wu Haiyan (c)
LB	2	Liu Shanshan	(yellow card) 50'
RM	4	Lou Jiahui		(substituted off) 33'
CM	20	Zhang Rui
CM	21	Yao Wei		(substituted off) 46'
LM	17	Gu Yasha
CF	11	Wang Shanshan	(yellow card) 12'
CF	9	Yang Li	(yellow card) 44'	(substituted off) 69'
Substitutions:
MF	19	Tan Ruyin		(substituted on) 33'
MF	7	Wang Shuang	(yellow card) 71'	(substituted on) 46'
FW	15	Song Duan		(substituted on) 69'
Manager:
Jia Xiuquan

Player of the Match:
Giulia Gwinn (Germany)

Assistant referees:
Princess Brown (Jamaica)
Stephanie-Dale Yee Sing (Jamaica)
Fourth official:
Lucila Venegas (Mexico)
Reserve assistant referee:
Mayte Chávez (Mexico)
Video assistant referee:
Massimiliano Irrati (Italy)
Assistant video assistant referees:
Paolo Valeri (Italy)
Sarah Jones (New Zealand)

=== Spain vs South Africa ===
8 June 2019
18:00

Spain	3–1	South Africa
Hermoso 69' (pen.), 82' (pen.); L. García 89'	Report	Kgatlana 25'

Stade Océane, Le Havre
Attendance: 12,044
Referee: María Carvajal (Chile)

Spain	South Africa

GK	13	Sandra Paños
RB	8	Marta Torrejón (c)
CB	4	Irene Paredes
CB	16	María Pilar León
LB	7	Marta Corredera	(yellow card) 90+4'
DM	14	Virginia Torrecilla
CM	6	Vicky Losada		(substituted off) 46'
CM	11	Alexia Putellas		(substituted off) 73'
RM	19	Amanda Sampedro		(substituted off) 46'
LM	9	Mariona Caldentey
CF	10	Jennifer Hermoso
Substitutions:
MF	18	Aitana Bonmatí		(substituted on) 46'
FW	17	Lucía García		(substituted on) 46'
FW	22	Nahikari García		(substituted on) 73'
Manager:
Jorge Vilda

GK	16	Andile Dlamini
RB	2	Lebogang Ramalepe
CB	5	Janine van Wyk (c)	(yellow card) 68'
CB	4	Noko Matlou
LB	3	Nothando Vilakazi	(yellow card) 59' (yellow-red card) 81'
RM	10	Linda Motlhalo		(substituted off) 52'
CM	19	Kholosa Biyana	(yellow card) 77'
CM	15	Refiloe Jane
LM	9	Amanda Mthandi		(substituted off) 56'
CF	8	Ode Fulutudilu		(substituted off) 77'
CF	11	Thembi Kgatlana
Substitutions:
MF	21	Busisiwe Ndimeni		(substituted on) 52'
FW	12	Jermaine Seoposenwe		(substituted on) 56'
MF	17	Leandra Smeda		(substituted on) 77'
Manager:
Desiree Ellis

Player of the Match:
Jennifer Hermoso (Spain)

Assistant referees:
Leslie Vásquez (Chile)
Loreto Toloza (Chile)
Fourth official:
Laura Fortunato (Argentina)
Reserve assistant referee:
Mary Blanco (Colombia)
Video assistant referee:
Mauro Vigliano (Argentina)
Assistant video assistant referees:
Tiago Martins (Portugal)
Mariana de Almeida (Argentina)

=== Germany vs Spain ===
12 June 2019
18:00

Germany	1–0	Spain
Däbritz 42'	Report

Stade du Hainaut, Valenciennes
Attendance: 20,761
Referee: Kateryna Monzul (Ukraine)

Germany	Spain

GK	1	Almuth Schult
RB	3	Kathrin Hendrich		(substituted off) 46'
CB	5	Marina Hegering
CB	23	Sara Doorsoun
LB	15	Giulia Gwinn
CM	8	Lena Goeßling		(substituted off) 80'
CM	13	Sara Däbritz
CM	6	Lena Oberdorf		(substituted off) 64'
RF	9	Svenja Huth
CF	11	Alexandra Popp (c)
LF	17	Verena Schweers	(yellow card) 63'
Substitutions:
FW	19	Klara Bühl		(substituted on) 46'
FW	20	Lina Magull		(substituted on) 64'
FW	18	Melanie Leupolz		(substituted on) 80'
Manager:
Martina Voss-Tecklenburg

GK	13	Sandra Paños
RB	8	Marta Torrejón (c)
CB	4	Irene Paredes
CB	16	María Pilar León
LB	7	Marta Corredera
CM	15	Silvia Meseguer	(substituted off) 66'
CM	10	Jennifer Hermoso
CM	14	Virginia Torrecilla
RF	9	Mariona Caldentey	(substituted off) 59'
CF	22	Nahikari García
LF	11	Alexia Putellas	(substituted off) 77'
Substitutions:
FW	17	Lucía García	(substituted on) 59'
MF	12	Patricia Guijarro	(substituted on) 66'
MF	18	Aitana Bonmatí	(substituted on) 77'
Manager:
Jorge Vilda

Player of the Match:
Sara Däbritz (Germany)

Assistant referees:
Maryna Striletska (Ukraine)
Oleksandra Ardasheva (Ukraine)
Fourth official:
Sandra Braz (Portugal)
Reserve assistant referee:
Mihaela Țepușă (Romania)
Video assistant referee:
Danny Makkelie (Netherlands)
Assistant video assistant referees:
Paweł Gil (Poland)
Michelle O'Neill (Republic of Ireland)

=== South Africa vs China ===
13 June 2019
21:00

South Africa	0–1	China
	Report	Li Ying 40'

Parc des Princes, Paris
Attendance: 20,011
Referee: Katalin Kulcsár (Hungary)

South Africa	China

GK	20	Kaylin Swart
RB	2	Lebogang Ramalepe
CB	5	Janine van Wyk (c)
CB	4	Noko Matlou	(yellow card) 83'
LB	23	Sibulele Holweni		(substituted off) 72'
DM	13	Bambanani Mbane
CM	6	Mamello Makhabane
CM	19	Kholosa Biyana
RM	11	Thembi Kgatlana
LM	15	Refiloe Jane		(substituted off) 82'
CF	8	Ode Fulutudilu		(substituted off) 60'
Substitutions:
FW	12	Jermaine Seoposenwe		(substituted on) 60'
MF	17	Leandra Smeda		(substituted on) 72'
MF	10	Linda Motlhalo		(substituted on) 82'
Manager:
Desiree Ellis

GK	12	Peng Shimeng
CB	3	Lin Yuping
CB	6	Han Peng
CB	5	Wu Haiyan (c)
RWB	13	Wang Yan	(substituted off) 81'
LWB	2	Liu Shanshan
CM	7	Wang Shuang
CM	20	Zhang Rui
CM	17	Gu Yasha	(substituted off) 65'
CF	11	Wang Shanshan
CF	10	Li Ying	(substituted off) 78'
Substitutions:
MF	4	Lou Jiahui	(substituted on) 65'
MF	21	Yao Wei	(substituted on) 78'
FW	9	Yang Li	(substituted on) 81'
Manager:
Jia Xiuquan

Player of the Match:
Li Ying (China)

Assistant referees:
Katalin Török (Hungary)
Sanja Rođak-Karšić (Croatia)
Fourth official:
Jana Adámková (Czech Republic)
Reserve assistant referee:
Stephanie-Dale Yee Sing (Jamaica)
Video assistant referee:
Chris Beath (Australia)
Assistant video assistant referees:
Mohammed Abdulla Hassan Mohamed (United Arab Emirates)
Manuela Nicolosi (France)

=== South Africa vs Germany ===
17 June 2019
18:00

South Africa	0–4	Germany
	Report	Leupolz 14'; Däbritz 29'; Popp 40'; Magull 58'

Stade de la Mosson, Montpellier
Attendance: 15,502
Referee: Sandra Braz (Portugal)

South Africa	Germany

GK	16	Andile Dlamini
RB	2	Lebogang Ramalepe	(yellow card) 53'
CB	5	Janine van Wyk (c)
CB	4	Noko Matlou
LB	3	Nothando Vilakazi	(yellow card) 58'
DM	15	Refiloe Jane
CM	19	Kholosa Biyana		(substituted off) 89'
CM	6	Mamello Makhabane
RM	9	Amanda Mthandi		(substituted off) 46'
LM	21	Busisiwe Ndimeni
CF	8	Ode Fulutudilu		(substituted off) 46'
Substitutions:
FW	11	Thembi Kgatlana		(substituted on) 46'
FW	22	Rhoda Mulaudzi	(yellow card) 66'	(substituted on) 46'
MF	17	Leandra Smeda		(substituted on) 89'
Manager:
Desiree Ellis

GK	1	Almuth Schult
RB	15	Giulia Gwinn
CB	23	Sara Doorsoun
CB	5	Marina Hegering
LB	17	Verena Schweers		(substituted off) 46'
RM	9	Svenja Huth		(substituted off) 59'
CM	18	Melanie Leupolz
CM	20	Lina Magull	(yellow card) 54'
LM	13	Sara Däbritz
CF	11	Alexandra Popp (c)
CF	19	Klara Bühl		(substituted off) 66'
Substitutions:
DF	2	Carolin Simon		(substituted on) 46'
MF	16	Linda Dallmann		(substituted on) 59'
MF	7	Lea Schüller		(substituted on) 66'
Manager:
Martina Voss-Tecklenburg

Player of the Match:
Sara Däbritz (Germany)

Assistant referees:
Julia Magnusson (Sweden)
Lisa Rashid (England)
Fourth official:
Stéphanie Frappart (France)
Reserve assistant referee:
Michelle O'Neill (Republic of Ireland)
Video assistant referee:
Clément Turpin (France)
Assistant video assistant referees:
Drew Fischer (Canada)
Manuela Nicolosi (France)

=== China vs Spain ===
17 June 2019
18:00

China	0–0	Spain
	Report

Stade Océane, Le Havre
Attendance: 11,814
Referee: Edina Alves Batista (Brazil)

China	Spain

GK	12	Peng Shimeng
RB	6	Han Peng
CB	5	Wu Haiyan (c)
CB	3	Lin Yuping
LB	2	Liu Shanshan
RM	7	Wang Shuang		(substituted off) 55'
CM	20	Zhang Rui
CM	13	Wang Yan
LM	17	Gu Yasha		(substituted off) 87'
CF	11	Wang Shanshan		(substituted off) 46'
CF	10	Li Ying
Substitutions:
FW	9	Yang Li		(substituted on) 46'
MF	16	Li Wen	(yellow card) 63'	(substituted on) 55'
MF	21	Yao Wei		(substituted on) 87'
Manager:
Jia Xiuquan

GK	13	Sandra Paños
RB	7	Marta Corredera
CB	4	Irene Paredes (c)
CB	16	María Pilar León
LB	3	Leila Ouahabi
RM	17	Lucía García	(substituted off) 86'
CM	12	Patricia Guijarro
CM	14	Virginia Torrecilla
LM	9	Mariona Caldentey	(substituted off) 46'
CF	10	Jennifer Hermoso
CF	22	Nahikari García	(substituted off) 67'
Substitutions:
MF	21	Andrea Falcón	(substituted on) 46'
MF	11	Alexia Putellas	(substituted on) 67'
DF	2	Celia Jiménez	(substituted on) 86'
Manager:
Jorge Vilda

Player of the Match:
Peng Shimeng (China)

Assistant referees:
Neuza Back (Brazil)
Tatiane Sacilotti (Brazil)
Fourth official:
Laura Fortunato (Argentina)
Reserve assistant referee:
Mary Blanco (Colombia)
Video assistant referee:
Mauro Vigliano (Argentina)
Assistant video assistant referees:
Tiago Martins (Portugal)
Mariana de Almeida (Argentina)

== Discipline ==
Fair play points would have been used as tiebreakers in the group if the overall and head-to-head records of teams were tied, or if teams had the same record in the ranking of third-placed teams. These were calculated based on yellow and red cards received in all group matches as follows:

- first yellow card: minus 1 point;
- indirect red card (second yellow card): minus 3 points;
- direct red card: minus 4 points;
- yellow card and direct red card: minus 5 points;

Only one of the above deductions were applied to a player in a single match.

Team	Match 1				Match 2				Match 3				Points
Team	Yellow card	(yellow card) (yellow-red card)	Red card	(yellow card) (red card)	Yellow card	(yellow card) (yellow-red card)	Red card	(yellow card) (red card)	Yellow card	(yellow card) (yellow-red card)	Red card	(yellow card) (red card)	Points
Spain	1												−1
Germany	1				1				1				−3
China	4								1				−5
South Africa	2	1			1				3				−9

== See also ==
- China at the FIFA Women's World Cup
- Germany at the FIFA Women's World Cup
- South Africa at the FIFA Women's World Cup
- Spain at the FIFA Women's World Cup
