= 2023 FIFA Women's World Cup Group G =

Football tournament teams

Group G of the 2023 FIFA Women's World Cup was one of eight groups that formed the opening round of the tournament with the matches being played from 23 July to 2 August 2023. The group consisted of Sweden, South Africa, Italy and Argentina. The top two teams, Sweden and South Africa, advanced to the round of 16.

Sweden won a Women's World Cup group for only the second time in tournament's history, and the first since 2011. South Africa advanced to a senior World Cup knockout stage for the first time ever at the expense of Italy, who were eliminated in the Women's World Cup group stage for only the second time ever, and the first since 1999. This was also statistically Italy's worst Women's World Cup performance; they only recorded three points (one less than in 1999), and for the first time ever finished with a negative goal difference.

== Teams ==
Draw position	Team	Pot	Confederation	Method of qualification	Date of qualification	Finals appearance	Last appearance	Previous best performance	FIFA Rankings	
Draw position	Team	Pot	Confederation	Method of qualification	Date of qualification	Finals appearance	Last appearance	Previous best performance	October 2022 (Note: The rankings of October 2022 were used for seeding for the final draw.)	June 2023
G1	Sweden	1	UEFA	UEFA Group A winners	12 April 2022	9th	2019	Runners-up (2003)	2	3
G2	South Africa	4	CAF	2022 Women's Africa Cup of Nations champions	14 July 2022	2nd	2019	Group stage (2019)	54	54
G3	Italy	2	UEFA	UEFA Group G winners	6 September 2022	4th	2019	Quarter-finals (1991, 2019)	14	16
G4	Argentina	3	CONMEBOL	2022 Copa América Femenina third place	29 July 2022	4th	2019	Group stage (2003, 2007, 2019)	29	28

== Standings ==
Pos	Team	Pld	W	D	L	GF	GA	GD	Pts	Qualification
1	Sweden	3	3	0	0	9	1	+8	9	Advance to knockout stage
2	South Africa	3	1	1	1	6	6	0	4	Advance to knockout stage
3	Italy	3	1	0	2	3	8	−5	3	
4	Argentina	3	0	1	2	2	5	−3	1	

Source: FIFA
Rules for classification: Group stage tiebreakers

In the round of 16:

- The winners of Group G, Sweden, advanced to play the runners-up of Group E, the United States.
- The runners-up of Group G, South Africa, advanced to play the winners of Group E, the Netherlands.

== Matches ==
All times listed are local, NZST (UTC+12).

=== Sweden vs South Africa ===
23 July 2023
17:00

Sweden	2–1	South Africa
Rolfö 65'; Ilestedt 90'	Report	Magaia 48'

Wellington Regional Stadium, Wellington
Attendance: 18,317
Referee: Ekaterina Koroleva (United States)

Sweden	South Africa

GK	1	Zećira Mušović
RB	14	Nathalie Björn
CB	13	Amanda Ilestedt
CB	6	Magdalena Eriksson
LB	2	Jonna Andersson
CM	16	Filippa Angeldahl	(substituted off) 67'
CM	23	Elin Rubensson	(substituted off) 81'
RW	19	Johanna Rytting Kaneryd	(substituted off) 88'
AM	9	Kosovare Asllani (c)
LW	18	Fridolina Rolfö	(substituted off) 67'
CF	11	Stina Blackstenius	(substituted off) 67'
Substitutions:
MF	20	Hanna Bennison	(substituted on) 67'
FW	15	Rebecka Blomqvist	(substituted on) 67'
MF	22	Olivia Schough	(substituted on) 67'
MF	17	Caroline Seger	(substituted on) 81'
FW	8	Lina Hurtig	(substituted on) 88'
Manager:
Peter Gerhardsson

GK	1	Kaylin Swart
RB	2	Lebogang Ramalepe
CB	13	Bambanani Mbane
CB	3	Bongeka Gamede
LB	18	Sibulele Holweni
CM	15	Refiloe Jane (c)	(yellow card) 89'
CM	19	Kholosa Biyana	(yellow card) 74'
RW	12	Jermaine Seoposenwe
AM	10	Linda Motlhalo		(substituted off) 67'
LW	8	Hildah Magaia		(substituted off) 56'
CF	11	Thembi Kgatlana
Substitutions:
MF	9	Gabriela Salgado		(substituted on) 56'
MF	22	Nomvula Kgoale		(substituted on) 67'
Manager:
Desiree Ellis

Player of the Match:
Amanda Ilestedt (Sweden)

Assistant referees:
Kathryn Nesbitt (United States)
Felisha Mariscal (United States)
Fourth official:
Kim Yu-jeong (South Korea)
Video assistant referee:
Carol Anne Chenard (Canada)
Assistant video assistant referee:
Tatiana Guzmán (Nicaragua)
Offside video assistant referee:
Enedina Caudillo (Mexico)

=== Italy vs Argentina ===
24 July 2023
18:00

Italy	1–0	Argentina
Girelli 87'	Report

Eden Park, Auckland
Attendance: 30,889
Referee: Melissa Borjas (Honduras)

Italy	Argentina

GK	22	Francesca Durante
RB	4	Lucia Di Guglielmo
CB	5	Elena Linari
CB	23	Cecilia Salvai
LB	17	Lisa Boattin
CM	6	Manuela Giugliano
CM	18	Arianna Caruso	(yellow card) 25'	(substituted off) 58'
RW	8	Barbara Bonansea (c)	(yellow card) 85'
AM	16	Giulia Dragoni		(substituted off) 83'
LW	14	Chiara Beccari
CF	9	Valentina Giacinti		(substituted off) 74'
Substitutions:
MF	20	Giada Greggi		(substituted on) 58'
FW	7	Sofia Cantore		(substituted on) 74'
FW	10	Cristiana Girelli		(substituted on) 83'
Manager:
Milena Bertolini

GK	1	Vanina Correa (c)
RB	13	Sophia Braun
CB	14	Miriam Mayorga	(yellow card) 68'
CB	6	Aldana Cometti
LB	3	Eliana Stábile	(yellow card) 90+6'
RM	7	Romina Núñez		(substituted off) 77'
CM	8	Daiana Falfán		(substituted off) 90+2'
CM	16	Lorena Benítez
CM	22	Estefanía Banini
LM	15	Florencia Bonsegundo	(yellow card) 76'
CF	19	Mariana Larroquette	(yellow card) 12'	(substituted off) 90+2'
Substitutions:
FW	11	Yamila Rodríguez		(substituted on) 77'
FW	9	Paulina Gramaglia		(substituted on) 90+2'
MF	10	Dalila Ippólito		(substituted on) 90+2'
Manager:
Germán Portanova

Player of the Match:
Cristiana Girelli (Italy)

Assistant referees:
Shirley Perelló (Honduras)
Sandra Ramírez (Mexico)
Fourth official:
Ivana Martinčić (Croatia)
Video assistant referee:
Tatiana Guzmán (Nicaragua)
Assistant video assistant referee:
Armando Villarreal (United States)
Offside video assistant referee:
Chantal Boudreau (Canada)

=== Argentina vs South Africa ===
28 July 2023
12:00

Argentina	2–2	South Africa
Braun 74'; Núñez 79'	Report	Motlhalo 30'; Kgatlana 66'

Forsyth Barr Stadium, Dunedin
Attendance: 8,834
Referee: Anna-Marie Keighley (New Zealand)

Argentina	South Africa

GK	1	Vanina Correa (c)
RB	13	Sophia Braun
CB	14	Miriam Mayorga	(yellow card) 45+1'
CB	6	Aldana Cometti
LB	3	Eliana Stábile
RM	19	Mariana Larroquette		(substituted off) 69'
CM	8	Daiana Falfán		(substituted off) 46'
CM	16	Lorena Benítez		(substituted off) 46'
CM	15	Florencia Bonsegundo
LM	22	Estefanía Banini
CF	9	Paulina Gramaglia		(substituted off) 59'
Substitutions:
FW	7	Romina Núñez		(substituted on) 46'
DF	4	Julieta Cruz		(substituted on) 46'
FW	11	Yamila Rodríguez		(substituted on) 59'
FW	21	Érica Lonigro		(substituted on) 69'
Manager:
Germán Portanova

GK	1	Kaylin Swart
RB	2	Lebogang Ramalepe
CB	13	Bambanani Mbane
CB	3	Bongeka Gamede
LB	7	Karabo Dhlamini
CM	15	Refiloe Jane (c)		(substituted off) 25'
CM	10	Linda Motlhalo		(substituted off) 83'
RW	6	Noxolo Cesane		(substituted off) 54'
AM	12	Jermaine Seoposenwe
LW	8	Hildah Magaia
CF	11	Thembi Kgatlana		(substituted off) 83'
Substitutions:
MF	19	Kholosa Biyana	(yellow card) 43'	(substituted on) 25' (substituted off) 54'
DF	14	Tiisetso Makhubela	(yellow card) 56'	(substituted on) 54'
MF	18	Sibulele Holweni		(substituted on) 54'
MF	22	Nomvula Kgoale		(substituted on) 83'
FW	17	Melinda Kgadiete		(substituted on) 83'
Manager:
Desiree Ellis

Player of the Match:
Thembi Kgatlana (South Africa)

Assistant referees:
Sarah Jones (New Zealand)
Maria Salamasina (Samoa)
Fourth official:
Iuliana Demetrescu (Romania)
Video assistant referee:
Abdulla Al-Marri (Qatar)
Assistant video assistant referee:
Drew Fischer (Canada)
Offside video assistant referee:
Felisha Mariscal (United States)

=== Sweden vs Italy ===
29 July 2023
19:30

Sweden	5–0	Italy
Ilestedt 39', 50'; Rolfö 44'; Blackstenius 45+1'; Blomqvist 90+5'	Report

Wellington Regional Stadium, Wellington
Attendance: 29,143
Referee: Cheryl Foster (Wales)

Sweden	Italy

GK	1	Zećira Mušović
RB	14	Nathalie Björn
CB	13	Amanda Ilestedt
CB	6	Magdalena Eriksson
LB	2	Jonna Andersson
CM	16	Filippa Angeldahl
CM	23	Elin Rubensson	(substituted off) 75'
RW	19	Johanna Rytting Kaneryd	(substituted off) 75'
AM	9	Kosovare Asllani (c)	(substituted off) 62'
LW	18	Fridolina Rolfö	(substituted off) 62'
CF	11	Stina Blackstenius	(substituted off) 89'
Substitutions:
MF	22	Olivia Schough	(substituted on) 62'
FW	7	Madelen Janogy	(substituted on) 62'
MF	17	Caroline Seger	(substituted on) 75'
FW	10	Sofia Jakobsson	(substituted on) 75'
FW	15	Rebecka Blomqvist	(substituted on) 89'
Manager:
Peter Gerhardsson

GK	22	Francesca Durante
RB	4	Lucia Di Guglielmo	(substituted off) 59'
CB	5	Elena Linari
CB	23	Cecilia Salvai
LB	17	Lisa Boattin
CM	6	Manuela Giugliano
CM	18	Arianna Caruso	(substituted off) 71'
RW	7	Sofia Cantore
AM	16	Giulia Dragoni	(substituted off) 59'
LW	8	Barbara Bonansea (c)	(substituted off) 59'
CF	14	Chiara Beccari	(substituted off) 75'
Substitutions:
DF	19	Martina Lenzini	(substituted on) 59'
FW	15	Annamaria Serturini	(substituted on) 59'
MF	20	Giada Greggi	(substituted on) 59'
MF	21	Valentina Cernoia	(substituted on) 71'
FW	9	Valentina Giacinti	(substituted on) 75'
Manager:
Milena Bertolini

Player of the Match:
Amanda Ilestedt (Sweden)

Assistant referees:
Michelle O'Neill (Republic of Ireland)
Franca Overtoom (Netherlands)
Fourth official:
Myriam Marcotte (Canada)
Video assistant referee:
Pol van Boekel (Netherlands)
Assistant video assistant referee:
Marco Fritz (Germany)
Offside video assistant referee:
Ella De Vries (Belgium)

=== Argentina vs Sweden ===
2 August 2023
19:00

Argentina	0–2	Sweden
	Report	Blomqvist 66'; Rubensson 90' (pen.)

Waikato Stadium, Hamilton
Attendance: 17,907
Referee: Salima Mukansanga (Rwanda)

Argentina	Sweden

GK	1	Vanina Correa (c)
RB	4	Julieta Cruz		(substituted off) 71'
CB	2	Adriana Sachs
CB	6	Aldana Cometti
LB	3	Eliana Stábile
DM	13	Sophia Braun
CM	17	Camila Gómez Ares	(yellow card) 45+4'	(substituted off) 71'
CM	15	Florencia Bonsegundo		(substituted off) 41'
RF	7	Romina Núñez
CF	19	Mariana Larroquette		(substituted off) 79'
LF	22	Estefanía Banini
Substitutions:
MF	8	Daiana Falfán		(substituted on) 41'	(substituted off) 79'
MF	10	Dalila Ippólito		(substituted on) 71'
DF	18	Gabriela Chávez		(substituted on) 71'
FW	21	Érica Lonigro		(substituted on) 79'
FW	11	Yamila Rodríguez		(substituted on) 79'
Manager:
Germán Portanova

GK	12	Jennifer Falk
RB	4	Stina Lennartsson
CB	13	Amanda Ilestedt		(substituted off) 62'
CB	6	Magdalena Eriksson
LB	5	Anna Sandberg
CM	20	Hanna Bennison
CM	17	Caroline Seger (c)		(substituted off) 46'
RW	10	Sofia Jakobsson		(substituted off) 76'
AM	7	Madelen Janogy		(substituted off) 90+3'
LW	22	Olivia Schough	(yellow card) 20'	(substituted off) 62'
CF	15	Rebecka Blomqvist
Substitutions:
MF	23	Elin Rubensson		(substituted on) 46'
FW	8	Lina Hurtig		(substituted on) 62'
DF	3	Linda Sembrant		(substituted on) 62'
MF	19	Johanna Rytting Kaneryd		(substituted on) 76'
FW	11	Stina Blackstenius		(substituted on) 90+3'
Manager:
Peter Gerhardsson

Player of the Match:
Rebecka Blomqvist (Sweden)

Assistant referees:
Queency Victoire (Mauritius)
Mary Njoroge (Kenya)
Fourth official:
Kim Yu-jeong (South Korea)
Video assistant referee:
Adil Zourak (Morocco)
Assistant video assistant referee:
Tatiana Guzmán (Nicaragua)
Offside video assistant referee:
Fatiha Jermoumi (Morocco)

=== South Africa vs Italy ===
2 August 2023
19:00

South Africa	3–2	Italy
Orsi 32' (o.g.); Magaia 67'; Kgatlana 90+2'	Report	Caruso 11' (pen.), 74'

Wellington Regional Stadium, Wellington
Attendance: 14,967
Referee: María Carvajal (Chile)

South Africa	Italy

GK	1	Kaylin Swart
RB	2	Lebogang Ramalepe	(substituted off) 90+5'
CB	13	Bambanani Mbane
CB	4	Noko Matlou
LB	7	Karabo Dhlamini	(substituted off) 90+15'
CM	20	Robyn Moodaly	(substituted off) 46'
CM	3	Bongeka Gamede
RW	8	Hildah Magaia	(substituted off) 90+5'
AM	10	Linda Motlhalo
LW	12	Jermaine Seoposenwe
CF	11	Thembi Kgatlana (c)
Substitutions:
MF	22	Nomvula Kgoale	(substituted on) 46'
DF	14	Tiisetso Makhubela	(substituted on) 90+5'
FW	23	Wendy Shongwe	(substituted on) 90+5'
MF	18	Sibulele Holweni	(substituted on) 90+15'
Manager:
Desiree Ellis

GK	22	Francesca Durante
RB	4	Lucia Di Guglielmo	(substituted off) 64'
CB	5	Elena Linari
CB	3	Benedetta Orsi	(substituted off) 90+10'
LB	17	Lisa Boattin
CM	6	Manuela Giugliano
CM	18	Arianna Caruso	(substituted off) 83'
RW	14	Chiara Beccari	(substituted off) 83'
AM	16	Giulia Dragoni
LW	8	Barbara Bonansea (c)	(substituted off) 64'
CF	9	Valentina Giacinti
Substitutions:
FW	10	Cristiana Girelli	(substituted on) 64'
DF	13	Elisa Bartoli	(substituted on) 64'
MF	20	Giada Greggi	(substituted on) 83'
FW	7	Sofia Cantore	(substituted on) 83'
FW	11	Benedetta Glionna	(substituted on) 90+10'
Manager:
Milena Bertolini

Player of the Match:
Hildah Magaia (South Africa)

Assistant referees:
Leslie Vásquez (Chile)
Mónica Amboya (Ecuador)
Fourth official:
Myriam Marcotte (Canada)
Video assistant referee:
Nicolás Gallo (Colombia)
Assistant video assistant referee:
Armando Villarreal (United States)
Offside video assistant referee:
Enedina Caudillo (Mexico)

== Discipline ==
Fair play points would have been used as tiebreakers in the group should the overall and head-to-head records of teams were tied. These were calculated based on yellow and red cards received in all group matches as follows:

- first yellow card: minus 1 point;
- indirect red card (second yellow card): minus 3 points;
- direct red card: minus 4 points;
- yellow card and direct red card: minus 5 points;

Only one of the above deductions was applied to a player in a single match.

Team	Match 1				Match 2				Match 3				Points
Team	Booked	(yellow card) (yellow-red card)	Sent off (straight red)	(yellow card) (red card)	Booked	(yellow card) (yellow-red card)	Sent off (straight red)	(yellow card) (red card)	Booked	(yellow card) (yellow-red card)	Sent off (straight red)	(yellow card) (red card)	Points
Italy	2												−2
Sweden									2				−2
South Africa	2				2								−4
Argentina	4				1				1				−6

== See also ==
- Argentina at the FIFA Women's World Cup
- Italy at the FIFA Women's World Cup
- South Africa at the FIFA Women's World Cup
- Sweden at the FIFA Women's World Cup
