= South Africa at the FIFA Women's World Cup =

The South Africa women's national football team has represented South Africa at the FIFA Women's World Cup on two occasions, in 2019 and 2023.

On August 2, 2023, South Africa beat Italy 3–2 to qualify for the Round of 16. This was the first World Cup victory for the women's team, and also the first time in South Africa's history that either the women's or men's team has qualified out of the group stage.

== FIFA Women's World Cup record ==
World Cup Finals
Year	Result	GP	W	D*	L	GF	GA	GD
(China) 1991	Did not enter							
(Sweden) 1995	Did not qualify							
(United States) 1999	Did not qualify							
(United States) 2003	Did not qualify							
(China) 2007	Did not qualify							
(Germany) 2011	Did not qualify							
(Canada) 2015	Did not qualify							
(France) 2019	Group stage	3	0	0	3	1	8	–7
(Australia) (New Zealand) 2023	Round of 16	4	1	1	2	6	8	–2
(Brazil) 2027	To be determined							
(Costa Rica) (Jamaica) (Mexico) (United States) 2031	To be determined							
(United Kingdom) 2035	To be determined							
Total	2/12	7	1	1	5	7	16	–9

FIFA Women's World Cup history
Year	Round	Date	Opponent	Result	Stadium
(France) 2019	Group stage	8 June	Spain	L 1–3	Stade Océane, Le Havre
(France) 2019	Group stage	13 June	China	L 0–1	Parc des Princes, Paris
(France) 2019	Group stage	17 June	Germany	L 0–4	Stade de la Mosson, Montpellier
(Australia) (New Zealand) 2023	Group Stage	23 July	Sweden	L 1–2	Wellington Regional Stadium, Wellington
(Australia) (New Zealand) 2023	Group Stage	28 July	Argentina	D 2–2	Forsyth Barr Stadium, Dunedin
(Australia) (New Zealand) 2023	Group Stage	2 August	Italy	W 3–2	Wellington Regional Stadium, Wellington
(Australia) (New Zealand) 2023	Round of 16	6 August	Netherlands	L 0–2	Sydney Football Stadium, Sydney

== 2019 FIFA Women's World Cup ==
=== Group B ===
Pos	Team	Pld	W	D	L	GF	GA	GD	Pts	Qualification
1	Germany	3	3	0	0	6	0	+6	9	Advance to knockout stage
2	Spain	3	1	1	1	3	2	+1	4	Advance to knockout stage
3	China	3	1	1	1	1	1	0	4	Advance to knockout stage
4	South Africa	3	0	0	3	1	8	−7	0	

Source: FIFA
Rules for classification: Group stage tiebreakers
8 June 2019
18:00

Spain	3–1	South Africa
Hermoso 69' (pen.), 82' (pen.); L. García 89'	Report	Kgatlana 25'

Stade Océane, Le Havre
Attendance: 12,044
Referee: María Carvajal (Chile)

13 June 2019
21:00

South Africa	0–1	China
	Report	Li Ying 40'

Parc des Princes, Paris
Attendance: 20,011
Referee: Katalin Kulcsár (Hungary)

17 June 2019
18:00

South Africa	0–4	Germany
	Report	Leupolz 14'; Däbritz 29'; Popp 40'; Magull 58'

Stade de la Mosson, Montpellier
Attendance: 15,502
Referee: Sandra Braz (Portugal)

== 2023 FIFA Women's World Cup ==
=== Group G ===
Pos	Team	Pld	W	D	L	GF	GA	GD	Pts	Qualification
1	Sweden	3	3	0	0	9	1	+8	9	Advance to knockout stage
2	South Africa	3	1	1	1	6	6	0	4	Advance to knockout stage
3	Italy	3	1	0	2	3	8	−5	3	
4	Argentina	3	0	1	2	2	5	−3	1	

Source: FIFA
Rules for classification: Group stage tiebreakers
23 July 2023
17:00 UTC+12

Sweden	2–1	South Africa
Rolfö 65'; Ilestedt 90'	Report	Magaia 48'

Wellington Regional Stadium, Wellington
Attendance: 18,317
Referee: Ekaterina Koroleva (United States)

28 July 2023
12:00 UTC+12

Argentina	2–2	South Africa
Braun 74'; Núñez 79'	Report	Motlhalo 30'; Kgatlana 66'

Forsyth Barr Stadium, Dunedin
Attendance: 8,834
Referee: Anna-Marie Keighley (New Zealand)

2 August 2023
19:00 UTC+12

South Africa	3–2	Italy
Orsi 32' (o.g.); Magaia 67'; Kgatlana 90+2'	Report	Caruso 11' (pen.), 74'

Wellington Regional Stadium, Wellington
Attendance: 14,967
Referee: María Carvajal (Chile)

=== Round of 16 ===
6 August 2023
12:00 UTC+10

Netherlands	2–0	South Africa
Roord 9'; Beerensteyn 68'	Report

Sydney Football Stadium, Sydney
Attendance: 40,233
Referee: Yoshimi Yamashita (Japan)

== Goalscorers ==
Player	Goals	2019	2023
Thembi Kgatlana	3	1	2
Hildah Magaia	2		2
Linda Motlhalo	1		1
Own goals	1		1
Total	7	1	6

== Head-to-head record ==
Opponent	Pld	W	D	L	GF	GA	GD	Win %
Argentina	1	0	1	0	2	2	+0	0.00
China	1	0	0	1	0	1	−1	0.00
Germany	1	0	0	1	0	4	−4	0.00
Italy	1	1	0	0	3	2	+1	100.00
Netherlands	1	0	0	1	0	2	−2	0.00
Spain	1	0	0	1	1	3	−2	0.00
Sweden	1	0	0	1	1	2	−1	0.00
Total	7	1	1	5	7	16	−9	14.29
