= 2023 FIFA Women's World Cup officials =

FIFA officially published the list of match officials (referees, assistant referees, and video assistant referees) who would officiate at the 2023 FIFA Women's World Cup in Australia and New Zealand.

After VAR reviews, the referees at the tournament gave explanations that were broadcast in the stadium and on television as part of a year-long trial of the technique intended to give more transparency to often-controversial decisions. Other sports with video referees already used the measure, with FIFA also having implemented it at the 2022 FIFA Club World Cup and 2023 FIFA U-20 World Cup.

== Referees and assistant referees ==
In January 2023, the FIFA Referees Committee announced the list of 33 referees, 55 assistant referees from all six confederations for the Women's World Cup. Of the 33 referees, FIFA included 2 each from Australia, Canada, South Korea, and the United States.

Confederation	Referees	Assistants	Matches assigned	Fourth official
AFC	Kate Jacewicz (Australia)	Kim Kyoung-min (South Korea); Joanna Charaktis (Australia)	France–Brazil (Group F); Colombia–Jamaica (Round of 16)	
AFC	Kim Yu-jeong (South Korea)			Spain–Costa Rica (Group C); Sweden–South Africa (Group G); New Zealand–Philippines (Group A); United States–Netherlands (Group E); Costa Rica–Zambia (Group C); Argentina–Sweden (Group G)
AFC	Oh Hyeon-jeong (South Korea)	Lee Seul-gi (South Korea); Park Mi-suk (South Korea)	Spain–Zambia (Group C)	England–Denmark (Group D); Netherlands–South Africa (Round of 16); England–Colombia (Quarter-finals)
AFC	Oh Hyeon-jeong (South Korea)	Park Mi-suk (South Korea); Makoto Bozono (Japan)	Haiti–Denmark (Group D)	England–Denmark (Group D); Netherlands–South Africa (Round of 16); England–Colombia (Quarter-finals)
AFC	Casey Reibelt (Australia)	Ramina Tsoi (Kyrgyzstan); Xie Lijun (China)	Spain–Costa Rica (Group C)	Sweden vs United States (Round of 16)
AFC	Casey Reibelt (Australia)	Ramina Tsoi (Kyrgyzstan); Heba Saadieh (Palestine)	China–England (Group D)	Sweden vs United States (Round of 16)
AFC	Yoshimi Yamashita (Japan)	Makoto Bozono (Japan); Naomi Teshirogi (Japan)	New Zealand–Norway (Group A); United States–Netherlands (Group E); Netherlands–South Africa (Round of 16)	Germany–Colombia (Group H); Spain–England (Final)
CAF	Vincentia Amedome (Togo)	Carine Atezambong Fomo (Cameroon); Fanta Kone (Mali)	Philippines–Switzerland (Group A)	Jamaica–Brazil (Group F)
CAF	Bouchra Karboubi (Morocco)	Fatiha Jermoumi (Morocco); Soukaina Hamdi (Morocco)	United States–Vietnam (Group E); Costa Rica–Zambia (Group C)	
CAF	Akhona Makalima (South Africa)			Denmark–China (Group D); Germany–Morocco (Group H); Canada–Republic of Ireland (Group B); Panama–Jamaica (Group F); Haiti–Denmark (Group D); Morocco–Colombia (Group H)
CAF	Salima Mukansanga (Rwanda)	Queency Victoire (Mauritius); Mary Njoroge (Kenya)	Portugal–Vietnam (Group E); Argentina–Sweden (Group G)	
CONCACAF	Marianela Araya (Costa Rica)			England–Haiti (Group D); Colombia–South Korea (Group H); China–Haiti (Group D); South Korea–Morocco (Group H); China–England (Group D)
CONCACAF	Marie-Soleil Beaudoin (Canada)	Chantal Boudreau (Canada); Stephanie Yee Sing (Jamaica)	Denmark–China (Group D); Norway–Philippines (Group A)	Australia–Denmark (Round of 16)
CONCACAF	Melissa Borjas (Honduras)	Shirley Perelló (Honduras); Sandra Ramírez (Mexico)	Italy–Argentina (Group G); Germany–Colombia (Group H); England–Nigeria (Round of 16)	Spain–Sweden (Semi-finals)
CONCACAF	Katia García (Mexico)	Karen Díaz Medina (Mexico); Enedina Caudillo (Mexico)	New Zealand–Philippines (Group A); Republic of Ireland–Nigeria (Group B)	Japan–Norway (Round of 16); Japan–Sweden (Quarter-finals)
CONCACAF	Ekaterina Koroleva (United States)	Kathryn Nesbitt (United States); Felisha Mariscal (United States)	Sweden–South Africa (Group G); Japan–Spain (Group C); England–Colombia (Quarter-finals)	
CONCACAF	Myriam Marcotte (Canada)			Philippines–Switzerland (Group A); Netherlands–Portugal (Group E); Japan–Costa Rica (Group C); Sweden–Italy Group G); Japan–Spain (Group C); South Africa–Italy (Group G)
CONCACAF	Tori Penso (United States)	Brooke Mayo (United States); Mijensa Rensch (Suriname)	Germany–Morocco (Group H); Switzerland–New Zealand (Group A); France–Morocco (Round of 16); Australia–England (Semi-finals)	
CONCACAF	Tori Penso (United States)	Brooke Mayo (United States); Kathryn Nesbitt (United States)	Spain–England (Final)	
CONMEBOL	Edina Alves Batista (Brazil)	Neuza Back (Brazil); Leila Moreira da Cruz (Brazil)	Australia–Republic of Ireland (Group B); South Korea–Morocco (Group H); Japan–Norway (Round of 16); Spain–Sweden (Semi-finals)	
CONMEBOL	Emikar Calderas (Venezuela)	Migdalia Rodríguez Chirino (Venezuela); Mary Blanco Bolívar (Colombia)	England–Haiti (Group D)	Panama–France (Group F); England–Nigeria (Round of 16)
CONMEBOL	María Carvajal (Chile)	Leslie Vásquez (Chile); Loreto Toloza (Chile)	France–Jamaica (Group F)	Australia–Republic of Ireland (Group B)
CONMEBOL	María Carvajal (Chile)	Leslie Vásquez (Chile); Mónica Amboya (Ecuador)	South Africa–Italy (Group G); Australia–France (Quarter-finals)	Australia–Republic of Ireland (Group B)
CONMEBOL	Anahí Fernández (Uruguay)			Zambia–Japan (Group C); Switzerland–Norway (Group A); Portugal–Vietnam (Group E); Norway–Philippines (Group A); Portugal–United States (Group E)
CONMEBOL	Laura Fortunato (Argentina)	Mariana de Almeida (Argentina); Daiana Milone (Argentina)	Canada–Republic of Ireland (Group B); Panama–France (Group F)	France–Jamaica (Group F); Australia–France (Quarter-finals)
OFC	Anna-Marie Keighley (New Zealand)	Sarah Jones (New Zealand); Maria Salamasina (Samoa)	Argentina–South Africa (Group G); South Korea–Germany (Group H)	France–Morocco (Round of 16)
UEFA	Iuliana Demetrescu (Romania)			Nigeria–Canada (Group B); Brazil–Panama (Group F); Argentina–South Africa (Group G); Switzerland–New Zealand (Group A); Vietnam–Netherlands (Group E)
UEFA	Maria Sole Ferrieri Caputi (Italy)	Francesca Di Monte (Italy); Mihaela Tepusa (Romania)	Japan–Costa Rica (Group C); Morocco–Colombia (Group H)	Spain–Netherlands (Quarter-finals)
UEFA	Cheryl Foster (Wales)	Michelle O'Neill (Republic of Ireland); Franca Overtoom (Netherlands)	Brazil–Panama (Group F); Sweden–Italy (Group G); Switzerland–Spain (Round of 16); Sweden–Australia (Third place play-off)	
UEFA	Stéphanie Frappart (France)	Manuela Nicolosi (France); Elodie Coppola (France)	Switzerland–Norway (Group A); Canada–Australia (Group B); Sweden–United States (Round of 16); Spain–Netherlands (Quarter-finals)	
UEFA	Marta Huerta de Aza (Spain)	Guadalupe Porras Ayuso (Spain); Sanja Rođak-Karšić (Croatia)	China–Haiti (Group D)	South Korea–Germany (Group H); Colombia–Jamaica (Round of 16)
UEFA	Lina Lehtovaara (Finland)	Chrysoula Kourompylia (Greece); Karolin Kaivoja (Estonia)	Nigeria–Canada (Group B)	Australia–Nigeria (Group B); France–Brazil (Group F); Republic of Ireland–Nigeria (Group B)
UEFA	Ivana Martinčić (Croatia)	Sanja Rođak-Karšić (Croatia); Karolin Kaivoja (Estonia)	Vietnam–Netherlands (Group E)	New Zealand–Norway (Group A); United States–Vietnam (Group E); Italy–Argentina (Group G); Spain–Zambia (Group C); Switzerland–Spain (Round of 16)
UEFA	Kateryna Monzul (Ukraine)	Maryna Striletska (Ukraine); Paulina Baranowska (Poland)	Netherlands–Portugal (Group E); Panama–Jamaica (Group F)	
UEFA	Tess Olofsson (Sweden)	Lucie Ratajová (Czech Republic); Polyxeni Irodotou (Cyprus)	Zambia–Japan (Group C); England–Denmark (Group D)	Canada–Australia (Group B); Australia–England (Semi-finals)
UEFA	Esther Staubli (Switzerland)	Katrin Rafalski (Germany); Susanne Küng (Switzerland)	Australia–Nigeria (Group B); Jamaica–Brazil (Group F); Japan–Sweden (Quarter-finals)	
UEFA	Rebecca Welch (England)	Natalie Aspinall (England); Anita Vad (Hungary)	Colombia–South Korea (Group H); Portugal–United States (Group E); Australia–Denmark (Round of 16)	Sweden–Australia (Third place play-off)

== Video assistant referees ==
On 9 January 2023, FIFA announced 19 video assistant referees (VARs) had been appointed. For the first time in the Women's World Cup, the FIFA Referees Committee had appointed six female video assistant referees.

Video assistant referees
Confederation	Video assistant referee
AFC	Abdulla Al-Marri (Qatar)
AFC	Muhammad Taqi (Singapore)
CAF	Adil Zourak (Morocco)
CONCACAF	Carol Anne Chénard (Canada)
CONCACAF	Drew Fischer (Canada)
CONCACAF	Tatiana Guzmán (Nicaragua)
CONCACAF	Armando Villarreal (United States)
CONMEBOL	Salomé di Iorio (Argentina)
CONMEBOL	Nicolás Gallo (Colombia)
CONMEBOL	Daiane Muniz dos Santos (Brazil)
CONMEBOL	Juan Soto (Venezuela)
UEFA	Ella De Vries (Belgium)
UEFA	Marco Fritz (Germany)
UEFA	Alejandro Hernández Hernández (Spain)
UEFA	Massimiliano Irrati (Italy)
UEFA	Juan Martínez Munuera (Spain)
UEFA	Sian Massey-Ellis (England)
UEFA	Pol van Boekel (Netherlands)
