= Zoë October =

South African soccer player (born 2008)

Personal information
- Date of birth: 16 June 2008 (age 18)
- Positions: Forward; midfielder

Team information
- Current team: Western Cape University

Youth career
- 2017–2021: Bellstar United

Senior career*
Years	Team	Apps	(Gls)
2021–2026	Cape Town Spurs		
2026–	Western Cape University		

International career^{‡}
2024–2025	South Africa U17		
2026–	South Africa U20		
2026–	South Africa		
- * Club domestic league appearances and goals as of 6 September 2026 ‡ National team caps and goals as of 6 September 2026

Zoë October (Afrikaans: [ˈzuːə]; born 16 June 2008) is a South African soccer player who plays as a forward or attacking midfielder for SAFA Women's League (SWL) club University of the Western Cape (UWC) and the South Africa national team. She previously played for SAFA Provincial Women's League (SPWL) club Cape Town Spurs and represented South Africa at under-17 and under-20 level. Renowned for her dribbling and technical ability, she is regarded as a rising star in South African women's soccer.

== Early life ==
October was born on 16 October 2008 in the Western Cape province of South Africa. She grew up in the suburb of Delft in Cape Town's Northern Suburbs, and attended high school at Rosendaal High School in nearby Rosendal. She is Christian, and has credited God for her bravery and talent.

October began playing soccer at the age of nine, when she joined her junior club Bellstar United in the suburb of Belhar, where she was the youngest on the team. She is a supporter of Manchester United, and dreams of one day playing for the club and for the South Africa national team (Banyana Banyana). She has described Portuguese forward Cristiano Ronaldo as an inspiration and a role model.

== Club career ==
=== Cape Town Spurs ===
October signed her first senior contract at just 12 years old, signing for SAFA Women's Provincial League (SAWPL) club Cape Town Spurs ahead of the 2021 season after being recruited by coach Winston Zeederberg from her youth club Bellstar United following impressive performances with them at the 2019 Cup of Dreams. She won both Midfielder of the Tournament and Player of the Tournament in the women's under-20 division of that year's edition of the ENGEN Knockout Challenge.

=== University of the Western Cape ===
After five seasons in the second division, October signed her first top division contract for SAFA Women's League (SAWL) club University of the Western Cape (UWC) ahead of the 2026 season. She made her début on 23 May 2026 in a league away match against TS Galaxy Queens, in which she came on as a substitute in the second half and scored an equalising header in a 2–2 draw at UJ Soweto Stadium in Soweto, Johannesburg, Gauteng.

== International career ==
=== South Africa U17 ===
October was first selected by head coach Nthabeleng Modiko for the South Africa under-17 national team for their two-legged second round qualifier for the 2024 FIFA U-17 Women's World Cup in the Dominican Republic, in which they faced Ethiopia on 4 and 10 February 2024. She was named on the bench in the first leg, which resulted in a 3–0 loss away at Adebe Bikila Stadium in Addis Ababa, Ethiopia. After a 0–0 draw in the second leg at home at Lucas Moripe Stadium in Pretoria, Gauteng, South Africa, South Africa were eliminated from the tournament after Ethiopia won 3–0 on aggregate and advanced to the third round.

=== South Africa U20 ===
October received her first call-up from head coach Maude Khumalo for the South Africa under-20 national team for a two-legged third round qualifier for the 2026 FIFA U-20 Women's World Cup in Poland against Ghana on 9 and 14 February 2026. She scored her first international goal in the first leg, scoring the first equaliser in a 2–2 draw away at Accra Sports Stadium in Accra, Ghana. In the second leg, South Africa suffered a 1–0 loss at home at Mbombela Stadium in Mbombela, Mpumalanga, South Africa, thus being eliminated after Ghana advanced with a 3–2 victory on aggregate.

=== South Africa ===
October received her first call-up for the South Africa senior national team when head coach Desiree Ellis selected her as part of the 23-player squad that the country sent to the 2025 COSAFA Women's Championship on home soil in Polokwane and Seshego in Limpopo. South Africa finished runners-up to Namibia.

October received her first call-up for a major tournament when Ellis selected her as part of the team's 26-player squad for the 2026 Women's Africa Cup of Nations in Morocco. She was the youngest player at the tournament, aged 18 years and 40 days old. At the tournament, South Africa finished runners-up in Group B before being eliminated in the quarter-finals, but advanced to the interconfederation playoffs for the 2027 FIFA Women's World Cup in Brazil.
