= Ōsako =

Ōsako, Osako, Oosako, Ousako or Ohsako (written: 大迫) is a Japanese surname. Notable people with the surname include:

- Akinobu Osako (大迫 明伸, born 1960), Japanese judoka
- Keisuke Osako (大迫 敬介, born 1999), Japanese footballer
- Nozomi Osako (大迫 希, born 1990), Japanese footballer
- Ōsako Naoharu (大迫 尚敏, 1844–1927), Imperial Japanese Army general
- Ōsako Naomichi (大迫 尚道, 1854–1934), Imperial Japanese Army general
- Suguru Osako (大迫 傑, born 1991), Japanese long-distance runner
- Tatsuo Osako (大迫 辰雄)
- Tatsuko Ohsako (大迫 たつ子, born 1952), Japanese golfer
- Yuya Osako (大迫 勇也, born 1990), Japanese footballer
