= Portugal at the FIFA Women's World Cup =

FIFA Women's World Cup

Portugal has qualified for the FIFA Women's World Cup in one occasion, the 2023 FIFA Women's World Cup.

== FIFA Women's World Cup overviews ==
=== FIFA Women's World Cup ===
World Cup Finals
| Year | Result | GP | W | D | L | GS | GA | GD |
|---|---|---|---|---|---|---|---|---|
| (China) 1991 | Did not enter | | | | | | | |
| (Sweden) 1995 | Did not qualify | | | | | | | |
| (United States) 1999 | Did not qualify | | | | | | | |
| (United States) 2003 | Did not qualify | | | | | | | |
| (China) 2007 | Did not qualify | | | | | | | |
| (Germany) 2011 | Did not qualify | | | | | | | |
| (Canada) 2015 | Did not qualify | | | | | | | |
| (France) 2019 | Did not qualify | | | | | | | |
| (Australia) (New Zealand) 2023 | Group stage | 3 | 1 | 1 | 1 | 2 | 1 | 1 |
| (Brazil) 2027 | To be determined | | | | | | | |
| (Costa Rica) (Jamaica) (Mexico) (United States) 2031 | To be determined | | | | | | | |
| (United Kingdom) 2035 | To be determined | | | | | | | |
| Total | 1/12 | 3 | 1 | 1 | 1 | 2 | 1 | 1 |

== Participation history ==
=== 2023 FIFA Women's World Cup ===
==== group E ====
| Pos | Team | Pld | W | D | L | GF | GA | GD | Pts | Qualification |
|---|---|---|---|---|---|---|---|---|---|---|
| 1 | Netherlands | 3 | 2 | 1 | 0 | 9 | 1 | +8 | 7 | Advance to knockout stage |
| 2 | United States | 3 | 1 | 2 | 0 | 4 | 1 | +3 | 5 | Advance to knockout stage |
| 3 | Portugal | 3 | 1 | 1 | 1 | 2 | 1 | +1 | 4 | |
| 4 | Vietnam | 3 | 0 | 0 | 3 | 0 | 12 | −12 | 0 | |

Source: FIFA
Rules for classification: Group stage tiebreakers
23 July 2023
19:30 UTC+12

| Netherlands | 1–0 | Portugal |
|---|---|---|
| Van der Gragt 13' | Report |

Forsyth Barr Stadium, Dunedin
Attendance: 11,991
Referee: Kateryna Monzul (Ukraine)

27 July 2023
19:30 UTC+12

| Portugal | 2–0 | Vietnam |
|---|---|---|
| Encarnação 7'; Nazareth 21' | Report |

Waikato Stadium, Hamilton
Attendance: 6,645
Referee: Salima Mukansanga (Rwanda)

1 August 2023
19:00 UTC+12

| Portugal | 0–0 | United States |
|---|---|---|
| | Report |

Eden Park, Auckland
Attendance: 42,958
Referee: Rebecca Welch (England)

== Record by opponent ==
| Opponent | Pld | W | D | L | GF | GA | GD | Win % |
|---|---|---|---|---|---|---|---|---|
| Netherlands | 1 | 0 | 0 | 1 | 0 | 1 | −1 | 0.00 |
| United States | 1 | 0 | 1 | 0 | 0 | 0 | +0 | 0.00 |
| Vietnam | 1 | 1 | 0 | 0 | 2 | 0 | +2 | 100.00 |
| Total | 3 | 1 | 1 | 1 | 2 | 1 | +1 | 33.33 |

== Goalscorers ==
| Player | Goals | 2023 |
|---|---|---|
| Telma Encarnação | 1 | 1 |
| Francisca Nazareth | 1 | 1 |
| Total | 2 | 2 |
