= Vietnam at the FIFA Women's World Cup =

FIFA Women's World Cup

Vietnam has qualified to the FIFA Women's World Cup in one occasion, the 2023 FIFA Women's World Cup which will also be the country's debut.

Although Vietnam has been well-established in women's football among Asia's middle forces, it has missed out the golden chance during the 2014 AFC Women's Asian Cup at home, losing to Thailand 1–2 (which also helped Thailand to debut in the Women's World Cup). After that missed opportunity, Vietnam entered its second playoff campaign in the 2022 AFC Women's Asian Cup playoffs, again grouped with Thailand and Chinese Taipei; this time, Vietnam triumphed in the playoffs to finally book a place in Australia/New Zealand 2023 edition, for the first time ever.

== Australia/New Zealand 2023 ==
After qualifying for its debut Women's World Cup in 2023, Vietnam was drawn into a "group of death" with both finalists from the previous tournament, the United States and the Netherlands. In February, Portugal joined the group by winning an inter-confederation play-off. Vietnam had no previous experience against any of its three opponents.

=== Group E ===
Pos	Team	Pld	W	D	L	GF	GA	GD	Pts	Qualification
1	Netherlands	3	2	1	0	9	1	+8	7	Advance to knockout stage
2	United States	3	1	2	0	4	1	+3	5	Advance to knockout stage
3	Portugal	3	1	1	1	2	1	+1	4	
4	Vietnam	3	0	0	3	0	12	−12	0	

Source: FIFA
22 July 2023
13:00 UTC+12

United States	3–0	Vietnam
Smith 14', 45+7'; Horan 77'	Report

Eden Park, Auckland
Attendance: 41,107
Referee: Bouchra Karboubi (Morocco)

27 July 2023
19:30 UTC+12

Portugal	2–0	Vietnam
Encarnação 7'; Nazareth 21'	Report

Waikato Stadium, Hamilton
Attendance: 6,645
Referee: Salima Mukansanga (Rwanda)

1 August 2023
19:00 UTC+12

Vietnam	0–7	Netherlands
	Report	Martens 8'; Snoeijs 11'; Brugts 18', 57'; Roord 23', 83'; Van de Donk 45'

Forsyth Barr Stadium, Dunedin
Attendance: 8,215
Referee: Ivana Martinčić (Croatia)

== FIFA Women's World Cup record ==
World Cup Finals
Year	Result	GP	W	D*	L	GS	GA	GD
(China) 1991	Did not enter							
(Sweden) 1995	Did not enter							
(United States) 1999	Did not enter							
(United States) 2003	Did not qualify							
(China) 2007	Did not qualify							
(Germany) 2011	Did not qualify							
(Canada) 2015	Did not qualify							
(France) 2019	Did not qualify							
(Australia) (New Zealand) 2023	Group stage	3	0	0	3	0	12	–12
(Brazil) 2027	Did not qualify							
(Costa Rica) (Jamaica) (Mexico) (United States) 2031	To be determined							
(United Kingdom) 2035	To be determined							
Total	1/12	3	0	0	3	0	12	–12

== Head-to-head record ==
Opponent	Pld	W	D	L	GF	GA	GD	Win %
Netherlands	1	0	0	1	0	7	−7	0.00
Portugal	1	0	0	1	0	2	−2	0.00
United States	1	0	0	1	0	3	−3	0.00
Total	3	0	0	3	0	12	−12	0.00

== Goalscorers ==
Player	Goals	2023
Total	0	0
