= 2023 FIFA Women's World Cup Group E =

Football tournament teams

Group E of the 2023 FIFA Women's World Cup was one of eight groups that formed the opening round of the tournament with the matches played from 22 July to 1 August 2023. The group consisted of defending world champions the United States, Vietnam, the Netherlands and Portugal. The top two teams, the Netherlands and the United States (both finalists in 2019), advanced to the round of 16.

The United States finished as group runners-up for only the second time in the tournament's history, and the first since 2011, the most recent Women's World Cup without the Netherlands participating. The five points they earned was their lowest ever in a Women's World Cup group stage, having won at least two group games in all previous tournaments (including 1991 when only two points were awarded for a win). Debutants Vietnam were eliminated without scoring a single goal, finishing bottom of the group with zero points and twelve goals conceded.

== Teams ==
Draw position	Team	Pot	Confederation	Method of qualification	Date of qualification	Finals appearance	Last appearance	Previous best performance	FIFA Rankings	
Draw position	Team	Pot	Confederation	Method of qualification	Date of qualification	Finals appearance	Last appearance	Previous best performance	October 2022 (Note: The rankings of October 2022 were used for seeding for the final draw.)	June 2023
E1	United States	1	CONCACAF	2022 CONCACAF W Championship champions	7 July 2022	9th	2019	Winners (1991, 1999, 2015, 2019)	1	1
E2	Vietnam	3	AFC	2022 AFC Women's Asian Cup play-off winners	6 February 2022	1st	—	Debut	34	32
E3	Netherlands	2	UEFA	UEFA Group C winners	6 September 2022	3rd	2019	Runners-up (2019)	8	9
E4	Portugal	4 (Note: As the identity of the inter-confederation play-off Group A winners was not known at the time of the final draw, positions in the FIFA Rankings were not taken into account, and the placeholder in the draw was automatically seeded into pot 4.)	UEFA	Inter-confederation play-off Group A winners	22 February 2023	1st	—	Debut	23	21

== Standings ==
Pos	Team	Pld	W	D	L	GF	GA	GD	Pts	Qualification
1	Netherlands	3	2	1	0	9	1	+8	7	Advance to knockout stage
2	United States	3	1	2	0	4	1	+3	5	Advance to knockout stage
3	Portugal	3	1	1	1	2	1	+1	4	
4	Vietnam	3	0	0	3	0	12	−12	0	

Source: FIFA
Rules for classification: Group stage tiebreakers

In the round of 16:

- The winners of Group E, the Netherlands, advanced to play the runners-up of Group G, South Africa.
- The runners-up of Group E, the United States, advanced to play the winners of Group G, Sweden.

== Matches ==
All times listed are local, NZST (UTC+12).

=== United States vs Vietnam ===
22 July 2023
13:00

United States	3–0	Vietnam
Smith 14', 45+7'; Horan 77'	Report

Eden Park, Auckland
Attendance: 41,107
Referee: Bouchra Karboubi (Morocco)

United States	Vietnam

GK	1	Alyssa Naeher
RB	23	Emily Fox		(substituted off) 84'
CB	8	Julie Ertz
CB	4	Naomi Girma
LB	19	Crystal Dunn		(substituted off) 84'
DM	17	Andi Sullivan
CM	9	Savannah DeMelo		(substituted off) 61'
CM	10	Lindsey Horan (c)	(yellow card) 56'
RF	20	Trinity Rodman		(substituted off) 76'
CF	13	Alex Morgan		(substituted off) 61'
LF	11	Sophia Smith
Substitutions:
MF	16	Rose Lavelle		(substituted on) 61'
FW	15	Megan Rapinoe		(substituted on) 61'
FW	7	Alyssa Thompson		(substituted on) 76'
DF	3	Sofia Huerta		(substituted on) 84'
DF	5	Kelley O'Hara		(substituted on) 84'
Manager:
(North Macedonia) Vlatko Andonovski

GK	14	Trần Thị Kim Thanh
CB	2	Lương Thị Thu Thương		(substituted off) 61'
CB	13	Lê Thị Diễm My
CB	4	Trần Thị Thu
RWB	17	Trần Thị Thu Thảo
LWB	5	Hoàng Thị Loan
RM	23	Nguyễn Thị Bích Thùy		(substituted off) 61'
CM	10	Trần Thị Hải Linh		(substituted off) 89'
CM	11	Thái Thị Thảo
LM	7	Nguyễn Thị Tuyết Dung		(substituted off) 46'
CF	9	Huỳnh Như (c)	(yellow card) 76'	(substituted off) 76'
Substitutions:
MF	21	Ngân Thị Vạn Sự		(substituted on) 46'
DF	22	Nguyễn Thị Mỹ Anh		(substituted on) 61'
DF	3	Chương Thị Kiều		(substituted on) 61'
FW	12	Phạm Hải Yến		(substituted on) 76'
MF	16	Dương Thị Vân		(substituted on) 89'
Manager:
Mai Đức Chung

Player of the Match:
Sophia Smith (United States)

Assistant referees:
Fatiha Jermoumi (Morocco)
Soukaina Hamdi (Morocco)
Fourth official:
Ivana Martinčić (Croatia)
Video assistant referee:
Juan Martínez Munuera (Spain)
Assistant video assistant referee:
Ella De Vries (Belgium)
Offside video assistant referee:
Michelle O'Neill (Republic of Ireland)

=== Netherlands vs Portugal ===
23 July 2023
19:30

Netherlands	1–0	Portugal
Van der Gragt 13'	Report

Forsyth Barr Stadium, Dunedin
Attendance: 11,991
Referee: Kateryna Monzul (Ukraine)

Netherlands	Portugal

GK	1	Daphne van Domselaar
CB	8	Sherida Spitse (c)
CB	3	Stefanie van der Gragt
CB	20	Dominique Janssen
RM	17	Victoria Pelova		(substituted off) 90+4'
CM	6	Jill Roord
CM	14	Jackie Groenen
CM	10	Daniëlle van de Donk	(yellow card) 78'	(substituted off) 80'
LM	22	Esmee Brugts
CF	7	Lineth Beerensteyn		(substituted off) 87'
CF	11	Lieke Martens
Substitutions:
MF	21	Damaris Egurrola		(substituted on) 80'
FW	9	Katja Snoeijs		(substituted on) 87'
MF	18	Kerstin Casparij		(substituted on) 90+4'
Manager:
Andries Jonker

GK	1	Inês Pereira
CB	9	Ana Borges
CB	15	Carole Costa
CB	19	Diana Gomes	(yellow card) 84'
RM	11	Tatiana Pinto
CM	14	Dolores Silva (c)		(substituted off) 67'
CM	13	Fátima Pinto
LM	2	Catarina Amado		(substituted off) 78'
AM	8	Andreia Norton		(substituted off) 78'
CF	10	Jéssica Silva	(yellow card) 56'
CF	16	Diana Silva		(substituted off) 78'
Substitutions:
MF	20	Kika Nazareth		(substituted on) 67'
MF	6	Andreia Jacinto		(substituted on) 78'
FW	23	Telma Encarnação		(substituted on) 78'
DF	3	Lúcia Alves		(substituted on) 78'
Manager:
Francisco Neto

Player of the Match:
Stefanie van der Gragt (Netherlands)

Assistant referees:
Maryna Striletska (Ukraine)
Paulina Baranowska (Poland)
Fourth official:
Myriam Marcotte (Canada)
Video assistant referee:
Drew Fischer (Canada)
Assistant video assistant referee:
Abdulla Al-Marri (Qatar)
Offside video assistant referee:
Joanna Charaktis (Australia)

=== United States vs Netherlands ===
The two teams met at the 2019 final, in which the United States won 2–0.

27 July 2023
13:00

United States	1–1	Netherlands
Horan 62'	Report	Roord 17'

Wellington Regional Stadium, Wellington
Attendance: 27,312
Referee: Yoshimi Yamashita (Japan)

United States	Netherlands

GK	1	Alyssa Naeher
RB	23	Emily Fox
CB	8	Julie Ertz
CB	4	Naomi Girma
LB	19	Crystal Dunn
DM	17	Andi Sullivan
CM	9	Savannah DeMelo		(substituted off) 46'
CM	10	Lindsey Horan (c)
RF	20	Trinity Rodman
CF	13	Alex Morgan
LF	11	Sophia Smith
Substitutions:
MF	16	Rose Lavelle	(yellow card) 51'	(substituted on) 46'
Manager:
(North Macedonia) Vlatko Andonovski

GK	1	Daphne van Domselaar
CB	8	Sherida Spitse (c)
CB	3	Stefanie van der Gragt	(substituted off) 46'
CB	20	Dominique Janssen
RM	17	Victoria Pelova	(substituted off) 86'
CM	6	Jill Roord	(substituted off) 90+4'
CM	14	Jackie Groenen
CM	10	Daniëlle van de Donk
LB	22	Esmee Brugts
CF	9	Katja Snoeijs	(substituted off) 71'
LF	11	Lieke Martens
Substitutions:
DF	4	Aniek Nouwen	(substituted on) 46'
MF	21	Damaris Egurrola	(substituted on) 71'
MF	18	Kerstin Casparij	(substituted on) 86'
FW	13	Renate Jansen	(substituted on) 90+4'
Manager:
Andries Jonker

Player of the Match:
Jill Roord (Netherlands)

Assistant referees:
Makoto Bozono (Japan)
Naomi Teshirogi (Japan)
Fourth official:
Kim Yu-jeong (South Korea)
Video assistant referee:
Juan Soto (Venezuela)
Assistant video assistant referee:
Nicolás Gallo (Colombia)
Offside video assistant referee:
Leslie Vásquez (Chile)

=== Portugal vs Vietnam ===
27 July 2023
19:30

Portugal	2–0	Vietnam
Encarnação 7'; Nazareth 21'	Report

Waikato Stadium, Hamilton
Attendance: 6,645
Referee: Salima Mukansanga (Rwanda)

Portugal	Vietnam

GK	12	Patrícia Morais
CB	9	Ana Borges (c)	(yellow card) 86'
CB	15	Carole Costa
CB	17	Ana Seiça		(substituted off) 90'
RM	3	Lúcia Alves
CM	6	Andreia Jacinto		(substituted off) 90'
CM	11	Tatiana Pinto
LM	5	Joana Marchão
AM	20	Kika Nazareth		(substituted off) 69'
CF	10	Jéssica Silva		(substituted off) 69'
CF	23	Telma Encarnação		(substituted off) 75'
Substitutions:
FW	21	Ana Capeta		(substituted on) 69'
MF	8	Andreia Norton		(substituted on) 69'
FW	18	Carolina Mendes		(substituted on) 75'
MF	7	Ana Rute		(substituted on) 90'
DF	4	Sílvia Rebelo		(substituted on) 90'
Manager:
Francisco Neto

GK	14	Trần Thị Kim Thanh
CB	2	Lương Thị Thu Thương	(substituted off) 72'
CB	13	Lê Thị Diễm My
CB	4	Trần Thị Thu
RWB	17	Trần Thị Thu Thảo
LWB	5	Hoàng Thị Loan
RM	23	Nguyễn Thị Bích Thùy	(substituted off) 64'
CM	16	Dương Thị Vân	(substituted off) 64'
CM	11	Thái Thị Thảo
LM	19	Nguyễn Thị Thanh Nhã
CF	9	Huỳnh Như (c)	(substituted off) 72'
Substitutions:
MF	10	Trần Thị Hải Linh	(substituted on) 64'
MF	21	Ngân Thị Vạn Sự	(substituted on) 64'
DF	3	Chương Thị Kiều	(substituted on) 72'
FW	12	Phạm Hải Yến	(substituted on) 72'
Manager:
Mai Đức Chung

Player of the Match:
Telma Encarnação (Portugal)

Assistant referees:
Queency Victoire (Mauritius)
Mary Njoroge (Kenya)
Fourth official:
Anahí Fernández (Uruguay)
Video assistant referee:
Adil Zourak (Morocco)
Assistant video assistant referee:
Daiane Muniz dos Santos (Brazil)
Offside video assistant referee:
Fatiha Jermoumi (Morocco)

=== Portugal vs United States ===
1 August 2023
19:00

Portugal	0–0	United States
	Report

Eden Park, Auckland
Attendance: 42,958
Referee: Rebecca Welch (England)

Portugal	United States

GK	1	Ines Pereira
RB	9	Ana Borges
CB	19	Diana Gomes	(yellow card) 72'
CB	15	Carole Costa	(yellow card) 56'
LB	2	Catarina Amado	(yellow card) 86'	(substituted off) 89'
DM	14	Dolores Silva (c)
CM	11	Tatiana Pinto
CM	8	Andreia Norton		(substituted off) 81'
AM	20	Kika Nazareth		(substituted off) 62'
CF	10	Jéssica Silva
CF	16	Diana Silva		(substituted off) 89'
Substitutions:
MF	6	Andreia Jacinto		(substituted on) 62'
FW	23	Telma Encarnação		(substituted on) 81'
FW	21	Ana Capeta		(substituted on) 89'
DF	5	Joana Marchão		(substituted on) 89'
Manager:
Francisco Neto

GK	1	Alyssa Naeher
RB	23	Emily Fox
CB	4	Naomi Girma	(yellow card) 81'
CB	8	Julie Ertz
LB	19	Crystal Dunn		(substituted off) 90+7'
DM	17	Andi Sullivan
CM	16	Rose Lavelle	(yellow card) 39'
CM	10	Lindsey Horan (c)		(substituted off) 84'
RF	6	Lynn Williams		(substituted off) 84'
CF	13	Alex Morgan		(substituted off) 90+7'
LF	11	Sophia Smith	(yellow card) 52'	(substituted off) 61'
Substitutions:
FW	15	Megan Rapinoe		(substituted on) 61'
DF	14	Emily Sonnett		(substituted on) 84'
FW	20	Trinity Rodman		(substituted on) 84'
FW	7	Alyssa Thompson		(substituted on) 90+7'
DF	5	Kelley O'Hara		(substituted on) 90+7'
Manager:
(North Macedonia) Vlatko Andonovski

Player of the Match:
Alex Morgan (United States)

Assistant referees:
Natalie Aspinall (England)
Anita Vad (Hungary)
Fourth official:
Anahí Fernández (Uruguay)
Video assistant referee:
Marco Fritz (Germany)
Assistant video assistant referee:
Tatiana Guzmán (Nicaragua)
Offside video assistant referee:
Maryna Striletska (Ukraine)

=== Vietnam vs Netherlands ===
1 August 2023
19:00

Vietnam	0–7	Netherlands
	Report	Martens 8'; Snoeijs 11'; Brugts 18', 57'; Roord 23', 83'; Van de Donk 45'

Forsyth Barr Stadium, Dunedin
Attendance: 8,215
Referee: Ivana Martinčić (Croatia)

Vietnam	Netherlands

GK	14	Trần Thị Kim Thanh		(substituted off) 46'
CB	2	Lương Thị Thu Thương		(substituted off) 28'
CB	13	Lê Thị Diễm My
CB	4	Trần Thị Thu
RWB	17	Trần Thị Thu Thảo
LWB	5	Hoàng Thị Loan		(substituted off) 28'
RM	23	Nguyễn Thị Bích Thùy		(substituted off) 60'
CM	16	Dương Thị Vân	(yellow card) 83'
CM	10	Trần Thị Hải Linh
LM	19	Nguyễn Thị Thanh Nhã
CF	12	Phạm Hải Yến (c)		(substituted off) 60'
Substitutions:
DF	3	Chương Thị Kiều		(substituted on) 28'
DF	22	Nguyễn Thị Mỹ Anh		(substituted on) 28'
GK	20	Khổng Thị Hằng		(substituted on) 46'
MF	7	Nguyễn Thị Tuyết Dung		(substituted on) 60'
FW	9	Huỳnh Như		(substituted on) 60'
Manager:
Mai Đức Chung

GK	1	Daphne van Domselaar
CB	8	Sherida Spitse (c)	(substituted off) 73'
CB	3	Stefanie van der Gragt
CB	20	Dominique Janssen
RM	17	Victoria Pelova	(substituted off) 46'
CM	6	Jill Roord
CM	14	Jackie Groenen	(substituted off) 62'
CM	10	Daniëlle van de Donk	(substituted off) 46'
LM	22	Esmee Brugts	(substituted off) 80'
CF	9	Katja Snoeijs
CF	11	Lieke Martens
Substitutions:
MF	19	Wieke Kaptein	(substituted on) 46'
MF	18	Kerstin Casparij	(substituted on) 46'
MF	21	Damaris Egurrola	(substituted on) 62'
DF	15	Caitlin Dijkstra	(substituted on) 73'
DF	5	Merel van Dongen	(substituted on) 80'
Manager:
Andries Jonker

Player of the Match:
Esmee Brugts (Netherlands)

Assistant referees:
Sanja Rođak-Karšić (Croatia)
Karolin Kaivoja (Estonia)
Fourth official:
Iuliana Demetrescu (Romania)
Video assistant referee:
Carol Anne Chenard (Canada)
Assistant video assistant referee:
Nicolás Gallo (Colombia)
Offside video assistant referee:
Chantal Boudreau (Canada)

== Discipline ==
Fair play points would have been used as tiebreakers in the group should the overall and head-to-head records of teams were tied. These were calculated based on yellow and red cards received in all group matches as follows:

- first yellow card: minus 1 point;
- indirect red card (second yellow card): minus 3 points;
- direct red card: minus 4 points;
- yellow card and direct red card: minus 5 points;

Only one of the above deductions was applied to a player in a single match.

Team	Match 1				Match 2				Match 3				Points
Team	Booked	(yellow card) (yellow-red card)	Sent off (straight red)	(yellow card) (red card)	Booked	(yellow card) (yellow-red card)	Sent off (straight red)	(yellow card) (red card)	Booked	(yellow card) (yellow-red card)	Sent off (straight red)	(yellow card) (red card)	Points
Netherlands	1												–1
Vietnam	1								1				–2
United States	1				1				3				–5
Portugal	2				1				3				–6

== See also ==
- Netherlands at the FIFA Women's World Cup
- Portugal at the FIFA Women's World Cup
- United States at the FIFA Women's World Cup
- Vietnam at the FIFA Women's World Cup
