= Ōsako Naomichi =

Japanese general (1854–1934)

- 大迫 尚道
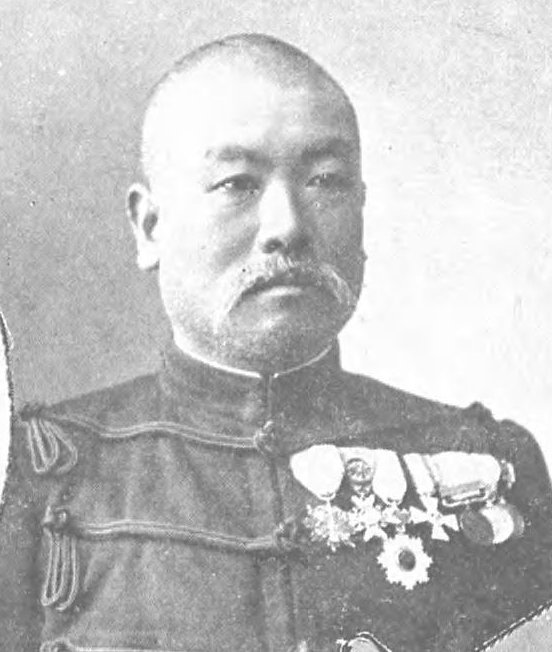
- Born: 6 September 1854; Satsuma Domain, Japan
- Died: 12 September 1934 (aged 80)
- Military career
- Allegiance: Empire of Japan
- Branch: Imperial Japanese Army
- Service years: 1871–1919
- Rank: General
- Conflicts: Satsuma Rebellion; First Sino-Japanese War; Russo-Japanese War

General Ōsako Naomichi

Ōsako Naomichi (大迫 尚道, Naomichi Ōsako; 6 September 1854 – 12 September 1934) was a general in the early Imperial Japanese Army. He was the younger brother of General Ōsako Naoharu.

== Biography ==
Ōsako was born to a samurai family in Satsuma Domain (present day Kagoshima Prefecture). He joined the fledgling Imperial Japanese Army in April 1871, and joined the 2nd class of the predecessor of the Imperial Japanese Army Academy from December 1875. While still a cadet, he was called to active service to fight against his fellow Satsuma clansmen in the Satsuma Rebellion. In February 1879, he was commissioned as a second lieutenant in artillery. From May 1886, he attended the Army Staff College, specializing in artillery. He was sent to Germany for further training from May 1888. After his return to Japan, Ōsako was assigned to the Koishikawa Arsenal. He returned to Germany as a military attache, remaining until July 1893.

Ōsako was appointed battalion commander in the IJA 1st Field Artillery Regiment in February 1894. With the start of the First Sino-Japanese War, he was assigned to the staff of the Japanese First Army. After the end of the war, from October 1896, he was chief-of-staff of the IJA 5th Infantry Division and was promoted to colonel in October 1897. In December 1898, he became chief-of-staff of the IJA 4th Infantry Division. In June 1901, Ōsako was promoted to major general and commander of the IJA 2nd Field Artillery Brigade.

With the start of the Russo-Japanese War, Ōsako participated in the Siege of Port Arthur. He was appointed chief-of-staff of the Japanese Second Army from September 1904. After the end of the war, Ōsako was awarded the Order of the Golden Kite, 2nd class, and was reassigned to the Inspectorate General of Military Training from February 1906. He was promoted to lieutenant general in November 1907 and from November 1910 was the commander of the IJA 18th Infantry Division and from December 1912 was commander of the IJA 4th Infantry Division.

In May 1914, Ōsako was awarded the Grand Cordon of the Order of the Sacred Treasure. From February 1915, he served on the Supreme War Council and was promoted to general in August 1915. In November 1918, he was awarded the Order of the Rising Sun, 1st class. In July 1919, he transferred to the reserves. His grave is at the Tama Cemetery in Tokyo.

== Decorations ==
- 1895 – Order of the Sacred Treasure, 6th class
- 1895 – Order of the Rising Sun, 4th class
- 1901 – Order of the Golden Kite, 4th class
- 1896 – Order of the Sacred Treasure, 5th class
- 1902 – Order of the Sacred Treasure, 4th class
- 1905 – Order of the Sacred Treasure, 3rd class
- 1906 – Order of the Rising Sun, 2nd class
- 1906 – Order of the Golden Kite, 2nd class
- 1914 – Grand Cordon of the Order of the Sacred Treasure
- 1918 – Grand Cordon of the Order of the Rising Sun
