= Sandra Ramírez (referee) =

Mexican football referee (born 1989)

- Born: Sandra Ramírez Alemán; 8 January 1989 (age 37); Guadalajara, Jalisco, Mexico
- Other occupation: Dentist

Domestic
Years	League	Role
2010–2019	Various divisions of Mexican football	Assistant referee
2019–present	Liga MX; Liga MX Femenil	Assistant referee

International
Years	League	Role
2019–present	FIFA listed	Assistant referee

Sandra Ramírez Alemán (born 8 January 1989) is a Mexican football assistant referee who has been listed on the FIFA International Referees List since 2019.

== Career ==
Ramírez Alemán was born on 8 January 1989 in Guadalajara, Jalisco, and played football in her adolescence and early youth while she studied dentistry at the University of Guadalajara. She began her career in refereeing when one of her teammates at the university's football team asked her to relieve her in a match that she could not oversee because of other responsibilities. After that game, Ramírez started studies into professional refereeing at the school of the Mexican Football Federation. At university, she also practiced athletics aside from football.

Between 2010 and 2019, Ramírez alternated between her profession as a dentist and an assistant referee. She made her debut at the Ascenso MX in a match between Potros UAEM and Zacatepec F.C. She continued ascending through local leagues, including the Liga Premier de México and youth competitions, until reaching Liga MX in both women's and men's tournaments.

Outside Mexican leagues, Ramírez made her international debut at the 2022 FIFA U-20 Women's World Cup in Costa Rica. In 2023, she suffered from a fibular fracture as a consequence of stress. After making a full recovery, Ramírez was selected for the 2023 FIFA Women's World Cup in Australia and New Zealand, where she served as an assistant referee for Honduran referee Melissa Borjas in two group stage games: Italy vs Argentina and Germany vs Colombia. In 2024, Ramírez was called for games at the CONCACAF Nations League Finals, the 2024 CONCACAF W Gold Cup, and the 2025 CONCACAF Gold Cup, as well as qualification matches for the FIFA World Cup for CONCACAF. That same year, she took part in the 2024 Summer Olympics, serving under referee Katia Itzel García and along with fellow Mexican assistant referee Karen Díaz, overseeing the match between Germany and Australia.

In April 2026, Ramírez was appointed to the 2026 FIFA World Cup in North America, serving again under pitch referee García.
