= Peng Shimeng =

Chinese footballer

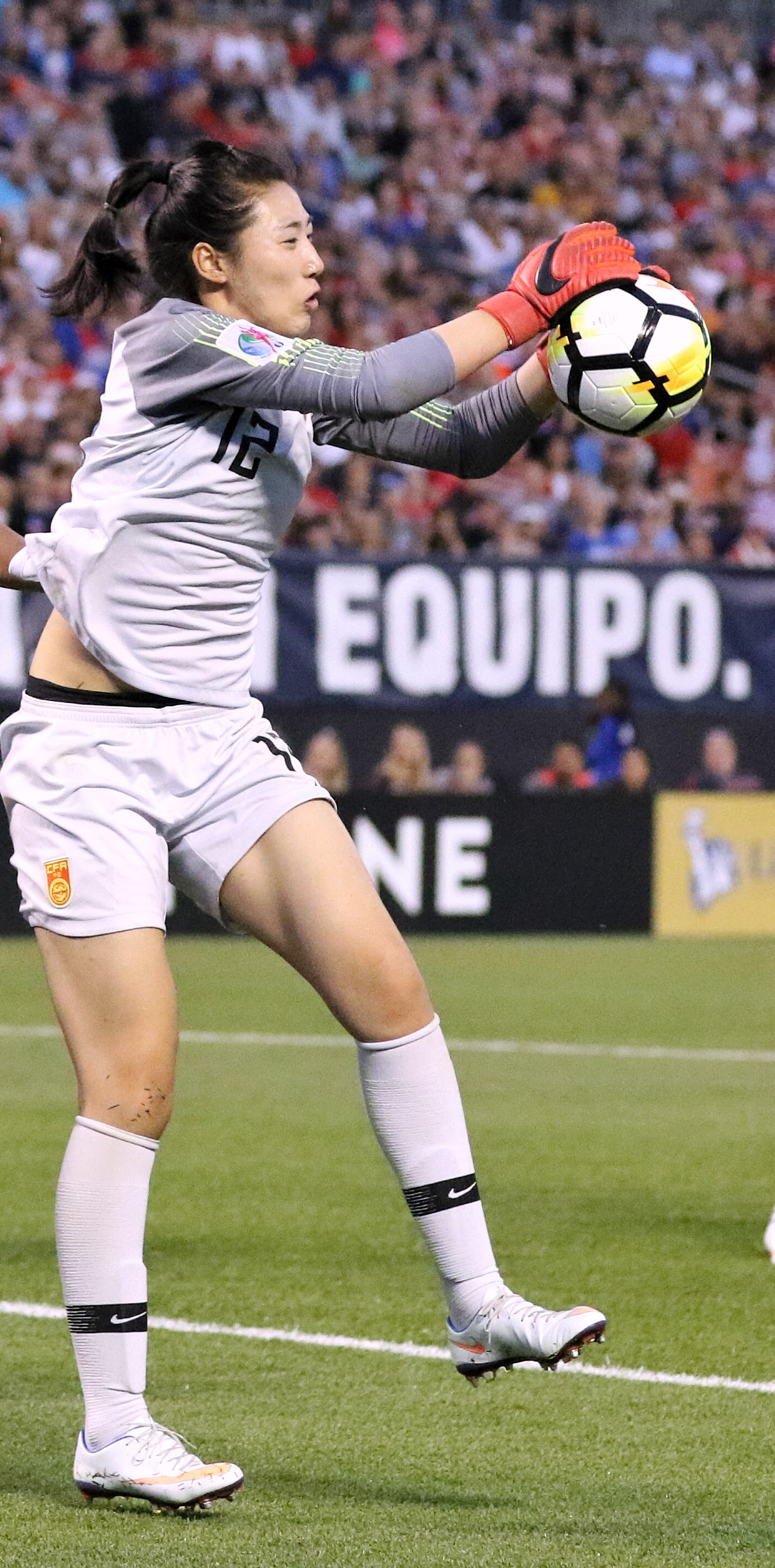

Personal information
- Full name: Peng Shimeng
- Date of birth: 12 May 1998 (age 28)
- Place of birth: Yancheng, Jiangsu, China
- Height: 1.82 m (6 ft 0 in)
- Position: Goalkeeper

Team information
- Current team: Wuhan Jianghan University
- Number: 12

Senior career*
Years	Team	Apps	(Gls)
-2020	Jiangsu	10	(0)
2020–2021	Guangdong	9	(0)
2022	Jiangsu		
2022–2025	Guangdong	23	(0)
2026–	Wuhan Jianghan University	0	(0)

International career^{‡}
2017–	China	30	(0)
- * Club domestic league appearances and goals ‡ National team caps and goals as of 22 July 2021

Peng Shimeng (Chinese: 彭诗梦; pinyin: Péng Shīmèng; born 12 May 1998) is a Chinese professional footballer who plays as a goalkeeper for Wuhan Jianghan University.

Peng participated in the 2019 FIFA Women's World Cup. She was named Player of the Match in China PR's draw with Spain.
