= Desiree Ellis =

South African soccer player and manager

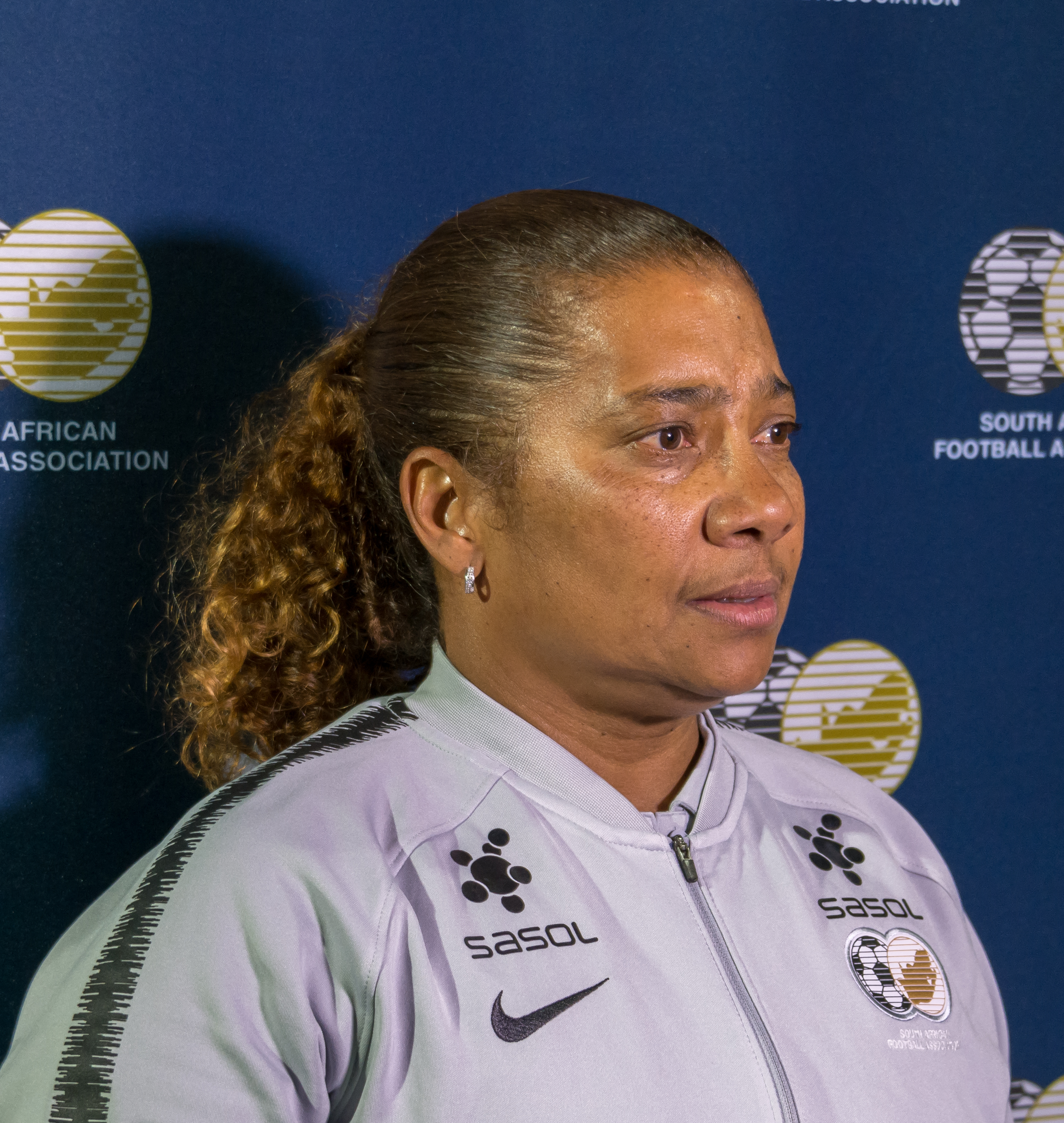
- Ellis in 2019

Personal information
- Full name: Desiree Ellis
- Date of birth: 14 March 1963 (age 63)
- Place of birth: Salt River, Cape Town, South Africa
- Position: Midfielder

Team information
- Current team: South Africa (manager)

Youth career
- Saban United

Senior career*
Years	Team	Apps	(Gls)
1978–1984	Athlone Celtic	126	(51)
1985–1986	Wynberg St Johns	44	(22)
1987–1988	Joyces United	46	(28)
1989–1990	St. Albans City	54	(36)
1991–2002	Spurs Ladies	330	(231)
Total		600	(368)

International career
1993–2002	South Africa	32	(6)

Managerial career
- 2006–2016: Spurs Ladies
- 2016–: South Africa Women
- * Club domestic league appearances and goals as of 15 August 2014

Desiree Ellis OIG (born 14 March 1963) is a South African soccer manager and former player. She currently coaches the South Africa women's national team.

As a player, Ellis played club soccer for 24 years with South African, Irish, and English club teams, primarily playing as a midfielder. Her longest club spell was for Spurs Ladies, with whom she played for 11 total years. Internationally, she represented and was a founding member of the South Africa women's national team, which officially formed in 1993 following SAFA's admission to FIFA in 1992. At 30 years old, she debuted for South Africa as vice captain of the team's first-ever official match, a 13–0 win against Eswatini (formerly Swaziland). Ellis continued to play soccer for the next 9 years, retiring in 2002 at the age of 39.

As coach of the South Africa women's national team since 2016, she coached Banyana Banyana to a runners-up finish at the 2018 Women's Africa Cup of Nations (WAFCON), qualifying them for their first ever Women's World Cup tournament, the 2019 FIFA Women's World Cup. In 2022, she coached the team to their first ever WAFCON title, which also qualified them to their second Women's World Cup tournament. At the 2023 Women's World Cup, the team qualified to the knockout rounds of the tournament for the first time in their history, bowing out in the Round of 16 after facing the Netherlands.

For her accomplishments with Banyana Banyana, she has been given CAF Women's Coach of the Year honors every year from 2018 to 2023, totaling four awards. In April 2023, Ellis was bestowed the National Order of Ikhamanga by the South African Government for her contributions to soccer.

== Early life ==
Ellis was born on 14 March 1963 to father Ernest Ellis (d. 1989) and mother Natalie, both Coloureds, in Salt River, a suburb of Cape Town. As a child, she stayed at her grandmother's home after school as both her parents worked during the day. There were no women's clubs then, and she played soccer with boys and her cousins. After school she would drop off her school bag, change her clothes and run outside to her waiting teammates. Her father often threatened to send her to school barefoot because she would ruin her shoes while playing soccer.

She attended Dryden Street Primary School and Salt River High School.

== Club career ==
Ellis eventually found another women's club (Athlone Celtic was the first club she played for), Spurs Ladies while she still worked at a butchery in Lansdowne mixing spices.

She once left town with the club over a weekend, promising her employers that she'd return in time for work but the vehicle the team was travelling in broke down on the way home, making her fail to arrive on time. Consequently, Ellis was fired.

== International career ==
Ellis went for trials for the national team and passed. She would feature in the team's first international match. She debuted against Swaziland at the age of 30 on 30 May 1993 in a 14–0 win. Ellis scored a hat-trick, as did two other players. During the 1995 World Cup qualifiers, South Africa beat Zimbabwe, Zambia and Angola on aggregate, 10–1, 11–5 and 6–4 but lost to Nigeria 11–2. When South Africa hosted the 2000 African Women's Championship, she captained the side to a runner-up finish. In 2000, Ellis was nominated alongside Mercy Akide and Florence Omagbemi for African Woman Footballer of the Year.

She was recognized for her services to soccer the same year when she received a Silver Presidential Sports Award. She also led Banyana Banyana to the 2002 COSAFA Cup victory. In her 32 caps for South Africa she won 23 matches, lost seven and drew two.

She retired from soccer in April 2002 at the age of 38.

== Coaching career ==
Ellis was appointed interim manager of the South Africa women's national soccer team in 2016 after Vera Pauw resigned following the team's group stage exit at the 2016 Olympics. Ellis was appointed head coach in February 2018 and coached the team, then ranked 50th in the world, to a second-place finish in the Africa Women Cup of Nations, losing to 11-time champions Nigeria on penalty kicks in the final; nonetheless, by finishing second, South Africa qualified to its first-ever FIFA Women's World Cup in 2019. She was awarded Confederation of African Football Women's Coach of the Year in 2018, 2019 and 2022.

Ellis coached Banyana Banyana to their maiden Africa Cup of Nations victory in Morocco in 2022. She made history with Banyana Banyana by beating Italy and making it to the final sixteen in the 2023 FIFA Women's World Cup.

In September 2023, she won the Momentum Coach of the Year award at the 18th edition of Africa's foremost women's sport awards at the Wanderers Club in Johannesburg. In December 2023, she won the CAF Women's Coach of the Year award for the 4th time, for her team's efforts at the 2023 World Cup. Ellis had previously won at the CAF Awards in 2022, 2019 and 2018.

She was ranked 7th in the IFFHS Women's World Best National Coach ranking for 2023.

== Outside soccer ==
=== Administration ===
Ellis had many administration occupations during her playing career. She was the vice-president of Western Province Women's Football Association from 1994 to 1995, and was the PRO of the association from 1996 to 1997. She worked as a chief librarian at the photo agency Touchline in 2001.

=== Media ===
Ellis can be seen on TV as a soccer commentator and a pundit on local television station e-TV. She was an ambassador for the 2010 FIFA World Cup. She also worked at Gallo Images as a picture editor.

== Honours ==
=== Player ===
South Africa

- COSAFA Women's Championship: 2002
- Women's Africa Cup of Nations runners-up: 2000

Individual

- Mobil Achievement Award by WP Sportswriters: 1980
- SAFA Women's Inter-provincials: 1986, 1989, 1992
- Foschini Cape Woman Football Player of the Year: 1989, 1993
- WP Player of the Year: 1983, 1993
- Sanlam Sports Star of the Month (November): 2000
- SAFA Special Recognition Gold Award: 2001
- Presidential Sports Silver Award: 2001
- Mandisa Shiceka Role Model Award by ANC Youth League: 2001

=== Manager ===
South Africa

- Women's Africa Cup of Nations: 2022, runners-up: 2018
- COSAFA Women's Championship: 2018, 2019, 2020
- Aisha Buhari Cup: 2021

Individual

- Sports Minister's Excellence Award: 2017
- Confederation of African Football Women's Coach of the Year: 2018, 2019, 2022, 2023
- Momentum Coach of the Year: 2023
- IFFHS Women's World Best National Coach: 7th
