= Ōsako Naoharu =

Japanese general (1844–1927)

Viscount Ōsako Naoharu
- 大迫 尚敏
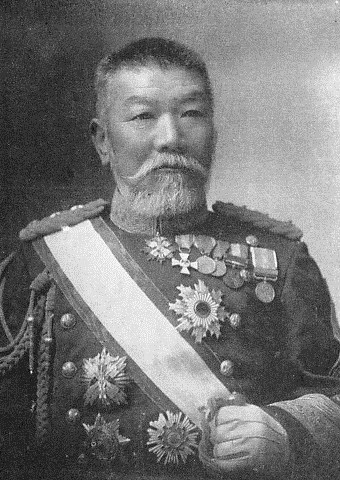
- Born: 24 December 1844; Satsuma Domain, Japan
- Died: 20 September 1927 (aged 82)
- Military career
- Allegiance: Empire of Japan
- Branch: Imperial Japanese Army
- Service years: 1871–1907
- Rank: General
- Conflicts: Anglo-Satsuma War; Boshin War; Satsuma Rebellion; First Sino-Japanese War; Russo-Japanese War
- Other work: Principal of the Gakushūin

Viscount Ōsako Naoharu (大迫 尚敏, Naoharu Ōsako; 24 December 1844 – 20 September 1927), sometimes known as Ōsako Naotoshi, was a general in the early Imperial Japanese Army. He was the older brother of General Ōsako Naomichi.

== Biography ==
Ōsako was born as the eldest son to Ōsako Shinzō, a samurai of Satsuma Domain (present day Kagoshima Prefecture). He graduated from the domain's Soshikan academy, and fought as a Satsuma samurai during the Anglo-Satsuma War and the Boshin War. He joined the fledgling Imperial Japanese Army in March 1871, and was assigned to the Army Ministry from 1873 and promoted to captain in 1874. He was called to combat duty to fight against his fellow Satsuma clansmen in the Satsuma Rebellion, and was wounded during the siege of Kumamoto Castle. During the war, he was promoted to major and served on the staff of the Kumamoto Garrison. Promoted to major in June 1883, Ōsako became commander of the IJA 6th Infantry Regiment and from May 1885 was assigned command of the 1st Guards Regiment. Promoted to colonel in 1887, he was chief-of-staff of the IJA 4th Infantry Division from October 1890 and appointed head of the 1st Bureau of the Imperial Japanese Army General Staff Office the following year. In September 1892, Ōsako was promoted to major general, and given command of the IJA 5th Infantry Brigade.

Ōsako remained commander of the brigade throughout the First Sino-Japanese War, and was awarded after the war with elevation to the kazoku peerage with the title of baron (danshaku), and the Order of the Golden Kite, 3rd class. After the war, he returned to the General Staff Office, and was promoted to lieutenant general in April 1900, and commander of the IJA 7th Infantry Division. This division was unusual in that it was tasked both with the defense, and with the settlement of Hokkaido.

With the start of the Russo-Japanese War, Ōsako participated in the Siege of Port Arthur, under the overall command of General Nogi Maresuke’s Third Army. His forces played a major role in the bloody Battle of 203 Meter Hill, where he also lost his third son. and afterwards fought at the Battle of Mukden. He returned to Japan in March 1906, was awarded the Order of the Golden Kite, 2nd class in April and was promoted to general in May. In September 1907, he was also elevated from baron to viscount (shishaku). He entered the reserves in April 1909 and retired from service in April 1914.

From November 1911, Ōsako replaced Nogi Maresuke as the principal of the Gakushūin Peer’s School, serving until August 1917. On his death in September 1927, he was awarded the Grand Cordon of the Order of the Rising Sun.

== Decorations ==
- 1885 – Order of the Rising Sun, 3rd class
- 1895 - Order of the Sacred Treasure, 2nd class
- 1895 – Order of the Rising Sun, 2nd class
- 1895 – Order of the Golden Kite, 3rd class
- 1903 – Grand Cordon of the Order of the Sacred Treasure
- 1906 – Grand Cordon of the Order of the Rising Sun
- 1906 – Order of the Golden Kite, 2nd class
- 1927 – Order of the Rising Sun with Paulownia Flowers
