= Linda Motlhalo =

South African soccer player (born 1998)

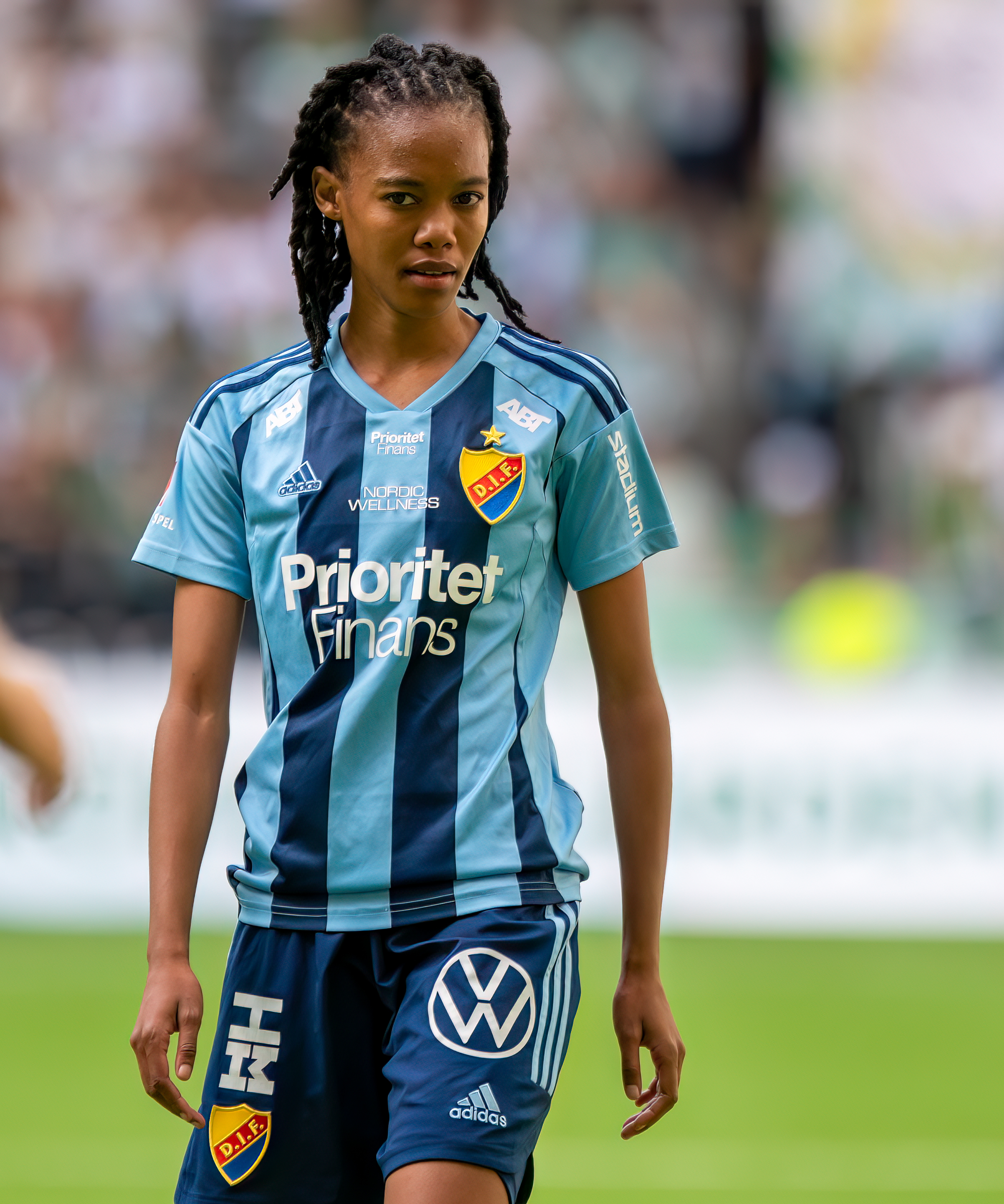
- Motlhalo with Djurgården in 2022

Personal information
- Full name: Linda Maserame Motlhalo
- Date of birth: 1 July 1998 (age 28)
- Place of birth: Brandvlei, Gauteng, South Africa
- Height: 1.63 m (5 ft 4 in)
- Position: Winger

Team information
- Current team: Glasgow City
- Number: 10

Senior career*
Years	Team	Apps	(Gls)
- JVW
2018	Houston Dash	21	(1)
2019	Beijing BG Phoenix	14	(2)
2020–2023	Djurgården	67	(3)
2023–2024	Glasgow City	16	(3)
2024	Racing Louisville	1	(0)
2025–	Glasgow City		

International career^{‡}
2015	South Africa U17		
2017	South Africa U20		(9)
2017–	South Africa	104	(25)
Medal record
Representing South Africa
Women's Africa Cup of Nations
Second place	2018 Ghana
First place	2022 Morocco
- * Club domestic league appearances and goals as of 01 May 2023 ‡ National team caps and goals as of 17 August 2026

Linda Maserame Motlhalo (born 1 July 1998) is a South African professional soccer player who plays as a winger for Glasgow City and the South Africa women's national team. She is also known as the 'Randfontein Ronaldinho'.

== Early life ==
Linda Motlhalo was born in Badirile, Brandvlei, in Randfontein, Gauteng, on 1 July 1998. Her family has a footballing history, with her father Johannes Motlhalo attempting to become a professional player. Although he failed to do so, his brother Joseph Motlhalo became a goalkeeper for Kaizer Chiefs F.C. between 1970 and 1985.

Motlhalo attended TuksSport High School, during which time she was part of the South African High Performance Centre in Pretoria.

== Club career ==
=== Houston Dash ===
On 1 February 2018 Motlhalo signed with the Houston Dash in the National Women's Soccer League. She was brought in by Dash head coach Vera Pauw who coached the South African national team from 2014 to 2016. Motlhalo made 21 NWSL appearances for the Dash and scored 1 goal.

Motlhalo was waived by the Houston Dash on 6 February 2019.

=== Beijing BG Phoenix F.C. ===
On 22 February 2019 Motlhalo was unveiled as a player of Beijing BG Phoenix F.C. in the Chinese Women's Super League, joining her South African and former Houston Dash teammate Thembi Kgatlana who also made the move to China.

Motlhalo started all 14 league games for Beijing across the 2019 season as the team finished fifth in the CWSL, playing the majority of the campaign in a deeper central midfield role. She also helped guide Beijing to a semifinal finish in the Chinese Women's Championship.

=== Djurgårdens IF ===
On 18 January 2020 it was announced that Motlhalo had joined Swedish side Djurgårdens IF on a two-year deal, subject to receipt of her working visa.

Motlhalo made her debut on 22 February 2020, scoring twice after coming on as a substitute in a Stockholm derby victory over AIK. In January 2021 she was named Newcomer of the Year by her Djurgården teammates for her performances across the 2020 season.

In January 2022, it was announced that Motlhalo had signed a new two-year contract to remain at the club.

=== Glasgow City ===
On 23 January 2023, Motlhalo officially joined SWPL 1 club Glasgow City on a permanent deal, signing a contract until June 2025 with the Scottish club.

On 21 May 2023, Motlhalo provided a 92nd minute assist as Glasgow City beat Rangers 1–0 at Ibrox Stadium to win the SWPL title on the final day of the season. She was also named player of the match.

=== Racing Louisville ===
On 18 January 2024, Mothlalo signed a two-year contract with Racing Louisville FC of the National Women's Soccer League. Racing Louisville paid an undisclosed transfer fee to Glasgow City and signed Mothlalo through the 2025 season, with a mutual option for 2026. Motlhalo made three total appearances for the club across all competitions in 2024. The two parties agreed to mutually terminate her contract in February 2025.

=== Glasgow City ===
She returned to Glasgow City in February 2025. She helped the team to the 2025–2026 Scottish Women's Premier League Cup in March 2026.

== International career ==
While attending the High Performance Centre, Motlhalo played for the South Africa women's national under-20 football team as a forward. This included in matches as part of the 2015 African U-20 Women's World Cup Qualifying Tournament.

Motlhalo was called up to the senior squad for the first time in October 2015, following an injury to Thembi Kgatlana which caused her to be withdrawn from the team. Motlhalo did not play at the time, but instead made her debut against Cameroon in 2016, in which she scored in the 2–2 draw. She said, "I am just happy to have been part of this team. The senior players have made me feel at home and it was good to rub shoulders with the likes of Janine and Amanda. I really enjoyed my time here."

In 2016, Motlhalo attended the 2016 Summer Olympics in Rio de Janeiro, before playing the 2016 Africa Women Cup of Nations in Cameroon as part of the Banyana Banyana side.

At the 2018 Africa Women Cup of Nations in Ghana, Motlhalo started all five games for South Africa as the team reached the final of the competition before losing to Nigeria on penalties. She scored one goal at the competition and was named Player of the Match during her side's semifinal encounter with Mali.

Motlhalo attended the 2019 FIFA Women's World Cup with South Africa but came into the tournament struggling with injury. While she started the side's opening game with Spain, the remainder of her tournament was limited to a late substitute appearance against China.

In September 2021, Motlhalo scored for South Africa in a decisive 4–2 win over Nigeria as Banyana Banyana won the inaugural Aisha Buhari Cup in Lagos. Motlhalo was subsequently South Africa's top-scorer in qualification for the 2022 Africa Women Cup of Nations, scoring five goals across four fixtures with Mozambique and Algeria to help Banyana Banyana book a place at the finals.

In South Africa’s opening match of the 2026 Women’s Africa Cup of Nations, she became the thirteenth player in the national team’s history to reach 100 international appearances when the team lost 2–1 against Tanzania.

=== International goals ===
Scores and results list South Africa's goal tally first

No.	Date	Venue	Opponent	Score	Result	Competition
1	29 March 2016	Limbe Stadium, Limbe, Cameroon	Cameroon	1–1	2–2	Friendly
2	25 November 2016	Limbe Stadium, Limbe, Cameroon	Egypt	5–0	5–0	2016 Africa Women Cup of Nations
5	17 September 2018	Wolfson Stadium, KwaZakele, South Africa	Malawi	1–0	6–0	2018 COSAFA Women's Championship
6	17 September 2018	Wolfson Stadium, KwaZakele, South Africa	Malawi	5–0	6–0	2018 COSAFA Women's Championship
7	17 September 2018	Wolfson Stadium, KwaZakele, South Africa	Malawi	6–0	6–0	2018 COSAFA Women's Championship
8	20 September 2018	Wolfson Stadium, KwaZakele, South Africa	Uganda	1–0	2–0	2018 COSAFA Women's Championship
9	21 November 2018	Cape Coast Sports Stadium, Cape Coast, Ghana	Equatorial Guinea	1–0	7–1	2018 Africa Women Cup of Nations
10	7 April 2019	Moses Mabhida Stadium, Durban, South Africa	Jamaica	1–1	1–1	International Friendly
11	21 September 2021	Onikan Stadium, Lagos, Nigeria	Nigeria	2–0	4–2	Aisha Buhari Cup
12	20 October 2021	Estádio do Zimpeto, Maputo, Angola	Mozambique	2–0	7–0	2022 Africa Women Cup of Nations qualification
13	20 October 2021	Estádio do Zimpeto, Maputo, Angola	Mozambique	7–0	7–0	2022 Africa Women Cup of Nations qualification
14	26 October 2021	Orlando Stadium, Johannesburg, South Africa	Mozambique	2–0	6–0	2022 Africa Women Cup of Nations qualification
15	26 October 2021	Orlando Stadium, Johannesburg, South Africa	Mozambique	5–0	6–0	2022 Africa Women Cup of Nations qualification
16	23 February 2022	Stade Omar Hamadi, Algiers, Algeria	Algeria	1–1	1–1	2022 Africa Women Cup of Nations qualification
17	7 July 2022	Stade Moulay Hassan, Rabat, Morocco	Burundi	3–1	3–1	2022 Women's Africa Cup of Nations
18	18 July 2022	Stade Mohammed V, Casablanca, Morocco	Zambia	1–0	1–0	2022 Women's Africa Cup of Nations
19	28 July 2023	Forsyth Barr Stadium, Dunedin, New Zealand	Argentina	1–0	2–2	2023 FIFA Women's World Cup
20	4 December 2023	Lucas Moripe Stadium, Pretoria, South Africa	Burkina Faso	1–0	2–0	2024 Women's Africa Cup of Nations qualification
21	2 December 2024	Montego Bay Sports Complex, Montego Bay, Jamaica	Jamaica	1–0	2–3	Friendly
22	5 April 2025	UJ Soweto Stadium, Soweto, South Africa	Malawi	2–0	3–0	Friendly
23	7 July 2025	Honneur Stadium, Oujda, Morocco	Ghana	1–0	2–0	2024 Women's Africa Cup of Nations
24	22 July 2025	Larbi Zaouli Stadium, Casablanca, Morocco	Nigeria	1–1	1–2	2024 Women's Africa Cup of Nations
25	9 June 2026	Natural Grass Main Field S1, Osako, Japan	Japan	1–0	1–0	Friendly

== Honours ==
Glasgow City

- Scottish Women's Premier League: 2022–23
- Scottish Women's Premier League Cup: 2025–2026

International

- Africa Women Cup of Nations: 2022; runner-up: 2018
- Aisha Buhari Cup: 2021

Individual

- COSAFA Women's Championship top-scorer: 2018
- Djurgårdens IF Newcomer of the Year: 2020
- CAF Team of the Year Women's XI: 2023, 2024
