= Kaylin Swart =

South African soccer player (born 1994)

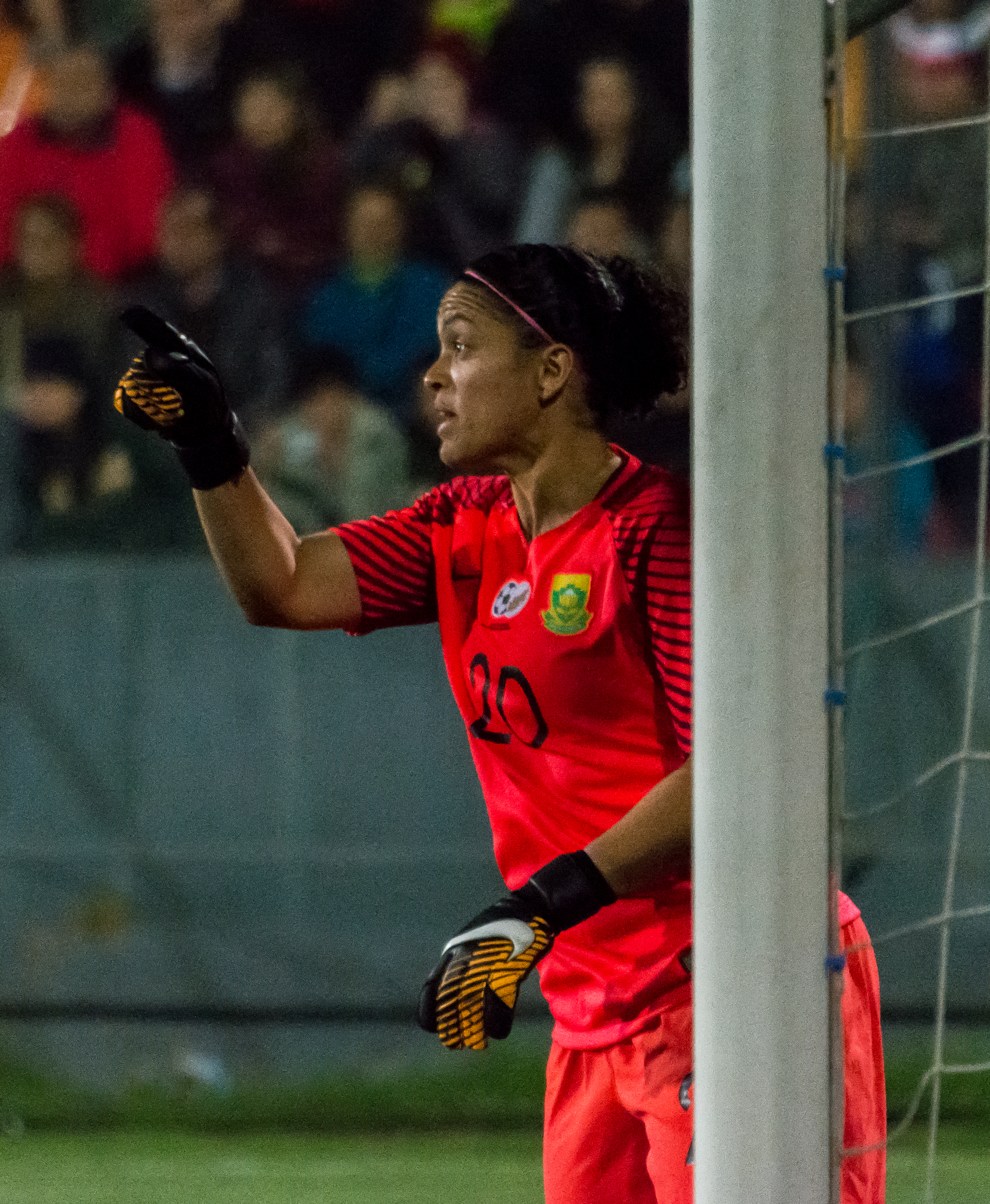
- Swart with South Africa in 2018

Personal information
- Full name: Kaylin Christen Swart
- Date of birth: 30 September 1994 (age 32)
- Place of birth: Port Elizabeth, South Africa
- Height: 1.64 m (5 ft 5 in)
- Position: Goalkeeper

Team information
- Current team: JvW
- Number: 1

College career
Years	Team	Apps	(Gls)
2014	AIB College of Business		
2015–2017	Menlo Oaks	53	(0)

Senior career*
Years	Team	Apps	(Gls)
2018	Des Moines Menace	2	(0)
2021–	JvW		

International career^{‡}
2010	South Africa U17	3	(0)
2016–	South Africa	36	(0)
Medal record
Representing South Africa
Women's Africa Cup of Nations
Second place	2018 Ghana
First place	2022 Morocco
- * Club domestic league appearances and goals ‡ National team caps and goals as of 20 July 2023 (prior the 2023 FIFA Women's World Cup)

Kaylin Christen Swart (Afrikaans: [svart]; born 30 September 1994) is a South African soccer player who plays as a goalkeeper for SAFA Women's League club JvW and the South Africa women's national team. Swart is the only Coloured female player that currently represents South Africa.

== Early life ==
Swart was born on 30 September 1994 in Port Elizabeth, South Africa.

Swart is Coloured.

== College career ==
Swart started her youth career at Springs Home Sweepers FC in South Africa from which she participated in the 2010 FIFA U-17 Women's World Cup squads in Trinidad and Tobago.

Kaylin started her career at AIB College of Business but later transferred to Menlo College to play for the Menlo Oaks in 2015.She appeared in 19 games and made 18 starts during her first season at Menlo and earned a record of 6–6–4 while allowing 17 goals. She had a goals against average of 0.87 (best in Menlo College history) and recorded six shoutouts (second most in team history). She earned All-GSAC honors and an Honorable Mention honors for the NAIA All-American team (the second player in Menlo history to receive this honor). Kaylin also helped Menlo to second place in the conference in goals allowed per game (0.78). In 2016 (her junior year at Menlo), she appeared in 18 games and made 16 starts and had seven shutouts along with a 5–7–3 record. She had a goals against average of .828 beating her record the previous year to be the best in Menlo College history. She was named in National Soccer Coaches Association of America's All Southwest Region team and was a Third Team All-American, as well as being named in the 2016 All-GSAC. In 2017 (her senior year at Menlo), she appeared in 16 games (all starts). She recorded six shutouts with a 6–4–3 record. She had a goals against average of 0.82 setting a new record in the program history. She was an All-GSAC, All-Region, and Third-Team All-American honors. She concluded her career with the most saves, shutouts, and the best goals against average in program history. In her senior year, she picked up her first collegiate assist in a draw against The Master's University on 19 October 2017.

=== Records ===
She owns the best goals against average in Menlo program history at 0.824, a mark she set in 2017. She beat this record in each of her three seasons. She recorded at least six shutouts every year making it the most shutouts among keepers in Menlo history (with 19 shutouts in total). She is a three time All-GSAC member, three-time NSCAA All-Region player, and a two-time third team All-American in the NAIA.

== International career ==
Her first international appearance came on 9 July in 2016 in a match against the US football team in which they lost by a goal to nothing. She was the starting goalkeeper for the South Africa women football team at the 2018 Women Afcon where they lost in the finals to the Super Falcons of Nigeria in a penalty shootout.

== Honours ==
South Africa

- Women's Africa Cup of Nations: 2022, runner-up: 2018
