= Romina Núñez =

Argentine footballer (born 1994)

Personal information
- Full name: Romina Stefania Núñez
- Date of birth: 1 January 1994 (age 32)
- Place of birth: Tandil, Buenos Aires, Argentina
- Height: 1.56 m (5 ft 1 in)
- Position: Midfielder

Team information
- Current team: Talleres
- Number: 18

Senior career*
Years	Team	Apps	(Gls)
2020–2022	UAI Urquiza		
2022	León	11	(1)
2022–2023	UAI Urquiza		
2024	Betis		
2024–2025	Belgrano		
2026–	Talleres		

International career^{‡}
2021–	Argentina	39	(1)
Medal record
Women's football
Representing Argentina
Copa América Femenina
Third place	2022 Colombia
- * Club domestic league appearances and goals as of 10 March 2024 ‡ National team caps and goals as of 28 February 2024

Romina Stefania Núñez (born 1 January 1994) is an Argentine professional footballer who plays as a midfielder for Primera A club Talleres and the Argentina women's national team.

== Early life ==
Núñez was born in Tandil, Buenos Aires, Argentina.

== International goals ==
No.	Date	Venue	Opponent	Score	Result	Competition
1.	28 July 2023	Forsyth Barr Stadium, Dunedin, New Zealand	South Africa	2–2	2–2	2023 FIFA Women's World Cup
