= Spurs W.F.C. =

- Full name: Spurs Women's Football Club
- Founded: 1986
- Ground: William Herbert Sports Ground, Wynberg, Cape Town, Western Cape
- League: Cape District Local Football Association

Spurs Women's Football Club is a South African women's association football club based in the Wynberg area of Cape Town.

== History ==
This club was founded in 1986; according to their Facebook page, this makes them "one of the oldest if not the oldest" women's football club in South Africa. The club has won numerous titles such as the Coke Cup and the National Vodacom Play off in 2003/2004 by beating Moroka Swallows Ladies, the defending champions. The team has been represented by players in the South African senior women's national team, at U-20.
