= Benedetta Orsi =

Italian footballer (born 2000)

Personal information
- Date of birth: 25 February 2000 (age 26)
- Place of birth: Sassuolo, Italy
- Height: 1.67 m (5 ft 6 in)
- Position: Defender

Team information
- Current team: Fiorentina
- Number: 20

Senior career*
Years	Team	Apps	(Gls)
2014–2017	Reggiana	52	(14)
2017–2018	Empoli	16	(0)
2018–2025	Sassuolo	115	(1)
2025–	Fiorentina	7	(0)

International career
2018–2019	Italy U19	3	(0)
2022–	Italy	6	(0)
- * Club domestic league appearances and goals as of 06:11, 7 December 2025 (UTC)

Benedetta Orsi (born 25 February 2000) is an Italian professional footballer who plays as a defender for Serie A club Fiorentina and the Italy national team. She represented Italy at the 2023 FIFA Women's World Cup.

== Career ==
Orsi started her top-class career with Reggiana, winning the Serie B title in 2016–17. With the club being promoted as Sassuolo, Orsi moved to Empoli in 2017 before returning to the now-renamed Sassuolo the following year.

Orsi enjoyed three top-four finishes with Sassuolo in Serie A – third in 2020–21, with fourth-place taken by the club in 2021–22 and 2023–24. She celebrated her 100th game for the club in 2024.

In July 2025, Orsi moved to ACF Fiorentina after nine years at Sassuolo.

== International career ==
=== Youth ===
Benedetta Orsi was part of the national youth selections starting at Under-16 and Under-17 level, playing in the 2016 UEFA Women's Under-17 Championship under Rita Guarino.

Subsequently, Orsi was called up to the national Under-19 team, taking part in the qualifications for the 2019 European Championship, but Italy were eliminated in the elite qualifying phase. Orsi went on to play in the 2019 La Manga Tournament with Italy.

=== Senior ===
Orsi was called up by Milena Bertolini for the first time to the senior national team in March 2021 for a friendly against Iceland, but did not take to the field. She made her national team debut on 16 February 2022, being fielded as a starter in Italy's first match at the 2022 Algarve Cup, which they won 1–0 against Denmark.

She was included in the Italy national squad for the 2023 FIFA Women's World Cup, playing one match. The Azzurrine were eliminated in the group stage, beating Argentina 1–0 but losing 5–0 to Sweden and 3–2 to South Africa, with Orsi only featuring in the latter, opening the scoring for South Africa with an own goal.

== Honours ==
Reggiana

- Serie B: 2016–2017
