= Thembi Kgatlana =

South African soccer player (born 1996)

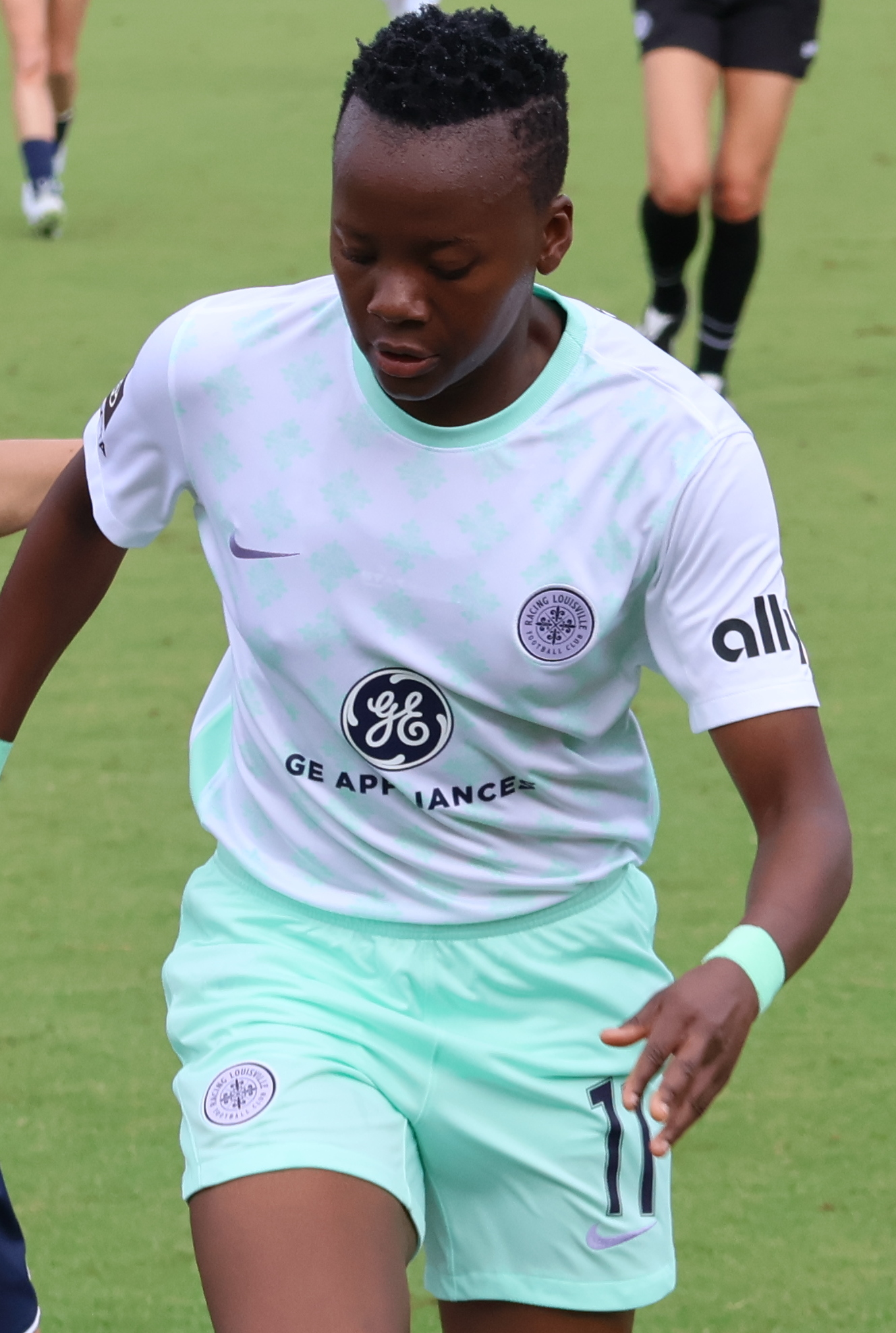
- Kgatlana with Racing Louisville FC in 2023

Personal information
- Full name: Chrestinah Thembi Kgatlana
- Date of birth: 2 May 1996 (age 30)
- Place of birth: Mohlakeng, South Africa
- Height: 1.56 m (5 ft 1 in)
- Position: Forward

Team information
- Current team: Tigres UANL
- Number: 16

Senior career*
Years	Team	Apps	(Gls)
- Univ. of the Western Cape
2018	Houston Dash	16	(2)
2019	Beijing BG Phoenix	10	(6)
2020	Benfica	2	(3)
2020–2021	Eibar	27	(10)
2021–2022	Atlético Madrid	25	(6)
2022–2023	Racing Louisville	18	(2)
2024–	Tigres UANL	51	(18)

International career^{‡}
2014–	South Africa	85	(37)
Medal record
Representing South Africa
Women's Africa Cup of Nations
Second place	2018 Ghana
First place	2022 Morocco
- * Club domestic league appearances and goals as of 2 September 2025 ‡ National team caps and goals as of 5 November 2024

Chrestinah Thembi Kgatlana (born 2 May 1996) is a South African professional soccer player who plays as a forward for Liga MX Femenil club Tigres UANL Femenil and the South Africa women's national team.

== Club career ==
=== Houston Dash ===
In February 2018, Kgatlana moved to the United States to join the Houston Dash in the National Women's Soccer League. She was brought in by her former national team coach Vera Pauw. Kgatlana joined her South African teammates Janine van Wyk and Linda Motlhalo in Houston. Kgatlana made 16 appearances with Houston and she scored 2 goals.

Kgatlana was waived by the Houston Dash on 6 February 2019 so she could sign with Beijing BG Phoenix F.C.

=== Beijing BG Phoenix ===
On 22 February 2019, Kgatlana was announced as having signed with Beijing BG Phoenix F.C. in the Chinese Women's Super League on a one-year deal. She was joined by South African teammate Linda Motlhalo who also made the move from Houston to China.

Kgatlana scored six league goals in 10 appearances during the 2019 Chinese Women's Super League campaign, helping her Beijing BG Phoenix side to a fifth-place finish.

=== SL Benfica ===
On 27 January 2020 she signed with SL Benfica. On 1 February 2020 she made her debut with the club being subbed on in a 3–1 win over Braga in Taça da Liga Feminina.

Prior to their cancellation owing to the COVID-19 pandemic, Kgatlana helped Benfica to the final of both Portuguese Cup and Taca da Liga Femenina competitions as well as the top of the league table. The result was enough to qualify the club for the UEFA Women's Champions League for the first time in their history.

=== SD Eibar ===
Kgatlana's spell at Benfica came to an early end owing to complications arising from the COVID-19 crisis, with a salary cap introduced across Portuguese women's football. On 21 July 2020, it was announced that she had joined newly promoted Spanish Primera División side SD Eibar on a one-year contract. Kgatlana made her debut on 4 October 2020 in a 1–0 victory over Real Betis, before opening her goalscoring account the following week in a 2–2 draw against Levante.

On 31 October 2020, Kgatlana scored her second goal for the club on her first start in a 1–0 victory over Espanyol, however she was forced off with the game still in the first half due to a minor injury. Upon her return from injury, she immediately returned to goalscoring form with a stunning strike in a 3–1 defeat to Real Madrid having once again entered from the substitutes bench.

=== Racing Louisville ===
NWSL club Racing Louisville paid a transfer fee to obtain Kgatlana on 6 July 2022. She signed a two-year contract with a club option for the 2024 season. However, she missed the 2022 season after tearing her Achilles tendon against Botswana in the 2022 Women's Africa Cup of Nations. She debuted for Racing on 6 May against Orlando Pride, her first match since tearing her Achilles tendon in 2022. On 12 May, joining the match as an 81st-minute substitute, she assisted on Racing's third goal of the match.

=== Tigres UANL ===
On 20 December 2023, Racing Louisville FC agreed to transfer Kgatlana to Tigres UANL for the second largest transfer fee in league history of $275,000. She scored in the 2025 Apertura final as part of Tigres' comeback in the second half of the first leg against Club America. Tigres went on to win the title after winning the second leg, giving Kgatlana her first league championship with the club.

== International career ==
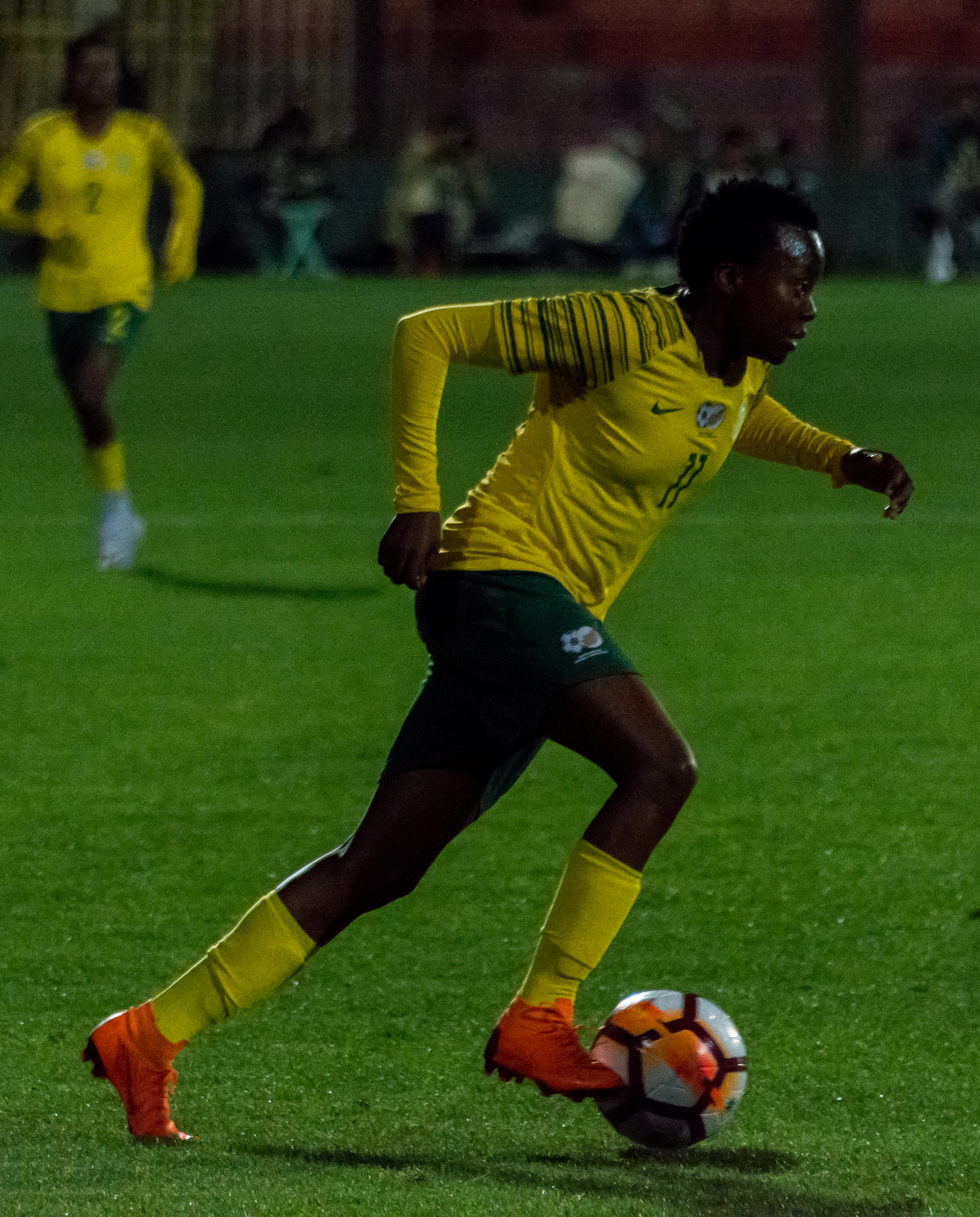
Kgatlana with South Africa in 2018

Kgatlana represented her country at the 2016 Summer Olympics and the 2018 Africa Women Cup of Nations, where she won the Player of the Tournament and was the highest goal scorer. She also represented South Africa at the 2019 FIFA Women's World Cup in France, where she scored her country's first goal ever in the tournament. On 2 August 2023, she scored the winning goal in a 3–2 victory over Italy in the 2023 FIFA Women's World Cup last group stage match, to be her country's first ever win in the competition which led to their qualification to the knockout phase.

=== International goals ===
Scores and results list South Africa's goal tally first

No.	Date	Venue	Opponent	Score	Result	Competition
1	10 November 2016	Barbourfields Stadium, Bulawayo, Zimbabwe	Zimbabwe	1–0	3–0	Friendly
2	10 November 2016	Barbourfields Stadium, Bulawayo, Zimbabwe	Zimbabwe	2–0	3–0	Friendly
3	14 September 2017	Luveve Stadium, Bulawayo, Zimbabwe	Lesotho	3–0	3–0	2017 COSAFA Women's Championship
4	15 September 2017	Barbourfields Stadium, Bulawayo, Zimbabwe	Namibia	1–0	3–1	2017 COSAFA Women's Championship
5	15 September 2017	Barbourfields Stadium, Bulawayo, Zimbabwe	Namibia	3–1	3–1	2017 COSAFA Women's Championship
6	24 September 2017	Barbourfields Stadium, Bulawayo, Zimbabwe	Zimbabwe	1–0	2–1	2017 COSAFA Women's Championship
7	2 March 2018	Tasos Markos Stadium, Paralimni, Cyprus	Hungary	1–0	1–0	2018 Cyprus Cup
8	10 October 2018	Estadio Santa Laura, Santiago, Chile	Chile	2–1	2–2	Friendly
10	18 November 2018	Cape Coast Sports Stadium, Cape Coast, Ghana	Nigeria	1–0	1–0	2018 Africa Women Cup of Nations
11	21 November 2018	Cape Coast Sports Stadium, Cape Coast, Ghana	Equatorial Guinea	4–1	7–1	2018 Africa Women Cup of Nations
12	21 November 2018	Cape Coast Sports Stadium, Cape Coast, Ghana	Equatorial Guinea	5–1	7–1	2018 Africa Women Cup of Nations
13	24 November 2018	Accra Sports Stadium, Accra, Ghana	Zambia	1–0	1–1	2018 Africa Women Cup of Nations
14	27 November 2018	Cape Coast Sports Stadium, Cape Coast, Ghana	Mali	1–0	2–0	2018 Africa Women Cup of Nations
15	19 January 2019	Cape Town Stadium, Cape Town, South Africa	Netherlands	1–2	1–2	Friendly
16	19 January 2019	GSZ Stadium, Larnaca, Cyprus	Finland	2–2	2–2	2019 Cyprus Women's Cup
17	8 June 2019	Stade Océane, Le Havre, France	Spain	1–0	1–3	2019 FIFA Women's World Cup
18	10 April 2021	Bidvest Stadium, Johannesburg, South Africa	Zambia	2–0	3–0	Friendly
19	13 April 2021	Bidvest Stadium, Johannesburg, South Africa	Botswana	1–0	2–0	Friendly
20	17 September 2021	Onikan Stadium, Lagos, Nigeria	Ghana	2–0	3–0	Aisha Buhari Cup
21	18 February 2022	Orlando Stadium, Johannesburg, South Africa	Algeria	2–0	2–0	2022 Africa Women Cup of Nations qualification
22	12 April 2022	ADO Den Haag Stadium, The Hague, Netherlands	Netherlands	1–1	1–5	Friendly
23	28 July 2023	Forsyth Barr Stadium, Dunedin, New Zealand	Argentina	2–0	2–2	2023 FIFA Women's World Cup
24	2 August 2023	Wellington Regional Stadium, Wellington, New Zealand	Italy	3–2	3–2	2023 FIFA Women's World Cup
25	25 October 2023	Stade des Martyrs, Kinshasa, DR Congo	DR Congo	1–1	1–1	2024 CAF Women's Olympic Qualifying Tournament
26	30 October 2023	Orlando Stadium, Johannesburg, South Africa	DR Congo	1–0	2–0	2024 CAF Women's Olympic Qualifying Tournament
27	30 October 2023	Orlando Stadium, Johannesburg, South Africa	DR Congo	2–0	2–0	2024 CAF Women's Olympic Qualifying Tournament
28	23 February 2024	Chamazi Stadium, Dar es Salaam, Tanzania	Tanzania	2–0	3–0	2024 CAF Women's Olympic Qualifying Tournament
29	27 February 2024	Mbombela Stadium, Mbombela, South Africa	Tanzania	1–0	1–0	2024 CAF Women's Olympic Qualifying Tournament
30	29 October 2024	Coventry Building Society Arena, Coventry, England	England	1–2	1–2	Friendly
31	28 October 2025	Dobsonville Stadium, Johannesburg, South Africa	DR Congo	1–0	1–0	2026 Women's Africa Cup of Nations qualification
32	31 July 2026	Moulay Rachid Stadium, Casablanca, Morocco	Ivory Coast	1–2	2–2	2026 Women's Africa Cup of Nations
33	4 August 2026	Moulay Rachid Stadium, Casablanca, Morocco	Burkina Faso	1–0	1–0	2026 Women's Africa Cup of Nations
34	8 August 2026	Moulay El Hassan Stadium, Rabat, Morocco	Morocco	1–2	1–2	2026 Women's Africa Cup of Nations
35	13 August 2026	Moulay Rachid Stadium, Casablanca, Morocco	Nigeria	1–0	2–1	2026 Women's Africa Cup of Nations

== Career statistics ==
=== Club ===
As of 26 February 2025

Appearances and goals by club, season and competition
Club	Season	League			Cup		League Cup		Continental		Total	
Club	Season	Division	Apps	Goals	Apps	Goals	Apps	Goals	Apps	Goals	Apps	Goals
Houston Dash	2018	National Women's Soccer League	16	2	0	0	0	0	0	0	16	2
Beijing BG Phoenix	2019	Chinese Women's Super League	10	6	1	1	4	2	0	0	16	9
SL Benfica	2019–20	Campeonato Nacional Feminino	1	0	1	1	2	2	0	0	4	3
SD Eibar	2020–21	Primera División	21	10	0	0	0	0	0	0	21	10
Atletico de Madrid	2021–22	Primera División	25	6	1	0	0	0	0	0	26	6
Racing Louisville FC	2023	National Women's Soccer League	18	2	1	0	0	0	0	0	19	2
UANL Tigres	2023-24	Liga MX Femenil	20	7	0	0	0	0	0	0	20	7
UANL Tigres	2024-25	Liga MX Femenil	34	14	0	0	3	2	4	2	41	18
UANL Tigres	Total		54	21	0	0	3	2	4	2	61	25
Career total			141	45	4	2	9	6	4	2	158	55

== Personal life ==
On 5 December 2023, Kgatlana proposed to long-time girlfriend Abongile Dlani.

== Honours ==
Benfica

- Taça da Liga: 2019–20

UANL Tigres

- Liga MX Femenil: Campeon de Campeones 2023-24

International

- Women's Africa Cup of Nations: 2022, runner-up: 2018
- COSAFA Women's Championship: 2017

Individual

- CAF African Women's Footballer of the Year 2018
- CAF African Goal of the Year: 2018
- CAF Africa Women Cup of Nations Best Player: 2018
- CAF Africa Women Cup of Nations Top Scorer: 2018
- Cyprus Cup Best player 2018
- COSAFA Women's Championship Player of the Tournament: 2017
