= Aisha Buhari Cup =

- Organiser(s): Nigeria Football Federation
- Founded: 2021
- Region: Nigeria
- Teams: 6
- Current champions: South Africa (1st title)
- Most championships: South Africa (1 title)
- 2021 Aisha Buhari Cup

Aisha Buhari Invitational tournament is a football tournament organized by the Nigeria Football Federation for the female national team.

== History ==
The Inaugural edition was held in Lagos with both FIFA and CAF president honoring the event The South Africa women's national team came first in the Aisha Buhari cup's inaugural edition, while Morocco placed second after a win against Cameroon and a draw against Mali. The event was held at the Mobolaji Johnson Stadium, Lagos, Nigeria.

== Format ==
The competition comprises six nations which includes, Ghana, South Africa and the hosts Nigeria

== Results ==
Year	Host nation	Final			Third Place Match		
Year	Host nation	Champion	Score	Second Place	Third Place	Score	Fourth Place
2021; Details	Nigeria	South Africa	^{n/a}	Morocco	Nigeria		Ghana

^n/a A round-robin tournament determined the final standings.

== See also ==
- International competitions in women's association football
- FIFA Women's World Cup
- Women's Olympic Football Tournament
- Cyprus Women's Cup
- SheBelieves Cup
- Turkish Women's Cup
