= Khumalo =

Khumalo may refer to

- Khumalo clan, African clan
- Khumalo gang, former armed group in the Joe Slovo section in South Africa
- Alf Khumalo (1930–2012), South African photographer
- Bongani Khumalo (born 1987), South African footballer
- Doctor Khumalo (born 1967), retired South African soccer player
- Fred Khumalo (born 1966), South African journalist and author
- Kelly Khumalo (born 1984), South African singer and actress
- Leleti Khumalo (born 1970), Zulu South African actress
- Lobengula Khumalo (1845–1894), second and last king of the Ndebele people
- Marwick Khumalo (living), member of the House of Assembly of Swaziland
- Mbongeni Khumalo (born 1976), South African performance poet and writer
- Moses Khumalo (1979–2006), South African jazz saxophonist
- Mzi Khumalo (born 1955), South African businessman and mining entrepreneur
- Mzilikazi Khumalo (ca. 1790–1868), founding king of the Ndebele people
- Nomalanga Khumalo (living), Zimbabwean politician
- Ntombifuthi Khumalo, South African soccer coach
- Sibongile Khumalo (1957–2021), South African singer
- Sibusiso Khumalo (footballer, born 1989) (born 1989), South African footballer
- Sibusiso Khumalo (footballer, born 1991) (born 1989), South African footballer
- Thabiso Khumalo (born 1980), South African footballer
- Usimaka Walter Khumalo (born 1972), South African footballer
- Vela Khumalo (born 1977), South African football manager
- Winnie Khumalo (1973–2025), South African Kwaito and Afropop singer, actor and television personality

== See also ==
- Kumalo
