= Katleho Malebane =

South African soccer player

Personal information
- Date of birth: 22 January 2009 (age 17)
- Place of birth: Boksburg, Gauteng, South Africa
- Position: Midfielder

Team information
- Current team: Mamelodi Sundowns Ladies

Youth career
- –: Alberton F.C.
- –: JVW Girls
- –: Blackball Future
- –2024: Mamelodi Sundowns Ladies Academy

Senior career*
Years	Team	Apps	(Gls)
2024	University of Pretoria		
2025–	Mamelodi Sundowns Ladies	18	(1)

International career
2023–2024	South Africa U15		
2024–2026	South Africa U17	5	(2)
2024–	South Africa U20		
2025–	South Africa		
- * Club domestic league appearances and goals as of 12 June 2026

Katleho Malebane (born 22 January 2009) is a South African soccer player who plays as a midfielder for SAFA Women's League side Mamelodi Sundowns Ladies and the South Africa women's national team.

Malebane was named player of the tournament at the 2023 COSAFA Schools Cup. In 2024 she was named the GSport4girls School Sport Star of the Year after leading the South Africa U15 team to their maiden CAF African Schools Football Championship.

== Club career ==
=== Mamelodi Sundowns Ladies Academy ===
Malebane joined the Sundowns Ladies Academy from JVW Girls. In 2022 she played at the Kapstadt Cup with the boys academy. She was part of the team that won their maiden Gauteng ENGEN Knockout Challenge in 2024 and were runners-up to JVW in the Pirates Cup as well as winning the inaugural Gauteng Women's Development League title.

Following the ENGEN, GWDL, and CAF Schools wins she was named the GSport4girls School Sport Star of the Year in 2024.

=== University of Pretoria ===
Malebane moved to SAFA Women's League side University of Pretoria in August 2024.

=== Mamelodi Sundowns Ladies ===
She returned to Sundowns senior team at the start of the 2025 season and made her debut against Richmond United Ladies in a 6–0 win with Malebane scoring the sixth goal for the team. She scored a singe goal in 18 appearances in her debut season.

== Youth international career ==
Malebane captained the South Africa under-15 team at the 2023 COSAFA Schools Cup when they defended their title and qualified for the 2024 CAF African Schools Football Championship. She was also named player of the tournament. They won their maiden CAF African Schools Football Championship in Zanzibar with Malebane captaining the team yet again.

She captained the South Africa under-17 side at the 2024 COSAFA U-17 Girls' Championship where they exited in the group stages. She was also part of the South Africa under-20 at the 2025 COSAFA U-20 Women's Championship assisting the team to a runners-up position to Zambia. Malebane scored two goals in the tournament and was the player of the match in a 5–2 win against Angola.

== International career ==
In February 2025 she made her debut for the senior team in a friendly match against Lesotho.

== Personal life ==
Malebane was born on 22 January 2009 to Wilfred and Nomsa Malebane in Boksburg, South Africa. She is of Pedi descent. In 2022 she was selected as a ball girl for the 2022 Women's Africa Cup of Nations final between South Africa and Morocco.

== Honours ==
South Africa

- COSAFA U-20 Women's Championship runners-up: 2025
- CAF African Schools Football Championship: 2024
- COSAFA Schools Cup: 2023

Mamelodi Sundowns Ladies

- SAFA Women's League: 2025

Mamelodi Sundowns Ladies Academy

- Gauteng Women's Development League: 2023
- Gauteng ENGEN Knockout Challenge: 2024
- Pirates Cup runners-up: 2024

Individual

- 2023 COSAFA Schools Cup: Player of the Tournament
- 2024 GSport4girls: School Sport Star of the Year
