= Danone Nations Cup =

- Organiser(s): Danone
- Founded: 2000
- Region: Worldwide
- Teams: 32 (qualifiers)
- Current champions: Boys: Mexico (3rd title); Girls: Spain (1st title) (2019)
- Most championships: Boys: Mexico France (3 titles each); Girls: Brazil France Spain (1 title each)
- Website: Official website (in English, French, and Spanish)

The Danone Nations Cup is a football tournament for children between the ages of 10 and 15. It is organized since 2000 on the initiative of Danone.

Every year, 2.5 million children from over 34,000 schools and 11,000 clubs from around the globe take part in local, regional and then national Danone Nations Cup competitions, before the winners fly off to compete in the grand World Final. In each of the 32 participating countries, Danone's subsidiaries organize their national tournaments in partnership with the local Sports Federations and/or State Education and Sports Ministers.

For 10 years, the tournament has had Zinédine Zidane as its ambassador.

== History ==
Following the 1998 FIFA World Cup in France, Danone decided to create an international football tournament for children.

Danone Nations Cup World Final was in France (Paris or Lyon) until 2009. The World Finals of the 10th and 11th editions took place at the Orlando Stadium in Johannesburg, South Africa: the same year as the FIFA Football World Cup. The Santiago Bernabéu Stadium in Madrid in 2011 and the National Stadium in Warsaw in 2012 also hosted the competition. For the 14th edition, the thirty, two winning national teams played at Wembley Stadium in London. In 2014, the World Cup of the young people took place in Brazil.

In 2013, the final was goalless (0-0) but France overcame Brazil after a penalty shoot-out. France won its 3rd Danone Nations Cup. South Africa, France and Mexico are the only teams to have won the tournament 3 times each.

== Results ==
=== Boys ===
Year	Venue	Champion	Runner up	Third place	Fourth Place
2000	(France) Parc des Princes, Paris	France	Turkey	Ukraine	Poland
2001	(France) Parc des Princes, Paris	Réunion	Netherlands	France	Argentina
2002	(France) Parc des Princes, Paris	Argentina	Netherlands	South Africa	Germany
2003	(France) Parc des Princes, Paris	South Africa	Portugal	France	Austria
2004	(France) Parc des Princes, Paris	Spain	Switzerland	South Africa	Turkey
2005	(France) Stade de Gerland, Lyon	Russia	Turkey	Mexico	Czech Republic
2006	(France) Stade de Gerland, Lyon	Réunion	Switzerland	Argentina	Indonesia
2007	(France) Stade de Gerland, Lyon	South Africa	France	Turkey	Réunion
2008	(France) Parc des Princes, Paris	France	Russia	Germany	Czech Republic
2009	(South Africa) Orlando Stadium, Johannesburg	South Africa	Switzerland	Brazil	Japan
2010	(South Africa) Orlando Stadium, Johannesburg	Mexico	Uruguay	Brazil	France
2011	(Spain) Santiago Bernabéu, Madrid	Brazil	Thailand	Chile	Russia
2012	(Poland) National Stadium, Warsaw	South Korea	Japan	Switzerland	Argentina
2013	(England) Wembley Stadium, London	France	Brazil	Japan	Republic of Ireland
2014	(Brazil) Arena Corinthians, São Paulo	Japan	Paraguay	Chile	Russia
2015	(Morocco) Stade de Marrakech, Marrakesh	Morocco	Mexico	France	Netherlands
2016	Stade de France, Saint-Denis	Germany	Japan	Spain	Brazil
2017	(United States) Red Bull Arena, Harrison, NJ	Mexico	Argentina	Morocco	Romania
2018	(Spain) RCDE Stadium, Barcelona	Brazil	Hungary	France	Bulgaria
2019	(Spain) RCDE Stadium, Barcelona	Mexico	Spain	France	Indonesia
2020					
2021					

==== Participating nations ====
Legend

- 1st – Champions
- 2nd – Runners-up
- 3rd – Third place
- 4th – Fourth place
- SF – Losing semi-finals
- QF – Quarter-finals
- GS – Group stage
- Q — Qualified for upcoming tournament
- • – Did not qualify
- × – Withdrew
- – Hosts

Team	(France) 2000	(France) 2001	(France) 2002	(France) 2003	(France) 2004	(France) 2005	(France) 2006	(France) 2007	(France) 2008	(South Africa) 2009	(South Africa) 2010	(Spain) 2011	(Poland) 2012	(England) 2013	(Brazil) 2014	(Morocco) 2015	(France) 2016	(United States) 2017	(Spain) 2018	(Spain) 2019	Years
France	1st	3rd																			1
Turkey	2nd	R16																			1
Ukraine	3rd (Note: Ukraine was represented by the Atlant youth football club from Kremenchuk, a winner of the Ukrainian Leather Ball tournament among under-12 football teams.)																				1
Poland	3rd	GS																			1
Romania	GS	QF																			1
Bulgaria	GS	GS																			1
South Africa	GS	QF																			1
Italy	GS	R16																			1
Réunion		1st																			1
Netherlands		2nd																			1
Argentina		4th																			1
Mexico		QF																			1
Canada		QF																			1
Spain		R16																			1
Brazil		R16																			1
Tunisia		R16																			1
Australia		R16																			1
Germany		R16																			1
Morocco		R16																			1
Czech Republic		GS																			1
Japan		GS																			1
Russia		GS																			1
Portugal		GS																			1
United States		GS																			1
Belgium		GS																			1
Indonesia		GS		24th	26th	11th	4th	29th	28th	6th	16th	33rd	23rd	8th	7th	14th	11th	8th	11th	4th	1
Total (12 Teams)	8	24																			

=== Girls ===
Year	Venue	Champion	Runner up	Third place	Fourth Place
2017	(United States) Red Bull Arena, Harrison, NJ	Brazil	Canada	United States	France
2018	(Spain) RCDE Stadium, Barcelona	France	Italy	Spain	United States
2019	(Spain) RCDE Stadium, Barcelona	Spain	France	Argentina	Japan
2020					
2021					

==== Participating nations ====
Legend

- 1st – Champions
- 2nd – Runners-up
- 3rd – Third place
- 4th – Fourth place
- SF – Losing semi-finals
- QF – Quarter-finals
- GS – Group stage
- Q — Qualified for upcoming tournament
- • – Did not qualify
- × – Withdrew
- – Hosts

Team	(United States) 2017	(Spain) 2018	(Spain) 2019	Years
United States	3rd			1
Canada	2nd			1
France	4th		2nd	1
Italy	GS		GS	1
Brazil	1st			1
Spain	GS		1st	1
Argentina			3rd	1
Japan			4th	1
Uruguay			GS	1
South Africa			GS	1
England			GS	1
Total (12 Teams)	6		8	

== See also ==
- FIFA
