= Ntombifuthi Khumalo =

South African youth soccer coach

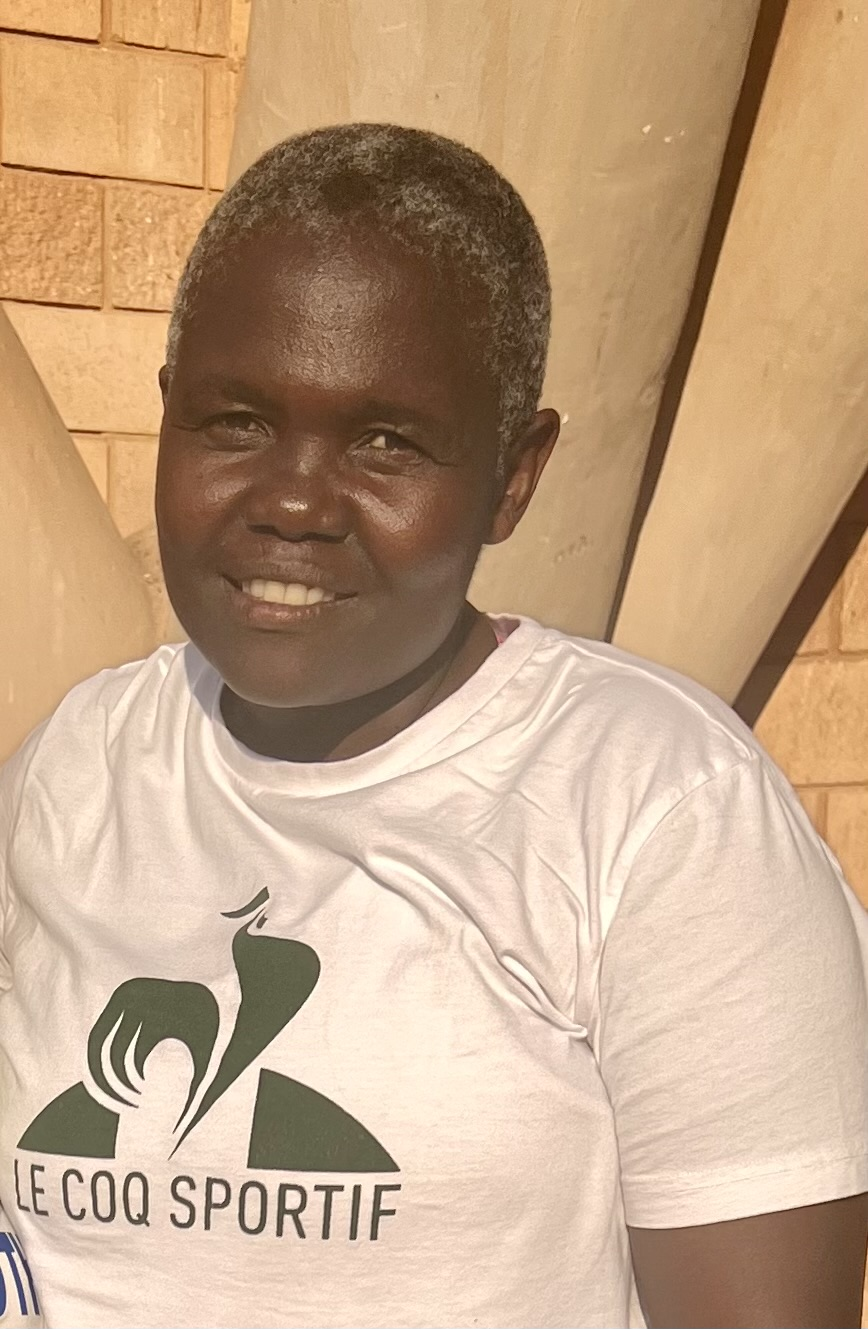
- Coach Khumalo at the Lucas Moripe Stadium in 2024

Personal information
- Place of birth: Pietermaritzburg, South Africa

Team information
- Current team: Edendale Technical High School (head coach); South Africa U/15 (head coach)

Managerial career
- Years: Team
- 2018: Durban Ladies
- 2021–: Edendale Technical High School
- 2022–: South Africa W U/15
- 2024–: South Africa W U/17
- 2025: South Africa W U/20
Medal record
Representing South Africa
CAF African Schools Football Championship
Gold medal – first place	2024 Tanzania
COSAFA U-20 Women's Championship
Silver medal – second place	2025 Namibia	{{{2}}}
COSAFA Schools Cup
Gold medal – first place	2022 Malawi
Gold medal – first place	2023 Zimbabwe
Gold medal – first place	2024 Namibia

Ntombifuthi Khumalo is South African youth soccer manager and current head coach of Edenvale Technical High and the South Africa girls under-15.

In 2024 she became the first South African coach to win the CAF African Schools Football Championship. She has won three consecutive COSAFA Schools Cup in 2022, 2023, and 2024.

== Managerial career ==
=== Durban Ladies ===
In 2018 she led Durban Ladies to the KZN Sasol Women's League title and a runners-up position at the 2018 Sasol League National Championships.

=== Edenvale Technical High ===
Khumalo currently coaches Edendale Technical High. In 2022, her team won the Pan-African National U/16 games and qualified to represent South Africa at the continental finals held in the Democratic Republic of Congo. The finished second in the continental finals losing 1–0 to Morocco in the final. They rounded out the year by winning the schools national winter championship and qualified to represent South African at the inaugural COSAFA Schools Cup held in Malawi. They won the inaugural COSAFA Schools Cup and qualified for the inaugural CAF African Schools Football Championship in 2023.

=== South Africa W U/15 ===
In 2023 her team represented the COSAFA region at the CAF African Schools Football Championship but failed to make it out the group stages. Later in the year, her side defended their COSAFA Schools Cup.

In May 2024 she won the South Africa W U/15's maiden CAF African Schools Football Championship. In October 2024, her side defended the COSAFA Schools Cup for the third consecutive year and qualified for the 2025 CAF African Schools Football Championship.

=== South Africa W U/17 ===
In 2024 she took over the W U/17 team for the 2024 COSAFA U-17 Girls' Championship. The team failed to make it out of the group stages.

In 2025 she led the team in the 2025 African U-17 Women's World Cup qualifiers. Her team won 21–2 on aggregate against Gabon in the first round and lost 5-1 in the second round to Nigeria.

=== South Africa W U/20 ===
She took over the Basetsana team for the 2025 COSAFA U-20 Women's Championship where they finished as runners-ups.

== Honours ==
- CAF African Schools Football Championship: 2024
- COSAFA U-20 Women's Championship: 2025
- COSAFA Schools Cup: 2022, 2023, 2024
- Sasol League National Championship: runners-up: 2018
- KZN Sasol Women's League: 2018
- Pan-African U/16 games: runners-up: 2022
- South African leg Pan-African U/16 games: 2022
