= Rhoda Mulaudzi =

South African soccer player

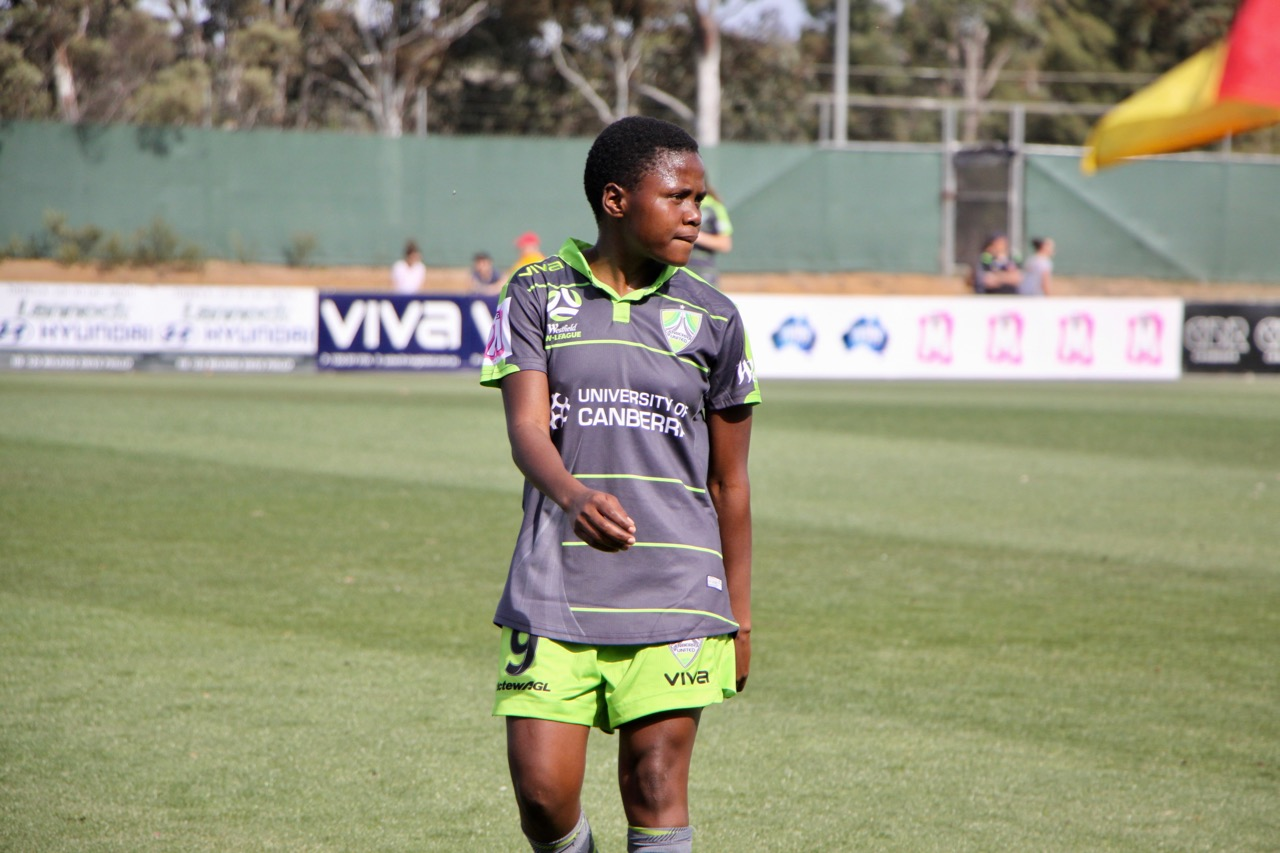
- Mulaudzi in 2018

Personal information
- Date of birth: 2 December 1989 (age 36)
- Place of birth: Venda, Malonga Village, Ha-Muligidi, South Africa
- Height: 1.50 m (4 ft 11 in)
- Position: Forward

Team information
- Current team: Mamelodi Sundowns Ladies (assistant coach)

Senior career*
Years	Team	Apps	(Gls)
- Mamelodi Sundowns Ladies
2018–2019	Canberra United	12	(4)
2019–2020	Apollon Ladies		
2020	Mamelodi Sundowns Ladies	18	(36)
2020–2021	Dinamo Minsk	3	(1)
2021–2025	Mamelodi Sundowns Ladies		

International career^{‡}
2015–2023	South Africa	23	(0)

Managerial career
- 2022–: Mamelodi Sundowns Ladies Academy
- 2024–: South Africa U/17 (assistant)
- 2025–: Mamelodi Sundowns Ladies (assistant coach)
- * Club domestic league appearances and goals as of 6 April 2025 ‡ National team caps and goals as of 6 March 2019

Rhoda Mulaudzi (born 2 December 1989) is a former South African women's soccer player who played as a forward. She is the current assistant coach at Mamelodi Sundowns Ladies and the South Africa women's under-17. She is also a coach for the Mamelodi Sundowns Ladies Academy.

In 2020 she was named the inaugural South African Football Journalists’ Association’s (Safja) Women’s Footballer of the Year.

== Club career ==
=== Canberra United ===
On 20 August 2018, Canberra United announced they had signed Mulaudzi for the 2018–19 W-League Season. She joined the club alongside fellow South African Refiloe Jane; they are the first players from South Africa to play in the W-League.

=== Dinamo Minsk ===
She joined the club in 2020 and won the Belarus Women’s Cup with the club.

=== Mamelodi Sundowns Ladies ===
She joined Sundowns Ladies in 2021 and was part of the team that were runners-up at the 2022 CAF Women's Champions League. She suffered a meniscus injury in the final that kept her on the sidelines for 14-months.

== International career ==
Mulaudzi made her senior debut for South Africa during the 2015 African Games on 7 September that year in a 1–1 draw against Cameroon.

== Managerial career ==
=== Mamelodi Sundowns Ladies Academy ===
Mulaudzi was named the Mamelodi Sundowns Ladies Academy coach for the under 16 side in 2022. She won her maiden trophy as a youth coach at the inaugural Volkswagen Vaya Cup in 2022. She won the inaugural under 14 Gauteng Women's Development League in 2024. In 2025 they won the CAF U-17 Girls Integrated Football Tournament hosted in Zimbabwe.

=== South Africa women's under-17 ===
In December 2024 she was named the assistant coach for the South Africa women's under-17.

== Honours ==
Dinamo Minsk

- Belarus Women's Cup: 2020

Mamelodi Sundowns Ladies

- CAF Women's Champions League: runners-up: 2022
- SAFA Women's League: 2020, 2021, 2022, 2023, 2024

Managerial

- CAF U-17 Girls Integrated Football Tournament: 2025
- Gauteng Sasol Women's League: 2025
- Gauteng Women's Development League U/14: 2024
- Volkswagen Vaya Cup: 2022
- Gauteng Women's Soccer League: 2025

Individual

- South African Football Journalists’ Association’s (Safja) Women’s Footballer of the Year: 2020
