= Travis Mutyaba =

Ugandan footballer (born 2005)

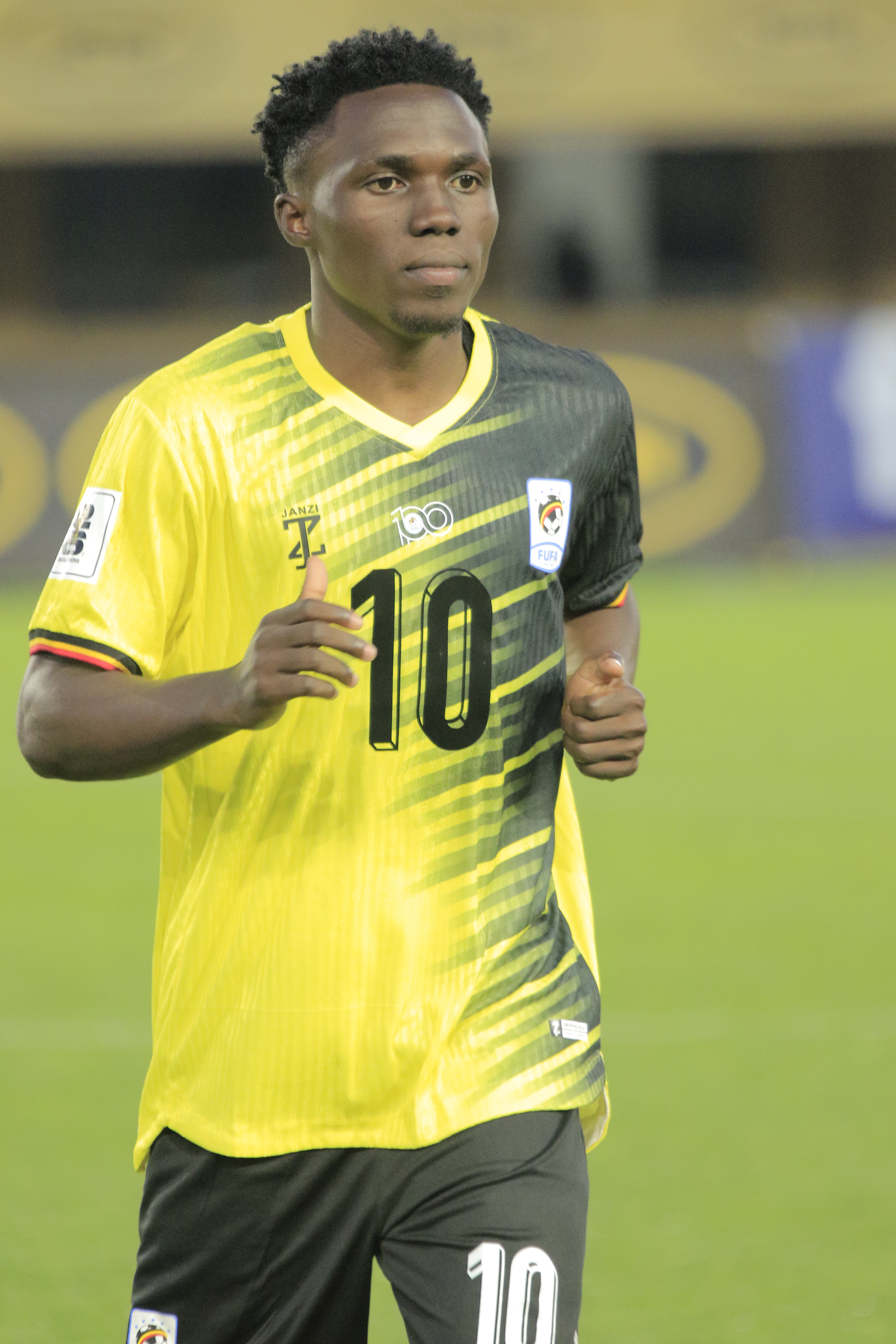
- Mutyaba with Uganda in 2025

Personal information
- Date of birth: 7 August 2005 (age 21)
- Place of birth: Nansana, Uganda
- Height: 1.60 m (5 ft 3 in)
- Positions: Midfielder; centre-forward

Team information
- Current team: CS Sfaxien
- Number: 12

Senior career*
Years	Team	Apps	(Gls)
2021–2024	SC Villa		
2024	→ Zamalek SC (loan)	9	(0)
2024–2025	Bordeaux	21	(0)
2025–	CS Sfaxien	30	(2)

International career^{‡}
2023	Uganda U20	4	(0)
2021–	Uganda	34	(3)
- * Club domestic league appearances and goals as of 02 September 2026 ‡ National team caps and goals as of 7 August 2026

Travis Mutyaba (born 7 August 2005) is a Ugandan professional footballer who plays for Tunisian Ligue Professionnelle 1 club CS Sfaxien and the Uganda national team.

== Club career ==
In August 2021 Mutyaba signed a three-year contract with Uganda Premier League club SC Villa. Prior to signing for Villa, he played for the junior team of Vipers SC and Synergy FC of the Futsal Super League, in which he was one of the league's top scorers. By December 2021, he had reportedly drawn interest from clubs in Italy and France.

Mutyaba currently plays for CS Sfaxien in Tunisia. He made his debut for the team on 10 August 2025, scoring during the half-hour mark stoppage time in a 1–2 home defeat against ES Zarzis.

== International career ==
In 2019 Mutyaba was part of the Uganda under–15 team that won the 2019 CECAFA U-15 Championship in Eritrea. In the team's second match of the group stage, he scored his team's only two goals in a victory over Tanzania. He scored again in a 4–0 victory over Kenya in the final to help clinch the title. The following year he was named the Most Valuable Player as Uganda won the 2020 CECAFA U-17 Championship held in Rwanda.

Mutyaba was called up to the senior national team for a friendly against Tanzania at age 16. He went on to make his senior debut in the eventual 2–0 victory. In January 2022 he was called up again for five friendlies with national sides from Europe and Asia as the Cranes traveled to Turkey, Iraq, and Bahrain.

On December 7, 2025, he was selected by Paul Put for Uganda's squad to participate in the 2025 Africa Cup of Nations.

== Career statistics ==
=== International ===
As of match played 30 December 2025

Appearances and goals by national team and year
National team	Year	Apps	Goals
Uganda	2021	1	0
Uganda	2022	4	1
Uganda	2023	8	0
Uganda	2024	10	2
Uganda	2025	11	0
Total		34	3

Scores and results list Uganda's goal tally first, score column indicates score after each Mutyaba goal.

List of international goals scored by Travis Mutyaba for Uganda youth teams
No.	Date	Venue	Opponent	Score	Result	Competition	Ref.
1	19 August 2019	Cicero Stadium, Asmara, Eritrea	Tanzania U15	1–0	2–0	2019 CECAFA U-15 Championship	|
2	19 August 2019	Cicero Stadium, Asmara, Eritrea	Tanzania U15	2–0	2–0	2019 CECAFA U-15 Championship	|
3	23 August 2019	Cicero Stadium, Asmara, Eritrea	South Sudan U15	4–0	5–0	2019 CECAFA U-15 Championship	
4	30 August 2019	Cicero Stadium, Asmara, Eritrea	Kenya U15	2–0	4–0	2019 CECAFA U-15 Championship	
5	16 December 2020	Umuganda Stadium, Gisenyi, Rwanda	Kenya U17	4–0	5–0	2020 CECAFA U-17 Championship	
6	22 December 2020	Umuganda Stadium, Gisenyi, Rwanda	Tanzania U17	2–1	3–1	2020 CECAFA U-17 Championship	

List of international goals scored by Travis Mutyaba for Uganda senior team
No.	Date	Venue	Opponent	Score	Result	Competition
1	28 August 2022	Benjamin Mkapa Stadium, Dar es Salaam, Tanzania	Tanzania	1–0	1–0	2022 African Nations Championship qualification
2	10 June 2024	Mandela National Stadium, Kampala, Uganda	Algeria	1–0	1–2	2026 FIFA World Cup qualification
3	19 November 2024	Stade Alphonse Massemba-Débat, Brazzaville, Congo	Congo	1–0	1–0	2026 Africa Cup of Nations qualification
