= Eritrea national under-15 football team =

Men's association football team representing Eritrea

Eritrea
- Association: Eritrean National Football Federation
- Confederation: CAF (Africa)
- Sub-confederation: CECAFA (East & Central Africa)
- Head coach: (Eritrea) Mekonen Zewde
- Top scorer: Ahmed Awad (5)
- Home stadium: Cicero Stadium
- FIFA code: ERI

First international
- Eritrea 1–2 Burundi (Asmara, Eritrea; 16 August 2019)

Biggest win
- Eritrea 6–0 Sudan (Asmara, Eritrea; 20 December 2019)

Biggest defeat
- Eritrea 1–2 Burundi (Asmara, Eritrea; 16 August 2019); Eritrea 1–2 Kenya (Asmara, Eritrea; 22 August 2019)

The Eritrea national under-15 football team represents Eritrea in tournaments and friendly matches at the under-15 level. The team hosted the first-ever CECAFA U-15 Championship in 2019.

== Competitive record ==
CECAFA U-15 Championship
Year	Round	Position	Pld	W	D	L	GF	GA	Pts
(Eritrea) 2019	Group Stage	3rd in Group A	4	1	1	2	8	4	4
Total	0 Titles	0/1	4	1	1	2	8	4	4

== List of matches ==
=== 2019 CECAFA U-15 Championship ===
16 August 2019 Group Stage	Eritrea	1–2	Burundi	Asmara, Eritrea
	Ahmed Awad	Report	Interiteka Florien 2'; Nduwimana Patrick	Stadium: Cicero Stadium

20 August 2019 Group Stage	Eritrea	6–0	Sudan	Asmara, Eritrea
	Tesfay Temesgen 10', Esrom Rezene 20'; Ahmed Awad,,	Report		Stadium: Cicero Stadium

22 August 2019 Group Stage	Eritrea	1–2	Kenya	Asmara, Eritrea
	Ahmed Awad 55'	Report	Kavin Wangaya 25'; Mwaro Ibrahim 90'	Stadium: Cicero Stadium

24 August 2019 Group Stage	Eritrea	1–1	Somalia	Asmara, Eritrea
	Tesfay Temesgen	Report; Report	Sabir Hassan Mustaf 46'	Stadium: Cicero Stadium
