= Gauteng Football Association =

SAFA
- Short name: SAFA Gauteng
- Founded: 2006; 20 years ago
- Headquarters: Pretoria, Gauteng, South Africa
- Membership: SAFA Ekurhuleni SAFA Johannesburg; SAFA Metsweding; SAFA Sedibeng; SAFA Tshwane SAFA West Rand
- President: Pius Nqandela
- Vice-President: Job Mchunu
- Website: safagauteng.org.za

The Gauteng Football Association (colloquially known as SAFA Gauteng) is the provincial administrative governing body that controls the sport of football in the province of Gauteng and is governed by the South Africa Football Association (SAFA).

== Member regions ==
SAFA Gauteng is made up of six member regions namely, Ekurhuleni, Johannesburg, Metsweding, Sedibeng, Tshwane, and West Rand.

== Competitions ==
Competition	Age group	Year	Champions	Title	Runners-up
Teams
Gauteng Women's League		2026	Mamelodi Sundowns Ladies Academy	2nd	Witwatersrand University
Gauteng ABC Motsepe		2025–2026	La Masia F.C.	2nd	Free Agents
Gauteng Development League	Under-19	2026	Mamelodi Sundowns Academy	3rd	Kaizer Chiefs Development
Gauteng Development League	Under-17	2026	Mamelodi Sundowns Academy	4th	Kaizer Chiefs Development
Gauteng Development League	Under-15	2026	Mamelodi Sundowns Academy	4th	Kaizer Chiefs Development
Gauteng Development League	Under-14	2026	Kaizer Chiefs Development	2nd	Mamelodi Sundowns Academy
Gauteng Development League	Under-13	2026	Mamelodi Sundowns Academy	2nd	Future of Africa
Gauteng Women's Development League	Under-17	2026	Mamelodi Sundowns Ladies Academy	4th	Refilwe
Gauteng Women's Development League	Under-15	2026	Mamelodi Sundowns Ladies Academy	2nd	Panorama
Gauteng Women's Development League	Under-13	2026	Mamelodi Sundowns Ladies Academy	1st	JVW Girls
Gauteng Development Promotional League	Under-19	2026	Platinum Stars	1st	NWU Vaal
Gauteng Development Promotional League	Under-17	2026	TS Galaxy	1st	Pretoria Athletic
Gauteng Development Promotional League	Under-15	2026	Hellenic Falcons	1st	Young Lions
Gauteng Development Promotional League	Under-14	2026	TS Galaxy	1st	Hellenic Falcons
Gauteng Development Promotional League	Under-13	2026	TS Galaxy	1st	Elspark United Academy
GDL Top 8	Under-19	2026	Kaizer Chiefs Development	1st	Remember Elite Sports Academy
GDL Top 8	Under-17	2026	Siwelele	1st	Kaizer Chiefs Development
GDL Top 8	Under-15	2026	Mamelodi Sundowns Academy	3rd	Siwelele
GDL Top 8	Under-13	2026	Mamelodi Sundowns Academy	1st	Siwelele
GWDL Top 8	Under-17	2026	Mamelodi Sundowns Ladies Academy	2nd	Refilwe
GWDL Top 8	Under-15	2026	Panorama	1st	Tuks High School
GWDL Top 8	Under-13	2026	Mamelodi Sundowns Ladies Academy	1st	Refilwe

== Provincial teams ==
In 2024, Gauteng won both the boys and girls national championships at the U15 TDS Interprovincial Tournament.

== Controversies ==
In 2024 SAFA Sedibeng delayed the Gauteng ABC Motsepe league playoffs after two of its LFAs, Emfuleni LFA and Midvaal LFA, registered players outside the window period stipulated in the SAFA Competitions Uniform Rules.
