= Lonathemba Mhlongo =

South African soccer player

Personal information
- Full name: Lonathemba Mhlongo
- Date of birth: 23 August 2002 (age 24)
- Place of birth: Pietermaritzburg, Kwa-Zulu Natal, South Africa
- Height: 1.56 m (5 ft 1 in)
- Position: Defender

Team information
- Current team: Western Cape University
- Number: 16

Youth career
- Edendale Technical High School

Senior career*
Years	Team	Apps	(Gls)
- Durban
2022–	University of the Western Cape		

International career
2018	South Africa U17		
2020–	South Africa		
- * Club domestic league appearances and goals

Lonathemba Mhlongo (born 23 August 2002) is a South African soccer player who plays as a defender for Western Cape University and the South Africa national team.

== Early life and education ==
Mhlongo was born in Pietermaritzburg, KwaZulu-Natal, South Africa. She attended high school at Edendale Technical High School in Pietermaritzburg, where she captained the school's women's soccer team. She has a Higher Certificate in Economic Development from University of the Western Cape (UWC).

== Career ==
Mhlongo captained the Edendale Technical High School soccer team while developing through grassroots programs. In 2018, she was selected for the South Africa U-17 Women's National Team (Bantwana). She was in the training camps and qualifiers for 2018 FIFA U-17 Women's World Cup.

In 2020, she was selected for the COSAFA Women's Championship. Her debut game was against Angola, where she scored a goal. In 2021, she joined Durban Ladies in the SAFA Women's League (Hollywoodbets Super League). In 2022, she was selected on the preliminary list for Banyana Banyana for the 2022 Women's Africa Cup of Nations. She was selected to play for Banyana Banyana's first game after winning the 2022 Women's Africa Cup of Nations, their game was against Brazil.

She played one game at the 2024 Women's Africa Cup of Nations. Her appearance came in the group-stage match against Tanzania.

== See also ==
- Banyana Banyana
- Women's Africa Cup of Nations
- COSAFA Women's Championship
