= Mfundo Vilakazi =

South African soccer player (born 2005)

Personal information
- Full name: Mfundo Vilakazi
- Date of birth: 19 November 2005 (age 20)
- Place of birth: Soweto, South Africa
- Height: 1.65 m (5 ft 5 in)
- Position: Midfielder

Team information
- Current team: Kaizer Chiefs
- Number: 28

Youth career
- 2021–2023: Kaizer Chiefs Development

Senior career*
Years	Team	Apps	(Gls)
2024–	Kaizer Chiefs	53	(6)

International career
2023–2025	South Africa U20	5	
2026–	South Africa U23	2	(0)
- * Club domestic league appearances and goals

Mfundo "Obrigado" Vilakazi (born 19 November 2005) is a South African soccer player who plays as a midfielder for South African Premiership side Kaizer Chiefs.

== Club careers ==
=== Kaizer Chiefs ===
Vilakazi joined Kaizer Chiefs Reserve in 2021 and played in the Gauteng Development League and PSL Reserve before signing his professional contract with the senior side in 2024.

== Youth international career ==
Vilakazi competed with the South Africa U-20 team at the 2025 U-20 Arica Cup of Nations. He helped the side win their maiden U-20 Africa Cup of Nations and qualify for the 2025 U-20 FIFA World Cup.

He was voted the man of the match in a 5–0 win against New Caledonia at the 2025 U-20 FIFA World Cup providing two assists.

== Personal life ==
Vilakazi was born in Soweto to Sabelo Dlamini and an unnamed mother. He attended Jabulani Technical High School.

== Honours ==
South Africa U-20

- U-20 Africa Cup of Nations: 2025
