= CECAFA Schools Cup =

Youth regional football tournament

- Organiser(s): CECAFA
- Founded: 2022; 4 years ago
- Region: East Africa
- Teams: 8
- Qualifier for: CAF African Schools Football Championship
- Current champions: Boys: Uganda; Girls: Ethiopia
- Most championships: Boys: Uganda (3 titles); Girls: Uganda (2 titles)
- Website: https://cecafaonline.com/

The CECAFA Schools Cup also known as the CAF African Schools Football Championship CECAFA qualifiers is an annual schools association football competition launched in 2022 as qualification for the CAF African Schools Football Championship organised by CECAFA for its nations.

== History ==
The inaugural tournament was held in Chamazi, Tanzania. Uganda’s Royal Giant High School won the boys edition against Geda Roble Secondary School from Ethiopia 4–2 via penalties after the match ended in a goalless draw. In the girls edition, Tanzania's Fountain Gate Dodoma Secondary School defeated Awaro Senior Secondary from Ethiopia 3–0 in the final played at the Azam Stadium.

The second edition was hosted in Nairobi, Kenya from 11–13 December 2023. Uganda won the boys edition 4–2 via penalties against Tanzania after the match ended in a 1–1 draw. The girls edition was also won by Uganda winning 2–1 against hosts Kenya.

The third edition was hosted in Kitende, Uganda from 10–12 December 2024. Tanzania won the boys edition after finishing tied on 6 points with Uganda but with a superior goal difference. The girls edition was won by Uganda after being tied with Tanzania on seven points but also with a superior goal difference.

== Results ==
=== Boys ===
Season	Champion	Points	Runner-up	Refs.
2022	(Uganda) Royal Giant High School	0–0 (4–2 p)	(Ethiopia) Geda Roble Secondary School	
2023	Uganda	1–1 (4–2 p)	Tanzania	
2024	Tanzania	6	Uganda	
2025	Uganda	0–0 (3–2 p)	Ethiopia	

=== Girls ===
Season	Champion	Points	Runner-up	Refs.
2022	(Tanzania) Fountain Gate Dodoma Secondary School	3–0	(Ethiopia) Awaro Senior Secondary School	
2023	Uganda	2–1	Kenya	
2024	Uganda	7	Tanzania	
2025	Ethiopia	0–0 (5–4 p)	Tanzania	

== Awards ==
The following players were awarded best in the tournament:

=== Boys ===
Tournament	Player of the Tournament	Golden Boot	Goals	Golden Glove	Fair Play
2022	(Ethiopia) Kabe Buzuna Biruk	(South Sudan) Ajo Minari Alex Lomoro	7	(Ethiopia) Dawit Biruk Bekel	(Sudan) Aljeel Al Genina
2023	(Uganda) Achraf Kyakuwa	(Uganda) Simon Wanyama		(Tanzania) Abraham Nassor	Kenya
2024	(Uganda) Ashraf Kyakuwa	not awarded	1	(Burundi) Jean Marie Irakiza	Tanzania
2025	(Uganda) Henry Muhoozi	(Uganda) Nabil Kajumba	7	(Burundi) Ramadhan Ngendabanyikwa	Burundi

=== Girls ===
Tournament	Player of the Tournament	Golden Boot	Goals	Golden Glove	Fair Play
2022	(Tanzania) Zainabu Dotto Karuka	(Tanzania) Winfrida Gerald	6	(Tanzania) Allic Nelson Nechemia	(Djibouti) CEM Boulaus
2023	(Kenya) Lindey Weey Atieno	(Uganda) Shadia Nabirye		(Uganda) Huda Ayikeru	Kenya
2024	(Burundi) Ella Louange Kezimana	(Uganda) Brendah Nassaka	4	(Uganda) Haira Naboosa	Rwanda
2025	(Uganda) Lydia Namaseruka	(Tanzania) Hajra Mawanja	6	(Tanzania) Lukia Seleman	Uganda
