= Clapham High School =

Coordinates: 25.7313°S 28.2433°E

Location
- Soutpansberg Road, Queenswood; Pretoria, Gauteng; South Africa

Information
- School type: Public school
- Motto: Moving to good to great
- Established: 1948; 78 years ago
- School district: District 4
- School number: 012 333 6011
- Headmaster: Noreen Schutte
- Staff: 100 full-time
- Grades: 8–12
- Gender: Boys & Girls
- Age: 14 to 18
- Enrollment: 1,300 pupils
- Language: English
- Schedule: 07:30 - 14:00
- Campus: Urban Campus
- Campus type: Suburban
- Houses: Bowers; Evans; Oates; Scott; Wilson
- Colours: Maroon; White
- Rivals: The Glen High School; Rietondale High School
- Accreditation: Gauteng Department of Education
- Website: claphamhighschool.co.za

Clapham High School is a public, English-speaking high school in Queenswood, Pretoria, in the Gauteng province of South Africa. The school moved out of central Pretoria to the present facilities in Queenswood, beginning of 1955, and has approximately 1300 pupils.

== History ==
The boys U/15 soccer team won the 2022 Football Championship held in Benoni, Gauteng. The win qualified them to represent South Africa at the COSAFA Schools Cup. In 2023 they won the COSAFA Schools Cup 1–0 against Salima Secondary School from Malawi and advanced to the inaugural CAF African Schools Football Championship. They lost the CAF African Schools Football Championship final 5-4 via penalties to CS Ben Sekou Sylla from Guinea after the match ended in a 1–1 draw.

They ended the 2023 season with the boys U/15 soccer team crowned the inaugural Gauteng Schools Football Champions League champions.

== Sport ==
The school intra-sport teams are divided into houses which are named after the members of the Terra Nova Expedition: Scott, Wilson, Evans, Bowers, and Oates.

Sport is not compulsory, as the school believes that success and enjoyment comes with voluntary participation. However, the grade 8 learners are expected to attend most of the sport meetings as spectators. The school offers the following sports:

- Basketball
- Netball
- Soccer

Clapham High School is part of the Pretoria English Medium High Schools Athletics Association which is good-spirited rivalry between all the co-ed government schools in Pretoria. The schools have three meetings held a year including the swimming gala (held at Hillcrest Swimming Pool), cross country (held at the host school) and an athletics meeting (held at Pilditch Stadium). Other schools participating in the association are:

- Hillview High School
- Lyttelton Manor High School
- Pretoria Technical High School
- Pretoria Secondary School
- Rietondale High School
- Sutherland High School, Centurion
- The Glen High School
- Willowridge High School

== Honours ==
- CAF African Schools Football Championship: Runners-Up: 2023
- COSAFA Schools Cup: 2022
- Football Championship: 2022
- Gauteng Schools Football Champions League: 2023

== Notable alums ==
- Percy Tau
- Errol Musk
