= COSAFA Schools Cup =

Youth regional football tournament

- Organiser(s): COSAFA
- Founded: 2022; 4 years ago
- Region: Southern Africa
- Teams: 8
- Qualifier for: CAF African Schools Football Championship
- Current champions: Boys: Zambia; Girls: Zambia
- Most championships: Boys: South Africa (3 titles); Girls: South Africa (3 titles)
- Website: https://cosafa.com/category/cosafa-schools-cup/

The COSAFA Schools Cup also known as the CAF African Schools Football Championship COSAFA qualifiers is an annual schools association football competition launched in 2022 as qualification for the CAF African Schools Football Championship organised by COSAFA for its nations.

== History ==
The inaugural tournament was held from 29–31 October 2022 in Lilongwe, Malawi. South Africa's Clapham High School won the boys edition 1-0 against Salima Secondary School from Malawi. In the girls edition, South Africa's Edendale Technical High School completed the double when they won 4-0 against Mothamo JSS from Botswana.

The second edition was hosted by Gateway High School in Zimbabwe from 14–16 December 2023. South Africa won the boys edition 3-0 via penalties against Malawi after the match ended in a goalless draw. The girls edition was also won by South Africa winning 3-1 against Botswana.

The third edition was hosted at Walvis Bay in Namibia from 11–13 October 2024. South Africa won the boys edition 4-2 via penalties against Zambia after the match ended in a 1-1 draw. The girls edition was also won by South Africa winning 3-1 against Malawi.

The fourth edition was hosted at Idas Valley Sports Complex in Stellenbosch, South Africa from 5–7 December 2025. Zambia won their maiden title defeating defending champions South Africa 2–1 in the boys final. They completed the double in the girls final with a 1–0 win against South Africa.

== Results ==
=== Boys ===
Season	Champion	Score	Runner-up	Refs.
2022	(South Africa) Clapham High School	1–0	(Malawi) Salima Secondary School	
2023	South Africa	0–0 (3–0 p)	Malawi	
2024	South Africa	1–1 (4–2 p)	Zambia	
2025	Zambia	2–1	South Africa	

=== Girls ===
Season	Champion	Score	Runner-up	Refs.
2022	(South Africa) Edendale Technical High School	4–0	(Botswana) Mothamo JSS	
2023	South Africa	3–1	Botswana	
2024	South Africa	3–1	Malawi	
2025	Zambia	1–0	South Africa	

== Awards ==
The following players were awarded best in the tournament:

=== Boys ===
Tournament	Player of the Tournament	Golden Boot	Goals	Golden Glove	Fair Play
2022	(South Africa) Kgaogelo Monanyane	(Malawi) Ishumael Bwanali	5	(South Africa) Kamogelo Phokela	(Angola) Rosinha
2023	(South Africa) Simama Inganathi	(Zimbabwe) El Shaddai Sadomba	6	(South Africa) Sabrie Losper	Zimbabwe
2024	(Zambia) Tenani Simfukwe	(Malawi) Okester Kanyenda	4	(Zambia) William Zulu	South Africa
2025	(Zambia) Maxen Msimuko	(Zambia) Charles Sitali	4	(Zambia) Christopher Wamudila	Malawi

=== Girls ===
Tournament	Player of the Tournament	Golden Boot	Goals	Golden Glove	Fair Play
2022	(Malawi) Victoria Nkwala	(South Africa) Nobahle Mdelwa	7	(Malawi) Emily Maulidi	(Seychelles) Anse Boileau
2023	(South Africa) Katleho Malebane	(South Africa) Khwezi Khoza	11	(South Africa) Angel Zibula	Namibia
2024	(South Africa) Leonay Kock	(South Africa) Leonay Kock	11	(South Africa) Mia Heneke	Malawi
2025	(Zambia) Hilda Kangwa	(Zambia) Dee Mapuwa	6	(Zambia) Winfridah Mutale	Malawi
