= Gerald Malinga =

South African Air Force officer (born 1957)

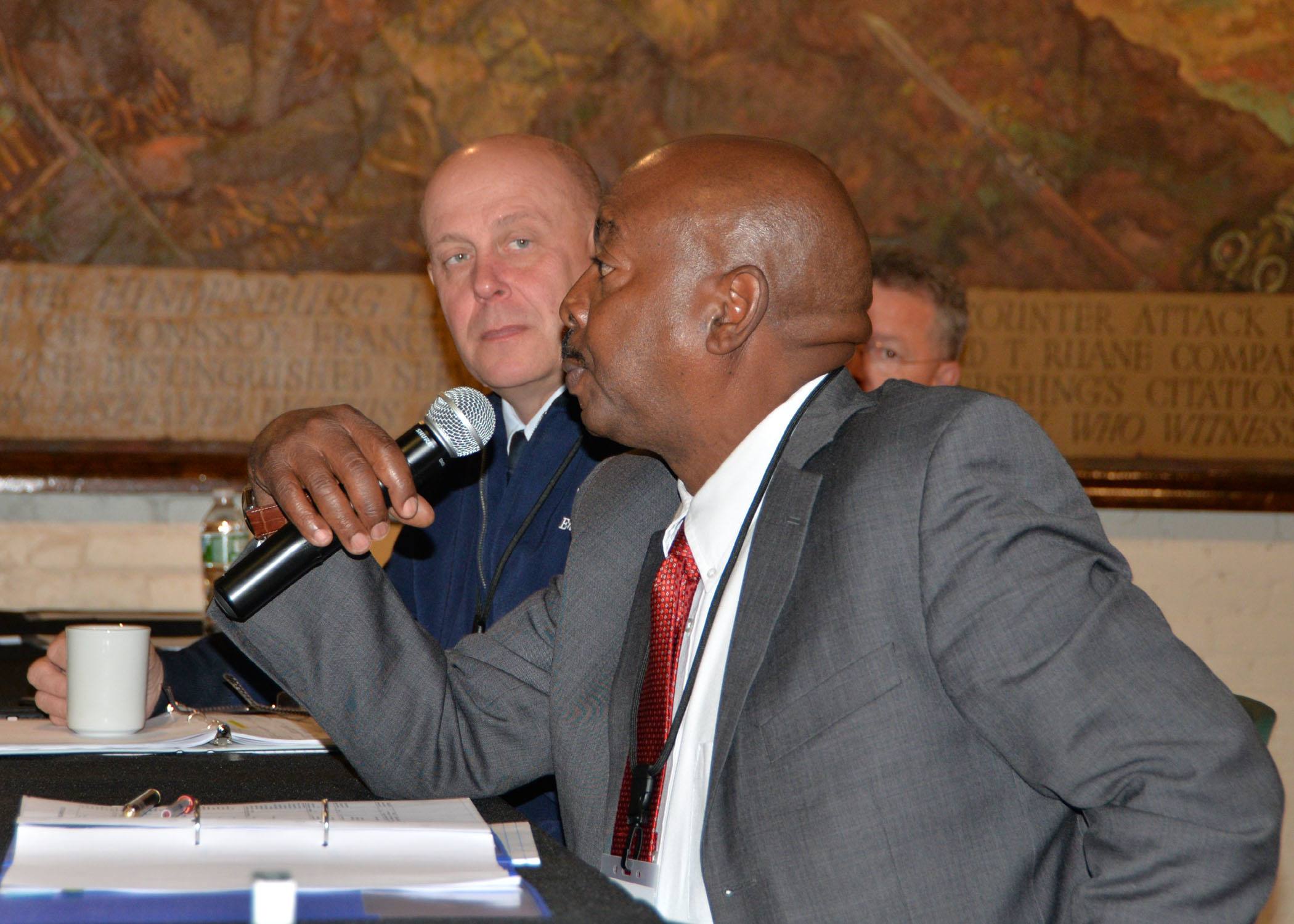
- Born: 18 May 1957 (age 69)
- Military career
- Allegiance: South Africa
- Branch: South African Air Force
- Rank: Major General
- Commands: Deputy Chief of the Air Force; 21 Squadron; 41 Squadron

Major General Gerald Malinga is a South African Air Force officer, currently serving as Deputy Chief of the Air Force. Born 18 May 1957 in Johannesburg, he attended school in Soweto and became a student activist while still in high school. In 1975, he became a member of the Azanian People's Liberation Army.

In 1976, he left South Africa, joining APLA for military training in exile and was chosen to be trained as a pilot. In 1980, he obtained his commercial pilot's license. He integrated into the South African National Defence Force with the rank of lieutenant colonel in the South African Air Force in 1995. He joined the 41st Squadron in 1996 and was appointed to the position of commanding officer in 1998. After attending the Senior Command and Staff Course, he joined 21 Squadron before being promoted to colonel and being assigned as commanding officer in 2002.

In January 2004, after being promoted to brigadier general, he was appointed Director of Education, Training and Development. He then moved to the post of Chief Director Force Preparation in March 2005, with a promotion to major general, before being posted to the Joint Operations Division in June 2006 as the Chief Director of Operations Development.

In November 2010, he was appointed as general officer commanding, Air Command, before being appointed to his current post in November 2011.

== Education ==
He was awarded a Bachelor of Arts in business administration from Stillman College in 1991.

Military offices
Unknown	Deputy Chief of the SAAF; 2011-2017	Succeeded by M.O. Mcetywa
Unknown	GOC Air Command; 2010-2011	Unknown
Preceded by M.P. Janse van Rensburg	Chief Director Operational Development CJ Ops; 2006-2010	Succeeded by George Mphafi
Preceded by Mandla Mangethe	Chief Director Force Prep SAAF; 2005-2006	Succeeded by Desmond Barker
