= The Glen High School =

Coordinates: 25°47′23.27″S 28°16′47.28″E

- The Glen High School crest

Location
- Corobay Avenue & Garsfontein Road; Pretoria, Gauteng; South Africa

Information
- School type: Public school
- Motto: Urram (Scottish: "Respect With Honour")
- Established: 26 January 1976; 50 years ago
- Founder: Mr GM Batty
- Principal: Mrs CW Nel
- Staff: approx. 50 full-time
- Grades: 8–12
- Gender: Boys & Girls
- Age: 14 to 18
- Enrollment: 1,200+ pupils
- Language: English
- Schedule: 07:30 - 14:15
- Campus: Urban Campus
- Campus type: Suburban
- Houses: Campbell; Gordon; McDonald; Stewart
- Colours: Green; White
- Song: The Glen Air
- Nickname: Glenwegians
- Rivals: Clapham High School; Hillview High School; Lyttelton Manor High School; Rietondale High School; Willowridge High School
- Accreditation: Gauteng Department of Education
- School fees: R23,000 (tuition)
- Badge: The coat-of-arms is a thistle with the incorporation of the main School and clan colours.
- Website: theglenhighschool.co.za

The Glen High School is a public English medium co-educational high school situated in the suburb of Waterkloof Glen in Pretoria in the Gauteng province of South Africa. It has around 1,200 pupils.

== Principals ==
- G Batty - from January 1976
- R Brown
- A Wilcocks 1990 - 1998
- A Brink
- C Nel 2012–Present

== Scottish background ==
The Glen High School has a Scottish background and the Heads of Clans have a kilt as part of their uniform. The President, Deputy-President, Treasurer and Secretary wear tartan ties.

== Sport ==
Sport is not compulsory, although grade 8 learners are expected to attend most of the sport meetings as spectators.

Facilities include a 25-metre swimming pool, tennis and squash courts, a basketball court (indoor and outdoor), a rock-climbing wall and hockey fields.

The School offers the following sports:

- Athletics
- Basketball
- Chess
- Cricket
- Cross country
- Field hockey
- Netball
- Squash
- Soccer
- Swimming
- Tennis

The Glen High School is part of the Pretoria English Medium High Schools Athletics Association (PEMHSAA).

== Council of Pupils ==
The school has a student body called The Council of Pupils (COP). An annual election is held in August for the following year's council members. The students are led by the president and a deputy president. There are a dozen student-led committees

== Notable alumni ==
Past students of The Glen High School are called Glenwegians and include:

- Marcos Ondruska – tennis player
- Sharon Cormack – member of South Africa's 1998 Women's Hockey World Cup squad
- Anton Greyling – under-23 footballer
- Ryan Hammond – dancer and contestant in Strictly Come Dancing
- Dennis Jensen – Australian politician
- Keryn Jordan – football
- Embeth Davidtz – actress
- Michael Mol – Mr. South Africa 1996 – TV Personality
- Bernelee Daniell – Miss South Africa 1995
- Wayne Barker – artist
- Natasha Mazzone – Democratic Alliance Member of Parliament
- Zoocci Coke Dope – record producer, rapper, singer, and audio engineer
