= Tanna Hollis =

South African footballer (born 2005)

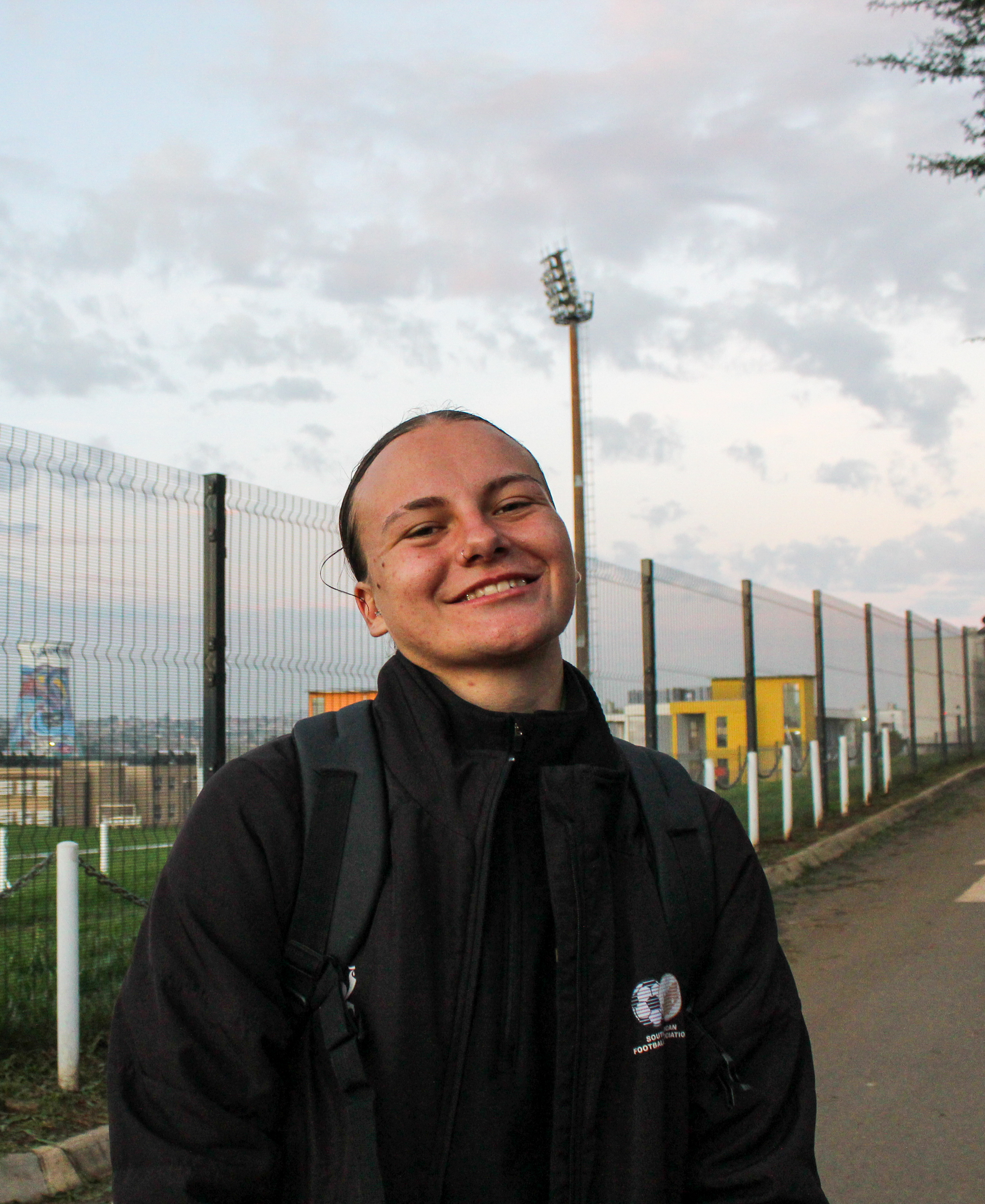
- Hollis in 2025

Personal information
- Full name: Tanna Patricia Hollis
- Date of birth: 27 November 2005 (age 20)
- Place of birth: Edenvale, South Africa
- Position: Forward

Team information
- Current team: Spartans W.F.C.

Youth career
- –2019: JVW Academy

Senior career*
Years	Team	Apps	(Gls)
2022–2025	JVW	9	(7)
2026	Partick Thistle W.F.C.	13	(0)
2026–	Spartans W.F.C.		

International career
2024–	South Africa		
- * Club domestic league appearances and goals

Tanna Patricia Hollis (born 27 November 2005) is a South African soccer player who plays as a forward for Scottish Women's Premier League club Spartans W.F.C and the South Africa women's national team.

== Personal life ==
Hollis attended Edenvale High School in Edenvale, Gauteng.

== Club career ==
=== JVW ===
Hollis came through the JVW Academy. In 2021, the JVW Sapphires were runners-up in the Johannesburg leg of the Engen Cup losing 4-3 via penalties to Kempton Park Ladies. She was awarded Striker of the Tournament.

She was promoted to the senior team at the start of the 2022 season. She scored her first senior team goal in a 10–2 victory over Richmond United on 23 April 2022.

On 24 March 2024, she scored a 75th minutes goal to help her side to a 5–1 win over the University of Fort Hare. On 20 April 2024, she scored her first Hollywoodbets Super League hattrick in a 5–0 away game win over Thunderbirds Ladies.

=== Scottish Women's Premier League ===
On 16th January 2026, Partick Thistle W.F.C.announced the signing of Hollis on their Facebook page. On 16 July 2026 she signed with Spartans W.F.C.

== International career ==
Hollis made her senior women's national team debut against Namibia in a 1–0 win at the 2024 COSAFA Women's Championship on 22 October 2024.

== Honours ==
JVW

- SAFA Women's League runners-up: 2025
- Gauteng Engen Cup runners-up:2021

Individual

- Gauteng Engen Cup: 2021 Striker of the Tournament
