= Edendale, KwaZulu-Natal =

Edendale
- Location within KwaZulu-Natal Location within South Africa
- Coordinates: 29.671°S 30.262°E
- Country: South Africa
- Province: KwaZulu-Natal
- District: UMgungundlovu
- Municipality: Msunduzi
- Established: 1851

Area
  - Total: 47.97 km^{2} (18.52 sq mi)

Population (2011)
  - Total: 140,891
  - Density: 2,937/km^{2} (7,607/sq mi)

Racial makeup (2011)
  - Black African: 99.5%
  - Coloured: 0.3%
  - Indian/Asian: 0.1%
  - White: 0.1%
  - Other: 0.1%

First languages (2011)
  - Zulu: 91.0%
  - Sotho: 4.6%
  - English: 1.7%
  - Xhosa: 1.5%
  - Other: 3.2%
- Time zone: UTC+2 (SAST)
- Postal code (street): 3201
- PO box: 3217

Edendale is a township in Msunduzi Local Municipality in the KwaZulu-Natal province of South Africa.

== History ==
Edendale was established in 1851, when 100 black Christian families settled on the farm Welverdiend, about 10 km south-west from Pietermaritzburg, and renamed it to its present name. The village was laid out under the guidance of James Allison, who had broken with the Wesleyan Missionary Society in 1851.

Unlike most black urban areas, Edendale was developed under private land ownership from the beginning, a concept that was new to Africans in Natal. This Christian community abandoned traditional beliefs and practices, moving away from polygamy and introducing men to cultivation, previously the realm of women.

Edendale retained its primarily Christian character into the 1920s, but by the 1940s people from rural areas began to pour in, leading to overcrowding and unsanitary conditions.

Edendale has become one of the most developing townships in Pietermaritzburg with amenities such as the Greater Edendale Mall, colleges, a police station, Edendale Hospital and private schools just to name a few.

== See also ==
- Edendale Technical High School

== Bibliography ==
- Marc Epprecht (2016). Welcome to Greater Edendale: Histories of Environment, Health, and Gender in an African City. McGill-Queen's University Press. ISBN 978-0-7735-9966-6.
