= Lyttelton Manor High School =

Coordinates: 25°50′5″S 28°12′5.2″E

Location
- 130 Selborne Avenue, Lyttelton Manor; Centurion, Gauteng; South Africa

Information
- Type: Public School
- Motto: Latin: Per Doctrinam Dignitas
- Religious affiliation: Christian
- Established: 1962; 64 years ago
- School district: District 9
- School number: 012 664 5698
- Principal: Mr c Masepoga
- Staff: 100 full-time
- Grades: 8–12
- Gender: Boys & Girls
- Age: 14 to 18
- Enrollment: 1,400 pupils
- Language: English
- Schedule: 07:30 - 14:30
- Campus: Urban Campus
- Campus type: Suburban
- Colours: Blue; Gold; White
- Rival: Clapham High School; The Glen High School
- Accreditation: Gauteng Department of Education
- Website: https://lytteltonmanorhs.co.za

Lyttelton Manor High School is a public English medium co-educational high school situated in the suburb of Lyttelton Manor in the town of Centurion in the Gauteng province of South Africa. The high school was established in 1962.

== History ==
The school was formed in 1962.

== Culture ==
The Scottish heritage of the school is displayed through the uniform, with the girls' skirts inspired by the Anderson tartan, while the ties worn by the boys reflect members of the Scottish pipe band.

== Sport ==
The school offers many sports. The school competes in the small schools league for the majority of their sports; with the exception of soccer.

The sports offered include Athletics, Basketball, Cricket, Cross-country, Hockey, Rugby, Soccer, fight club and netball.

Lyttelton Manor High also participates in the annual athletics event PEMHSAA, which is the Pretoria English Medium High School Athletics Association.

== Controversies ==
In recent years, numerous controversies have belittled the school's reputation. In 2006 there was a stabbing at the school, and in 2012 a student was caught with a gun. In 2017 a student robbed a passer-by in the streets, and in 2019 a male student assaulted a female student.

== Notable alumni ==
- Desmond Barker, major general in South African Air Force
- Phumzile van Damme, member of the National Assembly and Shadow Communications Minister
- Kurt Darren, singer, songwriter, and television presenter
- Dale Stewart, bass guitarist for the rock band Seether
