= Michael Mol =

South African medical doctor (born 1971)

Michael Benjamin Mol

Personal details
- Born: 16 August 1971 (age 55) Cape Town, South Africa
- Education: The Glen High School; University of Pretoria

Michael Benjamin Mol (born 16 August 1971) in Cape Town, South Africa is a medical doctor, an executive television producer, presenter, international speaker and business consultant.

Mol graduated from the University of Pretoria with a MBChB in 1995. He started his career as a medical doctor with interests in Emergency medicine and HIV management.

In 1999, whilst continuing in the medical fraternity, he began anchoring the television show Top Billing in South Africa.

Michael Mol has claimed media awards including Best on Camera Presentation at the NTVA Awards in 2000, 2001 and 2003 and Best Male Television Presenter at the People Magazine Crystal Awards in 2008. Michael is a former Mr. South Africa (1996), he is also a Red Cross Children's Champion and a patron of SA Cares for Life.

Mol was awarded a Hall of Fame Lifetime Achievement Award from the National Speakers Association of South Africa in April 2011. In October 2006, Mol was appointed as CEO of the Sportron International group of companies.

In October 2010 he signed up as the anchor of SABC3’s morning show, Expresso. In April 2011 Michael made a transition to becoming the Executive Producer and presenter of SABC3's television show Hello Doctor.

Mol resides in Cape Town, South Africa. He has been married to his wife, Jacqui Mol, since 1994 and has three children, Joshua, Rachael and Naethan.
