= Wayne Barker =

South African visual artist

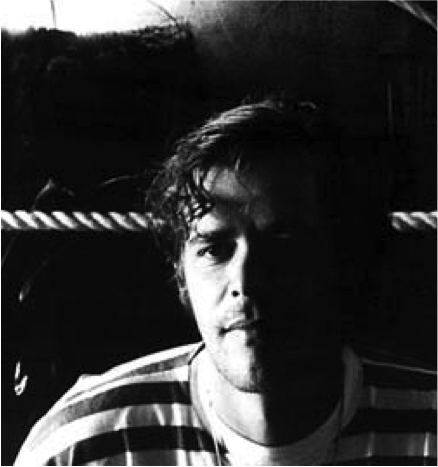
- Wayne Barker
- Born: 27 July 1963 (age 63); Pretoria, South Africa
- Education: Glen High School; Technikon Pretoria; University of Cape Town; École des Beaux-Arts
- Occupation: Visual artist
- Style: Painting, printmaking, sculpture, video, performance and installation
- Website: waynebarker.net

Wayne Barker (27 July 1963, Pretoria), South African visual artist. Barker is based in Johannesburg. He rose to prominence in the late 1980s, at the height of political unrest under the Apartheid regime. His work has featured in several global biennales, art fairs and important retrospective exhibitions. He works in various mediums, including but not limited to painting, printmaking, sculpture, video, performance and installation. In addition to collaborations with other artists, Barker has collaborated with the Qubeka Beadwork Studio based in Cape Town, to realise large-scale glass beadworks.

== Early life ==
Barker was born in Pretoria on 27 July 1963 to a white, working-class family at the height of Apartheid. Barker's father was a South African Airforce pilot, later turned commercial pilot and as a result, Barker and his siblings grew up on the Valhalla military base in Pretoria. Valhalla is the oldest Airforce base in the country, functional since 1921. Growing up in the highly conservative atmosphere of Pretoria in the 70s could in some ways be seen as a catalyst and contributing factor to Barker's particularly rebellious and aggressive attack on that exact conservatism. In Artist's Monologue, Barker recounts his childhood:

"We were absolutely part of a system where you were taught to hate black people," says Barker today. "It was entrenched in virtually every conversation at home." Yet he also recalls family gatherings as "quite real and warm, like there was a sort of gemutlich vibe. You had drunk uncles playing match boxes and singing Sarie Marais and all that stuff."

— Wayne Barker – Artist's Monograph, 2000, Chalkham Press

Barker and his brother attended Glen High School in Pretoria, before his expulsion in 1976 after being arrested for buying marijuana. In his teens, Barker left home to learn woodcarving on the coast at Nature's Valley in the Western Cape.

In 1983, after having failed art history at Michaelis, Barker returned home to his father's insistence that he join the South African military as three generations of Barker men before him had. To Barker, the SANDF represented everything about a South Africa in which he had no desire or aptitude to participate in. At the time, the tense political climate had seen a previously unknown escalation, and was straining under intense pressure both internationally and from within. The increased resistance to the apartheid regime had resulted in more and more military raids on private residences, and human rights violations. However, despite his unwillingness, Barker's conscription papers eventually arrived and he would find himself back in Pretoria at the Voortrekkerhoogte military base. Those who refused the service were jailed, so if he was to leave he had to be discharged. Over the course of two weeks he choreographed and played a part that eventually led to his being declared unfit for service due to mental instability. Upon his arrival home, Barker was disowned by his parents, and having to make his own way moved to Johannesburg to be an artist wholeheartedly.

== Education ==
On his arrival home and the completion of his high school studies, Barker pursued his arts education at the Pretoria Technikon, starting a diploma in Fine Art in 1981, before going on to study towards a BA in fine art from the Michaelis School of Fine Art at the University of Cape Town.

At Michaelis, Barker would begin to question the art making paradigm at school level. Politically, South Africa was undergoing its most turbulent moment thus far, to which Cape Town, according to Barker seemed indifferent. For a sculpture project under the supervision of Michaelis' Neville Dubow, in which students were required to sculpt an "extension of their bodies", Barker absconded from the trend that saw his classmates creating physical extensions and instead opted for the performative. Barker chose, instead, to dress up as his lecturer and have his classmates throw tennis balls at him, creating an extension of the man as a tennis court, which Dubow understandably found displeasing. After two years in Cape Town, he would return to Gauteng without his degree and be conscripted into the South African National Defence Force. After his short tenure at the SANDF, and having practiced for a period of time, Barker went on to pursue an honorary postgraduate degree in Fine art at the prestigious École des Beaux-Arts in Marseilles, France, in 1998, all the while creating and adding to a body of work that has maintained its social and political relevance in his home country and abroad.

== Career and work ==
Barker's name has become synonymous with a rebelliousness and recklessness, mention of which can be found in the accounts of several of his contemporaries, friends and those who would become his audience. Often cited as having a "sex, drugs and rock n roll" approach to fine art, his persona had become a very prominent add-on to his artistic identity. He has been referred to consistently as the enfant terrible of the South African art sphere, possessing simultaneously a profound sensitivity to life and art, bordering on the poetic as well as a deep rooted commitment to the truth or pursuit thereof. It comes as no surprise that over the span of his career, he has offended, scandalized and landed in hot water more than once. The first major controversy and also the event that catapulted Barker into the public eye centred on the 1990 Standard Bank National Drawing Competition in which he had entered a highly unresolved and hurried work under the African name of Andrew Moletsi. As a result, the Moletsi work was shortlisted, where Barker's was not, highlighting the biased, racially motivated judging systems that controlled the selection process.

=== The Famous International Gallery ===
Barker, Gunter Herbst, Pieter Roux, Morris La Mantia, Iaan Waldeck and Robert Weynik ran the Famous International Gallery (FIG), which was a turning point in the exhibition of South African contemporary art throughout its existence from 1989 to 1997. An artist-run space, the gallery was a space for younger artists at the time to exhibit their work. The gallery allowed artists to showcase work that most if not all commercial galleries at the time would not touch, creating a platform for political and social subversion in the South African art scene that would prove instrumental. Many of these artists eventually rose to prominence, including Kendell Geers, [Iaan Waldeck], William Kentridge, [Gunther Herbst], [Lisa Brice], Minette Vari, Barend De Wet, and Stephen Cohen.

=== "Coke Adds Life" ===
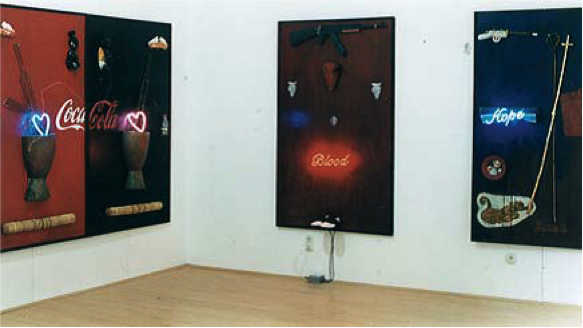
Installation view of Coke Adds Life at the Everard Read Gallery in Johannesburg, South Africa in 1993

In 1993, a year after the end of the Mozambican Civil War, Barker created a large-scale installation piece at the Everard Read Gallery in Johannesburg entitled "Coke Adds Life". Taking its title from a series of television commercials advertising Coca-Cola, the words became something darker than implied by the familiar, cheerful jingle. The installation was inspired by a trip to Mozambique, in which Barker visited a hospital that seemed deserted. Instead of inundated doctors, Barker found, instead, several Coca-Cola vending machines.

"Walking around Mozambique and going around hospitals and seeing no doctors and seeing coke machines in this war torn country was for me a massive installation of Apartheid so the first installation I made was called Coke Adds Life. If you can get a coke machine in a hospital, can't you get a doctor?" Wayne Barker, 2002

=== Nothing Gets Lost in the Universe ===
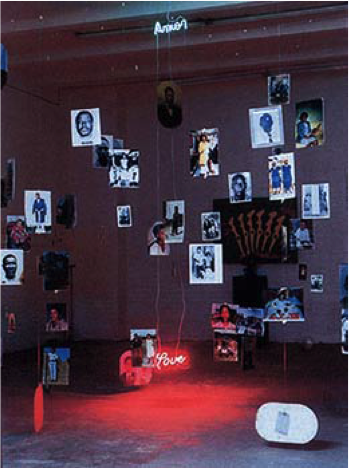
Zelbst, part of the overall exhibition, Nothing Gets Lost in the Universe at the Gallery Frank Hanel in Frankfurt in 1995

Nothing Gets Lost in the Universe was Barker's third solo show, shown at the F.I.G Gallery in 1995, and later the Gallery Frank Hanel in Frankfurt, Germany. Informed in part by the rise of the Truth and reconciliation commission that was slowly unearthing the dark truths hidden in Apartheid's murky past, the exhibition consisted of latex gloves filled with objects found on the streets of Frankfurt as well as a larger installation of photographs. Barker had long since established his reputation as a flaneur, that is, one who walks the streets of the city collecting objects and experiences. In an adjoining room, a work called "Zelbst", more than 300 portrait photographs of black people in 1970s South Africa, was suspended from the ceiling. The exhibition spoke to the notion of the object on one level, with regards to the latex gloves and their contents – nothing gets lost in the universe, only found under a different set of circumstances, with a particular history and patina attached to it. On another level, the haunting portraits that made up Zelbst spoke to a different sort of sensitivity not wholly unconnected to that shown by the latex glove objects. These were critical of representation, a moment frozen in time, transformed through photography into objects, not dissimilar to the toy guns, pipes and coffee filters found on the streets of Frankfurt. In this way, Barker became the ultimate flaneur, a collector of lived experience, pursuing the idea that history does not forget, and that nothing gets lost in the universe.

=== Land and desire – the Pierneef paintings 1990–2015 ===
In the early 1990s, Barker started an investigation that would span more than two decades. Taking the work of the Afrikaner nationalist landscape artist J. H. Pierneef (1886–1957), Barker began to disseminate what remains to this day a highly contested issue in South Africa – land, colonialism and ownership. "As I understand it, Pierneef was a propagandist for the white view of South Africa" – Wayne Barker, 1990

Pierneef's idealised South African landscapes have since been located by art critics and historians as being rooted in a strong Afrikaans nationalist outlook. Where his painting style was revolutionary to the time, his concerns were more aligned to the ideologies of the current, ruling political philosophy. The "propaganda" Barker speaks of lay in Pierneef's deliberate omission of the existence of any sort of black presence, and his subtle conviction that the magnificent landscapes depicted were the God-given right of the Afrikaner. Barker would painstakingly recreate Pierneef's landscapes, before introducing other elements to them. These were neon dots (which would eventually become something of a calling card), splatters of lacquer paint in neon colour, overlaying images he would pick (nudes, "church ladies", popular logos) in order to elaborate on issues surrounding land, contestation and desire in his own time, post-Pierneef and post-apartheid. The Pierneef series has seen iterations in various media, finding itself translated into print media as well as in his collaborations with the Qubeka Bead Studio in Cape Town.

Barker remains a prolific and active figure in the South African contemporary art sphere, exhibiting regularly with high-profile galleries as well as newer, up-and-coming ones. In addition to Super Boring (2010), a large-scale retrospective of his work at the Standard Bank Galleries in Johannesburg and Polokwane as well as the SMAC Gallery in Cape Town, Barker has had two recent large-scale exhibitions of new work at the CIRCA Gallery in Johannesburg. Normal Man (2015) was largely well received by the public and critically. His 2016 exhibition, The World that Changed the Image, shown at the Everard Read Contemporary Gallery in Johannesburg, consisted mainly of new works in the medium of screen-printing that Barker had resolved to learn on a recent trip to New York on which he had met a master screen printer. Upon his return to Johannesburg, Barker purchased all the equipment to establish a functioning screen-printing studio and learned the medium. All the print works featured in the show were printed in Barker's own studio largely on his own, with the help of an assistant.

== Personal life ==
Barker lives and works out of his studio in Troyeville, Johannesburg, with his wife. He has lived in the area for several years, earning the affectionate title "the Mayor of Troyeville". He has two daughters.

== Selected exhibitions, collections and bibliography ==
=== Solo ===
- 1987 - Images on Metal, Market Theatre, Johannesburg
- 1992 - Three Bodies of Love, Everard Read Contemporary Gallery, Johannesburg
- 1993 - Coke Adds Life, Everard Read Contemporary Gallery, Johannesburg
- 1994 - Peace Through Blood, Fig Gallery, Johannesburg
- 1995 - Nothing Gets Lost in the Universe, Gallery Frank Hanel, Frankfurt, Germany
- 1996 - Nothing Gets Lost in the Universe, Fig Gallery, Johannesburg
  - All Washed Up in Africa, Gallery Frank Hanel, Frankfurt, Germany
  - All Washed Up in Africa, Gallery Frank Hanel, Cape Town
- 1997
  - All washed Up in Pretoria, dual solo show with Iaan Waldeck "Body composition" Millennium Gallery, Pretoria
  - Beauty in Politics, Millennium Gallery, Pretoria
  - Kunst is Kinderspielen, Kunsthalle, Krems, Austria
- 1998
- 1999 - Fin de Ciècle, Nantes, France
- 2001 - Two Cousins, Fig Gallery, London
- 2002 - ITS ALL GOOD, Crosspath Culture, New York.
- 2003 - Lovers and Gurus, Contemporary Art Space, Caen, France
- 2005 - Land and Desire, Gerard Sekoto Gallery, Alliance Francaise, Johannesburg
- 2008 - Heal, UCA gallery, Cape Town
  - Super Boring, Standard Bank Gallery, Johannesburg
  - Super Boring, Standard Bank, Polokwane
  - Super Boring, SMAC Art Gallery, Stellenbosch
- 2010
- 2012 - Love Land, CIRCA Gallery, Johannesburg
- 2015 - Normal Man, CIRCA Gallery, Johannesburg
- 2016 - The World that Changed the Image, Everard Read Contemporary Gallery, Johannesburg

=== Group exhibitions ===
- 1989 - Breaking Down the Wall: Pierneef Series, FIG Gallery, Johannesburg
- 1992 - Volkskas Atelier, Pietersburg Art Museum, Pietersburg
- 1993 - Something New Always Comes Out of Africa, Newtown Gallery, Johannesburg
  - Brown and Green, Pretoria Art Museum, Pretoria
  - Can Art Exist Alone: Art and Politics, Pretoria Art Museum, Pretoria
  - Scurvy, New Town Gallery, Johannesburg
- 1995
  - The Laager, First Johannesburg Biennale, Johannesburg
  - Africus, Black Looks White Myths, First Johannesburg Biennale, South Africa curator: Octavio Zaya Africus
- 1995
  - Groundswell: Contemporary Art from South Africa, Mermaid Gallery, London
  - Colours, Haus der Kulturen der Welt, Berlin, Germany – opened by President Nelson Mandela
- 1996
  - Future, Present, Contemporary South African Art, Goodman Gallery, Johannesburg
  - Three x Ten, Frank Hanel Gallery, Cape Town
  - Frankfurt Art Fair, under the Auspices of Frank Hanel Gallery, Frankfurt, Germany
  - Köln Art Fair, under the Auspices of Frank Hanel Gallery, Frankfurt, Germany
  - The World is Flat, installation, Alternating Currents, Trade Routes: History and Geography, 2nd Johannesburg Biennale, Johannesburg, South Africa curated by Okwui, Enwezor, and Octavio Zaya
- 1997
  - memórias íntimas marcas, Electric Workshop, Johannesburg
  - Kleine Plastiche Triennale, Stuttgart, Germany
- 1998
- 2001 - No Logo, Prince Albert Museum, London, UK
- 2006 - Urban Jungle, Afronova, Johannesburg
- 2007 - Sasol wax art award Exhibition, Johannesburg Art Museum
- 2008 - Collection 10, SMAC Art Gallery, Stellenbosch
- 2009 - History, UCT Gallery, Cape Town, South Africa
- 2009 - Great South African Nude Exhibition, Everard Read, Johannesburg
- 2009 - I Linguaggi del Mondo: Languages of the World, collateral exhibition to the Venice Biennale, Palazzo Querini Art House, Venice, Italy
- 2013 - My Joburg, la maison rouge, Paris (F), 20 June – 22 September, Curators: Paula Aisemberg and Antoine de Galbert. On the occasion of the South Africa-France Cultural

=== Collections ===
- Anglo American Collection
- Durban Art Museum
- Gencor Collection
- Iziko South African National Gallery
- Johannesburg Art Gallery
- MTN Collection
- Polokwane Art Museum
- Pretoria Art Museum
- Rand Merchant Bank
- Sanlam collection
- Sasol Collection
- SABC collection
- Sandton Civic Gallery
- Spier
- Standard Bank Gallery
- Wits Art Museum (formerly Gertrude Posel Gallery), University of Witwatersrand

=== Catalogs, and articles ===
- "Africus: First Johannesburg Biennale", 1995, Candice Breitz (ed.), Catalogue
- "Colours", 1996, Haus der Kulturen der Welt, Catalogue
- "Art in South Africa: the future present", 1996, Sue Williamson and Ashraf Jamal (eds)
- "Contemporary South African Art: The Gencor Collection", 1997, Kendal Geers (ed.)
- "Trade Routes: History and Geography", 1997, Matthew DeBord (ed.) Catalogue, 2nd Johannesburg Biennale
- "Wayne Barker: Artist's Monograph", 2000, Brenda Atkinson (ed.)
- 'The ID of South African Artists' (catalogue), 2004, Sharlene Khan (ed.). Fortis Circus Theatre, Holland
- 'Super Boring', 2010, SMAC & Standard Bank Gallery
