= 2019 CECAFA U-15 Championship =

Tournament details
- Host country: Eritrea
- City: Asmara
- Dates: 16–30 August 2019
- Teams: 10 (from CAF confederations)
- Venue: 1 (in 1 host city)

Final positions
- Champions: Uganda
- Runners-up: Kenya
- Third place: Rwanda
- Fourth place: Burundi

Tournament statistics
- Matches played: 24
- Goals scored: 81 (3.38 per match)
- Top scorer: (Uganda) Kyeyune Abasi
- Best player: (Eritrea) Temesghen Tesfai
- Best goalkeeper: (Kenya) Lwangu Alvin

The 2019 CECAFA U15 Championship was the first CECAFA U-15 Championship organized by CECAFA (Council of East and Central Africa Football Association). It was held in Eritrea (it is the first time in recent times that an official international football tournament is being staged in Eritrea.)

== Venues ==
- Cicero Stadium, Asmara

== Teams ==
- Burundi
- Eritrea
- Sudan
- Kenya
- Somalia
- South Sudan
- Tanzania
- Uganda
- Ethiopia
- Rwanda
- Djibouti (Note: Djibouti withdrew from the competition)

== Officials ==
Referees

- William Oloya (Uganda)
- Sabri Mohammed Fadul (Sudan)
- Lemma Nigussi (Ethiopia)
- Biruk Yemanebirhan Kassaun (Ethiopia)
- Idris Osman Mohammed (Eritrea)
- Yodit Hagos (Eritrea)

Assistant Referees

- (South Sudan) Olibo George Primato (South Sudan)
- Nagi Subahi Ahmed (Sudan)
- Ahmed Abdulahi Farah (Somalia)
- Soud Iddi Lila (Tanzania)
- Emery Niyongabo (Burundi)
- Joshua Achila (Kenya)
- Samuel Kuria (Kenya)
- Eyobel Michael (Eritrea)
- Aron Ghebrekrstos (Eritrea)
- Elsa Johannes (Eritrea)

== Group stage ==
=== Group A ===
Pos	Team	Pld	W	D	L	GF	GA	GD	Pts	Qualification
1	Kenya	4	3	1	0	10	3	+7	10	Advance to knockout stage
2	Burundi	4	3	1	0	9	3	+6	10	Advance to knockout stage
3	Eritrea	4	1	1	2	8	4	+4	4	
4	Somalia	4	1	1	2	4	5	−1	4	
5	Sudan	4	0	0	4	0	16	−16	0	

Source: CECAFA
Rules for classification: Group stage tiebreakers
16 August 2019
14:00

Somalia	1–3	Kenya
	Report

Cicero Stadium, Asmara
Referee: Lemma Nigussi (Ethiopia)
16 August 2019
16:30

Eritrea	1–2	Burundi
	Report

Cicero Stadium, Asmara
Referee: William Oloya (Uganda)

18 August 2019
14:00

Sudan	0–4	Kenya
	Report

Cicero Stadium, Asmara
Referee: Idris Osman Mohammed (Eritrea)
18 August 2019
16:30

Somalia	1–2	Burundi
	Report

Cicero Stadium, Asmara
Referee: Lemma Nigussi (Ethiopia)

20 August 2019
14:00

Kenya	1–1	Burundi
	Report

Cicero Stadium, Asmara
Referee: Biruk Yemanebirhan Kassaun (Ethiopia)
20 August 2019
16:30

Eritrea	6–0	Sudan
	Report

Cicero Stadium, Asmara
Referee: Lemma Nigussi (Ethiopia)

22 August 2019
14:00

Sudan	0–2	Somalia
	Report

Cicero Stadium, Asmara
Referee: Biruk Yemanebirhan Kassaun (Ethiopia)
22 August 2019
16:30

Eritrea	1–2	Kenya
	Report

Cicero Stadium, Asmara
Referee: William Oloya (Uganda)

24 August 2019
14:00

Sudan	0–4	Burundi
	Report

Cicero Stadium, Asmara
Referee: Lemma Nigussi (Ethiopia)
24 August 2019
16:30

Eritrea	1–1	Somalia
	Report

Cicero Stadium, Asmara
Referee: Biruk Yemanebirhan Kassaun (Ethiopia)

=== Group B ===
Pos	Team	Pld	W	D	L	GF	GA	GD	Pts	Qualification
1	Uganda	4	4	0	0	13	0	+13	12	Advance to knockout stage
2	Rwanda	4	3	0	1	8	4	+4	9	Advance to knockout stage
3	Tanzania	4	2	0	2	10	5	+5	6	
4	Ethiopia	4	0	1	3	2	10	−8	1	
5	South Sudan	3	0	1	2	1	15	−14	1	

Source: CECAFA
Rules for classification: Group stage tiebreakers
17 August 2019
14:00

Uganda	3–0	Ethiopia
	Report

Cicero Stadium, Asmara
Referee: Sabri Mohammed Fadul (Sudan)
17 August 2019
16:30

Rwanda	3–0	South Sudan
	Report

Cicero Stadium, Asmara
Referee: Idris Osman Mohammed (Eritrea)

19 August 2019
14:00

Uganda	2–0	Tanzania
	Report

Cicero Stadium, Asmara
Referee: Sabri Mohammed Fadul (Sudan)
19 August 2019
16:30

Ethiopia	1–1	South Sudan
	Report

Cicero Stadium, Asmara
Referee: William Oloya (Uganda)

21 August 2019
14:00

Tanzania	6–0	South Sudan
	Report

Cicero Stadium, Asmara
Referee: Idris Osman Mohammed (Eritrea)
21 August 2019
16:30

Rwanda	3–0	Ethiopia
	Report

Cicero Stadium, Asmara
Referee: William Oloya (Uganda)

23 August 2019
14:00

Rwanda	2–1	Tanzania
	Report

Cicero Stadium, Asmara
Referee: Lemma Nigussi (Ethiopia)
23 August 2019
16:30

Uganda	5–0 Abandoned (55') (Note: South Sudan who came into this game with 5 players out through injury had to abandon the match early into the second half as 5 more players couldn't finish the game because of injuries)	South Sudan
	Report

Cicero Stadium, Asmara
Referee: Biruk Yemanebirhan Kassaun (Ethiopia)

25 August 2019
14:00

Tanzania	3–1	Ethiopia
	Report

Cicero Stadium, Asmara
Referee: William Oloya (Uganda)
25 August 2019
16:30

Rwanda	0–3	Uganda
	Report

Cicero Stadium, Asmara
Referee: Sabri Mohammed Fadul (Sudan)

== Knockout stage ==
=== Semi-finals ===
28 August 2019
16:30

Kenya	1–1	Rwanda
	Report
Penalties
	4–2

Cicero Stadium, Asmara, Asmara
Referee: Sabri Mohammed Fadul (Sudan)
28 August 2019
14:00

Uganda	6–0	Burundi
	Report

Cicero Stadium, Asmara, Asmara
Referee: Lemma Nigussi (Ethiopia)

=== 3rd Place Match ===
30 August 2019
13:00

Rwanda	1–1	Burundi
Penalties
	4–2

Cicero Stadium, Asmara, Asmara
Referee: William Oloya (Uganda)

=== Final ===
30 August 2019

Uganda	4–0	Kenya
	Report

Cicero Stadium, Asmara, Asmara
Referee: Idris Osman Mohammed (Eritrea)

== Winner ==
2019 CECAFA U15 Championship Winners
(Uganda)
Uganda
1st title
