= Kumalo =

Kumalo is a South African surname, sometimes an alternative spelling of Khumalo.

Notable people with the surname include:

- Alf Kumalo (1930–2002), a South African photojournalist
- Dumisani Kumalo (1947–2019), a South African diplomat
- Basetsana Kumalo (born 1974), a South African television personality, beauty pageant titleholder, and businesswoman
- Duma Kumalo (died 2006), a South African human rights activist
- Bakithi Kumalo (born 1956), a South African musician

== See also ==
- Didier Kumalo, an Australian musical group
