= South Africa national under-15 soccer team =

Youth football team

South Africa under-15
- Association: South African; Football Association
- Confederation: CAF (Africa)
- Sub-confederation: COSAFA
- Head coach: (South Africa) Selekedi Thulani Mogale
- Captain: Bokamoso Mokokosi
- Home stadium: FNB Stadium
- FIFA code: RSA
| First colours | Second colours |

First international
- South Africa 3–0 Seychelles (Lilongwe, Malawi; 29 October 2022)

Biggest win
- South Africa 13–1 Anguilla (Baku, Azerbaijan; 25 October 2026)

Biggest defeat
- South Africa 2–4 Ivory Coast (Rabat, Morocco; 12 December 2023)

CAF African Schools Football Championship
- Appearances: 2 (first in 2023)
- Best result: (silver) Runners-Up (2023)

COSAFA Schools Cup
- Appearances: 2 (first in 2022)
- Best result: (gold) Champions (2022, 2023, 2024)

FIFA U-15 World Cup & Festival
- Appearances: 1 (first in 2026)
- Best result: 44th
- Website: https://www.safa.net/

The South Africa national under-15 football team, is a youth football (soccer) team, which represents South Africa and is controlled by the South African Football Association, the governing body for football in South Africa. The team's main objectives is to develop players for the Amajimbos team.

== History ==
The first pool of players for the team was identified during the SAFA/FIFA Talent Development Scheme (TDS) Tournament and the National Schools Championship in 2022.

=== FIFA U-15 World Cup & Festival ===
They team participated in the first FIFA U-15 World Cup & Festival in Azerbaijan. They recorded their highest winning margin in a 13–1 win against Anguilla at the tournment. The team ended their maiden FIFA campaign in 44th position.

=== FIFA Talent Development Scheme ===
They ended 2023 with a TDS invitation. Their first match was against Ivory Coast, which they lost 4–2. Their second match was held on the 17th of December 2023 against Morocco, which they won 3–1.

=== COSAFA Schools Cup ===
At the inaugural COSAFA Schools Cup, they won their opening match 3–0 against Ile Perseverance from Seychelles and drew their second match 1–1 against Salima Secondary from Malawi. They won their semi-final 6–0 against Rosinha from Angola. They won the final 1–0 against Salima Secondary from Malawi.

At the 2023 OSAFA Schools Cup, they topped group B with ten points winning 7–0 against Angola, a walkover against Zambia after the Zambians did not pitch for their match, 2–1 against Namibia, and drawing the final group stage match 0–0 with Madagascar to head into the final. They won the final 3–0 via penalties against Malawi after the match ended in a goalless draw.

At the 2024 COSAFA Schools Cup, they topped group B with nine points winning 1–0 against Zimbabwe, 3–0 against Angola, and 4–0 against Eswatini and qualified for the semifinals against group A runners-up Malawi. They won their semi-final 2–1. They went on to win their third consecutive schools cup 4–2 via penalties against Zambia after the match ended in a 1–1 draw.

=== CAF African Schools Football Championship ===
The team took part in the inaugural CAF African Schools Football Championship in 2023 and were runners-up to CS Ben Sekou Sylla from Guinea losing 5–4 via penalties after the match ended in a 1–1 draw.

In the 2024 CAF African Schools Football Championship where they did not make it past the group stage with 1 win and 2 loses.

== Results and fixtures ==
The following is a list of match results in the last 12 months, as well as any future matches that have been scheduled.

Legend

Win Draw Loss Fixture

=== 2026 ===
| 24 October FIFA U-15 | Maldives | 0–8 | South Africa | Baku, Azerbaijan |
| | | | | Stadium: Hövsan Competition Complex |

| 25 October FIFA U-15 | Kosovo | 2–1 | South Africa | Baku, Azerbaijan |
| | | | | Stadium: Hövsan Competition Complex |

| 25 October FIFA U-15 | South Africa | 13–1 | Anguilla | Baku, Azerbaijan |
| | | | | Stadium: Hövsan Competition Complex |

| 26 October FIFA U-15 | Estonia | 0–0 | South Africa | Baku, Azerbaijan |
| | | | | Stadium: Hövsan Competition Complex |

| 26 October FIFA U-15 | France | 2–3 | South Africa | Baku, Azerbaijan |
| | | | | Stadium: Hövsan Competition Complex |

| 28 October FIFA U-15 | Malaysia | 2–6 | South Africa | Baku, Azerbaijan |
| | | | | Stadium: Hövsan Competition Complex |

| 28 October FIFA U-15 | Portugal | 2–1 | South Africa | Baku, Azerbaijan |
| | | | | Stadium: Hövsan Competition Complex |

| 29 October FIFA U-15 | United Arab Emirates | 1–5 | South Africa | Baku, Azerbaijan |
| | | | | Stadium: Hövsan Competition Complex |

| 29 October FIFA U-15 | South Africa | 3–4 | Ivory Coast | Baku, Azerbaijan |
| | | | | Stadium: Hövsan Competition Complex |

| 30 October FIFA U-15 | Niger | 3–2 | South Africa | Baku, Azerbaijan |
| | | | | Stadium: Hövsan Competition Complex |

== Current players ==
The following players were called up for the 2026 FIFA U-15 World Cup & Festival:

| No. | Pos. | Player | Date of birth (age) | Club |
|---|---|---|---|---|
| 1 | GK | Mpho Raburabu | | (South African Football Association) Mamelodi Sundowns |
| 3 | GK | Ian De Jongh | | (South African Football Association) Kaizer Chiefs |
| 4 | DF | Osaretin Asubaja | | (South African Football Association) Mamelodi Sundowns |
| 5 | DF | Alex Van Der Werf | | (South African Football Association) Cape Town City |
| 6 | DF | Katlego Mokhabuki | | (South African Football Association) Mamelodi Sundowns |
| 7 | DF | Tumelo Moerane | | (South African Football Association) Kaizer Chiefs |
| 8 | MF | Bohlale Finger | | (South African Football Association) Mamelodi Sundowns |
| 9 | MF | Camden Schaper | | (The Football Association) Blackburn Rovers |
| 10 | MF | Tshiamo Mashishi | | (South African Football Association) Mamelodi Sundowns |
| 11 | MF | Neo Dlamini | | (South African Football Association) Kaizer Chiefs |
| 12 | FW | Lesedi Hlalele | | (South African Football Association) Kaizer Chiefs |
| 13 | FW | Keanu Moses | | (South African Football Association) Mamelodi Sundowns |
| 14 | FW | Inganathi Saliwa | | (South African Football Association) Kaizer Chiefs |
| 15 | FW | Reatlegile Mosimane | | (South African Football Association) Kaizer Chiefs |

== Honours ==
- CAF African Schools Football Championship runners-up: 2023
- COSAFA Schools Cup: 2022, 2023, 2024

== See also ==
- Bafana Bafana (South Africa national football team)
- Amaglug-glug (South Africa national under-23 football team)
- Amajita (South Africa national under-20 football team)
- Amajimbos ((South Africa national under-17 football team)
- Amabinneplaas (South Africa national development football team)
