= Roseville, Pretoria =

Roseville
- Location within Gauteng Location within South Africa
- Coordinates: 25°43′0″S 28°11′0″E
- Country: South Africa
- Province: Gauteng
- Municipality: City of Tshwane
- Main Place: Pretoria

Area
  - Total: 3.79 km^{2} (1.46 sq mi)

Population (2011)
  - Total: 1,722
  - Density: 454/km^{2} (1,180/sq mi)

Racial makeup (2011)
  - Black African: 9.8%
  - Coloured: 1.2%
  - Indian/Asian: 1.1%
  - White: 87.8%
  - Other: 0.1%

First languages (2011)
  - Afrikaans: 82.5%
  - English: 9.4%
  - Northern Sotho: 1.7%
  - Zulu: 1.3%
  - Other: 5.1%
- Time zone: UTC+2 (SAST)
- Postal code (street): 0084
- PO box: n/a
- Area code: 012

Roseville is a central-northern suburb of Pretoria, South Africa. The suburb straddles the Apies River. The suburb is light industrial to the west of the river and residential to the east of the river.

The suburb includes Hillview High School.
