= Vela Khumalo =

South African football manager (born 1977)

Personal information
- Full name: Vela Kleinbooi Khumalo
- Date of birth: 20 August 1977 (age 49)
- Place of birth: Kroonstad, South Africa

Team information
- Current team: Kaizer Chiefs DDC; South Africa U17 (head coach)

Managerial career
- Years: Team
- –: Kaizer Chiefs DDC
- 2024–: South Africa U17
- 2025: South Africa A

Vela Kleinbooi Khumalo (born 20 August 1977) is a South African teacher and soccer manager who is the current head coach of the Kaizer Chiefs DDC team and the South Africa national under-17 soccer team.

== Personal life ==
Khumalo is a teacher by profession and is the principal at Nooitgedacht Primary School and holds a CAF A coaching license.

== Managerial career ==
=== Kaizer Chiefs Academy ===
Khumalo led the Kaizer Chiefs Diski Challenge team to their maiden PSL Reserve title in the 2024/25 season.

=== South Africa A ===
In June 2025 he was appointed the coach of the South Africa A team for 2025 COSAFA Cup where they finished as runners-up to Angola.

=== South Africa under-17 ===
He coached the team at the 2025 COSAFA U-17 Cup when the team won their first title since 2020 and qualified for the 2026 U-17 AFCON. He then lead the South Africa under-17 to their first knockout round at the 2025 FIFA U-17 World Cup.

== Honours ==
South Africa

- COSAFA Cup: Runners-Up: 2025
- COSAFA U-17 Cup: 2025

Kaizer Chiefs Development

- PSL Reserve: 2024/25
