= South Africa women's national under-15 soccer team =

Youth football team

South Africa women's under-15
- Association: South African; Football Association
- Confederation: CAF (Africa)
- Sub-confederation: COSAFA
- Head coach: (South Africa) Ntombifuthi Khumalo
- Captain: Rethabile Molefe
- Top scorer: Leonay Kock (13 goals)
- Home stadium: FNB Stadium
- FIFA code: RSA
First colours	Second colours

First international
- Malawi 1–0 South Africa (Lilongwe, Malawi; 29 October 2022)

Biggest win
- Angola 0–14 South Africa (Harare, Zimbabwe; 14 December 2023)

Biggest defeat
- Tanzania 7–1South Africa (Durban, South Africa; 5 April 2023)

CAF African Schools Football Championship
- Appearances: 3 (first in 2023)
- Best result: (gold) Champions (2024)

COSAFA Schools Cup
- Appearances: 3 (first in 2022)
- Best result: (gold) Champions (2022, 2023, 2024)
Medal record
CAF African Schools Football Championship
First place	2024 Zanzibar
Third place	2025 Ghana
COSAFA Schools Cup
First place	2022 South Africa
First place	2023 Zimbabwe
First place	2024 Namibia
- Website: https://www.safa.net/

The South Africa national women's under-15 football team, is a youth football (soccer) team, which represents South Africa and is controlled by the South African Football Association, the governing body for football in South Africa. The team's main objectives is to develop players for the Bantwana team.

== History ==
=== COSAFA Schools Cup ===
At the inaugural COSAFA Schools Cup, they lost their opening match 1–0 to Malindi Secondary from Malawi but the points were awarded to the South Africans after the Malawian school fielded ineligible players. They won their second match 3–0 against Anse Boileau from Seychelles and topped the group with nine points after a 7–0 win against GS Ningha from Comoros to head to the final. They won the final 4–0 against Mothamo JSS from Botswana and qualified for the inaugural CAF African Schools Football Championship.

Edendale Technical High from KwaZulu-Natal won the Winter National Schools Sport Championship for the second time and secured themselves a chance to represent South Africa at the 2023 COSAFA Schools Cup.

At the 2023 COSAFA Schools Cup, they topped group B with twelve points winning 14–0 against Angola in their opening match. They had a walkover against Zambia after the Zambians did not pitch for their match, won 3–0 against Namibia and won their final match 8–0 against Madagascar to head into the final. They won the final 3–1 against Botswana to qualify for the 2024 CAF African Schools Football Championship.

At the 2024 COSAFA Schools Cup, they topped group B with nine points winning 7–0 against Zimbabwe, 13–0 against Angola, and 4–0 against Eswatini to qualify for the semifinals against group A runners-up Lesotho. They won their semi-final 10–0. They went on to win their third consecutive schools cup with a come-from-behind 3–1 win against Malawi.

=== CAF African Schools Football Championship ===
The team took part in the inaugural CAF African Schools Football Championship in 2023 but failed to qualify for the knockout rounds.

In the 2024 CAF African Schools Football Championship they were second in group B after 1 win and 2 draws and qualified for the semi-finals against group A winners and defending champions Tanzania. They won their semi-final 1–0 against Tanzania. They went on to face Morocco in the 2024 CAF African Schools Football Championship final and won 5–4 via penalties after the match ended in a 1–1 draw to lift their maiden championship.

In the 2025 CAF African Schools Football Championship they were runners-ups in group B with a loss and 2 wins including a 8–0 win against the DRC. They lost the semi-final 3–2 to Ghana and finished third after defeating Morocco 2–1 in the 3rd place playoff.

== Results and fixtures ==
The following is a list of match results in the last 12 months, as well as any future matches that have been scheduled.

Legend

Win Draw Loss Fixture

== Current players ==
The following players were called up for the 2025 CAF African Schools Football Championship:

No.	Pos.	Player	Date of birth (age)	Caps	Goals	Club
	GK	Dakalo Mafumo			{{{goals}}}	(South African Football Association) Tuks High School
	GK	Eaglet Ramandwa			{{{goals}}}	(South African Football Association) Sinthumule Secondary School
	DF	Lethuthando Mthembu			{{{goals}}}	(South African Football Association) Villiersdrop Secondary School
	DF	Rethabile Molefe			{{{goals}}}	(South African Football Association) Clapham High School
	DF	Dazel Mkhari			{{{goals}}}	(South African Football Association) Clapham High School
	MF	Ambani Raphadara			{{{goals}}}	(South African Football Association) Clapham High School
	MF	Okuhle Sthole			{{{goals}}}	(South African Football Association) Kwamakhutha High School
	MF	Nomfundo Nzuza			{{{goals}}}	(South African Football Association) Clapham High School
	DF	Mpumelelo Mazibuko			{{{goals}}}	(South African Football Association) Rabasotho High School
	MF	Somila Gani			{{{goals}}}	(South African Football Association) Clapham High School
	MF	Leonay Kock			{{{goals}}}	(South African Football Association) Clapham High School
	MF	Akhona Simamane			{{{goals}}}	(South African Football Association) Clapham High School
	DF	Nkosingiphile Mthomebi			{{{goals}}}	(South African Football Association) St Mark's International School
	DF	Havene Whitney			{{{goals}}}	(South African Football Association) St Mark's International School
	MF	Lisakhanya Situlwani			{{{goals}}}	(South African Football Association) Bothasig High School
	MF	Imaan Dollie			{{{goals}}}	(South African Football Association) Ubuntu Football School
	DF	Miah Messier			{{{goals}}}	(South African Football Association) Ubuntu Football School
	DF	Hajiera Sulayman			{{{goals}}}	(South African Football Association) Ubuntu Football School
	DF	Pulane Moloi			{{{goals}}}	(South African Football Association) Clapham High School
	DF	Farah Thomas			{{{goals}}}	(South African Football Association) South Peninsula High

=== Top goalscorers ===
Active players in bold, statistics correct as of April 2025.

Rank	Player	Goals
1	**Leonay Kock**	13
2	**Khwezi Khoza**	**12**
3	Nobahle Mdelwa	8
4	**Pulane Moloi**	6
5	**Gani Somila**	4

=== Coach ===
All-time U-15 girls coaching records
Coach	Tenure	Reference
Ntombifuthi Khumalo	2022 – present	

== Honours ==
- CAF African Schools Football Championship: 2024
- COSAFA Schools Cup: 2022, 2023, 2024

== All time performance ==
CAF African Schools Football Championship

Year	Best
2023	Group Stage
2024	Champions
2025	Third

COSAFA Schools Cup

Year	Best
2022	Champions
2023	Champions
2024	Champions

== See also ==
- Banyana Banyana (South Africa women's national football team)
- Basetsana (South Africa women's national under-20 football team)
- Bantwana (South Africa women's national under-17 football team)
