= Tanzania national under-15 football team =

Tanzania under-15
- Association: Tanzania Football Federation
- Confederation: CAF (Africa)
- Sub-confederation: CECAFA (East & Central Africa)
- Home stadium: Benjamin Mkapa Stadium
- FIFA code: TAN
| First colours | Second colours |
Medal record
CAF African Schools Football Championship
| First place | 2024 Zanzibar |
| First place | 2025 Ghana |
CECAFA Schools Cup
| First place | 2024 Uganda |
| Second place | 2023 Kenya |

The Tanzania national under-15 football team is a youth football team, which represents Tanzania and is controlled by the Tanzania Football Federation, the governing body for football in Tanzania.

They won the CAF African Schools Football Championship in 2024 and defended the title in 2025.

== History ==
=== CECAFA Schools Cup ===
They were runners-up in the 2023 CECAFA Schools Cup losing 4-2 via penalties to Uganda after the match ended in a 1 all draw. They won their maiden title in 2024.

=== CAF African Schools Football Championship ===
The team hosted the 2024 CAF African Schools Football Championship where they lifted their maiden title in Zanzibar. They defended their title in Ghana winning 3-2 via penalties against Senegal after the match ended in a goalless draw.

== Honours ==
- CAF African Schools Football Championship: 2024, 2025
- CECAFA Schools Cup: 2024, Runners-Up: 2023
