= Walter Khumalo =

South African soccer player

Personal information
- Full name: Usimanga Walter Khumalo
- Date of birth: 2 September 1972 (age 54)
- Place of birth: Sasolburg, South Africa
- Position: Goalkeeper

Senior career*
Years	Team	Apps	(Gls)
- Vaal Professionals
- Free State Stars
- Bloemfontein Celtic
- AmaZulu
2003–????	Black Leopards		
- Jomo Cosmos
2007–2010	Free State Stars		
2010–????	Mpumalanga Black Aces		
- * Club domestic league appearances and goals

Usimanga Walter Khumalo (born 2 September 1972) is a South African football coach and former player who played as a goalkeeper.

He played for Vaal Professionals, Free State Stars, Mother City, Bloemfontein Celtic, AmaZulu, Black Leopards, Jomo Cosmos and Mpumalanga Black Aces.

== Playing career ==
Khumalo was born in Sasolburg and began his professional career with Vaal Professionals in 1998.

He later played for Free State Stars, Bloemfontein Celtic, AmaZulu, Black Leopards and Jomo Cosmos. He moved from Amazulu to Black Leopards in early 2003.

At Free State Stars, Khumalo primarily served as backup to Kennedy Mweene. He didn't play for the team for 8 months until March 2008.

In 2010 he moved from Free State Stars to Mpumalanga Black Aces, after being recommended to the cub by their goalkeeping coach Cyprian Maimane. The club offered to pay for his accommodation but failed to do so, and Khumalo was nearly evicted by the landlord.

== Coaching career ==
He worked as a goalkeeping coach at Free State Stars for a number of years, before being sacked in December 2017.

By September 2024 he was a coach at Tshakhuma Tsha Madzivhandila.

== Playing style ==
Khumalo described his style as "a good shot-stopper and a good organiser of his back four [who] can play the ball out from the back."
