= Mbongeni Khumalo =

South African poet (born 1976)

Mbongeni Khumalo (born 15 July 1976) is a South African performance poet, poet and writer. He was born in Soweto. His poems and short stories have appeared in New Coin, Global Fire, Tribute, Timbila and Botsotso. In 1999 he won a merit award from the English Academy of South Africa.

== Poetry ==
- Apocrypha, Timbila Poetry Project and Bila Publishers (2003)
- Throbbing Ink, (co-author) Timbila Poetry Project (2003)
