= JVW Girls =

JVW Development Team
- Full name: JVW FC
- Nicknames: Sapphires (U-20); The Gems (academy)
- Short name: JVW
- Founded: 2012; 14 years ago
- Stadium: Jeppe Quondam
- Capacity: 1000
- Owner(s): Janine Van Wyk and Lauren Duncan
- Manager: (South Africa) Ronald Molepo U-20 (South Africa) Samuel Dube (U16) (South Africa) Cebile Maseko (U14)
- League: Sasol Women's League; Gauteng Women's Development League
- Website: https://www.jvw5.co.za/

JVW Girls also known as JVW Sapphires or JVW Gems is a women's soccer academy based in Bedfordview, Gauteng. The U/20 team competes in the Sasol Women's League, the second tier women's league in South Africa while the U/14 and U/16 teams compete in the Gauteng Women's Development League, the Gauteng regional women's football league for U/14 and U/16 teams in the province. It is the academy of JVW.

== Sapphires ==
In March 2024, they won the Pirates Cup (Women). They won 4-3 via penalties defeating Mamelodi Sundowns Ladies after the match ended in a 1–1 draw.

== Gems ==
In 2018 they became the first team to represent South Africa at the Dana Cup in Denmark.

In their first match of the 2019 tournament they won 2–0 against Stokke IL from Norway.

The U/16 Gems played in the inaugural 2023 U-15 Gauteng Women's Development League where they finished runner's up with 44 points (14 wins, 2 draws and 2 losses). They were runners-up in the inaugural pre-season tournament GWDL Top 8 losing the final 4–2 to Mamelodi Sundowns Ladies U/16.

== Current Squad ==
•Bold indicate that the player has made an appearance for JVW senior team.

This team was selected for ENGEN Knockout Challenge tournament. It's a mixture of reserve team, U/16, regional team and some plays for senior team.

=== U20 Squad ===
Note: Flags indicate national team as defined under FIFA eligibility rules; some limited exceptions apply. Players may hold more than one non-FIFA nationality.

No.	Pos.	Nation	Player
1	GK	RSA	**Casey Gordon**
—	GK	RSA	Skyla Coutinho
—	DF	RSA	**Taylor Berkovic**
—	DF	RSA	Sibiya Mahomed
—	DF	RSA	Gabriela Kelly-Niemack
—	DF	RSA	Katlego Mohale
—	DF	RSA	Meka Rademeyer
—	DF	RSA	Sinonhlanhla Nkosi
—	MF	RSA	**Mmabatho Mogale**

No.	Pos.	Nation	Player
—	MF	RSA	Bonolo Mokoma
9	MF	RSA	**Julia Goncalves**
—	MF	RSA	Mmamohloding Selolo
—	MF	RSA	Reitumetse Mosude
—	MF	RSA	Unathi Phakathi
21	FW	RSA	**Tanna Hollis**
—	FW	RSA	Tatiana Correia
—	FW	RSA	Cameron Hall
—	FW	RSA	Thorisho Mphelo
—	FW	RSA	Ofentse Maphepha
—	FW	RSA	Musa Mashaba

Management

Position	Name
Head Coach(es)	Ronald Molepo Samuel Dube

Position	Name
U/16 Head Coach	Kenneth Sthole
U/14 Head Coach	Claudia Raposo

== Notable players ==
=== FIFA U-17 Women's World Cup ===
List of players that were called up for a FIFA U-17 Women's World Cup while playing for the academy. In brackets, the tournament played:

- Jessica Wade (2018)

== Honours ==
U-20

- Pirates Cup (Women): 2024
- ENGEN Knockout Challenge: Runners up: 2022, 2023,2025 Third: 2024

U-16

- Gauteng Women's Development League: runners-up: 2023
- GWDL Top 8: runners-up: 2024

U-13

- Gauteng Women's Development League: 2025
