= Khumalo gang =

South African criminal gang

- Years active: 1991-1993
- Territory: Joe Slovo, Cape Town
- Criminal activities: contract killings, intimidation, extortion
- Allies: Inkatha Freedom Party

The Khumalo gang was an armed group in the Joe Slovo section in South Africa. It was led by Mbhekiseni Khumalo, the founder of a small Zionist Christian sect. It was allied with the Inkatha Freedom Party.
