= CECAFA U-15 Championship =

African youth football tournament

- Current season, competition or edition: 2019 CECAFA U-15 Championship
- Sport: Football
- Founded: 2019
- First season: 2019
- Related competitions: CECAFA Cup; CECAFA U-17 Championship

The CECAFA U-15 Championship is a football tournament organized by CECAFA. Held for the first time in 2019, it includes national under 15 teams from East and Central Africa.

== Past winners ==
Year	Winners	Scoreline	Finalists	Hosts
2019; Details	Uganda	4-0	Kenya	Eritrea
2023; Details	Zanzibar	1-1 (4-3 P)	Uganda	Uganda
