= Desmond Barker =

South African Air Force officer (1949–2021)

- Born: 25 August 1949; Pretoria
- Died: 17 March 2021 (aged 71)
- Military career
- Allegiance: South Africa
- Branch: South African Air Force
- Service years: 1968–2008
- Rank: Major General
- Awards: Southern Cross Medal

Desmond Barker (25 August 1949 – 15 March 2021) was a South African Air Force officer. His air force career spanned over four decades including time as the SAAF's Chief Test Pilot, air attaché in London, air base commander, and a member of its aerobatic display team. He was awarded the Southern Cross Medal and made an Honorary Fellow of the Royal Aeronautical Society.

== Early life ==
Barker was born on 25 August 1949 in Pretoria and attended Lyttelton Manor High School. He was the third generation in his family to join the South African Air Force (SAAF).

== Air Force career ==
Barker joined the air force in 1968 and completed his pilot training in 1969.

His first posting was to Combat Flying School SAAF from 1970 to 1983 before moving to Central Flying School at Langebaanweg, flying the Impala. He also flew Canberras at 12 Squadron.

He started training as a test pilot in 1984 and graduated in 1985. He was posted to 1 Squadron and flew the Mirage F1AZ. During this time he was seconded to Armscor, testing the Cheetah. For his contribution to flight-testing he was awarded the Southern Cross Medal in 1990. A year later he was appointed Chief Test Pilot at the Test Flight and Development Centre in the Overberg base.

After attending the Senior Command and Staff Course in 1995, he was appointed Officer Commanding of the Test Flight and Development Centre and on 30 January 1996 he was promoted to colonel.

In 2000 he was posted to South Africa's High Commission in London as Air Attaché, returning in 2003 to attend the Executive National Security Programme at the South African National Defence Force College. In January 2004 he was appointed General Officer Commanding Air Force Base Makhado in the rank of brigadier general. He was assigned as Chief Director Force Preparation in June 2006, and promoted to major general.

He was a member of the SAAF's aerobatic display team, the Silver Falcons.

Barker retired from the SAAF in May 2008.

== Later career ==
After leaving the SAAF, Barker joined the Council for Scientific and Industrial Research as the Manager of Aeronautics Research until March 2017.

He accumulated 7200 flying hours and flew 58 different types of aircraft. At the time of his death, Barker maintained his flying career as a civilian experimental test pilot. He was vice president of the South African Society of Experimental Test Pilots (SETP).

In 2011 he was awarded the SETP European Flight Test Safety Award.

He published a number of books, including Zero Error Margin – Display Flying Analysed (2003). In 2018 Barker was made an Honorary Fellow of the Royal Aeronautical Society.

== Death ==
Barker died in March 2021, in the crash of a Patchen TSC-2 Explorer 2000 Registration Number ZU-UGF from the SAAF museum.
