= Gauteng Development League =

- Organising body: SAFA Gauteng
- Founded: 2011; 15 years ago
- Country: South Africa
- Province: Gauteng
- Number of clubs: 80
- Level on pyramid: 3
- Relegation to: Gauteng Development Promotional League
- Domestic cup: Gauteng Development League Top 8
- Current champions: Under 13: Mamelodi Sundowns (1st title) Under 14: Kaizer Chiefs (1st title); Under 15: Mamelodi Sundowns (3rd title); Under 17: Mamelodi Sundowns (2nd title) Under 19: Mamelodi Sundowns (2nd title) (2025)
- Broadcaster(s): Supersport Schools
- Website: safagauteng.org.za

The Gauteng Development League is a youth association football development league launched in 2011 by SAFA Gauteng. The league is for youth development for boys in different age groups. It features clubs from all over the province of Gauteng.

== History ==
When Gauteng Development League was launched in 2017, there were just nine teams. It has grown to have 80 teams, with 20 teams in each division: U13, U15, U17 and U19.

In 2020 the league was interrupted by COVID-19.

In 2025 Siwelele bought the Premiership status of SuperSport United and took over the academy in the GDL.

== Champions ==
=== U/13 Division ===
Year	Champion	Runners-up
2020	Orlando Pirates	School of Excellence
2021	Kaizer Chiefs	Supersport United
2022	Kaizer Chiefs	Supersport United
2023	Kaizer Chiefs	Mamelodi Sundowns
2024	Kaizer Chiefs	Mamelodi Sundowns
2025	Mamelodi Sundowns	Supersport United

=== U/14 Division ===
Year	Champion	Runners-up
2024	Tuks High School	Kathorus Hyper Academy
2025	Kaizer Chiefs	Mamelodi Sundowns

=== U/15 Division ===
Year	Champion	Runners-up
2020	Mamelodi Sundowns	Supersport United
2021	Kathorus Hyper Academy	Mamelodi Sundowns
2022	School of Excellence	Mamelodi Sundowns
2023	Kaizer Chiefs	Mamelodi Sundowns
2024	Mamelodi Sundowns	Kaizer Chiefs
2025	Mamelodi Sundowns	Kaizer Chiefs

The league was cancelled due to COVID-19 pandemic. There was no winner, but Mamelodi Sundowns were on top of the table at the cancellation of the league.

=== U/17 Division ===
Year	Champion	Runners-up
2020	Bidvest Wits	Kaizer Chiefs
2021	Supersport United	Mamelodi Sundowns
2022	Highlands Park	Kaizer Chiefs
2023	Supersport United	Kaizer Chiefs
2024	Mamelodi Sundowns	Remember Elite Sports Academy
2025	Mamelodi Sundowns	Kaizer Chiefs

=== U/19 Division ===
Year	Champion	Runners-up
2021	Kaizer Chiefs	Jomo Cosmos
2022	Mamelodi Sundowns	Highlands Park
2023	Highlands Park	Mamelodi Sundowns
2024	Highlands Parks	Mamelodi Sundowns
2025	Mamelodi Sundowns	Highlands Park

== GDL Top 8 winners ==
=== U/13 ===
Under 13 Top 8 winners
Year	Champion	Runners-up	Ref
2024	Kaizer Chiefs	Mamelodi Sundowns	
2025	Kaizer Chiefs	SuperSport United	
2026	Mamelodi Sundowns	Siwelele	

=== U/14 ===
Under 14 Top 8 winners
Year	Champion	Runners-up	Ref
2026	Kaizer Chiefs	Highlands Park	

=== U/15 ===
Under 15 Top 8 winners
Year	Champion	Runners-up	Ref
2024	Mamelodi Sundowns	Tuks High School	
2025	Mamelodi Sundowns	Kaizer Chiefs	
2026	Mamelodi Sundowns	Siwelele	

=== U/17 ===
Under 17 Top 8 winners
Year	Champion	Runners-up	Ref
2024	Kaizer Chiefs	Highlands Park	
2025	SuperSport United	Remember Elite Sports Academy	
2026	Siwelele	Kaizer Chiefs	

=== U/19 ===
Under 19 Top 8 winners
Year	Champion	Runners-up	Ref
2024	SuperSport United	Mamelodi Sundowns	
2025	SuperSport United	SAFA Transnet School of Excellence	
2026	Kaizer Chiefs	Remember Elite Sports Academy	

== Gauteng Women's Development League ==
Gauteng Women's Development League
- Organising body: SAFA Gauteng
- Founded: 2023; 3 years ago
- Country: South Africa
- Province: Gauteng
- Domestic cup: GWDL Top 8 Championship
- Current champions: Under 13: JWV (1st title) Under 15: SAFA Academy (1st title) Under 17: Mamelodi Sundowns (3rd title) (2025)
- Broadcaster(s): SuperSport Schools
- Website: safagauteng.org.za

The Gauteng Women's Development League is a provincial girls soccer league in Gauteng. The league is run by SAFA Gauteng, and features teams from the Local Football Associations (LFAs) that are under SAFA Gauteng.

== History ==
The initial season featured 10 teams and was launched on 16 April 2023 with only the under-15 age group available. In 2024, the league added the under-14 league and switch the under-15 age group to under-16.

In the 2024 season opener for the under-16 division, Mamelodi Sundowns scored a record 14 goals in a 14-1 in over West Youth Academy. In the under-14 division, the first matches were played on 24 March 2024 which saw 30 goals being scored in the season opener.

Mamelodi Sundowns won both leagues undefeated in 2024.

In 2025 the under-13 age group was added and the inaugural winners were JVW. The winners and runners-ups of the under-17 league in 2025 qualified for the CAF U-17 Girls Integrated Football Tournament-COSAFA region. Refilwe were chosen to partake in the tournament as they finished third behind SAFA Academy.

== Champions ==
The list of champions and runners-up:

=== U/13 division ===
Year	Champions	Runners-up
2025	JVW	Refilwe

=== U/15 division ===
Year	Champions	Runners-up
2024	Mamelodi Sundowns	Tuks High School
2025	SAFA Academy	Panorama F.C.

=== U/17 division ===
Year	Champions	Runners-up
2023	Mamelodi Sundowns	JVW
2024	Mamelodi Sundowns	JVW
2025	Mamelodi Sundowns	SAFA Academy

== GWDL Top 8 winners ==
=== U/13 ===
Under-13 Top 8 winners
Year	Champion	Runners-up	Ref
2026	Mamelodi Sundowns	Refilwe	

=== U/15 ===
Under-15 Top 8 winners
Year	Champion	Runners-up	Ref
2026	Panorama	Tuks High School	

=== U/17 ===
The winners U/17 Top 8 cup
Year	Champions	Runners-up	Ref
2024	Mamelodi Sundowns	JVW	
2026	Mamelodi Sundowns	Refilwe	

== Broadcasting ==
The GDL and GDWL games are broadcast on the SuperSport Schools channel.
