= Hillview High School =

Public school in Gauteng, South Africa

Coordinates: 25°47′23.27″S 28°16′47.28″E

Location
- 71 Franzina Street, Roseville; Pretoria, Gauteng; South Africa

Information
- School type: Public school
- Motto: Levabo Oculos Latin: "I will lift (mine) my eyes"
- Established: 1955; 71 years ago
- Founder: -
- School district: District 9
- School number: 012 335 2271
- Headmaster: Dr MM Phalane
- Staff: approx. 50 full-time
- Grades: 8–12
- Gender: Boys & Girls
- Age: 14 to 18
- Enrollment: 1,500 pupils
- Language: English
- Schedule: 07:30 - 13:55
- Campus: Urban Campus
- Campus type: Suburban
- Houses: Mambas Buffalos Lions Cheetahs
- Colours: Green; Red; White
- Accreditation: Gauteng Department of Education
- Website: http://www.hillviewhighschool.co.za

Hillview High School is a public English medium co-educational high school in Pretoria, South Africa. The school was established in 1955 and is one of the oldest schools in the city. The school moved to the current campus in the suburb of Roseville, in 1979 from a location closer to the city centre.

== Sport ==
Sport is not compulsory, as the school believes that the success and enjoyment is with voluntary participation.

Sporting facilities include, athletics grounds, several tennis courts and hockey fields, a basketball court (outdoor), several netball fields and soccer fields.

The School offers the following sports:

- Athletics
- Basketball
- Chess
- Cricket
- Cross Country
- Field Hockey
- Football
- Netball
- Softball
- Swimming
- Tennis

Hillview High School is part of the Pretoria English Medium High Schools Athletics Association (PEMHSAA). Other schools participating in PEMHSAA are:

- Clapham High School
- The Glen High School
- Lyttelton Manor High School
- Pretoria Technical High School
- Pretoria Secondary School
- Sutherland High School, Centurion
- Willowridge High School

== Location ==
The school was founded in 1955 on the site of the former Prinshof Primary School (corner Du Toit and Savage streets) near the city centre. The school moved from the city centre to Franzina Street in Roseville in 1979. The old buildings made the news after 6 July 1991 when they were bombed by members of the AWB.

== Photographs ==
Photographs of the old school (taken in October 2007)

Photographs of the new school (taken in October 2007)

.

== Motto ==
The school motto is Levabo oculos ("I will lift [my] eyes" in Latin). The old school anthem was based on Psalm 121 which starts with "I to the hills will lift my eyes" in the Scottish Psalter. "Levabo oculos" is the incipit of the traditional Latin version of this psalm: Levabo oculos meos in montes unde veniet auxilium mihi.

== Principals ==
- MM Phalane (current)
- Johan Hepburn (2004-2017)
- Naomi Myburgh (1993–2004)
- Geoff D Grover (1986–1993)
- JF McDougall (1978–1985)
- Kamogelo Yves (1955-1977)

== Houses ==
The houses used for sporting and other activities are named after cities in ancient Greece. Their names and associated colours are:

- Athens - Green
- Olympia - Blue
- Sparta - Red
- Troy - Yellow
- stunna4yves - Orange
