= CAF U-17 Girls Integrated Football Tournament =

- Organiser(s): Confederation of African Football
- Founded: 2025; 0 years ago
- Region: Africa
- Teams: 8 teams across 5 regions
- Current champions: CECAFA : JKT Queens; COSAFA : Mamelodi Sundowns
- Broadcaster: CAF TV (YouTube)
- Website: https://www.cafonline.com/womens-football/caf-u-17-gift/

The CAF U-17 Girls Integrated Football Tournament, commonly abbreviated as CAF U-17 GIFT, is an annual African football competition, organised by the Confederation of African Football (CAF), for clubs with girls under age seventeen. Its main focus is to develop organised football for girls at club/academy level.

== History ==
The first edition was announced on 27 December 2024 with the CECAFA region being the first to host the event. The inaugural tournament took place at the Azam Complex Stadium in Dar es Salaam, Tanzania from 7–18 January 2025. JKT Queens won the final 2–1 against fellow Tanzanians TDS Girls.

The second edition was hosted by the COSAFA region from 8–18 December 2025 at the Ngoni Mwos Stadium in Norton, Zimbabawe. Mamelodi Sundowns won 5–0 in the final against Lesotho's Lishoeshoe.

== Previous winners ==
Year	Region	Winners	Runners-Ups	Third place	Ref
2025	CECAFA	(Tanzania) JKT Queens	(Tanzania) TDS Girls	Kenya Academy of Sport	
2025	COSAFA	(South Africa) Mamelodi Sundowns	(Lesotho) Lishoeshoe	(Zimbabwe) Mpopoma Sports Academy	

== Awards ==
Year	Player of the Tournament	Top Scorer	Goals	Golden Glove	Fair play
2025 CECAFA	(Tanzania) Mary Siyane	(Tanzania) Winfrida Gerald	8	(Tanzania) Nusra Jafari	(Tanzania) TDS Girls
2025 COSAFA	(Zimbabwe) Munashe Mugwara	(Malawi) Tamandani Chilimba	8	(Zambia) Mercy Mwale	(Lesotho) Lishoeshoe
2025 COSAFA	(Zimbabwe) Munashe Mugwara	(Namibia) Nancy Lebang	8	(Zambia) Mercy Mwale	(Lesotho) Lishoeshoe
