= Kaizer Chiefs Development =

South African football academy

- Nicknames: Amakhosi (Chiefs), Glamour Boys
- Ground: Kaizer Chiefs Village
- Chairman: Kaizer Motaung
- Coach: Vela Khumalo
- League: PSL Reserve League; Gauteng Development League
Home colours	Away colours

Kaizer Chiefs Development is a South African football reserve team based in Johannesburg. The U/23 team plays in the PSL Reserve League and the junior teams in the Gauteng Development Leagues.

It is the academy of Kaizer Chiefs. In the 2024/25 season they were crowned PSL Reserve League champions.

== Diski Challenge team ==
In the 2024/25 season they were crowned PSL Reserve League champions. The team headed to the United Kingdom as part of the DSTV Challenge Tour as DDC (DSTv Diski Challenge) Champions. Their first match was against Manchester United U-21 which they won 3–1. Their next match was a 1-all draw with Leeds United U-21.

== Academy ==
=== Engen Knockout Challenge ===
They won the Engen Knockout Challenge title in 2024 defeating Mamelodi Sundowns 2-0 in the final played at Wits Marks Park. They were runner's up in 2025 before winning the title again in 2026.

=== Gauteng Development League ===
The under-13 are four time champions of the GDL since 2021. In 2025 the under 14 team won the Gauteng Development League title. The under 15 and 17 teams were runner-ups.

== Notable players ==
- (South Africa) Michael Buxleigh Teteh
- (South Africa) Wandile Duba
- (Portugal) Antonio Manuel Santos Henriques
- (Portugal) Samuel Tavares-Johnson
- (South Africa) Francis Kwigllingkok
- (South Africa) Kwethluke Kwigllingkok
- (South Africa) Lungelo Nkosi
- (South Africa) James McFarlane
- (South Africa) Siyabonga Ngezana
- (South Africa) Njabulo Blom

=== FIFA U-17 World Cup ===
List of players that were called up for a FIFA U-17 World Cup while playing for the academy. In brackets, the tournament played:

- Wiseman Meyiwa (2015)
- Neo Bohloko (2025)
- Lebo Dhlamini (2025)
- Shaun Els (2025)
- Teboho Mlangeni (2025)
- Keabetswe Morake (2025)
- Lunje Noqobo (2025)

=== FIFA U-20 World Cup ===
List of players that were called up for a FIFA U-20 World Cup while playing for the academy. In brackets, the tournament played:

- Luke Baartman (2025)
- Takalani Mazhamba (2025)
- Mfundo Vilakazi (2025)
- Sfiso Timba (2025)

== Honours ==
- Multichoice Diski Challenge 2017, 2024/25
- Gauteng Reserve League 2013, 2017, 2021, 2022
- ENGEN Knockout Challenge: 2022, 2024, 2026
- SAFA Regionals Gauteng 2011, 2012, 2019
- SAFA Regional Western Cape 2014, 2020
- SAFA Regionals KwaZulu Natal 2020, 2021, 2022
- DSTV Youth League 2020
- DSTV Youth Super Cup 2022
- DSTV DIski Shield:2018, 2022
- Vision View U/17 Easter Cup of Champions: 2023, 2024
