= Edendale Technical High School =

Location
- 790 Garden Road; Edendale; Pietermaritzburg, KwaZulu-Natal, 3217; South Africa
- Coordinates: 29°38′56″S 30°17′12″E

Information
- School type: Public School, High School
- Motto: Zulu: Khuthala Uthuthuke (Stay Active)
- Founded: 1956
- School district: Umgungundlovu
- Principal: Mr Tobias Ngubane
- Grades: 8 – 12
- Gender: Girls and Boys
- Age: 14 to 18
- Enrollment: >1000
- Classes offered: English (First Additional Language), Zulu (Home Language), Mathematics, Mathematics Paper 3, Life Orientation, Electrical Technology, Woodwork Technology, Mechanical Technology, Accounting, Tourism, Life Science, Physical Sciences
- Language: Zulu and English
- Hours in school day: 07.30-14.00
- Colour: Maroon
- Nickname: Vo
- Telephone No: (033) 399-5506

Edendale Technical High School is a public school in South Africa.

== Overview ==
Edendale Technical High school is situated in Edendale to the west of Pietermaritzburg, KwaZulu Natal. The school is a mixed gender even though when it was initially opened to only cater for boys. In 1996 the school allowed girls to also enroll.

In 2016 the school celebrated its 60th anniversary.

== Notable alumni ==
1. Mr Justice Jeremiah Shongwe, judge of the Supreme Court of Appeal of South Africa
2. Mr Andries Tshabalala Pr. Eng. B.Sc. Eng., executive director of Alstom SA (Pty) Ltd and past president of the South African Institute of Electrical Engineers

== Sport ==
A full programme of sporting activities is available. Sports offered by the school include:

- Volleyball
- Netball
- Football
- Tennis

Other extramural activities include:

- Chess
- Choir
- Quiz
- School band

== Campus ==
The campus has:

- a library,
- a computer centre and
- three workshops

== Awards and honours ==
The school is one of the best performing schools in Edendale with in which more than 80% of candidates pass the matriculation examinations.

According to the Department of Education 2014 results Edendale Technical School 91% of its matric candidates passed, and in 2013 81% passed and in 2012 the pass rate was 75%. The pass rates for mathematics and science remain low.
