= CAF African Schools Football Championship =

- Organiser(s): CAF
- Founded: 2022; 4 years ago
- Region: Africa
- Current champions: Boys: Senegal; Girls: Ghana
- Most championships: Boys: Tanzania (2 titles); Girls: Ghana (2 titles)
- Broadcaster(s): CAF TV (YouTube); SuperSport
- Motto: "Play Now"
- Website: www.cafonline.com/caf-african-school-football-championship

The CAF African Schools Football Championship is an annual African schools association football competition for boys and girls aged 15 and under, launched in 2022 and organised by the Confederation of African Football (CAF). Its main focus is to develop organised football at school level on the continent for boys and girls.

== History ==
On 11 May 2022 CAF president Dr. Patrice Motsepe launched the initial project in Maputo, Mozambique. The inaugural tournament took place at the King Zwelithini Stadium in Durban from 5–8 April 2023. It featured U16 boys’ and girls’ competitions before transitioning to U15 championships for both divisions in its second edition the following year. Guinea's CS Ben Sekou Sylla won the inaugural boys title 5-4 via penalties against Clapham High School of South Africa after the match ended in a 1-1 draw. In the girls edition, Tanzania's Fountain Gate School won the inaugural title 3-0 against Ecole Omar IBN Khatab of Morocco.

The second edition was held from 21–24 May 2024 at Amaan Stadium in Zanzibar. Hosts Tanzania won the boys edition defeating defending champions Guinea 1-0 in the final. In the girls edition, South Africa defeated Morocco 5-4 via penalties after the matched ended in a 1-1 draw.

The third edition was held from 21–26 April 2025 at the University of Ghana in Accra, Ghana. Defending champions Tanzania won the boys edition 3-2 via penalties against Senegal after the match ended in a 0-0 draw. Hosts Ghana defeated Uganda 2-0 in the girls edition to win their maiden title.

The fourth edition was held in Harare, Zimbabwe from 2–10 April 2026. Senegal won their maiden title defeating Uganda 5-4 via penalties after the match ended in a goalless draw. Defending champions Ghana won the girls edition 9-8 via penalties against Burkina Faso after their match also ended in a goalless draw.

== Winners ==
A list of past winners for the boys and girls competitions:

=== U16 Boys ===
Edition	Year	Host	Final			Third Place Match		
Edition	Year	Host	Winner	Score	Runner-up	Third Place	Score	Fourth Place
1	2023	(South Africa) Durban	(Guinea); CS Ben Sekou Sylla	1–1 (5–4 p)	(South Africa); Clapham High School	(Malawi); Salima Secondary School	3–1	(Benin); CEG Sainte Rita

=== U15 Boys ===
Edition	Year	Host	Final			Third Place Match		
Edition	Year	Host	Winner	Score	Runner-up	Third Place	Score	Fourth Place
2	2024	(Tanzania) Zanzibar City	Tanzania	1–0	Guinea	Senegal	0–0 (5–3 p)	Benin
3	2025	(Ghana) Accra	Tanzania	0–0 (3–1 p)	Senegal	Ghana	2–1	Uganda
4	2026	(Zimbabwe) Harare	Senegal	0–0 (5–4 p)	Uganda	Benin	1–0	Morocco

==== Participating nations for boys ====
Team	(South Africa) 2023 (8)	(Tanzania) 2024 (7)	(Ghana) 2025 (8)	(Zimbabwe) 2026 (8)	Years
Algeria	GS	×	GS	•	2
Benin	4th	4th	•	3rd	3
DR Congo	GS	×	GS	GS	3
Ghana	×	•	3rd		1
Guinea	1st	2nd	×		2
Ivory Coast	×	•	GS		1
Libya	×	GS	×		1
Malawi	3rd	•	•		1
Morocco	×	•	•	4th	1
Senegal	×	3rd	2nd	1st	3
South Africa	2nd	GS	GS		3
Tanzania	×	1st	1st	GS	3
Tunisia	GS	×	•		1
Uganda	GS	GS	4th	2nd	4
Zambia	×	•	•	GS	1
Zimbabwe	×	•	•	GS	1

Legend

- 1st – Champions
- 2nd – Runners-up
- 3rd – Third place
- 4th – Fourth place
- GS – Group stage
- Q – Qualified
- – Hosts
- × – Did not enter
- • – Did not qualify
- × – Withdrew before qualification
- – Withdrew after qualification
- – Disqualified after qualification

=== U16 Girls ===
Edition	Year	Host	Final			Third Place Match		
Edition	Year	Host	Winner	Score	Runner-up	Third Place	Score	Fourth Place
1	2023	(South Africa) Durban	(Tanzania); Fountain Gate School	3–0	(Morocco); Ecole Omar Ibn El-Khatab	(The Gambia); Scan Aid	0–0 (4–3 p)	(Republic of the Congo); CSG de Mfilou

=== U15 Girls ===
Edition	Year	Host	Final			Third Place Match		
Edition	Year	Host	Winner	Score	Runner-up	Third Place	Score	Fourth Place
2	2024	(Tanzania) Zanzibar City	South Africa	1–1 (5–4 p)	Morocco	Uganda	1–0	Tanzania
3	2025	(Ghana) Accra	Ghana	2–0	Uganda	South Africa	2–1	Morocco
4	2026	(Zimbabwe) Harare	Ghana	0–0 (9–8 p)	Burkina Faso	Zambia	2–0	Morocco

==== Participating nations for girls ====
Team	(South Africa) 2023 (7)	(Tanzania) 2024 (7)	(Ghana) 2025 (8)	(Zimbabwe) 2026 (8)	Years
Benin	GS	•	GS		2
Burkina Faso	×	•	•	2nd	1
Congo	4th	GS	×		2
DR Congo	×	×	GS	GS	2
Gambia	3rd	GS	GS		3
Ghana	×	•	1st	1st	2
Guinea	×	×	×	GS	1
Malawi	×	•	GS		1
Morocco	2nd	2nd	4th	4th	4
Seychelles	GS	×	×		1
South Africa	GS	1st	3rd		3
Tanzania	1st	4th	•	GS	3
Togo	×	GS	×		1
Uganda	×	3rd	2nd		2
Zambia	×	•	•	3rd	1
Zimbabwe	×	•	•	GS	1

Legend

- 1st – Champions
- 2nd – Runners-up
- 3rd – Third place
- 4th – Fourth place
- GS – Group stage
- Q – Qualified
- – Hosts
- × – Did not enter
- • – Did not qualify
- × – Withdrew before qualification
- – Withdrew after qualification
- – Disqualified after qualification

== Prizes ==
The tournament received a donation of US$10,000,000 from the Motsepe Foundation, which set the prize money split at zonal and continental level.

Final position	Regional price money	Finals price money
Champions	US$100,000	US$300,000
Runners-up	US$75,000	US$200,000
Third place	US$50,000	US$150,000

== Awards ==
=== Boys ===
Tournament	Player of the Tournament	Golden Boot	Goals	Golden Glove	Fair Play
2023	(South Africa) Kagiso Maloka	(Guinea) Mohamed Sacko	5	(Guinea) Ibrahima Camara	(Algeria) Boulawech Boumerdes School
2024	(Tanzania) Abel Samson	(Guinea) Asmara Keita	3	(Tanzania) Mujahid Juma	South Africa
2025	(Senegal) Souleymane Commissaire Faye	(Ghana) John Andor (Ghana) Ingatus Cyril Acquah Hagan	3	(Tanzania) Rajabu Manyelezi	Tanzania
2026	(Senegal) Bara Gueye	(Uganda) Owen Mukisa	5	(Senegal) Prosper Pareira	Morocco

=== Girls ===
Tournament	Player of the Tournament	Golden Boot	Goals	Golden Glove	Fair Play
2023	(Tanzania) Winfrida Gerald	(Tanzania) Winfrida Gerald	11	(Tanzania) Allic Neckema	(Seychelles) Anse Boileau Secondary School
2024	(Morocco) Meryem Oubella	(Uganda) Shadia Nabrye	3	(South Africa) Sphumelele Zibula	Gambia
2025	(Ghana) Jennifer Awuku	(South Africa) Pulane Moloi	5	(Ghana) Precious Akenguwie	Morocco
2026	(Ghana) Christiana Ashiaku	(Zambia) Phida Muzuwa	5	(Burkina Faso) Naffisatou Zabre	Zambia
