= List of South Africa women's international soccer players =

This is a list of South Africa women's international soccer players who have played for the South Africa women's national football team.

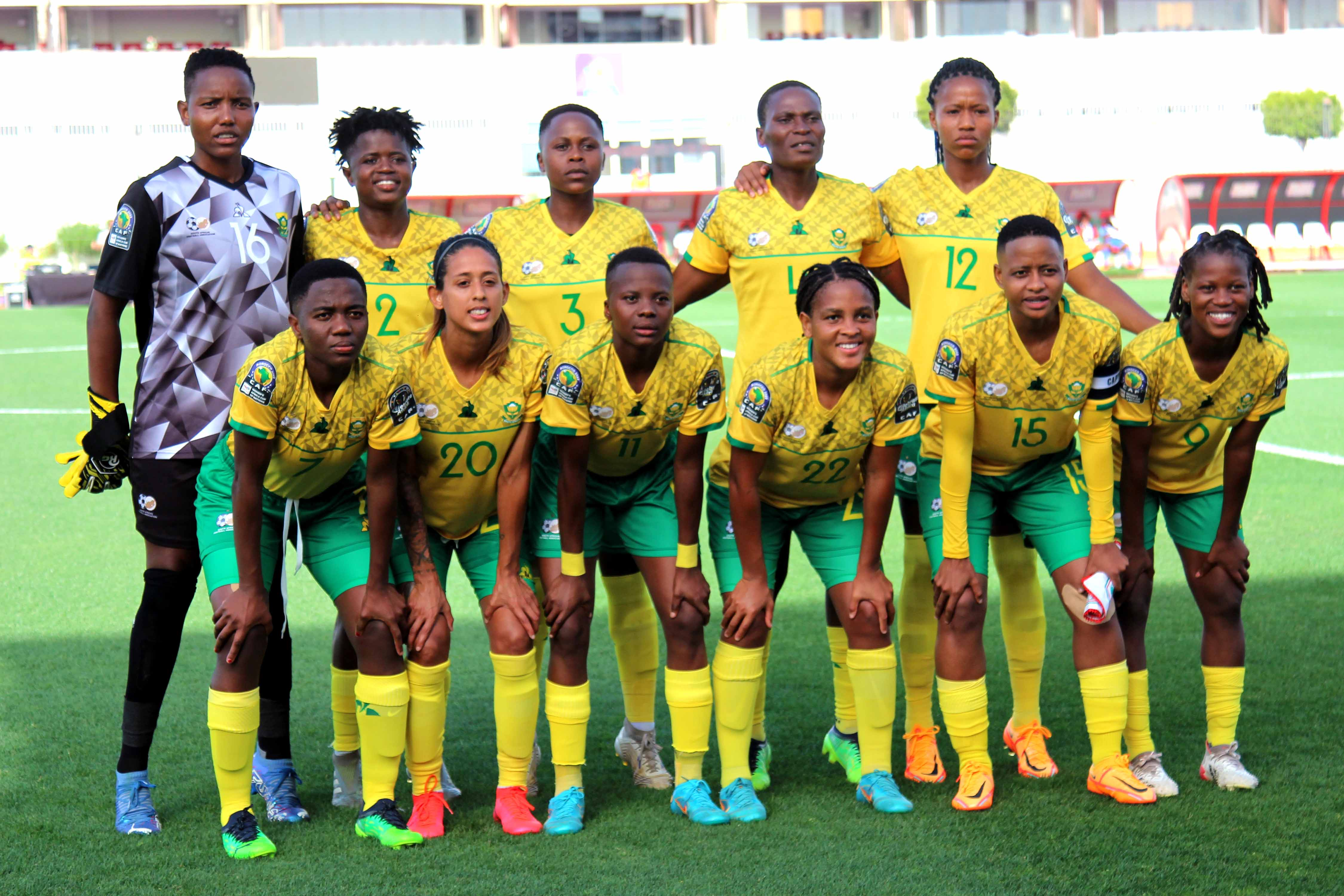
Banyana Banyana starting XI at the 2022 Women's Africa Cup of Nations in Morocco.

Positions key
GK	Goalkeeper
DF	Defender
MF	Midfielder
FW	Forward

== List of players ==
Player	Position	Years active	Goals
Roxanne Barker	GK	2010–	
Kholosa Biyana	MF	2018–	2
Nomfundo Buthelezi	MF	2023–	
Zamandosi Cele	DF	2012–	
Noxolo Cesane	MF	2019-	4
Sinoxolo Cesane	MF	2023-	
Chelsea Daniels	FW	2023-	
Lelona Daweti	FW	2022-	
Gugu Dhlamini	MF	2024-	
Karabo Dhlamini	DF/MF	2019-	1
Amanda Dlamini	MF	2007–2018	24
Andile Dlamini	GK	2011-	
Ronnel Donnelly	FW	2025-	
Chantelle Esau	FW		
Ode Fulutudilu	FW	2014–2019	
Bongeka Gamede	DF	2019-	
Casey Gordons	GK	2024-	
Asanda Hadebe	DF/MF	2021-	
Kesha Hendricks	MF	2024-	4
Gabisile Hlumbane	MF	2010–	
Tanna Hollis	FW	2024-	
Sibulele Holweni	MF	2019-	16
Melinda Kgadiete	FW	2018–2023	3
Thembi Kgatlana	FW	2014-	32
Nomvula Kgoale	MF	2019-	
Khwezi Khoza	FW	2025-	
Thato Letsoso	DF	2022-	
Kylie Louw	MF	2006–2012	7
Isabella Ludwig	MF	2024-	
Refiloe Jane	MF	2012-	16
Jade Jones	FW	2023-	
Shannon Macomo	DF	2024-	
Dineo Magagula	GK	2022-	
Hildah Magaia	FW	2018-	20
Fikile Magama	DF	2022-	
Mavis Maiacane	FW	2025-	
Mamello Makhabane	MF	2005–	18
Tiisetso Makhubela	DF	2022-	
Katleho Malebane	MF	2025-	
Stephanie Malherbe	MF	2016	
Nthabiseng Majiya	FW	2022-	
Sibahle Maneli	DF	2025-	
Morongwa Manemela	DF	2023-	
Nondumiso Manengela	MF	2024-	
Antonia Maponga	DF	2024-	
Matshidiso Masebe	GK	2024-	
Portia Masilela	FW	2025-	
Noko Matlou	FW/DF	2006–2024	66
Bambanani Mbane	DF	2016-	4
Nobahle Mdelwa	MF	2024-	2
Andisiwe Mgcoyi	FW	2010–2016	9
Sikelelwa Mhlanga	DF	2024-	
Lonathemba Mhlongo	DF	2022-	
Adrielle Mibe	MF	2025-	
Amanda Mkhize	FW	2022	
Sinamile Mkhwanazi	MF	2024-	2
Nicole Michael	MF	2023-	1
Thokozile Mndaweni	GK	–2020	
Portia Modise	FW	2000–2015	101
Mmabatho Mogale	MF	2022-	
Raesetja Mogale	DF	2023-	
Regina Mogolola	MF	2018-	
Katlego Mohale	MF	2025-	
Kgaelebane Mohlakoana	MF	2018-	
Lizza Mokoena	FW	2023-	
Bonolo Mokoma	FW	2025-	
Oratile Mokwena	MF	2022-	
Kebotseng Moletsane	GK	2012-	
Robyn Moodaly	MF	2011–2023	
Sanah Mollo	FW	2006–2016	21
Ayesha Moosa	MF	2023-	2
Amogelang Motau	MF	2016-	2
Linda Motlhalo	MF	2017-	21
Tshogofatso Motlogelwa	MF	2023-	3
Nokuphumula Mpatsiyana	GK	2024-	
Mapaseka Mpuru	GK	2019–	
Amanda Mthandi	MF	2018–	1
Nonhlanhla Mthandi	MF	2022-	5
Rhoda Mulaudzi	FW	2015–2023	
Victoria Tshidi Muroa	GK	2022-	
Busisiwe Ndimeni	MF	2018–2022	
Ntombifikile Ndlovu	DF	2023-	
Yolanda Nduli	DF	2024-	
Regirl Ngobeni	DK	2021–2024	
Lesego Nkoane	MF	2024-	
Khensani Nkuna	DF	2023-	
Shiwe Nogwanya	FW	2011–	2
Sibongile Ntoane	MF	2023-	
Sinazo Ntshota	MF	2022-	
Nomathemba Ntsibande	DF	2011–	6
Marry Ntsweng	MF	2007–	1
Nompumelelo Nyandeni	MF	2002–2025	39
Shakira O'Malley	DF	2024-	
Ntando Phahla	DF	2024-	1
Khutso Pila	DF	2024-	
Asa Rabalao	GK		
Lebohang Ramalepe	DF/MF	2014-	4
Sharol Ramaoka	DF	2022-	
Boitumelo Rasehlo	DF	2023-	
Gabriela Salgado	FW	2022-	6
Lithemba Sam	FW	2022-	
Michelle Sampson	FW	2022-	
Cimone Sauls	DF	2022-	
Samkelisiwe Selana	FW	2023-	
Jermaine Seoposenwe	FW	2010–2025	24
Amanda Sister	DF	2010–	2
Okuhle Sithole	MF	2025-	
Sphumelele Shamase	MF	2022-	
Thubelihle Shamase	MF	2022-	
Wendy Shongwe	DF/MF	2023-	
Unathi Simayile	DF	2023-	
Leandra Smeda	MF	2012–	22
Thalea Smidt	MF	2022-	
Kaylin Swart	GK	2016-	
Bongiwe Thusi	MF	2013-	
Koketso Tlailane	DF	2022-	
Janine van Wyk	DF	2005–2023	12
Nothando Vilakazi	DF	2007–2022	7
Zethembiso Vilakazi	FW	2022-	
Jessica Wade	MF	2025-	
Jessica Williams	GK	2019-	1
Jamie-Leigh Witbooi	MF	2022-	

== See also ==
- South Africa women's national soccer team
- Women's soccer in South Africa
