= 2022 Women's Varsity Football =

9th Women's Varsity Football

Tournament details
- Country: South Africa
- City: Soweto
- Venue: UJ Soweto Stadium
- Date: 11 October 2022 - 16 October 2022
- Teams: 8

Final positions
- Champions: University of Johannesburg
- Runners-up: University of the Western Cape
- Semifinalists: Tshwane University of Technology; University of Pretoria

Tournament statistics
- Matches played: 15
- Goals scored: 54 (3.6 per match)
- Top goal scorer(s): Sphumelele Shamase (7 goals)

Awards
- Best player: Sphumelele Shamase

Official website
- https://www.varsitysportssa.com/football-women-fixtures
- All statistics correct as of 17 May 2024.

The 2022 Women's Varsity Football was the ninth edition of the South African women's university soccer competition. It involved some of the top football playing universities in the country. The tournament is run by Varsity Sports SA, and is endorsed by the South African Football Association and University Sport South Africa. It was hosted at UJ Soweto Stadium by the University of Johannesburg.

The University of the Western Cape are defending champions. They lost the title via penalties (5-3) to the University of Johannesburg after the match ended in a 0-0 draw.

== Participating teams ==
The eight teams that competed in the 2022 Women's Varsity Football challenge are:

| Team name | University |
|---|---|
| UJ | University of Johannesburg |
| UWC | University of the Western Cape |
| UP-Tuks | University of Pretoria |
| NWU | North West University |
| UL | University of Limpopo |
| TUT | Tshwane University of Technology |
| Wits | University of the Witwatersrand |
| DUT | Durban University of Technology |

The teams were split into two groups as follows:

| Group A | Group B |
|---|---|
| DUT; TUT; UWC; Wits | NWU; UL; UJ; UP-Tuks |

== Round robin stage ==
=== Group A ===
| Pos | Team | Pld | W | D | L | GF | GA | GD | Pts | |
|---|---|---|---|---|---|---|---|---|---|---|
| 1 | UWC | 3 | 3 | 0 | 0 | 8 | 1 | +7 | 9 | Advance to Semi-Finals |
| 2 | TUT | 3 | 2 | 0 | 1 | 8 | 2 | +6 | 6 | Advance to Semi-Finals |
| 3 | Wits | 3 | 1 | 0 | 2 | 5 | 4 | +1 | 3 | |
| 4 | DUT | 3 | 0 | 0 | 3 | 1 | 15 | −14 | 0 | |

11 October
15:00 CAT UTC+02:00

| TUT | 5–0 | DUT |
|---|---|---|
| 24’ Tshogofatso Motlogelwa 25’ Own Goal; 31’ Yolisa Ntsabo; 59’ Nombulelo Khumalo 67’ Johanna Ramanna |

UJ Soweto Stadium
11 October
17:00 CAT UTC+02:00

| UWC | 1–0 | Wits |
|---|---|---|
| 57’ Lindokuhle Gladile |

UJ Soweto Stadium
12 October
15:00 CAT UTC+02:00

| TUT | 2–0 | Wits |
|---|---|---|
| 33′ Yolisa Ntsabo; 48′ Nicole Mohlala |

UJ Soweto Stadium
12 October
17:00 CAT UTC+02:00

| UWC | 5–0 | DUT |
|---|---|---|
| 12′ Keylon Pietersen 21′ 60′ Motau; 38′ Magama 49′ Akholiwe Matsotsi |

UJ Soweto Stadium
13 October
15:00 CAT UTC+02:00

| UWC | 2–1 | TUT |
|---|---|---|
| 17’ Tshegofatso Senanya; 90+1’ Gamede | | 58’ Tshogofatso Motlogelwa |

UJ Soweto Stadium
13 October
17:00 CAT UTC+02:00

| Wits | 5–1 | DUT |
|---|---|---|
| 2’ Ofentse Malape 14’ 22’ Nkoane 27’ 29' Shakeerah Jacobs | | 60’ Nokwanda Xulu |

UJ Soweto Stadium

=== Group B ===
| Pos | Team | Pld | W | D | L | GF | GA | GD | Pts | |
|---|---|---|---|---|---|---|---|---|---|---|
| 1 | UJ (H) | 3 | 3 | 0 | 0 | 12 | 0 | +12 | 9 | Advance to Semi-Finals |
| 2 | UP-Tuks | 3 | 2 | 0 | 1 | 8 | 4 | +4 | 6 | Advance to Semi-Finals |
| 3 | NWU | 3 | 0 | 1 | 2 | 3 | 10 | −7 | 1 | |
| 4 | UL | 3 | 0 | 1 | 2 | 3 | 12 | −9 | 1 | |

(H) Hosts

11 October
15:00 CAT UTC+02:00

| UJ | 4–0 | UP-Tuks |
|---|---|---|
| 45+4’ 49’ 51’ Shamase; 58’Boitumelo Rasehlo |

UJ Soweto Stadium
11 October
17:00 CAT UTC+02:00

| NWU | 3–3 | UL |
|---|---|---|
| 10' Noluthando Mohlontlo 46’ Lerato Monate 68’ Vonisiwe Maswanganyi | | 26’ Boniswa Makhale 45’ Sharon Matabathe 62’ Amukelani Kanyan |

UJ Soweto Stadium
12 October
15:00 CAT UTC+02:00

| UJ | 3–0 | NWU |
|---|---|---|
| 15′ Lesego Nhlapho 50′Shamase 63′ Ayesha Moosa |

UJ Soweto Stadium
12 October
17:00 CAT UTC+02:00

| UP-Tuks | 4–0 | UL |
|---|---|---|
| 6′ Shongwe 10′ Lesedi Petlane; 19′ Betty Mallela 32′ Sinamile Mkhwanazi |

UJ Soweto Stadium
13 October
15:00 CAT UTC+02:00

| UP-Tuks | 4–0 | NWU |
|---|---|---|
| 4’ Sinamile Mkhwanazi 33’ 59’ Shongwe 62’ Lethabo Ledwaba |

UJ Soweto Stadium
13 October
17:00 CAT UTC+02:00

| UJ | 5–0 | UL |
|---|---|---|
| 2’ 5’ Ayesha Moosa 39’ Shamase 64’ 65’ Lerato Lefa |

UJ Soweto Stadium

== Knockout stage ==
=== Semi finals ===
14 October
13:00 CAT UTC+02:00

| UJ | 5–1 | TUT |
|---|---|---|
| 16’ 24’ S. Shamase 44’ T. Shamase; 53’ Lerato Lefa 55’ Refiloe Maseko | | 41’ Tshogofatso Motlogelwa |

UJ Soweto Stadium
14 October
15:00 CAT UTC+02:00

| UWC | 0–0 | UP-Tuks |
Penalties
| | 4-3 |

UJ Soweto Stadium

=== Final ===
16 October
16:00 CAT UTC+02:00

| UJ | 0–0 | UWC |
Penalties
| | 5-3 |

UJ Soweto Stadium

== Sponsors ==
The tournament was sponsored by:

- First National Bank
- Suzuki

== Awards ==
The following players were rated best in the tournament:

| Award | Player | Team |
|---|---|---|
| FNB player of the tournament | Spumelele Shamase | UJ |
| Suzuki Golden Boot | Spumelele Shamase | UJ |
