= Nthabeleng Modiko =

South African soccer player and coach

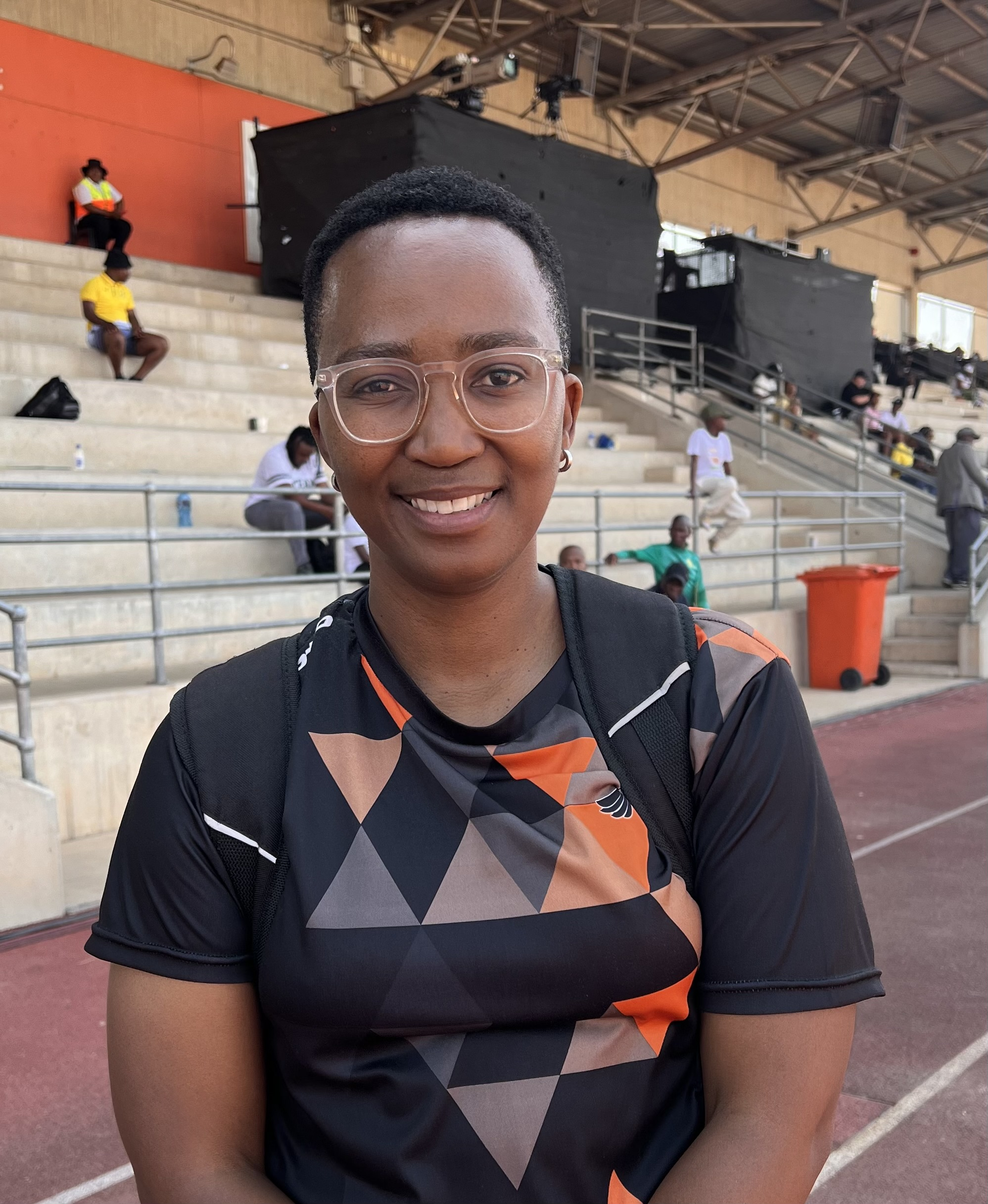
- Modiko at the UJ Soweto Stadium in 2024

Personal information
- Full name: Jacinta Rethabile Nthabeleng Modiko
- Date of birth: 20 July 1986 (age 40)
- Place of birth: Maokeng, Free State, South Africa
- Position: Defender

Team information
- Current team: University of Johannesburg (head coach)

Senior career*
Years	Team	Apps	(Gls)
2003–2006	University of the Free State		
2006–2007	Bloemfontein Celtics Ladies		
2008–	University of Johannesburg		

International career
–	South Africa	32	

Managerial career
- 2017–2021: University of the Witwatersrand
- 2022–: University of Johannesburg
- 2024: South Africa U/17
Medal record
Representing South Africa
Women's Africa Cup of Nations
Third place	2010 South Africa
- * Club domestic league appearances and goals

Jacinta Rethabile Nthabeleng Modiko (born 20 July 1986) is a South African professional soccer manager and former player who played as a defender. She is the current head coach of UJ Ladies and a former Banyana Banyana captain.

== Playing career ==
Modiko captained the South African women's national team at the 2010 African Women's Championship where they won a bronze medal. She participated in three Summer World University Games and earned 52 caps for the University Sports South Africa (USSA) women's football team. She previously played for Kovsie Ladies and Bloemfontein Celtics Ladies in the SAFA Provincial Women's League.

== Managerial career ==
In 2017, she was appointed the coach of the University of the Witwatersrand women's team Wits Ladies. She won the Johannesburg Women's Regional League in 2017 and 2018 and qualified the team to the second division in 2018. In 2019, she made her Gauteng Provincial Women's League debut with the team and guided them to a top five finish. She also lead the university to a third spot finish at the 2019 USSA finals and qualified them for the Women's Varsity Football for the first time. In her final season with the team, in 2021, she finished third in Gauteng Provincial Women's League.

In 2022, she was announced as the UJ Ladies team's assistant coach. In August 2022, she took over as head coach and guided UJ Ladies to four major titles: the Engen Knockout Challenge, Engen Champ of Champs, the FNB Women’s Varsity Football, and the USSA Football Championships. Her achievements also earned her several individual honours, including Coach of the Tournament awards at both the Engen Champ of Champs and the USSA Championships, as well as UJ Coach of the Year. Under her leadership, UJ Ladies improved from a ninth‑place finish in 2021 to fourth in the SAFA Women's League in the 2024 season. Beyond club football, Modiko, alongside Simphiwe Dludlu, led South Africa to a silver medal at the 2022 COSAFA Women’s Championship.She also took over the South Africa under-17 team as head coach for the second round qualifiers for the 2024 FIFA U-17 Women's World Cup qualifiers. The side lost 3–0 on aggregate to Ethiopia and exited the qualifiers.

Modiko won the 2026 Women's Varsity Football tournament undefeated with her team conceding a single goal throughout the tournament.

== Honours ==
=== Player ===
South Africa

- African Women's Championship: third place: 2010

=== Manager ===
University of the Witwatersrand

- University Sports South Africa (USSA): Third: 2019
- Johannesburg Women's Regional League: 2017, 2018

South Africa

- COSAFA Women's Championship runner up: 2022

University of Johannesburg

- Women's Varsity Football:2022, 2026; runners-up: 2023, 2025
- University Sports South Africa (USSA): 2022, 2025
- ENGEN Champ of Champs: 2022, 2023,
- Gauteng Engen Knockout Challenge: 2022, 2023; runners-Up: 2024
- Pirates Cup runners-up: 2023, 2025

Individual

- 2022 Engen Champ of Champs: Coach of the Tournament
- 2022 USSA: Coach of the Tournament
- 2022 University of Johannesburg: Coach of the Year
