= Women's Varsity Football =

Women's University Soccer Tournament

- Organiser(s): Varsity Sports
- Founded: 2013; 13 years ago
- Region: South Africa
- Teams: 8
- Current champions: University of Johannesburg (3rd title)
- Most championships: Tshwane University of Technology (6 titles)
- Broadcaster: SuperSport
- Website: varsitysportssa.com/football
- 2026

Women's Varsity Football, also known as Women's Varsity Diski, is a South African university football competition. It is one of seven sports in the Varsity Sports series. The annual tournament involves the top women's football playing universities in the country, which belong to the University Sports Company. The tournament is managed by Advent Sport Entertainment and Media (ASEM) on behalf of the University Sports Company (USC), and is endorsed by the South African Football Association and University Sport South Africa.

== History ==
The inaugural tournament was held in 2013, with UJ Ladies winning the final 6–0 against TUT Ladies.

The 2017 edition was hosted by Tshwane University of Technology at TUT Stadium. TUT Ladies defeated UJ Ladies 4–0 in the final to win their fourth consecutive title.

The 2018 edition was hosted by the North-West University at NWU McArthur Stadium. TUT Ladies defeated UWC Ladies 2–1 in the final to win their fifth consecutive title.

The 2019 edition was hosted by the North-West University at NWU-Mafikeng Stadium. TUT Ladies defeated UWC Ladies 4–1 in the final to win their sixth consecutive title.

The 2021 edition was hosted by the University of Pretoria at Tuks Stadium. UWC Ladies defeated UP-Tuks Ladies 4–3 via penalties after the matched ended in a goalless draw to win their maiden title.

The 2022 edition was hosted by the University of Johannesburg at the UJ Soweto Stadium. UJ Ladies defeated defending champions UWC Ladies 5–3 via penalties after the match ended in a goalless draw to win their second title.

The 2023 edition was hosted by Tshwane University of Technology at TUT Stadium. UWC Ladies were crowned champions after defeating defending champions UJ Ladies 2–0 in the final to win their second title.

The 2024 edition was hosted by Tshwane University of Technology at TUT Stadium from 26 July - 9 August 2024. UWC Ladies defended their title with a 2–1 win over hosts TUT Ladies in the final to win their third title.

The 2025 edition was hosted by the University of Johannesburg at the UJ Soweto Stadium. UWC Ladies defended their title with a 1–0 win over hosts UJ Ladies in the final to win their fourth title.

The 2026 edition was hosted by the University of Pretoria, University of the Witwatersrand, and the final played at the University of Johannesburg. UJ Ladies won their third title with a 5–0 win over UP-Tuks Ladies.

== Champions ==
The list of champions and runners-up:

Year	Champions	Runners-up
2013	UJ Ladies	TUT Ladies
2014	TUT Ladies	UP-Tuks Ladies
2015	TUT Ladies	UWC Ladies
2016	TUT Ladies	UWC Ladies
2017	TUT Ladies	UJ Ladies
2018	TUT Ladies	UWC Ladies
2019	TUT Ladies	UWC Ladies
2020	Cancelled due to the COVID-19 pandemic in South Africa	
2021	UWC Ladies	UP-Tuks Ladies
2022	UJ Ladies	UWC Ladies
2023	UWC Ladies	UJ Ladies
2024	UWC Ladies	TUT Ladies
2025	UWC Ladies	UJ Ladies
2026	UJ Ladies	UP-Tuks Ladies

== Most successful universities ==
Rank	University	Champions	Runners-up	Winning seasons	Runners-up seasons
1	Tshwane University of Technology	6	2	2014, 2015, 2016, 2017, 2018, 2019	2013, 2024
2	University of the Western Cape	4	5	2021, 2023, 2024, 2025	2015, 2016, 2018, 2019, 2022
3	University of Johannesburg	3	3	2013, 2022, 2026	2017, 2023, 2025
4	University of Pretoria	0	3		2014, 2021, 2026

== Notable players ==
Players from the universities who have since represented Banyana Banyana:

Team	Players
TUT Ladies	Refiloe Jane, Hildah Magaia, Tshogofatso Motlogelwa, Sibongile Ntoane
UJ Ladies	Sphumelele Shamase, Thubelihle Shamase, Amanda Dlamini, Nthabeleng Modiko, Karabo Makhurubetshi, Noko Matlou, Maphuti Manamela, Disebo Mametja, Presocious Matabologa, Ayesha Moosa, Matshidiso Masebe, Shannon Macomo, Yolando Nduli, Gugu Dhlamini, Dineo Magagula
UP-Tuks Ladies	Simphiwe Dludlu, Thalea Smidt, Wendy Shongwe, Ntando Phahla, Khutso Pila, Sinamile Mkhwanazi, Isabela Ludwig, Lebogang Mabatle
UFH Ladies	Nokuphila Mpatsiyana, Kesha Hendricks
UKZN Ladies	Kholosa Biyana
UWC Ladies	Regirl Ngobeni, Noxolo Cesane, Thembi Kgatlana, Bongeka Gamede, Amogelang Motau, Sibulele Holweni, Chelsea Daniels, Ronnel Donnelly, Lonathemba Mhlongo, Fikile Magama, Leandra Smeda, Jermaine Seoposenwe, Kaylin Swart
Wits Ladies	Lesego Nkoane

== Sponsors ==
The tournament is sponsored by:

- First National Bank
- Suzuki
- Cashbuild
- SportPesa

== Broadcasting and official partners ==
SuperSport is the official broadcaster. Southern Sun is the accommodation partner. Red Bull is the official energy drink. LIFT is the official airline. Gilbert is the official ball partner.
