= Shannon Macomo =

South African soccer player (born 2004)

Personal information
- Full name: Shannon Hayley Macomo
- Date of birth: 28 April 2004 (age 22)
- Place of birth: Gqeberha, Eastern Cape, South Africa
- Position: Defender

College career
Years	Team	Apps	(Gls)
2023–2025	University of Johannesburg	66	(9)

International career
2020	South Africa U/17		
2021–2023	South Africa U/20		
2024–	South Africa	1	

Shannon Hayley Macomo (born 28 April 2004) is a South African soccer player who plays as a defender for SAFA Women's League club the University of Johannesburg and the South Africa women's national team.

== College career ==
Macomo played for the University of Johannesburg from 2023 till 2025. She appeared 66 times and scored 9 goals for the Orange Army. Her side were runners-up at the inaugural Pirates Cup following a 2–1 defeat to the University of Pretoria in March 2023.

She was part of the side that won the Gauteng Engen Knockout Challenge title in July 2023 winning 1–0 against JVW Sapphires. She won the defender of the tournament at the 2024 Gauteng Engen Knockout Challenge when her side finished as runners-ups to Mamelodi Sundowns.

They were runners-up at the 2023 Women's Varsity Football losing 2–0 in the final to the University of the Western Cape. She scored a brace in a 4–0 win against Central University of Technology, Free State at the 2024 Women's Varsity Football. She scored the third goal in a 3–0 semi-final win against the Tshwane University of Technology in the 2025 Women's Varsity Football tournament where her team finished as runners-ups to the University of the Western Cape.

== International career ==
Macomo competed for the South Africa women's U-17 for the world cup qualifiers in 2020. She also competed for the U-20 team in 2021.

In 2024 she got her first international call up for the senior women's team and made her debut at the 2024 COSAFA Women's Championship in a 1–0 win against Namibia on 22 October 2024. The side were runners-up to Zambia.

== Personal life ==
She earned an Honours degree in Human Resource Management from the University of Johannesburg.

== Honours ==
South Africa

- COSAFA Women's Championship runners-up: 2024

University of Johannesburg

- Women's Varsity Football runners-up: 2023, 2025
- Gauteng Engen Knockout Challenge: 2023, runners-up: 2024
- Pirates Cup: runners-up: 2023

Individual

- 2024 Gauteng Engen Knockout Challenge: Defender of the Tournament
