= 2026 Women's Varsity Football =

Tournament details
- Country: South Africa
- City: Braamfontein
- Venue: Wits Stadium
- Date: 1 - 19 August 2026
- Teams: 8

Final positions
- Champions: University of Johannesburg (3rd title)
- Runners-up: University of Pretoria
- Semifinalists: University of the Western Cape; Tshwane University of Technology

Tournament statistics
- Top goal scorer(s): Lindelwa Mabuza (4 goals)

Awards
- Best player: Sibongile Ntoane

Official website
- https://www.varsitysportssa.com/football-women-fixtures

The 2026 Women's Varsity Football was the thirteenth edition of the South African women's university soccer competition. It involved some of the top football playing universities in the country. The tournament is run by Varsity Sports SA, and is endorsed by the South African Football Association and University Sport South Africa. It was hosted at Wits Stadium by University of the Witwatersrand.

UWC were defending champions. They were defeated 1–0 in the semifinal by UJ who went on to win their third title after defeating UP Tuks 5–0 in the final.

== Participating teams ==
The eight teams that competed in the 2026 Women's Varsity Football challenge were:

Team name	University
UJ	University of Johannesburg
UWC	University of the Western Cape
UP-Tuks	University of Pretoria
CPUT	Cape Peninsula University of Technology
UL	University of Limpopo
TUT	Tshwane University of Technology
Wits	University of the Witwatersrand
WSU	Walter Sisulu University

The teams were split into two groups as follows:

Group A	Group B
UJ; UL; UWC; Wits	UP-Tuks; TUT; WSU; CPUT

== Round robin stage ==
Pos	Team	Pld	W	D	L	GF	GA	GD	Pts	
1	UJ	3	3	0	0	0	0	0	9	Advance to Semi-Finals
2	UWC	6	4	1	1	4	6	−2	13	Advance to Semi-Finals
3	Wits	4	1	1	2	4	6	−2	4	
4	UL	4	0	1	3	2	15	−13	1	

Pos	Team	Pld	W	D	L	GF	GA	GD	Pts	
1	UP-Tuks	4	2	1	1	5	5	0	7	Advance to Semi-Finals
2	TUT	4	2	0	2	13	4	+9	6	Advance to Semi-Finals
3	WSU	4	1	2	1	3	6	−3	5	
4	CPUT	4	0	2	2	2	9	−7	2	

1 August
15:00 CAT UTC+02:00

WSU	1–1	Wits

Wits Stadium
1 August
15:00 CAT UTC+02:00

UL	0–0	CPUT

Wits Stadium
1 August
17:30 CAT UTC+02:00

TUT	0–1	UJ

Wits Stadium
1 August
19:30 CAT UTC+02:00

UP-Tuks	0–0	UWC

Wits Stadium
2 August
13:00 CAT UTC+02:00

TUT	1–11	CPUT

Wits Stadium
2 August
15:00 CAT UTC+02:00

UJ	3–0	UP-Tuks

Wits Stadium
2 August
17:00 CAT UTC+02:00

Wits	2–1	UL

Wits Stadium
2 August
19:00 CAT UTC+02:00

UWC	1–1	WSU

Wits Stadium
8 August
13:00 CAT UTC+02:00

UWC	6–0	UL

Wits Stadium
8 August
15:00 CAT UTC+02:00

UJ	4–0	WSU

Wits Stadium
8 August
17:30 CAT UTC+02:00

CPUT	1–3	UP-Tuks

Wits Stadium
8 August
19:30 CAT UTC+02:00

Wits	0–2	TUT

Wits Stadium
9 August
13:00 CAT UTC+02:00

UP-Tuks	2–1	Wits

Wits Stadium
9 August
15:00 CAT UTC+02:00

WSU	1–0	CPUT

Wits Stadium
9 August
17:30 CAT UTC+02:00

UJ	1–1	UL

Wits Stadium
9 August
19:30 CAT UTC+02:00

TUT	0–2	UWC

Wits Stadium

== Knockout stages ==
- In the knockout stage, extra-time and a penalty shoot-out will be used to decide the winner if necessary.

=== Bracket ===
Semi-finals
10 August – Wits Stadium
UWC	0
UJ	1
10 August – Wits Stadium
UP-Tuks(p)	1(6)
TUT	1(5)

Final
19 August– UJ Soweto Stadium
UJ	5
UP-Tuks	0

=== 7th-place match ===
10 August
13:00 CAT UTC+02:00

Wits	1–0	CPUT

Wits Stadium

=== 5th-place match ===
10 August
15:00 CAT UTC+02:00

WSU	2–1	UL

Wits Stadium

=== Semi-finals ===
10 August
17:00 CAT UTC+02:00

UJ	1–0	UWC

Wits Stadium
10 August
19:00 CAT UTC+02:00

UP-Tuks	1–1	TUT
Penalties
	6-5

Wits Stadium

=== Final ===
19 August
19:00 CAT UTC+02:00

UJ	5–0	UP-Tuks
Mpho Dlamini; Lindelwa Mabuza X2; Kabelo Mokoena; Sbongakonke Mzobe

UJ Soweto Stadium

== Awards ==
The following players were rated best in the tournament:

Award	Player	Team
FNB player of the tournament	Sibongile Ntoane	TUT
Suzuki Golden Boot	Lindelwa Mabuza	UJ

== Sponsors ==
The tournament was sponsored by:

- First National Bank
- Suzuki
- SportPesa
