= Andisiwe Mgcoyi =

South African soccer player and coach

Personal information
- Date of birth: 16 June 1988 (age 38)
- Place of birth: Johannesburg, South Africa
- Position: Forward

Team information
- Current team: University of Johannesburg (assistant coach)

Senior career*
Years	Team	Apps	(Gls)
–	Red Eagles		
–	Cape Town Roses		
2012	Mamelodi Sundowns		
2013–2015	Nové Zámky	10	(13)
2015–2016	Dorogi Diófa		
2016–2017	Mamelodi Sundowns		
2017	→ 1. FC Saarbrücken (loan)		
2019–2020	KF Apolonia Fier	8	(17)
2020–2025	Mamelodi Sundowns		

International career
2010–2025	South Africa	42	(16)

Managerial career
- 2022–2025: Mamelodi Sundowns Ladies Academy
- 2026–: ESCA
- 2026–: University of Johannesburg (assistant coach)
- * Club domestic league appearances and goals

Andisiwe “Gudluza” Mgcoyi (born 16 June 1988) is a former South African soccer player who played as a forward. She is the current attacking coach at ESCA and assistant coach for UJ Ladies.

She represented the South African women's national soccer team at the 2012 London Olympics.

== Playing career ==
Mgcoyi played for Mamelodi Sundowns in the Sasol League in 2012.

=== Nové Zámky ===
In 2013, she joined Slovak Women's First League side Nové Zámky during the 2012/2013 season and immediately became an overnight sensation, scoring 13 goals in 10 matches to finish as the club's second top goal scorer and also helping the club win their first Slovak Women's First League title.

She also represented her club in the UEFA Women's Champions League qualifying round and as of 12 August 2013 she had 1 goal in 3 matches.

After leaving Nové Zámky, Mgcoyi had a spell with Hungarian team Dorogi Diófa, a return to Mamelodi Sundowns, and a loan to German side 1. FC Saarbrücken.

=== KF Apolonia ===
In 2019, she played for Albanian Women's National Championship side KF Apolonia Fier during the 2019/20 season when the side finished second in their league. Mgcoyi netted 17 goals in 8 appearances for the club.

=== Mamelodi Sundowns Ladies ===
In 2020, she joined SAFA Women's League side Mamelodi Sundowns and was part of the team that won the 2021 COSAFA Women's Champions League, the 2021 CAF Women's Champions League, and the 2021 SAFA Women's League in 2021.

She was the joint top goal scorer for the 2021 SAFA Women's League with 27 goals.

Sundowns were runner's up for the 2022 COSAFA Women's Champions League and the 2022 CAF Women's Champions League in 2022. They won the 2022 SAFA Women's League title.

The club won the 2023 COSAFA Women's Champions League, the 2023 CAF Women's Champions League, and the 2023 SAFA Women's League in 2023.

=== International career ===
Mgcoyi was also instrumental in South Africa's quest to win the 2012 African Women's Championship after finishing runners up in 2006 and 2008. She was the spearhead of the team as she scored a hat trick against DR Congo winning 4–1 but the team lost to Equatorial Guinea in the final. She ended her career having appeared 42 times for the senior national team scoring 16 goals.

== International goals ==
No.	Date	Venue	Opponent	Score	Result	Competition
1.	31 October 2012	Estadio de Malabo, Malabo, Equatorial Guinea	Senegal	1–0	1–0	2012 African Women's Championship
2.	3 November 2012	Nkoantoma Stadium, Bata, Equatorial Guinea	DR Congo	2–0	4–1	2012 African Women's Championship
3.	3 November 2012	Nkoantoma Stadium, Bata, Equatorial Guinea	DR Congo	3–0	4–1	2012 African Women's Championship
4.	3 November 2012	Nkoantoma Stadium, Bata, Equatorial Guinea	DR Congo	4–0	4–1	2012 African Women's Championship
5.	25 November 2016	Stade Municipal de Limbe, Limbe, Cameroon	Egypt	1–0	5–0	2016 Women's Africa Cup of Nations

== Managerial career ==
She is the current coach of the Mamelodi Sundowns Ladies U/16 side. In the inaugural Gauteng Women's Development League her side won the league undefeated. In July 2024 she was named the coach of the tournament at the Engen Knockout Challenge after her side won their maiden title. They won the Engen Champ of Champs in 2024 and was named the overall coach of the tournament.

=== University of Johannesburg ===
After Mgcoyi secured a CAF B coaching license she joined the University of Johannesburg as their Sasol League head coach and second assistant in Nthabeleng Modiko's first team.

== Honours ==
Player

Nové Zámky

- Slovak Women's First League: 2012/13

KF Apolonia

- Albanian Women's National Championship runners-up: 2019/20

Mamelodi Sundowns Ladies

- CAF Women's Champions League: 2021, 2023, runners-up: 2022
- COSAFA Women's Champions League: 2021, 2023, runners-up: 2022
- SAFA Women's League: 2020, 2021, 2022, 2023, 2024

Manager

Mamelodi Sundowns Ladies Academy

- Gauteng Women's Development League: 2023, 2024
- Engen Champ of Champs: 2024
- Engen Knockout Challenge: 2024

University of Johannesburg (assistant coach)

- Women's Varsity Football: 2026

Individual

- 2015 Sasol League National Championship: Top Scorer
- 2021 SAFA Women's League: Top Scorer
- 2023 COSAFA Women's Champions League: Top Scorer
- 2024 Engen Champ of Champs: Coach of the Tournament
- 2024 Engen Knockout Challenge: Coach of the Tournament
