= 2024 Women's Varsity Football =

Tournament details
- Country: South Africa
- City: Pretoria
- Venue: TUT Stadium
- Date: 26 July 2024 -9 August 2024
- Teams: 8

Final positions
- Champions: University of the Western Cape
- Runners-up: Tshwane University of Technology
- Semifinalists: University of Johannesburg; North-West University

Tournament statistics
- Top goal scorer(s): Ronnel Donnelly (5 goals)

Awards
- Best player: Ronnel Donnelly
- Best goalkeeper: Thandeka Ngcobo

Official website
- https://www.varsitysportssa.com/football-women-fixtures
- All statistics correct as of 10 August 2024.

The 2024 Women's Varsity Football was the eleventh edition of the South African women's university soccer competition. It involved some of the top football playing universities in the country. The tournament is run by Varsity Sports SA, and is endorsed by the South African Football Association and University Sport South Africa. It was hosted at TUT Stadium by Tshwane University of Technology .

UWC were defending champions. The Cape Peninsula University of Technology made their debut. UWC defended their title with a 2-1 over TUT in the final.

== Participating teams ==
The eight teams that will compete in the 2024 Women's Varsity Football challenge are:

| Team name | University |
|---|---|
| UJ | University of Johannesburg |
| UWC | University of the Western Cape |
| UP-Tuks | University of Pretoria |
| CPUT | Cape Peninsula University of Technology |
| CUT | Central University of Technology, Free State |
| TUT | Tshwane University of Technology |
| Wits | University of the Witwatersrand |
| NWU Potchefstroom | North-West University |

The teams were split into two groups as follows:

| Group A | Group B |
|---|---|
| UP-Tuks; TUT; NWU; Wits | CPUT; CUT; UJ; UWC |

== Round robin stage ==
=== Group A ===
| Pos | Team | Pld | W | D | L | GF | GA | GD | Pts | |
|---|---|---|---|---|---|---|---|---|---|---|
| 1 | NWU | 3 | 3 | 0 | 0 | 6 | 2 | +4 | 9 | Advance to Semi-Finals |
| 2 | TUT (H) | 3 | 2 | 0 | 1 | 9 | 3 | +6 | 6 | Advance to Semi-Finals |
| 3 | UP-Tuks | 3 | 1 | 0 | 2 | 4 | 3 | +1 | 3 | |
| 4 | Wits | 3 | 0 | 0 | 3 | 1 | 12 | −11 | 0 | |

(H) Hosts
26 July
12:00 CAT UTC+02:00

| NWU | 3–1 | Wits |
|---|---|---|
| 1' Zanile Khoza 31' Pholoso Molokwe Rebaone Mojahi | | 45' Imaan Parker |

TUT Stadium
26 July
19:00 CAT UTC+02:00

| TUT | 2–1 | UP-Tuks |
|---|---|---|
| Tshogofatso Motlogelwa x2 | | Thembelihle Masibi |

TUT Stadium
27 July
15:00 CAT UTC+02:00

| TUT | 1–2 | NWU |
|---|---|---|
| Sibongile Ntoane | | Mpho Molwele; Rebaone Mojahi |

TUT Stadium
27 July
19:00 CAT UTC+02:00

| Wits | 0–3 | UP-Tuks |
|---|---|---|
| | | S’Bahle Ndlovu Magogodi Litlhakanyane (OG) Ibanathi Msindo |

TUT Stadium
28 July
13:00 CAT UTC+02:00

| UP-Tuks | 0–1 | NWU |
|---|---|---|
| | | 55' Zanile Khoza |

TUT Stadium
28 July
19:00 CAT UTC+02:00

| TUT | 6–0 | Wits |
|---|---|---|
| 12' 30' Sibongile Ntoane x2 Tshogofatso Motlogelwa; Gift Makanya; Naledi Thakanyane Orapeleng Ndlovu |

TUT Stadium

=== Group B ===
| Pos | Team | Pld | W | D | L | GF | GA | GD | Pts | |
|---|---|---|---|---|---|---|---|---|---|---|
| 1 | UJ | 3 | 3 | 0 | 0 | 9 | 0 | +9 | 9 | Advance to Semi-Finals |
| 2 | UWC | 3 | 2 | 0 | 1 | 8 | 2 | +6 | 6 | Advance to Semi-Finals |
| 3 | CUT | 3 | 1 | 0 | 2 | 2 | 10 | −8 | 3 | |
| 4 | CPUT | 3 | 0 | 0 | 3 | 0 | 7 | −7 | 0 | |

26 July
12:00 CAT UTC+02:00

| CUT | 0–1 | CPUT |
|---|---|---|
| | | 58' Maleqhwa Mokoena |

TUT Stadium
26 July
17:00 CAT UTC+02:00

| UJ | 1–0 | UWC |
|---|---|---|
| Patience Sekhukhuni |

TUT Stadium
27 July
13:00 CAT UTC+02:00

| UJ | 4–0 | CPUT |
|---|---|---|
| Bryden Mokobi x2 Refilwe Maseko Thato Mofolo |

TUT Stadium
27 July
17:00 CAT UTC+02:00

| CUT | 1–6 | UWC |
|---|---|---|
| Keneilwe Nqai | | Ronnel Donnelly x2 Chelsea Daniels x3 Thembelihle Zulu |

TUT Stadium
28 July
15:00 CAT UTC+02:00

| CPUT | 0–2 | UWC |
|---|---|---|
| | | Ronnel Donnelly; Aakifah Adams |

TUT Stadium
28 July
17:00 CAT UTC+02:00

| UJ | 4–0 | CUT |
|---|---|---|
| Sbongakonke Mzobe Sphokazi Ngwenya Shannon Macomo x2 |

TUT Stadium

== Knockout stages ==
- In the knockout stage, extra-time and a penalty shoot-out will be used to decide the winner if necessary.

=== Bracket ===
Semi-finals
29 July – TUT Stadium
NWU | 0
UWC | 5
29 July – TUT Stadium
TUT(p) | 1(4)
UJ | 1(2)

Final
9 August – TUT Stadium
TUT | 1
UWC | 2

=== 7th-place match ===
29 July
13:00 CAT UTC+02:00

| CPUT | 1–2 | Wits |

TUT Stadium

=== 5th-place match ===
29 July
15:00 CAT UTC+02:00

| CUT | 0–6 | UP |

TUT Stadium

=== Semi-finals ===
29 July
17:00 CAT UTC+02:00

| NWU | 0–5 | UWC |
|---|---|---|
| | | 36' Gamede 37' Ronnel Donnelly; 50' Chelsea Daniels; Aakifah Adams Own Goal |

TUT Stadium

29 July
19:00 CAT UTC+02:00

| TUT | 1–1 | UJ |
|---|---|---|
| 55' Tshogofatso Motlogelwa | | 57' Thato Mofolo |
Penalties
| | 4-2 |

TUT Stadium

=== Final ===
9 August
19:30 CAT UTC+02:00

| TUT | 1–2 | UWC |
|---|---|---|
| 19' Tshogofatso Motlogelwa | | 9' Ronnel Donnelly; 44' Tiffany Kortjie |

TUT Stadium

== Sponsors ==
The tournament was sponsored by:

- First National Bank
- Suzuki
- Cashbuild

== Awards ==
The following players were rated best in the tournament:

| Award | Player | Team |
|---|---|---|
| FNB player of the tournament | Ronnel Donnelly | UWC |
| Suzuki Golden Boot | Ronnel Donnelly | UWC |
| Cashbuild Golden Glove | Thandeka Ngcobo | UWC |
