= 2025 Women's Varsity Football =

Tournament details
- Country: South Africa
- City: Soweto
- Venue: UJ Soweto Stadium
- Date: 5 - 19 September 2025
- Teams: 8

Final positions
- Champions: University of the Western Cape (4th title)
- Runners-up: University of Johannesburg
- Semifinalists: University of the Witwatersrand; Tshwane University of Technology

Tournament statistics
- Top goal scorer(s): Thato Mofolo (6 goals)

Awards
- Best player: Thabiso Senyatsi
- Best goalkeeper: Manana Myeki

Official website
- https://www.varsitysportssa.com/football-women-fixtures

The 2025 Women's Varsity Football was the twelfth edition of the South African women's university soccer competition. It involved some of the top football playing universities in the country. The tournament is run by Varsity Sports SA, and is endorsed by the South African Football Association and University Sport South Africa. It was hosted at UJ Soweto Stadium by University of Johannesburg .

UWC were defending champions. The University of Venda made their debut.

== Participating teams ==
The eight teams that competed in the 2025 Women's Varsity Football challenge were:

Team name	University
UJ	University of Johannesburg
UWC	University of the Western Cape
UP-Tuks	University of Pretoria
CPUT	Cape Peninsula University of Technology
Univen	University of Venda
TUT	Tshwane University of Technology
Wits	University of the Witwatersrand
NWU Mafikeng	North-West University

The teams were split into two groups as follows:

Group A	Group B
UP-Tuks; TUT; UWC; Univen	CPUT; NWU; UJ; Wits

== Round robin stage ==
=== Group A ===
Pos	Team	Pld	W	D	L	GF	GA	GD	Pts	
1	UWC	3	3	0	0	14	1	+13	9	Advance to Semi-Finals
2	TUT	3	1	1	1	10	3	+7	4	Advance to Semi-Finals
3	UP-Tuks	3	1	1	1	6	4	+2	4	
4	Univen	3	0	0	3	1	23	−22	0	

5 September
15:00 CAT UTC+02:00

UP-Tuks	5–1	Univen
		Andani Dabana

UJ Soweto Stadium
5 September
19:00 CAT UTC+02:00

TUT	1–2	UWC
		Chelsea Daniels; Zikhona Nogqala

UJ Soweto Stadium
6 September
15:00 CAT UTC+02:00

TUT	1–1	UP-Tuks

UJ Soweto Stadium
6 September
17:00 CAT UTC+02:00

UWC	10–0	Uinven
Tiffany Kortjie x3; Chelsea Daniels x2; Faith Maswanganyi; Akholiwe Matsotsi x2; Lihle Zulu; Mmabatho Mogale

UJ Soweto Stadium
7 September
13:00 CAT UTC+02:00

UP-Tuks	0–2	UWC
		Chelsea Daniels; Mmabatho Mogale

UJ Soweto Stadium
28 July
19:00 CAT UTC+02:00

Univen	0–8	TUT
		Naledi Thakanyane

UJ Soweto Stadium

=== Group B ===
Pos	Team	Pld	W	D	L	GF	GA	GD	Pts	
1	UJ (H)	3	3	0	0	10	0	+10	9	Advance to Semi-Finals
2	Wits	3	1	1	1	3	4	−1	4	Advance to Semi-Finals
3	NWU	3	1	1	1	4	7	−3	4	
4	CPUT	3	0	0	3	1	7	−6	0	

(H) Hosts
5 September
13:00 CAT UTC+02:00

Wits	1–0	CPUT
Ayanda Mnyembane

UJ Soweto Stadium
5 September
17:00 CAT UTC+02:00

UJ	4–0	NWU
Thato Mofolo X3

UJ Soweto Stadium
6 September
13:00 CAT UTC+02:00

NWU	2–1	CPUT
Nontobeko Gumede		Mosetsanagape Leepile

UJ Soweto Stadium
6 September
19:00 CAT UTC+02:00

UJ	2–0	Wits
Gugu Dhlamini

UJ Soweto Stadium
7 September
15:00 CAT UTC+02:00

UJ	4–0	CPUT
Adivhaho Mphangale x2

UJ Soweto Stadium
7 September
17:00 CAT UTC+02:00

NWU	2–2	Wits

UJ Soweto Stadium

== Knockout stages ==
- In the knockout stage, extra-time and a penalty shoot-out will be used to decide the winner if necessary.

=== Bracket ===
Semi-finals
8 September – UJ Soweto Stadium
UWC	1
Wits	0
8 September – UJ Soweto Stadium
UJ	3
TUT	0

Final
19 September – UJ Soweto Stadium
UWC	1
UJ	0

=== 7th-place match ===
8 September
13:00 CAT UTC+02:00

Univen	0–4	CPUT
		Zilungile Mathiya x2

UJ Soweto Stadium

=== 5th-place match ===
8 September
15:00 CAT UTC+02:00

Tuks	2–1	NWU
Wendy Shongwe; Mmakhgotso Mashishi

UJ Soweto Stadium

=== Semi-finals ===
8 September
17:00 CAT UTC+02:00

UWC	1–0	Wits
Thembelihle Zulu

UJ Soweto Stadium
8 September
19:00 CAT UTC+02:00

UJ	3–0	TUT
Thato Mofolo; Sthembile Msomi; Shannon Macomo

UJ Soweto Stadium

=== Final ===
19 September
19:00 CAT UTC+02:00

UWC	1–0	UJ
Tiffany Kortjie

UJ Soweto Stadium

== Awards ==
The following players were rated best in the tournament:

Award	Player	Team
FNB player of the tournament	Thabiso Senyatsi	TUT
Suzuki Golden Boot	Thato Mofolo	UJ
Cashbuild Golden Glove	Manana Myeki	UJ

== Sponsors ==
The tournament was sponsored by:

- First National Bank
- Suzuki
- Cashbuild
- SportPesa
