= Gugu Dhlamini =

South Africa soccer player

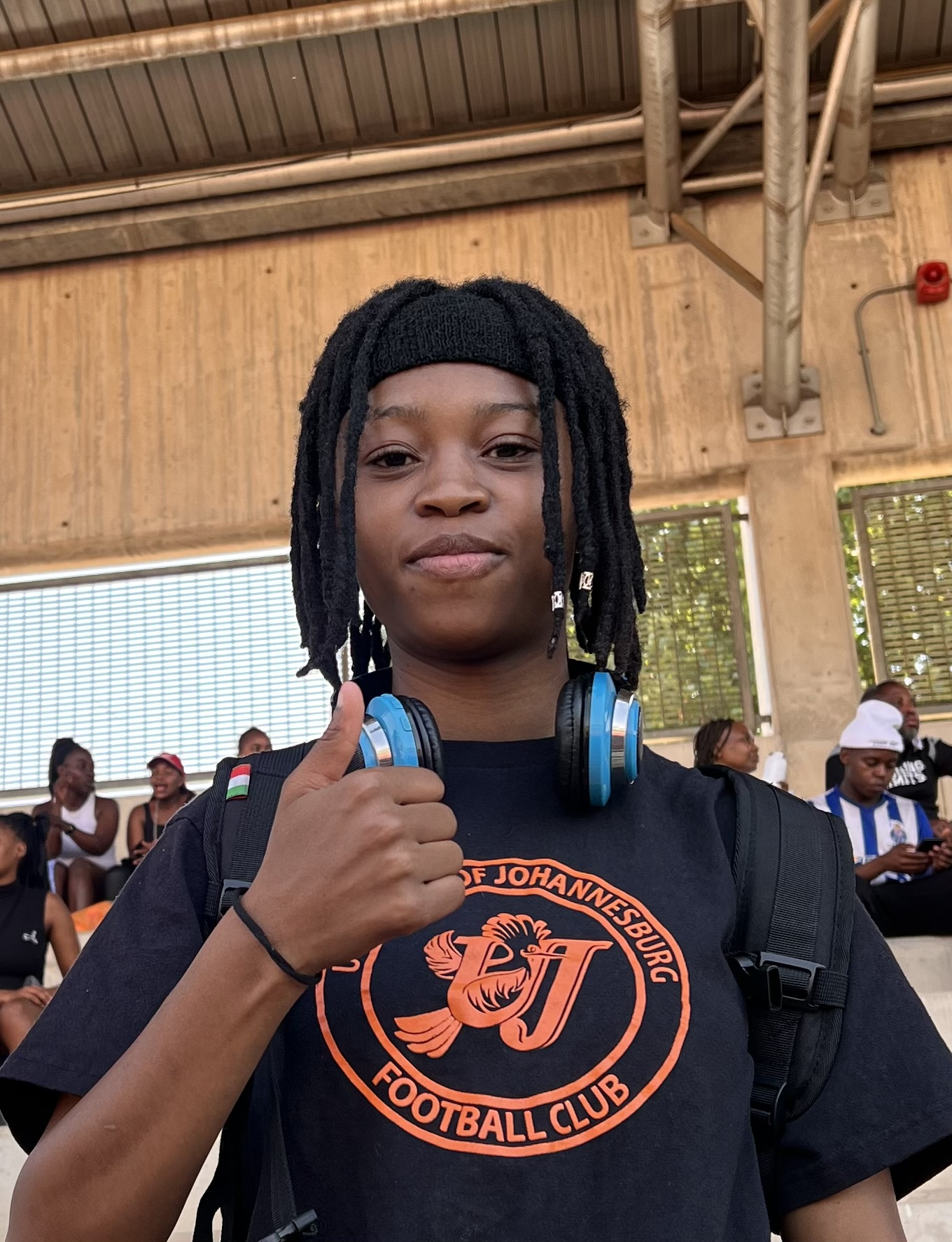
- Dhlamini at the UJ Soweto Stadium in 2024

Personal information
- Full name: Gugu Angel Dhlamini
- Date of birth: 9 September 2005 (age 21)
- Place of birth: Daveyton, Gauteng, South Africa
- Position: Forward

Team information
- Current team: Mamelodi Sundowns Ladies

College career
Years	Team	Apps	(Gls)
2023	University of Pretoria		
2024–2025	University of Johannesburg	49	(12)

Senior career*
Years	Team	Apps	(Gls)
2026–	Mamelodi Sundowns Ladies		

International career
2024–	South Africa	2	
- * Club domestic league appearances and goals

Gugu Angel Dhlamini (born 9 September 2005) is a South African soccer player who plays as a forward for SAFA Women's League club Mamelodi Sundowns Ladies and the South Africa women's national team.

== College career ==
=== UP-Tuks Ladies ===
She was part of the team that were runners-up at the 2022 Sasol League National Championship. She scored in the sides opening 3–0 win against NWU Tawana. She also scored the equalising goal in the semi-final against Lindelani Ladies. The match ended in a 1–1 draw and UP-Tuks Ladies won 4–2 in the penalty shootout that sent them to the finals and secured them promotion to the SAFA Women's League.

Dhlamini scored the winner in a 2–1 win over UJ Ladies in the Pirates Cup to be crowned champions of the inaugural U/21 women's tournament hosted by Orlando Pirates.

=== UJ Ladies ===
In March 2024 she was unveiled as one of eight new singings by SAFA Women's League side UJ Ladies.

She made her debut on 3 March 2024 when she came on as a substitution, she scored on debut helping the team to a 4–1 win in their first game of the season against First Touch. On 10 March 2024, she scored in the third minute in a 3–1 home win against JVW. On 24 March 2024, she scored in the ninth minute to open the scoring in a 4–1 away game win against TS Galaxy Queens. On 30 March 2024, she scored in the 64th minute in a 3–2 home win over City Lads.

She part of the team that lost out to Mamelodi Sundowns Ladies Academy 4-3 via penalties in the final of the ENGEN Knockout Challenge after the match ended in a 0-0 draw. Dlamini was named striker of the tournament.

In 2025 the team won the ENGEN Knockout Challenge and the ENGEN Champ of Champs with Dlamini named the striker of the tournament for the Knockout Challenge.

Dlamini was nominated for the player of the tournament at the 2025 Women's Varsity Football.

=== Mamelodi Sundowns ===
She joined Mamelodi Sundowns in February 2026.

== Honours ==
- Sasol League National Championship runners-up: 2022
- Pirates Cup: 2023
- ENGEN Champ of Champs: 2025
- ENGEN Knockout Challenge: 2025, runners-up: 2024

Individual

- 2024 ENGEN Knockout Challenge Striker of the Tournament
- 2025 ENGEN Knockout Challenge Striker of the Tournament
