= Tshogofatso Motlogelwa =

South African soccer player

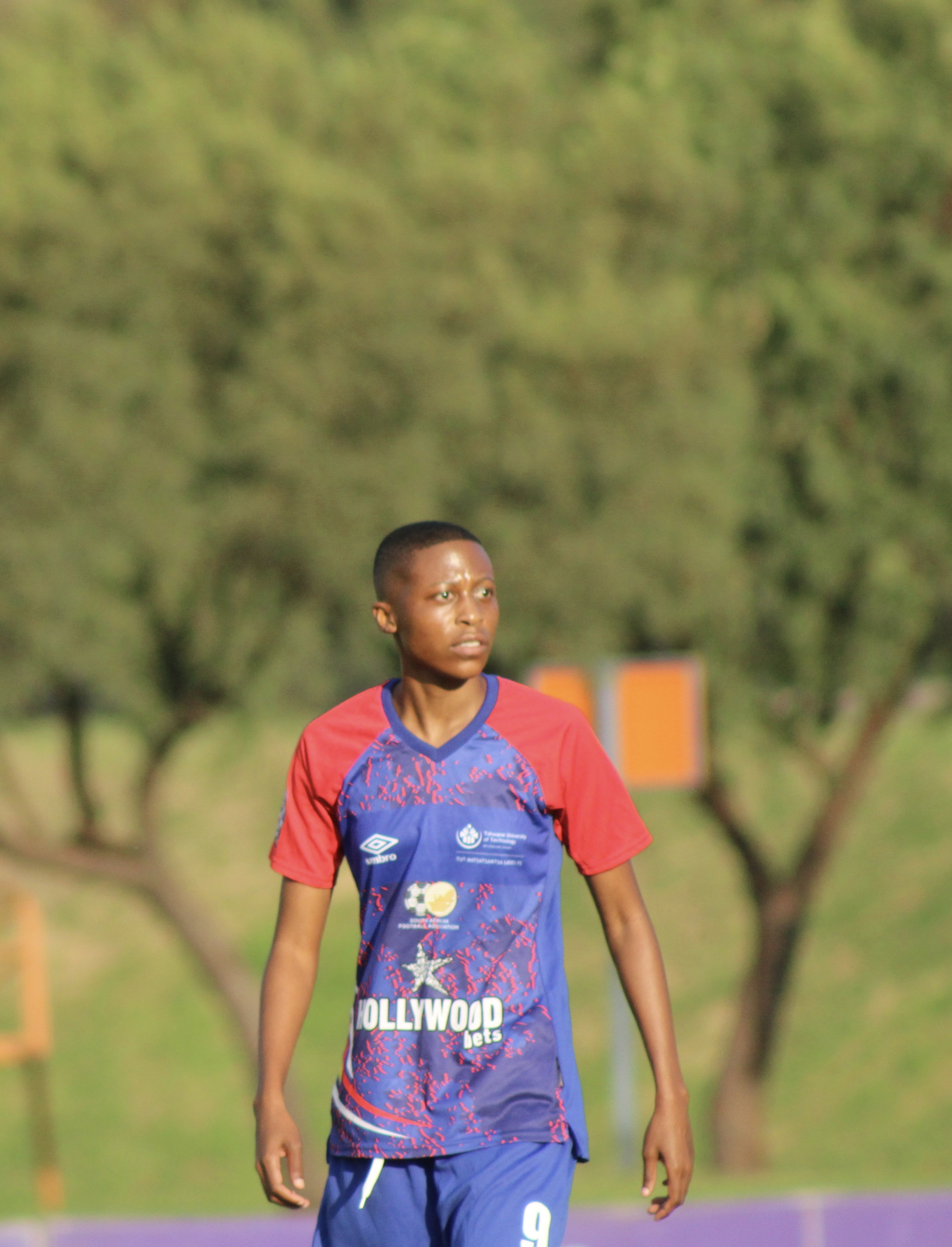
- Motlogelwa in 2025

Personal information
- Full name: Tshogofatso Akhila Motlogelwa
- Date of birth: 29 April 2000 (age 26)
- Position: Midfielder

Team information
- Current team: TUT Matsatsantsa Ladies
- Number: 9

College career
| Years | Team | Apps | (Gls) |
| 2021- | TUT Matsatsantsa Ladies | | |

International career
| 2023- | South Africa | | (3) |

Tshogofatso Akhila Motlogelwa (born 29 April 2000) is a South African soccer player who plays as a midfielder for SAFA Women's League club TUT Matsatsantsa Ladies and the South Africa women's national team.

== College career ==
=== Tshwane University of Technology ===
Motlogelwa captained TUT Matsatsantsa Ladies in the 2024 Women's Varsity Football. She netted a brace in a 2-1 win over Tuks Ladies in their first group stage match. She also scored in a 6-0 win over Wits Ladies to help her team to a second place finish in group A. In the semi-finals she scored a goal to help her team to a 1-1 draw against UJ Ladies where they won 4-2 via penalties. In the final against UWC Ladies she scored the only goal for her team in a 2-1 loss to finish as runners-ups. This was university's first final since 2019.

She currently has 7 goals scored in 24 appearances in the 2024 SAFA Women's League.

== International career ==
Motlogelwa competed for the senior women's national team at the 2023 COSAFA Women's Championship. At 2024 COSAFA Women's Championship she scored the winning goal in a 1-0 win against Namibia.

=== International goals ===
| No. | Date | Venue | Opponent | Score | Result | Competition |
|---|---|---|---|---|---|---|
| 1. | 22 October 2024 | Nelson Mandela Bay Stadium, Gqeberha, South Africa | Namibia | 1–0 | 1–0 | 2024 COSAFA Women's Championship |
| 2. | 28 October 2024 | Madibaz Stadium, Gqeberha, South Africa | Seychelles | 4–0 | 8–1 | 2024 COSAFA Women's Championship |
| 3. | 31 October 2024 | Wolfson Stadium, Ibhayi, South Africa | Mozambique | 1–1 | 1–1 | 2024 COSAFA Women's Championship |

== Honours ==
- Women's Varsity Football: runners-up: 2024
