= 2023 Women's Varsity Football =

10th Women's Varsity Football

Tournament details
- Country: South Africa
- City: Pretoria
- Venue: TUT Stadium
- Dates: 11 August 2023 - 19 August 2023
- Teams: 8

Final positions
- Champions: University of the Western Cape
- Runners-up: University of Johannesburg
- Semifinalists: University of the Witwatersrand; University of Pretoria

Tournament statistics
- Matches played: 17
- Goals scored: 53 (3.12 per match)
- Top goal scorer(s): Lusanda Mavundla (5 goals)

Awards
- Best player: Lusanda Mavundla
- Best goalkeeper: Matshidiso Masebe; Siphesihle Dlamini
- All statistics correct as of 19 July 2024.

The 2023 Women's Varsity Football was the tenth edition of the South African women's university soccer competition. It involved some of the top football playing universities in the country. The tournament is run by Varsity Sports SA, and is endorsed by the South African Football Association and University Sport South Africa. It was hosted at TUT Stadium by Tshwane University of Technology.

The University of Johannesburg were defending champions. They lost the title 2-0 in the final against the University of the Western Cape. The University of Fort Hare made their debut.

== Participating teams ==
The eight teams that competed in the 2023 Women's Varsity Football challenge are:

Team name	University
UJ	University of Johannesburg
UWC	University of the Western Cape
UP-Tuks	University of Pretoria
DUT	Durban University of Technology
UFH	University of Fort Hare
TUT	Tshwane University of Technology
Wits	University of the Witwatersrand
UKZN	University of KwaZulu-Natal

The teams were split into two groups as follows:

Group A	Group B
UFH; UKZN; UP-Tuks; Wits	DUT; TUT; UJ; UWC

== Round robin stage ==
The 2023 season began with round robin stages on the 11th of August 2023.

- All times are South African (GMT+2)

=== Group A ===
Pos	Team	Pld	W	D	L	GF	GA	GD	Pts	
1	UP-Tuks	3	3	0	0	10	1	+9	9	Advance to Semi-Finals
2	Wits	3	1	1	1	3	6	−3	4	Advance to Semi-Finals
3	UFH	3	0	2	1	0	2	−2	2	
4	UKZN	3	0	1	2	2	6	−4	1	

11 August
13:00 CAT

UFH	0–0	UKZN

TUT Stadium
11 August
15:00 CAT

UP-Tuks	5–0	Wits

TUT Stadium
12 August
10:00 CAT

UFH	0–0	Wits

TUT Stadium
12 August
16:00 CAT

UKZN	1–3	UP-Tuks

TUT Stadium
11 August
14:00 CAT

UKZN	1–3	Wits

TUT Stadium
13 August
16:00 CAT

UP-Tuks	2–0	UFH

TUT Stadium

=== Group B ===
Pos	Team	Pld	W	D	L	GF	GA	GD	Pts	
1	UJ	3	3	0	0	9	2	+7	9	Advance to Semi-Finals
2	UWC	3	2	0	1	10	4	+6	6	Advance to Semi-Finals
3	TUT (H)	3	1	0	2	6	9	−3	3	
4	DUT	3	0	0	3	2	12	−10	0	

(H) Hosts
11 August
17:00 CAT

UJ	2–1	UWC

TUT Stadium
11 August
19:00 CAT

TUT	4–1	DUT

TUT Stadium
12 August
10:00 CAT

TUT	1–3	UJ

TUT Stadium
12 August
14:00 CAT

UWC	4–1	DUT

TUT Stadium
13 August
10:00 CAT

UJ	4–0	DUT

TUT Stadium
13 August
12:00 CAT

UWC	5–1	TUT

TUT Stadium

== Knockout stages ==
Semi-finals
14 August – TUT Stadium
UJ	3
Wits	0
14 August – TUT Stadium
UWC	1
UP	0

Final
19 August – TUT Stadium
UJ	0
UWC	2

=== 7th-place match ===
14 August
13:00 CAT UTC+02:00

DUT	1–1	UKZN

TUT Stadium

=== 5th-place match ===
14 August
15:00 CAT UTC+02:00

TUT	3–0	UFH

TUT Stadium

=== Semi-finals ===
14 August
17:00 CAT UTC+02:00

UJ	3–0	Wits
48' 71' Lusanda Mavundla; 90+' Sbongakonke Mzobe

TUT Stadium

14 August
19:00 CAT UTC+02:00

UWC	1–0	UP-Tuks
22' Chelsea Daniels

TUT Stadium

=== Final ===
19 August
11:00 CAT UTC+02:00

UWC	2–0	UJ
4' Lonathemba Mhlongo; 58' Katlego Mabuza

TUT Stadium

== Sponsors ==
The tournament was sponsored by:

- First National Bank
- Suzuki
- Cashbuild

== Awards ==
The following players were rated best in the tournament:

Award	Player	Team
FNB player of the tournament	Lusanda Mavundla	UJ
Suzuki Golden Boot	Lusanda Mavundla	UJ
Cashbuild Golden Glove	Siphesihle Dlamini	UWC
Cashbuild Golden Glove	Matshidiso Masebe	UJ
