= Disebo Mametja =

South African soccer player

Personal information
- Position: Forward

Senior career*
| Years | Team | Apps | (Gls) |
| 2013 | University of Johannesburg | | |
| 2015–2017 | Gyori ETO Women | | |

International career
| 2006–2015 | South Africa | | |
- * Club domestic league appearances and goals

Disebo Mametja is a South African professional soccer player who played as a forward for the South African women's national team.

== Club career ==
=== University of Johannesburg ===
Mametja was part of the UJ Ladies team that won the inaugural Women's Varsity Football cup in 2013. She scored a brace in a 6–0 win over TUT Ladies in the final. She was named the player of the match for her efforts.

=== Gyori ETO Women ===
In September 2015, she signed a two-year contract with Női NB I side Gyori ETO Women.

== International career ==
In July 2006, she competed for the South Africa women's national soccer team in the 2006 African Women's Championship qualifiers against Tanzania and scored a goal in a 7–0 win which saw the team qualify for the tournament.

She also scored in a friendly match won 2–1 against Namibia.

== Honours ==
University of Johannesburg

- Women's Varsity Football : 2013
