= Simphiwe Dludlu =

South African soccer player

Personal information
- Full name: Simphiwe Mendy Dludlu
- Date of birth: 21 September 1987 (age 39)
- Place of birth: Alexandra, South Africa
- Position: Defender

Senior career*
Years	Team	Apps	(Gls)
–	Phomolong Ladies		
–2005	Rand Afrikaans University		
–	Mamelodi Sundowns Ladies		
–	University of Pretoria		

International career^{‡}
2006–2015	South Africa	63	(1)

Managerial career
- University of Pretoria
- Tshwane University of Technology
- 2017-2021: South Africa U/17
Medal record
Representing South Africa
African Women's Championship
Third place	2010 South Africa
COSAFA Women's Championship
Silver medal – second place	2022 South Africa
COSAFA U-17 Women's Championship
Second place	2019 Mauritius
Third place	2020 South Africa
- * Club domestic league appearances and goals as of U20 Women's national team 2006 Caps =4 ‡ National team caps and goals as of 18 November 2016

Simphiwe Mendy Dludlu (born 21 September 1987) is a South African professional soccer manager and former player. Dludlu is the former head coach of the South African women's national U/17. She led the team to their second FIFA U-17 Women's World Cup qualification in 2018 which was hosted in Uruguay.

== Early life ==
Dludlu attended TuksSport High School. In 2007, she began studies at University of Pretoria and graduated with a Sports Science degree in 2012.

== Club career ==
At a club level, Dludlu played as a defender for Mamelodi Sundowns. In football circles, she was nicknamed "Shorty".

== International career ==
Dludlu made her first appearance for the South Africa senior national team in 2006 during a match against Mozambique. She was the captain of the South African women's national team between 2009 and 2010.

In May 2014, Dludlu made her 50th cap for the South Africa senior team during a friendly match against Ghana. In September 2014, she was named to the roster in preparation for the 2014 African Women's Championship in Namibia. She announced her retirement from international football in March 2014, aspiring to pursue a career in coaching instead. She finished her playing career for the South African team on 63 caps.

== Coaching career ==
Upon graduating from the University of Pretoria in 2012, she became coach of the university women's football team, playing in the University Sports South Africa (USSA) leagues. In her first two years with the team, they reached the final of the USSA Football National Club Championships. In May 2013, Dludlu earned a UEFA B Licence coaching certificate.

Alongside other former South African women's internationals, she is a scout for the Vodafone NXT Level programme. She was also the coach of the Tshwane University of Technology women's high performance soccer team.

Currently, Dludlu is coaching the South African women's national U/17 team and qualified for the 2018 FIFA U17 Women’s World Cup in Uruguay.

In 2022, she was tasked with selecting a South Africa women's national team, the A team coached by Desiree Ellis was taking part in a series of friendly matches with Brazil and could not participate, for the 2022 COSAFA Women's Championship. Her team won a silver medal at the tournament losing out to Zambia 1-0 in the final.

== Honours ==
South Africa

- COSAFA Women's Championship: runner up: 2022
- COSAFA U-17 Women's Championship: Runners-Up: 2019, Third place: 2020
