= Regina Mogolola =

South African soccer player (born 1993)

Personal information
- Full name: Regina Keresi Mogolola
- Date of birth: 17 April 1993 (age 33)
- Place of birth: Ga-Phago village, Limpopo South Africa
- Position: Midfielder

Team information
- Current team: JVW F.C.
- Number: 30

Senior career*
Years	Team	Apps	(Gls)
2014–2018	University of Pretoria		
2019	Red Star Belgrade (women's football)		
2020–2024	Mamelodi Sundowns Ladies		
2025–	JVW F.C.		

International career
2017–	South Africa		
- * Club domestic league appearances and goals

Regina Keresi Mogolola (born 17 April 1993) is a South African soccer player who plays as a midfielder for SAFA Women's League club JVW F.C. and the South Africa women's national team.

She won the inaugural CAF Women's Champions League with Mamelodi Sundowns.

== Club career ==
=== Sundowns Ladies ===
Mogolola won the CAF Women's Champions League with Mamelodi Sundowns Ladies. She also won the SAFA Women's League with the club.

=== JVW ===
Mogolola joined JVW at the start of the 2025 season.

== International career ==
She was part of the senior team at the 2017 COSAFA Women's Championship.

Mogolola was part of the senior team that came fourth at the 2024 Women's Africa Cup of Nations in Morocco. She was also part of the team that finished as runners-up at the 2025 COSAFA Women's Championship.

== Honours ==
South Africa

- COSAFA Women's Championship runners-up: 2025

Mamelodi Sundowns Ladies

- CAF Women's Champions League: 2021, 2023
- SAFA Women's League: 2021, 2022, 2023, 2024
