= Mapaseka Mpuru =

South African footballer

Personal information
- Date of birth: 9 April 1998 (age 28)
- Height: 1.69 m (5 ft 7 in)
- Position: Goalkeeper

Team information
- Current team: TUT Matsatsantsa Ladies FC

Senior career*
Years	Team	Apps	(Gls)
–2024	University of Pretoria		
2025–	TUT Matsatsantsa Ladies F.C.		

International career^{‡}
2019–	South Africa		
- * Club domestic league appearances and goals ‡ National team caps and goals as of 24 June 2019

Mapaseka Mpuru (born 9 April 1998) is a South African football goalkeeper. She plays for the TUT Matsatsantsa Ladies FC and the South Africa women's national football team.

== Playing career ==
She played with the U20 national team; Mpuru was part of the national team that made their FIFA Women's World Cup debut at the 2019 FIFA Women's World Cup.
