= Ronnel Donnelly =

South African soccer player

- Ronnel Donnelly of Mamelodi Sundowns celebrates a goal in 2026

Personal information
- Full name: Ronnel Tammlyn Donnelly
- Date of birth: 31 March 2004 (age 22)
- Place of birth: Wentworth, KwaZulu-Natal, South Africa
- Position: Forward

Team information
- Current team: Mamelodi Sundowns Ladies
- Number: 26

College career
| Years | Team | Apps | (Gls) |
| 2022–2025 | University of the Western Cape | | |

Senior career*
| Years | Team | Apps | (Gls) |
| 2025– | Mamelodi Sundowns Ladies | | |

International career^{‡}
| 2020–2021 | South Africa U17 | | |
| 2025– | South Africa | 3 | (6) |
- * Club domestic league appearances and goals ‡ National team caps and goals as of 15 July 2025

Ronnel Tammlyn Donnelly (born 31 March 2004) is a South African soccer player who plays as a forward for Mamelodi Sundowns Ladies and the South Africa women's national team.

== College career ==
Donnelly plays for SAFA Women's League side UWC Ladies.

She was voted player of the tournament at the 2024 Women's Varsity Football and won the top scorer award after netting in 5 goals.

== Personal life ==
Born to soccer coaches Lewis and Thully Donnelly she grew up in Wentworth where she matriculated at Kloof High School.

== International career ==
Donnelly made her international debut on 7 July 2025 against Ghana at the 2024 Women's Africa Cup of Nations. She scored her first goal against Mali on 14 July 2025.

=== International goals ===
| No. | Date | Venue | Opponent | Score | Result | Competition |
|---|---|---|---|---|---|---|
| 1. | 14 July 2025 | Honneur Stadium, Oujda, Morocco | Mali | 4–0 | 4–0 | 2024 Women's Africa Cup of Nations |
| 2. | 9 October 2026 | Free State Stadium, Bloemfontein, South Africa | Madagascar | 1–0 | 4–0 | 2028 CAF Women's Olympic qualifying tournament |
| 3. | 9 October 2026 | Free State Stadium, Bloemfontein, South Africa | Madagascar | 2–0 | 4–0 | 2028 CAF Women's Olympic qualifying tournament |
| 4. | 9 October 2026 | Free State Stadium, Bloemfontein, South Africa | Madagascar | 3–0 | 4–0 | 2028 CAF Women's Olympic qualifying tournament |
| 5. | 13 October 2026 | Free State Stadium, Bloemfontein, South Africa | Madagascar | 2–0 | 3–0 | 2028 CAF Women's Olympic qualifying tournament |
| 6. | 13 October 2026 | Free State Stadium, Bloemfontein, South Africa | Madagascar | 3–0 | 3–0 | 2028 CAF Women's Olympic qualifying tournament |

== Honours ==
UWC Ladies

- SAFA Women's League: runners-up: 2024
- Women's Varsity Football: 2024

Individual

- 2024 Women's Varsity Football: Top Scorer (5 goals)
- 2024 Women's Varsity Football: Player of the Tournament
