= Sibongile Ntoane =

South African soccer player

Personal information
- Date of birth: 2 July 2003 (age 23)
- Position: Midfielder

Team information
- Current team: TUT Matsatsantsa Ladies
- Number: 8

College career
Years	Team	Apps	(Gls)
2022-	TUT Matsatsantsa Ladies		

International career
2023-	South Africa	5	(1)
Medal record
Representing South Africa
COSAFA Women's Championship
Silver medal – second place	2024 South Africa

Sibongile Ntoane (born 2 July 2003) is a South African soccer player who plays as a midfielder for SAFA Women's League club TUT Matsatsantsa Ladies and the South Africa women's national team.

== College career ==
Tshwane University of Technology

Ntoane plays for TUT Matsatsantsa Ladies. She scored a goal in the 2-1 loss to the University of North West in the 2024 Women's Varsity Football. She also scored a brace in the 6-0 win over Witwatersrand University to help the team to a second place finish and advance to the semi-finals.

== International career ==
Ntoane competed for the senior women's national team at the 2024 COSAFA Women's Championship where they finished as runners-up to Zambia. Ntoane scored her first international goal against Lesotho on 25 February 2025 when she opened the scoring in the fourth minute to give the hosts a 1-0 lead.

=== International goals ===
No.	Date	Venue	Opponent	Score	Result	Competition
1.	25 February 2025	UJ Soweto Stadium, Johannesburg, South Africa	Lesotho	1–0	2–0	Friendly

== Honours ==
- COSAFA Women's Championship: runners-up: 2024
- Women's Varsity Football: runners-up: 2024
