= 2022 Sasol League National Championship =

Tournament details
- Country: South Africa
- City: Polokwane
- Venue: Peter Mokaba Stadium
- Dates: 18 December 2022 - 23 December 2022
- Teams: 9

Final positions
- Champions: Copperbelt Ladies
- Runners-up: University of Pretoria
- Semifinalists: Lindelani Ladies; NWU Tawana

Tournament statistics
- Top goal scorer: Nomphelo Yakupi

Awards
- Best player: Nomphelo Yakupi
- Best goalkeeper: Sindisiwe Duma

The 2022 Sasol League National Championship was the 13th edition of the Sasol League National Championship since it was formed in 2009. It was held at Peter Mokaba Stadium in Polokwane.

Copperbelt Ladies defeated Tuks Ladies 3-2 via penalties, after the match ended in 1-1 draw, in the final to be crowned champions. Copperbelt Ladies walked away with R200 000 in prize money while Tuks Ladies received R100 000 for the runners-up position with both teams being promoted to the SAFA Women's League.

== Participating teams ==
All nine teams qualified through winning their provincial leagues.

Team	Provincial League
Sophakama	Eastern Cape Sasol League
Ixias Ladies	Free State Sasol League
Tuks Ladies	Gauteng Sasol League
Lindelani Ladies	KwaZulu Natal Sasol League
Copperbelt Ladies	Limpopo Sasol League
TS Galaxy Queens	Mpumalanga Sasol League
Royal Wizard	Northern Cape Sasol League
NWU Tawana	North West Sasol League
Dangerous Heroes Ladies	Western Cape Sasol League

== Knockout stages ==
=== Semi-Finals ===
21 December

Lindelani Ladies	1–1	Tuks Ladies
Miya		Dhlamini
Penalties
	2-4

Peter Mokaba Stadium
21 December

Copperbelt Ladies	2–1	NWU Tawana
Yakuphi x2		Adams

Peter Mokaba Stadium

=== Final ===
23 December

Copperbelt Ladies	1–1	Tuks Ladies
Penalties
	3-2

Peter Mokaba Stadium, Polokwane

== Awards ==
The following were rated best in the tournament:

Award	Winner	Club
Best Player	Nomphelo Yakupi	Copperbelt Ladies
Top goalscorer	Nomphelo Yakupi	Copperbelt Ladies
Best goalkeeper	Sindisiwe Duma	Tuks Ladies
Referee of the Tournament	Nonjabulo Ndlela	
Assistant Referee of the Tournament	Nomthetho Mbatsha	
