= Kholosa Biyana =

South African footballer (born 1994)

Personal information
- Full name: Kholosa Mthikazi Biyana
- Date of birth: 6 September 1994 (age 32)
- Place of birth: Ngcobo, South Africa
- Position: Midfielder

Team information
- Current team: Mamelodi Sundowns
- Number: 19

Senior career*
Years	Team	Apps	(Gls)
–2020	University of KwaZulu-Natal		
2020–2022	Sporting Gijón	43	(2)
2023	University of the Western Cape		
2023–	Mamelodi Sundowns		

International career^{‡}
2018–	South Africa	38	(2)

Managerial career
- 2024–: Mamelodi Sundowns
Medal record
Representing South Africa
Women's Africa Cup of Nations
First place	2022 Morocco
CAF Women's Champions League
Gold medal – first place	2023 Côte d'Ivoire
- * Club domestic league appearances and goals ‡ National team caps and goals as of 20 July 2023 (prior the 2023 FIFA Women's World Cup)

Kholosa Mthikazi Biyana (born 6 September 1994) is a South African soccer player and youth coach who plays as a midfielder for SAFA Women's League club Mamelodi Sundowns Ladies and the South Africa women's national team.

She was part of the national team when they won their maiden continental title at the 2022 Women's Africa Cup of Nations.

In 2023, she won her first club continental title with Sundowns Ladies at the 2023 CAF Women's Champions League.

== Playing career ==
Biyana captained UKZN Ladies in their maiden Women's Varsity Football season in 2018 and participated in three FISU World University Games.

In 2020 she signed for Segunda Federación side Sporting de Gijón in Spain.

She returned to South Africa at the start of the 2023 season and signed for UWC Ladies.

=== Mamelodi Sundowns Ladies ===
In August 2023, she joined SAFA Women's League side Mamelodi Sundowns Ladies.

She won the 2023 CAF Women's Champions League, 2023 COSAFA Women's League and the 2023 SAFA Women's League titles with Sundowns in her debut season.

=== International career ===
Biyana started for all three matches played by South Africa at the 2019 FIFA Women's World Cup. She was part of the South Africa women's national team that won the 2022 Women's Africa Cup of Nations. She was in the team that made it to the Round of 16 at the 2023 FIFA Women's World Cup and started for 2 of South Africa's 4 matches.

=== International goals ===
No.	Date	Venue	Opponent	Score	Result	Competition
1.	31 July 2019	Wolfson Stadium, KwaZakele, South Africa	Comoros	17–0	17–0	2019 COSAFA Women's Championship

== Managerial career ==
In 2024 she joined the Mamelodi Sundowns Ladies Academy as an assistant coach. In 2025 she was appointed head coach of the under-17 team that went on to win the Gauteng Women's Development League and qualify for the 2025 CAF U-17 Girls Integrated Football Tournament -COSAFA region. Her team won the tournament scoring 30 goals and only conceding once.

== Early life ==
She was born in Ngcobo. She began playing soccer when she was 8.

== Honours ==
Player

South Africa

- Women's Africa Cup of Nations: 2022

Mamelodi Sundowns Ladies

- CAF Women's Champions League: 2023
- COSAFA Women's Champions League: 2023
- SAFA Women's League: 2023, 2024, 2025

Manager

Mamelodi Sundowns Ladies Academy

- CAF U-17 Girls Integrated Football Tournament - COSAFA region: 2025
- U-17 Gauteng Women's Development League: 2025
