= Thalea Smidt =

South African soccer player

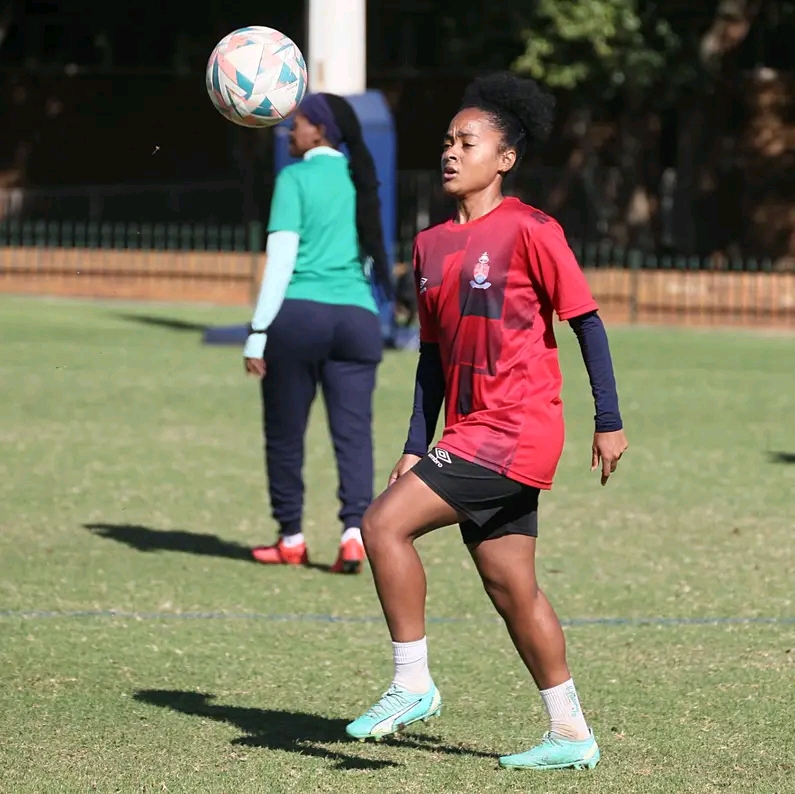

Personal information
- Full name: Thalea Lauren Smidt
- Date of birth: 27 December 1997 (age 28)
- Place of birth: Cape Town
- Position: Midfielder

Team information
- Current team: Tuks Ladies FC

Youth career
- 2018: Tuks Ladies FC

Senior career*
Years	Team	Apps	(Gls)
2021-2023	Mamelodi Sundowns Ladies		
2023-	Tuks Ladies FC (on loan)		
Medal record
Representing South Africa
Women's Africa Cup of Nations
First place	2022 Morocco
CAF Women's Champions League
Gold medal – first place	2021 Egypt
Silver medal – second place	2022 Morocco
COSAFA Women's Champions League
Gold medal – first place	2021 South Africa
Silver medal – second place	2022 South Africa
- * Club domestic league appearances and goals

Thalea Smidt (born 27 December 1997) is a South African professional soccer player who plays as a midfielder for SAFA Women's League side Tuks Ladies FC and the South Africa women's national team.

== Personal life ==
In 2018, she graduated from the University of Pretoria with a BSc Honours in Plant Sciences.

== Club career ==
=== Tuks Ladies ===
Smidt studied at the University of Pretoria and captained the Tuks Ladies FC side.

=== Mamelodi Sundowns Ladies ===
In 2021 she joined SAFA Women's League side Mamelodi Sundowns Ladies. She was part of the treble winning team. The team won the inaugural COSAFA Women's Champions League, CAF Women's Champions League, and Hollywoodbets Super League.

They were runner's up for the 2022 COSAFA Women's Champions League and the 2022 CAF Women's Champions League. They finished off the season by winning the Hollywoodbets Super League in November 2022.

=== Tuks Ladies ===
On 15 April 2023, she rejoined Tuks Ladies FC on loan for the remainder of the 2023 season.

== International career ==
Smidt competed for the South Africa women's national soccer team at the 2022 Women's Africa Cup of Nations where they won their maiden continental title. She was also part of the team when they took on Tanzania in the third round 2024 Olympic qualifiers.

== Honours ==
Club

Mamelodi Sundowns Ladies

- SAFA Women's League: 2021, 2022
- CAF Women's Champions League: 2021 runner-up: 2022
- COSAFA Women's Champions League: 2021 runner-up 2022

South Africa

- Women's Africa Cup of Nations: 2022
