= Wendy Shongwe =

South African soccer player (born 2003)

Personal information
- Date of birth: 18 January 2003 (age 23)
- Place of birth: Springs, Gauteng, South Africa
- Height: 1.63 m (5 ft 4 in)
- Position: Forward

Team information
- Current team: Mamelodi Sundowns Ladies

College career
Years	Team	Apps	(Gls)
2022–2025	University of Pretoria	35	(14)

Senior career*
Years	Team	Apps	(Gls)
2025–	Mamelodi Sundowns Ladies		

International career^{‡}
2021–	South Africa	4	(0)
- * Club domestic league appearances and goals ‡ National team caps and goals as of 20 July 2023 (prior the 2023 FIFA Women's World Cup)

Wendy Shongwe (born 18 January 2003) is a South African sprinter and soccer player who plays as a forward for SAFA Women's League club Mamelodi Sundowns Ladies and the South Africa women's national team.

== Athletics ==
Shongwe ran for Tuks Sports High and had a personla best of 60:94 in the 400m and 2:18:42 in the 800m.

== College career ==
She played for the University of Pretoria and scored 14 goals in 35 appearances. She was part of the team that were runners-up to the University of the Western Cape in the 2021 Women's Varsity Football where she won the player of the tournament. She helped her side gain promotion to the SAFA Women's League after finishing in second in the 2022 Sasol League National Championship. She suffered an injury ACL injury in March 2024 and made a return in August 2025.

== Club career ==
Shongwe signed for SAFA Women's League side Mamelod Sundowns Ladies in 2025.

== International career ==
Shongwe played at the 2023 FIFA Women's World Cup.

== Honours ==
University of Pretoria

- Sasol League National Championship runners-up: 2022
- Women's Varsity Football runners-up: 2021

Individual

- 2021 Women's Varsity Football: Player of the tournament
