= Amogelang Motau =

South African soccer player

Personal information
- Full name: Amogelang Masego Motau
- Date of birth: 27 February 1997 (age 29)
- Place of birth: Modimolle
- Height: 1.62 m (5 ft 4 in)
- Position: Midfielder

Team information
- Current team: Club Tijuana
- Number: 17

Youth career
- Kanatla Ladies
- HPC

Senior career*
Years	Team	Apps	(Gls)
2015–2016	University of the Western Cape		
2017–2019	Oral Roberts Golden Eagles		
2020–2024	University of the Western Cape		
2025–	Club Tijuana	28	(1)

International career
2016	South Africa U20		
2016–	South Africa		
Medal record
Representing South Africa
Women's Africa Cup of Nations
First place	2022 Morocco
- * Club domestic league appearances and goals as of 9 February 2026

Amogelang Masego Motau (born 27 February 1997) is a South African professional soccer player who plays as a midfielder for Liga MX Femenil side Club Tijuana and the South Africa women's national team.

She was part of the Banyana Banyana team when they won their maiden continental title at the 2022 Women's Africa Cup of Nations.

Motau captained the University of the Western Cape when they became the first university to win the COSAFA Women's Champions League and qualify for the CAF Women's Champions League in 2024. She was named in the group stage best XI at the 2024 CAF Women's Champions League.

She was named the 2024 SAFA Women's League Player of the Season.

== Personal life ==
In April 2023, she graduated from the University of the Western Cape with a Bachelor of Administration degree.

== Club career ==
=== University of the Western Cape ===
She captained the 2016 team that won the USSA title, the Western Cape Sasol Women's League, the Western Cape Coke Cup, and were runner's up in the Women's Varsity Football cup.

=== Oral Roberts Golden Eagles ===
In 2017, she joined Oral Roberts University in Oklahoma and was named in the 2018 Summit League All-League All-Freshman team.

=== University of the Western Cape ===
In 2024 she captained the university to the 2024 COSAFA Women's Champions League and also made it to the group stage best XI at the tournament. She was named in the group stage best XI at the 2024 CAF Women's Champions League.

She was named the 2024 SAFA Women's League Player of the Season.

=== Club Tijuana Femenil ===
In January 2025, she moved to Liga MX Femenil side Club Tijuana.

== International career ==
She captained the Basetsana team that lost out to Nigeria in the final round of matches at the 2016 African U-20 Women's World Cup qualifiers.

In 2016 she made her senior team debut against Egypt in a friendly match.

She competed for the South Africa women's national soccer team at the 2022 Women's Africa Cup of Nations when they won their maiden continental title.

=== International goals ===
No.	Date	Venue	Opponent	Score	Result	Competition
1	4 June 2024	Stade Lat-Dior, Thiès, Senegal	Senegal	1–0	2–0	Friendly
2	2 December 2024	Montego Bay Sports Complex, Montego Bay, Jamaica	Jamaica	2–3	2–3	Friendly

== Honours ==
University of the Western Cape

- COSAFA Women's Champions League: 2024
- USSA: 2016
- Women's Varsity Football Cup: Runners-up: 2016
- Western Cape Sasol Women's League: 2016
- 2016 Coke Cup Winners Western Cape

Oral Roberts Golden Eagles

- 2018 All Freshman Team

Individual

- 2024 CAF Women's Champions League: Group Stage Best XI
- 2024 COSAFA Women's Champions League: Group Stage Best XI
- 2024 SAFA Women's League: Player of the Season
