= Thubelihle Shamase =

South African professional soccer player (born 2002)

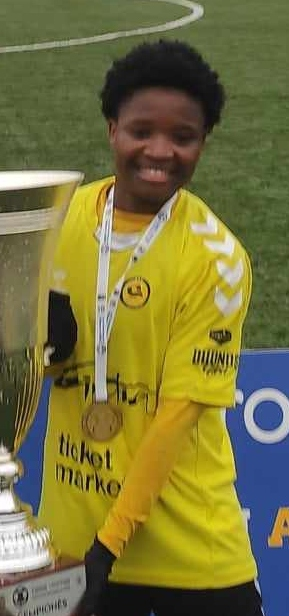

Personal information
- Date of birth: 16 January 2002 (age 24)
- Place of birth: Verulam, South Africa
- Height: 1.62 m (5 ft 4 in)
- Position: Midfielder

Team information
- Current team: University of Johannesburg

Senior career*
Years	Team	Apps	(Gls)
2022–2023	University of Johannesburg	50	(18)
2024	FC Gintra	17	(8)
2025–	University of Johannesburg		

International career
2017–2018	South Africa U17		
2019	South Africa U20		
2022–	South Africa		
Medal record
Representing South Africa
Women's Africa Cup of Nations
First place	2022 Morocco
- * Club domestic league appearances and goals

Thubelihle Shamase (born 16 January 2002) is a South African soccer player who plays as a midfielder for SAFA Women's League side UJ Ladies and the South Africa women's national team.

== Club career ==
=== UJ Ladies ===
Shamase played for SAFA Women's League side the University of Johannesburg. In 2022, she won the Gauteng ENGEN Knockout Challenge whilst playing for the U/20 team. She won the player of the tournament, top goal scorer and striker of the tournament awards for her efforts.

In 2023, she was nominated for the CAF Young Player of the Year (Women) award.

=== FC Gintra ===
In March 2024, she joined A Lyga side FC Gintra. She made her debut on 24 March 2024.

She scored her first goal for the club on 21 April 2024 in a 4–0 win against FC Hegelmann. She scored her second goal on 27 April 2024 in a 5–0 win over FK Banga. She won the A Lyga with the team in 2024.

=== UJ Ladies ===
In May 2025, she rejoined SAFA Women's League side UJ Ladies.

== International career ==
In 2017, she was selected in the Bantwana squad for the FIFA U/17 Women's World Cup Qualifiers. Shamase competed for Bantwana at the 2018 FIFA U/17 Women's World Cup.

She was part of the South African women's national team at the 2022 Women's Africa Cup of Nations where they won their first continental title in 2022.

In 2023, she competed for the South African women's national team at the 2023 Cosafa Women's Championship where she won the silver boot scoring 5 goals. Later in the year, she was added to the national team for the 2024 Women's Africa Cup of nations qualifier and was nominated for the CAF Young Player of the Year (Women).

== Personal life ==
She has an identical twin sister, Sphumelele Shamase, who is also a soccer player.

== Career statistics ==
=== Club ===
As of match played 8 November 2024

Appearances and goals by club, season and competition
Club	Season	League			Cup		League Cup		Continental		Total	
Club	Season	Division	Apps	Goals	Apps	Goals	Apps	Goals	Apps	Goals	Apps	Goals
FC Gintra	2024	A Lyga	17	8	0	0	7	2	2	1	26	11
Career total			17	8	0	0	7	2	2	1	26	11

== International goals ==
No.	Date	Venue	Opponent	Score	Result	Competition
1.	4 October 2023	Lucas Moripe Stadium, Pretoria, South Africa	Malawi	1–1	3–4	2023 COSAFA Women's Championship
2.	7 October 2023	Dobsonville Stadium, Johannesburg, South Africa	Madagascar	1–0	3–1	2023 COSAFA Women's Championship
3.	10 October 2023	Dobsonville Stadium, Johannesburg, South Africa	Eswatini	1–0	3–0	2023 COSAFA Women's Championship
4.	10 October 2023	Dobsonville Stadium, Johannesburg, South Africa	Eswatini	2–0	3–0	2023 COSAFA Women's Championship
5.	10 October 2023	Dobsonville Stadium, Johannesburg, South Africa	Eswatini	3–0	3–0	2023 COSAFA Women's Championship

== Honours ==
- Women's Africa Cup of Nations: 2022
- A Lyga: 2024
- ENGEN Knockout Challenge: 2022, 2023

Individual

- ENGEN Knockout Challenge: Top scorer: 2022
- ENGEN Knockout Challenge: Player of the Tournament: 2022
- ENGEN Knockout Challenge: Striker of the Tournament: 2022
