= Pirates Cup (women) =

Women's Soccer Tournament

Pirates Cup (Women)
- Organiser(s): Orlando Pirates F.C.
- Founded: 2023; 3 years ago
- Region: South Africa
- Teams: 16 as of 2026
- Current champions: TS Galaxy Queens (1st title)
- Most championships: Tuks Ladies; JVW; Mamelodi Sundowns; TS Galaxy Queens (1 title)
- Motto: Where talent meets opportunity
- Website: www.orlandopiratesfc.com
- 2026

The Pirates Cup (Women) is an U/21 women's soccer tournament hosted by Orlando Pirates.

== History ==
The inaugural edition consisted of eight U/21 women's teams and was held at Wits Marks Park in Emmarentia from 19 - 21 March 2023. Tuks Ladies defeated UJ Ladies 2–1 in the final.

The second edition took place from 28 March - 1 April 2024 at Wits Marks Park. JVW Sapphires were crowned champions after defeating Mamelodi Sundowns Ladies Academy 4-3 via penalties after the match ended in a 1–1 draw.

The third edition took place from 18 - 21 April 2025 at Wits Marks Park. Mamelodi Sundowns Ladies were crowned champions after defeating UJ Ladies 1–0 in the final.

The fourth edition was expanded to 16 teams and hosted at the University of Johannesburg's AW Muller Stadium from 3 - 6 April 2026. TS Galaxy Queens defeated defending champions Mamelodi Sundowns Ladies 1–0 in the final.

== Champions ==
List of past champions:

Year	Champions	Runners-up
2023	Tuks Ladies	UJ Ladies
2024	JVW Sapphires	Mamelodi Sundowns Ladies
2025	Mamelodi Sundowns Ladies	UJ Ladies
2026	TS Galaxy Queens	Mamelodi Sundowns Ladies

== Awards ==
The following players were rated best:

Year	Golden Boot	Team	MVP	Team	Golden Glove	Team
2023	Victoria Biathole (7 goals)	UJ Ladies	Onewane Laka	Tuks Ladies	not awarded	
2024	Lithemba Samsam; Sibahle Maneli (5 goals)	TS Galaxy Queens	Julia Goncalves	JVW	Mbali Ntimane	Mamelodi Sundowns Ladies
2025	Bonolo Mokoma (7 goals)	JVW	Bonolo Mokoma	JVW	not awarded	
2026	Bonolo Mokoma	JVW	Lesego Nkoane	TS Galaxy Queens	Kgomotso Mussimango	Mamelodi Sundowns Ladies
2026	Patience Ndhlovu (5 goals)	Nsingizini Hotspurs	Lesego Nkoane	TS Galaxy Queens	Kgomotso Mussimango	Mamelodi Sundowns Ladies

== Sponsor ==
The tournament is sponsored by:

- Orlando Pirates (host)
- Vodacom
- adidas
- aQuelle
- Oppo
- Marriott Bonvoy
