= Sphumelele Shamase =

South African professional soccer player (born 2002)

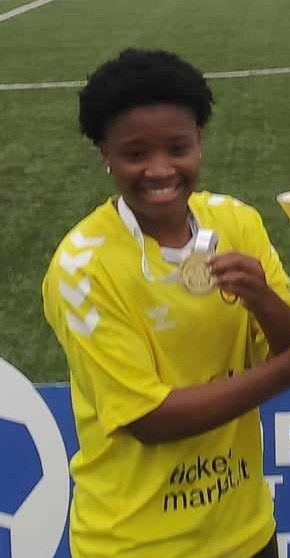

Personal information
- Date of birth: 16 January 2002 (age 24)
- Place of birth: Verulam
- Height: 1.58 m (5 ft 2 in)
- Position: Midfielder

Team information
- Current team: University of Johannesburg

Youth career
- –2022: Sunflower WFC

Senior career*
Years	Team	Apps	(Gls)
–2023	University of Johannesburg	50	(28)
2024	FC Gintra	13	(12)
2025–	University of Johannesburg		

International career
2017–2018	South Africa U17		
2019	South Africa U20		
2022–	South Africa		
Medal record
Representing South Africa
COSAFA Women's Championship
Silver medal – second place	2022 South Africa
- * Club domestic league appearances and goals

Sphumelele Shamase (born 16 January 2002) is a South African soccer player who plays as a winger for SAFA Women's League side UJ Ladies and the South Africa women's national team.

== Club career ==
=== UJ Ladies ===
Shamase currently plays for the UJ Ladies F.C.

In 2023, she was the top scorer in the 2023 Hollywoodbets Super League finishing with 22 goals.

=== FC Gintra ===
On 6 May 2024 she joined A Lyga side FC Gintra. She made her debut in a 3-1 win over Rīgas FS on 8 May 2024. She won the A Lyga title with the team in her first season.

In her first appearance in the UEFA Women's Champions League on 4 September 2024, Shamase scored a hat-trick in a 5-0 victory over Moldovan champions Anenii Noi.

Shamase finished her first season in Europe with 12 league goals in 13 appearances for FC Gintra, with 17 goals in 21 appearances across all competitions.

=== UJ Ladies ===
In May 2025, she rejoined SAFA Women's League side UJ Ladies.

== International career ==
In 2017, she was selected in the Bantwana squad for the FIFA U/17 Women's World Cup Qualifiers. Shamase competed for Bantwana at the 2018 FIFA U/17 Women's World Cup.

In 2022, she competed for the South African women's national team at the 2022 COSAFA Women's Championship were they finished as runners-up to Zambia. Shamase scored 2 goals in the tournament.

In 2023, she was part of the team that was selected for the 2023 COSAFA Women's Championship where they existed in the group stages and was also added to the senior national team for the 2024 Women's Africa Cup of nations qualifier against Burkina Faso.

== Personal life ==
She has an identical twin sister, Thubelihle Shamase, who also plays soccer.

== Career statistics ==
=== Club ===
As of match played 8 November 2024

Appearances and goals by club, season and competition
Club	Season	League			Cup		League Cup		Continental		Total	
Club	Season	Division	Apps	Goals	Apps	Goals	Apps	Goals	Apps	Goals	Apps	Goals
FC Gintra	2024	A Lyga	13	12	0	0	6	2	2	3	21	17
Career total			13	12	0	0	6	2	2	3	21	17

=== International goals ===
No.	Date	Venue	Opponent	Score	Result	Competition
1.	31 August 2022	Nelson Mandela Bay Stadium, Gqeberha, South Africa	Angola	2–0	3–0	2022 COSAFA Women's Championship
2.	6 September 2022	Wolfson Stadium, Gqeberha, South Africa	Mozambique	1–1	1–1	2022 COSAFA Women's Championship
3.	4 October 2023	Lucas Moripe Stadium Pretoria, South Africa	Malawi	3–4	3–4	2023 COSAFA Women's Championship

== Honours ==
South Africa

- COSAFA Women's Championship runner up: 2022

FC Gintra

- A Lyga: 2024

University of Johannesburg

- ENGEN Knockout Challenge: 2022, 2023

Individual

- 2023 Hollywoodbets Super League top scorer (22 goals)
