= Mamelodi Sundowns Ladies Academy =

Girls soccer academy in South Africa

- Full name: Mamelodi Sundowns Ladies Academy
- Nicknames: Young Banyana ba Style; Young Brazilians
- Short name: Sundowns, MSFC, MSL
- Founded: 2021; 5 years ago
- Owner: Patrice Motsepe
- Chairman: Tlhopie Motsepe
- Coach: (South Africa) Asa Rabalao (South Africa) Kholosa Biyana (South Africa) Rhoda Mulaudzi
- League: Sasol Women's League; Gauteng Women's Development League
- 1st
- Website: www.sundownsfc.co.za
Home colours	Away colours

Mamelodi Sundowns Ladies Academy is a women's soccer academy based in Pretoria, South Africa. The U/20 team competes in the Sasol Women's League, the second tier women's league in South Africa while the academy teams compete in the Gauteng Women's Development League, the Gauteng regional women's football league for U/19 teams in the province.

It is the academy team of Mamelodi Sundowns Ladies.

In 2025 they won their maiden Pirates Cup title and the CAF U-17 Girls Integrated Football Tournament-COSAFA region.

In 2024 they were crowned the Engen Champ of Champs, Tshwane SAFA Women's Regional League champions, Gauteng SAFA Women's Regional League and both age groups of the Gauteng Women's Development League.

== Sasol team ==
In March 2024, they were runners up of the Pirates Cup. They lost 4-3 via penalties to JVW after the match ended in a 1–1 draw. In July 2024 they won their maiden Engen Knockout Challenge defeating defending champions UJ Ladies 4-3 via penalties after the match ended in a goalless draw. In September 2024 they won their maiden Engen Champ of Champs title after defeating Durban Ladies from KwaZulu-Natal 1–0 in the final. They rounded out the 2024 season as champions of the Tshwane SAFA Women's Regional League and the Gauteng Women's Soccer League.

In 2025 they won their maiden Pirates Cup title, defeating UJ Ladies 1–0 in the final. They defended their Gauteng Women's Soccer League title and won their maiden Gauteng Sasol Women's League in their first season.

== Academy ==
In 2022 they won the 2022 Volkswagen Vaya Cup.

=== Gauteng Women's Development League ===
In 2023, the U/15 team won the inaugural Gauteng Women's Development League undefeated. They also won the inaugural GWDL Top 8 title by defeating JVW Girls 4-2 in the final. In the 2024 season, the U/16 team opened with a 14–1 win over West Youth Academy to set a league record. The U/14 team won their first league match 7–0 against Origin F.C. on the 24th of March 2024. The U/16 and U/14 teams both won their leagues in 2024. In 2025 the U/17s won the league for the third year in a row and qualified for the CAF U-17 Girls Integrated Football Tournament - COSAFA region.

In 2026 the newly established U/13 team and the U/17s won the GWDL Top 8 titles.

=== CAF GIFT ===
They won the CAF U-17 Girls Integrated Football Tournament - COSAFA region winning the final 5–0 against Lesotho's Lishoeshoe. They scored 30 goals and only conceded once.

== Notable players ==
=== FIFA U-17 Women's World Cup ===
List of players that were called up for a FIFA U-17 Women's World Cup while playing for the academy. In brackets, the tournament played:

- Alice Khosa (2010)
- Nkateko Nkhuna (2018)
- Karabo Dhlamini (2018)
- Zethembiso Vilakazi (2018)
- Oratile Mokwena (2018)
- Mananki Makhoana (2018)

=== CAF African Schools Football Championship ===
List of players that were called up for a CAF African Schools Football Championship while playing for the academy. In brackets, the tournament played:

- Katleho Malebane (2024)

Players that were called up for Banyana Banyana while playing for the academy:

- Katleho Malebane

Players that were called up for Basetsana while playing for the academy:

- Lindelwa Mabuza
- Gugu Mabizela

Players that were called up for Bantwana while playing for the academy:

- Sethabile Kamwanda
- Lindelwa Mabuza
- Gugu Mabizela
- Mashilo Molalakgotla
- Micheala Swarts
- Busisiwe Mokoena

== Honours ==
Under-20

- Gauteng Sasol Women's League: 2025
- Gauteng Regional League Provincial Championship: 2024
- Tshwane SAFA Women's Regional League: 2024
- Gauteng Women's Soccer League: 2024, 2025
- Engen Champ of Champs: 2024
- Pirates Cup (Women): 2025, Runners-up: 2024
- Gauteng Engen Knockout Challenge: 2024, 2026

Under-17

- CAF U-17 Girls Integrated Football Tournament- COSAFA region: 2025
- Volkswagen Vaya Cup: 2022
- Gauteng Women's Development League: 2023, 2024, 2025
- GWDL Top 8: 2024, 2026

Under-15

- Gauteng Women's Development League: 2024

Under-13

- GWDL Top 8: 2026
