= Lesego Nkoane =

South African soccer player

Personal information
- Date of birth: 28 December 1997 (age 28)
- Place of birth: Soweto, Gauteng, South Africa
- Position: Midfielder

Team information
- Current team: TS Galaxy Queens

Youth career
- 2015–2020: Gauteng High Performance Centre

Senior career*
Years	Team	Apps	(Gls)
2019–2022	Witwatersrand University		
2023–	TS Galaxy Queens		

International career^{‡}
2014–2016	South Africa U20		
2024–	South Africa	1	(0)
- * Club domestic league appearances and goals ‡ National team caps and goals as of )

Lesego Nkoane is a South African soccer player who plays as a defender for SAFA Women's League club TS Galaxy Queens and the South Africa women's national team.

Nkoane studied a Bachelor of Arts degree at the University of the Witwatersrand.

== Club career ==
=== Witwatersrand University Women ===
In 2019 she joined Sasol Women's League side Witwatersrand University.

=== TS Galaxy Queens ===
In 2023 she joined SAFA Women's League club TS Galaxy Queens.

== International career ==
She competed for the Basetsana team for the 2014 African U-20 Women's World Cup qualifiers where they lost out on a place in the final stage of qualification.

Nkoane made her senior international debut on 27 February 2024 in the third round Olympic qualifier against Tanzania.
