= University of the Western Cape Women's F.C. =

UWC Ladies F.C.
- Full name: University of the Western Cape Women's Football Club
- Nicknames: "The Blues and Gold" "The Caracals" "uDubs"
- Ground: UWC Stadium
- Capacity: 2500
- Coordinates: 33.934993°S 18.634121°E
- Owner: University of the Western Cape
- Head of Department: (South Africa) Emma Hendricks
- Head Coach: (South Africa) Thinasonke Mbuli
- League: SAFA Women's League
- 2025: 5th
- Website: https://www.uwc.ac.za/campus-life/sport/sport-codes

The University of the Western Cape Women's F.C., also known as UWC Ladies F.C., is the women's football club representing the University of the Western Cape based in Bellville, Western Cape. The senior team competes in the SAFA Women's League, the top tier women's football league in South Africa.

In 2024 they won the 2024 COSAFA Women's Champions League and qualified for the 2024 CAF Women's Champions League becoming the first university to qualify for the CAF Women's Champions League.

UWC are the 2021, 2023, 2024, and 2025 Women's Varsity Football champions.

== History ==
=== Women's Varsity Football ===
They were runners-up in the 2018 and 2019 Women's Varsity Football editions losing both finals to TUT Ladies.

The team won their maiden Women's Varsity Football Cup 4–3 via penalties against UP-Tuks Ladies after the match ended in a goalless draw. They had won all their matches in group B and kept a clean sheet throughout the tournament.

In 2022, they lost their Women's Varsity Football Cup title 5–3 via penalties to UJ Ladies after a goalless draw.

In 2023, they reclaimed the Women's Varsity Football Cup winning 2–0 against defending champions UJ Ladies and successfully defended their title in 2024 and 2025.

=== SAFA Women's League ===
The university is one of the founding teams of the SAFA Women's League. They finished in 6th position in the inaugural season. They rounded off the 2021 season with a third place finish in the league with 53 points.

In the 2022 SAFA Women's League, they finished as runner's up with 68 points to Mamelodi Sundowns Ladies' 82 points. In the 2023 season, the side were runner-ups for the second time in a row finishing with 75 points to Mamelodi Sundowns Ladies' 78 points. In 2024 season, they finished second for the third consecutive year finishing with 69 points.

=== COSAFA Women's Champions League ===
In July 2024 it was confirmed that the 2023 SAFA Women's League second placed team would represent South Africa at the 2024 COSAFA Women's Champions League. This made the University of the Western Cape the first university to qualify for the Champions League qualifiers. On 15 August 2024, they opened their 2024 COSAFA Women's Champions League with a 1–0 loss to Green Buffaloes from Zambia. They won their next match with a 3–0 win over FC Ongos from Namibia. They topped group A and qualified for the semi-finals with a 2–1 win over Herentals Queens from Zimbabwe.

In the semi-finals against Young Buffaloes from Eswatini they won the match 6–0. They won the final 9–8 via penalties against Gaborone United Ladies from Botswana after the match ended in a 1–1 draw. This meant they qualified for the 2024 CAF Women's Champions League and will became the first university to play in the CAF Women's Champions League. They also won the fair play award.

=== CAF Women's Champions League ===
They opened the tournament with a 2–0 loss to TP Mazembe from DR Congo. They recorded their first win in their second match with 2–0 win over Aigles de la Médina from Senegal. They lost their final group stage match 2–0 against AS FAR from Morocco, ending the tournament third in group A and 6th overall.

== Honours ==
- COSAFA Women's Champions League: 2024
- SAFA Women's League: Runner-up: 2022, 2023, 2024 Third: 2021
- Women's Varsity Football Cup: 2021, 2023, 2024, 2025 Runner's-up: 2018, 2019, 2022
- 2024 COSAFA Women's Champions League: Fair Play

== Notable players ==
=== FIFA World Cup participants ===
List of players that were called up for a FIFA Women's World Cup while playing for the university. In brackets, the tournament played:

- (South Africa) Bongeka Gamede (2019, 2023)
- (South Africa) Fikile Magama (2023)
- (South Africa) Sibulele Holweni (2023)
- (South Africa) Kholosa Biyana (2023)

Players who have received a Banyana Banyana call up while playing for the university:

- Thembi Kgatlana
- Leandre Smeda
- Noxolo Cesane
- Regirl Ngobeni
- Amogelang Motau
- Nondumiso Manengela
- Unathi Simayile

== Team statistics ==
=== CAF Women's Champions League record ===
Season	Pos	Record						
Season	Pos	P	W	D	L	F	A	GD
2024	6th place	3	1	0	2	2	4	(2)

=== COSAFA Women's Champions League record ===
Season	Pos	Record						
Season	Pos	P	W	D	L	F	A	GD
2024	Champions	5	3	1	1	12	3	9

=== SAFA Women's League record ===
Season	Pos	Record							
Season	Pos	P	W	D	L	F	A	GD	Pst
2019-20	6th	22	7	9	6	46	27	19	30
2021	3rd	26	15	8	3	47	16	31	53
2022	2nd	30	20	8	2	55	13	42	68
2023	2nd	30	25	0	5	66	17	49	75
2024	2nd	30	22	3	5	76	22	54	69
2025	5th	30	13	9	8	40	17	23	48

- Orange = In progress
- Gold = Champions
- Silver = Runner up

==== SAFA Women's League statistics ====
- Record number of games won in a season: 25 games (2023)
- Record number of points in a season: 75 points (2023)
- Record goals scored in a season: 76 goals (2024)
- Record for lowest number of goals conceded in a season: 13 goals (2022)
- Record for lowest number of defeats in a season: 2 games (2022)
