= University of Johannesburg Women's F.C. =

UJ Ladies F.C.
- Full name: University of Johannesburg Women's Football Club
- Nickname: Orange Army
- Ground: UJ Soweto Stadium
- Capacity: 900
- Coordinates: 26.1785°S 27.9908°E
- Owner: University of Johannesburg
- Head coach: (South Africa) Nthabeleng Modiko
- League: SAFA Women's League
- 2025: 7th
- Website: https://www.uj.ac.za/sports/sport-clubs/uj-football-club/
Home colours	Away colours

The University of Johannesburg Women's Football Club, also knowns as UJ Ladies, is the football club representing the University of Johannesburg based in Johannesburg, Gauteng. The senior team competes in the SAFA Women's League, the top tier women's football league in South Africa.

== History ==
In 2018, they won their first University Sport South Africa (USSA) title and defended the title in 2019. The team won their third USSA title in 2022 winning 1–0 against the Tuks Ladies. They won their fourth in 2025 winning 3–0 against TUT Ladies.

=== Women's Varsity Football ===
They won the inaugural Women's Varsity Football winning 6–0 against TUT Ladies.

In 2022, they won the 2022 FNB Women's Varsity Football Cup edition 5-3 on penalties following a goalless draw against defending champions UWC Ladies on Sunday, 16 October 2022.

They were runners up for the 2023 and 2025 edition following a 2–0 and 1–0 loss against the UWC Ladies.

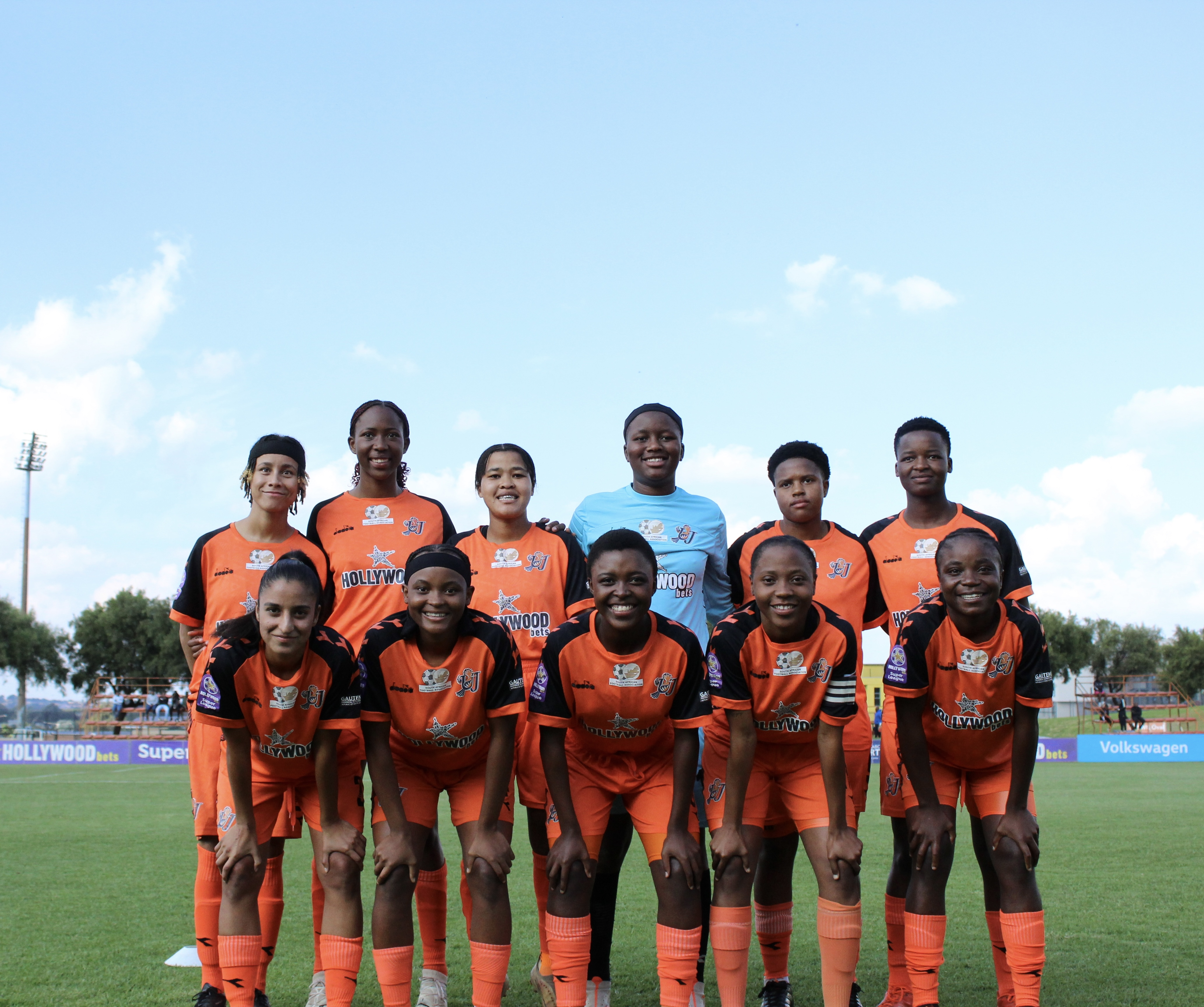
UJ Ladies in 2025

In the 2024 season, they made their best start to the league and were tied on points with log leader Mamelodi Sundowns Ladies after 11 matches. They ended the season in fourth place.

== U/20 squad ==
The junior team won the 2022 Gauteng Engen Knockout Challenge by defeating JVW Sapphires 2–0 in the final held at Wits Marks Park. They successfully defended their Gauteng Engen Knockout Challenge title in July 2023 winning 1–0 against JVW Sapphires. In 2024 they lost the Engen Knockout Challenge 4-3 via penalties to Mamelodi Sundowns after the match ended in a goalless draw. They retained the title in 2025 and went on to win the ENGEN Champ of Champs for a third time.

They were runner's up at the inaugural Pirates Cup following a 2–1 defeat to Tuks Ladies in March 2023. They were runners-up again in 2025 going down 1–0 to Mamelodi Sundowns.

== Stadium ==
UJ's home ground is the UJ Soweto Stadium located on the university's Soweto campus.

== Notable players ==
=== FIFA World Cup participants ===
List of players that were called up for a FIFA Women's World Cup while playing for the university. In brackets, the tournament played:

- (South Africa) Amanda Mthandi (2019)

=== Summer Olympics participants ===
List of players that were called up for the Summer Olympic Games while playing for the university. In brackets, the tournament played:

- (South Africa) Amanda Dlamini (2012)
- (South Africa) Thokozile Mndaweni (2012)
- (South Africa) Noko Matlou (2012)

Players who have received a Banyana Banyana call up while playing for the university:

- Disebo Mametja
- Sphumelele Shamase
- Thubelihle Shamase
- Ayesha Moosa
- Nobahle Mdelwa
- Shannon Macomo
- Adrielle Mibe
- Yolanda Nduli
- Matshidiso Masebe
- Dineo Magagula

== Honours and tournament history ==
- Women's Varsity Football: 2013, 2022, runners-up: 2023, 2025
- USSA Football National Championships: 2018, 2019, 2022, 2025, Third place: 2023

Under-20 titles

- ENGEN Champ of Champs: 2022, 2023, 2025
- Gauteng Engen Knockout Challenge: 2022, 2023, 2025, Runners-Up: 2024, 2026
- Pirates Cup runners-up: 2023, 2025

== Team statistics ==
=== SAFA Women's League record ===
Season	Pos	Record							
Season	Pos	P	W	D	L	F	A	GD	Pst
2019-20	8th	22	8	2	12	35	57	(22)	26
2021	9th	26	7	8	11	26	39	(13)	29
2022	5th	30	15	6	9	59	41	18	51
2023	9th	30	13	4	13	53	40	13	43
2024	4th	30	20	5	5	56	20	36	65
2025	7th	30	12	6	12	37	41	(4)	42

- Orange = In progress
- Gold = Champions
- Silver = Runner up

==== SAFA Women's League statistics ====
- Record number of games won in a season: 20 games (2024)
- Record number of points in a season: 65 points (2024)
- Record goals scored in a season: 59 goals (2022)
- Record for lowest number of goals conceded in a season: 20 goals (2024)
- Record for lowest number of defeats in a season: 5 games (2024)
