= ENGEN Knockout Challenge =

Youth Soccer Tournament

- Organiser(s): Engen
- Founded: 2003; 23 years ago
- Region: South Africa
- Teams: 72
- Qualifier for: ENGEN Champ of Champs
- Website: http://www.engenknockoutchallenge.co.za/

The ENGEN Knockout Challenge is an annual youth soccer tournament in South Africa hosted by Engen Petroleum in partnership with SAFA. First hosted in 2003, the tournament celebrated its 20-year anniversary in 2023 and is one of the longest running youth tournaments in the country. The tournament serves as a qualification for the ENGEN Champ of Champs where the winners of the nine provincial titles battle it out to be crowned Champ of Champs.

In 2020, Engen announced the launch of the women's division to be contested by U/20 teams. The 2021 Cape Town leg saw the first women's champion crowned.

== Winners ==
=== Johannesburg leg Men's U/17 ===
Johannesburg Men's U/17 Winners
Year	Winners	Runners-up	Ref
2015	Mamelodi Sundowns	Bidvest Wits	
2016			
2017	Stars of Africa		
2018			
2019			
2020			
2021	Jomo Cosmos	TS Galaxy	
2022	Kaizer Chiefs	Mamelodi Sundowns	
2023	Mamelodi Sundowns	TS Galaxy	
2024	Kaizer Chiefs	Mamelodi Sundowns	
2025	Panorama	Kaizer Chiefs	
2026	Kaizer Chiefs	Kathorus Hyper Academy	

=== Johannesburg leg Women's U/20 ===
Johannesburg Women's U/20 Winners
Year	Winners	Runner-up	Ref
2021	Kempton Park Ladies		
2022	University of Johannesburg	JVW Sapphires	
2023	University of Johannesburg	JVW Sapphires	
2024	Mamelodi Sundowns Ladies	University of Johannesburg	
2025	University of Johannesburg	JVW Sapphires	
2026	Mamelodi Sundowns Ladies	University of Johannesburg	

=== Cape Town leg men's U/17 ===
Cape Town Men's U/17 Winners
Year	Winners	Runners-up	Ref
2014	ASD Cape Town	Liverpool-Portlands	
2015			
2016			
2017	Old Mutual Football Academy		
2018	Hellenic	Hout Bay United	
2019			
2020			
2021	Ubuntu Cape Town	Cape Town City	
2022	Cape Town City	Stellenbosch	
2023	Stellenbosch	Ubuntu Cape Town	
2024	Stellenbosch	Cape Town City	

=== Cape Town leg women's U/20 ===
Cape Town Women's U/20 Winners
Year	Winners	Runner-up	Ref
2021	RV United Women	Spurs Women	
2022	Cape Town Roses	Dangerous Heros	
2023	Cape Town Roses	RV United Women	
2024	Cape Town Roses	Dangerous Heros	
