= University Sports South Africa =

- Sport: University Sport
- Jurisdiction: South Africa
- Abbreviation: USSA
- Founded: 1992
- Affiliation: FISU
- Affiliation date: 7 July 1993
- Regional affiliation: FASU
- Affiliation date: 17 September 1996
- Location: Loftus Versfeld Stadium; Kirkness Street; Sunnyside, Pretoria
- President: Jerry Laka

Official website
- www.ussa.org.za
- (South Africa)

University Sports South Africa (USSA) is the governing body for sports competitions and student-athletes in South Africa.

== Team South Africa ==
Team South Africa is the USSA team formed of student-athletes that represent the country at FISU events.

=== Basketball 3x3 ===
In 2023 the University of Johannesburg hosted the 5th FASU 3×3 Basketball Championship. The university's men's team ended the champion in fourth place after going down 21-12 to Ghana in the bronze match.

=== Netball ===
In 2024 the women’s netball team won the CUCSA Region V games held in Tshwane, South Africa. They defeated Zimbabwe 96-30 in the final.

=== Soccer ===
Team South Africa won gold in the men’s and women’s soccer events at the 2024 CUCSA Region V games held in Tshwane, South Africa. The women’s team won 3-0 against Botswana in their final while the men’s team defeated Zimbabwe 4-0 in their final.

=== Rugby 7's ===
In 2012 the men's rugby 7's team were second after losing to Great Britain 35-17 at the 5th FISU WUC Rugby Sevens held in Brive, France.

In 2018 the men's rugby 7's team were crowned FISU World University Championship Rugby Sevens champions after defeating Australia 24-12 in the final held in Swakopmund, Namibia. The women's team were fourth after losing their bronze match 17-0 to Belgium.

At the Rugby sevens at the 2019 Summer Universiade the men's rugby 7's team won the silver medal going down 15-12 to Japan.

== Basketball ==
=== Men's ===
| Year | Winner | Runners-up | Ref |
|---|---|---|---|
| 2019 | University of Johannesburg | University of KwaZulu- Natal | |
| 2021 | University of the Witwatersrand | University of Johannesburg | |
| 2022 | | | |
| 2023 | University of Johannesburg | Tshwane University of Technology | |

=== Women's ===
| Year | Winner | Runners-up | Ref |
|---|---|---|---|
| 2021 | Vaal University of Technology | University of Pretoria | |
| 2022 | Vaal University of Technology | University of Pretoria | |
| 2023 | | | |

== Basketball 3x3 ==
=== Men's ===
| Year | Winner | Runners-up | Ref |
|---|---|---|---|
| 2021 | | | |
| 2022 | | | |
| 2023 | University of Johannesburg | University of Pretoria | |

=== Women's ===
| Year | Winner | Runners-up | Ref |
|---|---|---|---|
| 2021 | | | |
| 2022 | University of Johannesburg | University of the Western Cape | |
| 2023 | University of Pretoria | University of Johannesburg | |

== Field hockey ==
=== Men's ===
| Year | Winner | Runners-up | Ref |
|---|---|---|---|
| 2017 | University of Johannesburg | NMU Madibaz | |
| 2018 | UCT Ikey Rangers | Maties | |
| 2020 | Event cancelled due to COVID-19 in South Africa | | |
| 2019 | Wits | Maties | |
| 2021 | UP Tuks | Varsity College | |
| 2022 | Maties | UP Tuks | |
| 2023 | UP Tuks | Maties | |
| 2024 | UP Tuks | Maties | |
| 2025 | UP Tuks | Maties | |
| 2026 | Maties | UP Tuks | |

=== Women's ===
| Year | Winner | Runners-up | Ref |
|---|---|---|---|
| 2017 | UP Tuks | University of Johannesburg | |
| 2018 | UP Tuks | Maties | |
| 2019 | UP Tuks | NWU Pukke | |
| 2020 | Event cancelled due to COVID-19 in South Africa | | |
| 2021 | UP Tuks | Maties | |
| 2022 | Maties | UP Tuks | |
| 2023 | Maties | NWU Pukke | |
| 2024 | UP Tuks | NWU Pukke | |
| 2025 | Maties | NWU Pukke | |
| 2026 | UP Tuks | Maties | |

== Soccer ==
=== Women's ===
Previous winners and runners-up:

| Year | Champions | Runners-up |
|---|---|---|
| 2018 | University of Johannesburg | |
| 2019 | University of Johannesburg | |
| 2020 | Event cancelled due to COVID-19 in South Africa | |
| 2021 | Event cancelled due to COVID-19 in South Africa | |
| 2022 | University of Johannesburg | University of Pretoria |
| 2023 | University of Pretoria | University of the Western Cape |
| 2024 | University of the Western Cape | University of Johannesburg |
| 2025 | University of Johannesburg | Tshwane University of Technology |

=== Men's ===
| Year | Champions | Runners-up |
|---|---|---|
| 2022 | University of Johannesburg | Tshwane University of Technology |
| 2023 | University of Pretoria | University of the Free State |
| 2024 | University of Pretoria | University of the Western Cape |
| 2025 | University of Pretoria | Tshwane University of Technology |

== Leagues, competitions and events ==
=== FISU events organised ===
World University Championship:

- 7th WUC Golf - San Lameer - 1998
- 12th WUC Golf - Sun City - 2008
- 2012 FISU WUC Netball - Cape Town

=== All-Africa University Games ===
- IV - Tshwane
- VIII - Johannesburg
