= Witwatersrand University Women's F.C. =

Wits University Ladies F.C.
- Full name: Witwatersrand University Ladies Football Club
- Nickname: Educated Footballers
- Ground: Wits Sturrock Park
- Capacity: 5000
- Coordinates: 26.1876° S, 28.0312° E
- Head coach: (South Africa) Jabulile Baloyi
- League: Sasol Women's League
- 2024: 3rd (Gauteng Stream B)
- Website: https://www.wits.ac.za/sport/clubs/football-soccer/

The Witwatersrand University Women's Football Club, also known as Wits Ladies F.C. or Wits University Ladies, is the football club representing the University of the Witwatersrand based in Johannesburg, Gauteng. The senior team competes in the Sasol Women's League, the second tier women's football league in South Africa.

== History ==
In 2017, they won the Johannesburg Regional Women's League. The win granted them entry into the 2017 SAFA Gauteng Regional Women's Championship. Only the top two sides at the championship advance to Gauteng stream of the second tier Sasol Women's League. Wits Ladies finished third missing out on second place on goal difference after being tied with Rosina Sedibane.

In 2019 they finished in third place at the USSA championship and qualified for the Women's Varsity Football tournament.

In 2021, they recorded they biggest win against Lusaka Ladies when they won 13-0 in the Sasol Women's League.

=== U/21 team ===
In 2024, they were fourth in the 2024 Pirates Cup (Women) tournament hosted by Orlando Pirates.

In 2025 they were third in the Pirates Cup.

== Honours ==
- Johannesburg Regional Women's League: 2017
- Pirates Cup (Women): third: 2025, fourth place: 2024
- USSA: third: 2019
