= Tshwane University of Technology Women's F.C. =

TUT Matsatsantsa Ladies F.C.
- Full name: Tshwane University of Technology Women's Football Club.
- Nicknames: Red Machine; The Red Army
- Ground: TUT Stadium
- Capacity: 2500
- Coordinates: 25.7345°S 28.1605°E
- Owner: Tshwane University of Technology
- Head Coach: (South Africa) Christianah Kutumela
- League: SAFA Women's League
- 2025: 6th

The Tshwane University of Technology Women's Football Club, also knowns as TUT Ladies or TUT Matsatsantsa Ladies, is the football club representing the Tshwane University of Technology based in Pretoria, Gauteng. The senior team competes in the SAFA Women's League, the top tier women's football league in South Africa.

In 2018 they became the first university of win a national league when they won the 2018 Sasol League National Championship.

== History ==
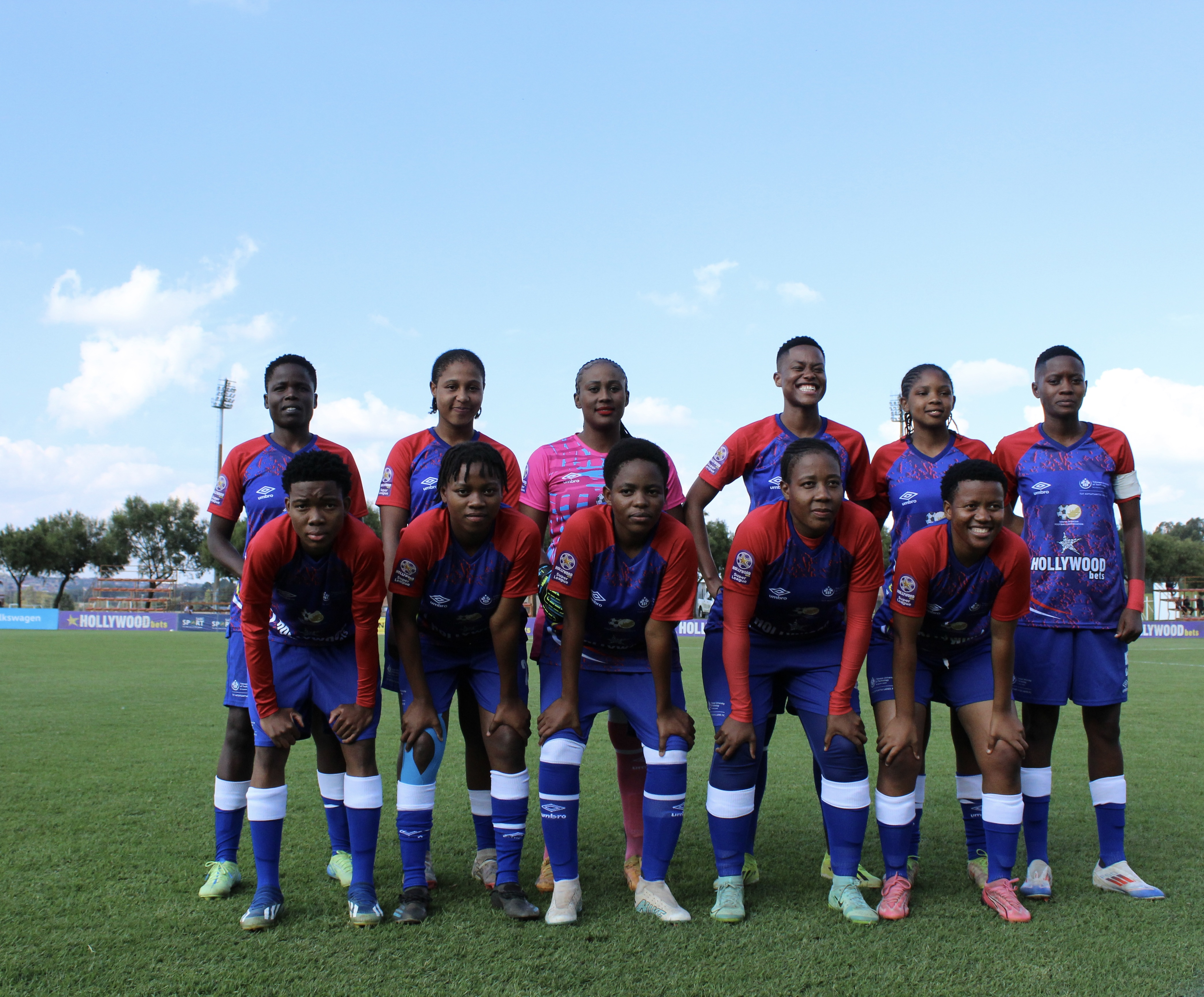
TUT Matsatsantsa Ladies in 2025

In 2013 they defeated Vaal University of Technology 5–1 to win their maiden USSA Gauteng title.

In 2019 they were crowned champions of the inaugural Thembi Kgatlana Tournament.

=== Women's Varsity Football ===
In 2018 they won their fifth consecutive Women's Varsity Football title. In 2019 they won their sixth consecutive title. They were runners-up in 2024 edition after being defeated by UWC 2–1 in the final.

=== Sasol League National Championship ===
In 2018 they won their maiden Sasol League National Championship and became the first university of win the national title.

=== SAFA Women's League ===
They were runners-up in the inaugural SAFA Women's League and the 2021 edition.

In 2023, they partnered with SuperSport United to form TUT Matsatsantsa. This partnership allows SuperSport United to have a women's division.

== Sponsorship ==
For the 2022/23 season they announced a deal with Montflair sportswear.

== Notable players ==
=== FIFA World Cup participants ===
List of players that were called up for a FIFA Women's World Cup while playing for the university. In brackets, the tournament played:

- (South Africa) Busisiwe Ndimeni (2019)

Players who have received a Banyana Banyana call up while playing for the university:

- Hildah Magaia
- Refiloe Jane
- Tshogofatso Motlogelwa
- Sibongile Ntoane

== Honours ==
- SAFA Women's League: Runners-up: 2019-20, 2021
- Sasol League National Championship: 2018
- Women's Varsity Football: 2014, 2015, 2016, 2017, 2018, 2019, Runners-up: 2013, 2024

=== SAFA Women's League record ===
Season	Pos	Record							
Season	Pos	P	W	D	L	F	A	GD	Pst
2019-20	Runners Up	22	17	4	1	83	26	57	55
2021	Runners Up	26	18	5	3	58	21	37	59
2022	Third place	30	19	8	3	75	33	42	65
2023	10th place	30	11	3	16	34	34	0	36
2024	11th place	30	10	5	15	44	53	(9)	35
2025	6th place	30	13	5	12	37	40	(3)	44

- Orange = In progress
- Gold = Champions
- Silver = Runner up

==== SAFA Women's League statistics ====
- Record number of games won in a season: 19 games (2022)
- Record number of points in a season: 65 points (2022)
- Record goals scored in a season: 75 goals (2022)
- Record for lowest number of goals conceded in a season: 21 goals (2021)
- Record for lowest number of defeats in a season: 1 game (2019-20)
