= University of Pretoria Women's F.C. =

Tuks Ladies F.C.
- Full name: University of Pretoria Women's Football Club
- Nickname: "AmaTuks" "Tuks"
- Ground: Tuks Stadium, Hatfield, Pretoria
- Capacity: 12,000
- Owner: University of Pretoria
- Head Coach: (South Africa) Maude Khumalo
- League: SAFA Women's League
- 2025: 9th
Home colours	Away colours

The University of Pretoria Women's Football Club, also UP-Tuks Ladies F.C. or Tuks Ladies F.C., is the football club representing the University of Pretoria based in Hatfield, Gauteng. The senior team competes in the SAFA Women's League, the top tier women's football league in South Africa.

== History ==
At the 2022 Sasol League National Championship, they topped group A to secure a spot in the semi finals. They won 4–2 on penalties in the semi-final against Lindelani Ladies after the match ended in a 1–1 draw. This win promoted them to the SAFA Women's League. In the final against Copperbelt Ladies, they lost 3–2 on penalties after the match ended in a 1-all draw.

== U/21 squad ==
The junior team won the inaugural women's Pirates Cup, following a 2–1 victory over UJ Ladies.

== Notable players ==
=== FIFA World Cup participants ===
List of players that were called up for a FIFA Women's World Cup while playing for the university. In brackets, the tournament played:

- (South Africa) Mapaseka Mpuru (2019)
- (South Africa) Wendy Shongwe (2023)

== Honours and tournament history ==
- Sasol League National Championship: runner-up: 2022
- Pirates Cup: 2023

=== SAFA Women's League record ===
Season	Pos	Record							
Season	Pos	P	W	D	L	F	A	GD	Pst
2023	6th place	30	16	4	10	54	34	20	52
2024	8th place	30	11	9	10	39	45	(6)	42
2025	9th place	30	10	8	12	37	46	(9)	38

- Orange = In progress
- Gold = Champions
- Silver = Runner up

==== SAFA Women's League statistics ====
- Record number of games won in a season: 16 games (2023)
- Record number of points in a season: 52 points (2023)
- Record goals scored in a season: 54 goals (2023)
- Record for lowest number of goals conceded in a season: 34 goals (2023)
- Record for lowest number of defeats in a season: 10 games (2023 and 2024)
