= CAF Women's Champions League UNIFFAC Qualifiers =

UNIFFAC Women's Champions League
- Organiser(s): UNIFFAC
- Founded: 2021; 5 years ago
- Region: Central Africa
- Teams: 5
- Current champions: (Cameroon) Lekié FF (1st title)
- Most championships: (Democratic Republic of the Congo) TP Mazembe (2 titles)
- Broadcaster: CAF TV
- 2026 edition

The CAF Women's Champions League UNIFFAC Qualifiers, branded as the UNIFFAC Women's Champions League, is an annual qualification tournament for the CAF Women's Champions League organized by UNIFFAC for its nations.

== History ==
In 2020, CAF announced the launch of the CAF Women's Champions League with each of the six sub confederations to hold qualifiers with the winners to represent them at the main tournament.

== Results ==
Season	Champions	Runners-up	Ref.
2021	(Equatorial Guinea) Malabo Kings F.C.	(Democratic Republic of the Congo) FCF Amani	
2022	(Democratic Republic of the Congo) TP Mazembe	(Cameroon) AS Awa	
2023	(Equatorial Guinea) Huracanes	(Democratic Republic of the Congo) TP Mazembe	
2024	(Democratic Republic of the Congo) TP Mazembe	(Cameroon) Lekié FF	
2025	(Equatorial Guinea) 15 de Agosto Femenino	(Cameroon) FC Ebolowa	
2026	(Cameroon) Lekié FF	(Equatorial Guinea) 15 de Agosto Femenino	

== Records and statistics ==
Tournament	Golden Boot	Goals	Ref
2021	(Ivory Coast) Stéphanie Gbogou	4	
2022	(Democratic Republic of the Congo) Merveille Kanjinga	4	
2023	(Equatorial Guinea) Elena Obono	5	
2024	(Democratic Republic of the Congo) Esther Dikisha	4	
2025	(Equatorial Guinea) Ana María Nchama	8	
2026	(Cameroon) Brenda Tabe	4	

=== Performance by nation ===
Nation	Winners	Runners-up	3rd Places	4th places	Winner	Runners-up	3rd Place	4th place
Equatorial Guinea	3	1	1	0	Malabo Kings (1); Huracanes (1); 15 de Agosto Femenino (1)	15 de Agosto Femenino (1)	Atlético Malabo (1)	
DR Congo	2	2	2	0	TP Mazembe (2)	FCF Amani (1); TP Mazembe (1)	FA Msichana (2)	
Cameroon	1	3	0	0	Lekié FF (1)	AS Awa (1); Lekié FF (1); FC Ebolowa (1)		
Congo	0	0	1	3			AS Epah-Ngamba (1)	CSM Diables Noirs (1); AC Colombe (2)
