= 2018 Women's Africa Cup of Nations squads =

Below is a list of squads used in the 2018 Africa Women Cup of Nations. The squad listings were announced on 16 November 2018.

== Group A ==
=== Ghana ===
Ghana named their squad on 11 November 2018.

Head coach: Bashir Hayford

No.	Pos.	Player	Date of birth (age)	Club
1	GK	Fafali Dumehasi	25 December 1993 (aged 24)	(Ghana Football Association) Police FC
16	GK	Nana Ama Asantewaa	28 December 1993 (aged 24)	(Ghana Football Association) Police FC
21	GK	Patricia Mantey	27 September 1992 (aged 26)	(Ghana Football Association) Immigration Ladies
2	DF	Gladys Amfobea	1 July 1998 (aged 20)	(Ghana Football Association) Lady Strikers
3	DF	Linda Eshun	5 August 1992 (aged 26)	(Football Association of Iceland) Víkingur Ólafsvík
4	DF	Janet Egyir	7 May 1992 (aged 26)	(Ghana Football Association) Hasaacas Ladies
5	DF	Grace Asantewaa	5 December 2000 (aged 17)	(Ghana Football Association) Ampem Darkoa
6	DF	Ellen Coleman	11 December 1995 (aged 22)	(Ghana Football Association) Lady Strikers
11	DF	Cynthia Adobea	1 September 1990 (aged 28)	(Ghana Football Association) Prisons
15	DF	Faustina Ampah	30 November 1996 (aged 21)	(Football Federation of Belarus) FC Minsk
19	DF	Philicity Asuako	25 December 1999 (aged 18)	(Ghana Football Association) Police FC
7	MF	Sherifatu Sumaila	30 November 1996 (aged 21)	(United States Soccer Federation) LA Galaxy OC
8	MF	Juliet Acheampong	11 July 1991 (aged 27)	(Ghana Football Association) Prisons
10	MF	Elizabeth Addo	1 September 1993 (aged 25)	(United States Soccer Federation) Seattle Reign FC
12	MF	Alice Kusi	12 January 1995 (aged 23)	(Lebanese Football Association) Zouk Mosbeh
13	MF	Mary Essiful	22 June 1993 (aged 25)	(Ghana Football Association) Soccer Intellectuals
14	MF	Priscilla Okyere	6 June 1995 (aged 23)	(Ghana Football Association) Ampem Darkoa
17	MF	Portia Boakye	17 April 1989 (aged 29)	(Swedish Football Association) Djurgårdens IF
20	MF	Lily Niber-Lawrence	23 June 1997 (aged 21)	(Ghana Football Association) Hasaacas Ladies
9	FW	Samira Suleman	16 August 1991 (aged 27)	(Football Association of Iceland) Víkingur Ólafsvík
18	FW	Jane Ayiyem	19 October 1997 (aged 21)	(Ghana Football Association) Police FC

=== Algeria ===
Head coach: Radia Fertoul

No.	Pos.	Player	Date of birth (age)	Club
1	GK	Kahina Takenint	21 May 1991 (aged 27)	(Algerian Football Federation) AS Sûreté Nationale
16	GK	Nadjet Fedoul	28 October 1981 (aged 37)	(Algerian Football Federation) ASE Alger Centre
2	DF	Isma Ouadah	19 January 1983 (aged 35)	(Algerian Football Federation) AS Sûreté Nationale
3	DF	Habiba Sadou	1 November 1986 (aged 32)	(Algerian Football Federation) AS Sûreté Nationale
4	DF	Fatima Sekouane	21 May 1983 (aged 35)	(Algerian Football Federation) FC Constantine
5	DF	Fatima Bara	21 February 1990 (aged 28)	(Algerian Football Federation) ASE Alger Centre
12	DF	Morgane Belkhiter	23 November 1995 (aged 22)	(French Football Federation) Olympique de Marseille
13	DF	Chahrazed Bensekrane	7 April 1992 (aged 26)	(Algerian Football Federation) AS Sûreté Nationale
14	DF	Myriam Yasmine Benlazar	9 June 1995 (aged 23)	(French Football Federation) Toulouse
15	DF	Fethia Bekhedda	9 July 1990 (aged 28)	(Algerian Football Federation) JF Khroub
19	DF	Zeyneb Kandouci	16 March 1994 (aged 24)	(Algerian Football Federation) JF Khroub
21	DF	Fatima Beladgham	10 February 1994 (aged 24)	(Algerian Football Federation) FC Constantine
6	MF	Lydia Belkacemi	2 March 1994 (aged 24)	(French Football Federation) Stade Brestois 29
8	MF	Lina Khelif	27 January 1997 (aged 21)	(French Football Federation) Croix de Savoie Ambilly
18	MF	Imane Chebel	25 March 1995 (aged 23)	(Canadian Soccer Association) Concordia University
20	MF	Assia Sidhoum	25 December 1996 (aged 21)	(French Football Federation) ASPTT Albi
7	FW	Amina Chahinez Hemour	4 August 1983 (aged 35)	(Algerian Football Federation) ASE Alger Centre
9	FW	Djamila Marek	8 May 1980 (aged 38)	(Algerian Football Federation) ASE Alger Centre
10	FW	Imene Merrouche	25 April 1994 (aged 24)	(Algerian Football Federation) FC Constantine
11	FW	Inès Boutaleb	8 November 1998 (aged 20)	(French Football Federation) Croix de Savoie Ambilly
17	FW	Madina Ramdani	13 May 1991 (aged 27)	(Algerian Football Federation) AS Sûreté Nationale

=== Mali ===
Mali named their squad on 14 November 2018.

Head coach: Houssein Saloum

No.	Pos.	Player	Date of birth (age)	Club
1	GK	Adoudou Konaté	14 April 1994 (aged 24)	(Malian Football Federation) Super Lionnes
16	GK	Goundo Samaké	2 May 1992 (aged 26)	Unattached
21	GK	Hawa Keïta	19 February 1996 (aged 22)	(Malian Football Federation) AS Police de Bamako
2	DF	Coulouba Sogore	3 June 1997 (aged 21)	(Malian Football Federation) AS Real Bamako
3	DF	Kani Konté	13 April 1989 (aged 29)	(French Football Federation) VGA Saint-Maur
4	DF	Aminata Doucouré	3 April 1994 (aged 24)	(French Football Federation) RC Saint-Denis
13	DF	Aïssatou Diadhiou	8 September 1991 (aged 27)	(French Football Federation) ES 16
6	MF	Fatoumata Doumbia	10 February 1986 (aged 32)	(Malian Football Federation) AS Mandé
8	MF	Yakare Niakate	12 January 1997 (aged 21)	(French Football Federation) Stade Brestois 29
10	MF	Binta Diarra	15 December 1994 (aged 23)	(Malian Football Federation) AS Mandé
11	MF	Salimata Diarra	24 October 1994 (aged 24)	(Malian Football Federation) AS Mandé
12	MF	Lala Dicko	21 June 1991 (aged 27)	(Malian Football Federation) AS Real Bamako
14	MF	Aissata Traoré	9 July 1997 (aged 21)	(Malian Football Federation) Super Lionnes
15	MF	Bintou Koité	20 November 1995 (aged 22)	(Malian Football Federation) AS Mandé
18	MF	Djenaba Baradji	16 December 1995 (aged 22)	(French Football Federation) RC Saint-Denis
5	FW	Sebe Coulibaly	9 February 1994 (aged 24)	(French Football Federation) RC Saint-Denis
7	FW	Fatoumata Diarra	15 April 1986 (aged 32)	(Malian Football Federation) AS Mandé
9	FW	Bassira Touré	6 January 1990 (aged 28)	(Malian Football Federation) AS Mandé
17	FW	Hawa Tangara	12 January 1993 (aged 25)	(Malian Football Federation) AS Real Bamako
19	FW	Agueicha Diarra	30 July 1998 (aged 20)	(Malian Football Federation) Super Lionnes
20	FW	Maimouna Traoré	1 January 1998 (aged 20)	(Malian Football Federation) AS Police de Bamako

=== Cameroon ===
Cameroon named their squad on 9 November 2018.

Head coach: Joseph Ndoko

No.	Pos.	Player	Date of birth (age)	Club
1	GK	Annette Ngo Ndom	2 June 1985 (aged 33)	(Cameroonian Football Federation) Amazone FAP
16	GK	Diane Ndeme	9 June 1990 (aged 28)	(Cameroonian Football Federation) Caïman Douala
21	GK	Marthe Ongmahan	12 June 1992 (aged 26)	(Cameroonian Football Federation) AWA FC
2	DF	Christine Manie	4 May 1984 (aged 34)	(French Football Federation) AS Nancy
4	DF	Yvonne Leuko	20 November 1991 (aged 26)	(French Football Federation) Strasbourg
5	DF	Augustine Ejangue	19 January 1989 (aged 29)	(Royal Spanish Football Federation) Santa Teresa
11	DF	Aurelle Awona	2 February 1993 (aged 25)	(French Football Federation) Dijon FCO
12	DF	Claudine Meffometou	1 July 1990 (aged 28)	(French Football Federation) Guingamp
6	MF	Francine Zouga	9 November 1987 (aged 31)	(French Football Federation) AS Nancy
8	MF	Raissa Feudjio	29 October 1995 (aged 23)	(Football Association of Finland) Åland United
10	MF	Jeannette Yango	12 June 1993 (aged 25)	(French Football Federation) US Saint-Malo
13	MF	Charlène Menene	19 November 1998 (aged 19)	(Cameroonian Football Federation) Louves Minproff
14	MF	Ninon Abena	5 September 1994 (aged 24)	(Cameroonian Football Federation) Louves Minproff
19	MF	Marlyse Ngo Ndoumbouk	3 January 1985 (aged 33)	(French Football Federation) AS Nancy
20	MF	Genevieve Ngo	10 March 1993 (aged 25)	(Royal Spanish Football Federation) Recreativo de Huelva
3	FW	Ajara Nchout	12 January 1993 (aged 25)	(Norwegian Football Federation) IL Sandviken
7	FW	Gabrielle Onguéné	25 February 1989 (aged 29)	(Russian Football Union) ZFK CSKA Moscow
9	FW	Madeleine Ngono Mani	16 October 1983 (aged 35)	(French Football Federation) Albi Crois de Savoie
15	FW	Michaela Abam	12 June 1997 (aged 21)	(French Football Federation) Paris FC
17	FW	Gaëlle Enganamouit	9 June 1992 (aged 26)	(Norwegian Football Federation) Avaldsnes IL
18	FW	Henriette Akaba	7 June 1992 (aged 26)	(Turkish Football Federation) Beşiktaş

== Group B ==
=== Nigeria ===
Nigeria named their squad on 9 November 2018.

Head coach: (Sweden) Thomas Dennerby

No.	Pos.	Player	Date of birth (age)	Club
1	GK	Tochukwu Oluehi	2 May 1987 (aged 31)	(Nigeria Football Federation) Rivers Angels F.C.
16	GK	Chiamaka Nnadozie	8 December 2000 (aged 17)	(Nigeria Football Federation) Rivers Angels F.C.
21	GK	Christy Ohiaeriaku	13 December 1996 (aged 21)	(Nigeria Football Federation) Confluence Queens
2	DF	Glory Ogbonna	25 December 1998 (aged 19)	(Nigeria Football Federation) Ibom Angels
3	DF	Osinachi Ohale	21 December 1991 (aged 26)	(Swedish Football Association) Vittsjö GIK
4	DF	Ngozi Ebere	5 August 1991 (aged 27)	(Cyprus Football Association) Barcelona FA
5	DF	Onome Ebi	8 May 1983 (aged 35)	(Chinese Football Association) Henan Huishang
6	DF	Josephine Chukwunonye	19 March 1992 (aged 26)	(Swedish Football Association) Asarums IF
14	DF	Faith Ikidi	28 February 1987 (aged 31)	(Swedish Football Association) Piteå IF
10	MF	Rita Chikwelu	6 March 1988 (aged 30)	(Swedish Football Association) Kristianstads DFF
12	MF	Amarachi Okoronkwo	12 December 1992 (aged 25)	(Nigeria Football Federation) Nasarawa Amazons
13	MF	Ngozi Okobi	14 December 1993 (aged 24)	(Swedish Football Association) Eskilstuna United DFF
18	MF	Halimatu Ayinde	16 May 1995 (aged 23)	(Swedish Football Association) Asarums IF
20	MF	Sarah Nnodim	25 December 1995 (aged 22)	(Nigeria Football Federation) Nasarawa Amazons
7	FW	Anam Imo	30 November 2000 (aged 17)	(Nigeria Football Federation) Nasarawa Amazons
8	FW	Asisat Oshoala	9 October 1994 (aged 24)	(Chinese Football Association) Dalian Quanjian F.C.
9	FW	Desire Oparanozie	17 December 1993 (aged 24)	(French Football Federation) Guingamp
11	FW	Chinaza Uchendu	3 December 1997 (aged 20)	(Portuguese Football Federation) Braga
15	FW	Rasheedat Ajibade	8 December 1999 (aged 18)	(Nigeria Football Federation) FC Robo
17	FW	Francisca Ordega	19 October 1993 (aged 25)	(United States Soccer Federation) Washington Spirit
19	FW	Chinwendu Ihezuo	30 April 1997 (aged 21)	(Kazakhstan Football Federation) BIIK Kazygurt

=== South Africa ===
South Africa named their squad on 7 November 2018.

Head coach: Desiree Ellis

No.	Pos.	Player	Date of birth (age)	Club
1	GK	Roxanne Barker	6 May 1991 (aged 27)	(South African Football Association) UWC Ladies
16	GK	Andile Dlamini	2 September 1992 (aged 26)	(South African Football Association) Mamelodi Sundowns Ladies
20	GK	Kaylin Swart	30 September 1994 (aged 24)	(United States Soccer Federation) Menlo Oaks
2	DF	Lebogang Ramalepe	3 December 1991 (aged 26)	(South African Football Association) Ma-Indies Ladies
3	DF	Nothando Vilakazi	28 October 1988 (aged 30)	(South African Football Association) Palace Super Falcons
4	DF	Noko Matlou	30 September 1985 (aged 33)	(South African Football Association) Ma-Indies Ladies
5	DF	Janine van Wyk	17 April 1987 (aged 31)	(United States Soccer Federation) Houston Dash
7	DF	Koketso Tlailane	7 December 1992 (aged 25)	(South African Football Association) Tshwane University of Technology
13	DF	Bambanani Mbane	12 March 1990 (aged 28)	(South African Football Association) Bloemfontein Celtic Ladies
19	DF	Tiisetso Makhubela	24 April 1997 (aged 21)	(South African Football Association) Mamelodi Sundowns Ladies
6	MF	Mamello Makhabane	24 February 1988 (aged 30)	(South African Football Association) JVW F.C.
8	MF	Kgalebane Mohlakoana	10 December 1993 (aged 24)	(South African Football Association) Bloemfontein Celtic Ladies
10	MF	Linda Motlhalo	1 July 1998 (aged 20)	(United States Soccer Federation) Houston Dash
15	MF	Refiloe Jane	4 August 1992 (aged 26)	(Football Australia) Canberra United FC
17	MF	Leandra Smeda	22 July 1989 (aged 29)	(Lithuanian Football Federation) Gintra Universitetas
18	MF	Mpumi Nyandeni	19 August 1987 (aged 31)	(South African Football Association) JVW F.C.
21	MF	Busisiwe Ndimeni	25 June 1991 (aged 27)	(South African Football Association) Tshwane University of Technology
9	FW	Amanda Mthandi	23 May 1996 (aged 22)	(South African Football Association) University of Johannesburg
11	FW	Thembi Kgatlana	2 May 1996 (aged 22)	(United States Soccer Federation) Houston Dash
12	FW	Jermaine Seoposenwe	12 October 1993 (aged 25)	(South African Football Association) JVW F.C.
14	FW	Melinda Kgadiete	21 July 1992 (aged 26)	(South African Football Association) Bloemfontein Celtic Ladies

=== Zambia ===
Zambia named their squad on 6 November 2018.

Head coach: Bruce Mwape

No.	Pos.	Player	Date of birth (age)	Club
1	GK	Catherine Musonda	20 February 1998 (aged 20)	(Football Association of Zambia) ZESCO United
16	GK	Hazel Nali	4 April 1998 (aged 20)	(Football Association of Zambia) Green Buffaloes
18	GK	Chiko Nkhoma	27 December 1996 (aged 21)	(Football Association of Zambia) Red Arrows F.C.
2	DF	Grace Zulu	3 June 1995 (aged 23)	(Football Association of Zambia) Indeni Roses
4	DF	Judith Zulu	11 September 1997 (aged 21)	(Football Association of Zambia) Green Buffaloes
5	DF	Anita Mulenga	3 May 1995 (aged 23)	(Football Association of Zambia) Green Buffaloes
15	DF	Agness Musase	11 July 1997 (aged 21)	(Football Association of Zambia) Green Buffaloes
19	DF	Vast Phiri	3 February 1996 (aged 22)	(Football Association of Zambia) ZESCO United
20	DF	Jacqueline Nkole	5 August 1998 (aged 20)	(Football Association of Zambia) Indeni Roses
3	MF	Lushomo Mweemba	10 April 2001 (aged 17)	(Football Association of Zambia) Nkwazi
6	MF	Hellen Mubanga	23 May 1995 (aged 23)	(Football Association of Zambia) Red Arrows F.C.
7	MF	Lubandji Ochumba	1 July 2001 (aged 17)	(Football Association of Zambia) Nkwazi
8	MF	Margaret Belemu	24 February 1997 (aged 21)	(Football Association of Zambia) Red Arrows F.C.
10	MF	Grace Chanda	11 June 1997 (aged 21)	(Football Association of Zambia) ZESCO United
11	MF	Barbra Banda	20 March 2000 (aged 18)	(Royal Spanish Football Federation) EDF Logroño
12	MF	Ireen Lungu	6 October 1997 (aged 21)	(Football Association of Zambia) Green Buffaloes
13	MF	Martha Tembo	8 March 1998 (aged 20)	(Football Association of Zambia) Green Buffaloes
17	MF	Mary Mwakapila	5 June 1995 (aged 23)	(Football Association of Zambia) Green Buffaloes
9	FW	Racheal Kundananji	3 June 2000 (aged 18)	(Football Association of Zambia) Indeni Roses
14	FW	Hellen Chanda	19 June 1998 (aged 20)	(Football Association of Zambia) Red Arrows F.C.
21	FW	Avell Chitundu	30 July 1997 (aged 21)	(Football Association of Zambia) ZESCO United

=== Equatorial Guinea ===
Head coach: (Republic of the Congo) Jean-Paul Mpila

No.	Pos.	Player	Date of birth (age)	Club
1	GK	Lucrecia Boabaila	26 March 1998 (aged 20)	(Equatoguinean Football Federation) Estrella de Rebola
13	GK	Emiliana Ndong	24 October 1986 (aged 32)	(Equatoguinean Football Federation) Deportivo de Evinayong
18	GK	Dolores Masongo	24 October 2001 (aged 17)	(Equatoguinean Football Federation) Super Leonas
2	DF	Avelina Ndong	8 December 2003 (aged 14)	(Equatoguinean Football Federation) Leones Vegetarianos
3	DF	Ghyslaine Nke	8 June 1989 (aged 29)	(Equatoguinean Football Federation) Estrellas de Ewaiso Pola
4	DF	Esperanza Mbang	22 October 1989 (aged 29)	(Equatoguinean Football Federation) Leones Vegetarianos
9	DF	Dorine Chuigoué	28 November 1988 (aged 29)	(Royal Spanish Football Federation) EDF Logroño
19	DF	Cecilia Akeng	8 November 2002 (aged 16)	(Equatoguinean Football Federation) Deportivo de Evinayong
5	MF	Annette Jacky Messomo	1 March 1993 (aged 25)	(United States Soccer Federation) Dallas Spurs
7	MF	Blessing Diala	8 December 1989 (aged 28)	(Equatoguinean Football Federation) Super Leonas
12	MF	Celestina Besecu	12 September 2002 (aged 16)	(Equatoguinean Football Federation) Super Leonas
14	MF	Ramona Mibuy Ndong	28 June 2002 (aged 16)	(Equatoguinean Football Federation) Leones Vegetarianos
16	MF	Catalina Engonga	14 July 1991 (aged 27)	(Equatoguinean Football Federation) Deportivo de Evinayong
17	MF	Diana Bilelo	3 March 2002 (aged 16)	(Equatoguinean Football Federation) Atlético Malabo
20	MF	Christelle Nyepel	16 January 1995 (aged 23)	(Equatoguinean Football Federation) Estrellas de Ewaiso Pola
21	MF	Elena Obono	13 November 1999 (aged 19)	(Equatoguinean Football Federation) Estrellas de Ewaiso Pola
6	FW	Jade Boho (Note: Did not attend. Instead, she remained playing matches for her club, EDF Logroño.)	30 August 1986 (aged 32)	(Royal Spanish Football Federation) EDF Logroño
8	FW	Berta Ochaga	7 November 2005 (aged 13)	(Equatoguinean Football Federation) Atlético Malabo
10	FW	Genoveva Añonma	19 April 1989 (aged 29)	(Equatoguinean Football Federation) Leones Vegetarianos
11	FW	Luz Milagrosa Obono	7 April 1996 (aged 22)	(Equatoguinean Football Federation) Leones Vegetarianos
15	FW	Gloria Chinasa	8 December 1987 (aged 30)	(Equatoguinean Football Federation) Estrellas de Ewaiso Pola
