= 2023 CAF Women's Champions League final =

Final of the 2023 CAF Women's Champions League

- Match programme cover
- Event: 2023 CAF Women's Champions League
Mamelodi Sundowns	SC Casablanca
(South Africa)	(Morocco)
3	0
- Date: 19 November 2023
- Venue: Amadou Gon Coulibaly Stadium, Korhogo
- Player of the Match: Boitumelo Rabale (Mamelodi Sundowns)
- Referee: Suavis Iratunga (Burundi)
- Attendance: 20,000

The 2023 CAF Women's Champions League final is the final match of the 2023 CAF Women's Champions League, the third edition of Africa's premier women's club football tournament organised by CAF. It was played at Amadou Gon Coulibaly Stadium in Korhogo, Côte d'Ivoire on 19 November 2023

== Teams ==
Team	Zone	Previous finals appearances (bold indicates winners)
(South Africa) Mamelodi Sundowns	COSAFA (Southern Africa)	2 (**2021**, 2022)
(Morocco) SC Casablanca	UNAF (North Africa)	0

== Venue ==
The final of the third CAF Women's Champions League was played as a single match at a pre-selected venue by CAF, similar to the format used in the previous editions. The Amadou Gon Coulibaly Stadium in Korhogo, Côte d'Ivoire.

== Road to the final ==
(South Africa) Mamelodi Sundowns		Round	(Morocco) SC Casablanca	
Opponent	Result	**Qualifying rounds** Group stage	Opponent	Result
(Comoros) Olympic de Moroni	8–0	Matchday 1	(Algeria) Afak Relizane	4–3
(Eswatini) Young Buffaloes	4–0	Matchday 2	(Tunisia) ASF Sousse	3–1
(Mozambique) CD Costa do Sol	4–0	Matchday 3	(Egypt) Wadi Degla	6–1
**COSAFA - Group B winners**: Pos / Team / Pld / Pts; **1** / (South Africa) Mamelodi Sundowns (H) / **3** / **9**; 2 / (Mozambique) CD Costa do Sol / 3 / **6**; 3 / (Eswatini) Young Buffaloes / 3 / **1**; 4 / (Comoros) Olympic de Moroni / 3 / **1**; Source: (H) Hosts		Final standings	**UNAF - Final Group winners**: Pos / Team / Pld / Pts; **1** / (Morocco) SC Casablanca / **3** / **9**; 2 / (Algeria) Afak Relizane / 3 / **6**; 3 / (Egypt) Wadi Degla (H) / 3 / **3**; 4 / (Tunisia) ASF Sousse / 3 / **0**; Source: (H) Hosts	
Opponent	Result	**Qualifying rounds** Knockout stage		
(Zambia) Green Buffaloes	3–1	Semi-finals		
(Botswana) Double Action	2–0	Final		
Opponent	Result	**Final rounds** Group stage	Opponent	Result
(Tanzania) JKT Queens	2–0	Matchday 1	(Ivory Coast) Athlético Abidjan	1–0
(Morocco) SC Casablanca	1–0	Matchday 2	(South Africa) Mamelodi Sundowns	0–1
(Ivory Coast) Athlético Abidjan	3–0	Matchday 3	(Tanzania) JKT Queens	4–1
**Group A winners**: Pos / Team / Pld / Pts; **1** / (South Africa) Mamelodi Sundowns / **3** / **9**; 2 / (Morocco) SC Casablanca / 3 / **4**; 3 / (Tanzania) JKT Queens / 3 / **3**; 4 / (Ivory Coast) Athlético Abidjan (H) / 3 / **1**; Source: CAFOnline.com (H) Hosts		Final standings	**Group A runners-up**: Pos / Team / Pld / Pts; 1 / (South Africa) Mamelodi Sundowns / 3 / **9**; **2** / (Morocco) SC Casablanca / **3** / **4**; 3 / (Tanzania) JKT Queens / 3 / **3**; 4 / (Ivory Coast) Athlético Abidjan (H) / 3 / **1**; Source: CAFOnline.com (H) Hosts	
Opponent	Result	**Final rounds** Knockout stage	Opponent	Result
(Morocco) AS FAR	1–0	Semi-finals	(Ghana) Ampem Darkoa	2–2 (3–2 p)

== Match ==
19 November 2023
17:00

Mamelodi Sundowns (South Africa)	3–0	(Morocco) SC Casablanca
Tholakele 21' (pen.), 79'; Rabale 24'	Report

Amadou Gon Coulibaly Stadium, Korhogo
Attendance: 20,000
Referee: Suavis Iratunga (Burundi)

**Mamelodi Sundowns**	**SC Casablanca**

GK	1	(South Africa) Andile Dlamini
DF	3	(South Africa) Karabo Makhurubetshi
DF	4	(South Africa) Lebohang Ramalepe
RB	5	(South Africa) Zanele Nhlapho (c)
MF	6	(South Africa) Karabo Dhlamini
RM	8	(South Africa) Chuene Morifi		(substituted off) 90+2'
MF	10	(Lesotho) Boitumelo Rabale		(substituted off) 88'
MF	19	(South Africa) Kholosa Biyana	(yellow card) 45+1'	(substituted off) 46'
MF	21	(South Africa) Nonhlanhla Mthandi
RF	9	(Botswana) Refilwe Tholakele
CF	11	(South Africa) Melinda Kgadiete		(substituted off) 89'
Substitutes:
GK	2	(South Africa) Mbali Ntimane
GK	16	(Botswana) Sedilame Boseja
CB	18	(South Africa) Regina Keresi Mogolola
MF	7	(South Africa) Lehlogonolo Mashigo
MF	12	(South Africa) Malebogo Shawe
MF	13	(South Africa) Oratile Dikgosi Mokwena		(substituted on) 46'
FW	14	(South Africa) Miche Minnies
CM	15	(South Africa) Lerato Kgasago		(substituted on) 89'
MF	17	(South Africa) Andisiwe Mgcoyi		(substituted on) 88'
MF	20	(South Africa) Khunjulwa Mali		(substituted on) 90+2'
Manager:
(South Africa) Jerry Tshabalala

GK	21	(Morocco) Imane Abdelahad
RB	3	(Morocco) Laila Dahrouch
CB	8	(Mali) Aicha Samake	(yellow card) 19'
CB	13	(Morocco) Sara Abdelhakim		(substituted off) 68'
LB	10	(Ivory Coast) Nadège Koffi (c)	(yellow card) 45+3'
RM	14	(Morocco) Salma Miftah
CM	15	(Morocco) Meryem Hajri	(yellow card) 56'	(substituted off) 87'
LM	9	(Morocco) Chaymaa Mourtaji
RF	11	(Mali) Agueissa Diarra
CF	16	(Morocco) Salma Tammar
LF	18	(Ivory Coast) Adjoa Sylviane Kokora
Substitutes:
GK	1	(Morocco) Chaimae Chaouni
GK	12	(Morocco) Fatima Ezzahra Bambara
DF	2	(Morocco) Wissal El Assaoui
DF	5	(Morocco) Noura Boukar		(substituted on) 87'
DF	17	(Morocco) Hajar Balkassmi
DF	20	(Morocco) Chaimaa Kriem
MF	4	(Morocco) Chaimaa Idrissi Acherki
MF	7	(Morocco) Hajar Bouziani
MF	19	(Morocco) Salma Lahyani
FW	6	(Morocco) Samya Miftah		(substituted on) 68'
Manager:
(Morocco) Mehdi El Qaichouri

Player of the Match:
Boitumelo Rabale (Mamelodi Sundowns)

Assistant referees:
Fanta Koné (Mali)
Fidès Bangurambona (Burundi)
Fourth official:
Natacha Gérardine Konan (Côte d'Ivoire)
Reserve assistant referee:
...
Video assistant referee:
Salima Mukansanga (Rwanda)
1st Assistant video assistant referee:
Maria Rivet (Mauritius)
2nd Assistant video assistant referee:
Diana Chikotesha (Zambia)

**Match rules**

- 90 minutes.
- 30 minutes of extra time if necessary.
- Penalty shoot-out if scores still level.
- Twelve named substitutes.
- Maximum of three substitutions, with a fourth allowed in extra time.
