= 2026 CAF Women's Champions League UNIFFAC Qualifiers =

Tournament details
- Host country: Cameroon
- City: Yaoundé
- Dates: 29 August – 4 September
- Teams: 4 (from 4 associations)

Tournament statistics
- Matches played: 6
- Goals scored: 21 (3.5 per match)
- Top scorer: (Cameroon) Brenda Tabe (4 goals)
- All statistics correct as of 4 September 2026.

The 2025 CAF Women's Champions League UNIFFAC Qualifiers is the 5th edition of the CAF Women's Champions League UNIFFAC Qualifiers, an annual qualifying tournament for the CAF Women's Champions League organized by UNIFFAC for its member nations and will take place in Yaoundé, Cameroon from 29 August to 4 September 2026. The winners of this edition will secure their place in the 2026 CAF Women's Champions League, representing UNIFFAC on the continental stage.

== Participating teams ==
A total of four teams from four member associations will participate in the qualifying stage.

Team	Qualifying method	App.	Previous best performance
(Cameroon) Lekié FF	2026 Cameroonian Women's Championship champions	2nd	Runners-up (2024)
(Democratic Republic of the Congo) FA Msichana	2025 DR Congo women's football championship champions	2nd	Third place (2025)
(Republic of the Congo) AC Colombe	2025 Congolese Women's Championship champions	2nd	Fourth place (2025)
(Equatorial Guinea) FC 15 de Agosto	2025–26 Equatoguinean Primera División femenina champions	2nd	First place (2025)

== Match officials ==
Referees

- (Cameroon) Priscilla Ntui
- (Central African Republic) Leticia Kenga
- (Chad) Mami Dabacia
- (Republic of the Congo) Agnes Ngoma
- (Democratic Republic of the Congo) Greta Musimu
- (Equatorial Guinea) Concepción Mba Abegue
- (Gabon) Grâce Ondo

Assistant Referees

- (Cameroon) Rebecca Yeppe
- (Central African Republic) Barbara Kozerembi
- (Chad) Homadje Ndingadal
- (Republic of the Congo) Ornella Bouanga
- (Republic of the Congo) Marlène Ominga
- (Equatorial Guinea) Marta Mangue Ayang
- (Gabon) Florina Ndoue

== Qualifying tournament ==
Tiebreakers
Teams were ranked according to points (3 points for a win, 1 point for a draw, 0 points for a loss), and if tied on points, the following tiebreaking criteria were applied, in the order given, to determine the rankings:
1. Points in head-to-head matches among tied teams;
2. Goal difference in head-to-head matches among tied teams;
3. Goals scored in head-to-head matches among tied teams;
4. If more than two teams were tied, and after applying all head-to-head criteria above, a subset of teams were still tied, all head-to-head criteria above were reapplied exclusively to this subset of teams;
5. Goal difference in all group matches;
6. Goals scored in all group matches;
7. Disciplinary points (yellow card = 1 point, red card as a result of two yellow cards = 3 points, direct red card = 3 points, yellow card followed by direct red card = 4 points);
8. Drawing of lots.

Pos	Team	Pld	W	D	L	GF	GA	GD	Pts	Qualification
1	(Cameroon) Lekié FF (H)	3	1	2	0	8	1	+7	5	Final tournament
2	(Equatorial Guinea) 15 de Agosto Femenino	3	1	2	0	7	2	+5	5	
3	(Democratic Republic of the Congo) FA Msichana	3	1	2	0	3	2	+1	5	
4	(Republic of the Congo) AC Colombe	3	0	0	3	3	16	−13	0	

Source: UNIFFAC
Rules for classification: Tiebreakers
(H) Hosts
29 August 2026
13:00

Lekié FF (Cameroon)	1–1	(Equatorial Guinea) 15 de Agosto Femenino
Tabe 51'		Endale 90+5'

Ahmadou Ahidjo Stadium, Yaoundé
Referee: Agnes Ngoma (Congo)
29 August 2026
16:00

AC Colombe (Republic of the Congo)	2–3	(Democratic Republic of the Congo) FA Msichana
Nzeyi 17'; Mabonzo 37'		Boakye 51'; Kasaj 87'; Vukulu 89'

Ahmadou Ahidjo Stadium, Yaoundé
Referee: Priscilla Ntui (Cameroon)

1 September 2026
13:00

AC Colombe (Republic of the Congo)	0–7	(Cameroon) Lekié FF
		Mekuko 22', 54'; Zoua 24'; Tabe 35', 56', 75'; Ndjock 88' (pen.)

Ahmadou Ahidjo Stadium, Yaoundé
Referee: Greta Musimu (DR Congo)
1 September 2026
16:00

FA Msichana (Democratic Republic of the Congo)	0–0	(Equatorial Guinea) 15 de Agosto Femenino

Ahmadou Ahidjo Stadium, Yaoundé

4 September 2026

15 de Agosto Femenino (Equatorial Guinea)	6–1	(Republic of the Congo) AC Colombe
Ebenye 18'; Meva Nkola 20'; Obono 42'; Endale 45'; Mba Nchama 47'; Gbati 70'		Loulendo 82'

Ahmadou Ahidjo Stadium, Yaoundé
4 September 2026
15:30

Lekié FF (Cameroon)	0–0	(Democratic Republic of the Congo) FA Msichana

Ahmadou Ahidjo Stadium, Yaoundé
Referee: Leticia Kenga (Central African Republic)

== Top goalscorers ==
There were 21 goals scored in 6 matches, for an average of 3.5 goals per match (as of 4 September 2026).

Rank	Player	Team	Goals
1	(Cameroon) Brenda Tabe	(Cameroon) Lekié FF	4
2	(Cameroon) Adrienne Mekuko	(Cameroon) Lekié FF	2
2	(Equatorial Guinea) Émilienne Endale	(Equatorial Guinea) 15 de Agosto	2
4	(Cameroon) Yolande Zoua	(Cameroon) Lekié FF	1
4	(Cameroon) Nicole Ndjock	(Cameroon) Lekié FF	1
4	(Republic of the Congo) Bénédicte Nzeyi	(Republic of the Congo) AC Colombe	1
4	(Republic of the Congo) Dedina Mabonzo	(Republic of the Congo) AC Colombe	1
4	(Ghana) Portia Boakye	(Democratic Republic of the Congo) FA Msichana	1
4	(Democratic Republic of the Congo) Marlène Kasaj	(Democratic Republic of the Congo) FA Msichana	1
4	(Democratic Republic of the Congo) Bélange Vukulu	(Democratic Republic of the Congo) FA Msichana	1
4	(Equatorial Guinea) Christiane Ebenye	(Equatorial Guinea) 15 de Agosto	1
4	(Equatorial Guinea) Raïssa Meva Nkola	(Equatorial Guinea) 15 de Agosto	1
4	(Equatorial Guinea) Elena Obono	(Equatorial Guinea) 15 de Agosto	1
4	(Equatorial Guinea) Ana María Mba Nchama	(Equatorial Guinea) 15 de Agosto	1
4	(Equatorial Guinea) Kpandjapou Gbati	(Equatorial Guinea) 15 de Agosto	1
4	(Republic of the Congo) Elda Loulendo	(Republic of the Congo) AC Colombe	1
