= 2025 CAF Women's Champions League UNIFFAC Qualifiers =

UNIFFAC qualification to the 2025 CAF WCL

Tournament details
- Host country: Equatorial Guinea
- City: Malabo
- Dates: 17–29 September
- Teams: 5 (from 5 associations)
- Venue: 1 (in 1 host city)

Final positions
- Champions: (Equatorial Guinea) 15 de Agosto (1st title)
- Runners-up: (Cameroon) FC Ebolowa
- Third place: (Democratic Republic of the Congo) FA Msichana
- Fourth place: (Republic of the Congo) AC Colombe

Tournament statistics
- Matches played: 10
- Goals scored: 51 (5.1 per match)
- Top scorer: (Equatorial Guinea) Ana María Nchama (8 goals)
- All statistics correct as of 30 September 2025.

The 2025 CAF Women's Champions League UNIFFAC Qualifiers is the 5th edition of the annual qualifying tournament for the CAF Women's Champions League organized by UNIFFAC for its member nations and will take place in Malabo, Equatorial Guinea from 17 to 29 September 2025.

The winners of this edition will secure their place in the 2025 CAF Women's Champions League, representing UNIFFAC on the continental stage.

== Participating teams ==
A total of five teams from five member associations will participate in the qualifying stage.

Team	Qualifying method	App.	Previous best performance
(Cameroon) FC Ebolowa	2024 Cameroonian Women's Championship champions	1st	Debut
(Chad) TP Elect Sport	2024–25 Chadian Women's Championship champions	1st	Debut
(Republic of the Congo) AC Colombe	2024 Congolese Women's Championship champions	1st	Debut
(Democratic Republic of the Congo) FA Msichana	2024–25 DR Congo women's football championship champions	1st	Debut
(Equatorial Guinea) FC 15 de Agosto	2024–25 Equatoguinean Primera División femenina champions	1st	Debut

== Venues ==
All matches will take place in Malabo at the following stadium:

2025 CAF Women's Champions League UNIFFAC Qualifiers is located in Equatorial Guinea	Malabo
2025 CAF Women's Champions League UNIFFAC Qualifiers is located in Equatorial Guinea	Estadio de Malabo
2025 CAF Women's Champions League UNIFFAC Qualifiers is located in Equatorial Guinea	Capacity: 15,250

== Qualifying tournament ==
Tiebreakers

Teams are ranked according to points (3 points for a win, 1 point for a draw, 0 points for a loss), and if tied on points, the following tiebreaking criteria are applied, in the order given, to determine the rankings.

1. Points in head-to-head matches among tied teams;
2. Goal difference in head-to-head matches among tied teams;
3. Goals scored in head-to-head matches among tied teams;
4. If more than two teams are tied, and after applying all head-to-head criteria above, a subset of teams are still tied, all head-to-head criteria above are reapplied exclusively to this subset of teams;
5. Goal difference in all group matches;
6. Goals scored in all group matches;
7. Penalty shoot-out if only two teams are tied and they met in the last round of the group;
8. Disciplinary points (yellow card = 1 point, red card as a result of two yellow cards = 3 points, direct red card = 3 points, yellow card followed by direct red card = 4 points);
9. Drawing of lots.

Pos	Team	Pld	W	D	L	GF	GA	GD	Pts	Qualification
1	(Equatorial Guinea) 15 de Agosto (H)	4	3	1	0	18	3	+15	10	Main tournament
2	(Cameroon) FC Ebolowa	4	3	0	1	9	4	+5	9	
3	(Democratic Republic of the Congo) FA Msichana	4	2	1	1	15	6	+9	7	
4	(Republic of the Congo) AC Colombe	4	1	0	3	8	11	−3	3	
5	(Chad) TP Elect-Sport	4	0	0	4	1	27	−26	0	

Source: UNIFFAC
(H) Hosts

== Matches ==
17 September 2025
13:00

15 de Agosto (Equatorial Guinea)	5–0	(Republic of the Congo) AC Colombe
Ebenye 28'; Endale 34', 87'; Tassa 71'; Akeng 87'	Report

Estadio de Malabo, Malabo
17 September 2025
16:00

FC Ebolowa (Cameroon)	2–0	(Democratic Republic of the Congo) FA Msichana
Beulou 5'; Nnanga 54'	Report

Estadio de Malabo, Malabo

20 September 2025
13:00

FA Msichana (Democratic Republic of the Congo)	3–3	(Equatorial Guinea) 15 de Agosto
Dikisha 1', 7'; Obono 55'		Nkolo 11', 13'; Obiang 66'

Estadio de Malabo, Malabo
20 September 2025
16:00

TP Elect-Sport (Chad)	1–5	(Cameroon) FC Ebolowa
Mamadji 1'		Kameni 6', 67', 81'; Tchudjang 36'; Mballa 83'

Estadio de Malabo, Malabo

23 September 2025
13:00

15 de Agosto (Equatorial Guinea)	7–0	(Chad) TP Elect-Sport
Jessy Ornella 8'; Nchama 38', 65', 71', 90'; Aubame 55'; Meva 78'

Estadio de Malabo, Malabo
23 September 2025
16:00

AC Colombe (Republic of the Congo)	1–4	(Democratic Republic of the Congo) FA Msichana
Ndiaye 29'		Boleki 41' (pen.); Mohlakoana 58'; Faustine 85'; Obono 90+2'

Estadio de Malabo, Malabo

26 September 2025
13:00

TP Elect-Sport (Chad)	0–8	(Democratic Republic of the Congo) FA Msichana
		Dikisha 5', 7', 15', 46', 65'; Tsanwane 45+2', 48', 63'

Estadio de Malabo, Malabo
26 September 2025
16:00

FC Ebolowa (Cameroon)	2–0	(Republic of the Congo) AC Colombe
Nnanga 8'; Makoma 13'

Estadio de Malabo, Malabo

29 September 2025
13:00

15 de Agosto (Equatorial Guinea)	3–0	(Cameroon) FC Ebolowa
Jessy Ornella 5'; Nchama 35', 86'

Estadio de Malabo, Malabo
29 September 2025
16:00

AC Colombe (Republic of the Congo)	7–0	(Chad) TP Elect-Sport
Ndiaye 2'; Bikounkou 12', 18', 64', 74', 87'; Tokasi 69'

Estadio de Malabo, Malabo

== Statistics ==
=== Goalscorers ===
There have been 51 goals scored in 10 matches, for an average of 5.1 goals per match (as of 30 September 2025).

Rank	Player	Team	Goals
1	(Equatorial Guinea) Ana María Nchama	(Equatorial Guinea) 15 de Agosto	8
2	(Democratic Republic of the Congo) Esther Dikisha	(Democratic Republic of the Congo) FA M'Sichana	7
3	(Republic of the Congo) Fatoumata Ndiaye	(Republic of the Congo) AC Colombe	5
4	(Mozambique) Lonica Vasco Tsanwane	(Democratic Republic of the Congo) FA M'Sichana	3
4	(Gabon) Jessy Mezui Obiang	(Equatorial Guinea) 15 de Agosto	3
4	(Cameroon) Raïssa Nkolo	(Equatorial Guinea) 15 de Agosto	3
7	(Cameroon) Émilienne Endale	(Equatorial Guinea) 15 de Agosto	2
7	(Cameroon) Flora Kameni	(Cameroon) FC Ebolowa	2
7	(Equatorial Guinea) Elena Obono	(Democratic Republic of the Congo) FA M'Sichana	2
7	(Cameroon) Raissa Nnanga	(Cameroon) FC Ebolowa	2
7	(Republic of the Congo) Fatoumata Ndiaye	(Republic of the Congo) AC Colombe	2
11	(Cameroon) Ornella Beulou	(Cameroon) FC Ebolowa	1
11	(Cameroon) Christiane Ebenye	(Equatorial Guinea) 15 de Agosto	1
11	(Cameroon) Tim Shalom Makoma	(Cameroon) FC Ebolowa	1
11	(Equatorial Guinea) Cecilia Akeng	(Equatorial Guinea) 15 de Agosto	1
11	(Togo) Senyebia Tassa	(Equatorial Guinea) 15 de Agosto	1
11	(Chad) Tamar Mamadji	(Chad) TP Elect-Sport	1
11	(Cameroon) Brunelle Beulou Tchudjang	(Cameroon) FC Ebolowa	1
11	(Cameroon) Bernadette Mballa	(Cameroon) FC Ebolowa	1
11	(Gabon) Andrée Aubame	(Equatorial Guinea) 15 de Agosto	1
11	(Democratic Republic of the Congo) Deborah Boleki	(Democratic Republic of the Congo) FA M'Sichana	1
11	(Democratic Republic of the Congo) Kgalebane Mohlakoana	(Democratic Republic of the Congo) FA M'Sichana	1
11	(Democratic Republic of the Congo) Tekonzi Faustine	(Democratic Republic of the Congo) FA M'Sichana	1
11	(Republic of the Congo) Ruth Tokasi	(Republic of the Congo) AC Colombe	1
