= Obono =

Obono is a Fang feminine name. Notable people with the name include:

- Danièle Obono (born 1980), Gabonese-French politician
- Elena Obono (born 1999), Equatoguinean footballer
- Luz Milagrosa Obono (born 1996), Equatoguinean footballer
- Trifonia Melibea Obono (born 1982), Equatoguinean novelist, political scientist, academic, and LGBTQI+ activist
