= Avelina Abang =

Equatoguinean footballer (born 2003)

Personal information
- Full name: Inmaculada Avelina Abang Ndong Nzang
- Date of birth: 8 December 2003 (age 22)
- Position: Right-back

Team information
- Current team: 15 de Agosto

Senior career*
Years	Team	Apps	(Gls)
- Leones Vegetarianos
20??–2023	Malabo Kings		
2023–2024	Huracanes		
2024–	15 de Agosto		

International career^{‡}
2018–	Equatorial Guinea	3	(0)
- * Club domestic league appearances and goals ‡ National team caps and goals as of 20 June 2019

Inmaculada Avelina Abang Ndong Nzang (born 8 December 2003) is an Equatoguinean footballer who plays as a right-back for local club 15 de Agosto and the Equatorial Guinea national team.

Abang was ranked 16th by Goal in the NXGN 2022.

== Club career ==
Abang has played for Leones Vegetarianos FC and Malabo Kings in Equatorial Guinea.

=== Maccabi Kishronot Hadera ===
On 12 June 2023, Abang was announced by Israeli Ligat Nashim club Maccabi Kishronot Hadera as a team signing for the 2023–24 season.

== International career ==
Abang capped for Equatorial Guinea at senior level during the 2018 Africa Women Cup of Nations, playing in three matches.
