= 2023 CAF Women's Champions League UNIFFAC Qualifiers =

UNIFFAC qualification to the 2023 CAF WCL

Tournament details
- Host country: Equatorial Guinea
- City: Malabo
- Dates: 8 – 14 September
- Teams: 4 (from 4 associations)
- Venue(s): 1 (in 1 host city)

Final positions
- Champions: (Equatorial Guinea) Huracanes (1st title)
- Runners-up: (Democratic Republic of the Congo) TP Mazembe
- Third place: (Republic of the Congo) AS Epah-Ngamba

Tournament statistics
- Matches played: 3
- Goals scored: 13 (4.33 per match)
- Top scorer(s): (Equatorial Guinea) Elena Obono (5 goals)
- All statistics correct as of 14 September 2023.

The 2023 CAF Women's Champions League UNIFFAC Qualifiers was the 3rd edition of the annual qualification competition for the CAF Women's Champions League organized by UNIFFAC for its member nations and was held in Malabo, Equatorial Guinea from 8 to 14 September 2023. The winners of this edition qualiied for the 2023 CAF Women's Champions League in Ivory Coast as the UNIFFAC representative.

== Participating teams ==
The following teams will contest in this edition of the qualifying tournament. Cameroonian champions AS Awa withdrew from the tournament due to financial problems.

Team	Qualifying method	Appearances	Previous best performance
(Republic of the Congo) AS Epah-Ngamba	2022–23 Congolese champions	1st	Debut
(Democratic Republic of the Congo) TP Mazembe	2022–23 DR Congo league champions	2nd	Winner (2022)
(Equatorial Guinea) Huracanes	2022–23 Equatoguinean Primera División femenina champions	1st	Debut

== Venue ==
	Malabo
2023 CAF Women's Champions League UNIFFAC Qualifiers is located in Equatorial Guinea	Estadio de Malabo
2023 CAF Women's Champions League UNIFFAC Qualifiers is located in Equatorial Guinea	Capacity: 15,250

== Qualifying tournament ==
This edition of the tournament began with the fixture between Huracanes and TP Mazembe.

Pos	Team	Pld	W	D	L	GF	GA	GD	Pts	Qualification	HFC	TPM	ASEN	ASA
1	(Equatorial Guinea) Huracanes	2	2	0	0	8	3	+5	6	Main tournament	—	3–2	5–1	
2	(Democratic Republic of the Congo) TP Mazembe	2	1	0	1	4	3	+1	3			—	2–0	
3	(Republic of the Congo) AS Epah-Ngamba	2	0	0	2	1	7	−6	0				—	
4	(Cameroon) AS Awa	0	0	0	0	0	0	0	0	Withdrew				—

8 September 2023
14:00

Huracanes (Equatorial Guinea)	3–2	(Democratic Republic of the Congo) TP Mazembe
Obono 35', 77'; Andeme 38'	Report	Kreto 44' (pen.); Dikisha 64'

Estadio de Malabo, Malabo
8 September 2023
17:00

AS Awa (Cameroon)	Canceled	(Republic of the Congo) AS Epah-Ngamba

Estadio de Malabo, Malabo

11 September 2023
14:00

AS Awa (Cameroon)	Canceled	(Equatorial Guinea) Huracanes

Estadio de Malabo, Malabo
11 September 2023
17:00

TP Mazembe (Democratic Republic of the Congo)	2–0	(Republic of the Congo) AS Epah-Ngamba
Dishika 6'; Kreto 45+1'	Report

Estadio de Malabo, Malabo

14 September 2023
14:00

TP Mazembe (Democratic Republic of the Congo)	Canceled	(Cameroon) AS Awa

Estadio de Malabo, Malabo
14 September 2023
17:00

Huracanes (Equatorial Guinea)	5–1	(Republic of the Congo) AS Epah-Ngamba
Obono 17', 28', 63'; Baita 58', 68'	Report	Ondze 75'

Estadio de Malabo, Malabo

== Statistics ==
=== Goalscorers ===
There have been 13 goals scored in 3 matches, for an average of 4.33 goals per match (as of 14 September 2023).

Rank	Player	Team	Goals
1	(Equatorial Guinea) Elena Obono	(Equatorial Guinea) Huracanes	5
2	(Democratic Republic of the Congo) Esther Dikisha	(Democratic Republic of the Congo) TP Mazembe	2
2	(Ivory Coast) Priscille Kreto	(Democratic Republic of the Congo) TP Mazembe	2
2	(Equatorial Guinea) Nuria Baita	(Equatorial Guinea) Huracanes	2
5	(Republic of the Congo) Michelle Ondze	(Republic of the Congo) Epah-Ngamba	1
5	(Equatorial Guinea) Catalina Andeme	(Equatorial Guinea) Huracanes	1
