= Stéphanie Gbogou =

Ivorian footballer

Personal information
- Full name: Drepoba Stéphanie Gbogou Tapé
- Date of birth: 9 May 1995 (age 31)
- Place of birth: Lobakuya, Ivory Coast
- Height: 1.77 m (5 ft 10 in)
- Position: Forward

Team information
- Current team: Al-Amal
- Number: 13

Senior career*
Years	Team	Apps	(Gls)
- Awané FC
- Reine du Yatenga
2019–2021	USFA		
2021–2022	Malabo Kings	8	(7)
2022–2023	Soyaux	20	(4)
2023–2024	Zulte Waregem	16	(1)
2024–	Al-Amal	1	(1)

International career
2021–	Ivory Coast	0	(0)
- * Club domestic league appearances and goals as of 28 September 2024

Drepoba Stéphanie Gbogou Tapé (born 9 May 1995) is an Ivorian-Burkinabé professional footballer who plays as a forward for Saudi Women's Premier League club Al-Amal SC and the Ivory Coast national team.

== Club career ==
Gbogou competed in the inaugural edition of the CAF Women's Champions League in 2021 with the Equatoguinean team, having secured their place by winning the UNIFFAC zone qualifiers. In the final tournament, she scored three goals during the group stage, helping the team reach the semifinals.

In August 2022, Gbogou Joined Soyaux in Division 1 Féminine. On 18 September 2022, she made her debut for the club in a 2–1 defeat against Olympique Lyonnais Féminin, coming on as a substitute in the 82nd minute and scoring her team's only goal 11 minutes later.

In August 2023, She moved to Belgian side Zulte Waregem.

On 12 August 2024, Newly promoted Saudi Women's Premier League side Al-Amal announced the signing of Gbogou on a one-year contract. On 27 September 2024, She started for the team in a 6–2 loss to Al-Ahli where she scored her first goal for the club in the 85th minute.

== International career ==
Gbogou is currently an Ivorian international, having received her first call-up to the senior national team in October 2022 for the qualification of the 2022 Women's Africa Cup of Nations.

== Honours ==
(Burkina Faso) USFA

- Burkinabé Women's Cup: 2019

(Equatorial Guinea) Malabo Kings

- Equatoguinean Primera División femenina: 2021–2022
- CAF Women's Champions League UNIFFAC Qualifiers: 2021
