= Raymonde Kacou =

Ivorian footballer (born 1987)

Personal information
- Full name: Koffi Amenan Raymonde Kacou
- Date of birth: 7 January 1987 (age 39)
- Place of birth: Yamoussoukro, Ivory Coast
- Height: 1.64 m (5 ft 5 in)
- Position: Defender

Team information
- Current team: Leones Vegetarianos

Senior career*
Years	Team	Apps	(Gls)
- Juventus de Yopougon
2021–2022	Malabo Kings		
2023	Sporting Club Chabat Mohamed		
2023–2024	Inter d'Abidjan		
2024	Atlético Malabo		
2024–	Leone Vegetarianos		

International career^{‡}
	Ivory Coast	8	(0)
- * Club domestic league appearances and goals ‡ National team caps and goals as of 12:02, 16 June 2015 (UTC)

Koffi Amenan Raymonde Kacou (born 7 January 1987) is an Ivorian professional footballer who plays as a defender for Leones Vegetarianos and the Ivory Coast national team. She was part of the Ivorian squad for the 2015 FIFA Women's World Cup.

== See also ==
- List of Ivory Coast women's international footballers
