= Atlético Malabo (women) =

Equatoguinean women's football team

- Full name: Club Atlético de Malabo
- Manager: José Pastor Elo
- League: Equatoguinean Primera División femenina
- 2023-24: Equatoguinean Primera División femenina 1st (Champions)

Club Atlético de Malabo is an Equatorial Guinean women's football club based in Malabo. It consists of a professional senior team that currently plays in the Equatoguinean Primera División femenina, the women's top tier of Equatorial Guinea's football. It is the women's section of Atlético Malabo.

Huracanes clinched the Primera División title during the 2023–24 season, but later it was announced that the Equatoguinean Football Federation has awarded the title to Atlético Malabo because Huracanes got an unregistered player in the field in the last game of the season, which was crucial in the title race. In 2024, they were selected as Equatorial Guinea's representative for the UNIFFAC qualifiers.

== Current squad ==
As of 21 August 2024

Note: Flags indicate national team as defined under FIFA eligibility rules; some limited exceptions apply. Players may hold more than one non-FIFA nationality.

No.	Pos.	Nation	Player
1	GK	EQG	Antonina Ayíngono
4		EQG	Martina Luciana Nchama
5	DF	CIV	Raymonde Kacou
6		EQG	Lourdes Emilia Kung
7	MF	NGA	Tessy Biahwo
8	MF	NGA	Adeleke Ganiyat
9		EQG	Concepción Ngüi
11	FW	EQG	Cernuda Juliana Nchama
13		EQG	Justa Baha

No.	Pos.	Nation	Player
14	MF	EQG	Loida Medja
16		EQG	Natividad Boho
17		EQG	Sara Margarita Nlang
18	DF	NGA	Salaudeen Kehinde
20	DF	EQG	Agapita Avosogo
22	MF	TOG	Senyebia Tassa
24	GK	EQG	Rita Afang
—	MF	EQG	Reina Nñegue
—	MF	EQG	Rocío Coffi

== Honours ==
Type	Competition	Titles	Winning Seasons	Runners-up
Domestic	Equatoguinean Primera División femenina	1	2023–24	
Domestic	Copa de la Primera Dama de la Nación	0		2024

== See also ==
- Equatoguinean Primera División femenina
- Copa de la Primera Dama de la Nación
