= Rose Bella =

Cameroonian footballer (born 1994)

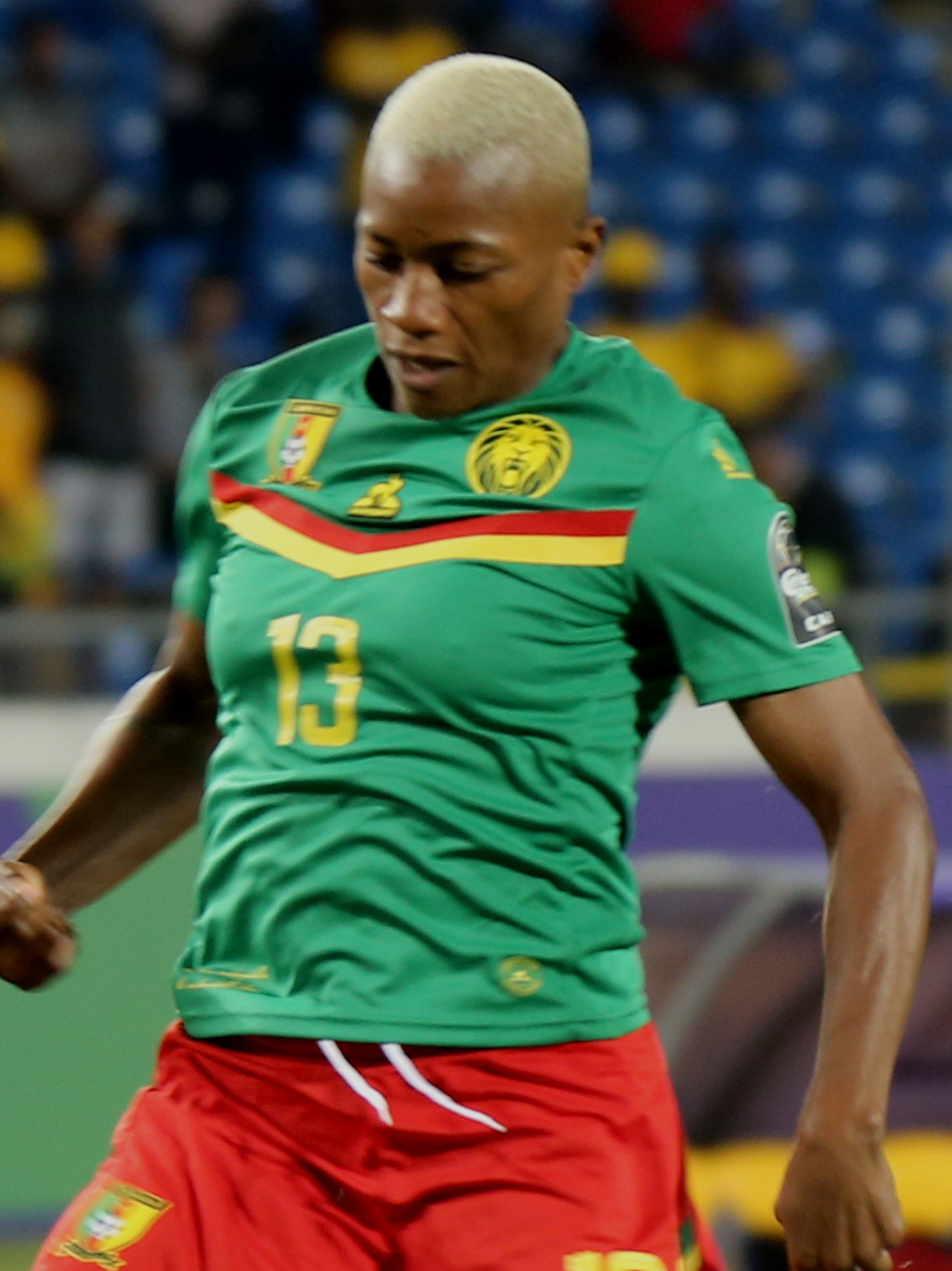
- Bella in July 2022

Personal information
- Date of birth: 5 May 1994 (age 32)
- Place of birth: Cameroon
- Height: 1.68 m (5 ft 6 in)
- Position: Forward

Senior career*
Years	Team	Apps	(Gls)
- Police
2020–2021	Malabo Kings		
2021–2022	Trabzonspor	21	(12)
2022–2023	ALG	19	(4)
2023–2024	Beylerbeyi	12	(2)
2024	Gaziantep Asya	14	(2)
2024–2025	Amed	12	(2)
2025–2026	Al-Ula	14	(4)

International career^{‡}
	Cameroon	7	(0)
Medal record
Women's Africa Cup of Nations
Gold medal – first place	2026 Morocco
- * Club domestic league appearances and goals as of 22 December 2024 ‡ National team caps and goals as of 6 June 2015 (before the 2015 FIFA Women's World Cup)

Rose Bella (born 5 May 1994) is a Cameroonian women's football who plays as a forward for the Cameroon women's national team.

== Club career ==
Bella has played for AS Police in Cameroon and for Malabo Kings in Equatorial Guinea.

In 2021, she moved to Turkey and signed with the re-established team Trabzonspor to play in the Turkish Women's Football Super League.

On 5 August 2022, she transferred to the Gaziantep-based league champion club ALG Spor. On 18 August 2022, she debuted in the 2022–23 UEFA Women's Champions League.

End August 2023, she transferred to Beylerbeyi, which play for the first time in the Super League. In the second half of the 2023–24 season, she moved to Gaziantep Asya, which also was newly promoted to the Super League. For the 2024–25 Super League season, she transferred to Amed from Diyarbakır.

== International career ==
Bella was part of the Cameroon women's national football team at the 2015 FIFA Women's World Cup.

== Career statistics ==
As of match played 20 November 2022.

Club	Season	League			Continental		National		Total	
Club	Season	Division	Apps	Goals	Apps	Goals	Apps	Goals	Apps	Goals
Malabo Kings	2020–21	Equatoguinean Primera								
Trabzonspor	2021–22	Turkish Super League	21	12					21	12
ALG Spor	2022–23	Super League	19	4	1	0			20	4
Beylerbeyi	2023–24	Super League	12	2	0	0			102	2
Gaziantep Asya	2023–24	Super League	14	2	0	0			14	2
Amed	2024–25	Super League	3	0	0	0			3	0
