= Catalina Andeme =

Equatoguinean footballer (born 1999)

Personal information
- Full name: Catalina Andeme Engonga Mangue
- Date of birth: 14 July 1999 (age 27)
- Position: Midfielder

Team information
- Current team: Super Leonas

Senior career*
Years	Team	Apps	(Gls)
201?–2022	Deportivo Evinayong		
2023–2024	Huracanes		
2024–2025	15 de Agosto		
2026–	Super Leonas		

International career^{‡}
2018–	Equatorial Guinea	9	(0)
- * Club domestic league appearances and goals ‡ National team caps and goals as of 5 December 2023

Catalina Andeme Engonga Mangue (born 14 July 1999) is an Equatoguinean footballer who plays as a midfielder for local club Super Leonas and the Equatorial Guinea national team.

== Club career ==
Andeme has played for Deportivo Evinayong in Equatorial Guinea.

== International career ==
Andeme competed for Equatorial Guinea at the 2018 Africa Women Cup of Nations, playing in three matches and scoring one goal.
