= Burkinabé Women's Championship =

- Founded: 2002; 24 years ago
- Country: Burkina Faso
- Confederation: CAF
- Number of clubs: 14
- Relegation to: W-Championship D2
- Domestic cup: Burkinabé W-Cup
- International cup: CAF W-Champions League
- Current champions: USFA (9th title) (2025-26)
- Most championships: USFA (9 titles)
- Current: 2025–26 W-Championship

The Burkinabé Women's Championship is the top flight of women's association football in Burkina Faso. The competition is run by the Burkinabé Football Federation.

== History ==
The first Burkinabé women's championship was contested on 2002–03 season. It was won by Princesses FC du Kadiogo.

== Champions ==
The list of champions and runners-up:

Year	Champions	Runners-up
2002–03	Princesses FC du Kadiogo	AS Lionnes du Houet
2003–04	Princesses FC du Kadiogo	ASF Les Gazelles
2004–05	Princesses FC du Kadiogo	ASF Les Gazelles
2005–06	not held	
2006–07	not held	
2007–08	AS Lionnes du Houet	ASF Les Gazelles
2008–09		
2009–10		
2010–11		
2011–12	Gazelles FC du Kadiogo	
2012–13	Gazelles FC du Kadiogo	Princesses FC du Kadiogo
2013–14	Colombes de l'USFA	Princesses FC du Kadiogo
2014–15	Colombes de l'USFA	Reines du Yatenga
2015–16	Colombes de l'USFA	Princesses FC du Kadiogo
2016–17	Colombes de l'USFA	AO Etincelle
2017–18	Colombes de l'USFA	AO Etincelle
2018–19	AO Etincelle	Colombes de l'USFA
2019–20	abandoned because of the COVID-19 pandemic in Burkina Faso	
2020–21	Colombes de l'USFA	AO Etincelle
2021–22	Colombes de l'USFA	AO Etincelle
2022–23	Colombes de l'USFA	AO Etincelle
2023–24	AO Etincelle	Colombes de l'USFA
2024–25	Colombes de l'USFA	
2025–26	Colombes de l'USFA	

== Most successful clubs ==
Rank	Club	Champions	Runners-up	Winning seasons	Runners-up seasons
1	Colombes de l'USFA	9	1	2014, 2015, 2016, 2017, 2018, 2021,2022, 2025, 2026	2019
2	Princesses FC du Kadiogo	3	3	2003, 2004, 2005	2013, 2014, 2016
3	Gazelles FC du Kadiogo	2	0	2012, 2013	
4	AO Etincelle	1	4	2019	2017, 2018, 2021,2022
5	AS Lionnes du Houet	1	1	2008	2003
6	ASF Les Gazelles	0	3		2004, 2005, 2008
7	Reines du Yatenga	0	1		2015

== See also ==
- Burkinabé Women's Cup
