= AO Etincelle =

Burkinabé women's football team

- Full name: Association Omnisports Étincelle du Faso
- League: Burkinabé Women's Championship

Association Omnisports Étincelle du Faso is a Burkinabé professional women's football club in Ouagadougou who plays in the Burkinabé Women's Championship, the top tier of Burkinabé women's football.

== History ==
In the 2023–2024 season, Etincelle secured their second Burkinabé Women's Championship title, ending USFA's three-year dominance. With this victory, Etincelle earned a spot in the 2024 CAF Women's Champions League WAFU Zone B Qualifiers, where they will represent Burkina Faso in the competition.

== Honours ==
Type	Competition	Titles	Winning Seasons	Runners-up
Domestic	Burkinabé Women's Championship	2	2019, 2024	2017, 2018, 2021, 2022, 2023
Domestic	Burkinabé Women's Cup	2	2018, 2021	2016

== See also ==
- Burkinabé Women's Championship
- Burkinabé Women's Cup
- CAF Women's Champions League
