= Cecilia Akeng =

Equatoguinean footballer (born 2002)

Cecilia Akeng Ñengono
Personal information
- Date of birth: 8 November 2002 (age 23)
- Place of birth: Bata, Equatorial Guinea
- Height: 1.70 m (5 ft 7 in)
- Position: Defender

Team information
- Current team: 15 de Agosto

Senior career*
Years	Team	Apps	(Gls)
2017	Estrellas de E'Waiso Ipola		
2017	Estrellas del Sur		
2018–2022	Deportivo Evinayong		
2023–2024	Huracanes		
2024–	15 de Agosto		

International career^{‡}
2019	Equatorial Guinea U20		
2018–	Equatorial Guinea	8	(0)
- * Club domestic league appearances and goals ‡ National team caps and goals as of 18 July 2024

Cecilia Akeng Ñengono (born 8 November 2002) is an Equatoguinean footballer who plays as a defender for local club 15 de Agosto and the Equatorial Guinea national team.

== Club career ==
Akeng has played for Estrellas de E'Waiso Ipola, Estrellas del Sur and Deportivo Evinayong in Equatorial Guinea.

== International career ==
Akeng capped for Equatorial Guinea at senior level during the 2018 Africa Women Cup of Nations, playing in three matches. She also represented the country at under-20 level at the 2019 African Games.
