= 2021 CAF Women's Champions League UNIFFAC Qualifiers =

Tournament details
- Host country: Home / away
- Dates: 1–29 August
- Teams: 4 (from 4 associations)

Final positions
- Champions: (Equatorial Guinea) Malabo Kings
- Runners-up: (Democratic Republic of the Congo) FCF Amani

Tournament statistics
- Matches played: 6
- Goals scored: 16 (2.67 per match)
- Top scorer(s): (Ivory Coast) Stéphanie Gbogou (4 goals)

The 2021 CAF Women's Champions League UNIFFAC Qualifiers is the 1st edition of the UNIFFAC women's club football qualifier tournament organised by the UNIFFAC for the women's clubs of association nations. This edition was held from 1 to 29 August 2021 in the away and home games. The final is playing in one game format in Malabo. The winners of the tournament qualified for the 2021 CAF Women's Champions League final tournament held in Egypt.

== Participating teams ==
The following three teams will contest in the qualifying tournament. Wadi Degla SC from Egypt is the 2021 Egyptian League champions and he qualified automatiquely as the hosts of the final tournament.

Team	Qualifying method	Appearances	Previous best performance
(Cameroon) Louves Minproff	2020–21 Cameroonian Women's champions	1st	n/a
(Democratic Republic of the Congo) FCF Amani	2020–21 Congolese Democratic Rep. Women's champions	1st	n/a
(Equatorial Guinea) Malabo Kings FC	2020–21 Equatorial Guinean Women's champions	1st	n/a
(Gabon) Missile FC	2020–21 Gabonese Women's Estuaire Provincial Cup winners	1st	n/a

== Qualifying tournament ==
=== Semi finals ===
Team 1	Agg.	Team 2	1st leg	2nd leg
Louves Minproff (Cameroon)	0–4	(Equatorial Guinea) Malabo Kings	0–3	0–1
FCF Amani (Democratic Republic of the Congo)	3–2	(Gabon) Missile FC	0–1	3–1

1 August 2021

Louves Minproff (Cameroon)	0–3	(Equatorial Guinea) Malabo Kings
	Report	Bella 11', 42'; Mfwamba 90+1'

Attendance: 0 (closed doors)
Referee: Valerie Omanda Anselle (Gabon)
15 August 2021

Malabo Kings (Equatorial Guinea)	1–0	(Cameroon) Louves Minproff
Gbogou 10'	Report

Attendance: 0 (closed doors)
Referee: Carine Ayom Ampur (DR Congo)

1 August 2021

Missile FC (Gabon)	1–0	(Democratic Republic of the Congo) FCF Amani
Nzé 27'	Report

Attendance: 0 (closed doors)
Referee: Marie Jose Ngo Biem (Cameroon)
15 August 2021

FCF Amani (Democratic Republic of the Congo)	3–1	(Gabon) Missile FC
Kalubi 27', 35'; Ndoze 54'	Report	Be Nkoghe 50'

Attendance: 0 (closed doors)
Referee: Agnes Ngoma (Congo)

=== Final ===
29 August 2021

Malabo Kings (Equatorial Guinea)	4–1	(Democratic Republic of the Congo) FCF Amani
Mpele 2'; Gbogou 36' (pen.), 46', 62'	Report	Kasaj 21'

Estadio de Malabo, Malabo
Attendance: 0 (closed doors)
12 September 2021

FCF Amani (Democratic Republic of the Congo)	0–1	(Equatorial Guinea) Malabo Kings
	Report	Mfwamba 47'

Joseph Kabila Stadium, Kindu
Attendance: 0 (closed doors)

== Statistics ==
=== Goalscorers ===
As of 15 August 2021

Rank	Player	Team	Goals
1	(Ivory Coast) Stéphanie Gbogou	(Equatorial Guinea) Malabo Kings	4
2	(Democratic Republic of the Congo) Christelle Kalubi	(Democratic Republic of the Congo) FCF Amani	2
2	(Cameroon) Rose Bella	(Equatorial Guinea) Malabo Kings	2
2	(Democratic Republic of the Congo) Grâce Mfwamba	(Equatorial Guinea) Malabo Kings	2
4	(Democratic Republic of the Congo) Marlène Kasaj	(Democratic Republic of the Congo) FCF Amani	1
4	(Democratic Republic of the Congo) Nancy Ndoze	(Democratic Republic of the Congo) FCF Amani	1
4	(Democratic Republic of the Congo) Lina Mpele	(Equatorial Guinea) Malabo Kings	1
4	(Gabon) Nelly Betoughe Be Nkoghe	(Gabon) Missile FC	1
4	(Gabon) Amira Carmélia Nzé	(Gabon) Missile FC	1
