= Cynthia Djohore =

Ivorian professional footballer

Personal information
- Full name: Cynthia Djohore
- Date of birth: 16 December 1987 (age 38)
- Place of birth: Gagnoa, Ivory Coast
- Height: 1.82 m (5 ft 11 1/2 in)
- Position: Goalkeeper

Team information
- Current team: Athlético F.C. d'Abidjan
- Number: 16

International career^{‡}
Years	Team	Apps	(Gls)
	Ivory Coast	28	(0)
- ‡ National team caps and goals as of 12:04, 16 June 2015 (UTC)

Cynthia Djohore (born 16 December 1987) is an Ivorian professional footballer who plays for Athlético F.C. d'Abidjan. She was part of the Ivorian squad for the 2015 FIFA Women's World Cup.

== See also ==
- List of Ivory Coast women's international footballers
