= Valentine Nguele =

Cameroonian football manager

Personal information
- Position: Goalkeeper

Team information
- Current team: Cameroon

International career
Years	Team	Apps	(Gls)
- Cameroon

Managerial career
- 2022–2026: FC Ebolowa(assistant/interim)
- 2026–: Cameroon

Valentine Nguele is a Cameroonian football coach and former goalkeeper who is the head coach of the Cameroon women's national football team. A former Cameroon international goalkeeper, she spent approximately 18 years working as a goalkeeping coach before moving into management. In June 2026, she became the first woman to be appointed head coach of Cameroon's senior women's national team.

== Playing career ==
Nguele played as a goalkeeper and represented the Cameroon women's national football team during her playing career.

== Coaching career ==
=== Goalkeeping coach ===
Following her playing career, Nguele moved into coaching, primarily specialising in the development of goalkeepers. By 2026, she had accumulated approximately 18 years of experience as a goalkeeping coach. She worked with several clubs in Cameroonian women's football, including Louves Minproff and Eding Sport Filles.

Nguele holds a CAF A coaching licence.

=== FC Ebolowa ===
Nguele joined the technical staff of FC Ebolowa Filles in 2022. In October 2022, she was named assistant coach responsible for goalkeepers as part of a technical staff led by head coach Oudou Kpoumié.

Nguele subsequently took charge of the team on an interim basis when Kpoumié was temporarily absent while undertaking a coaching course. Under her interim management, Ebolowa maintained its position at the top of the Guinness Super League, with Cameroon Tribune reporting in May 2026 that the club held a significant advantage over its rivals during the second phase of the season.

By June 2026, Nguele was serving as FC Ebolowa's interim head coach, with the club leading the Guinness Super League. At the time of her appointment as Cameroon coach, reports credited her with overseeing a run of 16 matches without defeat.

=== Cameroon ===
On 12 June 2026, Nguele was appointed head coach of the Cameroon women's national football team. She succeeded Jean-Baptiste Bisseck, who had been dismissed in October 2025. Her appointment made her the first woman to serve as head coach of Cameroon's senior women's national team.

The appointment formed part of a restructuring of the national team's technical staff. French coach Dimitri Lipoff was appointed coordinator of the national team, while Nguele was given responsibility as head coach.

Her first major assignment was to prepare Cameroon for the 2026 Women's Africa Cup of Nations in Morocco. Later that month, Nguele named a 26-player squad for the tournament.
