= Karabo Makhurubetshi =

South African soccer player (born 1999)

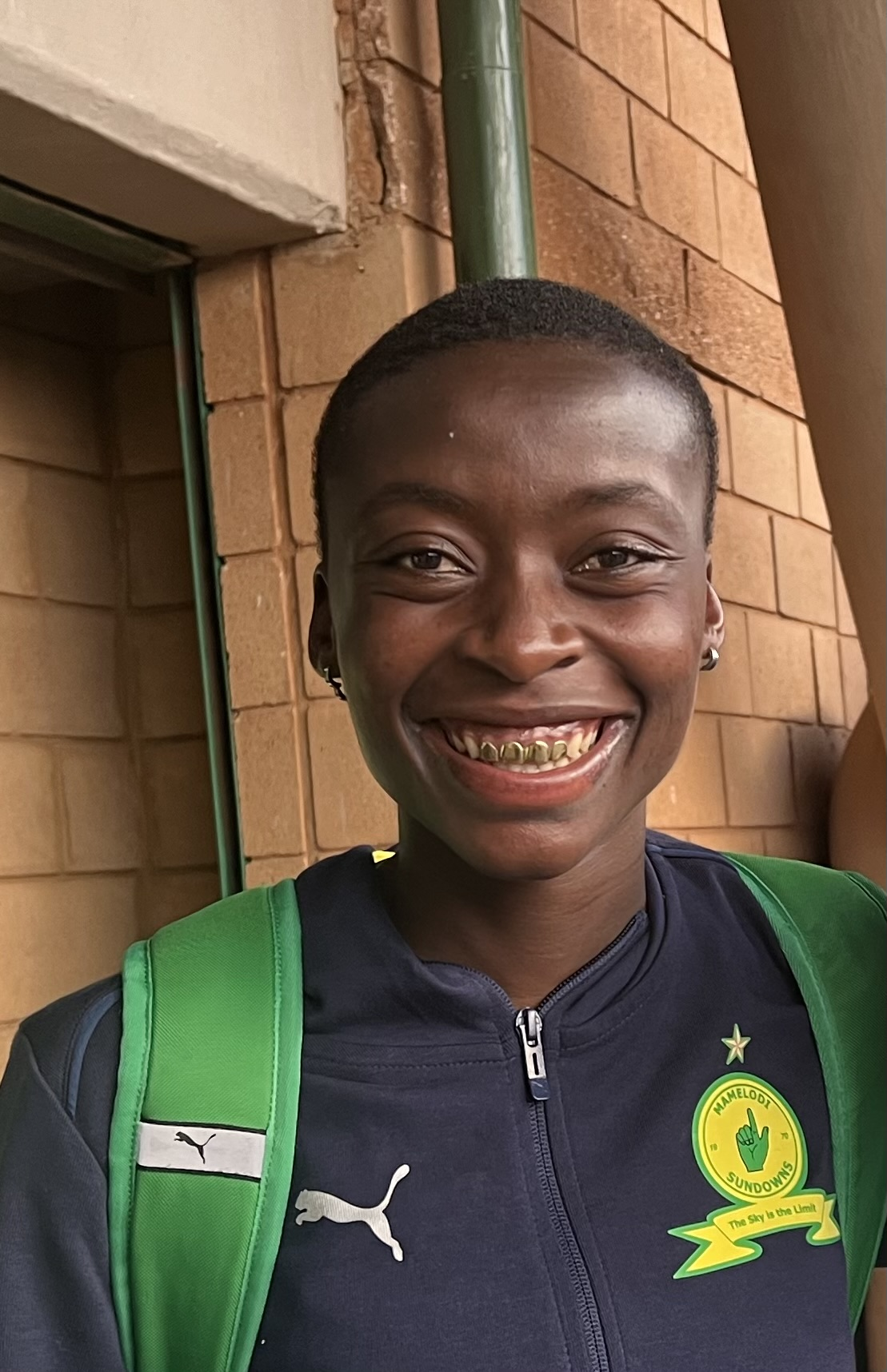
- Makhurubetshi in 2024

Personal information
- Date of birth: 3 February 1999 (age 27)
- Place of birth: Soweto
- Position: Defender

Team information
- Current team: Mamelodi Sundowns Ladies
- Number: 3

College career
Years	Team	Apps	(Gls)
2017-2019	University of Johannesburg		(0)

Senior career*
Years	Team	Apps	(Gls)
2019-	Mamelodi Sundowns Ladies		

International career
2020-	South Africa		
Medal record
Representing South Africa
COSAFA Women's Championship
Gold medal – first place	2020 South Africa
CAF Women's Champions League
Gold medal – first place	2021 Egypt
Silver medal – second place	2022 Morocco
Gold medal – first place	2023 Côte d'Ivoire
COSAFA Women's Champions League
Gold medal – first place	2021 South Africa
Silver medal – second place	2022 South Africa
Gold medal – first place	2023 South Africa
- * Club domestic league appearances and goals

Karabo Makhurubetshi (born 3 February 1999) is a South African soccer player who plays as a defender for SAFA Women's League club Mamelodi Sundowns and the South Africa women's national team.

== Varsity career ==
=== University of Johannesburg ===
In 2019, she was selected in the women's soccer team for the World Student Games held in Italy.

== Club career ==
=== Mamelodi Sundowns Ladies ===
Makhurubetshi was part of the Sundowns Ladies team that won the inaugural SAFA Women's League 2019-20 season undefeated.

In 2021, she was part of the treble winning Sundowns Ladies team. The team won the inaugural COSAFA Women's Champions League, CAF Women's Champions League, and Hollywoodbets Super League.

They were runner's up for the 2022 COSAFA Women's Champions League and the 2022 CAF Women's Champions League. They won the Hollywoodbets Super League for the third consecutive year in November 2022.

In 2023, they won their second treble by winning the 2023 COSAFA Women's Champions League, the 2023 CAF Women's Champions League, and 2023 Hollywoodbets Super League title.

== International career ==
Makhurubetshi competed for the South Africa women's national soccer team at the 2020 COSAFA Women's Championship when they won the tournament defeating Botswana 2–1 in the final. She was also in the 2021 COSAFA Women's Championship team that finished in fourth place.

== Honours ==
=== Mamelodi Sundowns Ladies ===
- SAFA Women's League: 2019-20, 2021, 2022, 2023
- CAF Women's Champions League: 2021, 2023; runner-up: 2022
- COSAFA Women's Champions League: 2021, 2023; runner-up 2022

=== South Africa ===
- COSAFA Women's Championship: 2020
