= Refilwe Tholakele =

Motswana footballer

- Tholakele in 2022

Personal information
- Full name: Refilwe Tebogo Tholakele
- Date of birth: 26 January 1996 (age 30)
- Height: 1.65 m (5 ft 5 in)
- Position: Forward

Team information
- Current team: Mamelodi Sundowns Ladies
- Number: 24

Senior career*
Years	Team	Apps	(Gls)
2014–2022	Township Rollers		
2022	Malabo Kings		
2023–	Mamelodi Sundowns Ladies	28	(13)

International career
2016–	Botswana	23	(16)
- * Club domestic league appearances and goals

Refilwe Tebogo Tholakele (born 26 January 1996), nicknamed Seven, is a Motswana footballer who plays as a forward for Mamelodi Sundowns Ladies F.C. and the Botswana women's national team.

== Early life ==
Tholakele started playing competitive football in 2007. At the age of 13, she was called up to a Botswana women's national under-17 team training camp where head coach Jacqueline Gaobinelwe nicknamed her "Seven" due to Tholakele's preference for the shirt number and being a Standard Seven student.

== Club career ==
=== Township Rollers ===
In 2014, Tholakele signed with the women's team of Township Rollers F.C.

=== Malabo Kings F.C. ===
In August 2022, Tholakele signed with Equatoguinean team Malabo Kings F.C. on a one-year deal. She made a premature exit from the club, citing issues with late payments and poor accommodation.

=== Mamelodi Sundowns Ladies ===
In May 2023, Tholakele signed with SAFA Women's League team Mamelodi Sundowns Ladies F.C. She scored on her debut in a 3–0 win over University of Johannesburg.She lifted her first trophy with the club with the 2023 COSAFA Women's Champions League and also won the 2023 CAF Women's Champions league with Tholakele making it into the team of the tournament and being the top goalscorer.

Refilwe Tholakele received top scorer in 2026

In the 2026 COSAFA Women's Champions League she was top scorer and helped the team win their third regional title. In the 2026 CAF Women's Champions League, she scored the first goal for Sundowns Ladies in a 2–1 win over Lekié FF. She was named in the group stage best XI for her performance.

== International career ==
Tholakele is a former captain of the Botswana women's national under-20 football team.

== International goals ==
No.	Date	Venue	Opponent	Score	Result	Competition
1.	19 April 2016	Curepipe, Mauritius	Mauritius	2–0	4–0	2016 Women's Africa Cup of Nations qualification
2.	19 April 2016	Curepipe, Mauritius	Mauritius	4–0	4–0	2016 Women's Africa Cup of Nations qualification
3.	17 September 2017	Bulawayo, Zimbabwe	South Africa	1–0	1–1	2017 COSAFA Women's Championship
4.	9 November 2020	Port Elizabeth, South Africa	Zimbabwe	1–0	1–0	2020 COSAFA Women's Championship
5.	12 November 2020	iBhayi, South Africa	Zambia	2–0	2–1	2020 COSAFA Women's Championship
6.	29 September 2021	Port Elizabeth, South Africa	South Sudan	1–0	7–0	2021 COSAFA Women's Championship
7.	29 September 2021	Port Elizabeth, South Africa	South Sudan	4–0	7–0	2021 COSAFA Women's Championship
8.	29 September 2021	Port Elizabeth, South Africa	South Sudan	6–0	7–0	2021 COSAFA Women's Championship
9.	20 October 2021	Luanda, Angola	Angola	1–0	5–1	2022 Women's Africa Cup of Nations qualification
10.	20 October 2021	Luanda, Angola	Angola	4–1	5–1	2022 Women's Africa Cup of Nations qualification
11.	18 February 2022	Harare, Zimbabwe	Zimbabwe	1–0	3–1	2022 Women's Africa Cup of Nations qualification
12.	4 July 2022	Rabat, Morocco	Burundi	3–1	4–2	2022 Women's Africa Cup of Nations
13.	4 July 2022	Rabat, Morocco	Burundi	4–1	4–2	2022 Women's Africa Cup of Nations
14.	2 July 2023	Brakpan, South Africa	South Africa	4–0	5–0	Friendly
15.	2 July 2023	Brakpan, South Africa	South Africa	5–0	5–0	Friendly

== Honours ==
Mamelodi Sundowns

- CAF Women's Champions League: 2023
- COSAFA Women's Champions League: 2026
- SAFA Women's League: 2023, 2024, 2025

Individual

- 2023 CAF Women's Champions League: Top Scorer
- 2023 CAF Women's Champions League :Team of the Tournament
- 2026 COSAFA Women's Champions League: Top Scorer
- 2026 CAF Women's Champions League: Group Stage Best XI
