= FC Ebolowa =

- Full name: Football Club d'Ebolowa
- Nickname: The Girls of the South
- Founded: January 2019
- Stadium: Stade Municipal d'Ebolowa
- Coordinates: 2°55′N 11°9′E
- Owner: City of Ebolowa
- Chairman: Dr. Martin Roger Zo'o
- Manager: Valentine Nguele
- League: Guinness Super League
Home colours	Away colours

Football Club d'Ebolowa commonly referred to as Fc Ebolowa (nicknamed as Les Filles du Sud (Note: The Girls of the South)) or Fc Ebolowa Filles, is a professional Cameroonian women's football team based in Ebolowa, South Region, Cameroon. They play in the Guinness Super League, the top tier of Cameroonian women's football league.

== History ==
The club was founded in January 2019, taking over the foundations of FC NYMA (Ngul Ya Mot Asse). And began competing in the Southern regional women's league.

During its first season, having played a unbeaten regional campaign, the club qualified for the national promotion play-offs nationally. Ebolowa earned promotion to the first division after beating Lekié FF. The match, took place at the Odza Technical Centre in Yaoundé, ended 0-0 after 90 minutes before FC Ebolowa won 4-3 from penalties to be promoted into the first division on 4 September 2019. The coach of the team during the promotion season, André Obam, was retained as coach for the following season. The club expanded its squad from 16 players to 25 and was considered to develop both sports and educational programs.

In 2022, the club appointed Oudou Kpoumie as coach. Kpoumie had previously won the championship seven times with Louves Minproff. In the 2023–24 season, FC Ebolowa won the Cameroon Women's Championship for the first time. Led by Flora Kameni, who finished the season as the league's top scorer with 26 goals, Ebolowa finished ahead of Lekié FF on head-to-head goal difference. The result also saw the club qualify for the qualifying tournament of the 2025 CAF Women's Champions League.

Ebolowa lost 2–1 to Lekié FF in the Champions Trophy. The club also missed out on winning the UNIFFAC tournament after suffering a heavy defeat to Equatorial Guinea's 15 de Agosto on the final day. In the league, Ebolowa went into the final day in first place, but a defeat to Vision FA allowed Lekié FF to overtake them and win the championship.

In the 2025-26 season, FC Ebolowa won the Guinness Super League. The club secured the title after defeating Vision Foot by 3-0 in a game played at Omnisports Annex No. 1, Yaoundé in match day number 21. The result put FC Ebolowa on 52 points and seven points clear of runners-up Lékié FC with only one match left to be played.

== Players ==
=== First-team squad ===
As of 17 August 2026

Note: Flags indicate national team as defined under FIFA eligibility rules; some limited exceptions apply. Players may hold more than one non-FIFA nationality.

No.	Pos.	Nation	Player
—	GK	CMR	Jacqueline Carole Nsi Mbarga
—	DF	CMR	Natacha Elam Ekosso
—	DF	CMR	Josepha Chaniela Ayissa Kono
—	DF	CMR	Ousmanou Doudou
—	DF	CMR	Brithanie Abomo Mbida
—	DF	CMR	Mogai Lewyo Djapa
—	MF	CMR	Brunelle Ornella Beulou Tchuidjang
—	MF	CMR	Kelly Emilienne Ntolo Ndjel
—	MF	CMR	Genevieve Owona Mballa
—	FW	CMR	Alice Flora Kameni Djientieu
—	FW	CMR	Pauline Marcelle Priso Ndong
—	FW	CMR	Grace Davilla Mendoua
—	FW	CMR	Christiane Kiki Meva

No.	Pos.	Nation	Player
—	GK	CMR	Eleane Aimee Bibout
—	DF	CMR	Jeanne Berenice Magoumkoua Kouesso
—	DF	CMR	Rose Michele Priso Guidjam
—	MF	CMR	Merveille Rachel Afana Mendomo
—	MF	CMR	Tryphene Noah
—	MF	CMR	Afozo Ingrid Grace Ngambong
—	MF	CMR	Melanie Eboko Panga
—	MF	CMR	Rita Wanki Awachwi
—	FW	CMR	Chris Vanessa Signe
—	FW	CMR	Paule Olive Kamga Biyong
—	FW	CMR	Francine Brenda Oye Omgba
—	FW	CMR	Balkissou Pekure

== Managerial History ==
Dates	Name	Notes	Ref
2020–2022	Eddie Nomo	Coach of the women's section	
2022–2026	Oudou Kpoumie	Head coach	
2026	Valentine Nguele	Interim	

== Honours ==
=== Official ===
Type	Competition	Titles	Winning Seasons	Runners-up
Domestic	Guinness Super League	2	2024, 2026	2025
Continental	UNIFFAC Women's Club Championship	0		2025

== See also ==
- Cameroonian Women's Championship
- Cameroonian Women's Cup
- CAF Women's Champions League
