= Côte d'Ivoire Women's Cup =

- Founded: 2004
- Region: Ivory Coast
- Current champions: FC Inter d'Abidjan (1st title)
- Most championships: Juventus FC de Yopougon (7 titles)
- 2024 Côte d'Ivoire W-Cup

The Côte d'Ivoire Women's Cup is a women's association football competition in Ivory Coast. pitting regional teams against each other. It was established in 2004. It is the women's equivalent of the Coupe de Côte d'Ivoire for men.

== Finals ==
Year	Winners	Score	Runners-up	Venue
2005	Juventus FC de Yopougon	–	Omnes de Dabou	
2006	Juventus FC de Yopougon	4–0	Amazones de Koumassi	Stade Félix Houphouët-Boigny, Abidjan
2007	Juventus FC de Yopougon	–		
2008	Juventus FC de Yopougon	7–0	Onze Sœurs de Gagnoa	
2009		–		
2010	Onze Sœurs de Gagnoa	1–1 (5–4 p)	Juventus FC de Yopougon	
2011	Juventus FC de Yopougon	4–0	Omnes de Dabou	
2012	Juventus FC de Yopougon	6–0	Onze Sœurs de Gagnoa	
2013		–		
2014		–		
2015		–		
2016		–		
2017		–		
2018		–		
2019	Juventus FC de Yopougon	2–0	Onze Sœurs de Gagnoa	
2020	cancelled			
2021	cancelled			
2022	cancelled			
2023	FC Inter d'Abidjan	2–1	Athlético F.C. d'Abidjan	

== Most successful clubs ==
Club	Winners	Runners-up	Winning Cups	Runners-up
Juventus FC de Yopougon	7	1	2005, 2006, 2007, 2008, 2010, 2011, 2012, 2019	2010
Onze Sœurs de Gagnoa	1	3	2010	2008, 2012, 2019
FC Inter d'Abidjan	1	3	2023	

== See also ==
- Côte d'Ivoire Women's Championship
