= Lucrecia Bobuiche =

Equatoguinean footballer (born 1998)

Personal information
- Full name: Lucrecia Bobuiche Boabaila
- Date of birth: 26 March 1998 (age 28)
- Position: Goalkeeper

Team information
- Current team: Estrella de Rebola

Senior career*
Years	Team	Apps	(Gls)
- Estrella de Rebola

International career^{‡}
2018	Equatorial Guinea	1	(0)
- * Club domestic league appearances and goals ‡ National team caps and goals as of 20 June 2019

Lucrecia Bobuiche Boabaila (born 26 March 1998), also known simply as Lucrecia, is an Equatoguinean footballer who plays as a goalkeeper for the Equatorial Guinea women's national team.

== Club career ==
Bobuiche has played for Estrella de Rebola in Equatorial Guinea.

== International career ==
Bobuiche capped for Equatorial Guinea at senior level during the 2018 Africa Women Cup of Nations, playing in one match.
