= Athlético F.C. d'Abidjan =

Ivorian women's football team

Athlético FC d'Abidjan
- Full name: Athletico Football Club of Abidjan
- president: Abdul Fatai
- League: Ivory Coast Women's Championship

The Athletico Football Club of Abidjan is an Ivorian women's football club based in Abidjan.

== History ==
The Athlético Football Club of Abidjan was crowned champions of Ivory Coast in the 2021–2022 season. The club successfully defended their title in the 2022–2023 season, finishing the season undefeated. Thus the club will participate in the 2023 CAF Women's Champions League.

== Players ==
=== Current squad ===
As of 1 November 2023

Note: Flags indicate national team as defined under FIFA eligibility rules; some limited exceptions apply. Players may hold more than one non-FIFA nationality.

No.	Pos.	Nation	Player
1	GK	(Ivory Coast) CIV	Agnès Koffi
2	DF	(Ivory Coast) CIV	Linda Gauzé
3	MF	(Ivory Coast) CIV	Stéphanie Djakpa
4	DF	(Nigeria) NGA	Joy Sunday
5	MF	(Ivory Coast) CIV	Karo Bahi
6	MF	(Ivory Coast) CIV	Fatoumata Zouon
8	MF	(Ivory Coast) CIV	Pennielle Grah
9	MF	(Ivory Coast) CIV	Sophie Assi
10	MF	(Ivory Coast) CIV	Grewa Gnaly
12	FW	(Ivory Coast) CIV	Grâce Agbonou

No.	Pos.	Nation	Player
13	MF	(Ivory Coast) CIV	Mariam Koné
14	FW	(Ivory Coast) CIV	Amenan N'Dri
15	FW	(Ivory Coast) CIV	Sandrine Niamien
16	GK	(Ivory Coast) CIV	Cynthia Djohore
17	MF	(Ivory Coast) CIV	Mélissa Behinan
18	MF	(Ivory Coast) CIV	Karidja Fofana
19	MF	(Ivory Coast) CIV	Espérance Agbo
20	DF	(Ivory Coast) CIV	Matoba Cissé
21	GK	(Mali) MLI	Aïssata Bengaly

== Honours ==
- Ivory Coast Women's Championship
  - Champion : 2022 et 2023.

== See also ==
- Ivory Coast Women's Championship
- Ivory Coast Women's Cup
- CAF Women's Champions League
