= Burkinabé Women's Cup =

- Founded: 2011
- Region: Burkina Faso
- Current champions: AO Etincelle (2nd title)
- Most championships: AO Etincelle (2 titles)
- 2021 W-Cup

The Burkinabé Women's Cup is a women's association football competition in Burkina Faso, pitting regional teams against each other. It was established in 2011. It is the women's equivalent of the Coupe du Faso for men.

== Finals ==
Year	Winners	Score	Runners-up	Venue
2011	Gazelles FC de Ouagadougou	2–0	Princesses du Kadiogo	
2012	not held			
2013	not held			
2014	not held			
2015	not held			
2016	Princesses du Kadiogo	1–1 (5–3 p)	AO Etincelle	
2017	US Ouagadougou	1–0	AS Lionnes du Houet	Stade Dr. Issoufou Joseph Conombo, Ouagadougou
2018	AO Etincelle	1–0	USFA de Ouagadougou	Stade Wobi, Bobo-Dioulasso
2019	USFA de Ouagadougou	4–0	AS Tigresses	
2020	cancelled because of the COVID-19 pandemic in Burkina Faso			
2021	AO Etincelle	4–0	National AS	

== Most successful clubs ==
Club	Winners	Runners-up	Winning Cups	Runners-up
AO Etincelle	2	1	2018, 2021	2016
Princesses du Kadiogo	1	1	2016	2011
USFA de Ouagadougou	1	1	2019	2018
Gazelles FC de Ouagadougou	1	0	2011	
US Ouagadougou	1	0	2017	
AS Lionnes du Houet	0	1		2017
AS Tigresses	0	1		2019
National AS	0	1		2021

== See also ==
- Burkinabé Women's Championship
