= Luz Milagrosa Obono =

Equatoguinean footballer (born 1996)

Personal information
- Full name: Luz Milagrosa Obono Obiang Mangue
- Date of birth: 7 April 1996 (age 30)
- Place of birth: Ebibeyin, Equatorial Guinea
- Position: Forward

Team information
- Current team: Valdefierro

Senior career*
Years	Team	Apps	(Gls)
2013	Intercontinental		
2017–2018	Leones Vegetarianos		
2019	El Ejido	13	(14)
2019–2020	El Gancho	7	(1)
2020–2021	Atlético Saguntino	10	(3)
2021–2022	El Gancho	17	(35)
2022–	Valdefierro	46	(8)

International career^{‡}
2017–	Equatorial Guinea	5+	(0)
- * Club domestic league appearances and goals as of 12 April 2026 ‡ National team caps and goals as of 24 November 2018

Luz Milagrosa Obono Obiang Mangue (born 7 April 1996) is an Equatoguinean footballer who plays as a forward for Tercera Federación club Valdefierro and the Equatorial Guinea national team.

== Club career ==
Obono started with Intercontinental FC in the Equatoguinean women's football league. She moved to Leones Vegetarianos FC in 2017. She joined Spanish team El Ejido in the winter of 2019.

== International career ==
Obono made her international debut for Equatorial Guinea on 26 November 2017, coming on as a second-half substitute in a 4–0 home friendly win against Comoros. She also played in at least one of the two 2018 Africa Women Cup of Nations qualification matches against Kenya and the three matches of the team at the final tournament.
