= Chadian Women's Championship =

Highest division of league competition for Chad women's football

- Founded: 2011; 15 years ago
- Country: Chad
- Confederation: CAF
- Number of clubs: 10
- Level on pyramid: 1
- International cup: CAF Champions League
- Current champions: CECUS (3rd title) (2022–23)
- Most championships: CECUS (3 titles)

The Chadian Women's Championship is the highest level of league competition for women's football in Chad. It is the women's equivalent of the men's Chad Premier League. Starting with the 2021, the league champion will qualify for the CAF Women's Champions League.

== Champions ==
Year	Champions	Runners-up
2011	N'Djaména	Moundou
2012	not held	
2013	CECUS FC	Sarh
2014	N'Djaména	Moundou
2015		
2016	not held	
2017	not held	
2018	not held	
2019	CECUS FC	Retrouvaille FC
