= 2023 CAF Women's Champions League =

3rd CAF Women's Champions League edition

Tournament details
- Host country: Côte d'Ivoire
- Dates: Qualification: 5 August – 16 September; Main tournament: 5 November – 19 November
- Teams: Main tournament: 8 Total: 34 (from 34 associations)
- Venue: 2 (in 2 host cities)

Final positions
- Champions: (South Africa) Mamelodi Sundowns (2nd title)
- Runners-up: (Morocco) SC Casablanca
- Third place: (Morocco) AS FAR
- Fourth place: (Ghana) Ampem Darkoa

Tournament statistics
- Matches played: 16
- Goals scored: 41 (2.56 per match)
- Top scorer(s): (Botswana) Refilwe Tholakele (5 goals)
- Best player: (Lesotho) Boitumelo Rabale
- Best goalkeeper: (South Africa) Andile Dlamini

The 2023 CAF Women's Champions League was the 3rd edition of the annual African women's association football club tournament organized by the Confederation of African Football, it was hosted by Ivory Coast from 5 to 19 November 2023. The winners of this edition will automatically qualify for the group stage of the following edition of the tournament. The qualification draw was conducted on 5 July 2023 at the Mohammed VI Football Academy in Rabat, Morocco.

AS FAR are the defending champions.

== Qualified teams ==
Location of teams of the 2023 CAF Women's Champions League group stage.
Group A
Group B

Qualification for this edition like the previous two editions of the tournament were made up of 6 sub-confederation qualifying tournaments which was contested between August and September 2023 with each confederation having a representative. As defending champions, AS FAR qualified automatically for the main phase of the tournament.

Association	Team	Qualifying method	Appearance
Ivory Coast	Athlético F.C. d'Abidjan (hosts)	2022–23 Ivory Coast Women's Championship champions	1st
Morocco	AS FAR (holders)	2022 CAF Women's Champions League winners	3rd
Morocco	SC Casablanca	2023 CAF Women's Champions League UNAF Qualifiers champions	1st
Mali	AS Mandé	2023 CAF Women's Champions League WAFU Zone A Qualifiers champions	2nd
Ghana	Ampem Darkoa	2023 CAF Women's Champions League WAFU Zone B Qualifiers champions	1st
Tanzania	JKT Queens	2023 CAF Women's Champions League CECAFA Qualifiers champions	1st
Equatorial Guinea	Huracanes	2023 CAF Women's Champions League UNIFFAC Qualifiers champions	1st
South Africa	Mamelodi Sundowns	2023 CAF Women's Champions League COSAFA Qualifiers Champions	3rd

== Draw ==
The draw of this edition of the tournament was held in Abidjan, Cote d’Ivoire on 9 October 2023 at 16:00 CET (16:00 GMT). The 8 confirmed teams was drawn into two groups of four teams. As club competition hosts, Athlético Abidjan was allocated to position A1.

== Venues ==
2023 CAF Women's Champions League (Ivory Coast)	Korhogo	San-Pédro
2023 CAF Women's Champions League (Ivory Coast)	Amadou Gon Coulibaly Stadium	Laurent Pokou Stadium
2023 CAF Women's Champions League (Ivory Coast)	Capacity: 20,000	Capacity: 20,000

== Match officials ==
Referees

- (Algeria) Ghada Mehat
- (Burundi) Suavis Iratunga
- (Cameroon) Aline Guimbang Etong
- (Egypt) Shahenda El Maghrabi
- (Ivory Coast) Natacha Konan
- (Malawi) Eness Gumbo
- (Namibia) Antsino Twanyanyukwa
- (Nigeria) Yemisi Akintoye
- (Rwanda) Salima Mukansanga
- (Rwanda) Aline Umutoni
- (South Africa) Akhona Makalima
- (Togo) Vincentia Amedome
- (Tunisia) Dorsaf Ganouati
- (Uganda) Shamirah Nabadda

Assistant referees

- (Algeria) Asma Feriel Ouahab
- (Benin) Nafissatou Yekini
- (Burundi) Fidès Bangurambona
- (Egypt) Yara Atef
- (Ivory Coast) Prisca Danielle Ta
- (Kenya) Mary Njoroge
- (Malawi) Bernadettar Kwimbira
- (Mali) Fanta Koné
- (Mauritania) Meriem Chedad
- (Mauritius) Queency Victoire
- (Tunisia) Houda Afine
- (Zambia) Nancy Kasitu

Video assistant referees

- (Senegal) Issa Sy
- (Mauritius) Maria Rivet
- (Morocco) Fatiha Jermoumi
- (Morocco) Bouchra Karboubi
- (Morocco) Soukaina Hamdi
- (South Africa) Abongile Tom
- (Zambia) Diana Chikotesha

== Group stage ==
The group stage kick-off times are in West Africa Time (WAT) (UTC+01:00).

=== Tiebreakers ===
Teams were ranked according to points (3 points for a win, 1 point for a draw, 0 points for a loss).

If two teams were tied on points, the following tiebreaking criteria were applied, in the order given, to determine the rankings (Regulations Article 71):

1. Points in head-to-head matches match between the two tied teams;
2. Goal difference in all group matches;
3. Goals scored in all group matches;
4. Drawing of lots.

If more than two teams were tied, the following criteria were applied instead:

1. Points in matches between the tied teams;
2. Goal difference in matches between the tied teams;
3. Goals scored in matches between the tied teams;
4. If after applying all criteria above, two teams were still tied, the above criteria were again applied to matches played between the two teams in question. If this did not resolve the tie, the next three criteria were applied;
5. Goal difference in all group matches;
6. Goals scored in all group matches;
7. Drawing of lots.

=== Group A ===
Pos	Team	Pld	W	D	L	GF	GA	GD	Pts	Qualification
1	(South Africa) Mamelodi Sundowns	3	3	0	0	6	0	+6	9	Advance to semi-finals
2	(Morocco) SC Casablanca	3	1	1	1	5	3	+2	4	Advance to semi-finals
3	(Tanzania) JKT Queens	3	1	0	2	3	7	−4	3	
4	(Ivory Coast) Athlético Abidjan (H)	3	0	1	2	2	6	−4	1	

Source: CAFOnline.com
(H) Hosts
5 November 2023
17:00

Athlético F.C. d'Abidjan (Ivory Coast)	1–1	(Morocco) SC Casablanca
Agbo 37'	Report	Koffi 81'

Amadou Gon Coulibaly Stadium, Korhogo
Referee: Salima Mukansanga (Rwanda)
5 November 2023
20:00

JKT Queens (Tanzania)	0–2	(South Africa) Mamelodi Sundowns
	Report	Ramalepe 41'; Tholakele 75'

Amadou Gon Coulibaly Stadium, Korhogo
Referee: Shahenda El Maghrabi (Egypt)

8 November 2023
17:00

Athlético F.C. d'Abidjan (Ivory Coast)	1–2	(Tanzania) JKT Queens
Niamien 33'	Report	Gerald 66'; Salum 85'

Amadou Gon Coulibaly Stadium, Korhogo
Referee: Antsino Twanyanyukwa (Namibia)
8 November 2023
20:00

Mamelodi Sundowns (South Africa)	1–0	(Morocco) SC Casablanca
Kgadiete 42'	Report

Amadou Gon Coulibaly Stadium, Korhogo
Referee: Vincentia Amedome (Togo)

11 November 2023
20:00

Mamelodi Sundowns (South Africa)	3–0	(Ivory Coast) Athlético F.C. d'Abidjan
Cissé 77' (o.g.); Tholekele 85', 88'	Report

Amadou Gon Coulibaly Stadium, Korhogo
Referee: Suavis Iratunga (Burundi)
11 November 2023
20:00

SC Casablanca (Morocco)	4–1	(Tanzania) JKT Queens
Hajri 30' (pen.); Mourtaji 39'; Koffi 45+3'; Kokora 58'	Report	Hezron (red card) 29'; Athumani 56'; Nyandago (red card) 84'

Laurent Pokou Stadium, San-Pédro
Referee: Salima Mukansanga (Rwanda)

=== Group B ===
Pos	Team	Pld	W	D	L	GF	GA	GD	Pts	Qualification
1	(Ghana) Ampem Darkoa	3	2	0	1	5	5	0	6 (Note: Head-to-head points: Ampem Darkoa 3, AS FAR 0.)	Advance to semi-finals
2	(Morocco) AS FAR	3	2	0	1	4	2	+2	6	Advance to semi-finals
3	(Mali) AS Mandé	3	1	1	1	4	3	+1	4	
4	(Equatorial Guinea) Huracanes	3	0	1	2	2	5	−3	1	

Source: CAFOnline.com
Notes:
6 November 2023
17:00

AS FAR (Morocco)	1–2	(Ghana) Ampem Darkoa
Badri 14'	Report	Yeboah 57'; Benzina 61' (o.g.)

Laurent Pokou Stadium, San-Pédro
Referee: Suavis Iratunga (Burundi)
6 November 2023
20:00

Huracanes (Equatorial Guinea)	1–1	(Mali) AS Mandé
Obono 66' (pen.)	Report	F. Diarra 72'; Karentao (red card) 81'

Laurent Pokou Stadium, San-Pédro
Referee: Ghada Mehat (Algeria)

9 November 2023
17:00

AS FAR (Morocco)	1–0	(Equatorial Guinea) Huracanes
Banouk 33'	Report

Laurent Pokou Stadium, San Pédro
Referee: Shamirah Nabadda (Uganda)
9 November 2023
20:00

AS Mandé (Mali)	3–0	(Ghana) Ampem Darkoa
Kone 40', 71', 73'	Report

Laurent Pokou Stadium, San Pédro
Referee: Dorsaf Ganouati (Tunisia)

12 November 2023
20:00

AS Mandé (Mali)	0–2	(Morocco) AS FAR
	Report	Dembélé 5' (o.g.); Tagnaout 37' (pen.)

Laurent Pokou Stadium, San Pédro
Referee: Antsino Twanyanyukwa (Namibia)
12 November 2023
20:00

Ampem Darkoa (Ghana)	3–1	(Equatorial Guinea) Huracanes
Twum 9', 72'; Gnabekan 88'	Report	Ebenye 90+3'

Amadou Gon Coulibaly Stadium, Korhogo
Referee: Shahenda El Maghrabi (Egypt)

== Knockout phase ==
Semifinals
November 15 – Korhogo
(South Africa) Mamelodi Sundowns	1
(Morocco) AS FAR	0
November 15 – San Pédro
(Ghana) Ampem Darkoa	2 (2)
(Morocco) SC Casablanca (p)	2 (3)

Final
November 18 – Korhogo
(South Africa) Mamelodi Sundowns	3
(Morocco) SC Casablanca	0
Third place
November 19 – Korhogo
(Morocco) AS FAR	2
(Ghana) Ampem Darkoa	0

=== Semi-finals ===
15 November 2023
17:00

Mamelodi Sundowns (South Africa)	1–0	(Morocco) AS FAR
Rabale 72'	Report

Amadou Gon Coulibaly Stadium, Korhogo
Referee: Shamirah Nabadda (Uganda)

15 November 2023
20:00

Ampem Darkoa (Ghana)	2–2 (a.e.t.)	(Morocco) SC Casablanca
Yeboah 6' (pen.); Owusuaa 39'	Report	Yeboah 28' (o.g.); Diarra 56' (pen.)
Penalties
Yeboah (penalty missed); Amoh (penalty scored); Abesik (penalty missed); Amoako (penalty scored); Amponsah (penalty missed)	2–3	(penalty missed) Bouziani; (penalty scored) Diarra; (penalty scored) Miftah; (penalty missed) Mourtaji; (penalty scored) Hajri

Laurent Pokou Stadium, San-Pédro
Referee: Vincentia Amedome (Togo)

=== Third-place match ===
18 November 2023
20:00

AS FAR (Morocco)	2–0	(Ghana) Ampem Darkoa
Nyame 33'; Chebbak 45+2'	Report

Amadou Gon Coulibaly Stadium, Korhogo
Referee: Antsino Twanyanyukwa (Namibia)

=== Final ===
19 November 2023
17:00

Mamelodi Sundowns (South Africa)	3–0	(Morocco) SC Casablanca
Tholakele 21' (pen.), 79'; Rabale 24'	Report

Amadou Gon Coulibaly Stadium, Korhogo
Attendance: 20,000
Referee: Suavis Iratunga (Burundi)

== Statistics ==
=== Top scorers ===
This is the list of the top ten scorers in the main phase of this tournament:

Rank	Player	Team	Goals
1	(Botswana) Refilwe Tholakele	(South Africa) Mamelodi Sundowns	5
2	(Mali) Oumou Kone	(Mali) AS Mandé	3
3	(Ghana) N-yanyimaya Gnabekan	(Ghana) Ampem Darkoa	2
3	(Ghana) Comfort Yeboah	(Ghana) Ampem Darkoa	2
3	(Ivory Coast) Nadège Koffi	(Morocco) SC Casablanca	2
3	(Lesotho) Boitumelo Rabale	(South Africa) Mamelodi Sundowns	2
7	(Cameroon) Christiane Ebenye	(Equatorial Guinea) Huracanes	1
7	(Equatorial Guinea) Elena Obono	(Equatorial Guinea) Huracanes	1
7	(Ghana) N-yanyimaya Gnabekan	(Ghana) Ampem Darkoa	1
7	(Ghana) Jennifer Owusuaa	(Ghana) Ampem Darkoa	1
7	(Ghana) Tracy Twum	(Ghana) Ampem Darkoa	1
7	(Ivory Coast) Espérance Agbo	(Ivory Coast) Athlético F.C. d'Abidjan	1
7	(Ivory Coast) Sandrine Niamien	(Ivory Coast) Athlético F.C. d'Abidjan	1
7	(Mali) Fatoumata Diarra	(Mali) AS Mandé	1
7	(Ghana) Mafia Nyame	(Morocco) AS FAR	1
7	(Morocco) Najat Badri	(Morocco) AS FAR	1
7	(Morocco) Safa Banouk	(Morocco) AS FAR	1
7	(Morocco) Ghizlane Chebbak	(Morocco) AS FAR	1
7	(Morocco) Fatima Tagnaout	(Morocco) AS FAR	1
7	(Ivory Coast) Sylviane Kokora	(Morocco) SC Casablanca	1
7	(Mali) Agueissa Diarra	(Morocco) SC Casablanca	1
7	(Morocco) Meryem Hajri	(Morocco) SC Casablanca	1
7	(Morocco) Chaymaa Mourtaji	(Morocco) SC Casablanca	1
7	(South Africa) Melinda Kgadiete	(South Africa) Mamelodi Sundowns	1
7	(South Africa) Lebogang Ramalepe	(South Africa) Mamelodi Sundowns	1
7	(Tanzania) Stumai Athumani	(Tanzania) JKT Queens	1
7	(Tanzania) Winifrida Gerald	(Tanzania) JKT Queens	1
7	(Tanzania) Alia Salum	(Tanzania) JKT Queens	1

== Final standings ==
Per statistical convention in football, matches decided in extra time are counted as wins and losses, while matches decided by a penalty shoot-out are counted as draws.

Pos.	Team	Pld	W	D	L	Pts	GF	GA	GD
1	(South Africa) Mamelodi Sundowns	5	5	0	0	15	10	0	+10
2	(Morocco) SC Casablanca	5	1	2	2	5	7	8	−1
3	(Morocco) AS FAR	5	2	1	2	7	6	3	+3
4	(Ghana) Ampem Darkoa	5	2	1	2	7	7	9	−2
Eliminated in group stage
5	(Mali) AS Mandé	3	1	1	1	4	4	3	+1
6	(Tanzania) JKT Queens	3	1	0	2	3	3	7	−4
7	(Equatorial Guinea) Huracanes	3	0	1	2	1	2	5	−3
8	(Mali) Athlético Abidjan	3	0	1	2	1	2	6	−4

== Awards ==
The CAF Women's Champions League technical study group selected the following as the best of the tournament.

Award	Player	Team
Best Player	(Lesotho) Boitumelo Rabale	(South Africa) Mamelodi Sundowns
Top Goal scorer	(Botswana) Refilwe Tholakele	(South Africa) Mamelodi Sundowns
Best Goalkeeper	(South Africa) Andile Dlamini	(South Africa) Mamelodi Sundowns
Fairplay team	(South Africa) Mamelodi Sundowns	

The CAF Technical Study Group has announced the tournament’s Best XI as follows:

Goalkeepers	Defenders	Midfielders	Forwards
Best XI
(South Africa) Dlamini	(South Africa) Ramalepe (Morocco) Hajri (Ghana) Yeboah (South Africa) Nhlapho	(Morocco) Chebbak (Lesotho) Rabale (South Africa) Morifi	(Morocco) Tagnaout (Botswana) Tholakele (Ghana) Owusuaa

Coach: Jerry Tshabalala

== See also ==
- 2023 AFC Women's Club Championship
- 2023 Copa Libertadores Femenina
- 2023 OFC Women's Champions League
- 2022–23 and 2023–24 UEFA Women's Champions League
