= Chahrazed Bensekrane =

Algerian footballer (born 1992)

Personal information
- Date of birth: 7 April 1992 (age 34)
- Position: Defender

Team information
- Current team: AS Sûreté Nationale
- Number: 13

International career^{‡}
Years	Team	Apps	(Gls)
2018	Algeria	1	(0)
- ‡ National team caps and goals as of 20 June 2019

Chahrazed Bensekrane (Arabic: شهرزاد بن سكران; born 7 April 1992) is an Algerian international footballer who plays as a defender for the Algeria women's national football team. She competed for Algeria at the 2018 Africa Women Cup of Nations, playing in one match.
