= Boitumelo Rabale =

Mosotho footballer (born 1996)

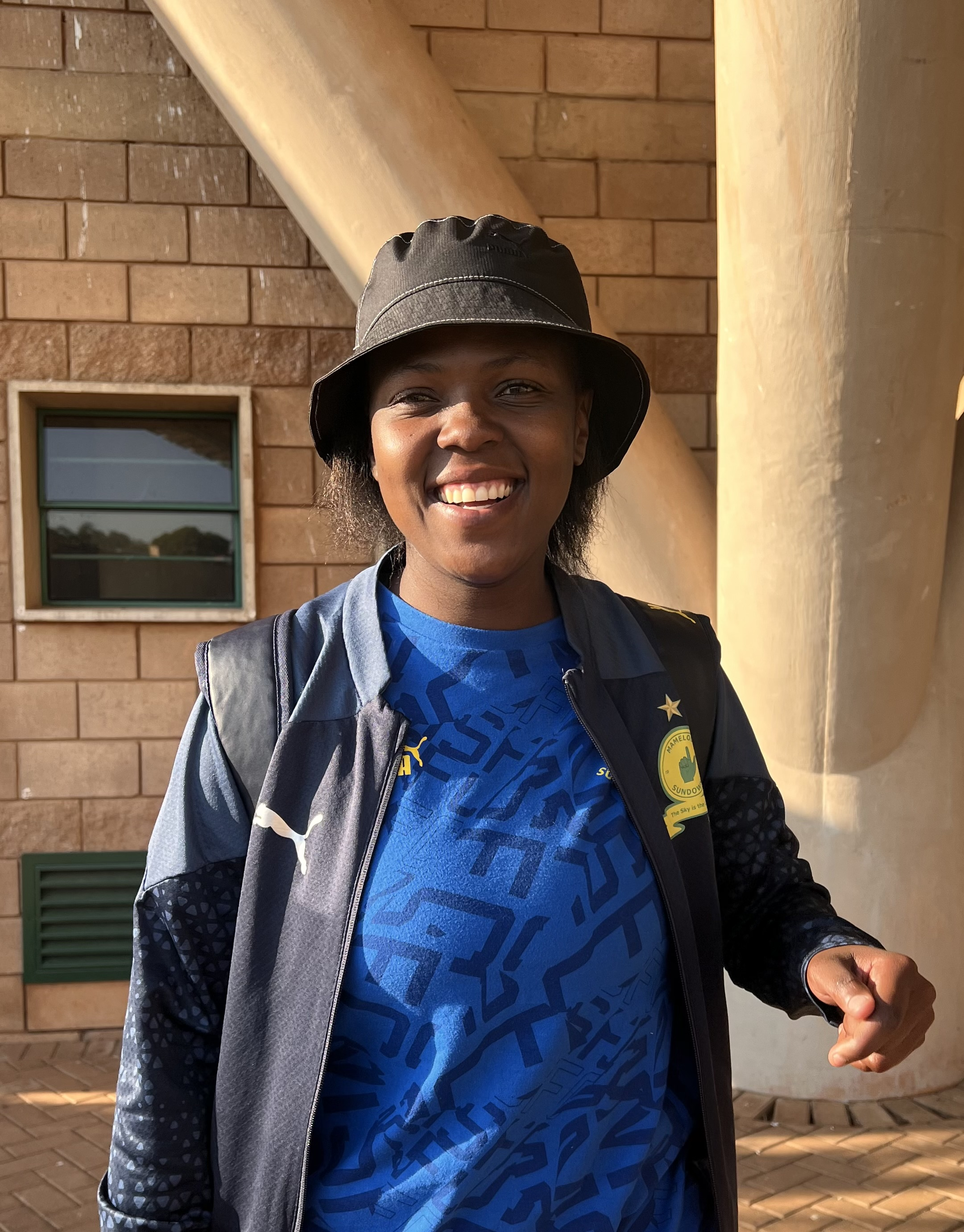
- Rabale at Lucas Moripe Stadium

Personal information
- Full name: Boitumelo Joyce Rabale
- Date of birth: 5 August 1996 (age 30)
- Place of birth: Qoaling, Lesotho
- Height: 1.70 m (5 ft 7 in)
- Position: Forward

Team information
- Current team: Mamelodi Sundowns
- Number: 10

College career
| Years | Team | Apps | (Gls) |
| 2018–2019 | LCCC Trailblazers | | |
| 2020 | CBU Capers | | |

Senior career*
| Years | Team | Apps | (Gls) |
| 2015 | Likhosatsana | 14 | (25) |
| 2016–2017 | Bloemfontein Celtic | 21 | (58) |
| 2021– | Mamelodi Sundowns | 108 | (67) |

International career
| 2018 | Lesotho | 7 | (3) |
- * Club domestic league appearances and goals

Boitumelo Joyce Rabale (born 5 August 1996) is a Mosotho professional woman footballer who plays as a forward for SAFA Women's League club Mamelodi Sundowns and captains the Lesotho women's national team.

Rabale was named the 2023 CAF Women's Champions League player of the tournament.

== Early life ==
Rabale was raised in Maseru.

== Club career ==
=== Likhosatsana ===
In 2015, Rabale won the inaugural Lesotho Women's Super League with Likhosatsana.

=== Bloemfontein Celtic Ladies ===
In 2016 and 2017, Rabale captained Bloemfontein Celtic and led the club to win the league.

In April 2017, she won the Lesotho's Sports Star of the Year award.

=== Mamelodi Sundowns Ladies ===
She won the 2023 CAF Women's Champions League with Mamelodi Sundowns scoring in the winning goal in the semi-final in a 1–0 win over defending champions AS FAR. She scored again in the final in a 3–0 win against SC Casablanca and was named player of the tournament.

== College career ==
Rabale left Bloemfontein Celtic was awarded a Kick4Life Student-Athlete Scholarship where she moved to Lewis and Clark Community College. In January 2020, she was named the National Junior College Women's Soccer Player of the Year following her 2019 season with the LCCC Trailblazers, in which she was the league's top goalscorer with 57 goals and placed third with her team in the NJCAA Division National Tournament.

== International career ==
Rabale capped for Lesotho at senior level during the 2018 Africa Women Cup of Nations qualification.

== Honours ==
- CAF Women's Champions League: 2023 Runners-Up: 2022
- SAFA Women's League: 2022, 2023

Individual

- CAF Women's Champions League Player of the Tournament: 2023
- CAF Women's Champions League Team of the Tournament: 2023
