= Chuene Morifi =

South African association football player (born 1991)

Personal information
- Full name: Chuene Precious Morifi
- Date of birth: 13 February 1991 (age 35)
- Height: 1.65 m (5 ft 5 in)
- Positions: Forward; winger

Team information
- Current team: fomget
- Number: 8

Senior career*
Years	Team	Apps	(Gls)
2017–2024	Mamelodi Sundowns Ladies		
2024–2025	Beylerbeyi	17	(8)
- * Club domestic league appearances and goals as of 22 September 2024

Chuene Precious Morifi (born 13 February 1991) is a South African soccer player who plays as a midfielder for Turkish Women's Football Super League club fomget.

== Club career ==
=== Mamelodi Sundowns Ladies ===
In the inaugural CAF Women's Champions League final she scored the opening goal to make it 1–0 to Sundowns and help the team win their first CAF Women's Champions League.

Morifi was voted by fans the Player of the Season in the 2023 SAFA Women's League, and was added to the 2023 COSAFA women's champion league Best XI and 2023 CAF Women's Champions League Best XI.

In the COSAFA Champions League, she scored in the semi-final against Green Buffaloes from Zambia to give Sundowns the lead and help them to a come-from-behind 3–1 win. She then opened the scoring in the final against Double Action Ladies with the team winning 2–0 to lift their second COSAFA Women's Champions League title.

=== Beylerbeyi ===
In July 2024, she moved to Turkey, and joined Super League side Beylerbeyi in Istanbul.

=== Fomget ===
In July 2025, she joined Super League side Fomget in Ankara. Where she played UEFA women's champions league and UEFA europa women's Cup

== Honours ==
Mamelodi Sundowns Ladies

- Hollywoodbets super League: 2021, 2022, 2023
- COSAFA Women's Champions League: 2021, 2023
- CAF Women's Champions League: 2021, 2023 runner-up: 2022

Individual

- Hollywoodbets Super League Fans player of the season: 2023
- 2022 SAFJA Women's Footballer Of The Year nominee
- 2023 SAFJA Women's Footballer Of The Year nominee
- CAF Women's Champions League: Best XI: 2023
- COSAFA Women's Champions League: Best XI: 2023
