= CD Valdefierro =

Association football club in Spain

Valdefierro
- Full name: Club Deportivo Valdefierro
- Founded: 1960
- Ground: CDM Valdefierro, Zaragoza, Aragon, Spain
- Capacity: 1,000
- Chairman: (Spain) Miguel Asensio
- Manager: (Spain) José Carlos Collado
- League: Regional Preferente – Group 2
- 2024–25: Primera Regional – Group 1, 1st of 18 (champions)
Home colours	Away colours

Club Deportivo Valdefierro is a Spanish football team based in Zaragoza in the community of Aragon. Founded in 1960, it plays in Regional Preferente – Group 2.

== Season to season ==
Season	Tier	Division	Place	Copa del Rey
1965–66	5	2ª Reg.	12th	
1966–67	5	2ª Reg.	6th	
1967–68	5	2ª Reg.	8th	
1968–69	6	2ª Reg.	5th	
1969–70	DNP			
1970–71	6	2ª Reg.	1st	
1971–72	5	1ª Reg.	13th	
1972–73	5	1ª Reg.	20th	
1973–74	6	2ª Reg. P.	16th	
1974–75	7	2ª Reg.	14th	
1975–76	8	3ª Reg.	1st	
1976–77	7	2ª Reg. B	1st	
1977–78	7	2ª Reg.	8th	
1978–79	7	2ª Reg.	11th	
1979–80	8	2ª Reg. B	6th	
1980–81	8	2ª Reg. B	9th	
1981–82	8	2ª Reg. B	3rd	
1982–83	8	2ª Reg. B	4th	
1983–84	8	2ª Reg. B	2nd	
1984–85	7	2ª Reg.	5th	

Season	Tier	Division	Place	Copa del Rey
1985–86	6	1ª Reg.	7th	
1986–87	6	1ª Reg.	17th	
1987–88	7	2ª Reg.	1st	
1988–89	6	1ª Reg.	4th	
1989–90	6	1ª Reg.	4th	
1990–91	6	1ª Reg.	1st	
1991–92	5	Reg. Pref.	11th	
1992–93	5	Reg. Pref.	2nd	
1993–94	4	3ª	20th	
1994–95	5	Reg. Pref.	11th	
1995–96	5	Reg. Pref.	14th	
1996–97	5	Reg. Pref.	10th	
1997–98	5	Reg. Pref.	6th	
1998–99	5	Reg. Pref.	17th	
1999–2000	6	1ª Reg.	2nd	
2000–01	5	Reg. Pref.	14th	
2001–02	5	Reg. Pref.	7th	
2002–03	5	Reg. Pref.	7th	
2003–04	5	Reg. Pref.	11th	
2004–05	5	Reg. Pref.	6th	

Season	Tier	Division	Place	Copa del Rey
2005–06	5	Reg. Pref.	16th	
2006–07	6	1ª Reg.	6th	
2007–08	6	1ª Reg.	1st	
2008–09	5	Reg. Pref.	2nd	
2009–10	4	3ª	10th	
2010–11	4	3ª	11th	
2011–12	4	3ª	5th	
2012–13	4	3ª	18th	
2013–14	5	Reg. Pref.	8th	
2014–15	5	Reg. Pref.	15th	
2015–16	6	1ª Reg.	1st	
2016–17	5	Reg. Pref.	2nd	
2017–18	4	3ª	18th	
2018–19	5	Reg. Pref.	2nd	
2019–20	4	3ª	20th	
2020–21	4	3ª	11th / 9th	
2021–22	6	Reg. Pref.	6th	
2022–23	6	Reg. Pref.	7th	
2023–24	6	Reg. Pref.	18th	
2024–25	7	1ª Reg.	1st	

Season	Tier	Division	Place	Copa del Rey
2025–26	6	Reg. Pref.		

- 8 seasons in Tercera División
