= Esperanza Mbang =

Equatoguinean footballer (born 1989)

Personal information
- Full name: Esperanza Mbang Mba
- Date of birth: 22 October 1989 (age 37)
- Place of birth: Bata, Equatorial Guinea
- Position: Centre-back

Team information
- Current team: Valdemoro
- Number: 4

Senior career*
Years	Team	Apps	(Gls)
2012–2017	Estrellas de E'Waiso Ipola		
2018	Leones Vegetarianos		
2019	El Ejido	12	(3)
2020	Moscardó	5	(0)
2021–	Valdemoro	17	(6)

International career^{‡}
2017–2018	Equatorial Guinea	6	(0)
- * Club domestic league appearances and goals as of 9 April 2022 ‡ National team caps and goals as of 24 November 2018

Esperanza Mbang Mba (born 22 October 1989) is an Equatorial Guinean footballer who plays as a centre-back for Spanish club Valdemoro CF. She has been a member of the Equatorial Guinea women's national team.

== Club career ==
Mbang started with Estrellas de E'Waiso Ipola in the Equatoguinean women's football league. She moved to Leones Vegetarianos FC in 2018. She joined Spanish team El Ejido in the winter of 2019.

== International career ==
Mbang made her international debut for Equatorial Guinea on 26 November 2017, starting in a 4–0 home friendly win against Comoros. She also played two 2018 Africa Women Cup of Nations qualification matches against Kenya and the three matches of the team at the final tournament.
