= Copa de la Primera Dama de la Nación =

- Founded: 2003
- Region: Equatorial Guinea
- Current champions: Huracanes (1st title)

The Copa de la Primera Dama de la Nación (English: First Lady of the Nation Cup) is a women's association football competition in Equatorial Guinea. pitting regional teams against each other. It was established in 2003. It is the women's equivalent of the Equatoguinean Cup for men.

== Finals ==
Year	Winners	Score	Runners-up	Venue
2003		–		Estadio La Libertad, Bata
2004	Águilas Verdes	3–0	Sirenas de Kié Ntem	Estadio Manuel Enguru, Ebibeyin
2005		–		
2006		–		
2007	Sirenas de Kié Ntem	1–1 (4–3 p)	Las Vegas de la Isla	Estadio Manuel Enguru, Ebibeyin
2008		–		
2009		–		
2010	Ewaiso Ipola	1–1 (4–1 p)	Mongomeyen	Estadio de Malabo, Malabo
2011		–		
2012	Intercontinental FC	4–0	Estrellas de Vesper	Estadio Santiago Nguema Eneme, Mongomo
2013	Estrellas de Mongomeyen	2–1	Intercontinental FC	Estadio de Malabo, Malabo
2014	Leonas de Bata	6–1	Estrellas de Rebola	Estadio Manuel Enguru, Ebibeyin
2015	Estrellas de Ewaiso Ipola	3–2	Súper Leonas	
2016	Estrellas de Ewaiso Ipola	4–1	Súper Leonas	Estadio de Malabo, Malabo
2017	Deportivo Evinayong	2–2 (4–3 p)	Leones Vegetarianos	
2018		–		
2018–19		–		
2019–20	cancelled			
2020–21	cancelled			
2021–22	Malabo Kings	2–0	Deportivo Evinayong	
2023	Malabo Kings	2–1	Huracanes	
2024	Huracanes	1–0	Atletico Malabo	Estadio Ignacio Milang Tang ,Evinayong

== Most successful clubs ==
Club	Winners	Runners-up	Winning Cups	Runners-up
Estrellas de Ewaiso Ipola	3	0	2010, 2015, 2016	
Malabo Kings	2	0	2021–22, 2023	
Águilas Verdes	1	0	2004	
Sirenas de Kié Ntem	1	0	2007	
Malabo Intercontinental	1	1	2012	2013
Estrellas de Mongomeyen	1	1	2013	2010
Las Leonas de Bata	1	0	2015	
Deportivo de Evinayong	1	1	2017	2021–22
Huracanes	1	1	2024	2023

== See also ==
- Equatoguinean Primera División femenina
- Equatoguinean Super Copa femenina
