= Congolese Women's Championship =

Highest division of league competition for the Republic of the Congo women's football

- Founded: 1994; 32 years ago
- Country: the Republic of the Congo
- Confederation: CAF
- Number of clubs: 11
- Level on pyramid: 1
- International cup: CAF Champions League
- Current champions: FCF La Source (10th title) (2022–23)
- Most championships: AS Epah Ngamba(2 titles)

The Congolian Women's Championship is the highest level of league competition for women's football in the Republic of the Congo. It is the women's equivalent of the men's Congo Premier League. Starting with the 2021, the league champion will qualify for the CAF Women's Champions League.

== Champions ==
The list of champions and runners-up

Year	Champions	Runners-up
1994	FCF La Source	Azur-Sport
1995	not held	
1996	FCF La Source	Azur-Sport
1996	not held	
1997	not held	
1998	not held	
1999	not held	
2000	FCF La Source	AC Colombe
2001	FCF La Source	Fleur du Ciel
2002	FCF La Source	AC Colombe
2003	FCF La Source	
2004	FCF La Source	AC Colombe
2005	AC Colombe	Espérance
2006	FCF La Source	Espérance
2007	FCF La Source	
2008	not held	
2009	not held	
2010	not held	
2011	not held	
2012	not held	
2013	not held	
2014	not held	
2015	not held	
2016	AC Léopards	
2017	FCF La Source	AC Léopards
2017	FCF La Source	AC Colombe
2018	AS Epah Ngamba	AC Colombe
2019	not held	
2020	not held	
2021	AC Colombe	
2022	AS Epah Ngamba	
2023	CSMD Diables Noirs	AS Epah Ngamba

== Top goalscorers ==
Season	Player	Team	Goals
2002	(Republic of the Congo) Mika Loukoudidu	La Source	9
2004	Passou Ndiaye	La Source	22
2017	(Republic of the Congo) Elda Loulendo	Colombe	4
