= 15 de Agosto Femenino =

Women's football club in Aconibe, Equatorial Guinea

15 de Agosto
- Full name: Fútbol Club 15 de Agosto Femenino
- Coach: Barthélemy Bloade
- League: Equatoguinean Primera División femenina
- 2024–25: LIGUILLA Femenina, 1st of 6 (Champions)
Home colours	Away colours

Fútbol Club 15 de Agosto Femenino, commonly known as 15 de Agosto Femenino, is an Equatoguinean women's association football club based in Aconibe. It competes in the Equatoguinean Primera División femenina, the top tier in the country. And it serves as the women's section of the namesake club.

== History ==
In September 2025, following a successful campaign in the 2025 CAF Women's Champions League UNIFFAC Qualifiers, where they went unbeaten to win the tournament, the team became the third club from the Central African nation to qualify for the finals. On 17 October 2025, the club was nominated for the CAF Women's Club of the Year Award.

== Players ==
=== Current squad ===
As of 8 November 2025

Note: Flags indicate national team as defined under FIFA eligibility rules; some limited exceptions apply. Players may hold more than one non-FIFA nationality.

No.	Pos.	Nation	Player
1	GK	BEN	Diane Ogoun
2	FW	CMR	Nicole Nana Touba
3	DF	EQG	Cecilia Akeng
4	DF	EQG	Agapita Avosogo
5	MF	CMR	Christiane Ebenye (captain)
6	MF	EQG	María Delicia Obono
7	FW	EQG	Ana María Nchama
8	MF	EQG	Nuria Baita
9	FW	GAB	Jessy Mezui
10	MF	CMR	Émilienne Endale
11	FW	CMR	Raïssa Nkolo
12	DF	TOG	Senyebia Tassa
13	MF	CMR	Flora Kameni

No.	Pos.	Nation	Player
14	MF	EQG	Ramona Mibuy
15	FW	CMR	Lewjo Djapa Mogaï
16	GK	BEN	Sourakatou Alassane
17	FW	GAB	Andrée Aubame
18	DF	GAB	Oceyane Nse
19	MF	CMR	Brunelle Beulou
20	FW	GAB	Rudy Philomène
21	DF	EQG	Avelina Abang
22	DF	EQG	Constancia Nchama
23	MF	EQG	Hilaria Ada
24	DF	EQG	María Milagrosa Nchama
25	GK	EQG	Cristobalina Abaga

== Honours ==
- Equatoguinean Primera División femenina
  - Champions: 2024–25
- Copa de la Primera Dama de la Nación
  - (silver) : 2025
- UNIFFAC Women's Champions League
  - Champions: 2025

== See also ==
- Equatoguinean Primera División femenina
- Copa de la Primera Dama de la Nación
