= Elena Obono =

Equatoguinean footballer (born 1999)

Personal information
- Full name: Elena Obono Nkuadum Oyana
- Date of birth: 13 November 1999 (age 26)
- Position: Forward

Team information
- Current team: 15 de Agosto

Senior career*
Years	Team	Apps	(Gls)
2017	Estrellas de Bomudi		
2018	Estrellas de E'Waiso Ipola		
2019–202?	Malabo Kings		
202?–2022	Super Leonas		
2023–2024	Huracanes		
2024–2025	TP Mazembe		
2025	→ M'Sichana (loan)		
2026–	15 de Agosto		

International career^{‡}
2017–	Equatorial Guinea	9	(6)
- * Club domestic league appearances and goals ‡ National team caps and goals as of 5 December 2024

Elena Obono Nkuadum Oyana (born 13 November 1999) is an Equatoguinean footballer who plays as a forward for local club 15 de Agosto and the Equatorial Guinea national team.

== Club career ==
On 20 September 2025, Obono scored for M'Sichana during the 2025 CAF Women's Champions League UNIFFAC Qualifiers.

== International career ==
Obono made her senior debut for Equatorial Guinea on 27 November 2017. She competed at the 2018 Africa Women Cup of Nations, playing in three matches and scoring one goal. She also represented the country at under-20 level at the 2015 African U-20 Women's World Cup Qualifying Tournament and 2019 African Games.

=== International goals ===
Scores and results list Equatorial Guinea's goal tally first

No.	Date	Venue	Opponent	Score	Result	Competition
1	26 November 2017	Estadio de Malabo, Malabo, Equatorial Guinea	Comoros	2–0	4–0	Friendly
2	21 November 2018	Cape Coast Sports Stadium, Cape Coast, Ghana	South Africa	1–2	1–7	2018 Africa Women Cup of Nations

== Honours ==
TP Mazembe

- CAF Women's Champions League: 2024
