= Flora Kameni =

Cameroonian football and futsal player

Personal information
- Full name: Alice Flora Kameni Djientieu
- Date of birth: 13 November 2001 (age 24)
- Place of birth: Cameroon
- Height: 1.60 m (5 ft 3 in)
- Position: Forward

Team information
- Current team: Louves Minproff

Senior career*
Years	Team	Apps	(Gls)
- Louves Minproff

International career^{‡}
2019	Cameroon U20		
2019–	Cameroon	1	(0)
- * Club domestic league appearances and goals ‡ National team caps and goals as of 12 November 2019

Alice Flora Kameni Djientieu (born 13 November 2001), known as Flora Kameni, is a Cameroonian footballer who plays as a forward for Louves Minproff and the Cameroon women's national team.

== Club career ==
Kameni has played for Louves Minproff in Cameroon.

== International career ==
Kameni has won the silver medal at the 2019 African Games with the Cameroon women's national under-20 team. She capped at senior level during the 2020 CAF Women's Olympic Qualifying Tournament.
