= Huracanes F.C. =

Equatoguinean women's football club

Huracanes
- Full name: Huracanes Fútbol Club
- Founded: 2022; 3 years ago
- Dissolved: 2024; 1 year ago (2 years)
- 2023-24: Equatoguinean Primera División femenina, 2nd

Huracanes Fútbol Club was an Equatorial Guinean women's football club based in Bata. It consisted of a professional senior team that played in the Equatoguinean Primera División femenina, the women's top tier of Equatorial Guinea's football.

Huracanes clinched the Primera División title during the 2022–23 season. In 2023, they were selected as Equatorial Guinea's representative for the UNIFFAC qualifiers. They secured victory by defeating the DR Congo club TP Mazembe 3–2 in the initial match and achieved an outstanding 5–1 win against AS Epah-Ngamba in the final game of the group stage. Notably, they did not face the Cameroon club AS Awa, as AS Awa had withdrawn from the competition held in Malabo. This successful campaign earned Huracanes a spot in the 2023 CAF Women's Champions League, making them the second Equatoguinean team to qualify for Africa's top tier women's football competition CAF Women's Champions League after Malabo Kings in 2021.

== Former players ==
For details of former players, see Category:Huracanes FC players.

== Former managers ==
- Severino Beseku

== Honours ==
Type	Competition	Titles	Winning Seasons	Runners-up
Domestic	Equatoguinean Primera División femenina	1	2022–23	
Domestic	Copa de la Primera Dama de la Nación	1	2024	2023
Continental	UNIFFAC Women's Tournament	1	2023	

== See also ==
- Equatoguinean Primera División femenina
- Copa de la Primera Dama de la Nación
