= Malabo Kings F.C. =

Equatoguinean women's football club

Malabo Kings
- Full name: Malabo Kings FC
- Nickname: Las Kings
- Founded: 2018; 7 years ago
- Dissolved: 2023; 2 years ago (5 years)
- Ground: Estadio de Malabo
- League: Unregistered
- 2023: Equatoguinean Primera División femenina, 2nd
Home colours	Away colours

Malabo Kings FC was an Equatorial Guinean women's football club based in Malabo, the country capital city. It consisted of a professional senior team that played in the Equatoguinean Primera División femenina, the women's top tier of Equatorial Guinea's football. It was affiliated to Malabo Kings BC, a men's basketball team, and Futuro Kings, a Mongomo-based men's football team that played in the Liga Nacional de Fútbol.

Malabo Kings has won the Primera División in 2018–19. In 2021, it was selected as the representative for Equatorial Guinea at the UNIFFAC qualifiers which won after beating DR Congo club FCF Amani by a lone goal in the finals and qualified them to the inaugural 2021 CAF Women's Champions League.

== Honours ==
Type	Competition	Titles	Winning Seasons	Runners-up
Domestic	Equatoguinean Primera División femenina	3	2018–19, 2020–21, 2021–22	2022–23
Domestic	Copa de la Primera Dama de la Nación	3	2019, 2022, 2023	
Continental	UNIFFAC Women's Tournament	1	2021	

== See also ==
- Futuro Kings
- Equatoguinean Primera División femenina
- Copa de la Primera Dama de la Nación
