= Equatoguinean Primera División femenina =

Equatoguinean Primera División Femenina
- Founded: 2008; 18 years ago
- Country: Equatorial Guinea
- Confederation: CAF
- Number of clubs: 24
- Domestic cup: Copa de la Primera Dama
- International cup: CAF W-Champions League
- Current champions: Atlético Malabo (1st title) (2024)
- Current: 2026 Primera División

The Equatoguinean Primera División Femenina (English: Equatoguinean Women First Division) is the top flight of women's association football in Equatorial Guinea. The competition is run by the Equatoguinean Football Federation, Since 2021, the league champion qualifies for the CAF Women's Champions League.

== History ==
In 2001, a mini-championship is played by five teams, Estrellas de Ewaiso Ipola wins this tournament called Liguilla Nacional. A real championship was created in 2008 with 12 participating clubs.

== Champions ==
The list of champions and runners-up:

| Year | Champions | Runners-up |
|---|---|---|
| 2008 | | |
| 2009 | | |
| 2010 | | |
| 2011 | | |
| 2012 | Intercontinental | Estrellas de Vesper |
| 2013 | Estrellas de E'Waiso Ipola | Intercontinental |
| 2014 | | |
| 2015 | Super Leonas | |
| 2016 | Estrellas de E'Waiso Ipola | Super Leonas |
| 2017 | Leones Vegetarianos | |
| 2018 | no competition | |
| 2018–19 | Malabo Kings | Deportivo Evinayong |
| 2019–20 | cancelled because of the COVID-19 pandemic in Equatorial Guinea | |
| 2020–21 | Malabo Kings | |
| 2021–22 | Malabo Kings | |
| 2023 | Huracanes | Malabo Kings |
| 2023–24 | Huracanes | Atlético Malabo |

== See also ==
- Copa de la Primera Dama de la Nación
- Equatoguinean Super Copa femenina
