= 2024 CAF Women's Champions League final =

Final of the 2024 CAF Women's Champions League

2024 CAF Women's Champions League Final
- Match programme cover
- Event: 2024 CAF Women's Champions League
AS FAR	TP Mazembe
(Morocco)	(Democratic Republic of the Congo)
0	1
- Date: 23 November 2024
- Venue: Ben M'Hamed El Abdi Stadium, El Jadida
- Player of the Match: Merveille Kanjinga (TP Mazembe)
- Referee: Vincentia Amedome (Togo)
- Attendance: 15,000

The 2024 CAF Women's Champions League final is the final match of the 2024 CAF Women's Champions League, the fourth edition of Africa's premier women's club football tournament organised by CAF. It was played at Ben M'Hamed El Abdi Stadium in El Jadida, Morocco on 23 November 2024.

== Teams ==
Team	Zone	Previous finals appearances (bold indicates winners)
(Morocco) AS FAR	UNAF (North Africa)	3 (2021, **2022**, 2023)
(Democratic Republic of the Congo) TP Mazembe	UNIFFAC (Central Africa)	1 (2022)

== Venue ==
The final of the fourth CAF Women's Champions League was played as a single match at a pre-selected venue by CAF, similar to the format used in the previous editions. The Ben M'Hamed El Abdi Stadium in El Jadida, Morocco.

== Road to the final ==
Note: In all results below, the score of the finalist is given first.

(Morocco) AS FAR		Round	(Democratic Republic of the Congo) TP Mazembe	
Opponent	Result	Group stage	Opponent	Result
(Senegal) Aigles de la Médina	3–0	Matchday 1	(South Africa) UWC Ladies	2–0
(Democratic Republic of the Congo) TP Mazembe	3–1	Matchday 2	(Morocco) AS FAR	1–3
(South Africa) UWC Ladies	2–0	Matchday 3	(Senegal) Aigles de la Médina	4–0
**Group A winners**		Group finish	**Group A runners-up**	
Opponent	Result	Knockout phase	Opponent	Result
(Egypt) FC Masar	2–1	Semi-finals	(Nigeria) Edo Queens	3–1 (a.e.t.)

== Match ==
23 November 2024
18:00

AS FAR (Morocco)	0–1	(Democratic Republic of the Congo) TP Mazembe
	Report	Kasaj 10' (pen.)

Ben M'Hamed El Abdi Stadium, El Jadida
Attendance: 15,000
Referee: Vincentia Amedome (Togo)

**AS FAR**	**TP Mazembe**

GK	1	(Morocco) Khadija Er-Rmichi
CM	4	(Morocco) Siham Boukhami
RB	5	(Morocco) Nouhaila Benzina
LM	7	(Morocco) Doha El Madani
CM	8	(Morocco) Zineb Erroudany		(substituted off) 65'
CF	9	(Morocco) Safa Banouk		(substituted off) 79'
RM	11	(Morocco) Chaymaa Mourtaji
CB	14	(Morocco) Aziza Er-Rabbah (c)	(yellow card) 8'
LB	15	(Morocco) Ghizlane Chhiri		(substituted off) 86'
CF	18	(Morocco) Sanaâ Mssoudy	(yellow card) 90+5'
CB	19	(Morocco) Hajar Said
Substitutes:
DF	2	(Morocco) Zineb Redouani		(substituted on) 65'
MF	3	(Morocco) Ikram Benjaddi
MF	6	(Morocco) Fatima Zahra Dahmos
GK	12	(Morocco) Aya Baghass
MF	13	(Morocco) Ouahiba Boukhami	(yellow card) 90+3'	(substituted on) 86'
GK	16	(Morocco) Hind El Hasnaoui
DF	17	(Nigeria) Maureen Okpala		(substituted on) 79'
MF	20	(Morocco) Nada El Aslani
FW	21	(Morocco) Ouafaa Bentahri
MF	23	(Morocco) Boutaina Aouine
Manager:
(Morocco) Mohamed Amine Alioua

GK	1	(Democratic Republic of the Congo) Fideline Ngoy
RB	2	(Democratic Republic of the Congo) Bélange Nzumba (c)
CB	5	(Democratic Republic of the Congo) Benie Kubiena
RW	8	(Angola) Lacho Flora Marta
AM	9	(Ivory Coast) Lagoali Kreto	(yellow card) 32'	(substituted off) 60'
CF	10	(Democratic Republic of the Congo) Merveille Kanjinga
CM	11	(Democratic Republic of the Congo) Aimeraude Mawanda
LW	12	(South Africa) Kgalebane Mohlakoana		(substituted off) 46'
CM	23	(Democratic Republic of the Congo) Marlène Kasaj
CB	24	(Cameroon) Ladifatou Ngambe
LB	26	(Cameroon) Michèle Moumazin	(yellow card) 25'
Substitutes:
FW	3	(Democratic Republic of the Congo) Wivine Makasi
DF	4	(Malawi) Chimwemwe Madise
MF	7	(Equatorial Guinea) Elena Obono		(substituted on) 46'
FW	15	(Democratic Republic of the Congo) Esther Dikisha
DF	16	(Republic of the Congo) Daurycette Ondze
MF	17	(Angola) Prado
GK	20	(Equatorial Guinea) Dolores Hernández
GK	21	(Democratic Republic of the Congo) Brigitte Ngamita
DF	22	(Democratic Republic of the Congo) Natacha Boyengwa
FW	25	(Ghana) Thelma Baffuor Atuah		(substituted on) 60'
Manager:
(Morocco) Lamia Boumehdi

Player of the Match:
Merveille Kanjinga (TP Mazembe)

Assistant referees:
Meriem Chedad (Mauritania)
Nafissatou Yekini (Benin)
Fourth official:
Natacha Konan (Ivory Coast)
Video assistant referee:
Maria Rivet (Mauritius)
Assistant video assistant referees:
Salima Mukansanga (Rwanda)
Diana Chikotesha (Zambia)

**Match rules**

- 90 minutes
- 30 minutes of extra time if necessary
- Penalty shoot-out if scores still level
- Maximum of ten named substitutes
- Maximum of five substitutions, with a sixth allowed in extra time
- Maximum of three substitution opportunities, with a fourth allowed in extra time
