= 2022 CAF Women's Champions League final =

Final of the 2022 CAF Women's Champions League

- Match programme cover
- Event: 2022 CAF Women's Champions League
AS FAR	Mamelodi Sundowns
(Morocco)	(South Africa)
4	0
- Date: 13 November 2022
- Venue: Prince Moulay Abdellah Stadium, Rabat
- Player of the Match: Fatima Tagnaout (AS FAR)
- Referee: Vincentina Amedomé (Togo)
- Attendance: 15,000

The 2022 CAF Women's Champions League final was the final match of the 2022 CAF Women's Champions League, the second edition of Africa's premier women's club football tournament organised by CAF. It was played at Prince Moulay Abdellah Stadium in Rabat, Morocco on 13 November 2022.

== Teams ==
Team	Zone	Previous finals appearances (bold indicates winners)
(Morocco) AS FAR	UNAF (North Africa)	0
(South Africa) Mamelodi Sundowns	COSAFA (Southern Africa)	1 (**2021**)

== Venue ==
The final of the second CAF Women's Champions League was played as a single match at a pre-selected venue by CAF, similar to the format used in the first edition 2021 CAF WCL. The Prince Moulay Abdellah Stadium in Rabat, Morocco, home of Botola (Moroccan championship) side AS FAR men and women, was selected to host the final.

== Road to the final ==
(Morocco) AS FAR		Round	(South Africa) Mamelodi Sundowns	
Opponent	Result	**Qualifying rounds** Group stage	Opponent	Result
Qualified as hosts		Matchday 1	(Mozambique) CD Costa do Sol	8–1
Qualified as hosts		Matchday 2	(Botswana) Double Action Ladies	1–1
Qualified as hosts		Final standings	**COSAFA - Group A winners**: Pos / Team / Pld / Pts; **1** / (South Africa) Mamelodi Sundowns (H) / **2** / **4**; 2 / (Botswana) Double Action Ladies / 2 / **4**; 3 / (Mozambique) CD Costa do Sol / 2 / **0**; Source: (H) Hosts	
Qualified as hosts		**Qualifying rounds** Knockout stage	Opponent	Result
Qualified as hosts		Final	(Zambia) Green Buffaloes	0–0 (5–6 p)
Opponent	Result	**Final rounds** Group stage	Opponent	Result
(Tanzania) Simba Queens	1–0	Matchday 1	(Nigeria) Bayelsa Queens	2–1
(Zambia) Green Buffaloes	2–1	Matchday 2	(Egypt) Wadi Degla	5–0
(Liberia) Determine Girls	2–0	Matchday 3	(Democratic Republic of the Congo) TP Mazembe	4–0
**Group A winners**: Pos / Team / Pld / Pts; **1** / (Morocco) AS FAR (H) / **3** / **9**; 2 / (Tanzania) Simba Queens / 3 / **6**; 3 / (Zambia) Green Buffaloes / 3 / **3**; 4 / (Liberia) Determine Girls / 3 / **0**; Source: CAFOnline.com (H) Hosts		Final standings	**Group B winners**: Pos / Team / Pld / Pts; **1** / (South Africa) Mamelodi Sundowns / **3** / **9**; 2 / (Nigeria) Bayelsa Queens / 3 / **6**; 3 / (Democratic Republic of the Congo) TP Mazembe / 3 / **3**; 4 / (Egypt) Wadi Degla / 3 / **0**; Source: CAFOnline.com	
Opponent	Result	**Final rounds** Knockout stage	Opponent	Result
(Nigeria) Bayelsa Queens	1–0	Semi-finals	(Tanzania) Simba Queens	1–0

== Match ==
=== Details ===
The final match will helds after playing the Group stages and the semi-finals of the 2022 CAF Women's Champions League final tournament helds in Rabat.

13 November 2022
20:00

AS FAR (Morocco)	4–0	(South Africa) Mamelodi Sundowns
Tagnaout 15' (pen.); Jraïdi 54', 87', 90+2'	Report

Prince Moulay Abdellah Stadium, Rabat
Attendance: 15,000
Referee: Vincentina Amedomé (Togo)

**AS FAR**	**Mamelodi Sundowns**

GK	1	(Morocco) Khadija Er-Rmichi
RB	2	(Morocco) Zineb Redouani
CB	4	(Morocco) Siham Boukhami
CB	5	(Morocco) Nouhaila Benzina
LB	14	(Morocco) Aziza Rabbah (c)	(yellow card) 45+1'
RM	15	(Morocco) Ghizlane Chhiri		(substituted off) 84'
CM	20	(Ghana) Blessing Agbomadzi
LM	6	(Morocco) Fatima Zahra Dahmos
RF	9	(Morocco) Ibtissam Jraidi
CF	11	(Morocco) Fatima Tagnaout	(yellow card) 27'
LF	19	(Morocco) Douha Ahmamou		(substituted off) 90+4'
Substitutes:
GK	12	(Morocco) Zineb Rhziel
GK	16	(Morocco) Hind Hasnaoui
DF	13	(Morocco) Hasnaa Taoufiq		(substituted on) 90+4'
MF	3	(Morocco) Ikram Benjaddi
MF	7	(Morocco) Ghizlane Chebbak
MF	17	(Morocco) Hanane Aït El Haj
MF	21	(Morocco) Houda El Mestour		(substituted on) 84'
MF	24	(Morocco) Chaimae Hyaj
FW	8	(Morocco) Oumaïma Harkouch
Manager:
(Morocco) Mohamed Amine Alioua

GK	1	(South Africa) Andile Dlamini
RB	5	(South Africa) Zanele Nhlapo (c)	(yellow card) 22' (yellow-red card) 52'
CB	12	(South Africa) Bambanani Mbane
CB	18	(South Africa) Regina Keresi Mogolola
LB	4	(South Africa) Thalea Smidt
RM	8	(South Africa) Chuene Morifi
CM	15	(South Africa) Lerato Kgasago	(yellow card) 18'	(substituted off) 46'
LM	19	(Lesotho) Boitumelo Rabele		(substituted off) 69'
RF	9	(South Africa) Rhoda Mulaudzi	(red card) 34'
CF	11	(South Africa) Melinda Kgadiete		(substituted off) 69'
LF	16	(South Africa) Lelona Daweti		(substituted off) 70'
Substitutes:
GK	26	(Botswana) Sedilame Boseja
DF	2	(South Africa) Tiisetso Makhubela	(yellow card) 83'	(substituted on) 46'
DF	22	(South Africa) Khutso Pila
MF	6	(South Africa) Gabbonelwe Kekana		(substituted on) 69'
MF	10	(South Africa) Chantelle Esau
MF	13	(South Africa) Oratile Dikgosi Mokwena
FW	14	(South Africa) Miche Minnies
MF	17	(South Africa) Andisiwe Mgcoyi		(substituted on) 69'
MF	21	(South Africa) Nonhlanhla Mthandi		(substituted on) 70'
FW	25	(South Africa) Thembelihle Masibi
Manager:
(South Africa) Jerry Tshabalala

Player of the Match:
Fatima Tagnaout (AS FAR)

Assistant referees:
Carine Atezambong Fomo (Cameroon)
Asma Feriel Ouahab (Algeria)
Fourth official:
Shamira Nabadda (Uganda)
Reserve assistant referee:
...
Video assistant referee:
Haythem Guirat (Tunisia)
1st Assistant video assistant referee:
Diana Chikotesha (Zambia)
2nd Assistant video assistant referee:
Daniel Nii Laryea (Ghana)

**Match rules**

- 90 minutes.
- 30 minutes of extra time if necessary.
- Penalty shoot-out if scores still level.
- Twelve named substitutes.
- Maximum of three substitutions, with a fourth allowed in extra time.
