= 2024 CAF Women's Champions League UNIFFAC Qualifiers =

UNIFFAC qualification to the 2024 CAF WCL

Tournament details
- Host country: Democratic Republic of Congo
- City: Kinshasa
- Dates: 19 – 23 August
- Teams: 4 (from 4 associations)
- Venue(s): 2 (in 1 host city)

Final positions
- Champions: (Democratic Republic of the Congo) TP Mazembe (2nd title)

Tournament statistics
- Matches played: 6
- Goals scored: 23 (3.83 per match)
- Top scorer(s): (Democratic Republic of the Congo) Esther Dikisha (4 goals )

The 2024 CAF Women's Champions League UNIFFAC Qualifiers is the 4th edition of the annual qualifying tournament for the CAF Women's Champions League organized by UNIFFAC for its member nations and will take place in Kinshasa, Democratic Republic of Congo from 16 to 24 August 2024.

The winners of this edition will secure their place in the 2024 CAF Women's Champions League, representing UNIFFAC on the continental stage.

== Participating teams ==
A total of four teams from four member associations will participate in the qualifying stage.

Team	Qualifying method	App.	Previous best performance
(Democratic Republic of the Congo) TP Mazembe	2023–24 DR Congo league champions	3rd	Champions (2022)
(Republic of the Congo) CSM Diables Noirs	2023–24 Congolian Women's Championship champions	1st	Debut
(Cameroon) Lekié FF	2022–23 Cameroonian Women's Championship champions	1st	Debut
(Equatorial Guinea) Atlético Malabo	2023–24 Equatoguinean Primera División femenina champions	1st	Debut

== Venues ==
All matches will take place in Kinshasa at the following two stadiums:

2024 CAF Women's Champions League UNIFFAC Qualifiers is located in Democratic Republic of the Congo	Kinshasa	
2024 CAF Women's Champions League UNIFFAC Qualifiers is located in Democratic Republic of the Congo	Stade des Martyrs	Stade Tata Raphaël
2024 CAF Women's Champions League UNIFFAC Qualifiers is located in Democratic Republic of the Congo	Capacity: 80,000	Capacity: 60,000

== Qualifying tournament ==
Pos	Team	Pld	W	D	L	GF	GA	GD	Pts	Qualification	TPM	LFF	ATM	CDN
1	(Democratic Republic of the Congo) TP Mazembe (H)	3	2	1	0	12	1	+11	7	Main tournament	—	1–1	—	7–0
2	(Cameroon) Lekié FF	3	1	2	0	6	1	+5	5		—	—	—	0–0
3	(Equatorial Guinea) Atlético Malabo	3	1	0	2	3	11	−8	3		0–4	0–5	—	—
4	(Republic of the Congo) CSM Diables Noirs	3	0	1	2	2	10	−8	1		—	—	2–3	—

Source: UNIFFAC
(H) Hosts
19 August 2024
13:00

TP Mazembe (Democratic Republic of the Congo)	7–0	(Republic of the Congo) CSM Diables Noirs
Kanjinga 33', 38', 45'; Nzumba 45+1'; Dikisha 54', 67'; Mawanda 72'	Report (CAF)

Stade des Martyrs
19 August 2024
17:00

Atlético Malabo (Equatorial Guinea)	0–5	(Cameroon) Lekié FF
	Report (CAF)	Heutchou 17'; Lys 27'; Mekuko 45'; Nnanga 80'; Yakana 86'

Stade des Martyrs

21 August 2024
13:00

Lekié FF (Cameroon)	0–0	(Republic of the Congo) CSM Diables Noirs
	Report (CAF)

Stade des Martyrs
21 August 2024
17:00

Atlético Malabo (Equatorial Guinea)	0–4	(Democratic Republic of the Congo) TP Mazembe
	Report (CAF)	Baffour 21'; Dikisha 26'; Kreto 45+1', 46'

Stade des Martyrs

23 August 2024
13:00

CSM Diables Noirs (Republic of the Congo)	2–3	(Equatorial Guinea) Atlético Malabo
Mabonzo 9'; Fouka Malembe 75'		Mayé 10'; Biahwo 73', 88'

Stade des Martyrs
23 August 2024
17:00

TP Mazembe (Democratic Republic of the Congo)	1–1	(Cameroon) Lekié FF
Dikisha 74'		Mekuko 48'

Stade des Martyrs

== Statistics ==
=== Goalscorers ===
There have been 23 goals scored in 6 matches, for an average of 3.83 goals per match (as of 23 August 2024).

Rank	Player	Team	Goals
1	(Democratic Republic of the Congo) Esther Dikisha	(Democratic Republic of the Congo) TP Mazembe	4
2	(Democratic Republic of the Congo) Merveille Kanjinga	(Democratic Republic of the Congo) TP Mazembe	3
3	(Ivory Coast) Lagoali Kreto	(Democratic Republic of the Congo) TP Mazembe	2
3	(Nigeria) Tessy Biahwo	(Equatorial Guinea) Atlético Malabo	2
3	(Cameroon) Adrienne Mekuko	(Cameroon) Lekié FF	2
6	(Democratic Republic of the Congo) Belange Nzumba	(Democratic Republic of the Congo) TP Mazembe	1
6	(Ghana) Atuah Baffour	(Democratic Republic of the Congo) TP Mazembe	1
6	(Democratic Republic of the Congo) Émeraude Mawanda	(Democratic Republic of the Congo) TP Mazembe	1
6	(Republic of the Congo) Dedina Mabonzo	(Republic of the Congo) CSM Diables Noirs	1
6	(Republic of the Congo) Destinée Fouka Malembe	(Republic of the Congo) CSM Diables Noirs	1
6	(Cameroon) Ernestine Heutchou	(Cameroon) Lekié FF	1
6	(Cameroon) Tiwa Lys	(Cameroon) Lekié FF	1
6	(Cameroon) Raissa Nnanga	(Cameroon) Lekié FF	1
6	(Cameroon) Yvana Makana Yakana	(Cameroon) Lekié FF	1
6	(Equatorial Guinea) Claudia Teresa Mayé	(Equatorial Guinea) Atlético Malabo	1
