= Merveille Kanjinga =

Congolese association football player (born 2003)

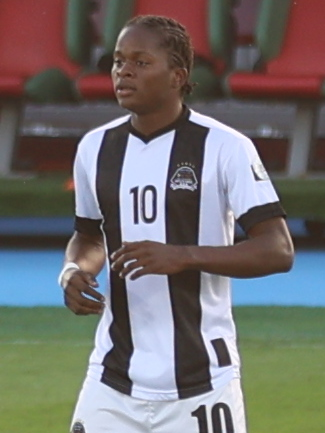
- Kanjinga during the 2024 CAF WCL final.

Personal information
- Full name: Merveille Kanjinga Nanguji
- Date of birth: 1 February 2003 (age 23)
- Height: 1.71 m (5 ft 7 in)
- Position: Forward

Team information
- Current team: Paris Saint-Germain
- Number: 19

Senior career*
Years	Team	Apps	(Gls)
2022–2024	TP Mazembe	17	(10)
2025–	Paris Saint-Germain	30	(15)

International career
2023–	DR Congo	6	(2)
- * Club domestic league appearances and goals as of 22:24, 16 October 2026 (UTC)

Merveille Kanjinga Nanguji (born 1 February 2003) is a Congolese professional footballer who plays as a forward for Première Ligue club Paris Saint-Germain and the Democratic Republic of the Congo national team.

== Club career ==
In June 2022, Kanjinga showcased her goal-scoring prowess during the 13th Coupe du Congo des Dames, scoring in each match, including scoring four goals in a 14–0 quarterfinal victory for Mazembe, bringing her tally in the tournament to 21 goals. In August 2022, she competed with the club in the 2022 CAF Women's Champions League UNIFFAC Qualifiers in Malabo, where she emerged as the tournament's top scorer with four goals, including the winner goal in the final against AS Awa. In October 2022, she scored the club's first goal in a CAF Women's Champions League match which secured them the win against Wadi Degla, marking their first win in the tournament.

In November 2024, Kanjinga, who had scored a hat-trick against CSM Diables Noirs in the qualifiers, played a key role in the final tournament, helping the club secure their first-ever continental trophy. She scored three goals throughout the tournament and was named Player of the Match in the final.

On 8 January 2025, Le Parisien announced that Kanjinga is set to join Paris Saint-Germain from TP Mazembe. On 31 January 2025, PSG unveiled her as their new signing on a contract running until 2027.

== International career ==
Kanjinga is a Congolese international. On 26 September 2023, she scored her first goal in the 31st minute of a 2–1 win against Benin. In December of the same year, she scored in a 2–1 win against Equatorial Guinea to send DR Congo to their first WAFCON in 12 years.

== Career statistics ==
=== International goals ===
Scores and results list DR Congo's goal tally first, score column indicates score after each Kanjinga goal.

List of international goals scored by Merveille Kanjinga
No.	Date	Venue	Opponent	Score	Result	Competition	Ref.
1	26 September 2023	Cotonou, Benin	Benin	1–1	2–1	2024 WAFCON qualification	
2	5 December 2023	Kinshasa, DR Congo	Equatorial Guinea	1–1	2–1	2024 WAFCON qualification	
3	12 April 2026	Ratchaburi, Thailand	Indonesia	1–1	7–1	2026 FIFA Series	
4	12 April 2026	Ratchaburi, Thailand	Indonesia	5–1	7–1	2026 FIFA Series	

== Honours ==
TP Mazembe

- DR Congo Women's Championship: 2022, 2023, 2024
- DR Congo Women's Cup: 2022
- CAF Women's Champions League: 2024
- UNIFFAC Women's Tournament: 2022, 2024
