= Flora Marta Lacho =

Angolan footballer (born 1999)

- Lacho with the Kansas City Current in 2025

Personal information
- Full name: Flora Marta Lacho
- Date of birth: 16 March 1999 (age 27)
- Place of birth: Luanda, Angola
- Height: 1.60 m (5 ft 3 in)
- Position: Winger

Team information
- Current team: HB Køge (on loan from the Kansas City Current)

Senior career*
Years	Team	Apps	(Gls)
2024	TP Mazembe		
2025–	Kansas City Current	6	(0)
2025–	→ HB Køge (loan)	0	(0)
- * Club domestic league appearances and goals as of 21 August 2025

Flora Marta Lacho (born 16 March 1999) is an Angolan professional footballer who plays as a winger for Danish A-Liga club HB Køge, on loan from the Kansas City Current.

== Club career ==
Prior to beginning her professional career, Lacho spent time at Congolese side AC Leopards before temporarily quitting football to focus on a career as a coach. In 2024 she would return to the field, joining TP Mazembe on a short-term contract.

=== TP Mazembe ===
In November 2024, Lacho was named as part of the TP Mazembe squad to take part at the 2024 CAF Women's Champions League. They would go on to win the tournament, becoming the first Congolese side to be crowned African champions.

Lacho earned the unusual distinction of being named Woman of the Match in three separate games at the competition, also scoring in wins over Aigles de la Medina and UWC.

On 15 November 2024, she was named as part of the Best XI of the 2024 CAF Women's Champions League. A week previously she had been named part of the Best XI of the Group Stage.

On 4 December 2024, Lacho was nominated for Interclub Player of the Year (Women) at the 2024 CAF Awards.

=== Kansas City Current ===
On 12 March 2025, the Kansas City Current announced that they had signed Lacho to a two-year contract, making her the first Angola player in National Women's Soccer League history. On 21 August, the Current sent Lacho on a one-year loan to Danish club HB Køge.

== Honours ==
=== Individual ===
- CAF Interclub Player of the Year (Women): 2024 (Nominated)
- CAF Women's Champions League Best XI: 2024
- CAF Women's Champions League Group Stage Best XI: 2024
