= CAF National Team of the Year =

Annual association football award presented by the Confederation of African Football

National Team of the Year
- Awarded for: Best men's and women's National football Team of the Year
- Presented by: Confederation of African Football
- First award: 2004
- Currently held by: Morocco U-20 (men); Nigeria (women)

Highlights
- Most awards: Algeria (men, 7); Cameroon (men, 7); Nigeria (women, 7)

The CAF National Team of the Year is an annual association football award presented by the Confederation of African Football during the CAF Awards ceremony. It honours the best men's and women's national football teams of the previous season.

== History ==
The team of the year award was organized by France Football from 1980 to 2004, and by CAF from 2004 onwards.

== Winners (men's) ==
| Year | National team |
|---|---|
| 2025 | Morocco U-20 |
| 2024 | Ivory Coast |
| 2023 | Morocco |
| 2022 | Senegal |
| 2019 | Algeria |
| 2018 | Mauritania |
| 2017 | Egypt |
| 2016 | Uganda |
| 2015 | Ivory Coast |
| 2014 | Algeria |
| 2013 | Nigeria |
| 2012 | Zambia |
| 2011 | Botswana |
| 2010 | Ghana |
| 2009 | Algeria |
| 2008 | Egypt |
| 2007 | Senegal |
| 2006 | Ghana |
| 2005 | Tunisia |
| 2004 | Tunisia |

=== Under France Football ===
| Year | National team |
|---|---|
| 2003 | Cameroon |
| 2002 | Senegal |
| 2001 | Senegal |
| 2000 | Cameroon |
| 1999 | Tunisia |
| 1998 | Egypt |
| 1997 | Morocco |
| 1996 | South Africa |
| 1995 | Tunisia |
| 1994 | Nigeria |
| 1993 | Nigeria |
| 1992 | Ivory Coast |
| 1991 | Algeria |
| 1990 | Cameroon |
| 1989 | Cameroon |
| 1988 | Cameroon |
| 1987 | Cameroon |
| 1986 | Morocco |
| 1985 | Morocco |
| 1984 | Cameroon |
| 1983 | Ghana |
| 1982 | Algeria |
| 1981 | Algeria |
| 1980 | Algeria |

Ranking by team

| Team | First place | Second place | Third place |
|---|---|---|---|
| Cameroon | 7 (1984, 1987, 1988, 1989, 1990, 2000, 2003) | 4 (1981, 1982, 1986, 2002) | 1 (1993) |
| Algeria | 7 (1980, 1981, 1982, 1991, 2009, 2014, 2019) | 3 (1985, 1986, 2015) | 3 (1987, 1989, 2010) |
| Morocco | 4 (1985, 1986, 1997, 2023) | 5 (1993, 1998, 2003, 2004, 2018) | 2 (1980, 2025) |
| Tunisia | 4 (1995, 1999, 2004, 2005) | 2 (1996, 1997) | 0 |
| Senegal | 4 (2001, 2002, 2007, 2022) | 1 (2019) | 1 (1985) |
| Egypt | 3 (1998, 2008, 2017) | 7 (1983, 1984, 1986, 1987, 1989, 2006, 2010) | 2 (1990, 1991) |
| Nigeria | 3 (1993, 1994, 2013) | 4 (1980, 1991, 2001, 2014) | 6 (1983, 1984, 1988, 1998, 2002, 2004) |
| Ivory Coast | 3 (1992, 2015, 2024) | 2 (2009, 2011) | 3 (1994, 2006, 2012) |
| Ghana | 3 (1983, 2006, 2010) | 1 (2005) | 5 (1981, 1982, 1992, 2009, 2015) |
| Zambia | 1 (2012) | 2 (1988, 1994) | 2 (1996, 1997) |
| South Africa | 1 (1996) | 0 | 0 |
| Botswana | 1 (2011) | 0 | 0 |
| Uganda | 1 (2016) | 0 | 0 |
| Mauritania | 1 (2018) | 0 | 0 |
| Morocco U-20 | 1 (2025) | 0 | 0 |
| Cape Verde | 0 | 2 (2012, 2025) | 0 |
| Angola | 0 | 1 (1995) | 0 |
| Mozambique | 0 | 1 (1995) | 0 |
| Burkina Faso | 0 | 1 (2013) | 0 |
| Ethiopia | 0 | 0 | 1 (2013) |
| Mali | 0 | 0 | 1 (2003) |
| Togo | 0 | 0 | 1 (2005) |
| Niger | 0 | 0 | 1 (2011) |
| Libya | 0 | 0 | 1 (2014) |

== Winners (women's) ==
The team of the year award was organized by CAF since 2010.

| Year | National team |
|---|---|
| 2025 | Nigeria |
| 2024 | Nigeria |
| 2023 | Nigeria |
| 2022 | South Africa |
| 2019 | Cameroon |
| 2018 | Nigeria |
| 2017 | South Africa |
| 2016 | Nigeria |
| 2015 | Cameroon |
| 2014 | Nigeria |
| 2013 | No vote |
| 2012 | Equatorial Guinea |
| 2011 | Cameroon |
| 2010 | Nigeria |

== See also ==
- African Footballer of the Year
- African Women's Footballer of the Year
- CAF Club of the Year
