= CAF Club of the Year =

Annual association football award presented by the Confederation of African Football

Club of the Year
- Awarded for: Best men's and women's football clubs of the season
- Presented by: Confederation of African Football
- First award: 2001
- Currently held by: (Egypt) Pyramids FC (men) (Morocco) AS FAR (women)

Highlights
- Most awards: (Egypt) Al Ahly(men, 7) (South Africa) Mamelodi Sundowns (women, 2)

The CAF Club of the Year is an annual association football award presented by the Confederation of African Football during the CAF Awards ceremony. It honours the best men's and women's football clubs of the previous season.

== Winners (men's) ==
Year	Club	Nation
2025	Pyramids FC	Egypt
2024	Al Ahly	Egypt
2023	Al Ahly	Egypt
2022	Wydad AC	Morocco
2017	Wydad AC	Morocco
2016	Mamelodi Sundowns	South Africa
2015	TP Mazembe	DR Congo
2014	ES Sétif	Algeria
2013	Al Ahly	Egypt
2012	Al Ahly	Egypt
2011	Espérance de Tunis	Tunisia
2010	TP Mazembe	DR Congo
2009	TP Mazembe	DR Congo
2008	Al Ahly	Egypt
2007	Étoile du Sahel	Tunisia
2006	Al Ahly	Egypt
2005	Al Ahly	Egypt
2004	Enyimba	Nigeria
2003	Enyimba	Nigeria
2002	Zamalek	Egypt
2001	Kaizer Chiefs	South Africa

=== Statistics ===
==== By club ====
Club	Titles
(Egypt) Al Ahly	7
(Democratic Republic of the Congo) TP Mazembe	3
(Morocco) Wydad AC	2
(Nigeria) Enyimba	2
(Egypt) Pyramids FC	1
(South Africa) Mamelodi Sundowns	1
(Tunisia) Espérance de Tunis	1
(Tunisia) Étoile du Sahel	1
(Egypt) Zamalek	1
(South Africa) Kaizer Chiefs	1

==== By country ====
Country	Titles
Egypt	9
(Democratic Republic of the Congo) DR Congo	3
Morocco	2
Tunisia	2
South Africa	2
Nigeria	2
Algeria	1

== Winners (women's) ==
Year	Club	Nation
2025	AS FAR	Morocco
2024	TP Mazembe	DR Congo
2023	Mamelodi Sundowns	South Africa
2022	Mamelodi Sundowns	South Africa

=== Statistics ===
==== By club ====
Club	Titles
(South Africa) Mamelodi Sundowns	2
(Democratic Republic of the Congo) TP Mazembe	1
(Morocco) AS FAR	1

==== By country ====
Country	Titles
South Africa	2
(Democratic Republic of the Congo) DR Congo	1
Morocco	1

== See also ==
- African Footballer of the Year
- African Women's Footballer of the Year
