= Nonhlanhla Mthandi =

South African soccer player (born 1995)

Nohlanhla Mthandi
- Mthandi for Mamelodi Sundowns in 2026

Personal information
- Date of birth: 19 August 1995 (age 31)
- Place of birth: Kagiso, Gauteng, South Africa
- Position: Midfielder

Team information
- Current team: Mamelodi Sundowns
- Number: 21

Youth career
- –: Lusaka Ladies

Senior career*
Years	Team	Apps	(Gls)
2015	Mamelodi Sundowns		
2016	Alexandra’s Bluebirds		(1)
2019–	Mamelodi Sundowns		

International career^{‡}
2020–	South Africa		(3)
Medal record
Representing South Africa
COSAFA Women's Championship
Gold medal – first place	2020 South Africa
Silver medal – second place	2022 South Africa
CAF Women's Champions League
Gold medal – first place	2021 Egypt
Silver medal – second place	2022 Morocco
Gold medal – first place	2023 Côte d'Ivoire
COSAFA Women's Champions League
Gold medal – first place	2021 South Africa
Silver medal – second place	2022 South Africa
Gold medal – first place	2023 South Africa
- * Club domestic league appearances and goals as of 6 April 2025 ‡ National team caps and goals as of 6 April 2025

Nonhlanhla Mthandi (also Nhlanhla; born 19 August 1995) is a South African professional soccer player and football freestyler who plays as a midfielder for SAFA Women's League club Mamelodi Sundowns and the South African women's national team.

== Club career ==
=== Mamelodi Sundowns Ladies ===
In 2015, Mthandi joined Sasol Women's League side Mamelodi Sundowns Ladies.

=== Alexandra Bluebirds ===
In 2016, she left Sundowns Ladies and joined Sasol Women's League side Alexandra Bluebirds in order to get more game time. She scored on debut in an away match against Aqua Ladies.

=== Mamelodi Sundowns Ladies ===
In 2021, she was part of the treble winning Sundowns Ladies team. She scored in the final of the inaugural COSAFA Women's Champions League as they won 3-0 against Black Rhino Queens from Zimbabwe. This win qualified them to the CAF Women's Champions League held in Cairo, Egypt. The team won the inaugural CAF Women's Champions League. They completed the treble by defending their Hollywoodbets Super League title in December 2021.

In 2022, she starred in the clubs documentary Banyana ba Style: The First Queens of African Football. The film celebrates the journey of the Mamelodi Sundowns Ladies players as they achieved the historic milestone of claiming the first ever CAF Women’s Champions League.

They were runner's up for the 2022 COSAFA Women's Champions League and the 2022 CAF Women's Champions League. They won the Hollywoodbets Super League for the third consecutive year in November 2022.

In 2023, they won their second treble starting with the 2023 COSAFA Women's Champions League with Mthandi scoring twice in the tournament. They reclaimed their Champions League title when they won the 2023 CAF Women's Champions League. They completed the treble with the 2023 Hollywoodbets Super League title in December.

== International career ==
Mthandi competed for the South Africa women's national soccer team at the 2020 COSAFA Women's Championship where they were crowned champions. She was one of the scorers in the 7-0 crashing of Comoros at the tournament.

In 2022, she was part of the team that were runners-up to Zambia at the 2022 COSAFA Women's Championship.

She scored a brace in a 3–0 win over Malawi at Noko Matlou's final international game in April 2025. In 2026 she was part ot the team that finished as runners-up to Namibia in the 2025 COSAFA Women's Championship.

=== International goals ===
No.	Date	Venue	Opponent	Score	Result	Competition
1.	9 November 2020	Wolfson Stadium, Ibhayi, South Africa	Comoros	5–0	7–0	2020 COSAFA Women's Championship
2.	5 April 2025	UJ Soweto Stadium, Soweto, South Africa	Malawi	1–0	3–0	Friendly
3.	5 April 2025	UJ Soweto Stadium, Soweto, South Africa	Malawi	3–0	3–0	Friendly
4.	25 July 2025	Larbi Zaouli Stadium, Casablanca, Morocco	Ghana	1–0	1–1 (3–4 p)	2024 Women's Africa Cup of Nations
5.	2 December 2025	Adrar Stadium, Agadir, Morocco	Morocco	1–0	2–0	Friendly
6.	21 February 2026	Seshego Stadium, Seshego, South Africa	Angola	2–0	2–0	2025 COSAFA Women's Championship

== Honours ==
South Africa

- COSAFA Women's Championship: 2020; runner up: 2022, 2025

Mamelodi Sundowns Ladies

- CAF Women's Champions League: 2021, 2023; runners-up: 2022
- COSAFA Women's Champions League: 2021, 2023; runners-up 2022
- SAFA Women's League: 2020, 2021, 2022, 2023, 2024, 2025
