= List of Morocco women's international footballers =

This is a non-exhaustive list of Morocco women's international footballers – association football players who have appeared at least once for the senior Morocco women's national football team.

== Players ==
Key
**Bold**	Named to the national team in the past year

Name	Caps	Goals	National team years	Club(s)	Ref.
**Nour Imane Addi**		2+		(United States) South Alabama Jaguars	
**Nezha Aït Baba**		1+		Municipal Laâyoune (Note: Based in the disputed Western Sahara. Competes in Moroccan league.)	
**Hanane Aït El Haj**		1+		(Morocco) ASFAR	
**Kenza Allaoui**				(France) VGA Saint-Maur	
**Éva Allice**				(France) Nantes	
**Salma Amani**		1+		(France) Saint-Malo	
**Inès Arouaissa**				(France) Marseille	
**Rosella Ayane**		1+		(England) Leicester City	
**Najat Badri**				(Morocco) ASFAR	
Aïcha Barbou					
**Nouhaila Benzina**				(Morocco) ASFAR	
Ibtissam Bouharat					
**Siham Boukhami**				(Morocco) ASFAR	
Lamia Boumehdi					
**Zaina Bouzerrade**				(Netherlands) Ajax	
**Lina Chabane** (Note: Now represents Algeria.)				Unattached	
**Ghizlane Chebbak**				(Morocco) ASFAR	
**Zahra Cheeseman**				(United States) Colorado College Tigers	
**Ghizlane Chhiri**				(Morocco) ASFAR	
**Imène El Ghazouani**				(France) Yzeure	
**Khadija Er-Rmichi**				(Morocco) ASFAR	
**Inés Faddi**				(Spain) Granada	
Naïma Fadil					
**Soumia Hady**				(Morocco) CSMMF	
Meryem Hajri					
**Marwa Hassani**				(France) VGA Saint-Maur	
**Samya Hassani**				(Netherlands) Alkmaar	
Hind Jazouli					
**Ibtissam Jraidi**		2+		(Morocco) ASFAR	
**Hoda Khalaf**				(Sweden) Sätra	
Chirine Knaidil		1+			
**Yasmina Laaroussi**				(Switzerland) Servette	
Fatiha Lassiri					
**Rkia Mazrouai**				(Belgium) Gent	
**Sanaâ Mssoudy**				(Morocco) ASFAR	
Ouafae Nachâ					
**Élodie Nakkach**				(Switzerland) Servette	
**Nawëal Ouinekh**				(France) Saint-Étienne	
Khadija Oussat					
**Aziza Rebah**				(Morocco) ASFAR	
**Zineb Redouani**				(Morocco) ASFAR	
**Rania Salmi**		1+		(Morocco) Sporting Casablanca	
**Imane Saoud**		1+		(Switzerland) Basel	
**Sabah Seghir**				(Italy) Sampdoria	
**Ranya Senhaji**				(United States) South Carolina Gamecocks	
Faouz Skattou					
**Fatima Tagnaout**		2+		(Morocco) ASFAR	
Latifa Zarhoun					
**Assia Zouhair**				(Morocco) CAK	

== See also ==
- Morocco women's national football team
