= Lamia Boumehdi =

Moroccan football player and manager

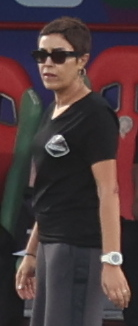
- Boumehdi during the 2024 CAF WCL final

Personal information
- Date of birth: 27 September 1983 (age 43)
- Place of birth: Berrechid, Morocco
- Height: 1.62 m (5 ft 4 in)
- Position: Forward

Team information
- Current team: Jordan Women (Coach)

Senior career*
Years	Team	Apps	(Gls)
1997–2008	FC Berrechid		
2008–2009	Sadaka SC		

International career^{‡}
1999–2009	Morocco		

Managerial career
- 2015–2016: Wydad Women
- 2017–2020: Morocco Women U17
- 2018–2020: Morocco Women U20
- 2020: Morocco Women
- 2023–2025: TP Mazembe Women
- 2025–2026: Morocco Women U20
- 2026–: Jordan Women
- * Club domestic league appearances and goals ‡ National team caps and goals as of 8 March 2008.

Lamia Boumehdi (Arabic: لمياء بومهدي) is a Moroccan football manager and former player who is the head coach of the Jordan women's national team. She played as a attacker and has captained the Morocco women's national team.

== Club career ==
Boumehdi has played for FC Berrechid in Morocco.

In 2024 she became the first woman to win the CAF Women's Champions League title when she led TP Mazembe to their maiden continental crown at the 2024 CAF Women's Champions League.

== International career ==
Boumehdi capped for Morocco at senior level during the 2000 African Women's Championship. Bouheddi is considered the youngest player to play for the Morocco women's national team at the age of 16 years.

== Managerial career ==
Boumehdi has coached the Morocco women's national under-20 football team.

=== IFFHS ===
In 2024 she was voted the 7th best Women's World Club Coach by IFFHS.

=== Jordan ===
On 15 March 2026, Boumehdi was announced as the new head coach for the Jordan women's national football team, making her the first Moroccan to take this position.

== Honours ==
=== Player ===
FC Berrechid

- Moroccan Women's Championship: 2005, 2006, 2008
- Moroccan Women Throne Cup: 2008
- UNAF Women's Club Tournament: 2007

SadaKa SC

- Lebanese Women's League: 2009
- Lebanese Women's FA Cup: 2009

=== Manager ===
Morocco women's U20

- African Games Third Place: 2019
- UNAF U-20 Women's Tournament: 2019

TP Mazembe

- CAF Women's Champions League: 2024
- Congolese Women's Championship: 2023, 2024
- UNIFFAC Zone Tournament: 2024

Individual

- CAF Women's Champions League Coach of the Tournament: 2024
- CAF Women's Coach of the Year: 2024 and 2025

== See also ==
- List of Morocco women's international footballers
