= Siham Boukhami =

Moroccan footballer

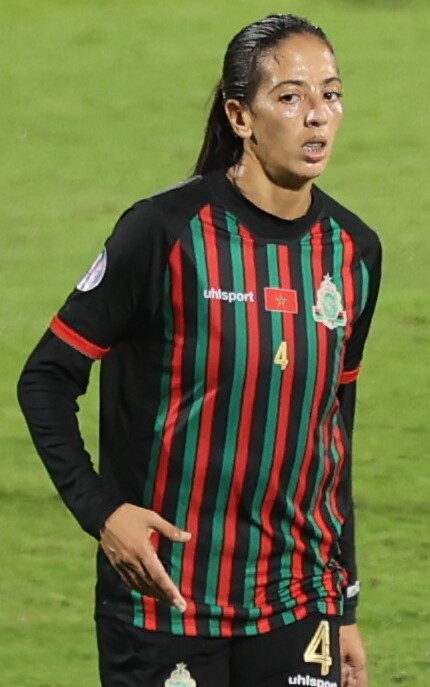
- Boukhami during the 2024 CAF WCL final.

Personal information
- Date of birth: 1 February 1992 (age 34)
- Height: 1.72 m (5 ft 8 in)
- Position: Defender

Team information
- Current team: AS FAR
- Number: 4

Senior career*
Years	Team	Apps	(Gls)
- AS FAR

International career^{‡}
2011–	Morocco		
Medal record
Representing Morocco
Women's Africa Cup of Nations
Second place	2022 Morocco
- * Club domestic league appearances and goals ‡ National team caps and goals as of 5 December 2023

Siham Boukhami (Arabic: سهام بوخامي; born 1 February 1992) is a Moroccan professional footballer who plays as a defender for AS FAR and the Morocco women's national team.

== Club career ==
Boukhami played with Al-Naseem Sports Club before she joined Atlas 05. Then, she moved to CM Laayoune for several seasons.

In 2018, Boukhami joined AS FAR, with whom she has won fiveMoroccan Championships (18/19, 19/20, 2021, 21/22, 22/23) and three Throne Cups (2019, 2020, 2022). She also participated in AS FAR's 3rd-place finish at the 2021 CAF Women's Champions League, as well as their 2022 victory.

== International career ==
Boukhami capped for Morocco at senior level during the 2018 Africa Women Cup of Nations qualification (first round).

Boukhami was named to the 26-player squad for the 2022 Africa Cup of Nations. She did not play in any of the matches. Morocco finished second, losing 1–2 to South Africa.

She was selected by Reynald Pedros to participate in a training camp for the 2023 Women's World Cup where Morocco faced Poland and Canada. She was not selected as part of Morocco's 2023 World Cup squad.

== International goals ==
No.	Date	Venue	Opponent	Score	Result	Competition
1.	11 June 2022	Prince Moulay Abdellah Stadium, Rabat, Morocco	Congo	3–0	7–0	Friendly

== See also ==
- List of Morocco women's international footballers
