= Nawëal Ouinekh =

Association football player (born 1997)

Personal information
- Full name: Nawëal Ouinekh-Youssouf
- Birth name: Nawëal Ouinekh
- Date of birth: 8 January 1997 (age 29)
- Place of birth: Bordeaux, France
- Height: 1.60 m (5 ft 3 in)
- Position: Forward

Team information
- Current team: Saint-Étienne
- Number: 28

Youth career
- 2013–2014: Blanquefort

Senior career*
Years	Team	Apps	(Gls)
2013–2015	Blanquefort	14	(0)
2015–2016	Arlac Mérignac	17	(5)
2016–2018	Bordeaux	24	(1)
2018	→ Ambilly (loan)	7	(0)
2018–2019	Orléans	17	(11)
2019–	Saint-Étienne	5	(1)

International career^{‡}
2016	France U19	2	(0)
2020–	Morocco	2	(0)
- * Club domestic league appearances and goals ‡ National team caps and goals as of 30 November 2020

Nawëal Ouinekh-Youssouf (born 8 January 1997), known as Nawëal Ouinekh, is a footballer who plays as a forward for Division 2 Féminine club Saint-Étienne and the Morocco national team.

Born in France, Ouinekh represented her native country internationally at youth level, before switching allegiance to Morocco in 2020.

== International career ==
Ouinekh made her senior debut for Morocco on 26 November 2020, against Ghana.

== Personal life ==
Ouinekh is married to Zaydou Youssouf.

== See also ==
- List of Morocco women's international footballers
