= Khadija Oussat =

Moroccan footballer

Personal information
- Place of birth: Morocco
- Position: Goalkeeper

Senior career*
Years	Team	Apps	(Gls)
- Khénifra

International career^{‡}
2008	Morocco	1+	(0+)
2011	United Arab Emirates	1+	(0)
- * Club domestic league appearances and goals ‡ National team caps and goals as of 10 October 2011.

Khadija Oussat is a Moroccan former footballer who played as a goalkeeper. She has been a member of the Morocco women's national team.

== Club career ==
Oussat has played for CA Khénifra in Morocco.

== International career ==
Oussat capped for Morocco at senior level on 8 March 2008 in a 0–6 friendly home lost to France.

== See also ==
- List of Morocco women's international footballers
