= Éva Allice =

Moroccan footballer (born 2002)

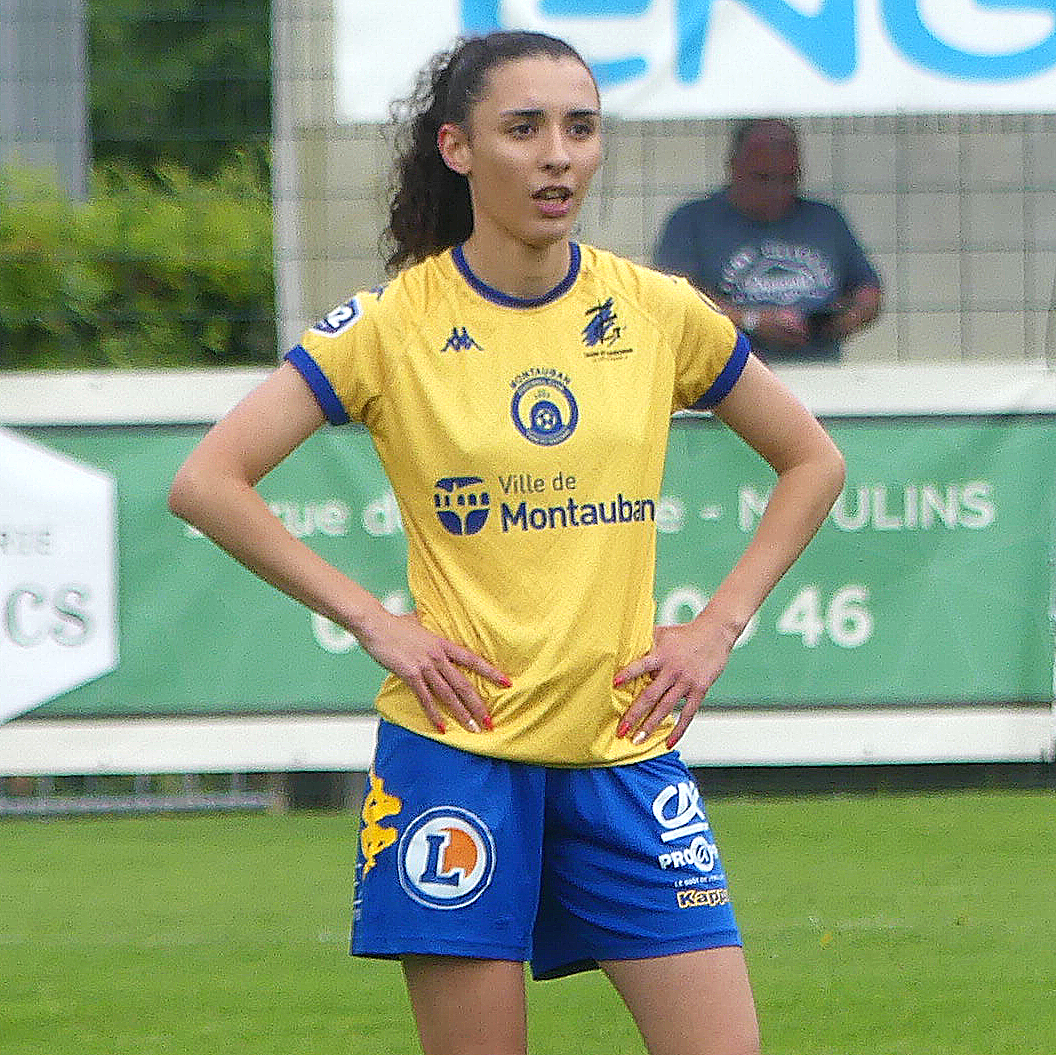

Personal information
- Date of birth: 2 January 2002 (age 24)
- Place of birth: Dreux, France
- Position: Defender

Youth career
- 2007–2008: FC Luray
- 2008–2013: FC Avrais Nonancourt
- 2013–2014: JS Coulaines
- 2014–2019: Le Mans

Senior career*
Years	Team	Apps	(Gls)
2017-2019	Le Mans	8	(0)
2019–2021	Nantes	2	(0)
2021–2022	Montauban FCTG	8	(0)
2022–2023	Le Mans	11	(0)

International career^{‡}
2018	France U16	5	(0)
2018	France U17	3	(0)
2021–	Morocco	1	(0)
Medal record
Representing Morocco
Women's Africa Cup of Nations
Second place	2022 Morocco
- * Club domestic league appearances and goals as of 22 September 2019. ‡ National team caps and goals as of 10 June 2021.

Éva Allice (Arabic: إيفا أليس, born 2 January 2002) is a footballer who plays as a defender. Born in France, she represents Morocco at international level.

== Club career ==
Allice has played for Le Mans FC and Nantes in France.

== International career ==
Allice made her senior debut for Morocco on 10 June 2021 in a 3–0 friendly home win over Mali.

== See also ==
- List of Morocco women's international footballers
