= Aziza Rabbah =

Moroccan footballer (born 1986)

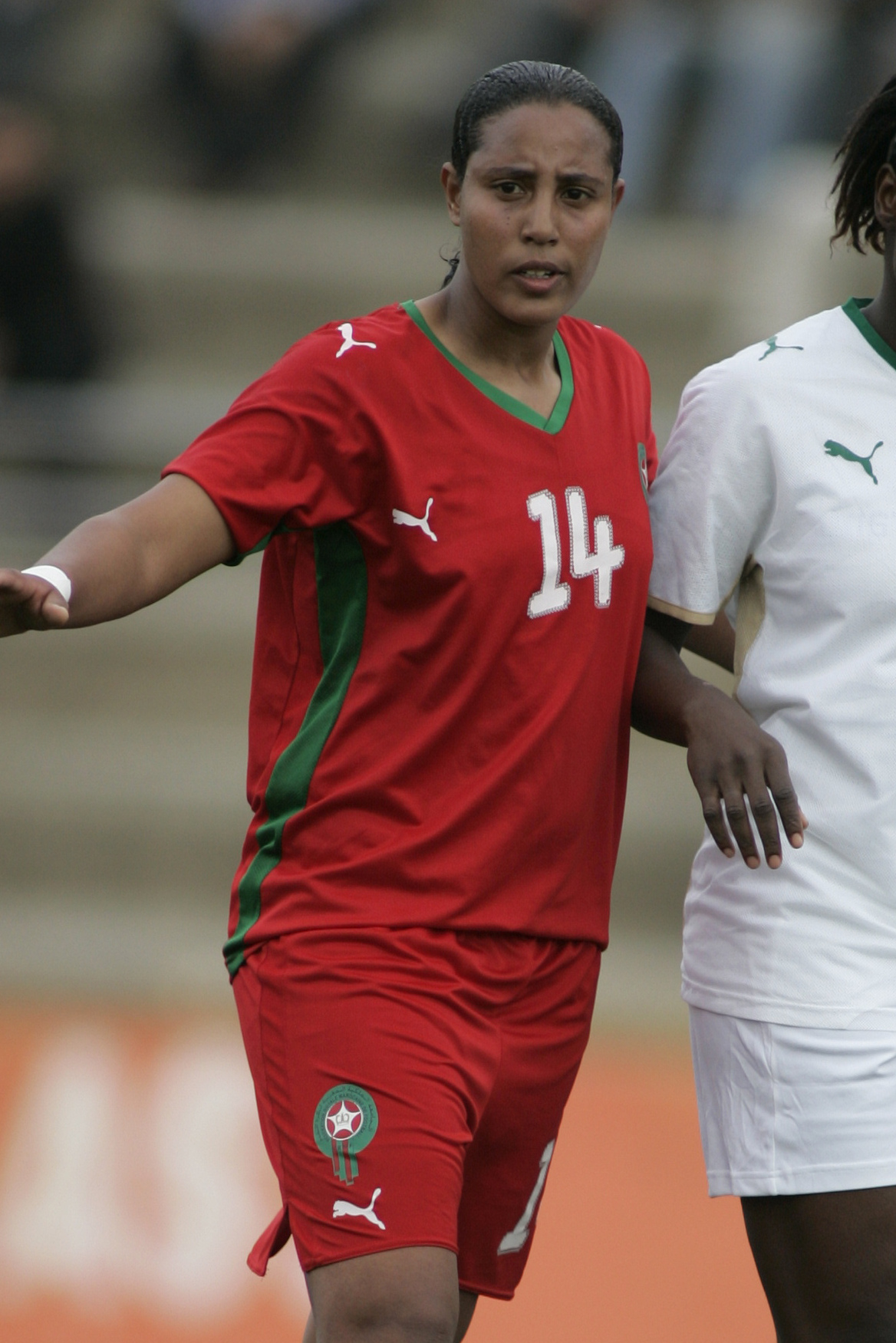
- Rabbah with Morocco in 2010

Personal information
- Date of birth: 4 July 1986 (age 40)
- Place of birth: Morocco
- Height: 1.74 m (5 ft 9 in)
- Position: Defender

Team information
- Current team: AS FAR
- Number: 14

Senior career*
| Years | Team | Apps | (Gls) |
| –2010 | FC Berrechid | | |
| 2010–2011 | CA Khénifra | | |
| 2011–2012 | Nassim Sidi Moumen | | |
| 2012– | AS FAR | | |

International career^{‡}
| 2006– | Morocco | | |
Medal record
Representing Morocco
Women's Africa Cup of Nations
| Second place | 2022 Morocco |
| Second place | 2024 Morocco |
- * Club domestic league appearances and goals ‡ National team caps and goals as of 18 July 2025

Aziza Rabbah (Arabic: عزيزة الرباح; born 4 July 1986) is a Moroccan professional footballer who plays as a defender for Moroccan Women's Championship club AS FAR, which she captains, and the Morocco national team.

== Club career ==
Rabbah played for FC Berrechid. She won the North African Championship, several Championships, and the 2008 Throne Cup with the club, before eventually joining for AS FAR.

With AS FAR, Rabbah has won 10 Championships beginning with the 2012/13 season, 8 Throne Cups, and the 2022 CAF Champions League. In 2021, AS FAR finished third in the CAF Champion's League.

== International career ==
Rabbah has regularly capped for Morocco at senior level since 2006. She has been involved in qualification efforts for multiple Africa Cup of Nations, World Cups, and Olympic Games.

She was selected by Reynald Pedros for the 2022 Women's Africa Cup of Nations. She was the oldest player in the squad at 36. Although she was on the bench for all of Morocco's matches, she did not play in the tournament. Morocco reached the finals and lost to South Africa, 2–1. However, Morocco did secure their first-ever qualification the 2023 Women's World Cup.

Rabbah was not selected as part of Morocco's 2023 World Cup squad.

== Honours ==
AS FAR

- Moroccan Women's Championship: 2013, 2014, 2016, 2017, 2018, 2019, 2020, 2021, 2022, 2023, 2024, 2025
- Moroccan Women Throne Cup: 2013, 2014, 2015, 2016, 2017, 2018, 2019, 2020, 2021, 2022, 2023, 2024
- UNAF Women's Champions League: 2021, 2024
- CAF Women's Champions League: 2022; runner-up: 2024

Individual

- Moroccan Women's Championship Best Player: 2014
- CAF Women's Champions League Team of the Tournament: 2022

== See also ==
- List of Morocco women's international footballers
