= Hind Hasnaoui =

Moroccan footballer (born 2007)

Personal information
- Date of birth: 13 September 1996 (age 30)
- Place of birth: Oued Zem, Morocco
- Height: 1.72 m (5 ft 8 in)
- Position: Goalkeeper

Team information
- Current team: Wydad

Senior career*
Years	Team	Apps	(Gls)
2015–	FAR		
2025–	→ JN Larache (loan)	10	(0)

International career^{‡}
2020–	Morocco	4	(0)
- * Club domestic league appearances and goals as of 6 July 2025 ‡ National team caps and goals as of 6 July 2025

Hind Hasnaoui (Arabic: هند حسناوي; born 8 August 2007) is a Moroccan professional footballer who plays as a goalkeeper for Moroccan Women's Championship D1 club AS FAR Rabat and the Morocco national team.

== Club career ==
Hasnaoui began her career at AS FAR. She is often used as a replacement for Khadija Er-Rmichi. She has won several Moroccan Women's Championship D1 titles and several Moroccan Women Throne Cups, as well as the 2022 CAF Women's Champions League (though she did not play a single match in the tournament).

Hasnaoui was loaned out to Jawharat Najm Larache for the 2023–24 season before returning to AS FAR. In that season, she played 10 matches and kept four clean sheets.

== International career ==
Hasnaoui is regularly called up to the Morocco national team as a second or third choice goalkeeper.

Hasnaoui was part of Morocco's 24-player squad for the 2024 Women's Africa Cup of Nations on home soil.
