= Sabah Seghir =

Moroccan footballer (born 2000)

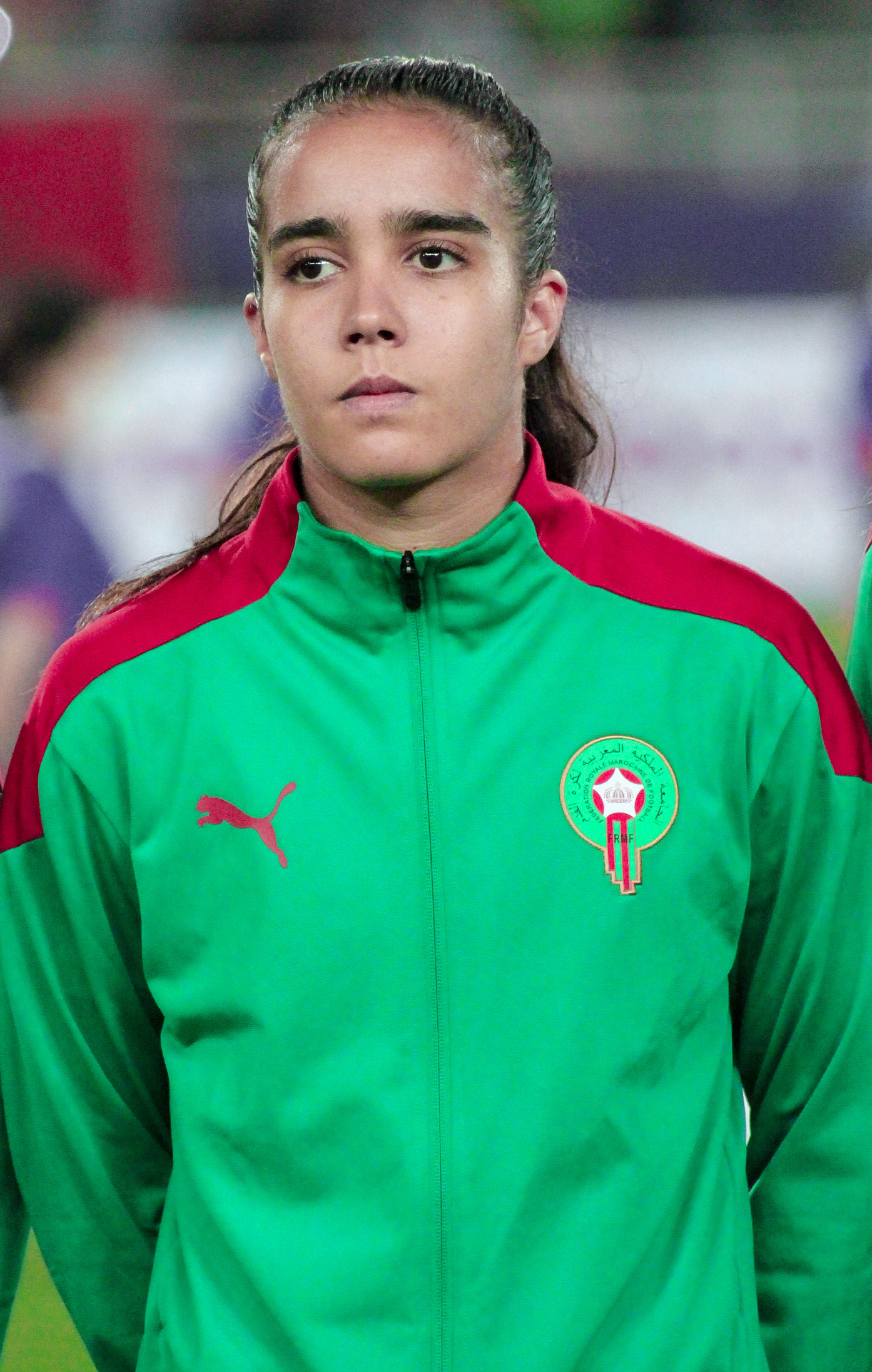
- Seghir with Morocco at the 2022 Women's Africa Cup of Nations

Personal information
- Date of birth: 27 September 2000 (age 26)
- Place of birth: Colombes, France
- Height: 1.63 m (5 ft 4 in)
- Positions: Midfielder; defender

Team information
- Current team: Freiburg
- Number: 9

Senior career*
Years	Team	Apps	(Gls)
2018–2019	RC Saint-Denis	32	(0)
2020–2021	Saint-Maur	5	(2)
2021–2023	Sampdoria	27	(1)
2023	→ Napoli (loan)	13	(1)
2023–2026	Basel	48	(2)
2026–	Freiburg	10	(1)

International career^{‡}
2021–	Morocco	20	(1)
Medal record
Representing Morocco
Women's Africa Cup of Nations
Second place	2022 Morocco
- * Club domestic league appearances and goals as of 22 November 2026. ‡ National team caps and goals as of 14 July 2026.

Sabah Seghir (Arabic: صباح صغير, born 27 September 2000) is a professional footballer who plays as a midfielder and defender for Frauen-Bundesliga club SC Freiburg. Born in France, she plays for the Morocco national team.

== Club career ==
Seghir has played for RC Saint-Denis and Saint-Maur in France. In season 2021–22 she played for the Italian Serie A club UC Sampdoria, while in the second part of season 2022–23 she played on loan for the Serie B club Napoli, gaining the promotion by winning the league. In July 2026, Seghir joined German Bundesliga club SC Freiburg.

== International career ==
Seghir made her senior debut for Morocco on 10 June 2021, as a substitute in a 3–0 friendly home win over Mali. Her first match as a starter player was four days later against the same opponent.

== International goals ==
No.	Date	Venue	Opponent	Score	Result	Competition
1.	11 June 2022	Prince Moulay Abdellah Stadium, Rabat, Morocco	Congo	2–0	7–0	Friendly

== See also ==
- List of Morocco women's international footballers
