= DR Congo women's football championship =

Highest division of league competition for Congolese women's football

- Founded: 2008; 18 years ago
- Country: Democratic Republic of the Congo
- Confederation: CAF
- Number of clubs: 26
- Level on pyramid: 1
- International cup: CAF Champions League
- Current champions: FA M'sichana (1st title) (2024–25)
- Most championships: OCL City (5 titles)

The Congolese Women's Championship or Ligue nationale de Football féminin, abbreviated as LINAFF, is a Congolese women's football competition organized by the Congolese Association Football Federation (FECOFA).

Despite being established in 2008, this national-scale competition faces challenges in gaining widespread popularity in a vast country where local and provincial women's football championships remain highly popular. The competition takes place annually from May to June and involves a championship format where the champions of different provincial women's football commissions compete. At the end of the season, the top team is crowned champion and qualifies for the CAF Women's Champions League.

The Olympique Club Lubumbashi City, also known as "OCL City," from the province of Haut-Katanga (formerly Katanga), holds the most titles in this competition, having won five (5) titles since its inception in 2008.

== History ==
During the first four editions of the Congolese national women's football championship (2008, 2009, 2010, and 2011), the provincial associations and commissions competed to determine the winning province in this annual competition. It was only from the year 2012 that teams from different urban associations and provincial commissions started competing in their respective provinces to qualify for the "Coupe du Congo féminine," organized by the national women's football league "LINAFF."

Since 2008, five clubs have won the championship: the most successful being Olympique Club Lubumbashi City (5 titles), followed by Bafana Bafana, Attaque sans recul, FCF Amani de Kinshasa, and FCF Mazembe de Lubumbashi, each with 1 title.

Starting from 2022, the winner of this competition qualifies for the CAF Women's Champions League. The Democratic Republic of the Congo was represented for the first time by FCF Amani from the city of Kinshasa, the winner of the 12th edition of the championship, in the CAF Women's Champions League. However, the team was eliminated during the 2021 CAF Women's Champions League UNIFFAC Qualifiers.

In the following year, TP Mazembe (champion of the 13th edition of the national women's championship) succeeded FCF Amani and played the 2022 CAF Women's Champions League UNIFFAC Qualifiers, which they won, securing their place in the final phase of the 2022 CAF Women's Champions League. Their first participation proved successful as they qualified for the final of the UNIFFAC qualifiers by defeating CECUS FC from Chad with a convincing 4–0 victory. In the group stage of the CAF Women's Champions League, TP Mazembe started well with a 1–0 victory against Wadi Degla (Egypt), thanks to an early goal scored by Merveille Kanjinga. In the second match, however, Mazembe suffered a 2–0 defeat against Mamelodi Sundowns, which put them in 3rd place in Group B. Bayelsa Queens emerged as the top team with 9 points, followed by Bayelsa Queens with 6 points, while TP Mazembe had 3 points and Wadi Degla remained scoreless. Despite their efforts, Mazembe couldn't overcome the Sundowns' defense and suffered a 4–0 loss. Nonetheless, the team made a remarkable debut in the competition.

The 14th edition of the championship was organized in the Haut-Katanga province (Lubumbashi). Two stadiums, Stade TP Mazembe and Stade Gaëtan Kakudji, were selected for the organization of the national women's championship, while Stade Kibasa Maliba was closed for rehabilitation to meet CAF standards for approval. Due to organizational and financial issues, some clubs did not participate in the 14th edition of the national women's championship, held in Lubumbashi from May 25 to June 25, 2023. Teams from Kinshasa, including FCF Amini, CSF Bikira, CFF Don Bosco, and Espoir de Kinshasa, decided not to take part in this edition, and some teams from other regions couldn't afford to travel to Lubumbashi due to financial constraints. On the other hand, TP Mazembe de Lubumbashi, the champion of the urban women's football association in Lubumbashi, the provincial commission of Haut-Katanga, and the 13th edition of the Coupe du Congo féminine, bid farewell to the competition after two consecutive defeats.

== Clubs ==
=== 2023–24 season ===
Twenty six teams were selected for the competition, representing ten provinces of the Democratic Republic of the Congo. Three groups have been formed, two with 10 teams each, and another with 6 teams.

==== Group A ====
Club	Provinces
TP Mazembe	Haut-Katanga
JSK	Lualaba
Manika	Lualaba
Lusenda Giris	Kivu
DC Bweremana	Kivu
Fondation Jacques Kyabula Katwe	Haut-Katanga
AS Kabasha	Kivu
FCF Mazembe	Kasaï Central
FCF Lupopo	Haut-Katanga

==== Group B ====
Club	Provinces
FCF Tosepela	Ituri
FCF Force des filles	Kivu
31ème CPC	Kasaï Central
FCF Amani	Kinshasa
DCMP Bikira	Haut-Katanga
FCF Okapi	Kivu
Ituri FC	Ituri
FCF Mabanga	Ituri
Soleil de l’Est	Kivu
Muselamayi	Kasaï Central

==== Group C ====
Club	Provinces
OCK de Kasaji	Lualaba
Sainte Marie de Lulua	Kasaï Central
CSF Bikira	Kinshasa
Inter Star de la Tshopo	Tshopo
ASF Espoir de Kinshasa	Kinshasa
CFF Don Bosco	Kinshasa

=== Champions ===
Season	Champion	Runner-up
Regional Provincial Selections Leagues
2004		
2005		
2006		
2007		
National Provincial Selections League
2008	Nord-Kivu	Kinshasa
2009	Kinshasa	Nord-Kivu
2010	Kinshasa	Nord-Kivu
2011	Katanga	
National League
2012	OCL City	Mpambu
2013	OCL City	Bafana Bafana
2014	OCL City	Attaque sans recul
2015	OCL City	Attaque sans recul
2016	Attaque sans recul	OCL City
2017	Bafana Bafana	DCMP/Bikira
2018	Cancelled	
2019	OCL City	Espoir de Bandal
2020	Cancelled	
2021	FC Amani	CFS Bikira
2022	TP Mazembe	CFS Bikira
2023	TP Mazembe	DC Bweremana
2024	TP Mazembe	FCF Amani
2025	FA M'sichana	CFS Bikira
2026	Cancelled	
2027		
