= 2022 CAF Women's Champions League UNIFFAC Qualifiers =

Tournament details
- Host country: Equatorial Guinea
- City: Malabo
- Dates: 10–16 September 2022
- Teams: 5 (from 5 associations)
- Venue: 1

Final positions
- Champions: (Democratic Republic of the Congo) TP Mazembe (1st title)
- Runners-up: (Cameroon) AS Awa

Tournament statistics
- Matches played: 4
- Goals scored: 11 (2.75 per match)
- Top scorer: (Democratic Republic of the Congo) Merveille Kanjinga (4 goals)

The 2022 CAF Women's Champions League UNIFFAC Qualifiers is the 2nd edition of CAF Women's Champions League UNIFFAC Qualifiers tournament organised by the UNIFFAC for the women's clubs of association nations. This edition was originally to be held from 20 August to 4 September 2022 in the Cameroonian capital Yaoundé. However on 11 August the competition was postponed indefinitely following the lack of guarantee from the government of the Republic of Cameroon, the new dates and hosts will be fixed by UNIFFAC. On 24 August 2022 it was announced that Equatorial Guinea will host the tournament starting from 10 september. The winners of the tournament qualified for the 2022 CAF Women's Champions League.

== Venues ==
Matches are held at the Estadio de Malabo.

Malabo	2022 CAF Women's Champions League UNIFFAC Qualifiers (Equatorial Guinea)
Estadio de Malabo	2022 CAF Women's Champions League UNIFFAC Qualifiers (Equatorial Guinea)
Capacity: 15 250	2022 CAF Women's Champions League UNIFFAC Qualifiers (Equatorial Guinea)

== Participating teams ==
The following five teams will contest in the qualifying tournament.

Team	Qualifying method	Appearances	Previous best performance
(Cameroon) AS Awa	2021–22 Cameroonian Women's champions	1st	n/a
(Democratic Republic of the Congo) TP Mazembe	2021–22 Congolese Democratic Rep. Women's champions	1st	n/a
(Equatorial Guinea) Malabo Kings FC	2020–21 Equatorial Guinean Women's champions	2nd	Winner (2021)
(Chad) CECUS FC	2021–22 Tchadien Women's champions	1st	n/a
(Republic of the Congo) AC Colombe	2021–22 Congolaise Women's champions	1st	n/a

Associations which did not enter a team

Central African Republic
Gabon
São Tomé and Príncipe

== Draw ==
The draw for this edition of the tournament was held on 6 september 2022 in Cairo, Egypt.

Bye to First round	Participating in First round
(Equatorial Guinea) Malabo Kings FC	(Cameroon) AS Awa (Democratic Republic of the Congo) TP Mazembe (Republic of the Congo) AC Colombe (W) (Chad) CECUS FC

== Qualifying tournament ==
=== First round ===
Team 1	Score	Team 2
CECUS FC (Chad)	w/o	(Republic of the Congo) AC Colombe
AS Awa (Cameroon)	0–1	(Democratic Republic of the Congo) TP Mazembe

10 September 2022
13:00 UTC+1

CECUS FC (Chad)	Cancelled	(Republic of the Congo) AC Colombe
	Report

Estadio de Malabo, Malabo, Equatorial Guinea
Referee: Aline Guimbang A Etong (Cameroon)

CECUS FC won on walkover after AC Colombe failed to appear on the pitch.

10 September 2022
16:00 UTC+1

AS Awa (Cameroon)	0–1	(Democratic Republic of the Congo) TP Mazembe
	Report	Kanjinga 55'

Estadio de Malabo, Malabo, Equatorial Guinea
Referee: Richy Carmen Nganda Madiamba (Gabon)

=== Second round ===
Team 1	Score	Team 2
CECUS FC (Chad)	0–4	(Democratic Republic of the Congo) TP Mazembe
Malabo Kings (Equatorial Guinea)	0–3	(Cameroon) AS Awa FC

13 September 2022
13:00 UTC+1

CECUS FC (Chad)	0–4	(Democratic Republic of the Congo) TP Mazembe
	Report	Kanjinga 1', 19'; Dikisha 30'; Bousu 85'

Estadio de Malabo, Malabo, Equatorial Guinea
Referee: Agnès Ngoma (Congo)
13 September 2022
16:00 UTC+1

Malabo Kings (Equatorial Guinea)	0–3	(Cameroon) AS Awa
	Report	Enganemben 34'; Kouesso 40'; Tabe 46'

Estadio de Malabo, Malabo, Equatorial Guinea

=== Final ===
Team 1	Score	Team 2
TP Mazembe (Democratic Republic of the Congo)	2–1	(Cameroon) AS Awa

16 September 2022
15:30 UTC+1

TP Mazembe (Democratic Republic of the Congo)	2–1	(Cameroon) AS Awa
Bousu 32'; Kanjinga 87'	Report	Machia 52'

Estadio de Malabo, Malabo, Equatorial Guinea
Referee: Agnès Ngoma (Congo)

== Statistics ==
=== Goalscorers ===
There have been 11 goals scored in 4 matches, for an average of 2.75 goals per match (as of 16 September 2022).

Rank	Player	Team	Goals
1	(Democratic Republic of the Congo) Merveille Kanjinga	(Democratic Republic of the Congo) TP Mazembe	4
2	(Democratic Republic of the Congo) Justine Bousu	(Democratic Republic of the Congo) TP Mazembe	2
3	(Democratic Republic of the Congo) Esther Dikisha	(Democratic Republic of the Congo) TP Mazembe	1
3	(Cameroon) Farida Machia	(Cameroon) AS Awa	1
3	(Cameroon) Felicia Enganemben	(Cameroon) AS Awa	1
3	(Cameroon) Jeanne Kouesso	(Cameroon) AS Awa	1
3	(Cameroon) Brenda Tabe	(Cameroon) AS Awa	1
