= CAF Awards =

African football awards

- CAF Awards logo
- Presented by: Confederation of African Football (CAF)
- First award: 1992; 34 years ago
- Website: cafonline.com

The CAF Awards is an annual ceremony organised by the Confederation of African Football (CAF) to recognise outstanding achievements in African association football. The event honours players, coaches, teams, and other contributors within the continent’s football landscape.

== History ==
The CAF Awards was first introduced in 2000 by the Confederation of African Football to recognise the continent’s leading performers across various categories. The African Footballer of the Year distinction predates the broader awards programme, having been presented since 1992, when Abedi Pele received the inaugural honour.

== Current awards ==
The awards include:

=== CAF Player of the Year ===
Current winner:

Year	Player	National team	Club
2025	Achraf Hakimi	Morocco	(France) Paris Saint-Germain

=== CAF Female Player of the Year ===
Current winner:

Year	Player	National team	Club
2025	Ghizlane Chebbak	Morocco	(Saudi Arabia) Al-Hilal

=== CAF Youth Player of the Year ===
Year	Player	National team	Club
2025	Othmane Maamma	Morocco	(England) Watford
2024	Lamine Camara	Senegal	(France) Monaco
2023	Lamine Camara	Senegal	(France) Metz
2022	Pape Matar Sarr	Senegal	(England) Tottenham Hotspur
2019	Achraf Hakimi	Morocco	(Germany) Borussia Dortmund
2018	Achraf Hakimi	Morocco	(Germany) Borussia Dortmund
2017	Patson Daka	Zambia	(Austria) FC Liefering
2016	Alex Iwobi	Nigeria	(England) Arsenal
2015	Victor Osimhen	Nigeria	(Nigeria) Ultimate Strikers Academy

=== CAF Youth Women's Player of the Year ===
Year	Player	National team	Club
2025	Doha El Madani	Morocco	(Morocco) AS FAR
2024	Doha El Madani	Morocco	(Morocco) AS FAR
2023	Nesryne El Chad	Morocco	(France) Lille
2022	Evelyn Badu	Ghana	(Ghana) Hasaacas
2014	Asisat Oshoala	Nigeria	(Nigeria) Rivers Angels

=== African Inter-Club Player of the Year (Based in Africa) ===
It replaced African Champions League Best Player in 2005.

Year	Player	National team	Club
2025	Fiston Mayele	DR Congo	(Egypt) Pyramids FC
2024	Ronwen Williams	South Africa	(South Africa) Mamelodi Sundowns
2023	Percy Tau	South Africa	(Egypt) Al Ahly
2022	Mohamed El Shenawy	Egypt	(Egypt) Al Ahly
2019	Youcef Belaïli	Algeria	(Tunisia) Espérance de Tunis
2016	Denis Onyango	Uganda	(South Africa) Mamelodi Sundowns
2015	Mbwana Samatta	Tanzania	(Democratic Republic of the Congo) TP Mazembe
2014	Firmin Ndombe Mubele	DR Congo	(Democratic Republic of the Congo) Vita Club
2013	Mohamed Aboutrika	Egypt	(Egypt) Al Ahly
2012	Mohamed Aboutrika	Egypt	(Egypt) Al Ahly
2011	Oussama Darragi	Tunisia	(Tunisia) Espérance de Tunis
2010	Ahmed Hassan	Egypt	(Egypt) Al Ahly
2009	Trésor Mputu	DR Congo	(Democratic Republic of the Congo) TP Mazembe
2008	Mohamed Aboutrika	Egypt	(Egypt) Al Ahly
2007	Amine Chermiti	Tunisia	(Tunisia) Étoile du Sahel
2006	Mohamed Aboutrika	Egypt	(Egypt) Al Ahly
2005	Mohamed Barakat	Egypt	(Egypt) Al Ahly

==== African Champions League Best Player (earlier version of African Inter-Club Player of the Year) ====
Year	Player	National team	Club
2004	Vincent Enyeama	Nigeria	(Nigeria) Enyimba
2003	Dramane Traoré	Mali	(Egypt) Ismaily
2002	Hicham Aboucherouane	Morocco	(Morocco) Raja Casablanca
2001	Flávio	Angola	(Angola) Petro de Luanda

=== African Women's Inter-Club Player of the Year (Based in Africa) ===
Year	Player	National team	Club
2025	Sanaâ Mssoudy	Morocco	(Morocco) AS FAR
2024	Sanaâ Mssoudy	Morocco	(Morocco) AS FAR
2023	Fatima Tagnaout	Morocco	(Morocco) AS FAR
2022	Evelyn Badu	Ghana	(Ghana) Hasaacas

=== CAF Goalkeeper of the Year ===
Year	Player	National team	Club
2025	Yassine Bounou	Morocco	(Saudi Arabia) Al-Hilal
2024	Ronwen Williams	South Africa	(South Africa) Mamelodi Sundowns
2023	Yassine Bounou	Morocco	(Spain) Sevilla
2004	Ali Boumnijel	Tunisia	(France) Rouen
2003	Carlos Kameni	Cameroon	(Spain) Espanyol
2002	Tony Sylva	Senegal	(France) Monaco

=== CAF Women's Goalkeeper of the Year ===
Year	Player	National team	Club
2025	Chiamaka Nnadozie	Nigeria	(England) Brighton & Hove Albion
2024	Chiamaka Nnadozie	Nigeria	(France) Paris FC
2023	Chiamaka Nnadozie	Nigeria	(France) Paris FC

=== CAF Coach of the Year ===
Year	Coach	Team managed
2025	(Cape Verde) Bubista	Cape Verde
2024	(Ivory Coast) Emerse Faé	Ivory Coast
2023	(Morocco) Walid Regragui	Morocco
2022	(Senegal) Aliou Cissé	Senegal
2019	(Algeria) Djamel Belmadi	Algeria
2018	(France) Hervé Renard	Morocco
2017	(Argentina) Héctor Cúper	Egypt
2016	(South Africa) Pitso Mosimane	(South Africa) Mamelodi Sundowns
2015	(France) Hervé Renard	Ivory Coast
2014	(Algeria) Kheïreddine Madoui	(Algeria) ES Sétif
2013	(Nigeria) Stephen Keshi	Nigeria
2012	(France) Hervé Renard	Zambia
2011	(Niger) Harouna Doula	Niger
2010	(Serbia) Milovan Rajevac	Ghana
2009	(Ghana) Sellas Tetteh	Ghana U20
2008	(Egypt) Hassan Shehata	Egypt
2007	(Nigeria) Yemi Tella	Nigeria U17
2006	(Portugal) Manuel José	(Egypt) Al Ahly
2005	(Nigeria) Stephen Keshi	Togo
2004	(Nigeria) Okey Emordi	(Nigeria) Enyimba
2003	(Nigeria) Kadiri Ikhana	(Nigeria) Enyimba
2002	(France) Bruno Metsu	Senegal
2001	(France) Bruno Metsu	Senegal
2000	(Ghana) Cecil Jones Attuquayefio	(Ghana) Hearts of Oak

=== CAF Women's Coach of the Year ===
Year	Coach	Team managed
2025	(Morocco) Lamia Boumehdi	(Democratic Republic of the Congo) TP Mazembe
2024	(Morocco) Lamia Boumehdi	(Democratic Republic of the Congo) TP Mazembe
2023	(South Africa) Desiree Ellis	South Africa
2022	(South Africa) Desiree Ellis	South Africa
2019	(South Africa) Desiree Ellis	South Africa
2018	(South Africa) Desiree Ellis	South Africa

=== African Club of the Year ===
Current Men's winner:

Year	Club
2025	(Egypt) Pyramids FC

Current Women's winner:

Year	Club
2025	(Morocco) AS FAR

=== African National Team of the Year ===
Current Men's winner:

Year	Club
2025	Morocco U-20

Current Women's winner:

Year	Club
2025	Nigeria

=== African Goal of the Year ===
Year	Player	Country
2025	Clement Mzize	Tanzania
2024	Mabululu	Angola
2023	Kahraba	Egypt
2022	Pape Ousmane Sakho	Senegal
2019	Riyad Mahrez	Algeria
2018	Thembi Kgatlana	South Africa
2004	Benni McCarthy	South Africa
2003	Lesley Manyathela	South Africa
2002	Papa Bouba Diop	Senegal
2001	Zoubeir Baya	Tunisia

=== CAF Referee of the Year ===
Year	Referee	Country
2025	Omar Artan	Somalia
2024	Mutaz Ibrahim	Libya
2016	Bakary Gassama	Gambia
2015	Bakary Gassama	Gambia
2014	Bakary Gassama	Gambia
2013	Djamel Haimoudi	Algeria
2012	Djamel Haimoudi	Algeria
2011	Noumandiez Doué	Ivory Coast

=== CAF Women Referee of the Year ===
Year	Referee	Country
2025	Shamirah Nabadda	Uganda
2024	Bouchra Karboubi	Morocco

=== CAF outstanding achievement award ===
- 2025: Their Excellency William Ruto, Yoweri Museveni and Samia Suluhu Hassan
- 2024: Their Excellency Abdel Fattah El-Sisi and Paul Biya
- 2023: His Excellency Macky Sall (President of the Republic of Senegal)
- 2022: His Majesty King Mohammed VI of Morocco

=== Platinum Award ===
- 2019: Kodjovi Obilale (former Togolese goalkeeper)
- 2018: His Excellency Macky Sall (President of the Republic of Senegal)
- 2017: Nana Akufo-Addo (President of Ghana)
- 2017: George Weah (President-elect of Liberia and former World, Africa and European Player of the Year)
- 2016: Son Excellence Muhammadu Buhari (President of Nigeria)

== Defunct awards ==
The following are no longer awarded.

=== CAF Most Promising Talent of the Year ===
Year	Player	National team	Club
2016	Kelechi Iheanacho	Nigeria	(England) Manchester City
2015	Etebo Oghenekaro	Nigeria	(Nigeria) Warri Wolves
2014	Yacine Brahimi	Algeria	(Portugal) Porto
2013	Kelechi Iheanacho	Nigeria	(England) Manchester City
2012	Mohamed Salah	Egypt	(Switzerland) Basel
2011	Souleymane Coulibaly	Ivory Coast	(England) Tottenham Hotspur
2010	Kwadwo Asamoah	Ghana	(Italy) Udinese
2009	Dominic Adiyiah	Ghana	(Italy) Milan
2008	Salomon Kalou	Ivory Coast	(England) Chelsea
2007	Clifford Mulenga	Zambia	(South Africa) Pretoria University
2006	Taye Taiwo	Nigeria	(France) Marseille
2005	Mikel John Obi	Nigeria	(England) Chelsea
2004	Obafemi Martins	Nigeria	(Italy) Internazionale
2003	Obafemi Martins	Nigeria	(Italy) Internazionale
2002	Mido	Egypt	(Netherlands) Ajax
2001	Mantorras	Angola	(Portugal) Benfica

=== CAF Legends award ===
Year	Legend	Role	Country
2018	Mohamed Aboutrika	Player	Egypt
2017	Ibrahim Sunday	Manager	Ghana
2016	Laurent Pokou Emilienne Mbango	Players	Ivory Coast Cameroon
2015	Charles Gyamfi Samuel Mbappé Léppé	Manager Player	Ghana Cameroon
2014	Oryx Douala; Stade Malien	Clubs	Cameroon; Mali
2013	Bruno Metsu	Manager	France
2012	Rigobert Song Mahmoud El-Gohary	Player Manager	Cameroon Egypt
2011	Mustapha Hadji Jay-Jay Okocha	Players	Morocco Nigeria
2009	Jesus Stephen Keshi Jules Bocandé	Players	Angola Nigeria Senegal
2008	Christian Chukwu	Player	Nigeria
2005	Rabah Madjer	Player	Algeria
2004	Pierre Kalala Mukendi Mahmoud El Khatib George Weah	Players	DR Congo Egypt Liberia
2003	Roger Milla Salif Keïta Kalusha Bwalya	Players	Cameroon Mali Zambia

=== President of the Year ===
Year	President	Team
2019	Moïse Katumbi	(Democratic Republic of the Congo) TP Mazembe
2018	Fouzi Lekjaa	Morocco
2017	Ahmed Yahya	Mauritania
2016	Manuel Lopes Nascimento	Guinea-Bissau
2015	Abdiqani Said Arab	Somalia

=== Federation of the Year ===
Year	Federation	Country
2019	Egyptian Football Association	Egypt

== Editions ==
The 2020 and 2021 CAF awards did not take place due to the spread of the COVID-19 pandemic.

On 19 November 2025, CAF announced that the 2025 CAF Awards ceremony will take place in Rabat, Morocco. Following the earthquake that occurred in the region, and in order to show solidarity, a friendly match between African Legends was organized.

== See also ==
- African Footballer of the Year
- FIFA World Player of the Year
- Ballon d'Or
- Asian Footballer of the Year
- Oceania Footballer of the Year
- Onze d'Or
- World Soccer (magazine)
