= Fatima Tagnaout =

Moroccan footballer

Fatima Tagnaout فاطمة تكناوت (Arabic)
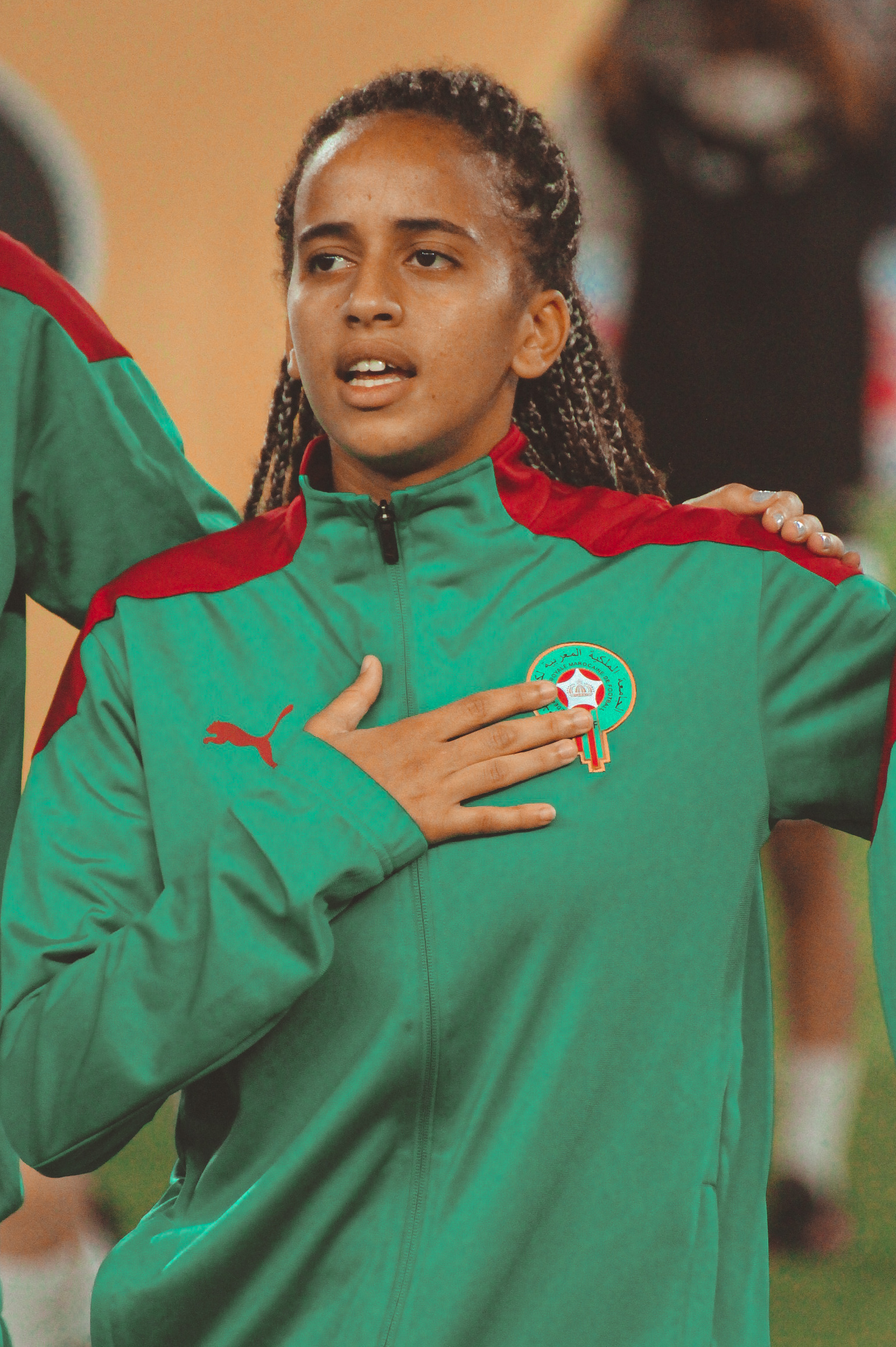
- Tagnaout with Morocco at the 2022 Women's Africa Cup of Nations

Personal information
- Full name: Fatima Zahra Tagnaout
- Date of birth: 20 January 1999 (age 27)
- Place of birth: Casablanca, Morocco
- Height: 1.58 m (5 ft 2 in)
- Position: Midfielder

Team information
- Current team: AS FAR
- Number: 7

Youth career
- –2015: AJS

Senior career*
Years	Team	Apps	(Gls)
2015–2024	AS FAR		
2024	Sevilla		
2024–	AS FAR		

International career^{‡}
2015–2016	Morocco U17		
2017–2020	Morocco U20		
2017–	Morocco		
Medal record
Representing Morocco
UNAF Women's Tournament
Winner	2020 Tunisia
Women's Africa Cup of Nations
Runner-up	2022 Morocco
Runner-up	2024 Morocco
- * Club domestic league appearances and goals ‡ National team caps and goals as of 29 October 2024 (UTC)

Fatima Zahra Tagnaout (Arabic: فاطمة الزهراء تاكناوت; born 20 January 1999) is a Moroccan professional footballer who plays as a midfielder for AS FAR and the Morocco women's national team.

== Early life ==
Originally from the Tata region, Tagnaout was born in Casablanca.

After having spent a long time around boys, and playing with the AJS club in Sidi Maârouf, she received offers to participate in detection days in Rabat where she quickly integrated into the AS FAR women's team.

== Club career ==
Tagnaout has played for AS FAR in Morocco since she was 15. She has won 8 Championships and 6 Throne Cups.

Tagnaout played in the inaugural CAF Women's Champions League which took place in Egypt in 2021. She participated in all of the games. She recorded a goal in the third-place match and provided several assists throughout the tournament. She was named to the Team of the Tournament.

She was chosen by the CAF Awards Committee as a finalist for the African Club Player of the Year 2022 but did not win the award.

Morocco hosted the 2022 CAF Women's Champions League. AS FAR won the final match at the expense of the defending champions, Mamelodi Sundowns, with a score of 4–0. Tagnaout scored the first goal on a penalty kick and received a yellow card. Throughout the tournament, Tagnaout had three goals and three assists. She was named Best Player and to the Team of the Tournament.

On 14 November 2023, Tagnaout was nominated for the 2023 African Player of the Year and 2023 Interclub Player of the Year by CAF. A month later, she won the Women's Interclub Player of the Year award.

Tagnaout scored the first goal of the 2026 CAF Women's Champions League. She scored her goal of the tournament against USFAS Bamako and was included in the group stage Best XI for her performances.

== International career ==
=== Morocco U-17 ===
Tagnaout played for the Morocco U-17 women in the African qualifiers for the FIFA U-17 Women's World Cup.

=== Morocco U-20 ===
Tagnaout played in a number of matches with the Morocco U-20 national team, including African qualifiers for the 2018 U-20 Women's World Cup. After eliminating Senegal in the first round, Morocco lost in the second round to Nigeria. The score was 1-5 and the only goal for Morocco was scored by Tagnaout.

She participated in December 2019 in a UNAF U-20 Tournament in Algeria where she played two matches against Burkina Faso and Algeria.

=== Senior team ===
Tagnaout has capped for Morocco at senior level. She was first called up to play for the national team in 2018. She registered her first two international goals on 31 January 2020 in a friendly against Tunesia. In September 2021, she participated in the Aisha Bukhari cup, during which she scored a goal against Cameroon in the 78th minute.

She was chosen by Reynald Pedros to play in the 2022 Women's Africa Cup of Nations. She participated in all matches and was awarded the title of Woman of the Match for the match against Senegal. Morocco finished as runners-up.

She was selected as part of Morocco's 2023 Women's World Cup squad. She started all three games of the group stage.

== Career statistics ==
International goals

Scores and results list Morocco's goal tally first

No.	Date	Venue	Opponent	Score	Result	Competition	Ref.
1	31 January 2020	Stade Municipal de Témara, Temara, Morocco	Tunisia	3–1	6–3	Friendly	
2	31 January 2020	Stade Municipal de Témara, Temara, Morocco	Tunisia	4–2	6–3	Friendly	

== Honours ==
AS FAR

- Moroccan Women's Championship (11): 2016, 2017, 2018, 2019, 2020, 2021, 2022, 2023, 2024, 2025, 2026
- Moroccan Women Throne Cup (10): 2016, 2017, 2018, 2019, 2020, 2021, 2022, 2023, 2024, 2025
- UNAF Women's Champions League (1): 2021
- CAF Women's Champions League (2): 2022, 2026

Morocco

- Women's Africa Cup of Nations runner-up: 2022, 2024
- UNAF Women's Tournament: 2020

Individual

- Moroccan Women's Championship Best Player: 2021
- CAF Women's Champions League Best Player: 2022
- CAF Women's Champions League Team of the Tournament: 2021, 2022, 2023
- 2026 CAF Women's Champions League: Group Stage Best XI
- Women's Africa Cup of Nations Team of the Tournament: 2022
- IFFHS CAF Women's Team of The Year: 2022, 2023
- CAF Women's Inter-Club Player of the Year: 2023
- CAF Women's Africa XI: 2023

== See also ==
- List of Morocco women's international footballers
