= 2024 CAF Women's Champions League =

4th CAF Women's Champions League edition

Tournament details
- Host country: Morocco
- Dates: Qualification: 1–30 August 2024; Main tournament: 9–23 November 2024
- Teams: Main tournament: 8 Total: 36 (from 36 associations)
- Venues: 2 (in 2 host cities)

Final positions
- Champions: (Democratic Republic of the Congo) TP Mazembe (1st title)
- Runners-up: (Morocco) AS FAR
- Third place: (Egypt) FC Masar
- Fourth place: (Nigeria) Edo Queens

Tournament statistics
- Matches played: 16
- Goals scored: 39 (2.44 per match)
- Top scorer(s): (Morocco) Doha El Madani (6 goals)
- Best player: (Morocco) Sanaâ Mssoudy
- Best goalkeeper: (Egypt) Habiba El Taher
- Fair play award: (Egypt) FC Masar

The 2024 CAF Women's Champions League was the fourth edition of the annual African premier women's association football club tournament organized by the Confederation of African Football. The tournament was hosted by Morocco from 9 to 23 November 2024.

TP Mazembe defeated AS FAR 1–0 in the final, claiming their first-ever CAF Women's Champions League title, and earning a spot in the group stage of the tournament's next edition.

Mamelodi Sundowns were the defending champions, but were eliminated in the group stage.

== Qualified teams ==
Location of teams of the 2024 CAF Women's Champions League group stage.
Group A
Group B

Qualification for this edition, like in previous editions of the tournament, consisted of six sub-confederation qualifying tournaments held between 1 and 30 August 2024, with each confederation having a representative. As the defending champions, Mamelodi Sundowns qualified automatically for the group stage.

| Association | Team | Qualifying method | Appearance |
|---|---|---|---|
| Morocco | AS FAR (hosts) | 2023–24 Moroccan Women's Championship champions 2024 CAF Women's Champions League UNAF Qualifiers champions | 4th |
| South Africa | Mamelodi Sundowns (holders) | 2023 CAF Women's Champions League winners | 4th |
| South Africa | UWC Ladies | 2024 CAF Women's Champions League COSAFA Qualifiers champions | 1st |
| Egypt | FC Masar (Note: The club was known as Tutankhamun during the qualifying tournament, but they underwent a rebranding and changed their name to FC Masar on 25 September 2024.) | 2024 CAF Women's Champions League UNAF Qualifiers runners-up (Note: FC Masar were granted a place in the finals on 15 October 2024, as the qualifiers winners AS FAR also won the Moroccan Women's Championship and automatically qualified as hosts.) | 1st |
| Senegal | Aigles de la Médina | 2024 CAF Women's Champions League WAFU Zone A Qualifiers champions | 1st |
| Nigeria | Edo Queens | 2024 CAF Women's Champions League WAFU Zone B Qualifiers champions | 1st |
| Ethiopia | CBE | 2024 CAF Women's Champions League CECAFA Qualifiers champions | 1st |
| DR Congo | TP Mazembe | 2024 CAF Women's Champions League UNIFFAC Qualifiers champions | 2nd |

== Venues ==
Morocco was announced as the host country for the 2024 CAF Women's Champions League on 15 October 2024. Two venues will be hosting the tournament.

| Location of the Moroccan host cities of the 2024 CAF Women's Champions League 1 Casablanca 2 El Jadida | Casablanca | El Jadida |
|---|---|---|
| Location of the Moroccan host cities of the 2024 CAF Women's Champions League 1 Casablanca 2 El Jadida | Larbi Zaouli Stadium | Ben M'Hamed El Abdi Stadium |
| Location of the Moroccan host cities of the 2024 CAF Women's Champions League 1 Casablanca 2 El Jadida | Capacity: 18,000 | Capacity: 20,000 |

== Draw ==
The draw for the group stage and final rounds was held on 18 October 2024, 11:00 GMT (12:00 local time, UTC+1), in Salé, Morocco. The eight qualified teams were drawn into two groups of four teams, with hosts AS FAR allocated to position A1, and defending champions Mamelodi Sundowns allocated to position B1.

== Group stage ==
=== Tiebreakers ===
Teams were ranked according to points (3 points for a win, 1 point for a draw, 0 points for a loss).

If two teams were tied on points, the following tiebreaking criteria were applied, in the order given, to determine the rankings (Regulations Article 71):

1. Points in head-to-head matches match between the two tied teams;
2. Goal difference in all group matches;
3. Goals scored in all group matches;
4. Drawing of lots.

If more than two teams were tied, the following criteria were applied instead:

1. Points in matches between the tied teams;
2. Goal difference in matches between the tied teams;
3. Goals scored in matches between the tied teams;
4. If after applying all criteria above, two teams were still tied, the above criteria were again applied to matches played between the two teams in question. If this did not resolve the tie, the next three criteria were applied;
5. Goal difference in all group matches;
6. Goals scored in all group matches;
7. Drawing of lots.

=== Group A ===
| Pos | Team | Pld | W | D | L | GF | GA | GD | Pts | Qualification |
|---|---|---|---|---|---|---|---|---|---|---|
| 1 | (Morocco) AS FAR (H) | 3 | 3 | 0 | 0 | 8 | 1 | +7 | 9 | Advance to knockout stage |
| 2 | (Democratic Republic of the Congo) TP Mazembe | 3 | 2 | 0 | 1 | 7 | 3 | +4 | 6 | Advance to knockout stage |
| 3 | (South Africa) UWC Ladies | 3 | 1 | 0 | 2 | 2 | 4 | −2 | 3 | |
| 4 | (Senegal) Aigles de la Médina | 3 | 0 | 0 | 3 | 0 | 9 | −9 | 0 | |

Source: Soccerway
(H) Hosts
9 November 2024
15:00

| TP Mazembe (Democratic Republic of the Congo) | 2–0 | (South Africa) UWC Ladies |
|---|---|---|
| Marta Lacho 61'; Kanjinga 77' | Report |

Ben M'Hamed El Abdi Stadium, El Jadida
Referee: Shahenda El Maghrabi (Egypt)
9 November 2024
18:00

| AS FAR (Morocco) | 3–0 | (Senegal) Aigles de la Médina |
|---|---|---|
| El Madani 9', 29'; Rabbah 45+4' | Report |

Ben M'Hamed El Abdi Stadium, El Jadida
Referee: Antsino Twanyanyukwa (Namibia)

12 November 2024
15:00

| UWC Ladies (South Africa) | 2–0 | (Senegal) Aigles de la Médina |
|---|---|---|
| Kobo 50'; Ndlovu 66' | Report |

Ben M'Hamed El Abdi Stadium, El Jadida
Referee: Aline Marie Etong (Cameroon)
12 November 2024
18:00

| AS FAR (Morocco) | 3–1 | (Democratic Republic of the Congo) TP Mazembe |
|---|---|---|
| El Madani 50'; Mssoudy 52', 58' | Report | Obono 11' |

Ben M'Hamed El Abdi Stadium, El Jadida
Referee: Natacha Konan (Ivory Coast)

15 November 2024
18:00

| UWC Ladies (South Africa) | 0–2 | (Morocco) AS FAR |
|---|---|---|
| | Report | El Madani 35' (pen.), 62' |

Ben M'Hamed El Abdi Stadium, El Jadida
Referee: Suavis Iratunga (Burundi)
15 November 2024
18:00

| Aigles de la Médina (Senegal) | 0–4 | (Democratic Republic of the Congo) TP Mazembe |
|---|---|---|
| | Report | Marta Lacho 49'; Kreto 51', 64'; Kanjinga 71' |

Larbi Zaouli Stadium, Casablanca
Referee: Antsino Twanyanyukwa (Namibia)

=== Group B ===
| Pos | Team | Pld | W | D | L | GF | GA | GD | Pts | Qualification |
|---|---|---|---|---|---|---|---|---|---|---|
| 1 | (Nigeria) Edo Queens | 3 | 2 | 1 | 0 | 5 | 1 | +4 | 7 (Note: Tied on head-to-head points. Overall goal difference: Edo Queens +4, FC Masar +2.) | Advance to knockout stage |
| 2 | (Egypt) FC Masar | 3 | 2 | 1 | 0 | 3 | 1 | +2 | 7 | Advance to knockout stage |
| 3 | (South Africa) Mamelodi Sundowns | 3 | 1 | 0 | 2 | 5 | 3 | +2 | 3 | |
| 4 | (Ethiopia) CBE | 3 | 0 | 0 | 3 | 1 | 9 | −8 | 0 | |

Source: Soccerway
Notes:
10 November 2024
15:00

| Mamelodi Sundowns (South Africa) | 0–1 | (Egypt) FC Masar |
|---|---|---|
| | Report | Niyonkuru 45+4' (pen.) |

Larbi Zaouli Stadium, Casablanca
Referee: Suavis Iratunga (Burundi)
10 November 2024
18:00

| CBE (Ethiopia) | 0–3 | (Nigeria) Edo Queens |
|---|---|---|
| | Report | Essien 5'; Ijamilusi 54'; Osigwe 80' |

Larbi Zaouli Stadium, Casablanca
Referee: Sabah Sadir (Morocco)

13 November 2024
15:00

| Mamelodi Sundowns (South Africa) | 4–0 | (Ethiopia) CBE |
|---|---|---|
| Kgadiete 17', 30'; Rabale 25'; Daweti 37' | Report |

Larbi Zaouli Stadium, Casablanca
Referee: Yacine Samassa (Mauritania)
13 November 2024
18:00

| Edo Queens (Nigeria) | 0–0 | (Egypt) FC Masar |
|---|---|---|
| | Report |

Larbi Zaouli Stadium, Casablanca
Referee: Aline Umutoni (Rwanda)

16 November 2024
18:00

| Edo Queens (Nigeria) | 2–1 | (South Africa) Mamelodi Sundowns |
|---|---|---|
| Essien 90+5'; Mamudu 90+11' | Report | Kgadiete 24' |

Larbi Zaouli Stadium, Casablanca
16 November 2024
18:00

| FC Masar (Egypt) | 2–1 | (Ethiopia) CBE |
|---|---|---|
| Niyonkuru 21'; Yasmin Mohamed 85' | Report | Wakuma 90+4' |

Ben M'Hamed El Abdi Stadium, El Jadida

== Knockout phase ==
Semi-finals
19 November – El Jadida
(Morocco) AS FAR | 2
(Egypt) FC Masar | 1
19 November – Casablanca
(Nigeria) Edo Queens | 1
(Democratic Republic of the Congo) TP Mazembe (a.e.t.) | 3

Final
23 November – El Jadida
(Morocco) AS FAR | 0
(Democratic Republic of the Congo) TP Mazembe | 1
Third place
22 November – El Jadida
(Egypt) FC Masar (p) | 0 (4)
(Nigeria) Edo Queens | 0 (3)

=== Semi-finals ===
19 November 2024
15:00

| Edo Queens (Nigeria) | 1–3 (a.e.t.) | (Democratic Republic of the Congo) TP Mazembe |
|---|---|---|
| Essien 65' | Report | Kanjinga 90'; Folorunsho 101' (o.g.); Kasaj 105+3' (pen.) |

Larbi Zaouli Stadium, Casablanca
Referee: Suavis Iratunga (Burundi)

19 November 2024
18:00

| AS FAR (Morocco) | 2–1 | (Egypt) FC Masar |
|---|---|---|
| Banouk 12'; El Madani 90+6' | Report | Ehab 90+5' (pen.) |

Ben M'Hamed El Abdi Stadium, El Jadida
Referee: Antsino Twanyanyukwa (Namibia)

=== Third-place match ===
22 November 2024
18:00

| FC Masar (Egypt) | 0–0 | (Nigeria) Edo Queens |
|---|---|---|
| | Report |
Penalties
| Niyonkuru (penalty scored); Abdelwahed (penalty scored); Moustafa (penalty scored); Abouelwafa (penalty missed); Ali (penalty scored) | 4–3 | (penalty missed) Mafisere; (penalty scored) Ilivieda; (penalty scored) Essien; (penalty scored) Ijamilusi; (penalty missed) Olise |

Ben M'Hamed El Abdi Stadium, El Jadida
Referee: Aline Umutoni (Rwanda)

=== Final ===
23 November 2024
18:00

| AS FAR (Morocco) | 0–1 | (Democratic Republic of the Congo) TP Mazembe |
|---|---|---|
| | Report | Kasaj 10' (pen.) |

Ben M'Hamed El Abdi Stadium, El Jadida
Attendance: 15,000
Referee: Vincentia Amedome (Togo)

== Statistics ==
=== Top scorers ===
| Rank | Player | Team | Goals |
|---|---|---|---|
| 1 | (Morocco) Doha El Madani | (Morocco) AS FAR | 6 |
| 2 | (South Africa) Melinda Kgadiete | (South Africa) Mamelodi Sundowns | 3 |
| 2 | (Democratic Republic of the Congo) Merveille Kanjinga | (Democratic Republic of the Congo) TP Mazembe | 3 |
| 2 | (Nigeria) Emem Essien | (Nigeria) Edo Queens | 3 |
| 5 | (Morocco) Sanaâ Mssoudy | (Morocco) AS FAR | 2 |
| 5 | (Angola) Marta Lacho | (Democratic Republic of the Congo) TP Mazembe | 2 |
| 5 | (Democratic Republic of the Congo) Marlène Kasaj | (Democratic Republic of the Congo) TP Mazembe | 2 |
| 5 | (Ivory Coast) Priscille Kreto | (Democratic Republic of the Congo) TP Mazembe | 2 |
| 5 | (Burundi) Sandrine Niyonkuru | (Egypt) FC Masar | 2 |
| 10 | multiple | | 1 |

== Awards ==
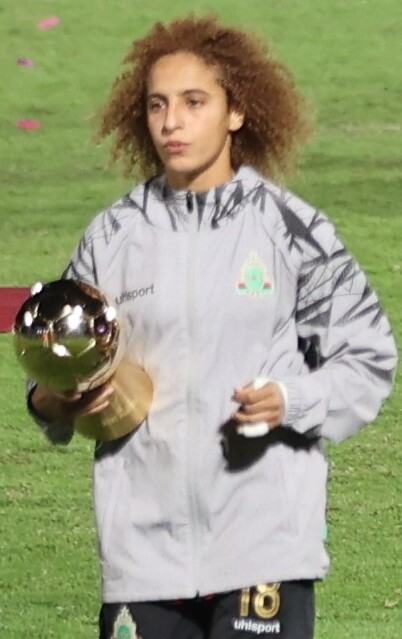
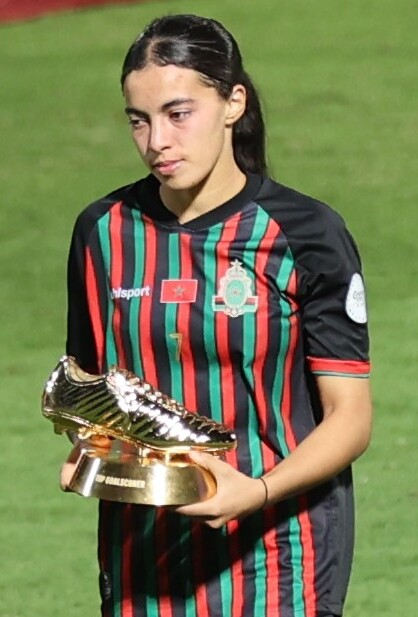
Sanaâ Mssoudy (left) and Doha El Madani (right) with their trophies.

The CAF Women's Champions League technical study group selected the following as the best of the tournament.

| Award | Player | Team |
|---|---|---|
| Best Player | (Morocco) Sanaâ Mssoudy | (Morocco) AS FAR |
| Top Goal scorer | (Morocco) Doha El Madani | (Morocco) AS FAR |
| Best Goalkeeper | (Egypt) Habiba Emad | (Egypt) FC Masar |
| Fairplay team | (Egypt) FC Masar | |

The CAF Technical Study Group has announced the tournament's Best XI as follows:

| Goalkeepers | Defenders | Midfielders | Forwards |
Best XI
| (Egypt) Emad | (Nigeria) Usani (Uganda) Nankya (Uganda) Nantongo (Democratic Republic of the Congo) Vukulu | (Democratic Republic of the Congo) Kasaj (Morocco) Mssoudy (Burundi) Niyonkuru | (Morocco) El Madani (Democratic Republic of the Congo) Kanjinga (Angola) Marta Lacho |

Coach: Lamia Boumehdi

== See also ==
- 2023–24 and 2024–25 CAF Champions League
