= CAF Women's Champions League =

African women's club football competition

- Organiser(s): CAF
- Founded: 12 September 2020; 6 years ago
- Region: Africa
- Teams: Final tournament: 8; Total: 33
- Qualifier for: FIFA Women's Club World Cup; FIFA Women's Champions Cup
- Current champions: (Morocco) AS FAR; (3rd title)
- Most championships: (Morocco) AS FAR; (3 titles)
- Broadcasters: SuperSport (Sub-Saharan Africa); BeIN Sports (MENA, Canada, USA, Turkey, Asia-Pacific, Australia & New Zealand); CAF TV and FIFA TV on YouTube (live-match streaming)
- Website: Official website
- 2026 CAF WCL

The CAF Women's Champions League (French: Ligue des Champions Féminine de la CAF; Arabic: دوري أبطال إفريقيا للسيدات), sometimes abbreviated as CAF WCL, is an annual African women's association football club competition launched on 12 September 2020 and organized by the Confederation of African Football (CAF). It is the female counterpart of the CAF Champions League.

The winner of each season of the competition earns a berth for the FIFA Women's Champions Cup, while the champions across a four-year cycle, depending on the allocated spots for each confederation, earn a place in the new FIFA Women's Club World Cup.

The competition has been won by several clubs, two of which have secured the trophy more than once. AS FAR is the most successful club in the competition’s history, having won the tournament three times. AS FAR are the current African champions, having defeated Mamelodi Sundowns 3–1 in the 2026 final.

== History ==
List of winners
Season	Winners
CAF Women's Champions League
2021	(South Africa) Mamelodi Sundowns
2022	(Morocco) AS FAR
2023	(South Africa) Mamelodi Sundowns (2)
2024	(Democratic Republic of the Congo) TP Mazembe
2025	(Morocco) AS FAR (2)
2026	(Morocco) AS FAR (3)

CAF cancelled the 2020 Women's Africa Cup of Nations at a virtual executive meeting on 30 June citing the impact of the COVID-19 pandemic on association football in Africa as the reason and rather approved the creation of the CAF Women's Champions League which launched on 12 September that year. South Africa's Mamelodi Sundowns won the inaugural title 2–0 against Hasaacas Ladies of Ghana in Cairo. Sanaâ Mssoudy became the first player ever to score a hat-trick in the tournament, netting three goals for AS FAR against Rivers Angels during the group stage.

On 18 April 2022, CAF issued a press release to its member associations wishing to engage their domestic league champions in the qualification procedures for the 2022 edition to submit viable club licensing documents to them by 31 May. That edition was won by AS FAR of Morocco after beating then-defending champions Mamelodi Sundowns 4–0 in the final, which remains the biggest winning margin in a CAF Women’s Champions League final. Ibtissam Jraïdi became the first (and only) player to score a hat-trick in a CAF WCL final, netting three goals in the final, and she ended the tournament as the top goalscorer with six goals.

On 19 May 2023, CAF chose Ivory Coast to host the third edition as part of its AFCON 2023 preparations, where Mamelodi Sundowns reclaimed the title with a 3–0 win over SC Casablanca. Morocco then hosted the fourth edition, with TP Mazembe defeating AS FAR 1–0. In the fifth edition, AS FAR captured the title and became the first team to represent CAF in the inaugural FIFA Women's Champions Cup.

In the 2026 edition, AS FAR became the first club to win back-to-back titles after defeating Mamelodi Sundowns 3–1 in the final.

== Sponsorship ==
This tournament uses the same sponsors as other major CAF competitions, including the CAF Champions League.

== Format ==
The format for the first edition saw the champions of each of the six CAF zones play for a spot in the competition. They are joined by the hosts and an extra team from the zone of the defending/reigning/current Women's Africa Cup of Nations champions (for the inaugural edition only). The tournament is currently played in two groups of four teams. Since the 2022 edition, the spot reserved for the additional team from the CAF sub-region of the incumbent Women's AFCON is given instead to this tournament's defending champions.

== Results ==
CAF Women's Champions League finals
Season	Winners	Score	Runners-up	Venue	Attendance
2021	(South Africa) Mamelodi Sundowns	2–0	(Ghana) Hasaacas Ladies	30 June Stadium, Cairo	0 (Note: The final was played behind closed doors due to the COVID-19 pandemic in Africa.)
2022	(Morocco) AS FAR	4–0	(South Africa) Mamelodi Sundowns	Prince Moulay Abdellah Stadium, Rabat	15,000
2023	(South Africa) Mamelodi Sundowns	3–0	(Morocco) SC Casablanca	Amadou Gon Coulibaly Stadium, Korhogo	20,000
2024	(Democratic Republic of the Congo) TP Mazembe	1–0	(Morocco) AS FAR	Ben M'Hamed El Abdi Stadium, El Jadida	15,000
2025	(Morocco) AS FAR	2–1	(Ivory Coast) ASEC Mimosas	Suez Canal Stadium, Ismailia	150
2026	(Morocco) AS FAR	3–1	(South Africa) Mamelodi Sundowns	Suez Canal Stadium, Ismailia	500

== Records and statistics ==
=== Performance by club ===
Final Appearances by Club
Club	Titles	Runners-up	Seasons won	Seasons runner-up
(Morocco) AS FAR	3	1	2022, 2025, 2026	2024
(South Africa) Mamelodi Sundowns	2	2	2021, 2023	2022, 2026
(Democratic Republic of the Congo) TP Mazembe	1	0	2024	—
(Ghana) Hasaacas Ladies	0	1	—	2021
(Morocco) SC Casablanca	0	1	—	2023
(Ivory Coast) ASEC Mimosas	0	1	—	2025

=== Performance by nation ===
Performances in finals by nation
Nation	Winners	Runners-up	Total
Morocco	3	2	5
South Africa	2	2	4
DR Congo	1	0	1
Ghana	0	1	1
Ivory Coast	0	1	1

=== Performances by region ===
Federation (Region)	Clubs Winners	Clubs Runners-up	Titles
UNAF (North Africa)	AS FAR (3)	SC Casablanca (1), AS FAR (1)	3
COSAFA (Southern Africa)	Mamelodi Sundowns (2)	Mamelodi Sundowns (2)	2
UNIFFAC (Central Africa)	TP Mazembe (1)		1
WAFU (West Africa)		Hasaacas Ladies (1), ASEC Mimosas (1)	0
CECAFA (East Africa)			0

== Awards ==
Tournament	Most Valuable Player	Golden Boot	Goals	Golden Glove	Ref
2021	(Ghana) Evelyn Badu	(Ghana) Evelyn Badu	5	(South Africa) Andile Dlamini	
2022	(Morocco) Fatima Tagnaout	(Morocco) Ibtissam Jraïdi	6	(Morocco) Khadija Er-Rmichi	
2023	(Lesotho) Boitumelo Rabale	(Botswana) Refilwe Tholakele	5	(South Africa) Andile Dlamini	
2024	(Morocco) Sanaâ Mssoudy	(Morocco) Doha El Madani	6	(Egypt) Habiba Emad	
2025	(Ivory Coast) Habibou Ouédraogo	(Democratic Republic of the Congo) Marlène Kasaj	5	(Morocco) Khadija Er-Rmichi	
2026	(Morocco) Ghizlane Chebbak	(Morocco) Imane Touriss	4	(Morocco) Khadija Er-Rmichi	

== Prizes ==
The price money:

Final position	Prize money (2021–2023)	Price money (2024–Present)
Champions	US$400,000	US$600,000
Runners-up	US$250,000	US$400,000
3rd place	US$200,000	US$350,000
4th place	US$200,000	US$300,000
3rd in group stage	US$150,000	US$200,000
4th in group stage	US$100,000	US$150,000

== Broadcast rights ==
Current broadcast right holders as of May 2023.

Country/Region	Channels
Morocco	SNRT
Ivory Coast	RTI
South Africa	SABC
Tanzania	Azam
Egypt	On-Time Sport
Togo	New World TV
Ghana	TBC
Uganda	TBC
Europe	Canal+
(Arab League) MENA	beIN Sports
Worldwide	YouTube

== See also ==
- FIFA Women's Champions Cup
- FIFA Women's Club World Cup
- CAF Champions League
