= 2022 CAF Women's Champions League =

2nd CAF Women's Champions League

Tournament details
- Host country: Morocco
- Dates: Qualification: 7 August – 16 September; Main tournament: 30 October – 13 November
- Teams: Main tournament: 8 Total: 33 (from 33 associations)
- Venue: 3 (in 2 host cities)

Final positions
- Champions: (Morocco) AS FAR (1st title)
- Runners-up: (South Africa) Mamelodi Sundowns
- Third place: (Nigeria) Bayelsa Queens
- Fourth place: (Tanzania) Simba Queens

Tournament statistics
- Matches played: 16
- Goals scored: 39 (2.44 per match)
- Top scorer: (Morocco) Ibtissam Jraïdi (6 goals)
- Best player: (Morocco) Fatima Tagnaout
- Best goalkeeper: (Morocco) Khadija Er-Rmichi

The 2022 CAF Women's Champions League was the 2nd edition of the annual African women's association football club tournament organized by the Confederation of African Football (CAF) held in Morocco from 30 October to 13 November 2022.

Mamelodi Sundowns were the defending champions after claiming the inaugural edition title, but was dethroned after losing 0–4 to AS FAR in the final. With the first title, AS FAR automatically qualified for the group stage of the 2023 edition.

== Qualified teams ==
Location of teams of the 2022 CAF Women's Champions League group stage.
Group A
Group B

Qualification was made up of 6 sub-confederation qualifying tournaments which ran from 7 August to 16 September 2022 with each confederation having a representative. As defending champions, Mamelodi Sundowns qualified automatically for the group stage of this edition of the tournament, despite losing on penalty kicks in the final of their qualification tournament.

| Association | Team | Qualifying method | Appearance |
|---|---|---|---|
| Morocco | AS FAR (hosts) | 2021–22 Moroccan Championship champions | 2nd |
| South Africa | Mamelodi Sundowns | Title holders (2021 CAF Women's Champions League winners) | 2nd |
| Zambia | Green Buffaloes | 2022 CAF WCL COSAFA Qualifiers Champions | 1st |
| Egypt | Wadi Degla | 2022 CAF WCL UNAF Qualifiers champions | 2nd |
| Liberia | Determine Girls | 2022 CAF WCL WAFU Zone A Qualifiers champions | 1st |
| Tanzania | Simba Queens | 2022 CAF WCL CECAFA Qualifiers champions | 1st |
| Nigeria | Bayelsa Queens | 2022 CAF WCL WAFU Zone B Qualifiers champions | 1st |
| DR Congo | TP Mazembe | 2022 CAF WCL UNIFFAC Qualifiers champions | 1st |

== Draw ==
The draw of this edition of the tournament was held at the Mohammed VI Technical Centre in Rabat, Morocco on 9 September 2022 at 11:30 CET (10:30 UTC). The 7 confirmed teams and the unknown UNIFFAC champion at the time of the draw were drawn into two groups of four teams. As club competition hosts, AS FAR was allocated to position A1.

== Venues ==
On 16 October 2022, CAF indicated that this edition of the tournament will be held in Rabat and Marrakesh.

| | Rabat | | Marrakesh |
|---|---|---|---|
| 2022 CAF Women's Champions League is located in Morocco | Prince Moulay Abdellah Stadium | Stade Moulay Hassan | Stade de Marrakech |
| 2022 CAF Women's Champions League is located in Morocco | Capacity: 45,800 | Capacity: 12,000 | Capacity: 45,240 |

== Match officials ==
Referees

- (Burundi) Suavis Iratunga
- (Ivory Coast) Zomadre Kore
- (Egypt) Shahenda El Maghrabi
- (Morocco) Fatima El Ajjani
- (Namibia) Antsino Twanyanyukwa
- (Nigeria) Patience Madu Ndidi
- (Senegal) Mame Faye
- (South Africa) Akhona Makalima
- (Togo) Vincentia Amedome
- (Uganda) Shamirah Nabadda

Assistant referees

- (Algeria) Asma Ouahab
- (Benin) Nafissatou Yekini
- (Cameroon) Carine Atezambong
- (Democratic Republic of the Congo) Mireille Mujanayi
- (Madagascar) Pélagie Rakotozafinoro
- (Malawi) Bernadettar Kwimbira
- (Mali) Fanta Kone
- (Mauritania) Mariem Chedad
- (Morocco) Ihsane Nouali
- (Morocco) Karima Khadiri
- (Tunisia) Houda Afine
- (Zambia) Diana Chikotesha

Video assistant referees

- (Egypt) Ahmed El Ghandour
- (Ghana) Daniel Nii Ayi Laryea
- (Mauritania) Dahane Beida
- (Mauritius) Imtehaz Heeralall
- (Morocco) Samir Guezzaz
- (Morocco) Zakaria Brindisi
- (Tunisia) Haythem Guirat

== Group stage ==
The group stage kick-off times are in West Africa Time (WAT) (UTC+01:00).

=== Tiebreakers ===
Teams were ranked according to points (3 points for a win, 1 point for a draw, 0 points for a loss).

If two teams were tied on points, the following tiebreaking criteria were applied, in the order given, to determine the rankings (Regulations Article 71):

1. Points in head-to-head matches match between the two tied teams;
2. Goal difference in all group matches;
3. Goals scored in all group matches;
4. Drawing of lots.

If more than two teams were tied, the following criteria were applied instead:

1. Points in matches between the tied teams;
2. Goal difference in matches between the tied teams;
3. Goals scored in matches between the tied teams;
4. If after applying all criteria above, two teams were still tied, the above criteria were again applied to matches played between the two teams in question. If this did not resolve the tie, the next three criteria were applied;
5. Goal difference in all group matches;
6. Goals scored in all group matches;
7. Drawing of lots.

=== Group A ===
| Pos | Team | Pld | W | D | L | GF | GA | GD | Pts | Qualification |
|---|---|---|---|---|---|---|---|---|---|---|
| 1 | (Morocco) AS FAR (H) | 3 | 3 | 0 | 0 | 5 | 1 | +4 | 9 | Advance to Semi-finals |
| 2 | (Tanzania) Simba Queens | 3 | 2 | 0 | 1 | 4 | 1 | +3 | 6 | Advance to Semi-finals |
| 3 | (Zambia) Green Buffaloes | 3 | 1 | 0 | 2 | 5 | 4 | +1 | 3 | |
| 4 | (Liberia) Determine Girls | 3 | 0 | 0 | 3 | 0 | 8 | −8 | 0 | |

Source: CAFOnline.com
(H) Hosts
30 October 2022
17:00

| Green Buffaloes (Zambia) | 4–0 | (Liberia) Determine Girls |
|---|---|---|
| M. Chilenga 8'; N. Nanyangwe 30'; Chanda 31'; Lungu 58' | Report (archived) |

Stade Moulay Hassan, Rabat
Referee: Shahenda El Maghrabi (Egypt)
30 October 2022
20:00

| AS FAR (Morocco) | 1–0 | (Tanzania) Simba Queens |
|---|---|---|
| Jraidi 67' | Report |

Stade Moulay Hassan, Rabat
Referee: Akhona Makalima (South Africa)

2 November 2022
17:00

| Determine Girls (Liberia) | 0–2 | (Tanzania) Simba Queens |
|---|---|---|
| | Report (archived) | Clement 53'; B. Olaiya 80' (pen.) |

Stade Moulay Hassan, Rabat
Referee: Sonia Koré (Ivory Coast)
2 November 2022
20:00

| AS FAR (Morocco) | 2–1 | (Zambia) Green Buffaloes |
|---|---|---|
| Tagnaout 30' (pen.), 62' (pen.) | Report (archived) | Lungu 19' |

Stade Moulay Hassan, Rabat
Referee: Vincentina Amedomé (Togo)

5 November 2022
20:00

| Determine Girls (Liberia) | 0–2 | (Morocco) AS FAR |
|---|---|---|
| | | O. Harcouch 47'; Jraïdi 78' |

Stade Moulay Hassan, Rabat
Referee: Patience Madu (Nigeria)
5 November 2022
20:00

| Simba Queens (Tanzania) | 2–0 | (Zambia) Green Buffaloes |
|---|---|---|
| Djafari 64'; Clement 79' |

Stade de Marrakech, Marrakesh
Referee: Akhona Makalima (South Africa)

=== Group B ===
| Pos | Team | Pld | W | D | L | GF | GA | GD | Pts | Qualification |
|---|---|---|---|---|---|---|---|---|---|---|
| 1 | (South Africa) Mamelodi Sundowns | 3 | 3 | 0 | 0 | 11 | 1 | +10 | 9 | Advance to Semi-finals |
| 2 | (Nigeria) Bayelsa Queens | 3 | 2 | 0 | 1 | 6 | 2 | +4 | 6 | Advance to Semi-finals |
| 3 | (Democratic Republic of the Congo) TP Mazembe | 3 | 1 | 0 | 2 | 1 | 6 | −5 | 3 | |
| 4 | (Egypt) Wadi Degla | 3 | 0 | 0 | 3 | 0 | 9 | −9 | 0 | |

Source: CAFOnline.com
31 October 2022
17:00

| Mamelodi Sundowns (South Africa) | 2–1 | (Nigeria) Bayelsa Queens |
|---|---|---|
| Lelona Daweti 32', 58' | Report (archived) | M.-M. Anjor 81' |

Stade de Marrakech, Marrakesh
Referee: Shamirah Nabadda (Uganda)
31 October 2022
20:00

| Wadi Degla (Egypt) | 0–1 | (Democratic Republic of the Congo) TP Mazembe |
|---|---|---|
| | Report (archived) | Kanjinga 7' |

Stade de Marrakech, Marrakesh
Referee: Antsino Twanyanyukwa (Namibia)

3 November 2022
17:00

| Mamelodi Sundowns (South Africa) | 5–0 | (Egypt) Wadi Degla |
|---|---|---|
| Lelona Daweti 10'; Kgadiete 25'; Mbane 60', 76'; Rabale 65' | Report |

Stade de Marrakech, Marrakesh
Referee: Suavis Iratunga (Burundi)
3 November 2022
20:00

| TP Mazembe (Democratic Republic of the Congo) | 0–2 | (Nigeria) Bayelsa Queens |
|---|---|---|
| | Report | O. Joseph 4' (pen.); G. Chinyere 24' |

Stade de Marrakech, Marrakesh
Referee: Fatima El Ajjani (Morocco)

6 November 2022
20:00

| TP Mazembe (Democratic Republic of the Congo) | 0–4 | (South Africa) Mamelodi Sundowns |
|---|---|---|
| | Report | Zanele Nhlapho 19' (pen.); Lelona Daweti 40'; Kgadiete 49'; G. Kekana 90' |

Stade de Marrakech, Marrakesh
Referee: Antsino Twanyanyukwa (Namibia)
6 November 2022
20:00

| Bayelsa Queens (Nigeria) | 3–0 | (Egypt) Wadi Degla |
|---|---|---|
| J. Sunday 8'; M. Itimi 49', 54' | Report |

Stade Moulay Hassan, Rabat
Referee: Vincentina Amedomé (Togo)

== Knockout phase ==
Semi-finals
9 November – Rabat
(Morocco) AS FAR | 1
(Nigeria) Bayelsa Queens | 0
9 November – Rabat
(South Africa) Mamelodi Sundowns | 1
(Tanzania) Simba Queens | 0

Final
13 November – Rabat
(Morocco) AS FAR | 4
(South Africa) Mamelodi Sundowns | 0
Third place
12 November – Rabat
(Nigeria) Bayelsa Queens | 1
(Tanzania) Simba Queens | 0

=== Semi-finals ===
9 November 2022
17:00

| Mamelodi Sundowns (South Africa) | 1–0 | (Tanzania) Simba Queens |
|---|---|---|
| Rabale 76' | Report |

Stade Moulay Hassan, Rabat
Referee: Shahenda El Maghrabi (Egypt)

9 November 2022
21:00

| AS FAR (Morocco) | 1–0 | (Nigeria) Bayelsa Queens |
|---|---|---|
| Jraïdi 27' | Report |

Stade Moulay Hassan, Rabat
Referee: Shamirah Nabadda (Uganda)

=== Third-place match ===
12 November 2022
20:00

| Bayelsa Queens (Nigeria) | 1–0 | (Tanzania) Simba Queens |
|---|---|---|
| J. Sunday 70' | Report |

Stade Moulay Hassan, Rabat
Referee: Antsino Twanyanyukwa (Namibia)

=== Final ===
13 November 2022
20:00

| AS FAR (Morocco) | 4–0 | (South Africa) Mamelodi Sundowns |
|---|---|---|
| Tagnaout 15' (pen.); Jraïdi 54', 87', 90+2' | Report |

Prince Moulay Abdellah Stadium, Rabat
Attendance: 15,000
Referee: Vincentina Amedomé (Togo)

== Statistics ==
=== Top scorers ===
This is the list of the top ten scorers in the main phase of this edition of the tournament:

| Rank | Player | Team | Goals |
|---|---|---|---|
| 1 | (Morocco) Ibtissam Jraïdi | (Morocco) AS FAR | 6 |
| 2 | (South Africa) Lelona Daweti | (South Africa) Mamelodi Sundowns | 4 |
| 3 | (Morocco) Fatima Tagnaout | (Morocco) AS FAR | 3 |
| 4 | (Nigeria) Mercy Itimi | (Nigeria) Bayelsa Queens | 2 |
| 4 | (Nigeria) Juliet Sunday | (Nigeria) Bayelsa Queens | 2 |
| 4 | (South Africa) Melinda Kgadiete | (South Africa) Mamelodi Sundowns | 2 |
| 4 | (South Africa) Bambanani Mbane | (South Africa) Mamelodi Sundowns | 2 |
| 4 | (Lesotho) Boitumelo Rabale | (South Africa) Mamelodi Sundowns | 2 |
| 4 | (Tanzania) Opah Clement | (Tanzania) Simba Queens | 2 |
| 4 | (Zambia) Ireen Lungu | (Zambia) Green Buffaloes | 2 |
| 11 | (Democratic Republic of the Congo) Merveille Kanjinga | (Democratic Republic of the Congo) TP Mazembe | 1 |
| 11 | (Morocco) Oumaima Harcouch | (Morocco) AS FAR | 1 |
| 11 | (Nigeria) Mary-Magdalene Anjor | (Nigeria) Bayelsa Queens | 1 |
| 11 | (Nigeria) Grace Chinyere | (Nigeria) Bayelsa Queens | 1 |
| 11 | (Nigeria) Ogoma Joseph | (Nigeria) Bayelsa Queens | 1 |
| 11 | (South Africa) Gabonnelwe Kekana | (South Africa) Mamelodi Sundowns | 1 |
| 11 | (South Africa) Zanele Nhlapo | (South Africa) Mamelodi Sundowns | 1 |
| 11 | (Burundi) Asha Djafari | (Tanzania) Simba Queens | 1 |
| 11 | (Nigeria) Barakat Olaiya | (Tanzania) Simba Queens | 1 |
| 11 | (Zambia) Hellen Chanda | (Zambia) Green Buffaloes | 1 |
| 11 | (Zambia) Maweta Chilenga | (Zambia) Green Buffaloes | 1 |
| 11 | (Zambia) Natasha Nanyangwe | (Zambia) Green Buffaloes | 1 |

== Final standings ==
Per statistical convention in football, matches decided in extra time are counted as wins and losses, while matches decided by a penalty shoot-out are counted as draws.

| Pos. | Team | Pld | W | D | L | Pts | GF | GA | GD |
|---|---|---|---|---|---|---|---|---|---|
| 1 | (Morocco) AS FAR | 5 | 5 | 0 | 0 | 15 | 10 | 1 | +9 |
| 2 | (South Africa) Mamelodi Sundowns | 5 | 4 | 0 | 1 | 12 | 12 | 5 | +7 |
| 3 | (Nigeria) Bayelsa Queens | 5 | 3 | 0 | 2 | 9 | 7 | 3 | +4 |
| 4 | (Tanzania) Simba Queens | 5 | 2 | 0 | 3 | 6 | 4 | 3 | +1 |
Eliminated in group stage
| 5 | (Zambia) Green Buffaloes | 3 | 1 | 0 | 2 | 3 | 5 | 4 | +1 |
| 6 | (Democratic Republic of the Congo) TP Mazembe | 3 | 1 | 0 | 2 | 3 | 1 | 6 | −5 |
| 7 | (Liberia) Determine Girls | 3 | 0 | 0 | 3 | 0 | 0 | 8 | −8 |
| 8 | (Egypt) Wadi Degla | 3 | 0 | 0 | 3 | 0 | 0 | 9 | −9 |

== Awards ==
The CAF Women's Champions League technical study group selected the following as the best of the tournament.

| Award | Player | Team |
|---|---|---|
| Best Player | (Morocco) Fatima Tagnaout | (Morocco) AS FAR |
| Top Goal scorer | (Morocco) Ibtissam Jraïdi | (Morocco) AS FAR |
| Best Goalkeeper | (Morocco) Khadija Er-Rmichi | (Morocco) AS FAR |
| Fairplay team | (Nigeria) Bayelsa Queens | |

== See also ==
- 2022 AFC Women's Club Championship (Asia)
- 2022 Copa Libertadores Femenina (South America)
- 2021–22 and 2022–23 UEFA Women's Champions League (Europe)
