= TP Mazembe (women) =

Congolese women's football team

- Full name: Tout Puissant Mazembe
- Nicknames: Les Corbeaux (The Ravens); Les Badiangwena (The Crocodile Eaters)
- Founded: 2020; 6 years ago
- Ground: Stade TP Mazembe
- Capacity: 18,500
- president: Jeff Kapondo
- coach: Lamia Boumehdi
- League: DR Congo women's football championship
- Website: http://www.tpmazembe.com

Tout Puissant Mazembe, commonly referred to as TP Mazembe is a Congolese Women's association football club competing in the Congolese Women's Championship. The club is based in the city of Lubumbashi and plays its matches at the Stade TP Mazembe in the Kamalondo neighborhood.

They won the 2024 CAF Women's Champions League to lift their first continental title.

== History ==
The women's section of TP Mazembe was established on September 28, 2020. The team quickly achieved success by winning the Lubumbashi championship and the Haut-Katanga championship in 2021, just a few months after its creation.

On March 2, 2022, the club achieved a record-breaking 43–0 victory against FC Œcuménique in the EUFLU (local championship of Lubumbashi). The Corbeaux then won the Haut-Katanga championship for the second consecutive time, securing qualification for the Coupe du Congo. On June 28, 2022, the club claimed its first national title by defeating CFS Bikira in the Coupe du Congo final.

This triumph enabled TP Mazembe to represent the Democratic Republic of Congo in the UNIFFAC zone tournament, a qualifying event for the 2022 CAF Women's Champions League. The Congolese team dominated the Cameroonian team, AS Awa, in the final (2-1) and qualified for the final phase in Morocco.

On 29 March 2023, the club appointed Lamia Boumehdi, the former coach of the Morocco women's national under-20 football team, to lead the team. In her inaugural season, Lamia guided the team to victory in the 2022-23 Congolese Women's Championship. This accomplishment marked their second consecutive qualification for the prestigious CAF Women's Champions League. They won their first continental title at the 2024 CAF Women's Champions League defeating ASFAR from Morocco 1-0 in the final. They were named the best women's team (club) at the 2024 CAF awards.

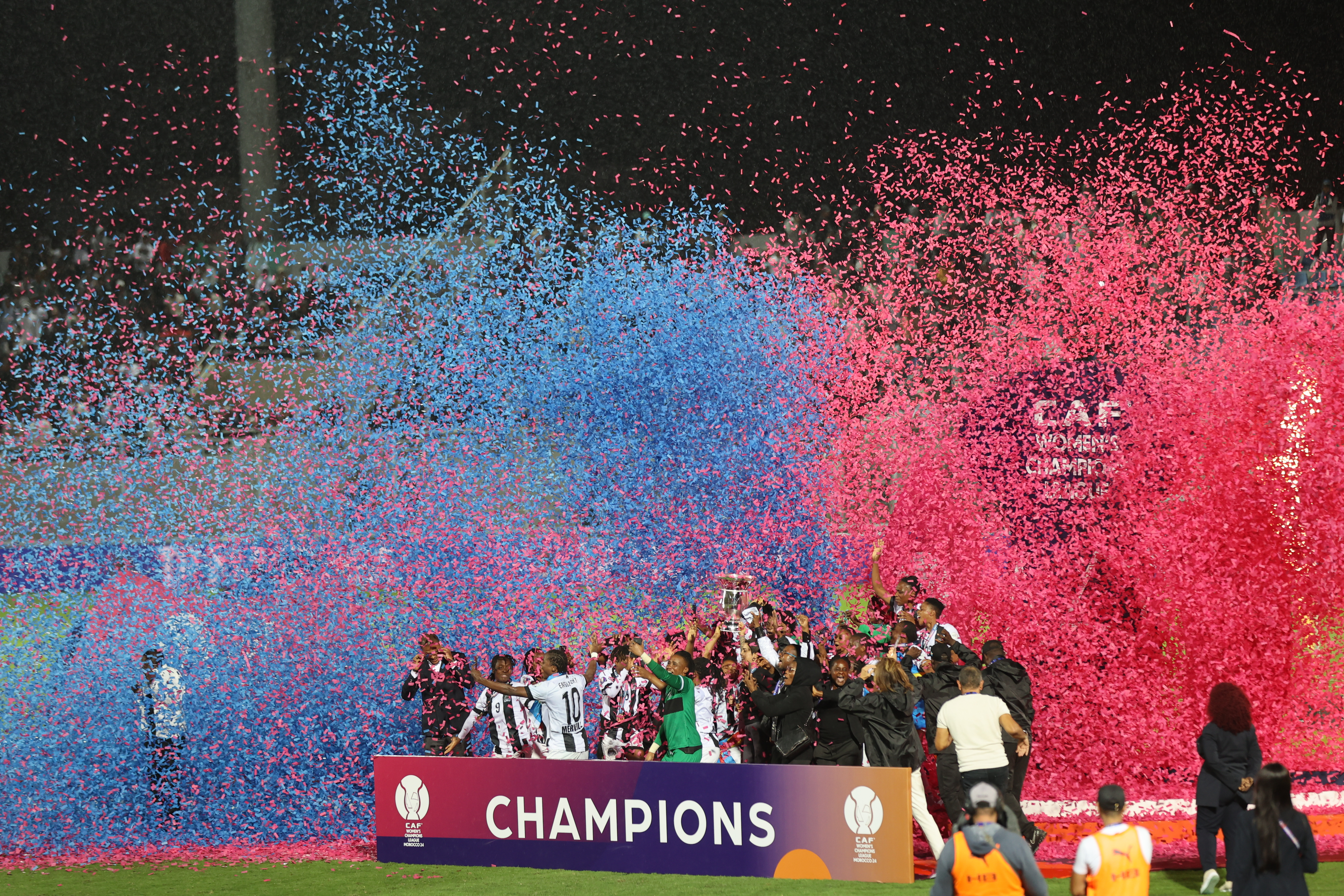
TP Mazembe celebrating their victory.

== Current squad ==
As of 9 November 2025

Note: Flags indicate national team as defined under FIFA eligibility rules; some limited exceptions apply. Players may hold more than one non-FIFA nationality.

No.	Pos.	Nation	Player
1	GK	CGO	Jessica Mpika
2	DF	COD	Bélange Vukulu (captain)
3	FW	COD	Wivine Makasi
5	DF	CMR	Nathacha Nkonda
7	FW	NGA	Oluwayemisi Samuel
8	MF	COD	Marlène Kasaj
9	MF	EQG	Elena Obono
10	MF	GHA	Grace Acheampong
11	MF	ZIM	Emmaculate Msipa
12	MF	JAM	Shanise Foster
13	FW	COD	Esther Dikisha

No.	Pos.	Nation	Player
14	FW	NGA	Rosemary Adesina
15	FW	GHA	Portia Boakye
16	MF	RSA	Kgalebane Mohlakoana
19	DF	NGA	Glory Edet
20	GK	COD	Ruth Khonde
21	GK	COD	Fideline Ngoy
22	DF	GHA	Sarah Kulible
23	FW	GHA	Gifty Assifuah
24	DF	CMR	Ladifatou Ngambe
25	MF	GHA	Thelma Baffour

== Honours ==
=== Domestic ===
- DR Congo women's Championship:

Winners (3): 2022, 2023, 2024

- DR Congo women's Cup:

Winners (1): 2022

=== Continental ===
- CAF Women's Champions League:

Winners (1): 2024
Third place (1): 2025

- UNIFFAC Women's Tournament:

Winners (2): 2022, 2024

=== Awards ===
- CAF Club of the Year (Women): 2024
