= Morocco women's national football team results =

The Morocco women's national football team is the representative women's association football team of Morocco . Its governing body is the Royal Moroccan Football Federation (RMFF) and it competes as a member of the Confederation of African Football (CAF)

Legend

Win Draw Lose Fixture

== 1998 ==
19 March Friendly	Morocco	0–3	South Africa	Rabat, Morocco

5 July Friendly	South Africa	1–1	Morocco	Pretoria, South Africa

7 July Friendly	South Africa	2–1	Morocco	Tembisa, South Africa

== 2000 ==
30 July 2000 2000 Africa Women Cup of Nations qualification Final round	Morocco	3–0	Algeria	El Jadida
		Report

12 August 2000 2000 Africa Women Cup of Nations qualification Final round	Algeria	1–3	Morocco	Algiers
		Report

== 2006 ==
21 April 2006 2006 Arab Women's Championship Group B	Algeria	0–0	Morocco	Alexandria Stadium, Alexandria
15:00

29 April 2006 2006 Arab Women's Championship Final	Algeria	1–0	Morocco	Alexandria Stadium, Alexandria
16:00	Boumrar 79'

== 2007 ==
2 December 2007 2008 African Women's Championship qualificationFirst round	Morocco	0–1	Algeria	Stade El Abdi, El Jadida
			Zerrouki	Referee: ... (Togo)

16 December 2007 2008 African Women's Championship qualificationFirst round	Algeria	2–1	Morocco	Stade Ali Benfedda, Zéralda
	Bouhenni 44'; Benguedouche 63'		Regab 42'

== 2011 ==
15 January 2011 2012 CAF Women's Pre-Olympic Tournament	Morocco	0–3	Tunisia	El Jadida

29 January 2011 2012 CAF Women's Pre-Olympic Tournament	Tunisia	0–1	Morocco	Radès
			Bouharat

== 2012 ==
14 January 2012 2012 African Women's Championship qualification	Morocco	2–0	Tunisia	Rabat
	Jraidi 25'; Chebbak 63'	Report

28 January 2012 2012 African Women's Championship qualification	Tunisia	2–0 (3–5 p)	Morocco	Soliman
	Houij 15', 37'

== 2014 ==
14 February 2014 2014 African Women's Championship qualification First round 1st leg	Algeria	2–0	Morocco	Algiers, Algeria
17:00	Bouhenni 11', 56'	Report		Stadium: Omar Hamadi Stadium; Referee: Kankou Coulibaly (Mali)

1 March 2014 2014 African Women's Championship qualification First round 2nd leg	Morocco	0–0 (0–2 agg.)	Algeria	Rabat, Morocco
18:00		Report		Stadium: Prince Moulay Abdellah Stadium; Referee: Fatou Thioune (Senegal)
Note: Algeria won 2–0 on aggregate.

== 2018 ==
18 October 2018 Friendly	Morocco	3–1	Algeria	Kenitra, Morocco
	Jraïdi 31', 53'; Redouani 89'	Report	Sidhoum 10'	Stadium: Stade Municipal de Kénitra

22 October 2018 Friendly	Morocco	0–1	Algeria	Salé, Morocco
14:00		Report	Marek 62'	Stadium: Centre sportif de Maâmora

== 2020 ==
28 January 2020 Friendly	Tunisia	1–2	Morocco	Stade Boubker Amer, Salé
	?? (??)	Report	Addi 13'; Knaidil 90'

31 January 2020 Friendly	Tunisia	3–6	Morocco	Stade Municipal de Témara, Témara
	Houij 7'; Lamti 60'; Ellouzi 82'	Report	Addi 10'; Salmi 13'; Tagnaout 37', 63'; Jraidi 71', 88'

14 February 2020 2020 UNAF Women's Tournament	Tunisia	0–1	Morocco	El Kram Stadium, El Kram
13:00		Report	Mssoudy 63'

20 February 2020 2020 UNAF Women's Tournament	Morocco	5–0	Mauritania	El Kram Stadium, El Kram
11:00	Amani 12'; Chebbak 20' (pen.), 38', 40'; Khirou 49'	Report

22 February 2020 2020 UNAF Women's Tournament	Algeria	0–2	Morocco	El Kram, Tunisia
11:00		Report	Chebbak 50'; Jraidi 86'	Stadium: El Kram Stadium

== 2021 ==
16 September Aisha Buhari Cup	Cameroon	0–1	Morocco	Nigeria
			Tagnaout 78'

19 September Aisha Buhari Cup	Morocco	0–0	Mali

21 October Friendly	Spain	3–0	Morocco	Cáceres
20:00	del Castillo 28', 68'; Sarriegi 60'			Stadium: Estadio Príncipe Felipe; Referee: Merima Čelik (Bosnia and Herzegovina)

30 November Friendly	Morocco	2–0	Senegal
	S. Hassani 82'; Mssoudy 90+3'

== 2022 ==
19 February Malta International Tournament	Morocco	1–0	Malta	Paola, Malta
16:00 UTC+1	Mssoudy 28'	Report		Stadium: Hibernians Stadium

22 February Malta International Tournament	Morocco	4–0	Moldova	Paola, Malta
16:00 UTC+1	Saoud 5'; Ayane 34'; Redouani 37'; Chebbak 52' (pen.)	Report		Stadium: Hibernians Stadium

7 April International Friendly	Morocco	6–1	Gambia	Rabat, Morocco
	Mrabet 11'; Saoud 24'; Ayane 33'; Amani 62', 85'; Chebbak 69' (.pen)	Report	Jatta 83'	Stadium: Stade Prince Moulay Abdallah

12 April International Friendly	Morocco	2–0	Ghana
	Ayane 49', 76'

11 June International Friendly	Morocco	7–0	Congo	Rabat, Morocco
21:00 GMT+1	Mssoudy 6'; Seghir 33'; Boukhami 36'; Hassani 47', 81'; Amani 54', 76'	Report		Stadium: Prince Moulay Abdellah Stadium

18 June International Friendly	Morocco	1–1	Zambia	Rabat, Morocco
21:00 GMT+1	Zulu 62' (.og)	Report	Chanda 77'	Stadium: Prince Moulay Abdellah Stadium

23 June International Friendly	Morocco	0–0	Ivory Coast	Rabat, Morocco
21:00 GMT+1				Stadium: Prince Moulay Abdellah Stadium

2 July 2022 2022 AFWCON GS	Morocco	1–0	Burkina Faso	Rabat, Morocco
21:30	Chebbak 29'			Stadium: Prince Moulay Abdellah Stadium; Referee: Salima Mukansanga (Rwanda)

5 July 2022 2022 AFWCON GS	Uganda	1–3	Morocco	Rabat, Morocco
21:00	Komuntale 32'		Ayane 14' (pen.); El Chad 32'; Chebbak 84' (pen.)	Stadium: Prince Moulay Abdellah Stadium; Referee: Vincentia Amedome (Togo)

8 July 2022 2022 AFWCON GS	Morocco	1–0	Senegal	Rabat, Morocco
21:00	Chebbak 55' (pen.)			Stadium: Prince Moulay Abdellah Stadium; Referee: Akhona Makalima (South Africa)

13 July 2022 2022 WAFCON QF	Morocco	2–1	Botswana	Rabat, Morocco
21:00	Mssoudy 3'; Mrabet 59'	Report	Dithebe 7'	Stadium: Prince Moulay Abdellah Stadium; Referee: Vincentia Amedome (Togo)

18 July 2022 2022 AFWCON SF	Morocco	1–1 (a.e.t.) (5–4 p)	Nigeria	Rabat, Morocco
21:00	Mssoudy 66'		Mrabet 62' (o.g.)	Stadium: Prince Moulay Abdellah Stadium; Referee: Maria Rivet (Mauritius)
	Penalties
	Mrabet (penalty scored); Chebbak (penalty scored); Redouani (penalty scored); El Chad (penalty scored); Ayane (penalty scored)		(penalty scored) Chikwelu; (penalty missed) Onumonu; (penalty scored) Otu; (penalty scored) Plumptre; (penalty scored) Monday

23 July 2022 2022 AFWCON F	Morocco	1–2	South Africa	Rabat, Morocco
21:00	Ayane 80'		Magaia 63', 71'	Stadium: Prince Moulay Abdellah Stadium; Referee: Salima Mukansanga (Rwanda)

6 October International Friendly	Poland	4–0	Morocco	Jerez, Spain
				Stadium: Estadio Municipal de Chapín

10 October International Friendly	Canada	4–0	Morocco	Jerez, Spain
				Stadium: Estadio Municipal de Chapín

11 November International Friendly	Republic of Ireland	2–2	Morocco	Marbella, Spain
				Stadium: Marbella Football Center

14 November International Friendly	Republic of Ireland	4–0	Morocco	Marbella, Spain
				Stadium: Marbella Football Center

== 2023 ==
17 February International Friendly	Slovakia	0–3	Morocco	Antalya, Turkey
		Report	Ayane 48'; Tagnaout 61'; Mrabet 77'

21 February International Friendly	Bosnia and Herzegovina	0–2	Morocco	Antalya, Turkey
15:00 UTC+1		Report	Ayane 7'; El Chad 39'

6 April International Friendly	Czech Republic	2–0	Morocco	Chomutov, Czechia
20:30 UTC+1	Szewieczková 45', 73'			Stadium: Letní stadion

11 April International Friendly	Romania	1–0	Morocco	Bucharest, Romania
17:30

1 July Friendly	Italy	0–0	Morocco	Ferrara, Italy
18:15 UTC+2				Stadium: Paolo Mazza stadium Referee: Ioanna Allayitou (Cyprus)

5 July International Friendly	Switzerland	0–0	Morocco	TBC, Switzerland

16 July International Friendly	Jamaica	1–0	Morocco	Melbourne, Australia
				Stadium: B.T. Connor Reserve

24 July FIFA WC GS	Germany	6–0	Morocco	Melbourne, Australia
18:30 UTC+10	Popp 11', 39'; Bühl 46'; El Haj 54' (o.g.); Mrabet 79' (o.g.); Schüller 90'	Report		Stadium: Melbourne Rectangular Stadium; Attendance: 27,256; Referee: Tori Penso (United States)

30 July FIFA WC GS	South Korea	0–1	Morocco	Adelaide, Australia
14:00 UTC+9:30		Report	Jraïdi 6'	Stadium: Hindmarsh Stadium; Attendance: 12,886; Referee: Edina Alves Batista (Brazil)

3 August FIFA WC GS	Morocco	1–0	Colombia	Perth, Australia
18:00 UTC+8	Lahmari 45+4'	Report		Stadium: Perth Rectangular Stadium; Attendance: 17,342; Referee: Maria Sole Ferrieri Caputi (Italy)

8 August 2023 FIFA WC R16	France	4–0	Morocco	Adelaide, Australia
20:30 UTC+9:30	Diani 15'; Dali 20'; Le Sommer 23', 70'	Report		Stadium: Hindmarsh Stadium; Attendance: 13,557; Referee: Tori Penso (United States)

22 September International Friendly	Morocco	0–2	Zambia	Casablanca
19:00 UTC+1		Report	B. Banda 50' (pen.), 69'	Stadium: Père Jégo Stadium

26 September International Friendly	Morocco	2–6	Zambia	Rabat
19:00 UTC+1	Ouzraoui 38'; Ayane 83'	Report	Kundananji 20', 40', 89'; B. Banda 43' (pen.), 56', 79'	Stadium: Moulay Hassan Stadium

26 October 2024 Olympic qualifying	Namibia	0–2	Morocco	Marrakesh
20:00 UTC+1	El Chad 20'; Lahmari 78'	Report		Stadium: Marrakesh Stadium

31 October 2024 Olympic qualifying	Morocco	2–0 (4–0 agg.)	Namibia	Rabat
				Stadium: Moulay Hassan Stadium
Note: Morocco won 4–0 on aggregate.

1 December International Friendly	Morocco	1–1	Uganda	Casablanca, Morocco
19:00 UTC+1	Nakkach 63'		Najjemba 8' (pen.)	Stadium: Père Jégo Stadium; Referee: Rokiatou Fofana (Mali)

5 December International Friendly	Morocco	3–0	Uganda	Rabat
19:00 UTC+1				Stadium: Moulay Hassan Stadium

== 2024 ==
23 February 2024 2024 Olympic qualifying	Tunisia	1–2	Morocco	Soliman, Tunisia
	Kaabachi 51'		Tagnaout 43'; Chebbak 54'	Stadium: Stade municipal de Soliman

28 February 2024 2024 Olympic qualifying	Morocco	4–1 (6–2 agg.)	Tunisia	Rabat
	Tagnaout 11'; Jraïdi 16', 20', 22'		Zemzem 58'	Stadium: Moulay Hassan Stadium
Note: Morocco won 6–2 on aggregate.

5 April 2024 2024 Olympic qualifying	Zambia	1–2	Morocco	Ndola, Zambia
17:00 UTC+2	Mweemba 80'		Redouani 45'; Ayane 90+4'	Stadium: Levy Mwanawasa Stadium

9 April 2024 2024 Olympic qualifying	Morocco	0–2 (a.e.t.) (2–3 agg.)	Zambia	Rabat
20:00 UTC+0			B. Banda 39', 105+2' (pen.)	Stadium: Moulay Hassan Stadium; Referee: Salima Mukansanga (Rwanda)
Note: Zambia won 3–2 on aggregate.

30 May 2024 Friendly	Morocco	2–1	DR Congo	Berkane, Morocco
19:00 UTC+1	Chapelle 71'; Jraïdi 89'	Report; Report (FRMF)	Er-Rmichi 77' (o.g.)	Stadium: Berkane Municipal Stadium

3 June 2024 Friendly	Morocco	3–2	DR Congo	Berkane, Morocco
19:00 UTC+1	Jraïdi 39', 43', 73'		Mrabet 3' (o.g.); Kipoyi (red card) 59'; Kabakaba 90+1'	Stadium: Berkane Municipal Stadium; Referee: Emna Ajbouni (Tunisia)

25 October 2024 Friendly	Morocco	4–1	Tanzania	Casablanca, Morocco
19:00 UTC+1	Jraïdi 27'; Bahera 56' (o.g.); Chebbak 73'; Chapelle 78'	Report	Kasonga 42'	Stadium: Père Jégo Stadium; Referee: Yacine Samassa (Mauritania)

29 October 2024 Friendly	Morocco	7–0	Senegal	Casablanca, Morocco
19:00 UTC+1	Jraïdi 8' (pen.), 55'; Mrabet 17'; Kassi 28'; Tagnaout 45'; Chapelle 86'; Boutiebi 90+3'	Report		Stadium: Père Jégo Stadium; Referee: Teneba Bagayoko (Mali)

28 November 2024 Friendly	Morocco	3–1	Botswana	Tétouan, Morocco
18:00 UTC+1	Jraïdi 6', 45'; Kassi 40'	Report	Moloi 71'	Stadium: Saniat Rmel Stadium; Referee: Aida Sy (Senegal)

3 December 2024 Friendly	Morocco	1–0	Mali	Tétouan, Morocco
18:00 UTC+1	Jraïdi 7'	Report		Stadium: Saniat Rmel Stadium; Referee: Zomadre Kore (Ivory Coast)

== 2025 ==
15 June 2025 Friendly	Morocco	1–0	Cape Verde	Salé, Morocco
17:00 UTC+1	Jraïdi 66'	Report		Stadium: Mohamed VI Football Complex

19 June 2025 Friendly	Morocco	4–2	Malawi	Kenitra, Morocco
20:30 UTC+1	Badri 40'; Ouzraoui 43'; Jraïdi 56'; Chapelle 90+4'	Report	Ta. Chawinga 27' (pen.); Kadzere 35'	Stadium: Kenitra Municipal Stadium; Referee: Aida Sy (Senegal)

28 June 2025 Friendly	Morocco	4–0	Tanzania	Rabat, Morocco
20:30 UTC+1	Jraïdi 28' (pen.); Chebbak 45'; I. El Ghazouani 68'; Badri 75'	Report		Stadium: Olympic Stadium; Referee: Zakia El Grini (Morocco)

5 July WAFCON 2024 GS	Morocco	2–2	Zambia	Rabat, Morocco
21:00	Jraïdi 12' (pen.); Chebbak 87'	Report	Banda 1'; Kundananji 27'	Stadium: Olympic Stadium; Referee: Shamirah Nabadda (Uganda)

9 July WAFCON 2024 GS	DR Congo	2–4	Morocco	Rabat, Morocco
20:00	Kanjinga 6'; Mawete 70'	Report	Chebbak 25', 43', 76'; Mrabet 83' (pen.)	Stadium: Olympic Stadium; Referee: Antsino Twanyanyukwa (Namibia)

12 July WAFCON 2024 GS	Morocco	1–0	Senegal	Rabat, Morocco
20:00	Mrabet 45+2' (pen.)	Report		Stadium: Olympic Stadium; Referee: Shamirah Nabadda (Uganda)

18 July WAFCON 2024 QF	Morocco	3–1	Mali	Rabat, Morocco
21:00	Jraïdi 7', 79' (pen.); Chapelle 89'	Report	A. Traoré 90+7' (pen.)	Stadium: Olympic Stadium; Referee: Akhona Makalima (South Africa)

22 July 2025 CAF WAFCON 2024 SF	Morocco	1–1 (a.e.t.) (4–2 p)	Ghana	Rabat, Morocco
21:00	Ouzraoui 55'	Report	Nyamekye 26'	Stadium: Olympic Stadium; Referee: Suavis Iratunga (Burundi)
	Penalties
	Aït El Haj (penalty scored); Jraïdi (penalty scored); Chapelle (penalty scored); Lahmari (penalty scored)		(penalty scored) Bonsu; (penalty scored) Kusi; (penalty missed) Badu; (penalty missed) Yeboah

26 July CAF WAFCON 2024 Final	Morocco	2–3	Nigeria	Rabat, Morocco
21:00	Chebbak 12'; Mssoudy 24'	Report	Okoronkwo 64' (pen.); Ijamilusi 71'; Echegini 88'	Stadium: Olympic Stadium; Referee: Antsino Twanyanyukwa (Namibia)

24 October Friendly	Morocco	1−2	Scotland	Casablanca, Morocco
19:30 UTC+1	Nakkach 80'		Cuthbert 39'; Weir 88'	Stadium: Stade Pere Jego,

28 October Friendly	Morocco	3−0	Haiti	Casablanca, Morocco
19:30 UTC+1	Saoud 18'; Chebbak 50'; Jraïdi 70'	Report		Stadium: Stade Pere Jego,

28 November 2025 Friendly	Morocco	1–1	Burkina Faso	Marrakesh, Morocco
19:00 UTC+1	Jraïdi 45+1'		Kabré 58'	Stadium: Marrakech Stadium

2 December 2025 Friendly	Morocco	0–2	South Africa	Agadir, Morocco
19:00 UTC+2	Mthandi 70'; Cesane 86'			Stadium: Adrar Stadium

== 2026 ==
27 February Friendly	Morocco	5–0	Burkina Faso	Rabat, Morocco
23:00 UTC+1	Mssoudy 4', 6'; Jraïdi 33', 57'; Mrabet 45'	Report		Stadium: Al Medina Stadium; Referee: Dorsaf Ganouati (Tunisia)

3 March Friendly	Morocco	1–1	Burkina Faso	Rabat, Morocco
23:00 UTC+1	Mssoudy 90+4'	Report	Kabré 80'	Stadium: Al Medina Stadium

7 April Friendly	Morocco	3–0	Cape Verde	Rabat, Morocco
21:00 UTC+1				Stadium: Moulay El Hassan Stadium

13 April Friendly	Morocco	3–0	Tanzania	Rabat, Morocco
21:00 UTC+1	Mssoudy 4', 77'; Mrabet 80'	Report		Stadium: Moulay El Hassan Stadium

17 April Friendly	Morocco	Cancelled	Ghana	Rabat, Morocco
18:30 UTC+1				Stadium: Moulay El Hassan Stadium

17 April Friendly	Morocco	1–1	Mali	Rabat, Morocco
18:30 UTC+1	Jraïdi 61'	Report	A. Traoré 45+4'	Stadium: Moulay El Hassan Stadium; Referee: Dorsaf Ganouati (Tunisia)

5 June Friendly	Morocco	4–2	Benin	Rabat, Morocco
19:00 UTC+1	Jraïdi 13'; Ouzraoui 26' (pen.); Nakkach 43'; Nassi 80'	Report	Sadikou 23'; Fachinan 88'	Stadium: Moulay El Hassan Stadium

10 June Friendly	New Zealand	0–0	Morocco	Malaga, Spain
18:00 UTC+2				Stadium: Nuevo Estadio El Maulí

26 July 2026 2026 WAFCON GS	Morocco	4–0	Kenya	Rabat, Morocco
21:00 UTC+1	Ouzraoui 19'; Atiq 29'; Jraïdi 32', 47'	Report (FIFA)		Stadium: Moulay El Hassan Stadium; Referee: Vincentia Amedome (Togo)

30 July 2026 2026 WAFCON GS	Morocco	1–0	Algeria	Rabat, Morocco
21:00 UTC+1	Mssoudy 84'	Report (FIFA)		Stadium: Moulay El Hassan Stadium; Referee: Aline Guimbang Etong (Cameroon)

1 August 2026 WAFCON GS	Senegal	0–0	Morocco	Rabat, Morocco
21:00 UTC+1		Report (FIFA)		Stadium: Moulay El Hassan Stadium; Referee: Shamirah Nabadda (Uganda)

8 August 2026 WAFCON QF	Morocco	2–1	South Africa	Rabat, Morocco
21:00 UTC+1	Ouzraoui 31'; Aït El Haj 51' (pen.)	Report (FIFA)	Kgatlana 67'	Stadium: Moulay El Hassan Stadium; Referee: Josephine Wanjiku (Kenya)

12 August 2026 2026 WAFCON SF	Morocco	0–0 (a.e.t.) (1–3 p)	Cameroon	Rabat, Morocco
18:00 UTC+1		Report (FIFA)		Stadium: Moulay El Hassan Stadium; Referee: Vincentia Amedome (Togo)
	Penalties
	Aït El Haj (penalty scored); Chapelle (penalty missed); Atiq (penalty missed); Ouzraoui (penalty missed)		(penalty scored) Ngah Manga; (penalty missed) Mendoua; (penalty scored) Rose; (penalty scored) Nyadjou

15 August 2026 2026 WAFCON TPM	Morocco	1–1 (2–3 p)	Algeria	Rabat, Morocco
18:00 UTC+1	Azraf 37'	Report (FIFA)	Boussaha 83'	Stadium: Rabat Olympic Stadium; Referee: Josphine Wanjiku (Kenya)
	Penalties
	Redouani (penalty missed); Nakkach (penalty scored); Boutiebi (penalty scored); Mourtaji (penalty missed); Badri (penalty missed)		(penalty scored) Dafeur; (penalty missed) Braham; (penalty scored) Bekhaled; (penalty missed) Khezami; (penalty scored) Belloumou

9 October 2028 Summer Olympics qualifying	Congo	Cancelled	Morocco	Brazzaville, Congo
15:00 UTC+1				Stadium: Alphonse Massemba-Débat Stadium

13 October 2028 Summer Olympics qualifying	Morocco	Cancelled	Congo	Morocco
20:00 UTC+1
