= 2023 FIFA Women's World Cup Group H =

Football tournament teams

Group H of the 2023 FIFA Women's World Cup was one of eight groups that formed the opening round of the tournament with the matches played from 24 July to 3 August 2023. The group consisted of Germany, Morocco, Colombia and South Korea. The top two teams, Colombia and Morocco, advanced to the round of 16.

Germany were eliminated in the Women's World Cup group stage for the first time ever, while Morocco advanced to the knockouts in their first Women's World Cup campaign, as well as being the sole debutant to advance to the last 16. Colombia advanced to the round of 16 for only second time in their third Women's World Cup; they previously advanced in 2015, which was also the sole occasion that South Korea progressed past the first round.

== Teams ==
Draw position	Team	Pot	Confederation	Method of qualification	Date of qualification	Finals appearance	Last appearance	Previous best performance	FIFA Rankings	
Draw position	Team	Pot	Confederation	Method of qualification	Date of qualification	Finals appearance	Last appearance	Previous best performance	October 2022 (Note: The rankings of October 2022 were used for seeding for the final draw.)	June 2023
H1	Germany	1	UEFA	UEFA Group H winners	3 September 2022	9th	2019	Winners (2003, 2007)	3	2
H2	Morocco	4	CAF	2022 Women's Africa Cup of Nations runners-up	13 July 2022	1st	—	Debut	76	72
H3	Colombia	3	CONMEBOL	2022 Copa América Femenina runners-up	25 July 2022	3rd	2015	Round of 16 (2015)	27	25
H4	South Korea	2	AFC	2022 AFC Women's Asian Cup runners-up	30 January 2022	4th	2019	Round of 16 (2015)	17	17

== Standings ==
Pos	Team	Pld	W	D	L	GF	GA	GD	Pts	Qualification
1	Colombia	3	2	0	1	4	2	+2	6	Advance to knockout stage
2	Morocco	3	2	0	1	2	6	−4	6	Advance to knockout stage
3	Germany	3	1	1	1	8	3	+5	4	
4	South Korea	3	0	1	2	1	4	−3	1	

Source: FIFA
Rules for classification: Group stage tiebreakers

In the round of 16:

- The winners of Group H, Colombia, advanced to play the runners-up of Group F, Jamaica.
- The runners-up of Group H, Morocco, advanced to play the winners of Group F, France.

== Matches ==
All times listed are local.

=== Germany vs Morocco ===
24 July 2023
18:30 UTC+10

Germany	6–0	Morocco
Popp 11', 39'; Bühl 46'; Aït El Haj 54' (o.g.); Redouani 79' (o.g.); Schüller 90'	Report

Melbourne Rectangular Stadium, Melbourne
Attendance: 27,256
Referee: Tori Penso (United States)

Germany	Morocco

GK	1	Merle Frohms
RB	9	Svenja Huth
CB	3	Kathrin Hendrich
CB	23	Sara Doorsoun
LB	17	Felicitas Rauch		(substituted off) 89'
CM	13	Sara Däbritz
CM	18	Melanie Leupolz		(substituted off) 64'
RW	22	Jule Brand
AM	20	Lina Magull		(substituted off) 64'
LW	19	Klara Bühl		(substituted off) 64'
CF	11	Alexandra Popp (c)		(substituted off) 82'
Substitutions:
MF	14	Lena Lattwein		(substituted on) 64'
FW	7	Lea Schüller		(substituted on) 64'
FW	16	Nicole Anyomi	(yellow card) 75'	(substituted on) 64'
FW	10	Laura Freigang		(substituted on) 82'
MF	2	Chantal Hagel		(substituted on) 89'
Manager:
Martina Voss-Tecklenburg

GK	1	Khadija Er-Rmichi
RB	4	Sarah Kassi
CB	17	Hanane Aït El Haj
CB	21	Yasmin Mrabet	(substituted off) 82'
LB	2	Zineb Redouani
RM	19	Sakina Ouzraoui	(substituted off) 90+5'
CM	6	Élodie Nakkach	(substituted off) 82'
CM	7	Ghizlane Chebbak (c)
LM	11	Fatima Tagnaout
CF	23	Rosella Ayane	(substituted off) 90+5'
CF	16	Anissa Lahmari	(substituted off) 67'
Substitutions:
MF	8	Salma Amani	(substituted on) 67'
MF	10	Najat Badri	(substituted on) 82'
DF	5	Nesryne El Chad	(substituted on) 82'
FW	20	Sofia Bouftini	(substituted on) 90+5'
FW	9	Ibtissam Jraïdi	(substituted on) 90+5'
Manager:
(France) Reynald Pedros

Player of the Match:
Alexandra Popp (Germany)

Assistant referees:
Brooke Mayo (United States)
Mijensa Rensch (Suriname)
Fourth official:
Akhona Makalima (South Africa)
Video assistant referee:
Carol Anne Chenard (Canada)
Assistant video assistant referee:
Muhammad Taqi (Singapore)
Offside video assistant referee:
Neuza Back (Brazil)

=== Colombia vs South Korea ===
25 July 2023
12:00 UTC+10

Colombia	2–0	South Korea
Usme 30' (pen.); Caicedo 39'	Report

Sydney Football Stadium, Sydney
Attendance: 24,323
Referee: Rebecca Welch (England)

Colombia	South Korea

GK	1	Catalina Pérez
RB	17	Carolina Arias	(yellow card) 45+6'
CB	19	Jorelyn Carabalí
CB	3	Daniela Arias
LB	2	Manuela Vanegas	(yellow card) 10'
CM	5	Lorena Bedoya
CM	6	Daniela Montoya (c)		(substituted off) 87'
RW	18	Linda Caicedo
AM	10	Leicy Santos		(substituted off) 76'
LW	9	Mayra Ramírez
CF	11	Catalina Usme
Substitutions:
MF	8	Marcela Restrepo		(substituted on) 76'
MF	4	Diana Ospina		(substituted on) 87'
Manager:
Angelo Marsiglia (Note: Colombia manager Nelson Abadía was given a two-match touchline ban in FIFA competitions due to an infringement from the 2022 Copa América Femenina. Assistant manager Angelo Marsiglia filled in as manager.)

GK	1	Yoon Young-geul
CB	20	Kim Hye-ri (c)
CB	6	Lim Seon-joo	(yellow card) 45+7'
CB	4	Shim Seo-yeon	(yellow card) 29'
RM	2	Choo Hyo-joo		(substituted off) 88'
CM	9	Lee Geum-min
CM	10	Ji So-yun
CM	8	Cho So-hyun		(substituted off) 68'
LM	16	Jang Sel-gi
CF	7	Son Hwa-yeon		(substituted off) 68'
CF	11	Choe Yu-ri		(substituted off) 78'
Substitutions:
FW	23	Kang Chae-rim		(substituted on) 68'
FW	13	Park Eun-sun		(substituted on) 68'
FW	19	Casey Phair		(substituted on) 78'
FW	12	Moon Mi-ra		(substituted on) 88'
Manager:
(England) Colin Bell

Player of the Match:
Linda Caicedo (Colombia)

Assistant referees:
Natalie Aspinall (England)
Anita Vad (Hungary)
Fourth official:
Marianela Araya (Costa Rica)
Video assistant referee:
Drew Fischer (Canada)
Assistant video assistant referee:
Armando Villarreal (United States)
Offside video assistant referee:
Sian Massey-Ellis (England)

=== South Korea vs Morocco ===
30 July 2023
14:00 UTC+9:30

South Korea	0–1	Morocco
	Report	Jraïdi 6'

Hindmarsh Stadium, Adelaide
Attendance: 12,886
Referee: Edina Alves Batista (Brazil)

South Korea	Morocco

GK	18	Kim Jung-mi
CB	20	Kim Hye-ri (c)
CB	3	Hong Hye-ji	(substituted off) 84'
CB	4	Shim Seo-yeon
RM	2	Choo Hyo-joo
CM	9	Lee Geum-min	(substituted off) 88'
CM	10	Ji So-yun
CM	8	Cho So-hyun	(substituted off) 46'
LM	16	Jang Sel-gi
CF	7	Son Hwa-yeon	(substituted off) 46'
CF	13	Park Eun-sun	(substituted off) 69'
Substitutions:
FW	11	Choe Yu-ri	(substituted on) 46'
FW	12	Moon Mi-ra	(substituted on) 46'
FW	14	Jeon Eun-ha	(substituted on) 69'
FW	19	Casey Phair	(substituted on) 84'
MF	15	Chun Ga-ram	(substituted on) 88'
Manager:
(England) Colin Bell

GK	1	Khadija Er-Rmichi
RB	17	Hanane Aït El Haj		(substituted off) 80'
CB	3	Nouhaila Benzina	(yellow card) 81'
CB	5	Nesryne El Chad
LB	2	Zineb Redouani
RM	19	Sakina Ouzraoui
CM	6	Élodie Nakkach		(substituted off) 80'
CM	7	Ghizlane Chebbak (c)
LM	11	Fatima Tagnaout
AM	8	Salma Amani		(substituted off) 69'
CF	9	Ibtissam Jraïdi		(substituted off) 74'
Substitutions:
MF	4	Sarah Kassi		(substituted on) 69'
FW	23	Rosella Ayane		(substituted on) 74'
MF	10	Najat Badri		(substituted on) 80'
FW	20	Sofia Bouftini		(substituted on) 80'
Manager:
(France) Reynald Pedros

Player of the Match:
Ibtissam Jraïdi (Morocco)

Assistant referees:
Neuza Back (Brazil)
Leila Moreira da Cruz (Brazil)
Fourth official:
Marianela Araya (Costa Rica)
Video assistant referee:
Daiane Muniz dos Santos (Brazil)
Assistant video assistant referee:
Alejandro Hernández Hernández (Spain)
Offside video assistant referee:
Mariana de Almeida (Argentina)

=== Germany vs Colombia ===
30 July 2023
19:30 UTC+10

Germany	1–2	Colombia
Popp 89' (pen.)	Report	Caicedo 52'; Vanegas 90+7'

Sydney Football Stadium, Sydney
Attendance: 40,499
Referee: Melissa Borjas (Honduras)

Germany	Colombia

GK	1	Merle Frohms
RB	9	Svenja Huth
CB	3	Kathrin Hendrich
CB	23	Sara Doorsoun		(substituted off) 46'
LB	2	Chantal Hagel
CM	6	Lena Oberdorf	(yellow card) 57'
CM	13	Sara Däbritz
RW	22	Jule Brand
AM	20	Lina Magull		(substituted off) 67'
LW	19	Klara Bühl		(substituted off) 76'
CF	11	Alexandra Popp (c)
Substitutions:
DF	15	Sjoeke Nüsken		(substituted on) 46'
FW	7	Lea Schüller		(substituted on) 67'
FW	16	Nicole Anyomi		(substituted on) 76'
Manager:
Martina Voss-Tecklenburg

GK	1	Catalina Pérez	(yellow card) 88'
RB	17	Carolina Arias
CB	19	Jorelyn Carabalí		(substituted off) 90+14'
CB	3	Daniela Arias
LB	2	Manuela Vanegas
RM	16	Lady Andrade		(substituted off) 54'
CM	5	Lorena Bedoya	(yellow card) 62'
CM	6	Daniela Montoya (c)		(substituted off) 67'
LM	18	Linda Caicedo		(substituted off) 90+6'
CF	9	Mayra Ramírez
CF	11	Catalina Usme
Substitutions:
MF	10	Leicy Santos		(substituted on) 54'
MF	4	Diana Ospina	(yellow card) 80'	(substituted on) 67'
MF	8	Marcela Restrepo		(substituted on) 90+6'
DF	20	Mónica Ramos		(substituted on) 90+14'
Manager:
Angelo Marsiglia

Player of the Match:
Linda Caicedo (Colombia)

Assistant referees:
Shirley Perello (Honduras)
Sandra Ramírez (Mexico)
Fourth official:
Yoshimi Yamashita (Japan)
Video assistant referee:
Armando Villarreal (United States)
Assistant video assistant referee:
Carol Anne Chenard (Canada)
Offside video assistant referee:
Guadalupe Porras Ayuso (Spain)

=== South Korea vs Germany ===
3 August 2023
20:00 UTC+10

South Korea	1–1	Germany
Cho So-hyun 6'	Report	Popp 42'

Lang Park, Brisbane
Attendance: 38,945
Referee: Anna-Marie Keighley (New Zealand)

South Korea	Germany

GK	18	Kim Jung-mi
RB	2	Choo Hyo-joo
CB	20	Kim Hye-ri (c)
CB	4	Shim Seo-yeon
LB	16	Jang Sel-gi
DM	17	Lee Young-ju
RM	15	Chun Ga-ram	(substituted off) 63'
CM	8	Cho So-hyun	(substituted off) 90+10'
CM	10	Ji So-yun
LM	11	Choe Yu-ri
CF	19	Casey Phair	(substituted off) 86'
Substitutions:
FW	13	Park Eun-sun	(substituted on) 63'
FW	12	Moon Mi-ra	(substituted on) 86'
FW	23	Kang Chae-rim	(substituted on) 90+10'
Manager:
(England) Colin Bell

GK	1	Merle Frohms
CB	3	Kathrin Hendrich
CB	5	Marina Hegering	(yellow card) 90+6'
CB	2	Chantal Hagel
RB	9	Svenja Huth
CM	6	Lena Oberdorf
CM	13	Sara Däbritz		(substituted off) 64'
LM	19	Klara Bühl		(substituted off) 64'
RF	22	Jule Brand		(substituted off) 84'
CF	7	Lea Schüller
LF	11	Alexandra Popp (c)
Substitutions:
MF	14	Lena Lattwein		(substituted on) 64'
MF	8	Sydney Lohmann		(substituted on) 64'
FW	16	Nicole Anyomi		(substituted on) 84'
Manager:
Martina Voss-Tecklenburg

Player of the Match:
Alexandra Popp (Germany)

Assistant referees:
Sarah Jones (New Zealand)
Maria Salamasina (Samoa)
Fourth official:
Marta Huerta de Aza (Spain)
Video assistant referee:
Pol van Boekel (Netherlands)
Assistant video assistant referee:
Muhammad Taqi (Singapore)
Offside video assistant referee:
Chantal Boudreau (Canada)

=== Morocco vs Colombia ===
3 August 2023
18:00 UTC+8

Morocco	1–0	Colombia
Lahmari 45+4'	Report

Perth Rectangular Stadium, Perth
Attendance: 17,342
Referee: Maria Sole Ferrieri Caputi (Italy)

Morocco	Colombia

GK	1	Khadija Er-Rmichi
RB	17	Hanane Aït El Haj
CB	5	Nesryne El Chad
CB	3	Nouhaila Benzina
LB	2	Zineb Redouani
RM	19	Sakina Ouzraoui
CM	6	Élodie Nakkach
CM	7	Ghizlane Chebbak (c)	(yellow card) 90+11'
LM	11	Fatima Tagnaout
CF	9	Ibtissam Jraïdi		(substituted off) 86'
CF	16	Anissa Lahmari		(substituted off) 71'
Substitutions:
MF	8	Salma Amani		(substituted on) 71'
FW	23	Rosella Ayane		(substituted on) 86'
Manager:
(France) Reynald Pedros

GK	1	Catalina Pérez
RB	17	Carolina Arias		(substituted off) 90+1'
CB	19	Jorelyn Carabalí
CB	3	Daniela Arias
LB	2	Manuela Vanegas	(yellow card) 51'
RM	18	Linda Caicedo
CM	5	Lorena Bedoya		(substituted off) 86'
CM	6	Daniela Montoya (c)		(substituted off) 59'
LM	10	Leicy Santos
CF	9	Mayra Ramírez
CF	11	Catalina Usme
Substitutions:
MF	4	Diana Ospina		(substituted on) 59'
FW	21	Ivonne Chacón		(substituted on) 86'
MF	8	Marcela Restrepo		(substituted on) 90+1'
Manager:
Nelson Abadía

Player of the Match:
Anissa Lahmari (Morocco)

Assistant referees:
Francesca Di Monte (Italy)
Mihaela Tepusa (Romania)
Fourth official:
Akhona Makalima (South Africa)
Video assistant referee:
Carol Anne Chenard (Canada)
Assistant video assistant referee:
Drew Fischer (Canada)
Offside video assistant referee:
Sian Massey-Ellis (England)

== Discipline ==
Fair play points would have been used as tiebreakers in the group should the overall and head-to-head records of teams were tied. These were calculated based on yellow and red cards received in all group matches as follows:

- first yellow card: minus 1 point;
- indirect red card (second yellow card): minus 3 points;
- direct red card: minus 4 points;
- yellow card and direct red card: minus 5 points;

Only one of the above deductions was applied to a player in a single match.

Team	Match 1				Match 2				Match 3				Points
Team	Booked	(yellow card) (yellow-red card)	Sent off (straight red)	(yellow card) (red card)	Booked	(yellow card) (yellow-red card)	Sent off (straight red)	(yellow card) (red card)	Booked	(yellow card) (yellow-red card)	Sent off (straight red)	(yellow card) (red card)	Points
Morocco					1				1				–2
South Korea	2												–2
Germany	1				1				1				–3
Colombia	2				3				1				–6

== See also ==
- Colombia at the FIFA Women's World Cup
- Germany at the FIFA Women's World Cup
- Morocco at the FIFA Women's World Cup
- South Korea at the FIFA Women's World Cup
