= 2025 CAF Women's Champions League UNAF Qualifiers =

تصفيات إتحاد شمال إفريقيا المؤهلة لدوري أبطال إفريقيا للسيدات 2025

Tournament details
- Host country: Tunisia
- Cities: Sousse, Monastir
- Dates: 31 August–9 September
- Teams: 4 (from 4 associations)

Final positions
- Champions: (Morocco) AS FAR (3rd title)
- Runners-up: (Egypt) FC Masar
- Third place: (Algeria) Afak Relizane
- Fourth place: (Tunisia) ASF Sousse

Tournament statistics
- Matches played: 6
- Goals scored: 24 (4 per match)
- Top scorer(s): (Egypt) Yasmin Mohamed (4 goals)
- All statistics correct as of 10 September 2025.

The 2025 CAF Women's Champions League UNAF Qualifiers will be the 5th edition of the CAF Women's Champions League UNAF Qualifiers tournament organised by the UNAF for the women's clubs of association nations. The tournament was held in Tunisia from 31 August to 9 September 2025, to determine the UNAF representative in the 2025 CAF Women's Champions League final tournament.

== Participating teams ==
The following four teams contested in the qualifying tournament. The draw took place on Wednesday, 7 August 2025 in Cairo, Egypt.

Team	Qualifying method	Appearances	Previous best performance
(Algeria) Afak Relizane	2024–25 Algerian Women's runners-up	4th	Second place (2021, 2023)
(Egypt) FC Masar	2024–25 Egyptian Women's Premier League Champions	2nd	Second place (2024)
(Morocco) AS FAR	2024–25 Moroccan Women's Championship champions	3rd	Champions (2021, 2024)
(Tunisia) ASF Sousse	2024–25 Tunisian Women's champions	3rd	Fourth place (2023, 2024)

== Venues ==
2025 CAF Women's Champions League UNAF Qualifiers is located in Tunisia	Sousse	Monastir
2025 CAF Women's Champions League UNAF Qualifiers is located in Tunisia	Sousse Olympic Stadium	Mustapha Ben Jannet Stadium
2025 CAF Women's Champions League UNAF Qualifiers is located in Tunisia	Capacity: 40,000	Capacity: 20,000

== Match officials ==
The following referees were chosen for the tournament.

=== Referees ===
- (Algeria) Ghada Mehat
- (Egypt) Noura Samir
- (Morocco) Zouleikha Harmasse
- (Tunisia) Emna Ajbouni

=== Assistant referees ===
- (Algeria) Sara Kemmad
- (Algeria) Asma Feriel Ouahab
- (Egypt) Gamalat Ahmed
- (Egypt) Amal Hassan
- (Morocco) Ihssane En-nouajeli
- (Morocco) Karima Khadiri
- (Tunisia) Khouloud Amri
- (Tunisia) Nesrine Ouertatani

== Qualifying tournament ==
=== Standings ===
Pos	Team	Pld	W	D	L	GF	GA	GD	Pts	Qualification	FAR	MAS	AFA	ASF
1	(Morocco) AS FAR	3	3	0	0	11	1	+10	9	Main tournament	—	1–3	4–0	
2	(Egypt) FC Masar	3	2	0	1	11	4	+7	6			—		6–0
3	(Algeria) Afak Relizane	3	1	0	2	2	8	−6	3			1–4	—	
4	(Tunisia) ASF Sousse (H)	3	0	0	3	0	11	−11	0		0–4		0–1	—

Source: UNAF
(H) Hosts

=== Matches ===
2 September 2025
16:00

FC Masar (Egypt)	1–3	(Morocco) AS FAR
Mahira Ali 90+3'	Report	El Madani 8'; Redouani 83'; Lahmari 90+6'

Mustapha Ben Jannet Stadium, Monastir
Referee: Emna Ajbouni (Tunisia)
2 September 2025
19:00

ASF Sousse (Tunisia)	0–1	(Algeria) Afak Relizane
	Report	Sehoul 59'

Sousse Olympic Stadium, Sousse
Referee: Zouleikha Harmasse (Morocco)

5 September 2025
16:00

AS FAR (Morocco)	4–0	(Algeria) Afak Relizane
Mssoudy 10'; Aït El Haj 39' (pen.); Benzina 45+3'; Gnammi 81'

Mustapha Ben Jannet Stadium, Monastir
Referee: Noura Samir (Egypt)
5 September 2025
19:00

FC Masar (Egypt)	6–0	(Tunisia) ASF Sousse
Yasmin Mohamed 7', 31' (pen.), 45+2' (pen.); Farah Hisham 15'; Qassis 72'; Mahira Ali 90' (pen.)

Sousse Olympic Stadium, Sousse
Referee: Zouleikha Harmasse (Morocco)

8 September 2025
16:00

Afak Relizane (Algeria)	1–4	(Egypt) FC Masar
Barkate 69'		Yasmin Mohamed 78' (pen.); Nour Abdelwahed 83'; Ogebe 90'; Qassis 90+4'

Mustapha Ben Jannet Stadium, Monastir
Referee: Emna Ajbouni (Tunisia)
8 September 2025
19:00

ASF Sousse (Tunisia)	0–4	(Morocco) AS FAR
		Aït El Haj 21'; Badri 27', 88'; Mssoudy 74'

Sousse Olympic Stadium, Sousse
Referee: Noura Samir (Egypt)

== Statistics ==
=== Goalscorers ===
There have been 21 goals scored in 6 matches, for an average of 3.5 goals per match (as of 10 September 2025).

Rank	Player	Team	Goals
1	(Egypt) Yasmin Mohamed	(Egypt) FC Masar	4
2	(Egypt) Mahira Ali	(Egypt) FC Masar	2
2	(Palestine) Miral Qassis	(Egypt) FC Masar	2
2	(Morocco) Hanane Aït El Haj	(Morocco) AS FAR	2
2	(Morocco) Sanaâ Mssoudy	(Morocco) AS FAR	2
6	(Algeria) Zyneb Barkate	(Algeria) Afak Relizane	1
6	(Algeria) Hanane Sehoul	(Algeria) Afak Relizane	1
6	(Egypt) Nour Abdelwahed	(Egypt) FC Masar	1
6	(Egypt) Farah Hisham	(Egypt) FC Masar	1
6	(Nigeria) Alice Ogebe	(Egypt) FC Masar	1
6	(Morocco) Najat Badri	(Morocco) AS FAR	1
6	(Morocco) Nouhaila Benzina	(Morocco) AS FAR	1
6	(Morocco) Doha El Madani	(Morocco) AS FAR	1
6	(Benin) Yolande Gnammi	(Morocco) AS FAR	1
6	(Morocco) Anissa Lahmari	(Morocco) AS FAR	1
6	(Morocco) Zineb Redouani	(Morocco) AS FAR	1

== Broadcasting rights ==
Territory	Broadcaster	Ref.
North Africa	UNAF YouTube Channel	
