= 2023 FIFA Women's World Cup knockout stage =

The knockout stage of the 2023 FIFA Women's World Cup was the second and final stage of the competition, following the group stage. It began on 5 August with the round of 16 and ended on 20 August with the final match, held at the Stadium Australia in Sydney. The top two teams from each group (sixteen in total) advanced to the knockout stage to compete in a single-elimination style tournament.

All times listed are local.

== Format ==
In the knockout stage, if a match was level at the end of 90 minutes of normal playing time, extra time was played (two periods of 15 minutes each), where each team was allowed to make a sixth substitution. If still tied after extra time, the match was decided by a penalty shoot-out to determine the winner.

== Qualified teams ==
The top two placed teams from each of the eight groups qualified for the knockout stage.

Group	Winners	Runners-up
A	Switzerland	Norway
B	Australia	Nigeria
C	Japan	Spain
D	England	Denmark
E	Netherlands	United States
F	France	Jamaica
G	Sweden	South Africa
H	Colombia	Morocco

== Bracket ==
Round of 16
5 August – Auckland
Switzerland	1
Spain	5
6 August – Sydney (SFS)
Netherlands	2
South Africa	0
5 August – Wellington
Japan	3
Norway	1
6 August – Melbourne
Sweden (p)	0 (5)
United States	0 (4)
7 August – Sydney (SA)
Australia	2
Denmark	0
8 August – Adelaide
France	4
Morocco	0
7 August – Brisbane
England (p)	0 (4)
Nigeria	0 (2)
8 August – Melbourne
Colombia	1
Jamaica	0

Quarter-finals
11 August – Wellington
Spain (a.e.t.)	2
Netherlands	1
11 August – Auckland
Japan	1
Sweden	2
12 August – Brisbane
Australia (p)	0 (7)
France	0 (6)
12 August – Sydney (SA)
England	2
Colombia	1

Semi-finals
15 August – Auckland
Spain	2
Sweden	1
16 August – Sydney (SA)
Australia	1
England	3

Final
20 August – Sydney (SA)
Spain	1
England	0
Third place play-off
19 August – Brisbane
Sweden	2
Australia	0

== Round of 16 ==
=== Switzerland vs Spain ===
5 August 2023
17:00 UTC+12

Switzerland	1–5	Spain
Codina 11' (o.g.)	Report	Bonmatí 5', 36'; Redondo 17'; Codina 45'; Hermoso 70'

Eden Park, Auckland
Attendance: 43,217
Referee: Cheryl Foster (Wales)

Switzerland	Spain

GK	1	Gaëlle Thalmann
RB	19	Eseosa Aigbogun		(substituted off) 46'
CB	5	Noelle Maritz
CB	2	Julia Stierli	(yellow card) 73'
LB	8	Nadine Riesen		(substituted off) 84'
DM	13	Lia Wälti (c)
CM	11	Coumba Sow		(substituted off) 46'
CM	6	Géraldine Reuteler		(substituted off) 46'
RF	17	Seraina Piubel		(substituted off) 75'
CF	10	Ramona Bachmann
LF	9	Ana Maria Crnogorčević
Substitutions:
MF	16	Sandrine Mauron		(substituted on) 46'
FW	22	Meriame Terchoun		(substituted on) 46'
DF	18	Viola Calligaris		(substituted on) 46'
FW	20	Fabienne Humm		(substituted on) 75'
DF	3	Lara Marti		(substituted on) 84'
Manager:
(Germany) Inka Grings

GK	23	Cata Coll
RB	12	Oihane Hernández
CB	4	Irene Paredes
CB	14	Laia Codina
LB	2	Ona Batlle
DM	3	Teresa Abelleira	(substituted off) 64'
CM	6	Aitana Bonmatí	(substituted off) 77'
CM	10	Jennifer Hermoso	(substituted off) 77'
RF	17	Alba Redondo
CF	9	Esther González (c)	(substituted off) 64'
LF	18	Salma Paralluelo	(substituted off) 84'
Substitutions:
FW	15	Eva Navarro	(substituted on) 64'
MF	16	María Pérez	(substituted on) 64'
MF	7	Irene Guerrero	(substituted on) 77'
FW	11	Alexia Putellas	(substituted on) 77'
FW	22	Athenea del Castillo	(substituted on) 84'
Manager:
Jorge Vilda

Player of the Match:
Aitana Bonmatí (Spain)

Assistant referees:
Michelle O'Neill (Republic of Ireland)
Franca Overtoom (Netherlands)
Fourth official:
Ivana Martinčić (Croatia)
Reserve assistant referee:
Sanja Rođak-Karšić (Croatia)
Video assistant referee:
Marco Fritz (Germany)
Assistant video assistant referee:
Pol van Boekel (Netherlands)
Offside video assistant referee:
Ella De Vries (Belgium)

=== Japan vs Norway ===
5 August 2023
20:00 UTC+12

Japan	3–1	Norway
Syrstad Engen 15' (o.g.); Shimizu 50'; Miyazawa 81'	Report	Reiten 20'

Wellington Regional Stadium, Wellington
Attendance: 33,042
Referee: Edina Alves Batista (Brazil)

Japan	Norway

GK	1	Ayaka Yamashita
CB	12	Hana Takahashi
CB	4	Saki Kumagai (c)
CB	3	Moeka Minami
RM	2	Risa Shimizu
CM	10	Fūka Nagano
CM	14	Yui Hasegawa
LM	13	Jun Endo
RF	15	Aoba Fujino
CF	11	Mina Tanaka	(substituted off) 72'
LF	7	Hinata Miyazawa
Substitutions:
FW	9	Riko Ueki	(substituted on) 72'
Manager:
Futoshi Ikeda

GK	23	Aurora Mikalsen
RB	13	Thea Bjelde	(substituted off) 88'
CB	6	Maren Mjelde (c)
CB	16	Mathilde Harviken
LB	4	Tuva Hansen	(substituted off) 74'
DM	7	Ingrid Syrstad Engen
CM	8	Vilde Bøe Risa	(substituted off) 63'
CM	11	Guro Reiten
RF	10	Caroline Graham Hansen
CF	22	Sophie Román Haug
LF	20	Emilie Haavi	(substituted off) 63'
Substitutions:
MF	18	Frida Maanum	(substituted on) 63'
FW	9	Karina Sævik	(substituted on) 63'
FW	14	Ada Hegerberg	(substituted on) 74'
DF	3	Sara Hørte	(substituted on) 88'
Manager:
Hege Riise

Player of the Match:
Hinata Miyazawa (Japan)

Assistant referees:
Neuza Back (Brazil)
Leila Moreira da Cruz (Brazil)
Fourth official:
Katia García (Mexico)
Reserve assistant referee:
Enedina Caudillo (Mexico)
Video assistant referee:
Daiane Muniz dos Santos (Brazil)
Assistant video assistant referee:
Nicolás Gallo (Colombia)
Offside video assistant referee:
Mariana de Almeida (Argentina)

=== Netherlands vs South Africa ===
6 August 2023
12:00 UTC+10

Netherlands	2–0	South Africa
Roord 9'; Beerensteyn 68'	Report

Sydney Football Stadium, Sydney
Attendance: 40,233
Referee: Yoshimi Yamashita (Japan)

Netherlands	South Africa

GK	1	Daphne van Domselaar
CB	8	Sherida Spitse (c)
CB	3	Stefanie van der Gragt
CB	20	Dominique Janssen
RM	17	Victoria Pelova		(substituted off) 88'
CM	6	Jill Roord		(substituted off) 90+2'
CM	14	Jackie Groenen
CM	10	Daniëlle van de Donk	(yellow card) 67'	(substituted off) 75'
LM	22	Esmee Brugts		(substituted off) 88'
CF	7	Lineth Beerensteyn
CF	11	Lieke Martens		(substituted off) 90+2'
Substitutions:
MF	21	Damaris Egurrola		(substituted on) 75'
DF	2	Lynn Wilms		(substituted on) 88'
MF	18	Kerstin Casparij		(substituted on) 88'
MF	12	Jill Baijings		(substituted on) 90+2'
FW	9	Katja Snoeijs		(substituted on) 90+2'
Manager:
Andries Jonker

GK	1	Kaylin Swart
RB	2	Lebogang Ramalepe
CB	13	Bambanani Mbane	(substituted off) 42'
CB	4	Noko Matlou
LB	7	Karabo Dhlamini
CM	3	Bongeka Gamede
CM	19	Kholosa Biyana
RW	12	Jermaine Seoposenwe	(substituted off) 30'
AM	10	Linda Motlhalo	(substituted off) 90+2'
LW	8	Hildah Magaia	(substituted off) 90+2'
CF	11	Thembi Kgatlana (c)
Substitutions:
FW	23	Wendy Shongwe	(substituted on) 30'
DF	14	Tiisetso Makhubela	(substituted on) 42'
MF	6	Noxolo Cesane	(substituted on) 90+2'
FW	17	Melinda Kgadiete	(substituted on) 90+2'
Manager:
Desiree Ellis

Player of the Match:
Daphne van Domselaar (Netherlands)

Assistant referees:
Makoto Bozono (Japan)
Naomi Teshirogi (Japan)
Fourth official:
Oh Hyeon-jeong (South Korea)
Reserve assistant referee:
Park Mi-suk (South Korea)
Video assistant referee:
Carol Anne Chenard (Canada)
Assistant video assistant referee:
Abdulla Al-Marri (Qatar)
Offside video assistant referee:
Sian Massey-Ellis (England)

=== Sweden vs United States ===
6 August 2023
19:00 UTC+10

Sweden	0–0 (a.e.t.)	United States
	Report
Penalties
Rolfö (penalty scored); Rubensson (penalty scored); Björn (penalty missed); Blomqvist (penalty missed); Bennison (penalty scored); Eriksson (penalty scored); Hurtig (penalty scored)	5–4	(penalty scored) Sullivan; (penalty scored) Horan; (penalty scored) Mewis; (penalty missed) Rapinoe; (penalty missed) Smith; (penalty scored) Naeher; (penalty missed) O'Hara

Melbourne Rectangular Stadium, Melbourne
Attendance: 27,706
Referee: Stéphanie Frappart (France)

Sweden	United States

GK	1	Zećira Mušović
RB	14	Nathalie Björn
CB	13	Amanda Ilestedt
CB	6	Magdalena Eriksson
LB	2	Jonna Andersson
CM	16	Filippa Angeldahl		(substituted off) 97'
CM	23	Elin Rubensson
RW	19	Johanna Rytting Kaneryd		(substituted off) 81'
AM	9	Kosovare Asllani (c)	(yellow card) 49'	(substituted off) 81'
LW	18	Fridolina Rolfö
CF	11	Stina Blackstenius		(substituted off) 112'
Substitutions:
FW	8	Lina Hurtig		(substituted on) 81'
FW	10	Sofia Jakobsson		(substituted on) 81'
MF	20	Hanna Bennison		(substituted on) 97'
FW	15	Rebecka Blomqvist		(substituted on) 112'
Manager:
Peter Gerhardsson

GK	1	Alyssa Naeher
RB	23	Emily Fox		(substituted off) 120'
CB	8	Julie Ertz	(yellow card) 119'
CB	4	Naomi Girma
LB	19	Crystal Dunn
CM	17	Andi Sullivan
CM	14	Emily Sonnett		(substituted off) 120'
RW	20	Trinity Rodman		(substituted off) 66'
AM	10	Lindsey Horan (c)
LW	11	Sophia Smith
CF	13	Alex Morgan		(substituted off) 99'
Substitutions:
FW	6	Lynn Williams		(substituted on) 66'
FW	15	Megan Rapinoe		(substituted on) 99'
MF	22	Kristie Mewis		(substituted on) 120'
DF	5	Kelley O'Hara		(substituted on) 120'
Manager:
(North Macedonia) Vlatko Andonovski

Player of the Match:
Zećira Mušović (Sweden)

Assistant referees:
Manuela Nicolosi (France)
Elodie Coppola (France)
Fourth official:
Casey Reibelt (Australia)
Reserve assistant referee:
Ramina Tsoi (Kyrgyzstan)
Video assistant referee:
Massimiliano Irrati (Italy)
Assistant video assistant referee:
Tatiana Guzmán (Nicaragua)
Offside video assistant referee:
Katrin Rafalski (Germany)

=== England vs Nigeria ===
7 August 2023
17:30 UTC+10

England	0–0 (a.e.t.)	Nigeria
	Report
Penalties
Stanway (penalty missed); England (penalty scored); Daly (penalty scored); Greenwood (penalty scored); Kelly (penalty scored)	4–2	(penalty missed) Oparanozie; (penalty missed) Alozie; (penalty scored) Ajibade; (penalty scored) Ucheibe

Lang Park, Brisbane
Attendance: 49,461
Referee: Melissa Borjas (Honduras)

England	Nigeria

GK	1	Mary Earps
CB	16	Jess Carter
CB	6	Millie Bright (c)
CB	5	Alex Greenwood
RM	2	Lucy Bronze
CM	8	Georgia Stanway
CM	4	Keira Walsh		(substituted off) 120'
LM	9	Rachel Daly
AM	7	Lauren James	(red card) 87'
CF	23	Alessia Russo		(substituted off) 88'
CF	11	Lauren Hemp		(substituted off) 106'
Substitutions:
FW	18	Chloe Kelly		(substituted on) 88'
FW	19	Bethany England		(substituted on) 106'
MF	20	Katie Zelem		(substituted on) 120'
Manager:
(Netherlands) Sarina Wiegman

GK	16	Chiamaka Nnadozie (c)
RB	22	Michelle Alozie
CB	3	Osinachi Ohale
CB	14	Oluwatosin Demehin
LB	2	Ashleigh Plumptre
CM	18	Halimatu Ayinde	(substituted off) 91'
CM	10	Christy Ucheibe
RW	12	Uchenna Kanu	(substituted off) 81'
CM	7	Toni Payne	(substituted off) 114'
LW	15	Rasheedat Ajibade
CF	6	Ifeoma Onumonu	(substituted off) 58'
Substitutions:
FW	8	Asisat Oshoala	(substituted on) 58'
FW	17	Francisca Ordega	(substituted on) 81'
MF	19	Jennifer Echegini	(substituted on) 91'
FW	9	Desire Oparanozie	(substituted on) 114'
Manager:
(United States) Randy Waldrum

Player of the Match:
Mary Earps (England)

Assistant referees:
Shirley Perello (Honduras)
Sandra Ramirez (Mexico)
Fourth official:
Emikar Calderas Barrera (Venezuela)
Reserve assistant referee:
Migdalia Rodríguez Chirino (Venezuela)
Video assistant referee:
Armando Villarreal (United States)
Assistant video assistant referee:
Drew Fischer (Canada)
Offside video assistant referee:
Felisha Mariscal (United States)

=== Australia vs Denmark ===
7 August 2023
20:30 UTC+10

Australia	2–0	Denmark
Foord 29'; Raso 70'	Report

Stadium Australia, Sydney
Attendance: 75,784
Referee: Rebecca Welch (England)

Australia	Denmark

GK	18	Mackenzie Arnold
RB	21	Ellie Carpenter
CB	15	Clare Hunt
CB	14	Alanna Kennedy
LB	7	Steph Catley (c)
RM	16	Hayley Raso	(substituted off) 80'
CM	19	Katrina Gorry
CM	23	Kyra Cooney-Cross
LM	9	Caitlin Foord	(substituted off) 90+5'
CF	10	Emily van Egmond	(substituted off) 80'
CF	11	Mary Fowler	(substituted off) 90+1'
Substitutions:
FW	5	Cortnee Vine	(substituted on) 80'
FW	20	Sam Kerr	(substituted on) 80'
DF	4	Clare Polkinghorne	(substituted on) 90+1'
MF	13	Tameka Yallop	(substituted on) 90+5'
Manager:
(Sweden) Tony Gustavsson

GK	1	Lene Christensen
RB	4	Rikke Sevecke		(substituted off) 63'
CB	3	Stine Ballisager
CB	5	Simone Boye
LB	11	Katrine Veje
RM	19	Janni Thomsen	(yellow card) 67'
CM	6	Karen Holmgaard		(substituted off) 82'
CM	12	Kathrine Møller Kühl		(substituted off) 73'
LM	17	Rikke Madsen		(substituted off) 63'
CF	10	Pernille Harder (c)
CF	9	Amalie Vangsgaard		(substituted off) 82'
Substitutions:
FW	21	Mille Gejl		(substituted on) 63'
FW	20	Signe Bruun		(substituted on) 63'
MF	2	Josefine Hasbo		(substituted on) 73'
MF	8	Emma Snerle		(substituted on) 82'
MF	7	Sanne Troelsgaard		(substituted on) 82'
Manager:
Lars Søndergaard

Player of the Match:
Caitlin Foord (Australia)

Assistant referees:
Natalie Aspinall (England)
Anita Vad (Hungary)
Fourth official:
Marie-Soleil Beaudoin (Canada)
Reserve assistant referee:
Chantal Boudreau (Canada)
Video assistant referee:
Nicolás Gallo (Colombia)
Assistant video assistant referee:
Juan Soto (Venezuela)
Offside video assistant referee:
Mariana de Almeida (Argentina)

=== Colombia vs Jamaica ===
8 August 2023
18:00 UTC+10

Colombia	1–0	Jamaica
Usme 51'	Report

Melbourne Rectangular Stadium, Melbourne
Attendance: 27,706
Referee: Kate Jacewicz (Australia)

Colombia	Jamaica

GK	1	Catalina Pérez
RB	17	Carolina Arias
CB	19	Jorelyn Carabalí
CB	3	Daniela Arias	(yellow card) 70'
LB	15	Ana María Guzmán
DM	4	Diana Ospina
CM	10	Leicy Santos		(substituted off) 87'
CM	5	Lorena Bedoya
RF	9	Mayra Ramírez
CF	11	Catalina Usme (c)		(substituted off) 90+3'
LF	18	Linda Caicedo
Substitutions:
MF	6	Daniela Montoya		(substituted on) 87'
MF	8	Marcela Restrepo		(substituted on) 90+3'
Manager:
Nelson Abadía

GK	13	Rebecca Spencer
RB	19	Tiernny Wiltshire		(substituted off) 83'
CB	17	Allyson Swaby
CB	4	Chantelle Swaby	(yellow card) 41'
LB	14	Deneisha Blackwood
CM	8	Drew Spence	(yellow card) 45+1'
CM	3	Vyan Sampson		(substituted off) 79'
RW	12	Kiki Van Zanten		(substituted off) 46'
AM	10	Jody Brown		(substituted off) 83'
LW	18	Trudi Carter		(substituted off) 67'
CF	11	Khadija Shaw (c)
Substitutions:
MF	20	Atlanta Primus		(substituted on) 46'
FW	15	Tiffany Cameron		(substituted on) 67'
MF	7	Peyton McNamara		(substituted on) 79'
FW	9	Kameron Simmonds		(substituted on) 83'
MF	21	Cheyna Matthews		(substituted on) 83'
Manager:
Lorne Donaldson

Player of the Match:
Catalina Usme (Colombia)

Assistant referees:
Kim Kyoung-min (South Korea)
Joanna Charaktis (Australia)
Fourth official:
Marta Huerta de Aza (Spain)
Reserve assistant referee:
Diana Chikotesha (Zambia)
Video assistant referee:
Pol van Boekel (Netherlands)
Assistant video assistant referee:
Marco Fritz (Germany)
Offside video assistant referee:
Ella De Vries (Belgium)

=== France vs Morocco ===
8 August 2023
20:30 UTC+9:30

France	4–0	Morocco
Diani 15'; Dali 20'; Le Sommer 23', 70'	Report

Hindmarsh Stadium, Adelaide
Attendance: 13,557
Referee: Tori Penso (United States)

France	Morocco

GK	16	Pauline Peyraud-Magnin
RB	22	Ève Périsset	(substituted off) 81'
CB	3	Wendie Renard (c)
CB	5	Élisa De Almeida
LB	7	Sakina Karchaoui	(substituted off) 90+1'
RM	15	Kenza Dali
CM	8	Grace Geyoro
CM	6	Sandie Toletti	(substituted off) 64'
LM	13	Selma Bacha
AM	9	Eugénie Le Sommer	(substituted off) 81'
CF	11	Kadidiatou Diani	(substituted off) 90+1'
Substitutions:
FW	23	Vicki Bècho	(substituted on) 64'
FW	19	Naomie Feller	(substituted on) 81'
DF	20	Estelle Cascarino	(substituted on) 81'
FW	18	Viviane Asseyi	(substituted on) 90+1'
DF	14	Aïssatou Tounkara	(substituted on) 90+1'
Manager:
Hervé Renard

GK	1	Khadija Er-Rmichi
RB	17	Hanane Aït El Haj	(yellow card) 57'
CB	5	Nesryne El Chad
CB	3	Nouhaila Benzina
LB	2	Zineb Redouani
RM	19	Sakina Ouzraoui Diki
CM	6	Élodie Nakkach		(substituted off) 64'
CM	7	Ghizlane Chebbak (c)
LM	11	Fatima Tagnaout		(substituted off) 64'
CF	16	Anissa Lahmari		(substituted off) 64'
CF	9	Ibtissam Jraïdi
Substitutions:
MF	4	Sarah Kassi		(substituted on) 64'
FW	23	Rosella Ayane		(substituted on) 64'
FW	20	Sofia Bouftini		(substituted on) 64'
Manager:
(France) Reynald Pedros

Player of the Match:
Kadidiatou Diani (France)

Assistant referees:
Brooke Mayo (United States)
Mijensa Rensch (Suriname)
Fourth official:
Anna-Marie Keighley (New Zealand)
Reserve assistant referee:
Sarah Jones (New Zealand)
Video assistant referee:
Alejandro Hernández Hernández (Spain)
Assistant video assistant referee:
Muhammad Taqi (Singapore)
Offside video assistant referee:
Sian Massey-Ellis (England)

== Quarter-finals ==
=== Spain vs Netherlands ===
11 August 2023
13:00 UTC+12

Spain	2–1 (a.e.t.)	Netherlands
Caldentey 81' (pen.); Paralluelo 111'	Report	Van der Gragt 90+1'

Wellington Regional Stadium, Wellington
Attendance: 32,021
Referee: Stéphanie Frappart (France)

Spain	Netherlands

GK	23	Cata Coll
RB	12	Oihane Hernández	(yellow card) 35'	(substituted off) 91'
CB	4	Irene Paredes
CB	14	Laia Codina		(substituted off) 77'
LB	2	Ona Batlle
DM	3	Teresa Abelleira
CM	6	Aitana Bonmatí		(substituted off) 87'
CM	10	Jennifer Hermoso
RF	17	Alba Redondo		(substituted off) 71'
CF	9	Esther González (c)		(substituted off) 100'
LF	8	Mariona Caldentey		(substituted off) 100'
Substitutions:
FW	18	Salma Paralluelo		(substituted on) 71'
DF	5	Ivana Andrés		(substituted on) 77'
MF	7	Irene Guerrero		(substituted on) 87'
DF	19	Olga Carmona		(substituted on) 91'
FW	15	Eva Navarro		(substituted on) 100'
FW	11	Alexia Putellas		(substituted on) 100'
Manager:
Jorge Vilda

GK	1	Daphne van Domselaar
CB	8	Sherida Spitse (c)		(substituted off) 85'
CB	3	Stefanie van der Gragt		(substituted off) 106'
CB	20	Dominique Janssen
RM	17	Victoria Pelova
CM	6	Jill Roord		(substituted off) 61'
CM	21	Damaris Egurrola	(yellow card) 61'	(substituted off) 96'
CM	14	Jackie Groenen
LM	22	Esmee Brugts		(substituted off) 89'
CF	7	Lineth Beerensteyn
CF	11	Lieke Martens
Substitutions:
DF	2	Lynn Wilms		(substituted on) 61'
FW	9	Katja Snoeijs		(substituted on) 85'
DF	4	Aniek Nouwen		(substituted on) 89'
DF	15	Caitlin Dijkstra		(substituted on) 96'
MF	18	Kerstin Casparij		(substituted on) 106'
Manager:
Andries Jonker

Player of the Match:
Salma Paralluelo (Spain)

Assistant referees:
Manuela Nicolosi (France)
Elodie Coppola (France)
Fourth official:
Maria Sole Ferrieri Caputi (Italy)
Reserve assistant referee:
Francesca Di Monte (Italy)
Video assistant referee:
Tatiana Guzmán (Nicaragua)
Assistant video assistant referee:
Marco Fritz (Germany)
Offside video assistant referee:
Ella De Vries (Belgium)
Stand-by video assistant referee:
Abdulla Al-Marri (Qatar)
Stand-by assistant video assistant referee:
Adil Zourak (Morocco)

=== Japan vs Sweden ===
11 August 2023
19:30 UTC+12

Japan	1–2	Sweden
Hayashi 87'	Report	Ilestedt 32'; Angeldahl 51' (pen.)

Eden Park, Auckland
Attendance: 43,217
Referee: Esther Staubli (Switzerland)

Japan	Sweden

GK	1	Ayaka Yamashita
CB	12	Hana Takahashi		(substituted off) 90+2'
CB	4	Saki Kumagai (c)
CB	3	Moeka Minami
RM	2	Risa Shimizu
CM	14	Yui Hasegawa
CM	10	Fūka Nagano		(substituted off) 80'
LM	6	Hina Sugita		(substituted off) 46'
RF	15	Aoba Fujino
CF	11	Mina Tanaka		(substituted off) 52'
LF	7	Hinata Miyazawa		(substituted off) 80'
Substitutions:
MF	13	Jun Endo		(substituted on) 46'
FW	9	Riko Ueki	(yellow card) 79'	(substituted on) 52'
MF	16	Honoka Hayashi		(substituted on) 80'
DF	17	Kiko Seike		(substituted on) 80'
FW	20	Maika Hamano		(substituted on) 90+2'
Manager:
Futoshi Ikeda

GK	1	Zećira Mušović
RB	14	Nathalie Björn
CB	13	Amanda Ilestedt
CB	6	Magdalena Eriksson
LB	2	Jonna Andersson
CM	16	Filippa Angeldahl
CM	23	Elin Rubensson	(substituted off) 84'
RW	19	Johanna Rytting Kaneryd	(substituted off) 84'
AM	9	Kosovare Asllani (c)	(substituted off) 73'
LW	18	Fridolina Rolfö	(substituted off) 73'
CF	11	Stina Blackstenius
Substitutions:
FW	7	Madelen Janogy	(substituted on) 73'
FW	8	Lina Hurtig	(substituted on) 73'
FW	10	Sofia Jakobsson	(substituted on) 84'
MF	20	Hanna Bennison	(substituted on) 84'
Manager:
Peter Gerhardsson

Player of the Match:
Amanda Ilestedt (Sweden)

Assistant referees:
Katrin Rafalski (Germany)
Susanne Küng (Switzerland)
Fourth official:
Katia García (Mexico)
Reserve assistant referee:
Karen Diaz Medina (Mexico)
Video assistant referee:
Massimiliano Irrati (Italy)
Assistant video assistant referee:
Drew Fischer (Canada)
Offside video assistant referee:
Neuza Back (Brazil)
Stand-by video assistant referee:
Salomé di Iorio (Argentina)
Stand-by assistant video assistant referee:
Daiane Muniz dos Santos (Brazil)

=== Australia vs France ===
12 August 2023
17:00 UTC+10

Australia	0–0 (a.e.t.)	France
	Report
Penalties
Foord (penalty scored); Catley (penalty missed); Kerr (penalty scored); Fowler (penalty scored); Arnold (penalty missed); Gorry (penalty scored); Yallop (penalty scored); Carpenter (penalty scored); Hunt (penalty missed); Vine (penalty scored)	7–6	(penalty missed) Bacha; (penalty scored) Diani; (penalty scored) Renard; (penalty scored) Le Sommer; (penalty missed) Périsset; (penalty scored) Geyoro; (penalty scored) Karchaoui; (penalty scored) Lakrar; (penalty missed) Dali; (penalty missed) Bècho

Lang Park, Brisbane
Attendance: 49,461
Referee: María Carvajal (Chile)

Australia	France

GK	18	Mackenzie Arnold
RB	21	Ellie Carpenter
CB	15	Clare Hunt
CB	14	Alanna Kennedy
LB	7	Steph Catley (c)
RM	16	Hayley Raso		(substituted off) 104'
CM	19	Katrina Gorry	(yellow card) 92'
CM	23	Kyra Cooney-Cross		(substituted off) 116'
LM	9	Caitlin Foord
CF	10	Emily van Egmond		(substituted off) 55'
CF	11	Mary Fowler
Substitutions:
FW	20	Sam Kerr		(substituted on) 55'
FW	5	Cortnee Vine		(substituted on) 104'
MF	13	Tameka Yallop		(substituted on) 116'
Manager:
(Sweden) Tony Gustavsson

GK	16	Pauline Peyraud-Magnin	(substituted off) 120+3'
RB	5	Élisa De Almeida	(substituted off) 120+3'
CB	2	Maëlle Lakrar
CB	3	Wendie Renard (c)
LB	7	Sakina Karchaoui
RM	15	Kenza Dali
CM	8	Grace Geyoro
CM	6	Sandie Toletti	(substituted off) 64'
LM	13	Selma Bacha
AM	9	Eugénie Le Sommer
CF	11	Kadidiatou Diani
Substitutions:
FW	23	Vicki Bècho	(substituted on) 64'
DF	22	Ève Périsset	(substituted on) 120+3'
GK	1	Solène Durand	(substituted on) 120+3'
Manager:
Hervé Renard

Player of the Match:
Mackenzie Arnold (Australia)

Assistant referees:
Leslie Vásquez (Chile)
Mónica Amboya (Ecuador)
Fourth official:
Laura Fortunato (Argentina)
Reserve assistant referee:
Daiana Milone (Argentina)
Video assistant referee:
Nicolás Gallo (Colombia)
Assistant video assistant referee:
Juan Soto (Venezuela)
Offside video assistant referee:
Mariana de Almeida (Argentina)
Stand-by video assistant referee:
Juan Martínez Munuera (Spain)
Stand-by assistant video assistant referee:
Alejandro Hernández Hernández (Spain)

=== England vs Colombia ===
12 August 2023
20:30 UTC+10

England	2–1	Colombia
Hemp 45+7'; Russo 63'	Report	Santos 44'

Stadium Australia, Sydney
Attendance: 75,784
Referee: Ekaterina Koroleva (United States)

England	Colombia

GK	1	Mary Earps
CB	16	Jess Carter
CB	6	Millie Bright (c)
CB	5	Alex Greenwood
RM	2	Lucy Bronze
CM	8	Georgia Stanway
CM	4	Keira Walsh
CM	10	Ella Toone
LM	9	Rachel Daly
CF	23	Alessia Russo	(substituted off) 84'
CF	11	Lauren Hemp	(substituted off) 90+3'
Substitutions:
FW	18	Chloe Kelly	(substituted on) 84'
FW	19	Bethany England	(substituted on) 90+3'
Manager:
(Netherlands) Sarina Wiegman

GK	1	Catalina Pérez	(substituted off) 67'
RB	17	Carolina Arias	(substituted off) 10'
CB	19	Jorelyn Carabalí
CB	3	Daniela Arias
LB	2	Manuela Vanegas
CM	4	Diana Ospina	(substituted off) 78'
CM	5	Lorena Bedoya
RW	11	Catalina Usme (c)
AM	10	Leicy Santos
LW	18	Linda Caicedo
CF	9	Mayra Ramírez
Substitutions:
DF	15	Ana María Guzmán	(substituted on) 10'
GK	13	Natalia Giraldo	(substituted on) 67'
FW	21	Ivonne Chacón	(substituted on) 78'
Manager:
Nelson Abadía

Player of the Match:
Alessia Russo (England)

Assistant referees:
Kathryn Nesbitt (United States)
Felisha Mariscal (United States)
Fourth official:
Oh Hyeon-jeong (South Korea)
Reserve assistant referee:
Ramina Tsoi (Kyrgyzstan)
Video assistant referee:
Carol Anne Chenard (Canada)
Assistant video assistant referee:
Armando Villarreal (United States)
Offside video assistant referee:
Chantal Boudreau (Canada)
Stand-by video assistant referee:
Muhammad Taqi (Singapore)
Stand-by assistant video assistant referee:
Pol van Boekel (Netherlands)

== Semi-finals ==
=== Spain vs Sweden ===
15 August 2023
20:00 UTC+12

Spain	2–1	Sweden
Paralluelo 81'; Carmona 89'	Report	Blomqvist 88'

Eden Park, Auckland
Attendance: 43,217
Referee: Edina Alves Batista (Brazil)

Spain	Sweden

GK	23	Cata Coll
RB	2	Ona Batlle
CB	4	Irene Paredes
CB	14	Laia Codina
LB	19	Olga Carmona (c)
DM	3	Teresa Abelleira
CM	6	Aitana Bonmatí
CM	11	Alexia Putellas	(substituted off) 57'
RF	17	Alba Redondo	(substituted off) 73'
CF	10	Jennifer Hermoso
LF	8	Mariona Caldentey	(substituted off) 90+5'
Substitutions:
FW	18	Salma Paralluelo	(substituted on) 57'
FW	15	Eva Navarro	(substituted on) 73'
FW	9	Esther González	(substituted on) 90+5'
Manager:
Jorge Vilda

GK	1	Zećira Mušović
RB	14	Nathalie Björn
CB	13	Amanda Ilestedt
CB	6	Magdalena Eriksson
LB	2	Jonna Andersson
CM	16	Filippa Angeldahl
CM	23	Elin Rubensson	(substituted off) 87'
RW	19	Johanna Rytting Kaneryd	(substituted off) 77'
AM	9	Kosovare Asllani (c)
LW	18	Fridolina Rolfö
CF	11	Stina Blackstenius	(substituted off) 77'
Substitutions:
MF	22	Olivia Schough	(substituted on) 77'
FW	15	Rebecka Blomqvist	(substituted on) 77'
FW	8	Lina Hurtig	(substituted on) 87'
Manager:
Peter Gerhardsson

Player of the Match:
Salma Paralluelo (Spain)

Assistant referees:
Neuza Back (Brazil)
Leila Moreira da Cruz (Brazil)
Fourth official:
Melissa Borjas (Honduras)
Reserve assistant referee:
Sandra Ramirez (Mexico)
Video assistant referee:
Nicolás Gallo (Colombia)
Assistant video assistant referee:
Armando Villarreal (United States)
Offside video assistant referee:
Felisha Mariscal (United States)
Support video assistant referee:
Juan Soto (Venezuela)
Stand-by video assistant referee:
Adil Zourak (Morocco)
Stand-by assistant video assistant referee:
Muhammad Taqi (Singapore)

=== Australia vs England ===
16 August 2023
20:00 UTC+10

Australia	1–3	England
Kerr 63'	Report	Toone 36'; Hemp 71'; Russo 86'

Stadium Australia, Sydney
Attendance: 75,784
Referee: Tori Penso (United States)

Australia	England

GK	18	Mackenzie Arnold
RB	21	Ellie Carpenter
CB	15	Clare Hunt
CB	4	Clare Polkinghorne	(substituted off) 81'
LB	7	Steph Catley
RM	16	Hayley Raso	(substituted off) 72'
CM	19	Katrina Gorry	(substituted off) 88'
CM	23	Kyra Cooney-Cross
LM	9	Caitlin Foord
CF	11	Mary Fowler
CF	20	Sam Kerr (c)
Substitutions:
FW	5	Cortnee Vine	(substituted on) 72'
FW	10	Emily van Egmond	(substituted on) 81'
MF	8	Alex Chidiac	(substituted on) 88'
Manager:
(Sweden) Tony Gustavsson

GK	1	Mary Earps
CB	16	Jess Carter
CB	6	Millie Bright (c)
CB	5	Alex Greenwood	(yellow card) 10'
RM	2	Lucy Bronze
CM	8	Georgia Stanway
CM	4	Keira Walsh
CM	10	Ella Toone		(substituted off) 90'
LM	9	Rachel Daly
CF	23	Alessia Russo		(substituted off) 87'
CF	11	Lauren Hemp
Substitutions:
FW	18	Chloe Kelly	(yellow card) 90+5'	(substituted on) 87'
DF	3	Niamh Charles		(substituted on) 90'
Manager:
(Netherlands) Sarina Wiegman

Player of the Match:
Lauren Hemp (England)

Assistant referees:
Brooke Mayo (United States)
Mijensa Rensch (Suriname)
Fourth official:
Tess Olofsson (Sweden)
Reserve assistant referee:
Lucie Ratajová (Czech Republic)
Video assistant referee:
Massimiliano Irrati (Italy)
Assistant video assistant referee:
Carol Anne Chenard (Canada)
Offside video assistant referee:
Kathryn Nesbitt (United States)
Support video assistant referee:
Drew Fischer (Canada)

== Third place play-off ==
19 August 2023
18:00 UTC+10

Sweden	2–0	Australia
Rolfö 30' (pen.); Asllani 62'	Report

Lang Park, Brisbane
Attendance: 49,461
Referee: Cheryl Foster (Wales)

Sweden	Australia

GK	1	Zećira Mušović
RB	14	Nathalie Björn
CB	13	Amanda Ilestedt
CB	6	Magdalena Eriksson
LB	2	Jonna Andersson
CM	16	Filippa Angeldahl
CM	23	Elin Rubensson	(yellow card) 89'
RW	19	Johanna Rytting Kaneryd		(substituted off) 89'
AM	9	Kosovare Asllani (c)		(substituted off) 67'
LW	18	Fridolina Rolfö
CF	11	Stina Blackstenius		(substituted off) 67'
Substitutions:
FW	8	Lina Hurtig	(yellow card) 90+4'	(substituted on) 67'
FW	15	Rebecka Blomqvist		(substituted on) 67'
DF	3	Linda Sembrant		(substituted on) 89'
Manager:
Peter Gerhardsson

GK	18	Mackenzie Arnold
RB	21	Ellie Carpenter		(substituted off) 74'
CB	15	Clare Hunt
CB	4	Clare Polkinghorne		(substituted off) 74'
LB	7	Steph Catley
RM	16	Hayley Raso		(substituted off) 60'
CM	19	Katrina Gorry	(yellow card) 45+1'	(substituted off) 60'
CM	23	Kyra Cooney-Cross
LM	9	Caitlin Foord
CF	11	Mary Fowler
CF	20	Sam Kerr (c)
Substitutions:
FW	10	Emily van Egmond		(substituted on) 60'
FW	5	Cortnee Vine		(substituted on) 60'
MF	8	Alex Chidiac		(substituted on) 74'
DF	2	Courtney Nevin		(substituted on) 74'
Manager:
(Sweden) Tony Gustavsson

Player of the Match:
Fridolina Rolfö (Sweden)

Assistant referees:
Michelle O'Neill (Republic of Ireland)
Franca Overtoom (Netherlands)
Fourth official:
Rebecca Welch (England)
Reserve assistant referee:
Natalie Aspinall (England)
Video assistant referee:
Marco Fritz (Germany)
Assistant video assistant referee:
Alejandro Hernández Hernández (Spain)
Offside video assistant referee:
Sian Massey-Ellis (England)
Support video assistant referee:
Massimiliano Irrati (Italy)

== Final ==
20 August 2023
20:00 UTC+10

Spain	1–0	England
Carmona 29'	Report

Stadium Australia, Sydney
Attendance: 75,784
Referee: Tori Penso (United States)

Spain	England

GK	23	Cata Coll
RB	2	Ona Batlle
CB	4	Irene Paredes
CB	14	Laia Codina		(substituted off) 73'
LB	19	Olga Carmona (c)
DM	3	Teresa Abelleira
CM	6	Aitana Bonmatí
CM	10	Jennifer Hermoso
RF	17	Alba Redondo		(substituted off) 60'
CF	18	Salma Paralluelo	(yellow card) 78'
LF	8	Mariona Caldentey		(substituted off) 90'
Substitutions:
DF	12	Oihane Hernández		(substituted on) 60'
DF	5	Ivana Andrés		(substituted on) 73'
FW	11	Alexia Putellas		(substituted on) 90'
Manager:
Jorge Vilda

GK	1	Mary Earps
CB	16	Jess Carter
CB	6	Millie Bright (c)
CB	5	Alex Greenwood
RM	2	Lucy Bronze
CM	8	Georgia Stanway
CM	4	Keira Walsh
CM	10	Ella Toone		(substituted off) 87'
LM	9	Rachel Daly		(substituted off) 46'
CF	23	Alessia Russo		(substituted off) 46'
CF	11	Lauren Hemp	(yellow card) 55'
Substitutions:
FW	7	Lauren James		(substituted on) 46'
FW	18	Chloe Kelly		(substituted on) 46'
FW	19	Bethany England		(substituted on) 87'
Manager:
(Netherlands) Sarina Wiegman

Player of the Match:
Olga Carmona (Spain)

Assistant referees:
Brooke Mayo (United States)
Kathryn Nesbitt (United States)
Fourth official:
Yoshimi Yamashita (Japan)
Reserve assistant referee:
Mijensa Rensch (Suriname)
Video assistant referee:
Tatiana Guzmán (Nicaragua)
Assistant video assistant referee:
Pol van Boekel (Netherlands)
Offside video assistant referee:
Ella De Vries (Belgium)
Support video assistant referee:
Armando Villarreal (United States)
