= Morocco at the FIFA Women's World Cup =

FIFA Women's World Cup

The Morocco women's national football team has qualified to the FIFA Women's World Cup in two occasion, the 2023 which was the country's debut also the upcoming 2027. Morocco is also the first country from the Arab world to do so since the inception of the FIFA Women's World Cup in 1991.

== FIFA Women's World Cup results ==
FIFA Women's World Cup record
Appearances: 1 / 9
Year	Result	GP	W	D*	L	GF	GA	GD
(China) 1991	Did not enter							
(Sweden) 1995	Did not enter							
(United States) 1999	Did not qualify							
(United States) 2003	Did not qualify							
(China) 2007	Did not qualify							
(Germany) 2011	Did not qualify							
(Canada) 2015	Did not qualify							
(France) 2019	Did not qualify							
(Australia) (New Zealand) 2023	Round of 16	4	2	0	2	2	10	–8
(Brazil) 2027	Qualified							
(Costa Rica) (Jamaica) (Mexico) (United States) 2031	To be determined							
(United Kingdom) 2035	To be determined							
Total	1/12	4	2	0	2	2	10	–8

*Draws include knockout matches decided on penalty kicks.

== Participation ==
=== 2023 Women's World Cup ===
==== Group H ====
Pos	Team	Pld	W	D	L	GF	GA	GD	Pts	Qualification
1	Colombia	3	2	0	1	4	2	+2	6	Advance to knockout stage
2	Morocco	3	2	0	1	2	6	−4	6	Advance to knockout stage
3	Germany	3	1	1	1	8	3	+5	4	
4	South Korea	3	0	1	2	1	4	−3	1	

Source: FIFA
Rules for classification: Group stage tiebreakers
24 July 2023
18:30 UTC+10

Germany	6–0	Morocco
Popp 11', 39'; Bühl 46'; Aït El Haj 54' (o.g.); Redouani 79' (o.g.); Schüller 90'	Report

Melbourne Rectangular Stadium, Melbourne
Attendance: 27,256
Referee: Tori Penso (United States)

30 July 2023
14:00 UTC+9:30

South Korea	0–1	Morocco
	Report	Jraïdi 6'

Hindmarsh Stadium, Adelaide
Attendance: 12,886
Referee: Edina Alves Batista (Brazil)

3 August 2023
18:00 UTC+8

Morocco	1–0	Colombia
Lahmari 45+4'	Report

Perth Rectangular Stadium, Perth
Attendance: 17,342
Referee: Maria Sole Ferrieri Caputi (Italy)

==== Round of 16 ====
8 August 2023
20:30 UTC+9:30

France	4–0	Morocco
Diani 15'; Dali 20'; Le Sommer 23', 70'	Report

Hindmarsh Stadium, Adelaide
Attendance: 13,557
Referee: Tori Penso (United States)

== Head-to-head record ==
Opponent	Pld	W	D	L	GF	GA	GD	Win %
Colombia	1	1	0	0	1	0	+1	100.00
France	1	0	0	1	0	4	−4	0.00
Germany	1	0	0	1	0	6	−6	0.00
South Korea	1	1	0	0	1	0	+1	100.00
Total	4	2	0	2	2	10	−8	50.00

== Goalscorers ==
Player	Goals	2023
Ibtissam Jraïdi	1	1
Anissa Lahmari	1	1
Total	2	2

Own goals scored for opponents

- Hanane Aït El Haj (scored for Germany in 2023)
- Zineb Redouani (scored for Germany in 2023)
