= 2025 CAF Women's Champions League =

5th CAF Women's Champions League edition

Tournament details
- Host country: Egypt
- Cities: Cairo; Ismailia
- Dates: Qualification: 3 August–29 September 2025; Main tournament: 8–21 November 2025
- Teams: Main tournament: 8 Total: 40 (from 40 associations)

Final positions
- Champions: (Morocco) AS FAR (2nd title)
- Runners-up: (Ivory Coast) ASEC Mimosas
- Third place: (Democratic Republic of the Congo) TP Mazembe
- Fourth place: (Egypt) FC Masar

Tournament statistics
- Matches played: 16
- Goals scored: 37 (2.31 per match)
- Top scorer: (Democratic Republic of the Congo) Marlène Kasaj (5 goals)
- Best player: (Ivory Coast) Habibou Ouédraogo
- Best goalkeeper: (Morocco) Khadija Er-Rmichi
- Fair play award: (Egypt) FC Masar

The 2025 CAF Women's Champions League was the fifth edition of the annual African premier women's association football club tournament organized by the Confederation of African Football. The tournament was hosted by Egypt from 8 to 21 November 2025. AS FAR defeated ASEC Mimosas 2-1 in the final, claiming their second CAF Women's Champions League title. Following their win, AS FAR qualified for the inaugural FIFA Women's Champions Cup to be held in 2026.

== Qualified teams ==
Location of teams of the 2025 CAF Women's Champions League group stage.
Group A
Group B

Association	Team	Qualifying method	Appearance
Egypt	FC Masar (hosts)	2024–25 Egyptian Women's Premier League champions	2nd
DR Congo	TP Mazembe (holders)	2024 CAF Women's Champions League winners	3rd
Morocco	AS FAR	2025 CAF Women's Champions League UNAF Qualifiers champions	5th
Mali	USFAS Bamako	2025 CAF Women's Champions League WAFU Zone A Qualifiers champions	1st
Ivory Coast	ASEC Mimosas	2025 CAF Women's Champions League WAFU Zone B Qualifiers champions	1st
Equatorial Guinea	FC 15 de Agosto	2025 CAF Women's Champions League UNIFFAC Qualifiers champions	1st
Tanzania	JKT Queens	2025 CAF Women's Champions League CECAFA Qualifiers champions	2nd
Botswana	Gaborone United	2025 CAF Women's Champions League COSAFA Qualifiers champions	1st

== Venues ==
2025 CAF Women's Champions League (Egypt)	October Gardens	Ismailia
2025 CAF Women's Champions League (Egypt)	Right to Dream Stadium	Suez Canal Stadium
2025 CAF Women's Champions League (Egypt)	Capacity: 10,000	Capacity: 22,000

== Group stage ==
=== Tiebreakers ===
Teams were ranked according to points (3 points for a win, 1 point for a draw, 0 points for a loss).

If two teams were tied on points, the following tiebreaking criteria were applied, in the order given, to determine the rankings (Regulations Article 71):

1. Points in head-to-head matches match between the two tied teams;
2. Goal difference in all group matches;
3. Goals scored in all group matches;
4. Drawing of lots.

If more than two teams were tied, the following criteria were applied instead:

1. Points in matches between the tied teams;
2. Goal difference in matches between the tied teams;
3. Goals scored in matches between the tied teams;
4. If after applying all criteria above, two teams were still tied, the above criteria were again applied to matches played between the two teams in question. If this did not resolve the tie, the next three criteria were applied;
5. Goal difference in all group matches;
6. Goals scored in all group matches;
7. Drawing of lots.

=== Group A ===
Pos	Team	Pld	W	D	L	GF	GA	GD	Pts	Qualification
1	(Morocco) AS FAR	3	2	1	0	4	0	+4	7	Advance to knockout stage
2	(Egypt) FC Masar (H)	3	1	2	0	6	1	+5	5	Advance to knockout stage
3	(Mali) USFAS Bamako	3	1	1	1	3	4	−1	4	
4	(Equatorial Guinea) FC 15 de Agosto	3	0	0	3	1	9	−8	0	

Source: Flashscore
(H) Hosts
8 November 2025
15:00

FC 15 de Agosto (Equatorial Guinea)	1–2	(Mali) USFAS Bamako
Nchama 42'	Report	M. Traoré 69' (pen.); A. Diarra 82'

Right to Dream Stadium, October Gardens
Attendance: 64
Referee: Vincentia Amédomé (Togo)
8 November 2025
18:00

FC Masar (Egypt)	0–0	(Morocco) AS FAR
	Report

Suez Canal Stadium, Ismailia
Attendance: 1,100
Referee: Akhona Makalima (South Africa)

11 November 2025
15:00

FC Masar (Egypt)	5–0	(Equatorial Guinea) FC 15 de Agosto
Yasmin Mohamed 41', 86'; Ogebe 56'; Ubamba 72'; Hala Moustafa 90+6'	Report

Right to Dream Stadium, October Gardens
Attendance: 500
Referee: Antsino Twanyanyukwa (Namibia)
11 November 2025
18:00

USFAS Bamako (Mali)	0–2	(Morocco) AS FAR
	Report	Redouani 45' (pen.); Banouk 90'

Right to Dream Stadium, October Gardens
Attendance: 60
Referee: Natacha Konan (Ivory Coast)

15 November 2025
15:00

USFAS Bamako (Mali)	1–1	(Egypt) FC Masar
Koné 10'	Report	Farah Hisham 90+5'

Right to Dream Stadium, October Gardens
Referee: Aline Umutoni (Rwanda)
15 November 2025
15:00

AS FAR (Morocco)	2–0	(Equatorial Guinea) FC 15 de Agosto
Badri 45+1' (pen.); Banouk 66'	Report

Suez Canal Stadium, Ismailia
Referee: Joyce Seonyatseng (Botswana)

=== Group B ===
Pos	Team	Pld	W	D	L	GF	GA	GD	Pts	Qualification
1	(Ivory Coast) ASEC Mimosas	3	2	1	0	6	1	+5	7	Advance to knockout stage
2	(Democratic Republic of the Congo) TP Mazembe	3	2	0	1	7	2	+5	6	Advance to knockout stage
3	(Tanzania) JKT Queens	3	0	2	1	2	5	−3	2	
4	(Botswana) Gaborone United	3	0	1	2	0	7	−7	1	

Source: Flashscore
9 November 2025
15:00

TP Mazembe (Democratic Republic of the Congo)	0–1	(Ivory Coast) ASEC Mimosas
	Report	Ouédraogo 66'

Suez Canal Stadium, Ismailia
Referee: Shahenda El Maghrabi (Egypt)
9 November 2025
18:00

Gaborone United (Botswana)	0–0	(Tanzania) JKT Queens
	Report

Suez Canal Stadium, Ismailia
Referee: Aline Guimbang Etong (Cameroon)

12 November 2025
15:00

TP Mazembe (Democratic Republic of the Congo)	3–0	(Botswana) Gaborone United
Mohlakoana 32'; Kasaj Yav 61' (pen.); Obono 90+6'	Report

Suez Canal Stadium, Ismailia
Attendance: 75
Referee: Shamirah Nabadda (Uganda)
12 November 2025
18:00

JKT Queens (Tanzania)	1–1	(Ivory Coast) ASEC Mimosas
Maseke 8'	Report	Gnounoué 82' (pen.)

Suez Canal Stadium, Ismailia
Attendance: 70
Referee: Aissatou Kanté (Guinea)

15 November 2025
18:00

JKT Queens (Tanzania)	1–4	(Democratic Republic of the Congo) TP Mazembe
Athumani 12'	Report	Kasaj Yav 23' (pen.), 66' (pen.); Samuel 29'; Acheampong 45+3'

Suez Canal Stadium, Ismailia
Referee: Sabah Sadir (Morocco)
15 November 2025
18:00

ASEC Mimosas (Ivory Coast)	4–0	(Botswana) Gaborone United
Diallo 30', 48'; Ouédraogo 84', 90+1'	Report

Right to Dream Stadium, October Gardens
Referee: Suavis Iratunga (Burundi)

== Knockout phase ==
Semi-finals
18 November – Ismailia
(Morocco) AS FAR (p)	0 (4)
(Democratic Republic of the Congo) TP Mazembe	0 (2)
18 November – Ismailia
(Ivory Coast) ASEC Mimosas	1
(Egypt) FC Masar	0

Final
21 November – Ismailia
(Morocco) AS FAR	2
(Ivory Coast) ASEC Mimosas	1
Third place
21 November – Ismailia
(Democratic Republic of the Congo) TP Mazembe	3
(Egypt) FC Masar	1

=== Semi-finals ===
18 November 2025
15:00

AS FAR (Morocco)	0–0 (a.e.t.)	(Democratic Republic of the Congo) TP Mazembe
	Report
Penalties
Redouani (penalty scored); Aït El Haj (penalty scored); El Madani (penalty missed); Benzina (penalty scored); Erroudany (penalty scored)	4–2	(penalty missed) Kasaj Yav; (penalty missed) Obono; (penalty scored) Msipa; (penalty scored) Baffour

Suez Canal Stadium, Ismailia
Attendance: 70
Referee: Vincentia Amédomé (Togo)

18 November 2025
19:00

ASEC Mimosas (Ivory Coast)	1–0	(Egypt) FC Masar
Dagba 73'	Report

Suez Canal Stadium, Ismailia
Attendance: 350
Referee: Antsino Twanyanyukwa (Namibia)

=== Third-place match ===
21 November 2025
15:00

TP Mazembe (Democratic Republic of the Congo)	3–1	(Egypt) FC Masar
Adesina 17'; Kasaj Yav 41' (pen.), 45+2'	Report	Ubamba 20'

Suez Canal Stadium, Ismailia
Referee: Akhona Makalima (South Africa)

=== Final ===
21 November 2025
19:00

AS FAR (Morocco)	2–1	(Ivory Coast) ASEC Mimosas
Ait El Haj 13' (pen.); Redouani 85' (pen.)	Report	Diallo 55'

Suez Canal Stadium, Ismailia
Attendance: 150
Referee: Aline Guimbang Etong (Cameroon)

== Statistics ==
=== Top scorers ===
Statistics as of 21 November 2025 (after 16 matches, 40 total goals)

Rank	Player	Team	Goals
1	(Democratic Republic of the Congo) Marlène Kasaj	(Democratic Republic of the Congo) TP Mazembe	4
2	(Ivory Coast) Habibou Ouédraogo	(Ivory Coast) ASEC Mimosas	3
2	(Egypt) Yasmin Mohamed	(Egypt) FC Masar	3
4	(Morocco) Safa Banouk	(Morocco) AS FAR	2
4	(Ivory Coast) Ami Diallo	(Ivory Coast) ASEC Mimosas	2
4	(Democratic Republic of the Congo) Marlène Yav	(Democratic Republic of the Congo) TP Mazembe	2
7	(Nigeria) Alice Ogebe	(Egypt) FC Masar	1
7	(Tanzania) Hasnath Ubamba	(Egypt) FC Masar	1
7	(Egypt) Hala Moustafa	(Egypt) FC Masar	1
7	(Egypt) Farah Hisham	(Egypt) FC Masar	1
7	(Equatorial Guinea) Ana María Nchama	(Equatorial Guinea) FC 15 de Agosto	1
7	(Mali) Maimouna Traoré	(Mali) USFAS Bamako	1
7	(Mali) Awa Diarra	(Mali) USFAS Bamako	1
7	(Mali) Oumou Kone	(Mali) USFAS Bamako	1
7	(Morocco) Zineb Redouani	(Morocco) AS FAR	1
7	(Morocco) Najat Badri	(Morocco) AS FAR	1
7	(Ivory Coast) Erika Gnounoué	(Ivory Coast) ASEC Mimosas	1
7	(South Africa) Kgalebane Mohlakoana	(Democratic Republic of the Congo) TP Mazembe	1
7	(Equatorial Guinea) Elena Obono	(Democratic Republic of the Congo) TP Mazembe	1
7	(Nigeria) Oluwayemisi Samuel	(Democratic Republic of the Congo) TP Mazembe	1
7	(Ghana) Grace Acheampong	(Democratic Republic of the Congo) TP Mazembe	1
7	(Nigeria) Rosemary Adesina	(Democratic Republic of the Congo) TP Mazembe	1
7	(Morocco) Hanane Ait El Haj	(Morocco) AS FAR	1
7	(Ivory Coast) Essi Dagba	(Ivory Coast) ASEC Mimosas	1
7	(Tanzania) Ester Maseke	(Tanzania) JKT Queens	1
7	(Tanzania) Stumai Athumani	(Tanzania) JKT Queens	1

== Awards ==
The CAF Women's Champions League technical study group selected the following as the best of the tournament.

Award	Player	Team
Best Player	(Ivory Coast) Habibou Ouédraogo	(Ivory Coast) ASEC Mimosas
Top Goal scorer	(Democratic Republic of the Congo) Marlène Kasaj	(Democratic Republic of the Congo) TP Mazembe
Best Goalkeeper	(Morocco) Khadija Er-Rmichi	(Morocco) AS FAR
Fairplay team	(Egypt) FC Masar	

The CAF Technical Study Group has announced the tournament's Best XI as follows:

Goalkeepers	Defenders	Midfielders	Forwards
Best XI
(Morocco) Er-Rmichi	(Ghana) Boakye (Morocco) Benzina (Ivory Coast) N. Diarra (Morocco) Redouani	(Democratic Republic of the Congo) Kasaj (Morocco) Badri (Morocco) Erroudany	(Tanzania) Ubamba (Ivory Coast) Diallo (Ivory Coast) Ouédraogo

Coach: Mohamed Amine Alioua (AS FAR)

== See also ==
- 2024–25 and 2025–26 CAF Champions League
- 2026 FIFA Women's Champions Cup
