= Aline Guimbang Etong =

Cameroonian football referee (born 1997)

- Full name: Aline Marie Noëlle Guimbang A Etong
- Born: 3 January 1997 (age 29); Bafia, Cameroon

Domestic
Years	League	Role
2018–	Guinness Super League	Referee
2022–	Cameroonian Cup	Referee
2023–	Elite One	Referee

International
Years	League	Role
2022–	FIFA listed	Referee
2023–	CAF Women's Champions League	Referee
2024	Women's Africa Cup of Nations	Referee

Aline Marie Noëlle Guimbang A Etong (born 3 January 1997) is a Cameroonian international football referee. She has been an international football referee since 2022.

== Career ==
=== Domestic ===
Guimbang began her refereeing career in 2018, primarily officiating matches in the Guinness Super League and other women's competitions in the country.

In October 2022, she became the first woman to officiate the final of the Cameroonian Cup.

On 28 February 2024, Guimbang was named best female central referee at the 2024 Cameroonian Ballon d'Or awards, in recognition of her performances during the 2023–24 season.

=== International ===
Guimbang has been on the FIFA referees list since 2022 and officiated her first match at the 2022 CAF Women's Champions League UNIFFAC qualifiers.

Included among the officials for the CAF Women's Champions League from 2023, she went on to officiate the final in 2025.
