= Grace Acheampong =

Ghanaian professional footballer

Personal information
- Full name: Grace Acheampong
- Date of birth: 6 September 2000 (age 26)
- Place of birth: Kumasi, Ashanti Region, Ghana
- Height: 1.53 m (5 ft 0 in)
- Position: Midfielder

Team information
- Current team: BIIK Kazygurt

Senior career*
Years	Team	Apps	(Gls)
- Ashtown Ladies
- Ampem Darkoa Ladies
- BIIK Kazygurt

International career
- Ghana
- * Club domestic league appearances and goals

Grace Acheampong (born 6 September 2000) is a Ghanaian professional footballer who plays as a midfielder for BIIK Kazygurt and the Ghana women's national football team. She previously played for Ashtown Ladies and Ampem Darkoa Ladies.

== Career ==
Acheampong was born in Kumasi, the capital city of the Ashanti region of Ghana. Acheampong started her career in Ghana where she played for Ashtown Ladies, before joining Ampem Darkoa Ladies where she eventually gained prominence.

At Ampem Darkoa she helped the team win double, the Ghana Women's Premier League and the Ghana Women's FA Cup in the 2021~~–~~22 season, in the process being adjudged the League's Best Player of the Season.

In July 2023, Acheampong moved to BIIK Kazygurt in Kazakhstan.

Between 2016 and 2018, Acheampong was a member of Ghana's under-17 team, the Black Princesses. In 2016, she was a key member of the squad that competed for Ghana at the 2016 FIFA U-17 Women's World Cup, playing alongside Sandra Owusu Ansah.

Between 2018 and 2020, she was a member of the Ghana under-20 team, the Black Maidens. She was a member of the squad that played in the 2018 FIFA U-20 Women's World Cup, playing alongside Ernestina Abambila, Evelyn Badu and Justice Tweneboaa.

On 18 October 2021, Acheampong received a call-up into the senior women's team, the Black Queens for the 2022 Women's Africa Cup of Nations qualifiers against Nigeria.
