= Alice Ogebe =

Nigerian footballer

Personal information
- Full name: Alice Oya Ogebe
- Date of birth: 30 March 1995 (age 31)
- Height: 1.60 m (5 ft 3 in)
- Position: Forward

Team information
- Current team: Shaanxi Zhidan
- Number: 31

Senior career*
Years	Team	Apps	(Gls)
- Rivers Angels
2018–2019	Red Star Belgrade		
2019–2020	Real Betis B		
2019–2020	Real Betis	2	(0)
2020	KKP Bydgoszcz	8	(2)
2023–2025	1207 Antalya Spor	9	(3)
2025–2026	FC Masar	0	(0)
2026–	Shaanxi Zhidan	0	(0)

International career
2019	Nigeria	8	(0)
- * Club domestic league appearances and goals as of 9 March 2024

Alice Oya Ogebe (born 30 March 1995) is a Nigerian footballer who plays as a forward for Shaanxi Zhidan.

== Club career ==
Ogebe played for Polish Ekstraliga club KKP Bydgoszcz.

End December 2023, she moved to Turkey, and signed a seal with 1207 Antalya Spor to play in the second half of the 2023–24 Super League.

== International career ==
Ogebe made her senior debut on 17 January 2019 in a 0–3 friendly loss to China PR.
