= Khadija Er-Rmichi =

Moroccan footballer

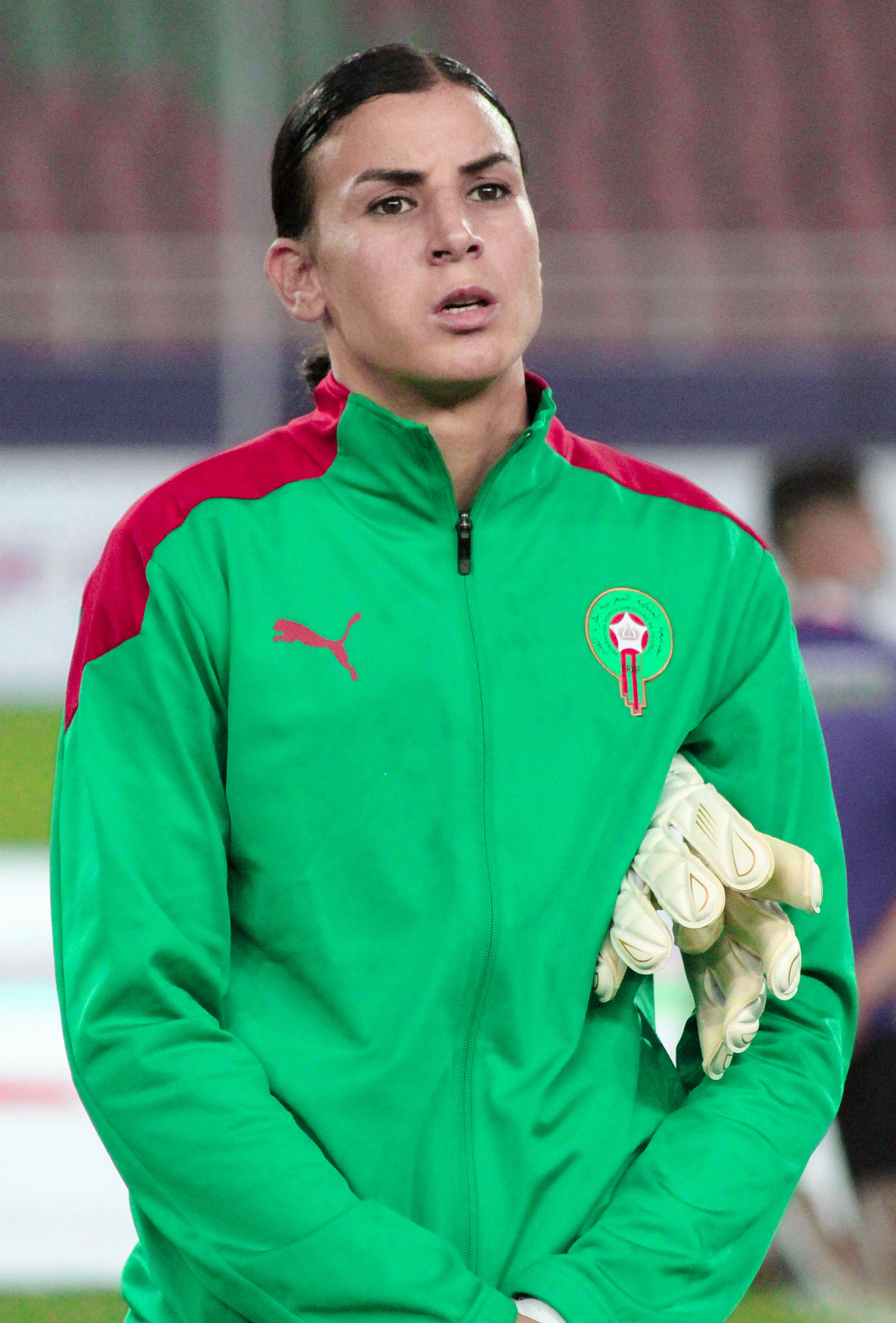
- Er-Rmichi with Morocco at the 2022 Women's Africa Cup of Nations

Personal information
- Full name: Khadija Er-Rmichi
- Date of birth: 16 September 1989 (age 37)
- Place of birth: Khouribga, Morocco
- Height: 1.79 m (5 ft 10 in)
- Position: Goalkeeper

Team information
- Current team: AS FAR
- Number: 1

Youth career
- –2006: Atlas 05

Senior career*
Years	Team	Apps	(Gls)
2007–2008	OC Khouribga		
2008–2010	FC Berrechid		
2010–2012	CM Laâyoune		
2012–	AS FAR		

International career
2010–	Morocco		
Medal record
Representing Morocco
UNAF Women's Tournament
Winner	2020 Tunisia
Women's Africa Cup of Nations
Runner-up	2022 Morocco
Runner-up	2024 Morocco
- * Club domestic league appearances and goals

Khadija Er-Rmichi (Arabic: خديجة الرميشي; born 16 September 1989) is a Moroccan professional footballer who plays as a goalkeeper for AS FAR and the Morocco women's national team.

Er-Rmichi is considered one of the most successful player, and one of the best players in Moroccan and African football. She has won 16 Moroccan Championships, 14 Throne Cups, and three CAF Women's Champions League.

== Club career ==
Er-Rmichi's passion for football began at the age of six in her hometown of Khouribga. At the time, there was no women's team in her town and the sport was considered to be reserved for men. She travelled to Fquih Ben Salah to play with their local women's club.

In 2010, Er-Rmichi returned to Khouribga. She received an offer from Youssoufia Berrechid at the age of 17 to play with the first team. Her experience lasted four years (2007–2010) during which she won a championship and the Throne Cup.

She then moved to CM Laâyoune for two seasons (2010–2012), winning two championships with the team. After playing well with CM Laâyoune, she was scouted by AS FAR.

Er-Rmichi joined AS FAR in 2012. She has won the championship 11 times with the team, and the Throne Cup 11 times, and the UNAF Champions League 2 times, as well as the CAF Women's Champions League.

On 14 November 2023, Er-Rmichi was nominated for the 2023 Goalkeeper of the Year and 2023 African Player of the Year by CAF.

On 21 November 2024, Er-Rmichi was nominated for the 2024 Goalkeeper of the Year and 2024 African Player of the Year by CAF.

== International career ==
Er-Rmichi joined the Morocco squad in 2010. She has played in their qualification efforts for the Women's Africa Cup of Nations in 2012, 2014, 2016, and 2018, as well as their second-place finish at the 2022 Women's Africa Cup of Nations. She also played in qualification for the 2016 and 2020 Olympic Games.

She was part of the squad for the 2023 Women's World Cup. After losing from Germany in the first match, Er-Rmichi managed to keep two clean sheets against South Korea 1-0 and Colombia, 1–0 result and making Morocco the first Arab and North African country to go through to the round of 16.

== Honours ==
FC Berrechid

- Moroccan Championship: 2008
- Moroccan Throne Cup: 2009

CM Laâyoune

- Moroccan Championship (2): 2011, 2012

AS FAR

- Moroccan Championship (13): 2013, 2014, 2016, 2017, 2018, 2019, 2020, 2021, 2022, 2023, 2024, 2025, 2026
- Moroccan Throne Cup (13): 2013, 2014, 2015, 2016, 2017, 2018, 2019, 2020, 2021, 2022, 2023, 2024, 2025
- UNAF Women's Champions League (3): 2021, 2024, 2025
- CAF Women's Champions League (3): 2022, 2025, 2026; runner-up: 2024

Morocco

- Women's Africa Cup of Nations runner-up: 2022, 2024
- UNAF Women's Tournament: 2020

Individual

- Moroccan Women's Championship Best Goalkeeper: 2018, 2022, 2023, 2024
- CAF Women's Champions League Best Goalkeeper: 2022, 2025, 2026
- CAF Women's Champions League Team of the Tournament: 2022, 2025

== See also ==
- List of Morocco women's international footballers
