= Anissa Lahmari =

Moroccan footballer (born 1997)

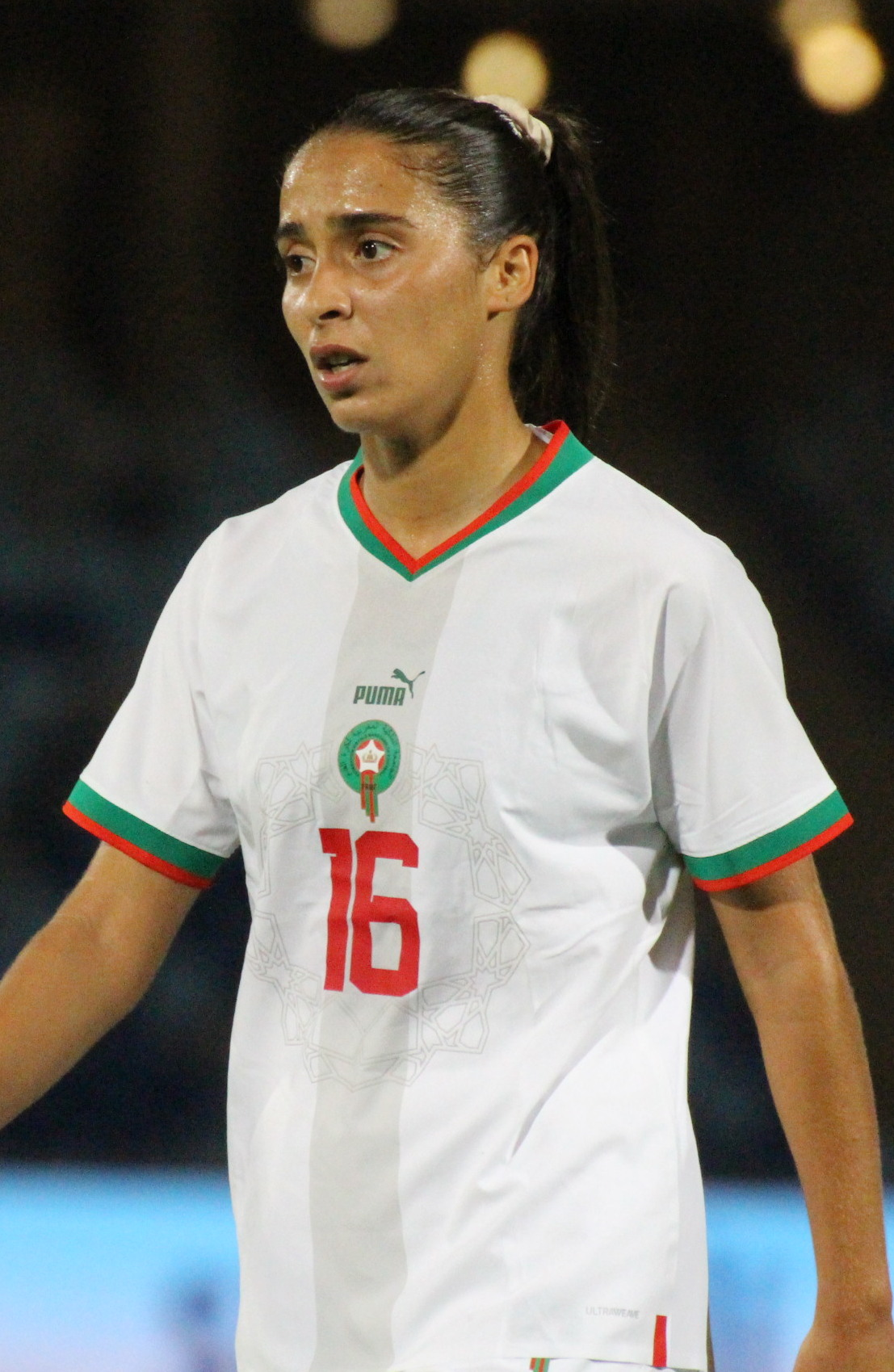
- Lahmari with Morocco in 2023

Personal information
- Date of birth: 17 February 1997 (age 29)
- Place of birth: Saint-Cloud, France
- Height: 1.66 m (5 ft 5 in)
- Position: Midfielder

Team information
- Current team: AS FAR
- Number: 92

Youth career
- 2005–2008: AC Boulogne-Billancourt
- 2008–2009: Issy
- 2009–2010: Issy-Les-Moulineaux
- 2010–2016: Paris Saint-Germain

Senior career*
Years	Team	Apps	(Gls)
2015–2019	Paris Saint-Germain	17	(4)
2017	→ Reading (loan)	6	(0)
2017–2018	→ Paris FC (loan)	21	(2)
2019	→ Soyaux (loan)	6	(0)
2019–2020	Soyaux	13	(1)
2020–2021	Guingamp	19	(1)
2021–2022	Soyaux	12	(2)
2022–2023	Guingamp	18	(2)
2023–2024	Levante Las Planas	25	(7)
2024–2025	Levante UD	21	(1)
2025–	AS FAR	1	(2)

International career^{‡}
2013	France U16	3	(4)
2013	France U17	6	(1)
2015–2016	France U19	13	(8)
2018–2019	France B	10	(2)
2023	Algeria	1	(0)
2023–	Morocco	15	(2)
Medal record
Women's football
Representing Morocco
Women's Africa Cup of Nations
Runner-up	2024 Morocco
- * Club domestic league appearances and goals as of 14 September 2025 ‡ National team caps and goals as of 30 May 2024

Anissa Lahmari (Arabic: أنيسة لحماري; born 17 February 1997) is a professional footballer who plays as a midfielder for Moroccan Women's Championship D1 club AS FAR. Born in France, she plays for the Morocco national team.

== Club career ==
Lahmari is a youth academy graduate of Paris Saint-Germain. She made her senior debut for the club on 22 March 2015 by scoring a goal in a 2–0 away win against Glasgow City in the quarter-finals of UEFA Women's Champions League. However, she struggled to find playing time at the capital club in following seasons and was loaned out to Reading, Paris FC and Soyaux. She announced her departure from Paris Saint-Germain in May 2019 after contract expiration.

On 30 August 2023, Lahmari joined Spanish club Levante Las Planas. In July 2024, she joined Levante UD.

On 28 August 2025, Lahmari joined Moroccan record-winning club AS FAR. In January 2026, she played in the semifinal of the inaugural FIFA Women's Champions Cup against Arsenal.

== International career ==
=== France youth ===
Lahmari played for France youth teams in European competitions. She represented France at the 2013 UEFA Women's Under-17 Championship and the 2015 UEFA Women's Under-19 Championship. She also won the 2019 Turkish Women's Cup with the France under-23 team.

=== Algeria ===
In February 2023, Lahmari was called up to the Algeria national team by coach Farid Benstiti. In April 2023, she made her debut in a 4–0 win in a friendly match against Tanzania.

=== Morocco ===
In June 2023, Lahmari was included in the 28-player preliminary squad of Morocco for the 2023 FIFA Women's World Cup. She was later named in the final squad which was announced on 11 July. On 3 August 2023, she scored the only goal in a 1–0 victory over Colombia which helped her country to reach the knockout phase of the World Cup, an effort that also earned her the player of the match award. Following her remarkable performance, Lahmari was nominated for the 2023 African Women's Footballer of the Year Award.

Lahmari was part of the Moroccan squad at the 2024 Women's Africa Cup of Nations.

== Personal life ==
Lahmari was born in Saint-Cloud to an Algerian father and a Moroccan mother.

== Honours ==
AS FAR

- Moroccan Women's Botola Pro: 2025–26
- Moroccan Women's Throne Cup: 2024–25
- CAF Women's Champions League: 2025, 2026
- UNAF WCL Qualifiers: 2025

France B

- Turkish Women's Cup: 2019

Morocco

- Women's Africa Cup of Nations runner-up: 2024

== Career statistics ==
=== Club ===
As of 27 May 2023

Appearances and goals by club, season and competition
Club	Season	League			Cup		Continental		Total	
Club	Season	Division	Apps	Goals	Apps	Goals	Apps	Goals	Apps	Goals
Paris Saint-Germain	2014–15	D1F	2	1	0	0	2	1	4	2
Paris Saint-Germain	2015–16	D1F	3	1	1	1	0	0	4	2
Paris Saint-Germain	2016–17	D1F	6	1	3	2	2	0	11	3
Paris Saint-Germain	2018–19	D1F	6	1	0	0	2	0	8	1
Paris Saint-Germain	Total		17	4	4	3	6	1	27	8
Reading (loan)	2017	FA WSL	6	0	—		—		6	0
Paris FC (loan)	2017–18	D1F	21	2	1	0	—		22	2
Soyaux (loan)	2018–19	D1F	6	0	1	0	—		7	0
Soyaux	2019–20	D1F	13	1	2	0	—		15	1
Guingamp	2020–21	D1F	19	1	1	0	—		20	1
Soyaux	2021–22	D1F	12	2	1	0	—		13	2
Guingamp	2022–23	D1F	18	2	2	0	—		20	2
Career total			112	12	12	3	6	1	130	16

=== International ===
As of match played 30 May 2024

Appearances and goals by national team and year
National team	Year	Apps	Goals
Algeria	2023	1	0
Morocco	2023	11	2
Morocco	2024	4	0
Morocco	Total	15	2
Career total		16	2

Scores and results list Morocco's goal tally first, score column indicates score after each Lahmari goal.

List of international goals scored by Anissa Lahmari
No.	Date	Venue	Opponent	Score	Result	Competition
1	3 August 2023	Perth Rectangular Stadium, Perth, Australia	Colombia	1–0	1–0	2023 FIFA Women's World Cup
2	26 October 2023	Stade de Marrakech, Marrakesh, Morocco	Namibia	2–0	2–0	2024 CAF Women's Olympic qualification
