= Nesryne El Chad =

Moroccan footballer (born 2003)

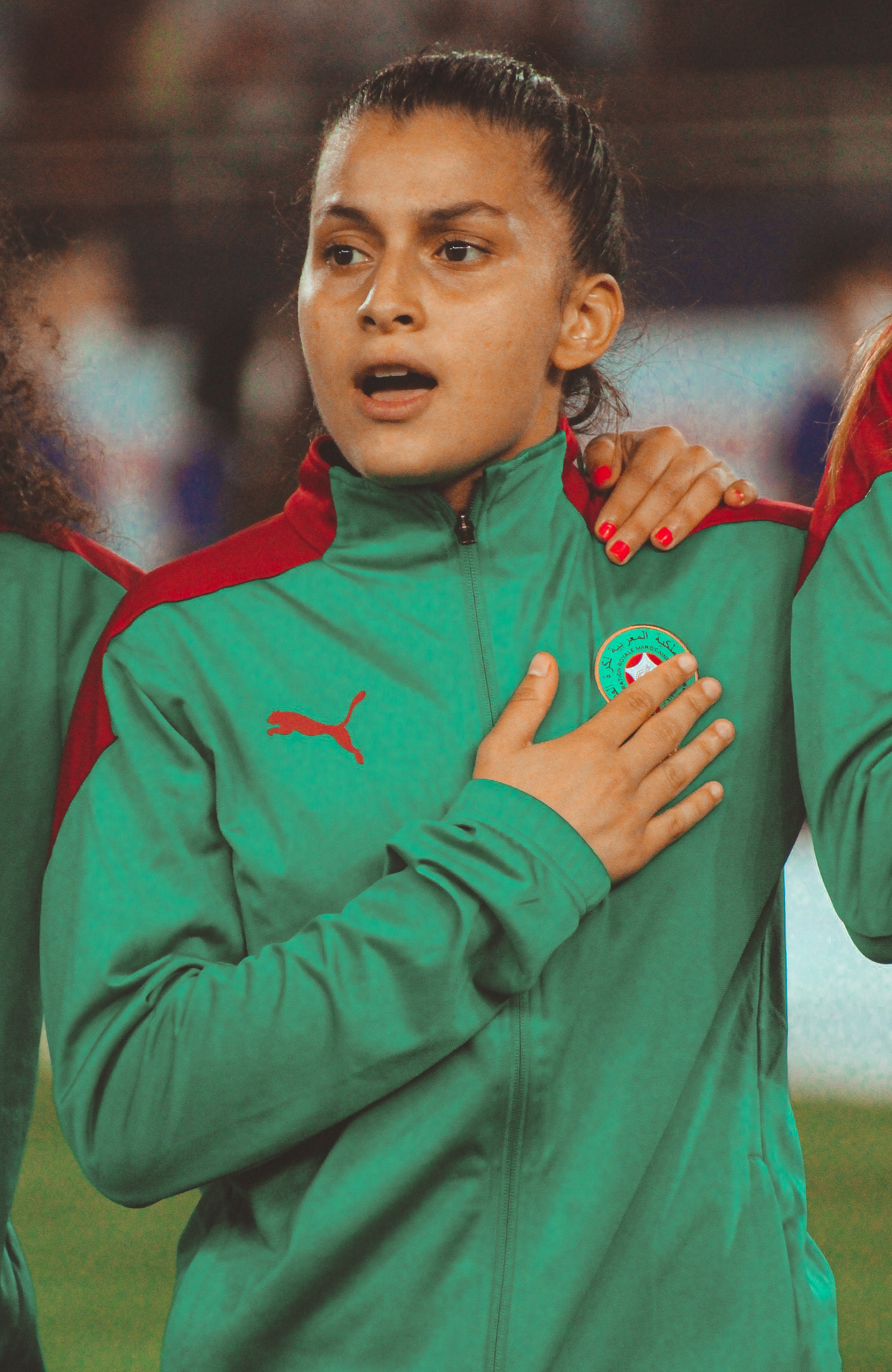
- El Chad with Morocco in 2022

Personal information
- Date of birth: 13 March 2003 (age 23)
- Place of birth: Saint-Étienne, France
- Height: 1.67 m (5 ft 6 in)
- Position: Defender

Team information
- Current team: Lille
- Number: 5

Youth career
- 2014–2021: Saint-Étienne

Senior career*
Years	Team	Apps	(Gls)
2021–2022	Saint-Étienne	8	(0)
2022–	Lille	30	(2)

International career^{‡}
2020–2022	Morocco U20		
2022–	Morocco		
Medal record
Representing Morocco
Women's Africa Cup of Nations
Second place	2022 Morocco
- * Club domestic league appearances and goals as of 11 November 2024 ‡ National team caps and goals as of 5 December 2023

Nesryne El Chad (Arabic: نسرين الشاد; born 13 March 2003) is a professional footballer who plays as a defender for Seconde Ligue club Lille. Born in France, she represents Morocco at international level.

== Early life ==
El Chad was born in Saint-Étienne to Moroccan parents from Meknes.

Before devoting herself definitively to playing football, she played tennis for a period of six years.

== International career ==
She has appeared in eight matches for Morocco and scored a goal against Uganda at the 2022 Women's Africa Cup of Nations, making her the youngest-ever Moroccan player to score in the tournament. She was named to the Morocco squad for the 2023 FIFA Women's World Cup.

== Honours ==
Morocco

- Africa Cup of Nations runner-up: 2022

Individual

- African Women's Youth Player of the Year: 2023
- IFFHS CAF Women's Team of The Year: 2023
