= Sarah Kassi =

Moroccan footballer (born 2003)

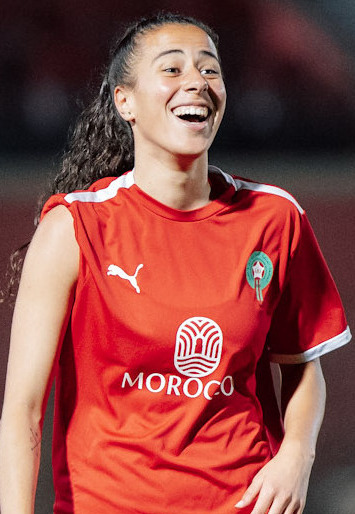

Personal information
- Date of birth: 9 September 2003 (age 23)
- Place of birth: Nogent-sur-Marne, France
- Height: 1.65 m (5 ft 5 in)
- Position: Defensive midfielder

Team information
- Current team: Le Havre
- Number: 17

Senior career*
Years	Team	Apps	(Gls)
2019–2021	Saint-Maur	17	(0)
2021–2025	Fleury	71	(1)
2025–	Le Havre	10	(0)

International career^{‡}
2019	France U16	5	(0)
2019	France U17	4	(0)
2022	France U19	2	(0)
2023–	Morocco	7	(0)
- * Club domestic league appearances and goals as of 19:35, 1 January 2026 (UTC) ‡ National team caps and goals as of 20 July 2023 (prior the 2023 FIFA Women's World Cup)

Sarah Kassi (born 9 September 2003) is a professional footballer who plays as a defensive midfielder for Première Ligue club Le Havre AC. Born in France, she plays for the Morocco national team.

== Club career ==
Kassi has previously played for FC Fleury 91. On 10 June 2025, she was announced to have signed a two-year contract for fellow Première Ligue club Le Havre AC.

== International career ==
She has played for the France women's U-16, U-17 and U-19 squads. She competed at the 2022 UEFA Women's Under-17 Championship in which France reached finished third. She also played in qualifications for the 2022 Euro with the U-19 team.

She was chosen as part of Morocco's squad for the 2023 FIFA Women's World Cup.
