= Najat Badri =

Moroccan footballer (born 1988)

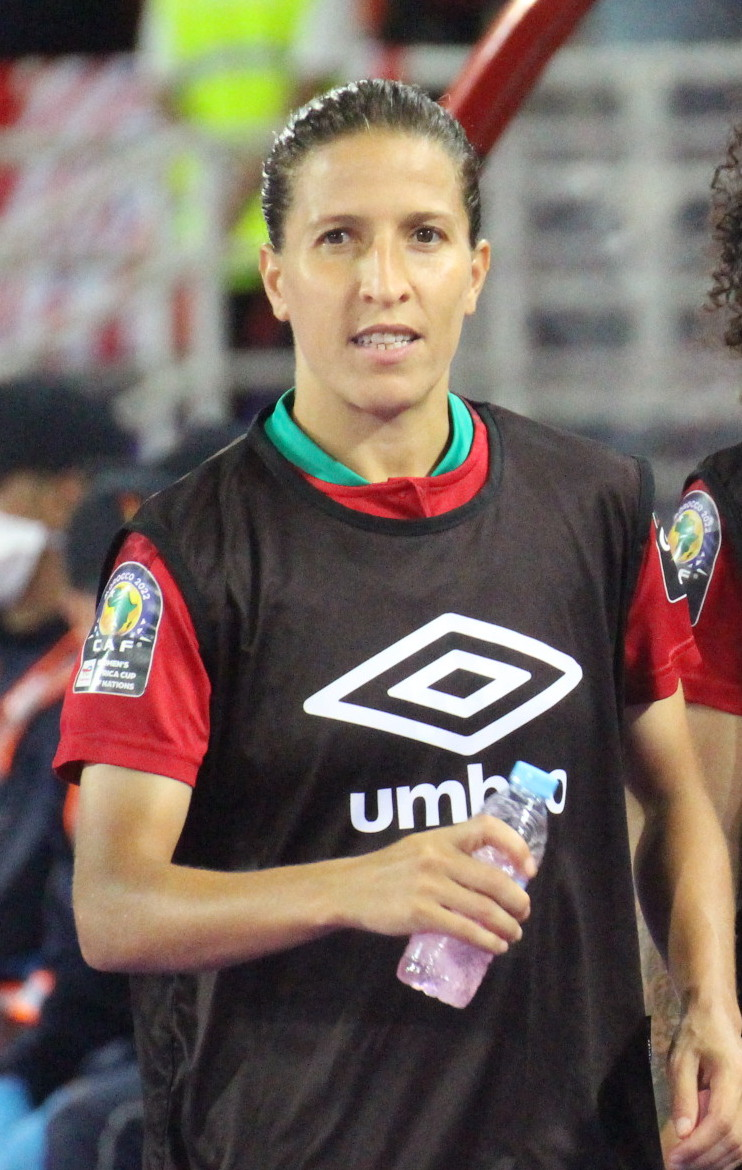

Personal information
- Date of birth: 19 May 1988 (age 38)
- Place of birth: Salé, Morocco
- Height: 1.65 m (5 ft 5 in)
- Positions: Midfielder; defender

Team information
- Current team: AS FAR
- Number: 10

Senior career*
Years	Team	Apps	(Gls)
2013–	AS FAR		

International career^{‡}
2007–	Morocco		
Medal record
Representing Morocco
Women's Africa Cup of Nations
Second place	2022 Morocco
- * Club domestic league appearances and goals ‡ National team caps and goals as of 26 july 2023

Najat Badri (Arabic: نجاة بدري; born 19 May 1988) is a Moroccan professional footballer who plays as a midfielder for AS FAR and as a defender for the Morocco women's national team.

== Club career ==
Badri first played with Raja Aïn Harrouda before joining AS FAR.

As an AS FAR player, Badri has won the Moroccan Women's Championship 8 times, and the Moroccan Women Throne Cup 6 times.

She participated in the first edition of the CAF Champion's League which took place in Egypt in November 2021. AS FAR finished third. Badri played in all matches. She scored against Hasaacas Ladies in AS FAR's 2-1 semifinal loss.

She won the CAF Women's Champions League in 2022 with AS FAR thanks to a 4–0 victory over titleholders Mamelodi Sundowns.

== International career ==
Badri capped for Morocco at senior level during the 2018 Africa Women Cup of Nations qualification (first round).

She was part of the squad for the 2022 Women's Africa Cup of Nations where Morocco made it to the finals of the tournament before being defeated 2–1 by South Africa.

She was chosen as part of the squad for the 2023 Women's World Cup and played all three matches of the group stage.

== Honours ==
AS FAR

- Moroccan Women's Championship (11): 2013, 2014, 2016, 2017, 2018, 2019, 2020, 2021, 2022, 2023, 2024
- Moroccan Women Throne Cup (11): 2013, 2014, 2015, 2016, 2017, 2018, 2019, 2020, 2021, 2022, 2023
- UNAF Women's Champions League (1): 2021
- CAF Women's Champions League (1): 2022; third place: 2021, 2023

Morocco

- Women's Africa Cup of Nations runner-up: 2022

== See also ==
- List of Morocco women's international footballers
