= Nouhaila Benzina =

Moroccan footballer (born 1998)

Nouhaila Benzina نهيلة بنزينة
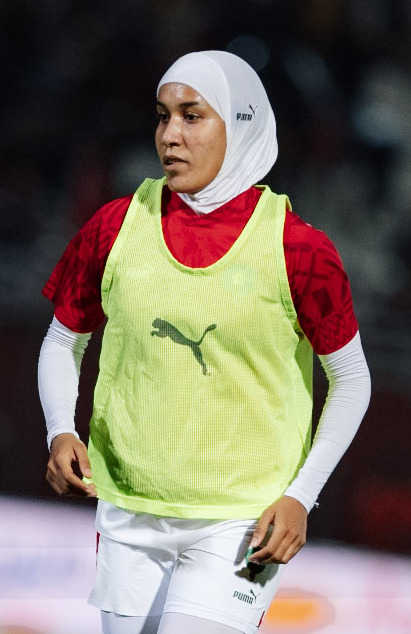

Personal information
- Date of birth: 11 May 1998 (age 28)
- Place of birth: Kenitra, Morocco
- Height: 1.73 m (5 ft 8 in)
- Position: Defender

Team information
- Current team: ASFAR
- Number: 5

Senior career*
Years	Team	Apps	(Gls)
2016–	ASFAR		

International career
2017–	Morocco U20		
2017–	Morocco		
Medal record
Representing Morocco
UNAF Women's Tournament
Winner	2020 Tunisia
Women's Africa Cup of Nations
Second place	2022 Morocco
- * Club domestic league appearances and goals

Nouhaila Benzina (Arabic: نهيلة بنزينة; born 11 May 1998) is a Moroccan professional footballer who plays as a defender for AS FAR and the Morocco women's national team.

In July 2023, she made history as the first female player to ever wear an Islamic headscarf (a hijab) at the senior-level FIFA Women's World Cup. She has been considered a role model for Muslim female footballers.

== Club career ==
Benzina has played for AS FAR in Morocco.

== International career ==
Benzina has capped for Morocco at under-20 and senior levels.

Benzina was included in the Moroccan national team squad for the 2023 FIFA Women's World Cup, which marked the debut World Cup appearance for both Benzina and the Moroccan national team. Morocco's first Women's World Cup match was on 24 July against Germany, where Benzina made headlines around the world for being the first player on the team roster to wear a hijab at a World Cup match, though she did not play in the match. On 30 July she became the first player to play in a World Cup match wearing a hijab in her country's 1–0 win against South Korea. French press, namely L'Équipe, made Islamophobic comments directed at her after the match.

== Honours ==
AS FAR

- Moroccan Women's Championship (8): 2017, 2018, 2019, 2020, 2021, 2022, 2023,2024
- Moroccan Women Throne Cup (7): 2017, 2018, 2019, 2020, 2021, 2022, 2023
- UNAF Women's Champions League (2): 2021, 2024
- CAF Women's Champions League (1): 2022; third place: 2021

Morocco

- Africa Cup of Nations runner-up: 2022
- UNAF Women's Tournament: 2020

== See also ==
- List of Morocco women's international footballers
