= Hanane Aït El Haj =

Moroccan footballer (born 1994)

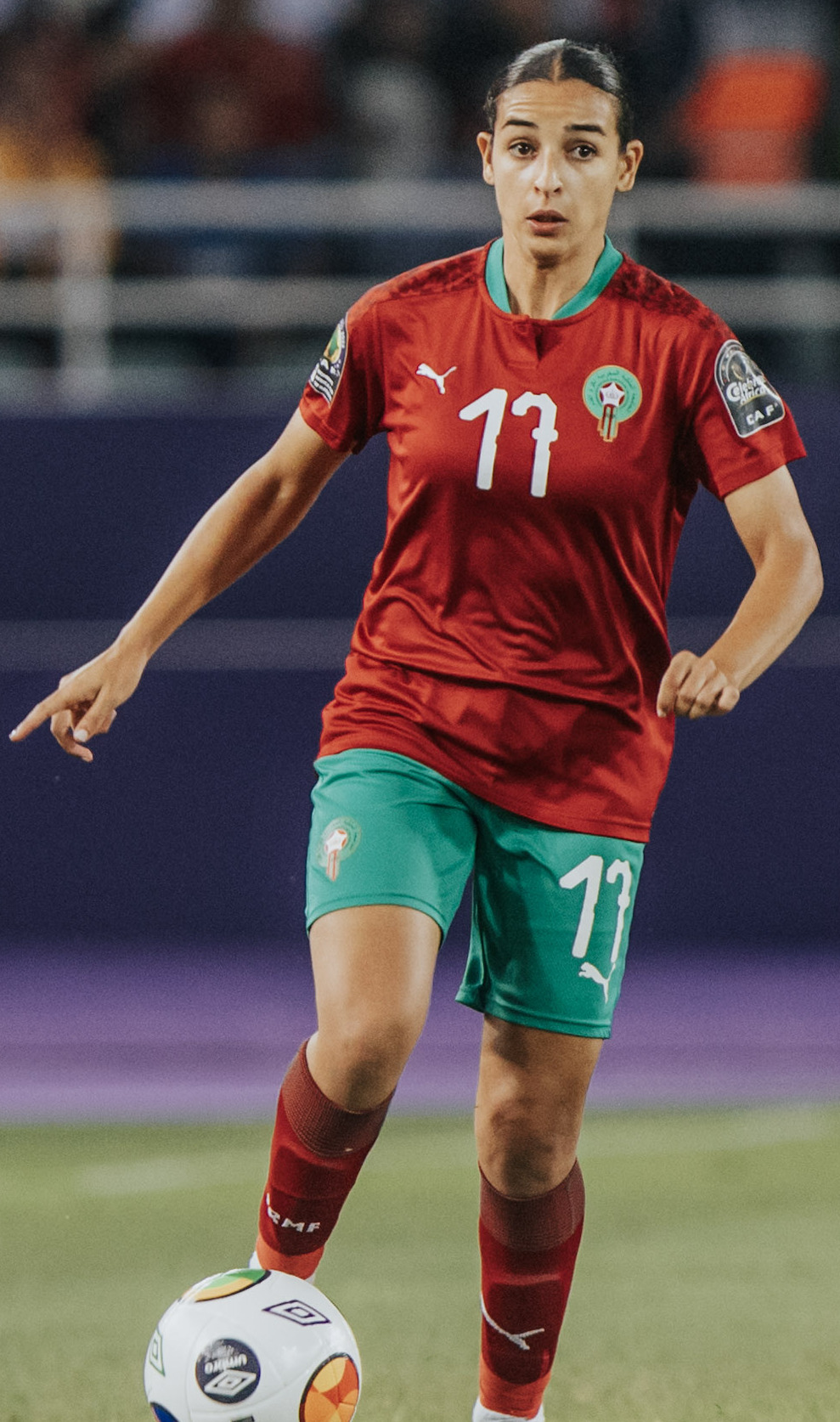
- Aït El Haj with Morocco at the 2022 Women's Africa Cup of Nations

Personal information
- Date of birth: 2 November 1994 (age 32)
- Place of birth: Agadir, Morocco
- Height: 1.60 m (5 ft 3 in)
- Position: Defender

Team information
- Current team: Deportivo Alavés
- Number: 23

Senior career*
Years	Team	Apps	(Gls)
2014–2016	CM Laâyoune	39	(24)
2016–2020	AS FAR		
2020–2021	Zaragoza CFF	12	(0)
2021–2024	AS FAR		
2024–2025	Valencia CF	19	(0)
2025–2026	AS FAR		
2026-	Deportivo Alavés		

International career^{‡}
2014–	Morocco		
Medal record
Representing Morocco
UNAF Women's Tournament
Winner	2020 Tunisia
Women's Africa Cup of Nations
Runner-up	2022 Morocco
Runner-up	2024 Morocco
- * Club domestic league appearances and goals as of 27 August 2025 ‡ National team caps and goals as of 7 August 2023

Hanane Aït El Haj (Arabic: حنان أيت الحاج; born 2 November 1994) is a Moroccan professional footballer who plays as a defender for Deportivo Alavés and the Morocco women's national team. She often plays as a right back.

== Club career ==
Aït El Haj began her club career playing for AS FAR in the Moroccan Women's Championship in 2016. She played for Zaragoza CFF in Segunda División Pro on a one-year contract for the 2020–21 season before returning to AS FAR. She has won the league with AS FAR six times and the Throne Cup four times. In 2022, the team won the CAF Women's Champions League after placing third in 2021.

== International career ==
Aït El Haj was capped for Morocco at senior level during the 2018 Africa Women Cup of Nations qualification (first round). She played in Morocco's runners-up performance in the 2022 Women's Africa Cup of Nations, which was hosted by Morocco. She was part of the squad which qualified Morocco for the 2023 FIFA Women's World Cup, their first appearance at the tournament. At the World Cup, she scored an own goal in Morocco's 6–0 loss to Germany in the group stage. She also provided an assist to Morocco's maiden World Cup goal by Ibtissam Jraidi in their 1–0 victory over South Korea.

== Honours ==
CM Laâyoune

- Moroccan Championship: 2015

AS FAR

- Moroccan Championship (8): 2017, 2018, 2019, 2021, 2022, 2023, 2024, 2026
- Moroccan Throne Cup (9): 2016, 2017, 2018, 2019, 2020, 2021, 2022, 2023, 2025
- UNAF Women's Champions League: 2021
- CAF Women's Champions League: 2022, 2025

Morocco

- Africa Cup of Nations runner-up: 2022, 2024
- UNAF Women's Tournament: 2020

Individual

- Moroccan Women's Championship Best Player: 2024

== See also ==
- List of Morocco women's international footballers
