= Vanessa Djomo =

Cameroonian footballer (born 1998)

Personal information
- Full name: Vanessa Noelle Kiomegne Djomo
- Date of birth: 25 December 1998 (age 27)
- Place of birth: Cameroon
- Position: Midfielder

Team information
- Current team: Kdz. Ereğli Belediye Spor
- Number: 8

Senior career*
Years	Team	Apps	(Gls)
2015-2021	Louves Minproff		
2021	Walling Municipality		
2021-2022	Ankara BB Fomget GS	11	(2)
2022–	Kdz. Ereğli Belediye Spor	7	(1)

International career
2018	Cameroon U-17		
2016	Cameroon		
- * Club domestic league appearances and goals as of 16 October 2022

Vanessa Noelle Kiomegne Djomo (born 25 December 1998), also known as Vanessa Djomo or Kiomegne Djomo Vanessa, is a Cameroonian footballer who plays as a midfielder for Kdz. Ereğli Belediye Spor in the Turkish Women's Super League with jersey number 8.

== Club career ==
Djomo has played for Louves Minproff based in Yaoundé in her country between 2015 and 2021. In October 2016, the team she captained won the champions title of the Cameroonian Women's Cup. In November 2018, she enjoyed her team's champions title of the Cameroonian Women's Cup again. In the 2020–21 season of the Guinness Super League, her team runners-up.ç

In January 2021, Djome went to Nepal to play with three other women's footballers from her country for the Waling Municipality Club in the 2021 National Women's League of Nepal.

In December 2021, Djomo moved to Turkey, and joined Ankara BB Fomget GS to play in the Women's Super League. She scored two goals in eleven matches of the 2021-22 league season. In the league's second half, she transferred to Kdz. Ereğli Belediye Spor.

== International career ==
In March 2016, she was selected to the Cameroon women's national football team to play in a preparation game for the ongoing 2016 Women's Africa Cup of Nations.

Djomo was admitted to the Cameroon women's national under-17 football team, and took part at the 2018 FIFA U-17 Women's World Cup held in Uruguay.

== Honours ==
Cameroonian Women's Cup

Louves Minproff
Winners (2): 2016, 2018

Guinness Super League

Louves Minproff
Runners-up (1): 2020-21
