= Kevine Ossol =

Cameroonian footballer (born 2000)

Personal information
- Date of birth: 19 August 2000 (age 26)
- Place of birth: Cameroon
- Position: Forward

Team information
- Current team: Hakkarigücü
- Number: 25

Senior career*
Years	Team	Apps	(Gls)
2019–2021	Louves Minproff		
2021–2022	Awa Yaoundé		
2022–2023	Éclair de Sa'a		
2023–2024	Nantes		
2025–	Hakkarigücü	21	(0)

International career
2021–	Cameroon		
- * Club domestic league appearances and goals as of 3 April 2026

Kevine Ossol (born 19 August 2000) is a Cameroonian professional women's football forward who plays in the Turkish Super League for Hakkarigücü. She was part of the Cameroon women's national football team.

== Club career ==
Ossol played in her country's Women's Championship for Louves Minproff (2019–2021), Awa Yaoundé (2021–2022) and Éclair de Sa'a (2022–2023). Mid July 2023, she left her team in Cameroon, and went to France to join Nantes. She played in the 2023–24 Première Ligue season.

In September 2025, she moved to Turkey, and signed a deal with the Super League club Hakkari.

== International career ==
Ossol was part of the Cameroon senior women's national team, nicknamed the "Lionesses". She played at the 2022 Women's Africa Cup of Nations qualification, and scored a goal in the match against Gambia on 23 February 2022. The same year, she played in two friendly matches, against Senegal on 19 June, and France on 25 June, before taking part at the 2022 Women's Africa Cup of Nations.

== Personal life ==
Kevine Ossol was born on 19 August 2000.
