= 2025 UNCAF Women's U-19 Tournament =

UNCAF Women's U-19 Tournament 2025
Torneo Sub-19 Femenino UNCAF 2025

Tournament details
- Host country: Panama
- City: Panama City
- Dates: January 16–22, 2025
- Teams: 6 (from 1 confederation)
- Venue(s): (in 1 host city)

Final positions
- Champions: Panama (1st title)
- Runners-up: Nicaragua
- Third place: El Salvador
- Fourth place: Honduras

Tournament statistics
- Matches played: 9
- Goals scored: 37 (4.11 per match)
- Top scorer(s): (Costa Rica) Sheika Scott (Costa Rica) Marian Solano (Honduras) Alexandra Merriam (Panama) Kayra Pérez (3 Goals each)

The 2025 UNCAF Women's U-19 Tournament (Spanish: Torneo Femenino Sub-19 UNCAF 2025) was the second edition of the UNCAF Women's U-19 Tournament, the biennial international FIFA's sponsored women's youth football tournament contested by the under-19 national teams of the member associations of the Central American Football Union. The tournament was contested by six teams from January 16 to 22, 2025 in Panama City, Panama.

El Salvador were the defending champions, having won the 2023 edition. but failed to defend their title after failing to qualify for the final. Host and last edition's silver medalist Panama won their first title by defeating Nicaragua 3–0 in the final.

== Participating teams ==
Initially, all seven UNCAF member nations were scheduled to participate in the tournament. However, Belize, originally drawn into Group A, withdrew before the competition began.

Team	App	Last	Best placement in the tournament
Costa Rica	2nd	2023	Third place (2023)
El Salvador	2nd	2023	Champions (2023)
Guatemala	2nd	2023	Sixth place (2023)
Honduras	2nd	2023	Fourth place (2023)
Nicaragua	2nd	2023	Seventh place (2023)
Panama	2nd	2023	Runners-up (2023)

== Squads ==
Players born between 1 January 2006 and 31 December 2009 are eligible to compete in the tournament.

== Group Stage ==
All times are local, EST (UTC-5)

=== Group A ===
Pos	Team	Pld	W	D	L	GF	GA	GD	Pts	Qualification
1	Panama (H)	2	2	0	0	5	1	+4	6	Final
2	Honduras	2	1	0	1	4	4	0	3	Third place match
3	Guatemala	2	0	0	2	3	7	−4	0	Fifth place match

Source: TBA
(H) Hosts
January 16, 2025
15:00

Panama	2–0	Honduras
Pérez 35'; Bello 68'	Report

COS Sports Plaza, Panama City
Referee: Daniela Romero (El Salvador)

January 18, 2025
15:00

Honduras	4–2	Guatemala
Merriam 17', 23', 66'; Hernández 41'		Polanco 56', 90+3'

COS Sports Plaza, Panama City

January 20, 2025
15:00

Guatemala	1–3	Panama
Fernández 79'	Report	Pérez 19'; Onodera 47'; Robles 49'

COS Sports Plaza, Panama City
Referee: Erika González (Mexico)

=== Group B ===
Pos	Team	Pld	W	D	L	GF	GA	GD	Pts	Qualification
1	Nicaragua	2	1	1	0	6	5	+1	4	Final
2	El Salvador	2	0	2	0	4	4	0	2	Third place match
3	Costa Rica	2	0	1	1	5	6	−1	1	Fifth place match

Source: TBA
January 16, 2025
9:30

Nicaragua	4–3	Costa Rica
Pavón 45+1'; Canales 49'; Sarantes 61'; Garache 74'		Solano 30'; Scott 35', 42'

COS Sports Plaza, Panama City

January 18, 2025
9:30

El Salvador	2–2	Nicaragua
Alvarenga 10'; Villa 82'		Toval 2'; Sarantes 20'

COS Sports Plaza, Panama City

January 20, 2025
9:30

Costa Rica	2–2	El Salvador
González 19', 38'		Marín 36' (red card) 82'; Alvarenga 46'; Saravia (red card) 90'

COS Sports Plaza, Panama City

== Placement matches ==
=== 5th Place ===
January 22, 2025
9:30

Guatemala	1–3	Costa Rica
Raxon 45+2'		Solano 24', 34'; Scott 40' (pen.)

COS Sports Plaza, Panama City

=== 3rd Place ===
January 22, 2025
9:30

Honduras	0–3	El Salvador
		Carrillo 24'; Velásquez 61'; Torres 77'

COS Sports Plaza, Panama City

=== Final ===
January 22, 2025
9:30

Panama	3–0	Nicaragua
Serna 9'; Pérez 57'; Arosemena 73'	Report

COS Sports Plaza, Panama City
Referee: Saphire Stockman (Costa Rica)

== Goalscorers ==
There were 37 goals scored in 9 matches, for an average of 4.11 goals per match.

3 goals

- (Costa Rica) Sheika Scott
- (Costa Rica) Marian Solano
- (Honduras) Alexandra Merriam
- (Panama) Kayra Pérez

2 goals

- (Costa Rica) Alondra González
- (El Salvador) Valentina Alvarenga
- (Guatemala) Dina Polanco
- (Nicaragua) Jenifer Sarantes

1 goal

- (El Salvador) Angelina Carrillo
- (El Salvador) Makayla Marín
- (El Salvador) Janelle Torres
- (El Salvador) Karoline Velásquez
- (El Salvador) Sarina Villa
- (Guatemala) Yaretzy Fernández
- (Guatemala) Betzabé Raxon
- (Honduras) Izabella Hernández
- (Nicaragua) Mitzy Canales
- (Nicaragua) Perla Garache
- (Nicaragua) Sara Pavón
- (Nicaragua) Jennfer Toval
- (Panama) Analía Arosemena
- (Panama) Nathalie Bello
- (Panama) Alison Onodera
- (Panama) Anaí Robles
- (Panama) Jorgelis Serna
