= Lekié FF =

Cameroonian women's football team

- Full name: Lekié Football Filles
- League: Cameroonian Women's Championship

Lekié Football Filles is a Cameroonian professional women's football club in Obala who plays in the Cameroonian Women's Championship, the top tier of Cameroonian women's football.

== History ==
In 2022, Lekié was promoted to the first division, finishing in seventh place. At the end of 2022, the club made headlines by signing Cameroonian international Brenda Tabe from AS Awa for 1.4 million FCFA, marking the most expensive transfer in the history of the Cameroonian championship. In 2023, Lekié achieved the first title in its history by winning the Cameroon Championship, and later that year, they completed the double by also winning the Cameroon Women's Cup.

== Honours ==
Type	Competition	Titles	Winning Seasons	Runners-up
Domestic	Cameroonian Women's Championship	1	2023	2024
Domestic	Cameroonian Women's Cup	2	2023, 2024	

== Squad ==
As of 1 November 2026

Note: Flags indicate national team as defined under FIFA eligibility rules; some limited exceptions apply. Players may hold more than one non-FIFA nationality.

No.	Pos.	Nation	Player
1	GK	CMR	Chantal Ngah
3	FW	CMR	Ajara Nchout
5	DF	CMR	Orline Djutchie
6	MF	CMR	Joana Likound
7	FW	CMR	Raïssa Nnanga (C)
9	FW	CMR	Brenda Tabe
10	MF	CMR	Nicole Ndjock
11	MF	CMR	Princesse Ngon Biyo
12	MF	CMR	Judith Ekodeck
13	FW	CMR	Charlène Meyong
14	MF	CMR	Shalom Tim

No.	Pos.	Nation	Player
15	MF	CMR	Elisabeth Sekem
16	GK	CMR	Marthe Ongmahan
18	DF	CMR	Claudia Dabda
19	DF	CMR	Prisca Mache
20	MF	CMR	Codelia Achang
21	FW	NGR	Mirabel Onwuka
22	DF	CMR	Isabelle Dane
23	DF	CMR	Charleine Abada
24	DF	CMR	Ladifatou Ngambe
26	DF	CMR	Yvana Makana

== See also ==
- Cameroonian Women's Championship
- Cameroonian Women's Cup
- CAF Women's Champions League
