= Marie Ngah =

Cameroonian footballer (born 2002)

Marie Ngah Manga
Personal information
- Full name: Marie Gisele Divine Ngah Manga
- Date of birth: 20 October 2002 (age 24)
- Place of birth: Cameroon
- Height: 1.72 m (5 ft 8 in)
- Position: Forward

Senior career*
Years	Team	Apps	(Gls)
–2021	Amazone		
2021–2022	Okzhetpes		(42)
2022–2023	Lekié	30	(23)
2023–2024	Hakkarigücü	22	(20)
2024–2026	Galatasaray	42	(41)
2026–	Fenerbahçe	2	(4)

International career
2018	Cameroon U-17	4	(2)
2017	Cameroon U-20	2	(0)
2025	Cameroon	7	(6)
Medal record
Women's Africa Cup of Nations
Gold medal – first place	2026 Morocco
- * Club domestic league appearances and goals as of 12:59, 21 May 2026 (UTC)

Marie Gisele Divine Ngah Manga, known as Marie Ngah Manga (born 20 October 2002), is a Cameroonian professional footballer, who plays as a forward for Fenerbahçe in the Turkish Women's Football Super League.

She was part of the Cameroon women's U-17 and U-20 teams before she became a member of the Cameroon women's team.

== Club career ==
Ngah started her football career at Amazone FAP. In 2021, she went to Kazakhstan, and joined Okzhetpes in Kokshetau. She scored 42 goals, and was named the "Top goalscorer" of the 2021–22 Kazakhstan Premier League. After one season, she returned home, and signed with Lekié, where she netted 23 goals in 30 games, and became again "Top goalscorer", this time of the 2022–23 Cameroonian Women's Championship. Her team finished the league season as champion. In 2023, she moved to Turkey, and played for Hakkarigücü in the 2023–24 Women's Super League season. She scored 20 goals in 22 matches. She was awarded the "2023 Cameroon Ballon d'Or". The next season, she transferred to the Istanbul-based, league champion club Galatasaray.

== International career ==
Ngah played for the Cameroon women's U-17 team at the 2018 African U-17 World Cup qualification, and 2018 FIFA U-17 World Cup in Uruguay.

As a member of the Cameroon national U-20 team, she appeared at the 2018 African U-20 World Cup qualification in 2017.

She is part of the Cameroon national team.

== International goals ==
No.	Date	Venue	Opponent	Score	Result	Competition
1.	11 July 2026	Stade Militaire, Yaoundé, Cameroon	Benin	3–1	3–1	Friendly
2.	29 July 2026	Larbi Zaouli Stadium, Casablanca, Morocco	Mali	1–0	2–1	2026 Women's Africa Cup of Nations
3.	29 July 2026	Larbi Zaouli Stadium, Casablanca, Morocco	Mali	2–1	2–1	2026 Women's Africa Cup of Nations
4.	2 August 2026	Moulay Rachid Stadium, Casablanca, Morocco	Ghana	1–0	1–0	2026 Women's Africa Cup of Nations
5.	16 August 2026	Moulay El Hassan Stadium, Rabat, Morocco	Malawi	1–0	3–0	2026 Women's Africa Cup of Nations
6.	16 August 2026	Moulay El Hassan Stadium, Rabat, Morocco	Malawi	3–0	3–0	2026 Women's Africa Cup of Nations

== Career statistics ==
As of match played 17 May 2026.

Club	Season	League			Continental		National		Total	
Club	Season	Division	Apps	Goals	Apps	Goals	Apps	Goals	Apps	Goals
Okzhetpes	2021–22	Kazakhstan Premier League		42	–	–	–	–		42
Lekié	2022–23	Cameroonian Championship	20	23	–	–	–	–	20	23
Hakkarigücü	2023–24	Turkish Super League	22	20	–	–	-	–	22	20
Galatasaray	2024–25	Turkish Super League	17	14	–	–	–	–	17	14
Galatasaray	2025–26	Turkish Super League	25	27	–	–	–	–	25	27
Galatasaray	Total		42	41	–	–	–	–	42	41
Fenerbahçe	2026–27	Turkish Super League	3	4	1	2	–	–	4	6
Career total			87	130	1	2	–	–	88	132

== Personal life ==
Marie Gisele Divine Ngah Manga was born in Cameroon on 20 October 2002.

== Honours ==
=== Club ===
Cameroonian Women's Championship

Lekié
Champions (1): 2022–23

=== International ===
Cameroon

Women's Africa Cup of Nations: 2026

=== Individual ===
Top Goalscorer (2)
42 goals with Okzhetpes (2021–22 Kazakhstan Premier League),
23 goals with Lekié (2022–23 Cameroonian Championship)

Cameroon Ballon d'Or' (1)
2023
