= 2025 Sud Ladies Cup =

6ème Sud Ladies Cup – Tournoi Maurice Revello (in French)

Tournament details
- Host country: France
- Dates: 27 May–3 June 2025
- Teams: 4 (from 3 associations)
- Venue: 1 (in 1 host city)

Final positions
- Champions: France (2nd title)
- Runners-up: Japan
- Third place: Czech Republic
- Fourth place: Morocco

Tournament statistics
- Matches played: 6
- Goals scored: 19 (3.17 per match)
- Top scorer: (France) Vicki Bècho (4 goals)
- Best player: (France) Laurina Fazer
- Best goalkeeper: (Czech Republic) Vanesa Jílková

The 2025 Sud Ladies Cup (officially French: 6ème Sud Ladies Cup – Tournoi Maurice Revello) was the sixth edition of the Sud Ladies Cup women's football tournament. It was held in the department of Vaucluse from 27 May to 3 June 2025.

The defending champions France won their second title after beat Morocco and Japan and draw with Czech Republic.

== Format ==
The four invited teams played a round-robin tournament. The teams were ranked according to points (3 points for a win, 1 point for a draw, and 0 points for a loss). In the event of a draw, the two teams faced each other in a penalty shoot-out, with a bonus point for the winners. If tied on points, head-to-head match would be used to determine the ranking.

== Venues ==
All matches were played in Avignon.

Avignon
Parc des Sports
43.5542°N 4.5042°E
Capacity: 17,518

== Teams ==
Four participating teams were announced on 16 March 2025.

AFC

- Japan (4th participation)

CAF

- Morocco (2nd participation)

UEFA

- Czech Republic (1st participation)
- France (6th participation)

== Match officials ==
The referees were:

Referees
(France) Agathe Kocher
(Japan) Azusa Sugino
(Switzerland) Nadine Reichmuth

Assistant referees
(France) Amira Amdouni	(France) Aurélie Cadinot	(France) Mégane Cartaut
(France) Camille Comba	(France) Lisa Coste	(France) Julie Kerkache
(France) Marion Salemme	(France) Marion Tison	(Japan) Saki Nakamoto
(Japan) Miu Sone	(Panama) Pamela Bernal	(Panama) Katherine Prescod

== Results ==
Pos	Team	Pld	W	D	L	GF	GA	GD	Pts
1	France (H)	3	2	1	0	9	2	+7	7
2	Japan	3	2	0	1	6	4	+2	6
3	Czech Republic	3	1	1	1	4	2	+2	5
4	Morocco	3	0	0	3	0	11	−11	0

Source: Sud Ladies Cup
(H) Hosts

All times are local CEST (UTC+2).

27 May 2025
20:00

France	1–1	Czech Republic
Scannapiéco 21'	Report	Žufánková 26'
Penalties
Diaz (penalty scored); Connesson (penalty scored); Gstalter (penalty missed); Le Guilly (penalty scored); Robillard (penalty scored); Blanc (penalty missed)	4–5	(penalty scored) Ohlídalová; (penalty missed) Obadalová; (penalty scored) Střížová; (penalty scored) Jonášová; (penalty scored) Bláhová; (penalty scored) Jílková

Parc des Sports, Avignon
Referee: Azusa Sugino (Japan)
28 May 2025
20:00

Japan	4–0	Morocco
El Amrani 33' (o.g.); Itamura 45+3'; Satō 65'; Fujisaki 87'	Report

Parc des Sports, Avignon
Referee: Agathe Kocher (France)
30 May 2025
20:00

France	4–0	Morocco
Gstalter 66'; Bècho 79', 88'; Robillard 89'	Report

Parc des Sports, Avignon
Referee: Nadine Reichmuth (Switzerland)
31 May 2025
18:00

Japan	1–0	Czech Republic
Fujisaki 1'	Report

Parc des Sports, Avignon
Referee: Agathe Kocher (France)
2 June 2025
20:00

Czech Republic	3–0	Morocco
Žufánková 8', 33'; Motyčková 90+1'	Report

Parc des Sports, Avignon
Referee: Azusa Sugino (Japan)
3 June 2025
18:00

France	4–1	Japan
Bècho 7', 48'; Fazer 23', 71'	Report	Fujisaki 90+2'

Parc des Sports, Avignon
Referee: Nadine Reichmuth (Switzerland)

== Statistics ==
=== Goalscorers ===
There were 19 goals scored in 6 matches, for an average of 3.17 goals per match.

4 goals

- (France) Vicki Bècho

3 goals

- (Czech Republic) Jana Žufánková
- (Japan) Satoko Fujisaki

2 goals

- (France) Laurina Fazer

1 goal

- (Czech Republic) Adéla Motyčková
- (France) Lola Gstalter
- (France) Camille Robillard
- (France) Dona Scannapiéco
- (Japan) Mao Itamura
- (Japan) Momo Satō

1 own goal

- (Morocco) Oumayma El Amrani (against Japan)

Source: Sud Ladies Cup

== See also ==
- 2025 Maurice Revello Tournament
