= Cathy Biya =

Cameroonian footballer (born 2006)

Catherine Biya
Personal information
- Date of birth: 18 July 2006 (age 20)
- Place of birth: Yaoundé, Cameroon
- Height: 1.66 m (5 ft 5 in)
- Position: Goalkeeper

Team information
- Current team: CD Getafe Femenino
- Number: 1

Senior career*
Years	Team	Apps	(Gls)
2021–2022	AS Awa	-	(0)
2022–2025	Éclair de Sa'a	41	(0)
2025–	Getafe	23	(0)

International career
2023–2024	Cameroon U20	7	(0)
2025–	Cameroon	2	(0)
Medal record
Women's Africa Cup of Nations
Gold medal – first place	2026 Morocco
- * Club domestic league appearances and goals

Catherine Biya (born 18 July 2006) is a Cameroonian professional footballer who plays as a goalkeeper for the Segunda Federación club CD Getafe Femenino and the Cameroon national team.

Biya won the Cameroonian Golden Ball as the tournament's best goalkeeper in the first division of Cameroon women's football league in 2024.

== Biography ==
Catherine Biya was born on July 18, 2006 in Cameroon. She began her career in 2021 with the club AS Awa FC. In 2022, she moved to Éclair de Sa'a. In 2025, she joined the Spanish club CD Getafe Femenino.

== International career ==
She was selected for Cameroon at under-20 levels in 2023. Biya was a member of the squad that participated in the Under-20 World Cup.

In 2023, she participated in the African U20 Games Ghana. That same year, Cathy took part in the South Ladies Cup in Avignon France. And came second in this tournament.

In 2024, Cathy received another call-up for the FIFA U20 Women's World Cup Colombia. That same year, she was nominated by the Confederation of African Football (CAF) as African Goalkeeper of the Year.

In June 2026, She was included in Cameroon's squad for the 2026 Women's Africa Cup of Nations in Morocco and later won the entire tournament for the first time in their history.

== Career statistics ==
=== Club ===
As of match played 24 May 2026

Appearances and goals by club, season and competition
Club	Season	League		Total	
Club	Season	Apps	Goals	Apps	Goals
AS Awa	2021–2022	—	0	—	0
Éclair de Sa'a	2022–2025	41	0	41	0
Getafe B	2025–	23	0	23	0
Career total		64	0	64	0

=== International ===
As of match played 2026

Appearances and goals by national team and year
National team	Year	Apps	Goals
Cameroon	2023	1	0
Cameroon	2026	1	0
Total		2	0

== Honours ==
Cameroon

- Women's Africa Cup of Nations: 2026

Individual

- 2023: Best goalkeeper award at the South Ladies Cup in Avignon, France
- 2025: Prize for best goalkeeper in the Cameroonian Women's Championship at the Cameroon Ballon d'Or
