= Achta Toko Njoya =

Cameroonian footballer (born 2005)

Personal information
- Date of birth: 8 July 2005 (age 21)
- Place of birth: Yaoundé, Cameroon
- Height: 1.60 m (5 ft 3 in)
- Position: Defensive midfielder

Team information
- Current team: Real Madrid B
- Number: 23

Senior career*
Years	Team	Apps	(Gls)
2022–2023	Fille de Sa'a		
2023–2025	Getafe	48	(5)
2025–	Real Madrid B	27	(2)

International career^{‡}
2022	Cameroon U17		
2023–2024	Cameroon U20	7	(1)
2025–	Cameroon	11	(0)
Medal record
Women's football
Representing Cameroon
Women's Africa Cup of Nations
Winner	2026 Morocco
- * Club domestic league appearances and goals as of 12:07, 11 November 2026 (UTC) ‡ National team caps and goals as of 16 August 2026

Achta Toko Njoya (born 8 July 2005) is a Cameroonian professional footballer who plays as a defensive midfielder for Primera Federación club Real Madrid B and the Cameroon national team.

== Club career ==
Toko Njoya played for the football club Fille de Sa'a from the city of the same name in the Guinness Super League, the Cameroonian women's football championship. In the 2023 season, she and her team achieved their best result, finishing second. For the 2023–24 season, Toko Njoya moved to Spain, where she signed with Getafe. With her team, she finished first in Group 2 of the Segunda Federación and was promoted to the Primera Federación, scoring five goals in 26 appearances. In the 2024–25 season, Getafe finished 13th, second to last, and were relegated back to the third division. Toko Njoya did not extend her contract and instead signed a contract with Real Madrid in September 2025, where she initially became part of the squad of the club's B team, which played in the second division.

== International career ==
Toko Njoya captained the Cameroon U17 national team in the 2022 World Cup qualifiers. After two victories against Zambia in the third round, her team was eliminated in the fourth and final round, losing 1–5 on aggregate to Tanzania. In 2024, Toko Njoya was part of the Cameroon U20 national team squad for the U-20 World Cup. At the finals tournament, they reached the round of 16, where they lost 1–3 after extra time to Brazil. Toko Njoya started all four matches and scored a goal in the 2–0 group stage victory against Australia.

On 8 April 2025, Toko Njoya made her debut for Cameroon's senior national team in a friendly match against Morocco. In October 2025, Cameroon were eliminated in the second round of qualification for the 2026 Women's Africa Cup of Nations, losing 3–1 on aggregate to Algeria. Toko Njoya came on as a substitute in the 65th minute of the second leg. However, as the competition was subsequently expanded to 16 teams instead of 12, Cameroon qualified for the 2026 Africa Cup of Nations as one of the four best-ranked second-round losers according to the FIFA World Ranking.

In June 2026, Toko Njoya was included in Cameroon's squad for the 2026 Women's Africa Cup of Nations. Cameroon qualified for the 2027 FIFA Women's World Cup in Brazil and later won the entire tournament for the first time in their history.

== Honours ==
Cameroon

- Women's Africa Cup of Nations: 2026
