= 2022 Sud Ladies Cup =

3ème Sud Ladies Cup – Tournoi Maurice Revello (in French)

Tournament details
- Host country: France
- Dates: 22–28 June 2022
- Teams: 4 (from 2 associations)
- Venue: 1 (in 1 host city)

Final positions
- Champions: United States (2nd title)
- Runners-up: France
- Third place: Mexico
- Fourth place: Netherlands

Tournament statistics
- Matches played: 6
- Goals scored: 16 (2.67 per match)
- Top scorer: (United States) Trinity Byars (3 goals)
- Best player: (France) Laurina Fazer
- Best goalkeeper: (United States) Mia Justus

The 2022 Sud Ladies Cup (officially French: 3ème Sud Ladies Cup – Tournoi Maurice Revello) was the third edition of the Sud Ladies Cup women's football tournament.

It was held in the department of Bouches-du-Rhône from 22 to 28 June 2022. In this season, the tournament was contested by under-20 national teams. The invited teams qualified for the 2022 FIFA U-20 Women's World Cup to be held in Costa Rica from 10 to 28 August 2022. The last champions North Korea were not invited to the 2022 tournament.

United States won their second title after beat France and Mexico and draw with Netherlands.

== Participants ==
Four participating teams were announced on 10 June 2022.

CONCACAF

- Mexico (2nd participation)
- United States (2nd participation)

UEFA

- France (3rd participation)
- Netherlands (1st participation)

== Venues ==
The matches were played in Aubagne.

Aubagne
Stade de Lattre-de-Tassigny
43.2939695°N 5.5623227°E
Capacity: 1,000

== Match officials ==
The referees were:

Referees		Assistant referees		
(France) Siham Benmahammed	(France) Audrey Gerbel	(France) Solène Bartnik	(France) Clothilde Brassart	(France) Camille Daas
(France) Bianca Giuran	(France) Émeline Rochebilière	(France) Violette Le Chevert	(France) Amira Locutura	(France) Jennifer Maubacq

== Format ==
The four invited teams played a round-robin tournament. The teams were ranked according to points (3 points for a win, 1 point for a draw, and 0 points for a loss). In the event of a draw, the two teams faced each other in a penalty shoot-out, with a bonus point for the winners. If tied on points, head-to-head match would be used to determine the ranking.

== Results ==
Pos	Team	Pld	W	D	L	GF	GA	GD	Pts
1	United States	3	2	1	0	8	3	+5	8
2	France (H)	3	2	0	1	4	4	0	6
3	Mexico	3	1	0	2	2	5	−3	3
4	Netherlands	3	0	1	2	2	4	−2	1

Source: Sud Ladies Cup
(H) Hosts

All times are local CEST

22 June 2022
17:00

Mexico	1–0	Netherlands
Frías 90+3'	Report

Stade de Lattre-de-Tassigny, Aubagne
Referee: Bianca Giuran (France)
24 June 2022
21:00

France	1–3	United States
Nassi 50'	Report	Jackson 6'; Byars 52', 90+1'

Stade de Lattre-de-Tassigny, Aubagne
Referee: Audrey Gerbel (France)

26 June 2022
17:00

United States	3–0	Mexico
Albert 14'; Byars 77'; Shaw 85'	Report

Stade de Lattre-de-Tassigny, Aubagne
Referee: Siham Benmahammed (France)
26 June 2022
21:00

France	1–0	Netherlands
Mzé Issa 18'	Report

Stade de Lattre-de-Tassigny, Aubagne
Referee: Émeline Rochebilière (France)

28 June 2022
17:00

United States	2–2	Netherlands
Cooper 5'; Shaw 63'	Report	Noordman 12'; Henry 32'
Penalties
Sentnor (penalty scored); Lageyre (penalty missed); Shaw (penalty scored); Shores (penalty scored); Colton (penalty missed); Patterson (penalty scored); DellaPeruta (penalty scored)	5–4	(penalty scored) Foederer; (penalty missed) Peddemors; (penalty missed) Henry; (penalty scored) Auée; (penalty scored) Koopman; (penalty scored) Van Diemen; (penalty missed) Walk

Stade de Lattre-de-Tassigny, Aubagne
Referee: Siham Benmahammed (France)
28 June 2022
21:00

France	2–1	Mexico
Ould Hocine 34'; Hoeltzel 73'	Report	Ramírez 58'

Stade de Lattre-de-Tassigny, Aubagne
Referee: Émeline Rochebilière (France)

== Statistics ==
=== Goalscorers ===
There were 16 goals scored in 6 matches, for an average of 2.67 goals per match.

3 goals

- (United States) Trinity Byars

2 goals

- (United States) Jaedyn Shaw

1 goal

- (France) Mégane Hoeltzel
- (France) Yrma Mzé Issa
- (France) Jade Nassi
- (France) Célina Ould Hocine
- (Mexico) América Frías
- (Mexico) Alexxandra Ramírez
- (Netherlands) Ziva Henry
- (Netherlands) Danique Noordman
- (United States) Korbin Albert
- (United States) Michelle Cooper
- (United States) Simone Jackson

=== Awards ===
After the final, the following players were rewarded for their performances during the competition.

- Best player: (France) Laurina Fazer
- Best goalkeeper: (United States) Mia Justus
- Topscorer: (United States) Trinity Byars

=== Sud Ladies Cup 2022 best XI ===
The best XI team was a squad consisting of the eleven most impressive players at the tournament.

Pos.	Player
GK	(United States) Mia Justus
DF	(United States) Ayo Oke
DF	(France) Alice Sombath
DF	(Netherlands) Marit Auée
DF	(France) Anaëlle Tchakounte
DF	(Mexico) Alexxandra Ramírez
MF	(France) Laurina Fazer
MF	(Mexico) Jana Gutiérrez
MF	(Netherlands) Ella Peddemors
FW	(United States) Trinity Byars
FW	(United States) Jaedyn Shaw

== See also ==
- 2022 Toulon Tournament
