= 2023 UNCAF Women's U-19 Tournament =

Torneo Sub-19 Femenino UNCAF 2023

Tournament details
- Host country: Honduras
- City: Tegucigalpa
- Dates: 3–12 March 2023
- Teams: 8 (from 1 confederation)
- Venue(s): 2 (in 1 host city)

Final positions
- Champions: El Salvador (1st title)
- Runners-up: Panama
- Third place: Costa Rica
- Fourth place: Honduras

Tournament statistics
- Matches played: 16
- Goals scored: 49 (3.06 per match)
- Top scorer(s): (Honduras) Karla Calix (Panama) Daniela Hincapié (3 Goals each)

the 2023 UNCAF Women's U-19 Tournament is the first edition of the UNCAF Women's U-19 Tournament, the international FIFA's sponsored women's youth football tournament contested by the under-19 national teams of the member associations of the Central American Football Union, the tournament took place in Tegucigalpa, Honduras between 3 and 12 March 2023.

El Salvador won the tournament after beating Panama 4–3 on penalties in the final match.

== Participating nations ==
All UNCAF members associations entered the tournament alongside CFU's Dominican Republic, as preparation for the coming 2023 CONCACAF Women's U-20 Championship qualification.

Team	App	Last	Best placement in the tournament
Belize	1st	—	debut
Costa Rica	1st	—	debut
Dominican Republic ^{Guest}	1st	—	debut
El Salvador	1st	—	debut
Guatemala	1st	—	debut
Honduras	1st	—	debut
Nicaragua	1st	—	debut
Panama	1st	—	debut

== Squads ==
Players born between 1 January 2004 and 31 December 2007 are eligible to compete in the tournament.

== Match officials ==
UNCAF announced a total of 9 referees, 8 assistant referees appointed for the tournament.

Referees

- (Costa Rica) Dannia Sevilla
- (Dominican Republic) Ada Tolentino
- (El Salvador) Daniela Romero
- (Guatemala) Dilla Bradley
- (Guatemala) Genesis De Leon
- (Honduras) Belkis Flores
- (Honduras) Melissa Caballero
- (Honduras) Merlin Vanessa Soto
- (Mexico) Ximena Marquez Ruiz

Assistant referees

- (Cuba) Angellica Peña
- (El Salvador) Elizabeth Aguilar
- (El Salvador) Yoselin Fernandez
- (Guatemala) Seidy Ramirez
- (Honduras) Alejandra Gonzalez
- (Honduras) Vivian Herrera
- (Mexico) Maria Fernanda Avila
- (Nicaragua) Mayling Chavarria

== Group Stage ==
All times are local, CST (UTC-6)

=== Group A ===
Pos	Team	Pld	W	D	L	GF	GA	GD	Pts	Qualification
1	Panama	3	3	0	0	6	1	+5	9	Final
2	Honduras (H)	3	2	0	1	6	4	+2	6	Third place match
3	Guatemala	3	1	0	2	2	5	−3	3	Fifth place match
4	Belize	3	0	0	3	1	5	−4	0	Seventh place match

Source: UNCAF
Rules for classification: Group stage tiebreakers
(H) Hosts
May 2023
11:00

Guatemala	0–1	Panama
		Hincapié 47'

Centro Alto Rendimiento Jose Rafael Ferrari, Tegucigalpa
Referee: Ximena Marquez Ruiz (Mexico)
May 2023
15:10

Honduras	2–0	Belize
Calix 62', 76'

Centro Alto Rendimiento Jose Rafael Ferrari, Tegucigalpa
Referee: Daniela Romero (El Salvador)

7 March 2023
11:10

Belize	1–2	Guatemala
Velasquez 51'		Gonzalez 3'; Polanco 89'

Centro Alto Rendimiento Jose Rafael Ferrari, Tegucigalpa
Referee: Melissa Caballero (Honduras)
7 March 2023
15:10

Honduras	1–4	Panama
Calix 30'		Espino 20'; Hincapié 31', 90+5'; King 37'

Centro Alto Rendimiento Jose Rafael Ferrari, Tegucigalpa
Referee: Dannia Sevilla (Costa Rica)

9 March 2023
11:10

Panama	1–0	Belize
Salazar 68'

Centro Alto Rendimiento Jose Rafael Ferrari, Tegucigalpa
Referee: Merlin Vanessa Soto (Honduras)
9 March 2023
15:10

Honduras	3–0	Guatemala
Rodriguez 66'; Henriquez 81'; Valdez 90'

Centro Alto Rendimiento Jose Rafael Ferrari, Tegucigalpa
Referee: Dannia Sevilla (Costa Rica)

=== Group B ===
Pos	Team	Pld	W	D	L	GF	GA	GD	Pts	Qualification
1	El Salvador	3	3	0	0	8	2	+6	9	Final
2	Costa Rica	3	2	0	1	3	3	0	6	Third place match
3	Dominican Republic	3	1	0	2	3	5	−2	3	Fifth place match
4	Nicaragua	3	0	0	3	1	5	−4	0	Seventh place match

Source: UNCAF
Rules for classification: Group stage tiebreakers
5 March 2023
11:00

Nicaragua	0–1	Dominican Republic
		A. Diaz 56'

Centro Alto Rendimiento Jose Rafael Ferrari, Tegucigalpa
Referee: Dilla Bradley (Guatemala)
5 March 2023
15:00

Costa Rica	0–2	El Salvador
		Ayala 1'; Sanchez 47'

Centro Alto Rendimiento Jose Rafael Ferrari, Tegucigalpa
Referee: Genesis De Leon (Guatemala)

7 March 2023
11:00

El Salvador	3–1	Nicaragua
Velasquez 14'; Rodríguez 48'; Berger 88'		Ad. Munguia 88'

Centro Alto Rendimiento Jose Rafael Ferrari, Tegucigalpa
Referee: Ada Tolentino (Dominican Republic)
7 March 2023
15:00

Dominican Republic	1–2	Costa Rica
Vallecillo 80'		Gonzalez 54'; Roper 73'

Centro Alto Rendimiento Jose Rafael Ferrari, Tegucigalpa
Referee: Merlin Vanessa Soto (Honduras)

9 March 2023
11:00

El Salvador	3–1	Dominican Republic
Sanchez 2'; Guillen 47'; Villatoro 87'		J. Diaz 18'

Centro Alto Rendimiento Jose Rafael Ferrari, Tegucigalpa
Referee: Belkis Flores (Honduras)
9 March 2023
15:00

Costa Rica	1–0	Nicaragua
Agüero 17'

Centro Alto Rendimiento Jose Rafael Ferrari, Tegucigalpa
Referee: Genesis De Leon (Guatemala)

== Placement matches ==
=== 7th Place ===
11 March 2023

Belize	0–3	Nicaragua
		Manzanares 65'; Lopez 85'; Velasquez 87'

Centro Alto Rendimiento Jose Rafael Ferrari, Tegucigalpa
Referee: Ada Tolentino (Dominican Republic)

=== 5th Place ===
11 March 2023

Guatemala	1–3	Dominican Republic
Soto 38'		Jackson 8', 47'; Vallecillo 59'

Centro Alto Rendimiento Jose Rafael Ferrari, Tegucigalpa
Referee: Daniela Romero (El Salvador)

=== 3rd Place ===
11 March 2023

Honduras	1–5	Costa Rica
Rodriguez 28'		Herrera 1', 68'; Gonzalez 33'; Mena 42'; T. Fonseca 58'

Centro Alto Rendimiento Jose Rafael Ferrari, Tegucigalpa
Referee: Dilla Bradley (Guatemala)

=== Final ===
11 March 2023

Panama	3–3	El Salvador
Gil 33'; Espino 83'; Rosas 86'		Ayala 38'; Recinos 45+3'; Villatoro 51'
Penalties
Penalty scored Penalty missed	3–4	(penalty scored) Sanchez; (penalty scored) Rubio; (penalty scored) Ayala; (penalty missed) Rodríguez; (penalty scored) Recinos

Centro Alto Rendimiento Jose Rafael Ferrari, Tegucigalpa
Referee: Ximena Marquez Ruiz (Mexico)

== Goalscorers ==
There were 49 goals scored in 16 matches, for an average of 3.06 goals per match.

3 goals

- (Honduras) Karla Calix
- (Panama) Daniela Hincapié

2 goals

- (Costa Rica) Alexa Herrera
- (Costa Rica) Luciana Gonzalez
- (Dominican Republic) Jazmin Jackson
- (Dominican Republic) Jaylen Vallecillo
- (El Salvador) Carolina Ayala
- (El Salvador) Victoria Sanchez
- (El Salvador) Kelsey Villatoro
- (Honduras) Anyeli Rodriguez
- (Panama) Reggina Espino

1 goal

- (Belize) Khalydia Velasquez
- (Costa Rica) Sianyf Agüero
- (Costa Rica) Tanisha Fonseca
- (Costa Rica) Keishlyn Mena
- (Costa Rica) Samira Roper
- (Dominican Republic) Ariana Diaz
- (Dominican Republic) Jaimaris Diaz
- (El Salvador) Anika Berger
- (El Salvador) Linda Guillen
- (El Salvador) Gabriela Rodríguez
- (El Salvador) Andrea Recinos
- (El Salvador) Karoline Velasquez
- (Guatemala) Karen Gonzalez
- (Guatemala) Dina Polanco
- (Guatemala) Sara Soto
- (Honduras) Susan Henriquez
- (Honduras) Alessandra Valdez
- (Nicaragua) Aneth Lopez
- (Nicaragua) Daniela Manzanares
- (Nicaragua) Adriana Munguia
- (Nicaragua) Elieth Velasquez
- (Panama) Aaliyah Gil
- (Panama) Sherline King
- (Panama) Meredith Rosas
- (Panama) Deysire Salazar
