= Sud Ladies Cup =

- Founded: 2018
- Region: International
- Teams: 4 (2022)
- Current champions: France (2nd title)
- Most championships: France; United States (2 titles each)
- Website: Official website
- 2025 Sud Ladies Cup

The Sud Ladies Cup (officially the Sud Ladies Cup – Tournoi Maurice Revello) is a women's football tournament. The tournament was named after Maurice Revello, who started the Toulon Tournament in 1967 and died in 2016. It is held in the region of Provence-Alpes-Côte d'Azur. Similar to the Toulon Tournament, the tournament is contested by under-20 national teams. In the 2018 tournament, all matches were played in Salon-de-Provence.

United States won the first tournament defeating Germany, Haiti and France.

== Results ==
#	Year	Teams	Winners	Score	Runners-up	Third	Score	Fourth
1	2018	4	United States	Round-robin	France	Germany	Round-robin	Haiti
2	2019	6	North Korea	Round-robin	Japan	France	Round-robin	Mexico
	2020	Cancelled due to the COVID-19 pandemic in France. (Note: The 2020 Sud Ladies Cup was scheduled to be held 19 to 28 May 2020 but it was cancelled on 24 March 2020.)						
	2021	Cancelled due to the COVID-19 pandemic in France.						
3	2022	4	United States	Round-robin	France	Mexico	Round-robin	Netherlands
4	2023	4	Japan	Round-robin	Cameroon	France	Round-robin	Panama
5	2024	6	France	0–0 (4–3 p)	Mexico	Japan	4–2	Morocco
6	2025	4	France	Round-robin	Japan	Czech Republic	Round-robin	Morocco

== Statistics ==
=== Performances by countries ===
Team	Titles	Runners-up
France	2 (2024, 2025)	2 (2018, 2022)
United States	2 (2018, 2022)	
Japan	1 (2023)	2 (2019, 2025)
North Korea	1 (2019)	
Cameroon		1 (2023)
Mexico		1 (2024)

=== Performances by confederations ===
Confederation	Titles	Runners-up
AFC	2 (2019, 2023)	2 (2019, 2025)
UEFA	2 (2024, 2025)	2 (2018, 2022)
CONCACAF	2 (2018, 2022)	1 (2024)
CAF	0	1 (2023)

== Awards ==
Year	Top goalscorer	Player of the tournament	Best goalkeeper
2018	(United States) Sophia Smith (4)	(United States) Sophia Smith	(France) Mylène Chavas
2019	(North Korea) Kim Kyong-yong (5)	(Mexico) Silvana Flores	(North Korea) Yu Son-gum
2022	(United States) Trinity Byars (3)	(France) Laurina Fazer	(United States) Mia Justus
2023	(Cameroon) Brenda Tabe (Japan) Momoko Tanikawa (Japan) Rihona Ujihara (3)	(Japan) Momoko Tanikawa	(Cameroon) Cathy Biya
2024	(Colombia) Daniela Garavito (2)	(Mexico) Natalia Colin	(Mexico) Itzel Velasco
2025	(France) Vicki Bècho (4)	(France) Laurina Fazer	(Czech Republic) Vanesa Jílková

== See also ==
- Maurice Revello Tournament
- Montaigu Tournament
- Torneo di Viareggio
- Granatkin Memorial
- Valeriy Lobanovskyi Memorial Tournament
- Under-20 Four Nations Tournament
- Under 20 Elite League
- UEFA Youth League
- Premier League International Cup
- NextGen Series
- Under-20 Intercontinental Cup
- U-20 Copa Libertadores
- Granatkin Memorial
- Valeriy Lobanovskyi Memorial Tournament
- Under-20 Four Nations Tournament
- Ramón de Carranza Trophy
- Inter-Cities Fairs Cup
- Panda Cup
- UEFA Amateur Cup
- UEFA Regions' Cup
- UEFA Women's Under-16 Development Tournament
- UEFA Women's Under-19 Development Tournament
- International Norte Alentejano Tournament
- Youth Development Cup (Belarus)
- International Kuban Spring Women U-19 Tournament
- "Coppa delle Nazioni - Wikipedia". it.wikipedia.org.
- Torneo delle Nazioni
