= 2023 Sud Ladies Cup =

4ème Sud Ladies Cup – Tournoi Maurice Revello (in French)

Tournament details
- Host country: France
- Dates: 16–21 May 2023
- Teams: 4 (from 4 associations)
- Venue: 1 (in 1 host city)

Final positions
- Champions: Japan (1st title)
- Runners-up: Cameroon
- Third place: France
- Fourth place: Panama

Tournament statistics
- Matches played: 6
- Goals scored: 28 (4.67 per match)
- Top scorer(s): (Cameroon) Brenda Tabe (Japan) Momoko Tanikawa (Japan) Rihona Ujihara (3 goals each)
- Best player: (Japan) Momoko Tanikawa
- Best goalkeeper: (Cameroon) Cathy Biya

The 2023 Sud Ladies Cup (officially French: 4ème Sud Ladies Cup – Tournoi Maurice Revello) was the fourth edition of the Sud Ladies Cup women's football tournament.

It was held in the department of Vaucluse from 16 to 21 May 2023. In this season, the tournament was contested by under-19 or under-20 national teams. The last champions United States would not be invited to the 2023 tournament.

== Format ==
The four invited teams played a round-robin tournament. The teams were ranked according to points (3 points for a win, 1 point for a draw, and 0 points for a loss). In the event of a draw, the two teams faced each other in a penalty shoot-out, with a bonus point for the winners. If tied on points, head-to-head match would be used to determine the ranking.

== Venues ==
All matches were played in Avignon.

Avignon
Parc des Sports
43.5542°N 4.5042°E
Capacity: 17,518

== Teams ==
Four participating teams were announced on 28 March 2023.

AFC

- Japan (2nd participation)

CAF

- Cameroon (1st participation)

CONCACAF

- Panama (1st participation)

UEFA

- France (4th participation)

== Match officials ==
The referees were:

Referees
(France) Élisa Daupeux
(France) Charlène Laur
(Japan) Haruna Kanematsu
(Panama) Yatzuri Muñoz

Assistant referees
(France) Amira Amdouni	(France) Aurélie Cadinot	(France) Mégane Cartaut
(France) Camille Comba	(France) Lisa Coste	(France) Julie Kerkache
(France) Marion Salemme	(France) Marion Tison	(Japan) Saki Nakamoto
(Japan) Miu Sone	(Panama) Pamela Bernal	(Panama) Katherine Prescod

== Results ==
Pos	Team	Pld	W	D	L	GF	GA	GD	Pts
1	Japan (C)	3	3	0	0	14	0	+14	9
2	Cameroon	3	1	1	1	6	7	−1	5
3	France (H)	3	1	1	1	6	11	−5	4
4	Panama	3	0	0	3	2	10	−8	0

Source: Sud Ladies Cup
(C) Champions; (H) Hosts

All times are local CET (UTC+1).

16 May 2023
18:00

Cameroon	0–3	Japan
	Report	Tanikawa 39'; Hiwatari 54'; Kurimoto 64'

Parc des Sports, Avignon
Referee: Charlène Laur (France)
17 May 2023
18:00

France	3–1	Panama
Rossi 11'; Bourgain 24'; Scannapiéco 28'	Report	Pon 30'

Parc des Sports, Avignon
Referee: Haruna Kanematsu (Japan)

19 May 2022
17:00

Japan	4–0	Panama
Sasai 20'; Sakakibara 24'; Ujihara 37'; Nebu 90'	Report

Parc des Sports, Avignon
Referee: Élisa Daupeux (France)
19 May 2022
21:00

France	3–3	Cameroon
Neller 5'; Marques 43'; Haugou 66'	Report	Tabe 45'; Ngaseh Mbele 49'; Essimi Ewoudou 76'
Penalties
Haugou (penalty scored); Marques (penalty scored); Seguin (penalty scored); Sierra (penalty scored); Rossi (penalty scored); Benera (penalty scored); Scannapiéco (penalty scored); Lejeune (penalty scored); Miriel (penalty scored); Neller (penalty missed)	9–10	(penalty scored) Essimi Ewoudou; (penalty scored) Toko Njoya; (penalty scored) Daha Camilla; (penalty scored) Ndjoah Eto; (penalty scored) Tabe; (penalty scored) Maague; (penalty scored) Ngono; (penalty scored) Ngaseh Mbele; (penalty scored) Aboumba; (penalty scored) Biya

Parc des Sports, Avignon
Referee: Yatzuri Muñoz (Panama)

21 May 2022
14:00

Cameroon	3–1	Panama
Tabe 9', 90+3'; Meva 74'	Report	Cargill 39'

Parc des Sports, Avignon
Referee: Haruna Kanematsu (Japan)
21 May 2022
18:00

France	0–7	Japan
	Report	Tanikawa 6', 86'; Sasai 22'; Kurimoto 56'; Ujihara 60', 82'; Ogawa 88'

Parc des Sports, Avignon
Referee: Yatzuri Muñoz (Panama)

== Statistics ==
=== Goalscorers ===
There were 28 goals scored in 6 matches, for an average of 4.67 goals per match.

3 goals

- (Cameroon) Brenda Tabe
- (Japan) Momoko Tanikawa
- (Japan) Rihona Ujihara

2 goals

- (Japan) Yuka Kurimoto
- (Japan) Chinari Sasai

1 goal

- (Cameroon) Marlène Essimi Ewoudou
- (Cameroon) Kiki Meva
- (Cameroon) Bernadette Ngaseh Mbele
- (France) Léa Bourgain
- (France) Pauline Haugou
- (France) Alice Marques
- (France) Chloé Neller
- (France) Fanny Rossi
- (France) Dona Scannapiéco
- (Japan) Moka Hiwatari
- (Japan) Momoko Nebu
- (Japan) Yuki Ogawa
- (Japan) Kotono Sakakibara
- (Panama) Nicole Cargill
- (Panama) Diana Pon

Source: Sud Ladies Cup

=== Top assists ===
2 assists

- (France) Célia Bensalem
- (Japan) Yuko Inose
- (Japan) Momoko Tanikawa

1 assist

- (Cameroon) Naomi Ndjoah Eto
- (Cameroon) Kiki Meva
- (France) Pauline Haugou
- (France) Fanny Rossi
- (France) Madeleine Yetna
- (Japan) Nana Kashimura
- (Japan) Yuka Kurimoto
- (Japan) Momoko Nebu
- (Japan) Yuki Ogawa
- (Panama) Delineth Rivera

=== Discipline ===
1 red card

- (Cameroon) Achta Toko Njoya (against Panama (yellow card) (yellow-red card) )
- (France) Alice Marques (against Japan (yellow card) (yellow-red card) )

2 yellow cards

- (Cameroon) Marlène Essimi Ewoudou
- (Cameroon) Achta Toko Njoya
- (France) Alice Marques
- (Panama) Deysiré Salazar

1 yellow card

- (Cameroon) Clarisse Aboumba
- (Cameroon) Bernadette Ngaseh Mbele
- (Cameroon) Marie Victoire Ngono
- (France) Caroline Devant
- (Japan) Uno Shiragaki
- (Japan) Momoko Tanikawa
- (Panama) Reggina Espino
- (Panama) Sherline King
- (Panama) Meredith Rosas

=== Awards ===
After the final, the following players is rewarded for their performances during the competition.

- Best player: (Japan) Momoko Tanikawa
- Best goalkeeper: (Cameroon) Cathy Biya
- Topscorer: (Cameroon) Brenda Tabe, (Japan) Momoko Tanikawa, and (Japan) Rihona Ujihara

== See also ==
- 2023 Maurice Revello Tournament
