= Camille Robillard =

French footballer (born 2004)

Personal information
- Date of birth: 25 February 2005 (age 21)
- Place of birth: Saint-Nazaire, France
- Height: 1.65 m (5 ft 5 in)
- Position: Forward

Team information
- Current team: Nantes
- Number: 10

Youth career
- 2010–2011: Saint-Aubin Guérande
- 2011–2016: Amicale Saint-Lyphard
- 2016–2022: Nantes

Senior career*
Years	Team	Apps	(Gls)
2022–	Nantes	59	(12)

International career^{‡}
2023–	France U19	8	(5)
2024–	France U20	2	(0)
2025–	France U23	2	(1)
Medal record
Women's football
Representing France
Sud Ladies Cup
Bronze medal – third place	France 2025
- * Club domestic league appearances and goals as of 29 July 2026 ‡ National team caps and goals as of 4 June 2025

Camille Robillard (born 25 February 2005) is a French professional footballer who plays as a midfielder for Première Ligue club Nantes

== Early life ==
Robillard was born in Saint-Nazaire, France, the second of four children born to Hélène and Jérôme Robillard.

== Club career ==
Robillard began playing football at the age of five with Saint-Aubin Guérande, where her father worked. In 2012, she joined Amicale Saint-Lyphard, remaining there until 2016, when she moved to the youth academy of Nantes.

She progressed through Nantes' youth ranks and also spent the 2020–21 season at the Pôle Espoirs of Lycée Brétigny, before making her first-team debut on 18 September 2022 in a Seconde Ligue match against La Roche-sur-Yon.

Ahead of the 2023–24 season, she was promoted to the first team by Nicolas Chabot and quickly established herself as a regular starter. She opened the league campaign by scoring twice in Nantes’ 5–3 victory over ASPTT Albi. She went on to feature in each of the club's remaining 21 league matches, playing a key role in Nantes' historic promotion to the Première Ligue after scoring 10 goals in 22 appearances. She also scored two braces during the campaign, against Metz. and Montauban FCTG.

Robillard made her Première Ligue debut on 21 September 2024 in Nantes' historic 1–0 away victory over Le Havre. She scored her first goal in the competition on 14 December, in a 5–1 defeat to defending champions OL Lyonnes.
