= Sophia Wilson =

American soccer player (born 2000)

- Wilson with the Portland Thorns in 2026

Personal information
- Birth name: Sophia Olivia Smith
- Date of birth: August 10, 2000 (age 26)
- Place of birth: Windsor, Colorado, U.S.
- Height: 5 ft 6 in (1.68 m)
- Position: Forward

Team information
- Current team: Portland Thorns FC
- Number: 9

Youth career
- Arsenal Colorado
- Real Colorado

College career
Years	Team	Apps	(Gls)
2018–2019	Stanford Cardinal	33	(24)

Senior career*
Years	Team	Apps	(Gls)
2020–	Portland Thorns	103	(59)

International career^{‡}
2015–2016	United States U17		
2017–2020	United States U20	25	(21)
2020–	United States	65	(26)
Medal record
Women's soccer
Representing the United States
Olympic Games
Gold medal – first place	2024 Paris	Team
CONCACAF W Championship
Winner	2022 Mexico
CONCACAF W Gold Cup
Winner	2024 United States
- * Club domestic league appearances and goals as of November 5, 2026 ‡ National team caps and goals as of October 13, 2026

Sophia Olivia Wilson (née Smith; born August 10, 2000) is an American professional soccer player who plays as a forward for Portland Thorns FC of the National Women's Soccer League (NWSL) and the United States national team.

Wilson played college soccer for the Stanford Cardinal, which she helped lead to the 2019 national championship. She was picked first overall by the Thorns in the 2020 NWSL College Draft. In 2021, she led the Thorns in scoring on their way to winning the NWSL Shield. In 2022, she led the Thorns to the NWSL Championship and was named the NWSL Most Valuable Player and Championship MVP. She received the NWSL Golden Boot as the league's top scorer in 2023.

Wilson played for the under-17 and under-20 teams before making her senior debut for the United States in 2020. She was named the U.S. Soccer Female Player of the Year in 2022. She scored three goals at the 2024 Paris Olympics, where the United States women's national team (USWNT) won gold. She is regarded as one of the best forwards in the world.

== Early life ==
Born to parents Mollie and Kenny Smith, Wilson was raised in Windsor near Fort Collins, Colorado, with her two older sisters Gabrielle and Savannah. Wilson's father played basketball at the University of Wyoming and her older sister Savannah played basketball at the University of Northern Colorado, where she was the all-time leading scorer.

Wilson's father said he knew when she was 6 years old that she would be a soccer star after watching her dominate a 3-on-3 league. On a car ride to one of her games, she told her father she was going to score ten goals, which she did accomplish. Wilson began playing co-ed soccer as a young child. She played U-6 through U-10 with the Timnath Twisters and U-11 through U-13 with Arsenal Colorado. She won two state cups with Arsenal Colorado in 2012 and 2013.

Wilson attended Fossil Ridge High School in Fort Collins, where she played for the varsity soccer and basketball teams as a freshman. She notched 10 goals and 4 assists in just 8 games and was named First-Team All-Conference. Wilson also played for the varsity basketball team. She played club soccer for Real Colorado and was first called up to the U-14 national team in 2013. With Real Colorado, Wilson and the team finished runners-up at the ECNL National Championship in 2014 and 2016 and finished in fourth place in 2015. As a high schooler, Wilson and her family would frequently drive 3–4 hours from Fort Collins to Denver and back for soccer practice with youth national teams. She earned a call-up to the senior U.S. national team at age 16.

== College career ==
Wilson attended Stanford University where she played for the Cardinal. She finished her abbreviated collegiate career as a two-time Pac-12 Champion and NCAA Champion after just two seasons.

During her freshman season in 2018, Wilson scored 7 goals and recorded 2 assists in 13 appearances. She led the Pac-12 Conference with three game-winning goals and was named to the All-Pac-12 freshman and second teams.

During the 2019 season, Wilson scored 17 goals and provided 9 assists in 21 appearances. She was named to the Hermann Trophy watch list and helped lead the Cardinal to win the 2019 NCAA College Cup. She scored a hat-trick in the semi-final, leading Stanford to defeat the UCLA Bruins. Stanford went on to win the national title via a penalty shootout in the final, with Wilson making her shot in the shootout. Wilson was named the College Cup's Most Outstanding Offensive Player and earned All-Tournament team honors. She was named to the All-Pac-12 second team and tied for the seventh-most goals in Cardinal history despite playing just two seasons.

== Club career ==
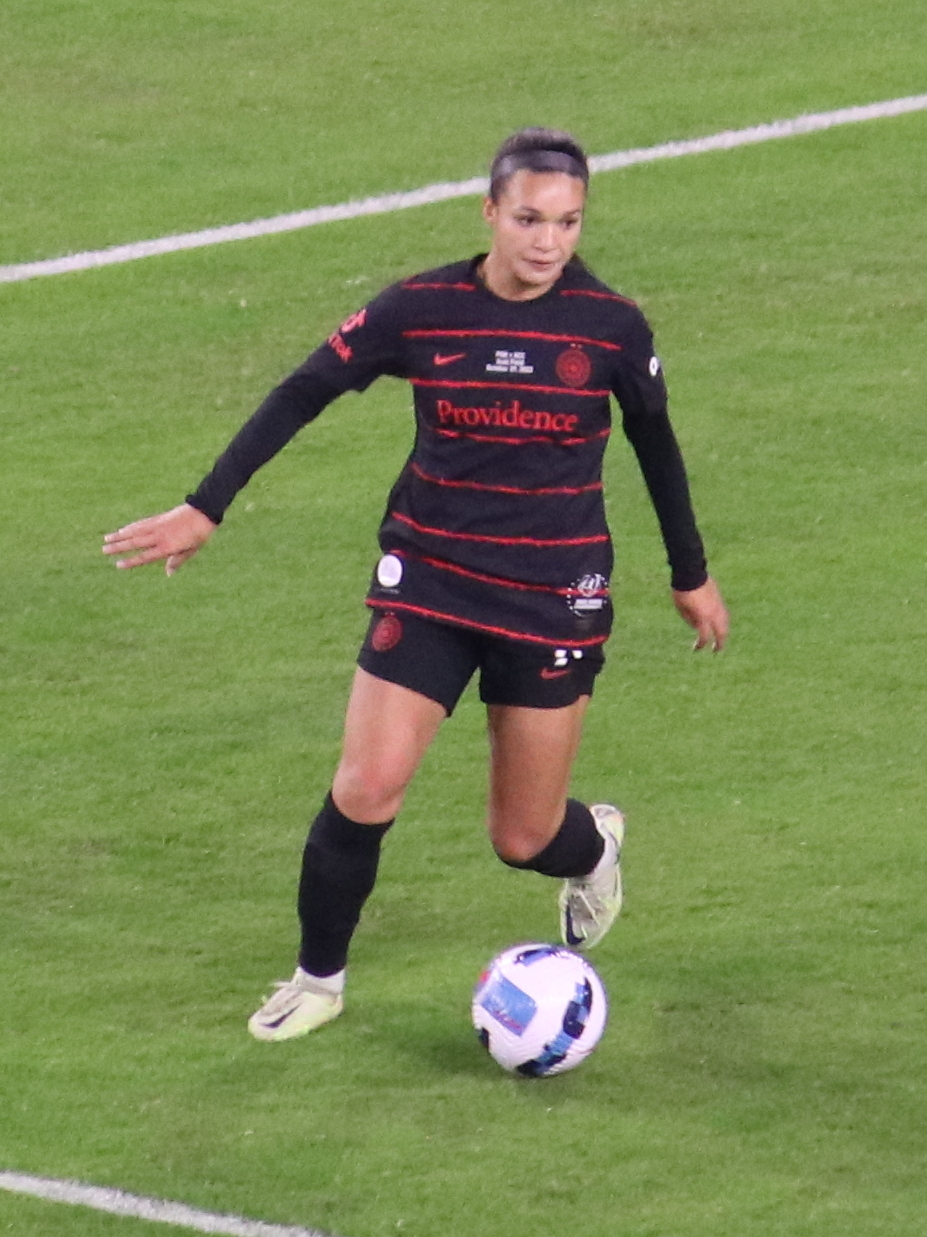
Wilson playing for Portland Thorns FC at the 2022 NWSL Championship.

=== Portland Thorns ===
Wilson was the #1 pick at the 2020 NWSL College Draft and was selected by Portland Thorns FC. Wilson's first season with the Thorns was sidetracked by a foot injury and the COVID-19 pandemic. She made four appearances during the NWSL Fall Series and scored one goal in a 3–0 win against the Utah Royals FC. The Thorns finished in first place and won the NWSL Community Shield with a 3–0–1 (W-L-D) record.

Wilson was a starting forward in 17 of her 22 appearances in the 2021 season and scored seven goals. During her regular season league debut on May 16, 2021, Wilson scored a brace against the Chicago Red Stars in a 5–0 win. Portland finished in first place, winning the NWSL Shield and earning a berth to the NWSL Playoffs, where they were defeated by the Chicago Red Stars in the semi-final.

Wilson scored three goals in five matches in the 2022 NWSL Challenge Cup. She earned league MVP honors for the 2022 NWSL season. The Thorns won the NWSL Championship, with Wilson scoring the first goal in the final, and she was named Championship MVP.

On April 1, 2023, Wilson scored her first professional hat-trick in a 4–1 victory against the Kansas City Current. She was named NWSL Player of the Month for March/April and to the NWSL Best XI of the month. Two months later in June, she was named NWSL Player of the Month for the second time that season after scoring six goals in four matches. Despite a knee injury that kept her out for three games after returning from the 2023 FIFA Women's World Cup, Wilson went on to finish the 2023 season as the league's top scorer. She secured the NWSL Golden Boot after scoring 11 goals in 17 matches, and she was named to the NWSL Best XI for the second time in her career at the conclusion of the season. In 2024 she was signed by the Thorns to a two-year contract extension that made her the highest-paid player in the NWSL.

Having taken maternity leave during the 2025 season, Wilson made her return to play on March 6, 2026, featuring in a 5–1 win over Monterrey. On April 26, she scored her first goal since November 2024, netting the game-winner in a victory over Angel City FC. On October 3, during a 4-2 defeat at home against Boston Legacy, Wilson was shown a red card for pulling the hair of Legacy player Laís Araújo, and was subsequently suspended for two matches by the NWSL Disciplinary Committee. She finished the 2026 season with 15 goals, achieving her personal best, coming in third in the NWSL Golden Boot race, and setting a league record (4) for the number of seasons with 10 or more goals (also 2022, 2023, 2024).

== International career ==
Wilson has competed for the United States on the under-17, under-20, and senior national teams.

Wilson competed at the 2016 FIFA U-17 World Cup. In early 2017, she scored nine goals in six games, which is believed to be a youth national team record for goals in six consecutive games. On March 31, 2017, at age 16, Wilson was called up for the first time to the senior national team for two international friendlies against Russia.

After being a part of the under-20 squad that finished runner-up at the 2018 CONCACAF U-20 Championship, Wilson was named to the USA U-20 roster for the 2018 FIFA U-20 Women's World Cup.

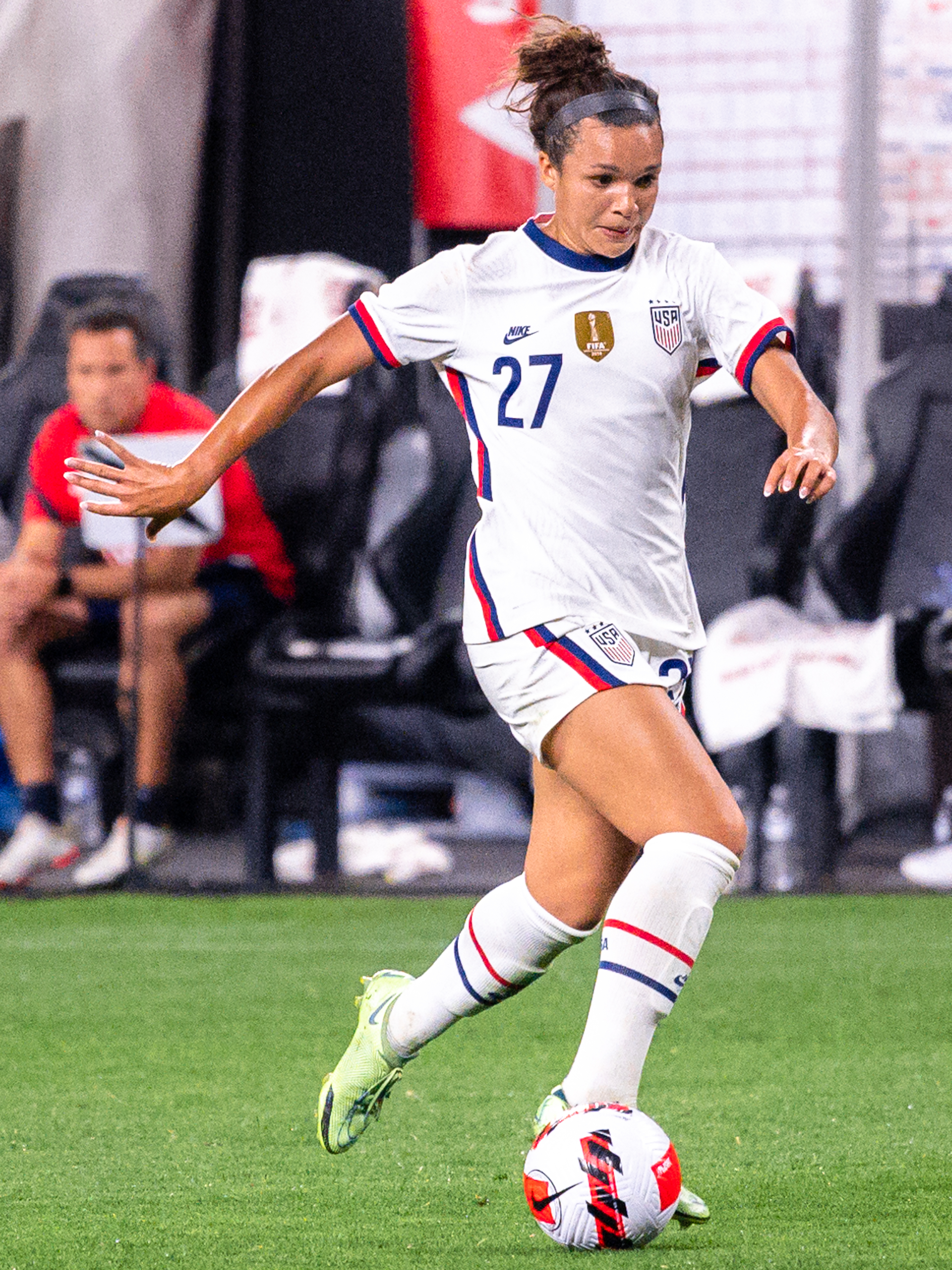
Wilson with the United States in 2021

Wilson was called up to the senior national team for the first training camp of 2020 from January 5 to 15 after having been called into a talent identification camp in December 2019.

On November 27, 2020, Wilson earned her first national team cap in a game against the Netherlands, becoming the first player born in the 2000s to compete for the senior national team.

=== 2023 FIFA Women's World Cup ===
Wilson was named to the U.S. squad for the 2023 FIFA Women's World Cup in Australia and New Zealand. During the team's first group stage match against Vietnam, she scored a brace and provided the assist for the third goal in the team's 3–0 win. Involved in every goal scored, Wilson was named Player of the Match.

In the United States' knockout stage match against Sweden, Wilson played all 90 minutes of regulation time as well as all 30 minutes of extra time. At the end of extra time, with a score of 0–0, the match moved to a penalty shootout. Wilson was the second of three U.S. players who missed penalty shots, ultimately resulting in the U.S. being eliminated from the World Cup.

=== 2024 ===
Wilson was included in the USWNT squad for the 2024 CONCACAF W Gold Cup, which the US won. She scored one goal, against Canada, at the tournament. She was then included in the squad for the 2024 SheBelieves Cup; she scored two goals in the final, which the US also won (in a penalty shootout, with Wilson scoring her shot), and she was named Most Valuable Player of the tournament.

==== 2024 Olympics ====
Wilson was selected to the 18-player roster for the 2024 Summer Olympics in France. She scored a brace in the 4–1 win against Germany in the group stage and scored again on Germany in extra time to win 1–0 in the semifinal. The United States defeated Brazil 1–0 in the final on a goal from Mallory Swanson, securing the gold medal.

== Personal life ==
Wilson met her husband Michael Wilson, an NFL player for the Arizona Cardinals, while they were both at Stanford. She changed her name, including professionally, after they married in January 2025. On March 5, 2025, the couple announced that they were expecting their first child. Their daughter was born in September 2025.

Wilson, along with USWNT stars Mallory Swanson and Trinity Rodman, are known as "Triple Espresso." They gave themselves the name during the 2024 Olympic tournament, where the trio scored 10 of the team's 12 goals en route to winning the gold medal.

== In popular culture ==
=== Print media ===
Wilson was featured on the June 2023 cover of Sports Illustrated along with national teammates Rose Lavelle, Alex Morgan, and Trinity Rodman. She has been featured in Elle, Vogue, and Time magazines.

=== Television and film ===
Wilson co-starred in a commercial for ESPN's SportsCenter starting in January 2023 with Megan Rapinoe and Becky Sauerbrunn. Starting in July 2023, she starred in a Nike, Inc. commercial entitled, "Nice to Beat You". She starred in a Wells Fargo Visa commercial called "Lucky Soccer Socks" and a Chipotle commercial called "Starting Wing" the same month. Ahead of the 2024 Olympics, Wilson appeared alongside Alex Morgan in a commercial for Reese's.

=== Endorsements ===
Wilson has endorsement deals with Nike, Inc., BioSteel Sports Nutrition, Ally Financial, Chipotle, Clif Bar, Hyperice, and Gatorade.

== Career statistics ==
=== Club ===
As of November 1, 2026

Appearances and goals by club, season and competition
Club	Season	League			Cup (Note: Includes the NWSL Challenge Cup)		Playoffs (Note: Includes NWSL Playoffs)		Other		Total	
Club	Season	Division	Apps	Goals	Apps	Goals	Apps	Goals	Apps	Goals	Apps	Goals
Portland Thorns FC	2020	NWSL	—		0	0	—		4 (Note: Includes the NWSL Fall Series)	1	4	1
Portland Thorns FC	2021	NWSL	21	7	3	0	1	0	—		25	7
Portland Thorns FC	2022	NWSL	18	14	5	3	2	1	—		25	18
Portland Thorns FC	2023	NWSL	17	11	2	0	1	0	—		20	11
Portland Thorns FC	2024	NWSL	19	12	—		1	0	1 (Note: Includes the 2024–25 CONCACAF W Champions Cup)	1	21	13
Portland Thorns FC	2025	NWSL	Did not play — maternity leave									
Portland Thorns FC	2026	NWSL	28	15	—		—		—		28	15
Career total			103	59	10	3	5	1	5	2	123	65

=== International ===
As of match played October 13, 2026

Appearances and goals by national team and year
National team	Year	Apps	Goals
United States	2020	1	0
United States	2021	9	1
United States	2022	17	11
United States	2023	11	3
United States	2024	20	9
United States	2025	0	0
United States	2026	7	2
Total		65	26

Scores and results list the United States's goal tally first, score column indicates score after each Wilson goal.

List of international goals scored by Sophia Wilson
No.	Date	Venue	Opponent	Score	Result	Competition	Ref.
1	September 21, 2021	Cincinnati, Ohio	Paraguay	2–0	8–0	Friendly	
2	April 9, 2022	Columbus, Ohio	Uzbekistan	3–0	9–1	Friendly	
3	April 9, 2022	Columbus, Ohio	Uzbekistan	4–0	9–1	Friendly	
4	April 9, 2022	Columbus, Ohio	Uzbekistan	6–0	9–1	Friendly	
5	June 25, 2022	Commerce City, Colorado	Colombia	1–0	3–0	Friendly	
6	June 25, 2022	Commerce City, Colorado	Colombia	2–0	3–0	Friendly	
7	July 7, 2022	Guadalupe, Mexico	Jamaica	1–0	5–0	2022 CONCACAF W Championship	
8	July 7, 2022	Guadalupe, Mexico	Jamaica	2–0	5–0	2022 CONCACAF W Championship	
9	September 3, 2022	Kansas City, Kansas	Nigeria	1–0	4–0	Friendly	
10	September 3, 2022	Kansas City, Kansas	Nigeria	3–0	4–0	Friendly	
11	October 7, 2022	London, England	England	1–1	1–2	Friendly	
12	November 13, 2022	Harrison, New Jersey	Germany	1–1	2–1	Friendly	
13	July 22, 2023	Auckland, New Zealand	Vietnam	1–0	3–0	2023 FIFA Women's World Cup: Group stage	
14	July 22, 2023	Auckland, New Zealand	Vietnam	2–0	3–0	2023 FIFA Women's World Cup: Group stage	
15	December 2, 2023	Fort Lauderdale, Florida	China	1–0	3–0	Friendly	
16	March 6, 2024	San Diego, California	Canada	2–1	2–2 (a.e.t.) (3–1 p)	2024 CONCACAF W Gold Cup	
17	April 9, 2024	Columbus, Ohio	Canada	1–1	2–2 (5–4 p)	2024 SheBelieves Cup	
18	April 9, 2024	Columbus, Ohio	Canada	2–1	2–2 (5–4 p)	2024 SheBelieves Cup	
19	June 4, 2024	Saint Paul, Minnesota	South Korea	2–0	3–0	Friendly	
20	July 13, 2024	Harrison, New Jersey	Mexico	1–0	1–0	Friendly	
21	July 28, 2024	Marseille, France	Germany	1–0	4–1	2024 Summer Olympics: Group stage	
22	July 28, 2024	Marseille, France	Germany	3–1	4–1	2024 Summer Olympics: Group stage	
23	August 6, 2024	Lyon, France	Germany	1–0	1–0	2024 Summer Olympics: Semi-final	
24	October 24, 2024	Austin, Texas	Iceland	3–1	3–1	Friendly	
25	June 6, 2026	São Paulo, Brazil	Brazil	1–0	1–2	Friendly	
26	June 9, 2026	Fortaleza, Brazil	Brazil	1–0	1–0	Friendly	

== Honors and awards ==
Stanford Cardinal

- NCAA Division I Women's Soccer Championship: 2019

Portland Thorns FC

- NWSL Championship: 2022
- NWSL Shield: 2021
- NWSL Challenge Cup: 2021
- NWSL Community Shield: 2020
- Women's International Champions Cup: 2021

United States U20

- CONCACAF Women's U-20 Championship: 2020
- Sud Ladies Cup: 2018

United States

- Summer Olympic Games Gold Medal: 2024
- SheBelieves Cup: 2021, 2022, 2024
- CONCACAF Women's Championship: 2022
- CONCACAF W Gold Cup: 2024

Individual

- US Soccer Female Player of the Year: 2022
- NWSL Most Valuable Player: 2022
- NWSL Championship Most Valuable Player: 2022
- NWSL Best XI: 2022, 2023, 2024, 2026
- NWSL Player of the Month: June 2022, March/April 2023, June 2023
- SheBelieves Cup Most Valuable Player: 2024
- Sud Ladies Cup Best Player: 2018
- Sud Ladies Cup Top Scorer: 2018
- ESPN FC Women's Rank: #5 on the 2024 list of 50 best women's soccer players 2024
- IFFHS Women's World Team: 2024
