= Yasmine Zouhir =

Moroccan footballer (born 2005)

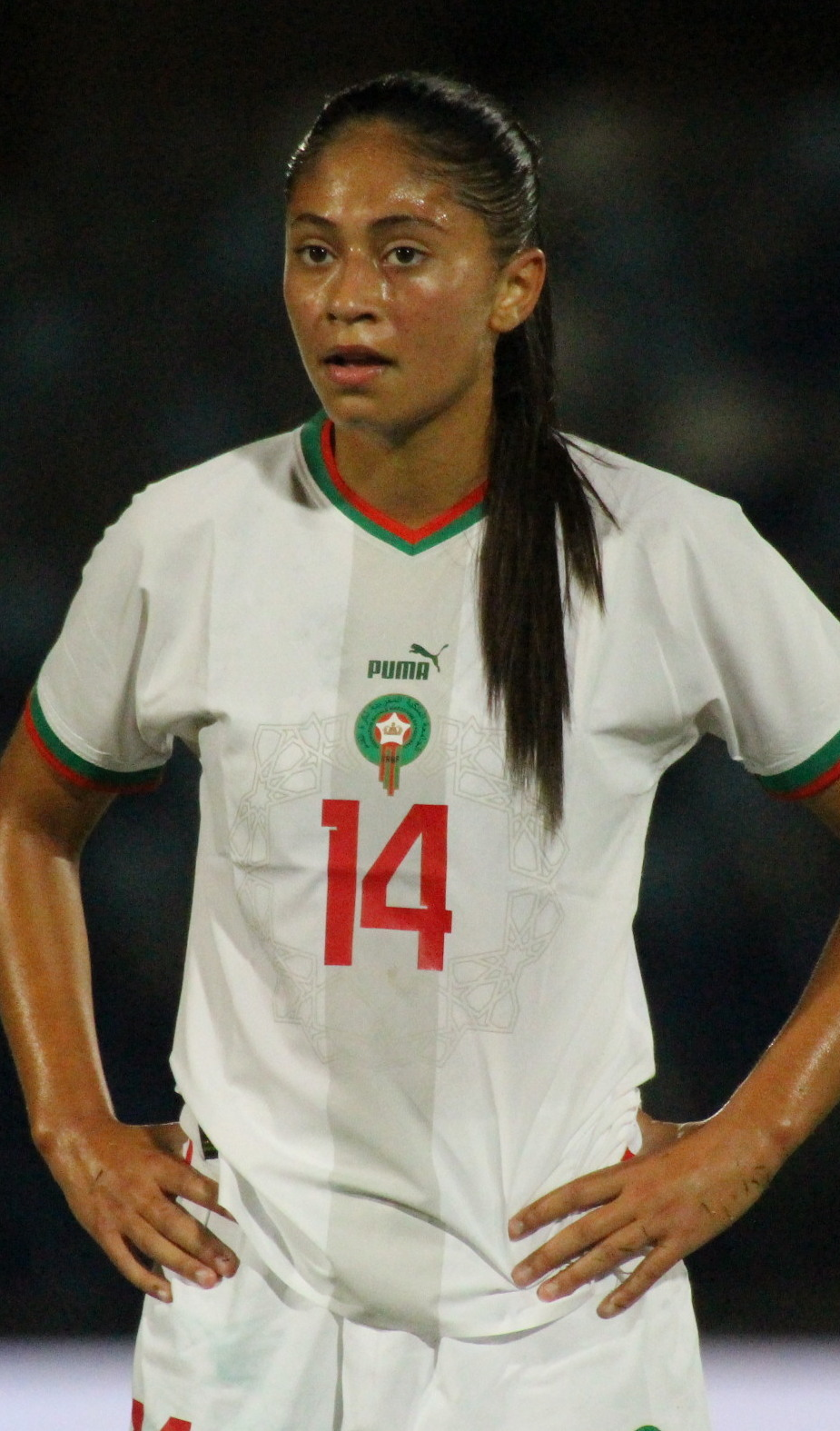
- Zouhir in October 2023

Personal information
- Date of birth: 16 July 2005 (age 21)
- Place of birth: Saint-Priest-en-Jarez, France
- Height: 1.68 m (5 ft 6 in)
- Position: Forward

Team information
- Current team: Real Madrid B
- Number: 18

Senior career*
Years	Team	Apps	(Gls)
2023–2024	Roma	1	(0)
2024–2026	Real Betis	44	(8)
2026–	Real Madrid B	4	(0)
2026–	Real Madrid	2	(0)

International career^{‡}
2022	Morocco U17	12	(6)
2023–	Morocco U20	7	(4)
2023–	Morocco	4	(0)
- * Club domestic league appearances and goals as of 12:13, 11 November 2026 (UTC) ‡ National team caps and goals as of 23:25, 18 July 2022 (UTC)

Yasmine Zouhir (born 16 July 2005) is a professional footballer who plays as a forward for Primera Federación club Real Madrid B. Born in France, she plays for the Morocco national team.

== Club career ==
Born in Saint-Priest-en-Jarez, Yasmine Zouhir was trained at AS Saint-Étienne, where she played in the French Women's Under-19 Championship starting from the year 2021.

She left her training club during the 2023 offseason and moved to Italy, joining AS Roma, which competes in the Serie A. She underwent the summer preparation with the first team and then played with the reserve team (Primavera).

Yasmine Zouhir played her first official match against Fiorentina on September 17, 2023, in the context of the first round of the national Under-19 championship (Primavera). She scored her first goal for AS Roma in a 4–1 victory. She continued her impressive performance in the following match against San Marino Academy, where Roma won convincingly with a score of 10–0. On November 8, she made her debut with the first team of AS Roma, coming off the bench against Cesena in the eighth-finals of the Coppa Italia (victory, 6–0).

On 31 July 2024, Zouhir signed a two-year contract with Liga F side Real Betis. On 17 July 2026, she joined Real Madrid Femenino B.

== International career ==
Zouhir was selected in the Morocco U17 squad for the 2022 FIFA U-17 Women's World Cup.

== See also ==
- List of Morocco women's international footballers
