= Charlène Meyong =

Cameroonian footballer (born 1998)

Personal information
- Full name: Charlène Iverna Meyong Menene
- Date of birth: 19 November 1998 (age 27)
- Place of birth: Cameroon
- Height: 1.70 m (5 ft 7 in)
- Position: Midfielder

Team information
- Current team: Al-Ahli
- Number: 6

Senior career*
Years	Team	Apps	(Gls)
20??–2021	Louves Minproff		
2021–2022	Meizhou Hakka	0	(0)
2022–2024	Reims	26	(2)
2024–2025	London City Lionesses	20	(0)
2025–	Al-Ahli	0	(0)

International career^{‡}
2018–	Cameroon	20	(1)
Medal record
Women's Africa Cup of Nations
Gold medal – first place	2026 Morocco
- * Club domestic league appearances and goals as of 28 April 2025 ‡ National team caps and goals as of 23 April 2025

Charlène Iverna Meyong Menene (born 19 November 1998) is a Cameroonian footballer who plays as a midfielder for Al-Ahli. Having recently played in the Women's Championship club London City Lionesses and the Cameroon women's national team. She represented her country at the 2018 CAF Africa Women's Cup of Nations and 2019 FIFA Women's World Cup.

== Club career ==
=== Louves Minproff ===
Meyong began her footballing career at Cameroonian side Louves Minproff.

=== Meizhou Hakka ===
On 4 March 2021 it was announced that she had joined Chinese Women's Super League side Meizhou Hakka on a one-year contract alongside Nigerian footballer Chinwendu Ihezuo ahead of the 2021 league season.

=== Reims ===
In August 2022 Meyong moved to Europe and joined French club Reims on a 2-year contract.

=== London City Lionesses ===
In July 2024 Meyong joined London City Lionesses on a 2-year contract.

== International career ==
At the 2018 COSAFA Women's Championship, Meyong was part of the Cameroon side which finished second at the tournament after losing 2–1 in the final to hosts South Africa. Meyong scored one goal at the competition. She was subsequently selected as part of the Cameroon squad for the 2018 Africa Women's Cup of Nations at which Cameroon finished in third place following semifinal defeat to Nigeria. Meyong made five appearances at the competition.

In 2019 she appeared twice at the FIFA Women's World Cup in matches against Netherlands and Canada.
