= 2018 Sud Ladies Cup =

1ère Sud Ladies Cup – Tournoi Maurice Revello (in French)

Tournament details
- Host country: France
- City: Salon-de-Provence
- Dates: 5–10 June 2018
- Teams: 4 (from 2 associations)
- Venue(s): 1 (in 1 host city)

Final positions
- Champions: United States (1st title)
- Runners-up: France
- Third place: Germany
- Fourth place: Haiti

Tournament statistics
- Matches played: 6
- Goals scored: 26 (4.33 per match)
- Top scorer(s): (United States) Sophia Smith (4 goals)
- Best player(s): (United States) Sophia Smith
- Best goalkeeper: (France) Mylène Chavas
- Fair play award: France

The 2018 Sud Ladies Cup (officially French: 1ère Sud Ladies Cup – Tournoi Maurice Revello) was the first edition of the Sud Ladies Cup women's football tournament. The tournament was named after Maurice Revello, who started the Toulon Tournament in 1967 and died in 2016.

It was held in the region of Provence-Alpes-Côte d'Azur from 5 to 10 June 2018. All matches were played in Salon-de-Provence. Similar to the Toulon Tournament, the tournament was contested by under-20 national teams.

United States defeated Germany, Haiti and France to sweep all three games and won their first title.

== Participants ==
Four participating teams were announced on 9 April 2018. All they were qualified for 2018 FIFA U-20 Women's World Cup

CONCACAF

- Haiti (1st participation)
- United States (1st participation)

UEFA

- France (1st participation)
- Germany (1st participation)

== Match officials ==
The referees were:

(France) Victoria Beyer

Assistants: Solenne Bartnik and Stéphanie Di Benedetto

(Haiti) Berline Geffrard

Assistants: Falone Dieurisma and Anne-Marie Joseph

(United States) Katja Koroleva

Assistants: Deleana Quan and Felisha Mariscal

== Results ==
| Pos | Team | Pld | W | D | L | GF | GA | GD | Pts |
|---|---|---|---|---|---|---|---|---|---|
| 1 | United States | 3 | 3 | 0 | 0 | 13 | 1 | +12 | 9 |
| 2 | France (H) | 3 | 2 | 0 | 1 | 8 | 3 | +5 | 6 |
| 3 | Germany | 3 | 1 | 0 | 2 | 4 | 6 | −2 | 3 |
| 4 | Haiti | 3 | 0 | 0 | 3 | 1 | 16 | −15 | 0 |

Source: Sud Ladies Cup
(H) Hosts

All times are local CEST

5 June 2018
17:00

| Germany | 0–3 | United States |
|---|---|---|
| | Report | Kim 3'; Smith 23'; Pinto 76' |

Stade d'Honneur Marcel Roustan, Salon-de-Provence
Referee: Victoria Beyer (France)
5 June 2018
19:45

| France | 5–0 | Haiti |
|---|---|---|
| Laurent 21', 34'; Gago 29'; Lakrar 70'; Ringenbach 84' | Report |

Stade d'Honneur Marcel Roustan, Salon-de-Provence
Referee: Katja Koroleva (USA)

7 June 2018
17:00

| United States | 7–0 | Haiti |
|---|---|---|
| Smith 14', 45'; Sanchez 29', 35', 45+1'; Hocking 51'; Gilroy 67' | Report |

Stade d'Honneur Marcel Roustan, Salon-de-Provence
Referee: Victoria Beyer (France)
7 June 2018
19:45

| France | 2–0 | Germany |
|---|---|---|
| Laurent 31'; Pawollek 32' (o.g.) | Report |

Stade d'Honneur Marcel Roustan, Salon-de-Provence
Referee: Berline Geffrard (Haiti)

10 June 2018
15:00

| Haiti | 1–4 | Germany |
|---|---|---|
| Éloissaint 13' | Report | Sanders 7'; Graf 30'; Freigang 65', 80' |

Stade d'Honneur Marcel Roustan, Salon-de-Provence
Referee: Katja Koroleva (USA)
10 June 2018
18:00

| United States | 3–1 | France |
|---|---|---|
| Smith 60'; Gilroy 70'; Hocking 89' | Report | Gago 66' |

Stade d'Honneur Marcel Roustan, Salon-de-Provence
Referee: Berline Geffrard (Haiti)

== Goalscorers ==
26 goals were scored in 6 matches, for an average of 4.33 goals per match.

4 goals

- (United States) Sophia Smith

3 goals

- (France) Emelyne Laurent
- (United States) Ashley Sanchez

2 goals

- (France) Kelly Gago
- (Germany) Laura Freigang
- (United States) Erin Gilroy
- (United States) Penelope Hocking

1 goal

- (France) Maëlle Lakrar
- (France) Océane Ringenbach
- (Germany) Luca Maria Graf
- (Germany) Stefanie Sanders
- (Haiti) Roseline Éloissaint
- (United States) Abi Kim
- (United States) Brianna Pinto

Own goal

- (Germany) Tanja Pawollek (playing against France)

== Awards ==
After the final, the following players were rewarded for their performances during the competition.

- Best player: (United States) Sophia Smith
- Best goalkeeper: (France) Mylène Chavas
- Topscorer: (United States) Sophia Smith
- Fair play: France

== See also ==
- 2018 Toulon Tournament
