= Vicki Bècho =

French footballer (born 2003)

Personal information
- Full name: Vicki Jessy Bècho Desbonne
- Date of birth: 3 October 2003 (age 23)
- Place of birth: Montreuil, France
- Height: 1.68 m (5 ft 6 in)
- Position: Forward

Team information
- Current team: Lyon
- Number: 7

Youth career
- 2011–2015: SC Malay-le-Grand
- 2015–2016: FC Sens
- 2016–2020: Paris Saint-Germain
- 2020: Lyon

Senior career*
Years	Team	Apps	(Gls)
2020	Paris Saint-Germain	0	(0)
2020–	Lyon	72	(17)
2021–2022	→ Reims (loan)	13	(1)

International career^{‡}
2019	France U16	5	(3)
2019–2020	France U17	4	(2)
2019–2022	France U19	11	(5)
2019–2022	France U20	12	(3)
2022–	France U23	20	(9)
2023–	France	21	(2)
Medal record
Women's football
Representing France
UEFA Women's Nations League
Runner-up	2024
UEFA Women's Under-19 Championship
Winner	2019 Scotland
- * Club domestic league appearances and goals as of 28 March 2026 ‡ National team caps and goals as of 10 October 2026

Vicki Jessy Bècho Desbonne (born 3 October 2003) is a French professional footballer who plays as a forward for Première Ligue club Lyon and the France national team.

== Early life ==
Vicki Jessy Bècho Desbonne was born on 3 October 2003 and grew up in Montreuil, France.

Bècho first started playing football in secret, as her mother did not approve of girls playing football. One day her aunt took her mother to watch her play and she was so impressed that she was happy to let her continue. Her idols were Cristiano Ronaldo and Lucho González. She would watch videos of Ronaldo before a match, and had a pair of Gonzalez' signed boots.

== Club career ==
Bècho played for SC Malay de Grand after being spotted by Ali Ben Ahmed, a coach at the club. She played until the U12 category and then joined FC Sens in 2015, joining the U13s. Then, in 2016, at 15, Becho joined the Paris Saint-Germain Academy.

She signed for Lyon from Paris Saint-Germain in 2020.

She signed on loan to Reims in 2021.

Bècho scored her first goal for Lyon in a Coupe de France match against Rodez on 7 January 2023.

== International career ==
Bècho was called up for qualifiers for the 2019 UEFA Women's Under-17 Championship, playing all three matches and scoring against Northern Ireland and the Czech Republic. In the same year, she scored three goals for France at the 2019 UEFA Women's Under-19 Championship, including one against Norway and a brace to help France beat Spain in extra time in the semi-finals. She was the first 15-year-old to score at the tournament since Ada Hegerberg in 2011.

Bècho was also called up for 2022 UEFA Women's Under-19 Championship qualification, playing against Greece and the Republic of Ireland, scoring against the latter. She then represented France at the 2022 FIFA U-20 Women's World Cup, where she was named player of the match for their last group stage game against Korea Republic.

Bècho was one of three Lyon players called up to the France under-23 squad for two friendly matches against the United States in February 2023.

Bècho was named to the French team for the 2023 FIFA Women's World Cup, and was the youngest player in the squad. She made her senior international debut at the tournament, coming on as a substitute in the 66th minute in a scoreless draw against Jamaica on 23 July. She set up Eugénie Le Sommer's goal against Morocco in the round of 16. On 2 August she scored in Les Bleues' winning match against Panama. She was named by FIFA as one of the tournament's "rising stars", along with the likes of Lauren James, Linda Caicedo, and Esmee Brugts, who had "created a lasting impact on the tournament". Despite hitting the post in her 12th spot kick in an extended penalty shoot-out (Australia-France 7-6), Bècho was praised for her performance "blazing a trail down [the] right hand side"

In July 2024, Becho was named in France's squad for the 2024 Olympics.

=== International goals ===
No.	Date	Venue	Opponent	Score	Result	Competition
1.	2 August 2023	Sydney Football Stadium, Sydney, Australia	Panama	6–3	6–3	2023 FIFA Women's World Cup
2.	16 July 2024	Páirc Uí Chaoimh, Cork, Ireland	Republic of Ireland	1–2	1–3	UEFA Women's Euro 2025 qualifying

== Style of play ==
Before France's 2023 World Cup game against Australia on 13 August, Bècho was named by The Guardian football journalist Jack Snape as one of "four France players who can break Australian hearts at the World Cup", along with Renard, Diani, and Le Sommer.

== Personal life ==
Bècho and teammate in the national team Laurina Fazer are almost inseparable friends, and are nicknamed "Tic et Tac" on account of their closeness.

== Honours ==
PSG In February 2020, Bècho won the first ever Women's Golden Titi, an honorary trophy for rewarding the best player at the PSG training center.

Other honours awarded while she was at PSG were:

- Coupe de France Féminine (2019/20)
- UEFA Women's Champions League (2019/20)

Lyon

- Division 1 Féminine (runners up, 2020/21)
- Women's International Champions Cup (runners up, 2021) (2022)

France

- UEFA Women's Under-19 Championship (2019)
- Sud Ladies Cup (runners up, 2022)
