= Alexxandra Ramírez =

Mexican footballer (born 2002)

- Ramírez in 2021

Personal information
- Full name: Alexxandra Ramírez Flores
- Date of birth: 23 May 2002 (age 24)
- Place of birth: Durango City, Durango, Mexico
- Height: 1.66 m (5 ft 5 in)
- Position: Winger

Senior career*
Years	Team	Apps	(Gls)
2018–2024	Santos Laguna	171	(27)
2024–2026	Guadalajara	15	(0)
2025–2026	→ León (loan)	12	(0)

International career
2021–2022	Mexico U20		
- * Club domestic league appearances and goals as of 9 February 2026

Alexxandra Ramírez Flores (born 23 May 2002), is a Mexican professional football Winger.

== Career ==
Ramírez began playing for Santos Laguna during the closing season of Liga MX Femenil. In 2024 she was transferred to Guadalajara.

== International career ==
As of 2021 Ramírez also played for the Mexico women's national under-20 football team and was selected for the 2022 FIFA U-20 Women's World Cup.
