= Laurina Fazer =

French footballer (born 2003)

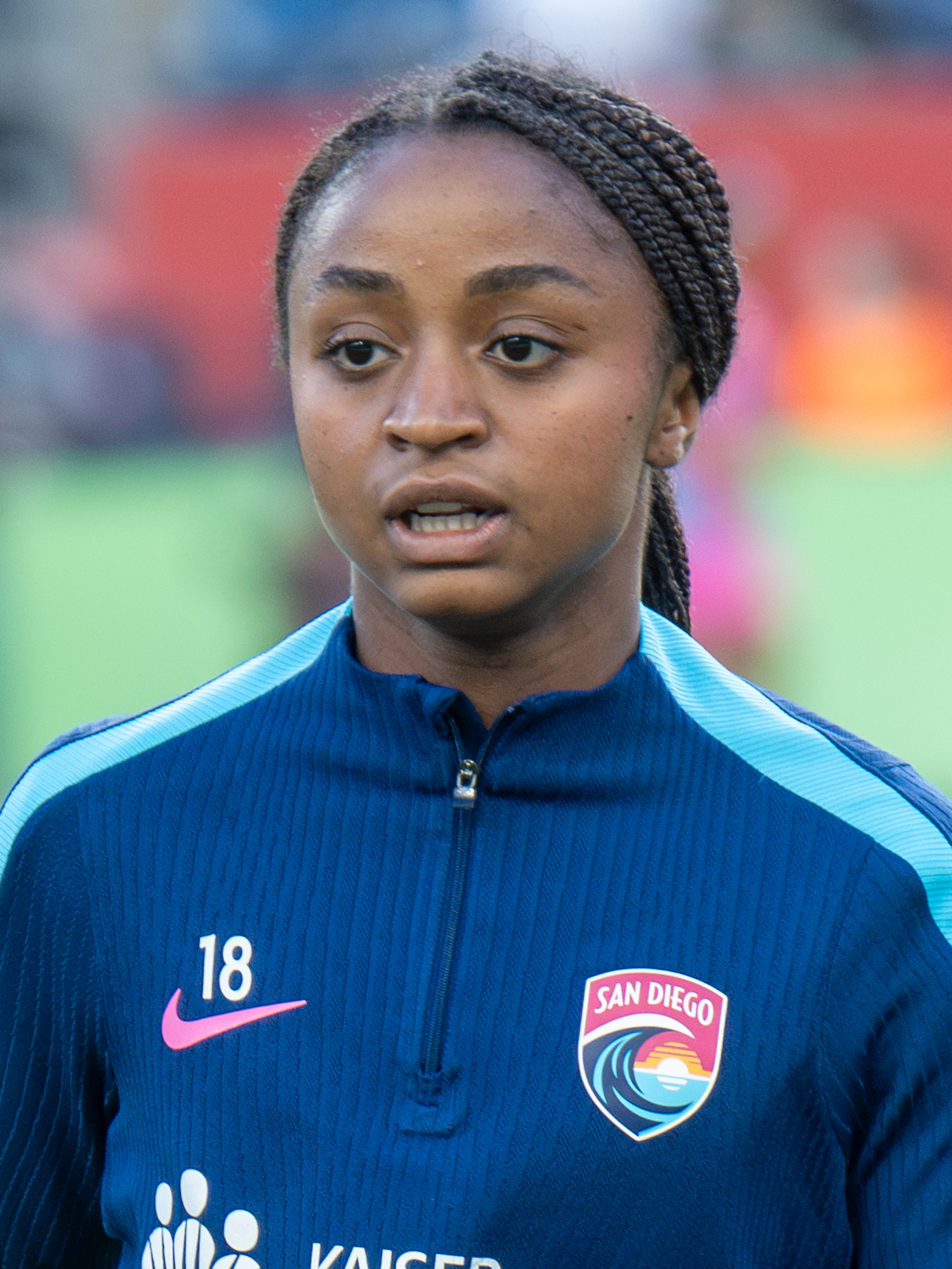
- Fazer with the San Diego Wave in 2026

Personal information
- Full name: Laurina Monique Fazer
- Date of birth: 13 October 2003 (age 23)
- Place of birth: Argenteuil, France
- Height: 1.65 m (5 ft 5 in)
- Position: Midfielder

Team information
- Current team: San Diego Wave
- Number: 18

Youth career
- 2009–2010: ASC Val d'Argenteuil
- 2010–2021: Paris Saint-Germain

Senior career*
Years	Team	Apps	(Gls)
2020–2025	Paris Saint-Germain	67	(1)
2025–	San Diego Wave	33	(0)

International career^{‡}
2019	France U16	2	(0)
2019–2020	France U17	5	(4)
2021–2022	France U19	6	(0)
2022	France U20	8	(1)
2023–	France U23	16	(4)
2023–	France	5	(0)
Medal record
Women's football
Representing France
UEFA Women's Nations League
Third place	2025
- * Club domestic league appearances and goals as of 16:41, 15 November 2026 (UTC) ‡ National team caps and goals as of 18 April 2026

Laurina Monique Fazer (born 13 October 2003) is a French professional footballer who plays as a midfielder for San Diego Wave FC of the National Women's Soccer League (NWSL) and the France national team.

== Club career ==
=== Paris Saint-Germain ===
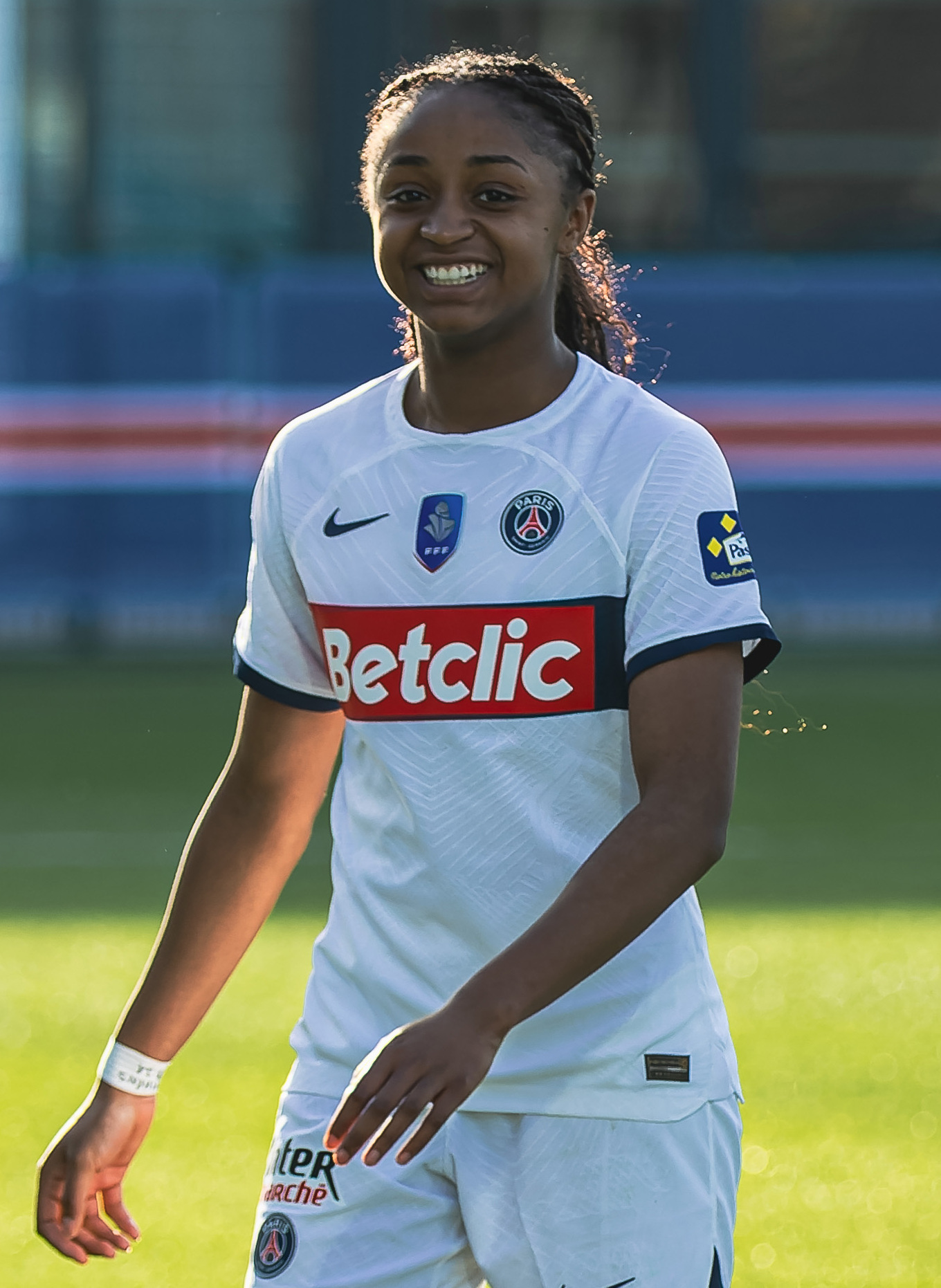
Fazer with Paris Saint-Germain in 2024

Fazer is a youth academy graduate of Paris Saint-Germain. She joined the club in 2010 from ASC Val d'Argenteuil at the age of six. On 18 June 2020, she signed her first professional contract with the club until June 2023.

Fazer made her official debut for the club on 14 November 2020 in a 14–0 league win against Issy. She scored her first goal for the club on 8 December 2021 in a 6–0 UEFA Women's Champions League win against Zhytlobud-1 Kharkiv.

Fazer won UNFP Première Ligue Young Player of the Year award in both 2021–22 and 2022–23 seasons. On 3 July 2023, she signed a two-year contract extension with the club until June 2025.

=== San Diego Wave ===
On 29 July 2025, Fazer joined NWSL club San Diego Wave on a contract through the 2027 season. She made her Wave debut on 16 August, coming on as a second-half substitute for Gia Corley in a 2–1 victory over Bay FC. Two weeks later, she recorded her first NWSL start, playing 45 minutes in a scoreless draw with Seattle Reign FC. Fazer totaled 9 appearances in her first season with San Diego as the Wave finished in sixth and advanced to the playoffs. She played the entirety of the Wave's quarterfinal defeat to the Portland Thorns on 9 November 2025.

== International career ==
Fazer is a French youth international. In July 2022, she captained the French team at the 2022 FIFA U-20 Women's World Cup.

Fazer has also played for the French under-23 squad. scored against Netherlands on 26 October 2023, netting a penalty in the 85th minute. She was the captain of the side during that match, and also during the match against Sweden a few days later.

In September 2022, Fazer received her first call-up to the France national team. She made her international debut against Colombia in a friendly match on 7 April 2023.

Fazer was named in the 26-player preliminary squad, announced on 6 June 2023, for the 2023 FIFA Women's World Cup. She was named in the final 23-player squad announced on 4 July 2023.

== Personal life ==
Born in mainland France, Fazer is of Guadeloupean descent through her father and Malagasy descent through her mother. She is extremely close with her teammate Vicki Bècho, being nicknamed "Tic et Tac" on account of their closeness.

== Career statistics ==
=== Club ===
As of 23 November 2025

Appearances and goals by club, season and competition
Club	Season	League			Cup		Continental		Other		Total	
Club	Season	Division	Apps	Goals	Apps	Goals	Apps	Goals	Apps	Goals	Apps	Goals
Paris Saint-Germain	2020–21	Première Ligue	6	0	0	0	2 (Note: Appearances in UEFA Women's Champions League)	0	—		8	0
Paris Saint-Germain	2021–22	Première Ligue	10	0	3	0	7	1	—		20	1
Paris Saint-Germain	2022–23	Première Ligue	17	1	5	0	6	0	0	0	28	1
Paris Saint-Germain	2023–24	Première Ligue	15	0	4	0	5	0	1 (Note: Appearance in Trophée des Championnes)	0	25	0
Paris Saint-Germain	2024–25	Première Ligue	19	0	3	0	2	0	2 (Note: Appearances in playoffs)	0	26	0
Paris Saint-Germain	Total		67	1	15	0	22	1	3	0	107	2
San Diego Wave	2025	NWSL	9	0	—		—		1 (Note: Appearances in the NWSL playoffs)	0	10	0
Career total			76	1	15	0	22	1	4	0	117	2

=== International ===
As of match played 18 April 2026

Appearances and goals by national team and year
National team	Year	Apps	Goals
France	2023	3	0
France	2025	1	0
France	2026	1	0
Total		5	0

== Honours ==
Paris Saint-Germain

- Première Ligue: 2020–21
- Coupe de France Féminine: 2021–22, 2023–24

Individual

- UNFP Première Ligue young player of the year: 2021–22, 2022–23
- Sud Ladies Cup Best Player: 2022
- Sud Ladies Cup Best XI: 2022
