= Claudia Dabda =

Cameroonian footballer (born 2001)

Personal information
- Full name: Claudia Voulania Dabda
- Date of birth: 1 July 2001 (age 25)
- Place of birth: Yaoundé, Cameroon
- Height: 1.73 m (5 ft 8 in)
- Position: Defender

Team information
- Current team: Al Hilal
- Number: 17

Senior career*
Years	Team	Apps	(Gls)
–2019	ASFF Diamaré		
2020–2023	Dinamo Minsk	80	(9)
2023	Toulouse	7	(0)
2023–	Al Hilal	4	(2)

International career^{‡}
2016–2018	Cameroon U17	5	(1)
2021–	Cameroon	10	(0)
Medal record
Women's Africa Cup of Nations
Gold medal – first place	2026 Morocco
- * Club domestic league appearances and goals as of 16 November 2023 ‡ National team caps and goals as of 16 November 2023 (UTC)

Claudia Voulania Dabda (born 1 July 2001) is a Cameroonian professional footballer who plays as defender for Saudi Women's Premier League club Al Hilal and the Cameroon women's national football team.

== Club career ==
=== Dinamo Minsk: 2020–2023 ===
On 29 April 2020, Dabda joined Dinamo Minsk in Belarus's Women's Premier League. She was the second African signing by the club following the capture of South Africa defender Bambanani Mbane in February.

Dabda played a big role in Dinamo Minsk's historic victory in the Premier League in 2020, securing the club's first-ever title. Notably, she continued her contribution as Dinamo Minsk claimed the championship for the following two seasons. Dabda made 66 appearances and scored 8 goals.

=== Toulouse: 2023 ===
In January 2023, Dabda signed with French side Toulouse on a six-month deal. Dabda joined Toulouse with the aim of steering the club clear of relegation, given their position second-to-last in the standings. Despite her efforts and the team's accomplishment of securing three draws and two wins, Toulouse, faced relegation to Division 3.

=== Al Hilal: 2023–present ===
In August 2023, Dabda signed with Saudi club Al Hilal. she marked her debut for the club during the Saudi-Jordanian Club Championship held in Jordan from August 23 to 27, 2023.

Dabda scored a brace in a 4–3 defeat to Al Nassr in the Capital derby. making her the first Cameroonian to score in the league.

== International career ==
Dabda received her debut senior cap in the 2022 Women's Africa Cup of Nations qualification match against Central African Republic in October 2021.

Dabda was a part of Cameroon U17 squad for 2016 FIFA U-17 Women's World Cup and 2018 FIFA U-17 Women's World Cup.

== Career statistics ==
As of match played 16 November 2023

Appearances and goals by club, season and competition
Club	Season	League			Cup		Continental		Other		Total	
Club	Season	Division	Apps	Goals	Apps	Goals	Apps	Goals	Apps	Goals	Apps	Goals
Dinamo Minsk	2020	D1	22	3	2	0	—		—		6	1
Dinamo Minsk	2021	D1	24	5	4	1	2	0	—		9	0
Dinamo Minsk	2022	D1	20	0	4	0	2	0	—		9	0
Dinamo Minsk	Total		66	8	10	1	4	0	—		80	9
Toulouse	2022–23	D2	7	0	—		—		—		7	0
Al Hilal	2023–24	PL	7	3	2	0	—		3	0	12	3
Career total			80	11	12	1	4	0	3	0	99	12

As of match played 16 November 2023

Appearances and goals by national team and year
National team	Year	Apps	Goals
Cameroon	2021	2	0
Cameroon	2022	6	0
Cameroon	2023	2	0
Total		8	0

== Honours ==
Dinamo Minsk

- Belarusian Premier League: 2020, 2021, 2022
- Belarusian Women's Cup: 2020, 2021, 2022
