= AS Awa =

Cameroonian women's football team

- Full name: Association Sportive Awa
- Founded: 2014; 11 years ago
- President: Thomas Awa
- Coach: Hassan Balla
- League: Cameroonian Women's Championship

Association Sportive Awa is a Cameroonian women's association football club founded in 2014 by local businessman Thomas Awa and based in Yaoundé that competes in the Cameroonian Women's Championship, the top division of Cameroonian women's football, since 2017 with its first title win coming the following year, i.e. 2018.

In fierce competition with the country's two main clubs, Louves Minproff and Amazones FAP, both of which were state-sponsored, AS Awa regained its title in 2021 and consequently qualified for the qualification procedures for the following year's CAF Women's Champions League.

== Honours ==
Type	Competition	Titles	Winning Seasons	Runners-up
Domestic	Cameroonian Women's Championship	3	2018, 2021, 2022	2020
Domestic	Cameroonian Women's Cup	0		

== See also ==
- Cameroonian Women's Championship
- Cameroonian Women's Cup
- CAF Women's Champions League
