= Panama women's national under-20 football team =

Youth football team

Panama Women's U-20
- Nickname(s): Las Canaleras (The Canal Girls); La Marea Roja (The Red Tide)
- Association: Federación Panameña de Fútbol
- Confederation: CONCACAF
- Head coach: Natalia Gutiérrez
- Captain: Desyre Salazar
- Home stadium: Estadio Rommel Fernández
- FIFA code: PAN
| First colours | Second colours |

First international
- Panama 8–0 Nicaragua (Panama City, Panama; 20 March 2002)

Biggest win
- Bahamas 0-13 Panama (Willemstad, Curaçao; 16 April 2023; Bonaire 0-13 Panama (Santo Domingo, Dominican Republic; 23 February 2025

Biggest defeat
- Mexico 10–0 Panama (Veracruz, Mexico; 18 January 2006)

FIFA U-20 Women's World Cup
- Appearances: 0

CONCACAF Women's U-20 Championship
- Appearances: 7 (first in 2002)
- Best result: Quarter-finals (2022)

The Panama women's national under-20 football team is the national U-20 women's football team of Panama and is managed by the Panamanian Football Federation. The U-20 team represents Panama in the CONCACAF Women's U-20 Championship and FIFA U-20 Women's World Cup

== Players ==
The following squad were announced recently to compete 2023 CONCACAF Women's U-20 Championship.

| No. | Pos. | Player | Date of birth (age) | Club |
|---|---|---|---|---|
| 1 | GK | Alejandra Garay | 30 June 2005 (aged 17) | (Panamanian Football Federation) Chorrillo FC |
| 12 | GK | Maritza Valdés | 29 January 2005 (aged 18) | (Panamanian Football Federation) Sporting SM |
| 21 | GK | Judith Robles | 30 June 2005 (aged 17) | (Panamanian Football Federation) Academia CIEX |
| 16 | DF | Mireilis Rojas | 19 September 2005 (aged 17) | (Panamanian Football Federation) Chorrillo FC |
| 2 | DF | Génesis Pinto | 29 August 2005 (aged 17) | (Panamanian Football Federation) Mario Méndez FC |
| 3 | DF | Josselyn Montenegro | 9 August 2005 (aged 17) | (Panamanian Football Federation) Deportivo Chiriquí F.C. |
| 4 | DF | Dayane Madrid | 31 March 2005 (aged 17) | (Panamanian Football Federation) Sporting SM |
| 5 | DF | Meredith Rosas | 29 September 2005 (aged 17) | (Panamanian Football Federation) Sporting SM |
| 14 | DF | Amayah Singleton | 3 June 2005 (aged 17) | (United States Soccer Federation) Wake FC |
| 20 | DF | Luciana Ortega | 29 September 2005 (aged 17) | (Brazilian Football Confederation) Santos FC |
| 10 | MF | Reggina Espino | 2 July 2005 (aged 17) | (Panamanian Football Federation) Sporting SM |
| 6 | MF | Desyré Salazar | 4 May 2004 (aged 18) | (Panamanian Football Federation) Tauro F.C. |
| 8 | MF | Delineth Rivera | 29 July 2005 (aged 17) | (Panamanian Football Federation) Sporting SM |
| 15 | MF | Sara Nieto | 22 November 2003 (aged 19) | (Panamanian Football Federation) Sporting SM |
| 7 | MF | Sherline King | 25 September 2005 (aged 17) | (Panamanian Football Federation) Tauro F.C. |
| 11 | MF | Aaliyah Gil | 1 January 2005 (aged 18) | (Panamanian Football Federation) Tauro F.C. |
| 13 | MF | Ninelys Castrellón | 1 January 2005 (aged 18) | (Panamanian Football Federation) Deportivo Chiriquí F.C. |
| 17 | MF | Amanda Goldstein | 28 May 2005 (aged 17) | (United States Soccer Federation) Fram SC |
| 15 | MF | Marissa Gross | 1 January 2005 (aged 18) | (United States Soccer Federation) Dallas Texans |
| 19 | MF | Aida Name | 1 January 2005 (aged 18) | (United States Soccer Federation) FC Stars |
| 18 | FW | Ana Quintero | 17 March 2005 (aged 17) | (Panamanian Football Federation) Sporting SM |
| 9 | FW | Daniela Hincapié | 5 December 2005 (aged 17) | (Panamanian Football Federation) CA Independiente |

== Fixtures and results ==
Legend

Win Draw Loss Fixture

=== 2023 ===
| 5 March 2023 2023 UNCAF Women's U-19 Championship | Guatemala | 0–1 | Panama | Tegucigalpa, Honduras |
| 11:00 | | Report | D. Hincapié 47' | Stadium: Centro Alto Rendimiento de Olimpia; Referee: Ximena Márquez (Mexico) |

| 7 March 2023 2023 UNCAF Women's U-19 Championship | Honduras | 1–4 | Panama | Tegucigalpa, Honduras |
| 16:10 | | Report | D. Hincapié (-); R. Espino; S. King | Stadium: Centro Alto Rendimiento de Olimpia; Referee: Dannia Sevilla (Mexico) |

| 9 March 2023 2023 UNCAF Women's U-19 Championship | Panama | 1–0 | Belize | Tegucigalpa, Honduras |
| 12:10 | D. Salazar 68' | Report | | Stadium: Centro Alto Rendimiento de Olimpia; Referee: Dannia Sevilla (Mexico) |

| 11 March 2023 2023 UNCAF Women's U-19 Championship | Panama | 3–3 (3–4 p) | El Salvador | Tegucigalpa, Honduras |
| 11:00 | Gil 33'; Espino 83'; Rosas 86' | Report | Reyes 38'; Recintos 45'; Villaltoro 51' | Stadium: Centro Alto Rendimiento de Olimpia; Referee: Ximena Márquez (Mexico) |

| 14 April 2023 2023 CONCACAF Championship Women U20 - Qualification | Panama | 5–1 | Curaçao | Willemstad, Curaçao |
| 17:00 | Hincapie 13' 41'; Salazar 34' 77'; Gross 47' | Report | Rosa 59' | Stadium: Stadion Rignaal 'Jean' Francisca |

| 16 April 2023 2023 CONCACAF Championship Women U20 - Qualification | Bahamas | 0–13 | Panama | Willemstad, Curaçao |
| 14:00 | | Report | Gil 29'; Rosas 45+1'; Madrid 66' (pen.); Goldstein 83'; Hincapie 48' (pen.) 89'; Gross 17' 19' 32'; King 4' 13' 37' 61' | Stadium: Stadion Rignaal 'Jean' Francisca |

| 18 April 2023 2023 CONCACAF Championship Women U20 - Qualification | Panama | 11–0 | Sint Maarten | Willemstad, Curaçao |
| 14:00 | Espino 19'; Gil 36'; Salazar 56'; Rivera 6' 52'; King 76' 82'; Qunitero 8' 21' 67' 86' | Report | | Stadium: Stadion Rignaal 'Jean' Francisca |

| 17 May 2023 2023 Sud Ladies Cup | France | v | Panama | Avignon, France |
| 18:00 CET (UTC+1) | | Report | | Stadium: Parc des Sports |

| 19 May 2023 2023 Sud Ladies Cup | Japan | v | Panama | Avignon, France |
| 17:00 CET (UTC+1) | | Report | | Stadium: Parc des Sports |

| 21 May 2023 2023 Sud Ladies Cup | Cameroon | v | Panama | Avignon, France |
| 14:00 CET (UTC+1) | | Report | | Stadium: Parc des Sports |

| 24 May 2023 CONCACAF Women's U-20 Championship GS | United States | v | Panama | Santo Domingo, Dominican Republic |
| 19:00 | | | | Stadium: Félix Sánchez Olympic Stadium |

| 26 May 2023 CONCACAF Women's U-20 Championship GS | Panama | v | Canada | Santo Domingo, Dominican Republic |
| 15:00 | | | | Stadium: Félix Sánchez Olympic Stadium |

| 28 May 2023 CONCACAF Women's U-20 Championship GS | Jamaica | v | Panama | Santo Domingo, Dominican Republic |
| 15:00 | | | | Stadium: Félix Sánchez Olympic Stadium |

=== 2022 ===
| 26 June 2022 2022 Bolivarian Games | Colombia | 4–1 | Panama | Valledupar, Colombia |
| 19:00 | I. Izquierdo 1'; G. Robledo 10' 72'; L. Serna 22' | Report | Y. Atencio 3' | Stadium: Estadio Armando Maestre Pavajeau; Referee: Paula Fernández (Colombia) |

| 27 June 2022 2022 Bolivarian Games | Panama | 0–2 | Venezuela | Valledupar, Colombia |
| 16:00 | K. Campos 20'; M. Contreras 46' | Report | | Stadium: Estadio Armando Maestre Pavajeau; Referee: Paula Fernández (Colombia) |

| 28 June 2022 2022 Bolivarian Games | Paraguay | 3–0 | Panama | Valledupar, Colombia |
| 16:00 | P. Villalba 1'; C. Ramos 7'; N. Perruchini 67' | Report | | Stadium: Estadio Armando Maestre Pavajeau; Referee: Vanessa Ceballos (Colombia) |

== Competitive records ==
=== FIFA U-20 Women's World Cup ===
FIFA U-20 Women's World Cup record
| Year | Round | Position | MP | W | D* | L | GF | GA |
|---|---|---|---|---|---|---|---|---|
| (Canada) 2002 to (Poland) 2026 | Did not qualify | | | | | | | |
| (To be determined) 2028 | To be determined | | | | | | | |
| Total | – | 0/12 | 0 | 0 | 0 | 0 | 0 | 0 |

=== CONCACAF Women's U-20 Championship ===
CONCACAF Women's U-20 Championship record
| Year | Result | Matches | Wins | Draws | Losses | GF | GA |
|---|---|---|---|---|---|---|---|
| (Trinidad and Tobago) 2002 | Group stage | 3 | 2 | 0 | 1 | 15 | 2 |
| (Canada) 2004 | Group stage | 3 | 2 | 0 | 1 | 16 | 6 |
| (Mexico) 2006 | Group stage | 2 | 2 | 0 | 0 | 7 | 1 |
| (Mexico) 2008 to (Guatemala) 2010 | Did not qualify | | | | | | |
| (Panama) 2012 | Fourth Place | 5 | 2 | 0 | 3 | 5 | 19 |
| (Cayman Islands) 2014 | Did not qualify | | | | | | |
| (Honduras) 2015 | Group stage | 3 | 0 | 0 | 3 | 3 | 11 |
| (Trinidad and Tobago) 2018 to (Dominican Republic) 2020 | Did not qualify | | | | | | |
| (Dominican Republic) 2022 | Quarter-finals | 5 | 2 | 1 | 2 | 9 | 5 |
| (Dominican Republic) 2023 | Group stage | 3 | 0 | 0 | 3 | 1 | 15 |
| Total | 7/12 | 24 | 10 | 1 | 13 | 56 | 59 |
