= Cameroonian Women's Cup =

- Founded: 1986
- Region: Cameroon
- Current champions: Louves Minproff (6th title)
- Most championships: Canon Yaoundé (9 titles)
- 2020–21

The Cameroonian Women's Cup is a women's association football competition in Cameroon. Putting regional teams against each other. Founded in 1986, it is the women's equivalent of the Cameroonian Cup for men. The winner of the 2019 edition is Louves Minproff for the sixth time.

== Finals ==
The list of winners and runners-up:

Year	Winners	Score	Runners-up	Venue
1986–87	IPM Yaoundé	2–1	CSM Douala	
1987–88	not played			
1988–89	not played			
1989–90	Canon Yaoundé	–		
1990–91	not played			
1991–92	Cosmos de Douala	1–0	Abbe	
1992–93	Canon Yaoundé	–		
1993–94	Lorema FC Yaoundé	–		
1994–95	Canon Yaoundé	–	Lorema FC Yaoundé	
1995–96	Canon Yaoundé	–		
1996–97	not played			
1997–98	Lorema FC Yaoundé	4–3	Canon Yaoundé	Annex Omnisports Stadium, Yaoundé
1998–99	Lorema FC Yaoundé	–	Canon Yaoundé	
1999–00	Lorema FC Yaoundé	–	Canon Yaoundé	
2000–01	Canon Yaoundé	3–1	Lorema FC Yaoundé	
2001–02	Magic FC Bafoussam	–		
2002–03	Canon Yaoundé	3–1	Amazones FAP FC	Annex Omnisports Stadium, Yaoundé
2003–04	Canon Yaoundé	2–1	Express de Garoua	Military Stadium, Yaoundé
2004–05	Louves Minproff	1–1 (a.e.t.), (4–2 p)	Ngondi Nkam de Yabassi	Military Stadium, Yaoundé
2005–06	Justice FC Douala	1–1 (a.e.t.), (4–2 p)	Canon Yaoundé	
2006–07	Canon Yaoundé	0–0 (a.e.t.), (3–1 p)	Justice FC Douala	
2007–08	Canon Yaoundé	1–1 (a.e.t.), (5–3 p)	Sawa United Girls de Douala	Annex 3 Omnisports Stadium, Yaoundé
2008–09	Franck Rohlicek de Douala	3–2	Lorema FC Yaoundé	
2009–10	Franck Rohlicek de Douala	1–0	Louves Minproff	
2010–11	Franck Rohlicek de Douala	1–0	Canon Yaoundé	
2011–12	Lorema FC Yaoundé	2–1	Caïman FF de Douala	
2012–13	Caïman FF Douala	2–1	Lorema FC Yaoundé	Stade Ahmadou Ahidjo, Yaoundé
2013–14	Louves Minproff	2–1	AS Police (Yaoundé)	
2014–15	Louves Minproff	2–1	Amazones FAP FC	
2015–16	Louves Minproff	0–0 (a.e.t.), (4–3 p)	Amazones FAP FC	
2016–17	Amazones FAP FC	2–1	Louves Minproff	Military Stadium, Yaoundé
2017–18	Louves Minproff	5–0	Eclair FF Sa'a	Military Stadium, Yaoundé
2018–19	Louves Minproff	4–0	Caïman FF Douala	Annex 1 Omnisports Stadium, Yaoundé
2019–20	not played			
2020–21		–		

== Most successful clubs ==
Club	Winners	Runners-up	Winning Cups	Runners-up
Canon Yaoundé	9		1990, 1993, 1995, 1996, 2001, 2003, 2004, 2007, 2008	
Louves Minproff	6		2005, 2014, 2015, 2016, 2018, 2019	
Lorema FC Yaoundé	5		1994, 1998, 1999, 2000, 2012	
Franck Rohlicek de Douala	3		2009, 2010, 2011	
IPM Yaoundé	1		1987	
Cosmos de Douala	1		1992	
Magic FC Bafoussam	1		2002	
Justice FC Douala	1		2006	
Caïman FF Douala	1		2013	
Amazones FAP FC	1		2017	

== See also ==
- Cameroonian Women's Championship
