= Cameroon women's national under-17 football team =

Cameroon U-17
- Association: Cameroonian Football Federation
- Confederation: CAF (Africa)
- Sub-confederation: UNIFFAC (Central Africa)
- FIFA code: CMR
First colours	Second colours

African U-17 Women's World Cup qualification
- Appearances: 4 (first in 2008)
- Best result: Winners (2016, 2018)

FIFA U-17 Women's World Cup
- Appearances: 3 (first in 2016)
- Best result: Group stage (2016, 2018)

Cameroon women's national under-17 football team is a youth association football team operated under the auspices of the Cameroonian Football Federation. Its primary role is the development of players in preparation for the senior Cameroon women's national football team.

== FIFA U-17 Women's World Cup ==
Year	Result	Pld	W	D	L	GF	GA
(New Zealand) 2008	Did not qualify						
(Trinidad and Tobago) 2010	Did not enter						
(Azerbaijan) 2012	Did not qualify						
(Costa Rica) 2014	Did not enter						
(Jordan) 2016	Group stage	3	0	0	3	3	7
(Uruguay) 2018	Group stage	3	1	0	2	2	5
(India) 2022	Did not qualify						
(Dominican Republic) 2024	Did not qualify						
(Morocco) 2025	Group stage	3	0	0	3	4	7
(Morocco) 2026	Did not qualify						
(Morocco) 2027	To be determined						
(Morocco) 2028	To be determined						
(Morocco) 2029	To be determined						
Total	3/13	9	1	0	8	9	19

== African U-17 Cup of Nations for Women ==
Year	Result	Matches	Wins	Draws*	Losses	GF	GA
Home / away 2008	Third place	6	3	1	2	7	7
Home / away 2010	Did not enter						
Home / away 2012	First round	2	0	0	2	0	5
Home / away 2013	Did not enter						
Home / away 2016	Winners	4	3	0	1	9	4
Home / away 2018	Winners	4	2	2	0	14	3
Total	4/6	12	8	3	5	30	19

== Current squad ==
Squad for the 2016 FIFA U-17 Women's World Cup.

No.	Pos.	Player	Date of birth (age)	Club
1	GK	Carole Mimboe	15 January 1999 (aged 17)	(Cameroonian Football Federation) Louves Minproff
2	MF	Raissa Adama	29 December 1999 (aged 16)	(Cameroonian Football Federation) Social Mbam
3	DF	Dolores Tsadjia	9 March 1999 (aged 17)	(Cameroonian Football Federation) AS Green City Filles de Yaounde
4	DF	Claudia Dabda	1 July 2001 (aged 15)	(Cameroonian Football Federation) ASFF du Diamaré de Maroua
5	DF	Eni Kuchambi	2 April 1999 (aged 17)	(Cameroonian Football Federation) Gentile Ladies de Bamenda
6	MF	Viviane Mefire	19 December 2001 (aged 14)	(Cameroonian Football Federation) Canon
7	FW	Alice Djientieu	13 November 2001 (aged 14)	(Cameroonian Football Federation) AS Green City Filles de Yaounde
8	MF	Soline Djoubi	23 December 1999 (aged 16)	(Cameroonian Football Federation) Canon
9	FW	Alexandra Takounda	7 July 2000 (aged 16)	(Cameroonian Football Federation) Eclair FC de Saa
10	FW	Evanick Touta	2 April 1999 (aged 17)	(Cameroonian Football Federation) Louves Minproff
11	FW	Ruphine Beyina	20 July 1999 (aged 17)	(Cameroonian Football Federation) AS Green City Filles de Yaounde
12	MF	Rose Priso	1 January 2000 (aged 16)	(Cameroonian Football Federation) Louves Minproff
13	DF	Adeline Yami	12 February 2000 (aged 16)	(Cameroonian Football Federation) Amazone Fap de Yaounde
14	MF	Elodie Metho	10 March 2000 (aged 16)	(Cameroonian Football Federation) Social Mbam
15	DF	Reine Ambessegue	3 May 2000 (aged 16)	(Cameroonian Football Federation) Social Mbam
16	GK	Ange Bawou	12 February 2000 (aged 16)	(Cameroonian Football Federation) Social Mbam
17	DF	Moussa Zouwairatou	12 June 2001 (aged 15)	(Cameroonian Football Federation) Vent du Nord de Garoua
18	MF	Linda Tchomte	24 March 2001 (aged 15)	(Cameroonian Football Federation) AS Green City Filles de Yaounde
19	DF	Natatcha Elam Ekosso	5 December 2001 (aged 14)	(Cameroonian Football Federation) Vent du Nord de Garoua
20	DF	Michele Moumazin	15 July 2001 (aged 15)	(Cameroonian Football Federation) Panthère Security Filles de Garoua
21	GK	Hermine Nowou	17 August 2001 (aged 15)	(Cameroonian Football Federation) Binam FC de Bafoussam

== See also ==
- Cameroon women's national football team
- Cameroon women's national under-20 football team

== Head-to-head record ==
The following table shows Cameroon's head-to-head record in the FIFA U-17 Women's World Cup.

Opponent	Pld	W	D	L	GF	GA	GD	Win %
Canada	1	0	0	1	2	3	−1	0.00
Germany	2	1	0	1	1	2	−1	50.00
Mexico	1	0	0	1	0	1	−1	0.00
Netherlands	1	0	0	1	3	4	−1	0.00
North Korea	2	0	0	2	2	4	−2	0.00
United States	1	0	0	1	0	3	−3	0.00
Venezuela	1	0	0	1	1	2	−1	0.00
Total	9	1	0	8	9	19	−10	11.11
