= El Salvador women's national under-20 football team =

El Salvador women's U20
- Nickname: La Azulita
- Association: Federación Salvadoreña de Fútbol
- Confederation: CONCACAF (North America)
- Head coach: Eric Acuna
- FIFA code: SLV
First colours	Second colours

CONCACAF U-20 Championship
- Appearances: 3 (first in 2006)
- Best result: Quarterfinal (2022

The El Salvador women's Under 20's football team, is controlled by Federación Salvadoreña de Fútbol and represents El Salvador in international women's Under 20 or youth football competitions.

== Players ==
=== Current squad ===
- The following players were named to the squad to play in the 2025 CONCACAF Women's U-20 Championship qualification from 20 to 24 February 2025.

No.	Pos.	Player	Date of birth (age)	Caps	Goals	Club
	GK	Nicole Valenzuela	1 February 2007 (age 19)			(Salvadoran Football Federation) FAS
	GK	Hazel Silva	15 May 2009 (age 16)			(Salvadoran Football Federation) FAS
	DF	Andrea Saravia	15 January 2008 (age 18)			(United States Soccer Federation) IMDER
	DF	Alyssa Jurado	31 May 2007 (age 18)			(United States Soccer Federation) Bay Area Surf
	DF	Hailey Hernández	27 June 2007 (age 18)			(United States Soccer Federation) Fram G.A.
	DF	Sarina Cuéllar	1 June 2006 (age 19)			(United States Soccer Federation) UTEP Miners
	DF	Anita Frederick				(United States Soccer Federation) Alabama Crimson Tide
	DF	Olivia Gómez				(United States Soccer Federation) Columbia Central University
	DF	Zoe Castro	10 August 2009 (age 16)			(United States Soccer Federation) So Cal Blues
	DF	Keyla Lino				(Salvadoran Football Federation) Alianza Women
	MF	Maya Buerger	20 November 2009 (age 16)			(United States Soccer Federation) United Futbol Academy
	MF	Zoe Buerger				(United States Soccer Federation) Palm Beach Predators
	MF	Makayla Valencia				(United States Soccer Federation) S.F. United
	MF	Alexis Butz				(United States Soccer Federation) Sporting California
	MF	Jasmine Díaz				(United States Soccer Federation) HTX
	MF	Sophia Marroquín				(United States Soccer Federation) Beach F.C.
	MF	Amy Ángel	23 December 2006 (age 19)			(United States Soccer Federation) Virginia Development Academy
	MF	Valentina Alvarenga	4 February 2010 (age 16)			(Salvadoran Football Federation) Isidro Metapán
	FW	Karoline Velásquez				(United States Soccer Federation) AHFC Royals
	FW	Janelle Torres	23 May 2007 (age 18)			(United States Soccer Federation) United S.O. Cal E64

== Coaching staff ==
=== Current coaching staff ===
As of January 6, 2026

Position	Name	Nationality
Manager	Eric Acuña	El Salvador
Assistant manager	Hugo Escobar	Colombia
Goalkeeper coach	Fidel Mondragon	El Salvador
Strength/Conditioning Coach	Edgar Escobar	El Salvador

== History of Coaches ==
- (El Salvador) José Ricardo Herrera (2006)
- (El Salvador) Eric Acuna (since 2021)

== See also ==
- El Salvador women's national football team
- Federación Salvadoreña de Fútbol
