= Louves Minproff =

Women's association football club in Cameroon

- Full name: Louves Minproff de Yaoundé
- Nickname: Les Louves (The Wolves)
- Founded: 2003; 23 years ago
- Stadium: Stade Ahmadou Ahidjo; Yaoundé, Cameroon
- Capacity: 40,122
- League: Guinness Super League
- 2019-2020: 1st (champions)
Home colours	Away colours

Louves Minproff de Yaoundé, usually referred to simply as Louves Minproff, is a Cameroonian women's football club based in Yaoundé.

The team, which takes its name from the initials of the Minister of Women's Empowerment and the Family (French: Ministère de la promotion de la femme et de la famille, Minproff), plays in the Guinness Super League. Louves translates from French as 'she-wolves'.

During its history the club has won five titles (2011, 2012, 2015, 2019 and 2020) and six domestic cups (2014, 2015, 2016, 2018, 2019 and 2022.

== Current squad ==
Note: Flags indicate national team as defined under FIFA eligibility rules; some limited exceptions apply. Players may hold more than one non-FIFA nationality.

No.	Pos.	Nation	Player
—	GK		
—	DF		
—	MF		
—	FW		

No.	Pos.	Nation	Player
—	GK		
—	DF		
—	MF		
—	FW		
