= Cameroonian Women's Championship =

Guinness Super League
- Founded: 1990
- Country: Cameroon
- Confederation: CAF
- Number of clubs: 12
- Relegation to: Regional Championships
- Domestic cup: Cameroonian W-Cup
- International cup: CAF W-Champions League
- Current champions: FC Ebolowa (2nd title) (2021-22)
- Most championships: Canon Yaoundé (? titles)
- Current: 2025–26

The Cameroonian Women's Championship, called since the 2020–21 season Guinness Super League because of sponsorship, is the top flight of women's association football in Cameroon. The competition is run by the Cameroonian Football Federation.

== History ==
The championship was created in 1990. From this year to 2007 only regional leagues were played with the regional champions meeting in Yaoundé for the national title. The first national league in its new format was played in 2008.

== Champions ==
The list of champions and runners-up:

Year	Champions	Runners-up
1990–91	Canon Yaoundé	
1991–92		
1992–93	Cosmos de Douala	Nufi Forestière
1993–94	Canon Yaoundé	Lorema FC Yaoundé
1994–95		
1995–96	?	Lorema FC Yaoundé
1996–97		
1997–98	Lorema FC Yaoundé	
1998–99		
1999–00	Canon Yaoundé	
2000–01		
2001–02	Magic Bafoussam	
2002–03	Ngondi Nkam de Yabassi	Louves Minproff
2003–04	Canon Yaoundé	Tonnerre Yaoundé
2004–05		
2005–06	Canon Yaoundé	Ngondi Nkam de Yabassi
2006–07	Canon Yaoundé	Justice de Douala
2007–08	Lorema FC Yaoundé	Sawa United Girls de Douala
2008–09	not held	
2009–10	Franck Rohlicek de Douala	Sawa United Girls de Douala
2010–11	Louves Minproff	Lorema FC Yaoundé
2011–12	Louves Minproff	Lorema FC Yaoundé
2012–13	Caïman FF de Douala	Louves Minproff
2013–14		
2014–15	Louves Minproff	
2015–16	Amazones FAP FC	
2016–17	abandoned	
2017–18	AS Awa	Amazones FAP FC
2018–19	Louves Minproff	Amazones FAP FC
2019–20	Louves Minproff	AS Awa
2020–21	AS Awa	Louves Minproff
2022	AS Awa	Amazones FAP de Yaoundé
2023	Lekié FF	Eclair de Sa'a
2024	Ebolowa FC	Lekié FF
2025	Lekié FF	
2026	FC Ebolowa	Lekié FF

== See also ==
- Cameroonian Women's Cup
