= 2021 CAF Women's Champions League final =

Final of the 2021 CAF Women's Champions League

- Match programme cover
- Event: 2021 CAF Women's Champions League
Hasaacas Ladies	Mamelodi Sundowns
(Ghana)	(South Africa)
0	2
- Date: 19 November 2021
- Venue: 30 June Stadium, Cairo
- Player of the Match: Andisiwe Mgcoyi (Mamelodi Sundowns)
- Referee: Lidya Tafesse (Ethiopia)
- Attendance: 0 (Note: The final was played behind closed doors due to the COVID-19 pandemic in Egypt.)
- Weather: Mostly cloudy 20 °C (68 °F); 56% humidity

The 2021 CAF Women's Champions League final was the final match of the 2021 CAF Women's Champions League, the first and inaugural edition of Africa's premier women's club football tournament organised by CAF. It was played at 30 June Stadium in Cairo, Egypt on 19 November 2021.

Mamelodi Sundowns defeated Hasaacas Ladies 2–0 to win the first ever CAF Women's Champions League title.

== Teams ==
Team	Zone	Previous finals appearances (bold indicates winners)
(Ghana) Hasaacas Ladies	WAFU (West Africa)	None
(South Africa) Mamelodi Sundowns	COSAFA (Southern Africa)	None

== Venue ==
The final of the first CAF Women's Champions League was played as a single match at a pre-selected venue by CAF, similar to the format used in the men's competition. 30 June Stadium in Cairo, Egypt, home of Egyptian Premier League side Pyramids, was selected to host the final.

== Road to the final ==
(Ghana) Hasaacas Ladies		Round	(South Africa) Mamelodi Sundowns	
Opponent	Result	**Qualifying rounds** Group stage	Opponent	Result
(Nigeria) Rivers Angels	0–2	Matchday 1	Lesotho Defence Force	6–0
(Niger) AS Police	3–0	Matchday 2	(Botswana) Double Action Ladies	6–0
		Matchday 3	(Eswatini) Manzini Wonderers	6–1
**WAFU Zone B - Group 2 runners-up**: Pos / Team / Pld / Pts; 1 / (Nigeria) Rivers Angels / 2 / **6**; **2** / (Ghana) Hasaacas Ladies / **2** / **3**; 3 / (Niger) AS Police / 2 / **0**; Source:		Final standings	**COSAFA - Group A winners**: Pos / Team / Pld / Pts; **1** / (South Africa) Mamelodi Sundowns (H) / **3** / **9**; 2 / (Botswana) Double Action Ladies / 3 / **6**; 3 / (Eswatini) Manzini Wonderers / 3 / **1**; 4 / Lesotho Defence Force / 3 / **1**; Source: Goalzz (H) Hosts	
Opponent	Result	**Qualifying rounds** Knockout stage	Opponent	Result
(Burkina Faso) US Forces Armées	2–0	Semi-finals	(Zambia) Green Buffaloes	1–0
(Nigeria) Rivers Angels	3–1	Final	(Zimbabwe) Black Rhinos Queens	3–0
Opponent	Result	**Final rounds** Group stage	Opponent	Result
(Equatorial Guinea) Malabo Kings	3–1	Matchday 1	(Kenya) Vihiga Queens	1–0
(Mali) AS Mandé	3–0	Matchday 2	(Nigeria) Rivers Angels	1–0
(Egypt) Wadi Degla	2–2	Matchday 3	(Morocco) AS FAR	0–0
**Group A winners**: Pos / Team / Pld / Pts; **1** / (Ghana) Hasaacas Ladies / **3** / **7**; 2 / (Equatorial Guinea) Malabo Kings / 3 / **4**; 3 / (Egypt) Wadi Degla (H) / 3 / **4**; 4 / (Mali) AS Mandé / 3 / **1**; Source: Soccerway (H) Hosts		Final standings	**Group B winners**: Pos / Team / Pld / Pts; **1** / (South Africa) Mamelodi Sundowns / **3** / **7**; 2 / (Morocco) AS FAR / 3 / **4**; 3 / (Nigeria) Rivers Angels / 3 / **3**; 4 / (Kenya) Vihiga Queens / 3 / **3**; Source: Soccerway	
Opponent	Result	**Final rounds** Knockout stage	Opponent	Result
(Morocco) AS FAR	2–1	Semi-finals	(Equatorial Guinea) Malabo Kings	0–0 (5–4 p)

== Match ==
=== Details ===
The final match will helds after playing the Group stages and the semi-finals of the 2021 CAF Women's Champions League final tournament helds in Cairo.

19 November 2021
19:00 UTC+2

Hasaacas Ladies (Ghana)	0–2	(South Africa) Mamelodi Sundowns
	Report	Morifi 33'; Mgcoyi 65'

30 June Stadium, Cairo
Attendance: 0
Referee: Lidya Tafesse (Ethiopia)

**Hasaacas Ladies**	**Mamelodi Sundowns**

GK	16	(Ghana) Grace Banwaa Buoadu
RB	2	(Ghana) Blessing Agbomadzi
CB	4	(Ghana) Azumah Bugre
CB	5	(Ghana) Janet Egyir (c)
LB	6	(Ghana) Perpetual Agyekum
RM	8	(Ghana) Faustina Nyame Aidoo
CM	9	(Ghana) Veronica Appiah
LM	10	(Ghana) Doris Boaduwaa
RF	13	(Ghana) Evelyn Badu
CF	17	(Ghana) Rahama Jafaru	(substituted off) 84'
LF	18	(Ghana) Regina Antwi	(substituted off) 46'
Substitutes:
GK	1	(Ghana) Diana Maaweremou
GK	19	(Ghana) Faustina Owusu Nyamekye
GK	26	(Ghana) Patricia Mantey
DF	3	(Ghana) Francisca Asante
DF	11	(Ghana) Lauratu Issaka
DF	14	(Ghana) Asana Yahaya
DF	24	(Ghana) Queenabel Akosua Amankwah	(substituted on) 46'
MF	12	(Ghana) Linda Epo
MF	23	(Ghana) Comfort Owusu
FW	7	(Ghana) Doreen Copson
FW	15	(Ghana) Success Ameyaa	(substituted on) 84'
FW	20	(Burkina Faso) Fatoumata Tamboura
FW	22	(Ghana) Millot Abena Pokuaa
Manager:
(Ghana) Yusif Basigi

GK	1	(South Africa) Andile Dlamini
RB	3	(South Africa) Karabo Makhurubetshi		(substituted off) 86'
CB	4	(South Africa) Thalea Smidt
CB	5	(South Africa) Zanele Nhlapho (c)
LB	8	(South Africa) Chuene Morifi
RM	11	(South Africa) Melinda Kgadiete
CM	12	(South Africa) Bambanani Mbane
LM	15	(South Africa) Lerato Kgasago	(yellow card) 75'
RF	16	(South Africa) Lelona Daweti
CF	17	(South Africa) Andisiwe Mgcoyi	(yellow card) 42'	(substituted off) 90'
LF	21	(South Africa) Nonhlanhla Mthandi
Substitutes:
GK	2	(South Africa) Asa Phillistus Rabalao
GK	26	(South Africa) Nthabiseng Prisca Matshaba
DF	13	(South Africa) Oratile Mokwena
DF	14	(South Africa) Sizanda Komane
DF	25	(South Africa) Khutso Pila
DF	18	(South Africa) Regina Keresi Mogolola	(red card) 90+4'	(substituted on) 86'
DF	24	(South Africa) Lebogang Mabatle
MF	6	(South Africa) Bongiwe Thusi
MF	7	(South Africa) Lehlogonolo Mashigo
MF	19	(South Africa) Boitumelo Rabele
MF	22	(South Africa) Khunjulwa Mali
FW	9	(South Africa) Rhoda Mulaudzi		(substituted on) 90'
FW	10	(South Africa) Chantelle Esau
FW	23	(South Africa) Rebone Thembelihle Masibi
Manager:
(South Africa) Agnes Nkosi

Player of the Match:
Andisiwe Mgcoyi (Mamelodi Sundowns)

Assistant referees:
Queency Clodia Victorie (Mauritius)
Mimisen Agatha Iyorhe (Nigeria)
Fourth official:
Shahenda Saad Al-Maghraby (Egypt)
Reserve assistant referee:
Lidwine Pelagie Rakotozafinoro (Madagascar)
Video assistant referee:
Bouchra Karboubi (Morocco)
Assistant video assistant referee:
Fatiha Jermoumi (Morocco)

**Match rules**

- 90 minutes.
- 30 minutes of extra time if necessary.
- Penalty shoot-out if scores still level.
- Twelve named substitutes.
- Maximum of three substitutions, with a fourth allowed in extra time.
