= Lehlogonolo Mashigo =

South African professional soccer player and artist

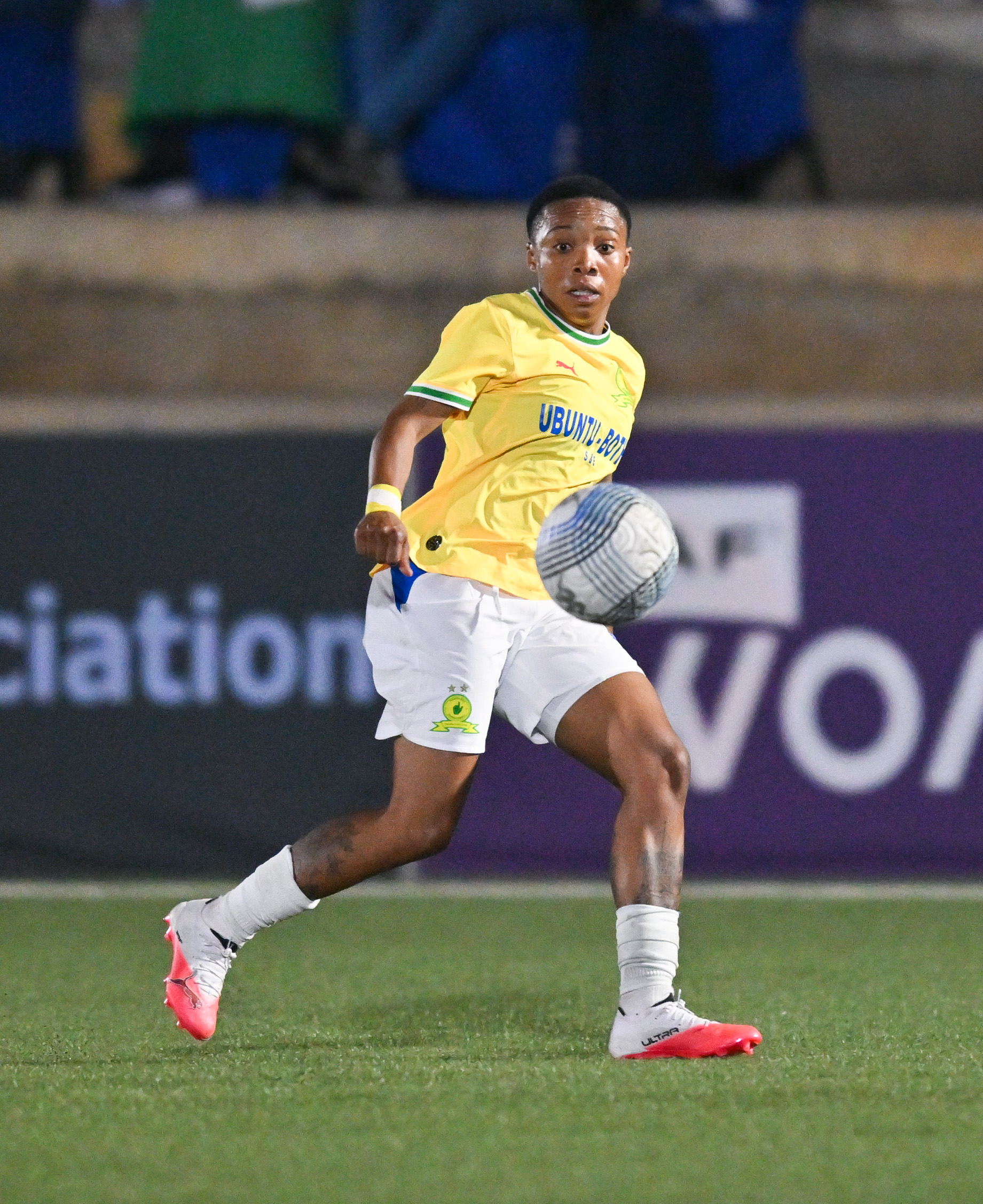
- Mashigo in 2026

Personal information
- Full name: Modikanalo Lehlogonolo Sebastian Mashigo
- Date of birth: July 20, 1999 (age 27)
- Place of birth: Mamelodi, Gauteng, South Africa
- Position: Midfielder

Team information
- Current team: Mamelodi Sundowns Ladies
- Number: 7

Senior career*
Years	Team	Apps	(Gls)
- Mamelodi Sundowns Ladies
Medal record
CAF Women's Champions League
Gold medal – first place	2021 Egypt
Silver medal – second place	2022 Morocco
Gold medal – first place	2023 Côte d'Ivoire
COSAFA Women's Champions League
Gold medal – first place	2021 South Africa
Silver medal – second place	2022 South Africa
Gold medal – first place	2023 South Africa
Gold medal – first place	2026 Botswana
- * Club domestic league appearances and goals

Modikanalo Lehlogonolo Sebastian Mashigo (born 20 July 1999), also known as Hlogi Mash, is a South African professional soccer player, artist and dancer, who plays as a midfielder for SAFA Women's League club Mamelodi Sundowns.

== Club career ==
Mashigo joined Mamelodi Sundowns Ladies in 2020 ahead of the SAFA Women’s League season. She featured in the squad that secured the 2020 league title, a victory that qualified the club for the inaugural COSAFA Women’s Champions League.

In 2021, Mashigo was part of the Sundowns Ladies team that completed a historic treble. The club won both the inaugural COSAFA Women’s Champions League and the first edition of the CAF Women’s Champions League, and capped the season by retaining the SAFA Women's League League title in December 2021.

Sundowns Ladies finished as runners‑up in both the 2022 COSAFA Women’s Champions League and the 2022 CAF Women’s Champions League. They nevertheless continued their domestic dominance, claiming a third consecutive SAFA Women's League title in November 2022.

In 2023, Sundowns Ladies secured their second treble. They won the 2023 COSAFA Women’s Champions League, regained the CAF Women’s Champions League title, and completed the achievement by lifting the 2023 Hollywoodbets Super League trophy in December.

Mashigo represented the club at the 2026 COSAFA Women’s Champions League, including the match against Costa do Sol.

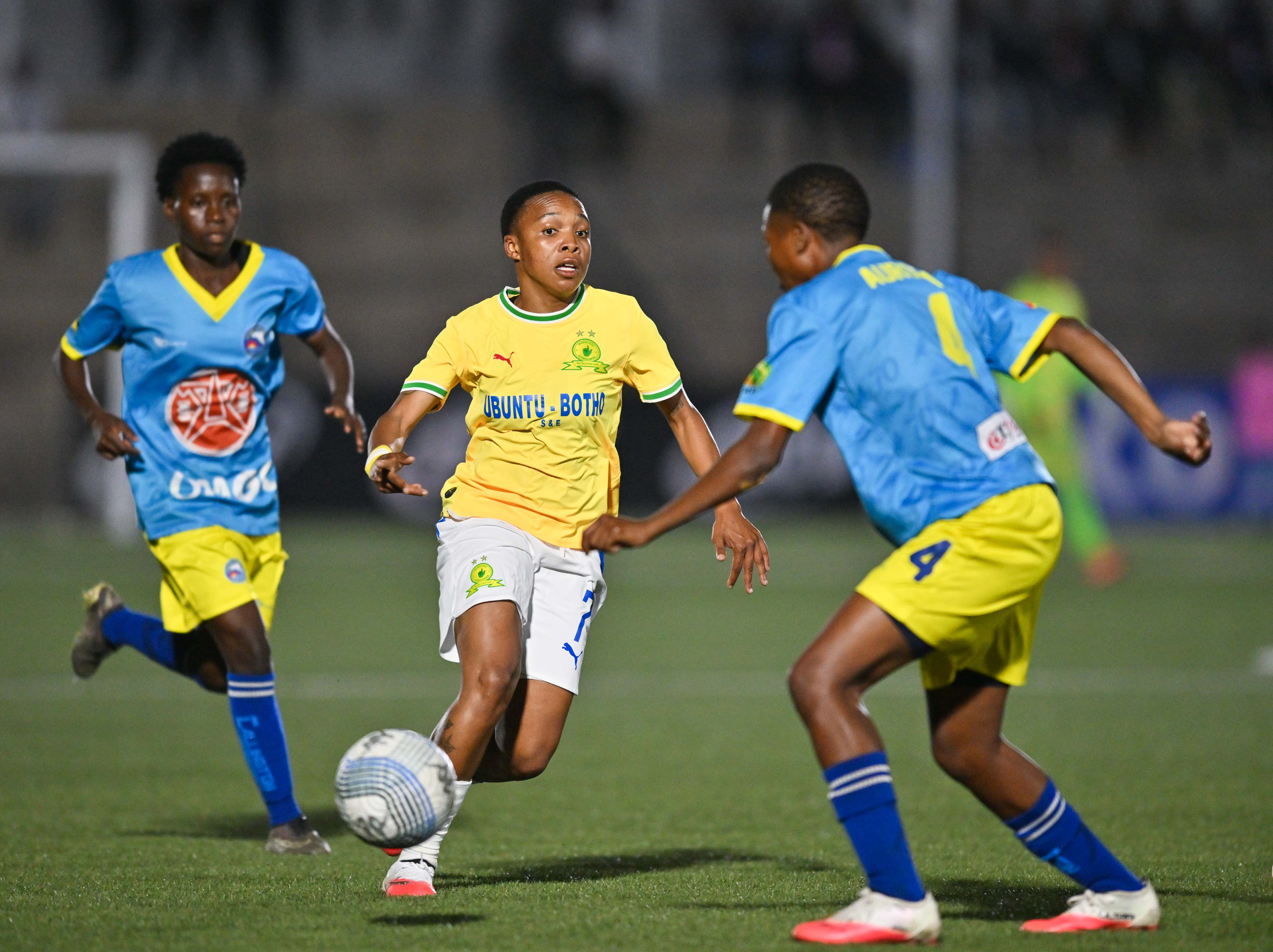
Mashigo at the 2026 COSAFA Women's Champions League against Costa do Sol

== Personal life ==
Mashigo was born in Mamelodi, East of Pretoria to Gladys Mashigo. She matriculated at Mamelodi High School.

== Music and dance ==
Mashigo is also known by her stage name Hlogi Mash.

In 2022, she appeared in the third episode of the Sundowns Stories YouTube documentary series. Her feature, titled Hlogi– Shoe Shine and the Yanos, explored her life and career as a dancer.

She released her debut EP in 2022, which included the singles Mamelodi, Jersey No. 7, a reference to the number she wears at Mamelodi Sundowns Ladies, Ke Bosso, and EHH JOH. The project has accumulated more than 90,000 listeners on Spotify.

In 2023, Mashigo was featured on the track Hwiralang by Mac Lopez, EmKay and MacG. The song surpassed 1.6 million streams on Spotify.

In 2024, Mash and her dance partner Hope Ramafalo became the first South African dancers to receive the TikTok multi‑platinum plaque for creating the viral Hamba Wena dance challenge. They also appeared in the song’s music video, which had reached 19 million views on YouTube by April 2024.

== Honours ==
=== Mamelodi Sundowns Ladies ===
- SAFA Women's League: 2020, 2021, 2022, 2023, 2024, 2025
- CAF Women's Champions League: 2021, 2023; runners-up: 2022
- COSAFA Women's Champions League: 2021, 2023, 2026; runners-up 2022
