= Oratile Mokwena =

Suth African soccer player (born 2001)

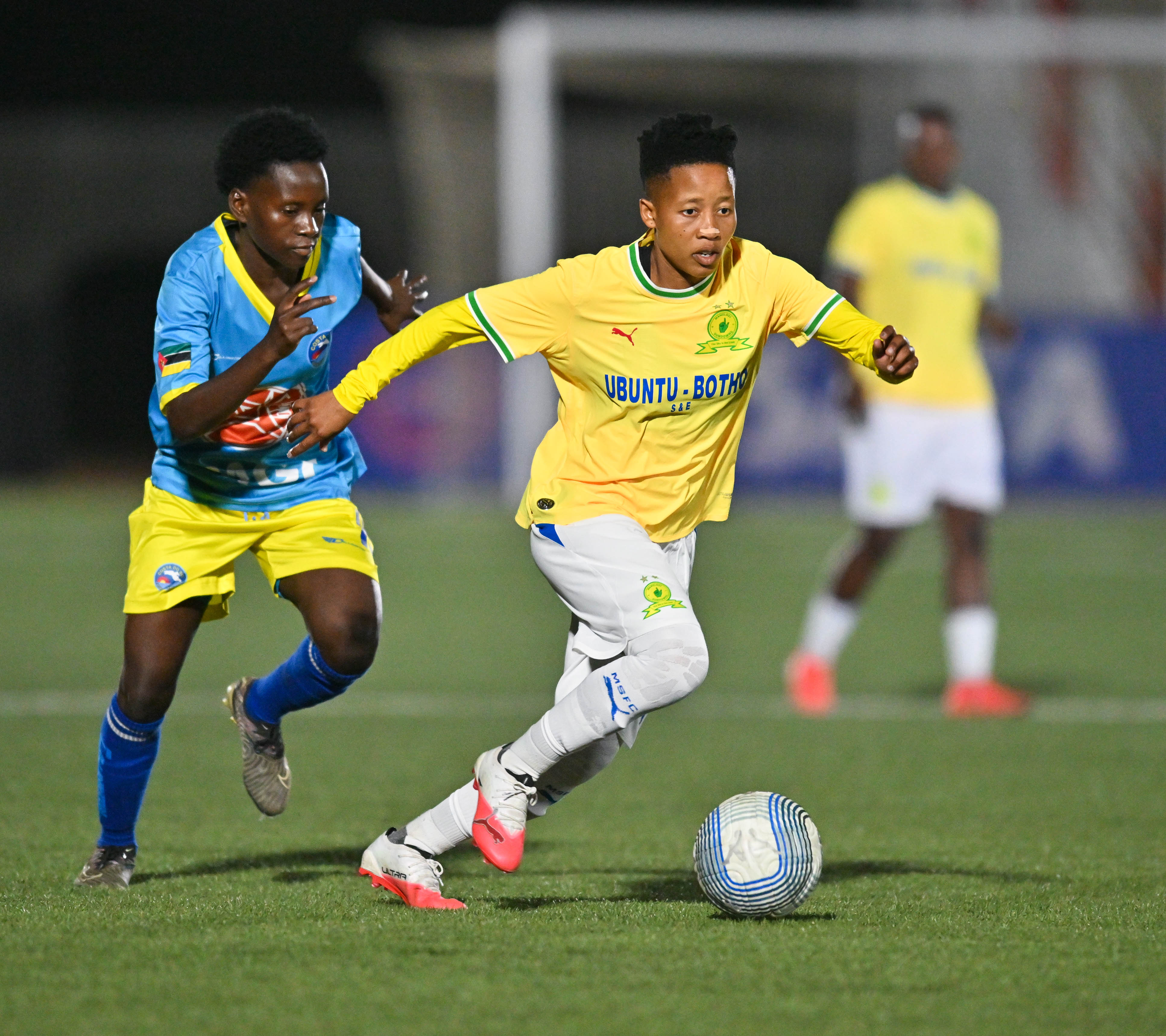
- Mokwena in 2026

Personal information
- Full name: Oratile Dikgosi Mokwena
- Date of birth: 21 March 2001 (age 25)
- Height: 1.58 m (5 ft 2 in)
- Position: Midfielder

Team information
- Current team: Mamelodi Sundowns Ladies
- Number: 13

Senior career*
Years	Team	Apps	(Gls)
2016–	Mamelodi Sundowns Ladies		

International career
2017–2018	South Africa U/17		
2019–2020	South Africa U/20		
2020–	South Africa		
Medal record
Representing South Africa
COSAFA Women's Championship
Gold medal – first place	2020 South Africa
CAF Women's Champions League
Gold medal – first place	2021 Egypt
Silver medal – second place	2022 Morocco
Gold medal – first place	2023 Côte d'Ivoire
COSAFA Women's Champions League
Gold medal – first place	2021 South Africa
Silver medal – second place	2022 South Africa
Gold medal – first place	2023 South Africa
Gold medal – first place	2026 Botswana
- * Club domestic league appearances and goals

Oratile Dikgosi Mokwena (born 21 March 2001) is a South African soccer player who plays as a midfielder for SAFA Women's League club Mamelodi Sundowns and the South Africa women's national team.

== Club career ==
In 2016, she joined Mamelodi Sundowns Ladies as an academy player and made it through the ranks to the senior team.

She was part of the squad that won the 2021 COSAFA Women's Champions League, 2021 CAF Women's Champions League, 2021 SAFA Women's League, 2022 SAFA Women's League, 2023 COSAFA Women's Champions League, the 2023 CAF Women's Champions League and the 2023 SAFA Women's League titles.

At the 2021 CAF Women's Champions League, she was voted player of the match in the 1–0 win over Rivers Angeles of Nigeria.

== International career ==
Mokwena represented South Africa at the 2018 FIFA U-17 Women's World Cup in Uruguay. She also played for the U/20 team in the 2020 FIFA U-20 Women's World Cup qualifiers before the event got cancelled due to COVID.

She competed for senior women's team at the 2020 COSAFA Women's Championship when the team won their seventh COSAFA title.

== Honours ==
South Africa

- COSAFA Women's Championship: 2020

Mamelodi Sundowns Ladies

- CAF Women's Champions League: 2021, 2023; runners-up: 2022
- COSAFA Women's Champions League: 2021, 2023, 2026
- SAFA Women's League: 2021, 2022, 2023, 2024, 2025
