= 2026 CAF Women's Champions League COSAFA Qualifiers =

Hollywoodbets COSAFA Women's Champions League 2026

Tournament details
- Host country: Botswana
- City: Gaborone
- Dates: 20–29 August
- Teams: 8 (from 8 associations)
- Venue: 1 (in 1 host city)

Final positions
- Champions: (South Africa) Mamelodi Sundowns (3rd title)
- Runners-up: (Zambia) ZESCO Ndola
- Third place: (Botswana) Gaborone United
- Fourth place: (Malawi) Silver Strikers Ladies

Tournament statistics
- Matches played: 16
- Goals scored: 59 (3.69 per match)
- Top scorer(s): (Botswana) Refilwe Tholakele (SUN) (7 goals)
- Best player: (South Africa) Karabo Dhlamini (SUN)
- Best goalkeeper: (South Africa) Andile Dlamini (SUN)
- Fair play award: (Zambia) ZESCO Ndola Girls
- All statistics correct as of 29 August 2026.

The 2026 COSAFA Women's Champions League, officially known as the 2026 Hollywoodbets COSAFA Women's Champions League for sponsorship reasons, was the sixth edition of the annual international women's club football competition organized by COSAFA to decide the region's qualifier for the 2026 CAF Women's Champions League. The tournament was held in Gaborone, Botswana, from 20 to 29 August 2026, making it the country's first hosting of a major COSAFA tournament since the 2011 COSAFA Under-20 Championship.

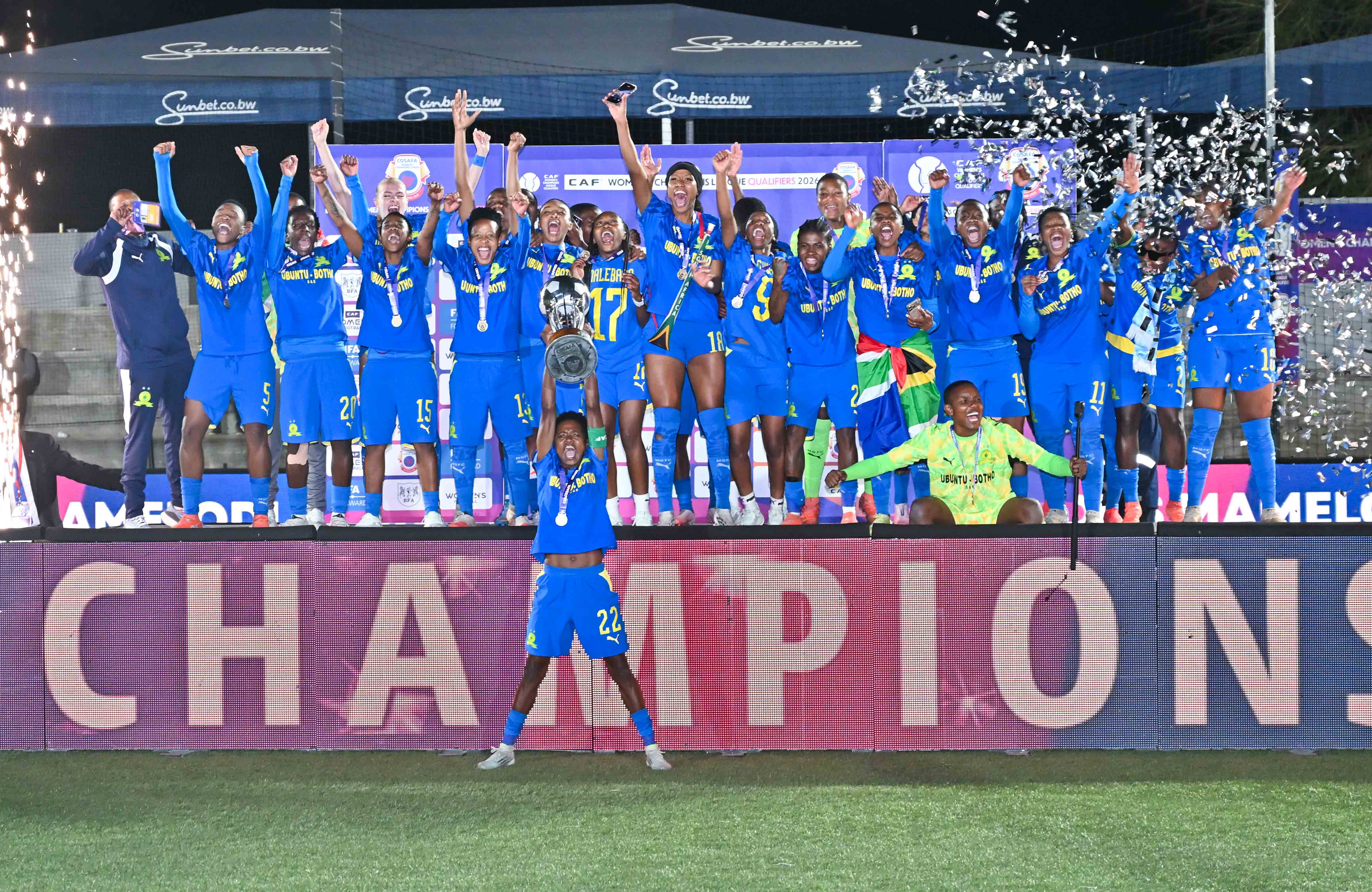
Mamelodi Sundowns celebrate after the final.

Gaborone United Ladies were the defending champions, having won last year's final 4–3 on penalties. They were defeated 5–0 in the semifinals by Mamelodi Sundowns who went on to win their third title after defeating ZESCO Ndola 2–1 in the final.

== Entrants ==
Eight of the fourteen COSAFA member associations entered teams in the competition, with each participating association nominating one club to represent it based on sporting merit.

Team	Qualifying method	App. (last)
(Botswana) Gaborone United Ladies	2026 BH National Women's First Division League champions	3rd (2025)
(Eswatini) Nsingizini Hotspurs	2025–26 Eswatini Women's League champions	1st
Lesotho Defence Force Ladies	2025–26 Lesotho Women's Super League champions	3rd (2023)
(Malawi) Silver Strikers Ladies	2025–26 NBM Women's Premiership champions	1st
(Mozambique) Costa do Sol	2025 Mozambican Campeonato Nacional de Futebol Feminino champions	4th (2025)
(South Africa) Mamelodi Sundowns	2025 SAFA Women's League champions	5th (2025)
(Zambia) ZESCO Ndola Girls	2025–26 ZPL Women's Super League champions	2nd (2025)
(Zimbabwe) Herentals Queens	2025 Zimbabwe Women Premier Soccer League champions	3rd (2025)

Associations that did not enter a team:

- Angola
- Madagascar
- Mauritius
- Seychelles
- Comoros
- Namibia

== Venue ==
All matches will be played in Gaborone, Botswana.

City	Venue	Capacity
Gaborone	Gaborone United Stadium (GU)	5,000

== Match officials ==
Referees

- (Botswana) Kealeboga Koitsiwe
- (Botswana) Seonyatseng Tshephe
- (Lesotho) Mathapelo Morake
- (Madagascar) Élodie Livaharivony
- (Malawi) Rose Zimba
- (Mozambique) Cacilda Fernando
- (South Africa) Nonjabulo Ndlela
- (Zambia) Anna Banda
- (Zimbabwe) Mercy Mayimbo

Assistant Referees

- (Botswana) Kakale Mbiko
- (Botswana) Leungo Tsogang
- (Lesotho) Fumane Mokhethi
- (Malawi) Mphatso Mamete
- (Namibia) Eveline Augustinus
- (South Africa) Nandipha Menze
- (Zambia) Beauty Siatontola
- (Zimbabwe) Dominica Melusi

Video assistant referees (VAR)

- (South Africa) Abongile Tom

Assistant video assistant referees (AVAR)

- (Zimbabwe) Brighton Chimene

== Draw ==
The draw for the group stage was held in Gaborone, Botswana on 4 August 2026 at 11:00 CAT (UTC+2). As the host and defending champions, Gaborone United were automatically seeded in position A1, while Mamelodi Sundowns, the highest-ranked team across the previous three editions, were automatically seeded in position B1. The remaining six teams were divided into two pots based on their rankings: the next two highest-ranked teams were placed in Pot 1, while the remaining four teams were placed in Pot 2. Two additional pots, designated Pot A and Pot B, were used to determine the group positions of teams drawn from Pots 1 and 2.

The draw began by randomly selecting a team from Pot 1, placing them into Group A, followed by another Pot 1 team being assigned to Group B. The same procedure was then repeated with the teams in Pot 2, with one team drawn into Group A and another into Group B, until all teams had been allocated.

Pot 1	Pot 2
(Zambia) ZESCO Ndola Girls; (Mozambique) Costa do Sol	(Zimbabwe) Herentals Queens; (Eswatini) Nsingizini Hotspurs; Lesotho Defence Force Ladies; (Malawi) Silver Strikers Ladies

The draw resulted in the following groups:

Group A
Pos	Team
A1	(Botswana) Gaborone United
A2	(Lesotho) LDF Ladies
A3	(Zambia) ZESCO Ndola Girls
A4	(Zimbabwe) Herentals Queens

Group B
Pos	Team
B1	(South Africa) Mamelodi Sundowns
B2	(Eswatini) Nsingizini Hotspurs
B3	(Mozambique) Costa do Sol
B4	(Malawi) Silver Strikers Ladies

== Group stage ==
Tie-breaking criteria for the group stage
Teams were ranked according to points (3 points for a win, 1 point for a draw, 0 points for a loss), and if tied on points, the following tiebreaking criteria were applied, in the order given, to determine the rankings:
1. Points in head-to-head matches among tied teams;
2. Goal difference in head-to-head matches among tied teams;
3. Goals scored in head-to-head matches among tied teams;
4. If more than two teams were tied, and after applying all head-to-head criteria above, a subset of teams were still tied, all head-to-head criteria above were reapplied exclusively to this subset of teams;
5. Goal difference in all group matches;
6. Goals scored in all group matches;
7. Disciplinary points (yellow card = 1 point, red card as a result of two yellow cards = 3 points, direct red card = 3 points, yellow card followed by direct red card = 4 points);
8. Drawing of lots.

=== Group A ===
Pos	Team	Pld	W	D	L	GF	GA	GD	Pts	Qualification
1	(Zambia) ZESCO Ndola Girls	3	3	0	0	8	2	+6	9	Semi-finals
2	(Botswana) Gaborone United (H)	3	2	0	1	3	3	0	6	Semi-finals
3	(Zimbabwe) Herentals Queens	3	1	0	2	3	6	−3	3	
4	Lesotho Defence Force Ladies	3	0	0	3	1	4	−3	0	

Source: COSAFA
Rules for classification: Tiebreakers
(H) Hosts
20 August 2026
12:00

ZESCO Ndola Girls (Zambia)	5–2	(Zimbabwe) Herentals Queens
Phiri 6' (pen.), 51'; Mubanga 10', 22'; Milambo 66'		Benza 43'; Gwangwara 81'

Gaborone United Stadium, Gaborone
Referee: Nonjabulo Ndlela (South Africa)
20 August 2026
15:00

Gaborone United (Botswana)	2–1	Lesotho Defence Force Ladies
Radiakanyo 54'; Tlamma 88'		Namane 15'

Gaborone United Stadium, Gaborone
Referee: Mercy Mayimbo (Zimbabwe)

22 August 2026
16:00

Lesotho Defence Force Ladies	0–1	(Zambia) ZESCO Ndola Girls
		Phiri 45+1'

Gaborone United Stadium, Gaborone
Referee: Rose Zimba (Malawi)
22 August 2026
19:00

Gaborone United (Botswana)	1–0	(Zimbabwe) Herentals Queens
Ontlametse 18'

Gaborone United Stadium, Gaborone
Referee: Cacilda Fernando (Mozambique)

24 August 2026
16:00

Herentals Queens (Zimbabwe)	1–0	Lesotho Defence Force Ladies
Mupuwa 34'

Gaborone United Stadium, Gaborone
Referee: Kealeboga Koitsiwe (Botswana)
24 August 2026
19:00

Gaborone United (Botswana)	0–2	(Zambia) ZESCO Ndola Girls
		Mubanga 1'; Chitundu 88'

Gaborone United Stadium, Gaborone
Referee: Rose Zimba (Malawi)

=== Group B ===
Pos	Team	Pld	W	D	L	GF	GA	GD	Pts	Qualification
1	(South Africa) Mamelodi Sundowns	3	3	0	0	15	1	+14	9	Semi-finals
2	(Malawi) Silver Strikers Ladies	3	2	0	1	7	5	+2	6	Semi-finals
3	(Mozambique) Costa do Sol	3	1	0	2	5	7	−2	3	
4	(Eswatini) Nsingizini Hotspurs	3	0	0	3	2	16	−14	0	

Source: COSAFA
Rules for classification: Tiebreakers
21 August 2026
12:00

Costa do Sol (Mozambique)	1–2	(Malawi) Silver Strikers
Moçambique 1'		Khumalo 69'; Kakangula 85'

Gaborone United Stadium, Gaborone
Referee: Mathapelo Morake (Lesotho)
21 August 2026
15:00

Mamelodi Sundowns (South Africa)	8–0	(Eswatini) Nsingizini Hotspurs
Daweti 9', 18', 20'; Ludwig 12'; Tholakele 17', 31', 45+2'; Mugwara 76'

Gaborone United Stadium, Gaborone
Referee: Anna Banda (Zambia)

23 August 2026
16:00

Nsingizini Hotspurs (Eswatini)	1–3	(Mozambique) Costa do Sol
Gaonwe 21'		Moçambique 8', 19'; Farranguana 39'

Gaborone United Stadium, Gaborone
Referee: Élodie Livaharivony (Madagascar)
23 August 2026
19:00

Mamelodi Sundowns (South Africa)	3–0	(Malawi) Silver Strikers
Dhlamini 11', 19'; Ludwig 51'

Gaborone United Stadium, Gaborone
Referee: Mercy Mayimbo (Zimbabwe)

25 August 2026
16:00

Silver Strikers (Malawi)	5–1	(Eswatini) Nsingizini Hotspurs
Kakangula 2'; Mathyola 45+3', 56', 63'; Banda 50'		Gaonwe 76'

Gaborone United Stadium, Gaborone
Referee: Nonjabulo Ndlela (South Africa)
25 August 2026
19:00

Mamelodi Sundowns (South Africa)	4–1	(Mozambique) Costa do Sol
Hadebe 8'; Shongwe 19'; Donnelly 34'; Kgadiete 81'		Moçambique 60'

Gaborone United Stadium, Gaborone
Referee: Anna Banda (Zambia)

== Knockout stage ==
In the semi-finals, matches level after 90 minutes were decided by a penalty shoot-out, while extra time (followed by penalties if required) would be used only in the final.

=== Bracket ===
Semi-finals
27 August – Gaborone
(Zambia) ZESCO Ndola Girls	2
(Malawi) Silver Strikers	1
27 August – Gaborone
(South Africa) Mamelodi Sundowns	5
(Botswana) Gaborone United	0

Final
29 August – Gaborone
(Zambia) ZESCO Ndola Girls	1
(South Africa) Mamelodi Sundowns	2
Third-place play-off
29 August – Gaborone
(Malawi) Silver Strikers	0
(Botswana) Gaborone United	4

=== Semi-finals ===
27 August 2026
16:00

ZESCO Ndola Girls (Zambia)	2–1	(Malawi) Silver Strikers
Mulubwa 11'; Mubanga 17'		Mathyola 63'

Gaborone United Stadium, Gaborone
Referee: Seonyatseng Tshephe (Botswana)

27 August 2026
19:00

Mamelodi Sundowns (South Africa)	5–0	(Botswana) Gaborone United
Tholakele 20', 67'; Mthandi 45+2'; Ludwig 77'; Shonwge 90+3'

Gaborone United Stadium, Gaborone
Referee: Eness Gumbo (Malawi)

=== Third-place play-off ===
29 August 2026
15:00

Silver Strikers (Malawi)	0–4	(Botswana) Gaborone United
		Maponga 60', 83' (pen.); Modise 74', 88'

Gaborone United Stadium, Gaborone
Referee: Mercy Mayimbo (Zimbabwe)

=== Final ===
29 August 2026
18:00

ZESCO Ndola Girls (Zambia)	1–2	(South Africa) Mamelodi Sundowns
Mubanga 45+4'		Tholakele 2', 63' (pen.)

Gaborone United Stadium, Gaborone
Referee: Eness Gumbo (Malawi)

== Awards and statistics ==
There have been 59 goals scored in 16 matches, for an average of 3.69 goals per match (as of 29 August 2026).

Rank	Player	Team	Goals
1	(Botswana) Refilwe Tholakele	(South Africa) Mamelodi Sundowns	7
2	(Mozambique) Lúcia Moçambique	(Mozambique) Costa do Sol	4
2	(Zambia) Charity Mubanga	(Zambia) ZESCO Ndola Girls	4
2	(Zambia) Eneless Phiri	(Zambia) ZESCO Ndola Girls	4
5	(Malawi) Carolyne Mathyola	(Malawi) Silver Strikers Ladies	3
5	(South Africa) Lelona Daweti	(South Africa) Mamelodi Sundowns	3
5	(South Africa) Isabella Ludwig	(South Africa) Mamelodi Sundowns	3
5	(Zambia) Milla Milambo	(Zambia) ZESCO Ndola Girls	3
9	(Malawi) Grace Kakangula	(Malawi) Silver Strikers Ladies	2
9	(South Africa) Karabo Dhlamini	(South Africa) Mamelodi Sundowns	2
9	(South Africa) Wendy Shongwe	(South Africa) Mamelodi Sundowns	2
9	(Eswatini) Lucia Gaonwe	(Eswatini) Nsingizini Hotspurs	2
9	(Botswana) Maungo Maponga	(Botswana) Gaborone United Ladies	2
9	(Botswana) Yaone Modise	(Botswana) Gaborone United Ladies	2
9	(South Africa) Nonhlanhla Mthandi	(South Africa) Mamelodi Sundowns	2
9	(Zambia) Penelope Mulubwa	(Zambia) ZESCO Ndola Girls	2

=== Group Stage Best XI ===
The COSAFA Technical Study Group has announced the group stage Best XI as follows:

Goalkeepers	Defenders	Midfielders	Forwards
Group Stage Best XI
(South Africa) Dlamini	(South Africa) Dhlamini (Botswana) Mochawe (South Africa) Pila	(South Africa) Ludwig (Malawi) Khumalo (Botswana) Radiakanyo (Mozambique) Moçambique	(South Africa) Daweti (Zambia) Mubanga (Zambia) Phiri

Coach: (Zambia) Florence Nkatya

=== Overall Best XI ===
The COSAFA Technical Study Group has announced the tournament's Best XI as follows:

Goalkeepers	Defenders	Midfielders	Forwards
Best XI
(South Africa) Dlamini	(South Africa) Pila (South Africa) Dhlamini (Zambia) Chomba	(South Africa) Ludwig (Malawi) Khumalo (Botswana) Radiakanyo (Zambia) Bwalya	(Botswana) Tholakele (Zambia) Mubanga (Zambia) Phiri

Coach: (South Africa) Godfrey Sapula

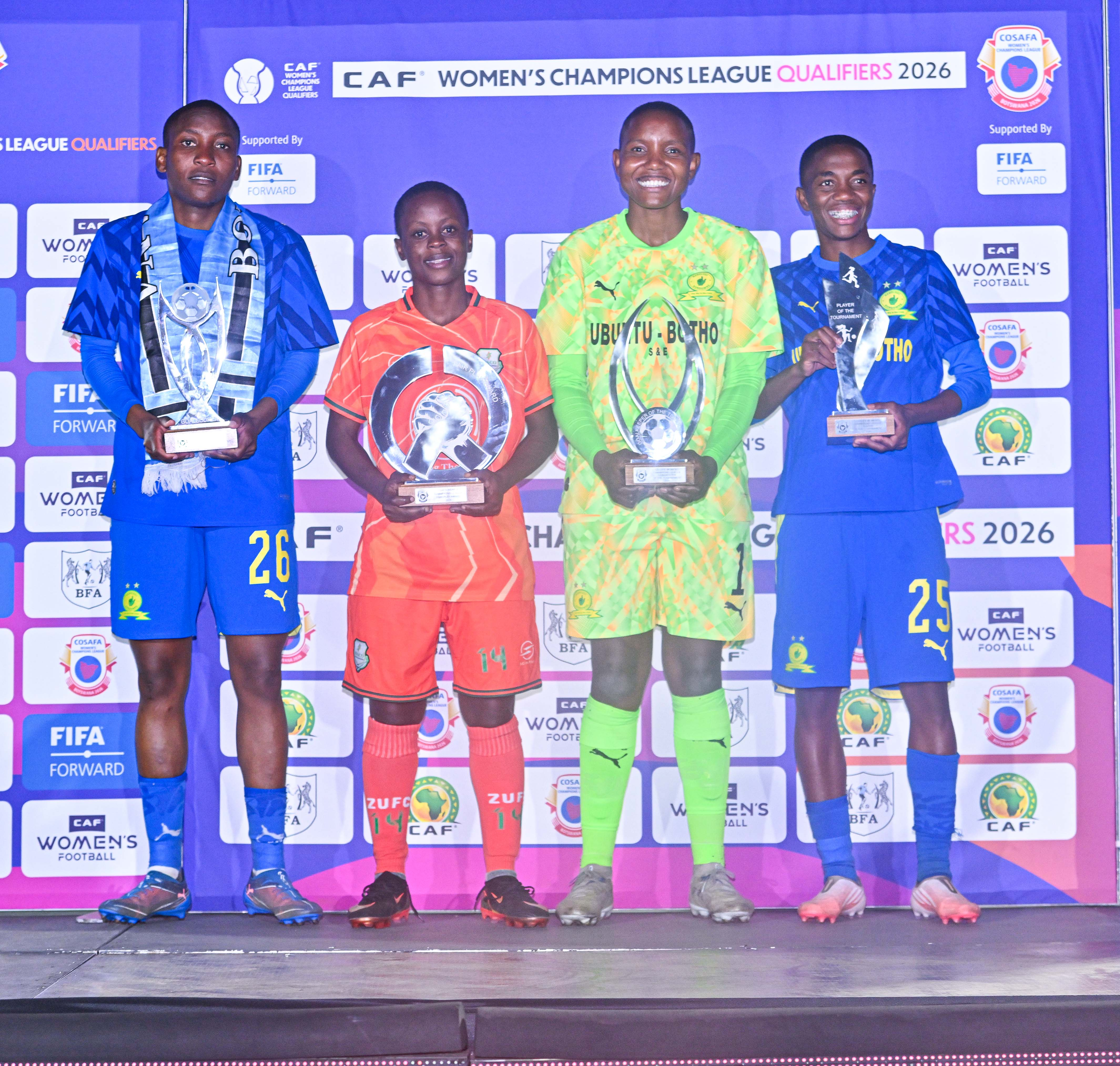
The award recipients

The COSAFA Women's Champions League technical study group selected the following as the best of the tournament.

Award	Player	Team
Best Player	(South Africa) Karabo Dhlamini	(South Africa) Mamelodi Sundowns
Top Goal scorer	(Botswana) Refilwe Tholakele	(South Africa) Mamelodi Sundowns
Best Goalkeeper	(South Africa) Andile Dlamini	(South Africa) Mamelodi Sundowns
Fairplay team	(Zambia) ZESCO Ndola Girls	
