= Nsingizini Hotspurs Ladies F.C. =

Women's football team

Nsingizini Hotspurs Ladies
- Full name: Nsingizini Hotspurs Ladies Football Club
- Nicknames: Insingizi Yezulu; Umgugudla Lomkhulu
- League: Eswatini Women's League
- 2025/26: 1st
Home colours	Away colours	Third colours

Nsingizini Hotspurs Ladies F.C. is a women's football club based in Hluthi, Shiselweni Region, Eswatini. The team competes in the Eswatini Women's League, the top‑tier of Eswatini women's football.

== History ==
Women's football in Eswatini became formally structured with the establishment of the Eswatini Women's League in 2003, but Nsingizini Hotspurs Ladies only emerged as a competitive force much later. The club gradually built a women's program aligned with the men’s team's growth, participating in regional competitions and developing players who would later feature in the national league.

=== Rise in Domestic Competition (2023–2025) ===
Nsingizini Hotspurs Ladies began gaining national attention during the 2023–24 season, when forward Kudakwashe Basopo won the Golden Boot with 39 goals, signalling the club's growing competitiveness.

Their performances improved further in 2024–25, finishing strongly in the league and establishing themselves among the top women's teams in Eswatini. This period marked the beginning of a sustained rise that would culminate in their first national title.

=== First National Championship (2025–26) ===
The 2025–26 season was historic for the club. Nsingizini Hotspurs Ladies won the Eswatini Women's League for the first time, ending Young Buffaloes’ long‑standing dominance.The season also produced individual accolades including a golden ball for Siphelele Mpanza and top scorer award again for Zimbabwean player Kudakwashe Basopo who finished with 38 goals. Winning the league qualified Nsingizini Hotspurs Ladies for the CAF Women’s Champions League COSAFA qualifiers, marking their debut in continental women's club football.

=== Continental Debut (2026) ===
Nsingizini Hotspurs Ladies made their continental debut at the 2026 CAF Women’s Champions League COSAFA Qualifiers after qualifying as champions of the 2025–26 Eswatini Women's League. Drawn into Group B, they faced some of the region's strongest clubs, including Mamelodi Sundowns Ladies, Costa do Sol, and Silver Strikers. Their opening match resulted in a heavy defeat to Sundowns, who won 8–0, followed by a 3–1 loss to Costa do Sol. Nsingizini concluded their group campaign with a 5–1 defeat to Silver Strikers, finishing fourth in the group. Despite the challenging results, their participation marked a historic milestone as the club's first appearance in a CAF‑sanctioned women's competition, showcasing Eswatini's growing presence in regional women's football.

== Honours ==
- Eswatini Women's League: 2025/26

== Club records ==
=== CAF Women's Champions League COSAFA qualifiers record ===
Season	Pos	Record						
Season	Pos	P	W	D	L	F	A	GD
2026	8th place	3	0	0	3	2	(16)	(14)

== See also ==
- Eswatini Women's League
- CAF Women's Champions League
- COSAFA Women's Champions League
