= Gabonnelwe Kekana =

South African soccer player

Personal information
- Full name: Gabonnelwe Salome Kekana
- Date of birth: 22 September 1995 (age 31)
- Position: Forward

Team information
- Current team: Mamelodi Sundowns Ladies
- Number: 6

Senior career*
Years	Team	Apps	(Gls)
-2021	Tshwane University of Technology		
2022-	Mamelodi Sundowns Ladies		
- * Club domestic league appearances and goals

Gabonnelwe Salome Kekana (born 22 September 1995) is a South African soccer player who plays as a forward for SAFA Women's League club Mamelodi Sundowns.

== Club career ==
=== Tshwane University of Technology ===
Kekana played for Tshwane University of Technology and was part of the squad that won the 2019 Women's Varsity Football title.

=== Mamelodi Sundowns Ladies ===
In March 2022 she joined Tshwane rivals Mamelodi Sundowns Ladies. In the 2023 COSAFA Women's Champions League she scored the 7th goal in the 8–0 win against Olympic de Moroni from Comoros in the group stages. She was part of the squad that were runners up to AS FAR at the 2022 CAF Women's Champions League.

== Honours ==
Tshwane University of Technology

- Women's Varsity Football: 2019

Mamelodi Sundowns Ladies

- CAF Women's Champions League: Runners-Up: 2022
- COSAFA Women's Champions League: 2023
- SAFA Women's League: 2022, 2023
