= Lúcia Leila =

Mozambican footballer (born 1993)

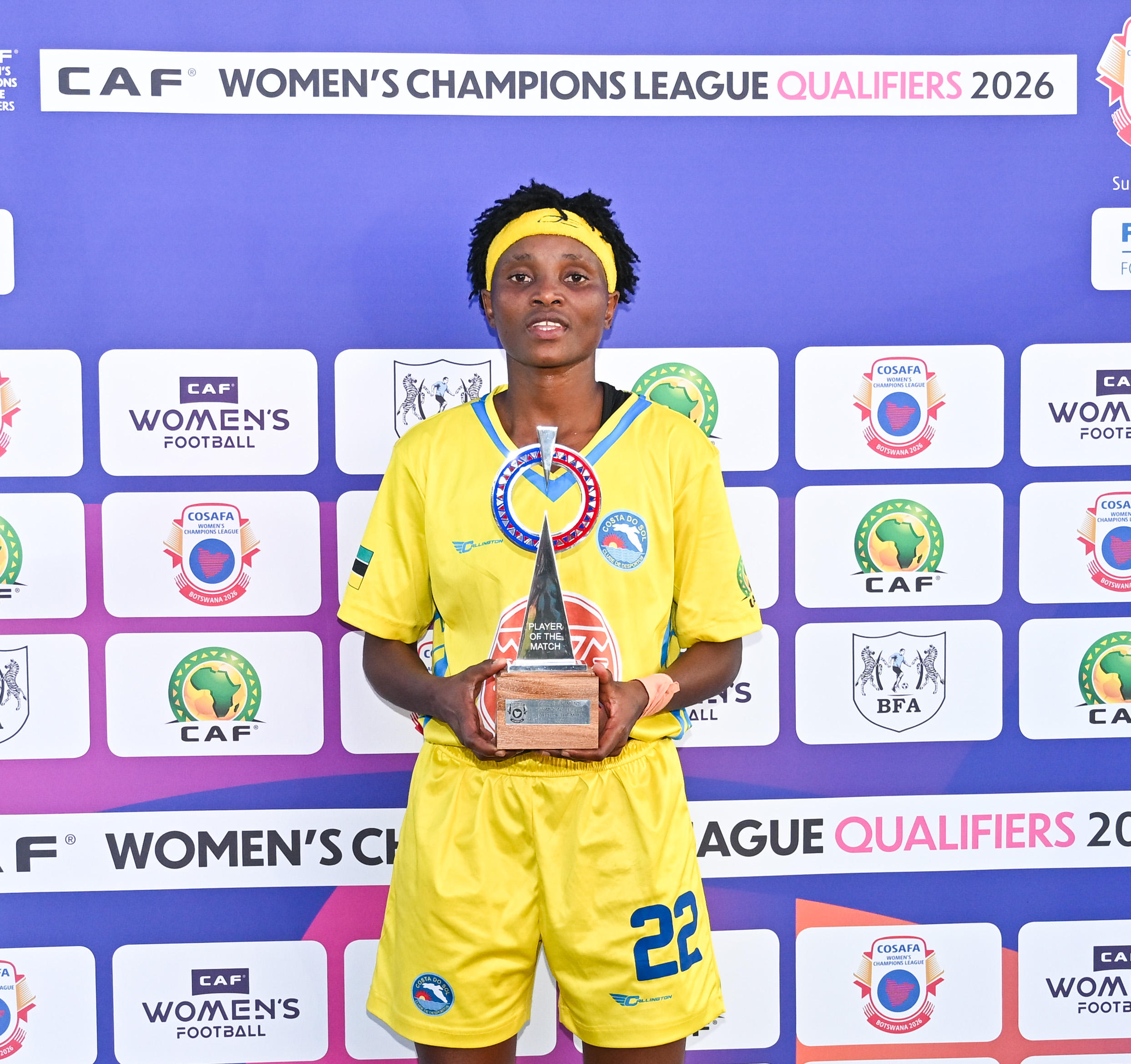
- Leila at the 2026 COSAFA WCL

Personal information
- Full name: Lúcia Leila José Moçambique
- Date of birth: 22 December 1993 (age 32)
- Height: 1.69 m (5 ft 7 in)
- Position: Forward

Team information
- Current team: Costa do Sol
- Number: 11

Senior career*
Years	Team	Apps	(Gls)
2012–2015	Paradise Maputo		
2015–2019	Cocoricó		
2020–2021	Atlético Ouriense	15	(3)
2021–2024	Boldklubben af 1893		
2024–2025	Hapoel Ra'anana	4	(4)
2026–	Costa do Sol	3	(4)

International career
–2013	Mozambique U20		
–	Mozambique		
- * Club domestic league appearances and goals as of 15 October 2024

Lúcia Leila José Moçambique (born 22 December 1993), known as Lúcia Leila, is a Mozambican footballer who plays as a defender for Mozambican Primera División femenina club Costa do Soland the Mozambique national team.

== Club career ==
Lúcia Leila has played for Atlético Ouriense in Portugal. She also played for Denmark's B93 from 2021 to 2024.

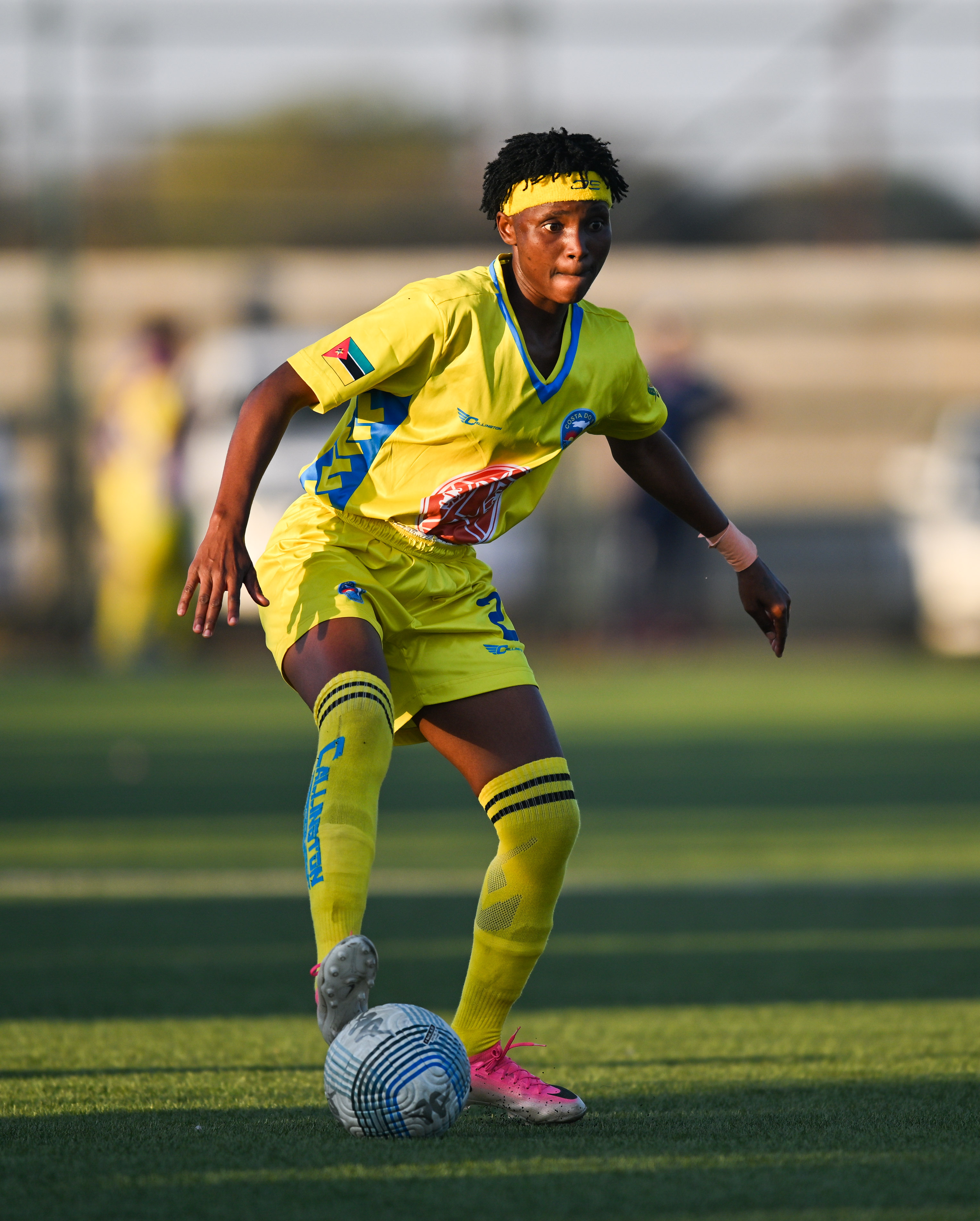
Leila with Costa do Sol in 2026

She made a move to Israel and played for Hapoel Raanana during the 2024/2025 season. She returned to Mozambique and signed with Costa do Sol for the 2025/26 season. She scored 4 goals in the 2026 CAF Women's Champions League qualifiers for the team.

== International career ==
Lúcia Leila capped for Mozambique at senior level during four COSAFA Women's Championship editions (2017, 2018, 2019 and 2021). In 2023, she helped the national team win the bronze medal with her goal being the opening goal in a 2–0 win over Zimbabwe.
