= Ninika =

Mozambican footballer (born 1998)

Personal information
- Full name: Cidália Daniel Cuta
- Date of birth: 27 October 1998 (age 28)
- Place of birth: Maputo, Mozambique
- Height: 1.60 m (5 ft 3 in)
- Position: Forward

Team information
- Current team: Gokulam Kerala
- Number: 32

Senior career*
Years	Team	Apps	(Gls)
2015-2022	Costa do Sol	13	(34)
2022–2023	Young Buffaloes	5	(9)
2023–2024	Yanga Princess	3	(2)
2024–2025	Minsk	27	(23)
2025	AS FAR	15	(6)
2025	Etihad Club	0	(0)
2025–	Gokulam Kerala	5	(1)

International career^{‡}
2018–	Mozambique	16	(6)
- * Club domestic league appearances and goals as of 30 September 2026 ‡ National team caps and goals as of 9 April 2025.

Cidália Daniel Cuta (born 27 October 1998), known as Ninika, is a Mozambican footballer who plays as a forward for Indian club Gokulam Kerala and the Mozambique women's national team.

== Club career ==
Ninika has played for Costa do Sol in Mozambique.

== International career ==
Ninika capped for Mozambique at senior level during the 2018 and 2021 COSAFA Women's Championships.

== Honours ==
Young Buffaloes

- Eswatini Women's League: 2023

FC Minsk

- Belarusian Women's Super Cup: 2024

AS FAR

- Moroccan Women's Championship: 2025
- Moroccan Women Throne Cup: 2024
