= Asanda Hadebe =

South African professional soccer player

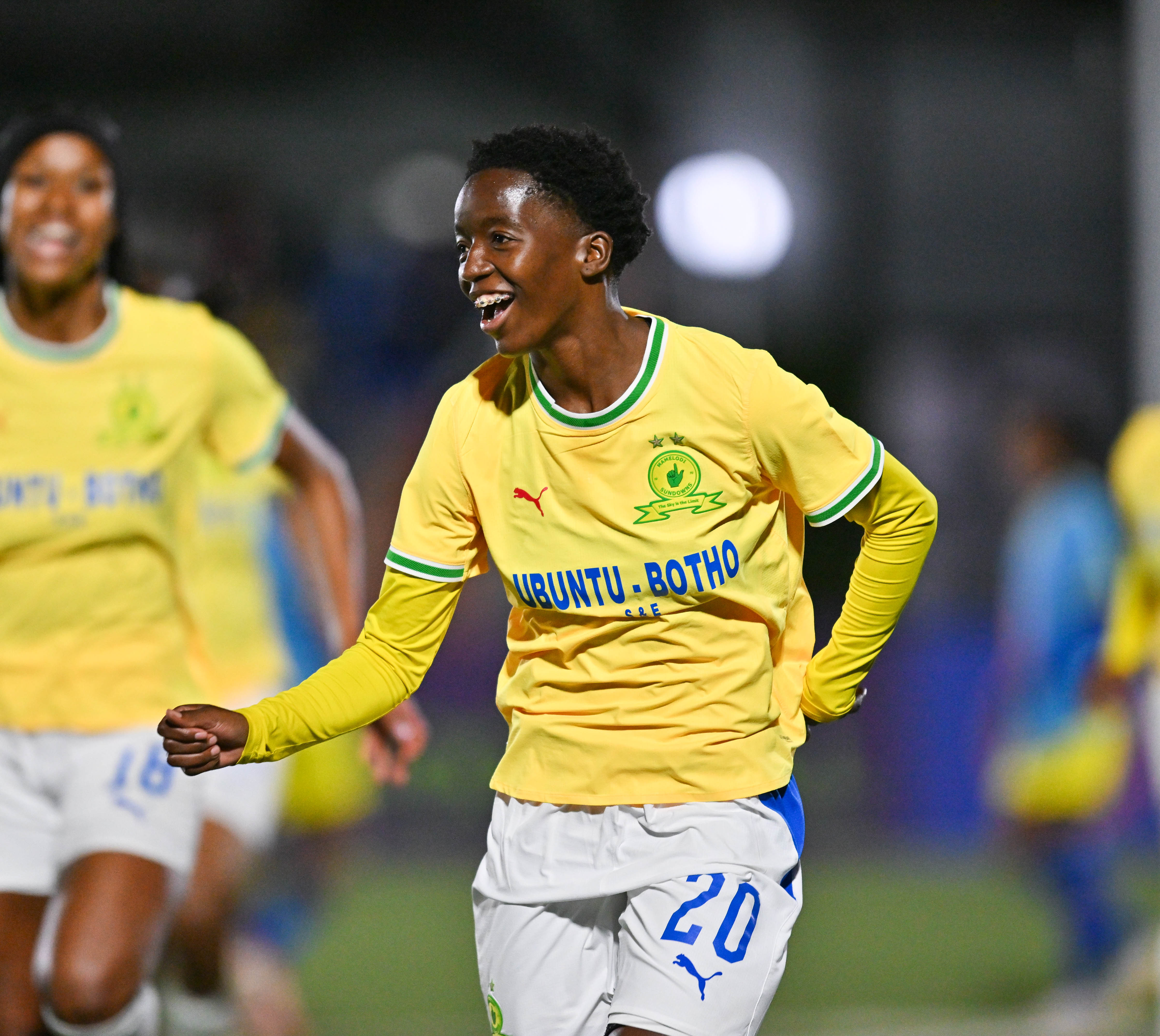
- Hadebe in 2026

Personal information
- Date of birth: 13 October 2003 (age 23)
- Place of birth: Mpumalanga, KwaZulu-Natal, South Africa
- Position: Defender

Team information
- Current team: Mamelodi Sundowns Ladies
- Number: 20

Youth career
- –2023: Sunflower F.C.

Senior career*
Years	Team	Apps	(Gls)
2024–	Mamelodi Sundowns Ladies		

International career
2021–	South Africa		
Medal record
Representing South Africa
COSAFA Women's Championship
Silver medal – second place	2025 South Africa
COSAFA Women's Champions League
Gold medal – first place	2026 Botswana
- * Club domestic league appearances and goals

Asanda Hadebe (born 13 October 2003) is a South African soccer player who plays as a defender for SAFA Women's League club Mamelodi Sundowns and the South Africa women's national team.

== Playing career ==
=== Sunflower ===
Hadebe was captain of the Sasol Women's League side Sunflowers F.C.

=== Mamelodi Sundowns Ladies ===
In March 2024, she joined SAFA Women's League side Mamelodi Sundowns Ladies.

She made her debut in a 7-0 win against Lindelani Ladies on 14 April 2024.

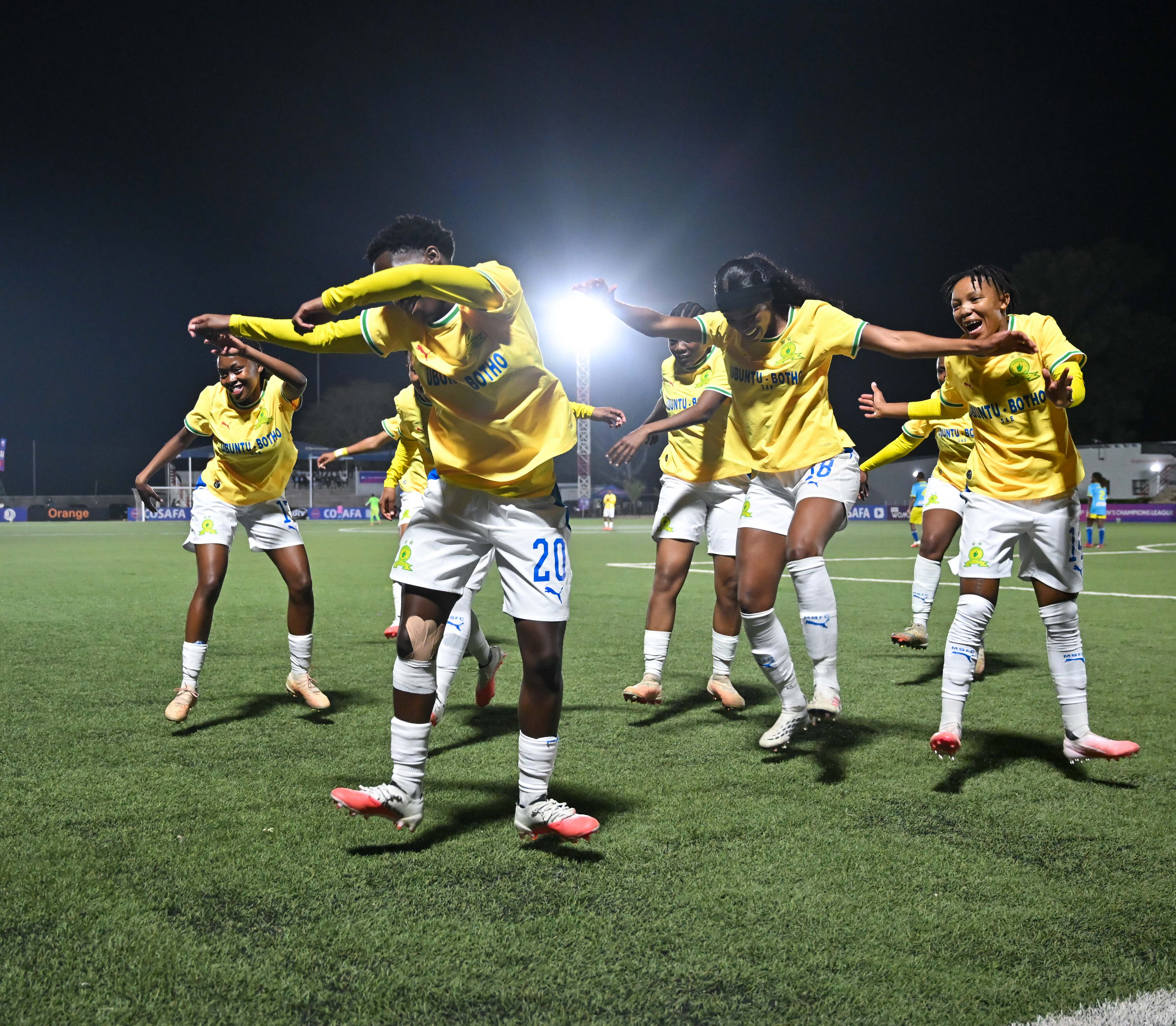
Hadebe celebrating woth teammates after scoring a goal

Hadebe scored her first goal in a 5-0 away game win against Richmond United when she opened the scoring in the 32nd minute on 20 April 2024. She scored her second goal for Sundowns Ladies in the 7-1 win over City Lads on 1 May 2024. Hadebe made her senior debut during the 2022 Women's Africa Cup of Nations Qualifiers against Mozambique in October 2021 at the age of 16 providing an assist on debut.

== Honours ==
Mamelodi Sundowns Ladies

- COSAFA Women's Champions League: 2026
