= Double Action Ladies F.C. =

Botswana women's football team

Double Action Ladies
- Full name: Double Action Ladies Football Club
- Founded: 1995; 31 years ago
- Heach Coach: (Botswana) Oupa Kowa
- League: Botswana Women's Championship

The Double Action Ladies F.C. is a women's soccer club based in Gaborone, Botswana. The team competes in the Botswana Women's Championship, the top tier women's football league in Botswana.

== History ==
Founded in 1995, the club finished as the runner-up in the Botswana Women's Championship before winning the next three editions. When the Botswana Women's Championship resumed in 2005, the club clinched nine consecutive titles before relinquishing its crown to Township Rollers in 2015.

=== COSAFA Women's Champions League 2021 ===
In 2021, the club represented Botswana in the inaugural edition of the COSAFA Women's Champions League, replacing Prisons XI after their withdrawal due to financial reasons. They won their first match at the 2021 COSAFA Women's Champions League 3-0 against Manzini Warriors from Eswatini. In their second match, they lost 6-0 to Mamelodi Sundowns Ladies from South Africa. They ended group B as runners-up after winning 6-0 against Lesotho Defence Force Ladies from Lesotho. The club reached the semifinals of the zonal tournament. They lost their semi-final 2-0 Black Rhino Queens from Zimbabwe.

=== Botswana Women's Championship 2022 ===
In the following season, as the championship resumed after several years of interruption, Double Action secured their thirteenth title by defeating Mexican Girls 4-2 in the final.

=== COSAFA Women's Champions League 2022 ===
They opened their 2022 COSAFA Women's Champions League with a 1-1 draw with Mamelodi Sundowns Ladies from South Africa. They won their second match 2-0 over CD Costa do Sol from Mozambique. They tied group A with 4 points but goal difference meant they would contest the bronze medal match. They finished third overall after winning 3-0 against Olympic de Moroni from Comoros. The team also walked away with the fair play award.

=== Botswana Women's Championship 2023 ===
They won the 2023 championship with a 1-0 win over Gaborone United Ladies.

=== COSAFA Women's Champions League 2023 ===
They started the 2023 COSAFA Women's Champions League with a 1-1 draw with Green Buffaloes from Zambia. They won their second match against Lesotho Defence Force Ladies from Lesotho 1-0. They went on to top group A after a 4-0 win over Ntopwa from Malawi. They won their semi-final 2-0 against CD Costa do Sol from Mozambique. They lost the final 2-0 to Mamelodi Sundowns Ladies from South Africa. They won the fair play award for the second year in a row.

== Honours ==
Type	Competition	Titles	Winning Seasons	Runners-up
Domestic	Botswana Women's Championship	14	1999, 2000, 2001, 2006, 2007, 2008, 2009, 2010, 2011, 2012, 2013, 2014, 2022, 2023.	1998, 2015, 2016
Domestic	Botswana Women's Cup	0		
African	COSAFA Women's Champions League	0		2023

COSAFA Women's Champions League Fair play award: 2022, 2023

== See also ==
- Botswana Women's Championship
- Botswana Women's Cup
- CAF Women's Champions League
- Gaolethoo Nkutlwisang
