= Khutso Pila =

South African soccer player (born 2000)

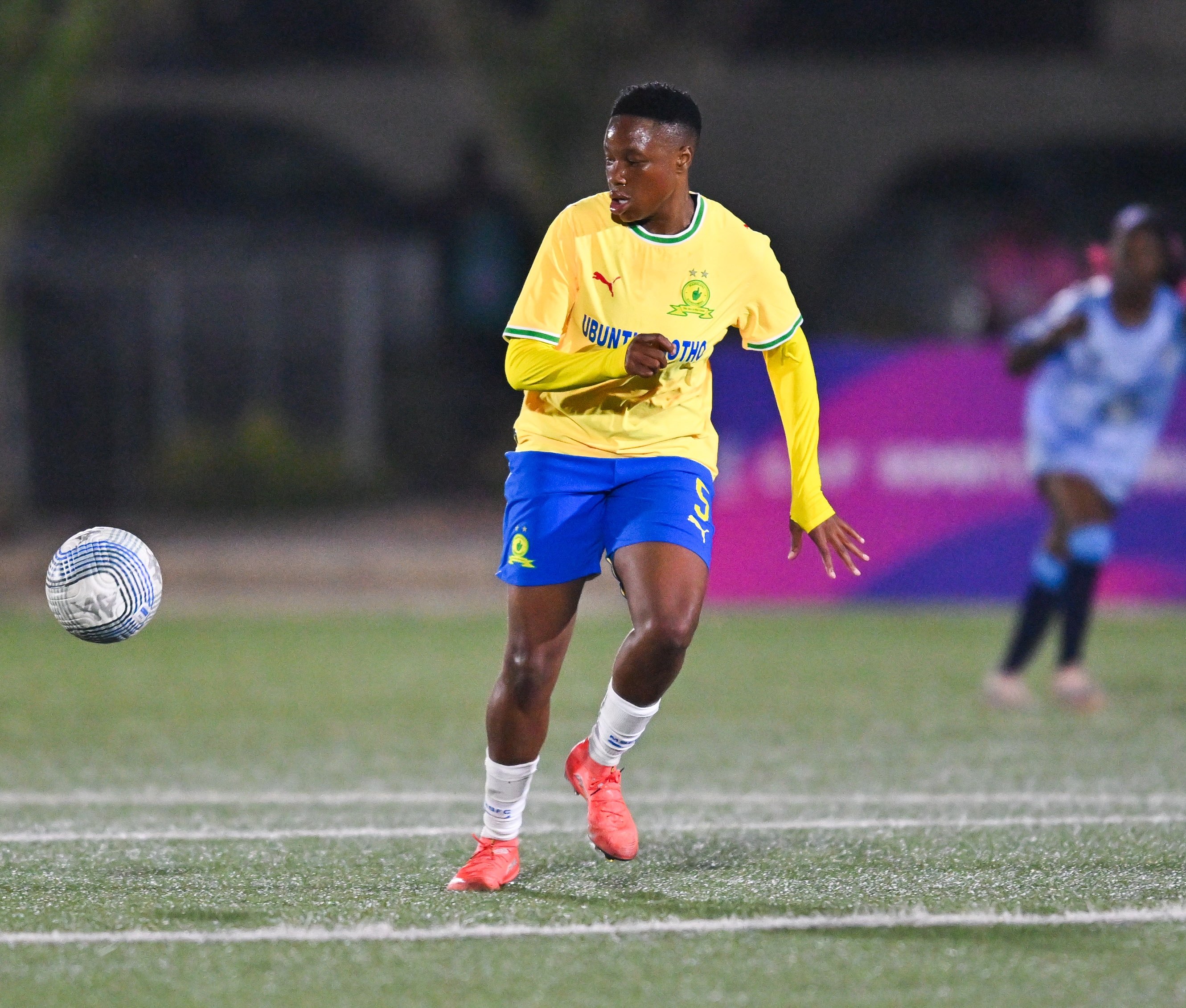
- Pila in 2026

Personal information
- Date of birth: 31 May 2000 (age 26)
- Position: Defender

Team information
- Current team: University of Pretoria
- Number: 12

Youth career
- –: Rosina Sedibana

College career
Years	Team	Apps	(Gls)
2022–2023	University of Pretoria		

Senior career*
Years	Team	Apps	(Gls)
2024–	Mamelodi Sundowns Ladies		

International career
2024–	South Africa	2	(0)
Medal record
COSAFA Women's Champions League
Gold medal – first place	2026 Botswana
- * Club domestic league appearances and goals

Khutso Pila (born 31 May 2000) is a South African soccer player who plays as a midfielder for SAFA Women's League club Tuks Ladies and the South Africa women's national team.

== Playing career ==
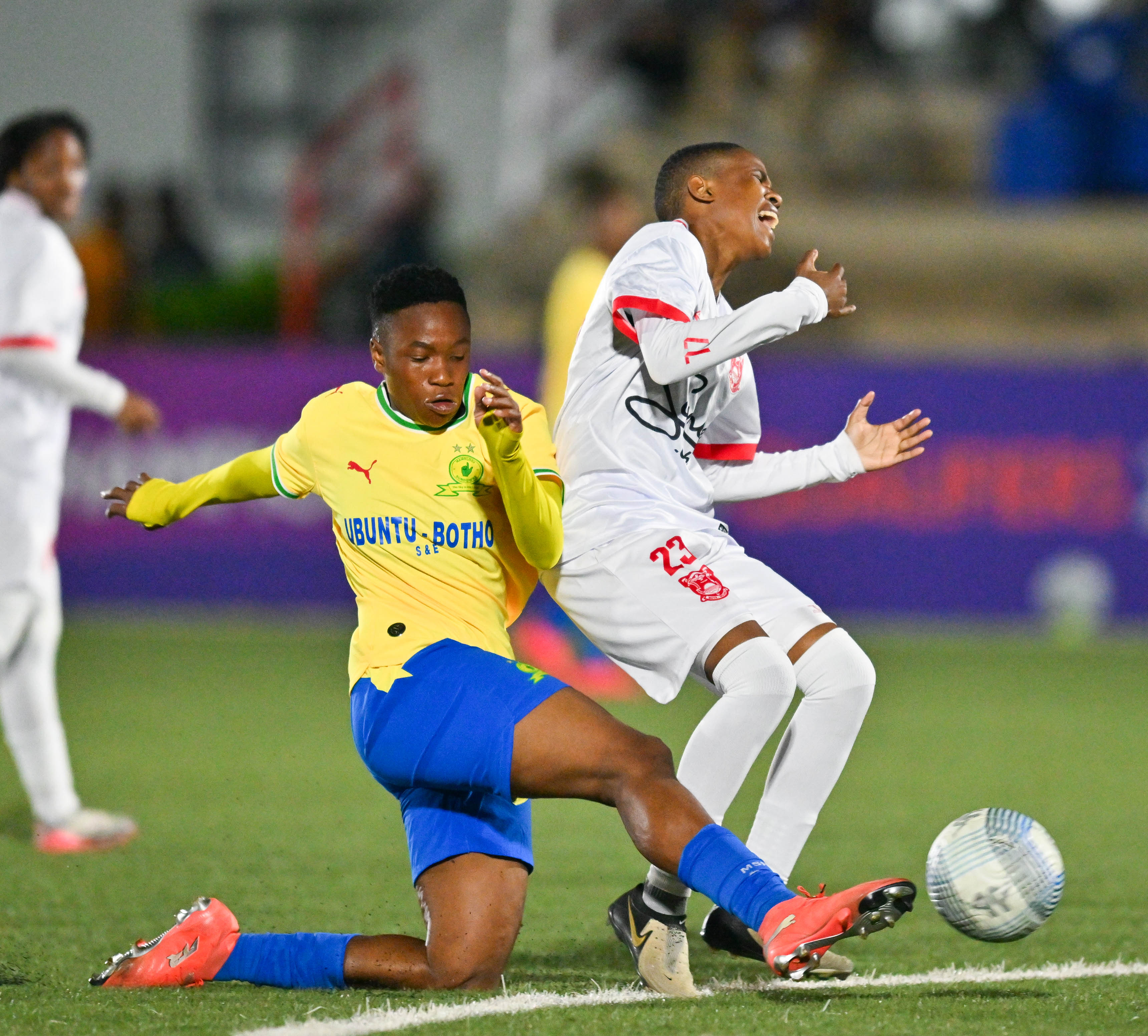
Pila at the 2026 CAF Women's Champions League COSAFA Qualifiers against Gaborone United

Pila previsouly played for Tuks Ladies. She returned to parent club Mamelodi Sundowns Ladies in 2024.

Pila competed for the senior women's national team at the 2024 COSAFA Women's Championship.

== Honours ==
Mamelodi Sundowns Ladies

- COSAFA Women's Champions League: 2026
