= Andile Dlamini =

South African soccer player (born 1992)

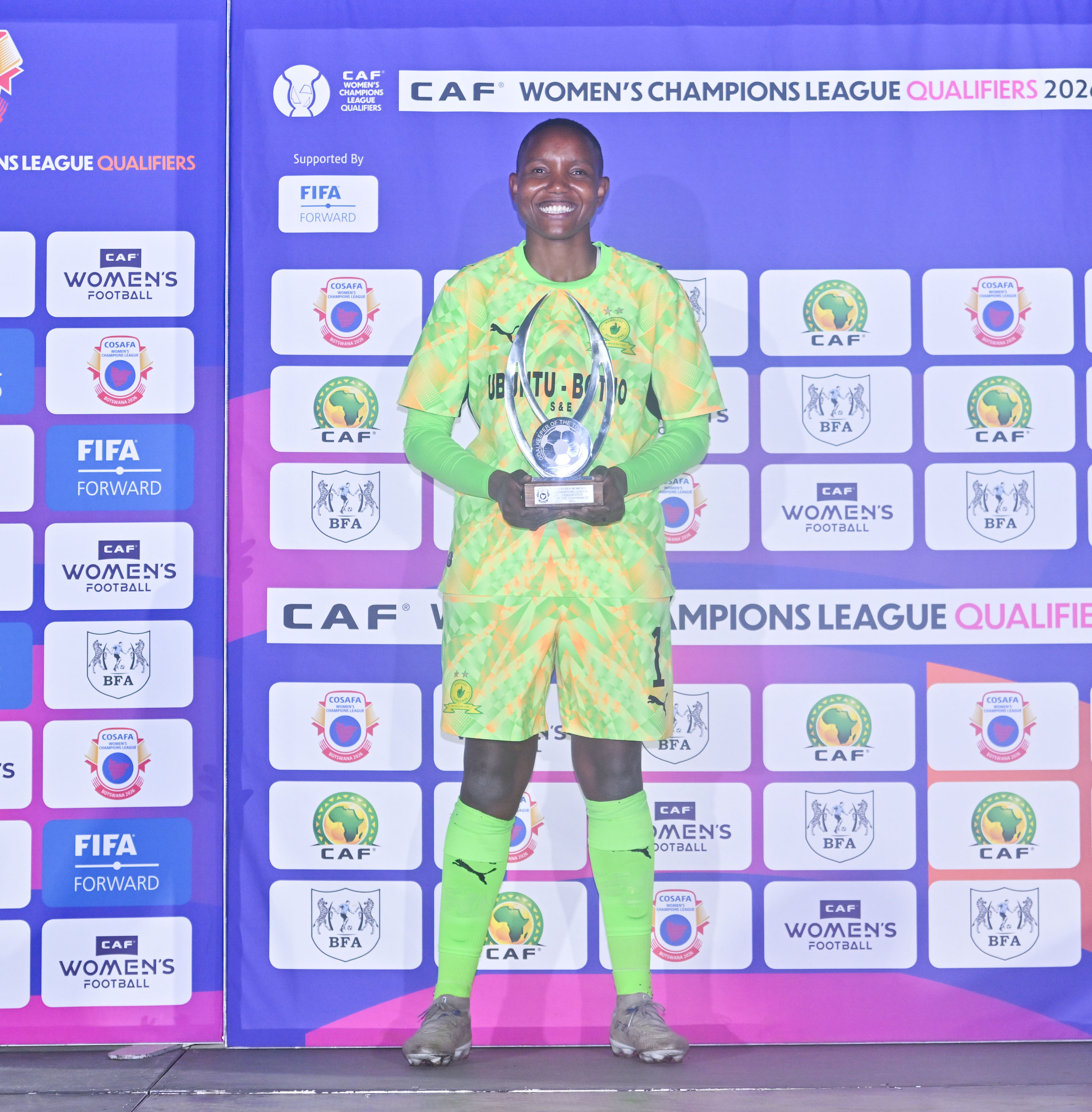
- Dlamini in 2026

Personal information
- Date of birth: 2 September 1992 (age 34)
- Place of birth: Tembisa, South Africa
- Position: Goalkeeper

Team information
- Current team: Mamelodi Sundowns
- Number: 16

Youth career
- –2010: Phomolong Ladies

Senior career*
Years	Team	Apps	(Gls)
2010–	Mamelodi Sundowns		

International career^{‡}
2011–	South Africa	69	(0)
Medal record
Representing South Africa
Women's Africa Cup of Nations
Second place	2012 Equatorial Guinea
Second place	2018 Ghana
First place	2022 Morocco
CAF Women's Champions League
Gold medal – first place	2021 Egypt
Silver medal – second place	2022 Morocco
Gold medal – first place	2023 Côte d'Ivoire
COSAFA Women's Champions League
Gold medal – first place	2021 South Africa
Silver medal – second place	2022 South Africa
Gold medal – first place	2023 South Africa
Gold medal – first place	2026 Botswana
- * Club domestic league appearances and goals ‡ National team caps and goals as of 20 July 2023 (prior the 2023 FIFA Women's World Cup)

Andile ‘Sticks’ Dlamini (born 2 September 1992) is a South African soccer player who plays as a goalkeeper for SAFA Women's League club Mamelodi Sundowns and the South Africa women's national team.

== Personal life ==
Dlamini was born on the 2nd of September 1992 in Thembisa, a township in Johannesburg, South Africa. She is a Christian, and reads the bible to prepare for football matches. She was close to her stepfather Rhodes Hattingh who died in 2025. She married Lulama Mokuni on 20 December 2025.

== Club career ==
Andile Dlamini took up professional football after playing against the South Africa women's national under-20 football team; she was subsequently selected for the team. Nicknamed "Sticks", she previously played for Phomolong Ladies.

=== Mamelodi Sundowns Ladies ===
Dlamini joined Sundowns Ladies in 2010.

In September 2021, she was part of the team that won the 2021 COSAFA Women's Champions League. In November 2021, they won the inaugural CAF Women's Champions League. Dlamini was award goal keeper of the tournament and made it to the team of the tournament.

In 2022, the team were runner's up for the 2022 COSAFA Women's Champions League and the 2022 CAF Women's Champions League.

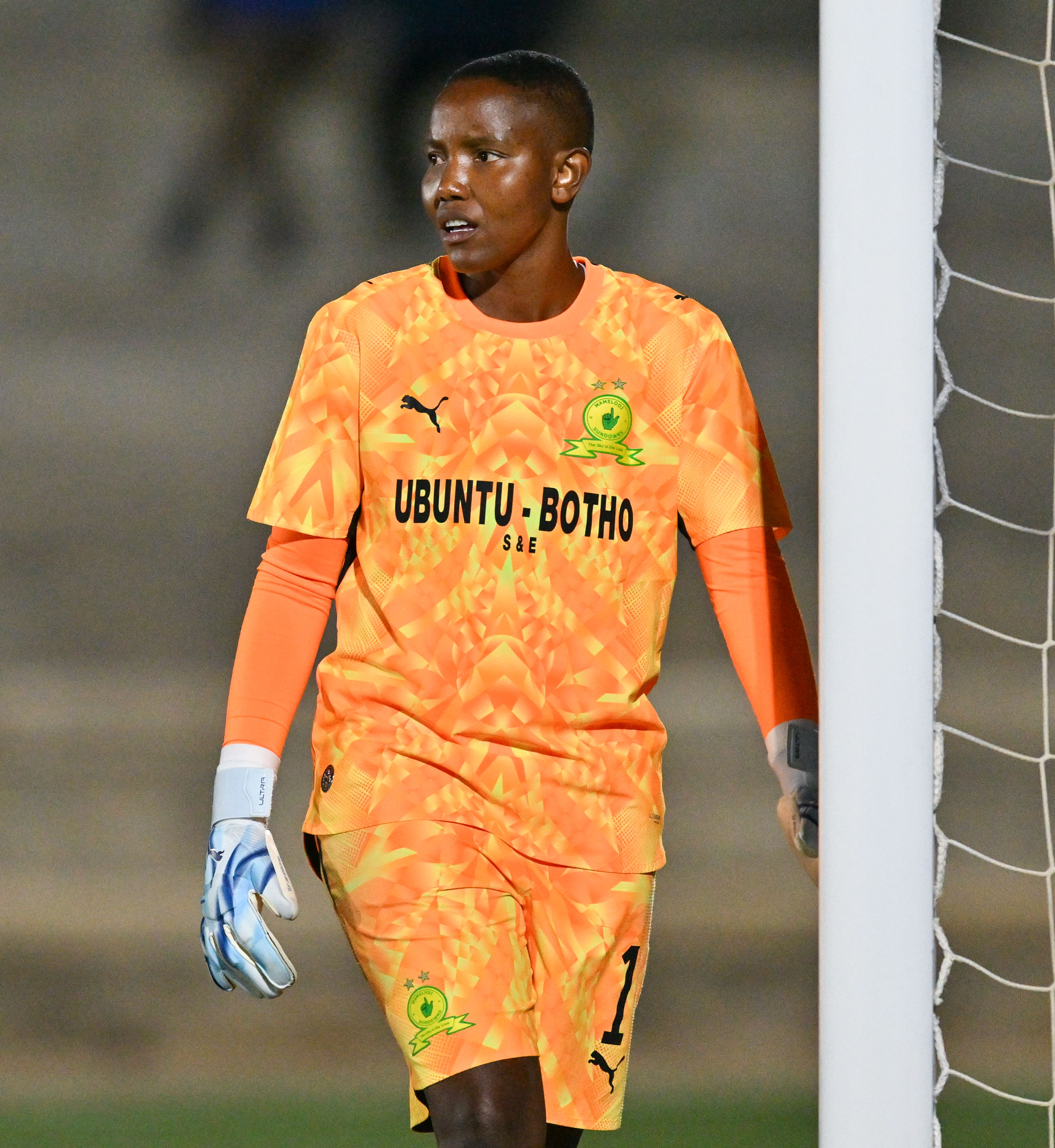
Dlamini at the 2026 CAF Women's Champions League COSAFA Qualifiers against Gaborone United Ladies S.C.

In September 2023, they won the 2023 COSAFA Women's Champions League with Dlamini winning goal keeper of the tournament. In November 2023, they won the 2023 CAF Women's Champions league for the second time with Dlamini winning goal keeper of the tournament and making it into the team of the tournament again.

== International career ==
She made her first appearance for the South Africa women's national football team against Botswana in 2011. Dlamini has routinely been the reserve goalkeeper for the team, with Thokozile Mndaweni and Roxanne Barker taking the first time spots. This has meant that although Dlamini has been named to the squads of both the 2012 Summer Olympics in London, United Kingdom, and the 2016 Summer Olympics in Rio de Janeiro, Brazil, she did not play any time at all during either tournaments. She was disappointed when South Africa were eliminated from the 2015 All Africa Games in the first round through a drawing after each team in the group stage drew all their games.

Following the arrival of coach Desiree Ellis, it was suggested that Dlamini could have a better chance of becoming the first choice goalkeeper, especially after Barker was released later than expected for friendlies and the 2016 Africa Women Cup of Nations tournament.

She starred in the 2022 Women's Africa Cup of Nations where the team won their maiden continental title and was named the goal keeper of the tournament.

In the 2024 Women's Africa Cup of Nations she helped the team reach the semi-finals in the penalty shootout against Senegal after the match ended in a goalless draw. Dlamini saved two penalties.

=== International clean sheets ===
No.	Date	Venue	Opponent	Result	Competition
1.	3 June 2025	Lucas Moripe Stadium, Pretoria, South Africa	Zambia	2–0	Three Nations Challenge
2.	7 July 2025	Honneur Stadium, Oujda, Morocco	Ghana	2–0	2024 Women's Africa Cup of Nations
3.	14 July 2025	Honneur Stadium, Oujda, Morocco	Mali	4–0	2024 Women's Africa Cup of Nations
4.	28 October 2025	Dobsonville Stadium, Dobsonville, South Africa	DR Congo	1–0	2026 Women's Africa Cup of Nations qualification
5.	30 November 2025	Stade Prince Moulay Abdallah, Rabat, Morocco	Morocco	2–0	Friendly

== Music ==
She appeared in season 2 of The Masked Singer South Africa as Rainbow where she was the seventh contestant unmasked.

== Honours ==
South Africa

- Women's Africa Cup of Nations: 2022; runners-up: 2012, 2018

Mamelodi Sundowns Ladies

- CAF Women's Champions League: 2021, 2023; runners-up: 2022
- COSAFA Women's Champions League: 2021, 2023, 2026; runners-up: 2022
- SAFA Women's League: 2020, 2021, 2022, 2023, 2024, 2025

Individual

- 2013 Sasol League National Championship: Best Goalkeeper
- 2019–20 SAFA Women's League: Goal Keeper of the Season
- 2021 CAF Women's Champions League: Best Goalkeeper
- 2022 Women's Africa Cup of Nations:Team of the Tournament
- 2022 IFFHS CAF Women's Team of The Year
- 2022 Gauteng Sports Personality of the Year
- 2022 Gauteng Women in Sports Sportswoman of the Year
- 2022 Tshwane Sports Women of the Year
- 2023 Momentum Athlete of the Year
- Feather Awards Sports Personality of the Year: 2023
- CAF Women's Champions League Team of the Tournament: 2023
- 2023 CAF Women's Champions League Best Goalkeeper
- CAF Team of the Year Women's XI: 2023, 2024
- 2026 COSAFA Women's Champions League: Best Keeper
