= Lelona Daweti =

South African soccer player

Personal information
- Full name: Lelona Daweti
- Date of birth: 8 September 1999 (age 27)
- Height: 1.52 m (5 ft 0 in)
- Position: Attacking midfielder

Team information
- Current team: Mamelodi Sundowns
- Number: 21

Youth career
- 2017–2021: Cape Town Roses

Senior career*
Years	Team	Apps	(Gls)
2022–	Mamelodi Sundowns		

International career
2017	South Africa U20		(2)
2022–	South Africa		
Medal record
CAF Women's Champions League
Silver medal – second place	2022 Morocco
COSAFA Women's Champions League
Silver medal – second place	2022 South Africa
Gold medal – first place	2023 South Africa
Representing South Africa
COSAFA Women's Championship
Silver medal – second place	2022 South Africa
- * Club domestic league appearances and goals

Lelona "Kokota Lelo" Daweti (born 8 September 1999) is a South African soccer player who plays as a forward for SAFA Women's League club Mamelodi Sundowns and the South African women's national team.

== Club career ==
=== Mamelodi Sundowns Ladies ===
She joined SAFA Women's League side Mamelodi Sundowns in South Africa and was part of the team that were runner's up for the 2022 COSAFA Women's Champions League and the 2022 CAF Women's Champions League

She was added to the 2022 CAF Women's Champions League Best XI. Later in the year she won the SAFA Women's League title with Sundowns.

In 2023, she was part of the team that won the 2023 COSAFA Women's Champions League. Daweti was joint top scorer at the tournament with 3 goals. She suffered an injury that ruled her out for the remainder of the season.

== International career ==
In 2017, she was selected in the Basetsana squad for the U-20 World Cup Qualifiers.

In 2022, Daweti competed for the South Africa women's national soccer team at the 2022 COSAFA Women's Championship where they were runner's up to Zambia.

== Honours ==
South Africa

- COSAFA Women's Championship runners-up: 2022

Mamelodi Sundowns Ladies

- CAF Women's Champions League runners-up: 2022
- COSAFA Women's Champions League: 2023
- SAFA Women's League: 2022, 2023, 2024, 2025

Individual

- 2022 CAF Women's Champions League: Best XI
- 2023 COSAFA Women's Champions League: Top scorer (3 goals)
