= Mamelodi High School =

Secondary school in Tshwane, South Africa

Coordinates: 25.7106°S 28.3639°E

Mamelodi High School, also called Mamelodi Secondary School, is a high school in Mamelodi township, Tshwane, South Africa. The school was founded in 1956 under the Department of Bantu Education of the Apartheid regime. In the 1960s it was one of only two post-primary schools in Mamelodi. The medium of instruction was Afrikaans, until the Soweto uprising in 1976, when it changed to English.

== Notable alums ==
- The Umkhonto we Sizwe operative Solomon Mahlangu attended Mamelodi High School until Standard 8 (grade 10).
- Hlogi Mash
