= Mozambican Primera División femenina =

Highest division of league competition for Mozambique women's football

- Founded: 2002; 24 years ago
- Country: Mozambique
- Confederation: CAF
- Number of clubs: 21
- Level on pyramid: 1
- International cup(s): COSAFA Women's Champions League; CAF Women's Champions League
- Current champions: CD Costa do Sol (4th title) (2025)
- Most championships: CD Costa do Sol (4 titles)
- Website: www.fmf.co.mz

The Mozambican Primera División femenina is the highest level of league competition for women's football in Mozambique. It is the women's equivalent of the men's Moçambola. Starting with the 2021, the league champion will qualify for the COSAFA Women's Champions League.

== History ==
The competition is structured across three regional zones North, Central, and South with each comprising nine participating teams. The teams compete in a round‑robin format, with every club playing a total of eight matches, divided evenly between home and away fixtures.

== Champions ==
The list of champions and runners-up:

| Year | Champions | Runners-up |
|---|---|---|
| 2002 | | |
| 2003 | | |
| 2004 | | |
| 2005 | ECMEP da Beira | Porto da Matola |
| 2006 | Futebol Clube da Matola | ECMEP da Beira |
| 2007 | Porto da Matola | ECMEP da Beira |
| 2008 | | |
| 2009 | Clube Desportivo Fanta | |
| 2010 | | Clube Desportivo Fanta |
| 2011 | Cancelled | |
| 2012 | Porto da Matola | Clube Paradise |
| 2013 | União Desportiva de Lichinga | Clube Desportivo Cocorico |
| 2014 | Clube Desportivo Cocorico | Porto Carga da Beira |
| 2015 | | |
| 2016 | Clube Desportivo Cocorico | Benfica da Beira |
| 2017 | Benfica da Beira | Clube Desportivo Cocorico |
| 2018 | Clube Desportivo Cocorico | Clube de Desportos Costa do Sol |
| 2019 | Clube de Desportos Costa do Sol | Clube Desportivo Cocorico |
| 2020 | Cancelled due to COVID-19 pandemic in Mozambique | |
| 2021 | Cancelled due to COVID-19 pandemic in Mozambique | |
| 2022 | Clube de Desportos Costa do Sol | Clube Desportivo Cocorico |
| 2023 | União Desportiva de Lichinga | Clube de Desportos Costa do Sol |
| 2024 | Clube de Desportos Costa do Sol | União Desportiva de Lichinga |
| 2025 | Clube de Desportos Costa do Sol | |
