= Melinda Kgadiete =

South African professional soccer player

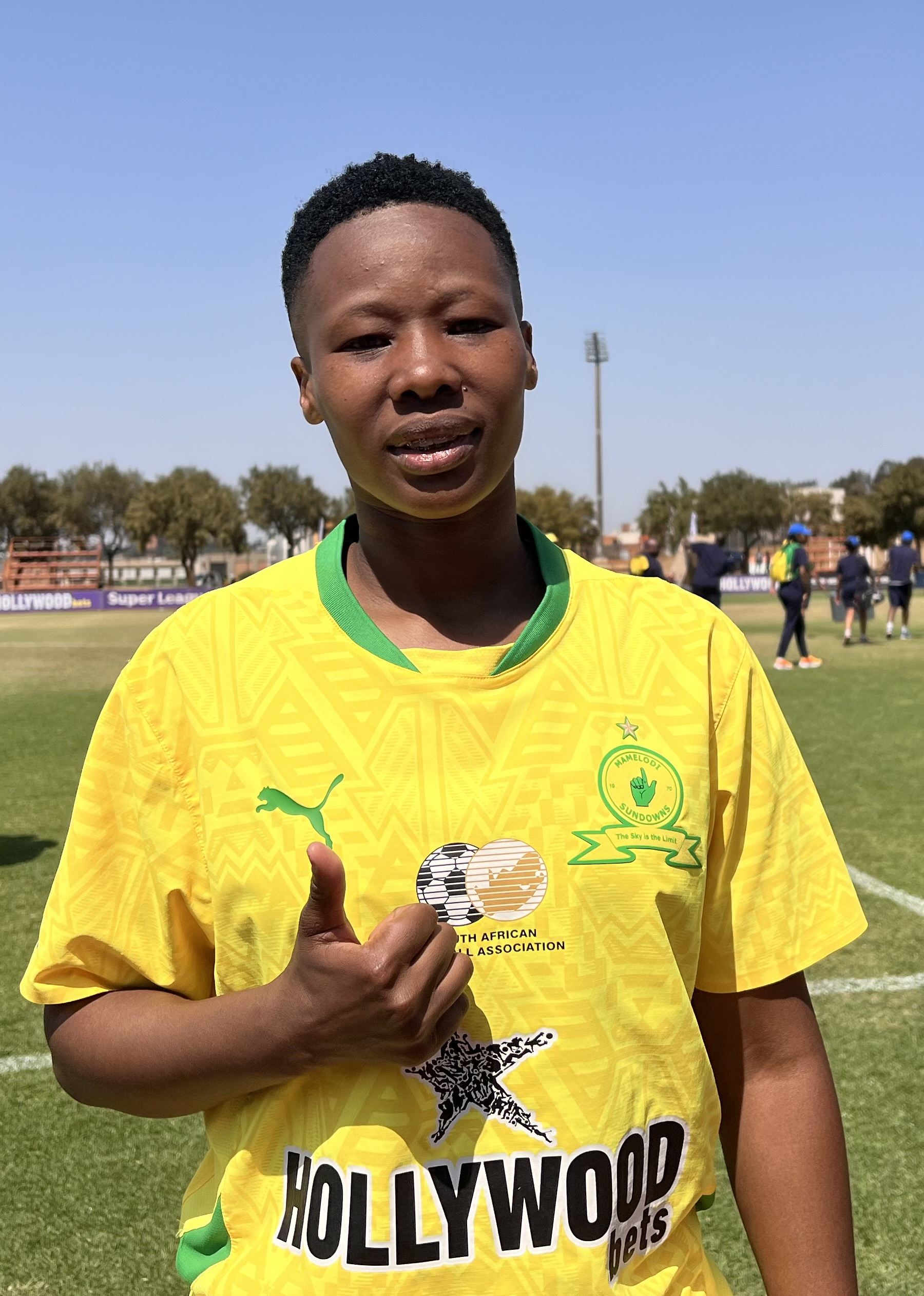
- Kgadiete at the UJ Soweto Stadium in 2024

Personal information
- Date of birth: 21 July 1992 (age 34)
- Position: Attacking midfielder

Team information
- Current team: Mamelodi Sundowns
- Number: 11

Senior career*
Years	Team	Apps	(Gls)
2021–	Mamelodi Sundowns		

International career^{‡}
2018–	South Africa	26	(3)
Medal record
Representing South Africa
Women's Africa Cup of Nations
Second place	2018 Ghana
First place	2022 Morocco
CAF Women's Champions League
Gold medal – first place	2021 Egypt
Silver medal – second place	2022 Morocco
Gold medal – first place	2023 Côte d'Ivoire
COSAFA Women's Champions League
Gold medal – first place	2021 South Africa
Silver medal – second place	2022 South Africa
Gold medal – first place	2023 South Africa
- * Club domestic league appearances and goals ‡ National team caps and goals as of 20 July 2023 (prior the 2023 FIFA Women's World Cup)

Melinda Kgadiete (born 21 July 1992) is a South African professional soccer player who plays as an attacking midfielder for SAFA Women's League club Mamelodi Sundowns and the South African women's national team.

== Club career ==
=== Bloemfontein Celtics Ladies ===
Kgadiete was part of the Bloemfontein Celtics Ladies squad that won the 2017 Sasol League National Championship with her scoring a brace to help the team win 2-0 against Cape Town Roses in the final held in Mbombela.

=== Mamelodi Sundowns Ladies ===
In 2021, she joined SAFA Women's League side Mamelodi Sundowns and was part of the team that won the 2021 COSAFA Women's Champions League. She was the top scorer at the inaugural COSAFA Women's Champions League with 5 goals.

In the 2021 CAF Women's Champions League, Kgadiete scored the winning goal in the first match against Vihiga Queens from Kenya. The club went on to win the inaugural CAF Women's Champions League held in Egypt. The club completed their treble by winning the 2021 Hollywoodbets Super League.

She was a runner-up for the 2022 COSAFA Women's Champions League with Kgadiete scoring 3 goals in the tournament and named Player of the Tournament. The club reached their second consecutive CAF Women's Champions League final and were runner's up to AS FAR in the 2022 CAF Women's Champions League. Kgadiete contributed two goals in the tournament. In November, Sundowns Ladies were crowned 2022 Hollywoodbets Super League champions for the third successive time.

In 2023, she won the 2023 COSAFA Women's Champions League and the 2023 CAF Women's Champions League with Sundowns Ladies. Kgadiete scored the winner in the second CAF Women's Champions League group stage match against SCC Casablanca. In December, they completed the treble by winning the 2023 Hollywoodbets Super League. Kgadiete scored 14 goals in 22 appearances.

== International career ==
Kgadiete competed for the South Africa women's national soccer team at the 2018 Africa Women Cup of Nations were they finished in second place.

She was part of the South African women's national team at the 2022 Women's Africa Cup of Nations where they won their first continental title and the 2023 FIFA Women's World cup where they reached the last 16.

== Honours ==
Club

Bloemfontein Celtics Ladies

- Sasol League National Championship: 2017

Mamelodi Sundowns Ladies

- SAFA Women's League: 2021, 2022, 2023
- CAF Women's Champions League: 2021, 2023 runner-up: 2022
- COSAFA Women's Champions League: 2021, 2023 runner-up: 2022

South Africa

- Women's Africa Cup of Nations: 2022, runner-up: 2018

Individual

- 2021 COSAFA Women's Champions League: Top goal scorer (5 goals)
- 2022 COSAFA Women's Champions League: Player of the Tournament
