= Eswatini Women's League =

Highest division of league competition for Eswatini women's football

- Founded: 2003; 23 years ago
- Country: Eswatini
- Confederation: CAF
- Number of clubs: 12
- Level on pyramid: 1
- Domestic cup: Women's Ingwenyama Cup
- International cup: CAF Champions League
- Current champions: Nsingizini Hotspurs Ladies F.C. (1st title) (2025–26)
- Most championships: Muchachas FC (7 titles)
- Top scorer: Celiwe Nkambule (155 goals)

The Eswatini Women's League is the highest level of league competition for women's football in Eswatini. It is the women's equivalent of the men's Premier League of Eswatini.

From 2021, the league champion will qualify for the COSAFA Women's Champions League.

== Champions ==
The list of champions and runners-up:

| Year | Champions | Runners-up |
|---|---|---|
| 2004 | Kappa Ladies FC | Manzini Wanderers |
| 2005 | Muchachas FC | Unknown |
| 2005/06 | Kappa Ladies FC | Unknown |
| 2006/07 | Muchachas FC | Unknown |
| 2007/08 | Muchachas FC | Unknown |
| 2008/09 | Muchachas FC | Unknown |
| 2009/10 | Muchachas FC | Imbabatane FC |
| 2010/11 | Muchachas FC | Young Buffaloes |
| 2011/12 | Mbabane Swallows | Young Buffaloes |
| 2012/13 | Mbabane Swallows | Manzini Wanderers |
| 2013/14 | Muchachas FC | Young Buffaloes |
| 2014/15 | Young Buffaloes | Manzini Wanderers |
| 2015/16 | Young Buffaloes | Unknown |
| 2016/17 | Manzini Wanderers | Young Buffaloes |
| 2017/18 | Manzini Wanderers | Unknown |
| 2018/19 | Young Buffaloes | Manzini Wanderers |
| 2019/20 | Not completed | |
| 2020/21 | Not held | |
| 2021/22 | Young Buffaloes | Royal Leopards |
| 2022/23 | Young Buffaloes | Royal Leopards |
| 2023/24 | Young Buffaloes | Manzini Wanderers |
| 2024/25 | Young Buffaloes | |
| 2025/26 | Nsingizini Hotspurs | Young Buffaloes |

Notes

the competition was not completed but the Eswatini Football Association submitted Manzini Wanderers as representatives for the 2021 CAF Women's Champions League as they were the leaders after 14 rounds.

== Awards ==
| Season | Golden Ball | Team | Golden Boot | Goals | Team | Golden Golve | Team |
|---|---|---|---|---|---|---|---|
| 2021/22 | | | (Eswatini) Celiwe Nkambule | 71 | Young Buffaloes | | |
| 2022/23 | | | (Eswatini) Celiwe Nkambule | 58 | Young Buffaloes | | |
| 2023/24 | | | (Eswatini) Smangele Skhondze | 36 | | | |
| 2024/25 | | | (Zimbabwe) Kudakwashe Basopo | 39 | Nsingizini Hotspur | | |
| 2025/26 | (Eswatini) Siphelele Mpanza | Nsingizini Hotspur | (Zimbabwe) Kudakwashe Basopo | 38 | Nsingizini Hotspur | (Eswatini) Lindelwa Gwebu | AS Interladies |
