= Grace Banwaa Buoadu =

Ghanaian footballer

Grace Banwaa Buoadu (born 15 January 2002 in Ghana) is a Ghanaian footballer as a goalkeeper. She is about 173 cm tall and weighs about 65kg.

Banwaa plays as goalkeeper for Hasaacas Ladies FC – one of the football clubs playing in the Ghanaian women league. She was called into the team in 2019. In the season overview, she appeared 6 times on the field of play, made 13 saves, kept 4 clean sheets and played 548 minutes for her club.

In 2022, Banwaa was also called into the under-20 National women team to represent Ghana in the FIFA Under-20 Women's World Cup tournament.

In September 2023, Banwaa was announced as Best Goalkeeper of the Season during the Ghana Football Association awards night. She also emerged as a winner in the RG World goalkeeper's competition in 2023 in the month of October/November.
