= Young Buffaloes F.C. (women) =

Swazi women's football team

Young Buffaloes Ladies
- Full name: Young Buffaloes Women's Football Club
- Nicknames: Amathole Ezinyathi; Buffs Ladies
- Ground: Mavuso Sports Centre
- Capacity: 5000
- Coordinates: 26.2927°S 31.2227°E
- Head Coach: (Eswatini) Fisiwe Hlophe
- League: Eswatini Women's League
- 2025/26: 2nd
Home colours	Away colours

Young Buffaloes Ladies F.C. is a Swazi professional women's football club in Mbabane who plays in the Eswatini Women's League, the top tier of Swazi women's football. They are the most successful team in the league with six titles.

In 2024 they became the first side from Eswatini to reach the semifinals of the COSAFA Women's Champions League.

== History ==
=== Eswatini Women's League ===
Young Buffaloes Ladies emerged as a dominant force in Eswatini women’s football during the 2010s and early 2020s. Their most remarkable domestic achievement came in the 2021–22 Eswatini Women’s League, where they won all 24 matches, scoring a league‑record 221 goals and conceding zero goals throughout the season.

Their sustained dominance has made them the most decorated club in the league, with six national championships, establishing a long‑term competitive standard for women’s football in the country.

In the 2021-22 Eswatini Women's League season they won all 24 matches scoring a league record 221 goals and conceding no goals.

=== Continental Competition: CAF Women’s Champions League COSAFA qualifiers ===
Young Buffaloes Ladies were the first Eswatini club to participate in the four consecutive CAF Women’s Champions League COSAFA Qualifiers, making appearances in 2022, 2023, 2024, and 2025.

Young Buffaloes Ladies made their continental debut at the 2022 CAF Women’s Champions League COSAFA Qualifiers, opening their campaign with a 4–0 defeat to Green Buffaloes of Zambia. They concluded the group stage with a 1–0 loss to Olympic de Moroni from Comoros, finishing without a point in their first appearance.

The club returned for the 2023 COSAFA Qualifiers, beginning with a 2–1 loss to CD Costa do Sol of Mozambique. Their second match ended in a 4–0 defeat to Mamelodi Sundowns Ladies of South Africa. Young Buffaloes earned their first point in continental competition after a 3–3 draw with Olympic de Moroni in their final Group B fixture.

=== 2024 Breakthrough: First Knockout Qualification ===
Young Buffaloes opened the 2024 COSAFA Qualifiers with a 2–1 loss to Ascent Academy of Malawi. They drew 1–1 with Gaborone United of Botswana in their second match and secured a decisive 4–0 victory over UD Lichinga of Mozambique in their final Group B game. The result placed them second in the group, qualifying for the knockout stages for the first time. This achievement made them the first Eswatini club to reach the COSAFA Women’s Champions League semifinals. They lost the semifinal 6–0 against the University of the Western Cape.

The club made their fourth consecutive appearance at the 2025 COSAFA Qualifiers, opening with a 1–0 loss to Gaborone United. They closed their group campaign with a 3–1 win over Kick4Life of Lesotho but the result was not enough for them to advance out the group.

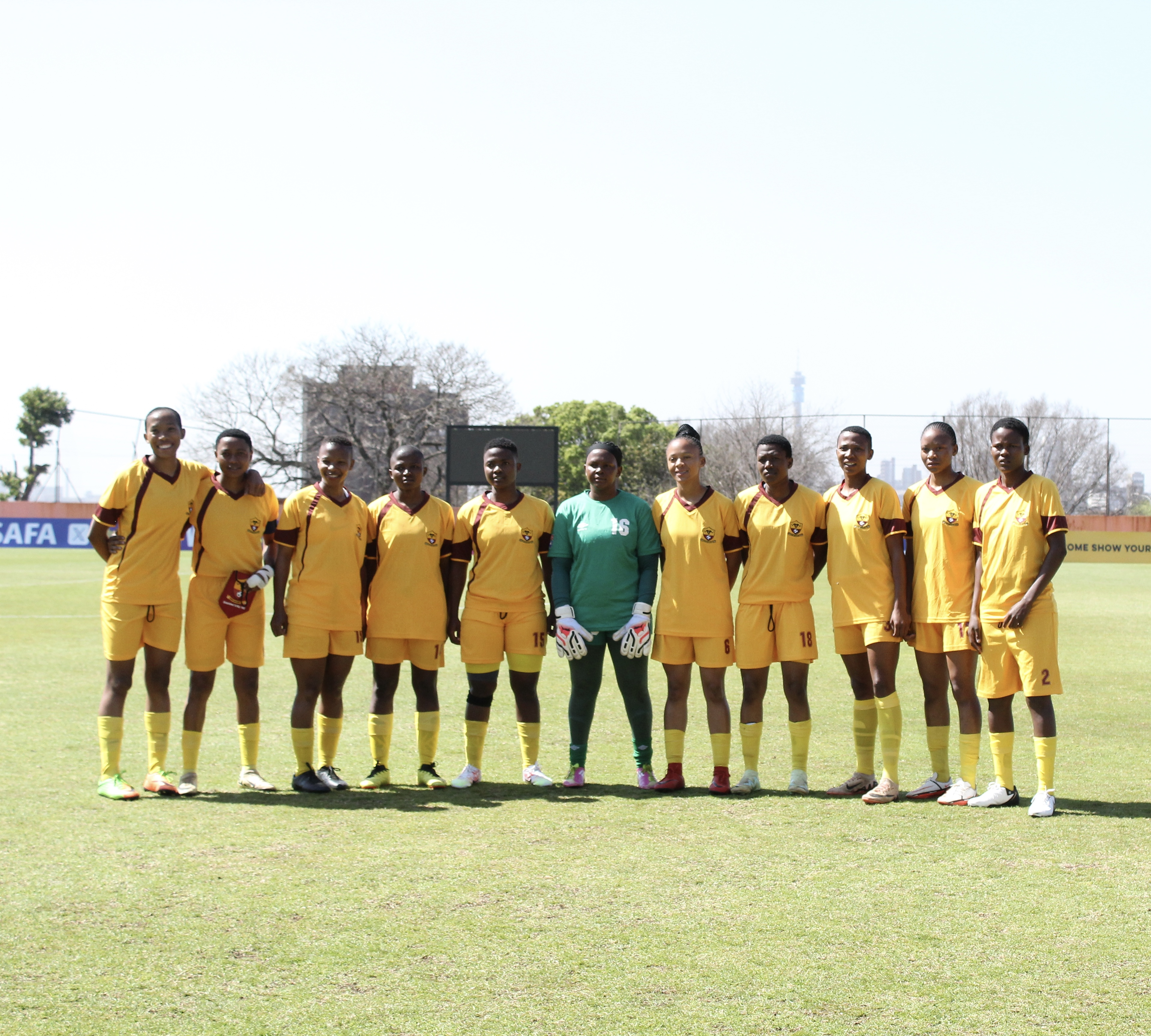
The Young Buffaloes XI at the 2025 CAF Women's Champions League COSAFA Qualifiers against Gaborone United Ladies

== Players ==
As of August 2025

Young Buffaloes Ladies F.C. squad for 2025 season.

Note: Flags indicate national team as defined under FIFA eligibility rules; some limited exceptions apply. Players may hold more than one non-FIFA nationality.

No.	Pos.	Nation	Player
1	GK	SWZ	Gcinile Nondumiso Dlamini
3	DF	SWZ	Tenanile Ngcamphalala
4	DF	SWZ	Futhi Kwanle Dlamini
5	MF	SWZ	Nonjabuliso Lesgo Mokgale
6	MF	SWZ	Nomvuyo Precious Dvuba
7	MF	SWZ	Simile Titi Marks
8	FW	SWZ	Celiwe Nkambule
9	FW	SWZ	Noxolo Portia Malinga
10	FW	SWZ	Sisanda Tengetile Ndzinisa
11	FW	SWZ	Siphiliswe Mpho Ndlovu

No.	Pos.	Nation	Player
12	DF	SWZ	Thandeka Philiswa Mbatha
13	DF	SWZ	Samkeliswe Pretty Malinga
15	MF	SWZ	Welile Contance Ndwandwe
16	FW	SWZ	Nokwanda Glory Mamba
17	MF	SWZ	Simangele Nobuhle Skhondze
18	DF	SWZ	Badelise Ncobile Ngozo
19	FW	SWZ	Sikhanyiso Patience Magagula
20	DF	SWZ	Temalangeni Setsabile Dlamini

== Honours ==
Type	Competition	Titles	Winning Seasons	Runners-up
Domestic	Eswatini Women's League	6	2014/15, 2015/16, 2018/119, 2021/22, 2022/23, 2023/24, 2024/25	2025/26

== Team Statistics ==
=== CAF Women's Champions League COSAFA qualifiers record ===
Season	Pos	Record						
Season	Pos	P	W	D	L	F	A	GD
2022	Group Stage	2	0	0	2	0	5	(5)
2023	Group Stage	3	0	1	2	4	9	(5)
2024	Semifinalist	4	1	1	2	6	9	(3)
2025	Group Stage	2	1	0	1	3	2	1

- Biggest win: 4–0 vs UD Lichinga (2024)
- Heaviest defeat: 0–6 vs UWC Ladies (2024)
- Highest scoring match: 3–3 vs Olympique de Moroni (2023); 0–6 vs UWC Ladies (2024)

== See also ==
- Eswatini Women's League
- CAF Women's Champions League
- COSAFA Women's Champions League
