= 2023 CAF Women's Champions League COSAFA Qualifiers =

3rd COSAFA women's club competition

COSAFA Women's Champions League; Hollywoodbets COSAFA Women's Champions League (sponsored name)

Tournament details
- Host country: South Africa
- City: Durban
- Dates: 30 August – 8 September
- Teams: 8 (from 14 associations)
- Venue: 1 (in 1 host city)

Final positions
- Champions: (South Africa) Mamelodi Sundowns Ladies (2nd title)
- Runners-up: (Botswana) Double Action Ladies
- Third place: (Mozambique) CD Costa do Sol
- Fourth place: (Zambia) Green Buffaloes

Tournament statistics
- Matches played: 16
- Goals scored: 52 (3.25 per match)
- Top scorer: (South Africa) Andisiwe Mgcoyi (3 goals)
- Best player: (Botswana) Lesego Radiakanyo
- Best goalkeeper: (South Africa) Andile Dlamini
- Fair play award: (Botswana) Double Action Ladies

The 2023 CAF Women's Champions League COSAFA Qualifiers, commonly known as the 2023 COSAFA Women's Champions League, was the 3rd edition of the annual women's association football club championship organized by COSAFA for its nations. It was sponsored by South African sports betting company Hollywoodbets and took place in Durban, South Africa for the third straight year from 30 August to 8 September.

== Participating teams ==
The following 8 teams took part in this edition of the tournament:

Team	Appearances	Previous best performance
(Botswana) Double Action Ladies	3rd	Semi-finals (2021, 2022)
(Eswatini) Young Buffaloes	2nd	Group stage (2022)
(Mozambique) CD Costa do Sol	2nd	Group stage (2022)
(South Africa) Mamelodi Sundowns	3rd	Champions (2021)
(Zambia) Green Buffaloes	3rd	Champions (2022)
(Comoros) Olympique de Moroni	2nd	Semi-finals (2022)
Lesotho Defence Force Ladies	2nd	Groupe Stage (2021)
(Malawi) Ntopwa	1st	Debut

== Venues ==
This edition of the tournament was held entirely at the Sugar Ray Xulu Stadium and the Princess Magogo Stadium (for the last day) in Durban, South Africa.

2023 CAF Women's Champions League COSAFA Qualifiers is located in South Africa	Durban	
2023 CAF Women's Champions League COSAFA Qualifiers is located in South Africa	Sugar Ray Xulu Stadium	Princess Magogo Stadium
2023 CAF Women's Champions League COSAFA Qualifiers is located in South Africa	Capacity: 6,500	Capacity: 12,000

== Draw ==
The draw for this edition of the tournament was held on 10 August 2023 at 11:00 UTC (13:00 CAT) in Morocco. The eight teams were drawn into 2 group of 4 teams with teams finishing first and second in the groups qualifying for the knockout stages.

Group A	Group B
(Zambia) Green Buffaloes; (Botswana) Double Action Ladies; Lesotho Defence Force Ladies; (Malawi) Ntopwa	(South Africa) Mamelodi Sundowns; (Mozambique) CD Costa do Sol; (Eswatini) Young Buffaloes; (Comoros) Olympique de Moroni

== Group stage ==
Key to colours in group tables
Group winners and runners-up advance to the Knockout stage

Tiebreakers

Teams were ranked according to points (3 points for a win, 1 point for a draw, 0 points for a loss), and if tied on points, the following tiebreaking criteria are applied, in the order given, to determine the rankings.

1. Points in head-to-head matches among tied teams;
2. Goal difference in head-to-head matches among tied teams;
3. Goals scored in head-to-head matches among tied teams;
4. If more than two teams are tied, and after applying all head-to-head criteria above, a subset of teams are still tied, all head-to-head criteria above are reapplied exclusively to this subset of teams;
5. Goal difference in all group matches;
6. Goals scored in all group matches;
7. Penalty shoot-out if only two teams are tied meet in the last group stage round;
8. Disciplinary points (yellow card = 1 point, red card as a result of two yellow cards = 3 points, direct red card = 3 points, yellow card followed by direct red card = 4 points);
9. Drawing of lots.

All times are South African Standard Time (UTC+2).

=== Group A ===
Pos	Team	Pld	W	D	L	GF	GA	GD	Pts	Qualification
1	(Botswana) Double Action Ladies	3	2	1	0	6	1	+5	7	Semi-finals
2	(Zambia) Green Buffaloes	3	2	1	0	4	2	+2	7	Semi-finals
3	Lesotho Defence Force Ladies	3	0	1	2	2	4	−2	1	
4	(Malawi) Ntopwa	3	0	1	2	1	6	−5	1	

Source: Group standings section in-page
30 August 2023
12:00

Lesotho Defence Force Ladies	1–1	(Malawi) Ntopwa
M. Mohlolo 86'	Report	V. Chikupila 45'

Sugar Ray Xulu Stadium, Durban
30 August 2023
15:30

Green Buffaloes (Zambia)	1–1	(Botswana) Double Action Ladies
Mapepa 50'	Report	Radiakanyo 1'

Sugar Ray Xulu Stadium, Durban
Referee: Maria Rivet (Mauritius)

1 September 2023
12:00

Lesotho Defence Force Ladies	0–1	(Botswana) Double Action Ladies
	Report	L. Senwelo 58'

Sugar Ray Xulu Stadium, Durban
1 September 2023
15:30

Green Buffaloes (Zambia)	1–0	(Malawi) Ntopwa
M. Chilenga 26'	Report

Sugar Ray Xulu Stadium, Durban

4 September 2023
12:00

Lesotho Defence Force Ladies	1–2	(Zambia) Green Buffaloes
M. Nthala 42' (o.g.)	Report	N. Khakanyo 8' (o.g.); Banda 81'

Sugar Ray Xulu Stadium, Durban
4 September 2023
12:00

Ntopwa (Malawi)	0–4	(Botswana) Double Action Ladies
	Report	Radiakanyo 7', 84'; O. Bonang 38'; G. Ontlametse 49' (pen.)

Princess Magogo Stadium, Durban

=== Group B ===
Pos	Team	Pld	W	D	L	GF	GA	GD	Pts	Qualification
1	(South Africa) Mamelodi Sundowns	3	3	0	0	16	0	+16	9	Semi-finals
2	(Mozambique) CD Costa do Sol	3	2	0	1	4	6	−2	6	Semi-finals
3	(Eswatini) Young Buffaloes	3	0	1	2	4	9	−5	1	
4	(Comoros) Olympic de Moroni	3	0	1	2	4	13	−9	1	

Source: Group standings section in-page
31 August 2023
12:00

CD Costa do Sol (Mozambique)	2–1	(Eswatini) Young Buffaloes
M. Janeiro 6'; Goia 18' (pen.)	Report	T. Ngcamphalala 42'

Sugar Ray Xulu Stadium, Durban
31 August 2023
15:30

Mamelodi Sundowns (South Africa)	8–0	(Comoros) Olympic de Moroni
Morifi 10'; Makhubela 37', 58'; Rabale 50'; Mthandi 56'; Tholakele 62'; G. Kekana 84'; Minnies 90+4'	Report

Sugar Ray Xulu Stadium, Durban

2 September 2023
12:00

CD Costa do Sol (Mozambique)	2–1	(Comoros) Olympic de Moroni
Goia 14'; N. Maconho 75'	Report	J. Rima 57'

Sugar Ray Xulu Stadium, Durban
2 September 2023
15:30

Mamelodi Sundowns (South Africa)	4–0	(Eswatini) Young Buffaloes
Daweti 10', 61', 90'; Mgcoyi 73'	Report

Sugar Ray Xulu Stadium, Durban

4 September 2023
15:30

Olympic de Moroni (Comoros)	3–3	(Eswatini) Young Buffaloes
J. Rima 13'; M. Rasoanandrasana 54'; A. Razanampiavy 83'	Report	N. Dlamini 11'; Tenanile Ngcamphalala 60'; M. Dube 88'

Sugar Ray Xulu Stadium, Durban
4 September 2023
15:30

Mamelodi Sundowns (South Africa)	4–0	(Mozambique) CD Costa do Sol
Nhlapho 17' (pen.); Minnies 60'; Mgcoyi 72', 77'	Report

Princess Magogo Stadium, Durban

== Knockout stage ==
- In the knockout stage, extra-time and a penalty shoot-out will be used to decide the winner if necessary.

=== Bracket ===
Semi-finals
6 September – Durban
(Botswana) Double Action Ladies	2
(Mozambique) CD Costa do Sol	0
6 September – Durban
(South Africa) Mamelodi Sundowns	3
(Zambia) Green Buffaloes	1

Final
8 September – Durban
(Botswana) Double Action Ladies	0
(South Africa) Mamelodi Sundowns	2
Third Place match
8 September – Durban
(Zambia) Green Buffaloes	1
(Mozambique) CD Costa do Sol	2

=== Semi-finals ===
6 September 2023
12:00

Double Action Ladies (Botswana)	2–0	(Mozambique) CD Costa do Sol
G. Ontlametse 8', 90'	Report

Sugar Ray Xulu Stadium, Durban
6 September 2023
15:30

Mamelodi Sundowns (South Africa)	3–1	(Zambia) Green Buffaloes
Nhlapho 32'; Morifi 60'; Makhubela 81' (.pen)	Report	Mulenga 11'

Sugar Ray Xulu Stadium, Durban

=== Third place ===
8 September 2023
12:00

Green Buffaloes (Zambia)	1–2	(Mozambique) CD Costa do Sol
S. Phiri 87'	Report	N. Maconho 44'; E. Cazembe 64'

Sugar Ray Xulu Stadium, Durban

=== Final ===
The winner would qualify for the 2023 CAF Women's Champions League as COSAFA representatives.

8 September 2023
15:00

Mamelodi Sundowns (South Africa)	2–0	(Botswana) Double Action Ladies
Morifi 5'; Mthandi 53'	Report

Sugar Ray Xulu Stadium, Durban

== Statistics ==
=== Goalscorers ===
There have been 41 goals scored in 12 matches, for an average of 3.42 goals per match (as of 4 september 2023).

Rank	Player	Team	Goals
1	(South Africa) Andisiwe Mgcoyi	(South Africa) Mamelodi Sundowns	3
1	(South Africa) Chuene Morifi	(South Africa) Mamelodi Sundowns	3
1	(South Africa) Lelona Daweti	(South Africa) Mamelodi Sundowns	3
2	(Mozambique) Goia	(Mozambique) CD Costa do Sol	2
2	(Madagascar) Joeline Rima	(Comoros) Olympic de Moroni	2
2	(Botswana) Leungo Senwelo	(Botswana) Double Action Ladies	2
2	(South Africa) Tiisetso Makhubela	(South Africa) Mamelodi Sundowns	2
2	(South Africa) Miche Minnes	(South Africa) Mamelodi Sundowns	2
2	(South Africa) Nonhlanhla Mthandi	(South Africa) Mamelodi Sundowns	2
4	(Malawi) Vanessa Chikupila	(Malawi) Ntopwa FC	1
4	(Zambia) Siomala Mapepa	(Zambia) Green Buffaloes	1
4	(Zambia) Maweta Chilenga	(Zambia) Green Buffaloes	1
4	(Zambia) Esther Banda	(Zambia) Green Buffaloes	1
4	(Botswana) Oteng Bonang	(Botswana) Double Action Ladies	1
4	(Botswana) Leungo Senwelo	(Botswana) Double Action Ladies	1
4	(Botswana) Gaonyadiwe Ontlametse	(Botswana) Double Action Ladies	1
4	(Lesotho) Maseriti Mohlolo	Lesotho Defence Force Ladies	1
4	(Eswatini) Tenanile Ngcamphalala	(Eswatini) Young Buffaloes	1
4	(Eswatini) Nothando Dlamini	(Eswatini) Young Buffaloes	1
4	(Eswatini) Tenanile Ngcamphalala	(Eswatini) Young Buffaloes	1
4	(Eswatini) Mazwi Dube	(Eswatini) Young Buffaloes	1
4	(Mozambique) Marlene Janeiro	(Mozambique) CD Costa do Sol	1
4	(Mozambique) Neide Maconho	(Mozambique) CD Costa do Sol	1
4	(Lesotho) Boitumelo Rabale	(South Africa) Mamelodi Sundowns	1
4	(Botswana) Refilwe Tholakele	(South Africa) Mamelodi Sundowns	1
4	(South Africa) Gabonnelwe Kekana	(South Africa) Mamelodi Sundowns	1
4	(South Africa) Zanele Nhlapo	(South Africa) Mamelodi Sundowns	1
4	(Madagascar) Marie Rasoanandrasana	(Comoros) Olympique de Moroni	1
4	(Madagascar) Aimée Razanampiavy	(Comoros) Olympique de Moroni	1

=== Own goals ===
Rank	Player	Team	Goals
1	(Zambia) Memory Nthala	(Zambia) Green Buffaloes	1
1	(Lesotho) Ntsatsi Khakanyo	Lesotho Defence Force Ladies	1
