= 2022 CAF Women's Champions League COSAFA Qualifiers =

2nd COSAFA Women's Champions League edition

COSAFA Women's Champions League; Hollywoodbets COSAFA Women's Champions League (sponsored name)

Tournament details
- Host country: South Africa
- City: Durban
- Dates: 7 – 13 August 2022
- Teams: 6 (from 14 associations)
- Venue(s): 1 (in 1 host city)

Final positions
- Champions: (Zambia) Green Buffaloes (1st title)
- Runners-up: (South Africa) Mamelodi Sundowns
- Third place: (Botswana) Double Action Ladies
- Fourth place: (Comoros) Olympic de Moroni

Tournament statistics
- Matches played: 8
- Goals scored: 25 (3.13 per match)
- Top scorer(s): (Zambia) Ireen Lungu (5 goals)
- Best player(s): (South Africa) Melinda Kgadiete
- Best goalkeeper: (Zambia) Aisha Mbwana
- Fair play award: (Botswana) Double Action Ladies

The 2022 CAF Women's Champions League COSAFA Qualifiers, commonly known as the 2022 COSAFA Women's Champions League and for sponsorship purposes as the 2022 Hollywoodbets COSAFA Women's Champions League, was the 2nd edition of the annual qualification tournament for the CAF Women's Champions League organized by COSAFA for its nations. It took place in Durban, South Africa in consecutive years after having hosted the inaugural edition the previous year from 7 to 13 August 2022, having been originally scheduled from 4 to 14 August and is the first to be sponsored by South African sports betting company, Hollywoodbets.

Mamelodi Sundowns Ladies were the defending champions but got defeated and succeeded by Green Buffaloes 6–5 on penalties following a goalless draw after extra time.

== Teams ==
The following teams took part in this edition of the tournament:

Team	Appearances	Previous best performance
(Botswana) Double Action Ladies	2nd	Semi-finals (2021)
(Eswatini) Young Buffaloes	1st	Debut
(Mozambique) CD Costa do Sol	1st	Debut
(South Africa) Mamelodi Sundowns Ladies	2nd	Champions (2021)
(Zambia) Green Buffaloes	2nd	Semi-finals (2021)
(Comoros) Olympique de Moroni	1st	Debut

== Venue ==
This edition of the tournament was held entirely at the Sugar Ray Xulu Stadium in Durban, South Africa.

Durban	Durban is located in South Africa
Sugar Ray Xulu Stadium	Durban is located in South Africa
Capacity: 6,500	Durban is located in South Africa

== Draw ==
The draw for this edition of the tournament was held on 20 July 2022 at 11:00 UTC (13:00 CAT) in Morocco. The six teams were drawn into 2 group of 3 teams with teams finishing first and second in the groups qualifying for the knockout stages. The resultant groups are as follows:

Group A	Group B
(South Africa) Mamelodi Sundowns; (Mozambique) CD Costa do Sol; (Botswana) Double Action Ladies	(Zambia) Green Buffaloes; (Eswatini) Young Buffaloes; (Comoros) Olympique de Moroni

== Group stage ==
Key to colours in group tables
Group winners and runners-up advance to the Knockout stage

Tiebreakers

Teams were ranked according to the three points for a win system (3 for a win, 1 for a draw and none for a loss) and if tied on points, the following tie-breaking criteria are applied, in the order given, to determine the rankings.

1. Points in head-to-head matches among tied teams;
2. Goal difference in head-to-head matches among tied teams;
3. Goals scored in head-to-head matches among tied teams;
4. If more than two teams are tied, and after applying all head-to-head criteria above, a subset of teams are still tied, all head-to-head criteria above are reapplied exclusively to this subset of teams;
5. Goal difference in all group matches;
6. Goals scored in all group matches;
7. Penalty shoot-out if only two teams are tied meet in the last group stage round;
8. Disciplinary points (yellow card = 1 point, red card as a result of two yellow cards = 3 points, direct red card = 3 points, yellow card followed by direct red card = 4 points);
9. Drawing of lots.

All times are in South African Standard Time (UTC+2).

=== Group A ===
Pos	Team	Pld	W	D	L	GF	GA	GD	Pts	Qualification
1	(South Africa) Mamelodi Sundowns	2	1	1	0	9	2	+7	4	Final
2	(Botswana) Double Action Ladies	2	1	1	0	3	1	+2	4	Third place
3	(Mozambique) CD Costa do Sol	2	0	0	2	1	10	−9	0	

7 August 2022
12:00

Mamelodi Sundowns (South Africa)	8–1	(Mozambique) CD Costa do Sol
Kgadiete 2', 45'; Mgcoyi 30', 33'; Z. Nhlapho 38' (pen.); M. Minnies 54'; N. Farranguana 61' (o.g.); Mulaudzi 69'	Report	Ninika 77' (pen.)

Sugar Ray Xulu Stadium, Durban, South Africa
9 August 2022
12:00

Double Action Ladies (Botswana)	1–1	(South Africa) Mamelodi Sundowns
Makhubela 19' (o.g.)	Report	Kgadiete 25'

Sugar Ray Xulu Stadium, Durban, South Africa
11 August 2022
12:00

Double Action Ladies (Botswana)	2–0	(Mozambique) CD Costa do Sol
O. Bonang 14'; G. Ontlametse 84'	Report

Sugar Ray Xulu Stadium, Durban, South Africa

=== Group B ===
Pos	Team	Pld	W	D	L	GF	GA	GD	Pts	Qualification
1	(Zambia) Green Buffaloes	2	2	0	0	8	0	+8	6	Final
2	(Comoros) Olympic de Moroni	2	1	0	1	1	4	−3	3	Third place
3	(Eswatini) Young Buffaloes	2	0	0	2	0	5	−5	0	

7 August 2022
15:30

Young Buffaloes (Eswatini)	0–4	(Zambia) Green Buffaloes
	Report	Lungu 32', 84'; Chanda 42'; Mulenga 67'

Sugar Ray Xulu Stadium, Durban, South Africa
9 August 2022
15:30

Green Buffaloes (Zambia)	4–0	(Comoros) Olympic de Moroni
Lungu 29', 63', 70' (pen.); N. Nanyangwe 59'	Report

Sugar Ray Xulu Stadium, Durban, South Africa
11 August 2022
15:30

Olympic de Moroni (Comoros)	1–0	(Eswatini) Young Buffaloes
H. Anlaouia 44'	Report

Sugar Ray Xulu Stadium, Durban, South Africa

== Knockout stage ==
=== Third place ===
13 August 2022
12:00

Double Actions Ladies (Botswana)	3–0	(Comoros) Olympic de Moroni
O. Rathari 25', 68'; H. Anlaouia 80' (.og)	Report

Sugar Ray Xulu Stadium, Durban, South Africa

=== Final ===
The winners would qualify for the 2022 CAF Women's Champions League as COSAFA representatives.

13 August 2022
15:30

Mamelodi Sundowns (South Africa)	0–0 (a.e.t.)	(Zambia) Green Buffaloes
	Report
Penalties
	5-6

Sugar Ray Xulu Stadium, Durban, South Africa

== Statistics ==
=== Goalscorers ===
There have been 25 goals scored in 8 matches, for an average of 3.12 goals per match.

Rank	Player	Team	Goals
1	(Zambia) Ireen Lungu	(Zambia) Green Buffaloes	5
2	(South Africa) Melinda Kgadiete	(South Africa) Mamelodi Sundowns Ladies	3
3	(South Africa) Andisiwe Mgcoyi	(South Africa) Mamelodi Sundowns Ladies	2
3	(Botswana) Obonetse Ratharin	(Botswana) Double Action Ladies	2
5	(Zambia) Anita Mulenga	(Zambia) Green Buffaloes	1
5	(Zambia) Hellen Chanda	(Zambia) Green Buffaloes	1
5	(Zambia) Natasha Nanyangwe	(Zambia) Green Buffaloes	1
5	(South Africa) Zanele Nhlapho	(South Africa) Mamelodi Sundowns Ladies	1
5	(South Africa) Miche Minnies	(South Africa) Mamelodi Sundowns Ladies	1
5	(South Africa) Rhoda Mulaudzi	(South Africa) Mamelodi Sundowns Ladies	1
5	(Mozambique) Ninika	(Mozambique) Costa Do Sol	1
5	(Botswana) Oteng Bonang	(Botswana) Double Action Ladies	1
5	(Botswana) Gaonyadiwe Ontlametse	(Botswana) Double Action Ladies	1
5	(Comoros) Hadhirami Anlaouia	(Comoros) Olympic de Moroni	1

=== Own goals ===
Rank	Player	Team	Goals
1	(Mozambique) Nadia Farranguana	(Mozambique) Costa Do Sol	1
1	(South Africa) Tiisetso Makhubela	(South Africa) Mamelodi Sundowns Ladies	1
1	(Comoros) Hadhirami Anlaouia	(Comoros) Olympic de Moroni	1

== Awards ==
The CAF Women's Champions League COSAFA Qualifiers technical study group selected the following as the best of this edition of the tournament.

Award	Player/Coach	Team
Best Player	(South Africa) Melinda Kgadiete	(South Africa) Mamelodi Sundowns
Best Goalkeeper	(Zambia) Aisha Mbwana	(Zambia) Green Buffaloes
Best Coach		

=== Squad of the tournament ===
The CAF Women's Champions League COSAFA Qualifiers technical study group selected the following 11 players as the squad of the tournament.

==== Best XI ====
Pos.	Player	Team
GK		
DF		
MF		
FW		
