= COSAFA Women's Champions League =

Southern African women's soccer tournament

- COSAFA Women's Champions League logo
- Organiser(s): COSAFA
- Founded: 2021; 5 years ago
- Region: Southern Africa
- Teams: 10
- Current champions: (South Africa) Mamelodi Sundowns Ladies (3rd title)
- Most championships: (South Africa) Mamelodi Sundowns Ladies (3 titles)
- Broadcaster(s): SuperSport SABC Sport COSAFA TV (YouTube)
- Website: Official website
- 2026 edition

The CAF Women's Champions League COSAFA Qualifiers, branded as the COSAFA Women's Champions League, is an annual qualification tournament for the CAF Women's Champions League organized by COSAFA for its nations. Established in 2021, it has been sponsored by South African sports betting company, Hollywoodbets.

== History ==
In 2020, CAF announced the launch of the CAF Women's Champions League with each of the six sub confederations to hold qualifiers with the winners to represent them at the main tournament.

In April 2021, COSAFA announced the launch for the inaugural COSAFA Women's Champions League and confirmed the eight team to participate. Prison XI from Botswana were replaced by Double Action as the former turned down the invitation citing logistical issues.

The inaugural edition was held from 26 August - 4 September 2021 in Durban, South Africa. Mamelodi Sundowns from South Africa defeated Black Rhinos Queens from Zimbabwe 3–0 in the final.

The second edition was held from 7–13 August 2022 in Durban, South Africa. Green Buffaloes from Zambia defeated Mamelodi Sundowns from South Africa 6-5 via penalties after the match ended in goalless draw.

The third edition was held from 30 August - 8 September 2023 in Durban, South Africa. Mamelodi Sundowns from South Africa defeated Double Action Ladies from Botswana 2–0 in the final.

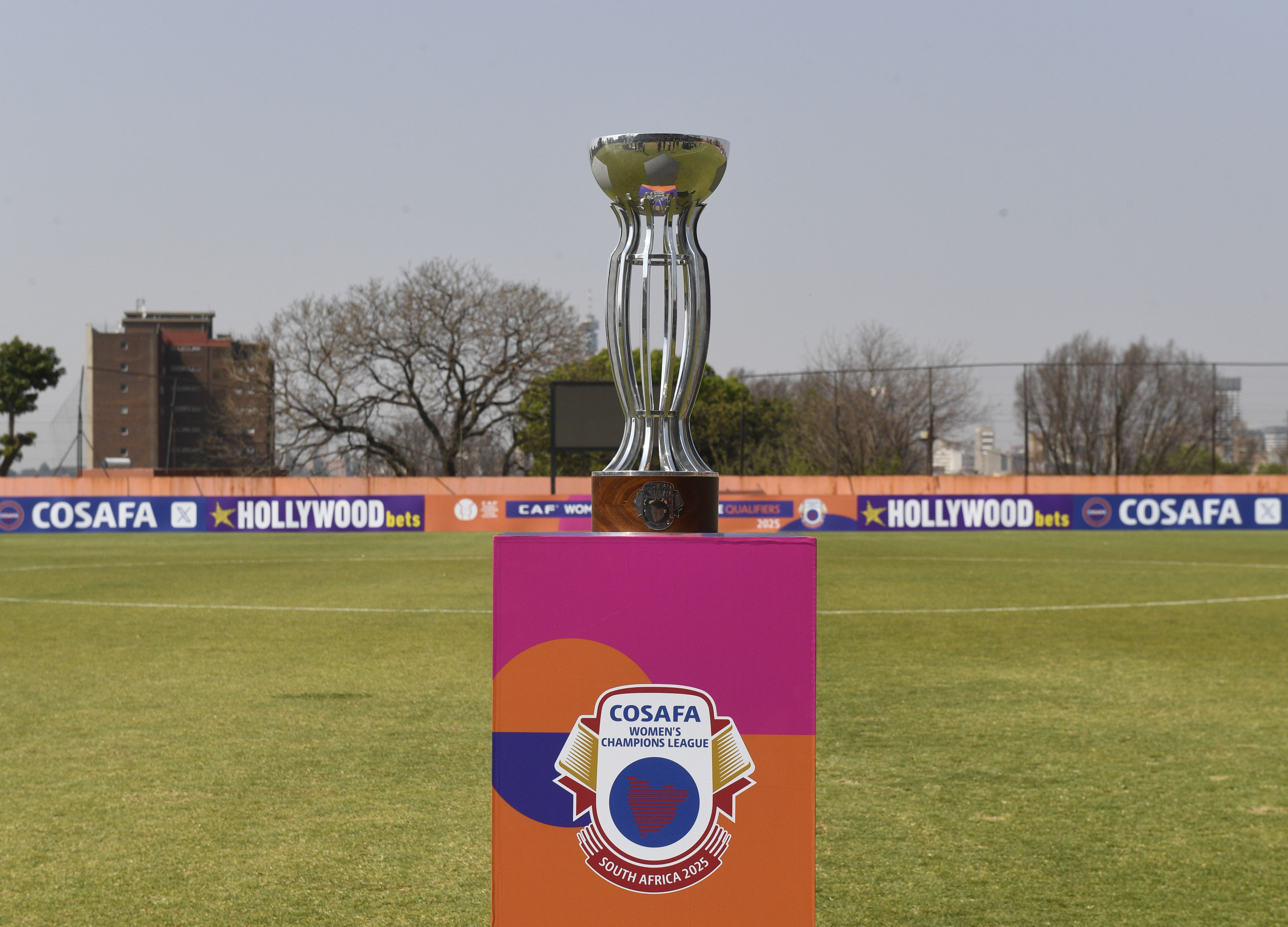
The COSAFA Women's Champions League trophy

The 2024 edition was held from 15–24 August 2024 in Blantyre, Malawi. The University of the Western Cape from South Africa defeated Gaborone United Ladies from Botswana 9-8 via penalties after the match ended in a 1–1 draw.

The 2025 edition was held from 22–31 August 2025 in Johannesburg, South Africa. Gaborone United from Botswana defeated ZESCO Ndola from Zambia 4-3 via penalties after the match ended in a 1–1 draw.

The 2026 edition was held from 20–29 August 2026 in Gaborone, Botswana. Mamelodi Sundowns from South Africa defeated ZESCO Ndola from Zambia 2–1 in the final.

== Results ==
Season	Champion	Score	Runner-up	Refs.
2021	(South Africa) Mamelodi Sundowns	3–0	(Zimbabwe) Black Rhinos Queens	
2022	(Zambia) Green Buffaloes	0–0 (6–5 p)	(South Africa) Mamelodi Sundowns	
2023	(South Africa) Mamelodi Sundowns	2–0	(Botswana) Double Action	
2024	(South Africa) University of the Western Cape	1–1 (9–8 p)	(Botswana) Gaborone United	
2025	(Botswana) Gaborone United	1–1 (4–3 p)	(Zambia) ZESCO Ndola	
2026	(South Africa) Mamelodi Sundowns	2–1	(Zambia) ZESCO Ndola	

== Records and statistics ==
Tournament	Best Player	Golden Boot	Goals	Golden Glove	Fair play	Ref
2021	(Zimbabwe) Rutendo Makore	(South Africa) Melinda Kgadiete	5	(Zimbabwe) Precious Mudyiwa	-	
2022	(South Africa) Melinda Kgadiete	(Zambia) Ireen Lungu	5	(Zambia) Aisha Mbwana	(Botswana) Double Action	
2023	(Botswana) Lesego Radiakanyo	(South Africa) Andisiwe Mgcoyi	3	(South Africa) Andile Dlamini	(Botswana) Double Action	
2024	(Botswana) Keitumetse Dithebe	(South Africa) Bongeka Gamede	3	(South Africa) Siphesihle Dlamini	(South Africa) University of the Western Cape	
2024	(Botswana) Keitumetse Dithebe	(Eswatini) Siphilisiwe Ndlovu	3	(South Africa) Siphesihle Dlamini	(South Africa) University of the Western Cape	
2025	(Zambia) Eneless Phiri	(Botswana) Gaonyadiwe Ontlametse	7	(Botswana) Tlamelo Pheresi	(Zambia) ZESCO Ndola	
2026	(South Africa) Karabo Dhlamini	(Botswana) Refilwe Tholakele	7	(South Africa) Andile Dlamini	(Zambia) ZESCO Ndola	

=== Performance by nation ===
Nation	Winners	Runners-up	3rd Places	4th places	Winner	Runners-up	3rd Place	4th place
South Africa	4	1	0	0	Mamelodi Sundowns (3); University of the Western Cape (1)	Mamelodi Sundowns (1)		
Botswana	1	2	2		Gaborone United (1)	Double Action (1); Gaborone United (1)	Double Action (1); Gaborone United (1)	
Zambia	1	2	0	1	Green Buffaloes (1)	ZESCO Ndola (2)		Green Buffaloes (1)
Zimbabwe	0	1	0	0		Black Rhinos Queens (1)		
Mozambique	0	0	1	0			CD Costa do Sol (1)	
Comoros	0	0	0	1				Olympic de Moroni (1)
Malawi	0	0	0	1				Silver Strikers (1)
