= 2026 SAFA Women's League =

2026 season of the SAFA Women's League

SAFA Women's League
- Season: 2026
- Dates: 23 May 2026 – 8 November 2026
- Teams: 16 split into two streams
- All statistics correct as of 22 October 2026.

The 2026 SAFA Women's League, known as the 2026 Hollywoodbets Super League for sponsorship reasons, is the seventh season of the professional SAFA Women's League, and the 18th season of nation-wide league competition in women's football in South Africa. This is the fifth season contested with 16 teams and the first to be played in a two‑stream format consisting of two groups of eight. The winners of each stream will meet in the final to determine the overall league champion.

== Teams and locations ==
Team	Location	Stadium	Capacity	2024 Season
City Lads	New Brighton	Isaac Wolfson Stadium	10,000	14th
Copperbelts Ladies	Seshego	Seshego Stadium	15000	12th
First Touch F.C.	Polokwane	Baroka Village	1000	6th
Diepkloof Ladies	Diepkloof	TBD		
Ezemvelo	Isipingo	Princess Magogo Stadium	10000	1st in SWL
JVW F.C.	Bedfordview	Wits Stadium	5000	5th
Mamelodi Sundowns Ladies	Pretoria	Lucas Moripe Stadium	28,900	1st
Ramatlaohle Ladies	Mokopane	TBD		
Richmond United	De Aar	Merino Park Stadium	200	10th
Stellenbosch Women	Stellenbosch	Danie Craven Stadium	16000	-
TS Galaxy Queens	Mbombela	Solomon Mahlangu Stadium	5000	3rd
TUT Matsatsantsa	Pretoria	TUT Stadium	2500	11th
UFH Ladies	Alice	Davidson Stadium	200	9th
UJ Ladies	Auckland Park	UJ Stadium	8000	4th
UP-Tuks Ladies	Hatfield	Tuks Stadium	14,150	8th
UWC Ladies	Bellville	UWC Stadium	2500	2nd

Stellenbosch bought the status on the University of Cape Town. Diepkloof Ladies and Ramatlaohle were promoted following the relegation of Durban Ladies and Royal AM.

== Streams ==
The teams were split into the following two streams:

SuperEra	SuperRise
Copperbelts Ladies	City Lads
Diepkloof Ladies	First Touch F.C.
Mamelodi Sundowns Ladies	Ezemvelo
Richmond United	JVW F.C.
Stellenbosch Women	Ramatlaohle Ladies
TS Galaxy Queens	TUT Matsatsantsa
UP-Tuks Ladies	UFH Ladies
UWC Ladies	UJ Ladies

== League table ==
Pos	Team	Pld	W	D	L	GF	GA	GD	Pts	Qualification or relegation
1	Mamelodi Sundowns Ladies	11	10	1	0	25	0	+25	31	COSAFA Champions League
2	JVW	11	6	5	0	21	8	+13	23	
3	University of Fort Hare	11	6	4	1	8	7	+1	22	
4	University of Pretoria	11	6	2	3	12	11	+1	20	
5	University of the Western Cape	11	6	2	3	13	9	+4	20	
6	TS Galaxy Queens	11	6	2	3	13	14	−1	20	
7	University of Johannesburg	11	6	2	3	11	11	0	20	
8	Copperbelt Ladies	11	5	2	4	10	15	−5	17	
9	TUT Matsatsantsa Ladies	11	4	2	5	16	16	0	14	
10	First Touch	11	3	4	4	5	11	−6	13	
11	Ramatlaohle Ladies	11	3	3	5	6	13	−7	12	
12	Ezemvelo	11	3	2	6	6	15	−9	11	
13	Richmond United	11	2	2	7	8	28	−20	8	
14	City Lads	11	2	0	9	3	26	−23	6	
15	Diepkloof Ladies	11	1	2	8	5	19	−14	5	Relegation
16	Stellenbosch Women	11	1	1	9	2	24	−22	4	Relegation

Updated to match(es) played on 2026-10-22. Source: "Match centre". Hollywoodbets Super League.

== Statistics ==
Hat-tricks

Player	For	Against	Result	Date
Siyamthanda Qashani	University of Pretoria	TS Galaxy Queens	0–3 (A)	6 September 2026
Siyamthanda Qashani	University of Pretoria	Stellenbosch Women	4–0 (H)	12 September 2026
Boitumelo Rabale	Mamelodi Sundowns Ladies	Richmond United	0–8 (A)	4 October 2026
