= Women's soccer in South Africa =

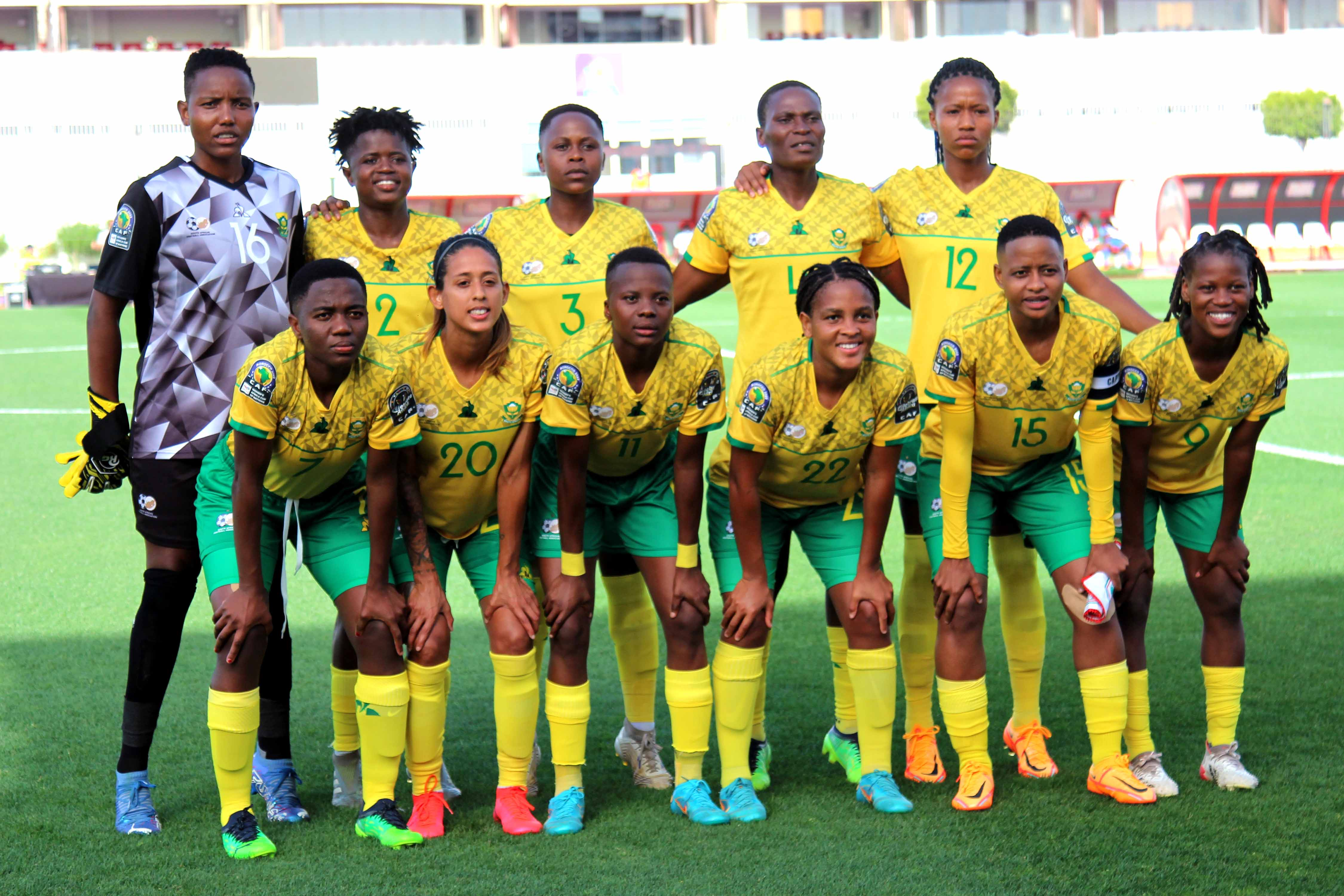
- Banyana Banyana's XI at the 2022 WAFCON
- Country: South Africa
- Governing body: South African Football Association
- National teams: Women's national team Women's U/20 team Women's U/17 team Women's U/15 team
- Nickname: Banyana Banyana (senior national team) Basetsana (U/20) Bantwana (U/17)
- Clubs: 160

National competitions
- Sasol League National Championship

Club competitions
- SAFA Women's League; Sasol Women's League; SAFA Women's Regional League; Women's Varsity Football; Pirates Cup (Women) Gauteng Women's Development League

International competitions
- FIFA Women's World Cup; Olympics; FIFA U-17 Women's World Cup; Women's Africa Cup of Nations; COSAFA Women's Championship; CAF Women's Champions League COSAFA Women's Champions League

Women's soccer began in South Africa during the 1960s and gained popularity in the 1990s, when the first national women's team was formed.

== History ==
South African women's soccer started in 1960 during the Apartheid era. Orlando Pirates Women's Football Club and Mother City Girls were among the first women's soccer clubs formed in 1962.

== National league ==
Sanlam National Women's Football League was set up in the late 1990s with the goal of increasing the number of women in soccer administration and a second season was played in 2002.

In 2009, a semi-professional women's football league the Sasol Women's League was established with the aim of developing the women's game.

In 2012, the Ministry of Sports and Recreation called for the creation of a women's football league after the national women's football team, Banyana Banyana, returned from the 2012 Olympic Games without a single win.

=== 2019-present:SAFA Women's National League ===
In August 2019, the inaugural SAFA Women's National League was launched. The following teams formed part of the 12 team league. They consisted of the nine provincial winners that took part in the 2018 Sasol League National Championship and three teams invited to join the league.

Team	Province
Thunderbirds Ladies	Eastern Cape
Bloemfontein Celtics Ladies	Free State
Tsunami Queens*	Free State
Mamelodi Sundowns Ladies*	Gauteng
TUT Ladies	Gauteng
UJ Ladies*	Gauteng
Durban Ladies	Kwa-Zulu Natal
First Touch	Limpopo
Coal City Wizards	Mpumalanga
Richmond United	Northern Cape
Golden Ladies	North West
UWC Ladies	Western Cape

*invited teams

Mamelodi Sundowns Ladies won the inaugural season undefeated with 21 wins and 1 draw.

Pos	Team	Pld	W	D	L	GF	GA	GD	Pts	Qualification or relegation
1	Mamelodi Sundowns Ladies (C)	22	21	1	0	83	13	+70	64	Champions League
2	TUT Ladies	22	17	4	1	83	26	+57	55	
3	Bloemfontein Celtic Ladies	22	13	5	4	55	25	+30	44	
4	First Touch	22	10	6	6	54	44	+10	36	
5	Coal City Wizards	22	8	8	6	38	38	0	32	
6	UWC Ladies	22	7	9	6	46	27	+19	30	
7	Durban Ladies	22	8	2	12	32	52	−20	26	
8	UJ Ladies	22	8	2	12	35	57	−22	26	
9	Golden Ladies	22	4	5	13	25	45	−20	17	
10	Thunderbirds Ladies	22	4	4	14	29	63	−34	16	
11	Richmond United	22	4	2	16	24	69	−45	14	
12	Tsunami Queens	22	2	4	16	21	66	−45	10	

(C) Champion

A copy of the match results of the inaugural season.

Home \ Away	BCL	CCW	DBN	FT	GDL	MSD	RMU	TBL	TUT	TQ	UJ	UWC
Bloemfontein Celtics Ladies		5–0	2–1	1–3	3–2	0–1	1–1	4–2	0–2	3–0	6–1	0–0
Coal City Wizards	1–1		1–1	2–2	3–2	1–4	3–2	3–0	0–2	2–1	2–0	2–2
Durban Ladies	0–6	2–1		3–2	3–2	0–3	3–1	4–1	1–6	0–1	1–2	0–5
First Touch	2–2	2–2	4–1		4–0	2–3	6–1	4–1	2–4	3–1	2–4	2–1
Golden Ladies	0–2	0–0	0–1	1–1		1–4	4–2	4–1	1–8	2–0	0–1	1–4
Mamelodi Sundowns Ladies	3–0	4–1	3–1	11–1	3–1		7–0	6–0	2–1	8–0	3–2	3–0
Richmond United	2–5	0–1	2–3	1–5	0–1	0–1		3–2	0–8	1–1	0–3	1–8
Thunderbirds Ladies	0–4	4–3	1–1	0–2	1–1	0–6	2–3		1–2	3–1	2–3	0–0
TUT Ladies	1–1	2–2	3–2	3–1	2–1	1–1	2–0	5–2		7–2	3–2	2–2
Tsunami Queens	0–3	0–5	1–0	0–2	0–0	1–2	1–2	3–4	1–6		3–3	0–5
UJ Ladies	3–4	1–2	3–4	1–1	1–0	0–3	2–1	0–1	0–10	2–1		0–2
UWC Ladies	0–2	1–1	2–0	1–1	1–1	0–2	0–1	1–1	2–3	3–3	6–1	

Updated to match(es) played on unknown. Source:
Legend: Blue = home team win; Yellow = draw; Red = away team win.

=== Pyramid system ===
When the SAFA Women's League started in 2019 as the level 1 division, it displaced the Sasol Women's League to level 2 and the SAFA Women's Regional League to level 3. The Sasol Women's League still serves as a provincial league with the nine provincial SAFA's overseeing their respective league. The SAFA Women's Regional League serves as the third division and is overseen by the Local Football Associations (LFAs).They are currently 52 regions across South Africa's nine provinces. Each LFA champion then competes in a single-location provincial SAFA Regional Championship to crown the team that will be promoted to the provincial league.

Level	League
1	SAFA Women's League (16 teams)
2	Sasol Women's League (144 teams)
3	SAFA Women's Regional League

== Youth Leagues ==
SAFA announced its provincial members would be setting up girls youth leagues around the country in order to improve girls soccer in the country as the youth national teams were struggling. By 2024, Basetsana had not qualified for the FIFA U-20 Women's World Cup and Bantwana had last qualified in 2018. The U/15 Girls Inter-LFA League was launched in 2023 in the Limpopo province. In the Gauteng province, the Gauteng Women's Development League was launched with the inaugural season being an U/15 league only. In 2024, the league had switched to two divisions for U/16 and U/14 girls.

The launch of the girls youth leagues also coincided the launch of a new national team. The South Africa women's national U/15 team. In 2022 and 2023 the team won the COSAFA Schools Cup. In 2024 they won their maiden CAF African Schools Football Championship.

In September 2024, SAFA held the inaugural U15 Talent Development Scheme (TDS) Girls interprovincial championship with all nine provinces selecting a team to represent them. Gauteng won the first edition after defeating the Western Cape 2–1 in the final held at Panorama Football Club, in Roodepoort. The aim of this tournament is to identify players to be monitored by national scouts for the U/15 team and eventually the U/17 team.

== National teams ==
South Africa women's national football team, nicknamed "Banyana Banyana" has been participating in international soccer since 1993, when they beat Eswatini (formerly Swaziland) 14–0 on 30 May of that year. This is their biggest win to date.

South Africa women's national under-20 team, is nicknamed "Basetsana".

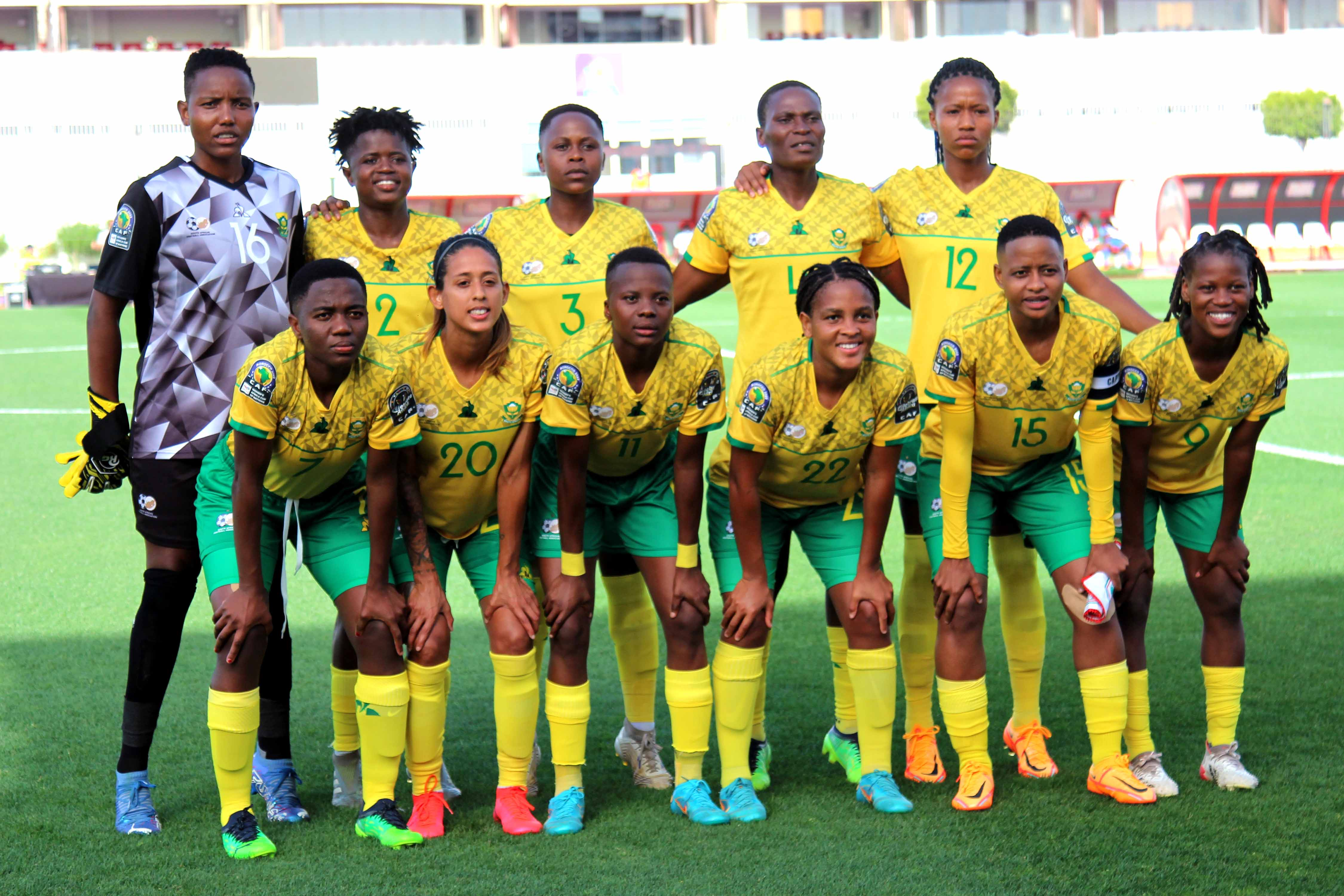
Banyana Banyana starting XI at the 2022 Women's Africa Cup of Nations in Morocco.

South Africa women's national under-17 soccer team, nicknamed "Bantwana".

The teams are controlled by the South African Football Association.

== International participation ==
They have been competing in the CAF Women's Championship since 1995. They qualified for the Olympic Games for the first time at the 2012 Olympic Games. Banyana Banyana won their first Women's Africa Cup of Nations, when they defeated hosts Morocco 2–1 in the 2022 final.

Banyana Banyana made their FIFA Women's World Cup debut in 2019. At the 2023 edition, they became the first South African team to qualify for the knockout stages at a world cup by reaching the round of 16.

Bantwana made their FIFA U-17 Women's World Cup debut in 2010. Bantwana made their second appearance at the 2018 FIFA U-17 Women's World Cup. They have not made it past the group stages on the tournament.

Bantwana hold the African record for most goals in an international match. They scored 28 goals (won 28–0) against Seychelles in the opening match of group B at the 2019 COSAFA U-17 Women's Championship.

== See also ==
- Football in South Africa
- SAFA Women's League
- Sasol Women's League
- SAFA Women's Regional League
- Gauteng Women's Development League
