= Asa Rabalao =

South African association football player and youth coach

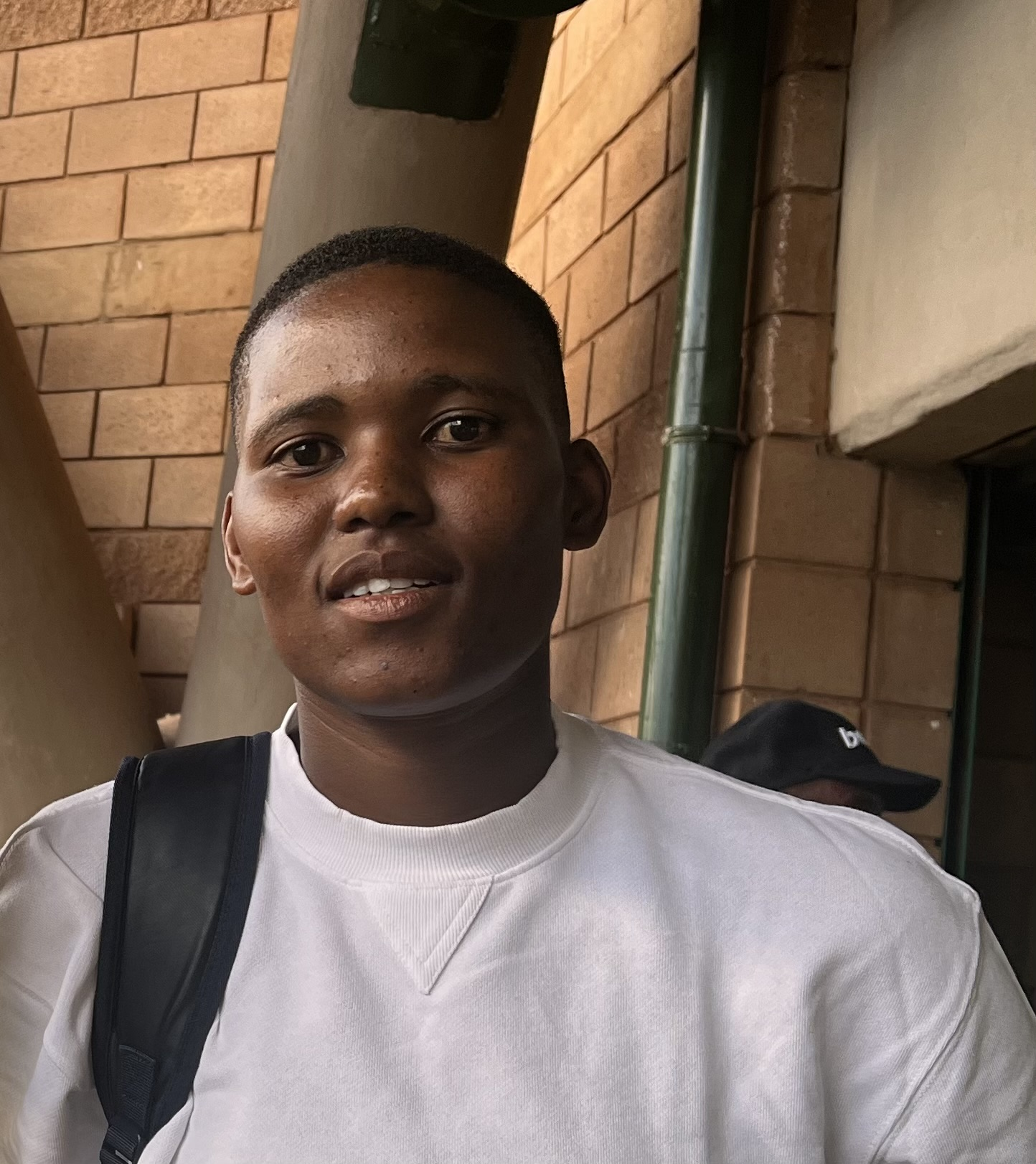
- Rabalao in 2024

Personal information
- Full name: Phillistus Asa Rabalao
- Date of birth: 17 December 1996 (age 29)
- Position: Goalkeeper

Team information
- Current team: Mamelodi Sundowns Ladies Academy (youth coach)

College career
Years	Team	Apps	(Gls)
2015–2020	North West University		

Senior career*
Years	Team	Apps	(Gls)
2021–2022	Mamelodi Sundowns Ladies		
2023	University of Pretoria		
2024–2025	Mamelodi Sundowns Ladies		

Managerial career
- 2025–: Mamelodi Sundowns Ladies Academy (youth coach)
- * Club domestic league appearances and goals

Phillistus Asa Rabalao (born 17 December 1996) is a South African former soccer player who played as a goalkeeper. She is currently a youth coach for Mamelodi Sundowns Ladies Academy.

Rabalao was named in the 2021 CAF Women's Champions League Group Stage Best XI.

== College career ==
Rabalao played for the North West University as a student-athlete.

== Club career ==
=== Mamelodi Sundowns Ladies ===
Rabalao played the first two matches at the 2021 CAF Women's Champions League for Sundowns Ladies keeping two clean sheets against Vihiga Queens and Rivers Angels. She was named in the 2021 CAF Women's Champions League Group Stage Best XI. Andile Dlamini played the rest of the matches at the tournament. The side won the inaugural CAF Women's Champions League without conceding a single goal.

=== University of Pretoria ===
In March 2023, she was unveiled as one of three new players from Sundowns Ladies for Tuks Ladies for the 2023 season.

=== Mamelodi Sundowns Ladies ===
She returned to Sundowns for the 2024 season but stayed on the sidelines nursing an injury.

== Coaching career ==
Rabalao was officially unveiled as the Mamelodi Sundowns Ladies Academy youth coach in July 2025.

== Honours ==
- CAF Women's Champions League: 2021 runners-up: 2022
- SAFA Women's League: 2021, 2022, 2024

Individual

- 2021 CAF Women's Champions League Group Stage Best XI
