= Philisa Mjambane =

South African soccer player

Personal information
- Date of birth: 7 September 1996 (age 30)
- Place of birth: Mount Frere
- Position: Forward

Team information
- Current team: University of the Western Cape
- Number: 18

Senior career*
Years	Team	Apps	(Gls)
-2021	Thunderbirds Ladies		
2022-	University of the Western Cape		
- * Club domestic league appearances and goals

Philisa Mjambane (born 7 September 1996) is a South African soccer player who plays as a forward for SAFA Women's League side the University of the Western Cape.

== Club career ==
=== Thunderbirds Ladies ===
She scored a brace in the opening match against Golden Ladies at the 2018 Sasol League National Championship held in Kimberly. She helped her side move out to relegation in the 2021 season when she scored the winner in a 1–0 win over the University of Johannesburg. She was subsequently voted player of the match for her efforts.

=== University of the Western Cape ===
In March 2022, she was unveiled as one of 11 new signings by the university. In the 2024 season, she scored a brace in the 7–1 win over First Touch.
