= Regirl Ngobeni =

South African teacher and soccer player

Personal information
- Full name: Regirl Makhaukane Ngobeni
- Date of birth: 29 February 1996 (age 30)
- Place of birth: Dennilton, Limpopo, South Africa
- Position: Goalkeeper

Team information
- Current team: University of the Western Cape

Youth career
- –: Seven Stars

Senior career*
| Years | Team | Apps | (Gls) |
| 2015–2016 | NWU Tawana | | |
| 2017–2025 | University of the Western Cape | | |

International career
- South Africa U17
| 2013–2015 | South Africa U20 | | |
| 2021–2025 | South Africa | | |
Medal record
Representing South Africa
Women's Africa Cup of Nations
| First place | 2022 Morocco |
- * Club domestic league appearances and goals

Regirl Makhaukane Ngobeni (born 29 February 1996) is a South African teacher and former soccer player who played as a goalkeeper.

== Playing career ==
In 2017, she joined UWC as their first choice keeper. They were runner's up for the 2018 and 2019 Women's Varsity Football competition.

In 2018, she was part of the team that won the Western Cape Sasol Women's League.

In the 2021 SAFA Women's League season, Ngobeni walked away with the goalkeeper of the season award after keeping 6 clean sheets in 12 matches.

In the 2022 SAFA Women's League season, she was the second best keeper with 16 clean sheets in 26 matches. For the 2023 season, she was the third best keeper with 12 clean sheets in 28 matches.

=== International career ===
In September 2021, she officially got her first Banyana Banyana call-up. Ngobeni was part of the South African women's national team at the 2022 Women's Africa Cup of Nations where they won their first continental title.

== Personal life ==
She graduated with a Bachelor of Education from the University of the Western Cape in 2022.

== Honours ==
South Africa

- Women's Africa Cup of Nations: 2022

University of the Western Cape

- SAFA Women's League runners-up: 2021, 2022, 2023
- Western Cape Sasol League: 2018
- Women's Varsity Football runners-up: 2018, 2019

Individual

- 2021 SAFA Women's League: Goalkeeper of the Season
