= Miche Minnies =

South African soccer player (born 2001)

Personal information
- Full name: Miche Desiree Minnies
- Date of birth: 14 November 2001 (age 24)
- Place of birth: Mitchells Plain, Western Cape, South Africa
- Height: 1.56 m (5 ft 1 in)
- Position: Forward

Team information
- Current team: Diepkloof Ladies
- Number: 14

Senior career*
Years	Team	Apps	(Gls)
2022–2025	Mamelodi Sundowns		
2026–	Diepkloof Ladies		

International career
2018	South Africa U17	2	(4)
2022–	South Africa		
Medal record
Representing South Africa
First place	2022 Morocco
- * Club domestic league appearances and goals

Miche Minnies (born 14 November 2001) is a South African soccer player who plays as a forward for SAFA Women's League club Diepkloof Ladies and the South Africa women's national team.

== Club career ==
In 2022, Minnies signed a four-year deal with SAFA League side Mamelodi Sundowns. She scored 23 goals in her debut season for the club.

By August or September 2023, she blew off the internet after Mamelodi Sundowns beat Olympic de Moroni by 8–0, due to her similar appearance with Ronaldinho Gaucho.

She scored a brace in her first match of the 2024 season in a 5–1 win over Durban Ladies on 24 March 2024. On 14 April 2024, she scored a hat-trick in a 7–0 win against Lindelani Ladies. She was awarded player of the match for her efforts. She suffered an injury which sidelined her for two months in the 2024.

== International Career ==
Minnies helped the South Africa under-17 team qualify for the 2018 FIFA U-17 Women's World Cup finishing top joint scorer with four goals for the team in qualifying.

== Honours ==
South Africa

- Africa Cup of Nations: 2022,

Individual

- Africa Cup of Nations Team of the Tournament: 2022
- IFFHS CAF Team of The Year: 2022
