= Mpumi Nyandeni =

South African soccer player (born 1987)

Personal information
- Full name: Nompumelelo Nyandeni
- Date of birth: 19 August 1987 (age 39)
- Place of birth: South Africa
- Height: 1.63 m (5 ft 4 in)
- Position: Midfielder

Team information
- Current team: JVW
- Number: 18

Senior career*
Years	Team	Apps	(Gls)
- WFC Rossiyanka
-2022	JVW FC		(55)
2023-2024	TS Galaxy Queens	60	(7)
2024-	JVW FC		

International career^{‡}
2002–2025	South Africa	150	(39)
- * Club domestic league appearances and goals as of 11 August 2014 ‡ National team caps and goals as of 8 April 2025

Nompumelelo "Mpumi" Nyandeni (born 19 August 1987) is a South African soccer player who plays as a midfielder for SAFA Women's League side JVW.

Nyandeni has represented the South Africa women's national football team 150 times, including at both the 2012 and 2016 Summer Olympics. She is the third most capped player for the national team.

In 2010, she took part in a FIFA campaign for improving health through recreational football together with players such as Cristiano Ronaldo, Lionel Messi, and Didier Drogba.

She captained JVW to the national championship in 2019.

In 2022 she was named the South African Football Journalists' Association (Safja) women's footballer of the year.

== Club career ==
Mpumi Nyandeni came through the Mpumalanga-based Detroit Ladies youth system. While a youth player, she competed with older players for positions in the senior side. She subsequently transferred to WFC Rossiyanka in the Russian Women's Football Championship. In 2011, she was selected by FIFA as one of a side of 11 international players to promote health issues among young people; others in the list included Lionel Messi and Cristiano Ronaldo. While at Rossiyanka, she met Refiloe Jane for the first time, who had been inspired by Nyandeni and would later also become a South African international.

=== JVW ===
In 2019 she captained JVW to their maiden trophy when they won the 2019 Sasol League National Championship

In 2021, she was joint top goal scorer with Andisiwe Mgcoyi with 27 goals helping JVW to a top five finish in the league.

She scored 30 goals in the 2022 season and won the top goal scorer award for the second consecutive season.

She rounded off the season by winning the 2022 South African Football Journalists' Association (Safja) Women's footballer of the year award.

=== TS Galaxy Queens ===
In 2023, she joined TS Galaxy Queens. She scored 7 goals for the club during the 2023 season.

=== JVW ===
In March 2024, she rejoined JVW.

== International career ==
She made her national team debut as a 15 year-old in 2002.

Nyandeni was called up to the South Africa women's national football team during the qualification matches for the 2012 Summer Olympics in London, United Kingdom. She was disappointed to be dropped from the squad, which she attributed to her fluctuating form, but was recalled and later played for South Africa in three matches at the Games itself. She has since become one of the most experienced players for the South African team, being one of four players alongside Janine van Wyk, Amanda Dlamini and Noko Matlou who have more than 100 caps each. She was selected once again for the squad for the 2016 Summer Olympics in Rio de Janeiro, Brazil.

In April 2025 she was called up to the squad for her 150th cap. Nyandeni captained Banyana Banyana in her 150th cap in a 2-1 win over Malawi on 8 April 2025 at Lucas Moripe Stadium. She is the third most capped player behind Noko Matlou (174 caps) and Janine van Wyk (185 caps).

=== International goals ===
Scores and results list South Africa's goal tally first

No.	Date	Venue	Opponent	Score	Result	Competition
1	21 November 2018	Cape Coast Sports Stadium, Cape Coast, Ghana	Equatorial Guinea	2–0	7–1	2018 Africa Women Cup of Nations

== Honours ==
- Sasol League National Championship: 2019

Individual

- 2021 SAFA Women's League: Top Goal Scorer (27 goals)
- 2022 SAFA Women's League: Top Goal Scorer (30 goals)
- 2022 South African Football Journalists' Association (Safja): Women's footballer of the year
