= Thandi Rameri =

South African soccer player

Personal information
- Place of birth: Polokwane
- Position: Forward

Team information
- Current team: Copperbelt Ladies
- Number: 13

Senior career*
Years	Team	Apps	(Gls)
2023-	Copperbelt Ladies	28	(2)
- * Club domestic league appearances and goals

Thandi Rameri is a South African track and field athlete and soccer player who plays as a forward for SAFA Women's League club Copperbelt Ladies.

== Personal life ==
She attended Hoërskool Westenburg Secondary School in Polokwane, Limpopo.

== Club career ==
She joined SAFA Women's League side Copperbelt Ladies in 2023. She scored 2 goals for the side in her debut season.

On 31 March 2024, she scored her first hat-trick against Thunderbirds Ladies in a 6–1 home win which helped her team to a 6-game unbeaten streak as the team recorded their best start to the league in recent history.

== Athletics ==
In March 2018, Rameri obtained gold medals in the women's long jump and women's triple jump at the Limpopo Regional P1 provincial athletics meeting. Her wins qualified her for the national championship to be held in Cape Town. She joined the SA Athletics Club to help prepare for the national championship.

== Honours ==
- Limpopo Regional P1: Long Jump: 2018
- Limpopo Regional P1: Triple Jump: 2018
