= 2024 SAFA Women's League =

SAFA Women's League
- Season: 2024
- Dates: 2 March 2024 - 8 December 2024
- Champions: Mamelodi Sundowns Ladies (7th title)
- Promoted: Ezemvelo; University of Cape Town
- Relegated: Thunderbirds Ladies; Lindelani Ladies
- Matches: 240
- Goals: 692 (2.88 per match)
- Top goalscorer: Boitumelo Rabale (17 goals)
- Biggest home win: Mamelodi Sundowns Ladies 8-0 UP (25 May 2024); Mamelodi Sundowns Ladies 8-0 Richmond United (6 July 2024)
- Biggest away win: Thunderbirds Ladies 0-13 Mamelodi Sundowns Ladies (28 September 2024)
- Highest scoring: Thunderbirds Ladies 0-13 Mamelodi Sundowns Ladies (28 September 2024)
- Longest winning run: Mamelodi Sundowns Ladies (14 games)
- Longest unbeaten run: Mamelodi Sundowns Ladies (26 games)
- Longest winless run: Thunderbirds Ladies (30 games)
- Longest losing run: Lindelani Ladies (18 games)
- All statistics correct as of 10 November 2024.

The 2024 SAFA Women's League, commonly known as 2024 Hollywoodbets Super League, is the fifth season of the professional SAFA Women's League, and the 16th season of nation-wide league competition in women's football in South Africa. It is the 3rd season played with 16 teams.

Mamelodi Sundowns Ladies won their fifth consecutive league title.

== Teams and location ==
In the 2023 season, Ma-Indies Ladies and Coal City Wizards were relegated to the Sasol Women's League, while Sasol Women's League winners UFH Ladies F.C. and runner-ups Lindelani Ladies were promoted to the league.

Location of teams in 2024 SAFA WOMEN'S LEAGUE

Team	Location	Stadium	Capacity	2023 Season
City Lads	New Brighton	Isaac Wolfson Stadium	10,000	13th
Copperbelts Ladies	Polokwane	Baroka Village	1000	12th
Durban Ladies	Umlazi	Sugar Ray Xulu Stadium	6500	8th
First Touch F.C.	Polokwane	Baroka Village	1000	11th
JVW F.C.	Bedfordview	Wits Stadium	5000	3rd
Lindelani Ladies	Ntuzuma	Princess Magogo Stadium	12,000	2nd in SWL
Mamelodi Sundowns Ladies	Pretoria	Lucas Moripe Stadium	28,900	1st
Richmond United	De Aar	Merino Park Stadium	200	7th
Royal AM Women	Pietermaritzburg	Harry Gwala Stadium	6500	5th
Thunderbirds Ladies	Butterworth	Sisa Dukashe Stadium	17,000	14th
TS Galaxy Queens	Mbombela	Solomon Mahlangu Stadium	5000	4th
TUT Matsatsantsa	Pretoria	TUT Stadium	2500	10th
UFH Ladies	Alice	Davidson Stadium	200	1st in SWL
UJ Ladies	Auckland Park	UJ Stadium	8000	9th
UP-Tuks Ladies	Hatfield	Tuks Stadium	14,150	6th
UWC Ladies	Bellville	UWC Stadium	2500	2nd

== League table ==
Pos	Team	Pld	W	D	L	GF	GA	GD	Pts	Qualification or relegation
1	Mamelodi Sundowns Ladies	30	27	2	1	114	12	+102	83	COSAFA Champions League
2	University of the Western Cape	30	22	3	5	76	22	+54	69	
3	TS Galaxy Queens	30	20	5	5	67	28	+39	65	
4	University of Johannesburg	30	20	5	5	56	20	+36	65	
5	JVW	30	15	10	5	48	24	+24	55	
6	First Touch	30	13	5	12	39	50	−11	44	
7	Royal AM Women	30	11	10	9	50	42	+8	43	
8	University of Pretoria	30	11	9	10	39	45	−6	42	
9	University of Fort Hare	30	11	6	13	37	46	−9	39	
10	Richmond United	30	9	9	12	42	50	−8	36	
11	TUT Matsatsantsa Ladies	30	10	5	15	44	53	−9	35	
12	Copperbelt Ladies	30	7	8	15	30	41	−11	29	
13	Durban Ladies	30	6	7	17	34	59	−25	25	
14	City Lads	30	5	8	17	28	53	−25	23	
15	Lindelani Ladies	30	5	1	24	24	66	−42	16	Relegation
16	Thunderbirds Ladies	30	0	3	27	12	129	−117	3	Relegation

Source: https://blog.hollywoodbets.net/hollywoodbets-super-league/
https://inqaku.com/leagues/view?season_id=10796&stream_id=-1

== Results ==
Home \ Away	CLD	CBL	DBN	FT	JVW	LNL	MSD	RMU	RAM	TBL	TUT	TSG	UFH	UJ	UP	UWC
City Lads		1–0	1–2	0–1	1–1	0–1	0–1	0–3	1–1	4–1	0–3	0–2	1–1	2–3	1–1	1–2
Copperbelt Ladies	1–1		4–1	1–1	0–1	1–1	0–2	1–0	1–0	6–1	1–3	0–1	0–3	0–1	0–1	2–2
Durban Ladies	1–0	1–1		2–1	1–2	0–1	1–5	1–1	3–3	6–1	1–2	2–4	1–1	0–0	2–0	0–5
First Touch	2–1	0–1	3–1		0–1	1–0	0–5	0–2	1–1	0–0	4–1	1–2	1–0	1–4	0–1	0–2
JVW	0–0	1–1	3–0	1–2		2–0	1–1	2–1	0–0	4–0	3–2	0–2	5–1	1–1	2–1	1–0
Lindelani Ladies	1–2	1–2	0–1	1–4	0–4		0–2	3–1	0–3	3–0	0–3	1–6	1–2	1–2	1–3	0–2
Mamelodi Sundowns	7–1	3–2	5–1	6–0	1–0	7–0		8–0	4–0	5–1	5–0	1–0	1–0	2–0	8–0	2–0
Richmond United	2–2	1–1	2–1	1–2	1–1	3–0	0–5		1–2	4–1	2–1	0–4	2–2	0–0	1–1	1–2
Royal AM Women	3–0	2–0	0–0	2–2	1–2	2–1	0–2	1–0		1–0	3–1	1–2	1–1	0–1	3–3	1–1
Thunderbirds Ladies	1–4	0–0	3–3	0–3	0–5	0–4	0–13	0–2	0–5		1–4	0–6	0–4	0–3	1–3	0–7
TUT Matsatsantsa	4–1	2–0	2–3	2–3	0–0	1–0	1–1	1–1	3–2	3–0		0–2	0–1	0–3	1–1	1–2
TS Galaxy Queens	0–0	2–0	1–0	4–0	2–1	2–1	3–5	2–2	3–1	6–0	2–1		0–1	1–4	0–0	1–2
UFH Ladies	1–0	1–2	2–0	0–1	1–1	2–1	0–3	1–4	0–3	5–0	2–1	1–1		0–4	3–2	0–2
UJ Ladies	1–0	3–0	2–0	1–4	3–1	3–0	0–1	2–0	1–1	5–0	2–0	1–1	2–0		1–0	1–2
UP-Tuks Ladies	3–2	3–2	1–0	0–0	0–0	1–0	0–3	2–1	2–5	5–1	0–0	2–3	2–1	1–2		0–0
UWC Ladies	4–0	1–0	2–0	7–1	1–2	4–1	1–0	1–2	6–2	6–0	6–1	0–2	4–0	1–0	1–0	

Updated to match(es) played on 6 October 2024. Source:
Legend: Blue = home team win; Yellow = draw; Red = away team win.

== Notes ==
On 21 April 2024, the match between Royal AM and Lindelani Ladies was interrupted when a brawl erupted between players from both teams. Three players from Lindelani Ladies were suspended for two matches by the South African Football Association (SAFA) Disciplinary Committee.

On the 20th of July the match between UWC and TS Galaxy Queens did not take place as the Galaxy Queens did not show up on time for the match.

Mamelodi Sundowns Ladies scored a league record in a 13–0 win over Thunderbirds Ladies.

== Statistics ==
As of 8 November 2024

=== Top scorer ===
Rank	Player	Club	Goals
1	(Lesotho) Boitumelo Rabale	Mamelodi Sundowns Ladies	17
2	(South Africa) Nthabiseng Majiya	Mamelodi Sundowns Ladies	13
2	(South Africa) Litseoane Maloro	Royal AM Women	13
2	(South Africa) Thato Mofolo	UJ Ladies	13
3	(South Africa) Philisa Mjambane	UWC Ladies	11
3	(South Africa) Gabriela Salgado	JVW	11
7	(South Africa) Gugu Dlamini	UJ Ladies	10
7	(South Africa) Kesha Hendricks	UFH Ladies	10
9	(South Africa) Tanna Hollis	JVW	9
9	(South Africa) Miche Minnies	Mamelodi Sundowns Ladies	9
9	(South Africa) Mamello Makhabane	TS Galaxy Queens	9
11	(South Africa) Sibulele Holweni	UWC Ladies	8
11	(South Africa) Thandi Rameri	Copperbelt Ladies	8
11	(South Africa) Busisiwe Ndimeni	TS Galaxy Queens	8
11	(South Africa) Nomvula Kgoale	TS Galaxy Queens	8
11	(South Africa) Nicole Michael	TS Galaxy Queens	8
11	(South Africa) Nomvuyo Bhengu	Royal AM Women	8

=== Clean sheets ===
Rank	Player	Club	Clean sheets
1	(South Africa) Matshidiso Masebe	UJ Ladies	14
2	(Botswana) Sedilami Boseja	Mamelodi Sundowns Ladies	13
3	(South Africa) Kaylin Swart	JVW	11
4	(South Africa) Siphesihle Dlamini	UWC Ladies	10
5	(South Africa) Dineo Magagula	TS Galaxy Queens	9
6	(South Africa) Andile Dlamini	Mamelodi Sundowns Ladies	8
7	(South Africa) Magabene Polori	First Touch	7
7	(South Africa) Kgothatso Manamela	UP Ladies	7
9	(South Africa) Nelisiwe Mjira	Durban Ladies	5
9	(South Africa) Kebotseng Moletsane	Royal AM	5
11	(South Africa) Nokuphumla Mpatsiyana	UFH Ladies	4
11	(South Africa) Magdalena Motsabi	Richmond United	4

=== Hat-tricks ===
Players who scored a hat-trick during the 2024 season:

Player	For	Against	Result	Date
(South Africa) Inge Kaba	UP Ladies	Lindelani Ladies	1-3 (A)	16 March 2024
(South Africa) Thandi Rameri	Copperbelt Ladies	Thunderbirds Ladies	6-1 (H)	31 March 2024
(South Africa) Miche Minnies	Mamelodi Sundowns Ladies	Lindelani Ladies	7-0 (H)	14 April 2024
(South Africa) Tanna Hollis	JVW	Thunderbirds Ladies	0-5 (A)	20 April 2024
(South Africa) Philisa Mjambane	UWC Ladies	Thunderbirds Ladies	0-7 (A)	11 May 2024
(South Africa) Gabriela Salgado	JVW	Thunderbirds Ladies	4-0 (H)	6 July 2024
(Lesotho) Boitumelo Rabale	Mamelodi Sundowns Ladies	Richmond United	8-0 (H)	6 July 2024
(South Africa) Mpho Bloem	Richmond United	City Lads	0-3 (A)	7 September 2024
(South Africa) Nomfundo Mkhize	Lindelani Ladies	Richmond United	3-1 (H)	15 September 2024
(South Africa) Okuhle Sithole	Durban Ladies	Thunderbirds Ladies	6-1 (H)	21 September 2024
(South Africa) Ronnel Donnelley	UWC Ladies	Thunderbirds Ladies	6-0 (H)	24 September 2024
(South Africa) Rhoda Mulaudzi	Mamelodi Sundowns Ladies	Thunderbirds Ladies	0-13 (A)	28 September 2024

== Awards ==
The following players were rated best in the league:

Award	Winner	Club
Player of the season	(South Africa) Amogelang Motau	UWC Ladies
Fan's Player of the season	(South Africa) Lebogang Ramalepe	Mamelodi Sundowns Ladies
Goalkeeper of the season	(South Africa) Matshidiso Masebe	UJ Ladies
Top goalscorer of the season	(Lesotho) Boitumelo Rabale	Mamelodi Sundowns Ladies
Coach of the season	(South Africa) Jerry Tshabalala	Mamelodi Sundowns Ladies
Young player of the season	(South Africa) Khwezi Khoza	Durban Ladies
Assistant Referee of the Season	Rose Mokoena	
Referee of the Season	Kwandile Somtsai	

Boitumelo Rabale won a second consecutive South African Football Journalists’ Association's (Safja) Women's Footballer of the Year.
