= Khunjulwa Mali =

South African soccer player (born 2002)

Personal information
- Date of birth: July 10, 2002 (age 24)
- Position: Midfielder

Team information
- Current team: Mamelodi Sundowns Ladies
- Number: 20

Youth career
- Mamelodi Sundowns Ladies U/20

Senior career*
Years	Team	Apps	(Gls)
2021-	Mamelodi Sundowns Ladies		
- * Club domestic league appearances and goals

Khunjulwa Mali (born 10 July 2002) is a South African soccer player who plays as a midfielder for SAFA Women's League club Mamelodi Sundowns Ladies.

== History ==
She joined SAFA Women's League team Mamelodi Sundowns Ladies as an academy player. She scored in the 6–1 win over Manzini Wanderers from Eswatini in the 2021 COSAFA Women's Champions League.

In 2022, she was handed the captains armband of the Mamelodi Sundowns Ladies U/20 team for the Women’s Diski Challenge.

In the 2023 season she scored the winner in the 1–0 win over TUT Ladies to help the team move within three points of log leaders UWC Ladies.
