= Seshego Stadium =

Stadium in Seshego, Polokwane, South Africa

- Interactive map of Seshego Stadium
- Address: 114 17th Street, Seshego; Polokwane; South Africa
- Coordinates: 23.85543°S 29.3885°E
- Owner: Polokwane Local Municipality
- Operator: Magesi
- Capacity: 15 000

Construction
- Reopened: 8 February 2025
- Construction cost: R19 million (renovation)

Tenants
- Magesi; Copperbelt Ladies

Seshego Stadium is a multi-use stadium in Seshego, Limpopo, South Africa. It is currently used mostly for soccer matches and is the home venue of Magesi and Copperbelt Ladies.

The stadium was reopened on 8 February 2025 with the first Premiership match held in 23 years seeing Magesi secure a 2–0 victory over Cape Town City.

The first SAFA Women's League match saw Copperbelt Ladies winning 3–0 against Durban Ladies on 15 March 2025.

The Polokwane Local Municipality spent R19 million on the renovation of the stadium.

The stadium has been criticised as being too small for Premiership matches.
