= Hildah Magaia =

South African soccer player (born 1994)

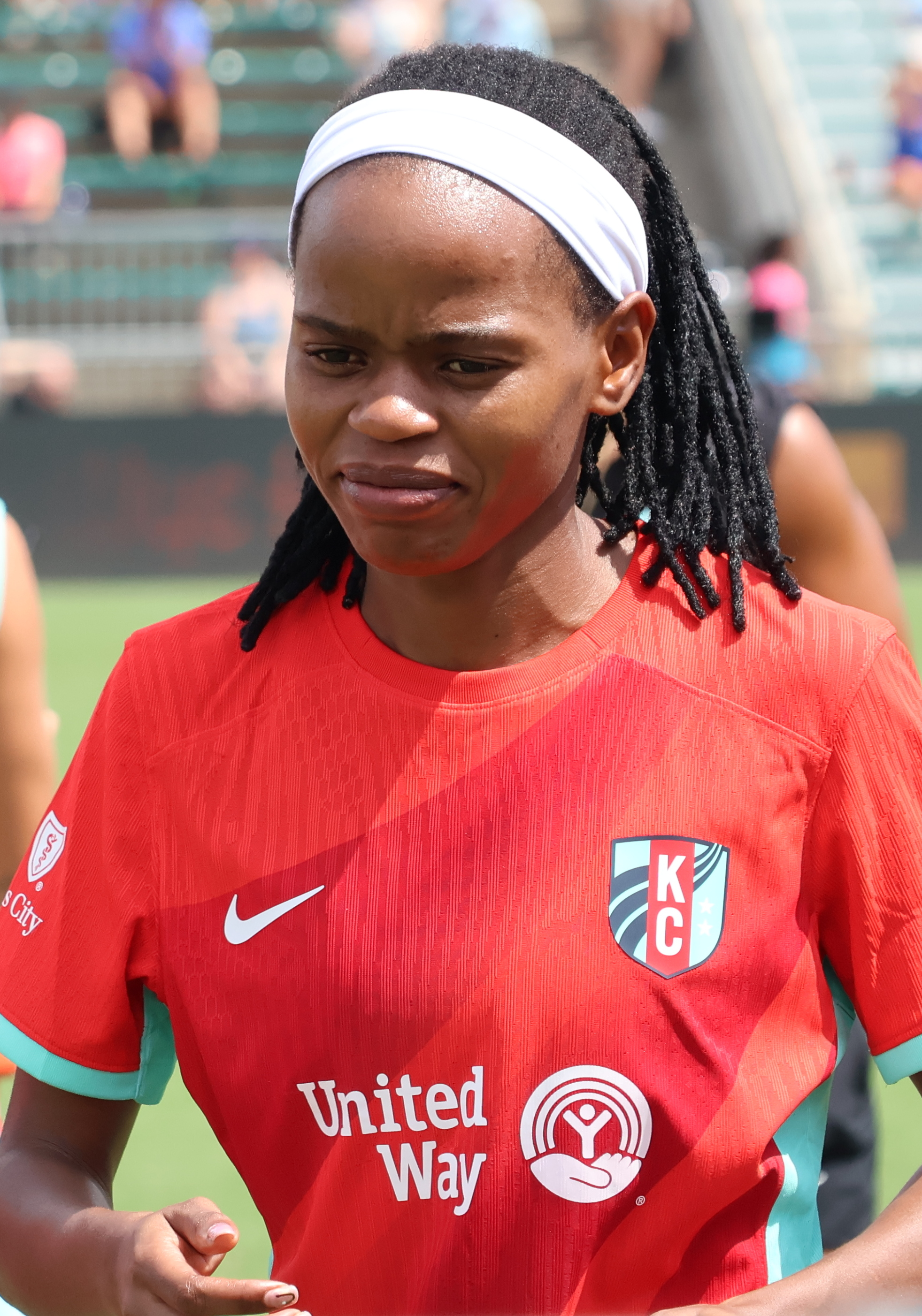
- Magaia with the Kansas City Current in 2024

Personal information
- Full name: Hildah Tholakele Magaia
- Date of birth: 16 December 1994 (age 31)
- Place of birth: Dennilton, South Africa
- Height: 1.64 m (5 ft 5 in)
- Position: Striker

Team information
- Current team: Deportivo de La Coruña

Senior career*
Years	Team	Apps	(Gls)
–2016	University of Pretoria		
2017–2020	Tshwane University of Technology		(50)
2021	Morön	22	(12)
2022–2023	Sejong Sportstoto	21	(9)
2024	Mazatlán	18	(3)
2024	→ Kansas City Current (loan)	6	(0)
2025	Tijuana	25	(6)
2026–	Deportivo de La Coruña		

International career^{‡}
2018–	South Africa	31	(21)
Medal record
Representing South Africa
Women's Africa Cup of Nations
First place	2022 Morocco
COSAFA Women's Championship
Gold medal – first place	2020 South Africa
- * Club domestic league appearances and goals as of 4 November 2024 ‡ National team caps and goals as of 20 July 2023 (prior the 2023 FIFA Women's World Cup)

Hildah Tholakele Magaia (born 16 December 1994) is a South African professional soccer player who plays as a forward for Liga F club Deportivo de La Coruña and the South Africa national team.

Magaia scored the brace that gave South Africa their first Women's Africa Cup of Nations (WAFCON) title in a 2–1 win over Morocco in 2022.

In 2020 she was named the player of the season for the inaugural SAFA Women's League and was joint top scorer.

She was added to the class of 2024 for the Forbes Africa 30 under 30 list featuring uncovering some of the most influential and iconic young people on the continent.

== Club career ==
=== University of Pretoria/Tshwane University of Technology ===
Magaia started her career with South African second-tier side Tuks Ladies. For the 2017 season, Magaia signed for TUT Ladies, helping them to their only league title at the 2018 Sasol League National Championship. She was named Diski Queen on the Tournament, player of the tournament, for the 2018 season.

=== Sejong Sportstoto ===
In 2022, she signed for Sejong Sportstoto in South Korea.

=== Mazatlán ===
In January 2024, Magaia joined Mexican Liga MX Femenil club Mazatlán Femenil.

==== Kansas City Current (loan) ====
On 21 August 2024, the Kansas City Current announced that they had signed Magaia on loan from Mazatlán for the remainder of the 2024 National Women's Soccer League season with the option to acquire her rights on a permanent basis at the conclusion of the loan. The club announced her departure on 19 December 2024.

=== Club Tijuana ===
In January 2025, she made the move to Liga MX Femenil side Club Tijuana.

=== Deportivo de La Coruña ===
In January 2026 she joined Liga F club Deportivo de La Coruña.

== International career ==
Magaia represented South Africa at the 2019 Summer Universiade.

She was voted the Best Player at the 2020 COSAFA Women's Championship tournament, earning herself a 2-year deal with Swedish club Morön BK.

Magaia was part of the Banyana Banyana squad that featured at the 2022 Africa Women Cup of Nations in Morocco. At the tourney, she scored a 63rd-minute winning goal in a 2–1 win Group C match against Nigeria's Super Falcons and also Scored 2 goals in the Final against Morocco to win the trophy for the South African Female National Team.

On 23 July 2023, Magaia scored her first goal in a FIFA Women's World Cup competition in a 1–2 defeat to Sweden in the group stage.

== International goals ==
No.	Date	Venue	Opponent	Score	Result	Competition
1.	10 June 2018	Dr. Petrus Molemela Stadium, Bloemfontein, South Africa	Lesotho	5–0	6–0	2018 Women's Africa Cup of Nations qualification
2.	31 July 2019	Wolfson Stadium, KwaZakele, South Africa	Comoros	11–0	17–0	2019 COSAFA Women's Championship
3.	31 July 2019	Wolfson Stadium, KwaZakele, South Africa	Comoros	14–0	17–0	2019 COSAFA Women's Championship
4.	9 November 2020	Wolfson Stadium, KwaZakele, South Africa	Comoros	3–0	7–0	2020 COSAFA Women's Championship
5.	17 September 2021	Onikan Stadium, Lagos, Nigeria	Ghana	1–0	3–0	Aisha Buhari Cup
6.	26 October 2021	Orlando Stadium, Johannesburg, South Africa	Mozambique	3–0	6–0	2022 Women's Africa Cup of Nations qualification
7.	26 October 2021	Orlando Stadium, Johannesburg, South Africa	Mozambique	4–0	6–0	2022 Women's Africa Cup of Nations qualification
8.	18 February 2022	Orlando Stadium, Johannesburg, South Africa	Algeria	1–0	2–0	2022 Women's Africa Cup of Nations qualification
9.	4 July 2022	Stade Moulay Hassan, Rabat, Morocco	Nigeria	2–0	2–1	2022 Women's Africa Cup of Nations
10.	23 July 2022	Prince Moulay Abdellah Stadium, Rabat, Morocco	Morocco	1–0	2–1	2022 Women's Africa Cup of Nations
11.	23 July 2022	Prince Moulay Abdellah Stadium, Rabat, Morocco	Morocco	2–0	2–1	2022 Women's Africa Cup of Nations
12.	8 October 2022	Kingsmeadow, Kingston upon Thames, England	Australia	1–4	1–4	Friendly
13.	21 February 2023	Miracle Sports Complex, Alanya, Turkey	Slovenia	1–1	1–1	2023 Turkish Women's Cup
14.	10 April 2023	Serbian FA Sports Center, Stara Pazova, Serbia	Serbia	1–3	2–3	Friendly
15.	23 July 2023	Wellington Regional Stadium, Wellington, New Zealand	Sweden	1–0	1–2	2023 FIFA Women's World Cup
16.	2 August 2023	Wellington Regional Stadium, Wellington, New Zealand	Italy	2–1	3–2	2023 FIFA Women's World Cup
17.	30 November 2023	Charles Konan Banny Stadium, Yamoussoukro, Ivory Coast	Burkina Faso	1–0	1–1	2024 Women's Africa Cup of Nations qualification
18.	23 February 2024	Chamazi Stadium, Dar es Salaam, Tanzania	Tanzania	3–0	3–0	2024 CAF Women's Olympic Qualifying Tournament
19.	8 April 2025	UJ Soweto Campus, Johannesburg, South Africa	Malawi	1–1	2–1	Friendly
20.	14 July 2025	Honneur Stadium, Oujda, Morocco	Mali	3–0	4–0	2024 Women's Africa Cup of Nations
21.	31 July 2026	Moulay Rachid Stadium, Casablanca, Morocco	Ivory Coast	2–2	2–2	2026 Women's Africa Cup of Nations

== Honours ==
TUT

- Sasol League National Championship: 2018

Kansas City Current

- NWSL x Liga MX Femenil Summer Cup: 2024

South Africa

- Women's Africa Cup of Nations: 2022
- Cosafa Women's Championship: 2020

Individual

- Women's Africa Cup of Nations Top Scorer: 2022
- Cosafa Women's Championship: Best Player: 2020
- SAFA Women's League: Top Scorer: 2019-20
- SAFA Women's League: Player of the Season: 2019-20
- Sasol Women's League: Diski Queen of the Tournament: 2018
