= Mmabatho Mogale =

South African association football player

Personal information
- Date of birth: 8 July 2005 (age 21)
- Position: Midfielder

Team information
- Current team: University of the Western Cape
- Number: 6

Youth career
- -2023: University of Pretoria

Senior career*
Years	Team	Apps	(Gls)
2024	JVW		
2025-	University of the Western Cape		

International career^{‡}
2022-	South Africa U/20		
2024-	South Africa	2	(0)
- * Club domestic league appearances and goals ‡ National team caps and goals as of 30 October 2024

Mmabatho Mogale is a South African soccer player who plays as a midfielder for SAFA Women's League club UWC Ladies and the South Africa women's national team.

== Club career ==
=== University of Pretoria ===
Mogale studied at TuksSports High School and played for the university in the SAFA Women's League. She was named the SAFA Women's League young player of the season at the end of the 2023 season.

=== JVW ===
In 2024, she joined JVW.

== Youth international career ==
Mogale competed for the South Africa U/20 team at the 2022 African U-20 Women's World Cup qualifiers where they knocked out in the third round by Uganda.

== International career ==
Mogale competed for the senior women's national team at the 2024 COSAFA Women's Championship.

== Honours ==
Individual

- SAFA Women's League: Young Player of the Season: 2023
