= Ma-Indies Ladies F.C. =

- Full name: Ma-Indies Ladies Football Club
- Founder: Falaza Mdaka
- League: Sasol Women's League
- 2024: 7th (Limpopo Stream A)

Ma-Indies Ladies F.C. is a women's soccer club based in Polokwane, Limpopo. The team competes in the Sasol Women's League, the second tier women's football league in South Africa.

== History ==
They won the 2013 Limpopo Sasol Women's League and qualified for the 2013 Sasol League National Championship. They ended the championship as runners-up losing 2–0 to Mamelodi Sundowns Ladies in the final.

They won the 2019 Limpopo Sasol Women's League and lost 2–0 to JVW in the 2019 Sasol League National Championship final. They were one of the first two finalists, the other JVW, to be promoted to the SAFA Women's League.

The finished 8th in the 2021 SAFA Women's League and 2022 SAFA Women's League.

The team was relegated to the Sasol Women's League after finishing last, 16th, in the 2023 SAFA Women's League.

== Notable players ==
=== FIFA World Cup participants ===
List of players that were called up for a FIFA Women's World Cup while playing for the club. In brackets, the tournament played:

- (South Africa) Noko Matlou (2019)
- (South Africa) Lebogang Ramalepe (2019)

== Honours ==
- Limpopo Sasol Women's League:2013, 2019
- Sasol League National Championship: Runners-up:2013, 2019

== Team statistics ==
=== SAFA Women's League record ===
Season	Pos	Record							
Season	Pos	P	W	D	L	F	A	GD	Pst
2021	8th place	26	8	7	11	38	49	(11)	11
2022	8th place	30	14	5	11	42	45	(3)	47
2023	16th place	30	2	2	26	18	78	(60)	8

- Orange = In progress
- Gold = Champions
- Silver = Runner up

==== SAFA Women's League statistics ====
- Record number of games won in a season: 14 games (2022)
- Record number of points in a season: 47 points (2022)
- Record goals scored in a season: 42 goals (2022)
- Record for lowest number of goals conceded in a season: 45 goals (2022)
- Record for lowest number of defeats in a season: 11 games (2021, 2022)
