= 2023 SAFA Women's League =

SAFA Women's League
- Season: 2023
- Dates: 4 Feb 2023 - 6 Dec 2023
- Champions: Mamelodi Sundowns Ladies (6th title)
- Promoted: University of Fort Hare; Lindelani Ladies
- Relegated: Coal City Wizards; Ma-Indies Ladies
- 2024 COSAFA Women's Champions League: University of the Western Cape
- Matches: 240
- Goals: 697 (2.9 per match)
- Best Player: Boitumelo Rabale
- Top goalscorer: Sphumelele Shamase (22 goals)
- Best goalkeeper: Kaylin Swart
- Biggest home win: Mamelodi Sundowns Ladies 11-0 Coal City Wizards (18 October 2023))
- Biggest away win: Coal City Wizards 0-9 Mamelodi Sundowns Ladies (7 May 2023)
- Highest scoring: Mamelodi Sundowns Ladies 11-0 Coal City Wizards (18 October 2023)
- Longest winning run: (14 games); UWC
- Longest unbeaten run: (17 games); Mamelodi Sundowns Ladies
- Longest winless run: (17 games); Ma-Indies Ladies
- Longest losing run: (13 games); Ma-Indies Ladies
- All statistics correct as of 21 December 2023.

The 2023 SAFA Women's League was the fourth season of the professional SAFA Women's League, and the 15th season of nation-wide league competition in women's football in South Africa. It was the 2nd season played with 16 teams.

== Teams ==
The 2022 season ended with Golden Ladies and Tsunami Queens relegated to the Sasol Women's League, while Vasco Da Gama changed its name to TS Galaxy Queens after it was purchased by Tim Sukazi, who owns TS Galaxy FC. Bloemfontein Celtic Ladies sold its status to Shauwn Mkhize, and was replaced by Royal AM. Two teams joined the league. Copperbelt Ladies won the 2021 Sasol League National Championship, while the University of Pretoria were runners-up.

Stadiums and Locations

Team	Location	Stadium	Capacity	2022 season
City Lads	Ibhayi	Isaac Wolfson Stadium	10,000	12th
Coal City Wizards	eMalahleni	Puma Stadium	24,000	13th
Copperbelt Ladies	Polokwane	Rugby field adjoining Old Peter Mokaba Stadium		2nd in SWL
Durban Ladies	Durban	Sugar Ray Xulu Stadium	6,500	10th
First Touch FC	Polokwane	Baroka Village	1,000	9th
JVW FC	Johannesburg	Wits Stadium	5,000	4th
Ma-Indies Ladies	Polokwane	Giyani Stadium	20,000	8th
Mamelodi Sundowns Ladies	Pretoria	Loftus versfeid stadium	51,762	1st
Richmond United	Northern Cape	Merino Park Stadium	200	7th
Royal AM	Pietermaritzburg	Harry Gwala Stadium	6,500	6th
Thunderbirds Ladies	Gqeberha	Sisa Dukashe Stadium	17,000	11th
TS Galaxy Queens	Mbombela	Solomon Mahlangu Stadium	5,000	14th
Tswane University of Technology	Pretoria	TUT Stadium	2,500	4th
University of Johannesburg	Johannesburg	UJ Stadium	8,000	5th
University of Pretoria	Pretoria	UJ Stadium	8,000	1st in SWL
University of Western Cape	Cape Town	UWC Stadium	2,500	2nd

N.B. some teams play their home matches at multiple stadia (e.g. some of Durban Ladies 2023 matches were played at Noordelikes Rugby Club in Polokwane); locations listed above were the most common location for 2023 home matches.

== Table ==
Pos	Team	Pld	W	D	L	GF	GA	GD	Pts	Qualification or relegation
1	Mamelodi Sundowns Ladies(C)	30	26	3	1	97	15	+82	81	Champions League Qualifiers
2	University of the Western Cape	30	25	0	5	66	17	+49	75	Champions League Qualifiers
3	JVW	30	19	6	5	53	28	+25	63	
4	TS Galaxy Queens	30	18	7	5	62	22	+40	61	
5	Royal AM Women	30	16	7	7	53	29	+24	55	
6	University of Pretoria	30	16	4	10	54	34	+20	52	
7	Richmond United	30	13	9	8	48	42	+6	48	
8	Durban Ladies	30	14	2	14	53	53	0	44	
9	University of Johannesburg	30	13	4	13	53	40	+13	43	
10	Tshwane University of Technology	30	11	3	16	34	34	0	36	
11	First Touch FC	30	8	7	15	30	51	−21	31	
12	Copperbelt Ladies	30	7	5	18	26	58	−32	26	
13	City Lads	30	7	4	19	29	66	−37	25	
14	Thunderbirds Ladies	30	5	5	20	22	59	−37	20	
15	Coal City Wizards(R)	30	5	2	23	32	104	−72	17	Relegation to the Sasol Women's League
16	Ma-Indies Ladies (R)	30	2	2	26	18	78	−60	8	Relegation to the Sasol Women's League

Source: https://inqaku.com/leagues/view?season_id=8102&stream_id=-1

== Statistics ==
=== Top scorers ===
As of 21 November 2023

Rank	Player	Club	Goals
1	(South Africa) Sphumelele Shamase	University of Johannesburg	22
2	(Lesotho) Boitumelo Rabale	Mamelodi Sundowns Ladies	19
3	(South Africa) Andisiwe Mgcoyi	Mamelodi Sundowns Ladies	17
4	(South Africa) Lucia Gaonwe	Durban Ladies	15
5	(South Africa) Nomvuyo Bhengu	Royal AM Women	14
5	(South Africa) Melinda Kgadiete	Mamelodi Sundowns Ladies	14
5	(South Africa) Nicole Michael	TS Galaxy Queens	14
9	(South Africa) Kgalebane Mohlakoana	Royal AM Ladies	13
9	(South Africa) Michelle Sampson	Richmond United	13

=== Most clean sheets ===
Rank	Player	Club	Clean sheets
1	(South Africa) Kaylin Swart	JVW FC	14
2	(South Africa) Kebotseng Moletsane	Royal AM Women	12
2	(South Africa) Regirl Ngobeni	UWC	12
4	(Botswana) Sedilame Boseja	Mamelodi Sundowns Ladies FC	10
5	(Zimbabwe) Elizabeth Mazivise	University of Johannesburg	9
6	(South Africa) Dineo Magagula	TS Galaxy Queens	8
7	(South Africa) Dineo Kabai	Richmond United	7
8	(South Africa) Andile Dlamini	Mamelodi Sundowns Ladies FC	5
8	(South Africa) Asa Rabalao	UP-Tuks Ladies	5
8	(South Africa) Magabene Polori	First Touch FC	5

== Awards ==
Award	Winner	Club
Player of the season	(Lesotho) Boitumelo Rabale	Mamelodi Sundowns Ladies
Fan's Player of the season	(South Africa) Chuene Morifi	Mamelodi Sundowns Ladies
Goalkeeper of the season	(South Africa) Kaylin Swart	JVW
Top goalscorer of the season	(South Africa) Sphumelele Shamase	University of Johannesburg
Coach of the season	(South Africa) Thinasonke Mbuli	UWC
Young player of the season	(South Africa) Mmabatho Mogale	UP-Tuks Ladies
Administrator of the season	(South Africa) Boitumelo Lekalakala	UP-Tuks Ladies

Boitumelo Rabale was crowned the South African Football Journalists’ Association’s (Safja) Women’s Footballer of the Year.
