= Stellenbosch Women's F.C. =

- Full name: Stellenbosch Women's Football Club
- Nicknames: Stellies; The Maroons
- Founded: 2024; 2 years ago
- Head coach: (South Africa) Nathan Peskin
- League: 2026 SAFA Women's League
- 1st (Western Cape)
- Website: www.stellenboschfootballclub.co.za
Home colours	Away colours

Stellenbosch Women's Football Club is a women's football club based in Stellenbosch, South Africa. The team competes in the SAFA Women's League, the top tier women's football league in South Africa.

== History ==
The club was founded in 2024 following the purchase of Stellenbosch University Women's F.C.'s status. They played their first match on 27 April 2024 and drew 0-0 with Badgers F.C.

== Team ==
=== Players ===
Stellenbosch Women's F.C. squad for 2024 season.

Note: Flags indicate national team as defined under FIFA eligibility rules; some limited exceptions apply. Players may hold more than one non-FIFA nationality.

No.	Pos.	Nation	Player
—	GK	RSA	Chrizaan Smith
—	GK	RSA	Mbali Radebe
—	DF	RSA	Mantombi Jingqi
—	DF	RSA	Lelethu Daniso
—	DF	RSA	Ashulita Hartogh
—	DF	RSA	Ongeziwe Shenxani
—	DF	RSA	Tanisha Williams
—	DF	RSA	Kelso Peskin
—	DF	RSA	Raeesah Satarien
—	MF	RSA	Zelda Fransman
—	MF	RSA	Christelene Jantjies
—	MF	RSA	Tercia van Wyk
—	MF	RSA	Nomthandoso Mokwena

No.	Pos.	Nation	Player
—	MF	FIN	Victoria Dalkarl
—	MF	RSA	Anelisiwe Ngcobo
—	MF	RSA	Luna November
—	MF	RSA	Astria Boks
—	MF	RSA	Jordan Baartman
—	MF	RSA	Aaqilah Alfreds
—	MF	RSA	Karen Jansen
—	MF	RSA	Abongile Mbau
—	FW	RSA	Lethuthando Mthembu
—	FW	RSA	Colleen Armoed
—	FW	RSA	Dione Louw
—	FW	RSA	Chelsea Petersen
—	FW	RSA	Azuzile Magqaka
—	FW	RSA	Nolubabalo Sishuba

=== Technical team ===
Position	Staff
Head Coach	(South Africa) Nathan Peskin
Assistant Coach	(South Africa) Allan Theunissen
Team Manager	(South Africa) Ilze Jones
Performance coach	(South Africa) Kristen Block
Goalkeeper coach	(South Africa) Lee Langeveldt

== Notable players ==
=== CAF African Schools Football Championship ===
List of players that were called up for a CAF African Schools Football Championship while playing for Stellenbosch Women. In brackets, the tournament played:

- (South Africa) Lethuthando Mthembu (2024)
