= JVW F.C. =

- Full name: JVW Football Club
- Nickname: The Blue Diamonds
- Short name: JVW
- Founded: 2012; 14 years ago
- Stadium: UJ Soweto Stadium
- Capacity: 5,000
- Co-Founder: Janine van Wyk and Lauren Duncan
- Head Coach: (South Africa) Janine van Wyk
- League: SAFA Women's League
- 2025: 2nd
- Website: https://www.jvw5.co.za/

Active departments of JVW
- Football: Football Academy

JVW Football Club is a women's professional soccer club based in Bedfordview, Gauteng. Founded and owned by Janine van Wyk and Lauren Duncan the club competes in the SAFA Women's League, the top tier women's football league in South Africa,

== History ==
=== Establishment ===
JVW FC was formed in 2012 by Janine van Wyk, which aimed to identify, develop, improve and expose female football players. The club consisted of a mere 13 players when formed and has gradually grown over the years to 98 players in the club setup.

=== Sasol League, 2013–2019 ===
In 2016, JVW won the Gauteng Sasol League and finished in second place at their Debut National Championship after losing 1–0 to Bloemfontein Celtic Ladies. In 2019 JVW won the Gauteng Sasol League for a second time and went on to be crowned Champions at the National Championship, led by captain Nompumelelo Nyandeni. In the same year, the club signed Olympic gold medallist Caster Semenya.

=== SA Women's National league 2021–present ===
In 2019 the first team recorded their best season to date, where they won the 2019 Gauteng Sasol League and went on to be crowned Champions at the 2019 Sasol League Playoff Finals, securing promotion into the South African Football Association Women's National League which was launched in 2019, becoming the first team to ever gain promotion into this top flight league. JVW FC finished the 2023 season in 3rd place, their best finish since their promotion to the top division.

== Players ==
=== Current First Team Squad ===
As of 28 January 2024

Note: Flags indicate national team as defined under FIFA eligibility rules; some limited exceptions apply. Players may hold more than one non-FIFA nationality.

No.	Pos.	Nation	Player
1	GK	RSA	Kaylin Swart
3	FW	RSA	Amanda Mthandi
4	DF	RSA	Taylor Berkovic
6	FW	RSA	Bongiwe Thusi
7	DF	RSA	Nomathemba Ntsibande
8	MF	RSA	Alochia Lelaka
9	FW	RSA	Gabriela Salgado
10	MF	RSA	Robyn Moodaly
12	DF	RSA	Nomathansanqa Sikweza
13	DF	RSA	Boitumelo Rasehlo
15	FW	RSA	Nokwazi Mnomiya
17	DF	RSA	Talia Swartboii
18	FW	RSA	Nompumelelo Nyandeni

No.	Pos.	Nation	Player
19	FW	RSA	Keolebogile Putu
20	DF	SWE	Julia Molin
21	FW	RSA	Aliyaah Allie
22	MF	RSA	Jessica Wade
23	FW	RSA	Tanna Hollis
28	FW	RSA	Lerato Makhanya
30	DF	RSA	Nelisiwe Mchunu
34	DF	RSA	Zethu Biyana
35	MF	RSA	Mmabatho Mogale
44	MF	RSA	Jabulile Mazibuko
47	MF	RSA	Julia Goncalves

== Notable players ==
=== FIFA World Cup participants ===
List of players that were called up for a FIFA Women's World Cup while playing for the club. In brackets, the tournament played:

- (South Africa) Mamello Makhabane (2019)
- (South Africa) Janine Van Wyk (2019)
- (South Africa) Kaylin Swart (2023)
- (South Africa) Gabriela Salgado (2023)
- (South Africa) Robyn Moodaly (2023)

== Management ==
=== Current Coaching staff ===
As of 6 January 2025

Position	Name
First team head coach	
First team assistant coach	Janine van Wyk
First team goalkeeper Coach	Bafana Nhlapo
Reserve team head coach	Ronald Molepo
Rubies team head coach	Djion Hungwe
U 16 head coach	Samuel Dube
U14 head coach	Cebile Maseko
Developing diamonds head coach	Nicola Schulz

=== Management Staff ===
As of 6 January 2025

Position	Name
JVW FC Co-Founder	Janine van Wyk
JVW FC Co-Founder	Lauren Duncan
Administrator	Cebile Maseko
Head of operations	Talia Swartbooi

== JVW Girls Football Development ==
=== Reserve Team ===
The club's academy JVW Girls competes in the Sasol, Gauteng Development and region leagues with girls as young as 11-years old participating.

=== Development Team ===
This team is considered as a beginners group for girls between the age of 8 to 14 years old. A former JVW player, Nicola Schulz, was appointed as head coach. After suffering an ACL injury in 2019, she went on to pursue coaching career.

=== JVW Girls School League ===
JVW Girls School League is a youth development league for schools located around Gauteng. The league has played a huge role in discovering young talent for (U/15, U/17 and older) youth national teams.

== Sponsors ==
=== Sponsors ===
- Mitre

=== Partners ===
- Forwardzone
- Action breaks silence

== Honours ==
- SAFA Women's League: Runners-up: 2025
- Sasol League National Championship: 2019
- Gauteng Sasol Women's League: 2016, 2019

== Team statistics ==
=== SAFA Women's League record ===
Season	Pos	Record							
Season	Pos	P	W	D	L	F	A	GD	Pst
2021	Fourth place	26	16	3	7	69	29	40	51
2022	Fourth place	30	19	3	8	82	33	49	60
2023	Third place	30	19	6	5	53	28	25	63
2024	5th place	30	15	10	5	48	24	24	55
2025	Runners-Up	30	21	6	3	61	20	41	69

- Orange = In progress
- Gold = Champions
- Silver = Runner up

==== SAFA Women's League statistics ====
- Record number of games won in a season: 21 games (2025)
- Record number of points in a season: 69 points (2025)
- Record goals scored in a season: 82 goals (2022)
- Record for lowest number of goals conceded in a season: 30 goals (2025)
- Record for lowest number of defeats in a season: 3 games (2025)

== See also ==
- JVW Girls
- Mamelodi Sundowns Ladies
- TS Galaxy Queens
- Durban Ladies
