= 2021 SAFA Women's League =

2021 Women's Football league season

SAFA Women's League
- Season: 2021
- Dates: 24 Apr 2021 - 5 Dec 2021
- Champions: Mamelodi Sundowns Ladies (4th title)
- Promoted: City Lads; Vasco Da Gama
- COSAFA Women's Champions League: Mamelodi Sundowns Ladies
- Matches: 182
- Goals: 577 (3.17 per match)
- Best player: Bambanani Mbane
- Top goalscorer: Andisiwe Mgcoyi (27 goals); Nompumelelo Nyandeni (27 goals)
- Best goalkeeper: Regirl Ngobeni
- All statistics correct as of 13 November 2023.

The 2021 SAFA Women's League was the 2nd season of the fully-professional SAFA Women's League, and the 13th season of nation-wide league competition in women's club football in South Africa.

== Teams ==
=== Team changes ===
Joining the 12 teams from the inaugural 2019-20 competition were the two finalists from the 2019 Sasol League National Championship: JVW and Ma-Indies Ladies. No teams were relegated after the previous season per the expansion plan announced at the league launch in 2019; relegation would commence at the end of the 2022 season.

=== Stadiums and locations ===
Location of teams in 2021 SAFA WOMEN'S LEAGUE

Team	Location	Stadium	Capacity
Bloemfontein Celtic Ladies	Bloemfontein	Siwelele Park Stadium	1,000
Coal City Wizards	Johannesburg	Puma Stadium	24,000
Durban Ladies	Durban	Sugar Ray Xulu Stadium	6,500
First Touch	Polokwane	Baroka village	1,000
Golden Ladies	Johannesburg	Montshioa Stadium	
JVW FC	Johannesburg	Wits Stadium	5,000
Ma-Indies Ladies	Polokwane	Giyani Stadium	20,000
Mamelodi Sundowns Ladies	Pretoria	Loftus versfeid stadium	51,762
Richmond United	Northern Cape	Merino Park Stadium	200
Thunderbirds Ladies	Gqeberha	Sisa Dukashe Stadium	17,000
TUT ladies	Pretoria	TUT Stadium	2,500
UJ Ladies	Johannesburg	UJ Soweto Stadium	8,000
UWC Ladies	Cape Town	UWC Stadium	2,500

== Table ==
As of 13 November 2023

Pos	Team	Pld	W	D	L	GF	GA	GD	Pts	Qualification or relegation
1	Mamelodi Sundowns Ladies (C)	26	24	1	1	87	14	+73	73	Champions League Qualifiers
2	TUT Ladies	26	18	5	3	58	21	+37	59	
3	UWC FC	26	15	8	3	47	16	+31	53	
4	JVW	26	16	3	7	69	29	+40	51	
5	First Touch	26	10	10	6	42	35	+7	40	
6	Bloem Celtic Ladies	26	12	3	11	37	39	−2	39	
7	Thunderbirds Ladies	26	10	5	11	29	40	−11	35	
8	Ma-Indies Ladies	26	8	7	11	38	49	−11	31	
9	UJ Ladies	26	7	8	11	26	39	−13	29	
10	Durban Ladies	26	6	8	12	36	44	−8	26	
11	Richmond United	26	7	5	14	44	60	−16	26	
12	Coal City Wizards	26	6	5	15	25	39	−14	23	
13	Golden Ladies	26	5	1	20	18	65	−47	16	
14	Tsunami Queens	26	2	3	21	21	87	−66	9	

Source: Hollywoodbets Super League 2021

(C) Champion

== Awards ==
The awards are also sponsored by Hollywoodbets, and were held on 26 March 2022.

Award	Winner	Club
Goalkeeper of the Season	Regirl Ngobeni	UWC
Player of the Season	Bambanani Mbane	Mamelodi Sundowns Ladies
Coach of the Season	Jerry Tshabalala	Mamelodi Sundowns Ladies
Top goalscorer	Andisiwe Mgcoyi	Mamelodi Sundowns Ladies
Top goalscorer	Nompumelelo Nyandeni	JVW
Young Player of the Season	Nthabiseng Majiya	Richmond United

Mbane was crowned the South African Football Journalists’ Association’s (Safja) Women’s Footballer of the Year.

== See also ==
- 2021-22 South African Premier Division
