= 2019–20 SAFA Women's League =

2021 Women's Football league season

SAFA Women's League
- Season: 2019-20
- Dates: 24 August 2019 - 29 March 2020
- Champions: Mamelodi Sundowns Ladies (3rd title)
- COSAFA Women's Champions League: Mamelodi Sundowns Ladies
- Matches: 132
- Goals: 525 (3.98 per match)
- Best player: Hildah Magaia
- Top goalscorer: Rhoda Mulaudzi and Hildah Magaia (36 goals)
- Best goalkeeper: Andile Dlamini
- Biggest home win: Mamelodi Sundowns Ladies 11-1 First Touch (15 February 2020)
- Biggest away win: UJ Ladies 0-10TUT Ladies (11 January 2020)
- Highest scoring: Mamelodi Sundowns Ladies 11-1 First Touch (15 February 2020)
- Longest winning run: Mamelodi Sundowns Ladies (21 games)
- Longest unbeaten run: Mamelodi Sundowns Ladies (22 games)*
- All statistics correct as of 27 March 2024.

The 2019-20 SAFA Women's League was the inaugural season of the fully-professional SAFA Women's League, and the 12th season of nation-wide league competition in women's club football in South Africa.

The nine provincial winners who qualified for the 2018 Sasol League National Championship were promoted to form part of the SAFA Women's National League (SWNL). In addition, three teams were invited to take part, namely Tsunami Queens, UJ Ladies and Mamelodi Sundowns Ladies.

Mamelodi Sundowns Ladies set a new SWNL goal scoring record when they defeated First Touch 11-1 on 15 February 2020.

== Teams ==
A list of the teams that took part in the inaugural SAFA Women's League:

Team	Province
Thunderbirds Ladies	Eastern Cape
Bloemfontein Celtics Ladies	Free State
Tsunami Queens*	Free State
Mamelodi Sundowns Ladies*	Gauteng
TUT Ladies	Gauteng
UJ Ladies*	Gauteng
Durban Ladies	Kwa-Zulu Natal
First Touch	Limpopo
Coal City Wizards	Mpumalanga
Richmond United	Northern Cape
Golden Ladies	North West
UWC Ladies	Western Cape

*invited team

== Stadiums and locations ==
Location of teams in 2019-20 SAFA WOMEN'S LEAGUE

Team	Location	Stadium	Capacity
Bloemfontein Celtics Ladies	Bloemfontein	Siwelele Park Stadium	1,000
Coal City Wizards	Emalahleni	Puma Stadium	24,000
Durban Ladies	Durban	Sugar Ray Xulu Stadium	6,500
First Touch	Polokwane	Baroka Village	1,000
Golden Ladies	Mahikeng	Montshioa Stadium	
Mamelodi Sundowns Ladies	Pretoria	Loftus Versfeld Stadium	51,762
Richmond United	Northern Cape	Merino Park Stadium	200
Thunderbirds Ladies	Gqeberha	Sisa Dukashe Stadium	17,000
TUT ladies	Pretoria	TUT Stadium	2,500
Tsunami Queens	Bethlehem	Goble Park Stadium	5,000
UJ Ladies	Johannesburg	UJ Soweto Stadium	8,000
UWC Ladies	Cape Town	UWC Stadium	2,500

== Table ==
As of 27 March 2024

Pos	Team	Pld	W	D	L	GF	GA	GD	Pts	Qualification or relegation
1	Mamelodi Sundowns Ladies (C)	22	21	1	0	83	13	+70	64	Champions League
2	TUT Ladies	22	17	4	1	83	26	+57	55	
3	Bloemfontein Celtic Ladies	22	13	5	4	55	25	+30	44	
4	First Touch	22	10	6	6	54	44	+10	36	
5	Coal City Wizards	22	8	8	6	38	38	0	32	
6	UWC Ladies	22	7	9	6	46	27	+19	30	
7	Durban Ladies	22	8	2	12	32	52	−20	26	
8	UJ Ladies	22	8	2	12	35	57	−22	26	
9	Golden Ladies	22	4	5	13	25	45	−20	17	
10	Thunderbirds Ladies	22	4	4	14	29	63	−34	16	
11	Richmond United	22	4	2	16	24	69	−45	14	
12	Tsunami Queens	22	2	4	16	21	66	−45	10	

(C) Champion

== Results ==
The teams played 21 games each. The final game, which was due to be contested from 21-29 March 2020, was adjusted a 1-1* draw due to the COVID-19 pandemic in South Africa which resulted in travel restrictions being enforced from 18 March 2020.

Home \ Away	BCL	CCW	DBN	FT	GDL	MSD	RMU	TBL	TUT	TQ	UJ	UWC
Bloemfontein Celtics Ladies		5–0	2–1	1–3	3–2	0–1	1–1	4–2	0–2	3–0	6–1	0–0
Coal City Wizards	1–1*		1–1	2–2	3–2	1–4	3–2	3–0	0–2	2–1	2–0	2–2
Durban Ladies	0–6	2–1		3–2	3–2	0–3	3–1	4–1	1–6	0–1	1–2	0–5
First Touch	2–2	2–2	4–1		4–0	2–3	6–1	4–1	2–4	3–1	2–4	2–1
Golden Ladies	0–2	0–0	0–1	1–1		1–4	4–2	4–1	1–8	2–0	0–1	1–4
Mamelodi Sundowns Ladies	3–0	4–1	3–1	11–1	3–1		7–0	6–0	2–1	8–0	3–2	3–0
Richmond United	2–5	0–1	2–3	1–5	0–1	0–1		3–2	0–8	1–1*	0–3	1–8
Thunderbirds Ladies	0–4	4–3	1–1	0–2	1–1	0–6	2–3		1–2	3–1	2–3	0–0
TUT Ladies	1–1	2–2	3–2	3–1	2–1	1–1*	2–0	5–2		7–2	3–2	2–2
Tsunami Queens	0–3	0–5	1–0	0–2	0–0	1–2	1–2	3–4	1–6		3–3	0–5
UJ Ladies	3–4	1–2	3–4	1–1*	1–0	0–3	2–1	0–1	0–10	2–1		0–2
UWC Ladies	0–2	1–1*	2–0	1–1	1–1	0–2	0–1	1–1	2–3	3–3	6–1	

Updated to match(es) played on 16 March 2024. Source:
Legend: Blue = home team win; Yellow = draw; Red = away team win.

== Awards ==
The following players were rated best in the season.

Award	Player	Club
Player of the Season	(South Africa) Hildah Magaia	TUT Ladies
Top scorer	(South Africa) Hildah Magaia	TUT Ladies
Top scorer	(South Africa) Rhoda Mulaudzi	Mamelodi Sundowns Ladies
Young Player of the Season	(South Africa) Kananelo Taiwe	Bloemfontein Celtic Ladies
Goalkeeper of the Season	(South Africa) Andile Dlamini	Mamelodi Sundowns Ladies

Mulaudzi was subsequently crowned the South African Football Journalists’ Association’s (Safja) Women’s Footballer of the Year.
