= 2025 Sasol League National Championship =

Tournament details
- Country: South Africa
- City: Vanderbijlpark
- Venue: Vaal University of Technology
- Date: 9 - 14 December 2025
- Teams: 8

Final positions
- Champions: Diepkloof Ladies
- Runners-up: Ramatlaohle Ladies
- Semifinalists: Ixias Ladies; Super Strikers Ladies

Tournament statistics
- Top goal scorer: Mavis Maiacane

Awards
- Best player: Refilwe Moyo
- Best goalkeeper: Mananki Makhoana

The 2025 Sasol League National Championship was 16th edition of Sasol League National Championship since it was formed in 2009. It will be held at the Vaal University of Technology in Vanderbijlpark.

Ezemvelo were defending champions having won the 2024 edition. Gauteng's Diepkloof Ladies defeated Limpopo's Ramatlaohle Ladies by a single goal to win the final.

== Participating teams ==
| Team | Provincial League |
| 4800 Ladies | Eastern Cape Sasol League |
| Ixias Ladies | Free State Sasol League |
| Diepkloof Ladies | Gauteng Sasol League |
| All Stars | KwaZulu Natal Sasol League |
| Ramatlaohle Ladies | Limpopo Sasol League |
| Super Strikers Ladies | Mpumalanga Sasol League |
| Royal Wizards | Northern Cape Sasol League |
| No participant | North West Sasol League |
| Stellenbosch Women's F.C. | Western Cape Sasol League |

== Draw ==
| Group A | Group B |
|---|---|
| Ramatlaohle Ladies; Diepkloof Ladies; Stellenbosch Women's F.C.; Royal Wizards | Super Strikers Ladies; Ixias Ladies; All Stars; 4800 Ladies |

== Group stages ==
Tiebreakers

Teams are ranked according to points (3 points for a win, 1 point for a draw, 0 points for a loss), and if tied on points, the following tiebreaking criteria are applied, in the order given, to determine the rankings.

1. Points in head-to-head matches among tied teams;
2. Goal difference in head-to-head matches among tied teams;
3. Goals scored in head-to-head matches among tied teams;
4. If more than two teams are tied, and after applying all head-to-head criteria above, a subset of teams are still tied, all head-to-head criteria above are reapplied exclusively to this subset of teams;
5. Goal difference in all group matches;
6. Goals scored in all group matches;
7. Penalty shoot-out if only two teams are tied and they met in the last round of the group;
8. Disciplinary points (yellow card = 1 point, red card as a result of two yellow cards = 3 points, direct red card = 3 points, yellow card followed by direct red card = 4 points);
9. Drawing of lots.

=== Group A ===
| Pos | Team | Pld | W | D | L | GF | GA | GD | Pts | Qualification |
|---|---|---|---|---|---|---|---|---|---|---|
| 1 | Ramatlaohle Ladies | 2 | 2 | 0 | 0 | 4 | 1 | +3 | 6 | Knockout Stages |
| 2 | Diepkloof Ladies | 2 | 1 | 0 | 1 | 12 | 4 | +8 | 3 | |
| 3 | Stellenbosch Women's F.C. | 0 | 0 | 0 | 0 | 0 | 0 | 0 | 0 | |
| 4 | RC Raycon Ladies | 2 | 0 | 0 | 2 | 3 | 14 | −11 | 0 | |

9 December
10:30

| Diepkloof Ladies | 0–2 | Ramatlaohle Ladies |

9 December
16:00

| Royal Wizards | 1–2 | Ramatlaohle Ladies |

10 December
13:00

| Royal Wizards | 2–12 | Diepkloof Ladies |

=== Group B ===
| Pos | Team | Pld | W | D | L | GF | GA | GD | Pts | Qualification |
|---|---|---|---|---|---|---|---|---|---|---|
| 1 | Super Strikers Ladies | 3 | 3 | 0 | 0 | 11 | 2 | +9 | 9 | Knockout Stages |
| 2 | Ixias Ladies | 3 | 1 | 1 | 1 | 4 | 5 | −1 | 4 | |
| 3 | 4800 Ladies | 3 | 1 | 0 | 2 | 2 | 8 | −6 | 3 | |
| 4 | All Stars | 3 | 0 | 1 | 2 | 2 | 4 | −2 | 1 | |

9 December
13:00

| All Stars | 1–2 | Super Strikers Ladies |

9 December
13:00

| 4800 Ladies | 1–2 | Ixias Ladies |

10 December
10:30

| Ixias Ladies | 1–3 | Super Strikers Ladies |

10 December
10:30

| 4800 Ladies | 1–0 | All Stars |

10 December
16:00

| Ixias Ladies | 1–1 | All Stars |

10 December
16:00

| 4800 Ladies | 0–6 | Super Strikers Ladies |

== Knockouts ==
=== Bracket ===
Semi-finals
12 December – Vaal University of Technology
Ramatlaohle Ladies | 3
Ixias Ladies | 0
12 December– Vaal University of Technology
Super Strikers Ladies | 0
Diepkloof Ladies | 0 (2–3 p)

Final
14 December –Vaal University of Technology
Ramatlaohle Ladies | 0
Diepkloof Ladies | 1

=== Semi-finals ===
12 December
12:00

| Ramatlaohle Ladies | 3–0 | Ixias Ladies |

28 March 2024

| Super Strikers Ladies | 0–0 | Diepkloof Ladies |
Penalties
| | 2-3 |

Vaal University of Technology

=== Final ===
14 December
12:00

| Ramatlaohle Ladies | 0–1 | Diepkloof Ladies |

== Awards ==
The following were rated best in the tournament:

| Award | Winner | Club |
|---|---|---|
| Best Player | Refilwe Moyo | Ramatlaohle Ladies |
| Best goalkeeper | Mananki Makhoana | Diepkloof Ladies |
| Top goalscorer | Mavis Maiacane | Super Strikers Ladies |
| Referee of the Tournament | Hloniphile Msezane | |
| Assistant Referee of the Tournament | Nolitha Mhlomi | |
