= 2022 SAFA Women's League =

2022 Women's Football league season

SAFA Women's League
- Season: 2022
- Dates: 23 April 2022 - 26 November 2022
- Champions: Mamelodi Sundowns Ladies (5th title)
- Promoted: University of Pretoria; Copperbelt Ladies
- Relegated: Tsunami Queens; Golden Ladies
- 2023 COSAFA Women's Champions League: Mamelodi Sundowns
- Matches: 240
- Goals: 689 (2.87 per match)
- Best Player: Boitumelo Rabale
- Top goalscorer: Nompumelelo Nyandeni (30 goals)
- Best goalkeeper: Katlego Moletsane
- All statistics correct as of 20 October 2023.

The 2022 SAFA Women's League was the 3rd season of the fully-professional SAFA Women's League, and the 14th season of nation-wide league competition in women's club football in South Africa.

== Teams ==
=== Team changes ===
Joining the 14 teams from the 2021 competition were two squads promoted from the Provincial league: Vasco Da Gama (since renamed to the TS Galaxy Queens), and City Lads. No teams were relegated after the previous season, per the expansion plan announced at league launch in 2019, however, relegation would commence with the end of this season.

=== Stadiums and locations ===
Location of teams in 2022 SAFA WOMEN'S LEAGUE

Team	Location	Stadium	Capacity
Bloemfontein Celtic	Bloemfontein	Siwelele Park Stadium	1,000
City Lads	East London	Isaac Wolfson Stadium	10,000
Coal City Wizards	Johannesburg	Puma Stadium	24,000
Durban Ladies	Durban	Sugar Ray Xulu Stadium	6,500
First Touch F.C.	Polokwane	Baroka village	1,000
Golden Ladies	Johannesburg	Montshioa Stadium	
JVW FC	Johannesburg	Wits Stadium	5,000
Ma-Indies Ladies	Polokwane	Giyani Stadium	20,000
Mamelodi Sundowns Ladies	Pretoria	Loftus versfeid stadium	51,762
Richmond United	Northern Cape	Merino Park Stadium	200
Thunderbirds Ladies	Gqeberha	Sisa Dukashe Stadium	17,000
TUT	Pretoria	TUT Stadium	2,500
UJ	Johannesburg	UJ Stadium	8,000
UWC	Cape Town	UWC Stadium	2,500
Vasco Da Gama	Cape Town	Parow Park Stadium	2,000

== Table ==
As of 20 October 2023

Pos	Team	Pld	W	D	L	GF	GA	GD	Pts	Qualification or relegation
1	Mamelodi Sundowns Ladies (C)	30	27	1	2	126	13	+113	82	Champions League Qualifiers
2	UWC Ladies	30	20	8	2	55	13	+42	68	
3	TUT Ladies	30	19	8	3	75	33	+42	65	
4	JVW	30	19	3	8	82	33	+49	60	
5	UJ Ladies	30	15	6	9	59	41	+18	51	
6	Bloem Celtic Ladies	30	13	12	5	37	22	+15	51	
7	Richmond United	30	15	3	12	63	51	+12	48	
8	Ma-Indies Ladies	30	14	5	11	42	45	−3	47	
9	First Touch	30	10	8	12	28	48	−20	38	
10	Durban Ladies	30	11	4	15	32	45	−13	37	
11	Thunderbirds Ladies	30	10	5	15	40	50	−10	35	
12	City Lads	30	8	5	17	36	75	−39	29	
13	Coal City Wizards	30	7	2	21	34	63	−29	23	
14	Vasco da Gama	30	6	4	20	31	66	−35	22	
15	Golden Ladies (R)	30	3	4	23	27	107	−80	13	Play-offs
16	Tsunami Queens (R)	30	2	4	24	15	77	−62	10	Relegation

Source: Hollywoodbets Super League 2022

(C) Champion; (P/O) Play-offs; (R) Relegated

== Awards ==
The awards are also sponsored by Hollywoodbets and were held at the end of the season.

Award	Winner	Club
Goalkeeper of the Season	Katlego Moletsane	Bloemfontein Celtics Ladies
Player of the Season	Boitumelo Rabale	Mamelodi Sundowns Ladies
Coach of the Season	Jerry Tshabalala	Mamelodi Sundowns Ladies
Top goalscorer	Andisiwe Mgcoyi	Mamelodi Sundowns Ladies
Top goalscorer	Nompumelelo Nyandeni	JVW
Young Player of the Season	Nthabiseng Majiya	Richmond United
Referee of the Season	Hloniphile Msizane	
Assistant of Referee of the Season	Amogelang Msiza	

Nompumelelo Nyandeni claimed her second top goal scorer award and was crowned the South African Football Journalists’ Association's (Safja) Women's Footballer of the Year.

== See also ==
- 2022-23 South African Premier Division
