= Noko Matlou =

South African soccer player (born 1985)

Personal information
- Full name: Noko Alice Matlou
- Date of birth: 30 September 1985 (age 41)
- Place of birth: Moletjie, South Africa
- Height: 1.72 m (5 ft 8 in)
- Positions: Striker; defender

Team information
- Current team: Ramatlaohle

Senior career*
Years	Team	Apps	(Gls)
–	Development Ladies		
–	Brazilian Ladies		
2013–	University of Johannesburg		
–2019	Ma-Indies Ladies		
2021–2024	Eibar	40	(0)
2024–2026	CP Cacereño	0	(0)
2026–	Ramatlaohle	0	(0)

International career^{‡}
2006–2025	South Africa	174	(66)
Medal record
Representing South Africa
Women's Africa Cup of Nations
Second place	2008 Equatorial Guinea
Third place	2010 South Africa
Second place	2012 Equatorial Guinea
Second place	2018 Ghana
First place	2022 Morocco
- * Club domestic league appearances and goals as of 15 May 2022 ‡ National team caps and goals as of 5 April 2025

Noko Alice Matlou (born 30 September 1985) is a South African professional soccer player who plays as a defender for Ramatlaohle. She has played for the South Africa women's national team both as a striker and a defender.

In 2008, Matlou became the first South African to receive a CAF award when she was named African Women's Footballer of the Year.

Matlou has represented the South Africa women's national football team 174 times, including at the 2012, 2016 Summer Olympics and the 2019, and 2023 FIFA Women's World Cups. She is the second most capped African player.

== Club career ==
At a club level, she played for Ma-Indies Ladies. She has previously played for Development Ladies, Brazilian Ladies and the University of Johannesburg. Within footballing circles, she is nicknamed "Beep-Beep".

In 2008, she became the first South African to be named African Women's Footballer of the Year by the Confederation of African Football.

=== CP Cacereño Femenino ===
In August 2024, she signed a 1-year contract with Primera Federación side CP Cacereño Femenino.

== International career ==
Matlou made her debut for South Africa women's national football team ("Banyana Banyana") in December 2006. In September 2009, Matlou was subjected to a gender "inspection" by a referee in the presence of the opposition captain, before South Africa's match against Ghana at Caledonian Stadium, Pretoria. She was allowed to play in the match after being confirmed as female.

Matlou came to prominence within the national team by scoring six goals at the 2008 African Women's Championship. She has been selected for the squads for a variety of tournaments, including at the 2012 Summer Olympics in London, United Kingdom. In 2014, South Africa's coach Vera Pauw deployed Matlou—previously a striker, as a defender.

In March 2025 she announced her retirement from international football after the April international break. Her last match would be against Malawi. Matlou captained Banyana Banyana on her 174th cap in a 3-0 win over Malawi at UJ Soweto campus on 5 April 2025. She is the second most capped African player behind Janine van Wyk (185 caps).

No.	Date	Venue	Opponent	Score	Result	Competition
1.	23 February 2008	Harare, Zimbabwe	Zimbabwe	3–1	4–1	2008 African Women's Championship qualification
2.	23 February 2008	Harare, Zimbabwe	Zimbabwe	4–1	4–1	2008 African Women's Championship qualification
3.	16 November 2008	Estadio La Libertad, Bata, Equatorial Guinea	Tunisia	1–?	2–1	2008 African Women's Championship
4.	25 November 2008	Estadio Internacional, Malabo, Equatorial Guinea	Cameroon	1–0	3–0	2008 African Women's Championship
5.	25 November 2008	Estadio Internacional, Malabo, Equatorial Guinea	Cameroon	2–0	3–0	2008 African Women's Championship
6.	25 November 2008	Estadio Internacional, Malabo, Equatorial Guinea	Cameroon	3–0	3–0	2008 African Women's Championship
7.	29 November 2008	Estadio Internacional, Malabo, Equatorial Guinea	Equatorial Guinea	1–1	1–2	2008 African Women's Championship
8.	7 March 2009	GSP Stadium, Nicosia, Cyprus	Scotland	1–0	2–0	2009 Cyprus Women's Cup
9.	10 March 2009	Makario Stadium, Nicosia, Cyprus	France	1–3	2–3	2009 Cyprus Women's Cup
10.	15 July 2009	Olympisch Stadion, Amsterdam, Netherlands	Switzerland	2–0	3–2	Friendly
11.	1 March 2010	GSZ Stadium, Larnaca, Cyprus	Canada	1–0	1–2	2010 Cyprus Women's Cup
12.	3 March 2010	GSZ Stadium, Larnaca, Cyprus	Scotland	1–0	1–2	2010 Cyprus Women's Cup
13.	2 April 2011	King Zwelithini Stadium, Umlazi, South Africa	Tunisia	1–0	1–0	2012 CAF Women's Olympic qualifying tournament
14.	3 July 2011	Gwanzura, Harare, Zimbabwe	Botswana	2–0	4–0	2011 COSAFA Women's Championship
15.	6 July 2011	Gwanzura, Harare, Zimbabwe	Malawi	5–1	5–1	2011 COSAFA Women's Championship
16.	27 August 2011	Orlando Stadium, Soweto, South Africa	Ethiopia	1–0	3–0	2012 CAF Women's Olympic qualifying tournament
17.	27 August 2011	Orlando Stadium, Soweto, South Africa	Ethiopia	2–0	3–0	2012 CAF Women's Olympic qualifying tournament
18.	27 August 2011	Orlando Stadium, Soweto, South Africa	Ethiopia	3–0	3–0	2012 CAF Women's Olympic qualifying tournament
19.	26 May 2012	Nkoloma Stadium, Lusaka, Zambia	Zambia	1–0	4–1	2012 African Women's Championship qualification
20.	11 April 2015	Dobsonville Stadium, Johannesburg, South Africa	Botswana	4–0	5–0	2015 African Games
21.	7 March 2018	GSZ Stadium, Larnaca, Cyprus	Belgium	1–0	1–2	2018 Cyprus Women's Cup

== Honours ==
South Africa

- Women's Africa Cup of Nations: 2022, runners-up: 2008, 2012, 2018; third place: 2010

Individual

- African Women's Footballer of the Year: 2008
