= Silindile Ngubane =

South African soccer player (born 1987)

Personal information
- Full name: Silindile Precious Ngubane
- Date of birth: 27 February 1987 (age 39)
- Place of birth: Mpophomeni, South Africa
- Position: Striker

Team information
- Current team: Ezemvelo

Senior career*
Years	Team	Apps	(Gls)
- Howick Banyana
- Dambuza Young Stars
- Durban Ladies
2023-	Ezemvelo		

International career^{‡}
2012–	South Africa	34	(7)
- * Club domestic league appearances and goals ‡ National team caps and goals as of 11 October 2014

Silindile Precious “Mshana” Ngubane (born 27 February 1987) is a South African soccer player who plays as a striker for Ezemvelo and the South Africa women's national team.

== Playing career ==
=== International ===
In October 2012, Ngubane was named to the senior team roster in preparation for the 2012 African Women's Championship in Equatorial Guinea.

In September 2014, Ngubane was named to the senior team roster in preparation for the 2014 African Women's Championship in Namibia.
