= Richmond United F.C. =

Women's football club in South Africa

- Full name: Richmond United Football Club
- Founded: 2013; 13 years ago
- League: SAFA Women's League
- 2025: 12th

Richmond United Football Club is a women's soccer club based in De Aar, Northern Cape. The team competes in the SAFA Women's League, the top tier women's football league in South Africa.

== History ==
They were founded in 2013 by Amichad Amsterdam.

In 2018, they won the Northern Cape Sasol Women's League. They participated in the Sasol League National Championship where they finished last overall (9th place).

In 2020, they were granted entry to the inaugural SAFA Women's League.

== Honours ==
- Northern Cape Sasol Women's League: 2018

== Team statistics ==
=== SAFA Women's League record ===
Season	Pos	Record							
Season	Pos	P	W	D	L	F	A	GD	Pst
2019-20	11th	22	4	2	16	24	69	(45)	14
2021	11th	26	7	5	14	44	60	(16)	26
2022	7th	30	15	3	12	63	51	12	48
2023	7th	30	13	9	8	48	42	6	48
2024	10th	30	9	9	12	42	50	(8)	36
2025	12th	30	9	5	16	33	50	(17)	32

- Orange = In progress
- Gold = Champions
- Silver = Runner up

==== SAFA Women's League statistics ====
- Record number of games won in a season: 15 games (2022)
- Record number of points in a season: 48 points (2022, 2023)
- Record goals scored in a season: 63 goals (2022)
- Record for lowest number of goals conceded in a season: 42 goals (2023)
- Record for lowest number of defeats in a season: 8 games (2023)
