= Copperbelt Ladies F.C. =

- Full name: Copperbelt Ladies Football Club
- Founded: 2019; 7 years ago
- Ground: Seshego Stadium
- Coordinates: 23.8554°S 29.38885°E
- Chairman: Strause Maleaka
- Head Coach: (South Africa) Karabo Selabe
- League: SAFA Women's League
- 2025: 8th

Copperbelt Ladies F.C. is a women's soccer club based in Polokwane, Limpopo. The team competes in the SAFA Women's League, the top tier women's football league in South Africa.

They won the 2022 Sasol League National Championship and became the first team from the Limpopo province to win the national championship.

== History ==
=== Sasol Women's League ===
In 2022, they won the 2022 Sasol League National Championship by defeating the University of Pretoria 3–2 on penalties. The win granted them promotion to the 2023 Hollywoodbets Super League were they finished 12th in their maiden season.

=== SAFA Women's League ===
They made their debut in the 2023 season and finished in 12th place.

They had their best start in the 2024 season going unbeaten in 6 games, 3 wins and 3 draws, but ended the season in 12th place again.

They started the 2025 season with 2 wins.

== Honours ==
- Sasol League National Championship: 2022
- Limpopo Sasol Women's League: 2022

== Team statistics ==
=== SAFA Women's League record ===
Season	Pos	Record							
Season	Pos	P	W	D	L	F	A	GD	Pst
2023	12th place	30	7	5	18	26	58	(32)	26
2024	12th place	30	7	8	15	30	41	(11)	29
2025	8th place	30	10	10	10	36	33	(3)	40

- Orange = In progress
- Gold = Champions
- Silver = Runner up

==== SAFA Women's League statistics ====
- Record number of games won in a season: 10 games (2025)
- Record number of points in a season: 40 points (2025)
- Record goals scored in a season: 35 goals (2025)
- Record for lowest number of goals conceded in a season: 33 goals (2025)
- Record for lowest number of defeats in a season: 10 games (2025)
