= 2018 Sasol League National Championship =

Tournament details
- Country: South Africa
- City: Kimberly
- Venue: Galeshewe Stadium
- Dates: 4 December 2018 - 9 December 2018
- Teams: 9

Final positions
- Champions: TUT Ladies (1st title)
- Runners-up: Durban Ladies
- Third place: UWC Ladies
- Fourth place: First Touch

Tournament statistics
- Top goal scorer(s): Sthembile Shange Silindile Ngubane; Molatelo Koba; Kgalebane Mohlakoana 3 goals each

Awards
- Best player: Hildah Magaia
- Best young player: Matome Taiwe
- Best goalkeeper: Victoria Muroa

The 2018 Sasol League National Championship was the 10th edition of the Sasol League National Championship since it was formed in 2009. It was held at Galeshewe Stadium in Kimberly.

Bloemfontein Celtics Ladies were defending champions after successfully defending their title from 2016. They failed to reach the semi-finals of this year's edition which meant a new champion would be crowned. Debutants TUT Ladies defeated Durban Ladies 4-0 in the final to be crowned champions.

== Participating teams ==
All nine teams qualified through winning their provincial leagues.

Team	Provincial League
Thunderbirds Ladies	Eastern Cape Sasol League
Bloemfontein Celtics Ladies	Free State Sasol League
TUT Ladies	Gauteng Sasol League
Durban Ladies	KwaZulu Natal Sasol League
First Touch	Limpopo Sasol League
Coal City Wizards	Mpumalanga Sasol League
Richmond United	Northern Cape Sasol League
Golden Ladies	North West Sasol League
UWC Ladies	Western Cape Sasol League

== Knockout stages ==
=== 3rd/4th play off ===
9 December 2018

UWC Ladies	0–0	First Touch
Penalties
	4-3

Galeshewe Stadium

=== Final ===
9 December 2018

TUT Ladies	4–0	Durban Ladies
32' Tlailane 37' Magaia 77' 88' Madiba

Galeshewe Stadium, Kimberly

== Final standings ==
Rank	Team	Prize money
1	TUT Ladies	R200 000
2	Durban Ladies	R100 000
3	UWC Ladies	R60 000
4	First Touch	R40 000
5	Bloemfontein Celtics Ladies	R30 000
6	Thunderbirds Ladies	R25 000
7	Coal City Wizards	R20 000
8	Golden Ladies	R15 000
9	Richmond United	R10 000

== Awards ==
The following were rated best in the tournament:

Award	Winner	Club
Diski Queen of the Tournament	Hildah Magaia	TUT Ladies
Coach of the Tournament	Tebogo Mokae	TUT Ladies
Queen of Queens of the Tournament	Bongeka Gamede	UWC Ladies
Best goalkeeper	Victoria Muroa	First Touch
Young Queen of the Tournament	Matome Taiwe	Bloemfontein Celtics Ladies
Top goalscorer of the Tournament	Silindile Ngubane	Durban Ladies
Top goalscorer of the Tournament	Sthembile Shange	Durban Ladies
Top goalscorer of the Tournament	Molatelo Koba	UWC Ladies
Top goalscorer of the Tournament	Kgalebane Mohlakoana	Bloemfontein Celtics Ladies
Referee of the Tournament	Lindiwe Thwala	
