= First Touch F.C. =

Women's football club in South Africa

- Full name: First Touch Football Club
- Nickname: Dikgoshigadi tsa Limpopo
- Founded: 2018; 8 years ago
- Stadium: Baroka Village
- Capacity: 1000
- Coordinates: 24.2868°S 29.5482°E
- Owner: Rulani Mathebula
- Head Coach: (South Africa) Mmowa Kekana
- League: SAFA Women's League
- 2025: 14th

First Touch Football Club, also First Touch Academy, is a women's soccer club based in Polokwane, Limpopo. The team competes in the SAFA Women's League, the top tier women's football league in South Africa.

== History ==
Founded in 2018 by Rulani Mathebula, they won the 2018 Limpopo Sasol League in their maiden season and qualified for the 2018 Sasol League National Championship were they finished fourth also.

In 2021 they partnered with Selaki Sport Leisure.

== Honours ==
- Limpopo Sasol League: 2018

== Team statistics ==
=== SAFA Women's League record ===
Season	Pos	Record							
Season	Pos	P	W	D	L	F	A	GD	Pst
2019-20	Fourth place	22	10	6	6	54	44	10	36
2021	5th place	26	10	10	6	42	35	(7)	40
2022	9th place	30	10	8	12	28	48	(20)	38
2023	11th place	30	8	7	15	30	51	(21)	31
2024	6th place	30	13	5	12	39	50	(11)	44
2025	14th place	30	5	8	17	20	46	(26)	23

- Orange = In progress
- Gold = Champions
- Silver = Runner up

==== SAFA Women's League statistics ====
- Record number of games won in a season: 13 games (2024)
- Record number of points in a season: 44 points (2024)
- Record goals scored in a season: 54 goals (2019-20)
- Record for lowest number of goals conceded in a season: 35 goals (2021)
- Record for lowest number of defeats in a season: 6 games (2019-20, 2021)
