= Thunderbirds Ladies F.C. =

South African women's football club

- Full name: Thunderbirds Ladies Football Club
- Nickname: The Birds
- Founded: 2004; 21 years ago
- Ground: Sisa Dukashe Stadium
- Capacity: 17 000
- Coordinates: 32.9469° S, 27.7601° E
- Head coach: (South Africa) Phumlani Matshobeni
- League: SAFA Women's League
- 2024: 16th (relegated)

Thunderbirds Ladies F.C. is a women's soccer club based in Butterworth, Eastern Cape. The team was relegated from the 2024 SAFA Women's League, the top tier women's football league in South Africa.

== History ==
In 2017, they won their first Eastern Cape Sasol League which qualified them to the 2017 Sasol League National Championship where they placed third overall.

The club defended their Eastern Cape Sasol League title in 2018 and competed in the 2018 Sasol League National Championship were they placed sixth overall.

In the 2023 season, the team avoided relegation by finishing 14th in the log with only 3 points separating them and 15th placed Coal City Wizards. The team managed 5 wins, 5 draws, and 20 losses.

The club recorded the worst start to the SAFA Women's League in the 2024 season with 10 defeats in a row conceding 39 goals and only scoring 4 in 10 matches. In September after a 6–0 loss to UWC Ladies, they were officially relegated after 5 seasons in the top flight.

== Technical team ==
As of July 2024

Position	Staff
Head Coach	Phumlani Matshobeni
Team Manager	Gugulethu Diko

== Team statistics ==
=== SAFA Women's League record ===
Season	Pos	Record							
Season	Pos	P	W	D	L	F	A	GD	Pst
2019-20	10th place	22	4	4	14	29	63	(34)	16
2021	7th place	26	10	5	11	29	40	(11)	35
2022	11th place	30	10	5	15	40	50	(10)	35
2023	14th place	30	5	5	20	22	59	(37)	20
2024	16th place	25	0	3	23	12	100	(88)	3

- Gold = Champions
- Red = Relegated

== Honours ==
- Eastern Cape Sasol League: 2017, 2018
- Sasol League National Championship: Third: 2017
