= Solomon Mahlangu Stadium =

Stadium in KwaMhlanga, South Africa

- Interactive map of Solomon Mahlangu Stadium
- Location: KwaMhlanga, Mpumalanga, South Africa
- Coordinates: 25.4300°S 28.7147°E
- Capacity: 15,000

Construction
- Renovated: 2021

Tenant
- Casric Stars

Solomon Mahlangu Stadium is a sports stadium in KwaMhlanga, Mpumalanga, South Africa, used primarily for soccer matches.

It is named after the anti-apartheid activist Solomon Mahlangu.

The stadium was renovated for the 2010 FIFA World Cup, but fell into disrepair after. It was renovated in 2021, and briefly closed for maintenance in 2024, and is currently the home stadium of National First Division club Casric Stars.

It is the preferred stadium of Premiership club TS Galaxy but does not meet Premiership standards.

== History ==
The stadium hosted Witbank Black Aces in the National Soccer League era.
