= Durban Ladies F.C. =

Durban Ladies
- Full name: Durban Ladies Football Club
- Founded: 1990; 36 years ago (as Umlazi Fast Eagles)
- Ground: Sugar Ray Xulu Stadium
- Capacity: 6500
- Coordinates: 29°48′06″S 30°53′46″E
- Founder: Mary-Jane Nomthandazo Sokhela
- Head Coach: (South Africa) Sphephelo Makhaye
- League: SAFA Women's League
- 2025: 16th

Durban Ladies Football Club is a women's soccer club based in Umlazi, Kwa-Zulu Natal. The team competes in the Sasol Women's League, the second tier women's football league in South Africa.

== History ==
Durban Ladies W.F.C. Logo till 2025

This club founded by Mary–Jane Sokhela in 1990. The club was founded under the name Umlazi Fast Eagles. In 1997 the team was sponsored by Spar and AmaZulu and later changed the club's name to Spar AmaZulu Ladies F.C. In 1999, it was changed again to Durban Ladies F.C.

In 2018 they won the KZN Sasol League and qualified for the 2018 Sasol League National Championship were they finished as runners-ups. This gained them a spot in SAFA Women's League that started in August 2019 where they finished in seventh.

In 2025 after six seasons in the top flight, Durban Ladies were relegated after finishing in last position in the league.

== U/20 ==
The U/20 side successfully defended their Engen Knockout Challenge title in 2024. In September they were runners up for the Engen Champ of Champs losing 1–0 to Gauteng's Mamelodi Sundowns Ladies.

== Players ==
As of October 2026

Note: Flags indicate national team as defined under FIFA eligibility rules; some limited exceptions apply. Players may hold more than one non-FIFA nationality.

No.	Pos.	Nation	Player
—	GK	RSA	Anathi Njeje
—	GK	RSA	Nelisiwe Myira
—	GK	RSA	Ziphelele Masangwana
—	GK	RSA	Gift Kgosamang
—	DF	RSA	Nkamogeleng Tshoke
—	DF	RSA	Amahle Mtshali
—	DF	RSA	Ncamisile Mkhize
—	DF	RSA	Hlengiwe Ntshiza
—	DF	RSA	Charlotte Mshengu
—	DF	RSA	Nomfundo Mdunge
—	DF	RSA	Amahle Hlengwa
—	DF	RSA	Makheisara Molaba
—	MF	RSA	Ongeziwe Ndlangisa
—	MF	RSA	Memory Makhanya
—	MF	RSA	Boitumelo Mabojane

No.	Pos.	Nation	Player
—	MF	RSA	Kwezi Dlamini
—	MF	RSA	Winnie Legodu
—	FW	RSA	Tshepang Korobele
—		RSA	Omuhle Ngcobo
—		RSA	Siphesihle Madiya
—		RSA	Sinothiwe Jele
—		RSA	Luyanda Gudazi
—		RSA	Nomfundo Xulu
—		RSA	Michelle Mondo
—		RSA	Musa Mnisi
—		RSA	Claudia Williams
—		RSA	Nelisiwe Maphumulo
—		RSA	Abongile Cele
—		RSA	Andiswa Jele

=== Summer Olympics participants ===
List of players that were called up for the Summer Olympic Games while playing for Durban Ladies. In brackets, the tournament played:

- (South Africa) Zamandosi Cele (2012)

=== FIFA U-17 Women's World Cup ===
List of players that were called up for a FIFA U-17 Women's World Cup while playing for the academy. In brackets, the tournament played:

- Yenzokuhle Ngubane (2018)
- Sibulele Holweni (2018)
- Yolanda Nduli (2018)
- Sphumelele Shamase (2018)
- Thubelihle Shamase (2018)

=== Notable players ===
- Amanda Dlamini
- Silindile Ngubane
- Khwezi Khoza
- Okuhle Sithole

== Honours ==
- Sasol League National Championship runners-up: 2018

U/20

- Engen Champ of Champs runners-up: 2024, 2025
- KwaZulu-Natal Engen Knockout Challenge: 2023, 2024, 2025

== Team statistics ==
=== SAFA Women's League record ===
Season	Pos	Record							
Season	Pos	P	W	D	L	F	A	GD	Pst
2019-20	7th place	22	8	2	12	32	52	(20)	26
2021	10th place	26	6	8	12	36	44	(8)	26
2022	10th place	30	11	4	15	32	45	(13)	37
2023	8th place	30	14	2	14	53	53	0	44
2024	13th place	30	6	7	17	34	59	(25)	25
2025	16th place	30	2	7	21	26	73	(47)	13

- Orange = In progress
- Gold = Champions
- Silver = Runner up

==== SAFA Women's League statistics ====
- Record number of games won in a season: 14 games (2023)
- Record number of points in a season: 44 points (2023)
- Record goals scored in a season: 53 goals (2023)
- Record for lowest number of goals conceded in a season: 44 goals (2021)
- Record for lowest number of defeats in a season: 12 games (2019–20, 2021)

== See also ==
- SAFA Women's League
- Sasol Women's League
