= Mamelodi Sundowns Ladies F.C. =

- Full name: Mamelodi Sundowns Ladies Football Club
- Nicknames: The Brazilians; Banyana Ba Style; Masandawana; Downs; Ka bo Yellow
- Short name: Sundowns, MSFC, MSL
- Founded: 2009; 17 years ago
- Ground: Lucas Moripe Stadium
- Capacity: 28 900
- Coordinates: 25°46′33.31″S 28°4′22.33″E
- Owner: Patrice Motsepe
- Chairman: Tlhopie Motsepe
- Head coach: (South Africa) Godfrey Sapula
- League: SAFA Women's League
- 2025: 1st
- Website: www.sundownsfc.co.za
Home colours	Away colours

Mamelodi Sundowns Ladies Football Club is a women's professional soccer club based in Pretoria, South Africa. The team competes in the SAFA Women's League, the top tier women's football league in South Africa.

They are the most successful women's team in South Africa with eight titles and won the inaugural CAF Women's Champions League in 2021.

== History ==
The club was founded on 4 September 2009 by owner Patrice Motsepe as part of Sundowns' expansion into women's football and they participated in the inaugural SAFA Provincial Women's League.

=== Early national success and Jerry Tshabalala era (2013–2024) ===
Jerry Tshabalala became head coach in 2012, beginning the era that shaped the club’s identity and dominance. They announced themselves as a rising force in South African women’s football during the 2013 Sasol League National Championship, where they captured their maiden national title by defeating Limpopo’s Ma‑Indies Ladies 2–0 in the final held in Klerksdorp, marking the club’s first major national triumph.

Sundowns set the Sasol League National Championship goal‑scoring record in 2015 with a staggering 25–0 victory over Galeshewe Ladies in Sasolburg, a scoreline that still stands unmatched. They carried that momentum through the tournament and secured their second national championship, beating Cape Town Roses 5–0 in the final.

==== Transition to the SAFA National Women’s League (2019–2020) ====
With the launch of the SAFA National Women’s League (SNWL) in 2019, Sundowns Ladies entered the country’s first professional women’s league. They won the inaugural SNWL title, finishing the season unbeaten with 21 wins and 1 draw.

==== Domestic dominance (2021–2024) ====
Sundowns Ladies maintained consistent superiority in the SNWL, winning multiple consecutive league titles. In 2021, they secured another championship and qualified for regional competition. In 2022, they set a league record by scoring 126 goals, becoming the first team to surpass 100 goals in a single season. They continued their dominance through 2023 and 2024, regularly finishing with high goal tallies and maintaining one of the best defensive records in the league.

The team has been one of the most dominant teams in the COSAFA Women’s Champions League, consistently reaching the latter stages and twice winning the regional title. They won the inaugural 2021 COSAFA qualifiers, producing emphatic scorelines throughout the group stage before defeating Green Buffaloes in the semi‑final and Black Rhino Queens in the final to secure qualification for the first CAF Women’s Champions League. In 2022, they again topped their group but lost to Green Buffaloes on penalties in the final, though they still qualified automatically as defending African champions. Sundowns reclaimed the regional crown in 2023, sweeping through the group stage with three clean‑sheet victories and setting a record scoreline with an 8–0 victory over Olympic de Moroni. They also defeated Green Buffaloes and Double Action Ladies in the knockout rounds to earn another CAF Champions League berth.

On 13 August 2023, Mamelodi Sundowns Ladies defeated the University of Johannesburg 1–0 in the final of the inaugural Joburg Basadi Football Challenge.

==== Continental competition and CAF Champions League success (2021–2023) ====
Sundowns Ladies represented the COSAFA region in the inaugural CAF Women’s Champions League in 2021. They won the tournament, defeating Hasaacas Ladies of Ghana 2–0 in the final and completing the competition undefeated without conceding a goal. In 2022, they reached the final again but finished as runners‑up to AS FAR of Morocco. They reclaimed the continental title in 2023, defeating Sporting Casablanca 3–0 in the final and once again completing the tournament without conceding.

Their continental achievements earned them recognition as CAF Women’s Club of the Year in 2022 and 2023.

On 10 May 2024, it was announced that Mamelodi Sundowns Ladies had been invited to participate in the 2024 edition of The Women’s Cup, scheduled for August. On 15 August 2024, they played their opening match against Kansas City Current of the United States, losing 3–0. They were defeated 2–0 by Japan’s INAC Kobe in their second match of the tournament.

At the end of the 2022 season, Mamelodi Sundowns Ladies were ranked as the best women’s club in Africa by the IFFHS, earning 174 points. In 2023, the club retained its position as Africa’s top‑ranked women’s team for a second consecutive year, accumulating 238 points and finishing tied for 19th in the IFFHS Women’s Club World Ranking.

=== Godfrey Sapula era (2025–present) ===
In 2025 they appointed Godfrey Sapula as head coach. Their 2025 COSAFA Women's Champions League campaign began strongly with three group‑stage wins, but they were eliminated in the semi‑finals by ZESCO Ndola Girls. Across all editions, Sundowns Ladies established themselves as the benchmark club in the COSAFA region, combining high‑scoring performances with consistent progression to continental competition. They won their sixth consecutive league title on 20 November 2025 with two games to spare under new coach Sapula and won their third regional title in 2026 to qualify for the 2026 CAF Women's Champions League.

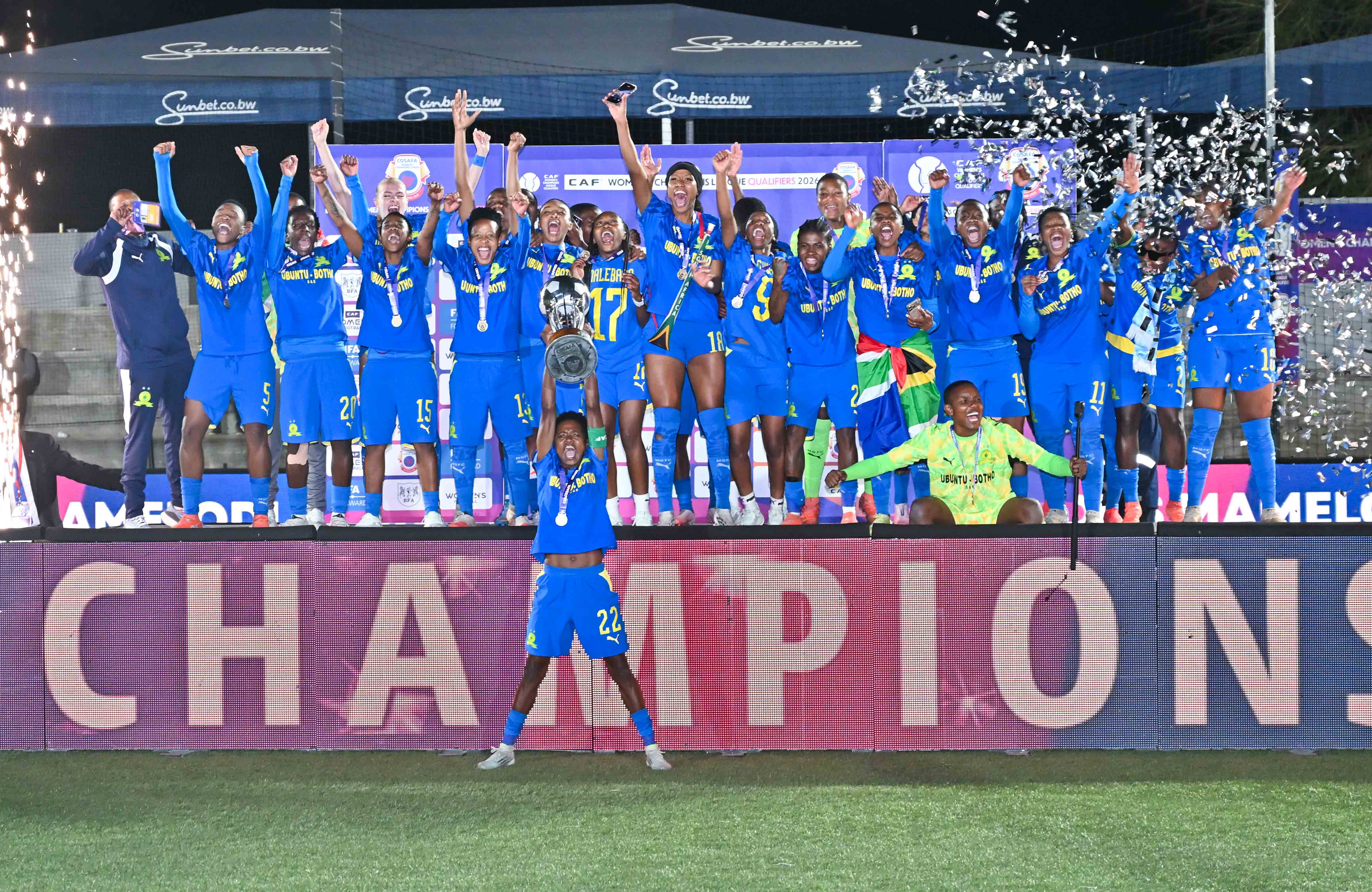
Sundowns Ladies celebrate winning the 2026 CAF Women's Champions League COSAFA Qualifiers in Gaborone, Botswana

== Media ==
Mamelodi Sundowns Ladies have been featured across several club‑produced and broadcast media platforms. In September 2021, the club launched the first edition of its quarterly Mamelodi Sundowns Magazine. The December 2021 issue, titled Banyana ba Style: Queens of the Continent, highlighted the team’s maiden CAF Women’s Champions League triumph and featured captain Zanele Nhlapho alongside Bambanani Mbane, Chuene Morifi, Thalea Smidt, and Andisiwe Mgcoyi on the cover.

Ahead of the 2022 CAF Women’s Champions League final, the club released a documentary titled Banyana Ba Style: The First Queens of African Football, which premiered on SuperSport channel 202 on 13 November 2022. In 2023, Netflix announced that the documentary would be available on its platform from 22 November.

On 7 April 2024, the club expanded its media presence with the launch of Sundowns Ladies TV, a weekly show broadcast on SABC 1 and hosted by sports presenter Bokamoso Jessica Nkomo (“Aunty Diski”).

== Players ==
As of December 2025

Mamelodi Sundowns Ladies F.C. squad for 2025 season.

Note: Flags indicate national team as defined under FIFA eligibility rules; some limited exceptions apply. Players may hold more than one non-FIFA nationality.

No.	Pos.	Nation	Player
1	GK	RSA	Mbali Ntimane
2	DF	RSA	Karabo Makhurubetshi (Vice Captain)
3	DF	RSA	Lebohang Ramalepe (Captain)
4	MF	RSA	Khunjulwa Mali
5	MF	RSA	Katleho Malebane
6	MF	RSA	Lehlogonolo Mashigo
7	FW	RSA	Ronnel Donnelly
8	FW	BOT	Refilwe Tholakele
9	FW	LES	Boitumelo Rabale
10	FW	RSA	Melinda Kgadiete
11	DF	RSA	Bambanani Mbane
12	DF	RSA	Oratile Mokwena
13	MF	RSA	Noxolo Cesane
14	DF	RSA	Tiisetso Letsoso

No.	Pos.	Nation	Player
15	FW	RSA	Lelona Daweti
16	DF	RSA	Khutso Pila
17	MF	RSA	Jabulile Mbatha
18	MF	RSA	Kholosa Biyana
19	MF	RSA	Nonhlanhla Mthandi
20	MF	RSA	Munashe Mugwara
21	DF	RSA	Karabo Dhlamini
22	GK	BOT	Sedilame Boseja
23	MF	RSA	Tiisetso Makhubela
24	GK	RSA	Andile Dlamini
25	MF	RSA	Isabella Ludwig
26	DF	RSA	Asanda Hadebe
27	FW	RSA	Nthabiseng Majiya

=== Technical team ===
Position	Staff
Head Coach	(South Africa) Godfrey Sapula
Assistant Coach	(South Africa) Agnes Nkosi
Goalkeeper Coach	(South Africa) Koketso Tshabalala
Head of Football	(South Africa) Christa Kgamphe-Jane
Team Doctor	(South Africa) Nokufa Makae
Kit Manager	(South Africa) Nokubonga Bala
Administrator	(South Africa) Dipuo Maboe

=== Coaching record ===
All-time Mamelodi Sundowns Ladies coaching records
Coach	Nat.	Tenure	Games	Win	Loss	Draw	Win %
Jerry Tshabalala	South Africa	January 2013 – December 2024					
Godfrey Sapula	South Africa	January 2025 – present (as of March 2026)	34	29	3	2	85.29

=== Kit suppliers and sponsors ===
Same sponsors as the men's team

Period	Kit manufacturer	Shirt sponsor	Sleeve sponsor
2014–2016	(United States) Nike	(South Africa) Ubuntu-Botho Investments	
2016–present	(Germany) Puma	(South Africa) Ubuntu-Botho Investments	(South Korea) Hyundai

=== Notable players ===
==== FIFA World Cup participants ====
List of players that were called up for a FIFA Women's World Cup while playing for Mamelodi Sundowns Ladies. In brackets, the tournament played:

- (South Africa) Tiisetso Makhubela (2019, 2023)
- (South Africa) Andile Dlamini (2019, 2023)
- (South Africa) Karabo Dhlamini (2019, 2023)
- (South Africa) Lebohang Ramalepe (2023)
- (South Africa) Melinda Kgadiete (2023)
- (South Africa) Bambanani Mbane (2023)

==== Summer Olympics participants ====
List of players that were called up for the Summer Olympic Games while playing for Mamelodi Sundowns Ladies. In brackets, the tournament played:

- (South Africa) Refiloe Jane (2012)
- (South Africa) Andisiwe Mgcoyi (2012)
- (South Africa) Sanah Mollo (2016)
- (South Africa) Andile Dlamini (2016)

== Honours ==
Type	Competition	Titles	Seasons
Domestic	SAFA Women's League/National Championship	8	Champions (8): 2013, 2015, 2019-20, 2021, 2022, 2023, 2024, 2025
Domestic	Gauteng Provincial League	3	Champions (3): 2013, 2015, 2017
Regional	COSAFA Women's Champions League	3	Champions (3): 2021, 2023, 2026 Runners-up (1): 2022
Continental	CAF Women's Champions League	2	Champions (2): 2021, 2023 Runners-up (2): 2022, 2026

- Record
- ^{S} Shared record

=== Awards ===
- CAF Club of the Year (Women): 2022, 2023
- CAF Women's Champions League Fair Play: 2023, 2026
- Gauteng Sports Awards: Team of the year: 2024
- GSports: Newsmaker of the Year: 2025

== Club records ==
Type	Nat	Name	Record
Most Trophies Won - Coach	(South Africa)	Jerry Tshabalala	12
League victory	(South Africa)	vs Thunderbirds Ladies	13–0 (2024 SAFA Women's League)
COSAFA victory	(Comoros)	vs Olympic de Moroni	8–0 (2023 COSAFA Women's Champions League)
COSAFA victory	(Eswatini)	vs Nsingizini Hotspurs	8–0 (2026 COSAFA Women's Champions League)
Record victory	(South Africa)	vs Galeshewe Ladies	25–0 (2015 Sasol League National Championship)
CAF victory	(Egypt)	vs Wadi Degla	5–0 (2022 CAF Women's Champions League)
Record defeat	(Morocco)	vs AS FAR	4–0 (2022 CAF Women's Champions League)

=== CAF Women's Champions League record ===
Season	Pos	Record						
Season	Pos	P	W	D	L	F	A	GD
2021	Champions	5	3	2	0	4	0	4
2022	Runners up	5	4	0	1	12	5	7
2023	Champions	5	5	0	0	10	0	10
2024	5th place	3	1	0	2	5	3	2

=== CAF Women's Champions League COSAFA qualifier record ===
Season	Pos	Record						
Season	Pos	P	W	D	L	F	A	GD
2021	Champions	5	5	0	0	22	1	21
2022	Runners up	3	1	2	0	9	2	7
2023	Champions	5	5	0	0	21	1	20
2025	Semi-finalist	4	3	0	1	12	2	10
2026	Champions	5	5	0	0	22	2	20

=== SAFA Women's League record ===
Season	Pos	Record							
Season	Pos	P	W	D	L	F	A	GD	Pst
2019-20	Champions	22	21	1	0	83	13	70	64
2021	Champions	26	24	1	1	87	14	73	73
2022	Champions	30	27	1	2	126	13	113	82
2023	Champions	30	26	3	1	97	15	82	81
2024	Champions	30	27	2	1	114	12	102	83
2025	Champions	30	26	2	2	86	7	79	80

- Orange = In progress
- Gold = Champions
- Silver = Runner up

==== SAFA Women's League statistics ====
- Record number of games won in a season: 27 games (2022 and 2024)
- Record number of points in a season: 83 points (2024)
- Record goals scored in a season: 126 goals (2022)
- Record for lowest number of goals conceded in a season: 7 goals (2025)
- Record for lowest number of defeats in a season: no games lost (2019–20)

== See also ==
- Mamelodi Sundowns F.C.
- Mamelodi Sundowns Ladies Academy
- SAFA Women's League
