= SAFA Provincial Women's League =

- Organising body: SAFA
- Founded: 2009; 17 years ago
- Country: South Africa
- Divisions: 18
- Number of clubs: 144
- Level on pyramid: 2
- Promotion to: SAFA Women's League
- Relegation to: SAFA Women's Regional League
- Current champions: Diepkloof Ladies (1st title) (2025)
- Most championships: Palace Super Falcons (3 titles)
- Broadcaster(s): SABC
- Current: 2026 SAFA Provincial Women's League

The SAFA Provincial Women's League is the second-tier South African women's association football league. It is semi-professional, and operates as a provincial league, with two "streams" of 8–10 teams in each of South Africa's nine provinces (in some cases, multiple streams per province), and each province's champion then competing in a single-location national championship tournament.

The championship's two finalists are then promoted to the (professional, first-tier) SAFA Women's League, while the bottom two teams in each province's standings are relegated to the SAFA Women's Regional League of their respective province.

== History ==
The SAFA Provincial Women's League was originally launched in 2009 as the Absa Women's League, in partnership with Absa Bank, in order to improve the South African women's national team's international performances.

The logo of the Provincial Women's League when it was sponsored by Sasol.

From the 2013 season the league sponsorship was granted to energy and chemical company Sasol Limited on a 4-year partnership and the league branded the Sasol League. The sponsorship ended in 2024.

== Annual Champions ==
A list of champions and runners-ups:, since its founding 12 different teams from 7 provinces have won the SAFA Pronvincial Women's League:

Year	Champions	Runners-up
ABSA Women's League
2009	Detroit Ladies	Palace Super Falcons
2010	Palace Super Falcons	Detroit Ladies
2011	Palace Super Falcons	Brazilian Ladies
2012	Palace Super Falcons	Cape Town Roses
Sasol League
2013	Mamelodi Sundowns Ladies	Ma-Indies Ladies
2014	Cape Town Roses	Palace Super Falcons
2015	Mamelodi Sundowns Ladies	Cape Town Roses
2016	Bloemfontein Celtics Ladies	JVW
2017	Bloemfontein Celtics Ladies	Cape Town Roses
2018	Tshwane University of Technology	Durban Ladies
2019	JVW	Ma-Indies Ladies
2020	Cancelled due to the COVID-19 pandemic in South Africa	
2021	Vasco da Gama	City Lads Ladies
2022	Copperbelt Ladies	University of Pretoria
2023	University of Fort Hare	Lindelani Ladies
2024	Ezemvelo	University of Cape Town
SAFA Provincial Women's League
2025	Diepkloof Ladies	Ramatlaohle

=== Performance by province ===
Province	Winners	Runners-up	Winner	Runners-up
Gauteng	8	4	Palace Super Falcons (3); Mamelodi Sundowns (2); Tshwane University of Technology; JVW; Diepkloof Ladies	Palace Super Falcons (2); JVW; University of Pretoria
Western Cape	2	4	Cape Town Roses; Vasco Da Gama	Cape Town Roses (3); University of Cape Town
Free State	2	0	Bloemfontein Celtics Ladies (2)	
Limpopo	1	4	Copperbelt Ladies	Brazilians Ladies; Ma-Indies Ladies (2); Ramatlaohle
KwaZulu-Natal	1	2	Ezemvelo	Durban Ladies; Lindelani Ladies
Eastern Cape	1	1	University of Fort Hare	City Lads
Mpumalanga	1	1	Detroit Ladies	Detroit Ladies
