= SAFA Women's League =

Hollywoodbets Super League
- Founded: 2019; 7 years ago
- Country: South Africa
- Confederation: CAF
- Number of clubs: 16
- Level on pyramid: 1
- Relegation to: Sasol Women’s League
- International cup(s): COSAFA Women's Champions League; CAF Women's Champions League
- Current champions: Mamelodi Sundowns Ladies (8th title) (2025)
- Most championships: Mamelodi Sundowns Ladies (8 titles)
- Top scorer: Nompumelelo Nyandeni (87 goals)
- Broadcaster(s): SABC1; SABC Sport
- Website: safa.net
- Current: 2026 SAFA W-League

The SAFA Women's League, known as Hollywoodbets Super League for sponsorship reasons, is the top flight of women's association football in South Africa. The competition is run by the South African Football Association. The league comprises 16 (originally 12) teams which won promotion from their respective Sasol Women's Provincial League divisions. The champion now earns entry into the COSAFA Women's Champions League.

== History ==
Prior to the formation of the SAFA Women's League in 2019, a series of predecessor competitions crowned an annual national women's champion club for South Africa.

=== Inter-Provincial Women’s Championship (1976–1990) ===
Women's football started in 1976 by founding an Inter-Provincial Championship until 1990. Natal United FC have a record of 9 championships.

=== SAFA Women's Championship (2001-2009) ===
From 2001 until 2009, a series of championships were organized by SAFA between the champion of each SAFA Region or province. In 2001-2002 this was known as the Sanlam National Women's Championship and involved champions of SAFA's then-25 regions. In 2005-06, the national playoffs were known as the Vodacom Women's League. In 2008-09, this event was replaced by the Absa Women's League, which later became SAFA's regional league (sub-provincial).

=== Sasol Women’s National League (2009–2019) ===
The Sasol Women's League is a provincial women's football league which was formed in 2009 when Sasol and the South African Football Association (SAFA) went into partnership for women's football in South Africa. The league runs separate leagues for each of the nine provinces, and brings their champions together to play the National Championship, and its winner is promoted to the SAFA Women's League. Following the formation of the SAFA Women's League, the Sasol League became its second-tier / feeder league and no longer crowned the national champion.

=== SAFA Women's League (2019–present) ===
Following rumors as early as 2017 of SAFA establishing a professional women's league, the association indeed announced the formation of the SAFA Women's National League in August 2019. The new league replaced the previous inter-regional play (which had been limited only to the national championship tournament) with a national double-round-robin league of the country's top clubs. The league's first season was played in 2019-20, and began with the previous season's respective provincial champions, plus two women's affiliates of PSL clubs and the university league champion, as the initial 12 members. The initial season's start date was pushed back to August 2019 in order to accommodate Banyana Banyana's participation at the 2019 FIFA Women's World Cup. In the first two seasons, there was no relegation: 2 teams were promoted to make 14 in 2020, and another 2 were promoted to make 16 in 2021, with relegation then beginning in the 2022 season.

== Champions ==
A list of champions and runners-ups:

Year	Champions	Runners-up
Sasol Women's League
2009	Detroit Ladies	Palace Super Falcons
2010	Palace Super Falcons	Detroit Ladies
2011	Palace Super Falcons	Brazilians Ladies
2012	Palace Super Falcons	Cape Town Roses
2013	Mamelodi Sundowns Ladies	Ma-Indies Ladies
2014	Cape Town Roses	Palace Super Falcons
2015	Mamelodi Sundowns Ladies	Cape Town Roses
2016	Bloemfontein Celtic Ladies	JVW
2017	Bloemfontein Celtic Ladies	Cape Town Roses
2018	TUT Ladies	Durban Ladies
2019	JVW FC	Ma-Indies Ladies
SAFA Women's League
2020	Mamelodi Sundowns Ladies	TUT Ladies
2021	Mamelodi Sundowns Ladies	TUT Ladies
2022	Mamelodi Sundowns Ladies	UWC Ladies
2023	Mamelodi Sundowns Ladies	UWC Ladies
2024	Mamelodi Sundowns Ladies	UWC Ladies
2025	Mamelodi Sundowns Ladies	JVW

== Top scorer and winning coach ==
Year	Top scorer	Goals	Winning Coach
2020	(South Africa) Rhoda Mulaudzi	36	(South Africa) Jerry Tshabalala
2020	(South Africa) Hildah Magaia	36	(South Africa) Jerry Tshabalala
2021	(South Africa) Nompumelelo Nyandeni	27	(South Africa) Jerry Tshabalala
2021	(South Africa) Andisiwe Mgcoyi	27	(South Africa) Jerry Tshabalala
2022	(South Africa) Nompumelelo Nyandeni	30	(South Africa) Jerry Tshabalala
2023	(South Africa) Sphumelele Shamase	22	(South Africa) Jerry Tshabalala
2024	(Lesotho) Boitumelo Rabale	17	(South Africa) Jerry Tshabalala
2025	(South Africa) Leandra Smeda	22	(South Africa) Godfrey Sapula

== Most successful clubs ==
Rank	Club	Champions	Runners-up	Winning seasons	Runners-up seasons
1	Mamelodi Sundowns	8	0	2013, 2015, 2020, 2021, 2022, 2023, 2024, 2025	
2	Palace Super Falcons	3	2	2010, 2011, 2012	2009, 2014
3	Bloemfontein Celtic	2	0	2016, 2017	
4	Cape Town Roses	1	3	2014	2012, 2015, 2017
5	TUT Ladies	1	2	2018	2020, 2021
5	JVW	1	2	2019	2016, 2025
7	Detroit Ladies	1	1	2009	2010
8	UWC Ladies	0	3		2022, 2023, 2024
9	Ma-Indies Ladies	0	2		2013, 2019
10	Brazilians Ladies	0	1		2011
10	Durban Ladies	0	1		2018

== League records ==
- Most titles: 8 – Mamelodi Sundowns Ladies
- Biggest League win: 0–13 – Mamelodi Sundowns Ladies vs Thunderbirds Ladies (2024)
- Most goals scored in a season: 126 – Mamelodi Sundowns Ladies (2022)
- Most goals conceded in a season: 129 – Thunderbirds Ladies (2024)
- Most points in a season: 82 – Mamelodi Sundowns Ladies (2022)

== Sponsorships ==
During the beginning of the 2021–22 season, South African Football Association announced that they secured a naming-rights deal with Hollywoodbets. The deal is worth about R17 million, with the winner receiving R2 million while runners up receive R1 million. They also sponsor the awards at the end of the season, giving away prize money of R50,000 to the player of the season, young player of the season, coach of the season as well as top goal score. The deal was set to be a 3-year deal. SAFA and Hollywoodbets renewed the deal in May 2025.

== Broadcasting ==
SABC are currently the only broadcaster for SAFA Women's League. They broadcast matches throughout their three channels: SABC 1, SABC 3 and SABC Sport. They only broadcast two matches during the weekend.

== Founding teams ==
A list of the teams that took part in the inaugural SAFA Women's League:

Bold entries are participating in the 2026 season.

Team	Province
Thunderbirds Ladies	Eastern Cape
Bloemfontein Celtics Ladies	Free State
Tsunami Queens	Free State
Mamelodi Sundowns Ladies	Gauteng
TUT Ladies	Gauteng
UJ Ladies	Gauteng
Durban Ladies	Kwa-Zulu Natal
First Touch	Limpopo
Coal City Wizards	Mpumalanga
Richmond United	Northern Cape
Golden Ladies	North West
UWC Ladies	Western Cape
