= List of soccer clubs in South Africa =

This is a list of association football or soccer clubs in South Africa by provinces. For a complete list see Category:Soccer clubs in South Africa

== Eastern Cape ==
- Bizana Pondo Chiefs F.C.
- Bush Bucks F.C.
- Chippa United F.C.
- Highbury F.C.

=== Defunct ===
- Port Elizabeth Blackpool F.C.
- Michau Warriors F.C.
- Tembu Royals F.C.

== Free State ==
- African Warriors F.C.
- Bloemfontein Celtic F.C.
- Bloemfontein Young Tigers
- Free State Stars F.C.
- Maluti FET College F.C.
- Marumo Gallants F.C.

== Gauteng ==
- Atlie F.C.
- FC AK
- Garankuwa United F.C.
- Gomora United
- Highlands Park F.C.
- JDR Stars F.C.
- Jomo Cosmos F.C.
- Kaizer Chiefs F.C.
- Leruma United F.C.
- Lusitano F.C. (South Africa)
- M Tigers F.C.
- Mamelodi Sundowns F.C.
- MM Platinum F.C.
- Orlando Pirates F.C.
- Pretoria Callies F.C.
- SuperSport United F.C.
- Swallows F.C.
- University of Pretoria F.C.
- Wits University F.C.

=== Defunct ===
- Bidvest Wits F.C.
- Fidentia Rangers F.C.
- Germiston Callies F.C.
- Mighty Birds F.C.
- Parkhurst Academy

== KwaZulu Natal ==
- AmaZulu F.C.
- Durban City F.C. (2024)
- Durban Stars F.C.
- Durban United F.C.
- Hellenic F.C.
- Lamontville Golden Arrows F.C.
- Milford F.C.
- Richards Bay F.C.
- Royal AM F.C.
- Uthongathi F.C.

=== Defunct ===
- Durban City F.C.
- Manning Rangers F.C.
- Maritzburg F.C.
- Maritzburg United F.C.
- Nathi Lions F.C.
- Sobantu Shooting Stars F.C.
- Thanda Royal Zulu F.C.

== Limpopo ==
- Baroka F.C.
- Black Leopards F.C.
- Dynamos F.C. (South Africa)
- Magesi F.C.
- Polokwane City F.C.
- Polokwane United F.C.
- Sekhukhune United F.C.
- Tshakhuma Tsha Madzivhandila F.C.
- Venda F.C.
- Winners Park F.C.

== Mpumalanga ==
- Real Native (formerly Casric Stars)
- Kruger United
- Leicesterford City
- The Bees
- TS Galaxy
- TS Sporting

=== Defunct ===
- Mbombela United
- Mpumalanga Black Aces
- Sivutsa Stars

== Northern Cape ==
- Hungry Lions F.C.
- Louisvale Pirates
- United F.C. (South Africa)
- Upington City F.C.

== North West ==
- Lerumo Lions F.C.
- Orbit College F.C.
- Platinum City Rovers F.C.

=== Defunct ===
- Platinum Stars F.C.

== Western Cape ==
- Avendale Athletico
- Battswood
- Cape Town City (2016)
- Cape Town Spurs
- F.C. Cape Town
- Hanover Park
- Hellenic
- Ikapa Sporting
- Old Mutual
- Santos
- Saxon Rovers
- Steenberg United
- Stellenbosch
- Ubuntu Cape Town
- University of Cape Town
- Vasco da Gama
- Western Province United
- Wynberg St Johns

=== Defunct ===
- Ajax Cape Town
- Cape Umoya United
- Cape Town City (1960)
- Milano United
- Mother City
- Seven Stars

== Women's football clubs ==
- Cape Town Roses
- Central University of Technology, Free State Women's F.C.
- City Lads F.C.
- Copperbelt Ladies F.C.
- Coal City Wizards
- Croesus Ladies
- Durban Ladies F.C.
- First Touch F.C.
- JVW F.C.
- Kanatla Ladies
- Lindelani Ladies F.C.
- Ma-Indies Ladies
- Mamelodi Sundowns Ladies F.C.
- Mamelodi Sundowns Ladies Academy
- Palace Super Falcons Women's Academy
- Richmond United F.C.
- Royal AM Women F.C.
- Spurs
- Stellenbosch Women's F.C.
- Thunderbirds Ladies F.C.
- TS Galaxy Queens F.C.
- TUT Matsatsantsa Ladies F.C.
- University of Cape Town Women's F.C.
- UFH Ladies F.C.
- UJ Ladies F.C.
- TUKS Ladies F.C.
- UWC Ladies F.C.
- Witwatersrand University Women's F.C.

=== Defunct ===
- Vakhegula Vakhegula F.C.

== See also ==
- List of South African soccer club franchise sales and name changes
