= SAFA Women's League awards =

- Awarded for: The most outstanding players in each category in the women's league
- Sponsored by: Hollywoodbets
- Country: South Africa
- Presented by: SAFA Women's League
- Established: 2021; 5 years ago
- Most wins: Boitumelo Rabale (6 wins)

The SAFA Women's League awards, known as the Hollywoodbets Super League awards for sponsorship purposes, are an awards evening held to honour South African football players, coaches and officials in the women's game.

== Categories ==
Key
Player (X)	Name of the player and number of times they had won the award at that point (if more than one)
†	Indicates multiple award winners in the same season
‡	Denotes the club were SAFA Women's League winners in the same season

Player of the Season winners
Season	Player	Nationality	Club	Ref(s)
2019–20	Hildah Magaia	South Africa	Tshwane University of Technology	
2021	Bambanani Mbane	South Africa	Mamelodi Sundowns Ladies^{‡}	
2022	Boitumelo Rabale	Lesotho	Mamelodi Sundowns Ladies^{‡}	
2023	Boitumelo Rabale (2)	Lesotho	Mamelodi Sundowns Ladies^{‡}	
2024	Amogelang Motau	South Africa	University of the Western Cape	
2025	Leandra Smeda†	South Africa	TS Galaxy Queens	

Young player of the Season winners
Season	Player	Nationality	Club	Ref(s)
2019–20	Kananelo Taiwe	South Africa	Bloemfontein Celtic Ladies	
2021	Nthabiseng Majiya	South Africa	Richmond United	
2022	Nthabiseng Majiya (2)	South Africa	Richmond United	
2023	Mmabatho Mogale	South Africa	University of Pretoria	
2024	Khwezi Khoza	South Africa	Durban Ladies	
2025	Bonolo Mokoma†	South Africa	JVW	

Goalkeeper of the Season winners
Season	Player	Nationality	Club	Ref(s)
2019–20	Andile Dlamini	South Africa	Mamelodi Sundowns Ladies^{‡}	
2021	Regirl Ngobeni	South Africa	University of the Western Cape	
2022	Kebotseng Moletsane	South Africa	Bloemfontein Celtic Ladies/ Royal AM Women	
2023	Kaylin Swart	South Africa	JVW	
2024	Matshidiso Masebe	South Africa	University of Johannesburg	
2025	Dineo Magagula	South Africa	TS Galaxy Queens	

Top scorer of the Season winners
Season	Player	Nationality	Club	Ref(s)
2019–20	Hildah Magaia	South Africa	Tshwane University of Technology	
2019–20	Rhoda Mulaudzi	South Africa	Mamelodi Sundowns Ladies^{‡}	
2021	Andisiwe Mgcoyi	South Africa	Mamelodi Sundowns Ladies^{‡}	
2021	Nompumelelo Nyandeni	South Africa	JVW	
2022	Nompumelelo Nyandeni (2)	South Africa	JVW	
2023	Sphumelele Shamase	South Africa	University of Johannesburg	
2024	Boitumelo Rabale†	Lesotho	Mamelodi Sundowns Ladies^{‡}	
2025	Leandra Smeda†	South Africa	TS Galaxy Queens	

Coach of the Season winners
Season	Coach	Nationality	Club	Ref(s)
2019–20	not awarded			
2021	Jerry Tshabalala	South Africa	Mamelodi Sundowns Ladies^{‡}	
2022	Jerry Tshabalala (2)	South Africa	Mamelodi Sundowns Ladies^{‡}	
2023	Thinasonke Mbuli	South Africa	University of the Western Cape	
2024	Jerry Tshabalala (3)	South Africa	Mamelodi Sundowns Ladies^{‡}	
2025	Godfrey Sapula	South Africa	Mamelodi Sundowns Ladies^{‡}	

Players/Fans player of the Season winners
Season	Player	Nationality	Club	Ref(s)
2019–20	not awarded			
2021	not awarded			
2022	not awarded			
2023	Chuene Morifi	South Africa	Mamelodi Sundowns Ladies^{‡}	
2024	Lebogang Ramalepe	South Africa	Mamelodi Sundowns Ladies^{‡}	
2025	Bonolo Mokoma†	South Africa	JVW	

Defender of the Season winners
Season	Player	Nationality	Club	Ref(s)
2019–20	not awarded			
2021	not awarded			
2022	not awarded			
2023	not awarded			
2024	not awarded			
2025	Karabo Dhlamini	South Africa	Mamelodi Sundowns Ladies^{‡}	

Midfielder of the Season winners
Season	Player	Nationality	Club	Ref(s)
2019–20	not awarded			
2021	not awarded			
2022	not awarded			
2023	not awarded			
2024	not awarded			
2025	Jessica Wade (footballer)	South Africa	JVW	

Referee of the Season winners
Season	Referee	Nationality	Ref(s)
2019–20	not awarded		
2021	not awarded		
2022	Hloniphile Msezane	South Africa	
2023	Hloniphile Msezane (2)	South Africa	
2024	Kwandile Somtsai	South Africa	
2025	Jean Ndebele	South Africa	

Assistant Referee of the Season winners
Season	Referee	Nationality	Ref(s)
2019–20	not awarded		
2021	not awarded		
2022	Amogelang Msiza	South Africa	
2023	Amogelang Msiza (2)	South Africa	
2024	Rose Mokoena	South Africa	
2025	Nolitha Mhlomi	South Africa	

== South African Football Journalists’ Association’s award ==
The South African Football Journalists’ Association's (Safja) releases its Women's Footballer of the Year for the previous season mid year.

(Safja) Women's Footballer of the Year
Season	Player	Nationality	Club	Ref(s)
2019–20	Rhoda Mulaudzi	South Africa	Mamelodi Sundowns Ladies^{‡}	
2021	Bambanani Mbane	South Africa	Mamelodi Sundowns Ladies^{‡}	
2022	Nompumelelo Nyandeni	South Africa	JVW	
2023	Boitumelo Rabale	Lesotho	Mamelodi Sundowns Ladies^{‡}	
2024	Boitumelo Rabale† (2)	Lesotho	Mamelodi Sundowns Ladies^{‡}	
2025	Leandra Smeda†	South Africa	TS Galaxy Queens	
