= 2024 Sasol Women's League =

Sasol Women's League
- Season: 2024
- Dates: 23 March 2024 -21 September 2024
- Champions: Ezemvelo
- Best Player: Zamandosi Nene
- Top goalscorer: Matshwantsho Dlamini
- Best goalkeeper: Kaydee Windvogel

The 2024 Sasol Women's League is the 15th season of the Sasol Women's League and 4th season used as a promotion system to SAFA Women's League. The Sasol Women's League is the second tier of South African women's football.

== Provincial winners ==
| Team | Provincial League |
| Sophakama Ladies | Eastern Cape Sasol League |
| University of the Free State | Free State Sasol League |
| FC Raycon Ladies | Gauteng Sasol League |
| Ezemvelo | KwaZulu Natal Sasol League |
| Ramatlaohle Ladies | Limpopo Sasol League |
| Super Strikers Ladies | Mpumalanga Sasol League |
| Royal Wizards | Northern Cape Sasol League |
| North West University | North West Sasol League |
| University of Cape Town | Western Cape Sasol League |

== Provincial logs ==
=== Eastern Cape ===
Coastal Stream

| Pos | Team | Pld | W | D | L | GF | GA | GD | Pts | Qualification or relegation |
|---|---|---|---|---|---|---|---|---|---|---|
| 1 | Sophakama Ladies | 16 | 13 | 3 | 0 | 64 | 9 | +55 | 42 | Playoffs |
| 2 | Nav Galaxy Ladies | 16 | 10 | 2 | 4 | 38 | 14 | +24 | 32 | |
| 3 | Bay Stars Ladies | 16 | 9 | 1 | 6 | 28 | 23 | +5 | 28 | |
| 4 | Volcano Ladies | 16 | 8 | 1 | 7 | 55 | 37 | +18 | 25 | |
| 5 | MADIBAZ Football | 16 | 8 | 1 | 7 | 33 | 21 | +12 | 25 | |
| 6 | Phoenix Birds Ladies | 16 | 8 | 1 | 7 | 43 | 39 | +4 | 25 | |
| 7 | Golden Stars Ladies Football Development | 16 | 5 | 1 | 10 | 32 | 44 | −12 | 16 | |
| 8 | Kilimanjaro Stars | 16 | 4 | 1 | 11 | 19 | 51 | −32 | 13 | |
| 9 | Rhodes University Ladies | 16 | 0 | 3 | 13 | 11 | 85 | −74 | 3 | |

Inland Stream

| Pos | Team | Pld | W | D | L | GF | GA | GD | Pts | Qualification or relegation |
|---|---|---|---|---|---|---|---|---|---|---|
| 1 | Executive Ladies | 14 | 14 | 0 | 0 | 67 | 6 | +61 | 42 | Playoffs |
| 2 | Eastern Cape Peace Lovers | 14 | 12 | 0 | 2 | 47 | 13 | +34 | 36 | |
| 3 | Ayakha Stars Ladies | 14 | 8 | 2 | 4 | 28 | 23 | +5 | 26 | |
| 4 | Red Roses Ladies | 14 | 5 | 1 | 8 | 10 | 23 | −13 | 16 | |
| 5 | UWS Mthatha Campus Ladies | 14 | 4 | 0 | 10 | 17 | 36 | −19 | 12 | |
| 6 | Eastern Rangers FC | 14 | 3 | 3 | 8 | 14 | 35 | −21 | 12 | |
| 7 | 4800 Ladies | 14 | 3 | 3 | 8 | 15 | 37 | −22 | 12 | |
| 8 | Coastal United Ladies | 14 | 1 | 3 | 10 | 10 | 35 | −25 | 6 | |

=== Free State ===
Stream A

| Pos | Team | Pld | W | D | L | GF | GA | GD | Pts | Qualification or relegation |
|---|---|---|---|---|---|---|---|---|---|---|
| 1 | Ixias Ladies | 14 | 13 | 1 | 0 | 83 | 1 | +82 | 40 | Playoffs |
| 2 | Metsimaholo Ladies | 14 | 10 | 2 | 2 | 47 | 9 | +38 | 32 | |
| 3 | Inter Madrid Academy | 14 | 7 | 4 | 3 | 34 | 13 | +21 | 25 | |
| 4 | Grassland Ladies | 14 | 5 | 4 | 5 | 29 | 22 | +7 | 19 | |
| 5 | Peace Lovers | 14 | 5 | 4 | 5 | 24 | 23 | +1 | 19 | |
| 6 | Napoli Ladies | 14 | 3 | 4 | 7 | 35 | 40 | −5 | 13 | |
| 7 | Queens | 14 | 3 | 1 | 10 | 16 | 36 | −20 | 10 | |
| 8 | FC Kodisang Ladies | 0 | 0 | 0 | 0 | 0 | 0 | 0 | 0 | |
| 9 | FC Kerlis | 14 | 0 | 0 | 14 | 3 | 127 | −124 | 0 | |

Stream B

| Pos | Team | Pld | W | D | L | GF | GA | GD | Pts | Qualification or relegation |
|---|---|---|---|---|---|---|---|---|---|---|
| 1 | Kovsies Ladies | 14 | 13 | 1 | 0 | 107 | 8 | +99 | 40 | Playoffs |
| 2 | Central University of FS | 14 | 12 | 1 | 1 | 116 | 11 | +105 | 37 | |
| 3 | TTKay | 14 | 9 | 0 | 5 | 54 | 21 | +33 | 27 | |
| 4 | Mangaung Ajax | 14 | 8 | 0 | 6 | 43 | 28 | +15 | 24 | |
| 5 | Ravens | 12 | 6 | 0 | 6 | 22 | 52 | −30 | 18 | |
| 6 | Dikonyela FC | 14 | 3 | 0 | 11 | 17 | 75 | −58 | 9 | |
| 7 | Molefe Khalinkomo | 14 | 2 | 0 | 12 | 10 | 85 | −75 | 6 | |
| 8 | Derby | 14 | 2 | 0 | 12 | 15 | 104 | −89 | 6 | |
| 9 | Dimamarela | 0 | 0 | 0 | 0 | 0 | 0 | 0 | 0 | |

=== Gauteng ===
Stream A

| Pos | Team | Pld | W | D | L | GF | GA | GD | Pts | Qualification or relegation |
|---|---|---|---|---|---|---|---|---|---|---|
| 1 | Mito Ladies | 14 | 10 | 3 | 1 | 27 | 11 | +16 | 33 | Playoffs |
| 2 | Diepkloof Ladies | 14 | 9 | 2 | 3 | 43 | 15 | +28 | 29 | |
| 3 | University of Johannesburg | 14 | 6 | 6 | 2 | 20 | 11 | +9 | 24 | |
| 4 | Kempton Park Ladies | 14 | 5 | 3 | 6 | 18 | 21 | −3 | 18 | |
| 5 | Blue Birds Ladies Football Academy | 14 | 4 | 6 | 4 | 16 | 21 | −5 | 18 | |
| 6 | North West University Vaal | 14 | 5 | 2 | 7 | 30 | 33 | −3 | 17 | |
| 7 | Future Stars Ladies | 14 | 3 | 1 | 10 | 16 | 31 | −15 | 10 | |
| 8 | Mathaithai | 14 | 2 | 1 | 11 | 12 | 39 | −27 | 7 | |

Stream B

| Pos | Team | Pld | W | D | L | GF | GA | GD | Pts | Qualification or relegation |
|---|---|---|---|---|---|---|---|---|---|---|
| 1 | FC Raycon Ladies | 14 | 10 | 2 | 2 | 37 | 11 | +26 | 32 | Playoffs |
| 2 | Croesus Ladies | 14 | 10 | 2 | 2 | 28 | 10 | +18 | 32 | |
| 3 | Wits University | 14 | 6 | 2 | 6 | 30 | 27 | +3 | 20 | |
| 4 | Nicko Taurus | 14 | 5 | 3 | 6 | 25 | 29 | −4 | 18 | |
| 5 | JVW | 14 | 5 | 3 | 6 | 22 | 26 | −4 | 18 | |
| 6 | Hallelujah Zebra Force | 14 | 4 | 3 | 7 | 21 | 36 | −15 | 15 | |
| 7 | Springs Home Sweepers | 14 | 4 | 2 | 8 | 23 | 27 | −4 | 14 | |
| 8 | Vikings Ladies | 14 | 3 | 1 | 10 | 10 | 23 | −13 | 10 | |

=== Kwazulu Natal ===
Stream A

| Pos | Team | Pld | W | D | L | GF | GA | GD | Pts | Qualification or relegation |
|---|---|---|---|---|---|---|---|---|---|---|
| 1 | Newcastle Chess | 16 | 15 | 1 | 0 | 78 | 7 | +71 | 46 | Playoffs |
| 2 | Dlala Ntombazane | 16 | 13 | 1 | 2 | 48 | 13 | +35 | 40 | |
| 3 | DUT Midlands | 16 | 7 | 3 | 6 | 25 | 22 | +3 | 24 | |
| 4 | DUT Coastal | 16 | 5 | 7 | 4 | 26 | 17 | +9 | 22 | |
| 5 | Sunflower | 16 | 5 | 4 | 7 | 32 | 28 | +4 | 19 | |
| 6 | PSG Amabhaca Ladies | 16 | 5 | 4 | 7 | 18 | 37 | −19 | 19 | |
| 7 | Diski Pros Academy | 16 | 5 | 3 | 8 | 19 | 35 | −16 | 18 | |
| 8 | University of KwaZulu Natal | 16 | 3 | 5 | 8 | 21 | 41 | −20 | 14 | |
| 9 | Umlazi Arsenal | 16 | 0 | 0 | 16 | 2 | 69 | −67 | 0 | |

Stream B

| Pos | Team | Pld | W | D | L | GF | GA | GD | Pts | Qualification or relegation |
|---|---|---|---|---|---|---|---|---|---|---|
| 1 | Ezemvelo | 16 | 14 | 2 | 0 | 62 | 7 | +55 | 44 | Playoffs |
| 2 | Romans Stars | 16 | 9 | 4 | 3 | 32 | 20 | +12 | 31 | |
| 3 | Westvill United | 16 | 7 | 5 | 4 | 25 | 21 | +4 | 26 | |
| 4 | University of Zululand | 16 | 5 | 4 | 7 | 21 | 22 | −1 | 19 | |
| 5 | Makhanisi FC | 16 | 5 | 3 | 8 | 28 | 33 | −5 | 18 | |
| 6 | Sapphire Ladies | 16 | 5 | 3 | 8 | 26 | 34 | −8 | 18 | |
| 7 | Mshwathi Future Stars | 16 | 4 | 5 | 7 | 18 | 25 | −7 | 17 | |
| 8 | Darnall | 16 | 4 | 4 | 8 | 17 | 34 | −17 | 16 | |
| 9 | Shooting Stars | 16 | 2 | 4 | 10 | 13 | 46 | −33 | 10 | |

=== Limpopo ===
Stream A

| Pos | Team | Pld | W | D | L | GF | GA | GD | Pts | Qualification or relegation |
|---|---|---|---|---|---|---|---|---|---|---|
| 1 | Ramatlaohle Ladies | 14 | 14 | 0 | 0 | 43 | 1 | +42 | 42 | Playoffs |
| 2 | Marumo Gallants Ladies | 14 | 8 | 1 | 5 | 23 | 17 | +6 | 25 | |
| 3 | Dinaledi Ladies | 13 | 6 | 4 | 3 | 36 | 12 | +24 | 22 | |
| 4 | Golden Diamonds Ladies | 13 | 6 | 2 | 5 | 24 | 16 | +8 | 20 | |
| 5 | University of Limpopo | 12 | 6 | 0 | 6 | 23 | 16 | +7 | 18 | |
| 6 | Kanatla Ladies | 13 | 3 | 2 | 8 | 9 | 25 | −16 | 11 | |
| 7 | Ma-Indies Ladies | 13 | 1 | 3 | 9 | 10 | 31 | −21 | 6 | |
| 8 | Mandebele Happy Fighters Ladies | 12 | 1 | 2 | 9 | 12 | 62 | −50 | 5 | |

Stream B

| Pos | Team | Pld | W | D | L | GF | GA | GD | Pts | Qualification or relegation |
|---|---|---|---|---|---|---|---|---|---|---|
| 1 | Sinthumulekutama | 15 | 12 | 2 | 1 | 35 | 11 | +24 | 38 | Playoffs |
| 2 | Sisters | 16 | 11 | 4 | 1 | 34 | 15 | +19 | 37 | |
| 3 | Rodadau | 15 | 10 | 1 | 4 | 30 | 15 | +15 | 31 | |
| 4 | Lacoste Morning Stars | 15 | 6 | 4 | 5 | 15 | 14 | +1 | 22 | |
| 5 | Real Mighty Ladies | 15 | 4 | 4 | 7 | 17 | 24 | −7 | 16 | |
| 6 | Masakona Liberty Experience | 15 | 3 | 6 | 6 | 14 | 23 | −9 | 15 | |
| 7 | Sealene Ladies | 15 | 4 | 2 | 9 | 18 | 25 | −7 | 14 | |
| 8 | Tshandama Young Stars | 14 | 3 | 2 | 9 | 10 | 26 | −16 | 11 | |
| 9 | Merwe United Ladies | 14 | 0 | 3 | 11 | 11 | 31 | −20 | 3 | |

=== Mpumalanga ===
Steam A

| Pos | Team | Pld | W | D | L | GF | GA | GD | Pts | RQ |
|---|---|---|---|---|---|---|---|---|---|---|
| 1 | Sasol Juventus Ladies | 16 | 11 | 4 | 1 | 37 | 9 | +28 | 37 | Playoffs |
| 2 | Storm Ladies | 16 | 11 | 3 | 2 | 46 | 18 | +28 | 36 | |
| 3 | Two Touch | 16 | 9 | 1 | 6 | 35 | 22 | +13 | 28 | |
| 4 | Botleng United Ladies | 16 | 8 | 2 | 6 | 39 | 33 | +6 | 26 | |
| 5 | Coal City Wizards | 16 | 7 | 3 | 6 | 38 | 34 | +4 | 24 | |
| 6 | Leandra United | 16 | 3 | 6 | 7 | 20 | 27 | −7 | 15 | |
| 7 | Breytan Stars Ladies | 16 | 3 | 6 | 7 | 19 | 31 | −12 | 15 | |
| 8 | Silindile Ladies | 16 | 2 | 4 | 10 | 24 | 44 | −20 | 10 | |
| 9 | Sasol Thistle Grove Ladies | 16 | 2 | 3 | 11 | 10 | 50 | −40 | 9 | |

Stream B

| Pos | Team | Pld | W | D | L | GF | GA | GD | Pts | Qualification or relegation |
|---|---|---|---|---|---|---|---|---|---|---|
| 1 | Super Strikers Ladies | 14 | 13 | 0 | 1 | 71 | 8 | +63 | 39 | Playoffs |
| 2 | The Rockets | 14 | 13 | 0 | 1 | 60 | 11 | +49 | 39 | |
| 3 | Absa Sport Academy | 14 | 4 | 6 | 4 | 16 | 31 | −15 | 18 | |
| 4 | Destiny College Ladies | 14 | 2 | 8 | 4 | 9 | 16 | −7 | 14 | |
| 5 | Tebza Stars | 14 | 3 | 4 | 7 | 10 | 35 | −25 | 13 | |
| 6 | Likazi Ladies | 14 | 2 | 5 | 7 | 6 | 26 | −20 | 11 | |
| 7 | OG Dynamite Ladies | 14 | 3 | 2 | 9 | 10 | 26 | −16 | 11 | |
| 8 | MButterfly Ladies | 14 | 0 | 6 | 8 | 5 | 27 | −22 | 6 | |

=== North West ===
Steam A

| Pos | Team | Pld | W | D | L | GF | GA | GD | Pts | RQ |
|---|---|---|---|---|---|---|---|---|---|---|
| 1 | Royal Queens | 16 | 14 | 1 | 1 | 94 | 17 | +77 | 43 | Playoffs |
| 2 | Tswelelang De'Scorpion | 16 | 13 | 2 | 1 | 73 | 14 | +59 | 41 | |
| 3 | NWU Tawana | 16 | 11 | 2 | 3 | 70 | 11 | +59 | 35 | |
| 4 | Rustenburg Ladies | 16 | 7 | 2 | 7 | 31 | 27 | +4 | 23 | |
| 5 | North West Rockets | 16 | 7 | 2 | 7 | 24 | 31 | −7 | 23 | |
| 6 | Bapong Future Stars Ladies | 16 | 5 | 2 | 9 | 22 | 48 | −26 | 17 | |
| 7 | Echo Ladies | 16 | 4 | 2 | 10 | 19 | 60 | −41 | 14 | |
| 8 | Young Stars | 16 | 3 | 0 | 13 | 14 | 73 | −59 | 9 | |
| 9 | Freedom Stars Ladies | 16 | 1 | 1 | 14 | 11 | 77 | −66 | 4 | |

Stream B

| Pos | Team | Pld | W | D | L | GF | GA | GD | Pts | Qualification or relegation |
|---|---|---|---|---|---|---|---|---|---|---|
| 1 | North West University | 14 | 13 | 1 | 0 | 49 | 6 | +43 | 40 | Playoffs |
| 2 | Thames Ladies | 14 | 8 | 4 | 2 | 34 | 18 | +16 | 28 | |
| 3 | Mafikeng Ladies | 16 | 8 | 2 | 6 | 39 | 19 | +20 | 26 | |
| 4 | Rise and Sines | 14 | 8 | 1 | 5 | 43 | 21 | +22 | 25 | |
| 5 | Bianca Academy | 14 | 4 | 3 | 7 | 27 | 29 | −2 | 15 | |
| 6 | Keleku | 14 | 3 | 5 | 6 | 20 | 27 | −7 | 14 | |
| 7 | The Bold & The Beautiful | 14 | 3 | 2 | 9 | 19 | 34 | −15 | 11 | |
| 8 | Golden Ladies | 14 | 0 | 0 | 14 | 7 | 84 | −77 | 0 | |

=== Northern Cape ===
Steam A

| Pos | Team | Pld | W | D | L | GF | GA | GD | Pts | RQ |
|---|---|---|---|---|---|---|---|---|---|---|
| 1 | NC Consciousness Ladies | 16 | 13 | 0 | 3 | 45 | 15 | +30 | 39 | Playoffs |
| 2 | Black Spurs | 16 | 10 | 3 | 3 | 41 | 13 | +28 | 33 | |
| 3 | Bodulong United | 16 | 9 | 3 | 4 | 50 | 17 | +33 | 30 | |
| 4 | Pako Ladies | 16 | 7 | 4 | 5 | 25 | 16 | +9 | 25 | |
| 5 | Blinkklip Ladies | 16 | 7 | 2 | 7 | 29 | 20 | +9 | 23 | |
| 6 | Tlhaping Flowers | 16 | 6 | 3 | 7 | 33 | 29 | +4 | 21 | |
| 7 | First Touch Ladies | 16 | 5 | 3 | 8 | 12 | 21 | −9 | 18 | |
| 8 | RC Mills Ladies | 16 | 3 | 4 | 9 | 37 | 50 | −13 | 13 | |
| 9 | Sesheng United | 16 | 1 | 0 | 15 | 6 | 97 | −91 | 3 | |

Stream B

| Pos | Team | Pld | W | D | L | GF | GA | GD | Pts | Qualification or relegation |
|---|---|---|---|---|---|---|---|---|---|---|
| 1 | Royal Wizards | 16 | 14 | 2 | 0 | 89 | 5 | +84 | 44 | Playoffs |
| 2 | Diamond Ladies | 16 | 12 | 2 | 2 | 50 | 10 | +40 | 38 | |
| 3 | Pixley Ladies | 16 | 10 | 1 | 5 | 52 | 33 | +19 | 31 | |
| 4 | Rising Stars Ladies | 16 | 10 | 1 | 5 | 47 | 34 | +13 | 31 | |
| 5 | Amakipkip | 16 | 6 | 2 | 8 | 27 | 36 | −9 | 20 | |
| 6 | Fast Eleven Ladies | 16 | 5 | 3 | 8 | 21 | 39 | −18 | 18 | |
| 7 | TPower Boys Ladies | 16 | 3 | 4 | 9 | 22 | 44 | −22 | 13 | |
| 8 | Khs Ladies | 16 | 1 | 3 | 12 | 15 | 51 | −36 | 6 | |
| 9 | Griqua-Chiefs | 16 | 2 | 0 | 14 | 13 | 84 | −71 | 6 | |

=== Western Cape ===
Steam A

| Pos | Team | Pld | W | D | L | GF | GA | GD | Pts | RQ |
|---|---|---|---|---|---|---|---|---|---|---|
| 1 | University of Cape Town | 16 | 15 | 1 | 0 | 84 | 7 | +77 | 46 | Playoffs |
| 2 | Heideveld Female Football Academy | 16 | 11 | 0 | 5 | 38 | 23 | +15 | 33 | |
| 3 | Dangerous Heroes | 16 | 9 | 4 | 3 | 31 | 18 | +13 | 31 | |
| 4 | HBU | 16 | 8 | 3 | 5 | 26 | 24 | +2 | 27 | |
| 5 | Spurs | 16 | 6 | 3 | 7 | 25 | 32 | −7 | 21 | |
| 6 | Goal Hunters | 16 | 6 | 1 | 9 | 31 | 40 | −9 | 19 | |
| 7 | Burnley | 16 | 4 | 4 | 8 | 26 | 33 | −7 | 16 | |
| 8 | Invincible Cravenby | 16 | 2 | 3 | 11 | 15 | 50 | −35 | 9 | |
| 9 | Ikamva United | 16 | 0 | 3 | 13 | 10 | 59 | −49 | 3 | |

Stream B

| Pos | Team | Pld | W | D | L | GF | GA | GD | Pts | Qualification or relegation |
|---|---|---|---|---|---|---|---|---|---|---|
| 1 | Magic Ladies | 16 | 14 | 1 | 1 | 92 | 9 | +83 | 43 | Playoffs |
| 2 | Cape Town Roses | 16 | 13 | 0 | 3 | 86 | 12 | +74 | 39 | |
| 3 | Stellenbosch Women's F.C. | 16 | 11 | 2 | 3 | 41 | 12 | +29 | 35 | |
| 4 | Santos | 16 | 8 | 0 | 8 | 24 | 46 | −22 | 24 | |
| 5 | RV United | 16 | 7 | 1 | 8 | 61 | 28 | +33 | 22 | |
| 6 | Badgers | 16 | 6 | 4 | 6 | 33 | 23 | +10 | 22 | |
| 7 | Azzurro Academy | 16 | 5 | 1 | 10 | 18 | 45 | −27 | 16 | |
| 8 | Mbekweni Sundowns | 16 | 3 | 0 | 13 | 21 | 73 | −52 | 9 | |
| 9 | Portia | 16 | 0 | 1 | 15 | 8 | 136 | −128 | 1 | |

== National playoffs ==
The Sasol League National Championship was contested by the nine provincial champions. Ezemvelo defeated University of Cape Town Women 2-0 in the final, with both teams gaining promotion to the 2025 SAFA Women's League.
