= Thokozile Mndaweni =

South African soccer player

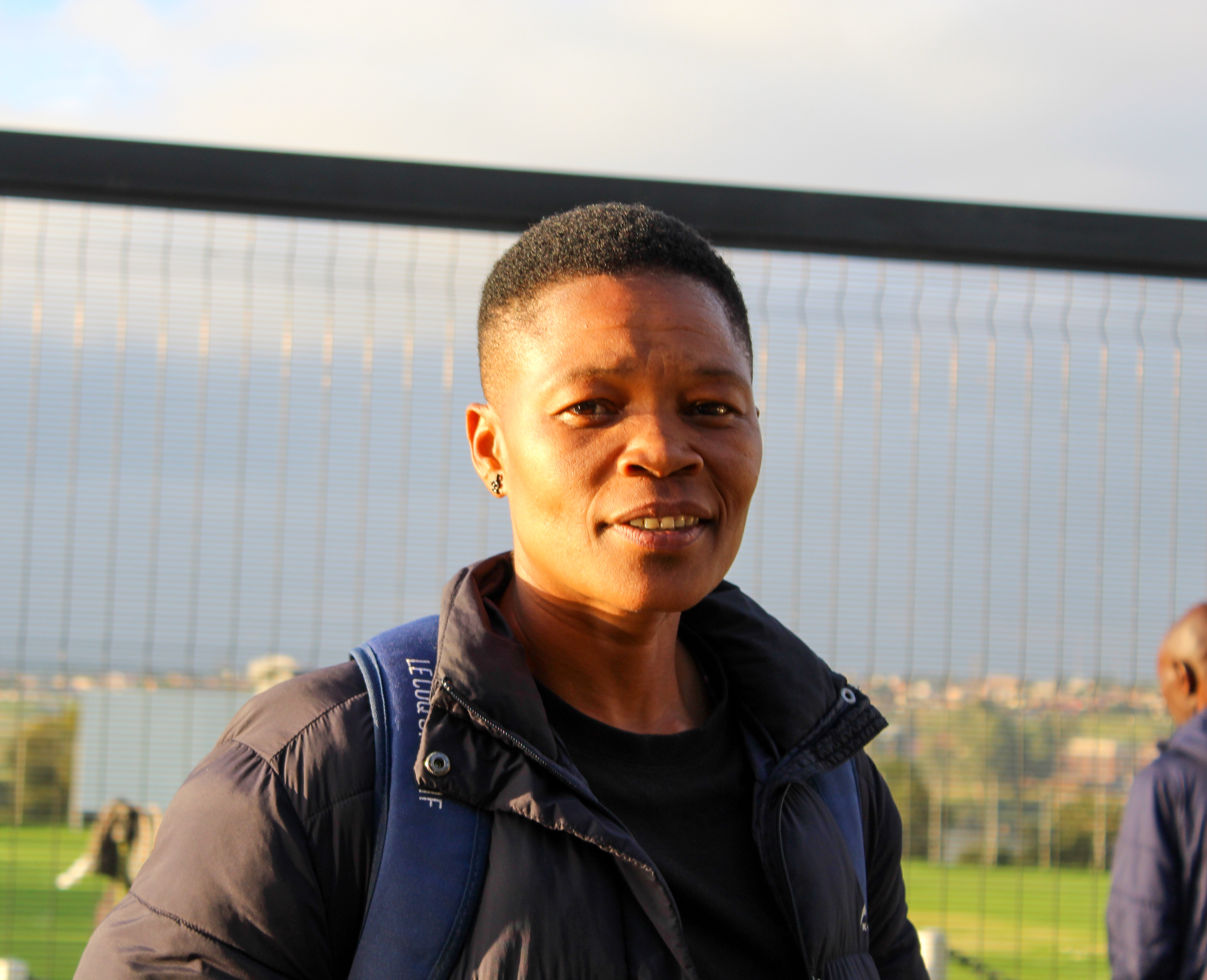
- Mndaweni in 2025

Personal information
- Full name: Thokozile Philadelphia Mndaweni
- Date of birth: 8 August 1981 (age 45)
- Place of birth: Boksburg, South Africa
- Position: Goalkeeper

Team information
- Current team: TS Galaxy Queens (goalkeeper coach)

Senior career*
Years	Team	Apps	(Gls)
2012	University of Johannesburg		
- Palace Super Falcons
- Moroka Swallows
–2022	Croesus Ladies		
2022–2023	JVW		

International career
200?–?	South Africa	89	(0)

Managerial career
- 2022–2023: JVW F.C. (goalkeeper coach)
- 2024–: TS Galaxy Queens (goalkeeper coach)
- * Club domestic league appearances and goals

Thokozile Philadelphia Mndaweni (born 8 August 1981) is a South African former soccer player who is the goalkeeping coach at TS Galaxy Queens. A goalkeeper, she is the highest capped women's goalkeeper in South Africa with 89 caps.

She represented the South Africa national team at the 2012 London Olympics.She is well known for a saving a penalty and later converting her own spot kick during South Africa's win on penalties in the Olympic qualifier return leg match in Tunis in April 2011.

== Club career ==
Mndaweni played for Sasol Women's League side Croesus Ladies where she was a player-coach helping them to a fourth place finish at the 2021 Sasol League National Championship. In April 2022 she joined JVW as a player-coach.

== International career ==
Mndaweni is capped 89 times for the South African women's national team. She is the highest capped goalkeeper as of March 2025.

== Managerial career ==
In 2022 Mndaweni joined JVW as a player-coach.

In 2024 she joined SAFA Women's League side TS Galaxy Queens as their goalkeeping coach.

Mndaweni runs the Thokozile Mndaweni Coaching Clinic and partnered with South African betting company Hollywoodbets in 2025 to support aspiring goalkeepers at grassroots level.
