= Astria Boks =

South African soccer player

- Boks in 2026

Personal information
- Date of birth: 1994 (age 31–32)
- Place of birth: Parow
- Position: Midfielder

Senior career*
| Years | Team | Apps | (Gls) |
| 2016-2020 | Santos Women | | |
| 2020-2021 | Vasco da Gama | | (6) |
| 2024- | Stellenbosch Women | | |

International career
| 2016- | South Africa | | |
- * Club domestic league appearances and goals

Astria Boks (born 1994) is a South African soccer player who plays as a midfielder for the Sasol Women's League side Stellenbosch Women and the South Africa women's national team.

== Club career ==
=== Santos Women ===
In 2016 she played for Sasol Women's League side Santos Women.

=== Vasco da Gama ===
Boks was part of the Vasco da Gama team that won the 2021 Sasol League National Championship. She scored the opening goal in the final against City Lads in a 3-2 win to be crowned champions.

=== Stellenbosch Women ===
In May 2024 she was announced as one of the players of the newly formed Sasol Women's League side Stellenbosch Women.

== International career ==
She competed for the South Africa women's senior team in a friendly match against Egypt on 22 October 2016. She was part of the squad that finished in fourth place at the 2016 Women's Africa Cup of Nations.

== Honours ==
- Sasol League National Championship: 2021
- Women's Africa Cup of Nations: Fourth: 2016
