= Jabulile Baloyi =

South African soccer coach

Personal information
- Place of birth: Soweto, South Africa

Team information
- Current team: University of the Free State (head coach)

International career
Years	Team	Apps	(Gls)
2002	South Africa		

Managerial career
- 2017-2019: University of Johannesburg
- 2020-2022: South Africa U/20
- 2021-2022: Stellenbosch University
- 2023-: University of the Free State

Jabulile Baloyi is a South African former player and professional soccer manager who is the current head coach of Sasol Women's League side the University of the Free State.

In 2018 she led University of Johannesburg to the USSA title and defended it in 2019.

== Career ==
Baloyi competed for South Africa in the 2002 African Women's Championship qualifiers.

== Managerial career ==
=== University of Johannesburg ===
In February 2017 she joined the University of Johannesburg as head coach. Her team were runners-up for the 2017 Women's Varsity Football where they lost 4-0 in the final to Tshwane University of Technology.

She led the university to the USSA title in 2018 and defended it in 2019.

=== South Africa women's under-20 ===
She coached the South Africa women's under-20 team for the 2022 African U-20 Women's World Cup qualification where the team exited in the third round after a 1-0 defeat and 0-0 draw against Uganda.

=== Stellenbosch University ===
In October 2021 she joined Stellenbosch University as head coach.

=== University of the Free State ===
In April 2023 she joined Sasol Women's League side the University of the Free State. Baloyi led the team to their maiden Free State Sasol Women's League title and qualified them for their maiden national championship.

== Honours ==
University of Johannesburg

- University Sport South Africa: 2018, 2019
- Women's Varsity Football: runners-up: 2017

University of the Free State

- Free State Sasol Women's League: 2024
