= 2025 SAFA Women's League =

SAFA Women's League
- Season: 2025
- Dates: 2 March 2025 - 11 December 2025
- Champions: Mamelodi Sundowns Ladies (8th title)
- Runner up: JVW
- Promoted: Diepkloof Ladies; Ramatlaohle
- Relegated: Royal AM Women F.C. Durban Ladies
- Matches: 238
- Goals: 590 (2.48 per match)
- Best Player: Leandra Smeda
- Top goalscorer: Leandra Smeda (22 goals)
- Best goalkeeper: Dineo Magagula
- Biggest home win: Mamelodi Sundowns Ladies 8-0 Royal AM Women (23 April 2025)
- Biggest away win: Durban Ladies 0-8 TS Galaxy Queens (10 May 2025)
- Highest scoring: UCT Ladies 2-7 UFH Ladies (26 April 2025)
- Longest winning run: Mamelodi Sundowns Ladies (11 games)
- Longest unbeaten run: Mamelodi Sundowns Ladies (17 games)
- Longest winless run: Durban Ladies (25 games)
- Longest losing run: Royal AM Women (10 games)
- All statistics correct as of 2 February 2026.

The 2025 SAFA Women's League, known as the 2025 Hollywoodbets Super League for sponsorship reasons, is the sixth season of the professional SAFA Women's League, and the 17th season of nation-wide league competition in women's football in South Africa. It is the 4th season played with 16 teams.

== Teams and locations ==
In the 2024 season, Thunderbirds Ladies and Lindelani Ladies were relegated to the Sasol Women's League, while Sasol Women's League winners Ezemvelo and runners-ups UCT Ladies were promoted to the league.

Team	Location	Stadium	Capacity	2024 Season
City Lads	New Brighton	Isaac Wolfson Stadium	10,000	14th
Copperbelts Ladies	Seshego	Seshego Stadium	15000	12th
First Touch F.C.	Polokwane	Baroka Village	1000	6th
Durban Ladies	Umlazi	Sugar Ray Xulu Stadium	6500	13th
Ezemvelo	Isipingo	Princess Magogo Stadium	10000	1st in SWL
JVW F.C.	Bedfordview	Wits Stadium	5000	5th
Mamelodi Sundowns Ladies	Pretoria	Lucas Moripe Stadium	28,900	1st
Richmond United	De Aar	Merino Park Stadium	200	10th
Royal AM Women	Pietermaritzburg	Harry Gwala Stadium	6500	7th
TS Galaxy Queens	Mbombela	Solomon Mahlangu Stadium	5000	3rd
TUT Matsatsantsa	Pretoria	TUT Stadium	2500	11th
UCT Ladies	Cape Town	UCT Kopano Astroturf	500	2nd in SWL
UFH Ladies	Alice	Davidson Stadium	200	9th
UJ Ladies	Auckland Park	UJ Stadium	8000	4th
UP-Tuks Ladies	Hatfield	Tuks Stadium	14,150	8th
UWC Ladies	Bellville	UWC Stadium	2500	2nd

== League table ==
Pos	Team	Pld	W	D	L	GF	GA	GD	Pts	Qualification or relegation
1	Mamelodi Sundowns Ladies	30	26	2	2	86	7	+79	80	COSAFA Champions League
2	JVW	30	21	6	3	61	20	+41	69	
3	TS Galaxy Queens	30	21	6	3	57	18	+39	69	
4	University of Fort Hare	30	14	10	6	45	21	+24	52	
5	University of the Western Cape	30	13	9	8	40	17	+23	48	
6	TUT Matsatsantsa Ladies	30	13	5	12	37	40	−3	44	
7	University of Johannesburg	30	12	6	12	37	41	−4	42	
8	Copperbelt Ladies	30	10	10	10	36	33	+3	40	
9	University of Pretoria	30	10	8	12	37	46	−9	38	
10	University of Cape Town	30	10	7	13	27	41	−14	37	
11	Ezemvelo	30	9	7	14	30	45	−15	34	
12	Richmond United	30	9	5	16	33	50	−17	32	
13	City Lads	30	7	6	17	29	53	−24	27	
14	First Touch	30	5	8	17	20	46	−26	23	
15	Royal AM Women	30	5	4	21	25	75	−50	19	Relegation
16	Durban Ladies	30	2	7	21	26	73	−47	13	Relegation

== Results ==
Home \ Away	CLD	CBL	DBN	EZE	FT	JVW	MSD	RMU	RAM	TUT	TSG	UCT	UFH	UJ	UP	UWC
City Lads		0–2	6–4	0–1	2–2	0–2	0–6	1–2	4–3	1–0	1–2	1–2	1–1	0–2	3–1	1–2
Copperbelt Ladies	2–0		3–0	0–2	2–0	0–0	0–0	1–0	4–0	1–1	1–1	1–1	0–1	3–3	1–1	2–2
Durban Ladies FC	0–1	2–2		1–1	0–3	1–4	1–3	2–3	4–2	1–0	0–8	0–1	0–2	1–3	3–3	0–1
Ezemvelo	2–0	1–0	0–0		2–1	0–2	23 Aug	1–3	3–0	1–3	2–2	1–1	0–1	1–6	2–0	0–4
First Touch FC	1–2	0–1	2–1	0–0		1–2	0–2	1–1	1–0	0–1	0–2	2–0	1–1	0–1	1–1	0–2
JVW FC	3–0	3–0	2–1	3–2	3–0		2–1	3–1	5–0	1–1	2–0	5–1	2–2	1–0	1–1	1–0
Mamelodi Sundowns Ladies	2–0	1–0	7–0	2–0	4–0	2–0		6–0	8–0	5–1	4–0	1–0	1–0	3–0	2–0	1–0
Richmond United	2–2	2–0	2–2	1–0	1–1	0–2	0–1		3–2	1–2	0–1	2–0	1–2	2–0	2–3	1–1
Royal AM Women	0–0	1–2	0–0	0–1	1–2	1–3	2–0	1–0		3–1	1–3	0–1	0–0	1–2	20 Sep	0–6
TUT Matsatsantsa Ladies	2–1	0–2	1–0	3–1	0–0	1–0	0–4	1–0	5–2		0–0	5–0	0–2	2–4	0–2	1–0
TS Galaxy Queens	3–0	2–1	1–0	3–1	4–0	1–0	1–3	3–1	5–0	1–0		1–0	1–0	2–0	3–0	2–0
UCT	0–1	2–1	3–1	2–1	1–0	1–2	0–2	2–0	0–0	2–1	0–0		2–7	0–1	2–1	0–1
UFH	0–0	4–2	0–0	0–1	5–0	1–1	0–2	3–0	1–2	4–0	1–1	0–0		1–0	1–0	1–0
UJ	1–1	1–1	3–1	2–1	1–1	0–1	0–5	0–2	3–0	0–0	0–2	1–0	0–0		1–2	0–5
UP	1–0	2–0	4–0	1–1	1–0	0–4	0–5	4–0	2–3	1–3	0–2	1–1	3–2	0–2		0–0
UWC	2–0	0–1	2–0	1–1	1–0	1–1	0–0	2–0	4–0	0–1	0–0	1–1	0–2	2–0	0–0	

Updated to match(es) played on 13 December 2025. Source:
Legend: Blue = home team win; Yellow = draw; Red = away team win.

== Notes ==
The league start for most teams, 12 teams, was delayed as SAFA was still in negotiations with the sponsor in March.

== Statistics ==
=== Top Scorer ===
The 2025 season top scorers:

Rank	Player	Club	Goals
1.	Leandra Smeda	TS Galaxy Queens	22
2.	Bonolo Mokoma	JVW	18
3.	Refilwe Tholakele	Mamelodi Sundowns Ladies	13
4.	Michelle Sampson	UFH Ladies	12
5.	Nthabiseng Majiya	Mamelodi Sundowns Ladies	10
5.	Tshogofatso Motlogelwa	TUT-Matsatsantsa Ladies	10
5.	Mamokgaase Senyatsi	TUT-Matsatsantsa Ladies	10
5.	Kesha Hendricks	UFH Ladies	10
9.	Nicole Michael	TS Galaxy Queens	9
9.	Boitumelo Rabale	Mamelodi Sundowns Ladies	9

=== Most clean sheets ===
2025 clean sheets:

Rank	Player	Club	Clean sheets
1.	Dineo Magagula	TS Galaxy Queens	19
2.	Katlego Moletsane	UFH Ladies	13
2.	Andile Dlamini	Mamelodi Sundowns Ladies	13
2.	Siphesihle Dlamini	UWC Ladies	13
5.	Sedilame Bosija	Mamelodi Sundowns Ladies	11
5.	Monnye Theledi	Copperbelt Ladies	11
7.	Zinhle Ndwalane	Ezemvelo	10
7.	Kaylin Swart	JVW	10
9.	Ntambose Xhabaku	TUT Matsatsantsa	7
9.	Jessica Williams	UCT Ladies	7

=== Hat-tricks ===
Players who scored a hat-trick during the 2025 season:

Player	For	Against	Result	Date
Nonhlanhla Mthandi	Mamelodi Sundowns Ladies	Royal AM Women	8-0 (H)	23 April 2025
Kesha Hendricks	UFH Ladies	UCT Ladies	2-7 (A)	26 April 2025
Mitchell Sampson	UFH Ladies	UCT Ladies	2-7 (A)	26 April 2025
Bonolo Mokoma	JVW	Copperbelt Ladies	3-0 (H)	30 April 2025
Nthabiseng Majiya	Mamelodi Sundowns Ladies	City Lads	0-6 (A)	30 April 2025
Tshogofatso Motlogelwa	Tshwane University of Technology	University of Cape Town	5-0 (H)	10 May 2025
Shantel Ntimane	City Lads Ladies	Royal AM Women	4-3 (H)	14 June 2025
Mitchell Sampson	UFH Ladies	Copperbelt Ladies	4-2 (H)	24 September 2025

== Awards ==
The following players were rated best in the league:

Award	Winner	Club
Player of the season	(South Africa) Leandra Smeda	TS Galaxy Queens
Fan's Player of the season	(South Africa) Bonolo Mokoma	JVW
Goalkeeper of the season	(South Africa) Dineo Magagula	TS Galaxy Queens
Top goalscorer of the season	(South Africa) Leandra Smeda	TS Galaxy Queens
Midfielder of the season	(South Africa) Jessica Wade	JVW
Defender of the season	(South Africa) Karabo Dhlamini	Mamelodi Sundowns Ladies
Coach of the season	(South Africa) Godfrey Sapula	Mamelodi Sundowns Ladies
Young player of the season	(South Africa) Bonolo Mokoma	JVW
Assistant Referee of the Season	Nolitha Mhlomi	
Referee of the Season	Jean Ndebele	
