= Brooklyn Poggenpoel =

South African soccer player

Personal information
- Date of birth: 3 October 1999 (age 27)
- Place of birth: Cape Town
- Position: Midfielder

Team information
- Current team: Durban City
- Number: 18

Youth career
- Liverpool-Portland
- Anchoridge
- –2009: Parkhurst Academy
- 2009–2017: Old Mutual Academy
- 2017–2018: Bidvest Wits

Senior career*
Years	Team	Apps	(Gls)
2018–2021	Cape Umoya United	46	(1)
2021–2022	Cape Town All Stars	23	(0)
2022–2024	Chippa United	40	(1)
2024–2025	SuperSport United	19	(0)
2025–	Durban City	7	(0)

International career^{‡}
	South Africa U20	2	
2024–	South Africa	1	(0)
- * Club domestic league appearances and goals as of 4 January 2026 ‡ National team caps and goals as of 9 August 2024

Brooklyn Poggenpoel (born 3 October 1999) is a South African soccer player who plays as a midfielder for Premier Soccer League club Durban City and the South Africa national team.

== Career ==
Brooklyn Poggenpoel started playing as a small child for Liverpool-Portland in Mitchells Plain. He also spent time in Anchoridge and the Parkhurst Academy before joining the Old Mutual Academy in 2009. He joined the Bidvest Wits as a youth player from Old Mutual Academy in 2017. He also played for South Africa U20, among others in a three-nation tournament in England in 2017.

Poggenpoel started his senior career with Cape Umoya United in the National First Division. When the club sold its licence in 2021, Poggenpoel went on to Cape Town All Stars. In 2022 he was a part of a large influx of new players at Chippa United, with 16 new players arriving in the summer. Poggenpoel made his first-tier debut in August 2022 and got his breakthrough within South African soccer.

He was called up for South Africa for the 2024 COSAFA Cup, where he made his international debut against Mozambique. In the summer of 2024 he signed for SuperSport United.

== Personal life ==
He grew up in a family of sportsmen, where his grandfather Brian Poggenpoel was a rugby player and he was a nephew of the soccer-playing brothers Ed, Brian and Mark Stein on his mother's side. On his father's side he was a nephew of Shane Poggenpoel.

Among Poggenpoel's hobbies is photography, with him brandishing landscape photography on Instagram.
