= 2017 FIBA Africa Women's Clubs Champions Cup squads =

This article displays the rosters for the participating teams at the 2017 FIBA Africa Club Championship for Women.

== (Kenya) Equity Bank ==
Equity Bank – 2017 FIBA Africa Women's Clubs Champions Cup – 8th place roster
Players							Coaches
Pos	#	Nat	Name	Height	Weight	Age	Head Coach
PF	4	(Kenya)	Hilda Ndegwa			7 May 1994 (aged 23)	(Kenya) David Gatane
	5	(Kenya)	Brenda Mwaniki			5 July 1994 (aged 23)
	6	(Kenya)	Esther Butali			27 January 1981 (aged 36)	Assistant coach(es)
PG	7	(Kenya)	Betty Mjomba	1.67 m (5 ft 5 1/2 in)		30 August 1985 (aged 32)	(Kenya) Benson Ogollah
SG	8	(Kenya)	Hilda Luvandwa	1.67 m (5 ft 5 1/2 in)		18 May 1985 (aged 32)
	9	(Kenya)	Susan Odhiambo			17 March 1992 (aged 25)
	10	(Kenya)	Denise Okoth			18 September 1989 (aged 28)
	11	(Kenya)	Everlyne Odongo			11 September 1983 (aged 34)
	12	(Kenya)	Belinda Okoth	1.90 m (6 ft 3 in)		21 May 1987 (aged 30)
F/C	13	(Kenya)	Mercy Wanyama	1.85 m (6 ft 1 in)		14 January 1992 (aged 25)
F	14	(Kenya)	Gladys Alando			12 October 1984 (aged 33)
C	15	(Kenya)	Joyce Mukhule			25 August 1990 (aged 27)

== (Mozambique) Ferroviário de Maputo ==
Ferroviário de Maputo – 2017 FIBA Africa Women's Clubs Champions Cup – Silver medal roster
Players							Coaches
Pos	#	Nat	Name	Height	Weight	Age	Head Coach
G	4	(Mozambique)	Elizabeth Pereira	1.72 m (5 ft 7 1/2 in)		8 November 1991 (aged 26)	(Spain) Iñaki Garcia
F	5	(Mozambique)	Eleutéria Lhavanguane			12 November 1997 (aged 20)
SF	6	(Mozambique)	Ingvild Mucauro	1.78 m (5 ft 10 in)		12 September 1992 (aged 25)	Assistant coach(es)
F	7	(Mozambique)	Rute Muianga	1.75 m (5 ft 9 in)		6 April 1983 (aged 34)	(Mozambique) Leonel Manhique
SG	8	(Mozambique)	Ana Jaime	1.72 m (5 ft 7 1/2 in)		6 December 1990 (aged 26)
PG	9	(Mozambique)	Dulce Mabjaia	1.65 m (5 ft 5 in)		5 November 1988 (aged 29)
SG	10	(Mozambique)	Anabela Cossa	1.72 m (5 ft 7 1/2 in)		7 April 1986 (aged 31)
PG	11	(Mozambique)	Ornélia Mutombene	1.68 m (5 ft 6 in)		24 October 1990 (aged 27)
PF	12	(South Sudan)	Zeinab Chan Liol	1.93 m (6 ft 4 in)		26 April 1986 (aged 31)
C	13	(Argentina)	Gisela Vega	1.86 m (6 ft 1 in)		14 March 1982 (aged 35)
PF	14	(Mozambique)	Odélia Mafanela	1.80 m (5 ft 11 in)		14 April 1989 (aged 28)
PF	15	(Mozambique)	Deolinda Gimo	1.90 m (6 ft 3 in)		15 August 1987 (aged 30)

== (Nigeria) First Bank ==
First Bank – 2017 FIBA Africa Women's Clubs Champions Cup – Bronze medal roster
Players							Coaches
Pos	#	Nat	Name	Height	Weight	Age	Head Coach
PG	4	(Nigeria)	Bilqis Adekoya	1.68 m (5 ft 6 in)		17 May 1994 (aged 23)	(Nigeria) Peter Ahmedu
G	5	(United States)	Dominique Wilson	1.73 m (5 ft 8 in)		17 April 1994 (aged 23)
G/F	6	(Nigeria)	Deborah Nwakamma	1.81 m (5 ft 11 1/2 in)		27 April 1997 (aged 20)	Assistant coach(es)
G	7	(Nigeria)	Mary Isuambuk			1 September 1994 (aged 23)
G	8	(Nigeria)	Nkechi Akashili	1.75 m (5 ft 9 in)		22 February 1990 (aged 27)
G/F	9	(Nigeria)	Magdalene Ukato			12 February 1986 (aged 31)
F	10	(Nigeria)	Cecilia Okoye	1.85 m (6 ft 1 in)		13 September 1991 (aged 26)
F	12	(Nigeria)	Nkem Akaraiwe	1.85 m (6 ft 1 in)		22 December 1996 (aged 20)
C	13	(Ivory Coast)	Minata Fofana	1.90 m (6 ft 3 in)		22 March 1986 (aged 31)
C	14	(Nigeria)	Priscilla Udeaja	1.90 m (6 ft 3 in)		29 June 1984 (aged 33)
	15	(Nigeria)	Odion Elawure			26 May 1995 (aged 22)
C	21	(Nigeria)	Ugochi Nwaigwe	1.90 m (6 ft 3 in)		3 May 1993 (aged 24)

== (Algeria) GS Pétroliers ==
GS Pétroliers – 2017 FIBA Africa Women's Clubs Champions Cup – 6th place roster
Players							Coaches
Pos	#	Nat	Name	Height	Weight	Age	Head Coach
	4	(Algeria)	Radia Fantazi			10 August 1992 (aged 25)	(Algeria) Sofiane Boulahia
	5	(Algeria)	Nesrine Taïbi	1.87 m (6 ft 1 1/2 in)		28 June 1988 (aged 29)
	6	(Algeria)	Ikbal Chenaf	1.80 m (5 ft 11 in)		21 September 1993 (aged 24)	Assistant coach(es)
	7	(Algeria)	Samiya Boudjerima	1.69 m (5 ft 6 1/2 in)		26 April 1988 (aged 29)
	8	(Algeria)	Rachida Belaidi			28 November 1979 (aged 37)
	9	(Algeria)	Nadia Isli	1.68 m (5 ft 6 in)		14 March 1983 (aged 34)
	10	(Algeria)	Lilia Refes	1.67 m (5 ft 5 1/2 in)		11 February 1995 (aged 22)
	11	(Algeria)	Lina Saadi			13 July 1995 (aged 22)
	12	(Algeria)	Meriem Madoui			9 February 1981 (aged 36)
	13	(Algeria)	Shahnez Boushaki	1.75 m (5 ft 9 in)		22 October 1985 (aged 32)
	14	(Democratic Republic of the Congo)	Mireille Nyota			2 February 1990 (aged 27)
	15	(Democratic Republic of the Congo)	Ginette Makiese			20 April 1988 (aged 29)

== (Angola) Interclube ==
G.D. Interclube – 2017 FIBA Africa Women's Clubs Champions Cup – 4th place roster
Players							Coaches
Pos	#	Nat	Name	Height	Weight	Age	Head Coach
PG	4	(Angola)	Érica Guilherme			23 February 1996 (aged 21)	(Angola) Apolinário Paquete
C	5	(Angola)	Joana António	1.90 m (6 ft 3 in)		11 June 1997 (aged 20)
SG	6	(Angola) (United States)	Italee Lucas	1.73 m (5 ft 8 in)		12 January 1989 (aged 28)	Assistant coach(es)
PG	7	(Angola)	Merciana Fernandes	1.69 m (5 ft 6 1/2 in)		2 April 1992 (aged 25)	(Angola) Fernando Sapalo
SF	8	(Angola)	Rosemira Daniel (C)	1.72 m (5 ft 7 1/2 in)		24 October 1993 (aged 24)
F	10	(Nigeria)	Ndidi Madu	1.88 m (6 ft 2 in)		17 March 1989 (aged 28)
	11	(Angola)	Francisca Mateus			17 July 1995 (aged 22)
SF	13	(Angola)	Felizarda Jorge	1.72 m (5 ft 7 1/2 in)	78 kg (172 lb)	23 February 1985 (aged 32)
PF	15	(Angola)	Ngiendula Filipe	1.80 m (5 ft 11 in)	72 kg (159 lb)	20 May 1982 (aged 35)
C	17	(United States)	Nicole Michael			26 June 1987 (aged 30)
SG	19	(Angola)	Emanuela Mateus	1.70 m (5 ft 7 in)		19 February 1997 (aged 20)
	21	(Angola)	Eduarda Gabriel			1 April 1997 (aged 20)

== Kenya Ports Authority ==
Kenya Ports Authority – 2017 FIBA Africa Women's Clubs Champions Cup – 5th place roster
Players							Coaches
Pos	#	Nat	Name	Height	Weight	Age	Head Coach
	4	(Kenya)	Lucy Ohanga			17 April 1993 (aged 24)	(Kenya) Anthony Ojukwu
	5	(Kenya)	Lucy Machuma			18 April 1993 (aged 24)
	6	(Kenya)	Natalie Mwangale	1.65 m (5 ft 5 in)		7 September 1993 (aged 24)	Assistant coach(es)
	7	(Kenya)	Georgia Otieno	1.68 m (5 ft 6 in)		12 June 1992 (aged 25)
SG	8	(Kenya)	Anne Lumutu	1.75 m (5 ft 9 in)		4 July 1990 (aged 27)
SG	9	(Kenya)	Rita Onyango			13 June 1996 (aged 21)
PG	10	(Kenya)	Brigid Nyongesa			6 January 1983 (aged 34)
	11	(Kenya)	Lilian Adera			18 August 1997 (aged 20)
	12	(Kenya)	Berly Millungo			29 June 1994 (aged 23)
	13	(Kenya)	Betty Maithima	1.75 m (5 ft 9 in)		4 July 1992 (aged 25)
	14	(Kenya)	Selina Okumu	1.54 m (5 ft 1/2 in)		11 August 1993 (aged 24)
C	15	(Kenya)	Felmas Koranga	1.82 m (5 ft 11 1/2 in)		1 February 1996 (aged 21)

== (Democratic Republic of the Congo) Motema Pembe ==
Motema Pembe – 2017 FIBA Africa Women's Clubs Champions Cup – 7th place roster
Players							Coaches
Pos	#	Nat	Name	Height	Weight	Age	Head Coach
	4	(Democratic Republic of the Congo)	Raisa Mbokolo			28 April 1993 (aged 24)	(Democratic Republic of the Congo) Papy Kakunde
	5	(Democratic Republic of the Congo)	Hornella Kifuabala			22 October 1995 (aged 22)
	6	(Democratic Republic of the Congo)	Gabriella Madamu			20 January 1992 (aged 25)	Assistant coach(es)
	7	(Democratic Republic of the Congo)	Sephora Kayolo			20 June 1999 (aged 18)
	8	(Democratic Republic of the Congo)	Cecile Nyoka	1.77 m (5 ft 9 1/2 in)		18 September 1986 (aged 31)
	9	(Democratic Republic of the Congo)	Cipy Loota			17 September 1979 (aged 38)
	10	(Democratic Republic of the Congo)	Consollate Mwange			23 July 1985 (aged 32)
	13	(Democratic Republic of the Congo)	Joyce Kalume			10 May 1992 (aged 25)
	14	(Democratic Republic of the Congo)	Gracia Nguz			29 June 1992 (aged 25)
	15	(Democratic Republic of the Congo)	Alliance Sungulia			25 September 1999 (aged 18)

== (Angola) Primeiro de Agosto ==
Primeiro de Agosto – 2017 FIBA Africa Women's Clubs Champions Cup – Gold medal roster
Players							Coaches
Pos	#	Nat	Name	Height	Weight	Age	Head Coach
PG	4	(Angola)	Fineza Eusébio	1.78 m (5 ft 10 in)	70 kg (150 lb)	18 July 1990 (aged 27)	(Angola) Jaime Covilhã
SF	5	(Angola)	Isabel Simba		62 kg (137 lb)	19 April 1998 (aged 18)
PF	6	(Mozambique)	Leia Dongue	1.85 m (6 ft 1 in)	65 kg (143 lb)	24 May 1991 (aged 25)	Assistant coach(es)
SG	7	(Angola)	Rosa Gala	1.73 m (5 ft 8 in)	62 kg (137 lb)	17 April 1995 (aged 21)	(Angola) Jaqueline Francisco
SF	8	(Angola)	Adalberta Candeias	1.79 m (5 ft 10 1/2 in)		28 February 1998 (aged 19)
SG	9	(Angola)	Helena Viegas	1.73 m (5 ft 8 in)		27 April 1995 (aged 22)
SF	10	(Angola)	Sónia Ndoniema	1.88 m (6 ft 2 in)	77 kg (170 lb)	15 September 1985 (aged 31)
C	11	(Angola)	Luísa Tomás	1.92 m (6 ft 3 1/2 in)	82 kg (181 lb)	24 March 1983 (aged 33)
SG	12	(Angola)	Elizabeth Mateus			30 July 1993 (aged 24)
PF	13	(United States)	Alicia Devaughn	1.91 m (6 ft 3 in)		18 September 1991 (aged 26)
SF	14	(Angola)	Ana Gonçalves (C)	1.80 m (5 ft 11 in)	79 kg (174 lb)	3 January 1993 (aged 23)
PF	15	(Angola)	Avelina Peso	1.84 m (6 ft 1/2 in)		15 June 1998 (aged 19)

== (Democratic Republic of the Congo) Vita Club ==
Vita Club – 2017 FIBA Africa Women's Clubs Champions Cup – 9th place roster
Players							Coaches
Pos	#	Nat	Name	Height	Weight	Age	Head Coach
	4	(Democratic Republic of the Congo)	Christelle Nkwangu			28 October 1996 (aged 21)	(Democratic Republic of the Congo) Papy Kiembe
	5	(Democratic Republic of the Congo)	Marlène Matokio			3 May 1995 (aged 22)
	6	(Democratic Republic of the Congo)	Naura Balongya			16 November 1994 (aged 23)	Assistant coach(es)
	8	(Democratic Republic of the Congo)	La Mama Maweja			26 July 1997 (aged 20)	(Democratic Republic of the Congo) Agnes Mbudi
	9	(Democratic Republic of the Congo)	Natacha Teba			28 May 1992 (aged 25)
	10	(Democratic Republic of the Congo)	Ortice Haongi			10 October 1987 (aged 30)
	11	(Democratic Republic of the Congo)	Evodie Londa			20 May 1995 (aged 22)
	12	(Democratic Republic of the Congo)	Mariana Muadi			4 December 1996 (aged 20)
	13	(Democratic Republic of the Congo)	Jeanine Kalombo			16 February 1984 (aged 33)
	14	(Democratic Republic of the Congo)	Nathalie Ngokas			8 August 1991 (aged 26)
	15	(Democratic Republic of the Congo)	Kibinda Ndangi			26 March 1978 (aged 39)

== See also ==
- 2017 FIBA Africa Championship for Women squads
