= Fikile Sithole =

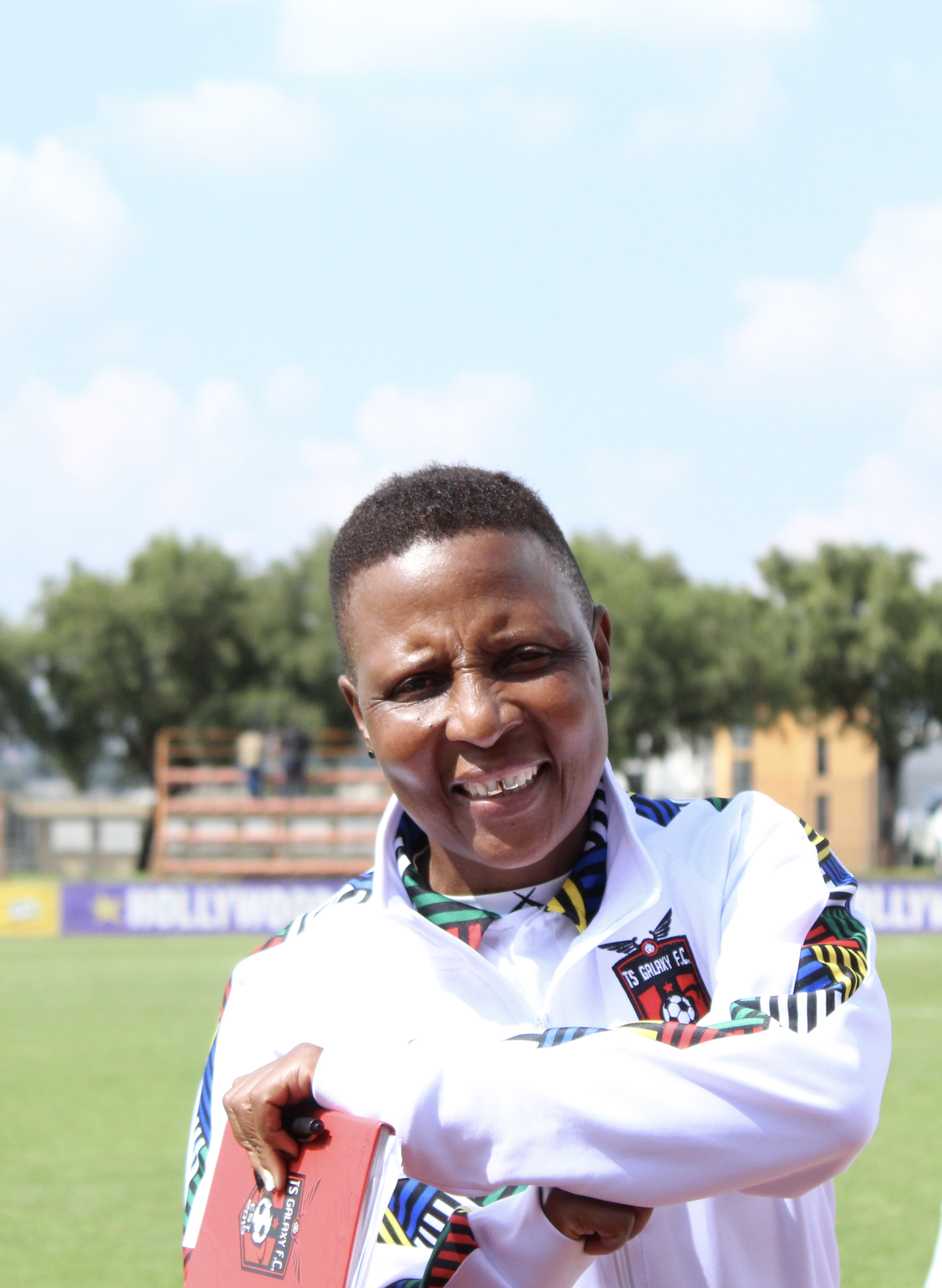
- Sithole in 2025

Personal information
- Full name: Fikile Sithole
- Date of birth: 28 November
- Place of birth: Johannesburg, South Africa
- Position: Midfielder

Team information
- Current team: TS Galaxy Queens (assistant coach)

Senior career*
Years	Team	Apps	(Gls)
1989–1995	Soweto Ladies FC		
1995–1996	Öxabäcks IF		
1996–2001	Soweto Ladies FC		

International career
1993–1999	South Africa		

Managerial career
- 2023-: TS Galaxy Queens (assistant coach)
- * Club domestic league appearances and goals

Fikile Sithole is a South African soccer manager and former player. She is one of the founding players of the South Africa women's national team in 1993 and former captain of the team.

She was awarded seventh best African woman player of the XXth century and was also chosen in the African team of the XXth century by the Confederation of African Football (CAF) and the International Federation of Football History & Statistics (IFFHS)

== Managerial career ==
In 2023 she was announced the assistant coach of SAFA Women's League side TS Galaxy Queens.
