= 2023 Sasol Women's League =

Sasol Women's League
- Season: 2023
- Dates: March 2023- September 2023
- Champions: University of Fort Hare
- Promoted: University of Fort Hare; Lindelani Ladies
- Best Player: Nomfundo Xulu
- Top goalscorer: Lerato Ruele
- Best goalkeeper: Thabisa Baleni

The 2023 Sasol Women's League was the 14th season of the Sasol Women's League, the 3rd season used as a promotion system to the SAFA Women's League. The Sasol Women's League is the second tier of South Africa women's football.

The 2023 season concluded with University of Fort Hare winning the Sasol Women's National Playoffs, while Lindelani Ladies were runners-up.

== Provincial winners ==
Team	Provincial League
University of Fort Hare	Eastern Cape Sasol League
Ixias Ladies	Free State Sasol League
Croesus Ladies	Gauteng Sasol League
Lindelani Ladies	KwaZulu Natal Sasol League
Ramatlaohle Ladies	Limpopo Sasol League
Sasol Juventus	Mpumalanga Sasol League
Royal Wizards	Northern Cape Sasol League
Royal Queens	North West Sasol League
University of Cape Town	Western Cape Sasol League

== Provincial logs ==
=== Eastern Cape ===
Stream A

Pos	Team	Pld	W	D	L	GF	GA	GD	Pts	Qualification or relegation
1	UFH Ladies	16	15	1	0	54	8	+46	46	Playoffs
2	Sophakama Ladies	16	14	0	2	75	9	+66	42	
3	Nav Galaxy Ladies	16	9	1	6	31	20	+11	28	
4	Volcano Ladies	16	7	2	7	37	34	+3	23	
5	Bay Stars Ladies	16	6	2	8	31	36	−5	20	
6	Golden Stars Ladies Football Development	16	5	3	8	28	49	−21	18	
7	MADIBAZ Football	16	5	1	10	23	51	−28	16	
8	Kilimanjaro Stars	16	3	0	13	22	57	−35	9	
9	Phoenix Birds Ladies	16	3	0	13	19	56	−37	9	

Stream B

Pos	Team	Pld	W	D	L	GF	GA	GD	Pts	Qualification or relegation
1	Executive Ladies	16	14	1	1	54	11	+43	43	Playoffs
2	Ayakha Stars Ladies	16	13	1	2	43	9	+34	40	
3	Red Roses Ladies	16	11	1	4	24	10	+14	34	
4	Eluhewini Ladies	16	6	3	7	25	25	0	21	
5	Cumakala	16	6	2	8	28	33	−5	20	
6	Coastal United Ladies	16	6	2	8	26	32	−6	20	
7	Eastern Rangers FC	16	6	0	10	27	34	−7	18	
8	UWS Mthatha Campus Ladies	16	4	0	12	22	41	−19	12	
9	Amaqilo Birds	16	1	0	15	2	56	−54	3	

=== Free State ===
Stream A

Pos	Team	Pld	W	D	L	GF	GA	GD	Pts	Qualification or relegation
1	Ixias Ladies	12	12	0	0	79	4	+75	36	Playoffs
2	Central University of FS	12	10	0	2	79	5	+74	30	
3	Inter Madrid Academy	12	5	3	4	20	19	+1	18	
4	TTKay FC	12	5	2	5	22	26	−4	17	
5	De Jaguar FC	12	4	1	7	21	33	−12	13	
6	Matsimaholo Ladies	12	3	0	9	14	62	−48	9	
7	Black Urban FC	0	0	0	0	0	0	0	0	
8	Molefe Khalinkomo FC	12	0	0	12	4	80	−76	0	

Stream B

Pos	Team	Pld	W	D	L	GF	GA	GD	Pts	Qualification or relegation
1	Kovsies Ladies	14	14	0	0	124	4	+120	42	Playoffs
2	Matheo Ladies FC	14	10	1	3	64	16	+48	31	
3	Clever Girl FC	14	8	1	5	38	19	+19	25	
4	Grassland Ladies FC	14	7	3	4	31	32	−1	24	
5	UGU FC	14	4	2	8	41	29	+12	14	
6	Dikonyela FC	14	4	1	9	46	68	−22	13	
7	Napoli FC	13	4	0	9	25	42	−17	12	
8	FC Kerlis	13	0	0	13	5	164	−159	0	

=== Gauteng ===
Stream A

Pos	Team	Pld	W	D	L	GF	GA	GD	Pts	Qualification or relegation
1	Croesus Ladies	14	12	1	1	65	13	+52	37	Playoffs
2	Blue Raycon	14	12	0	2	57	14	+43	36	
3	Mathaithai	14	7	0	7	30	37	−7	21	
4	Diepkloof Ladies	14	6	2	6	24	30	−6	20	
5	Vikings Ladies	14	5	2	7	17	21	−4	17	
6	North West University Vaal	14	5	1	8	14	28	−14	16	
7	JVW FC	14	3	3	8	30	36	−6	12	
8	Kathorus United	14	1	1	12	17	75	−58	4	

Stream B

Pos	Team	Pld	W	D	L	GF	GA	GD	Pts	Qualification or relegation
1	Springs Home Sweepers	14	13	0	1	42	12	+30	39	Playoffs
2	University of Johannesburg FC	14	9	0	5	29	22	+7	27	
3	Hallelujah Zebra Force	14	7	2	5	22	19	+3	23	
4	Wits Ladies	14	7	1	6	31	21	+10	22	
5	Nicko Taurus FA	14	7	1	6	24	21	+3	22	
6	Blue Bird Ladies Football Academy	14	5	0	9	19	35	−16	15	
7	Kempton Park FC	14	4	1	9	23	37	−14	13	
8	Luso Africa	14	1	1	12	14	37	−23	4	

=== Kwazulu Natal ===
Stream A

Pos	Team	Pld	W	D	L	GF	GA	GD	Pts	Qualification or relegation
1	Newcastle Ladies	16	13	1	2	64	8	+56	40	Playoffs
2	Sunflower WFC	16	12	2	2	63	13	+50	38	
3	PSG Amabhaca Ladies	16	11	1	4	39	17	+22	34	
4	Dlala Ntombazane	15	8	2	5	14	32	−18	26	
5	DUT Midlands	16	6	2	8	19	42	−23	20	
6	DUT Coastal WFC	15	5	2	8	20	34	−14	17	
7	UKZN Ladies	15	5	1	9	16	32	−16	16	
8	Umlazi Arsenal	16	3	0	13	14	56	−42	9	
9	Ayaphila	15	1	0	14	5	56	−51	3	

Stream B

Pos	Team	Pld	W	D	L	GF	GA	GD	Pts	Qualification or relegation
1	Lindelani Ladies	16	14	2	0	63	3	+60	44	Playoffs
2	UniZulu Ladies	16	11	0	5	34	13	+21	33	
3	Westvill United FC	16	8	3	5	30	22	+8	27	
4	Shooting Star	16	8	3	5	26	16	+10	27	
5	Makhanisi FC	16	7	4	5	37	0	+37	25	
6	Darnall FC	16	5	2	9	16	25	−9	17	
7	White City	15	1	5	9	17	37	−20	8	
8	Sapphire Ladies FC	16	3	1	12	14	50	−36	10	
9	Young Fighters	16	3	0	13	19	63	−44	9	

=== Limpopo ===
Stream A

Pos	Team	Pld	W	D	L	GF	GA	GD	Pts	Qualification or relegation
1	Ramatlaohle Ladies FC	14	13	0	1	62	5	+57	39	Playoffs
2	Kanatla Ladies	14	12	1	1	52	3	+49	37	
3	Mandebele Happy Fighters Ladies	14	8	3	3	27	18	+9	27	
4	University of Limpopo	13	5	1	7	22	27	−5	16	
5	Seven Stars Ladies	13	2	5	6	12	23	−11	11	
6	FC 50 Stars United	14	3	1	10	18	37	−19	10	
7	Schoonoord Chiefs Ladies	14	3	1	10	14	47	−33	10	
8	Marumo Gallants FC	14	2	2	10	16	61	−45	8	

Stream B

Pos	Team	Pld	W	D	L	GF	GA	GD	Pts	Qualification or relegation
1	Two For Joy Ladies FC	17	14	2	1	73	8	+65	44	Playoffs
2	Sisters	18	14	2	2	68	11	+57	44	
3	Rodadau FC	18	14	2	2	62	9	+53	44	
4	Lacoste Morning Stars FC	18	9	2	7	45	19	+26	29	
5	Tshandama Youung Stars	18	8	3	7	32	26	+6	27	
6	Sealene Ladies	17	8	1	8	23	30	−7	25	
7	Real Mighty Ladies	18	5	0	13	18	49	−31	15	
8	Masakona Liberty Experience	18	3	3	12	13	44	−31	12	
9	Merwe United Ladies FC	18	3	2	13	13	61	−48	11	
10	Phomolong Ladies	18	2	1	15	10	100	−90	7	

=== Mpumalanga ===
Steam A

Pos	Team	Pld	W	D	L	GF	GA	GD	Pts	RQ
1	Sasol Juventus FC	16	14	2	0	58	10	+48	44	Playoffs
2	Two Touch FC	16	10	5	1	57	16	+41	35	
3	Slindile Ladies	16	9	0	7	26	26	0	27	
4	Leandra United FC	16	7	5	4	53	31	+22	26	
5	Storm Ladies	16	5	4	7	23	23	0	19	
6	Botleng United Ladies	16	5	3	8	33	34	−1	18	
7	Sasol Thistle Grove Ladies	16	4	3	9	29	48	−19	15	
8	Emba- Milan FC	16	4	0	12	23	56	−33	12	
9	Losta Stars FC	16	3	0	13	18	76	−58	9	

Steam B

== National playoffs ==
The Sasol League National Championship took place in Bloemfontein, in Dr. Molemela Stadium. Nine teams from nine provinces who won their provincial league participated to be crowded champions and gain promotion to SAFA Women's League. The Sasol League National Championship was held from 17 to 22 October.
