= Nicole Michael =

South African professional soccer player (born 2001)

Personal information
- Full name: Nicole Lauren Michael
- Date of birth: 17 January 2001 (age 25)
- Place of birth: Riverlea, Gauteng, South Africa
- Position: Forward

Team information
- Current team: TS Galaxy Queens
- Number: 11

Youth career
- 2021: Bloemfontein Celtic Ladies F.C.

Senior career*
Years	Team	Apps	(Gls)
2022	Royal AM		
2023–	TS Galaxy Queens		

International career
2017	South Africa U17		
2019	South Africa U20		
2023–	South Africa		(1)
- * Club domestic league appearances and goals

Nicole Lauren Michael (born 17 January 2001) is a South African professional soccer player who plays as a forward for SAFA Women's League club TS Galaxy Queens and the South Africa women's national team.

== Playing career ==
Michael previously played for Bloemfontein Celtics Ladies and Royal AM.

In 2023, she joined Mpumalanga based club TS Galaxy Queens.

=== International career ===
In 2017, she was selected in the Bantwana squad for the FIFA U/17 Women's World Cup Qualifiers. She was part of the Basetsana squad that took part in the Chinese U-19 International Women's Tournament in 2019.

On 4 December 2023, she scored her first senior international goal against Burkina Faso during the 2024 Women's Africa Cup of nations qualifiers.

=== International goals ===
Scores and results list South Africa's goal tally first

No.	Date	Venue	Opponent	Score	Result	Competition
1	4 December 2023	Lucas Moripe Stadium, Pretoria, South Africa	Burkina Faso	2-0	2-0	2024 Women's Africa Cup of nations qualifiers
