= Dineo Magagula =

South African soccer player (born 1994)

Personal information
- Date of birth: 14 October 1994 (age 32)
- Place of birth: Sephaku, Limpopo, South Africa
- Position: Goalkeeper

Team information
- Current team: TS Galaxy Queens
- Number: 1

Youth career
- –: Soweto Ladies
- –: Soweto Fabulous

Senior career*
Years	Team	Apps	(Gls)
–2022	University of Johannesburg		
2022–	TS Galaxy Queens		

International career
2022–	South Africa		
Medal record
Representing South Africa
COSAFA Women's Championship
Silver medal – second place	2022 South Africa
- * Club domestic league appearances and goals

Dineo Magagula (born 14 October 1994) is a South African soccer player who plays as a goalkeeper for SAFA Women's League side TS Galaxy Queens and the South Africa women's national team.

Magagula won the 2025 SAFA Women's League goalkeeper of the season.

== Club career ==
=== University of Johannesburg ===
In 2019, she assisted the side in retaining their 2018 University Sports South Africa (USSA) title. Later that year, she was added to Team SA for the World Student Games held in Naples, Italy.

=== TS Galaxy Queens ===
She joined SAFA Women's League side TS Galaxy Queens ahead of the 2023 season. She won 2025 SAFA Women's League goalkeeper of the season after keeping 19 clean sheets in 29 matches for the club.

== International career ==
Magagula competed for the South Africa women's national team at the 2022 COSAFA Women's Championship when they finished as runners-up to Zambia.

== Personal life ==
Magagula completed a Diploma in Transport Management from the University of Johannesburg in 2021.

== Honours ==
South Africa

- COSAFA Women's Championship: Runners-up: 2022

University of Johannesburg

- University Sports South Africa (USSA): 2018, 2019

TS Galaxy Queens

- SAFA Women's League third place: 2025

Individual

- SAFA Women's League goalkeeper of the season: 2025
