= University of Cape Town Women's F.C. =

Women's soccer club in South Africa

UCT Ladies F.C.
- Full name: University of Cape Town Women's Football Club
- Nickname: Ikey Warriors
- Ground: UCT Kopano Astroturf
- Capacity: 500
- Coordinates: 33°57′20″S 18°28′27″E
- Owner: University of Cape Town
- League: Sasol Women's League
- 2025: 10th
- Website: sport.uct.ac.za/football

The University of Cape Town Women's Football Club, also known as UCT Ladies F.C., is the football club representing the University of Cape Town based in Cape Town, Western Cape. The team competes in the Sasol Women's League, the second tier women's football league in South Africa.

== History ==
The club won the Cape Town Women's Regional League in 2017 and were promoted to the Sasol Women's League.

=== Sasol Women's League/Sasol League National Championship ===
They won the 2023 Western Cape Sasol League and qualified for the 2023 Sasol League National Championship where they finished in 5th place.

They defended their Sasol title in 2024 and qualified for the 2024 Sasol League National Championship where they finished as runners-up and qualified for the SAFA Women's League after losing 2-0 to Ezemvelo in the final.

=== SAFA Women's League ===
They made their SAFA Women's League debut on 2 March 2025 against the University of Johannesburg. They lost the match 1-0.

== Honours ==
- Sasol League National Championship: Runners-up: 2024
- Western Cape Sasol Women's League: 2023, 2024
- Cape Town Women's Regional League: 2017
- Coke Cup: 2019, 2022
