= 2021 Sasol League National Championship =

Tournament details
- Country: South Africa
- City: Umlazi
- Venue: King Zwelithini Stadium
- Dates: 8 February 2022 - 13 February 2022
- Teams: 9

Final positions
- Champions: Vasco Da Gama (1st title)
- Runners-up: City Lads
- Third place: Lindelani Ladies
- Fourth place: Croesus Ladies

Tournament statistics
- Top goal scorer: Miche Minnies (6 goals)

Awards
- Best player: Miche Minnies
- Best young player: Sbongakonke Mzobe
- Best goalkeeper: Jessica Williams

The 2021 Sasol League National Championship was the 12th edition of the Sasol League National Championship since it was formed in 2009. It was held at King Zwelithini Stadium in Umlazi.

In the first semi-final Vasco Da Gama beat Croesus Ladies 4-3 via penalties after the match ended in a 1-1 draw. In the second semi-final, Nandipha Booi scored a hattrick to give City Lads a 3-2 win over Lindelani Ladies.

The highest scoring and biggest victory was a 12-3 win for City Lads against Royal Wizards.

== Participating teams ==
All nine teams qualified through winning their provincial leagues.

Team	Provincial League
City Lads	Eastern Cape Sasol League
Ixias Ladies	Free State Sasol League
Croesus Ladies	Gauteng Sasol League
Lindelani Ladies	KwaZulu Natal Sasol League
Copperbelt Ladies	Limpopo Sasol League
TS Galaxy Queens	Mpumalanga Sasol League
Royal Wizards	Northern Cape Sasol League
Tswelelang De’ Scorpion	North West Sasol League
Vasco Da Gama	Western Cape Sasol League

== Semi-Final ==
11 February

Lindelani Ladies	2–3	City Lads

King Zwelithini Stadium, Kimberly
11 February

Vasco Da Gama	1–1	Croesus Ladies
Penalties
	4-3

King Zwelithini Stadium, Kimberly

== Final ==
13 February

Vasco Da Gama	4–3	City Lads

King Zwelithini Stadium, Kimberly

== Final standings ==
Rank	Team	Prize money
1	Vasco Da Gama	R200 000
2	City Lads	R100 000
3	Lindelani Ladies	R60 000
4	Croesus Ladies	R40 000
5	Ixias Ladies	R30 000
6	TS Galaxy Queens	R25 000
7	Tswelelang De’Scorpion	R20 000
8	Copperbelt Ladies	R15 000
9	Royal Wizards	R10 000

== Awards ==
The following were rated best in the tournament:

Award	Winner	Club
Player of the Tournament	Miche Minnies	Vasco Da Gama
Top goalscorer of the Tournament	Miche Minnies	Vasco Da Gama
Best goalkeeper	Jessica Williams	Vasco Da Gama
Young promising player	Sbongakonke Mzobe	Lindelani Ladies
Referee of the Tournament	Rebecca Molefe	
Assistant Referee of the Tournament	Nomthetho Mbatsha	
