= Karabo Dhlamini =

South African soccer player (born 2001)

- Dhlamini in 2026

Personal information
- Full name: Karabo Angel Dhlamini
- Date of birth: 18 September 2001 (age 25)
- Place of birth: Tembisa, Gauteng, South Africa
- Height: 1.64 m (5 ft 5 in)
- Position: Defender

Team information
- Current team: Mamelodi Sundowns
- Number: 25

Youth career
- 2015–2020: Mamelodi Sundowns Academy

College career
Years	Team	Apps	(Gls)
2021	UNOH Racers	8	(0)
2021–2022	Oakland Golden Grizzlies	37	(4)

Senior career*
Years	Team	Apps	(Gls)
2023–	Mamelodi Sundowns		

International career^{‡}
2018	South Africa U17	3	(0)
2019–	South Africa	50	(1)
Medal record
Representing South Africa
Women's Africa Cup of Nations
First place	2022 Morocco
- * Club domestic league appearances and goals ‡ National team caps and goals as of 20 July 2023 (prior the 2023 FIFA Women's World Cup)

Karabo Angel ‘Cream’ Dhlamini (born 18 September 2001) is a South African soccer player who plays as a defender for SAFA Women's League club Mamelodi Sundowns and the South Africa women's national team.

She was named in the group stage best XI at the 2024 CAF Women's Champions League. She won the inaugural defender of the season award at the 2025 SAFA Women's League awards awards.

== Playing career ==
In 2021, she was a student at Oakland University, representing Oakland Golden Grizzlies women's soccer on a scholarship.

=== Mamelodi Sundowns Ladies ===
In 2023, she joined SAFA Women's League side Mamelodi Sundowns Ladies.

She was part of the squad that won the 2023 COSAFA Women's Champions League, the 2023 CAF Women's Champions League and the 2023 SAFA Women's League titles.

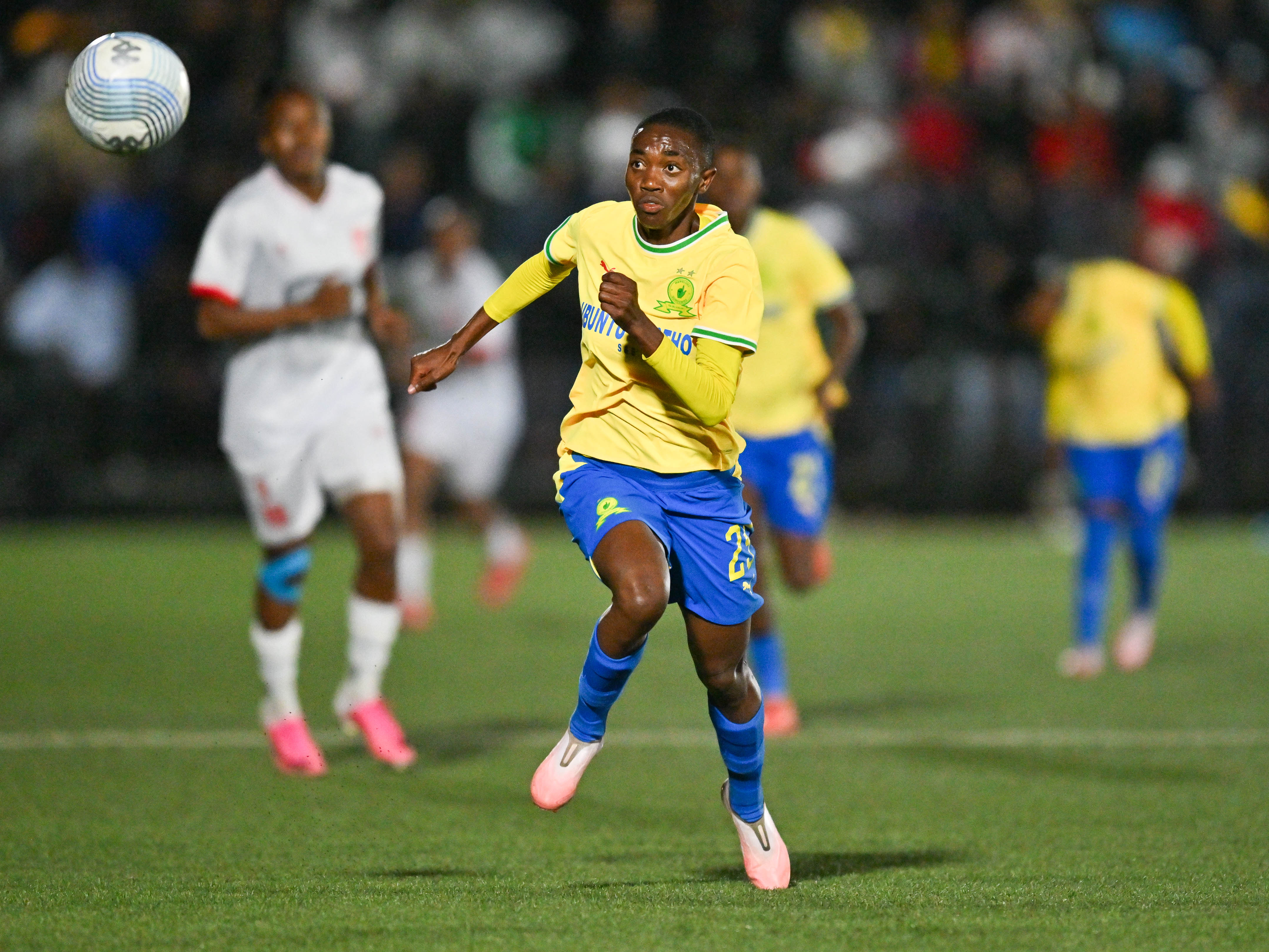
Dhlamini during the 2026 CAF Women's Champions League COSAFA Qualifiers semi-final against Gaborone United Ladies S.C.

Dhlamini received the player of the tournament award at the 2026 CAF Women's Champions League COSAFA Qualifiers

She was named in the group stage best XI at the 2024 CAF Women's Champions League and named in the 2024 CAF Team of the Year. She was named the defender of the season at the 2025 SAFA Women's League awards. Dhlamini helped Sundowns Ladies win their third regional title in the 2026 COSAFA Women's Champions League where she was named the best player.

== International career ==
Dhlamini represented South Africa at the 2018 FIFA U-17 Women's World Cup in Uruguay where she was named as captain of the team. She made her senior debut on 19 January 2019 in a 1–2 friendly loss to the Netherlands at the age of 17 before going on to be called as the youngest member of South Africa's squad for the 2019 FIFA Women's World Cup.

At the 2020 COSAFA Women's Championship, Dhlamini earned her first medal with the senior national team as South Africa emerged as champions. She made four appearances during the tournament, starting throughout the knockout rounds. It was during this competition that Dhlamini scored her first senior international goal during a 2-0 win over Angola.

In July 2022, Dhlamini was a member of the South Africa squad which emerged victorious at the 2022 Africa Women's Cup of Nations and made five appearances at the competition. She was named in the women's XI at the CAF awards 2024 team of the year. She was named the tournament best XI at the 2024 Women's Africa Cup of Nations.

She made her 50th appearance for the national team on 17 April 2026 against Algeria.

== Honours ==
South Africa

- Women's Africa Cup of Nations: 2022
- COSAFA Women's Championship: 2020

Mamelodi Sundowns Ladies

- CAF Women's Champions League: 2023
- COSAFA Women's Champions League: 2023, 2026
- SAFA Women's League: 2023, 2024, 2025

Individual

- 2024 CAF Women's Champions League:Group Stage Best XI
- 2024 Women's Africa Cup of Nations:Tournament Best XI
- CAF Team of the Year Women's XI: 2024
- 2025 SAFA Women's League: Defender of the Season
- 2026 COSAFA Women's Champions League: Player of the tournament

Sporting positions
Preceded by (Sweden) Filippa Struxsjo (Aquinas College)	WHAC Newcomer of the Year; 2020	Succeeded by (United States) Emmy Rodger (Lourdes University)
