= Nomvula Kgoale =

South African soccer player

Personal information
- Full name: Mapula Nomvula Kgoale
- Date of birth: 20 November 1995 (age 30)
- Place of birth: Zebediela, South Africa
- Height: 1.63 m (5 ft 4 in)
- Positions: Defender; midfielder

Team information
- Current team: TS Galaxy Queens
- Number: 14

Youth career
- Tuks Sports High School

College career
Years	Team	Apps	(Gls)
2014	Lindsey Wilson Blue Raiders	14	(3)
2015	Tyler Apaches		
2016–2018	Louisiana Tech Lady Techsters	54	(10)

Senior career*
Years	Team	Apps	(Gls)
- University of the Western Cape
2021	Cacereño	4	(0)
2022	CD Parquesol	13	(1)
2023–	TS Galaxy Queens		

International career^{‡}
2010	South Africa U17	3	(0)
- South Africa U20
2019–	South Africa	1	(0)
Medal record
Representing South Africa
Women's Africa Cup of Nations
First place	2022 Morocco
- * Club domestic league appearances and goals as of 22 May 2022 ‡ National team caps and goals as of 12 May 2019

Mapula Nomvula "Nomi" Kgoale (born 20 November 1995) is a South African soccer player who plays as a defender for SAFA Women's League club TS Galaxy Queens and the South Africa women's national team.

== College career ==
Kgoale attended the Lindsey Wilson College, the Tyler Junior College and the Louisiana Tech University, both in the United States.

== International career ==
Kgoale represented South Africa at the 2010 FIFA U-17 Women's World Cup. She made her senior debut on 12 May 2019 in a 0–3 friendly loss to the United States.

== Club career ==
Kgoale previously played for Spanish club CD Parquesol. She currently plays for TS Galaxy Queens.

== Honours ==
South Africa

- Women's Africa Cup of Nations: 2022
