= University of the Free State Women's F.C. =

Kovsie Ladies F.C.
- Full name: University of the Free State Women's Football Club
- Ground: Shimla Park
- Coordinates: 29.1085° S, 26.1725° E
- Owner: University of the Free State
- Head Coach: (South Africa) Jabulile Baloyi
- League: Sasol Women's League
- 2024: 1st (Free State Stream B)
- Website: https://www.ufs.ac.za/kovsiesport

The University of the Free State Women's Football Club, also knowns as Kovsie Ladies F.C., is the football club representing the University of the Free State based in Bloemfontein, Free State. The team competes in the Sasol Women's League, the second tier women's football league in South Africa.

== History ==
The team finished third in the Free State Sasol Women's League in 2019. In 2021, they lost 2-1 to Ixias Ladies in the final for the provincial playoffs. They were fourth in the 2022 season after finishing second in their stream and losing the third/fourth play off match.

In 2023 they were second in the Free State Sasol Women's League, losing 1-0 to Ixias Ladies in the final playoff.

In 2024, they won their maiden Free State Sasol Women's League. They qualified for the 2024 Sasol League National Championship where finished as semi-finalist after a 4-0 loss to the University of Cape Town from the Western Cape.

== Honours ==
- Free State Sasol Women's League: 2024, runners-up: 2021, 2023
