= Zamandosi Cele =

South African soccer player (born 1990)

Personal information
- Full name: Zamandosi Cele Nene
- Date of birth: 26 December 1990 (age 35)
- Place of birth: Pietermaritzburg, South Africa
- Position: Defender

Team information
- Current team: Ezemvelo

Senior career*
Years	Team	Apps	(Gls)
2011–2020	Durban Ladies		
2023–	Ezemvelo		

International career
2012–	South Africa	25	(0)
Medal record
Representing South Africa
African Women's Championship
Second place	2012 Equatorial Guinea
- * Club domestic league appearances and goals as of 11 August 2014

Zamandosi Nene (née Cele; born 26 December 1990) is a South African soccer player who plays as a defender for Sasol Women's League side Ezemvelo and the South Africa women's national team.

She represented the South Africa national team at the 2012 London Olympics.

== Club career ==
Nene guided newly formed Ezemvelo to the KZN Sasol Women's League in their maiden season and the 2024 Sasol League National Championship title. She was named the best player at the national championship.

== International career ==
Cele competed for the South Africa women's national soccer team at the 2012 London Olympics and the 2012 African Women's Championship where they finished as runner's up.

== Honours ==
- African Women's Championship: runner-up 2012
- Sasol League National Championship: 2024

Individual

- Sasol League National Championship: Best Player: 2024
