= Leandra Smeda =

South African soccer player (born 1989)

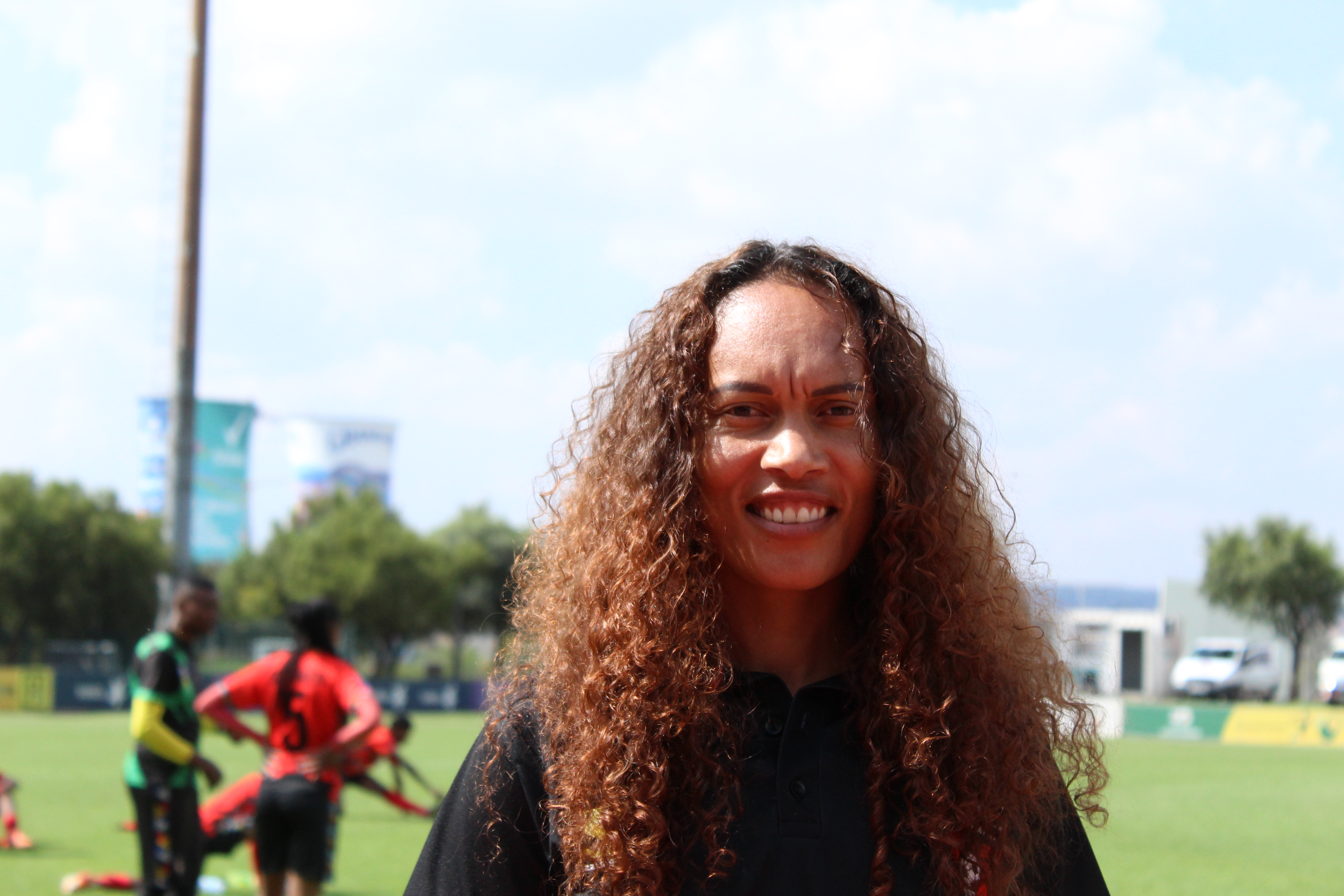
- Smeda in 2025

Personal information
- Full name: Leandra Wiloma Smeda
- Date of birth: 22 July 1989 (age 37)
- Place of birth: Velddrif, South Africa
- Height: 1.63 m (5 ft 4 in)
- Position: Winger

Team information
- Current team: TS Galaxy Queens
- Number: 22

Senior career*
Years	Team	Apps	(Gls)
2010	Ambassadors Ladies		
2011–2012	Cape Town Roses		
2013–2017	University of the Western Cape	0	(0)
2018	Gintra Universitetas	2	(1)
2019	Vittsjö GIK	10	(0)
2020	Famalicão	3	(0)
2021	University of Western Cape		
2022	Dux Logroño	25	(0)
2023–2024	RCD Espanyol	3	(0)
2025–	TS Galaxy Queens	28	(22)

International career
2012–	South Africa	100	(22)
- * Club domestic league appearances and goals as of 1 February 2020

Leandra Wiloma Smeda (pronounced Schmeda; born 22 July 1989) is a South African soccer player who plays as a winger for TS Galaxy Queens and the South Africa women's national team.

On 10 November 2019, Smeda played her 100th match for South Africa against Japan. She was the 2025 SAFA Women's League player of the season and top scorer.

== Career ==
Smeda played for UWC Ladies in the Western Cape Sasol League before leaving the university in 2017.

In 2018 she joined A Lyga side FC Gintra.

In 2019 she joined Damallsvenskan side Vittsjö GIK.

In 2020 she joined Campeonato Nacional Feminino side F.C. Famalicão.

=== TS Galaxy Queens ===
She joined SAFA Women's League side TS Galaxy Queens at the start of the 2025 season. Smeda was voted the player of the season at the 2025 SAFA Women's League awards and was also the top goal scorer scoring 22 goals in 28 appearances in her debut season for the club.

== International career ==
Smeda capped 100 times for the South Africa women's national team. Her 100th match was against Japan. She played in the 2019 FIFA Women's World Cup when the women's national team made their world cup debut.

== International goals ==
No.	Date	Venue	Opponent	Score	Result	Competition
1.	23 May 2014	Stade Said Mohamed Cheikh, Mitsamiouli, Comoros	Comoros	3–0	13–0	2014 African Women's Championship qualification
2.	23 May 2014	Stade Said Mohamed Cheikh, Mitsamiouli, Comoros	Comoros	4–0	13–0	2014 African Women's Championship qualification
3.	23 May 2014	Stade Said Mohamed Cheikh, Mitsamiouli, Comoros	Comoros	7–0	13–0	2014 African Women's Championship qualification
4.	23 May 2014	Stade Said Mohamed Cheikh, Mitsamiouli, Comoros	Comoros	8–0	13–0	2014 African Women's Championship qualification
5.	7 September 2015	Stade Alphonse Massemba-Débat, Brazzaville, Congo	Cameroon	1–0	1–1	2015 African Games
6.	14 September 2017	Luveve Stadium, Bulawayo, Zimbabwe	Lesotho	1–0	3–0	2017 COSAFA Women's Championship
6.	21 September 2017	Barbourfields Stadium, Bulawayo, Zimbabwe	Zambia	1–3	3–3 (5–3 p)	2017 COSAFA Women's Championship
7.	21 September 2017	Barbourfields Stadium, Bulawayo, Zimbabwe	Zambia	2–3	3–3 (5–3 p)	2017 COSAFA Women's Championship
8.	24 September 2017	Barbourfields Stadium, Bulawayo, Zimbabwe	Zimbabwe	2–1	2–1	2017 COSAFA Women's Championship
9.	27 February 2019	GSZ Stadium, Larnaca, Cyprus	Finland	1–1	2–2	2019 Cyprus Women's Cup

== Honours ==
TS Galaxy Queens

- SAFA Women's League third place: 2025

Individual

- SAFA Women's League player of the season: 2025
- SAFA Women's League top scorer: 2025
