= Vakhegula Vakhegula F.C. =

Vakhegula Vakhegula Football Club is a football club based in South Africa.

== History ==
Vakhegula Vakhegula was founded in 2005. One of the founding members of Vakhegula Vakhegula FC died in 2025. 67.
