= 2024 Sasol League National Championship =

Tournament details
- Country: South Africa
- City: Knysna
- Venue: Loerie Park Sports Stadium
- Date: 14 - 20 October 2024
- Teams: 9

Final positions
- Champions: Ezemvelo
- Runners-up: University of Cape Town
- Semifinalists: Ramatlaohle; University of the Free State

Tournament statistics
- Matches played: 12
- Goals scored: 39 (3.25 per match)
- Top goal scorer(s): Matshwantsho Dlamini (3 goals)

Awards
- Best player: Zamandosi Nene
- Best young player: Mavis Maiacane
- Best goalkeeper: Kaydee Windvogel

The 2024 Sasol League National Championship was the 15th edition of Sasol League National Championship since it was formed in 2009. It was held at Loerie Park Sports Stadium in Knysna.

Ezemvelo were crowned Sasol League National Champions after defeating the University of Cape Town 2-0 in the final. Both teams secured promotion to the SAFA Women's League.

== Participating teams ==
Team	Provincial League
Sophakama Ladies	Eastern Cape Sasol League
University of the Free State	Free State Sasol League
FC Raycon Ladies	Gauteng Sasol League
Ezemvelo	KwaZulu Natal Sasol League
Ramatlaohle Ladies	Limpopo Sasol League
Super Strikers Ladies	Mpumalanga Sasol League
Royal Wizards	Northern Cape Sasol League
North West University	North West Sasol League
University of Cape Town	Western Cape Sasol League

== Draw ==
The draw for the 2024 championship took place on 26 September 2024. The nine teams were divided into the following three groups:

Group A	Group B	Group C
Ramatlaohle Ladies; Super Strikers Ladies; RC Raycon Ladies	University of the Free State; North West University; Royal Wizards	University of Cape Town (hosts); Sophakama Ladies; Ezemvelo

== Group stages ==
Tiebreakers

Teams are ranked according to points (3 points for a win, 1 point for a draw, 0 points for a loss), and if tied on points, the following tiebreaking criteria are applied, in the order given, to determine the rankings.

1. Points in head-to-head matches among tied teams;
2. Goal difference in head-to-head matches among tied teams;
3. Goals scored in head-to-head matches among tied teams;
4. If more than two teams are tied, and after applying all head-to-head criteria above, a subset of teams are still tied, all head-to-head criteria above are reapplied exclusively to this subset of teams;
5. Goal difference in all group matches;
6. Goals scored in all group matches;
7. Penalty shoot-out if only two teams are tied and they met in the last round of the group;
8. Disciplinary points (yellow card = 1 point, red card as a result of two yellow cards = 3 points, direct red card = 3 points, yellow card followed by direct red card = 4 points);
9. Drawing of lots.

=== Group A ===
Pos	Team	Pld	W	D	L	GF	GA	GD	Pts	Qualification
1	Ramatlaohle Ladies	2	1	1	0	5	3	+2	4	Knockout Stages
2	Super Strikers	2	1	1	0	3	2	+1	4	
3	RC Raycon Ladies	2	0	0	2	1	4	−3	0	

15 October
15:30

Super Strikers	2–2	Ramatlaohle Ladies

Loerie Park Sports Stadium
16 October
09:00

Super Strikers	1–0	RC Raycon Ladies

Loerie Park Sports Stadium
17 October
15:00

RC Raycon Ladies	1–3	Ramatlaohle Ladies

Loerie Park Sports Stadium

=== Group B ===
Pos	Team	Pld	W	D	L	GF	GA	GD	Pts	Qualification
1	University of the Free State	2	2	0	0	6	2	+4	6	Knockout Stages
2	Royal Wizards	2	1	0	1	3	5	−2	3	
3	North West University	2	0	0	2	4	6	−2	0	

15 October
13:30

North West University	2–3	University of the Free State

Loerie Park Sports Stadium
16 October
09:00

North West University	2–3	Royal Wizards

Loerie Park Sports Stadium
17 October
15:00

University of the Free State	3–0	Royal Wizards

Loerie Park Sports Stadium

=== Group C ===
Pos	Team	Pld	W	D	L	GF	GA	GD	Pts	Qualification
1	University of Cape Town	2	1	1	0	7	1	+6	4	Knockout Stages
2	Ezemvelo	2	1	1	0	3	1	+2	4	
3	Sophakama Ladies	2	0	0	2	0	8	−8	0	

15 October
10:30

Ezemvelo	2–0	Sophakama Ladies

Loerie Park Sports Stadium
16 October
15:30

Ezemvelo	1–1	University of Cape Town

Loerie Park Sports Stadium
17 October
15:00

Sophakama Ladies	0–6	University of Cape Town

Loerie Park Sports Stadium

=== Ranking of second-placed teams ===
Pos	Grp	Team	Pld	W	D	L	GF	GA	GD	Pts	Qualification
1	C	Ezemvelo	2	1	1	0	3	1	+2	4	Semi-finals
2	A	Super Strikers	2	1	1	0	3	2	+1	4	
3	B	Royal Wizards	2	1	0	1	3	5	−2	3	

Rules for classification: Group tiebreakers

== Knockout stage ==
- In the knockout stage, extra-time and a penalty shoot-out will be used to decide the winner if necessary.

=== Bracket ===
Semi-finals
18 October – Loerie Park Sports Stadium
Ramatlaohle	0
Ezemvelo	1
18 October – Loerie Park Sports Stadium
University of Cape Town	4
University of the Free State	0

Final
20 October – Loerie Park Sports Stadium
Ezemvelo	2
University of Cape Town	0

=== Semi-finals ===
18 October
11:00

Ramatlaohle	0–1	Ezemvelo

Loerie Park Sports Stadium
18 October
15:00

University of Cape Town	4–0	University of the Free State

Loerie Park Sports Stadium

=== Final ===
19 October
12:00

Ezemvelo	2–0	University of Cape Town

Loerie Park Sports Stadium

== Final standings ==
Rank	Team	Prize money
1	Ezemvelo	R200 000
2	University of Cape Town	R100 000
3	Ramatlaohle	R50 000
3	University of the Free State	R50 000
5	Super Strikers Ladies	R30 000
6	Royal Wizards	R25 000
7	North West University	R20 000
8	FC Raycon Ladies	R15 000
9	Sophakama Ladies	R10 000

== Awards ==
Award	Winner	Club
Best Player	Zamandosi Nene	Ezemvelo
Best goalkeeper	Kaydee Windvogel	University of Cape Town
Top goalscorer	Matshwantsho Dlamini	University of the Free State
Best Young Player	Mavis Maiacane	Super Strikers Ladies
Referee of the Tournament	Hloniphile Msezane	
Assistant Referee of the Tournament	Nolitha Mlhomi	
