= Mighty Birds =

- Founded: 1985
- Ground: Soweto

Mighty Birds are a former South African football club from the Soweto area of Johannesburg. The club was formed by a splinter group from Moroka Swallows F.C. whose nickname is the Mighty Birds.

In 1985, several popular Moroka Swallows players including Aaron Makhathini decided to form the club and affiliate it to the NPSL, the league that Moroka Swallows had recently vacated to join the newly formed NSL. This would mean that Moroka Swallows would lose key players to the newly formed club. Some Moroka Swallows fans took exception to this and on 12 April 1985, Makathini was killed on his doorstep in Pimville. In addition two executive members of the Swallows team were arrested and later released for his murder.

Division	Position	Games played	Games won	Games drew	Games lost	Goals for	Goals against	Points	Source
1997 National First Division (Northern stream)	7	42	19	11	12	76	58	68	
1998 National First Division (Inland stream)	17	38	5	8	25	45	99	23	
