= 2023 Sasol League National Championship =

Tournament details
- Country: South Africa
- City: Bloemfontein
- Venue: Dr Petrus Molemela Stadium
- Date: 16 - 22 October 2023
- Teams: 9

Final positions
- Champions: University of Fort Hare
- Runners-up: Lindelani Ladies
- Semifinalists: Ramatlaohle Ladies; Croesus Ladies

Tournament statistics
- Matches played: 12
- Goals scored: 45 (3.75 per match)
- Top goal scorer(s): Lerato Ruele (4 goals)

Awards
- Best player: Nomfundo Xulu
- Best young player: Akhona Mkhize
- Best goalkeeper: Thabisa Maleni

The 2023 Sasol League National Championship is the 14th edition of Sasol League National Championship since it was formed in 2009. It was held at Dr. Petrus Molemela Stadium in Bloemfontein.

University of Fort Hare were crowned Sasol League National Champions after defeating Lindelani Ladies 4-3 on penalties. Both teams secured promotion to the SAFA Women's League.

== Participating teams ==
All nine teams qualified through winning their provincial league.

Team	Provincial League
University of Fort Hare	Eastern Cape Sasol League
Ixias Ladies	Free State Sasol League
Croesus Ladies	Gauteng Sasol League
Lindelani Ladies	KwaZulu Natal Sasol League
Ramatlaohle Ladies	Limpopo Sasol League
Sasol Juventus	Mpumalanga Sasol League
Royal Wizards	Northern Cape Sasol League
Royal Queens	North West Sasol League
University of Cape Town	Western Cape Sasol League

== Group stages ==
=== Group A ===
Pos	Team	Pld	W	D	L	GF	GA	GD	Pts	Qualification
1	Croesus Ladies	2	2	0	0	8	3	+5	6	Knockout Stages
2	Sasol Juventus	2	1	0	1	4	7	−3	3	
3	Royal Queens	2	0	0	2	4	6	−2	0	

=== Group B ===
Pos	Team	Pld	W	D	L	GF	GA	GD	Pts	Qualification
1	University of Fort Hare	2	2	0	0	5	2	+3	6	Knockout Stages
2	Lindelani Ladies	2	1	0	1	5	2	+3	3	Knockout Stages
3	Royal Wizards	2	0	0	2	3	9	−6	0	

=== Group C ===
Pos	Team	Pld	W	D	L	GF	GA	GD	Pts	Qualification
1	Ramatlaohle Ladies	2	1	1	0	4	2	+2	4	Knockout Stages
2	University of Cape Town	2	1	0	1	4	3	+1	3	
3	Ixias FC	2	0	1	1	1	4	−3	1	

== Knockout stages ==
=== Semi finals ===
20 October 2023
12:00 SAT

Ramatlaohle Ladies	0–3	Lindelani Ladies

Dr Petrus Molemela Stadium, Bloemfontein
20 October 2023
15:00

Croesus FC	2–2	UFH Ladies

Dr Petrus Molemela Stadium, Bloemfontein

=== Final ===
22 October 2023
15:00

Lindelani Ladies	0–0	UFH Ladies
Penalties
	3-4

Dr Petrus Molemela Stadium, Bloemfontein

== Statistics ==
=== Top scorer ===
Rank	Player	Club	Goals
1	Lerato Ruele	Croesus Ladies	4
2	Lesego Dube	Croesus Ladies	2
2	Nizole Ngece	UFT Ladies	2
2	Phumla Simelane	Sasol Juventus	2
2	Mbalenhle Nteza	Lindelani Ladies	2
2	Alicia Terhart	University of Cape Town	2
2	Nomfundo Xulu	Lindelani Ladies	2
8	Koketso Mahlangu	Croesus Ladies	1
8	Lungelo Msweli	Lindelani Ladies	1
8	Omuhle Ngcobo	Lindelani Ladies	1

=== Clean sheets ===
Rank	Player	Club	Clean Sheets
1	Thabisa Baleni	UFH	1
1	Nqobile Biyela	Lindelani Ladies	1
1	Robyn Coetzee	University of Cape Town	1
1	Unathi Gcamgcam	UFH	1

== Awards ==
Award	Winner	Club
Best Player	Nomfundo Xulu	Lindelani Ladies
Best goalkeeper	Thabisa Maleni	UFH Ladies
Top goalscorer	Lerato Ruele	Croesus Ladies
Best Young Player	Akhona Mkhize	Lindelani Ladies
Referee of the Tournament	Hloniphile Msizane	
Assistant Referee of the Tournament	Amogelang Msiza	
