= Lindelani Ladies F.C. =

South African women's football club

- Full name: Lindelani Ladies F.C.
- Founded: 2002; 23 years ago
- Ground: Princess Magogo Stadium
- Capacity: 12000
- Coordinates: 29.744249°S 30.971264°E
- Head coach: (South Africa) Nkosinathi Vilakazi
- League: SAFA Women's League
- 2024: 15th (relegated)

Lindelani Ladies F.C. is a South African women's soccer club based in Ntuzuma, KwaZulu-Natal. The team competes in the SAFA Women's League, the top tier women's football league in South Africa.

== History ==
In 2021, they were won the KwaZulu-Natal Sasol Women's League stream B unbeaten with 13 wins and 1 draw. They were crowned KwaZulu-Natal champions after 1-1 and 3-3 draws with stream A winners Sunflowers F.C. Lindelani Ladies won the title on the away goal rule.

In the 2021 Sasol League National Championship, they were semi-finalists losing 3–2 to City Lads.

In 2022, they defended their provincial title and qualified for the 2022 Sasol League National Championship. They were semi-finalists again this time losing to eventual winners Copperbelt Ladies.

In 2023, they won their third straight provincial title and qualified for the 2023 Sasol League National Championship where they won 3–0 in their semi final against Ramatlaohle F.C. and gained promotion to the SAFA Women's League. The side lost 4–3 on penalties in the final to University of Fort Hare after the match ended in a 0–0 draw.

In 2024, they became the first team to be relegated after just one season in the top flight.

== Honours ==
- KwaZulu-Natal Sasol Women's League: 2021, 2022, 2023
- Sasol League National Championship: runner-up: 2023

== Team Statistics ==
=== SAFA Women's League record ===
| Season | Pos | Record | | | | | | | |
| Season | Pos | P | W | D | L | F | A | GD | Pst |
|---|---|---|---|---|---|---|---|---|---|
| 2024 | 15th place | 29 | 5 | 1 | 23 | 23 | 64 | (41) | 16 |

- Gold = Champions
- Red = Relegated
