= Shane Poggenpoel =

South African soccer player

Personal information
- Full name: Shane Poggenpoel
- Date of birth: 12 March 1984 (age 42)
- Place of birth: Cape Town, South Africa
- Height: 1.78 m (5 ft 10 in)
- Positions: Defensive midfielder; central midfielder

Team information
- Current team: University of Pretoria Football Club
- Number: 25

Youth career
- Liverpool Portland
- Young Strikers
- Ajax Cape Town

Senior career*
Years	Team	Apps	(Gls)
2001–2006	Ajax Cape Town	?	(?)
2006–2011	Supersport United	74	(0)
2012	Maritzburg United	5	(0)
2013–	Milano United	33	(0)
- * Club domestic league appearances and goals as of 2 August 2014

Shane Poggenpoel (born 12 March 1984 in Cape Town, Western Cape) is a South African football (soccer) defensive midfielder for Tuks.
