= Ugochi Nwaigwe =

American-born Nigerian basketball

Yakın Doğu Üniversitesi
- Position: Center
- League: TKBL

Personal information
- Born: May 3, 1993 (age 33)
- Listed height: 6 ft 3 in (1.91 m)

Career information
- College: Temple
Medals
Women's basketball
Representing Nigeria
AfroBasket
Gold medal – first place	2017 Mali

Ugochi Nwaigwe (born May 3, 1993) is an American-born Nigerian basketball player for Yakın Doğu Üniversitesi and the Nigerian national team.

== Wagner and Temple statistics ==
Ratios
Year	Team	GP	FG%	3P%	FT%	RBG	APG	BPG	SPG	PPG
2011-12	Wagner	26	44.0%	-	54.5%	2.50	0.19	0.42	0.15	2.15
2012-13	Wagner	9	27.7%	-	33.3%	5.11	0.11	0.56	0.89	3.22
2013-14	Wagner	30	58.9%	-	46.6%	8.70	0.17	3.80	0.67	6.87
2014-15	Wagner	5	61.5%	-	20.0%	6.20	0.80	1.40	0.60	6.60
2015-16	Temple	31	41.9%	-	43.3%	3.65	0.13	1.52	0.32	2.74
Career		101	48.7%	-	45.3%	5.11	0.19	1.82	0.45	4.05

Totals
Year	Team	GP	FG	FGA	3P	3PA	FT	FTA	REB	A	BK	ST	PTS
2011-12	Wagner	26	22	50	0	0	12	22	65	5	11	4	56
2012-13	Wagner	9	13	47	0	0	3	9	46	1	5	8	29
2013-14	Wagner	30	86	146	0	0	34	73	261	5	114	20	206
2014-15	Wagner	5	16	26	0	0	1	5	31	4	7	3	33
2015-16	Temple	31	36	86	0	0	13	30	113	4	47	10	85
Career		101	173	355	0	0	63	139	516	19	184	45	409

== International career ==
She participated at the 2017 Women's Afrobasket.
