= University of Fort Hare Women's F.C. =

UFH Ladies F.C.
- Full name: University of Fort Hare Women's Football Club
- Nickname: Baby Wolves
- Ground: Davidson Stadium
- Coordinates: -32.78355,26.8496
- Head Coach: (South Africa) Asanda Mnakaniso
- League: SAFA Women's League
- 2025: 4th

The University of Fort Hare Women's Football Club, also known as UFH Ladies F.C., is the football club representing the University of Fort Hare based in Alice, Eastern Cape. The team competes in the SAFA Women's League, the top tier women's football league in South Africa.

They won the 2023 Sasol League National Championship to became the first team from the Eastern Cape to win the tournament.

== History ==
In the 2023 Eastern Cape Sasol Women's League Coastal Stream, they were unbeaten with 15 wins and 1 draw. In the provincial play off to crown the Eastern Cape champion they won 4-1 against Inland Stream winners Executive Ladies and gained entry into the Sasol League National Championship as the Eastern Cape Sasol Women's League winners.

In the 2023 Sasol League National Championship, they faced Crouses Ladies in the semi-final which ended in a 2-2 draw with UFH Ladies winning 5-4 on penalties. This win gained them promotion to the Hollywoodbets Super League. In the final, they faced Lindelani Ladies and won 5-4 on penalties after the game ended in a goalless draw. That meant the team made history as the first Eastern Cape based team to win the Sasol League National Championship and on their first attempt.

They finished off the 2023 season with their Varsity Women's Football Cup debut.

=== SAFA Women's League ===
The team started their top flight campaign with a 2-1 against TUT Matsatsantsa Ladies on 2 March 2024. They won their second match of the league against TS Galaxy Queens on 20 April 2024.

== Honours ==
- Eastern Cape Sasol Women's League: 2023
- Sasol League National Championship: 2023

== Notable players ==
Players who have received a Banyana Banyana call up while playing for the university:

- Kesha Hendricks
- Nokuphila Mpatsiyana
