= Croesus Ladies F.C. =

- Full name: Croesus Ladies Football Club
- Nickname: "Greek Queens"
- Founded: 1996
- League: Sasol Women's League
- 2023: 1st Stream A

Croesus Ladies F.C., also known as Greek Queens, is a women's soccer club based in Balfour Park, Gauteng. The team competes in the Sasol Women's League, the second tier women's football league in South Africa.

== History ==
The team was founded in 1996 as Hillbrow Ladies by Edison Mbatha. In 2017 Mbatha partnered with Athanassouli

They won the 2021 Gauteng Sasol Women's League which qualified them for the 2021 Sasol League National Championship where they finished fourth.

They won the Gauteng Sasol Women's League title in 2023 and finished as semi-finalist in the 2023 Sasol League National Championship after losing 5-4 via penalties to eventual winners University of Fort Hare after their match ended in a one-all draw.

== Honours ==
- Sasol League National Championship: Fourth: 2021
- Gauteng Sasol Women's League: 2021, 2023
