= Ezemvelo =

Women's soccer club in South Africa

Ezemvelo W.F.C
- Full name: Ezemvelo Women's Football Club
- Founded: 2023; 3 years ago
- Chairlady: Dhana Sithole
- Head Coach: (South Africa) Nkosingiphile Maphumulo
- League: Sasol Women's League
- 2025: 11th

Ezemvelo Women's Football Club is a South African women's soccer club based in Isipingo (eThekwini Metropolitan Municipality), KwaZulu-Natal. The team competes in the SAFA Women's League, the top tier women's football league in South Africa.

In 2024 they became the first team from KwaZulu-Natal to be crowned national champions at the 2024 Sasol League National Championship.

== History ==
The club was founded in 2023 and won the eThekwini Women's Regional League in their maiden season.

=== Sasol Women's League/Sasol League National Championship ===
In 2024 they were promoted to the KZN Sasol Women's League. They won their steam and provincial playoffs and qualified for the 2024 Sasol League National Championship. They reached the finals of the championship after a 1–0 win over Ramatlaohle from Limpopo and gained promotion to the SAFA Women's League. They won the championship after defeating the University of Cape Town 2-0 in the final and became the first team from KwaZulu-Natal to win the title.

=== SAFA Women's League ===
They made their SAFA Women's League debut on 2 March 2025 against JVW. They lost the match 3-2 with 16 year-old Siphesihle Mvila netting their maiden goal.

== Honours ==
- Sasol League National Championship: 2024
- KZN Sasol Women's League: 2024
- eThekwini Women's Regional League: 2023
