= Kebotseng Moletsane =

South African soccer player (born 1995)

Personal information
- Full name: Kebotseng Katlego Getrude Moletsane
- Date of birth: 3 March 1995 (age 31)
- Height: 1.67 m (5 ft 6 in)
- Position: Goalkeeper

Team information
- Current team: University of the Western Cape
- Number: 1

Senior career*
Years	Team	Apps	(Gls)
–2022	Bloemfontein Celtic Ladies		
2022–2024	Royal AM		
2025–	University of the Western Cape		

International career
2022–	South Africa	1	(0)
- * Club domestic league appearances and goals

Kebotseng Katlego Getrude Moletsane (born 3 March 1995) is a South African soccer player who plays as a goalkeeper for UWC Ladies and the South Africa women's national team.

== Club career ==
Moletsane previously played for the High Performance Centre (Tshwane).

Since 2022, she has played for Royal AM Women after they acquired her former team Bloemfontein Celtics Ladies.

== Honours ==
South Africa

- Women's Africa Cup of Nations: 2022
