= Parkhurst Academy =

South African football club

Parkhurst Academy, currently known as Mr Price Parkhurst Academy for sponsorship reasons, is a South African football club. They play in the Vodacom League and were founded in 1996 following a split from Kenpark United.
