= Royal AM Women F.C. =

- Full name: Royal AM Women's Football Club
- Nickname: Thwihli Thwahla
- Founded: 2022; 4 years ago
- Ground: Harry Gwala Stadium
- Capacity: 6500
- Coordinates: 29.6173° S, 30.3843° E
- Owner: Shauwn Mkhize
- Chairman: Andile Mpisane
- Manager: (South Africa) Thato Haraba
- League: SAFA Women's League
- 2025: 15th

Royal AM Women F.C. is a women's soccer club based in Pietermaritzburg, Kwa-Zulu Natal. The team competes in the Sasol Women's League, the second tier women's football league in South Africa.

== History ==
In 2022, Shauwn Mkhize purchased Bloemfontein Celtics Ladies, forming Royal AM Ladies.

The club ended their maiden 2022 Hollywoodbets Super League in 6th position. In 2023, they ended the 2023 Hollywoodbets Super League season in 5th position. In the 2025 season the team finished in 15th position and was relegated to the Sasol League.

== Notable players ==
=== FIFA World Cup participants ===
List of players that were called up for a FIFA Women's World Cup while playing for Royal AM Women. In brackets, the tournament played:

- (South Africa) Kebotseng Moletsane (2023)

== Team statistics ==
=== SAFA Women's League record ===
Season	Pos	Record							
Season	Pos	P	W	D	L	F	A	GD	Pst
2022	6th place	30	13	12	5	37	22	15	51
2023	5th place	30	16	7	7	53	29	24	55
2024	7th place	30	11	10	9	50	42	8	43
2025	15th place	30	5	4	21	25	75	(50)	19

- Orange = In progress
- Gold = Champions
- Silver = Runner up

==== SAFA Women's League statistics ====
- Record number of games won in a season: 16 games (2023)
- Record number of points in a season: 55 points (2023)
- Record goals scored in a season: 53 goals (2023)
- Record for lowest number of goals conceded in a season: 22 goals (2022)
- Record for lowest number of defeats in a season: 5 games (2022)
