= Central University of Technology, Free State Women's F.C. =

Ixias Ladies F.C.
- Full name: Central University of Technology, Free State Women's Football Club
- Ground: CUT Stadium
- Coordinates: 29.1238° S, 26.2158° E
- Owner: Central University of Technology, Free State
- League: Sasol Women's League
- 2023: 1st Stream A
- Website: https://www.cut.ac.za/student-life---sports

The Central University of Technology, Free State Women's Football Club, also knowns as Ixias Ladies F.C. or CUT Ladies, is the football club representing the Central University of Technology, Free State based in Bloemfontein, Free State. The team competes in the Sasol Women's League, the second tier women's football league in South Africa.

== History ==
In 2021 they won the Free State Sasol Women's League after a 2-1 win over Kovsie Ladies to defend the title won in 2019.

In 2023 they won the Free State Sasol Women's League, winning 1-0 against Kovsie Ladies in the provincial final. The team qualified for the 2023 Sasol League National Championship were they finished last in their group.

== Honours ==
- Free State Sasol Women's League:2019, 2021, 2023
