= City Lads Ladies F.C. =

- Full name: City Lads Ladies Football Club
- Nicknames: "Gunners" "Sinakho"
- Ground: Isaac Wolfson Stadium
- Capacity: 10000
- Coordinates: 33.884463°S 25.595285°E
- CEO: Nomalungelo Mooi
- Co-Coaches: Christo Tom and Unabantu Gcule
- League: SAFA Women's League
- 2025: 13th

City Lads Ladies F.C. is a women's soccer club based in New Brighton, Eastern Cape. The team competes in the SAFA Women's League, the top tier women's football league in South Africa.

Nomalungelo Mooi is the club's CEO.

== History ==
=== Sasol Women's League ===
They had previously won the 2021 Eastern Cape Sasol Women's League.

In 2021, they were granted promotion into the Hollywoodbets Super League after finishing as finalists in the 2021 Sasol League National Championship. They lost 4–3 to Western Cape champions Vasco Da Gama in the final.

=== SAFA Women's League ===
They made their debut in the 2022 season and finished in 12th place in their maiden season.

=== Engen Knockout Challenge ===
They won the 2022 Eastern Cape Engen Knockout Challenge.

== Honours ==
- Eastern Cape Sasol Women's League: 2021
- Sasol Women's League: runner's up: 2021
- Eastern Cape Engen Knockout Challenge: 2022

== Team statistics ==
=== SAFA Women's League record ===
| Season | Pos | Record | | | | | | | |
| Season | Pos | P | W | D | L | F | A | GD | Pst |
|---|---|---|---|---|---|---|---|---|---|
| 2022 | 12th | 30 | 8 | 5 | 17 | 36 | 75 | (39) | 23 |
| 2023 | 13th | 30 | 7 | 4 | 19 | 29 | 66 | (37) | 25 |
| 2024 | 14th | 30 | 5 | 8 | 17 | 28 | 53 | (25) | 23 |
| 2025 | 13th | 30 | 7 | 6 | 17 | 29 | 53 | (26) | 23 |

- Orange = In progress
- Gold = Champions
- Silver = Runner up
