= TS Galaxy Queens =

TS Galaxy Queens F.C.
- Full name: Tim Sukazi Galaxy Queens
- Nickname: The Rockets
- Ground: Solomon Mahlangu Stadium
- Capacity: 5000
- Coordinates: 25.4315°S 28.7148°E
- Owner: Tim Sukazi
- Chairman: Dudu Sukazi
- Head coach: (South Africa) Sizwe Sibiya
- League: SAFA Women's League
- 2025: 3rd
- Website: www.tsgalaxyfc.com
Home colours

TS Galaxy Queens Football Club is a women's soccer club from Kameelrivier (Nkangala District Municipality) near Siyabuswa (Mpumalanga) based in Sandton, Gauteng. The team competes in the SAFA Women's League, the top tier women's football league in South Africa.

The club, like its male counterpart TS Galaxy F.C., is named after its owner Tim Sukazi, who purchased the Hollywoodbets Super League status from Vasco da Gama in January 2023. Its president is Dudu Sukazi.

In 2026 they won their maiden trophy at the Pirates Cup.

== History ==
They finished their second season in the women's top flight in 4th position behind JVW, UWC Ladies and record sixth time winners Mamelodi Sundowns Ladies.

At the start of the 2024 season they announced Ashraf Calvert as their new head coach. He won 4 matches and lost 3 to set the side in 9th place after 7 matches. In April 2024 they re-appointed Sizwe Sibiya as head coach. They finished the 2025 season in third place by goal difference after JVW claimed second place with a superior goal difference of 41 goals to their 39 goals.

In 2024, they were third in the Pirates Cup. They won their maiden title at the Pirates Cup in 2026.

== Players ==
=== Coaching record ===
All-time TS Galaxy Queens coaching records
| Coach | Nat. | Tenure | Games | Win | Loss | Draw | Win % |
|---|---|---|---|---|---|---|---|
| Sizwe Sibiya | South Africa | January 2022 – December 2023 | 30 | 18 | 5 | 7 | 60.00 |
| Ashraf Calvert | South Africa | January 2024 – April 2024 | 7 | 4 | 3 | 0 | 57.14 |
| Sizwe Sibiya | South Africa | April 2024 – present (as of March 2026) | 52 | 34 | 7 | 11 | 65.38 |

=== Notable players ===
==== FIFA World Cup participants ====
List of players that were called up for a FIFA Women's World Cup while playing for TS Galaxy Queens. In brackets, the tournament played:

- (South Africa) Nomvula Kgoale (2023)

== Honours ==
- SAFA Women's League: Third: 2024, 2025
- Pirates Cup (Women): 2026 Third: 2024

=== SAFA Women's League record ===
| Season | Pos | Record | | | | | | | |
| Season | Pos | P | W | D | L | F | A | GD | Pst |
|---|---|---|---|---|---|---|---|---|---|
| 2023 | 4th | 30 | 18 | 7 | 5 | 62 | 22 | 40 | 61 |
| 2024 | 3rd | 30 | 20 | 5 | 5 | 67 | 28 | 39 | 65 |
| 2025 | 3rd | 30 | 21 | 6 | 3 | 57 | 18 | 39 | 69 |

- Orange = In progress
- Gold = Champions
- Silver = Runner up

==== SAFA Women's League statistics ====
- Record number of games won in a season: 21 games (2025)
- Record number of points in a season: 69 points (2025)
- Record goals scored in a season: 67 goals (2024)
- Record for lowest number of goals conceded in a season: 18 goals (2025)
- Record for lowest number of defeats in a season: 3 games (2025)
