= Mamello Makhabane =

South African soccer player (born 1988)

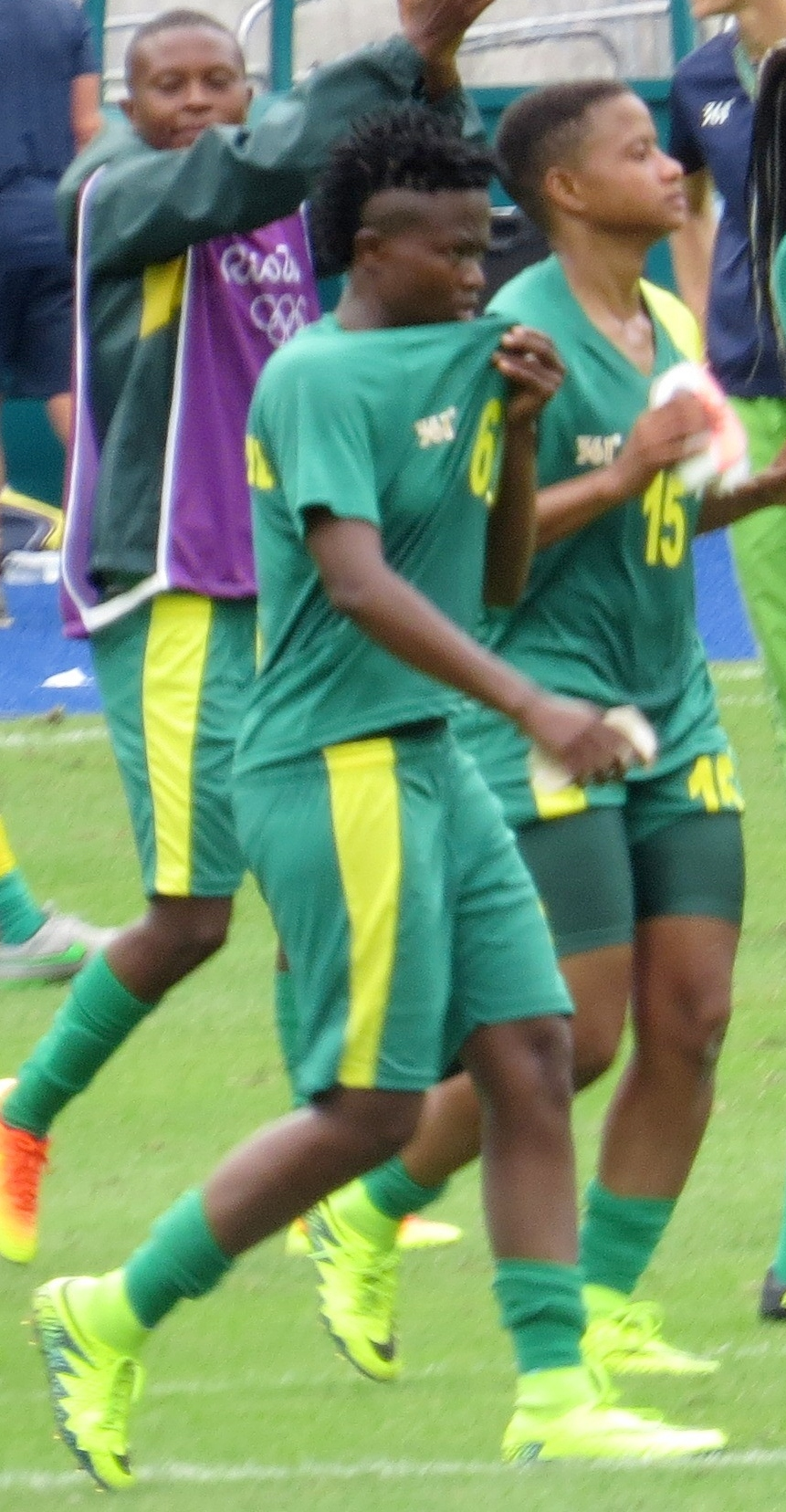
- Makhabane at the 2016 Olympics

Personal information
- Date of birth: 24 February 1988 (age 38)
- Place of birth: Kutloanong, Gauteng, South Africa
- Height: 1.59 m (5 ft 3 in)
- Position: Midfielder

Team information
- Current team: Kaizer Chiefs Ladies F.C.
- Number: 15

Senior career*
Years	Team	Apps	(Gls)
–	Kutloanong Ladies		
–	Palace Super Falcons		
–2022	JVW F.C.		
2023–2025	TS Galaxy Queens		
2026–	Kaizer Chiefs Ladies F.C.		

International career^{‡}
2005–	South Africa	105	(18+)
- * Club domestic league appearances and goals ‡ National team caps and goals as of 19:29, 13 February 2020 (UTC)

Mamello Makhabane (born 24 February 1988) is a South African soccer player who plays as a midfielder for Kaizer Chiefs Ladies and the South Africa women's national team.

She was the diski queen (player) of the tournament at the 2014 and 2016 Sasol League National Championship and was the queen of the queens (players player) of the tournament in 2016.

== Club career ==
=== Palace Super Falcons ===
She won the Sasol League National Championship three times in a row with Palace Super Falcons from 2010–2012 and was diski queen (player) of the tournament when they were runners-up to Cape Town Roses in 2014.

=== JVW ===
She was part of the team that were runner-ups in the 2016 national championship and won their maiden title in 2019 earning promotion to the SAFA Women's League.

=== TS Galaxy Queens ===
She played for TS Galaxy Queens from 2023 till 2025.

=== Kaizer Chiefs Ladies ===
Makhabane was one of the 24 players signed by the newly formed Kaizer Chiefs Ladies in March 2026.

== International career ==
Makhabane was included into the national team in 2005. After helping South Africa qualify for the 2012 Summer Olympics, Makhabane was unable to participate in the tournament due to a groin injury sustained in September 2011. In September 2014, she was named to the senior team roster in preparation for the 2014 African Women's Championship in Namibia.

She made her 100th appearance for South Africa in August 2019.

=== International goals ===
No.	Date	Venue	Opponent	Score	Result	Competition
1.	3 July 2011	Gwanzura, Harare, Zimbabwe	Botswana	3–0	4–0	2011 COSAFA Women's Championship

== Honours ==
Palace Super Falcons

- Sasol League National Championship: 2010, 2011, 2012 runners-up: 2014
- Gauteng Sasol Women's League: 2010, 2011, 2012

JVW

- Sasol League National Championship: 2019; runners-up: 2016
- Gauteng Sasol Women's League: 2016, 2019

TS Galaxy Queens

- SAFA Women's League third place: 2024, 2025

Individual

- 2014 Sasol League National Championship: Diski Queen of the Tournament
- 2016 Sasol League National Championship: Diski Queen of the Tournament
- 2016 Sasol League National Championship: Queen of queens of the Tournament
