= 2012 Sasol League National Championship =

Tournament details
- Country: South Africa
- City: Umlazi
- Venue: King Zwelithini Stadium
- Dates: 25 June - 1 July 2012
- Teams: 9

Final positions
- Champions: Palace Super Falcons
- Runners-up: Cape Town Roses
- Third place: Durban Ladies
- Fourth place: Bloemfontein Celtic Ladies

Tournament statistics
- Top goal scorer(s): Slindile Ngubane (11 goals)

Awards
- Best player: Portia Modise
- Best young player: Abongiwe Dlali
- Best goalkeeper: Bridgette Molale

The 2012 Sasol League National Championship was the 4th edition of the Sasol League National Championship since it was formed in 2009. It was held at King Zwelithini Stadium in Umlazi.

Palace Super Falcons were defending champions. They successfully defended their title for the third successive year defeating Cape Town Roses 5-2 in the final.

== Participating teams ==
All nine teams qualified through winning their provincial leagues.

Team	Provincial League
City Lads Ladies	Eastern Cape Sasol League
Bloemfontein Celtic Ladies	Free State Sasol League
Palace Super Falcons	Gauteng Sasol League
Durban Ladies	KwaZulu Natal Sasol League
Kanatla Ladies	Limpopo Sasol League
Msiphuya Ladies	Mpumalanga Sasol League
RC Mills	Northern Cape Sasol League
Al’s Puk Tawana	North West Sasol League
Cape Town Roses	Western Cape Sasol League

== Draw ==
The draw for the 2014 championship took place in June 2012. The nine teams were divided into the following two groups:

Group A	Group B
Durban Ladies (hosts); Msiphuya Ladies; Bloemfontein Celtic Ladies; RC Mills; Al’s Puk Tawana	Palace Super Falcons; Kanatla Ladies; Cape Town Roses; City Lads Ladies

== Group stages ==
Tiebreakers

Teams are ranked according to points (3 points for a win, 1 point for a draw, 0 points for a loss), and if tied on points, the following tiebreaking criteria are applied, in the order given, to determine the rankings.

1. Points in head-to-head matches among tied teams;
2. Goal difference in head-to-head matches among tied teams;
3. Goals scored in head-to-head matches among tied teams;
4. If more than two teams are tied, and after applying all head-to-head criteria above, a subset of teams are still tied, all head-to-head criteria above are reapplied exclusively to this subset of teams;
5. Goal difference in all group matches;
6. Goals scored in all group matches;
7. Penalty shoot-out if only two teams are tied and they met in the last round of the group;
8. Disciplinary points (yellow card = 1 point, red card as a result of two yellow cards = 3 points, direct red card = 3 points, yellow card followed by direct red card = 4 points);
9. Drawing of lots.

=== Group A ===
Pos	Team	Pld	W	D	L	GF	GA	GD	Pts	Qualification
1	Durban Ladies	4	4	0	0	27	2	+25	12	Knockout Stages
2	Bloemfontein Celtic Ladies	4	3	0	1	27	10	+17	9	Knockout Stages
3	Msiphuya Ladies	4	1	1	2	18	15	+3	4	
4	Al’s Puk Tawana	4	1	1	2	15	20	−5	4	
5	RC Mills	4	0	0	4	3	43	−40	0	

25 June

Bloemfontein Celtics Ladies	10–2	RC Mills

King Zwelithini Stadium
25 June

Durban Ladies	9–1	Al’s Puk Tawana

King Zwelithini Stadium
26 June

Al’s Puk Tawana	10–1	RC Mills

King Zwelithini Stadium
26 June

Bloemfontein Celtics Ladies	9–1	Msiphuya Ladies

King Zwelithini Stadium
27 June

Msiphuya Ladies	13–0	RC Mills

King Zwelithini Stadium
27 June

Durban Ladies	6–0	Bloemfontein Celtics Ladies

King Zwelithini Stadium
28 June

RC Mills	0–10	Durban Ladies

King Zwelithini Stadium
28 June

Msiphuya Ladies	3–3	Al’s Puk Tawana

King Zwelithini Stadium
28 June

Al’s Puk Tawana	1–7	Bloemfontein Celtics Ladies

King Zwelithini Stadium
28 June

Msiphuya Ladies	1–2	Durban Ladies

King Zwelithini Stadium

=== Group B ===
Pos	Team	Pld	W	D	L	GF	GA	GD	Pts	Qualification
1	Palace Super Falcons	3	2	1	0	7	3	+4	7	Knockout Stages
2	Cape Town Roses	3	2	0	1	7	3	+4	6	Knockout Stages
3	Kanatla Ladies	3	1	1	1	0	0	0	4	
4	City Lads Ladies	3	0	0	3	2	10	−8	0	

26 June

Palace Super Falcons	5–0	City Lads Ladies

King Zwelithini Stadium
26 June

Cape Town Roses	3–0	Kanatla Ladies

King Zwelithini Stadium
27 June

Kanatla Ladies	2–1	City Lads Ladies

King Zwelithini Stadium
27 June

Palace Super Falcons	2–1	Cape Town Roses

King Zwelithini Stadium
28 June

Cape Town Roses	3–1	City Lads Ladies

King Zwelithini Stadium
28 June

Kanatla Ladies	2–2	Palace Super Falcons

King Zwelithini Stadium

== Knockout stage ==
- In the knockout stage, extra-time and a penalty shoot-out will be used to decide the winner if necessary.

=== Bracket ===
Semi-finals
29 June – King Zwelithini Stadium
Cape Town Roses	2
Durban Ladies	1
29 June – King Zwelithini Stadium
Palace Super Falcons	3
Bloemfontein Celtic Ladies	1

Final
1 July – King Zwelithini Stadium
Cape Town Roses	2
Palace Super Falcons	5
Third place
1 July – King Zwelithini Stadium
Durban Ladies	5
Bloemfontein Celtic Ladies	0

=== Semi-finals ===
29 June

Cape Town Roses	2–1	Durban Ladies

King Zwelithini Stadium
29 June

Palace Super Falcons	3–1	Bloemfontein Celtic Ladies

King Zwelithini Stadium

=== 3rd/4th play off ===
1 July

Durban Ladies	5–0	Bloemfontein Celtic Ladies

King Zwelithini Stadium

=== Final ===
1 July

Cape Town Roses	2–5	Palace Super Falcons

King Zwelithini Stadium

== Final standings ==
Rank	Team	Prize money
1	Palace Super Falcons	R50 000
2	Cape Town Roses	R35 000
3	Durban Ladies	R25 000
4	Bloemfontein Celtic Ladies	R20 000
5	City Lads Ladies	R15 000
5	RC Mills	R15 000
5	Al’s Puk Tawana	R15 000
5	Kanatla Ladies	R15 000
5	Msiphuya Ladies	R15 000

== Awards ==
The following were rated best in the tournament:

Award	Winner	Club
Diski Queen of the Tournament	Portia Modise	Palace Super Falcons
Coach of the Tournament	Joe Mabaso	Palace Super Falcons
Best goalkeeper	Bridget Molale	Palace Super Falcons
Queen of Queens of the Tournament	Sanah Mollo	Bloemfontein Celtic Ladies
Top goalscorer of the Tournament	Slindile Ngubane	Durban Ladies
Young Queen of the Tournament	Abongiwe Dlali	Cape Town Roses
Referee of the Tournament	Lufuno Nemagovhane	
