= 2014 Sasol League National Championship =

Tournament details
- Country: South Africa
- City: Port Elizabeth
- Venue: Isaac Wolfson Stadium
- Dates: 9 December 2014 - 14 December 2014
- Teams: 9

Final positions
- Champions: Cape Town Roses
- Runners-up: Palace Super Falcons
- Third place: Coal City Wizards
- Fourth place: Kanatla Ladies

Tournament statistics
- Top goal scorer: Nocawe Skiti

Awards
- Best player: Mamello Makhabane
- Best young player: Noxolo Cesane

The 2014 Sasol League National Championship was the 6th edition of the Sasol League National Championship since it was formed in 2009. It was held at Isaac Wolfson Stadium in Port Elizabeth.

Mamelodi Sundowns Ladies were defending champions. They failed to qualify for this edition as Palace Super Falcons were Gauteng Sasol League champions.

Cape Town Roses defeated Palace Super Falcons 2-1 in the final.

== Participating teams ==
All nine teams qualified through winning their provincial leagues.

| Team | Provincial League |
|---|---|
| Coastal United Ladies | Eastern Cape Sasol League |
| Bloemfontein Celtic Ladies | Free State Sasol League |
| Palace Super Falcons | Gauteng Sasol League |
| Durban Ladies | KwaZulu Natal Sasol League |
| Kanatla Ladies | Limpopo Sasol League |
| Coal City Wizards | Mpumalanga Sasol League |
| Royal Wizards | Northern Cape Sasol League |
| Titans | North West Sasol League |
| Cape Town Roses | Western Cape Sasol League |

== Draw ==
The draw for the 2014 championship took place on 20 November 2014. The nine teams were divided into the following three groups:

| Group A | Group B | Group C |
|---|---|---|
| Cape Town Roses; Coastal United Ladies (hosts); Royal Wizards | Palace Super Falcons; Durban Ladies; Coal City Wizards | Bloemfontein Celtic Ladies; Kanatla Ladies; Titans |

== Group stages ==
Tiebreakers

Teams are ranked according to points (3 points for a win, 1 point for a draw, 0 points for a loss), and if tied on points, the following tiebreaking criteria are applied, in the order given, to determine the rankings.

1. Points in head-to-head matches among tied teams;
2. Goal difference in head-to-head matches among tied teams;
3. Goals scored in head-to-head matches among tied teams;
4. If more than two teams are tied, and after applying all head-to-head criteria above, a subset of teams are still tied, all head-to-head criteria above are reapplied exclusively to this subset of teams;
5. Goal difference in all group matches;
6. Goals scored in all group matches;
7. Penalty shoot-out if only two teams are tied and they met in the last round of the group;
8. Disciplinary points (yellow card = 1 point, red card as a result of two yellow cards = 3 points, direct red card = 3 points, yellow card followed by direct red card = 4 points);
9. Drawing of lots.

=== Group A ===
| Pos | Team | Pld | W | D | L | GF | GA | GD | Pts | Qualification |
|---|---|---|---|---|---|---|---|---|---|---|
| 1 | Cape Town Roses | 2 | 2 | 0 | 0 | 21 | 2 | +19 | 6 | Knockout Stages |
| 2 | Coastal United Ladies | 2 | 0 | 0 | 2 | 3 | 5 | −2 | 0 | Knockout Stages |
| 3 | Royal Wizards | 0 | 0 | 0 | 0 | 0 | 17 | −17 | 0 | |

8 December

| Cape Town Roses | 5–2 | Coastal United Ladies |

Isaac Wolfson Stadium
9 December

| Cape Town Roses | 16–0 | Royal Wizards |

Isaac Wolfson Stadium
10 December

| Royal Wizards | 0–1 | Coastal United Ladies |

Isaac Wolfson Stadium

=== Group B ===
| Pos | Team | Pld | W | D | L | GF | GA | GD | Pts | Qualification |
|---|---|---|---|---|---|---|---|---|---|---|
| 1 | Palace Super Falcons | 2 | 2 | 0 | 0 | 10 | 1 | +9 | 6 | Knockout Stages |
| 2 | Durban Ladies | 2 | 1 | 0 | 1 | 4 | 5 | −1 | 3 | Knockout Stages |
| 3 | Coal City Wizards | 2 | 0 | 0 | 2 | 2 | 10 | −8 | 0 | |

8 December

| Coal City Wizards | 1–4 | Durban Ladies |

Isaac Wolfson Stadium
9 December

| Palace Super Falcons | 4–0 | Durban Ladies |

Isaac Wolfson Stadium
10 December

| Coal City Wizards | 1–6 | Palace Super Falcons |

Isaac Wolfson Stadium

=== Group C ===
| Pos | Team | Pld | W | D | L | GF | GA | GD | Pts | Qualification |
|---|---|---|---|---|---|---|---|---|---|---|
| 1 | Kanatla Ladies | 2 | 2 | 0 | 0 | 4 | 2 | +2 | 6 | Knockout Stages |
| 2 | Bloemfontein Celtic Ladies | 2 | 1 | 0 | 1 | 5 | 2 | +3 | 3 | Knockout Stages |
| 3 | Titans | 2 | 0 | 0 | 2 | 1 | 6 | −5 | 0 | |

8 December

| Kanatla Ladies | 2–1 | Bloemfontein Celtic Ladies |

Isaac Wolfson Stadium
9 December

| Bloemfontein Celtic Ladies | 4–0 | Titans |

Isaac Wolfson Stadium
10 December

| Kanatla Ladies | 2–1 | Titans |

Isaac Wolfson Stadium

=== Ranking of third-placed teams ===
| Pos | Grp | Team | Pld | W | D | L | GF | GA | GD | Pts | Qualification |
|---|---|---|---|---|---|---|---|---|---|---|---|
| 1 | C | Titans | 2 | 0 | 0 | 2 | 1 | 6 | −5 | 0 | #Knockout stage |
| 2 | B | Coal City Wizards | 2 | 0 | 0 | 2 | 2 | 10 | −8 | 0 | #Knockout stage |
| 3 | A | Royal Wizards | 2 | 0 | 0 | 2 | 0 | 17 | −17 | 0 | |

Rules for classification: Group tiebreakers

== Knockout stage ==
- In the knockout stage, extra-time and a penalty shoot-out will be used to decide the winner if necessary.

=== Bracket ===
Semi-finals
12 December – Isaac Wolfson Stadium
Cape Town Roses | 3
Kanatla Ladies | 0
12 December – Isaac Wolfson Stadium
Palace Super Falcons | 7
Coal City Wizards | 1

Final
14 December – Isaac Wolfson Stadium
Cape Town Roses | 2
Palace Super Falcons | 1
Third place
12 December – Isaac Wolfson Stadium
Coal City Wizards | 5
Kanatla Ladies | 2

=== Quarter finals ===
11 December

| Cape Town Roses | 3–0 | Bloemfontein Celtic Ladies |

Isaac Wolfson Stadium
11 December

| Kanatla Ladies | 2–0 | Durban Ladies |

Isaac Wolfson Stadium
11 December

| Coal City Wizards | 3–1 | Titans |

Isaac Wolfson Stadium
11 December

| Palace Super Falcons | 7–0 | Coastal United Ladies |

Isaac Wolfson Stadium

=== Semi-finals ===
12 December

| Cape Town Roses | 3–0 | Kanatla Ladies |

Isaac Wolfson Stadium
12 December

| Palace Super Falcons | 7–0 | Coal City Wizards |

Isaac Wolfson Stadium

=== 3rd/4th play off ===
12 December

| Coal City Wizards | 5–2 | Kanatla Ladies |

Isaac Wolfson Stadium

=== Final ===
14 December

| Cape Town Roses | 2–1 | Palace Super Falcons |
|---|---|---|
| Nocawe Shiti 50', 71' | | Gugu Gabuza 86' |

Isaac Wolfson Stadium, Port Elizabeth

== Final standings ==
| Rank | Team | Prize money |
|---|---|---|
| 1 | Cape Town Roses | R50 000 |
| 2 | Palace Super Falcons | R35 000 |
| 3 | Coal City Wizards | R25 000 |
| 4 | Kanatla Ladies | R20 000 |
| 5 | Durban Ladies | R18 000 |
| 6 | Titans | R16 000 |
| 7 | Bloemfontein Celtic Ladies | R14 000 |
| 8 | Coastal United Ladies | R12 000 |
| 9 | Royal Wizards | R10 000 |

== Awards ==
The following were rated best in the tournament:

| Award | Winner | Club |
|---|---|---|
| Diski Queen of the Tournament | Mamello Makhabane | Palace Super Falcons |
| Queen of Queens of the Tournament | Noxolo Cesane | Cape Town Roses |
| Top goalscorer of the Tournament | Nocawe Skiti | Cape Town Roses |
| Coach of the Tournament | Xolile Madikane | Cape Town Roses |
| Young Queen of the Tournament | Noxolo Cesane | Cape Town Roses |
| Best goalkeeper | | |
| Referee of the Tournament | | |
