= Agnes Nkosi =

South African professional football manager

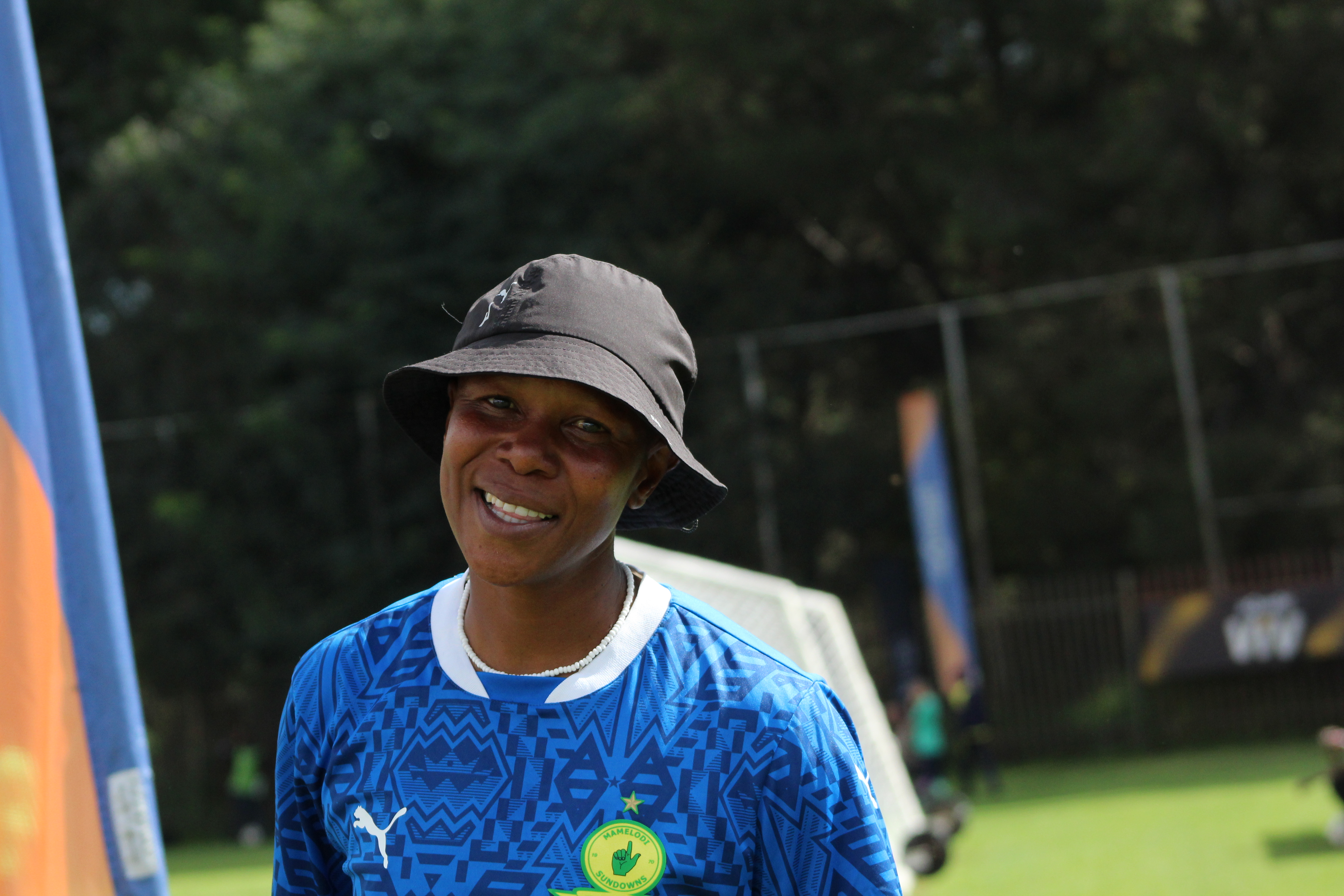
- Nkosi in 2025

Personal information
- Full name: Agnes Thandiwe Nkosi
- Date of birth: 20 August 1987 (age 39)
- Place of birth: Soweto, Gauteng
- Position: Defender

Team information
- Current team: Mamelodi Sundowns Ladies (Assistant)

Senior career*
Years	Team	Apps	(Gls)
2009-2021	Mamelodi Sundowns Ladies		

Managerial career
- 2021-: Mamelodi Sundowns Ladies (Assistant)
- 2022-: Mamelodi Sundowns Ladies Academy
- * Club domestic league appearances and goals

Agnes Thandiwe Nkosi is South African professional football manager and former player who is the current assistant coach of the SAFA Women's League side Mamelodi Sundowns Ladies.

A former defender, Nkosi retired her career with Mamelodi Sundowns Ladies, where she was the captain, mid 2021 season. She was later appointed the assistant coach for Sundowns Ladies from the 2021 season.

== Club career ==
Nkosi is a former Mamelodi Sundowns Ladies captain. She captained the side to the 2015 Sasol League National Championship where she scored a goal in the final when the side won 3-0 against Cape Town Roses in Sasolburg.

== Coaching career ==
Following her retirement from football, she was appointed Mamelodi Sundowns Ladies assistant coach. She was later appointed the head coach of the Mamelodi Sundowns Ladies U/20 side.

She was part of the technical team when the Sundowns senior ladies team won the Hollywoodbets Super League in 2021, 2022, and 2023 season. They also won the COSAFA Women's Champions League in the 2021 and 2023 and were runner's up in the 2022 season losing to Green Buffaloes from Zambia. The side won the inaugural CAF Women's Champions League in 2021, were runners-up in 2022, and reclaimed their continental title in the 2023 edition with her being in Jerry Tshabalala's technical team.

== Honours ==
Assistant coach

Mamelodi Sundowns Ladies

- SAFA Women's League: 2021, 2022, 2023, 2024, 2025
- COSAFA Women's Champions League: 2021, 2023 Runner-up: 2022
- CAF Women's Champions League: 2021, 2023 Runner-up: 2022

Player

Mamelodi Sundowns Ladies

- SAFA Women's League: 2019-20
- Sasol League National Championship: 2015
