= Lebogang Ramalepe =

South African footballer (born 1991)

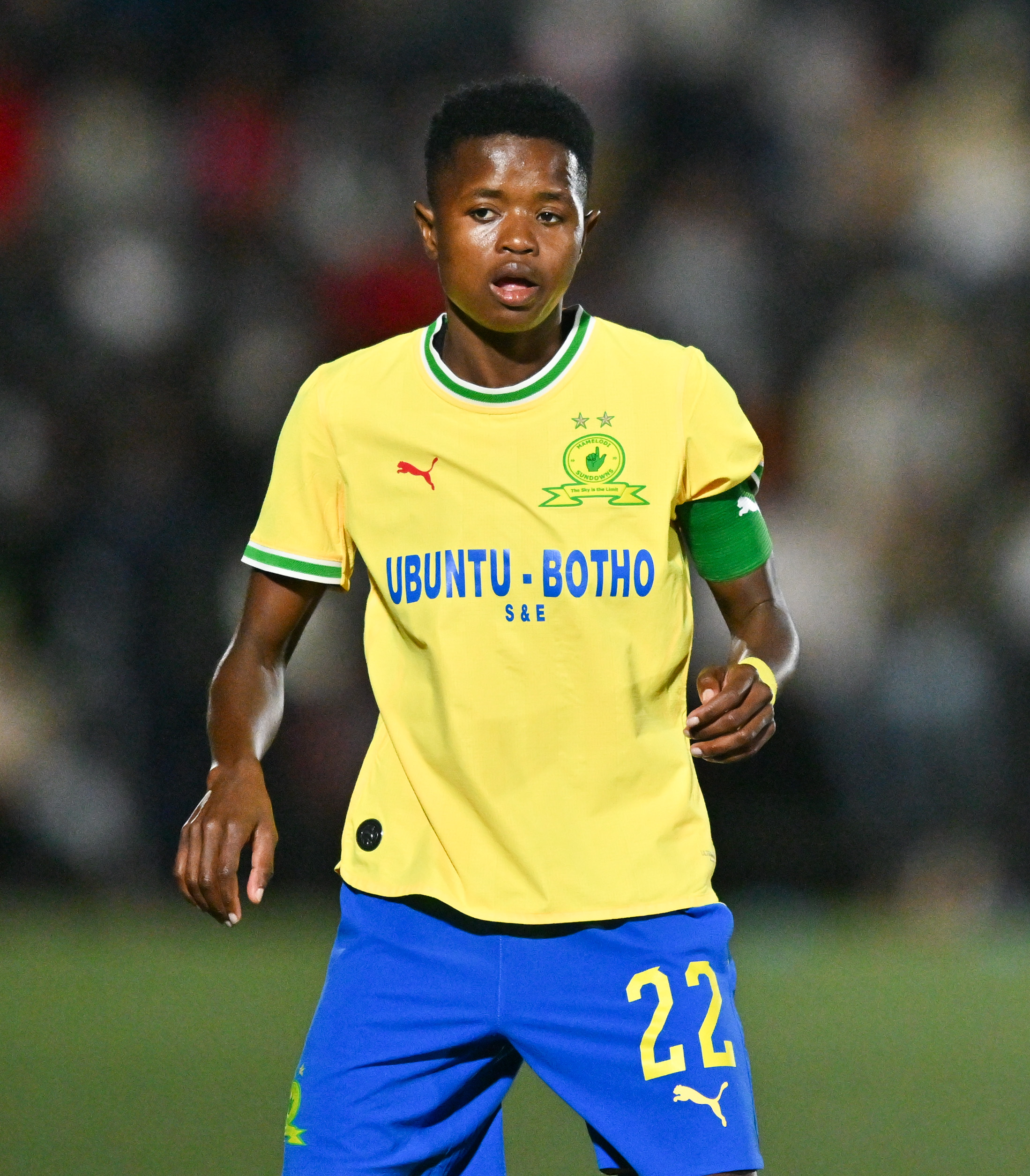
- Ramalepe in 2026

Personal information
- Full name: Lebogang Ester Ramalepe
- Date of birth: 3 December 1991 (age 34)
- Place of birth: Ga-Kgapane, Limpopo, South Africa
- Height: 1.55 m (5 ft 1 in)
- Position: Defender

Team information
- Current team: Mamelodi Sundowns
- Number: 4

Senior career*
Years	Team	Apps	(Gls)
- Kanatla Ladies
2019	Ma-Indies Ladies		
2020–2021	Dinamo Minsk	3	(0)
2023–	Mamelodi Sundowns Ladies	56	(12)

International career^{‡}
2014–	South Africa	100	(4)
Medal record
Representing South Africa
Women's Africa Cup of Nations
Second place	2018 Ghana
First place	2022 Morocco
CAF Women's Champions League
Gold medal – first place	2023 Côte d'Ivoire
COSAFA Women's Champions League
Gold medal – first place	2023 South Africa
Gold medal – first place	2026 Botswana
- * Club domestic league appearances and goals ‡ National team caps and goals as of 20 July 2023 (prior the 2023 FIFA Women's World Cup)

Lebogang Ester Ramalepe (also Lebohang; born 3 December 1991) is a South African professional soccer player who plays as a defender for SAFA Women's League club Mamelodi Sundowns and the South Africa women's national team.

She captained Ma-Indies Ladies to a second-place finish at the 2019 Sasol League National Championship and was voted player of the tournament.

Ramalepe was voted the 2024 SAFA Women's League Player's Player of the Season.

== Club career ==
She captained Ma-Indies Ladies to a second-place finish at the 2019 Sasol League National Championship and was voted player of the tournament.

=== Mamelodi Sundowns Ladies ===
In 2023, she joined SAFA Women's League side Mamelodi Sundowns Ladies.

She won the 2023 CAF Women's Champions League, 2023 COSAFA Women's League and the 2023 Hollywoodbets Super league title with Sundowns.

She was named in the Team of the Tournament for the 2023 CAF Women's Champions League. Later in the year, she was nominated for the CAF Inter-Club Player of the Year (Women) award.

She was voted the 2024 SAFA Women's League Player's Player of the Season.

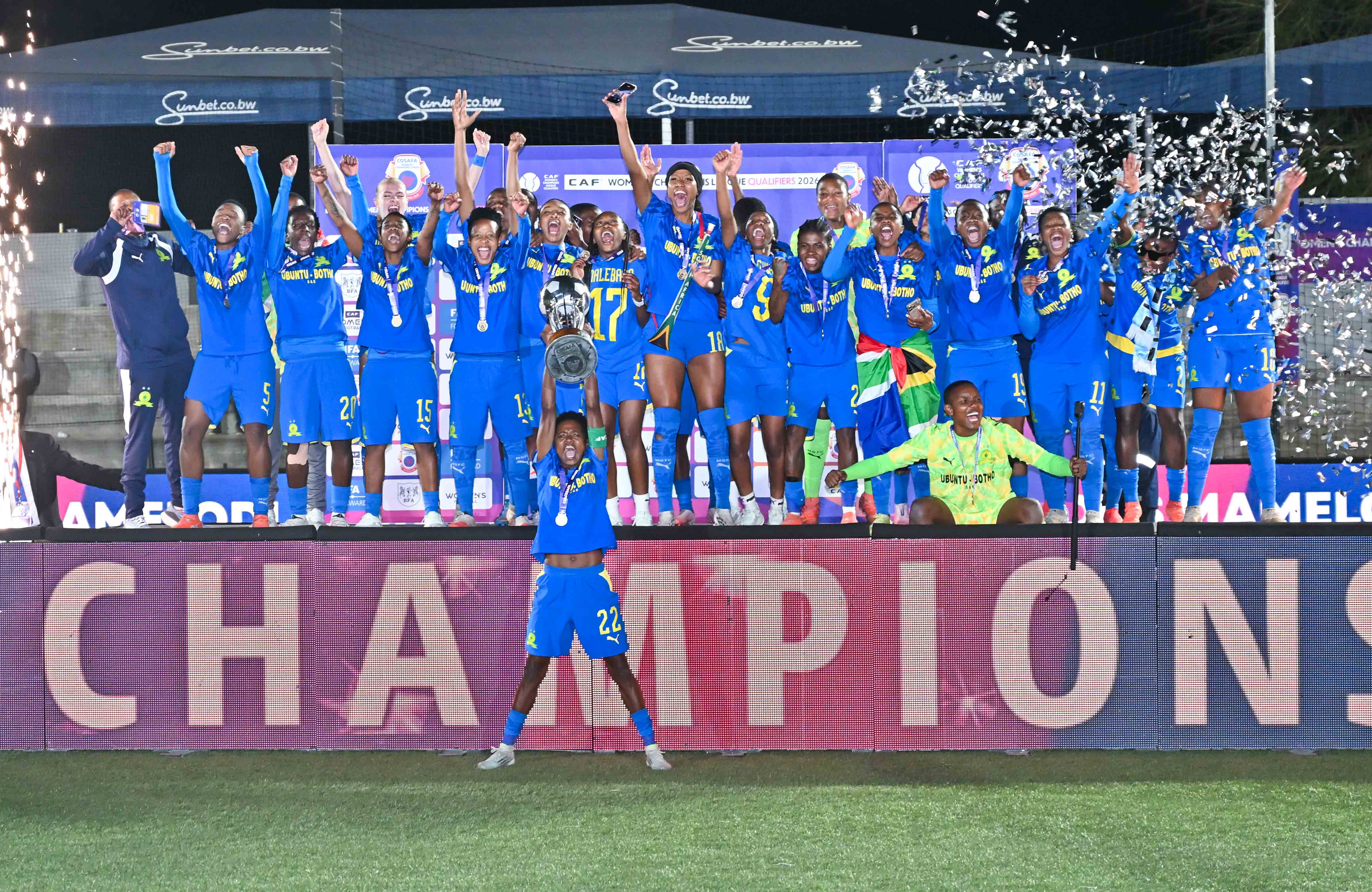
Ramalepe lifts the 2026 CAF Women's Champions League COSAFA Qualifiers trophy

Ramalepe captained the Sundowns team to their third regional title. In the 2026 CAF Women's Champions League, she was named in the group stage best XI.

== International career ==
In September 2014, Ramalepe was named to the roster for the 2014 African Women's Championship in Namibia. She also competed at the 2016 Summer Olympics.

In 2018, she was part of the squad that lost 4–3 on penalties to Nigeria in the 2018 Women's Africa Cup of nations.

In 2019, she was selected to the Banyana Banyana squad that made their World Cup debut at the 2019 FIFA Women's World Cup in France.

In 2022, she was part of the Banyana Banyana squad that won their maiden Women's Africa Cup of Nations title.

In 2023, she was selected for the 2023 FIFA Women's World Cup, in Australia and New Zealand, team that made it to the last 16.

=== International goals ===
No.	Date	Venue	Opponent	Score	Result	Competition
1.	18 July 2015	Dobsonville Stadium, Johannesburg, South Africa	Kenya	1–0	1–0	2015 CAF Women's Olympic qualifying tournament
2.	27 November 2018	Cape Coast Sports Stadium, Cape Coast, Ghana	Mali	2–0	2–0	2018 Women's Africa Cup of Nations
3.	1 March 2019	AEK Arena, Larnaca, Cyprus	North Korea	1–4	1–4	2019 Cyprus Women's Cup
4.	14 July 2025	Honneur Stadium, Oujda, Morocco	Mali	1–0	4–0	2024 Women's Africa Cup of Nations

== Honours ==
South Africa

- Women's Africa Cup of Nations: 2022, runners-up: 2018

=== Ma-Indies Ladies ===
- Sasol League National Championship runners-up: 2019

Mamelodi Sundowns Ladies

- CAF Women's Champions League: 2023
- COSAFA Women's Champions League: 2023, 2026
- SAFA Women's League: 2023, 2024, 2025

Individual

- Sasol League National Championship: 2019 Player of the Tournament
- CAF Women's Champions League: 2023 Team of the Tournament
- CAF Team of the Year Women's XI: 2023 2024
- 2026 CAF Women's Champions League: Group Stage Best XI
