= Kgalebane Mohlakoana =

South African soccer player (born 1993)

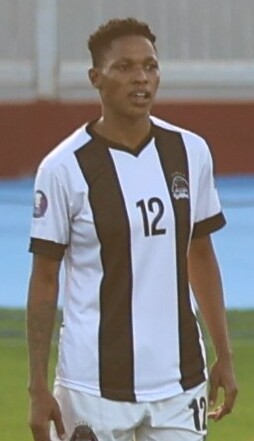
- Mohlakoana during the 2024 CAF WCL final.

Personal information
- Full name: Kgalebane Montebatsi Lydia Mohlakoana
- Date of birth: 10 December 1993 (age 32)
- Position: Midfielder

Team information
- Current team: TP Mazembe
- Number: 12

Senior career*
Years	Team	Apps	(Gls)
–2022	Bloemfontein Celtics Ladies		
2022–2023	Royal AM Women	25	(13)
2024–	TP Mazembe		

International career^{‡}
2018–	South Africa	23	(0)
Medal record
CAF Women's Champions League
Gold medal – first place	2024 Morocco
Bronze medal – third place	2025 Egypt
- * Club domestic league appearances and goals ‡ National team caps and goals as of 11 July 2025

Kgalebane Montebatsi Lydia Mohlakoana (born 10 December 1993) is a South African soccer player who plays as a midfielder for LINAFF club TP Mazembe and the South Africa national team.

== Club career ==
=== Bloemfontein Celtics ===
Mohlakoana played for Bloemfontein Celtic Ladies in the Sasol League where they won the provincial title for four consecutive years starting in 2015 before they were promoted to the newly formed SAFA Women's League in 2019 where they finished in third in the inaugural season.

She was joint top scorer at the 2017 and 2018 Sasol League National Championships.

=== TP Mazembe ===
In 2024 she joined Congolese Women's Championship club TP Mazembe and won the 2024 CAF Women's Champions League with the club.

== International career ==
Mohlakoana competed for the South Africa women's national soccer team at the 2018 Africa Women Cup of Nations, playing in one match.

=== International goals ===
No.	Date	Venue	Opponent	Score	Result	Competition
1.	22 October 2025	Stade des Martyrs, Kinshasa, Democratic Republic of the Congo	DR Congo	1–0	1–1	2026 Women's Africa Cup of Nations qualification

== Honours ==
Bloemfontein Celtics

- SAFA Women's League third: 2019-20
- Sasol League National Championship: 2016, 2017
- Free State Sasol Women's League: 2015, 2016, 2017, 2018

TP Mazembe

- CAF Women's Champions League: 2024, third: 2025

Individual

- 2017 Sasol League National Championships Top Scorer
- 2018 Sasol League National Championships Top Scorer
