= 2015 Sasol League National Championship =

Tournament details
- Country: South Africa
- City: Sasolburg
- Venue: DP de Villiers Stadium
- Dates: 8 December 2015 - 13 December 2015
- Teams: 9

Final positions
- Champions: Mamelodi Sundowns Ladies (2nd title)
- Runners-up: Cape Town Roses
- Third place: Kanatla Ladies
- Fourth place: Durban Ladies

Tournament statistics
- Top goal scorer: Andisiwe Mgcoyi

Awards
- Best player: Lerato Kgasago
- Best young player: Lelona Daweti
- Best goalkeeper: Mpho Teffo

The 2015 Sasol League National Championship was the 7th edition of the Sasol League National Championship since it was formed in 2009. It was held at DP de Villiers Stadium in Sasolburg.

Cape Town Roses were defending champions. They were defeated 5-0 in the final by Mamelodi Sundowns Ladies.

Mamelodi Sundowns Ladies surpassed the goal scoring record (16 goals) set by Cape Town Roses in the 2014 Sasol League National Championship when they defeated Galeshewe Ladies 25-0.

Andisiwe Mgcoyi scored 10 goals in a single match to exceed the previous record of 6 goals set by Nocawe Skiti of Cape Town Roses in 2014.

== Participating teams ==
All nine teams qualified through winning their provincial leagues.

Team	Provincial League
Red Roses Ladies	Eastern Cape Sasol League
Bloemfontein Celtics Ladies	Free State Sasol League
Mamelodi Sundowns Ladies	Gauteng Sasol League
Durban Ladies	KwaZulu Natal Sasol League
Kanatla Ladies	Limpopo Sasol League
Coal City Wizards	Mpumalanga Sasol League
Galeshewe Ladies	Northern Cape Sasol League
ALS Puk Tawana	North West Sasol League
Cape Town Roses	Western Cape Sasol League

== Knockout stages ==
- In the knockout stage, extra-time and a penalty shoot-out will be used to decide the winner if necessary.

=== Bracket ===
Semi-finals
11 December – DP de Villiers Stadium
Cape Town Roses	2
Kanatla Ladies	0
11 December – DP de Villiers Stadium
Mamelodi Sundowns Ladies	7
Durban Ladies	0

Final
13 December – DP de Villiers Stadium
Cape Town Roses	0
Mamelodi Sundowns Ladies	5
Third place
13 December – DP de Villiers Stadium
Kanatla Ladies(p)	1(4)
Durban Ladies	1(1)

=== 7th/8th play off ===
11 December 2015

Coal City Wizards	1–2	Red Roses Ladies

DP de Villiers Stadium

=== 5th/6th play off ===
11 December 2015

Als Puk Tawana	0–1	Bloemfontein Celtic Ladies

DP de Villiers Stadium

=== Semi-finals ===
11 December 2015

Mamelodi Sundowns Ladies	7–0	Durban Ladies

DP de Villiers Stadium
11 December 2015

Cape Town Roses	2–0	Kanatla Ladies

DP de Villiers Stadium

=== 3rd/4th play off ===
13 December 2015

Kanatla Ladies	1–1	Durban Ladies
Penalties
	4-1

DP de Villiers Stadium

=== Final ===
13 December 2015

Mamelodi Sundowns Ladies	5–0	Cape Town Roses
x2 Mgcoyi Nkosi; Nhlapho 89' Missy Sethunya

DP de Villiers Stadium

== Final standings ==
Rank	Team	Prize money
1	Mamelodi Sundowns Ladies	R50 000
2	Cape Town Roses	R35 000
3	Kanatla Ladies	R25 000
4	Durban Ladies	R20 000
5	Bloemfontein Celtics Ladies	R18 000
6	ALS Puk Tawana	R16 000
8	Red Roses Ladies	R14 000
7	Coal City Wizards	R12 000
9	Galeshewe Ladies	R10 000

== Awards ==
The following were rated best in the tournament:

Award	Winner	Club
Diski Queen of the Tournament	Lerato Kgasago	Mamelodi Sundowns Ladies
Queen of Queens of the Tournament	Bongiwe Thusi	Mamelodi Sundowns Ladies
Top goalscorer of the Tournament	Andisiwe Mgcoyi	Mamelodi Sundowns Ladies
Coach of the Tournament	Jerry Tshabalala	Mamelodi Sundowns Ladies
Best goalkeeper	Mpho Teffo	Kanatla Ladies
Young Queen of the Tournament	Lelona Daweti	Cape Town Roses
Referee of the Tournament	Ntombi Bolsiek	
