= 2017 Sasol League National Championship =

Tournament details
- Country: South Africa
- City: Mbombela
- Venue: Kabokweni Stadium
- Dates: 4 December 2017 - 9 December 2017
- Teams: 9

Final positions
- Champions: Bloemfontein Celtics Ladies (2nd title)
- Runners-up: Cape Town Roses
- Third place: Thunderbirds Ladies
- Fourth place: Coal City Wizards

Tournament statistics
- Matches played: 15
- Goals scored: 57 (3.8 per match)
- Top goal scorer(s): Kgalebane Mohlakoana Sisanda Vukapi; Siyamthanda Skeyi (4 goals)

Awards
- Best player: Bambanani Mbane
- Best young player: Yolanda Nduli
- Best goalkeeper: Sedilame Boseja

The 2017 Sasol League National Championship was the 9th edition of the Sasol League National Championship since it was formed in 2009. It was held at Kabokweni Stadium in Mbombela.

The 2017 edition kicked off with an announcement of an increase in the prize money.

Bloemfontein Celtics Ladies were defending champions. They defended their title by defeating Cape Town Roses 2-0 in the final.

== Participating teams ==
All nine teams qualified through winning their provincial leagues.

Team	Provincial League
Thunderbirds Ladies	Eastern Cape Sasol League
Bloemfontein Celtics Ladies	Free State Sasol League
Mamelodi Sundowns Ladies	Gauteng Sasol League
Sunflower WFC	KwaZulu Natal Sasol League
Kanatla Ladies	Limpopo Sasol League
Coal City Wizards	Mpumalanga Sasol League
RC Mills	Northern Cape Sasol League
De’Scorpion	North West Sasol League
Cape Town Roses	Western Cape Sasol League

== Knockout stages ==
=== 3rd/4th play off ===
9 December 2017

Thunderbirds Ladies	2–1	Coal City Wizards

Kabokweni Stadium

=== Final ===
9 December 2017

Cape Town Roses	0–2	Bloemfontein Celtics Ladies
		x2 Kgadiete

Kabokweni Stadium, Mbombela

== Final standings ==
Rank	Team	Prize money
1	Bloemfontein Celtics Ladies	R200 000
2	Cape Town Roses	R100 000
3	Thunderbirds Ladies	R60 000
4	Coal City Wizards	R40 000
5	Sunflower WFC	R30 000
6	Mamelodi Sundowns Ladies	R25 000
7	Kanatla Ladies	R20 000
8	De’Scorpion	R15 000
9	RC Mills	R10 000

== Awards ==
The following were rated best in the tournament:

Award	Winner	Club
Diski Queen of the Tournament	Bambanani Mbane	Bloemfontein Celtics Ladies
Queens Queen of the Tournament	Bambanani Mbane	Bloemfontein Celtics Ladies
Best goalkeeper	Sedilame Boseja	Bloemfontein Celtics Ladies
Young Queen of the Tournament	Yolanda Nduli	Sunflower FC
Coach of the Tournament	Siyabonga Malinga	Sunflower FC
Top goalscorer of the Tournament	Siyamthanda Skeyi	Thunderbirds Ladies
Top goalscorer of the Tournament	Sisanda Vukapi	Cape Town Roses
Top goalscorer of the Tournament	Kgalebane Mohlakoana	Bloemfontein Celtics Ladies
Referee of the Tournament	Joyce Rasekgatle	
