= Jerry Tshabalala =

South African soccer coach

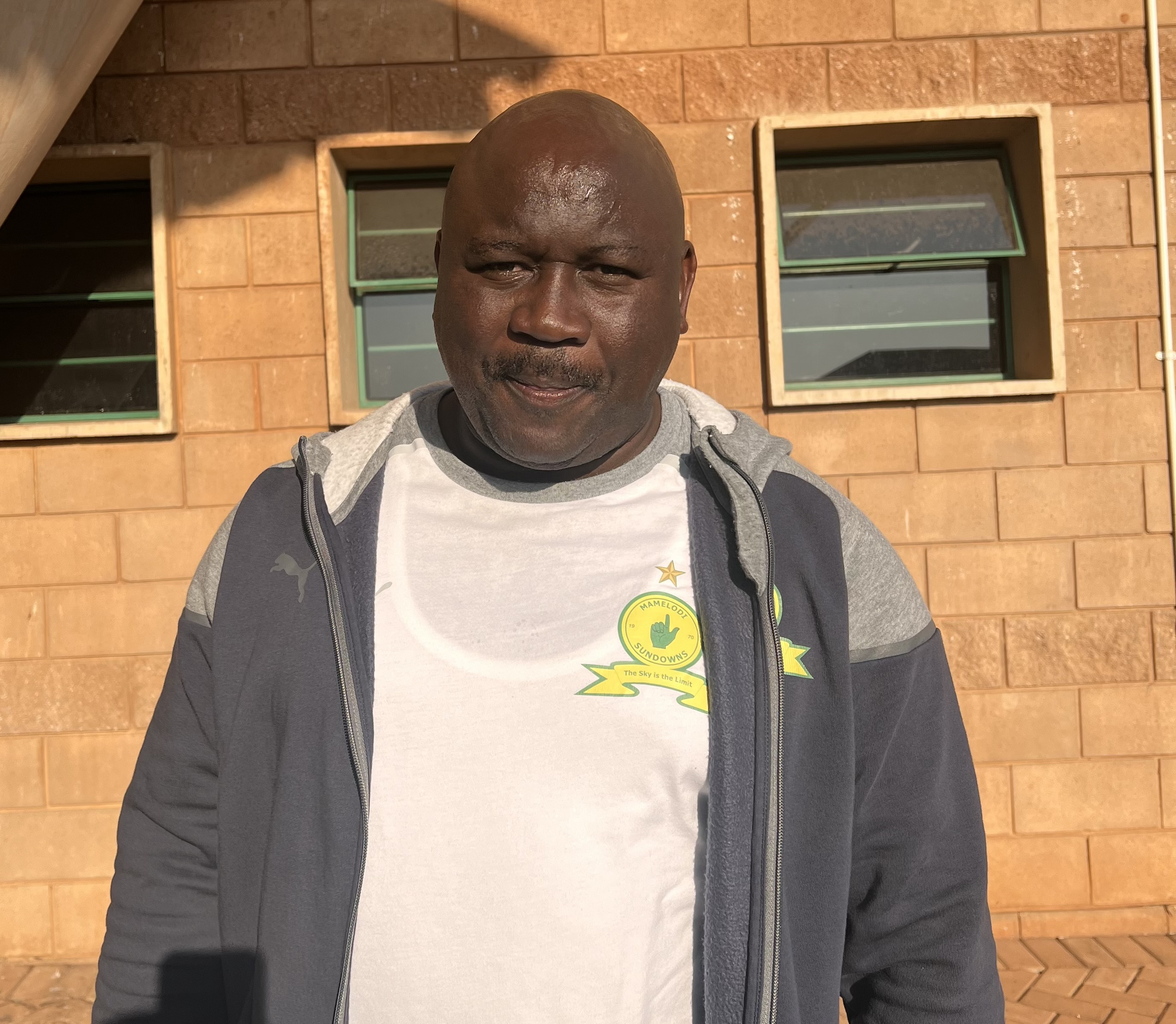
- Tshabalala at Lucas Moripe Stadium

Personal information
- Date of birth: 28 May 1980 (age 46)
- Place of birth: Tembisa, Gauteng

Team information
- Current team: Sporting Club Casablanca (Head Coach)

Managerial career
- Years: Team
- 2012-2024: Mamelodi Sundowns Ladies
- 2025-: Sporting Club Casablanca

Jerry Tshabalala is South African professional soccer manager and current head coach of the Moroccan Women's Championship D1 side Sporting Club Casablanca.

The Tembisa born native is one of the most decorated coaches in African women's football. He won the inaugural CAF Women's Champions League and the 2023 CAF Women's Champions League. He has won a record seven South African women's league titles.

== Coaching career ==
=== Mamelodi Sundowns Ladies ===
In October 2012, Tshabalala became the manager of Mamelodi Sundowns Ladies.

In 2013 he won his first provincial title the Gauteng Sasol League and qualified for the national championship. He won his maiden national title at the 2013 Sasol League National Championship defeating Ma-Indies from Limpopo 2-0 in the final.

In 2015 he was his second Gauteng Sasol League title and the 2015 Sasol League National Championship where he was also named coach of the tournament. His team set a championship record when they defeated Galeshewe Ladies from Northern Cape 25-0.

He won the SAFA Women's League a record four times in 2019-20, 2021, 2022, 2023, and 2024. He was named coach of the year at the SAFA Women's League awards 2021, 2022 and 2024.

In 2021, he won inaugural CAF Women's Champions League 2-0 against Hasaacas Ladies from Ghana making him the first CAF Women's Champions League winning coach. In 2022, his side were runner's up in the 2022 CAF Women's Champions League going down 4-0 to AS FAR from Morocco. He won his second CAF Women's Champions League in the 2023 CAF Women's Champions League 3-0 against Sporting Club Casablanca from Morocco. This made him the first coach to win two CAF Women's Champions League titles.

==== 2023 IFFHS ranking ====
He was ranked 8th in the IFFHS Women's World Best Club Coach in 2023.

=== Sporting Club Casablanca ===
In July 2025, he was appointed manager of Moroccan Women's Championship club Sporting Club Casablanca.

== Honours ==
Mamelodi Sundowns Ladies

- CAF Women's Champions League: 2021, 2023 Runner-up: 2022
- COSAFA Women's Champions League: 2021, 2023 Runner-up: 2022
- SAFA Women's League: 2019-20, 2021, 2022, 2023, 2024
- Sasol League National Championship: 2013, 2015
- Gauteng Sasol League: 2013, 2015
- Joburg Basadi Football Challenge: 2023

Individual

- SAFA Women's League Coach of the Year: 2021, 2022, 2024
- Sasol League National Championship: Coach of the Tournament: 2015
- IFFHS Women's World Best Club Coach 2023: 8th
