= Lerato Kgasago =

South African soccer player (born 1991)

Personal information
- Date of birth: 21 September 1991 (age 35)
- Place of birth: Soweto Gauteng, South Africa
- Height: 1.63 m (5 ft 4 in)
- Position: Midfielder

Senior career*
Years	Team	Apps	(Gls)
2010–2012	ÍBV		
2013–2025	Mamelodi Sundowns Ladies		

International career
2009–2010	South Africa		(13)
2009–2025	South Africa		
- * Club domestic league appearances and goals

Lerato Kgasago (born 21 September 1991) is a former South African soccer player who played as a midfielder.

Kgasago was the 2015 Sasol League National Championship Diski Queen of the Tournament.

== Club career ==
=== IBV Vestmannaeyjar (Women) ===
In 2010, she signed a three-year contract with Úrvalsdeild kvenna side IBV Vestmannaeyjar. They won the 1. deild kvenna in her maiden season.

=== Mamelodi Sundowns Ladies ===
In 2013, she joined Mamelodi Sundowns Ladies. She won the Diski Queen of the Tournament (player of the tournament) award at the 2015 Sasol League National Championship helping Sundowns to their second title.

She was the 2021 and 2023 CAF Women's Champions League titles with the club.

She made the best XI team at the 2022 COSAFA Women's Champions League though her team were runners-up in the tournament.

== Outside Football ==
She was the team manager for the Mamelodi Sundowns Ladies Academy till 2025.

== International career ==
In 2009, Kgasago was part of the Basetsana team selected to take part in the 2010 FIFA U-20 Women's World Cup qualifiers. She scored in the 6–0 win over Zambia from a free-kick.

She was one of three players called for the U/20 team in 2009 that had already made their Banyana Banyana debut. She competed for the women's senior team at the 2015 African Games.

== Honours ==
Club

IBV Vestmannaeyjar (Women)

- 1. deild kvenna: 2010

Mamelodi Sundowns Ladies

- CAF Women's Champions League: 2021, 2023, runners-up: 2022
- COSAFA Women's Champions League: 2021, 2023 runners-up: 2022
- SAFA Women's League: 2019-20, 2021, 2022, 2023, and 2024
- Sasol League National Championship: 2013 and 2015

Individual

- 2015 Sasol League National Championship: Diski Queen of the Tournament
- 2022 COSAFA Women's Champions League: Best XI

Team manager

- VW Vaya Cup: 2022
- Tshwane Regional League: 2024
- Engen Knockout Champ of Champs: 2024
- Gauteng Engen Knockout Challenge: 2024
- Gauteng Women's Soccer Tournament: 2024
