= Bongiwe Thusi =

South African soccer player

Personal information
- Full name: Bongiwe Precious Thusi
- Date of birth: 20 July 1991 (age 35)
- Place of birth: Thembisa, South Africa
- Position: Midfielder

Team information
- Current team: JVW
- Number: 6

Youth career
- –2011: Phomolong Ladies

Senior career*
Years	Team	Apps	(Gls)
2011–2021	Mamelodi Sundowns Ladies		
2022	Malabo Kings		
2024–	JVW		

International career
2013–	South Africa		
- * Club domestic league appearances and goals

Bongiwe Precious Thusi (born 20 July 1991) is a South African soccer player who plays as a midfielder for SAFA Women's League club JVW and the South African women's national team.

Thusi won the Queen of Queens of the Tournament (Player's player award) at the 2015 Sasol League National Championship. She was part of the Mamelodi Sundowns Ladies team that won the inaugural CAF Women's Champions League and SAFA Women's League.

== Club career ==
=== Mamelodi Sundowns Ladies ===
In 2011 she joined Mamelodi Sundowns Ladies. She won the 2013 Sasol League National Championship and 2015 Sasol League National Championship with the club. In 2015 edition she was voted the Queen of Queens of the Tournament.

She was part of the team that won the inaugural CAF Women's Champions League. Thusi scored the winning penalty against Malabo Kings from Equatorial Guinea to send the team to the final.

=== Malabo Kings ===
In 2022 she joined Equatoguinean Primera División femenina side Malabo Kings.

=== JVW ===
She joined SAFA Women's League side JVW in 2024.

== International career ==
Thusi competed for the South Africa women's national soccer team during the 2015 CAF Women's Olympic qualifying tournament. Ten years after her last call up, she made it to the squad to face Morocco in a friendly in December 2025 coming in the 72nd minute.

== Honours ==
Mamelodi Sundowns Ladies

- CAF Women's Champions League: 2021
- SAFA Women's League: 2019-20, 2021
- Sasol League National Championship: 2013, 2015
- Gauteng Sasol Women's League: 2013, 2015

Individual

- 2015 Sasol League National Championship: Queen of Queens of the Tournament.
