= Kaizer Chiefs Ladies F.C. =

Kaizer Chiefs Ladies
- Full name: Kaizer Chiefs Ladies Football Club
- Nicknames: AmaKhosazana The Phefeni Girls The Glamour Girls
- Short name: Chiefs, Chiefs Ladies
- Founded: 2026; 0 years ago
- Stadium: KwaThema Stadium
- Coordinates: 26.1751°S 28.249°E
- Owner: Kaizer Motaung
- Chairman: Kaizer Motaung
- Head Coach: (South Africa) Unathi Mabena
- League: Gauteng Women's Provincial League
- 2026: 3rd
- Website: www.kaizerchiefs.com
Home colours

Kaizer Chiefs Ladies F.C. is a women's soccer club based in Naturena and Kwa-Thema, Gauteng. The team competes in the Gauteng Women's Provincial League, the second tier women's football league in South Africa.

== History ==
Kaizer Chiefs Ladies were officially unveiled on 31 March 2026, marking the club's formal entry into women's football after a multi‑year planning process that began in 2023. During this period, Chiefs developed a structured partnership with Springs Home Sweepers, a Gauteng‑based women's club recognised for its development work under former Banyana Banyana coach Joseph Mkhonza. The collaboration deepened in July 2025, when Chiefs partnered with Home Sweepers to strengthen technical capacity and gain operational experience in the women's game. This process ultimately led to Chiefs acquiring Home Sweepers’ Gauteng Women's Provincial League (then the Gauteng Sasol League) status for the 2026 season, enabling the club to compete in South Africa's second‑tier women's league. The team was based in Naturena (Kaizer Chiefs Village) and Kwa‑Thema Stadium, and was sponsored by Brima Logistics in its formation.

The team played their first match on 11 April 2026, a friendly against Refilwe Ladies at Curro Hazeldean in Pretoria. Under head coach Unathi Mabena, the team recorded a convincing 5–1 victory. Veteran midfielder Mamello Makhabane anchored the side with composure and leadership, while junior internationals Zanele Kunyamane and Katlego Mohale stood out with their pace and clinical finishing.

Amakhosazana, Zulu for Princesses, played their first league match of the 2026 season in the Gauteng Women's Provincial League against defending champions Mamelodi Sundowns Ladies. The fixture marked Chiefs’ competitive debut in the provincial structure and the first official meeting between the two sides, with Chiefs falling to a 2–0 defeat in their inaugural league outing. They ended their debut season in third position winning 22 of their 28 games and only losing twice.

== Players ==
Kaizer Chiefs Ladies F.C. squad for 2026 season.

Note: Flags indicate national team as defined under FIFA eligibility rules; some limited exceptions apply. Players may hold more than one non-FIFA nationality.

No.	Pos.	Nation	Player
30	GK	RSA	Yolula Tsawe
16	GK	RSA	Sesona Busika
12	DF	RSA	Sinenhlanhla Nkosi
13		RSA	Sphiwe Dlamini
17		RSA	Tshiamo Kekana
9	FW	RSA	Unathi Mjijwa
8	MF	RSA	Zanele Kunyamane
25	GK	RSA	Loreta Mokoena
19	MF	RSA	Lumka Qhekeka
15	MF	RSA	Mamello Makhabane
6	MF	RSA	Matobane Moshugi
2	DF	RSA	Meka Rademeyer

No.	Pos.	Nation	Player
7	MF	RSA	Morongwa Sebolai
24	DF	RSA	Neliswe Mchunu
20		RSA	Nkamogeleng Tshoke
4	DF	RSA	Nomfundo Motaung
21		RSA	Nonhlanhla Maci
10	FW	RSA	Boitumelo Mokoena (captain)
22	FW	RSA	Bontle Sebila
23	FW	RSA	Katlego Mohale
21		RSA	Lerato Makhanya
1	GK	RSA	Likhanye Mavumengwana
11	FW	RSA	Bontle Khanye
14		RSA	Sisanda Komane

=== Technical team ===
Position	Staff
Head Coach	(South Africa) Unathi Mabena
Assistant Coach	(South Africa) Justice Khunou

== Club Records ==
=== Gauteng Women's Provincial League record ===
Season	Pos	Record							
Season	Pos	P	W	D	L	F	A	GD	Pst
2026	Third place	28	22	4	2	69	16	53	70

- Orange = In progress
- Gold = Champions
- Silver = Runner up
- Bronze = Third place

==== Gauteng Women's Provincial League statistics ====
- Record number of games won in a season: 22 games (2026)
- Record number of points in a season: 70 points (2026)
- Record goals scored in a season: 69 goals (2026)
- Record for lowest number of goals conceded in a season: 16 goals (2026)
- Record for lowest number of defeats in a season: 2 defeats (2026)
