= Sedilame Boseja =

Motswana footballer

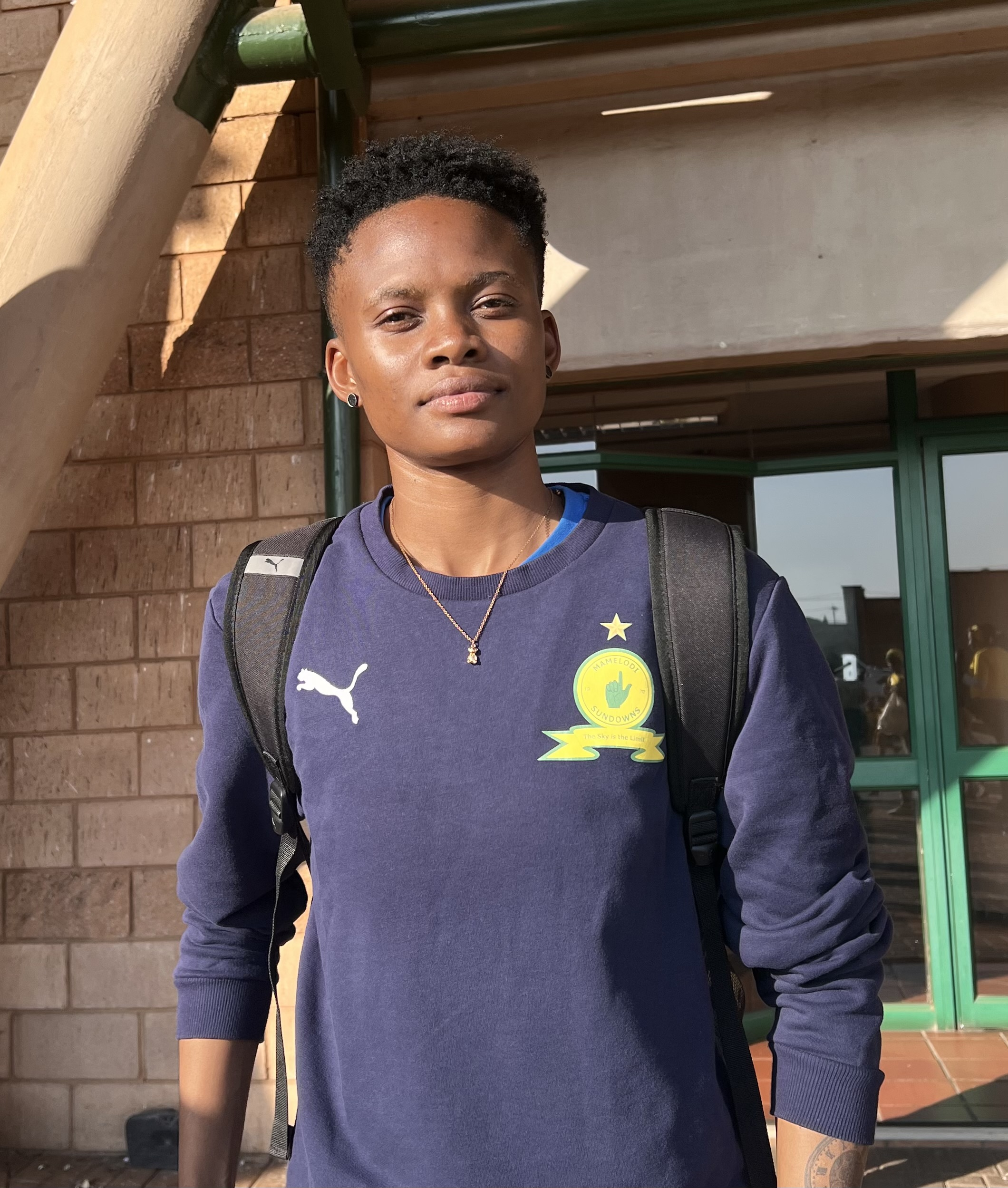
- Boseja in 2024 at Lucas Moripe Stadium

Personal information
- Full name: Maitumelo Sedilame Boseja
- Date of birth: 1 December 1997 (age 28)
- Place of birth: Tutume, Central District, Botswana
- Height: 1.80 m (5 ft 11 in)
- Position: Goalkeeper

Team information
- Current team: Mamelodi Sundowns Ladies
- Number: 1

Senior career*
| Years | Team | Apps | (Gls) |
| 2015–2017 | Township Rollers | | |
| 2017 | Double Action | 1 | (0) |
| 2017–2020 | Bloemfontein Celtic Ladies | | |
| 2021– | Mamelodi Sundowns Ladies | | |

International career^{‡}
| 2012 | Botswana Under-17 | | |
| 2015 | Botswana Under-20 | 2 | (0) |
| ? | Botswana | 21 | (0) |
Medal record
CAF Women's Champions League
| Gold medal – first place | 2021 Egypt |
| Silver medal – second place | 2022 Morocco |
| Gold medal – first place | 2023 Côte d'Ivoire |
COSAFA Women's Champions League
| Gold medal – first place | 2021 South Africa |
| Silver medal – second place | 2022 South Africa |
| Gold medal – first place | 2023 South Africa |
- * Club domestic league appearances and goals ‡ National team caps and goals as of 17 May 2021

Maitumelo Sedilame Boseja (born 1 December 1997), nicknamed Tsontso, is a Motswana footballer who plays as a goalkeeper for Mamelodi Sundowns Ladies F.C. and the Botswana women's national team.

== Early life ==
Boseja was born in the village of Tutume in Botswana's Central District.

== Club career ==
=== Township Rollers ===
In 2015, Boseja began her senior career with the women's team of Township Rollers.

=== Double Action ===
In 2017, Boseja signed with Double Action Ladies.

=== Bloemfontein Celtic Ladies ===
Having only played a single league game for Double Action, South African team Bloemfontein Celtic Ladies signed Boseja on a three-year deal.

In her first season with the team, Celtic won the Free State Region women's football League. They won the 2017 Sasol League National Championship with Boseja named goal keeper of the tournament.

Boseja left Celtic in June 2020.

=== Mamelodi Sundowns Ladies ===
In May 2021, Boseja signed with SAFA Women's League team Mamelodi Sundowns Ladies F.C. In July that year, she tore an anterior cruciate ligament during a training session. The injury ruled her out of Sundowns' run to win the inaugural CAF Women's Champions League, but as a registered squad member for the tournament, she still received a winner's medal.

== International career ==
In 2012, Boseja was capped by the Botswana women's national under-17 football team.

In 2015, Boseja represented Botswana in qualifying for the 2016 FIFA U-20 Women's World Cup, losing 9–1 on aggregate to South Africa over two legs.

As of May 2021, Boseja has won 21 caps with the Botswana national team.

== Honours ==
Bloemfontein Celtic Ladies

- Sasol League National Championship: 2017

=== Mamelodi Sundowns Ladies ===
- SAFA Women's League: 2021, 2022, 2023
- CAF Women's Champions League: 2021, 2023; runner-up: 2022
- COSAFA Women's Champions League: 2021, 2023; runner-up 2022

Individual

- Sasol League National Championship: Goal Keeper of the Tournament: 2017
