= Bambanani Mbane =

South African professional soccer player

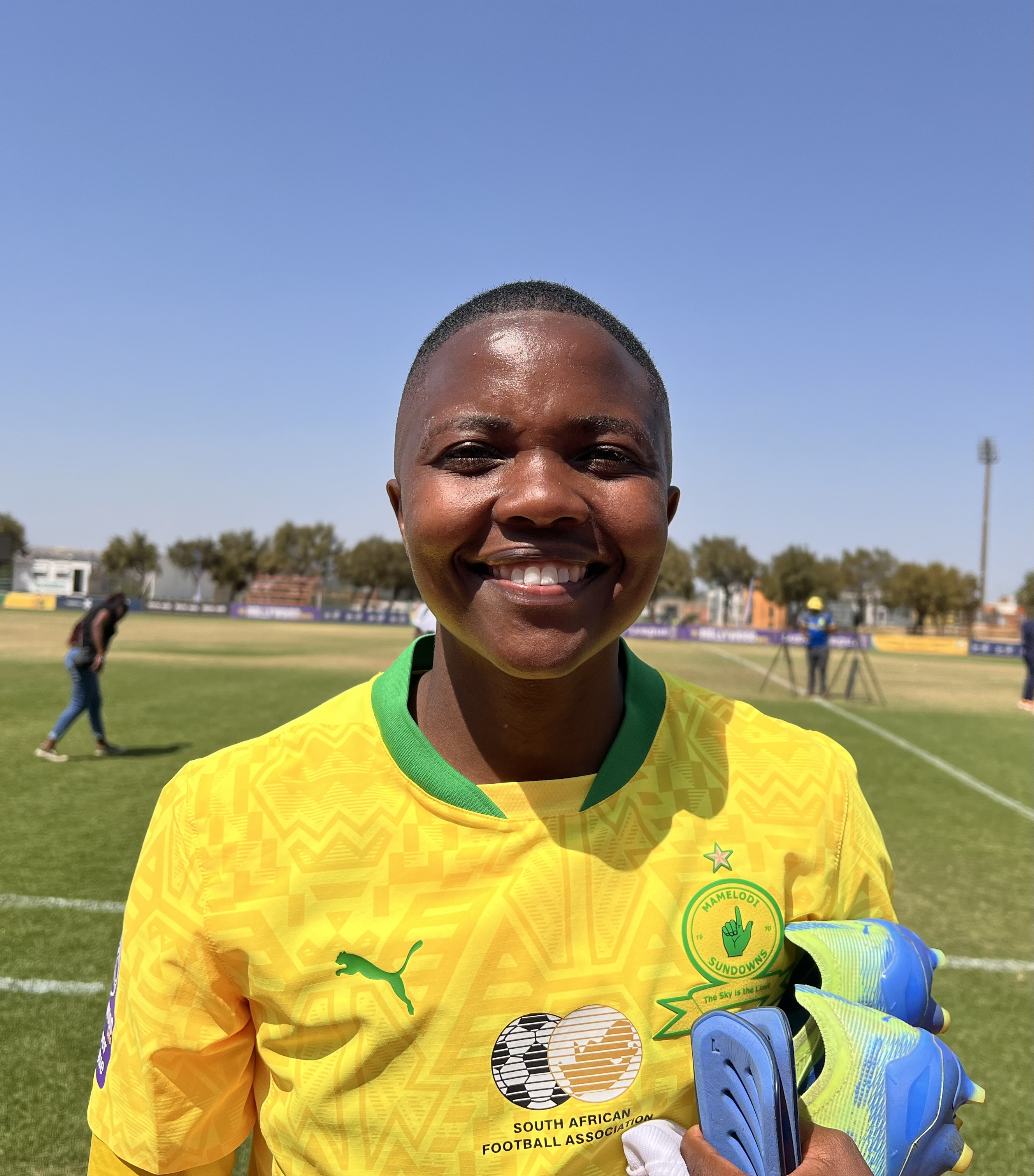
- Mbane at the UJ Soweto Stadium in 2024

Personal information
- Full name: Bambanani Nolufefe Mbane
- Date of birth: 12 March 1990 (age 36)
- Place of birth: Sterkspruit, South Africa
- Height: 1.62 m (5 ft 4 in)
- Positions: Midfielder; defender

Team information
- Current team: Mamelodi Sundowns
- Number: 12

Senior career*
Years	Team	Apps	(Gls)
- Bloemfontein Celtic F.C.
2020	Dinamo Minsk	1	(0)
2021–	Mamelodi Sundowns		

International career
2016–	South Africa	81	(4)
Medal record
Representing South Africa
Women's Africa Cup of Nations
First place	2022 Morocco
Second place	2018 Ghana
CAF Women's Champions League
Gold medal – first place	2021 Egypt
Silver medal – second place	2022 Morocco
COSAFA Women's Champions League
Gold medal – first place	2021 South Africa
Silver medal – second place	2022 South Africa
- * Club domestic league appearances and goals as of 20 July 2023 (prior the 2023 FIFA Women's World Cup)

Bambanani Nolufefe Mbane (born 12 March 1990) is a South African soccer player who plays as a defender for SAFA Women's League club Mamelodi Sundowns and the South Africa women's national team.

In 2017 she was the player of the tournament as well as player's player of the tournament at the 2017 Sasol League National Championship.

In 2021 she was the South African Football Journalists' Association women's footballer of the year as well as the 2021 SAFA Women's League player of the season.

In 2022, she was named in the 2022 CAF Women's Champions League Best XI and the 2022 Women's Africa Cup of Nations Best XI.

In 2023, she was named in the Women's Africa XI announced at the 2023 CAF Awards.

== Club career ==
=== Bloemfontein Celtics Ladies ===
She was part of the Bloemfontein Celtics Ladies squad that won the SAFA Women's League back-to-back during the 2016 and 2017 seasons.

She was named the Queen of the Tournament in 2017.

=== Mamelodi Sundowns Ladies ===
In 2021, Mbane joined Mamelodi Sundowns in South Africa and was part of the team that won the 2021 CAF Women's Champions League and were runner's up for the 2022 CAF Women's Champions League.

She was named the Hollywoodbets Super League: Player of the Season in 2021 and made it to the team of the Year (best XI for 2021). She was also nominated for the 2021 CAF Women Interclub Player of the Year award and 2021 CAF Women Player of the Year.

She rounded out the season by being named the 2021 South African Football Journalists' Association (Safja): Women's footballer of the year.

In 2022, she was added to the 2022 CAF Women's Champions League Best XI and the Women's Africa Cup of Nations Best XI.

In 2023, she was added to the Women's Africa XI announced at the 2023 CAF Awards.

== International career ==
Mbane competed for the South Africa women's national soccer team at the 2018 Africa Women Cup of Nations were they finished in second place.

She was part of the South African women's national team at the 2022 Women's Africa Cup of Nations where they won their first continental title and the 2023 FIFA Women's World cup where they reached the last 16.

Mbane was the woman of the match in a 2–0 win over Ghana at the 2024 Women's Africa Cup of Nations.

=== International goals ===
No.	Date	Venue	Opponent	Score	Result	Competition
1.	31 July 2019	Wolfson Stadium, KwaZakele, South Africa	Comoros	7–0	17–0	2019 COSAFA Women's Championship
2.	31 July 2019	Wolfson Stadium, KwaZakele, South Africa	Comoros	9–0	17–0	2019 COSAFA Women's Championship
3.	8 August 2019	Wolfson Stadium, KwaZakele, South Africa	Zimbabwe	1–0	3–1	2019 COSAFA Women's Championship
4.	11 July 2025	Honneur Stadium, Oujda, Morocco	Tanzania	1–1	1–1	2024 Women's Africa Cup of Nations
5.	27 July 2026	Moulay Rachid Stadium, Casablanca, Morocco	Tanzania	1–1	1–2	2026 Women's Africa Cup of Nations

== Personal life ==
In 2019, she married Tsholofelo Makgaleme.

== Honours ==
Club

- SAFA Women's League: 2021, 2022, 2023
- Sasol Women's League: 2016, 2017,
- CAF Women's Champions League: 2021 runner-up: 2022

South Africa

- Women's Africa Cup of Nations: 2022, runner-up: 2018

Individual

- Sasol Queen of the Tournament: 2017
- Sasol Queen of Queens: 2017
- SAFA Women's League Player of the Season: 2021
- 2021 South African Football Journalists' Association (Safja): Women's footballer of the year
- Women's Africa Cup of Nations Team of the Tournament: 2022
- IFFHS CAF Women's Team of The Year: 2022
- Women's Africa XI: 2023
