= Yolula Tsawe =

South African professional soccer player

Personal information
- Date of birth: 23 June 1992 (age 34)
- Place of birth: Mthatha, Eastern Cape, South Africa
- Height: 1.69 m (5 ft 7 in)
- Position: Goalkeeper

Team information
- Current team: Kaizer Chiefs Ladies F.C.
- Number: 30

Youth career
- –: Coastal United

Senior career*
Years	Team	Apps	(Gls)
–	Mamelodi Sundowns Ladies F.C.		
–2016	Tshwane University of Technology		
2016–2022	JVW		
2023–2025	TS Galaxy Queens		
2026–	Kaizer Chiefs Ladies F.C.		

International career
2010–	South Africa		
Medal record
Representing South Africa
Women's Africa Cup of Nations
Third place	2010 South Africa
- * Club domestic league appearances and goals

Yolula Tsawe (born 23 June 1992) is a South African professional soccer player who plays as a goalkeeper for Sasol Women's League side Kaizer Chiefs Ladies and the South Africa women's national team.

She was the goalkeeper of the tournament at the 2016 and 2019 Sasol League National Championship.

== Club career ==
=== JVW ===
In 2016, she joined JVW F.C. and was part of the squad that won the two Gauteng Sasol Women's League in 2016 and 2019 and went on to win their maiden Sasol League National Championship in 2019 after being runners-ups in 2016. For her efforts in the team she was named goalkeeper of the tournament in 2016 and 2019 national championships. In her final season with the club, she kept 3 clean sheets for the 2022 season.

=== TS Galaxy Queens ===
In February 2023, she joined SAFA Women's League side TS Galaxy Queens. She kept 4 clean sheets in her debut season with the club whilst playing as their second choice keeper.

=== Kaizer Chiefs Ladies ===
Tsawe was one of the 24 players signed by the newly formed Kaizer Chiefs Ladies in March 2026.

== International career ==
Tsawe competed for the South African women's national team at the 2010 African Women's Championship where they won a bronze medal. She was also selected for the 2016 Women's Africa Cup of Nations where the team finished in fourth position.

== Honours ==
South Africa

- African Women's Championship third place: 2010

JVW

- Sasol League National Championship: 2019; runners-up: 2016
- Gauteng Sasol Women's League: 2016, 2019

Individual

- 2016 Sasol League National Championship: Goalkeeper of the Tournament
- 2019 Sasol League National Championship: Goalkeeper of the Tournament
