= Coal City Wizards F.C. =

Coal City Wizards
- Full name: Coal City Wizards Football Club
- Founded: 1998
- Ground: Witbank Stadium
- Capacity: 15 000
- Coordinates: 25°53′02″S 29°12′52″E
- Founder: Mabu Selby Moroaswi
- Chairlady: Gugu Moroaswi
- League: Sasol Women's League
- 2024: SAFA Women's League, 5th (Mpumalanga, Stream A)

Coal City Wizards Football Club is a women's soccer club based in eMalahleni, Mpumalanga. The team competes in the Sasol Women's League, the second tier women's football league in South Africa.

== History ==
The club was founded in 1998 by Mabu Moroaswi who served as chairman and coach till his death in 2023.

In 2015 they won the Mpumalanga Sasol Women's League title and qualified for the 2015 Sasol League National Championship were they finished in 7th.

They defended their Mpumalanga Sasol Women's League title in 2016 and qualified for the 2016 Sasol League National Championship were they finished in fourth after losing the third place match 4-2 via penalties to Kanatla Ladies after the match ended in a 2–2 draw.

They defended their Mpumalanga Sasol Women's League title for the third time in 2017 and qualified for the 2017 Sasol League National Championship were finished in fourth again this time going down to Thunderbirds Ladies 2–1 in the third place match.

They defended their Mpumalanga Sasol Women's League title for the fourth successive time in 2018 and qualified for the 2018 Sasol League National Championship and finished in 7th.

The club is a founding member of the SAFA Women's League and finished in 5th in the inaugural 2019-20 season.

In 2023 the club lost their coach and chairman Mabu Moroaswi and struggled in the 2023 season leading them to being relegated to the Sasol Women's League at the end of the season after finishing in 15th. Gugu Moroaswi was elected chairlady in 2023.

== Honours ==
- Mpumalanga Sasol Women's League: 2015, 2016, 2017, 2018
- Sasol League National Championship: Fourth: 2016

== SAFA Women's League record ==
Season	Pos	Record							
Season	Pos	P	W	D	L	F	A	GD	Pst
2019-20	5th place	22	8	8	6	38	38	0	32
2021	12th place	26	6	5	15	25	39	(14)	23
2022	13th place	30	7	2	21	34	63	(29)	23
2023	15th place	30	5	2	23	32	104	(72)	17

- Red = Relegated
- Gold = Champions
- Silver = Runner up
