= 2013 Sasol League National Championship =

Tournament details
- Country: South Africa
- City: Klerksdorp
- Venue: Alabama Stadium
- Dates: 26 November 2013 - 1 December 2013
- Teams: 9

Final positions
- Champions: Mamelodi Sundowns Ladies (1st title)
- Runners-up: Ma-Indies Ladies
- Third place: Bloemfontein Celtic Ladies
- Fourth place: Cape Town Roses

Tournament statistics
- Top goal scorer: Noko Matlou

Awards
- Best player: Busisiwe Ndimeni
- Best young player: Noxolo Cesane
- Best goalkeeper: Andile Dlamini

The 2013 Sasol League National Championship was the 5th edition of the Sasol League National Championship since it was formed in 2009. It was held at Alabama Stadium in Klerksdorp.

Mamelodi Sundowns Ladies won 2-0 in the final against Ma-Indies Ladies. Bloemfontein Celtics Ladies claimed bronze defeating Cape Town Roses 2-0 in the 3rd/4th playoffs.

== Participating teams ==
All nine teams qualified through winning their provincial leagues.

Team	Provincial League
City Lads	Eastern Cape Sasol League
Bloemfontein Celtics Ladies	Free State Sasol League
Mamelodi Sundowns Ladies	Gauteng Sasol League
Durban Ladies	KwaZulu Natal Sasol League
Ma-Indies Ladies	Limpopo Sasol League
eMpumalanga Ladies	Mpumalanga Sasol League
Royal Wizards	Northern Cape Sasol League
ALS Puk Tawana	North West Sasol League
Cape Town Roses	Western Cape Sasol League

== Knockout stages ==
=== 3rd/4th play off ===
1 December

Bloemfontein Celtic Ladies	2–0	Cape Town Roses

Alabama Stadium

=== Final ===
1 December

Mamelodi Sundowns Ladies	2–0	Ma-Indies Ladies

Alabama Stadium, Klerksdorp

== Final standings ==
Rank	Team	Prize money
1	Mamelodi Sundowns Ladies	R50 000
2	Ma-Indies Ladies	R35 000
3	Bloemfontein Celtics Ladies	R25 000
4	Cape Town Roses	R20 000

== Awards ==
The following were rated best in the tournament:

Award	Winner	Club
Diski Queen of the Tournament	Busisiwe Ndimeni	Mamelodi Sundowns Ladies
Best goalkeeper	Andile Dlamini	Mamelodi Sundowns Ladies
Top goalscorer of the Tournament	Noko Matlou	Ma-Indies Ladies
Coach of the Tournament	Rhulani Mathebula	Ma-Indies Ladies
Young Queen of the Tournament	Noxolo Cesane	Cape Town Roses
Referee of the Tournament	Sebabatso Malope	
