= KwaThema Stadium =

Multi-use stadium in KwaThema, Gauteng, South Africa

- Location: KwaThema, Gauteng

KwaThema Stadium is a multi-use stadium in KwaThema, Gauteng, South Africa. It is currently used mostly for football matches and is the home venue of Valencia FC in the ABC Motsepe League.
