= Ga-Kgapane =

- Location within Limpopo Location within South Africa
- Coordinates: 23.649°S 30.226°E
- Country: South Africa
- Province: Limpopo
- District: Mopani
- Municipality: Greater Letaba

Area
  - Total: 3.83 km^{2} (1.48 sq mi)
- Elevation: 709 m (2,326 ft)

Population (2011)
  - Total: 30,000
  - Density: 7,800/km^{2} (20,000/sq mi)

Racial makeup (2011)
  - Black African: 99.4%
  - Coloured: 0.2%
  - Indian/Asian: 0.2%
  - White: 0.1%
  - Other: 0.1%

First languages (2011)
  - Northern Sotho: 86.6%
  - Tsonga: 3.6%
  - Sotho: 2.7%
  - English: 1.9%
  - Other: 5.2%
- Time zone: UTC+2 (SAST)
- Postal code (street): 0838

Ga-Kgapane is a township in Mopani District Municipality in the Limpopo province of South Africa located northeastern of Modjadjiskloof. It is the only township in the Modjajiskloof. It is also the area where you can find the magistrates court, police station, hospital, post office, and some of the biggest retail shops. The main language spoken is KheLobedu.

Notable people include Mahlatse Makhonenyane, a recognized network engineer that designed Letaba internet service provider Network for the township, and Tumelo Rampedi, a former member of Economic Freedom Fighters.
