= Portia Modise =

South African soccer player (born 1983)

Personal information
- Full name: Portia Modise
- Date of birth: 20 June 1983 (age 43)
- Place of birth: Soweto, South Africa
- Height: 1.63 m (5 ft 4 in)
- Positions: Midfielder; forward

Youth career
- Soweto Rangers
- Jomo Cosmos

Senior career*
Years	Team	Apps	(Gls)
1996–?	Soweto Ladies		
2007–2009	Fortuna Hjørring		
2009–2012?	Palace Super Falcons		
2014–2015	Croesus Ladies		

International career^{‡}
2000–2015	South Africa	124	(101)
Medal record
Women's Football
Representing South Africa
African Championships
Silver medal – second place	2000 South Africa	South Africa
- * Club domestic league appearances and goals as of 13:38, 16 October 2010 (UTC) ‡ National team caps and goals as of 9 April 2016

Portia Modise (born 20 June 1983) is a South African footballer who was named Player of the Championship at the 2006 Women's African Football Championship. She represented the South Africa national team at the 2012 London Olympics. She became the first African player to score 100 international goals.

== Club career ==
Modise was born in Soweto (Meadowlands) and started playing football with the boys in her neighbourhood. She chose football ahead of netball at school, and began playing with Soweto Rangers at under-10 level. After playing for Rangers and the women's section of Jomo Cosmos, Modise moved to Soweto Ladies in 1996. She has two brothers.

Comfortable in either a midfield or forward role, Modise was nicknamed "Bashin" after the male footballer Albert "Bashin" Mahlangu. In the 2001–02 regular season, Modise scored 51 goals for Soweto Ladies, adding two more in the 4–0 National Championship final win over Cape Town Pirates.

In 2003 Modise was invited to trials with Arsenal Ladies. A dispute over sponsorship and funding left Modise and compatriots Toni Carelse and Veronica Phewa unable to sign for the English club despite impressing manager Vic Akers during the trials.

In 2005–06 Modise was employed by Orlando Pirates as an academy coach. She left after seven months in February 2006 following a disagreement with her boss Augusto Palacios.

In June 2007 Modise signed a two-year deal with Fortuna Hjørring in Denmark's Elitedivisionen, after impressing during an initial one-month contract. In South Africa she represented Orlando Pirates, Jomo Cosmos F.C. and Palace Super Falcons.

In 2009, she signed a six-month contract at Palace Super Falcons in South Africa. In 2012, she also played there.

She wasn't part of the initial training camp for the 2014 African Women's Championship squad, because she was playing 'under the radar' outside of South Africa, in deed for a men's team. After the new coach was made aware of her, she switched clubs and played for Croesus Ladies back in South Africa.

== National team career ==
Modise was captain of the South Africa under-19 national team (Basetsane Basetsane) when she was called into the senior squad (Banyana Banyana). In the 2000 Women's African Football Championship, she featured in all South Africa's games, scoring her first goal against Zimbabwe as well as playing in the tournament final, a defeat to Nigeria which was marred by crowd violence.

In 2005, Modise was one of two African footballers, alongside Perpetua Nkwocha, to be nominated for the Women's FIFA World Player of the Year, which was won by Birgit Prinz.

At the 2006 Women's African Football Championship, she scored a goal in the third place final playing for South Africa against Cameroon, and was named Player of the Championship. She was also voted in the top three for the 2006 CAF Women's Footballer of the Year award, and was selected to play for the All-Stars squad in the match preceding the official draw for the 2007 FIFA Women's World Cup.

In November 2008 Modise announced she would no longer play for South Africa, after a breakdown in her working relationship with coach August Makalakalane. She was recalled in April 2012 by new national coach Joseph Mkhonza, after Makalakalane had been sacked amidst allegations of sexual harassment and homophobia.

Modise had 71 goals in 92 international caps heading into the 2012 Olympic football tournament. In South Africa's first match at the games, a 4–1 defeat to Sweden in Coventry, Modise scored a goal from inside the centre circle. FIFA.com reported that the "stunning" goal was acclaimed by the entire stadium, including the Swedish supporters.

October 2012 saw Modise named in the South African squad for the 2012 African Women's Championship. It was reported that she could reach her milestone 100th appearance during the tournament, should Banyana Banyana reach the semi-finals. Modise played a key role in South Africa's run to the final, where they were beaten by Equatorial Guinea.

In October 2014 Portia Modise became the first African player to reach the elusive 100-goal barrier in international football, when she scored her 99th and 100th goal in South Africa's 5–1 victory against Algeria at the CAF African Women's Championship.

On 19 May 2015, she announced her retirement from international football, after playing 124 matches and scoring 101 goals for South Africa.

== International goals ==
No.	Date	Venue	Opponent	Score	Result	Competition
1.	25 October 2003	Pretoria, South Africa	Namibia	8–0	13–0	2004 Summer Olympics qualification
2.	1 February 2004	South Africa	Angola	4–1	6–2	2004 Summer Olympics qualification
3.	1 February 2004	South Africa	Angola	5–1	6–2	2004 Summer Olympics qualification
4.	1 February 2004	South Africa	Angola	6–2	6–2	2004 Summer Olympics qualification
5.	14 February 2004	Luanda, Angola	Angola	1–1	2–3	2004 Summer Olympics qualification
6.	12 March 2004	South Africa	Nigeria	1–2	2–2	2004 Summer Olympics qualification
7.	12 March 2004	South Africa	Nigeria	2–2	2–2	2004 Summer Olympics qualification
8.	21 September 2004	Pretoria, South Africa	Zimbabwe	1–0	1–2	2004 African Women's Championship
9.	22 August 2006	Lusaka, Zambia	Lesotho	2–0	9–0	2006 COSAFA Women's Championship
10.	22 August 2006	Lusaka, Zambia	Lesotho	5–0	9–0	2006 COSAFA Women's Championship
11.	24 August 2006	Lusaka, Zambia	Malawi	2–0	3–0	2006 COSAFA Women's Championship
12.	25 August 2006	Lusaka, Zambia	Zimbabwe	1–0	4–1	2006 COSAFA Women's Championship
13.	26 August 2006	Lusaka, Zambia	Namibia	1–1	3–1	2006 COSAFA Women's Championship
14.	26 August 2006	Lusaka, Zambia	Namibia	3–1	3–1	2006 COSAFA Women's Championship
15.	10 November 2006	Oleh, Nigeria	Cameroon	1–0	2–2 (5–4 p)	2006 African Women's Championship
72.	25 July 2012	Coventry, England	Sweden	1–3	1–4	2012 Summer Olympics
95.	23 May 2014	Mitsamiouli, Comoros	Comoros	1–0	13–0	2014 African Women's Championship qualification
96.	23 May 2014	Mitsamiouli, Comoros	Comoros	2–0	13–0	2014 African Women's Championship qualification
97.	23 May 2014	Mitsamiouli, Comoros	Comoros	5–0	13–0	2014 African Women's Championship qualification
98.	23 May 2014	Mitsamiouli, Comoros	Comoros	6–0	13–0	2014 African Women's Championship qualification
99.	18 October 2014	Windhoek, Namibia	Algeria	2–0	5–1	2014 African Women's Championship
100.	18 October 2014	Windhoek, Namibia	Algeria	5–0	5–1	2014 African Women's Championship
101.	11 April 2015	Johannesburg, South Africa	Botswana	2–0	5–0	2015 African Games qualification

== Personal life ==
In March 2005, Ria Ledwaba, head of the women's committee at the South African Football Association (SAFA), announced plans to send players to etiquette workshops and supply tighter kit to increase their femininity. As captain of the national team Modise publicly rejected the proposals and made an outspoken attack on the committee: "We need sponsors but all the committee does is raise less important issues because they have failed to transform the sport."

During the dispute with Ledwaba, Modise had declined to reveal her own sexual orientation: "My private life is my business." In 2011, she appeared in a television documentary which highlighted the plight of lesbians (particularly Black lesbians) in South Africa, who live in fear of "corrective rape", violence and murder. Modise told the programme makers she did not venture out alone at night: "I know how dangerous it is to live as a black lesbian in South Africa."

== Controversy ==
After a 0–0 draw with Nigeria that meant South Africa failed to qualify for the 2024 Summer Olympics, Modise accused South Africa coach Desiree Ellis of favouring Coloureds in her squad selections simply because Ellis herself is Coloured, claiming that Coloureds "can't jam". These comments were widely criticised as racist and inaccurate. In reality, 10 of the 11 players in the starting 11 for the match were Black, with the one exception being Coloured goalkeeper Kaylin Swart who kept a clean sheet during the match.

== See also ==
- List of top international women's football goal scorers by country
- List of women's footballers with 100 or more international caps
- List of women's footballers with 100 or more international goals
