= 2019 Sasol League National Championship =

Tournament details
- Country: South Africa
- City: Tsakane
- Venue: Tsakane Stadium
- Dates: 3 December 2019 - 8 December 2019
- Teams: 9

Final positions
- Champions: JVW (1st title)
- Runners-up: Ma-Indies Ladies
- Third place: Sunflower WFC
- Fourth place: Royal Wizards

Tournament statistics
- Top goal scorer(s): Neliswa Luthuli; 13 goals

Awards
- Best player: Lebogang Ramalepe
- Best young player: Banele Madondo
- Best goalkeeper: Yolula Tsawe

The 2019 Sasol League National Championship was the 11th edition of the Sasol League National Championship since it was formed in 2009. It was held at Tsakane Stadium in Tsakane.

This was the last season were the Sasol League National Championship would crown the women's national soccer champion after the formation of the new first tier league, the SAFA Women's League.

From this season onwards, the two finalists would be promoted to the SAFA Women's League. The semi-finals to determine who gains entry into the new national league were held on 6 December 2019. Royal Wizards became the first Northern Cape provincial winner to make it to the knockout stages of the competition since its formation in 2009.JVW defeated Royal Wizards 10–0 in the first semi-final and Ma-Indies Ladies defeated Sunflower WFC 2–1 in the second semi-final to become the first two teams to gain promotion.

TUT Ladies were defending champions. As the 2018 champions, they were playing in the inaugural SAFA Women's League which had started in August 2019. The new league would then take over in crowning the women's national soccer champion by crowning the 2020 champion. JVW were crowned champions after defeating Ma-Indies Ladies 2–0 in the final.

== Participating teams ==
All nine teams qualified through winning their provincial leagues.

Team	Provincial League
Executive Ladies	Eastern Cape Sasol League
Ixias Ladies	Free State Sasol League
JVW	Gauteng Sasol League
Sunflower WFC	KwaZulu Natal Sasol League
Ma-Indies Ladies	Limpopo Sasol League
Nkomasi Ladies	Mpumalanga Sasol League
Royal Wizards	Northern Cape Sasol League
Royal Queens	North West Sasol League
Vasco Da Gama	Western Cape Sasol League

== Knockout stages ==
=== 3rd/4th play off ===
8 December 2019

Sunflower WFC	16–0	Royal Wizards

Tsakane Stadium

=== Final ===
8 December 2019

JVW	2–0	Ma-Indies Ladies
Salgado; Nicole Irwin

Tsakane Stadium, Tsakane

== Final standings ==
Rank	Team	Prize money
1	JVW	R200 000
2	Ma-Indies Ladies	R100 000
3	Sunflower WFC	R60 000
4	Royal Wizards	R40 000

== Awards ==
The following were rated best in the tournament:

Award	Winner	Club
Player of the Tournament	Lebogang Ramalepe	Ma-Indies Ladies
Best goalkeeper	Yolula Tsawe	JVW
Young player of the Tournament	Banele Madondo	Sunflower WFC
Top goalscorer of the Tournament	Neliswa Luthuli	Sunflower WFC
