= Palace Super Falcons Women's Academy =

Palace Super Falcons
- Full name: Palace Super Falcons Women's Academy and Football Club
- Founded: 2002; 24 years ago
- Ground: Tembisa, Ekurhuleni, Gauteng
- Owner: Palace Group
- Chairman: Jabu Mabaso
- League: SAFA Women's Regional League

Palace Super Falcons is a South African women's association football club that plays in the SAFA Women's Regional League, the third tier in South African women's soccer.

They are three time national champions having won the title in 2010, 2011, and 2012.

== History ==
Palace Group formed Palace Super Falcons Women's Academy in 2002. Aiming to develop women soccer and young girls socially and to decrease their involvement in criminal activity, substance abuse and other social ill by participating in sport. The Palace Group also has a youth academy which provided for junior players from previously disadvantaged backgrounds in townships around Midrand. Both senior and junior players are actively participating in competitive women's football competitions around Gauteng.

Palace Super Falcons won the 2010 Sasol League National Championships beating defending champions, Detroit Ladies, 4–2 in a penalty shoot-out after the match ended in a 2–2 draw. The match was broadcast on SABC 1 on 23 May 2010. It was attended by football personalities like Doctor Khumalo and the President of SAFA, Kirsten Nematandani.

== Honours ==
- Sasol League National Championships: 2010, 2011, 2012

== Notable players ==
=== Summer Olympics participants ===
List of players that were called up for the Summer Olympic Games while playing for Palace Super Falcons. In brackets, the tournament played:

- (South Africa) Nothando Vilakazi (2012)
- (South Africa) Janine van Wyk (2012)
- (South Africa) Portia Modise (2012)
