= 2022 CAF Women's Champions League qualification =

Qualification phase for the 2022 CAF Women's Champions League

Tournament details
- Host countries: Morocco (North Zone); Liberia (West A Zone); Ivory Coast (West B Zone); Cameroon (Central Zone); Tanzania (Central-East Zone); South Africa (South Zone)
- Dates: 7 August – 15 September 2022

Tournament statistics
- Matches played: 45
- Goals scored: 160 (3.56 per match)

Qualification for the 2022 CAF Women's Champions League began on 7 August and concluded on 15 September 2022.

Qualification began COSAFA for Southern Africa and the CECAFA for mostly East Africa and a bit of Central Africa on 7 August 2022 and concluded on 16 September 2022. After qualification, the participating teams reduced to the final 8 which were made up of one winning team each from the 6 CAF sub-confederations (WAFU is split into two zones), the tournament's defending champions and the host nation's league-winning team. These 8 teams would proceed to the main tournament phase which took place in Morocco.

== Teams ==
All participating teams qualified for the qualification phase via winning their respective national league titles and had their club licensing applications accepted by CAF. A total of 33 (out of 54) countries had a participant club in this edition.

Qualified teams for the 2022 CAF Women's Champions League qualification phase
Zones		Teams			
UNAF		(Algeria) Afak Relizane (2nd)	(Egypt) Wadi Degla (2nd)	(Morocco) AS FAR^{TH} (2nd)	(Tunisia) AS Banque de l'Habitat (2nd)
WAFU	A	(Liberia) Determine Girls (2nd)	(Mali) AS Mandé (2nd)	(Senegal) USPA (1st)	
WAFU	B	(Burkina Faso) US Forces Armées (2nd)	(Ivory Coast) Athlético F.C. d'Abidjan (1st)	(Ghana) Ampem Darkoa (1st)	(Niger) AS Police (2nd)
WAFU	B	(Nigeria) Bayelsa Queens(1st)	(Togo) Athleta (1st)	(Benin) Espoir (1st)	
UNIFFAC		(Cameroon) AS Awa (1st)	(Democratic Republic of the Congo) TP Mazembe (1st)	(Equatorial Guinea) Malabo Kings (2nd)	(Chad) CECUS FC (1st)
UNIFFAC		(Republic of the Congo) AC Colombe (1st)			
CECAFA		(Burundi) Fofila (1st)	(Djibouti) GRFC (1st)	(Ethiopia) CBE (2nd)	(Rwanda) AS Kigali (1st)
CECAFA		(South Sudan) Yei Join Star (2nd)	(Tanzania) Simba Queens (2nd)	(Uganda) She Corporate (1st)	(Zanzibar) Warrior Queens (1st)
COSAFA		(Botswana) Double Action Ladies (2nd)	(Eswatini) Young Buffaloes (1st)	(Comoros) Olympic de Moroni (1st)	(Mozambique) CD Costa do Sol (1st)
COSAFA		(South Africa) Mamelodi Sundowns (2nd)	(Zambia) Green Buffaloes (2nd)		

Associations which did not enter a team:

- Angola
- Central African Republic
- Cape Verde
- Eritrea
- Gabon
- Guinea
- Guinea-Bissau
- Kenya (withdrew)
- Libya
- Lesotho
- Madagascar
- Malawi
- Mauritania
- Mauritius
- Namibia
- São Tomé and Príncipe
- Seychelles
- Sierra Leone
- Somalia
- Sudan
- Zimbabwe

== Main Qualification Phase ==
=== UNAF ===
Qualification from this region took place in Agadir, Morocco from 14 to 20 August 2022.

Pos	Team	Pld	W	D	L	GF	GA	GD	Pts	Qualification	WDG	ASB	AFR
1	(Egypt) Wadi Degla	2	2	0	0	4	0	+4	6	Main tournament	—	2–0	
2	(Tunisia) AS Banque de l'Habitat	2	1	0	1	3	3	0	3			—	3–1
3	(Algeria) Afak Relizane	2	0	0	2	1	5	−4	0		0–2		—

Source: www.unafonline.org

=== WAFU Zone A ===
Qualification from this region took place in Paynesville, Liberia.

Pos	Team	Pld	W	D	L	GF	GA	GD	Pts	Qualification	DGF FC	ASM	USPA
1	(Liberia) Determine Girls FC	2	1	1	0	2	1	+1	4	Main tournament	—	1–1	
2	(Mali) AS Mandé	2	0	2	0	1	1	0	2			—	0–0
3	(Senegal) USPA	2	0	1	1	0	1	−1	1		0–1		—

=== WAFU Zone B ===
Seven clubs competed for this year's qualification tournament which was held in Yamoussoukro, Ivory Coast, from 20 August to 2 September 2022. having been originally scheduled for hosting in Abidjan.

==== Group A ====
Pos	Team	Pld	W	D	L	GF	GA	GD	Pts	Qualification	ASA	EFC	ASP
1	(Ivory Coast) Africa Sports	2	2	0	0	8	1	+7	6	Semi-finals	—		5–0
2	(Benin) Espoir FC	2	1	0	1	3	4	−1	3	Semi-finals	1–3	—	
3	(Niger) AS Police	2	0	0	2	1	7	−6	0			1–2	—

===== Group B =====
Pos	Team	Pld	W	D	L	GF	GA	GD	Pts	Qualification	AD	BFC	USFA	AFC
1	(Ghana) Ampem Darkoa	3	2	1	0	4	0	+4	7	Semi-finals	—	0–0	3–0	
2	(Nigeria) Bayelsa Queens	3	2	1	0	8	1	+7	7	Semi-finals		—	3–1	
3	(Burkina Faso) USFA	3	1	0	2	6	4	+2	3				—	5–1
4	(Togo) Athleta FC	3	0	0	3	1	11	−10	0		0–1	0–5		—

==== Knockout stage ====
===== Semi-finals =====
Team 1	Score	Team 2
Africa Sports (Ivory Coast)	1–1 (5–6 p)	(Ghana) Ampem Darkoa
Bayelsa Queens (Nigeria)	6–0	(Benin) Espoir FC

===== Third place =====
Team 1	Score	Team 2
Africa Sports (Ivory Coast)	4–0	(Benin) Espoir FC

===== Final =====
Team 1	Score	Team 2
Ampem Darkoa (Ghana)	0–3	(Nigeria) Bayelsa Queens

=== UNIFFAC ===
Qualification from this region was originally to be held from 20 August to 4 September 2022 in Yaoundé, Cameroon, with two-legged ties for the semi-finals. Due to the lack of guarantee from the Cameroonian government, Equatorial Guinea was announced as the new host on 24 August which ran from 10 to 26 September 2022, disqualifying Cameroonian club, AS Awa, in the process.

==== Round 1 ====
Team 1	Score	Team 2
CECUS FC (Chad)	w/o	(Republic of the Congo) AC Colombe
AS Awa (Cameroon)	0–1	(Democratic Republic of the Congo) TP Mazembe

==== Semi-finals ====
Team 1	Score	Team 2
CECUS FC (Chad)	0–4	(Democratic Republic of the Congo) TP Mazembe
Malabo Kings (Equatorial Guinea)	0–3	(Cameroon) AS Awa

==== Final ====
Team 1	Score	Team 2
TP Mazembe (Democratic Republic of the Congo)	2–1	(Cameroon) AS Awa

=== CECAFA ===
Qualification from this region was held from 14 to 27 August in Dar es salaam, Tanzania, having initially been scheduled from 28 July to 10 August 2022 in Arusha, Tanzania.

=== Group A ===
Pos	Team	Pld	W	D	L	GF	GA	GD	Pts	Qualification	CBE	ASK	FPF	WQFC
1	(Ethiopia) CBE FC	3	3	0	0	16	1	+15	9	Semi-finals	—		5–1	9–0
2	(Rwanda) AS Kigali WFC	3	2	0	1	5	3	+2	6	Semi-finals	0–2	—		3–0
3	(Burundi) Fofila PF	3	1	0	2	5	7	−2	3			1–2	—	3–0
4	(Zanzibar) Warriors QFC	3	0	0	3	0	15	−15	0					—

==== Group B ====
Pos	Team	Pld	W	D	L	GF	GA	GD	Pts	Qualification	SQ	SCP	YJS	GRFC
1	(Tanzania) Simba Queens	3	3	0	0	12	0	+12	9	Semi-finals	—	2–0	4–0	
2	(Uganda) She Corporate	3	2	0	1	18	2	+16	6	Semi-finals		—	6–0	
3	(South Sudan) Yei Joint Stars	3	1	0	2	6	10	−4	3				—	
4	(Djibouti) GRFC	3	0	0	3	0	20	−20	0		0–6	0–8	0–6	—

==== Knockout stage ====
===== Semi-finals =====
Team 1	Score	Team 2
CBE FC (Ethiopia)	1–2	(Uganda) She Corporate
Simba Queens (Tanzania)	5–1	(Rwanda) AS Kigali WFC

===== Third place =====
Team 1	Score	Team 2
CBE FC (Ethiopia)	3–1	(Rwanda) AS Kigali WFC

===== Final =====
Team 1	Score	Team 2
She Corporate (Uganda)	0–1	(Tanzania) Simba Queens

=== COSAFA ===
Qualification from this region (branded as the COSAFA Women's Champions League) was held in South Africa from 7 to 14 August 2022. Six qualified teams were divided into two groups of three with the top two in each group advancing to the semi-finals.

==== Group stage ====
===== Group A =====
Pos	Team	Pld	W	D	L	GF	GA	GD	Pts	Qualification
1	(South Africa) Mamelodi Sundowns	2	1	1	0	9	2	+7	4	Final
2	(Botswana) Double Action Ladies	2	1	1	0	3	1	+2	4	Third place
3	(Mozambique) CD Costa do Sol	2	0	0	2	1	10	−9	0	

===== Group B =====
Pos	Team	Pld	W	D	L	GF	GA	GD	Pts	Qualification
1	(Zambia) Green Buffaloes	2	2	0	0	8	0	+8	6	Final
2	(Comoros) Olympic de Moroni	2	1	0	1	1	4	−3	3	Third place
3	(Eswatini) Young Buffaloes	2	0	0	2	0	5	−5	0	

==== Knockout stage ====
===== Third place =====
Team 1	Score	Team 2
Double Action Ladies (Botswana)	3–0	(Comoros) Olympic de Moroni

===== Final =====
Team 1	Score	Team 2
Green Buffaloes (Zambia)	0–0 (6–5 p)	(South Africa) Mamelodi Sundowns Ladies
