= 2016 Sasol League National Championship =

Tournament details
- Country: South Africa
- City: Mossel Bay
- Venue: D’Almeida Stadium
- Dates: 6 December 2016 – 11 December 2016
- Teams: 9

Final positions
- Champions: Bloemfontein Celtics Ladies (1st title)
- Runners-up: JVW
- Third place: Kanatla Ladies
- Fourth place: Coal City Wizards

Tournament statistics
- Top goal scorer(s): Lesedi Matjila (8 goals)

Awards
- Best player: Mamello Makhabane
- Best young player: Boitumelo Rabale
- Best goalkeeper: Yolula Tsawe

The 2016 Sasol League National Championship was the 8th edition of the Sasol League National Championship since it was formed in 2009. It was held at D’Almeida Stadium in Mossel Bay.

Mamelodi Sundowns Ladies were the defending champions. They failed to qualify for the national championship in 2016 with JVW being the Gauteng Sasol League champions. Bloemfontein Celtics Ladies defeated JVW 1-0 in the final to lift their maiden title.

== Participating teams ==
All nine teams qualified through winning their provincial league.

Team	Provincial League
City Lads	Eastern Cape Sasol League
Bloemfontein Celtics Ladies	Free State Sasol League
JVW	Gauteng Sasol League
Durban Ladies	KwaZulu Natal Sasol League
Kanatla Ladies	Limpopo Sasol League
Coal City Wizards	Mpumalanga Sasol League
Richmond United	Northern Cape Sasol League
Golden Ladies	North West Sasol League
UWC	Western Cape Sasol League

== Knockout stages ==
=== 3rd/4th play off ===
11 December 2016

Kanatla Ladies	2–2	Coal City Wizards
Penalties
	4-2

D’Almeida Stadium

=== Final ===
11 December 2016

Bloemfontein Celtics Ladies	1–0	JVW
70' Emily Moholoholo

D’Almeida Stadium

== Final standings ==
Rank	Team	Prize money
1	Bloemfontein Celtics Ladies	R50 000
2	JVW	R35 000
3	Kanatla Ladies	R25 000
4	Coal City Wizards	R20 000
5	City Lads	R18 000
6	Durban Ladies	R16 000
7	UWC Ladies FC	R14 000
8	Golden Ladies	R12 000
9	Richmond United	R10 000

== Awards ==
The following players/official were rated best in the tournament:

Award	Winner	Club
Diski Queen of the Tournament	Mamello Makhabane	JVW
Queen of Queens of the Tournament	Mamello Makhabane	JVW
Best goalkeeper	Yolula Tsawe	JVW
Top goalscorer of the Tournament	Lesedi Matjila	Coal City Wizards
Young Queen of the Tournament	Boitumelo Rabale	Bloemfontein Celtics Ladies
Referee of the Tournament	Lindiwe Thwala	
