= Kanatla Ladies F.C. =

- Full name: Kanatla Ladies Football Club
- League: Sasol Women's League
- 2024: 6th (Limpopo Stream A)

Kanatla Ladies F.C. is a women's soccer club based in Modimolle, Limpopo, South Africa. The team competes in the Sasol Women's League, the second tier women's football league in South Africa.

== History ==
In 2014 they recorded their highest win with a 8–1 win over Development F.C. in the Limpopo Sasol Women's League Stream A match. They won the 2015 Limpopo Sasol Women's League and defended their title in 2016 with a 3–0 win over Chippas United Ladies.

In the 2015 Sasol League National Championship they won third place after winning 4-1 via penalties against Durban Ladies after the match ended in a 1–1 draw. They won third place again in the 2016 Sasol League National Championship winning 4-2 via penalties against Coal City Wizards after the match ended in a 2–2 draw.

== Honours ==
- Limpopo Sasol Women's League: 2015, 2016
- Sasol League National Championship: Third: 2015, 2016
