= Bloemfontein Celtic Ladies =

Bloemfontein Celtic Ladies F.C.
- Nicknames: Phunya Sele Sele, Siwelele sa Masele
- Dissolved: 2022; 4 years ago
Home colours	Away colours

Bloemfontein Celtic Ladies F.C., also known as Celtic Ladies, was a women's soccer club based in Bloemfontein, Free State.

Bloemfontein Celtic Ladies was the most successful women's team in the Free State before selling their franchise to Royal AM Women after their male counterpart, Bloemfontein Celtic, also sold its premiership status to Shawn Mkhize of Royal AM.

== History ==
They won the 2015 Free State Sasol Women's League and qualified for the 2015 Sasol League National Championship but they failed to make it to the knockout stages of the tournament.

They defended their Free State Sasol Women's League in 2016 and qualified for the 2016 Sasol League National Championship where they defeated JVW 1–0 in the final to lift their maiden title.

They defended both titles in 2017 and became the first team to defend their Sasol League National Championship at the 2017 edition.

They won the Free State Sasol Women's League for the fourth consecutive year in 2018. They failed to defend their 2016 and 2017 title in 2018 as they did not make it to the knockout stages of the 2018 Sasol League National Championship.

In 2019, they part of the inaugural SAFA Women's League. They finished third in the 2019-20 SAFA Women's League. In the 2021 SAFA Women's League they finished 6th. In the middle of the 2022 SAFA Women's League, 12 matches played, they were bought by Shawn Mkhize with the team and players moving to KwaZulu-Natal and renamed Royal AM Women.

== Notable players ==
=== FIFA World Cup participants ===
List of players that were called up for a FIFA Women's World Cup while playing for Bloemfontein Celtics Ladies. In brackets, the tournament played:

- (South Africa) Bambanani Mbane (2019)

Players who have received a Banyana Banyana call up while playing for the club:

- Melinda Kgadiete

== Honours ==
- Free State Sasol Women's League: 2015, 2016, 2017, 2018
- Sasol League National Championship: 2016, 2017
- SAFA Women's League: Third: 2019-20
