= Cape Town Roses F.C. =

Women's football club in South Africa

Cape Town Roses
- Full name: Cape Town Roses Football Club
- Founded: 1998; 28 years ago
- Founder: Xolane Madikane
- Coach: (South Africa) Xolane Madikane
- League: Sasol Women's League

Cape Town Roses F.C. is a women's soccer club based in Gugulethu, Western Cape. The team competes in the Sasol Women's League, the second tier women's football league in South Africa.

The team is best known for fielding young players. They won their maiden national title at the 2014 Sasol League National Championship in Gqeberha.

== History ==
The team was founded in 1998 by primary school teacher Xolane Madikane, who also serves as coach, as an after school girls program. Madikane initially was coaching the boys team at Lwazi Primary School and allowed a few girls to join in. As the number of girls grew, he started a girls team that would also be open to girls from outside the school to join.

During the 2022 season, the team won the Cape Town leg of the Engen Knockout Challenge, the Golden United Tournament, and the Stan Mathews Cup.

In 2023, they successfully defended the Cape Town Engen Knockout Challenge after defeating RV United W.F.C 2–0 to qualify for the ENGEN Champ of Champs tournament. They were crowned Norman Ncaca Cup champions after defeating Dangerous Heroes 4–2 in Langa on the 21st of March 2023.

They started the 2024 season by finishing runners-up in the Dream Cup. They defended the Engen Knockout Challenge to win their third successive title with a 5–0 win over Dangerous Heroes in June. In 2025 they won their fourth ENGEN Knockout Challenge.

== Honours ==
- Sasol League National Championship: 2014
- Cape Town Engen Knockout Challenge: 2022, 2023, 2024, 2025
- Golden United Tournament:2022
- Bayview Cup:2022
- Stan Mathews Cup:2022
- Norman Ncaca Cup: 2023
- Dream Cup: runner-up:2024

== Notable players ==
=== FIFA U-17 Women's World Cup ===
List of players that were called up for a FIFA U-17 Women's World Cup while playing for the club. In brackets, the tournament played:

- Meagan Newman (2010)
- Presocious Matabologa (2010)
- Nthabiseng Masunte (2010)
- Leigh Brophy (2018)
- Ember Edwards (2018)

Players who have played for Cape Town Roses include:

- Lelona Daweti
- Sinoxolo Cesane
- Noxolo Cesane
- Leandra Smeda
- Roxanne Barker
- Ode Fulutudilu
